= Nepalese cricket team in Malaysia in 2019 =

International cricket tour

	Malaysia	Nepal
- Dates: 13 – 14 July 2019
Captains	Ahmad Faiz	Paras Khadka

Twenty20 International series
- Results: Nepal won the 2-match series 2–0
Most runs	Virandeep Singh (80)	Paras Khadka (109)
Most wickets	Fitri Sham (4)	Karan KC (4); Sandeep Lamichhane (4)

The Nepal cricket team toured Malaysia in July 2019 to play a two-match Twenty20 International (T20I) series. The fixtures were part of both teams' preparation for the Asian Regional Qualifying Finals tournament for the 2019 ICC T20 World Cup Qualifier. Both matches were played at the Kinrara Oval in Kuala Lumpur. Ahead of the tour, Nepal's captain Paras Khadka named a twenty five-man preliminary squad for the Asian Regional Qualifying Finals, which was trimmed down to the final fourteen players. Nepal won the series 2–0, their first ever series whitewash. Malaysia retained the same squad for Asian Regional Qualifying Finals.

== Squads ==
Malaysia	Nepal
Ahmad Faiz (c); Anwar Arudin; Syed Aziz; Neville Liyanage; Sharvin Muniandy; Anwar Rahman; Nazril Rahman; Aminuddin Ramly; Fitri Sham; Shafiq Sharif (wk); Pavandeep Singh; Virandeep Singh; Pasha Syafiq Ali (wk); Muhamad Syahadat	Paras Khadka (c); Gyanendra Malla (vc); Dipendra Singh Airee; Pradeep Airee (wk); Binod Bhandari (wk); Abinash Bohara; Karan KC; Sompal Kami; Sandeep Lamichhane; Rohit Paudel; Lalit Rajbanshi; Basanta Regmi; Pawan Sarraf; Sharad Vesawkar

== T20I series ==
=== 1st T20I ===
13 July 2019
10:00
Scorecard

Malaysia; 128/9 (20 overs)	v	Nepal; 129/3 (18.3 overs)
Virandeep Singh 57 (49); Karan KC 3/27 (4 overs)		Paras Khadka 86* (50); Anwar Rahman 2/20 (4 overs)

Nepal won by 7 wickets
Kinrara Oval, Kuala Lumpur
Umpires: Viswanadan Kalidas (Mas) and Denish Sevakumaran (Mas)
Player of the match: Paras Khadka (Nep)

- Malaysia won the toss and elected to bat.
- Pavandeep Singh (Mas) made his T20I debut.

=== 2nd T20I ===
14 July 2019
10:00
Scorecard

Nepal; 173/6 (20 overs)	v	Malaysia; 167/7 (20 overs)
Binod Bhandari 51* (25); Fitri Sham 3/26 (3 overs)		Syed Aziz 50 (37); Sompal Kami 2/25 (4 overs)

Nepal won by 6 runs
Kinrara Oval, Kuala Lumpur
Umpires: Viswanadan Kalidas (Mas) and Narayanan Sivan (Mas)
Player of the match: Binod Bhandari (Nep)

- Nepal won the toss and elected to bat.
