= 2024 Men's T20 World Cup Asia Sub-regional Qualifier A =

Qualification tournament for the 2026 T20WC in Asia region

2024 ICC Men's T20 World Cup Asia Sub-regional Qualifier A
- Tournament logo
- Dates: 30 August – 9 September 2024
- Administrator: ICC Asia
- Cricket format: Twenty20 International
- Tournament format: Round-robin
- Host: Malaysia
- Champions: Malaysia
- Runners-up: Kuwait
- Participants: 7
- Matches: 21
- Most runs: (Malaysia) Syed Aziz (216)
- Most wickets: (Kuwait) Yasin Patel (15)

The 2024 ICC Men's T20 World Cup Asia Sub-regional Qualifier A was a cricket tournament that formed part of the qualification process for the 2026 Men's T20 World Cup. It was hosted by Malaysia in August and September 2024.

The top two sides in the tournament, Malaysia and Kuwait advanced to the regional final, where they will be joined by Nepal, Oman and Papua New Guinea, who were given a bye after having participated in the previous T20 World Cup, and two other teams from sub-regional qualifier B, along with the winners of EAP qualifiers.

== Squads ==
Hong Kong	Kuwait	Malaysia	Maldives	Mongolia	Myanmar	Singapore
Nizakat Khan (c); Zeeshan Ali; Martin Coetzee; Babar Hayat; Rajab Hussain; Ateeq Iqbal; Anas Khan; Ehsan Khan; Aizaz Khan; Yasim Murtaza; Nasrulla Rana; Anshuman Rath; Ayush Shukla; Darsh Vora	Mohammed Aslam (c); Ilyas Ahmed; Mirza Ahmed; Nawaf Ahmed; Clinto Anto; Muhammad Aqif; Meet Bhavsar (wk); Adnan Idrees; Shiraz Khan; Nimish Lathief; Sayed Monib; Usman Patel (wk); Yasin Patel; Ravija Sandaruwan; Mohamed Shafeeq; Bilal Tahir; Muhammad Umar	Syed Aziz (c, wk); Muhammad Amir; Ahmed Aqeel; Azri Azhar; Ahmad Faiz; Ainool Hafizs; Rizwan Haider; Aslam Khan; Sharvin Muniandy; Rajkumar Rajendran; Pavandeep Singh; Virandeep Singh; Vijay Unni; Zubaidi Zulkifle	Azyan Farhath (c); Umar Adam (vc); Mabsar Abdulla; Ismail Ali; Mohamed Azzam; Ibrahim Hassan; Piyal Kumar; Mohamed Miuvaan; Azin Rafeeq; Mohamed Rishwan; Ibrahim Rizan; Leem Shafeeq; Mohamed Shiyam; Ali Shunan; Gedara Wijesingha	Luvsanzundui Erdenebulgan (c); Temuulen Amarmend; Turbold Batjargal; Enkhbat Batkhuyag; Gandemberel Ganbold; Sodbileg Gantulga; Davaasuren Jamyansuren; Od Lutbayar (wk); Bat-Yalalt Namsrai; Nyambaatar Naranbaatar; Sanchir Natsagdorj; Zoljavkhlan Shurentsetseg; Turmunkh Tumursukh; Mohan Vivekanandan	Htet Lin Aung (c); Myat Thu Aung; Thuya Aung; Khin Aye (wk); Paing Danu; Aung Ko Ko; Swann Htet Ko Ko (wk); Htet Lin Oo; Nay Lin Htun; Ko Ko Lin Thu; Lwin Maw; Nyeing Cham Soe; Ye Naing Tun; Pyae Phyo Wai	Manpreet Singh (c, wk); Janak Prakash (vc); Vinoth Baskaran; Harsha Bhardwaj; Surendran Chandramohan; Aman Desai; Aritra Dutta; Ramesh Kalimuthu; Amartya Kaul; Arjun Mutreja; Anish Paraam; Akshay Puri; Raoul Sharma; Rahul Sheshadri; William Simpson

== Points table ==
Qualifier A standings
Pos	Team	Pld	W	L	NR	Pts	NRR	Qualification
1	Malaysia (H)	6	5	1	0	10	2.612	Advanced to the regional final
2	Kuwait	6	4	1	1	9	5.053	Advanced to the regional final
3	Hong Kong	6	4	1	1	9	4.945	Eliminated
4	Singapore	6	4	2	0	8	3.141	Eliminated
5	Maldives	6	2	4	0	4	−1.368	Eliminated
6	Myanmar	6	1	5	0	2	−3.712	Eliminated
7	Mongolia	6	0	6	0	0	−7.145	Eliminated

Source: ESPNcricinfo
(H) Host

== Fixtures ==
30 August 2024
09:30
Scorecard

Malaysia; 203/3 (20 overs)	v	Maldives; 109/6 (20 overs)
Zubaidi Zulkifle 72 (46); Azyan Farhath 1/12 (2 overs)		Umar Adam 46 (32); Sharvin Muniandy 2/7 (2 overs)

Malaysia won by 94 runs
Bayuemas Oval, Pandamaran
Umpires: Tabarak Dar (HK) and Morshed Ali Khan (Ban)
Player of the match: Syed Aziz (Mas)

- Maldives won the toss and elected to field.
- Mohamed Shiyam and Gedara Wijesingha (Mdv) both made their T20I debuts.

30 August 2024
09:30
Scorecard

Myanmar; 50/7 (20 overs)	v	Hong Kong; 51/1 (4.3 overs)
Ko Ko Lin Thu 15 (21); Anas Khan 2/9 (4 overs)		Zeeshan Ali 18 (8)

Hong Kong won by 9 wickets
UKM-YSD Cricket Oval, Bangi
Umpires: Faisal Afridi (Pak) and Buddhi Pradhan (Nep)
Player of the match: Anas Khan (HK)

- Hong Kong won the toss and elected to field.

30 August 2024
13:45
Scorecard

Kuwait; 210/8 (20 overs)	v	Mongolia; 50 (18.3 overs)
Clinto Anto 75 (42); Luvsanzundai Erdenebulgan 2/30 (4 overs)		Temuulen Amarmend 21* (30); Shiraz Khan 3/8 (4 overs)

Kuwait won by 160 runs
Bayuemas Oval, Pandamaran
Umpires: Morshed Ali Khan (Ban) and Shiju Sam (UAE)
Player of the match: Clinto Anto (Kuw)

- Mongolia won the toss and elected to field.
- Sodbileg Gantulga and Sanchir Natsagdorj (Mgl) both made their T20I debuts.

31 August 2024
09:30
Scorecard

Singapore; 153/7 (20 overs)	v	Maldives; 106/8 (20 overs)
Manpreet Singh 51 (42); Leem Shafeeq 2/27 (4 overs)		Mohamed Shiyam 25* (26); Amartya Kaul 3/20 (4 overs); Janak Prakash 3/20 (4 overs)

Singapore won by 47 runs
Bayuemas Oval, Pandamaran
Umpires: Viswanadan Kalidas (Mas) and Buddhi Pradhan (Nep)
Player of the match: Manpreet Singh (Sin)

- Singapore won the toss and elected to bat.
- Rahul Sheshadri and William Simpson (Sin) both made their T20I debuts.
- Surendran Chandramohan crossed 1,000 runs in T20Is.

31 August 2024
09:30
Scorecard

Myanmar; 75/7 (20 overs)	v	Malaysia; 78/4 (9.4 overs)
Pyae Phyo Wai 26 (33); Vijay Unni 1/9 (3 overs)		Virandeep Singh 23* (14); Pyae Phyo Wai 3/20 (4 overs)

Malaysia won by 6 wickets
UKM-YSD Cricket Oval, Bangi
Umpires: Shiju Sam (UAE) and Tabarak Dar (HK)
Player of the match: Virandeep Singh (Mas)

- Malaysia won the toss and elected to field.
- Azri Azhar (Mas) and Lwin Maw (Mya) both made their T20I debuts.

31 August 2024
13:45
Scorecard

Mongolia; 17 (14.2 overs)	v	Hong Kong; 18/1 (1.4 overs)
Mohan Vivekanandan 5 (18); Ehsan Khan 4/5 (3 overs)		Zeeshan Ali 15* (6); Od Lutbayar 1/5 (0.4 overs)

Hong Kong won by 9 wickets
Bayuemas Oval, Pandamaran
Umpires: Faisal Afridi (Pak) and Viswanadan Kalidas (Mas)
Player of the match: Ehsan Khan (HK)

- Hong Kong won the toss and elected to field.
- Enkhbat Batkhuyag and Turbold Batjargal (Mgl) both made their T20I debuts.
- Ayush Shukla (HK) became the third bowler to bowl four consecutive maiden overs in a T20I match.

2 September 2024
09:30
Scorecard

Hong Kong; 201/8 (20 overs)	v	Singapore; 73/4 (8 overs)
Zeeshan Ali 70 (35); Akshay Puri 2/38 (3 overs)		Manpreet Singh 22 (9); Ehsan Khan 3/18 (2 overs)

Hong Kong won by 23 runs (DLS method)
Bayuemas Oval, Pandamaran
Umpires: Buddhi Pradhan (Nep) and Morshed Ali Khan (Ban)
Player of the match: Zeeshan Ali (HK)

- Singapore won the toss and elected to field.
- Singapore were set a revised target of 97 runs from 8 overs due to rain.

2 September 2024
09:30
Scorecard

Kuwait; 226/4 (20 overs)	v	Maldives; 84/7 (20 overs)
Usman Patel 111* (52); Ibrahim Hassan 2/28 (3 overs)		Umar Adam 27 (13); Yasin Patel 3/18 (4 overs)

Kuwait won by 142 runs
UKM-YSD Cricket Oval, Bangi
Umpires: Faisal Afridi (Pak) and Tabarak Dar (HK)
Player of the match: Usman Patel (Kuw)

- Maldives won the toss and elected to field.
- Usman Patel (Kuw) scored his first century in T20Is.

2 September 2024
13:45
Scorecard

Myanmar; 132/6 (20 overs)	v	Mongolia; 61/9 (20 overs)
Pyae Phyo Wai 39 (41); Mohan Vivekanandan 2/21 (4 overs)		Sanchir Natsagdorj 11 (35); Khin Aye 2/5 (2 overs)

Myanmar won by 71 runs
UKM-YSD Cricket Oval, Bangi
Umpires: Tabarak Dar (HK) and Viswanadan Kalidas (Mas)
Player of the match: Pyae Phyo Wai (Mya)

- Mongolia won the toss and elected to field.

3 September 2024
09:30
Scorecard

Maldives; 102/9 (20 overs)	v	Hong Kong; 107/1 (9 overs)
Umar Adam 26 (15); Ehsan Khan 3/20 (4 overs)		Zeeshan Ali 50* (21); Mohamed Shiyam 1/22 (1 over)

Hong Kong won by 9 wickets
UKM-YSD Cricket Oval, Bangi
Umpires: Faisal Afridi (Pak) and Shiju Sam (UAE)
Player of the match: Ateeq Iqbal (HK)

- Hong Kong won the toss and elected to field.
- Mabsar Abdulla (Mdv) made his T20I debut.
- Nizakat Khan (HK) scored his 2,000th runs in T20Is.

3 September 2024
13:45
Scorecard

Myanmar; 47/7 (20 overs)	v	Kuwait; 48/2 (3.3 overs)
Pyae Phyo Wai 16 (38); Yasin Patel 3/6 (4 overs)		Ravija Sandaruwan 20 (7); Paing Danu 1/23 (1.3 overs)

Kuwait won by 8 wickets
Bayuemas Oval, Pandamaran
Umpires: Tabarak Dar (HK) and Viswanadan Kalidas (Mas)
Player of the match: Yasin Patel (Kuw)

- Kuwait won the toss and elected to field.

3 September 2024
13:45
Scorecard

Malaysia; 182/6 (20 overs)	v	Singapore; 181/7 (20 overs)
Syed Aziz 53 (22); Ramesh Kalimuthu 2/53 (4 overs)		Anish Paraam 78* (46); Pavandeep Singh 3/25 (4 overs)

Malaysia won by 1 run
UKM-YSD Cricket Oval, Bangi
Umpires: Faisal Afridi (Pak) and Morshed Ali Khan (Ban)
Player of the match: Syed Aziz (Mas)

- Malaysia won the toss and elected to bat.

5 September 2024
09:30
Scorecard

Malaysia; 149/7 (20 overs)	v	Kuwait; 150/2 (15.2 overs)
Virandeep Singh 43 (37); Yasin Patel 3/22 (4 overs)		Usman Patel 57* (38); Vijay Unni 1/25 (4 overs)

Kuwait won by 8 wickets
Bayuemas Oval, Pandamaran
Umpires: Morshed Ali Khan (Ban) and Buddhi Pradhan (Nep)
Player of the match: Usman Patel (Kuw)

- Kuwait won the toss and elected to field.

5 September 2024
09:30
Scorecard

Mongolia; 10 (10 overs)	v	Singapore; 13/1 (0.5 overs)
Gandemberel Ganbold 2 (4); Harsha Bharadwaj 6/3 (4 overs)		Raoul Sharma 7* (2); Enkhbat Batkhuyag 1/13 (0.5 overs)

Singapore won by 9 wickets
UKM-YSD Cricket Oval, Bangi
Umpires: Faisal Afridi (Pak) and Viswanadan Kalidas (Mas)
Player of the match: Harsha Bharadwaj (Sin)

- Singapore won the toss and elected to field.
- Harsha Bharadwaj (Sin) took his first five-wicket haul in T20Is.
- Mongolia scored the joint-lowest innings total in T20Is.

5 September 2024
13:45
Scorecard

Myanmar; 51 (17 overs)	v	Maldives; 52/1 (5.3 overs)
Htet Lin Oo 14 (18); Umar Adam 3/11 (4 overs)		Ismail Ali 23* (11); Pyae Phyo Wai 1/14 (2 overs)

Maldives won by 9 wickets
Bayuemas Oval, Pandamaran
Umpires: Tabarak Dar (HK) and Buddhi Pradhan (Nep)
Player of the match: Umar Adam (Mdv)

- Myanmar won the toss and elected to bat.

6 September 2024
09:30
Scorecard

Maldives; 178/6 (20 overs)	v	Mongolia; 61 (19.1 overs)
Gedara Wijesingha 56 (39); Luvsanzundui Erdenebulgan 3/29 (4 overs)		Od Lutbayar 18 (17); Azyan Farhath 4/5 (4 overs)

Maldives won by 117 runs
Bayuemas Oval, Pandamaran
Umpires: Buddhi Pradhan (Nep) and Shiju Sam (UAE)
Player of the match: Azyan Farhath (Mdv)

- Maldives won the toss and elected to bat.
- Maldives scored their highest innings total in T20Is.

6 September 2024
09:30
Scorecard

Kuwait; 152/9 (20 overs)	v	Singapore; 156/5 (18.5 overs)
Ravija Sandaruwan 56 (36); Ramesh Kalimuthu 5/21 (4 overs)		William Simpson 46* (39); Yasin Patel 2/27 (3.5 overs)

Singapore won by 5 wickets
UKM-YSD Cricket Oval, Bangi
Umpires: Tabarak Dar (HK) and Morshed Ali Khan (Ban)
Player of the match: Ramesh Kalimuthu (Sin)

- Singapore won the toss and elected to field.
- Ramesh Kalimuthu (Sin) took his first five wicket haul in T20Is.

7 September 2024
13:45
Scorecard

Malaysia; 124 (18.4 overs)	v	Hong Kong; 121/9 (20 overs)
Syed Aziz 40 (30); Yasim Murtaza 3/12 (4 overs)		Nizakat Khan 34 (35); Syed Aziz 4/9 (3 overs)

Malaysia won by 3 runs
Bayuemas Oval, Pandamaran
Umpires: Faisal Afridi (Pak) and Shiju Sam (UAE)
Player of the match: Syed Aziz (Mas)

- Hong Kong won the toss and elected to field.

9 September 2024
09:30
Scorecard

Myanmar; 45 (17.5 overs)	v	Singapore; 47/2 (4.4 overs)
Htet Lin Aung 11 (15); Harsha Bharadwaj 4/8 (4 overs)		William Simpson 24* (8); Htet Lin Aung 1/17 (2 overs)

Singapore won by 8 wickets
Bayuemas Oval, Pandamaran
Umpires: Tabarak Dar (HK) and Viswanadan Kalidas (Mas)
Player of the match: Harsha Bharadwaj (Sin)

- Singapore won the toss and elected to field.

9 September 2024
09:30
Scorecard

Mongolia; 31 (16.1 overs)	v	Malaysia; 35/0 (2.1 overs)
Mohan Vivekanandan 8 (26); Virandeep Singh 4/5 (4 overs)		Syed Aziz 31* (11)

Malaysia won by 10 wickets
UKM-YSD Cricket Oval, Bangi
Umpires: Buddhi Pradhan (Nep) and Shiju Sam (UAE)
Player of the match: Virandeep Singh (Mas)

- Malaysia won the toss and elected to field.

9 September 2024
13:45
Scorecard

Hong Kong; 139/9 (20 overs)	v	Kuwait; 11/2 (4 overs)
Babar Hayat 42 (48); Mohamed Shafeeq 3/35 (4 overs)		Clinto Anto 4* (12); Ehsan Khan 1/2 (1 over)

No result
UKM-YSD Cricket Oval, Bangi
Umpires: Morshed Ali Khan (Ban) and Shiju Sam (UAE)

- Kuwait won the toss and elected to field.
- No further play was possible due to rain.
