= Papua New Guinean cricket team in Malaysia in 2023–24 =

International cricket tour

Papua New Guinea men's cricket team in Malaysia in 2023–24
	Malaysia	Papua New Guinea
- Dates: 16 – 17 March 2024
Captains	Virandeep Singh	Assad Vala (Note: Tony Ura and Norman Vanua captained Papua New Guinea in the first and second T20Is, respectively.)

Twenty20 International series
- Results: 2-match series drawn 1–1
Most runs	Virandeep Singh (97)	Charles Amini (124)
Most wickets	Virandeep Singh (5)	Charles Amini (4)

The Papua New Guinea men's cricket team toured Malaysia in March 2024 to play two Twenty20 International (T20I) matches. The matches were held at the Bayuemas Oval near Pandamaran. The series formed part of Papua New Guinea's preparation for the 2024 ICC Men's T20 World Cup.

== Squads ==
Malaysia	Papua New Guinea
Virandeep Singh (c); Muhammad Amir; Ahmed Aqeel; Wan Azam (wk); Syed Aziz; Ahmad Faiz; Rizwan Haider; Khizar Hayat; Ainool Hafizs (wk); Syazrul Idrus; Sharvin Muniandy; Anwar Rahman; Fitri Sham; Pavandeep Singh; Muhamad Syahadat; Vijay Unni; Muhammad Wafiq; Zubaidi Zulkifle	Assad Vala (c); Charles Amini; Sese Bau; Kiplin Doriga (wk); Jack Gardner; Hiri Hiri; Semo Kamea; John Kariko; Kabua Morea; Alei Nao; Nosaina Pokana; Lega Siaka; Chad Soper; Tony Ura; Norman Vanua; Hila Vare (wk)

== T20I series ==
=== 1st T20I ===
16 March 2024
10:45
Scorecard

Papua New Guinea; 206/3 (20 overs)	v	Malaysia; 129/9 (20 overs)
Charles Amini 91* (53); Virandeep Singh 1/19 (2 overs)		Ahmad Faiz 36 (29); Charles Amini 3/18 (4 overs)

Papua New Guinea won by 77 runs
Bayuemas Oval, Pandamaran
Umpires: Nasir Ali (Mas) and Loganathan Poobalan (Mas)
Player of the match: Charles Amini (PNG)

- Malaysia won the toss and elected to field.
- Ahmed Aqeel (Mas) made his T20I debut.

=== 2nd T20I ===
17 March 2024
10:45
Scorecard

Malaysia; 161/4 (20 overs)	v	Papua New Guinea; 98 (17 overs)
Virandeep Singh 65* (46); John Kariko 2/22 (4 overs)		Charles Amini 33 (23); Virandeep Singh 4/8 (3 overs)

Malaysia won by 63 runs
Bayuemas Oval, Pandamaran
Umpires: Nasir Ali (Mas) and Denish Sevakumaran (Mas)
Player of the match: Virandeep Singh (Mas)

- Malaysia won the toss and elected to bat.
