= 2023 Men's T20 World Cup Asia regional final =

Cricket qualification tournament

2023 ICC Men's T20 World Cup Asia regional final
- Dates: 30 October – 5 November 2023
- Administrator(s): International Cricket Council; Asian Cricket Council
- Cricket format: Twenty20 International
- Tournament format(s): Group round-robin and knockouts
- Host: Nepal
- Champions: Oman
- Runners-up: Nepal
- Participants: 8
- Matches: 15
- Player of the series: (Oman) Aqib Ilyas
- Most runs: (Nepal) Kushal Bhurtel (185)
- Most wickets: (Oman) Bilal Khan (11)

The 2024 ICC Men's T20 World Cup was the ninth edition of the ICC Men's T20 World Cup, a biennial world cup for cricket in Twenty20 International (T20I) format, organized by the International Cricket Council (ICC). The qualification process for the world cup included two stages: direct qualification and regional qualification. The regional qualification for Asia was held in two stages: sub-regional qualifiers and the regional final.

The Asia regional final was hosted by Cricket Association of Nepal from 30 October to 5 November 2023. Oman and Nepal qualified for the T20 World Cup after winning the semi-finals and advancing to the final. Oman's Aqib Ilyas was named player of the series while Nepal's Kushal Bhurtel scored the most runs (185) and Oman's Bilal Khan took the most wickets (11) in the tournament.

== Teams and qualification ==
A total of 9 teams participated in the sub-regional phase, which was divided into two events with four/five teams competing in each event. The top sides of each sub-regional qualifier advanced to the regional final, where they joined United Arab Emirates who received a bye due to their participation in the 2022 T20 World Cup and Bahrain, Hong Kong, Nepal, Oman and Singapore who received a bye after taking part in the 2022 global qualifiers.

Method of qualification	Date	Venue(s)	No. of teams	Team
2022 Men's T20 World Cup	13 November 2022	Australia	1	United Arab Emirates
2022 global qualifier A	24 February 2022	Oman	3	Bahrain
2022 global qualifier A	24 February 2022	Oman	3	Nepal
2022 global qualifier A	24 February 2022	Oman	3	Oman
2022 global qualifier B	17 July 2022	Zimbabwe	2	Hong Kong
2022 global qualifier B	17 July 2022	Zimbabwe	2	Singapore
Sub-regional qualifier A	28 September – 5 October 2023	Qatar	1	Kuwait
Sub-regional qualifier B	26 July – 1 August 2023	Malaysia	1	Malaysia
Total			8	

== Squads ==
Bahrain	Hong Kong	Kuwait	Malaysia
Umer Toor (c); Sohail Ahmed; Haider Ali; Imran Ali (wk); Sarfaraz Ali; Imran Anwar; Junaid Aziz; Ahmer Bin Nisar (wk); Rizwan Butt; Ali Dawood; Sachin Kumar; Abdul Majid; Yasser Nazir; Sai Sarthak; Sathaiya Veerapathiran	Nizakat Khan (c); Zeeshan Ali; Haroon Arshad; Martin Coetzee; Mohammad Ghazanfar; Adit Gorawara; Babar Hayat; Raag Kapur; Aizaz Khan; Ehsan Khan; Scott McKechnie (wk); Yasim Murtaza; Nasrulla Rana; Anshuman Rath; Ayush Shukla	Mohammed Aslam (c); Ilyas Ahmed; Mirza Ahmed; Clinto Anto; Meet Bhavsar (wk); Shiraz Khan (vc); Parvindar Kumar; Nimish Lathief; Sayed Monib; Usman Patel (wk); Yasin Patel; Ravija Sandaruwan; Mohamed Shafeeq; Diju Sheeli; Bilal Tahir	Ahmad Faiz (c); Muhammad Amir; Syed Aziz (wk); Ainool Hafizs (wk); Rizwan Haider; Khizar Hayat; Syazrul Idrus; Haiqal Khair; Sharvin Muniandy; Aiman Zaquan Ridzuan; Fitri Sham; Pavandeep Singh; Virandeep Singh; Vijay Unni; Zubaidi Zulkifle
Nepal	Oman	Singapore	United Arab Emirates
Rohit Paudel (c); Dipendra Singh Airee; Binod Bhandari (wk); Kushal Bhurtel; Abinash Bohara; Pratis GC; Gulsan Jha; Sundeep Jora; Karan KC; Sompal Kami; Sandeep Lamichhane; Kushal Malla; Lalit Rajbanshi; Aasif Sheikh (wk); Bibek Yadav	Zeeshan Maqsood (c); Shakeel Ahmad; Pratik Athavale; Fayyaz Butt; Sandeep Goud; Aqib Ilyas (vc); Kaleemullah; Ayaan Khan; Bilal Khan; Mehran Khan; Shoaib Khan; Naseem Khushi (wk); Muhammad Nadeem; Kashyap Prajapati; Bukkapatnam Siddharth	Aritra Dutta (c); Surendran Chandramohan; Aryaveer Chaudhary; Avi Dixit; Ramesh Kalimuthu; Amartya Kaul; Anantha Krishna; Anish Paraam; Janak Prakash; Akshay Puri; Utsav Rakshit; Rohan Rangarajan; Rahul Sheshadri; Manpreet Singh (wk); Thilip Thilappan	Muhammad Waseem (c); Vriitya Aravind (wk); Basil Hameed; Muhammad Jawadullah; Nilansh Keswani; Aayan Afzal Khan; Asif Khan; Zahoor Khan; Karthik Meiyappan; Ali Naseer; Khalid Shah; Alishan Sharafu; Aryansh Sharma (wk); Sanchit Sharma; Junaid Siddique

== Group stage ==
=== Group A ===
Pos	Team	Pld	W	L	NR	Pts	NRR	Qualification
1	Oman	3	3	0	0	6	0.983	Advanced to the semi-finals
2	Nepal	3	2	1	0	4	0.729	Advanced to the semi-finals
3	Malaysia	3	1	2	0	2	0.187	
4	Singapore	3	0	3	0	0	−1.936	

Source: ESPNcricinfo

30 October 2023
09:00
Scorecard

Singapore; 145/9 (20 overs)	v	Nepal; 147/2 (16.3 overs)
Rohan Rangarajan 46 (30); Abinash Bohara 3/43 (4 overs)		Kushal Bhurtel 74 (48); Akshay Puri 1/28 (3 overs)

Nepal won by 8 wickets
Tribhuvan University International Cricket Ground, Kirtipur
Umpires: Rashid Riaz (Pak) and Gazi Sohel (Ban)
Player of the match: Kushal Bhurtel (Nep)

- Singapore won the toss and elected to bat.
- Aryaveer Chaudhary, Ramesh Kalimuthu and Thilip Thilappan (Sin) all made their T20I debuts.

30 October 2023
13:15
Scorecard

Oman; 153/6 (20 overs)	v	Malaysia; 121/8 (20 overs)
Zeeshan Maqsood 56* (46); Virandeep Singh 3/24 (4 overs)		Virandeep Singh 57* (53); Zeeshan Maqsood 2/13 (4 overs)

Oman won by 32 runs
Tribhuvan University International Cricket Ground, Kirtipur
Umpires: Lyndon Hannibal (SL) and Rashid Riaz (Pak)
Player of the match: Zeeshan Maqsood (Oma)

- Oman won the toss and elected to bat.
- Pratik Athavale (Oma) made his T20I debut.
- Virandeep Singh (Mas) became the first player from an associate nation to score 2,000 runs in T20Is.

31 October 2023
09:00
Scorecard

Oman; 174/6 (20 overs)	v	Singapore; 152/8 (20 overs)
Aqib Ilyas 63 (35); Janak Prakash 2/22 (4 overs)		Surendran Chandramohan 41 (31); Fayyaz Butt 2/21 (4 overs)

Oman won by 22 runs
Tribhuvan University International Cricket Ground, Kirtipur
Umpires: Lyndon Hannibal (SL) and Gazi Sohel (Ban)
Player of the match: Aqib Ilyas (Oma)

- Singapore won the toss and elected to field.

31 October 2023
13:15
Scorecard

Malaysia; 165/9 (20 overs)	v	Nepal; 166/4 (18 overs)
Syed Aziz 68 (49); Abinash Bohara 4/27 (4 overs)		Kushal Malla 65 (34); Muhammad Amir 3/18 (3 overs)

Nepal won by 6 wickets
Tribhuvan University International Cricket Ground, Kirtipur
Umpires: Rashid Riaz (Pak) and Gazi Sohel (Ban)
Player of the match: Kushal Malla (Nep)

- Malaysia won the toss and elected to bat.

2 November 2023
09:00
Scorecard

Oman; 145/9 (20 overs)	v	Nepal; 140 (20 overs)
Zeeshan Maqsood 32 (26); Karan KC 3/43 (4 overs)		Bibek Yadav 39 (24); Bilal Khan 3/30 (4 overs)

Oman won by 5 runs
Tribhuvan University International Cricket Ground, Kirtipur
Umpires: Lyndon Hannibal (SL) and Rashid Riaz (Pak)
Player of the match: Shakeel Ahmad (Oma)

- Nepal won the toss and elected to field.
- Sompal Kami (Nep) took his 50th wicket in T20Is.

2 November 2023
13:15
Scorecard

Malaysia; 198/4 (20 overs)	v	Singapore; 138 (17.5 overs)
Ahmad Faiz 71 (41); Ramesh Kalimuthu 2/48 (4 overs)		Aritra Dutta 53 (31); Muhammad Amir 5/16 (3 overs)

Malaysia won by 60 runs
Tribhuvan University International Cricket Ground, Kirtipur
Umpires: Lyndon Hannibal (SL) and Gazi Sohel (Ban)
Player of the match: Muhammad Amir (Mas)

- Malaysia won the toss and elected to bat.
- Harsha Bharadwaj and Aaryan Menon (Sin) both made their T20I debuts.
- Muhammad Amir (Mas) took his first five-wicket haul in T20Is.

=== Group B ===
Pos	Team	Pld	W	L	NR	Pts	NRR	Qualification
1	United Arab Emirates	3	3	0	0	6	1.445	Advanced to the semi-finals
2	Bahrain	3	1	2	0	2	−0.398	Advanced to the semi-finals
3	Hong Kong	3	1	2	0	2	−0.433	
4	Kuwait	3	1	2	0	2	−0.649	

Source: ESPNcricinfo

30 October 2023
09:00
Scorecard

Bahrain; 135/6 (20 overs)	v	United Arab Emirates; 137/5 (18.2 overs)
Haider Butt 59* (43); Aayan Afzal Khan 2/13 (4 overs)		Ali Naseer 48* (26); Rizwan Butt 2/18 (4 overs)

United Arab Emirates won by 5 wickets
Mulpani International Cricket Ground, Kageshwari-Manohara
Umpires: Buddhi Pradhan (Nep) and Sarika Prasad (Sin)
Player of the match: Ali Naseer (UAE)

- United Arab Emirates won the toss and elected to field.

30 October 2023
13:15
Scorecard

Hong Kong; 166/6 (20 overs)	v	Kuwait; 150/8 (20 overs)
Martin Coetzee 81 (48); Sayed Monib 2/39 (4 overs)		Mohammed Aslam 52 (39); Aizaz Khan 3/30 (4 overs)

Hong Kong won by 16 runs
Mulpani International Cricket Ground, Kageshwari-Manohara
Umpires: Viswanadan Kalidas (Mas) and Sarika Prasad (Sin)
Player of the match: Martin Coetzee (HK)

- Kuwait won the toss and elected to field.

31 October 2023
09:00
Scorecard

Bahrain; 146 (19.3 overs)	v	Hong Kong; 126 (19.1 overs)
Imran Ali 62 (43); Nasrulla Rana 3/21 (3.3 overs)		Anshuman Rath 28 (30); Abdul Majid 3/7 (3.1 overs)

Bahrain won by 20 runs
Mulpani International Cricket Ground, Kageshwari-Manohara
Umpires: Viswanadan Kalidas (Mas) and Buddhi Pradhan (Nep)
Player of the match: Imran Ali (Bhr)

- Hong Kong won the toss and elected to field.

31 October 2023
13:15
Scorecard

Kuwait; 88/8 (20 overs)	v	United Arab Emirates; 94/5 (14.2 overs)
Ravija Sandaruwan 22 (14); Zahoor Khan 2/13 (4 overs)		Muhammad Waseem 33 (23); Mohammed Aslam 3/17 (4 overs)

United Arab Emirates won by 5 wickets
Mulpani International Cricket Ground, Kageshwari-Manohara
Umpires: Buddhi Pradhan (Nep) and Sarika Prasad (Sin)
Player of the match: Ali Naseer (UAE)

- Kuwait won the toss and elected to bat.

2 November 2023
09:00
Scorecard

United Arab Emirates; 176/6 (20 overs)	v	Hong Kong; 154/8 (20 overs)
Basil Hameed 51 (29); Yasim Murtaza 3/14 (4 overs)		Anshy Rath 59 (47); Ali Naseer 2/29 (4 overs)

United Arab Emirates won by 22 runs
Mulpani International Cricket Ground, Kageshwari-Manohara
Umpires: Viswanadan Kalidas (Mas) and Sarika Prasad (Sin)
Player of the match: Basil Hameed (UAE)

- Hong Kong won the toss and elected to field.

2 November 2023
13:15
Scorecard

Bahrain; 158/9 (20 overs)	v	Kuwait; 160/6 (16.3 overs)
Imran Anwar 37 (25); Shiraz Khan 2/22 (4 overs)		Usman Patel 64 (34); Ali Dawood 2/23 (4 overs)

Kuwait won by 4 wickets
Mulpani International Cricket Ground, Kageshwari-Manohara
Umpires: Viswanadan Kalidas (Mas) and Buddhi Pradhan (Nep)
Player of the match: Usman Patel (Kuw)

- Kuwait won the toss and elected field.

== Knockout Stage ==
=== Bracket ===
Semi-finals
A1	Oman	109/0 (14.2 overs)
B2	Bahrain	106/9 (20 overs)
B1	United Arab Emirates	134/9 (20 overs)
A2	Nepal	135/2 (17.1 overs)

Final
SF1W	Oman	184/9 (20 overs); 21/0 (Super Over)
SF2W	Nepal	184/6 (20 overs); 10/1 (Super Over)

=== Semi-finals ===
Semi-final 1
3 November 2023
11:00
Scorecard

Bahrain; 106/9 (20 overs)	v	Oman; 109/0 (14.2 overs)
Imran Ali 30 (23); Aqib Ilyas 4/10 (4 overs)		Kashyap Prajapati 57* (44)

Oman won by 10 wickets
Tribhuvan University International Cricket Ground, Kirtipur
Umpires: Lyndon Hannibal (SL) and Buddhi Pradhan (Nep)
Player of the match: Aqib Ilyas (Oma)

- Bahrain won the toss and elected to bat.

Semi-final 2
3 November 2023
11:00
Scorecard

United Arab Emirates; 134/9 (20 overs)	v	Nepal; 135/2 (17.1 overs)
Vriitya Aravind 64 (51); Kushal Malla 3/11 (3 overs)		Aasif Sheikh 64* (51); Basil Hameed 1/18 (2 overs)

Nepal won by 8 wickets
Mulpani International Cricket Ground, Kageshwari-Manohara
Umpires: Rashid Riaz (Pak) and Gazi Sohel (Ban)
Player of the match: Aasif Sheikh (Nep)

- United Arab Emirates won the toss and elected to bat.

=== Final ===
Final
5 November 2023
11:00
Scorecard

Nepal; 184/6 (20 overs)	v	Oman; 184/9 (20 overs)
Gulsan Jha 54 (25); Bilal Khan 3/26 (4 overs)		Kashyap Prajapati 63 (52); Karan KC 2/30 (2 overs)

Match tied (Oman won the Super Over)
Tribhuvan University International Cricket Ground, Kirtipur
Umpires: Rashid Riaz (Pak) and Gazi Sohel (Ban)
Player of the match: Kashyap Prajapati (Oma)

- Nepal won the toss and elected to bat.
- Super Over: Oman 21/0, Nepal 10/1.
