= 2022 Cricket World Cup Challenge League A (Malaysia) =

Cricket tournament

2022 Malaysia Cricket World Cup Challenge League A
- Dates: 3 – 13 December 2022
- Administrator: International Cricket Council
- Cricket format: List A
- Tournament format: Round-robin
- Host: Malaysia Cricket Association
- Participants: 6
- Matches: 15
- Most runs: (Qatar) Akash Babu (162)
- Most wickets: (Canada) Kaleem Sana (16)

The 2022 Malaysia Cricket World Cup Challenge League A was the third round of matches in Group A of the 2019–2022 Cricket World Cup Challenge League, a cricket tournament which formed part of the qualification pathway to the 2023 Cricket World Cup. In October 2019, the International Cricket Council (ICC) confirmed that the Malaysia Cricket Association would host the tournament, with the series scheduled to take place between 16 and 26 March 2020. All of the matches had List A status.

In March 2020, the ICC confirmed that the tournament had been postponed due to the COVID-19 pandemic, with the aim of playing it later in the year. Prior to the March postponement, Canada, Denmark and Vanuatu had named their squads for the tournament. On 24 March 2020, an ICC media release stated that the tournament would be scheduled to take place from 30 September to 10 October 2020. However, on 25 August 2020, the ICC confirmed that the tournament had been postponed due to the pandemic. In April 2021, the ICC announced that the tournament would be played during November and December 2021. Eventually the series began in December 2022, with Canada in a strong position to progress.

On 6 December 2022, Canada defeated Singapore by 187 runs to secure first place in Challenge League A and a place in the 2023 ICC Cricket World Cup Qualifier Play-off.

== Squads ==
Canada	Denmark	Malaysia	Qatar	Singapore	Vanuatu
Saad Bin Zafar (c); Nikhil Dutta; Jeremy Gordon; Dillon Heyliger; Aaron Johnson; Nicholas Kirton; Shreyas Movva (wk); Salman Nazar; Kaleem Sana; Pargat Singh; Ravinderpal Singh; Matthew Spoors; Harsh Thaker; Srimantha Wijeratne (wk)	Hamid Shah (c); Saif Ahmad; Surya Anand; Saran Aslam; Taranjit Bharaj (wk); Oliver Hald; Abdul Hashmi (wk); Jino Jojo; ~~Ehsan Karimi~~; Zameer Khan; Nicolaj Laegsgaard; Abdullah Mahmood; Saud Munir; Musa Shaheen; Shangeev Thanikaithasan	Ahmad Faiz (c); Muhammad Amir; Syed Aziz; Rizwan Haider; Khizar Hayat; Syazrul Idrus; Sidharth Karthik (wk); Sharvin Muniandy; Syed Rehmatullah (wk); Muhamad Syahadat; Pavandeep Singh; Virandeep Singh; Vijay Unni; Muhammad Wafiq; Zubaidi Zulkifle	Mohammed Rizlan (c, wk); Yousuf Ali; Akash Babu; Assad Borham; Zaheer Ibrahim; Ikramullah Khan; Kamran Khan; Imal Liyanage; Gayan Munaweera; Mohammed Nadeem; Dharmang Patel; Syed Tameem; Muhammad Tanveer; Valeed Veetil	Amjad Mahboob (c); Vinoth Baskaran; Abdul Rahman Bhadelia; Aman Desai (wk); Avi Dixit; Aritra Dutta; Vihaan Hampihalikar; Amartya Kaul; Aaryan Modi; Janak Prakash; Jeevan Santhanam; Ishaan Swaney; Manpreet Singh; Sidhanth Srikanth; Aryaman Sunil; Neil Karnik	Patrick Matautaava (c); Junior Kaltapau (vc); Jarryd Allan; Godfrey Mangau; Williamsing Nalisa; Nalin Nipiko; Simpson Obed; Joshua Rasu; Kenny Tari; Ronald Tari; Jamal Vira (wk); Bettan Viraliliu; Darren Wotu; Obed Yosef

== Fixtures ==
3 December 2022
09:30
Scorecard

Vanuatu; 144 (41 overs)	v	Singapore; 123 (38 overs)
Ronald Tari 30 (57); Amjad Mahboob 4/20 (9 overs)		Aryaman Sunil 23 (16); Nalin Nipiko 5/38 (10 overs)

Vanuatu won by 21 runs
Bayuemas Oval, Kuala Lumpur
Umpires: Rahul Asher (Oma) and Tabarak Dar (HK)
Player of the match: Nalin Nipiko (Van)

- Vanuatu won the toss and elected to bat.
- Abdul Rahman Bhadelia, Avi Dixit, Aritra Dutta and Sidhanth Srikanth (Sin) all made their List A debuts.

4 December 2022
09:30
Scorecard

Denmark; 159 (34.4 overs)	v	Malaysia; 160/8 (35.3 overs)
Taranjit Bharaj 45 (63); Rizwan Haider 3/26 (5.4 overs)		Syed Aziz 47 (70); Nicolaj Laegsgaard 2/33 (8 overs)

Malaysia won by 2 wickets
Bayuemas Oval, Kuala Lumpur
Umpires: Rahul Asher (Oma) and Sarika Prasad (Sin)
Player of the match: Sharvin Muniandy (Mas)

- Denmark won the toss and elected to bat.
- The match was reduced to 36 overs per side due to rain.
- Rizwan Haider, Syazrul Idrus, Syed Rehmatullah, Zubaidi Zulkifle (Mas), Saran Aslam and Taranjit Bharaj (Den) all made their List A debuts.

4 December 2022
09:30
Scorecard

Qatar; 146 (49.2 overs)	v	Canada; 147/6 (30.1 overs)
Ikramullah Khan 53 (86); Kaleem Sana 5/27 (9.2 overs)		Nicholas Kirton 65* (81); Gayan Munaweera 2/30 (6 overs)

Canada won by 4 wickets
UKM-YSD Cricket Oval, Bangi
Umpires: Viswanadan Kalidas (Mas) and Ramasamy Venkatesh (HK)

- Canada won the toss and elected to field.
- Aaron Johnson (Can) and Yousuf Ali (Qat) both made their List A debuts.

6 December 2022
09:30
Scorecard

Canada; 294/9 (50 overs)	v	Singapore; 107 (28.2 overs)
Pargat Singh 83 (86); Akshay Puri 5/32 (10 overs)		Aritra Dutta 22 (29); Saad Bin Zafar 5/18 (6.2 overs)

Canada won by 187 runs
Bayuemas Oval, Kuala Lumpur
Umpires: Rahul Asher (Oma) and Viswanadan Kalidas (Mas)
Player of the match: Pargat Singh (Can)

- Canada won the toss and elected to bat.

6 December 2022
09:30
Scorecard

Vanuatu; 188/9 (50 overs)	v	Malaysia; 192/5 (38.2 overs)
Junior Kaltapau 64 (112); Sharvin Muniandy 4/8 (8 overs)		Ahmad Faiz 75* (104); Patrick Matautaava 2/11 (4 overs)

Malaysia won by 5 wickets
UKM-YSD Cricket Oval, Bangi
Umpires: Sarika Prasad (Sin) and Ramasamy Venkatesh (HK)
Player of the match: Ahmad Faiz (Mas)

- Malaysia won the toss and elected to field.

7 December 2022
09:30
Scorecard

Vanuatu; 172 (43.2 overs)	v	Qatar; 173/6 (43.5 overs)
Joshua Rasu 47 (66); Muhammad Tanveer 2/4 (3 overs)		Muhammad Tanveer 66* (110); Simpson Obed 2/20 (10 overs)

Qatar won by 4 wickets
Bayuemas Oval, Kuala Lumpur
Umpires: Tabarak Dar (HK) and Sarika Prasad (Sin)
Player of the match: Muhammad Tanveer (Qat)

- Qatar won the toss and elected to field.
- Godfrey Mangau (Van) made his List A debut.

7 December 2022
09:30
Scorecard

Singapore; 217/9 (50 overs)	v	Denmark; 218/8 (46.2 overs)
Aritra Dutta 99 (113); Surya Anand 4/33 (10 overs)		Nicolaj Laegsgaard 61 (58); Amjad Mahboob 3/36 (10 overs)

Denmark won by 2 wickets
UKM-YSD Cricket Oval, Bangi
Umpires: Rahul Asher (Oma) and Ramasamy Venkatesh (HK)
Player of the match: Nicolaj Laegsgaard (Den)

- Denmark won the toss and elected to field.
- Ishaan Swaney (Sin) made his List A debut.

9 December 2022
09:30
Scorecard

Denmark; 163 (43 overs)	v	Canada; 127/3 (25.5 overs)
Nicolaj Laegsgaard 60 (61); Kaleem Sana 4/13 (7 overs)		Srimantha Wijeratne 72 (73); Oliver Hald 2/19 (4 overs)

Canada won by 7 wickets (DLS method)
Bayuemas Oval, Kuala Lumpur
Umpires: Tabarak Dar (HK) and Viswanadan Kalidas (Mas)
Player of the match: Kaleem Sana (Can)

- Canada won the toss and elected to field.
- Canada were set a revised target of 127 runs in 30 overs due to rain.

9 December 2022
09:30
Scorecard

Qatar; 235/8 (50 overs)	v	Malaysia; 114 (33.5 overs)
Akash Babu 71 (75); Sharvin Muniandy 4/60 (10 overs)		Muhammad Amir 57 (80); Mohammed Nadeem 5/18 (7 overs)

Qatar won by 121 runs
UKM-YSD Cricket Oval, Bangi
Umpires: Sarika Prasad (Sin) and Ramasamy Venkatesh (HK)
Player of the match: Mohammed Nadeem (Qat)

- Malaysia won the toss and elected to field.

10 December 2022
09:30
Scorecard

Singapore; 198/8 (49 overs)	v	Malaysia; 142/2 (33.3 overs)
Manpreet Singh 83 (132); Rizwan Haider 5/50 (10 overs)		Syed Aziz 48* (66); Vinoth Baskaran 1/19 (4 overs)

Malaysia won by 34 runs (DLS method)
Bayuemas Oval, Kuala Lumpur
Umpires: Tabarak Dar (HK) and Ramasamy Venkatesh (HK)
Player of the match: Rizwan Haider (Mas)

- Singapore won the toss and elected to bat.
- The match was reduced to 49 overs per side due to rain. No further play was possible due to rain.
- Sidharth Karthik (Mas) made his List A debut.

10 December 2022
09:30
Scorecard

Denmark; 292/8 (50 overs)	v	Vanuatu; 95/3 (27 overs)
Shangeev Thanikaithasan 59 (68); Williamsing Nalisa 2/41 (7 overs)		Jarryd Allan 31 (69); Saif Ahmad 1/12 (6 overs)

Denmark won by 49 runs (DLS method)
UKM-YSD Cricket Oval, Bangi
Umpires: Rahul Asher (Oma) and Viswanadan Kalidas (Mas)
Player of the match: Shangeev Thanikaithasan (Den)

- Denmark won the toss and elected to bat.
- No further play was possible due to rain

12 December 2022
09:30
Scorecard

Canada	v	Vanuatu

Match abandoned
Bayuemas Oval, Kuala Lumpur
Umpires: Tabarak Dar (HK) and Sarika Prasad (Sin)

- No toss.
- No play was possible due to rain.

12 December 2022
09:30
Scorecard

Qatar; 228 (50 overs)	v	Singapore; 128/9 (22 overs)
Akash Babu 73 (94); Aryaman Sunil 4/52 (10 overs)		Manpreet Singh 35 (38); Mohammed Nadeem 2/27 (5 overs)

Qatar won by 17 runs (DLS method)
UKM-YSD Cricket Oval, Bangi
Umpires: Rahul Asher (Oma) and Viswanadan Kalidas (Mas)

- Singapore won the toss and elected to field.
- Singapore were set a revised target of 146 runs in 22 overs.
- Syed Tameem, Valeed Veetil (Qat) and Jeevan Santhanam (Sin) all made their List A debuts.

13 December 2022
09:30
Scorecard

Qatar	v	Denmark

Match abandoned
Bayuemas Oval, Kuala Lumpur
Umpires: Tabarak Dar (HK) and Viswanadan Kalidas (Mas)

- No toss.
- No play was possible due to rain.

13 December 2022
09:30
Scorecard

Canada; 240/8 (47 overs)	v	Malaysia; 51 (21.3 overs)
Srimantha Wijeratne 74 (91); Rizwan Haider 2/32 (9 overs)		Ahmad Faiz 18 (26); Kaleem Sana 5/22 (6 overs)

Canada won by 189 runs
UKM-YSD Cricket Oval, Bangi
Umpires: Sarika Prasad (Sin) and Ramasamy Venkatesh (HK)
Player of the match: Kaleem Sana (Can)

- Canada won the toss and elected to bat.
- The match was reduced to 47 overs per side due to rain.
