= 2023 Men's T20 World Cup Asia sub-regional qualifiers =

Cricket qualification tournaments

The 2024 ICC Men's T20 World Cup was the ninth edition of the ICC Men's T20 World Cup, a biennial world cup for cricket in Twenty20 International (T20I) format, organized by the International Cricket Council (ICC).

== Description ==
The qualification process for the world cup included two stages: direct qualification and regional qualification. The regional qualification for Asia was held in two stages: sub-regional qualifiers and regional final. The Asia region's sub-regional phase consisted of two sub-regional qualifiers, hosted by Qatar Cricket Association and Malaysian Cricket Association from 28 September to 5 October and 26 July to 1 August 2023 respectively.

Kuwait progressed to the regional final after finishing atop the qualifier A's points table. Kuwait's Meet Bhavsar scored the most runs (262) while Saudi Arabia's Hisham Sheikh and Qatar's Himanshu Rathod took the most wickets (12 each) in the tournament.

Malaysia progressed to the regional final after finishing atop the qualifier B's points table. Malaysia's Virandeep Singh was named player of the series while Ahmad Faiz scored the most runs (115) and Syazrul Idrus took the most wickets (10) in the tournament.

== Qualifier A ==
2023 ICC Men's T20 World Cup Asia sub-regional qualifier A
- Dates: 28 September – 5 October 2023
- Administrator(s): International Cricket Council; Asian Cricket Council
- Cricket format: Twenty20 International
- Tournament format: Double round-robin
- Host: Qatar
- Champions: Kuwait
- Runners-up: Saudi Arabia
- Participants: 4
- Matches: 12
- Most runs: (Kuwait) Meet Bhavsar (262)
- Most wickets: (Saudi Arabia) Hisham Sheikh (12) (Qatar) Himanshu Rathod (12)

Squads for the qualifier A
Kuwait	Maldives	Qatar	Saudi Arabia
Mohammed Aslam (c); Shiraz Khan (vc); Ilyas Ahmed; Ahsan ul Haq; Clinto Anto; Meet Bhavsar (wk); Adnan Idrees; Parvindar Kumar; Nimish Lathief; Sayed Monib; Usman Patel (wk); Yasin Patel; Shahrukh Quddus; Ravija Sandaruwan; Mohamed Shafeeq; Bilal Tahir; Ali Zaheer	Umar Adam (c); Azyan Farhath (vc); Savindra Amaradasa; Mohamed Azzam (wk); Ibrahim Hassan; Shaof Hassan; Chandana Liyanage; Wedage Malinda; Ameel Mauroof; Ibrahim Nashath; Mohamed Rishwan; Ibrahim Rizan; Kaushal Rodrigo; Leem Shafeeg	Muhammad Murad (c); Muhammad Tanveer (vc); Mohammad Ahnaff; Yousuf Ali; Uzair Amir (wk); Saqlain Arshad; Mirza Mohammed Baig; Bukhar Illikkal; Mohammed Irshad; Muhammad Jabir; Ikramullah Khan; Jassim Khan; Bipin Kumar; Imal Liyanage (wk); Adnan Mirza; Himanshu Rathod	Hisham Sheikh (c); Ishtiaq Ahmad; Manan Ali; Ahmed Baladraf; Atif-Ur-Rehman; Haseeb Ghafoor (wk); Faisal Khan; Saad Khan; Khalander Mustafa; Usman Najeeb; Umair Sharif; Zain Ul Abidin; Waqar Ul Hassan; Abdul Waheed

=== Qualifier A fixtures ===
Pos	Team	Pld	W	L	NR	Pts	NRR	Qualification
1	Kuwait	6	5	1	0	10	2.202	Advance to the regional final
2	Saudi Arabia	6	5	1	0	10	1.447	
3	Qatar	6	2	4	0	4	0.349	
4	Maldives	6	0	6	0	0	−4.332	

Source: ESPNcricinfo

28 September 2023
09:00
Scorecard

Qatar; 123/6 (20 overs)	v	Kuwait; 124/3 (15.4 overs)
Imal Liyanage 46 (49); Ilyas Ahmed 2/23 (4 overs)		Ravija Sandaruwan 42 (29); Himanshu Rathod 3/20 (4 overs)

Kuwait won by 7 wickets
West End Park International Cricket Stadium, Doha
Umpires: Rahul Asher (Oma) and Bismillah Jan Shinwari (Afg)
Player of the match: Ravija Sandaruwan (Kuw)

- Kuwait won the toss and elected to field.
- Mohammad Ahnaff (Qat) made his T20I debut.

28 September 2023
13:30
Scorecard

Saudi Arabia; 172/5 (20 overs)	v	Maldives; 110/7 (20 overs)
Abdul Waheed 58 (35); Ameel Mauroof 2/24 (4 overs)		Azyan Farhath 43 (44); Hisham Sheikh 4/12 (4 overs)

Saudi Arabia won by 62 runs
West End Park International Cricket Stadium, Doha
Umpires: Rahul Asher (Oma) and Shivani Mishra (Qat)
Player of the match: Hisham Sheikh (Sau)

- Saudi Arabia won the toss and elected to bat.
- Savindra Amaradasa, Kaushal Rodrigo (Mdv) and Waqar Ul Hassan (Sau) all made their T20I debuts.

29 September 2023
09:00
Scorecard

Maldives; 100/7 (20 overs)	v	Kuwait; 103/3 (12.2 overs)
Azyan Farhath 29 (46); Mohammed Aslam 2/11 (3 overs)		Meet Bhavsar 60* (41); Leem Shafeeg 2/25 (3.2 overs)

Kuwait won by 7 wickets
West End Park International Cricket Stadium, Doha
Umpires: Shivani Mishra (Qat) and Bismillah Jan Shinwari (Afg)
Player of the match: Meet Bhavsar (Kuw)

- Kuwait won the toss and elected to field.

29 September 2023
13:30
Scorecard

Qatar; 109 (19.3 overs)	v	Saudi Arabia; 110/6 (19.4 overs)
Saqlain Arshad 27 (24); Hisham Sheikh 4/14 (4 overs)		Hisham Sheikh 29* (33); Himanshu Rathod 2/21 (4 overs)

Saudi Arabia won by 4 wickets
West End Park International Cricket Stadium, Doha
Umpires: Rahul Asher (Oma) and Bismillah Jan Shinwari (Afg)
Player of the match: Hisham Sheikh (Sau)

- Qatar won the toss and elected to bat.

1 October 2023
09:00
Scorecard

Maldives; 121/9 (20 overs)	v	Qatar; 125/1 (10.2 overs)
Kaushal Rodrigo 71 (54); Muhammad Murad 3/21 (4 overs)		Saqlain Arshad 61* (32); Umar Adam 1/35 (4 overs)

Qatar won by 9 wickets
West End Park International Cricket Stadium, Doha
Umpires: Rahul Asher (Oma) and Bismillah Jan Shinwari (Afg)
Player of the match: Saqlain Arshad (Qat)

- Qatar won the toss and elected to field.

1 October 2023
13:30
Scorecard

Kuwait; 174/9 (20 overs)	v	Saudi Arabia; 175/7 (19.4 overs)
Meet Bhavsar 89 (55); Ishtiaq Ahmad 5/27 (4 overs)		Faisal Khan 69 (34); Sayed Monib 4/16 (3.4 overs)

Saudi Arabia won by 3 wickets
West End Park International Cricket Stadium, Doha
Umpires: Rahul Asher (Oma) and Shivani Mishra (Qat)
Player of the match: Faisal Khan (Sau)

- Kuwait won the toss and elected to bat.

2 October 2023
09:00
Scorecard

Qatar; 129/6 (20 overs)	v	Kuwait; 130/5 (16.1 overs)
Muhammad Tanveer 69* (52); Mohammed Aslam 3/15 (4 overs)		Ravija Sandaruwan 71 (40); Muhammad Murad 2/23 (3 overs)

Kuwait won by 5 wickets
West End Park International Cricket Stadium, Doha
Umpires: Rahul Asher (Oma) and Bismillah Jan Shinwari (Afg)
Player of the match: Ravija Sandaruwan (Kuw)

- Kuwait won the toss and elected to field.
- Nimish Lathief (Kuw) made his T20I debut.

2 October 2023
13:30
Scorecard

Maldives; 76 (18.2 overs)	v	Saudi Arabia; 78/1 (7.5 overs)
Kaushal Rodrigo 26 (41); Ahmed Baladraf 3/14 (4 overs)		Faisal Khan 46* (25); Leem Shafeeg 1/9 (1 over)

Saudi Arabia won by 9 wickets
West End Park International Cricket Stadium, Doha
Umpires: Shivani Mishra (Qat) and Bismillah Jan Shinwari (Afg)
Player of the match: Faisal Khan (Sau)

- Maldives won the toss and elected to bat.

4 October 2023
09:00
Scorecard

Maldives; 83/6 (20 overs)	v	Kuwait; 84/2 (7.5 overs)
Kaushal Rodrigo 23 (29); Yasin Patel 2/10 (4 overs)		Meet Bhavsar 28 (20); Ibrahim Hassan 1/23 (2 overs)

Kuwait won by 8 wickets
West End Park International Cricket Stadium, Doha
Umpires: Rahul Asher (Oma) and Shivani Mishra (Qat)
Player of the match: Meet Bhavsar (Kuw)

- Kuwait won the toss and elected to field.
- Mirza Ahmed (Kuw) made his T20I debut.

4 October 2023
13:30
Scorecard

Qatar; 168/3 (20 overs)	v	Saudi Arabia; 170/3 (18.3 overs)
Saqlain Arshad 76 (41); Hisham Sheikh 2/21 (4 overs)		Manan Ali 52* (37); Saqlain Arshad 1/8 (1 over)

Saudi Arabia won by 7 wickets
West End Park International Cricket Stadium, Doha
Umpires: Rahul Asher (Oma) and Bismillah Jan Shinwari (Afg)
Player of the match: Manan Ali (Sau)

- Qatar won the toss and elected to bat.

5 October 2023
09:00
Scorecard

Qatar; 201/7 (20 overs)	v	Maldives; 159 (17.2 overs)
Muhammad Tanveer 52 (23); Umar Adam 2/49 (4 overs)		Umar Adam 56 (29); Himanshu Rathod 4/29 (4 overs)

Qatar won by 42 runs
West End Park International Cricket Stadium, Doha
Umpires: Rahul Asher (Oma) and Bismillah Jan Shinwari (Afg)
Player of the match: Muhammad Tanveer (Qat)

- Maldives won the toss and elected to field.
- Shaof Hassan (Mdv) made his T20I debut.

5 October 2023
13:30
Scorecard

Saudi Arabia; 173/4 (20 overs)	v	Kuwait; 175/6 (18.2 overs)
Abdul Waheed 83 (58); Sayed Monib 2/29 (4 overs)		Meet Bhavsar 55 (27); Zain Ul Abidin 2/23 (4 overs)

Kuwait won by 4 wickets
West End Park International Cricket Stadium, Doha
Umpires: Shivani Mishra (Qat) and Bismillah Jan Shinwari (Afg)
Player of the match: Meet Bhavsar (Kuw)

- Kuwait won the toss and elected to field.

== Qualifier B ==
2023 ICC Men's T20 World Cup Asia sub-regional qualifier B
- Tournament logo
- Dates: 26 July – 1 August 2023
- Administrator(s): International Cricket Council; Asian Cricket Council
- Cricket format: Twenty20 International
- Tournament format: Round-robin
- Host: Malaysia
- Champions: Malaysia
- Runners-up: Thailand
- Participants: 5
- Matches: 10
- Player of the series: (Malaysia) Virandeep Singh
- Most runs: (Malaysia) Ahmad Faiz (115)
- Most wickets: (Malaysia) Syazrul Idrus (10)

Squads for the qualifier B
Bhutan	China	Malaysia
Suprit Pradhan (c); Namgay Thinley (vc); Sanjog Chhetri (wk); Sonam Chophel (wk); Karma Dorji; Ranjung Mikyo Dorji; Gakul Ghalley; Kishen Ghalley; Sherab Loday; Anand Mongar; Tashi Phuntsho; Tenjin Rabgey; Tenzin Wangchuk; Sonam Yeshey	Wang Qi (c); Wei Guo Lei (vc, wk); Yin Chenhao; Deng Jinqi; Zou Kui; Xie Kunkun; Wang Liuyang (wk); Ma Qiancheng; Tian Sen Qun; Luo Shilin; Zhao Tianle; Zong Yuechao; Zhuang Zelin; Chen Zhuo Yue	Ahmad Faiz (c); Virandeep Singh (vc, wk); Muhammad Akram; Muhammad Amir; Syed Aziz (wk); Ainool Hafizs (wk); Rizwan Haider; Khizar Hayat; Syazrul Idrus; Aiman Zaquan Ridzuan; Pavandeep Singh; Sharveen Surendran; Vijay Unni; Zubaidi Zulkifle
Myanmar	Thailand	
Thuya Aung (c); Htet Lin Aung; Myat Thu Aung; Khin Aye (wk); Paing Danu; Nay Lin Htun; Aung Ko Ko; Swann Htet Ko Ko (wk); Kaung Htet Kyaw; Htet Lin Oo; Nyeing Cham Soe; Ko Ko Lin Thu; Ye Naing Tun (wk); Pyae Phyo Wai	Akshaykumar Yadav (c); Chaloemwong Chatphaisan (wk); Jandre Coetzee; Phanuwat Desungnoen; Sorawat Desungnoen; Sarawut Maliwan; Khanitson Namchaikul; Narawit Nuntarach; Chanchai Pengkumta; Robert Raina; Satarut Rungrueang (wk); Yodsak Saranonnakkun; Nopphon Senamontree; Phiriyapong Suanchuai (wk)	

=== Qualifier B fixtures ===
Pos	Team	Pld	W	L	NR	Pts	NRR	Qualification
1	Malaysia	4	4	0	0	8	5.986	Advance to the regional final
2	Thailand	4	3	1	0	6	2.927	
3	Bhutan	4	2	2	0	4	−0.085	
4	China	4	1	3	0	2	−3.537	
5	Myanmar	4	0	4	0	0	−4.196	

Source: ESPNcricinfo

26 July 2023
09:00
Scorecard

China; 23 (11.2 overs)	v	Malaysia; 24/2 (4.5 overs)
Wei Guo Lei 7 (15); Syazrul Idrus 7/8 (4 overs)		Virandeep Singh 19* (14); Wang Qi 1/5 (2 overs)

Malaysia won by 8 wickets
Bayuemas Oval, Pandamaran
Umpires: Vrinda Rathi (Ind) and Ramasamy Venkatesh (HK)
Player of the match: Syazrul Idrus (Mas)

- China won the toss and elected to bat.
- Sharveen Surendran (Mas), Yin Chenhao, Xie Kunkun, Wei Guo Lei, Ma Qiancheng, Wang Liuyang, Wang Qi, Tian Sen Qun, Luo Shilin, Zhao Tianle, Zhuang Zelin and Chen Zhuo Yue (Chn) all made their T20I debuts.
- Syazrul Idrus (Mas) became the first bowler to take seven wickets in a men's T20I.

26 July 2023
13:30
Scorecard

Bhutan; 105 (20 overs)	v	Myanmar; 74/9 (20 overs)
Sherab Loday 18 (16); Pyae Phyo Wai 3/29 (4 overs)		Ye Naing Tun 19 (17); Karma Dorji 2/4 (2 overs)

Bhutan won by 31 runs
Bayuemas Oval, Pandamaran
Umpires: Viswanadan Kalidas (Mas) and Ramasamy Venkatesh (HK)
Player of the match: Tashi Phuntsho (Bhu)

- Bhutan won the toss and elected to bat.
- Karma Dorji, Kishen Ghalley, Tashi Phuntsho (Bhu), Htet Lin Aung, Thuya Aung, Khin Aye, Paing Danu, Nay Lin Htun, Aung Ko Ko, Swann Htet Ko Ko, Htet Lin Oo, Ko Ko Lin Thu, Ye Naing Tun and Pyae Phyo Wai (Mya) all made their T20I debuts.

27 July 2023
09:30
Scorecard

China; 26 (10.5 overs)	v	Thailand; 27/1 (4.1 overs)
Wei Guo Lei 8 (16); Nopphon Senamontree 4/9 (2.5 overs)		Sorawat Desungnoen 16* (15); Wang Qi 1/7 (2 overs)

Thailand won by 9 wickets
Bayuemas Oval, Pandamaran
Umpires: Viswanadan Kalidas (Mas) and Vrinda Rathi (Ind)
Player of the match: Nopphon Senamontree (Tha)

- Thailand won the toss and elected to field.
- Jandre Coetzee, Sarawut Maliwan and Akshaykumar Yadav (Tha) all made their T20I debuts.

27 July 2023
13:30
Scorecard

Malaysia; 180/7 (20 overs)	v	Bhutan; 105/8 (20 overs)
Zubaidi Zulkifle 36 (19); Tenzin Wangchuk 2/28 (4 overs)		Suprit Pradhan 22 (27); Virandeep Singh 2/14 (4 overs)

Malaysia won by 75 runs
Bayuemas Oval, Pandamaran
Umpires: Vrinda Rathi (Ind) and Ramasamy Venkatesh (HK)
Player of the match: Virandeep Singh (Mas)

- Bhutan won the toss and elected to field.

28 July 2023
09:00
Scorecard

Thailand; 140/6 (20 overs)	v	Myanmar; 39 (16 overs)
Robert Raina 42 (30); Thuya Aung 2/23 (4 overs)		Pyae Phyo Wai 8 (18); Khaniston Namchaikul 4/7 (4 overs)

Thailand won by 101 runs
Bayuemas Oval, Pandamaran
Umpires: Ramasamy Venkatesh (HK) and Viswanadan Kalidas (Mas)
Player of the match: Jandre Coetzee (Tha)

- Myanmar won the toss and elected to field.
- Nyeing Cham Soe (Mya) made his T20I debut.

30 July 2023
09:00
Scorecard

Bhutan; 161/4 (20 overs)	v	China; 48 (11.4 overs)
Suprit Pradhan 59 (41); Ma Qiancheng 1/17 (4 overs)		Wei Guo Lei 15 (14); Namgay Thinley 3/3 (2.4 overs)

Bhutan won by 95 runs (DLS method)
Bayuemas Oval, Pandamaran
Umpires: Viswanadan Kalidas (Mas) and Vrinda Rathi (Ind)
Player of the match: Suprit Pradhan (Bhu)

- Bhutan won the toss and elected to bat.
- China were set a revised target of 144 runs from 17 overs due to rain.
- Anand Mongar (Bhu), Deng Jinqi and Zong Yuechao (Chn) all made their T20I debuts.

30 July 2023
13:30
Scorecard

Malaysia; 219/6 (20 overs)	v	Myanmar; 35 (15.5 overs)
Ahmad Faiz 105* (50); Htet Lin Oo 2/40 (3 overs)		Ye Naing Tun 10 (15); Syazrul Idrus 2/5 (3 overs)

Malaysia won by 184 runs
Bayuemas Oval, Pandamaran
Umpires: Vrinda Rathi (Ind) and Ramasamy Venkatesh (HK)
Player of the match: Ahmad Faiz (Mas)

- Myanmar won the toss and elected to field.
- Myat Thu Aung (Mya) made his T20I debut.
- Ahmad Faiz (Mas) scored his first century in T20Is.

31 July 2023
09:00
Scorecard

Bhutan; 83 (18.2 overs)	v	Thailand; 84/2 (10.1 overs)
Tenzin Rabgay 22 (27); Robert Raina 2/18 (4 overs)		Akshaykumar Yadav 31* (28); Tashi Phuntsho 1/22 (2 overs)

Thailand won by 8 wickets
Bayuemas Oval, Pandamaran
Umpires: Viswanadan Kalidas (Mas) and Ramasamy Venkatesh (HK)
Player of the match: Akshaykumar Yadav (Tha)

- Thailand won the toss and elected to field.

31 July 2023
13:30
Scorecard

Myanmar; 77/8 (20 overs)	v	China; 78/5 (17.2 overs)
Pyae Phyo Wai 17 (25); Chen Zhuo Yue 4/16 (4 overs)		Zhuang Zelin 33 (41); Paing Danu 2/15 (4 overs)

China won by 5 wickets
Bayuemas Oval, Pandamaran
Umpires: Viswanadan Kalidas (Mas) and Vrinda Rathi (Ind)
Player of the match: Chen Zhuo Yue (Chn)

- China won the toss and elected to field.
- Zou Kui (Chn) made his T20I debut.

1 August 2023
09:00
Scorecard

Thailand; 93 (18.2 overs)	v	Malaysia; 96/3 (11.4 overs)
Akshaykumar Yadav 23 (23); Vijay Unni 4/23 (4 overs)		Syed Aziz 45* (32); Robert Raina 2/17 (3 overs)

Malaysia won by 7 wickets
Bayuemas Oval, Pandamaran
Umpires: Vrinda Rathi (Ind) and Ramasamy Venkatesh (HK)
Player of the match: Vijay Unni (Mas)

- Malaysia won the toss and elected to field.
