= 2019 Malaysia Tri-Nation Series =

- Date: 24–29 June 2019
- Location: Malaysia
- Result: Malaysia won the series
- Player of the series: (Maldives) Nilantha Cooray
Teams
Malaysia	Maldives	Thailand
Captains
Ahmad Faiz	Mohamed Mahfooz	Vichanath Singh
Most runs
Syed Aziz (156)	Nilantha Cooray (101)	Naveed Pathan (134)
Most wickets
Anwar Rahman (7)	Umar Adam (7)	Mahsid Faheem (6)

The 2019 Malaysia Tri-Nation Series was a Twenty20 International (T20I) cricket tournament held in Malaysia.

The series took place from 24 to 29 June 2019. The participating teams were Malaysia, Maldives and Thailand. Papua New Guinea were also included in the original schedule for a quadrangular tournament, but later withdrew. The matches were played at the Kinrara Oval in Kuala Lumpur. Malaysia and Thailand both played their first matches with T20I status during this tournament, following the decision of the ICC to grant full Twenty20 International status to all its members from 1 January 2019. Maldives played three 20-over warm up matches against an MCA President XI side from 19 to 21 June 2019. On the penultimate day, Malaysia secured the title after their last fixture against Maldives, a rain-affected match, finished in a no result. The fixtures were part of Malaysia's preparation for the Regional Finals of the 2018–19 ICC T20 World Cup Asia Qualifier tournament in July 2019. Maldives all-rounder Nilantha Cooray was named player of the series, after scoring 101 runs and taking six wickets in the four matches he played.

== Squads ==
Malaysia	Maldives	Thailand
Ahmad Faiz (c); Anwar Arudin; Syed Aziz; Neville Liyanage; Sharvin Muniandy; Anwar Rahman; Nazril Rahman; Aminuddin Ramly; Fitri Sham; Shafiq Sharif; Virandeep Singh; Pasha Syafiq Ali; Muhamad Syahadat	Mohamed Mahfooz (c); Umar Adam; Chandana Liyanage; Nilantha Cooray; Muaviath Ganee; Ahmed Hassan; Ibrahim Hassan; Shafraz Jaleel; Wedage Malinda; Ameel Mauroof; Hassan Rasheed; Mohamed Rishwan; Shafee Saeed; Ihala Kumara	Vichanath Singh (c); Mahsid Faheem; Md Shafiqul Haque; Sittipong Hongsi; Ziaul Hoque; Anowarul Islam; Daniel Jacobs; Nicholas Janes; Henno Jordaan; Naveed Pathan; Chanchai Pengkumta; Kamron Senamontree; Kiatiwut Suttisan

== Tour matches ==
=== 1st T20 match ===
19 June 2019
Scorecard

MCA President XI; 105/8 (20 overs)	v	Maldives; 109/5 (18.2 overs)
Pasha Syafiq Ali 29 (33); Chandana Liyanage 3/15 (4 overs)		Mohamed Rishwan 37 (34); Amiruddin Azahar 1/9 (3 overs)

Maldives won by 5 wickets
Selangor Turf Club, Selangor

- MCA President XI won the toss and elected to bat.

=== 2nd T20 match ===
20 June 2019
Scorecard

Maldives; 92 (19.2 overs)	v	MCA President XI; 93/3 (13.3 overs)
Hassan Rasheed 17 (28); Muhamad Syahadat 3/10 (4 overs)		Aminuddin Ramly 28 (22); Nilantha Cooray 2/13 (2 overs)

MCA President XI won by 7 wickets
Selangor Turf Club, Selangor

- Maldives won the toss and elected to bat.

=== 3rd T20 match ===
21 June 2019
Scorecard

Maldives; 177/2 (20 overs)	v	MCA President XI; 41/6 (8.1 overs)
Mohamed Rishwan 102* (54); Muhammad Hafiz 1/16 (4 overs)		Ainool Hafizs 14 (16); Mohamed Mahfooz 2/4 (2 overs)

Maldives won by 59 runs (DLS method)
Selangor Turf Club, Selangor
Player of the match: Mohamed Rishwan (Mdv)

- Maldives won the toss and elected to bat.
- MCA President XI were set a revised target of 101 runs from 8 overs due to rain.

== Points table ==
Pos	Team	Pld	W	L	T	NR	Pts	NRR
1	Malaysia (H)	4	3	0	0	1	7	2.367
2	Maldives	4	1	2	0	1	3	−1.327
3	Thailand	4	1	3	0	0	2	−0.700

(H) Host

== Matches ==
24 June 2019
10:00
Scorecard

Thailand; 113/8 (20 overs)	v	Malaysia; 114/5 (17 overs)
Naveed Pathan 37 (28); Muhamad Syahadat 3/7 (4 overs)		Muhamad Syahadat 41* (32); Mahsid Faheem 2/26 (4 overs)

Malaysia won by 5 wickets
Kinrara Oval, Kuala Lumpur
Umpires: Viswanadan Kalidas (Mas) and Mathan Kumar (Mas)
Player of the match: Muhamad Syahadat (Mas)

- Malaysia won the toss and elected to field.
- Anwar Arudin, Syed Aziz, Ahmad Faiz, Neville Liyanage, Sharvin Muniandy, Nazril Rahman, Aminuddin Ramly, Fitri Sham, Shafiq Sharif, Virandeep Singh, Muhamad Syahadat (Mas), Mahsid Faheem, Md Shafiqul Haque, Ziaul Hoque, Anowarul Islam, Daniel Jacobs, Henno Jordaan, Naveed Pathan, Chanchai Pengkumta, Kamron Senamontree, Vichanath Singh and Kiatiwut Suttisan (Tha) all made their T20I debuts.

25 June 2019
10:00
Scorecard

Malaysia; 186/5 (20 overs)	v	Maldives; 113 (16.3 overs)
Syed Aziz 53* (24); Nilantha Cooray 3/26 (4 overs)		Ahmed Hassan 40 (23); Anwar Rahman 3/7 (1.3 overs)

Malaysia won by 73 runs
Kinrara Oval, Kuala Lumpur
Umpires: Viswanadan Kalidas (Mas) and Shafizan Shahriman (Mas)
Player of the match: Syed Aziz (Mas)

- Maldives won the toss and elected to field.
- Anwar Rahman (Mas), Nilantha Cooray, Shafraz Jaleel and Chandana Liyanage (Mdv) all made their T20I debuts.

26 June 2019
10:00
Scorecard

Thailand; 130/7 (20 overs)	v	Maldives; 131/8 (20 overs)
Naveed Pathan 34 (31); Umar Adam 3/17 (3 overs)		Nilantha Cooray 40 (34); Mahsid Faheem 2/20 (4 overs)

Maldives won by 2 wickets
Kinrara Oval, Kuala Lumpur
Umpires: Viswanadan Kalidas (Mas) and Loganathan Poobalan (Mas)
Player of the match: Nilantha Cooray (Mdv)

- Thailand won the toss and elected to bat.
- Wedage Malinda (Mdv), Sittipong Hongsi and Nicholas Janes (Tha) all made their T20I debuts.

27 June 2019
10:00
Scorecard

Thailand; 127/7 (20 overs)	v	Malaysia; 129/2 (15 overs)
Henno Jordaan 37* (44); Anwar Rahman 4/16 (4 overs)		Syed Aziz 57* (38); Mahsid Faheem 1/19 (2 overs)

Malaysia won by 8 wickets
Kinrara Oval, Kuala Lumpur
Umpires: Viswanadan Kalidas (Mas) and Zaidan Taha (Mas)
Player of the match: Anwar Rahman (Mas)

- Thailand won the toss and elected to bat.
- Pasha Syafiq Ali (Mas) made his T20I debut.

28 June 2019
10:00
Scorecard

Malaysia; 123/5 (17 overs)	v	Maldives
Shafiq Sharif 43 (31); Umar Adam 2/18 (4 overs)

No result
Kinrara Oval, Kuala Lumpur
Umpires: Izmir Azraf (Mas) and Viswanadan Kalidas (Mas)

- Malaysia won the toss and elected to bat.
- No further play was possible due to rain.

29 June 2019
10:00
Scorecard

Maldives; 153/6 (20 overs)	v	Thailand; 154/5 (19.1 overs)
Nilantha Cooray 56* (35); Daniel Jacobs 4/13 (4 overs)		Naveed Pathan 54* (39); Nilantha Cooray 2/23 (4 overs)

Thailand won by 5 wickets
Kinrara Oval, Kuala Lumpur
Umpires: Viswanadan Kalidas (Mas) and Narayanan Sivan (Mas)
Player of the match: Naveed Pathan (Tha)

- Thailand won the toss and elected to field.
