= Anwar Arudin =

Malaysian cricketer (born 1984)

Personal information
- Full name: Mohammad Anwar Arudin
- Born: 9 July 1984 (age 42)
- Batting: Left-handed

International information
- National side: Malaysia
- T20I debut (cap 2): 24 June 2019 v Thailand
- Last T20I: 22 April 2021 v Nepal
Medal record
Representing Malaysia
Men's Cricket
Southeast Asian Games
Gold medal – first place	2017 Kuala Lumpur	50 over
Silver medal – second place	2017 Kuala Lumpur	Twenty20
- Source: Cricinfo, 22 April 2021

Anwar Arudin (born 9 July 1984) is a Malaysian cricketer. He played in the 2014 ICC World Cricket League Division Three tournament. He was named the captain of Malaysia for the 2018 ICC World Cricket League Division Four tournament, also held in Malaysia.

He was in Malaysia's squad for the 2018 Asia Cup Qualifier tournament. In October 2018, he was named in Malaysia's squad in the Eastern sub-region group for the 2018–19 ICC World Twenty20 Asia Qualifier tournament.

In June 2019, he was named in Malaysia's squad for the 2019 Malaysia Tri-Nation Series tournament. He made his Twenty20 International (T20I) debut in a five-wicket Malaysian victory over Thailand, on 24 June 2019.
