= Henno Jordaan =

South African cricketer (born 1988)

Personal information
- Full name: Hendrik Johannes Jordaan
- Born: 16 October 1988 (age 38); Pretoria, South Africa
- Batting: Right-handed
- Bowling: Right-arm medium

International information
- National side: Thailand (2019–present)
- T20I debut (cap 5): 24 June 2019 v Malaysia
- Last T20I: 4 March 2020 v Nepal

Career statistics
Competition	First-class	List A
Matches	2	5
Runs scored	22	27
Batting average	7.33	5.40
100s/50s	0/0	0/0
Top score	10	18
Balls bowled	0	0
Wickets	-	-
Bowling average	-	-
5 wickets in innings	-	-
10 wickets in match	-	-
Best bowling	-	-
Catches/stumpings	0/–	1/–
- Source: ESPNCricinfo, 4 March 2020

Hendrik Johannes "Henno" Jordaan (born 16 October 1988) is a South African cricketer who now plays for the Thailand national cricket team. He is a right-handed batsman and right-arm medium pace bowler and played in 2 first-class matches and 5 List A matches for Boland cricket team between 2009 and 2012.

In June 2019, he was named in the Thailand's squad for the 2019 Malaysia Tri-Nation Series tournament. He made his Twenty20 International (T20I) debut for Thailand, against Malaysia, on 24 June 2019.
