= Pasha Syafiq Ali =

Malaysian cricketer (born 1996)

Personal information
- Born: 19 January 1996 (age 30)

International information
- National side: Malaysia
- T20I debut (cap 13): 27 June 2019 v Thailand
- Last T20I: 28 June 2019 v Maldives
- Source: Cricinfo, 22 July 2019

Pasha Syafiq Ali (born 19 January 1996) is a Malaysian cricketer who plays for the Malaysia national cricket team. Ali made his Twenty20 International (T20I) debut against Thailand on 27 June 2019 in the 2019 Malaysia Tri-Nation Series. In July 2019, he was named in Malaysia's squad for the Regional Finals of the 2018–19 ICC T20 World Cup Asia Qualifier tournament.
