= Ian Thomson (umpire) =

Australian cricket umpire (born 1963)

Personal information
- Full name: Ian Arthur Thomson
- Born: 15 January 1963 (age 63); Sydney, Australia
- Role: Umpire

Umpiring information
- ODIs umpired: 1 (2016)
- WT20Is umpired: 5 (2019)
- Source: ESPNcricinfo, 8 November 2016

Ian Thomson (born 15 January 1963) is an Australian cricket umpire. Thomson serves as a member of the ICC Associate and Affiliate Panel of Umpires representing Hong Kong.

He stood in his first One Day International (ODI) match on 8 November 2016, between Hong Kong and Papua New Guinea.

== See also ==
- List of One Day International cricket umpires
