= Shafiq Sharif =

Malaysian cricketer

Personal information
- Born: 10 March 1990 (age 36)
- Batting: Right-handed

International information
- National side: Malaysia
- T20I debut (cap 9): 24 June 2019 v Thailand
- Last T20I: 21 April 2021 v Netherlands
Medal record
Representing Malaysia
Men's Cricket
Southeast Asian Games
Gold medal – first place	2017 Kuala Lumpur	50 over
Silver medal – second place	2017 Kuala Lumpur	Twenty20
- Source: Cricinfo, 21 April 2021

Shafiq Sharif (born 10 March 1990) is a Malaysian cricketer. He was part of Malaysia's squad for the 2008 Under-19 Cricket World Cup. He played in the 2014 ICC World Cricket League Division Three tournament.

He was a member of the Malaysian cricket team which claimed gold medal in the men's 50 overs tournament after defeating Singapore by 251 runs in the finals at the 2017 Southeast Asian Games.

In April 2018, he was named in Malaysia's squad for the 2018 ICC World Cricket League Division Four tournament, also in Malaysia. In August 2018, he was named in Malaysia's squad for the 2018 Asia Cup Qualifier tournament. Sharif was in Malaysia's squad in the Eastern sub-region group for the 2018–19 ICC World Twenty20 Asia Qualifier tournament. He was among the leading run-scorers in the tournament, with 129 runs in six matches.

In June 2019, he was named in Malaysia's squad for the 2019 Malaysia Tri-Nation Series tournament. He made his Twenty20 International (T20I) against Thailand on 24 June 2019. In September 2019, he was named in Malaysia's squad for the 2019 Malaysia Cricket World Cup Challenge League A tournament. He made his List A debut for Malaysia, against Denmark, in the Cricket World Cup Challenge League A tournament on 16 September 2019.
