= Nilantha Cooray =

Sri Lankan cricketer (born 1978)

Personal information
- Born: 20 January 1978 (age 48); Moratuwa, Sri Lanka
- Batting: Right-handed
- Bowling: Right-arm leg break
- Role: All-rounder

International information
- National side: Maldives
- T20I debut (cap 14): 25 June 2019 v Malaysia
- Last T20I: 25 February 2020 v Oman
- Source: Cricinfo, 25 February 2020

Nilantha Cooray (born 20 January 1978) is a Sri Lankan cricketer who now plays for the Maldives national cricket team. He played in 100 first-class matches and 72 List A matches in Sri Lanka between 1998 and 2012. He is also the national Level-3 coach of the Maldives.

He was a member of the Maldives' squad for the 2019 Malaysia Tri-Nation Series tournament, contested by Malaysia, Maldives and Thailand. He made his Twenty20 International (T20I) debut for the Maldives, against Malaysia, on 25 June 2019. He was named the Player of the Series, after scoring 101 runs and taking six wickets in the four matches he played.
