= Syazrul Idrus =

Malaysian cricketer

Personal information
- Full name: Syazrul Ezat Idrus
- Born: 9 January 1991 (age 35)
- Batting: Right-handed
- Bowling: Right-arm medium
- Role: Bowler

International information
- National side: Malaysia (2012–present)
- T20I debut (cap 20): 1 October 2019 v Vanuatu
- Last T20I: 26 July 2023 v China
- Source: ESPNcricinfo, 26 July 2023

Syazrul Ezat Idrus (born 9 January 1991) is a Malaysian cricketer. He has played for the Malaysia national cricket team since 2012, as a right-arm medium pace bowler.

== Personal life ==
Syazrul was born on 9 January 1991. In 2015 he married professional squash player Zulhijjah Binti Azan.

== Domestic career ==
In Malaysian domestic cricket, Syazrul has played for Malaysian Armed Forces and also represented the Royal Malaysian Air Force team at the 2015 International Defence Cricket Challenge in Australia. In 2015 he and Fitri Sham were sent to play club cricket for Kalutara Town Club in Sri Lanka as part of an exchange program.

== International career ==
Syazrul was named in the Malaysia national under-19 cricket team squad for the 2007 ACC Under-19 Elite Cup. He was a member of Malaysia's senior squad for the 2012 ACC Trophy Elite.

Syazrul made his Twenty20 International debut against Vanuatu in October 2019. He recorded a hat-trick against Thailand in the 2022 Malaysia Quadrangular Series. He made his List A debut against Denmark in December 2022 during the 2022 Cricket World Cup Challenge League A.

Syazrul received three silver medals as part of Malaysia's squad in cricket at the 2023 SEA Games. In the opening match of the 2023 ICC Men's T20 World Cup Asia Qualifier B, against China, he recorded bowling figures of 7/8 from four overs, becoming the first player to take seven wickets in a men's Twenty20 International.
