= Anwar Rahman =

Malaysian cricketer

Personal information
- Full name: Muhammad Anwar Rahman
- Born: 23 September 1996 (age 30)
- Batting: Right-handed
- Bowling: Slow left-arm orthodox

International information
- National side: Malaysia
- T20I debut (cap 12): 25 June 2019 v Maldives
- Last T20I: 15 December 2022 v Bahrain
Medal record
Representing Malaysia
Men's Cricket
Southeast Asian Games
Gold medal – first place	2017 Kuala Lumpur	50 over
Silver medal – second place	2017 Kuala Lumpur	Twenty20
- Source: ESPNCricinfo, 15 December 2022

Anwar Rahman (born 23 September 1996) is a Malaysian cricketer. A right-handed batsman, he bowls slow left-arm orthodox spin. He played in the 2014 ICC World Cricket League Division Five tournament. In April 2018, he was named in Malaysia's squad for the 2018 ICC World Cricket League Division Four tournament, also in Malaysia.

In August 2018, he was named in Malaysia's squad for the 2018 Asia Cup Qualifier tournament. He was part of Malaysia's squad in the Eastern sub-region group for the 2018–19 ICC World Twenty20 Asia Qualifier tournament. He was among the leading wicket-takers in the tournament, with ten dismissals in six matches.

In June 2019, he was named in Malaysia's squad for the 2019 Malaysia Tri-Nation Series tournament. He made his Twenty20 International (T20I) debut for Malaysia, against the Maldives, on 25 June 2019, taking a wicket with his first delivery. In September 2019, he was named in Malaysia's squad for the 2019 Malaysia Cricket World Cup Challenge League A tournament. He made his List A debut for Malaysia, against Denmark, in the Cricket World Cup Challenge League A tournament on 16 September 2019.
