= Martin Coetzee =

Hong Kong cricketer

Personal information
- Born: 12 October 1988 (age 38); Johannesburg, South Africa
- Batting: Right-handed
- Role: Batsman

International information
- National side: Hong Kong
- T20I debut (cap 47): 19 October 2023 v Nepal
- Last T20I: 31 October 2023 v Bahrain
- Source: ESPNcricinfo, 31 October 2023

Martin Coetzee (born 12 October 1988) is a South African-born cricketer who plays international cricket for Hong Kong.

== Career ==
Coetzee made his Twenty20 debut for Gauteng in the 2018 Africa T20 Cup on 14 September 2018. He made his first-class debut for Gauteng in the 2018–19 CSA 3-Day Provincial Cup on 4 October 2018.

Coetzee's career in South Africa stalled in 2019 after he was released from his provincial contract. Contemplating retirement, he relocated to Hong Kong for non-cricketing reasons when his wife accepted a teaching position. He initially intended to play cricket only recreationally.

Upon joining the Hong Kong Cricket Club, he discovered a highly organized and competitive local cricket scene with a clear pathway to international representation through a three-year residency qualification. This inspired him to pursue a career with the national team. After completing his residency, Coetzee established himself as a top-order batter for Hong Kong. Outside of his national duties, he works as a professional coach.
