= 2018–19 Men's T20 World Cup Asia qualifier =

Cricket tournament

The 2018–19 ICC T20 World Cup Asia Qualifier was the tournament played as part of qualification process for the 2021 ICC T20 World Cup.

Twelve regional qualifiers were held by the International Cricket Council (ICC), with 62 teams competed during 2018 in five regions – Africa (3 groups), Americas (2), Asia (2), East Asia Pacific (2) and Europe (3). The top 25 sides from these progressed to five Regional Finals in 2019, with seven teams then going on to compete in the 2019 ICC T20 World Cup Qualifier., (Note: The United Arab Emirates initially qualified to the Asia Regional Final, but later automatically progressed to the qualifier tournament as the host.) along with the six lowest ranked sides from the ICC T20I Championship.

The first Asian sub-regional qualifier was held in Kuwait from 20 to 27 April 2018. The second sub-regional qualifier took place in Malaysia between 3 and 12 October 2018. The top three teams in each group advanced to the regional finals tournament, which will determine two Asian entrants to the 2019 ICC T20 World Cup Qualifier. In April 2018, the International Cricket Council (ICC) granted full international status to Twenty20 men's matches played between member sides from 1 January 2019 onwards. Therefore, all the matches in the Regional Finals will be played as Twenty20 Internationals (T20Is).

From the Western sub-region group, the United Arab Emirates were the first team to qualify for the regional final. They were joined by Qatar and Kuwait. From the Eastern sub-region group, Nepal, Singapore and Malaysia qualified for the regional final. However, in March 2019, the ICC announced that the UAE would host the qualifier tournament. Later the same month, the ICC released the match schedule for all the Regional Finals, with the UAE omitted from the Asia Regional Final. The number of teams that could qualify from the Asia Regional Final was also reduced from two to one.

The Regional Finals were held in Singapore in July 2019. Singapore progressed to the T20 World Cup Qualifier after winning the Regional Finals.

== Teams ==
Eastern sub-regional Group	Western sub-regional Group
Bhutan; China; Malaysia; Myanmar; Nepal; Singapore; Thailand	Bahrain; Kuwait; Maldives; Qatar; Saudi Arabia; United Arab Emirates

== Western sub-region tournament ==
2018 ICC T20 World Cup Asian Western Sub-Regional Qualifier
- Dates: 20 – 26 April 2018
- Administrator: ICC Asia
- Cricket format: T20
- Tournament format(s): Round-robin and Playoffs
- Host: Kuwait
- Champions: United Arab Emirates
- Participants: 6
- Most runs: (United Arab Emirates) Rohan Mustafa (165)
- Most wickets: (Saudi Arabia) Imran Arif (12)

=== Points table ===
Team	Pld	W	L	T	NR	Pts	NRR	Status
United Arab Emirates (Q)	5	5	0	0	0	10	+2.433	Advance to Sub-Regional Final and 2019 ICC World Twenty20 Asian Regional Finals
Qatar (Q)	5	4	1	0	0	8	+0.968	Advance to Sub-Regional Final and 2019 ICC World Twenty20 Asian Regional Finals
Saudi Arabia	5	3	2	0	0	6	+0.817	Advance to Sub-Regional third-place play-off
Kuwait (H,Q)	5	2	3	0	0	4	–0.512	Advance to Sub-Regional third-place play-off
Bahrain	5	1	4	0	0	2	–1.308	
Maldives	5	0	5	0	0	0	–2.297	

(H) Host. (Q) Advanced to the Regional Finals. Kuwait advanced to the Regional Finals after defeating Saudi Arabia in the third-place play-off match

=== Fixtures ===
20 April 2018
10:00
Scorecard

Kuwait; 170/4 (20 overs)	v	Maldives; 68 (16.4 overs)
Mohammed Asghar 66* (38); Mohamed Saafee 2/26 (4 overs)		Mohamed Azzam 13 (27); Imran Ali 5/2 (2.4 overs)

Kuwait won by 102 runs
Sulaibiya Cricket Ground, Sulaibiya
Umpires: Shivani Mishra (Qat) and Vinod Babu (Oma)
Player of the match: Imran Ali (Kuw)

- Kuwait won the toss and elected to bat.
- Imran Ali (Kuw) took a hat-trick.

20 April 2018
10:00
Scorecard

Qatar; 143/6 (20 overs)	v	United Arab Emirates; 144/4 (18.3 overs)
Faisal Javed 40 (26); Mohammad Naveed 3/31 (4 overs)		Rohan Mustafa 71 (45); Awais Malik 1/19 (3 overs)

United Arab Emirates won by 6 wickets
Entertainment City Ground, Kuwait City
Umpires: Buddhi Pradhan (Nep) and Rahat Ali (Sau)
Player of the match: Rohan Mustafa (UAE)

- Qatar won the toss and elected to bat.

20 April 2018
14:00
Scorecard

Bahrain; 106 (19.5 overs)	v	Saudi Arabia; 107/3 (15.2 overs)
Imran Anwar 24 (24); Khawar Abbas 4/17 (3.5 overs)		Abdul Waheed 35 (16); Sikander Billah 1/6 (2 overs)

Saudi Arabia won by 7 wickets
Sulaibiya Cricket Ground, Sulaibiya
Umpires: Vinod Babu (Oma) and Iftikhar Ali (UAE)
Player of the match: Khawar Abbas (Sau)

- Bahrain won the toss and elected to bat.

21 April 2018
10:00
Scorecard

Qatar; 167/6 (20 overs)	v	Kuwait; 141/9 (20 overs)
Kamran Khan 49 (28); Imran Ali 3/18 (4 overs)		Usman Waheed 66 (36); Inam-ul-Haq 4/22 (4 overs)

Qatar won by 26 runs
Sulaibiya Cricket Ground, Sulaibiya
Umpires: Buddhi Pradhan (Nep) and Iftikhar Ali (UAE)
Player of the match: Inam-ul-Haq (Qat)

- Qatar won the toss and elected to bat.

21 April 2018
10:00
Scorecard

Maldives; 140/5 (20 overs)	v	Bahrain; 142/4 (19.3 overs)
Nilantha Cooray 65 (51); Zeeshan Abbas 1/18 (4 overs)		Shahbaz Badar 56 (43); Ibrahim Rizan 1/13 (2 overs)

Bahrain won by 6 wickets
Entertainment City Ground, Kuwait City
Umpires: Imran Mustafa (Kuw) and Shivani Mishra (Qat)
Player of the match: Shahbaz Badar (Bhr)

- Bahrain won the toss and elected to field.

21 April 2018
14:00
Scorecard

Saudi Arabia; 103/9 (20 overs)	v	United Arab Emirates; 104/3 (13.4 overs)
Inayat Saeed 21 (31); Imran Haider 3/6 (4 overs)		Ashfaq Ahmed 46* (41); Shahbaz Rasheed 1/14 (1.4 overs)

United Arab Emirates won by 7 wickets
Entertainment City Ground, Kuwait City
Umpires: Imran Mustafa (Kuw) and Vinod Babu (Oma)
Player of the match: Ashfaq Ahmed (UAE)

- Saudi Arabia won the toss and elected to bat.

23 April 2018
10:00
Scorecard

Qatar; 149/7 (20 overs)	v	Maldives; 105/7 (20 overs)
Muhammad Tanveer 53 (41); Umar Adam 2/17 (2 overs)		Nilantha Cooray 27 (28); Iqbal Hussain 3/14 (4 overs)

Qatar won by 44 runs
Entertainment City Ground, Kuwait City
Umpires: Vinod Babu (Oma) and Iftikhar Ali (UAE)
Player of the match: Muhammad Tanveer (Qat)

- Qatar won the toss and elected to bat.

23 April 2018
10:00
Scorecard

United Arab Emirates; 149/9 (20 overs)	v	Bahrain; 98/8 (20 overs)
Muhammad Usman 52 (33); Sikander Billah 3/27 (3 overs)		Yasser Nazir 26 (42); Qadeer Ahmed 4/17 (4 overs)

United Arab Emirates won by 51 runs
Sulaibiya Cricket Ground, Sulaibiya
Umpires: Shivani Mishra (Qat) and Rahat Ali (Sau)
Player of the match: Qadeer Ahmed (UAE)

- Bahrain won the toss and elected to field.

23 April 2018
14:00
Scorecard

Kuwait; 92 (19.3 overs)	v	Saudi Arabia; 96/3 (11.4 overs)
Ali Zaheer 27 (36); Usman Ali 5/23 (4 overs)		Imran Arif 28 (30); Muhammad Kashif 2/15 (3 overs)

Saudi Arabia won by 7 wickets
Entertainment City Ground, Kuwait City
Umpires: Vinod Babu (Oma) and Iftikhar Ali (UAE)
Player of the match: Usman Ali (Sau)

- Saudi Arabia won the toss and elected to field.

24 April 2018
10:00
Scorecard

United Arab Emirates; 123 (19.5 overs)	v	Maldives; 80 (16.3 overs)
Muhammad Usman 43 (52); Azyan Farhath 2/15 (4 overs)		Hassan Rasheed 17 (23); Rohan Mustafa 3/18 (4 overs)

United Arab Emirates won by 43 runs
Sulaibiya Cricket Ground, Sulaibiya
Umpires: Buddhi Pradhan (Nep) and Vinod Babu (Oma)
Player of the match: Muhammad Usman (UAE)

- United Arab Emirates won the toss and elected to bat.

24 April 2018
14:00
Scorecard

Saudi Arabia; 135/7 (20 overs)	v	Qatar; 136/6 (18.5 overs)
Shahbaz Rasheed 36 (32); Nouman Sarwar 2/21 (2 overs)		Tamoor Sajjad 35 (27); Imran Arif 3/33 (4 overs)

Qatar won by 4 wickets
Sulaibiya Cricket Ground, Sulaibiya
Umpires: Imran Mustafa (Kuw) and Buddhi Pradhan (Nep)
Player of the match: Tamoor Sajjad (Qat)

- Qatar won the toss and elected to field.

24 April 2018
14:00
Scorecard

Kuwait; 153/6 (20 overs)	v	Bahrain; 130 (19.4 overs)
Ravija Sandaruwan 34* (9); Imran Anwar 2/31 (4 overs)		Prashant Kurup 43 (42); Arjun Makesh 4/21 (4 overs)

Kuwait won by 23 runs
Entertainment City Ground, Kuwait City
Umpires: Rahat Ali (Sau) and Iftikhar Ali (UAE)
Player of the match: Arjun Makesh (Kuw)

- Kuwait won the toss and elected to bat.

26 April 2018
10:00
Scorecard

United Arab Emirates; 201/4 (20 overs)	v	Kuwait; 115/8 (20 overs)
Chirag Suri 86 (52); Sajid Manzil 2/33 (3 overs)		Muhammad Kashif 33 (34); Rohan Mustafa 3/18 (4 overs)

United Arab Emirates won by 86 runs
Entertainment City Ground, Kuwait City
Umpires: Buddhi Pradhan (Nep) and Shivani Mishra (Qat)
Player of the match: Rohan Mustafa (UAE)

- Kuwait won the toss and elected to field.

26 April 2018
10:00
Scorecard

Bahrain; 112/8 (20 overs)	v	Qatar; 115/5 (16.4 overs)
Bilal Mansoor 20* (5); Awais Malik 3/23 (4 overs)		Zaheer Ibrahim 43* (37); Waseeq Ahmed 1/17 (4 overs)

Qatar won by 5 wickets
Sulaibiya Cricket Ground, Sulaibiya
Umpires: Iftikhar Ali (UAE) and Imran Mustafa (Kuw)
Player of the match: Zaheer Ibrahim (Qat)

- Qatar won the toss and elected to field.

26 April 2018
14:00
Scorecard

Saudi Arabia; 154/6 (20 overs)	v	Maldives; 119/9 (20 overs)
Shahbaz Rasheed 38* (21); Nilantha Cooray 2/21 (4 overs)		Nilantha Cooray 47 (42); Mohammed Afzal 3/18 (4 overs)

Saudi Arabia won by 35 runs
Sulaibiya Cricket Ground, Sulaibiya
Umpires: Imran Mustafa (Kuw) and Vinod Babu (Oma)
Player of the match: Mohammed Afzal (Sau)

- Saudi Arabia won the toss and elected to bat.

=== Third-place play-off ===
27 April 2018
10:00
Scorecard

Kuwait; 104 (18 overs)	v	Saudi Arabia; 99/4 (18 overs)
Muhammad Kashif 26 (19); Mohammed Afzal 3/22 (4 overs)		Imran Arif 40 (35); Arjun Makesh 2/11 (3 overs)

Kuwait won by 5 runs
Entertainment City Ground, Kuwait City
Umpires: Buddhi Pradhan (Nep) and Iftikhar Ali (UAE)
Player of the match: Arjun Makesh (Kuw)

- Kuwait won the toss and elected to bat.
- The match was reduced to 18 overs per side.

=== Final ===
27 April 2018
14:00
Scorecard

Qatar; 115 (18.4 overs)	v	United Arab Emirates; 121/1 (15.5 overs)
Tamoor Sajjad 36 (41); Zahoor Khan 3/16 (3.4 overs)		Ghulam Shabber 63* (46); Tamoor Sajjad 1/22 (2 overs)

United Arab Emirates won by 9 wickets
Entertainment City Ground, Kuwait City
Umpires: Rahat Ali (Sau) and Imran Mustafa (Kuw)
Player of the match: Ghulam Shabber (UAE)

- Qatar won the toss and elected to bat.

== Eastern sub-region tournament ==
2018 ICC T20 World Cup Asian Eastern Sub-Regional Qualifier
- Dates: 3 – 12 October 2018
- Administrator: ICC Asia
- Cricket format: T20
- Tournament format: Round-robin
- Host: Malaysia
- Champions: Nepal
- Participants: 7
- Matches: 21
- Player of the series: (Nepal) Sandeep Lamichhane
- Most runs: (Singapore) Surendran Chandramohan (148)
- Most wickets: (Nepal) Sandeep Lamichhane (24)

=== Points table ===
Team	Pld	W	L	T	NR	Pts	NRR	Status
Nepal (Q)	6	5	0	0	1	11	+7.782	Advance to 2019 ICC World Twenty20 Asian Regional Finals
Singapore (Q)	6	5	0	0	1	11	+4.772	Advance to 2019 ICC World Twenty20 Asian Regional Finals
Malaysia (H,Q)	6	3	2	0	1	7	+1.066	Advance to 2019 ICC World Twenty20 Asian Regional Finals
Thailand	6	3	2	0	1	7	–0.586	
Bhutan	6	2	4	0	0	4	–1.761	
Myanmar	6	1	5	0	0	2	–2.462	
China	6	0	6	0	0	0	–8.354	

(H) Host (Q) Qualified

=== Fixtures ===
3 October 2018
10:00
Scorecard

Malaysia; 154/6 (20 overs)	v	Bhutan; 87/9 (20 overs)
Suhan Alagaratnam 35 (27); Sanjeevan Gurung 3/26 (3 overs)		Jigme Singye 21 (21); Anwar Rahman 4/8 (4 overs)

Malaysia won by 67 runs
Bayuemas Oval, Pandamaran
Umpires: Sarika Prasad (Sin) and Ian Thomson (HK)
Player of the match: Anwar Rahman (Mas)

- Bhutan won the toss and elected to field.

3 October 2018
10:00
Scorecard

China; 35/9 (20 overs)	v	Thailand; 36/0 (2.4 overs)
Wang Ya 8 (11); Daniel Jacobs 3/8 (4 overs)		Daniel Jacobs 19* (8)

Thailand won by 10 wickets
UKM Cricket Oval, Bangi
Umpires: Viswanadan Kalidas (Mas) and Chettithody Shamshuddin (Ind)
Player of the match: Daniel Jacobs (Tha)

- China won the toss and elected to bat.

3 October 2018
14:30
Scorecard

Myanmar; 29 (10 overs)	v	Nepal; 30/2 (3 overs)
Htet Lin Aung 16 (20); Sandeep Lamichhane 4/3 (2 overs)		Karan KC 14* (8); Paing Danu 1/3 (1 over)

Nepal won by 8 wickets
Bayuemas Oval, Pandamaran
Umpires: Tabarak Dar (HK) and Sarika Prasad (Sin)
Player of the match: Sandeep Lamichhane (Nep)

- Myanmar won the toss and elected to bat.

4 October 2018
10:00
Scorecard

China; 45 (12.5 overs)	v	Bhutan; 47/1 (3.5 overs)
Chen Jinfeng 5 (11); Jigme Singye 3/7 (2.5 overs)		Jigme Singye 30* (15); Wang Ya 1/10 (0.5 overs)

Bhutan won by 9 wickets
Bayuemas Oval, Pandamaran
Umpires: Chettithody Shamshuddin (Ind) and Durga Subedi (Nep)
Player of the match: Jigme Singye (Bhu)

- China won the toss and elected to bat.

4 October 2018
10:00
Scorecard

Malaysia; 124/7 (18 overs)	v	Thailand
Shafiq Sharif 54 (38); Vichanath Singh 3/24 (4 overs)

No result
UKM Cricket Oval, Bangi
Umpires: Sarika Prasad (Sin) and Ian Thomson (HK)

- Thailand won the toss and elected to field.

4 October 2018
14:30
Scorecard

Myanmar; 68 (19.5 overs)	v	Singapore; 69/2 (6.4 overs)
Ye Naing Tun 42 (45); Janak Prakash 3/15 (2.5 overs)		Chetan Suryawanshi 31* (16); Ye Ko Ko Aung 1/19 (2 overs)

Singapore won by 8 wickets
Bayuemas Oval, Pandamaran
Umpires: Viswanadan Kalidas (Mas) and Durga Subedi (Nep)
Player of the match: Janak Prakash (Sin)

- Myanmar won the toss and elected to bat.

6 October 2018
10:00
Scorecard

Malaysia; 100 (19.3 overs)	v	Nepal; 101/2 (12.4 overs)
Shafiq Sharif 49 (37); Sandeep Lamichhane 5/20 (4 overs)		Paras Khadka 52* (37); Pavandeep Singh 1/27 (2 overs)

Nepal won by 8 wickets
Bayuemas Oval, Pandamaran
Umpires: Tabarak Dar (HK) and Ian Thomson (HK)
Player of the match: Sandeep Lamichhane (Nep)

- Malaysia won the toss and elected to bat.

6 October 2018
10:00
Scorecard

China; 26 (14.1 overs)	v	Singapore; 30/0 (2.3 overs)
Wang Ya 5 (19); Manpreet Singh 3/1 (2 overs)		Chaminda Ruwan 16* (6)

Singapore won by 10 wickets
UKM Cricket Oval, Bangi
Umpires: Chettithody Shamshuddin (Ind) and Durga Subedi (Nep)
Player of the match: Manpreet Singh (Sin)

- Singapore won the toss and elected to field.

6 October 2018
14:30
Scorecard

Bhutan; 82 (19.4 overs)	v	Thailand; 83/2 (13.3 overs)
Tandin Wangchuk 25 (36); Nopphon Senamontree 3/18 (4 overs)		Nicholas Janes 36* (41); Ramesh Limbu 1/8 (2 overs)

Thailand won by 8 wickets
Bayuemas Oval, Pandamaran
Umpires: Sarika Prasad (Sin) and Ian Thomson (HK)
Player of the match: Nopphon Senamontree (Tha)

- Thailand won the toss and elected to field.

7 October 2018
10:00
Scorecard

Singapore; 145/9 (20 overs)	v	Malaysia; 105 (20 overs)
Chaminda Ruwan 41 (36); Syed Aziz 2/21 (3 overs)		Virandeep Singh 39 (41); Anantha Krishna 4/14 (4 overs)

Singapore won by 40 runs
Bayuemas Oval, Pandamaran
Umpires: Chettithody Shamshuddin (Ind) and Ian Thomson (HK)
Player of the match: Anantha Krishna (Sin)

- Singapore won the toss and elected to bat.

7 October 2018
10:00
Scorecard

China; 48 (15.2 overs)	v	Myanmar; 49/2 (7.5 overs)
Tian Sen Qun 10 (12); Htet Lin Aung 4/11 (4 overs)		Ko Ko Lin Thu 18 (19); Qingshan Tan 1/12 (1.5 overs)

Myanmar won by 8 wickets
UKM Cricket Oval, Bangi
Umpires: Viswanadan Kalidas (Mas) and Durga Subedi (Nep)
Player of the match: Htet Lin Aung (Mya)

- Myanmar won the toss and elected to field.

7 October 2018
14:30
Scorecard

Nepal; 172/7 (20 overs)	v	Thailand; 18/9 (8.5 overs)
Karan KC 40* (14); Payuputh Sungnard 4/21 (4 overs)		Wanchana Uisuk 7 (12); Sandeep Lamichhane 5/8 (3 overs)

Nepal won by 140 runs (DLS method)
Bayuemas Oval, Pandamaran
Umpires: Tabarak Dar (HK) and Ian Thomson (HK)
Player of the match: Karan KC (Nep)

- Thailand won the toss and elected to field.

9 October 2018
10:00
Scorecard

Thailand; 79 (19.5 overs)	v	Singapore; 85/2 (10.3 overs)
Payuputh Sungnard 24 (27); Manpreet Singh 4/14 (4 overs)		Chaminda Ruwan 38* (26); Nopphon Senamontree 1/8 (2 overs)

Singapore won by 8 wickets
Bayuemas Oval, Pandamaran
Umpires: Durga Subedi (Nep) and Ian Thomson (HK)
Player of the match: Manpreet Singh (Sin)

- Thailand won the toss and elected to bat.

9 October 2018
10:00
Scorecard

Nepal; 150/4 (20 overs)	v	Bhutan; 33 (16.4 overs)
Pradeep Airee 75* (68); Thinley Jamtsho 1/10 (2 overs)		Tenzin Wangchuk 11 (19); Lalit Rajbanshi 3/4 (4 overs)

Nepal won by 117 runs
UKM Cricket Oval, Bangi
Umpires: Viswanadan Kalidas (Mas) and Sarika Prasad (Sin)
Player of the match: Pradeep Airee (Nep)

- Bhutan won the toss and elected to field.

9 October 2018
14:30
Scorecard

Myanmar; 9/8 (10.1 overs)	v	Malaysia; 11/2 (1.4 overs)
Ye Ko Ko Aung 3 (12); Pavandeep Singh 5/1 (4 overs)		Suhan Alagaratnam 7* (3); Paing Danu 2/2 (1 over)

Malaysia won by 8 wickets (D/L method)
Bayuemas Oval, Pandamaran
Umpires: Tabarak Dar (HK) and Durga Subedi (Nep)
Player of the match: Pavandeep Singh (Mas)

- Malaysia won the toss and elected to field.
- Malaysia were set a target of 6 runs from 8 overs due to rain.

10 October 2018
10:00
Scorecard

China; 26 (13 overs)	v	Nepal; 29/0 (1.5 overs)
Hong Jiang Yan 11 (27); Sandeep Lamichhane 3/4 (4 overs)		Binod Bhandari 24*(8)

Nepal won by 10 wickets
Bayuemas Oval, Pandamaran
Umpires: Viswanadan Kalidas (Mas) and Chettithody Shamshuddin (Ind)
Player of the match: Sandeep Lamichhane (Nep)

- Nepal won the toss and elected to field.

10 October 2018
10:00
Scorecard

Singapore; 161/9 (20 overs)	v	Bhutan; 66 (17 overs)
Surendran Chandramohan 80 (50); Tobden Singye 4/23 (4 overs)		Thinley Jamtsho 18 (31); Manpreet Singh 4/15 (4 overs)

Singapore won by 95 runs
UKM Cricket Oval, Bangi
Umpires: Tabarak Dar (HK) and Durga Subedi (Nep)
Player of the match: Surendran Chandramohan (Sin)

- Bhutan won the toss and elected to field.

10 October 2018
14:30
Scorecard

Thailand; 151/5 (20 overs)	v	Myanmar; 27/2 (8.4 overs)
Chanchai Pengkumta 50 (41); Khin Aye 2/33 (4 overs)		Khin Aye 10 (35); Nopphon Senamontree 1/7 (1.4 overs)

Thailand won by 31 runs (DLS method)
Bayuemas Oval, Pandamaran
Umpires: Viswanadan Kalidas (Mas) and Sarika Prasad (Sin)
Player of the match: Chanchai Pengkumta (Tha)

- Myanmar won the toss and elected to field.

12 October 2018
10:00
Scorecard

Bhutan; 105/8 (20 overs)	v	Myanmar; 66 (17 overs)
Kumar Subba 45 (59); Ko Ko Lin Thu 3/13 (4 overs)		Ko Ko Lin Thu 17 (24); Jigme Singye 3/6 (3 overs)

Bhutan won by 39 runs
Bayuemas Oval, Pandamaran
Umpires: Tabarak Dar (HK) and Ian Thomson (HK)
Player of the match: Jigme Singye (Bhu)

- Myanmar won the toss and elected to field.

12 October 2018
10:00
Scorecard

China; 30 (10 overs)	v	Malaysia; 31/0 (3 overs)
Chen Jinfeng 21 (27); Sivanantha Krishnan 3/0 (1 over)		Shafiq Sharif 19* (9)

Malaysia won by 10 wickets
UKM Cricket Oval, Bangi
Umpires: Durga Subedi (Nep) and Sarika Prasad (Sin)
Player of the match: Sivanantha Krishnan (Mas)

- Malaysia won the toss and elected to field.
- The match was reduced to 11 overs per side due to rain.

12 October 2018
14:30
Scorecard

Singapore; 81 (17.3 overs)	v	Nepal; 1/1 (0.3 overs)
Surendran Chandramohan 25 (32); Sandeep Lamichhane 4/16 (3.3 overs)		Shoaib Razzak 1/1 (0.3 overs)

No result
Bayuemas Oval, Pandamaran
Umpires: Tabarak Dar (HK) and Viswanadan Kalidas (Mas)

- Nepal won the toss and elected to field.

== Regional Finals ==
ICC T20 World Cup Asian Regional Finals Qualifier
- Dates: 22 – 28 July 2019
- Administrator: ICC Asia
- Cricket format: Twenty20 International
- Tournament format: Round-robin
- Host: Singapore
- Champions: Singapore
- Participants: 5
- Matches: 10
- Player of the series: (Kuwait) Muhammad Kashif
- Most runs: (Kuwait) Muhammad Kashif (143)
- Most wickets: (Qatar) Iqbal Hussain (12)

The Regional Finals were held in Singapore from 22 to 28 July 2019. The last match of the Finals, between Nepal and tournament hosts Singapore, saw the winner of the fixture, Singapore, qualify for the 2019 ICC T20 World Cup Qualifier. Kuwait's Muhammad Kashif was named the Player of the Series, after scoring 143 runs during the Finals.

Qualified Teams
Western sub-region	Qatar
Western sub-region	Kuwait
Eastern sub-region	Nepal
Eastern sub-region	Singapore
Eastern sub-region	Malaysia

=== Points table ===
Pos	Team	Pld	W	L	T	NR	Pts	NRR	
1	Singapore (H)	4	3	0	0	1	7	2.969	Qualified to 2019 T20 World Cup Qualifier
2	Qatar	4	2	2	0	0	4	−0.378	
3	Nepal	4	2	2	0	0	4	−0.682	
4	Kuwait	4	1	2	0	1	3	−1.179	
5	Malaysia	4	1	3	0	0	2	−0.390	

(H) Host

=== Fixtures ===
22 July 2019
10:00
Scorecard

Singapore; 186/7 (20 overs)	v	Qatar; 153/9 (20 overs)
Surendran Chandramohan 47 (39); Iqbal Hussain 4/33 (4 overs)		Tamoor Sajjad 34 (29); Janak Prakash 3/15 (4 overs)

Singapore won by 33 runs
Indian Association Ground, Singapore
Umpires: Viswanadan Kalidas (Mas) and Buddhi Pradhan (Nep)
Player of the match: Janak Prakash (Sin)

- Singapore won the toss and elected to bat.
- Vinoth Baskaran, Surendran Chandramohan, Tim David, Anantha Krishna, Amjad Mahboob, Anish Paraam, Janak Prakash, Rohan Rangarajan, Manpreet Singh, Chetan Suryawanshi and Selladore Vijayakumar (Sin) all made their T20I debuts.

22 July 2019
14:30
Scorecard

Malaysia; 162 (20 overs)	v	Kuwait; 120 (18 overs)
Shafiq Sharif 38 (27); Mohammad Ahsan 2/31 (3 overs)		Muhammad Kashif 51 (46); Muhamad Syahadat 3/33 (4 overs)

Malaysia won by 42 runs
Indian Association Ground, Singapore
Umpires: Tabarak Dar (HK) and Buddhi Pradhan (Nep)
Player of the match: Syed Aziz (Mas)

- Malaysia won the toss and elected to bat.
- Nawaf Ahmed (Kuw) made his T20I debut.

23 July 2019
10:00
Scorecard

Nepal; 122 (20 overs)	v	Qatar; 124/6 (19.2 overs)
Dipendra Singh Airee 34 (35); Iqbal Hussain 3/21 (4 overs)		Inam-ul-Haq 41 (32); Sandeep Lamichhane 3/33 (4 overs)

Qatar won by 4 wickets
Indian Association Ground, Singapore
Umpires: Tabarak Dar (HK) and Viswanadan Kalidas (Mas)
Player of the match: Inam-ul-Haq (Qat)

- Nepal won the toss and elected to bat.

23 July 2019
14:30
Scorecard

Singapore	v	Kuwait

Match abandoned
Indian Association Ground, Singapore
Umpires: Viswanadan Kalidas (Mas) and Buddhi Pradhan (Nep)

- No toss.
- No play was possible due to rain.

24 July 2019
10:00
Scorecard

Malaysia; 83/7 (9 overs)	v	Nepal; 86/3 (8 overs)
Syed Aziz 30 (15); Sompal Kami 3/23 (2 overs)		Gyanendra Malla 51 (21); Muhamad Syahadat 3/19 (2 overs)

Nepal won by 7 wickets
Indian Association Ground, Singapore
Umpires: Tabarak Dar (HK) and Viswanadan Kalidas (Mas)
Player of the match: Gyanendra Malla (Nep)

- Nepal won the toss and elected to field.
- The match was reduced to 9 overs per side due to rain.

26 July 2019
10:00
Scorecard

Kuwait; 197/7 (20 overs)	v	Qatar; 187/5 (20 overs)
Adnan Idrees 56 (32); Nouman Sarwar 2/36 (3 overs)		Tamoor Sajjad 46* (32); Jandu Hamoud 2/25 (3 overs)

Kuwait won by 10 runs
Indian Association Ground, Singapore
Umpires: Viswanadan Kalidas (Mas) and Buddhi Pradhan (Nep)
Player of the match: Adnan Idrees (Kuw)

- Qatar won the toss and elected to field.

26 July 2019
14:30
Scorecard

Malaysia; 92 (18.4 overs)	v	Singapore; 96/2 (13.2 overs)
Muhamad Syahadat 22 (20); Amjad Mahboob 3/20 (3.4 overs)		Surendran Chandramohan 50* (42); Neville Liyanage 1/19 (3 overs)

Singapore won by 8 wickets
Indian Association Ground, Singapore
Umpires: Tabarak Dar (HK) and Buddhi Pradhan (Nep)
Player of the match: Surendran Chandramohan (Sin)

- Malaysia won the toss and elected to bat.

27 July 2019
10:00
Scorecard

Kuwait; 141/9 (20 overs)	v	Nepal; 143/3 (15.5 overs)
Muhammad Kashif 49* (36); Basanta Regmi 3/20 (4 overs)		Paras Khadka 68 (42); Muhammad Kashif 3/30 (2.5 overs)

Nepal won by 7 wickets
Indian Association Ground, Singapore
Umpires: Tabarak Dar (HK) and Viswanadan Kalidas (Mas)
Player of the match: Paras Khadka (Nep)

- Nepal won the toss and elected to field.

27 July 2019
14:30
Scorecard

Malaysia; 144 (19.1 overs)	v	Qatar; 147/6 (19.4 overs)
Virandeep Singh 49 (46); Iqbal Hussain 3/23 (3.1 overs)		Nouman Sarwar 47* (37); Virandeep Singh 2/15 (1.4 overs)

Qatar won by 4 wickets
Indian Association Ground, Singapore
Umpires: Tabarak Dar (HK) and Buddhi Pradhan (Nep)
Player of the match: Nouman Sarwar (Qat)

- Malaysia won the toss and elected to bat.

28 July 2019
10:00
Scorecard

Singapore; 191/6 (20 overs)	v	Nepal; 109 (15 overs)
Tim David 77 (43); Abinash Bohara 4/35 (4 overs)		Gyanendra Malla 39 (21); Selladore Vijayakumar 4/25 (4 overs)

Singapore won by 82 runs
Indian Association Ground, Singapore
Umpires: Tabarak Dar (HK) and Viswanadan Kalidas (Mas)
Player of the match: Tim David (Sin)

- Singapore won the toss and elected to bat.
