= Neville Liyanage =

Sri Lankan cricketer (born 1975)

Personal information
- Born: 9 October 1975 (age 51); Matugama, Sri Lanka
- Batting: Right-handed
- Bowling: Left-arm medium-fast

International information
- National side: Malaysia
- T20I debut (cap 4): 24 June 2019 v Thailand
- Last T20I: 27 July 2019 v Qatar
- Source: Cricinfo, 23 April 2021

Neville Liyanage (born 9 October 1975) is a Sri Lankan cricketer who now plays for the Malaysian cricket team.

Liyanage is a right-handed batsman and a left-arm fast-medium bowler. He made his first-class cricket debut for Singha Sports Club on 29 December 2005. He made nearly 80 appearances in first-class and List A cricket in Sri Lanka between 2005 and 2011.

In June 2019, he was named in Malaysia's squad for the 2019 Malaysia Tri-Nation Series tournament. He made his Twenty20 International (T20I) debut for Malayasia, against Thailand, on 24 June 2019.
