= Ramesh Kalimuthu =

Personal information
- Full name: Ramesh Kalimuthu
- Born: 16 May 1987 (age 39); Keelkudi, Ramanathapuram district, Tamil Nadu, India
- Batting: Right-handed
- Bowling: Right-arm medium-fast
- Role: Bowler

International information
- National side: Singapore (2023–2025)
- T20I debut: 30 October 2023 v Nepal
- Last T20I: 28 February 2025 v Bahrain

Career statistics
Competition	T20I	List A
Matches	15	4
Runs scored	27	13
Batting average	13.50	6.50
100s/50s	0/0	0/0
Top score	16*	13*
Balls bowled	313	90
Wickets	25	1
Bowling average	17.24	66.00
5 wickets in innings	1	0
10 wickets in match	0	0
Best bowling	5/21	1/24
Catches/stumpings	1/–	0/–
- Source: ESPNcricinfo, 20 July 2026

Ramesh Kalimuthu (born 16 May 1987) is an Indian-born cricketer. A right-handed batter and right-arm medium-fast bowler, he has represented the Singapore national cricket team in Twenty20 International and List A.

== Early life and career ==
Kalimuthu was born in Keelkudi in Ramanathapuram district, Tamil Nadu. He played cricket as a teenager and later played village and district cricket in India before moving to Singapore in 2011 to work in construction.

By 2022, Kalimuthu was playing in the Singapore Cricket Association Premier League for Millennium United Cricket Club, and also the migrant workers' Tamil Thalaivas side. He was named the Most Valuable Player of the Westlite Integration Cup in 2022. He has also played for Golden Cricket Club.

In 2023, Kalimuthu qualified to represent Singapore under ICC residency rules and made his T20I debut against Nepal at Kirtipur on 30 October. During a 2024 ICC Men's T20 World Cup Asia Qualifier A match, he took 5 wickets for 21 runs against Kuwait at Bangi and was named player of the match.

In July 2026, Kalimuthu was selected by the Trichy Grand Cholas for the 10th edition of the Tamil Nadu Premier League.
