= List of Maldives Twenty20 International cricketers =

This is a list of Maldivian Twenty20 International cricketers.

In April 2018, the ICC decided to grant full Twenty20 International (T20I) status to all its members. Therefore, all Twenty20 matches played between Maldives and other ICC members since 1 January 2019 have the full T20I status.

This list comprises all members of the Maldives cricket team who have played at least one T20I match. It is initially arranged in the order in which each player won his first Twenty20 cap. Where more than one player won his first Twenty20 cap in the same match, their surnames are listed alphabetically.

== Key ==
General

- ‡ – Captain
- † – Wicket-keeper
- First – Year of debut
- Last – Year of latest game
- Mat – Number of matches played

Batting

- Runs – Runs scored in career
- HS – Highest score
- Avg – Runs scored per dismissal
- * – Batsman remained not out
- 50 – Half-centuries scored

Bowling

- Balls – Balls bowled in career
- Wkt – Wickets taken in career
- BBI – Best bowling in an innings
- Ave – Average runs per wicket

Fielding

- Ca – Catches taken
- St – Stumpings affected

== List of players ==
Statistics are correct as of 14 October 2026.

Maldives T20I cricketers
General					Batting				Bowling				Fielding		Ref
No.	Name	First	Last	Mat	Runs	HS	Avg	50	Balls	Wkt	BBI	Ave	Ca	St	Ref
1	Ahmed Hassan	2019	2022	21	338	53	17.78	1	123	6	2/22	25.16	4	0	
2	Ameel Mauroof	2019	2026	33	131	19*	10.91	0	418	18	2/12	31.61	4	0	
3	Hassan Rasheed‡†	2019	2026	37	303	34	11.22	0	–	–	–	–	8	1	
4	Ibrahim Hassan	2019	2024	48	217	20*	8.03	0	867	43	5/24	25.81	17	0	
5	Ibrahim Nashath	2019	2024	22	90	20*	7.50	0	186	8	2/15	28.37	8	0	
6	Mohamed Azzam‡†	2020	2024	43	314	25	9.23	0	–	–	–	–	23	7	
7	Mohamed Rishwan †	2019	2026	41	641	67	17.80	3	12	0	–	–	15	1	
8	Mohamed Mahfooz‡	2019	2021	15	65	16	9.28	0	293	13	2/14	26.15	0	0	
9	Muaviath Ganee	2019	2023	7	78	36	15.60	0	–	–	–	–	0	0	
10	Shafee Saeed	2019	2019	5	2	2	2.00	0	66	1	1/24	95.00	2	0	
11	Umar Adam‡	2019	2026	51	810	56	17.23	4	974	56	3/11	22.62	17	0	
12	Ibrahim Rizan	2019	2026	47	113	11*	5.94	0	693	33	3/6	25.12	25	0	
13	Mihusan Hamid	2019	2019	1	–	–	–	–	18	0	–	–	0	0	
14	Nilantha Cooray	2019	2020	7	170	56*	34.00	1	146	8	3/26	21.75	0	0	
15	Chandana Liyanage	2019	2023	4	0	0*	0.00	0	30	1	1/33	47.00	0	0	
16	Shafraz Jaleel†	2019	2026	7	17	17	3.40	0	–	–	–	–	5	2	
17	Wedage Malinda	2019	2023	11	24	10*	4.80	0	54	1	1/27	66.00	10	0	
18	Ali Ivan	2019	2019	1	11	11	11.00	0	–	–	–	–	0	0	
19	Nazwan Ismail	2019	2026	16	14	5*	4.66	0	164	9	3/17	29.11	4	0	
20	Leem Shafeeg	2019	2024	25	48	19*	8.00	0	377	20	3/9	25.40	2	0	
21	Azyan Farhath‡	2019	2026	40	891	66*	28.74	6	325	24	4/5	16.12	8	0	
22	Ihala Kumara	2020	2020	3	11	5	3.66	0	30	2	2/32	22.50	3	0	
23	Ahmed Raid	2020	2020	1	–	–	–	–	12	0	–	–	0	0	
24	Shunan Ali	2022	2024	10	14	11*	–	0	156	10	4/24	17.20	1	0	
25	Abdullah Shahid	2022	2022	3	45	34	15.00	0	6	0	–	–	1	0	
26	Ismail Ali	2023	2026	23	243	37	12.78	0	36	0	–	–	3	0	
27	Mohamed Miuvaan	2023	2024	4	0	0	0.00	0	66	1	1/42	83.00	3	0	
28	Naseer Naail Ismail	2023	2023	2	0	0	0.00	1	36	1	1/23	31.00	0	0	
29	Azin Rafeeg	2023	2024	3	26	24*	26.00	0	42	3	3/10	15.00	0	0	
30	Rasheed Rassam	2023	2024	3	12	12*	–	0	18	0	–	–	0	0	
31	Tholal Mohamed Raya	2023	2023	2	0	0	0.00	0	30	2	2/7	6.33	0	0	
32	Hussain Saadhin	2023	2023	2	3	3	3.00	0	12	1	1/4	24.00	1	0	
33	Fareed Shius	2023	2023	2	10	10	10.00	0	–	–	–	–	1	0	
34	Savindra Amaradasa	2023	2023	1	–	–	–	–	12	0	–	–	0	0	
35	Kaushal Rodrigo	2023	2024	13	223	71	18.58	1	–	–	–	–	2	0	
36	Shaof Hassan	2023	2024	12	132	36*	16.50	0	–	–	–	–	1	0	
37	Mohamed Ishmath	2024	2024	8	0	0	0.00	0	156	5	2/20	37.60	1	0	
38	Adam Khalaf	2024	2024	1	–	–	–	–	–	–	–	–	0	0	
39	Mohamed Shiyam	2024	2024	5	37	25*	18.50	0	24	1	1/22	63.00	3	0	
40	Gedara Wijesingha	2024	2024	6	102	56	20.40	1	–	–	–	–	1	0	
41	Mabsar Abdulla	2024	2024	2	11	11	11.00	0	–	–	–	–	1	0	
42	Ashan Yapa	2026	2026	5	39	16	19.50	0	–	–	–	–	0	0	
43	Harsha Amarasinghe	2026	2026	5	9	8	4.50	0	90	4	2/37	43.75	2	0	
44	Tharusha Kavinda	2026	2026	2	–	–	–	–	12	2	2/11	5.50	0	0	
45	Sheraz Iqbal	2026	2026	5	95	47	31.66	0	48	4	2/24	10.25	1	0	
