= Muhamad Syahadat =

Malaysian cricketer (born 1994)

Personal information
- Full name: Muhammad Syahadat Ramli
- Born: 24 March 1994 (age 32); Keluang Johor, Malaysia

International information
- National side: Malaysia
- T20I debut (cap 5): 24 June 2019 v Thailand
- Last T20I: 9 July 2022 v Maldives
Medal record
Representing Malaysia
Men's Cricket
Southeast Asian Games
Gold medal – first place	2017 Kuala Lumpur	50 over
Silver medal – second place	2017 Kuala Lumpur	Twenty20
Silver medal – second place	2023 Phnom Penh	50 over
- Source: Cricinfo, 9 July 2022

Muhamad Syahadat Ramli (born 24 March 1994) is a Malaysian cricketer, who plays for the national cricket team. In April 2018, he was named in Malaysia's squad for the 2018 ICC World Cricket League Division Four tournament also in Malaysia. He played in Malaysia's opening fixture of the tournament, against Uganda, and was named the man of the match after taking four wickets.

He was named the vice-captain of Malaysia's squad for the 2018 Asia Cup Qualifier tournament. In October 2018, he was named in Malaysia's squad in the Eastern sub-region group for the 2018–19 ICC World Twenty20 Asia Qualifier tournament.

In June 2019, he was named in Malaysia's squad for the 2019 Malaysia Tri-Nation Series tournament. He made his Twenty20 International (T20I) debut for Malayasia, against Thailand, on 24 June 2019. In September 2019, he was named in Malaysia's squad for the 2019 Malaysia Cricket World Cup Challenge League A tournament. He made his List A debut for Malaysia, against Denmark, in the Cricket World Cup Challenge League A tournament on 16 September 2019.
