= Fitri Sham =

Malaysian cricketer (born 1994)

Personal information
- Full name: Mohd Fitri Bin Mohd Sham
- Born: 26 February 1994 (age 32)
- Batting: Left-handed
- Bowling: Slow left-arm orthodox

International information
- National side: Malaysia
- T20I debut (cap 3): 24 June 2019 v Thailand
- Last T20I: 31 October 2023 v Nepal
Medal record
Representing Malaysia
Men's Cricket
Southeast Asian Games
Silver medal – second place	2017 Kuala Lumpur	Twenty20
Silver medal – second place	2023 Phnom Penh	50 over
- Source: ESPN Cricinfo, 31 October 2023

Fitri Sham (born 26 February 1994) is a Malaysian cricketer who plays for the Malaysia national cricket team. He made his Twenty20 International (T20I) debut against Thailand on 24 June 2019 in the 2019 Malaysia Tri-Nation Series. He was a member of Malaysia's squad for the Regional Finals of the 2018–19 ICC T20 World Cup Asia Qualifier tournament.
