= Sharvin Muniandy =

Malaysian cricketer (born 1995)

Personal information
- Born: 15 October 1995 (age 31)

International information
- National side: Malaysia
- T20I debut (cap 6): 24 June 2019 v Thailand
- Last T20I: 31 October 2023 v Nepal
- Source: Cricinfo, 16 March 2023

Sharvin Muniandy (born 15 October 1995) is a Malaysian cricketer who plays for the Malaysia national cricket team. He made his Twenty20 International (T20I) debut against Thailand on 24 June 2019 in the 2019 Malaysia Tri-Nation Series. He played in Malaysia's squad for the Regional Finals of the 2018–19 ICC T20 World Cup Asia Qualifier tournament.

He was in Malaysia's squad for the 2022 Canada Cricket World Cup Challenge League A tournament. He made his List A debut on 28 July 2022, for Malaysia against Vanuatu.
