= Ahmad Faiz =

Malaysian cricketer

Personal information
- Full name: Ahmad Faiz Mohamad Noor
- Born: 12 February 1988 (age 38); Malaysia
- Batting: Right-handed
- Role: Batsman

International information
- National side: Malaysia
- T20I debut (cap 1): 24 June 2019 v Thailand
- Last T20I: 31 October 2023 v Nepal
Medal record
Representing Malaysia
Men's Cricket
Southeast Asian Games
Gold medal – first place	2017 Kuala Lumpur	50 over
Silver medal – second place	2017 Kuala Lumpur	Twenty20
Silver medal – second place	2023 Phnom Penh	50 over
- Source: ESPNCricinfo, 16 March 2023

Ahmad Faiz (born 12 February 1988) is a Malaysian cricketer who plays for the Malaysia national cricket team. He was part of Malaysia's squad for the 2008 Under-19 Cricket World Cup. He played in the 2014 ICC World Cricket League Division Three tournament.

He was a member of the Malaysian team which won the gold medal in the men's 50-over tournament after defeating Singapore by 251 runs in the final at the 2017 Southeast Asian Games.

He was in Malaysia's squad for the 2018 ICC World Cricket League Division Four tournament, also in Malaysia. He finished as the leading run-scorer for the tournament, with 298 runs in six matches.

In August 2018, he was named the captain of Malaysia's squad for the 2018 Asia Cup Qualifier tournament. In October 2018, he was named the captain of Malaysia's squad in the Eastern sub-region group for the 2018–19 ICC World Twenty20 Asia Qualifier tournament.

In June 2019, he was named in Malaysia's squad for the 2019 Malaysia Tri-Nation Series tournament. He made his Twenty20 International (T20I) debut for Malayasia, against Thailand, on 24 June 2019. The following month, he was named as the captain of Malaysia's squad for the Regional Finals of the 2018–19 ICC T20 World Cup Asia Qualifier tournament. He made his List A debut for Malaysia, against Denmark, in the 2019 Malaysia Cricket World Cup Challenge League A tournament on 16 September 2019.
