= List of Malaysia Twenty20 International cricketers =

This is a list of Malaysian Twenty20 International cricketers.

In April 2018, the ICC decided to grant full Twenty20 International (T20I) status to all its members. Therefore, all Twenty20 matches played between Malaysia and other ICC members after 1 January 2019 have the full T20I status.

This list comprises all members of the Malaysia cricket team who have played at least one T20I match. It is initially arranged in the order in which each player won his first Twenty20 cap. Where more than one player won his first Twenty20 cap in the same match, those players are listed alphabetically by surname. Malaysia played their first match with T20I status on 24 June against Thailand.

== Key ==
General

- ‡ – Captain
- † – Wicket-keeper
- First – Year of debut
- Last – Year of latest game
- Mat – Number of matches played

Batting

- Runs – Runs scored in career
- HS – Highest score
- Avg – Runs scored per dismissal
- * – Batsman remained not out
- 50 – Half-centuries scored
- 100 – Centuries scored

Bowling

- Balls – Balls bowled in career
- Wkt – Wickets taken in career
- BBI – Best bowling in an innings
- Ave – Average runs per wicket

Fielding

- Ca – Catches taken
- St – Stumpings affected

== List of players ==
Statistics are correct as of 14 October 2026.

Malaysia T20I cricketers
General					Batting					Bowling				Fielding		Ref
No.	Name	First	Last	Mat	Runs	HS	Avg	50	100	Balls	Wkt	BBI	Ave	Ca	St	Ref
1	Ahmad Faiz‡	2019	2026	106	1,952	105*	24.40	8	1	55	3	2/8	17.33	29	0	
2	Anwar Arudin	2019	2021	21	211	32	10.04	0	0	–	–	–	–	3	0	
3	Fitri Sham	2019	2024	45	164	40*	10.25	0	0	878	48	3/22	20.33	8	0	
4	Neville Liyanage	2019	2019	6	8	8	4.00	0	0	84	3	1/19	33.33	1	0	
5	Muhamad Syahadat	2019	2026	64	738	55*	22.36	1	0	149	13	3/7	11.23	17	0	
6	Sharvin Muniandy	2019	2026	130	1,216	60*	16.88	1	0	935	55	4/13	23.45	80	0	
7	Nazril Rahman	2019	2022	13	67	24*	11.16	0	0	114	4	2/28	46.50	6	0	
8	Aminuddin Ramly	2019	2021	23	280	41	16.47	0	0	–	–	–	–	6	0	
9	Shafiq Sharif†	2019	2021	13	243	53	20.25	1	0	–	–	–	–	2	3	
10	Syed Aziz‡†	2019	2026	137	3,291	126	30.19	25	1	1,605	86	4/8	22.80	37	7	
11	Virandeep Singh‡†	2019	2026	131	3,644	116*	37.18	26	1	2,109	141	5/14	13.24	58	4	
12	Anwar Rahman	2019	2023	22	22	12	3.66	0	0	370	25	4/16	14.92	7	0	
13	Pasha Syafiq Ali	2019	2019	2	–	–	–	–	–	–	–	–	–	1	0	
14	Pavandeep Singh	2019	2026	99	36	12*	18.00	0	0	2,207	120	4/3	18.25	21	0	
15	Ainool Haqqiem†	2019	2019	4	20	12	20.00	0	0	–	–	–	–	1	2	
16	Mohamed Arief	2019	2023	20	257	52*	19.76	1	0	12	0	–	–	7	0	
17	Muhammad Wafiq	2019	2026	44	67	16*	6.09	0	0	727	31	3/10	30.83	3	0	
18	Zubaidi Zulkifle	2019	2026	71	1,269	96	18.94	4	0	–	–	–	–	34	0	
19	Ainool Hafizs†	2019	2026	67	193	21	7.42	0	0	–	–	–	–	29	14	
20	Syazrul Idrus	2019	2023	33	78	13*	8.66	0	0	586	51	7/8	13.45	9	0	
21	Muhammad Amir	2019	2026	75	707	80	15.04	2	0	698	49	5/16	15.30	31	0	
22	Khizar Hayat	2020	2025	58	262	28	13.10	0	0	1,022	47	5/4	23.55	14	0	
23	Bhushan Save	2020	2020	2	16	9	8.00	0	0	–	–	–	–	2	0	
24	Dhivendran Mogan	2020	2021	3	2	2	2.00	0	0	72	1	1/31	116.00	0	0	
25	Ammar Zuhdi Hazalan†	2022	2022	3	0	0	0.00	0	0	–	–	–	–	2	1	
26	Vijay Unni	2022	2026	89	381	38	14.65	0	0	1,679	95	4/6	18.26	20	0	
27	Rizwan Haider	2022	2026	37	36	17*	18.00	0	0	608	36	4/34	20.72	4	0	
28	Syed Rehmatullah†	2022	2022	7	1	1*	–	0	0	–	–	–	–	2	0	
29	Aslam Khan	2022	2026	38	510	77	16.45	1	0	–	–	–	–	11	0	
30	Wan Azam†	2023	2023	1	–	–	–	–	–	–	–	–	–	0	0	
31	Sharveen Surendran	2023	2023	2	27	23	27.00	0	0	–	–	–	–	0	0	
32	Connor Smith (Note: Connor Smith also played T20I cricket for the Isle of Man. Only his records for Malaysia are given above.)	2023	2023	2	10	9	5.00	0	0	10	1	1/15	15.00	1	0	
33	Aqeel Wahid	2024	2026	43	637	65*	31.85	1	0	174	5	2/25	37.80	8	0	
34	Nazmus Sakib†	2024	2026	12	160	37	17.77	0	0	–	–	–	–	7	6	
35	Rajkumar Rajendran	2024	2024	3	10	8	5.00	0	0	–	–	–	–	0	0	
36	Saif Ullah Malik	2024	2024	1	2	2	2.00	0	0	–	–	–	–	1	0	
37	Azri Azhar	2024	2026	15	201	13	5.25	0	0	178	7	2/12	31.14	4	0	
38	Amir Khan	2025	2026	15	133	38	19.00	0	0	32	3	3/17	9.33	6	0	
39	Arif Ullah	2025	2026	8	5	5*	–	0	0	153	9	4/10	22.11	1	0	
40	Muhammad Haziq Aiman†	2025	2026	25	457	113	19.86	0	1	–	–	–	–	6	5	
41	Rahim Khan	2025	2026	7	3	3*	–	0	0	132	4	3/16	31.25	3	0	
42	Prashant Madhukar	2026	2026	9	3	3*	3.00	0	0	145	6	2/15	26.00	5	0	
43	Muhammad Akram	2026	2026	10	37	15	9.25	0	0	60	0	–	–	2	0	
44	Adeshlie Alias†	2026	2026	2	29	22	14.50	0	0	–	–	–	–	3	0	
