= Bayuemas Oval =

Cricket stadium in Pandamaran, Klang, Malaysia

Coordinates: 2°58′41″N 101°26′16″E

- Interactive map of Bayuemas Oval

Ground information
- Location: Pandamaran, Klang, Malaysia
- Country: Malaysia
- Establishment: 2004
- Capacity: 3000
- Owner: Malaysian Cricket Association
- Operator: n/a
- Tenants: Malaysia cricket team Malaysia women's national cricket team
- End names
- Sime Darby End; Golden Hope End

International information
- Only men's ODI: 1 May 2014: Afghanistan v Hong Kong
- First men's T20I: 26 July 2023: Malaysia v China
- Last men's T20I: 9 September 2024: Myanmar v Singapore
- First women's T20I: 22 August 2023: Malaysia v Kuwait
- Last women's T20I: 18 February 2024: Malaysia v United Arab Emirates
- As of 9 September 2024; Source: Cricinfo

Bayuemas Oval is a cricket stadium located in Pandamaran, Klang, Malaysia. The first recorded match on this ground was held in 2004.

The ground is designed and constructed by the New Zealand Sports Turf Institute. It features like saucer for excellent drainage system. It also hosted matches during 2011 ICC World Cricket League Division Six, 2012 ICC World Cricket League Division Four and 2014 ICC World Cricket League Division Five.

Bayuemas Oval hosted its first One Day International cricket match between Afghanistan and Hong Kong in ACC Premier League in 2014 where Afghanistan won by 6 wickets. Nearly a decade later, the ground was selected as the venue for twelve ODI matches of the 2026 ACC Men's Premier Cup. In September 2026, the ground was selected to host the three-match Twenty20 International (T20I) series played as part of the United Arab Emirates' tour of Malaysia.
