= Pavandeep Singh =

Malaysian cricketer

Personal information
- Full name: Pavandeep Singh Jagjit Singh
- Born: 17 January 1998 (age 28)
- Batting: Right-handed
- Bowling: Slow left-arm orthodox
- Relatives: Virandeep Singh (brother)

International information
- National side: Malaysia
- T20I debut (cap 14): 13 July 2019 v Nepal
- Last T20I: 31 October 2023 v Nepal
Medal record
Representing Malaysia
Men's Cricket
Southeast Asian Games
Gold medal – first place	2017 Kuala Lumpur	50 over
Silver medal – second place	2023 Phnom Penh	50 over
- Source: Cricinfo, 25 December 2022

Pavandeep Singh (born 17 January 1998) is a Malaysian cricketer. He played in the 2014 ICC World Cricket League Division Three tournament. He was in Malaysia's squad for the 2018 ICC World Cricket League Division Four tournament, also in Malaysia. He was the leading wicket-taker for Malaysia in the tournament, with nine dismissals in five matches.

He was a member of Malaysia's squad for the 2018 Asia Cup Qualifier tournament. In October 2018, he was named in Malaysia's squad in the Eastern sub-region group for the 2018–19 ICC World Twenty20 Asia Qualifier tournament. On 9 October 2018, in the rain-affected match against Myanmar, he took five wickets for one run, with Myanmar finishing 9/8 from 10.1 overs.

In July 2019, he was named in Malaysia's Twenty20 International (T20I) squad for their series against Nepal. He made his T20I debut for Malaysia against Nepal on 13 July 2019. In September 2019, he was named in Malaysia's squad for the 2019 Malaysia Cricket World Cup Challenge League A tournament. He made his List A debut for Malaysia, against Denmark, in the Cricket World Cup Challenge League A tournament on 16 September 2019.
