= Virandeep Singh =

Malaysian cricketer

Personal information
- Full name: Virandeep Singh Jagjit Singh
- Born: 23 March 1999 (age 27)
- Batting: Right-handed
- Bowling: Slow left-arm orthodox
- Relatives: Pavandeep Singh (brother)

International information
- National side: Malaysia
- T20I debut (cap 11): 24 June 2019 v Thailand
- Last T20I: 12 October 2026 v Singapore

Domestic team information
- Years: Team
- 2026: Galle Gallants
Medal record
Representing Malaysia
Men's Cricket
Southeast Asian Games
Gold medal – first place	2017 Kuala Lumpur	50 over
Silver medal – second place	2017 Kuala Lumpur	Twenty20
Silver medal – second place	2023 Phnom Penh	50 over
- Source: Cricinfo, 31 October 2023

Virandeep Singh (born 23 March 1999) is a Malaysian cricketer who currently plays for Malaysia cricket team and former captain of the Malaysia cricket team. His elder brother, Pavandeep Singh, is also a Malaysian cricketer.

== Career ==
He played for Malaysia in the 2017 ICC World Cricket League Division Three tournament in May 2017. Prior to the Division 3 tournament, he was captain of the national side for the 2016 Under-19 Asia Cup. In April 2018, he was named in Malaysia's squad for the 2018 ICC World Cricket League Division Four tournament, held in Malaysia.

He was in Malaysia's squad for the 2018 Asia Cup Qualifier tournament, and was the leading run-scorer for Malaysia in the tournament, with 165 runs in five matches. In October 2018, he was named in Malaysia's squad in the Eastern sub-region group for the 2018–19 ICC World Twenty20 Asia Qualifier tournament.

In June 2019, he was named in Malaysia's squad for the 2019 Malaysia Tri-Nation Series tournament. He made his Twenty20 International (T20I) debut for Malaysia, against Thailand, on 24 June 2019. He made his List A debut for Malaysia, against Denmark, in the 2019 Malaysia Cricket World Cup Challenge League A tournament on 16 September 2019. He finished the tournament as the leading run-scorer for Malaysia, with 181 runs in five matches.

In September 2019, he was named as the captain of Malaysia's squad for their series against Vanuatu. In the opening match of the tour, at the age of 20 years and 190 days, Singh became the youngest male cricketer to captain a side in a T20I match.
