= Syed Aziz =

Malaysian cricketer (born 1998)

Personal information
- Born: 7 October 1998 (age 28)
- Role: Batsman

International information
- National side: Malaysia
- T20I debut (cap 10): 24 June 2019 v Thailand
- Last T20I: 31 October 2023 v Nepal
Medal record
Representing Malaysia
Men's Cricket
Southeast Asian Games
Silver medal – second place	2017 Kuala Lumpur	Twenty20
- Source: ESPNCricinfo, 4 May 2023

Syed Aziz (born 7 October 1998) is a Malaysian cricketer. He played for Malaysia in the 2017 ICC World Cricket League Division Three tournament in May 2017. In April 2018, he was named in Malaysia's squad for the 2018 ICC World Cricket League Division Four tournament, which was held in Malaysia.

In August 2018, he was named in Malaysia's squad for the 2018 Asia Cup Qualifier tournament. In October 2018, he was named in Malaysia's squad in the Eastern sub-region group for the 2018–19 ICC World Twenty20 Asia Qualifier tournament.

In December 2018, he was one of two Malaysian cricketers signed to play a four-month stint of first-class cricket in Sri Lanka. He made his first-class debut for Sri Lanka Police SC in Tier B of the 2018–19 Premier League Tournament on 11 February 2019.

In June 2019, he was named in Malaysia's squad for the 2019 Malaysia Tri-Nation Series tournament. He made his Twenty20 International (T20I) debut, against Thailand, on 24 June 2019. In September 2019, he was named in Malaysia's squad for the 2019 Malaysia Cricket World Cup Challenge League A tournament. He made his List A debut for Malaysia, against Denmark, in the Cricket World Cup Challenge League A tournament on 16 September 2019.

He was in Malaysia's squad for the 2022 Canada Cricket World Cup Challenge League A tournament. On 28 July 2022, in Malaysia's match against Vanuatu, he took his first five-wicket haul in List A cricket.
