= Viswanadan Kalidas =

Malaysian cricket umpire

Personal information
- Born: 12 February 1972 (age 54); Ipoh, Perak, Malaysia
- Role: Umpire

Umpiring information
- T20Is umpired: 107 (2019–2025)
- WODIs umpired: 11 (2022–2023)
- WT20Is umpired: 58 (2018–2025)
- LA umpired: 25
- Source: ESPNcricinfo, 5 July 2026

Viswanadan Kalidas (born 12 February 1972) is a Malaysian cricket umpire. He is a member of the Development Panel of ICC Umpires, and was the first Malaysian umpire to be appointed to the ICC Development Panel.

His men's Twenty20 International (T20I) umpiring debut, on 22 March 2019, was in a match between Papua New Guinea and the Philippines, in the Regional Finals of the 2018–19 ICC T20 World Cup East Asia-Pacific Qualifier tournament. Kalidas has also officiated in five women's ODI and 41 women's T20I matches.

== See also ==
- List of Twenty20 International cricket umpires
