= 2023 Men's Gulf T20I Championship =

International cricket tournament

- Dates: 15 – 23 September 2023
- Administrator: Qatar Cricket Association
- Cricket format: Twenty20 International
- Tournament format(s): Round-robin and final
- Host: Qatar
- Champions: Oman (1st title)
- Runners-up: United Arab Emirates
- Participants: 6
- Matches: 16
- Player of the series: (United Arab Emirates) Muhammad Waseem
- Most runs: (United Arab Emirates) Muhammad Waseem (316)
- Most wickets: (United Arab Emirates) Ali Naseer (11)

The 2023 Men's Gulf T20I Championship was a Twenty20 International (T20I) cricket tournament that took place in Qatar in September 2023. The participating teams in the inaugural edition of the Gulf Championship were the hosts Qatar along with Bahrain, Kuwait, Oman, Saudi Arabia and United Arab Emirates. All of the matches were played at the West End Park International Cricket Stadium in Doha. The top two sides in the round-robin advanced to the final.

Oman defeated United Arab Emirates in the final by 5 wickets to win the championship.

A few days after the final, the same venue hosted the T20 World Cup Asia Qualifier A tournament, which featured Kuwait, Qatar and Saudi Arabia as well as Maldives.

== Squads ==
Bahrain	Kuwait	Oman	Qatar	Saudi Arabia	United Arab Emirates
Umer Toor (c, wk); Abdul Majid; Fiaz Ahmed; Sohail Ahmed; Imran Ali (wk); Imran Anwar; Junaid Aziz; Ahmer Bin Nisar (wk); Haider Butt; Rizwan Butt; Ali Dawood; Yasser Nazir; Sathaiya Veerapathiran; Yousif Wali; Mohsin Zaki	Mohammed Aslam (c); Shiraz Khan (vc); Clinto Anto; Meet Bhavsar (wk); Adnan Idrees; Parvindar Kumar; Sayed Monib; Usman Patel (wk); Yasin Patel; Shahrukh Quddus; Ravija Sandaruwan; Mohamed Shafeeq; Ahsan ul Haq; Ali Zaheer	Aqib Ilyas (c); Ayaan Khan (vc); Shakeel Ahmed; Fayyaz Butt; Kaleemullah; Bilal Khan; Mehran Khan; Shoaib Khan; Naseem Khushi (wk); Rafiullah; Mohammad Nadeem; Jay Odedra; Kashyap Prajapati; Jatinder Singh	Muhammad Murad (c); Yousuf Ali; Uzair Amir (wk); Saqlain Arshad; Mirza Mohammed Baig; Amir Farooq; Bukhar Illikkal; Mohammed Irshad; Muhammad Jabir; Jassim Khan; Bipin Kumar; Imal Liyanage (wk); Adnan Mirza; Himanshu Rathod; Muhammad Tanveer	Hisham Sheikh (c); Abdullah Abbas; Ishtiaq Ahmad; Manan Ali; Atif-Ur-Rehman; Ahmed Baladraf; Sarfraz Butt (wk); Haseeb Ghafoor (wk); Faisal Khan; Saad Khan; Khalander Mustafa; Usman Najeeb; Mohsin Shabbir; Umair Sharif; Zain Ul Abidin; Abdul Waheed	Muhammad Waseem (c); Vriitya Aravind (wk); Basil Hameed; Mohammed Faraazuddin; Muhammad Jawadullah; Nilansh Keswani; Aayan Afzal Khan; Asif Khan; Zahoor Khan; Ali Naseer; Akif Raja; Aryansh Sharma (wk); Sanchit Sharma; Junaid Siddique; Ansh Tandon

== Round-robin ==
=== Points table ===
Pos	Team	Pld	W	L	NR	Pts	NRR	Qualification
1	United Arab Emirates	5	4	1	0	8	1.592	Advanced to the final
2	Oman	5	3	2	0	6	1.110	Advanced to the final
3	Qatar	5	3	2	0	6	−0.503	
4	Bahrain	5	3	2	0	6	−0.518	
5	Kuwait	5	2	3	0	4	−0.391	
6	Saudi Arabia	5	0	5	0	0	−1.292	

Source: ESPNcricinfo

=== Fixtures ===
15 September 2023
16:00 (D/N)
Scorecard

Saudi Arabia; 142/9 (20 overs)	v	Kuwait; 143/5 (18.3 overs)
Faisal Khan 62 (42); Adnan Idrees 2/17 (3 overs)		Ravija Sandaruwan 58 (41); Hisham Sheikh 1/28 (3 overs)

Kuwait won by 5 wickets
West End Park International Cricket Stadium, Doha
Umpires: Azad KR (Oma) and Mohammad Nasim (Qat)
Player of the match: Adnan Idrees (Kuw)

- Saudi Arabia won the toss and elected to bat.
- Parvindar Kumar, Ahsan ul Haq (Kuw), Manan Ali and Mohsin Shabbir (Sau) all made their T20I debuts.

15 September 2023
20:30 (N)
Scorecard

Qatar; 138/8 (20 overs)	v	Bahrain; 104/7 (17 overs)
Muhammad Tanveer 40* (31); Abdul Majid 2/11 (4 overs)		Imran Anwar 37 (27); Muhammad Jabir 2/26 (4 overs)

Qatar won by 19 runs (DLS method)
West End Park International Cricket Stadium, Doha
Umpires: Imran Mustafa (Kuw) and Shiju Sam (UAE)
Player of the match: Himanshu Rathod (Qat)

- Bahrain won the toss and elected to field.
- Bahrain were set a revised target of 124 runs in 17 overs due to a floodlight failure.
- Uzair Amir, Mirza Mohammed Baig, Bukhar Illikkal, Muhammad Jabir, Bipin Kumar, Adnan Mirza, Himanshu Rathod (Qat) and Mohsin Zaki (Bhr) all made their T20I debuts.

16 September 2023
16:00 (D/N)
Scorecard

United Arab Emirates; 191/4 (20 overs)	v	Oman; 169/7 (20 overs)
Muhammad Waseem 80 (38); Mehran Khan 1/19 (2 overs)		Aqib Ilyas 90 (52); Ali Naseer 3/31 (4 overs)

United Arab Emirates won by 22 runs
West End Park International Cricket Stadium, Doha
Umpires: Rahat Ali (Sau) and Imran Mustafa (Kuw)
Player of the match: Muhammad Waseem (UAE)

- Oman won the toss and elected to field.
- Shakeel Ahmed (Oma) made his T20I debut.

16 September 2023
20:30 (N)
Scorecard

Bahrain; 123/9 (20 overs)	v	Kuwait; 127/2 (13.5 overs)
Rizwan Butt 34* (13); Shiraz Khan 3/12 (4 overs)		Meet Bhavsar 76* (49); Ali Dawood 2/22 (3 overs)

Kuwait won by 8 wickets
West End Park International Cricket Stadium, Doha
Umpires: Mohammad Nasim (Qat) and Shiju Sam (UAE)
Player of the match: Meet Bhavsar (Kuw)

- Kuwait won the toss and elected to field.

17 September 2023
16:00 (D/N)
Scorecard

Oman; 149 (20 overs)	v	Qatar; 130/7 (20 overs)
Mohammad Nadeem 36 (41); Muhammad Jabir 4/37 (4 overs)		Saqlain Arshad 31 (37); Mehran Khan 3/17 (4 overs)

Oman won by 19 runs
West End Park International Cricket Stadium, Doha
Umpires: Shiju Sam (UAE) and Mohammed Younis (Bhr)
Player of the match: Mehran Khan (Oma)

- Oman won the toss and elected to bat.
- Jassim Khan (Qat) made his T20I debut.

17 September 2023
20:30 (N)
Scorecard

Saudi Arabia; 121/9 (20 overs)	v	United Arab Emirates; 122/2 (14.2 overs)
Abdul Waheed 46 (42); Muhammad Jawadullah 4/27 (4 overs)		Muhammad Waseem 60* (43); Zain Ul Abidin 2/21 (4 overs)

United Arab Emirates won by 8 wickets
West End Park International Cricket Stadium, Doha
Umpires: Imran Mustafa (Kuw) and Mohammad Nasim (Qat)
Player of the match: Muhammad Jawadullah (UAE)

- Saudi Arabia won the toss and elected to bat.
- Kashif Abbas (Sau) made his T20I debut.

18 September 2023
16:00 (D/N)
Scorecard

Qatar; 156/3 (20 overs)	v	Kuwait; 155 (20 overs)
Imal Liyanage 49* (36); Shiraz Khan 2/17 (4 overs)		Ravija Sandaruwan 42 (29); Adnan Mirza 3/20 (4 overs)

Qatar won by 1 run
West End Park International Cricket Stadium, Doha
Umpires: Azad KR (Oma) and Shiju Sam (UAE)
Player of the match: Adnan Mirza (Qat)

- Kuwait won the toss and elected to field.

18 September 2023
20:30 (N)
Scorecard

Saudi Arabia; 110 (18.4 overs)	v	Bahrain; 114/4 (18.5 overs)
Manan Ali 49 (37); Rizwan Butt 4/24 (4 overs)		Junaid Aziz 39* (35); Ahmed Baladraf 2/19 (4 overs)

Bahrain won by 6 wickets
West End Park International Cricket Stadium, Doha
Umpires: Imran Mustafa (Kuw) and Mohammad Nasim (Qat)
Player of the match: Rizwan Butt (Bhr)

- Saudi Arabia won the toss and elected to bat.
- Ahmed Baladraf (Sau) made his T20I debut.

19 September 2023
16:00 (D/N)
Scorecard

United Arab Emirates; 176/4 (20 overs)	v	Kuwait; 145/8 (20 overs)
Muhammad Waseem 74 (39); Adnan Idrees 1/22 (3 overs)		Ravija Sandaruwan 36 (24); Ali Naseer 4/28 (4 overs)

United Arab Emirates won by 31 runs
West End Park International Cricket Stadium, Doha
Umpires: Azad KR (Oma) and Mohammed Younis (Bhr)
Player of the match: Muhammad Waseem (UAE)

- United Arab Emirates won the toss and elected to bat.
- Clinto Anto (Kuw) made his T20I debut.

19 September 2023
20:30 (N)
Scorecard

Bahrain; 123/7 (20 overs)	v	Oman; 122/9 (20 overs)
Imran Ali 44 (55); Fayyaz Butt 3/29 (4 overs)		Kashyap Prajapati 49 (53); Rizwan Butt 4/26 (4 overs)

Bahrain won by 1 run
West End Park International Cricket Stadium, Doha
Umpires: Rahat Ali (Sau) and Mohammad Nasim (Qat)
Player of the match: Rizwan Butt (Bhr)

- Oman won the toss and elected to field.

20 September 2023
16:00 (D/N)
Scorecard

United Arab Emirates; 166/7 (20 overs)	v	Qatar; 106 (18.1 overs)
Aryansh Sharma 58 (44); Himanshu Rathod 2/9 (2 overs)		Saqlain Arshad 27 (22); Zahoor Khan 4/16 (4 overs)

United Arab Emirates won by 60 runs
West End Park International Cricket Stadium, Doha
Umpires: Rahat Ali (Sau) and Imran Mustafa (Kuw)
Player of the match: Zahoor Khan (UAE)

- United Arab Emirates won the toss and elected to bat.
- Mohammed Irshad (Qat) made his T20I debut.

20 September 2023
20:30 (N)
Scorecard

Oman; 175/6 (20 overs)	v	Saudi Arabia; 128/7 (20 overs)
Naseem Khushi 64 (45); Khalander Mustafa 2/26 (4 overs)		Umair Sharif 44* (36); Ayaan Khan 2/16 (4 overs)

Oman won by 47 runs
West End Park International Cricket Stadium, Doha
Umpires: Shiju Sam (UAE) and Mohammed Younis (Bhr)
Player of the match: Ayaan Khan (Oma)

- Saudi Arabia won the toss and elected to field.
- Khalander Mustafa and Umair Sharif (Sau) both made their T20I debuts.

21 September 2023
20:30 (N)
Scorecard

Saudi Arabia; 148/6 (20 overs)	v	Qatar; 149/3 (18.4 overs)
Abdul Waheed 46 (42); Adnan Mirza 3/13 (3 overs)		Muhammad Tanveer 42* (28); Ahmed Baladraf 2/19 (4 overs)

Qatar won by 7 wickets
West End Park International Cricket Stadium, Doha
Umpires: Azad KR (Oma) and Shiju Sam (UAE)
Player of the match: Muhammad Tanveer (Qat)

- Qatar won the toss and elected to field.

22 September 2023
16:00 (D/N)
Scorecard

Bahrain; 150/5 (20 overs)	v	United Arab Emirates; 147/7 (20 overs)
Haider Butt 34 (36); Ali Naseer 1/21 (2 overs)		Muhammad Waseem 31 (24); Imran Anwar 2/33 (4 overs)

Bahrain won by 3 runs
West End Park International Cricket Stadium, Doha
Umpires: Azad KR (Oma) and Imran Mustafa (Kuw)
Player of the match: Haider Butt (Bhr)

- Bahrain won the toss and elected to bat.
- Nilansh Keswani (UAE) made his T20I debut.

22 September 2023
20:30 (N)
Scorecard

Oman; 171/6 (20 overs)	v	Kuwait; 103/9 (20 overs)
Aqib Ilyas 44 (34); Sayed Monib 3/26 (4 overs)		Mohammed Aslam 44 (34); Fayyaz Butt 2/5 (2 overs)

Oman won by 68 runs
West End Park International Cricket Stadium, Doha
Umpires: Rahat Ali (Sau) and Shiju Sam (UAE)
Player of the match: Ayaan Khan (Oma)

- Oman won the toss and elected to bat.

== Final ==
23 September 2023
19:00 (N)
Scorecard

United Arab Emirates; 163/5 (20 overs)	v	Oman; 164/5 (19.2 overs)
Muhammad Waseem 46 (31); Aqib Ilyas 2/24 (3 overs)		Aqib Ilyas 67 (33); Zahoor Khan 2/26 (4 overs)

Oman won by 5 wickets
West End Park International Cricket Stadium, Doha
Umpires: Rahat Ali (Sau) and Imran Mustafa (Kuw)
Player of the match: Aqib Ilyas (Oma)

- United Arab Emirates won the toss and elected to bat.
