= Bahraini cricket team against Kuwait in Oman in 2022 =

International cricket tour

Bahrain cricket team against Kuwait in Oman in 2022
	Bahrain	Kuwait
- Dates: 11 – 17 August 2022
Captains	Sarfaraz Ali (Note: Haider Butt captained Bahrain for the third, fourth and fifth T20Is.)	Mohammed Aslam

Twenty20 International series
- Results: Kuwait won the 5-match series 4–1
Most runs	Haider Butt (166)	Ravija Sandaruwan (167)
Most wickets	Sathaiya Veerapathiran (9)	Adnan Idrees (5); Sayed Monib (5)
- Player of the series: Ravija Sandaruwan (Kuw)

The Bahrain cricket team and Kuwait cricket team contested a five-match Twenty20 International (T20I) bilateral series in Oman in August 2022. The series provided Kuwait with preparation for the Asia Cup Qualifier that will be played at the same venue later in the month. The first match of the series ended as a tie, with Bahrain winning the Super Over tiebreaker. Kuwait levelled the series by winning a high-scoring second match. Kuwait won the third game, and went on to take an unassailable 3–1 lead in the series after winning the fourth game. The final game was a one-sided affair, with a hat-trick on his T20I debut for Shahrukh Quddus helping Kuwait take the match by 102 runs, and with it the series 4–1.

== Squads ==
Bahrain	Kuwait
Sarfaraz Ali (c); Waseeq Ahmed; Imran Anwar; Junaid Aziz; Shahbaz Badar (wk); Sikander Billah; Haider Butt; Janaka Chaturanga; Imran Khan; Sachin Kumar; Shahid Mahmood; David Mathias; Naveen Thailappan; Umer Toor; Sathaiya Veerapathiran; Muhammad Younis	Mohammed Aslam (c); Nawaf Ahmed; Meet Bhavsar (wk); Adnan Idrees; Muhammad Kashif; Shiraz Khan; Sayed Monib; Usman Patel (wk); Yasin Patel; Shahrukh Quddus; Ravija Sandaruwan; Mohamed Shafeeq; Haroon Shahid; Edson Silva; Bilal Tahir

== T20I series ==
=== 1st T20I ===
11 August 2022
19:00 (N)
Scorecard

Kuwait; 166/9 (20 overs)	v	Bahrain; 166/5 (20 overs)
Ravija Sandaruwan 47 (36); Imran Anwar 3/23 (3 overs)		Haider Butt 48* (36); Adnan Idrees 3/45 (4 overs)

Match tied
(Bahrain won the Super Over)
Oman Cricket Academy Ground Turf 1, Muscat
Umpires: Vinod Babu (Oma) and Harikrishna Pillai (Oma)
Player of the match: Haider Butt (Bhr)

- Bahrain won the toss and elected to field.
- Janaka Chaturanga, Sachin Kumar, Naveen Thailappan (Bhr), Mohamed Shafeeq and Haroon Shahid (Kuw) all made their T20I debuts.
- Super Over: Bahrain 19/0, Kuwait 8/0

=== 2nd T20I ===
13 August 2022
19:00 (N)
Scorecard

Kuwait; 209/9 (20 overs)	v	Bahrain; 189/8 (20 overs)
Ravija Sandaruwan 51 (33); Sarfaraz Ali 3/12 (2 overs)		Umer Toor 72 (38); Mohamed Shafeeq 3/28 (4 overs)

Kuwait won by 20 runs
Oman Cricket Academy Ground Turf 1, Muscat
Umpires: Azad KR (Oma) and Harikrishna Pillai (Oma)
Player of the match: Mohamed Shafeeq (Kuw)

- Bahrain won the toss and elected to field.

=== 3rd T20I ===
14 August 2022
19:00 (N)
Scorecard

Bahrain; 153/6 (20 overs)	v	Kuwait; 154/5 (17.4 overs)
David Mathias 61 (47); Sayed Monib 2/27 (4 overs)		Usman Patel 75* (47); Waseeq Ahmed 2/22 (4 overs)

Kuwait won by 5 wickets
Oman Cricket Academy Ground Turf 1, Muscat
Umpires: Harikrishna Pillai (Oma) and Anantha Rajamani (Oma)
Player of the match: Usman Patel (Kuw)

- Kuwait won the toss and elected to field.
- Imran Khan (Bhr) and Yasin Patel (Kuw) both made their T20I debuts.

=== 4th T20I ===
16 August 2022
19:00 (N)
Scorecard

Bahrain; 164/6 (20 overs)	v	Kuwait; 167/6 (18.3 overs)
David Mathias 30 (22); Sayed Monib 2/43 (4 overs)		Meet Bhavsar 51 (34); Sathaiya Veerapathiran 2/32 (3.3 overs)

Kuwait won by 4 wickets
Oman Cricket Academy Ground Turf 1, Muscat
Umpires: Vinod Babu (Oma) and Azad KR (Oma)
Player of the match: Edson Silva (Kuw)

- Kuwait won the toss and elected to field.

=== 5th T20I ===
17 August 2022
19:00 (N)
Scorecard

Kuwait; 186/7 (20 overs)	v	Bahrain; 84 (18.4 overs)
Meet Bhavsar 71 (48); Sathaiya Veerapathiran 2/49 (4 overs)		Junaid Aziz 22 (35); Yasin Patel 3/13 (4 overs)

Kuwait won by 102 runs
Oman Cricket Academy Ground Turf 1, Muscat
Umpires: Harikrishna Pillai (Oma) and Anantha Rajamani (Oma)
Player of the match: Shahrukh Quddus (Kuw)

- Bahrain won the toss and elected to field.
- Shahrukh Quddus (Kuw) made his T20I debut.
- Shahrukh Quddus became the first bowler for Kuwait to take a hat-trick in T20Is.
