= 2025 Hong Kong Quadrangular Series =

Cricket tournament

- Dates: 9 – 13 April 2025
- Administrator: Cricket Hong Kong, China
- Cricket format: Twenty20 International
- Tournament format(s): Round-robin and final
- Host: Hong Kong
- Champions: Kuwait
- Runners-up: Nepal
- Participants: 4
- Matches: 8
- Player of the series: (Hong Kong) Anshuman Rath
- Most runs: (Hong Kong) Anshuman Rath (248)
- Most wickets: (Qatar) Mohammed Irshad (8)

The 2025 Hong Kong Quadrangular Series was a cricket series that took place in Hong Kong in April 2025. It was a quadrangular series involving Hong Kong, Kuwait, Nepal and Qatar men's cricket teams, with the matches played as Twenty20 International (T20I) fixtures. All of the matches were played at the Mission Road Ground in Mong Kok. The tournament was played in a single round-robin format with the top two teams qualifying for the final.

== Squads ==
Hong Kong	Kuwait	Nepal	Qatar
Yasim Murtaza (c); Babar Hayat (vc); Zeeshan Ali (wk); Waqas Barkat; Kalhan Challu; Ateeq Iqbal; Aizaz Khan; Ehsan Khan; Nizakat Khan; Nasrulla Rana; Anshuman Rath; Ayush Shukla; Darsh Vora; Shahid Wasif (wk)	Mohammed Aslam (c); Ilyas Ahmed; Mirza Ahmed; Clinto Anto; Meet Bhavsar; Anudeep Chenthamara; Nimish Lathief; Usman Patel (wk); Yasin Patel; Naveenraj Rajendran; Ravija Sandaruwan; Mohamed Shafeeq; Bilal Tahir; Muhammad Umar	Rohit Paudel (c); Dipendra Singh Airee; Basir Ahamad; Shahab Alam; Lokesh Bam; Kushal Bhurtel; Rijan Dhakal; Gulsan Jha; Sompal Kami; Karan KC; Kushal Malla; Lalit Rajbanshi; Aasif Sheikh (wk); Nandan Yadav	Ikramullah Khan (c); Mohammad Abrar; Bukhar Illikkal; Mohammed Irshad; Muhammad Jabir; Shahzaib Jamil (wk); Jassim Khan; Bipin Kumar; Mujeeb-ur-Rehman; Arumugaganesh Nagarajan; Rifayi Theruvath

== Round-robin ==
=== Points table ===
Pos	Team	Pld	W	L	NR	Pts	NRR	Qualification
1	Nepal	3	2	0	1	5	1.088	Advanced to the final
2	Kuwait	3	2	1	0	4	1.797	Advanced to the final
3	Hong Kong	3	1	1	1	3	1.377	Advanced to the 3rd place play-off
4	Qatar	3	0	3	0	0	−3.437	Advanced to the 3rd place play-off

Source: ESPNcricinfo

=== Fixtures ===
9 April 2025
09:00
Scorecard

Qatar; 151/5 (20 overs)	v	Nepal; 154/2 (17 overs)
Ikramullah Khan 54 (54); Lalit Rajbanshi 1/12 (2 overs)		Kushal Bhurtel 38 (19); Mujeeb-ur-Rehman 2/12 (3 overs)

Nepal won by 8 wickets
Mission Road Ground, Mong Kok
Umpires: Tabarak Dar (HK) and Ramasamy Venkatesh (HK)
Player of the match: Kushal Bhurtel (Nep)

- Nepal won the toss and elected to field.
- Nandan Yadav (Nep) and Mohammad Abrar (Qat) both made their T20I debuts.

9 April 2025
13:30
Scorecard

Hong Kong; 175/5 (20 overs)	v	Kuwait; 180/6 (19 overs)
Anshuman Rath 76 (48); Mohamed Shafeeq 2/22 (3 overs)		Mohammed Aslam 55 (29); Yasim Murtaza 3/41 (4 overs)

Kuwait won by 4 wickets
Mission Road Ground, Mong Kok
Umpires: Shelton D'Cruz (HK) and John Prakash (HK)
Player of the match: Mohammed Aslam (Kuw)

- Kuwait won the toss and elected to field.
- Kalhan Challu (HK) and Anudeep Chenthamara (Kuw) both made their T20I debuts.
- Babar Hayat (HK) scored his 2000th run in T20Is.

10 April 2025
09:00
Scorecard

Kuwait; 185/8 (20 overs)	v	Nepal; 186/4 (18.5 overs)
Clinto Anto 41 (30); Sompal Kami 3/36 (4 overs)		Kushal Bhurtel 81 (50); Yasin Patel 2/17 (4 overs)

Nepal won by 6 wickets
Mission Road Ground, Mong Kok
Umpires: John Prakash (HK) and Ramasamy Venkatesh (HK)
Player of the match: Kushal Bhurtel (Nep)

- Nepal won the toss and elected to field.

10 April 2025
13:30
Scorecard

Hong Kong; 197/7 (20 overs)	v	Qatar; 129 (19.1 overs)
Anshuman Rath 58 (42); Mohammed Irshad 4/24 (3 overs)		Shahzaib Jamil 37 (22); Waqas Barkat 4/18 (4 overs)

Hong Kong won by 68 runs
Mission Road Ground, Mong Kok
Umpires: Tabarak Dar (HK) and Shelton D'Cruz (HK)
Player of the match: Waqas Barkat (HK)

- Qatar won the toss and elected to field.
- Darsh Vora (HK) made his T20I debut.

12 April 2025
09:00
Scorecard

Qatar; 124 (19.3 overs)	v	Kuwait; 127/4 (10 overs)
Shahzaib Jamil 34 (35); Anudeep Chenthamara 3/15 (3 overs)		Clinto Anto 72 (28); Mohammed Irshad 3/10 (2 overs)

Kuwait won by 6 wickets
Mission Road Ground, Mong Kok
Umpires: Niaz Ali (HK) and John Prakash (HK)
Player of the match: Clinto Anto (Kuw)

- Kuwait won the toss and elected to field.
- Naveenraj Rajendran (Kuw) made his T20I debut.

12 April 2025
13:30
Scorecard

Hong Kong; 68/3 (9 overs)	v	Nepal
Zeeshan Ali 30 (22); Lalit Rajbanshi 2/19 (3 overs)

No result
Mission Road Ground, Mong Kok
Umpires: Tabarak Dar (HK) and Shelton D'Cruz (HK)

- Nepal won the toss and elected to field.
- Rain prevented any further play.

== 3rd place play-off ==
13 April 2025
09:00
Scorecard

Hong Kong; 188/6 (20 overs)	v	Qatar; 187/5 (20 overs)
Anshuman Rath 97 (60); Muhammad Jabir 2/29 (4 overs)		Ikramullah Khan 55 (35); Yasim Murtaza 2/40 (2 overs)

Hong Kong won by 1 run
Mission Road Ground, Mong Kok
Umpires: Shelton J D'Cruz (HK) and John Prakash (HK)
Player of the match: Anshuman Rath (HK)

- Qatar won the toss and elected to field.

== Final ==
13 April 2025
13:30
Scorecard

Kuwait; 174/7 (20 overs)	v	Nepal; 171 (19.3 overs)
Ravija Sandaruwan 63 (36); Sompal Kami 2/26 (4 overs)		Basir Ahamad 80 (43); Anudeep Chenthamara 3/18 (2.3 overs)

Kuwait won by 3 runs
Mission Road Ground, Mong Kok
Umpires: Tabarak Dar (HK) and Ramasamy Venkatesh (HK)
Player of the match: Anudeep Chenthamara (Kuw)

- Nepal won the toss and elected to field.
- Ravija Sandaruwan (Kuw) scored his 2,000th run in T20Is.
