= List of tied Twenty20 Internationals =

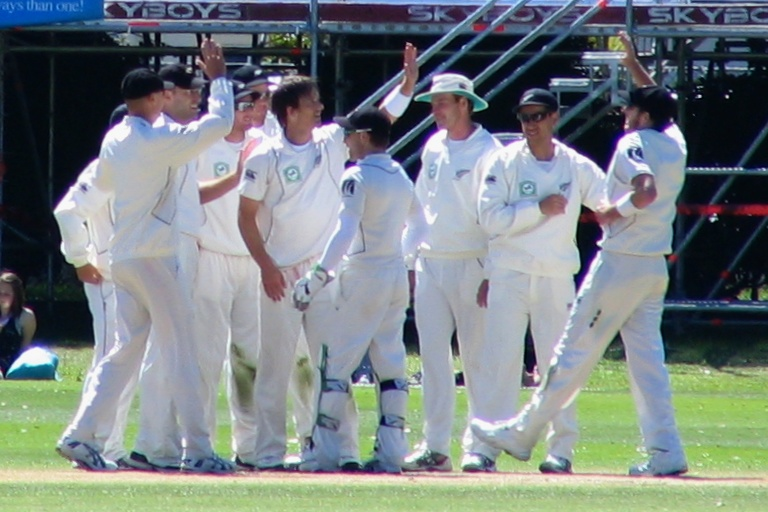
New Zealand (pictured in 2009) have been involved in ten Twenty20 Internationals tied matches.

A Twenty20 International (T20I) is an international cricket match between two representative teams, each having T20I status, as determined by the International Cricket Council (ICC), and is played under the rules of Twenty20 cricket. The first such match was played between Australia and New Zealand on 17 February 2005. A Twenty20 International can have three possible results: it can be won by one of the two teams, it could be tied, or it could be declared to have "no result". For a match to finish as a tie, both teams must have scored the same number of runs. The number of wickets lost is not considered. Although such matches are initially a tie, a tiebreak is usually played to determine a winner; prior to December 2008, this was a bowl-out, and since then it has been a Super Over.

The first tied T20I occurred in 2006, between New Zealand and the West Indies. Hosted at Eden Park in Auckland, it was the fifth T20I. The crowd had started to leave the stadium, disappointed with the result, when the bowl-out was announced; the 2007 Wisden Cricketers' Almanack reported that "suddenly the evening took a madcap turn." The next tie, involving India and Pakistan, happened during the group stages of the 2007 ICC World Twenty20. India won the resulting bowl-out, and were awarded two points, the equivalent of a win. In October 2008, the tie between Canada and Zimbabwe was the final international match to be decided by a bowl-out; Zimbabwe won 3–1. Two months later, New Zealand and the West Indies took part in the first Super Over in an international. The West Indies won the eliminator by scoring 25 runs in their extra over, compared to New Zealand's 15.

On 17 June 2018, a T20I between Scotland and Ireland was ended in a tie, though no Super Over was played. It was the tenth T20I match to end in a tie, and the first since the ICC playing conditions were implemented in September 2017, not to end with a Super Over. However, both teams knew that there would not be a Super Over in the event of a tie before the match. The International Cricket Council (ICC) confirmed that there should have been a Super Over, and apologised for the oversight. On 21 April 2021, a rain-curtailed T20I match between Malaysia and the Netherlands was ended in a tie, again no Super Over was played due to the lost time.

As of July 2026, there have been 48 tied Twenty20 Internationals. Every Test-playing nation except Bangladesh has been involved in a tied T20I. New Zealand have played in the most, involved in ten tied matches.

== Tied matches ==
†	indicates a World Cup match

Tied Twenty20 Internationals
No.	Date	Event	Batting first	Batting second	Venue	Result	Ref
1	16 February 2006	Tour	West Indies; 126/7 (20 overs)	New Zealand; 126/8 (20 overs)	Eden Park, Auckland; New Zealand	New Zealand won bowl-out, 3–0	
2	14 September 2007 †	World T20	India; 141/9 (20 overs)	Pakistan; 141/7 (20 overs)	Kingsmead, Durban; South Africa	India won bowl-out, 3–0	
3	11 October 2008	Quadrangular Series	Canada; 135/7 (20 overs)	Zimbabwe; 135/9 (20 overs)	Maple Leaf North-West Ground, King City; Canada	Zimbabwe won bowl-out, 3–1	
4	26 December 2008	Tour	New Zealand; 155/7 (20 overs)	West Indies; 155/8 (20 overs)	Eden Park, Auckland; New Zealand	West Indies won Super Over, 25/1 – 15/2	
5	28 February 2010	Tour	New Zealand; 214/6 (20 overs)	Australia; 214/4 (20 overs)	AMI Stadium, Christchurch; New Zealand	New Zealand won Super Over, 9/0 – 6/1	
6	7 September 2012	Tour	Pakistan; 151/4 (20 overs)	Australia; 151/8 (20 overs)	Dubai International Cricket Stadium; United Arab Emirates	Pakistan won Super Over, 12/0 – 11/1	
7	27 September 2012 †	World T20	New Zealand; 174/7 (20 overs)	Sri Lanka; 174/6 (20 overs)	Pallekele Cricket Stadium, Kandy; Sri Lanka	Sri Lanka won Super Over, 13/1 – 7/1	
8	1 October 2012 †	World T20	West Indies; 139 (19.3 overs)	New Zealand; 139/7 (20 overs)	Pallekele Cricket Stadium, Kandy; Sri Lanka	West Indies won Super Over, 19/0 – 17/0	
9	30 November 2015	Tour	England; 154/8 (20 overs)	Pakistan; 154/7 (20 overs)	Sharjah Cricket Stadium, Sharjah; United Arab Emirates	England won Super Over, 4/0 – 3/1	
10	17 June 2018	Netherlands Tri-Nation	Scotland; 185/4 (20 overs)	Ireland; 185/6 (20 overs)	Sportpark Het Schootsveld, Deventer; Netherlands	No tiebreaker	
11	22 January 2019	ACC Western Region T20	Qatar; 155/6 (20 overs)	Kuwait; 155/8 (20 overs)	Oman Cricket Academy Ground Turf 1, Muscat; Oman	Qatar won Super Over, 6/0 – 5/1	
12	19 March 2019	Tour	Sri Lanka; 134/7 (20 overs)	South Africa; 134/8 (20 overs)	Newlands Cricket Ground, Cape Town; South Africa	South Africa won Super Over, 14/0 – 5/0	
13	31 May 2019	Inter-Insular Cup	Jersey; 128/9 (20 overs)	Guernsey; 128/8 (20 overs)	College Field, Saint Peter Port; Guernsey	Jersey won Super Over, 15/0 – 14/1	
14	25 June 2019	Tour	Netherlands; 152/8 (20 overs)	Zimbabwe; 152 (20 overs)	Hazelaarweg, Rotterdam; Netherlands	Zimbabwe won Super Over, 18/0 – 9/1	
15	5 July 2019	Tour	Kuwait; 112 (20 overs)	Qatar; 112/8 (20 overs)	West End Park, Doha; Qatar	Qatar won Super Over, 14 – 12	
16	10 November 2019	Tour	New Zealand; 146/5 (11 overs)	England; 146/7 (11 overs)	Eden Park, Auckland; New Zealand	England won Super Over, 17/0 – 8/1	
17	29 January 2020	Tour	India; 179/5 (20 overs)	New Zealand; 179/6 (20 overs)	Seddon Park, Hamilton; New Zealand	India won Super Over, 17/0 – 20/0	
18	31 January 2020	Tour	India; 165/8 (20 overs)	New Zealand; 165/5 (20 overs)	Sky Stadium, Wellington; New Zealand	India won Super Over, 13/1 – 16/1	
19	10 March 2020	Tour	Ireland; 142/8 (20 overs)	Afghanistan; 142/7 (20 overs)	Greater Noida Sports Complex Ground, Greater Noida; India	Ireland won Super Over, 8/0 – 12/1	
20	21 April 2021	Nepal Tri-Nation	Netherlands; 107/4 (13 overs)	Malaysia; 91/4 (10 overs)	Tribhuvan University International Cricket Ground, Kirtipur; Nepal	Match tied (DLS method)	
21	25 October 2021	Tour	Malta; 145 (19 overs)	Gibraltar; 57/2 (7.2 overs)	Marsa Sports Club, Marsa; Malta	Match tied (DLS method)	
22	10 November 2021	T20 World Cup Qualifier	Canada; 142/5 (20 overs)	United States; 142/8 (20 overs)	Coolidge Cricket Ground; Antigua	United States won Super Over, 22/1 – 14/0	
23	13 February 2022	Tour	Australia; 164/6 (20 overs)	Sri Lanka; 164/8 (20 overs)	Sydney Cricket Ground; Australia	Australia won Super Over, 9/0 – 5/1	
24	11 August 2022	Tour	Kuwait; 166/9 (20 overs)	Bahrain; 166/5 (20 overs)	Oman Cricket Academy Ground Turf 1, Muscat; Oman	Bahrain won Super Over, 19/0 – 8/0	
25	22 November 2022	Tour	New Zealand; 160 (19.4 overs)	India; 75/4 (9 overs)	McLean Park, Napier; New Zealand	Match tied (DLS method)	
26	16 December 2022	Malaysia Quadrangular	Bahrain; 144/8 (20 overs)	Singapore; 144/7 (20 overs)	UKM-YSD Cricket Oval, Bangi; Malaysia	Bahrain won Super Over, 11/0 – 10/1	
27	2 April 2023	Tour	Sri Lanka; 196/5 (20 overs)	New Zealand; 196/8 (20 overs)	Eden Park, Auckland; New Zealand	Sri Lanka won Super Over, 12/0 – 8/2	
28	28 May 2023	Nordic Cup	Sweden; 96 (17.4 overs)	Finland; 96/9 (20 overs)	Solvangs Park, Glostrup; Denmark	Finland won Super Over, 15/0 – 13/1	
29	11 June 2023	Central Europe Cup	Czech Republic; 169/4 (20 overs)	Hungary; 169 (19.3 overs)	Vinoř Cricket Ground, Prague; Czech Republic	Czech Republic won Super Over, 10/0 – 6/1	
30	5 October 2023	West Africa Trophy	Rwanda; 121/7 (20 overs)	Ghana; 121 (20 overs)	Tafawa Balewa Square Cricket Oval, Lagos; Nigeria	Ghana won Super Over, 6/1 – 3/2	
31	5 November 2023	T20 World Cup Qualifier	Nepal; 184/6 (20 overs)	Oman; 184/9 (20 overs)	Tribhuvan University International Cricket Ground, Kirtipur; Nepal	Oman won Super Over, 21/0 – 10/1	
32	24 December 2023	Tour	Philippines; 137/9 (20 overs)	Indonesia; 137/9 (20 overs)	Udayana Cricket Ground, Jimbaran; Indonesia	Philippines won Super Over, 10/0 – 9/1	
33	17 January 2024	Tour	India; 212/4 (20 overs)	Afghanistan; 212/6 (20 overs)	M. Chinnaswamy Stadium, Bengaluru; India	First super over tied, 16/0 – 16/1; India won 2nd Super Over, 11/2 – 1/2	
34	1 March 2024	Tour	Qatar; 125 (20 overs)	Hong Kong; 125/8 (20 overs)	West End Park International Cricket Stadium, Doha; Qatar	Hong Kong won Super Over, 21/0 – 3/1	
35	10 May 2024	Mdina Cup	Belgium; 142/8 (20 overs)	France; 142 (19.4 overs)	Dreux Sport Cricket Club, Dreux; France	France won Super Over, 12/0 – 7/2	
36	2 June 2024 †	T20 World Cup	Oman; 109/10 (19.4 overs)	Namibia; 109/6 (20 overs)	Kensington Oval, Bridgetown; Barbados	Namibia won Super Over, 21/0 – 10/1	
37	6 June 2024 †	T20 World Cup	Pakistan; 159/7 (20 overs)	United States; 159/3 (20 overs)	Grand Prairie Stadium, Dallas; United States	United States won Super Over, 18/1 – 13/1	
38	30 July 2024	Tour	India; 137/9 (20 overs)	Sri Lanka; 137/8 (20 overs)	Pallekele International Cricket Stadium, Pallekele; Sri Lanka	India won Super Over, 4/0 – 2/2	
39	20 October 2024	Tour	Nepal; 170/6 (20 overs)	United States; 170/8 (20 overs)	Grand Prairie Stadium, Dallas; United States	Nepal won Super Over, 3/0 – 2/2	
40	14 March 2025	Malaysia Tri-Nation	Hong Kong; 129/7 (20 overs)	Bahrain; 129/8 (20 overs)	Bayuemas Oval, Pandamaran; Malaysia	Hong Kong won Super Over, 1/0 – 0/2	
41	16 June 2025	Scotland Tri-Nation	Netherlands; 152/7 (20 overs)	Nepal; 152/8 (20 overs)	Titwood, Glasgow; Scotland	First super over tied, 19/1 – 19/0; Second super over tied, 17/1 – 17/0; Netherlands won 3rd Super Over, 6/0 – 0/2	
42	23 July 2025	Tour	Saudi Arabia; 123 (19.3 overs)	Qatar; 123/9 (20 overs)	West End Park International Cricket Stadium, Doha; Qatar	Saudi Arabia won Super Over, 17/0 – 14/0	
43	13 September 2025	Tour	Eswatini; 222/4 (20.0 overs)	Mozambique; 222/4 (20 overs)	Malkerns Country Club Oval, Malkerns; Eswatini	Eswatini won Super Over, 14/0 – 13/0	
44	26 September 2025	Asia Cup	India; 202/5 (20.0 overs)	Sri Lanka; 202/5 (20 overs)	Dubai International Cricket Stadium, Dubai; UAE	India won Super Over, 3/0 – 2/2	
45	11 February 2026 †	T20 World Cup	South Africa; 187/6 (20 overs)	Afghanistan; 187 (19.4 overs)	Narendra Modi Stadium, Ahmedabad; India	First super over tied, 17/1 – 17/0; South Africa won 2nd Super Over, 23/0 – 19/2	
46	28 February 2026	Thailand Quadrangular Series	Japan; 108/9 (20.0 overs)	Bahrain; 108/9 (20 overs)	Terdthai Cricket Ground, Bangkok; Thailand	Bahrain won Super Over, 15/1 – 10/2	
47	9 May 2026	Tour	Malta; 165/9 (20.0 overs)	Gibraltar; 165/4 (20 overs)	Marsa Sports Club, Marsa; Malta	Gibraltar won Super Over, 12/0 – 9/1	
48	2 July 2026	Tour	Sweden; 156 (20.0 overs)	Portugal; 156/7 (20 overs)	Botkyrka Cricket Center, Stockholm; Sweden	Portugal won Super Over, 21/0 – 14/1	

== By teams ==
Teams involved in the most tied T20Is
Teams	No. of Tied Matches
New Zealand	10
India	7
Sri Lanka	6
Bahrain	4
Pakistan	4
Qatar	4
Afghanistan	3
Australia	3
Kuwait	3
Nepal	3
Netherlands	3
West Indies	3
United States	3
Canada	2
England	2
Gibraltar	2
Hong Kong	2
Ireland	2
Malta	2
Oman	2
South Africa	2
Sweden	2
Zimbabwe	2
Belgium	1
Czech Republic	1
Eswatini	1
France	1
Finland	1
Ghana	1
Guernsey	1
Hungary	1
Indonesia	1
Japan	1
Jersey	1
Malaysia	1
Mozambique	1
Namibia	1
Philippines	1
Portugal	1
Rwanda	1
Saudi Arabia	1
Scotland	1
Singapore	1
Total	96 (48 tied matches)

== See also ==
- Tied Test
- List of tied first-class cricket matches
- List of tied One Day Internationals
- List of tied Women's Twenty20 Internationals
