= 2022 Asia Cup Qualifier =

Cricket tournament

- Dates: 20 – 24 August 2022
- Administrator: Asian Cricket Council
- Cricket format: Twenty20 International
- Tournament format: Round-robin
- Host: Oman
- Champions: Hong Kong (2nd title)
- Runners-up: Kuwait
- Participants: 4
- Matches: 6
- Most runs: (Hong Kong) Yasim Murtaza (130)
- Most wickets: (Hong Kong) Ehsan Khan (9)

The 2022 Asia Cup Qualification was a men's cricket tournament which took place in Oman in August 2022 to determine qualification for the 2022 Asia Cup (which was originally scheduled to be played in 2020). The 2020 editions of the ACC Western and Eastern regional T20 tournaments were held in February and March of the same year by the Asian Cricket Council (ACC). Thirteen teams competed (eight in the Western and five in the Eastern event), with the aim of progressing to the qualifier. These were scheduled to be followed by the Asia Cup Qualifier tournament in Malaysia, which was due to be played in August 2020. However, in July 2020 the Asia Cup was postponed due to the COVID-19 pandemic, resulting in the postponement of the qualifier. In May 2021, the Asian Cricket Council confirmed that there would be no Asia Cup in 2021, with that edition of the tournament deferred until 2023. It was later announced that there would be a T20I Asia Cup in 2022, to be hosted by the United Arab Emirates.

== Summary ==
The Western Region qualifier was held by the Gulf Cooperation Council (GCC) in Oman in February 2020 and the Eastern region qualifier was held in Thailand from 29 February to 6 March 2020. UAE and Kuwait advanced to the main Asia Cup Qualification after reaching the final of the Western Region event and they were joined by Singapore and Hong Kong who finished in the top two positions in the Eastern event. These four teams contested the Asia Cup Qualifier to determine the sixth team to take part in the 2022 Asia Cup (joining the five Asian Full Members of the International Cricket Council).

China were originally scheduled to take part in the Eastern Region Group, but they withdrew in February 2020 due to the COVID-19 pandemic. Bhutan and Myanmar, who were also included in the original schedule, later withdrew their participation. On 23 February 2020, Iran played their first ever T20I match, when they faced the United Arab Emirates in Group B of the Western Region qualifier.

All matches in the qualification tournaments had Twenty20 International (T20I) status.

== Teams ==
Eastern Region Group	Western Region Group
~~Bhutan~~; ~~China~~; Hong Kong; Malaysia; ~~Myanmar~~; Nepal; Singapore; Thailand	Bahrain; Iran; Kuwait; Maldives; Oman; Qatar; Saudi Arabia; United Arab Emirates

== 2020 ACC Western Region T20 ==
2020 ACC Western Region T20
- Dates: 23 – 27 February 2020
- Administrator: Asian Cricket Council
- Cricket format: T20I
- Tournament format(s): Round-robin and playoffs
- Host: Oman
- Champions: United Arab Emirates
- Runners-up: Kuwait
- Participants: 8
- Matches: 15
- Most runs: (United Arab Emirates) Chirag Suri (239)
- Most wickets: (Kuwait) Mohammed Aslam (12)

The 2020 ACC Western Region T20 tournament was held from 23 to 27 February 2020 in Muscat, Oman, and acted as a first qualifying stage for the 2020 Asia Cup. Bahrain, Kuwait, Maldives, Oman, Saudi Arabia and the UAE all announced their squads for the tournament. Following the conclusion of the group stage matches of the Western Region, Bahrain, Kuwait, Qatar and the UAE had all progressed to the semi-finals.

An incredible six-wicket win for Bahrain over Qatar in the final group match saw them climb to the top of Group A, with both teams progressing to the semi-finals at the expense of favourites Oman by virtue of slightly better net run rates. Kuwait and the UAE won their respective semi-final matches to advance to the final of the Western Region group and to the Asia Cup Qualifier. United Arab Emirates went on to win the final by 102 runs.

=== Group stage ===
==== Group A ====
Pos	Team	Pld	W	L	T	NR	Pts	NRR
1	Bahrain	3	2	1	0	0	4	1.461
2	Qatar	3	2	1	0	0	4	1.391
3	Oman	3	2	1	0	0	4	1.040
4	Maldives	3	0	3	0	0	0	−3.793

Source: ESPNcricinfo

Advance to semi-finals

23 February 2020
09:30
Scorecard

Qatar; 196/4 (20 overs)	v	Maldives; 90/9 (20 overs)
Kamran Khan 88 (53); Ihala Kumara 2/32 (3 overs)		Nilantha Cooray 26 (23); Awais Malik 2/15 (4 overs)

Qatar won by 106 runs
Oman Cricket Academy Ground Turf 1, Muscat
Umpires: Rahat Ali (Sau) and Anantha Rajamani (Oma)
Player of the match: Kamran Khan (Qat)

- Qatar won the toss and elected to bat.
- Ihala Kumara (Mdv) made his T20I debut.

23 February 2020
13:30
Scorecard

Bahrain; 83 (17.1 overs)	v	Oman; 84/2 (13.2 overs)
Shahbaz Badar 24 (27); Khawar Ali 4/16 (4 overs)		Khawar Ali 38* (44); Abdul Majid Malik 2/16 (4 overs)

Oman won by 8 wickets
Oman Cricket Academy Ground Turf 1, Muscat
Umpires: Rahat Ali (Sau) and Imran Mustafa (Kuw)
Player of the match: Khawar Ali (Oma)

- Bahrain won the toss and elected to bat.
- Mohammad Sanuth (Oma), Junaid Aziz, Imran Butt, Abdul Majid Malik and Sathaiya Veerapathiran (Bhr) all made their T20I debuts.

24 February 2020
09:30
Scorecard

Qatar; 175/5 (20 overs)	v	Oman; 141 (19.1 overs)
Kamran Khan 54 (40); Khawar Ali 2/26 (4 overs)		Khawar Ali 38 (32); Awais Malik 3/28 (4 overs)

Qatar won by 34 runs
Oman Cricket Academy Ground Turf 2, Muscat
Umpires: Rahat Ali (Sau) and Mohammed Younis (Bhr)
Player of the match: Kamran Khan (Qat)

- Qatar won the toss and elected to bat.

24 February 2020
13:30
Scorecard

Bahrain; 186/9 (20 overs)	v	Maldives; 121/9 (20 overs)
Sarfaraz Ali 50 (22); Nilantha Cooray 2/21 (4 overs)		Nilantha Cooray 40 (41); Imran Anwar 2/16 (4 overs)

Bahrain won by 65 runs
Oman Cricket Academy Ground Turf 2, Muscat
Umpires: Riyaz Kurupkar (Qat) and Imran Mustafa (Kuw)
Player of the match: Sarfaraz Ali (Bhr)

- Bahrain won the toss and elected to bat.
- Muhammad Younis (Bhr) made his T20I debut.

25 February 2020
09:30
Scorecard

Maldives; 129/7 (20 overs)	v	Oman; 132/0 (14.2 overs)
Mohamed Rishwan 61 (42); Bilal Khan 2/16 (4 overs)		Khawar Ali 72* (45)

Oman won by 10 wickets
Oman Cricket Academy Ground Turf 1, Muscat
Umpires: Riyaz Kurupkar (Qat) and Mohammed Younis (Bhr)
Player of the match: Khawar Ali (Oma)

- Oman won the toss and elected to field.
- Ahmed Raid (Mdv) made his T20I debut.

25 February 2020
13:30
Scorecard

Qatar; 106/9 (20 overs)	v	Bahrain; 109/4 (11.5 overs)
Kamran Khan 46 (43); Abdul Majid Malik 4/23 (4 overs)		Sarfaraz Ali 43 (27); Mohammed Nadeem 1/17 (2 overs)

Bahrain won by 6 wickets
Oman Cricket Academy Ground Turf 1, Muscat
Umpires: Afzalkhan Pathan (Oma) and Anantha Rajamani (Oma)
Player of the match: Sarfaraz Ali (Bhr)

- Qatar won the toss and elected to bat.
- Mohammed Sameer (Bhr) made his T20I debut.

==== Group B ====
Pos	Team	Pld	W	L	T	NR	Pts	NRR
1	United Arab Emirates	3	3	0	0	0	6	3.114
2	Kuwait	3	2	1	0	0	4	1.539
3	Saudi Arabia	3	1	2	0	0	2	0.489
4	Iran	3	0	3	0	0	0	−6.221

Source: ESPNcricinfo

Advance to semi-finals

23 February 2020
09:30
Scorecard

Iran; 61/8 (20 overs)	v	United Arab Emirates; 62/0 (5.3 overs)
Yousef Shadzehisarjou 14 (21); Rohan Mustafa 2/6 (4 overs)		Rohan Mustafa 41* (18)

United Arab Emirates won by 10 wickets
Oman Cricket Academy Ground Turf 2, Muscat
Umpires: Riyaz Kurupkar (Qat) and Imran Mustafa (Kuw)
Player of the match: Rohan Mustafa (UAE)

- United Arab Emirates won the toss and elected to field.
- Navid Abdollahpour, Navid Balouch, Naiem Bameri, Dad Dahani, Hamid Hashemi, Masood Jayezeh, Arshad Mazarzei, Ali Mohammadipour, Yousef Shadzehisarjou, Emran Shahbakhsh, Nader Zahadiafzal (Irn), Vriitya Aravind, Basil Hameed and Alishan Sharafu (UAE) all made their T20I debuts.

23 February 2020
13:30
Scorecard

Saudi Arabia; 113 (17.5 overs)	v	Kuwait; 114/1 (10.4 overs)
Faisal Khan 26 (11); Muhammad Ansar 3/35 (3.5 overs)		Ravija Sandaruwan 84* (38); Adil Butt 1/14 (2 overs)

Kuwait won by 9 wickets
Oman Cricket Academy Ground Turf 2, Muscat
Umpires: Afzalkhan Pathan (Oma) and Mohammed Younis (Bhr)
Player of the match: Ravija Sandaruwan (Kuw)

- Kuwait won the toss and elected to field.
- Muhammad Ansar, Aphsal Ashraf, Sayed Monib, Usman Patel (Kuw), Adil Butt, Sarfraz Butt, Abdul Waheed and Imran Yousaf (Sau) all made their T20I debuts.

24 February 2020
09:30
Scorecard

Iran; 72/9 (20 overs)	v	Saudi Arabia; 73/1 (5.3 overs)
Yousef Shadzehisarjou 20 (39); Faisal Khan 2/14 (4 overs)		Abdul Waheed 41* (16); Nader Zahadiafzal 1/10 (1 over)

Saudi Arabia won by 9 wickets
Oman Cricket Academy Ground Turf 1, Muscat
Umpires: Afzalkhan Pathan (Oma) and Anantha Rajamani (Oma)
Player of the match: Abdul Waheed (Sau)

- Saudi Arabia won the toss and elected to field.
- Mehran Dorri, Adel Kolasangiani (Irn), Ali Abbas and Khawar Zafar (Sau) all made their T20I debuts.

24 February 2020
13:30
Scorecard

United Arab Emirates; 186/5 (20 overs)	v	Kuwait; 139 (17.4 overs)
Rohan Mustafa 51 (37); Sayed Monib 2/30 (4 overs)		Ravija Sandaruwan 49 (32); Zahoor Khan 3/18 (3 overs)

United Arab Emirates won by 47 runs
Oman Cricket Academy Ground Turf 1, Muscat
Umpires: Anantha Rajamani (Oma) and Mohammed Younis (Bhr)
Player of the match: Rohan Mustafa (UAE)

- Kuwait won the toss and elected to field.
- Naveed Fakhr (Kuw) made his T20I debut.

25 February 2020
09:30
Scorecard

United Arab Emirates; 150 (19 overs)	v	Saudi Arabia; 138/7 (20 overs)
Chirag Suri 75 (55); Abdul Wahid 4/14 (3 overs)		Muhammad Naeem 27 (22); Ahmed Raza 2/18 (4 overs)

United Arab Emirates won by 12 runs
Oman Cricket Academy Ground Turf 2, Muscat
Umpires: Imran Mustafa (Kuw) and Afzalkhan Pathan (Oma)
Player of the match: Chirag Suri (UAE)

- United Arab Emirates won the toss and elected to bat.
- Mohammad Ayaz and Ansh Tandon (UAE) both made their T20I debuts.

25 February 2020
13:30
Scorecard

Iran; 108/8 (20 overs)	v	Kuwait; 109/2 (12.5 overs)
Yousef Shadzehisarjou 39 (46); Mohammed Aslam 4/5 (4 overs)		Usman Patel 59* (39); Naiem Bameri 1/14 (3 overs)

Kuwait won by 8 wickets
Oman Cricket Academy Ground Turf 2, Muscat
Umpires: Rahat Ali (Sau) and Riyaz Kurupkar (Qat)
Player of the match: Mohammed Aslam (Kuw)

- Kuwait won the toss and elected to field.
- Mehran Siasar (Irn) made his T20I debut.

=== Play-offs ===
==== Semi-final 1 ====
26 February 2020
09:30
Scorecard

Kuwait; 210/4 (20 overs)	v	Bahrain; 123 (17 overs)
Ravija Sandaruwan 67 (39); Abdul Majid Malik 1/21 (4 overs)		Fiaz Ahmed 30 (25); Mohammed Aslam 4/23 (4 overs)

Kuwait won by 87 runs
Oman Cricket Academy Ground Turf 1, Muscat
Umpires: Rahat Ali (Sau) and Riyaz Kurupkar (Qat)
Player of the match: Ravija Sandaruwan (Kuw)

- Bahrain won the toss and elected to field.

==== Semi-final 2 ====
26 February 2020
09:30
Scorecard

United Arab Emirates; 122 (18.4 overs)	v	Qatar; 94 (20 overs)
Chirag Suri 38 (31); Iqbal Hussain 4/16 (3.4 overs)		Tamoor Sajjad 29 (23); Junaid Siddique 4/12 (4 overs)

United Arab Emirates won by 28 runs
Oman Cricket Academy Ground Turf 2, Muscat
Umpires: Imran Mustafa (Kuw) and Afzalkhan Pathan (Oma)
Player of the match: Junaid Siddique (UAE)

- United Arab Emirates won the toss and elected to bat.

==== Final ====
27 February 2020
09:30
Scorecard

United Arab Emirates; 199/5 (20 overs)	v	Kuwait; 97/7 (20 overs)
Chirag Suri 60 (41); Aphsal Ashraf 2/35 (4 overs)		Mohammed Aslam 23* (24); Sultan Ahmed 4/9 (4 overs)

United Arab Emirates won by 102 runs
Oman Cricket Academy Ground Turf 1, Muscat
Umpires: Rahat Ali (Sau) and Afzalkhan Pathan (Oma)
Player of the match: Sultan Ahmed (UAE)

- Kuwait won the toss and elected to field.

== 2020 ACC Eastern Region T20 ==
2020 ACC Eastern Region T20
- Dates: 29 February – 6 March 2020
- Administrator: Asian Cricket Council
- Cricket format: T20I
- Tournament format: Round-robin
- Host: Thailand
- Champions: Singapore
- Runners-up: Hong Kong
- Participants: 5
- Matches: 10
- Player of the series: (Singapore) Tim David
- Most runs: (Singapore) Sidhant Singh (153)
- Most wickets: (Hong Kong) Aftab Hussain (8) (Singapore) Anantha Krishna (8)

The 2020 ACC Eastern Region T20 tournament took place from 29 February to 6 March 2020 in Bangkok, Thailand, and acted as a first qualifying stage for the 2020 Asia Cup. It was the first official men's T20I tournament to be played in Thailand. China were initially due to play in the Eastern Region tournament, but were forced to withdraw due to the COVID-19 pandemic. Bhutan and Myanmar were also included in the original schedule, but later withdrew. Hong Kong, Malaysia, Nepal and Singapore all announced their squads for the tournament, with Aizaz Khan, Ahmad Faiz, Gyanendra Malla and Amjad Mahboob as their respective captains.

The opening day of the tournament saw the hosts beaten by Singapore, followed by a surprise defeat for the much-fancied Nepal against Malaysia, who came into the event on the back of a 5–0 series whitewash against Hong Kong. Nepal were beaten again on day two, this time by Hong Kong, and Thailand also suffered a second defeat with Malaysia taking a second victory. Singapore thrashed the in-form Malaysians by 128 runs on day three thanks to an unbeaten 92 from just 32 balls for Tim David, and they were joined by Hong Kong on a record of two wins from two matches after their comfortable victory over Thailand. After the penultimate round of matches, Nepal were eliminated despite Sandeep Lamichhane bowling a world record 22 dot ball deliveries in their victory over Thailand, due to Singapore's 16-run win over Hong Kong. The result also secured Singapore's qualification, and meant that the game between Hong Kong and Malaysia on the final day would determine the remaining place in the Asia Cup Qualifier. Singapore won the tournament unbeaten with seven points, after their last fixture against Nepal was abandoned due to rain. Hong Kong's victory over Malaysia in the last match of the tournament secured their qualification. Singapore's Tim David was named player of the tournament, while compatriot Sidhant Singh and Hong Kong's Aftab Hussain won the batting and bowling awards, respectively.

=== Round-robin ===
Pos	Team	Pld	W	L	T	NR	Pts	NRR
1	Singapore	4	3	0	0	1	7	3.117
2	Hong Kong	4	3	1	0	0	6	1.674
3	Malaysia	4	2	2	0	0	4	−0.748
4	Nepal	4	1	2	0	1	3	0.690
5	Thailand	4	0	4	0	0	0	−4.283

Source: ESPNcricinfo

Advance to Asia Cup Qualifier

29 February 2020
09:30
Scorecard

Singapore; 139/7 (20 overs)	v	Thailand; 96 (19 overs)
Sidhant Singh 59 (50); Mahsid Faheem 2/11 (2 overs)		Daniel Jacobs 28 (28); Karthikeyan Subramanian 3/27 (4 overs)

Singapore won by 43 runs
Terdthai Cricket Ground, Bangkok
Umpires: Viswanadan Kalidas (Mas) and Sanjay Sarda (Tha)
Player of the match: Sidhant Singh (Sin)

- Thailand won the toss and elected to field.
- Sorawat Desungnoen, Robert Raina, Nopphon Senamontree, Phiriyapong Suanchuai, Wanchana Uisuk (Tha) and Karthikeyan Subramanian (Sin) all made their T20I debuts.

29 February 2020
13:30
Scorecard

Malaysia; 154/6 (20 overs)	v	Nepal; 132 (19.5 overs)
Syed Aziz 51* (35); Sandeep Lamichhane 3/22 (4 overs)		Gyanendra Malla 38 (33); Sharvin Muniandy 4/13 (3.5 overs)

Malaysia won by 22 runs
Terdthai Cricket Ground, Bangkok
Umpires: Balraj Manikandan (Sin) and Ashwani Kumar Rana (Tha)
Player of the match: Sharvin Muniandy (Mas)

- Malaysia won the toss and elected to bat.
- Sandeep Lamichhane became the first bowler for Nepal to take 100 wickets in Twenty20 cricket.

1 March 2020
09:30
Scorecard

Hong Kong; 154/6 (20 overs)	v	Nepal; 111 (18.1 overs)
Nizakat Khan 48 (29); Sandeep Lamichhane 2/25 (4 overs)		Gyanendra Malla 46 (43); Haroon Arshad 5/16 (3.1 overs)

Hong Kong won by 43 runs
Terdthai Cricket Ground, Bangkok
Umpires: Samad Akbar (Tha) and Viswanadan Kalidas (Mas)
Player of the match: Haroon Arshad (HK)

- Nepal won the toss and elected to field.
- Haroon Arshad became the first bowler for Hong Kong to take a five-wicket haul in T20Is.

1 March 2020
13:30
Scorecard

Thailand; 85/9 (20 overs)	v	Malaysia; 86/2 (11.5 overs)
Henno Jordaan 37 (47); Pavandeep Singh 2/6 (4 overs)		Virandeep Singh 41* (34); Vichanath Singh 1/17 (1.5 overs)

Malaysia won by 8 wickets
Terdthai Cricket Ground, Bangkok
Umpires: Sanjay Gurung (Nep) and Balraj Manikandan (Sin)
Player of the match: Pavandeep Singh (Mas)

- Thailand won the toss and elected to bat.

3 March 2020
09:30
Scorecard

Singapore; 239/3 (20 overs)	v	Malaysia; 111 (15.1 overs)
Tim David 92* (32); Fitri Sham 1/31 (4 overs)		Ahmad Faiz 25 (16); Anantha Krishna 4/28 (3.1 overs)

Singapore won by 128 runs
Terdthai Cricket Ground, Bangkok
Umpires: Arif Ansari (Tha) and Ashwani Kumar Rana (Tha)
Player of the match: Tim David (Sin)

- Singapore won the toss and elected to bat.

3 March 2020
13:30
Scorecard

Thailand; 77/8 (20 overs)	v	Hong Kong; 78/2 (7.4 overs)
Ziaul Hoque 23* (26); Ehsan Khan 2/9 (4 overs); Kinchit Shah 2/9 (4 overs)		Nizakat Khan 36 (19); Naveed Pathan 1/19 (1.4 overs)

Hong Kong won by 8 wickets
Terdthai Cricket Ground, Bangkok
Umpires: Sanjay Gurung (Nep) and Viswanadan Kalidas (Mas)
Player of the match: Kinchit Shah (HK)

- Thailand won the toss and elected to bat.
- Ismail Sardar (Tha) made his T20I debut.

4 March 2020
09:30
Scorecard

Thailand; 66 (20 overs)	v	Nepal; 72/1 (5.3 overs)
Phiriyapong Suanchuai 13* (16); Karan KC 3/12 (4 overs)		Kushal Malla 36* (18); Nopphon Senamontree 1/27 (2.3 overs)

Nepal won by 9 wickets
Terdthai Cricket Ground, Bangkok
Umpires: Sanjay Gurung (Nep) and Balraj Manikandan (Sin)
Player of the match: Karan KC (Nep)

- Thailand won the toss and elected to bat.
- Bhuvan Karki (Nep) made his T20I debut.
- Sandeep Lamichhane (Nep) bowled a world record 22 dot balls in a T20I.

4 March 2020
13:30
Scorecard

Singapore; 168/5 (20 overs)	v	Hong Kong; 152/8 (20 overs)
Tim David 58 (46); Aftab Hussain 2/23 (4 overs)		Jamie Atkinson 50 (45); Aahan Gopinath Achar 2/21 (4 overs)

Singapore won by 16 runs
Terdthai Cricket Ground, Bangkok
Umpires: Samad Akbar (Tha) and Viswanadan Kalidas (Mas)
Player of the match: Manpreet Singh (Sin)

- Singapore won the toss and elected to bat.

6 March 2020
09:30
Scorecard

Nepal	v	Singapore

Match abandoned
Terdthai Cricket Ground, Bangkok
Umpires: Arif Ansari (Tha) and Viswanadan Kalidas (Mas)

- No toss.
- No play was possible due to rain.

6 March 2020
13:30
Scorecard

Malaysia; 132/6 (20 overs)	v	Hong Kong; 133/4 (18.5 overs)
Virandeep Singh 33 (30); Aizaz Khan 2/24 (4 overs)		Shahid Wasif 50 (49); Pavandeep Singh 2/32 (4 overs)

Hong Kong won by 6 wickets
Terdthai Cricket Ground, Bangkok
Umpires: Sanjay Gurung (Nep) and Balraj Manikandan (Sin)
Player of the match: Shahid Wasif (HK)

- Malaysia won the toss and elected to bat.

== 2022 Asia Cup Qualifier ==
The four-team Asia Cup Qualifier was originally scheduled to take place in Kuala Lumpur in August 2020. The qualifier was held in Oman in August 2022, immediately before the Asia Cup.

Kuwait and the UAE reached the final of the Western Region group, and as a result, also advanced to the Asia Cup Qualifier. Singapore and Hong Kong finished as the top two teams in the Eastern Region group, joining Kuwait and the UAE in the Asia Cup Qualifier. However, in July 2020, the Asia Cup was postponed to June 2021 due to the COVID-19 pandemic. The Asia Cup was again postponed to August and September 2022, with the qualifier started on 20 August 2022. Originally scheduled to take place in Sri Lanka, both the Qualifier and the Asia Cup were moved to Oman and the UAE respectively due to the economic and political crisis in Sri Lanka.

Hong Kong qualified for the main event after a first-place finish in the qualifier.

=== Squads ===
Hong Kong	Kuwait	Singapore	United Arab Emirates
Nizakat Khan (c); Kinchit Shah (vc); Zeeshan Ali; Haroon Arshad; Mohammad Ghazanfar; Babar Hayat; Aftab Hussain; Ateeq Iqbal; Aizaz Khan; Ehsan Khan; Scott McKechnie (wk); Yasim Murtaza; Dhananjay Rao; Wajid Shah; Ayush Shukla; Ahan Trivedi; Mohammad Waheed	Mohammed Aslam (c); Nawaf Ahmed; Mohammad Amin; Meet Bhavsar (wk); Adnan Idrees; Muhammad Kashif; Shiraz Khan; Sayed Monib; Usman Patel; Yasin Patel; Shahrukh Quddus; Ravija Sandaruwan; Mohamed Shafeeq; Haroon Shahid; Edson Silva; Bilal Tahir; Ali Zaheer	Amjad Mahboob (c); Vinoth Baskaran; Abdul Rahman Bhadelia; Adwitya Bhargava; Surendran Chandramohan; Aryaveer Chaudhry; Aman Desai; Avi Dixit; Aritra Dutta; Rezza Gaznavi; Vihaan Maheshwari; Janak Prakash; Rohan Rangarajan; Jeevan Santhanam; Manpreet Singh (wk); Aryaman Sunil	Chundangapoyil Rizwan (c); Sultan Ahmed; Sabir Ali; Vriitya Aravind (wk); Kashif Daud; Zawar Farid; Basil Hameed; Zahoor Khan; Aryan Lakra; Karthik Meiyappan; Rohan Mustafa; Fahad Nawaz; Ahmed Raza; Alishan Sharafu; Junaid Siddique; Chirag Suri; Muhammad Waseem

=== Round-robin ===
Pos	Team	Pld	W	L	T	NR	Pts	NRR
1	Hong Kong	3	3	0	0	0	6	0.641
2	Kuwait	3	2	1	0	0	4	1.627
3	United Arab Emirates	3	1	2	0	0	2	0.538
4	Singapore	3	0	3	0	0	0	−2.684

Source: ESPNcricinfo

Advanced to Asia Cup

20 August 2022
18:00 (D/N)
Scorecard

Hong Kong; 148/9 (20 overs)	v	Singapore; 140/7 (20 overs)
Kinchit Shah 34 (32); Akshay Puri 2/17 (4 overs)		Janak Prakash 31 (32); Ehsan Khan 3/20 (4 overs)

Hong Kong won by 8 runs
Oman Cricket Academy Ground Turf 1, Muscat
Umpires: Buddhi Pradhan (Nep) and Shiju Sam (UAE)
Player of the match: Ehsan Khan (HK)

- Singapore won the toss and elected to field.
- Ateeq Iqbal (HK) made his T20I debut.

21 August 2022
18:00 (D/N)
Scorecard

United Arab Emirates; 173/5 (20 overs)	v	Kuwait; 177/9 (19.5 overs)
Chirag Suri 88 (61); Shiraz Khan 1/29 (4 overs); Sayed Monib 1/29 (4 overs)		Ravija Sandaruwan 34 (25); Basil Hameed 3/22 (4 overs)

Kuwait won by 1 wicket
Oman Cricket Academy Ground Turf 1, Muscat
Umpires: Rahul Asher (Oma) and Harikrishna Pillai (Oma)
Player of the match: Edson Silva (Kuw)

- Kuwait won the toss and elected to field.

22 August 2022
18:00 (D/N)
Scorecard

United Arab Emirates; 160/8 (20 overs)	v	Singapore; 113 (18.3 overs)
Muhammad Waseem 58 (34); Janak Prakash 3/35 (4 overs)		Aritra Dutta 42 (29); Karthik Meiyappan 3/13 (4 overs)

United Arab Emirates won by 47 runs
Oman Cricket Academy Ground Turf 1, Muscat
Umpires: Naveen D'Souza (Kuw) and Tabarak Dar (HK)
Player of the match: Karthik Meiyappan (UAE)

- Singapore won the toss and elected to field.
- Adwitya Bhargava (Sin), Sabir Ali and Aryan Lakra (UAE) all made their T20I debuts.

23 August 2022
18:00 (D/N)
Scorecard

Kuwait; 151/9 (20 overs)	v	Hong Kong; 153/2 (17.4 overs)
Edson Silva 56 (30); Yasim Murtaza 2/11 (4 overs)		Babar Hayat 53* (30); Adnan Idrees 1/16 (2 overs)

Hong Kong won by 8 wickets
Oman Cricket Academy Ground Turf 1, Muscat
Umpires: Rahul Asher (Oma) and Shiju Sam (UAE)
Player of the match: Yasim Murtaza (HK)

- Hong Kong won the toss and elected to field.

24 August 2022
16:00 (D/N)
Scorecard

Singapore; 104 (19.5 overs)	v	Kuwait; 105/4 (7.5 overs)
Janak Prakash 29 (33); Yasin Patel 4/22 (4 overs)		Sayed Monib 32* (10); Vinoth Baskaran 3/39 (2.5 overs)

Kuwait won by 6 wickets
Oman Cricket Academy Ground Turf 1, Muscat
Umpires: Tabarak Dar (HK) and Harikrishna Pillai (Oma)
Player of the match: Yasin Patel (Kuw)

- Singapore won the toss and elected to bat.
- Ali Zaheer (Kuw) made his T20I debut.

24 August 2022
20:00 (N)
Scorecard

United Arab Emirates; 147 (19.3 overs)	v	Hong Kong; 149/2 (19 overs)
Chundangapoyil Rizwan 49 (44); Ehsan Khan 4/24 (4 overs)		Yasim Murtaza 58 (43); Basil Hameed 1/31 (4 overs)

Hong Kong won by 8 wickets
Oman Cricket Academy Ground Turf 1, Muscat
Umpires: Rahul Asher (Oma) and Buddhi Pradhan (Nep)
Player of the match: Ehsan Khan (HK)

- Hong Kong won the toss and elected to field.
