= 2007 ACC Twenty20 Cup =

- Administrator: Asian Cricket Council
- Cricket format: Twenty20
- Tournament format: Group Stage with Finals
- Host: Kuwait
- Champions: Afghanistan and Oman (1st title)
- Participants: 10

The 2007 ACC Twenty20 Cup was played from 27 October until 2 November 2007 in Kuwait.

The ten competing teams were: Afghanistan, Hong Kong, Kuwait, Malaysia, Nepal, Oman, Qatar, Saudi Arabia, Singapore and the UAE.

== Group stage ==
=== Group A ===
Group A saw eventual finalists Oman and Afghanistan finish in the top two and qualify for the semi-final stage. Malaysia failed to win a match, despite featuring Somerset player Arul Suppiah in their squad.

Team	M	W	L	T	NR	Pts
Oman	4	3	1	0	0	6
Afghanistan	4	3	1	0	0	6
Qatar	4	2	2	0	0	4
Nepal	4	2	2	0	0	4
Malaysia	4	0	4	0	0	0

=== Group B ===
Group B was a closer group than Group A. The UAE topped the group after winning all four of their games, and hosts Kuwait joined them in the semi-finals after finishing ahead of Singapore.

Team	M	W	L	T	NR	Pts
United Arab Emirates	4	4	0	0	0	8
Kuwait	4	2	2	0	0	4
Singapore	4	2	2	0	0	4
Hong Kong	4	1	3	0	0	2
Saudi Arabia	4	1	3	0	0	2

== Semi-finals ==
1 November 2007
(scorecard)

Oman; 160/9 (20 overs)	v	Kuwait; 122 all out (19.3 overs)
Adnan Ilyas 48 (36); Azmatullah 2/31 (4 overs)		Azmatullah 41 (28 overs); Hemin Desai 3/22 (3 overs)

Oman won by 38 runs
Unity Cricket Club
Umpires: Vinay Jha, Siva Sarika
Player of the match: Hemin Desai

1 November 2007
(scorecard)

Afghanistan; 163 all out (19.5 overs)	v	United Arab Emirates; 116 all out (18.4 overs)
Nowroz Mangal 61 (30); Shadeep Silva 4/22 (3.5 overs)		Amjad Javed 36 (20); Samiullah Shinwari 4/20 (3.4 overs)

Afghanistan won by 47 runs
Unity Cricket Club
Umpires: Srinivasan, Riaz Chaudhari
Player of the match: Nowroz Mangal

== 3rd place play-off ==
2 November 2007
(scorecard)

Kuwait; 126/7 (20 overs)	v	United Arab Emirates; 123/8 (20 overs)
Yaseen Mughal 24* (25); Shadeep Silva 2/35 (4 overs)		Saqib Ali 53 (38); Yaseen Mughal 4/21 (3 overs)

Kuwait won by 3 runs
KOC Cricket Ground
Umpires: not known
Player of the match: Yaseen Mughal

== Final ==
2 November 2007
(scorecard)

Afghanistan; 151/9 (20 overs)	v	Oman; 151/7 (20 overs)
Karim Sadiq 27 (24); Zeshan Ahmed 3/30 (3 overs)		Nelesh Palmer 66 (56); Hameed Hasan 2/31 (4 overs)

Match tied
KOC Cricket Ground
Umpires: Waseem Abbas, Naveed Malik
Player of the match: Nelesh Palmer

- Tournament regulations stated that a Bowl-out was to be used in the event of a tie, but due to the poor condition of the pitch after the match it was cancelled and the trophy shared

== Final standings ==
Position	Team
1st	Oman Afghanistan
3rd	Kuwait
4th	United Arab Emirates
5th	Qatar
6th	Singapore
7th	Nepal
8th	Saudi Arabia
9th	Hong Kong
10th	Malaysia

== See also ==
- ACC Twenty20 Cup
- ACC Trophy
