= Maldives national cricket team =

Maldives
- Nickname: The Red Sea Cucumber
- Association: Cricket Board of Maldives

Personnel
- Captain: Azyan Farhath
- Coach: Mr. Ismail Nihad

International Cricket Council
- ICC status: Associate member (2017)
- ICC region: Asia
ICC Rankings	Current	Best-ever
T20I	84th	66th (2 May 2022)

International cricket
- First international: v Papua New Guinea at Kuala Lumpur, Malaysia, 7 September 1996

T20 Internationals
- First T20I: v Kuwait at Al Emarat Cricket Stadium, Muscat; 20 January 2019
- Last T20I: v Saudi Arabia at UKM-YSD Cricket Oval, Bangi; 14 October 2026
T20Is	Played	Won/Lost
Total	55	12/41 (0 ties, 2 no results)
This year	5	1/3 (0 ties, 1 no result)
T20I kit
- As of 12 October 2026

The Maldives national cricket team represents the country of Maldives in international cricket. Although they did not become an affiliate member of the International Cricket Council (ICC) until 2001, they have taken part in the ACC Trophy on every occasion since its inception in 1996. They have never progressed beyond the first round of the tournament. They became an associate member in 2017.

With the separation of the ACC Trophy into Elite and Challenge divisions, following their performance at the 2006 ACC Trophy, the Maldives competed in the Challenge divisions in both 2009 (when they came 3rd) and in the 2010 competition. The 2010 competition marked their first victory in an international tournament, defeating Saudi Arabia by 1 wicket in the final of the competition.

As of February 2024, Pasindu Liyanaarachichi is the National Men's Coach. Azyan Farhath is the National Men's Captain.

== History ==
=== 2018-Present ===
In April 2018, the ICC decided to grant full Twenty20 International (T20I) status to all its members. Therefore, all Twenty20 matches played between the Maldives and other ICC members after 1 January 2019 have the full T20I status.

Maldives made its Twenty20 International debut on 20 January 2019, losing to Kuwait by eight wickets in the 2019 ACC Western Region T20 at Al Emarat Cricket Stadium, Muscat, Oman.

20 January 2019
09:30
Scorecard

Maldives; 102 (18.4 overs)	v	Kuwait; 103/2 (10.3 overs)
Mohamed Rishwan 25 (23); Imran Ali 3/16 (3 overs)		Ravija Sandaruwan 68* (36); Ameel Mauroof 1/11 (3 overs)

Kuwait won by 8 wickets
Al Amerat Cricket Stadium, Muscat
Umpires: Vinod Babu (Oma) and Shivani Mishra (Qat)
Player of the match: Ravija Sandaruwan (Kuw)

- Kuwait won the toss and elected to field.
- First ever T20I match for Maldives.

== Tournament history ==
=== Cricket World Cup ===
World Cup record
Year	Round	Position	P	W	L	T	NR
(England) 1975	Did not qualify						
(England) 1979	Did not qualify						
(England) 1983	Did not qualify						
(India) (Pakistan) 1987	Did not qualify						
(Australia) (New Zealand) 1992	Did not qualify						
(India) (Pakistan) (Sri Lanka) 1996	Did not qualify						
(England) 1999	Did not qualify						
(South Africa) (Zimbabwe) (Kenya) 2003	Did not qualify						
(Cricket West Indies) 2007	Did not qualify						
(India) (Sri Lanka) (Bangladesh) 2011	Did not qualify						
(Australia) (New Zealand) 2015	Did not qualify						
(England) 2019	Did not qualify						
(India) 2023	Did not qualify						
(South Africa) (Zimbabwe) (Namibia) 2027	To be determined						
(India) (Bangladesh) 2031	To be determined						
Total	–	0/12	0	0	0	0	0

=== ICC T20 World Cup ===
ICC T20 World Cup
Year	Round	Position	GP	W	L	T	NR
(South Africa) 2007	Did not qualify						
(England) 2009	Did not qualify						
(Cricket West Indies) 2010	Did not qualify						
(Sri Lanka) 2012	Did not qualify						
(Bangladesh) 2014	Did not qualify						
(India) 2016	Did not qualify						
(United Arab Emirates) (Oman) 2021	Did not qualify						
(Australia) 2022	Did not qualify						
(United States) (Cricket West Indies) 2024	Did not qualify						
(India) (Sri Lanka) 2026	Did not qualify						
(Australia) (New Zealand) 2028	To be determined						
(England) (Republic of Ireland) (Scotland) 2030	To be determined						
Total	–	0/9	0	0	0	0	0

=== ACC Men's Challenger Cup ===
ACC Men's Challenger Cup record
Host/Year	Round	Position	GP	W	L	T	NR
(Thailand) 2023	Group stage	7th	3	1	2	0	0
(Thailand) 2024	7th place play-off	7th	4	1	3	0	0
Total	2/2	0 Titles	7	2	5	0	0

=== Asia Cup Qualifier ===
ACC Asia Cup Qualifier record
Year/Host	Round	Position	GP	W	L	T	NR
(Bangladesh) 2016	Did not participate						
(Malaysia) 2018	Did not participate						
(Oman) 2020	Did not participate						
(Oman) 2022	Did not qualify						
Total	0/4	0 Titles	0	0	0	0	0

=== ACC Premier Cup ===
ACC Premier Cup record
Host/Year	Round	Position	GP	W	L	T	NR
(Nepal) 2023	Did not qualify						
(Oman) 2024	Did not qualify						
Total	0/2	0 Titles	0	0	0	0	0

=== ACC Western Region T20 ===
ACC Western Region T20 record
Host/Year	Round	Position	GP	W	L	T	NR
(Oman) 2019	Round robin	5th	4	0	4	0	0
(Oman) 2020	Group stage	7th	3	0	3	0	0
Total	2/2	0 Titles	7	0	7	0	0

=== ACC Trophy ===
ACC Trophy Cup record
Host/Year	Round	Position	GP	W	L	T	NR
(Malaysia) 1996	Group stage	9th	5	1	4	0	0
(Nepal) 1998	Group stage	7th	4	1	2	0	1
(United Arab Emirates) 2000	Group stage	5th	3	1	2	0	0
(Singapore) 2002	Group stage	7th	4	1	3	0	0
(Malaysia) 2004	Group stage	13th	3	0	3	0	0
(Malaysia) 2006	Group stage	14th	3	0	2	0	1
Total	6/6	0 Titles	22	4	16	0	2

=== ACC Trophy Challenge ===
ACC Trophy Challenge Cup record
Host/Year	Round	Position	GP	W	L	T	NR
(Thailand) 2009	3rd Place Playoff	3rd	5	3	2	0	0
(Kuwait) 2010	Finals	1st	5	4	1	0	0
Total	2/6	1 Title	10	7	3	0	0

=== ACC Trophy Elite ===
ACC Trophy Challenge Cup record
Host/Year	Round	Position	GP	W	L	T	NR
(United Arab Emirates) 2012	Group stage	8th	4	1	3	0	0
Total	1/1	0 Titles	4	1	3	0	0

=== ACC Twenty20 Cup ===
ACC Twenty20 Cup record
Host/Year	Round	Position	GP	W	L	T	NR
(Nepal) 2011	Group stage	8th	5	1	4	0	0
(Nepal) 2013	Group stage	8th	4	1	3	0	0
(United Arab Emirates) 2015	Group stage	6th	5	0	5	0	0
Total	1/1	0 Titles	5	1	4	0	0

=== Asian Games ===
Asia Games record
Host/Year	Round	Position	GP	W	L	T	NR
(China) 2010	Group stage	9th	2	0	2	0	0
(South Korea) 2014	Group stage	9th	2	0	1	0	1
(China) 2022	Group stage	9th	2	1	1	0	0
Total	3/3	0 Titles	6	1	4	0	1

== Current squad ==
This lists all the players who played for Maldives in the past 12 months or were named in the most recent squad. Updated as of 23 October 2024.

Name	Age	Batting style	Bowling style	Notes
Batters
Azyan Farhath	26	Right-handed	Right-arm leg break	Captain
Ismail Ali	33	Right-handed	Right-arm off break	
Kaushal Rodrigo	34	Left-handed	Right-arm off break	
Shaof Hassan	24	Right-handed	Right-arm medium	
All-rounders
Umar Adam	28	Right-handed	Right-arm off break	
Ameel Mauroof	34	Left-handed	Left-arm medium	
Ibrahim Nashath	31	Right-handed	Right-arm medium	
Wicketkeepers
Mohamed Azzam	35	Right-handed		
Hassan Rasheed	33	Right-handed		Vice-Captain
Mohamed Rishwan	32	Right-handed		
Spin Bowlers
Ibrahim Rizan	30	Right-handed	Right-arm off break	
Shunan Ali	28	Right-handed	Right-arm leg break	
Pace Bowlers
Ibrahim Hassan	35	Right-handed	Right-arm medium	
Leem Shafeeq	31	Right-handed	Right-arm medium	

== Records and statistics ==
International Match Summary — Maldives

Last updated 14 October 2026

Playing Record
Format	M	W	L	T	NR	Inaugural Match
Twenty20 Internationals	55	12	41	0	2	20 January 2019

=== Twenty20 International ===
- Highest team total: 178/6 v. Mongolia, 6 September 2024 at Bayuemas Oval, Pandamaran.
- Highest individual score: 71, Kaushal Rodrigo v. Qatar, 1 October 2023 at West End Park International Cricket Stadium, Doha.
- Best individual bowling figures: 5/24, Ibrahim Hassan v. Bahrain, 21 January 2019 at Al Amerat Cricket Stadium, Muscat.

Most T20I runs for Maldives

Player	Runs	Average	Career span
Azyan Farhath	891	28.74	2019–2026
Umar Adam	810	17.23	2019–2026
Mohamed Rishwan	641	17.80	2019–2026
Ahmed Hassan	338	17.78	2019–2022
Mohamed Azzam	314	9.23	2019–2024

Most T20I wickets for Maldives

Player	Wickets	Average	Career span
Umar Adam	56	22.62	2019–2026
Ibrahim Hassan	43	25.81	2019–2024
Ibrahim Rizan	33	25.12	2019–2026
Azyan Farhath	24	16.12	2019–2026
Leem Shafeeq	20	25.40	2019–2024

T20I record versus other nations

Records complete to T20I #4201. Last updated 14 October 2026.

Opponent	M	W	L	T	NR	First match	First win
vs Associate Members
Bahrain	3	0	3	0	0	21 January 2019	
Bhutan	8	4	4	0	0	7 December 2019	7 December 2019
China	1	1	0	0	0	8 October 2026	8 October 2026
Hong Kong	2	0	1	0	1	3 September 2024	
Indonesia	1	1	0	0	0	19 October 2024	19 October 2024
Japan	1	0	1	0	0	4 February 2024	
Kuwait	5	0	5	0	0	20 January 2019	
Malaysia	6	0	5	0	1	25 June 2019	
Mongolia	2	2	0	0	0	28 September 2023	28 September 2023
Myanmar	1	1	0	0	0	5 September 2024	5 September 2024
Nepal	3	0	3	0	0	6 December 2019	
Oman	1	0	1	0	0	25 February 2020	
Qatar	5	0	5	0	0	23 January 2019	
Saudi Arabia	6	0	6	0	0	22 January 2019	
Singapore	3	0	3	0	0	2 February 2024	
Thailand	7	3	4	0	0	26 June 2019	26 June 2019

== See also ==
- List of Maldives Twenty20 International cricketers
- Maldives women's national cricket team
