= Sarfaraz Ali =

Bahraini cricketer

Personal information
- Full name: Sarfaraz Ali
- Born: 21 October 1981 (age 45); Karachi, Pakistan
- Batting: Right-handed
- Bowling: Right-arm medium
- Role: Top-order batsman

International information
- National side: Bahrain
- T20I debut (cap 9): 19 January 2019 v Saudi Arabia
- Last T20I: 3 November 2023 v Oman

Career statistics
Competition	T20I	T20
Matches	17	17
Runs scored	569	569
Batting average	35.56	35.56
100s/50s	0/4	0/4
Top score	69*	69*
Balls bowled	267	267
Wickets	8	8
Bowling average	38.62	38.62
5 wickets in innings	–	–
10 wickets in match	–	–
Best bowling	2/20	2/20
Catches/stumpings	4/–	4/–
- Source: ESPNCricinfo, 31 October 2023

Sarfaraz Ali (born 20 October 1981) is a Pakistani-born cricketer who plays for the Bahrain national cricket team and currently captains the national team in Twenty20 Internationals.

== Career ==
Ali debuted internationally for the Bahraini cricket team on 20 January 2019, against Saudi Arabia in the opening game of the 2019 ACC Western Region T20, in which he was awarded man-of-the-match for his performance (making 30 runs with the bat and claiming bowling figures of 2/20). He went on to score 141 runs at an average of 35.25 throughout the tournament and took no additional wickets.

He was then selected to play in the 2020 ACC Western Region T20, in which Ali scored 112 runs and took 2 wickets throughout the tournament. He led the team to the semi-finals of the tournament, but lost to Kuwait in a crushing 87-run loss.

Ali didn't play for the rest of 2020 and the majority of 2021 due to the COVID-19 pandemic. Ali returned to cricket by playing in the 2021 ICC Men's T20 World Cup Asia Qualifier. His team came out as the champions, with Ali scoring 159 runs and taking a wicket during the tournament. He then went on to captain the team in the 2022 ICC Men's T20 World Cup Global Qualifier A, in which Bahrain placed 6th in, after being beaten by the Canadians in the 5th place play-offs. Bahrain played valiantly, eventually just nearly missing the semi-finals on net run rate to the United Arab Emirates. Ali scored 157 runs and took 3 wickets during the qualifier.
