= ACC Trophy =

- Administrator: Asian Cricket Council
- Format: 50-over
- First edition: 1996
- Latest edition: 2012
- Most successful: United Arab Emirates (5 titles)

The ACC Trophy was a limited-overs cricket tournament organised by the Asian Cricket Council (ACC). Open only to associate and affiliate members of the International Cricket Council (ICC), it was contested biennially between 1996 and 2012, but was replaced by the three-division ACC Premier League in 2014 as the primary limited-overs competition for non-Test-playing ACC members. The tournament was discontinued for 9 years, and reinvented as ACC Premier Cup in 2023. The finalists of the 2000 and 2006 tournaments qualified for the Asia Cup, where matches had One Day International (ODI) status.

The inaugural edition of the tournament was played in Malaysia in 1996, and featured 12 teams in a single division. The single-division format continued until the 2006 tournament, which featured a record 17 teams. The ACC Trophy was then split into "Elite" (first-grade) and "Challenge" (second-grade) divisions, with the first editions held under this format being the 2008 ACC Trophy Elite and the 2009 ACC Trophy Challenge (the latter tournament was the only one to be held in an odd year). The two-division format continued until the final tournament in 2012, with promotion and relegation between divisions.

Only six teams – Hong Kong, Malaysia, the Maldives, Nepal, Singapore, and the United Arab Emirates – competed in all nine editions of the ACC Trophy, although the Maldives and Singapore were relegated to the "Challenge" tournament at various stages after the introduction of two divisions. The UAE was by far the most successful ACC Trophy team, with five wins (and four consecutive victories from 2000 to 2006). Bangladesh won the first two tournaments, but were rendered ineligible after gaining Test status.

== Previous finals ==
ACC Trophy
Tournament	Final venue	Scores	Result
(Malaysia); 1996	Kuala Lumpur	Bangladesh 212 in 49.3 overs (Shahriar Hossain 58; Saleem Raza 3-31); United Arab Emirates 104 in 36.5 overs (Arshad Laeeq 31*; Sheikh Salahuddin 3–13)	Bangladesh won by 108 runs
(Nepal); 1998	Kathmandu	Malaysia 83 in 37.2 overs (Rohan Selvaratnam 25; Aminul Islam 3-22); Bangladesh 85/2 in 21.1 overs (Shahriar Hossain 51; Matthew William 1–5)	Bangladesh won by 8 wickets
(United Arab Emirates); 2000	Sharjah	Hong Kong 186 49.4 overs (Rahul Sharma 78; Asim Saeed 4-32); United Arab Emirates 191/7 in 44 overs (Mehmood Pir Baksh 56; Mohammad Zubair 4-30)	UAE won by 3 wickets
(Singapore); 2002	Singapore	Nepal 184 in 50 overs (Paresh Lohani 52; Arshad Ali 4-24); United Arab Emirates 185/4 in 38.3 overs (Khuram Khan 60*; Binod Das 2-27)	UAE won by 6 wickets
(Malaysia); 2004	Kuala Lumpur	United Arab Emirates 253/7 in 50 overs (Syed Maqsood 67; Hemal Mehta 3-38); Oman 159 in 44 overs (Hemal Mehta 39; Ali Asad 4-38)	UAE won by 94 runs
(Malaysia); 2006	Kuala Lumpur	Hong Kong 174/8 in 50 overs (Tim Smart 56; Arshad Ali 3-35); United Arab Emirates 175/5 in 35.3 overs (Khurram Khan 59*; Nadeem Ahmed 3-48)	UAE won by 5 wickets
ACC Trophy Elite
Tournament	Final venue	Scores	Result
(Malaysia); 2008	Kuala Lumpur	United Arab Emirates 243/7 in 50 overs (Saqib Ali 102; Najeeb Amar 4-61); Hong Kong 205/7 in 34.1 overs (Najeeb Amar 100; Shadeep Silva 3-39)	Hong Kong won by 3 wickets (D/L)
(Kuwait); 2010	Kuwait City	Afghanistan 224 in 50 overs (Karim Sadiq 58; Binod Das 3-35); Nepal 129 in 40 overs (Sharad Vesawkar 35; Nowroz Mangal 2–9)	Afghanistan won by 95 runs
(United Arab Emirates); 2012	Sharjah	United Arab Emirates 241/6 in 50 overs (Saqib Ali 101*; Shakti Gauchan 3-36); Nepal 241/9 in 50 overs (Subash Khakurel 55; Ahmed Raza 2-44)	Match tied. Nepal and UAE shared trophy.
ACC Trophy Challenge
Tournament	Final venue	Scores	Result
(Thailand); 2009	Chiang Mai	Oman 322/9 in 50 overs (Adnan Ilyas 138; Lobzang Yonten 2-56); Bhutan 104 in 40 overs (Kumar Subba 40; Hemal Mehta 3-22)	Oman won by 213 runs
(Thailand); 2010	Bangkok	Saudi Arabia 139 in 43.3 overs (Shoaib Ali 39; Ahmed Faiz 3–19); Maldives 140/9 in 41.4 overs (Abdulla Shahid 30; Shoaib Ali 5-25)	Maldives won by 1 wicket
(Thailand); 2012	Chiang Mai	Singapore 214/8 in 50 overs (Chetan Suryawanshi 40; Qamar Saeed 3-27); Bahrain 190 in 45.4 overs (Sameer Yousuf 31; Amjad Mahboob 5-22)	Singapore won by 24 runs

== ACC Trophy records ==
=== Team records ===
- Highest total: United Arab Emirates 510/6 (50 overs) v Bhutan, 2010
- Lowest total: Myanmar 10 all out (12.1 overs) v Nepal, 2006
- Most wins: UAE 5, Nepal 2, Bangladesh 2, Hong Kong 1, Afghanistan 1

=== Individual records ===
- Most runs in an innings: Arshad Ali United Arab Emirates 213* (146)
- Most runs in a career: Arshad Ali United Arab Emirates 461
- Best batting average: Arshad Ali United Arab Emirates 153.66
- Best bowling in an innings: Mehboob Alam Nepal 7/3 v Myanmar, 2006
- Most wickets in a career: Mehboob Alam Nepal 52
- Best bowling ave: Kashif Butt United Arab Emirates 3.00
- Most catches by an outfielder (career): Khuram Khan United Arab Emirates 5
- Most wicket-keeping dismissals (career): Mohammad Nadeem United Arab Emirates 8
- Most ACC Trophy appearances:

== Best Partnerships ==
Note: Records are incomplete.

1. Sarfraz Ahmed & Fahad Suleiman for Saudi Arabia v Brunei 201*
2. Rahul Sharma & Khalid Butt for Hong Kong v Singapore 181
3. Muhammad Jahangir & Irfan Ahmed for Qatar v Thailand 174
4. Nowroz Khan & Karim Sadiq for Afghanistan v Malaysia 171
5. Chaminda Ruwan & Munish Arora for Singapore v Bahrain 170
6. Omer Taj & Muhammad Jahangir for Qatar v Iran 174
7. Muhammed Iqbal & Arshad Ali for United Arab Emirates v Brunei 166
8. Rahul Sharma & Khalid Butt for Hong Kong v Myanmar 161
9. Nadeem Babar & Hammad Saeed for *Saudi Arabia v Brunei 158
10. Arshad Ali & Saqib Ali for United Arab Emirates v Brunei 152

== Participating teams ==
Legend

- 1st – Champions
- 2nd – Runners-up
- 3rd – Third place
- SF – Semi-finalist
- GS – Group stage
- Q – Qualified
- — Hosts

Team	(Malaysia) 1996	(Nepal) 1998	(United Arab Emirates) 2000	(Singapore) 2002	(Malaysia) 2004	(Malaysia) 2006	(Malaysia) 2008	(Kuwait) 2010	(United Arab Emirates) 2012	Total
Afghanistan	—	—	—	—	6th	3rd	3rd	1st	3rd	5
Bahrain	—	—	—	—	GS	6th	7th	10th	—	4
Bangladesh	1st	1st	—	—	—	—	—	—	—	2
Bhutan	—	—	—	—	QF	13th	—	8th	10th	4
Brunei	GS	—	—	—	—	15th	—	—	—	2
Fiji	SF	—	—	—	—	—	—	—	—	1
Hong Kong	GS	SF	2nd	SF	GS	2nd	1st	3rd	5th	9
Iran	—	—	—	—	GS	16th	—	—	—	2
Japan	GS	GS	GS	—	—	—	—	—	—	3
Kuwait	—	—	GS	GS	3rd	9th	8th	7th	7th	7
Malaysia	GS	2nd	SF	SF	QF	7th	6th	4th	4th	9
Maldives	GS	GS	GS	GS	GS	14th	—	—	8th	7
Myanmar	—	—	—	—	—	17th	—	—	—	1
Nepal	GS	GS	SF	2nd	5th	4th	4th	2nd	1st	9
Oman	—	—	—	GS	2nd	11th	—	6th	6th	5
Papua New Guinea	SF	GS	—	—	—	—	—	—	—	2
Qatar	—	—	—	GS	4th	8th	9th	—	—	4
Saudi Arabia	—	—	—	—	GS	10th	10th	—	9th	4
Singapore	GS	GS	GS	GS	GS	5th	5th	9th	—	8
Thailand	GS	GS	—	GS	GS	12th	—	—	—	5
United Arab Emirates	2nd	SF	1st	1st	1st	1st	2nd	5th	1st	9

- Note: the above table includes results in all top-flight ACC tournaments – the ACC Trophy from 1996 to 2006, and the ACC Trophy Elite from 2008 to 2012,
- Teams in italics no longer compete in ACC Trophy/ACC Trophy Elite matches, either through having gained Test status (Bangladesh and Afghanistan), or through having moved to the ICC East Asia-Pacific region (Fiji, Japan, and Papua New Guinea).

== Champions and runners-up ==
Team	Champions	Runner up
United Arab Emirates	5	2
Bangladesh	2	0
Nepal	1	2
Hong Kong	1	2
Afghanistan	1	0
Oman	0	1
Malaysia	0	1

Notes: Bangladesh gained full Test status in 2000 and are no longer eligible to participate in the ACC Trophy.

== See also ==
- Asia Cup
- ACC Premier Cup
- ACC Twenty20 Cup
- ACC Premier League
