= Singapore national cricket team =

Men's cricket team

Singapore
- Flag of Singapore
- Association: Singapore Cricket Association

Personnel
- Captain: Manpreet Singh
- Coach: Amjad Mahboob

International Cricket Council
- ICC status: Associate member (1974)
- ICC region: Asia
ICC Rankings	Current	Best-ever
T20I	42nd	19th (20 Oct 2019)

One Day Internationals
- World Cup Qualifier appearances: 6 (first in 1979)
- Best result: 14th (1997)

T20 Internationals
- First T20I: v Qatar at Indian Association Ground, Singapore; 22 July 2019
- Last T20I: v Malaysia at Bayuemas Oval, Pandamaran; 12 October 2026
T20Is	Played	Won/Lost
Total	85	33/49 (1 tie, 2 no results)
This year	11	6/5 (0 ties, 0 no results)
- T20 World Cup Qualifier appearances: 3 (Note: For the 2024 and 2026 Men's T20 World Cups, the final round of qualification in Asia was the ICC Asia Regional Final.) (first in 2019)
- Best result: 8th (2022)
List A & T20I kit
- As of 12 October 2026

The Singapore national cricket team represents Singapore in international cricket. Singapore has been an associate member of the International Cricket Council (ICC) since 1974, and was a founding member of the Asian Cricket Council formed in 1983.

The Singapore Cricket Club was established in 1837 during the colonial period. Singapore played regular fixtures against other British colonies in Asia beginning in the late 19th century, notably participating in the interport matches. It later contributed players to combined teams representing the Straits Settlements and Malaya. After gaining ICC membership, Singapore played in six out of the first seven editions of the ICC Trophy, beginning in 1979. Post-independence, its greatest rivalry has been with neighbouring Malaysia, in the annual Stan Nagaiah Trophy. Singapore reached as high as Division Three of the World Cricket League. The team made its Twenty20 International debut in 2019, following the granting of that status to associate members of the ICC, and in the same year participated in the ICC Men's T20 World Cup Qualifier for the first time.

== History ==
=== Beginnings of cricket in Singapore ===
The first recorded mention of cricket in Singapore was in 1837 when a "Mr Z" complained, in a letter to the Singapore Free Press, of cricket being played near a church on a Sunday in violation of the Christian Sabbath. This resulted in cricket being banned on Sundays, a prohibition that remained in place until the 1930s.

Cricket was an important recreational activity, with matches often played against the officers of visiting ships. The Singapore Cricket Club was formed in 1852 and played their first match amongst themselves the same year. The quality of cricket in these early years was quite poor, and it wasn't until 1865 before a team total of more than 100 was scored. Louis Glass became the first person in Singapore to record a century two years later.

The Singapore Cricket Club eventually began to play against teams from other parts of British Malaya such as Penang, Perak and Kuala Lumpur and this eventually led to an invitation from Hong Kong to send a team there, which saw the beginning of the long-running series of "Interport matches".

=== Straits Settlements cricket team ===
The 1890 invitation from Hong Kong led to the formation of the Straits Settlements cricket team, and they played Hong Kong in two two-day matches, both of which were lost. The series was the beginning of the "Interport Matches", which continued until 1987. Hong Kong and Ceylon came to Singapore the following year, and the Straits Settlements won both matches, also drawing against a combined Ceylon/Hong Kong team.

The Straits Settlements team beat Ceylon in Colombo in 1893, and played a match in Jakarta in 1895. Matches against the Federated Malay States began in 1896, and against Shanghai in 1897.

They played Burma in 1906, and their involvement in the Interport Matches ceased in 1909, when they were replaced by an All Malaya team. The Straits Settlements visited Bangkok in 1910, though from them their only matches came annually against the Federated Malay States until 1940. These fixtures continue in the modern era as the Saudara Cup matches between Singapore and Malaysia.

=== Singapore team ===
==== First matches ====
The Singapore team did play twice during the Straits Settlements team era, playing twice against WAS Oldfield's XI in 1927, losing both matches by an innings. They next played in 1957, drawing at home to Ceylon. Various teams visited Singapore in the 1960s, including Worcestershire.

The Interport Matches resumed in 1968 with Singapore drawing against Hong Kong. These matches were played occasionally until 1987. In 1970, the Saudara Cup match against Malaysia was played for the first time, this continues annually to the present day. Also that year, Singapore played an MCC side captain by Tony Lewis and featuring Geoff Boycott. The match was won by the MCC.

==== ICC membership ====
Singapore became an associate member of the ICC in 1974 and three years later won the Saudara Cup for the first time. In 1978, Singapore played India at home, the match ending in a draw. Singapore took part in the first ICC Trophy in England in 1979 but could only finish fourth in their first round group after only beating Argentina. They finished fourth out of eight teams in their first round group in the 1982 tournament and withdrew from the 1986 tournament when several of their players couldn't get leave from work.

Singapore played in the South East Asian Tournament for the first time in 1984, playing in the event again in 1988 and 1992 (when they hosted), though they never reached the final as Bangladesh and Hong Kong finished first and second on each occasion. The final Interport Match took place in Singapore in 1987, with Hong Kong beating the home side. They returned to the ICC Trophy for the 1990 tournament in the Netherlands, beating Malaysia and Israel during the event, and failing to progress past the first round.

Singapore began playing in the Tuanku Ja'afar Cup in 1991, an annual tournament against Malaysia, Hong Kong and Thailand. They won the event just once, in 1994, a year in which they finished 19th out of 20 teams in the ICC Trophy. The Stan Nagaiah Trophy, an annual three match series of one-day matches against Malaysia, began the following year. Singapore played in the first ACC Trophy in 1996, beating the Maldives and Thailand but failing to go past the first round. They finished 14th in the 1997 ICC Trophy and could only beat Papua New Guinea in the 1998 ACC Trophy, again failing to go past the first round.

=== 21st century ===
==== 2000–2017 ====
The first two major tournaments of the 21st century for Singapore got them off to a bad start as they lost all their first round matches in both the 2000 ACC Trophy in the UAE and the 2001 ICC Trophy in Ontario, their final ICC Trophy to date. They hosted the ACC Trophy in 2002, beating the Maldives and Thailand (by 325 runs) but again failing to progress beyond the first round, a performance they repeated in 2004. The finished fourth in the ACC Fast Track Countries Tournament in 2004 and 2005.

Singapore began to show an improvement in their form in 2006. That year they finished third in the ACC Premier League and finally passed the first round stage in the ACC Trophy, finishing fifth to qualify for Division Five of the World Cricket League in 2008. They didn't progress beyond the first round of the 2007 ACC Twenty20 Cup, beating only Hong Kong and Saudi Arabia, but captain Chaminda Ruwan did make the highest score of the tournament. In the World Cricket League Division Five tournament in Jersey, Singapore finished fifth after beating Botswana in a play-off, though they did beat Afghanistan during the first round, who went on to win the tournament.

In August 2009, Singapore hosted and won Division Six of the World Cricket League, going through the tournament undefeated and winning promotion back to Division Five. In November 2009, Singapore travelled to the UAE for the 2009 ACC Twenty20 Cup. During the tournament Singapore finished third in Group A, therefore failing to progress to the semi-finals and a chance to qualify for the 2010 Asian Games. In the fifth place playoff Singapore lost to Nepal by 9 wickets to finish to tournament in sixth place.

In the 2010 ICC World Cricket League Division Five, they finished fourth to remain in Division Five. Hosting the 2012 tournament, they ran out winners, moving them up to Division Four and keeping their hopes of World Cup qualification alive. Singapore has decided to dedicate their strengths in to their SEA GAMES team, where Mohammad Yusof Bin Aslam (Captain) has chosen not to participate due to conflict of interest.

In August 2017, Singapore won two medals in cricket at the 2017 Southeast Asian Games. They won the gold medal in the 20-over tournament and the silver medal in the 50-over tournament. On 26 April 2018, ICC stated in a press release that all the men's T20 matches between ICC members will have T20I status from 1 January 2019.

==== 2018–present ====
In April 2018, the ICC decided to grant full Twenty20 International (T20I) status to all its members. Therefore, all Twenty20 matches played between Singapore and other ICC members after 1 January 2019 have the full T20I status.

Singapore played their first T20I against Qatar on 22 July 2019. On 28 July 2019, after their victory against Nepal in the regional finals of the 2018–19 ICC T20 World Cup Asia Qualifier; Singapore qualified for the ICC T20 World Cup Qualifier for the first time.

22 July 2019
10:00
Scorecard

Singapore; 186/7 (20 overs)	v	Qatar; 153/9 (20 overs)
Surendran Chandramohan 47 (39); Iqbal Hussain 4/33 (4 overs)		Tamoor Sajjad 34 (29); Janak Prakash 3/15 (4 overs)

Singapore won by 33 runs
Indian Association Ground, Singapore
Umpires: Viswanadan Kalidas (Mas) and Buddhi Pradhan (Nep)
Player of the match: Janak Prakash (Sin)

- Singapore won the toss and elected to bat.
- First ever T20I match for Singapore.

After April 2019, Singapore will play in the 2019–21 ICC Cricket World Cup Challenge League.

In September 2019, Singapore beat Zimbabwe by four runs in the third T20I match of the 2019–20 Singapore Tri-Nation Series. It was the first time that Singapore had beaten a Full Member team in an international cricket match.

29 September 2019
19:30 (D/N)
Scorecard

Singapore; 181/9 (18 overs)	v	Zimbabwe; 177/7 (18 overs)
Manpreet Singh 41 (23); Ryan Burl 3/24 (3 overs)		Sean Williams 66 (35); Amjad Mahboob 2/20 (4 overs)

Singapore won by 4 runs
Indian Association Ground, Singapore
Umpires: Akbar Ali (UAE) and Balraj Manikandan (Sin)
Player of the match: Sean Williams (Zim)

- Singapore's first victory against a Full Member.

== Grounds ==
Locations of all stadiums which have hosted an international cricket match within Singapore

== Tournament history ==
Legend

- Champions
- Runners-up
- Third place/Semi-finals
- Hosts
- Q Qualified/Advanced to next stage
- DNQ Did not qualify
- ▲ Promoted
- Remained in the same division
- ▼ Relegated

=== Cricket World Cup ===
Cricket World Cup record								Qualification record				
Year	Round	Position	Pld	W	L	T	NR	Pld	W	L	T	NR
(England) 1975	Not invited							No qualifiers held				
(England) 1979	Did not qualify							4	1	2	0	1
(England) (Wales) 1983	Did not qualify							7	1	2	0	4
(India) (Pakistan) 1987	Did not qualify							Withdrew				
(Australia) (New Zealand) 1992	Did not qualify							6	2	4	0	0
(India) (Pakistan) (Sri Lanka) 1996	Did not qualify							7	1	5	0	1
(England) (Wales) (Scotland) (Republic of Ireland) (Netherlands) 1999	Did not qualify							7	3	4	0	0
(South Africa) (Zimbabwe) (Kenya) 2003	Did not qualify							5	0	5	0	0
(Cricket West Indies) 2007	Did not qualify							3	1	2	0	0
(India) (Sri Lanka) (Bangladesh) 2011	Did not qualify							7	5	1	0	1
(Australia) (New Zealand) 2015	Did not qualify							24	19	5	0	0
(England) (Wales) 2019	Did not qualify							18	10	7	0	1
(India) 2023	Did not qualify							15	7	8	0	0
(South Africa) (Namibia) (Zimbabwe) 2027	Did not qualify							15	0	14	0	1
Total	—N/a	0/14	–	–	–	–	–	118	50	59	0	9

=== Cricket World Cup Qualifier ===
Cricket World Cup Qualifier record
Year	Round	Position	Pld	W	L	T	NR	Qual.
(England) 1979	Group stage	11/15	4	1	2	0	1	DNQ
(England) 1982	Group stage	10/16	7	1	2	0	4	DNQ
(England) 1986	Withdrew							
(Netherlands) 1990	Plate round	12/17	6	2	4	0	0	DNQ
(Kenya) 1994	Wooden spoon round	19/20	7	1	5	0	1	DNQ
(Malaysia) 1997	Plate round	14/22	6	3	3	0	0	DNQ
(Canada) 2001	Group stage	12/24	5	0	5	0	0	DNQ
(Ireland) 2005 – 2027	Did not qualify							
Total	0 Titles	6/13	35	8	21	0	6	—N/a

=== CWC Challenge League ===
Cricket World Cup Challenge League record
Year	League	Position	Pld	W	L	T	NR	P/R
2019–2022	A	4/6	15	7	8	0	0	Same position
2024–2026	B	6/6	15	0	14	0	1	▼
Total	0 Titles	2/2	30	7	22	0	1	—N/a

=== Men's T20 World Cup ===
Men's T20 World Cup record								Qualification record				
Year	Round	Position	Pld	W	L	T	NR	Pld	W	L	T	NR
(South Africa) 2007	Not eligible							Not eligible				
(England) 2009	Not eligible							Not eligible				
(Cricket West Indies) 2010	Not eligible							Not eligible				
(Sri Lanka) 2012	Did not enter							Did not enter				
(Bangladesh) 2014	Did not qualify							4	0	4	0	0
(India) 2016	Did not qualify							5	2	3	0	0
(United Arab Emirates) (Oman) 2021	Did not qualify							16	10	4	0	2
(Australia) 2022	Did not qualify							5	0	5	0	0
(United States) (Cricket West Indies) 2024	Did not qualify							3	0	3	0	0
(India) (Sri Lanka) 2026	Did not qualify							6	4	2	0	0
(Australia) (New Zealand) 2028	Did not qualify							5	2	3	0	0
Total	—N/a	0/10	–	–	–	–	–	44	18	24	0	2

=== T20 World Cup Global Qualifier ===
Men's T20 World Cup Qualifier record
Year	Round	Position	Pld	W	L	T	NR	Qual.
(Ireland) 2008	Not eligible							
(United Arab Emirates) 2010	Not eligible							
(United Arab Emirates) 2012	Did not enter							
(United Arab Emirates) 2013	Did not qualify							
(Ireland) (Scotland) 2015	Did not qualify							
(United Arab Emirates) 2019	Group stage	12/14	6	2	4	0	0	DNQ
(Zimbabwe) 2022	Play-offs	8/8	5	0	5	0	0	DNQ
(To be determined) 2028	Did not qualify							
Total	0 Titles	2/8	11	2	9	0	0	—N/a

=== T20 World Cup Asia Regional Final ===
T20 World Cup Asia Regional Final record
Year	Round	Position	Pld	W	L	T	NR	Qual.
(Singapore) 2019	Champions	1/5	4	3	0	0	1	Q
(Nepal) 2023	Round-robin	8/8	3	0	3	0	0	DNQ
(Oman) 2025	Did not qualify							
(To be determined) 2027	Did not qualify							
Total	1 Title	2/4	7	3	3	0	1	—N/a

=== Asian Games ===
Cricket at the Asian Games record
Year	Round	Position	Pld	W	L	T	NR
(China) 2010	Withdrew						
(South Korea) 2014	Did not qualify						
(China) 2022	Preliminary round	9/12	2	1	1	0	0
(Japan) 2026	Did not qualify						
Total	1/4	0 Titles	2	1	1	0	0

=== Southeast Asian Games ===
Cricket at the SEA Games record
Year	Format	Round	Position	Pld	W	L	T	NR
(Malaysia) 2017	T20	Gold medal	1/6	3	3	0	0	0
(Malaysia) 2017	50 over	Silver medal	2/5	4	3	1	0	0
(Cambodia) 2023	6s	Gold medal	1/4	3	2	1	0	0
(Cambodia) 2023	T10	Bronze medal	3/6	3	2	1	0	0
(Cambodia) 2023	T20	Bronze medal	3/6	3	2	1	0	0
(Cambodia) 2023	50 over	Did not participate						
(Thailand) 2025	T10	Bronze medal	3/5	4	2	2	0	0
(Thailand) 2025	T20	Bronze medal	3/5	4	2	2	0	0
Total		3/3	2 Titles	24	16	8	0	0

=== Other global tournaments ===
CWC Challenge League (List A)	World Cricket League (LA/ODI/50 overs)
2019–22 (A): 4th place; 2024–26 (B): 6th place (▼)	2008 (Division Five) : 5th place (▼); 2009 (Division Six) : Winners (▲); 2010 (Division Five) : 4th place; 2012 (Division Five) : Winners (▲); 2012 (Division Four) : 3rd place; 2014 (Division Four) : Runners-up (▲); 2014 (Division Three) : 4th place; 2017 (Division Three) : 3rd place; 2018 (Division Three) : 3rd place

=== Other regional tournaments ===
T20WC Asia Sub-regional Qualifiers (T20I)	Premier Cup/Asia Cup Qualifier (OD/T20I)	ACC Challenger Cup (50 overs/T20I)	ACC Twenty20 Cup
2018: Runners-up (Q); 2024: 4th place (DNQ); 2026: 4th place (DNQ)	2018: 6th place (DNQ); 2022: 4th place (DNQ); 2023: 10th place (DNQ); 2026: 10th place (DNQ)	2024: 3rd place; 2026: Runners-up	2007: First round; 2009: 6th place; 2011: Did not participate; 2013: 9th place; 2015: 4th place
ACC Trophy	ACC Trophy Elite	ACC Eastern Region T20	ACC Fast Track Countries Tournament
1996: First round; 1998: First round; 2000: First round; 2002: First round; 2004: First round; 2006: 5th place	2008: 5th place; 2010: 9th place	2020: Winners – Advanced to the Qualifier	2004: 4th place; 2005: 4th place; 2006: 3rd place

== Current squad ==
This lists all the active players who have played for the Singapore in the past 12 months and the forms in which they have played, or any players who have been selected in the team's most recent One-day or T20I squad. Players uncapped for the Singapore national team are listed in italics.

Updated as on 8 August 2026.

Name	Age	Batting style	Bowling style	Formats	Notes
Batsmen
Mahiyu Bhatia	20	Right-handed	Right-arm off break	One-day & T20I	Vice-captain
Suryansh Gulecha	21	Right-handed	—N/a	One-day & T20I	
Aritra Dutta	35	Right-handed	—N/a	One-day & T20I	
Rezza Gaznavi	34	Right-handed	Right-arm leg break	T20I	
Riaan Naik	17	Right-handed	—N/a	One-day & T20I	
Girin Gune	22	Right-handed	Right-arm legbreak	One-day & T20I	
Hari Kukreja	26	Right-handed	Right-arm fast	One-day & T20I	
Mason Arthur Sherry	19	Right-handed	—N/a	One-day & T20I	
Aaron Varghese	22	Right-handed	—N/a	T20I	
All-rounders
Manpreet Singh	32	Right-handed	Right-arm off break	One-day & T20I	Captain; occasional wicket-keeper
Harsh Venkataram	18	Right-handed	Right-arm medium	One-day & T20I	
Kabir Berlia	18	Right-handed	Right-arm medium	One-day & T20I	
Harman Singh	—N/a	Right-handed	Right-arm medium	One-day	
Ishaan Swaney	25	Left-handed	Slow left-arm orthodox	T20I	
Umair Aftab	34	Right-handed	Right-arm fast	One-day	
Raoul Sharma	23	Right-handed	Right-arm medium	T20I	
Aslan Jafri	19	Left-handed	Slow left-arm orthodox	T20I	
Kannusami Sathish	24	Right-handed	Left-arm medium	T20I	
Wicket-keepers
Aman Desai	24	Left-handed	—N/a	T20I	
Raheel Thakkar	19	Right-handed	—N/a	One-day	
Sai Venugopal	24	Right-handed	—N/a	T20I	
Pratham Somani	20	Right-handed	—N/a	T20I	
Spin bowlers
Jeevan Santhanam	21	Left-handed	Slow left-arm orthodox	One-day & T20I	
Daksh Tyagi	19	Right-handed	Right-arm legbreak	T20I	
Harsha Bharadwaj	19	Right-handed	Right-arm legbreak	T20I	
Vedant Nagpaul	18	Left-handed	Right-arm off break	T20I	
Pace bowlers
Aarkin Kessar	18	Right-handed	Right-arm medium	One-day & T20I	
Neil Karnik	22	Right-handed	Right-arm medium	T20I	
Venkatesan Thiyanesh	21	Right-handed	Right-arm medium-fast	T20I	
Kapish Venkatraman	17	Right-handed	Right-arm medium	T20I	
Pranav Sudarshan	23	Right-handed	Right-arm medium	One-day & T20I	

== Records and statistics ==
International Match Summary — Singapore

Last updated 12 October 2026

Playing Record
Format	M	W	L	T	NR	Inaugural Match
Twenty20 Internationals	85	33	49	1	2	22 July 2019

=== Twenty20 International ===
- Highest team total: 239/3 v. Malaysia on 3 March 2020 at Terdthai Cricket Ground, Bangkok.
- Highest individual score: 122, Aritra Dutta v. Japan on 11 February 2024 at Terdthai Cricket Ground, Bangkok.
- Best individual bowling figures: 6/3, Harsha Bharadwaj v. Mongolia on 5 September 2024 at UKM-YSD Cricket Oval, Bangi.

Most T20I runs for Singapore

Player	Runs	Average	Career span
Manpreet Singh	1,539	27.00	2019–2026
Surendran Chandramohan	1,292	25.84	2019–2026
Aritra Dutta	712	19.77	2019–2025
Janak Prakash	588	20.27	2019–2024
Aman Desai	577	15.59	2022–2025

Most T20I wickets for Singapore

Player	Wickets	Average	Career span
Janak Prakash	48	26.97	2019–2024
Amjad Mahboob	40	21.07	2019–2023
Akshay Puri	30	33.86	2022–2026
Vinoth Baskaran	29	27.00	2019–2022
Harsh Venkataram	27	17.96	2025–2026

T20I record versus other nations

Records complete to T20I #4189. Last updated 12 October 2026.

Opponent	M	W	L	T	NR	First match	First win
Test nations
Zimbabwe	3	1	2	0	0	29 September 2019	29 September 2019
Associate Members
Bahrain	7	0	5	1	1	16 December 2022	
Bermuda	1	1	0	0	0	20 October 2019	20 October 2019
Cambodia	2	0	2	0	0	4 May 2023	
China	1	1	0	0	0	11 October 2026	11 October 2026
Hong Kong	7	1	6	0	0	4 March 2020	4 March 2020
Indonesia	3	3	0	0	0	11 May 2023	11 May 2023
Japan	2	2	0	0	0	6 February 2024	6 February 2024
Jersey	2	0	2	0	0	14 July 2022	
Kenya	1	0	1	0	0	23 October 2019	
Kuwait	2	1	1	0	0	24 August 2022	6 September 2024
Malaysia	16	3	12	0	1	26 July 2019	26 July 2019
Maldives	3	3	0	0	0	2 February 2024	2 February 2024
Mongolia	1	1	0	0	0	5 September 2024	5 September 2024
Myanmar	1	1	0	0	0	9 September 2024	9 September 2024
Namibia	1	0	1	0	0	26 October 2019	
Nepal	3	1	2	0	0	28 July 2019	28 July 2019
Netherlands	1	0	1	0	0	22 October 2019	
Oman	2	0	2	0	0	31 October 2023	
Papua New Guinea	3	1	2	0	0	25 October 2019	2 July 2022
Philippines	2	1	1	0	0	3 May 2023	3 May 2023
Qatar	4	1	3	0	0	22 July 2019	22 July 2019
Samoa	2	2	0	0	0	18 July 2025	18 July 2025
Saudi Arabia	3	0	3	0	0	25 April 2025	
Scotland	1	1	0	0	0	18 October 2019	18 October 2019
Thailand	8	7	1	0	0	29 February 2020	29 February 2020
United Arab Emirates	1	0	1	0	0	22 August 2022	
United States	1	0	1	0	0	12 July 2022	
Uzbekistan	1	1	0	0	0	22 June 2026	22 June 2026

== Other records and statistics ==
=== Twenty20 Matches ===
Statistics from Singapore players in World Cricket League matches and ACC Events since 2008

=== Highest scores ===
- Arjun Mutreja – 108 vs Bermuda at Selangor Turf Club, Kuala Lumpur on 27 October 2014
- Christopher Janik – 106 vs Malaysia at Kinrara Academy Oval, Kuala Lumpur on 4 September 2012
- Buddhika Mendis – 103* vs Bahrain at The Padang, Singapore on 1 September 2009
- Arjun Mutreja – 101* vs United States of America at Kampala, Uganda on 26 May 2017

=== Best bowling figures ===
- Mulewa Dharmichand – 6/55 vs Guernsey at The Padang, Singapore on 29 August 2009
- Christopher Janik – 5/9 vs Afghanistan at FB Fields, St Clement on 27 May 2008
- Abhiraj Singh – 5/12 vs Tanzania at Selangor Turf Club, Kuala Lumpur on 7 September 2012
- Abhiraj Singh – 5/42 vs Kuwait at Kallang Ground, Singapore on 8 June 2014
- Mohammad Ali – 5/45 vs Hong Kong at Royal Military College, Kuala Lumpur on 30 July 2008
- Chaminda Ruwan – 5/46 vs Qatar at Bayuemas Oval, Kuala Lumpur on 25 July 2008

=== ICC Trophy ===
- Highest team total: 231/6 v Gibraltar, 25 February 1994 at Ruaraka Sports Club Ground, Nairobi
- Highest individual score: 77 by Joshua Dearing v Canada, 28 June 2001 at Toronto Cricket, Skating and Curling Club
- Best innings bowling: 5/39 by M. Rajalingam v Fiji, 5 July 1982 at Solihull Cricket Club Ground

=== Overall ===
- Highest team total: 440/2 v Thailand, 16 July 2002 at Kallang Ground, Singapore
- Highest individual score: 191 by K Mendis v Thailand, 16 July 2002 at Kallang Ground, Singapore
- Best innings bowling: 8/8 by Mahesh Mehta v Malaysia, 14 September 1979 at The Padang, Malaysia

== See also ==
- List of Singapore Twenty20 International cricketers
- Singapore women's national cricket team
