= ACC Twenty20 Cup =

Asian Cricket Council Twenty20 Cup
- Administrator: Asian Cricket Council
- Format: 20-over
- First edition: 2007
- Latest edition: 2015
- Tournament format: Round-robin and knockout (2007–2013); Round-robin (2015)
- Number of teams: 8 (2015)
- Current champion: Oman (2nd title)
- Most successful: Afghanistan (4 titles)
- Qualification: ICC World Twenty20 Qualifier

The ACC Twenty20 Cup was a 20-over cricket tournament organised by the Asian Cricket Council (ACC). The tournament did not include the ACC members who were full members of the International Cricket Council (ICC) during the years in which it was held (Bangladesh, India, Pakistan, and Sri Lanka), instead featuring the best associate and affiliate members. Matches at the tournament were not accorded official Twenty20 or Twenty20 International status.

The inaugural ACC Twenty20 Cup in 2007 was jointly won by Afghanistan and Oman. From 2011, the tournament has been part of the qualification process for the ICC World Twenty20. The four top-ranked teams at the 2011 and 2013 tournaments qualified for the next World Twenty20 Qualifier. At the 2013 Qualifier (for the 2014 main tournament), the four ACC teams all gained Twenty20 International status and automatic qualification for the 2015 Qualifier (for the 2016 main tournament). Consequently, those teams were excluded from the 2015 ACC Twenty20 Cup, with only the winner (Oman) qualifying for the 2015 World Twenty20 Qualifierr.

== 2007 ACC Twenty20 Cup ==
The 2007 tournament took place from 27 October until 2 November in Kuwait. Ten teams participated in the tournament.

The final between Afghanistan and Oman was tied after 20 overs each. Tournament regulations stated that a Bowl-out was to be used in the event of a tie, but due to the poor condition of the pitch after the match, it was cancelled and the trophy shared.

== 2009 ACC Twenty20 Cup ==
A second tournament was held in November 2009, featuring all but the bottom two teams from the 2007 tournament. The cricket team from Afghanistan was the winner again. The top three teams from the 2009 tournament joined Bangladesh, Pakistan and Sri Lanka for the cricket tournament at the 2010 Asian Games.

== 2011 ACC Twenty20 Cup ==
A third tournament was held in December 2011, featuring ten teams. The cricket team from Afghanistan was the winner for the third time. The top three teams from the 2011 tournament will head to the UAE to participate in the 2012 ICC World Twenty20 Qualifier.

== 2013 ACC Twenty20 Cup ==
A fourth tournament was held between March 26- April 3 in Nepal, featuring ten teams. The cricket team from Afghanistan was the winner for the fourth time. Nepal, Hong Kong qualified for the 2013 ICC World Twenty20 Qualifier in addition to Afghanistan as an ODI nation and UAE as hosts.

== 2015 ACC Twenty20 Cup ==
The 2015 edition of the tournament was held in the United Arab Emirates in early 2015. The tournament, won by Oman, served as a qualifying tournament for the 2015 ICC World Twenty20 Qualifier, held in Ireland and Scotland from 9 to 26 July2015.Afghanistan, Hong Kong, Nepal and the United Arab Emirates did not play in the tournament as their T20I status had already placed them in the 2015 World Twenty20 Qualifier.

== Results summary ==
ACC Twenty20 Cup
Year	Host	Final venue	Champion	Runner-up	Third place	Fourth place
2007	Kuwait	KOC Cricket Ground, Kuwait City	Afghanistan; Oman (tied)	no runner up	Kuwait	UAE
2009	UAE	Sheikh Zayed Cricket Stadium, Abu Dhabi	Afghanistan	UAE	Oman	Kuwait
2011	Nepal	Tribhuvan University Ground, Kirtipur	Afghanistan	Hong Kong	Oman	Nepal
2013	Nepal	Tribhuvan University Ground, Kirtipur	Afghanistan	Nepal	UAE	Hong Kong
2015	UAE	no final played	Oman	Kuwait	Saudi Arabia	Singapore

== Participating teams ==
Legend

- 1st – Champions
- 2nd – Runners-up
- 3rd – Third place
- Q – Qualified
- * – Team was ineligible for tournament
- — Hosts

Team	(Kuwait) 2007	(United Arab Emirates) 2009	(Nepal) 2011	(Nepal) 2013	(United Arab Emirates) 2015	Total
Afghanistan	1st	1st	1st	1st	*	4
Bahrain	—	11th	—	10th	—	2
Bhutan	—	—	9th	—	—	1
China	—	12th	—	—	—	1
Hong Kong	8th	10th	2nd	4th	*	4
Kuwait	3rd	4th	7th	5th	2nd	5
Malaysia	10th	7th	6th	6th	5th	5
Maldives	—	—	8th	8th	6th	3
Nepal	7th	5th	4th	2nd	*	4
Oman	1st	3rd	3rd	7th	1st	5
Qatar	6th	9th	—	—	—	2
Saudi Arabia	9th	8th	10th	—	3rd	4
Singapore	5th	6th	—	9th	4th	4
United Arab Emirates	4th	2nd	5th	3rd	*	4

== See also ==
- ACC Premier Cup
- ACC Championship
- ICC World Twenty20 Qualifier
