= Mohammed Aslam (Kuwaiti cricketer) =

Sri Lanka born Kuwaiti cricketer (born 1990)

Personal information
- Full name: Mohammed Nowfer Mohomad Aslam
- Born: 27 July 1990 (age 36); Kalubowila, Sri Lanka
- Batting: Right-handed
- Bowling: Slow left-arm
- Role: Batsman

International information
- National side: Kuwait
- T20I debut (cap 15): 4 July 2019 v Qatar
- Last T20I: 8 October 2023 v Thailand
- Source: Cricinfo, 21 September 2023

Mohammad Aslam Mohammad Nawfer (born 27 July 1990), known as Mohammed Aslam, is a Sri Lankan cricketer who now plays for Kuwait national cricket team.

== Early life and education ==
Mohammad Aslam Mohammad Nawfer was born on 27 July 1990 in Kalubowila, Sri Lanka.

He attended Lumbini College in Colombo.

== Career ==
Aslam made his first-class debut for Saracens Sports Club in the 2010–11 Premier Trophy on 25 March 2011.

He made his Twenty20 International (T20I) debut for Kuwait against Qatar on 4 July 2019. In March 2021, he retained the captaincy of the Kuwait cricket team. In October 2021, he was named as the captain of Kuwait's squad for the Group A matches in the 2021 ICC Men's T20 World Cup Asia Qualifier.

Aslam captained the Kuwait team in the 2023 ICC Men's T20 World Cup Asia Qualifier tournament, in which the team progressed to the regional final in Nepal, and again for the 2025 tournament, when Kuwait, along with Malaysia, advance to ICC Men's T20 WC Asia-East Asia Pacific Regional Final in September 2024.
