= Ravija Sandaruwan =

Kuwaiti cricketer

Personal information
- Full name: Bodadura Ravija Sandaruwan de Silva
- Born: 22 June 1992 (age 34); Colombo, Sri Lanka
- Batting: Right-handed
- Bowling: Right-arm Off break
- Role: Batsman

International information
- National side: Kuwait (2019–present)
- T20I debut (cap 9): 20 January 2019 v Maldives
- Last T20I: 8 October 2026 v Thailand

Domestic team information
- Years: Team
- 2012–2013: Saracens Sports Club
- 2022: Badureliya Sports Club

Career statistics
Competition	T20I	FC	LA	T20
Matches	71	4	19	79
Runs scored	1907	54	478	2085
Batting average	28.04	7.71	25.15	27.43
100s/50s	2/11	0/0	0/4	2/12
Top score	103	30	67	103
Balls bowled	0	36	0	0
Wickets	0	1	0	0
Bowling average	–	40.00	–	–
5 wickets in innings	0	0	0	0
10 wickets in match	0	0	0	0
Best bowling	–	1/40	–	–
Catches/stumpings	16/–	4/–	9/–	18/–
- Source: Cricinfo, 21 March 2025

Ravija Sandaruwan (born 22 June 1992) is a Sri Lankan-born cricketer who plays for the Kuwait national cricket team. He made his List A debut for Saracens Sports Club in the 2012–13 Premier Limited Overs Tournament in Sri Lanka on 27 December 2012. He made his first-class debut, also for Saracens Sports Club, in the 2012–13 Premier League Tournament on 30 March 2013.

In April 2018, he represented Kuwait in Western sub-region group of the 2018–19 ICC World Twenty20 Asia Qualifier tournament, playing in all six matches. In his Twenty20 International (T20I) debut against the Maldives on 20 January 2019 in the 2019 ACC Western Region T20 tournament, Sandaruwan was named the player of the match for his unbeaten innings of 68 in 36 balls. Three days later, in the match against Bahrain, he scored 103 runs from 59 balls, and was again named the player of the match. He was the leading run-scorer in the tournament, with 177 runs in four matches.

In June 2019, he was named in Kuwait's T20I squad for their series against Qatar. In October 2021, he was named in Kuwait's squad for the Group A matches in the 2021 ICC Men's T20 World Cup Asia Qualifier.
