= Kuwait national cricket team =

Kuwait
- Association: Cricket Kuwait

Personnel
- Captain: Mohammed Aslam
- Coach: Kabir Khan

International Cricket Council
- ICC status: Affiliate (1998); Associate member (2005)
- ICC region: Asia
ICC Rankings	Current	Best-ever
T20I	27th	23rd (13-April-2025)

International cricket
- First international: v Bahrain at Kuwait City; 30 October 1979

T20 Internationals
- First T20I: v Maldives at Oman Cricket Academy Ground Turf 1, Al Amarat; 20 January 2019
- Last T20I: v Bhutan at Selangor Turf Club, Kuala Lumpur; 12 October 2026
T20Is	Played	Won/Lost
Total	88	49/35 (3 ties, 1 no result)
This year	9	6/3 (0 ties, 0 no results)
- T20 World Cup Qualifier appearances: 1 (Note: For the 2024 and 2026 Men's T20 World Cups, the final round of qualification in Asia was the ICC Asia Regional Final.) (first in 2023)
- Best result: Group stage (2023)
List A & T20I kit
- As of 12 October 2026

The Kuwait national cricket team is the team that represents Kuwait in international cricket. The team is organised by Cricket Kuwait, which has been an associate member of the International Cricket Council (ICC) since 2005, having previously been an affiliate member since 1998. Kuwait made its international debut in 1979, but has only played regularly at international level since the early 2000s, appearing regularly in Asian Cricket Council tournaments since then. Beginning in the early 2010s, the side appeared in several World Cricket League events, although it was relegated back to regional level after the 2013 Division Six tournament.

== History ==
The Kuwait Cricket Association was formed in 1996 and they became an affiliate member of the ICC two years later.

=== 21st century ===
==== 2000 – 2017 ====
They participated in the ACC Trophy for the first time in 2000, but couldn't progress beyond the first round, a performance they repeated in the 2002 tournament.

In 2004, Kuwait pulled off a series off upsets to finish in third place in that year's ACC Trophy, only just missing out on qualification for the 2005 ICC Trophy. They did qualify for the repêchage tournament in early 2005 in Kuala Lumpur, Malaysia, in which they finished sixth after losing to the Cayman Islands in a play-off.

In February 2006, Kuwait finished third out of five teams when they hosted the ACC Middle East Cup. In August, they took part in the ACC Trophy, but were unable to reproduce their strong 2004 performance. They were eliminated in the first round when a tie with Hong Kong left them in third place in their group on run rate. A win in this match would have seen them through to the quarter finals.

In 2007 Kuwait played in the ACC Twenty20 Cup, which they also hosted. They finished third in the tournament, beating the UAE by three runs in a play-off.

Kuwait has participated in several World Cricket League tournaments, hosting and winning Division Eight in 2010; winning Division Seven in Botswana in May 2011; and coming third in Division Six in Malaysia in September 2011. Kuwait set one of the lowest ever T20 targets during the 2014 Asian Games.

=== 2018–Present ===
In April 2018, the ICC decided to grant full Twenty20 International (T20I) status to all its members. Therefore, all Twenty20 matches played between Kuwait and other ICC members after 1 January 2019 have the full T20I status.

Kuwait made its Twenty20 International debut on 20 January 2019, defeating Maldives by eight wickets in the 2019 ACC Western Region T20 at Al Emarat Cricket Stadium, Muscat, Oman.

20 January 2019
09:30
Scorecard

Maldives; 102 (18.4 overs)	v	Kuwait; 103/2 (10.3 overs)
Mohamed Rishwan 25 (23); Imran Ali 3/16 (3 overs)		Ravija Sandaruwan 68* (36); Ameel Mauroof 1/11 (3 overs)

Kuwait won by 8 wickets
Al Amerat Cricket Stadium, Muscat
Umpires: Vinod Babu (Oma) and Shivani Mishra (Qat)
Player of the match: Ravija Sandaruwan (Kuw)

- Kuwait won the toss and elected to field.

In 2018 former South African international Herschelle Gibbs was appointed coach of Kuwait for the 2020 ICC World Twenty20 qualification process.

== Tournament history ==
Legend

- Champions
- Runners-up
- Third place/Semi-finals
- Hosts
- Q Qualified/Advanced to next stage
- DNQ Did not qualify
- ▲ Promoted
- Remained in the same division
- ▼ Relegated

=== Cricket World Cup ===
Cricket World Cup record								Qualification record				
Year	Round	Position	Pld	W	L	T	NR	Pld	W	L	T	NR
(England) 1975	Not an ICC member							Not an ICC member				
(England) 1979	Not an ICC member							Not an ICC member				
(England) (Wales) 1983	Not an ICC member							Not an ICC member				
(India) (Pakistan) 1987	Not an ICC member							Not an ICC member				
(Australia) (New Zealand) 1992	Not an ICC member							Not an ICC member				
(India) (Pakistan) (Sri Lanka) 1996	Not an ICC member							Not an ICC member				
(England) (Wales) (Scotland) (Republic of Ireland) (Netherlands) 1999	Not eligible; ICC affiliate member							Not eligible; ICC affiliate member				
(South Africa) (Zimbabwe) (Kenya) 2003	Not eligible; ICC affiliate member							Not eligible; ICC affiliate member				
(Cricket West Indies) 2007	Did not qualify							9	6	3	0	0
(India) (Sri Lanka) (Bangladesh) 2011	Did not enter							Did not enter				
(Australia) (New Zealand) 2015	Did not qualify							17	13	3	0	1
(England) (Wales) 2019	Did not qualify							5	0	5	0	0
(India) 2023	Did not enter							Did not enter				
(South Africa) (Namibia) (Zimbabwe) 2027	To be determined							10*	6	2	1	1
Total	—N/a	0/14	–	–	–	–	–	41	25	13	1	2

=== Cricket World Cup Challenge League ===
Cricket World Cup Challenge League record
Year	League	Position	Pld	W	L	T	NR	P/R
2019–22	Did not qualify							
2024–26	A	2/6	15	9	4	1	1	TBD
Total	0 Titles	1/2	15	9	4	1	1	—N/a

=== Men's T20 World Cup ===
Men's T20 World Cup record								Qualification record				
Year	Round	Position	Pld	W	L	T	NR	Pld	W	L	T	NR
(South Africa) 2007	Not eligible							Not eligible				
(England) 2009	Not eligible							Not eligible				
(Cricket West Indies) 2010	Not eligible							Not eligible				
(Sri Lanka) 2012	Did not qualify							5	2	3	0	0
(Bangladesh) 2014	Did not qualify							4	2	2	0	0
(India) 2016	Did not qualify							5	4	1	0	0
(United Arab Emirates) (Oman) 2021	Did not qualify							9	3	5	0	1
(Australia) 2022	Did not qualify							4	2	2	0	0
(United States) (Cricket West Indies) 2024	Did not qualify							9	6	3	0	0
(India) (Sri Lanka) 2026	Did not qualify							8	4	3	0	1
(Australia) (New Zealand) 2028	To be determined							6	5	1	0	0
Total	—N/a	0/10	–	–	–	–	–	50	28	20	0	2

=== T20 World Cup Asia Regional Final ===
T20 World Cup Asia Regional Final record
Year	Round	Position	Pld	W	L	T	NR	Qual.
(Singapore) 2019	Round-robin	4/5	4	1	2	0	1	DNQ
(Nepal) 2023	Group stage	7/8	3	1	2	0	0	DNQ
(Oman) 2025	Group stage	9/9	2	0	2	0	0	DNQ
(To be determined) 2027	Qualified							
Total	0 Titles	4/4	9	2	6	0	1	—N/a

=== Asian Games ===
Cricket at the Asian Games record
Year	Round	Position	Pld	W	L	T	NR
(China) 2010	Did not participate						
(South Korea) 2014	Quarter-finals	5/10	3	0	2	0	1
(China) 2022	Did not participate						
(Japan) 2026	Did not participate						
Total	1/4	0 Titles	3	0	2	0	1

=== Other international tournaments ===
CWC Challenge League Play-off (List A)	World Cricket League (LA/OD/ODI)
2024: Winners (Q)	2010 (Division Eight) : Winners (▲); 2011 (Division Seven) : Winners (▲); 2011 (Division Six) : 3rd place; 2013 (Division Six) : 6th place

=== Other regional tournaments ===
T20WC Asia Sub-regional Qualifiers (T20I)	Premier Cup/Asia Cup Qualifier (OD/T20I)	ACC Twenty20 Cup (T20)
2018: 3rd place (DNQ); 2021: 3rd place (DNQ); 2023: Winners (Q); 2024: Runners-up (Q)	2022: Runners-up (DNQ); 2023: 4th place (DNQ); 2024: 5th place (DNQ); 2026: 7th place (DNQ)	2007: 3rd place; 2009: 4th place; 2011: 7th place; 2013: 5th place; 2015: Runners-up
ACC Trophy (OD)	ACC Western Region T20 (T20)	
2000: First round; 2002: First round; 2004: 3rd place; 2006: First round; 2008 (Elite): 8th place; 2008 (Elite): 7th place; 2012 (Elite): 7th place; 2014 (Elite): 3rd place	2019: 4th place; 2020: Runners-up	

== Current squad ==
This lists all the players who have played for Kuwait in 12 months or has been part of the latest One-day or T20I squad.

Name	Age	Batting style	Bowling style	Forms	Notes
Batters
Ravija Sandaruwan	34	Right-handed	Right-arm off break	One-day & T20I	
Meet Bhavsar	22	Left-handed	Slow left-arm orthodox	One-day & T20I	
Bilal Tahir	28	Left-handed	Right-arm off break	One-day & T20I	Vice-Captain
Mohammad Amin	39	Right-handed	Right-arm off break	One-day	
Clinto Anto	32	Right-handed		One-day & T20I	
Muhammad Umar	22	Right-handed	Right-arm leg break	T20I	
All-rounders
Mohammed Aslam	36	Right-handed	Slow left-arm orthodox	One-day & T20I	Captain
Yasin Patel	29	Left-handed	Slow left-arm orthodox	One-day & T20I	
Shiraz Khan	32	Right-handed	Right-arm leg break	One-day & T20I	
Adnan Idrees	36	Right-handed	Right-arm off break	One-day & T20I	
Nimish Lathief	37	Left-handed	Right-arm off break	T20I	
Wicket-keeper
Usman Patel	36	Right-handed		One-day & T20I	
Bowlers
Mohamed Shafeeq	32	Right-handed	Right-arm medium	One-day & T20I	
Sayed Monib	34	Right-handed	Right-arm medium	One-day & T20I	
Shahrukh Quddus	29	Right-handed	Right-arm medium	One-day	
Ilyas Ahmed	36	Left-handed	Left-arm medium	One-day & T20I	
Nawaf Ahmed	34	Left-handed	Right-arm medium	T20I	
Mirza Ahmed	22	Right-handed	Right-arm medium	T20I	

Updated as of 9 September 2024.

== Records ==
International Match Summary — Kuwait

Last updated 12 October 2026

Playing Record
Format	M	W	L	T	NR	Inaugural Match
Twenty20 Internationals	88	88	0	3	1	20 January 2019

=== Twenty20 International ===
- Highest team total: 226/4 v Maldives, 2 September 2024 at UKM-YSD Cricket Oval, Bangi
- Highest individual score: 111*, Usman Patel v Maldives, 2 September 2024 at UKM-YSD Cricket Oval, Bangi
- Best individual bowling figures: 4/5, Mohammed Aslam v Iran, 25 February 2020 at Oman Cricket Academy Ground, Muscat

Most T20I runs for Kuwait

Player	Runs	Average	Career span
Ravija Sandaruwan	2,094	27.19	2019–2026
Meet Bhavsar	1,855	27.68	2019–2026
Usman Patel	1,136	23.66	2020–2026
Mohammed Aslam	976	22.21	2019–2026
Clinto Anto	907	23.25	2023–2026

Most T20I wickets for Kuwait

Player	Wickets	Average	Career span
Mohammed Aslam	85	19.57	2019–2026
Yasin Patel	66	19.36	2022–2026
Sayeb Monib	54	20.51	2020–2024
Shiraz Khan	46	24.91	2019–2025
Adnan Idrees	38	19.89	2019–2024

T20I record versus other nations

Records complete to T20I #4194. Last updated 12 October 2026.

Opponent	M	W	L	T	NR	First match	First win
vs Associate Members
Bahrain	16	11	4	1	0	23 January 2019	23 January 2019
Bhutan	1	1	0	0	0	12 October 2026	12 October 2026
Cambodia	1	1	0	0	0	13 April 2024	13 April 2024
Hong Kong	11	5	5	0	1	23 August 2022	21 August 2024
Iran	1	1	0	0	0	25 February 2020	25 February 2020
Japan	1	1	0	0	0	9 October 2025	26 November 8
Malaysia	6	2	4	0	0	22 July 2019	25 August 2024
Maldives	5	5	0	0	0	20 January 2019	20 January 2019
Mongolia	2	2	0	0	0	30 August 2024	30 August 2024
Myanmar	2	2	0	0	0	3 September 2024	3 September 2024
Nepal	4	1	3	0	0	27 July 2019	13 April 2025
Oman	5	1	4	0	0	22 September 2023	20 December 2024
Qatar	12	7	3	2	0	22 January 2019	4 July 2019
Saudi Arabia	7	4	3	0	0	24 January 2019	23 February 2020
Singapore	2	1	1	0	0	24 August 2022	24 August 2022
Tanzania	1	1	0	0	0	6 March 2024	6 March 2024
Thailand	1	1	0	0	0	8 October 2026	8 October 2026
United Arab Emirates	8	1	7	0	0	24 February 2020	21 August 2022
Vanuatu	2	2	0	0	0	7 March 2024	7 March 2024

== Administration and support staff ==
Position	Name
Head coach	(England) Qasim Ali
Assistant coach	(India) Nikhil Kulkarni
Fielding Coach	(Sri Lanka) Shashika
Analyst	(Sri Lanka) Prabhath Fernando

== See also ==
- List of Kuwait Twenty20 International cricketers
- Kuwait women's national cricket team
