= List of Kuwait Twenty20 International cricketers =

This is a list of Kuwaiti Twenty20 International cricketers.

In April 2018, the ICC decided to grant full Twenty20 International (T20I) status to all its members. Therefore, all Twenty20 matches played between Kuwait and other ICC members after 1 January 2019 have the full T20I status.

This list comprises all members of the Kuwait cricket team who have played at least one T20I match. It is initially arranged in the order in which each player won his first Twenty20 cap. Where more than one player won their first Twenty20 cap in the same match, their surnames are listed alphabetically.

== Key ==
General

- ‡ – Captain
- † – Wicket-keeper
- First – Year of debut
- Last – Year of latest game
- Mat – Number of matches played

Batting

- Runs – Runs scored in career
- HS – Highest score
- Avg – Runs scored per dismissal
- * – Batsman remained not out
- 50 – Number of half centuries
- 100 – Centuries scored

Bowling

- Balls – Balls bowled in career
- Wkt – Wickets taken in career
- BBI – Best bowling in an innings
- Ave – Average runs per wicket

Fielding

- Ca – Catches taken
- St – Stumpings affected

== List of players ==
Statistics are correct as of 12 October 2026.

Kuwait T20I cricketers
General					Batting					Bowling				Fielding		Ref
No.	Name	First	Last	Mat	Runs	HS	Avg	50	100	Balls	Wkt	BBI	Ave	Ca	St	Ref
1	Meet Bhavsar†	2019	2026	82	1,882	89	27.27	13	0	340	24	3/10	14.45	34	3	
2	Fiaz Ahmad	2019	2019	3	0	0*	–	0	0	30	1	1/13	56.00	0	0	
3	Imran Ali	2019	2019	4	5	5*	5.00	0	0	90	7	3/16	19.42	2	0	
4	Wasantha Kumaranayaka	2019	2021	8	–	–	–	–	–	180	5	2/26	48.00	3	0	
5	Arjun Makesh	2019	2019	4	57	57	57.00	1	0	54	1	1/19	79.00	1	0	
6	Mohammad Amin‡	2019	2020	11	116	32	19.33	0	0	12	1	1/12	18.00	3	0	
7	Mohammed Asghar	2019	2019	4	124	45	31.00	0	0	24	0	–	–	2	0	
8	Muhammad Kashif‡	2019	2022	21	311	53	22.21	2	0	192	12	3/30	22.58	3	0	
9	Ravija Sandaruwan	2019	2026	86	2,270	103	28.37	13	2	–	–	–	–	20	0	
10	Morshed Mostafa Sarwar	2019	2021	7	12	8	4.00	0	0	76	5	2/13	22.60	1	0	
11	Diju Sheeli	2019	2023	7	64	19	9.14	0	0	–	–	–	–	4	0	
12	Jandu Hamoud	2019	2019	6	2	2	2.00	0	0	96	4	2/25	28.00	2	0	^{1}
13	Yasar Idrees	2019	2019	1	8	8	8.00	0	0	–	–	–	–	1	0	
14	Adnan Idrees	2019	2026	48	613	80	15.71	3	0	719	50	3/15	16.76	12	0	
15	Mohammed Aslam‡	2019	2026	84	989	55	21.04	4	0	1,747	100	5/19	17.78	27	0	
16	Ilyas Ahmed	2019	2024	19	15	4*	15.00	0	0	372	19	3/17	24.15	1	0	
17	Mohammad Ahsan	2019	2019	6	19	8	6.33	0	0	120	4	2/31	48.00	0	0	
18	Shiraz Khan	2019	2025	55	396	50*	18.85	1	0	1,072	46	4/12	24.91	18	0	
19	Usman Waheed†	2019	2019	6	64	28*	21.33	0	0	–	–	–	–	1	0	
20	Sanker Varathappan	2019	2019	3	14	9	4.66	0	0	–	–	–	–	0	0	
21	Bilal Tahir	2019	2026	69	813	61*	20.84	1	0	74	6	2/7	12.33	30	0	
22	Nawaf Ahmed	2019	2024	10	13	10*	4.33	0	0	123	4	2/10	45.50	4	0	
23	Aphsal Ashraf	2020	2020	5	53	45*	26.50	0	0	30	2	2/35	20.50	2	0	
24	Muhammad Ansar	2020	2020	4	5	5	5.00	0	0	83	6	3/27	23.83	0	0	
25	Sayed Monib	2020	2024	44	280	32*	14.73	0	0	764	54	4/16	20.51	16	0	
26	Usman Patel†	2020	2026	64	1,136	111*	23.66	7	1	–	–	–	–	32	19	
27	Naveed Fakhr	2020	2021	3	0	0*	–	0	0	48	1	1/31	63.00	1	0	
28	Edson Silva	2021	2022	12	225	58	25.00	2	0	120	6	2/15	25.16	3	0	
29	Haroon Shahid	2022	2022	2	12	7	12.00	0	0	30	0	–	–	0	0	
30	Mohamed Shafeeq	2022	2026	48	27	6	2.70	0	0	944	38	3/28	33.34	12	0	
31	Yasin Patel	2022	2026	63	262	40	14.55	0	0	1,406	75	4/12	18.17	31	0	
32	Shahrukh Quddus	2022	2026	15	2	2*	–	0	0	284	13	3/14	31.15	1	0	
33	Ali Zaheer	2022	2026	15	173	41	21.62	0	0	–	–	–	–	7	0	
34	Ahsan ul Haq	2023	2023	3	1	1	0.50	0	0	–	–	–	–	0	0	
35	Parvindar Kumar	2023	2024	11	49	19	12.25	0	0	84	3	1/20	38.66	7	0	
36	Clinto Anto†	2023	2026	50	966	75	23.56	3	0	–	–	–	–	20	10	
37	Nimish Lathief	2023	2026	19	110	18	13.75	0	0	241	11	2/19	30.09	8	0	
38	Mirza Ahmed	2023	2024	6	1	1*	–	0	0	96	6	2/15	19.83	3	0	
39	Muhammad Umar	2024	2026	31	441	78	23.21	2	0	12	0	–	–	13	0	
40	Anudeep Chenthamara	2025	2026	15	8	5*	–	0	0	256	16	3/15	18.25	2	0	
41	Naveenraj Rajendran	2025	2026	9	35	11	11.66	0	0	204	11	3/15	18.54	1	0	
42	Muhammad Aqif Farooq	2025	2026	4	1	1	1.00	0	0	90	6	3/24	24.16	1	0	
43	Umer Abbas	2026	2026	1	–	–	–	–	–	6	0	–	–	1	0	
