= Kuwaiti cricket team in Qatar in 2019 =

	Qatar	Kuwait
- Dates: 4 – 6 July 2019
Captains	Tamoor Sajjad	Muhammad Kashif

Twenty20 International series
- Results: Qatar won the 3-match series 2–1
Most runs	Muhammad Tanveer (105)	Adnan Idrees (166)
Most wickets	Awais Malik (4)	Ilyas Ahmed (8)

The Kuwait cricket team toured Qatar in July 2019 to play a three-match Twenty20 International (T20I) series. This was the first bilateral T20I series for both sides. The series formed part of both teams' preparation for the Asian Regional Qualifying Finals tournament for the 2019 ICC T20 World Cup Qualifier. All of the matches were played at the West End Park International Cricket Stadium in Doha. Kuwait won the opening match by seven wickets, before the second match was decided by a Super Over which was won by Qatar, after the game was tied. Qatar won the final match by three wickets to win the series 2–1.

== Squads ==
Qatar	Kuwait
Tamoor Sajjad (c); Inam-ul-Haq; Iqbal Hussain; Zaheer Ibrahim; Faisal Javed; Kamran Khan; Qalandar Khan; Awais Malik; Gayan Munaweera; Mohammed Nadeem; Mohammed Rizlan; Tamoor Sajjad; Nouman Sarwar; Musawar Shah; Muhammad Tanveer	Muhammad Kashif (c); Ilyas Ahmed; Mohammad Ahsan; Mohammed Aslam; Meet Bhavsar (wk); Naveed Fakhr; Jandu Hamoud; Adnan Idrees; Shiraz Khan; Ravija Sandaruwan; Morshed Mostofa Sarwar; Bilal Tahir; Sanker Varathappan; Usman Waheed (wk)

== T20I series ==
=== 1st T20I ===
4 July 2019
19:00 (D/N)
Scorecard

Qatar; 154/9 (20 overs)	v	Kuwait; 157/3 (16.3 overs)
Muhammad Tanveer 50 (42); Ilyas Ahmed 3/17 (4 overs)		Adnan Idrees 79 (50); Inam-ul-Haq 1/13 (3 overs)

Kuwait won by 7 wickets
West End Park International Cricket Stadium, Doha
Umpires: Shivani Mishra (Qat) and Mohammad Nasim (Qat)
Player of the match: Adnan Idrees (Kuw)

- Kuwait won the toss and elected to field.
- Qalandar Khan, Gayan Munaweera (Qat), Ilyas Ahmed, Mohammad Ahsan, Mohammed Aslam, Adnan Idrees, Shiraz Khan, Sanker Varathappan and Usman Waheed (Kuw) all made their T20I debuts.

=== 2nd T20I ===
5 July 2019
18:00 (D/N)
Scorecard

Kuwait; 112/8 (20 overs)	v	Qatar; 112 (20 overs)
Mohammed Aslam 26 (30); Nouman Sarwar 3/17 (4 overs)		Mohammed Rizlan 32 (37); Ilyas Ahmed 2/19 (4 overs)

Match tied
(Qatar won the Super Over)
West End Park International Cricket Stadium, Doha
Umpires: Riyaz Kurupkar (Qat) and Shivani Mishra (Qat)
Player of the match: Nouman Sarwar (Qat)

- Qatar won the toss and elected to field.

=== 3rd T20I ===
6 July 2019
18:00 (D/N)
Scorecard

Kuwait; 203/5 (20 overs)	v	Qatar; 206/7 (20 overs)
Ravija Sandaruwan 88 (55); Awais Malik 2/28 (4 overs)		Muhammad Tanveer 50 (30); Ilyas Ahmed 3/37 (4 overs)

Qatar won by 3 wickets
West End Park International Cricket Stadium, Doha
Umpires: Riyaz Kurupkar (Qat) and Mohammad Nasim (Qat)
Player of the match: Mohammed Rizlan (Qat)

- Qatar won the toss and elected to field.
- Musawar Shah (Qat) and Bilal Tahir (Kuw) both made their T20I debuts.
