= 2016 Kenya Quadrangular One-Day and T20 Series =

Cricket tournament

In September 2016, Kenya hosted the national teams of Qatar, Saudi Arabia and Uganda for two quadrangular series. A 50-over series took place from 20 to 24 September, and this was followed by a Twenty20 series. Matches did not have official One Day International or Twenty20 International status as none of the participating teams had either status at the time. The matches were played at the Gymkhana Club Ground and the Jaffery Sports Club Ground, both in Nairobi.

The hosts topped the round-robin tournament table in the 50-over series, before defeating Saudi Arabia by six wickets in the final. The East African sides were both eliminated after the round-robin stage of the T20 series and the final was played between Saudi Arabia and Qatar, a match that was won by Saudi Arabia by 7 wickets.

== Squads ==
Kenya	Qatar	Saudi Arabia	Uganda
Rakep Patel (c); Emmanuel Bundi; Dhiren Gondaria; Irfan Karim (wk); Karan Kaul; Jegar Kerai; Peter Koech; Shem Ngoche; Alex Obanda; Collins Obuya; Eugene Ochieng; Nehemiah Odhiambo; Nelson Odhiambo; Lucas Oluoch; Elijah Otieno; Rushab Patel; Gurdeep Singh	Inam-ul-Haq (c); Imran Ashraf; Iqbal Hussain; Faisal Javed; Kamran Khan (wk); Qalandar Khan; Awais Malik; Mohammed Nadeem; Mujeeb-ur-Rehman; Mohammed Rizlan; Tamoor Sajjad; Nouman Sarwar	Shoaib Ali (c); Muhammad Abbasi; Mohammad Afzal; Waqas Akram; Imran Azam; Faique Habib; Nadeem Javed; Muzaffar Mujeed; Hammad Saeed; Inayat Saeed (wk); Mohsin Shabbir; Roheel Shamus; Ibrar-ul-Haq; Abdul Waheed	Zephania Arinaitwe (c); Irfan Afridi; Aneef Hameed; Emmanuel Isaneez; Davis Karashani; Hamu Kayondo; Arthur Kyobe; Abdalah Lubega; Brian Masaba; Deusdedit Muhumuza; Roger Mukasa; Frank Nsubuga; Arnold Otwani; Lawrence Sematimba (wk); Jonathan Ssebanja; Henry Ssenyondo; Charles Waiswa

== 50-Over Series ==
2016 Kenya Quadrangular One-Day Series
- Dates: 20 – 24 September 2016
- Administrator: Cricket Kenya
- Cricket format: One-Day cricket
- Host: Kenya
- Champions: Kenya
- Runners-up: Saudi Arabia
- Participants: 4
- Matches: 7
- Most runs: (Saudi Arabia) Abdul Waheed (218)
- Most wickets: (Kenya) Nelson Odhiambo (10)

=== Points table ===
Team	P	W	L	T	NR	Pts	NRR	Status
Kenya	3	2	1	0	0	4	+0.828	Advanced to the final
Saudi Arabia	3	2	1	0	0	4	+0.245	Advanced to the final
Uganda	3	1	2	0	0	2	–0.289	
Qatar	3	1	2	0	0	2	–0.788	

=== Matches ===
20 September 2016
09:30
Scorecard

Kenya; 355/9 (50 overs)	v	Qatar; 238 (46.4 overs)
Irfan Karim 101 (97); Tamoor Sajjad 3/53 (10 overs)		Mohammed Rizlan 58 (58); Elijah Otieno 3/15 (6 overs)

Kenya won by 117 runs
Gymkhana Club Ground, Nairobi
Umpires: Munir Khan (Ken) and Patric Makumbi (Uga)
Player of the match: Irfan Karim (Ken)

- Qatar won the toss and elected to field.

20 September 2016
09:30
Scorecard

Saudi Arabia; 240 (42.2 overs)	v	Uganda; 203 (45.3 overs)
Inayat Saeed 132 (77); Henry Ssenyondo 3/44 (8.2 overs)		Arthur Kyobe 40 (45); Ibrarul Haq 4/46 (10 overs)

Saudi Arabia won by 37 runs
Jaffery Sports Club Ground, Nairobi
Umpires: Charles Kariuki (Ken) and Walter Trenk (Ken)
Player of the match: Inayat Saeed (Sau)

- Uganda won the toss and elected to field.

21 September 2016
09:30
Scorecard

Kenya; 305/9 (50 overs)	v	Saudi Arabia; 289 (48.5 overs)
Rakep Patel 93* (84); Mohammad Afzal 4/59 (10 overs)		Abdul Waheed 116 (118); Nelson Odhiambo 4/29 (7 overs)

Kenya won by 16 runs
Gymkhana Club Ground, Nairobi
Umpires: Charles Kariuki (Ken) and Patric Makumbi (Uga)
Player of the match: Rakep Patel (Ken)

- Saudi Arabia won the toss and elected to field.

21 September 2016
09:30
Scorecard

Uganda; 265 (46.2 overs)	v	Qatar; 266/5 (47.1 overs)
Roger Mukasa 75 (56); Mujeeb-ur-Rehman 3/42 (9.2 overs)		Nouman Sarwar 79 (81); Irfan Afridi 3/37 (10 overs)

Qatar won by 5 wickets
Jaffery Sports Club Ground, Nairobi
Umpires: Asgarali Kassam (Ken) and Nicholas Otieno (Ken)

- Uganda won the toss and elected to bat.

23 September 2016
09:30
Scorecard

Kenya; 201 (44.2 overs)	v	Uganda; 204/8 (48.5 overs)
Dhiren Gondaria 65 (74); Deusdedit Muhumuza 5/49 (8 overs)		Arthur Kyobe 68 (98); Nelson Odhiambo 3/38 (7 overs)

Uganda won by 2 wickets
Jaffery Sports Club Ground, Nairobi
Umpires: Dennis Angara (Ken) and Maxwell Okello (Ken)
Player of the match: Deusdedit Muhumuza (Uga)

- Uganda won the toss and elected to field.

23 September 2016
09:30
Scorecard

Qatar; 270/9 (50 overs)	v	Saudi Arabia; 274/7 (47.5 overs)
Imran Ashraf 61 (64); Muhammad Abbasi 3/46 (10 overs)		Abdul Waheed 59 (58); Tamoor Sajjad 2/30 (8 overs)

Saudi Arabia won by 3 wickets
Gymkhana Club Ground, Nairobi
Umpires: Patrick Musoke (Uga) and Walter Trenk (Ken)

- Qatar won the toss and elected to bat.

=== Final ===
24 September 2016
09:30
Scorecard

Saudi Arabia; 292/7 (50 overs)	v	Kenya; 296/4 (39.4 overs)
Hammad Saeed 76 (67); Nelson Odhiambo 3/59 (8 overs)		Dhiren Gondaria 126 (85); Muzaffar Mujeed 1/32 (3 overs)

Kenya won by 6 wickets
Jaffery Sports Club Ground, Nairobi
Umpires: Asgarali Kassam (Ken) and Munir Khan (Uga)

- Kenya won the toss and elected to bat.

== T20 Series ==
2016 Kenya Quadrangular T20 Series
- Dates: 26 – 30 September 2016
- Administrator: Cricket Kenya
- Cricket format: Twenty20
- Host: Kenya
- Champions: Saudi Arabia
- Runners-up: Qatar
- Participants: 4
- Matches: 7
- Most runs: (Saudi Arabia) Abdul Waheed (212)
- Most wickets: (Saudi Arabia) Ibrarul Haq (8)

=== Points table ===
Team	P	W	L	T	NR	Pts	NRR	Status
Saudi Arabia	3	3	0	0	0	6	+1.767	Advanced to the final
Qatar	3	2	1	0	0	4	+0.289	Advanced to the final
Kenya	3	1	2	0	0	2	–0.172	
Uganda	3	0	3	0	0	0	–2.090	

=== Matches ===
26 September 2016
Scorecard

Kenya	v	Qatar

Match abandoned
Jaffery Sports Club Ground, Nairobi
Umpires: Patric Makumbi (Uga) and Subhash Modi (Ken)

- No toss.
- The match was rescheduled for 29 September.

26 September 2016
Scorecard

Saudi Arabia; 179/4 (20 overs)	v	Uganda; 148/4 (20 overs)
Abdul Waheed 71 (44); Brian Masaba 2/35 (4 overs)		Hamu Kayondo 29 (33); Waqas Akram 3/26 (3 overs)

Saudi Arabia won by 31 runs
Gymkhana Club Ground, Nairobi
Umpires: Dennis Angara (Ken) and Charles Kariuki (Ken)

- Uganda won the toss and elected to field.

27 September 2016
Scorecard

Saudi Arabia; 123 (20 overs)	v	Kenya; 84 (17 overs)
Afzal Saleem 32 (36); Nelson Odhiambo 3/26 (4 overs)		Shem Ngoche 22* (21); Waqas Akram 2/9 (2 overs)

Saudi Arabia won by 39 runs
Gymkhana Club Ground, Nairobi
Umpires: Patrick Musoke (Ken) and Walter Trenk (Ken)

- Kenya won the toss and elected to field.

27 September 2016
Scorecard

Uganda; 105/8 (20 overs)	v	Qatar; 108/4 (13.5 overs)
Hamu Kayondo 25 (29); Mohammed Nadeem 3/12 (4 overs)		Mohammed Rizlan 30 (22); Hamu Kayondo 2/22 (4 overs)

Qatar won by 6 wickets
Jaffery Sports Club Ground, Nairobi
Umpires: Asgarali Kassam (Ken)

- Uganda won the toss and elected to bat.

28 September 2016
Scorecard

Uganda; 129/7 (20 overs)	v	Kenya; 133/3 (15.5 overs)
Brian Masaba 36 (35); Elijah Otieno 2/17 (4 overs)		Irfan Karim 70* (58); Jonathan Ssebanja 1/9 (1 over)

Kenya won by 7 wickets
Gymkhana Club Ground, Nairobi
Umpires: Patrick Musoke (Uga) and Isaac Oyieko (Ken)

- Kenya won the toss and elected to field.

28 September 2016
Scorecard

Saudi Arabia; 175/6 (20 overs)	v	Qatar; 139/8 (20 overs)
Afzal Saleem 54* (41); Awais Malik 2/16 (4 overs)		Tamoor Sajjad 51 (45); Muhammad Abbasi 2/19 (3 overs); Afzar Saleem 2/19 (3 overs)

Saudi Arabia won by 36 runs
Jaffery Sports Club Ground, Nairobi
Umpires: Hannington Ochieng (Ken)

- Qatar won the toss and elected to field.

29 September 2016
Scorecard

Kenya; 158/7 (20 overs)	v	Qatar; 159/8 (19.4 overs)
Rakep Patel 54 (40); Mujeeb-ur-Rehman 2/30 (4 overs)		Faisal Javed 35 (16); Nelson Odhiambo 3/29 (4 overs)

Qatar won by 2 wickets
Gymkhana Club Ground, Nairobi
Umpires: Asgarali Kassam (Ken) and Nicholas Otieno (Ken)

- Qatar won the toss and elected to field.

=== Final ===
30 September 2016
Scorecard

Qatar; 162/9 (20 overs)	v	Saudi Arabia; 166/3 (18 overs)
Iman-ul-Haq 43 (25); Ibrarul Haq 3/32 (4 overs)		Abdul Waheed 98* (58); Mujeeb-ur-Rehman 1/15 (3 overs)

Saudi Arabia won by 7 wickets
Jaffery Sports Club Ground, Nairobi
Umpires: Asgarali Kassam (Ken) and Subhash Modi (Ken)

- Saudi Arabia won the toss and elected to field.
