= Ugandan cricket team in Qatar in 2019–20 =

Uganda cricket team in Qatar in 2019–20
	Qatar	Uganda
- Dates: 11 – 15 February 2020
Captains	Iqbal Hussain	Brian Masaba (Note: Arnold Otwani captained Uganda for the T20I matches.)

Twenty20 International series
- Results: Qatar won the 3-match series 2–1
Most runs	Kamran Khan (134)	Frank Akankwasa (95)
Most wickets	Awais Malik (5); Iqbal Hussain (5)	Deusdedit Muhumuza (5)
- Player of the series: Kamran Khan (Qat)

The Uganda cricket team toured Qatar in February 2020 to play a three-match Twenty20 International (T20I) series. The tour also included two 50-over games against a President's XI. The venue for all of the matches was the West End Park International Cricket Stadium in Doha. The series was won 2–1 by Qatar, and Qatari batsman Kamran Khan was named as player of the series.

== Squads ==
Qatar	Uganda
Iqbal Hussain (c); Saqlain Arshad; Imran Ashraf; Zaheer Ibrahim; Faisal Javed; Kamran Khan; Imal Liyanage; Awais Malik; Gayan Munaweera; Mohammed Nadeem; Mohammed Rizlan; Nouman Sarwar; Khurram Shahzad; Muhammad Tanveer	Brian Masaba (c); Arnold Otwani (vc); Fred Achelam; Richard Agamiire; Frank Akankwasa; Zephania Arinaitwe; Trevor Bukenya; Saud Islam; Deusdedit Muhumuza; Roger Mukasa; Frank Nsubuga; Henry Ssenyondo; Charles Waiswa; Kenneth Waiswa

== Tour matches ==
=== 1st 50-over match ===
11 February 2020
10:00
Scorecard

Uganda; 265/4 (50 overs)	v	Qatar President XI; 266/8 (43 overs)
Saud Islam 116 (100); Iqbal Hussain 2/63 (10 overs)		Imal Liyanage 83 (60); Charles Waiswa 2/46 (10 overs)

Qatar President XI won by 2 wickets
West End Park International Cricket Stadium, Doha
Player of the match: Mirza Baig (Qatar President XI)

- Qatar President XI won the toss and elected to field.

=== 2nd 50-over match ===
14 February 2020
13:30
Scorecard

Uganda; 282/7 (50 overs)	v	Qatar President XI; 144 (37.1 overs)
Saud Islam 57 (49); Himanshu Rathod 2/49 (9 overs)		Imran Ashraf 28 (35); Henry Ssenyondo 3/23 (10 overs)

Uganda won by 138 runs
West End Park International Cricket Stadium, Doha
Player of the match: Deusdedit Muhumuza (Uga)

- Uganda won the toss and elected to bat.

== T20I series ==
=== 1st T20I ===
12 February 2020
18:00 (D/N)
Scorecard

Qatar; 201/2 (20 overs)	v	Uganda; 161/6 (20 overs)
Muhammad Tanveer 57* (34); Frank Nsubuga 1/25 (4 overs)		Frank Akankwasa 66 (33); Awais Malik 2/30 (4 overs)

Qatar won by 40 runs
West End Park International Cricket Stadium, Doha
Umpires: Mohammad Nasim (Qat) and Muhammad Usman (Qat)
Player of the match: Muhammad Tanveer (Qat)

- Qatar won the toss and elected to bat.
- Imal Liyanage, Khurram Shahzad (Qat), Frank Akankwasa, Trevor Bukenya and Kenneth Waiswa (Uga) all made their T20I debuts.

=== 2nd T20I ===
13 February 2020
18:00 (D/N)
Scorecard

Qatar; 154/4 (20 overs)	v	Uganda; 126/7 (20 overs)
Kamran Khan 68 (52); Charles Waiswa 1/36 (4 overs)		Kenneth Waiswa 39 (23); Awais Malik 2/17 (4 overs)

Qatar won by 28 runs
West End Park International Cricket Stadium, Doha
Umpires: Prassanna Haran (Qat) and Riyaz Kurupkar (Qat)
Player of the match: Kamran Khan (Qat)

- Uganda won the toss and elected to field.

=== 3rd T20I ===
15 February 2020
18:00 (D/N)
Scorecard

Uganda; 134/6 (20 overs)	v	Qatar; 116 (18.4 overs)
Brian Masaba 29 (25); Iqbal Hussain 2/41 (4 overs)		Zaheer Ibrahim 44 (33); Deusdedit Muhumuza 5/13 (3.4 overs)

Uganda won by 18 runs
West End Park International Cricket Stadium, Doha
Umpires: Riyaz Kurupkar (Qat) and Mohammad Nasim (Qat)
Player of the match: Deusdedit Muhumuza (Uga)

- Uganda won the toss and elected to bat.
- Deusdedit Muhumuza became the first bowler for Uganda to take a five-wicket haul in T20Is.
