= Jersey cricket team in Qatar in 2019–20 =

	Qatar	Jersey
- Dates: 9 – 11 October 2019
Captains	Iqbal Hussain	Charles Perchard (Note: Dominic Blampied captained Jersey for the 1st and 3rd T20Is.)

Twenty20 International series
- Results: Qatar won the 3-match series 3–0
Most runs	Muhammad Tanveer (105)	Nicholas Ferraby (69)
Most wickets	Nouman Sarwar (6); Gayan Munaweera (6)	Dominic Blampied (4)

The Jersey cricket team toured Qatar in October 2019 to play a three-match Twenty20 International (T20I) series. Jersey used the series as preparation for the 2019 ICC T20 World Cup Qualifier. The matches were played at the West End Park International Cricket Stadium in Doha.

== Squads ==
Qatar	Jersey
Iqbal Hussain (c); Mohammed Rizlan (vc, wk); Saqlain Arshad; Imran Ashraf; Zaheer Ibrahim; Faisal Javed; Jassim Khan; Kamran Khan; Qalandar Khan; Gayan Munaweera; Mohammed Nadeem; Dharmang Patel; Nouman Sarwar; Muhammad Tanveer	Charles Perchard (c); Corey Bisson; Dominic Blampied; Harrison Carlyon; Jake Dunford (wk); Nicholas Ferraby; Nick Greenwood; Anthony Hawkins-Kay; Jonty Jenner; Elliot Miles; Rhys Palmer; William Robertson; Ben Stevens; Julius Sumerauer; Benjamin Ward

== T20I series ==
=== 1st T20I ===
9 October 2019
19:00 (D/N)
Scorecard

Qatar; 179/4 (20 overs)	v	Jersey; 159/6 (20 overs)
Faisal Javed 61 (31); Ben Stevens 2/17 (4 overs)		Nick Greenwood 42 (25); Nouman Sarwar 2/29 (4 overs)

Qatar won by 20 runs
West End Park International Cricket Stadium, Doha
Umpires: Shivani Mishra (Qat) and Prassanna Haran (Qat)

- Jersey won the toss and elected to field.
- Saqlain Arshad, Imran Ashraf (Qat) and Nick Greenwood (Jer) all made their T20I debuts.

=== 2nd T20I ===
10 October 2019
16:00 (D/N)
Scorecard

Jersey; 141/7 (20 overs)	v	Qatar; 142/4 (18.5 overs)
Nicholas Ferraby 45 (27); Iqbal Hussain 3/20 (4 overs)		Muhammad Tanveer 57* (45); Dominic Blampied 3/19 (4 overs)

Qatar won by 6 wickets
West End Park International Cricket Stadium, Doha
Umpires: Abdul Jabbar (Qat) and Mohammad Nasim (Qat)

- Jersey won the toss and elected to bat.
- Saqlain Arshad (Qat) was replaced by Qalandar Khan after 12 overs of the Jersey innings.

=== 3rd T20I ===
11 October 2019
08:15
Scorecard

Jersey; 101/9 (20 overs)	v	Qatar; 102/2 (13.1 overs)
Harrison Carlyon 32 (36); Nouman Sarwar 4/14 (4 overs)		Kamran Khan 51* (34); Julius Sumerauer 1/10 (2 overs)

Qatar won by 8 wickets
West End Park International Cricket Stadium, Doha
Umpires: Riyaz Kurupkar (Qat) and Shivani Mishra (Qat)

- Jersey won the toss and elected to bat.
