= Qatar T10 League =

Qatar T-10 Cricket League
- Countries: Qatar
- Administrator: Qatar Cricket Association
- Format: T10
- Tournament format: Double round robin and playoffs
- Number of teams: 6
- Current champion: Falcon Hunters
- Most runs: Mohammed Rizlan (138 runs)
- Most wickets: Ali Imran (8 wickets)
- TV: Geo Super
- Website: https://qatart10.com/

Qatar T-10 Cricket League or QT10 League was a T10 cricket franchise league played in 2019. It was founded in Doha and featured six teams during the only edition of the league. The tournament was organised by the Qatar Cricket Association.

== Teams ==
| Team | Captain |
|---|---|
| Desert Riders | Mohammad Hafeez |
| Flying Oryx | Hussain Talat |
| Falcon Hunters | Iqbal Hussain |
| Heat Stormers | Manpreet Gony |
| Pearl Gladiators | Mohammad Sami |
| Swift Gallopers | Kamran Akmal |

== 2019 ==
The only edition of the league was played between 7 and 16 December 2019. All matches were played at the West End Park International Cricket Stadium in Doha.

The final points table was:

| Team | P | W | L | T | NR | Pts | NRR |
|---|---|---|---|---|---|---|---|
| Swift Gallopers | 5 | 4 | 1 | 0 | 0 | 8 | +2.715 |
| Falcon Hunters | 5 | 4 | 1 | 0 | 0 | 8 | + 2.379 |
| Desert Riders | 5 | 3 | 1 | 0 | 1 | 7 | + 0.344 |
| Pearl Gladiators | 5 | 1 | 3 | 0 | 1 | 3 | 1.828 |
| Flying Oryx | 5 | 1 | 3 | 0 | 1 | 3 | 2.071 |
| Heat Stormers | 5 | 0 | 4 | 0 | 1 | 1 | 2.075 |

The matches played were:

- All timings are mentioned as per Qatar's local time.

7 December 2019
8:30 PM
Scorecard

| Pearl Gladiators; 83/5 (10) | v | Flying Oryx; 85/1 (7.4) |
| Faisal Javed 27 (26); Naved Malik 2/26 (2) | | Hussain Talat 59* (29); Mohammed Nadeem 1/11 (2) |

Flying Oryx won by 9 wickets.
West End Park International Cricket Stadium, Qatar
Player of the match: Hussain Talat (Flying Oryx)

- Flying Oryx won the toss & elected to bowl.

8 December 2019
6:30 PM
Scorecard

| Swift Gallopers; 93/5 (10) | v | Desert Riders; 94/3 (8.5) |
| Kamran Akmal 29 (13); Mohammad Hafeez 2/13 (2 overs) | | Muhammad Tanveer 49 (21); Inam-ul-Haq 12/1 (1 over) |

Desert Riders won by 7 wickets.
West End Park International Cricket Stadium, Qatar
Player of the match: Muhammad Tanveer (Desert Riders)

- Desert Riders won the toss and elected to bowl first.

8 December 2019
9:00 PM
Scorecard

| Heat Stormers; 103/6 (10) | v | Falcon Hunters; 104/4 (10) |
| Dharmang Patel 26 (14); Tamoor Sajjad 2/21 (2 overs) | | Salman Butt 39 (27); Owais Ahmed 3/19 (2 overs) |

Falcon Hunters won by 6 wickets.
West End Park International Cricket Stadium, Qatar
Player of the match: Salman Butt (Falcon Hunters)

- Falcon Hunters won the toss and will bowl first.

9 December 2019
6:30 PM
Scorecard

| Flying Oryx; 95/6 (10) | v | Desert Riders; 96/3 (8.2 overs) |
| Bilawal Iqbal 17 (21); Muhammad Iqram 2/23 (2 overs) | | Mohammad Hafeez 45 (23); Naved Malik 2/8 (1 over) |

Desert Riders won by 7 wickets.
West End Park International Cricket Stadium, Qatar
Player of the match: Mohammad Hafeez (Desert Riders)

- Desert Riders won the toss & elected to bowl.

9 December 2019
9:00 PM
Scorecard

| Swift Gallopers; 116/5 (10) | v | Falcon Hunters; 110/9 (10) |
| Zaheer Ibrahim 32 (19); Irshad Umer 1/14 (1 over) | | Mohammed Rizlan 35 (19); Gyan Wimalashantha 2/12 (1) |

Swift Gallopers won by 6 runs.
West End Park International Cricket Stadium, Qatar
Player of the match: Zaheer Ibrahim (Swift Gallopers)

- Swift Gallopers won the toss and choose to bat.

10 December 2019
6:30 PM
Scorecard

| Pearl Gladiators | v | Desert Riders |

Match abandoned
West End Park International Cricket Stadium, Qatar

- No Toss.
- No play was possible due to rain.

10 December 2019
9:00 PM
Scorecard

| Heat Stormers | v | Flying Oryx |

Match abandoned
West End Park International Cricket Stadium, Qatar

- No toss.
- No play was possible due to rain

11 December 2019
6:30 PM
Scorecard

| Desert Riders; 89/2 (10 overs) | v | Falcon Hunters; 90/4 (8.1 overs) |
| Muhammad Tanveer 33 (22); Saad Bin Zafar 1/4 (1 over) | | Mohammed Rizlan 35 (17); Ramith Rambukwella 1/5 (1 over) |

Falcon Hunters won by 6 wickets.
West End Park International Cricket Stadium, Qatar
Player of the match: Mohammed Rizlan (Falcon Hunters)

- Falcon Hunters won the toss and elected to bowl.

11 December 2019
9:00 PM
Scorecard

| Swift Gallopers; 153/7 (10 overs) | v | Heat Stormers; 87/7 (10 overs) |
| Imran Ali 53* (17); Satvir Singh 2/16 (2 overs) | | Manpreet Gony 31 (11); Mughees Bajwa 2/6 (2 overs) |

Swift Gallopers won by 66 runs
West End Park International Cricket Stadium, Qatar
Player of the match: Imran Ali (Swift Gallopers)

- Heat Stormers won the toss and elected to bowl.

12 December 2019
6:30 PM
Scorecard

| Swift Gallopers; 115/6 (10 overs) | v | Pearl Gladiators; 67/10 (8,4 overs) |
| Zaheer Ibrahim 35 (14); Ajantha Mendis 2/28 (2 overs) | | Mehran Khan 16 (10); Ali Imran 3/16 (1,4 overs) |

Swift Gallopers won by 48 runs
West End Park International Cricket Stadium, Qatar
Player of the match: Ali Imran (Swift Gallopers)

- Heat Stormers won the toss elected to field.

12 December 2019
9:00 PM
Scorecard

| Flying Oryx; 45/10 (9.2 overs) | v | Falcon Hunters; 49/0 (4.3 overs) |
| Harmandeep Singh 15 (11); Amad Butt 3/7 (1.2) | | Hashim Amla 22* (16) |

Falcon Hunters won by 10 wickets
West End Park International Cricket Stadium, Qatar
Player of the match: Amad Butt (Falcon Hunters)

- Falcon Hunters won the toss and choose to bowl.

13 December 2019
6:30 PM
Scorecard

| Heat Stormers; 134/2 (10 overs) | v | Desert Riders; 135/5 (10 overs) |
| Sikandar Raza 87* (41); Mohammad Hafeez 1/22 (2 overs) | | Adnan Mirza 51 (25); Gayan Munaweera 29/2 (2 overs) |

Desert Riders won by 5 wickets
West End Park International Cricket Stadium, Qatar
Player of the match: Adnan Mirza (Desert Riders)

- Desert Riders won the toss and elected to bowl

13 December 2019
9:00 PM
Scorecard

| Falcon Hunters; 117/3 (10 overs) | v | Pearl Galdiators; 81/7 (10 overs) |
| Mohammed Rizlan 37* (9); Mehran Khan 1/13 (2 overs) | | Malinda Puspakumara 14 (12); Iqbal Hossain 2/10 (2 overs) |

Falcon Hunters won by 37 runs
West End Park International Cricket Stadium, Qatar
Player of the match: Mohammed Rizlan (Falcon Hunters)

- Pearl Gladiators won the toss and choose to field

14 December 2019
6:30 PM
Scorecard

| Swift Gallopers; 98/6 (10 overs) | v | Flying Oryx; 71/8 (10 overs) |
| Ravinderpal Singh 34 (18); Bilawal Iqbal 2/14 (2 overs) | | Bilawal Iqbal 18 (12); Mohammad Imran 3/14 (2 overs) |

Swift Gallopers won by 27 runs
West End Park International Cricket Stadium, Qatar
Player of the match: Mohammad Imran (Swift Gallopers)

- Swift Gallopers won the toss and choose bat.

14 December 2019
9:00 PM
Scorecard

| Pearl Gladiators; 93/6 (10 overs) | v | Heat Stormers; 78/10 (8,4 overs) |
| Sohaib Maqsood 36 (24); Batin Shah 3/14 (2 overs) | | Imraz Rafi 27 (14); Philip Joseph 3/20 (1.4 overs) |

Pearl Gladiators won by 15 runs
West End Park International Cricket Stadium, Qatar
Player of the match: Sohaib Maqsood (Pearl Gladiators)

- Pearl Gladiators won the toss and elected to bat.

15 December 2019
6:30 PM (D/N)
Scorecard

| Desert Riders | v | Falcon Hunters |

Match abandoned
West End Park International Cricket Stadium , Doha

- No toss
- No play was possible due to rain

15 December 2019
9:00 PM (D/N)
Scorecard

| Flying Oryx | v | Swift Gallopers |

Match abandoned
West End Park International Cricket Stadium, Doha

- No toss
- No play was possible due to rain

16 December 2019
3:00 PM
Scorecard

| Flying Oryx | v | Desert Riders |

Match abandoned
West End Park International Cricket Stadium, Doha

- No toss
- No play was possible due to rain

16 December 2019
17:00 PM (D/N)
Scorecard

| Swift Gallopers; 85/7 (10 overs) | v | Falcon Hunters; 87/6 (9.5 overs) |
| Ali Imran 19 (12); Murad Khan 2/18 (2 overs) | | Salman Butt 18 (10); Ali Imran 2/8 (2 overs) |

Falcon Hunters won by 4 wickets
West End Park International Cricket Stadium, Doha
Player of the match: Iqbal Hossain (Falcon Hunters)

- Falcon Hunters won the toss and elected to field

== Investigations ==
In December 2019, the International Cricket Council opened an anti-corruption investigation after match-fixing was suspected during the competition.

== See also ==
- Sport in Qatar
