= 2022–23 Malaysia Quadrangular Series =

International cricket tournament

- Dates: 15 – 23 December 2022
- Administrator: Malaysian Cricket Association
- Cricket format: Twenty20 International
- Tournament format(s): Double round-robin and final
- Host: Malaysia
- Champions: Bahrain
- Runners-up: Malaysia
- Participants: 4
- Matches: 14
- Player of the series: (Malaysia) Virandeep Singh
- Most runs: (Malaysia) Virandeep Singh (319)
- Most wickets: (Bahrain) Sarfaraz Ali (12) (Bahrain) Rizwan Butt (12)

The 2022–23 Malaysia Quadrangular Series was a Twenty20 International (T20I) cricket tournament which took place in Malaysia in December 2022. The participating teams were the hosts Malaysia along with Bahrain, Qatar and Singapore.

The last game of the round-robin, between Bahrain and Qatar, was abandoned because of rain, which meant that Bahrain progressed to the final at the expense of their opponents. Bahrain beat Malaysia by 6 wickets in the final.

== Squads ==
Bahrain	Malaysia	Qatar	Singapore
Sarfaraz Ali (c); Zeeshan Abbas; Sohail Ahmed; Waseeq Ahmed; Imran Anwar; Junaid Aziz; Ahmer Bin Nisar (wk); Haider Butt; Rizwan Butt; Danish Jasnaik; Imran Khan; Prashant Kurup (wk); Shahid Mahmood; Sathaiya Veerapathiran; Yousif Wali	Ahmad Faiz (c); Virandeep Singh (vc); Muhammad Amir; Mohamed Arief; Syed Aziz; Rizwan Haider; Khizar Hayat; Aslam Khan; Sharvin Muniandy; Anwar Rahman; Syed Rehmatullah (wk); Fitri Sham; Pavandeep Singh; Vijay Unni; Muhammad Wafiq; Zubaidi Zulkifle	Mohammed Rizlan (c, wk); Yousuf Ali; Akash Babu; Assad Borham; Zaheer Ibrahim; Ikramullah Khan; Kamran Khan; Imal Liyanage (wk); Gayan Munaweera; Mohammed Nadeem; Dharmang Patel; Syed Tameem; Muhammad Tanveer; Valeed Veetil	Janak Prakash (c); Vinoth Baskaran; Abdul Rahman Bhadelia; Surendran Chandramohan; Aman Desai (wk); Avi Dixit; Vihaan Hampihallikar; Amartya Kaul; Aaryan Modi; Akshay Puri; Manpreet Singh (wk); Sidhant Srikanth; Aryaman Sunil; Ishaan Swaney

== Round-robin ==
=== Points table ===
Pos	Team	Pld	W	L	NR	Pts	NRR
1	Malaysia	6	5	0	1	11	3.510
2	Bahrain	6	3	2	1	7	0.017
3	Qatar	6	2	2	2	6	0.410
4	Singapore	6	0	6	0	0	−3.241

Source: ESPNcricinfo

Qualified for the final
Advanced to the third place play-off

=== Fixtures ===
15 December 2022
09:30
Scorecard

Malaysia; 161/8 (20 overs)	v	Bahrain; 150/9 (20 overs)
Zubaidi Zulkifle 73 (53); Rizwan Butt 2/24 (4 overs)		Imran Anwar 44 (28); Rizwan Haider 3/22 (4 overs)

Malaysia won by 11 runs
UKM-YSD Cricket Oval, Bangi
Umpires: Tabarak Dar (HK) and Senthil Kumar (Sin)
Player of the match: Zubaidi Zulkifle (Mas)

- Malaysia won the toss and elected to bat.
- Rizwan Haider and Syed Rehmatullah (Mas) both made their T20I debuts.

15 December 2022
14:00
Scorecard

Singapore; 130/7 (20 overs)	v	Qatar; 134/5 (14.4 overs)
Aman Desai 27 (17); Mohammed Nadeem 2/13 (4 overs)		Imal Liyanage 60 (36); Janak Prakash 2/20 (3.4 overs)

Qatar won by 5 wickets
UKM-YSD Cricket Oval, Bangi
Umpires: Viswanadan Kalidas (Mas) and Denish Sevakumaran (Mas)
Player of the match: Imal Liyanage (Qat)

- Singapore won the toss and elected to bat.
- Akash Babu, Assad Borham, Ikramullah Khan, Dharmang Patel, Valeed Veetil (Qat), Abdul Rahman Bhadelia, Aaryan Modi and Ishaan Swaney (Sin) all made their T20I debuts.

16 December 2022
09:30
Scorecard

Qatar; 126/9 (20 overs)	v	Malaysia; 127/2 (14.4 overs)
Valeed Veetil 53 (44); Rizwan Haider 3/24 (4 overs)		Zubaidi Zulkifle 40 (30); Muhammad Tanveer 2/31 (3.4 overs)

Malaysia won by 8 wickets
UKM-YSD Cricket Oval, Bangi
Umpires: Tabarak Dar (HK) and Senthil Kumar (Sin)
Player of the match: Rizwan Haider (Mas)

- Qatar won the toss and elected to bat.

16 December 2022
14:00
Scorecard

Bahrain; 144/8 (20 overs)	v	Singapore; 144/7 (20 overs)
Prashant Kurup 33 (32); Janak Prakash 2/27 (4 overs)		Amartya Kaul 56 (64); Rizwan Butt 3/19 (4 overs)

Match tied
(Bahrain won the Super Over)
UKM-YSD Cricket Oval, Bangi
Umpires: Viswanadan Kalidas (Mas) and Denish Sevakumaran (Mas)
Player of the match: Rizwan Butt (Bhr)

- Bahrain won the toss and elected to bat.
- Vihaan Hampihallikar and Amartya Kaul (Sin) both made their T20I debuts.
- Super Over: Singapore 10/1, Bahrain 11/0.

18 December 2022
09:30
Scorecard

Bahrain; 164/9 (20 overs)	v	Qatar; 151/9 (20 overs)
Junaid Aziz 52 (29); Ikramullah Khan 3/41 (4 overs)		Muhammad Tanveer 88* (46); Sarfaraz Ali 4/12 (3 overs)

Bahrain won by 13 runs
UKM-YSD Cricket Oval, Bangi
Umpires: Nasir Ali (Mas) and Tabarak Dar (HK)
Player of the match: Sarfaraz Ali (Bhr)

- Qatar won the toss and elected to field.
- Syed Tameem (Qat) made his T20I debut.

18 December 2022
14:00
Scorecard

Malaysia; 207/3 (20 overs)	v	Singapore; 87 (18.5 overs)
Virandeep Singh 71 (42); Janak Prakash 2/54 (4 overs)		Aman Desai 16 (10); Sharvin Muniandy 4/21 (4 overs)

Malaysia won by 120 runs
UKM-YSD Cricket Oval, Bangi
Umpires: Viswanadan Kalidas (Mas) and Senthil Kumar (Sin)
Player of the match: Virandeep Singh (Mas)

- Malaysia won the toss and elected to bat.

19 December 2022
09:30
Scorecard

Singapore; 140/6 (20 overs)	v	Qatar; 141/2 (15 overs)
Manpreet Singh 53 (39); Mohammed Nadeem 2/18 (4 overs)		Imal Liyanage 58* (39); Vinoth Baskaran 1/21 (3 overs)

Qatar won by 8 wickets
UKM-YSD Cricket Oval, Bangi
Umpires: Nasir Ali (Mas) and Loganathan Poobalan (Mas)
Player of the match: Mohammed Rizlan (Qat)

- Qatar won the toss and elected to field.

19 December 2022
14:00
Scorecard

Bahrain; 179/5 (20 overs)	v	Malaysia; 182/3 (17.5 overs)
Haider Butt 49* (32); Fitri Sham 2/12 (4 overs)		Virandeep Singh 96 (54); Sarfaraz Ali 2/21 (3.5 overs)

Malaysia won by 7 wickets
UKM-YSD Cricket Oval, Bangi
Umpires: Tabarak Dar (HK) and Senthil Kumar (Sin)
Player of the match: Virandeep Singh (Mas)

- Bahrain won the toss and elected to bat.

21 December 2022
09:30
Scorecard

Singapore; 168 (19.5 overs)	v	Bahrain; 172/4 (18 overs)
Abdul Rahman Bhadelia 67 (55); Rizwan Butt 5/16 (3.5 overs)		Sohail Ahmed 52 (39); Vinoth Baskaran 2/23 (4 overs)

Bahrain won by 6 wickets
UKM-YSD Cricket Oval, Bangi
Umpires: Loganathan Poobalan (Mas) and Zaidan Taha (Mas)
Player of the match: Rizwan Butt (Bhr)

- Bahrain won the toss and elected to field.
- Rizwan Butt became the first bowler for Bahrain to take a hat-trick in T20Is.

21 December 2022
14:00
Scorecard

Malaysia; 61/1 (7.4 overs)	v	Qatar
Zubaidi Zulkifle 30* (25); Valeed Veetil 1/4 (0.4 overs)

No result
UKM-YSD Cricket Oval, Bangi
Umpires: Tabarak Dar (HK) and Senthil Kumar (Sin)

- Malaysia won the toss and elected to bat.
- No further play was possible due to rain.

22 December 2022
09:30
Scorecard

Malaysia; 223/4 (20 overs)	v	Singapore; 80 (16 overs)
Ahmad Faiz 86 (50); Vinoth Baskaran 2/36 (4 overs)		Manpreet Singh 26 (16); Fitri Sham 3/23 (4 overs)

Malaysia won by 143 runs
UKM-YSD Cricket Oval, Bangi
Umpires: Senthil Kumar (Sin) and Loganathan Poobalan (Mas)
Player of the match: Ahmad Faiz (Mas)

- Malaysia won the toss and elected to bat.
- Aslam Khan (Mas) made his T20I debut.

22 December 2022
14:00
Scorecard

Bahrain; 97/4 (13.4 overs)	v	Qatar
Imran Anwar 46 (40); Ikramullah Khan 1/8 (2 overs)

No result
UKM-YSD Cricket Oval, Bangi
Umpires: Tabarak Dar (HK) and Zaidan Taha (Mas)

- Qatar won the toss and elected to field.
- No further play was possible due to rain.
- Yousif Wali (Bhr) made his T20I debut.

== Third place play-off ==
23 December 2022
09:30
Scorecard

Singapore; 164/6 (18 overs)	v	Qatar; 165/1 (14 overs)
Manpreet Singh 71 (33); Ikramullah Khan 3/24 (4 overs)		Mohammed Rizlan 72* (25); Janak Prakash 1/26 (3 overs)

Qatar won by 9 wickets (DLS method)
UKM-YSD Cricket Oval, Bangi
Umpires: Viswanadan Kalidas (Mas) and Loganathan Poobalan (Mas)
Player of the match: Mohammed Rizlan (Qat)

- Qatar won the toss and elected to field.
- Qatar were set a revised target of 165 runs in 18 overs due to rain.
- Yousuf Ali (Qat) and Sidhant Srikanth (Sin) both made their T20I debuts.

== Final ==
23 December 2022
14:00
Scorecard

Malaysia; 153/9 (20 overs)	v	Bahrain; 156/4 (19.4 overs)
Zubaidi Zulkifle 34 (19); Sarfaraz Ali 4/27 (4 overs)		Sohail Ahmed 66* (44); Fitri Sham 1/22 (4 overs)

Bahrain won by 6 wickets
UKM-YSD Cricket Oval, Bangi
Umpires: Tabarak Dar (HK) and Senthil Kumar (Sin)
Player of the match: Sohail Ahmed (Bhr)

- Malaysia won the toss and elected to bat.
