= 2024 Men's T20 World Cup Asia Sub-regional Qualifier B =

Qualification tournament for the 2026 T20WC in Asia region

2024 ICC Men's T20 World Cup Asia Sub-regional Qualifier B
- Dates: 19 – 28 November 2024
- Administrator: ICC Asia
- Cricket format: Twenty20 International
- Tournament format: Round-robin tournament
- Host: Qatar
- Champions: United Arab Emirates
- Runners-up: Qatar
- Participants: 7
- Matches: 21
- Most runs: (Bahrain) Haider Ali (337)
- Most wickets: (United Arab Emirates) Dhruv Parashar (12)

The 2024 ICC Men's T20 World Cup Asia Sub-regional Qualifier B was a cricket tournament that formed part of the qualification process for the 2026 Men's T20 World Cup. It was hosted by Qatar in November 2024.

The top two sides in the tournament advanced to the regional final, where they will be joined by Nepal, Oman and Papua New Guinea, who were given a bye after having participated in the previous T20 World Cup, and two other teams from sub-regional qualifier A, along with the winners of EAP qualifiers. United Arab Emirates and Qatar secured the two places in the regional qualifier.

== Squads ==
Bahrain	Bhutan	Cambodia	Qatar	Saudi Arabia	Thailand	United Arab Emirates
Haider Ali (c); Fiaz Ahmed; Sohail Ahmed; Asif Ali; Imran Anwar; Muhammad Asif; Junaid Aziz; Shahbaz Badar; Ahmer Bin Nasir (wk); Rizwan Butt; Ali Dawood; Imran Khan; Sachin Kumar; Abdul Majid Abbasi; Muhammad Salman; Umer Toor (wk); Sameer Yousuf	Thinley Jamtsho (c); Sonam Chophel (wk); Dawa Dawa; Karma Dorji; Ranjung Mikyo Dorji; Gakul Ghalley; Sherab Loday; Suprit Pradhan; Tenjin Rabgey; Jigme Singye; Tshering Tashi (wk); Namgay Thinley; Tenzin Wangchuk; Sonam Yeshey	Gulam Murtaza (c); Etienne Beukes; Phon Bunthean; Luqman Butt; Mahaj Chadha (wk); Nived Gireesh; Lakshit Gupta; Uday Hathinjar (wk); Shah Abrar Hussain; Utkarsh Jain; Chanthoeun Rathanak; Te Senglong; Salvin Stanly; Pel Vannak	Mohammed Rizlan (c, wk); Owais Ahmed; Mohammad Ahnaff; Saqlain Arshad; Amir Farooq; Muhammad Jabir; Ikramullah Khan; Imal Liyanage (wk); Adnan Mirza; Mohammed Nadeem; Arumugaganesh Nagarajan; Himanshu Rathod; Nouman Sarwar; Muhammad Tanveer	Waji Ul Hassan (c); Abdul Manan Ali (vc, wk); Ishtiaq Ahmad; Syed Ali; Saud Ahmad; Sajid Cheema; Usman Khalid; Faisal Khan; Usman Najeeb; Ahmad Raza; Sidharth Sankar (wk); Shahzaib; Hisham Shaikh; Zain Ul Abidin; Abdul Waheed; Abdul Wahid	Austin Lazarus (c); Chaloemwong Chatphaisan; Jandre Coetzee; Sorawat Desungnoen; Anucha Kalasi; Sarawut Maliwan; Narawit Nuntarach; Chanchai Pengkumta; Satarut Rungrueang; Nitish Salekar; Yodsak Saranonnakkun; Kamron Senamontree; Nopphon Senamontree; Akshaykumar Yadav (wk)	Muhammad Waseem (c); Rahul Chopra (wk); Syed Haider (wk); Muhammad Jawadullah; Simranjeet Kang; Nilansh Keswani; Asif Khan; Ali Naseer; Dhruv Parashar; Omid Shafi Rahman; Alishan Sharafu; Junaid Siddique; Zuhaib Zubair

== Points table ==
Qualifier B standings
Pos	Team	Pld	W	L	NR	Pts	NRR	Qualification
1	United Arab Emirates	6	6	0	0	12	2.541	Advanced to the regional final
2	Qatar (H)	6	5	1	0	10	0.876	Advanced to the regional final
3	Bahrain	6	3	3	0	6	0.958	Eliminated
4	Saudi Arabia	6	3	3	0	6	0.869	Eliminated
5	Thailand	6	3	3	0	6	−1.330	Eliminated
6	Cambodia	6	1	5	0	2	−1.467	Eliminated
7	Bhutan	6	0	6	0	0	−2.367	Eliminated

Source: ESPNcricinfo
(H) Host

== Fixtures ==
19 November 2024
09:00
Scorecard

Thailand; 122/7 (20 overs)	v	Qatar; 123/5 (17.2 overs)
Akshaykumar Yadav 37 (47); Ikramullah Khan 3/17 (4 overs)		Mohammad Ahnaff 50 (47); Nopphon Senamontree 2/27 (4 overs)

Qatar won by 5 wickets
West End Park International Cricket Stadium, Doha
Umpires: Akbar Ali (UAE) and Vrinda Rathi (Ind)
Player of the match: Mohammad Ahnaff (Qat)

- Qatar won the toss and elected to field.
- Nitish Salekar (Tha) made his T20I debut.

19 November 2024
09:00
Scorecard

United Arab Emirates; 166/6 (20 overs)	v	Bhutan; 103/8 (20 overs)
Alishan Sharafu 50 (42); Tenzin Wangchuk 2/13 (3 overs)		Thinley Jamtsho 28 (24); Dhruv Parashar 4/12 (4 overs)

United Arab Emirates won by 63 runs
UDST Cricket Ground, Doha
Umpires: Buddhi Pradhan (Nep) and Izatullah Safi (Afg)
Player of the match: Muhammad Waseem (UAE)

- Bhutan won the toss and elected to field.

19 November 2024
13:30
Scorecard

Bahrain; 188/5 (20 overs)	v	Saudi Arabia; 185/9 (20 overs)
Haider Ali 67 * (51); Usman Najeeb 2/32 (4 overs)		Abdul Waheed 110 (55); Ali Dawood 2/32 (4 overs)

Bahrain won by 3 runs
West End Park International Cricket Stadium, Doha
Umpires: Akbar Ali (UAE) and Ahmed Shah Durrani (Afg)
Player of the match: Abdul Waheed (Sau)

- Saudi Arabia won the toss and elected to field.
- Sidharth Sankar (Sau) made his T20I debut.
- Abdul Waheed (Sau) scored his first century in T20Is.

20 November 2024
09:00
Scorecard

Thailand; 178/5 (20 overs)	v	Cambodia; 162/7 (20 overs)
Chaloemwong Chatphaisan 42 (29); Mahaj Chadha 2/30 (4 overs)		Luqman Butt 60 (31); Sarawut Maliwan 2/20 (4 overs)

Thailand won by 16 runs
West End Park International Cricket Stadium, Doha
Umpires: Shivani Mishra (Qat) and Buddhi Pradhan (Nep)
Player of the match: Jandre Coetzee (Tha)

- Cambodia won the toss and elected to field.
- Nived Gireesh (Cam) made his T20I debut.

20 November 2024
09:00
Scorecard

Bhutan; 111 (20 overs)	v	Qatar; 112/4 (16.4 overs)
Gakul Ghalley 21 (15); Amir Farooq 3/16 (4 overs)		Imal Liyanage 51 (28); Sonam Yeshey 2/18 (4 overs)

Qatar won by 6 wickets
UDST Cricket Ground, Doha
Umpires: Ahmed Shah Durrani (Afg) and Vrinda Rathi (Ind)
Player of the match: Amir Farooq (Qat)

- Qatar won the toss and elected to field.

20 November 2024
13:30
Scorecard

United Arab Emirates; 162/5 (20 overs)	v	Saudi Arabia; 145/6 (20 overs)
Rahul Chopra 58 (36); Usman Khalid 2/25 (4 overs)		Abdul Manan Ali 33 (28); Dhruv Parashar 2/11 (3 overs)

United Arab Emirates won by 17 runs
West End Park International Cricket Stadium, Doha
Umpires: Shivani Mishra (Qat) and Izatullah Safi (Afg)
Player of the match: Rahul Chopra (UAE)

- United Arab Emirates won the toss and elected to bat.
- Simranjeet Kang (UAE) made his T20I debut.

22 November 2024
09:00
Scorecard

Cambodia; 132/5 (20 overs)	v	United Arab Emirates; 134/5 (16.2 overs)
Mahaj Chadha 32 (35); Muhammad Jawadullah 3/19 (4 overs)		Syed Haider 47 (38); Mahaj Chadha 2/40 (3 overs)

United Arab Emirates won by 5 wickets
West End Park International Cricket Stadium, Doha
Umpires: Ahmed Shah Durrani (Afg) and Vrinda Rathi (Ind)
Player of the match: Muhammad Jawadullah (UAE)

- United Arab Emirates won the toss and elected to field.

22 November 2024
09:00
Scorecard

Bahrain; 102/7 (20 overs)	v	Thailand; 103/8 (19.2 overs)
Fiaz Ahmed 39 (51); Nitish Salekar 2/17 (4 overs)		Yodsak Saranonnakkun 22 (18); Ali Dawood 4/22 (4 overs)

Thailand won by 2 wickets
UDST Cricket Ground, Doha
Umpires: Shivani Mishra (Qat) and Izatullah Safi (Afg)
Player of the match: Nitish Salekar (Tha)

- Bahrain won the toss and elected to bat.

22 November 2024
13:30
Scorecard

Saudi Arabia; 170/7 (20 overs)	v	Bhutan; 85/8 (20 overs)
Waji Ul Hassan 52 (30); Ranjung Mikyo Dorji 2/25 (3 overs)		Jigme Singye 35 (41); Ishtiaq Ahmad 2/2 (2 overs)

Saudi Arabia won by 85 runs
UDST Cricket Ground, Doha
Umpires: Akbar Ali (UAE) and Shivani Mishra (Qat)
Player of the match: Waji Ul Hassan (Sau)

- Bhutan won the toss and elected to field.

23 November 2024
09:00
Scorecard

Bahrain; 175/7 (20 overs)	v	Bhutan; 85/7 (20 overs)
Haider Ali 68 (47); Tenzin Wangchuk 4/41 (4 overs)		Ranjung Mikyo Dorji 23* (29); Rizwan Butt 3/12 (4 overs)

Bahrain won by 90 runs
West End Park International Cricket Stadium, Doha
Umpires: Ahmed Shah Durrani (Afg) and Shivani Mishra (Qat)
Player of the match: Haider Ali (Bhr)

- Bhutan won the toss and elected to field.

23 November 2024
09:00
Scorecard

United Arab Emirates; 192/7 (20 overs)	v	Thailand; 37 (12.2 overs)
Rahul Chopra 80 (51); Chanchai Pengkumta 2/29 (2 overs)		Sorawat Desungnoen 11* (23); Dhruv Parashar 3/5 (3 overs)

United Arab Emirates won by 155 runs
UDST Cricket Ground, Doha
Umpires: Buddhi Pradhan (Nep) and Vrinda Rathi (Ind)
Player of the match: Rahul Chopra (UAE)

- United Arab Emirates won the toss and elected to bat.

23 November 2024
13:30
Scorecard

Qatar; 170/7 (20 overs)	v	Cambodia; 122/8 (20 overs)
Imal Liyanage 86 (54); Utkarsh Jain 2/32 (3 overs)		Lakshit Gupta 49 (46); Mohammed Aslam 3/20 (4 overs)

Qatar won by 48 runs
UDST Cricket Ground, Doha
Umpires: Buddhi Pradhan (Nep) and Izatullah Safi (Afg)
Player of the match: Imal Liyanage (Qat)

- Qatar won the toss and elected to bat.
- Owais Ahmed and Arumugaganesh Nagarajan (Qat) both made their T20I debuts.

25 November 2024
09:00
Scorecard

Qatar; 185/2 (20 overs)	v	Bahrain; 170/9 (20 overs)
Imal Liyanage 78 (49); Rizwan Butt 1/33 (4 overs)		Haider Ali 68 (42); Amir Farooq 5/32 (4 overs)

Qatar won by 15 runs
West End Park International Cricket Stadium, Doha
Umpires: Akbar Ali (UAE) and Vrinda Rathi (Ind)
Player of the match: Amir Farooq (Qat)

- Bahrain won the toss and elected to field.
- Amir Farooq became the first player for Qatar to take a five-wicket haul in men's T20Is.

25 November 2024
09:00
Scorecard

Cambodia; 161/6 (20 overs)	v	Saudi Arabia; 164/5 (15.2 overs)
Lakshit Gupta 62 (45); Usman Najeeb 2/30 (4 overs)		Faisal Khan 101 (42); Nived Gireesh 3/21 (2 overs)

Saudi Arabia won by 5 wickets
UDST Cricket Ground, Doha
Umpires: Buddhi Pradhan (Nep) and Izatullah Safi (Afg)
Player of the match: Faisal Khan (Sau)

- Saudi Arabia won the toss and elected to field.
- Faisal Khan (Sau) scored his first century in T20Is.

25 November 2024
13:30
Scorecard

Thailand; 117/5 (20 overs)	v	Bhutan; 110/6 (20 overs)
Nitish Salekar 33 (36); Suprit Pradhan 2/25 (4 overs)		Ranjung Mikyo Dorji 51 (39); Nitish Salekar 2/7 (3 overs)

Thailand won by 7 runs
West End Park International Cricket Stadium, Doha
Umpires: Akbar Ali (UAE) and Ahmed Shah Durrani (Afg)
Player of the match: Nitish Salekar (Tha)

- Thailand won the toss and elected to bat.

26 November 2024
09:00
Scorecard

Thailand; 133/7 (20 overs)	v	Saudi Arabia; 136/5 (18.4 overs)
Akshaykumar Yadav 60 (51); Abdul Wahid 2/10 (1 over)		Sidharth Sankar 37 (37); Sarawut Maliwan 2/21 (3.4 overs)

Saudi Arabia won by 5 wickets
West End Park International Cricket Stadium, Doha
Umpires: Ahmed Shah Durrani (Afg) and Izatullah Safi (Afg)
Player of the match: Zain Ul Abidin (Sau)

- Saudi Arabia won the toss and elected to field.
- Saud Ahmad (Sau) made his T20I debut.

26 November 2024
09:00
Scorecard

Bahrain; 174/6 (20 overs)	v	Cambodia; 125 (15.5 overs)
Haider Ali 79* (38); Shah Abrar Hussain 1/21 (3 overs)		Luqman Butt 79 (40); Rizwan Butt 5/20 (4 overs)

Bahrain won by 49 runs
UDST Cricket Ground, Doha
Umpires: Shivani Mishra (Qat) and Vrinda Rathi (Ind)
Player of the match: Rizwan Butt (Bhr)

- Cambodia won the toss and elected to field.

26 November 2024
13:30
Scorecard

United Arab Emirates; 206/3 (20 overs)	v	Qatar; 177 (20 overs)
Muhammad Waseem 81 (46); Muhammad Jabir 1/37 (4 overs)		Ikramullah Khan 53 (34); Junaid Siddique 3/32 (4 overs)

United Arab Emirates won by 29 runs
West End Park International Cricket Stadium, Doha
Umpires: Buddhi Pradhan (Nep) and Izatullah Safi (Afg)
Player of the match: Muhammad Waseem (UAE)

- United Arab Emirates won the toss and elected to bat.

28 November 2024
09:00
Scorecard

Bhutan; 123/7 (20 overs)	v	Cambodia; 126/5 (18.4 overs)
Jigme Singye 46 (48); Gulam Murtaza 3/19 (4 overs)		Etienne Beukes 31* (19); Jigme Singye 2/13 (2 overs)

Cambodia won by 5 wickets
West End Park International Cricket Stadium, Doha
Umpires: Akbar Ali (UAE) and Shivani Mishra (Qat)
Player of the match: Gulam Murtaza (Cam)

- Cambodia won the toss and elected to field.

28 November 2024
09:00
Scorecard

Saudi Arabia; 165/6 (20 overs)	v	Qatar; 166/4 (17.5 overs)
Abdul Waheed 34 (27); Muhammad Jabir 3/32 (4 overs)		Mohammad Ahnaff 50 (34); Hisham Shaikh 3/22 (2 overs)

Qatar won by 6 wickets
UDST Cricket Ground, Doha
Umpires: Buddhi Pradhan (Nep) and Vrinda Rathi (Ind)
Player of the match: Mohammad Ahnaff (Qat)

- Qatar won the toss and elected to field.

28 November 2024
13:30
Scorecard

Bahrain; 135/7 (20 overs)	v	United Arab Emirates; 138/2 (19.3 overs)
Haider Ali 35 (31); Junaid Siddique 3/23 (4 overs)		Alishan Sharafu 77* (58); Abdul Majid Abbasi 1/14 (4 overs)

United Arab Emirates won by 8 wickets
UDST Cricket Ground, Doha
Umpires: Ahmed Shah Durrani (Afg) and Buddhi Pradhan (Nep)
Player of the match: Alishan Sharafu (UAE)

- Bahrain won the toss and elected to bat.
