= 2021 Men's T20 World Cup Asia qualifier =

Cricket tournament

The 2021 ICC Men's T20 World Cup Asia Qualifier was a tournament that was played as part of qualification process for the 2022 ICC Men's T20 World Cup in October 2021. In April 2018, the International Cricket Council (ICC) granted full international status to Twenty20 men's matches played between member sides from 1 January 2019 onwards. Therefore, all the matches in the Regional Qualifiers were played as Twenty20 Internationals (T20Is). The Asia Qualifier consisted of two sub-regional groups, A and B, with the groups being played in Qatar and Malaysia respectively. The winners of each sub-regional group progressed to one of two global qualifiers. On 2 September 2021, the ICC announced that Group A had been moved from Kuwait to Qatar.

Originally, the qualifiers were scheduled to be played between March and September 2020. However, on 24 March 2020, the International Cricket Council (ICC) confirmed that all ICC qualifying events scheduled to take place before 30 June 2020 had been postponed due to the COVID-19 pandemic. In December 2020, the ICC updated the qualification pathway following the disruption from the pandemic. In March 2021, the Group A qualifier was postponed again, and was moved back to October 2021. In May 2021, the Group B qualifier was postponed to November 2021 due to the pandemic. However, in October 2021, the ICC cancelled the Group B tournament due to the COVID-19 pandemic, with Hong Kong progressing to the next stage as the highest-ranked team. Bahrain won Group A to progress to the Global Qualifiers, finishing just ahead of Qatar on net run rate.

== Group A ==
2021 ICC T20 World Cup Asian Western Sub-Regional Qualifier
- Dates: 23 – 29 October 2021
- Administrator: ICC Asia
- Cricket format: T20I
- Host: Qatar
- Champions: Bahrain
- Runners-up: Qatar
- Participants: 5
- Matches: 10
- Player of the series: (Kuwait) Mohammed Aslam
- Most runs: (Bahrain) Muhammad Younis (159) (Bahrain) Sarfaraz Ali (159)
- Most wickets: (Kuwait) Mohammed Aslam (9)

=== Squads ===
The following teams and squads were named for the tournament:

Bahrain	Kuwait	Maldives	Qatar	Saudi Arabia
Anasim Khan (c); Fiaz Ahmed; Waseeq Ahmed; Imran Ali (wk); Sarfaraz Ali; Ammad Uddin; Imran Anwar; Junaid Aziz; Haider Butt; Prashant Kurup (wk); Shahid Mahmood; Abdul Majid; Sathaiya Veerapathiran; Muhammad Younis	Mohammed Aslam (c); Nawaf Ahmed; Meet Bhavsar (wk); Naveed Fakhr; Adnan Idrees; Muhammad Kashif; Shiraz Khan; Wasantha Kumaranayaka; Sayed Monib; Ravija Sandaruwan; Morshed Mostafa Sarwar; Edson Silva; Bilal Tahir; Usman Waheed (wk)	Mohamed Mahfooz (c); Azyan Farhath (vc); Umar Adam; Mohamed Azzam (wk); Ahmed Hassan; Ibrahim Hassan; Ali Ivan; Wedage Malinda; Ameel Mauroof; Ibrahim Nashath; Hassan Rasheed; Mohamed Rishwan; Ibrahim Rizan; Leem Shafeeg	Iqbal Hussain (c); Mohammed Rizlan (vc, wk); Andri Berenger; Zaheer Ibrahim; Ikramullah Khan; Kamran Khan; Imal Liyanage; Gayan Munaweera; Muhammad Murad; Mohammed Nadeem; Dharmang Patel; Musawar Shah; Muhammad Tanveer; Sandun Withanage	Abdul Waheed (c); Imran Arif (vc); Abdul Wahid; Ishtiaq Ahmad; Basit Ali; Sarfraz Butt (wk); Sajid Cheema; Usman Khalid; Faisal Khan; Muhammad Nadeem; Amir Shahzad; Hisham Sheikh; Imran Yousaf; Zain Ul Abidin

=== Points table ===
Pos	Team	Pld	W	L	NR	Pts	NRR
1	Bahrain	4	3	1	0	6	1.662
2	Qatar	4	3	1	0	6	1.569
3	Kuwait	4	2	2	0	4	0.899
4	Saudi Arabia	4	2	2	0	4	0.303
5	Maldives	4	0	4	0	0	−4.088

Source: ESPN Cricinfo

Advanced to the Global qualifier

=== Fixtures ===
23 October 2021
09:00
Scorecard

Qatar; 133/5 (20 overs)	v	Bahrain; 134/2 (13.1 overs)
Zaheer Ibrahim 33* (22); Abdul Majid 2/23 (4 overs)		Muhammad Younis 82* (44); Muhammad Tanveer 1/20 (4 overs)

Bahrain won by 8 wickets
West End Park International Cricket Stadium, Doha
Umpires: Akbar Ali (UAE) and Buddhi Pradhan (Nep)
Player of the match: Muhammad Younis (Bhr)

- Bahrain won the toss and elected to field.
- Andri Berenger, Muhammad Murad (Qat), Waseeq Ahmed and Haider Butt (Bhr) all made their T20I debuts.

23 October 2021
13:10
Scorecard

Maldives; 98/9 (20 overs)	v	Saudi Arabia; 101/3 (15.1 overs)
Ibrahim Nashath 20* (50); Imran Yousaf 1/6 (3 overs)		Faisal Khan 41 (24); Umar Adam 2/13 (4 overs)

Saudi Arabia won by 7 wickets
West End Park International Cricket Stadium, Doha
Umpires: Akbar Ali (UAE) and Shivani Mishra (Qat)
Player of the match: Faisal Khan (Sau)

- Maldives won the toss and elected to bat.
- Ishtiaq Ahmad, Imran Arif, Amir Shahzad, Hisham Sheikh and Zain Ul Abidin (Sau) all made their T20I debuts.

24 October 2021
09:00
Scorecard

Bahrain; 124/8 (20 overs)	v	Kuwait; 129/4 (11.3 overs)
Sarfaraz Ali 28 (12); Mohammed Aslam 3/13 (4 overs)		Ravija Sandaruwan 49 (31); Junaid Aziz 2/4 (1 over)

Kuwait won by 6 wickets
West End Park International Cricket Stadium, Doha
Umpires: Shivani Mishra (Qat) and Buddhi Pradhan (Nep)
Player of the match: Mohammed Aslam (Kuw)

- Kuwait won the toss and elected to field.
- Edson Silva (Kuw) made his T20I debut.

24 October 2021
13:10
Scorecard

Qatar; 154/6 (20 overs)	v	Maldives; 56 (18.5 overs)
Mohammed Rizlan 62 (46); Umar Adam 3/31 (4 overs)		Ahmed Hassan 18 (28); Mohammed Nadeem 4/10 (4 overs)

Qatar won by 98 runs
West End Park International Cricket Stadium, Doha
Umpires: Akbar Ali (UAE) and Buddhi Pradhan (Nep)
Player of the match: Mohammed Rizlan (Qat)

- Maldives won the toss and elected to field.

25 October 2021
09:00
Scorecard

Kuwait; 146/8 (20 overs)	v	Saudi Arabia; 149/6 (19 overs)
Mohammed Aslam 55 (41); Imran Arif 2/14 (4 overs)		Sajid Cheema 52 (30); Mohammed Aslam 3/38 (4 overs)

Saudi Arabia won by 4 wickets
West End Park International Cricket Stadium, Doha
Umpires: Akbar Ali (UAE) and Buddhi Pradhan (Nep)
Player of the match: Sajid Cheema (Sau)

- Saudi Arabia won the toss and elected to field.
- Usman Khalid (Sau) made his T20I debut.

27 October 2021
09:00
Scorecard

Maldives; 88/9 (20 overs)	v	Bahrain; 93/3 (7 overs)
Umar Adam 31 (22); Waseeq Ahmed 3/14 (4 overs)		Muhammad Younis 31 (13); Ibrahim Hassan 2/39 (3 overs)

Bahrain won by 7 wickets
West End Park International Cricket Stadium, Doha
Umpires: Akbar Ali (UAE) and Shivani Mishra (Qat)
Player of the match: Anasim Khan (Bhr)

- Bahrain won the toss and elected to field.
- Prashant Kurup (Bhr) made his T20I debut.

27 October 2021
13:10
Scorecard

Saudi Arabia; 130/9 (20 overs)	v	Qatar; 134/5 (19.4 overs)
Faisal Khan 42 (29); Muhammad Murad 3/17 (3 overs)		Imal Liyanage 44 (45); Imran Arif 1/12 (4 overs)

Qatar won by 5 wickets
West End Park International Cricket Stadium, Doha
Umpires: Akbar Ali (UAE) and Buddhi Pradhan (Nep)
Player of the match: Imal Liyanage (Qat)

- Qatar won the toss and elected to field.

28 October 2021
09:00
Scorecard

Maldives; 103 (20 overs)	v	Kuwait; 107/5 (12 overs)
Ahmed Hassan 42 (38); Adnan Idrees 3/17 (4 overs)		Edson Silva 58 (29); Mohamed Mahfooz 2/14 (2 overs)

Kuwait won by 5 wickets
West End Park International Cricket Stadium, Doha
Umpires: Shivani Mishra (Qat) and Buddhi Pradhan (Nep)
Player of the match: Edson Silva (Kuw)

- Kuwait won the toss and elected to field.

28 October 2021
13:10
Scorecard

Bahrain; 179/9 (20 overs)	v	Saudi Arabia; 161/6 (20 overs)
Sarfaraz Ali 67 (45); Abdul Wahid 2/25 (4 overs)		Abdul Wahid 72* (40); Anasim Khan 2/22 (4 overs)

Bahrain won by 18 runs
West End Park International Cricket Stadium, Doha
Umpires: Shivani Mishra (Qat) and Buddhi Pradhan (Nep)
Player of the match: Sarfaraz Ali (Bhr)

- Saudi Arabia won the toss and elected to field.

29 October 2021
13:10
Scorecard

Kuwait; 126/9 (20 overs)	v	Qatar; 127/8 (11.5 overs)
Meet Bhavsar 25 (17); Musawar Shah 3/18 (4 overs)		Andri Berenger 37 (16); Shiraz Khan 3/33 (3 overs)

Qatar won by 2 wickets
West End Park International Cricket Stadium, Doha
Umpires: Akbar Ali (UAE) and Buddhi Pradhan (Nep)
Player of the match: Musawar Shah (Qat)

- Kuwait won the toss and elected to bat.

== Group B ==
2021 ICC T20 World Cup Asian Eastern Sub-Regional Qualifier
- Dates: 9 – 15 November 2021
- Administrator: ICC Asia
- Cricket format: Twenty20 International
- Host: Malaysia
- Participants: 6

For the original schedule, Singapore were placed in Group B. However, when the revised schedule was published by the ICC, Singapore had been promoted to the Global Qualifier at the expense of Hong Kong, due to a recalculation of the T20I team rankings. On 11 October 2021, the ICC cancelled the Group B tournament due to the COVID-19 pandemic, with Hong Kong progressing to the next stage as the highest-ranked team.

The following teams were scheduled to compete in Group B:

- Bhutan
- China
- Hong Kong
- Malaysia
- Myanmar
- Thailand
