= Afghan cricket team in Qatar in 2025–26 =

International cricket tour

	Qatar	Afghanistan
- Date: 11 November 2025
Captains	Mirza Mohammed Baig	Darwish Rasooli

Twenty20 International series
- Results: Afghanistan won the 1-match series 1–0
Most runs	Mirza Mohammed Baig (26)	Darwish Rasooli (66)
Most wickets	Owais Ahmed (4)	Abdullah Ahmadzai (2); Farmanullah Safi (2)

The Afghanistan cricket team toured Qatar in November 2025 to play the Qatar cricket team. The tour consisted of three Twenty20 (T20) matches, the last of which played with official Twenty20 International (T20I) status. All the matches were played at West End Park International Cricket Stadium at Doha. These matches were played to prepare Afghanistan for the 2025 Asia Cup Rising Stars held at the same venue.

The series marked Qatar's first-ever matches against a full member team. It also marked Afghanistan's first T20I match in Qatar, while they have played against Netherlands at the same venue in an ODI series in 2022.

The first match of the series had a delayed start due to "technical problem". Initially, there was confusion regarding the T20I status of these matches with contradicting reports from the boards; it was confirmed that only the final match of the series would have T20I status.

== Squads ==
Qatar	Afghanistan
Mirza Mohammed Baig (c); Owais Ahmed; Zubair Ali; Saqlain Arshad; Muhammad Asim; Amir Farooq; Shahzaib Jamil (wk); Ikramullah Khan; Imal Liyanage (wk); Daniel Louis; Shariq Munir; Muhammad Murad; Mujeeb-ur-Rehman; Muhammad Tanveer; Arif Nasir Uddin	Darwish Rasooli (c); Sediqullah Atal (vc); Qais Ahmad; Ijaz Ahmad Ahmadzai; Abdullah Ahmadzai; Zubaid Akbari; Faridoon Dawoodzai; Farmanullah; Allah Mohammad Ghazanfar; Mohammad Ishaq (wk); Nangialai Kharoti; Imran Mir; Noor ul Rahman; Rahmanullah; Bilal Sami

== Tour matches ==
=== 1st Match ===
9 November 2025
17:30 (D/N)
Scorecard

Afghanistan A 173/4 (20 overs)	v	Qatar; 108 (18.3 overs)
Darwish Rasooli 60* (52); Mujeeb-ur-Rehman 2/21		Mohammad Ahnaff 17 (17); Bilal Sami 4/24 (3.3 overs)

Afghanistan A won by 65 runs
West End Park International Cricket Stadium, Doha
Umpires: Mohammad Nasim (Qat) and Tahir Mehmood (Qat)

- Qatar won the toss and elected to field first.

=== 2nd Match ===
10 November 2025
17:30 (D/N)
Scorecard

Afghanistan A 155/5 (20 overs)	v	Qatar; 135/8 (20 overs)
Imran Mir 50 (40); Ikramullah Khan 3/28 (4 overs)		Zubair Ali 52 (53); Abdullah Ahmadzai 3/11 (3 overs)

Afghanistan A won by 20 runs
West End Park International Cricket Stadium, Doha
Umpires: Asghar Ali Bhatti (Qat) and Abdul Salam (Qat)

- Qatar won the toss and elected to field.

== Only T20I ==
11 November 2025
17:30 (D/N)
Scorecard

Afghanistan; 149/8 (20 overs)	v	Qatar; 124/7 (20 overs)
Darwish Rasooli 66 (37); Owais Ahmed 4/29 (4 overs)		Mirza Mohammed Baig 26 (21); Farmanullah Safi 2/19 (3 overs)

Afghanistan won by 25 runs
West End Park International Cricket Stadium, Doha
Umpires: Abdul Jabbar (Qat) and Muhammad Usman (Qat)
Player of the match: Darwish Rasooli (Afg)

- Afghanistan won the toss and elected to bat.
- Bilal Sami, Farmanullah and Imran Mir (Afg) all made their T20I debuts.
- Owais Ahmed (Qat) took his second hat-trick in T20Is.
