= Qatar Cricket Association =

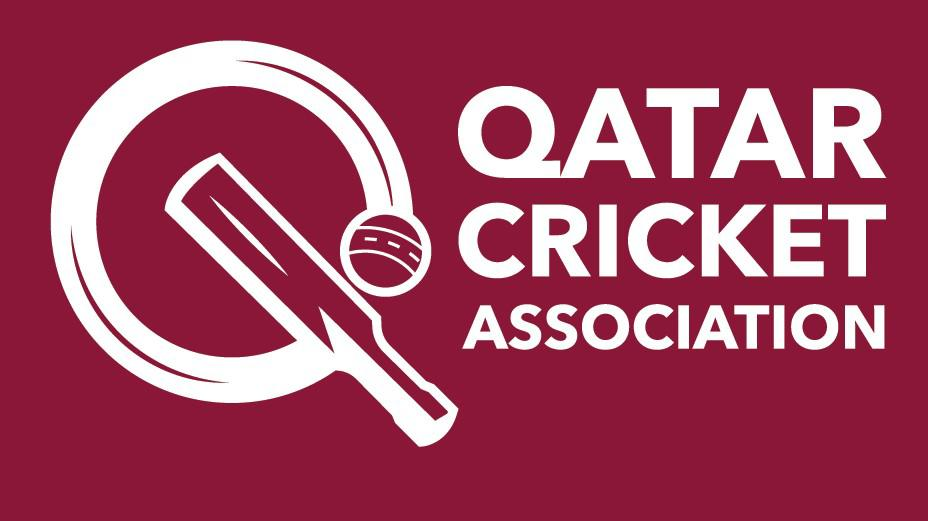
- Sport: Cricket
- Jurisdiction: National
- Founded: 2017; 9 years ago
- Affiliation: International Cricket Council
- Regional affiliation: Asian Cricket Council
- Headquarters: Doha, Qatar
- President: Sheikh Abdulaziz bin Saud Al Thani
- Chairman: Awais Malik
- Chairperson: Faisal Javed
- CEO: Khalid Al Suwaidi
- Secretary: Mohammed Rizlan
- Coach: Toby Bailey
- Sponsor: Qatar Airways

Official website
- www.qatarcricketassociation.org
- (Qatar)

Qatar Cricket Association is the official governing body of the sport of cricket in Qatar. Its current headquarters is located in Doha, Qatar. Qatar Cricket Association is Qatar's representative at the International Cricket Council and is an associate member and has been a member of that body since 2000. It is also a member of the Asian Cricket Council.

Qatar recently took part in the U-19 Asia Cup held in Malaysia.

The Qatar Cricket Association hosted the country’s first T10 League by the end of 2019. Former Pakistan captain Shahid Afridi was the brand ambassador for the tournament, approved by the ICC.

== Home ground ==
West End Park International Cricket Stadium is a home ground of team located in Doha. This is the first cricket stadium in Qatar. In June 2013, the ground was opened for cricket with opening of the Grand Mall Hypermarket on its premises. The stadium can seat 13,000. In December 2013, it was announced the hosting of first-ever triangular women’s One-day and Twenty20 championship in Qatar in January 2014. Women’s international teams from the Pakistan, South Africa and Ireland participated in the seven championship matches. This was the first championship ever to be sanctioned by the International Cricket Council.

In 2015, the stadium was selected to host 1st edition of Pakistan Super League matches which was played in February, 2016.

== See also ==
- Qatar national cricket team
- Qatar women's national cricket team
- Qatar national under-19 cricket team
- Qatar women's national under-19 cricket team
