= 2019 ACC Western Region T20 =

International cricket tournament

- Dates: 20 – 24 January 2019
- Cricket format: Twenty20 International
- Tournament format(s): Round Robin, Final
- Host: Oman
- Champions: Saudi Arabia
- Runners-up: Qatar
- Participants: 5
- Matches: 11
- Player of the series: (Qatar) Tamoor Sajjad
- Most runs: (Kuwait) Ravija Sandaruwan (177)
- Most wickets: (Qatar) Tamoor Sajjad (10)

The 2019 ACC Western Region T20 was a Twenty20 International (T20I) cricket tournament held in Oman from 20 to 24 January 2019. The five participating teams were Bahrain, Kuwait, Maldives, Qatar and Saudi Arabia. The matches were all played at the Al Amerat Cricket Stadium in Muscat. All participating nations made their T20I debuts during the tournament, following the decision of the ICC to grant full Twenty20 International status to all its members from 1 January 2019. Saudi Arabia defeated Qatar – who had been unbeaten in the round-robin stage – in the final by 7 wickets. Qatar's Tamoor Sajjad was named the player of the tournament for his 10 wickets in four matches.

== Round-robin ==
=== Points table ===
Team	P	W	L	T	NR	Pts	NRR
Qatar	4	4	0	0	0	8	+1.694
Saudi Arabia	4	2	2	0	0	4	+0.489
Bahrain	4	2	2	0	0	4	–0.035
Kuwait	4	2	2	0	0	4	–0.060
Maldives	4	0	4	0	0	0	–2.075

=== Matches ===
20 January 2019
09:30
Scorecard

Bahrain; 176/4 (20 overs)	v	Saudi Arabia; 135/9 (20 overs)
Imran Ali 58 (53); Usman Ali 1/24 (4 overs)		Muhammad Naeem 42 (36); Babar Ali 2/18 (3 overs)

Bahrain won by 41 runs
Oman Cricket Academy Ground Turf 1, Muscat
Umpires: Afzalkhan Pathan (Oma) and Zahid Usman (Kuw)
Player of the match: Sarfaraz Ali (Bhr)

- Saudi Arabia won the toss and elected to field.
- Fiaz Ahmed, Babar Ali, Imran Ali, Sarfaraz Ali, Imran Anwar, Shahbaz Badar, Tahir Dar, Adil Hanif, Anasim Khan, Ammad Uddin, Qasim Zia (Bhr), Mohammad Adnan, Shoaib Ali, Usman Ali, Sajid Cheema, Muhammad Hamayun, Ibrarul Haq, Faisal Khan, Muhammad Nadeem, Muhammad Naeem, Abbas Saad and Abdul Wahid (Sau) all made their T20I debuts.

20 January 2019
09:30
Scorecard

Maldives; 102 (18.4 overs)	v	Kuwait; 103/2 (10.3 overs)
Mohamed Rishwan 25 (23); Imran Ali 3/16 (3 overs)		Ravija Sandaruwan 68* (36); Ameel Mauroof 1/11 (3 overs)

Kuwait won by 8 wickets
Oman Cricket Academy Ground Turf 2, Muscat
Umpires: Vinod Babu (Oma) and Shivani Mishra (Qat)
Player of the match: Ravija Sandaruwan (Kuw)

- Kuwait won the toss and elected to field.
- Fiaz Ahmad, Imran Ali, Mohammad Amin, Mohammed Asghar, Meet Bhavsar, Muhammad Kashif, Wasantha Kumaranayaka, Arjun Makesh, Ravija Sandaruwan, Morshed Mostafa Sarwar, Diju Sheeli (Kuw), Umar Adam, Mohamed Azzam, Muaviath Ganee, Ahmed Hassan, Ibrahim Hassan, Mohamed Mahfooz, Ameel Mauroof, Ibrahim Nashath, Hassan Rasheed, Mohamed Rishwan and Shafee Saeed (Mdv) all made their T20I debuts.

21 January 2019
09:30
Scorecard

Maldives; 141/4 (20 overs)	v	Bahrain; 142/8 (18.4 overs)
Mohamed Rishwan 54 (52); Imran Anwar 2/24 (4 overs)		Sarfaraz Ali 59 (35); Ibrahim Hassan 5/24 (3.4 overs)

Bahrain won by 2 wickets
Oman Cricket Academy Ground Turf 1, Muscat
Umpires: Osama Saad Alnadwi (Sau) and Zahid Usman (Kuw)
Player of the match: Sarfaraz Ali (Bhr)

- Maldives won the toss and elected to bat.
- Ibrahim Hassan became the first bowler for Maldives to take a five-wicket haul in T20Is.

21 January 2019
09:30
Scorecard

Saudi Arabia; 126 (20 overs)	v	Qatar; 127/6 (15.3 overs)
Sajid Cheema 47 (41); Tamoor Sajjad 3/11 (4 overs)		Faisal Javed 43 (26); Muhammad Nadeem 3/16 (3 overs)

Qatar won by 4 wickets
Oman Cricket Academy Ground Turf 2, Muscat
Umpires: Rahul Asher (Oma) and Vinod Babu (Oma)
Player of the match: Tamoor Sajjad (Qat)

- Qatar won the toss and elected to field.
- Iqbal Hussain, Zaheer Ibrahim, Inam-ul-Haq, Faisal Javed, Kamran Khan, Awais Malik, Mohammed Nadeem, Mohammed Rizlan, Tamoor Sajjad, Nouman Sarwar and Muhammad Tanveer (Qat) all made their T20I debuts.

22 January 2019
09:30
Scorecard

Qatar; 155/6 (20 overs)	v	Kuwait; 155/8 (20 overs)
Muhammad Tanveer 53* (39); Imran Ali 3/26 (4 overs)		Muhammad Kashif 53 (43); Awais Malik 1/21 (3 overs)

Match tied
(Qatar won the Super Over)
Oman Cricket Academy Ground Turf 1, Muscat
Umpires: Osama Saad Alnadwi (Sau) and Rahul Asher (Oma)
Player of the match: Muhammad Tanveer (Qat)

- Kuwait won the toss and elected to field.

22 January 2019
09:30
Scorecard

Maldives; 139/7 (20 overs)	v	Saudi Arabia; 140/4 (17 overs)
Mohamed Rishwan 67 (54); Ibrarul Haq 3/28 (4 overs)		Ibrarul Haq 49 (26); Ibrahim Hassan 2/26 (4 overs)

Saudi Arabia won by 6 wickets
Oman Cricket Academy Ground Turf 2, Muscat
Umpires: Shivani Mishra (Qat) and Afzalkhan Pathan (Oma)
Player of the match: Ibrarul Haq (Sau)

- Maldives won the toss and elected to bat.
- Mihusan Hamid, Ibrahim Rizan (Mdv), Nawazish Jezuli, Ibrahim Khan and Shamsudheen Purat (Sau) all made their T20I debuts.

23 January 2019
09:30
Scorecard

Maldives; 134/9 (20 overs)	v	Qatar; 135/2 (14.5 overs)
Ahmed Hassan 53 (45); Awais Malik 3/19 (4 overs)		Inam-ul-Haq 73* (50); Ahmed Hassan 1/8 (1 over)

Qatar won by 8 wickets
Oman Cricket Academy Ground Turf 1, Muscat
Umpires: Afzalkhan Pathan (Oma) and Zahid Usman (Kuw)
Player of the match: Inam-ul-Haq (Qat)

- Maldives won the toss and elected to bat.
- Hassan Rasheed (Mdv) became the second batsman to be given out for obstructing the field in a T20I.

23 January 2019
09:30
Scorecard

Bahrain; 188/3 (20 overs)	v	Kuwait; 189/3 (19.1 overs)
Fiaz Ahmed 62* (37); Muhammad Kashif 1/25 (3 overs)		Ravija Sandaruwan 103 (59); Muhammad Rafique 1/32 (3 overs)

Kuwait won by 7 wickets
Oman Cricket Academy Ground Turf 2, Muscat
Umpires: Rahul Asher (Oma) and Vinod Babu (Oma)
Player of the match: Ravija Sandaruwan (Kuw)

- Kuwait won the toss and elected to field.
- Muhammad Rafique (Bhr) and Jandu Hamoud (Kuw) both made their T20I debuts.
- Ravija Sandaruwan became the first batsman for Kuwait to score a century in T20Is.

24 January 2019
09:30
Scorecard

Kuwait; 135/8 (20 overs)	v	Saudi Arabia; 137/3 (9.1 overs)
Arjun Makesh 57 (39); Ibrarul Haq 2/18 (4 overs)		Faisal Khan 83* (28); Muhammad Kashif 2/22 (1.1 overs)

Saudi Arabia won by 7 wickets
Oman Cricket Academy Ground Turf 1, Muscat
Umpires: Vinod Babu (Oma) and Shivani Mishra (Qat)
Player of the match: Faisal Khan (Sau)

- Saudi Arabia won the toss and elected to field.
- Yasar Idrees (Kuw) made his T20I debut.

24 January 2019
09:30
Scorecard

Qatar; 205/5 (20 overs)	v	Bahrain; 157 (18.2 overs)
Faisal Javed 60 (29); Babar Ali 2/33 (4 overs)		Fiaz Ahmed 39 (26); Iqbal Hussain 3/23 (3 overs)

Qatar won by 48 runs
Oman Cricket Academy Ground Turf 2, Muscat
Umpires: Osama Saad Alnadwi (Sau) and Zahid Usman (Kuw)
Player of the match: Faisal Javed (Qat)

- Bahrain won the toss and elected to field.
- Zeeshan Abbas (Bhr) made his T20I debut.

== Final ==
24 January 2019
19:00
Scorecard

Qatar; 157/6 (20 overs)	v	Saudi Arabia; 163/2 (15.3 overs)
Tamoor Sajjad 68 (38); Muhammad Nadeem 2/33 (2 overs)		Shamsudheen Purat 88* (48); Awais Malik 1/31 (2 overs)

Saudi Arabia won by 8 wickets
Oman Cricket Academy Ground Turf 1, Muscat
Umpires: Rahul Asher (Oma) and Zahid Usman (Kuw)
Player of the match: Shamsudheen Purat (Sau)

- Saudi Arabia won the toss and elected to field.
