= Waseeq Ahmed =

Bahraini cricketer

Personal information
- Full name: Waseeq Ahmed
- Born: 3 November 1986 (age 40)
- Batting: Left-handed
- Bowling: Slow left-arm orthodox bowling
- Role: Bowler

International information
- National side: Bahrain (2021-present)
- T20I debut (cap 21): 22 October 2021 v Qatar
- Last T20I: 23 December 2022 v Malaysia

Career statistics
Competition	T20I	T20
Matches	8	8
Runs scored	1	1
Batting average	–	–
100s/50s	0/0	0/0
Top score	1*	1*
Balls bowled	144	144
Wickets	7	7
Bowling average	22.71	22.71
5 wickets in innings	–	–
10 wickets in match	–	–
Best bowling	3/14	3/14
Catches/stumpings	2/-	2/–
- Source: ESPNCricinfo, 25 December 2022

Waseeq Ahmed (born 3 November 1986) is a cricketer who currently plays for the Bahrain national cricket team.

== Career ==
Ahmed was first selected for the Bahrain national team during the 2021 ICC Men's T20 World Cup Asia Qualifier, and made his international debut on 22 October 2021, against Qatar. Known for his bowling ability, Ahmed played 2 games in the tournament, claiming 4 wickets.

After the tournament, Ahmed was then selected to play in the 2022 ICC Men's T20 World Cup Global Qualifier A. Ahmed played in all 5 games during the tournament, taking 3 wickets.
