= Harmandeep Singh =

Harmandeep Singh, also named Harry Khara, is an equestrian from India. He is a keen rider having an experience of almost ten years in this field.

== Biography ==
Singh was schooled at Delhi and Calcutta. He has played many championships all over India and has represented India abroad in other countries also. He has been an All India National champion several times and also was declared as the state champion (showjumping) in 2013 during the State games by the Bengal Olympic association. Being a successful rider, he has been able to carry the days in several championships nationwide. He is further nominated as a member of Indian Team. He is the youngest Indian to win the international. (record).

Singh excelled in Showjumping, Dressage and Tent pegging in addition to winning medals in championships and horse shows. After riding thoroughbreds and being coached by an international rider, he is now targeting the Asian Games.

He is sponsored by the leading Indian and international companies such as Indian oil, Equestrian Clearance etc. (EFI & GOVT. Of Punjab/central)
