= Jaffery Sports Club Ground =

Cricket ground in Nairobi, Kenya

Coordinates: 1.276218°S 36.768901°E

Ground information
- Location: Nairobi, Kenya
- Country: [[|]]}
- Capacity: 2,000
- End names
- Thika Road End; Mathare Valley End

International information
- First ODI: 29 January 2007: Kenya v Bermuda
- Last ODI: 5 February 2007: Kenya v Canada

Team information
Kenya	(1986 – present)
- As of 9 May 2008; Source: ESPNcricinfo

The Jaffery Sports Club Ground is a cricket ground situated in Nairobi, Kenya. It hosted its first ODI international during the 2007 World Cricket League in Kenya.

The Ground is owned by a sect of the Muslim community in Nairobi. Hence most of the players in the Club team are Islamic. This club plays host to the matches of the Nairobi Jaffery Sports Club from the Nairobi Provincial Cricket Association. Many of the young players from the cricket team have gone on to represent Kenya at various levels including Kenya, Kenya 'A', and at junior levels. A few players from this club have also gone on to represent different teams at the Sahara Elite League. A few of these players include Charles Obuya (Eastern Aces), and Ashwin Prabhakar (Southern Stars, Kenya 'A').

== List of Centuries ==
=== One Day Internationals ===
No.	Score	Player	Team	Balls	Inns.	Opposing team	Date	Result
1	112*	William Porterfield	Ireland	142	2	Bermuda	31 January 2007	Won
2	115	Eoin Morgan	Ireland	106	1	Canada	4 February 2007	Lost
3	122	Ashish Bagai	Canada	132	2	Ireland	4 February 2007	Won

== List of Five Wicket Hauls ==
=== One Day Internationals ===
No.	Bowler	Date	Team	Opposing team	Inn	Overs	Runs	Wkts	Econ	Batsmen	Result
11	Peter Ongondo	5 February 2007	Kenya	Canada	2	7	51	5	7.28	Ashish Bagai; John Davison; Sunil Dhaniram; Anderson Cummins; Austin Codrington	Won
