= Inam-ul-Haq (cricketer) =

Pakistani cricketer (born 1979)

Personal information
- Born: 7 January 1979 (age 47); Sialkot, Pakistan
- Batting: Right-handed
- Bowling: Right-arm Offbreak
- Role: Batsman

International information
- National side: Qatar (2017-2019)
- T20I debut (cap 3): 21 January 2019 v Saudi Arabia
- Last T20I: 26 July 2019 v Kuwait
- Source: Cricinfo, 26 July 2019

Inam-ul-Haq (born 7 January 1979) is a Pakistani-born cricketer who plays for the Qatar national cricket team. He played first-class cricket for several domestic teams in Pakistan between 1997 and 2012. He was also a part of Pakistan's squad for the 1998 Under-19 Cricket World Cup. In 2017, he captained Qatar in the 2017 ICC World Cricket League Division Five tournament.

He made his Twenty20 International (T20I) debut for Qatar against Saudi Arabia on 21 January 2019 in the 2019 ACC Western Region T20 tournament.
