= Syed Tameem =

Qatari cricketer

Personal information
- Born: Al Ain, United Arab Emirates
- Role: Bowler

International information
- National side: Qatar
- Only T20I: 12 December 2022 v Singapore
- Source: Cricinfo, 25 December 2022

Syed Tameem is a cricketer who plays for the Qatar national cricket team. In September 2019, he was named in Qatar's squad for the 2019 Malaysia Cricket World Cup Challenge League A tournament.
