= Imran Ashraf (cricketer) =

Qatari cricketer (born 1980)

Personal information
- Born: 18 October 1980 (age 46)

International information
- National side: Qatar
- T20I debut (cap 15): 9 October 2019 v Jersey
- Last T20I: 12 February 2020 v Uganda
- Source: Cricinfo, 13 February 2020

Imran Ashraf (born 18 October 1980) is a cricketer who plays for the Qatar national cricket team. He was named in Qatar's squad for the 2017 ICC World Cricket League Division Five tournament in South Africa. He played in Qatar's opening fixture, against the Cayman Islands, on 3 September 2017.

In October 2019, he was named in Qatar's Twenty20 International (T20I) squad for their series against Jersey. He made his T20I debut for Qatar, against Jersey, on 9 October 2019.
