= Buddhi Pradhan =

Nepalese cricket umpire

BB Pradhan
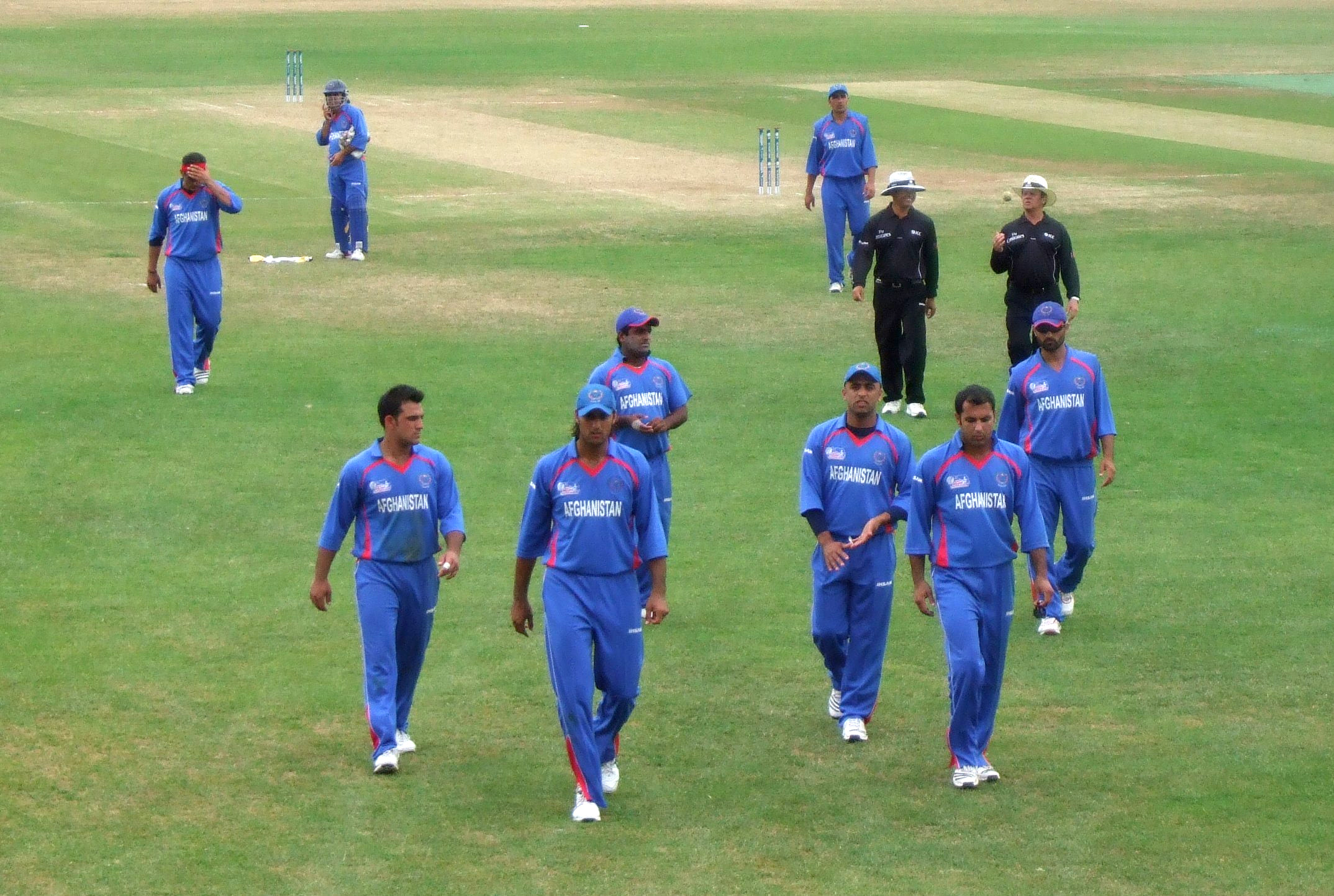
- Pradhan, the umpire in black on the left, in a match between Afghanistan and Ireland in the 2010 WCL Division One

Personal information
- Full name: Buddhi Bahadur Pradhan
- Born: 15 December 1975 (age 50); Biratnagar, Nepal
- Role: Umpire

Umpiring information
- ODIs umpired: 48 (2006–2024)
- T20Is umpired: 76 (2012–2025)
- WODIs umpired: 8 (2011–2013)
- WT20Is umpired: 29 (2012–2026)
- Source: ESPNcricinfo, 7 November 2023

Buddhi Bahadhur Pradhan (Nepali: बुद्धि प्रधान) is an international cricket umpire from Nepal. He was one of the seventeen on-field umpires for the 2018 Under-19 Cricket World Cup. He has also officiated as an on-field umpire in the 2022 Under-19 Cricket World Cup.

== See also ==
- List of One Day International cricket umpires
- List of Twenty20 International cricket umpires
