= Qalandar Khan =

Qatari cricketer (born 1985)

Personal information
- Born: 12 October 1985 (age 41)

International information
- National side: Qatar
- T20I debut (cap 13): 4 July 2019 v Kuwait
- Last T20I: 11 October 2019 v Jersey
- Source: Cricinfo, 11 October 2019

Qalandar Khan (born 12 October 1985) is a cricketer who plays for the Qatar national cricket team. He was named in Qatar's squad for the 2017 ICC World Cricket League Division Five tournament in South Africa. His first fixture of the tournament was against Guernsey, on 6 September 2017. He made his Twenty20 International (T20I) debut for Qatar against Kuwait on 4 July 2019.

In September 2019, he was named in Qatar's squad for the 2019 Malaysia Cricket World Cup Challenge League A tournament. He made his List A debut for Qatar, against Singapore, in the Cricket World Cup Challenge League A tournament on 17 September 2019.
