= Deusdedit Muhumuza =

Ugandan cricketer

Personal information
- Full name: Deusdedit Muhumuza
- Born: 30 September 1989 (age 37); Kakira, Uganda
- Batting: Right-handed
- Bowling: Right-arm medium

International information
- National side: Uganda
- T20I debut (cap 4): 20 May 2019 v Botswana
- Last T20I: 22 September 2022 v Tanzania
- Source: Cricinfo, 22 September 2022

Deusdedit Muhumuza (born 30 September 1989) is a Ugandan cricketer. In July 2022, Muhumuza was named as the captain of the Uganda cricket team.

== Career ==
Muhumuza played for Uganda in the 2014 Cricket World Cup Qualifier tournament. In April 2018, he was named in Uganda's squad for the 2018 ICC World Cricket League Division Four tournament in Malaysia.

In July 2018, he was part of Uganda's squad in the Eastern sub region group for the 2018–19 ICC World Twenty20 Africa Qualifier tournament. In September 2018, he was named in Uganda's squad for the 2018 Africa T20 Cup. The following month, he was named in Uganda's squad for the 2018 ICC World Cricket League Division Three tournament in Oman.

In May 2019, he was named in Uganda's squad for the Regional Finals of the 2018–19 ICC T20 World Cup Africa Qualifier tournament in Uganda. He made his Twenty20 International (T20I) debut against Botswana on 20 May 2019. On 15 February 2020, in the third and final match against Qatar, Muhumuza became the first bowler for Uganda to take a five-wicket haul in T20I cricket.

In November 2021, he was named as the vice-captain of Uganda's squad for the Regional Final of the 2021 ICC Men's T20 World Cup Africa Qualifier tournament in Rwanda. In May 2022, he was named in Uganda's side for the 2022 Uganda Cricket World Cup Challenge League B tournament.
