= Shivani Mishra =

Cricket umpire

Personal information
- Born: 14 January 1973 (age 53); Lucknow, Uttar Pradesh, India
- Role: Umpire

Umpiring information
- T20Is umpired: 24 (2019–2024)
- WT20Is umpired: 34 (2022–2026)
- Source: ESPNcricinfo, 18 February 2024

Shivani Mishra (born 14 January 1973) is an Indian-born international cricket umpire and match referee who is currently based in Qatar, working with the Qatar Cricket Association (QCA). She is an ACC-affiliated Level 3 Coach, Level 3 Umpire and ICC-affiliated Match Referee. Additionally, she is an ICC Asia Coach & Umpire Educator. Mishra has officiated cricket matches as an umpire in Qatari local matches such as Men's Division Matches, and also International matches such as the ICC Men's T20 Qualifier conducted in Kuwait.

On 20 January 2019, Mishra became the first female on-field umpire to officiate in a men's T20I.

She was the first Asian woman to participate in the ICC Development Panel for umpires. She coached Qatar Women's Cricket Team and imparted cricket education in various courses run by QCA.

In May 2019, the International Cricket Council named her one of the eight women on the ICC Development Panel of Umpires.

== See also ==
- List of Twenty20 International cricket umpires
