= Tamoor Sajjad =

Qatari cricketer

Personal information
- Full name: Tamoor Sajjad Zafar
- Born: 22 January 1992 (age 34); Sialkot, Pakistan
- Role: Batsman

International information
- National side: Qatar (2017-2020)
- T20I debut (cap 10): 21 January 2019 v Saudi Arabia
- Last T20I: 26 February 2020 v UAE
- Source: Cricinfo, 26 February 2020

Tamoor Sajjad (born 22 January 1992) is a Pakistani-born cricketer who plays for the Qatar national cricket team. He was a member of Qatar's squad for the 2017 ICC World Cricket League Division Five tournament in South Africa. He played in Qatar's opening fixture, against the Cayman Islands, on 3 September 2017. He scored the most runs for Qatar in the tournament, with a total of 236 runs in five matches.

He made his Twenty20 International (T20I) debut for Qatar against Saudi Arabia on 21 January 2019 in the 2019 ACC Western Region T20 tournament. He was the leading wicket-taker in the competition, with ten dismissals in five matches, and was named the player of the tournament.

In July 2019, he was named as the captain of Qatar's squad for the Regional Finals of the 2018–19 ICC T20 World Cup Asia Qualifier tournament. He finished the tournament as the leading run-scorer for Qatar, with 115 runs in four matches.

In September 2019, he was named in Qatar's squad for the 2019 Malaysia Cricket World Cup Challenge League A tournament.
