= Awais Malik =

Qatari cricketer (born 1982)

Personal information
- Full name: Mohammed Awais Malik
- Born: 11 October 1982 (age 44)
- Batting: Right-handed
- Role: All-rounder

International information
- National side: Qatar (2019-2020)
- T20I debut (cap 1): 21 January 2019 v Saudi Arabia
- Last T20I: 26 February 2020 v UAE
- Source: Cricinfo, 26 February 2020

Awais Malik (born 11 October 1982) is a cricketer who plays for the Qatar national cricket team. He was named in Qatar's squad for the 2017 ICC World Cricket League Division Five tournament in South Africa. He played in Qatar's opening fixture, against the Cayman Islands, on 3 September 2017.

He made his Twenty20 International (T20I) debut against Saudi Arabia on 21 January 2019 in the 2019 ACC Western Region T20 tournament. In September 2019, he was named in Qatar's squad for the 2019 Malaysia Cricket World Cup Challenge League A tournament. He made his List A debut for Qatar, against Singapore, in the Cricket World Cup Challenge League A tournament on 17 September 2019.
