= Zaheer Ibrahim =

Qatari cricketer (born 1988)

Personal information
- Born: 2 April 1988 (age 38); Mangalore, India
- Role: All Rounder

International information
- National side: Qatar (2019-present)
- T20I debut (cap 11): 21 January 2019 v Saudi Arabia
- Last T20I: 29 October 2021 v Kuwait
- Source: ESPNCricinfo, 25 December 2022

Zaheer Ibrahim (born 2 April 1988) is a cricketer who plays for the Qatar national cricket team. He was named in Qatar's squad for the 2017 ICC World Cricket League Division Five tournament in South Africa. He played in Qatar's opening fixture, against the Cayman Islands, on 3 September 2017.

He made his Twenty20 International (T20I) debut for Qatar against Saudi Arabia on 21 January 2019 in the 2019 ACC Western Region T20 tournament. In September 2019, he was named in Qatar's squad for the 2019 Malaysia Cricket World Cup Challenge League A tournament. He made his List A debut for Qatar, against Singapore, in the Cricket World Cup Challenge League A tournament on 17 September 2019. In October 2021, he was named in Qatar's squad for the Group A matches in the 2021 ICC Men's T20 World Cup Asia Qualifier. He was selected for Malaysia Quadrangular Series, which was played in December 2022, but he didn't play in any match.
