= List of Bahrain Twenty20 International cricketers =

This is a list of Bahraini Twenty20 International cricketers.

In April 2018, the ICC decided to grant full Twenty20 International (T20I) status to all its members. Therefore, all Twenty20 matches played between Bahrain and other ICC members after 1 January 2019 have the full T20I status.

This list comprises all members of the Bahrain cricket team who have played at least one T20I match. It is initially arranged in the order in which each player won his first Twenty20 cap. Where more than one player won their first Twenty20 cap in the same match, their surnames are listed alphabetically.

== Key ==
General

- ‡ – Captain
- † – Wicket-keeper
- First – Year of debut
- Last – Year of latest game
- Mat – Number of matches played

Batting

- Runs – Runs scored in career
- HS – Highest score
- 50 – Half-centuries scored
- 100 – Centuries scored
- Avg – Runs scored per dismissal
- * – Batsman remained not out

Bowling

- Balls – Balls bowled in career
- Wkt – Wickets taken in career
- BBI – Best bowling in an innings
- Ave – Average runs per wicket

Fielding

- Ca – Catches taken
- St – Stumpings affected

== List of players ==
Statistics are correct as of 14 October 2026.

Bahrain T20I cricketers
General					Batting					Bowling				Fielding		Ref
No.	Name	First	Last	Mat	Runs	HS	Avg	50	100	Balls	Wkt	BBI	Ave	Ca	St	Ref
1	Adil Hanif‡	2019	2019	4	24	16	12.00	0	0	–	–	–	–	0	0	
2	Ammad Uddin	2019	2021	12	187	41*	23.37	0	0	7	0	–	–	0	0	
3	Anasim Khan‡	2019	2021	12	87	23*	12.42	0	0	228	7	3/15	42.85	3	0	
4	Babar Ali	2019	2019	3	1	1*	–	0	0	54	5	2/18	14.00	3	0	
5	Fiaz Ahmed	2019	2026	80	1,905	105*	33.42	10	1	–	–	–	–	28	0	
6	Imran Anwar	2019	2026	112	1,287	87	19.20	7	0	1,877	97	4/24	23.72	26	0	
7	Imran Ali†	2019	2024	27	529	62	22.04	4	0	–	–	–	–	10	6	
8	Qasim Zia	2019	2019	3	4	4*	–	0	0	54	1	1/17	68.00	0	0	
9	Sarfaraz Ali‡	2019	2024	52	1,050	69*	21.42	6	0	817	38	4/12	25.81	7	0	
10	Shahbaz Badar†	2019	2024	16	161	44	10.73	0	0	–	–	–	–	8	3	
11	Tahir Dar	2019	2019	4	25	15	12.50	0	0	84	3	2/31	42.66	2	0	
12	Muhammad Rafique	2019	2019	2	4	4	4.00	0	0	30	2	1/31	31.50	0	0	
13	Zeeshan Abbas	2019	2022	4	1	1	1.00	0	0	54	1	1/30	65.00	1	0	
14	Abdul Majid Malik	2020	2024	9	15	12	15.00	0	0	168	10	4/23	15.80	0	0	
15	Imran Butt	2020	2020	4	30	17	10.00	0	0	72	5	2/24	20.80	1	0	
16	Junaid Aziz	2020	2026	89	926	52	22.58	1	0	206	17	5/5	18.76	29	0	
17	Sathaiya Veerapathiran	2020	2024	43	302	33*	13.13	0	0	777	47	3/20	21.97	23	0	
18	Muhammad Younis	2020	2022	14	262	82*	20.15	1	0	6	0	–	–	3	0	
19	Mohammed Sameer	2020	2026	5	91	43	18.20	0	0	–	–	–	–	2	0	
20	Haider Ali‡	2021	2024	63	1,408	79*	31.28	8	0	150	12	3/7	17.33	31	0	
21	Waseeq Ahmed	2021	2022	16	3	1*	–	0	0	296	15	3/14	22.13	3	0	
22	Prashant Kurup†	2021	2026	75	1,721	74	25.68	7	0	16	2	2/10	5.00	42	8	
23	David Mathias	2022	2022	16	394	61	32.83	2	0	84	2	2/17	57.50	1	0	
24	Muhammad Safdar†	2022	2022	3	16	8*	–	0	0	–	–	–	–	4	1	
25	Shahid Mahmood	2022	2022	13	21	17	21.00	0	0	264	10	2/30	38.50	6	0	
26	Umer Toor‡†	2022	2024	33	501	72	15.65	2	0	–	–	–	–	15	4	
27	Sikander Billah	2022	2022	7	75	33	18.75	0	0	46	2	1/9	26.00	0	0	
28	George Axtell	2022	2022	2	0	0*	–	0	0	42	1	1/17	42.00	3	0	
29	Janaka Chaturanga	2022	2022	4	42	20	10.50	0	0	–	–	–	–	1	0	
30	Sachin Kumar	2022	2024	13	26	19*	8.66	0	0	180	10	4/40	26.50	2	0	
31	Naveen Thailappan	2022	2022	2	–	–	–	–	–	42	1	1/42	82.00	0	0	
32	Imran Khan	2022	2026	61	15	3*	1.50	0	0	1,111	61	4/16	21.80	18	0	
33	Ahmer Bin Nasir†	2022	2026	104	1,573	68*	27.59	7	0	36	2	1/6	29.00	40	2	
34	Rizwan Butt	2022	2026	97	274	34*	8.83	0	0	2,087	148	6/9	15.86	19	0	
35	Sohail Ahmed	2022	2026	81	1,983	80*	42.19	16	0	116	4	3/17	38.75	26	0	
36	Danish Jasnaik	2022	2022	19	22	11	4.75	0	0	90	3	2/17	44.33	1	0	
37	Yousif Wali	2022	2026	5	16	14	5.33	0	0	60	1	1/28	97.00	0	0	
38	Abdul Majid Abbasi	2023	2026	88	48	8*	5.33	0	0	1,829	82	5/25	20.35	21	0	
39	Ali Dawood	2023	2026	85	100	19	8.33	0	0	1,834	135	7/19	13.63	30	0	
40	Yaseer Nazeer	2023	2026	14	206	46	17.16	0	0	6	0	–	–	0	0	
41	Mohsin Zaki	2023	2023	5	5	4*	–	0	0	60	3	1/8	26.33	0	0	
42	Ubaid Martuza	2024	2025	8	24	12*	24.00	0	0	–	–	–	–	1	0	
43	Asif Ali	2024	2026	65	1,501	100*	26.80	8	1	555	28	3/24	21.71	18	0	
44	Muhammad Salman	2024	2026	18	7	6	3.50	0	0	360	17	3/25	22.47	6	0	
45	Sai Sarthak	2024	2025	9	44	26	14.66	0	0	112	11	4/23	11.18	2	0	
46	Muhammed Basil	2024	2025	5	6	5	2.00	0	0	–	–	–	–	0	0	
47	Asif Shaikh	2025	2026	21	11	9	5.50	0	0	398	22	3/20	18.00	4	0	
48	Shashank Shukla	2025	2025	7	6	3*	6.00	0	0	114	7	3/19	13.85	0	0	
49	Abdullah Mohd Yousaf	2025	2026	5	28	12	14.00	0	0	63	2	1/3	47.50	3	0	
50	Naveena Shetty	2025	2025	12	61	20	8.71	0	0	12	0	–	–	1	0	
51	Asif Javed	2025	2026	12	32	14	8.00	0	0	210	14	3/5	13.92	6	0	
52	Shujaat Rasool	2026	2026	13	134	54	22.33	0	0	147	10	3/33	15.00	5	0	
53	Abdulla Pervaiz	2026	2026	3	107	40	35.66	0	0	–	–	–	–	0	0	
54	Abdulla Pervaiz	2026	2026	2	16	14*	16.00	0	0	36	1	1/33	74.00	0	0	
55	Mohammad Hamza	2026	2026	3	–	–	–	–	0	–	–	–	–	1	0	
56	Muhammad Adil	2026	2026	3	65	45	32.50	0	0	42	3	2/20	20.33	2	0	
57	Numan Yousuf	2026	2026	2	42	42	21.00	0	0	–	–	–	–	0	0	
58	Sameer Yousuf	2026	2026	3	17	13*	17.00	0	0	60	2	1/30	45.50	0	0	
59	Abdul Rauf	2026	2026	1	0	0	0.00	0	0	18	0	–	–	0	0	
60	Hamza Riaz	2026	2026	1	0	0	0.00	0	0	–	–	–	–	0	0	
61	Mohamad Junaid Khushi	2026	2026	1	1	1*	–	0	0	18	1	1/51	51.00	0	0	
62	Mohamad Wasim	2026	2026	1	–	–	–	–	–	–	–	–	–	0	0	
