= Nouman Sarwar =

Qatari cricketer (born 1984)

Personal information
- Born: 2 August 1984 (age 42)

International information
- National side: Qatar (2017-2019)
- T20I debut (cap 9): 21 January 2019 v Saudi Arabia
- Last T20I: 11 October 2019 v Jersey
- Source: ESPNCricinfo, 11 October 2019

Nouman Sarwar (born 2 August 1984) is a cricketer who plays for the Qatar national cricket team. He made his Twenty20 International (T20I) debut for Qatar against Saudi Arabia on 21 January 2019 in the 2019 ACC Western Region T20 tournament.
