= Iqbal Hussain (cricketer) =

Qatari cricketer (born 1989)

Personal information
- Full name: Iqbal Hussain Chaudhry
- Born: 14 January 1989 (age 37); Dhaka, Bangladesh
- Role: Batsman

International information
- National side: Qatar (2019-2021)
- T20I debut (cap 4): 21 January 2019 v Saudi Arabia
- Last T20I: 29 October 2021 v Kuwait
- Source: Cricinfo, 29 October 2021

Iqbal Hussain (born 14 January 1989) is a cricketer who plays for the Qatar national cricket team and the former captain of the national team.

== Career ==
He was named in Qatar's squad for the 2017 ICC World Cricket League Division Five tournament in South Africa. He played in Qatar's opening fixture, against the Cayman Islands, on 3 September 2017.

He made his Twenty20 International (T20I) debut for Qatar against Saudi Arabia on 21 January 2019 in the 2019 ACC Western Region T20 tournament. He was the leading wicket-taker in the Regional Finals of the 2018–19 ICC T20 World Cup Asia Qualifier tournament, with twelve dismissals in four matches.

In September 2019, he was named as the captain of Qatar's team for the 2019 Malaysia Cricket World Cup Challenge League A tournament. He made his List A debut for Qatar, against Singapore, in the Cricket World Cup Challenge League A tournament on 17 September 2019. In October 2021, he was named as the captain of Qatar's squad for the Group A matches in the 2021 ICC Men's T20 World Cup Asia Qualifier.
