= Kamran Khan (Qatari cricketer) =

Qatari cricketer (born 1988)

Personal information
- Born: 29 September 1988 (age 38); Swat District, Khyber Pakhtunkhwa, Pakistan
- Role: Batsman

International information
- National side: Qatar (2019-present)
- T20I debut (cap 5): 21 January 2019 v Saudi Arabia
- Last T20I: 23 December 2022 v Singapore
- Source: Cricinfo, 25 December 2022

Kamran Khan (born 29 September 1988) is a Pakistani-born cricketer who plays for the Qatar national cricket team. He was named in Qatar's squad for the 2017 ICC World Cricket League Division Five tournament in South Africa. He played in Qatar's opening fixture, against the Cayman Islands, on 3 September 2017.

He made his Twenty20 International (T20I) debut for Qatar against Saudi Arabia on 21 January 2019 in the 2019 ACC Western Region T20 tournament. In September 2019, he was named in Qatar's squad for the 2019 Malaysia Cricket World Cup Challenge League A tournament. He made his List A debut for Qatar, against Singapore, in the Cricket World Cup Challenge League A tournament on 17 September 2019. In October 2021, he was named in Qatar's squad for the Group A matches in the 2021 ICC Men's T20 World Cup Asia Qualifier.
