= Faisal Javed (cricketer) =

Pakistani-born Qatari cricketer (born 1975)

Personal information
- Born: 20 February 1975 (age 51); Lahore, Pakistan
- Role: Batsman

International information
- National side: Qatar (2017-2019)
- T20I debut (cap 2): 21 January 2019 v Saudi Arabia
- Last T20I: 11 October 2019 v Jersey
- Source: Cricinfo, 11 October 2019

Faisal Javed (born 20 February 1975) is a Pakistani-born cricketer who plays for the Qatar national cricket team. He was named in Qatar's squad for the 2017 ICC World Cricket League Division Five tournament in South Africa. He played in Qatar's opening fixture, against the Cayman Islands, on 3 September 2017.

He made his Twenty20 International (T20I) debut for Qatar against Saudi Arabia on 21 January 2019 in the 2019 ACC Western Region T20 tournament.
