= West End Park International Cricket Stadium =

Cricket ground in Doha, Qatar

Coordinates: 25°11′21″N 51°27′36″E

- Interactive map of West End Park International Cricket Stadium

Ground information
- Location: Doha, Qatar
- Country: Qatar
- Establishment: 2013; 13 years ago
- Capacity: 14,500
- End names
- Salwa Road End; West End

International information
- First men's ODI: 21 January 2022: Afghanistan v Netherlands
- Last men's ODI: 25 January 2022: Afghanistan v Netherlands
- First men's T20I: 4 July 2019: Qatar v Kuwait
- Last men's T20I: 15 February 2026: Qatar v Bahrain
- First women's ODI: 10 January 2014: Ireland v Pakistan
- Last women's ODI: 17 January 2014: Pakistan v South Africa
- First women's T20I: 19 January 2014: Pakistan v South Africa
- Last women's T20I: 14 February 2026: Qatar v Oman

Team information
Qatar	(2019–present)
Afghanistan	(2022–present)
- As of 15 February 2026; Source: Cricinfo

West End Park International Cricket Stadium (official name) or Al-Arabi Stadium or Asian Town Cricket Stadium is a cricket ground in Doha, Qatar. In June 2013, the ground was opened for cricket with the opening of the Grand Mall Hypermarket on its premise. The stadium can seat 13,000 spectators.

== History ==
West End Park is developed by the Qatar Property Management in collaboration with Sheikh Jassim bin Mohammad bin Thani Social Welfare Foundation. The sports club at West End Park project will also have a football ground, four cricket pitches for practice, four badminton and eight basketball courts.

The project comprises four cinemas, an open-air Amphitheatre with capacity 14,500 seats, children's theme park, restaurants and recreational facilities.

In December 2013, it was announced the hosting of first-ever triangular women's One-day and Twenty20 championship in Qatar in January 2014. Women's international teams from the Pakistan, South Africa and Ireland participated in the seven championship matches. This was the first championship ever to be sanctioned by the International Cricket Council.

In October 2014, it hosted Eid T20 Challenge which was between Asia XI and World XI. Several famous players like Brian Lara, Herschelle Gibbs, Sanath Jayasuriya and Tamim Iqbal took part in the match.

In 2015, the stadium was selected to host 1st edition of Pakistan Super League matches which will be played in February 2016. But it was then declared by PCB that the matches will be played in Dubai and Sharjah thus The stadium could not host its first big tournament yet.

The stadium was selected to host all of the Qatar T10 League matches from 7–16 December 2019.

In January 2022, Afghanistan used this venue as their home ground for a 3-match ODI series against Netherlands. The series was a part of 2020–2023 Cricket World Cup Super League.

It has been announced it will be the home ground for Afghanistan test cricket in the future.

== Records ==
=== International centuries ===
==== ODI centuries ====
1 ODI century have been scored at the venue.

No.	Score	Player	Team	Balls	Opposing team	Date	Result
1	103	Rahmanullah Gurbaz	Afghanistan	127	Netherlands	23 January 2022	Won

=== List of International five-wicket hauls ===
==== Twenty-20 Internationals ====
The following table summarizes the five-wicket hauls taken in T20Is at this venue.

#	Figures	Player	Country	Innings	Opponent	Date	Result
1	5/13	Deusdedit Muhumuza	Uganda	2	Qatar	15 February 2020	Won
