= Mohammed Rizlan =

Qatari cricketer

Personal information
- Full name: Mohammed Rizlan Iqbar
- Born: 27 July 1985 (age 41); Kandy, Sri Lanka
- Role: Batsman

International information
- National side: Qatar (2019-present)
- T20I debut (cap 6): 21 January 2019 v Saudi Arabia
- Last T20I: 23 December 2022 v Singapore
- Source: Cricinfo, 25 December 2022

Mohammed Rizlan (born 27 July 1985) is a Sri Lankan-born cricketer who plays for the Qatar national cricket team and captains the national team.

== Career ==
He was named in Qatar's squad for the 2017 ICC World Cricket League Division Five tournament in South Africa. He played in Qatar's opening fixture, against the Cayman Islands, on 3 September 2017.

He made his Twenty20 International (T20I) debut for Qatar against Saudi Arabia on 21 January 2019 in the 2019 ACC Western Region T20 tournament. In the third and final fixture of the series, Rizlan was named the man of the match after he scored a six to win the match, with Qatar winning the series 2–1.

In September 2019, he was named as the vice-captain of Qatar's team for the 2019 Malaysia Cricket World Cup Challenge League A tournament. He made his List A debut for Qatar, against Singapore, in the Cricket World Cup Challenge League A tournament on 17 September 2019. He finished the tournament as the leading run-scorer for Qatar, with 209 runs in five matches. In October 2021, he was named as the vice-captain of Qatar's squad for the Group A matches in the 2021 ICC Men's T20 World Cup Asia Qualifier.

In June 2022, he was named as the new captain of the national team, ahead of the 2022 Canada Cricket World Cup Challenge League A tournament.
