= List of Qatar Twenty20 International cricketers =

This is a list of Qatari Twenty20 International cricketers.

In April 2018, the ICC decided to grant full Twenty20 International (T20I) status to all its members. Therefore, all Twenty20 matches played between Qatar and other ICC members after 1 January 2019 will be eligible for T20I status.

This list comprises all members of the Qatar cricket team who have played at least one T20I match. It is initially arranged in the order in which each player won his first Twenty20 cap. Where more than one player won his first Twenty20 cap in the same match, those players are listed alphabetically by surname.

== Key ==
General

- ‡ – Captain
- † – Wicket-keeper
- First – Year of debut
- Last – Year of latest game
- Mat – Number of matches played

Batting

- Runs – Runs scored in career
- HS – Highest score
- 50 – Half-centuries scored
- Avg – Runs scored per dismissal
- * – Batsman remained not out

Bowling

- Balls – Balls bowled in career
- Wkt – Wickets taken in career
- BBI – Best bowling in an innings
- Ave – Average runs per wicket

Fielding

- Ca – Catches taken
- St – Stumpings affected

== List of players ==
Statistics are correct as of 14 October 2026.

Qatar T20I cricketers
General					Batting				Bowling				Fielding		Ref
No.	Name	First	Last	Mat	Runs	HS	Avg	50	Balls	Wkt	BBI	Ave	Ca	St	Ref
1	Awais Malik	2019	2020	18	17	9	2.42	0	342	22	3/19	20.27	4	0	
2	Faisal Javed	2019	2019	15	330	61	22.00	2	–	–	–	–	5	0	
3	Inam-ul-Haq‡	2019	2019	11	225	73*	25.00	1	186	8	2/23	26.37	3	0	
4	Iqbal Hussain‡	2019	2021	26	65	22*	10.83	0	564	45	4/16	15.40	14	0	
5	Kamran Khan	2019	2025	39	864	88	24.68	5	35	0	–	–	11	0	
6	Mohammed Rizlan‡†	2019	2024	44	598	72*	20.62	3	–	–	–	–	21	10	
7	Mohammed Nadeem	2019	2024	43	10	4*	3.33	0	918	44	4/10	22.86	12	0	
8	Muhammad Tanveer‡	2019	2025	72	1,980	88*	39.60	15	333	11	2/31	40.18	19	0	
9	Nouman Sarwar	2019	2024	16	176	47*	58.66	0	233	18	4/14	16.38	8	0	
10	Tamoor Sajjad‡	2019	2020	16	380	68	34.54	1	349	18	3/11	22.11	13	0	
11	Zaheer Ibrahim	2019	2021	24	317	50	18.64	1	7	0	–	–	11	0	
12	Gayan Munaweera	2019	2024	29	69	22	17.25	0	558	29	2/18	25.51	6	0	
13	Qalandar Khan	2019	2019	4	48	25	16.00	0	–	–	–	–	0	0	
14	Musawar Shah	2019	2024	14	1	1*	–	0	270	16	3/18	18.93	3	0	
15	Imran Ashraf	2019	2020	4	–	–	–	–	66	2	2/23	56.50	1	0	
16	Saqlain Arshad	2019	2026	44	846	76	20.63	4	150	10	2/14	18.50	9	0	
17	Khurram Shahzad	2020	2020	7	17	10	4.25	0	6	0	–	–	1	0	
18	Imal Liyanage†	2020	2026	62	1,413	86	26.66	9	–	–	–	–	30	7	
19	Andri Berenger	2021	2021	4	74	37	18.50	0	–	–	–	–	2	0	
20	Muhammad Murad‡	2021	2025	18	75	14*	12.50	0	329	16	3/17	26.62	6	0	
21	Akash Babu	2022	2022	7	2	2	0.66	0	6	0	–	–	1	0	
22	Assad Borham	2022	2022	7	11	8*	5.50	0	6	0	–	–	2	0	
23	Dharmang Patel	2022	2022	5	17	17	17.00	0	–	–	–	–	2	0	
24	Ikramullah Khan‡	2022	2026	47	394	55	17.13	3	774	36	3/17	28.80	7	0	
25	Valeed Veetil	2022	2022	7	56	53	28.00	0	124	4	1/4	41.25	0	0	
26	Syed Tameem	2022	2022	1	11	11	11.00	0	–	–	–	–	1	0	
27	Yousuf Ali	2022	2023	4	4	4	4.00	0	42	1	1/16	60.00	0	0	
28	Adnan Mirza	2023	2024	14	163	30	13.58	0	240	11	3/13	26.18	5	0	
29	Mirza Mohammed Baig‡	2023	2026	39	426	60*	17.75	1	537	46	4/17	15.10	9	0	
30	Bipin Kumar	2023	2025	12	5	3	2.50	0	210	5	2/32	61.00	3	0	
31	Bukhar Illikkal	2023	2025	15	39	25	9.75	0	246	6	1/8	47.00	4	0	
32	Muhammad Jabir	2023	2025	28	6	4*	1.50	0	517	29	4/37	26.48	5	0	
33	Himanshu Rathod	2023	2024	23	207	47	29.57	0	457	36	4/29	13.52	6	0	
34	Uzair Amir	2023	2023	2	10	10	5.00	0	–	–	–	–	2	0	
35	Jassim Khan	2023	2025	12	140	31*	20.00	0	–	–	–	–	9	0	
36	Mohammed Irshad	2023	2025	15	151	25	15.10	0	159	14	4/24	17.28	7	0	
37	Mohammad Ahnaff	2023	2025	21	460	60*	28.75	3	6	0	–	–	9	0	
38	Amir Farooq	2024	2025	18	87	31	9.66	0	353	20	5/32	23.30	3	0	
39	Shahzaib Jamil†	2024	2026	30	407	44	20.35	0	–	–	–	–	16	4	
40	Rifayi Theruvath	2024	2025	6	40	15	6.66	0	–	–	–	–	0	0	
41	Premsagar Gopalkrishnan	2024	2024	1	–	–	–	–	6	1	1/5	5.00	0	0	
42	Arumugaganesh Nagarajan	2024	2025	8	69	28	13.80	0	90	3	2/19	45.33	2	0	
43	Owais Ahmed	2024	2026	24	15	10*	15.00	0	419	21	4/29	20.04	4	0	
44	Muhammad Asim	2024	2026	30	723	67*	40.16	6	473	27	4/6	17.81	13	0	
45	Mujeeb-ur-Rehman	2024	2026	29	124	28	12.40	0	498	24	3/23	21.54	7	0	
46	Mohammad Abrar	2025	2025	4	9	8*	9.00	0	–	–	–	–	2	0	
47	Arif Nasir Uddin	2025	2025	3	0	0	0.00	0	48	0	–	–	2	0	
48	Daniel Louis	2025	2026	20	86	17*	12.28	0	318	27	4/6	13.81	14	0	
49	Shakkir Kassim	2025	2025	1	7	7	7.00	0	–	–	–	–	1	0	
50	Shariq Munir	2025	2026	19	203	41	18.45	0	246	13	4/12	21.76	9	0	
51	Zubair Ali	2025	2026	20	513	86	32.06	5	–	–	–	–	9	0	
52	Mokbul Ahammed	2025	2025	2	5	5	5.00	3	24	0	–	–	1	0	
53	Shahzeb Afridi	2025	2026	7	113	45	28.25	0	12	1	1/32	32.00	2	0	
54	Zeeshan Haider	2026	2026	10	203	79	40.60	1	–	–	–	–	2	0	
55	Obaid ur Rahman	2026	2026	1	–	–	–	–	18	1	1/23	23.00	0	0	
56	Akshay Shankar	2026	2026	1	14	14	14.00	0	–	–	–	–	0	0	
