= Qatar national cricket team =

Men's sports team representing Qatar

Qatar
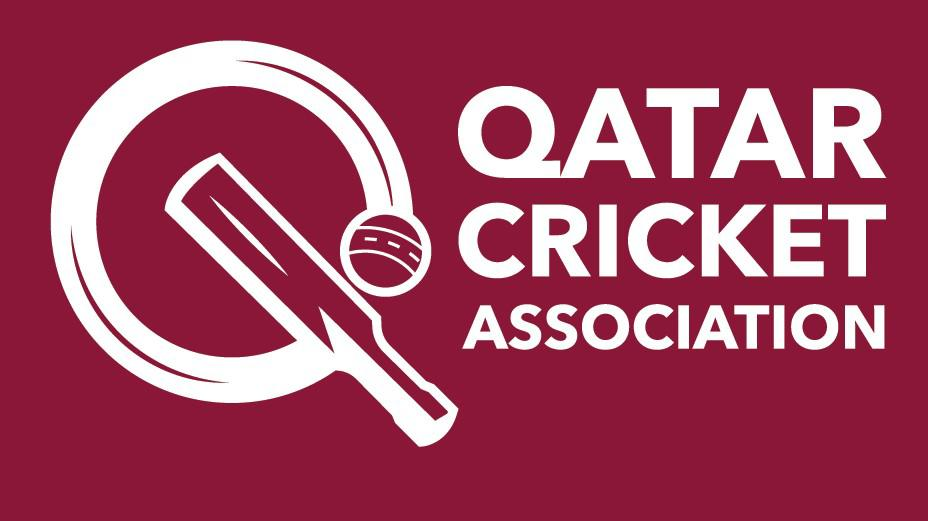
- Association: Qatar Cricket Association

Personnel
- Captain: Mohammed Rizlan
- Coach: Mohammad Haroon

International Cricket Council
- ICC status: Associate member (2017); Affiliate member (1999)
- ICC region: Asia
ICC Rankings	Current	Best-ever
T20I	28th	21st (2 May 2019)

International cricket
- First international: Qatar v Sharjah (Emirate of Sharjah) (Kuwait City; 30 October 1979)

T20 Internationals
- First T20I: v Saudi Arabia at Al Emarat Cricket Stadium, Muscat; 21 January 2019
- Last T20I: v Bahrain at Selangor Turf Club, Kuala Lumpur; 14 October 2026
T20Is	Played	Won/Lost
Total	91	48/36 (4 ties, 3 no results)
This year	11	8/2 (0 ties, 1 no result)
List A & T20I kit
- As of 14 October 2026

The Qatar national cricket team is the team that represents Qatar in international cricket. The team is organised by the Qatar Cricket Association, which became an affiliate member of the International Cricket Council (ICC) in 1999 and an associate member in 2017.

Qatar made its international debut in 1979, at an invitational tournament that also included Bahrain, Kuwait, and Sharjah (one of the United Arab Emirates). The team's first Asian Cricket Council (ACC) event was the 2002 ACC Trophy in Singapore. For a period during the 2000s, Qatar was one of the top-ranked non-Test teams in Asia – at the 2004 ACC Trophy, the team placed fourth. However, a few years later it was relegated to the second-division ACC events.

Qatar made its first and only World Cricket League (WCL) appearance at the 2017 ICC World Cricket League Division Five event in South Africa. It placed third, enough to secure the team a place in the new 2019–21 ICC Cricket World Cup Challenge League.

== History ==
=== International competition ===
Qatar's international debut came in 2002 at the ACC Trophy, where they failed to progress beyond the first round. A major improvement came in the next tournament in 2004 when they came fourth. This qualified them for the final pre-qualifying tournament for the 2005 ICC Trophy, played in Malaysia in early 2005. They finished fourth in that tournament, thereby dropping off the road to qualification to the 2007 World Cup. They once again competed at the ACC Trophy in 2006, this time finishing in eighth place. They played the ACC Elite 2008, new version of the tournament.

=== 2018–present ===
In April 2018, the ICC decided to grant full Twenty20 International (T20I) status to all its members. Therefore, all Twenty20 matches played between Qatar and other ICC members after 1 January 2019 will be a full T20I.

Qatar made its Twenty20 International debut on 21 January 2019, defeating Saudi Arabia by 4 wickets in the 2019 ACC Western Region T20 at Al Emarat Cricket Stadium, Muscat, Oman. Toby Bailey is the head coach of the Qatar men’s national cricket team, appointed in April 2025 by the Qatar Cricket Association.

A former English cricketer, he brings international coaching experience from Scotland and Argentina to develop Qatar cricket.

21 January 2019
09:30
Scorecard

Saudi Arabia; 126 (20 overs)	v	Qatar; 127/6 (15.3 overs)
Sajid Cheema 47 (41); Tamoor Sajjad 3/11 (4 overs)		Faisal Javed 43 (26); Muhammad Nadeem 3/16 (3 overs)

Qatar won by 4 wickets
Al Amerat Cricket Stadium, Muscat
Umpires: Rahul Asher (Oma) and Vinod Babu (Oma)
Player of the match: Tamoor Sajjad (Qat)

- Qatar won the toss and elected to field.
- First ever T20I match for Qatar.

== Tournament history ==
Legend

- Champions
- Runners-up
- Third place/Semi-finals
- Hosts
- Q Qualified/Advanced to next stage
- DNQ Did not qualify
- ▲ Promoted
- Remained in the same division
- ▼ Relegated

=== Cricket World Cup ===
Cricket World Cup record								Qualification record				
Year	Round	Position	Pld	W	L	T	NR	Pld	W	L	T	NR
(England) 1975	Not an ICC member							Not an ICC member				
(England) 1979	Not an ICC member							Not an ICC member				
(England) (Wales) 1983	Not an ICC member							Not an ICC member				
(India) (Pakistan) 1987	Not an ICC member							Not an ICC member				
(Australia) (New Zealand) 1992	Not an ICC member							Not an ICC member				
(India) (Pakistan) (Sri Lanka) 1996	Not an ICC member							Not an ICC member				
(England) (Wales) (Scotland) (Republic of Ireland) (Netherlands) 1999	Not eligible; ICC affiliate member							Not eligible; ICC affiliate member				
(South Africa) (Zimbabwe) (Kenya) 2003	Not eligible; ICC affiliate member							Not eligible; ICC affiliate member				
(Cricket West Indies) 2007	Did not qualify							11	5	6	0	0
(India) (Sri Lanka) (Bangladesh) 2011	Did not enter							Did not enter				
(Australia) (New Zealand) 2015	Did not enter							Did not enter				
(England) (Wales) 2019	Did not enter							Did not enter				
(India) 2023	Did not qualify							15	8	6	0	1
(South Africa) (Zimbabwe) (Namibia) 2027	Did not qualify							15	4	9	0	2
Total	—N/a	0/13	–	–	–	–	–	41	17	21	0	3

=== CWC Challenge League ===
Cricket World Cup Challenge League record
Year	League	Position	Pld	W	L	T	NR	P/R
2019–2022	A	3/6	15	8	6	0	1	Same position
2024–2026	A	5/6	15	4	9	0	2	▼
Total	0 Titles	2/2	30	12	15	0	3	—N/a

=== Men's T20 World Cup ===
Men's T20 World Cup record								Qualification record				
Year	Round	Position	Pld	W	L	T	NR	Pld	W	L	T	NR
(South Africa) 2007	Not eligible							Not eligible				
(England) 2009	Not eligible							Not eligible				
(Cricket West Indies) 2010	Not eligible							Not eligible				
(Sri Lanka) 2012	Did not enter							Did not enter				
(Bangladesh) 2014	Did not enter							Did not enter				
(India) 2016	Did not enter							Did not enter				
(United Arab Emirates) (Oman) 2021	Did not qualify							10	6	4	0	0
(Australia) 2022	Did not qualify							4	3	1	0	0
(United States) (Cricket West Indies) 2024	Did not qualify							6	2	4	0	0
(India) (Sri Lanka) 2026	Did not qualify							13	8	5	0	0
(Australia) (New Zealand) 2028	To be determined							6*	4	1	0	1
Total	—N/a	0/10	–	–	–	–	–	39	23	15	0	1

=== T20 World Cup Asia Regional Final ===
T20 World Cup Asia Regional Final (Note: For the 2024 and 2026 Men's T20 World Cups, the final round of qualification in Asia was the ICC Asia Regional Final.) record
Year	Round	Position	Pld	W	L	T	NR	Qual.
(Singapore) 2019	Runners-up	1/5	4	2	2	0	0	DNQ
(Nepal) 2023	Did not qualify							
(Oman) 2025	Super Six	4/9	6	3	3	0	0	DNQ
(To be determined) 2027	Qualified							
Total	0 Titles	3/4	10	5	5	0	0	—N/a

=== Other international tournaments ===
World Cricket League (LA/OD/ODI)
- 2017 (Division Five) : 3rd place

=== Other regional tournaments ===
T20WC Asia Sub-regional Qualifiers (T20I)	Premier Cup/Asia Cup Qualifier (OD/T20I)	ACC Twenty20 Cup (T20)
2018 : Runners-up (Q); 2021 : Runners-up (DNQ); 2023 : 3rd place (DNQ); 2024 : Runners-up (Q); 2026 : 3rd place (Q)	2023 : 9th place (DNQ); 2024 : Group stage (DNQ); 2026 : 6th place (DNQ)	2007 : 9th place; 2009 : 9th place
ACC Trophy (OD)	ACC Trophy Elite (OD)	
2002 : Group stage; 2004 : 4th place; 2006 : 8th place; 2008 (Elite): 9th place	2019 : Runners-up; 2020 : 4th place	

== Youth cricket ==
Qatar have fielded sides in regional competition at Under 15, Under 17 and Under 19 levels.

=== Under 15s ===
The Qatar Under 15 team competed in Asia Cup tournaments in 2002, 2005 and 2006. They failed to progress beyond the first round on all occasions. Even after losing just one game (against Oman) in the group stage of the 2006 competition, they were not allowed to play in the semi-finals as they did not abide by the qualification rules.

=== Under 17s ===
The Qatar Under 17 team competed in the Asia Cup for the first time in 2004, where they did not progress past the first round. In 2005, they reached the quarter-finals.

=== Under 19s ===
The Under 19 team has participated in Asia Cup tournaments in 2001, 2003 and 2005, reaching the semi-finals on the 2003 & 2005 editions. In the 2001 they came runner up in the plate league. Qatar recently also took part in the U-19 Asia Cup although they had a poor time of it. Qatar advanced to Asia Division 2 Semi finals of 2020 Under-19 Cricket World Cup qualification where they lost to Kuwait. They failed to advance from the group stage of Asia Division 2 during 2018 World cup qualification process.

== Home ground ==
West End Park International Cricket Stadium is a home ground of team located in Doha. This is the first cricket stadium in Qatar. In June 2013, the ground was opened for cricket with opening of the Grand Mall Hypermarket on its premise. The stadium can seat 13,000. In December 2013, it was announced the hosting of first-ever triangular women’s One-day and Twenty20 championship in Qatar in January 2014. Women’s international teams from the Pakistan, South Africa and Ireland participated in the seven championship matches. This was the first championship ever to be sanctioned by the International Cricket Council.

In 2015, the stadium was selected to host 1st edition of Pakistan Super League matches which will be played in February, 2016.

Locations of all stadiums which have hosted international cricket matches within Qatar

== Current squad ==
This lists all players who were in the most recent One-day or T20I squads. Uncapped players are listed in italics

Name	Age	Batting style	Bowling style	Forms	Notes
Batters
Kamran Khan	38	Right-handed	Right-arm medium	One-day & T20I	
Zaheer Ibrahim	38	Right-handed	Right-arm off spin	One-day	
Khurram Shahzad	38	Right-handed	Right-arm off spin	One-day	
Saqlain Arshad	34	Right-handed	Right-arm off spin	T20I	
Jassim Khan	27	Right-handed	Right-arm medium	T20I	
Uzair Amir	31	Right-handed		T20I	
All-rounders
Muhammad Tanveer	45	Right-handed	Right-arm medium	One-day & T20I	Vice-captain
Ikramullah Khan	34	Left-handed	Left-arm medium	One-day & T20I	
Akash Babu	36	Left-handed	Right-arm leg spin	One-day & T20I	
Assad Borham	34	Right-handed	Right-arm off spin	One-day & T20I	
Valeed Veetil	40	Right-handed	Right-arm leg spin	One-day & T20I	
Adnan Mirza	37	Right-handed	Slow left-arm orthodox	T20I	
Himanshu Rathod	40	Right-handed	Right-arm off spin	T20I	
Mirza Mohammed Baig	32	Left-handed	Right-arm medium	T20I	
Mohammed Irshad	35	Right-handed	Right-arm medium	T20I	
Wicket-keepers
Imal Liyanage	32	Right-handed		One-day & T20I	
Mohammed Rizlan	41	Right-handed	-	One-day & T20I	Captain
Spin Bowlers
Mohammed Nadeem	43	Right-handed	Slow left-arm orthodox	One-day & T20I	
Yousuf Ali	27	Left-handed	Slow left-arm orthodox	T20I	
Sandun Withanage	34	Left-handed	Right-arm leg spin	One-day	
Bukhar Illikkal	35	Left-handed	Slow left-arm orthodox	T20I	
Owais Ahmed		Left-handed	Slow left-arm orthodox	T20I	
Pace Bowlers
Muhammad Murad	36	Left-handed	Left-arm medium-fast	One-day & T20I	
Gayan Munaweera	35	Left-handed	Left-arm medium-fast	One-day & T20I	
Amir Farooq	31	Right-handed	Left-arm medium-fast	One-day & T20I	
Muhammad Jabir	31	Right-handed	Right-arm medium-fast	T20I	
Bipin Kumar	33	Right-handed	Right-arm medium-fast	T20I	

Updated as on 21 September 2023

== Records ==
International Match Summary — Qatar

Last updated 14 October 2026

Playing Record
Format	M	W	L	T	NR	Inaugural Match
Twenty20 Internationals	91	48	36	4	3	21 January 2019

=== Twenty20 International ===
- Highest team total: 206/7 v. Kuwait on 6 July 2019 at West End Park International Cricket Stadium, Doha.
- Highest individual score: 88*, Muhammad Tanveer v. Bahrain on 18 December 2022 at UKM-YSD Cricket Oval, Bangi.
- Best individual bowling figures: 5/32, Amir Farooq v. Bahrain on 25 November 2024 at West End Park International Cricket Stadium, Doha.

Most T20I runs for Qatar

Player	Runs	Average	Career span
Muhammad Tanveer	1,980	39.60	2019–2025
Imal Liyanage	1,413	26.66	2020–2026
Kamran Khan	864	24.68	2019–2025
Saqlain Arshad	830	20.75	2019–2026
Muhammad Asim	723	40.16	2024–2026

Most T20I wickets for Qatar

Player	Wickets	Average	Career span
Mirza Mohammed Baig	46	15.10	2023–2026
Iqbal Hussain	45	15.40	2019–2021
Mohammed Nadeem	44	22.86	2019–2024
Himanshu Rathod	36	13.52	2023–2024
Ikramullah Khan	36	28.80	2022–2026

T20I record versus other nations

Records complete to T20I #4197. Last updated 14 October 2026.

Opponent	M	W	L	T	NR	First match	First win
vs Test nations
Afghanistan	1	0	1	0	0	11 November 2025	
vs Associate Members
Bahrain	14	9	4	0	1	24 January 2019	24 January 2019
Bhutan	2	2	0	0	0	20 November 2024	20 November 2024
Cambodia	1	1	0	0	0	23 November 2024	23 November 2024
Hong Kong	8	2	5	1	0	27 February 2024	29 February 2024
Japan	1	1	0	0	0	15 October 2025	15 October 2025
Jersey	3	3	0	0	0	9 October 2019	9 October 2019
Kuwait	12	3	7	2	0	22 January 2019	6 July 2019
Malaysia	5	3	1	0	1	27 July 2019	27 July 2019
Maldives	5	5	0	0	0	23 January 2019	23 January 2019
Mongolia	1	0	0	0	1	12 October 2026	
Myanmar	1	1	0	0	0	9 October 2026	9 October 2026
Nepal	4	1	3	0	0	23 July 2019	23 July 2019
Oman	4	1	3	0	0	24 February 2020	24 February 2020
Samoa	1	1	0	0	0	16 October 2025	16 October 2025
Saudi Arabia	14	8	5	1	0	21 January 2019	21 January 2019
Singapore	4	3	1	0	0	22 July 2019	15 December 2022
Thailand	2	2	0	0	0	19 November 2024	19 November 2024
Uganda	3	2	1	0	0	12 February 2020	12 February 2020
United Arab Emirates	5	0	5	0	0	26 February 2020	

== See also ==
- List of Qatar Twenty20 International cricketers
- Qatar women's national cricket team
