= 2015 ACC Twenty20 Cup =

- Administrator: Asian Cricket Council
- Cricket format: Twenty20
- Tournament format: Round-robin
- Host: United Arab Emirates
- Champions: Oman (2nd title)
- Participants: 6
- Matches: 15
- Player of the series: (Kuwait) Aamir Javed
- Most runs: (Kuwait) Aamir Javed (229)
- Most wickets: (Saudi Arabia) Shoaib Ali (15)

The 2015 ACC Twenty20 Cup was an international cricket tournament that was held between 25 and 30 January 2015 in the United Arab Emirates. Oman won the round-robin tournament and qualified for the 2015 ICC World Twenty20 Qualifier, along with Afghanistan, Hong Kong, Nepal and UAE who did not play in this tournament as their T20I status had qualified them directly to the 2015 ICC World Twenty20 Qualifier to be held in Ireland and Scotland. The full members of the ACC (India, Pakistan, Sri Lanka and Bangladesh) automatically qualify for the 2016 ICC World Twenty20 tournament.

== Squads ==
Kuwait	Malaysia	Maldives	Oman	Saudi Arabia	Singapore
Aamir Javed; Abid Mushtaq; Ali Zaheer; Bilal Ahmed; Faizan Ali; Haroon Shahid; Hisham Mirza; Kashif Sharif; Khalid Butt; Mohammad Amin; Mohammed Ghulam; Muhammad Irfan; Raheel Khan; Sibtain Raza	Ahmed Faiz(C); Virandeep Singh; Derek Duraisingam; Hammadullah Khan; Hassan Ghulam; Imran ullah Gul; Khizar Hayat; Pavandeep Singh; Aminuddin Ramly; Shafiq Sharif; Shahrulnizam Yusof; Suhan Alagaratnam; Suharril Fetri; Muhammad Ramli	Abdullah Shahid; Afzal Faiz; Ahmed Ameel; Ahmed Hassan; Hassan Ibrahim; Mihusan Hamid; Mohamed Azzam; Mohamed Rishwan; Mohamed Mahfooz; Muawiyath Ghanee; Leem Shafeeg; Shafraz Jaleel; Shunan Ali; Umar Adam	Aamir Kaleem; Adnan Ilyas; Amir Ali; Munis Ansari; Gayash Dias; Jatinder Singh; Ajay Lalcheta; Muhammad Saeed; Rajeshkumar Ranpura; Shuaib Al Balushi; Sufyan Mehmood; Sultan Ahmed(C); Vaibhav Wategaonkar; Zeeshan Maqsood	Shoaib Ali (C); Abdul Waheed; Adnan Liaquat; Babar Hussain; Bilal Butt; Faheem Afrad; Hammad Saeed; Ibrarul Haq; Mohammad Afzal; Mohammad Nadeem; Mohsin Shabbir; Nasir Abbasi; Shahbaz Rasheed; Zuhair Bukhari	Abhiraj Singh; Amjad Mahboob; Suresh Appusamy; Nishant Chugh; Archit Goenka; Christopher Janik; Chaminda Ruwan; Irfan Madakia; Mohamed Shoib; Arjun Mutreja; Anish Paraam; Rohan Rangarajan; Saad Janjua; Deepak Sarika; Varun Sivaram; Chetan Suryawanshi; Selladore Vijayakumar

== Points table ==
Pos	Team	Pld	W	L	T	NR	Pts	NRR
1	Oman	5	4	1	0	0	8	1.815
2	Kuwait	5	4	1	0	0	8	1.125
3	Saudi Arabia	5	3	2	0	0	6	0.163
4	Singapore	5	2	3	0	0	4	0.550
5	Malaysia	5	2	3	0	0	4	−0.183
6	Maldives	5	0	5	0	0	0	−3.288

Points Table:

Won - 2 points
Lost - 0 points
Tie or No Result- 1 points

== Fixtures ==
25 January
10:00
Scorecard

Malaysia; 156/6 (20 overs)	v	Maldives; 100 (19.5 overs)
Ahmed Faiz 80 (54); Hassan Ibrahim 3/22 (4 overs)		Mohamed Rishwan 36 (29); Derek Duraisingam 3/11 (3.5 overs)

Malaysia won by 56 runs
Al Dhaid Cricket Village, Sharjah
Umpires: Imran Mustafa (Kuwait) and Shabbir Ali (UAE)
Player of the match: Ahmed Faiz (Malaysia)

- Malaysia won the toss and elected to bat.

25 January
10:00
Scorecard

Oman; 167/5 (20 overs)	v	Saudi Arabia; 116 (19.1 overs)
Jatinder Singh 45 (31); Mohammad Nadeem 1/22 (4 overs)		Babar Hussain 24 (22); Ajay Lalcheta 3/22 (4 overs)

Oman won by 51 runs
Sharjah Cricket Stadium, Sharjah
Umpires: Akbar Ali (UAE) and Iftikhar Ali (UAE)
Player of the match: Ajay Lalcheta (Oman)

- Saudi Arabia won the toss and elected to field.

25 January
14:00
Scorecard

Kuwait; 160/8 (20 overs)	v	Singapore; 150/9 (20 overs)
Usman Waheed 54* (34); Suresh Appusamy 1/21 (4 overs)		Kshitij Shinde 43* (44); Khalid Butt 4/26 (4 overs)

Kuwait won by 10 runs
Sharjah Cricket Stadium, Sharjah
Umpires: Akbar Ali (UAE) and Vinay Kumar (Nepal)
Player of the match: Khalid Butt (Kuwait)

- Kuwait won the toss and elected to bat.

26 January
10:00
Scorecard

Kuwait; 159 (19.5 overs)	v	Saudi Arabia; 156/8 (20 overs)
Aamir Javed 44 (26); Shoaib Ali 6/55 (4 overs)		Mohsin Shabbir 44* (42); Sibtain Raza 2/20 (4 overs)

Kuwait won by 3 runs
Al Dhaid Cricket Village, Sharjah
Umpires: Iftikhar Ali (UAE) and Shabbir Ali (UAE)
Player of the match: Kashif Sharif (Kuwait)

- Saudi Arabia won the toss and elected to field.

26 January
10:00
Scorecard

Singapore; 128/8 (20 overs)	v	Maldives; 60 (13.3 overs)
Saad Janjua 38 (32); Ahmed Hassan 3/22 (4 overs)		Abdullah Shahid 21 (19); Suresh Appusamy 4/16 (4 overs)

Singapore won by 68 runs
Sharjah Cricket Stadium, Sharjah
Umpires: Vinay Kumar (Nepal) and Rabiul Hoque (UAE)
Player of the match: Suresh Appusamy (Singapore)

- Singapore won the toss and elected to bat.

26 January
14:00
Scorecard

Oman; 192/3 (20 overs)	v	Malaysia; 146/7 (20 overs)
Jatinder Singh 62 (41); Suharril Fetri 1/10 (3 overs)		Suhan Alagaratnam 34 (21); Aamir Kaleem 2/18 (4 overs)

Oman won by 46 runs
Sharjah Cricket Stadium, Sharjah
Umpires: Imran Mustafa (Kuwait) and Vinay Kumar (Nepal)
Player of the match: Jatinder Singh (Oman)

- Oman won the toss and elected to bat.

27 January
10:00
Scorecard

Singapore; 198/9 (20 overs)	v	Oman; 175/9 (20 overs)
Arjun Mutreja 79 (45); Ajay Lalcheta 3/30 (4 overs)		Jatinder Singh 70 (37); Selladore Vijayakumar 4/20 (4 overs)

Singapore won by 23 runs
Al Dhaid Cricket Village, Sharjah
Umpires: Vinay Kumar (Nepal) and Shabbir Ali (UAE)
Player of the match: Arjun Mutreja (Singapore)

- Singapore won the toss and elected to bat.

27 January
10:00
Scorecard

Maldives; 138/9 (20 overs)	v	Kuwait; 143/1 (8.5 overs)
Afzal Faiz 34 (35); Sibtain Raza 5/27 (4 overs)		Mohammed Irfan 63* (26); Mohamed Mahfooz 1/31 (3 overs)

Kuwait won by 9 wickets
Sharjah Cricket Stadium, Sharjah
Umpires: Ahmed Shah Pakteen (Afghanistan) and Iftikhar Ali (UAE)
Player of the match: Sibtain Raza (Kuwait)

- Maldives won the toss and elected to bat.

27 January
14:00
Scorecard

Saudi Arabia; 176/6 (20 overs)	v	Malaysia; 133/9 (20 overs)
Nasir Abbasi 65 (34); Hassan Ghulam 3/22 (4 overs)		Suhan Alagaratnam 33 (24); Shoaib Ali 5/19 (4 overs)

Saudi Arabia won by 43 runs
Sharjah Cricket Stadium, Sharjah
Umpires: Imran Mustafa (Kuwait) and Rabiul Hoque (UAE)
Player of the match: Shoaib Ali (Saudi Arabia)

- Saudi Arabia won the toss and elected to bat.

29 January
9:30
Scorecard

Maldives; 102/6 (20 overs)	v	Oman; 103/3 (9.1 overs)
Abdullah Shahid 24 (20); Aamir Kaleem 3/17 (4 overs)		Adnan Ilyas 57* (21); Ahmed Hassan 2/18 (3 overs)

Oman won by 7 wickets
Sharjah Cricket Stadium, Sharjah
Umpires: Iftikhar Ali (UAE) and Imran Mustafa (Kuwait)
Player of the match: Adnan Ilyas (Oman)

- Oman won the toss and elected to field.

29 January
13:00
Scorecard

Saudi Arabia; 146/9 (20 overs)	v	Singapore; 138/7 (20 overs)
Hammad Saeed 30 (15); Amjad Mahboob 2/22 (4 overs)		Chaminda Ruwan 45 (40); Shoaib Ali 2/30 (4 overs)

Saudi Arabia won by 8 runs
Sharjah Cricket Stadium, Sharjah
Umpires: Ahmed Shah Pakteen (Afghanistan) and Rabiul Hoque (UAE)
Player of the match: Hammad Saeed (Saudi Arabia)

- Saudi Arabia won the toss and elected to bat.

29 January
16:30
Scorecard

Malaysia; 190/6 (20 overs)	v	Kuwait; 191/8 (19.3 overs)
Suhan Alagaratnam 86 (45); Kashif Sharif 2/24 (4 overs)		Aamir Javed 60 (25); Khizar Hayat 3/21 (4 overs)

Kuwait won by 2 wickets
Sharjah Cricket Stadium, Sharjah
Umpires: Akbar Ali (UAE) and Iftikhar Ali (UAE)
Player of the match: Aamir Javed (Kuwait)

- Malaysia won the toss and elected to bat.

30 January
09:30
Scorecard

Maldives; 73 (18.1 overs)	v	Saudi Arabia; 74/7 (17.2 overs)
Ahmed Hassan 14 (26); Adnan Liaquat 3/11 (3.1 overs)		Shoaib Ali 30* (37); Ahmed Hassan 4/15 (4 overs)

Saudi Arabia won by 3 wickets
Sharjah Cricket Stadium, Sharjah
Umpires: Iftikhar Ali (UAE) and Imran Mustafa (Kuwait)
Player of the match: Shoaib Ali (Saudi Arabia)

- Saudi Arabia won the toss and elected to field.

30 January
13:00
Scorecard

Oman; 149/8 (20 overs)	v	Kuwait; 138/9 (20 overs)
Adnan Ilyas 26 (14); Hisham Mirza 2/20 (4 overs)		Abid Mushtaq 31* (23); Aamir Kaleem 3/18 (4 overs)

Oman won by 11 runs
Sharjah Cricket Stadium, Sharjah
Umpires: Ahmed Shah Pakteen (Afghanistan) and Rabiul Hoque (UAE)
Player of the match: Aamir Kaleem (Oman)

- Oman won the toss and elected to bat.

30 January
16:30
Scorecard

Singapore; 140 (19.5 overs)	v	Malaysia; 144/4 (18 overs)
Anish Paraam 37 (31); Hassan Ghulam 3/23 (4 overs)		Ahmed Faiz 56* (32); Amjad Mahboob 3/23 (4 overs)

Malaysia won by 6 wickets
Sharjah Cricket Stadium, Sharjah
Umpires: Akbar Ali (UAE) and Imran Mustafa (Kuwait)
Player of the match: Ahmed Faiz (Malaysia)

- Singapore won the toss and elected to bat.

== Final standing ==
Position	Team	Status
1	Oman	Qualified for 2015 ICC World Twenty20 Qualifier
2	Kuwait	
3	Saudi Arabia	
4	Singapore	
5	Malaysia	
6	Maldives	

== Statistics ==
=== Most runs ===
The top five run scorers (total runs) are included in this table.

Player	Team	Runs	Inns	Avg	Highest	100s	50s
Aamir Javed	Kuwait	229	5	57.25	60	0	2
Jatinder Singh	Oman	204	5	40.80	70	0	2
Ahmed Faiz	Malaysia	198	5	49.50	80	0	2
Suhan Alagaratnam	Malaysia	174	5	34.80	86	0	1
Kshitij Shinde	Singapore	168	5	84.00	43*	0	0

Source: ESPNcricinfo

=== Most wickets ===
The top five wicket takers, ranked by wickets taken and then by bowling average, are listed in this table.

Player	Team	Overs	Wkts	Ave	SR	Econ	BBI
Shoaib Ali	Saudi Arabia	19.0	15	9.46	7.6	7.47	6/55
Aamir Kaleem	Oman	19.1	10	10.40	11.5	5.42	3/17
Ahmed Hassan	Maldives	15.0	9	9.77	10.0	5.86	4/15
Ajay Lalcheta	Oman	20.0	9	13.88	13.3	6.25	3/22
Rajesh Ranpura	Oman	19.0	9	14.77	12.6	7.00	3/38

Source: ESPNcricinfo

== See also ==
- 2015 ICC World Twenty20 Qualifier
