= 2017 ACC Emerging Teams Asia Cup =

Cricket tournament in Bangladesh

ACC Emerging Teams Asia Cup 2017
- Dates: 27 March 2017 – 3 April 2017
- Administrator: Asian Cricket Council
- Cricket format: List A
- Tournament format(s): Group and Knockout
- Host: Bangladesh
- Champions: Sri Lanka U23 (1st title)
- Runners-up: Pakistan U23
- Participants: 8
- Player of the series: (Sri Lanka) Charith Asalanka
- Most runs: (Sri Lanka) Charith Asalanka (338)
- Most wickets: (Pakistan) Usama Mir (13)

The 2017 ACC Emerging Teams Asia Cup was the second edition of the ACC Emerging Teams Asia Cup held in Bangladesh. Eight teams participated in the tournament including four under-23 age level teams of Test nations and four top associate teams from Asia.This Competition was organized by ACC (Asian Cricket Council).

== Teams ==
Group A	Group B
India U23	Pakistan U23
Sri Lanka U23	Bangladesh U23
Afghanistan Emerging	Nepal
Malaysia	Hong Kong
Source:ACC

== Squads ==
Afghanistan Emerging	Bangladesh U23	Hong Kong	India U23
Shafiqullah (c); Aftab Alam; Fazal Niazai; Gulbadin Naib; Munir Ahmad (wk); Ihsanullah Janat; Najibullah Zadran; Naseeb Zadran; Naveen-ul-Haq; Nawaz Khan; Samiullah Shinwari; Shahidullah; Sharafuddin Ashraf; Usman Ghani; Rashid Khan; Younas Ahmadzai	Mominul Haque (c); Nasir Hossain; Najmul Hossain Shanto; Abul Hasan; Abu Hider; Afif Hossain; Azmir Ahmed; Mohammad Mithun (wk); Mohammad Saifuddin; Nasum Ahmed; Naeem Hasan; Mehidy Hasan Miraz; Saif Hassan; Salman Hossain; Yasir Ali	Anshy Rath (c); Kyle Christie; Christopher Carter (wk); Babar Hayat; Ehsan Khan; Ehsan Nawaz; Cameron McAuslan; Mohammad Awais; Jhatavedh Subramanyan; Nizakat Khan; Wajid Shah; Shahid Wasif; Tanveer Ahmed; Waqas Barkat; Waqas Khan	Baba Aparajith (c); Kannur Lokesh Rahul (wk); Aswin Crist; Rahul Chahar; Shivam Chaudhary; Mayank Dagar; Abhimanyu Easwaran; Aamir Gani; Kamlesh Nagarkoti; Axar Patel; Kanishk Seth; Prithvi Shaw; Shubman Gill; Kuldeep Yadav; Virat Singh
Malaysia	Nepal	Pakistan U23	Sri Lanka U23
Ahmad Faiz (c); Rashid Ahad; Derek Duraisingam; Fikri Makram; Fayyaz Butt; Muhammad Wafiq; Muhammad Hafiz; Norwira Zazmie; Pavandeep Singh; Aminuddin Ramly; Shafiq Sharif; Suharril Fetri; Syed Aziz; Virandeep Singh	Gyanendra Malla; Aarif Sheikh; Aasif Sheikh; Dipendra Singh Airee; Mahaboob Alam; Binod Bhandari; Sushan Bhari; Sunil Dhamala; Bhuvan Karki; Avinash Karn; Sandeep Lamichhane; Dilip Nath; Sagar Pun; Dipesh Shrestha; Sharad Vesawkar	Mohammad Rizwan (c, wk); Ahmed Bashir; Amad Butt; Babar Azam; Ghulam Mudassar; Hammad Azam; Haris Sohail; Shadab Khan; Imam-ul-Haq; Imran Butt; Jaahid Ali; Khushdil Shah; Ahmed Shahzad; Usama Mir; Zafar Gohar	Angelo Perera (c); Amila Aponso; Charith Asalanka; Ron Chandraguptha; Wanindu Hasaranga; Dasun Shanaka; Avishka Fernando; Dhananjaya De Silva; Leo Fransisco; Shehan Jayasuriya; Chamika Karunaratne; Lahiru Samarakoon; Sadeera Samarawickrama; Duvindu Tillakaratne; Kithuruwan Vithanage

== Group stage ==
=== Group A ===
Team	Pld	W	L	T	NR	NRR	Pts
Sri Lanka U23	3	2	1	0	0	+1.367	4
Afghanistan Emerging	3	2	1	0	0	+0.956	4
India U23	3	2	1	0	0	+0.836	4
Malaysia	3	0	3	0	0	−3.201	0

27 March 2017
scorecard

India U23; 288/9 (50 overs)	v	Sri Lanka U23; 253 (48.2 overs)
Baba Aparajith 100 (91); Amila Aponso 2/41 (10 overs)		Charith Asalanka 68 (94); Aswin Crist 3/55 (9.2 overs)

India U23 won by 35 runs
Zahur Ahmed Chowdhury Stadium, Chattogram
Umpires: Sharfuddoula (Ban) and Riazuddin (Pak)
Player of the match: Baba Aparajith (Ind U23)

- Sri Lanka Under-23 won the toss and elected to field.

27 March 2017
scorecard

Afghanistan Emerging Team; 284/7 (50 Overs)	v	Malaysia; 129 (45.5 Overs)
Ihsanullah 108* (107); Derek Duraisingam 4/50 (9 overs)		Shafiq Sharif 36 (68); Aftab Alam 2/15 (6.5 overs)

Afghanistan Emerging Team won by 155 runs
MA Aziz Stadium, Chattogram
Umpires: Mahfuzur Rahman (Ban) and Anisur Rahman (Ban)
Player of the match: Ihsanullah (Afg)

- Afghanistan Emerging Team won the toss and elected to bat.

28 March 2017
scorecard

Sri Lanka U23; 320/6 (50 Overs)	v	Afghanistan Emerging Team; 285 (47.1 Overs)
Charith Asalanka 105 (96); Naveen-ul-Haq 2/66 (10 overs)		Najibullah Zadran 87 (50); Amila Aponso 3/40 (10 overs)

Sri Lanka U23 won by 35 runs
Zahur Ahmed Chowdhury Stadium, Chattogram
Umpires: Sharfuddoula (Ban) and Riazuddin (Pak)
Player of the match: Charith Asalanka (SL U23)

- Sri Lanka Under-23 won the toss and elected to bat.
- Munir Ahmad (Afg) made his List A debut.

28 March 2017
scorecard

Malaysia; 163/9 (50 Overs)	v	India U23; 167/3 (30.1 Overs)
Syed Aziz 53 (80); Aamir Gani 3/27 (10 overs)		Shubman Gill 51* (57); Abdul Mohammad Shukri 2/42 (10 overs)

India U23 won by 7 wickets
MA Aziz Stadium, Chattogram
Umpires: Morshed Ali Khan (Ban) and Anisur Rahman (Ban)
Player of the match: Aamir Gani (Ind U23)

- India Under-23 won the toss and elected to field.

30 March 2017
scorecard

India U23; 242/8 (50 overs)	v	Afghanistan Emerging Team; 246/8 (46.3 overs)
Hanuma Vihari 59* (60); Naveen-ul-Haq 4/54 (10 overs)		Younas Ahmadzai 51 (54); Kamlesh Nagarkoti 2/29 (8 overs)

Afghanistan Emerging Team won by 2 wickets
Zahur Ahmed Chowdhury Stadium, Chattogram
Umpires: Riazuddin (Pak) and Anisur Rahman (Ban)
Player of the match: Naveen-ul-Haq (Afg)

- India Under-23 won the toss and elected to bat.

30 March 2017
scorecard

Sri Lanka U23; 311/9 (50 overs)	v	Malaysia; 106 (27.3 overs)
Sadeera Samarawickrama 121 (123); Derek Duraisingam 3/52 (10 overs)		Aminuddin Ramly 29* (38); Amila Aponso 5/31 (10 overs)

Sri Lanka U23 won by 205 runs
MA Aziz Stadium, Chattogram
Umpires: Sharfuddoula (Ban) and Moniruzzaman (Ban)
Player of the match: Sadeera Samarawickrama (SL U23)

- Sri Lanka Under-23 won the toss and elected to bat.

=== Group B ===
Team	Pld	W	L	T	NR	NRR	Pts
Pakistan U23	3	2	0	1	0	+1.838	5
Bangladesh U23	3	2	0	1	0	+1.756	5
Nepal	3	1	2	0	0	−0.528	2
Hong Kong	3	0	3	0	0	−3.304	0

27 March 2017
sscorecard

Hong Kong; 125 (35.1 Overs)	v	Bangladesh U23; 126/2 (16.1 Overs)
Babar Hayat 37 (74); Nasir Hossain 3/18 (10 overs)		Saif Hassan 57 (47); Ehsan Khan 2/48 (6 overs)

Bangladesh U23 won by 8 wickets
Sheikh Kamal International Cricket Stadium, Cox's Bazar
Umpires: Hemantha Boteju (SL) and Nitin Menon (Ind)
Player of the match: Saif Hassan (Ban U23)

- Hong Kong won the toss and elected to bat.

27 March 2017
scorecard

Nepal; 180/9 (50 Overs)	v	Pakistan U23; 183/4 (45.1 Overs)
Sunil Dhamala 43 (125); Ghulam Mudassar 5/26 (10 overs)		Imam-ul-Haq 105* (136); Gyanendra Malla 2/44 (10 overs)

Pakistan U23 won by 6 wickets
Sheikh Kamal International Cricket Stadium Academy Ground, Cox's Bazar
Umpires: Masudur Rahman (Ban) and Gazi Sohel (Ban)
Player of the match: Ghulam Mudassar (Pak U23)

- Pakistan Under-23 won the toss and elected to field.

28 March 2017
scorecard

Pakistan U23; 327/9 (50 Overs)	v	Hong Kong; 79 (31.2 Overs)
Imam-ul-Haq 120 (124); Ehsan Nawaz 2/68 (10 overs)		Anshuman Rath 27 (43); Usama Mir 7/14 (8.2 overs)

Pakistan U23 won by 248 runs
Sheikh Kamal International Cricket Stadium, Cox's Bazar
Umpires: Masudur Rahman (Ban) and Tanvir Ahmed (Ban)
Player of the match: Usama Mir (Pak U23)

- Pakistan Under-23 won the toss and elected to bat.

28 March 2017
scorecard

Bangladesh U23; 257/9 (50 Overs)	v	Nepal; 174 (42.3 Overs)
Nasir Hossain 109* (115); Avinash Karn 3/46 (8 overs)		Dipendra Singh Airee 56 (85); Rahatul Ferdous 4/45 (7 overs)

Bangladesh U23 won by 83 runs
Sheikh Kamal International Cricket Stadium Academy Ground, Cox's Bazar
Umpires: Hemantha Boteju (SL) and Nitin Menon (Ind)
Player of the match: Nasir Hossain (Ban U23)

- Nepal won the toss and elected to field.

30 March 2017
scorecard

Pakistan U23; 233/8 (50 overs)	v	Bangladesh U23; 233/8 (50 overs)
Haris Sohail 63 (107); Mohammad Saifuddin 3/54 (10 overs)		Mominul Haque 75 (91); Zafar Gohar 2/40 (10 overs)

Match Tied
Sheikh Kamal International Cricket Stadium, Cox's Bazar
Umpires: Hemantha Boteju (SL) and Nitin Menon (Ind)
Player of the match: Hussain Talat (Pak U23)

- Pakistan Under-23 won the toss and elected to bat.
- Azmir Ahmed, Afif Hossain and Nayeem Hasan (Ban) all made their List A debut.

30 March 2017
scorecard

Hong Kong; 214 (50 overs)	v	Nepal; 220/3 (44.2 overs)
Anshuman Rath 51 (60); Avinash Karn 3/29 (5 overs)		Gyanendra Malla 70 (82); Jhatavedh Subramanyan 2/31 (10 overs)

Nepal won by 7 wickets
Sheikh Kamal International Cricket Stadium Academy Ground, Cox's Bazar
Umpires: Masudur Rahman (Ban) and Akteruzzaman (Ban)
Player of the match: Gyanendra Malla (Nep)

- Nepal won the toss and elected to field.

== Knockout stage ==
=== Semi-final 1 ===
1 April 2017
scorecard

Bangladesh U23; 179 (49.3 overs)	v	Sri Lanka U23; 180/2(38.5 overs)
Nasir Hossain 39 (59); Asitha Fernando 4/32 (10 overs)		Sadeera Samarawickrama 88* (100); Nayeem Hasan 1/28 (10 overs)

Sri Lanka U23 won by 8 wickets
Zahur Ahmed Chowdhury Stadium, Chattogram
Umpires: Nitin Menon (Ind) and Riazuddin (Pak)
Player of the match: Asitha Fernando (SL U23)

- Bangladesh Under-23 won the toss and elected to bat.

=== Semi-final 2 ===
1 April 2017
scorecard

Pakistan U23; 267/5 (50 overs)	v	Afghanistan Emerging Team; 144 (31.4 overs)
Mohammad Rizwan 105* (99); Gulbadin Naib 3/51 (10 overs)		Najibullah Zadran 31 (25); Bilal Asif 5/40 (8.4 overs)

Pakistan U23 won by 123 runs
MA Aziz Stadium, Chattogram
Umpires: Anisur Rahman (Ban) and Sharfuddoula (Ban)
Player of the match: Mohammad Rizwan (Pak U23)

- Afghanistan Emerging Team won the toss and elected to field.

=== Final ===
3 April 2017
scorecard

Pakistan U23; 133 (42.1 overs)	v	Sri Lanka U23; 134/5 (23.5 overs)
Usama Mir 26 (43); Shehan Jayasuriya 3/22 (6 overs)		Sadeera Samarawickrama 45 (42); Sameen Gul 2/33 (7 overs)

Sri Lanka U23 won by 5 wickets
Zahur Ahmed Chowdhury Stadium, Chattogram
Umpires: Nitin Menon (Ind) and Sharfuddoula (Ban)
Player of the match: Shehan Jayasuriya (SL U23)

- Pakistan Under-23 won the toss and elected to bat.

== See also ==
- 2013 ACC Emerging Teams Cup
