= 2012 ACC Trophy Elite =

- Administrator: Asian Cricket Council
- Cricket format: 50 overs per side
- Tournament format: Round robin with playoffs
- Host: United Arab Emirates
- Champions: Nepal (1st title) / United Arab Emirates (5th title)
- Participants: 10 teams
- Matches: 27
- Player of the series: (Nepal) Paras Khadka
- Most runs: (Nepal) Paras Khadka (291)
- Most wickets: (Nepal) Shakti Gauchan (15) (Malaysia) Anwar Rahman (15)
- Official website: Tournament home

The 2012 ACC Trophy Elite is a cricket tournament in UAE, taking place between 3 and 12 October 2012. It gives Associate and Affiliate members of the Asian Cricket Council experience of international one-day cricket and also helps form an essential part of regional rankings. This was the final ACC Trophy tournament as ACC split two-tier ACC Trophy into three-tier round robin ACC Premier League starting from 2014.

== Teams ==
- Afghanistan (1st in 2010 ACC Trophy Elite)
- Nepal (2nd in 2010 ACC Trophy Elite)
- Hong Kong (3rd in 2010 ACC Trophy Elite)
- Malaysia (4th in 2010 ACC Trophy Elite)
- United Arab Emirates (5th in 2010 ACC Trophy Elite)
- Oman (6th in 2010 ACC Trophy Elite)
- Kuwait (7th in 2010 ACC Trophy Elite)
- Bhutan (8th in 2010 ACC Trophy Elite)
- Maldives (Promoted as winners of 2010 ACC Trophy Challenge)
- Saudi Arabia (Promoted as runners up of 2010 ACC Trophy Challenge)

== Squads ==
Afghanistan	Bhutan	Hong Kong	Kuwait	Malaysia
Nawroz Mangal (c); Karim Sadiq (vc) (wk); Javed Ahmadi; Afsar Zazai (wk); Mohammad Nabi; Gulbodin Naib; Mohibullah Paak; Rahmat Shah; Mohammad Shahzad (wk); Samiullah Shenwari; Sayed Shirzad; Asghar Afghan; Dawlat Zadran; Shapoor Zadran	Jigme Singye (c); Tshering Dorji (vc) (wk); Dampo Dorji; Nima Gurung; Sanjeevan Gurung; Bikash Luitel; Kencho Norbu (wk); Suprit Pradhan; Dilip Subba; Kumar Subba; Sonam Tobgay; Barun Wakhley; Phuntsho Wangdi; Lobzang Yonten	Jamie Atkinson (c); Nizakat Khan (vc); Tanwir Afzal; Irfan Ahmed; Nadeem Ahmed; Waqas Barkat (wk); Babar Hayat (wk); Mudassar Hussain; Aizaz Khan; Li Kai Ming; Anshuman Rath; Daljeet Singh; Karan Shah; Kinchit Shah (wk)	Hisham Mirza (c); Mohammad Ahsan; Abdullah Akhunzada; Mohammad Amin; Irfan Bhatti; Yohan Chandana; Saud Galsukar; Saad Khalid; Abid Mushtaq; Alvin Patel; Sibtain Raza (wk); Jagath Roshantha; Ali Shahzad; Kashif Sharif	Suhan Alagaratnam (c); Ahmed Faiz; Anwar Arudin; Suharril Fetri; Faruq Hakimin; Faizal Abu Hasan; Khizar Hayat; Syazrul Idrus; Aminudin Ramly; Anwar Rahman; Nazril Rahman; Rashid Ahad; Shafiq Sharif (wk); Norwira Zazmie

Maldives	Nepal	Oman	Saudi Arabia	United Arab Emirates
Moosa Kaleem (c); Mohamed Azzam; Ahmed Faiz; Mihusan Hamid; Hassan Ibrahim; Husham Ibrahim; Mohotte Jayakody; Mohamed Mahfooz; Ahmed Mauroof; Neesham Nasir; Ismail Nihad; Mohamed Rishwan (wk); Abdullah Shahid; Shafraz Jaleel (wk)	Paras Khadka (C); Gyanendra Malla (vc); Pradeep Airee (wk); Prithu Baskota; Binod Bhandari; Amrit Bhattarai; Binod Das; Bhuwan Karki; Anil Mandal; Subash Khakurel (wk); Sharad Vesawkar; Shakti Gauchan; Basanta Regmi; Sanjam Regmi	Hemal Mehta (c); Sultan Ahmed (wk); Amir Ali; Khawar Ali; Adnan Ilyas; Aamir Kaleem; Yousuf Mahmood; Zeeshan Maqsood; Rajeshkumar Ranpura; Khalid Rasheed; Masthan Sheikh; Zeeshan Siddiqui; Jatinder Singh; Vaibhav Wategaonkar	Nadeem Al-Nadwi (c); Mohammad Afzal; Ifthakar Ali; Nazeer Faaroqui; Syed Hassan (wk); Javaid Iqbal; Suhrab Kilsingatakam; Sufyan Lehri; Mohammad Mohsin; Mohammad Nadeem; Mohammad Ramzan; Omar Sohail; Abdul Qadir; Omar Zafar	Khurram Khan (c); Fayyaz Ahmed; Arshad Ali; Saqib Ali; Shaiman Anwar; Mohammad Azam; Manjula Guruge; Haroon Iftikhar; Amjad Javed; Rohan Mustafa; Ahmed Raza; Abdul Shakoor (wk); Shadeep Silva; Mohammad Tauqir

== Group stages ==
=== Group A ===
Pos	Team	Pld	W	L	T	NR	Pts	NRR
1	Afghanistan	4	4	0	0	0	8	2.237
2	Malaysia	4	3	1	0	0	6	1.031
3	Oman	4	2	2	0	0	4	1.758
4	Maldives	4	1	3	0	0	2	−1.106
5	Bhutan	4	0	4	0	0	0	−5.347

3 October
Scorecard

Afghanistan; 234/8 (50 overs)	v	Malaysia; 198/6 (50 overs)
Samiullah Shenwari 56 (84); Aminuddin Ramly 2/20 (5 overs)		Shafiq Sharif 75* (84); Gulbodin Naib 3/17 (7 overs)

Afghanistan won by 36 runs
Sheikh Zayed Stadium, Abu Dhabi
Umpires: Iftikhar Ali (UAE) and Vinay Kumar (Nep)
Player of the match: Mohammad Nabi (Afg)

- Malaysia won the toss and elected to field

3 October
Scorecard

Oman; 415/5 (50 overs)	v	Bhutan; 103 (21.2 overs)
Zeeshan Maqsood 199 (159); Jigme Singye 2/87 (10 overs)		Thinley Jamtsho 42 (45); Adnan Ilyas 6/33 (8 overs)

Oman won by 312 runs
Al Dhaid Cricket Village, Sharjah
Umpires: Fidel Jaary (UAE) and Mohammed Younis (Bah)
Player of the match: Zeeshan Maqsood (Oma)

- Oman won the toss and elected to bat

4 October
Scorecard

Afghanistan; 268/8 (50 overs)	v	Oman; 194 (48 overs)
Mohammad Shahzad 100 (107); Zeeshan Siddiqui 5/45 (9 overs)		Zeeshan Siddiqui 69 (70); Dawlat Zadran 3/32 (10 overs)

Afghanistan won by 74 runs
Sheikh Zayed Stadium, Abu Dhabi
Umpires: Fidel Jaary (UAE) and Tahir Mahmood (Kuw)
Player of the match: Zeeshan Siddiqui (Oma)

- Oman won the toss and elected to field

4 October
Scorecard

Bhutan; 146 (49.1 overs)	v	Maldives; 150/4 (24.3 overs)
Sonam Tobgay 45 (73); Ismail Nihad 2/22 (8.1 overs)		Mohamed Rishwan 54* (47); Phuntsho Wangdi 2/46 (6.3 overs)

Maldives won by 6 wickets
ICC Global Cricket Academy Ground No 1, Dubai
Umpires: Vinay Kumar (Nep) and Khalil Ullah (Sau)
Player of the match: Mohamed Rishwan (Mal)

- Bhutan won the toss and elected to bat

6 October
Scorecard

Oman; 159 (44.1 overs)	v	Malaysia; 162/8 (48 overs)
Vaibhav Wategaonkar 57 (90); Nazril Rahman 5/18 (9 overs)		Aminuddin Ramly 45 (51); Aamir Kaleem 2/18 (8 overs)

Malaysia won by 2 wickets
Nursery Oval, Abu Dhabi
Umpires: Khalil Ullah (Sau) and Mohammed Younis (Bah)
Player of the match: Nazril Rahman (Mas)

- Malaysia won the toss and elected to field

6 October
Scorecard

Maldives; 143 (44.2 overs)	v	Afghanistan; 148/4 (25.5 overs)
Mohotte Jayakody 46 (101); Sayed Shirzad 3/23 (6 overs)		Mohammad Nabi 35* (13); Ismail Nihad 2/29 (7 overs)

Afghanistan won by 6 wickets
ICC Global Cricket Academy Ground No 2, Dubai
Umpires: John Saloman (Kuw) and Tahir Mahmood (Kuw)
Player of the match: Mohammad Nabi (Afg)

- Malaysia won the toss and elected to field

7 October
Scorecard

Maldives; 146 (38 overs)	v	Malaysia; 147/3 (32.3 overs)
Mohamed Rishwan 44 (43); Anwar Rahman 5/27 (10 overs)		Ahmed Faiz 66* (106); Ismail Nihad 1/25 (4 overs)

Malaysia won by 7 wickets
Sharjah Cricket Stadium, Sharjah (city)
Umpires: Imran Mustafa (Kuw) and Khalil Ullah (Sau)
Player of the match: Anwar Rahman (Mas)

- Maldives won the toss and elected to bat

7 October
Scorecard

Bhutan; 107 (37.4 overs)	v	Afghanistan; 108/2 (13.2 overs)
Jigme Singye 66* (106); Sayed Shirzad 5/13 (5.4 overs)		Nawroz Mangal 58* (40); Suprit Pradhan 1/25 (3 overs)

Afghanistan won by 8 wickets
ICC Global Cricket Academy Ground No 1, Dubai
Umpires: Riaz Chaudhry (Kuw) and AR Srinivasan (Oma)
Player of the match: Sayed Shirzad (Afg)

- Bhutan won the toss and elected to bat

9 October
Scorecard

Bhutan; 84 (32 overs)	v	Malaysia; 88/2 (13 overs)
Barun Wakhley 19 (18); Anwar Rahman 4/29 (9 overs)		Ahmed Faiz 37* (36); Barun Wakhley 1/26 (5 overs)

Malaysia won by 8 wickets
Nursery Oval, Abu Dhabi
Umpires: Ishtiaq Amjad (Oma) and Mohammed Younis (Bah)
Player of the match: Anwar Rahman (Mas)

- Malaysia won the toss and elected to field

9 October
Scorecard

Oman; 225/6 (50 overs)	v	Maldives; 102 (26 overs)
Zeeshan Maqsood 50 (67); Moosa Kaleem 3/19 (10 overs)		Moosa Kaleem 34 (38); Khalid Rasheed 4/34 (10 overs)

Oman won by 123 runs
Al Dhaid Cricket Village, Sharjah
Umpires: John Saloman (Kuw) and Tahir Mahmood (Kuw)
Player of the match: Khalid Rasheed (Oma)

- Oman won the toss and elected to bat

=== Group B ===
Pos	Team	Pld	W	L	T	NR	Pts	NRR
1	Nepal	4	3	1	0	0	6 (Note: Nepal wins head-to-head against UAE)	1.565
2	United Arab Emirates	4	3	1	0	0	6	1.780
3	Hong Kong	4	2	2	0	0	4	0.419
4	Kuwait	4	2	2	0	0	4	−0.065
5	Saudi Arabia	4	0	4	0	0	0	−4.189

Notes:

3 October
Scorecard

United Arab Emirates; 133 (40.5 overs)	v	Nepal; 134/6 (45.2 overs)
Mohammad Azam 33 (25); Shakti Gauchan 5/32 (8.5 overs)		Anil Mandal 63 (129); Manjula Guruge 3/25 (8 overs)

Nepal won the match by 4 wickets.
Sharjah Cricket Stadium, Sharjah
Umpires: John Saloman (Kuw) and AR Srinivasan (Oma)
Player of the match: Anil Mandal (Nep)

- United Arab Emirates won the toss and elected to bat

3 October
Scorecard

Hong Kong; 278 (48 overs)	v	Saudi Arabia; 69 (22.1 overs)
Nizakat Khan 65 (70); Mohammad Nadeem 3/40 (9 overs)		Syed Hassan 14 (25); Nadeem Ahmed 4/5 (7 overs)

Hong Kong won by 209 runs
ICC Global Cricket Academy Ground No 2, Dubai
Umpires: Ishtiaq Amjad (Oma) and Afzalkhan Pathan (Oma)
Player of the match: Nizakat Khan (Hkg)

- Hong Kong won the toss and elected to bat

4 October
Scorecard

Kuwait; 177 (49.1 overs)	v	Hong Kong; 178/5 (42.4 overs)
Mohammad Amin 40 (61); Nizakat Khan 3/35 (9 overs)		Jamie Atkinson 48 (50); Saad Khalid 1/22 (4.4 overs)

Hong Kong won by 5 wickets
Sheikh Zayed Stadium, Abu Dhabi
Umpires: Iftikhar Ali (UAE) and AR Srinivasan (Oma)
Player of the match: Nizakat Khan (Hkg)

- Kuwait won the toss and elected to bat

4 October
Scorecard

Saudi Arabia; 116 (37.4 overs)	v	United Arab Emirates; 117/3 (14.1 overs)
Mohammad Nadeem 43* (81); Ahmed Raza 4/25 (8 overs)		Shaiman Anwar 60 (29); Ifthakar Ali 2/31 (5 overs)

United Arab Emirates won by 7 wickets
Nursery Oval, Abu Dhabi
Umpires: Imran Mustafa (Kuw) and Riaz Chaudhry (Kuw)
Player of the match: Ahmed Raza (UAE)

- Saudi Arabia won the toss and elected to bat

6 October
Scorecard

Nepal; 280/4 (50 overs)	v	Kuwait; 285/6 (46.2 overs)
Paras Khadka 106* (77); Hisham Mirza 1/21 (4 overs)		Sibtain Raza 77 (84); Shakti Gauchan 2/40 (8 overs)

Kuwait won by 4 wickets
Al Dhaid Cricket Village, Sharjah
Umpires: Iftikhar Ali (UAE) and AR Srinivasan (Oma)
Player of the match: Sibtain Raza (Kuw)

- Nepal won the toss and elected to bat

6 October
Scorecard

Hong Kong; 215 (50 overs)	v	United Arab Emirates; 218/4 (42.2 overs)
Nizakat Khan 40 (75); Ahmed Raza 3/27 (10 overs)		Shaiman Anwar 83 (111); Irfan Ahmed 1/26 (4 overs)

United Arab Emirates won by 6 wickets
ICC Global Cricket Academy Ground No 1, Dubai
Umpires: Afzalkhan Pathan (Oma) and Riaz Chaudhry (Kuw)
Player of the match: Shaiman Anwar (UAE)

- United Arab Emirates won the toss and elected to field

7 October
Scorecard

Saudi Arabia; 131 (48.2 overs)	v	Nepal; 133/1 (13.1 overs)
Ifthakar Ali 28* (47); Basanta Regmi 3/29 (10 overs)		Gyanendra Malla 61* (23); Mohammad Nadeem 1/37 (2 overs)

Nepal won by 9 wickets
Sheikh Zayed Stadium, Abu Dhabi
Umpires: Fidel Jaary (UAE) and Afzalkhan Pathan (Oma)
Player of the match: Gyanendra Malla (Nep)

- Nepal won the toss and elected to field

7 October
Scorecard

United Arab Emirates; 353 (49.4 overs)	v	Kuwait; 212 (36.5 overs)
Abdul Shakoor 79 (46); Saad Khalid 2/64 (10 overs)		Irfan Bhatti 44 (36); Arshad Ali 3/39 (5 overs)

United Arab Emirates won by 141 runs
Al Dhaid Cricket Village, Sharjah
Umpires: Ishtiaq Amjad (Oma) and Vinay Kumar (Nep)
Player of the match: Arshad Ali (UAE)

- Kuwait won the toss and elected to field

9 October
Scorecard

Kuwait; 318/7 (50 overs)	v	Saudi Arabia; 175 (37.3 overs)
Irfan Bhatti 64 (56); Mohammad Nadeem 2/41 (10 overs)		Mohammad Afzal 40 (50); Ali Shahzad 4/25 (10 overs)

Kuwait won by 143 runs
Sheikh Zayed Stadium, Abu Dhabi
Umpires: Iftikhar Ali (UAE) and Vinay Kumar (Nep)
Player of the match: Ali Shahzad (Kuw)

- Kuwait won the toss and elected to bat

9 October
Scorecard

Nepal; 225/5 (50 overs)	v	Hong Kong; 100 (37 overs)
Paras Khadka 61 (54); Nizakat Khan 2/34 (10 overs)		Babar Hayat 27* (50); Basanta Regmi 3/20 (9 overs)

Nepal won by 125 runs
ICC Global Cricket Academy Ground No 1, Dubai
Umpires: Imran Mustafa (Kuw) and Riaz Chaudhry (Kuw)
Player of the match: Paras Khadka (Nep)

- Nepal won the toss and elected to bat

== Play-offs ==
=== 9th place play-off ===
10 October
Scorecard

Bhutan; 165 (37 overs)	v	Saudi Arabia; 170/3 (22 overs)
Suprit Pradhan 38 (45); Mohammad Ramzan 4/38 (8 overs)		Mohammad Afzal 59* (47); Sonam Tobgay 1/10 (2 overs)

Saudi Arabia won by 7 wickets
ICC Global Cricket Academy Ground No 2, Dubai
Umpires: Ishtiaq Amjad (Oma) and Mohammed Younis (Bah)
Player of the match: Mohammad Afzal (KSA)

- Saudi Arabia won the toss and elected to field

=== 7th place play-off ===
10 October
Scorecard

Maldives; 167/8 (35 overs)	v	Kuwait; 168/3 (25.4 overs)
Mohamed Rishwan 32 (47); Abdullah Akhunzada 3/30 (7 overs)		Kashif Sharif 69 (62); Ahmed Mauroof 2/41 (5 overs)

Kuwait won by 7 wickets
Nursery Oval, Abu Dhabi
Umpires: Fidel Jaary (UAE) and Afzalkhan Pathan (Oma)
Player of the match: Kashif Sharif (Kuw)

- Kuwait won the toss and elected to field
- Match reduced to 35 overs per innings due to fog

=== 5th place play-off ===
10 October
Scorecard

Hong Kong; 213 (48.5 overs)	v	Oman; 206 (48.5 overs)
Tanwir Afzal 106 (78); Khalid Rasheed 4/31 (10 overs)		Aamir Kaleem 63* (84); Mudassar Hussain 3/29 (9 overs)

Hong Kong won by 7 runs.
Al Dhaid Cricket Village, Sharjah
Umpires: Khalil Ullah (Sau) and Tahir Mahmood (Kwt)
Player of the match: Tanwir Afzal (Hkg)

- Hong Kong won the toss and elected to bat.

== Semi-finals ==
Semi-finals
10 October – Dubai
Afghanistan	70/10 (30.4 ov)
United Arab Emirates	71/2 (23.4 ov)
10 October – Abu Dhabi
Nepal	241/9 (45 ov)
Malaysia	220/9 (45 ov)

Final
12 October – Sharjah
United Arab Emirates	241/6 (50 ov)
Nepal	241/9 (50 ov)
Third place
12 October – Dubai
Afghanistan	199/2 (23.5 ov)
Malaysia	198/10 (49.5 ov)

10 October
Scorecard

Afghanistan; 70 (30.4 overs)	v	United Arab Emirates; 71/2 (23.4 overs)
Javed Ahmadi 29(65); Ahmed Raza 3/6 (5 overs)		Haroon Iftikhar 34* (64); Shapoor Zadran 1/6 (5 overs)

United Arab Emirates won by 8 wickets
ICC Global Cricket Academy Ground No 2, Dubai
Umpires: Vinay Kumar (Nep) and AR Srinivasan (Omn)
Player of the match: Ahmed Raza (UAE)

- Afghanistan won the toss and elected to bat

10 October
Scorecard

Nepal; 241/9 (45 overs)	v	Malaysia; 220/9 (45 overs)
Paras Khadka 89 (96); Nazril Rahman 4/37 (9 overs)		Suhan Alagaratnam 43 (51); Prithu Baskota 3/47 (8 overs)

Nepal won by 21 runs.
Sheikh Zayed Stadium, Abu Dhabi
Umpires: Iftikhar Ali (Kwt) and Riaz Chaudhry (Kwt)
Player of the match: Paras Khadka (Nep)

- Malaysia won the toss and elected to field
- Match reduced to 45 overs per innings due to fog

=== 3rd place play-off ===
12 October
Scorecard

Afghanistan; 199/2 (23.5 overs)	v	Malaysia; 198 (49.5 overs)
Mohammad Shahzad 92* (69); Norwira Zazmie 1/7 (0.5 overs)		Shafiq Sharif 69 (93); Gulbudeen Naib 2/23 (4.5 overs)

Afghanistan won by 8 wickets
ICC Global Cricket Academy Ground No 2, Dubai
Umpires: Riaz Chaudhry (Kuw) and AR Srinivasan (Oma)
Player of the match: Mohammad Shahzad (Afg)

- Afghanistan won the toss and elected to field
- Afghanistan won 3rd place play-off

== Final ==
12 October
Scorecard

United Arab Emirates; 241/6 (50 overs)	v	Nepal; 241/9 (50 overs)
Saqib Ali 101* (103); Shakti Gauchan 3/36 (10 overs)		Subash Khakurel 55 (74); Ahmed Raza 2/44 (10 overs)

Match Tied
Sharjah Cricket Stadium, Sharjah
Umpires: Imran Mustafa (Kwt) and John Saloman (Kwt)
Player of the match: Saqib Ali (UAE)

- Nepal won the toss and elected to field
- Nepal and United Arab Emirates shared trophy

== Final Placings ==
Pos	Team	Notes
1st	Nepal	Shared trophy and qualified for the 2014 ACC Premier League
1st	United Arab Emirates	Shared trophy and qualified for the 2014 ACC Premier League
3rd	Afghanistan	Qualified for the 2014 ACC Premier League
4th	Malaysia	Qualified for the 2014 ACC Premier League
5th	Hong Kong	Qualified for the 2014 ACC Premier League
6th	Oman	Qualified for the 2014 ACC Premier League
7th	Kuwait	Qualified for 2014 ACC Ellite League
8th	Maldives	Qualified for 2014 ACC Ellite League
9th	Saudi Arabia	Qualified for 2014 ACC Ellite League
10th	Bhutan	Qualified for 2014 ACC Ellite League

== Statistics ==
=== Most runs ===
The top five run scorers are included in this table.

Player	Team	Runs	Inns	Avg	S/R	HS	100s	50s
Paras Khadka	Nepal	291	5	72.75	106.20	106*	1	2
Zeeshan Maqsood	Oman	249	4	62.25	107.79	199	1	1
Saqib Ali	United Arab Emirates	222	4	74.00	81.02	101*	1	1
Kashif Sharif	Kuwait	219	5	43.80	86.22	69	0	2
Mohammad Shahzad	Afghanistan	217	4	72.33	104.83	104*	1	1

=== Most wickets ===
The following table contains the five leading wicket-takers.

Player	Team	Wkts	Mts	Avg	S/R	Econ	BBI
Shakti Gauchan	Nepal	15	6	11.00	20.7	3.18	5/32
Anwar Rahman	Malaysia	15	6	12.73	19.2	3.96	5/27
Ahmed Raza	United Arab Emirates	14	5	10.42	17.1	3.65	4/25
Nazril Rahman	Malaysia	13	6	15.46	21.2	4.36	5/18
Zeeshan Siddiqui	Oman	11	5	9.63	11.0	5.21	5/45
