= 2014 ACC Premier League =

ACC Premier League 2014
- Administrator: Asian Cricket Council
- Cricket format: One Day International, 50 overs
- Tournament format: League system
- Host: Malaysia
- Champions: Afghanistan (1st title)
- Participants: 6
- Matches: 15
- Player of the series: (Hong Kong) Irfan Ahmed
- Most runs: (Afghanistan) Usman Ghani (228)
- Most wickets: (Nepal) Sompal Kami (15)

ACC Premier League, the three-tier tournament was evolved from the former two-tier ACC Trophy cricket competition. The 2014–15 season started with the top-tier tournament which was held in Malaysia in May. It gives Associate and Affiliate members of the Asian Cricket Council experience of international one-day cricket and also helps form an essential part of regional rankings. Some of the individual matches were given One Day International (ODI) status by the International Cricket Council (ICC).

The top four teams of top-tier tournament, Afghanistan, UAE, Nepal and Oman qualified for the 2014 ACC Championship, while Hong Kong and Malaysia remained in the 2016 ACC Premier League. In the second division held in Singapore between 7–13 July, the host winning the tournament also qualified for the same tournament. Results of the ACC Premier League 2014 was determined on rankings in the final table. If two or more teams had equal points, rankings were decided by net run-rate.

== Teams ==
- Nepal – 1st in 2012 ACC Trophy Elite (tied with UAE)
- United Arab Emirates – 1st in 2012 ACC Trophy Elite (tied with Nepal)
- Afghanistan – 3rd in 2012 ACC Trophy Elite
- Malaysia – 4th in 2012 ACC Trophy Elite
- Hong Kong – 5th in 2012 ACC Trophy Elite
- Oman – 6th in 2012 ACC Trophy Elite

== Squads ==
Nepal	United Arab Emirates	Afghanistan	Malaysia	Hong Kong	Oman
Paras Khadka (c); Gyanendra Malla (vc); Subash Khakurel (wk); Mehboob Alam; Binod Bhandari; Naresh Budhayer; Shakti Gauchan; Ramnaresh Giri; Sompal Kami; Rohan Bhujhel; Mandip Phuyal; Basanta Regmi; Aarif Sheikh; Sharad Vesawkar	Khurram Khan (c); Amjad Ali (wk); Abdul Haq; Ahmed Raza; Fayyaz Ahmed; Irfan Sajjad; Kamran Shazad; Krishnachandran Karate; Mohammad Naveed; Mohammad Shahzad; Noor-ul-Amin; Swapnil Patil; Salman Faris; Shaiman Anwar	Mohammad Nabi (c); Shafiqullah (wk); Aftab Alam; Amir Hamza; Dawlat Zadran; Hashmatullah Shaidi; Mirwais Ashraf; Mohammad Mujtaba; Nasir Ahmadzai; Noor Ali Zadran; Rahmat Shah; Samiullah Shenwari; Shapoor Zadran; Usman Ghani	Ahmed Faiz (c); Shafiq Sharif (wk); Anwar Arudin; Hammadullah Khan; Hassan Ghulam; Hiran Ralalage; Irfan Zarbani; Khizar Hayat; Nasir Shafiq; Pavandeep Singh; Shahrulnizam Yusof; Shukri Rahim; Suhan Alagaratnam; Suharril Fetri; Suresh Navaratnam	Jamie Atkinson (c, wk); Aizaz Khan; Ankur Sharma; Babar Hayat; Ehsan Nawaz; Haseeb Amjad; Irfan Ahmed; Roy Lamsam; Nadeem Ahmed; Nizakat Khan; Skhawat Ali; Tanwir Afzal; Waqas Barkat	Sultan Ahmed (c, wk); Aamir Kaleem; Amir Ali; Munis Ansari; Arif Hussain; Jatinder Singh; Khawar Ali; Ajay Lalcheta; Mohammad Nadeem; Rajesh Ranpura; Shuaib Al Balushi; Vaibhav Wategaonkar; Zeeshan Maqsood; Zeeshan Siddiqui

== Points table ==
Pos	Team	Pld	W	L	T	NR	Pts	NRR
1	Afghanistan	5	4	1	0	0	8	1.062
2	United Arab Emirates	5	3	2	0	0	6	0.214
3	Nepal	5	3	2	0	0	6	−0.024
4	Oman	5	3	2	0	0	6	−0.082
5	Hong Kong	5	1	4	0	0	2	−0.132
6	Malaysia	5	1	4	0	0	2	−0.951

== Matches ==
1 May
9:30 AM
Scorecard

Malaysia; 195 (40.2 overs)	v	Oman; 269/6 (50.0 overs)
Ahmed Faiz 70 (90); Zeeshan Siddiqui 3/24 (4 overs)		Zeeshan Maqsood 77 (108); Hassan Ghulam 4/72 (10 overs)

Oman won by 74 runs
Kinrara Academy Oval, Kuala Lumpur
Umpires: VK Jha & U Kaluhetti
Player of the match: Aamir Kaleem (Oman)

- Oman won the toss and chose to bat

1 May
9:30 AM
Scorecard

Afghanistan; 218/4 (43.1 overs)	v	Hong Kong*; 216 (49.3 overs)
Usman Ghani 70 (68); Ehsan Nawaz 1/19 (3 overs)		Babar Hayat 53 (66); Amir Hamza 3/30 (10 overs)

Afghanistan won by 6 wickets
Bayuemas Oval, Kuala Lumpur
Umpires: Buddhi Pradhan & Sarika Prasad
Player of the match: Usman Ghani (Afghanistan)

- Afghanistan won the toss and chose to field
- Full ODI match.
- Usman Ghani (Afg), Ankur Vasishta, Babar Hayat, Ehsan Nawaz, Haseeb Amjad, Nizakat Khan, Tanwir Afzal and Waqas Barkat (all HK) made their ODI debuts.

1 May
9:30 AM
Scorecard

Nepal; 195/6 (39.5 overs)	v	United Arab Emirates; 191 (48.1 overs)
Subash Khakurel 71 (91); Fayyaz Ahmed 2/49 (9.5 overs)		Swapnil Patil 76 (95); Mehboob Alam 3/21 (8 overs)

Nepal won by 4 wickets
Selangor Turf Club, Selangor
Umpires: Shafizan Shahriman & N Sivan
Player of the match: Subash Khakurel (Nepal)

- Nepal won the toss and chose to field

2 May
9:30 AM
Scorecard

United Arab Emirates; 232 (44.3 overs)	v	Afghanistan*; 302/5 (50.0 overs)
Amjad Ali 98 (107); Rahmat Shah 5/32 (5.3 overs)		Samiullah Shenwari 82* (68); Khurram Khan 2/33 (8 overs)

Afghanistan won by 70 runs
Kinrara Academy Oval, Kuala Lumpur
Umpires: Buddhi Pradhan and Sarika Prasad
Player of the match: Mohammad Nabi (Afghanistan)

- United Arab Emirates won the toss and chose to field
- Full ODI match.
- Fayyaz Ahmed, Irfan Sajid, Krishna Karate, Mohammad Naveed and Mohammad Shahzad (all UAE) made their ODI debuts.

2 May
9:30 AM
Scorecard

Nepal; 150/5 (37.3 overs)	v	Malaysia; 149 (43.0 overs)
Mehboob Alam 53 (71); Suresh Navaratnam 3/33 (9 overs)		Anwar Arudin 34(25); Sompal Kami 5/47 (10 overs)

Nepal won by 5 wickets
Bayuemas Oval, Kuala Lumpur
Umpires: Vinay Kumar Jha and Viswanadan Kalidas
Player of the match: Sompal Kami (Nepal)

- Malaysia won the toss and chose to bat

2 May
9:30 AM
Scorecard

Oman; 143 (45.1 overs)	v	Hong Kong; 134 (41.1 overs)
Sultan Ahmed 37 (55); Irfan Ahmed 3/17 (7.1 overs)		Haseeb Amjad 38 (35); Ajay Lalcheta 4/22 (10 overs)

Oman won by 9 runs
Selangor Turf Club, Selangor
Umpires: Ramani Batumalai and Poobalan Loganathan
Player of the match: Ajay Lalcheta (Oman)

- Hong Kong won the toss and chose to field

4 May
9:30 AM
Scorecard

United Arab Emirates; 158/8 (48.3 overs)	v	Hong Kong*; 157 (45.2 overs)
Fayyaz Ahmed 37 (79); Tanwir Afzal 2/27 (9 overs)		Irfan Ahmed 30 (35); Mohammad Shahzad 4/26 (10 overs)

United Arab Emirates won by 2 wickets
Kinrara Academy Oval, Kuala Lumpur
Umpires: Buddhi Pradhan and Sarika Prasad
Player of the match: Mohammad Shahzad (United Arab Emirates)

- United Arab Emirates won the toss and chose to field
- Full ODI match.

4 May
9:30 AM
Scorecard

Malaysia; 176/7 (37.0 overs)	v	Afghanistan; 175 (46.0 overs)
Ahmed Faiz 44 (49); Shapoor Zadran 2/44 (7 overs)		Usman Ghani 36 (48); Khizar Hayat 4/29 (8 overs)

Malaysia won by 3 wickets
Bayuemas Oval, Kuala Lumpur
Umpires: Vinay Kumar Jha and Upul Kaluhetti
Player of the match: Khizar Hayat (Malaysia)

- Malaysia won the toss and chose to field

4 May
9:30 AM
Scorecard

Oman; 161/8 (47.5)	v	Nepal; 157 (45.0 overs)
Zeeshan Maqsood 44 (49); Shakti Gauchan 2/19 (10 overs)		Gyanendra Malla 26 (24); Aamir Kaleem 4/35 (10 overs)

Oman won by 2 wickets
Selangor Turf Club, Selangor
Umpires: Viswanadan Kalidas and Shafizan Shahriman
Player of the match: Aamir Kaleem (Oman)

- Oman won the toss and chose to field

5 May
9:30 AM
Scorecard

Malaysia; 158 (44.4 overs)	v	United Arab Emirates; 162/4 (25.4 overs)
Anwar Arudin 37(40); Fayyaz Ahmed 3/12 (4.4 overs)		Shaiman Anwar 53(33); Hassan Ghulam 2/31 (5.4 overs)

United Arab Emirates won by 6 wickets
Kinrara Academy Oval, Kuala Lumpur
Umpires: Vinay Kumar Jha and Upul Kaluhetti
Player of the match: Fayyaz Ahmed (United Arab Emirates)

- United Arab Emirates won the toss and chose to field

5 May
9:30 AM
Scorecard

Hong Kong; 181 (41.5 overs)	v	Nepal; 147/3 (34.1 overs)
Irfan Ahmed 106 (115); Sompal Kami 4/34 (7 overs)		Paras Khadka 43* (52); Irfan Ahmed 2/25 (8 overs)

Nepal won by 7 wickets (D/L method)
Bayuemas Oval, Kuala Lumpur
Umpires: Ramani Batumalai and Viswanadan Kalidas
Player of the match: Irfan Ahmed (Hong Kong)

- Nepal won the toss and chose to field
- Rain Delay - Target revised to 144 from 38 overs (D/L method)

5 May
9:30 AM
Scorecard

Oman; 186 (48.1 overs)	v	Afghanistan; 187/5 (34.0 overs)
Zeeshan Maqsood 43(61); Mohammad Nabi 3/26 (10 overs)		Noor Ali Zadran 67(83); Aamer Ali 1/4 (2 overs)

Afghanistan won by 5 wickets
Selangor Turf Club, Selangor
Umpires: Loganathan Poobalan and Narayanan Sivan
Player of the match: Samiullah Shenwari (Afghanistan)

- Afghanistan won the toss and chose to field

7 May
9:30 AM
Scorecard

Nepal; 128/9 (32.0 overs)	v	Afghanistan; 262 (49.3 overs)
Paras Khadka 33 (51); Dawlat Zadran 4/26 (7 overs)		Usman Ghani 51 (61); Shakti Gauchan 3/39 (10 overs)

Afghanistan won by 108 runs (D/L method)
Kinrara Academy Oval, Kuala Lumpur
Umpires: Sarika Prasad and Shafizan Shahriman
Player of the match: Dawlat Zadran (Afghanistan)

- Nepal won the toss and chose to field
- Rain Delay - Target revised to 237 from 32 overs (D/L method).

7 May
9:30 AM
Scorecard

Oman; 105 (38.0 overs)	v	United Arab Emirates; 162 (38.4 overs)
Vaibhav Wategaonkar 34 (64); Fayyaz Ahmed 3/14 (5 overs)		Mohammad Shahzad 50 (74); Munis Ansari 4/43 (9 overs)

United Arab Emirates won by 57 runs
Bayuemas Oval, Kuala Lumpur
Umpires: Loganathan Poobalan and Narayanan Sivan
Player of the match: Mohammad Shahzad (United Arab Emirates)

- Oman won the toss and chose to field

7 May
9:30 AM
Scorecard

Hong Kong; 186/6 (42.1 overs)	v	Malaysia; 184 (46.5)
Hammadullah Khan 38 (75); Nadeem Ahmed 3/28 (8.5 overs)		Babar Hayat 45 (76); Khizar Hayat 2/29 (10 overs)

Hong Kong won by 4 wickets
Selangor Turf Club, Selangor
Umpires: Vinay Kumar and Buddhi Pradhan
Player of the match: Waqas Barkat (Hong Kong)

- Hong Kong won the toss and chose to field

== Statistics ==
=== Most runs ===
The top five run scorers (total runs) are included in this table.

Player	Team	Runs	Inns	Avg	S/R	HS	100s	50s
Usman Ghani	Afghanistan	228	5	45.60	85.07	70	0	3
Amjad Ali	United Arab Emirates	207	5	41.40	83.46	98	0	1
Irfan Ahmed	Hong Kong	201	5	40.20	96.17	106	1	0
Noor Ali Zadran	Afghanistan	199	5	39.80	75.66	67	0	2
Samiullah Shenwari	Afghanistan	173	5	57.66	100.58	82*	0	1

=== Most wickets ===
The top five wicket takers (total wickets) are listed in this table.

Player	Team	Wkts	Mts	Ave	S/R	Econ	BBI
Sompal Kami	Nepal	15	5	15.13	17.2	5.25	5/47
Irfan Ahmed	Hong Kong	10	5	16.60	22.9	4.34	3/17
Aamir Kaleem	Oman	9	5	14.11	21.4	3.94	4/36
Dawlat Zadran	Afghanistan	9	4	15.44	18.4	5.02	4/26
Basanta Regmi	Nepal	9	5	20.11	30.8	3.90	3/42

== See also ==
- 2023 Men's Premier Cup
