= 2015–16 Stan Nagiah Trophy =

Singapore cricket team in Malaysia 2016
	Malaysia	Singapore
- Dates: February 19, 2016 – February 21, 2016
Captains	Ahmad Faiz	Chetan Suryawanshi

One Day International series

The Singapore cricket team toured Malaysia in February 2016. The tour consisted of two 50-over matches and one Twenty20 match of Stan Nagaiah Trophy which is a series of limited overs cricket matches played between Malaysia cricket team and Singapore cricket team.

== Squads ==
T20s
Malaysia	Singapore
Ahmad Faiz (C); Anwar Arudin (vc); Abdul Rashid; Ahmad Nasir; Ainool Hafizs; Ainool Haqqiem; Derek Duraisingam; Sivanantha Krishnan; Mohammad Nazril; Muhamad Makram; Muhammad Wafiq; Pavandeep Singh; Shafiq Sharif (wk); Shukri Rahim; Suharril Fetri; Muhammad Ramli; Virandeep Singh	Chetan Suryawanshi (c) (wk); Arjun Mutreja (vc); AAhan Achar; Abhinav Raman; Riaz Altaff Hussein; Mulewa Dharmichand; Janak Prakash; Vidyuth Kadiresan; Navin Param; Utsav Rakshit; Rohan Rangarajan; Kshitij Shinde; Karthik Suresh; Arun Vijayan

== Matches ==
=== 1st match ===
19 February
10:00
Scorecard

Malaysia; Malaysia 237/5 (45.4 overs)	v	Singapore; 235 all out (48.4 overs)
Virandeep Singh 61* (124); Dharmichand Mulewa 2/32 (9 overs)		Chetan Suryawanshi 67 (53); Suharril Fetri 2/30 (10 overs)

Malaysia won by 5 wickets
Kinrara Academy Oval, Kuala Lumpur
Umpires: Nasir Ali and Narayanan Sivan

- Malaysia won the toss chose to field

=== 2nd match ===
20 February
10:00
Scorecard

Malaysia; Malaysia 249/4 (40.5 overs)	v	Singapore; 248/9 (50 overs)
Ahmed Faiz 111* (94); Rohan Rangarajan 2/26 (7 overs)		Arjun Mutreja 57 (86); Suharril Fetri 3/32 (10 overs)

Malaysia won by 6 wickets
Kinrara Academy Oval, Kuala Lumpur
Umpires: Zaidan Taha and Narayanan Sivan
Player of the match: Ahmed Faiz

- Malaysia won the toss chose to field

=== 3rd Match ===
21 February
10:00
Scorecard

Malaysia; 219/4 (20 overs)	v	Singapore; 136/6 (20 overs)
Ahmed Faiz 109* (66); Janak Prakash 1/26 (4 overs)		Navin Param 44 (31); Derek Duraisingam 4/18 (4 overs)

Malaysia won by 83 runs
Kinrara Academy Oval, Kuala Lumpur
Umpires: Denish Sevakumaran and Batumalai Ramani

- Singapore won the toss chose to field
