= 2019 Cricket World Cup Challenge League A (Malaysia) =

Cricket tournament

2019 Malaysia Cricket World Cup Challenge League A
- Dates: 16 – 26 September 2019
- Administrator: International Cricket Council
- Cricket format: List A
- Tournament format: Round-robin
- Host: Malaysia Cricket Association
- Participants: 6
- Matches: 15
- Most runs: (Singapore) Tim David (369)
- Most wickets: (Singapore) Aryaman Sunil (14)

The 2019 Malaysia Cricket World Cup Challenge League A was the inaugural edition of Group A of the 2019–2022 Cricket World Cup Challenge League, a cricket tournament which formed part of the qualification pathway to the 2023 Cricket World Cup. In July 2019, the International Cricket Council (ICC) confirmed that the Malaysia Cricket Association would host the tournament. The series took place between 16 and 26 September 2019, with all the matches having List A status.

On the penultimate day of the tournament, Vanuatu were bowled out for 65 runs against Malaysia. In reply, Vanuatu managed to dismiss Malaysia for 52 runs, recording the lowest team total defended by any side in a List A cricket match.

Canada won the series, after finishing ahead of Singapore on net run rate, with both teams level on points.

== Squads ==
Canada	Denmark	Malaysia	Qatar	Singapore	Vanuatu
Navneet Dhaliwal (c); Shahid Ahmadzai; Nikhil Dutta; Romesh Eranga; Dillon Heyliger; Abraash Khan; Nitish Kumar; Cecil Pervez; Ravinderpal Singh; Hamza Tariq (wk); Harsh Thaker; Rodrigo Thomas; Srimantha Wijeratne (wk); Saad Bin Zafar	Hamid Shah (c); Lucky Ali; Taranjit Bharaj; Oliver Hald; Abdul Hashmi (wk); Jonas Henriksen; Jino Jojo; Delawar Khan; Zameer Khan; Frederik Klokker (wk); Nicolaj Laegsgaard; Rizwan Mahmood; Zishan Shah; Anique Uddin	Ahmad Faiz (c); Virandeep Singh (vc); Rashid Ahad; Syed Aziz; Suharril Fetri; Muhammad Hafiz; Dhivendran Mogan; Aminuddin Ramly; Anwar Rahman; Nazril Rahman; Shafiq Sharif (wk); Pavandeep Singh; Muhamad Syahadat; Norwira Zazmie	Iqbal Hussain (c); Mohammed Rizlan (vc, wk); Owais Ahmed; Saqlain Arshad; Zaheer Ibrahim; Kamran Khan; Qalandar Khan; Awais Malik; Gayan Munaweera; Mohammed Nadeem; Dharmang Patel; Musawar Shah; Khurram Shahzad; Syed Tameem	Amjad Mahboob (c); Aahan Gopinath Achar; Vinoth Baskaran; Surendran Chandramohan; Tim David; Avi Dixit; Rezza Gaznavi; Anantha Krishna; Arjun Mutreja; Navin Param; Rohan Rangarajan; Manpreet Singh (wk); Sidhant Singh; Aryaman Sunil	Andrew Mansale (c); Jelany Chilia; Shane Deitz (wk); Trevor Langa; Patrick Matautaava; Williamsing Nalisa; Nalin Nipiko; Simpson Obed; Joshua Rasu; Zechariah Shem; Apolinaire Stephen; Ronald Tari; Clement Tommy; Jamal Vira; Wesley Viraliliu

Prior to the series, Inam-ul-Haq and Tamoor Sajjad were ruled out of Qatar's squad due to reasons described as "personal" by organizers.

== Fixtures ==
16 September 2019
10:00
Scorecard

Malaysia; 192/7 (50 overs)	v	Denmark; 148 (42.2 overs)
Suharril Fetri 64* (114); Jino Jojo 3/38 (10 overs)		Hamid Shah 42 (59); Norwira Zazmie 4/24 (6.2 overs)

Malaysia won by 44 runs
Kinrara Academy Oval, Kuala Lumpur
Umpires: Vinod Babu (Oma) and Buddhi Pradhan (Nep)
Player of the match: Suharril Fetri (Mas)

- Denmark won the toss and elected to field.
- Syed Aziz, Muhammad Hafiz, Ahmad Faiz, Suharril Fetri, Anwar Rahman, Aminuddin Ramly, Shafiq Sharif, Pavandeep Singh, Virandeep Singh, Muhamad Syahadat, Norwira Zazmie (Mas), Oliver Hald, Abdul Hashmi, Jonas Henriksen, Jino Jojo, Zameer Khan, Nicolaj Laegsgaard, Hamid Shah and Anique Uddin (Den) all made their List A debuts.

17 September 2019
10:00
Scorecard

Qatar; 232/8 (50 overs)	v	Singapore; 213 (48.2 overs)
Zaheer Ibrahim 63 (92); Amjad Mahboob 3/42 (10 overs)		Tim David 75 (87); Gayan Munaweera 5/39 (9.2 overs)

Qatar won by 19 runs
Kinrara Academy Oval, Kuala Lumpur
Umpires: Akbar Ali (UAE) and Durga Subedi (Nep)
Player of the match: Iqbal Hussain (Qat)

- Qatar won the toss and elected to bat.
- Saqlain Arshad, Iqbal Hussain, Zaheer Ibrahim, Kamran Khan, Qalandar Khan, Awais Malik, Gayan Munaweera, Mohammed Nadeem, Mohammed Rizlan, Musawar Shah, Khurram Shahzad (Qat), Aahan Gopinath Achar, Vinoth Baskaran, Surendran Chandramohan, Tim David, Rezza Gaznavi, Anantha Krishna, Amjad Mahboob, Arjun Mutreja, Rohan Rangarajan, Manpreet Singh and Aryaman Sunil (Sin) all made their List A debuts.

17 September 2019
10:00
Scorecard

Vanuatu; 160 (47.1 overs)	v	Canada; 161/5 (32 overs)
Clement Tommy 42 (57); Nikhil Dutta 3/29 (9 overs)		Navneet Dhaliwal 72* (92); Patrick Matautaava 2/23 (7 overs)

Canada won by 5 wickets
Selangor Turf Club, Selangor
Umpires: Viswanadan Kalidas (Mas) and Sarika Prasad (Sin)
Player of the match: Navneet Dhaliwal (Can)

- Canada won the toss and elected to field.
- Jelany Chilia, Andrew Mansale, Patrick Matautaava, Williamsing Nalisa, Nalin Nipiko, Simpson Obed, Joshua Rasu, Apolinaire Stephen, Ronald Tari and Clement Tommy (Van) all made their List A debuts.

19 September 2019
10:00
Scorecard

Canada; 408/7 (50 overs)	v	Malaysia; 202 (46.3 overs)
Navneet Dhaliwal 140 (94); Suharril Fetri 3/82 (9 overs)		Ahmad Faiz 41 (55); Nitish Kumar 3/35 (10 overs)

Canada won by 206 runs
Kinrara Academy Oval, Kuala Lumpur
Umpires: Sarika Prasad (Sin) and Durga Subedi (Nep)
Player of the match: Navneet Dhaliwal (Can)

- Malaysia won the toss and elected to field.
- Dhivendran Mogan (Mas) made his List A debut.

19 September 2019
10:00
Scorecard

Singapore; 249/7 (50 overs)	v	Denmark; 213 (50 overs)
Tim David 97 (75); Delawar Khan 3/49 (9 overs)		Anique Uddin 43 (67); Aryaman Sunil 6/46 (9 overs)

Singapore won by 36 runs
Selangor Turf Club, Selangor
Umpires: Akbar Ali (UAE) and Vinod Babu (Oma)
Player of the match: Tim David (Sin)

- Singapore won the toss and elected to bat.
- Delawar Khan (Den), Navin Param and Sidhant Singh (Sin) all made their List A debuts.

20 September 2019
10:00
Scorecard

Denmark; 220/7 (50 overs)	v	Vanuatu; 72 (25.3 overs)
Frederik Klokker 74* (81); Patrick Matautaava 3/35 (10 overs)		Shane Deitz 29* (50); Jino Jojo 4/29 (10 overs)

Denmark won by 148 runs
Kinrara Academy Oval, Kuala Lumpur
Umpires: Akbar Ali (UAE) and Viswanadan Kalidas (Mas)
Player of the match: Frederik Klokker (Den)

- Denmark won the toss and elected to bat.

20 September 2019
10:00
Scorecard

Malaysia; 153/7 (50 overs)	v	Qatar; 154/7 (47.4 overs)
Nazril Rahman 52* (57); Khurram Shahzad 2/16 (10 overs)		Mohammed Rizlan 44* (98); Pavandeep Singh 2/14 (10 overs)

Qatar won by 3 wickets
Selangor Turf Club, Selangor
Umpires: Vinod Babu (Oma) and Durga Subedi (Nep)
Player of the match: Mohammed Rizlan (Qat)

- Malaysia won the toss and elected to bat.
- Nazril Rahman (Mas) and Dharmang Patel (Qat) both made their List A debuts.

22 September 2019
10:00
Scorecard

Canada; 379/4 (50 overs)	v	Qatar; 264 (48.5 overs)
Nitish Kumar 129 (84); Iqbal Hussain 3/88 (10 overs)		Saqlain Arshad 97 (88); Nitish Kumar 5/72 (9 overs)

Canada won by 115 runs
Kinrara Academy Oval, Kuala Lumpur
Umpires: Viswanadan Kalidas (Mas) and Sarika Prasad (Sin)
Player of the match: Nitish Kumar (Can)

- Canada won the toss and elected to bat.

22 September 2019
10:00
Scorecard

Singapore; 217/7 (50 overs)	v	Vanuatu; 175 (46.2 overs)
Tim David 63 (72); Simpson Obed 2/25 (7 overs)		Nalin Nipiko 77 (96); Aryaman Sunil 4/45 (8 overs)

Singapore won by 42 runs
Selangor Turf Club, Selangor
Umpires: Vinod Babu (Oma) and Buddhi Pradhan (Nep)
Player of the match: Aryaman Sunil (Sin)

- Vanuatu won the toss and elected to field.
- Zechariah Shem and Jamal Vira (Van) both made their List A debuts.

23 September 2019
10:00
Scorecard

Malaysia; 201 (48.1 overs)	v	Singapore; 205/6 (45.1 overs)
Virandeep Singh 73 (115); Vinoth Baskaran 3/32 (10 overs)		Tim David 95* (81); Suharril Fetri 3/43 (8 overs)

Singapore won by 4 wickets
Kinrara Academy Oval, Kuala Lumpur
Umpires: Buddhi Pradhan (Nep) and Durga Subedi (Nep)
Player of the match: Tim David (Sin)

- Malaysia won the toss and elected to bat.

23 September 2019
10:00
Scorecard

Denmark; 258/8 (50 overs)	v	Qatar; 198 (43.4 overs)
Hamid Shah 93 (130); Zaheer Ibrahim 2/30 (7 overs)		Mohammed Rizlan 63 (98); Hamid Shah 3/37 (8 overs)

Denmark won by 60 runs
Selangor Turf Club, Selangor
Umpires: Akbar Ali (UAE) and Sarika Prasad (Sin)
Player of the match: Hamid Shah (Den)

- Denmark won the toss and elected to bat.
- Lucky Ali (Den) and Owais Ahmed (Qat) both made their List A debuts.

25 September 2019
10:00
Scorecard

Canada; 302/8 (50 overs)	v	Denmark; 172/9 (33 overs)
Srimantha Wijeratne 84 (80); Oliver Hald 2/60 (10 overs)		Zameer Khan 60 (72); Saad Bin Zafar 3/28 (7 overs)

Canada won by 48 runs (DLS method)
Kinrara Academy Oval, Kuala Lumpur
Umpires: Akbar Ali (UAE) and Viswanadan Kalidas (Mas)
Player of the match: Saad Bin Zafar (Can)

- Canada won the toss and elected to bat.
- Denmark were set a revised target of 221 runs from 33 overs due to rain.
- Abraash Khan (Can) made his List A debut.

25 September 2019
10:00
Scorecard

Vanuatu; 65 (25.1 overs)	v	Malaysia; 52 (21.4 overs)
Nalin Nipiko 12 (23); Nazril Rahman 4/14 (6 overs)		Aminuddin Ramly 25 (35); Patrick Matautaava 5/19 (10 overs)

Vanuatu won by 13 runs
Selangor Turf Club, Selangor
Umpires: Buddhi Pradhan (Nep) and Sarika Prasad (Sin)
Player of the match: Patrick Matautaava (Van)

- Vanuatu won the toss and elected to bat.
- Rashid Ahad (Mas) made his List A debut.

26 September 2019
10:00
Scorecard

Qatar; 185 (49.1 overs)	v	Vanuatu; 171/9 (44 overs)
Iqbal Hussain 39 (36); Apolinaire Stephen 3/32 (10 overs)		Shane Deitz 50 (80); Gayan Munaweera 4/52 (9 overs)

Qatar won by 5 runs (DLS method)
Kinrara Academy Oval, Kuala Lumpur
Umpires: Vinod Babu (Oma) and Durga Subedi (Nep)
Player of the match: Gayan Munaweera (Qat)

- Qatar won the toss and elected to bat.
- Vanuatu were set a revised target of 177 runs from 44 overs due to rain.

26 September 2019
10:00
Scorecard

Singapore; 245 (48.4 overs)	v	Canada; 191 (34 overs)
Arjun Mutreja 72 (117); Abraash Khan 5/62 (9.1 overs)		Nikhil Dutta 33 (41); Tim David 3/26 (7 overs)

Singapore won by 4 runs (DLS method)
Selangor Turf Club, Selangor
Umpires: Viswanadan Kalidas (Mas) and Buddhi Pradhan (Nep)

- Canada won the toss and elected to field.
- Canada were set a revised target of 196 runs from 34 overs due to rain.
