= Cricket in Vietnam =

Cricket in Vietnam was first played in the mid–20th Century; however, it was formalised with the formation of the Hanoi Cricket Club in 1993. Cricket is largely played in Vietnam by English expatriates, who maintain cricket's social facets in a largely football (soccer) playing country, as the Vietnam Sports Industry has no official organisation for cricket. Nevertheless, it remains "excited by the idea of promoting cricket" and is advocating the formation of a cricket association, particularly in Ho Chi Minh City and Hanoi.

In Vietnam, a three-team 30 over Trophy is played annually, and the cricket seasons runs from September to December. From March to May, 40 local cricket clubs also play a season of cricket. The use of rattan matting as a batting wicket meant that run ups in Vietnam are only a few yards long, and this policy was implemented two overs into the first international match between the Hanoi Cricket Club and an England/Australia touring party in 1993. In 2000, a Hanoi player, BT Duong, hit the club's first ever century, the second in the entire nation's history, and the first overseas players began to play. Matches, however, remain oft affected by the weather.

In 2006 the Saigon Cricket Association (SCA) was formed with six, mainly nationality based, teams playing in a 25 over, Sunday Tournament at the Royal Melbourne Institute of Technology (RMIT) sports ground in Ho Chi Minh City. Expat teams from Australia, England, Sri Lanka, 2 x India and a mixed nation side from RMIT all played in the inaugural year, with the Saigon Australian Cricket Club winning the tournament.

The SCA was renamed the Vietnam Cricket Association (VCA) in 2009, to commence the formal applications for incorporation and to request membership to the Asian Cricket Council. The VCA organises an international sixes tournament in February and/or March of each year.

The Vietnam national cricket team shall debut in the Cricket at the 2017 Southeast Asian Games event.
