= 2014 ICC World Cricket League Division Three =

- Dates: 23 October – 30 October 2014
- Administrator: International Cricket Council
- Cricket format: Limited overs cricket
- Tournament format(s): Round-robin and playoffs
- Host: Malaysia
- Champions: Nepal (2nd title)
- Participants: 6
- Matches: 20
- Player of the series: (Uganda) Roger Mukasa
- Most runs: (Singapore) Arjun Mutreja (282)
- Most wickets: (Nepal) Basanta Regmi (14)

The 2014 ICC World Cricket League Division Three was a cricket divisional tournament organised by the International Cricket Council. It formed part of the ICC World Cricket League (WCL) and qualification for the 2019 World Cup. The top two teams in the tournament, Nepal and Uganda, qualified for the 2015 WCL Division Two tournament, to be held in Namibia, while the bottom two teams, United States and Bermuda, were relegated to the 2016 WCL Division Four tournament.

Malaysia hosted the event, from 23 to 30 October 2014. It was originally scheduled to be held in Uganda, but in September 2014 the ICC shifted the tournament to Malaysia due to security concerns, at the suggestion of the Malaysian Cricket Association. Players from Bermuda and the United States had indicated they would not take part in the tournament if it was held in Uganda.

== Teams ==
The teams that took part in the tournament were decided according to the results of the 2014 World Cup Qualifier, the 2013 WCL Division Three, and the 2014 WCL Division Four.

Key
†	Denotes relegated teams
†	Denotes unmoved teams
†	Denotes promoted teams

Team	Last outcome
Nepal	9th in 2014 World Cup Qualifier, New Zealand
Uganda	10th in 2014 World Cup Qualifier, New Zealand
United States	3rd in 2013 ICC World Cricket League Division Three, Bermuda
Bermuda	4th in 2013 ICC World Cricket League Division Three, Bermuda
Malaysia	1st in 2014 ICC World Cricket League Division Four, Singapore
Singapore	2nd in 2014 ICC World Cricket League Division Four, Singapore

== Venues ==
Following three venues were used for the tournament.

- Kinrara Academy Oval, Kuala Lumpur
- Bayuemas Oval, Kuala Lumpur
- Selangor Turf Club, Selangor

== Squads ==
Bermuda	Malaysia	Nepal	Singapore	Uganda	United States
Janeiro Tucker (c); Onais Bascome; Kamal Bashir; Christian Burgess; Lionel Cann; Jordan DeSilva; Allan Douglas; Terryn Fray; Malachi Jones; Kamau Leverock; Tre Manders; Delray Rawlins; Dion Stovell; Delano Talbot	Ahmed Faiz (c); Anwar Arudin; Derek Duraisingam; Hassan Ghulam; Khizar Hayat; Nasir Shafiq; Suresh Navaratnam; Pavandeep Singh; Aminuddin Ramly; Shafiq Sharif (wk); Shahrulnizam Yusof; Shukri Rahim; Suhan Alagaratnam; Suharril Fetri	Paras Khadka (c); Gyanendra Malla (vc); Mehboob Alam; Binod Bhandari (wk); Amrit Bhattarai; Naresh Budhayer; Shakti Gauchan; Sompal Kami; Bhuwan Karki; Subash Khakurel (wk); Sagar Pun; Basanta Regmi; Aarif Sheikh; Sharad Vesawkar	Saad Janjua (c); Abhiraj Singh; Amjad Mahboob; Suresh Appusamy; Mulewa Dharmichand; Rezza Gaznavi; Christopher Janik; Chaminda Ruwan; Mohamed Shoib; Arjun Mutreja; Anish Paraam; Kshitij Shinde; Chetan Suryawanshi; Selladore Vijayakumar	Frank Nsubuga (c); Davis Arinaitwe; Hamu Bagenda; Arthur Kyobe; Brian Masaba; Deusdedit Muhumuza; Roger Mukasa; Naeem Bardai; Danniel Ruyange; Lawrence Sematimba; Jonathan Ssebanja; Henry Ssenyondo; Irishard Suleiman; Phillimon Selowa	Steve Massiah (c); Adil Bhatti; Danial Ahmed; Fahad Babar; Karan Ganesh; Elmore Hutchinson; Jermaine Lawson; Muhammad Ghous; Sushil Nadkarni; Timil Patel; Srini Santhanam; Steven Taylor (wk); Aditya Thyagarajan; Usman Shuja

== Fixtures ==
All times are Malaysia Standard Time (UTC+08:00)

=== Round robin ===
==== Points table ====
Pos	Team	Pld	W	L	T	NR	Pts	NRR	Promotion or relegation
1	Nepal	5	4	1	0	0	8	1.985	Met in the final and promoted to Division Two for 2015
2	Uganda	5	4	1	0	0	8	0.152	Met in the final and promoted to Division Two for 2015
3	Singapore	5	3	2	0	0	6	−0.351	Met in the 3rd place playoff and remained in Division Three for 2017
4	Malaysia	5	2	3	0	0	4	0.204	Met in the 3rd place playoff and remained in Division Three for 2017
5	United States	5	1	4	0	0	2	0.165	Met in the 5th place playoff and relegated to Division Four for 2016
6	Bermuda	5	1	4	0	0	2	−2.134	Met in the 5th place playoff and relegated to Division Four for 2016

==== Matches ====
23 October
10:15
Scorecard

Uganda; 203/8 (50.0 overs)	v	Nepal; 183 (48.5 overs)
Phillimon Selowa 84 (102); Paras Khadka 3/34 (10.0 overs)		Naresh Budhayer 62 (122); Davis Arinaitwe 4/33 (10.0 overs)

Uganda won by 20 runs
Kinrara Academy Oval, Kuala Lumpur
Umpires: Johan Cloete (RSA) and Wynand Louw (Namibia)
Player of the match: Phillimon Selowa (Uganda)

- Nepal won the toss and chose to bat

23 October
10:15
Scorecard

Bermuda; 106 (26.5 overs)	v	United States; 107/4 (21.5 overs)
Allan Douglas 36 (35); Usman Shuja 3/12 (6.0 overs)		Steve Massiah 31 (27); Delray Rawlins 2/40 (7.5 overs)

United States of America won by 6 wickets
Bayuemas Oval, Kuala Lumpur
Umpires: Kathy Cross (NZ) and Sri Ganesh (Singapore)
Player of the match: Usman Shuja (United States of America)

- United States won the toss and chose to field

23 October
10:15
Scorecard

Malaysia; 198 (47.3 overs)	v	Singapore; 199/8 (48.5 overs)
Ahmed Faiz 57 (88); Mulewa Dharmichand 3/27 (9.3 overs)		Arjun Mutreja 73 (115); Hassan Ghulam 4/15 (8.2 overs)

Singapore won by 2 wickets
Selangor Turf Club, Selangor
Umpires: Rockie D'Mello (Kenya) and Courtney Young (Cayman Islands)
Player of the match: Arjun Mutreja (Singapore)

- Singapore won the toss and chose to field

24 October
10:15
Scorecard

Uganda; 196 (50.0 overs)	v	Singapore; 195/9 (50.0 overs)
Roger Mukasa 37 (44); Saad Janjua 4/25 (6.0 overs)		Chetan Suryawanshi 42 (72); Roger Mukasa 2/32 (10.0 overs)

Uganda won by 1 run
Kinrara Academy Oval, Kuala Lumpur
Umpires: Kathy Cross (New Zealand) and Courtney Young (Cayman Islands)
Player of the match: Roger Mukasa (Uganda)

- Uganda won the toss and chose to bat

24 October
10:15
Scorecard

United States; 186/8 (50.0 overs)	v	Malaysia; 189/5 (48.2 overs)
Adil Bhatti 42 (21); Shahrulnizam Yusof 2/19 (10.0 overs)		Shafiq Sharif 59 (70); Karan Ganesh 2/26 (10.0 overs)

Malaysia won by 5 wickets
Bayuemas Oval, Kuala Lumpur
Umpires: Johan Cloete (South Africa) and Durga Subedi (Nepal)
Player of the match: Shafiq Sharif (Malaysia)

- Malaysia won the toss and chose to field

24 October
10:15
Scorecard

Bermuda; 100 (40.1 overs)	v	Nepal; 101/2 (11.1 overs)
Christian Burgess 28 (40); Shakti Gauchan 2/7 (7.0 overs)		Binod Bhandari 43* (31); Janeiro Tucker 2/11 (2.0 overs)

Nepal won by 8 wickets
Selangor Turf Club, Selangor
Umpires: Wynand Louw (Namibia) and Sri Ganesh (Singapore)
Player of the match: Binod Bhandari (Nepal)

- Nepal won the toss and chose to field

26 October
10:15
Scorecard

Bermuda; 257/8 (50.0 overs)	v	Malaysia; 179/7 (43.0 overs)
Christian Burgess 82 (88); Suharril Fetri 2/41 (10.0 overs)		Ahmed Faiz 87 (111); Dion Stovell 3/29 (9.0 overs)

Bermuda won by 37 runs (D/L method)
Kinrara Academy Oval, Kuala Lumpur
Umpires: Rockie D'Mello (Kenya) and Durga Subedi (Nepal)
Player of the match: Christian Burgess (Bermuda)

- Malaysiya won the toss and chose to field
- Rain interrupted the match in the 2nd innings.

26 October
10:15
Scorecard

Nepal; 263/9 (50.0 overs)	v	Singapore; 73 (21.4 overs)
Gyanendra Malla 114 (125); Amjad Mahboob 4/47 (9.0 overs)		Chetan Suryawanshi 15(16); Basanta Regmi 4/6 (5.4 overs)

Nepal won by 190 runs
Bayuemas Oval, Kuala Lumpur
Umpires: Wynand Louw (NAM) and Courtney Young (CI)
Player of the match: Gyanendra Malla (Nepal)

- Singapore won the toss and chose to field

26 October
10:15
Scorecard

Uganda; 215/8 (50.0 overs)	v	United States; 128/6 (35.4 overs)
Roger Mukasa 71(100); Timil Patel 3/42 (10.0 overs)		Srini Santhanam 37 (73); Frank Nsubuga 4/14 (7.0 overs)

Uganda won by 24 runs (D/L method)
Selangor Turf Club, Selangor
Umpires: Johan Cleote (South Africa) and Sri Ganesh (Singapore)
Player of the match: Roger Mukasa (Uganda)

- Uganda won the toss and chose to bat
- Rain interrupted the match in the 2nd innings.

27 October
10:15
Scorecard

United States; 204 (47.3 overs)	v	Nepal
Steve Massiah 74 (60); Sompal Kami 3/37(9.0 overs)

No result
Kinrara Academy Oval, Kuala Lumpur
Umpires: Rockie D'Mello (Kenya) and Sri Ganesh (Singapore)

- United States won the toss and chose to bat
- Rain interrupted the match after 1st innings and target was revised for Nepal to 162 runs from 30 overs. With further rain, match was called off and rescheduled for 28 October.

27 October
10:15
Scorecard

Uganda; 106 (39.0 overs)	v	Malaysia; 107/6 (21.0 overs)
Phillimon Selowa 24 (34); Derek Duraisingam 3/23 (8.0 overs)		Ahmed Faiz 34*(43); Davis Arinaitwe 5/32 (8.0 overs)

Malaysia won by 4 wickets
Bayuemas Oval, Kuala Lumpur
Umpires: Durga Subedi (Nepal) and Courtney Young (Cayman Islands)
Player of the match: Derek Duraisingam (Malaysia)

- Uganda won the toss and chose to bat

27 October
10:15
Scorecard

Singapore; 266/8 (50.0 overs)	v	Bermuda
Arjun Mutreja 108 (137); Dion Stovell 4/53 (9 overs)

No result
Selangor Turf Club, Selangor
Umpires: Johan Cloete (South Africa) and Kathy Cross (New Zealand)

- Singapore won the toss and chose to bat
- Match called off, new game scheduled for 28 October

28 October
09:30
Scorecard

United States; 223/9 (50.0 overs)	v	Nepal; 73/1 (22.0 overs)
Fahad Babar 59 (114); Shakti Gauchan 3/30 (10.0 overs)		Subash Khakurel 49* (82); Usman Shuja 1/11 (5.0 overs)

Nepal won by 10 runs (D/L method)
Kinrara Academy Oval, Kuala Lumpur
Umpires: Rockie D'Mello (Kenya) and Sri Ganesh (Singapore)
Player of the match: Subash Khakurel (Nepal)

- United States won the toss and chose to bat
- Rain stopped the Nepal's innings after 22 overs. D/L method was used to decide the result.
- Replay of match scheduled 27 October

28 October
09:30
Scorecard

Singapore; 127/7 (31.3 overs)	v	Bermuda; 124 (27.5 overs)
Kamau Leverock 28(38); Selladore Vijayakumar 4/38 (8.5 overs)		Chaminda Ruwan 57(65); Kamau Leverock 3/16 (5.0 overs)

Singapore won by 3 wickets
Selangor Turf Club, Selangor
Umpires: Johan Cloete (South Africa) and Kathy Cross (New Zealand)
Player of the match: Selladore Vijayakumar (Singapore)

- Bermuda won the toss and chose to bat
- Replay of match scheduled 27 October

29 October
10:15
Scorecard

Singapore; 225/7 (50.0 overs)	v	United States; 167 (39.4 overs)
Anish Paraam 72 (73); Elmore Hutchinson 2/26 (7.0 overs)		Steven Taylor 56 (66); Selladore Vijayakumar 3/43 (9.0 overs)

Singapore won by 32 runs (D/L method)
Kinrara Academy Oval, Kuala Lumpur
Umpires: Wynand Louw (Namibia) and Durga Subedi (Nepal)
Player of the match: Anish Paraam (Singapore)

- Singapore won the toss and chose to bat
- Rain Delay - Target revised to 200 from 42 overs (D/L method)

29 October
10:15
Scorecard

Bermuda; 140 (39.5 overs)	v	Uganda; 142/3 (24.5 overs)
Roger Mukasa 86 (68); Dion Stovell 2/30 (6.5 overs)		Kamau Leverock 27 (25); Frank Nsubuga 3/26 (10.0 overs)

Uganda won by 7 wickets
Bayuemas Oval, Kuala Lumpur
Umpires: Johan Cloete (SA) & Rockie D'Mello (Ken)
Player of the match: Roger Mukasa (UGA)

- Bermuda won the toss and chose to bat

29 October
10:15
Scorecard

Malaysia; 142 (43.3 overs)	v	Nepal; 89/2 (25.0 overs)
Anwar Arudin 69 (102); Paras Khadka 4/20 (9.0 overs)		Naresh Budhayer 42* (77); Khizar Hayat 1/2 (2.0 overs)

Nepal won by 36 runs (D/L method)
Selangor Turf Club, Selangor
Umpires: Kathy Cross (New Zealand) and Sri Ganesh (Singapore)
Player of the match: Paras Khadka (Nepal)

- Nepal won the toss and chose to field
- Rain stopped the Nepal's innings after 25 overs. D/L method was used to decide the result.

=== Playoffs ===
==== 5th place playoff ====
30 October
10:15
Scorecard

Bermuda; 113 (19.3 overs)	v	United States; 118/0 (15.2 overs)
Jordan DeSilva 39 (37); Adil Bhatti 3/29 (5.0 overs)		Fahad Babar 63* (49)

USA won by 10 wickets
Selangor Turf Club, Selangor
Umpires: R D'Mello (Kenya) and Sri Ganesh (Singapore)
Player of the match: Adil Bhatti (USA)

- Bermuda won the toss and chose to bat

==== 3rd place playoff ====
30 October
09:30
Scorecard

Singapore; 169 (48.0 overs)	v	Malaysia; 172/3 (32.3 overs)
Christopher Janik 63 (103); Pavandeep Singh 3/43 (9.0 overs)		Suhan Alagaratnam 101 (96); Arjun Mutreja 1/5 (0.3 overs)

Malaysia won by 7 wickets
Bayuemas Oval, Kuala Lumpur
Umpires: Wynand Louw (Namibia) and Durga Subedi (Nepal)
Player of the match: Suhan Alagaratnam (Mas)

- Malaysia won the toss and chose to field

==== Final ====
30 October
09:30
Scorecard

Nepal; 223 (49.5 overs)	v	Uganda; 161 (44.1 overs)
Sagar Pun 64 (99); Roger Mukasa 6/27 (3.5 overs)		Roger Mukasa 51 (52); Bhuwan Karki 4/39 (8.0 overs)

Nepal won by 62 runs
Kinrara Academy Oval, Kuala Lumpur
Umpires: Kathy Cross (New Zealand) and Courtney Young (CI)
Player of the match: Roger Mukasa (Uga)

- Nepal won the toss and chose to bat

== Statistics ==
=== Most runs ===
Player	Team	Runs	Inns	Avg	S/R	HS	100s	50s
Arjun Mutreja	Singapore	282	7	40.28	64.09	108	1	1
Roger Mukasa	Uganda	265	6	44.16	89.52	86	0	3
Ahmed Faiz	Malaysia	261	6	52.20	70.92	87	0	2
Fahad Babar	United States	247	6	49.40	65.51	63*	0	2
Gyanendra Malla	Nepal	241	6	48.20	72.59	114	1	1

Source: Cricinfo

=== Most wickets ===
Player	Team	Wkts	Mts	Ave	S/R	Econ	BBI
Basanta Regmi	Nepal	14	7	14.85	26.9	3.31	4/6
Roger Mukasa	Uganda	13	6	9.61	12.8	4.49	6/27
Davis Arinaitwe	Uganda	13	6	16.00	25.3	3.79	5/32
Frank Nsubuga	Uganda	11	6	16.81	27.6	3.65	4/23
Dion Stovell	Bermuda	11	7	17.00	21.7	4.69	4/53

Source: Cricinfo

== Final placings ==
After the conclusion of the tournament the teams were distributed as follows:

Pos	Team	Status
1st	Nepal	Promoted to Division Two for 2015
2nd	Uganda	Promoted to Division Two for 2015
3rd	Malaysia	Remained in Division Three for 2017
4th	Singapore	Remained in Division Three for 2017
5th	United States	Relegated to Division Four for 2016
6th	Bermuda	Relegated to Division Four for 2016
