= Phillimon Selowa =

Ugandan cricketer (born 1986)

Personal information
- Full name: Phillimon Mpho Selowa
- Born: 3 August 1986 (age 40)
- Batting: Right-handed

International information
- National side: Uganda
- Source: Cricinfo, 24 October 2014

Phillimon Selowa also known as Phillimon Mpho Selowa Mukobe (born 3 August 1986) is a South African- born Ugandan cricketer who played for the Uganda national cricket team in the 2014 ICC World Cricket League Division Three tournament scored the highest score of 24 runs.

== Early life and education ==
Phillimon Mpho Selowa was born on 3 August 1986 in Pretoria, Transvaal, South Africa.

== Career ==
Selowa grew as a youth cricketer in South Africa playing as a left-handed batsman and wicket-keeper. He represented South Africa Under-17 team and playing in South African development structures, including teams such as Northerns, North West, KwaZulu-Natal, South Western Districts and University Sports South Africa XI.

He joined the Uganda national cricket team in 2013 and played for it in the 2014 ICC World Cricket League Division Three tournament where he scored the highest score of 24 runs. In more than fifty first-class and List A matches in South Africa from 2006 to 2015. He announced his retirement from the national team immediately after Cricket Cranes lost its game to Netherlands during the Pepsi Division II International Cricket Council World Cricket League tournament in Windhoek, Namibia.

== See also ==
- Alpesh Ramjani
- Sumeet Verma
