= Clement Tommy =

Vanuatuan cricketer (born 1997)

Personal information
- Born: 27 June 1997 (age 29)
- Batting: Right handed

International information
- National side: Vanuatu
- T20I debut (cap 13): 24 March 2019 v Philippines
- Last T20I: 17 May 2026 v Papua New Guinea
Medal record
Representing Vanuatu
Men's Cricket
Pacific Games
Silver medal – second place	2019 Apia	Twenty20 International
- Source: ESPNcricinfo, 10 September 2025

Clement Tommy (born 27 June 1997) is a Vanuatuan cricketer. He played in the 2016 ICC World Cricket League Division Five tournament. He was in Vanuatu's squad for Group A of the 2018–19 ICC World Twenty20 East Asia-Pacific Qualifier tournament. In March 2019, he was named in the Vanuatuan squad for the Regional Finals of the 2018–19 ICC World Twenty20 East Asia-Pacific Qualifier tournament. He made his Twenty20 International (T20I) debut against the Philippines on 24 March 2019.

He was part of the Vanuatu cricket team in the men's tournament at the 2019 Pacific Games. In September 2019, he was named in Vanuatu's squad for the 2019 Malaysia Cricket World Cup Challenge League A tournament. He made his List A debut for Vanuatu, against Canada, in the Cricket World Cup Challenge League A tournament on 17 September 2019.
