= Gayan Munaweera =

Qatari cricketer (born 1991)

Personal information
- Full name: Gayan Buddika Wijeweera Munaweera
- Born: 18 October 1991 (age 35); Kandy, Sri Lanka
- Role: Bowler

International information
- National side: Qatar
- T20I debut (cap 12): 4 July 2019 v Kuwait
- Last T20I: 23 December 2022 v Singapore
- Source: Cricinfo, 25 December 2022

Gayan Munaweera (born 18 October 1991) is a cricketer who plays for the Qatar national cricket team. He made his Twenty20 International (T20I) debut for Qatar against Kuwait on 4 July 2019. On 27 July 2019, he played in Qatar's final match of the Regional Finals of the 2018–19 ICC T20 World Cup Asia Qualifier tournament, against Malaysia. In September 2019, he was named in Qatar's squad for the 2019 Malaysia Cricket World Cup Challenge League A tournament. He made his List A debut for Qatar, against Singapore, in the Cricket World Cup Challenge League A tournament on 17 September 2019. In October 2021, he was named in Qatar's squad for the Group A matches in the 2021 ICC Men's T20 World Cup Asia Qualifier.
