= Abraash Khan =

Canadian cricketer (born 1998)

Dr. Abraash Khan
Personal information
- Full name: Muhammad Abraash Khan
- Born: 23 July 1998 (age 28); Peshawar, Pakistan

International information
- National side: Canada
- T20I debut (cap 49): 19 August 2019 v Bermuda
- Last T20I: 25 October 2019 v Oman
- Source: Cricinfo, 25 October 2019

Dr. Abraash Khan (born 23 July 1998) is a Canadian cricketer. In August 2019, he was named in Canada's squad for the Regional Finals of the 2018–19 ICC T20 World Cup Americas Qualifier tournament. He made his Twenty20 International (T20I) debut for Canada against Bermuda on 19 August 2019. Prior to his T20I debut, he was named in Canada's squad for the 2016 Under-19 Cricket World Cup.

In September 2019, he was named in Canada's squad for the 2019 Malaysia Cricket World Cup Challenge League A tournament. He made his List A debut for Canada, against Denmark, in the Cricket World Cup Challenge League A tournament on 25 September 2019. In October 2019, he was named in Canada's squad for the 2019 ICC T20 World Cup Qualifier tournament in the United Arab Emirates. In 2023, he graduated from the University of Birmingham Medical School.
