= Irfan Sajid =

Emirati cricketer (born 1983)

Personal information
- Born: 1 January 1983 (age 43); Pakistan
- Batting: Right-handed
- Bowling: Legbreak

International information
- National side: United Arab Emirates
- Only ODI (cap 49): 2 May 2014 v Afghanistan
- Source: ESPNcricinfo, 28 November 2014

Irfan Sajid (born 1 January 1983) is a Pakistani-born cricketer who played for the United Arab Emirates national cricket team. He made his One Day International debut for the United Arab Emirates against Afghanistan in the 2014 ACC Premier League on 2 May 2014.
