= Apolinaire Stephen =

Vanuatuan cricketer (born 1995)

Personal information
- Born: 22 June 1995 (age 31)
- Batting: Right handed
- Bowling: Right-arm Medium

International information
- National side: Vanuatu
- T20I debut (cap 16): 2 October 2019 v Malaysia
- Last T20I: 24 August 2024 v Samoa
- Source: Cricinfo, 10 September 2025

Apolinaire Liplip Stephen (born 22 June 1995) is a Vanuatuan cricketer.

== Biography ==
He played in the 2015 ICC World Cricket League Division Six tournament. In March 2018, he was named in Vanuatu's squad for the 2018 ICC World Cricket League Division Four tournament in Malaysia. In August 2018, he was named in Vanuatu's squad for Group A of the 2018–19 ICC World Twenty20 East Asia-Pacific Qualifier tournament.

He was part of Vanuatu's squad for the 2019 Malaysia Cricket World Cup Challenge League A tournament. He made his List A debut, against Canada, in the Cricket World Cup Challenge League A tournament on 17 September 2019. In the same month he was named in Vanuatu's Twenty20 International (T20I) squad for their series against Malaysia. He made his T20I debut against Malaysia, on 2 October 2019.
