= ACC Championship =

- Administrator: Asian Cricket Council
- Cricket format: First-class cricket
- Host: United Arab Emirates
- Participants: 4
- Official website: www.asiancricket.org/index.php/tournaments/acc-championship-2014

The ACC Championship was a cancelled two-day cricket tournament run by the Asian Cricket Council that is contested between its members nations.

The first tournament was scheduled to be held in December 2014. It was canceled due to the busy preparation schedules of Afghanistan and UAE for the 2015 ICC Cricket World Cup.

== 2014 ACC Championship ==
The 2014 ACC Championship was scheduled to be the first tournament of the ACC Championship, to be held in the United Arab Emirates on 7–14 December 2014. The top four teams from the 2014 ACC Premier League, Afghanistan, UAE, Nepal and Oman had qualified for the championship.

Due to the busy preparation schedules of Afghanistan and UAE for 2015 ICC Cricket World Cup, the tournament was cancelled.
