= Dharmang Patel =

Qatari cricketer (born 1991)

Personal information
- Born: 16 September 1991 (age 35)

International information
- National side: Qatar
- T20I debut (cap 23): 15 December 2022 v Singapore
- Last T20I: 22 December 2022 v Bahrain
- Source: Cricinfo, 25 December 2022

Dharmang Patel (born 16 September 1991) is a cricketer who plays for the Qatar national cricket team. He was named in Qatar's squad for the 2017 ICC World Cricket League Division Five tournament in South Africa. He played in Qatar's opening fixture, against the Cayman Islands, on 3 September 2017. He made 93 runs from 79 balls before being run out, and was named as the man of the match.

In September 2019, he was named in Qatar's squad for the 2019 Malaysia Cricket World Cup Challenge League A tournament. He made his List A debut for Qatar, against Malaysia, in the Cricket World Cup Challenge League A tournament on 20 September 2019. In October 2019, he was named in Qatar's Twenty20 International (T20I) squad for their series against Jersey. In October 2021, he was named in Qatar's squad for the Group A matches in the 2021 ICC Men's T20 World Cup Asia Qualifier.
