= Khurram Shahzad (Qatari cricketer) =

Qatari cricketer (born 1988)

Personal information
- Born: 25 October 1988 (age 38); Quetta, Balochistan, Pakistan
- Batting: Right-handed
- Role: Right-arm offbreak

International information
- National side: Qatar
- T20I debut (cap 17): 12 February 2020 v Uganda
- Last T20I: 26 February 2020 v UAE
- Source: Cricinfo, 26 February 2020

Khurram Shahzad (born 25 October 1988) is a cricketer who plays for the Qatar national cricket team. He was named in Qatar's squad for the 2017 ICC World Cricket League Division Five tournament in South Africa. He played in Qatar's opening fixture, against the Cayman Islands, on 3 September 2017. In September 2019, he was named in Qatar's squad for the 2019 Malaysia Cricket World Cup Challenge League A tournament. He made his List A debut for Qatar, against Singapore, in the Cricket World Cup Challenge League A tournament on 17 September 2019.

In February 2020, he was named in Qatar's team for their three-match Twenty20 International (T20I) series against Uganda. He made his T20I debut for Qatar, against Uganda, on 12 February 2020.
