= Cricket at the 2017 SEA Games – Men's twenty20 tournament =

Men's Twenty20 tournament at the 2017 SEA Games
- Dates: 26 August 2017 – 29 August 2017
- Administrator: Southeast Asian Games Federation
- Cricket format: Twenty20
- Tournament format(s): Round-robin and play-offs
- Host(s): Kinrara Oval; Selangor, Malaysia
- Champions: Singapore
- Participants: 6
- Matches: 8
- Most runs: (Singapore) Navin Param (155)
- Most wickets: (Malaysia) Mohammad Shukri (10)

The men's Twenty20 cricket tournament at the 2017 SEA Games took place at Kinrara Oval in Selangor from 26 to 29 August 2017. Six teams were split into 2 round-robin groups. The first-placed teams in each group qualified for the gold-medal final while the second-placed teams qualified for the bronze-medal final.

== Competition schedule ==
The following was the competition schedule for the men's Twenty20 competitions:

RR	Round-robin	B	3rd place play-off	F	Final

Sat 26	Sun 27	Mon 28	Tue 29	
RR	RR	RR	B	F

== Results ==
All times are Malaysia Standard Time (UTC+08:00)

=== Group stage ===
==== Group A ====
Pos	Team	Pld	W	L	T	NR	NRR	Pts	Final result
1	Singapore	2	2	0	0	0	+6.500	4	Final
2	Indonesia	2	1	1	0	0	–1.175	2	3rd place play-off
3	Vietnam	2	0	2	0	0	–6.342	0	Eliminated

26 August
16:00 (D/N)
Scorecard

Singapore; 167/4 (20 overs)	v	Indonesia; 72 (18 overs)
Anish Paraam 78 (50); Gede Arta 3/19 (2 overs)		Muhaddis 20 (29); Iishaan Shekhar 3/14 (4 overs)

Singapore won by 95 runs
Kinrara Academy Oval, Selangor
Umpires: Batumalai Ramani (Mas) and Shafizan Shahriman (Mas)

- Indonesia won the toss and elected to field.

27 August
14:00
Scorecard

Singapore; 194/3 (20 overs)	v	Vietnam; 29 (15 overs)
Navin Param 63 (39); Thao Le Tien 2/32 (4 overs)		Thao Le Tien 8 (29); Mulewa Dharmichand 3/4 (2 overs)

Singapore won by 165 runs
Kinrara Academy Oval, Selangor
Umpires: Loganathan Poobalan (Mas) and Shafizan Shahriman (Mas)

- Singapore won the toss and elected to bat.
- Singapore advanced to the gold medal final as a result of this match.
- Indonesia and Vietnam could no longer advance to the gold medal final as a result of this match.

28 August
16:00
Scorecard

Vietnam; 64/9 (20 overs)	v	Indonesia; 66/3 (10 overs)
Dang Le Hoang 15 (38); Frengky Shony 3/12 (4 overs)		Kadek Gamantika 19* (15); Phong Pham Huy 2/9 (2 overs)

Indonesia won by 7 wickets
Kinrara Academy Oval, Selangor
Umpires: Visnawadan Kalidas (Mas) and Narayanan Sivan (Mas)

- Vietnam won the toss and elected to bat.
- Indonesia advanced to the 3rd place play-off as a result of this match.
- Vietnam was eliminated from the competition as a result of this match.

==== Group B ====
Pos	Team	Pld	W	L	T	NR	NRR	Pts	Final result
1	Malaysia	2	2	0	0	0	+4.712	4	Final
2	Thailand	2	1	1	0	0	+0.741	2	3rd place play-off
3	Myanmar	2	0	2	0	0	–6.121	0	Eliminated

26 August
19:30 (D/N)
Scorecard

Malaysia; 214/1 (20 overs)	v	Myanmar; 52 (15.2 overs)
Anwar Arudin 115 (65); Sai Htet Wai 0/22 (2 overs)		Ko Ko Lin Thu 7 (13); Ye Naing Tun 7 (13); Mohammad Shukri 5/2 (2.2 overs)

Malaysia won by 162 runs
Kinrara Academy Oval, Selangor
Umpires: Buddhi Pradhan (Nep) and Durga Subedi (Nep)

- Malaysia won the toss and elected to bat.

27 August
18:00
Scorecard

Thailand; 77 (20 overs)	v	Malaysia; 81/3 (17.1 overs)
Kiatiwut Suttisan 25 (22); Mohammad Shukri 3/8 (4 overs)		Suharril Fetri 27* (37); Wanchana Uisuk 1/15 (4 overs)

Malaysia won by 7 wickets
Kinrara Academy Oval, Selangor
Umpires: Buddhi Pradhan (Nep) and Durga Subedi (Nep)

- Thailand won the toss and elected to bat.
- Malaysia advanced to the gold medal final as a result of this match.
- Thailand and Myanmar could no longer advance to the gold medal final as a result of this match.

28 August
19:30 (D/N)
Scorecard

Myanmar; 67 (18 overs)	v	Thailand; 71/3 (11.2 overs)
Ye Naing Tun 12 (20); Payuputh Sungnard 3/19 (4 overs)		Kiatiwut Suttisan 27* (26); Yan Naing Kyaw 2/13 (2.2 overs)

Thailand won by 7 wickets
Kinrara Academy Oval, Selangor
Umpires: Izmir Azraf (Mas) and Shafizan Shahriman (Mas)

- Thailand won the toss and elected to field.
- Thailand advanced to the 3rd place play-off as a result of this match.
- Myanmar was eliminated from the competition as a result of this match.

=== Play-offs ===
==== 3rd place play-off ====
29 August
09:00
Scorecard

Thailand; 96/7 (20 overs)	v	Indonesia; 97/6 (18 overs)
Kiatiwut Suttisan 25 (28); Anjar Tadarus 2/14 (2 overs)		Muhaddis 41 (49); Vichanath Singh 2/13 (4 overs)

Indonesia won by 4 wickets
Kinrara Academy Oval, Selangor
Umpires: Loganathan Poobalan (Mas) and Narayanan Sivan (Mas)

- Thailand won the toss and elected to bat.

==== Final ====
29 August
12:30
Scorecard

Malaysia; 117/7 (20 overs)	v	Singapore; 118/7 (19.5 overs)
Virandeep Singh 57 (51); Mohamed Shoib 2/15 (4 overs)		Riaz Altaff Hussein 37* (41); Mohammad Shukri 2/29 (4 overs)

Singapore won by 3 wickets
Kinrara Academy Oval, Selangor
Umpires: Buddhi Pradhan (Nep) and Durga Subedi (Nep)

- Malaysia won the toss and elected to bat.
