= List of Switzerland Twenty20 International cricketers =

This is a list of Swiss Twenty20 International cricketers.

In April 2018, the ICC decided to grant full Twenty20 International (T20I) status to all its members. Therefore, all Twenty20 matches played between Switzerland and other ICC members after 1 January 2019 have T20I status. Switzerland played their first T20I against Gibraltar on 22 October 2021 during the 2021 Valletta Cup.

This list comprises names of all members of the Switzerland cricket team who have played at least one T20I match. It is initially arranged in the order in which each player won his first Twenty20 cap. Where more than one player won his first Twenty20 cap in the same match, their surnames are listed alphabetically. Cricket in Switzerland is largely played by immigrants from Afghanistan and other countries of the Indian subcontinent.

== Key ==
General

- ‡ – Captain
- † – Wicket-keeper
- First – Year of debut
- Last – Year of latest game
- Mat – Number of matches played

Batting

- Runs – Runs scored in career
- HS – Highest score
- Avg – Runs scored per dismissal
- * – Batsman remained not out
- 50 – Number of half centuries
- 100 – Centuries scored

Bowling

- Balls – Balls bowled in career
- Wkt – Wickets taken in career
- BBI – Best bowling in an innings
- Ave – Average runs per wicket

Fielding

- Ca – Catches taken
- St – Stumpings affected

== List of players ==
Statistics are correct as of 21 June 2026.

Switzerland T20I cricketers
General					Batting					Bowling				Fielding		Ref
No.	Name	First	Last	Mat	Runs	HS	Avg	50	100	Balls	Wkt	BBI	Ave	Ca	St	Ref
1	Aidan Andrews	2021	2022	7	34	30*	17.00	0	0	66	4	3/21	20.50	7	0	
2	Anser Mehmood‡	2021	2022	7	100	29	20.00	0	0	–	–	–	–	3	0	
3	Asad Mahmood	2021	2025	16	74	33	9.25	0	0	–	–	–	–	1	0	
4	Ashwin Vinod	2021	2026	33	73	15*	12.16	0	0	642	39	4/37	20.41	12	0	
5	Stefan Franklin	2021	2021	2	5	5	5.00	0	0	24	0	–	–	1	0	
6	Nicolas Henderson†	2021	2022	5	0	0*	–	0	0	–	–	–	–	5	0	
7	Idrees Ul Haque†	2021	2025	18	297	55	17.47	1	0	–	–	–	–	12	0	
8	Noorkhan Ahmedi	2021	2024	10	81	32	11.57	0	0	12	1	1/12	12.00	5	0	
9	Osama Mahmood	2021	2024	15	314	58*	26.16	2	0	96	4	3/39	26.75	5	0	
10	Ali Nayyer‡	2021	2025	31	327	48*	21.80	0	0	640	39	3/13	20.25	9	0	
11	Arjun Vinod	2021	2026	35	661	67	23.60	1	0	288	11	3/16	33.81	20	0	
12	Aneesh Kumar	2021	2026	36	81	25	9.00	0	0	692	29	3/3	25.86	13	0	
13	Matthew Martin	2021	2021	1	2	2	2.00	0	0	–	–	–	–	1	0	
14	Faheem Nazir‡†	2022	2025	27	985	113	42.82	7	2	317	24	3/14	16.00	8	0	
15	Kenardo Fletcher	2022	2025	21	6	3*	3.00	0	0	414	23	4/24	20.17	8	0	
16	Jai Sinh	2022	2026	18	165	55	13.75	1	0	120	11	5/23	15.00	10	0	
17	Sathya Narayanan†	2022	2022	5	35	25	8.75	0	0	–	–	–	–	6	0	
18	Azeem Nazir	2022	2022	4	36	36	18.00	0	0	–	–	–	–	2	0	
19	Ahmed Hassan†	2023	2026	29	639	59	27.78	2	0	–	–	–	–	20	5	
20	Muralitharan Gnanasekaram	2023	2026	8	5	3	5.00	0	0	–	–	–	–	4	0	
21	Izhar Hussain	2023	2026	7	71	29	17.75	0	0	13	0	–	–	1	0	
22	Abdullah Rana	2023	2024	4	42	25	10.50	0	0	132	14	3/16	13.14	0	0	
23	Afif Khattak	2023	2023	1	–	–	–	0	0	18	1	1/23	23.00	0	0	
24	Malyar Stanikzai	2024	2026	23	336	36	17.68	0	0	216	9	2/18	35.88	5	0	
25	Bashir Ahmad	2024	2024	1	5	5	5.00	0	0	12	0	–	–	0	0	
26	Grant Cupido	2025	2025	5	21	11	7.00	0	0	–	–	–	–	2	0	
27	Harsha Deshan‡	2025	2026	22	407	76	21.42	2	0	218	13	3/18	20.69	9	0	
28	Diyon Johnson	2025	2026	22	262	55	13.78	1	0	282	10	2/26	33.22	2	0	
29	Sheraz Sarwari	2025	2026	10	42	30	8.40	0	0	189	9	3/29	28.22	3	0	
30	Isaac Stewart	2025	2026	9	47	30	23.50	0	0	126	5	4/20	39.60	2	0	
31	Hugo Elder	2025	2025	2	2	2*	2.00	0	0	30	1	1/15	32.00	0	0	
32	Khalid Niazi	2025	2026	8	29	13*	29.00	0	0	121	10	4/27	16.30	6	0	
33	Qateel Zabiullah	2025	2025	3	50	32	16.66	0	0	–	–	–	–	0	0	
34	Jai Tiwari	2025	2026	4	38	21	19.00	0	0	–	–	–	–	0	0	
35	Numan Ahmadzai	2025	2026	7	98	36	19.60	0	0	–	–	–	–	1	0	
36	Musa Khan Ahmadzai	2026	2026	9	5	2*	5.00	0	0	165	13	3/7	16.69	1	0	
37	Shankar Panguluri	2026	2026	1	8	8	8.00	0	0	–	–	–	–	0	0	
38	Naim Stanikzai	2026	2026	4	114	44*	57.00	0	0	–	–	–	–	3	0	
39	Raihan Stanikzai	2026	2026	4	82	51	20.50	1	0	66	3	1/17	31.66	1	0	
40	Sahil Tarakhil	2026	2026	4	78	57	19.50	1	0	–	–	–	–	1	0	
41	Jamal Stanikzai	2026	2026	2	–	–	–	–	–	36	1	1/41	56.00	1	0	
