= Suresh Appusamy =

Tamil Nadu-born Singaporean cricketer (born 1987)

Suresh Appusamy is an Indian-born Singapore cricketer. He was born in Namakkal, Tamil Nadu on June 16, 1987. He is a right arm batsman and right-arm medium pace bowler.

== Statistics ==
He plays for Singapore national cricket team. He played for the team in the 2014 ICC World Cricket League Division Three. His best bowling figures are 4/16 vs Maldives national cricket team and 4/35 vs Sinhalese.

=== Recent matches ===
Suresh Appusamy scored 6* and 2/12 vs Bhutan national cricket team. He took 1 wicket giving 21 runs against Kuwait national cricket team on 25 January 2015 and the same against Malaysia national cricket team on 30 January 2015 both at Sharjah.
