= Mohamed Shoib =

Singaporean cricketer (born 1977)

Personal information
- Born: 12 September 1977 (age 49); Singapore
- Batting: Right-handed

International information
- National side: Singapore
Medal record
Representing Singapore
Men's Cricket
Southeast Asian Games
Gold medal – first place	2017 Kuala Lumpur	Twenty20
Silver medal – second place	2017 Kuala Lumpur	50 over
- Source: Cricinfo, 24 October 2014

Mohamed Shoib Abdul Razzak (born 12 September 1977) is a Singaporean former cricketer. Shoib played in the 2014 ICC World Cricket League Division Three tournament. He retired from international cricket after winning a gold medal with Singapore in the Twenty20 event and a silver medal in the 50-over event at the 2017 Southeast Asian Games.
