= Srini Santhanam =

American cricketer (born 1984)

Personal information
- Born: 21 May 1984 (age 42); Chennai, India
- Batting: Right-handed

International information
- National side: United States
- Source: Cricinfo, 24 October 2014

Srini Santhanam (born 21 May 1984) is an American cricketer. He was named in the United States squad for the 2013 ICC World Twenty20 Qualifier tournament. He made his Twenty20 debut during the tournament, against Canada, on 15 November 2013.
