= Vietnam national cricket team =

Vietnam

Personnel
- Coach: Mick Blinkhoff

International Cricket Council
- ICC status: Non-member
- As of 20 July 2017

The Vietnam national cricket team represents Vietnam in international cricket. It debuted in the cricket tournament at the 2017 Southeast Asian Games in Kuala Lumpur, Malaysia.

== History ==
The sports association for cricket in Vietnam is the Vietnam Cricket Association which was established in 2005. In 2013 it was reported that only one league player have played in the VCA's league since its formation and that Vietnam has yet to form a national team for cricket.

The association gained sponsorship from Suntory PepsiCo Vietnam Beverage (SPVB) – a strategic alliance between Suntory and PepsiCo. However, in 2015 the company threatened to withdraw sponsorship unless a commitment was made to develop the sport locally. By the end of the year, a strategic roadmap was presented to the Government of Vietnam Ministry of Culture, Sports and Tourism.

A national team composing Vietnamese natives began to be assembled, drawing mainly from the Ho Chi Minh City University of Sport. Several members of the squad had previous experience in baseball (also a relatively new sport in this part of the world) and two had previously played on the Vietnam national baseball team. The team began playing in the VCA league to gain experience, which had previously been expat-only. Their coach was Australian expat Mick Blinkhoff. By early 2017, in preparation for the SEA Games in August, the national squad members were training five days a week and got a government stipend of VND5 million per week (INR14,148; USD219.5; GBP171.35). The VCA already has one eye on the 2021 Southeast Asian Games, hosted in Hanoi.

== See also ==
- Cricket in Vietnam
- Cricket in Central Vietnam
