= Babar Hussain =

Pakistani cricketer (born 1984)

Personal information
- Born: 23 September 1984 (age 42); Karachi, Pakistan
- Source: ESPNcricinfo, 3 October 2016

Babar Hussain Agha (born 23 September 1984) is a Pakistani first-class cricketer who plays for Karachi Whites.
