= Hanoi Cricket Club =

The Hanoi Cricket Club was founded in Hanoi in 1993 in light of the growing popularity of cricket among expatriates from England and other cricket playing nations. The club, which hosted a game against a combined English/Australian team in the year of its founding, is one of 40 playing in a club season from March to May, following the full Vietnamese cricket season which runs between September and December. Often played on rattan mats, with altered run ups to accommodate, an HCC player hit the club's first century in 2000.
