= Nazril Rahman =

Malaysian cricketer (born 1993)

Personal information
- Born: 21 January 1993 (age 33); Kuala Lumpur, Malaysia

International information
- National side: Malaysia
- T20I debut (cap 7): 24 June 2019 v Thailand
- Last T20I: 3 July 2022 v Bhutan
- Source: ESPNcricinfo, 3 July 2022

Mohamad Nazril Abdul Rahman (born 21 January 1993) is a Malaysian cricketer. He played in the 2014 ICC World Cricket League Division Five tournament.

In June 2019, he was named in Malaysia's squad for the 2019 Malaysia Tri-Nation Series tournament. He made his Twenty20 International (T20I) debut against Thailand, on 24 June 2019. In September 2019, he was named in Malaysia's squad for the 2019 Malaysia Cricket World Cup Challenge League A tournament. He made his List A debut for Malaysia, against Qatar, in the Cricket World Cup Challenge League A tournament on 20 September 2019.
