= Norwira Zazmie =

Malaysian cricketer (born 1990)

Personal information
- Born: 26 February 1990 (age 36); Parit Bunder, Malaysia

International information
- National side: Malaysia
Medal record
Representing Malaysia
Men's Cricket
Southeast Asian Games
Gold medal – first place	2017 Kuala Lumpur	50 over
- Source: Cricinfo, 12 September 2019

Norwira Zazmie (born 26 February 1990) is a Malaysian cricketer. He was part of Malaysia's squad for the 2008 Under-19 Cricket World Cup. In September 2019, he was named in Malaysia's squad for the 2019 Malaysia Cricket World Cup Challenge League A tournament. He made his List A debut for Malaysia, against Denmark, in the Cricket World Cup Challenge League A tournament on 16 September 2019.
