= Rashid Ahad =

Malaysian cricketer (born 1990)

Personal information
- Full name: Abdul Rashid Bin Ahad
- Born: 20 March 1990 (age 36); Gemencheh, Negeri Sembilan, Malaysia
- Batting: Right-handed
- Bowling: Right-arm leg break

International information
- National side: Malaysia
Medal record
Men's Cricket
Representing Malaysia
Southeast Asian Games
Gold medal – first place	2017 Kuala Lumpur	50 over
- Source: ESPNcricinfo, 22 June 2019

Abdul Rashid Bin Ahad (born 20 March 1990), also known as Abdul Rashid Ahad, is a Malaysian cricketer. He was a member of the Malaysian cricket team which claimed gold medal in the men's 50 overs tournament after defeating Singapore by 251 runs in the finals at the 2017 Southeast Asian Games.

In September 2019, he was named in Malaysia's squad for the 2019 Malaysia Cricket World Cup Challenge League A tournament. He made his List A debut for Malaysia, against Vanuatu, in the Cricket World Cup Challenge League A tournament on 25 September 2019.
