= Shukri Rahim =

Malaysian cricketer

Mohammad Shukri
Personal information
- Full name: Mohammad Shukri Abdul Rahim
- Born: 6 October 1986 (age 40); Kelantan, Malaysia
- Batting: Right-handed
- Bowling: Left-arm orthodox spin

Career statistics
Competition	First-class
Matches	2
Runs scored	12
Batting average	4.00
100s/50s	0/0
Top score	5
Balls bowled	156
Wickets	5
Bowling average	19.00
5 wickets in innings	0
10 wickets in match	0
Best bowling	3/32
Catches/stumpings	1/0
Medal record
Representing Malaysia
Men's Cricket
Southeast Asian Games
Gold medal – first place	2017 Kuala Lumpur	50 over
Silver medal – second place	2017 Kuala Lumpur	Twenty20
- Source: CricketArchive, 12 January 2008

Mohammad Shukri Abdul Rahim usually known as Mohammad Shukri (born 6 October 1986) is a Malaysian cricketer. A right-handed batsman and left-arm orthodox spin bowler, he has played for the Malaysia national cricket team since 2002.

== Biography ==
Born in Kelantan in 1986, Mohammad Shukri first represented his country at Under-15 level, playing in the ACC Under-15 Trophy in Kuala Lumpur in 2000. He also played in the ICC Under-17 Asia Cup in Pakistan the same year, and played in the ACC Under-17 Asia Cup in Bangladesh in 2001. He made his debut for the Malaysian senior side in 2002, playing in the Saudara Cup match against Singapore.

In 2003, he played in the Stan Nagaiah Trophy series against Singapore before playing for Malaysia Under-19s in the Youth Asia Cup in Karachi. He made his first-class debut the following year, playing against Nepal and the UAE in the ICC Intercontinental Cup. The same year, he also played for a Malaysia Cricket Association Invitation XI against England A and played in the Stan Nagaiah Trophy, the Saudara Cup and in the ACC Trophy against Saudi Arabia.

In April 2005, he played for Malaysia Under-15s in the ACC Under-15 Cup in the United Arab Emirates, despite being 18 years old at the time. He played in the Saudara Cup match against Singapore later in the year, in addition to the ACC Under-19 Cup in Nepal. He played twice for Malaysia in 2006, both times against Singapore.

He played for Malaysia Under-19s against Sri Lanka Under-19s and England Under-19s in January 2007, though he was 20 at the time. After playing in that year's Saudara Cup match, he most recently represented his country at the ACC Twenty20 Cup in Kuwait in October 2007.

He was a member of the Malaysian cricket team which claimed gold medal in the men's 50 overs tournament after defeating Singapore by 251 runs in the finals at the 2017 Southeast Asian Games.

In April 2018, he was named in Malaysia's squad for the 2018 ICC World Cricket League Division Four tournament, also in Malaysia.
