= Derek Duraisingam =

Malaysian cricketer (born 1992)

Derek Duraisingham
Personal information
- Born: 21 February 1992 (age 34)
Medal record
Representing Malaysia
Men's Cricket
Southeast Asian Games
Gold medal – first place	2017 Kuala Lumpur	50 over
Silver medal – second place	2017 Kuala Lumpur	Twenty20
- Source: Cricinfo, 29 December 2017

Derek Duraisingam (born 21 February 1992) is a Malaysian cricketer. He is a right hand batsman and right arm medium pace bowler.

== Career ==
Duraisingam made his List A cricket debut for Malaysia national cricket team in 2014 ICC World Cricket League Division Three. In this tournament he took 3/23 wickets in a match against Uganda on 27 October 2014.

He was a member of the Malaysian cricket team which claimed gold medal in the men's 50 overs tournament after defeating Indonesia by 251 runs in the last match the 2017 Southeast Asian Games.
