= Suhan Alagaratnam =

Malaysian cricketer

Personal information
- Full name: Suhan Kumar Alagaratnam
- Born: 15 November 1986 (age 39); Banting, Selangor, Malaysia
- Batting: Right-handed
- Role: Batsman

International information
- National side: Malaysia (2005–present)
- Source: Cricinfo, 24 October 2014

Suhan Kumar Alagaratnam (born 15 November 1986) is a Malaysian cricketer and the former captain of the Malaysia national team. He is one of Malaysia's most successful batsmen with over 3,000 runs, over a 13-year period. He most recently played at 2018 ICC World Cricket League Division Four in April 2018.

== Career ==
Born in Selangor in 1986, Suhan Alagaratnam made his debut for the Malaysian national team in 2005 against Singapore. Suhan quickly established his place as a batsman in the middle order. This was highlighted by his 278 runs at an average of 55.60 in the 2008 ACC Trophy Elite. Suhan claimed the best batsman award in the tournament after scoring centuries against Singapore and Saudi Arabia. Later in that year, at the age of 22, he took over the captaincy from Rohan Suppiah and went onto lead Malaysia for the next five years.

Malaysia's progress as a cricketing nation developed under the captaincy of Suhan. He led the team to victory in the T20 version of the 2010 Air Niugini Supa Series in Papua New Guinea after resounding wins over Hong Kong and Singapore. Malaysia also managed to retain the Saudara Cup and Stan Nagaiah Trophy in three successive years under his tenure. Suhan often ventured over to Australia during their summer to play grade cricket. It resulted in Suhan becoming one of Malaysia's most dependable players, along with Rakesh Madhavan and Suresh Navaratnam. He averaged over 45 with the bat in this period.

Suhan resigned as captain in late 2013 and was replaced by Ahmad Faiz. Without the pressure of captaincy, he could focus purely on his batting. After a poor run of matches, Suhan bounced back with a crucial match-winning century (101 off 96 balls) against Singapore in the third place play-off at 2014 ICC World Cricket League Division Three. It saw Malaysia reach a record high ranking of 23rd in the world.

The majority of Suhan's batting career was spent batting at number four. For the 2015 ACC Twenty20 Cup, he was given a new role as opening batsman. He thrived in the role with 174 runs at a strike rate of 155.35, which included 86 off 45 balls against Kuwait.

Domestically, Suhan plied his trade for Kuala Lumpur and Selangor. He captained Selangor through an unbeaten season in 2015 to win the Malaysian Premier League title.

With over 3,000 runs scored for Malaysia since his debut, Suhan decided to take a break from his international career. He moved to Canada and continued to play cricket at club level.

After a three-year gap, he returned to the Malaysian national team for 2018 ICC World Cricket League Division Four. In the opening match of the tournament, he top-scored with 61 as Malaysia defeated the favourites Uganda. He was in Malaysia's squad in the Eastern sub-region group for the 2018–19 ICC World Twenty20 Asia Qualifier tournament.
