= Mulewa Dharmichand =

Indian born Singaporean cricketer

Personal information
- Born: 4 April 1984 (age 42); Pali, Rajasthan, India
- Batting: Right-handed
- Bowling: Off spin
- Role: Bowler

Domestic team information
- Years: Team
- 2000–2002: Karnataka
- FC debut: 8 November 2000 Karnataka v Tamil Nadu
- Last FC: 17 November 2002 Karnataka v Bihar
- Only LA: 5 January 2002 Karnataka v Goa

Career statistics
Competition	First-class	List A
Matches	5	1
Runs scored	16	–
Batting average	5.33	–
100s/50s	0/0	–
Top score	13*	–
Balls bowled	414	30
Wickets	2	2
Bowling average	134.00	9.50
5 wickets in innings	0	0
10 wickets in match	0	0
Best bowling	1/13	2/19
Catches/stumpings	1/–	1/–
Medal record
Representing Singapore
Men's Cricket
Southeast Asian Games
Gold medal – first place	2017 Kuala Lumpur	Twenty20
Silver medal – second place	2017 Kuala Lumpur	50 over
- Source: CricketArchive, 9 August 2008

Mulewa Dharmichand (born 4 April 1984) is an Indian-born Singaporean cricketer. A right-handed batsman and off spin bowler, he has played for the Singapore national cricket team since 2004, having previously played under-19 Test matches for India Under-19s and first-class cricket for Karnataka.

== Biography ==
Born in Rajasthan in 1984, Mulewa Dharmichand played for Karnataka at Under-16, Under-19 and Under-22 levels before making his first-class debut for them in a Ranji Trophy match against Tamil Nadu in November 2000. He played three Test matches for India Under-19s against England Under-19s in January 2001.

He played his only List A match for Karnataka against Goa in January 2002, and his first-class career with them came to an end in November that year with Ranji Trophy matches against Maharashtra and Bihar.

He first played for Singapore in the Stan Nagaiah Trophy series against Malaysia in 2004, playing in the event again the following two years. He played in the ACC Trophy in Kuala Lumpur in 2006, and in the Saudara Cup match against Malaysia the same year.

In 2007, he played in the Saudara Cup match and in the ACC Twenty20 Cup, whilst in 2008 he played in the Stan Nagaiah Trophy series, Division Five of the World Cricket League in Jersey, and most recently represented his adopted country in the 2008 ACC Trophy, where he played in the team's fifth place play-off against Malaysia.
