= Muhammad Hafiz =

Malaysian cricketer (born 1999)

Muhammad Hafizd
Personal information
- Full name: Muhammad hafizd
- Born: 3 April 1999 (age 27)

International information
- National side: Indonesia
- Source: Cricinfo

Muhammad Hafizd (born 3 April 1999) is an Indonesian cricketer. He was named in Indonesia squad for the Indonesia Cricket World Cup Challenge League A tournament. He made his List A debut for Indonesia, against Denmark, in the Cricket World Cup Challenge League A tournament on 16 September 2019.
