= Aminuddin Ramly =

Malaysian cricketer (born 1990)

Personal information
- Born: 16 May 1990 (age 36); Kuala Pilah, Malaysia
- Batting: Right-handed

International information
- National side: Malaysia
- T20I debut (cap 8): 24 June 2019 v Thailand
- Last T20I: 22 April 2021 v Nepal
Medal record
Representing Malaysia
Men's Cricket
Southeast Asian Games
Silver medal – second place	2017 Kuala Lumpur	Twenty20
- Source: Cricinfo, 22 April 2021

Aminuddin Ramly (born 16 May 1990) is a Malaysian cricketer. He was part of Malaysia's squad for the 2008 Under-19 Cricket World Cup. He played in the 2014 ICC World Cricket League Division Three tournament.

In June 2019, he was named in Malaysia's squad for the 2019 Malaysia Tri-Nation Series tournament. Ramly made his Twenty20 International (T20I) debut against Thailand, on 24 June 2019. In September 2019, he was named in Malaysia's squad for the 2019 Malaysia Cricket World Cup Challenge League A tournament. He made his List A debut against Denmark, in the Cricket World Cup Challenge League A tournament on 16 September 2019.
