= Cricket at the 2017 SEA Games – Men's 50 over tournament =

Men's 50 over tournament at the 2017 SEA Games
- Dates: 17 August – 24 August 2017
- Administrator: Southeast Asian Games Federation
- Cricket format: 50 over
- Tournament format: Round-robin
- Host(s): Kinrara Oval; Selangor, Malaysia
- Champions: Malaysia
- Participants: 5
- Matches: 10
- Most runs: (Malaysia) Anwar Arudin (210)
- Most wickets: (Singapore) Mulewa Dharmichand (12)

The men's 50 over cricket tournament at the 2017 SEA Games took place at Kinrara Oval in Selangor from 17 to 24 August 2017. The competition was held in a round-robin format, and based on each team's points after playing four matches, the top three teams were declared medal winners.

== Competition schedule ==
The following was the competition schedule for the men's 50-over competitions:

RR	Round robin

Thu 17	Fri 18	Sat 19	Sun 20	Mon 21	Tue 22	Wed 23	Thu 24
RR	RR	RR	RR	RR	RR	RR	RR

== Results ==
All times used are Malaysia Standard Time (UTC+08:00)

=== Round-robin ===
Pos	Team	Pld	W	L	T	NR	NRR	Pts	Final result
1	Malaysia	4	4	0	0	0	+3.512	8	Gold medal
2	Singapore	4	3	1	0	0	+1.642	6	Silver medal
3	Thailand	4	2	2	0	0	+0.282	4	Bronze medal
4	Myanmar	4	1	3	0	0	-1.953	2	
5	Indonesia	4	0	4	0	0	-3.575	0	

Updated to matches played on 24 August 2017. Source: ESPNCricInfo

17 August
08:00
Scorecard

Myanmar; 61 (29.4 overs)	v	Thailand; 63/1 (13.3 overs)
Zarni Thein 11 (41); Payuputh Sungnard 3/13 (5.4 overs)		Payuputh Sungnard 16 (16); Ko Ko Lin Thu 1/6 (2.0 overs)

Thailand won by 9 wickets
Kinrara Academy Oval, Selangor
Umpires: Viswanadan Kalidas (Mas) and Loganathan Poobalan (Mas)

- Thailand won the toss and elected to field.
- Match was shortened to 43 overs per side.

17 August
16:10 (D/N)
Scorecard

Indonesia; 89 (29.4 overs)	v	Singapore; 90/1 (20.4 overs)
Geda Arsa 32 (46); Anantha Krishna 4/3 (4.4 overs)		Navin Param 36 (53); I Kadek Gamantika 1/25 (5 overs)

Singapore won by 9 wickets
Kinrara Academy Oval, Selangor
Umpires: Shafizan Shahriman (Mas) and Narayanan Sivan (Mas)

- Singapore won the toss and elected to field.

18 August
09:00
Scorecard

Malaysia; 265/6 (50 overs)	v	Thailand; 105 (35 overs)
Virandeep Singh 79 (86); Nopphon Senamontree 2/69 (10 overs)		Chanchai Pengkumta 21 (55); Dhivendran Mogan 3/10 (7 overs)

Malaysia won by 160 runs
Kinrara Academy Oval, Selangor
Umpires: Buddhi Pradhan (Nep) and Durga Subedi (Nep)

- Thailand won the toss and elected to field.

19 August
09:30
Scorecard

Indonesia; 96 (27 overs)	v	Myanmar; 97/6 (24.3 overs)
Geda Arsa 45* (89); Paing Danu 5/9 (7 overs)		Htet Lin Aung 25* (41); Putra Kisawa 2/14 (6 overs)

Myanmar won by 4 wickets
Kinrara Academy Oval, Selangor
Umpires: Batumalai Ramani (Mas) and Zaidan Taha (Mas)

- Indonesia won the toss and elected to bat.
- First ever victory in international cricket for Myanmar.

20 August
08:00
Scorecard

Myanmar; 98 (42 overs)	v	Singapore; 100/6 (13.5 overs)
Htet Lin Aung 22 (70); Mulewa Dharmichand 7/22 (10 overs)		Navin Param 37 (33); Paing Danu 5/23 (4.5 overs)

Singapore won by 4 wickets
Kinrara Academy Oval, Selangor
Umpires: Loganathan Poobalan (Mas) and Narayanan Sivan (Mas)

- Singapore won the toss and elected to field.

20 August
16:10 (D/N)
Scorecard

Thailand; 242/5 (50 overs)	v	Indonesia; 63 (25.4 overs)
Wanchana Uisuk 102 (134); Frengky Shony 1/39 (10 overs)		Ahmad Ramdoni 23 (55); Vichanath Singh 3/2 (5.4 overs)

Thailand won by 179 runs
Kinrara Academy Oval, Selangor
Umpires: Izmir Azraf (Mas) and Zaidan Taha (Mas)

- Indonesia won the toss and elected to field.
- Indonesia was eliminated from gold and silver medal contention as a result of this match.

21 August
14:00 (D/N)
Scorecard

Myanmar; 45 (22 overs)	v	Malaysia; 46/0 (4 overs)
Min Wai 12 (46); Derek Duraisingam 5/26 (9 overs)		Shafiq Sharif 37* (16); Min Wai 0/21 (2 overs)

Malaysia won by 10 wickets
Kinrara Academy Oval, Selangor
Umpires: Buddhi Pradhan (Nep) and Durga Subedi (Nep)

- Myanmar won the toss and elected to bat.
- Malaysia, Singapore, and Thailand secured medals as a result of this match.
- Indonesia and Myanmar were eliminated from medal contention as a result of this match.

22 August
14:00 (D/N)
Scorecard

Singapore; 187/9 (50 overs)	v	Thailand; 124 (41.2 overs)
Abhiraj Singh 65 (104); Vichanath Singh 3/21 (10 overs)		Chanchai Pengkumta 21 (39); Mulewa Dharmichand 5/35 (10 overs)

Singapore won by 63 runs
Kinrara Academy Oval, Selangor
Umpires: Izmir Azraf (Mas) and Zaidan Taha (Mas)

- Singapore won the toss and elected to bat.
- Singapore secured a minimum of silver medal as a result of this match.
- Thailand was eliminated from gold medal contention as a result of this match.

23 August
15:30 (D/N)
Scorecard

Singapore; 195 (49.3 overs)	v	Malaysia; 196/4 (44.1 overs)
Rezza Gaznavi 86* (116); Derek Duraisingam 3/35 (8.3 overs)		Ahmed Faiz 105 (118); Mohamed Shoib 4/42 (10 overs)

Malaysia won by 6 wickets
Kinrara Academy Oval, Selangor
Umpires: Buddhi Pradhan (Nep) and Durga Subedi (Nep)

- Singapore won the toss and elected to bat.
- Thailand got bronze medal as a result of this match.
- Malaysia secured a minimum of silver medal as a result of this match.

24 August
13:30
Scorecard

Malaysia; 320 (49.4 overs)	v	Indonesia; 69 (22 overs)
Anwar Arudin 162 (108); Kadek Gamantika 4/53 (9.4 overs)		Anjar Tadarus 29 (40); Anwar Rahman 5/29 (8 overs)

Malaysia won by 251 runs
Kinrara Academy Oval, Selangor
Umpires: Buddhi Pradhan (Nep) and Durga Subedi (Nep)

- Malaysia won the toss and elected to bat.
- Malaysia got gold medal as a result of this match.
- Singapore got silver medal as a result of this match.
