= Suharril Fetri =

Malaysian cricketer (born 1989)

Personal information
- Born: 7 May 1989 (age 37)
- Batting: Right-handed

International information
- National side: Malaysia
Medal record
Representing Malaysia
Men's Cricket
Southeast Asian Games
| Gold medal – first place | 2017 Kuala Lumpur | 50 over |
| Silver medal – second place | 2017 Kuala Lumpur | Twenty20 |
- Source: Cricinfo, 24 October 2014

Suharril Fetri (born 7 May 1989) is a Malaysian cricketer. He was part of Malaysia's squad for the 2008 Under-19 Cricket World Cup. He played in the 2014 ICC World Cricket League Division Three tournament. In April 2018, he was named in Malaysia's squad for the 2018 ICC World Cricket League Division Four tournament, also in Malaysia. He was in Malaysia's squads for the 2018 Asia Cup Qualifier tournament, and for the 2019 Malaysia Cricket World Cup Challenge League A tournament. He made his List A debut for Malaysia, against Denmark, in the Cricket World Cup Challenge League A tournament on 16 September 2019.
