= 2023 Men's T20 World Cup EAP regional final =

Cricket qualification tournament

2023 ICC Men's T20 World Cup EAP regional final
- Dates: 22 – 29 July 2023
- Administrator(s): International Cricket Council; ICC East Asia-Pacific
- Cricket format: Twenty20 International
- Tournament format: Double round-robin
- Host: Papua New Guinea
- Champions: Papua New Guinea
- Runners-up: Japan
- Participants: 4
- Matches: 12
- Player of the series: (Vanuatu) Nalin Nipiko
- Most runs: (Japan) Kendel Kadowaki-Fleming (216)
- Most wickets: (Vanuatu) Nalin Nipiko (13)

The 2024 ICC Men's T20 World Cup was the ninth edition of the ICC Men's T20 World Cup, a biennial world cup for cricket in Twenty20 International (T20I) format, organized by the International Cricket Council (ICC). The qualification process for the world cup included two stages: direct qualification and regional qualification. The regional qualification for East Asia-Pacific (EAP) was held in two stages: sub-regional qualifiers and the regional final.

The EAP regional final was hosted by Cricket PNG from 22 to 29 July 2023. Papua New Guinea qualified for the T20 World Cup after finishing atop the points table. Vanuatu's Nalin Nipiko was named player of the series having taken the most wickets (13) while Japan's Kendel Kadowaki-Fleming scored the most runs (216) in the tournament.

== Teams and qualification ==
A total of 7 teams participated in the sub-regional phase, which was divided into two events with four/three teams competing in each event. The top sides of each sub-regional qualifier advanced to the regional final, where they joined Papua New Guinea and Philippines who received a bye after taking part in the 2022 global qualifiers.

Method of qualification	Date	Venue(s)	No. of teams	Team
2022 global qualifier A	24 February 2022	Oman	1	Philippines
2022 global qualifier B	17 July 2022	Zimbabwe	1	Papua New Guinea
Sub-regional qualifier A	9 – 15 September 2022	Vanuatu	1	Vanuatu
Sub-regional qualifier B	15 – 18 October 2022	Japan	1	Japan
Total			4	

== Squads ==
- Source: International Cricket Council

Japan	Papua New Guinea	Philippines	Vanuatu
Kendel Kadowaki-Fleming (c); Ryan Drake; Kohei Kubota; Piyush Kumbhare; Wataru Miyauchi (wk); Supun Navaratne (wk); Sabaorish Ravichandran; Reo Sakurano-Thomas; Alexander Shirai-Patmore (wk); Mian Siddique; Declan Suzuki; Tsuyoshi Takada; Ibrahim Takahashi; Makoto Taniyama; Lachlan Yamamoto-Lake	Assad Vala (c); Charles Amini; Sese Bau; Kiplin Doriga (wk); Jack Gardner; Hiri Hiri; Riley Hekure; Semo Kamea; John Kariko; Kabua Morea; Alei Nao; Lega Siaka; Tony Ura; Norman Vanua; Hila Vare (wk)	Daniel Smith (c); Jordan Alegre; Gurbhupinder Chohan; Josef Doctora; Hern Isorena; Kapil Kumar; Kepler Lukies; Huzaifa Mohammed; Liam Myott; Miggy Podosky; Grant Russ (wk); Arshdeep Samra; ~~Kulwinder Sangha~~; Surinder Singh; Amanpreet Sirah; ~~Henry Tyler~~; Francis Walsh	Patrick Matautaava (c); Ronald Tari (vc); Jarryd Allan (wk); Junior Kaltapau; Andrew Mansale; Williamsing Nalisa; Nalin Nipiko; Simpson Obed; Joshua Rasu; Apolinaire Stephen; Clement Tommy (wk); Jamal Vira (wk); Darren Wotu; Womejo Wotu; Obed Yosef

== Points table ==
Pos	Team	Pld	W	L	NR	Pts	NRR	Qualification
1	Papua New Guinea	6	6	0	0	12	4.189	Qualified for the 2024 Men's T20 World Cup
2	Japan	6	3	3	0	6	0.105	
3	Vanuatu	6	2	4	0	4	−1.170	
4	Philippines	6	1	5	0	2	−2.697	

Source: ESPNcricinfo

== Fixtures ==
22 July 2023
09:00
Scorecard

Japan; 166/7 (20 overs)	v	Philippines; 113/5 (20 overs)
Kendel Kadowaki-Fleming 60 (37); Amanpreet Sirah 3/32 (4 overs)		Jordan Alegre 33 (29); Piyush Kumbhare 2/11 (4 overs)

Japan won by 53 runs
Amini Park, Port Moresby
Umpires: Phillip Gillespie (Aus) and Alu Kapa (PNG)
Player of the match: Kendel Kadowaki-Fleming (Jpn)

- Japan won the toss and elected to bat.
- Liam Myott (Phi) made his T20I debut.

22 July 2023
13:30
Scorecard

Vanuatu; 71/8 (20 overs)	v	Papua New Guinea; 75/1 (6.3 overs)
Ronald Tari 21 (34); John Kariko 3/6 (4 overs)		Assad Vala 34* (17); Patrick Matautaava 1/14 (1.3 overs)

Papua New Guinea won by 9 wickets
Amini Park, Port Moresby
Umpires: Shaun Haig (NZ) and Claire Polosak (Aus)
Player of the match: John Kariko (PNG)

- Vanuatu won the toss and elected to bat.
- John Kariko (PNG) made his T20I debut.

23 July 2023
09:00
Scorecard

Japan; 131 (19.4 overs)	v	Vanuatu; 110/8 (20 overs)
Kendel Kadowaki-Fleming 65 (54); Nalin Nipiko 4/17 (4 overs)		Andrew Mansale 29 (33); Ryan Drake 3/16 (3 overs)

Japan won by 21 runs
Amini Park, Port Moresby
Umpires: Alu Kapa (PNG) and Claire Polosak (Aus)
Player of the match: Kendel Kadowaki-Fleming (Jpn)

- Vanuatu won the toss and elected to field.

23 July 2023
13:30
Scorecard

Papua New Guinea; 162/7 (20 overs)	v	Philippines; 45 (17 overs)
Hiri Hiri 46 (27); Kepler Lukies 2/17 (4 overs)		Grant Russ 18 (28); Kabua Morea 5/9 (4 overs)

Papua New Guinea won by 117 runs
Amini Park, Port Moresby
Umpires: Phillip Gillespie (Aus) and Shaun Haig (NZ)
Player of the match: Kabua Morea (PNG)

- Papua New Guinea won the toss and elected to bat.
- Jack Gardner (PNG) made his T20I debut.
- Kabua Morea (PNG) took his first hat-trick in T20Is.

25 July 2023
09:00
Scorecard

Vanuatu; 97 (19.3 overs)	v	Philippines; 98/4 (17.4 overs)
Jarryd Allan 36 (35); Huzaifa Mohammed 2/8 (4 overs)		Jordan Alegre 30 (29); Williamsing Nalisa 2/14 (4 overs)

Philippines won by 6 wickets
Amini Park, Port Moresby
Umpires: Phillip Gillespie (Aus) and Alu Kapa (PNG)
Player of the match: Daniel Smith (Phi)

- Vanuatu won the toss and elected to bat.
- Arashdeep Samra (Phi) made his T20I debut.

25 July 2023
13:30
Scorecard

Japan; 87/8 (20 overs)	v	Papua New Guinea; 92/4 (15.1 overs)
Declan Suzuki 34* (38); Semo Kamea 2/17 (4 overs)		Charles Amini 30* (28); Reo Sakurano-Thomas 2/7 (3 overs)

Papua New Guinea won by 6 wickets
Amini Park, Port Moresby
Umpires: Shaun Haig (NZ) and Claire Polosak (Aus)
Player of the match: Semo Kamea (PNG)

- Japan won the toss and elected to bat.

26 July 2023
09:00
Scorecard

Papua New Guinea; 148/7 (20 overs)	v	Vanuatu; 109 (19.2 overs)
Assad Vala 43 (38); Nalin Nipiko 2/20 (3 overs)		Simpson Obed 21* (11); Norman Vanua 3/34 (4 overs)

Papua New Guinea won by 39 runs
Amini Park, Port Moresby
Umpires: Phillip Gillespie (Aus) and Claire Polosak (Aus)
Player of the match: Norman Vanua (PNG)

- Papua New Guinea won the toss and elected to bat.

26 July 2023
13:30
Scorecard

Japan; 127/9 (20 overs)	v	Philippines; 94/5 (20 overs)
Sabaorish Ravichandran 41 (26); Liam Myott 2/21 (4 overs)		Grant Russ 43* (52); Declan Suzuki 2/14 (3 overs)

Japan won by 33 runs
Amini Park, Port Moresby
Umpires: Shaun Haig (NZ) and Alu Kapa (PNG)
Player of the match: Sabaorish Ravichandran (Jpn)

- Japan won the toss and elected to bat.
- Wataru Miyauchi and Mian Siddique (Jpn) both made their T20I debuts.

28 July 2023
09:00
Scorecard

Japan; 136 (19.5 overs)	v	Vanuatu; 137/5 (19.3 overs)
Kendel Kadowaki-Fleming 44 (34); Nalin Nipiko 4/28 (3.5 overs)		Nalin Nipiko 74* (50); Piyush Kumbhare 1/15 (4 overs)

Vanuatu won by 5 wickets
Amini Park, Port Moresby
Umpires: Shaun Haig (NZ) and Alu Kapa (PNG)
Player of the match: Nalin Nipiko (Van)

- Vanuatu won the toss and elected to field.
- Tsuyoshi Takada (Jpn) made his T20I debut.

28 July 2023
13:30
Scorecard

Papua New Guinea; 229/6 (20 overs)	v	Philippines; 129/7 (20 overs)
Tony Ura 61 (31); Liam Myott 2/42 (4 overs)		Daniel Smith 34 (20); Kabua Morea 2/32 (4 overs)

Papua New Guinea won by 100 runs
Amini Park, Port Moresby
Umpires: Phillip Gillespie (Aus) and Claire Polosak (Aus)
Player of the match: Tony Ura (PNG)

- Philippines won the toss and elected to field.
- Francis Walsh (Phi) made his T20I debut.

29 July 2023
09:00
Scorecard

Philippines; 94 (18.2 overs)	v	Vanuatu; 98/7 (16.1 overs)
Grant Russ 26 (28); Nalin Nipiko 3/28 (3.2 overs)		Nalin Nipiko 36* (39); Kepler Lukies 5/10 (4 overs)

Vanuatu won by 3 wickets
Amini Park, Port Moresby
Umpires: Alu Kapa (PNG) and Claire Polosak (Aus)
Player of the match: Kepler Lukies (Phi)

- Philippines won the toss and elected to bat.
- Kepler Lukies became the first bowler for Philippines to take a five-wicket haul in men's T20Is. At 16 years and 145 days old, he also became the youngest player to take a five-wicket haul in men's T20Is.

29 July 2023
13:30
Scorecard

Japan; 106/8 (20 overs)	v	Papua New Guinea; 109/4 (11.3 overs)
Reo Sakurano-Thomas 30 (36); Norman Vanua 4/20 (4 overs)		Tony Ura 47 (19); Kohei Kubota 3/11 (2 overs)

Papua New Guinea won by 6 wickets
Amini Park, Port Moresby
Umpires: Phillip Gillespie (Aus) and Shaun Haig (NZ)
Player of the match: Norman Vanua (PNG)

- Japan won the toss and elected to bat.
