= Vanuatuan cricket team in Malaysia in 2019–20 =

| | Malaysia | Vanuatu |
- Dates: 28 September – 4 October 2019
| Captains | Virandeep Singh | Andrew Mansale |

Twenty20 International series
- Results: Vanuatu won the 5-match series 3–2
| Most runs | Mohamed Arief (159) | Patrick Matautaava (197) |
| Most wickets | Pavandeep Singh (10) | Nalin Nipiko (9) |
- Player of the series: Nalin Nipiko (Van)

The Vanuatu cricket team toured Malaysia in September and October 2019 to play a five-match Twenty20 International (T20I) series. All the matches were played at the Kinrara Oval in Kuala Lumpur.

== Squads ==
| Malaysia | Vanuatu |
|---|---|
| Virandeep Singh (c); Nazril Rahman (vc); Muhammad Amir; Mohamed Arief; Anwar Arudin; Syed Aziz; Ainool Hafizs; Ainool Haqqiem; Syazrul Idrus; Sharvin Muniandy; Nazril Rahman; Fitri Sham; Pavandeep Singh; Vijay Unni; Muhammad Wafiq; Zubaidi Zulkifle | Andrew Mansale (c); Callum Blake; Jelany Chilia; Shane Deitz; Junior Kaltapau; Worford Kalworai; Trevor Langa; Patrick Matautaava; Williamsing Nalisa; Nalin Nipiko; Simpson Obed; Joshua Rasu; Zechariah Shem; Apolinaire Stephen; Ronald Tari; Clement Tommy; Jamal Vira; Wesley Viraliliu |

== Tour match ==
=== Twenty-over match: Malaysia A vs Vanuatu ===
28 September 2019
10:00
Scorecard

| Vanuatu; 159/7 (20 overs) | v | Malaysia A 161/3 (16.5 overs) |
| Joshua Rasu 66 (49); Sharvin Muniandy 3/33 (4 overs) | | Anwar Arudin 57 (29); Jelany Chilia 1/21 (4 overs) |

Malaysia A won by 7 wickets
Kinrara Oval, Kuala Lumpur

- Vanuatu won the toss and elected to bat.

== T20I series ==
=== 1st T20I ===
29 September 2019
10:00
Scorecard

| Vanuatu; 151/5 (20 overs) | v | Malaysia; 134/9 (20 overs) |
| Joshua Rasu 74 (54); Nazril Rahman 2/28 (4 overs) | | Mohamed Arief 33 (25); Nalin Nipiko 4/21 (4 overs) |

Vanuatu won by 17 runs
Kinrara Oval, Kuala Lumpur
Umpires: Izmir Azraf (Mas) and Denish Sevakumaran (Mas)
Player of the match: Joshua Rasu (Van)

- Vanuatu won the toss and elected to bat.
- Mohamed Arief, Ainool Haqqiem, Muhammad Wafiq and Zubaidi Zulkifle (Mas) all made their T20I debuts.
- At the age of 20 years and 190 days, Virandeep Singh (Mas) became the youngest male cricketer to captain a side in a T20I match.

=== 2nd T20I ===
1–2 October 2019
10:00
Scorecard

| Vanuatu; 188/6 (20 overs) | v | Malaysia; 137/7 (20 overs) |
| Patrick Matautaava 103 (52); Sharvin Muniandy 2/26 (4 overs) | | Virandeep Singh 34 (36); Simpson Obed 3/23 (4 overs) |

Vanuatu won by 51 runs
Kinrara Oval, Kuala Lumpur
Umpires: Rudy Ismandy (Mas) and Viswanadan Kalidas (Mas)
Player of the match: Patrick Matautaava (Van)

- Vanuatu won the toss and elected to bat.
- No play was possible on 1 October due to rain. Reserve day used.
- Ainool Hafizs and Syazrul Idrus (Mas) both made their T20I debuts.
- Patrick Matautaava became the first batsman for Vanuatu to score a century in T20Is.

=== 3rd T20I ===
2 October 2019
19:00 (D/N)
Scorecard

| Malaysia; 134/8 (20 overs) | v | Vanuatu; 108 (17.1 overs) |
| Sharvin Muniandy 27 (21); Nalin Nipiko 3/22 (4 overs) | | Nalin Nipiko 42 (30); Muhammad Wafiq 3/10 (4 overs) |

Malaysia won by 26 runs
Kinrara Oval, Kuala Lumpur
Umpires: Mathan Kumar (Mas) and Zaidan Taha (Mas)
Player of the match: Nalin Nipiko (Van)

- Malaysia won the toss and elected to bat.
- Apolinaire Stephen (Van) made his T20I debut.

=== 4th T20I ===
3 October 2019
14:45
Scorecard

| Malaysia; 144/7 (20 overs) | v | Vanuatu; 145/4 (19.1 overs) |
| Mohamed Arief 52* (31); Apolinaire Stephen 2/15 (4 overs) | | Joshua Rasu 50 (40); Sharvin Muniandy 2/18 (3 overs) |

Vanuatu won by 6 wickets
Kinrara Oval, Kuala Lumpur
Umpires: Rudy Ismandy (Mas) and Viswanadan Kalidas (Mas)
Player of the match: Joshua Rasu (Van)

- Malaysia won the toss and elected to bat.

=== 5th T20I ===
4 October 2019
19:00 (D/N)
Scorecard

| Malaysia; 206/4 (20 overs) | v | Vanuatu; 184/9 (20 overs) |
| Syed Aziz 87 (50); Nalin Nipiko 1/31 (3 overs) | | Patrick Matautaava 66 (29); Pavandeep Singh 3/32 (4 overs) |

Malaysia won by 22 runs
Kinrara Oval, Kuala Lumpur
Umpires: Rudy Ismandy (Mas) and Narayanan Sivan (Mas)
Player of the match: Syed Aziz (Mas)

- Malaysia won the toss and elected to bat.
- Muhammad Amir (Mas) and Trevor Langa (Van) made his T20I debut.
