= 2024 Malaysia Open T20 Championship =

Cricket tournament

- Dates: 5 – 11 March 2024
- Administrator: Malaysia Cricket Association
- Cricket format: Twenty20 International
- Tournament format(s): Round-robin and final
- Host: Malaysia
- Champions: Bahrain
- Runners-up: Malaysia
- Participants: 5
- Matches: 12
- Player of the series: (Malaysia) Virandeep Singh
- Most runs: (Bahrain) Sohail Ahmed (182)
- Most wickets: (Bahrain) Rizwan Butt (13)

The 2024 Malaysia Open T20 Championship was a Twenty20 International (T20I) cricket tournament that took place in Malaysia in March 2024. The tournament was contested by the men's national teams of Malaysia, Bahrain, Kuwait, Tanzania and Vanuatu. All five teams remained in Malaysia to play in this T20I tournament after taking part in the 2024 ICC Cricket World Cup Challenge League Play-off competition.

== Squads ==
Bahrain	Kuwait	Malaysia	Tanzania	Vanuatu
Haider Butt (c); Sohail Ahmed; Sarfaraz Ali; Imran Anwar; Junaid Aziz; Ahmer Bin Nisar (wk); Rizwan Butt; Ali Dawood; Abdul Majid Abbasi; Abdul Majid Malik; Ubaid Martuza (wk); Umer Toor (wk); Sathaiya Veerapathiran; Abdul Wahab	Mohammed Aslam (c); Usman Patel (vc, wk); Ilyas Ahmed; Mohammad Amin; Clinto Anto; Meet Bhavsar (wk); Adnan Idrees; Shiraz Khan; Yasin Patel; Shahrukh Quddus; Ravija Sandaruwan; Mohamed Shafeeq; Bilal Tahir	Ahmad Faiz (c); Syed Aziz (vc, wk); Muhammad Amir; Ainool Hafizs (wk); Rizwan Haider; Khizar Hayat; Sharvin Muniandy; Fitri Sham; Pavandeep Singh; Virandeep Singh; Muhamad Syahadat; Vijay Unni; Muhammad Wafiq; Zubaidi Zulkifle	Salum Jumbe (c); Sefu Athumani; Mohamed Issa; Abdallah Jabiri; Zamoyoni Jabeneke; Ally Kimote; Omary Kitunda (wk); Jumanne Masquater; Simba Mbaki; Kassim Nassoro; Yalinde Nkanya; Johnson Nyambo; Ivan Selemani; SanjayKumar Thakor	Joshua Rasu (c); Ronald Tari (vc); Jarryd Allan (wk); Tim Cutler; Junior Kaltapau; Andrew Mansale; Patrick Matautaava; Williamsing Nalisa; Nalin Nipiko; Simpson Obed; Apolinaire Stephen; Clement Tommy (wk); Jamal Vira (wk); Darren Wotu; Womejo Wotu

== Round-robin ==
=== Points table ===
Pos	Team	Pld	W	L	NR	Pts	NRR	Qualification
1	Bahrain	4	4	0	0	8	2.220	Advanced to the final
2	Malaysia	4	3	1	0	6	1.402	Advanced to the final
3	Kuwait	4	2	2	0	4	−0.010	Advanced to the 3rd place play-off
4	Vanuatu	4	1	3	0	2	−1.903	Advanced to the 3rd place play-off
5	Tanzania	4	0	4	0	0	−1.517	

Source: ESPNcricinfo

=== Fixtures ===
5 March 2024
09:45
Scorecard

Vanuatu; 128/5 (20 overs)	v	Tanzania; 119 (18 overs)
Andrew Mansale 61* (40); Ally Kimote 2/20 (4 overs)		Jumanne Masquater 29 (20); Williamsing Nalisa 3/15 (4 overs)

Vanuatu won by 9 runs
Bayuemas Oval, Pandamaran
Umpires: Tabarak Dar (HK) and Viswanadan Kalidas (Mas)
Player of the match: Andrew Mansale (Van)

- Tanzania won the toss and elected to field.
- Jumanne Masquater (Tan) and Tim Cutler (Van) both made their T20I debuts.

5 March 2024
13:45
Scorecard

Kuwait; 123 (19.4 overs)	v	Bahrain; 99/2 (12.4 overs)
Meet Bhavsar 50 (41); Sathaiya Veerapathiran 3/20 (2.4 overs)		Sarfaraz Ali 57 (41); Shiraz Khan 1/3 (1.4 overs)

Bahrain won by 28 runs (DLS method)
Bayuemas Oval, Pandamaran
Umpires: Nasir Ali (Mas) and Sarika Prasad (Sin)
Player of the match: Sarfaraz Ali (Bhr)

- Bahrain won the toss and elected to field.
- No further play was possible due to rain.

6 March 2024
09:45
Scorecard

Tanzania; 97/7 (20 overs)	v	Kuwait; 103/5 (17.1 overs)
Omary Kitunda 21 (18); Shiraz Khan 2/23 (4 overs); Yasin Patel 2/23 (4 overs)		Mohammed Aslam 51* (34); Salum Jumbe 2/13 (2 overs)

Kuwait won by 5 wickets
Bayuemas Oval, Pandamaran
Umpires: Nasir Ali (Mas) and Narayanan Sivan (Mas)
Player of the match: Mohammed Aslam (Kuw)

- Tanzania won the toss and elected to bat.
- Sefu Athumani (Tan) made his T20I debut.

6 March 2024
13:45
Scorecard

Malaysia; 148/7 (20 overs)	v	Vanuatu; 96/9 (20 overs)
Virandeep Singh 52 (36); Womejo Wotu 2/19 (3 overs)		Nalin Nipiko 34 (47); Virandeep Singh 2/17 (4 overs)

Malaysia won by 52 runs
Bayuemas Oval, Pandamaran
Umpires: Tabarak Dar (HK) and Sarika Prasad (Sin)
Player of the match: Virandeep Singh (Mas)

- Malaysia won the toss and elected to bat.

7 March 2024
09:45
Scorecard

Malaysia; 110/6 (20 overs)	v	Bahrain; 112/1 (16.5 overs)
Zubaidi Zulkifle 36 (33); Rizwan Butt 2/15 (4 overs)		Umer Toor 69* (52); Muhammad Amir 1/33 (3.5 overs)

Bahrain won by 9 wickets
Bayuemas Oval, Pandamaran
Umpires: Tabarak Dar (HK) and Sarika Prasad (Sin)
Player of the match: Umer Toor (Bhr)

- Bahrain won the toss and elected to field.

7 March 2024
13:45
Scorecard

Vanuatu; 102/7 (20 overs)	v	Kuwait; 105/2 (13.1 overs)
Joshua Rasu 35* (40); Mohamed Shafeeq 2/17 (4 overs)		Meet Bhavsar 40 (26); Womejo Wotu 1/18 (2 overs)

Kuwait won by 8 wickets
Bayuemas Oval, Pandamaran
Umpires: Nasir Ali (Mas) and Narayanan Sivan (Mas)
Player of the match: Mohamed Shafeeq (Kuw)

- Kuwait won the toss and elected to field.

9 March 2024
09:45
Scorecard

Kuwait; 87 (18.4 overs)	v	Malaysia; 88/3 (13.4 overs)
Yasin Patel 31 (33); Virandeep Singh 3/14 (2.4 overs)		Syed Aziz 59* (38); Nimish Latheef 2/19 (3.4 overs)

Malaysia won by 7 wickets
Bayuemas Oval, Pandamaran
Umpires: Tabarak Dar (HK) and Sarika Prasad (Sin)
Player of the match: Syed Aziz (Mas)

- Malaysia won the toss and elected to field.

9 March 2024
13:45
Scorecard

Bahrain; 135/8 (20 overs)	v	Tanzania; 83 (20 overs)
Sohail Ahmed 35 (33); Yalinde Nkanya 3/17 (4 overs)		Omary Kitunda 30 (43); Rizwan Butt 5/12 (4 overs)

Bahrain won by 52 runs
Bayuemas Oval, Pandamaran
Umpires: Viswanadan Kalidas (Mas) and Narayanan Sivan (Mas)
Player of the match: Rizwan Butt (Bhr)

- Tanzania won the toss and elected to field.

10 March 2024
09:45
Scorecard

Bahrain; 166/4 (20 overs)	v	Vanuatu; 110 (18.4 overs)
Sohail Ahmed 73* (51); Patrick Matautaava 1/10 (3 overs)		Joshua Rasu 24 (28); Sachin Kumar 4/40 (4 overs)

Bahrain won by 56 runs
Bayuemas Oval, Pandamaran
Umpires: Viswanadan Kalidas (Mas) and Narayanan Sivan (Mas)
Player of the match: Sohail Ahmed (Bhr)

- Bahrain won the toss and elected to bat.
- Ubaid Martuza (Bhr) made his T20I debut.

10 March 2024
09:45
Scorecard

Tanzania; 83 (18.2 overs)	v	Malaysia; 86/4 (14.4 overs)
Mohamed Issa 28* (27); Virandeep Singh 3/4 (2 overs)		Muhamad Syahadat 27* (31); Ally Kimote 2/17 (3 overs)

Malaysia won by 6 wickets
Bayuemas Oval, Pandamaran
Umpires: Tabarak Dar (HK) and Sarika Prasad (Sin)
Player of the match: Virandeep Singh (Mas)

- Tanzania won the toss and elected to bat.

== 3rd Place play-off ==
11 March 2024
09:45
Scorecard

Vanuatu; 106/7 (20 overs)	v	Kuwait; 109/3 (11.3 overs)
Patrick Matautaava 28 (30); Shiraz Khan 4/12 (4 overs)		Ravija Sandaruwan 35 (22); Joshua Rasu 2/23 (4 overs)

Kuwait won by 7 wickets
Bayuemas Oval, Pandamaran
Umpires: Viswanadan Kalidas (Mas) and Narayanan Sivan (Mas)
Player of the match: Shiraz Khan (Kuw)

- Kuwait won the toss and elected to field.

== Final ==
11 March 2024
13:45
Scorecard

Malaysia; 77/9 (20 overs)	v	Bahrain; 82/2 (15.4 overs)
Khizar Hayat 18* (23); Rizwan Butt 3/10 (4 overs)		Haider Butt 37* (38); Pavandeep Singh 1/8 (4 overs)

Bahrain won by 8 wickets
Bayuemas Oval, Pandamaran
Umpires: Tabarak Dar (HK) and Sarika Prasad (Sin)
Player of the match: Rizwan Butt (Mas)

- Malaysia won the toss and elected to bat.
