= 2023 Pacific Island Cricket Challenge =

International cricket tournament

The 2023 Pacific Island Cricket Challenge consisted of a men's Twenty20 International (T20I) and a women's Twenty20 International (WT20I) cricket tournament, that took place in Suva, Fiji, in March 2023.

Both events featured men's and women's national teams from Fiji, Papua New Guinea, Samoa and Vanuatu, as well as a team representing the Australia and New Zealand Army Corps (ANZAC), with all games played at Albert Park in Suva. Papua New Guinea entered an academy team in the men's tournament due to their senior side playing a Cricket World Cup League 2 series in Nepal. The event was sponsored by the Australian Defence Force and also saw representatives from other Pacific island nations such as the Cook Islands and New Caledonia take part in training sessions to help boost the standard of cricket across the region. The arrival of the Vanuatu teams was delayed by the impact of Cyclones Judy and Kevin on the country.

Papua New Guinea won both the men's and women's tournaments.

== Men's tournament ==
2023 Men's Pacific Island Cricket Challenge
- Dates: 11 – 18 March 2023
- Administrator(s): Australian Defence Force and Cricket Fiji
- Cricket format: Twenty20, Twenty20 International
- Tournament format(s): Round-robin and knockout
- Host: Fiji
- Champions: Papua New Guinea XI
- Runners-up: Vanuatu
- Participants: 5
- Matches: 14
- Player of the series: (Vanuatu) Nalin Nipiko
- Most runs: (Vanuatu) Nalin Nipiko (271)
- Most wickets: (Samoa) Timezeen Rapi (10)

=== Squads ===
| ANZAC Barbarians | Fiji | Papua New Guinea XI | Samoa | Vanuatu |
|---|---|---|---|---|
| Lewin Maladay (c, wk); Heet Amin; Simon Behl; Marc Chappel; Jackson Edwards; Samuel Fahy; Matthew Guest; Lachlan Johnson; Tom Lavender; Matthew Lyons; Shaun Montgomery; Samuel Pisel; William Schiwy; Steven Sheakey; Matthew Shean; Ricky Mace; Ian Smith | Jone Wesele (c) (Note: Jone Wesele was named as captain of the Fiji men's squad, but Peni Vuniwaqa captained the side.); Peni Vuniwaqa (vc); Noa Acawei; Josaia Baleicikobia; Metuisela Beitaki (wk); Eriki Biudole; Petero Cabebula; Peni Dakainivanua; Peni Kotoisuva; Villame Manakitoga; Delaimatuku Maraiwai; Sekove Ravoka; Uraia Sorovakatini (wk); Siteri Tabuisulu; Saimoni Tuitoga; Seru Tupou; Cakacaka Veretaki (wk); James Vuli | Jason Kila (c); Govea Airi; Malcolm Aporo; Michael Charlie; Mahuru Dai; Jack Gardner; Christopher Kilapat; Junior Morea; Vani Morea; Patrick Nou; Toa Nou; Aue Oru; Nosaina Pokana; Doko Rupa (wk); Lega Siaka; Travis Vuivagi | Sitanisilao Toutai (c); Matthew Faatea; Liuone Fereti; Afapene Ilaoa; Uala Kaisala (wk); Pasi Kalosi; Aoga Leutogi; Titi Lutau; Bondi Pita; Josef Pita; Timezeen Rapi; Paul Rarotoga; Darren Roache; Maene Tuilaepa; Peniall Zinck | Patrick Matautaava (c); Junior Kaltapau (vc); Tim Cutler; Roderick Lekai; Godfrey Mangau; Andrew Mansale; Nalin Nipiko; Simpson Obed; Joshua Rasu; Apolinaire Stephen; Ronald Tari; Clement Tommy (wk); Ala Viraliliu (wk); Darren Wotu; Womejo Wotu; Obed Yosef |

=== Round-robin ===
==== Points table ====
| Pos | Team | Pld | W | L | NR | Pts | NRR |
|---|---|---|---|---|---|---|---|
| 1 | Papua New Guinea XI | 4 | 3 | 1 | 0 | 6 | 1.516 |
| 2 | Vanuatu | 4 | 3 | 1 | 0 | 6 | 0.992 |
| 3 | ANZAC Barbarians | 4 | 2 | 2 | 0 | 4 | 1.249 |
| 4 | Fiji | 4 | 2 | 2 | 0 | 4 | −0.409 |
| 5 | Samoa | 4 | 0 | 4 | 0 | 0 | −3.188 |

Source: ESPNcricinfo

Qualified for the semi-finals

==== Fixtures ====
11 March 2023
10:00
Scorecard

| Fiji; 158/6 (20 overs) | v | ANZAC Barbarians; 131 (19.5 overs) |
| Peni Dakainivanua 51* (44); Marc Chappel 2/22 (2 overs) | | Lewin Maladay 33 (26); Peni Dakainivanua 3/14 (4 overs) |

Fiji won by 27 runs
Albert Park Ground 1, Suva
Umpires: Phillip Gillespie (Aus) and Iliesa McGoon (Fij)
Player of the match: Peni Dakainivanua (Fij)

- Fiji won the toss and elected to bat.

11 March 2023
14:00
Scorecard

| Papua New Guinea XI; 169/6 (20 overs) | v | Samoa; 115 (20 overs) |
| Lega Siaka 71 (45); Timezeen Rapi 2/28 (4 overs) | | Matthew Faatea 27 (34); Jack Gardner 3/18 (3 overs) |

Papua New Guinea XI won by 54 runs
Albert Park Ground 1, Suva
Umpires: Sean Campbell (Aus) and Temo Nambuka (Fij)
Player of the match: Lega Siaka (PNG)

- Samoa won the toss and elected to field.

13 March 2023
10:00
Scorecard

| Fiji; 132/4 (16 overs) | v | Papua New Guinea XI; 139/2 (14 overs) |
| Cakacaka Veretaki 54* (43); Jack Gardner 2/18 (4 overs) | | Lega Siaka 48* (24); Siteri Tabuisulu 2/26 (4 overs) |

Papua New Guinea XI won by 8 wickets (DLS method)
Albert Park Ground 1, Suva
Umpires: Jeremaia Ledua (Fij) and Mervyn McGoon (Fij)
Player of the match: Lega Siaka (PNG)

- Fiji won the toss and elected to bat.
- Papua New Guinea XI were set a revised target of 135 runs from 16 overs.

13 March 2023
14:00
Scorecard

| Vanuatu; 165/8 (20 overs) | v | Samoa; 148/9 (20 overs) |
| Ronald Tari 56 (40); Timezeen Rapi 3/18 (4 overs) | | Paul Rarotoga 56 (39); Simpson Obed 4/29 (4 overs) |

Vanuatu won by 17 runs
Albert Park Ground 1, Suva
Umpires: Sean Campbell (Aus) and Phillip Gillespie (Aus)
Player of the match: Ronald Tari (Van)

- Samoa won the toss and elected to field.
- Matthew Faatea, Liuone Fereti, Maletino Maiava, Bondi Pita, Josef Pita, Timezeen Rapi, Paul Rarotoga, Sitanisilao Toutai, Maene Tuilaepa (Sam) and Godfrey Mangau (Van) all made their T20I debuts.

14 March 2023
10:00
Scorecard

| ANZAC Barbarians; 151/8 (20 overs) | v | Vanuatu; 152/6 (19.5 overs) |
| Lewin Maladay 48 (26); Apolinaire Stephen 2/23 (4 overs) | | Nalin Nipiko 58 (30); Matthew Guest 2/20 (4 overs) |

Vanuatu won by 4 wickets
Albert Park Ground 1, Suva
Umpires: Iliesa McGoon (Fij) and Temo Nembuka (Fij)
Player of the match: Nalin Nipiko (Van)

- Vanuatu won the toss and elected to field.

14 March 2023
14:00
Scorecard

| Fiji; 205/5 (20 overs) | v | Samoa; 139 (19.1 overs) |
| Cakacaka Veretaki 60 (41); Darren Roache 1/27 (3 overs) | | Josef Pita 46 (39); Petero Cabebula 4/14 (3.1 overs) |

Fiji won by 66 runs
Albert Park Ground 1, Suva
Umpires: Phillip Gillespie (Aus) and Merielle Kenni (Van)
Player of the match: Cakacaka Veretaki (Fij)

- Fiji won the toss and elected to bat.
- Peni Dakainivanua, Peni Kotoisuva, Villame Manakitoga, Siteri Tabuisulu, Cakacaka Veretaki (Fij) and Aoga Leutogi (Sam) all made their T20I debuts.

15 March 2023
10:00
Scorecard

| ANZAC Barbarians; 172/9 (20 overs) | v | Samoa; 54 (12.3 overs) |
| Tom Lavender 87 (47); Timezeen Rapi 3/19 (4 overs) | | Darren Roache 10 (9); Matthew Shean 4/11 (4 overs) |

ANZAC Barbarians won by 118 runs
Albert Park Ground 1, Suva
Umpires: Jeremaia Ledua (Fij) and Temo Nambuka (Fij)
Player of the match: Tom Lavender (ANZAC)

- ANZAC Barbarians won the toss and elected to bat.

15 March 2023
14:00
Scorecard

| Vanuatu; 154/9 (20 overs) | v | Papua New Guinea XI; 155/3 (14.4 overs) |
| Junior Kaltapau 25 (26); Nosaina Pokana 2/18 (4 overs) | | Doko Rupa 76 (48); Joshua Rasu 2/32 (4 overs) |

Papua New Guinea XI won by 7 wickets
Albert Park Ground 1, Suva
Umpires: Tomakanute Ritawa (Cok) and Rana Stevens (NZ)
Player of the match: Doko Rupa (PNG)

- Vanuatu won the toss and elected to bat.

16 March 2023
10:00
Scorecard

| ANZAC Barbarians; 168/5 (20 overs) | v | Papua New Guinea XI; 157 (18.4 overs) |
| Simon Behl 52 (25); Mahuru Dai 2/31 (4 overs) | | Vani Morea 66 (41); William Schiwy 4/28 (3.4 overs) |

ANZAC Barbarians won by 11 runs
Albert Park Ground 1, Suva
Umpires: Iliesa McGoon (Fij) and Mervyn McGoon (Fij)
Player of the match: William Schiwy (ANZAC)

- Papua New Guinea XI won the toss and elected to field.

16 March 2023
14:00
Scorecard

| Vanuatu; 223/5 (20 overs) | v | Fiji; 121 (16.1 overs) |
| Nalin Nipiko 100 (49); Peni Kotoisuva 2/56 (4 overs) | | Saimoni Tuitoga 27 (31); Nalin Nipiko 3/34 (4 overs) |

Vanuatu won by 102 runs
Albert Park Ground 1, Suva
Umpires: Phillip Gillespie (Aus) and Tomakanute Ritawa (Cok)
Player of the match: Nalin Nipiko (Van)

- Fiji won the toss and elected to field.
- Uraia Sorovakatini, Saimoni Tuitoga (Fij) and Ala Viraliliu (Van) all made their T20I debuts.
- Nalin Nipiko (Van) scored his first century in T20Is.

=== Semi-finals ===
17 March 2023
10:00
Scorecard

| Vanuatu; 148/9 (20 overs) | v | Fiji; 122/9 (20 overs) |
| Junior Kaltapau 48 (34); Seru Tupou 3/6 (2 overs) | | Seru Tupou 30 (36); Joshua Rasu 2/14 (4 overs) |

Vanuatu won by 26 runs
Albert Park Ground 2, Suva
Umpires: Phillip Gillespie (Aus) and Rana Stevens (NZ)
Player of the match: Junior Kaltapau (Van)

- Vanuatu won the toss and elected to bat.

17 March 2023
14:00
Scorecard

| Papua New Guinea XI; 129/9 (20 overs) | v | Samoa; 71 (17.1 overs) |
| Toa Nou 28 (22); Sitanisilao Toutai 2/21 (3 overs) | | Darren Roache 13 (13); Toa Nou 2/2 (1.1 overs) |

Papua New Guinea XI won by 58 runs
Albert Park Ground 2, Suva
Umpires: Mervyn McGoon (Fij) and Tomakanute Ritawa (Cok)
Player of the match: Toa Nou (PNG)

- Samoa won the toss and elected to field.

=== Third-place play-off ===
18 March 2023
14:00
Scorecard

| Fiji; 156/6 (20 overs) | v | Samoa; 134/9 (20 overs) |
| Noa Acawei 48* (22); Afapene Ilaoa 2/28 (3 overs) | | Timezeen Rapi 28 (19); Peni Dakainivanua 4/32 (4 overs) |

Fiji won by 22 runs
Albert Park Ground 1, Suva
Umpires: Sean Campbell (Aus) and Rana Stevens (NZ)
Player of the match: Noa Acawei (Fij)

- Fiji won the toss and elected to bat.
- Afapene Ilaoa (Sam) made his T20I debut.

=== Final ===
18 March 2023
14:00
Scorecard

| Papua New Guinea XI; 134 (20 overs) | v | Vanuatu; 127/8 (20 overs) |
| Lega Siaka 58 (37); Tim Cutler 5/13 (4 overs) | | Nalin Nipiko 54 (38); Patrick Nou 3/14 (4 overs) |

Papua New Guinea XI won by 7 runs
Albert Park Ground 2, Suva
Umpires: Phillip Gillespie (Aus) and Mervyn McGoon (Fij)
Player of the match: Tim Cutler (Van)

- Papua New Guinea XI won the toss and elected to bat.

== Women's tournament ==
2023 Women's Pacific Island Cricket Challenge
- Dates: 11 – 18 March 2023
- Administrator(s): Australian Defence Force and Cricket Fiji
- Cricket format: Women's Twenty20, Twenty20 International
- Tournament format(s): Round-robin and knockout
- Host: Fiji
- Champions: Papua New Guinea
- Runners-up: Vanuatu
- Participants: 5
- Matches: 14
- Player of the series: (Vanuatu) Selina Solman
- Most runs: (Papua New Guinea) Tanya Ruma (177)
- Most wickets: (Papua New Guinea) Hollan Doriga (13)

=== Squads ===
| ANZAC Barbarians | Fiji | Papua New Guinea | Samoa | Vanuatu |
|---|---|---|---|---|
| Tayla Seymour (c); Amanda Bellamy; Kirsten Benzie; Meagan Campbell; Melissa Campbell (wk); Elizabeth Drake; Amanda Green; Jenn Harmon; Shannon Keil; Lauren Lennox; Zoe Livori; Olivia Mulvany; Dinusha Perera; Kristen Smith; Amy Wiseman; Lauren Woods; Natasha Wilson | Ruci Muriyalo (c); Ilisapeci Waqavakatoga (vc, wk); Sereima Adikula; Kiera Amoe; Melaia Biu; Akanisi Delai; Ilivema Eranavula (wk); Maeavhanisi Erasito (wk); Ana Gonerara; Ateca Kainoco; Cilia Lewatu; Lagakali Lomani; Akata Matanisiga; Abigail Raikatalau; Naomi Raikatalau; Mereani Rodan; Elizabeth Rokoro; Karalaini Vakuruivalu; Sulia Vuni; Macatacola Vuruna | Kaia Arua (c); Tanya Ruma (vc); Vicky Araa; Hollan Doriga; Kevau Frank; Sibona Jimmy; Ravina Oa; Erani Pokana; Pauke Siaka; Brenda Tau (wk); Henao Thomas; Geua Tom (wk); Isabel Toua; Naoani Vare | Kolotita Nonu (c); Florence Agaimalo; Ituniu Faleupolu; Taalili Iosefo; Ruth Johnston (wk); Ariota Kupito; Leitu Leong; Sarina Moe; Apolonia Polataivao; Jacinta Sanele; Angel Sootaga; Vicky Tafea; Salema Toomaga; Matile Uliao; Eleni Vaaetasi | Selina Solman (c); Alvina Chilia (vc); Rachel Andrew; Gillian Chilia (wk); Netty Chilia; Tina Kalosin; Valenta Langiatu; Theresa Mansale; Vicky Mansale; Marcelina Mete; Rayline Ova; Leimura Tastuki; Louise Tastuki; Maloni Vatoko |

=== Round-robin ===
==== Points table ====
| Pos | Team | Pld | W | L | NR | Pts | NRR |
|---|---|---|---|---|---|---|---|
| 1 | Papua New Guinea | 4 | 4 | 0 | 0 | 8 | 5.806 |
| 2 | Vanuatu | 4 | 3 | 1 | 0 | 6 | 1.044 |
| 3 | Fiji | 4 | 2 | 2 | 0 | 4 | −1.235 |
| 4 | Samoa | 4 | 1 | 3 | 0 | 2 | −2.389 |
| 5 | ANZAC Barbarians | 4 | 0 | 4 | 0 | 0 | −3.690 |

Source: ESPNcricinfo

Qualified for the semi-finals

==== Fixtures ====
11 March 2023
10:00
Scorecard

| Papua New Guinea; 195/1 (20 overs) | v | Samoa; 35 (15.4 overs) |
| Naoani Vare 70* (55); Salema Toomaga 1/11 (2 overs) | | Jacinta Sanele 10 (25); Ravina Oa 3/5 (2.4 overs) |

Papua New Guinea won by 160 runs
Albert Park Ground 2, Suva
Umpires: Jeremaia Ledua (Fij) and Tomakanute Ritawa (Cok)
Player of the match: Naoani Vare (PNG)

- Papua New Guinea won the toss and elected to bat.
- Ituniu Faleupolu, Vicky Tafea, Salema Toomaga and Matile Uliao (Sam) all made their WT20I debuts.

11 March 2023
14:00
Scorecard

| ANZAC Barbarians; 48 (12.2 overs) | v | Fiji; 50/2 (6.1 overs) |
| Elizabeth Drake 15 (16); Karalaini Vakuruivalu 3/10 (3 overs) | | Ruci Muriyalo 27* (19); Kirsten Benzie 2/8 (2 overs) |

Fiji won by 8 wickets
Albert Park Ground 2, Suva
Umpires: Mervyn McGoon (Fij) and Rana Stevens (NZ)
Player of the match: Ruci Muriyalo (Fij)

- Fiji won the toss and elected to field.

13 March 2023
10:00
Scorecard

| Vanuatu; 94/8 (15 overs) | v | Samoa; 74/5 (15 overs) |
| Rachel Andrew 42 (33); Taalili Iosefo 2/12 (2 overs) | | Taalili Iosefo 29 (18); Marcelina Mete 2/11 (3 overs) |

Vanuatu won by 21 runs (DLS method)
Albert Park Ground 2, Suva
Umpires: Iliesa McGoon (Fij) and Tomakanute Ritawa (Cok)
Player of the match: Rachel Andrew (Van)

- Vanuatu won the toss and elected to bat.
- Samoa were set a revised target of 96 runs from 15 overs due to rain.
- Gillian Chilia and Tina Kalosin (Van) both made their WT20I debuts.

13 March 2023
14:00
Scorecard

| Papua New Guinea; 157/3 (20 overs) | v | Fiji; 43/9 (20 overs) |
| Tanya Ruma 45* (35); Ana Gonerara 1/8 (2 overs) | | Karalaini Vakuruivalu 11* (40); Ravina Oa 2/9 (4 overs) |

Papua New Guinea won by 114 runs
Albert Park Ground 2, Suva
Umpires: Temo Nambuka (Fij) and Rana Stevens (NZ)
Player of the match: Sibona Jimmy (PNG)

- Fiji won the toss and elected to field.

14 March 2023
10:00
Scorecard

| Samoa; 89/9 (20 overs) | v | Fiji; 90/1 (15.5 overs) |
| Matile Uliao 15 (16); Ruci Muriyalo 3/17 (4 overs) | | Ruci Muriyalo 49* (47); Ariota Kupito 1/10 (1 overs) |

Fiji won by 9 wickets
Albert Park Ground 2, Suva
Umpires: Sean Campbell (Aus) and Tomakanute Ritawa (Cok)
Player of the match: Ruci Muriyalo (Fij)

- Fiji won the toss and elected to field.
- Cilia Lewatu (Fij) made her T20I debut.

14 March 2023
14:00
Scorecard

| Vanuatu; 158/5 (20 overs) | v | ANZAC Barbarians; 107/5 (20 overs) |
| Selina Solman 67* (51); Tayla Seymour 1/17 (2 overs) | | Jenn Harmon 25* (22); Netty Chilia 2/15 (4 overs) |

Vanuatu won by 51 runs
Albert Park Ground 2, Suva
Umpires: Jeremaia Ledua (Fij) and Mervyn McGoon (Fij)
Player of the match: Selina Solman (Van)

- Vanuatu won the toss and elected to bat.

15 March 2023
10:00
Scorecard

| Vanuatu; 64/8 (20 overs) | v | Papua New Guinea; 70/1 (9.1 overs) |
| Selina Solman 30 (36); Sibona Jimmy 2/7 (3 overs) | | Pauke Siaka 26* (22); Selina Solman 1/13 (2 overs) |

Papua New Guinea won by 9 wickets
Albert Park Ground 2, Suva
Umpires: Phillip Gillespie (Aus) and Mervyn McGoon (Fij)
Player of the match: Selina Solman (Van)

- Vanuatu won the toss and elected to bat.

15 March 2023
14:00
Scorecard

| ANZAC Barbarians; 84/7 (20 overs) | v | Samoa; 85/4 (13 overs) |
| Meagan Campbell 26 (30); Ariota Kupito 2/10 (3 overs) | | Florence Agaimalo 26* (31); Amanda Green 3/13 (3 overs) |

Samoa won by 6 wickets
Albert Park Ground 2, Suva
Umpires: Merielle Kenni (Van) and Iliesa McGoon (Fij)
Player of the match: Amanda Green (ANZAC)

- ANZAC Barbarians won the toss and elected to bat.

16 March 2023
10:00
Scorecard

| Fiji; 47/9 (20 overs) | v | Vanuatu; 48/3 (9.1 overs) |
| Ruci Muriyalo 16 (25); Valenta Langiatu 3/6 (4 overs) | | Rachel Andrew 14 (20); Ruci Muriyalo 1/6 (2.1 overs) |

Vanuatu won by 7 wickets
Albert Park Ground 2, Suva
Umpires: Sean Campbell (Aus) and Jeremaia Ledua (Fij)
Player of the match: Valenta Langiatu (Van)

- Vanuatu won the toss and elected to field.
- Mereani Rodan (Fij) made her WT20I debut.

16 March 2023
14:00
Scorecard

| ANZAC Barbarians; 74/8 (20 overs) | v | Papua New Guinea; 77/2 (9.3 overs) |
| Tayla Seymour 16 (33); Hollan Doriga 4/13 (3 overs) | | Naoani Vare 37* (32); Amy Wiseman 2/8 (2 overs) |

Papua New Guinea won by 8 wickets
Albert Park Ground 2, Suva
Umpires: Merielle Kenni (Van) and Rana Stevens (NZ)
Player of the match: Hollan Doriga (PNG)

- ANZAC Barbarians won the toss and elected to bat.

=== Semi-finals ===
17 March 2023
10:00
Scorecard

| Papua New Guinea; 132/6 (20 overs) | v | Samoa; 86/8 (20 overs) |
| Brenda Tau 57* (50); Taalili Iosefo 1/9 (2 overs) | | Florence Agaimalo 21 (29); Hollan Doriga 3/13 (3 overs) |

Papua New Guinea won by 46 runs
Albert Park Ground 1, Suva
Umpires: Sean Campbell (Aus) and Iliesa McGoon (Fij)
Player of the match: Brenda Tau (PNG)

- Papua New Guinea won the toss and elected to bat.
- Angel Sootaga (Sam) made her WT20I debut.

17 March 2023
14:00
Scorecard

| Fiji; 48 (16 overs) | v | Vanuatu; 49/4 (7.1 overs) |
| Ateca Kainoco 12 (20); Netty Chilia 3/7 (3 overs) | | Selina Solman 16 (16); Karalaini Vakuruivalu 3/22 (4 overs) |

Vanuatu won by 6 wickets
Albert Park Ground 1, Suva
Umpires: Merielle Kenni (Van) and Temo Nambuka (Fij)
Player of the match: Selina Solman (Van)

- Vanuatu won the toss and elected to field.

=== Third-place play-off ===
18 March 2023
10:00
Scorecard

| Samoa; 105/9 (20 overs) | v | Fiji; 49 (16 overs) |
| Kolotita Nonu 27 (43); Melaia Biu 3/19 (4 overs) | | Sulia Vuni 9 (11); Florence Agaimalo 3/7 (3 overs) |

Samoa won by 56 runs
Albert Park Ground 1, Suva
Umpires: Jeremaia Ledua (Fij) and Temo Nambuka (Fij)
Player of the match: Kolotita Nonu (Sam)

- Fiji won the toss and elected to field.
- Apolonia Polataivao (Sam) made her WT20I debut.

=== Final ===
18 March 2023
10:00
Scorecard

| Papua New Guinea; 132/7 (20 overs) | v | Vanuatu; 32 (9.3 overs) |
| Sibona Jimmy 37 (38); Marcelina Mete 3/26 (4 overs) | | Rayline Ova 7 (6); Vicky Araa 3/5 (2.3 overs) |

Papua New Guinea won by 100 runs
Albert Park Ground 2, Suva
Umpires: Merielle Kenni (Van) and Tomakanute Ritawa (Cok)
Player of the match: Sibona Jimmy (PNG)

- Vanuatu won the toss and elected to field.
- Louise Tastuki (Van) made her WT20I debut.
