= Cricket at the 2025 SEA Games – Men's tournament =

2025 SEA Games cricket event

The men's cricket tournament at the 2025 SEA Games in Thailand took place in Bangkok across two venues from 9 to 17 December 2025. The Games featured two medal events each for men's and women's cricket — T10 and T20. Five teams participated in the men's event across both the formats.

== Squads ==
| Indonesia | Malaysia | Philippines | Singapore | Thailand |
|---|---|---|---|---|
| Danilson Hawoe (c); Gede Arta; Ketut Artawan; Ferdinando Banunaek; Julang Dzulfikar; Kadek Gamantika; Andreas Hawoe; Dharma Kesuma (wk); Maxi Koda; Gede Priandana; Apriliandi Rahayu; Ahmad Ramdoni (wk); Anjar Tadarus; Gede Wiguna; Dewa Wiswi | Syed Aziz (c); Muhammad Haziq Aiman; Ainool Hafizs (wk); Muhammad Amir; Azri Azhar; Ahmad Faiz; Amir Khan; Aslam Khan; Sharvin Muniandy; Pavandeep Singh; Virandeep Singh; Muhamad Syahadat; Vijay Unni; Muhammad Wafiq; Zubaidi Zulkifle | Henry Tyler (c); Rhys Burinaga; Mark Doal; Josef Doctora; Andrew Donovan; Kshitij Khurana; Kepler Lukies; Mark Manalo; Miggy Podosky; Grant Russ (wk); Amanpreet Sirah; Daniel Smith; Christopher Stamp; Nivek Tanner; Jonathon Tuffin; Francis Walsh | Rezza Gaznavi (c); Mahiyu Bhatia; Aman Desai (wk); Atharva Gune; Girin Gune; Aslan Jafri; Neil Karnik; Vedant Nagpaul; Kannusami Sathish; Ishaan Sawney; Raoul Sharma; Chirag Shivakumar; Pranav Sudarshan; Daksh Tyagi; Sai Venugopal | Phiriyaphong Suanchuai (c, wk); Chaloemwong Chatphaisan; Sorawat Desungnoen; Anucha Kalasi; Sarawut Maliwan; Wiraphan Ngowhuad; Narawit Nuntarach; Chanchai Pengkumta; Satarut Rungrueang; Yodsak Saranonnakkun; Kamron Senamontree; Nopphon Senamontree; Kiatiwut Suttisan; Phanuphong Thongsa; Thanaphon Yotharat |

== T20 event ==
2025 SEA Games – Men's T20
- Dates: 9 – 13 December 2025
- Administrator: Southeast Asian Games Federation
- Cricket format: Twenty20 International
- Tournament format: Round-robin
- Host: Thailand
- Champions: Malaysia (1st title)
- Runners-up: Philippines
- Third place: Singapore
- Participants: 5
- Matches: 10
- Most runs: (Malaysia) Muhammad Haziq Aiman (176)
- Most wickets: (Malaysia) Syed Aziz (9) (Philippines) Kepler Lukies (9) (Thailand) Nopphon Senamontree (9)

=== Points table ===
| Pos | Team | Pld | W | L | NR | Pts | NRR | Final Result |
|---|---|---|---|---|---|---|---|---|
| 1 | Malaysia | 4 | 4 | 0 | 0 | 8 | 5.688 | Gold medal |
| 2 | Philippines | 4 | 3 | 1 | 0 | 6 | −0.208 | Silver medal |
| 3 | Singapore | 4 | 2 | 2 | 0 | 4 | −0.827 | Bronze medal |
| 4 | Indonesia | 4 | 1 | 3 | 0 | 2 | −1.877 | |
| 5 | Thailand (H) | 4 | 0 | 4 | 0 | 0 | −1.872 | |

Source: ESPNcricinfo
(H) Host

=== Fixtures ===
9 December 2025
09:00
Scorecard

| Thailand; 80/9 (20 overs) | v | Indonesia; 81/5 (16.2 overs) |
| Phanuphong Thongsa 18* (20); Ferdinando Banunaek 3/5 (4 overs) | | Gede Priandana 29 (28); Nopphon Senamontree 3/4 (4 overs) |

Indonesia won by 5 wickets
Terdthai Cricket Ground, Bangkok
Umpires: Viswanadan Kalidas (Mas) and Anand Natarajan (Sin)

- Indonesia won the toss and elected to field.

9 December 2025
13:30
Scorecard

| Malaysia; 201/9 (20 overs) | v | Philippines; 87/9 (20 overs) |
| Muhammad Haziq Aiman 113 (58); Rhys Burinaga 4/33 (4 overs) | | Miggy Podosky 16 (23); Syed Aziz 3/11 (4 overs) |

Malaysia won by 114 runs
Terdthai Cricket Ground, Bangkok
Umpires: Hardeep Jadeja (Sin) and Ashwani Kumar Rana (Tha)

- Philippines won the toss and elected to field.
- Muhammad Haziq Aiman (Mas) scored his maiden century in T20Is.

10 December 2025
09:00
Scorecard

| Indonesia; 75/9 (20 overs) | v | Malaysia; 78/3 (9 overs) |
| Gede Arta 18 (39); Muhammad Amir 3/7 (3 overs) | | Muhammad Haziq Aiman 37 (16); Ferdinando Banunaek 2/22 (4 overs) |

Malaysia won by 7 wickets
Terdthai Cricket Ground, Bangkok
Umpires: Anand Natarajan (Sin) and Ashwani Kumar Rana (Tha)

- Malaysia won the toss and elected to field.

10 December 2025
13:30
Scorecard

| Philippines; 145/9 (20 overs) | v | Singapore; 131/6 (20 overs) |
| Kepler Lukies 43 (25); Aslan Jafri 3/33 (4 overs) | | Rezza Gaznavi 44* (41); Kepler Lukies 2/28 (4 overs) |

Philippines won by 14 runs
Terdthai Cricket Ground, Bangkok
Umpires: Samad Akbar (Tha) and Viswanadan Kalidas (Mas)

- Philippines won the toss and elected to bat.

11 December 2025
09:00
Scorecard

| Singapore; 156/8 (20 overs) | v | Thailand; 152/9 (20 overs) |
| Sai Venugopal 37 (23); Kamron Senamontree 3/24 (4 overs) | | Ariya Sutthisan 73 (50); Kannusami Sathish 2/19 (4 overs) |

Singapore won by 4 runs
Terdthai Cricket Ground, Bangkok
Umpires: Viswanadan Kalidas (Mas) and Denish Sevakumaran (Mas)

- Thailand won the toss and elected to field.

11 December 2025
13:30
Scorecard

| Philippines; 182/5 (20 overs) | v | Indonesia; 104 (18.5 overs) |
| Daniel Smith 65 (23); Dewa Wiswi 1/9 (1 over) | | Ahmad Ramdoni 24 (30); Kepler Lukies 3/13 (3.5 overs) |

Philippines won by 78 runs
Terdthai Cricket Ground, Bangkok
Umpires: Loganathan Poobalan (Mas) and Senthil Kumar (Sin)

- Philippines won the toss and elected to bat.

12 December 2025
09:30
Scorecard

| Indonesia; 151/9 (20 overs) | v | Singapore; 155/7 (19.1 overs) |
| Gede Arta 32 (22); Aslan Jafri 3/17 (4 overs) | | Raoul Sharma 38* (20); Kadek Gamantika 3/26 (4 overs) |

Singapore won by 3 wickets
Terdthai Cricket Ground, Bangkok
Umpires: Viswanadan Kalidas (Mas) and Ashwani Kumar Rana (Tha)

- Singapore won the toss and elected to field.

12 December 2025
13:30
Scorecard

| Thailand; 62 (13.3 overs) | v | Malaysia; 67/2 (5.4 overs) |
| Kamron Senamontree 13* (9); Syed Aziz 3/6 (3.3 overs) | | Muhammad Haziq Aiman 22 (10); Chanchai Pengkumta 1/19 (1 over) |

Malaysia won by 8 wickets
Terdthai Cricket Ground, Bangkok
Umpires: Hardeep Jadeja (Sin) and Senthil Kumar (Sin)

- Malaysia won the toss and elected to field.

13 December 2025
09:00
Scorecard

| Thailand; 153/7 (20 overs) | v | Philippines; 156/9 (19.4 overs) |
| Chaloemwong Chatphaisan 32 (14); Kepler Lukies 4/20 (4 overs) | | Daniel Smith 41 (15); Nopphon Senamontree 4/19 (4 overs) |

Philippines won by 1 wicket
Terdthai Cricket Ground, Bangkok
Umpires: Viswanadan Kalidas (Mas) and Anand Natarajan (Sin)

- Philippines won the toss and elected to field.

13 December 2025
13:30
Scorecard

| Singapore; 110 (19.3 overs) | v | Malaysia; 111/4 (11.4 overs) |
| Raoul Sharma 24 (23); Pavandeep Singh 3/17 (4 overs) | | Virandeep Singh 65* (40); Daksh Tyagi 2/36 (3 overs) |

Malaysia won by 6 wickets
Terdthai Cricket Ground, Bangkok
Umpires: Samad Akbar (Tha) and Ashwani Kumar Rana (Tha)

- Singapore won the toss and elected to bat.

== T10 event ==
2025 SEA Games – Men's T10
- Dates: 15 – 17 December 2025
- Administrator: Southeast Asian Games Federation
- Cricket format: T10
- Tournament format(s): Round-robin and final
- Host: Thailand
- Champions: Malaysia (1st title)
- Runners-up: Philippines
- Third place: Singapore
- Participants: 5
- Matches: 11

=== Round-robin stage ===
==== Points table ====
| Pos | Team | Pld | W | L | NR | Pts | NRR | Final Result |
|---|---|---|---|---|---|---|---|---|
| 1 | Malaysia | 4 | 4 | 0 | 0 | 8 | 2.819 | Gold medal |
| 2 | Philippines | 4 | 2 | 2 | 0 | 4 | 0.230 | Silver medal |
| 3 | Singapore | 4 | 2 | 2 | 0 | 4 | −1.027 | Bronze medal |
| 4 | Indonesia | 4 | 1 | 3 | 0 | 2 | −0.977 | |
| 5 | Thailand (H) | 4 | 1 | 3 | 0 | 2 | −1.056 | |

(H) Host

==== Fixtures ====
15 December 2025
09:00
Scorecard

| Thailand; 70/7 (10 overs) | v | Indonesia; 71/3 (8.5 overs) |
| Sorawat Desungnoen 22 (10); Gede Arta 2/6 (2 overs); Ketut Artawan 2/6 (2 overs) | | Ahmad Ramdoni 28* (16); Sarawut Maliwan 2/31 (2 overs) |

Indonesia won by 7 wickets
Asian Institute of Technology Ground, Bangkok
Umpires: Hitesh Sharma (Phi) and Loganathan Poobalan (Mas)

- Indonesia won the toss and elected to field.

15 December 2025
11:00
Scorecard

| Philippines; 83/7 (10 overs) | v | Malaysia; 84/6 (9.5 overs) |
| Daniel Smith (27); Pavandeep Singh 2/9 (2 overs) | | Virandeep Singh 23* (18); Kepler Lukies 4/6 (2 overs) |

Malaysia won by 4 wickets
Asian Institute of Technology Ground, Bangkok
Umpires: Ashwani Kumar Rana (Tha) and Senthil Kumar (Sin)

- Philippines won the toss and elected to bat.

15 December 2025
13:00
Scorecard

| Singapore; 78/8 (10 overs) | v | Indonesia; 61/8 (10 overs) |
| Mahiyu Bhatia 34 (18); Gede Arta 3/15 (2 overs); Danilson Hawoe 3/15 (2 overs) | | Andreas Hawoe 12* (9); Chirag Shivakumar 2/9 (2 overs) |

Singapore won by 17 runs
Asian Institute of Technology Ground, Bangkok
Umpires: Peerawat Duangtip (Tha) and Denish Sevakumaran (Mas)

- Singapore won the toss and elected to bat.

15 December 2025
15:00
Scorecard

| Philippines; 87/4 (10 overs) | v | Thailand; 80/7 (10 overs) |
| Jonathon Tuffin 35* (12); Sarawut Maliwan 2/14 (2 overs) | | Narawit Nuntarach 35 (23); Kepler Lukies 2/10 (2 overs) |

Philippines won by 7 runs
Asian Institute of Technology Ground, Bangkok
Umpires: Aye Min Than (Mya) and Senthil Kumar (Sin)

- Thailand won the toss and elected to field.

16 December 2025
09:00
Scorecard

| Singapore; 73/8 (10 overs) | v | Malaysia; 74/3 (5.5 overs) |
| Aman Desai 45 (23); Virandeep Singh 3/5 (2 overs) | | Ahmad Faiz 55 (21); Daksh Tyagi 2/16 (1.5 overs) |

Malaysia won by 8 wickets
Asian Institute of Technology Ground, Bangkok
Umpires: Ashwani Kumar Rana (Tha) and Hitesh Sharma (Phi)

- Malaysia won the toss and elected to field.

16 December 2025
11:00
Scorecard

| Philippines; 104/8 (10 overs) | v | Indonesia; 93/7 (10 overs) |
| Daniel Smith 30 (13); Anjar Tadarus 2/11 (2 overs) | | Gede Arta 54 (34); Kepler Lukies 2/11 (2 overs) |

Philippines won by 11 runs
Asian Institute of Technology Ground, Bangkok
Umpires: Anand Natarajan (Sin) and Senthil Kumar (Sin)

- Indonesia won the toss and elected to field.

16 December 2025
13:30
Scorecard

| Thailand; 57/7 (10 overs) | v | Malaysia; 59/1 (5.3 overs) |
| Chaloemwong Chatphaisan 30 (27); Virandeep Singh 3/8 (2 overs) | | Ahmad Faiz 50* (21); Sarawut Maliwan 1/6 (2 overs) |

Malaysia won by 9 wickets
Asian Institute of Technology Ground, Bangkok
Umpires: Anwesh Bose (Idn) and Hardeep Jadeja (Sin)

- Malaysia won the toss and elected to field.

17 December 2025
09:00
Scorecard

| Philippines; 120/5 (10 overs) | v | Singapore; 123/4 (9.4 overs) |
| Andrew Donovan 43* (22); Neil Karnik 2/30 (2 overs) | | Kannusami Sathish 53 (25); Rhys Burinaga 3/23 (2 overs) |

Singapore won by 6 wickets
Terdthai Cricket Ground, Bangkok
Umpires: Samad Akbar (Tha) and Denish Sevakumaran (Mas)

- Philippines won the toss and elected to bat.

17 December 2025
11:00
Scorecard

| Indonesia; 61/8 (10 overs) | v | Malaysia; 65/3 (8 overs) |
| Ahmad Ramdoni 31 (22); Virandeep Singh 3/4 (2 overs) | | Muhammad Haziq Aiman 39 (21); Dewa Wiswi 2/12 (2 overs) |

Malaysia won by 7 wickets
Terdthai Cricket Ground, Bangkok
Umpires: Hardeep Jadeja (Sin) and Senthil Kumar (Sin)

- Malaysia won the toss and elected to field.

17 December 2025
13:30
Scorecard

| Singapore; 85/8 (10 overs) | v | Thailand; 91/2 (8.3 overs) |
| Mahiyu Bhatia 31 (13); Chanchai Pengkumta 2/12 (2 overs); Nopphon Senamontree 2/12 (2 overs) | | Sorawat Desungnoen 53* (21); Pranav Sudarshan 1/15 (2 overs); Daksh Tyagi 1/15 (2 overs) |

Thailand won by 8 wickets
Terdthai Cricket Ground, Bangkok
Umpires: Loganathan Poobalan (Mas) and Hitesh Sharma (Phi)

- Thailand won the toss and elected to field.
