= Dom Michael =

Cricketer

Personal information
- Full name: Dominic Peter Michael
- Born: 8 October 1987 (age 39); Brisbane, Queensland, Australia
- Batting: Left-handed
- Bowling: Right-arm medium
- Role: All-rounder

International information
- National side: Samoa (2018–)
- T20I debut (cap 7): 8 July 2019 v PNG
- Last T20I: 15 September 2022 v Fiji

Domestic team information
- Years: Team
- 2012/13–2012/14: Queensland
- 2013: Netherlands
- 2013/14: Brisbane Heat
- 2014/15–2015/16: Hobart Hurricanes
- 2014/15–2016/17: Tasmania

Career statistics
Competition	T20I	FC	LA	T20
Matches	10	17	25	14
Runs scored	250	659	796	250
Batting average	31.25	20.59	49.75	20.83
100s/50s	0/3	0/3	1/7	0/3
Top score	63*	97	100	63*
Balls bowled	62	282	108	62
Wickets	4	0	2	4
Bowling average	26.00	–	46.50	26.00
5 wickets in innings	0	–	0	0
10 wickets in match	0	–	0	0
Best bowling	2/37	–	1/13	2/37
Catches/stumpings	3/–	4/-	6/-	3/–
Medal record
Representing Samoa
Men's Cricket
Pacific Games
Bronze medal – third place	2019 Apia	Twenty20 International
- Source: ESPN CricInfo, 2 July 2025

Dominic Peter Michael (born 8 October 1987) is a Samoan-Australian cricketer. He has played international cricket for Samoa, and Australian domestic cricket for Tasmania and Queensland. He has also represented two Big Bash League franchises, the Brisbane Heat and the Hobart Hurricanes.

== Early life ==
Michael was born in Brisbane to a Greek Cypriot father and a Samoan mother.

== Domestic career ==
After appearances at under-19 and Futures League level, he made his senior debut for Queensland late in the 2012–13 season, playing two Sheffield Shield fixtures and one Ryobi One-Day Cup game. The holder of an EU passport through his father, Michael signed up as the Netherlands' overseas player for the 2013 Yorkshire Bank 40 tournament, an English domestic competition. He finished as the second leading run-scorer for the Netherlands, behind Wesley Barresi, and also found time to play three Second XI Championship matches for Kent.

Michael signed with the Brisbane Heat for the 2013–14 season, but his only match for the team came at the 2013 Champions League Twenty20 event in India, in which he scored a duck. He added another three Sheffield Shield matches for Queensland, but for the following season moved to Tasmania. Michael once again played only a single match for the state BBL franchise, the Hobart Hurricanes, but had more success in his Shield appearances for Tasmania. Against South Australia, he scored a maiden first-class half-century, 97 from 215 balls opening with Ed Cowan, which was followed by 52 against Victoria two matches later.

== International career ==
He was in Samoa's squad for Group A of the 2018–19 ICC World Twenty20 East Asia-Pacific Qualifier tournament. In the final match of the tournament, against Fiji, he scored 100 not out from 62 balls, and was named the man of the match. He finished the tournament as the leading run-scorer for Samoa, with 225 runs in six matches.

In June 2019, he was selected to represent the Samoa cricket team in the men's tournament at the 2019 Pacific Games. He made his Twenty20 International (T20I) debut against Papua New Guinea, on 8 July 2019.
