= Gilmour Kaltongga =

Vanuatuan cricketer (born 1997)

Personal information
- Born: 5 April 1997 (age 29)
- Batting: Right handed
- Bowling: Right-arm offbreak

International information
- National side: Vanuatu
- T20I debut (cap 4): 22 March 2019 v PNG
- Last T20I: 24 March 2019 v Philippines
- Source: Cricinfo, 24 March 2019

Gilmour Kaltongga (born 5 April 1997) is a Vanuatuan cricketer who plays for the Vanuatu cricket team. In March 2019, he was named in the Vanuatuan squad for the Regional Finals of the 2018–19 ICC T20 World Cup East Asia-Pacific Qualifier tournament. He made his Twenty20 International (T20I) debut against Papua New Guinea on 22 March 2019.

In June 2019, he was selected to represent the Vanuatu cricket team in the men's tournament at the 2019 Pacific Games.
