= 2018–19 Men's T20 World Cup EAP qualifier =

Cricket tournament

The 2018–19 ICC T20 World Cup East Asia-Pacific Qualifier was the tournament played in Fiji and Philippines as part of qualification process for the 2021 ICC T20 World Cup.

Twelve regional qualifiers were held by the International Cricket Council (ICC), with 62 teams (Note: Zambia were originally scheduled to compete in the Southern sub region group in the Africa Qualifier, but later withdrew.) competing during 2018 in five regions – Africa (3 groups), Americas (2), Asia (2), East Asia Pacific (2) and Europe (3). The top 25 sides from these progressed to five Regional Finals in 2019, with seven teams then going on to compete in the 2019 ICC T20 World Cup Qualifier, (Note: The United Arab Emirates initially qualified to the Asia Regional Final, but later automatically progressed to the qualifier tournament as the host.) along with the six lowest ranked sides from the ICC T20I Championship. In April 2018, the ICC granted full international status to Twenty20 men's matches played between member sides from 1 January 2019 onwards. Therefore, all the matches in the Regional Finals were played as Twenty20 Internationals (T20Is).

The top two teams in Group A, and the top team of Group B of the East Asia-Pacific Qualifier, progressed to the Regional Finals. Papua New Guinea won Group A, with Vanuatu finishing in second place to progress to the Finals. Group B was won by the Philippines. It was also the first ICC tournament to be held in the Philippines.

Papua New Guinea progressed to the T20 World Cup Qualifier after winning the Regional Finals, held in Papua New Guinea in March 2019.

== Teams ==
Group A	Group B
Fiji; Papua New Guinea; Samoa; Vanuatu	Indonesia; Japan; Philippines; South Korea

== Group A ==
East Asia-Pacific Sub Regional Qualifier (Group A)
- Dates: 25 – 29 August 2018
- Administrator: ICC East Asia-Pacific
- Cricket format: T20
- Tournament format: Double round-robin
- Host: Fiji
- Champions: Papua New Guinea
- Participants: 4
- Matches: 12
- Most runs: (Papua New Guinea) Assad Vala (294)
- Most wickets: (Vanuatu) Callum Blake (11) (Samoa) Sean Solia (11)

Group A matches were held in Fiji from 25 to 29 August 2018, with the top two teams progressing to the Regional Final.

=== Points table ===
Team	Pld	W	L	T	NR	Pts	NRR	Status
Papua New Guinea (Q)	6	6	0	0	0	12	+3.712	Advanced to Regional Finals
Vanuatu (Q)	6	2	4	0	0	4	+0.209	Advanced to Regional Finals
Samoa	6	2	4	0	0	4	–1.488	
Fiji (H)	6	2	4	0	0	4	–2.270	

(H) Host, (Q) Qualified to regional finals

=== Fixtures ===
25 August 2018
09:30
Scorecard

Vanuatu; 143/9 (20 overs)	v	Fiji; 145/7 (20 overs)
Nalin Nipiko 47 (42); Kitiano Tavo 3/19 (4 overs)		Metuisela Beitaki 52 (31); Patrick Matautaava 2/23 (4 overs)

Fiji won by 3 wickets
Albert Park Ground 1, Suva
Umpires: Alu Kapa (PNG) and Hitesh Sharma (Phi)
Player of the match: Metuisela Beitaki (Fij)

- Fiji won the toss and elected to field.

25 August 2018
09:30
Scorecard

Papua New Guinea; 209/8 (20 overs)	v	Samoa; 129/7 (20 overs)
Tony Ura 120 (55); Naa Vaasili 2/8 (1 over)		Sean Solia 39 (30); Chad Soper 4/10 (4 overs)

Papua New Guinea won by 80 runs
Albert Park Ground 2, Suva
Umpires: Kim Cotton (NZ) and Mervyn McGoon (Fij)
Player of the match: Tony Ura (PNG)

- Papua New Guinea won the toss and elected to bat.

25 August 2018
13:30
Scorecard

Papua New Guinea; 188/8 (20 overs)	v	Fiji; 113/9 (20 overs)
Assad Vala 70 (41); Jikoi Kida 3/23 (3 overs)		Seru Tupou 46 (37); Norman Vanua 3/18 (4 overs)

Papua New Guinea won by 75 runs
Albert Park Ground 1, Suva
Umpires: Kim Cotton (NZ) and Bri Olewale (PNG)
Player of the match: Assad Vala (PNG)

- Fiji won the toss and elected to field.

25 August 2018
13:30
Scorecard

Samoa; 144/6 (20 overs)	v	Vanuatu; 127 (19 overs)
Benjamin Mailata 57 (38); Nalin Nipiko 4/37 (4 overs)		Joshua Rasu 52 (31); Lester Evile 4/8 (4 overs)

Samoa won by 17 runs
Albert Park Ground 2, Suva
Umpires: Alu Kapa (PNG) and Mervyn McGoon (Fij)
Player of the match: Benjamin Mailata (Sam)

- Vanuatu won the toss and elected to field.

27 August 2018
09:30
Scorecard

Fiji; 139/8 (20 overs)	v	Samoa; 130/7 (20 overs)
Peni Vuniwaqa 27 (22); Naa Vaasili 2/20 (2 overs)		Andrew Michael 52 (57); Tukana Tavo 2/27 (4 overs)

Fiji won by 9 runs
Albert Park Ground 1, Suva
Umpires: Bri Olewale (PNG) and Hitesh Sharma (Phi)
Player of the match: Andrew Michael (Sam)

- Samoa won the toss and elected to field.

27 August 2018
09:30
Scorecard

Papua New Guinea; 239/2 (20 overs)	v	Vanuatu; 158 (19.1 overs)
Assad Vala 110 (50); Andrew Mansale 1/34 (4 overs)		Nalin Nipiko 84 (53); Chad Soper 4/22 (4 overs)

Papua New Guinea won by 81 runs
Albert Park Ground 2, Suva
Umpires: Kim Cotton (NZ) and Alu Kapa (PNG)
Player of the match: Assad Vala (PNG)

- Vanuatu won the toss and elected to field.

28 August 2018
09:30
Scorecard

Samoa; 175/4 (20 overs)	v	Papua New Guinea; 180/3 (18 overs)
Dom Michael 83 (61); John Reva 2/23 (3 overs)		Assad Vala 65 (41); Sean Solia 1/30 (3 overs)

Papua New Guinea won by 7 wickets
Albert Park Ground 1, Suva
Umpires: Mervyn McGoon (Fij) and Bri Olewale (PNG)
Player of the match: Dom Michael (Sam)

- Samoa won the toss and elected to bat.

28 August 2018
09:30
Scorecard

Vanuatu; 158/8 (20 overs)	v	Fiji; 121/9 (20 overs)
Joshua Rasu 91 (53); Kitiano Tavo 2/21 (4 overs)		Metuisela Beitaki 27 (21); Callum Blake 4/10 (4 overs)

Vanuatu won by 37 runs
Albert Park Ground 2, Suva
Umpires: Kim Cotton (NZ) and Hitesh Sharma (Phi)
Player of the match: Joshua Rasu (Van)

- Fiji won the toss and elected to field.

28 August 2018
13:30
Scorecard

Samoa; 68 (16.2 overs)	v	Vanuatu; 72/1 (7.2 overs)
Naa Vaasili 16* (20); Apolinaire Stephen 3/25 (4 overs)		Patrick Matautaava 30 (15); Sean Solia 1/14 (2 overs)

Vanuatu won by 9 wickets
Albert Park Ground 1, Suva
Umpires: Alu Kapa (PNG) and Mervyn McGoon (Fij)
Player of the match: Patrick Matautaava (Van)

- Samoa won the toss and elected to bat.

28 August 2018
13:30
Scorecard

Fiji; 31 (12.5 overs)	v	Papua New Guinea; 35/2 (3.2 overs)
Peni Vuniwaqa 11 (17); Charles Amini 4/1 (3 overs)		Lega Siaka 15 (5); Viliame Yabaki 1/16 (2 overs)

Papua New Guinea won by 8 wickets
Albert Park Ground 2, Suva
Umpires: Bri Olewale (PNG) and Hitesh Sharma (Phi)
Player of the match: Charles Amini (PNG)

- Fiji won the toss and elected to bat.

29 August 2018
13:30
Scorecard

Vanuatu; 145/9 (20 overs)	v	Papua New Guinea; 146/8 (18.4 overs)
Jamal Vira 39 (25); Assad Vala 4/25 (4 overs)		Jason Kila 41 (25); Patrick Matautaava 3/27 (4 overs)

Papua New Guinea won by 2 wickets
Albert Park Ground 1, Suva
Umpires: Mervyn McGoon (Fij) and Hitesh Sharma (Phi)
Player of the match: Assad Vala (PNG)

- Vanuatu won the toss and elected to bat.

29 August 2018
13:30
Scorecard

Fiji; 163/6 (20 overs)	v	Samoa; 165/1 (16.3 overs)
Metuisela Beitaki 91 (66); Sean Solia 2/14 (4 overs)		Dom Michael 100* (62); Peni Vuniwaqa 1/8 (1 over)

Samoa won by 9 wickets
Albert Park Ground 2, Suva
Umpires: Kim Cotton (NZ) and Alu Kapa (PNG)
Player of the match: Dom Michael (Sam)

- Samoa won the toss and elected to field.

== Group B ==
East Asia-Pacific Sub Regional Qualifier (Group B)
- Dates: 1 – 7 December 2018
- Administrator: ICC East Asia-Pacific
- Cricket format: T20
- Tournament format: Double round-robin
- Host: Philippines
- Champions: Philippines
- Participants: 4
- Matches: 12
- Most runs: (South Korea) Muhammad Nadeem (195)
- Most wickets: (Philippines) Surinder Singh (12)

Group B was held at Friendship Oval at Emilio Aguinaldo College in Dasmariñas, Philippines from 1 to 7 December 2018. The top team progressed to the Regional Finals.

=== Points table ===
Team	Pld	W	L	T	NR	Pts	NRR	Status
Philippines (H,Q)	6	5	1	0	0	10	+0.325	Advance to Regional Finals
South Korea	6	3	3	0	0	6	+0.263	
Japan	6	3	3	0	0	6	+0.099	
Indonesia	6	1	5	0	0	2	–0.677	

(H) Host, (Q) Qualified to regional finals

=== Fixtures ===
1 December 2018
9:15
Scorecard

Japan; 136/5 (20 overs)	v	Indonesia; 124 (19.3 overs)
Tomoki Ota 39* (19); Ahmad Mushtaq 1/13 (2 overs)		Muhaddis 37 (28); Rui Matsumura 4/18 (3.3 overs)

Japan won by 12 runs
Friendship Oval, Dasmariñas
Umpires: Bri Olewale (PNG) and Hitesh Sharma (Phi)
Player of the match: Tomoki Ota (Jpn)

- Japan won the toss and elected to bat.

1 December 2018
13:45
Scorecard

Philippines; 154/8 (20 overs)	v	South Korea; 148 (19.5 overs)
Haider Kiani 36 (32); Park Keunyeol 3/26 (4 overs)		Jun Hyunwoo 42 (31); Surinder Singh 4/23 (4 overs)

Philippines won by 6 runs
Friendship Oval, Dasmariñas
Umpires: Nathan Johnstone (Aus) and Suresh Subramanian (Idn)
Player of the match: Surinder Singh (Phi)

- South Korea won the toss and elected to field.

2 December 2018
9:30
Scorecard

South Korea; 139/7 (20 overs)	v	Indonesia; 132/7 (20 overs)
Mudassir Iqbal 36 (30); Kirubasankar Ramamoorthy 4/10 (4 overs)		Kadek Gamantika 71* (57); Choi Jiwon 3/22 (4 overs)

South Korea won by 7 runs
Friendship Oval, Dasmariñas
Umpires: Nathan Johnstone (Aus) and Hitesh Sharma (Phi)
Player of the match: Kadek Gamantika (Idn)

- South Korea won the toss and elected to bat.

2 December 2018
13:45
Scorecard

Japan; 157/5 (20 overs)	v	Philippines; 152/6 (20 overs)
Makoto Taniyama 61 (50); Grant Russ 2/17 (3 overs)		Machanda Biddappa 51* (48); Rui Matsumura 2/24 (4 overs)

Japan won by 5 runs
Friendship Oval, Dasmariñas
Umpires: Bri Olewale (PNG) and Suresh Subramanian (Idn)
Player of the match: Makoto Taniyama (Jpn)

- Japan won the toss and elected to bat.

3 December 2018
9:30
Scorecard

Philippines; 156 (19.5 overs)	v	Indonesia; 153/6 (20 overs)
Jonathan Hill 62 (32); Anjar Tadarus 5/32 (3.5 overs)		Kirubasankar Ramamoorthy 56 (43); Surinder Singh 2/14 (4 overs)

Philippines won by 3 runs
Friendship Oval, Dasmariñas
Umpires: Nathan Johnstone (Aus) and Bri Olewale (PNG)
Player of the match: Anjar Tadarus (Idn)

- Philippines won the toss and elected to bat.

3 December 2018
13:45
Scorecard

South Korea; 145/9 (20 overs)	v	Japan; 149/4 (17.3 overs)
Muhammad Nadeem 34* (18); Makoto Taniyama 3/18 (3 overs)		Masaomi Kobayashi 50 (30); Muhammad Nadeem 3/33 (3.3 overs)

Japan won by 6 wickets
Friendship Oval, Dasmariñas
Umpires: Hitesh Sharma (Phi) and Suresh Subramanian (Idn)
Player of the match: Makoto Taniyama (Jpn)

- South Korea won the toss and elected to bat.

5 December 2018
9:30
Scorecard

Philippines; 103 (17.5 overs)	v	South Korea; 99 (19.1 overs)
Jonathan Hill 23 (27); Mudassir Iqbal 4/20 (3.5 overs)		Muhammad Nadeem 38 (29); Surinder Singh 3/17 (4 overs)

Philippines won by 4 runs
Friendship Oval, Dasmariñas
Umpires: Hitesh Sharma (Phi) and Suresh Subramanian (Idn)
Player of the match: Surinder Singh (Phi)

- Philippines won the toss and elected to bat.

5 December 2018
13:45
Scorecard

Japan; 100 (18 overs)	v	Indonesia; 101/6 (19.5 overs)
Kohei Wakita 18 (21); Gede Arta 4/20 (4 overs)		Kadek Gamantika 26 (30); Mian Siddique 2/23 (4 overs)

Indonesia won by 4 wickets
Friendship Oval, Dasmariñas
Umpires: Nathan Johnstone (Aus) and Bri Olewale (PNG)
Player of the match: Gede Arta (Idn)

- Japan won the toss and elected to bat.

6 December 2018
9:30
Scorecard

Philippines; 118/9 (20 overs)	v	Japan; 115/9 (20 overs)
Henry Tyler 30 (28); Kazumasa Takahashi 3/14 (4 overs)		Kohei Wakita 19* (15); Vimal Kumar 3/14 (4 overs)

Philippines won by 3 runs
Friendship Oval, Dasmariñas
Umpires: Bri Olewale (PNG) and Hitesh Sharma (Phi)
Player of the match: Vimal Kumar (Phi)

- Philippines won the toss and elected to bat.

6 December 2018
13:45
Scorecard

Indonesia; 72 (17.5 overs)	v	South Korea; 73/4 (15 overs)
Arya Pastika 12 (17); Mudassir Iqbal 3/14 (4 overs)		Nishat Sakib 32* (45); Maxi Koda 2/22 (4 overs)

South Korea won by 6 wickets
Friendship Oval, Dasmariñas
Umpires: Nathan Johnstone (Aus) and Suresh Subramanian (Idn)
Player of the match: Mudassir Iqbal (Kor)

- Indonesia won the toss and elected to bat.

7 December 2018
9:30
Scorecard

Japan; 127/8 (20 overs)	v	South Korea; 128/6 (17 overs)
Raheel Kano 48 (54); Park Keunyeol 3/24 (4 overs)		Muhammad Nadeem 68 (32); Rui Matsumura 3/13 (4 overs)

South Korea won by 4 wickets
Friendship Oval, Dasmariñas
Umpires: Nathan Johnstone (Aus) and Hitesh Sharma (Phi)
Player of the match: Muhammad Nadeem (Kor)

- South Korea won the toss and elected to field.

7 December 2018
13:45
Scorecard

Philippines; 138/6 (20 overs)	v	Indonesia; 110 (18.2 overs)
Karweng Ng 54 (40); Anjar Tadarus 3/12 (3 overs)		Kadek Gamantika 48 (40); Tariq Ali 2/17 (4 overs)

Philippines won by 28 runs
Friendship Oval, Dasmariñas
Umpires: Bri Olewale (PNG) and Suresh Subramanian (Idn)
Player of the match: Karweng Ng (Phi)

- Indonesia won the toss and elected to field.

== Regional Finals ==
The Regional Finals were held in Papua New Guinea from 22 to 24 March 2019. Following the effects of Cyclone Trevor, fixtures on the opening two days could not be played due to a waterlogged pitch, so the schedule was rearranged. On the first day of fixtures, Papua New Guinea won their two matches, both by large margins. Before the last day of matches, Papua New Guinea and Vanuatu were both in contention to win the group, with the Philippines being eliminated. On the last day of fixtures, Papua New Guinea won the group to advance to the 2019 ICC T20 World Cup Qualifier, with Vanuatu being eliminated after losing against the Philippines. Nalin Nipiko of Vanuatu was named the Player of the Tournament.

ICC T20 World Cup East-Asia Pacific Regional Finals Qualifier
- Dates: 22 – 24 March 2019
- Administrator: ICC East Asia-Pacific
- Cricket format: Twenty20 International
- Tournament format: Double round-robin
- Host: Papua New Guinea
- Champions: Papua New Guinea
- Participants: 3
- Matches: 6
- Player of the series: (Vanuatu) Nalin Nipiko
- Most runs: (Papua New Guinea) Tony Ura (243)
- Most wickets: (Papua New Guinea) Lega Siaka (7)

Qualified Teams
Group A	Papua New Guinea
Group A	Vanuatu
Group B	Philippines

=== Points table ===
Pos	Team	Pld	W	L	T	NR	Pts	NRR	
1	Papua New Guinea (H)	4	3	0	0	1	7	5.499	Qualify to Global Qualifier
2	Philippines	4	1	2	0	1	3	−4.133	
3	Vanuatu	4	1	3	0	0	2	−1.063	

(H) Host

=== Fixtures ===
22 March 2019
09:30
Scorecard

Papua New Guinea; 216/4 (20 overs)	v	Philippines; 83/8 (20 overs)
Assad Vala 68 (39); Jonathan Hill 2/27 (3 overs)		Haider Kiani 13 (17); Chad Soper 2/6 (2 overs)

Papua New Guinea won by 133 runs
Amini Park, Port Moresby
Umpires: Simon Fry (Aus) and Viswanadan Kalidas (Mas)
Player of the match: Assad Vala (PNG)

- Philippines won the toss and elected to field.
- Kiplin Doriga, Jason Kila, Damien Ravu (PNG), Machanda Biddappa, Richard Goodwin, Jonathan Hill, Haider Kiani, Ruchir Mahajan, Karweng NG, Grant Russ, Kuldeep Singh, Surinder Singh, Daniel Smith and Henry Tyler (Phi) all made their T20I debuts.

22 March 2019
13:45
Scorecard

Vanuatu; 124/6 (20 overs)	v	Papua New Guinea; 125/2 (15.2 overs)
Nalin Nipiko 53 (55); Lega Siaka 2/7 (2 overs)		Tony Ura 65 (37); Williamsing Nalisa 1/29 (4 overs)

Papua New Guinea won by 8 wickets
Amini Park, Port Moresby
Umpires: Tabarak Dar (HK) and Simon Fry (Aus)
Player of the match: Tony Ura (PNG)

- Vanuatu won the toss and elected to bat.
- Callum Blake, Jelany Chilia, Jonathon Dunn, Gilmour Kaltongga, Andrew Mansale, Williamsing Nalisa, Nalin Nipiko, Simpson Obed, Joshua Rasu, Ronald Tari and Jamal Vira (Van) all made their T20I debuts.

23 March 2019
09:30
Scorecard

Vanuatu; 156/6 (20 overs)	v	Philippines; 93/7 (20 overs)
Nalin Nipiko 62 (57); Surinder Singh 3/32 (4 overs)		Machanda Biddappa 22* (22); Nalin Nipiko 2/16 (3 overs)

Vanuatu won by 63 runs
Amini Park, Port Moresby
Umpires: Tabarak Dar (HK) and Alu Kapa (PNG)

- Vanuatu won the toss and elected to bat.
- Jason Long (Phi) made his T20I debut.

23 March 2019
13:45
Scorecard

Papua New Guinea; 205/2 (20 overs)	v	Philippines; 11/2 (2 overs)
Tony Ura 107* (60); Jason Long 1/26 (2 overs)		Daniel Smith 5* (4); Sese Bau 2/4 (1 over)

No result
Amini Park, Port Moresby
Umpires: Viswanadan Kalidas (Mas) and Alu Kapa (PNG)

- Papua New Guinea won the toss and elected to bat.
- No further play was possible due to rain.
- Vimal Kumar (Phi) made his T20I debut.
- Tony Ura became the first batsman for Papua New Guinea to score a century in T20Is.

24 March 2019
09:30
Scorecard

Philippines; 46/3 (5 overs)	v	Vanuatu; 36/2 (5 overs)
Daniel Smith 22 (15); Nalin Nipiko 3/16 (2 overs)		Joshua Rasu 24 (19); Daniel Smith 1/8 (2 overs)

Philippines won by 10 runs
Amini Park, Port Moresby
Umpires: Simon Fry (Aus) and Alu Kapa (PNG)
Player of the match: Daniel Smith (Phi)

- Vanuatu won the toss and elected to field.
- The match was reduced to 5 overs per side due to rain.
- Zechariah Shem and Clement Tommy (Van) both made their T20I debuts.

24 March 2019
13:45
Scorecard

Vanuatu; 56/8 (13 overs)	v	Papua New Guinea; 60/0 (3 overs)
Andrew Mansale 10 (11); Lega Siaka 3/16 (3 overs)		Norman Vanua 29* (10)

Papua New Guinea won by 10 wickets
Amini Park, Port Moresby
Umpires: Tabarak Dar (HK) and Viswanadan Kalidas (Mas)
Player of the match: Lega Siaka (PNG)

- Vanuatu won the toss and elected to bat.
- The match was reduced to 13 overs per side due to rain.
- Wesley Viraliliu (Van) made his T20I debut.
