= Scottish cricket team against Papua New Guinea in the UAE in 2017–18 =

Scottish cricket team against PNG in 2017–18
	Papua New Guinea	Scotland
- Dates: 24 – 25 November 2017
Captains	Assad Vala	Kyle Coetzer

One Day International series
- Results: Scotland won the 2-match series 2–0
Most runs	Assad Vala (50)	Kyle Coetzer (95)
Most wickets	John Reva (3); Chad Soper (3)	Mark Watt (5)

The Scotland cricket team toured the United Arab Emirates in November 2017 to play two One Day Internationals (ODIs) against the Papua New Guinea cricket team. Scotland won the series 2–0.

== Squads ==
Papua New Guinea	Scotland
Assad Vala (c); Dogodo Bau; Sese Bau; Mahuru Dai; Kiplin Doriga; Alei Nao; Nosaina Pokana; Damien Ravu; John Reva; Lega Siaka; Chad Soper; Tony Ura; Norman Vanua; Jack Vare	Kyle Coetzer (c); Con de Lange (vc); Richie Berrington; Matthew Cross (wk); Michael English; Alasdair Evans; Michael Leask; Calum MacLeod; George Munsey; Mitchell Rao; Elliot Ruthven; Safyaan Sharif; Craig Wallace; Mark Watt

== ODI series ==
=== 1st ODI ===
24 November 2017
09:30
Scorecard

Papua New Guinea; 147 (44.2 overs)	v	Scotland; 148/4 (38.1 overs)
Assad Vala 40 (78); Safyaan Sharif 4/38 (8 overs)		Calum MacLeod 60* (92); Mahuru Dai 2/35 (10 overs)

Scotland won by 6 wickets
Dubai International Cricket Stadium, Dubai
Umpires: Alu Kapa (PNG) and Nitin Menon (Ind)
Player of the match: Calum MacLeod (Sco)

- Scotland won the toss and elected to field.
- Kiplin Doriga (PNG) made his ODI debut.
- Alu Kapa (PNG) stood in his first ODI as an umpire.

=== 2nd ODI ===
25 November 2017
09:30
Scorecard

Papua New Guinea; 192/8 (50 overs)	v	Scotland; 196/6 (46.2 overs)
Sese Bau 41 (59); Mark Watt 3/21 (10 overs)		Kyle Coetzer 66 (85); John Reva 3/40 (9.2 overs)

Scotland won by 4 wickets
Dubai International Cricket Stadium, Dubai
Umpires: Allan Haggo (Sco) and Nitin Menon (Ind)
Player of the match: Kyle Coetzer (Sco)

- Scotland won the toss and elected to field.
- Damien Ravu (PNG) made his ODI debut.
