= Wesley Viraliliu =

Vanuatuan cricketer (born 1999)

Personal information
- Born: 16 January 1999 (age 27)
- Batting: Right handed
- Bowling: Right arm medium

International information
- National side: Vanuatu
- T20I debut (cap 14): 24 March 2019 v PNG
- Last T20I: 3 October 2019 v Malaysia
- Source: Cricinfo, 3 October 2019

Wesley Viraliliu (born 16 January 1999) is a Vanuatuan cricketer. He played in the 2017 ICC World Cricket League Division Five tournament.

In March 2018, he was named in Vanuatu's squad for the 2018 ICC World Cricket League Division Four tournament in Malaysia. In August 2018, he was named in Vanuatu's squad for Group A of the 2018–19 ICC World Twenty20 East Asia-Pacific Qualifier tournament. In March 2019, he was named in the Vanuatuan squad for the Regional Finals of the 2018–19 ICC World Twenty20 East Asia-Pacific Qualifier tournament. He made his Twenty20 International (T20I) debut against Papua New Guinea on 24 March 2019.

In June 2019, he was selected to represent the Vanuatu cricket team in the men's tournament at the 2019 Pacific Games. He was in Vanuatu's squad for the 2019 Malaysia Cricket World Cup Challenge League A tournament.
