= Kuldeep Singh (cricketer) =

Filipino cricketer (born 1997)

Personal information
- Born: 25 September 1997 (age 29)

International information
- National side: Philippines
- T20I debut (cap 6): 22 March 2019 v PNG
- Last T20I: 24 March 2019 v Vanuatu
- Source: Cricinfo, 24 March 2019

Kuldeep Singh (born 25 September 1997) is a Filipino cricketer who plays for the Philippines cricket team. In March 2019, he was named in the Philippines squad for the Regional Finals of the 2018–19 ICC T20 World Cup East Asia-Pacific Qualifier tournament. Like several other of his teammates, Singh made his Twenty20 International (T20I) debut against Papua New Guinea on 22 March 2019.
