= Vimal Kumar (cricketer) =

Filipino cricketer (born 1979)

Personal information
- Born: 18 November 1979 (age 46)
- Batting: Right-handed
- Bowling: Right-arm off break

International information
- National side: Philippines
- T20I debut (cap 13): 23 March 2019 v PNG
- Last T20I: 21 February 2022 v Oman
- Source: Cricinfo, 21 February 2022

Vimal Kumar (born 18 November 1979) is a Filipino cricketer who plays for the Philippines cricket team. He was named in the Philippines squad for the Regional Finals of the 2018–19 ICC T20 World Cup East Asia-Pacific Qualifier tournament. He made his Twenty20 International (T20I) debut against Papua New Guinea on 23 March 2019.

In February 2022, he was named in the Philippines' team for the 2022 ICC Men's T20 World Cup Global Qualifier A tournament in Oman.
