= Karweng NG =

Filipino cricketer (born 1981)

Personal information
- Born: 21 August 1981 (age 45)
- Batting: Right-handed
- Bowling: Right-arm offbreak
- Role: Batsman

International information
- National side: Philippines
- T20I debut (cap 4): 22 March 2019 v PNG
- Last T20I: 24 March 2019 v Vanuatu
- Source: Cricinfo, 24 March 2019

Karweng NG (born 21 August 1981) is a Filipino cricketer who plays for the Philippines cricket team. He was part of the Philippines squad for the Regional Finals of the 2018–19 ICC T20 World Cup East Asia-Pacific Qualifier tournament. He made his Twenty20 International (T20I) debut against Papua New Guinea on 22 March 2019.
