= Jason Long =

Filipino cricketer (born 1983)

Personal information
- Born: 12 July 1983 (age 43)
- Batting: Right-handed
- Bowling: Left-arm Medium

International information
- National side: Philippines
- T20I debut (cap 12): 23 March 2019 v Vanuatu
- Last T20I: 23 March 2019 v PNG
- Source: Cricinfo, 23 March 2019

Jason Long (born 12 July 1983) is a Filipino cricketer who plays for the Philippines cricket team. In March 2019, he was named in the Philippines squad for the Regional Finals of the 2018–19 ICC T20 World Cup East Asia-Pacific Qualifier tournament. He made his Twenty20 International (T20I) debut against Vanuatu on 23 March 2019.
