= Ruchir Mahajan =

Filipino cricketer (born 1982)

Personal information
- Born: 7 February 1982 (age 44)

International information
- National side: Philippines
- T20I debut (cap 7): 22 March 2019 v PNG
- Last T20I: 24 March 2019 v Vanuatu
- Source: Cricinfo, 24 March 2019

Ruchir Mahajan (born 7 February 1982) is a Filipino cricketer who plays for the Philippines cricket team. In March 2019, he was named in the Philippines squad for the Regional Finals of the 2018–19 ICC T20 World Cup East Asia-Pacific Qualifier tournament. Mahajan made his Twenty20 International (T20I) debut against Papua New Guinea on 22 March 2019.
