= Machanda Biddappa =

Filipino cricketer (born 1992)

Personal information
- Full name: Machanda Ponnaiah Biddappa
- Born: 1 August 1992 (age 34)
- Batting: Right-handed
- Role: Wicket-keeper

International information
- National side: Philippines
- T20I debut (cap 1): 22 March 2019 v PNG
- Last T20I: 24 February 2022 v Germany
- Source: Cricinfo, 24 February 2022

Machanda Biddappa (born 1 August 1992) is a Filipino cricketer who plays for the Philippines cricket team as a wicketkeeper. In March 2019, he was named in the Philippines squad for the Regional Finals of the 2018–19 ICC T20 World Cup East Asia-Pacific Qualifier tournament. He made his Twenty20 International (T20I) debut against Papua New Guinea on 22 March 2019.

In February 2022, he was named in the Philippines' team for the 2022 ICC Men's T20 World Cup Global Qualifier A tournament in Oman.
