= Jelany Chilia =

Vanuatuan cricketer (born 1991)

Personal information
- Born: 29 October 1991 (age 35)
- Batting: Right handed
- Bowling: Right-arm Offbreak

International information
- National side: Vanuatu
- T20I debut (cap 2): 22 March 2019 v PNG
- Last T20I: 4 October 2019 v Malaysia
Medal record
Representing Vanuatu
Men's Cricket
Pacific Games
Silver medal – second place	2019 Apia	Twenty20 International
- Source: Cricinfo, 4 October 2019

Jelany Chilia (born 29 October 1991) is a Vanuatuan cricketer. He played in the 2013 ICC World Cricket League Division Six tournament.

In September 2017, he took the most wickets for Vanuatu in the 2017 ICC World Cricket League Division Five tournament, with a total of ten dismissals in five matches.

In March 2018, he was named in Vanuatu's squad for the 2018 ICC World Cricket League Division Four tournament in Malaysia. In August 2018, he was named in Vanuatu's squad for Group A of the 2018–19 ICC World Twenty20 East Asia-Pacific Qualifier tournament.

In March 2019, he was named in the Vanuatuan squad for the Regional Finals of the 2018–19 ICC World Twenty20 East Asia-Pacific Qualifier tournament. He made his Twenty20 International (T20I) debut against Papua New Guinea on 22 March 2019.

In June 2019, he was selected to represent the Vanuatu cricket team in the men's tournament at the 2019 Pacific Games. In September 2019, he was named in Vanuatu's squad for the 2019 Malaysia Cricket World Cup Challenge League A tournament. He made his List A debut against Canada, in the Cricket World Cup Challenge League A tournament on 17 September 2019.
