= Haider Kiani =

Filipino cricketer (born 1986)

Personal information
- Full name: Jan Haider Kiani
- Born: 27 June 1986 (age 40)
- Batting: Left-handed
- Role: Batsman

International information
- National side: Philippines
- T20I debut (cap 5): 22 March 2019 v PNG
- Last T20I: 24 March 2019 v Vanuatu
- Source: Cricinfo, 24 March 2019

Haider Kiani (born 27 June 1986) is a Filipino cricketer who plays for the Philippines cricket team. Kiani is a left-handed batsman. In March 2019, he was named in the Philippines squad for the Regional Finals of the 2018–19 ICC T20 World Cup East Asia-Pacific Qualifier tournament. He made his Twenty20 International (T20I) debut against Papua New Guinea on 22 March 2019.
