= Trevor Langa =

Vanuatuan cricketer (born 1989)

Personal information
- Born: 30 October 1989 (age 37)
- Batting: Right handed
- Role: Wicket-keeper

International information
- National side: Vanuatu
- Only T20I (cap 17): 4 October 2019 v Malaysia
- Source: Cricinfo, 4 October 2019

Trevor Langa (born 30 October 1989) is a Vanuatuan cricketer. He played in the 2013 ICC World Cricket League Division Six tournament.

In March 2018, he was named in Vanuatu's squad for the 2018 ICC World Cricket League Division Four tournament in Malaysia. In September 2019, he was named in Vanuatu's squad for the 2019 Malaysia Cricket World Cup Challenge League A tournament. In the same month he was named in Vanuatu's Twenty20 International (T20I) squad for their series against Malaysia. He made his T20I debut, against Malaysia, on 4 October 2019. That remains his only T20I appearance for the national side.
