= Kiplin Doriga =

Papua New Guinean cricketer (born 1995)

Personal information
- Born: 18 October 1995 (age 31); Port Moresby, Papua New Guinea
- Batting: Right-handed
- Role: Batsman, occasional wicket-keeper

International information
- National side: Papua New Guinea
- ODI debut (cap 20): 24 November 2017 v Scotland
- Last ODI: 15 March 2023 v United Arab Emirates
- T20I debut (cap 23): 22 March 2019 v Philippines
- Last T20I: 23 July 2023 v Philippines

Career statistics
| Competition | ODI | FC | LA |
|---|---|---|---|
| Matches | 18 | 1 | 25 |
| Runs scored | 279 | 53 | 430 |
| Batting average | 18.60 | 26.50 | 20.47 |
| 100s/50s | 0/1 | 0/0 | 0/2 |
| Top score | 89* | 40 | 89* |
| Catches/stumpings | 8/2 | 1/– | 17/4 |
- Source: Cricinfo, 23 July 2023

Kiplin Doriga (born 18 October 1995) is a Papua New Guinean cricketer.

== Career (2017–2025) ==
He made his One Day International (ODI) debut against Scotland on 24 November 2017. He made his first-class debut against Hong Kong in the 2015–17 ICC Intercontinental Cup on 29 November 2017.

In August 2018, he was named in Papua New Guinea's squad for Group A of the 2018–19 ICC World Twenty20 East Asia-Pacific Qualifier tournament.

In March 2019, he was named in Papua New Guinea's squad for the Regional Finals of the 2018–19 ICC World Twenty20 East Asia-Pacific Qualifier tournament. He made his Twenty20 International (T20I) debut for Papua New Guinea against the Philippines on 22 March 2019. The following month, he was named in Papua New Guinea's squad for the 2019 ICC World Cricket League Division Two tournament in Namibia.

In June 2019, he was selected to represent the Papua New Guinea cricket team in the men's tournament at the 2019 Pacific Games. In September 2019, he was named in Papua New Guinea's squad for the 2019 ICC T20 World Cup Qualifier tournament in the United Arab Emirates. In August 2021, Doriga was named in Papua New Guinea's squad for the 2021 ICC Men's T20 World Cup.

In May 2024, he was named in Papua New Guinea’s squad for the 2024 ICC Men's T20 World Cup tournament.

== Legal trouble (2025–present) ==
On 25 August, as Doriga was returning to his hotel around 2:30am, he punched a woman to the ground on Hilary Street in St Helier, Jersey, and stole her phone. The authorities arrested him later the same day. He had been on the island of Jersey to play for Papua New Guinea in the Cricket World Cup Challenge League A.

On 27 August, Doriga appeared at the Magistrate's Court charged with robbery; he pleaded guilty to the charge. The magistrate ruled the case so serious that it should be adjudicated at the Royal Court. Doriga was also denied bail and was instead remanded in custody until a further hearing scheduled for 28 November.

On 28 November, the Royal Court formally sentenced Doriga to three years in prison.
