= List of Vanuatu Twenty20 International cricketers =

Vanuatu Twenty20 International cricketers

This is a list of Vanuatu Twenty20 International cricketers.

In April 2018, the ICC decided to grant full Twenty20 International (T20I) status to all its members. Therefore, all Twenty20 matches played between Vanuatu and other ICC members after 1 January 2019 will be eligible for T20I status.

This list comprises all members of the Vanuatu cricket team who have played at least one T20I match. It is initially arranged in the order in which each player won his first Twenty20 cap. Where more than one player won their first Twenty20 cap in the same match, they are listed alphabetically by surname.

== Key ==
General

- ‡ – Captain
- † – Wicket-keeper
- First – Year of debut
- Last – Year of latest game
- Mat – Number of matches played

Batting

- Runs – Runs scored in career
- HS – Highest score
- 50 – Half-centuries scored
- 100 – Centuries scored
- Avg – Runs scored per dismissal
- * – Batsman remained not out

Bowling

- Balls – Balls bowled in career
- Wkt – Wickets taken in career
- BBI – Best bowling in an innings
- Ave – Average runs per wicket

Fielding

- Ca – Catches taken
- St – Stumpings affected

== List of players ==
Statistics are correct as of 17 May 2026.

Vanuatu T20I cricketers
General					Batting					Bowling				Fielding		Ref
No.	Name	First	Last	Mat	Runs	HS	Avg	50	100	Balls	Wkt	BBI	Ave	Ca	St	Ref
1	Callum Blake	2019	2019	3	–	–	–	–	–	48	1	1/15	49.00	0	0	
2	Jelany Chilia	2019	2019	14	54	23	18.00	0	0	284	6	1/21	52.50	4	0	
3	Jonathon Dunn	2019	2019	4	36	23	12.00	0	0	–	–	–	–	0	0	
4	Gilmour Kaltongga	2019	2019	3	10	10	5.00	0	0	–	–	–	–	0	0	
5	Andrew Mansale‡	2019	2026	40	808	82	23.08	5	0	174	13	3/13	15.30	18	0	
6	Williamsing Nalisa	2019	2026	36	84	31*	9.33	0	0	618	31	6/16	23.67	8	0	
7	Nalin Nipiko	2019	2026	45	1,086	100	28.57	6	1	589	50	5/19	16.18	9	0	
8	Simpson Obed	2019	2024	26	90	21*	9.00	0	0	258	19	4/29	15.10	6	0	
9	Joshua Rasu‡	2019	2026	45	818	74	20.45	3	0	660	50	5/36	16.06	12	0	
10	Ronald Tari‡	2019	2024	38	395	56	15.19	1	0	13	0	–	–	17	0	
11	Jamal Vira†	2019	2024	21	131	23	8.73	0	0	–	–	–	–	12	4	
12	Zechariah Shem	2019	2019	5	1	1*	–	0	0	36	1	1/36	72.00	0	0	
13	Clement Tommy†	2019	2026	30	407	47	16.28	0	0	–	–	–	–	15	4	
14	Wesley Viraliliu	2019	2019	10	34	13*	8.50	0	0	122	5	3/19	32.80	1	0	
15	Patrick Matautaava‡	2019	2026	34	520	103	16.77	1	1	592	38	3/7	16.31	21	0	
16	Apolinaire Stephen	2019	2024	16	14	7	2.00	0	0	301	16	3/40	23.00	3	0	
17	Trevor Langa	2019	2019	1	14	14	14.00	0	0	–	–	–	–	0	0	
18	Jarryd Allan†	2022	2026	19	175	36	11.56	0	0	–	–	–	–	10	3	
19	Junior Kaltapau	2022	2026	31	497	60	21.60	1	0	24	1	1/51	51.00	6	0	
20	Rival Samson	2022	2022	2	–	–	–	–	–	30	4	2/14	9.25	0	0	
21	Womejo Wotu	2022	2026	24	187	25*	10.38	0	0	110	5	2/19	28.20	10	0	
22	Darren Wotu	2022	2026	22	22	7*	22.00	0	0	375	17	3/21	25.52	5	0	
23	Obed Yosef	2022	2023	8	1	1*	–	0	0	126	5	2/20	32.60	3	0	
24	Godfrey Mangau	2023	2023	3	12	9*	–	0	0	66	5	3/36	12.80	0	0	
25	Ala Viraliliu	2023	2026	4	51	39	17.00	0	0	–	–	–	–	3	0	
26	Tim Cutler	2024	2026	14	69	34*	13.80	0	0	288	12	3/11	30.00	0	0	
27	Kenny Tari	2024	2024	1	–	–	–	–	–	18	1	1/26	26.00	0	0	
28	Nicholas Venables	2026	2026	6	1	1	0.50	0	0	126	3	2/11	39.33	0	0	
29	Roderick Lekai	2026	2026	1	2	2	2.00	0	0	–	–	–	–	0	0	

Note: The following matches include one or more missing catchers in their Cricinfo scorecard and hence statistics (as of 19 July 2019):

- vs. Samoa (9 July 2019); 6 missing catchers
- vs. Papua New Guinea (12 July 2019); 5 missing catchers
- vs. Papua New Guinea (13 July 2019); 3 missing catchers
