= Chad Soper =

Papua New Guinean cricketer

Personal information
- Full name: Chad Aiwati Soper
- Born: 19 November 1991 (age 34); Port Moresby, Papua New Guinea
- Batting: Right-handed
- Bowling: Right-arm medium-fast
- Role: Bowling-all rounder

International information
- National side: Papua New Guinea
- ODI debut (cap 16): 4 November 2016 v Hong Kong
- Last ODI: 15 March 2023 v United Arab Emirates
- ODI shirt no.: 77
- T20I debut (cap 13): 23 July 2015 v Afghanistan
- Last T20I: 17 July 2022 v USA

Career statistics
Competition	ODI	T20I	FC	LA
Matches	27	16	6	41
Runs scored	394	53	210	519
Batting average	20.73	17.66	26.25	19.22
100s/50s	0/0	0/0	0/1	0/0
Top score	46*	19	60	46*
Balls bowled	1,248	258	972	1,794
Wickets	38	19	13	52
Bowling average	25.34	12.31	27.15	26.07
5 wickets in innings	1	0	0	2
10 wickets in match	0	0	0	0
Best bowling	6/41	3/13	4/33	6/41
Catches/stumpings	7/–	2/–	2/–	11/–
Medal record
Representing Papua New Guinea
Men's Cricket
Pacific Games
Gold medal – first place	2019 Apia	Twenty20 International
- Source: Cricinfo, 16 March 2023

Chad Soper (born 19 November 1991) is a Papua New Guinean cricketer. Born in Port Moresby to a Papua New Guinean mother and a New Zealand father, Soper grew up on the New South Wales Central Coast in Australia.

== International career ==
Best known for his bowling ability, Soper represented Papua New Guinea under-19s in the 2012 Under-19 Cricket World Cup in Australia. He took 5/32 against India to help bowl them out for 204.

He made his List A debut in the 2015–17 ICC World Cricket League Championship on 22 June 2015 against the Netherlands. He made his first-class debut in the 2015–17 ICC Intercontinental Cup on 21 November 2015 against Afghanistan. On 28 May 2016, Soper took his first five-wicket haul in a List A game in the match between Papua New Guinea and Kenya in the 2015–17 ICC World Cricket League Championship.

He made his Twenty20 International (T20) debut against Afghanistan in the 2015 ICC World Twenty20 Qualifier tournament on 23 July 2015. He made his One Day International (ODI) debut on 4 November 2016 against Hong Kong. In the second ODI of the tour, he took his first international five-wicket haul, taking figures of 6/41. Soper was adjudged man of the match for his performances.

In August 2018, he was named in Papua New Guinea's squad for Group A of the 2018–19 ICC World Twenty20 East Asia-Pacific Qualifier tournament. He was the leading wicket-taker for Papua New Guinea in the tournament, with ten dismissals in six matches. In March 2019, he was named in Papua New Guinea's squad for the Regional Finals of the 2018–19 ICC World Twenty20 East Asia-Pacific Qualifier tournament. The following month, he was named in Papua New Guinea's squad for the 2019 ICC World Cricket League Division Two tournament in Namibia.

In June 2019, he was selected to represent the Papua New Guinea cricket team in the men's tournament at the 2019 Pacific Games. In September 2019, he was named in Papua New Guinea's squad for the 2019 ICC T20 World Cup Qualifier tournament in the United Arab Emirates. In August 2021, Soper was named in Papua New Guinea's squad for the 2021 ICC Men's T20 World Cup.

In May 2024, he was named in Papua New Guinea’s squad for the 2024 ICC Men's T20 World Cup tournament.
