= Jonathan Hill (cricketer) =

Filipino-Australian cricketer

Personal information
- Born: 11 December 1990 (age 35); Goulburn, New South Wales, Australia
- Batting: Right-handed
- Bowling: Right-arm fast-medium
- Role: All-rounder

International information
- National side: Philippines
- T20I debut (cap 3): 22 March 2019 v Papua New Guinea
- Last T20I: 24 February 2022 v Germany
- Source: Cricinfo, 24 February 2022

Jonathan Hill (born 11 December 1990) is a Filipino-Australian cricketer who is the current captain of the Philippines cricket team. Hill was born in Goulburn, New South Wales, Australia, and gained a Philippine passport in 2012, qualifying through his mother, who comes from Mindanao. He has played for the Philippines cricket team since 2017, and also works as a school teacher in Australia.

In December 2018, Hill led the Philippines team, as they won Group B of the 2018–19 ICC T20 World Cup East Asia-Pacific Qualifier tournament, with Hill saying "there is something special about this side". Therefore, after winning the qualifier, the Philippines progressed to the Regional Finals, with Hill again named captain of the side for the tournament.

In March 2019, he was named in the Philippines squad for the Regional Finals of the 2018–19 ICC T20 World Cup East Asia-Pacific Qualifier tournament. He made his Twenty20 International (T20I) debut for the Philippines against Papua New Guinea on 22 March 2019.

He was part of the Philippines' team for the 2022 ICC Men's T20 World Cup Global Qualifier A tournament in Oman.
