= Callum Blake =

Vanuatu cricketer (born 1994)

Personal information
- Born: 3 July 1994 (age 32); Vanuatu
- Batting: Right handed
- Bowling: Right-arm medium

International information
- National side: Vanuatu (2014–)
- T20I debut (cap 1): 22 March 2019 v PNG
- Last T20I: 24 March 2019 v Philippines
- Source: Cricinfo, 23 March 2019

Callum Charles Blake (born 3 July 1994) is a Vanuatu cricketer. Blake was born and raised in Vanuatu. He moved to Brisbane, Australia, to attend secondary school at Anglican Church Grammar School. Blake made his international debut for Vanuatu at the 2014 ICC East Asia-Pacific Men's Championship.

Blake played in the 2015 ICC World Cricket League Division Six tournament in England. In March 2018, he was named in Vanuatu's squad for the 2018 ICC World Cricket League Division Four tournament in Malaysia.

He was named in Vanuatu's squad for Group A of the 2018–19 ICC World Twenty20 East Asia-Pacific Qualifier tournament. He was the joint-leading wicket-taker in the tournament, with eleven dismissals in five matches.

In March 2019, he was named in the Vanuatuan squad for the Regional Finals of the 2018–19 ICC World Twenty20 East Asia-Pacific Qualifier tournament. He made his Twenty20 International (T20I) debut against Papua New Guinea on 22 March 2019.
