= Alu Kapa =

Cricket umpire

Personal information
- Full name: Alu Kapa
- Born: 24 October 1959 (age 67); Hula, Central Province, Papua New Guinea

Umpiring information
- ODIs umpired: 5 (2017–2022)
- T20Is umpired: 9 (2019–2023)
- WODIs umpired: 3 (2025)
- WT20Is umpired: 10 (2019–2025)
- Source: CricketArchive, 21 September 2022

Alu Kapa (born 24 October 1959) is a cricket umpire from Papua New Guinea, who is on the ICC Associates and Affiliates Umpire Panel. Kapa has stood in matches in the 2015–17 ICC World Cricket League Championship. He was one of the eight umpires for the 2016 ICC World Cricket League Division Four tournament. He made his One Day International umpiring debut in a match between Papua New Guinea and Scotland on 24 November 2017. He stood in his first Twenty20 International match between the Philippines and Vanuatu in the Regional Final of the 2018–19 ICC World Twenty20 East Asia-Pacific Qualifier tournament on 23 March 2019.

== See also ==
- List of One Day International cricket umpires
- List of Twenty20 International cricket umpires
