= Patrick Matautaava =

Vanuatuan cricketer

Personal information
- Born: 27 September 1991 (age 35); Vanuatu
- Batting: Right handed
- Bowling: Right-arm medium
- Relatives: Andrew Mansale (cousin)

International information
- National side: Vanuatu
- T20I debut (cap 15): 9 July 2019 v PNG
- Last T20I: 11 March 2024 v Kuwait
Medal record
Representing Vanuatu
Men's Cricket
Pacific Games
Gold medal – first place	2015 Port Moresby	20 over cricket
Silver medal – second place	2019 Apia	Twenty20 International
- Source: Cricinfo, 10 September 2025

Patrick Kaltaneaki Matautaava (born 27 September 1991) is a Vanuatuan cricketer. He played in the 2013 ICC World Cricket League Division Six tournament.

In September 2017, during the 2017 ICC World Cricket League Division Five tournament, he scored 139 not out off 76 balls against Germany. With a total of 290 runs in five matches, Matautaava scored the most runs for Vanuatu in the tournament.

In March 2018, he was named in Vanuatu's squad for the 2018 ICC World Cricket League Division Four tournament in Malaysia. He was named as the player to watch in the squad ahead of the tournament. With nine dismissals in five matches, he was the leading wicket-taker for Vanuatu in the tournament.

In August 2018, he was named in Vanuatu's squad for Group A of the 2018–19 ICC World Twenty20 East Asia-Pacific Qualifier tournament. He was part of the Vanuatuan squad for the Regional Finals of the 2018–19 ICC World Twenty20 East Asia-Pacific Qualifier tournament.

He made his Twenty20 International (T20I) debut on 9 July 2019, against Papua New Guinea, in the men's tournament at the 2019 Pacific Games. In September 2019, he was named in Vanuatu's squad for the 2019 Malaysia Cricket World Cup Challenge League A tournament. He made his List A debut for Vanuatu, against Canada, in the Cricket World Cup Challenge League A tournament on 17 September 2019.

Later in September 2019, he was named in Vanuatu's squad for their series against Malaysia. In the second match of the series, Matautaava scored 103 runs from 52 balls, becoming the first batsman for Vanuatu to score a century in a T20I match.

In April 2022, he signed a six-month deal with Herning Cricket Club in Denmark as a player-coach. He scored 99 runs in 55 balls while making his debut for the club, against Soraner at Skanderborg.
