= Metuisela Beitaki =

Fijian cricketer (born 1995)

Personal information
- Born: 16 October 1995 (age 31)
- Batting: Right-handed
- Role: Wicket-keeper

International information
- National side: Fiji
- T20I debut (cap 3): 9 September 2022 v Vanuatu
- Last T20I: 24 August 2024 v Cook Islands
- Source: Cricinfo, 19 September 2025

Metuisela Beitaki (born 16 October 1995) is a Fijian cricketer. He played in the 2015 ICC World Cricket League Division Six tournament.

In August 2018, Beitaki played in Fiji's opening fixture of the 2018–19 ICC World Twenty20 East Asia-Pacific Qualifier tournament, against Vanuatu, top-scoring with 52 runs. A left-handed wicket-keeper batsman, Beitaki was the leading run-scorer for Fiji in the tournament, with 192 runs in six matches.

He was part of Fiji's Twenty20 International (T20I) squad for the 2022 ICC Men's T20 World Cup East Asia-Pacific Qualifier A in Vanuatu. He made his T20I debut on 9 September 2022 against Vanuatu.
