= Daniel Smith (Filipino cricketer) =

Filipino-Australian cricketer (born 1992)

Personal information
- Full name: Daniel Christopher Smith
- Born: 16 March 1992 (age 34)
- Batting: Right-handed
- Bowling: Right-arm medium

International information
- National side: Philippines
- T20I debut (cap 30): 22 March 2019 v PNG
- Last T20I: 18 May 2026 v Fiji
Medal record
Men's cricket
Representing the Philippines
Southeast Asian Games
Silver medal – second place	2025 Thailand	Men's T20
Silver medal – second place	2025 Thailand	Men's T10
- Source: Cricinfo, 05 October 2024

Daniel Smith (born 16 March 1992) is a Filipino-Australian cricketer who plays for the Philippines cricket team. He is a practising lawyer in New South Wales. Smith holds Philippines citizenship through his mother. He has also played first-grade cricket for Gordon District Cricket Club in the NSW Premier Cricket competition in Australia.

In March 2019, he was named in the Philippines squad for the Regional Finals of the 2018–19 ICC T20 World Cup East Asia-Pacific Qualifier tournament. He made his Twenty20 International (T20I) debut against Papua New Guinea on 22 March 2019.

In February 2022, he was named the vice-captain of the Philippines team for the 2022 ICC Men's T20 World Cup Global Qualifier A tournament in Oman.
