= List of Philippines Twenty20 International cricketers =

This is a list of Filipino Twenty20 International cricketers.

In April 2018, the ICC decided to grant full Twenty20 International (T20I) status to all its members. Therefore, all Twenty20 matches played between Philippines and other ICC members after 1 January 2019 have the full T20I status.

This list comprises all members of the Philippines cricket team who have played at least one T20I match. It is initially arranged in the order in which each player won his first Twenty20 cap. Where more than one player won his first Twenty20 cap in the same match, they are listed alphabetically by surname.

== Key ==
General

- ‡ – Captain
- † – Wicket-keeper
- First – Year of debut
- Last – Year of latest game
- Mat – Number of matches played

Batting

- Runs – Runs scored in career
- HS – Highest score
- Avg – Runs scored per dismissal
- * – Batsman remained not out
- 50 – Half-centuries scored
- 100 – Centuries scored

Bowling

- Balls – Balls bowled in career
- Wkt – Wickets taken in career
- BBI – Best bowling in an innings
- Ave – Average runs per wicket

Fielding

- Ca – Catches taken
- St – Stumpings affected

== List of players ==
Statistics are correct as of 18 May 2026.

Philippines T20I cricketers
General					Batting					Bowling				Fielding		Ref
No.	Name	First	Last	Mat	Runs	HS	Avg	50	100	Balls	Wkt	BBI	Ave	Ca	St	Ref
1	Machanda Biddappa†	2019	2022	7	63	26	15.75	0	0	–	–	–	–	3	1	
2	Richard Goodwin	2019	2022	9	28	16*	4.00	0	0	12	0	–	–	2	0	
3	Jonathan Hill‡	2019	2023	9	42	11	6.00	0	0	36	3	2/27	16.66	0	0	
4	Karweng NG	2019	2019	4	21	14	7.00	0	0	54	0	–	–	2	0	
5	Haider Kiani	2019	2023	5	29	13	9.66	0	0	24	1	1/26	26.00	1	0	
6	Kuldeep Singh	2019	2019	4	8	6	2.66	0	0	–	–	–	–	1	0	
7	Ruchir Mahajan	2019	2019	3	1	1*	–	0	0	60	2	1/18	46.50	0	0	
8	Grant Russ†	2019	2025	27	244	43*	17.42	0	0	18	0	–	–	6	5	
9	Surinder Singh	2019	2026	9	7	7*	–	0	0	138	8	3/32	22.62	1	0	
10	Daniel Smith‡	2019	2026	40	657	68	17.75	2	0	573	28	4/20	25.85	11	0	
11	Henry Tyler‡†	2019	2026	39	408	46*	14.06	0	0	394	22	4/18	26.77	15	3	
12	Jason Long	2019	2019	2	2	2*	–	0	0	12	1	1/26	26.00	1	0	
13	Vimal Kumar	2019	2022	4	18	15*	18.00	0	0	36	0	–	–	1	0	
14	Jordan Alegre	2022	2023	16	192	41	14.76	0	0	–	–	–	–	6	0	
15	Gurbhupinder Chohan	2022	2026	28	169	22	11.26	0	0	264	13	3/18	31.00	8	0	
16	Huzaifa Mohammed	2022	2026	30	118	27*	23.60	0	0	629	26	3/25	24.38	5	0	
17	Kapil Kumar	2022	2023	6	71	23	11.83	0	0	–	–	–	–	0	0	
18	Miggy Podosky	2022	2025	35	602	101	19.41	1	1	168	5	2/21	46.00	10	0	
19	Muzammil Shahzad	2022	2022	3	2	1	0.66	0	0	–	–	–	–	3	0	
20	Hern Isorena	2022	2023	5	30	21	7.50	0	0	–	–	–	–	1	0	
21	Siva Mohan	2022	2022	1	0	0	0.00	0	0	–	–	–	–	0	0	
22	Robert Mitchell	2023	2023	1	0	0	0.00	0	0	6	0	–	–	0	0	
23	Amanpreet Sirah	2023	2026	31	284	58*	14.94	1	0	568	39	4/14	16.48	13	0	
24	Josef Doctora	2023	2026	20	121	42*	11.00	0	0	92	5	3/30	26.40	13	0	
25	Kepler Lukies	2023	2025	32	140	43	14.00	0	0	712	44	5/10	14.93	9	0	
26	Neil Smith	2023	2023	3	4	4	2.00	0	0	–	–	–	–	0	0	
27	Ryan Hutton	2023	2023	1	1	1*	–	0	0	6	1	1/13	13.00	0	0	
28	Liam Myott	2023	2025	22	33	13*	8.25	0	0	471	27	4/11	17.66	14	0	
29	Arashdeep Samra	2023	2026	28	674	101	26.96	3	1	36	0	–	–	10	0	
30	Francis Walsh	2023	2025	3	4	3	4.00	0	0	48	5	3/27	17.00	0	0	
31	Kulwinderjeet Singh	2023	2026	11	163	46	18.11	0	0	5	2	2/6	3.00	1	0	
32	Andrew Donovan	2024	2026	21	506	122*	42.16	2	1	126	3	1/6	47.33	5	0	
33	Rhys Burinaga	2024	2025	14	66	22	6.60	0	0	49	6	4/33	9.66	5	0	
34	Nivek Tanner	2024	2026	25	296	60*	15.57	0	0	346	24	5/29	18.62	11	0	
35	Jonathon Tuffin	2024	2026	22	232	32*	16.57	0	0	420	23	4/22	19.78	11	0	
36	Mark Manalo	2025	2025	1	12	12	12.00	0	0	–	–	–	–	0	0	
37	Christopher Stamp	2025	2026	8	44	15*	22.00	0	0	–	–	–	–	5	0	
