= Williamsing Nalisa =

Vanuatuan cricketer

Personal information
- Born: 18 November 1999 (age 26)
- Batting: Right handed
- Bowling: Right-arm legbreak googly

International information
- National side: Vanuatu
- T20I debut (cap 6): 22 March 2019 v PNG
- Last T20I: 24 August 2024 v Samoa
- Source: Cricinfo, 12 September 2024

Williamsing Nalisa (born 18 November 1999) is a Vanuatuan cricketer. In April 2018, he was named in Vanuatu's squad for the 2018 ICC World Cricket League Division Four tournament in Malaysia. He played in Vanuatu's opening match of the tournament, against Jersey.

He was part of Vanuatu's squad for Group A of the 2018–19 ICC World Twenty20 East Asia-Pacific Qualifier tournament. In March 2019, he was named in the Vanuatuan squad for the Regional Finals of the 2018–19 ICC World Twenty20 East Asia-Pacific Qualifier tournament. He made his Twenty20 International (T20I) debut against Papua New Guinea on 22 March 2019.

In June 2019, he was selected to represent the Vanuatu cricket team in the men's tournament at the 2019 Pacific Games. In September 2019, he was named in Vanuatu's squad for the 2019 Malaysia Cricket World Cup Challenge League A tournament. He made his List A debut against Canada, in the Cricket World Cup Challenge League A tournament on 17 September 2019.
