= Muhammad Wafiq =

Malaysian cricketer (born 1996)

Personal information
- Full name: Muhammad Wafiq Irfan Zarbani
- Born: 25 April 1996 (age 30)
- Batting: Left-handed
- Bowling: Left-arm medium-fast

International information
- National side: Malaysia
- T20I debut (cap 17): 29 September 2019 v Vanuatu
- Last T20I: 12 March 2023 v Hong Kong
Medal record
Representing Malaysia
Men's Cricket
Southeast Asian Games
Gold medal – first place	2017 Kuala Lumpur	50 over
Silver medal – second place	2017 Kuala Lumpur	Twenty20
Silver medal – second place	2023 Phnom Penh	50 over
- Source: Cricinfo, 16 March 2023

Muhammad Wafiq (born 25 April 1996) is a Malaysian cricketer, who plays for the national cricket team. He played for Malaysia in the 2017 ICC World Cricket League Division Three tournament in May 2017. In April 2018, he was named in Malaysia's squad for the 2018 ICC World Cricket League Division Four tournament, also held in Malaysia. He was named as the player to watch in the squad ahead of the tournament. In October 2018, he was named in Malaysia's squad in the Eastern sub-region group for the 2018–19 ICC World Twenty20 Asia Qualifier tournament.

In September 2019, he was named in Malaysia's Twenty20 International (T20I) squad for their series against Vanuatu. He made his T20I debut for Malaysia, against Vanuatu, on 29 September 2019. In July 2022, he was named in Malaysia's squad for the 2022 Canada Cricket World Cup Challenge League A tournament. He made his List A debut on 28 July 2022, for Malaysia against Vanuatu.
