= Jamal Vira =

Vanuatuan cricketer (born 1994)

Personal information
- Born: 18 April 1994 (age 32); Canberra, Australia
- Batting: Right handed
- Role: Wicketkeeper Batter

International information
- National side: Vanuatu
- T20I debut (cap 11): 22 March 2019 v PNG
- Last T20I: 11 March 2024 v Kuwait

Career statistics
Competition	T20I	LA
Matches	21	10
Runs scored	131	61
Batting average	8.73	6.77
100s/50s	0/0	0/0
Top score	23	26
Catches/stumpings	12/4	9/0
- Source: Cricinfo, 23 March 2025

Jamal Vira (born 18 April 1994) is a Vanuatu cricketer. He played in the 2016 ICC World Cricket League Division Five tournament.

In August 2017, he was named in Vanuatu's squad for the 2017 ICC World Cricket League Division Five tournament in South Africa. In August 2018, he was named in Vanuatu's squad for Group A of the 2018–19 ICC T20 World Cup East Asia-Pacific Qualifier tournament.

In March 2019, he was named in the Vanuatu squad for the Regional Finals of the 2018–19 ICC T20 World Cup East Asia-Pacific Qualifier tournament. He made his Twenty20 International (T20I) debut against Papua New Guinea on 22 March 2019.

In June 2019, he was selected to represent the Vanuatu cricket team in the men's tournament at the 2019 Pacific Games.

In September 2019, he was named in Vanuatu's squad for the 2019 Malaysia Cricket World Cup Challenge League A tournament. He made his List A debut, against Singapore, in the Cricket World Cup Challenge League A tournament on 22 September 2019.
