= Nalin Nipiko =

Vanuatuan cricketer

Personal information
- Born: 21 September 1995 (age 31)
- Batting: Right handed
- Bowling: Right-arm medium

International information
- National side: Vanuatu
- T20I debut (cap 7): 22 March 2019 v PNG
- Last T20I: 24 August 2024 v Samoa

Career statistics
Competition	T20I	LA
Matches	39	19
Runs scored	1031	277
Batting average	31.24	15.38
100s/50s	1/6	0/1
Top score	100	77
Balls bowled	565	656
Wickets	49	29
Bowling average	15.73	21.27
5 wickets in innings	1	2
10 wickets in match	0	0
Best bowling	5/19	5/38
Catches/stumpings	7/–	4/–
Medal record
Representing Vanuatu
Men's Cricket
Pacific Games
Gold medal – first place	2015 Port Moresby	20 over cricket
Silver medal – second place	2019 Apia	Twenty20 International
- Source: Cricinfo, 12 September 2025

Nalin Nipiko (born 21 September 1995) is a Vanuatuan cricketer who is the current captain of the Vanuatu national cricket team. He started his career in 2009, playing for the under-15 team. He played in the 2013 ICC World Cricket League Division Six tournament.

== Career ==
In March 2018, he was named in Vanuatu's squad for the 2018 ICC World Cricket League Division Four tournament in Malaysia. In August 2018, he was named in Vanuatu's squad for Group A of the 2018–19 ICC World Twenty20 East Asia-Pacific Qualifier tournament.

In March 2019, he was named in the Vanuatuan squad for the Regional Finals of the 2018–19 ICC World Twenty20 East Asia-Pacific Qualifier tournament. He made his Twenty20 International (T20I) debut against Papua New Guinea on 22 March 2019. During the Regional Finals, he scored 124 runs and took five wickets in the four matches he played, and was named the Player of the Tournament.

In June 2019, he was selected to represent the Vanuatu cricket team in the men's tournament at the 2019 Pacific Games. In September 2019, he was named in Vanuatu's squad for the 2019 Malaysia Cricket World Cup Challenge League A tournament. He made his List A debut, against Canada, in the Cricket World Cup Challenge League A tournament on 17 September 2019. He finished the tournament as the leading run-scorer for Vanuatu, with 133 runs in five matches.
