= Ronald Tari =

Vanuatuan cricketer (born 1994)

Personal information
- Born: 1 January 1994 (age 32)
- Batting: Right handed
- Bowling: Right-arm medium

International information
- National side: Vanuatu
- T20I debut (cap 10): 22 March 2019 v PNG
- Last T20I: 23 August 2024 v Fiji
- Source: Cricinfo, 11 September 2025

Ronald Tari (born 1 January 1994) is a Vanuatuan cricketer. He played in the 2015 ICC World Cricket League Division Six tournament.

In March 2018, he was named in Vanuatu's squad for the 2018 ICC World Cricket League Division Four tournament in Malaysia. In August 2018, he was named in Vanuatu's squad for Group A of the 2018–19 ICC World Twenty20 East Asia-Pacific Qualifier tournament.

He was part of the Vanuatuan squad for the Regional Finals of the 2018–19 ICC World Twenty20 East Asia-Pacific Qualifier tournament. He made his Twenty20 International (T20I) debut against Papua New Guinea on 22 March 2019.

In June 2019, he was selected to represent the Vanuatu cricket team in the men's tournament at the 2019 Pacific Games. In September 2019, he was named in Vanuatu's squad for the 2019 Malaysia Cricket World Cup Challenge League A tournament. He made his List A debut against Canada, in the Cricket World Cup Challenge League A tournament on 17 September 2019.
