= Joshua Rasu =

Vanuatuan cricketer

Personal information
- Born: 14 April 1994 (age 32)
- Batting: Right handed
- Bowling: Right arm Medium

International information
- National side: Vanuatu
- T20I debut (cap 9): 22 March 2019 v PNG
- Last T20I: 17 May 2026 v Papua New Guinea

Career statistics
Competition	T20I	LA
Matches	39	19
Runs scored	675	325
Batting average	19.85	18.05
100s/50s	0/2	0/1
Top score	74	53
Balls bowled	534	744
Wickets	35	25
Bowling average	18.34	22.60
5 wickets in innings	1	1
10 wickets in match	0	0
Best bowling	5/36	5/32
Catches/stumpings	10/–	15/–
Medal record
Representing Vanuatu
Men's Cricket
Pacific Games
Silver medal – second place	2019 Apia	Twenty20 International
- Source: Cricinfo, 23 March 2025

Joshua Rasu (born 14 April 1994) is a Vanuatuan cricketer. He played in the 2015 ICC World Cricket League Division Six tournament. In March 2018, he was named in Vanuatu's squad for the 2018 ICC World Cricket League Division Four tournament in Malaysia.

He was part of Vanuatu's squad for Group A of the 2018–19 ICC World Twenty20 East Asia-Pacific Qualifier tournament. He was the leading run-scorer for Vanuatu during the tournament, with 198 runs in six matches.

In March 2019, he was named in the Vanuatuan squad for the Regional Finals of the 2018–19 ICC World Twenty20 East Asia-Pacific Qualifier tournament. He made his Twenty20 International (T20I) debut against Papua New Guinea on 22 March 2019.

In June 2019, he was selected to represent the Vanuatu cricket team in the men's tournament at the 2019 Pacific Games. In September 2019, he was named in Vanuatu's squad for the 2019 Malaysia Cricket World Cup Challenge League A tournament. He made his List A debut against Canada in the Cricket World Cup Challenge League A tournament on 17 September 2019.
