= Simpson Obed =

Vanuatuan cricketer (born 1989)

Personal information
- Born: 17 September 1989 (age 37)
- Batting: Right handed
- Bowling: Right-arm legbreak

International information
- National side: Vanuatu
- T20I debut (cap 8): 22 March 2019 v PNG
- Last T20I: 21 August 2024 v Cook Islands
Medal record
Representing Vanuatu
Men's Cricket
Pacific Games
| Silver medal – second place | 2019 Apia | Twenty20 International |
- Source: Cricinfo, 11 September 2025

Simpson Hopeman Obed (born 17 September 1989) is a Vanuatuan cricketer. He played in the 2015 ICC World Cricket League Division Six tournament.

In March 2018, he was named in Vanuatu's squad for the 2018 ICC World Cricket League Division Four tournament in Malaysia. He made his Twenty20 International (T20I) debut against Papua New Guinea on 22 March 2019.

He was part of the Vanuatu cricket team in the men's tournament at the 2019 Pacific Games. In Vanuatu's opening match of the tournament, against New Caledonia, Obed took five wickets for ten runs. New Caledonia scored 23 runs, with Vanuatu winning by 10 wickets. In September 2019, he was named in Vanuatu's squad for the 2019 Malaysia Cricket World Cup Challenge League A tournament. Obed made his List A debut against Canada, in the Cricket World Cup Challenge League A tournament on 17 September 2019.
