= Andrew Mansale =

Vanuatuan cricketer

Personal information
- Born: 5 August 1988 (age 38)
- Batting: Right handed
- Bowling: Right arm offbreak

International information
- National side: Vanuatu
- T20I debut (cap 5): 22 March 2019 v PNG
- Last T20I: 24 August 2024 v Samoa

Career statistics
| Competition | T20I | LA |
|---|---|---|
| Matches | 34 | 16 |
| Runs scored | 699 | 280 |
| Batting average | 24.10 | 18.66 |
| 100s/50s | 0/5 | 0/1 |
| Top score | 82 | 68* |
| Balls bowled | 174 | 108 |
| Wickets | 13 | 0 |
| Bowling average | 15.30 | – |
| 5 wickets in innings | 1 | 0 |
| 10 wickets in match | 0 | 0 |
| Best bowling | 3/13 | – |
| Catches/stumpings | 16/– | 8/– |
Medal record
Representing Vanuatu
Men's Cricket
Pacific Games
| Silver medal – second place | 2019 Apia | Twenty20 International |
- Source: Cricinfo, 23 March 2025

Andrew Mansale (born 5 August 1988) is a Vanuatuan cricketer and a former captain of the Vanuatu national cricket team.

== Career ==
He played in the 2010 ICC World Cricket League Division Eight and 2013 and 2015 ICC World Cricket League Division Six tournaments. He captained the Vanuatu national cricket team at all three events.

In March 2018, he was named the captain of Vanuatu's squad for the 2018 ICC World Cricket League Division Four tournament in Malaysia. He captained Vanuatu's squad in Group A of the 2018–19 ICC T20 World Cup East Asia-Pacific Qualifier tournament.

In March 2019, he was named in the Vanuatuan squad for the Regional Finals of the 2018–19 ICC T20 World Cup East Asia-Pacific Qualifier tournament. He made his Twenty20 International (T20I) debut against Papua New Guinea on 22 March 2019.

In June 2019, he was selected to represent the Vanuatu cricket team in the men's tournament at the 2019 Pacific Games. In September 2019, he was named as the captain of Vanuatu's squad for the 2019 Malaysia Cricket World Cup Challenge League A tournament. He made his List A debut for Vanuatu, against Canada, in the Cricket World Cup Challenge League A tournament on 17 September 2019.
