= Cricket at the 2019 Pacific Games =

- Cricket format: Twenty20, Twenty20 International
- Host(s): Samoa
- Champions: Papua New Guinea (men's); Samoa (women's)
- Participants: 4 (both)
- Matches: 29 (14 men's, 15 women's)

Cricket at the 2019 Pacific Games was held between 8–13 July 2019 at the Faleata Oval Grounds in Apia, Samoa. A men's and women's Twenty20 event took place, with matches eligible to carry Twenty20 International status if both teams were members of the ICC and meet player eligibility criteria. Papua New Guinea won the gold medal in the men's after defeating Vanuatu by 32 runs in the final, but were beaten in the final of the women's event by Samoa.

== Medal summary ==
=== Medal table ===
* Host nation (Samoa)

Rank	Nation	Gold	Silver	Bronze	Total
1	Papua New Guinea (PNG)	1	1	0	2
2	Samoa (SAM)*	1	0	1	2
3	Vanuatu (VAN)	0	1	1	2
Totals (3 entries)		2	2	2	6

=== Results ===
Event	Gold	Silver	Bronze
Men	Papua New Guinea	Vanuatu	Samoa
Women	Samoa	Papua New Guinea	Vanuatu

== Participating teams ==
Women:

- Fiji
- Papua New Guinea
- Samoa
- Vanuatu

Men:

- New Caledonia
- Papua New Guinea
- Samoa
- Vanuatu

== Standings ==
=== Men ===
Team	P	W	L	T	NR	Pts	NRR
Papua New Guinea	6	6	0	0	0	12	
Vanuatu	6	3	3	0	0	6	
Samoa (H)	6	3	3	0	0	6	
New Caledonia	6	0	6	0	0	0	

(H) Host

- advanced to the gold medal match
- advanced to the bronze medal match

=== Women ===
Team	P	W	L	T	NR	Pts	NRR
Papua New Guinea	6	5	1	0	0	10	+1.028
Samoa (H)	6	5	1	0	0	10	+0.763
Vanuatu	6	2	4	0	0	4	+0.425
Fiji	6	0	6	0	0	0	–3.065

(H) Host

- advanced to the gold medal match
- advanced to the bronze medal match

== See also ==
- Cricket at the Pacific Games
