= Cricket at the 2019 Pacific Games – Men's tournament =

Men's cricket at the 2019 Pacific Games
- Venue: Tuanaimato Cricket Oval Ground
- Date: 8 July 2019 – 13 July 2019
- Nations: 4

Medalists
gold medal	Papua New Guinea (7th title)
silver medal	Vanuatu
bronze medal	Samoa

A men's Twenty20 cricket tournament at the 2019 Pacific Games in Apia, Samoa, was held from 8 to 13 July 2019 at the Faleata Oval Grounds. Following the International Cricket Council's decision to grant T20I status to all matches played between Associate Members after 1 January 2019, matches were eligible for Twenty20 International (T20I) status subject to both teams being members of the ICC and players passing eligibility criteria.

The team's involved in the men's tournament were the host nation Samoa, Papua New Guinea, Vanuatu and New Caledonia. Tonga and the Cook Islands were originally included, but withdrew and were replaced by New Caledonia. Matches involving New Caledonia did not have T20I status as they were not an Associate Member of the ICC.

In the opening match of the tournament, 49-year old Ofisa Tonu'u played for Samoa against Papua New Guinea. Tonu'u had previously played rugby union for New Zealand in the 1990s.

Papua New Guinea topped the group stage after winning all six of their matches, and were joined in the gold medal match by Vanuatu who finished ahead of Samoa on net run rate. Papua New Guinea won the gold medal after defeating Vanuatu by 32 runs in the final.

== Round-robin stage ==
=== Points table ===
Team	P	W	L	T	NR	Pts	NRR
Papua New Guinea	6	6	0	0	0	12	
Vanuatu	6	3	3	0	0	6	
Samoa (H)	6	3	3	0	0	6	
New Caledonia	6	0	6	0	0	0	

(H) Host

- advanced to the gold medal match
- advanced to the bronze medal match

=== Matches ===
8 July 2019
09:30
Scorecard

Samoa; 83/5 (15 overs)	v	Papua New Guinea; 29/1 (3.1 overs)
Sean Cotter 25 (22); Chad Soper 2/15 (4 overs)		Tony Ura 14 (12); Lester Evile 1/0 (1 over)

Papua New Guinea won by 9 wickets (DLS method)
Faleata Oval 1, Apia
Umpires: Mac Markia (Van) and Mervyn McGoon (Fij)

- Papua New Guinea won the toss and elected to field.
- Papua New Guinea were set a revised target of 24 runs from 5 overs due to rain.
- James Baker, Daniel Burgess, Sean Cotter, Lester Evile, Benjamin Mailata, Andrew Michael, Dom Michael, Faasao Mulivai, Samson Sola, Saumani Tiai, Ofisa Tonu'u (Sam) and Simon Atai (PNG) all made their T20I debuts.

8 July 2019
09:30

New Caledonia; 23 (10 overs)	v	Vanuatu; 25/0 (3.5 overs)
Simpson Obed 5/10

Vanuatu won by 10 wickets
Faleata Oval 2, Apia
Player of the match: Simpson Obed (Van)

- Vanuatu won the toss and elected to field.

9 July 2019
09:30
Scorecard

Vanuatu; 77 (17.5 overs)	v	Papua New Guinea; 78/7 (12.4 overs)
Jelany Chilia 23 (26); Damien Ravu 5/15 (4 overs)		Tony Ura 51* (37); Nalin Nipiko 5/19 (3.4 overs)

Papua New Guinea won by 3 wickets
Faleata Oval 3, Apia
Umpires: Uanase Aloniu (Sam) and Mervyn McGoon (Fij)

- Papua New Guinea won the toss and elected to field.
- Patrick Matautaava (Van) made his T20I debut.
- Damien Ravu became the first bowler for Papua New Guinea to take a five-wicket haul in T20Is.
- Nalin Nipiko became the first bowler for Vanuatu to take a five-wicket haul in T20Is.

9 July 2019
09:30

New Caledonia; 63 (17.2 overs)	v	Samoa; 67/0 (6.3 overs)

Samoa won by 10 wickets
Faleata Oval 2, Apia

9 July 2019
13:45

New Caledonia; 68 (18.4 overs)	v	Papua New Guinea; 73/4 (7.3 overs)

Papua New Guinea won by 6 wickets
Faleata Oval 2, Apia

9 July 2019
13:45
Scorecard

Vanuatu; 147/7 (20 overs)	v	Samoa; 148/8 (19.2 overs)
Clement Tommy 47 (39); Saumani Tiai 2/16 (4 overs)		Faasao Mulivai 48 (20); Andrew Mansale 2/24 (2 overs)

Samoa won by 2 wickets
Faleata Oval 1, Apia
Umpires: Mervyn McGoon (Fij) and Bri Olewale (PNG)

- Samoa won the toss and elected to field.

10 July 2019
09:30

New Caledonia; 44 (12.3 overs)	v	Vanuatu; 46/2 (4.2 overs)
Jelany Chilia 6/5 (3.3 overs)

Vanuatu won by 8 wickets
Faleata Oval 1, Apia
Player of the match: Jelany Chilia (Van)

- Vanuatu won the toss and elected to field.

10 July 2019
09:30
Scorecard

Samoa; 81 (17.5 overs)	v	Papua New Guinea; 83/3 (9.3 overs)
Sean Cotter 19 (19); Norman Vanua 4/21 (4 overs)		Tony Ura 58* (26); Lester Evile 1/19 (3 overs)

Papua New Guinea won by 7 wickets
Faleata Oval 2, Apia
Umpires: Mac Markia (Van) and Mervyn McGoon (Fij)

- Papua New Guinea won the toss and elected to field.

11 July 2019
13:45

New Caledonia; 44/8 (9 overs)	v	Samoa; 45/2 (5.2 overs)

Samoa won by 8 wickets
Faleata Oval 1, Apia

12 July 2019
09:30
Scorecard

Vanuatu; 180/5 (20 overs)	v	Samoa; 148/8 (20 overs)
Joshua Rasu 49 (29); Daniel Burgess 3/47 (4 overs)		Dom Michael 55* (41); Andrew Mansale 3/13 (4 overs)

Vanuatu won by 32 runs
Faleata Oval 3, Apia
Umpires: Uala Kaisala (Sam) and Bri Olewale (PNG)

- Samoa won the toss and elected to field.

12 July 2019
09:30

New Caledonia; 56 (17.3 overs)	v	Papua New Guinea; 59/0 (3 overs)

Papua New Guinea won by 10 wickets
Faleata Oval 4, Apia

12 July 2019
13:45
Scorecard

Papua New Guinea; 181 (19.5 overs)	v	Vanuatu; 122/9 (20 overs)
Charles Amini 51 (37); Joshua Rasu 5/36 (2.5 overs)		Joshua Rasu 40 (39); Assad Vala 3/27 (4 overs)

Papua New Guinea won by 59 runs
Faleata Oval 2, Apia
Umpires: Uala Kaisala (Sam) and Mervyn McGoon (Fij)

- Vanuatu won the toss and elected to field.
- Joshua Rasu (Van) took his first five-wicket haul in T20Is.

== Finals ==
=== Bronze medal match ===
13 July 2019
09:30
Scorecard

Samoa; 241/5 (20 overs)	v	New Caledonia; 84/9 (20 overs)

Samoa won by 157 runs
Faleata Oval 1, Apia

=== Gold medal match ===
13 July 2019
13:45
Scorecard

Papua New Guinea; 137 (18.4 overs)	v	Vanuatu; 105 (19.1 overs)
Charles Amini 47 (34); Nalin Nipiko 4/29 (3.4 overs)		Nalin Nipiko 33 (36); Norman Vanua 5/17 (4 overs)

Papua New Guinea won by 32 runs
Faleata Oval 2, Apia
Umpires: Mervyn McGoon (Fij) and Bri Olewale (PNG)
Player of the match: Nalin Nipiko (Van)

- Vanuatu won the toss and elected to field.
- Norman Vanua (PNG) took his first five-wicket haul in T20Is.

== See also ==
- Cricket at the 2019 Pacific Games – Women's tournament
