= 2027 Cricket World Cup qualification =

Qualification process for the 2027 Cricket World Cup

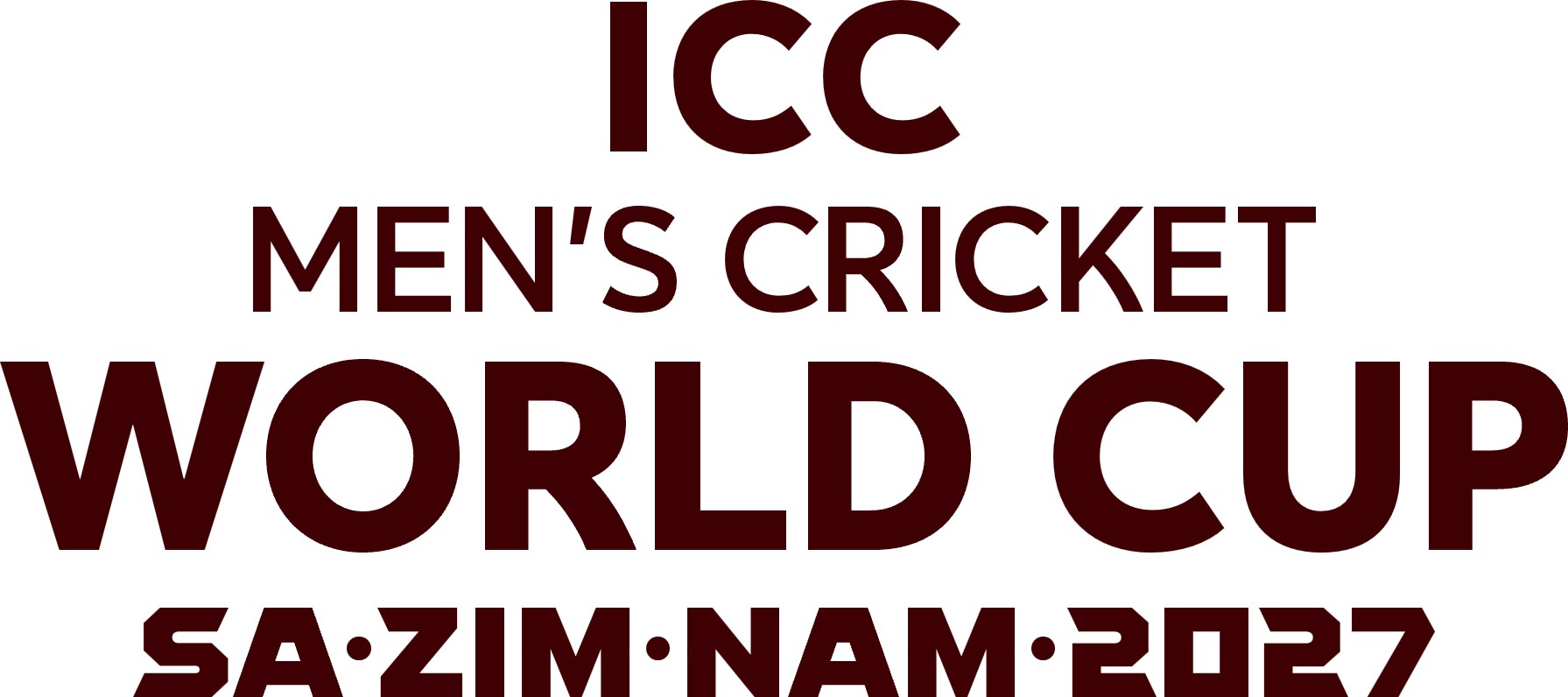
- Tournament logo
- Dates: 15 February 2024 – 2027
- Administrator: International Cricket Council
- Cricket format: One Day International; List A
- Participants: 36
- Matches: 289

The 2027 Cricket World Cup qualification is an ongoing process by which teams will qualify for the 2027 Cricket World Cup. A series of competitions will determine which teams will take part in the tournament.

== Format ==
The eight top-ranked teams in the ICC Men's ODI Team Rankings, along with the 2027 Full Member hosts will automatically qualify for the tournament. Four teams will qualify from the CWC Qualifier. The CWC Challenge League Play-off served to allow new teams from the ICC Men's T20I Team Rankings to enter the qualification cycle. 13th to 28th placed teams from the previous cycle, along with the 4 teams advanced from the Challenge League Play-off, entered the 20-team qualification cycle to compete for the remaining 4 spots in the World Cup.

The next two teams in the ODI rankings (excluding the teams already qualified) will directly qualify for the CWC Qualifier. The remaining 20 sides are divided into two leagues, the CWC League 2 (8 teams) and the CWC Challenge League (12 teams). Based on the results of the leagues, teams will either directly qualify for the CWC Qualifier, be eliminated from the World Cup qualification, or advance to the CWC Qualifier Play-off through which they could qualify for the CWC Qualifier. The Qualifier Play-off will also determine promotion and relegation between the two leagues.

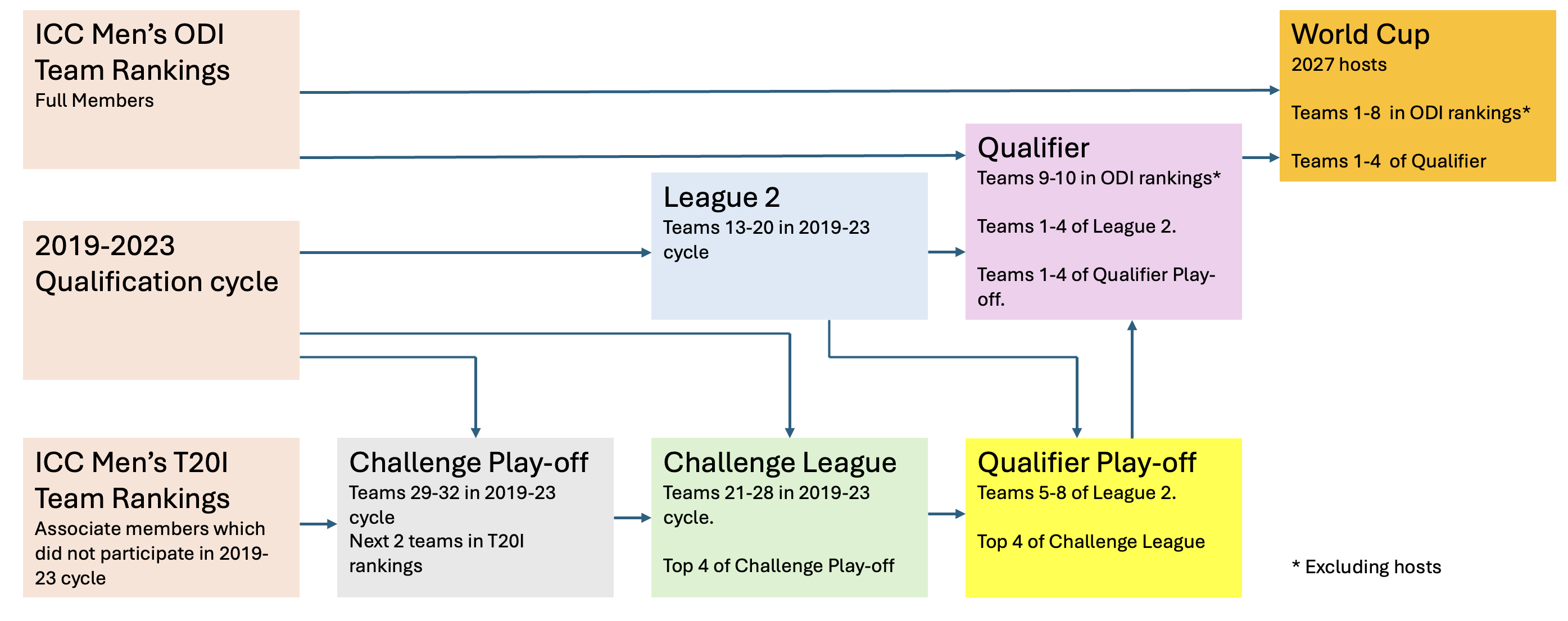
Qualification pathway for the 2027 Cricket World Cup.

=== Participating teams ===
National teams qualification status in the 2027 Men's Cricket World Cup. Qualified directly (hosts or via ODI Rankings) Teams that entered the qualifier directly via ODI Rankings Teams whose qualification status is yet to be decided Participated in the qualification process but failed to qualify ICC members who did not enter the qualification process

In November 2021, the ICC announced that there would not be a second edition of the Super League. Teams were allocated to the two leagues based on the results from the previous World Cup qualification cycle.

List of teams participating in the 2027 CWC qualification
Method of qualification	Date of qualification	Final standings in previous cycle	Number of teams	Teams	Placement in 2027 cycle
Hosts	16 November 2021	ICC Full Members	2	South Africa	2027 Cricket World Cup
Hosts	16 November 2021	ICC Full Members	2	Zimbabwe	2027 Cricket World Cup
ICC Men's ODI Team Rankings	30 September 2026	Top 8 teams, excluding the hosts	8	Afghanistan	2027 Cricket World Cup
ICC Men's ODI Team Rankings	30 September 2026	Top 8 teams, excluding the hosts	8	Australia	2027 Cricket World Cup
ICC Men's ODI Team Rankings	30 September 2026	Top 8 teams, excluding the hosts	8	Bangladesh	2027 Cricket World Cup
ICC Men's ODI Team Rankings	30 September 2026	Top 8 teams, excluding the hosts	8	England	2027 Cricket World Cup
ICC Men's ODI Team Rankings	30 September 2026	Top 8 teams, excluding the hosts	8	India	2027 Cricket World Cup
ICC Men's ODI Team Rankings	30 September 2026	Top 8 teams, excluding the hosts	8	New Zealand	2027 Cricket World Cup
ICC Men's ODI Team Rankings	30 September 2026	Top 8 teams, excluding the hosts	8	Pakistan	2027 Cricket World Cup
ICC Men's ODI Team Rankings	30 September 2026	Top 8 teams, excluding the hosts	8	Sri Lanka	2027 Cricket World Cup
ICC Men's ODI Team Rankings	30 September 2026	Next 2 teams, excluding the hosts	2	Ireland	2027 Cricket World Cup Qualifier
ICC Men's ODI Team Rankings	30 September 2026	Next 2 teams, excluding the hosts	2	West Indies	2027 Cricket World Cup Qualifier
2019–2023 World Cup qualification cycle	30 July 2020 – 14 May 2023	13th (Super League)	1	Netherlands	2024–2026 League 2
2019–2023 World Cup qualification cycle	14 August 2019 – 16 March 2023	14th–16th (Top 3 of League 2)	3	Nepal	2024–2026 League 2
2019–2023 World Cup qualification cycle	14 August 2019 – 16 March 2023	14th–16th (Top 3 of League 2)	3	Oman	2024–2026 League 2
2019–2023 World Cup qualification cycle	14 August 2019 – 16 March 2023	14th–16th (Top 3 of League 2)	3	Scotland	2024–2026 League 2
2019–2023 World Cup qualification cycle	26 March – 5 April 2023	17th–20th (Top 4 of Qualifier Play-off)	4	Canada	2024–2026 League 2
2019–2023 World Cup qualification cycle	26 March – 5 April 2023	17th–20th (Top 4 of Qualifier Play-off)	4	Namibia	2024–2026 League 2
2019–2023 World Cup qualification cycle	26 March – 5 April 2023	17th–20th (Top 4 of Qualifier Play-off)	4	United Arab Emirates	2024–2026 League 2
2019–2023 World Cup qualification cycle	26 March – 5 April 2023	17th–20th (Top 4 of Qualifier Play-off)	4	United States	2024–2026 League 2
2019–2023 World Cup qualification cycle	26 March – 5 April 2023	21st–22nd (Bottom 2 of Qualifier Play-off)	2	Jersey	2024–2026 Challenge League (Top 4 teams from the Challenge Play-off also qualified)
2019–2023 World Cup qualification cycle	26 March – 5 April 2023	21st–22nd (Bottom 2 of Qualifier Play-off)	2	Papua New Guinea	2024–2026 Challenge League (Top 4 teams from the Challenge Play-off also qualified)
2019–2023 World Cup qualification cycle	16 September 2019 – 13 December 2022	23rd–28th (Top 6 of Challenge League)	6	Denmark	2024–2026 Challenge League (Top 4 teams from the Challenge Play-off also qualified)
2019–2023 World Cup qualification cycle	16 September 2019 – 13 December 2022	23rd–28th (Top 6 of Challenge League)	6	Hong Kong	2024–2026 Challenge League (Top 4 teams from the Challenge Play-off also qualified)
2019–2023 World Cup qualification cycle	16 September 2019 – 13 December 2022	23rd–28th (Top 6 of Challenge League)	6	Kenya	2024–2026 Challenge League (Top 4 teams from the Challenge Play-off also qualified)
2019–2023 World Cup qualification cycle	16 September 2019 – 13 December 2022	23rd–28th (Top 6 of Challenge League)	6	Qatar	2024–2026 Challenge League (Top 4 teams from the Challenge Play-off also qualified)
2019–2023 World Cup qualification cycle	16 September 2019 – 13 December 2022	23rd–28th (Top 6 of Challenge League)	6	Singapore	2024–2026 Challenge League (Top 4 teams from the Challenge Play-off also qualified)
2019–2023 World Cup qualification cycle	16 September 2019 – 13 December 2022	23rd–28th (Top 6 of Challenge League)	6	Uganda	2024–2026 Challenge League (Top 4 teams from the Challenge Play-off also qualified)
2019–2023 World Cup qualification cycle	16 September 2019 – 13 December 2022	29th–32nd (Bottom 4 of Challenge League)	4	Bermuda	2024 Challenge League Play-off (Outside the current qualification cycle)
2019–2023 World Cup qualification cycle	16 September 2019 – 13 December 2022	29th–32nd (Bottom 4 of Challenge League)	4	Italy	2024 Challenge League Play-off (Outside the current qualification cycle)
2019–2023 World Cup qualification cycle	16 September 2019 – 13 December 2022	29th–32nd (Bottom 4 of Challenge League)	4	Malaysia	2024 Challenge League Play-off (Outside the current qualification cycle)
2019–2023 World Cup qualification cycle	16 September 2019 – 13 December 2022	29th–32nd (Bottom 4 of Challenge League)	4	Vanuatu	2024 Challenge League Play-off (Outside the current qualification cycle)
ICC Men's T20I Team Rankings	30 September 2023	Top 4 teams, didn't participate in the previous cycle	4	Bahrain	2024 Challenge League Play-off (Outside the current qualification cycle)
ICC Men's T20I Team Rankings	30 September 2023	Top 4 teams, didn't participate in the previous cycle	4	Kuwait	2024 Challenge League Play-off (Outside the current qualification cycle)
ICC Men's T20I Team Rankings	30 September 2023	Top 4 teams, didn't participate in the previous cycle	4	Saudi Arabia	2024 Challenge League Play-off (Outside the current qualification cycle)
ICC Men's T20I Team Rankings	30 September 2023	Top 4 teams, didn't participate in the previous cycle	4	Tanzania	2024 Challenge League Play-off (Outside the current qualification cycle)
Total			36		

== Qualified teams ==
South Africa and Zimbabwe as full-member co-hosts have automatically qualified for the final stages of the tournament.

List of teams qualified for the 2027 CWC
Teams	Method of qualification	Date of qualification	Venues	Number of teams	Total times qualified	Last time qualified	Previous best performance
South Africa	Full Member Hosts	16 November 2021	—N/a	2	10	2023	Semi-Finals (1992, 1999, 2007, 2015, 2023)
Zimbabwe	Full Member Hosts	16 November 2021	—N/a	2	10	2015	Super 6 (1999, 2003)
Afghanistan	ICC Men's ODI Team Rankings (Top 8 teams, excluding the hosts)	30 September 2026	—N/a	8	4	2023	Group stage (2015, 2019, 2023)
Australia	ICC Men's ODI Team Rankings (Top 8 teams, excluding the hosts)	30 September 2026	—N/a	8	14	2023	Champions (1987, 1999, 2003, 2007, 2015, 2023)
Bangladesh	ICC Men's ODI Team Rankings (Top 8 teams, excluding the hosts)	30 September 2026	—N/a	8	8	2023	Quarter-Finals (2015)
England	ICC Men's ODI Team Rankings (Top 8 teams, excluding the hosts)	30 September 2026	—N/a	8	14	2023	Champions (2019)
India	ICC Men's ODI Team Rankings (Top 8 teams, excluding the hosts)	30 September 2026	—N/a	8	14	2023	Champions (1983, 2011)
New Zealand	ICC Men's ODI Team Rankings (Top 8 teams, excluding the hosts)	30 September 2026	—N/a	8	14	2023	Runners-up (2015, 2019)
Pakistan	ICC Men's ODI Team Rankings (Top 8 teams, excluding the hosts)	30 September 2026	—N/a	8	14	2023	Champions (1992)
Sri Lanka	ICC Men's ODI Team Rankings (Top 8 teams, excluding the hosts)	30 September 2026	—N/a	8	14	2023	Champions (1996)
TBD	2027 Cricket World Cup Qualifier	26 February – 21 March 2027	South Africa and Namibia	4			
TBD	2027 Cricket World Cup Qualifier	26 February – 21 March 2027	South Africa and Namibia	4			
TBD	2027 Cricket World Cup Qualifier	26 February – 21 March 2027	South Africa and Namibia	4			
TBD	2027 Cricket World Cup Qualifier	26 February – 21 March 2027	South Africa and Namibia	4			
Total				14			

=== Eliminated teams ===
List of teams eliminated from the 2027 CWC qualification
Tournament	Date	Venue	Eliminations	Teams
Challenge Play-off	22 February – 3 March 2024	Malaysia	4	Bermuda
Challenge Play-off	22 February – 3 March 2024	Malaysia	4	Malaysia
Challenge Play-off	22 February – 3 March 2024	Malaysia	4	Saudi Arabia
Challenge Play-off	22 February – 3 March 2024	Malaysia	4	Vanuatu
Challenge League	15 February 2024 – December 2026	Various	8	Bahrain
Challenge League	15 February 2024 – December 2026	Various	8	Denmark
Challenge League	15 February 2024 – December 2026	Various	8	Hong Kong
Challenge League	15 February 2024 – December 2026	Various	8	Kenya
Challenge League	15 February 2024 – December 2026	Various	8	Papua New Guinea
Challenge League	15 February 2024 – December 2026	Various	8	Qatar
Challenge League	15 February 2024 – December 2026	Various	8	Singapore
Challenge League	15 February 2024 – December 2026	Various	8	Tanzania
Qualifier Play-off	4–21 December 2026	TBA	4	TBD
Qualifier Play-off	4–21 December 2026	TBA	4	TBD
Qualifier Play-off	4–21 December 2026	TBA	4	TBD
Qualifier Play-off	4–21 December 2026	TBA	4	TBD
Qualifier	26 February – 21 March 2027	TBA	6	TBD
Qualifier	26 February – 21 March 2027	TBA	6	TBD
Qualifier	26 February – 21 March 2027	TBA	6	TBD
Qualifier	26 February – 21 March 2027	TBA	6	TBD
Qualifier	26 February – 21 March 2027	TBA	6	TBD
Qualifier	26 February – 21 March 2027	TBA	6	TBD
Total			22	

== Supplementary tournament ==
Eight teams took part in the Challenge League Play-off. The play-off served as an entry tournament for the three-year qualification cycle. The top four teams from the tournament progressed to the 2024–2026 Cricket World Cup Challenge League.

=== 2024 CWC Challenge Play-off ===
Tournament outcome
Outcome	Berths	Teams
Advanced to the Challenge League	4	Bahrain
Advanced to the Challenge League	4	Italy
Advanced to the Challenge League	4	Kuwait
Advanced to the Challenge League	4	Tanzania
Eliminated from the CWC qualification	4	Bermuda
Eliminated from the CWC qualification	4	Malaysia
Eliminated from the CWC qualification	4	Saudi Arabia
Eliminated from the CWC qualification	4	Vanuatu
Total	8	

Group A

Pos	Team	Pld	W	L	NR	Pts	NRR	Qualification
1	Italy	3	2	1	0	4	0.574	Advanced to the Super 6
2	Kuwait	3	2	1	0	4	0.292	Advanced to the Super 6
3	Bermuda	3	1	2	0	2	−1.108	Advanced to the Super 6
4	Saudi Arabia	3	1	2	0	2	0.298	Eliminated

Source: ESPNcricinfo
Rules for classification: 1) Points; 2) Wins; 3) Results of games between tied teams; 4) Net run rate

Group B

Pos	Team	Pld	W	L	NR	Pts	NRR	Qualification
1	Bahrain	3	2	1	0	4	0.713	Advanced to the Super 6
2	Tanzania	3	2	1	0	4	0.633	Advanced to the Super 6
3	Vanuatu	3	1	2	0	2	−0.791	Advanced to the Super 6
4	Malaysia	3	1	2	0	2	−0.742	Eliminated

Source: ESPNcricinfo
Rules for classification: 1) Points; 2) Wins; 3) Results of games between tied teams; 4) Net run rate

Super 6 stage

Pos	Team	Pld	W	L	NR	Pts	NRR	Qualification
1	Kuwait	5	5	0	0	10	2.215	Qualified for the 2024–2026 Cricket World Cup Challenge League
2	Italy	5	3	2	0	6	1.163	Qualified for the 2024–2026 Cricket World Cup Challenge League
3	Bahrain	5	3	2	0	6	0.565	Qualified for the 2024–2026 Cricket World Cup Challenge League
4	Tanzania	5	3	2	0	6	−0.356	Qualified for the 2024–2026 Cricket World Cup Challenge League
5	Vanuatu	5	1	4	0	2	−1.999	Eliminated
6	Bermuda	5	0	5	0	0	−1.590	Eliminated

Source: ESPNcricinfo
Rules for classification: 1) Points; 2) Wins; 3) Results of games between tied teams; 4) Net run rate

== Qualifying leagues ==
=== 2024–2026 CWC League 2 ===
League outcome
Outcome	Berths	Qualified teams
Advanced to the Qualifier	4	Netherlands
Advanced to the Qualifier	4	Oman
Advanced to the Qualifier	4	Scotland
Advanced to the Qualifier	4	United States
Advanced to the Qualifier Play-off	4	Canada
Advanced to the Qualifier Play-off	4	Namibia
Advanced to the Qualifier Play-off	4	Nepal
Advanced to the Qualifier Play-off	4	United Arab Emirates
Total	8	

Pos	Team	Pld	W	L	NR	Pts	NRR	Qualification
1	United States	36	24	11	1	49	0.653	Advanced to the 2027 Cricket World Cup Qualifier
2	Scotland	36	19	10	7	45	0.710	Advanced to the 2027 Cricket World Cup Qualifier
3	Netherlands	36	20	12	4	44	0.315	Advanced to the 2027 Cricket World Cup Qualifier
4	Oman	36	15	18	3	33	−0.224	Advanced to the 2027 Cricket World Cup Qualifier
5	Namibia	36	15	18	3	33	−0.278	Advanced to the 2027 Cricket World Cup Qualifier Play-off
6	Nepal	36	14	20	2	30	0.000	Advanced to the 2027 Cricket World Cup Qualifier Play-off
7	Canada	36	12	19	5	29	−0.330	Advanced to the 2027 Cricket World Cup Qualifier Play-off
8	United Arab Emirates	36	11	22	3	25	−0.778	Advanced to the 2027 Cricket World Cup Qualifier Play-off

Source: Cricinfo
Rules for classification: 1) Points; 2) Wins; 3) Net run rate; 4) Head-to-head record

=== 2024–2026 CWC Challenge League ===
League outcome
Outcome	Berths	Teams
Advanced to the Qualifier Play-off	4	Italy
Advanced to the Qualifier Play-off	4	Jersey
Advanced to the Qualifier Play-off	4	Kuwait
Advanced to the Qualifier Play-off	4	Uganda
Eliminated from the CWC Qualification	8	Bahrain
Eliminated from the CWC Qualification	8	Denmark
Eliminated from the CWC Qualification	8	Hong Kong
Eliminated from the CWC Qualification	8	Singapore
Eliminated from the CWC Qualification	8	Tanzania
Eliminated from the CWC Qualification	8	Kenya
Eliminated from the CWC Qualification	8	Papua New Guinea
Eliminated from the CWC Qualification	8	Qatar
Total	12	

League A

Pos	Team	Pld	W	L	T	NR	Pts	NRR	Qualification
1	Jersey	15	12	2	1	0	25	1.895	Advanced to the 2026 Cricket World Cup Qualifier Play-off
2	Kuwait	15	9	4	1	1	20	0.467	Advanced to the 2026 Cricket World Cup Qualifier Play-off
3	Denmark	15	6	8	0	1	13	−0.269	
4	Papua New Guinea	15	5	8	0	2	12	−1.076	
5	Qatar	15	4	9	0	2	10	−0.680	Relegated to the 2027 Cricket World Cup Challenge League Play-off
6	Kenya	15	4	9	0	2	10	−0.685	Relegated to the 2027 Cricket World Cup Challenge League Play-off

Source: Cricinfo
Rules for classification: 1) Points; 2) Wins; 3) Net run rate; 4) Results of games between tied teams

League B

Pos	Team	Pld	W	L	NR	Pts	NRR	Qualification
1	Italy	15	12	1	2	26	2.152	Advanced to the 2026 Cricket World Cup Qualifier Play-off
2	Uganda	15	10	3	2	22	1.204	Advanced to the 2026 Cricket World Cup Qualifier Play-off
3	Hong Kong	15	9	4	2	20	0.382	
4	Bahrain	15	6	8	1	13	−0.249	
5	Tanzania	15	3	10	2	8	−1.000	Relegated to the 2027 Cricket World Cup Challenge League Play-off
6	Singapore	15	0	14	1	1	−2.318	Relegated to the 2027 Cricket World Cup Challenge League Play-off

Source: Cricinfo
Rules for classification: 1) Points; 2) Wins; 3) Net run rate; 4) Results of games between tied teams

== Qualifying tournaments ==
=== 2026 Cricket World Cup Qualifier Play-off ===
Eight teams will take part in the play-off: the bottom four teams from the 2024–2026 Cricket World Cup League 2 along with the top two teams each in Groups A and B of the 2024–2026 Cricket World Cup Challenge League. The top four teams from this tournament progress to the Qualifier. The tournament will be held from 4 to 22 December 2026 with all matches played with One Day Internationals (ODI) status.

Teams qualified
Means of qualification	Date	Venue	Berths	Qualified teams
League 2 (bottom 4 teams)	15 February 2024 – 4 November 2026	Various	4	Canada
League 2 (bottom 4 teams)	15 February 2024 – 4 November 2026	Various	4	Namibia
League 2 (bottom 4 teams)	15 February 2024 – 4 November 2026	Various	4	Nepal
League 2 (bottom 4 teams)	15 February 2024 – 4 November 2026	Various	4	United Arab Emirates
Challenge League A (Top 2 teams)	25 September 2024 – 31 October 2026	Various	2	Jersey
Challenge League A (Top 2 teams)	25 September 2024 – 31 October 2026	Various	2	Kuwait
Challenge League B (Top 2 teams)	6 November 2024 – 18 August 2026	Various	2	Italy
Challenge League B (Top 2 teams)	6 November 2024 – 18 August 2026	Various	2	Uganda
Total			8	

League outcome
Outcome	Berths	Qualified teams
Advanced to Qualifier	4	TBD
Advanced to Qualifier	4	TBD
Advanced to Qualifier	4	TBD
Advanced to Qualifier	4	TBD
Eliminated from CWC Qualification	4	TBD
Eliminated from CWC Qualification	4	TBD
Eliminated from CWC Qualification	4	TBD
Eliminated from CWC Qualification	4	TBD
Total	8	

=== 2027 Cricket World Cup Qualifier ===
The Qualifier will feature ten teams in total: the 11th and 12th ranked teams; the top four teams from the League 2, and the top four teams from the qualifier play-off. The top four teams from this tournament will qualify for the World Cup.

Tournament shall be played from 22 February to 23 March 2027.

Qualified teams
Means of qualification	Date	Venue	Berths	Qualified teams
ICC Men's ODI Rankings (Next 2 ranked teams)	30 September 2026	Various	2	Ireland
ICC Men's ODI Rankings (Next 2 ranked teams)	30 September 2026	Various	2	West Indies
League 2 (Top 4 teams)	15 February 2024 – 4 December 2026	Various	4	Netherlands
League 2 (Top 4 teams)	15 February 2024 – 4 December 2026	Various	4	Oman
League 2 (Top 4 teams)	15 February 2024 – 4 December 2026	Various	4	Scotland
League 2 (Top 4 teams)	15 February 2024 – 4 December 2026	Various	4	United States
Qualifier Play-off (Top 4 teams)	4–21 December 2026	TBD	4	TBD
Qualifier Play-off (Top 4 teams)	4–21 December 2026	TBD	4	TBD
Qualifier Play-off (Top 4 teams)	4–21 December 2026	TBD	4	TBD
Qualifier Play-off (Top 4 teams)	4–21 December 2026	TBD	4	TBD
Total			10	

CWC Qualifier outcome
Outcome	Berths	Qualified teams
Advanced to CWC	4	TBD
Advanced to CWC	4	TBD
Advanced to CWC	4	TBD
Advanced to CWC	4	TBD
Eliminated from CWC Qualification	6	TBD
Eliminated from CWC Qualification	6	TBD
Eliminated from CWC Qualification	6	TBD
Eliminated from CWC Qualification	6	TBD
Eliminated from CWC Qualification	6	TBD
Eliminated from CWC Qualification	6	TBD
Total	10	

== See also ==
- 2026 Men's T20 World Cup qualification
- 2028 Men's T20 World Cup qualification
