= 2027 Cricket World Cup Qualifier =

2027 cricket tournament qualifier

2027 ICC Men's Cricket World Cup Qualifier
- Dates: 26 February – 21 March 2027
- Administrator: International Cricket Council
- Cricket format: One Day International
- Tournament format(s): Group stage and Knockout stage
- Host(s): Namibia; South Africa
- Participants: 10
- Matches: 23
- Official website: International Cricket Council

The 2027 ICC Men's Cricket World Cup Qualifier will be the thirteenth edition of the Cricket World Cup Qualifier, which will take place from 26 February to 21 March 2027 in Namibia and South Africa. The tournament will serve as the final stage of the qualification process for the 2027 Cricket World Cup.

In a new process this year, the winner of the qualifier enters the second round of the World Cup, while the other three teams in the qualifier enter the first round. All the matches will be played with One Day International status.

== Qualification ==
The tournament will feature ten teams: the two teams ranked 9th and 10th (excluding the hosts, South Africa and Zimbabwe) in the ICC Men's ODI Team Rankings who failed to qualify directly, along with the top four teams from the 2024–2026 Cricket World Cup League 2, and the top four teams from the 2026 Cricket World Cup Qualifier Play-off.

Teams qualified for the 2027 Cricket World Cup Qualifier
Means of qualification	Date of qualification	Host(s)	Berths	Qualified teams
ODI Team Rankings (Next 2 ranked teams)	30 September 2026	—N/a	2	Ireland
ODI Team Rankings (Next 2 ranked teams)	30 September 2026	—N/a	2	West Indies
League 2 (Top 4 teams)	15 February 2024 – 4 November 2026	Various	4	Netherlands
League 2 (Top 4 teams)	15 February 2024 – 4 November 2026	Various	4	Oman
League 2 (Top 4 teams)	15 February 2024 – 4 November 2026	Various	4	Scotland
League 2 (Top 4 teams)	15 February 2024 – 4 November 2026	Various	4	United States
Qualifier Play-off (Top 4 teams)	4–21 December 2026	Nepal	4	(To be determined) TBD
Qualifier Play-off (Top 4 teams)	4–21 December 2026	Nepal	4	(To be determined) TBD
Qualifier Play-off (Top 4 teams)	4–21 December 2026	Nepal	4	(To be determined) TBD
Qualifier Play-off (Top 4 teams)	4–21 December 2026	Nepal	4	(To be determined) TBD
Total			10	

== Group stage ==
=== Group A ===
Group A standings
Pos	Team	Pld	W	L	NR	Pts	NRR	Qualification
1	To be determined	0	0	0	0	0	—	Advance to the Knockout stage and qualified for the 2027 Cricket World Cup
2	To be determined	0	0	0	0	0	—	Advance to the Knockout stage and qualified for the 2027 Cricket World Cup
3	To be determined	0	0	0	0	0	—	
4	To be determined	0	0	0	0	0	—	
5	To be determined	0	0	0	0	0	—	

First match(es) will be played: 26 February 2027. Source:

=== Group B ===
Group B standings
Pos	Team	Pld	W	L	NR	Pts	NRR	Qualification
1	To be determined	0	0	0	0	0	—	Advance to the Knockout stage and qualified for the 2027 Cricket World Cup
2	To be determined	0	0	0	0	0	—	Advance to the Knockout stage and qualified for the 2027 Cricket World Cup
3	To be determined	0	0	0	0	0	—	
4	To be determined	0	0	0	0	0	—	
5	To be determined	0	0	0	0	0	—	

First match(es) will be played: 26 February 2027. Source:

== Knockout stage ==
=== Bracket ===
Semi-finals
A1	Winner of Group A
B2	Runner-up of Group B
B1	Winner of Group B
A2	Runner-up of Group A

Final
SF1W	Winner of Semi-final 1
SF2W	Winner of Semi-final 2

=== Semi-finals ===
Semi-final 1
March 2027

Winner of Group A	v	Runner-up of Group B

TBD

Semi-final 2
March 2027

Winner of Group B	v	Runner-up of Group A

TBD

=== Final ===
21 March 2027

Winner of Semi-final 1	v	Winner of Semi-final 2

TBD

== See also ==
- 2027 Cricket World Cup
- 2027 Cricket World Cup qualification
- 2024–2026 Cricket World Cup League 2
- 2026 Cricket World Cup Qualifier Play-off
- 2024–2026 Cricket World Cup Challenge League
- 2024 Cricket World Cup Challenge League Play-off
