= Cricket World Cup Qualifier Play-off =

International cricket tournament

ICC Cricket World Cup Qualifier Play-off
- Administrator: International Cricket Council
- Format: One-Day International
- First edition: 2023
- Next edition: 2026
- Tournament format: Round-robin
- Current champion: United States (1st title)
- Most successful: United States (1 title)
- Qualification: Cricket World Cup Qualifier: 2023 (2 berths)
- 2026

The Cricket World Cup Qualifier Play-off is a One-Day International (ODI) cricket tournament that forms part of the qualification process for the Cricket World Cup. The tournament was introduced in 2018, when a new qualification pathway was announced prior to the 2023 Cricket World Cup. The first edition was held in 2023.

A number of teams as specified for each qualification pathway qualify for the Qualifier Play-off from the League 2 and Challenge League, this provides an opportunity for even associate teams without ODI status to play full One-Day International matches. For the 2023 tournament, the bottom four teams from League 2 and two teams from Challenge League qualified for the tournament. While for the 2027 edition, four teams from League 2 and Challenge League respectively qualify.

== Teams' performances ==
Legend

- Teams that qualified for the next stage due to their performance in a particular edition are underlined.
- 1st Champions
- 2nd Runners-up
- Host

Team	2023	2026
Team	(Namibia)	(Nepal)
Africa
Namibia	3rd	TBD
Uganda	-	TBD
Americas
Canada	4th	TBD
United States	1st	-
Asia
Kuwait	-	TBD
Nepal	-	TBD
United Arab Emirates	2nd	TBD
East Asia - Pacific
Papua New Guinea	6th	-
Europe
Jersey	5th	TBD
Italy	-	TBD

== See also ==
- Cricket World Cup Qualifier
- ICC Cricket World Cup Super League
- ICC Cricket World Cup League 2
