= 2026 Cricket World Cup Qualifier Play-off =

2026 cricket tournament

2026 ICC Men's Cricket World Cup Qualifier Play-off
- Dates: 4 – 21 December 2026
- Administrator: International Cricket Council
- Cricket format: One Day International
- Tournament format: Round-robin tournament
- Host: Nepal
- Participants: 8
- Matches: 28
- Official website: International Cricket Council

The 2026 ICC Men's Cricket World Cup Qualifier Play-off will be the second edition of the Cricket World Cup Qualifier Play-off, a cricket tournament which forms part of the 2027 Cricket World Cup qualification process. The tournament will take place in Nepal in December 2026.

All of the matches will be played with One Day International (ODI) status, regardless of whether or not a team had ODI status prior to the start of the event. As a result, Italy, Kuwait and Uganda will play their first ever matches with ODI status.

== Teams and qualification ==
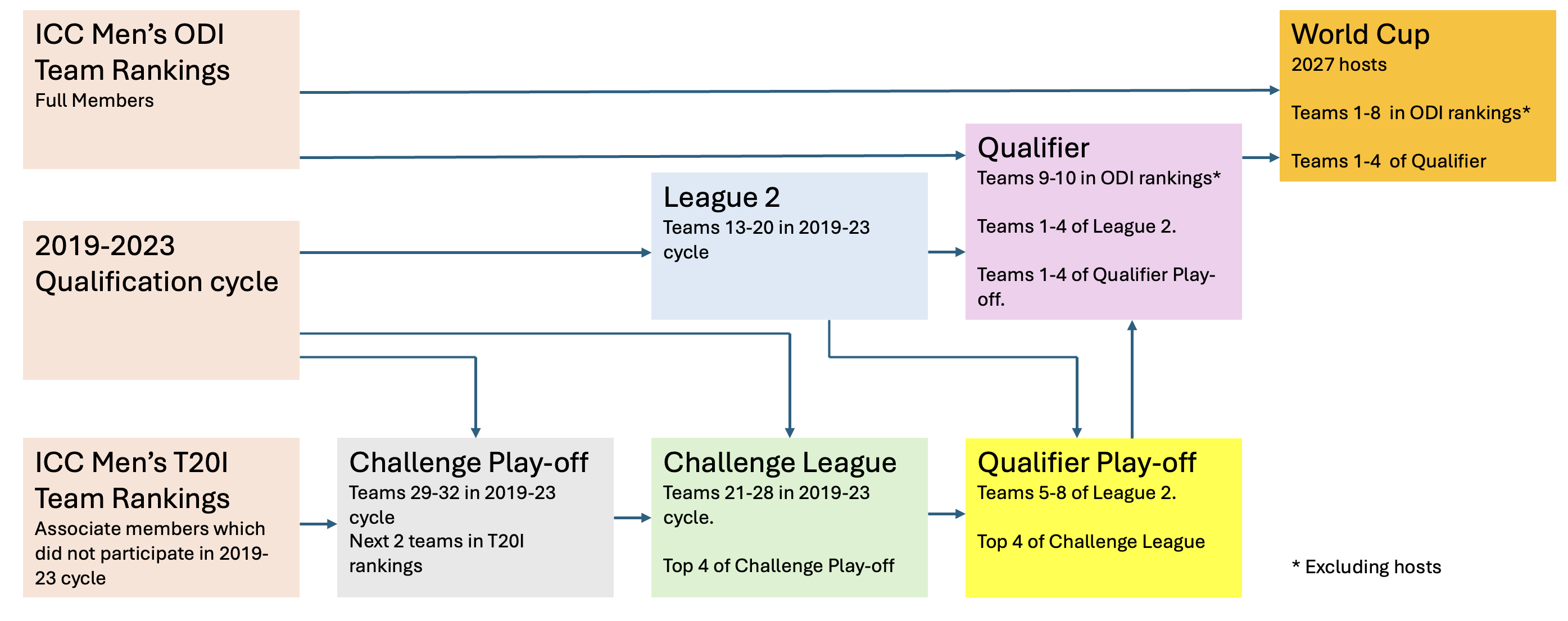
Qualification pathway for the 2027 Cricket World Cup.

Eight teams qualified for the tournament: the bottom four teams from the 2024–2026 Cricket World Cup League 2 along with the top two teams from both groups from the 2024–2026 Cricket World Cup Challenge League. The top four teams will advance to the 2027 Cricket World Cup Qualifier for a chance to participate in the 2027 Cricket World Cup. The other teams had no remaining means of qualifying.

Teams qualified for the 2026 Cricket World Cup Qualifier Play-off
Means of qualification	Date	Venue	Berths	Qualified teams
League 2 (Bottom 4 teams)	15 February 2024 – 4 November 2026	Various	4	Canada
League 2 (Bottom 4 teams)	15 February 2024 – 4 November 2026	Various	4	Namibia
League 2 (Bottom 4 teams)	15 February 2024 – 4 November 2026	Various	4	Nepal
League 2 (Bottom 4 teams)	15 February 2024 – 4 November 2026	Various	4	United Arab Emirates
Challenge League A (Top 2 teams)	25 September 2024 – 31 October 2026	Various	2	Jersey
Challenge League A (Top 2 teams)	25 September 2024 – 31 October 2026	Various	2	Kuwait
Challenge League B (Top 2 teams)	6 November 2024 – 18 August 2026	Various	2	Italy
Challenge League B (Top 2 teams)	6 November 2024 – 18 August 2026	Various	2	Uganda
Total			8	

== Venues ==
The 2026 ICC Men's Cricket World Cup Qualifier Play-off will be hosted in Nepal, from 4 to 21 December 2026. Tribhuvan University International Cricket Ground and Mulpani International Cricket Ground are the two venues.

Venues in Kathmandu District, Nepal.
A map of Nepal with pin-points on 2026 Cricket World Cup Qualifier Play-off Venues
Kirtipur	Mulpani
Tribhuvan University; International Cricket Ground	Mulpani International Cricket Ground
Capacity: 13,000	Capacity: 4,000
Matches: 14	Matches: 14
TU Cricket Ground	Mulpani International Cricket Ground

== Squads ==
Canada	Italy	Jersey	Kuwait
Hamza Tariq (c); Toby Albert; Warren Campbell; Samit Gohel; Nicholas Kirton; Akhil Kumar; Ali Nadeem; Sheel Patel; Yuvraaj Samra; Kaleem Sana; Shivam Sharma; Zahid Shirzad; Sukhjinder Singh; Harsh Thaker; Aaditya Varadarajan			
Namibia	Nepal	Uganda	United Arab Emirates

Canada named Ajayveer Hundal, Ansh Patel and Shreyas Movva as reserves.

== Points table ==
Pos	Team	Pld	W	L	NR	Pts	NRR	Qualification
1	Canada	0	0	0	0	0	—	Advance to the 2027 Cricket World Cup Qualifier
2	Italy	0	0	0	0	0	—	Advance to the 2027 Cricket World Cup Qualifier
3	Jersey	0	0	0	0	0	—	Advance to the 2027 Cricket World Cup Qualifier
4	Kuwait	0	0	0	0	0	—	Advance to the 2027 Cricket World Cup Qualifier
5	Namibia	0	0	0	0	0	—	
6	Nepal (H)	0	0	0	0	0	—	
7	Uganda	0	0	0	0	0	—	
8	United Arab Emirates	0	0	0	0	0	—	

First match(es) will be played: 4 December 2026. Source: Cricinfo
(H) Host

== Fixtures ==
The International Cricket Council (ICC) announced the schedule for the tournament on 6 November 2026.

4 December 2026
10:00
Scorecard

Nepal	v	Italy

Tribhuvan University International Cricket Ground, Kirtipur

4 December 2026
10:00
Scorecard

Namibia	v	Uganda

Mulpani International Cricket Ground, Kageshwari-Manohara

5 December 2026
10:00
Scorecard

Jersey	v	United Arab Emirates

Tribhuvan University International Cricket Ground, Kirtipur

5 December 2026
10:00
Scorecard

Kuwait	v	Canada

Mulpani International Cricket Ground, Kageshwari-Manohara

6 December 2026
10:00
Scorecard

Nepal	v	Uganda

Tribhuvan University International Cricket Ground, Kirtipur

6 December 2026
10:00
Scorecard

Italy	v	Namibia

Mulpani International Cricket Ground, Kageshwari-Manohara

7 December 2026
10:00
Scorecard

Jersey	v	Kuwait

Tribhuvan University International Cricket Ground, Kirtipur

7 December 2026
10:00
Scorecard

Canada	v	United Arab Emirates

Mulpani International Cricket Ground, Kageshwari-Manohara

9 December 2026
10:00
Scorecard

Canada	v	Italy

Tribhuvan University International Cricket Ground, Kirtipur

9 December 2026
10:00
Scorecard

Jersey	v	Uganda

Mulpani International Cricket Ground, Kageshwari-Manohara

10 December 2026
10:00
Scorecard

Nepal	v	United Arab Emirates

Tribhuvan University International Cricket Ground, Kirtipur

10 December 2026
10:00
Scorecard

Kuwait	v	Namibia

Mulpani International Cricket Ground, Kageshwari-Manohara

12 December 2026
10:00
Scorecard

Nepal	v	Jersey

Tribhuvan University International Cricket Ground, Kirtipur

12 December 2026
10:00
Scorecard

Canada	v	Namibia

Mulpani International Cricket Ground, Kageshwari-Manohara

13 December 2026
10:00
Scorecard

Kuwait	v	Uganda

Tribhuvan University International Cricket Ground, Kirtipur

13 December 2026
10:00
Scorecard

Italy	v	United Arab Emirates

Mulpani International Cricket Ground, Kageshwari-Manohara

14 December 2026
10:00
Scorecard

Nepal	v	Canada

Tribhuvan University International Cricket Ground, Kirtipur

14 December 2026
10:00
Scorecard

Jersey	v	Namibia

Mulpani International Cricket Ground, Kageshwari-Manohara

15 December 2026
10:00
Scorecard

Italy	v	Uganda

Tribhuvan University International Cricket Ground, Kirtipur

15 December 2026
10:00
Scorecard

United Arab Emirates	v	Kuwait

Mulpani International Cricket Ground, Kageshwari-Manohara

17 December 2026
10:00
Scorecard

Italy	v	Kuwait

Tribhuvan University International Cricket Ground, Kirtipur

17 December 2026
10:00
Scorecard

Canada	v	Jersey

Mulpani International Cricket Ground, Kageshwari-Manohara

18 December 2026
10:00
Scorecard

Nepal	v	Namibia

Tribhuvan University International Cricket Ground, Kirtipur

18 December 2026
10:00
Scorecard

Uganda	v	United Arab Emirates

Mulpani International Cricket Ground, Kageshwari-Manohara

20 December 2026
10:00
Scorecard

Namibia	v	United Arab Emirates

Tribhuvan University International Cricket Ground, Kirtipur

20 December 2026
10:00
Scorecard

Italy	v	Jersey

Mulpani International Cricket Ground, Kageshwari-Manohara

21 December 2026
10:00
Scorecard

Nepal	v	Kuwait

Tribhuvan University International Cricket Ground, Kirtipur

21 December 2026
10:00
Scorecard

Canada	v	Uganda

Mulpani International Cricket Ground, Kageshwari-Manohara

== See also ==
- 2027 Cricket World Cup
- 2027 Cricket World Cup qualification
- 2024–2026 Cricket World Cup League 2
- 2027 Cricket World Cup Qualifier
- 2024–2026 Cricket World Cup Challenge League
- 2024 Cricket World Cup Challenge League Play-off
