= 2024–2026 Cricket World Cup Challenge League =

Qualifying league for 2027 CWC qualification

- Dates: 25 September 2024 – 31 October 2026
- Administrator: International Cricket Council
- Cricket format: List A
- Tournament format: Round-robin
- Hosts: League A: Kenya (2024); Jersey (2025); Kenya (2026); League B: Uganda (2024); Hong Kong (2025); Tanzania (2026)
- Champions: Jersey (League A): Italy (League B)
- Participants: 12
- Matches: 90
- Most runs: (Jersey) Zak Tribe (662) (League A): (Uganda) Raghav Dhawan (558) (League B)
- Most wickets: (Papua New Guinea) Kabua Morea (27) (League A): (Italy) Crishan Kalugamage (29) (League B)

The 2024–2026 ICC Cricket World Cup Challenge League was the second edition of the ICC Cricket World Cup Challenge League and a cricket tournament which formed part of the 2027 Cricket World Cup qualification process.

== Teams and qualification ==
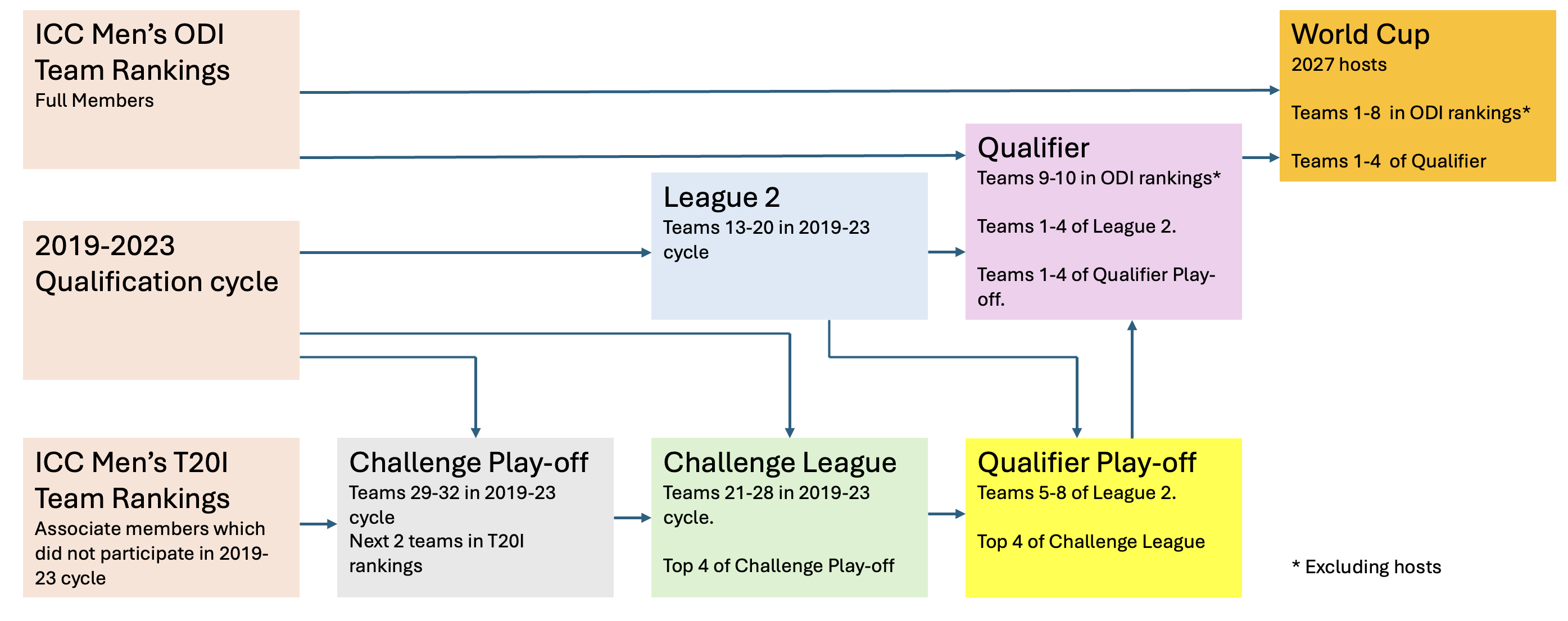
Qualification Pathway for the 2027 Cricket World Cup.

The league features twelve teams: those finishing 2nd–4th in their respective league in the 2019–2022 ICC Cricket World Cup Challenge League, the top four finishers from 2024 ICC Cricket World Cup Challenge League Play-off and two teams from the 2023 Cricket World Cup Qualifier Play-off.

That tournament saw Canada, winner of League A in the previous Challenge League being promoted to League 2 status, while Papua New Guinea was relegated. The other Challenge League winner, Jersey, was not successful in obtaining promotion. The top 2 teams from both groups A and B will secure a spot at the ICC Men's Cricket World Cup Qualifier Playoff.

Method of qualification	Date of qualification	Venues	Number of teams	Teams
2023 Qualifier Play-off	26 March – 5 April 2023	Namibia	2	Jersey
2023 Qualifier Play-off	26 March – 5 April 2023	Namibia	2	Papua New Guinea
2019–2022 Challenge League	16 September 2019 – 13 December 2022	Various	6	Denmark
2019–2022 Challenge League	16 September 2019 – 13 December 2022	Various	6	Hong Kong
2019–2022 Challenge League	16 September 2019 – 13 December 2022	Various	6	Kenya
2019–2022 Challenge League	16 September 2019 – 13 December 2022	Various	6	Qatar
2019–2022 Challenge League	16 September 2019 – 13 December 2022	Various	6	Singapore
2019–2022 Challenge League	16 September 2019 – 13 December 2022	Various	6	Uganda
2024 Challenge League Play-off	22 February – 3 March 2024	Malaysia	4	Bahrain
2024 Challenge League Play-off	22 February – 3 March 2024	Malaysia	4	Italy
2024 Challenge League Play-off	22 February – 3 March 2024	Malaysia	4	Kuwait
2024 Challenge League Play-off	22 February – 3 March 2024	Malaysia	4	Tanzania
Total			12	

== Fixtures ==
Each group is scheduled to play three times in a single round-robin tournament format, once each year from 2024 to 2026. This amounts to 15 matches per team and a total of 90 matches.

League	Date	Location
A	25 September – 5 October 2024	Kenya
B	6–16 November 2024	Uganda
B	6–16 February 2025	Hong Kong
A	21–31 August 2025	Jersey
B	8–18 August 2026	Tanzania
A	21–31 October 2026	Kenya

== Results ==
=== League A ===
Team 1 \ Team 2	(Denmark)	(Jersey)	(Kenya)	(Kuwait)	(Papua New Guinea)	(Qatar)
Denmark	—	0–3 [3]	2–1 [3]	1–2 [3]	1–2 [3]	2–0 [3]
Jersey	—	—	2–1 [3]	1–1 [3]	3–0 [3]	3–0 [3]
Kenya	—	—	—	0–2 [3]	1–1 [3]	1–2 [3]
Kuwait	—	—	—	—	2–1 [3]	2–1 [3]
Papua New Guinea	—	—	—	—	—	1–2 [3]
Qatar	—	—	—	—	—	—

Source: Cricinfo
The numbers in square brackets are the numbers of matches played.
Legend: Blue = left column team win; Yellow = draw; Red = top row team win.

=== League B ===
Team 1 \ Team 2	(Bahrain)	(Hong Kong)	(Italy)	(Singapore)	(Tanzania)	(Uganda)
Bahrain	—	0–3 [3]	0–2 [3]	3–0 [3]	2–1 [3]	1–2 [3]
Hong Kong	—	—	0–3 [3]	3–0 [3]	2–0 [3]	1–1 [3]
Italy	—	—	—	3–0 [3]	3–0 [3]	1–1 [3]
Singapore	—	—	—	—	0–2 [3]	0–3 [3]
Tanzania	—	—	—	—	—	0–3 [3]
Uganda	—	—	—	—	—	—

Source: Cricinfo
The numbers in square brackets are the numbers of matches played.
Legend: Blue = left column team win; Yellow = draw; Red = top row team win.

== Points table ==
=== League A ===
Pos	Team	Pld	W	L	T	NR	Pts	NRR	Qualification
1	Jersey	15	12	2	1	0	25	1.895	Advanced to the 2026 Cricket World Cup Qualifier Play-off
2	Kuwait	15	9	4	1	1	20	0.467	Advanced to the 2026 Cricket World Cup Qualifier Play-off
3	Denmark	15	6	8	0	1	13	−0.269	
4	Papua New Guinea	15	5	8	0	2	12	−1.076	
5	Qatar	15	4	9	0	2	10	−0.680	Relegate to the 2027 Cricket World Cup Challenge League Play-off
6	Kenya	15	4	9	0	2	10	−0.685	Relegate to the 2027 Cricket World Cup Challenge League Play-off

Source: Cricinfo
Rules for classification: 1) Points; 2) Wins; 3) Net run rate; 4) Results of games between tied teams

=== League B ===
Pos	Team	Pld	W	L	NR	Pts	NRR	Qualification
1	Italy	15	12	1	2	26	2.152	Advanced to the 2026 Cricket World Cup Qualifier Play-off
2	Uganda	15	10	3	2	22	1.204	Advanced to the 2026 Cricket World Cup Qualifier Play-off
3	Hong Kong	15	9	4	2	20	0.382	
4	Bahrain	15	6	8	1	13	−0.249	
5	Tanzania	15	3	10	2	8	−1.000	Relegated to the 2027 Cricket World Cup Challenge League Play-off
6	Singapore	15	0	14	1	1	−2.318	Relegated to the 2027 Cricket World Cup Challenge League Play-off

Source: Cricinfo
Rules for classification: 1) Points; 2) Wins; 3) Net run rate; 4) Results of games between tied teams

== Statistics ==
=== League A ===
==== Most runs ====
- Source: Cricinfo
- Last updated: 31 August 2025

Most runs scored by a batter
Runs	Player	Inns.	HS	Ave	SR	100s	50s	4s	6s
442	(Kenya) Rakep Patel	9	91	63.14	82.15	0	5	37	10
435	(Denmark) Saif Ahmad	10	140	43.50	94.56	2	1	25	26
380	(Qatar) Imal Liyanage	10	107*	47.50	80.85	1	3	43	5
373	(Jersey) Zak Tribe	9	100	74.60	108.74	1	2	32	10
373	(Jersey) Josh Lawrenson	9	139	41.44	74.89	1	1	40	2

==== Most wickets ====
- Source: Cricinfo
- Last updated: 31 August 2025

Most wickets taken by a bowler
Wkts.	Player	Inns.	Ov.	BBI	Ave	SR	Eco.	4WI	5WI
23	(Papua New Guinea) Kabua Morea	10	80.4	5/29	16.95	21.04	4.83	1	1
22	(Jersey) Josh Lawrenson	9	67.0	5/29	10.90	18.27	3.58	2	1
19	(Jersey) Nick Greenwood	8	59.3	5/38	12.26	18.78	3.91	0	1
18	(Kuwait) Yasin Patel	9	76.0	5/48	18.11	25.33	4.28	0	1
16	(Papua New Guinea) Alei Nao	9	65.0	4/17	17.62	24.37	4.33	2	0
16	(Denmark) Saif Ahmad	10	78.5	5/38	23.18	29.56	4.70	1	1

=== League B ===
==== Most runs ====
- Source: Cricinfo

Most runs scored by a batter
Runs	Player	Inns.	HS	Ave	SR	100s	50s	4s	6s
558	(Uganda) Raghav Dhawan	13	85	50.72	76.75	0	6	56	10
529	(Hong Kong) Anshuman Rath	14	91	40.69	76.00	0	5	58	5
473	(Uganda) Riazat Ali Shah	12	104	43.00	98.95	1	3	34	20
460	(Italy) Marcus Campopiano	13	74*	46.00	73.13	0	3	43	11
341	(Hong Kong) Babar Hayat	14	103	28.41	66.60	1	1	36	9

==== Most wickets ====
- Source: Cricinfo

Most wickets taken by a bowler
Wkts.	Player	Inns.	Ov.	BBI	Ave	SR	Eco.	4WI	5WI
29	(Italy) Crishan Kalugamage	13	96.5	4/36	13.20	20.00	3.95	1	0
25	(Hong Kong) Yasim Murtaza	13	102.4	4/17	14.60	24.60	3.55	2	0
24	(Uganda) Juma Miyagi	13	90.1	6/17	14.95	22.50	3.98	2	1
23	(Italy) Rakibul Hasan	9	76.2	6/18	9.34	19.90	2.81	0	2
23	(Uganda) Henry Ssenyondo	12	97.5	4/28	13.17	25.50	3.09	2	0
