= Cricket Super League =

Cricket Super League may refer to:

- Pakistan Super League, founded in 2015
- Cricket World Cup Super League, the top level of the Cricket World Cup qualification system
- Women's Cricket Super League (WCSL) in England and Wales
- Women's T20 Super League, that began in 2019 in South Africa
- Mzansi Super League, organized in 2018 in South Africa
