= Pakistani cricket team in England in 2027 =

International cricket tour

	England	Pakistan
- Dates: 15 May – 26 May 2027

One Day International series

The Pakistan cricket team is scheduled to tour England in May 2027 to play the England cricket team. The tour will consist of five ODI matches. In July 2026, the Pakistan Cricket Board (PCB) confirmed the fixtures for the tour, as a part of the preparation for the 2027 Cricket World Cup.

== ODI series ==
=== 1st ODI ===
15 May 2027
11:00
Scorecard

England	v	Pakistan

Rose Bowl, Southampton

=== 2nd ODI ===
19 May 2027
13:00 (D/N)
Scorecard

England	v	Pakistan

Old Trafford, Manchester

=== 3rd ODI ===
21 May 2027
13:00 (D/N)
Scorecard

England	v	Pakistan

Headingley, Leeds

=== 4th ODI ===
23 May 2027
11:00
Scorecard

England	v	Pakistan

Riverside Ground, Chester-le-Street

=== 5th ODI ===
26 May 2027
13:00 (D/N)
Scorecard

England	v	Pakistan

Sophia Gardens, Cardiff
