= Tim Cutler =

Australian-born Vanuatu cricketer (born 1982)

Personal information
- Full name: Timothy Lawrence Cutler
- Born: 23 March 1982 (age 44); Caringbah, New South Wales, Australia
- Batting: Right-handed
- Bowling: Slow left-arm orthodox

International information
- National side: Vanuatu (2024-present)
- T20I debut (cap 26): 5 March 2024 v Tanzania
- Last T20I: 11 March 2024 v Kuwait

Domestic team information
- Years: Team
- 2014–present: Hong Kong Cricket Club
- Source: ESPNcricinfo, 14 May 2016

Timothy Lawrence Cutler (born 23 March 1982) is an Australian cricket administrator and cricketer who plays international cricket for the Vanuatu national team. He is a right-handed batter as well as slow left-arm orthodox bowler who had played cricket before for the Hong Kong Cricket Club in the Hong Kong domestic cricket competitions. He is the founder of Emerging Cricket, which he established in late 2018.

== Career ==
Cutler initially pursued his career in marine insurance straightaway after finishing his high school education. He moved to Hong Kong in 2013 after spending a brief period of time in marine insurance in Brisbane.

Cutler was named as the first CEO of Hong Kong Cricket Association in 2014 but it took a long process before being appointed to the position in May 2015, tasked with making Hong Kong cricket a shining light among the associates and building bridges with the government as well as the International Cricket Council. He served as CEO of Hong Kong Cricket Association from 2015 to 2017 and during his tenure Hong Kong T20 Blitz was launched. He resigned from the position of Hong Cricket CEO in April 2017.

In late 2018, Cutler formed a WhatsApp group chat with Daniel Beswick and Nick Skinner regarding to develop the sport of cricket to other parts of the world and launched the Emerging Cricket platform.

In March 2021, he was appointed as the CEO of Vanuatu Cricket Association replacing Shane Deitz and he was expected to commence his term as CEO from mid-April 2021.

In February 2024, Cutler was named in Vanuatu's squad for the 2024 ICC Cricket World Cup Challenge League Play-off in Malaysia. He made his List A debut on 22 February 2024, against Bahrain. He made his Twenty20 International (T20I) debut against Tanzania on 5 March 2024, during the 2024 Malaysia Open T20 Championship.
