= 2023 Cricket World Cup Qualifier Play-off =

International cricket tournament

2023 ICC Men's Cricket World Cup Qualifier Play-off
- Dates: 26 March – 5 April 2023
- Administrator: International Cricket Council
- Cricket format: One Day International
- Tournament format: Round-robin
- Host: Namibia
- Champions: United States
- Participants: 6
- Matches: 15
- Player of the series: (Namibia) Gerhard Erasmus
- Most runs: (United Arab Emirates) Asif Khan (296)
- Most wickets: (United States) Ali Khan (16)

The 2023 Cricket World Cup Qualifier Play-off was the inaugural edition of the Cricket World Cup Qualifier Play-off, a cricket tournament which formed part of the 2023 Cricket World Cup qualification process. It took place in March and April 2023, with all matches having One Day International (ODI) status, regardless of whether or not a team had ODI status prior to the start of the event. As a result, Jersey played their first ever matches with ODI status.

Six teams qualified for the tournament: the bottom four teams from the 2019–2023 ICC Cricket World Cup League 2 along with the top teams in Groups A and B of the 2019–2022 ICC Cricket World Cup Challenge League. The top two teams from this tournament progressed to the 2023 Cricket World Cup Qualifier for a chance to participate in the 2023 Cricket World Cup. The other teams had no remaining means of qualifying.

In an event within the event, the bottom two League 2 teams (Papua New Guinea and the United Arab Emirates), and each of the Challenge League winners (Canada and Jersey), competed for two places in League 2 and therefore ODI status for the next cycle. As a result, Canada was promoted to League 2 and Papua New Guinea was relegated to The Challenge League.

The International Cricket Council announced the schedule for the tournament on 20 March 2023.

== Teams and qualification ==
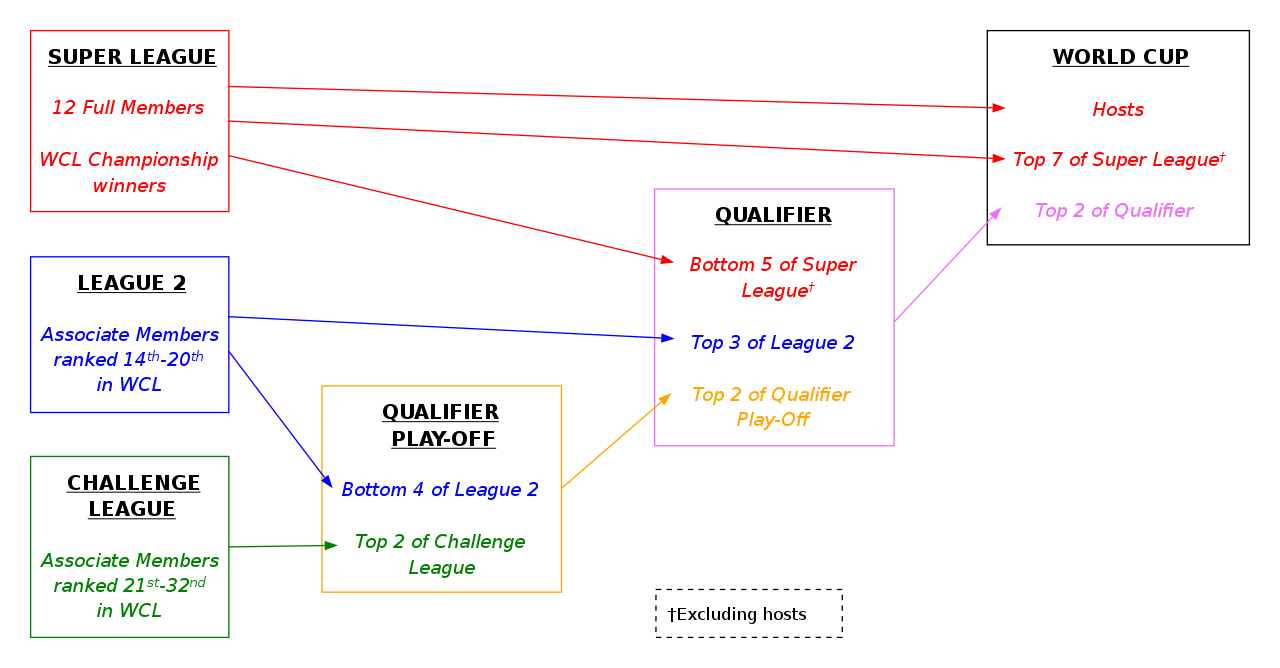
A diagram that explains the qualification structure for the 2023 Cricket World Cup.

Means of qualification	Date	Venue	Berths	Qualified
League 2 (bottom 4)	August 2019 – March 2023	Various	4	Namibia; Papua New Guinea; United Arab Emirates; United States
Challenge League (top of each group)	September 2019 – December 2022	Various	2	Canada; Jersey
Total			6	

== Squads ==
The following squads were named for the tournament.

Canada	Jersey	Namibia	Papua New Guinea	United Arab Emirates	United States
Saad Bin Zafar (c); Nikhil Dutta; Jeremy Gordon; Dillon Heyliger; Aaron Johnson; Ammar Khalid; Nicholas Kirton; Parveen Kumar; Shreyas Movva (wk); Kaleem Sana; Pargat Singh; Ravinderpal Singh; Matthew Spoors; Harsh Thaker; Srimantha Wijeratne (wk)	Charles Perchard (c); Daniel Birrell; Dominic Blampied; Harrison Carlyon; Jake Dunford (wk); Nick Greenwood; Anthony Hawkins-Kay; Jonty Jenner; Josh Lawrenson; Elliot Miles; Ben Stevens; Julius Sumerauer; Asa Tribe; Benjamin Ward	Gerhard Erasmus (c); Karl Birkenstock; Niko Davin; Michau du Preez; Shaun Fouché; Zane Green (wk); Joshuan Julius; Jan Nicol Loftie-Eaton; Mauritius Ngupita; Bernard Scholtz; Ben Shikongo; Ruben Trumpelmann; Michael van Lingen; Pikky Ya France	Assad Vala (c); Charles Amini (vc); Sese Bau; Kiplin Doriga (wk); Riley Hekure; Hiri Hiri; Semo Kamea; John Kariko; Kabua Morea; Alei Nao; Chad Soper; Gaudi Toka; Tony Ura; Norman Vanua; Hila Vare (wk)	Muhammad Waseem (c); Vriitya Aravind; Aayan Afzal Khan; Asif Khan; Matiullah Khan; Zahoor Khan; Aryan Lakra; Karthik Meiyappan; Rohan Mustafa; Rameez Shahzad; Aryansh Sharma; Sanchit Sharma; Junaid Siddique; Ansh Tandon	Monank Patel (c, wk); Aaron Jones (vc); Shayan Jahangir (wk); Nosthush Kenjige; Ali Khan; Sushant Modani; Saiteja Mukkamalla; Saurabh Netravalkar; Nisarg Patel; Kyle Philip; Usman Rafiq; Gajanand Singh; Jessy Singh; Steven Taylor

- On 9 February 2023, Canada named a provisional 16-man squad for a warm-up tour of Sri Lanka, with the squad cut after traveling to Namibia.
- On 16 March 2023, United States wicket-keeper Saideep Ganesh was ruled out of the tournament due to an injury sustained during training camp in Bengaluru, with Saiteja Mukkamalla named as his replacement.

== Points table ==
Pos	Team	Pld	W	L	NR	Pts	NRR	Qualification
1	United States	5	4	1	0	8	0.810	Advanced to the 2023 Cricket World Cup Qualifier and 2024–2026 Cricket World Cup League 2
2	United Arab Emirates	5	4	1	0	8	0.458	Advanced to the 2023 Cricket World Cup Qualifier and 2024–2026 Cricket World Cup League 2
3	Namibia	5	3	2	0	6	0.601	Advanced to the 2024–2026 Cricket World Cup League 2
4	Canada	5	3	2	0	6	0.123	Advanced to the 2024–2026 Cricket World Cup League 2
5	Jersey	5	1	4	0	2	−0.840	Relegated to the 2024–2026 Cricket World Cup Challenge League
6	Papua New Guinea	5	0	5	0	0	−1.148	Relegated to the 2024–2026 Cricket World Cup Challenge League

Source: ESPNcricinfo

== Fixtures ==
26 March 2023
09:30
Scorecard

United States; 231/9 (50 overs)	v	Namibia; 151 (41.4 overs)
Gajanand Singh 53 (63); Shaun Fouché 3/46 (10 overs)		Shaun Fouché 55 (98); Ali Khan 3/21 (7 overs)

United States won by 80 runs
Wanderers Cricket Ground, Windhoek
Umpires: David Odhiambo (Ken) and Christopher Phiri (Zim)
Player of the match: Gajanand Singh (USA)

- Namibia won the toss and elected to field.
- Niko Davin (Nam) made his ODI debut.

27 March 2023
09:30
Scorecard

United Arab Emirates; 260/7 (50 overs)	v	Papua New Guinea; 239 (48.3 overs)
Muhammad Waseem 96 (106); Chad Soper 4/43 (10 overs)		Kiplin Doriga 73 (71); Karthik Meiyappan 4/45 (8 overs)

United Arab Emirates won by 21 runs
Wanderers Cricket Ground, Windhoek
Umpires: Andrew Louw (Nam) and Patric Makumbi (Uga)
Player of the match: Aayan Afzal Khan (UAE)

- Papua New Guinea won the toss and elected to field.
- Sanchit Sharma (UAE) made his ODI debut.

27 March 2023
09:30
Scorecard

Canada; 238/8 (50 overs)	v	Jersey; 207 (47.5 overs)
Srimantha Wijeratne 63 (91); Charles Perchard 3/38 (10 overs)		Josh Lawrenson 66 (101); Jeremy Gordon 3/30 (8.5 overs)

Canada won by 31 runs
United Ground, Windhoek
Umpires: David Odhiambo (Ken) and Isaac Oyieko (Ken)
Player of the match: Nikhil Dutta (Can)

- Jersey won the toss and elected to field.
- This was Jersey's first match with ODI status.
- Aaron Johnson, Nicholas Kirton, Saad Bin Zafar, Kaleem Sana, Pargat Singh, Ravinderpal Singh, Matthew Spoors, Harsh Thaker, Srimantha Wijeratne (Can), Harrison Carlyon, Jake Dunford, Nick Greenwood, Anthony Hawkins-Kay, Jonty Jenner, Josh Lawrenson, Elliot Miles, Charles Perchard, Julius Sumerauer, Asa Tribe and Benjamin Ward (Jer) all made their ODI debuts.

29 March 2023
09:30
Scorecard

Canada; 198 (49.4 overs)	v	United States; 172 (47.3 overs)
Aaron Johnson 47 (52); Saurabh Netravalkar 2/24 (10 overs)		Sushant Modani 64 (126); Kaleem Sana 3/14 (9 overs)

Canada won by 26 runs
Wanderers Cricket Ground, Windhoek
Umpires: David Odhiambo (Ken) and Claus Schumacher (Nam)
Player of the match: Harsh Thaker (Can)

- United States won the toss and elected to field.

29 March 2023
09:30
Scorecard

Namibia; 381/8 (50 overs)	v	Papua New Guinea; 333 (46.2 overs)
Gerhard Erasmus 125 (113); Semo Kamea 5/68 (10 overs)		Charles Amini 109 (75); Ruben Trumpelmann 3/63 (8.2 overs)

Namibia won by 48 runs
United Ground, Windhoek
Umpires: Patric Makumbi (Uga) and Isaac Oyieko (Ken)
Player of the match: Gerhard Erasmus (Nam)

- Papua New Guinea won the toss and elected to field.
- Namibia's total of 381 was the highest by an associate nation in an ODI.
- Charles Amini (PNG) scored his first century in ODIs.
- Papua New Guinea's total of 333 was their highest in ODIs.
- The 714 runs scored in the match was the highest match aggregate in ODIs involving associate nations.

30 March 2023
09:30
Scorecard

Jersey; 213/9 (50 overs)	v	Namibia; 216/2 (32.1 overs)
Jonty Jenner 76 (96); Ruben Trumpelmann 3/24 (10 overs)		Michael van Lingen 110* (93); Charles Perchard 1/34 (5 overs)

Namibia won by 8 wickets
Wanderers Cricket Ground, Windhoek
Umpires: Patric Makumbi (Uga) and Isaac Oyieko (Ken)
Player of the match: Michael van Lingen (Nam)

- Jersey won the toss and elected to bat.
- Dominic Blampied (Jer) made his ODI debut.

30 March 2023
09:30
Scorecard

United Arab Emirates; 279/9 (50 overs)	v	United States; 281/5 (49 overs)
Asif Khan 103 (84); Nisarg Patel 2/35 (10 overs)		Saiteja Mukkamalla 120* (114); Junaid Siddique 3/49 (10 overs)

United States won by 5 wickets
United Ground, Windhoek
Umpires: Andrew Louw (Nam) and Claus Schumacher (Nam)
Player of the match: Saiteja Mukkamalla (USA)

- United Arab Emirates won the toss and elected to bat.
- Matiullah Khan (UAE) made his ODI debut.
- Saiteja Mukkamalla (USA) scored his first century in ODIs.

1 April 2023
09:30
Scorecard

Canada; 254 (48.5 overs)	v	United Arab Emirates; 255/4 (49 overs)
Pargat Singh 102 (96); Aayan Afzal Khan 3/34 (7 overs)		Muhammad Waseem 80 (78); Nikhil Dutta 1/33 (10 overs)

United Arab Emirates won by 6 wickets
Wanderers Cricket Ground, Windhoek
Umpires: David Odhiambo (Ken) and Christopher Phiri (Zim)
Player of the match: Muhammad Waseem (UAE)

- Canada won the toss and elected to bat.
- Pargat Singh (Can) scored his first century in ODIs.

1 April 2023
09:30
Scorecard

Jersey; 291/4 (50 overs)	v	Papua New Guinea; 280/9 (50 overs)
Asa Tribe 115* (143); Chad Soper 2/40 (9 overs)		Assad Vala 75 (107); Elliot Miles 2/35 (8 overs)

Jersey won by 11 runs
United Ground, Windhoek
Umpires: Andrew Louw (Nam) and Patric Makumbi (Uga)
Player of the match: Josh Lawrenson (Jer)

- Jersey won the toss and elected to bat.
- Josh Lawrenson and then Asa Tribe became the first players for Jersey to score a century in ODIs.
- The partnership of 232 runs between Lawrenson and Tribe was the highest ever for any wicket for an associate nation in ODIs.
- This was Jersey's first win in an ODI.

2 April 2023
09:30
Scorecard

United States; 235/7 (50 overs)	v	Papua New Guinea; 118 (34.5 overs)
Steven Taylor 81 (133); Semo Kamea 3/32 (10 overs)		Assad Vala 42 (72); Gajanand Singh 4/15 (6.5 overs)

United States won by 117 runs
Wanderers Cricket Ground, Windhoek
Umpires: Patric Makumbi (Uga) and Claus Schumacher (Nam)
Player of the match: Steven Taylor (USA)

- United States won the toss and elected to bat.
- This result confirmed that Papua New Guinea would be relegated to the 2023–2026 ICC Cricket World Cup Challenge League.

2 April 2023
09:30
Scorecard

United Arab Emirates; 267/5 (50 overs)	v	Namibia; 239 (48.4 overs)
Asif Khan 96 (86); Gerhard Erasmus 1/13 (2 overs)		Shaun Fouché 47 (60); Rohan Mustafa 3/34 (9 overs)

United Arab Emirates won by 28 runs
United Ground, Windhoek
Umpires: David Odhiambo (Ken) and Christopher Phiri (Zim)
Player of the match: Asif Khan (UAE)

- Namibia won the toss and elected to field.

4 April 2023
09:30
Scorecard

Namibia; 267/9 (50 overs)	v	Canada; 156 (42.2 overs)
Shaun Fouché 83 (107); Harsh Thaker 2/27 (10 overs)		Ravinderpal Singh 34 (44); Gerhard Erasmus 2/24 (8.2 overs)

Namibia won by 111 runs
Wanderers Cricket Ground, Windhoek
Umpires: Isaac Oyieko (Ken) and Christopher Phiri (Zim)
Player of the match: Shaun Fouché (Nam)

- Namibia won the toss and elected to bat.
- Dillon Heyliger (Can) made his ODI debut.

4 April 2023
09:30
Scorecard

United States; 231 (50 overs)	v	Jersey; 206 (47.4 overs)
Steven Taylor 79 (100); Benjamin Ward 4/39 (10 overs)		Asa Tribe 75 (104); Ali Khan 7/32 (9.4 overs)

United States won by 25 runs
United Ground, Windhoek
Umpires: Andrew Louw (Nam) and Claus Schumacher (Nam)
Player of the match: Ali Khan (USA)

- Jersey won the toss and elected to field.
- This result confirmed that Jersey would be relegated to the 2023–2026 ICC Cricket World Cup Challenge League.

5 April 2023
09:30
Scorecard

United Arab Emirates; 284/7 (50 overs)	v	Jersey; 218 (44.5 overs)
Asif Khan 82 (86); Julius Sumerauer 4/51 (10 overs)		Harrison Carlyon 85 (89); Karthik Meiyappan 4/57 (10 overs)

United Arab Emirates won by 66 runs
Wanderers Cricket Ground, Windhoek
Umpires: Christopher Phiri (Zim) and Claus Schumacher (Nam)
Player of the match: Asif Khan (UAE)

- United Arab Emirates won the toss and elected to bat.
- Daniel Birrell, Ben Stevens (Jer), Aryansh Sharma and Ansh Tandon (UAE) all made their ODI debuts.

5 April 2023
09:30
Scorecard

Canada; 218/8 (50 overs)	v	Papua New Guinea; 128 (37 overs)
Pargat Singh 66 (104); John Kariko 4/45 (10 overs)		Tony Ura 36 (38); Jeremy Gordon 6/43 (10 overs)

Canada won by 90 runs
United Ground, Windhoek
Umpires: Andrew Louw (Nam) and Isaac Oyieko (Ken)
Player of the match: Jeremy Gordon (Can)

- Canada won the toss and elected to bat.
- Jeremy Gordon (Can) took his first five-wicket haul in ODIs.
