= Cricket World Cup Super League =

Defunct International ODI format league

ICC Men's Cricket World Cup Super League
- Sport: Cricket
- Founded: 2019
- First season: 2020–2023 ICC Cricket World Cup Super League
- Replaced by: ICC Men's ODI Team Rankings
- Administrator: International Cricket Council
- No. of teams: 13

The ICC Men's Cricket World Cup Super League was an international cricket competition contested in the One Day International (ODI) Cricket format and the top level of the three-league Cricket World Cup qualification system which was introduced in 2019. 13 teams participated in the league, of which the top 8 teams directly qualify for the next Cricket World Cup and the bottom 5 teams advance to the World Cup Qualifier for another chance to qualify. The Super League replaced the ODI rankings as the route to direct qualification for the 2023 Cricket World Cup. The only edition of the ODI Super League was between 2020–2023.

== Background ==
The Super League was introduced after the 2019 Cricket World Cup and introduced improvements to the World Cup qualification process. The previous use of ODI rankings involved intricate calculations and was unbalanced. It was open to manipulation with no obligation for top teams to play against lesser teams, who were left with no chance to improve their positions. In comparison, the Super League has a simple points table and the same number of matches for each team.

Facing better competition provided lesser teams with the prospect of better attendance, financial gain and increased popularity of cricket in their countries. The Netherlands were scheduled to host England in May 2021 but the series was pushed back a year as the ongoing COVID-19 pandemic could have restricted attendance and made the series financially unviable. After having been scrapped for the 2027 Cricket World Cup qualification cycle, the Super League was raised at the 2025 ICC Annual General Meeting in discussions regarding its potential reintroduction for the 2031 qualification cycle; it gained no traction.

== Competition ==
The Super League formed part of the qualification process for the 2023 Cricket World Cup. This was the only time that this format has been used and it will not be used for 2027. 13 teams each played 24 matches and were ranked by their results. The fixtures were agreed by consensus between the teams. The top ranked teams directly qualified for the World Cup while the remaining teams advanced to the 2023 Cricket World Cup Qualifier.

== See also ==
- ICC World Test Championship
- ICC Cricket World Cup League 2
- ICC Cricket World Cup Challenge League
