= Cricket World Cup Challenge League =

International cricket tournament

ICC Men's Cricket World Cup Challenge League
- Sport: Cricket
- Founded: 2019
- First season: 2019–2022
- Administrator: International Cricket Council
- No. of teams: 12
- Promotion to: ICC Cricket World Cup League 2
- Relegation to: Challenge League Play-off (out of qualification system)
- Website: Official website
- 2024–2026

The ICC Men's Cricket World Cup Challenge League is a cricket competition contested in the List A format, and the bottom level of the three-league Cricket World Cup qualification system, which was introduced in 2019. Twelve teams participate in two groups, where the top team of each group advances to the World Cup Qualifier Play-off, which is a pathway to qualification for the next Cricket World Cup. The Challenge League replaced Divisions Three, Four and Five from the World Cricket League in determining World Cup qualification. The first edition was in 2019–2022.

== Competition format ==
=== Competition ===
The Cricket World Cup is held once every four years and the Challenge League forms part of the qualification process for each edition. Twelve teams are divided into two groups of six and each group plays a triple round robin. The top ranked team of each group advances to the World Cup Qualifier Play-off. For a Challenge League team to qualify for the World Cup, they must, in succession, top their Challenge League group, achieve a top-two finish in the World Cup Qualifier Play-off and achieve a top-two finish in the World Cup Qualifier.

=== Promotion and relegation ===
A system of promotion and relegation exists between the Challenge League and Cricket World Cup League 2. In the World Cup Qualifier Play-off, the bottom two teams from League 2 and the two champions of the Challenge League could change leagues depending on their results. Of the four teams, the two teams ranked higher will play in the next League 2, while the two teams ranked lower will play in the next Challenge League.

The bottom four teams from the Challenge League are also at risk of dropping out of the 32-team qualification system entirely. They play in the World Cup Challenge Play-off with four other teams from outside the system. Of the eight participants, only the top four teams will play in the next Challenge League.

== Editions ==
Edition	No. of teams	Winners	Promoted to League 2	Relegated from system	Relegated from League 2	Promoted to system
2019–2022	12	League A: Canada League B: Jersey	Canada	Bermuda; Italy; Malaysia; Vanuatu		
2023–2026	12	League A: Jersey League B: Italy		Kenya; Qatar; Singapore; Tanzania	Papua New Guinea	Bahrain; Italy; Kuwait; Tanzania

== Teams' performances ==
Legend

- Teams that qualified for the next stage of qualification are underlined.
- ▲ Promoted to League 2
- Remained in Challenge League
- ▼ Relegated from the qualification system
- Relegated to Challenge League from League 2
- Promoted from outside the qualification system

Team	2019–22		2024–26		Apps.
Team	A	B	A	B	Apps.
Bahrain	—N/a			4th	1
Bermuda		6th ▼	—N/a		1
Canada	1st ▲		—N/a		1
Denmark	2nd		3rd		2
Hong Kong		3rd		3rd	2
Italy		5th ▼		1st	2
Jersey		1st	1st		2
Kenya		4th	6th ▼		2
Kuwait	—N/a		2nd		1
Malaysia	5th ▼		—N/a		1
Papua New Guinea	—N/a		4th		1
Qatar	3rd		5th ▼		1
Singapore	4th			6th ▼	2
Tanzania	—N/a			5th ▼	1
Uganda		2nd		2nd	2
Vanuatu	6th ▼		—N/a		1

== See also ==
- Cricket World Cup Super League
- Cricket World Cup League 2
