= 2019–2022 Cricket World Cup Challenge League =

International cricket tournament

2019–2022 ICC Cricket World Cup Challenge League
- Dates: 16 September 2019 – 13 December 2022
- Administrator: International Cricket Council
- Cricket format: List A
- Tournament format: Round-robin
- Hosts: League A: Malaysia (2019); Canada (2022); Malaysia (2022); League B: Oman (2019); Uganda (2022); Jersey (2022)
- Champions: Canada (League A); Jersey (League B)
- Participants: 12
- Matches: 90
- Most runs: (Denmark) Hamid Shah (605) (League A) (Jersey) Nick Greenwood (809) (League B)
- Most wickets: (Singapore) Aryaman Sunil (27) (League A) (Italy) Gareth Berg (34) (League B)

The 2019–2022 ICC Cricket World Cup Challenge League was the inaugural edition of the ICC Cricket World Cup Challenge League and a cricket tournament which formed part of the 2023 Cricket World Cup Qualification process. The Challenge League replaced the World Cricket League (WCL) which was previously used as the pathway to the Cricket World Cup. The first fixtures took place in September 2019, with all matches having List A status.

The league featured the twelve teams ranked from 21st to 32nd place in the WCL following the conclusion of the 2019 ICC World Cricket League Division Two tournament in Namibia. The twelve teams were split into two groups, with each group playing a six-team tournament three times on an annual basis.

The top team in each group advanced to the Qualifier Play-off, which fed into the 2023 Cricket World Cup Qualifier tournament. The remaining ten teams could not qualify for the 2023 World Cup.

In addition, either of the top teams in the Challenge League could qualify for promotion to the next edition of the Cricket World Cup League 2 by outperforming the two last-placed teams in the 2019–22 ICC Cricket World Cup League 2. Whichever two of these four teams were ranked higher in the Qualifier Play-off played in the next League 2 while the two teams ranked lower played in the next Challenge League.

In an attempt to remain in the Challenge League for the next edition, the bottom four teams in this League (two from each section, A and B) would play in a relegation play-off tournament - facing teams hoping to come up from below.

== Participants ==
The following teams were ranked from 21st to 32nd in the World Cricket League following the conclusion of the 2019 ICC World Cricket League Division Two tournament, and were allocated to Groups A and B.

League	Team	WCL rank	Last WCL tournament	Position
A	Canada	21	Division Two in 2019	5th
A	Singapore	23	Division Three in 2018	3rd
A	Denmark	25	Division Three in 2018	5th
A	Malaysia	27	Division Four in 2018	3rd
A	Vanuatu	29	Division Four in 2018	5th
A	Qatar	31	Division Five in 2017	3rd
B	Hong Kong	22	Division Two in 2019	6th
B	Kenya	24	Division Three in 2018	4th
B	Uganda	26	Division Three in 2018	6th
B	Jersey	28	Division Four in 2018	4th
B	Bermuda	30	Division Four in 2018	6th
B	Italy	32	Division Five in 2017	4th

== Fixtures ==
Each group was scheduled to play three times in a single round-robin tournament format, once each year from 2019 to 2022. This amounts to 15 matches per team and a grand total of 90 matches. In July 2019, the International Cricket Council (ICC) announced that the Malaysian Cricket Association and Cricket Hong Kong would host the 2019 rounds of the tournament. However, citing the instability in Hong Kong, the 2019 matches in League B were moved to Oman. In October 2019, the ICC confirmed that Malaysia would again be the host for the 2020 round of matches in League A, with the Uganda Cricket Association hosting the League B matches.

The 2020 League A tournament in Malaysia was originally scheduled to take place in March 2020. However, in March 2020, the tournament was postponed due to the COVID-19 pandemic and rescheduled for 30 September to 10 October 2020. On 10 June 2020, the 2020 League B tournament in Uganda was also postponed due to the pandemic. On 25 August 2020, the rescheduled 2020 League A tournament was postponed again. In December 2020, the ICC announced a revised schedule following the disruption caused by the COVID-19 pandemic. In April 2021, the League A tournament in Canada was postponed by one year, with the League A tournament in Malaysia tentatively brought forward to the end of 2021. In July 2021, the League B tournament scheduled to take place in Jersey in September 2021, was tentatively rescheduled to take place in Hong Kong in December 2021.

League	Date	Location	Notes
A	16–26 September 2019	Malaysia	
B	2–12 December 2019	Oman	
B	17–27 June 2022	Uganda	Originally scheduled for August 2020; postponed due to the COVID-19 pandemic
A	27 July – 6 August 2022	Canada	Originally scheduled for July 2021; postponed due to the COVID-19 pandemic
B	4–14 August 2022	Jersey	Originally scheduled for September 2021; postponed due to the COVID-19 pandemic
A	3–13 December 2022	Malaysia	Originally scheduled for October 2020; postponed due to the COVID-19 pandemic

== Points tables ==
=== League A ===
Pos	Team	Pld	W	L	T	NR	Pts	NRR	Qualification
1	Canada	15	13	1	0	1	27	2.563	Advanced to the 2023 Cricket World Cup Qualifier Play-off
2	Denmark	15	8	6	0	1	17	0.573	
3	Qatar	15	8	6	0	1	17	−0.369	
4	Singapore	15	7	8	0	0	14	−0.061	
5	Malaysia	15	4	11	0	0	8	−1.058	Advanced to the 2024 ICC Cricket World Cup Challenge League Play-off
6	Vanuatu	15	3	11	0	1	7	−1.365	Advanced to the 2024 ICC Cricket World Cup Challenge League Play-off

Source: ESPN Cricinfo

=== League B ===
Pos	Team	Pld	W	L	T	NR	Pts	NRR	Qualification
1	Jersey	15	11	4	0	0	22	1.541	Advanced to the 2023 Cricket World Cup Qualifier Play-off
2	Uganda	15	11	4	0	0	22	1.062	
3	Hong Kong	15	9	5	0	1	19	0.548	
4	Kenya	15	7	7	0	1	15	0.188	
5	Italy	15	5	9	0	1	11	−0.626	Advanced to the 2024 ICC Cricket World Cup Challenge League Play-off
6	Bermuda	15	0	14	0	1	1	−3.192	Advanced to the 2024 ICC Cricket World Cup Challenge League Play-off

Source: ESPN Cricinfo

== Statistics ==
=== League A ===
==== Most runs ====
Player	Matches	Innings	Runs	Average	SR	HS	100	50	4s	6s
(Denmark) Hamid Shah	14	14	605	43.21	70.76	138	1	5	52	10
(Canada) Navneet Dhaliwal	8	8	479	79.83	91.76	140	1	3	52	16
(Qatar) Mohammed Rizlan	14	14	418	32.15	59.54	77	0	3	40	6
(Denmark) Zameer Khan	13	13	404	31.07	57.79	60	0	1	28	0
(Malaysia) Virandeep Singh	13	13	394	32.83	56.28	73	0	3	32	3
Source: ESPNcricinfo

==== Most wickets ====
Player	Matches	Innings	Wickets	Overs	Econ.	Ave.	BBI	S/R	4WI	5WI
(Singapore) Aryaman Sunil	15	15	27	109.5	5.91	24.07	6/32	24.4	2	1
(Denmark) Nicolaj Laegsgaard	14	14	26	116.0	3.28	14.65	6/6	26.7	1	1
(Canada) Saad Bin Zafar	14	14	25	110.5	2.94	13.04	5/18	26.6	0	2
(Qatar) Mohammed Nadeem	14	14	24	123.0	3.87	19.87	5/18	30.7	0	1
(Singapore) Vinoth Baskaran	14	14	20	122.4	3.62	22.15	3/26	36.8	0	0
Source: ESPNcricinfo

=== League B ===
==== Most runs ====
Player	Matches	Innings	Runs	Average	SR	HS	100	50	4s	6s
(Jersey) Nick Greenwood	15	15	809	53.93	96.53	141	3	5	93	12
(Uganda) Ronak Patel	15	14	640	58.18	75.73	121*	1	6	76	2
(Hong Kong) Kinchit Shah	15	15	615	51.25	84.24	139	3	3	64	11
(Kenya) Rakep Patel	15	14	600	46.15	94.63	113	2	3	57	23
(Jersey) Harrison Carlyon	14	14	547	42.07	80.91	96	0	4	80	3
Source: ESPNcricinfo

==== Most wickets ====
Player	Matches	Innings	Wickets	Overs	Econ.	Ave.	BBI	S/R	4WI	5WI
(Italy) Gareth Berg	15	15	34	128.4	3.66	13.85	5/51	22.7	2	1
(Jersey) Julius Sumerauer	15	15	26	107.4	4.57	18.96	6/32	24.8	0	1
(Hong Kong) Ehsan Khan	14	13	22	114.1	3.88	20.18	4/17	31.1	2	0
(Uganda) Dinesh Nakrani	15	15	21	117.2	4.47	25.00	3/20	33.5	0	0
(Kenya) Shem Ngoche	13	13	20	113.5	3.71	21.15	3/24	34.1	0	0
Source: ESPNcricinfo

== See also ==
- 2021–2023 ICC World Test Championship
- 2019–2023 Cricket World Cup League 2
- 2023 Cricket World Cup Qualifier Play-off
