= 2024 Cricket World Cup Challenge League Play-off =

International cricket tournament

2024 ICC Cricket World Cup Challenge League Play-off
- Dates: 22 February – 3 March 2024
- Administrator: International Cricket Council
- Cricket format: List A
- Tournament format: Round-robin
- Host: Malaysia
- Champions: Kuwait (1st title)
- Runners-up: Italy
- Participants: 8
- Matches: 21
- Player of the series: (Bahrain) Haider Butt
- Most runs: (Bahrain) Haider Butt (340)
- Most wickets: (Bahrain) Rizwan Butt (15)

The 2024 ICC Cricket World Cup Challenge League Play-off was a cricket tournament that took place in Malaysia from February to March 2024, to decide the final four places in the next CWC Challenge League for the next World Cup cycle.

Kuwait and Tanzania were the first teams to secure a place in the Challenge League. Bahrain also claimed a place, followed by Italy. Kuwait emerged as winners at the end of the tournament.

== Format ==
The eight qualified teams were placed into two groups of four, with the top three teams from each group advancing to the Super Six stage. The best four sides emerging from the Challenge League Play-off competition qualified for the twelve-team World Cup Challenge League field for the next cycle.

== Qualification ==
In the Challenge League Play-off, the bottom two teams from each of the two groups in the 2019–2022 Challenge League joined four others from outside the 32-team qualification process. These were the four nations with the highest Twenty20 International ranking meeting the following entry requirements:

1. They must've had a minimum of eight domestic teams playing regular cricket, including at least five 40+-over matches in each of the two previous years;
2. They had to be in the top 40 of the ICC T20I Rankings as of 30 September 2023.

Bahrain, Kuwait, Saudi Arabia and Tanzania qualified for the tournament after meeting the requirements.

| Method of qualification | Date of qualification | Venues | Number of teams | Teams |
|---|---|---|---|---|
| 2019–2022 Challenge League (Bottom 4) | 16 September 2019 – 13 December 2022 | Various | 4 | Bermuda |
| 2019–2022 Challenge League (Bottom 4) | 16 September 2019 – 13 December 2022 | Various | 4 | Italy |
| 2019–2022 Challenge League (Bottom 4) | 16 September 2019 – 13 December 2022 | Various | 4 | Malaysia |
| 2019–2022 Challenge League (Bottom 4) | 16 September 2019 – 13 December 2022 | Various | 4 | Vanuatu |
| ICC T20I Rankings (Top 4 meeting requirements) | 30 September 2023 | —N/a | 4 | Bahrain |
| ICC T20I Rankings (Top 4 meeting requirements) | 30 September 2023 | —N/a | 4 | Kuwait |
| ICC T20I Rankings (Top 4 meeting requirements) | 30 September 2023 | —N/a | 4 | Saudi Arabia |
| ICC T20I Rankings (Top 4 meeting requirements) | 30 September 2023 | —N/a | 4 | Tanzania |
| Total | | | 8 | |

== Squads ==
| Bahrain | Bermuda | Italy | Kuwait |
|---|---|---|---|
| Sohail Ahmed (c); Haider Butt; Imran Anwar; Junaid Aziz; Shahbaz Badar (wk); Ahmer Bin Nisar (wk); Rizwan Butt; Ali Dawood; Sachin Kumar; Prashant Kurup; Abdul Majid Abbasi; Abid Ullah Shah; Sathaiya Veerapathiran; Mohsin Zaki | Delray Rawlins (c); Derrick Brangman; Zeko Burgess; Allan Douglas; Chris Douglas; Terryn Fray; Kamau Leverock; Tre Manders; Cejay Outerbridge; Jermal Proctor; Jarryd Richardson (wk); Dominic Sabir; Marcus Scotland; Chare Smith; Sinclair Smith (wk) | Gareth Berg (c); Marcus Campopiano; Stefano di Bartolomeo; Rakibul Hasan; Fida Hussain; Damith Kosala; Wayne Madsen; Nicholas Maiolo; Gian-Piero Meade (wk); Anthony Mosca; Nimna Pauththuwadura; Jaspreet Singh; Nikolai Smith; Grant Stewart | Mohammed Aslam (c); Usman Patel (vc, wk); Ilyas Ahmed; Mohammad Amin; Clinto Anto; Meet Bhavsar (wk); Adnan Idrees; Shiraz Khan; Sayed Monib; Yasin Patel; Shahrukh Quddus; Ravija Sandaruwan; Mohamed Shafeeq; Bilal Tahir |
| Malaysia | Saudi Arabia | Tanzania | Vanuatu |
| Virandeep Singh (c); Muhammad Amir; Aqeel Wahid; Syed Aziz; Khizar Hayat; Ahmad Faiz; Ainool Hafizs; Rizwan Haider; Sharvin Muniandy; Pavandeep Singh; Muhamad Syahadat; Vijay Unni; Muhammad Wafiq; Zubaidi Zulkifle | Hisham Sheikh (c); Ishtiaq Ahmad; Manan Ali (wk); Atif-Ur-Rehman; Haseeb Ghafoor (wk); Usman Khalid; Faisal Khan; Usman Najeeb; Shahzaib; Kashif Siddique; Zain Ul Abidin; Waji Ul Hassan; Waqar Ul Hassan; Abdul Waheed; Imran Yousaf | Abhik Patwa (c); Ramesh Alluri; Akhil Anil; Laksh Bakrania; Mohamed Issa; Zamoyoni Jabeneke; Salum Jumbe; Ally Kimote; Omary Kitunda (wk); Kassim Nassoro; Yalinde Nkanya; Johnson Nyambo; Ivan Selemani; SanjayKumar Thakor | Joshua Rasu (c); Ronald Tari (vc); Jarryd Allan (wk); Tim Cutler; Junior Kaltapau; Andrew Mansale; Patrick Matautaava; Williamsing Nalisa; Nalin Nipiko; Simpson Obed; Apolinaire Stephen; Clement Tommy (wk); Jamal Vira (wk); Darren Wotu |

== Group stage ==
=== Group A ===
| Pos | Team | Pld | W | L | NR | Pts | NRR | Qualification |
|---|---|---|---|---|---|---|---|---|
| 1 | Italy | 3 | 2 | 1 | 0 | 4 | 0.574 | Advanced to the Super 6 |
| 2 | Kuwait | 3 | 2 | 1 | 0 | 4 | 0.292 | Advanced to the Super 6 |
| 3 | Bermuda | 3 | 1 | 2 | 0 | 2 | −1.108 | Advanced to the Super 6 |
| 4 | Saudi Arabia | 3 | 1 | 2 | 0 | 2 | 0.298 | Eliminated |

Source: ESPNcricinfo
Rules for classification: 1) Points; 2) Wins; 3) Results of games between tied teams; 4) Net run rate

22 February 2024
09:30
Scorecard

| Italy; 305/8 (50 overs) | v | Bermuda; 148 (36.2 overs) |
| Marcus Campopiano 101 (117); Kamau Leverock 5/58 (10 overs) | | Terryn Fray 73 (99); Rakibul Hasan 3/35 (9 overs) |

Italy won by 157 runs
Selangor Turf Club, Seri Kembangan
Umpires: Viswanadan Kalidas (Mas) and Sarika Prasad (Sin)
Player of the match: Marcus Campopiano (Ita)

- Bermuda won the toss and elected to field.
- Allan Douglas, Chare Smith, Marcus Scotland (Ber), Fida Hussain and Stefano di Bartolomeo (Ita) all made their List A debuts.
- Marcus Campopiano (Ita) scored his first century in List A cricket.

22 February 2024
09:30
Scorecard

| Saudi Arabia; 231 (49.1 overs) | v | Kuwait; 134 (35 overs) |
| Kashif Siddique 71 (94); Mohamed Shafeeq 3/37 (6 overs) | | Mohammed Aslam 57* (84); Usman Najeeb 3/23 (7 overs) |

Saudi Arabia won by 97 runs
Bayuemas Oval, Pandamaran
Umpires: Prageeth Rambukwella (SL) and Ramasamy Venkatesh (HK)
Player of the match: Kashif Siddique (Sau)

- Kuwait won the toss and elected to field.
- Ilyas Ahmed, Clinto Anto, Meet Bhavsar, Adnan Idrees, Shiraz Khan, Usman Patel, Yasin Patel, Mohamed Shafeeq, Bilal Tahir (Kuw), Ishtiaq Ahmad, Manan Ali, Atif-Ur-Rehman, Faisal Khan, Usman Najeeb, Hisham Sheikh, Kashif Siddique, Zain Ul Abidin, Waji Ul Hassan, Waqar Ul Hassan and Abdul Waheed (Sau) all made their List A debuts.

23 February 2024
09:30
Scorecard

| Italy; 284/7 (50 overs) | v | Saudi Arabia; 163/6 (37.4 overs) |
| Wayne Madsen 103 (92); Usman Najeeb 2/40 (7 overs) | | Hisham Sheikh 59* (101); Stefano di Bartolomeo 3/30 (7 overs) |

Italy won by 52 runs (DLS method)
UKM-YSD Cricket Oval, Bangi
Umpires: Akbar Ali (UAE) and Sanjay Gurung (Nep)
Player of the match: Wayne Madsen (Ita)

- Saudi Arabia won the toss and elected to field.
- No further play was possible due to rain.
- Shahzaib (Sau) made his List A debut.

25 February 2024
09:30
Scorecard

| Bermuda; 227 (44.3 overs) | v | Saudi Arabia; 223 (49.4 overs) |
| Delray Rawlins 75 (95); Zain Ul Abidin 3/27 (5.3 overs) | | Hisham Sheikh 45 (78); Dominic Sabir 3/33 (10 overs) |

Bermuda won by 4 runs
Selangor Turf Club, Seri Kembangan
Umpires: Tabarak Dar (HK) and Dedunu Silva (SL)
Player of the match: Dominic Sabir (Ber)

- Bermuda won the toss and elected to bat.
- Usman Khalid and Imran Yousaf (Sau) both made their List A debuts.

25 February 2024
09:30
Scorecard

| Kuwait; 216 (49.4 overs) | v | Italy; 86 (25 overs) |
| Mohammad Amin 61 (84); Gareth Berg 3/36 (10 overs) | | Grant Stewart 21 (11); Yasin Patel 3/11 (7 overs) |

Kuwait won by 130 runs
Bayuemas Oval, Pandamaran
Umpires: Sanjay Gurung (Nep) and Viswanadan Kalidas (Mas)
Player of the match: Mohammad Amin (Kuw)

- Kuwait won the toss and elected to bat.
- Mohammad Amin and Shahrukh Quddus (Kuw) both made their List A debuts.

26 February 2024
09:30
Scorecard

| Bermuda; 226/9 (50 overs) | v | Kuwait; 229/5 (48 overs) |
| Terryn Fray 50 (86); Sayed Monib 5/40 (10 overs) | | Meet Bhavsar 101 (131); Zeko Burgess 1/25 (6 overs) |

Kuwait won by 5 wickets
UKM-YSD Cricket Oval, Bangi
Umpires: Viswanadan Kalidas (Mas) and Prageeth Rambukwella (SL)
Player of the match: Meet Bhavsar (Kuw)

- Bermuda won the toss and elected to bat.
- Jarryd Richardson (Ber) and Ilyas Ahmed (Kuw) both made their List A debuts.
- Sayed Monib (Kuw) took his first five-wicket haul in List A cricket.
- Meet Bhavsar (Kuw) scored his first century in List A cricket.

=== Group B ===
| Pos | Team | Pld | W | L | NR | Pts | NRR | Qualification |
|---|---|---|---|---|---|---|---|---|
| 1 | Bahrain | 3 | 2 | 1 | 0 | 4 | 0.713 | Advanced to the Super 6 |
| 2 | Tanzania | 3 | 2 | 1 | 0 | 4 | 0.633 | Advanced to the Super 6 |
| 3 | Vanuatu | 3 | 1 | 2 | 0 | 2 | −0.791 | Advanced to the Super 6 |
| 4 | Malaysia | 3 | 1 | 2 | 0 | 2 | −0.742 | Eliminated |

Source: ESPNcricinfo
Rules for classification: 1) Points; 2) Wins; 3) Results of games between tied teams; 4) Net run rate

22 February 2024
09:30
Scorecard

| Bahrain; 266/7 (50 overs) | v | Vanuatu; 157 (48.1 overs) |
| Haider Butt 98 (105); Nalin Nipiko 5/43 (9 overs) | | Andrew Mansale 32 (30); Ali Dawood 2/13 (8 overs) |

Bahrain won by 109 runs
UKM-YSD Cricket Oval, Bangi
Umpires: Akbar Ali (UAE) and Tabarak Dar (HK)
Player of the match: Haider Butt (Bhr)

- Vanuatu won the toss and elected to field.
- Imran Anwar, Junaid Aziz, Shabaz Badar, Haider Butt, Rizwan Butt, Sachin Kumar, Prashant Kurup (Bhr) and Tim Cutler (Van) all made their List A debuts.

23 February 2024
09:30
Scorecard

| Tanzania; 203 (48.2 overs) | v | Vanuatu; 126 (40.5 overs) |
| Akhil Anil 47 (61); Patrick Matautaava 3/23 (8.2 overs) | | Jarryd Allan 31 (30); Kassim Nassoro 4/28 (8.5 overs) |

Tanzania won by 77 runs
Bayuemas Oval, Pandamaran
Umpires: Harikrishna Pillai (Oma) and Sarika Prasad (Sin)
Player of the match: Omary Kitunda (Tan)

- Tanzania won the toss and elected to bat.
- Akhil Anil, Laksh Bakrania, Mohamed Issa, Zamoyoni Jabeneke, Salum Jumbe, Ally Kimote, Omary Kitunda, Kassim Nassoro, Abhik Patwa, Ivan Selemani, SanjayKumar Thakor (Tan) all made their List A debuts.

23 February 2024
09:30
Scorecard

| Bahrain; 207/9 (50 overs) | v | Malaysia; 189 (49.1 overs) |
| Ahmer Bin Nisar 87* (85); Khizar Hayat 3/20 (10 overs) | | Sharvin Muniandy 46 (86); Rizwan Butt 4/37 (9.1 overs) |

Bahrain won by 18 runs
Selangor Turf Club, Seri Kembangan
Umpires: Prageeth Rambukwella (SL) and Dedunu Silva (SL)
Player of the match: Ahmer Bin Nisar (Bhr)

- Bahrain won the toss and elected to bat.

25 February 2024
09:30
Scorecard

| Tanzania; 247/9 (50 overs) | v | Malaysia; 249/9 (50 overs) |
| Mohamed Issa 43 (43); Pavandeep Singh 3/32 (8 overs) | | Ahmad Faiz 53 (74); Salum Jumbe 3/66 (10 overs) |

Malaysia won by 1 wicket
UKM-YSD Cricket Oval, Bangi
Umpires: Harikrishna Pillai (Oma) and Ramasamy Venkatesh (HK)
Player of the match: Ahmad Faiz (Mas)

- Tanzania won the toss and elected to bat.

26 February 2024
09:30
Scorecard

| Tanzania; 173 (38.3 overs) | v | Bahrain; 153 (48.2 overs) |
| Ivan Selemani 82 (70); Ali Dawood 3/12 (5.3 overs) | | Haider Butt 51 (92); Ally Kimote 4/36 (10 overs) |

Tanzania won by 20 runs
Selangor Turf Club, Seri Kembangan
Umpires: Akbar Ali (UAE) and Ramasamy Venkatesh (HK)
Player of the match: Ally Kimote (Tan)

- Tanzania won the toss and elected to bat.

26 February 2024
09:30
Scorecard

| Malaysia; 124 (38 overs) | v | Vanuatu; 125/7 (29 overs) |
| Aqeel Wahid 44 (79); Joshua Rasu 4/31 (10 overs) | | Andrew Mansale 29 (32); Khizar Hayat 5/26 (9 overs) |

Vanuatu won by 3 wickets
Bayuemas Oval, Pandamaran
Umpires: Tabarak Dar (HK) and Sarika Prasad (Sin)
Player of the match: Joshua Rasu (Van)

- Vanuatu won the toss and elected to field.
- Aqeel Wahid (Mas) made his List A debut.
- Khizar Hayat (Mas) took his first five-wicket haul in List A cricket.

== Super 6 ==
| Pos | Team | Pld | W | L | NR | Pts | NRR | Qualification |
|---|---|---|---|---|---|---|---|---|
| 1 | Kuwait | 5 | 5 | 0 | 0 | 10 | 2.215 | Qualified for the 2024–2026 Cricket World Cup Challenge League |
| 2 | Italy | 5 | 3 | 2 | 0 | 6 | 1.163 | Qualified for the 2024–2026 Cricket World Cup Challenge League |
| 3 | Bahrain | 5 | 3 | 2 | 0 | 6 | 0.565 | Qualified for the 2024–2026 Cricket World Cup Challenge League |
| 4 | Tanzania | 5 | 3 | 2 | 0 | 6 | −0.356 | Qualified for the 2024–2026 Cricket World Cup Challenge League |
| 5 | Vanuatu | 5 | 1 | 4 | 0 | 2 | −1.999 | Eliminated |
| 6 | Bermuda | 5 | 0 | 5 | 0 | 0 | −1.590 | Eliminated |

Source: ESPNcricinfo
Rules for classification: 1) Points; 2) Wins; 3) Results of games between tied teams; 4) Net run rate

28 February 2024
09:30
Scorecard

| Kuwait; 360/4 (50 overs) | v | Vanuatu; 132 (39.1 overs) |
| Meet Bhavsar 132 (139); Williamsing Nalisa 2/45 (10 overs) | | Ronald Tari 48 (71); Sayed Monib 3/12 (4.1 overs) |

Kuwait won by 228 runs
Selangor Turf Club, Seri Kembangan
Umpires: Sanjay Gurung (Nep) and Prageeth Rambukwella (SL)
Player of the match: Meet Bhavsar (Kuw)

- Kuwait won the toss and elected to bat.

28 February 2024
09:30
Scorecard

| Italy; 218 (47.1 overs) | v | Bahrain; 222/5 (47.2 overs) |
| Gareth Berg 47 (39); Rizwan Butt 4/20 (9 overs) | | Haider Butt 99 (120); Fida Hussain 2/27 (6 overs) |

Bahrain won by 5 wickets
UKM-YSD Cricket Oval, Bangi
Umpires: Sarika Prasad (Sin) and Dedunu Silva (SL)
Player of the match: Haider Butt (Bhr)

- Italy won the toss and elected to bat.

28 February 2024
09:30
Scorecard

| Tanzania; 239 (46.3 overs) | v | Bermuda; 112 (34.3 overs) |
| Akhil Anil 68 (87); Cejay Outerbridge 4/46 (9 overs) | | Terryn Fray 67 (84); Kassim Nassoro 4/7 (7.3 overs) |

Tanzania won by 127 runs
Bayuemas Oval, Pandamaran
Umpires: Akbar Ali (UAE) and Harikrishna Pillai (Oma)
Player of the match: Kassim Nassoro (Tan)

- Tanzania won the toss and elected to bat.
- Cejay Outerbridge and Jermal Proctor (Ber) both made their List A debuts.

1 March 2024
09:30
Scorecard

| Vanuatu; 153 (47 overs) | v | Bermuda; 122 (24.5 overs) |
| Joshua Rasu 53 (95); Derrick Brangman 2/21 (10 overs) | | Delray Rawlins 31 (32); Tim Cutler 4/35 (7.5 overs) |

Vanuatu won by 31 runs
Selangor Turf Club, Seri Kembangan
Umpires: Tabarak Dar (HK) and Ramasamy Venkatesh (HK)
Player of the match: Joshua Rasu (Van)

- Bermuda won the toss and elected to field.

1 March 2024
09:30
Scorecard

| Bahrain; 202 (49.4 overs) | v | Kuwait; 186/5 (40.3 overs) |
| Junaid Aziz 62 (128); Shahrukh Quddus 4/30 (9 overs) | | Meet Bhavsar 71 (92); Rizwan Butt 2/44 (9 overs) |

Kuwait won by 5 wickets (DLS method)
UKM-YSD Cricket Oval, Bangi
Umpires: Viswanadan Kalidas (Mas) and Harikrishna Pillai (Oma)
Player of the match: Mohammad Amin (Kuw)

- Kuwait won the toss and elected to field.
- Kuwait were set a revised target of 185 runs from 43 overs due to rain.

1 March 2024
09:30
Scorecard

| Italy; 325/8 (50 overs) | v | Tanzania; 163 (32.5 overs) |
| Wayne Madsen 110 (71); Johnson Nyambo 3/50 (7 overs) | | Kassim Nassoro 50 (61); Nicholas Maiolo 3/26 (10 overs) |

Italy won by 162 runs
Bayuemas Oval, Pandamaran
Umpires: Sanjay Gurung (Nep) and Dedunu Silva (SL)
Player of the match: Wayne Madsen (Ita)

- Italy won the toss and elected to bat.
- Johnson Nyambo and Yalinde Nkanya (Tan) both made their List A debuts.

3 March 2024
09:30
Scorecard

| Kuwait; 296/9 (50 overs) | v | Tanzania; 145 (33.4 overs) |
| Mohammad Amin 73 (75); Ally Kimote 3/70 (9 overs) | | Salum Jumbe 51 (44); Yasin Patel 4/51 (8.4 overs) |

Kuwait won by 151 runs
Selangor Turf Club, Seri Kembangan
Umpires: Viswanadan Kalidas (Mas) and Sarika Prasad (Sin)
Player of the match: Mohammad Amin (Kuw)

- Kuwait won the toss and elected to bat.

3 March 2024
09:30
Scorecard

| Vanuatu; 102 (41.2 overs) | v | Italy; 105/8 (25.4 overs) |
| Patrick Matautaava 22 (43); Nicholas Maiolo 2/16 (8 overs) | | Nicholas Maiolo 23 (33); Joshua Rasu 5/32 (10 overs) |

Italy won by 2 wickets
UKM-YSD Cricket Oval, Bangi
Umpires: Akbar Ali (UAE) and Ramasamy Venkatesh (HK)
Player of the match: Joshua Rasu (Van)

- Vanuatu won the toss and elected to bat.
- Joshua Rasu (Van) took his first five-wicket haul in List A cricket.

3 March 2024
09:30
Scorecard

| Bahrain; 238 (49.2 overs) | v | Bermuda; 131/8 (25 overs) |
| Prashant Kurup 79 (103); Derrick Brangman 4/48 (9 overs) | | Derrick Brangman 40* (42); Abdul Majid 3/13 (5 overs) |

Bahrain won by 30 runs (DLS method)
Bayuemas Oval, Pandamaran
Umpires: Tabarak Dar (HK) and Prageeth Rambukwella (SL)

- Bahrain won the toss and elected to bat.
- Bermuda were set a revised target of 162 runs from 25 overs due to rain.
- Sathaiya Veerapathiran and Mohsin Zaki (Bhr) both made their List A debuts.

== Final standings ==
| Pos. | Teams | Qualification |
|---|---|---|
| 1 | Kuwait | Qualified for the 2024–2026 ICC Cricket World Cup Challenge League |
| 2 | Italy | Qualified for the 2024–2026 ICC Cricket World Cup Challenge League |
| 3 | Bahrain | Qualified for the 2024–2026 ICC Cricket World Cup Challenge League |
| 4 | Tanzania | Qualified for the 2024–2026 ICC Cricket World Cup Challenge League |
| 5 | Vanuatu | Eliminated from the 2027 Cricket World Cup qualification |
| 6 | Bermuda | Eliminated from the 2027 Cricket World Cup qualification |
| 7 | Saudi Arabia | Eliminated from the 2027 Cricket World Cup qualification |
| 8 | Malaysia | Eliminated from the 2027 Cricket World Cup qualification |
