= 2027 Cricket World Cup =

14th edition of the Cricket World Cup

2027 ICC Men's Cricket World Cup
- Dates: 2 October – 21 November 2027
- Administrator: International Cricket Council
- Cricket format: One Day International
- Tournament format(s): Preliminary stage, Group stage, Super 7 and Knockout stage
- Hosts: South Africa; Zimbabwe; Namibia
- Participants: 14
- Matches: 57

The 2027 ICC Men's Cricket World Cup will be the 14th edition of the Cricket World Cup, the quadrennial international men's cricket championship contested by the national teams of the member associations of ICC. It is scheduled to be played in South Africa, Zimbabwe, and Namibia from 2 October to 21 November 2027. This will be the second time that South Africa and Zimbabwe will have co-hosted the tournament, having co-hosted the 2003 edition, while Namibia will host it for the first time.

== Background ==
The Cricket World Cup is a quadrennial One Day International tournament played between men's national cricket teams, organized by the International Cricket Council (ICC). The tournament is held every four years, and was first played in 1975 in England. The last tournament, held in 2023 in India was contested by 10 teams. Australia are the defending champions, having defeated India in the final of the previous edition.

In November 2021, the ICC announced that the 2027 Cricket World Cup will be played in South Africa, Zimbabwe and Namibia.

=== Format ===
On 15 July 2026, the ICC announced a new format for the tournament, which is intended to increase the competitiveness of matches and reduce the overall duration of the tournament, while maintaining a 14-team field.

- Round 1 – Super Series (3 matches) –The three lowest-seeded teams in the field will compete in a three-match play-in round, played in round-robin format. The winner of this stage will advance to the 12-team main pool for the second round.
- Round 2 (30 matches) – The 12 teams will then be split into two groups of six; the top three teams from each group, along with the best fourth-placed team across both groups, will advance to the Super 7 stage.
- Round 3 – Super 7 (21 matches) – The seven qualified teams will compete in a single round-robin pool, with the top four teams qualifying for the semi-finals.
- Knockout stage (3 matches) – The first-placed team will face the fourth-placed team, while the second-placed and third-placed teams will meet in the other semi-final. The winners of the two semi-finals will advance the final.

=== Preparations ===
In preparation for the 2027 Cricket World Cup, a 15-member organising committee of the tournament was finalised in August 2025. Trevor Manuel was named chair. Former Deputy President of South Africa, Phumzile Mlambo-Ngcuka was also named as one of the seven independent directors of the tournament.

=== Schedule ===
The ICC and CSA announced the groups and fixtures on 1 October 2026 in Cape Town, with the tournament scheduled to take place from 2 October to 21 November 2027. The tournament consists of 57 matches played across eight venues in South Africa, three venues in Zimbabwe and one venue in Namibia.

== Qualification ==
Hosts South Africa and Zimbabwe will qualify automatically for the tournament, along with the top eight teams in the ICC ODI rankings as of 30 September 2026. The remaining four places will be decided through qualifying tournaments. Although Namibia will co-host the competition for the first time, they will not be guaranteed a spot because they are not a full ICC member and, as a result, will have to go through the standard qualification pathway.

List of teams qualified for the 2027 Cricket World Cup
Method of qualification	Date of qualification	Venues	No. of teams	Qualified teams
Hosts	16 November 2021	—N/a	2	South Africa
Hosts	16 November 2021	—N/a	2	Zimbabwe
ICC Men's ODI Team Rankings (Top 8 teams, excluding the hosts)	30 September 2026	—N/a	8	Afghanistan
ICC Men's ODI Team Rankings (Top 8 teams, excluding the hosts)	30 September 2026	—N/a	8	Australia
ICC Men's ODI Team Rankings (Top 8 teams, excluding the hosts)	30 September 2026	—N/a	8	Bangladesh
ICC Men's ODI Team Rankings (Top 8 teams, excluding the hosts)	30 September 2026	—N/a	8	England
ICC Men's ODI Team Rankings (Top 8 teams, excluding the hosts)	30 September 2026	—N/a	8	India
ICC Men's ODI Team Rankings (Top 8 teams, excluding the hosts)	30 September 2026	—N/a	8	New Zealand
ICC Men's ODI Team Rankings (Top 8 teams, excluding the hosts)	30 September 2026	—N/a	8	Pakistan
ICC Men's ODI Team Rankings (Top 8 teams, excluding the hosts)	30 September 2026	—N/a	8	Sri Lanka
2027 Cricket World Cup Qualifier	26 February – 21 March 2027	Namibia; South Africa	4	TBD
2027 Cricket World Cup Qualifier	26 February – 21 March 2027	Namibia; South Africa	4	TBD
2027 Cricket World Cup Qualifier	26 February – 21 March 2027	Namibia; South Africa	4	TBD
2027 Cricket World Cup Qualifier	26 February – 21 March 2027	Namibia; South Africa	4	TBD
Total			14	

== Venues ==
Cricket South Africa confirmed eight shortlisted venues in April 2024. In August 2025, it was announced that 44 matches would be hosted by South Africa across the eight venues, while Zimbabwe and Namibia would host the remaining 10 matches. Zimbabwe Cricket is currently building a stadium in Victoria Falls, officially named the Mosi-oa-Tunya International Cricket Stadium. As of July 2026, it is nearing completion, expected to be finished in August of the same year.

On 30 July 2026, the ICC announced the finalised list of twelve venues for the World Cup, with eight in South Africa, three in Zimbabwe, and one in Namibia.

The first and second semi-finals will be played at Newlands Cricket Ground in Cape Town and Centurion Park in Centurion respectively, while the final will be held at Wanderers Stadium in Johannesburg.

Venues in South Africa
A map of South Africa with pin-points on 2027 Cricket World Cup venues
Bloemfontein	Cape Town	Centurion	Durban	KuGompo City
Mangaung Oval	Newlands Cricket Ground	Centurion Park	Kingsmead Cricket Ground	Buffalo Park
Capacity: 20,000	Capacity: 25,000	Capacity: 22,000	Capacity: 25,000	Capacity: 16,000
Matches: 5	Matches: 6 (Semi-final 1)	Matches: 5 (Semi-final 2)	Matches: 6	Matches: 4
	Newlands Cricket Ground in	Centurion Park in	Kingsmead Cricket Ground in	
	Gqeberha	Johannesburg	Paarl	
	St George's Park	Wanderers Stadium	Boland Park	
	Capacity: 19,000	Capacity: 34,000	Capacity: 10,000	
	Matches: 5	Matches: 6 (Final)	Matches: 4	
	St George's Park Cricket Ground in	Wanderers Stadium in	Boland Park in	
Venues in Zimbabwe			Venues in Namibia	
A map of Zimbabwe with pin-points on 2027 Cricket World Cup venues			A map of Namibia with pin-points on 2027 Cricket World Cup venues	
Bulawayo	Harare	Victoria Falls	Windhoek	
Queens Sports Club	Harare Sports Club	Mosi-oa-Tunya International Cricket Stadium	Namibia Cricket Ground	
Capacity: 12,500	Capacity: 10,000	Capacity: 10,000	Capacity: 7,000	
Matches: 2	Matches: 4	Matches: 4	Matches: 6	
	Harare Sports Club in			

== Super Series ==
The winner of the Qualifier will advance directly to the Second round whilst the teams that finished second, third and fourth will contest in the Super Series.

Super Series standings
Pos	Team	Pld	W	L	NR	Pts	NRR	Qualification
1	X1	0	0	0	0	0	—	Advance to the group stage
2	X2	0	0	0	0	0	—	
3	X3	0	0	0	0	0	—	

First match(es) will be played: unknown. Source:

Match 1
2 October 2027
10:00 UTC+2
Scorecard

TBA	v	TBA

Namibia Cricket Ground, Windhoek

Match 2
4 October 2027
10:00 UTC+2
Scorecard

TBA	v	TBA

Namibia Cricket Ground, Windhoek

Match 3
6 October 2027
10:00 UTC+2
Scorecard

TBA	v	TBA

Namibia Cricket Ground, Windhoek

== Group stage ==
The ICC announced the groups and fixtures on 1 October 2026, with group stage, which is the second round of the tournament played from 7 to 24 October 2027. The 10 teams along with the two other teams that advanced from the Qualifier and Super Series were divided into two groups of six with each team facing the other teams in the group. The group stage featured a total of 30 matches. The following table lists teams in order of their initial group stage seedings.

Group A	Group B
India; Australia; Pakistan; Afghanistan; Zimbabwe; (To be determined) Qualifier A	New Zealand; South Africa; Sri Lanka; England; Bangladesh; (To be determined) Qualifier B

=== Group A ===
Group A standings
Pos	Team	Pld	W	L	NR	Pts	NRR	Qualification
1	Afghanistan	0	0	0	0	0	—	Advance to the Super 7 stage
2	Australia	0	0	0	0	0	—	Advance to the Super 7 stage
3	India	0	0	0	0	0	—	Advance to the Super 7 stage
4	Pakistan	0	0	0	0	0	—	Advance to the Super 7 stage based on ranking
5	Zimbabwe (H)	0	0	0	0	0	—	
6	(To be determined) Qualifier A	0	0	0	0	0	—	

First match(es) will be played: 7 October 2027. Source: Cricinfo
(H) Host

Match 4
7 October 2027
10:00 UTC+2
Scorecard

Australia	v	India

Newlands Cricket Ground, Cape Town

Match 5
8 October 2027
10:00 UTC+2
Scorecard

Afghanistan	v	Pakistan

Centurion Park, Centurion

Match 7
9 October 2027
10:00 UTC+2
Scorecard

Zimbabwe	v	(To be determined) Qualifier A

Queens Sports Club, Bulawayo

Match 9
10 October 2027
10:00 UTC+2
Scorecard

India	v	Pakistan

Wanderers Stadium, Johannesburg

Match 11
11 October 2027
12:30 UTC+2 (D/N)
Scorecard

Zimbabwe	v	Afghanistan

Queens Sports Club, Bulawayo

Match 12
12 October 2027
10:00 UTC+2
Scorecard

Australia	v	(To be determined) Qualifier A

Boland Park, Paarl

Match 16
14 October 2027
10:00 UTC+2
Scorecard

Afghanistan	v	India

Centurion Park, Centurion

Match 17
15 October 2027
10:00 UTC+2
Scorecard

Pakistan	v	(To be determined) Qualifier A

Mangaung Oval, Bloemfontein

Match 18
15 October 2027
12:30 UTC+2 (D/N)
Scorecard

Zimbabwe	v	Australia

Harare Sports Club, Harare

Match 21
17 October 2027
10:00 UTC+2
Scorecard

India	v	(To be determined) Qualifier A

Mangaung Oval, Bloemfontein

Match 23
18 October 2027
10:00 UTC+2
Scorecard

Afghanistan	v	Australia

Buffalo Park, KuGompo City

Match 24
19 October 2027
10:00 UTC+2
Scorecard

Zimbabwe	v	Pakistan

Harare Sports Club, Harare

Match 28
21 October 2027
12:30 UTC+2 (D/N)
Scorecard

Afghanistan	v	(To be determined) Qualifier A

Buffalo Park, KuGompo City

Match 29
22 October 2027
10:00 UTC+2
Scorecard

Australia	v	Pakistan

Boland Park, Paarl

Match 33
24 October 2027
10:00 UTC+2
Scorecard

Zimbabwe	v	India

Mosi-oa-Tunya International Cricket Stadium, Victoria Falls

=== Group B ===
Group B standings
Pos	Team	Pld	W	L	NR	Pts	NRR	Qualification
1	Bangladesh	0	0	0	0	0	—	Advance to the Super 7 stage
2	England	0	0	0	0	0	—	Advance to the Super 7 stage
3	South Africa (H)	0	0	0	0	0	—	Advance to the Super 7 stage
4	Sri Lanka	0	0	0	0	0	—	Advance to the Super 7 stage based on ranking
5	New Zealand	0	0	0	0	0	—	
6	(To be determined) Qualifier B	0	0	0	0	0	—	

First match(es) will be played: 8 October 2027. Source: Cricinfo
(H) Host

Match 6
8 October 2027
12:30 UTC+2 (D/N)
Scorecard

Bangladesh	v	England

Namibia Cricket Ground, Windhoek

Match 8
9 October 2027
12:30 UTC+2 (D/N)
Scorecard

South Africa	v	New Zealand

Newlands Cricket Ground, Cape Town

Match 10
10 October 2027
12:30 UTC+2 (D/N)
Scorecard

Sri Lanka	v	(To be determined) Qualifier B

Namibia Cricket Ground, Windhoek

Match 13
12 October 2027
12:30 UTC+2 (D/N)
Scorecard

Bangladesh	v	New Zealand

Buffalo Park, KuGompo City

Match 14
13 October 2027
10:00 UTC+2
Scorecard

England	v	Sri Lanka

Namibia Cricket Ground, Windhoek

Match 15
13 October 2027
12:30 UTC+2 (D/N)
Scorecard

South Africa	v	(To be determined) Qualifier B

Boland Park, Paarl

Match 19
16 October 2027
10:00 UTC+2
Scorecard

Bangladesh	v	Sri Lanka

Kingsmead Cricket Ground, Durban

Match 20
16 October 2027
12:30 UTC+2 (D/N)
Scorecard

South Africa	v	England

St George's Park, Gqeberha

Match 22
17 October 2027
12:30 UTC+2 (D/N)
Scorecard

New Zealand	v	(To be determined) Qualifier B

Harare Sports Club, Harare

Match 25
19 October 2027
12:30 UTC+2 (D/N)
Scorecard

South Africa	v	Bangladesh

Kingsmead Cricket Ground, Durban

Match 26
20 October 2027
10:00 UTC+2
Scorecard

New Zealand	v	Sri Lanka

Wanderers Stadium, Johannesburg

Match 27
20 October 2027
12:30 UTC+2 (D/N)
Scorecard

England	v	(To be determined) Qualifier B

Harare Sports Club, Harare

Match 30
22 October 2027
12:30 UTC+2 (D/N)
Scorecard

South Africa	v	Sri Lanka

Wanderers Stadium, Johannesburg

Match 31
23 October 2027
10:00 UTC+2
Scorecard

England	v	New Zealand

St George's Park, Gqeberha

Match 32
23 October 2027
12:30 UTC+2 (D/N)
Scorecard

Bangladesh	v	(To be determined) Qualifier B

Centurion Park, Centurion

== Super 7 ==
The top three teams, along with the best fourth-placed team across both groups, will advance to the Super 7 stage. The Super 7 stage was played in a single round-robin format, with each team playing the other six teams. The top four teams advanced to the semifinals.

Prior to the tournament, seven teams were pre-seeded for the Super 7 stage based on the ODI rankings at the time: India (A1), Australia (A2), Pakistan (A3), England (A4/B4), New Zealand (B1), South Africa (B2) and Sri Lanka (B3).

Qualification		Super 7 stage			
Advanced from the group stage (Top 3 teams from each group, along with the best fourth-placed team)	A	A1	A2	A3	A4/B4
Advanced from the group stage (Top 3 teams from each group, along with the best fourth-placed team)	B	B1	B2	B3	A4/B4

Super 7 standings
Pos	Team	Pld	W	L	NR	Pts	NRR	Qualification
1	A1	0	0	0	0	0	—	Advance to the knockout stage
2	A2	0	0	0	0	0	—	Advance to the knockout stage
3	A3	0	0	0	0	0	—	Advance to the knockout stage
4	B1	0	0	0	0	0	—	Advance to the knockout stage
5	B2	0	0	0	0	0	—	
6	B3	0	0	0	0	0	—	
7	A4/B4	0	0	0	0	0	—	

First match(es) will be played: 25 October 2027. Source: Cricinfo

Match 34
25 October 2027
10:00 UTC+2
Scorecard

A2	v	B3

Wanderers Stadium, Johannesburg

Match 35
26 October 2027
10:00 UTC+2
Scorecard

B1	v	A3

St George's Park, Gqeberha

Match 36
27 October 2027
12:30 UTC+2 (D/N)
Scorecard

B2	v	A4/B4

Centurion Park, Centurion

Match 37
28 October 2027
10:00 UTC+2
Scorecard

A1	v	A2

Mosi-oa-Tunya International Cricket Stadium, Victoria Falls

Match 38
29 October 2027
10:00 UTC+2
Scorecard

B1	v	B3

Buffalo Park, KuGompo City

Match 39
30 October 2027
10:00 UTC+2
Scorecard

A3	v	A4/B4

Mosi-oa-Tunya International Cricket Stadium, Victoria Falls

Match 40
31 October 2027
12:30 UTC+2 (D/N)
Scorecard

B2	v	A1

Wanderers Stadium, Johannesburg

Match 41
1 November 2027
10:00 UTC+2
Scorecard

A2	v	B1

Mosi-oa-Tunya International Cricket Stadium, Victoria Falls

Match 42
2 November 2027
12:30 UTC+2 (D/N)
Scorecard

B3	v	A4/B4

Newlands Cricket Ground, Cape Town

Match 43
3 November 2027
12:30 UTC+2 (D/N)
Scorecard

B2	v	A3

Kingsmead Cricket Ground, Durban

Match 44
4 November 2027
10:00 UTC+2
Scorecard

A1	v	B1

Boland Park, Paarl

Match 45
5 November 2027
10:00 UTC+2
Scorecard

A2	v	A4/B4

Kingsmead Cricket Ground, Durban

Match 46
6 November 2027
12:30 UTC+2 (D/N)
Scorecard

B2	v	B3

Mangaung Oval, Bloemfontein

Match 47
7 November 2027
10:00 UTC+2
Scorecard

A1	v	A3

Newlands Cricket Ground, Cape Town

Match 48
8 November 2027
10:00 UTC+2
Scorecard

B1	v	A4/B4

Kingsmead Cricket Ground, Durban

Match 49
9 November 2027
12:30 UTC+2 (D/N)
Scorecard

B2	v	A2

St George's Park, Gqeberha

Match 50
10 November 2027
10:00 UTC+2
Scorecard

A3	v	B3

Mangaung Oval, Bloemfontein

Match 51
11 November 2027
10:00 UTC+2
Scorecard

A1	v	A4/B4

St George's Park, Gqeberha

Match 52
12 November 2027
12:30 UTC+2 (D/N)
Scorecard

B2	v	B1

Newlands Cricket Ground, Cape Town

Match 53
13 November 2027
10:00 UTC+2
Scorecard

A2	v	A3

Mangaung Oval, Bloemfontein

Match 54
14 November 2027
10:00 UTC+2
Scorecard

A1	v	B3

Kingsmead Cricket Ground, Durban

== Knockout stage ==
=== Bracket ===
Semi-finals
1	First placed team
4	Fourth placed team
2	Second placed team
3	Third placed team

Final
SF1W	Winner of Semi final 1
SF2W	Winner of Semi final 2

=== Semi-finals ===
Semi-final 1
17 November 2027
10:00 UTC+2
Scorecard

First placed team	v	Fourth placed team

Newlands Cricket Ground, Cape Town

Semi-final 2
18 November 2027
10:00 UTC+2
Scorecard

Second placed team	v	Third placed team

Centurion Park, Centurion

=== Final ===
21 November 2027
10:00 UTC+2
Scorecard

Winner of Semi final 1	v	Winner of Semi final 2

Wanderers Stadium, Johannesburg
