= ICC Men's ODI Team Rankings =

International cricket odi team rankings

- Administrator: International Cricket Council
- Creation: 2002 (24 years ago)
- Number of teams: 20
- Current top ranking: India (121 rating)
- Longest cumulative top ranking: Australia (194 months)
- Longest continuous top ranking: West Indies (65 months)
- Highest rating: Australia (142 rating)
- Last updated on: 22 Aug 2025.

The ICC Men's ODI Team Rankings (formerly known as the ICC ODI Championship) is an international One Day International (ODI) cricket rankings system of the International Cricket Council (ICC). After every ODI match, the two teams involved receive points based on a mathematical formula. Each team's points total is divided by their total number of matches played to give a rating, and all the teams are ranked in a table in order of rating.

By analogy to cricket batting averages, the points for winning an ODI match are always greater than the team's rating, increasing the rating, and the points for losing an ODI match are always less than the rating, reducing the rating. A drawn match between higher and lower rated teams will benefit the lower-rated team at the expense of the higher-rated team. An "average" team that wins as often as it loses while playing a mix of stronger and weaker teams should have a rating of 100.

As of 22 August 2025, India leads the ICC Men's ODI Team Rankings, with a rating of 124 from 36 weighted matches, while the lowest rated team, UAE, has a rating of 08 from 32 weighted matches.

Until 2013, the team ranked number one at the annual 1 April cut-off date received the ICC ODI Championship Shield and prize money. The rankings was used to award direct qualification for the Cricket World Cup in 2019 and will be used in the 2027.

== Current rankings ==
ICC Men's ODI Team Rankings
Team	Matches	Points	Rating
India	40	4,653	116
New Zealand	39	4,172	107
South Africa	34	3,547	104
Pakistan	37	3,838	104
Australia	38	3,796	100
England	41	3,886	95
Afghanistan	31	2,926	94
Sri Lanka	44	4,144	94
Bangladesh	41	3,304	81
West Indies	37	2,924	79
Zimbabwe	21	1,315	63
Scotland	28	1,260	45
Ireland	21	932	44
Netherlands	34	1,482	44
United States	30	1,228	41
Namibia	31	1,131	36
Nepal	38	1,178	31
United Arab Emirates	35	643	18
Oman	32	550	17
Canada	26	307	12
Source: ICC Men's ODI Team Rankings, 22 November 2026 See points calculations for more details.

== Associate rankings ==
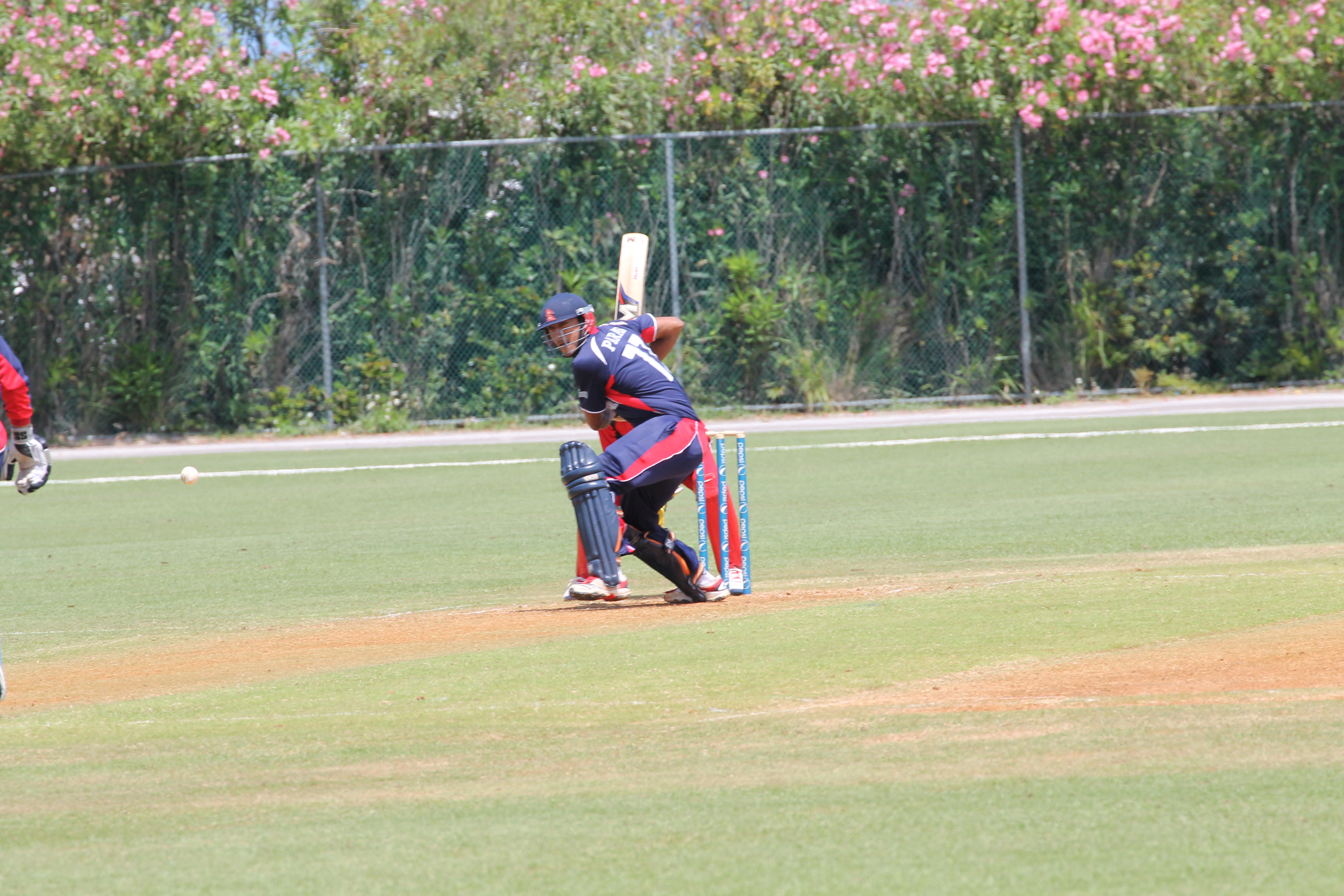
Nepal Captain Paras Khadka batting during the 2013 ICC World Cricket League Division Three in Bermuda

In late 2005, the International Cricket Council ranked the top non-Test nations from 11–30 to complement the Test nations' rankings in the ICC Men's ODI Team Rankings. The ICC used the results from the 2005 ICC Trophy and WCQS Division 2 competition (i.e. the primary qualification mechanisms for the 2007 Cricket World Cup) to rank the nations.

These rankings were used to seed the initial stage of the global World Cricket League. Teams ranked 11–16 were placed into Division 1; teams 17–20 were placed into Division 2; teams 21–24 were placed into Division 3; the remaining teams were placed into the upper divisions of their respective regional qualifiers.

Before 19 April 2009, the top six associates gained one day status. Kenya and Ireland both qualified to appear on the main rating table, Kenya from its existing status and Ireland for its two victories in the 2007 World Cup. Following their victory over Bangladesh in July 2010, the Netherlands joined the main table. Afghanistan, Canada and Scotland remained on the secondary table. In May 2009, the ICC added a rankings table for all associate members. This contained both global and regional placings. In June 2018, the four associates with ODI status were moved to the main ranking list.

== Historical rankings ==
The ICC provides ratings for the end of each month back to October 2002. This table lists the teams that have successively held the highest rating since that date, by whole month periods.

Team	Start	End	Total months	Cumulative months	Highest rating
Australia	October 2002	January 2007	52	52	140
South Africa	February 2007	February 2007	1	1	128
Australia	March 2007	February 2008	12	64	130
South Africa	March 2008	May 2008	3	4	127
Australia	June 2008	December 2008	7	71	131
South Africa	January 2009	August 2009	8	12	127
Australia	September 2009	August 2012	35	106	134
England	August 2012	January 2013	5	5	121
India	January 2013	January 2014	12	12	124
Australia	January 2014	September 2014	8	114	117
India	September 2014	October 2014	1	13	113
Australia	October 2014	October 2014	1	115	114
South Africa	October 2014	November 2014	½	13	115
India	November 2014	November 2014	½	14	117
Australia	November 2014	February 2017	26	141	129
South Africa	February 2017	February 2017	1	14	119
Australia	March 2017	March 2017	4 days	141	118
South Africa	March 2017	September 2017	6	20	123
India	September 2017	September 2017	4 days	14	120
South Africa	September 2017	September 2017	4 days	20	119
India	October 2017	October 2017	17 days	15	120
South Africa	October 2017	February 2018	4	24	120
India	February 2018	May 2018	3	18	123
England	May 2018	June 2019	14	19	127
India	June 2019	June 2019	5 days	18	123
England	June 2019	May 2021	22	41	135
New Zealand	May 2021	September 2022	16	16	121
England	September 2022	November 2022	2	43	119
New Zealand	November 2022	January 2023	2	18	116
England	January 2023	January 2023	3 days	43	113
India	January 2023	March 2023	2	20	115
Australia	March 2023	May 2023	2	143	115
Pakistan	May 2023	May 2023	2 days		113
Australia	May 2023	August 2023	3	146	118
Pakistan	August 2023	September 2023	13 days		120
Australia	September 2023	September 2023	3 days	146	121
Pakistan	September 2023	September 2023	6 days	1	118
Australia	September 2023	September 2023	3 days	146	115
Pakistan	September 2023	September 2023	5 days	1	115
India	September 2023	Present	39	59	124

In 2011, the ICC applied its rating system to results since 1981, providing ratings for the end of each month back to 1981, further indicating Australia's historical dominance in ODI Cricket with the highest number of months ranked first (200 months). The table only begins from 1981 as, prior to this date, there is not enough data available due to the infrequency of matches and the small number of competing teams in the earlier periods.

The teams that have successively held the highest rating since January 1981 until September 2002, by whole month periods, are:

Team	Start	End	Total months	Cumulative months
England	January 1981	February 1981	2	2
West Indies	June 1981	November 1981	6	6
England	December 1981	December 1981	1	3
West Indies	January 1982	May 1987	65	71
England	August 1987	March 1988	8	11
West Indies	April 1988	May 1988	2	73
England	August 1988	May 1989	10	21
West Indies	August 1989	December 1989	5	78
Australia	January 1990	March 1990	3	3
West Indies	April 1990	April 1990	1	79
Australia	May 1990	May 1990	1	4
West Indies	July 1990	July 1990	1	80
Australia	August 1990	November 1990	4	8
Pakistan	December 1990	January 1991	2	2
Australia	February 1991	May 1991	4	12
Pakistan	August 1991	August 1991	1	3
Australia	October 1991	May 1992	8	20
England	August 1992	March 1993	8	29
West Indies	April 1993	April 1993	1	81
Australia	May 1993	July 1993	3	23
West Indies	August 1993	November 1994	16	97
India	December 1994	March 1995	4	4
West Indies	April 1995	May 1995	2	99
India	August 1995	October 1995	3	7
England	November 1995	December 1995	2	31
Australia	January 1996	April 1996	4	27
South Africa	May 1996	February 2000	46	46
Australia	March 2000	January 2002	23	50
South Africa	February 2002	February 2002	1	47
Australia	March 2002	September 2002	7	57
Reference: Historical Rankings

The summary of teams that have held the highest rating since 1981 until present by whole month periods, are:

Team	Total months	Highest rating
Australia	204	140
West Indies	99	141
South Africa	71	134
England	66	135
India	66	127
New Zealand	18	121
Pakistan	4	131
Reference: Historical Rankings updated to 9 March 2025

Consecutive months

#	Team	Years
65	West Indies	Jan 1982-May 1987
59	Australia	Mar 2002-Jan 2007
46	South Africa	May 1996-Feb 2000
39*	India	Sept 2023-Present
35	Australia	Sept 2009-Aug 2012
26	Australia	Nov 2014-Feb 2017
23	Australia	Mar 2000-Jan 2002
22	England	Jun 2019-May 2021
16	West Indies	Aug 1993-Nov 1994
16	New Zealand	May 2021-Sept 2022

== ICC ODI championship (2002–2013) ==
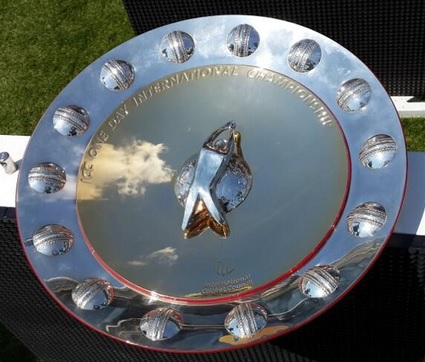
ICC ODI Championship Shield

The rankings system was formerly called the ICC ODI championship and, until 2013, the team at the top of the table at the start of each April was awarded the ICC ODI Championship Shield. Like a 2 euro coin, the shield features an inner circle of gold-coloured metal and is surrounded by a ring of silver-coloured metal. It was first presented in December 2002, when Australian captain Ricky Ponting received the award.

It was last presented in July 2013, when Indian captain MS Dhoni received the award.

Year	Nation
2002	Australia (6)
2003	Australia (6)
2004	Australia (6)
2005	Australia (6)
2006	Australia (6)
2007	Australia (6)
2008	South Africa (2)
2009	South Africa (2)
2010	Australia (9)
2011	Australia (9)
2012	Australia (9)
2013	India (1)

== Points calculations ==
=== Time period ===
Each team scores points based on the results of their matches over the last 3−4 years − the matches played in the 12–24 months since the May before last, plus the matches played in the 24 months before that, for which the matches played and points earned both count half. For example:

	May 2010	May 2011	May 2012	May 2013	May 2014	May 2015
Between May 2013 and April 2014:		Results that were achieved during this period have 50% weighting		Results that were achieved during this period have 100% weighting		
Between May 2014 and April 2015:			Results that were achieved during this period have 50% weighting		Results that were achieved during this period have 100% weighting	

Each May, the matches and points earned between 3 and 4 years ago are removed, and the matches and points earned between 1 and 2 years ago switch from 100% weighting to 50% weighting. For example, on 1 May 2014, the matches played between May 2010 and April 2011 were removed, and the matches played between May 2012 and April 2013 switched to 50% weighting (the matches from May 2011 to April 2012 would have already been at 50% following the previous rerating). This happens overnight, so can result in teams changing positions in the ranking table despite no one playing.

=== Find the points earned from a match ===
Each time two teams play another match, the rankings table is updated as follows, based on the ratings of the teams immediately before they played. To determine the teams' new ratings after a particular match, first calculate the points earned from the match:

If the gap between the ratings of the two teams before the match was less than 40 points, then:

Match result	Points earned
Win	Opponent's rating + 50
Tie	Opponent's rating
Lose	Opponent's rating − 50

If the gap between the ratings of the two teams before the match was at least 40 points, then:

Match result	Points earned
Stronger team wins	Own rating + 10
Weaker team loses	Own rating − 10
Stronger team ties	Own rating − 40
Weaker team ties	Own rating + 40
Stronger team loses	Own rating − 90
Weaker team wins	Own rating + 90

- Each team's rating is equal to its total points scored divided by the total matches played. (Series are not significant in these calculations).
- Add the match points scored to the points already scored (in previous matches as reflected by the Table), add one to the number of matches played, and determine the new rating.
- Points earned by teams depend on the opponent's ratings, therefore this system needed to assign base ratings to teams when it started.

See also a detailed example at: ICC Men's T20I Team Rankings#Example

== Year end Historical Ranking ==
In 2011, David Kendix, the ICC's official statistician retrospectively applied its rating system to results since 1981, providing ratings for the end of each month back to 1981.

Year	Team	Rating
1981	England	121
1982	West Indies	133
1983	West Indies	132
1984	West Indies	133
1985	West Indies	139
1986	West Indies	140
1987	England	133
1988	England	132
1989	England	119
1990	Australia	122
1991	Australia	127
1992	England	120
1993	West Indies	115
1994	India	114
1995	England	113

Year	Team	Rating
1996	South Africa	121
1997	South Africa	134
1998	South Africa	132
1999	South Africa	129
2000	Australia	125
2001	Australia	128
2002	Australia	131
2003	Australia	136
2004	Australia	136
2005	Australia	135
2006	Australia	131
2007	Australia	130
2008	Australia	131
2009	Australia	130
2010	Australia	128

Year	Team	Rating
2011	Australia	130
2012	England	121
2013	India	120
2014	Australia	117
2015	Australia	127
2016	Australia	120
2017	South Africa	120
2018	England	126
2019	England	125
2020	England	123
2021	New Zealand	121
2022	New Zealand	116
2023	India	121
2024	India	118
2025	India	124
2026	India	119

== See also ==
- ICC Men's Test Team Rankings
- ICC Men's T20I Team Rankings
- World Cricket League
- International cricket
- ICC Women's ODI and T20I rankings
- ICC Player Rankings
