= List of Papua New Guinean first-class cricketers =

This is a list in alphabetical order of Papua New Guinean cricketers who have played first-class cricket. Papua New Guinea first played first-class in the 2015–2017 ICC Intercontinental Cup against the Netherlands. The team played seven first-class matches in the tournament, at the conclusion of which the Intercontinental Cup was discontinued. Only one Papua New Guinean-born cricketer has played first-class cricket for a team besides Papua New Guinea, Geraint Jones, who played county cricket in England, in addition to appearing in Test cricket for England.

The details below are the player's usual name followed by the years in which he was active as a first-class player and then his name is given as it would appear on modern match scorecards. Players are shown to the end of the 2017–18 season.

As of 5 February 2022

== A ==
- Charles Amini (2015–2015–16) : C. J. A. Amini

== B ==
- Dogodo Bau (2016–17) : D. Bau
- Sese Bau (2015/16–2017–18) : S. Bau

== D ==
- Mahuru Dai (2015–2017–18) : M. D. Dai
- Kiplin Doriga (2017–18) : K. Doriga

== G ==
- Willie Gavera (2015–2016–17) : W. T. Gavera

== J ==
- Geraint Jones (2001–2015): G. O. Jones

== M ==
- Vani Morea (2015–2017–18) : V. V. Morea

== N ==
- Loa Nou (2015–2015–16) : L. Nou

== P ==
- Nosaina Pokana (2016/17–2017–18) : N. Pokana

== R ==
- Damien Ravu (2017–18) : D. A. Ravu
- John Reva (2015–2017–18) : J. B. Reva

== S ==
- Lega Siaka (2015–2017–18) : L. Siaka
- Chad Soper (2015/16–2017–18) : C. A. Soper

== U ==
- Tony Ura (2015–2017–18) : T. P. Ura

== V ==
- Assad Vala (2015–2017–18) : A. Vala
- Norman Vanua (2015–2017–18) : N. Vanua
- Jack Vare (2015–2017–18) : J. N. T. Vare

== See also ==
- List of Papua New Guinea ODI cricketers
- List of Papua New Guinea Twenty20 International cricketers
