= Papua New Guinea at the Men's T20 World Cup =

History of Papua New Guinea national team at T20 World Cup

The Papua New Guinea national cricket team is one of the associate members of the International Cricket Council (ICC), they are nicknamed as the Barramundis. Papua New Guinea qualified for their maiden T20 World Cup in 2021, after finishing as runners-up of the 2019 qualifier, the team failed to make it past the first round. They made their reappearance at the tournament in the 2024 edition. In two editions that they have participated, the team is yet to register a win in World Cup.

== T20 World Cup record ==
Men's T20 World Cup record										Qualification record (Note: WCL Division One served as the qualifier for the 2007 edition.)				
Year	Round	Position	Pld	W	L	T	NR	Ab (Note: Abandoned matches are not counted in the official records.)	Cap.	Pld	W	L	T	NR
(South Africa) 2007	Did not enter									Did not enter				
(England) 2009	Did not enter									Did not enter				
(Cricket West Indies) 2010	Did not enter									Did not enter				
(Sri Lanka) 2012	Did not qualify									15	10	5	0	0
(Bangladesh) 2014	Did not qualify									17	11	5	0	1
(India) 2016	Did not qualify									14	10	3	0	1
(United Arab Emirates) (Oman) 2021	First round	16/16	3	0	3	0	0	0	Assad Vala	18	15	2	0	1
(Australia) 2022	Did not qualify									5	2	3	0	0
(United States) (Cricket West Indies) 2024	Group stage	19/20	4	0	4	0	0	0	Assad Vala	6	6	0	0	0
(India) (Sri Lanka) 2026	Did not qualify									2	0	2	0	0
(Australia) (New Zealand) 2028	To be determined									To be determined				
Total	0 Titles	2/10	7	0	7	0	0	0	—N/a	77	54	20	0	3

=== Record by opponents ===
Opponent	M	W	L	T+W	T+L	NR	Ab	Win %	First played
Afghanistan	1	0	1	0	0	0	0	0.00	2024
Bangladesh	1	0	1	0	0	0	0	0.00	2021
New Zealand	1	0	1	0	0	0	0	0.00	2024
Oman	1	0	1	0	0	0	0	0.00	2021
Scotland	1	0	1	0	0	0	0	0.00	2021
Uganda	1	0	1	0	0	0	0	0.00	2024
West Indies	1	0	1	0	0	0	0	0.00	2024
Total	7	0	7	0	0	0	0	0.00	—N/a
Source: Last Updated: 17 June 2024

== Tournament results ==
=== Oman & UAE 2021 ===
Squad and kit

- Assad Vala (c)
- Charles Amini
- Simon Atai (wk)
- Sese Bau
- Kiplin Doriga (wk)
- Jack Gardner
- Hiri Hiri
- Jason Kila
- Kabua Morea
- Nosaina Pokana
- Damien Ravu
- Lega Siaka
- Chad Soper
- Gaudi Toka
- Tony Ura
- Norman Vanua

2021 kit

Results

First round (Group B)				Super 12		Semifinal	Final	Overall Result
Opposition Result	Opposition Result	Opposition Result	Rank	Opposition Result	Rank	Opposition Result	Opposition Result	Overall Result
Oman; Lost by 10 wickets	Scotland; Lost by 17 runs	Bangladesh; Lost by 84 runs	4	Did not advance				First round
Source: Cricinfo

Scorecards

First round (Group B)

17 October 2021
14:00
Scorecard

Papua New Guinea; 129/9 (20 overs)	v	Oman; 131/0 (13.4 overs)
Assad Vala 56 (43); Zeeshan Maqsood 4/20 (4 overs)		Jatinder Singh 73* (42)

Oman won by 10 wickets
Oman Cricket Academy Ground Turf 1, Muscat
Umpires: Kumar Dharmasena (SL) and Chris Gaffaney (NZ)
Player of the match: Zeeshan Maqsood (Oma)

- Oman won the toss and elected to field.

19 October 2021
14:00
Scorecard

Scotland; 165/9 (20 overs)	v	Papua New Guinea; 148 (19.3 overs)
Richie Berrington 70 (49); Kabua Morea 4/31 (4 overs)		Norman Vanua 47 (37); Josh Davey 4/18 (3.3 overs)

Scotland won by 17 runs
Oman Cricket Academy Ground Turf 1, Muscat
Umpires: Kumar Dharmasena (SL) and Richard Kettleborough (Eng)
Player of the match: Richie Berrington (Sco)

- Scotland won the toss and elected to bat.

21 October 2021
14:00
Scorecard

Bangladesh; 181/7 (20 overs)	v	Papua New Guinea; 97 (19.3 overs)
Mahmudullah 50 (28); Assad Vala 2/26 (3 overs)		Kiplin Doriga 46* (34); Shakib Al Hasan 4/9 (4 overs)

Bangladesh won by 84 runs
Oman Cricket Academy Ground Turf 1, Muscat
Umpires: Kumar Dharmasena (SL) and Richard Kettleborough (Eng)
Player of the match: Shakib Al Hasan (Ban)

- Bangladesh won the toss and elected to bat.
- Papua New Guinea was eliminated as a result of this match.

=== United States & West Indies 2024 ===
Squad and kit

- Assad Vala (c)
- Charles Amini (vc)
- Sese Bau
- Kiplin Doriga (wk)
- Jack Gardner
- Hiri Hiri
- Semo Kamea
- John Kariko
- Kabua Morea
- Alei Nao
- Lega Siaka
- Chad Soper
- Tony Ura
- Norman Vanua
- Hila Vare (wk)

2024 kit

Results

Group stage (Group C)					Super 8		Semifinal	Final	Overall Result
Opposition Result	Opposition Result	Opposition Result	Opposition Result	Rank	Opposition Result	Rank	Opposition Result	Opposition Result	Overall Result
West Indies; Lost by 5 wickets	Uganda; Lost by 3 wickets	Afghanistan; Lost by 7 wickets	New Zealand; Lost by 7 wickets	5	Did not advance				Group stage
Source: Cricinfo

Scorecards

Group stage (Group C)

2 June 2024
10:30 UTC−4
Scorecard

Papua New Guinea; 136/8 (20 overs)	v	West Indies; 137/5 (19 overs)
Sese Bau 50 (43); Andre Russell 2/19 (3 overs)		Roston Chase 42* (27); Assad Vala 2/28 (4 overs)

West Indies won by 5 wickets
Providence Stadium, Guyana
Umpires: Adrian Holdstock (SA) and Rashid Riaz (Pak)
Player of the match: Roston Chase (WI)

- West Indies won the toss and elected to field.

5 June 2024
19:30 UTC−4 (N)
Scorecard

Papua New Guinea; 77 (19.1 overs)	v	Uganda; 78/7 (18.2 overs)
Hiri Hiri 15 (19); Frank Nsubuga 2/4 (4 overs)		Riazat Ali Shah 33 (56); Alei Nao 2/16 (4 overs)

Uganda won by 3 wickets
Providence Stadium, Guyana
Umpires: Adrian Holdstock (SA) and Rashid Riaz (Pak)
Player of the match: Riazat Ali Shah (Uga)

- Uganda won the toss and elected to field.

13 June 2024
20:30 UTC−4 (N)
Scorecard

Papua New Guinea; 95 (19.5 overs)	v	Afghanistan; 101/3 (15.1 overs)
Kiplin Doriga 27 (32); Fazalhaq Farooqi 3/16 (4 overs)		Gulbadin Naib 49* (36); Semo Kamea 1/16 (3 overs)

Afghanistan won by 7 wickets
Brian Lara Cricket Academy, San Fernando
Umpires: Michael Gough (Eng) and Alex Wharf (Eng)
Player of the match: Fazalhaq Farooqi (Afg)

- Afghanistan won the toss and elected to field.
- Papua New Guinea was eliminated as a result of this match.

17 June 2024
10:30 UTC−4
Scorecard

Papua New Guinea; 78 (19.4 overs)	v	New Zealand; 79/3 (12.2 overs)
Charles Amini 17 (25); Lockie Ferguson 3/0 (4 overs)		Devon Conway 35 (32); Kabua Morea 2/4 (2.2 overs)

New Zealand won by 7 wickets
Brian Lara Cricket Academy, San Fernando
Umpires: Paul Reiffel (Aus) and Langton Rusere (Zim)
Player of the match: Lockie Ferguson (NZ)

- New Zealand won the toss and elected to field.
