= 2022 Men's T20 World Cup Global Qualifier B =

Cricket tournament

2022 ICC Men's T20 World Cup Global Qualifier B
- Dates: 11 – 17 July 2022
- Administrator: ICC
- Cricket format: Twenty20 International
- Host: Zimbabwe
- Champions: Zimbabwe
- Runners-up: Netherlands
- Participants: 8
- Matches: 20
- Player of the series: (Zimbabwe) Sikandar Raza
- Most runs: (United States) Steven Taylor (233)
- Most wickets: (Netherlands) Logan van Beek (11)

The 2022 ICC Men's T20 World Cup Global Qualifier B was a cricket tournament that was played in July 2022 in Zimbabwe, as one of two global tournaments that together formed the final stage of the qualification process for the 2022 ICC Men's T20 World Cup. In April 2018, the International Cricket Council (ICC) granted full international status to Twenty20 men's matches played between member sides from 1 January 2019 onwards. Therefore, all the matches in the Global Qualifiers were played as Twenty20 Internationals (T20Is). Global Qualifier B was contested by eight teams that advanced from their Regional Finals, were eliminated in the first round of the 2021 ICC Men's T20 World Cup, or were one of the highest ranked sides not already qualified to this stage. The eight teams were placed in two groups, with two sides from each group advancing to the semi-finals. The two teams that reached the final of the Global Qualifier advanced to the 2022 ICC Men's T20 World Cup in Australia.

The United States and Jersey announced that they would play a series of practice games against each other and Namibia in Windhoek before travelling to Zimbabwe. In June 2022, the ICC confirmed the full schedule for the Global Qualifier B tournament.

In Group A, United States and Zimbabwe both won their first two matches to secure their places in the semi-finals of the tournament. The Netherlands won their first two matches in Group B to also qualify for the semi-finals. Despite losing their final group match, Papua New Guinea became the fourth and final team to qualify for the semi-finals, due to a superior net run rate over Hong Kong. The Netherlands and Zimbabwe reached the final of the tournament to qualify for the 2022 ICC Men's T20 World Cup. Hosts Zimbabwe beat the Netherlands by 37 runs in the final to win the tournament.

== Teams and qualifications ==
Sub-regional qualification stages were scheduled to begin on 24 June 2021 with the European qualifier in Finland. But a number of these regional tournaments were either postponed or cancelled owing to the COVID-19 pandemic. A total of 65 Associate Member teams participated in the regional qualification stage. The teams that advanced from this stage, joined Singapore and Zimbabwe, who had qualified via T20I rankings along with the Netherlands and Papua New Guinea who qualified via the 2021 Men's T20 World Cup.

Means of qualification	Date	Host	Berths	Qualified
Automatic qualifications
ICC Men's T20I Team Rankings	December 2020	—N/a	2	Singapore; Zimbabwe
2021 Men's T20 World Cup	14 November 2021	Oman; United Arab Emirates	2	Netherlands; Papua New Guinea
Regional qualifications
Europe	15 – 21 October 2021	Spain	1	Jersey
Asia	22–28 July 2019	Qatar	1	Hong Kong (Note: Hong Kong qualified for the global qualifier as the highest-ranked team in Group B of the Asia Qualifier, as the tournament was cancelled due to COVID-19.)
Americas	7 – 14 November 2021	Antigua and Barbuda	1	United States
Africa	17 – 20 November 2021	Rwanda	1	Uganda
Total			8	

== Squads ==
The following squads were named for the tournament.

Hong Kong	Jersey	Netherlands	Papua New Guinea
Nizakat Khan (c); Zeeshan Ali; Haroon Arshad; Mohammad Ghazanfar; Adit Gorawara; Babar Hayat; Aftab Hussain; Aizaz Khan; Ehsan Khan; Scott McKechnie (wk); Yasim Murtaza; Kinchit Shah; Ayush Shukla; Mohammad Waheed; Shahid Wasif	Charles Perchard (c); Daniel Birrell; Dominic Blampied; Harrison Carlyon; Jake Dunford (wk); Nick Greenwood; Jonty Jenner; Elliot Miles; Rhys Palmer; Ben Stevens; Julius Sumerauer; Asa Tribe; Zak Tribe; Benjamin Ward	Scott Edwards (c); Shariz Ahmad; Philippe Boissevain; Tom Cooper; Bas de Leede; Aryan Dutt; Brandon Glover; Fred Klaassen; Paul van Meekeren; Stephan Myburgh; Teja Nidamanuru; Max O'Dowd; Tim Pringle; Vikramjit Singh; Logan van Beek	Assad Vala (c); Charles Amini; Simon Atai; Sese Bau; Riley Hekure; Semo Kamea; Kabua Morea; Alei Nao; Damien Ravu; Lega Siaka; Chad Soper; Norman Vanua; Hila Vare; Tony Ura
Singapore	Uganda	United States	Zimbabwe
Amjad Mahboob (c); Vinoth Baskaran; Surendran Chandramohan; Aman Desai (wk); Rezza Gaznavi; Neil Karnik; Anantha Krishna; Arjun Mutreja; Navin Param; Janak Prakash; Akshay Puri; Rohan Rangarajan; Manpreet Singh (wk); Aryaman Sunil	Brian Masaba (c); Fred Achelam; Frank Akankwasa; Bilal Hassan; Cosmas Kyewuta; Juma Miyagi; Roger Mukasa; Dinesh Nakrani; Frank Nsubuga; Ronak Patel; Riazat Ali Shah; Henry Ssenyondo; Simon Ssesazi; Kenneth Waiswa	Monank Patel (c); Aaron Jones (vc); Marty Kain; Ali Khan; Siva Kumar; Jaskaran Malhotra; Sushant Modani; Yasir Mohammad; Saurabh Netravalkar; Nisarg Patel; Gajanand Singh; Cameron Stevenson; Steven Taylor; Rusty Theron; Vatsal Vaghela	Craig Ervine (c); Ryan Burl; Regis Chakabva; Tendai Chatara; Luke Jongwe; Innocent Kaia; Wesley Madhevere; Tadiwanashe Marumani; Wellington Masakadza; Tony Munyonga; Blessing Muzarabani; Richard Ngarava; Sikandar Raza; Milton Shumba; Sean Williams

Ali Khan suffered a fractured forearm during the USA's match against Jersey when Jersey batter Ben Ward drove a full delivery straight back to Khan. He retired hurt immediately and was ruled out of the rest of the tournament. Siva Kumar was later named as Khan's replacement. Zimbabwe's Tendai Chatara fractured his collarbone, also in a match against Jersey, with Tony Munyonga replacing him for the remaining matches of the tournament.

== Group stage ==
=== Group A ===
Pos	Team	Pld	W	L	NR	Pts	NRR
1	Zimbabwe	3	3	0	0	6	3.000
2	United States	3	2	1	0	4	1.779
3	Jersey	3	1	2	0	2	−0.484
4	Singapore	3	0	3	0	0	−4.267

Source: ESPN Cricinfo

Advanced to the Semi-Finals
Advanced to the Consolation play-offs

11 July 2022
09:30
Scorecard

Zimbabwe; 236/5 (20 overs)	v	Singapore; 125/7 (20 overs)
Sikandar Raza 87 (40); Anantha Krishna 1/31 (4 overs)		Janak Prakash 32* (33); Tendai Chatara 3/14 (4 overs)

Zimbabwe won by 111 runs
Queens Sports Club, Bulawayo
Umpires: Shaun George (SA) and Gazi Sohel (Ban)
Player of the match: Sikandar Raza (Zim)

- Singapore won the toss and elected to field.

11 July 2022
09:30
Scorecard

Jersey; 154/5 (20 overs)	v	United States; 159/2 (18.1 overs)
Asa Tribe 73* (45); Nisarg Patel 2/26 (4 overs)		Steven Taylor 101* (55); Dominic Blampied 2/20 (2.1 overs)

United States won by 8 wickets
Bulawayo Athletic Club, Bulawayo
Umpires: Iknow Chabi (Zim) and Langton Rusere (Zim)
Player of the match: Steven Taylor (USA)

- United States won the toss and elected to field.
- Steven Taylor became the first player for the United States to score a century in T20Is.

12 July 2022
09:30
Scorecard

Zimbabwe; 146/8 (20 overs)	v	Jersey; 123/5 (20 overs)
Sean Williams 57 (39); Elliot Miles 2/25 (4 overs)		Harrison Carlyon 45 (56); Ryan Burl 3/13 (4 overs)

Zimbabwe won by 23 runs
Queens Sports Club, Bulawayo
Umpires: Shaun George (SA) and Bongani Jele (SA)
Player of the match: Sean Williams (Zim)

- Jersey won the toss and elected to field.

12 July 2022
09:30
Scorecard

United States; 201/6 (20 overs)	v	Singapore; 69 (15.2 overs)
Steven Taylor 58 (31); Amjad Mahboob 3/54 (4 overs)		Anantha Krishna 21* (22); Saurabh Netravalkar 5/12 (4 overs)

United States won by 132 runs
Bulawayo Athletic Club, Bulawayo
Umpires: Forster Mutizwa (Zim) and Langton Rusere (Zim)
Player of the match: Saurabh Netravalkar (USA)

- Singapore won the toss and elected to field.
- Cameron Stevenson (USA) made his T20I debut.
- Saurabh Netravalkar became the first bowler for the United States to take a five-wicket haul in T20Is.

14 July 2022
13:30
Scorecard

Zimbabwe; 185/6 (20 overs)	v	United States; 139/8 (20 overs)
Sikandar Raza 82* (40); Nisarg Patel 2/24 (4 overs)		Steven Taylor 46 (32); Wellington Masakadza 4/11 (3 overs)

Zimbabwe won by 46 runs
Queens Sports Club, Bulawayo
Umpires: Bongani Jele (SA) and Gazi Sohel (Ban)
Player of the match: Sikandar Raza (Zim)

- Zimbabwe won the toss and elected to bat.

14 July 2022
13:30
Scorecard

Jersey; 154/7 (20 overs)	v	Singapore; 141/7 (20 overs)
Nick Greenwood 44 (22); Amjad Mahboob 2/27 (4 overs)		Manpreet Singh 59 (37); Harrison Carlyon 2/5 (2 overs)

Jersey won by 13 runs
Bulawayo Athletic Club, Bulawayo
Umpires: Iknow Chabi (Zim) and Forster Mutizwa (Zim)
Player of the match: Manpreet Singh (Sin)

- Jersey won the toss and elected to bat.

=== Group B ===
Pos	Team	Pld	W	L	NR	Pts	NRR
1	Netherlands	3	3	0	0	6	3.473
2	Papua New Guinea	3	1	2	0	2	−0.419
3	Hong Kong	3	1	2	0	2	−0.898
4	Uganda	3	1	2	0	2	−1.996

Source: ESPN Cricinfo

Advanced to the Semi-Finals
Advanced to the Consolation play-offs

11 July 2022
13:30
Scorecard

Netherlands; 163/7 (20 overs)	v	Papua New Guinea; 111 (19.4 overs)
Stephan Myburgh 39 (24); Semo Kamea 2/25 (4 overs)		Sese Bau 35 (34); Logan van Beek 3/17 (3.4 overs)

Netherlands won by 52 runs
Queens Sports Club, Bulawayo
Umpires: Bongani Jele (SA) and Gazi Sohel (Ban)
Player of the match: Bas de Leede (Ned)

- Netherlands won the toss and elected to bat.
- Shariz Ahmad, Teja Nidamanuru and Tim Pringle (Ned) all made their T20I debuts.

11 July 2022
13:30
Scorecard

Hong Kong; 87/9 (20 overs)	v	Uganda; 88/8 (19.3 overs)
Kinchit Shah 37 (46); Dinesh Nakrani 4/12 (4 overs)		Riazat Ali Shah 28* (41); Aizaz Khan 3/22 (4 overs)

Uganda won by 2 wickets
Bulawayo Athletic Club, Bulawayo
Umpires: Iknow Chabi (Zim) and Forster Mutizwa (Zim)
Player of the match: Dinesh Nakrani (Uga)

- Hong Kong won the toss and elected to bat.
- Zeeshan Ali, Yasim Murtaza and Ayush Shukla (HK) all made their T20I debuts.

12 July 2022
13:30
Scorecard

Hong Kong; 116 (18.1 overs)	v	Netherlands; 117/3 (13.2 overs)
Nizakat Khan 60 (55); Logan van Beek 4/27 (4 overs)		Max O'Dowd 45 (27); Ehsan Khan 2/18 (3.2 overs)

Netherlands won by 7 wickets
Queens Sports Club, Bulawayo
Umpires: Shaun George (SA) and Gazi Sohel (Ban)
Player of the match: Logan van Beek (Ned)

- Hong Kong won the toss and elected to bat.
- Logan van Beek became the first bowler for the Netherlands to take a hat-trick in T20Is.

12 July 2022
13:30
Scorecard

Uganda; 160/4 (20 overs)	v	Papua New Guinea; 161/2 (16.4 overs)
Simon Ssesazi 78 (48); Charles Amini 2/20 (3 overs)		Assad Vala 93* (47); Frank Nsubuga 2/16 (4 overs)

Papua New Guinea won by 8 wickets
Bulawayo Athletic Club, Bulawayo
Umpires: Iknow Chabi (Zim) and Langton Rusere (Zim)
Player of the match: Assad Vala (PNG)

- Papua New Guinea won the toss and elected to field.

14 July 2022
09:30
Scorecard

Netherlands; 187/3 (20 overs)	v	Uganda; 90/9 (20 overs)
Tom Cooper 81* (42); Frank Nsubuga 1/15 (3 overs)		Riazat Ali Shah 19 (26); Fred Klaassen 5/19 (4 overs)

Netherlands won by 97 runs
Queens Sports Club, Bulawayo
Umpires: Shaun George (SA) and Bongani Jele (SA)
Player of the match: Tom Cooper (Ned)

- Uganda won the toss and elected to field.
- Fred Klaassen (Ned) took his first five-wicket haul in T20Is.

14 July 2022
09:30
Scorecard

Papua New Guinea; 185/7 (20 overs)	v	Hong Kong; 186/8 (20 overs)
Tony Ura 83 (33); Ehsan Khan 3/20 (4 overs)		Babar Hayat 86 (45); Kabua Morea 3/34 (4 overs)

Hong Kong won by 2 wickets
Bulawayo Athletic Club, Bulawayo
Umpires: Forster Mutizwa (Zim) and Langton Rusere (Zim)
Player of the match: Babar Hayat (HK)

- Hong Kong won the toss and elected to field.

== Consolation play-offs ==
=== Bracket ===
Playoff Semi-Finals
A3	Jersey	105/9
B4	Uganda	110
B3	Hong Kong	147/3
A4	Singapore	146

5th-place play-off
B4	Uganda	102/7
B3	Hong Kong	98/8
7th-place play-off
A3	Jersey	141/4
A4	Singapore	140/7

=== 5th Place semi-finals ===
15 July 2022
09:30
Scorecard

Uganda; 110 (20 overs)	v	Jersey; 105/9 (20 overs)
Simon Ssesazi 30 (25); Benjamin Ward 3/16 (4 overs)		Jonty Jenner 27* (31); Juma Miyagi 2/17 (4 overs)

Uganda won by 5 runs
Queens Sports Club, Bulawayo
Umpires: Shaun George (SA) and Gazi Sohel (Ban)
Player of the match: Benjamin Ward (Jer)

- Uganda won the toss and elected to bat.

15 July 2022
09:30
Scorecard

Singapore; 146 (20 overs)	v	Hong Kong; 147/3 (18.5 overs)
Navin Param 33 (24); Yasim Murtaza 3/19 (4 overs)		Nizakat Khan 81 (55); Akshay Puri 1/21 (4 overs)

Hong Kong won by 7 wickets
Bulawayo Athletic Club, Bulawayo
Umpires: Forster Mutizwa (Zim) and Langton Rusere (Zim)
Player of the match: Nizakat Khan (HK)

- Hong Kong won the toss and elected to field.

=== 7th-place play-off ===
17 July 2022
09:00
Scorecard

Singapore; 140/7 (20 overs)	v	Jersey; 141/4 (15.4 overs)
Manpreet Singh 47 (37); Benjamin Ward 2/17 (4 overs)		Nick Greenwood 48 (26); Vinoth Baskaran 2/20 (4 overs)

Jersey won by 6 wickets
Bulawayo Athletic Club, Bulawayo
Umpires: Iknow Chabi (Zim) and Forster Mutizwa (Zim)
Player of the match: Nick Greenwood (Jer)

- Singapore won the toss and elected to bat.

=== 5th-place play-off ===
17 July 2022
09:00
Scorecard

Uganda; 102/7 (20 overs)	v	Hong Kong; 98/8 (20 overs)
Simon Ssesazi 23 (29); Mohammad Ghazanfar 3/22 (4 overs)		Zeeshan Ali 26 (39); Juma Miyagi 2/13 (4 overs)

Uganda won by 4 runs
Queens Sports Club, Bulawayo
Umpires: Shaun George (SA) and Bongani Jele (SA)
Player of the match: Juma Miyagi (Uga)

- Hong Kong won the toss and elected to field.

== Play-offs ==
=== Bracket ===
Semi-finals
A1	Zimbabwe	199/5
B2	Papua New Guinea	172/8
B1	Netherlands	139/3
A2	United States	138

Final
A1	Zimbabwe	132
B1	Netherlands	95
3rd-place play-off
B2	Papua New Guinea	97
A2	United States	92

=== Semi-finals ===
15 July 2022
13:30
Scorecard

Zimbabwe; 199/5 (20 overs)	v	Papua New Guinea; 172/8 (20 overs)
Wesley Madhevere 42 (29); Charles Amini 2/28 (3 overs)		Tony Ura 66 (35); Blessing Muzarabani 2/24 (4 overs)

Zimbabwe won by 27 runs
Queens Sports Club, Bulawayo
Umpires: Shaun George (SA) and Bongani Jele (SA)
Player of the match: Tony Ura (PNG)

- Zimbabwe won the toss and elected to bat.

15 July 2022
13:30
Scorecard

United States; 138 (19.4 overs)	v	Netherlands; 139/3 (19 overs)
Monank Patel 32 (15); Paul van Meekeren 2/22 (4 overs)		Bas de Leede 91* (67); Cameron Stevenson 1/23 (4 overs)

Netherlands won by 7 wickets
Bulawayo Athletic Club, Bulawayo
Umpires: Iknow Chabi (Zim) and Langton Rusere (Zim)
Player of the match: Bas de Leede (Ned)

- United States won the toss and elected to bat.
- Siva Kumar (USA) made his T20I debut.

=== 3rd-place play-off ===
17 July 2022
13:30
Scorecard

Papua New Guinea; 97 (16.3 overs)	v	United States; 92 (19.1 overs)
Lega Siaka 28 (15); Rusty Theron 2/10 (2 overs)		Vatsal Vaghela 29 (32); Chad Soper 3/11 (3.1 overs)

Papua New Guinea won by 5 runs
Bulawayo Athletic Club, Bulawayo
Umpires: Iknow Chabi (Zim) and Langton Rusere (Zim)
Player of the match: Chad Soper (PNG)

- United States won the toss and elected to field.

=== Final ===
17 July 2022
13:30
Scorecard

Zimbabwe; 132 (19.3 overs)	v	Netherlands; 95 (18.2 overs)
Sean Williams 28 (25); Logan van Beek 3/18 (4 overs)		Stephan Myburgh 22 (24); Sikandar Raza 4/8 (4 overs)

Zimbabwe won by 37 runs
Queens Sports Club, Bulawayo
Umpires: Bongani Jele (SA) and Gazi Sohel (Ban)
Player of the match: Sikandar Raza (Zim)

- Zimbabwe won the toss and elected to bat.

== Final standings ==
These were the final standings following the conclusion of the tournament.

Position	Team
1st	Zimbabwe
2nd	Netherlands
3rd	Papua New Guinea
4th	United States
5th	Uganda
6th	Hong Kong
7th	Jersey
8th	Singapore

Qualified for the 2022 ICC Men's T20 World Cup.

== See also ==
- 2022 ICC Men's T20 World Cup Global Qualifier A
