= Irish cricket team against Papua New Guinea in Australia in 2015–16 =

International cricket tour

	Ireland	Papua New Guinea
- Dates: 24 January – 9 February 2016
Captains	William Porterfield	Jack Vare

Twenty20 International series
- Results: Ireland won the 3-match series 2–1
Most runs	Gary Wilson (73)	Charles Amini (47); Sese Bau (47)
Most wickets	George Dockrell (6)	Norman Vanua (4)

The Irish cricket team toured Australia to play Papua New Guinea from 24 January to 9 February 2016. The tour consisted of a first-class match, three Twenty20 Internationals (T20Is) and a tour match. The first-class match was part of the 2015–17 ICC Intercontinental Cup and the tour match was in preparation of the Intercontinental Cup match. Ireland won the T20I series 2–1.

== Squads ==
Ireland	Papua New Guinea
William Porterfield (c); Andrew Balbirnie; George Dockrell; Tim Murtagh; Andrew McBrine; Kevin O'Brien; Niall O'Brien; Andrew Poynter; Stuart Poynter; Boyd Rankin; Max Sorensen; Paul Stirling; Stuart Thompson; Gary Wilson; Craig Young	Jack Vare (c); Charles Amini; Sese Bau; Mahuru Dai; Hiri Hiri; Vani Morea; Alei Nao; Loa Nou; Nosaina Pokana; Pipi Raho; John Reva; Lega Siaka; Chad Soper; Assad Vala; Norman Vanua

== Tour match ==
=== Two-day match: Queensland XI vs. Ireland ===
24 – 25 January 2016
Scorecard

Ireland	v	Queensland
155 (51.1 overs); Ed Joyce 35 (60); James Bazley 2/11 (6 overs)		240/9d (65.2 overs); Simon Milenko 62 (94); Paul Stirling 3/55 (19 overs)
82/6 (27.1 overs); William Porterfield 27 (48); Cameron Gannon 2/4 (4 overs)

Match drawn
Brisbane Grammar School Oval, Brisbane
Umpires: Steven Farrell (Aus) and Jayvan Ruddick-Collins (Aus)

- Ireland won the toss and elected to bat.

== T20I series ==
=== 1st T20I ===
6 February 2016
Scorecard

Papua New Guinea; 92/9 (20 overs)	v	Ireland; 97/5 (12.1 overs)
Sese Bau 22 (21); Kevin O'Brien 2/10 (4 overs)		Gary Wilson 45 (33); Norman Vanua 3/26 (4 overs)

Ireland won by 5 wickets
Tony Ireland Stadium, Townsville
Umpires: Buddhi Pradhan (Nep) and Rod Tucker (Aus)

- Ireland won the toss and elected to field.
- Sese Bau, Hiri Hiri and Nosaina Pokana (Papua New Guinea) all made their T20I debuts.

=== 2nd T20I ===
7 February 2016
Scorecard

Ireland; 96/5 (11 overs)	v	Papua New Guinea; 89/9 (11 overs)
Stuart Poynter 35 (24); Pipi Raho 3/11 (2 overs)		Norman Vanua 26* (15); George Dockrell 3/18 (3 overs)

Ireland won by 7 runs (DLS method)
Tony Ireland Stadium, Townsville
Umpires: Buddhi Pradhan (Nep) and Rod Tucker (Aus)

- Papua New Guinea won the toss and elected to field.
- Rain reduced the match to 11 overs per side.
- Pipi Raho (Papua New Guinea) made his T20I debut.

=== 3rd T20I ===
9 February 2016
Scorecard

Papua New Guinea; 116/8 (20 overs)	v	Ireland; 105 (19.1 overs)
Sese Bau 25 (22); Tim Murtagh 3/23 (4 overs)		Niall O'Brien 27 (32); Chad Soper 3/13 (3.1 overs)

Papua New Guinea won by 11 runs
Tony Ireland Stadium, Townsville
Umpires: Buddhi Pradhan (Nep) and Rod Tucker (Aus)

- Papua New Guinea won the toss and elected to bat.
