= 2014 EAP Twenty20 Championship =

2014 ICC East Asia-Pacific Men's Championship
- Administrator: EAP
- Cricket format: Twenty20
- Tournament format: Group Stage with Finals
- Host: Australia
- Champions: Papua New Guinea
- Participants: 8
- Matches: 28
- Player of the series: (Papua New Guinea) Lega Siaka (Fiji) Riyad Khan
- Most runs: (Papua New Guinea) Tony Ura (304)
- Most wickets: (Fiji) Riyad Khan (19)
- Official website: ICC East Asia Pacific

The 2014 ICC East Asia-Pacific Men's Championship was a Twenty20 cricket competition held from 19 to 23 November 2014 in Lismore, Australia. Papua New Guinea emerged as the winner of the tournament and qualified for the 2015 ICC World Twenty20 Qualifier.

== Teams ==
Teams that had qualified for the championship were as follows:

- Cook Islands
- Fiji
- Indonesia
- Japan
- Philippines
- Papua New Guinea
- Samoa
- Vanuatu

== Fixtures ==
=== Group stage ===
==== Points table ====
Pos	Team	Pld	W	L	T	NR	Pts	NRR
1	Papua New Guinea	7	7	0	0	0	14	6.141
2	Vanuatu	7	6	1	0	0	12	2.643
3	Fiji	7	5	2	0	0	10	2.824
4	Samoa	7	4	3	0	0	8	−0.357
5	Philippines	7	3	4	0	0	6	−1.734
6	Japan	7	2	5	0	0	4	−1.665
7	Indonesia	7	1	6	0	0	2	−4.624
8	Cook Islands	7	0	7	0	0	0	−3.521

Source: cricHQ

Qualified for the 2015 ICC World Twenty20 Qualifier.

== Statistics ==
=== Most Runs ===
The top five run scorers (total runs) are included in this table.

Player	Team	Runs	Inns	Avg	S/R	HS	100s	50s
Tony Ura	Papua New Guinea	304	7	50.67	174.7	127*	1	1
Lega Siaka	Papua New Guinea	256	7	36.57	191.0	88	0	2
Maciu Gauna	Samoa	192	7	64.00	131.5	40*	0	0
Ben Mailata	Samoa	192	7	27.43	140.1	89	0	1
Assad Vala	Papua New Guinea	186	7	31.00	134.78	70	0	1

=== Most Wickets ===
The top five wicket takers (total wickets) are listed in this table.

Player	Team	Wkts	Mts	Ave	S/R	Econ	BBI
Riyad Khan	Fiji	19	7	5.74	8.84	3.89	4/8
Chula Rodrigo	Japan	10	7	14.40	12.60	6.86	4/21
Willie Gavera	Papua New Guinea	10	5	8.50	10.20	5.00	6/10
Mohammed Imran Khan	Fiji	9	6	12.22	13.11	5.59	3/17
Simpson Obed	Vanuatu	9	7	9.77	7.78	4.62	3/5

== See also ==
- 2015 ICC World Twenty20 Qualifier
- ICC EAP Cricket Trophy
- Tournament results at CricHq
