= 2015–2017 ICC Intercontinental Cup =

International cricket tournament

- Dates: 10 May 2015 – 2 December 2017
- Administrator: International Cricket Council
- Cricket format: First-class cricket
- Tournament format: Round-robin
- Host(s): Various (home and away)
- Champions: Afghanistan (2nd title)
- Participants: 8
- Matches: 28
- Most runs: (Hong Kong) Babar Hayat (712)
- Most wickets: (United Arab Emirates) Ahmed Raza (32)

The 2015–2017 ICC Intercontinental Cup was the seventh edition of the ICC Intercontinental Cup, an international first-class cricket tournament comprising leading associate members of the International Cricket Council (ICC). The tournament took place from May 2015 to December 2017. It ran in parallel with the 2015–17 ICC World Cricket League Championship, but with slightly different teams. As Ireland and Afghanistan had qualified for the ICC One Day International Championship ranking qualification process, they were replaced by Kenya and Nepal in the limited over event; however they continued to play the four-day event.

As a result of changes to the structure of international cricket announced by the ICC in January 2014, the winner of the 2015-17 Intercontinental Cup (and following editions of the tournament) were originally scheduled to play four five-day matches against the bottom ranked Test nation (two home and two away matches), an event known as the 2018 ICC Test Challenge. Should the winner of the Intercontinental Cup go on to win the ICC Test Challenge, they would have become the 11th Test nation.

However, in February 2017 following an ICC Board meeting, changes were agreed in principle to expand the number of Test nations to twelve. Both Afghanistan and Ireland were likely to be granted Test status before the proposed 2018 ICC Test Challenge. In June 2017, the ICC awarded both Afghanistan and Ireland Full Member status, making them eligible to play Test match cricket. As a result, the planned Test Challenge was scrapped.

Afghanistan won the competition, after beating the United Arab Emirates by 10 wickets in their final game. They finished with 121 points, with Ireland as runners-up on 109 points. Rashid Khan, man of the match for Afghanistan in the final fixture, said that winning the Intercontinental Cup was "good preparation for Test cricket for us".

== Teams ==
The following were the 8 teams that participated in the competition based on the results from the 2011–13 ICC World Cricket League Championship, 2014 Cricket World Cup Qualifier and the 2015 ICC World Cricket League Division Two.

- Ireland (1st in 2011–13 ICC World Cricket League Championship)
- Afghanistan (2nd in 2011–13 ICC World Cricket League Championship)
- Scotland (1st in 2014 Cricket World Cup Qualifier)
- United Arab Emirates (2nd in 2014 Cricket World Cup Qualifier)
- Hong Kong (3rd in 2014 Cricket World Cup Qualifier)
- Papua New Guinea (4th in 2014 Cricket World Cup Qualifier)
- Netherlands (1st in 2015 ICC World Cricket League Division Two)
- Namibia (2nd in 2015 ICC World Cricket League Division Two)

== Preparations ==
Of the eight teams participating in the 2015–17 ICC Intercontinental Cup, only Papua New Guinea had never played a first-class match before. Afghanistan, Ireland, Namibia, Scotland, the Netherlands and the UAE had all appeared before in the previous Intercontinental Cup of 2011–2013, while Hong Kong had last appeared in the 2005 Intercontinental Cup and last played in an international multi-day cricket tournament in late 2006 at the 2006/07 ACC Fast Track Countries Tournament.

Though never having played a first-class match, Papua New Guinea (PNG) had played two-day cricket in the South Australian Premier League in 2013 and 2014. Though finishing at the bottom of the league in both seasons, the experience seemed to have hardened the team as they convincingly beat Hong Kong in a three-day match in Australia and one of PNG's openers admitted that participation in the league had been critical to exposing the players to multi-day cricket.

11–13 November 2014
Scorecard

Papua New Guinea	v	Hong Kong
469/7d (104 overs); Assad Vala 98 (117); Nadeem Ahmed 4/114 (28 overs)		205 (67.5 overs); Anshuman Rath 72 (112); Charles Amini 3/34 (14 overs)
114/8d (23 overs); Assad Vala 40* (13); Haseeb Amjad 3/35 (10 overs)		245 (71.5 overs); Jamie Atkinson 63 (87); Norman Vanua 5/36 (15.5 overs)

Papua New Guinea won by 133 runs
Tony Ireland Stadium, Townsville
Umpires: Alu Kapa (PNG) and Nigel Morrison (Van)

- Papua New Guinea won the toss and elected to bat.

== Fixtures ==
The breakdown of fixtures is as follows:

Round	Window	Home team	Away team	Result
1	May – June 2015	Namibia	Hong Kong	Namibia by 114 runs
1	May – June 2015	Ireland	United Arab Emirates	Ireland by an innings and 26 runs
1	May – June 2015	Scotland	Afghanistan	Match drawn
1	May – June 2015	Netherlands	Papua New Guinea	Papua New Guinea by 5 wickets
2	September – November 2015	Netherlands	Scotland	Netherlands by 44 runs
2	September – November 2015	Namibia	Ireland	Ireland by an innings and 107 runs
2	September – November 2015	United Arab Emirates	Hong Kong	Hong Kong by 276 runs
2	September – November 2015	Afghanistan	Papua New Guinea	Afghanistan by 201 runs
3	January – April 2016	Hong Kong	Scotland	No result
3	January – April 2016	United Arab Emirates	Netherlands	Netherlands by 4 wickets
3	January – April 2016	Papua New Guinea	Ireland	Ireland by 145 runs
3	January – April 2016	Afghanistan	Namibia	Afghanistan by an innings and 36 runs
4	July – October 2016	Netherlands	Afghanistan	Afghanistan by an innings and 36 runs
4	July – October 2016	Scotland	United Arab Emirates	Match drawn
4	July – October 2016	Ireland	Hong Kong	Ireland by 70 runs
4	July – October 2016	Papua New Guinea	Namibia	Papua New Guinea by 199 runs
5	February – June 2017	Hong Kong	Netherlands	Match drawn
5	February – June 2017	Afghanistan	Ireland	Afghanistan by an innings and 172 runs
5	February – June 2017	United Arab Emirates	Papua New Guinea	United Arab Emirates by 9 wickets
5	February – June 2017	Scotland	Namibia	Match drawn
6	August – October 2017	Ireland	Netherlands	Match drawn
6	August – October 2017	Namibia	United Arab Emirates	United Arab Emirates by 34 runs
6	August – October 2017	Papua New Guinea	Scotland	Match drawn
6	August – October 2017	Hong Kong	Afghanistan	Afghanistan by an innings and 173 runs
7 Simultaneous Round	November – December 2017	Afghanistan	United Arab Emirates	Afghanistan by 10 wickets
7 Simultaneous Round	November – December 2017	Ireland	Scotland	Ireland by 203 runs
7 Simultaneous Round	November – December 2017	Hong Kong	Papua New Guinea	Hong Kong by an innings and 29 runs
7 Simultaneous Round	November – December 2017	Namibia	Netherlands	Netherlands by 231 runs

== Points table ==
Pos	Team	Pld	W	L	T	D	A	FI	Pts	NRR
1	Afghanistan	7	6	0	0	1	0	5	121	2.187
2	Ireland	7	5	1	0	1	0	6	109	1.369
3	Netherlands	7	3	2	0	2	0	4	72	0.958
4	Hong Kong	7	2	3	0	1	1	3	59	0.915
5	United Arab Emirates	7	2	4	0	1	0	2	47	0.816
6	Scotland	7	0	2	0	4	1	2	46	0.840
7	Papua New Guinea	7	2	4	0	1	0	1	43	0.806
8	Namibia	7	1	5	0	1	0	1	27	0.672

- Win – 14 points
- Tie – 7 points
- Draw (if more than 10 hours of play lost) – 7 points (otherwise 3 points)
- Abandoned without a ball bowled – 10 points
- First Innings lead (independent of final result) – 6 points (3 points each in case of a first innings tie)

== Matches ==
=== Round 1 ===
The fixtures for round one were announced on 5 May 2015.

10–13 May 2015
Scorecard

Namibia	v	Hong Kong
272 (102.3 overs); Nicolaas Scholtz 85 (180); Haseeb Amjad 5/49 (23 overs)		203 (82.3 overs); Nizakat Khan 58 (158); JJ Smit 4/57 (15 overs)
234/5d (89 overs); Xander Pitchers 107* (269); Irfan Ahmed 2/29 (8 overs)		187 (75.2 overs); Skhawat Ali 43 (75); Bernard Scholtz 3/53 (24 overs)

Namibia won by 114 runs
Wanderers Cricket Ground, Windhoek
Umpires: Adrian Holdstock (SA) and Wynand Louw (Nam)
Player of the match: Xander Pitchers (Nam)

- Namibia won the toss and elected to bat.
- Babar Hayat, Ehsan Nawaz, Haseeb Amjad, Roy Lamsam, Nizakat Khan, Skhawat Ali, Tanwir Afzal and Waqas Barkat (all Hong Kong) made their first-class debuts.

2–5 June 2015
Scorecard

Ireland	v	United Arab Emirates
492 (118.3 overs); Ed Joyce 231 (232); Amjad Javed 4/117 (24.3 overs)		213 (71.3 overs); Shaiman Anwar 57 (90); John Mooney 3/36 (12 overs)
		253 (100.4 overs) (f/o); Swapnil Patil 63 (110); George Dockrell 4/93 (34 overs)

Ireland won by an innings and 26 runs
Malahide Cricket Club Ground, Malahide
Umpires: Mark Hawthorne (Ire) and Chettithody Shamshuddin (Ind)
Player of the match: Ed Joyce (Ire)

- United Arab Emirates won the toss and elected to field.
- The start on day 1 was delayed by rain.
- Ed Joyce's score of 231 is the highest by an Ireland player in multi-day cricket and was the first double century scored by an Irish player on home soil.

2–5 June 2015
Scorecard

Scotland	v	Afghanistan
233 (72.2 overs); Preston Mommsen 77 (126); Samiullah Shinwari 3/23 (13 overs)		135 (61.4 overs); Samiullah Shinwari 51* (152); Con de Lange 3/21 (14 overs)

Match drawn
New Williamfield, Stirling
Umpires: Gregory Brathwaite (WI) and Allan Haggo (Sco)
Player of the match: Samiullah Shinwari (Afg)

- Afghanistan won the toss and elected to field.
- No play was possible on day 1 due to rain. A wet outfield delayed the start of day 2 until 2pm. Rain delayed the start of day 3 until 2:50pm. Rain delayed the start of day 4 until after tea.
- Andrew Umeed (Sco) made his first-class debut.

16–19 June 2015
Scorecard

Netherlands	v	Papua New Guinea
209 (64.4 overs); Paul van Meekeren 34 (66); Loa Nou 5/55 (18 overs)		128 (48.4 overs); Mahuru Dai 26 (47); Timm van der Gugten 6/29 (17 overs)
223 (60.3 overs); Timm van der Gugten 57 (96); John Reva 4/42 (15.3 overs)		305/5 (76.3 overs); Assad Vala 124* (199); Paul van Meekeren 3/44 (20 overs)

Papua New Guinea won by 5 wickets
VRA Cricket Ground, Amstelveen
Umpires: Gregory Brathwaite (WI) and Sarika Prasad (Sin)
Player of the match: Assad Vala (PNG)

- Papua New Guinea won the toss and elected to field.
- Max O'Dowd (Ned), Charles Amini, Mahuru Dai, Willie Gavera, Vani Morea, Loa Nou, John Reva, Lega Siaka, Tony Ura, Assad Vala, Norman Vanua and Jack Vare (all PNG) made their first-class debuts.
- This was Papua New Guinea's maiden first-class match.

=== Round 2 ===
The fixtures for round two were announced in August 2015.

8–11 September 2015
Scorecard

Netherlands	v	Scotland
210 (71.1 overs); Roelof van der Merwe 73 (136); Josh Davey 3/36 (16 overs)		133 (53.3 overs); Robert Taylor 46 (75); Vivian Kingma 4/36 (16 overs)
123 (43 overs); Michael Rippon 37 (49); Josh Davey 3/43 (14 overs)		156 (64.2 overs); Richie Berrington 59 (143); Peter Borren 4/1 (3.2 overs)

Netherlands won by 44 runs
Sportpark Westvliet, The Hague
Umpires: Peter Nero (WI) and Chettithody Shamshuddin (Ind)

- Scotland won the toss and elected to field.
- No play was possible on day 1 due to a wet outfield.
- Rahil Ahmed and Ben Cooper (both Ned) made their first-class debuts.

24–27 October 2015
Scorecard

Namibia	v	Ireland
251 (97.1 overs); JP Kotze 78 (152); Tim Murtagh 2/44 (19 overs)		570/6d (128 overs); Ed Joyce 205 (201); Sarel Burger 2/73 (25 overs)
212 (78.5 overs); JP Kotze 48 (104); Tim Murtagh 4/18 (13 overs)

Ireland won by an innings and 107 runs
Wanderers Cricket Ground, Windhoek
Umpires: Adrian Holdstock (SA) and Wynand Louw (Nam)
Player of the match: Ed Joyce (Ire)

- Namibia won the toss and elected to bat.

11–14 November 2015
Scorecard

Hong Kong	v	United Arab Emirates
378 (125.2 overs); Babar Hayat 113 (235); Asif Iqbal 3/38 (14 overs)		181 (92.3 overs); Swapnil Patil 75 (160); Anshuman Rath 4/34 (15 overs)
184 (51.4 overs); Babar Hayat 73 (130); Ahmed Raza 5/61 (22 overs)		105 (29.2 overs); Laxman Sreekumar 61 (78); Haseeb Amjad 4/10 (6.2 overs)

Hong Kong won by 276 runs
ICC Academy Ground, Dubai
Umpires: Vineet Kulkarni (Ind) and Sarika Prasad (Sin)
Player of the match: Babar Hayat (Hong Kong)

- Hong Kong won the toss and elected to bat.
- Aizaz Khan, Anshuman Rath, Christopher Carter, Kinchit Shah (Hong Kong); Yodhin Punja, Qais Farooq, Raja Adeel and Laxman Sreekumar (United Arab Emirates) all made their first-class debuts.

21–24 November 2015
Scorecard

Afghanistan	v	Papua New Guinea
144 (39.4 overs); Mohammad Shahzad 29 (39); Norman Vanua 4/36 (7 overs)		295 (73.2 overs); Mahuru Dai 129 (139); Zahir Khan 3/44 (11.2 overs)
540 (127.2 overs); Asghar Stanikzai 127 (163); Sese Bau 2/50 (16 overs)		188 (61.5 overs); Assad Vala 81 (151); Yamin Ahmadzai 4/41 (12.4 overs)

Afghanistan won by 201 runs
Sharjah Cricket Stadium, Sharjah
Umpires: Buddhi Pradhan (Nep) and Raveendra Wimalasiri (SL)
Player of the match: Asghar Stanikzai (Afg)

- Afghanistan won the toss and elected to bat.
- Zahir Khan (Afg), Sese Bau and Chad Soper (PNG) all made their first-class debuts.

=== Round 3 ===
The fixtures for round three were announced in December 2015.

21–24 January 2016
Scorecard

Hong Kong	v	Scotland

Match abandoned
Mission Road Ground, Mong Kok
Umpires: Vineet Kulkarni (Ind) and Buddhi Pradhan (Nep)

- No toss.
- No play was possible due to a wet outfield and waterlogged ground with the match abandoned without a ball bowled.

21–24 January 2016
Scorecard

United Arab Emirates	v	Netherlands
164 (51.4 overs); Swapnil Patil 41 (68); Michael Rippon 4/45 (13.4 overs)		315 (97.1 overs); Peter Borren 96 (144); Farhan Ahmed 5/78 (27.1 overs)
276 (104.5 overs); Shaiman Anwar 148 (266); Ahsan Malik 3/55 (27.5 overs)		128/6 (42.5 overs); Max O'Dowd 36 (67); Zaheer Maqsood 3/26 (9 overs)

Netherlands won by 4 wickets
Sheikh Zayed Cricket Stadium, Abu Dhabi
Umpires: C. K. Nandan (Ind) and Sarika Prasad (Sin)

- United Arab Emirates won the toss and elected to bat.
- Farhan Ahmed, Mohammad Shahzad, Muhammad Usman, Muhammad Kaleem, Qadeer Ahmed and Saqlain Haider (United Arab Emirates) all made their first-class debuts.
- This was the first away win for the Netherlands in the Intercontinental Cup since they beat the UAE in January 2008.

31 January–3 February 2016
Scorecard

Ireland	v	Papua New Guinea
289 (104.4 overs); Niall O'Brien 63 (168); Norman Vanua 5/59 (18.4 overs)		188 (84.3 overs); Assad Vala 120 (231); Tim Murtagh 4/33 (18.3 overs)
244/5d (64 overs); Kevin O'Brien 75* (95); Loa Nou 2/37 (8 overs)		200 (73.4 overs); Sese Bau 45 (114); Boyd Rankin 3/31 (15 overs)

Ireland won by 145 runs
Tony Ireland Stadium, Townsville
Umpires: Vineet Kulkarni (Ind) and Buddhi Pradhan (Nep)

- Papua New Guinea won the toss and elected to field.
- 21 overs were lost on day 1 due to bad light and rain.
- Niall O'Brien (Ire) took his 50th dismissal in Intercontinental Cup matches.

10–13 April 2016
Scorecard

Namibia	v	Afghanistan
172 (62.1 overs); Pikky Ya France 46 (123); Mohammad Nabi 5/25 (20.1 overs)		334 (118.5 overs); Mohammad Shahzad 139 (245); Gerrie Snyman 4/78 (36 overs)
126 (35.3 overs); Pikky Ya France 40 (91); Zahir Khan 5/31 (8 overs)

Afghanistan won by an innings and 36 runs
Greater Noida Sports Complex Ground, Greater Noida
Umpires: Ahmed Shah Pakteen (Afg) and Sharfuddoula (Ban)
Player of the match: Mohammad Shahzad (Afg)

- Namibia won the toss and elected to bat.

=== Round 4 ===
The fixtures for round four were announced in April 2016.

29 July–1 August 2016
Scorecard

Netherlands	v	Afghanistan
117 (39.4 overs); Pieter Seelaar 38* (75); Yamin Ahmadzai 5/29 (10.4 overs)		312 (102.2 overs); Hashmatullah Shahidi 83 (184); Michael Rippon 5/79 (24.2 overs)
159 (43.1 overs); Michael Rippon 80 (125); Zahir Khan 4/29 (10.1 overs)

Afghanistan won by an innings and 36 runs
Sportpark Westvliet, Voorburg
Umpires: Anil Chaudhary (Ind) and Pim van Liemt (Ned)

- Afghanistan won the toss and elected to field.
- Shane Snater (Ned) and Ihsanullah (Afg) both made their first-class debuts.
- Dawlat Zadran (Afg) took career-best match figures of 7/77.

9–12 August 2016
Scorecard

United Arab Emirates	v	Scotland
212/5 (66 overs); Shaiman Anwar 78 (129); Josh Davey 2/37 (16 overs)

Match drawn
Cambusdoon New Ground, Ayr
Umpires: Alex Dowdalls (Sco) and Mark Hawthorne (Ire)

- Scotland won the toss and elected to field.
- Play was delayed on day 1 until 3pm due to a wet outfield.
- On day 2 only seven overs of play were possible with play being abandoned for the day due to rain.
- No play was possible on day 3 and day 4 due to rain.
- Mark Watt and Chris Sole (Sco); Mohammed Qasim (UAE) all made their first-class debuts.

30 August–2 September 2016
Scorecard

Ireland	v	Hong Kong
316 (86.1 overs); Gary Wilson 95 (141); Tanwir Afzal 4/63 (18.1 overs)		237 (101.4 overs); Anshuman Rath 73* (163); George Dockrell 3/46 (27.4 overs)
230 (55.3 overs); John Anderson 59 (112); Tanwir Afzal 3/53 (16 overs)		239 (80.2 overs); Nizakat Khan 123 (181); Tim Murtagh 3/29 (12 overs)

Ireland won by 70 runs
Stormont, Belfast
Umpires: Gregory Brathwaite (WI) and Mark Hawthorne (Ire)

- Ireland won the toss and elected to bat.
- Ehsan Khan, Ninad Shah, Tanveer Ahmed, Waqas Khan (HK) all made their first-class debuts.
- Nizakat Khan (HK) scored his maiden first-class century.

16–19 October 2016
Scorecard

Papua New Guinea	v	Namibia
311 (98.5 overs); Assad Vala 144* (216); Bernard Scholtz 5/105 (31 overs)		146 (55.2 overs); Sarel Burger 52* (130); Lega Siaka 3/16 (8.2 overs)
189 (57 overs); Vani Morea 61 (86); Bernard Scholtz 6/65 (19 overs)		155 (61.1 overs); JP Kotze 36 (86); Lega Siaka 4/38 (12.1 overs)

Papua New Guinea won by 199 runs
Amini Park, Port Moresby
Umpires: Chris Brown (NZ) and Lakani Oala (PNG)

- Papua New Guinea won the toss and elected to bat.
- Dogodo Bau (Papua New Guinea) made his first-class debut.
- This was Papua New Guinea's first Intercontinental Cup match played at home.

=== Round 5 ===
The fixture between Afghanistan and Ireland was announced by Cricket Ireland in July 2016. The fixture between Hong Kong and the Netherlands was announced by the Koninklijke Nederlandse Cricket Bond in December 2016. Cricket Scotland confirmed the venue for their fixture in February 2017.

10–13 February 2017
Scorecard

Hong Kong	v	Netherlands
527/9d (142.2 overs); Babar Hayat 173 (265); Vivian Kingma 4/125 (35 overs)		284 (65.2 overs); Roelof van der Merwe 135 (149); Ehsan Nawaz 2/8 (6 overs)
263/6d (53 overs); Anshuman Rath 88 (77); Vivian Kingma 1/38 (9 overs)		395/5 (111 overs); Ben Cooper 173* (317); Ehsan Nawaz 3/85 (22 overs)

Match drawn
Mission Road Ground, Mong Kok
Umpires: Buddhi Pradhan (Nep) and Tabarak Dar (HK)
Player of the match: Ben Cooper (Ned)

- Netherlands won the toss and elected to field.
- Matt Stiller (HK) and Sikander Zulfiqar (Ned) both made their first-class debuts.
- Ben Cooper and Pieter Seelaar set a Dutch record for the highest partnership for any wicket in a first-class match (288).
- It was also the highest sixth-wicket partnership in the history of the Intercontinental Cup.

28–31 March 2017
Scorecard

Afghanistan	v	Ireland
537/8d (138.5 overs); Asghar Stanikzai 145 (209); George Dockrell 3/160 (45 overs)		261 (91.4 overs); Andrew Balbirnie 62 (88); Rashid Khan 5/99 (31 overs)
		104 (40 overs) (f/o); Niall O'Brien 15 (15); Mohammad Nabi 6/40 (20 overs)

Afghanistan won by an innings and 172 runs
Greater Noida Sports Complex Ground, Greater Noida
Umpires: Ahmed Shah Pakteen (Afg) and C. K. Nandan (Ind)
Player of the match: Asghar Stanikzai (Afg)

- Afghanistan won the toss and elected to bat.
- Mohammad Nabi became Afghanistan's leading wicket-taker in the Intercontinental Cup.

7–10 April 2017
Scorecard

Papua New Guinea	v	United Arab Emirates
194 (85.3 overs); Jack Vare 38 (59); Ahmed Raza 3/38 (18.3 overs)		441/8d (150.3 overs); Muhammad Usman 103 (183); Mahuru Dai 4/126 (52.3 overs)
286 (86.4 overs); Lega Siaka 142* (232); Mohammad Naveed 4/78 (20.4 overs)		42/1 (5.5 overs); Shaiman Anwar 32* (19); Norman Vanua 1/10 (3 overs)

United Arab Emirates won by 9 wickets
Sheikh Zayed Cricket Stadium, Abu Dhabi
Umpires: Akbar Ali (UAE) and Shozab Raza (Pak)

- Papua New Guinea won the toss and elected to bat.
- Nosaina Pokana (PNG) and Imran Haider (UAE) both made their first-class debuts.
- Muhammad Usman, Saqlain Haider (both UAE) and Lega Siaka (PNG) all scored their maiden first-class centuries.

6–9 June 2017
Scorecard

Namibia	v	Scotland
403/7d (104 overs); Jan Frylinck 158 (179); Safyaan Sharif 3/63 (20 overs)		223/2 (57.5 overs); George Munsey 100* (180); Stephan Baard 1/26 (7 overs)

Match drawn
Cambusdoon New Ground, Ayr
Umpires: Allan Haggo (Sco) and Sharfuddoula (Ban)

- Namibia won the toss and elected to bat.
- No play was possible on days 1 and 3 due to rain. Rain prevented any play before lunch on day 4.

=== Round 6 ===
15–18 August 2017
Scorecard

Ireland	v	Netherlands
477/6d (131 overs); Andrew Balbirnie 205* (336); Shane Snater 5/116 (36 overs)		375 (113.5 overs); Max O'Dowd 105 (151); Boyd Rankin 5/49 (19.5 overs)
240/7d (52 overs); William Porterfield 108 (140); Wesley Barresi 3/42 (7 overs)		186/4 (76 overs); Stephan Myburgh 85 (98); Simi Singh 2/19 (14 overs)

Match drawn
Malahide Cricket Club Ground, Malahide
Umpires: Mark Hawthorne (Ire) and Heath Kearns (Jer)

- Netherlands won the toss and elected to field.
- Daniel ter Braak, Tobias Visee and Saqib Zulfiqar (Ned) all made their first-class debuts.
- Andrew Balbirnie (Ire) scored his maiden first-class century and his maiden first-class double century.
- Andrew Balbirnie became the third batsman for Ireland to score an international double century.

16–19 September 2017
Scorecard

United Arab Emirates	v	Namibia
269 (85.3 overs); Adnan Mufti 110 (186); JJ Smit 4/37 (17.3 overs)		212 (67.5 overs); Gerhard Erasmus 78* (112); Ahmed Raza 6/61 (19.5 overs)
157 (48.5 overs); Chirag Suri 41 (56); Craig Williams 5/22 (10.5 overs)		180 (66.2 overs); Craig Williams 48 (50); Rohan Mustafa 3/38 (16 overs)

United Arab Emirates won by 34 runs
Wanderers Cricket Ground, Windhoek
Umpires: Bongani Jele (SA) and Andrew Louw (Nam)

- United Arab Emirates won the toss and elected to bat.
- Petrus Burger (Nam) and Chirag Suri (UAE) both made their first-class debuts.
- Adnan Mufti (UAE) scored his maiden century in first-class cricket.

1–4 October 2017
Scorecard

Papua New Guinea	v	Scotland
404 (116.3 overs); Norman Vanua 64 (124); Safyaan Sharif 4/94 (26 overs)		514 (168.2 overs); Richie Berrington 129 (297); Mahuru Dai 3/91 (37 overs)
263/3 (68 overs); Lega Siaka 83 (135); Alasdair Evans 1/22 (5 overs)

Match drawn
Amini Park, Port Moresby
Umpires: Alu Kapa (PNG) and Sam Nogajski (Aus)

- Papua New Guinea won the toss and elected to bat.
- Damien Ravu (PNG) and Michael Leask (Sco) both made their first-class debuts.

20–23 October 2017
Scorecard

Hong Kong	v	Afghanistan
142 (47 overs); Babar Hayat 39 (47); Rashid Khan 5/65 (18 overs)		465/5d (88 overs); Asghar Stanikzai 125 (129); Anshuman Rath 1/22 (2 overs)
150 (39.4 overs); Anshuman Rath 59* (92); Zahir Khan 4/16 (6.4 overs)

Afghanistan won by an innings and 173 runs
Mission Road Ground, Mong Kok
Umpires: Sharfuddoula (Ban) and Tabarak Dar (HK)
Player of the match: Rashid Khan (Afg)

- Hong Kong won the toss and elected to bat.
- Haroon Arshad and Kyle Christie (HK) both made their first-class debuts.

=== Round 7 ===
The ICC announced the dates and venues for the final round of fixtures on 23 October 2017.

29 November–2 December 2017
Scorecard

Papua New Guinea	v	Hong Kong
237 (77.3 overs); Tony Ura 62 (104); Nadeem Ahmed 5/72 (29.3 overs)		348 (139.3 overs); Babar Hayat 214* (421); Chad Soper 4/33 (32 overs)
82 (33.5 overs); Tony Ura 16 (16); Ehsan Khan 5/13 (8.5 overs)

Hong Kong won by an innings and 29 runs
Sharjah Cricket Stadium, Sharjah
Umpires: Nigel Duguid (WI) and Ahmed Shah Pakteen (Afg)
Player of the match: Babar Hayat (HK)

- Papua New Guinea won the toss and elected to bat.
- Cameron McAuslan (HK) and Kiplin Doriga (PNG) both made their first-class debuts.
- Babar Hayat (HK) became the first batsman for Hong Kong to score a double century in first-class cricket.

29 November–2 December 2017
Scorecard

Afghanistan	v	United Arab Emirates
510/9d (147 overs); Ihsanullah 124 (242); Ahmed Raza 5/148 (53 overs)		197 (64.5 overs); Shaiman Anwar 85 (158); Zahir Khan 3/30 (11 overs)
21/0 (5.3 overs); Ihsanullah 18* (16)		331 (100.3 overs) (f/o); Chirag Suri 81 (149); Rashid Khan 5/83 (36.3 overs)

Afghanistan won by 10 wickets
Sheikh Zayed Stadium, Abu Dhabi
Umpires: Allan Haggo (Sco) and Ahsan Raza (Pak)
Player of the match: Rashid Khan (Afg)

- United Arab Emirates won the toss and elected to field.
- Amir Hayat (UAE) made his first-class debut.
- Ihsanullah and Rahmat Shah Zurmatai made the highest partnership for Afghanistan in first-class cricket, scoring 197 runs for the second wicket.
- Rohan Mustafa and Chirag Suri made the highest opening partnership for the United Arab Emirates in the Intercontinental Cup (146).

29 November–2 December 2017
Scorecard

Netherlands	v	Namibia
501/8d (117.4 overs); Roelof van der Merwe 175 (193); Craig Williams 4/71 (17 overs)		203 (72 overs); Stephan Baard 111 (186); Vivian Kingma 3/22 (13 overs)
223/5d (52.3 overs); Peter Borren 85 (106); Danie van Schoor 2/39 (8.3 overs)		290 (88.4 overs); Sarel Burger 70 (139); Shane Snater 5/88 (18.4 overs)

Netherlands won by 231 runs
ICC Academy Ground 1, Dubai
Umpires: Akbar Ali (UAE) and Sharfuddoula (Ban)
Player of the match: Roelof van der Merwe (Ned)

- Namibia won the toss and elected to field.
- Bas de Leede, Scott Edwards and Ali Ahmed (Ned) all made their first-class debuts.

29 November–2 December 2017
Scorecard

Ireland	v	Scotland
251 (81 overs); Kevin O'Brien 78* (97); Stu Whittingham 3/23 (15 overs)		141 (52.2 overs); George Munsey 38 (59); Boyd Rankin 4/45 (13.2 overs)
271 (68.4 overs); Simi Singh 59 (116); Stu Whittingham 5/70 (14.4 overs)		178 (57.3 overs); Mark Watt 43 (61); Peter Chase 4/52 (11.3 overs)

Ireland won by 203 runs
Dubai International Cricket Stadium, Dubai
Umpires: Huub Jansen (Ned) and Nitin Menon (Ind)
Player of the match: Kevin O'Brien (Ire)

- Scotland won the toss and elected to field.
- Mitchell Rao (Sco) made his first-class debut.

== See also ==
- 2015-17 ICC World Cricket League Championship
