= Pipi Raho =

Papua New Guinean cricketer (born 1988)

Personal information
- Born: 4 March 1988 (age 38); Port Moresby, Papua New Guinea
- Batting: Right-handed

International information
- National side: Papua New Guinea
- Only ODI (cap 7): 8 November 2014 v Hong Kong
- T20I debut (cap 17): 7 February 2016 v Ireland
- Last T20I: 9 February 2021 v Ireland
- Source: ESPNcricinfo, 25 March 2022

Pipi Raho (born 4 March 1988) is a Papua New Guinean cricketer. He made his One Day International debut on 8 November 2014 against Hong Kong in Australia. His Twenty20 International debut in February 2016 was against Ireland in Australia.
