= Hong Kong cricket team against Papua New Guinea in Australia in 2014–15 =

International cricket tour

Hong Kong cricket team against Papua New Guinea in 2014–15
	Hong Kong	Papua New Guinea
- Dates: 8 November – 13 November 2014
Captains	James Atkinson	Chris Amini

One Day International series
- Results: Papua New Guinea won the 2-match series 2–0
Most runs	James Atkinson (81)	Lega Siaka (140)
Most wickets	Tanwir Afzal (3)	Norman Vanua (4)

The Hong Kong cricket team and Papua New Guinea cricket team toured Australia from 8 to 13 November 2014, playing two One Day Internationals (ODI) and a three-day match. These were the first ODI matches to be played by Papua New Guinea since being granted ODI status by the International Cricket Council. Papua New Guinea won the ODI series 2–0, becoming the first country to win their first two ODI matches. The matches were played at the Tony Ireland Stadium in Townsville, which had recently been accredited as an international venue by the ICC.

== Squads ==
ODIs
Hong Kong	Papua New Guinea
Jamie Atkinson (c, wk); Waqas Barkat (vc); Aizaz Khan; Ankur Vasishta; Anshuman Rath; Babar Hayat; Ehsan Nawaz; Haseeb Amjad; Irfan Ahmed; Muhammad Khan; Nadeem Ahmed; Kinchit Shah; Tanwir Afzal	Chris Amini (c); Jack Vare (vc, wk); Charles Amini; Mahuru Dai; Willie Gavera; Geraint Jones; Vani Vagi Morea; Kila Pala; Pipi Raho; John Reva; Lega Siaka; Tony Ura; Assad Vala; Norman Vanua

== ODI series ==
=== 1st ODI ===
8 November 2014
Scorecard

Hong Kong; 202 (48.3)	v	Papua New Guinea; 203/6 (40 overs)
Jamie Atkinson 59 (79); Assad Vala 2/17 (5 overs)		Charles Amini 61* (67); Irfan Ahmed 3/51 (8 overs)

Papua New Guinea won by 4 wickets
Tony Ireland Stadium, Townsville
Umpires: Phil Jones (NZ) and Paul Wilson (Aus)

- Hong Kong won the toss and chose to bat.
- Charles Amini, Chris Amini, Mahuru Dai, Willie Gavera, Vani Morea, Pipi Raho, Lega Siaka, Tony Ura, Assad Vala, Jack Vare and Geraint Jones all made their ODI debuts for Papua New Guinea. Jones had previously played 49 ODIs for England.
- Aizaz Khan, Anshuman Rath and Kinchit Shah made their ODI debuts for Hong Kong.

=== 2nd ODI ===
9 November 2014
10:00 am
Scorecard

Hong Kong; 261 (49.3 overs)	v	Papua New Guinea; 264/7 (49.2 overs)
Babar Hayat 56 (60); Norman Vanua 4/60 (9.3 overs)		Lega Siaka 109 (114); Nadeem Ahmed 2/8 (10 overs)

Papua New Guinea won by 3 wickets
Tony Ireland Stadium, Townsville
Umpires: Phil Jones (NZ) and Paul Wilson (Aus)

- Hong Kong won the toss and chose to bat.
- Norman Vanua (PNG) made his ODI debut.
- Lega Siaka became the first player from Papua New Guinea to score an ODI century.

== Three-day match ==
11–13 November 2014
Scorecard

Papua New Guinea	v	Hong Kong
469/7d (104 overs); Assad Vala 98 (118); Nadeem Ahmed 4/114 (28 overs)		205 (67.5 overs); Anshuman Rath 72 (112); Charles Amini 3/34 (14 overs)
114/8d (23 overs); Assad Vala 40* (13); Haseeb Amjad 3/35 (10 overs)		245 (71.5 overs); James Atkinson 63 (87); Norman Vanua 5/36 (15.5 overs)

Papua New Guinea won by 133 runs
Tony Ireland Stadium, Townsville
Umpires: Nigel Morrison (Van) & Alu Kapa (PNG)

- Papua New Guinea won the toss and chose to bat.
- Players per side 14 (11 batting, 11 fielding)
