= Riverway Stadium =

Cricket and Australian football stadium in Queensland

- Townsville Cricket Ground
- Interactive map of Riverway Stadium
- Former names: Tony Ireland Stadium; Pioneer Park
- Address: Australia
- Location: 2 Sporting Drive, Thuringowa Central, Townsville, Queensland 4817
- Coordinates: 19°19′2″S 146°43′54″E
- Owner: Townsville City Council
- Capacity: 10,000 (1013 seated)
- Surface: Grass

Construction
- Opened: 2007
- Cost: A$16.5m

Tenants
- Thuringowa Bulldogs AFL club Gold Coast Suns (AFL) (2019); Queensland Bulls

Ground information
- Tenants: Queensland Cricket Association

International information
- First men's ODI: 8 November 2014: Hong Kong v Papua New Guinea
- Last men's ODI: 3 September 2022: Australia v Zimbabwe
- First men's T20I: 6 February 2016: Papua New Guinea v Ireland
- Last men's T20I: 9 February 2016: Papua New Guinea v Ireland
- As of 3 September 2022; Source: ESPN Cricinfo

Riverway Stadium, also known as Townsville Cricket Ground, is an international-standard cricket and Australian rules football stadium in Thuringowa Central, Townsville, Queensland. The stadium is a part of the Riverway sporting and cultural complex.

== Facilities ==
The stadium includes the oval, a 1,013-seat grandstand and supporting facilities, a practice oval and cricket practice nets. The design was modeled on Brisbane's Gabba cricket ground specifications and has a six-turf wicket block. Riverway Stadium has a maximum capacity of 10,000+ This was achieved on New Year's Eve 2007 when 10,024 spectators attended a Twenty20 cricket match between Queensland and Victoria. The stadium is also home to the University Hawks and Thuringowa Bulldogs AFL clubs, and the AFL's local regional office. In June 2009, the stadium hosted a 4-day first class match between Pakistan A and the Australia A cricket team. The stadium also hosted some matches of the 2012 ICC Under-19 Cricket World Cup which was held in Australia from 11 August 2012. India emerged as the winner of Under-19 Cricket World Cup after beating Australia in the final at the Riverway Stadium.

In November 2014, the stadium hosted its first international match between debutants Papua New Guinea and Hong Kong. The Stadium became the 10th ODI venue in Australia.

The stadium hosted Townsville's first AFL game for premiership points on 15 June 2019 when the Gold Coast Suns took a home game to Riverway Stadium against St Kilda.

=== Lighting ===
In 2008, the inadequacy of the current "temporary" lighting was highlighted when a Queensland v Western Australia AFL representative match was rescheduled from dusk to mid afternoon. Costs to install lighting adequate for televised sport have been estimated at five million dollars.

== Attendance records ==
Top 5 Sports Attendance Records

No.	Date	Teams	Sport	Competition	Crowd
1	31 December 2007	Queensland Bulls v. Victoria Bushrangers	Cricket	T20	10,024
2	15 June 2019	Gold Coast Suns v. St Kilda	Australian Rules Football	AFL	7,243
3	2 March 2013	Gold Coast Suns v. North Melbourne Kangaroos	Australian Rules Football	AFL (preseason)	7,216
4	23 February 2014	Gold Coast Suns v. Brisbane Lions	Australian Rules Football	AFL (preseason)	6,426
5	1 March 2015	Gold Coast Suns v. Geelong Cats	Australian Rules Football	AFL (preseason)	4,431

^{Last updated on 15 June 2019}

== International cricket ==
In October 2014, Riverway Stadium received ICC-accreditation as an international venue. It hosted a two-match ODI series featuring Hong Kong and Papua New Guinea in November 2014, with the latter making their ODI debut. PNG won the series 2–0.

In February 2016, the stadium hosted a three-match T20I series featuring Ireland and Papua New Guinea, which was won by Ireland (2-1). A 2015-2017 ICC Intercontinental Cup match was also played between the two teams, which Ireland won by 145 runs.

In 2022, the ground served as the venue for Australia's home ODI series against Zimbabwe. The hosts won the first two matches comfortably, but were stunned in the final match, which Zimbabwe won by three wickets.

=== One Day Internationals hosted ===
As of September 2022, the stadium has hosted the following ODI matches.

Team (A)	Team (B)	Winner	Margin	Year	Note
Papua New Guinea	Hong Kong	Papua New Guinea	By 4 Wickets	2014	Scorecard
Papua New Guinea	Hong Kong	Papua New Guinea	By 3 Wickets	2014	Scorecard
Australia	Zimbabwe	Australia	By 5 Wickets	2022	Scorecard
Australia	Zimbabwe	Australia	By 8 Wickets	2022	Scorecard
Australia	Zimbabwe	Zimbabwe	By 3 Wickets	2022	Scorecard

==== International centuries ====
One ODI century has been scored at the venue.

No.	Score	Player	Team	Balls	Opposing team	Date	Result
1	109	Lega Siaka	Papua New Guinea	114	Hong Kong	9 November 2014	Won

==== International five-wicket hauls ====
Two ODI five-wicket hauls have been taken at the venue.

No.	Figures	Player	Team	Opposing team	Date	Result
1	5/33	Cameron Green	Australia	Zimbabwe	28 August 2022	Won
2	5/10	Ryan Burl	Zimbabwe	Australia	3 September 2022	Won

=== Twenty20 Internationals hosted ===
Team (A)	Team (B)	Winner	Margin	Year	Note
Papua New Guinea	Ireland	Ireland	By 5 Wickets	2016	Scorecard
Papua New Guinea	Ireland	Ireland	By 7 runs (D/L)	2016	Scorecard
Papua New Guinea	Ireland	Papua New Guinea	By 11 runs	2016	Scorecard
