= List of Papua New Guinea Twenty20 International cricketers =

Papua New Guinea were first granted T20I status in January 2014, simultaneously being granted One Day International (ODI) status. This was a result of their performance at the 2014 World Cup Qualifier, where they placed fourth to narrowly miss out on qualifying for the 2015 World Cup. The team made its ODI debut in November 2014, against Hong Kong, but did not play a full Twenty20 International until July 2015, during the 2015 World Twenty20 Qualifier. Papua New Guinea's debut in the format was originally intended to come in its second match of the tournament, against Hong Kong, but the match was rained out. Instead, the team's first Twenty20 International came against Ireland, with PNG winning by two wickets. In April 2018, the ICC decided to grant full Twenty20 International (T20I) status to all its members. Therefore, all Twenty20 matches played between Papua New Guinea and other ICC members after 1 January 2019 will be eligible for T20I status.

This list comprises all members of the Papua New Guinea cricket team who have played at least one T20I match. It is initially arranged in the order in which each player won his first Twenty20 cap. Where more than one player won his first Twenty20 cap in the same match, their surnames are listed alphabetically.

== Key ==
General

- ‡ – Captain
- † – Wicket-keeper
- First – Year of debut
- Last – Year of latest game
- Mat – Number of matches played

Batting

- Runs – Runs scored in career
- HS – Highest score
- Avg – Runs scored per dismissal
- * – Batsman remained not out
- 50 – Half-centuries scored
- 100 – Centuries scored

Bowling

- Balls – Balls bowled in career
- Wkt – Wickets taken in career
- BBI – Best bowling in an innings
- Ave – Average runs per wicket

Fielding

- Ca – Catches taken
- St – Stumpings affected

== List of players ==
Statistics are correct as of 18 May 2026.

Papua New Guinea T20I cricketers
General					Batting					Bowling				Fielding		Ref
No.	Name	First	Last	Mat	Runs	HS	Avg	50	100	Balls	Wkt	BBI	Ave	Ca	St	Ref
1	Charles Amini	2015	2024	59	1,028	91*	24.47	5	0	870	47	4/18	19.27	18	0	
2	Mahuru Dai	2015	2017	9	105	31	13.12	0	0	150	4	2/13	39.25	5	0	
3	Willie Gavera	2015	2017	6	3	2	1.50	0	0	102	5	3/17	22.60	1	0	
4	Loa Nou	2015	2015	3	2	2*	–	0	0	60	1	1/24	65.00	0	0	
5	Kila Pala	2015	2015	2	41	22*	41.00	0	0	–	–	–	–	1	0	
6	John Reva	2015	2019	9	16	7	4.00	0	0	127	7	2/11	21.14	1	0	
7	Lega Siaka	2015	2026	70	1019	85	17.87	3	0	192	13	3/16	12.46	42	0	
8	Tony Ura‡	2015	2026	66	1,900	107*	33.92	16	2	–	–	–	–	26	0	
9	Assad Vala‡	2015	2026	72	1,447	93*	24.94	8	0	653	44	3/7	15.47	32	0	
10	Norman Vanua‡	2015	2024	58	696	71	18.81	3	0	1042	66	5/17	19.01	21	0	
11	Jack Vare‡†	2015	2017	8	68	38	9.71	0	0	–	–	–	–	4	2	
12	Vani Morea†	2015	2017	5	35	19	7.00	0	0	–	–	–	–	0	0	
13	Chad Soper	2015	2024	31	155	19	14.09	0	0	557	34	3/11	17.82	5	0	
14	Sese Bau	2016	2026	65	1,200	85	24.00	6	0	443	24	3/6	19.41	24	0	
15	Hiri Hiri	2016	2024	28	343	53*	19.05	1	0	42	3	2/7	8.33	8	0	
16	Nosaina Pokana	2016	2024	31	49	12	7.00	0	0	593	29	3/21	23.06	8	0	
17	Pipi Raho	2016	2016	2	10	8*	–	0	0	18	3	3/11	6.66	0	0	
18	Alei Nao	2017	2026	27	125	30*	20.83	0	0	520	27	3/15	19.92	8	0	
19	Dogodo Bau	2017	2017	1	–	–	–	–	–	–	–	–	–	0	0	
20	Kiplin Doriga†	2019	2025	43	359	46*	12.37	0	0	–	–	–	–	30	5	
21	Jason Kila	2019	2025	17	66	27*	13.20	0	0	102	3	1/5	33.00	3	0	
22	Damien Ravu	2019	2025	27	33	6	4.12	0	0	469	33	5/15	16.93	8	0	
23	Simon Atai†	2019	2022	18	64	28*	7.11	0	0	90	3	1/6	36.66	6	0	
24	Riley Hekure	2019	2023	24	77	18	5.92	0	0	323	11	2/22	36.45	6	0	
25	Kabua Morea	2021	2026	26	72	16*	10.28	0	0	536	38	5/9	16.50	6	0	
26	Semo Kamea	2022	2024	19	8	2*	2.00	0	0	392	21	3/28	22.80	5	0	
27	Hila Vare†	2022	2026	22	100	18	7.69	0	0	–	–	–	–	9	2	
28	John Kariko	2023	2026	28	26	9*	8.66	0	0	605	37	4/11	13.75	8	0	
29	Jack Gardner	2023	2024	6	0	0*	0.00	0	0	102	3	2/27	47.00	2	0	
30	Michael Charlie	2023	2023	2	0	0	0.00	0	0	30	2	1/12	14.00	1	0	
31	Boio Ray	2025	2026	9	101	46	12.62	0	0	12	0	–	–	2	0	
32	Peter Karoho	2025	2025	1	7	7	7.00	0	0	–	–	–	–	0	0	
33	Patrick Nou	2025	2026	8	60	19	10.00	0	0	24	0	–	–	3	0	
34	Gaudi Toka	2025	2025	2	31	29	15.50	0	0	18	1	1/20	20.00	1	0	
35	Ryan Ani	2026	2026	2	12	9	12.00	0	0	–	–	–	–	1	0	
36	Aue Oru	2026	2026	6	4	4	4.00	0	0	102	10	4/11	8.80	2	0	
37	Gaba Frank	2026	2026	2	4	4	4.00	0	0	12	1	1/3	22.00	3	0	

Note: The following matches include one or more missing catchers in their Cricinfo scorecard and hence statistics (as of 19 July 2019):

- vs. Samoa (10 July 2019); 4 missing catchers
- vs. Vanuatu (12 July 2019); 2 missing catchers
- vs. Vanuatu (13 July 2019); 1 missing catcher

== See also ==
- List of Papua New Guinean first-class cricketers
- Papua New Guinea ODI cricketers
