= Matt Stiller =

Hong Kong cricketer (born 1985)

Personal information
- Born: 14 February 1985 (age 41)
- Nickname: Stifler, Stillsy, The Sprinkler
- Batting: Right-handed
- Bowling: Right-arm medium

International information
- National side: Hong Kong
- Source: ESPNcricinfo, 10 February 2017

Matt Stiller (born 14 February 1985) is a Hong Kong cricketer.

He made his first-class debut for Hong Kong against The Netherlands in the 2015–17 ICC Intercontinental Cup tournament on 10 February 2017.

He has since moved into a career as a professional golfer. He is sponsored by TaylorMade and Zebra and recently qualified for the Masters at Augusta in 2023.
