= Qais Farooq =

Emirati cricketer (born 1978)

Personal information
- Born: 31 August 1978 (age 48)
- Batting: Right-handed
- Relatives: Salman Farooq (brother)
- Source: Cricinfo, 11 November 2015

Qais Farooq (born 31 August 1978) is an Emirati former cricketer. He made his first-class debut for the United Arab Emirates against Hong Kong in the 2015–17 ICC Intercontinental Cup tournament on 11 November 2015.
