= Mitchell Rao =

Scottish cricketer (born 1997)

Personal information
- Full name: Mitchell David Rao
- Born: 3 April 1997 (age 29); Glasgow, Scotland
- Batting: Left-handed
- Bowling: Right-arm off break
- Role: Bowler

International information
- National side: Scotland (2017)

Career statistics
Competition	First-class
Matches	1
Runs scored	16
Batting average	8.00
100s/50s	0/0
Top score	15
Balls bowled	102
Wickets	1
Bowling average	57.00
5 wickets in innings	0
10 wickets in match	0
Best bowling	1/38
Catches/stumpings	0/–
- Source: Cricinfo, 20 October 2019

Mitchell David Rao (born 3 April 1997) is a Scottish cricketer. He made his first-class debut for Scotland against Ireland in the 2015–17 ICC Intercontinental Cup on 29 November 2017. Prior to his first-class debut, he was named in Scotland's squad for the 2016 Under-19 Cricket World Cup.
