= Nosaina Pokana =

Papua New Guinean cricketer

Personal information
- Born: 12 April 1996 (age 30)

International information
- National side: Papua New Guinea
- ODI debut (cap 19): 31 March 2017 v UAE
- Last ODI: 21 September 2022 v Namibia
- T20I debut (cap 16): 6 February 2016 v Ireland
- Last T20I: 31 March 2022 v Nepal

Career statistics
| Competition | ODI | T20I | FC | LA |
|---|---|---|---|---|
| Matches | 20 | 25 | 2 | 26 |
| Runs scored | 57 | 35 | 17 | 81 |
| Batting average | 7.12 | 7.00 | 17.00 | 8.10 |
| 100s/50s | 0/0 | 0/0 | 0/0 | 0/0 |
| Top score | 11* | 9 | 9* | 11* |
| Balls bowled | 929 | 467 | 318 | 1103 |
| Wickets | 25 | 23 | 2 | 35 |
| Bowling average | 28.60 | 22.56 | 62.00 | 24.00 |
| 5 wickets in innings | 0 | 0 | 0 | 1 |
| 10 wickets in match | 0 | 0 | 0 | 0 |
| Best bowling | 3/25 | 3/21 | 1/48 | 5/14 |
| Catches/stumpings | 7/– | 6/– | 1/– | 8/– |
Medal record
Representing Papua New Guinea
Men's Cricket
Pacific Games
| Gold medal – first place | 2019 Apia | Twenty20 International |
| Silver medal – second place | 2015 Port Moresby | 20 over cricket |
- Source: Cricinfo, 21 September 2022

Nosaina Pokana (born 12 April 1996) is a Papua New Guinean cricketer. He made his Twenty20 International (T20I) debut on 6 February 2016 against Ireland in Australia. He made his List A debut in the 2015–17 ICC World Cricket League Championship on 30 May 2016 against Kenya. His One Day International (ODI) debut, on 31 March 2017, was against the United Arab Emirates in the 2015–17 ICC World Cricket League Championship. His first-class debut, on 7 April 2017, was also against the United Arab Emirates, in the 2015–17 ICC Intercontinental Cup.

In January 2018, the International Cricket Council (ICC) found his bowling action to be illegal, and suspended him from bowling in international cricket. In August 2018, he was named in Papua New Guinea's squad for Group A of the 2018–19 ICC World Twenty20 East Asia-Pacific Qualifier tournament. In March 2019, he was named in Papua New Guinea's squad for the Regional Finals of the 2018–19 ICC World Twenty20 East Asia-Pacific Qualifier tournament. He was in Papua New Guinea's squad for the 2019 ICC World Cricket League Division Two tournament in Namibia. In Papua New Guinea's match against Oman, Pokana took his first five-wicket haul in List A cricket. He was the leading wicket-taker for Papua New Guinea in the tournament, with 13 dismissals in six matches.

In June 2019, he was selected to represent the Papua New Guinea cricket team in the men's tournament at the 2019 Pacific Games. In September 2019, he was named in Papua New Guinea's squad for the 2019 ICC T20 World Cup Qualifier tournament in the United Arab Emirates. Ahead of the tournament, the International Cricket Council (ICC) named him as the player to watch in Papua New Guinea's squad.

Pokana was in Papua New Guinea's squad for the 2021 ICC Men's T20 World Cup.
