= Hiri Hiri =

Papua New Guinean cricketer

Personal information
- Full name: Hiri Hiri
- Born: 1 May 1995 (age 31)
- Batting: Right-handed
- Bowling: Right-arm off break

International information
- National side: Papua New Guinea
- ODI debut (cap 15): 4 November 2016 v Hong Kong
- Last ODI: 15 March 2023 v United Arab Emirates
- T20I debut (cap 15): 6 February 2016 v Ireland
- Last T20I: 23 July 2023 v Philippines

Career statistics
Competition	ODI	T20I
Matches	24	6
Runs scored	275	17
Batting average	13.75	3.40
100s/50s	0/0	0/0
Top score	31*	8
Balls bowled	102	6
Wickets	3	0
Bowling average	37.66	–
5 wickets in innings	0	–
10 wickets in match	0	–
Best bowling	1/6	–
Catches/stumpings	1/–	1/–
- Source: Cricinfo, 23 July 2023

Hiri Hiri (born 1 May 1995) is a Papua New Guinea cricketer. He has represented his country at youth level in the 2014 Under-19 Cricket World Cup and at senior level in both One Day International and Twenty20 International cricket.

== Youth cricket ==
Hiri played for Papua New Guinea under-19s in the 2014 Under-19 Cricket World Cup. He played six matches and scored 87 runs at an average of 14.50.

== International cricket ==
He made his List A debut in the 2015–17 ICC World Cricket League Championship against Nepal on 18 November 2015, and hisTwenty20 International debut against Ireland in Australia on 6 February 2016. Hiri's One Day International debut was on 4 November 2016 against Hong Kong. He was in Papua New Guinea's squad for the last ever World Cricket League tournament, the 2019 ICC World Cricket League Division Two tournament in Namibia.

In June 2019, he was selected to represent the Papua New Guinea cricket team in the men's tournament at the 2019 Pacific Games.

Hiri returned to Papua New Guinea's national squad in the 2019 Scotland Tri-Nation Series, the first tri-series of the 2019–22 ICC Cricket World Cup League 2 tournament. He only played in Papua New Guinea's final match against Oman. He scored 31 not out batting at number nine, his highest ODI score, and one of only two players in Papua New Guinea's team to reach 30 in a four-wicket loss.

He was in Papua New Guinea's squad for the 2019 ICC T20 World Cup Qualifier tournament in the United Arab Emirates. In August 2021, Hiri was named in Papua New Guinea's squad for the 2021 ICC Men's T20 World Cup.

In May 2024, he was named in Papua New Guinea’s squad for the 2024 ICC Men's T20 World Cup tournament.
