= Simon Atai =

Papua New Guinean cricketer (born 1999)

Personal information
- Born: 19 September 1999 (age 27)

International information
- National side: Papua New Guinea (2019-present)
- ODI debut (cap 23): 27 April 2019 v USA
- Last ODI: 21 September 2022 v Namibia
- T20I debut (cap 23): 8 July 2019 v Samoa
- Last T20I: 15 July 2022 v Zimbabwe
Medal record
Representing Papua New Guinea
Men's Cricket
Pacific Games
| Gold medal – first place | 2019 Apia | Twenty20 International |
- Source: Cricinfo, 21 September 2022

Simon Atai (born 19 September 1999) is a Papua New Guinean cricketer. In December 2017, he was named in Papua New Guinea's squad for the 2018 Under-19 Cricket World Cup. He was the leading run-scorer for Papua New Guinea in the tournament, with 116 runs in six matches.

He was in Papua New Guinea's squad for the 2019 ICC World Cricket League Division Two tournament in Namibia. He made his List A debut for Papua New Guinea against Oman in the 2019 ICC World Cricket League Division Two tournament on 26 April 2019. Papua New Guinea finished in the top four places in the tournament, therefore gaining One Day International (ODI) status. Atai made his ODI debut on 27 April 2019, against the United States, in the tournament's third-place playoff.

He made his Twenty20 International (T20I) debut for Papua New Guinea on 8 July 2019, against Samoa, in the men's tournament at the 2019 Pacific Games. In September 2019, he was named in Papua New Guinea's squad for the 2019 ICC T20 World Cup Qualifier tournament in the United Arab Emirates. In August 2021, Atai was named in Papua New Guinea's squad for the 2021 ICC Men's T20 World Cup.
