= Semo Kamea =

Papua New Guinean cricketer (born 2001)

Personal information
- Full name: Semo Igo Kamea
- Born: 21 August 2001 (age 25)
- Role: Bowler

International information
- National side: Papua New Guinea
- ODI debut (cap 27): 25 March 2022 v Nepal
- Last ODI: 15 March 2023 v United Arab Emirates
- T20I debut (cap 26): 1 April 2022 v Malaysia
- Last T20I: 17 July 2022 v USA
- Source: Cricinfo, 16 March 2023

Semo Kamea (born 21 August 2001) is a Papua New Guinean cricketer. In March 2022, he was named in Papua New Guinea's One Day International (ODI) squads for both the 2022 United Arab Emirates Tri-Nation Series and 2022 Papua New Guinea Tri-Nation Series, as well as their ODI and Twenty20 International (T20I) squad for the tour of Nepal.

He made his ODI debut on against Nepal and his T20I debut against Malaysia in March and April 2022, respectively.

In May 2024, he was named in Papua New Guinea’s squad for the 2024 ICC Men's T20 World Cup tournament.
