= Gaudi Toka =

Papua New Guinean cricketer (born 1994)

Personal information
- Born: 17 June 1994 (age 32)

International information
- National side: Papua New Guinea
- ODI debut (cap 24): 14 August 2019 v Oman
- Last ODI: 15 March 2023 v United Arab Emirates
- Source: Cricinfo, 16 March 2023

Gaudi Toka (born 17 June 1994) is a Papua New Guinean cricketer. In August 2019, he was named in Papua New Guinea's One Day International (ODI) squad for the 2019 Scotland Tri-Nation Series. He made his ODI debut against Oman, on 14 August 2019. Prior to his ODI debut, he was part of Papua New Guinea's squad for the 2014 Under-19 Cricket World Cup. In August 2021, Toka was named in Papua New Guinea's squad for the 2021 ICC Men's T20 World Cup.
