= Sese Bau =

Papua New Guinean cricketer

Personal information
- Born: 23 June 1992 (age 34)
- Batting: Left-handed
- Bowling: Right-arm medium

International information
- National side: Papua New Guinea (2015–present)
- ODI debut (cap 14): 4 November 2016 v Hong Kong
- Last ODI: 15 March 2023 v UAE
- T20I debut (cap 14): 6 February 2016 v Ireland
- Last T20I: 18 May 2026 v Japan

Career statistics
Competition	ODI	T20I	FC	LA
Matches	25	24	6	35
Runs scored	441	406	227	791
Batting average	18.37	25.42	20.63	23.96
100s/50s	0/1	0/1	0/1	0/4
Top score	59	50	51	80
Balls bowled	198	84	168	450
Wickets	2	4	2	7
Bowling average	74.00	19.75	48.50	42.71
5 wickets in innings	0	0	0	0
10 wickets in match	0	0	0	0
Best bowling	2/35	2/4	2/50	2/35
Catches/stumpings	10/–	8/–	2/–	13/–
- Source: Cricinfo, 16 March 2023

Sese Bau (born 23 June 1992) is a Papua New Guinean cricketer. He made his List A debut in the 2015–17 ICC World Cricket League Championship on 24 June 2015 against the Netherlands. He made his first-class debut in the 2015–17 ICC Intercontinental Cup on 21 November 2015 against Afghanistan.

Bau made his Twenty20 International debut on 6 February 2016 against Ireland in Australia and his One Day International debut on 4 November 2016 against Hong Kong.

He was part of Papua New Guinea's squad for Group A of the 2018–19 ICC World Twenty20 East Asia-Pacific Qualifier tournament. In March 2019, he was named in Papua New Guinea's squad for the Regional Finals of the 2018–19 ICC World Twenty20 East Asia-Pacific Qualifier tournament. He was in Papua New Guinea's squad for the 2019 ICC World Cricket League Division Two tournament in Namibia. He was the leading run-scorer for Papua New Guinea in the tournament, with 141 runs in six matches.

In June 2019, he was selected to represent the Papua New Guinea cricket team in the men's tournament at the 2019 Pacific Games. In September 2019, he was named in Papua New Guinea's squad for the 2019 ICC T20 World Cup Qualifier tournament in the United Arab Emirates. In August 2021, Bau was named in Papua New Guinea's squad for the 2021 ICC Men's T20 World Cup.

In May 2024, he was named in Papua New Guinea's squad for the 2024 ICC Men's T20 World Cup tournament, where he notably became the first PNG crickter to score a half-century in a T20 World Cup.
