= Damien Ravu =

Papua New Guinean cricketer

Personal information
- Full name: Damien Ravu
- Born: 3 May 1994 (age 32); Lae, Morobe, Papua New Guinea
- Batting: Right-handed
- Bowling: Right-arm medium-fast

International information
- National side: Papua New Guinea
- ODI debut (cap 21): 25 November 2017 v Scotland
- Last ODI: 20 September 2022 v Namibia
- T20I debut (cap 25): 22 March 2019 v Philippines
- Last T20I: 12 July 2022 v Uganda

Career statistics
Competition	ODI	FC	LA
Matches	4	2	4
Runs scored	6	32	6
Batting average	2.00	10.66	2.00
100s/50s	0/0	0/0	0/0
Top score	5	32	5
Balls bowled	150	260	150
Wickets	0	3	0
Bowling average	–	45.33	–
5 wickets in innings	–	0	–
10 wickets in match	–	0	–
Best bowling	–	2/40	–
Catches/stumpings	1/–	0/–	1/–
Medal record
Representing Papua New Guinea
Men's Cricket
Pacific Games
Gold medal – first place	2019 Apia	Twenty20 International
- Source: Cricinfo, 20 September 2022

Damien Ravu (born 3 May 1994) is a Papua New Guinean cricketer. He made his first-class debut for Papua New Guinea in the 2015–17 ICC Intercontinental Cup on 1 October 2017. He made his One Day International (ODI) debut against Scotland on 25 November 2017.

In August 2018, he was named in Papua New Guinea's squad for Group A of the 2018–19 ICC World Twenty20 East Asia-Pacific Qualifier tournament.

In March 2019, he was named in Papua New Guinea's squad for the Regional Finals of the 2018–19 ICC World Twenty20 East Asia-Pacific Qualifier tournament. He made his Twenty20 International (T20I) debut against the Philippines on 22 March 2019. The following month, he was named in Papua New Guinea's squad for the 2019 ICC World Cricket League Division Two tournament in Namibia.

In June 2019, he was selected to represent the Papua New Guinea cricket team in the men's tournament at the 2019 Pacific Games. In September 2019, he was named in Papua New Guinea's squad for the 2019 ICC T20 World Cup Qualifier tournament in the United Arab Emirates. He was the leading wicket-taker for Papua New Guinea in the tournament, with twelve dismissals in eight matches.

In August 2021, Ravu was named in Papua New Guinea's squad for the 2021 ICC Men's T20 World Cup.
