= Mahuru Dai =

Papua New Guinean cricketer

Personal information
- Full name: Mahuru Douglas Dai
- Born: 30 May 1984 (age 42); Port Moresby, Papua New Guinea
- Batting: Right-handed
- Bowling: Right-arm leg break
- Role: Batsman

International information
- National side: Papua New Guinea (2005–2018)
- ODI debut (cap 8): 8 November 2014 v Hong Kong
- Last ODI: 17 March 2018 v Hong Kong
- T20I debut (cap 2): 15 July 2015 v Ireland
- Last T20I: 14 April 2017 v UAE

Career statistics
| Competition | ODI | T20I | FC | LA |
|---|---|---|---|---|
| Matches | 18 | 9 | 7 | 47 |
| Runs scored | 454 | 105 | 374 | 822 |
| Batting average | 28.37 | 13.12 | 28.76 | 20.95 |
| 100s/50s | 0/3 | 0/0 | 1/1 | 0/5 |
| Top score | 78* | 31 | 129 | 76* |
| Balls bowled | 954 | 150 | 1,342 | 1,970 |
| Wickets | 18 | 4 | 17 | 45 |
| Bowling average | 37.50 | 39.25 | 37.11 | 30.28 |
| 5 wickets in innings | 0 | 0 | 0 | 0 |
| 10 wickets in match | 0 | 0 | 0 | 0 |
| Best bowling | 3/58 | 2/13 | 4/126 | 4/56 |
| Catches/stumpings | 8/– | 5/– | 4/– | 21/– |
- Source: Cricinfo, 18 March 2018

Mahuru Douglas Dai (born 30 May 1984) is a Papua New Guinean cricketer. A right-handed batsman and right-arm medium pace bowler, Dai has played for the Papua New Guinea national cricket team since 2005.

== Biography ==
Born in Port Moresby in 1984, Dai first represented Papua New Guinea at Under-19 level, playing in the East Asia-Pacific Under-19 Championship in August 2001. Papua New Guinea won the tournament, beating Hong Kong in the final, which qualified them for the following years Under-19 World Cup, which Dai also played in.

In 2004, he played for a combined East Asia-Pacific team in Australia's National Country Cricket Championship prior to a second Under-19 World Cup. He made his debut for the Papua New Guinea senior team in the repêchage tournament of the 2005 ICC Trophy.

Later in the year, he made his List A debut when he represented Papua New Guinea in the 2005 ICC Trophy in Ireland. He again played for the combined East Asia-Pacific team in the Australian National Country Cricket Championship in 2006 and 2007 before returning to the Papua New Guinea team for Division Three of the World Cricket League in Darwin in 2007. Papua New Guinea finished third in that tournament and Dai was named man of the match in the third place play-off against the Cayman Islands after scoring 102 not out at a run a ball.

He represented his country at the 2007 South Pacific Games where the team won a gold medal in the cricket tournament. During the tournament he scored a century in Papua New Guinea's record breaking win over New Caledonia. He has since again represented the combined East Asia-Pacific team in the Australia National Country Cricket Championship.

He made his One Day International debut on 8 November 2014 against Hong Kong in Australia. He made his Twenty20 International debut for Papua New Guinea against Ireland in the 2015 ICC World Twenty20 Qualifier tournament on 15 July 2015.
