= Vani Morea =

Cricket player

Personal information
- Full name: Vani Vagi Morea
- Born: 13 March 1983 (age 43); Port Moresby, Papua New Guinea
- Batting: Right-handed
- Bowling: Right-arm medium

International information
- National side: Papua New Guinea
- ODI debut (cap 9): 8 November 2014 v Hong Kong
- Last ODI: 8 March 2018 v West Indies
- T20I debut (cap 12): 23 July 2015 v Afghanistan
- Last T20I: 12 April 2017 v UAE

Career statistics
Competition	ODI	T20I	FC	LA
Matches	13	5	6	27
Runs scored	313	35	249	778
Batting average	26.08	7.00	20.75	35.36
100s/50s	0/3	0/0	0/2	1/7
Top score	65*	19	61	102*
Catches/stumpings	7/–	0/–	3/–	8/–
- Source: Cricinfo, 18 March 2018

Vani Vagi Morea (born 13 March 1983) is a former Papua New Guinean cricketer. Morea is a right-handed batsman who bowls right-arm medium pace. He was born in Port Moresby.

Morea made his debut for Papua New Guinea in the 2009 World Cricket League Division Three, where he played 5 matches. He later appeared for Papua New Guinea in the 2011 World Cricket League Division Two. It was in this competition that he made his List A debut against Bermuda. He played a further 5 List A matches in the competition, the last coming against Hong Kong. In his 6 matches in the competition, he scored 165 runs at a batting average of 55.00. His highest score of the competition, 74*, came against Hong Kong. Upon the death of his wife in March 2018 he announced his retirement from cricket to look after his children. His last tour with the Barramundis was to Zimbabwe for the 2018 Cricket World Cup Qualifier where he scored a meager 13 runs in three matches before leaving the tournament early to be there for his wife during her final days.

== International career ==
He made his One Day International debut in November 2014 against Hong Kong in Australia. He made his Twenty20 International debut for Papua New Guinea against Afghanistan in the 2015 ICC World Twenty20 Qualifier tournament on 23 July 2015.
