= John Reva =

Papua New Guinean cricketer (born 1990)

Personal information
- Born: 23 September 1990 (age 36); Port Moresby, Papua New Guinea
- Batting: Right-handed
- Bowling: Right-arm medium

International information
- National side: Papua New Guinea
- ODI debut (cap 17): 6 October 2016 v Hong Kong
- Last ODI: 17 March 2018 v Hong Kong
- T20I debut (cap 6): 15 July 2015 v Ireland
- Last T20I: 23 March 2019 v Philippines

Career statistics
Competition	ODI	T20I	FC	LA
Matches	9	9	5	20
Runs scored	62	16	144	191
Batting average	10.33	4.00	16.00	19.10
100s/50s	0/0	0/0	0/0	0/0
Top score	36	7	45	43*
Balls bowled	405	127	567	818
Wickets	13	7	10	23
Bowling average	27.46	21.14	24.40	30.08
5 wickets in innings	0	0	0	0
10 wickets in match	0	0	0	0
Best bowling	3/40	2/11	4/42	4/31
Catches/stumpings	1/–	1/–	3/–	5/–
- Source: ESPNcricinfo, 6 July 2020

John Reva (born 23 September 1990) is a Papua New Guinean first-class cricketer. He made his first-class debut in the 2015–17 ICC Intercontinental Cup against the Netherlands on 16 June 2015. He made his List A debut in the 2015–17 ICC World Cricket League Championship on 22 June 2015, also against the Netherlands. He made his Twenty20 International debut against Ireland in the 2015 ICC World Twenty20 Qualifier tournament on 15 July 2015. He made his One Day International (ODI) debut on 6 November 2016 against Hong Kong.

In August 2018, he was named in Papua New Guinea's squad for Group A of the 2018–19 ICC World Twenty20 East Asia-Pacific Qualifier tournament. In March 2019, he was named in Papua New Guinea's squad for the Regional Finals of the 2018–19 ICC World Twenty20 East Asia-Pacific Qualifier tournament. The following month, he was named in Papua New Guinea's squad for the 2019 ICC World Cricket League Division Two tournament in Namibia.

He was in Papua New Guinea's squad for the 2019 ICC T20 World Cup Qualifier tournament in the United Arab Emirates.
