= Loa Nou =

Papua New Guinean cricketer (born 1987)

Personal information
- Born: 31 December 1987 (age 38); Port Moresby, Papua New Guinea
- Batting: Right-handed
- Bowling: Right-arm medium-fast
- Role: Bowler

Career statistics
Competition	T20I	FC	LA	T20
Matches	3	3	1	3
Runs scored	2	3	4	2
Batting average	–	3.00	–	–
100s/50s	0/0	0/0	0/0	0/0
Top score	2*	2*	4*	2*
Balls bowled	60	498	12	60
Wickets	1	12	0	1
Bowling average	65.00	25.08	–	65.00
5 wickets in innings	0	1	–	0
10 wickets in match	0	0	–	0
Best bowling	1/24	5/49	–	1/24
Catches/stumpings	0/–	1/–	0/–	0/–
- Source: Cricinfo, 20 April 2016

Loa Nou (born 31 December 1987) is a Papua New Guinean cricketer. A right-handed batsman and right-arm fast medium pace bowler, he has played for the Papua New Guinea national cricket team since 2007 and is the opening bowler for his country. He made his Twenty20 International debut against Ireland in the 2015 ICC World Twenty20 Qualifier tournament in July 2015.

== Biography ==
He was born in Port Moresby, Papua New Guinea to parents Nou and Hane Loa on 31 December 1987. Loa Nou first represented Papua New Guinea at Under-19 level, playing in the East Asia-Pacific Under-19 Championship 2007 as well as the 2008 Under-19 Cricket World Cup in Kuala Lumpur. He made his debut for the senior side at the 2007 ICC World Cricket League Division Three in Darwin, Australia.

Loa began playing cricket as a junior in the village Liklik Kricket Competition in 1998 at the age of 11 years. It was from here he began to gain recognition as a young force in the cricket competitions in Papua New Guinea. He continued his journey with cricket and it eventually brought him into the Under-19 Papua New Guinean team as a young fast bowler.

In 2007, he debuted in Division Three of the World Cricket League in Darwin against Fiji where he took 2 wickets. Later that year at the South Pacific Games, Loa played consistently by taking three wickets in each of PNG's victories and eventually the Papua New Guinea national cricket team played off for the gold medal against Fiji, Loa helped Papua New Guinea to a gold medal by taking 3/16. At the 2008 Under-19 World Cup he continued to play consistently and against West Indies, Loa bowled his best, picking up 4/63.

At the Under-19 World Cup in 2008, Loa was set as the 7th fastest bowler in the world for Under-19 and he is the fastest bowler in Papua New Guinea.

After a four-year exile from international cricket, Loa returned in the ICC Intercontinental Cup verse Netherlands where he took 5/49 in the first innings and finished with six wickets in the match. Nou played a key role in securing Papua New Guinea's victory in this inaugural match.
