= Willie Gavera =

Papua New Guinean cricketer (born 1988)

Personal information
- Full name: Willie Toua Gavera
- Born: 18 August 1988 (age 38); Papua New Guinea
- Batting: Right-handed
- Bowling: Right-arm fast

International information
- National side: Papua New Guinea

Career statistics
Competition	List A
Matches	4
Runs scored	10
Batting average	–
100s/50s	–/–
Top score	5*
Balls bowled	186
Wickets	6
Bowling average	21.00
5 wickets in innings	–
10 wickets in match	–
Best bowling	3/31
Catches/stumpings	–/–
- Source: Cricinfo, 22 May 2011

Willie Toua Gavera (born 18 August 1988) is a Papua New Guinean cricketer. Gavera is a right-handed batsman and fast bowler. He was born in Port Moresby.

Having played age-group cricket for Papua New Guinea Under-19s in the 2008 Under-19 World Cup, he was selected as part of the Papua New Guinea squad for the 2009 World Cricket League Division Three, where he played 5 matches. He played a single match in the 2011 World Cricket League Division Three, before making his List A debut against Bermuda in the 2011 World Cricket League Division Two. He played a further 3 List A matches in the competition, the last against Hong Kong. In his 4 matches, he took 6 wickets at a bowling average of 21.00, with best figures of 3/31.

He made his One Day International debut on 8 November 2014 against Hong Kong in Australia. He made his Twenty20 International debut for Papua New Guinea against Ireland in the 2015 ICC World Twenty20 Qualifier tournament on 15 July 2015.
