= Assad Vala =

Papua New Guinean cricketer

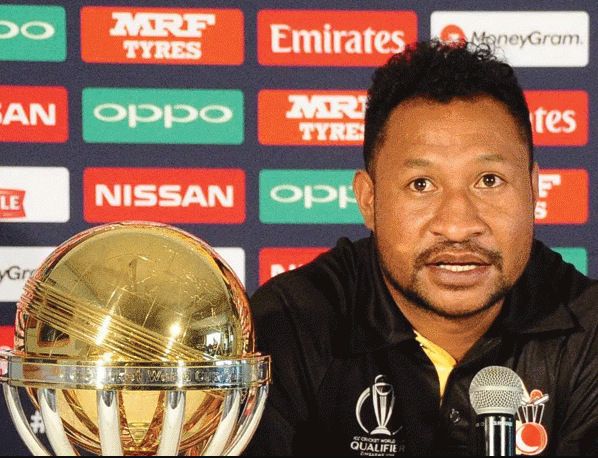
- Vala in 2021

Personal information
- Full name: Asadollah Vala
- Born: 5 August 1987 (age 39); Port Moresby, Papua New Guinea
- Batting: Left-handed
- Bowling: Right-arm off break
- Relatives: Pauke Siaka (wife)

International information
- National side: Papua New Guinea (2014-present)
- ODI debut (cap 10): 8 November 2014 v Hong Kong
- Last ODI: 5 April 2023 v Canada
- ODI shirt no.: 13
- T20I debut (cap 9): 15 July 2015 v Ireland
- Last T20I: 18 May 2026 v Japan

Career statistics
Competition	ODI	T20I	FC	LA
Matches	66	43	7	101
Runs scored	2,003	839	700	2,986
Batting average	30.81	23.97	63.63	30.78
100s/50s	1/12	0/6	3/3	2/18
Top score	104	93*	144*	105*
Balls bowled	2,388	389	341	2,702
Wickets	55	27	5	69
Bowling average	28.70	15.81	33.20	26.24
5 wickets in innings	0	0	0	0
10 wickets in match	0	0	0	0
Best bowling	3/17	3/7	2/80	3/17
Catches/stumpings	34/–	19/–	6/–	46/–
Medal record
Representing Papua New Guinea
Men's Cricket
Pacific Games
Gold medal – first place	2019 Apia	Twenty20 International
- Source: Cricinfo, 21 September 2023

Asadollah Vala (born 5 August 1987) is a Papua New Guinean cricketer and the captain of the national side. A left-handed batsman and off spin bowler, he has played for the Papua New Guinea national team since 2005.

== Early career ==
Born in Papua New Guinea in 1987, Assad Vala first represented Papua New Guinea at the under-19 level, playing in the 2004 Under-19 World Cup in Bangladesh. He made his debut for the senior side at the 2005 ICC Trophy in Ireland, where he played seven List A matches.

He returned to the under-19 level later in the year, playing in the Africa/East Asia-Pacific Under-19 Championship at Willowmoore Park in Benoni, South Africa. In 2006, he played for a combined East Asia Pacific team in the Australian National Country Cricket Championship, and did so again in 2007 and 2008.

In 2007, Vala played in Division Three of the World Cricket League in Darwin and represented his country at the 2007 South Pacific Games, where he won a gold medal in the cricket tournament.

== International career ==
He made his One Day International (ODI) debut on 8 November 2014 against Hong Kong in Australia. He made his Twenty20 International debut against Ireland in the 2015 ICC World Twenty20 Qualifier tournament on 15 July 2015.

In June 2015 on his first-class cricket debut, he scored a match-winning 124 not out against the Netherlands in the 2015–17 ICC Intercontinental Cup. He scored three hundreds in his first four matches, also making centuries against Ireland (120) and Namibia (144 not out).

In February 2018, the International Cricket Council (ICC) named Vala as one of the ten players to watch ahead of the 2018 Cricket World Cup Qualifier tournament. In June 2018, at the Papua New Guinea Cricket Awards he won the Tony Elly Medal for the best male player.

In August 2018, he was named as the captain of Papua New Guinea's squad for Group A of the 2018–19 ICC World Twenty20 East Asia-Pacific Qualifier tournament. He was the leading run-scorer in Group A of the tournament, with 294 runs in six matches. In March 2019, he was named as the captain of Papua New Guinea's squad for the Regional Finals of the 2018–19 ICC World Twenty20 East Asia-Pacific Qualifier tournament. The following month, he was named captain of Papua New Guinea's squad for the 2019 ICC World Cricket League Division Two tournament in Namibia.

In June 2019, he was selected to represent the Papua New Guinea cricket team in the men's tournament at the 2019 Pacific Games. In September 2019, Vala was named as the captain of Papua New Guinea's squad for the 2019 United States Tri-Nation Series. In the final match of the series, against Namibia, he scored his first ODI century, with 104 runs from 114 balls.

In September 2019, he was named as the captain of Papua New Guinea's squad for the 2019 ICC T20 World Cup Qualifier tournament in the United Arab Emirates. Ahead of the tournament, the ICC named him as the key player in Papua New Guinea's squad. He was the leading run-scorer for Papua New Guinea in the tournament, with 197 runs in eight matches.

In November 2020, Vala was nominated for the ICC Men's Associate Cricketer of the Decade award. In August 2021, Vala was named as the captain of Papua New Guinea's squad for the 2021 ICC Men's T20 World Cup.

In May 2024, he was named the captain in Papua New Guinea's squad for the 2024 ICC Men's T20 World Cup tournament.

== Personal life ==
Vala is married to Papua New Guinean women's national team cricketer Pauke Siaka.
