= Papua New Guinea national cricket team =

Men's cricket team

Papua New Guinea
- Nickname: Barramundis
- Association: Cricket PNG

Personnel
- Captain: Assad Vala
- Coach: Tim McCaskill

International Cricket Council
- ICC status: Associate Member (1973)
- ICC region: East Asia-Pacific
ICC Rankings	Current	Best-ever
ODI	---	16th (23 May 2019)
T20I	22nd	15th (9 Sep 2016)

One Day Internationals
- First ODI: v. Hong Kong at Tony Ireland Stadium, Townsville; 8 November 2014
- Last ODI: v. Canada at United Ground, Windhoek; 5 April 2023
ODIs	Played	Won/Lost
Total	66	14/51 (1 tie, 0 no results)
- World Cup Qualifier appearances: 10 (first in 1979)
- Best result: 3rd (1982)

T20 Internationals
- First T20I: v. Ireland at Stormont, Belfast; 15 July 2015
- Last T20I: v. Japan at Sano International Cricket Ground, Sano; 18 May 2026
T20Is	Played	Won/Lost
Total	74	41/32 (0 ties, 1 no result)
This year	6	5/1 (0 ties, 0 no results)
- T20 World Cup appearances: 2 (first in 2021)
- Best result: First round (2021, 2024)
- T20 World Cup Qualifier appearances: 5 (Note: For the 2024 and 2026 Men's T20 World Cups, the final round of qualification in East Asia-Pacific was the ICC East Asia-Pacific Regional Final.) (first in 2012)
- Best result: Champions (2023)
List A & T20I kit
- As of 26 May 2026

The Papua New Guinea men's national cricket team, nicknamed the Barramundis, represents Papua New Guinea in international cricket. The team is organised by Cricket PNG, which has been an associate member of the International Cricket Council (ICC) since 1973. Papua New Guinea first gained One-Day International (ODI) status by finishing fourth in the 2014 World Cup Qualifier. Papua New Guinea lost both their ODI and T20I status in March 2018 after losing a playoff match against Nepal during the 2018 Cricket World Cup Qualifier, a result that earned ODI and T20I status for their opponents. On 26 April 2019, Papua New Guinea defeated Oman to secure a top-four finish in the 2019 ICC World Cricket League Division Two and reclaim their ODI status.

Papua New Guinea again lost the ODI status in 2023 after a 117-run defeat against USA.

In April 2018, the ICC decided to grant full Twenty20 International (T20I) status to all its Members. Therefore, all Twenty20 matches played between Papua New Guinea and other ICC members since 1 January 2019 have the full T20I status.

== History ==
=== Beginnings ===
Cricket was introduced to the Territory of Papua by missionaries in the 1890s, and the local population soon took up the game. Matches were not always played to strict rules, with teams of more than fifty players a common occurrence. Cricket did not arrive in the Territory of New Guinea until Australia took over the administration of the territory under a United Nations mandate.

Cricket in rural areas tended to be played mostly by the indigenous population, whilst in urban areas such as Port Moresby the game was played mostly by the British and Australian expatriate population, and a competition for clubs in the city was started in 1937. A team of nine expatriate and two indigenous players played in Papua New Guinea's first international, against Australia in 1972.

Since its beginnings cricket was picked up naturally in the Motuan areas of Papua New Guinea, most recognisably the village of Hanuabada. Hanuabada village is located on the outer suburbs of Port Moresby, here cricket is played everyday from small children to their national stars, every afternoon the streets are flooded with boys playing cricket, this was also where the Liklik Kricket Competition was started in PNG. It may be for these reasons more than half of the PNG national cricket team is from Hanuabada village.

=== ICC Membership ===
Papua New Guinea became an associate member of the ICC in 1973, shortly before the country gained independence in 1975. The West Indies cricket team visited the country that year, beating the national side by four wickets. The team for that match contained six indigenous players, and from this point on, indigenous players began to dominate the national team.

They played in the first ICC Trophy in 1979, though they failed to progress beyond the first round. They won the gold medal at the first South Pacific Games cricket tournament later in the year and have won the gold medal every time since. After a tour of Australia in 1981, Papua New Guinea had their best international performance in the 1982 ICC Trophy where they finished third after beating Bangladesh in a play-off.

Papua New Guinea again failed to progress beyond the first round at the 1986 ICC Trophy, though they did record the highest total in the tournament's history in their match against Gibraltar. They bounced back to win the gold medal at the South Pacific Games in New Caledonia the following year. They reached the second round of the 1990 ICC Trophy in the Netherlands and the gold medal when they hosted the South Pacific Games in 1991.

They reached the plate final of the 1994 ICC Trophy, but did not play the match as they had already booked a flight home, not expecting to qualify. This has been an occasional problem for Papua New Guinea, as flights to and from the country are infrequent. They also left the 1998 ACC Trophy in Nepal early after losing their first two games, forfeiting their match against the Maldives as otherwise they would have had to have waited more than a week for the next flight. This has also meant they have rarely played overseas outside of official tournaments, the only exceptions being a visit to Fiji in 1977, a tour of Hong Kong in the early 1980s and the aforementioned tour of Australia.

=== Modern era ===
Another international outlet for Papua New Guinea team opened up in 1996 when they participated in the first ACC Trophy in Kuala Lumpur. They reached the semi-final, where they lost to Bangladesh. They played in the tournament again in 1998, but left the tournament early. They have not played in the tournament since due to the establishment of the ICC's East Asia/Pacific development region. Between the two ACC Trophy tournaments, Papua New Guinea finished 13th in the 1997 ICC Trophy. They failed to progress beyond the first round of the 2001 tournament in Ontario. They finished third in the 2001 Pacifica Cup and won the same event in 2002, beating Tonga in the final.

They again won the gold medal at cricket tournament of the 2003 South Pacific Games, and in 2005 played in the repêchage tournament of the 2005 ICC Trophy. They won the tournament, beating regional rivals Fiji in the final. This qualified them for the 2005 ICC Trophy, where they finished 11th. In 2007, Papua New Guinea played in Division Three of the World Cricket League in Darwin where they finished third. They played in the cricket tournament of the 2007 South Pacific Games, where they again won the gold medal.

In late January 2009, Papua New Guinea travelled to Buenos Aires to take part in Division Three of the World Cricket League where they played Argentina, the Cayman Islands, Uganda and the top two teams from Division Four in 2008. A top-two finish in this tournament would have qualified them for the 2009 ICC World Cup Qualifier in South Africa later in 2009, from which they could have qualified for the 2011 World Cup. Papua New Guinea narrowly missed qualification, ending up in third place behind Afghanistan and Uganda.

It was third time lucky for Papua New Guinea when they contested Division Three of the World Cricket League in January 2011. Winning their first 4 matches of the tournament, they had assured themselves a top-two finish, before losing the final round robin match and then the final, both against Hong Kong.

In April 2011, Papua New Guinea took part in Division Two of the World Cricket League, held in the United Arab Emirates and came third, thus qualifying for the 2014 Cricket World Cup Qualifier in New Zealand.

In February 2013, Papua New Guinea travelled to Auckland, New Zealand, for the EAP Championship and went through the group stages unbeaten before defeating Vanuatu in the final. As a result, they participated in the 2013 ICC World Twenty20 Qualifier in the UAE in October.

=== ODI and T20I status ===
Papua New Guinea finished 4th in the final qualifying tournament for the 2015 ICC Cricket World Cup, in New Zealand in 2014. While missing out on qualification for the World Cup, their final position allowed them to gain One Day International (ODI) status for the first time. By having ODI status, the International Cricket Council (ICC) also granted Papua New Guinea Twenty20 International (T20I) status.

The team played their first ODI match in a two-match series against Hong Kong in Australia in November 2014.

8 November 2014
Scorecard

Hong Kong; 202 (48.3)	v	Papua New Guinea; 203/6 (40 overs)
Jamie Atkinson 59 (79); Assad Vala 2/17 (5 overs)		Charles Amini 61* (67); Irfan Ahmed 3/51 (8 overs)

Papua New Guinea won by 4 wickets
Tony Ireland Stadium, Townsville
Umpires: Phil Jones (NZ) and Paul Wilson (Aus)

- Hong Kong won the toss and chose to bat.
- First ever ODI match for Papua New Guinea.

They won the first by 4 wickets, the second by 3 wickets. As on date (November-2016), they are the only country that has won its first two ODIs.

Papua New Guinea's first scheduled T20I match was against Hong Kong on 13 July 2015 at the 2015 ICC World Twenty20 Qualifier. However the match was abandoned without a ball bowled due to rain, with no toss taking place. They played their first full match two days later, against Ireland, beating them by 2 wickets. With their victory against Nepal on 17 July, they became the first team to qualify for the play-off section of the tournament.

In April 2018, the ICC decided to grant full Twenty20 International (T20I) status to all its members. Therefore, all Twenty20 matches played between Papua New Guinea and other ICC members since 1 January 2019 have the full T20I status.

Papua New Guinea crashed out early from the race of qualification for the 2016 ICC World Twenty20 slated to be held in India. They finished eighth during the ICC World Twenty20 Qualifier in Ireland and Scotland.

In September 2017, then team coach Jason Gillespie suggested that Papua New Guinea should be added to the Australian domestic limited-overs cricket tournament.

Papua New Guinea qualified for 2021 ICC Men's T20 World Cup to be held in India.

On the 30th of March 2021, it was announced that Carl Sandri was to be the new national coach and high performance manager for all three national squads and will oversee the high performance department and the development of talent in PNG.

Papua New Guinea won the 2022–23 ICC Men's T20 World Cup East Asia-Pacific Qualifier, defeating the Japan national cricket team in the final. Subsequently, Papua New Guinea qualified for the 2024 ICC Men's T20 World Cup that was co-hosted by the United States and the West Indies. They were drawn in group C, along with Uganda, New Zealand, Afghanistan and West Indies. They crashed out after losing every game, ending the tournament with a net run rate of -1.268.

== Papua New Guinea Cricket Board ==
Papua New Guinea Cricket Board is the official governing body of the sport of cricket in Papua New Guinea. Its current headquarters is in Port Moresby, Papua New Guinea. Papua New Guinea Cricket Board is Papua New Guinea's representative at the International Cricket Council and is an associate member and has been a member of that body since 1973. It is also a member of the East Asia-Pacific Cricket Council.

== Home ground ==
Locations of all stadiums which have hosted international cricket matches within Papua New Guinea

=== Amini Park ===
Amini Park is a cricket ground in Port Moresby, Papua New Guinea. The ground -- named after the Amini family, several of whose members have played cricket for Papua New Guinea -- has seen the men's team play Australia, the West Indies and Victoria.

The women's team played Japan in a three match series at the ground in September 2006.

== Current squad ==
This lists all the players who have played for Papua New Guinea in the past 12 months or has been part of the latest ODI or T20I squad. Updated as of 5 April 2023.

Name	Age	Batting style	Bowling style	Forms	Notes
Batters
Sese Bau	34	Left-handed	Right-arm medium	ODI & T20I	
Tony Ura	37	Right-handed		ODI & T20I	
Lega Siaka	33	Right-handed	Right-arm leg break	ODI & T20I	
Hiri Hiri	31	Right-handed	Right-arm off break	ODI	
Gaudi Toka	32	Left-handed	Right-arm medium	ODI	
All-rounders
Assad Vala	39	Right-handed	Right-arm off break	ODI & T20I	Captain
Norman Vanua	32	Right-handed	Right-arm medium	ODI & T20I	
Charles Amini	34	Left-handed	Right-arm leg break	ODI & T20I	Vice-captain
Chad Soper	34	Right-handed	Right-arm medium	ODI & T20I	
Simon Atai	27	Left-handed	Slow left-arm orthodox	T20I	Also wicket-keeper
Wicket-keepers
Kiplin Doriga	31	Right-handed		ODI	
Hila Vare	25	Left-handed		T20I	
Spin Bowler
John Kariko	22	Left-handed	Slow left-arm orthodox	ODI	
Pace Bowlers
Riley Hekure	31	Right-handed	Right-arm medium	ODI & T20I	
Semo Kamea	25	Left-handed	Left-arm fast	ODI & T20I	
Kabua Morea	33	Right-handed	Left-arm medium	ODI & T20I	
Alei Nao	32	Right-handed	Right-arm medium	ODI & T20I	
Damien Ravu	32	Right-handed	Right-arm medium	T20I	

== Coaching staff ==
Position	Name
Team manager	
Head coach	Tatenda Taibu
Batting coach	Mahuru Dai
Bowling coach	Willie Gavera
Fielding coach	Vani Morea
Physiotherapist	Loa Nou
Strength and conditioning coach	John Reva
Analyst	Jack Vare
Specialist coach / Consultant	Phil Simmons

=== Coaching history ===
- c. 2007: (Papua New Guinea) Api Leka
- 2009: (Australia) Martin Gleeson
- 2010–2011: (Australia) Andy Bichel
- 2011: (Papua New Guinea) Rarua Dikana (interim)
- 2011–2012: (Australia) Brad Hogg
- 2012-2014: (Australia) Peter Anderson
- 2014: (Papua New Guinea) Rarua Dikana (interim)
- 2014–2017: (New Zealand) Dipak Patel
- 2017: (Australia) Jason Gillespie (interim)
- 2018–2021: (Australia) Joe Dawes
- 2021–2022: (Italy) Carl Sandri
- 2022-2023: (New Zealand) Mark Coles (interim)
- 2023-2024: (Australia) Nathan Reardon
- 2024-present: (Zimbabwe) Tatenda Taibu

== Tournament history ==
Legend

- Champions
- Runners-up
- Third place/Semi-finals
- Hosts
- Q Qualified/Advanced to next stage
- DNQ Did not qualify
- ▲ Promoted
- Remained in the same division
- ▼ Relegated

=== Cricket World Cup ===
Cricket World Cup record								Qualification record				
Year	Round	Position	Pld	W	L	T	NR	Pld	W	L	T	NR
(England) 1975	Not invited							No qualifiers held				
(England) 1979	Did not qualify							4	1	1	0	2
(England) (Wales) 1983	Did not qualify							9	6	2	0	1
(India) (Pakistan) 1987	Did not qualify							8	4	4	0	0
(Australia) (New Zealand) 1992	Did not qualify							7	4	3	0	0
(Pakistan) (India) (Sri Lanka) 1996	Did not qualify							7	5	2	0	0
(England) (Wales) (Scotland) (Republic of Ireland) (Netherlands) 1999	Did not qualify							6	3	3	0	0
(South Africa) (Zimbabwe) (Kenya) 2003	Did not qualify							5	1	4	0	0
(Cricket West Indies) 2007	Did not qualify							12	7	5	0	0
(India) (Sri Lanka) (Bangladesh) 2011	Did not qualify							9	7	2	0	0
(Australia) (New Zealand) 2015	Did not qualify							21	13	8	0	0
(England) (Wales) 2019	Did not qualify							20	9	11	0	0
(India) 2023	Did not qualify							41	5	35	1	0
(South Africa) (Zimbabwe) (Namibia) 2027	Did not qualify							15	5	8	0	2
Total	—N/a	0/14	–	–	–	–	–	164	70	88	1	5

=== Cricket World Cup Qualifier ===
Cricket World Cup Qualifier record
Year	Round	Position	Pld	W	L	T	NR	Qual.
(England) 1979	Group stage	9/15	4	1	1	0	2	DNQ
(England) 1982	Third place	3/16	9	5	3	0	1	DNQ
(England) 1986	Group stage	7/16	8	4	4	0	0	DNQ
(Netherlands) 1990	Second round	7/17	7	4	3	0	0	DNQ
(Kenya) 1994	Plate round	10/20	7	5	2	0	0	DNQ
(Malaysia) 1997	Play-offs	13/22	6	3	3	0	0	DNQ
(Canada) 2001	Division One	12/22	5	1	4	0	0	DNQ
(Ireland) 2005	Play-offs	11/12	7	2	5	0	0	DNQ
(South Africa) 2009	Did not qualify							
(New Zealand) 2014	Super Six	4/10	9	5	4	0	0	DNQ
(Zimbabwe) 2018	Play-offs	9/10	6	1	5	0	0	DNQ
(Zimbabwe) 2023	Did not qualify							
(Namibia) (South Africa) 2027	Did not qualify							
Total	0 Titles	10/13	68	31	34	0	3	—N/a

=== CWC League 2 ===
Cricket World Cup League 2 record
Year	Position	Pld	W	L	T	NR	P/R
2019–2023	7/7	36	5	30	0	1	▼
2024–2026	Part of Challenge League						
Total	0 Titles (1/2)	36	5	30	0	1	—N/a

=== CWC Challenge League ===
Cricket World Cup Challenge League record
Year	Round	League	Position	Pld	W	L	T	NR	P/R
2019–2022	Part of League 2								
2024–2026	A	League stage	4/6	15	5	8	0	2	▼
Total		0 Titles	1/2	15	5	8	0	2	—N/a

=== Men's T20 World Cup ===
Men's T20 World Cup record								Qualification record				
Year	Round	Position	Pld	W	L	T	NR	Pld	W	L	T	NR
(South Africa) 2007	Not eligible							Not eligible				
(England) 2009	Not eligible							Not eligible				
(Cricket West Indies) 2010	Not eligible							Not eligible				
(Sri Lanka) 2012	Did not qualify							15	10	5	0	0
(Bangladesh) 2014	Did not qualify							17	11	5	0	1
(India) 2016	Did not qualify							14	10	3	0	1
(United Arab Emirates) (Oman) 2021	First round	16/16	3	0	3	0	0	18	15	2	0	1
(Australia) 2022	Did not qualify							5	2	3	0	0
(United States) (Cricket West Indies) 2024	Group stage	19/20	4	0	4	0	0	6	6	0	0	0
(India) (Sri Lanka) 2026	Did not qualify							2	0	2	0	0
(Australia) (New Zealand) 2028	To be determined							7*	6	1	0	0
Total	0 Titles	2/10	7	0	7	0	0	84	60	21	0	3

=== T20 World Cup Global Qualifier ===
Men's T20 World Cup Global Qualifier record
Year	Round	Position	Pld	W	L	T	NR	Qual.
(Ireland) 2008	Not eligible							
(United Arab Emirates) 2010	Not eligible							
(United Arab Emirates) 2012	Play-offs	8/16	9	4	5	0	0	DNQ
(United Arab Emirates) 2013	Play-offs	8/16	10	4	5	0	1	DNQ
(Ireland) (Scotland) 2015	Play-offs	8/14	7	3	3	0	1	DNQ
(United Arab Emirates) 2019	Runners-up	2/14	8	6	2	0	0	Q
(Zimbabwe) 2022	Third place	3/8	5	2	3	0	0	DNQ
(To be determined) 2028	To be determined							
Total	0 Titles	5/8	39	19	18	0	2	—N/a

=== T20 World Cup EAP Regional Final ===
T20 World Cup EAP Regional Final record
Year	Round	Position	Pld	W	L	T	NR	Qual.
(Papua New Guinea) 2019	Champions	1/3	4	3	0	0	1	Q
(Japan) 2023	Tournament cancelled							
(Papua New Guinea) 2023	Champions	1/4	6	6	0	0	0	Q
(Oman) 2025	Group stage	8/9	2	0	2	0	0	DNQ
(To be determined) 2027	Qualified							
Total	2 Titles	5/5	12	9	2	0	1	—N/a

=== Pacific Games ===
Pacific Games record
Year	Round	Position	Pld	W	L	T	NR
(New Caledonia) 1987	Gold medal	1/5	Records not available				
(Fiji) 1979	Gold medal	1/7	Records not available				
(Papua New Guinea) 1991	Gold medal	1/5	Records not available				
(Fiji) 2003	Gold medal	1/6	6	6	0	0	0
(Samoa) 2007	Gold medal	1/5	4	4	0	0	0
(New Caledonia) 2011	Gold medal	1/4	3	3	0	0	0
(Papua New Guinea) 2015	Silver medal	2/4	8	5	3	0	0
(Samoa) 2019	Gold medal	1/4	7	7	0	0	0
Total	7 Titles	8/8	28	25	3	0	0

=== Other international tournaments ===
CWC Qualifier Play-off (ODI)	ICC Intercontinental Cup (FC)	World Cricket League (LA/ODI/50 overs)
2023: 6th place	2015–17: 7th place	2007 (Division Three): 3rd place; 2009 (Division Three): 3rd place; 2011 (Division Three): 2nd place (▲); 2011 (Division Two): 3rd place; 2019 (Division Two): 3rd place

=== Other regional tournaments ===
T20WC EAP Sub-regional Qualifiers (T20I)	EAP Trophy (OD/T20)
2018: Winners (Q); 2026: Winners (Q)	2009: Winners; 2009 (T20): Winners; 2011 (T20): Winners; 2013 (T20): Winners; 2014 (T20): Winners
Pacifica Cup (OD)	ACC Trophy (OD)
2001: 3rd place; 2002: Winners	1996: Semi-finals; 1998: First round

== Records and statistics of international matches ==
International match summary – Papua New Guinea

Playing record
Format	M	W	L	T	NR	Inaugural match
One-Day Internationals	66	14	51	1	0	8 November 2014
Twenty20 Internationals	74	41	32	0	1	15 July 2015

Last updated 18 May 2026

=== One-Day Internationals ===
- Highest team total: 333 v. Namibia, 29 March 2023 at United Ground, Windhoek
- Highest individual score: 151, Tony Ura v. Ireland, 6 March 2018 at Harare Sports Club, Harare
- Best individual bowling figures: 6/41, Chad Soper v. Hong Kong, 6 November 2016 at Mission Road Ground, Mong Kok

Most ODI runs for Papua New Guinea

Player	Runs	Average	Career span
Assad Vala	2,003	30.81	2014–2023
Tony Ura	1,363	22.71	2014–2023
Charles Amini	1,128	23.50	2014–2023
Sese Bau	1,089	20.16	2016–2023
Lega Siaka	931	19.80	2014–2022

Most ODI wickets for Papua New Guinea

Player	Wickets	Average	Career span
Chad Soper	70	28.35	2016–2023
Norman Vanua	61	34.18	2014–2023
Assad Vala	55	28.70	2014–2023
Semo Kamea	33	26.30	2016–2023
Charles Amini	32	43.06	2014–2023

ODI record versus other nations

Records complete to ODI #4567. Last updated 5 April 2023.

Opponent	M	W	L	T	NR	First match	First win
v. Full Members
Ireland	1	0	1	0	0	6 March 2018	
West Indies	1	0	1	0	0	8 March 2018	
v. Associate Members
Canada	1	0	1	0	0	5 April 2023	
Hong Kong	8	4	4	0	0	8 November 2014	8 November 2014
Jersey	1	0	1	0	0	1 April 2023	
Namibia	7	0	7	0	0	22 September 2019	
Nepal	10	2	8	0	0	7 September 2021	25 March 2022
Oman	6	0	6	0	0	14 August 2019	
Scotland	10	1	9	0	0	6 October 2017	8 October 2017
United Arab Emirates	11	5	6	0	0	31 March 2017	2 April 2017
United States	10	2	7	1	0	27 April 2019	27 April 2019

=== Twenty20 Internationals ===
- Highest team total: 229/6 v. Philippines, 28 July 2023 at Amini Park, Port Moresby
- Highest individual score: 107*, Tony Ura v. Philippines, 23 March 2019 at Amini Park, Port Moresby
- Best innings bowling: 5/15, Damien Ravu v. Vanuatu, on 9 July 2019 at Faleata Oval No 3, Apia.

Most T20I runs for Papua New Guinea

Player	Runs	Average	Career span
Tony Ura	1,900	33.92	2015–2026
Assad Vala	1,447	24.94	2015–2026
Sese Bau	1,200	24.00	2015–2026
Charles Amini	1,028	24.47	2015–2024
Lega Siaka	1,019	17.87	2015–2026

Most T20I wickets for Papua New Guinea

Player	Wickets	Average	Career span
Norman Vanua	66	19.01	2015–2024
Charles Amini	47	19.27	2015–2024
Assad Vala	44	15.47	2015–2026
Kabua Morea	38	16.50	2021–2026
John Kariko	37	13.75	2023–2026

T20I record versus other nations

Records complete to T20I #3883. Last updated 18 May 2026.

Opposition	M	W	L	T	NR	First Match	First Win
v. Full Members
Afghanistan	2	0	2	0	0	23 July 2015	
Bangladesh	1	0	1	0	0	21 October 2021	
Ireland	4	2	2	0	0	15 July 2015	15 July 2015
New Zealand	1	0	1	0	0	17 June 2024	
West Indies	1	0	1	0	0	2 June 2024	
Zimbabwe	1	0	1	0	0	15 July 2022	
v. Associate Members
Bermuda	1	1	0	0	0	19 October 2019	19 October 2019
Cook Islands	1	1	0	0	0	10 May 2026	10 May 2026
Guernsey	1	1	0	0	0	14 August 2025	14 August 2025
Hong Kong	4	3	1	0	0	14 July 2022	22 September 2023
Indonesia	1	1	0	0	0	14 May 2026	14 May 2026
Japan	3	2	1	0	0	25 July 2023	25 July 2023
Kenya	1	1	0	0	0	27 October 2019	27 October 2019
Malaysia	6	4	2	0	0	29 March 2022	1 April 2022
Namibia	3	2	1	0	0	20 October 2019	20 October 2019
Nepal	6	2	4	0	0	17 July 2015	17 July 2015
Netherlands	3	1	2	0	0	24 October 2019	24 October 2019
Oman	5	1	4	0	0	17 October 2021	7 March 2024
Philippines	4	3	0	0	1	22 March 2019	22 March 2019
Samoa	4	3	1	0	0	8 July 2019	8 July 2019
Scotland	3	0	3	0	0	21 October 2019	
Singapore	3	2	1	0	0	25 October 2019	25 October 2019
South Korea	1	1	0	0	0	9 May 2026	9 May 2026
Uganda	2	1	1	0	0	12 July 2022	12 July 2022
United Arab Emirates	3	0	3	0	0	12 April 2017	
United States	1	1	0	0	0	17 July 2022	17 July 2022
Vanuatu	8	8	0	0	0	22 March 2019	22 March 2019

== Other records and statistics ==
=== First-class matches ===
- Most first-class runs: Assad Vala 559
- Most first-class wickets: Norman Vanua 16
- Highest individual score: Assad Vala 144* v. Namibia, 16–19 October 2016
- Highest team score: 311 v. Namibia, 16–19 October 2016
- Best bowling (innings): Loa Nou 5/49 v. Netherlands, 16–18 June 2015
- Best bowling (match): Lega Siaka 7/54 v. Namibia, 16–19 October 2016

=== ICC Trophy ===
- Highest team total: 455/9 v. Gibraltar, 18 June 1986 (Tournament record)
- Highest individual score: 162 by T Souter v. Israel, 20 June 1986
- Best innings bowling: 5/12 by W Maha v. Gibraltar, 18 June 1986

=== Overall ===
- Highest team total: 572/7 v. New Caledonia, 31 August 2007 (world record)
- Highest individual score: 162 by B Harry v. Israel, 20 June 1986
- Best innings bowling: 8/27 by Mea Steven v. New Hebrides, 1979

== See also ==
- Papua New Guinea national women's cricket team
- Papua New Guinea Under-19 cricket team
- Papua New Guinea ODI cricketers
- Papua New Guinea T20I cricketers
