= Norman Vanua =

Papua New Guinean cricketer

Personal information
- Born: 2 December 1993 (age 32); Port Moresby, Papua New Guinea
- Batting: Right-handed
- Bowling: Right-arm medium
- Role: All-rounder

International information
- National side: Papua New Guinea (2014-present)
- ODI debut (cap 12): 9 November 2014 v Hong Kong
- Last ODI: 15 March 2023 v United Arab Emirates
- T20I debut (cap 10): 15 July 2015 v Ireland
- Last T20I: 23 July 2023 v Philippines

Career statistics
Competition	ODI	T20I	FC	LA
Matches	25	25	7	39
Runs scored	296	321	102	323
Batting average	15.57	22.92	8.50	12.42
100s/50s	0/0	0/1	0/1	0/0
Top score	35	54	64	35
Balls bowled	1,117	490	1,084	1,753
Wickets	36	35	20	57
Bowling average	26.36	14.42	34.40	26.35
5 wickets in innings	0	1	1	0
10 wickets in match	0	0	0	0
Best bowling	4/24	5/17	5/59	4/24
Catches/stumpings	8/–	8/–	2/–	8/–
Medal record
Representing Papua New Guinea
Men's Cricket
Pacific Games
Gold medal – first place	2019 Apia	Twenty20 International
- Source: Cricinfo, 23 July 2023

Norman Vanua (born 2 December 1993) is a Papua New Guinean cricketer. Vanua made his One Day International debut on 9 November 2014 against Hong Kong in Australia. He made his Twenty20 International debut against Ireland in the 2015 ICC World Twenty20 Qualifier tournament on 15 July 2015.

In August 2018, he was named in Papua New Guinea's squad for Group A of the 2018–19 ICC World Twenty20 East Asia-Pacific Qualifier tournament. In March 2019, he was named in Papua New Guinea's squad for the Regional Finals of the 2018–19 ICC World Twenty20 East Asia-Pacific Qualifier tournament. The following month, he was named in Papua New Guinea's squad for the 2019 ICC World Cricket League Division Two tournament in Namibia.

In June 2019, he was selected to represent the Papua New Guinea cricket team in the men's tournament at the 2019 Pacific Games. He was in Papua New Guinea's squad for the 2019 ICC T20 World Cup Qualifier tournament in the United Arab Emirates. In Papua New Guinea's opening match of the tournament, against Bermuda, Vanua took a hat-trick.

In August 2021, Vanua was named in Papua New Guinea's squad for the 2021 ICC Men's T20 World Cup.

Vanua lives in Canberra, Australian Capital Territory. He is an ICC Level 2 cricket coach and plays First Grade club cricket for Western Creek Molonglo Cricket Club between national duties. He is married to Kristie Vanua-Brown and has two children.

In May 2024, he was named in Papua New Guinea’s squad for the 2024 ICC Men's T20 World Cup tournament.
