= Tony Ura =

Papua New Guinean cricketer

Personal information
- Full name: Tony Pala Ura
- Born: 15 October 1989 (age 37); Papua New Guinea
- Batting: Right-handed
- Role: Opening batsman, wicketkeeper

International information
- National side: Papua New Guinea (2014-present)
- ODI debut (cap 9): 8 November 2014 v Hong Kong
- Last ODI: 5 March 2023 v United Arab Emirates
- T20I debut (cap 8): 15 July 2015 v Ireland
- Last T20I: 23 July 2023 v Philippines

Career statistics
Competition	ODI	T20I	FC	LA
Matches	30	23	6	52
Runs scored	753	671	303	1,102
Batting average	25.10	37.27	25.25	21.19
100s/50s	1/2	1/4	0/2	1/4
Top score	151	107*	75	151
Catches/stumpings	13/–	7/–	6/–	17/–
Medal record
Representing Papua New Guinea
Men's Cricket
Pacific Games
Gold medal – first place	2019 Apia	Twenty20 International
- Source: Cricinfo, 23 July 2023

Tony Ura (born 15 October 1989) is a Papua New Guinean cricketer. Ura is a right-handed opening batsman.

== International career ==
Having played age-group cricket for Papua New Guinea Under-19s in the 2008 Under-19 World Cup and 2010 Under-19 World Cup, he was selected in the Papua New Guinea squad for the 2011 World Cricket League Division Three, where he played 6 matches, helping them earn promotion to 2011 World Cricket League Division Two. It was in this competition that he made his List A debut against Bermuda. He played a further 5 List A matches in the competition, the last coming against Hong Kong. In his 6 matches in the competition, he scored 92 runs at a batting average of 15.33, with a high score of 52. HIs half century came against Bermuda.

Ura made his One Day International debut on 8 November 2014 against Hong Kong in Australia. He made his Twenty20 International debut against Ireland in the 2015 ICC World Twenty20 Qualifier tournament on 15 July 2015.

In the 2018 Cricket World Cup Qualifier, Ura scored a national record 151 runs from 142 balls against Ireland. He was named player of the match despite his team losing. In the next match against West Indies, the inaugural ODI between the two teams, he scored 37 runs from 45 balls, hitting two sixes off the bowling of Ashley Nurse. Following the conclusion of the Cricket World Cup Qualifier tournament, the International Cricket Council (ICC) named Ura as the rising star of Papua New Guinea's squad.

In August 2018, he was named in Papua New Guinea's squad for Group A of the 2018–19 ICC T20 World Cup East Asia-Pacific Qualifier tournament. In Papua New Guinea's opening match of the qualifier, against Samoa, Ura scored 120 runs from 55 balls. In March 2019, he was named in Papua New Guinea's squad for the Regional Finals of the 2018–19 ICC T20 World Cup East Asia-Pacific Qualifier tournament. On 23 March 2019, during Papua New Guinea's match against the Philippines, Ura became the first batsman for Papua New Guinea to score a century in a T20I match, scoring 107 not out. He was the leading run-scorer in the tournament, with 243 runs in four matches. The following month, he was named in Papua New Guinea's squad for the 2019 ICC World Cricket League Division Two tournament in Namibia.

In June 2019, he was selected to represent the Papua New Guinea cricket team in the men's tournament at the 2019 Pacific Games. In September 2019, he was named in Papua New Guinea's squad for the 2019 ICC T20 World Cup Qualifier tournament in the United Arab Emirates. In August 2021, Ura was named in Papua New Guinea's squad for the 2021 ICC Men's T20 World Cup.

In May 2024, he was named in Papua New Guinea's squad for the 2024 ICC Men's T20 World Cup tournament.
