= Lega Siaka =

Papua New Guinean cricketer

Personal information
- Full name: Lega Siaka
- Born: 21 December 1992 (age 33); Port Moresby, Papua New Guinea
- Batting: Right-handed
- Bowling: Right-arm leg break
- Role: Batsman

International information
- National side: Papua New Guinea (2014-present)
- ODI debut (cap 8): 8 November 2014 v Hong Kong
- Last ODI: 25 November 2022 v USA
- T20I debut (cap 7): 15 July 2015 v Ireland
- Last T20I: 18 May 2026 v Japan

Domestic team information
- Years: Team
- 2014/15: Melbourne Renegades

Career statistics
Competition	ODI	T20I	FC	LA
Matches	25	26	7	46
Runs scored	471	296	425	991
Batting average	18.84	14.80	32.69	22.52
100s/50s	1/1	0/0	1/1	3/3
Top score	109	31	142*	112*
Balls bowled	204	72	357	264
Wickets	3	9	9	3
Bowling average	48.66	6.22	24.66	72.66
5 wickets in innings	0	0	0	0
10 wickets in match	0	0	0	0
Best bowling	2/33	3/16	4/38	2/33
Catches/stumpings	8/–	20/–	8/–	19/–
- Source: ESPNcricinfo, 21 September 2023

Lega Siaka (born 21 December 1992) is a Papua New Guinean cricketer, who plays for the national team mainly as a right-handed batsman.

== International career ==
Siaka made his One Day International (ODI) debut on 8 November 2014 against Hong Kong in Australia. He made his Twenty20 International (T20I) debut against Ireland in the 2015 ICC World Twenty20 Qualifier tournament on 15 July 2015.

In November 2014, he became the first player from Papua New Guinea to score an ODI century.

In April 2017, he scored his maiden first-class century, in round five of the 2015–17 ICC Intercontinental Cup against the United Arab Emirates.

In August 2018, his name was included in Papua New Guinea's squad for Group A of the 2018–19 ICC World Twenty20 East Asia-Pacific Qualifier tournament. He was in Papua New Guinea's squad for the Regional Finals of the 2018–19 ICC World Twenty20 East Asia-Pacific Qualifier tournament. He was the leading wicket-taker in the tournament, with seven dismissals in four matches. The following month, he was named in Papua New Guinea's squad for the 2019 ICC World Cricket League Division Two tournament in Namibia.

In June 2019, he was selected in the national cricket team for the men's tournament at the 2019 Pacific Games, and in September 2019, in the national squad for the 2019 ICC T20 World Cup Qualifier tournament in the United Arab Emirates. In August 2021, Siaka was named in Papua New Guinea's squad for the 2021 ICC Men's T20 World Cup.

In May 2024, he was named in Papua New Guinea’s squad for the 2024 ICC Men's T20 World Cup tournament.
