= Cricket at the 2023 SEA Games – Men's tournament =

The men's cricket tournament at the 2023 SEA Games in Cambodia took place at the AZ Group Cricket Oval in Phnom Penh. The 2023 Games featured 4 medal events each for men's and women's cricket (6s, T10, T20 and 50 overs).

During the Games, the Malaysia Cricket Association complained about the organisation of the events, particularly the unseeded group stages and the lack of semi-finals, and questioned the eligibility of 13 members of Cambodia's squad, and the appearance of Pakistani- born and Indian-born cricketers playing for the hosts. Cambodia claimed they were naturalised citizens.

== Squads ==
Cambodia	Indonesia	Malaysia	Philippines	Singapore	Thailand
Luqman Butt (c); Etienne Beukes; Phon Bunthean; Mahaj Chadha (wk); Gulam Chughtai; Sharwan Godara; Lakshit Gupta; Uday Hathinjar; Utkarsh Jain; Anish Prasad (wk); Chanthoeun Rathanak; Te Senglong; Ram Sharan; Salvin Stanly; Pel Vannak	Kadek Gamantika (c); Muhammad Afis; Gede Arta; Ketut Artawan; Ferdinando Banunaek; Kadek Darmawan (wk); Danilson Hawoe; Maxi Koda; Muhaddis; Ketut Pastika; Gede Prastama; Gema Pramanda; Gede Priandana; Ahmad Ramdoni (wk); Anjar Tadarus	Ahmad Faiz (c); Virandeep Singh (vc, wk); Muhammad Amir; Wan Azam (wk); Syed Aziz; Syazrul Idrus; Aslam Khan; Sharvin Muniandy; Nazril Rahman; Fitri Sham; Pavandeep Singh; Muhamad Syahadat; Vijay Unni; Muhammad Wafiq; Zubaidi Zulkifle	Daniel Smith (c); Jordan Alegre; Josef Doctora; Richard Goodwin; Jonathan Hill; Ryan Hutton; Hern Isorena; Haider Kiani; Kepler Lukies; Robert Mitchell; Miggy Podosky; Grant Russ (wk); Amanpreet Sirah; Neil Smith; Henry Tyler	Rezza Gaznavi (c); Aahan Gopinath Achar; Abdul Rahman Bhadelia; Adwitya Bhargava; Mahiyu Bhatia; Aman Desai (wk); Avi Dixit; Anantha Krishna; Amjad Mahboob; Anish Paraam; Navin Param; Utsav Rakshit; Rohan Rangarajan; Raoul Sharma; Venkatesan Thiyanesh	Nopphon Senamontree (c); Chaloemwong Chatphaisan (wk); Sorawat Desungnoen; Sittipong Hongsi; Chiraphong Liangwichian; Khanitson Namchaikul; Narawit Nuntarach; Chanchai Pengkumta; Satarut Rungrueang; Yodsak Saranonnakkun; Kamron Senamontree; Vichanath Singh; Phiriyapong Suanchuai (wk); Kiatiwut Suttisan; Sirawit Takanta

== 6s ==
Pos	Team	Pld	W	L	D	NR	NRR	Pts	Final result
1	Singapore	3	2	1	0	0	2.000	4	Gold medal
2	Cambodia	3	2	1	0	0	0.887	4	Silver medal
3	Indonesia	3	1	2	0	0	–2.089	2	Bronze medal
4	Philippines	3	1	2	0	0	–0.722	2	Eliminated

13 May 2023
07:50

Indonesia; 62/1 (6 overs)	v	Cambodia; 63/0 (4.1 overs)
Kadek Gamantika 37 (18); Mahaj Chadha 1/2 (1 over)		Mahaj Chadha 54* (17)

Cambodia won by 6 wickets
AZ Group Cricket Oval, Phnom Penh
Player of the match: Mahaj Chadha (Cam)

- Cambodia won the toss and elected to field.

14 May 2023
08:50
Scorecard

Singapore; 80/5 (6 overs)	v	Philippines; 84/2 (6 overs)
Raoul Sharma 18 (7); Henry Tyler 1/6 (1 over)		Henry Tyler 52 (21); Amjad Mahboob 1/6 (1 over)

Philippines won by 4 wickets
AZ Group Cricket Oval, Phnom Penh
Player of the match: Henry Tyler (Phi)

- Philippines won the toss and elected to field.

14 May 2023
10:00
Scorecard

Cambodia; 95/1 (6 overs)	v	Philippines; 80/4 (6 overs)
Mahaj Chadha 49 (16)		Miggy Podosky 50* (22); Ram Sharan 2/6 (1 over)

Cambodia won by 15 runs
AZ Group Cricket Oval, Phnom Penh
Player of the match: Mahaj Chadha (Cam)

- Philippines won the toss and elected to field.

14 May 2023
11:10
Scorecard

Singapore; 85/4 (6 overs)	v	Indonesia; 71/4 (6 overs)
Navin Param 26 (8); Kadek Gamantika 1/6 (1 over)		Danilson Hawoe 25* (14); Rohan Rangarajan 1/6 (1 over)

Singapore won by 14 runs
AZ Group Cricket Oval, Phnom Penh
Player of the match: Navin Param (Sin)

- Indonesia won the toss and elected to field.

15 May 2023
07:00
Scorecard

Indonesia; 71/4 (6 overs)	v	Philippines; 69/3 (6 overs)
Danilson Hawoe 24* (6); Kepler Lukies 2/9 (1 over)		Miggy Podosky 27* (8); Anjar Tadarus 2/2 (1 over)

Indonesia won by 2 runs
AZ Group Cricket Oval, Phnom Penh
Player of the match: Anjar Tadarus (Idn)

- Philippines won the toss and elected to field.

15 May 2023
07:50
Scorecard

Singapore; 97/3 (6 overs)	v	Cambodia; 71/5 (6 overs)
Raoul Sharma 50 (18); Gulam Chughtai 1/14 (1 over)		Luqman Butt 20 (8); Raoul Sharma 2/12 (1 over)

Singapore won by 26 runs
AZ Group Cricket Oval, Phnom Penh
Player of the match: Raoul Sharma (Sin)

- Cambodia won the toss and elected to field.

== T10 ==
=== Group A ===
Pos	Team	Pld	W	L	D	NR	NRR	Pts	Final result
1	Malaysia	2	1	1	0	0	2.200	2	Advanced to Gold medal match
2	Singapore	2	1	1	0	0	–0.427	2	Advanced to Bronze medal match
3	Thailand	2	1	1	0	0	–1.877	2	Eliminated

12 May 2023
07:00
Scorecard

Malaysia; 128/5 (10 overs)	v	Thailand; 75/5 (10 overs)
Virandeep Singh 79 (27); Kamron Senamontree 2/27 (2 overs)		Sittipong Hongsi 27* (22); Pavandeep Singh 3/12 (2 overs)

Malaysia won by 53 runs
AZ Group Cricket Oval, Phnom Penh
Player of the match: Virandeep Singh (Mas)

- Malaysia won the toss and elected to bat.

13 May 2023
07:00

Singapore; 107/5 (10 overs)	v	Malaysia; 98/6 (10 overs)
Anish Paraam 48* (17); Pavandeep Singh 1/9 (2 overs)		Syed Aziz 25 (9); Adwitya Bhargava 3/27 (2 overs)

Singapore won by 9 runs
AZ Group Cricket Oval, Phnom Penh
Player of the match: Anish Paraam (Sin)

- Singapore won the toss and elected to bat.

14 May 2023
07:00
Scorecard

Singapore; 83/9 (10 overs)	v	Thailand; 84/3 (8.2 overs)
Rohan Rangarajan19 (15); Vichanath Singh 3/11 (2 overs)		Sorawat Desungnoen 33 (21; Aahan Gopinath Achar 2/24 (2 overs)

Thailand won by 7 wickets
AZ Group Cricket Oval, Phnom Penh
Player of the match: Sorawat Desungnoen (Tha)

- Thailand won the toss and elected to field.

=== Group B ===
Pos	Team	Pld	W	L	D	NR	NRR	Pts	Final result
1	Cambodia	1	1	0	0	0	11.708	2	Advanced to Gold medal match
2	Philippines	1	0	1	0	0	–11.708	0	Advanced to Bronze medal match

12 May 2023
08:50
Scorecard

Cambodia; 36/3 (4.4 overs)	v	Philippines
Ram Sharan 20 (10); Amanpreet Sirah 1/3 (0.4 overs)

No result
AZ Group Cricket Oval, Phnom Penh

- Cambodia won the toss and elected to bat.
- Match abandoned due to rain
- Scheduled to be replayed in full on 13 May.

13 May 2023
14:15

Philippines; 43/9 (5 overs)	v	Cambodia; 44/2 (2.1 overs)
Henry Tyler 22 (12); Luqman Butt 2/1 (1 over)		Luqman Butt 38* (10); Daniel Smith 1/17 (1 over)

Cambodia won by 8 wickets
AZ Group Cricket Oval, Phnom Penh
Player of the match: Luqman Butt (Cam)

- Cambodia won the toss and elected to field.
- The match was reduced to five overs per side.

=== Bronze medal match ===
16 May 2023
10:00
Scorecard

Singapore; 93/9 (10 overs)	v	Philippines; 92/5 (10 overs)
Anish Paraam 22 (12); Miggy Podosky 3/9 (2 overs); Amanpreet Sirah 3/9 (2 overs)		Henry Tyler 29 (17); Anish Paraam 2/8 (2 overs)

Singapore won by 1 run
AZ Group Cricket Oval, Phnom Penh
Player of the match: Anish Paraam (Sin)

- Singapore won the toss and elected to bat.

=== Gold medal match ===
16 May 2023
14:00
Scorecard

Cambodia; 106/9 (10 overs)	v	Malaysia; 96/6 (10 overs)
Mahaj Chadha 43 (22); Sharvin Muniandy 3/15 (2 overs)		Zubaidi Zulkifle 40 (29); Utkarsh Jain 2/12 (2 overs)

Cambodia won by 10 runs
AZ Group Cricket Oval, Phnom Penh
Player of the match: Mahaj Chadha (Cam)

- Cambodia won the toss and elected to bat.

== T20 ==
=== Group A ===
Pos	Team	Pld	W	L	D	NR	NRR	Pts	Final result
1	Malaysia	2	2	0	0	0	4.135	4	Advanced to Gold medal match
2	Indonesia	2	1	1	0	0	–1.550	2	Advanced to Bronze medal match
3	Thailand	2	0	2	0	0	–2.187	0	Eliminated

1 May 2023
10:00
Scorecard

Indonesia; 122/8 (20 overs)	v	Thailand; 90/9 (20 overs)
Kadek Gamantika 24 (21); Noppon Senamontree 2/12 (4 overs)		Kiatiwut Suttisan 26 (33); Danilson Hawoe 3/11 (4 overs)

Indonesia won by 32 runs
AZ Group Cricket Oval, Phnom Penh
Umpires: Hardeep Jadeja (Sin) and Zaidan Taha (Mas)
Player of the match: Danilson Hawoe (Idn)

- Thailand won the toss and elected to field.
- Muhaddis, Ketut Pastika (Idn) and Satarut Rungrueang (Tha) all made their T20I debuts.

2 May 2023
07:00
Scorecard

Malaysia; 191/6 (20 overs)	v	Indonesia; 97/4 (20 overs)
Virandeep Singh 116* (62); Gede Arta 2/28 (4 overs)		Anjar Tadarus 37 (38); Virandeep Singh 2/15 (4 overs)

Malaysia won by 94 runs
AZ Group Cricket Oval, Phnom Penh
Umpires: Hardeep Jadeja (Sin) and Hitesh Sharma (Phi)
Player of the match: Virandeep Singh (Mas)

- Indonesia won the toss and elected to field.
- Virandeep Singh became the first player for Malaysia to score a century in T20Is.

4 May 2023
07:00
Scorecard

Thailand; 113/8 (20 overs)	v	Malaysia; 114/2 (12.3 overs)
Satarut Rungrueang 46 (32); Virandeep Singh 2/13 (4 overs)		Syed Aziz 55* (29); Kamron Senamontree 2/27 (3 overs)

Malaysia won by 8 wickets
AZ Group Cricket Oval, Phnom Penh
Umpires: Hitesh Sharma (Phi) and Yousuf Wadu (Idn)
Player of the match: Syed Aziz (Mas)

- Malaysia won the toss and elected to field.
- Wan Azam (Mas) made his T20I debut.

=== Group B ===
Pos	Team	Pld	W	L	D	NR	NRR	Pts	Final result
1	Cambodia	2	2	0	0	0	0.575	4	Advanced to Gold medal match
2	Singapore	2	1	1	0	0	1.800	2	Advanced to Bronze medal match
3	Philippines	2	0	2	0	0	–2.375	0	Eliminated

3 May 2023
14:30
Scorecard

Singapore; 181/5 (20 overs)	v	Philippines; 94/9 (20 overs)
Anish Paraam 100* (62); Daniel Smith 2/35 (4 overs)		Jordan Alegre 23 (39); Adwitya Bhargava 2/11 (3 overs)

Singapore won by 87 runs
AZ Group Cricket Oval, Phnom Penh
Umpires: Samad Akbar (Tha) and Riaz Ur Rahman (Idn)
Player of the match: Anish Paraam (Sin)

- Singapore won the toss and elected to bat.
- Josef Doctora, Kepler Lukies, Robert Mitchell, Amanpreet Sirah, Neil Smith (Phi) and Raoul Sharma (Sin) all made their T20I debuts.
- Anish Paraam (Sin) scored his first century in T20Is.

4 May 2023
10:30
Scorecard

Cambodia; 181/7 (20 overs)	v	Singapore; 166 (19.5 overs)
Luqman Butt 49 (23); Adwitya Bhargava 4/19 (4 overs)		Raoul Sharma 42 (24); Uday Hathinjar 3/21 (4 overs)

Cambodia won by 15 runs
AZ Group Cricket Oval, Phnom Penh
Umpires: Samad Akbar (Tha) and Riaz Ur Rahman (Idn)
Player of the match: Luqman Butt (Cam)

- Cambodia won the toss and elected to bat.
- Etienne Beukes, Luqman Butt, Mahaj Chadha, Gulam Chughtai, Sharwan Godara, Lakshit Gupta, Uday Hathinjar, Utkarsh Jain, Anish Prasad, Ram Sharan and Salvin Stanly (Cam) all made their T20I debuts.

10 May 2023
07:00
Scorecard

Cambodia; 182/5 (20 overs)	v	Philippines; 174 (20 overs)
Mahaj Chadha 50 (42); Daniel Smith 2/32 (4 overs)		Daniel Smith 68 (43); Luqman Butt 4/40 (4 overs)

Cambodia won by 8 runs
AZ Group Cricket Oval, Phnom Penh
Umpires: Hardeep Jadeja (Sin) and Yousuf Wadu (Idn)
Player of the match: Luqman Butt (Cam)

- Cambodia won the toss and elected to bat.
- Ryan Hutton (Phi) made his T20I debut.

=== Bronze medal match ===
11 May 2023
07:00
Scorecard

Singapore; 162/6 (20 overs)	v	Indonesia; 147/8 (20 overs)
Anish Paraam 59 (39); Ferdinando Banunaek 2/28 (4 overs)		Ferdinando Banunaek 45 (47); Amjad Mahboob 3/29 (4 overs)

Singapore won by 15 runs
AZ Group Cricket Oval, Phnom Penh
Umpires: Samad Akbar (Tha) and Zaidan Taha (Mas)
Player of the match: Anish Paraam (Sin)

- Singapore won the toss and elected to bat.
- Venkatesan Thiyanesh (Sin) made his T20I debut.

=== Gold medal match ===
11 May 2023
10:30
Scorecard

Cambodia; 143/9 (20 overs)	v	Malaysia; 131 (19.1 overs)
Mahaj Chadha 35 (30); Syazrul Idrus 3/30 (4 overs)		Vijay Unni 38 (33); Gulam Chughtai 3/20 (4 overs)

Cambodia won by 12 runs
AZ Group Cricket Oval, Phnom Penh
Umpires: Riaz Ur Rahman (Idn) and Hitesh Sharma (Phi)
Player of the match: Gulam Chughtai (Cam)

- Malaysia won the toss and elected to field.

== 50 overs ==
=== Group A ===
Pos	Team	Pld	W	L	D	NR	NRR	Pts	Final result
1	Malaysia	1	1	0	0	0	6.085	2	Advanced to Gold medal match
2	Thailand	1	0	1	0	0	–6.085	0	Advanced to Bronze medal match

3 May 2023
07:00
Scorecard

Thailand; 78 (26 overs)	v	Malaysia; 79/3 (10.2 overs)
Sittipong Hongsi 18 (18); Sharvin Muniandy 4/26 (6 overs)		Vijay Unni 31* (24); Chanchai Pengkumta 1/13 (3 overs)

Malaysia won by 7 wickets
AZ Group Cricket Oval, Phnom Penh
Player of the match: Sharvin Muniandy (Mas)

- Thailand won the toss and elected to bat.

=== Group B ===
Pos	Team	Pld	W	L	D	NR	NRR	Pts	Final result
1	Cambodia	1	1	0	0	0	2.580	2	Advanced to Gold medal match
2	Indonesia	1	0	1	0	0	–2.580	0	Advanced to Bronze medal match

29 April 2023
07:00
Scorecard

Cambodia; 266 (49.5 overs)	v	Indonesia; 137 (34.2 overs)
Luqman Butt 90 (81); Danilson Hawoe 3/37 (10 overs)		Anjar Tadarus 34 (50); Sharwan Godara 3/22 (6.2 overs)

Cambodia won by 129 runs
AZ Group Cricket Oval, Phnom Penh
Umpires: Hardeep Jadeja (Sin) and Zaidan Taha (Mas)
Player of the match: Luqman Butt (Cam)

- Cambodia won the toss and elected to bat.

=== Bronze medal match ===
6 May 2023
07:00
Scorecard

Indonesia; 158 (43.3 overs)	v	Thailand; 159/7 (40.3 overs)
Ferdinando Banunaek 56 (101); Kamron Senamontree 4/30 (9 overs)		Yodsak Saranonnakkun 37 (37); Ferdinando Banunaek 4/29 (8 overs)

Thailand won by 3 wickets
AZ Group Cricket Oval, Phnom Penh
Umpires: Hitesh Sharma (Phi) and Zaidan Taha (Mas)
Player of the match: Kamron Senamontree (Tha)

- Indonesia won the toss and elected to bat.

=== Gold medal match ===
7 May 2023
07:00
Scorecard

Cambodia; 334/7 (50 overs)	v	Malaysia; 245 (40 overs)
Ram Sharan 111 (86); Muhammad Wafiq 4/94 (10 overs)		Ahmad Faiz 78 (62); Luqman Butt 5/39 (9 overs)

Cambodia won by 89 runs
AZ Group Cricket Oval, Phnom Penh
Umpires: Samad Akbar (Tha) and Hardeep Jadeja (Sin)
Player of the match: Luqman Butt (Cam)

- Cambodia won the toss and elected to bat.

== See also ==
- Cricket at the 2023 SEA Games – Women's tournament
