= Cricket at the 2023 SEA Games – Women's tournament =

The women's cricket tournament at the 2023 SEA Games in Cambodia took place at the AZ Group Cricket Oval in Phnom Penh. The 2023 Games featured 4 medal events each for women's and men's cricket (6s, T10, T20 and 50-over).

Indonesia won the gold in the women's 6s event, while Thailand grabbed the remaining three women's cricket gold medals, in the T10, T20 and 50-over events.

== Squads ==
Cambodia	Indonesia	Malaysia	Myanmar	Philippines	Singapore	Thailand
Pen Samon (c); Sean Chan Boromey; Sok Srey Maov; Dok Da Nit; Phoup Srey Pheak; Pech Pisa; Em Rotana; Ly Saomakara; Hak Seakmey; Soung Seav; Hor Siv na; Ouen Sophy (wk); Hon Sovannary (wk); Loch Srey; Heal Theara	Ni Wayan Sariani (c, wk); Andriani; Yulia Anggraeni; Mia Arda; Ni Ariani; Maria Corazon; Ni Luh Dewi; Sang Maypriani; Rahmawati Pangestuti; Berlian Duma Pare; Lie Qiao; Ni Kadek Fitria Rada Rani; Ni Putu Ayu Nanda Sakarini (wk); Laili Salsabila; Ni Made Putri Suwandewi	Winifred Duraisingam (c); Mas Elysa (vc); Nik Nur Atiela; Christina Baret (wk); Aisya Eleesa; Ainna Hamizah Hashim; Elsa Hunter; Jamahidaya Intan; Mahirah Izzati Ismail; Wan Julia (wk); Dhanusri Muhunan; Aina Najwa (wk); Nur Arianna Natsya; Nur Dania Syuhada; Yusrina Yaakop	Zar Win (c, wk); Htet Aung; Thae Thae Aung; Lin Htun; Zon Lin; Zin Kyaw; Aye Moe; Khin Myat; Wa Thone Nadi; Htwe Neaung; Pan Ei Phyu; Thae Thae Po; May San; Theint Soe; Zar Thoon	Josie Arimas (c); Jennifer Alumbro; Jhon Andreano; Shanilyn Asis; ~~Joan Badillo~~; Catherine Bagaoisan (wk); Jona Eguid; Joelle Galapin; ~~Christine Lovino~~; Ma Mandia; Johannah McCall (wk); Lolita Olagiure; Romela Osabel; Riza Penalba (wk); April Saquilon; Simran Sirah; Alex Smith	Shafina Mahesh (c); Lim Belle; Haresh Dhavina; Diviya G K; Pin Goh; Ang Cui Lin; Sara Merican; Jocelyn Pooranakaran; Johanna Pooranakaran; Ananya Sarma; Roshni Seth; Samuel Sharon; Jacinta Si Ping (wk); Vathana Sreemurugavel; Zay Hua Tan	Naruemol Chaiwai (c); Nattaya Boochatham; Nanthita Boonsukham; Natthakan Chantam; Sunida Chaturongrattana; Onnicha Kamchomphu; Rosenanee Kanoh; Nannapat Koncharoenkai (wk); Suleeporn Laomi; Banthida Leephatthana (wk); Phannita Maya; Thipatcha Putthawong; Chanida Sutthiruang; Aphisara Suwanchonrathi; Sornnarin Tippoch

== 6s ==
=== Group A ===
Pos	Team	Pld	W	L	D	NR	NRR	Pts	Final result
1	Indonesia	2	2	0	0	0	3.559	4	Advanced to Gold medal match
2	Myanmar	2	1	1	0	0	–0.666	2	Advanced to Bronze medal match
3	Singapore	2	0	2	0	0	–2.805	0	

10 May 2023
11:00
Scorecard

Indonesia; 72/1 (6 overs)	v	Singapore; 43/1 (6 overs)
Ni Putu Ayu Nanda Sakarini 54* (26); Shafina Mahesh 1/8 (1 over)		Diviya G K 26* (20; Ni Putu Ayu Nanda Sakarini 1/5 (1 over)

Indonesia won by 29 runs
AZ Group Cricket Oval, Phnom Penh
Umpires: Samad Akbar (Tha) and Hitesh Sharma (Phi)
Player of the match: Ni Putu Ayu Nanda Sakarini (Idn)

- Singapore won the toss and elected to field.

10 May 2023
12:40
Scorecard

Singapore; 55/4 (6 overs)	v	Myanmar; 56/3 (5.4 overs)
Diviya G K 34* (23); Zon Lin 2/3 (1 over)		Khin Myat 16 (9); Shafina Mahesh 1/7 (1 over)

Myanmar won by 3 wickets
AZ Group Cricket Oval, Phnom Penh
Umpires: Hitesh Sharma (Phi) and Zaidan Taha (Mas)
Player of the match: Zon Lin (Mya)

- Myanmar won the toss and elected to field.

10 May 2023
13:40
Scorecard

Myanmar; 45/2 (6 overs)	v	Indonesia; 46/3 (4.5 overs)
Zon Lin 29* (18); Ni Luh Dewi 1/1 (1 over)		Maria Corazon 20* (11); Thae Thae Aung 1/6 (1 over)

Indonesia won by 3 wickets
AZ Group Cricket Oval, Phnom Penh
Umpires: Samad Akbar (Tha) and Hitesh Sharma (Phi)
Player of the match: Maria Corazon (Idn)

- Indonesia won the toss and elected to field.

=== Group B ===
Pos	Team	Pld	W	L	D	NR	NRR	Pts	Final result
1	Philippines	1	1	0	0	0	2.000	2	Advanced to Gold medal match
2	Cambodia	1	0	1	0	0	–2.000	0	Advanced to Bronze medal match

10 May 2023
11:50
Scorecard

Philippines; 54/2 (6 overs)	v	Cambodia; 42/0 (6 overs)
Alex Smith 23 (18)		Pen Samon 22* (17)

Philippines won by 12 runs
AZ Group Cricket Oval, Phnom Penh
Umpires: Samad Akbar (Tha) and Zaidan Taha (Mas)
Player of the match: Alex Smith (Phi)

- Cambodia won the toss and elected to field.

=== Bronze medal match ===
10 May 2023
15:00
Scorecard

Cambodia; 23/3 (6 overs)	v	Myanmar; 24/0 (1.5 overs)
Pen Samon 12* (17); Khin Myat 2/2 (1 over)		Theint Soe 12* (8)

Myanmar won by 6 wickets
AZ Group Cricket Oval, Phnom Penh
Player of the match: Khin Myat (Mya)

- Cambodia won the toss and elected to bat.

=== Gold medal match ===
10 May 2023
15:50
Scorecard

Indonesia; 78/1 (6 overs)	v	Philippines; 25/5 (6 overs)
Maria Corazon 31* (18); April Saquilon 1/12 (1 over)		April Saquilon 11* (14); Ni Putu Ayu Nanda Sakarini 1/2 (1 over)

Indonesia won by 53 runs
AZ Group Cricket Oval, Phnom Penh
Player of the match: Maria Corazon (Idn)

- Philippines won the toss and elected to field.

== T10 ==
2023 SEA Games – Women's T10
- Dates: 29 April – 16 May 2023
- Administrator: Southeast Asian Games Federation
- Cricket format: T10
- Tournament format(s): Group round-robin and knockouts
- Host: Cambodia
- Champions: Thailand (1st title)
- Runners-up: Philippines
- Third place: Malaysia
- Participants: 5
- Matches: 6
- Most runs: (Malaysia) Winifred Duraisingam (39)
- Most wickets: (Thailand) Nattaya Boochatham (8)

=== Group A ===
Pos	Team	Pld	W	L	D	NR	NRR	Pts	Final result
1	Thailand	2	2	0	0	0	2.596	4	Advanced to Gold medal match
2	Malaysia	2	1	1	0	0	1.347	2	Advanced to Bronze medal match
3	Singapore	2	0	2	0	0	–6.493	0	

29 April 2023
16:30
Scorecard

Singapore; 37/3 (10 overs)	v	Malaysia; 38/1 (4.1 overs)
Diviya G K 12 (14); Mahirah Izzati Ismail 2/3 (2 overs)		Mas Elysa 14* (17); Diviya G K 1/4 (1 overs)

Malaysia won by 9 wickets
AZ Group Cricket Oval, Phnom Penh
Umpires: Samad Akbar (Tha) and Riaz Ur Rahman (Idn)
Player of the match: Mahirah Izzati Ismail (Mas)

- Malaysia won the toss and elected to field.

7 May 2023
14:30
Scorecard

Malaysia; 39/8 (10 overs)	v	Thailand; 40/4 (8.5 overs)
Winifred Duraisingam 22* (25); Nattaya Boochatham 3/2 (2 overs)		Rosenanee Kanoh 12 (11); Ainna Hamizah Hashim 3/3 (2 overs)

Thailand won by 6 wickets
AZ Group Cricket Oval, Phnom Penh
Umpires: Riaz Ur Rahman (Idn) and Yousuf Wadu (Idn)
Player of the match: Nattaya Boochatham (Tha)

- Malaysia won the toss and elected to bat.

14 May 2023
15:00
Scorecard

Singapore; 18/5 (10 overs)	v	Thailand; 19/1 (2 overs)
Diviya G K 9* (17); Onnicha Kamchomphu 1/2 (2 overs)		Nannapat Koncharoenkai 16* (8); Johanna Pooranakaran 1/7 (1 over)

Thailand won by 9 wickets
AZ Group Cricket Oval, Phnom Penh
Player of the match: Nannapat Koncharoenkai (Tha)

- Thailand won the toss and elected to field.

=== Group B ===
Pos	Team	Pld	W	L	D	NR	NRR	Pts	Final result
1	Philippines	1	1	0	0	0	2.523	2	Advanced to Gold medal match
2	Cambodia	1	0	1	0	0	–2.523	0	Advanced to Bronze medal match

29 April 2023
16:30
Scorecard

Cambodia; 44/3 (10 overs)	v	Philippines; 45/3 (6.3 overs)
Pen Samon 14* (22); Romela Osabel 2/12 (2 overs)		April Saquilon 14* (17); Loch Srey 1/7 (2 overs)

Philippines won by 7 wickets
AZ Group Cricket Oval, Phnom Penh
Umpires: Samad Akbar (Tha) and Riaz Ur Rahman (Idn)
Player of the match: April Saquilon (Phi)

- Philippines won the toss and elected to field.

=== Bronze medal match ===
16 May 2023
08:00
Scorecard

Cambodia; 16/7 (10 overs)	v	Malaysia; 17/0 (1.5 overs)
Phoup Srey Pheak 7 (20); Nik Nur Atiela 2/6 (2 overs)		Winifred Duraisingam 9* (5)

Malaysia won by 10 wickets
AZ Group Cricket Oval, Phnom Penh
Player of the match: Nik Nur Atiela (Mas)

- Malaysia won the toss and elected to field.

=== Gold medal match ===
16 May 2023
12:00
Scorecard

Philippines; 11/9 (10 overs)	v	Thailand; 13/0 (1.2 overs)
Jona Eguid 4 (11); Nattaya Boochatham 4/3 (2 overs)		Natthakan Chantam 7* (4)

Thailand won by 10 wickets
AZ Group Cricket Oval, Phnom Penh
Player of the match: Nattaya Boochatham (Tha)

- Philippines won the toss and elected to bat.

== T20 ==
2023 SEA Games – Women's T20
- Dates: 1 – 15 May 2023
- Administrator: Southeast Asian Games Federation
- Cricket format: Twenty20 International
- Tournament format(s): Group round-robin and knockouts
- Host: Cambodia
- Champions: Thailand (1st title)
- Runners-up: Indonesia
- Third place: Malaysia
- Participants: 7
- Matches: 11
- Most runs: (Thailand) Natthakan Chantham (115)
- Most wickets: (Thailand) Thipatcha Putthawong (11)

=== Group A ===
Pos	Team	Pld	W	L	D	NR	NRR	Pts	Final result
1	Thailand	3	3	0	0	0	2.460	6	Advanced to Gold medal match
2	Malaysia	3	2	1	0	0	2.367	4	Advanced to Bronze medal match
3	Myanmar	3	1	2	0	0	–0.934	2	Eliminated
4	Philippines	3	0	3	0	0	–6.310	0	Eliminated

1 May 2023
07:00
Scorecard

Philippines; 9 (11.1 overs)	v	Thailand; 10/0 (0.4 overs)
Jennifer Alumbro 2 (8); Thipatcha Putthawong 4/3 (4 overs)		Natthakan Chantham 6* (2)

Thailand won by 10 wickets
AZ Group Cricket Oval, Phnom Penh
Umpires: Zaidan Taha (Mas) and Yousuf Wadu (Idn)
Player of the match: Thipatcha Putthawong (Tha)

- Thailand won the toss and elected to field.
- Joelle Galapin and Alex Smith (Phi) both made their WT20I debuts.

4 May 2023
14:00
Scorecard

Thailand; 53 (18.3 overs)	v	Malaysia; 41 (15.3 overs)
Natthakan Chantham 13 (22); Winifred Duraisingam 3/9 (3.3 overs)		Elsa Hunter 19 (32); Thipatcha Putthawong 3/3 (3.3 overs)

Thailand won by 12 runs
AZ Group Cricket Oval, Phnom Penh
Umpires: Hardeep Jadeja (Sin) and Riaz Ur Rahman (Idn)
Player of the match: Thipatcha Putthawong (Tha)

- Malaysia won the toss and elected to field.
- Thailand's 53 was the lowest total successfully defended in a women's T20I where overs were not reduced.
- Thailand's 2.86 run-per-over rate is the second lowest rate successfully defended in a women's T20I.

6 May 2023
14:00
Scorecard

Philippines; 21/9 (20 overs)	v	Malaysia; 23/0 (2.3 overs)
Catherine Bagaoisan 7 (36); Dhanusri Muhunan 3/5 (3 overs)		Mas Elysa 11* (6)

Malaysia won by 10 wickets
AZ Group Cricket Oval, Phnom Penh
Umpires: Samad Akbar (Tha) and Hardeep Jadeja (Sin)
Player of the match: Dhanusri Muhunan (Mas)

- Malaysia won the toss and elected to field.

9 May 2023
14:00
Scorecard

Myanmar; 37/9 (20 overs)	v	Thailand; 38/0 (5.1 overs)
May San 11 (48); Thipatcha Putthawong 3/2 (4 overs)		Natthakan Chantam 23* (23)

Thailand won by 10 wickets
AZ Group Cricket Oval, Phnom Penh
Umpires: Hardeep Jadeja (Sin) and Riaz Ur Rahman (Idn)
Player of the match: Thipatcha Putthawong (Tha)

- Myanmar won the toss and elected to bat.
- Pan Ei Phyu and Thae Thae Po (Mya) both made their WT20I debuts.

11 May 2023
14:35
Scorecard

Philippines; 47 (14.2 overs)	v	Myanmar; 48/4 (7.3 overs)
Alex Smith 17 (24); Wa Thone Nadi 4/13 (4 overs)		Zin Kyaw 13* (9); Alex Smith 1/13 (4 overs)

Myanmar won by 6 wickets
AZ Group Cricket Oval, Phnom Penh
Umpires: Riaz Ur Rahman (Idn) and Hitesh Sharma (Phi)
Player of the match: Wa Thone Nadi (Mya)

- Myanmar won the toss and elected to field.
- Wa Thone Nadi (Mya) made her WT20I debut.

14 May 2023
13:20
Scorecard

Malaysia; 106/8 (20 overs)	v	Myanmar; 24 (11.5 overs)
Winifred Duraisingam 29 (39); Khin Myat 4/11 (2 overs)		Zon Lin 10* (12); Ainna Hamizah Hashim 5/4 (4 overs)

Malaysia won by 82 runs
AZ Group Cricket Oval, Phnom Penh
Umpires: Samad Akbar (Tha) and Hardeep Jadeja (Sin)
Player of the match: Ainna Hamizah Hashim (Mas)

- Malaysia won the toss and elected to bat.
- Ainna Hamizah Hashim (Mas) took her first five-wicket haul in WT20Is.

=== Group B ===
Pos	Team	Pld	W	L	D	NR	NRR	Pts	Final result
1	Indonesia	2	2	0	0	0	3.967	4	Advanced to Gold medal match
2	Singapore	2	1	1	0	0	0.300	2	Advanced to Bronze medal match
3	Cambodia	2	0	2	0	0	–4.471	0	Eliminated

30 April 2023
14:30
Scoreboard

Singapore; 132/3 (20 overs)	v	Cambodia; 68/5 (20 overs)
Shafina Mahesh 45* (48); Hak Seakmey 2/23 (4 overs)		Pen Samon 17 (24); Shafina Mahesh 2/11 (4 overs)

Singapore won by 64 runs
AZ Group Cricket Oval, Phnom Penh
Umpires: Samad Akbar (Tha) and Hitesh Sharma (Phi)
Player of the match: Shafina Mahesh (Sin)

- Cambodia won the toss and elected to field.

1 May 2023
14:00
Scorecard

Indonesia; 121/5 (20 overs)	v	Singapore; 69 (19.1 overs)
Maria Corazon 53 (45); Shafina Mahesh 2/22 (4 overs)		Roshni Seth 19 (20); Andriani 3/8 (4 overs)

Indonesia won by 52 runs
AZ Group Cricket Oval, Phnom Penh
Umpires: Samad Akbar (Tha) and Hardeep Jadeja (Sin)
Player of the match: Maria Corazon (Idn)

- Indonesia won the toss and elected to bat.
- Ni Ariani and Ni Luh Dewi (Idn) both made their WT20I debuts.

8 May 2023
07:00
Scorecard

Cambodia; 21 (19.2 overs)	v	Indonesia; 22/1 (3 overs)
Pen Samon 4 (9); Andriani 3/2 (4 overs)		Ni Putu Ayu Nanda Sakarini 5* (13); Loch Srey 1/14 (2 overs)

Indonesia won by 9 wickets
AZ Group Cricket Oval, Phnom Penh
Umpires: Samad Akbar (Tha) and Zaidan Taha (Mas)
Player of the match: Andriani (Idn)

- Cambodia won the toss and elected to bat.

=== Bronze medal match ===
15 May 2023
09:45
Scorecard

Singapore; 51/6 (20 overs)	v	Malaysia; 54/2 (9.1 overs)
Diviya G K 20* (46); Mahirah Izzati Ismail 2/6 (4 overs)		Elsa Hunter 23* (16); Johanna Pooranakaran 2/22 (3 overs)

Malaysia won by 8 wickets
AZ Group Cricket Oval, Phnom Penh
Umpires: Samad Akbar (Tha) and Yousuf Wadu (Idn)
Player of the match: Mahirah Izzati Ismail (Mas)

- Singapore won the toss and elected to bat.
- Ananya Sarma (Sin) made her WT20I debut.

=== Gold medal match ===
15 May 2023
12:45
Scorecard

Thailand; 120/3 (20 overs)	v	Indonesia; 80/6 (20 overs)
Natthakan Chantam 73* (61); Ni Wayan Sariani 2/24 (4 overs)		Ni Kadek Fitria Rada Rani 21* (30); Sornnarin Tippoch 1/4 (2 overs)

Thailand won by 40 runs
AZ Group Cricket Oval, Phnom Penh
Umpires: Hardeep Jadeja (Sin) and Zaidan Taha (Mas)
Player of the match: Natthakan Chantam (Tha)

- Indonesia won the toss and elected to field.

== 50 overs ==
=== Group A ===
Pos	Team	Pld	W	L	D	NR	NRR	Pts	Final result
1	Thailand	2	2	0	0	0	3.927	4	Advanced to Gold medal match
2	Malaysia	2	1	1	0	0	–0.469	2	Advanced to Bronze medal match
3	Myanmar	2	0	2	0	0	–3.117	0	Eliminated

30 April 2023
07:00
Scoreboard

Myanmar; 122 (44.5 overs)	v	Malaysia; 123/6 (35.3 overs)
Theint Soe 51 (110); Mahirah Izzati Ismail 4/12 (8.5 overs)		Elsa Hunter 30* (62); Zar Win 2/20 (9 overs)

Malaysia won by 4 wickets
AZ Group Cricket Oval, Phnom Penh
Umpires: Hardeep Jadeja (Sin) and Riaz Ur Rahman (Idn)
Player of the match: Mahirah Izzati Ismail (Mas)

- Myanmar won the toss and elected to bat.

2 May 2023
10:30
Scorecard

Thailand; 300/7 (50 overs)	v	Myanmar; 61 (40.5 overs)
Nannapat Koncharoenkai 64 (61); Lin Htun 2/38 (7 overs)		May San 14* (87); Chanida Sutthiruang 2/3 (4 overs)

Thailand won by 239 runs
AZ Group Cricket Oval, Phnom Penh
Umpires: Riaz Ur Rahman (Idn) and Yousuf Wadu (Idn)
Player of the match: Nannapat Koncharoenkai (Tha)

- Thailand won the toss and elected to bat.

8 May 2023
10:30
Scorecard

Malaysia; 82 (46.2 overs)	v	Thailand; 83/2 (21.3 overs)
Winifred Duraisingam 29 (85); Thipatcha Putthawong 3/12 (9.2 overs)		Sornnarin Tippoch 40* (56); Dhanusri Muhunan 1/17 (3 overs)

Thailand won by 8 wickets
AZ Group Cricket Oval, Phnom Penh
Umpires: Hardeep Jadeja (Sin) and Hitesh Sharma (Phi)
Player of the match: Thipatcha Putthawong (Tha)

- Malaysia won the toss and elected to bat.

=== Group B ===
Pos	Team	Pld	W	L	D	NR	NRR	Pts	Final result
1	Indonesia	1	1	0	0	0	9.320	2	Advanced to Gold medal match
2	Cambodia	1	0	1	0	0	–9.320	0	Advanced to Bronze medal match

9 May 2023
07:00
Scorecard

Cambodia; 14 (14 overs)	v	Indonesia; 16/0 (1.4 overs)
Loch Srey 4 (13); Ni Luh Dewi 5/6 (6 overs)		Yulia Anggraeni 7* (7)

Indonesia won by 10 wickets
AZ Group Cricket Oval, Phnom Penh
Umpires: Samad Akbar (Tha) and Zaidan Taha (Mas)
Player of the match: Ni Luh Dewi (Idn)

- Indonesia won the toss and elected to field.

=== Bronze medal match ===
12 May 2023
11:00
Scorecard

Cambodia; 19 (11.2 overs)	v	Malaysia; 20/0 (1.3 overs)
Pen Samon 6 (11); Ainna Hamizah Hashim 3/5 (3 overs)		Elsa Hunter 10* (6)

Malaysia won by 10 wickets
AZ Group Cricket Oval, Phnom Penh
Player of the match: Mahirah Izzati Ismail (Mas)

- Malaysia won the toss and elected to field.
- The match was reduced to 37 overs per side due to rain.

=== Gold medal match ===
13 May 2023
09:00
Scorecard

Thailand; 130 (35.2 overs)	v	Indonesia; 37 (27.4 overs)
Sornnarin Tippoch 27 (46); Ni Wayan Sariani 4/22 (6.3 overs)		Ni Ariani 6* (44); Chanida Sutthiruang 3/14 (5 overs)

Thailand won by 93 runs
AZ Group Cricket Oval, Phnom Penh
Player of the match: Chanida Sutthiruang (Tha)

- Indonesia won the toss and elected to field.

== See also ==
- Cricket at the 2023 SEA Games – Men's tournament
