= 2022 Saudari Cup =

	Singapore	Malaysia
- Dates: 8 – 10 July 2022
Captains	Shafina Mahesh	Winifred Duraisingam

Twenty20 International series
- Results: Malaysia won the 3-match series 3–0
Most runs	Shafina Mahesh (55)	Elsa Hunter (95)
Most wickets	Ada Bhasin (3); Shafina Mahesh (3)	Sasha Azmi (9)
- Player of the series: Sasha Azmi (Mas)

The 2022 Saudari Cup was contested between the women's national teams of Singapore and Malaysia from 8 to 10 July 2022. The series consisted of three Women's Twenty20 International (WT20I) matches.

The Saudari Cup is an annual event between the two sides, which started in 2014, with Malaysia winning all of the previous editions, including the 2019 edition, which was the most recent edition prior to the 2022 tournament.

Malaysia again retained the trophy, with a 3–0 series win over their hosts.

== Squads ==
Singapore	Malaysia
Shafina Mahesh (c, wk); Chathurani Abeyratne; Ada Bhasin; Riyaa Bhasin; Haresh Dhavina; Diviya G K; Piumi Gurusinghe (wk); Vinu Kumar; Jocelyn Pooranakaran; Johanna Pooranakaran; Dhwani Prakas (wk); Roshni Seth; Ishita Shukla; Zay Hua Tan	Winifred Duraisingam (c); Mas Elysa (vc); Nik Nur Atiela; Sasha Azmi; Zumika Azmi; Aisya Eleesa; Ainna Hamizah Hashim; Elsa Hunter; Jamahidaya Intan; Wan Julia (wk); Dhanusri Muhunan; Aina Najwa (wk); Nurilyaa Natasya; Nur Arianna Natsya; Amalin Sorfina; Nur Dania Syuhada

== T20I series ==
=== 1st WT20I ===
8 July 2022
19:30 (N)
Scorecard

Singapore; 78/9 (20 overs)	v	Malaysia; 79/4 (14.3 overs)
Shafina Mahesh 27 (34); Sasha Azmi 2/7 (4 overs)		Wan Julia 30 (44); Diviya G K 2/9 (4 overs)

Malaysia won by 6 wickets
Indian Association Ground, Singapore
Umpires: Ravi Putcha (Sin) and Reshanth Selvaratnam (Sin)
Player of the match: Sasha Azmi (Mas)

- Singapore won the toss and elected to bat.

=== 2nd WT20I ===
9 July 2022
19:30 (N)
Scorecard

Malaysia; 145/3 (20 overs)	v	Singapore; 70 (18 overs)
Elsa Hunter 53* (45); Ada Bhasin 2/19 (4 overs)		Ada Bhasin 15 (19); Nur Dania Syuhada 4/14 (4 overs)

Malaysia won by 75 runs
Indian Association Ground, Singapore
Umpires: Foyej Ahmed (Sin) and Pramesh Parab (Sin)
Player of the match: Elsa Hunter (Mas)

- Singapore won the toss and elected to field.

=== 3rd WT20I ===
10 July 2022
19:30 (N)
Scorecard

Malaysia; 156/3 (20 overs)	v	Singapore; 77 (18.5 overs)
Elsa Hunter 42* (22); Vinu Kumar 1/27 (4 overs)		Roshni Seth 34 (41); Sasha Azmi 4/20 (4 overs)

Malaysia won by 79 runs
Indian Association Ground, Singapore
Umpires: Foyej Ahmed (Sin) and Sathish Balasubramaniam (Sin)
Player of the match: Elsa Hunter (Mas)

- Malaysia won the toss and elected to bat.
- Dhwani Prakas (Sin) made her WT20I debut.

Preceded by 2019	Saudari Cup	Succeeded by
