= 2022 Singa Championship Series =

International cricket competition

	Singapore	Papua New Guinea
- Dates: 2 – 5 July 2022
Captains	Amjad Mahboob	Assad Vala

Twenty20 International series
- Results: 3-match series drawn 1–1
Most runs	Arjun Mutreja (113)	Tony Ura (99)
Most wickets	Vinoth Baskaran (4)	Damien Ravu (4)

The 2022 Singa Championship Series was a Twenty20 International (T20I) cricket series between the men's national teams of Singapore and Papua New Guinea which took place in Singapore in July 2022. Singapore came into the series after losing the 2022 Stan Nagaiah Trophy series to Malaysia two days earlier. The series provided both teams with preparation for the 2022 ICC Men's T20 World Cup Global Qualifier B tournament.

== Squads ==
Singapore	Papua New Guinea
Amjad Mahboob (c); Vinoth Baskaran; Surendran Chandramohan; Aman Desai (wk); Aritra Dutta; Rezza Gaznavi; Neil Karnik; Anantha Krishna; Arjun Mutreja; Navin Param; Janak Prakash; Akshay Puri; Rohan Rangarajan; Manpreet Singh (wk); Aryaman Sunil	Assad Vala (c); Charles Amini (vc); Simon Atai (wk); Sese Bau; Riley Hekure; Semo Kamea; Kabua Morea; Alei Nao; Damien Ravu; Lega Siaka; Chad Soper; Tony Ura; Norman Vanua; Hila Vare (wk)

== T20I series ==
=== 1st T20I ===
2 July 2022
19:30 (N)
Scorecard

Singapore; 168/5 (18 overs)	v	Papua New Guinea; 150/9 (18 overs)
Arjun Mutreja 77 (45); Norman Vanua 2/30 (4 overs)		Lega Siaka 45 (30); Akshay Puri 3/26 (4 overs)

Singapore won by 18 runs
Indian Association Ground, Singapore
Umpires: Hardeep Jadeja (Sin) and Anand Natarajan (Sin)
Player of the match: Arjun Mutreja (Sin)

- Singapore won the toss and elected to bat.
- The match was reduced to 18 overs per side due to rain.
- Arjun Mutreja (Sin) and Hila Vare (PNG) both made their T20I debuts.

=== 2nd T20I ===
3 July 2022
19:30 (N)
Scorecard

Singapore; 203/7 (20 overs)	v	Papua New Guinea; 206/7 (19.4 overs)
Surendran Chandramohan 100 (52); Damien Ravu 3/53 (4 overs)		Tony Ura 93* (40); Amjad Mahboob 2/12 (4 overs)

Papua New Guinea won by 3 wickets
Indian Association Ground, Singapore
Umpires: Hardeep Jadeja (Sin) and Senthil Kumar (Sin)
Player of the match: Tony Ura (PNG)

- Singapore won the toss and elected to bat.
- Neil Karnik (Sin) made his T20I debut.
- Surendran Chandramohan became the first player for Singapore to score a century in T20Is.

=== 3rd T20I ===
5 July 2022
19:30 (N)
Scorecard

Singapore	v	Papua New Guinea

Match abandoned
Indian Association Ground, Singapore
Umpires: Sathish Balasubramaniam (Sin) and Anand Natarajan (Sin)

- No toss.
- No play was possible due to rain.
