= 2019–20 Singapore Tri-Nation Series =

Cricket tournament

- Date: 27 September – 3 October 2019
- Location: Singapore
- Result: Zimbabwe won the series
Teams
| Nepal | Singapore | Zimbabwe |
Captains
| Paras Khadka | Amjad Mahboob (Note: Tim David captained Singapore against Nepal on 28 September.) | Sean Williams |
Most runs
| Paras Khadka (136) | Tim David (152) | Sean Williams (130) |
Most wickets
| Sandeep Lamichhane (5) | Janak Prakash (4) | Ryan Burl (6); Sean Williams (6) |

The 2019–20 Singapore Tri-Nation Series was a cricket tournament that was held from 27 September to 3 October 2019 in Singapore. It was a tri-nation series featuring Singapore, Nepal and Zimbabwe, with all the matches played as Twenty20 Internationals (T20Is). Singapore used the series to prepare for their first appearance in the ICC T20 World Cup Qualifier in October 2019. It was the first T20I tri-series to be played in Singapore.

Prior to the series, Zimbabwe also played in another tri-series, in Bangladesh. Zimbabwe Cricket named Sean Williams as Zimbabwe's captain, after Hamilton Masakadza announced that he would retire from international cricket following the conclusion of the tri-series in Bangladesh that took place earlier in September.

In the third match of the series, Singapore beat Zimbabwe by four runs. It was the first time that Singapore had beaten a Full Member team in an international cricket match. Despite their loss to Singapore, Zimbabwe went on to win the series, winning all their other matches.

== Squads ==
| Nepal | Singapore | Zimbabwe |
|---|---|---|
| Paras Khadka (c); Dipendra Singh Airee (vc); Binod Bhandari (wk); Sushan Bhari; Abinash Bohara; Sundeep Jora; Sompal Kami; Karan KC; Sandeep Lamichhane; Kushal Malla; Ishan Pandey; Rohit Paudel; Lalit Rajbanshi; Pawan Sarraf; Aarif Sheikh | Amjad Mahboob (c); Aahan Gopinath Achar; Vinoth Baskaran; Surendran Chandramohan; Tim David; Avi Dixit; Aritra Dutta; Rezza Gaznavi; Anantha Krishna; Arjun Mutreja; Navin Param; Janak Prakash; Utsav Rakshit; Rohan Rangarajan; Manpreet Singh (wk); Sidhant Singh; Aryaman Sunil; Selladore Vijayakumar | Sean Williams (c); Ryan Burl; Regis Chakabva; Brian Chari; Tendai Chatara; Craig Ervine; Daniel Jakiel; Neville Madziva; Timycen Maruma; Wellington Masakadza; William Mashinge; Peter Moor; Richmond Mutumbami (wk); Tinotenda Mutombodzi; Tony Munyonga; Richard Ngarava |

== Points table ==
| Pos | Team | Pld | W | L | T | NR | Pts | NRR |
|---|---|---|---|---|---|---|---|---|
| 1 | Zimbabwe | 4 | 3 | 1 | 0 | 0 | 6 | 0.833 |
| 2 | Nepal | 4 | 1 | 2 | 0 | 1 | 3 | −0.383 |
| 3 | Singapore (H) | 4 | 1 | 2 | 0 | 1 | 3 | −0.871 |

(H) Host

== Matches ==
=== 1st T20I ===
27 September 2019
19:30 (N)
Scorecard

| Nepal; 132/6 (20 overs) | v | Zimbabwe; 133/5 (18.1 overs) |
| Dipendra Singh Airee 40 (33); Sean Williams 2/19 (4 overs) | | Ryan Burl 41* (36); Sandeep Lamichhane 3/15 (4 overs) |

Zimbabwe won by 5 wickets
Indian Association Ground, Singapore
Umpires: Akbar Ali (UAE) and Anand Natarajan (Sin)
Player of the match: Richmond Mutumbami (Zim)

- Nepal won the toss and elected to bat.
- Kushal Malla, Ishan Pandey (Nep) and Brian Chari (Zim) all made their T20I debuts.
- Sean Williams captained Zimbabwe for the first time in T20Is.

=== 2nd T20I ===
28 September 2019
19:30 (N)
Scorecard

| Singapore; 151/3 (20 overs) | v | Nepal; 154/1 (16 overs) |
| Tim David 64* (44); Karan KC 2/34 (4 overs) | | Paras Khadka 106* (52); Janak Prakash 1/10 (3 overs) |

Nepal won by 9 wickets
Indian Association Ground, Singapore
Umpires: Akbar Ali (UAE) and Hardeep Jadeja (Sin)
Player of the match: Paras Khadka (Nep)

- Singapore won the toss and elected to bat.
- Navin Param, Sidhant Singh, Aryaman Sunil (Sin) and Sushan Bhari (Nep) all made their T20I debuts.
- Paras Khadka became the first batsman for Nepal to score a century in T20Is.

=== 3rd T20I ===
29 September 2019
19:30 (N)
Scorecard

| Singapore; 181/9 (18 overs) | v | Zimbabwe; 177/7 (18 overs) |
| Manpreet Singh 41 (23); Ryan Burl 3/24 (3 overs) | | Sean Williams 66 (35); Amjad Mahboob 2/20 (4 overs) |

Singapore won by 4 runs
Indian Association Ground, Singapore
Umpires: Akbar Ali (UAE) and Balraj Manikandan (Sin)
Player of the match: Sean Williams (Zim)

- Singapore won the toss and elected to bat.
- The match was reduced to 18 overs per side due to a wet outfield.
- Aahan Gopinath Achar, Aritra Dutta (Sin) and Richard Ngarava (Zim) all made their T20I debuts. This was Singapore's 1st win against full member nation in T20Is.

=== 4th T20I ===
1 October 2019
19:30 (N)
Scorecard

| Zimbabwe; 160/6 (20 overs) | v | Nepal; 120/9 (20 overs) |
| Sean Williams 53 (35); Sompal Kami 2/15 (4 overs) | | Binod Bhandari 33 (35); Sean Williams 3/21 (4 overs) |

Zimbabwe won by 40 runs
Indian Association Ground, Singapore
Umpires: Akbar Ali (UAE) and Senthil Kumar (Sin)
Player of the match: Sean Williams (Zim)

- Nepal won the toss and elected to field.
- Daniel Jakiel and William Mashinge (Zim) both made their T20I debuts.

=== 5th T20I ===
2 October 2019
19:30 (N)
Scorecard

| Singapore | v | Nepal |

Match abandoned
Indian Association Ground, Singapore
Umpires: Akbar Ali (UAE) and Hardeep Jadeja (Sin)

- No toss.
- No play was possible due to rain.

=== 6th T20I ===
3 October 2019
19:30 (N)
Scorecard

| Singapore; 167/7 (20 overs) | v | Zimbabwe; 168/2 (18.4 overs) |
| Surendran Chandramohan 66 (47); Daniel Jakiel 2/27 (4 overs) | | Peter Moor 92* (60); Tim David 1/26 (3 overs) |

Zimbabwe won by 8 wickets
Indian Association Ground, Singapore
Umpires: Hardeep Jadeja (Sin) and Anand Natarajan (Sin)
Player of the match: Peter Moor (Zim)

- Zimbabwe won the toss and elected to field.
