= 2019 Saudari Cup =

	Singapore women	Malaysia women
- Dates: 28 – 30 August 2019
Captains	Shafina Mahesh	Winifred Duraisingam

Twenty20 International series
- Results: Malaysia women won the 3-match series 3–0
Most runs	Diviya G K (111)	Winifred Duraisingam (111); Mas Elysa (111)
Most wickets	Haresh Dhavina (3)	Ainna Hamizah Hashim (3)

The 2019 Saudari Cup was contested between the women's national teams of Singapore and Malaysia from 28 to 30 August 2019 in Singapore.

The Saudari Cup is an annual event between the two sides, which started in 2014, with Malaysia winning all of the previous editions, including the most recent edition in 2018. The series consisted of three Women's Twenty20 International (WT20I) matches, all being played at the Indian Association Ground in Singapore. Malaysia retained the title, sweeping the series 3–0.

This was the second edition of the event to have WT20I status following the International Cricket Council's decision to grant T20I status to all matches played between women's sides of Associate Members after 1 July 2018.

== Squads ==
Singapore	Malaysia
Shafina Mahesh (c); Rajeshwari Butler; Haresh Dhavina; Diviya G K; Lucky Gautam; Piumi Gurusinghe; Shafia Hassan; Amna Jamal; Wang Ling; Vigineswari Pasupathy; Smruthi Radhakrishnan; Roshni Seth; Ishita Shukla; Sanika Sonpethkar	Winifred Duraisingam (c); Nur Alliah Asyqin; Nik Nur Atiela; Christina Baret; Mas Elysa; Ainna Hamizah Hashim; Jamahidaya Intan; Mahirah Izzati Ismail; Wan Julia; Nur Nadihirah; Nur Arianna Natsya; Yusrina Yaakop; Noor Hayati Zakaria; Wan Nor Zulaika

== T20I series ==
=== 1st WT20I ===
28 August 2019
19:30 (D/N)
Scorecard

Malaysia; 126/6 (20 overs)	v	Singapore; 104/6 (20 overs)
Ainna Hamizah Hashim 37* (34); Dhavina Sharma 2/30 (4 overs)		Diviya G K 45* (42); Wan Nor Zulaika 2/29 (4 overs)

Malaysia win by 22 runs
Indian Association Ground, Singapore
Umpires: Sathish Balasubramaniam (Sin) and Pramesh Parab (Sin)
Player of the match: Ainna Hamizah Hashim (Mas)

- Singapore won the toss and elected to field.

=== 2nd WT20I ===
29 August 2019
19:30 (D/N)
Scorecard

Singapore; 91/3 (20 overs)	v	Malaysia; 92/1 (13.5 overs)
Rajeshwari Butler 35* (39); Nur Nadihirah 1/6 (3 overs)		Winifred Duraisingam 40* (38); Dhavina Sharma 1/15 (3 overs)

Malaysia won by 9 wickets
Indian Association Ground, Singapore
Umpires: Senthil Kumar (Sin) and Ravi Putcha (Sin)
Player of the match: Winifred Duraisingam (Mas)

- Singapore won the toss and elected to bat.

=== 3rd WT20I ===
30 August 2019
19:30 (D/N)
Scorecard

Malaysia; 140/2 (20 overs)	v	Singapore; 110 (19.5 overs)
Winifred Duraisingam 66* (58); Shafia Hassan 1/27 (4 overs)		Diviya G K 35 (34); Ainna Hamizah Hashim 2/10 (4 overs)

Malaysia won by 30 runs
Indian Association Ground, Singapore
Umpires: Foyej Ahmed (Sin) and Dharmalingam Suresh (Sin)
Player of the match: Winifred Duraisingam (Mas)

- Malaysia won the toss and elected to bat.

Preceded by 2018	Saudari Cup	Succeeded by 2022
