= Cricket in the Philippines =

- Country: Philippines
- Governing body: PCA
- National team: Philippines
- First played: 1913

Club competitions
- Philippine Cricket League

Cricket has been played in the Philippines as early as 1914, and was and still a sport mostly played by expatriates. The sport in the Philippines is governed by the Philippine Cricket Association (PCA).

== Background ==
Cricket was played in the Philippines as early as 1914 when the Nomads Sports Club was established. The Philippines' national sports association for cricket, the Philippine Cricket Association (PCA), would be established by the 1970s. The sport is a game mostly played by expatriates in the Philippines but has gradually gained a local following. The PCA attained affiliate membership in the International Cricket Council (ICC) in 2003.

== Domestic competitions ==
The PCA holds the Philippine Cricket League. The 2014 season had 17 teams across two divisions. Prior to the 1997 Asian financial crisis, the PCA has organized a stable cricket league which is composed of mostly expatriate members.

== Cricket grounds ==
As of 2017, the Emilio Aguinaldo College in Dasmariñas, Cavite host the only suitable cricket ground in the Philippines. The home of the Manila Nomads in Parañaque, Metro Manila had a cricket ground.

== National team ==
The Philippines has both a men's and a women's national team The men's team under the PCA first competed internationally in 2011. The women's team played its first international games in 2019.
