= 2022 Stan Nagaiah Trophy =

International cricket tour

	Singapore	Malaysia
- Dates: 28 – 30 June 2022
Captains	Amjad Mahboob	Ahmad Faiz

Twenty20 International series
- Results: Malaysia won the 3-match series 2–1
Most runs	Janak Prakash (99)	Muhamad Syahadat (76); Syed Aziz (76)
Most wickets	Aryaman Sunil (4)	Anwar Rahman (6)

The 2022 Stan Nagaiah Trophy was a Twenty20 International (T20I) cricket tournament which was held in Singapore in June 2022. The annual Stan Nagaiah Trophy was first contested between Malaysia and Singapore in 1995. This was the first time that the series had been contested since 2018, and the first to be played with T20I status.

The series, played at the Indian Association Ground, provided Singapore with preparation for the 2022 ICC Men's T20 World Cup Global Qualifier B, while Malaysia followed this series by hosting a quadrangular series in July 2022.

Malaysia came from behind after losing the opening match to win the series 2–1. In the final match, which was reduced to 13 overs per side due to rain, player of the match Sharvin Muniandy struck three consecutive sixes in his 26 not out to win the game for Malaysia.

== Squads ==
Singapore	Malaysia
Amjad Mahboob (c); Vinoth Baskaran; Surendran Chandramohan; Aman Desai; Aritra Dutta; Rezza Gaznavi; Neil Karnik; Anantha Krishna; Arjun Mutreja; Navin Param; Janak Prakash; Akshay Puri; Rohan Rangarajan; Manpreet Singh (wk); Aryaman Sunil	Ahmad Faiz (c); Virandeep Singh (vc, wk); Muhammad Amir; Syed Aziz; Ainool Hafizs; Khizar Hayat; Syazrul Idrus; Sharvin Muniandy; Anwar Rahman; Nazril Rahman; Pavandeep Singh; Muhamad Syahadat; Vijay Unni; Muhammad Wafiq; Zubaidi Zulkifle

== T20I series ==
=== 1st T20I ===
28 June 2022
19:30 (N)
Scorecard

Malaysia; 137/7 (20 overs)	v	Singapore; 138/6 (19.5 overs)
Sharvin Muniandy 40 (36); Anantha Krishna 3/18 (4 overs)		Aryaman Sunil 36* (20); Pavandeep Singh 3/13 (4 overs)

Singapore won by 4 wickets
Indian Association Ground, Singapore
Umpires: Hardeep Jadeja (Sin) and Anand Natarajan (Sin)
Player of the match: Aryaman Sunil (Sin)

- Singapore won the toss and elected to field.
- Akshay Puri (Sin) made his T20I debut.

=== 2nd T20I ===
29 June 2022
19:30 (N)
Scorecard

Malaysia; 177/5 (20 overs)	v	Singapore; 154/6 (20 overs)
Syed Aziz 56 (39); Janak Prakash 2/38 (4 overs)		Janak Prakash 56 (31); Anwar Rahman 2/16 (4 overs)

Malaysia won by 23 runs
Indian Association Ground, Singapore
Umpires: Sathish Balasubramaniam (Sin) and Reshanth Selvaratnam (Sin)
Player of the match: Muhamad Syahadat (Mas)

- Malaysia won the toss and elected to bat.

=== 3rd T20I ===
30 June 2022
19:30 (N)
Scorecard

Singapore; 122/7 (13 overs)	v	Malaysia; 125/5 (12.1 overs)
Surendran Chandramohan 45 (26); Anwar Rahman 3/15 (2 overs)		Sharvin Muniandy 26* (9); Aryaman Sunil 3/33 (3 overs)

Malaysia won by 5 wickets
Indian Association Ground, Singapore
Umpires: Senthil Kumar (Sin) and Pramesh Parab (Sin)
Player of the match: Sharvin Muniandy (Mas)

- Singapore won the toss and elected to bat.
- The match was reduced to 13 overs per side due to rain.
- Aman Desai (Sin) made his T20I debut.
