= AZ Group Cricket Oval =

Cricket stadium

Ground information
- Location: Phnom Penh, Cambodia
- Country: Cambodia
- Establishment: 2023
- Tenants: Cambodia national cricket team Cambodia women's national cricket team

International information
- First men's T20I: 1 May 2023: Indonesia v Thailand
- Last men's T20I: 11 May 2023: Cambodia v Malaysia
- First women's T20I: 30 April 2023: Cambodia v Singapore
- Last women's T20I: 15 May 2023: Indonesia v Thailand
- As of 17 May 2023; Source: Cricinfo

AZ Group Cricket Oval is a cricket stadium located at Phnom Penh in Cambodia. It hosted the cricket tournament during the 2023 Southeast Asian Games.

== History ==
A Memorandum of Understanding (MoU) was signed by Cricket Federation Cambodia Association and AZ Group to assist and promote Cambodia for the cricket tournament in 2023 Southeast Asian Games. The memorandum also provided AZ Group to be the long-term partner for the cricket federation.

Vath Chamroeun, the President of Cricket Federation Cambodia Association, signed the memorandum and said that the National Organising Committee of 2023 Southeast Asian Games as well as the cricket federation were thankful to AZ Group for helping in construction of a "clean and environmental friendly" ground.

The ground has a bowler-friendly surface, which particularly favours the pacers.

From April to May 2023, this ground hosted cricket in the Southeast Asian Games which was played in four different formats for both men and women - 50-overs, T20, T10 and 6-a-side cricket. During this tournament, they hosted the first men's Twenty20 International matches played in Cambodia.

== List of centuries ==
=== Men's Twenty20 Internationals ===
Score	Player	Team	Opposing team	Date	Result
116*	Virandeep Singh	Malaysia	Indonesia	2 May 2023	Won
100*	Anish Paraam	Singapore	Philippines	3 May 2023	Won

== List of five-wicket hauls ==
=== Women's Twenty20 Internationals ===
Player	Date	Team	Opposing team	Figures	Result
Phoup Srey Pheak	21 December 2022	Cambodia	Philippines	6/9	Won
Ada Bhasin	8 February 2023	Singapore	Cambodia	5/6	Won
Ainna Hamizah Hashim	14 May 2023	Malaysia	Myanmar	5/4	Won
