= List of Cambodia Twenty20 International cricketers =

This is a list of Cambodian Twenty20 International cricketers.

In April 2018, the ICC decided to grant full Twenty20 International (T20I) status to all its members. Cambodia were awarded Associate Membership of the ICC in July 2022. Therefore, all Twenty20 matches played between Cambodia and other ICC members after 1 January 2019 will be eligible to have T20I status. Cambodia played their first matches with T20I status during the Southeast Asian Games in Phnom Penh in May 2023.

This list comprises all members of the Cambodia cricket team who have played at least one T20I match for the country. It is initially arranged in the order in which each player won his first Twenty20 cap. Where more than one player won his first Twenty20 cap in the same match, those players are listed alphabetically by surname.

== Key ==
General

- ‡ – Captain
- † – Wicket-keeper
- First – Year of debut
- Last – Year of latest game
- Mat – Number of matches played

Batting

- Runs – Runs scored in career
- HS – Highest score
- 50 – Half-centuries scored
- 100 – Centuries scored
- Avg – Runs scored per dismissal
- * – Batsman remained not out

Bowling

- Balls – Balls bowled in career
- Wkt – Wickets taken in career
- BBI – Best bowling in an innings
- Ave – Average runs per wicket

Fielding

- Ca – Catches taken
- St – Stumpings affected

== List of players ==
Statistics are correct as of 29 December 2025.

Cambodia T20I cricketers
General					Batting					Bowling				Fielding		Ref
No.	Name	First	Last	Mat	Runs	HS	Avg	50	100	Balls	Wkt	BBI	Ave	Ca	St	Ref
1	Etienne Beukes‡	2023	2025	43	571	39	22.84	0	0	243	9	2/25	35.22	17	0	
2	Mahaj Chadha†	2023	2025	17	488	74	40.66	3	0	96	8	2/21	18.12	18	1	
3	Sharwan Godara	2023	2025	24	181	36*	22.62	0	0	489	33	4/5	17.45	9	0	
4	Uday Hathinjar†	2023	2025	36	591	74*	17.38	4	0	78	7	3/21	15.28	16	3	
5	Lakshit Gupta	2023	2025	35	700	62	23.33	3	0	96	3	1/19	48.00	9	0	
6	Luqman Butt‡	2023	2025	45	1,239	80*	35.60	6	0	661	28	4/40	30.46	16	0	
7	Gulam Murtaza	2023	2025	44	148	28	8.70	0	0	821	42	5/24	25.42	12	0	
8	Anish Prasad	2023	2024	22	25	8*	6.25	0	0	29	0	–	–	4	0	
9	Salvin Stanly	2023	2025	27	201	25*	9.57	0	0	115	6	2/8	28.83	11	0	
10	Ram Sharan	2023	2024	22	374	86*	18.70	2	0	305	12	3/14	30.41	6	0	
11	Utkarsh Jain	2023	2025	27	87	24*	14.50	0	0	559	30	3/21	18.56	10	0	
12	Phon Bunthean	2023	2025	15	0	0*	–	0	0	–	–	–	–	1	0	
13	Te Senglong	2023	2025	3	0	0	0.00	0	0	–	–	–	–	0	0	
14	Manish Sharma‡	2023	2024	10	20	15	5.00	0	0	54	3	2/25	24.66	1	0	
15	Shah Abrar Hussain	2023	2025	29	358	74*	22.37	1	0	439	21	3/17	26.33	6	0	
16	Pandara Shoufeer	2023	2023	6	0	0*	–	0	0	–	–	–	–	0	0	
17	Sivakumar	2023	2023	6	5	3*	–	0	0	–	–	–	–	1	0	
18	Asanka Gunarathne	2024	2024	3	4	3	2.00	0	0	–	–	–	–	0	0	
19	Vimukthi Viraj	2024	2024	4	30	22	7.50	0	0	30	2	2/32	32.00	0	0	
20	Nived Gireesh	2024	2025	23	28	14	4.66	0	0	132	9	3/21	20.66	2	0	
21	Marcelle Hanekom	2025	2025	9	118	33	14.75	0	0	126	6	2/20	29.66	2	0	
22	Mongdara Sok	2025	2025	9	2	1*	1.00	0	0	–	–	–	–	0	0	
23	Muhammad Naeem†	2025	2025	9	70	46*	10.00	0	0	–	–	–	–	4	0	
24	Nirmaljit Singh	2025	2025	9	21	7*	7.00	0	0	–	–	–	–	0	0	
25	Pel Vannak	2025	2025	8	0	0	0.00	0	0	–	–	–	–	1	0	
26	Chanthoeun Rathanak	2025	2025	4	0	0	0.00	0	0	–	–	–	–	0	0	
27	Md Shuayeb	2025	2025	6	6	5	3.00	0	0	36	4	2/13	12.50	3	0	
