= 2018 Saudari Cup =

	Malaysia women	Singapore women
- Dates: 9 – 12 August 2018
Captains	Emylia Eliani	Diviya G K

Twenty20 International series
- Results: Malaysia women won the 6-match series 4–2
Most runs	Wan Julia (135)	Diviya G K (121)
Most wickets	Emylia Eliani (10)	Diviya G K (8)

The 2018 Saudari Cup was contested between the women's national teams of Malaysia and Singapore from 9 to 12 August 2018. The Saudari cup is an annual event between the two sides, which started in 2014, and had been won by Malaysia in each of the first three editions. All three previous tournaments were won 2–1 by Malaysia, including the most recent which was played in Johor in 2016. The tournament was contested over six Women's Twenty20 International (WT20I) matches, with the first five matches played at the Selangor Turf Club in Kuala Lumpur and the final match played at the UKM-YSD Cricket Oval in Bangi.

Following the International Cricket Council's decision to grant T20I status to all matches played between women's sides of Associate Members after 1 July 2018, this edition had this enhanced status. Singapore women played their first matches with WT20I status during this series.

Malaysia won the series 4–2, although it is also reported as two separate series (one for 2017 and one for 2018) both of which Malaysia won 2–1.

== T20I series ==
=== 1st WT20I ===
9 August 2018
Scorecard

Malaysia; 136/3 (20 overs)	v	Singapore; 98/6 (20 overs)
Emylia Eliani 34 (34); Diviya G K 1/6 (4 overs)		Samantha Singham 26* (35); Ainna Hamizah Hashim 2/10 (3 overs)

Malaysia won by 38 runs
Selangor Turf Club, Kuala Lumpur
Umpires: Nur Hijrah (Mas) and Denish Sevakumaran (Mas)
Player of the match: Emylia Eliani (Mas)

- Singapore won the toss and elected to field.
- Nur Alliah Asyqin, Emylia Eliani, Jennifer Francis, Nur Natasya Nazira, Nor Syahira (Mas), Rajeshwari Butler, Haresh Dhavina, Diviya G K, Shafia Hassan, Alow Ci Hui, Shafina Mahesh, Neisha Pratt, Roshni Seth, Samantha Singham and Vathana Sreemurugavel (Sin) all made their WT20I debuts.

=== 2nd WT20I ===
9 August 2018 (D/N)
Scorecard

Singapore; 95/5 (20 overs)	v	Malaysia; 96/4 (15.3 overs)
Neisha Pratt 48 (51); Emylia Eliani 3/13 (4 overs)		Wan Julia 45* (47); Alow Ci Hui 2/15 (2 overs)

Malaysia won by 6 wickets
Selangor Turf Club, Kuala Lumpur
Umpires: Nur Hijrah (Mas) and Denish Sevakumaran (Mas)
Player of the match: Wan Julia (Mas)

- Singapore won the toss and elected to bat.
- Nik Nur Atiela and Wan Nor Zulaika (Mas) both made their WT20I debuts.

=== 3rd WT20I ===
10 August 2018
Scorecard

Singapore; 127/4 (20 overs)	v	Malaysia; 98/7 (20 overs)
Haresh Dhavina 34* (58); Amalin Sorfina 1/7 (1 over)		Nur Dania Aqeelah 31* (31); Diviya G K 2/7 (4 overs)

Singapore won by 29 runs
Selangor Turf Club, Kuala Lumpur
Umpires: Nur Hijrah (Mas) and Denish Sevakumaran (Mas)
Player of the match: Haresh Dhavina (Sin)

- Singapore won the toss and elected to bat.
- Nur Dania Aqeelah, Aisya Eleesa, Fatin Nazirah, Amalin Sorfina, Nurul Syahira (Mas), Ramandeep Chetan, Vigineswari Pasupathy, Nandita Sharma and Jacinta Si Ping (Sin) all made their WT20I debuts.

=== 4th WT20I ===
10 August 2018 (D/N)
Scorecard

Malaysia; 125/3 (20 overs)	v	Singapore; 127/5 (19.4 overs)
Yusrina Yaakop 38 (43); Diviya G K 1/13 (4 overs)		Diviya G K 77* (63); Emylia Eliani 2/28 (3.4 overs)

Singapore won by 5 wickets
Selangor Turf Club, Kuala Lumpur
Umpires: Nur Hijrah (Mas) and Denish Sevakumaran (Mas)
Player of the match: Diviya G K (Sin)

- Singapore won the toss and elected to field.

=== 5th WT20I ===
11 August 2018
Scorecard

Malaysia; 99/7 (20 overs)	v	Singapore; 73 (18 overs)
Wan Julia 36 (47); Diviya G K 3/8 (4 overs)		Samantha Singham 22 (39); Aisya Eleesa 3/11 (2 overs)

Malaysia won by 26 runs
Selangor Turf Club, Kuala Lumpur
Umpires: Nur Hijrah (Mas) and Venukumar Ramasamy (Mas)
Player of the match: Aisya Eleesa (Mas)

- Malaysia won the toss and elected to bat.

=== 6th WT20I ===
12 August 2018 (D/N)
Scorecard

Singapore; 94/7 (20 overs)	v	Malaysia; 95/6 (16 overs)
Samantha Singham 24* (33); Emylia Eliani 3/13 (4 overs)		Wan Julia 19 (23); Haresh Dhavina 3/17 (4 overs)

Malaysia won by 4 wickets
UKM-YSD Cricket Oval, Bangi
Umpires: Nur Hijrah (Mas) and Denish Sevakumaran (Mas)
Player of the match: Emylia Eliani (Mas)

- Malaysia won the toss and elected to field.

Preceded by	Saudari Cup	Succeeded by 2019
