= Myanmar women's cricket team in Singapore and Indonesia in 2018–19 =

The Myanmar women's cricket team toured Singapore and Indonesia in April 2019 for a total of five Women's Twenty20 International (WT20I) matches, playing three WT20I matches in Singapore followed by two in Indonesia.

== Singapore ==
Myanmar women's cricket team in Singapore in 2018–19
	Singapore women	Myanmar women
- Dates: 18 – 20 April 2019
Captains	Shafina Mahesh	Zar Win

Twenty20 International series
- Results: Myanmar women won the 3-match series 2–0
Most runs	Smruthi Radhakrishnan (21)	Khin Myat (90)
Most wickets	Diviya G K (2); Toh Wang Lin (2)	Lin Htun (3); Zon Lin (3)

The first leg of Myanmar's tour was a trip to Singapore to play three (WT20I) matches at the Indian Association Ground. The series took place from 18 to 20 April 2019. Myanmar won the series 2-0, with the third match abandoned after the toss had been won by Singapore. This was the first time that Singapore had hosted a WT20I series.

=== W20I series ===
==== 1st WT20I ====
18 April 2019 (D/N)
Scorecard

Singapore; 60/9 (20 overs)	v	Myanmar; 61/0 (7.3 overs)
Piumi Gurusinghe 11 (19); Lin Htun 3/10		Khin Myat 33* (27)

Myanmar won by 10 wickets
Indian Association Ground, Singapore
Umpires: Ravi Putcha (Sin) and Mosur Ramesh (Sin)
Player of the match: Khin Myat (Mya)

- Myanmar won the toss and elected to field.
- Lucky Gautam, Piumi Gurusinghe, Amna Jamal, Swati Kapila and Smruthi Radhakrishnan (Sin) all made their WT20I debuts.

==== 2nd WT20I ====
19 April 2019 (D/N)
Scorecard

Myanmar; 135/7 (20 overs)	v	Singapore; 86/9 (20 overs)
Khin Myat 57 (52); Diviya G K 2/15 (4 overs)		Smruthi Radhakrishnan 18 (26); Zon Lin 1/14 (2 overs)

Myanmar won by 49 runs
Indian Association Ground, Singapore
Umpires: Ravichandran Abiraman (Sin) and Balraj Manikandan (Sin)
Player of the match: Khin Myat (Mya)

- Singapore won the toss and elected to field.
- Ishita Shukla (Sin) made her WT20I debut.

==== 3rd WT20I ====
20 April 2019 (D/N)
Scorecard

Singapore	v	Myanmar

No result
Indian Association Ground, Singapore
Umpires: Senthil Kumar (Sin) and Reshanth Selvaratnam (Sin)

- Singapore won the toss and elected to bat.
- No play was possible due to rain.
- Sanika Sonpethkar (Sin) made her WT20I debut.

== Indonesia ==
Myanmar women's cricket team in Indonesia in 2018–19
	Indonesia women	Myanmar women
- Dates: 21 – 28 April 2019
Captains	Yulia Anggraeni	Zar Win

Twenty20 International series
- Results: Indonesia women won the 2-match series 2–0
Most runs	Ni Putu Ayu Nanda Sakarini (92)	May San (27)
Most wickets	Ni Kadek Fitria Rada Rani (5)	Zon Lin (3)

The second leg of the tour saw the Myanmar team travel to Indonesia to play in the Kartini Cup at the Udayana Cricket Ground in Bali. The series took place from 21 to 28 April 2019 and also saw a number of local club sides competing alongside the women's national teams of Indonesia and Myanmar. The two matches between the national sides in the group stage were granted WT20I status. Indonesia won both of these matches by comfortable margins of 73 and 63 runs, respectively.

=== WT20I series ===
==== 1st WT20I ====
23 April 2019
Scorecard

Indonesia; 133/5 (20 overs)	v	Myanmar; 60 (16 overs)
Ni Putu Ayu Nanda Sakarini 65* (53); Zon Lin 3/22 (4 overs)		Khin Myat 22 (28); Ni Kadek Fitria Rada Rani 4/11 (4 overs)

Indonesia won by 73 runs
Udayana Cricket Ground, Bali
Umpires: Bernaclus Elli (Ina) and Kadek Gamantika (Ina)

- Indonesia won the toss and elected to bat.
- Taskia Hanum (Ina) made her WT20I debut.

==== 2nd WT20I ====
25 April 2019
Scorecard

Indonesia; 152/2 (20 overs)	v	Myanmar; 89/7 (20 overs)
Anak Bastari 57* (56); Theint Soe 1/18 (2 overs)		May San 25 (32); Netty Sitompul 2/7 (4 overs)

Indonesia won by 63 runs
Udayana Cricket Ground, Bali
Umpires: Prakash Vijaykumar (Ina) and Yousuf Wadu (Ina)

- Indonesia won the toss and elected to bat.
- Anak Bastari (Ina) made her WT20I debut.
