= Daniel Jakiel =

Zimbabwe-born Malawi cricketer (born 1990)

Personal information
- Born: 14 November 1990 (age 35); Harare, Zimbabwe
- Batting: Right-handed
- Bowling: Right-arm fast-medium

International information
- National sides: Zimbabwe (2019); Malawi (2022–present)
- T20I debut (cap 56/23): 1 October 2019; Zimbabwe v Nepal
- Last T20I: 4 October 2025; Malawi v Botswana

Domestic team information
- Years: Team
- 2018/19–present: Mashonaland Eagles

Career statistics
Competition	T20I	FC	LA	T20
Matches	46	2	13	56
Runs scored	210	3	30	215
Batting average	12.35	0.75	6.00	10.75
100s/50s	0/0	0/0	0/0	0/0
Top score	38*	3	19	38*
Balls bowled	942	216	495	1098
Wickets	53	2	26	58
Bowling average	21.39	56.50	16.57	23.96
5 wickets in innings	1	0	2	1
10 wickets in match	–	0	–	–
Best bowling	5/11	1/48	6/26	5/11
Catches/stumpings	12/–	0/–	1/–	13/–
- Source: Cricinfo, 16 October 2025

Daniel Jakiel (born 14 November 1990) is a Zimbabwean-born cricketer who currently represents the Malawi national team. He made his List A debut for Mashonaland Eagles in the 2018–19 Pro50 Championship on 23 February 2019. He was the leading wicket-taker in the tournament, with thirteen dismissals in four matches. He made his Twenty20 debut for Mashonaland Eagles in the 2018–19 Stanbic Bank 20 Series on 11 March 2019.

In September 2019, he was named in Zimbabwe's Twenty20 International (T20I) squad for the 2019–20 Singapore Tri-Nation Series. He made his T20I debut for Zimbabwe, against Nepal, in the Singapore Tri-Nation Series on 1 October 2019.

In December 2020, he was selected to play for the Eagles in the 2020–21 Logan Cup. He made his first-class debut on 31 January 2022, for Eagles in the 2021–22 Logan Cup in Zimbabwe. In September 2022, he was named in Malawi's T20I squad for the 2022 ACA Africa T20 Cup. He made his T20I debut for Malawi against Cameroon on 15 September 2022.
