= William Mashinge =

Zimbabwean cricketer (born 1996)

William Takudzwa Mashinge
Personal information
- Full name: William Takudzwa Mashinge
- Born: 6 October 1996 (age 30); Marondera, Zimbabwe
- Nickname: Hindias
- Batting: Right-handed
- Bowling: Right-arm fast-medium

International information
- National side: Zimbabwe
- T20I debut (cap 57): 1 October 2019 v Nepal
- Last T20I: 3 October 2019 v Singapore

Domestic team information
- Years: Team
- 2016: Mountaineers
- Source: CricketArchive, 3 October 2019

William Takudzwa Mashinge (born 6 October 1996) is a Zimbabwean cricketer who has represented the Mountaineers in Zimbabwean domestic cricket. He is an all-rounder who bowls right-arm fast-medium and bats right-handed.

Mashinge was born in Marondera, in Zimbabwe's Mashonaland East Province. He made his first-class debut in January 2016, aged 19, playing for the Mountaineers against the Mid West Rhinos in the Logan Cup. Later in the year, Mashinge was selected in the Zimbabwe under-19s squad for the 2016 Under-19 World Cup in Bangladesh. He played in all six of his team's matches, scoring 127 runs (the third-most for Zimbabwe) but taking just two wickets. In the ninth-place play-off against Afghanistan, he top-scored for Zimbabwe with 66 runs from 92 balls.

He made his Twenty20 debut for Zimbabwe against Free State in the 2016 Africa T20 Cup on 9 September 2016. In February 2017, he was named in an academy squad by Zimbabwe Cricket to tour England later that year. He made his List A debut for Mountaineers in the 2018–19 Pro50 Championship on 8 December 2018.

In September 2019, he was named in Zimbabwe's Twenty20 International (T20I) squad for the 2019–20 Singapore Tri-Nation Series. He made his T20I debut for Zimbabwe, against Nepal, in the Singapore Tri-Nation Series on 1 October 2019.

In December 2020, he was selected to play for the Southern Rocks in the 2020–21 Logan Cup.
