= 2017 ICC World Cricket League East Asia-Pacific Region Qualifiers =

2017 ICC World Cricket League East Asia-Pacific Region Division One
- Dates: 19 – 25 February 2017
- Administrator(s): International Cricket Council
- Cricket format: Limited-overs (50 overs)
- Tournament format(s): Round-robin and Knockout
- Host(s): Australia
- Champions: Vanuatu
- Participants: 6

The 2017 ICC World Cricket League East Asia-Pacific Region Qualifiers was an international cricket tournament that took place in Bendigo, Australia. The teams competing in the tournament are Vanuatu, Fiji, Indonesia, Japan, Philippines and Samoa. The winner of the qualifiers progressed to ICC WCL Division 5 which will be staged in September 2017.

== Teams ==
Six teams invited by ICC for the tournament:

- Vanuatu
- Fiji
- Indonesia
- Japan
- Philippines
- Samoa

== Points table ==
Team	P	W	L	T	NR	Points	NRR	Qualification
Vanuatu	5	5	0	0	0	10	+2.935	2017 ICC World Cricket League Division Five
Fiji	5	4	1	0	0	8	+1.050	
Samoa	5	3	2	0	0	6	+0.340	
Philippines	5	2	3	0	0	4	-0.580	
Indonesia	5	1	4	0	0	2	-1.927	
Japan	5	0	5	0	0	0	-1.642	

Source: Cricinfo
