= Luqman Butt =

Pakistani cricketer (born 1994)

Personal information
- Born: 24 December 1994 (age 31); Gujranwala, Punjab, Pakistan
- Batting: Right-handed
- Bowling: Right-arm medium fast

International information
- National side: Cambodia (2023-present)
- T20I debut (cap 6): 4 May 2023 v Singapore
- Last T20I: 16 June 2025 v Indonesia

Domestic team information
- Years: Team
- 2013/14: Zarai Taraqiati Bank Limited
- 2014/15–2017/18: Khan Research Laboratories
- 2018: Zarai Taraqiati Bank Limited

Career statistics
Competition	FC	LA	T20I	T20
Matches	24	29	36	37
Runs scored	1002	444	1049	1051
Batting average	24.43	19.30	38.85	38.92
100s/50s	1/5	0/1	0/6	0/6
Top score	111	79	80*	80*
Balls bowled	382	270	553	559
Wickets	4	5	25	25
Bowling average	51.75	58.80	29.56	29.88
5 wickets in innings	0	0	0	0
10 wickets in match	0	0	0	0
Best bowling	2/47	2/32	4/40	4/40
Catches/stumpings	31/–	6/–	15/–	16/–
Medal record
Representing Cambodia
Men's Cricket
SEA Games
Gold medal – first place	2023 Phnom Penh	50 over
- Source: ESPNcricinfo, 23 October 2025

Luqman Butt (Punjabi/Urdu: لقمان بٹ; born 24 December 1994) is a Pakistani cricketer who plays international cricket for Cambodia.

== Career ==
He has represented Pakistani cricket teams Zarai Taraqiati Bank Limited and Khan Research Laboratories during his career.

Butt made his international debut for Cambodia against Singapore in the 2023 SEA Games and was named the team's captain for the tournament and led his team to the gold medal. He was nominated player of the match in five games during the tournament.
