= Utsav Rakshit =

Singaporean cricketer

Personal information
- Full name: Utsav Rakshit
- Role: Wicket-keeper

International information
- National side: Singapore
Medal record
Representing Singapore
Men's Cricket
Southeast Asian Games
Gold medal – first place	2023 Cambodia	6s
Bronze medal – third place	2023 Cambodia	T10
Bronze medal – third place	2023 Cambodia	T20
- Source: Cricinfo, 26 September 2019

Utsav Rakshit is a Singaporean cricketer. He represented Singapore at the 2017 ICC World Cricket League Division Three tournament held in Entebbe, Uganda. In September 2019, he was named in Singapore's squad for the 2019–20 Singapore Tri-Nation Series tournament against Zimbabwe and Nepal.
