= Cambodia national cricket team =

National cricket team

Cambodia
- Cambodia
- Association: Cricket Association of Cambodia

Personnel
- Captain: Ghulam Murtaza Chughtai
- Coach: Nirmaljit Singh

International Cricket Council
- ICC status: Associate member (2022)
- ICC region: Asia
ICC Rankings	Current	Best-ever
T20I	60th	38th (09-Feb-24)

T20 Internationals
- First T20I: v Singapore at AZ Group Cricket Oval, Phnom Penh; 4 May 2023
- Last T20I: v Indonesia at Udayana Cricket Ground, Jimbaran; 29 December 2025
T20Is	Played	Won/Lost
Total	45	16/27 (0 ties, 2 no results)
This year	0	0/0 (0 ties, 0 no results)
- As of 29 December 2025

The Cambodia men's national cricket team represents the country of Cambodia in international cricket competitions.

Cricket in the former French colony of Cambodia is still a mainly expatriate game at senior level, although the sport is growing amongst younger Cambodians. A structured cricket league is being planned with the help of the Thailand Cricket League with both the National Stadium, Phnom Penh and the Army Stadium being available for matches.

== History ==
Cambodia applied for Asian Cricket Council membership, which was granted in 2012. The Association became a member of the National Olympic Committee of Cambodia in 2011 and were granted full membership of the Olympic Committee in 2021.

Construction of a cricket ground 10 km from Phnom Penh began in 2014.

The team played its first international match on the Kinrara Oval ground in Malaysia against a Malaysian Development Squad in 2019.

In March 2020, the Cambodia Cricket Association announced that a Cambodia Board XI team would tour Singapore in April 2020 to play three T20 matches, to prepare for Associate membership of the International Cricket Council. Due to COVID-19, the tour was postponed to May 2022.

The Cricket Association of Cambodia was established in 2021 as the legal governing body of the sport in the country. Most of the association's board members are local Cambodians.

=== Associate membership (2022–present) ===
Cambodia applied for ICC membership in 2021. In July 2022, Cambodia was awarded Associate membership status by ICC.

Cambodia hosted the 2023 Southeast Asian Games, with cricket included as a sport.

4 May 2023
10:30
Scorecard

Cambodia; 181/7 (20 overs)	v	Singapore; 166 (19.5 overs)
Luqman Butt 49 (23); Adwitya Bhargava 4/19 (4 overs)		Raoul Sharma 42 (24); Uday Hathinjar 3/21 (4 overs)

Cambodia won by 15 runs
AZ Group Cricket Oval, Phnom Penh
Umpires: Samad Akbar (Tha) and Riaz Ur Rahman (Idn)
Player of the match: Luqman Butt (Cam)

- Cambodia won the toss and elected to bat.
- First ever men's T20I match for Cambodia.
- Etienne Beukes, Luqman Butt, Mahaj Chadha, Sharwan Godara, Lakshit Gupta, Uday Hathinjar, Utkarsh Jain, Gulam Murtaza, Anish Prasad, Ram Sharan and Salvin Stanly (Cam) all made their T20I debuts.

The Cambodian squad at the 2023 Southeast Games contained "an influx of players of varying pedigree and experience from the Indian subcontinent", with allegations made that players were issued Cambodian passports days before the start of the tournament and that players were ineligible under ICC rules.

== Tournament history ==
=== ACC Men's Challenger Cup ===
- 2024: Runners-up

=== ACC Men's Premier Cup ===
ACC Premier Cup record
Year	Round	Position	GP	W	L	T	NR
(Nepal) 2023	Did not participate						
(Oman) 2024	Group stage	10th	4	0	4	0	0
Total	1/2	0 Titles	0	0	4	0	0

=== Southeast Asian Games ===
- Gold medal (3): 2023

== Records and statistics ==
International Match Summary — Cambodia

Last updated 29 December 2025

Playing Record
Format	M	W	L	T	NR	Inaugural Match
Twenty20 Internationals	45	16	27	0	2	4 May 2023

=== Twenty20 Internationals ===
- Highest team total: 182/5 v. Philippines on 10 May 2023 at AZ Group Cricket Oval, Phnom Penh.
- Highest individual score: 86*, Ram Sharan v. Indonesia on 21 November 2023 at Udayana Cricket Ground, Jimbaran.
- Best individual bowling figures: 4/5, Sharwan Godara v. China on 28 January 2024 at Terdthai Cricket Ground, Bangkok.

T20I record versus other nations

Records complete to T20I #3658. Last updated 29 December 2025.

Opponent	M	W	L	T	NR	First match	First win
Associate Members
Bahrain	2	0	2	0	0	16 April 2024	
Bhutan	2	2	0	0	0	5 February 2024	5 February 2024
China	1	1	0	0	0	28 January 2024	28 January 2024
Hong Kong	1	0	1	0	0	28 September 2023	
Indonesia	24	8	14	0	2	20 November 2023	21 November 2023
Japan	1	0	1	0	0	27 September 2023	
Kuwait	1	0	1	0	0	13 April 2024	
Malaysia	1	1	0	0	0	11 May 2023	11 May 2023
Myanmar	1	1	0	0	0	27 January 2024	27 January 2024
Oman	1	0	1	0	0	14 April 2024	
Philippines	1	1	0	0	0	10 May 2023	10 May 2023
Qatar	1	0	1	0	0	23 November 2024	
Saudi Arabia	3	0	3	0	0	1 February 2024	
Singapore	2	2	0	0	0	4 May 2023	4 May 2023
Thailand	1	0	1	0	0	20 November 2024	
United Arab Emirates	2	0	2	0	0	17 April 2024	

== See also ==
- List of Cambodia Twenty20 International cricketers
- Cambodia women's national cricket team
