= Sushan Bhari =

Nepalese cricketer

Personal information
- Born: 6 March 1995 (age 31); Palpa, Nepal
- Batting: Left-handed
- Bowling: Slow left arm orthodox
- Role: Bowler

International information
- National side: Nepal
- ODI debut (cap 20): 5 February 2020 v Oman
- Last ODI: 11 June 2022 v USA
- T20I debut (cap 29): 28 September 2019 v Singapore
- Last T20I: 22 April 2021 v Malaysia
Medal record
Representing Nepal
Men's Cricket
South Asian Games
| Bronze medal – third place | 2019 Kathmandu/Pokhara | Team |
- Source: Cricinfo, 11 June 2022

Sushan Bhari (born 6 March 1995) is a Nepalese cricketer. He made his List A debut against Hong Kong in the 2015–17 ICC World Cricket League Championship on 13 October 2017. In September 2019, he was named in Nepal's Twenty20 International (T20I) squads for their tours to Singapore and Oman. He made his T20I debut against Singapore, in the Singapore Tri-Nation Series on 28 September 2019.

In November 2019, he was named in Nepal's squad for the 2019 ACC Emerging Teams Asia Cup in Bangladesh. Later the same month, he was also named in Nepal's squad for the men's cricket tournament at the 2019 South Asian Games. The Nepal team won the bronze medal, after they beat the Maldives by five wickets in the third-place playoff match.

In January 2020, he was named in Nepal's One Day International (ODI) squad for the 2020 Nepal Tri-Nation Series. He made his ODI debut for Nepal, against Oman, on 5 February 2020. In September 2020, he was one of eighteen cricketers to be awarded with a central contract by the Cricket Association of Nepal.
