= Henry Tyler (cricketer) =

Filipino cricketer (born 1992)

Personal information
- Full name: Henry Ernest Roy Tyler
- Born: 1 February 1992 (age 34)
- Batting: Right-handed

International information
- National side: Philippines
- T20I debut (cap 11): 22 March 2019 v PNG
- Last T20I: 18 May 2026 v Fiji
Medal record
Men's cricket
Representing the Philippines
Southeast Asian Games
Silver medal – second place	2025 Thailand	Men's T20
Silver medal – second place	2025 Thailand	Men's T10
- Source: Cricinfo, 27 September 2025

Henry Ernest Roy Tyler (born 1 February 1992) is a Filipino cricketer who plays for the Philippines cricket team. In March 2019, he was named in the Philippines squad for the Regional Finals of the 2018–19 ICC T20 World Cup East Asia-Pacific Qualifier tournament. It was in this tournament that, like several of his teammates, he made his Twenty20 International (T20I) debut against Papua New Guinea on 22 March 2019.

In January 2022, he was named head coach of the Philippines national team. The following month, he was named in the Philippines' team for the 2022 ICC Men's T20 World Cup Global Qualifier A tournament in Oman.
