= Elsa Hunter =

Australian-Malaysian cricketer (born 2005)

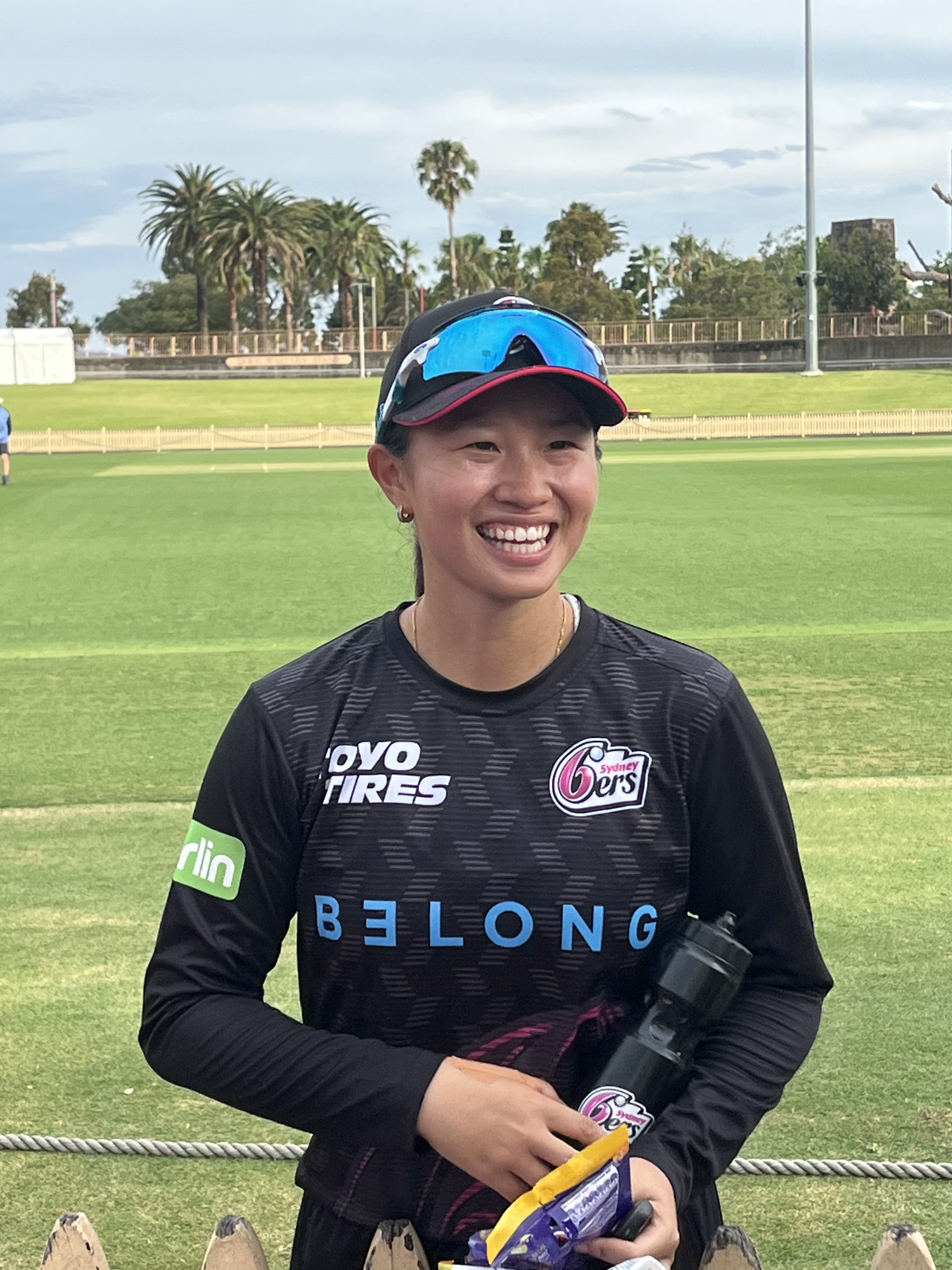

Personal information
- Full name: Elsa Siow Tzin Yee
- Born: 15 February 2005 (age 21); Kuala Lumpur, Malaysia
- Batting: Right-handed
- Bowling: Right-arm medium
- Role: Batter

International information
- National side: Malaysia
- T20I debut (cap 27): 13 January 2019 v Nepal
- Last T20I: 22 May 2026 v Nepal

Career statistics
Competition	T20I	List A	T20
Matches	45	13	54
Runs scored	709	277	825
Batting average	21.48	21.30	20.62
100s/50s	0/3	0/1	0/3
Top score	69*	93	69*
Balls bowled	36	–	36
Wickets	1	–	1
Bowling average	40.00	–	40.00
5 wickets in innings	0	–	0
10 wickets in match	0	–	0
Best bowling	1/27	–	1/27
Catches/stumpings	14/-	6/–	17/–
- Source: ESPNCricinfo, 8 October 2024

Elsa Hunter (born 15 February 2005), also known as Elsa Siow Tzin Yee, is an Australian–Malaysian cricketer who plays for the Malaysian women's national cricket team. She made her T20I debut at the age of 13, against Nepal in the 2019 Thailand Women's T20 Smash.

Hunter moved to Australia in 2015. She resides at Western Sydney and trains at Penrith. Along with playing club cricket at Sydney, she also played for the New South Wales Under-19 women's team.

On a trip to Malaysia, Hunter's father contacted the CEO of Malaysian Cricket Association to suggest training for her daughter. After showing a video of how her daughter played the game, Hunter was immediately selected in the national team. She made her debut in the 2019 Thailand Women's T20 Smash at the age of thirteen, holding the record for the youngest international cricketer at that time, male or female.

She scored her maiden Women's Twenty20 International fifty against Singapore in the 2022 Saudari Cup. She represented Malaysia in the 2022 Women's Asia Cup.
