= Sasha Azmi =

Malaysian cricketer (born 2001)

Personal information
- Full name: Sasha Azmi
- Born: 15 August 2001 (age 25)
- Batting: Right-handed
- Bowling: Right-arm medium-fast
- Relatives: Zumika Azmi (elder sister)

International information
- National side: Malaysia
- T20I debut (cap 9): 3 June 2018 v India
- Last T20I: 9 October 2022 v Thailand

Career statistics
| Competition | WT20I |
|---|---|
| Matches | 27 |
| Runs scored | 63 |
| Batting average | 7.87 |
| 100s/50s | 0/0 |
| Top score | 16* |
| Balls bowled | 493 |
| Wickets | 26 |
| Bowling average | 14.19 |
| 5 wickets in innings | 0 |
| 10 wickets in match | 0 |
| Best bowling | 4/20 |
| Catches/stumpings | 5/– |
Medal record
Representing Malaysia
Women's Cricket
Southeast Asian Games
| Bronze medal – third place | 2017 Kuala Lumpur | Twenty20 |
- Source: ESPNCricinfo, 29 October 2023

Sasha Azmi (born 15 August 2001) is a Malaysian cricketer, who plays for the national women's cricket team. She made her Women's Twenty20 International (WT20I) debut for Malaysia on 3 June 2018, in the 2018 Women's Twenty20 Asia Cup.

In October 2022, she played for Malaysia in Women's Twenty20 Asia Cup.

Her elder sister Zumika Azmi also played cricket for Malaysia.
