= Philippine Cricket Association =

Sport national governing body

- Sport: Cricket
- Jurisdiction: Philippines
- Abbreviation: PCA
- Affiliation: International Cricket Council
- Affiliation date: 2003
- Regional affiliation: Asian Cricket Council (2025–); ICC East Asia-Pacific (2003–)

Official website
- www.cricketphilippines.com
- (Philippines)

Philippine Cricket Association (PCA), formerly the Philippines Cricket Association, is the official governing body of the sport of cricket in the Philippines. It is also responsible for its national team.

The PCA is Philippines's representative at the International Cricket Council and is an associate member and has been a member of that body since 2003. It is also a member of the East Asia-Pacific Cricket Council. The PCA is a member of the Philippine Olympic Committee since June 2018.

On July 24, 2025, the Philippine Cricket Association joined the Asian Cricket Council (ACC).

== History ==
The history of cricket in the Philippines dates back as early as 1914 when the Nomads Sports Club was established where the sports was first played in the country.

The Philippine Cricket Association (PCA) itself was established by the 1970s. Prior to the 1997 Asian financial crisis, the PCA organized a stable cricket league composed of mostly expatriate members.

In 2000, there were only two regular clubs in the PCA-organized league. Cricketers in the league at that time were mostly expatriates coming from Australia, Britain, India, New Zealand, Pakistan, South Africa and Zimbabwe while some were foreigners with Filipino heritage.

The PCA attained affiliate membership in 2003. In the same year there were only 45 recorded senior players.

The Philippine men's national cricket team under the PCA first competed internationally in 2011.

In 2014, the PCA organized the first official cricket match where one side is mostly composed of local Filipinos. The Philippine Developmental Team augmented by three members of the all-expatriate national team won over the Manila 'Roos, which was composed of Australian expatriate cricketers.

As of May 2018, the PCA was seeking for status as the National Sports Association (NSA) for cricket in the Philippines. It organizes a 24-team men's league, a 4-team women's league and an under-19 competition as of that time. Efforts to gain NSA status ended in June 2018, when the PCA was recognized by the Philippine Olympic Committee as its member.

The PCA is promoting cricket in the country by introducing the sport in schools as well as bringing in foreign-based Filipino cricketers abroad.

== See also ==
- Philippines national cricket team
- Philippines women's national cricket team
