= Zumika Azmi =

Malaysian cricketer (born 1998)

Personal information
- Full name: Zumika Azmi
- Born: 19 June 1998 (age 28)
- Batting: Right-handed
- Bowling: Right-arm offbreak
- Relatives: Sasha Azmi (sister)

International information
- National side: Malaysia
- T20I debut (cap 11): 3 June 2018 v India
- Last T20I: 9 July 2022 v Singapore
Medal record
Representing Malaysia
Women's Cricket
Southeast Asian Games
Bronze medal – third place	2017 Kuala Lumpur	Twenty20
- Source: ESPNCricinfo, 12 January 2022

Zumika Azmi (born 19 June 1998) is a Malaysian cricketer, who plays for the national women's cricket team. She made her Women's Twenty20 International (WT20I) debut for Malaysia on 3 June 2018, in the 2018 Women's Twenty20 Asia Cup. She is of Temiar descent, a group of indigenous peoples known as the Orang Asli in Malaysia. Her younger sister Sasha Azmi also plays cricket for Malaysia.
