= Diviya G K =

Singaporean cricketer (born 1987)

Personal information
- Full name: Diviya G K
- Born: 19 January 1987 (age 39); Singapore
- Nickname: Div / GK
- Height: 1.58 m (5 ft 2 in)
- Batting: Right-handed
- Bowling: Right-arm off break
- Role: All-rounder

International information
- National side: Singapore
- T20I debut (cap 4): 30 August 2018 v Malaysia
- Last T20I: 30 November 2025 v Malaysia

Domestic team information
- Years: Team
- 2013/14: Boland

Career statistics
Competition	WT20I
Matches	45
Runs scored	538
Batting average	17.35
100s/50s	0/1
Top score	77*
Balls bowled	901
Wickets	36
Bowling average	15.44
5 wickets in innings	0
10 wickets in match	0
Best bowling	3/8
Catches/stumpings	7/0
- Source: Cricinfo, 8 October 2024

Diviya G K (née Diviya Ganaisen Krishnan; born 19 January 1987), often referred to (erroneously) as GK Diviya, is a Singaporean businesswoman and cricketer who plays for the women's national cricket team as a right handed all-rounder. She has also captained the team.

== Early life and education ==
Diviya was born in Singapore. At birth, she was named Diviya Ganaisen Krishnan, after her father. However, her parents divorced when she was young, and she was raised by her mother, Vannitha. Soon after the divorce, Vannitha entered into a deed poll, changing her daughter's name to Diviya G K.

Vannitha's elder brother, Stacey Muruthi, is a former captain of the Singapore men's national team. His sons Peter and James Muruthi have also played for that team, as have Anish, Prasheen, and Navin, the three sons of Vannitha's other brother, Sreerangam Paramanantham.

Diviya first played cricket when she was about eight years old. Initially, she would play only with her five male cousins, and her uncle Stacey. They would play at the void deck of her grandparents' house in Ang Mo Kio, using biscuit tins as makeshift stumps, and a tennis ball. Playing against boys was challenging, and Diviya's cousins would tease her by saying that she could not play cricket because she was a girl.

To improve her cricketing skills, Diviya watched cricket matches on television, and practiced batting and bowling on her own. Her favourite cricketers were Kevin Pietersen, Steve Waugh and Muttiah Muralitharan. She could not play cricket at her school, St. Margaret's Secondary, as it was not available, but took up tennis as a co-curricular activity, and played hockey for the Singapore Cricket Club.

When she was 18 years old, Diviya was given her first cricket coaching.

After Diviya left school, she studied Clinical Science at Charles Sturt University in New South Wales, Australia, a course that has greatly helped her in her cricket career. While living in Australia as a student, she played cricket for the men's team of a club, and hockey and soccer for her university. During her vacations in Singapore, she coached cricket, hockey, and soccer for Asia Pacific Sports Management. She also planned to obtain a post-graduate degree in medicine and become a doctor. However, she was unable, due to financial constraints, to pursue post-graduate studies.

== Domestic career ==
As a young player, Diviya took the field in various domestic competitions in Singapore. She played in the boys' U-16 Singapore Cricket Association (SCA) league, in Division Six of the SCA men's league for the national women's team, and in Division Five of that league for the Singapore Cricket Club (SCC).

She also played men's club cricket in Australia, with Waratahs in Darwin in 2008, and with Cavaliers in Orange, New South Wales, in 2011.

In August 2013, she became the first woman to play in Division Two of the SCA men's league. In her debut match at that level, for SCC Cougars against Marina 1, she took 4–24 in eight overs, was named player of the match, and earned praise from the captains of both teams. SCC Cougars won the match by six wickets.

In early 2014, Diviya had a 33-day stint playing for one of the top three South African domestic women's cricket teams, Boland, in the Women's Provincial Programme 50-over tournament. As the team's players were not paid, she was sponsored by well-wishers including Joe Grimberg, former Judicial Commissioner of the Supreme Court of Singapore and patron of the SCA, and Skiya Sports. The Boland team was so strong that she did not get many opportunities to bat or bowl, but she was praised by the team's coach and her teammates for her potential and determination.

The following year, 2015, Divya played for the HV & CV Quick domestic team in the Netherlands. In both years, she also attempted to raise sponsorship to play domestic cricket in both Sri Lanka and Australia, but was unsuccessful. As of 2019, she was still playing domestic men's league cricket for the SCC.

In mid-2019, Diviya played for several teams in the Sunbirds Women's League in Singapore, and in December 2019/January 2020 she took the field for Southern Jaguars in the Malaysian Super Women League.

== International career ==
=== Singapore ===
In 2006, the SCA put together its first women's national team. Diviya tried out for the team, and was selected. She was also appointed as captain of the team for its first ever match, against Malaysia, at the Mutiara Rini Oval in Johor Bahru, Malaysia, on 29 April 2007. Malaysia won the match by 58 runs.

Diviya again led Singapore in the 2007 ACC Women's Championship, a 30-over a side tournament also held in Johor Bahru, in July 2007. After losses to China by 38 runs, and Bangladesh by 10 wickets, the Singapore team finished on a high note by defeating the United Arab Emirates by six wickets, with Diviya's 31 runs being the top score for the match.

Two years later, at the ACC Women's Twenty20 Championship held in Kuala Lumpur, Malaysia, in July 2009, Singapore started slowly but met with more success. In the team's third match, a 25 run victory over Iran, Diviya took 4–10, but was pipped by her teammate Annapurna Mukherjee for the player of the match award. Two days later, Singapore beat Qatar by 23 runs, and Diviya was player of the match with 27 runs and her bowling figures of 3–8. Following a third victory in a row, against Bhutan by 34 runs, Diviya took 2–11 in Singapore's fourth consecutive win, by six wickets against Malaysia in the playoff for 5th place.

Singapore's progress through the next ACC Women's Twenty20 Championship, held in Kuwait in February 2011, was somewhat the opposite. The team won its first two matches, against Bhutan and Oman, respectively, in each case by 10 wickets. In the first match, Diviya took 4-12 and was named as player of the match. However, the team then lost its next two matches, against Malaysia and China, by large margins, and also lost playoff against Malaysia for 5th place by just one wicket.

In January 2013, Diviya, but not Singapore, had a more successful ACC Women's Championship, which that year was played in a 25-overs per side format in Chiang Mai, Thailand. Singapore lost its first two matches, against Kuwait and China, respectively, by big margins. It then won its third match, against Qatar, by 16 runs, with Diviya making 52 and winning the player of the match award. In Singapore's next match, against Thailand, Diviya again top scored for her team, with 29 runs, but Thailand won by 129 runs thanks to a captain's knock by Sornnarin Tippoch, who scored the first ever century in the ACC Women's Championship. Singapore then lost to Iran before winning the playoff for 9th and 10th places against the United Arab Emirates.

Diviya ended the tournament as Singapore's top scorer (136 runs in six innings, with a highest of 52) and wicket-taker (six wickets at an average of 15 with a best of 2-21).

For the annual Saudari Cup series between Singapore and Malaysia at the Kallang Ground in Singapore in August 2015, Singapore was captained by Ankita Ved. Singapore lost the first two matches, but won the third, in which Diviya top scored with 58 in 44 balls, and also took 2 for 13. Ahead of the 2016 Saudari Cup, held at Johor Cricket Academy Oval, Malaysia, Diviya reassumed the captaincy. She then led the team to victory in the first match, but otherwise had a quiet series, which Malaysia won 2–1.

In August 2017, Diviya again captained Singapore in the Women's twenty20 tournament at the 2017 Southeast Asian Games in Selangor, Malaysia. Although she achieved her team's best bowling figures of 1/23 in Singapore's match against Malaysia, and top scored for the team with 37 in 39 balls against Indonesia, the team lost all of its matches and finished last in the tournament.

The following year, on 9 August 2018, Diviya made her Women's Twenty20 International (WT20I) debut for, and also captained, Singapore against Malaysia at the Selangor Turf Club, Kuala Lumpur, in the first match of the 2018 Saudari Cup. The match was also Singapore's first ever WT20I. During the six-match tournament, Diviya made the most runs and took the most wickets for Singapore, and also topped both the batting and bowling averages for the team. In the third match, she took 2/7 in Singapore's maiden WT20I victory, by 29 runs. In the fourth match, she top scored for both the match and the series with 77*, and was named player of the match for leading Singapore to the team's second WT20I victory, this time by 5 wickets. In the fifth match, she took 3/8, her best bowling figures for the series, which Malaysia ultimately won by four matches to two.

Singapore's and Diviya's next WT20I fixtures were during a three-match tour by Myanmar in April 2019. Ahead of that series, Diviya relinquished the captaincy to Shafina Mahesh. Diviya's best performance in the series was 2/15 in the second match; Myanmar won the series 2–0 when the third match was abandoned without a ball being bowled.

Four months later, in August 2019, Singapore hosted Malaysia for that year's Saudari Cup. In the three match series, Diviya starred with 45*, 31* and 35, and once again topped her team's batting aggregates and averages, but Malaysia won the series 3–0.

=== FairBreak ===
In 2018, Diviya played for a FairBreak XI captained by Suzie Bates, in a special T20 exhibition match against a Sir Paul Getty XI at Wormsley Cricket Ground in Buckinghamshire, England. She finished the match with two wickets. In February 2020, she was a member of a FairBreak XI captained by Sana Mir, in a similar exhibition match against a Bradman Women's XI at the Bradman Oval in Bowral, New South Wales. In May 2022, she played four matches for the Spirit team in the 2022 FairBreak Invitational T20 in Dubai, United Arab Emirates.

== Off the field ==
=== Business career ===
Diviya's career in business began in November 2016, when she started a three-month stint as a marketing executive at Deloitte Touche Tohmatsu. She then spent just over a year as the country manager of Muraspec, a designer, manufacturer and distributor of wall coverings and interior surfaces, followed by nearly two years at 21North, a supplier of aftermarket services in the automotive industry.

Meanwhile, in July 2017, she teamed up with Singapore men's cricket team captain Chetan Suryawanshi and Indian cricketers MS Dhoni and Rohit Sharma to establish SportsKingdom International, an operator of cricket academies in Singapore and India, and a booking platform for coaching, facilities, equipment and expert advice. From June 2017 to November 2019, she was the chief operating officer of the company.

In June 2019, Diviya became a regional business consultant for AXS, an international business consulting firm. Since August 2021, she has been an account manager at Gartner, a technological research and consulting business.

=== Personal life ===
Diviya's Singapore friends call her 'Div'. Most of her mates in Australia call her 'GK'.

== See also ==
- List of Singapore women Twenty20 International cricketers
