= Grant Russ =

Filipino cricketer

Personal information
- Full name: Grant Ronald Russ

International information
- National side: Philippines
- T20I debut (cap 8): 22 March 2019 v Papua New Guinea
- Last T20I: 26 December 2023 2023 v Indonesia
Medal record
Men's cricket
Representing the Philippines
Southeast Asian Games
Silver medal – second place	2025 Thailand	Men's T20
Silver medal – second place	2025 Thailand	Men's T10
- Source: Cricinfo, 30 October 2024

Grant Ronald Russ is a Filipino cricketer who plays for the Philippines cricket team. In March 2019, he was named in the Philippines squad for the Regional Finals of the 2018–19 ICC T20 World Cup East Asia-Pacific Qualifier tournament. Like several other of his teammates, Russ made his Twenty20 International (T20I) debut against Papua New Guinea on 22 March 2019.

He was part of the Philippines' team for the 2022 ICC Men's T20 World Cup Global Qualifier A tournament in Oman.
