= List of Cambodia women Twenty20 International cricketers =

This is a list of Cambodia women Twenty20 International cricketers. A Women's Twenty20 International (WT20I) is an international cricket match between two representative teams. A T20I is played under the rules of Twenty20 cricket. In April 2018, the International Cricket Council (ICC) granted full international status to Twenty20 women's matches played between member sides from 1 July 2018 onwards. Cambodia women played their first WT20I on 21 December 2022 against the Philippines during a series against Philippines in Phnom Penh.

The list is arranged in the order in which each player won her first Twenty20 cap. Where more than one player won her first Twenty20 cap in the same match, those players are listed alphabetically by surname.

== Key ==
General

- ‡ – Captain
- † – Wicket-keeper
- First – Year of debut
- Last – Year of latest game
- Mat – Number of matches played

Batting

- Runs – Runs scored in career
- HS – Highest score
- Avg – Runs scored per dismissal
- * – Batsman remained not out
- 50 – Number of half centuries
- 100 – Centuries scored

Bowling

- Balls – Balls bowled in career
- Wkt – Wickets taken in career
- BBI – Best bowling in an innings
- Ave – Average runs per wicket

Fielding

- Ca – Catches taken
- St – Stumpings affected

== Players ==
Statistics are correct as of 16 August 2025.

Cambodia women T20I cricketers
General					Batting					Bowling				Fielding		Ref
No.	Name	First	Last	Mat	Runs	HS	Avg	50	100	Balls	Wkt	BBI	Ave	Ca	St	Ref
1	Dok Da Nit	2022	2025	15	58	13*	4.46	0	0	72	2	1/14	42.00	0	0	
2	Em Rotana	2022	2025	7	18	6*	3.00	0	0	–	–	–	–	0	0	
3	Heang Karoney	2022	2022	5	17	10	4.25	0	0	–	–	–	–	0	0	
4	Hon Sovannary†	2022	2023	11	37	18*	3.70	0	0	–	–	–	–	0	0	
5	Hor Siv na	2022	2025	14	13	7*	1.44	0	0	174	16	4/17	7.75	1	0	
6	Huon Saruon	2022	2022	1	2	2*	–	0	0	–	–	–	–	0	0	
7	Loch Srey	2022	2025	12	22	9*	2.44	0	0	194	4	2/24	44.25	0	0	
8	Ly Saomakara	2022	2025	11	95	29	9.50	0	0	48	2	2/24	23.50	0	0	
9	Pech Pisa‡	2022	2025	15	150	43	10.71	0	0	48	1	1/15	48.00	1	0	
10	Pen Samon‡†	2022	2025	16	117	35	9.00	0	0	148	5	3/19	27.40	1	0	
11	Phoup Srey Pheak	2022	2025	14	17	5	1.70	0	0	268	26	6/9	7.61	1	0	
12	Hak Seakmey	2022	2023	8	2	2	0.66	0	0	116	8	4/7	11.75	1	0	
13	Heal Theara	2022	2025	12	12	6*	2.00	0	0	144	6	3/17	23.33	2	0	
14	Ouen Sophy†	2022	2023	12	20	8*	2.85	0	0	–	–	–	–	1	0	
15	Sok Srey Maov	2022	2025	12	4	3	0.80	0	0	144	9	4/21	17.77	2	0	
16	Sean Chan Boromey	2023	2023	5	1	1	0.25	0	0	18	0	–	–	1	0	
17	Soung Seav	2023	2023	3	1	1	0.50	0	0	28	0	–	–	0	0	
18	Nang Vichara	2025	2025	3	15	12	5.00	0	0	12	0	–	–	0	0	

Note: Details of catchers for the series against Philippines in December 2022 are missing from the Cricinfo scorecards and hence the statistics.
