= Cambodia women's national cricket team =

Cricket team

Cambodia

International Cricket Council
- ICC status: Associate member (2022)
- ICC region: Asia
ICC Rankings	Current	Best-ever
T20I	59th	35th (23-Dec-22)

T20 Internationals
- First T20I: v. Philippines at ISF Sports Ground, Phnom Penh; 21 December 2022
- Last T20I: v. Singapore at Singapore National Cricket Ground, Singapore; 16 August 2025
T20Is	Played	Won/Lost
Total	16	5/11 (0 ties, 0 no results)
This year	0	0/0 (0 ties, 0 no results)
- As of 16 August 2025

The Cambodia national women's cricket team represents Cambodia in cricket. In April 2018, the International Cricket Council (ICC) granted full Women's Twenty20 International (WT20I) status to all its members. Cambodia was admitted as a member of ICC in July 2022. Therefore, all Twenty20 matches played between Cambodia and other ICC members after that date have the full WT20I status.

It made its international debut in December 2022, with a 6-match WT20I series at home against the Philippines, winning 5 of the 6 matches. In January 2023, the Cricket Federation of Cambodia announced on its Facebook page that it would host a 5-match WT20I series against Singapore the following month.

== Record ==
International match summary

Last updated 16 August 2025

Playing record
Format	M	W	L	T	NR	Inaugural match
Twenty20 Internationals	16	5	11	0	0	21 December 2022

=== Twenty20 International ===
T20I record versus nations

Records complete to WT20I #2438. Last updated 16 August 2025.

Opponent	M	W	L	T	NR	First match	First win
ICC Associate members
Indonesia	1	0	1	0	0	8 May 2023	
Philippines	6	5	1	0	0	21 December 2022	21 December 2022
Singapore	9	0	9	0	0	8 February 2023	

== See also ==
- List of Cambodia women Twenty20 International cricketers
