= Amjad Mahboob =

Singaporean cricketer

Personal information
- Born: 27 February 1981 (age 45); Lahore, Pakistan
- Batting: Right-handed
- Bowling: Right-arm medium
- Role: Bowler

International information
- National side: Singapore
- T20I debut (cap 1): 22 July 2019 v Qatar
- Last T20I: 4 May 2023 v Cambodia
- Source: Cricinfo, 4 May 2023

Amjad Mahboob (born 27 February 1981) is a Pakistani-born Singaporean cricketer and the former captain of the Singapore cricket team. As of 2025, he serves as the Coach of the Singapore cricket team.

== Career ==
He played in the 2014 ICC World Cricket League Division Three tournament. He played in Singapore's squad for the 2018 Asia Cup Qualifier tournament. He was the leading wicket-taker for Singapore in the tournament, with nine dismissals in three matches.

In October 2018, he was named in Singapore's squad in the Eastern sub-region group for the 2018–19 ICC World Twenty20 Asia Qualifier tournament. Later the same month, he was named in Singapore's squad for the 2018 ICC World Cricket League Division Three tournament in Oman.

In July 2019, he was named as the captain of Singapore's Twenty20 International (T20I) squad for the Regional Finals of the 2018–19 ICC T20 World Cup Asia Qualifier tournament. He made his T20I debut for Singapore against Qatar on 22 July 2019.

In September 2019, he was named as the captain of Singapore's squad for the 2019 Malaysia Cricket World Cup Challenge League A tournament. He made his List A debut for Singapore, against Qatar, in the Cricket World Cup Challenge League A tournament on 17 September 2019. In October 2019, he was named as the captain of Singapore's squad for the 2019 ICC T20 World Cup Qualifier tournament in the United Arab Emirates. He was the leading wicket-taker for Singapore in the tournament, with ten dismissals in six matches. In 2023, their team won the Sixes.

Amjad Mahboob has retired from all forms of competitive cricket on 15 September 2023, when he was provided an appreciation dinner by the national board. Since then, as of 2025, he serves as the coach of the National Men's Team of Singapore.
