= Philippines national cricket team =

Philippines
- Philippine Cricket Association logo
- Nickname: Carabaos
- Association: Philippine Cricket Association

Personnel
- Captain: Daniel Smith
- Coach: Henry Tyler (2022–)

Team information
- Home venue: Friendship Oval, Dasmariñas, Cavite

History
- Twenty20 debut: v Indonesia at East Asia-Pacific Division Two, Apia, Samoa 4 April 2011

International Cricket Council
- ICC status: Associate member (2017)
- ICC region: Asia / East Asia-Pacific
ICC Rankings	Current	Best-ever
T20I	57th	42nd (2 May 2019)

T20 Internationals
- First T20I: v Indonesia at Amini Park, Port Moresby; 22 March 2019
- Last T20I: v Fiji at Sano International Cricket Ground 2, Sano; 18 May 2026
T20Is	Played	Won/Lost
Total	48	20/26 (1 tie, 1 no result)
This year	6	3/3 (0 ties, 0 no results)
- T20 World Cup Qualifier appearances: 2 (Note: T20 World Cup Qualifier refers to the Regional Final of the ICC East Asia-Pacific region from the 2023 edition.) (first in 2022)
- Best result: 4th (2023)
T20I kit
- As of 26 May 2026

The Philippines national cricket team is the men's team representing the Philippines in international cricket. It is organized by the Philippine Cricket Association (PCA) which became an affiliate member of the International Cricket Council (ICC) in 2003. The PCA has been an associate member since 2017.

The Philippines were ranked at their career high 42nd in T20Is as of 3 May 2019 in the rankings released by the International Cricket Council for Twenty20 International.

== History ==
In 2011, The national team made their Twenty20 debut when they competed at the East Asia-Pacific Division 2 in Samoa, winning over Indonesia, the Cook Islands, Tonga and South Korea before conceding defeat to the host nation in the final. The tournament was the Philippines' first International Cricket Council (ICC)-sanctioned match. The tournament was part of a qualifying pyramid for the 2012 ICC World Twenty20 in Sri Lanka.

The Philippines then played at the 2014 ICC East Asia-Pacific Men's Championship in New South Wales, Australia and finished fifth among eight national teams. Indian expatriate, Awais Mohd became the first Philippine national team member to score a half-century in an ICC-sanctioned match while playing for the country in the EAP tournament.

At the 2017 ICC World Cricket League East Asia-Pacific Region Qualifiers, the Philippines finished fourth out of six nations, failing to qualify for Division Five.

The national team decided not to participate at the 2017 Southeast Asian Games as it sought more Filipino players, sponsors and government support but planned to participate in the 2019 edition.

=== 2018–present ===
They tried to attempt to qualify for the 2020 ICC World Twenty20 tournament in Australia with the Philippines as one of the co-hosts of the East Asia-Pacific Qualifier. They advanced to the Regional Finals in Papua New Guinea after finishing first among four participating teams at the qualifiers hosted at the cricket ground of the Emilio Aguinaldo College in December 2018 in Dasmariñas, Cavite.

In April 2018, the ICC decided to grant full Twenty20 International (T20I) status to all its members. Therefore, all Twenty20 matches played between the Philippines and other ICC members since 1 January 2019 have been full T20Is.

Philippines made its Twenty20 International debut on 22 March 2019, losing to Papua New Guinea by 133 runs in the 2018–19 ICC T20 World Cup East Asia-Pacific Qualifier at Amini Park, Port Moresby, Papua New Guinea The team would become inactive for three years due to the COVID-19 pandemic before featuring in the 2022 ICC Men's T20 World Cup qualifiers.

== Home ground ==
Locations of grounds which have hosted international cricket matches within Luzon in the Philippines

The Philippine national team had the Manila Nomads Sports Club grounds in Parañaque as its home venue. When the Nomads' grounds closed, the national team moved its home to the cricket grounds of the Emilio Aguinaldo College in Dasmariñas, Cavite, the sole cricket venue in the country as of 2017.

== Tournament history ==
=== ICC World Twenty20 ===
- 2020: Did not qualify

=== ICC World Twenty20 Qualifier ===
- 2022 (Qualifier A): 8th
- 2023 (EAP Regional Final): 4th

=== World Cricket League ===
- 2017 EAP Region Qualifiers: 4th place

=== EAP Championship ===
- 2011 Division Two: 2nd
- 2013: Did not enter
- 2014: 5th place

=== Southeast Asian Games ===
- 2017: Did not enter
- 2025: (silver) (T20I, T10)

== Players ==
Philippines squad for 2022–23 ICC Men's T20 World Cup East Asia-Pacific Qualifier held at Papua New Guinea from 22 to 29 July 2023.

- Amit Alam (former c)
- Francis Norman Walsh
- Hern Isorena
- Jordan Alegre
- Kapil Kumar
- Kulwinderjit Singh
- Amanpreet Sirah
- Gurbhupinder Chohan
- Henry Tyler
- Jean Podoski
- Grant Russ
- Arshdeep Singh Samra
- Huzaifa Mohammed
- Josef Doctora
- Kepler Lukies
- Ajeet Kumar
- Liam Myott
- Surinder Singh

== Records and statistics ==
International Match Summary — Philippines

Last updated 18 May 2026

Playing Record
Format	M	W	L	T	NR	Inaugural Match
Twenty20 Internationals	48	20	26	1	1	22 March 2019

=== Twenty20 International ===
- Highest team total: 246/7 v. South Korea, 10 July 2025 at Udayana Cricket Ground, Jimbaran.
- Highest individual score: 101, Arashdeep Samra v. Indonesia, 10 July 2025 at Udayana Cricket Ground, Jimbaran and Miggy Podosky v. South Korea, 10 July 2025 at Udayana Cricket Ground, Jimbaran.
- Best individual bowling figures: 5/10, Kepler Lukies v. Vanuatu, 29 July 2023 at Amini Park, Port Moresby.

Most T20I runs for Philippines

Player	Runs	Average	Career span
Miggy Podosky	602	19.41	2022–2025
Daniel Smith	591	19.06	2019–2025
Arashdeep Samra	564	26.85	2023–2025
Andrew Donovan	357	51.00	2024–2025
Henry Tyler	309	11.44	2019–2025

Most T20I wickets for Philippines

Player	Wickets	Average	Career span
Kepler Lukies	44	14.93	2023–2025
Liam Myott	27	17.66	2023–2025
Amanpreet Sirah	24	21.79	2023–2025
Huzaifa Mohammed	24	22.12	2022–2024
Daniel Smith	24	25.33	2019–2025

T20I record versus other nations

Records complete to T20I #3884. Last updated 18 May 2026.

Opponent	M	W	L	T	NR	First match	First win
vs Associate Members
Bahrain	1	0	1	0	0	22 February 2022	
Cambodia	1	0	1	0	0	10 May 2023	
Canada	1	0	1	0	0	18 February 2022	
Fiji	2	2	0	0	0	14 May 2026	14 May 2026
Germany	1	0	1	0	0	24 February 2022	
Indonesia	14	8	5	1	0	22 December 2023	22 December 2023
Japan	5	0	5	0	0	22 July 2023	
Malaysia	1	0	1	0	0	9 December 2025	
Nepal	1	0	1	0	0	19 February 2022	
Oman	1	0	1	0	0	21 February 2022	
Papua New Guinea	4	0	3	0	1	22 March 2019	
Samoa	1	0	1	0	0	10 May 2026	
Singapore	2	1	1	0	0	3 May 2023	10 December 2025
South Korea	8	6	2	0	0	1 October 2024	1 October 2024
Thailand	1	1	0	0	0	13 December 2025	13 December 2025
Vanuatu	4	2	2	0	0	23 March 2019	24 March 2019

=== Other records ===
For a list of selected international matches played by Philippines, see Cricket Archive.

== See also ==
- List of Philippines Twenty20 International cricketers
- Philippine women's national cricket team
