= Wan Julia =

Malaysian cricketer (born 1989)

Personal information
- Full name: Wan Julia Wan Mohd Rosli
- Born: 16 February 1989 (age 37)
- Batting: Right-handed
- Role: Wicket-keeper

International information
- National side: Malaysia
- T20I debut (cap 12): 4 June 2018 v Sri Lanka
- Last T20I: 14 February 2026 v Thailand
- Source: ESPNCricinfo, 8 October 2024

Wan Julia (born 16 February 1989) is a Malaysian cricketer. She made her Women's Twenty20 International (WT20I) debut for Malaysia against Sri Lanka on 4 June 2018, in the 2018 Women's Twenty20 Asia Cup. In April 2021, she was one of 15 players to be awarded a contract by the Malaysian Cricket Association, the first time female cricketers for the Malaysian team had been granted contracts.

In November 2021, she was named in Malaysia's side for the 2021 ICC Women's T20 World Cup Asia Qualifier tournament in the United Arab Emirates. In October 2022, she played for Malaysia in Women's Twenty20 Asia Cup. In September 2023, she was selected in Malaysia's squad for 2023 Asian Games.
