= Indian Association Ground =

Cricket ground

Coordinates: 1.3179°N 103.8532°E

- Interactive map of Indian Association Ground

Ground information
- Location: Singapore
- Country: Singapore

International information
- First men's T20I: 22 July 2019: Singapore v Qatar
- Last men's T20I: 3 July 2022: Singapore v Papua New Guinea
- First women's T20I: 18 April 2019: Singapore v Myanmar
- Last women's T20I: 26 August 2023: Singapore v Myanmar
- As of 26 August 2023; Source: Cricinfo

The Indian Association Ground is a cricket ground in Singapore. It has hosted matches in the 2009 ICC World Cricket League Division Six and the 2012 ICC World Cricket League Division Five tournaments, and qualification matches for the 2018 Under-19 Cricket World Cup. It hosted matches in the Regional Finals of the 2018–19 ICC T20 World Cup Asia Qualifier tournament in July 2019.

== List of centuries ==
=== Twenty20 Internationals ===
| No. | Score | Player | Team | Balls | Inns. | Opposing team | Date | Result |
|---|---|---|---|---|---|---|---|---|
| 1 | 106* | Paras Khadka | Nepal | 52 | 2 | Singapore | 28 September 2019 | Won |
