= List of Singapore Twenty20 International cricketers =

This is a list of Singaporean Twenty20 International cricketers.

In April 2018, the ICC decided to grant full Twenty20 International (T20I) status to all its members. Therefore, all Twenty20 matches played between Singapore and other ICC members after 1 January 2019 will be eligible to have T20I status.

Singapore played their first match with T20I status on during the Asian Qualifying Finals for the 2019 ICC T20 World Cup Qualifier in July 2019.

This list comprises all members of the Singapore cricket team who have played at least one T20I match. It is initially arranged in the order in which each player won his first Twenty20 cap. Where more than one player won his first Twenty20 cap in the same match, those players are listed alphabetically by surname.

== Key ==
General

- ‡ – Captain
- † – Wicket-keeper
- First – Year of debut
- Last – Year of latest game
- Mat – Number of matches played

Batting

- Runs – Runs scored in career
- HS – Highest score
- 50 – Half-centuries scored
- 100 – Centuries scored
- Avg – Runs scored per dismissal
- * – Batsman remained not out

Bowling

- Balls – Balls bowled in career
- Wkt – Wickets taken in career
- BBI – Best bowling in an innings
- Ave – Average runs per wicket

Fielding

- Ca – Catches taken
- St – Stumpings affected

== List of players ==
Statistics are correct as of 14 October 2026.

Singapore T20I cricketers
General					Batting					Bowling				Fielding		Ref
No.	Name	First	Last	Mat	Runs	HS	Avg	50	100	Balls	Wkt	BBI	Ave	Ca	St	Ref
1	Amjad Mahboob‡	2019	2023	30	76	38	6.90	0	0	610	40	3/20	21.07	6	0	
2	Vinoth Baskaran	2019	2022	33	54	14*	4.90	0	0	623	29	3/39	27.00	6	0	
3	Surendran Chandramohan	2019	2025	56	1,292	105	25.84	5	2	–	–	–	–	39	0	
4	Tim David‡ (Note: Tim David also played Twenty20 International matches for Australia. Only his record for Singapore is given above.)	2019	2020	14	558	92*	46.50	3	0	164	5	1/18	51.00	12	0	
5	Janak Prakash‡	2019	2024	43	588	56	20.27	1	0	896	48	3/15	26.97	26	0	
6	Anantha Krishna	2019	2023	18	37	21*	9.25	0	0	350	22	4/28	21.54	2	0	
7	Manpreet Singh‡†	2019	2026	65	1,539	112*	27.00	7	1	331	15	3/4	26.20	34	9	
8	Anish Paraam	2019	2024	17	485	100*	48.50	3	1	288	13	3/16	28.92	4	0	
9	Rohan Rangarajan	2019	2025	32	444	49	14.32	0	0	6	0	–	–	9	0	
10	Chetan Suryawanshi †	2019	2023	5	64	53	16.00	0	0	12	1	1/13	13.00	6	1	
11	Selladore Vijayakumar	2019	2019	9	2	1	1.00	0	0	168	12	4/25	17.00	1	0	
12	Aryaman Sunil	2019	2022	25	203	36*	11.27	0	0	450	18	3/33	37.00	8	0	
13	Navin Param	2019	2023	20	378	72*	27.00	2	0	69	3	2/24	26.33	6	0	
14	Sidhant Singh	2019	2020	11	178	77	25.42	2	0	138	6	2/27	36.00	3	0	
15	Aahan Gopinath Achar	2019	2025	13	13	5*	6.50	0	0	240	14	4/8	16.14	2	0	
16	Aritra Dutta‡	2019	2025	37	712	122	19.77	2	1	–	–	–	–	6	0	
17	Rezza Gaznavi‡	2019	2026	29	343	49	14.91	0	0	–	–	–	–	4	0	
18	Avi Dixit	2019	2024	1	100	23	9.09	0	0	144	8	3/27	19.50	3	0	
19	Karthikeyan Subramanian	2020	2020	1	–	–	–	–	–	24	3	3/27	9.00	0	0	
20	Akshay Puri	2022	2026	43	43	13*	3.90	0	0	816	30	3/26	33.86	11	0	
21	Aman Desai†	2022	2025	40	577	64	15.59	2	0	–	–	–	–	20	3	
22	Arjun Mutreja	2022	2024	13	166	77	15.09	1	0	–	–	–	–	9	0	
23	Neil Karnik	2022	2026	10	23	11	7.66	0	0	170	10	3/31	28.10	1	0	
24	Adwitya Bhargava	2022	2023	5	12	5	6.00	0	0	78	9	4/19	8.22	1	0	
25	Abdul Rahman Bhadelia	2022	2023	10	147	67	21.00	1	0	–	–	–	–	4	0	
26	Aaryan Modi	2022	2022	7	48	24	9.60	0	0	–	–	–	–	2	0	
27	Ishaan Swaney	2022	2025	13	98	23	8.90	0	0	48	3	2/26	36.33	4	0	
28	Vihaan Hampihallikar	2022	2022	6	15	6	5.00	0	0	72	1	1/30	129.00	1	0	
29	Amartya Kaul	2022	2026	12	115	56	12.77	1	0	41	4	3/20	9.75	3	0	
30	Sidhant Srikanth†	2022	2022	1	10	10	10.00	0	0	–	–	–	–	1	0	
31	Raoul Sharma	2023	2025	15	225	42	45.00	0	0	66	2	1/17	51.50	12	0	
32	Venkatesan Thiyanesh	2023	2026	7	37	15*	18.50	0	0	60	4	2/13	16.25	5	0	
33	Aryaveer Chaudhary	2023	2024	5	42	37	10.50	0	0	78	3	2/9	33.66	0	0	
34	Ramesh Kalimuthu	2023	2025	15	27	16*	13.50	0	0	313	25	5/21	17.24	1	0	
35	Thilip Thilappan	2023	2023	3	2	1	0.66	0	0	54	1	1/45	85.00	2	0	
36	Harsha Bharadwaj	2023	2026	15	35	26*	11.66	0	0	327	20	6/3	15.95	3	0	
37	Aaryan Menon	2023	2023	1	2	2	2.00	0	0	6	0	–	–	0	0	
38	Sachin Banamali	2024	2024	5	9	8*	9.00	0	0	95	1	1/28	149.00	0	0	
39	Rahul Sheshadri	2024	2024	4	21	15*	10.50	0	0	18	1	1/2	20.00	1	0	
40	William Simpson	2024	2024	6	117	46*	39.00	0	0	–	–	–	–	2	0	
41	Suryansh Gulecha	2025	2026	12	132	32	11.00	0	0	66	0	–	–	7	0	
42	Pranav Sudarshan	2025	2026	18	21	11	3.50	0	0	390	21	3/29	24.14	9	0	
43	Girin Gune	2025	2026	23	408	106*	21.47	1	1	–	–	–	–	6	0	
44	Harsh Venkataram	2025	2026	22	201	27*	33.50	0	0	397	27	5/21	17.96	4	0	
45	Aslan Jafri	2025	2026	13	130	27	10.83	0	0	144	9	3/17	23.33	4	0	
46	Pranav Dhanuka	2025	2025	1	–	–	–	–	–	–	–	–	–	0	0	
47	Jonty Iggo	2025	2025	6	64	31	10.66	0	0	48	2	1/8	34.00	1	0	
48	Vedant Nagpaul	2025	2025	6	4	2*	4.00	0	0	102	5	2/13	20.80	0	0	
49	Shubham Pradhan	2025	2025	2	2	2*	–	0	0	36	1	1/39	56.00	0	0	
50	Mason Sherry	2025	2026	11	79	24*	13.16	0	0	–	–	–	–	4	0	
51	Chandramauli Sridev	2025	2026	7	55	29	13.75	0	0	96	6	2/16	23.50	1	0	
52	Daksh Tyagi	2025	2026	16	98	26	9.80	0	0	270	19	3/38	19.68	5	0	
53	Sai Venugopal	2025	2025	13	249	46*	22.63	0	0	–	–	–	–	12	0	
54	Kashif Khan	2025	2025	5	34	13	8.50	0	0	73	4	2/11	18.75	0	0	
55	Hari Kukreja	2025	2025	6	113	51	18.83	0	0	24	1	1/22	51.00	0	0	
56	Kabir Berlia	2025	2025	6	47	28*	15.66	0	0	115	8	3/41	20.12	0	0	
57	Kannusami Sathish	2025	2025	8	128	26	16.00	0	0	60	4	2/19	18.50	3	0	
58	Chirag Shivakumar	2025	2025	4	27	17	9.00	0	0	42	0	–	–	1	0	
59	Arnav Manoj	2025	2025	3	0	0	0.00	0	0	–	–	–	–	0	0	
60	Mahiyu Bhatia	2025	2026	9	126	57	14.00	1	0	30	2	2/4	13.50	4	0	
61	Jeevan Santhanam	2026	2026	12	34	18*	6.80	0	0	240	15	3/31	16.66	1	0	
62	Pratham Somani	2026	2026	2	–	–	–	–	–	–	–	–	–	0	0	
63	Aaron Varghese	2026	2026	3	26	12	8.66	0	0	–	–	–	–	0	0	
64	Kapish Venkatraman	2026	2026	6	2	2	2.00	0	0	102	10	3/20	14.00	1	0	
65	Neel Mittal	2026	2026	1	1	1	1.00	0	0	–	–	–	–	0	0	
66	Aarkin Kessar	2026	2026	4	–	–	–	–	–	60	6	2/1	9.66	3	0	
67	Riaan Naik	2026	2026	8	97	46	13.85	0	0	–	–	–	–	0	0	
68	Raheel Thakkar†	2026	2026	4	21	13*	21.00	0	0	–	–	–	–	3	1	
69	Kabir Zandani†	2026	2026	4	27	15	9.00	0	0	–	–	–	–	1	0	
70	Harman Singh†	2026	2026	2	2	2	1.00	0	0	24	0	–	–	2	0	
71	Aahan Vuthandam†	2026	2026	1	14	14	14.00	0	0	–	–	–	–	0	0	
