= 2024 ACC Men's Challenger Cup =

International associate Twenty20 cricket tournament

- Tournament logo
- Dates: 27 January – 11 February 2024
- Administrator: Asian Cricket Council
- Cricket format: Twenty20 International
- Tournament format(s): Group stage and knockout stage
- Host: Thailand
- Champions: Saudi Arabia (2nd title)
- Runners-up: Cambodia
- Participants: 10
- Matches: 22
- Most runs: (Cambodia) Luqman Butt (245)
- Most wickets: (Cambodia) Sharwan Godara (Cambodia) Utkarsh Jain (12 each)

The 2024 ACC Men's Challenger Cup was the second edition of the ACC Men's Challenger Cup, hosted by the Cricket Association of Thailand from 27 January to 11 February 2024. Ten associate teams competed in 22 matches at the Terdthai Cricket Ground in Bangkok, Thailand. The defending champions (in 50-over format), Saudi Arabia defeated Cambodia in the final, to win their first title in the 20-over format. Both teams advanced to the 2024 ACC Men's Premier Cup.

== Background ==
The ACC Men's Challenger Cup is an international cricket competition in limited overs cricket format (an alternating format of 50-overs and 20-overs cricket), organised by the Asian Cricket Council (ACC) since its inauguration in 2023. The competition is played by the associate members of the ACC, with the top teams advancing to the ACC Men's Premier Cup to determine qualification for the Asia Cup and the ACC Emerging Teams Asia Cup. Saudi Arabia were the defending champions having won the 2023 edition in 50-over format.

=== Format ===
The top 7 of the 10 qualified teams based on the ICC T20I rankings directly proceeded to the group stage, while the bottom 3 teams played in a play-in qualifier stage in round-robin format for 3 matches, with the top team advancing to the group stage. In the group stage, 8 teams were divided into two groups of four, with each team playing each other team in the group once in a round-robin format for 12 matches, and the top two teams in each group advanced to the knockout stage. The knockout stage consisted of two semi-finals, a third-place play-off and a final. Three consolation play-offs were also played by the bottom 6 teams. In the 2024 tournament, all the matches were played in 20-over format with international status as Twenty20 International (T20I).

=== Teams ===
The top 8 associate teams based on the ICC T20I rankings directly qualified for the Premier Cup, while the next ranked 8 teams: Bhutan, Cambodia, China, Indonesia, Japan, Maldives, Myanmar, Saudi Arabia, Singapore and Thailand played in the Challenger Cup.

=== Venue ===
Tournament venues in Thailand

All 22 matches of the tournament were played at the Terdthai Cricket Ground in Bangkok, Thailand.

== Squads ==
Following squads were announced for the tournament:

- Bhutan: Manoj Adhikari (wk), Namgang Chejay (wk), Jigme Dorji, Karma Dorji, Ranjung Dorji, Thinley Jamtsho (c), Sherab Loday, Tashi Phuntsho, Suprit Pradhan, Tenjin Rabgey, Namgay Thinley, Ngawang Thinley, Tenzin Wangchuk, Sonam Yeshey,
- Cambodia: Etienne Beukes, Phon Bunthean, Luqman Butt (c), Sharwan Godara, Lakshit Gupta, Uday Hathinjar (wk), Utkarsh Jain, Gulam Murtaza, Anish Prasad, Chanthoeun Rathanak, Te Senglong, Ram Sharan, Manish Sharma, Salvin Stanly, Pel Vannak (wk)
- China: Wu Jiaqi, Deng Jinqi, Huang Junjie (wk), Zou Kui, Wei Guo Lei (c, wk), Ma Qiancheng, Xie Qiulai (wk), Tian Sen Qun, Luo Shilin, Zhao Tianle, Qiu Yingjie, Zong Yuechao, Zhuang Zelin, Chen Zhuo Yue
- Indonesia: Ketut Artawan, Gede Arta, Ferdinando Banunaek, Kadek Gamantika (c), Danilson Hawoe, Dharma Kesuma (wk), Maxi Koda, Gede Priandana, Kirubasankar Ramamoorthy, Ahmad Ramdoni (wk), Dhanesh Shetty, Padmakar Surve, Anjar Tadarus
- Japan: Koji Abe, Ryan Drake, Charles Hinze, Kendel Kadowaki-Fleming (c), Kazuma Kato-Stafford, Piyush Kumbhare, Wataru Miyauchi (wk), Sabaorish Ravichandran, Reo Sakurano-Thomas, Alexander Shirai-Patmore (wk), Declan Suzuki-McComb, Ibrahim Takahashi, Makoto Taniyama, Lachlan Yamamoto-Lake
- Maldives: Umar Adam, Ismail Ali, Mohamed Azzam (wk), Azyan Farhath, Ibrahim Hassan, Shaof Hassan (wk), Mohamed Ishmath, Nazwan Ismail, Adam Khalaf, Hassan Rasheed (c), Rasheed Rassam, Ibrahim Rizan, Kaushal Rodrigo, Mohamed Sanoor
- Myanmar: Htet Lin Aung (c), Myat Thu Aung, Thuya Aung, Khin Aye (wk), Paing Danu, Nay Lin Htun, Aung Ko Ko, Swann Htet Ko Ko (wk), Kaung Htet Kyaw, Htet Lin Oo, Nyein Cham Soe, Ko Ko Lin Thu, Ye Naing Tun (wk), Pyae Phyo Wai, Sai Htet Wai
- Saudi Arabia: Ishtiaq Ahmad, Manan Ali (wk), Atif-Ur-Rehman, Haseeb Ghafoor (wk), Usman Khalid, Faisal Khan, Zuhair Muhammad, Usman Najeeb, Shahzaib, Hisham Sheikh (c), Waji Ul Hassan, Waqar Ul Hassan, Abdul Waheed, Imran Yousaf
- Singapore: Sachin Banamali, Harsha Bharadwaj, Surendran Chandramohan, Aman Desai (wk), Avi Dixit, Aritra Dutta (c), Rezza Gaznavi, Ramesh Kalimuthu, Amartya Kaul, Anish Paraam, Akshay Puri, Rohan Rangarajan, Raoul Sharma, Ishaan Swaney
- Thailand: Chaloemwong Chatphaisan, Jandre Coetzee, Phanuwat Desungnoen, Daniel Jacobs, Austin Lazarus (c), Sarawut Maliwan, Khanitson Namchaikul, Narawit Nuntarach, Chanchai Pengkumta, Robert Raina, Yodsak Saranonnakkun, Nopphon Senamontree, Phiriyapong Suanchuai (wk), Mukesh Thakur, Akshaykumar Yadav (wk)

== Qualifier stage ==
The play-in qualifier stage featured 3 matches played from 27 to 29 January 2024. The top team, Cambodia advanced to the group stage, while the bottom two teams, Myanmar and China played in a 9th place play-off match on 30 January.

Qualifier stage standings
Pos	Team	Pld	W	L	NR	Pts	NRR	Qualification
1	Cambodia	2	2	0	0	4	4.269	Advanced to the group stage
2	Myanmar	2	1	1	0	2	−1.353	Advanced to the 9th place play-off
3	China	2	0	2	0	0	−2.415	Advanced to the 9th place play-off

Source: Asian Cricket Council, ESPNcricinfo

=== Qualifier fixtures ===
Match 1
27 January 2024
09:30 UTC+7
Scorecard

Myanmar; 72/8 (20 overs)	v	Cambodia; 74/3 (9.1 overs)
Pyae Phyo Wai 16 (15); Utkarsh Jain 3/21 (4 overs)		Luqman Butt 43* (29); Ko Ko Lin Thu 1/9 (3 overs)

Cambodia won by 7 wickets
Terdthai Cricket Ground, Bangkok
Umpires: Hardeep Jadeja (Sin) and Osama Saad Alnadwi (Sau)
Player of the match: Luqman Butt (Cam)

- Cambodia won the toss and elected to field.

Match 2
28 January 2024
09:30 UTC+7
Scorecard

Cambodia; 130/5 (20 overs)	v	China; 37 (15.2 overs)
Etienne Beukes 33* (25); Zong Yuechao 2/19 (4 overs)		Wei Guo Lei 14 (25); Sharwan Godara 4/5 (4 overs)

Cambodia won by 93 runs
Terdthai Cricket Ground, Bangkok
Umpires: Melattur Krishnakumar (Mdv) and Osama Saad Alnadwi (Sau)
Player of the match: Sharwan Godara (Cam)

- Cambodia won the toss and elected to bat.
- Huang Junjie (Chn) made his T20I debut.

Match 3
29 January 2024
09:30 UTC+7
Scorecard

China; 74 (19.3 overs)	v	Myanmar; 75/9 (19.3 overs)
Zong Yuechao 19* (25); Htet Lin Aung 3/16 (4 overs)		Paing Danu 14 (18); Chen Zhuo Yue 3/7 (4 overs)

Myanmar won by 1 wicket
Terdthai Cricket Ground, Bangkok
Umpires: Arif Ansari (Tha) and Geda Suda Arsa (Idn)
Player of the match: Htet Lin Aung (Mya)

- Myanmar won the toss and elected to field.
- Xie Qiulai (Chn) made his T20I debut.

=== 9th place play-off ===
9th place play-off
30 January 2024
09:30 UTC+7
Scorecard

China; 129/4 (20 overs)	v	Myanmar; 82/9 (20 overs)
Wei Guo Lei 70 (61); Myat Thu Aung 1/13 (3 overs)		Paing Danu 19 (32); Ma Qiancheng 5/9 (4 overs)

China won by 47 runs
Terdthai Cricket Ground, Bangkok
Umpires: Samad Akbar (Tha) and Dorji Loday (Bhu)
Player of the match: Wei Guo Lei (Chn)

- Myanmar won the toss and elected to field.
- Ma Qiancheng became the first Chinese cricketer to take a five-wicket haul in men's T20Is.

== Group stage ==
In the group stage, two groups of four teams played in a round-robin format for a total of 12 matches from 1 to 6 February 2024. The top two teams from each group: Saudi Arabia and Cambodia from group A and Singapore and Japan from group B advanced to the knockout stage, while the bottom four teams: Indonesia and Bhutan from group A and Thailand and Maldives from group B played in 5th and 7th place play-off matches on 7 February.

Group A	Group B
Bhutan; Cambodia; Indonesia; Saudi Arabia	Japan; Maldives; Singapore; Thailand

=== Group A ===
Group A standings
Pos	Team	Pld	W	L	NR	Pts	NRR	Qualification
1	Saudi Arabia	3	3	0	0	6	4.282	Advanced to the knockout stage
2	Cambodia	3	2	1	0	4	−1.140	Advanced to the knockout stage
3	Indonesia	3	1	2	0	2	−1.264	Advanced to the place play-offs
4	Bhutan	3	0	3	0	0	−1.674	Advanced to the place play-offs

Source: Asian Cricket Council, ESPNcricinfo

Match 5
1 February 2024
09:30 UTC+7
Scorecard

Saudi Arabia; 192/6 (20 overs)	v	Cambodia; 104 (19.3 overs)
Abdul Waheed 99 (58); Salvin Stanly 2/8 (1 over)		Lakshit Gupta 24 (20); Imran Yousaf 3/16 (3.3 overs)

Saudi Arabia won by 88 runs
Terdthai Cricket Ground, Bangkok
Umpires: Viswanadan Kalidas (Mas) and Narayanan Sivan (Mas)
Player of the match: Abdul Waheed (Sau)

- Cambodia won the toss and elected to field.
- Waji Ul Hassan (Sau) made his T20I debut.

Match 6
1 February 2024
13:50 UTC+7
Scorecard

Indonesia; 132/7 (20 overs)	v	Bhutan; 116 (19.4 overs)
Anjar Tadarus 36 (29); Tenzin Wangchuk 3/22 (4 overs)		Suprit Pradhan 28 (20); Maxi Koda 2/12 (4 overs)

Indonesia won by 16 runs
Terdthai Cricket Ground, Bangkok
Umpires: Arif Ansari (Tha) and Melattur Krishnakumar (Mdv)
Player of the match: Anjar Tadarus (Idn)

- Bhutan won the toss and elected to field.

Match 9
3 February 2024
09:30 UTC+7
Scorecard

Bhutan; 89 (18.5 overs)	v	Saudi Arabia; 93/2 (11 overs)
Ranjung Mikyo Dorji 22 (22); Usman Khalid 4/6 (2 overs)		Haseeb Ghafoor 47* (40); Thinley Jamtsho 1/14 (2 overs)

Saudi Arabia won by 8 wickets
Terdthai Cricket Ground, Bangkok
Umpires: Melattur Krishnakumar (Mdv) and Narayanan Sivan (Mas)
Player of the match: Usman Khalid (Sau)

- Saudi Arabia won the toss and elected to field.
- Zuhair Muhammad (Sau) made his T20I debut.

Match 10
3 February 2024
13:50 UTC+7
Scorecard

Indonesia; 127/6 (20 overs)	v	Cambodia; 132/4 (19.2 overs)
Kirubasankar Ramamoorthy 54 (41); Gulam Murtaza 3/33 (4 overs)		Luqman Butt 52 (48); Ferdinando Banunaek 2/20 (4 overs)

Cambodia won by 6 wickets
Terdthai Cricket Ground, Bangkok
Umpires: Samad Akbar (Tha) and Viswanadan Kalidas (Mas)
Player of the match: Luqman Butt (Cam)

- Indonesia won the toss and elected to bat.

Match 13
5 February 2024
09:30 UTC+7
Scorecard

Saudi Arabia; 185/4 (20 overs)	v	Indonesia; 103/9 (20 overs)
Faisal Khan 77 (60); Gede Arta 3/35 (4 overs)		Kirubasankar Ramamoorthy 27 (19); Hisham Sheikh 3/16 (4 overs)

Saudi Arabia won by 82 runs
Terdthai Cricket Ground, Bangkok
Umpires: Arif Ansari (Tha) and Dorji Loday (Bhu)
Player of the match: Faisal Khan (Sau)

- Saudi Arabia won the toss and elected to bat.
- Shahzaib (Sau) made his T20I debut.

Match 14
5 February 2024
13:50 UTC+7
Scorecard

Cambodia; 174/6 (20 overs)	v	Bhutan; 164/6 (20 overs)
Uday Hathinjar 68 (45); Tenzin Wangchuk 3/38 (4 overs)		Thinley Jamtsho 66* (34); Sharwan Godara 2/15 (4 overs)

Cambodia won by 10 runs
Terdthai Cricket Ground, Bangkok
Umpires: Samad Akbar (Tha) and Hardeep Jadeja (Sin)
Player of the match: Uday Hathinjar (Cam)

- Cambodia won the toss and elected to bat.

=== Group B ===
Group B standings
Pos	Team	Pld	W	L	NR	Pts	NRR	Qualification
1	Singapore	3	2	1	0	4	1.015	Advanced to the knockout stage
2	Japan	3	2	1	0	4	0.900	Advanced to the knockout stage
3	Thailand (H)	3	2	1	0	4	0.810	Advanced to the place play-offs
4	Maldives	3	0	3	0	0	−3.054	Advanced to the place play-offs

Source: Asian Cricket Council, ESPNcricinfo
(H) Hosts

Match 7
2 February 2024
09:30 UTC+7
Scorecard

Singapore; 199/4 (20 overs)	v	Maldives; 158/8 (20 overs)
Surendran Chandramohan 82 (55); Ibrahim Hassan 2/42 (4 overs)		Ismail Ali 33 (17); Ramesh Kalimuthu 3/19 (4 overs)

Singapore won by 41 runs
Terdthai Cricket Ground, Bangkok
Umpires: Samad Akbar (Tha) and Geda Suda Arsa (Idn)
Player of the match: Surendran Chandramohan (Sin)

- Singapore won the toss and elected to bat.
- Mohamed Ishmath (Mdv) and Sachin Banamali (Sin) both made their T20I debuts.

Match 8
2 February 2024
13:50 UTC+7
Scorecard

Japan; 166/6 (20 overs)	v	Thailand; 120 (16.5 overs)
Kendel Kadowaki-Fleming 74 (48); Chanchai Pengkumta 2/28 (4 overs)		Chaloemwong Chatphaisan 31 (12); Reo Sakurano-Thomas 6/26 (3.5 overs)

Japan won by 46 runs
Terdthai Cricket Ground, Bangkok
Umpires: Hardeep Jadeja (Sin) and Osama Saad Alnadwi (Sau)
Player of the match: Reo Sakurano-Thomas (Jpn)

- Thailand won the toss and elected to field.
- Austin Lazarus, Mukesh Thakur (Tha) and Koji Abe (Jpn) all made their T20I debuts.

Match 11
4 February 2024
09:30 UTC+7
Scorecard

Singapore; 115/9 (20 overs)	v	Thailand; 116/3 (18.1 overs)
Avi Dixit 23 (23); Mukesh Thakur 4/23 (4 overs)		Chaloemwong Chatphaisan 70* (53); Avi Dixit 2/14 (4 overs)

Thailand won by 7 wickets
Terdthai Cricket Ground, Bangkok
Umpires: Geda Suda Arsa (Idn) and Viswanadan Kalidas (Mas)
Player of the match: Chaloemwong Chatphaisan (Tha)

- Singapore won the toss and elected to bat.

Match 12
4 February 2024
13:50 UTC+7
Scorecard

Japan; 150/8 (20 overs)	v	Maldives; 108 (18.4 overs)
Declan Suzuki-McComb 26 (22); Ibrahim Hassan 2/27 (4 overs)		Umar Adam 40 (26); Makoto Taniyama 3/12 (2.4 overs)

Japan won by 42 runs
Terdthai Cricket Ground, Bangkok
Umpires: Arif Ansari (Tha) and Narayanan Sivan (Mas)
Player of the match: Sabaorish Ravichandran (Jpn)

- Japan won the toss and elected to bat.
- Charles Hinze and Kazuma Kato-Stafford (Jpn) both made their T20I debuts.

Match 15
6 February 2024
09:30 UTC+7
Scorecard

Singapore; 176/5 (20 overs)	v	Japan; 142/8 (20 overs)
Anish Paraam 92* (58); Piyush Kumbhare 2/13 (4 overs)		Lachlan Yamamoto-Lake 35 (27); Avi Dixit 3/27 (4 overs)

Singapore won 34 runs
Terdthai Cricket Ground, Bangkok
Umpires: Viswanadan Kalidas (Mas) and Narayanan Sivan (Mas)
Player of the match: Anish Paraam (Sin)

- Japan won the toss and elected to field.

Match 16
6 February 2024
13:50 UTC+7
Scorecard

Maldives; 127/7 (20 overs)	v	Thailand; 128/2 (9.4 overs)
Azyan Farhath 66* (56); Nopphon Senamontree 2/16 (4 overs)		Akshaykumar Yadav 66* (28); Umar Adam 2/40 (3.4 overs)

Thailand won by 8 wickets
Terdthai Cricket Ground, Bangkok
Umpires: Hardeep Jadeja (Sin) and Osama Saad Alnadwi (Sau)
Player of the match: Jandre Coetzee (Tha)

- Maldives won the toss and elected to bat.

=== Place play-offs ===
5th place play-off
7 February 2024
09:30 UTC+7
Scorecard

Indonesia; 131/8 (20 overs)	v	Thailand; 132/3 (17.2 overs)
Padmakar Surve 46 (44); Jandre Coetzee 3/9 (4 overs)		Akshaykumar Yadav 49 (36); Gede Arta 1/19 (4 overs)

Thailand won by 7 wickets
Terdthai Cricket Ground, Bangkok
Umpires: Dorji Loday (Bhu) and Osama Saad Alnadwi (Sau)
Player of the match: Jandre Coetzee (Tha)

- Thailand won the toss and elected to field.

7th place play-off
7 February 2024
13:50 UTC+7
Scorecard

Maldives; 137/8 (20 overs)	v	Bhutan; 105 (18.2 overs)
Azyan Farhath 43 (45); Tenzin Wangchuk 2/24 (4 overs)		Jigme Dorji 30 (31); Ibrahim Hassan 4/12 (3.2 overs)

Maldives won by 32 runs
Terdthai Cricket Ground, Bangkok
Umpires: Samad Akbar (Tha) and Geda Suda Arsa (Idn)
Player of the match: Azyan Farhath (Mdv)

- Maldives won the toss and elected to bat.

== Knockout stage ==
The knockout stage consisted of two semi-finals played on 9 February and a 3rd place play-off and a final played on 11 February. The top two teams (winners of the semi-finals / finalists): Saudi Arabia and Cambodia qualified for the 2024 ACC Men's Premier Cup.

=== Bracket ===
Semi-finals
A1	Saudi Arabia	98/0 (9 overs)
B2	Japan	97/8 (20 overs)
B1	Singapore	109 (20)
A2	Cambodia	113/4 (14.5)

Final
SF1W	Saudi Arabia	151/5 (17.3 overs)
SF2W	Cambodia	147/5 (20 overs)
3rd place play-off
SF1L	Japan	215/3 (20 overs)
SF2L	Singapore	216/2 (19.2 overs)

=== Semi-finals ===
Semi-final 1
9 February 2024
09:30 UTC+7
Scorecard

Japan; 97/8 (20 overs)	v	Saudi Arabia; 98/0 (9 overs)
Declan Suzuki-McComb 26 (21); Usman Najeeb 3/13 (4 overs)		Faisal Khan 72* (33)

Saudi Arabia won by 10 wickets
Terdthai Cricket Ground, Bangkok
Umpires: Hardeep Jadeja (Sin) and Narayanan Sivan (Mas)
Player of the match: Usman Najeeb (Sau)

- Saudi Arabia won the toss and elected to field.

Semi-final 2
9 February 2024
13:50 UTC+7
Scorecard

Singapore; 109 (20 overs)	v	Cambodia; 113/4 (14.5 overs)
Raoul Sharma 39 (34); Ram Sharan 3/14 (4 overs)		Ram Sharan 61* (46); Ramesh Kalimuthu 2/17 (3 overs)

Cambodia won by 6 wickets
Terdthai Cricket Ground, Bangkok
Umpires: Samad Akbar (Tha) and Viswanadan Kalidas (Mas)
Player of the match: Ram Sharan (Cam)

- Singapore won the toss and elected to bat.

=== 3rd place play-off ===
3rd place play-off
11 February 2024
09:30 UTC+7
Scorecard

Japan; 215/3 (20 overs)	v	Singapore; 216/2 (19.2 overs)
Kendel Kadowaki-Fleming 78 (42); Harsha Bharadwaj 1/30 (3 overs)		Aritra Dutta 122 (63); Sabaorish Ravichandran 1/22 (4 overs)

Singapore won by 8 wickets
Terdthai Cricket Ground, Bangkok
Umpires: Osama Saad Alnadwi (Sau) and Geda Suda Arsa (Idn)
Player of the match: Aritra Dutta (Sin)

- Singapore won the toss and elected to field.
- Aritra Dutta (Sin) scored his maiden century in T20Is.

=== Final ===
Final
11 February 2024
13:50 UTC+7
Scorecard

Cambodia; 147/5 (20 overs)	v	Saudi Arabia; 151/5 (17.3 overs)
Luqman Butt 80* (53); Hisham Sheikh 2/25 (4 overs)		Hisham Sheikh 47* (41); Utkarsh Jain 2/34 (4 overs)

Saudi Arabia won by 5 wickets
Terdthai Cricket Ground, Bangkok
Umpires: Samad Akbar (Tha) and Viswanadan Kalidas (Mas)
Player of the match: Hisham Sheikh (Sau)

- Saudi Arabia won the toss and elected to field.

== See also ==
- International cricket in 2023–24
- Associate international cricket in 2023–24
- 2024 ACC Women's Premier Cup
- International cricket in 2024
- Associate international cricket in 2024
