= 2024 ACC Men's Premier Cup =

International associate Twenty20 cricket tournament

- Dates: 12 – 21 April 2024
- Administrator: Asian Cricket Council
- Cricket format: Twenty20 International
- Tournament format(s): Group stage and knockout stage
- Host: Oman
- Champions: United Arab Emirates (1st title)
- Runners-up: Oman
- Participants: 10
- Matches: 24
- Most runs: (United Arab Emirates) Alishan Sharafu (278)
- Most wickets: (Oman) Aqib Ilyas (12)

The 2024 ACC Men's Premier Cup was the second edition of the ACC Men's Premier Cup, hosted by Oman Cricket from 12 to 21 April 2024. Ten associate teams competed in 24 matches across two venues in Oman, of whom eight teams directly qualified for the tournament through ICC T20I rankings and two advanced from the 2024 Challenger Cup. The defending champions (in 50-over format), Nepal were defeated in the semi-finals by the United Arab Emirates, who went onto defeat hosts Oman in the final, to win their maiden title. The United Arab Emirates, Oman, and Hong Kong (who defeated Nepal in 3rd place play-off) qualified for the 2025 Asia Cup, the 2024 ACC Emerging Teams Asia Cup, and the 2025 Asia Cup Rising Stars.

== Background ==
The ACC Men's Premier Cup is a biennial international cricket competition in the limited overs cricket format (an alternating format of 50-overs and 20-overs cricket), organised by the Asian Cricket Council (ACC) since its inauguration in 2023. The competition is played by the top associate members of the ACC advancing from the ACC Men's Challenger Cup to determine qualification for the Asia Cup and the ACC Emerging Teams Asia Cup. Nepal were the defending champions having won the 2023 edition in 50-over format.

The top 8 associate teams based on the ICC T20I rankings: Bahrain, Hong Kong, Kuwait, Malaysia, Nepal, Oman, Qatar and the United Arab Emirates directly qualified for the Premier Cup, while the next ranked 10 teams played in the Challenger Cup. Top 2 teams in the 2024 Challenger Cup: Saudi Arabia and Cambodia advanced to the Premier Cup.

Tournament venues in Oman

The 10 participating teams were divided into two groups of five teams each. In the group stage, each team played each of the other teams in the group once in a round-robin format for 20 matches, and the top two teams in each group advanced to the knockout stage. The knockout stage consisted of two semi-finals, a third-place play-off and a final. In the 2024 tournament, all the matches were played in 20-over format with international status as Twenty20 International (T20I). The tournament was played across 2 venues in Oman: 14 matches at Turf 1 (including both semi-finals, 3rd place play-off and final) and 10 matches at Turf 2 of Oman Cricket Academy Ground in Al Amarat.

== Squads ==
Following squads were announced for the tournament:

- Bahrain: Sohail Ahmed, Imran Ali (wk), Sarfaraz Ali, Imran Anwar, Junaid Aziz, Ahmer Bin Nasir (wk), Haider Butt (c), Rizwan Butt, Ali Dawood, Abdul Majid, Abdul Majid Malik, Ubaid Martuza, Umer Toor (wk), Sathaiya Veerapathiran
- Cambodia: Etienne Beukes, Phon Bunthean, Luqman Butt (c), Sharwan Godara, Lakshit Gupta, Uday Hathinjar (wk), Utkarsh Jain, Asanka Gunarathne, Gulam Murtaza, Anish Prasad, Chanthoeun Rathanak, Te Senglong, Ram Sharan, Salvin Stanly, Pel Vannak (wk), Vimukthi Viraj
- Hong Kong: Zeeshan Ali (wk), Martin Coetzee, Adit Gorawara (wk), Babar Hayat, Ateeq Iqbal, Raunaq Kapur, Aizaz Khan, Ehsan Khan, Nizakat Khan (c), Yasim Murtaza, Nasrulla Rana, Dhananjay Rao, Anshuman Rath, Ayush Shukla
- Kuwait: Ilyas Ahmed, Clinto Anto, Mohammad Aslam (c), Meet Bhavsar (wk), Adnan Idrees, Parvinder Kumar, Nimish Lathief, Sayed Monib, Usman Patel (wk), Yasin Patel, Shahrukh Quddus, Ravija Sandaruwan, Bilal Tahir, Muhammad Umar
- Malaysia: Muhammad Amir, Aqeel Wahid, Syed Aziz, Ahmad Faiz, Ainool Hafizs (wk), Rizwan Haider, Khizar Hayat, Sharvin Muniandy, Nazmus Sakib, Pavandeep Singh, Virandeep Singh (c), Vijay Unni, Muhammad Wafiq, Zubaidi Zulkifle
- Nepal: Dipendra Singh Airee, Kushal Bhurtel, Abinash Bohara, Pratis GC, Gulsan Jha, Sundeep Jora, Sompal Kami, Karan KC, Kushal Malla, Rohit Paudel (c), Lalit Rajbanshi, Anil Sah, Aasif Sheikh (wk), Bibek Yadav
- Oman: Shakeel Ahmed, Pratik Athavale (wk), Fayyaz Butt, Aqib Ilyas, Khalid Kail, Kaleemullah, Ayaan Khan, Bilal Khan, Mehran Khan, Naseem Khushi (wk), Zeeshan Maqsood (c), Mohammad Nadeem, Kashyap Prajapati, Rafiullah
- Qatar: Mohammed Ahnaff, Saqlain Arshad, Amir Farooq, Mohammed Irshad, Muhammad Jabir, Shahzaib Jamil (wk), Ikramullah Khan, Kamran Khan, Gayan Munaweera, Himanshu Rathod, Musawar Shah, Muhammad Tanveer (c), Rifayi Theruvath
- Saudi Arabia: Kashif Abbas, Ishtiaq Ahmad, Manan Ali (wk), Usman Ali, Faisal Khan, Saad Khan, Usman Khalid, Usman Najeeb, Ahmad Raza, Hisham Sheikh (c), Zain Ul Abidin, Waji Ul Hassan, Atif-Ur-Rehman, Abdul Waheed
- United Arab Emirates: Aayan Afzal Khan, Rahul Bhatia, Muhammad Farooq, Syed Haider, Basil Hameed, Asif Khan, Ali Naseer, Akif Raja, Omid Shafi Rahman, Alishan Sharafu, Junaid Siddique, Vishnu Sukumaran, Tanish Suri (wk), Muhammad Waseem (c)

== Group stage ==
In the group stage, two groups of five teams played in a round-robin format for a total of 20 matches from 12 to 17 April 2024 across the two venues. The top two teams from each group: Nepal and Hong Kong from group A and Oman and the United Arab Emirates from group B advanced to the knockout stage.

Group A	Group B
Hong Kong; Malaysia; Nepal; Qatar; Saudi Arabia	Bahrain; Cambodia; Kuwait; Oman; United Arab Emirates

=== Group A ===
Group A standings
Pos	Team	Pld	W	L	NR	Pts	NRR	Qualification
1	Nepal	4	4	0	0	8	1.557	Advanced to the knockout stage
2	Hong Kong	4	2	2	0	4	−0.128	Advanced to the knockout stage
3	Qatar	4	2	2	0	4	−0.453	Eliminated
4	Saudi Arabia	4	1	3	0	2	0.306	Eliminated
5	Malaysia	4	1	3	0	2	−0.918	Eliminated

Source: ESPNcricinfo

Match 3
12 April 2024
14:30 UTC+4
Scorecard

Malaysia; 143/3 (20 overs)	v	Nepal; 144/5 (19.2 overs)
Virandeep Singh 72* (57); Dipendra Singh Airee 2/14 (4 overs)		Aasif Sheikh 32 (35); Virandeep Singh 3/35 (4 overs)

Nepal won by 5 wickets
Oman Cricket Academy Ground Turf 1, Al Amarat
Umpires: Tariq Rasheed (Pak) and Shiju Sam (UAE)
Player of the match: Dipendra Singh Airee (Nep)

- Malaysia won the toss and elected to bat.
- Nazmus Sakib (Mas) made his T20I debut.
- Rohit Paudel (Nep) scored his 1,000th run in T20Is.

Match 4
12 April 2024
14:30 UTC+4
Scorecard

Hong Kong; 201/7 (20 overs)	v	Qatar; 175/8 (20 overs)
Nizakat Khan 59 (37); Musawar Shah 2/20 (4 overs)		Saqlain Arshad 50 (34); Ehsan Khan 4/31 (4 overs)

Hong Kong won by 26 runs
Oman Cricket Academy Ground Turf 2, Al Amarat
Umpires: Viswanadan Kalidas (Mas) and Naveen D'Souza (Kuw)
Player of the match: Nizakat Khan (HK)

- Hong Kong won the toss and elected to bat.

Match 7
13 April 2024
14:30 UTC+4
Scorecard

Nepal; 210/7 (20 overs)	v	Qatar; 178/9 (20 overs)
Dipendra Singh Airee 64* (21); Himanshu Rathod 3/26 (4 overs)		Muhammad Tanveer 63 (33); Lalit Rajbanshi 2/23 (4 overs)

Nepal won by 32 runs
Oman Cricket Academy Ground Turf 1, Al Amarat
Umpires: Vinod Babu (Oma) and Shiju Sam (UAE)
Player of the match: Dipendra Singh Airee (Nep)

- Nepal won the toss and elected to bat.
- Dipendra Singh Airee (Nep) became the third T20I cricketer to score six sixes in one over.

Match 8
13 April 2024
14:30 UTC+4
Scorecard

Malaysia; 146/7 (20 overs)	v	Saudi Arabia; 134 (19.1 overs)
Aqeel Wahid 65* (46); Usman Najeeb 3/33 (4 overs)		Waji Ul Hassan 40 (29); Virandeep Singh 3/20 (3.1 overs)

Malaysia won by 12 runs
Oman Cricket Academy Ground Turf 2, Al Amarat
Umpires: Tabarak Dar (HK) and Morshed Ali Khan (Ban)
Player of the match: Aqeel Wahid (Mas)

- Malaysia won the toss and elected to bat.
- Ahmad Raza (Sau) made his T20I debut.

Match 10
14 April 2024
14:30 UTC+4
Scorecard

Saudi Arabia; 202/8 (20 overs)	v	Hong Kong; 147 (18.5 overs)
Abdul Waheed 77 (51); Ehsan Khan 3/31 (4 overs)		Nizakat Khan 73 (51); Zain Ul Abidin 3/16 (4 overs)

Saudi Arabia won by 55 runs
Oman Cricket Academy Ground Turf 2, Al Amarat
Umpires: Abdul Jabbar (Qat) and Tariq Rasheed (Pak)
Player of the match: Abdul Waheed (Sau)

- Saudi Arabia won the toss and elected to bat.
- Raunaq Kapur (HK) made his T20I debut.
- Faisal Khan (Sau) became the first Saudi Arabian player to score 1,000 runs in T20Is.

Match 11
15 April 2024
10:00 UTC+4
Scorecard

Hong Kong; 114 (17.5 overs)	v	Nepal; 117/2 (12.2 overs)
Anshuman Rath 34 (26); Abinash Bohara 3/29 (4 overs)		Aasif Sheikh 40 (18); Yasim Murtaza 1/28 (4 overs)

Nepal won by 8 wickets
Oman Cricket Academy Ground Turf 1, Al Amarat
Umpires: Abdul Jabbar (Qat) and Viswanadan Kalidas (Mas)
Player of the match: Abinash Bohara (Nep)

- Nepal won the toss and elected to field.
- The match was reduced to 18 overs per side due to rain.
- Aasif Sheikh (Nep) scored his 1,000th run in T20Is.

Match 12
15 April 2024
10:00 UTC+4
Scorecard

Malaysia; 151/5 (18 overs)	v	Qatar; 153/6 (17.2 overs)
Ahmad Faiz 38 (22); Himanshu Rathod 2/22 (4 overs)		Kamran Khan 37 (23); Virandeep Singh 2/33 (3.2 overs)

Qatar won by 4 wickets
Oman Cricket Academy Ground Turf 2, Al Amarat
Umpires: Rahul Asher (Oma) and Vinay Kumar Jha (Nep)
Player of the match: Himanshu Rathod (Qat)

- Qatar won the toss and elected to field.
- The match was reduced to 18 overs per side due to rain.

Match 15
16 April 2024
10:00 UTC+4
Scorecard

Qatar; 153/9 (20 overs)	v	Saudi Arabia; 138/8 (20 overs)
Muhammad Tanveer 43 (44); Usman Khalid 2/11 (4 overs)		Waji Ul Hassan 57 (40); Gayan Munaweera 2/27 (4 overs)

Qatar won by 15 runs
Oman Cricket Academy Ground Turf 1, Al Amarat
Umpires: Vinay Kumar Jha (Nep) and Morshed Ali Khan (Ban)
Player of the match: Gayan Munaweera (Qat)

- Saudi Arabia won the toss and elected to field.

Match 17
17 April 2024
10:00 UTC+4
Scorecard

Malaysia; 140/9 (20 overs)	v	Hong Kong; 144/3 (12.1 overs)
Ahmad Faiz 32 (31); Ayush Shukla 3/24 (4 overs)		Babar Hayat 83 (35); Pavandeep Singh 2/36 (4 overs)

Hong Kong won by 7 wickets
Oman Cricket Academy Ground Turf 1, Al Amarat
Umpires: Sundaram Ravi (Ind) and Shiju Sam (UAE)
Player of the match: Babar Hayat (HK)

- Hong Kong won the toss and elected to field.

Match 18
17 April 2024
10:00 UTC+4
Scorecard

Saudi Arabia; 73/7 (8 overs)	v	Nepal; 75/4 (7.2 overs)
Abdul Waheed 37 (16); Abinash Bohara 2/15 (2 overs)		Gulsan Jha 32* (19); Ishtiaq Ahmad 2/7 (2 overs)

Nepal won by 6 wickets
Oman Cricket Academy Ground Turf 2, Al Amarat
Umpires: Morshed Ali Khan (Ban) and Viswanadan Kalidas (Mas)
Player of the match: Gulsan Jha (Nep)

- Nepal won the toss and elected to field.
- The match was reduced to 8 overs per side due to a wet outfield.

=== Group B ===
Group B standings
Pos	Team	Pld	W	L	NR	Pts	NRR	Qualification
1	Oman (H)	4	4	0	0	8	2.149	Advanced to the knockout stage
2	United Arab Emirates	4	3	1	0	6	2.772	Advanced to the knockout stage
3	Kuwait	4	2	2	0	4	0.569	Eliminated
4	Bahrain	4	1	3	0	2	−0.031	Eliminated
5	Cambodia	4	0	4	0	0	−5.903	Eliminated

Source: ESPNcricinfo
(H) Hosts

Match 1
12 April 2024
10:00 UTC+4
Scorecard

Oman; 177/3 (20 overs)	v	Bahrain; 174/8 (20 overs)
Aqib Ilyas 62 (53); Abdul Majid 1/12 (2 overs)		Imran Ali 50 (34); Bilal Khan 2/19 (4 overs)

Oman won by 3 runs
Oman Cricket Academy Ground Turf 1, Al Amarat
Umpires: Prageeth Rambukwella (SL) and Sundaram Ravi (Ind)
Player of the match: Aqib Ilyas (Oma)

- Bahrain won the toss and elected to field.

Match 2
12 April 2024
10:00 UTC+4
Scorecard

Kuwait; 178/8 (20 overs)	v	United Arab Emirates; 179/3 (17.3 overs)
Clinto Anto 54 (23); Ali Naseer 3/26 (3 overs)		Alishan Sharafu 90* (48); Shahrukh Quddus 2/49 (4 overs)

United Arab Emirates won by 7 wickets
Oman Cricket Academy Ground Turf 2, Al Amarat
Umpires: Rahul Asher (Oma) and Morshed Ali Khan (Ban)
Player of the match: Alishan Sharafu (UAE)

- United Arab Emirates won the toss and elected field.
- Muhammad Farooq and Vishnu Sukumaran (UAE) both made their T20I debuts.

Match 5
13 April 2024
10:00 UTC+4
Scorecard

Cambodia; 141/5 (20 overs)	v	Kuwait; 144/2 (11.2 overs)
Ram Sharan 30 (30); Shahrukh Quddus 1/22 (3 overs)		Ravija Sandaruwan 61 (33); Luqman Butt 1/17 (2 overs)

Kuwait won by 8 wickets
Oman Cricket Academy Ground Turf 1, Al Amarat
Umpires: Viswanadan Kalidas (Mas) and Sundaram Ravi (Ind)
Player of the match: Ravija Sandaruwan (Kuw)

- Cambodia won the toss and elected to bat.
- Asanka Gunarathne and Vimukthi Viraj (Cam) both made their T20I debuts.

Match 6
13 April 2024
10:00 UTC+4
Scorecard

United Arab Emirates; 235/6 (20 overs)	v	Bahrain; 199/8 (20 overs)
Alishan Sharafu 78 (41); Imran Anwar 3/40 (3 overs)		Imran Anwar 60 (22); Aayan Afzal Khan 3/26 (4 overs)

United Arab Emirates won by 37 runs
Oman Cricket Academy Ground Turf 2, Al Amarat
Umpires: Vinay Kumar Jha (Nep) and Prageeth Rambukwella (SL)
Player of the match: Aayan Afzal Khan (UAE)

- Bahrain won the toss and elected to field.
- Syed Haider (UAE) made his T20I debut.

Match 9
14 April 2024
10:00 UTC+4
Scorecard

Oman; 154/6 (11 overs)	v	Cambodia; 91/7 (11 overs)
Naseem Khushi 69 (27); Sharwan Godara 2/25 (2 overs)		Luqman Butt 41* (21); Aqib Ilyas 4/17 (3 overs)

Oman won by 63 runs
Oman Cricket Academy Ground Turf 2, Al Amarat
Umpires: Ahmed Shah Durrani (Afg) and Naresh D'Souza (Kuw)
Player of the match: Aqib Ilyas (Oma)

- Cambodia won the toss and elected to field.
- The match was reduced to 11 overs per side due to rain.
- Aqib Ilyas (Oma) took his maiden hat-trick in T20Is.

Match 13
15 April 2024
14:30 UTC+4
Scorecard

United Arab Emirates; 142/5 (15 overs)	v	Oman; 147/1 (12.4 overs)
Asif Khan 66 (45); Bilal Khan 3/11 (3 overs)		Kashyap Prajapati 53* (38); Ali Naseer 1/21 (2 overs)

Oman won by 9 wickets
Oman Cricket Academy Ground Turf 1, Al Amarat
Umpires: Tabarak Dar (HK) and Sundaram Ravi (Ind)
Player of the match: Bilal Khan (Oma)

- Oman won the toss and elected to field.
- The match was reduced to 15 overs per side due to rain.
- Bilal Khan (Oma) took his 100th wicket in T20Is.

Match 14
15 April 2024
14:30 UTC+4
Scorecard

Kuwait; 161/7 (15 overs)	v	Bahrain; 135/6 (15 overs)
Meet Bhavsar 54 (36); Ali Dawood 2/25 (3 overs)		Sathaiya Veerapathiran 27* (15); Yasin Patel 3/8 (3 overs)

Kuwait won by 26 runs
Oman Cricket Academy Ground Turf 2, Al Amarat
Umpires: Vinod Babu (Oma) and Ahmed Shah Durrani (Afg)
Player of the match: Yasin Patel (Kuw)

- Bahrain won the toss and elected to field.
- The match was reduced to 15 overs per side due to rain.

Match 16
16 April 2024
14:30 UTC+4
Scorecard

Cambodia; 83 (17.2 overs)	v	Bahrain; 87/3 (13.1 overs)
Luqman Butt 21 (20); Ali Dawood 3/8 (2 overs)		Haider Butt 39* (27); Utkarsh Jain 2/8 (4 overs)

Bahrain won by 7 wickets
Oman Cricket Academy Ground Turf 1, Al Amarat
Umpires: Naresh D'Souza (Kuw) and Sundaram Ravi (Ind)
Player of the match: Ali Dawood (Bhr)

- Cambodia won the toss and elected to bat.

Match 19
17 April 2024
14:30 UTC+4
Scorecard

Cambodia; 76 (19 overs)	v	United Arab Emirates; 79/1 (5.1 overs)
Sharwan Godara 24 (18); Aayan Afzal Khan 3/7 (4 overs)		Muhammad Waseem 48 (18); Ram Sharan 1/11 (1 over)

United Arab Emirates won by 9 wickets
Oman Cricket Academy Ground Turf 1, Al Amarat
Umpires: Tabarak Dar (HK) and Prageeth Rambukwella (SL)
Player of the match: Aayan Afzal Khan (UAE)

- Cambodia won the toss and elected to bat.

Match 20
17 April 2024
14:30 UTC+4
Scorecard

Oman; 200/9 (20 overs)	v	Kuwait; 154/9 (20 overs)
Ayaan Khan 45 (20); Adnan Idrees 2/31 (4 overs)		Clinto Anto 34 (15); Zeeshan Maqsood 4/29 (4 overs)

Oman won by 46 runs
Oman Cricket Academy Ground Turf 2, Al Amarat
Umpires: Abdul Jabbar (Qat) and Vinay Kumar Jha (Nep)
Player of the match: Zeeshan Maqsood (Oma)

- Kuwait won the toss and elected to field.

== Knockout stage ==
The knockout stage consisted of two semi-finals played on 19 April, a 3rd place play-off on 20 April, and a final played on 21 April. The top 3 teams from the tournament: the United Arab Emirates, Oman and Hong Kong qualified for the 2025 Asia Cup and the 2024 ACC Emerging Teams Asia Cup. In October 2025, the ACC announced that the Emerging Teams Asia Cup would be discontinued and be replaced by the Asia Cup Rising Stars; with the inaugural 2025 Asia Cup Rising Stars featuring all the same teams from the 2024 ACC Emerging Teams Asia Cup.

=== Bracket ===
Semi-finals
A1	Nepal	119/9 (20 overs)
B2	United Arab Emirates	123/4 (17.2 overs)
B1	Oman	132/5 (19.2 overs)
A2	Hong Kong	130/9 (20 overs)

Final
SF1W	United Arab Emirates	204/4 (20 overs)
SF2W	Oman	149/9 (20 overs)
3rd place play-off
SF1L	Nepal	139/8 (20 overs)
SF2L	Hong Kong	140/6 (19.3 overs)

=== Semi-finals ===
Semi-final 1
19 April 2024
09:00 UTC+4
Scorecard

Nepal; 119/9 (20 overs)	v	United Arab Emirates; 123/4 (17.2 overs)
Sundeep Jora 50 (40); Basil Hameed 2/4 (2 overs)		Alishan Sharafu 55* (41); Gulsan Jha 2/21 (2.2 overs)

United Arab Emirates won by 6 wickets
Oman Cricket Academy Ground Turf 1, Al Amarat
Umpires: Rahul Asher (Oma) and Morshed Ali Khan (Ban)
Player of the match: Alishan Sharafu (UAE)

- United Arab Emirates won the toss and elected to field.

Semi-final 2
19 April 2024
14:30 UTC+4
Scorecard

Hong Kong; 130/9 (20 overs)	v	Oman; 132/5 (19.2 overs)
Zeeshan Ali 36* (25); Aqib Ilyas 3/14 (4 overs)		Aqib Ilyas 62* (51); Aizaz Khan 3/16 (4 overs)

Oman won by 5 wickets
Oman Cricket Academy Ground Turf 1, Al Amarat
Umpires: Prageeth Rambukwella (SL) and Tariq Rasheed (Pak)
Player of the match: Aqib Ilyas (Oma)

- Oman won the toss and elected to field.

=== 3rd place play-off ===
3rd place play-off
20 April 2024
14:30 UTC+4
Scorecard

Nepal; 139/8 (20 overs)	v	Hong Kong; 140/6 (19.3 overs)
Dipendra Singh Airee 44* (29); Ayush Shukla 3/17 (3 overs)		Anshuman Rath 65* (50); Sompal Kami 3/33 (4 overs)

Hong Kong won by 4 wickets
Oman Cricket Academy Ground Turf 1, Al Amarat
Umpires: Morshed Ali Khan (Ban) and Viswanadan Kalidas (Mas)
Player of the match: Anshuman Rath (HK)

- Nepal won the toss and elected to bat.

=== Final ===
Final
21 April 2024
14:30 UTC+4
Scorecard

United Arab Emirates; 204/4 (20 overs)	v	Oman; 149/9 (20 overs)
Muhammad Waseem 100 (56); Bilal Khan 2/35 (4 overs)		Pratik Athavale 49 (30); Junaid Siddique 3/38 (4 overs)

United Arab Emirates won by 55 runs
Oman Cricket Academy Ground Turf 1, Al Amarat
Umpires: Tariq Rasheed (Pak) and Sundaram Ravi (Ind)
Player of the match: Muhammad Waseem (UAE)

- Oman won the toss and elected to field.

== See also ==
- International cricket in 2024
- Associate international cricket in 2024
- International cricket in 2023–24
- Associate international cricket in 2023–24
- 2024 ACC Women's Premier Cup
