= 2023 ACC Men's Challenger Cup =

International associate cricket tournament

- Dates: 24 February – 5 March 2023
- Administrator: Asian Cricket Council
- Cricket format: Limited overs cricket
- Tournament format(s): Group stage and knockout stage
- Host: Thailand
- Champions: Saudi Arabia (1st title)
- Runners-up: Bahrain
- Participants: 8
- Matches: 15
- Most runs: (Indonesia) Padmakar Surve (199)
- Most wickets: (Saudi Arabia) Ishtiaq Ahmad (Bahrain) Abdul Majid (12 each)

The 2023 ACC Men's Challenger Cup was the inaugural edition of the ACC Men's Challenger Cup, hosted by the Cricket Association of Thailand from 24 February to 5 March 2023. Eight associate teams competed in 15 matches across two venues in Thailand. Saudi Arabia defeated Bahrain in the final to become the inaugural champions. Both teams advanced to the 2023 ACC Men's Premier Cup.

== Background ==
The ACC Men's Challenger Cup is a biennial international cricket competition organised by the Asian Cricket Council (ACC), which alternates between 50-overs and 20-overs cricket. In January 2023, the tournament was announced as a part of the associate teams' qualification pathway for the Asia Cup and the ACC Emerging Teams Asia Cup.

=== Format ===
The eight participating teams were divided into two groups of four teams each. In the group stage, each team played each of the other teams in the group once in a round-robin format for 12 matches, and the top two teams in each group advanced to the knockout stage. The knockout stage consisted of two semi-finals and a final. In the 2023 tournament, all the matches were played in 50-over format as limited overs cricket matches without international status.

=== Teams ===
The top eight associate teams based on the ICC T20I rankings directly qualified for the Premier Cup, while the next ranked eight teams: Bahrain, Bhutan, Indonesia, Iran, Maldives, Myanmar, Saudi Arabia, and Thailand played in the Challenger Cup.

=== Venues ===
Tournament venues in Thailand

The tournament was played across two venues in Bangkok, Thailand; seven matches at Asian Institute of Technology Ground (including semi-final 1); and eight matches at Terdthai Cricket Ground (including semi-final 2 and final).

== Group stage ==
In the group stage, two groups of four teams played in a round-robin format for a total of 12 matches from 24 February to 1 March 2023 across the two venues. The top two teams from each group: Bahrain and Bhutan from group A and Saudi Arabia and Thailand from group B advanced to the knockout stage.

Group A	Group B
Bahrain; Bhutan; Iran; Maldives	Indonesia; Myanmar; Saudi Arabia; Thailand

=== Group A ===
Group A standings
Pos	Team	Pld	W	L	NR	Pts	NRR	Qualification
1	Bahrain	3	3	0	0	6	4.844	Advanced to the knockout stage
2	Bhutan	3	1	2	0	2	−0.340	Advanced to the knockout stage
3	Iran	3	1	2	0	2	−0.704	Eliminated
4	Maldives	3	1	2	0	2	−2.473	Eliminated

Source: Asian Cricket Council

Match 1
24 February 2023
10:00 UTC+7
Scorecard

Bhutan; 104 (32.2 overs)	v	Bahrain; 105/3 (29.3 overs)
Thinley Jamtsho 30 (34); Sathaiya Veerapathiran 3/15 (6.1 overs)		Junaid Aziz 56 (85); Suprit Pradhan 2/18 (4.3 overs)

Bahrain won by 7 wickets
Asian Institute of Technology Ground, Bangkok
Umpires: Samad Akbar (Tha) and Durga Subedi (Nep)

- Bahrain won the toss and elected to field.

Match 2
24 February 2023
10:00 UTC+7
Scorecard

Maldives; 157 (31.2 overs)	v	Iran; 130 (42.3 overs)
Umar Adam 58 (40); Zahed Afarin 5/22 (8.2 overs)		Zahed Afarin 25 (59); Umar Adam 4/22 (10 overs)

Maldives won by 27 runs
Terdthai Cricket Ground, Bangkok
Umpires: Anand Natarajan (Sin) and Arif Ansari (Tha)

- Maldives won the toss and elected to bat.

Match 5
26 February 2023
09:30 UTC+7
Scorecard

Bahrain; 380/6 (50 overs)	v	Maldives; 88 (31.3 overs)
Shahbaz Badar 178 (144); Ibrahim Hassan 3/79 (10 overs)		Mohamed Mahfooz 35 (41); Sathaiya Veerapathiran 2/3 (4 overs)

Bahrain won by 292 runs
Asian Institute of Technology Ground, Bangkok
Umpires: Anand Natarajan (Sin) and Narayanan Sivan (Mas)

- Bahrain won the toss and elected to bat.

Match 6
26 February 2023
09:30 UTC+7
Scorecard

Iran; 150 (48.3 overs)	v	Bhutan; 100 (24 overs)
Abdolvahab Ebrahimpour 37 (69); Tenzin Wangchuk 2/19 (10 overs)		Gakul Ghalley 22 (29); Masood Jayezeh 4/37 (7 overs)

Iran won by 50 runs
Terdthai Cricket Ground, Bangkok
Umpires: Rahat Ali (Sau) and Durga Subedi (Nep)

- Iran won the toss and elected to bat.

Match 9
28 February 2023
09:30 UTC+7
Scorecard

Maldives; 105 (42.2 overs)	v	Bhutan; 106/6 (28.1 overs)
Umar Adam 23 (22); Ngawang Thinley 3/25 (10 overs)		Jigme Singye 24 (49); Leem Shafeeg 4/11 (5 overs)

Bhutan won by 4 wickets
Asian Institute of Technology Ground, Bangkok
Umpires: Samad Akbar (Tha) and Rahat Ali (Sau)

- Bhutan won the toss and elected to field.

Match 10
28 February 2023
09:30 UTC+7
Scorecard

Iran; 46 (19.5 overs)	v	Bahrain; 50/0 (4 overs)
Abbas Ali Raeisi 14* (41); Abdul Majid 4/12 (6.5 overs)		Sohail Ahmed 30* (12)

Bahrain won by 10 wickets
Terdthai Cricket Ground, Bangkok
Umpires: Arif Ansari (Tha) and Narayanan Sivan (Mas)

- Iran won the toss and elected to bat.

=== Group B ===
Group B standings
Pos	Team	Pld	W	L	NR	Pts	NRR	Qualification
1	Saudi Arabia	3	3	0	0	6	4.844	Advanced to the knockout stage
2	Thailand (H)	3	2	1	0	4	2.053	Advanced to the knockout stage
3	Indonesia	3	1	2	0	2	0.243	Eliminated
4	Myanmar	3	0	3	0	0	−5.293	Eliminated

Source: Asian Cricket Council
(H) Hosts

Match 3
25 February 2023
09:30 UTC+7
Scorecard

Indonesia; 117 (29.3 overs)	v	Saudi Arabia; 118/2 (25 overs)
Padmakar Surve 63 (73); Zuhair 3/14 (3.3 overs)		Waqar Ul Hassan 49* (67); Ferdinando Banunaek 1/9 (2 overs)

Saudi Arabia won by 8 wickets
Asian Institute of Technology Ground, Bangkok
Umpires: Samad Akbar (Tha) and Arif Ansari (Tha)

- Saudi Arabia won the toss and elected to field.

Match 4
25 February 2023
09:30 UTC+7
Scorecard

Thailand; 332/6 (50 overs)	v	Myanmar; 60 (24.3 overs)
Daniel Jacobs 152 (143); Htet Lin Oo 3/58 (7 overs)		Swan Htet Ko Ko 22 (31); Chanchai Pengkumta 3/19 (5 overs)

Thailand won by 272 runs
Terdthai Cricket Ground, Bangkok
Umpires: Rahat Ali (Sau) and Narayanan Sivan (Mas)

- Thailand won the toss and elected to bat.

Match 7
27 February 2023
09:30 UTC+7
Scorecard

Thailand; 80 (25.2 overs)	v	Saudi Arabia; 81/1 (15.4 overs)
Akshay Yadav 19 (43); Zain-ul-Abidin 3/18 (6.2 overs)		Waqar Ul Hassan 34* (35); Jandre Coetzee 1/5 (3 overs)

Saudi Arabia won by 9 wickets
Asian Institute of Technology Ground, Bangkok
Umpires: Anand Natarajan (Sin) and Durga Subedi (Nep)

- Saudi Arabia won the toss and elected to field.

Match 8
27 February 2023
09:30 UTC+7
Scorecard

Indonesia; 300/8 (50 overs)	v	Myanmar; 105 (28.5 overs)
Padmakar Surve 128 (91); Nyein Chan Soe 3/38 (7 overs)		Ko Ko Lin Thu 22 (30); Gede Arta 5/23 (6.5 overs)

Indonesia won by 195 runs
Terdthai Cricket Ground, Bangkok
Umpires: Samad Akbar (Tha) and Arif Ansari (Tha)

- Indonesia won the toss and elected to bat.

Match 11
1 March 2023
09:30 UTC+7
Scorecard

Indonesia; 125 (42 overs)	v	Thailand; 127/6 (28.5 overs)
Danilson Hawoe 37 (50); Nopphon Senamontree 5/13 (10 overs)		Phiriyapong Suanchuai 44 (65); Ferdinando Banunaek 3/21 (5.5 overs)

Thailand won by 4 wickets
Asian Institute of Technology Ground, Bangkok
Umpires: Rahat Ali (Sau) and Anand Natarajan (Sin)

- Thailand won the toss and elected to field.

Match 12
1 March 2023
09:30 UTC+7
Scorecard

Saudi Arabia; 424/7 (50 overs)	v	Myanmar; 97 (25.2 overs)
Abdul Manan Ali 102* (80); Aung Ko Ko 2/72 (8 overs)		Ye Naing Tun 29 (31); Ahmed Baladraf 4/30 (8.3 overs)

Saudi Arabia won by 327 runs
Terdthai Cricket Ground, Bangkok
Umpires: Narayanan Sivan (Mas) and Durga Subedi (Nep)

- Saudi Arabia won the toss and elected to bat.

== Knockout stage ==
The knockout stage consisted of two semi-finals played on 3 March, and a final played on 5 March. The top two teams (winners of the semi-finals / finalists): Saudi Arabia and Bahrain qualified for the 2023 ACC Men's Premier Cup.

=== Bracket ===
Semi-finals
A1	Bahrain	169 (45.5 overs)
B2	Thailand	91 (26.4 overs)
B1	Saudi Arabia	63/1 (12.3 overs)
A2	Bhutan	62 (22.2 overs)

Final
SF1W	Bahrain	26 (21.1 overs)
SF2W	Saudi Arabia	30/0 (4.1 overs)

=== Semi-finals ===
Semi-final 1
3 March 2023
09:30 UTC+7
Scorecard

Bahrain; 169 (45.5 overs)	v	Thailand; 91 (26.4 overs)
Sohail Ahmed 64 (115); Jandre Coetzee 4/18 (8 overs)		Robert Raina 28 (41); Zeeshan Abbas 4/33 (7 overs)

Bahrain won by 78 runs
Asian Institute of Technology Ground, Bangkok
Umpires: Rahat Ali (Sau) and Durga Subedi (Nep)

- Thailand won the toss and elected to field.

Semi-final 2
3 March 2023
09:30 UTC+7
Scorecard

Bhutan; 62 (22.2 overs)	v	Saudi Arabia; 63/1 (12.3 overs)
Suprit Pradhan 24 (29); Ishtiaq Ahmad 4/7 (5 overs)		Waqar Ul Hassan 41* (41)

Saudi Arabia won by 9 wickets
Terdthai Cricket Ground, Bangkok
Umpires: Anand Natarajan (Sin) and Narayanan Sivan (Mas)

- Bhutan won the toss and elected to bat.

=== Final ===
Final
5 March 2023
09:30 UTC+7
Scorecard

Bahrain; 26 (21.1 overs)	v	Saudi Arabia; 30/0 (4.1 overs)
Abdul Majid 7 (42); Atif-Ur-Rehman 4/10 (8 overs)		Waqar Ul Hassan 16* (13)

Saudi Arabia won by 10 wickets
Terdthai Cricket Ground, Bangkok
Umpires: Durga Subedi (Nep) and Narayanan Sivan (Mas)

- Saudi Arabia won the toss and elected to field.

== See also ==
- International cricket in 2022–23
- Associate international cricket in 2022–23
- International cricket in 2023
- Associate international cricket in 2023
