= 2023 ACC Men's Premier Cup =

International associate cricket tournament

- Dates: 18 April – 2 May 2023
- Administrator: Asian Cricket Council
- Cricket format: Limited overs cricket One Day International
- Tournament format(s): Group stage and knockout stage
- Host: Nepal
- Champions: Nepal (1st title)
- Runners-up: United Arab Emirates
- Participants: 10
- Matches: 24
- Most runs: (United Arab Emirates) Vriitya Aravind (454)
- Most wickets: (Oman) Bilal Khan (17)

The 2023 ACC Men's Premier Cup was the inaugural edition of the ACC Men's Premier Cup, hosted by the Cricket Association of Nepal from 18 April to 2 May 2023. Ten associate teams competed in 24 matches across two venues in Nepal, of whom eight teams directly qualified for the tournament through ICC T20I rankings and two advanced from the 2023 Challenger Cup. Hosts Nepal defeated the United Arab Emirates in the final, to become the inaugural champions. Nepal qualified for the 2023 Asia Cup, while Nepal, the United Arab Emirates and Oman qualified for the 2023 ACC Emerging Teams Asia Cup.

== Background ==
The ACC Men's Premier Cup is a biennial international cricket competition in limited overs cricket format (an alternating format of 50-overs and 20-overs cricket), organised by the Asian Cricket Council (ACC). In January 2023, the tournament was announced as a part of the associate teams' qualification pathway for the Asia Cup and the ACC Emerging Teams Asia Cup.

=== Format ===
The 10 participating teams were divided into two groups of five teams each. In the group stage, each team played each of the other teams in the group once in a round-robin format for 20 matches, and the top two teams in each group advanced to the knockout stage. The knockout stage consisted of two semi-finals, a third-place play-off and a final. In the 2023 tournament, all the matches were played in 50-over format; of which only the matches involving associate teams with ODI status had international status as One Day International (ODI), while other matches were played without international status.

=== Teams ===
The top 8 associate teams based on the ICC T20I rankings: Hong Kong, Kuwait, Malaysia, Nepal, Oman, Qatar, Singapore and the United Arab Emirates directly qualified for the Premier Cup, while the next ranked 8 teams played in the Challenger Cup. Top 2 teams in the 2023 Challenger Cup: Saudi Arabia and Bahrain advanced to the Premier Cup.

== Venues ==
The tournament was played across 2 venues in Nepal: 11 matches at Mulpani International Cricket Ground in Kageshwari-Manohara (including semi-final 2) and 13 matches at Tribhuvan University International Cricket Ground in Kirtipur (including semi-final 1, 3rd place play-off and final).

Venues in Nepal
A map of Nepal with pin-points on 2023 ACC Men's Premier Cup venues
Kageshwari-Manohara	Kirtipur
Mulpani International Cricket Ground	Tribhuvan University International Cricket Ground
Capacity: 4,000	Capacity: 13,000
Matches: 11 (Semi-final 2)	Matches: 13 (Semi-final 1, 3rd place play-off & final)
Mulpani International Cricket Ground in 2023	Tribhuvan University International Cricket Ground in 2025

== Squads ==
Following squads were announced for the tournament:

- Bahrain: Fiaz Ahmed, Sohail Ahmed, Waseeq Ahmed, Imran Anwar, Junaid Aziz, Haider Butt (c), Shahbaz Badar (wk), Rizwan Butt, Ali Dawood, Abdul Majid, David Mathias, Sai Sarthak, Sathaiya Veerapathiran, Muhammad Younis
- Hong Kong: Zeeshan Ali (wk), Haroon Arshad, Mohammad Ghazanfar, Adit Gorawara (wk), Babar Hayat, Aizaz Khan, Ehsan Khan, Nizakat Khan (c), Yasim Murtaza, Nasrulla Rana, Anshuman Rath, Kinchit Shah, Ayush Shukla, Shahid Wasif
- Kuwait: Ilyas Ahmed, Mohammad Amin, Clinto Anto, Mohammed Aslam (c), Meet Bhavsar (wk), Adnan Idrees, Shiraz Khan, Parvindar Kumar, Sayed Monib, Usman Patel (wk), Yasin Patel, Shahrukh Quddus, Ravija Sandaruwan, Bilal Tahir
- Malaysia: Muhammad Amir, Wan Azam, Syed Aziz, Ahmad Faiz (c), Rizwan Haider, Khizar Hayat, Sharvin Muniandy, Anwar Rahman, Nazril Rahman, Fitri Sham, Virandeep Singh (wk), Muhamad Syahadat, Vijay Unni, Muhammad Wafiq
- Nepal: Dipendra Singh Airee, Kushal Bhurtel, Pratis GC, Gulsan Jha, Sompal Kami, Karan KC, Sandeep Lamichhane, Gyanendra Malla, Kushal Malla, Rohit Paudel (c), Lalit Rajbanshi, Bhim Sharki, Aarif Sheikh, Aasif Sheikh (wk)
- Oman: Fayyaz Butt, Sandeep Goud, Aqib Ilyas, Kaleemullah, Ayaan Khan, Bilal Khan, Shoaib Khan, Naseem Khushi (wk), Zeeshan Maqsood (c), Mohammad Nadeem, Jay Odedra, Kashyap Prajapati, Adeel Shafique (wk), Jatinder Singh
- Qatar: Owais Ahmed, Amir Farooq, Zaheer Ibrahim, Ikramullah Khan, Kamran Khan, Imal Liyanage (wk), Gayan Munaweera, Muhammad Murad, Mohammed Nadeem, Mohammed Rizlan (c, wk), Khurram Shahzad, Muhammad Tanveer, Valeed Veetil, Sandun Withanage
- Saudi Arabia: Ishtiaq Ahmad, Manan Ali, Imran Arif, Atif-Ur-Rehman, Ahmed Baladraf, Haseeb Ghafoor (wk), Saad Khan, Usman Najeeb, Hisham Sheikh (c), Zain Ul Abidin, Waqar Ul Hassan, Abdul Waheed, Abdul Wahid, Zuhair
- Singapore: Vinoth Baskaran, Abdul Rahman Bhadelia, Adwitya Bhargava, Surendran Chandramohan, Avi Dixit, Aritra Dutta (c), Ramesh Kalimuthu, Amartya Kaul, Vinit Mehta, Aaryan Modi, Thilipan Omaidurai, Prasheen Param, Akshay Puri, Rohan Rangarajan, Manpreet Singh (wk), Sidhant Srikanth
- United Arab Emirates: Vriitya Aravind (wk), Basil Hameed, Aayan Afzal Khan, Asif Khan, Matiullah Khan, Zahoor Khan, Aryan Lakra, Karthik Meiyappan, Rohan Mustafa, Rameez Shahzad, Sanchit Sharma, Junaid Siddique, Ansh Tandon, Muhammad Waseem (c)

== Group stage ==
In the group stage, two groups of five teams played in a round-robin format for a total of 20 matches from 18 to 27 April 2023 across the two venues. The top two teams from each group: Nepal and Oman from group A and the United Arab Emirates and Kuwait from group B advanced to the knockout stage.

Group A	Group B
Malaysia; Nepal; Oman; Qatar; Saudi Arabia	Bahrain; Hong Kong; Kuwait; Singapore; United Arab Emirates

=== Group A ===
Group A standings
Pos	Team	Pld	W	L	NR	Pts	NRR	Qualification
1	Nepal (H)	4	3	0	1	7	1.497	Advanced to the knockout stage
2	Oman	4	3	1	0	6	0.377	Advanced to the knockout stage
3	Malaysia	4	2	2	0	4	0.240	Eliminated
4	Saudi Arabia	4	1	2	1	3	−1.101	Eliminated
5	Qatar	4	0	4	0	0	−1.056	Eliminated

Source: ESPNcricinfo
(H) Hosts

Match 1
18 April 2023
09:00 UTC+5:45
Scorecard

Malaysia; 235/9 (50 overs)	v	Nepal; 237/4 (36.2 overs)
Ahmad Faiz 76 (95); Sompal Kami 3/40 (9 overs)		Bhim Sharki 71 (98); Virandeep Singh 1/37 (7 overs)

Nepal won by 6 wickets
Tribhuvan University International Cricket Ground, Kirtipur
Umpires: Naresh D'Souza (Kuw) and Shiju Sam (UAE)
Player of the match: Kushal Malla (Nep)

- Malaysia won the toss and elected to bat.

Match 4
19 April 2023
09:00 UTC+5:45
Scorecard

Oman; 249/8 (50 overs)	v	Qatar; 209 (47.2 overs)
Ayaan Khan 64* (59); Muhammad Murad 3/47 (10 overs)		Mohammed Rizlan 43 (69); Bilal Khan 4/42 (8.2 overs)

Oman won by 40 runs
Mulpani International Cricket Ground, Kageshwari-Manohara
Umpires: Himal Giri (Nep) and Anand Natarajan (Sin)
Player of the match: Ayaan Khan (Oma)

- Qatar won the toss and elected to field.

Match 6
20 April 2023
09:00 UTC+5:45
Scorecard

Saudi Arabia; 153 (46.2 overs)	v	Malaysia; 154/2 (21.2 overs)
Haseeb Ghafoor 40 (78); Khizar Hayat 3/13 (10 overs)		Muhammad Amir 56 (44); Zain Ul Abidin 2/46 (8.2 overs)

Malaysia won by 8 wickets
Mulpani International Cricket Ground, Kageshwari-Manohara
Umpires: Sanjay Gurung (Nep) and John Prakash (HK)
Player of the match: Khizar Hayat (Mas)

- Malaysia won the toss and elected to field.

Match 7
21 April 2023
09:00 UTC+5:45
Scorecard

Nepal; 310/8 (50 overs)	v	Oman; 226 (46.3 overs)
Kushal Malla 108 (64); Ayaan Khan 2/46 (5 overs)		Mohammad Nadeem 65 (84); Sandeep Lamichhane 3/45 (8 overs)

Nepal won by 84 runs
Tribhuvan University International Cricket Ground, Kirtipur
Umpires: Naresh D'Souza (Kuw) and Shiju Sam (UAE)
Player of the match: Kushal Malla (Nep)

- Oman won the toss and elected to field.
- Adeel Shafique (Oma) made his ODI debut.
- Kushal Malla (Nep) scored his maiden century in ODIs.
- Sandeep Lamichhane (Nep) became the fastest bowler to take 100 wickets in ODIs, in terms of number of matches played (42).

Match 9
22 April 2023
09:00 UTC+5:45
Scorecard

Qatar; 216 (49.5 overs)	v	Saudi Arabia; 220/3 (34.2 overs)
Muhammad Tanveer 46 (84); Ishtiaq Ahmad 4/46 (9.5 overs)		Abdul Waheed 124 (108); Ikramullah Khan 2/28 (5 overs)

Saudi Arabia won by 7 wickets
Tribhuvan University International Cricket Ground, Kirtipur
Umpires: Aasif Iqbal (UAE) and John Prakash (HK)
Player of the match: Abdul Waheed (Sau)

- Saudi Arabia won the toss and elected field.

Match 12
23 April 2023
09:00 UTC+5:45
Scorecard

Malaysia; 227/9 (50 overs)	v	Oman; 228/2 (41.4 overs)
Virandeep Singh 94 (144); Zeeshan Maqsood 4/35 (10 overs)		Jatinder Singh 101* (111); Muhammad Amir 2/26 (6 overs)

Oman won by 8 wickets
Mulpani International Cricket Ground, Kageshwari-Manohara
Umpires: Sanjay Gurung (Nep) and Shiju Sam (UAE)
Player of the match: Zeeshan Maqsood (Oma)

- Oman won the toss and elected to field.

Match 14
24 April 2023
09:00 UTC+5:45
Scorecard

Nepal	v	Saudi Arabia

Match abandoned
Mulpani International Cricket Ground, Kageshwari-Manohara
Umpires: Naresh D'Souza (Kuw) and Riyaz Kurupkar (Qat)

- No toss.
- No play was possible due to rain.

Match 16
25 April 2023
09:00 UTC+5:45
Scorecard

Qatar; 215/8 (35 overs)	v	Malaysia; 216/7 (34.1 overs)
Imal Liyanage 56 (68); Muhammad Wafiq 2/42 (5 overs)		Syed Aziz 80 (66); Ikramullah Khan 2/35 (5.1 overs)

Malaysia won by 3 wickets
Mulpani International Cricket Ground, Kageshwari-Manohara
Umpires: Vinod Babu (Oma) and Vinay Kumar Jha (Nep)
Player of the match: Syed Aziz (Mas)

- Qatar won the toss and elected to bat.
- The match was reduced to 35 overs per side due to a wet outfield.

Match 17
26 April 2023
09:00 UTC+5:45
Scorecard

Oman; 366/6 (50 overs)	v	Saudi Arabia; 294 (46.5 overs)
Jatinder Singh 88 (79); Atif-Ur-Rehman 3/80 (9 overs)		Abdul Waheed 95 (86); Bilal Khan 4/75 (8.5 overs)

Oman won by 72 runs
Tribhuvan University International Cricket Ground, Kirtipur
Umpires: Sanjay Gurung (Nep) and Anand Natarajan (Sin)
Player of the match: Zeeshan Maqsood (Oma)

- Saudi Arabia won the toss and elected to field.

Match 19
27 April 2023
09:00 UTC+5:45
Scorecard

Nepal; 157 (40.3 overs)	v	Qatar; 89 (25.1 overs)
Sandeep Lamichhane 42* (58); Amir Farooq 4/42 (9.3 overs)		Zaheer Ibrahim 15 (23); Sandeep Lamichhane 5/14 (9.1 overs)

Nepal won by 68 runs
Tribhuvan University International Cricket Ground, Kirtipur
Umpires: Vinod Babu (Oma) and Naresh D'Souza (Kuw)
Player of the match: Sandeep Lamichhane (Nep)

- Qatar won the toss and elected to field.

=== Group B ===
Group B standings
Pos	Team	Pld	W	L	NR	Pts	NRR	Qualification
1	United Arab Emirates	4	3	1	0	6	2.468	Advanced to the knockout stage
2	Kuwait	4	3	1	0	6	0.223	Advanced to the knockout stage
3	Hong Kong	4	2	1	1	5	1.031	Eliminated
4	Bahrain	4	1	2	1	3	0.019	Eliminated
5	Singapore	4	0	4	0	0	−3.028	Eliminated

Source: ESPNcricinfo

Match 2
18 April 2023
09:00 UTC+5:45
Scorecard

Singapore; 174 (42.1 overs)	v	Hong Kong; 175/2 (33 overs)
Aritra Dutta 49 (57); Ehsan Khan 4/24 (10 overs)		Babar Hayat 108* (94); Ramesh Kalimuthu 1/31 (7 overs)

Hong Kong won by 8 wickets
Mulpani International Cricket Ground, Kageshwari-Manohara
Umpires: Aasif Iqbal (UAE) and Vinay Kumar Jha (Nep)
Player of the match: Babar Hayat (HK)

- Hong Kong won the toss and elected to field.

Match 3
19 April 2023
09:00 UTC+5:45
Scorecard

United Arab Emirates; 371/6 (50 overs)	v	Kuwait; 228 (36.3 overs)
Vriitya Aravind 185 (147); Parvindar Kumar 2/45 (3 overs)		Sayed Monib 68 (36); Junaid Siddique 3/32 (7 overs)

United Arab Emirates won by 143 runs
Tribhuvan University International Cricket Ground, Kirtipur
Umpires: Riyaz Kurupkar (Qat) and Narayanan Sivan (Mas)
Player of the match: Vriitya Aravind (UAE)

- Kuwait won the toss and elected to field.

Match 5
20 April 2023
09:00 UTC+5:45
Scorecard

Bahrain; 286/8 (50 overs)	v	Singapore; 154 (43.1 overs)
Fiaz Ahmed 79 (59); Vinoth Baskaran 2/32 (10 overs)		Surendran Chandramohan 51 (66); Imran Anwar 4/24 (9 overs)

Bahrain won by 132 runs
Tribhuvan University International Cricket Ground, Kirtipur
Umpires: Rahat Ali (Sau) and Vinod Babu (Oma)
Player of the match: Shahbaz Badar (Bhr)

- Bahrain won the toss and elected to bat.

Match 8
21 April 2023
09:00 UTC+5:45
Scorecard

Hong Kong; 263/8 (50 overs)	v	United Arab Emirates; 117/6 (27 overs)
Anshuman Rath 106 (117); Aayan Afzal Khan 5/50 (10 overs)		Aryan Lakra 52* (71); Ehsan Khan 2/23 (5 overs)

Hong Kong won by 67 runs (DLS method)
Mulpani International Cricket Ground, Kageshwari-Manohara
Umpires: Vinod Babu (Oma) and Vinay Kumar Jha (Nep)
Player of the match: Anshuman Rath (HK)

- United Arab Emirates won the toss and elected to field.
- No further play was possible due to rain.

Match 10
22 April 2023
09:00 UTC+5:45
Scorecard

Bahrain; 255/7 (50 overs)	v	Kuwait; 258/8 (44.2 overs)
Imran Anwar 53 (19); Sayed Monib 4/69 (10 overs)		Yasin Patel 63* (89); Abdul Majid 3/51 (9 overs)

Kuwait won by 2 wickets
Mulpani International Cricket Ground, Kageshwari-Manohara
Umpires: Rahat Ali (Sau) and Anand Natarajan (Sin)
Player of the match: Yasin Patel (Kuw)

- Kuwait won the toss and elected to field.

Match 11
23 April 2023
09:00 UTC+5:45
Scorecard

United Arab Emirates; 471 (50 overs)	v	Singapore; 270/9 (50 overs)
Vriitya Aravind 174 (133); Adwitya Bhargava 4/85 (8 overs)		Manpreet Singh 66 (64); Sanchit Sharma 2/32 (4 overs)

United Arab Emirates won by 201 runs
Tribhuvan University International Cricket Ground, Kirtipur
Umpires: Vinod Babu (Oma) and Narayanan Sivan (Mas)
Player of the match: Muhammad Waseem (UAE)

- United Arab Emirates won the toss and elected to bat.

Match 13
24 April 2023
09:00 UTC+5:45
Scorecard

Bahrain	v	Hong Kong

Match abandoned
Tribhuvan University International Cricket Ground, Kirtipur
Umpires: Rahat Ali (Sau) and Anand Natarajan (Sin)

- No toss.
- No play was possible due to rain.

Match 15
25 April 2023
09:00 UTC+5:45
Scorecard

Singapore; 113 (31.4 overs)	v	Kuwait; 118/6 (26.3 overs)
Amartya Kaul 45 (60); Mohammed Aslam 5/20 (8.4 overs)		Adnan Idrees 38 (28); Akshay Puri 2/33 (8.3 overs)

Kuwait won by 4 wickets
Tribhuvan University International Cricket Ground, Kirtipur
Umpires: Aasif Iqbal (UAE) and John Prakash (HK)
Player of the match: Mohammed Aslam (Kuw)

- Kuwait won the toss and elected to field.

Match 18
26 April 2023
09:00 UTC+5:45
Scorecard

Bahrain; 116 (40.5 overs)	v	United Arab Emirates; 120/2 (27.4 overs)
Ali Dawood 23* (47); Aayan Afzal Khan 4/6 (10 overs)		Vriitya Aravind 62* (84); Abdul Majid 2/29 (10 overs)

United Arab Emirates won by 8 wickets
Mulpani International Cricket Ground, Kageshwari-Manohara
Umpires: Rahat Ali (Sau) and Vinay Kumar Jha (Nep)
Player of the match: Aayan Afzal Khan (UAE)

- Bahrain won the toss and elected to bat.

Match 20
27 April 2023
09:00 UTC+5:45
Scorecard

Kuwait; 272/8 (50 overs)	v	Hong Kong; 242 (50 overs)
Shiraz Khan 67 (95); Ehsan Khan 3/49 (10 overs)		Nizakat Khan 60 (97); Shahrukh Quddus 3/27 (8 overs)

Kuwait won by 30 runs
Mulpani International Cricket Ground, Kageshwari-Manohara
Umpires: Sanjay Gurung (Nep) and Shiju Sam (UAE)
Player of the match: Shiraz Khan (Kuw)

- Hong Kong won the toss and elected to field.

== Knockout stage ==
The knockout stage consisted of two semi-finals played on 29 April, a 3rd place play-off on 30 April, and a final scheduled for 1 May. The winners of the tournament: Nepal qualified for the 2023 Asia Cup, while the top 3 teams: Nepal, the United Arab Emirates and Oman qualified for the 2023 ACC Emerging Teams Asia Cup.

=== Bracket ===
Semi-finals
A1	Nepal	281/9 (42 overs)
B2	Kuwait	37/6 (8.3 overs)
B1	United Arab Emirates	236 (49.2 overs)
A2	Oman	190/6 (43 overs)

Final
SF1W	Nepal	118/3 (30.3 overs)
SF2W	United Arab Emirates	117 (33.1 overs)
3rd place play-off
SF1L	Kuwait	130 (31.3 overs)
SF2L	Oman	41/0 (6 overs)

=== Semi-finals ===
Semi-final 1
29 April 2023
09:00 UTC+5:45
Scorecard

Nepal; 281/9 (42 overs)	v	Kuwait; 37/6 (8.3 overs)
Rohit Paudel 94 (95); Mohammed Aslam 3/43 (8 overs)		Mohammed Aslam 14 (19); Karan KC 5/10 (4.3 overs)

No result
Tribhuvan University International Cricket Ground, Kirtipur
Umpires: Vinod Babu (Oma) and Shiju Sam (UAE)

- Kuwait won the toss and elected to field.
- No further play was possible due to rain.
- Nepal were considered winners on the basis of finishing higher in the group stage standings and advanced to the final.

Semi-final 2
29 April 2023
09:00 UTC+5:45
Scorecard

United Arab Emirates; 236 (49.2 overs)	v	Oman; 190/6 (43 overs)
Muhammad Waseem 48 (31); Zeeshan Maqsood 4/32 (10 overs)		Kashyap Prajapati 49 (43); Karthik Meiyappan 3/42 (7 overs)

United Arab Emirates won by 2 runs (DLS method)
Mulpani International Cricket Ground, Kageshwari-Manohara
Umpires: Rahat Ali (Sau) and Sanjay Gurung (Nep)
Player of the match: Basil Hameed (UAE)

- Oman won the toss and elected to field.
- No further play was possible due to rain.
- This was the first ODI match to be held at this venue.

=== 3rd place play-off ===
3rd place play-off
30 April 2023
09:00 UTC+5:45
Scorecard

Kuwait; 130 (31.3 overs)	v	Oman; 41/0 (6 overs)
Adnan Idrees 34 (48); Jay Odedra 5/14 (5.3 overs)		Jatinder Singh 26* (19)

No result
Tribhuvan University International Cricket Ground, Kirtipur
Umpires: Sanjay Gurung (Nep) and Shiju Sam (UAE)

- Oman won the toss and elected to field.
- No further play was possible due to rain.
- Oman were considered winners on the basis of seeding and qualified for the 2023 ACC Emerging Teams Asia Cup.

=== Final ===
Final
1–2 May 2023
09:00 UTC+5:45
Scorecard

United Arab Emirates; 117 (33.1 overs)	v	Nepal; 118/3 (30.3 overs)
Asif Khan 46 (54); Lalit Rajbanshi 4/14 (7.1 overs)		Gulsan Jha 67* (84); Rohan Mustafa 2/13 (10 overs)

Nepal won by 7 wickets
Tribhuvan University International Cricket Ground, Kirtipur
Umpires: Rahat Ali (Sau) and Vinod Babu (Oma)
Player of the match: Gulsan Jha (Nep)

- Nepal won the toss and elected to field.
- The match continued from United Arab Emirates' batting innings at 106/9 (27.3 overs) on the reserve day due to rain.

== See also ==
- International cricket in 2022–23
- Associate international cricket in 2022–23
- International cricket in 2023
- Associate international cricket in 2023
