= Saudi Arabia national cricket team =

Men's cricket team

Saudi Arabia
- Association: Saudi Arabian Cricket Federation

Personnel
- Captain: Waji Ul Hassan
- Coach: Saleem Jaffar

International Cricket Council
- ICC status: Associate member (2016); Affiliate member (2003)
- ICC region: Asia
ICC Rankings	Current	Best-ever
T20I	32nd	22nd (2 May 2019)

T20 Internationals
- First T20I: v Bahrain at Al Emarat Cricket Stadium, Muscat; 20 January 2019
- Last T20I: v Maldives at UKM-YSD Cricket Oval, Bangi; 14 October 2026
T20Is	Played	Won/Lost
Total	71	40/30 (1 tie, 0 no results)
This year	5	5/0 (0 ties, 0 no results)
T20I kit
- As of 12 October 2026

The Saudi Arabia national cricket team represents Saudi Arabia in international cricket. The team is organized by the Saudi Arabian Cricket Federation, which became an affiliate member of the International Cricket Council (ICC) in 2003 and an associate member in 2016.

Saudi Arabia made its international debut at the 2004 ACC Trophy in Malaysia, and has since played regularly in Asian Cricket Council (ACC) tournaments. After finishing second in the 2014 ACC Elite League, the team qualified for the World Cricket League for the first time. Saudi Arabia was due to compete in the 2015 Division Six event, but members of the team were denied visas by the host country, forcing the team to withdraw.

== History ==
The international debut of the Saudi senior team came in the ACC Trophy in 2004, where they failed to progress beyond the first round. They again failed to go past the first round in 2006, but had the remarkable achievement of scoring 499 runs in 50 overs against Brunei. Earlier in the year they came fourth in the Middle East Cup.

Arguably their greatest moment in international cricket to date came in the 2008 ACC Trophy Elite when they defeated the UAE by 29 runs, a team which has had previous One Day International experience.

With the separation of the ACC Trophy into Elite and Challenge divisions, following their performance at the 2006 ACC Trophy Saudi Arabia they competed in the Elite division in the 2008 competition, in which they came 10th. This result relegated them to the 2009 ACC Trophy Challenge, in which they did not appear. They did, however, appear in the 2010 competition, in which they came 2nd and gained promotion back to the Elite division.

Besides the 50 over format, Saudi Arabia have also played in the Twenty20 format of the game in the 2007 ACC Twenty20 Cup, in which they failed to progress beyond the group stage, and the 2009 ACC Twenty20 Cup, in which they came 8th.

=== 2018–present ===
In April 2018, the ICC decided to grant full Twenty20 International (T20I) status to all its members. Therefore, all Twenty20 matches played between Saudi Arabia and other ICC members after 1 January 2019 are a full T20I.

Saudi Arabia made its Twenty20 International debut on 20 January 2019, losing to Bahrain by 41 runs in the 2019 ACC Western Region T20 at Al Emarat Cricket Stadium, Muscat, Oman.

20 January 2019
09:30
Scorecard

Bahrain; 176/4 (20 overs)	v	Saudi Arabia; 135/9 (20 overs)
Imran Ali 58 (53); Usman Ali 1/24 (4 overs)		Muhammad Naeem 42 (36); Babar Ali 2/18 (3 overs)

Bahrain won by 41 runs
Al Amerat Cricket Stadium, Muscat
Umpires: Afzalkhan Pathan (Oma) and Zahid Usman (Kuw)
Player of the match: Sarfaraz Ali (Bhr)

- Saudi Arabia won the toss and elected to field.
- First ever T20I match for Saudi Arabia.

Saudi Arabia won the 2023 ACC Men's Challenger Cup in Thailand, finishing undefeated to qualify for the 2023 ACC Men's Premier Cup in Nepal. The team defeated Bahrain in the tournament final by 10 wickets, after bowling Bahrain out for just 26 runs.

== Tournament history ==
Legend

- Champions
- Runners-up
- Third place/Semi-finals
- Hosts
- Q Qualified/Advanced to next stage
- DNQ Did not qualify
- ▲ Promoted
- Remained in the same division
- ▼ Relegated

=== Men's T20 World Cup ===
Men's T20 World Cup record								Qualification record				
Year	Round	Position	Pld	W	L	T	NR	Pld	W	L	T	NR
(South Africa) 2007	Not eligible; no ODI status							Not eligible; no ODI status				
(England) 2009	Not eligible; no ODI status							Not eligible; no ODI status				
(Cricket West Indies) 2010	Not eligible; no ODI status							Not eligible; no ODI status				
(Sri Lanka) 2012	Did not qualify							5	0	5	0	0
(Bangladesh) 2014	Did not enter							Did not enter				
(India) 2016	Did not qualify							5	3	2	0	0
(United Arab Emirates) (Oman) 2021	Did not qualify							6	3	3	0	0
(Australia) 2022	Did not qualify							4	2	2	0	0
(United States) (Cricket West Indies) 2024	Did not qualify							6	5	1	0	0
(India) (Sri Lanka) 2026	Did not qualify							6	3	3	0	0
(Australia) (New Zealand) 2028	To be determined							5*	5	0	0	0
Total	—N/a	0/10	–	–	–	–	–	37	21	16	0	0

=== T20 World Cup Asia Regional Final ===
T20WC Asia Regional Final (Note: For the 2024 and 2026 Men's T20 World Cups, the final round of qualification in Asia was the ICC Asia Regional Final.) record
Year	Round	Position	Pld	W	L	T	NR	Qual.
(Singapore) 2019	Did not qualify							
(Nepal) 2023	Did not qualify							
(Oman) 2025	Did not qualify							
(To be determined) 2027	Qualified							
Total	0 Titles	1/4	–	–	–	–	–	—N/a

=== Other international tournaments ===
CWC Challenge League Play-off (List A)	World Cricket League (LA/ODI/50 overs)
2024: 7th place (DNQ)	2015 (Division Six): Withdrew (▼)

=== Other regional tournaments ===
T20WC Asia Sub-regional Qualifiers (T20I)	ACC Premier Cup (OD/T20I)	ACC Challenger Cup (OD/T20I)	ACC Twenty20 Cup (T20)
2018: 4th place (DNQ); 2021: 4th place (DNQ); 2023: Runners-up (DNQ); 2024: 4th place (DNQ); 2026: Winners (Q)	2023: 8th place (DNQ); 2024: 7th place (DNQ); 2026: 8th place (DNQ)	2023: Winners (Q); 2024: Winners (Q)	2007: 8th place; 2009: 8th place; 2011: 10th place; 2015: 3rd place
ACC Trophy (OD)	ACC Western Region T20 (T20)	Gulf T20I Championship (T20I)	
2004: Group stage; 2006: Group stage; 2008 (Elite): 10th place; 2010 (Challenge): Runners-up; 2012 (Elite): 9th place	2019: Winners; 2020: 6th place	2023: 6th place; 2024: 3rd place	

== Coaching history ==
- 2021–present: (Pakistan) Kabir Khan

== Current squad ==
This lists all players who played for Saudi Arabia in the past 12 months or were in the most recent One-day or T20I squads. Uncapped players are listed in italics.

Name	Age	Batting style	Bowling style	Formats	Notes
Batters
Abdul Waheed	32	Right-handed	Right-arm leg break	One-day & T20I	Vice-captain
Waqar ul Hassan	34	Left-handed	Right-arm medium	One-day	
Faisal Khan	30	Right-handed	Right-arm leg break	One-day & T20I	
Saad Khan	39	Left-handed	Right-arm medium	T20I	
Kashif Siddique	37	Left-handed		One-day	
Zuhair Muhammad	21	Right-handed	Right-arm off break	One-day & T20I	
All-rounders
Hisham Shaikh	30	Right-handed	Right-arm leg break	One-day & T20I	Captain
Waji ul Hassan	31	Right-handed	Right-arm medium	One-day & T20I	
Usman Khalid	42	Left-handed	Slow left-arm orthodox	One-day & T20I	
Tisara Perera	37	Left-handed	Right-arm medium	T20I	
Wicketkeepers
Manan Ali	29	Right-handed		One-day & T20I	
Haseeb Ghafoor	42	Right-handed		One-day & T20I	
Spin Bowlers
Zain ul Abidin	34	Left-handed	Slow left-arm orthodox	One-day & T20I	
Imran Yousuf	38	Right-handed	Right-arm leg break	One-day	
Usman Ali	39	Left-handed	Slow left-arm orthodox	T20I	
Pace Bowlers
Ishtiaq Ahmad	33	Right-handed	Right-arm medium	One-day & T20I	
Atif ur Rehman	44	Right-handed	Right-arm medium	One-day & T20I	
Usman Najeeb	31	Right-handed	Right-arm medium	One-day & T20I	
Shahzaib	33	Right-handed	Right-arm medium	One-day	
Ahmad Raza	22	Right-handed	Right-arm medium	T20I	

Updated as of 14 April 2024

== Records ==
International Match Summary — Saudi Arabia

Last updated 14 October 2026

Playing Record
Format	M	W	L	T	NR	Inaugural Match
Twenty20 Internationals	71	40	30	1	0	20 January 2019

=== Twenty20 International ===
- Highest team total: 221/3 v. Bhutan on 15 February 2024 at Terdthai Cricket Ground, Bangkok.
- Highest individual score: 115*, Waji Ul Hassan v. Bhutan on 15 February 2024 at Terdthai Cricket Ground, Bangkok.
- Best individual bowling figures: 5/6, Zain Ul Abidin v. Bhutan on 15 February 2024 at Terdthai Cricket Ground, Bangkok.

Most T20I runs for Saudi Arabia

Player	Runs	Average	Career span
Abdul Waheed	1,833	34.58	2020–2026
Faisal Khan	1,794	29.90	2019–2026
Manan Ali	873	21.82	2023–2026
Waji Ul Hassan	744	24.80	2024–2026
Hisham Shaikh	561	22.44	2021–2026

Most T20I wickets for Saudi Arabia

Player	Wickets	Average	Career span
Ishtiaq Ahmad	76	16.61	2021–2026
Zain Ul Abidin	59	18.40	2021–2026
Usman Najeeb	57	19.78	2022–2026
Hisham Shaikh	39	22.84	2021–2026
Usman Khalid	32	18.90	2021–2026

T20I record versus other nations

Records complete to T20I #4201. Last updated 14 October 2026.

Opponent	M	W	L	T	NR	First match	First win
vs Associate Members
Bahrain	8	2	6	0	0	20 January 2019	20 November 2022
Bhutan	3	3	0	0	0	3 February 2024	3 February 2024
Cambodia	3	3	0	0	0	1 February 2024	1 February 2024
Canada	2	0	2	0	0	15 November 2022	
China	1	1	0	0	0	12 October 2026	
Hong Kong	2	2	0	0	0	14 April 2024	14 April 2024
Indonesia	1	1	0	0	0	5 February 2024	5 February 2024
Iran	1	1	0	0	0	24 February 2019	24 February 2019
Japan	1	1	0	0	0	9 February 2024	9 February 2024
Kuwait	7	3	4	0	0	24 January 2019	24 January 2019
Malaysia	5	2	3	0	0	13 April 2024	30 April 2025
Maldives	6	6	0	0	0	22 January 2019	22 January 2019
Nepal	1	0	1	0	0	17 April 2024	
Oman	4	1	3	0	0	14 November 2022	18 December 2024
Qatar	14	5	8	1	0	21 January 2019	24 January 2019
Singapore	3	3	0	0	0	25 April 2025	25 April 2025
Thailand	5	5	0	0	0	13 February 2024	13 February 2024
United Arab Emirates	4	1	3	0	0	25 February 2020	19 December 2024

== See also ==
- List of Saudi Arabia Twenty20 International cricketers
- Saudi Arabia women's national cricket team
