= ACC Men's Premier Cup =

International associate cricket competition

- Tournament logo
- Administrator: Asian Cricket Council
- Format: Limited overs cricket One Day International; Twenty20 International
- First edition: 2023: Nepal
- Latest edition: 2026: Malaysia
- Next edition: 2028: TBA
- Tournament format: see below
- Number of teams: 10
- Current champion: Nepal (2nd title)
- Most successful: Nepal (2 titles)
- Most runs: (Saudi Arabia) Abdul Waheed (578)
- Most wickets: (United Arab Emirates) Aayan Afzal Khan (33)

The ACC Men's Premier Cup is a biennial international cricket competition in limited overs cricket format (an alternating format of 50-overs and 20-overs cricket), organised by the Asian Cricket Council (ACC) since its inauguration in 2023. The competition is played by the top associate members of the ACC advancing from the ACC Men's Challenger Cup to determine qualification for the Asia Cup, the Asia Cup Rising Stars (since 2025) and the ACC Emerging Teams Asia Cup (2023–2024).

As of 2026, three editions have been played; a total of eleven teams have played in the Premier Cup. Nine teams have competed in every tournament, and two have won the title. Nepal (2023, 2026) are the most successful team with two titles, while the United Arab Emirates (2024) have won the title once. Nepal are the current champions, having won the 2026 edition. The next edition of the tournament will take place in 2028.

== History ==
In January 2023, the ACC released the 2023–2024 calendar of events, which included a "Premier Cup" and a "Challenger Cup" tournaments as part of the associate teams' qualification pathway for the Asia Cup and the ACC Emerging Teams Asia Cup. Associate nations interested in hosting the event submit their "Expression of Interest" bid to the ACC, from which the final hosts for each tournament are selected.

The inaugural tournament in 50-over format was held in Nepal in April–May 2023. The second tournament in 20-over format was held in Oman in April 2024. In October 2025, the ACC announced that the Emerging Teams Asia Cup would be discontinued and be replaced by the Asia Cup Rising Stars. The third tournament in 50-over format was held in Malaysia in August–September 2026.

Host countries of Men's Premier Cup in Asia continent

== Format ==
=== Qualification process ===
For the first two tournaments, top 8 associate teams based on the ICC T20I rankings directly qualified for the Premier Cup, while the next ranked teams (8 in 2023; 10 in 2024) qualified for the Challenger Cup. Since 2026, top 8 teams from the previous Premier Cup directly qualify for the Premier Cup, while other teams play in the Challenger Cup. Top 2 teams from the Challenger Cup advance to the respective Premier Cup. Top teams (1 in 2023 and since 2026; 3 in 2024) from each Premier Cup qualify for the respective Asia Cup. Top 3 teams from each Premier Cup also qualified for the Emerging Teams Asia Cup until 2024, and qualify for the Asia Cup Rising Stars since 2025. (Note: References for qualification formats: 2023, 2024, 2026)

Summary of the qualification process (2023–2026)
#	Year	Qualified from (Note: Methods teams qualified for the Premier Cup)	Qualified to (Note: Tournaments teams qualified from the Premier Cup)
1	2023	ICC T20I rankings 2023 Challenger Cup	2023 Asia Cup; 2023 ACC Emerging Teams Asia Cup
2	2024	ICC T20I rankings 2024 Challenger Cup	2025 Asia Cup; 2024 ACC Emerging Teams Asia Cup; 2025 Asia Cup Rising Stars
3	2026	2024 Premier Cup; 2026 Challenger Cup	2027 Asia Cup; 2027 Asia Cup Rising Stars

=== Tournament ===
The Premier Cup has two stages. The preliminary stage, or group stage, featured 2 groups of 5 teams in a round-robin format. The second round is played as a knockout stage of four teams. (Note: References for tournament formats: 2023, 2024, 2026) In case of a tie (that is, both teams scoring the same number of runs at the end of their respective innings), a Super Over is used to decide the winner. In the case of a tie occurring again in the Super Over, subsequent Super Overs would be played until there is a winner.

The Premier Cup is played in an alternating format of 50-overs and 20-overs cricket. The Asia Cup and its qualification events taking place ahead of the ICC Men's Cricket World Cup are played in a 50-overs format, while tournaments taking place ahead of the ICC Men's T20 World Cup are played in a 20-overs format. In 50-overs tournaments, only the matches involving associate teams with ODI status are played as One Day International (ODI) matches with other mathces played as limited overs cricket (LOC) matches without international status while, tournaments in 20-overs format are played as complete Twenty20 International (T20I) tournaments.

Summary of tournament formats (2023–2026)
#	Year	Format	Teams	Matches	Preliminary stage	Final stage
1	2023	ODI & LOC	10	24	2 groups of 5 teams: 20 matches	Knockout of 4 teams: 4 matches
2	2024	T20I	10	24	2 groups of 5 teams: 20 matches	Knockout of 4 teams: 4 matches
3	2026	ODI & LOC	10	24	2 groups of 5 teams: 20 matches	Knockout of 4 teams: 4 matches

== Summary ==
Details of Men's Premier Cup tournaments
#	Year	Dates	Host(s)	Venues	Ref.
1	2023	18 April – 2 May 2023	Cricket Association of Nepal	2 in Nepal	
2	2024	12 – 21 April 2024	Oman Cricket	2 in Oman	
3	2026	30 August – 12 September 2026	Malaysian Cricket Association	2 in Malaysia	

=== Final results ===
Details of Men's Premier Cup finals
Year	Final				Ref.
Year	Date & venue	Winner	Victory margin	Runner-up	Ref.
2023	2 May 2023; Tribhuvan University International Cricket Ground, Kirtipur	Nepal; 118/3 (30.3 overs)	7 wickets	United Arab Emirates; 117 (33.1 overs)	
2024	21 April 2024; Oman Cricket Academy Ground Turf 1, Al Amarat	United Arab Emirates; 204/4 (20 overs)	55 runs	Oman; 149/9 (20 overs)	
2026	12 September 2026; Bayuemas Oval, Kuala Lumpur	Nepal; 313/9 (50 overs)	44 runs	United Arab Emirates; 269 (49.1 overs)	

== Team performances ==
As of the 2026 tournament, eleven teams have played in the Premier Cup. Nine teams have competed in every tournament, two of which have won the title. Nepal (2023, 2026) are the most successful team with two titles while the United Arab Emirates (2024) have won the title once. The United Arab Emirates have made three final and semi-final appearances, while Hong Kong, Nepal and Oman have each made two semi-final appearances. The best performance by a host team is winners by Nepal in 2023. Nepal also has the highest victory percentage in Premier Cup matches (81.25%).

=== By tournament ===
An overview of the teams' performances in every Premier Cup is given below.

Legend

- W Winners
- RU Runners-up
- 3rd 3rd place
- 4th 4th place
- R1 Preliminary round (group stage)
- Q Qualified
- × Withdrew
- ×× Ineligible (suspended)
- * Hosts
- ↑ Advanced to the respective Asia Cup
- → Advanced to the respective ACC Emerging Teams Asia Cup (2023–2024) and/or Asia Cup Rising Stars (since 2025)

Team performances in each Men's Premier Cup tournament
Edition (No. of teams)	2023 (10)	2024 (10)	2026 (10)	Apps
Location(s) Format Team	(Nepal) 50 ov.	(Oman) 20 ov.	(Malaysia) 50 ov.	Apps
Bahrain	R1	R1	R1	3
Cambodia	—N/a	R1	—N/a	1
Hong Kong	R1	3rd↑→	3rd→	3
Kuwait	4th	R1	R1	3
Malaysia	R1	R1	R1*	3
Nepal	W*↑→	4th	W↑→	3
Oman	3rd→	RU*↑→	4th	3
Qatar	R1	R1	R1	3
Saudi Arabia	R1	R1	R1	3
Singapore	R1	—N/a	R1	2
United Arab Emirates	RU→	W↑→	RU→	3
Ref.				

=== Overall ===
The table below provides a summary of the performances of teams over past Premier Cups.

Overall team performances in Women's Premier Cup tournaments
Team (Note: Teams are ordered by their best performance, then winning percentage, then (if equal) by alphabetical order.)	Apps	Mat	Won	Lost	Tied (W/L)	N/R	Win % (Note: Excluding no result matches)	Best performance
Nepal	3	17	13	3	0 (0/0)	1	81.25	Winners (2023, 2026)
United Arab Emirates	3	18	14	4	0 (0/0)	0	77.77	Winners (2024)
Oman	3	18	10	7	0 (0/0)	1	58.82	Runners-up (2024)
Hong Kong	3	15	8	6	1 (1/0)	0	60.00	Semi-finals (2024, 2026)
Kuwait	3	14	7	5	0 (0/0)	2	58.33	Semi-finals (2023)
Malaysia	3	12	5	6	1 (0/1)	0	41.66	First round (2023, 2024, 2026)
Qatar	3	12	4	8	0 (0/0)	0	33.33	First round (2023, 2024, 2026)
Bahrain	3	11	3	8	0 (0/0)	0	27.27	First round (2023, 2024, 2026)
Saudi Arabia	3	11	3	8	0 (0/0)	0	27.27	First round (2023, 2024, 2026)
Singapore	2	8	0	8	0 (0/0)	0	0.00	First round (2023, 2026)
Cambodia	1	4	0	4	0 (0/0)	0	0.00	First round (2024)
As of 2026 ACC Men's Premier Cup Source: Cricinfo

=== Debutant teams by tournament ===
Debutant teams in each Men's Premier Cup tournament
Year	Debutant teams					Total
2023	Bahrain	Hong Kong	Kuwait	Malaysia	Nepal	10
2023	Oman	Qatar	Saudi Arabia	Singapore	United Arab Emirates	10
2024	Cambodia					1
2026	—N/a					0
Total						11

== Records ==
As of the 2026 tournament, Aayan Afzal Khan of the United Arab Emirates holds the record for most appearances in Premier Cup matches (18), while Mohammed Aslam of Kuwait holds the record for the most Premier Cup matches as a captain (14). Oman Cricket Academy Ground Turf 1 in Al Amarat, Oman, has hosted the most Premier Cup matches (14). Emirati umpire Shiju Sam has umpired the most Premier Cup matches (16). A total of 14 centuries and twenty-five 100-run partnerships have been scored while, 11 five-wicket hauls and 38 four-wicket hauls have been taken in the tournaments. Abdul Waheed of Saudi Arabia holds the record for most runs (578), and Vriitya Aravind of the United Arab Emirates holds the record for most runs in a tournament (454 in 2023). Aayan Afzal Khan also holds the record for most wickets (33), and Bilal Khan of Oman (17 in 2023) and Sandeep Lamichhane of Nepal (17 in 2026) are tied for most wickets in a tournament. Zeeshan Ali of Hong Kong and Aasif Sheikh of Nepal are tied for most dismissals by a wicket-keeper (19) while Babar Hayat of Hong Kong and Dipendra Singh Airee of Nepal are tied for most catches by a fielder (12).

=== Overall records ===
Team records
Record for	Record holder	Record	Tournament(s)	Ref.
Highest team total	United Arab Emirates (v Singapore) at Kirtipur	471	2023	
Lowest team total	Oman (v Nepal) at Kuala Lumpur	60/10	2026	
Highest match aggregate	Singapore v United Arab Emirates at Kirtipur	741/19	2023	
Lowest match aggregate	Hong Kong v United Arab Emirates at Bangi	141/13	2026	

Batting records
Record for	Record holder	Record	Tournament(s)	Ref.
Most runs	(Saudi Arabia) Abdul Waheed	578	2023 – 2026	
Most runs in a tournament	(United Arab Emirates) Vriitya Aravind	454	2023	
Highest score	(United Arab Emirates) Vriitya Aravind (v Kuwait) at Kirtipur	185	2023	
Most centuries	3 players	2	2023 – 2026	
Highest partnership	(United Arab Emirates) Rohan Mustafa & Vriitya Aravind (v Kuwait) at Kirtipur	275	2023	

Bowling records
Record for	Record holder	Record	Tournament(s)	Ref.
Most wickets	(United Arab Emirates) Aayan Afzal Khan	33	2023 – 2026	
Most wickets in a tournament	(Oman) Bilal Khan (Nepal) Sandeep Lamichhane	17	2023 2026	
Best bowling figures	(United Arab Emirates) Haider Ali (v Hong Kong) at Bangi	6/14	2026	
Most four-wicket hauls	4 players	3	2023 – 2026	
Most five-wicket hauls	2 players	2	2023 – 2026	

Fielding records
Record for	Record holder	Record	Tournament(s)	Ref.
Most wicket-keeper dismissals	(Hong Kong) Zeeshan Ali (Nepal) Aasif Sheikh	19	2023 – 2026	
Most wicket-keeper dismissals in a tournament	(Kuwait) Usman Patel	13	2023	
Most catches	(Hong Kong) Babar Hayat (Nepal) Dipendra Singh Airee	12	2023 – 2026	
Most catches in a tournament	(United Arab Emirates) Muhammad Waseem	7	2024	

=== Tournament records ===
Records by tournament
Edition	Most runs	Most wickets	Ref.
2023	(United Arab Emirates) Vriitya Aravind (454)	(Oman) Bilal Khan (17)	
2024	(United Arab Emirates) Alishan Sharafu (278)	(Oman) Aqib Ilyas (12)	
2026	(Malaysia) Virandeep Singh (273)	(Nepal) Sandeep Lamichhane (17)	

== See also ==
- Women's Asia Cup – women's competition held since 2004
  - ACC Women's Premier Cup – equivalent women's competition held since 2024
- Asia Cup Rising Stars
- Under-19 Men's Asia Cup
- Women's Asia Cup Rising Stars
- Under-19 Women's T20 Asia Cup
