= ACC Men's Challenger Cup =

International associate cricket competition

- Administrator: Asian Cricket Council
- Format: Limited overs cricket Twenty20 International
- First edition: 2023: Thailand
- Latest edition: 2026: Singapore
- Next edition: 2028: TBA
- Tournament format: see below
- Number of teams: 10
- Current champion: Malaysia (1st title)
- Most successful: Saudi Arabia (2 titles)

The ACC Men's Challenger Cup is a biennial international cricket competition in limited overs cricket format (an alternating format of 50-overs and 20-overs cricket), organised by the Asian Cricket Council (ACC) since its inauguration in 2023. The competition is played by the associate members of the ACC, with the top teams advancing to the ACC Men's Premier Cup to determine qualification for the Asia Cup, the Asia Cup Rising Stars (since 2025) and the ACC Emerging Teams Asia Cup (2023–2024).

As of 2026, three editions have been played; a total of fourteen teams have played in the Challenger Cup. Five teams have competed in every tournament and two have won the title. Saudi Arabia (2023, 2024) are the most successful team with two titles while Malaysia (2026) have won the title once. Malaysia are the current champions, having won the 2026 edition. The next edition of the tournament will take place in 2028.

== History ==
In January 2023, the ACC released the 2023–2024 calendar of events, which included a "Premier Cup" and a "Challenger Cup" tournaments as part of the associate teams' qualification pathway for the Asia Cup and the ACC Emerging Teams Asia Cup. Associate nations interested in hosting the event submit their "Expression of Interest" bid to the ACC, from which the final hosts for each tournament are selected.

The inaugural tournament in 50-over format was held in Thailand in February–March 2023. The second tournament in 20-over format was also held in Thailand in January–February 2024. In October 2025, the ACC announced that the Emerging Teams Asia Cup would be discontinued and be replaced by the Asia Cup Rising Stars. The third tournament in 50-over format was held in Singapore in June 2026.

Host countries of Men's Challenger Cup in Southeast Asia

== Format ==
=== Qualification process ===
The top 8 associate teams on the ICC T20I rankings that are not already directly qualified for the Premier Cup, qualify for the Challenger Cup. The top 2 teams from the Challenger Cup advance to the respective Premier Cup. (Note: References for qualification formats: 2023, 2024, 2026)

=== Tournament ===
The Challenger Cup is played in two stages. The preliminary stage or group stage is played by 2 groups in 2023 and 2024; and 4 groups in 2026 in a round-robin format. The 2024 tournament also had a play-in qualifier stage to determine one final entrant to the group stage. The second round is played as a knockout stage of four teams in 2023 and 2024; and 8 teams in 2026. The 2024 tournament also included 3 consolation place playoffs. (Note: References for tournament formats: 2023, 2024, 2026) In case of a tie (that is, both teams scoring the same number of runs at the end of their respective innings), a Super Over is used to decide the winner. In the case of a tie occurring again in the Super Over, subsequent Super Overs would be played until there is a winner.

The Challenger Cup is played in an alternating format of 50-overs and 20-overs cricket. The Asia Cup and its qualification events taking place ahead of the ICC Men's Cricket World Cup are played in a 50-overs format while, tournaments taking place ahead of the ICC Men's T20 World Cup are played in a 20-overs format. In 50-overs tournaments, the matches played as limited overs cricket (LOC) matches without international status while, tournaments in 20-overs format are played as complete Twenty20 International (T20I) tournaments.

Summary of tournament formats (2023–2026)
#	Year	Format	Teams	Matches	Qualifier stage	Preliminary stage	Place playoffs	Final stage
1	2023	LOC	8	15	—N/a	2 groups of 4 teams: 12 matches	—N/a	Knockout of 4 teams: 3 matches
2	2024	T20I	10	22	Round-robin of 3 teams: 3 matches	2 groups of 4 teams: 12 matches	6th to 10th: 3 matches	Knockout of 4 teams: 4 matches
3	2026	LOC	10	16	—N/a	2 groups of 2 teams: 2 matches & 2 groups of 3 teams: 6 matches	—N/a	Knockout of 8 teams: 8 matches

== Summary ==
Details of Men's Challenger Cup tournaments
#	Year	Dates	Host(s)	Venues	Ref.
1	2023	24 February – 5 March 2023	Cricket Association of Thailand	2 in Thailand	
2	2024	27 January – 11 February 2024	Cricket Association of Thailand	1 in Thailand	
3	2026	10 – 20 June 2026	Singapore Cricket Association	2 in Singapore	

=== Final results ===
Details of Men's Challenger Cup finals
Year	Final				Ref.
Year	Date & venue	Winner	Victory margin	Runner-up	Ref.
2023	5 March 2023; Terdthai Cricket Ground, Bangkok	Saudi Arabia; 30/0 (4.1 overs)	10 wickets	Bahrain; 26 (21.1 overs)	
2024	11 February 2024; Terdthai Cricket Ground, Bangkok	Saudi Arabia; 151/5 (17.3 overs)	5 wickets	Cambodia; 147/5 (20 overs)	
2026	20 June 2026; Singapore National Cricket Ground, Singapore	Malaysia; 247/4 (19.2 overs)	6 wickets	Singapore; 243 (24 overs)	

== Team performances ==
As of the 2026 tournament, fourteen teams have played in the Challenger Cup. Five teams have competed in every tournament and two have won the title. Saudi Arabia (2023, 2024) are the most successful team with two titles while Malaysia (2026) have won the title once. Saudi Arabia have made two final appearances while, Saudi Arabia, Singapore and Thailand have each made two semi-final appearances. The best performance by a host team is runners-up by Singapore in 2026.

=== By tournament ===
An overview of the teams' performances in every Challenger Cup is given below.

Legend

- W Winners
- RU Runners-up
- SF Semi-finalist (2023)
- 3rd 3rd place (since 2024)
- 4th 4th place (since 2024)
- QF Quarter-finalist (since 2026)
- R1 Preliminary round (group stage)
- Q Qualified
- × Withdrew
- ×× Ineligible (suspended)
- * Hosts
- ↑ Advanced to the respective ACC Men's Premier Cup
- § Directly qualified for the respective ACC Men's Premier Cup

† denotes countries that are members of both the Asian Cricket Council and ICC East Asia-Pacific.

Team performances in each Men's Challenger Cup tournament
Edition (No. of teams)	2023 (8)	2024 (10)	2026 (10)	Apps
Location(s) Format Team	(Thailand) 50 ov.	(Thailand) 20 ov.	(Singapore) 50 ov.	Apps
Bahrain	RU↑	§	§	1
Bhutan	SF	R1	QF	3
Cambodia	—N/a	RU↑	R1	2
China	—N/a	R1	QF	2
Indonesia†	R1	R1	4th	3
Iran	R1	—N/a	—N/a	1
Japan†	—N/a	4th	—N/a	1
Malaysia	§	§	W↑	1
Maldives	R1	R1	QF	3
Myanmar	R1	R1	R1	3
Saudi Arabia	W↑	W↑	§	2
Singapore	§	3rd	RU*↑	2
Thailand	SF*	R1*	3rd	3
Uzbekistan	—N/a	—N/a	QF	1
Ref.				

=== Debutant teams by tournament ===
Debutant teams in each Men's Challenger Cup tournament
Year	Debutant teams				Total
2023	Bahrain	Bhutan	Indonesia†	Iran	8
2023	Maldives	Myanmar	Saudi Arabia	Thailand	8
2024	Cambodia	China	Japan†	Singapore	4
2026	Malaysia		Uzbekistan		2
Total					14

== Records ==
Records by tournament
Edition	Most runs	Most wickets	Ref.
2023	(Indonesia) Padmakar Surve (199)	(Saudi Arabia) Ishtiaq Ahmad (12) (Bahrain) Abdul Majid (12)	
2024	(Cambodia) Luqman Butt (245)	(Cambodia) Sharwan Godara (12) (Cambodia) Utkarsh Jain (12)	
2026	(Indonesia) Sudhakar Jegannathan (282)	(Maldives) Harsha Shanaka (14)	

== See also ==
- Women's Asia Cup – women's competition held since 2004
  - ACC Women's Premier Cup – similar women's competition held since 2024
- Asia Cup Rising Stars
- Under-19 Men's Asia Cup
- Women's Asia Cup Rising Stars
- Under-19 Women's T20 Asia Cup
