= International cricket in 2023 =

International cricket season

The 2023 international cricket season covered series starting between April 2023 to September 2023. The 2023 Cricket World Cup Qualifier was played in Zimbabwe in June and July. This calendar included men's Test, One Day International (ODI) and Twenty20 International (T20I) matches, women's Test, women's One Day Internationals (WODIs) and women's Twenty20 Internationals (WT20Is) matches, as well as some other significant series. In addition to the matches shown here, a number of other T20I/WT20I series involving associate nations were played during this period.

== Season overview ==
Men's International tours
Start date	Home team	Away team	Results [Matches]		
Start date	Home team	Away team	Test	ODI	T20I
9 May 2023	(England) Ireland	Bangladesh	—	0–2 [3]	—
1 June 2023	England	Ireland	1–0 [1]	1–0 [3]	—
2 June 2023	Sri Lanka	Afghanistan	—	2–1 [3]	—
4 June 2023	United Arab Emirates	West Indies	—	0–3 [3]	—
14 June 2023	Bangladesh	Afghanistan	1–0 [1]	1–2 [3]	2–0 [2]
16 June 2023	England	Australia	2–2 [5]	—	—
12 July 2023	(United States) West Indies	India	0–1 [2]	1–2 [3]	3–2 [5]
16 July 2023	Sri Lanka	Pakistan	0–2 [2]	—	—
17 August 2023	United Arab Emirates	New Zealand	—	—	1–2 [3]
18 August 2023	Ireland	India	—	—	0–2 [3]
22 August 2023	(Sri Lanka) Afghanistan	Pakistan	—	0–3 [3]	—
30 August 2023	South Africa	Australia	—	3–2 [5]	0–3 [3]
30 August 2023	England	New Zealand	—	3–1 [4]	2–2 [4]
Men's international tournaments
Start date	Tournament				Winners
7 June 2023	(England) ICC World Test Championship Final				Australia
18 June 2023	(Zimbabwe) 2023 Cricket World Cup Qualifier				Sri Lanka
30 August 2023	(Pakistan) (Sri Lanka) 2023 Asia Cup				India

Women's international tours
Start date	Home team	Away team	Results [Matches]		
Start date	Home team	Away team	Test	ODI	T20I
29 April 2023	Sri Lanka	Bangladesh	—	1–0 [3]	2–1 [3]
22 June 2023	England	Australia	0–1 [1]	2–1 [3]	2–1 [3]
26 June 2023	West Indies	Ireland	—	2–0 [3]	3–0 [3]
27 June 2023	Sri Lanka	New Zealand	—	2–1 [3]	1–2 [3]
3 July 2023	Netherlands	Thailand	—	1–1 [3]	—
9 July 2023	Bangladesh	India	—	1–1 [3]	1–2 [3]
23 July 2023	Ireland	Australia	—	0–2 [3]	—
14 August 2023	Netherlands	Ireland	—	—	0–3 [3]
31 August 2023	England	Sri Lanka	—	2–0 [3]	1–2 [3]
1 September 2023	Pakistan	South Africa	—	1–2 [3]	3–0 [3]

== April ==
=== Bangladesh women in Sri Lanka ===
2022–2025 ICC Women's Championship – WODI series
No.	Date	Home captain	Away captain	Venue	Result
WODI 1315	29 April	Chamari Athapaththu	Nigar Sultana	P. Sara Oval, Colombo	No result
WODI 1315a	2 May	Chamari Athapaththu	Nigar Sultana	P. Sara Oval, Colombo	Match abandoned
WODI 1316	4 May	Chamari Athapaththu	Nigar Sultana	Singhalese Sports Club Cricket Ground, Colombo	Sri Lanka won by 58 runs
WT20I series
No.	Date	Home captain	Away captain	Venue	Result
WT20I 1437	9 May	Chamari Athapaththu	Nigar Sultana	Singhalese Sports Club Cricket Ground, Colombo	Bangladesh by 6 wickets
WT20I 1439	11 May	Chamari Athapaththu	Nigar Sultana	Singhalese Sports Club Cricket Ground, Colombo	Sri Lanka by 7 wickets
WT20I 1441	12 May	Chamari Athapaththu	Nigar Sultana	Singhalese Sports Club Cricket Ground, Colombo	Sri Lanka won by 44 runs

== May ==
=== Ireland vs Bangladesh in England ===
2020–2023 ICC Cricket World Cup Super League – ODI series
No.	Date	Home captain	Away captain	Venue	Result
ODI 4576	9 May	Andrew Balbirnie	Tamim Iqbal	County Cricket Ground, Chelmsford	No result
ODI 4577	12 May	Andrew Balbirnie	Tamim Iqbal	County Cricket Ground, Chelmsford	Bangladesh by 3 wickets
ODI 4578	14 May	Andrew Balbirnie	Tamim Iqbal	County Cricket Ground, Chelmsford	Bangladesh by 4 runs

== June ==
=== Ireland in England ===
Only Test
No.	Date	Home captain	Away captain	Venue	Result
Test 2504	1–4 June	Ben Stokes	Andrew Balbirnie	Lord's, London	England by 10 wickets
ODI series
No.	Date	Home captain	Away captain	Venue	Result
ODI 4649a	20 September	Zak Crawley	Paul Stirling	Headingley, Leeds	Match abandoned
ODI 4653	23 September	Zak Crawley	Paul Stirling	Trent Bridge, Nottingham	England by 48 runs
ODI 4656	26 September	Zak Crawley	Paul Stirling	County Ground, Bristol	No result

=== Afghanistan in Sri Lanka ===
ODI series
No.	Date	Home captain	Away captain	Venue	Result
ODI 4579	2 June	Dasun Shanaka	Hashmatullah Shahidi	Mahinda Rajapaksa International Cricket Stadium, Hambantota	Afghanistan by 6 wickets
ODI 4580	4 June	Dasun Shanaka	Hashmatullah Shahidi	Mahinda Rajapaksa International Cricket Stadium, Hambantota	Sri Lanka by 132 runs
ODI 4583	7 June	Dasun Shanaka	Hashmatullah Shahidi	Mahinda Rajapaksa International Cricket Stadium, Hambantota	Sri Lanka by 9 wickets

=== West Indies in the UAE ===
ODI series
No.	Date	Home captain	Away captain	Venue	Result
ODI 4581	4 June	Muhammad Waseem	Shai Hope	Sharjah Cricket Stadium, Sharjah	West Indies by 7 wickets
ODI 4582	6 June	Muhammad Waseem	Shai Hope	Sharjah Cricket Stadium, Sharjah	West Indies by 78 runs
ODI 4584	9 June	Muhammad Waseem	Roston Chase	Sharjah Cricket Stadium, Sharjah	West Indies by 4 wickets

=== World Test Championship Final ===
Only Test
No.	Date	Team 1	Captain 1	Team 2	Captain 2	Venue	Result
Test 2505	7–11 June	Australia	Pat Cummins	India	Rohit Sharma	The Oval, London	Australia by 209 runs

=== Afghanistan in Bangladesh ===
Only Test
No.	Date	Home captain	Away captain	Venue	Result
Test 2506	14–18 June	Litton Das	Hashmatullah Shahidi	Sher-e-Bangla National Cricket Stadium, Dhaka	Bangladesh by 546 runs
ODI series
No.	Date	Home captain	Away captain	Venue	Result
ODI 4615	5 July	Tamim Iqbal	Hashmatullah Shahidi	Zohur Ahmed Chowdhury Stadium, Chittagong	Afghanistan by 17 runs (DLS)
ODI 4619	8 July	Litton Das	Hashmatullah Shahidi	Zohur Ahmed Chowdhury Stadium, Chittagong	Afghanistan by 142 runs
ODI 4621	11 July	Litton Das	Hashmatullah Shahidi	Zohur Ahmed Chowdhury Stadium, Chittagong	Bangladesh by 7 wickets
T20I series
No.	Date	Home captain	Away captain	Venue	Result
T20I 2138	14 July	Shakib Al Hasan	Rashid Khan	Sylhet International Cricket Stadium, Sylhet	Bangladesh by 2 wickets
T20I 2145	16 July	Shakib Al Hasan	Rashid Khan	Sylhet International Cricket Stadium, Sylhet	Bangladesh by 6 wickets (DLS)

=== Australia in England ===
2023–2025 ICC World Test Championship, The Ashes – Test series
No.	Date	Home captain	Away captain	Venue	Result
Test 2507	16–20 June	Ben Stokes	Pat Cummins	Edgbaston, Birmingham	Australia by 2 wickets
Test 2508	28 June–2 July	Ben Stokes	Pat Cummins	Lord's, London	Australia by 43 runs
Test 2509	6–10 July	Ben Stokes	Pat Cummins	Headingley, Leeds	England by 3 wickets
Test 2512	19–23 July	Ben Stokes	Pat Cummins	Old Trafford, Manchester	Match drawn
Test 2515	27–31 July	Ben Stokes	Pat Cummins	The Oval, London	England by 49 runs

=== 2023 Cricket World Cup Qualifier ===
Pos	Team	Pld	W	L	NR	Pts	NRR	Qualification
1	Zimbabwe	4	4	0	0	8	2.241	Advanced to the Super Six
2	Netherlands	4	3	1	0	6	0.667	Advanced to the Super Six
3	West Indies	4	2	2	0	4	0.525	Advanced to the Super Six
4	Nepal	4	1	3	0	2	−1.176	Advanced to the 7th–10th Play-offs
5	United States	4	0	4	0	0	−2.169	Advanced to the 7th–10th Play-offs

Source: ESPNcricinfo

Pos	Team	Pld	W	L	NR	Pts	NRR	Qualification
1	Sri Lanka	4	4	0	0	8	3.047	Advanced to the Super Six
2	Scotland	4	3	1	0	6	0.540	Advanced to the Super Six
3	Oman	4	2	2	0	4	−1.221	Advanced to the Super Six
4	Ireland	4	1	3	0	2	−0.061	Advanced to the 7th–10th Play-offs
5	United Arab Emirates	4	0	4	0	0	−2.249	Advanced to the 7th–10th Play-offs

Source: ESPNcricinfo

Group stage
No.	Date	Team 1	Captain 1	Team 2	Captain 2	Venue	Result
ODI 4585	18 June	Zimbabwe	Craig Ervine	Nepal	Rohit Paudel	Harare Sports Club, Harare	Zimbabwe by 8 wickets
ODI 4586	18 June	United States	Monank Patel	West Indies	Shai Hope	Takashinga Cricket Club, Harare	West Indies by 39 runs
ODI 4587	19 June	Sri Lanka	Dasun Shanaka	United Arab Emirates	Muhammad Waseem	Queens Sports Club, Bulawayo	Sri Lanka by 175 runs
ODI 4588	19 June	Ireland	Andrew Balbirnie	Oman	Zeeshan Maqsood	Bulawayo Athletic Club, Bulawayo	Oman by 5 wickets
ODI 4589	20 June	Zimbabwe	Craig Ervine	Netherlands	Scott Edwards	Harare Sports Club, Harare	Zimbabwe by 6 wickets
ODI 4590	20 June	Nepal	Rohit Paudel	United States	Aaron Jones	Takashinga Cricket Club, Harare	Nepal by 6 wickets
ODI 4591	21 June	Ireland	Andrew Balbirnie	Scotland	Richie Berrington	Queens Sports Club, Bulawayo	Scotland by 1 wicket
ODI 4592	21 June	Oman	Zeeshan Maqsood	United Arab Emirates	Muhammad Waseem	Bulawayo Athletic Club, Bulawayo	Oman by 5 wickets
ODI 4593	22 June	Nepal	Rohit Paudel	West Indies	Shai Hope	Harare Sports Club, Harare	West Indies by 101 runs
ODI 4594	22 June	Netherlands	Scott Edwards	United States	Aaron Jones	Takashinga Cricket Club, Harare	Netherlands by 5 wickets
ODI 4595	23 June	Oman	Zeeshan Maqsood	Sri Lanka	Dasun Shanaka	Queens Sports Club, Bulawayo	Sri Lanka by 10 wickets
ODI 4596	23 June	Scotland	Richie Berrington	United Arab Emirates	Muhammad Waseem	Bulawayo Athletic Club, Bulawayo	Scotland by 111 runs
ODI 4597	24 June	Zimbabwe	Craig Ervine	West Indies	Shai Hope	Harare Sports Club, Harare	Zimbabwe by 35 runs
ODI 4598	24 June	Nepal	Rohit Paudel	Netherlands	Scott Edwards	Takashinga Cricket Club, Harare	Netherlands by 7 wickets
ODI 4599	25 June	Ireland	Andrew Balbirnie	Sri Lanka	Dasun Shanaka	Queens Sports Club, Bulawayo	Sri Lanka by 133 runs
ODI 4600	25 June	Oman	Zeeshan Maqsood	Scotland	Richie Berrington	Bulawayo Athletic Club, Bulawayo	Scotland by 76 runs
ODI 4601	26 June	Zimbabwe	Sean Williams	United States	Monank Patel	Harare Sports Club, Harare	Zimbabwe by 304 runs
ODI 4602	26 June	Netherlands	Scott Edwards	West Indies	Shai Hope	Takashinga Cricket Club, Harare	Match tied (Netherlands won S/O)
ODI 4603	27 June	Scotland	Richie Berrington	Sri Lanka	Dasun Shanaka	Queens Sports Club, Bulawayo	Sri Lanka by 82 runs
ODI 4604	27 June	Ireland	Andrew Balbirnie	United Arab Emirates	Muhammad Waseem	Bulawayo Athletic Club, Bulawayo	Ireland by 138 runs

==== Play-offs ====
Play-offs
No.	Date	Team 1	Captain 1	Team 2	Captain 2	Venue	Result
ODI 4607	30 June	Ireland	Andrew Balbirnie	United States	Monank Patel	Takashinga Cricket Club, Harare	Ireland by 6 wickets
ODI 4610	2 July	Nepal	Rohit Paudel	United Arab Emirates	Vriitya Aravind	Takashinga Cricket Club, Harare	Nepal by 3 wickets
ODI 4613	4 July	Ireland	Andrew Balbirnie	Nepal	Rohit Paudel	Takashinga Cricket Club, Harare	Ireland by 2 wickets
ODI 4617	6 July	United Arab Emirates	Vriitya Aravind	United States	Monank Patel	Takashinga Cricket Club, Harare	United Arab Emirates by 1 run

==== Super Six and final ====
Pos	Team	Pld	W	L	NR	Pts	NRR	
1	Sri Lanka	5	5	0	0	10	1.600	Advanced to the Final and qualified for the 2023 Cricket World Cup
2	Netherlands	5	3	2	0	6	0.160	Advanced to the Final and qualified for the 2023 Cricket World Cup
3	Scotland	5	3	2	0	6	0.102	
4	Zimbabwe (H)	5	3	2	0	6	−0.099	
5	West Indies	5	1	4	0	2	−0.204	
6	Oman	5	0	5	0	0	−1.895	

Source: ICC
(H) Host

Super Six
No.	Date	Team 1	Captain 1	Team 2	Captain 2	Venue	Result
ODI 4605	29 June	Zimbabwe	Craig Ervine	Oman	Zeeshan Maqsood	Queens Sports Club, Bulawayo	Zimbabwe by 14 runs
ODI 4606	30 June	Netherlands	Scott Edwards	Sri Lanka	Dasun Shanaka	Queens Sports Club, Bulawayo	Sri Lanka by 21 runs
ODI 4608	1 July	Scotland	Richie Berrington	West Indies	Shai Hope	Harare Sports Club, Harare	Scotland by 7 wickets
ODI 4609	2 July	Zimbabwe	Craig Ervine	Sri Lanka	Dasun Shanaka	Queens Sports Club, Bulawayo	Sri Lanka by 9 wickets
ODI 4611	3 July	Netherlands	Scott Edwards	Oman	Aqib Ilyas	Harare Sports Club, Harare	Netherlands by 74 runs (DLS)
ODI 4612	4 July	Zimbabwe	Craig Ervine	Scotland	Richie Berrington	Queens Sports Club, Bulawayo	Scotland by 31 runs
ODI 4614	5 July	Oman	Aqib Ilyas	West Indies	Shai Hope	Harare Sports Club, Harare	West Indies by 7 wickets
ODI 4616	6 July	Scotland	Richie Berrington	Netherlands	Scott Edwards	Queens Sports Club, Bulawayo	Netherlands by 4 wickets
ODI 4618	7 July	Sri Lanka	Dasun Shanaka	West Indies	Shai Hope	Harare Sports Club, Harare	Sri Lanka by 8 wickets
Final
ODI 4620	9 July	Netherlands	Scott Edwards	Sri Lanka	Dasun Shanaka	Harare Sports Club, Harare	Sri Lanka by 128 runs

=== Australia women in England ===
Only WTest
No.	Date	Home captain	Away captain	Venue	Result
WTest 145	22–26 June	Heather Knight	Alyssa Healy	Trent Bridge, Nottingham	Australia by 89 runs
WT20I series
No.	Date	Home captain	Away captain	Venue	Result
WT20I 1503	1 July	Heather Knight	Alyssa Healy	Edgbaston, Birmingham	Australia by 4 wickets
WT20I 1504	5 July	Heather Knight	Alyssa Healy	The Oval, London	England by 3 runs
WT20I 1508	8 July	Heather Knight	Alyssa Healy	Lord's, London	England by 5 wickets (DLS)
2022–2025 ICC Women's Championship – WODI series
No.	Date	Home captain	Away captain	Venue	Result
WODI 1325	12 July	Heather Knight	Alyssa Healy	County Ground, Bristol	England by 2 wickets
WODI 1327	16 July	Heather Knight	Alyssa Healy	Rose Bowl, Southampton	Australia by 3 runs
WODI 1328	18 July	Heather Knight	Alyssa Healy	County Ground, Taunton	England by 69 runs (DLS)

=== Ireland women in the West Indies ===
2022–2025 ICC Women's Championship – WODI series
No.	Date	Home captain	Away captain	Venue	Result
WODI 1317	26 June	Hayley Matthews	Laura Delany	Daren Sammy Cricket Ground, Gros Islet	West Indies by 58 runs
WODI 1319	28 June	Hayley Matthews	Laura Delany	Daren Sammy Cricket Ground, Gros Islet	No result
WODI 1321	1 July	Hayley Matthews	Laura Delany	Daren Sammy Cricket Ground, Gros Islet	West Indies by 6 wickets
WT20I series
No.	Date	Home captain	Away captain	Venue	Result
WT20I 1505	4 July	Hayley Matthews	Laura Delany	Daren Sammy Cricket Ground, Gros Islet	West Indies by 2 wickets
WT20I 1506	6 July	Hayley Matthews	Laura Delany	Daren Sammy Cricket Ground, Gros Islet	West Indies by 8 wickets
WT20I 1509	8 July	Hayley Matthews	Laura Delany	Daren Sammy Cricket Ground, Gros Islet	West Indies by 8 wickets

=== New Zealand women in Sri Lanka ===
2022–2025 ICC Women's Championship – WODI series
No.	Date	Home captain	Away captain	Venue	Result
WODI 1318	27 June	Chamari Athapaththu	Sophie Devine	Galle International Stadium, Galle	Sri Lanka by 9 wickets (DLS)
WODI 1320	30 June	Chamari Athapaththu	Sophie Devine	Galle International Stadium, Galle	New Zealand by 111 runs
WODI 1322	3 July	Chamari Athapaththu	Sophie Devine	Galle International Stadium, Galle	Sri Lanka by 8 wickets (DLS)
WT20I series
No.	Date	Home captain	Away captain	Venue	Result
WT20I 1507	8 July	Chamari Athapaththu	Sophie Devine	P. Sara Oval, Colombo	New Zealand by 5 wickets
WT20I 1511	10 July	Chamari Athapaththu	Sophie Devine	P. Sara Oval, Colombo	New Zealand by 8 wickets
WT20I 1515	12 July	Chamari Athapaththu	Sophie Devine	P. Sara Oval, Colombo	Sri Lanka by 10 wickets

== July ==
=== Thailand women in the Netherlands ===
WODI series
No.	Date	Home captain	Away captain	Venue	Result
WODI 1323	3 July	Heather Siegers	Naruemol Chaiwai	VRA Cricket Ground, Amstelveen	Netherlands by 57 runs
WODI 1323a	5 July	Heather Siegers	Naruemol Chaiwai	VRA Cricket Ground, Amstelveen	Match abandoned
WODI 1324	7 July	Heather Siegers	Naruemol Chaiwai	VRA Cricket Ground, Amstelveen	Thailand by 124 runs

=== India women in Bangladesh ===
WT20I series
No.	Date	Home captain	Away captain	Venue	Result
WT20I 1510	9 July	Nigar Sultana	Harmanpreet Kaur	Sher-e-Bangla National Cricket Stadium, Dhaka	India by 7 wickets
WT20I 1513	11 July	Nigar Sultana	Harmanpreet Kaur	Sher-e-Bangla National Cricket Stadium, Dhaka	India by 8 runs
WT20I 1517	13 July	Nigar Sultana	Harmanpreet Kaur	Sher-e-Bangla National Cricket Stadium, Dhaka	Bangladesh by 4 wickets
2022–2025 ICC Women's Championship – WODI series
No.	Date	Home captain	Away captain	Venue	Result
WODI 1326	16 July	Nigar Sultana	Harmanpreet Kaur	Sher-e-Bangla National Cricket Stadium, Dhaka	Bangladesh by 40 runs (DLS)
WODI 1329	19 July	Nigar Sultana	Harmanpreet Kaur	Sher-e-Bangla National Cricket Stadium, Dhaka	India by 108 runs
WODI 1330	22 July	Nigar Sultana	Harmanpreet Kaur	Sher-e-Bangla National Cricket Stadium, Dhaka	Match tied

=== India in the West Indies and the United States ===
2023–2025 ICC World Test Championship – Test series
No.	Date	Home captain	Away captain	Venue	Result
Test 2510	12–16 July	Kraigg Brathwaite	Rohit Sharma	Windsor Park, Roseau	India by an innings and 141 runs
Test 2513	20–24 July	Kraigg Brathwaite	Rohit Sharma	Queen's Park Oval, Port of Spain	Match drawn
ODI series
No.	Date	Home captain	Away captain	Venue	Result
ODI 4622	27 July	Shai Hope	Rohit Sharma	Kensington Oval, Bridgetown	India by 5 wickets
ODI 4623	29 July	Shai Hope	Hardik Pandya	Kensington Oval, Bridgetown	West Indies by 6 wickets
ODI 4624	1 August	Shai Hope	Hardik Pandya	Brian Lara Cricket Academy, San Fernando	India by 200 runs
T20I series
No.	Date	Home captain	Away captain	Venue	Result
T20I 2188	3 August	Rovman Powell	Hardik Pandya	Brian Lara Cricket Academy, San Fernando	West Indies by 4 runs
T20I 2191	6 August	Rovman Powell	Hardik Pandya	Providence Stadium, Providence	West Indies by 2 wickets
T20I 2192	8 August	Rovman Powell	Hardik Pandya	Providence Stadium, Providence	India by 7 wickets
T20I 2193	12 August	Rovman Powell	Hardik Pandya	Central Broward Park, Lauderhill	India by 9 wickets
T20I 2194	13 August	Rovman Powell	Hardik Pandya	Central Broward Park, Lauderhill	West Indies by 8 wickets

=== Pakistan in Sri Lanka ===
2023–2025 ICC World Test Championship – Test series
No.	Date	Home captain	Away captain	Venue	Result
Test 2511	16–20 July	Dimuth Karunaratne	Babar Azam	Galle International Stadium, Galle	Pakistan by 4 wickets
Test 2514	24–28 July	Dimuth Karunaratne	Babar Azam	Singhalese Sports Club Cricket Ground, Colombo	Pakistan by an innings and 222 runs

=== Australia women in Ireland ===
2022–2025 ICC Women's Championship – WODI series
No.	Date	Home captain	Away captain	Venue	Result
WODI 1330a	23 July	Laura Delany	Alyssa Healy	Castle Avenue, Dublin	Match abandoned
WODI 1331	25 July	Laura Delany	Alyssa Healy	Castle Avenue, Dublin	Australia by 153 runs
WODI 1332	28 July	Laura Delany	Tahlia McGrath	Castle Avenue, Dublin	Australia by 10 wickets

== August ==
=== Ireland women in the Netherlands ===
WT20I series
No.	Date	Home captain	Away captain	Venue	Result
WT20I 1532	14 August	Heather Siegers	Laura Delany	VRA Cricket Ground, Amstelveen	Ireland by 10 wickets
WT20I 1533	16 August	Heather Siegers	Laura Delany	VRA Cricket Ground, Amstelveen	Ireland by 66 runs
WT20I 1534	17 August	Heather Siegers	Laura Delany	VRA Cricket Ground, Amstelveen	Ireland by 6 wickets

=== New Zealand in the UAE ===
T20I series
No.	Date	Home captain	Away captain	Venue	Result
T20I 2198	17 August	Muhammad Waseem	Tim Southee	Dubai International Cricket Stadium, Dubai	New Zealand by 19 runs
T20I 2203	19 August	Muhammad Waseem	Tim Southee	Dubai International Cricket Stadium, Dubai	United Arab Emirates by 7 wickets
T20I 2209	20 August	Muhammad Waseem	Tim Southee	Dubai International Cricket Stadium, Dubai	New Zealand by 32 runs

=== India in Ireland ===
T20I series
No.	Date	Home captain	Away captain	Venue	Result
T20I 2200	18 August	Paul Stirling	Jasprit Bumrah	The Village, Dublin	India by 2 runs (DLS)
T20I 2208	20 August	Paul Stirling	Jasprit Bumrah	The Village, Dublin	India by 33 runs
T20I 2213a	23 August	Paul Stirling	Jasprit Bumrah	The Village, Dublin	Match abandoned

=== Afghanistan vs Pakistan in Sri Lanka ===
ODI series
No.	Date	Home captain	Away captain	Venue	Result
ODI 4625	22 August	Hashmatullah Shahidi	Babar Azam	Mahinda Rajapaksa International Cricket Stadium, Hambantota	Pakistan by 142 runs
ODI 4626	24 August	Hashmatullah Shahidi	Babar Azam	Mahinda Rajapaksa International Cricket Stadium, Hambantota	Pakistan by 1 wicket
ODI 4627	26 August	Hashmatullah Shahidi	Babar Azam	R. Premadasa Stadium, Colombo	Pakistan by 59 runs

=== 2023 Asia Cup ===
Pos	Team	Pld	W	L	T	NR	Pts	NRR
1	Pakistan (H)	2	1	0	0	1	3	4.760
2	India	2	1	0	0	1	3	1.028
3	Nepal	2	0	2	0	0	0	−3.572

Source: ESPNcricinfo
(H) Host

Advances to Super Four

Pos	Team	Pld	W	L	T	NR	Pts	NRR
1	Sri Lanka (H)	2	2	0	0	0	4	0.594
2	Bangladesh	2	1	1	0	0	2	0.373
3	Afghanistan	2	0	2	0	0	0	−0.910

Source: ESPNcricinfo
(H) Host

Advances to Super Four

Round-robin
No.	Date	Team 1	Captain 1	Team 2	Captain 2	Venue	Result
ODI 4628	30 August	Pakistan	Babar Azam	Nepal	Rohit Paudel	Multan Cricket Stadium, Multan	Pakistan by 238 runs
ODI 4629	31 August	Bangladesh	Shakib Al Hasan	Sri Lanka	Dasun Shanaka	Pallekele International Cricket Stadium, Kandy	Sri Lanka by 5 wickets
ODI 4630	2 September	Pakistan	Babar Azam	India	Rohit Sharma	Pallekele International Cricket Stadium, Kandy	No result
ODI 4631	3 September	Afghanistan	Hashmatullah Shahidi	Bangladesh	Shakib Al Hasan	Gaddafi Stadium, Lahore	Bangladesh by 89 runs
ODI 4632	4 September	Nepal	Rohit Paudel	India	Rohit Sharma	Pallekele International Cricket Stadium, Kandy	India by 10 wickets (DLS)
ODI 4633	5 September	Afghanistan	Hashmatullah Shahidi	Sri Lanka	Dasun Shanaka	Gaddafi Stadium, Lahore	Sri Lanka by 2 runs

Pos	Team	Pld	W	L	NR	Pts	NRR
1	India	3	2	1	0	4	1.759
2	Sri Lanka	3	2	1	0	4	−0.134
3	Bangladesh	3	1	2	0	2	−0.469
4	Pakistan	3	1	2	0	2	−1.283

Source: ESPNcricinfo

Advanced to the Final

Super Four
No.	Date	Team 1	Captain 1	Team 2	Captain 2	Venue	Result
ODI 4634	6 September	Pakistan	Babar Azam	Bangladesh	Shakib Al Hasan	Gaddafi Stadium, Lahore	Pakistan by 7 wickets
ODI 4637	9 September	Bangladesh	Shakib Al Hasan	Sri Lanka	Dasun Shanaka	R. Premadasa Stadium, Colombo	Sri Lanka by 21 runs
ODI 4639	10–11 September	Pakistan	Babar Azam	India	Rohit Sharma	R. Premadasa Stadium, Colombo	India by 228 runs
ODI 4641	12 September	India	Rohit Sharma	Sri Lanka	Dasun Shanaka	R. Premadasa Stadium, Colombo	India by 41 runs
ODI 4644	14 September	Pakistan	Babar Azam	Sri Lanka	Dasun Shanaka	R. Premadasa Stadium, Colombo	Sri Lanka by 2 wickets (DLS)
ODI 4645	15 September	India	Rohit Sharma	Bangladesh	Shakib Al Hasan	R. Premadasa Stadium, Colombo	Bangladesh by 6 runs
Final
ODI 4649	17 September	India	Rohit Sharma	Sri Lanka	Dasun Shanaka	R. Premadasa Stadium, Colombo	India by 10 wickets

=== Australia in South Africa ===
T20I series
No.	Date	Home captain	Away captain	Venue	Result
T20I 2224	30 August	Aiden Markram	Mitchell Marsh	Kingsmead Cricket Ground, Durban	Australia by 111 runs
T20I 2228	1 September	Aiden Markram	Mitchell Marsh	Kingsmead Cricket Ground, Durban	Australia by 8 wickets
T20I 2230	3 September	Aiden Markram	Mitchell Marsh	Kingsmead Cricket Ground, Durban	Australia by 5 wickets
ODI series
No.	Date	Home captain	Away captain	Venue	Result
ODI 4635	7 September	Temba Bavuma	Mitchell Marsh	Mangaung Oval, Bloemfontein	Australia by 3 wickets
ODI 4638	9 September	Temba Bavuma	Mitchell Marsh	Mangaung Oval, Bloemfontein	Australia by 123 runs
ODI 4642	12 September	Temba Bavuma	Mitchell Marsh	JB Marks Oval, Potchefstroom	South Africa by 111 runs
ODI 4646	15 September	Aiden Markram	Mitchell Marsh	Centurion Park, Centurion	South Africa by 164 runs
ODI 4648	17 September	Temba Bavuma	Mitchell Marsh	Wanderers Stadium, Johannesburg	South Africa by 122 runs

=== New Zealand in England ===
T20I series
No.	Date	Home captain	Away captain	Venue	Result
T20I 2225	30 August	Jos Buttler	Tim Southee	Riverside Ground, Chester-le-Street	England by 7 wickets
T20I 2229	1 September	Jos Buttler	Tim Southee	Old Trafford, Manchester	England by 95 runs
T20I 2231	3 September	Jos Buttler	Tim Southee	Edgbaston, Birmingham	New Zealand by 74 runs
T20I 2232	5 September	Jos Buttler	Tim Southee	Trent Bridge, Nottingham	New Zealand by 6 wickets
ODI Series
No.	Date	Home Captain	Away Captain	Venue	Result
ODI 4636	8 September	Jos Buttler	Tom Latham	Sophia Gardens, Cardiff	New Zealand by 8 wickets
ODI 4640	10 September	Jos Buttler	Tom Latham	Rose Bowl, Southampton	England by 79 runs (DLS)
ODI 4643	13 September	Jos Buttler	Tom Latham	The Oval, London	England by 181 runs
ODI 4647	15 September	Jos Buttler	Tom Latham	Lord's, London	England by 100 runs

=== Sri Lanka women in England ===
WT20I series
No.	Date	Home captain	Away captain	Venue	Result
WT20I 1566	31 August	Heather Knight	Chamari Athapaththu	County Ground, Hove	England by 12 runs (DLS)
WT20I 1583	2 September	Heather Knight	Chamari Athapaththu	County Ground, Chelmsford	Sri Lanka by 8 wickets
WT20I 1628	6 September	Heather Knight	Chamari Athapaththu	County Ground, Derby	Sri Lanka by 7 wickets
2022–2025 ICC Women's Championship – WODI series
No.	Date	Home captain	Away captain	Venue	Result
WODI 1334	9 September	Heather Knight	Chamari Athapaththu	Riverside Ground, Chester-le-Street	England by 7 wickets
WODI 1336	12 September	Heather Knight	Chamari Athapaththu	County Ground, Northampton	No result
WODI 1338	14 September	Nat Sciver-Brunt	Chamari Athapaththu	Grace Road, Leicester	England by 161 runs

== September ==
=== South Africa women in Pakistan ===
WT20I series
No.	Date	Home captain	Away captain	Venue	Result
WT20I 1573	1 September	Nida Dar	Laura Wolvaardt	National Stadium, Karachi	Pakistan by 5 wickets
WT20I 1593	3 September	Nida Dar	Laura Wolvaardt	National Stadium, Karachi	Pakistan by 7 wickets
WT20I 1602	4 September	Nida Dar	Laura Wolvaardt	National Stadium, Karachi	Pakistan by 6 runs
2022–2025 ICC Women's Championship – WODI series
No.	Date	Home captain	Away captain	Venue	Result
WODI 1333	8 September	Nida Dar	Laura Wolvaardt	National Stadium, Karachi	South Africa by 127 runs
WODI 1335	11 September	Nida Dar	Laura Wolvaardt	National Stadium, Karachi	South Africa by 6 wickets
WODI 1337	14 September	Nida Dar	Laura Wolvaardt	National Stadium, Karachi	Pakistan by 8 wickets

== See also ==
- Associate international cricket in 2023
