= Terdthai Cricket Ground =

Cricket ground

- TCG
- Interactive map of Terdthai Cricket Ground

Ground information
- Location: Lat Krabang, Bangkok
- Country: Thailand
- Coordinates: 13.6936°N 100.8516°E
- Establishment: 2010
- Capacity: 4000
- Owner: Cricket Association of Thailand
- Operator: Cricket Association of Thailand
- Tenants: Thailand national cricket team
- End names
- n/a

International information
- First T20I: 29 February 2020: Thailand v Malaysia
- Last T20I: 28 February 2026: Bahrain v Japan
- First WODI: 19 April 2023: Thailand v Zimbabwe
- Last WODI: 23 April 2023: Thailand v Zimbabwe
- First WT20I: 5 December 2015: Bangladesh v Ireland
- Last WT20I: 14 February 2026: Thailand v Malaysia
- As of 28 February 2026; Source: ESPNcricinfo

Thailand Cricket Ground or Terdthai Cricket Ground is a college ground in Lat Krabang district, Bangkok, Thailand. The Terdthai Cricket Ground (TCG) in Thailand is where Thailand Cricket League matches are played.

In 2015, TCG was named as one of the hosts venues of the Women's World Twenty20 Qualifiers along with Asian Institute of Technology Ground, also in Bangkok.

The TCG also hosted the 2020 ACC Eastern Region T20 qualifier featuring Thailand, Hong Kong, Malaysia, Nepal and Singapore. It was the first time that an official Twenty20 International (T20I) men's tournament was played in Thailand.

== List of International centuries ==
=== T20I centuries ===
Three T20I centuries have been scored at the venue.

No.	Score	Player	Team	Balls	Opposing team	Date	Result
1	122*	Aritra Dutta	Singapore	63	Japan	11 February 2024	Won
2	115*	Waji Ul Hassan	Saudi Arabia	62	Bhutan	15 February 2024	Won

== List of Five-Wicket Hauls ==
=== Twenty20 Internationals ===
This table summarizes the list of five-wicket hauls taken at the venue.

No.	Bowler	Date	Team	Opposing team	Inn	Overs	Runs	Wkts	Econ	Result
1	Haroon Arshad	1 March 2020	Hong Kong	Nepal	2	3.1	16	5	5.05	Won
2	Ma Qiancheng	30 January 2024	China	Myanmar	2	4	9	5	2.25	Won
3	Reo Sakurano-Thomas	2 February 2024	Japan	Thailand	2	3.5	26	6	6.78	Won
4	Zain Ul Abidin	15 February 2024	Saudi Arabia	Bhutan	2	3	6	5	2.00	Won

=== Women's One Day Internationals ===
This table summarizes the list of five-wicket hauls taken at the venue.

No.	Bowler	Date	Team	Opposing team	Inn	Overs	Runs	Wkts	Econ	Result
1	Kelis Ndhlovu	19 April 2023	Zimbabwe	Thailand	1	9	22	5	2.44	Lost
2	Thipatcha Putthawong	19 April 2023	Thailand	Zimbabwe	2	6.1	6	6	0.97	Won

== See also ==
- Asian Institute of Technology Ground
- 2015 ICC Women's World Twenty20 Qualifier
- Cricket Association of Thailand
