= 2026 Men's T20 World Cup Asia Sub-regional Qualifier A =

Qualification tournament for the 2028 T20WC in Asia region

2026 ICC Men's T20 World Cup Asia Sub-regional Qualifier A
- Dates: 5 – 14 October 2026
- Administrator: ICC Asia
- Cricket format: Twenty20 International
- Tournament format: Round-robin
- Host: Malaysia
- Champions: Kuwait
- Runners-up: Bahrain
- Participants: 7
- Matches: 21
- Player of the series: (Kuwait) Adnan Idrees
- Most runs: (Qatar) Zeeshan Haider (187)
- Most wickets: (Bahrain) Ali Dawood (15) (Kuwait) Mohammed Aslam (15)

The 2026 ICC Men's T20 World Cup Asia Sub-regional Qualifier A was a cricket tournament that formed part of the qualification process for the 2028 Men's T20 World Cup. It was hosted by Malaysia from 5 to 14 October 2026.

The top three sides from the tournament advanced to the regional final, where they will be joined by teams from sub-regional qualifier B.

== Squads ==
Bahrain	Bhutan	Kuwait	Mongolia
Asif Ali (c); Fiaz Ahmed; Sohail Ahmed; Imran Anwar; Junaid Aziz; Ahmer Bin Nasir; Ali Dawood; Prashant Kurup (wk); Abdul Majid; Amaish Rana; Shujaat Rasool; Muhammad Rizwan; Asif Shaikh; Muhammad Wasim	Ranjung Mikyo Dorji (c); Gakul Ghalley (vc); Namgang Chejay (wk); Sonam Chophel (wk); Tashi Chophel; Karma Dorji; Tashi Dorji; Thinley Jamtsho; Anand Mongar; Tashi Phuntsho; Tenjin Rabgey; Tsering Tashi (wk); Namgay Thinley; Sonam Yeshey	Mohammed Aslam (c); Ummer Abbas; Clinto Anto; Meet Bhavsar (wk); Anudeep Chenthamara; Sandaruwan Chinthaka (wk); Adnan Idrees; Yasin Patel; Shahrukh Quddus; Ravija Sandaruwan; Mohamed Shafeeq; Bilal Tahir; Muhammad Umar; Ali Zaheer	Luwsanzundui Erdenebulgan (c); Temuulen Amarmend; Bayarjargal Batbayr; Uugan-Erdene Batjargal; Namsrai Bat-yalalt (wk); Munkhsuld Erdenebat; Gandemberel Ganbold; Sodbileg Gantulga; Bayanbuu Jargaltuya; Od Lutbayar (wk); Bilegdemberel Munkhdelger; Zoljavkhlan Shurentsetseg; Battulga Tamjidsuren; Tumursukh Turmunkh
Myanmar	Qatar	Thailand	
Ko Ko Lin Thu (c); Htet Lin Aung; Myat Thu Aung; Thuya Aung; Khin Aye; Paing Danu; Nyan Lin Htet; Nay Lin Htike; Nay Lin Htun; Aung Ko Ko; Swann Htet Ko Ko (wk); Kaung Htet Kyaw; Kyaw Zin Lin; Htet Lin Oo; Nyein Chan Soe; Ye Naing Tun (wk); Pyae Phyo Wai	Mirza Mohammed Baig (c); Shahzeb Afridi; Owais Ahmed; Zubair Ali; Muhammad Asim; Zeeshan Haider; Muhammed Ikram; Shahzaib Jamil; Imal Liyanage (wk); Daniel Louis; Shariq Munir; Mujeeb-ur-Rehman; Obaid ur Rehman; Akshay Shankar	Austin Lazarus (c); Thanadon Buri; Chaloemwong Chatpaisan; Phatummakan Donkaew; Pattarapol Jirapatananukul; Mukesh Kumar; Sarawut Maliwan; Chanchai Pengkumta; Kamron Senamontree; Nopphon Senamontree; Phiriyaphong Suanchuai (wk); Phanuphong Thongsa; Aruesanan Wichakam; Akshaykumar Yadav	

== Bhutan in Nepal ==
The Bhutan men's cricket team toured Nepal to play four warm-up practice matches in Pokhara at Pokhara Rangasala from 29 September to 2 October 2026. The tour served as their final preparation before heading to Malaysia for the qualifier.

Bhutan tour matches in Nepal

Match 1
29 September 2026
13:15
Scorecard

Bhutan; 96 (19.3 overs)	v	Gandaki Province; 97/2 (11 overs)
Sonam Chophel 27 (19); Subash Bhandari 4/15 (4 overs)		Ishwar Chhetri 34 (22); Sonam Yeshey 1/21 (4 overs)

Gandaki Province won by 8 wickets
Pokhara Rangasala, Pokhara
Umpires: Bhoj Raj Baral (Nep) and Arjun Upadhayay (Nep)
Player of the match: Subash Bhandari (Nep)

- Gandaki Province won the toss and elected to field.

Match 2
30 September 2026
10:00
Scorecard

Gandaki Province; 196/7 (20 overs)	v	Bhutan; 132 (17.4 overs)
Cibrin Shrestha 45 (24); Thinley Jamtsho 4/27 (4 overs)		Sonam Chophel 43 (21); Bipin Khatri 4/22 (3.4 overs)

Gandaki Province won by 64 runs
Pokhara Rangasala, Pokhara
Umpires: Durga Chand (Nep) and Sanjay Kant Sigdel (Nep)
Player of the match: Cibrin Shrestha (Nep)

- Bhutan won the toss and elected to field.

Match 3
1 October 2026
10:00
Scorecard

CAN XI; 123/9 (20 overs)	v	Bhutan; 110/9 (20 overs)
Bipin Khatri 52* (36); Sonam Yeshey 2/11 (4 overs)		Namgay Thinley 29 (44); Bipin Sharma 3/15 (4 overs)

CAN XI won by 13 runs
Pokhara Rangasala, Pokhara
Umpires: Dilip Agrahari (Nep) and Sanjay Kant Sigdel (Nep)
Player of the match: Bipin Khatri (Nep)

- CAN XI won the toss and elected to bat.

Match 4
2 October 2026
08:45
Scorecard

CAN XI; 176/7 (20 overs)	v	Bhutan; 72 (17.3 overs)
Trit Raj Das 51 (31); Anand Mongar 3/27 (3 overs)		Anand Mongar 15 (12); Bipin Sharma 5/7 (4 overs)

CAN XI won by 104 runs
Pokhara Rangasala, Pokhara
Umpires: Bhoj Raj Baral (Nep) and Arjun Upadhayay (Nep)
Player of the match: Bipin Sharma (Nep)

- Bhutan won the toss and elected to field.

== Points table ==
Qualifier A standings
Pos	Team	Pld	W	L	NR	Pts	NRR	Qualification
1	Kuwait	6	5	1	0	10	5.775	Advanced to the regional final
2	Bahrain	6	5	1	0	10	2.283	Advanced to the regional final
3	Qatar	6	4	1	1	9	1.960	Advanced to the regional final
4	Thailand	6	3	3	0	6	1.518	Eliminated
5	Bhutan	6	2	4	0	4	−1.139	Eliminated
6	Myanmar	6	1	5	0	2	−2.013	Eliminated
7	Mongolia	6	0	5	1	1	−8.450	Eliminated

Source: Cricinfo

== Fixtures ==
5 October 2026
14:00
Scorecard

Bhutan; 119/8 (20 overs)	v	Myanmar; 92/9 (20 overs)
Thinley Jamtsho 40* (27); Paing Danu 3/23 (4 overs)		Paing Danu 16 (19); Gakul Ghalley 3/28 (4 overs)

Bhutan won by 27 runs
Bayuemas Oval, Pandamaran
Umpires: Tabarak Dar (HK) and Durga Subedi (Nep)
Player of the match: Thinley Jamtsho (Bhu)

- Bhutan won the toss and elected to bat.

5 October 2026
09:15
Scorecard

Bahrain; 104/6 (20 overs)	v	Thailand; 97/8 (20 overs)
Junaid Aziz 26 (27); Nopphon Senamontree 2/15 (4 overs)		Pattarapol Jirapatananukul 23 (25); Asif Javed 3/14 (4 overs)

Bahrain won by 7 runs
UKM-YSD Cricket Oval, Bangi
Umpires: Viswanadan Kalidas (Mas) and Narayanan Sivan (Mas)
Player of the match: Asif Javed (Bhr)

- Thailand won the toss and elected to field.

5 October 2026
09:15
Scorecard

Kuwait; 199/7 (20 overs)	v	Qatar; 141/8 (20 overs)
Bilal Tahir 32* (16); Daniel Louis 2/29 (3 overs)		Imal Liyanage 39 (28); Adnan Idrees 2/22 (4 overs)

Kuwait won by 58 runs
Bayuemas Oval, Pandamaran
Umpires: Morshed Ali Khan (Ban) and Ramasamy Venkatesh (HK)
Player of the match: Adnan Idrees (Kuw)

- Qatar won the toss and elected to field.
- Obaid ur Rahman (Qat) made his T20I debut.

6 October 2026
09:15
Scorecard

Thailand; 76/9 (20 overs)	v	Qatar; 80/3 (12.3 overs)
Chaloemwong Chatphaisan 16 (13); Shariq Munir 2/8 (3 overs)		Zeeshan Haider 47* (41); Chanchai Pengkumta 2/13 (3 overs)

Qatar won by 7 wickets
Bayuemas Oval, Pandamaran
Umpires: Aasif Iqbal (UAE) and Durga Subedi (Nep)
Player of the match: Zeeshan Haider (Qat)

- Qatar won the toss and elected to field.

6 October 2026
14:00
Scorecard

Bahrain; 139/5 (20 overs)	v	Bhutan; 73 (18.4 overs)
Junaid Aziz 45 (35); Gakul Ghalley 1/14 (2.2 overs)		Namgang Chejay 26 (31); Ali Dawood 4/8 (4 overs)

Bahrain won by 66 runs
Bayuemas Oval, Pandamaran
Umpires: Morshed Ali Khan (Ban) and Viswanadan Kalidas (Mas)
Player of the match: Ali Dawood (Bhr)

- Bahrain won the toss and elected to bat.

6 October 2026
14:00
Scorecard

Mongolia; 42 (14.5 overs)	v	Kuwait; 43/0 (3.3 overs)
Gandemberel Ganbold 21 (32); Mohammed Aslam 5/19 (4 overs)		Ravija Sandaruwan 30* (14)

Kuwait won by 10 wickets
UKM-YSD Cricket Oval, Bangi
Umpires: Ahmad Shah Pakteen (Afg) and Buddhi Pradhan (Nep)
Player of the match: Mohammed Aslam (Kuw)

- Kuwait won the toss and elected to field.
- Uugan-Erdene Batjargal, Bayanbuu Jargaltuya, Bilegdemberel Munkhdelger and Battulga Tamjidsuren (Mgl) all made their T20I debuts.
- Mohammed Aslam (Kuw) became the first Kuwaiti player to take a five-wicket haul in T20Is.

8 October 2026
09:15
Scorecard

Thailand; 60 (18.3 overs)	v	Kuwait; 61/1 (7 overs)
Akshaykumar Yadav 26 (31); Mohammed Aslam 3/9 (4 overs)		Ravija Sandaruwan 53* (19); Austin Lazarus 1/28 (3 overs)

Kuwait won by 9 wickets
Bayuemas Oval, Pandamaran
Umpires: Viswanadan Kalidas (Mas) and Ramasamy Venkatesh (HK)
Player of the match: Ravija Sandaruwan (Kuw)

- Kuwait won the toss and elected to field.

8 October 2026
14:00
Scorecard

Bhutan; 203/5 (20 overs)	v	Mongolia; 67 (15 overs)
Tenjin Rabgey 108 (58); Sodbileg Gantulga 2/21 (3 overs)		Sodbileg Gantulga 23 (19); Tashi Dorji 4/15 (4 overs)

Bhutan won by 136 runs
UKM-YSD Cricket Oval, Bangi
Umpires: Morshed Ali Khan (Ban) and Durga Subedi (Nep)
Player of the match: Tenjin Rabgey (Bhu)

- Bhutan won the toss and elected to bat.
- Bayarjargal Batbayr (Mgl) made his T20I debut.
- Tenjin Rabgey (Bhu) scored his maiden century in T20Is.

8 October 2026
14:00
Scorecard

Myanmar; 70/9 (20 overs)	v	Bahrain; 73/2 (11.2 overs)
Pyae Phyo Wai 23 (41); Abdul Majid 5/25 (4 overs)		Shujaat Rasool 22 (13); Pyae Phyo Wai 1/22 (4 overs)

Bahrain won by 8 wickets
Selangor Turf Club, Seri Kembangan
Umpires: Ahmad Shah Pakteen (Afg) and Narayanan Sivan (Mas)
Player of the match: Abdul Majid (Bhr)

- Bahrain won the toss and elected to field.
- Nay Lin Htike and Kyaw Zin Lin (Mya) both made their T20I debuts.
- Abdul Majid took his first hat-trick in T20Is.

9 October 2026
09:15
Scorecard

Thailand; 196/2 (20 overs)	v	Mongolia; 13 (11.3 overs)
Akshaykumar Yadav 93* (65); Tumursukh Turmunkh 1/42 (4 overs)		Gandemberel Ganbold 5 (11); Phanuphong Thongsa 4/2 (2 overs)

Thailand won by 183 runs
Bayuemas Oval, Pandamaran
Umpires: Morshed Ali Khan (Ban) and Ahmed Shah Durrani (Afg)
Player of the match: Phanuphong Thongsa (Tha)

- Thailand won the toss and elected to bat.
- Munkhsuld Erdenebat (Mgl) made his T20I debut.
- Phanuphong Thongsa (Tha) took his first hat-trick in T20Is.

9 October 2026
09:15
Scorecard

Myanmar; 55/9 (20 overs)	v	Qatar; 56/1 (7 overs)
Htet Lin Oo 16 (20); Daniel Louis 4/6 (4 overs)		Zubair Ali 34* (24); Pyae Phyo Wai 1/22 (3 overs)

Qatar won by 9 wickets
Selangor Turf Club, Seri Kembangan
Umpires: Buddhi Pradhan (Nep) and Ramasamy Venkatesh (HK)
Player of the match: Daniel Louis (Qat)

- Myanmar won the toss and elected to bat.
- Nyan Lin Htet (Mya) made his T20I debut.

9 October 2026
09:15
Scorecard

Kuwait; 188/7 (20 overs)	v	Bahrain; 189/4 (19.2 overs)
Muhammad Umar 78 (38); Ali Dawood 3/14 (4 overs)		Asif Ali 89 (48); Adnan Idrees 2/23 (4 overs)

Bahrain won by 6 wickets
UKM-YSD Cricket Oval, Bangi
Umpires: Aasif Iqbal (UAE) and Narayanan Sivan (Mas)
Player of the match: Asif Ali (Bhr)

- Bahrain won the toss and elected to field.

11 October 2026
14:00
Scorecard

Bhutan; 64 (15.5 overs)	v	Qatar; 65/1 (5.4 overs)
Namgang Chejay 16 (22); Muhammad Asim 4/6 (4 overs)		Zubair Ali 45 (22); Sonam Yeshey 1/16 (1.4 overs)

Qatar won by 9 wickets
UKM-YSD Cricket Oval, Bangi
Umpires: Morshed Ali Khan (Ban) and Durga Subedi (Nep)
Player of the match: Muhammad Asim (Qat)

- Qatar won the toss and elected to field.

11 October 2026
14:00
Scorecard

Myanmar; 34 (15.3 overs)	v	Kuwait; 37/1 (4 overs)
Pyae Phyo Wai 8 (15); Mohammed Aslam 3/6 (3.3 overs)		Meet Bhavsar 17* (11); Ko Ko Lin Thu 1/18 (2 overs)

Kuwait won by 9 wickets
Bayuemas Oval, Pandamaran
Umpires: Ahmad Shah Pakteen (Afg) and Ramasamy Venkatesh (HK)
Player of the match: Mohammed Aslam (Kuw)

- Kuwait won the toss and elected to field.
- Ummer Abbas (Kuw) made his T20I debut.

11 October 2026
14:00
Scorecard

Mongolia; 17 (12.4 overs)	v	Bahrain; 18/2 (1.1 overs)
Gandemberel Ganbold 4 (3); Ali Dawood 5/5 (4 overs)		Asif Ali 11* (3); Luwsanzundui Erdenebulgan 2/13 (1 over)

Bahrain won by 8 wickets
Selangor Turf Club, Seri Kembangan
Umpires: Tabarak Dar (HK) and Viswanadan Kalidas (Mas)
Player of the match: Ali Dawood (Bhr)

- Bahrain won the toss and elected to field.
- Muhammad Wasim (Bhr) made his T20I debut.

12 October 2026
14:00
Scorecard

Qatar; 211/3 (16.1 overs)	v	Mongolia
Zeeshan Haider 79 (41); Munkhsuld Erdenebat 1/11 (1 over)

No result
Bayuemas Oval, Pandamaran
Umpires: Tabarak Dar (HK) and Buddhi Pradhan (Nep)

- Mongolia won the toss and elected to field.
- No further play was possible due to rain.
- Akshay Shankar (Qat) made his T20I debut.

12 October 2026
14:00
Scorecard

Myanmar; 52 (16 overs)	v	Thailand; 53/1 (9.5 overs)
Paing Danu 17 (23); Phanuphong Thongsa 4/13 (4 overs)		Akshaykumar Yadav 32* (34); Kaung Htet Kyaw 1/17 (2 overs)

Thailand won by 9 wickets
UKM-YSD Cricket Oval, Bangi
Umpires: Ahmad Shah Pakteen (Afg) and Narayanan Sivan (Mas)
Player of the match: Phanuphong Thongsa (Tha)

- Thailand won the toss and elected to field.

12 October 2026
14:00
Scorecard

Bhutan; 74/9 (20 overs)	v	Kuwait; 78/2 (4.2 overs)
Namgang Chejay 20 (23); Yasin Patel 4/12 (4 overs)		Ravija Sandaruwan 40* (11); Tashi Phuntsho 1/29 (2 overs)

Kuwait won by 8 wickets
Selangor Turf Club, Seri Kembangan
Umpires: Morshed Ali Khan (Ban) and Ahmed Shah Durrani (Afg)
Player of the match: Yasin Patel (Kuw)

- Kuwait won the toss and elected to field.

14 October 2026
09:15
Scorecard

Mongolia; 56 (16.4 overs)	v	Myanmar; 60/1 (5.2 overs)
Luwsanzundui Erdenebulgan 26 (22); Paing Danu 3/16 (4 overs)		Paing Danu 22* (17); Sodbileg Gantulga 1/9 (1 over)

Myanmar won by 9 wickets
UKM-YSD Cricket Oval, Bangi
Umpires: Tabarak Dar (HK) and Ramasamy Venkatesh (HK)
Player of the match: Paing Danu (Mya)

- Myanmar won the toss and elected to field.

14 October 2026
09:15
Scorecard

Bahrain; 119 (20 overs)	v	Qatar; 120/8 (20 overs)
Imran Anwar 38* (26); Owais Ahmed 3/12 (4 overs)		Zeeshan Haider 32 (31); Abdul Majid 2/9 (4 overs)

Qatar won by 2 wickets
Selangor Turf Club, Seri Kembangan
Umpires: Morshed Ali Khan (Ban) and Viswanadan Kalidas (Mas)
Player of the match: Owais Ahmed (Qat)

- Qatar won the toss and elected to field.

14 October 2026
14:00
Scorecard

Thailand; 134/8 (20 overs)	v	Bhutan; 97 (18.5 overs)
Chaloemwong Chatpaisan 37 (34); Tashi Phuntsho 2/20 (4 overs)		Tenjin Rabgey 43 (43); Nopphon Senamontree 5/10 (4 overs)

Thailand won by 37 runs
Selangor Turf Club, Seri Kembangan
Umpires: Narayanan Sivan (Mas) and Durga Subedi (Nep)
Player of the match: Nopphon Senamontree (Tha)

- Thailand won the toss and elected to bat.

== See also ==
- 2026 Men's T20 World Cup Asia Sub-regional Qualifier B
