= Brunei national cricket team =

Cricket Team in Brunei

Brunei
- Association: Brunei Darussalam National Cricket Association

International Cricket Council
- ICC status: Affiliate (1992); Suspended (2014); Removed (2015)
- ICC region: Asia

International cricket
- First international: Brunei v. Japan (Kuala Lumpur, Malaysia; 6 September 1996)
- As of 4 September 2015

The Brunei national cricket team was the team that represented the country of Brunei in international cricket. It was organised by the Brunei Darussalam National Cricket Association, which became an affiliate member of the International Cricket Council in 1992. However, the association was expelled in 2015 (having been suspended in 2014), meaning the team's current status is unclear. The first century scored by the Brunei Cricket Team was against Sabah in 1979 by Julian Dalzell. This was in the Borneo Cup. Brunei played its first recorded match in 1983, but did not appear in an international game until the 1996 ACC Trophy. The side did not appear in another Asian Cricket Council (ACC) tournament until 2004, but made regular appearances throughout the remainder of the decade. Brunei's last major tournament to date was the 2010 ACC Trophy Challenge in Thailand.

== Tournament history ==
=== ACC Trophy ===
- 1996: Group stages
- 2006: Group stages
- 2009 Challenge: 6th place
- 2010 Challenge: 7th place

== Overall record ==
=== One-day ===
Below is a record of the one-day international matches played by Brunei between 1996 and 2010.

| Opponent | M | W | L | T | NR |
|---|---|---|---|---|---|
| Bangladesh | 1 | 0 | 1 | 0 | 0 |
| Bhutan | 1 | 0 | 1 | 0 | 0 |
| China | 1 | 0 | 1 | 0 | 0 |
| Fiji | 1 | 0 | 1 | 0 | 0 |
| Hong Kong | 1 | 0 | 1 | 0 | 0 |
| Iran | 1 | 0 | 1 | 0 | 0 |
| Japan | 1 | 1 | 0 | 0 | 0 |
| Malaysia | 1 | 0 | 0 | 0 | 1 |
| Maldives | 1 | 0 | 1 | 0 | 0 |
| Myanmar | 2 | 2 | 0 | 0 | 0 |
| Nepal | 1 | 0 | 1 | 0 | 0 |
| Oman | 1 | 0 | 1 | 0 | 0 |
| Saudi Arabia | 2 | 0 | 2 | 0 | 0 |
| United Arab Emirates | 1 | 1 | 0 | 0 | 0 |
| Total | 16 | 4 | 11 | 0 | 1 |
