= 2022 Malaysia Quadrangular Series =

International cricket tournament

- Dates: 2 – 11 July 2022
- Administrator: Malaysian Cricket Association
- Cricket format: Twenty20 International
- Host: Malaysia
- Champions: Malaysia
- Runners-up: Bhutan
- Participants: 4
- Matches: 13
- Most runs: (Malaysia) Zubaidi Zulkifle (215)
- Most wickets: (Malaysia) Syazrul Idrus (16)

The 2022 Malaysia Quadrangular Series was a Twenty20 International (T20I) cricket tournament took place in Malaysia in July 2022. The participating teams were the hosts Malaysia along with Bhutan, Maldives and Thailand.

The Maldives squad travelled to Sri Lanka to play five practice matches before arriving in Malaysia for the series. In the week before the tournament, Malaysia travelled to Singapore to play a three-match T20I series for the Stan Nagaiah Trophy.

The hosts won all six of their games in the round-robin stage. Malaysia defeated Bhutan by 9 wickets in the final.

== Squads ==
| Bhutan | Malaysia | Maldives | Thailand |
|---|---|---|---|
| Jigme Singye (c); Thinley Jamtsho (vc); Manoj Adhikari; Namgang Chejay; Ranjung Mikyo Dorji; Gakul Ghalley; Sherab Loday; Kinley Penjor; Suprit Pradhan; Tenjin Rabgey; Namgay Thinley; Ngawang Thinley; Tenzin Wangchuk; Sonam Yeshey | Ahmad Faiz (c); Virandeep Singh (vc, wk); Muhammad Amir; Syed Aziz; Ainool Hafizs; Khizar Hayat; Syazrul Idrus; Sharvin Muniandy; Nazril Rahman; Fitri Sham; Pavandeep Singh; Muhamad Syahadat; Vijay Unni; Muhammad Wafiq; Zubaidi Zulkifle | Azyan Farhath (c); Umar Adam (vc); Shunan Ali; Mohamed Azzam; Ahmed Hassan; Ibrahim Hassan; Ali Imman; Nazwan Ismail; Wedage Malinda; Ameel Mauroof; Ibrahim Nashath; Hassan Rasheed; Rasheed Rassam; Mohamed Rishwan; Ibrahim Rizan; Abdullah Shahid; Leem Shafeeg | Chanchai Pengkumta (c); Thanadon Buree; Chaloemwong Chatphaisan; Panuwat Desungnoen; Sorawat Desungnoen; Khanitson Namchaikul; Narawit Nuntarach; Jeerasak Pakhiaokajee; Yodsak Saranonnakkun; Kamron Senamontree; Vichanath Singh; Phiriyapong Suanchuai (wk); Sirawit Takanta; Phanuphong Thongsa; Thanaphon Yotharat |

== Round-robin ==
| Pos | Team | Pld | W | L | NR | Pts | NRR |
|---|---|---|---|---|---|---|---|
| 1 | Malaysia | 6 | 6 | 0 | 0 | 12 | 5.495 |
| 2 | Bhutan | 6 | 4 | 2 | 0 | 8 | −1.356 |
| 3 | Maldives | 6 | 2 | 4 | 0 | 4 | −0.665 |
| 4 | Thailand | 6 | 0 | 6 | 0 | 0 | −2.484 |

Source: ESPN Cricinfo

Advanced to the final

2 July 2022
11:00
Scorecard

| Malaysia; 213/4 (20 overs) | v | Bhutan; 58/8 (20 overs) |
| Zubaidi Zulkifle 96 (43); Ngawang Thinley 2/43 (4 overs) | | Namgay Thinley 17 (25); Muhammad Wafiq 2/14 (4 overs) |

Malaysia won by 155 runs
UKM-YSD Cricket Oval, Bangi
Umpires: Rudy Ismandy (Mas) and Narayanan Sivan (Mas)
Player of the match: Zubaidi Zulkifle (Mas)

- Bhutan won the toss and elected to field.
- Manoj Adhikari, Gakul Ghalley, Kinley Penjor, Suprit Pradhan, Namgay Thinley, Ngawang Thinley and Tenzin Wangchuk (Bhu) all made their T20I debuts.

3 July 2022
10:30
Scorecard

| Thailand; 81 (19.3 overs) | v | Maldives; 82/3 (15.4 overs) |
| Narawit Nuntarach 24 (23); Leem Shafeeg 3/9 (2.3 overs) | | Mohamed Rishwan 38* (33); Thanadon Buree 2/12 (2 overs) |

Maldives won by 7 wickets
UKM-YSD Cricket Oval, Bangi
Umpires: Mathan Kumar (Mas) and Narayanan Sivan (Mas)
Player of the match: Leem Shafeeg (Mdv)

- Thailand won the toss and elected to bat.
- Thanadon Buree, Chaloemwong Chatphaisan, Khanitson Namchaikul, Narawit Nuntarach, Jeerasak Pakhiaokajee and Yodsak Saranonnakkun (Tha) all made their T20I debuts.

3 July 2022
14:30
Scorecard

| Malaysia; 112/9 (20 overs) | v | Bhutan; 73 (19.4 overs) |
| Fitri Sham 40* (38); Ngawang Thinley 3/12 (4 overs) | | Namgay Thinley 25 (27); Virandeep Singh 3/4 (4 overs) |

Malaysia won by 39 runs
UKM-YSD Cricket Oval, Bangi
Umpires: Mathan Kumar (Mas) and Narayanan Sivan (Mas)
Player of the match: Fitri Sham (Mas)

- Malaysia won the toss and elected to bat.
- Sonam Yeshey (Bhu) made his T20I debut.

4 July 2022
10:30
Scorecard

| Thailand; 30 (13.1 overs) | v | Malaysia; 34/1 (3.5 overs) |
| Phiriyapong Suanchuai 9 (6); Syazrul Idrus 4/17 (4 overs) | | Virandeep Singh 18* (13); Chanchai Pengkumta 1/12 (2 overs) |

Malaysia won by 9 wickets
UKM-YSD Cricket Oval, Bangi
Umpires: Rudy Ismandy (Mas) and Viswanadan Kalidas (Mas)
Player of the match: Syazrul Idrus (Mas)

- Thailand won the toss and elected to bat.
- Phanuphong Thongsa (Tha) made his T20I debut.
- Syazrul Idrus became the first bowler for Malaysia to take a hat-trick in T20Is.

4 July 2022
14:30
Scorecard

| Bhutan; 110/9 (20 overs) | v | Maldives; 104/8 (20 overs) |
| Gakul Ghalley 17 (18); Azyan Farhath 3/17 (4 overs) | | Mohamed Rishwan 19 (12); Namgay Thinley 3/15 (4 overs) |

Bhutan won by 6 runs
UKM-YSD Cricket Oval, Bangi
Umpires: Rudy Ismandy (Mas) and Viswanadan Kalidas (Mas)
Player of the match: Namgay Thinley (Bhu)

- Maldives won the toss and elected to field.
- Tenjin Rabgey (Bhu) and Shunan Ali (Mdv) both made their T20I debuts.

6 July 2022
10:30
Scorecard

| Thailand; 49/8 (11 overs) | v | Bhutan; 50/4 (9.4 overs) |
| Phiriyapong Suanchuai 17 (26); Ngawang Thinley 4/13 (2 overs) | | Sherab Loday 22 (25); Sorawat Desungnoen 1/8 (2 overs) |

Bhutan won by 6 wickets
UKM-YSD Cricket Oval, Bangi
Umpires: Viswanadan Kalidas (Mas) and Narayanan Sivan (Mas)
Player of the match: Ngawang Thinley (Bhu)

- Bhutan won the toss and elected to field.
- The match was reduced to 11 overs per side due to rain.
- Sherab Loday (Bhu) made his T20I debut.

6 July 2022
14:30
Scorecard

| Maldives; 57/8 (10 overs) | v | Malaysia; 59/2 (4.2 overs) |
| Hassan Rasheed 20 (12); Virandeep Singh 3/5 (2 overs) | | Zubaidi Zulkifle 26* (10); Azyan Farhath 2/11 (1.2 overs) |

Malaysia won by 8 wickets (DLS method)
UKM-YSD Cricket Oval, Bangi
Umpires: Viswanadan Kalidas (Mas) and Narayanan Sivan (Mas)
Player of the match: Virandeep Singh (Mas)

- Malaysia won the toss and elected to field.
- Malaysia were set a revised target of 59 runs from 10 overs due to rain.
- Abdullah Shahid (Mdv) made his T20I debut.

7 July 2022
10:30
Scorecard

| Bhutan; 110/7 (20 overs) | v | Maldives; 108 (20 overs) |
| Thinley Jamtsho 39 (44); Umar Adam 2/8 (4 overs) | | Hassan Rasheed 27 (19); Namgay Thinley 3/15 (4 overs) |

Bhutan won by 2 runs
UKM-YSD Cricket Oval, Bangi
Umpires: Rudy Ismandy (Mas) and Mathan Kumar (Mas)
Player of the match: Namgay Thinley (Bhu)

- Maldives won the toss and elected to field.

7 July 2022
14:30
Scorecard

| Thailand; 73 (18.5 overs) | v | Malaysia; 74/1 (8.5 overs) |
| Phiriyapong Suanchuai 37 (38); Syazrul Idrus 4/21 (3.5 overs) | | Virandeep Singh 28* (28); Thanaphon Yotharat 1/9 (1 over) |

Malaysia won by 9 wickets
UKM-YSD Cricket Oval, Bangi
Umpires: Rudy Ismandy (Mas) and Mathan Kumar (Mas)
Player of the match: Syazrul Idrus (Mas)

- Malaysia won the toss and elected to field.
- Thanaphon Yotharat (Tha) made his T20I debut.

8 July 2022
11:00
Scorecard

| Maldives; 97 (19.3 overs) | v | Thailand; 56 (16.5 overs) |
| Azyan Farhath 24 (40); Kamron Senamontree 4/19 (4 overs) | | Chaloemwong Chatphaisan 15 (17); Azyan Farhath 4/12 (2.5 overs) |

Maldives won by 41 runs
UKM-YSD Cricket Oval, Bangi
Umpires: Rudy Ismandy (Mas) and Narayanan Sivan (Mas)
Player of the match: Azyan Farhath (Mdv)

- Thailand won the toss and elected to field.
- Kamron Senamontree became the first bowler for Thailand to take a hat-trick in T20Is.

9 July 2022
10:30
Scorecard

| Malaysia; 230/4 (20 overs) | v | Maldives; 136/6 (20 overs) |
| Virandeep Singh 72 (44); Ibrahim Hassan 2/44 (4 overs) | | Umar Adam 50 (29); Sharvin Muniandy 3/21 (3 overs) |

Malaysia won by 94 runs
UKM-YSD Cricket Oval, Bangi
Umpires: Viswanadan Kalidas (Mas) and Mathan Kumar (Mas)
Player of the match: Virandeep Singh (Mas)

- Maldives won the toss and elected to field.

9 July 2022
14:30
Scorecard

| Bhutan; 135/6 (20 overs) | v | Thailand; 107/7 (20 overs) |
| Thinley Jamtsho 51 (41); Chanchai Pengkumta 2/25 (4 overs) | | Jeerasak Pakhiaokajee 22* (22); Namgay Thinley 2/21 (4 overs) |

Bhutan won by 28 runs
UKM-YSD Cricket Oval, Bangi
Umpires: Viswanadan Kalidas (Mas) and Mathan Kumar (Mas)
Player of the match: Thinley Jamtsho (Bhu)

- Bhutan won the toss and elected to bat.
- Panuwat Desungnoen (Tha) made his T20I debut.

== Final ==
11 July 2022
11:00
Scorecard

| Bhutan; 82 (19.1 overs) | v | Malaysia; 84/1 (6.3 overs) |
| Thinley Jamtsho 37 (30); Syazrul Idrus 3/13 (3.1 overs) | | Syed Aziz 44* (25); Thinley Jamtsho 1/16 (2 overs) |

Malaysia won by 9 wickets
UKM-YSD Cricket Oval, Bangi
Umpires: Viswanadan Kalidas (Mas) and Narayanan Sivan (Mas)
Player of the match: Syed Aziz (Mas)

- Malaysia won the toss and elected to field.
