= Mongolia Cricket Association =

Governing body for cricket in Mongolia

- Sport: Cricket
- Founded: 2007
- Affiliation: International Cricket Council (ICC)
- Affiliation date: 2021
- Regional affiliation: Asian Cricket Council
- Affiliation date: 2025
- Location: Ulaanbaatar
- President: Battulga Gombo

Official website
- cricketmongolia.mn
- (Mongolia)

The Mongolia Cricket Association (MCA) is the governing body for cricket in Mongolia. Established in 2007 in Ulaanbaatar by Battulga Gombo, the association organizes domestic cricket activities and supports the development of the sport at grassroots and national levels.

The association became an affiliate member of the International Cricket Council in 2021 and joined the Asian Cricket Council in 2025. These affiliations enabled participation in regional cricket development initiatives and administrative support programs.

== History ==
The Mongolia Cricket Association (MCA) was founded to organize and promote cricket activities in Mongolia. Early development efforts included introductory programs, coaching sessions, and equipment support for students and new participants in Ulaanbaatar.

In May 2013, the association organized an introductory cricket program at a secondary school in Ulaanbaatar. The program included basic training sessions and the provision of cricket equipment to support student participation.

Following international affiliation, the association has participated in regional cricket development activities and administrative programs coordinated through international and regional governing bodies.

== National teams ==
Men's team: Mongolia made their international debut against Nepal at Zhejiang University of Technology Cricket Field, Hangzhou on 27 September 2023, and has since played multiple T20Is at 2024 Men's T20 World Cup Asia Sub-regional Qualifier A, against Maldives, Japan, Kuwait, Hongkong, Myanmar, Singapore and Malaysia.

Women's team: Mongolia played their first WT20I on 19 September 2023, against Indonesia, during the 2022 Asian Games.

== Role and activities ==
The association oversees the development of cricket in Mongolia, including grassroots programs, domestic activities, and national team administration.The first cricket introductory program in Mongolia was launched by MCA at secondary school number 34 in Ulaanbaatar in May 2013. The cricket program was four weeks long and resumed during the next school term. MCA has plans to introduce cricket into more secondary schools in Ulaanbaatar.

== See also ==
- Mongolia national cricket team
- Mongolia women's national cricket team
- Cricket in Mongolia
- List of Mongolia Twenty20 International cricketers
