= 2010 ACC Trophy Challenge =

- Administrator: Asian Cricket Council
- Cricket format: 50 overs per side
- Tournament format: Round robin with playoffs
- Host: Thailand
- Champions: Maldives (1st title)
- Participants: 8 teams
- Matches: 18
- Most runs: Moosa Kaleem (173)
- Most wickets: Abdullah Shahid (14)
- Official website: Tournament home

The 2010 ACC Trophy Challenge was a cricket tournament in Thailand, taking place between 4–11 December 2010. It gives Associate and Affiliate members of the Asian Cricket Council experience of international one-day cricket and also helps forms an essential part of regional rankings. The tournament was won by the Maldives who defeated Saudi Arabia by one wicket.

== Teams ==
- Iran
- Myanmar
- Qatar
- Thailand
- Brunei
- China
- Maldives
- Saudi Arabia

== Squads ==
Brunei	China	Iran	Maldives
Sujaya Kamat (captain); Gurlal Singh; Davinder Singh; Shorin Khan; Basil George; Sreejith Kallumpurath; Haridas Shyamkumar; Samantha Weerakoon (wk); Sukhminder Singh; Shavez Cheema; Ajab Khan; Mohanan Santhosh; Jahaber Ali; Kashif Javed; Surya Thapa (coach)	Wang Lei (captain); Zhang Qirui; Zhang Xinliang; Zhang Peng; Zhang Yufei; Wang Dianyi; Wang Xin (wk); Wang Jing; Song Yangyang; Hou Sifeng; Li Jian; Zhao Gaosheng; Jiang Shuyao; Sun Duo; Rashid Khan (coach)	Yousef Raeisi (captain); Salman Sheikhi; Ebrahim Badrouzehi; Ali Narouei; Yahya Sheikhi (wk); Rashed Bameri; Abdolvahab Ebrahimipour; Naeim Bameri; Dad Khoda Dahani; Masood Jayezeh; Shirmohammad Balouchnezhad; Loghman Sheikhi; Najib Arjamandi; Mohammad Hotinik; Rashid Dar (coach)	Moosa Kaleem (captain); Hassan Haziq; Abdullah Shahid; Mahes Silva; Neesham Nasir; Ismail Nihad; Mohamed Mahafooz; Husham Ibrahim; Ahmed Hassan; Mihusan Hamid; Ibrahim Hassan; Ahmed Faiz; Shafraz Jaleel (wk); Muaviath Ganee; Brendon Kuruppu (coach)

Myanmar	Qatar	Saudi Arabia	Thailand
Ye Myo Tun (captain); Aye Min Than; Sai Sai Wunna; Kyaw Min Aung; Zarn Thein; Myat Min Hein (wk); Win Maw; Myo Khaw; Khin Aye; Ya Naing Tun; Yen Wie; Kyaw Ze Za; Ye Min Soe; Aung Aung; Ashfaqul Islam (coach)	Umer Taj (captain); Tamoor Sajjad; Rusharat Ali; Zaheeruddin Ibrahim; Faisal Noor; Muhammad Rizlan; Awais Malik; Abbas Khan; Kamran Khan; Ali Ishtiaq; Jahangir Muhammad; Omran Hussein; Abbas Hussain; Habib Zada (wk); Shamsuddin Al Khadas (coach)	Shoaib Ali (captain); Hammad Saeed; Shafiq Ahmed; Hussain Anwar; Afzal Muhammad; Faiq Habib; Mohammad Abdullah; Faheem Afrad; Mohammad Thaib (wk); Amir Sajjad; Hassan Bukhari (wk); Umer Baig; Samar Hussain; Khurram Karamat; Asim Hussain (coach)	Zeeshan Khan (captain); Saurabh Dhanuka; Shyam Sideek; Noppon Seenamontri; Vichanath Singh; Mahasid Fahim; Witsanukorn Thapthimthai (wk); Daniel Leach; Mark Scully; Imran Gilani; Ryan Raina; Weerachai Maneerat; Robert Raina; Ziaul Hoque; Pemalal Fernando (coach)

== Group stages ==
=== Group A ===
Team	Pld	W	L	T	NR	NRR	Pts
Qatar	3	3	0	0	0	+2.64	6
Thailand	3	2	1	0	0	+0.47	4
Iran	3	1	2	0	0	−0.86	2
Myanmar	3	0	3	0	0	−4.16	0

4 December 2010
Scorecard

Iran; 174/8 (50 overs)	v	Thailand; 170 (45.4 overs)
Abdolvahab Ebrahimipour 36 (30); Noppon Seenamontri 2/32 (6 overs)		Saurabh Dhanuka 36 (79); Masood Jayezeh 3/29 (9.4 overs)

Match awarded to Thailand as Iran fielded two ineligible players
Asian Institute of Technology Ground, Bangkok
Umpires: Sri Ganesh Lakshminarayanan (Sin) and Naresh D'Souza (Kuw)

4 December 2010
Scorecard

Myanmar; 38 (26.4 overs)	v	Qatar; 39/1 (6.5 overs)
Khin Aye 6 (60); Omran Hussein 5/7 (7.4 overs)		Muhammad Rizlan 17* (22); Win Maw 1/11 (1.5 overs)

Qatar won by 9 wickets
Terdthai Cricket Ground, Bangkok
Umpires: Mithilesh Mishra (Sin) and Surinder Ghaley (Tha)
Player of the match: Omran Hussein (Qat)

5 December 2010
Scorecard

Myanmar; 90 (46.4 overs)	v	Thailand; 96/2 (18.3 overs)
Khin Aye 30 (101); Ziaul Hoque 5/23 (10 overs)		Shyam Sideek 35 (51); Aye Min Than 1/16 (5 overs)

Thailand won by 8 wickets
Terdthai Cricket Ground, Bangkok
Umpires: Mithilesh Mishra (Sin) and Sri Ganesh Lakshminarayanan (Sin)
Player of the match: Ziaul Hoque (Tha)

5 December 2010
Scorecard

Qatar; 187 (41.4 overs)	v	Iran; 31 (21.2 overs)
Rusharat Ali 60 (74); Abdolvahab Ebrahimipour 4/41 (8 overs)		Rashed Bameri 9 (61); Awais Malik 5/12 (7.2 overs)

Qatar won by 156 runs
Asian Institute of Technology Ground, Bangkok
Umpires: Surinder Pal Singh and Naresh D'Souza (Kuw)
Player of the match: Rusharat Ali (Qat)

7 December 2010
Scorecard

Myanmar; 117 (49.2 overs)	v	Iran; 118/0 (18.2 overs)
Ye Myo Tun 28 (110); Mohammad Siyasar 3/18 (7 overs)		Shirmohammad Balouchnezhad 74* (62)

Iran won by 10 wickets
Asian Institute of Technology Ground, Bangkok
Umpires: Surinder Pal Singh and Naresh D'Souza (Kuw)
Player of the match: Shirmohammad Balouchnezhad (Iran)

7 December 2010
Scorecard

Thailand; 101 (47.1 overs)	v	Qatar; 102/7 (30 overs)
Robert Raina 39 (33); Sajjad Quereshi 5/35 (10 overs)		Abbas Khan 27 (35); Robert Raina 3/27 (8 overs)

Qatar won by 3 wickets
Terdthai Cricket Ground, Bangkok
Umpires: Sri Ganesh Lakshminarayanan (Sin) and Mithilesh Mishra (Sin)
Player of the match: Sajjad Quereshi (Qat)

=== Group B ===
Team	Pld	W	L	T	NR	NRR	Pts
Saudi Arabia	3	3	0	0	0	+3.88	6
Maldives	3	2	1	0	0	+0.11	4
China	3	1	2	0	0	−1.57	2
Brunei	3	0	3	0	0	−2.84	0

4 December
Scorecard

Saudi Arabia; 283/9 (50 overs)	v	China; 49 all out (19 overs)
Amir Sajjad 81 (74); Zhang Yufei 3/65 (10 overs)		Jiang Shuyao 7 (17); Hussain Anwar 2/7 (2 overs)

Saudi Arabia won by 234 runs
Gymkhana Club, Chiang Mai
Umpires: Ashwini Kumar Rana (Tha) and Sanjay Sarda (Tha)
Player of the match: Amir Sajjad (Sau)

4 December 2010
Scorecard

Brunei; 117 (40 overs)	v	Maldives; 118/2 (12.3 overs)
Samantha Weerakoon 22 (63); Ahmed Faiz 2/19 (3 overs)		Moosa Kaleem 51* (40); Mohanan Santhosh 1/17 (2 overs)

Maldives won by 8 wickets
Prem Tinsulanonda International School, Chiang Mai
Umpires: Upul Kaluhetti (Tha) and I. Kamaruzzaman (Tha)
Player of the match: Abdullah Shahid (Mal)

5 December 2010
Scorecard

Maldives; 112 (33.2 overs)	v	China; 55 (21.5 overs)
Moosa Kaleem 40 (49); Zhang Peng 3/32 (8 overs)		Wang Dianyi 10 (5); Mohamed Mahafooz 4/8 (4.5 overs)

Maldives won by 57 runs
Gymkhana, Chiang Mai
Umpires: I.Kamaruzzaman (Tha) and Ashwini Kumar Rana (Tha)
Player of the match: Mohamed Mahafooz (Mal)

5 December 2010
Scorecard

Saudi Arabia; 355 (48.1 overs)	v	Brunei; 182 (36.2 overs)
Shoaib Ali 87 (79); Shorin Khan 2/33 (6 overs)		Samantha Weerakoon 42 (85); Hussain Bhatti 7/65 (10 overs)

Saudi Arabia won by 173 runs
Prem Tinsulanonda International School, Chiang Mai
Umpires: Sanjay Sarda (Tha) and Upul Kaluhetti (Tha)
Player of the match: Hussain Bhatti (Sau)

7 December 2010
Scorecard

China; 115 (27.5 overs)	v	Brunei; 59 (28.4 overs)
Zhang Qirui 37 (39); Jahaber Ali 6/28 (9.5 overs)		Basil George 12 (25); Sun Duo 4/15 (5 overs)

China won by 56 runs
Prem Tinsulanonda International School, Chiang Mai
Umpires: M. Kamruzzuman (Tha) and Sanjay Sarda (Tha)
Player of the match: Wang Lei (China)

7 December 2010
Scorecard

Saudi Arabia; 254/7 (45 overs)	v	Maldives; 98 (26.3 overs)
Muhammad Afzal 99* (98); Abdullah Shahid 2/48 (9 overs)		Moosa Kaleem 29 (31); Hussain Bhatti 3/7 (4 overs)

Saudi Arabia won by 156 runs
Gymkhana Club, Chiang Mai
Umpires: Upul Kaluhetti (Tha) and Ashwini Kumar Rana (Tha)
Player of the match: Muhammad Afzal (Sau)

== Semi-finals ==
9 December
Scorecard

Maldives; 210 (50 overs)	v	Qatar; 88 (31.1 overs)
Abdullah Shahid 77 (94); Omran Hussein 3/46 (10 overs)		Abbas Khan 24 (69); Abdullah Shahid 3/16 (6 overs)

Maldives won by 122 runs
Terdthai Cricket Ground, Bangkok
Umpires: Mohammad Kamruzzaman (Tha) and Upul Kaluhetti (Tha)
Player of the match: Abdullah Shahid (Mal)

9 December
Scorecard

Saudi Arabia; 223/9 (50 overs)	v	Thailand; 158/9 (50 overs)
Afzal Mohammad 103 (142); Noppon Senamontree 3/38 (6 overs)		Witsunakorn Thapthimthai 26 (53); Afzal Mohammad 2/23 (9 overs)

Saudi Arabia won by 65 runs
Asian Institute of Technology Ground, Bangkok
Umpires: Sri Ganesh Lakshminarayanan (Sin) and Naresh D'Souza (Kuw)
Player of the match: Afzal Mohammad (Sau)

== Play-offs ==
=== 7th place play-off ===
10 December
Scorecard

Myanmar; 178/9 (50 overs)	v	Brunei; 179/8 (38.4 overs)
Aung Aung 88* (91); Sujay Kamat 2/38 (10 overs)		Jahaberali Kyasuddin 62* (71); Khin Aye 4/44 (10 overs)

Brunei won by 2 wickets
Asian Institute of Technology Ground, Bangkok
Umpires: Upul Kaluhetti (Tha) and I.Kamaruzzaman (Tha)
Player of the match: Jahaberali Kyasuddin (Bru)

=== 5th place play-off ===
10 December
Scorecard

Iran; 55 (26.3 overs)	v	China; 38 (16.5 overs)
Rashid Bameri 19 (46); Wang Lei 3/11 (6 overs)		Jiang Shu Yao 7 (18); Naeim Bameri 4/12 (4 overs)

Iran won by 17 runs
Terdthai Cricket Ground, Bangkok
Umpires: Ashwini Rana (Tha) and Naresh D'Souza (Kuw)
Player of the match: Naeem Bameri (Ira)

=== 3rd place play-off ===
11 December
Scorecard

Qatar; 223 (48.4 overs)	v	Thailand; 107 (32 overs)
Umar Taj 52 (71); Noppon Senamontree 3/17 (6 overs)		Ryan Raina 59* (65); Mohammad Rizlan 4/25 (6 overs)

Qatar won by 116 runs
Asian Institute of Technology Ground, Bangkok
Umpires: Naresh D'Souza (Kuw) and Sri Ganesh Lakshminarayanan (Sin)
Player of the match: Muhammad Rizlan (Qat)

== Final ==
11 December
Scorecard

Saudi Arabia; 139 (43.3 overs)	v	Maldives; 140/9 (41.4 overs)
Shoaib Ali 39 (48); Ahmed Faiz 3/19 (8 overs)		Abdullah Shahid 30 (23); Shoaib Ali 5/25 (10 overs)

Maldives won by 1 wicket
Terdthai Cricket Ground, Bangkok
Umpires: Ashwini Rana (Tha) and Upul Kaluhetti (Tha)
Player of the match: Ismail Nihad (Mal)

== Final Placings ==
Pos	Team	Promotion/Relegation
1st	Maldives	Promoted to ACC Trophy Elite Division
2nd	Saudi Arabia	Promoted to ACC Trophy Elite Division
3rd	Qatar	Remain in ACC Trophy Challenge Division
4th	Thailand	Remain in ACC Trophy Challenge Division
5th	Iran	Remain in ACC Trophy Challenge Division
6th	China	Remain in ACC Trophy Challenge Division
7th	Brunei	Remain in ACC Trophy Challenge Division
8th	Myanmar	Remain in ACC Trophy Challenge Division

== Statistics ==
Most runs		Most wickets	
(Maldives) Moosa Kaleem	173	(Maldives) Abdullah Shahid	14
(Saudi Arabia) Shoaib Ali	164	(Qatar) Omran Hussein	12
(Saudi Arabia) Amir Sajjad	163	(Saudi Arabia) Shoaib Ali	11
(Maldives) Abdullah Shahid	161	(Saudi Arabia) Hussain Anwar	10
(Saudi Arabia) Afzal Muhammad	111	(Thailand) Ziaul Hoque	9
