= 2026 Men's T20 World Cup Asia Sub-regional Qualifier B =

Qualification tournament for the 2028 T20WC in Asia region

2026 ICC Men's T20 World Cup Asia Sub-regional Qualifier B
- Dates: 8 – 14 October 2026
- Administrator: ICC Asia
- Cricket format: Twenty20 International
- Tournament format: Round-robin
- Host: Malaysia
- Champions: Saudi Arabia
- Runners-up: Hong Kong
- Participants: 6
- Matches: 15
- Player of the series: (Malaysia) Virandeep Singh
- Most runs: (Saudi Arabia) Abdul Waheed (189)
- Most wickets: (Malaysia) Virandeep Singh (11)

The 2026 ICC Men's T20 World Cup Asia Sub-regional Qualifier B was a cricket tournament that formed part of the qualification process for the 2028 Men's T20 World Cup. It was hosted by Malaysia from 8 to 14 October 2026.

The top three sides from the tournament advanced to the regional final, where they will be joined by teams from sub-regional qualifier A.

== Squads ==
China	Hong Kong	Malaysia	Maldives	Saudi Arabia	Singapore
Tian Sen Qun (c); Du Jianhao; Meng Jianhao (wk); Du Jianyao (wk); Deng Jinqi; Yao Junting; Ma Qiancheng; Liu Qingze; Qi Shuai; Yang Wangjie; Chen Zhuo Ye; Zong Yuechao; Shenjian Zheng; Zhao Zhiling	Yasim Murtaza (c); Babar Hayat (vc); Zeeshan Ali (wk); Mohammad Ghazanfar; Ateeq Iqbal; Aizaz Khan; Ehsan Khan; Hassan Khan Mohammad; Nasrulla Rana; Anshuman Rath; Kinchit Shah; Reyansh Sharma; Ayush Shukla; Shahid Wasif (wk)	Syed Aziz (c); Muhammad Amir; Azri Azhar; Muhammad Akram; Aslam Khan; Prashant Madhukar; Sharvin Muniandy; Nazmus Sakib (wk); Pavandeep Singh; Virandeep Singh; Muhamad Syahadat; Vijay Unni; Muhammad Wafiq; Aqeel Wahid	Hassan Rasheed (c, wk); Azyan Farhath (vc); Mabsar Abdulla; Umar Adam; Ismail Ali; Harsha Amarasinghe; Sheraz Iqbal; Nazwan Ismail; Shafraz Jaleel (wk); Tharusha Kavinda; Ameel Mauroof; Mohamed Rishwan; Ibrahim Rizan; Ashan Yapa	Waji Ul Hassan (c); Zain Ul Abidin; Ishtiaq Ahmad; Manan Ali (wk); Muhammad Atif; Usman Khalid; Faisal Khan; Usman Najeeb; Sidharth Sankar (wk); Muhammad Saqib; Hisham Shaikh; Abdul Waheed; Abdul Wahid; Imran Yousaf	Manpreet Singh (c, wk); Jeevan Santhanam (vc); Surendran Chandramohan; Suryansh Gulecha; Girin Gune; Amartya Kaul; Riaan Naik; Akshay Puri; Chandramauli Sridev; Pranav Sudarshan; Daksh Tyagi; Harsh Venkatram; Aahan Vuthandam; Kabir Zandani (wk)

Harman Singh was not included in Singapore’s initial squad but went on to feature during the tournament.

== Points table ==
Qualifier B standings
Pos	Team	Pld	W	L	NR	Pts	NRR	Qualification
1	Saudi Arabia	5	5	0	0	10	3.147	Advanced to the regional final
2	Hong Kong	5	3	1	1	7	2.471	Advanced to the regional final
3	Malaysia (H)	5	3	2	0	6	2.506	Advanced to the regional final
4	Singapore	5	2	3	0	4	−0.670	Eliminated
5	Maldives	5	1	3	1	3	−2.390	Eliminated
6	China	5	0	5	0	0	−5.074	Eliminated

Source: Cricinfo
(H) Host

== Fixtures ==
8 October 2026
14:00
Scorecard

China; 96 (16.3 overs)	v	Maldives; 100/0 (10.1 overs)
Zong Yuechao 15 (15); Azyan Farhath 3/33 (4 overs)		Azyan Farhath 52* (33)

Maldives won by 10 wickets
Bayuemas Oval, Pandamaran
Umpires: Tabarak Dar (HK) and Viswanadan Kalidas (Mas)
Player of the match: Azyan Farhath (Mdv)

- China won the toss and elected to bat.
- Yao Junting, Liu Qingze (Chn), Harsha Amarasinghe, Sheraz Iqbal, Tharusha Kavinda and Ashan Yapa (Mdv) all made their T20I debuts.

8 October 2026
14:00
Scorecard

Saudi Arabia; 174/7 (20 overs)	v	Singapore; 99/7 (20 overs)
Abdul Waheed 54 (32); Daksh Tyagi 3/38 (4 overs)		Daksh Tyagi 18 (17); Usman Khalid 2/16 (3 overs)

Saudi Arabia won by 75 runs
UKM-YSD Cricket Oval, Bangi
Umpires: Aasif Iqbal (UAE) and Durga Subedi (Nep)
Player of the match: Abdul Waheed (Sau)

- Saudi Arabia won the toss and elected to bat.
- Muhammad Atif (Sau) made his T20I debut.

8 October 2026
14:00
Scorecard

Hong Kong; 140/5 (20 overs)	v	Malaysia; 72/5 (10 overs)
Zeeshan Ali 48 (38); Vijay Unni 3/16 (4 overs)		Syed Aziz 40 (21); Ayush Shukla 3/24 (3 overs)

Hong Kong won by 7 runs (DLS method)
Selangor Turf Club, Seri Kembangan
Umpires: Ahmed Shah Durrani (Afg) and Buddhi Pradhan (Nep)
Player of the match: Ayush Shukla (HK)

- Hong Kong won the toss and elected to bat.
- Malaysia were set a revised target of 80 runs in 10 overs due to rain.
- Reyansh Sharma (HK) made his T20I debut.

9 October 2026
14:00
Scorecard

Malaysia; 137/2 (20 overs)	v	Saudi Arabia; 139/7 (19.1 overs)
Virandeep Singh 61* (53); Ishtiaq Ahmad 1/18 (4 overs)		Abdul Waheed 67* (44); Virandeep Singh 3/15 (4 overs)

Saudi Arabia won by 3 wickets
Bayuemas Oval, Pandamaran
Umpires: Ahmed Shah Durrani (Afg) and Durga Subedi (Nep)
Player of the match: Abdul Waheed (Sau)

- Malaysia won the toss and elected to bat.

9 October 2026
14:00
Scorecard

China; 40 (13.2 overs)	v	Hong Kong; 41/2 (3.4 overs)
Zong Yuechao 15 (27); Ehsan Khan 3/5 (3.2 overs)		Anshuman Rath 20 (7); Ma Qiancheng 1/8 (1 over)

Hong Kong won by 8 wickets
UKM-YSD Cricket Oval, Bangi
Umpires: Aasif Iqbal (UAE) and Viswanadan Kalidas (Mas)
Player of the match: Ehsan Khan (HK)

- China won the toss and elected to bat.

9 October 2026
14:00
Scorecard

Singapore; 188/6 (20 overs)	v	Maldives; 155/7 (20 overs)
Surendran Chandramohan 105 (61); Harsha Amarasinghe 2/37 (4 overs)		Sheraz Iqbal 40 (34); Jeevan Santhanam 2/28 (4 overs)

Singapore won by 33 runs
Selangor Turf Club, Seri Kembangan
Umpires: Tabarak Dar (HK) and Ahmad Shah Pakteen (Afg)
Player of the match: Surendran Chandramohan (Sin)

- Singapore won the toss and elected to bat.
- Kabir Zandani (Sin) made his T20I debut.

11 October 2026
09:15
Scorecard

Saudi Arabia; 168/6 (20 overs)	v	Hong Kong; 158 (19.3 overs)
Abdul Waheed 67 (46); Ehsan Khan 1/20 (3 overs)		Reyansh Sharma 71* (48); Ishtiaq Ahmad 4/25 (4 overs)

Saudi Arabia won by 10 runs
Bayuemas Oval, Pandamaran
Umpires: Buddhi Pradhan (Nep) and Narayanan Sivan (Mas)
Player of the match: Ishtiaq Ahmad (Sau)

- Hong Kong won the toss and elected to field.
- Ishtiaq Ahmad (Sau) took his first hat-trick in T20Is.

11 October 2026
09:15
Scorecard

Maldives; 125/9 (20 overs)	v	Malaysia; 127/4 (8.5 overs)
Sheraz Iqbal 47 (36); Pavandeep Singh 4/13 (4 overs)		Syed Aziz 57 (18); Umar Adam 3/43 (4 overs)

Malaysia won by 6 wickets
UKM-YSD Cricket Oval, Bangi
Umpires: Ahmed Shah Durrani (Afg) and Morshed Ali Khan (Ban)
Player of the match: Pavandeep Singh (Mas)

- Malaysia won the toss and elected to field.

11 October 2026
09:15
Scorecard

Singapore; 139 (20 overs)	v	China; 89/6 (20 overs)
Riaan Naik 46 (29); Tian Sen Qun 3/23 (3 overs)		Du Jianhao 32 (44); Manpreet Singh 3/4 (3 overs)

Singapore won by 50 runs
Selangor Turf Club, Seri Kembangan
Umpires: Tabarak Dar (HK) and Aasif Iqbal (UAE)
Player of the match: Manpreet Singh (Sin)

- China won the toss and elected to field.
- Harman Singh (Sin) made his T20I debut.

12 October 2026
09:15
Scorecard

Malaysia; 149/5 (20 overs)	v	Singapore; 112 (19 overs)
Virandeep Singh 65* (52); Harsh Venkatram 2/23 (2 overs)		Suryansh Gulecha 32 (27); Virandeep Singh 5/14 (4 overs)

Malaysia won by 37 runs
Bayuemas Oval, Pandamaran
Umpires: Aasif Iqbal (UAE) and Buddhi Pradhan (Nep)
Player of the match: Virandeep Singh (Mas)

- Singapore won the toss and elected to field.
- Virandeep Singh (Mas) took his first five-wicket haul in T20Is.

12 October 2026
09:15
Scorecard

Hong Kong; 104/3 (13 overs)	v	Maldives
Shahid Wasif 55* (34); Umar Adam 2/26 (4 overs)

No result
UKM-YSD Cricket Oval, Bangi
Umpires: Ahmed Shah Durrani (Afg) and Durga Subedi (Nep)

- Maldives won the toss and elected to field.
- No further play was possible due to rain.

12 October 2026
09:15
Scorecard

Saudi Arabia; 98/6 (10 overs)	v	China; 34/8 (10 overs)
Waji Ul Hassan 49 (27); Tian Sen Qun 3/22 (2 overs)		Tian Sen Qun 13* (22); Hisham Shaikh 2/2 (2 overs)

Saudi Arabia won by 64 runs
Selangor Turf Club, Seri Kembangan
Umpires: Viswanadan Kalidas (Mas) and Ramasamy Venkatesh (HK)
Player of the match: Usman Khalid (Sau)

- China won the toss and elected to field.
- The match was reduced to 10 overs per side due to rain.

14 October 2026
09:15
Scorecard

China; 60 (20 overs)	v	Malaysia; 63/4 (7.2 overs)
Du Jianyao 14* (38); Syed Aziz 4/8 (4 overs)		Aslam Khan 27 (15); Ma Qiancheng 2/21 (3 overs)

Malaysia won by 6 wickets
Bayuemas Oval, Pandamaran
Umpires: Aasif Iqbal (UAE) and Ahmad Shah Pakteen (Afg)
Player of the match: Syed Aziz (Mas)

- Malaysia won the toss and elected to field.

14 October 2026
14:00
Scorecard

Hong Kong; 172/5 (20 overs)	v	Singapore; 134 (18 overs)
Anshuman Rath 95* (56); Manpreet Singh 3/22 (4 overs)		Manpreet Singh 69 (40); Ehsan Khan 5/26 (4 overs)

Hong Kong won by 38 runs
Bayuemas Oval, Pandamaran
Umpires: Aasif Iqbal (UAE) and Buddhi Pradhan (Nep)
Player of the match: Ehsan Khan (HK)

- Hong Kong won the toss and elected to bat.
- Aahan Vuthandam (Sin) made his T20I debut.
- Ehsan Khan (HK) took his first hat-trick in T20Is.

14 October 2026
14:00
Scorecard

Saudi Arabia; 194/5 (20 overs)	v	Maldives; 69 (17.1 overs)
Muhammad Atif 100* (58); Sheraz Iqbal 2/24 (2 overs)		Azyan Farhath 18 (17); Muhammad Atif 4/11 (3 overs)

Saudi Arabia won by 125 runs
UKM-YSD Cricket Oval, Bangi
Umpires: Ahmed Shah Durrani (Afg) and Ramasamy Venkatesh (HK)
Player of the match: Muhammad Atif (Sau)

- Saudi Arabia won the toss and elected to bat.

== See also ==
- 2026 Men's T20 World Cup Asia Sub-regional Qualifier A
