= 2018 ACC Eastern Region T20 =

- Dates: 21 – 25 February 2018
- Cricket format: Twenty20
- Tournament format(s): Round Robin, Final
- Host: Thailand
- Champions: Bhutan
- Runners-up: Thailand
- Participants: 4
- Matches: 8
- Player of the series: (Bhutan) Jigme Singye
- Most runs: (Thailand) Daniel Jacobs (112)
- Most wickets: (Bhutan) Suprit Pradhan (7)

The 2018 ACC Eastern Region T20 was a Twenty20 (T20) cricket tournament held in Thailand from 21 to 25 February 2018. The four participating teams in the first edition of this new event were the national sides of Bhutan, China, Myanmar and hosts Thailand. The matches were all played at the Terdthai Cricket Ground in Bangkok. Matches did not have Twenty20 International status, but matches played in future editions will following the decision of the ICC to grant full Twenty20 International status to all its members from 1 January 2019. The first day's action saw comfortable wins for Bhutan and Thailand over China and Myanmar, respectively. Thailand secured a place in the final by defeating Bhutan on day two, following on from China's win against Myanmar. The third day was lost due to rain with both scheduled matches abandoned, which meant that Bhutan joined Thailand in the final. The final day's play-offs saw Myanmar edge past China by five runs to claim third place, and then Bhutan defeat Thailand by three runs to take the title.

Bhutan's captain Jigme Singye was named as player of the tournament, fellow Bhutanese player Suprit Pradhan was named bowler of the tournament, and the best batsman award was given to Thailand's captain Daniel Jacobs.

== Squads ==
Bhutan	China	Myanmar	Thailand
Jigme Singye (c); Thinley Jamtsho (vc); Manoj Adhikari; Sanjeevan Gurung; Dorji Khandu; Kesang Nima; Rekash Pradhan; Suprit Pradhan; Tobden Singye; Kumar Subba; Ugyen Tenzin; Tandin Wangchuk; Tenzin Wangchuk; Tenzin Wangchuk, jnr	Lu Cangcang; Gao Guohao; Li Jian; Han Junhui; Hou Rui; Tian Suqing; Zhang Yong; Feng Yu; Zhang Yufei; Song Yulin; Chen Zhuoyue; Wang Zihao	Htet Lin Aung (c); Thuya Aung; Ye Ko Ko Aung; Khin Aye; Paing Danu; Aung Ko Ko; Swann Htet Ko Ko; Yan Naing Kyaw; Htet Lin Oo; Nyeing Cham Soe; Ko Ko Lin Thu; Ye Naing Tun; Min Wai; Sei Htet Wai	Daniel Jacobs (c); Mahsid Faheem; Sittipong Hongsi; Chanchai Pengkumta; Rayan Raina; Robert Raina; Suwat Rastanaumnuaykool; Kamron Senamontree; Nopphon Senamontree; Sarbjot Singh; Vichanath Singh; Payuputh Sungnard; Kiatiwut Suttisan; Wanchana Uisuk

== Round-robin ==
=== Points table ===
Team	P	W	L	T	NR	Pts	NRR	Status
Thailand (H)	3	2	0	0	1	5	+4.350	Advanced to the final
Bhutan	3	1	1	0	1	3	+0.050	Advanced to the final
Myanmar	3	1	1	0	1	3	–2.628	Advanced to the 3rd place play-off
China	3	0	2	0	1	1	–2.662	Advanced to the 3rd place play-off

=== Matches ===
Summaries and player of the match winners, along with downloadable scorecards, can be found on the ACC website.

21 February 2018
10:00
Scorecard

China; 73 (19.4 overs)	v	Bhutan; 74/1 (10.1 overs)
Lu Cangcang 35* (59); Thinley Jamtsho 3/14 (3.4 overs)		Suprit Pradhan 32* (33); Zhang Yufei 1/27 (3 overs)

Bhutan won by 9 wickets
Terdthai Cricket Ground, Bangkok
Umpires: Arif Ansar (Tha) and Tauseef Khalid (Tha)
Player of the match: Thinley Jamtsho (Bhu)

- China won the toss and elected to bat.

21 February 2018
14:00
Scorecard

Thailand; 177/5 (20 overs)	v	Myanmar; 47 (18 overs)
Daniel Jacobs 41 (43); Khin Aye 2/23 (3 overs)		Ye Naing Tun 15 (15); Payuputh Sungnard 3/12 (4 overs)

Thailand won by 130 runs
Terdthai Cricket Ground, Bangkok
Umpires: Aye Mine (Tha) and Ashwani Kumar Rana (Tha)
Player of the match: Chanchai Pengkumta (Tha)

- Thailand won the toss and elected to bat.

22 February 2018
10:00
Scorecard

China; 79/9 (20 overs)	v	Myanmar; 80/6 (13.4 overs)
Li Jian 12 (12); Aung Ko Ko 4/17 (4 overs)		Ye Naing Tun 20 (16); Han Junhui 2/14 (3 overs)

Myanmar won by 4 wickets
Terdthai Cricket Ground, Bangkok
Umpires: Samad Akbar (Tha) and Arif Ansar (Tha)
Player of the match: Aung Ko Ko (Mya)

- Myanmar won the toss and elected to field.

22 February 2018
14:00
Scorecard

Thailand; 108 (19.5 overs)	v	Bhutan; 64 (18.5 overs)
Sittipong Honsi 27 (24); Tobden Singye 3/7 (1.5 overs)		Suprit Pradhan 23 (35); Vichanath Singh 4/7 (3.5 overs)

Thailand won by 44 runs
Terdthai Cricket Ground, Bangkok
Umpires: Aye Mine (Tha) and Ashwani Kumar Rana (Tha)
Player of the match: Ryan Raina (Tha)

- Bhutan won the toss and elected to field.

24 February 2018
10:00
Scorecard

Thailand	v	China

Match abandoned
Terdthai Cricket Ground, Bangkok
Umpires: Arif Ansar (Tha) and Ashwani Kumar Rana (Tha)

- No toss.
- No play was possible due to rain.

24 February 2018
14:00
Scorecard

Bhutan	v	Myanmar

Match abandoned
Terdthai Cricket Ground, Bangkok
Umpires: Samad Akbar (Tha) and Tauseef Khalid (Tha)

- No toss.
- No play was possible due to rain.

== Play-offs ==
=== Third-place play-off ===
25 February 2018
10:00
Scorecard

Myanmar; 93 (20 overs)	v	China; 88/6 (20 overs)
Khin Aye 22 (29); Li Jian 4/14 (4 overs)		Zhang Yufei 44 (51); Htet Aung 2/28 (4 overs)

Myanmar won by 5 runs
Terdthai Cricket Ground, Bangkok
Umpires: Arif Ansar (Tha) and Tauseef Khalid (Tha)
Player of the match: Li Jian (Chn)

- China won the toss and elected to field.

=== Final ===
25 February 2018
14:00
Scorecard

Bhutan; 101/9 (20 overs)	v	Thailand; 98/9 (20 overs)
Thinley Jamtsho 31 (21); Robert Raina 3/14 (2 overs)		Daniel Jacobs 48 (48); Suprit Pradhan 3/8 (4 overs)

Bhutan won by 3 runs
Terdthai Cricket Ground, Bangkok
Umpires: Aye Mine (Tha) and Ashwani Kumar Rana (Tha)
Player of the match: Jigme Singye (Bhu)

- Bhutan won the toss and elected to bat.
