= Brunei Darussalam National Cricket Association =

Governing body of cricket in Brunei

Brunei Darussalam National Cricket Association was the official governing body of the sport of cricket in Brunei. Until it had its membership revoked in 2015, the organisation was Brunei's representative at the International Cricket Council, having been granted affiliate membership in 1992. It organised the Brunei national cricket team, which mainly participated in the Asian Cricket Council tournaments.
