= Jandre Coetzee =

South African cricketer (born 1984)

Personal information
- Born: 15 January 1984 (age 42); Springbok, South Africa
- Batting: Left-handed
- Bowling: Left-arm medium

International information
- National side: Thailand
- T20I debut (cap 30): 27 July 2023 v China
- Last T20I: 11 May 2025 v Japan

Domestic team information
- Years: Team
- Griqualand
- Source: Cricinfo, 7 October 2025

Jandre Coetzee (born 15 January 1984) is a South African cricketer who plays first-class cricket for Griqualand West and international cricket for the Thailand national cricket team. A left-arm medium bowler, he made his first class debut in 2004–05 and in his 3 seasons has taken 92 wickets at 24.51 with best innings bowling figures of 7/42. He was included in the Griqualand West cricket team for the 2015 Africa T20 Cup.
