= List of Thailand Twenty20 International cricketers =

This is a list of Thai Twenty20 International cricketers.

In April 2018, the ICC decided to grant full Twenty20 International (T20I) status to all its members. Therefore, all Twenty20 matches played between Thailand and other ICC members after 1 January 2019 will have T20I status.

This list comprises all members of the Thailand cricket team who have played at least one T20I match. It is initially arranged in the order in which each player won his first Twenty20 cap. Where more than one player won his first Twenty20 cap in the same match, those players are listed alphabetically by surname. Thailand played their first match with T20I status on 24 June against Malaysia.

== Key ==
General

- ‡ – Captain
- † – Wicket-keeper
- First – Year of debut
- Last – Year of latest game
- Mat – Number of matches played

Batting

- Runs – Runs scored in career
- HS – Highest score
- Avg – Runs scored per dismissal
- * – Batsman remained not out
- 50 – Half-centuries scored

Bowling

- Balls – Balls bowled in career
- Wkt – Wickets taken in career
- BBI – Best bowling in an innings
- Ave – Average runs per wicket

Fielding

- Ca – Catches taken
- St – Stumpings affected

== List of players ==
Statistics are correct as of 14 October 2026.

Thailand T20I cricketers
General					Batting				Bowling				Fielding		Ref
No.	Name	First	Last	Mat	Runs	HS	Avg	50	Balls	Wkt	BBI	Ave	Ca	St	Ref
1	Anowarul Islam	2019	2019	4	15	9	3.75	0	18	0	–	–	3	0	
2	Mahsid Faheem	2019	2020	7	3	2	1.00	0	120	8	2/11	16.62	1	0	
3	Ziaul Hoque	2019	2020	7	95	23*	15.83	0	126	4	1/13	30.50	2	0	
4	Daniel Jacobs	2019	2024	9	102	28	11.33	0	30	4	4/13	6.50	2	0	
5	Henno Jordaan	2019	2020	8	166	37*	23.71	0	–	–	–	–	1	0	
6	Md Shafiqul Haque†	2019	2019	4	88	38	22.00	0	18	1	1/25	25.00	1	2	
7	Naveed Pathan	2019	2020	8	149	54*	21.28	1	46	3	1/11	26.33	0	0	
8	Chanchai Pengkumta‡	2019	2026	43	204	31*	7.84	0	604	34	4/22	19.97	7	0	
9	Kamron Senamontree	2019	2026	33	65	13*	4.64	0	463	28	4/7	17.96	12	0	
10	Kiatiwut Suttisan	2019	2025	8	150	73	18.75	1	–	–	–	–	4	0	
11	Vichanath Singh‡	2019	2023	15	71	18	7.88	0	261	9	2/10	26.66	5	0	
12	Sittipong Hongsi	2019	2023	5	32	11*	16.00	0	30	2	1/11	33.50	0	0	
13	Nicholas Janes	2019	2019	2	9	9	4.50	0	6	0	–	–	0	0	
14	Sorawat Desungnoen	2020	2026	45	418	42	11.29	0	390	16	2/18	29.68	16	0	
15	Phiriyapong Suanchuai†	2020	2026	37	296	37	9.86	0	–	–	–	–	9	5	
16	Robert Raina	2020	2024	15	110	42	12.22	0	144	16	3/3	9.06	6	0	
17	Nopphon Senamontree‡	2020	2026	65	215	17*	10.23	0	1,333	87	5/10	14.10	10	0	
18	Wanchana Uisuk	2020	2020	4	11	5	2.75	0	24	0	–	–	1	0	
19	Ismail Sardar	2020	2020	2	5	3	2.50	0	–	–	–	–	0	0	
20	Thanadon Buri	2022	2026	3	2	2	2.00	0	42	5	2/9	4.40	0	0	
21	Chaloemwong Chatphaisan†	2022	2026	67	794	70*	12.80	2	135	8	1/5	17.75	31	0	
22	Khanitson Namchaikul	2022	2024	18	11	5*	2.75	0	233	12	4/7	21.50	4	0	
23	Narawit Nuntarach	2022	2025	43	215	24	6.71	0	239	12	3/24	27.33	17	0	
24	Jeerasak Pakhiaokajee	2022	2022	6	31	22*	7.25	0	–	–	–	–	2	0	
25	Yodsak Saranonnakkun	2022	2026	50	312	25	7.60	0	18	0	–	–	17	0	
26	Phanuphong Thongsa	2022	2026	32	212	29*	12.47	0	258	27	4/2	9.11	11	0	
27	Thanaphon Yotharat	2022	2025	6	10	6*	–	0	60	3	1/2	19.66	1	0	
28	Panuwat Desungnoen	2022	2024	4	17	14	5.66	0	54	1	1/18	83.00	1	0	
29	Satarut Rungrueang	2023	2026	28	156	46	7.80	0	–	–	–	–	10	0	
30	Jandre Coetzee	2023	2026	26	378	45*	22.23	0	512	44	5/10	9.18	4	0	
31	Sarawut Maliwan	2023	2026	44	28	5*	2.80	0	707	38	4/20	21.63	12	0	
32	Akshaykumar Yadav‡†	2023	2026	50	1,209	93*	30.22	7	–	–	–	–	24	7	
33	Anucha Kalasi	2023	2025	12	14	8*	7.00	0	222	12	2/9	14.75	2	0	
34	Austin Lazarus‡	2024	2026	46	894	95	24.83	5	157	5	2/2	33.80	27	0	
35	Mukesh Thakur	2024	2026	25	183	49	12.20	0	482	26	4/23	18.65	4	0	
36	Wiraphan Ngowhuad	2024	2026	13	6	3	1.50	0	193	17	4/23	18.35	1	0	
37	Nitish Salekar	2024	2025	12	128	33	11.63	0	228	10	2/7	26.70	5	0	
38	Pattarapol Jirapatananukul	2026	2026	9	97	45	13.85	0	42	3	2/33	13.66	3	0	
39	Phatummakan Donkaew	2026	2026	5	1	1	1.00	0	45	4	2/0	4.75	2	0	
40	Aruesanan Wichakam	2026	2026	5	10	10	3.33	0	54	2	2/29	26.50	0	0	
