= List of Myanmar Twenty20 International cricketers =

This is a list of Myanmar Twenty20 International cricketers.

In April 2018, the ICC decided to grant full Twenty20 International (T20I) status to all its members. Therefore, all Twenty20 matches played between Myanmar and other ICC members after 1 January 2019 will be eligible to have T20I status. Myanmar played their first matches with T20I status during the 2023 T20 World Cup Asia Qualifier B in Kuala Lumpur in July 2023.

This list comprises all members of the Myanmar cricket team who have played at least one T20I match for the country. It is initially arranged in the order in which each player won his first Twenty20 cap. Where more than one player won his first Twenty20 cap in the same match, those players are listed alphabetically by surname.

== Key ==
General

- ‡ – Captain
- † – Wicket-keeper
- First – Year of debut
- Last – Year of latest game
- Mat – Number of matches played

Batting

- Runs – Runs scored in career
- HS – Highest score
- 50 – Half-centuries scored
- 100 – Centuries scored
- Avg – Runs scored per dismissal
- * – Batsman remained not out

Bowling

- Balls – Balls bowled in career
- Wkt – Wickets taken in career
- BBI – Best bowling in an innings
- Ave – Average runs per wicket

Fielding

- Ca – Catches taken
- St – Stumpings affected

== List of players ==
Statistics are correct as of 14 October 2026.

Myanmar T20I cricketers
Cap	Name	First	Last	Mat	Batting				Bowling				Fielding		Ref(s)
Cap	Name	First	Last	Mat	Runs	HS	Avg	50	Balls	Wkt	BBI	Ave	Ca	St	Ref(s)
1	Aung Ko Ko	2023	2026	18	30	10*	3.75	0	95	5	2/10	19.20	0	0	
2	Khin Aye	2023	2026	37	203	24*	7.25	0	216	9	2/5	34.16	12	0	
3	Htet Lin Aung‡	2023	2026	35	220	21*	7.09	0	372	19	3/16	22.26	10	0	
4	Htet Lin Oo	2023	2026	33	225	38*	10.71	0	156	10	4/10	22.50	7	0	
5	Ko Ko Lin Thu	2023	2026	38	344	71	10.11	1	444	21	3/7	20.33	12	0	
6	Ye Naing Tun‡†	2023	2026	17	115	25	8.21	0	–	–	–	–	6	1	
7	Nay Lin Htun	2023	2025	17	46	11*	5.11	0	–	–	–	–	3	0	
8	Paing Danu	2023	2026	25	292	72*	12.69	1	378	20	3/16	20.70	8	0	
9	Pyae Phyo Wai	2023	2026	38	442	52	12.27	1	529	25	3/20	22.60	13	0	
10	Swann Htet Ko Ko†	2023	2025	22	77	11	5.50	0	–	–	–	–	10	3	
11	Thuya Aung‡	2023	2025	32	305	37	10.89	0	364	19	3/7	19.31	6	1	
12	Nyein Cham Soe	2023	2026	33	90	27	6.00	0	252	19	3/12	17.78	8	0	
13	Myat Thu Aung	2023	2025	22	74	18	10.57	0	36	4	2/5	10.25	8	0	
14	Lwin Maw	2024	2024	2	3	3	3.00	0	–	–	–	–	0	0	
15	Saw Aung	2024	2024	4	0	0*	0.00	0	6	1	1/17	17.00	2	0	
16	Hein Zin Aung	2024	2024	1	0	0	0.00	0	6	1	–	–	0	0	
17	Sai Hla Htwe	2025	2026	11	20	10*	6.66	0	80	3	2/12	27.66	0	0	
18	Kaung Htet Kyaw	2025	2026	14	11	4	2.75	0	168	6	2/14	34.00	0	0	
19	Htun Myat Hei†	2025	2025	2	–	–	–	–	–	–	–	–	0	1	
20	Paing Win	2025	2025	3	–	–	–	–	30	2	2/8	13.00	0	0	
21	Kaung Ko Ko†	2025	2025	2	4	3	4.00	0	–	–	–	–	1	2	
22	Zwe Htet Paing	2025	2025	3	3	3*	3.00	0	12	1	1/21	30.00	0	0	
23	Ye Ko Ko	2025	2025	1	–	–	–	–	24	2	2/28	14.00	0	0	
24	Kyaw Zin Lin	2025	2025	4	8	4	2.66	0	–	–	–	–	0	0	
25	Nay Lin Htike	2025	2025	2	4	3	4.00	0	–	–	–	–	0	0	
26	Nay Lin Htet	2025	2025	2	8	7	4.00	0	–	–	–	–	0	0	
