= List of Iran Twenty20 International cricketers =

This is a list of Iranian Twenty20 International cricketers.

In April 2018, the ICC decided to grant full Twenty20 International (T20I) status to all its members. Therefore, all Twenty20 matches played between Iran and other ICC members after 1 January 2019 have the T20I status. Iran's first T20I was played against the UAE on 23 February 2020 during the 2020 ACC Western Region T20.

This list comprises names of all members of the Iranian cricket team who have played at least one T20I match. It is initially arranged in the order in which each player won his first Twenty20 cap. Where more than one player won his first Twenty20 cap in the same match, those players are listed alphabetically by surname.

== Key ==
General

- ‡ – Captain
- † – Wicket-keeper
- First – Year of debut
- Last – Year of latest game
- Mat – Number of matches played

Batting

- Runs – Runs scored in career
- HS – Highest score
- Avg – Runs scored per dismissal
- * – Batsman remained not out
- 50 – Number of half centuries

Bowling

- Balls – Balls bowled in career
- Wkt – Wickets taken in career
- BBI – Best bowling in an innings
- Ave – Average runs per wicket

Fielding

- Ca – Catches taken
- St – Stumpings affected

== List of players ==
Statistics are correct as of 25 February 2020.

Iran T20I cricketers
General					Batting				Bowling				Fielding		Ref
No.	Name	First	Last	Mat	Runs	HS	Avg	50	Balls	Wkt	BBI	Ave	Ca	St	Ref
1	Ali Mohammadipour	2020	2020	3	41	19	20.50	0	–	–	–	–	0	0	
2	Arshad Mazarzei†	2020	2020	3	7	5	2.33	0	–	–	–	–	1	0	
3	Dad Dahani‡	2020	2020	3	7	4	2.33	0	–	–	–	–	1	0	
4	Emran Shahbakhsh	2020	2020	3	2	2*	1.00	0	5	0	–	–	1	0	
5	Hamid Hashemi	2020	2020	1	–	–	–	–	–	–	–	–	0	0	
6	Masood Jayezeh	2020	2020	3	2	1	0.66	0	18	0	–	–	0	0	
7	Nader Zahadiafzal	2020	2020	3	12	12	4.00	0	24	1	1/10	25.00	0	0	
8	Naiem Bameri	2020	2020	3	20	10	6.66	0	48	1	1/14	73.00	0	0	
9	Navid Balouch	2020	2020	3	30	19*	15.00	0	12	0	–	–	0	0	
10	Navid Abdollahpour	2020	2020	2	0	0*	–	0	30	1	1/24	45.00	0	0	
11	Yousef Shadzehisarjou	2020	2020	3	73	39	24.33	0	–	–	–	–	0	0	
12	Adel Kolasangiani	2020	2020	1	2	2*	–	0	6	0	–	–	0	0	
13	Mehran Dorri	2020	2020	1	0	0*	–	0	–	–	–	–	0	0	
14	Mehran Siasar	2020	2020	1	0	0	0.00	0	–	–	–	–	0	0	
