= Myanmar Cricket Federation =

Governing body of cricket in Myanmar

- Sport: Cricket
- Jurisdiction: National
- Affiliation: International Cricket Council (ICC)
- (Myanmar)

Myanmar Cricket Federation is the official governing body of the sport of cricket in Myanmar. Myanmar Cricket Federation is Myanmar's representative at the International Cricket Council and is an associate member and has been a member of that body since 2006. It is also a member of the Asian Cricket Council. The federation controls the national cricket team.
