= 2027 Men's T20 World Cup Asia Regional Final =

Qualifying tournament for the 2028 T20WC

2027 ICC Men's T20 World Cup Asia Regional Final
- Dates: TBD – 2027
- Administrator: Asian Cricket Council
- Cricket format: Round-robin
- Tournament format: Twenty20 International
- Host: TBD
- Participants: 6

The 2027 ICC Men's T20 World Cup Asia Regional Final will be a cricket tournament that will form part of the qualification process for the 2028 Men's T20 World Cup. The top two teams will join Nepal, Oman and the United Arab Emirates as Asia's representatives at the 2028 Men's T20 World Cup Global Qualifier.

India, Pakistan and Sri Lanka qualified directly for the World Cup as three of the top eight teams from the previous edition, while Afghanistan and Bangladesh qualified directly through ICC Men's T20I Team Rankings.

== Teams and qualification ==
The tournament will feature six teams, consisting of the top three sides from each sub-regional qualifier.

Method of qualification	Date	Venue(s)	No. of teams	Qualified teams
Asia Qualifier A	14 October 2026	Malaysia	3	Bahrain
Asia Qualifier A	14 October 2026	Malaysia	3	Kuwait
Asia Qualifier A	14 October 2026	Malaysia	3	Qatar
Asia Qualifier B	14 October 2026	Malaysia	3	Hong Kong
Asia Qualifier B	14 October 2026	Malaysia	3	Malaysia
Asia Qualifier B	14 October 2026	Malaysia	3	Saudi Arabia
Total			6	

== Squads ==
Bahrain	Hong Kong	Kuwait	Malaysia	Qatar	Saudi Arabia

== Points table ==
Regional final standings
Pos	Team	Pld	W	L	NR	Pts	NRR	Qualification
1	Bahrain	0	0	0	0	0	—	Advance to the global qualifier
2	Hong Kong	0	0	0	0	0	—	Advance to the global qualifier
3	Kuwait	0	0	0	0	0	—	
4	Malaysia	0	0	0	0	0	—	
5	Qatar	0	0	0	0	0	—	
6	Saudi Arabia	0	0	0	0	0	—	

First match(es) will be played: unknown. Source:
