= Iran national cricket team =

National cricket team

Iran
- Association: Islamic Republic of Iran Cricket Association

International Cricket Council
- ICC status: Associate member (2017)
- ICC region: Asia

International cricket
- First international: 13 June 2004 v Bhutan at Kelab Aman, Kuala Lumpur, Malaysia

T20 Internationals
- First T20I: v United Arab Emirates at Al Amerat Cricket Stadium Turf 2, Muscat; 23 February 2020
- Last T20I: v Kuwait at Al Amerat Cricket Stadium Turf 2, Muscat; 25 February 2020
T20Is	Played	Won/Lost
Total	3	0/3 (0 ties, 0 no results)
This year	0	0/0 (0 ties, 0 no results)
- As of 1 January 2024

The Iran national cricket team (Persian: تیم ملی کریکت ایران) is a cricket team representing Iran in international cricket. They became an affiliate member of the International Cricket Council (ICC) in 2003 and an associate member in 2017.

== History ==
Cricket was introduced in Iran in the 1920s and 1930s by the British who were working in the oil industry but it ceased when the oil industry was nationalised in 1951. Cricket was reintroduced in the early 1990s by Iranians who had studied abroad. Iran joined the Asian Cricket Council in 2003. Iran's men's cricket league was established in 2014 with eight teams as participants and Chah Bahar became the first winners. In the same year, women's cricket league was also established which was won by Mashhad.

Following their admission to the International Cricket Council, they made their international debut at the 2004 ACC Trophy, and played again in the 2006 tournament. On both occasions, they failed to progress beyond the first round. With the separation of the ACC Trophy into Elite and Challenge divisions, following their performance at the 2006 ACC Trophy Iran have since competed in the Challenge divisions in both 2009 and in the 2010 competition, finishing in the firth place on both occasions.

=== 2018–present ===
In April 2018, the ICC decided to grant full Twenty20 International (T20I) status to all its members. Therefore, all Twenty20 matches played between Iran and other ICC members after 1 January 2019 have the full T20I status.

Iran played their first T20I against UAE on 23 February 2020 during the 2020 ACC Western Region T20.

As of 1 January 2024, Iran is ranked 106th in T20I Rankings by the ICC.

23 February 2020
09:30
Scorecard

Iran; 61/8 (20 overs)	v	United Arab Emirates; 62/0 (5.3 overs)
Yousef Shadzehisarjou 14 (21); Rohan Mustafa 2/6 (4 overs)		Rohan Mustafa 41* (18)

United Arab Emirates won by 10 wickets
Al Amerat Cricket Stadium Turf 2, Muscat
Umpires: Riyaz Kurupkar (Qat) and Imran Mustafa (Kuw)
Player of the match: Rohan Mustafa (UAE)

- United Arab Emirates won the toss and elected to field.
- First ever T20I match for Iran.

== Team colours ==
Iran's kits vary from year to year; the team have worn kits in green color, at times red kits and also grey kits. The kits always have 'Iran' written on the front of the jersey; usually Iran's cricket logo and at times sponsor logos also appear.

== Tournament history ==
=== Asia Cup Qualifier ===
- 2018: Did not participate
- 2020: Did not qualify

=== ACC Western Region T20 ===
- 2019: Did not play
- 2020: Group stage

=== ACC Trophy Challenge Competitions ===
Host/Year	Round/Rank
(Malaysia) 2004 Trophy	1st round
(Malaysia) 2006 Trophy	1st round
(Thailand) 2009 Challenge	5th place
(Thailand) 2010 Challenge	5th place
(Thailand) 2012 Challenge	5th place
(Thailand) 2023 Challenger	Group Stage

=== ACC Middle East Cup ===
Host/Year	Round/Rank
(Kuwait) 2006	5th place (out of 5 teams)

== Head coaches ==
- (Iran) Hossein Ali Salimian (2004-05)
- (Pakistan) Shahid Aslam (2006)
- (Iran) Nariman Bakhtiar (2007-08)
- (Iran) Armond Nahabedian (2009-10)
- (Pakistan) Mahmood Rashid Dar (2011-15)
- (England) Adrian Mirfakhrai (2015-2016)
- Mohammad Yousof Raisi (2022-2024)

== Records and statistics ==
International Match Summary — Iran

Last updated 25 February 2020

Playing Record
Format	M	W	L	T	NR	Inaugural Match
Twenty20 Internationals	3	0	3	0	0	23 February 2020

=== Twenty20 International ===
- Highest team total: 108/8 v Kuwait, 25 February 2020 at Al Amerat Cricket Stadium, Muscat
- Highest individual score: 39, Yousef Shadzehisarjou v Kuwait, 25 February 2020 at Al Amerat Cricket Stadium, Muscat
- Best individual bowling figures: 1/10, Nader Zahadiafzal v Saudi Arabia, 24 February 2020 at Al Amerat Cricket Stadium, Muscat

T20I record versus other nations

Records complete to T20I #1061. Last updated 25 February 2020.

Opponent	M	W	L	T	NR	First match	First win
vs Associate Members
Kuwait	1	0	1	0	0	25 February 2020	
Saudi Arabia	1	0	1	0	0	24 February 2020	
United Arab Emirates	1	0	1	0	0	23 February 2020	

=== Other matches ===
For a list of selected international matches played by Iran, see Cricket Archive.

=== Other records ===
==== Limited-overs records ====
- Highest team total: 369/6 v China, January 13, 2009 at Gymkhana Club, Chiang Mai
- Lowest team total: 29 v Nepal, June 14, 2004 at Kelab Aman, Kuala Lumpur

==== Highest limited-overs scores for Iran ====
Player	Runs	Opposition	Venue	Year
Nariman Bakhtiar	120	China	Gymkhana Club, Chiang Mai	2009
Shirmohammad Baloochnezhad	119	China	Gymkhana Club, Chiang Mai	2009

==== Most limited-overs runs for Iran ====
Player	Runs	Total matches	Career span
Shirmohammad Baloochnezhad	420	14	2006-2012
Nariman Bakhtiar	408	10	2006-2009

==== Best bowling figures in an innings for Iran ====
Bowler	Figure	Opposition	Venue	Year
Abdul Ghafar Bejarzehi	5/55	Saudi Arabia	Doha Entertainment City Ground, Kuwait City	2006
Afshin Tirehdast	4/10	China	Royal Chiang Mai Golf Club, Maerim	2012
Naiem Bameri	4/12	China	Terdthai Cricket Ground, Bangkok	2010
Raez Mehrazar	4/30	Bhutan	Kelab Aman, Kuala Lumpur	2004
Loghman Sheikhi	4/33	Brunei	Prem Tinsulanonda International School, Chiang Mai	2009
Abdolvahab Ebrahimpour	4/41	Qatar	Asian Institute of Technology Ground, Bangkok	2010

== See also ==
- List of Iran Twenty20 International cricketers
- Iran national women's cricket team
