= Prem Tinsulanonda International School =

Cricket ground

- โรงเรียนนานาชาติเปรม ติณสูลานนท์

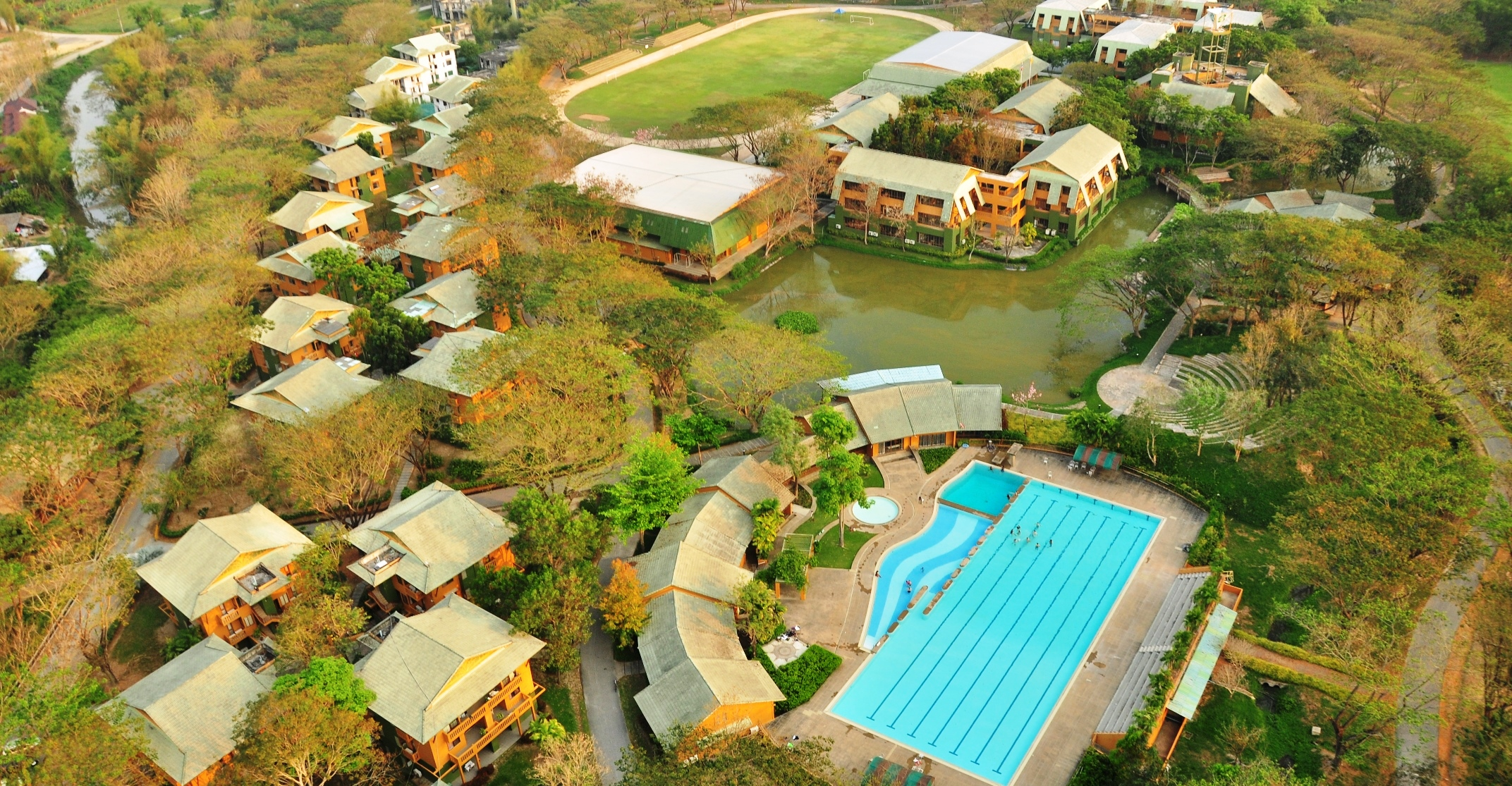
- Aerial view of school grounds

Location
- Mae Rim, Chiang Mai; Thailand; 18.962497°N 98.915492°E

Information
- Type: Co-educational private international day and boarding school
- Established: 2001
- Head teacher: Rachel Keys
- Teaching staff: 74
- Grades: EY1 - Grade 12
- Enrollment: Approximately 500 students
- Color: Green
- Athletics: Prem Panthers
- Mascot: Peter Panther
- Website: http://www.ptis.ac.th/

Prem Tinsulanonda International School (Thai: โรงเรียนนานาชาติเปรม ติณสูลานนท์, RTGS: Rong Rian Nana Chat Prem Tinnasulanon) is a Grade 1 - 12 international day and boarding school for boys and girls aged 3 – 19. The school opened in August 2001 near Chiang Mai, Thailand. The school is on a 100-acre campus, and has approximately 500 students.

== Description ==
The school, named for the military officer and statesman Prem Tinsulanonda, is situated approximately 25 km north of Chiang Mai in Mae Rim District. It caters to day students from Chiang Mai and surrounds and boarder.

== Accreditation ==
The school is authorised by the International Baccalaureate Organisation (IB) to offer the Diploma Program (IB DP) for grades 11 and 12, the Middle Years Program (IB MYP) for grades 6 to 10, and the Primary Years Program (IB PYP) for grades 1 to 5. PTIS is the first school in Southeast Asia and the only one in Thailand to offer all four IB programs, as it also offers the IBCP – International Baccalaureate Career-related Program. The school is accredited by the Council of International Schools (CIS), the New England Association of Schools and Colleges (NEASC), and the Thai Ministry of Education.
