= List of Bhutan Twenty20 International cricketers =

This is a list of Bhutanese Twenty20 International cricketers.

In April 2018, the ICC decided to grant full Twenty20 International (T20I) status to all its members. Therefore, all Twenty20 matches played between Bhutan and other ICC members after 1 January 2019 have the T20I status. Bhutan's first T20I was played against Nepal on 5 December 2019 during the 2019 South Asian Games.

This list comprises names of all members of the Bhutan cricket team who have played at least one T20I match. It is initially arranged in the order in which each player won his first Twenty20 cap. Where more than one player won his first Twenty20 cap in the same match, those players are listed alphabetically by surname.

== Key ==
General

- ‡ – Captain
- † – Wicket-keeper
- First – Year of debut
- Last – Year of latest game
- Mat – Number of matches played

Batting

- Runs – Runs scored in career
- HS – Highest score
- Avg – Runs scored per dismissal
- * – Batsman remained not out
- 50 – Number of half centuries
- 100 – Number of centuries

Bowling

- Balls – Balls bowled in career
- Wkt – Wickets taken in career
- BBI – Best bowling in an innings
- Ave – Average runs per wicket

Fielding

- Ca – Catches taken
- St – Stumpings affected

== List of players ==
Statistics are correct as of 14 October 2026.

Bhutan T20I cricketers
General					Batting					Bowling				Fielding		Ref
No.	Name	First	Last	Mat	Runs	HS	Avg	50	100	Balls	Wkt	BBI	Ave	Ca	St	Ref
1	Namgang Chejay†	2019	2026	26	276	50*	13.80	1	0	–	–	–	–	5	2	
2	Sonam Chophel†	2019	2026	11	98	58	10.88	1	0	–	–	–	–	2	1	
3	Karma Dorji	2019	2026	8	7	3*	2.33	0	0	116	6	2/45	28.66	2	0	
4	Ranjung Dorji	2019	2026	46	712	73	15.82	3	0	325	15	2/16	30.06	11	0	
5	Ugyen Dorji	2019	2026	3	17	8	5.66	0	0	12	0	–	–	0	0	
6	Thinley Jamtsho‡	2019	2026	48	674	66*	17.28	3	0	366	17	3/4	31.41	13	0	
7	Tobden Singye	2019	2019	2	17	11	8.50	0	0	36	1	1/53	65.00	0	0	
8	Jigme Singye‡	2019	2025	25	382	46	15.91	0	0	394	15	3/19	29.26	12	0	
9	Jigme Thinley	2019	2019	2	–	–	–	–	–	18	0	–	–	0	0	
10	Sonam Tobgay	2019	2019	2	39	24	19.50	0	0	24	0	–	–	1	0	
11	Tenzin Wangchuk jnr	2019	2019	2	9	9	4.50	0	0	–	–	–	–	0	0	
12	Jigme Dorji	2019	2024	9	74	30	8.22	0	0	–	–	–	–	1	0	
13	Kinga Loday	2019	2019	1	0	0*	–	0	0	–	–	–	–	0	0	
14	Kezang Nima	2019	2019	1	2	2*	–	0	0	18	1	1/22	22.00	0	0	
15	Gakul Ghalley	2022	2026	39	378	40	11.81	0	0	45	4	3/28	14.00	17	0	
16	Manoj Adhikari†	2022	2024	11	35	9*	11.66	0	0	–	–	–	–	4	4	
17	Namgay Thinley	2022	2026	41	451	100	12.52	0	1	754	36	3/3	20.83	10	0	
18	Ngawang Thinley	2022	2024	11	38	11*	6.33	0	0	177	15	4/13	14.13	3	0	
19	Kinley Penjor	2022	2022	1	–	–	–	–	–	12	0	–	–	1	0	
20	Suprit Pradhan‡	2022	2024	28	369	59	14.19	1	0	449	23	4/25	21.78	4	0	
21	Tenzin Wangchuk	2022	2025	36	172	31	6.61	0	0	638	33	4/41	24.39	12	0	
22	Sonam Yeshey	2022	2026	45	71	13*	5.07	0	0	904	44	8/7	18.77	6	0	
23	Tenjin Rabgey	2022	2026	42	737	108	17.97	4	1	54	3	2/7	11.00	15	0	
24	Sherab Loday	2022	2024	16	128	22	12.80	0	0	–	–	–	–	3	0	
25	Kishen Ghalley	2023	2023	4	32	19*	16.00	0	0	–	–	–	–	1	0	
26	Karma Dorji	2023	2025	16	15	6	5.00	0	0	187	7	2/4	34.57	1	0	
27	Tashi Phuntsho	2023	2026	24	163	24*	10.18	0	0	324	25	3/10	11.96	14	0	
28	Anand Mongar	2023	2026	13	20	8*	2.50	0	0	140	10	2/3	13.90	5	0	
29	Tashi Chopel	2024	2026	2	0	0	0.00	0	0	12	0	–	–	0	0	
30	Tashi Dorji	2024	2026	20	118	39	8.42	0	0	236	15	4/15	18.40	7	0	
31	Dawa Dawa	2024	2024	5	3	2*	–	0	0	84	6	3/13	17.83	1	0	
32	Tshering Tashi†	2024	2026	24	129	38	8.60	0	0	–	–	–	–	15	10	
32	Ramesh Limbu†	2025	2025	3	32	27	10.66	0	0	–	–	–	–	0	0	
33	Ugyen Dorji	2024	2025	3	0	0	0.00	0	0	42	1	1/6	56.00	2	0	
34	Rohit Limbu	2024	2026	5	44	27	8.80	0	0	–	–	–	–	0	0	
