= List of Saudi Arabia Twenty20 International cricketers =

This is a list of Saudi Arabian Twenty20 International cricketers.

In April 2018, the ICC decided to grant full Twenty20 International (T20I) status to all its members. Therefore, all Twenty20 matches played between Saudi Arabia and other ICC members after 1 January 2019 will have T20I status.

This list comprises all members of the Saudi Arabia cricket team who have played at least one T20I match. It is initially arranged in the order in which each player won his first Twenty20 cap. Where more than one player won his first Twenty20 cap in the same match, those players are listed alphabetically by surname.

== Key ==
General

- ‡ – Captain
- † – Wicket-keeper
- First – Year of debut
- Last – Year of latest game
- Mat – Number of matches played

Fielding

- Ca – Catches taken
- St – Stumpings affected

Batting

- Runs – Runs scored in career
- HS – Highest score
- Avg – Runs scored per dismissal
- * – Batsman remained not out
- 50 – Half centuries scored
- 100 – Centuries scored

Bowling

- Balls – Balls bowled in career
- Wkt – Wickets taken in career
- BBI – Best bowling in an innings
- Ave – Average runs per wicket

== List of players ==
Statistics are correct as of 14 October 2026.

Saudi Arabia T20I cricketers
General					Batting					Bowling				Fielding		Ref
No.	Name	First	Last	Mat	Runs	HS	Avg	50	100	Balls	Wkt	BBI	Ave	Ca	St	Ref
1	Abbas Saad	2019	2019	2	8	8	4.00	0	0	–	–	–	–	1	0	
2	Abdul Wahid	2019	2026	24	244	72*	16.26	1	0	360	22	4/14	20.77	8	0	
3	Faisal Khan	2019	2026	65	1,794	101	29.90	10	1	134	4	2/14	51.00	22	0	
4	Ibrarul Haq	2019	2019	5	69	49	17.25	0	0	102	7	3/28	16.55	3	0	
5	Mohammad Adnan	2019	2019	5	60	38*	–	0	0	102	2	1/27	60.00	0	0	
6	Muhammad Hamayun†	2019	2019	4	13	8	6.50	0	0	–	–	–	–	0	0	
7	Muhammad Nadeem	2019	2019	5	48	43	16.00	0	0	30	5	3/16	9.80	2	0	
8	Muhammad Naeem	2019	2020	7	125	42	31.25	0	0	6	0	–	–	1	0	
9	Sajid Cheema	2019	2021	11	225	52	20.45	1	0	–	–	–	–	7	0	
10	Shoaib Ali‡	2019	2020	8	15	9	5.00	0	0	129	4	2/25	45.75	2	0	
11	Usman Ali	2019	2020	8	17	8	8.50	0	0	172	5	1/5	37.60	1	0	
12	Ibrahim Khan	2019	2019	1	–	–	–	–	–	12	0	–	–	0	0	
13	Nawazish Jezuli†	2019	2019	1	–	–	–	–	–	–	–	–	–	2	0	
14	Shamsudheen Purat	2020	2020	6	118	88*	29.50	1	0	–	–	–	–	1	0	
15	Abdul Waheed‡	2020	2026	64	1,833	110	34.58	11	1	150	6	2/11	29.00	24	0	
16	Adil Butt	2020	2020	3	8	6*	8.00	0	0	54	4	2/15	13.75	2	0	
17	Imran Yousaf	2020	2026	14	4	2*	4.00	0	0	267	14	3/16	21.28	2	0	
18	Sarfraz Butt†	2020	2023	10	41	16	10.25	0	0	–	–	–	–	5	7	
19	Ali Abbas	2020	2025	4	20	12	6.66	0	0	–	–	–	–	0	0	
20	Khawar Zafar	2020	2020	2	5	5	5.00	0	0	–	–	–	–	0	0	
21	Amir Shahzad	2021	2021	1	–	–	–	–	–	–	–	–	–	0	0	
22	Hisham Sheikh‡	2021	2026	46	561	47*	22.44	0	0	784	39	4/12	22.84	19	0	
23	Imran Arif	2021	2021	4	36	22	9.00	0	0	96	6	2/14	14.66	2	0	
24	Ishtiaq Ahmad	2021	2026	56	59	16	7.37	0	0	1,118	76	5/27	16.61	20	0	
25	Zain Ul Abidin	2021	2026	56	447	58	16.55	1	0	1,120	59	5/6	18.40	16	0	
26	Usman Khalid	2021	2026	39	510	75*	20.40	2	0	614	32	4/6	18.90	10	0	
27	Atif-Ur-Rehman	2022	2024	19	18	6*	9.00	0	0	365	14	3/13	25.71	7	0	
28	Haseeb Ghafoor†	2022	2024	20	206	47*	34.33	0	0	–	–	–	–	9	3	
29	Irfan Sarfraz	2022	2022	4	38	18	12.66	0	0	18	0	–	–	1	0	
30	Kashif Siddique	2022	2024	11	254	57	23.09	2	0	2	1	1/1	1.00	3	0	
31	Muhammad Saqib	2022	2026	7	–	–	–	–	–	119	6	2/17	28.83	1	0	
32	Saad Khan	2022	2024	16	212	69	14.13	1	0	–	–	–	–	3	0	
33	Irshad Mubbashar	2022	2022	5	64	21	16.00	0	0	12	1	1/15	22.00	2	0	
34	Usman Najeeb	2022	2026	44	227	27	15.13	0	0	877	57	4/25	19.78	9	0	
35	Manan Ali†	2023	2026	52	873	52*	21.82	1	0	48	0	–	–	25	1	
36	Mohsin Shabbir	2023	2023	5	6	5	2.00	0	0	–	–	–	–	0	0	
37	Kashif Abbas	2023	2024	6	64	19	10.66	0	0	54	1	1/34	69.00	0	0	
38	Ahmed Baladraf	2023	2023	9	0	0	0.00	0	0	168	11	3/14	17.27	2	0	
39	Khalander Mustafa	2023	2023	6	4	4*	–	0	0	129	9	3/33	16.88	0	0	
40	Umair Sharif	2023	2023	8	122	44*	24.40	0	0	84	1	1/7	58.50	3	–	
41	Waqar Ul Hassan	2023	2024	10	178	44	25.42	0	0	–	–	–	–	2	0	
42	Waji Ul Hassan‡	2024	2026	41	744	115*	24.80	3	1	382	22	5/9	21.81	15	0	
43	Zuhair Muhammad	2024	2024	3	9	5	3.00	0	0	–	–	–	–	1	0	
44	Shahzaib	2024	2024	6	–	–	–	–	–	90	4	2/15	18.00	0	0	
45	Ahmad Raza	2024	2024	5	2	2*	–	0	0	78	2	1/28	50.50	2	0	
46	Sidharth Sankar†	2024	2026	11	52	37	13.00	0	0	–	–	–	–	6	4	
47	Saud Ahmad	2024	2024	1	–	–	–	–	–	–	–	–	–	0	0	
48	Zuber Sunasara	2024	2024	1	1	1	1.00	0	0	2	0	–	–	0	0	
49	Choudhry Md Imran	2024	2024	4	2	2	1.00	0	0	–	–	–	–	0	0	
50	Nawazish Akhtar†	2024	2025	11	65	18*	16.25	0	0	–	–	–	–	10	1	
51	Imtiaz Khan	2025	2025	5	1	1*	–	0	0	84	5	3/26	24.00	2	0	
52	Syed Faizan Tahir	2025	2025	10	49	20*	7.00	0	0	6	0	–	–	2	0	
53	Ghayour Ahmad	2025	2025	2	–	–	–	–	–	24	0	–	–	0	0	
54	Zahoor Ahmad	2025	2025	4	7	6	3.50	0	0	72	3	1/18	25.66	1	0	
55	Abdul Salam Khan	2025	2025	2	8	7	8.00	0	0	30	1	1/24	37.00	0	0	
56	Muhammad Atif	2026	2026	4	100	100*	100.00	0	1	36	5	4/11	5.20	3	0	
