= List of Mongolia Twenty20 International cricketers =

This is a list of Mongolia men's Twenty20 International cricketers. A Twenty20 International is an international cricket match between two representative teams, each having Twenty20 International status, as determined by the International Cricket Council (ICC). A Twenty20 International is played under the rules of Twenty20 cricket.

This list includes all players who have played at least one T20I match for Mongolia and is arranged in the order of debut appearance. Where more than one player won their first cap in the same match, those players are initially listed alphabetically at the time of debut.

Mongolia played their first T20I match against Nepal on 27 September 2023 during 2022 Asian Games.

== Key ==
General

- ‡ – Captain
- † – Wicket-keeper
- First – Year of debut
- Last – Year of latest game
- Mat – Number of matches played

Batting

- Runs – Runs scored in career
- HS – Highest score
- 50 – Number of half centuries
- Avg – Runs scored per dismissal
- * – Batter remained not out

Bowling

- Wkt – Wickets taken in career
- BBI – Best bowling in an innings
- Ave – Average runs per wicket

Fielding

- Ca – Catches taken
- St – Stumpings affected

== List of players ==
Statistics are correct as of 14 October 2026

Mongolia T20I cricketers
General					Batting				Bowling				Fielding		Ref
No.	Name	First	Last	Mat	Runs	HS	Avg	50	Balls	Wkt	BBI	Ave	Ca	St	Ref
1	Mungun Altankhuyag	2023	2023	2	8	8	4.00	0	12	1	1/55	55.00	1	0	
2	Namsrai Bat-yalalt	2023	2026	19	36	13	2.40	0	–	–	–	–	2	0	
3	Luvsanzundui Erdenebulgan‡	2023	2026	21	58	26	3.05	0	357	23	3/29	26.00	4	0	
4	Davaasuren Jamiyansuren	2023	2024	5	28	15	5.60	0	24	1	1/60	60.00	0	0	
5	Od Lutbayar	2023	2026	16	48	18	3.20	0	190	6	1/5	58.16	4	0	
6	Enkhtuvshin Munkhbat	2023	2023	2	1	1	0.50	0	–	–	–	–	0	0	
7	Nyambaatar Naranbaatar	2023	2024	13	16	5	1.45	0	112	1	1/30	253.00	4	0	
8	Enkh-erdene Otgonbayar†	2023	2024	9	25	7	3.12	0	–	–	–	–	8	0	
9	Tur Sumya	2023	2024	6	14	9*	7.00	0	–	–	–	–	1	0	
10	Buyantushig Terbish	2023	2024	4	1	1*	0.33	0	12	0	–	–	0	0	
11	Tumursukh Turmunkh	2023	2026	16	10	6*	1.00	0	177	6	2/31	53.66	1	0	
12	Temuulen Amarmend	2024	2026	18	74	21*	4.62	0	182	8	2/32	35.75	3	0	
13	Gandemberel Ganbold	2024	2026	19	87	21	5.11	0	18	0	–	–	2	0	
14	Zoljavkhlan Shurentsetseg	2024	2026	16	20	13	2.00	0	169	5	3/32	59.20	0	0	
15	Hitesh Upadhyay	2024	2024	5	14	8	2.80	0	–	–	–	–	2	0	
16	Mohan Vivekanandan	2024	2024	13	75	25	6.25	0	210	9	2/21	39.77	3	0	
17	Sodbileg Gantulga	2024	2026	12	10	6	1.66	0	78	3	2/21	42.66	0	0	
18	Sanchir Natsagdorj	2024	2024	4	15	11	3.75	0	–	–	–	–	1	0	
19	Turbold Batjargal	2024	2024	2	1	1*	1.00	0	–	–	–	–	0	0	
20	Enkhbat Batkhuyag	2024	2024	4	6	4*	2.00	0	23	1	1/13	38.00	0	0	
21	Uugan Batjargal	2026	2026	4	5	3	1.25	0	–	–	–	–	0	0	
22	Bayanbuu Jargaltuya	2026	2026	5	3	2	0.75	0	30	0	–	–	1	0	
23	Bilegdemberel Munkhdelger	2026	2026	5	11	7	2.75	0	–	–	–	–	0	0	
24	Battulga Tamjidsuren	2026	2026	5	2	2	1.00	0	55	1	1/34	79.00	0	0	
25	Bayarjargal Batbayr	2026	2026	4	2	2	1.00	0	12	–	–	–	1	0	
26	Munkhsuld Erdenebat	2026	2026	2	0	0	0.00	0	12	1	1/11	23.00	0	0	
