= Mongolia national cricket team =

Cricket team

Mongolia
- Association: Mongolia Cricket Association

Personnel
- Captain: Luvsanzundui Erdenebulgan
- Coach: Joseph Bull

International Cricket Council
- ICC status: Associate member (2021)
- ICC region: Asia
ICC Rankings	Current	Best-ever
T20I	94th	82nd (23 Jun 2024)

T20 Internationals
- First T20I: Nepal at Zhejiang University of Technology Cricket Field, Hangzhou; 27 September 2023
- Last T20I: Myanmar at UKM-YSD Cricket Oval, Bangi; 14 October 2026
T20Is	Played	Won/Lost
Total	21	0/19 (0 ties, 2 no results)
This year	6	0/5 (0 ties, 1 no result)
T20I kit
- As of 14 October 2026

The Mongolia national cricket team is the team that represents Mongolia in international men's cricket. In July 2021, the International Cricket Council (ICC) inducted the team as an Associate Member, becoming the 22nd member in the Asia region.

== History ==
Mongolia participated in the 2022 Asian Games, grouped along with Nepal and Maldives.

Mongolia made their international debut against Nepal at Zhejiang University of Technology Cricket Field, Hangzhou on 27 September 2023.

27 September 2023
09:00
Scorecard

Nepal; 314/3 (20 overs)	v	Mongolia; 41 (13.1 overs)
Kushal Malla 137* (50); Luvsanzundui Erdenebulgan 1/47 (4 overs)		Davaasuren Jamyansuren 10 (23); Karan KC 2/1 (2 overs)

Nepal won by 273 runs
Zhejiang University of Technology Cricket Field, Hangzhou
Umpires: Arif Ansari (Tha) and Chris Thurgate (Jpn)

- Mongolia won the toss and elected to field.
- First ever T20I match for Mongolia.

== Coaching history ==
Coaching has played a significant role in the development of cricket in Mongolia, with both local and international figures contributing to the growth of the game. Since joining the International Cricket Council (ICC) as an Associate Member in 2021, Mongolia has focused on building sustainable coaching structures for men’s, women’s, and youth programs. The following table lists the national team’s past and current coaches.

Coach	Tenure	Nationality	Role / Notes
Joseph Bull	2024–present	Australia	Current head coach. Began his tenure at the ICC T20 Regional Qualifiers and coaches both the men’s and women’s national programs.
David Talalla	2022 (Asian Games)	Australia	Served as head coach during Mongolia’s inaugural appearance at the Asian Games cricket competition.
Davaasuren Jamyansuren	2020–2022	Mongolia	Head coach who oversaw early domestic development and youth cricket initiatives in Mongolia.

== Records ==
International Match Summary

Last updated 14 October 2026

Playing Record
Format	M	W	L	T	NR	Inaugural Match
Twenty20 Internationals	21	0	19	0	2	27 September 2023

=== Twenty20 International ===
- Highest team total: 75 v. Japan on 12 May 2024 at Sano International Cricket Ground, Sano.
- Highest individual score: 25, Mohan Vivekanandan v. Japan on 12 May 2024 at Sano International Cricket Ground, Sano.
- Best individual bowling figures: 3/29, Luwsanzundui Erdenebulgan v. Maldives on 6 September 2024 at Bayuemas Oval, Pandamaran.

T20I record versus other nations

Records complete to T20I #4196. Last updated 14 October 2026.

Opponent	M	W	L	T	NR	First match	First win
vs Associate Members
Bahrain	1	0	1	0	0	11 October 2026	
Bhutan	1	0	1	0	0	8 October 2026	
Hong Kong	1	0	1	0	0	31 August 2024	
Japan	7	0	6	0	1	7 May 2024	
Kuwait	2	0	2	0	0	30 August 2024	
Malaysia	1	0	1	0	0	9 September 2024	
Maldives	2	0	2	0	0	28 September 2023	
Myanmar	2	0	2	0	0	2 September 2024	
Nepal	1	0	1	0	0	27 September 2023	
Qatar	1	0	0	0	1	12 October 2026	
Singapore	1	0	1	0	0	5 September 2024	
Thailand	1	0	1	0	0	9 October 2026	

== See also ==
- Mongolia women's national cricket team
- Mongolia Cricket Association
- List of Mongolia Twenty20 International cricketers
