= Thailand national cricket team =

Thailand
- Association: Cricket Association of Thailand

Personnel
- Captain: Austin Lazarus

International Cricket Council
- ICC status: Associate member (2005); Affiliate member (1995)
- ICC region: Asia
ICC Rankings	Current	Best-ever
T20I	58th	52nd (11 May 2025)

T20 Internationals
- First T20I: v Malaysia at Kinrara Oval, Kuala Lumpur; 24 June 2019
- Last T20I: v Myanmar at UKM-YSD Cricket Oval, Bangi; 12 October 2026
T20Is	Played	Won/Lost
Total	74	25/47 (0 ties, 2 no results)
This year	12	4/8 (0 ties, 0 no results)
T20I kit
- As of 12 October 2026

The Thailand national cricket team is the team that represents Thailand in international cricket. The team is organised by the Cricket Association of Thailand, which has been an associate member of the International Cricket Council (ICC) since 2005, having been an affiliate member between 1995 and 2005. Almost all of Thailand's matches have come against other Asian teams, including in several Asian Cricket Council tournaments.

== History ==
=== Beginnings ===
Cricket was introduced to Thailand by the children of elite Thai families who learnt the game during education in England. They founded the Bangkok City Cricket Club in 1890, and the side played its first game in November of that year. An invitation to come to the city was sent to the Singapore Cricket Club, but it was turned down due to the fear of a cholera epidemic.

Cricket in the Thai community failed to develop however, and by the early-1900s the game was confined almost entirely to expatriate residents. The Royal Bangkok Sports Club began to play cricket in 1905 and they were instrumental in arranging the first international in January 1909, when Siam beat the Straits Settlements by an innings in Singapore. Siam won the return match in Bangkok the following year, and the Straits Settlements won the third and final match in December 1911.

Cricket remained a recreational activity, with a national side not surfacing again until 1990. Various sides came to play the Royal Bangkok Sports Club in the 1960s and 1970s, including Worcestershire in 1965 and the MCC in 1970. This encouraged the development of more cricket facilities.

=== Modern era ===
One player based in Thailand in the late-1980s and early-1990s was Ronald Endley, who worked for Volvo and persuaded the company to offer a trophy for a match against Hong Kong. This match was played in January 1990 and took the form of a two-day match, which was drawn. It became a one-day match in 1991, and 1992 saw Malaysia join in for a tri-series. The tournament was superseded by the Tuanku Ja'afar Cup, which involved all three teams along with Singapore.

The early-1990s were one of the most successful periods for Thai cricket, but tight ICC player eligibility rules came into force when they became an ICC affiliate member in 1995, which led to them being forced to field weaker teams. This coincided with financial problems, causing Thailand to pull out of tournaments. In contrast, the early part of the 21st century has seen youth cricket take priority in addition to much more being done to promote the game beyond the expatriate population.

In August 2017, Thailand won the bronze medal in the 50-over tournament in cricket at the 2017 Southeast Asian Games. They placed fourth in the 20-over tournament, losing to Indonesia.

=== 2018-Present ===
In April 2018, the ICC granted full Twenty20 International (T20I) status to all its members. All Twenty20 matches played between Thailand and other ICC members since 1 January 2019 are a full T20I.

Thailand played their first T20I on 24 June against Malaysia during the 2019 Malaysia Tri-Nation Series.

24 June 2019
10:00
Scorecard

Thailand; 113/8 (20 overs)	v	Malaysia; 114/5 (17 overs)
Naveed Pathan 37 (28); Muhamad Syahadat 3/7 (4 overs)		Muhamad Syahadat 41* (32); Mahsid Faheem 2/26 (4 overs)

Malaysia won by 5 wickets
Kinrara Oval, Kuala Lumpur
Umpires: Viswanadan Kalidas (Mas) and Mathan Kumar (Mas)
Player of the match: Muhamad Syahadat (Mas)

- Malaysia won the toss and elected to field.
- First ever T20I match for Thailand.

== International grounds ==
- Terdthai Cricket Ground, Bangkok
- Asian Institute of Technology Ground, Pathum Thani
Locations of all stadiums which have hosted international cricket matches within Thailand

== Tournament history ==
=== ACC Challenger Cup ===
- 2023: Semi finals
- 2024: 5th place

=== Asia Cup Qualifier ===
- 2018: Did not participate
- 2020: Did not qualify

=== ACC Eastern Region T20 ===
- 2018: Runner up
- 2020: 5th place

=== ACC Trophy ===
- 1996: First round
- 1998: First round
- 2000: Did not participate
- 2002: First round
- 2004: First round
- 2006: First round

ACC Trophy Challenge

Thailand hosted the 2009, 2010 and 2012 ACC Trophy Challenge, the second tier of the limited-overs competition for non-Test-playing ACC members.

- 2009 Challenge: 4th place
- 2010 Challenge: 4th place
- 2012 Challenge: 4th place

Thailand has not participated in the ACC Premier League.

=== Southeast Asian Games ===
Southeast Asian Games record
Year	Round	Position	GP	W	L	T	NR
(Malaysia) 2017	Bronze Medal	3/5	4	2	2	0	0
Total			4	2	2	0	0

== Current squad ==
Updated as of 6 May 2024

This lists all the players who played for Thailand in the 2024 Thailand tour of Indonesia.

Name	Age	Batting style	Bowling style	Notes
Batters
Chaloemwong Chatphaisan	22	Right-handed	Right-arm medium	
Yodsak Saranonnakkun	22	Right-handed		
Austin Lazarus	35	Right-handed		Captain
Satarut Rungrueang	23	Right-handed		
All-rounders
Narawit Nuntarach	23	Right-handed	Right-arm medium	
Jandre Coetzee	42	Left-handed	Left-arm medium	
Wicketkeeper
Akshaykumar Yadav	27	Right-handed		Vice-captain
Spin Bowlers
Nopphon Senamontree	35	Right-handed	Slow left-arm orthodox	
Sarawut Maliwan	24	Right-handed	Slow left-arm orthodox	
Anucha Kalasi	20	Right-handed	Right-arm leg break	
Pace Bowlers
Mukesh Thakur	38	Right-handed	Left-arm medium	
Wiraphan Ngowhuad	20	Right-handed	Right-arm medium	

== Records and statistics ==
International Match Summary — Thailand

Last updated 12 October 2026

Playing Record
Format	M	W	L	T	NR	Inaugural Match
Twenty20 Internationals	74	25	47	0	2	24 June 2019

=== Twenty20 International ===
- Highest team total: 178/5 v Cambodia on 20 November 2024 at West End Park, Doha.
- Highest individual score: 95, Austin Lazarus v Indonesia on 1 May 2024 at Udayana Cricket Ground, Jimbaran.
- Best individual bowling figures: 5/10, Jandre Coetzee v Indonesia on 20 October 2024 at Gelephu, Gelephu.

T20I record versus other nations

Records complete to T20I #4193. Last updated 12 October 2026.

Opponent	M	W	L	T	NR	First match	First win
vs Associate Members
Bahrain	5	1	3	0	1	22 November 2024	22 November 2024
Bhutan	8	5	3	0	0	6 July 2022	31 July 2023
Cambodia	1	1	0	0	0	20 November 2024	20 November 2024
China	1	1	0	0	0	27 July 2023	27 July 2023
Cook Islands	2	1	1	0	0	7 May 2025	9 May 2025
Hong Kong	1	0	1	0	0	3 March 2020	
Indonesia	10	6	4	0	0	1 May 2023	7 February 2024
Japan	4	1	3	0	0	2 February 2024	11 May 2025
Kuwait	1	0	1	0	0	8 October 2026	
Malaysia	12	0	11	0	1	24 June 2019	
Maldives	7	4	3	0	0	26 June 2019	29 June 2019
Mongolia	1	1	0	0	0	9 October 2026	9 October 2026
Myanmar	2	2	0	0	0	28 July 2023	28 July 2023
Nepal	1	0	1	0	0	4 March 2020	
Philippines	1	0	1	0	0	13 December 2025	
Qatar	2	0	2	0	0	19 November 2024	
Saudi Arabia	5	0	5	0	0	13 February 2024	
Singapore	8	1	7	0	0	29 February 2020	4 February 2024
United Arab Emirates	1	0	1	0	0	23 November 2024	
Uzbekistan	1	1	0	0	0	25 June 2026	25 June 2026

=== Other matches ===
For a list of selected international matches played by Thailand, see Cricket Archive.

== See also ==
- Cricket Association of Thailand
- List of Thailand Twenty20 International cricketers
- Thailand women's national cricket team
