= Myanmar national cricket team =

International cricket team of Myanmar

Myanmar
- Association: Myanmar Cricket Federation

Personnel
- Captain: Htet Lin Aung
- Coach: (Myanmar) Michael

History
- First-class debut: Marylebone Cricket Club in 1927 at BAA Ground

International Cricket Council
- ICC status: Associate member (2017)
- ICC region: Asia
| ICC Rankings | Current | Best-ever |
| T20I | 94th | 74th (2-May-2019) |

International cricket
- First international: 16 August 2006 v Kuwait at Kuala Lumpur

T20 Internationals
- First T20I: v Bhutan at Bayuemas Oval, Pandamaran; 26 July 2023
- Last T20I: v Mongolia at UKM-YSD Cricket Oval, Bangi; 14 October 2026
| T20Is | Played | Won/Lost |
| Total | 38 | 7/31 (0 ties, 0 no results) |
| This year | 6 | 1/5 (0 ties, 0 no results) |
T20I kit
- As of 14 October 2026

The Myanmar national cricket team represents Myanmar in international cricket matches. It has been an affiliate member of the International Cricket Council (ICC) since 2006 and an associate member since 2017.

In April 2018, the ICC decided to grant full Twenty20 International (T20I) status to all its members. Therefore, all Twenty20 matches played between Myanmar and other ICC members after 1 January 2019 have the full T20I status.

== History ==
=== British rule ===
Cricket in Myanmar dates back to when Burma was a province of British India. The British brought the game there, as they did to the rest of India, and the game progressed to the level where the Marylebone Cricket Club played two two-day first class matches there on a tour to India in 1926/1927. The first of these was played at the Gymkhana ground in Rangoon against a Rangoon Gymkhana cricket team. That game was drawn with the MCC on top after forcing the home team to follow-on. The second game was against the Burma team themselves at the BAA Ground, also in Rangoon. The MCC won this game restricting Burma to low scores in both their innings, and only having to chase 7 runs to win in their second innings. These remains the country's only first class games.

=== Reemergence ===
Following independence cricket remained very much a minority sport in Myanmar, and was nowhere to be seen between 1988 and 1995. In 2002 the game was seeing a resurgence, with a seven team league organised by former Bengal first class player Naresh Kumar, with some former first class players taking part in games attended by around 250 people. Cricket has also been featured on TV news reports. The Myanmar Cricket Federation received a visit from the ICC in 2004 and became an affiliate member of the organisation in 2006. The game is currently played primarily by ex-pats, but the game has recently been introduced into schools.

=== 2006 ACC Trophy ===
Just two months after gaining ICC membership, Myanmar headed to Malaysia to take part in the 2006 ACC Trophy for the first time. They had a very poor tournament, with a series of heavy defeats to Kuwait (by 9 wickets in 10 overs), to Hong Kong (by 422 runs, with Myanmar being bowled out for 20) and to Bhutan (by 9 wickets in 6.5 overs; Bhutan had also received heavy defeats in their previous matches).

The nadir of their tournament came against Nepal, where Myanmar were bowled out for just 10 off 12.1 overs after losing the toss and being sent in; no batsman scored more than one, the innings included five ducks, and extras top scored with five (three leg byes and two wides). Nepal hit three off the first ball, followed by three wides that went for five, and then hit another three from the second legitimate delivery to win by ten wickets. Some critics called it the greatest mismatch in the history of international cricket, and the score of 10 is the lowest in any level of men's international cricket.

=== 2009–present ===
With the separation of the ACC Trophy into Elite and Challenge divisions, Myanmar have since competed in the Challenge divisions in both 2009, in which they came last, and 2010. Despite the cricket being of a lesser quality than the Elite division, Myanmar have continued to suffer from heavy defeats.

In August 2017, Myanmar played cricket at the 2017 Southeast Asian Games after a five-year absence from international cricket. In the 50-over tournament, they won only one out of four matches, defeating Indonesia by four wickets. This was Myanmar's first ever victory in international cricket. In the 20-over tournament, they lost both their games.

19 August 2017
09:30
Scorecard

| Indonesia; 96 (27 overs) | v | Myanmar; 97/6 (24.3 overs) |
| I Geda Suda Arsa 45* (89); Paing Danu 5/9 (7 overs) | | Htet Lin Aung 25* (41); Putra Kisawa 2/14 (6 overs) |

Myanmar won by 4 wickets
Kinrara Academy Oval, Selangor
Umpires: Batumalai Ramani (Mas) and Zaidan Taha (Mas)

- Indonesia won the toss and elected to bat.
- First ever victory in international cricket for Myanmar.

Myanmar played their first T20I on 26 July 2023, against Bhutan, during the 2023 ICC Men's T20 World Cup Asia Qualifier.

26 July 2023
13:30
Scorecard

| Bhutan; 105 (20 overs) | v | Myanmar; 74/9 (20 overs) |
| Sherab Loday 18 (16); Pyae Phyo Wai 3/29 (4 overs) | | Ye Naing Tun 19 (17); Karma Dorji 2/4 (2 overs) |

Bhutan won by 31 runs
Bayuemas Oval, Pandamaran
Umpires: Viswanadan Kalidas (Mas) and Ramasamy Venkatesh (HK)
Player of the match: Tashi Phuntsho (Bhu)

- Bhutan won the toss and elected to bat.
- First ever T20I match for Myanmar.

Myanmar registered their first ever victory in T20Is against China on 29 January 2024 in the 2024 ACC Men's Challenger Cup.

29 January 2024
09:30
Scorecard

| China; 74 (19.3 overs) | v | Myanmar; 75/9 (19.3 overs) |
| Zong Yuechao 19* (25); Htet Lin Aung 3/16 (4 overs) | | Paing Danu 14 (18); Chen Zhuo Yue 3/7 (4 overs) |

Myanmar won by 1 wicket
Terdthai Cricket Ground, Bangkok
Player of the match: Htet Lin Aung (Mya)

- Myanmar won the toss and elected to field.
- First ever victory for Myanmar in T20Is

== Tournament history ==
=== ODI World Cup ===
World Cup record
| Year/Host | Round | Position | P | W | L | T | NR |
|---|---|---|---|---|---|---|---|
| (England) 1975 | No ICC ODI status/Did not qualify | | | | | | |
| (England) 1979 | No ICC ODI status/Did not qualify | | | | | | |
| (England) 1983 | No ICC ODI status/Did not qualify | | | | | | |
| (India) (Pakistan) 1987 | No ICC ODI status/Did not qualify | | | | | | |
| (Australia) (New Zealand) 1992 | No ICC ODI status/Did not qualify | | | | | | |
| (India) (Pakistan) (Sri Lanka) 1996 | No ICC ODI status/Did not qualify | | | | | | |
| (England) 1999 | No ICC ODI status/Did not qualify | | | | | | |
| (South Africa) (Zimbabwe) (Kenya) 2003 | No ICC ODI status/Did not qualify | | | | | | |
| (Cricket West Indies) 2007 | No ICC ODI status/Did not qualify | | | | | | |
| (India) (Sri Lanka) (Bangladesh) 2011 | No ICC ODI status/Did not qualify | | | | | | |
| (Australia) (New Zealand) 2015 | No ICC ODI status/Did not qualify | | | | | | |
| (England) 2019 | No ICC ODI status/Did not qualify | | | | | | |
| (India) 2023 | No ICC ODI status/Did not qualify | | | | | | |
| Total | 0 | 0/13 | 0 | 0 | 0 | 0 | 0 |

=== ICC T20 World Cup ===
ICC T20 World Cup record
| Year/Host | Round | Position | GP | W | L | T | NR |
|---|---|---|---|---|---|---|---|
| (South Africa) 2007 | Did not qualify | | | | | | |
| (England) 2009 | Did not qualify | | | | | | |
| (Cricket West Indies) 2010 | Did not qualify | | | | | | |
| (Sri Lanka) 2012 | Did not qualify | | | | | | |
| (Bangladesh) 2014 | Did not qualify | | | | | | |
| (India) 2016 | Did not qualify | | | | | | |
| (United Arab Emirates) (Oman) 2021 | Did not qualify | | | | | | |
| (Australia) 2022 | Did not qualify | | | | | | |
| (United States) (Cricket West Indies) 2024 | Did not qualify | | | | | | |
| Total | 0/9 | 0 | 0 | 0 | 0 | 0 | 0 |

=== ACC Asia Cup ===
ACC Asia Cup record
| Host & Year | Round | Position | Pld | W | L | T | NR |
|---|---|---|---|---|---|---|---|
| (United Arab Emirates) 1984 | Did not qualify | | | | | | |
| (Sri Lanka) 1986 | Did not qualify | | | | | | |
| (Bangladesh) 1988 | Did not qualify | | | | | | |
| (India) 1990–91 | Did not qualify | | | | | | |
| (United Arab Emirates) 1995 | Did not qualify | | | | | | |
| (Sri Lanka) 1997 | Did not qualify | | | | | | |
| (Bangladesh) 2000 | Did not qualify | | | | | | |
| (Sri Lanka) 2004 | Did not qualify | | | | | | |
| (Pakistan) 2008 | Did not qualify | | | | | | |
| (Sri Lanka) 2010 | Did not qualify | | | | | | |
| (Bangladesh) 2012 | Did not qualify | | | | | | |
| (Bangladesh) 2014 | Did not qualify | | | | | | |
| (Bangladesh) 2016 | Did not qualify | | | | | | |
| (United Arab Emirates) 2018 | Did not qualify | | | | | | |
| (United Arab Emirates) 2022 | Did not qualify | | | | | | |
| (Pakistan) (Sri Lanka) 2023 | Did not qualify | | | | | | |
| Total | 0/16 | 0 | 0 | 0 | 0 | 0 | 0 |

=== ACC Men's Challenger Cup ===
ACC Men's Challenger Cup record
| Year/Host | Round | Position | GP | W | L | T | NR |
|---|---|---|---|---|---|---|---|
| (Thailand) 2023 | Group stages | – | 3 | 0 | 3 | 0 | 0 |
| (Thailand) 2024 | 9th place play-off | 10/10 | 3 | 1 | 2 | 0 | 0 |
| Total | 0/2 | 0 Titles | 6 | 1 | 5 | 0 | 0 |

=== ACC Eastern Region T20 ===
ACC Eastern Region T20 record
| Year/Host | Round | Position | GP | W | L | T | NR |
|---|---|---|---|---|---|---|---|
| (Thailand) 2018 | Round-robin | 3/4 | 3 | 1 | 1 | 0 | 1 |
| (Oman) 2020 | Did not participate | | | | | | |
| Total | 1/2 | 0 Titles | 3 | 1 | 1 | 0 | 1 |

=== ACC Asia Cup Qualifier ===
ACC Asia Cup Qualifier record
| Year/Host | Round | Position | GP | W | L | T | NR |
|---|---|---|---|---|---|---|---|
| (Bangladesh) 2016 | Did not participate | | | | | | |
| (Malaysia) 2018 | Did not participate | | | | | | |
| (Oman) 2022 | Withdrew/Did not participate | | | | | | |
| Total | 0/3 | 0 Titles | 0 | 0 | 0 | 0 | 0 |

=== ACC Men's Premier Cup ===
ACC Men's Premier Cup record
| Year/Host | Round | Position | GP | W | L | T | NR |
|---|---|---|---|---|---|---|---|
| (Nepal) 2023 | Did not participate | | | | | | |
| (Oman) 2024 | Did not participate | | | | | | |
| Total | 0/2 | 0 Titles | 0 | 0 | 0 | 0 | 0 |

=== ICC T20 World Cup Asia Sub-regional Qualifiers ===
ICC T20 World Cup Asia Sub-regional Qualifiers records
| Host/Year | Round | Position | GP | W | L | T | NR |
|---|---|---|---|---|---|---|---|
| (Malaysia) 2018 | Round-robin | 6/7 | 6 | 1 | 5 | 0 | 0 |
| (Malaysia) 2021 | Did not held due to COVID-19 pandemic | | | | | | |
| (Malaysia) 2023 | Round-robin | 5/5 | 4 | 0 | 4 | 0 | 0 |
| (Malaysia) 2024 | Round-robin | 6/7 | 6 | 1 | 5 | 0 | 0 |
| Total | 3/3 | 0 Titles | 16 | 2 | 14 | 0 | 0 |

== Records ==
International Match Summary

Last updated 14 October 2026

Playing Record
| Format | M | W | L | T | NR | Inaugural Match |
| Twenty20 Internationals | 38 | 7 | 31 | 0 | 0 | 26 July 2023 |

=== Twenty20 International ===
- Highest team total: 148/7 v. Timor-Leste on 12 November 2025 at Udayana Cricket Ground, Jimbaran.
- Highest individual score: 72*, Paing Danu v. Indonesia on 16 November 2024 at Udayana Cricket Ground, Jimbaran.
- Best individual bowling figures: 4/10, Htet Lin Oo v. Timor-Leste on 12 November 2025 at Udayana Cricket Ground, Jimbaran.

T20I record versus other nations

Records complete to T20I #4196. Last updated 14 October 2026.

| Opponent | M | W | L | T | NR | First match | First win |
|---|---|---|---|---|---|---|---|
vs Associate Members
| Bahrain | 1 | 0 | 1 | 0 | 0 | 8 October 2026 | |
| Bhutan | 7 | 0 | 7 | 0 | 0 | 26 July 2023 | |
| Cambodia | 1 | 0 | 1 | 0 | 0 | 27 January 2024 | |
| China | 3 | 1 | 2 | 0 | 0 | 31 July 2023 | 29 January 2024 |
| Hong Kong | 1 | 0 | 1 | 0 | 0 | 30 August 2024 | |
| Indonesia | 10 | 0 | 10 | 0 | 0 | 12 November 2024 | |
| Kuwait | 2 | 0 | 2 | 0 | 0 | 3 September 2024 | |
| Malaysia | 2 | 0 | 2 | 0 | 0 | 30 July 2023 | |
| Maldives | 1 | 0 | 1 | 0 | 0 | 5 September 2024 | |
| Mongolia | 2 | 2 | 0 | 0 | 0 | 2 September 2024 | 2 September 2024 |
| Qatar | 1 | 0 | 1 | 0 | 0 | 9 October 2026 | |
| Singapore | 1 | 0 | 1 | 0 | 0 | 9 September 2024 | |
| Thailand | 2 | 0 | 2 | 0 | 0 | 28 July 2023 | |
| Timor-Leste | 4 | 4 | 0 | 0 | 0 | 7 November 2025 | 7 November 2025 |

=== Other ===
For a list of selected international matches played by Myanmar, see Cricket Archive.

== See also ==
- Cricket in Myanmar
- List of Myanmar Twenty20 International cricketers
