= Bhutan national cricket team =

National Cricket Team of Bhutan

Bhutan
- Nickname: The Dragons
- Association: Bhutan Cricket Council Board

Personnel
- Captain: Thinley Jamtsho
- Coach: Kumar Subba

Team information
- Home ground: Gelephu International Cricket Ground

International Cricket Council
- ICC status: Associate member (2017)
- ICC region: Asia
ICC Rankings	Current	Best-ever
T20I	75th	57th (9 July 2022)

International cricket
- First international: v Maldives (Kirtipur, Nepal; 6 March 2003)

T20 Internationals
- First T20I: v Nepal at Tribhuvan University International Cricket Ground, Kirtipur; 5 December 2019
- Last T20I: v Kuwait at Selangor Turf Club, Kuala Lumpur; 12 October 2026
T20Is	Played	Won/Lost
Total	51	18/33 (0 ties, 0 no results)
This year	9	3/6 (0 ties, 0 no results)
T20I kit
- As of 12 October 2026

The Bhutan men's national cricket team, nicknamed The Dragons, represents the Kingdom of Bhutan in international cricket. The team is organised by the Bhutan Cricket Council Board, which became an affiliate member of the International Cricket Council (ICC) in 2001 and an associate member in 2017. Bhutan made its international debut in 2003, at the Emerging Nations Tournament organised by the Asian Cricket Council (ACC). The team has since regularly participated in ACC tournaments, and also in the World Cricket League event WCL Division Eight in 2010 and 2012.

The Dechephu Lhakhang temple in Thimphu is the spiritual home of Bhutan Cricket and players visit before every tournament. “We do not pray for victory”, said national captain Damber Singh Gurung, “we pray for each other to give our best and to emerge complete from the competition.”

== History ==
Bhutan Cricket Council Board became an affiliate member of the ICC in 2001. They played their first internationals in 2003 in a tri-nation series against Maldives and Nepal, hosted by the latter. They made their ACC Trophy debut at the 2004 tournament, where they made the quarter-finals. Their first international victory came against Iran.

They again competed at the ACC Trophy in 2006 but were eliminated in the first round after a series of heavy defeats. Their only win came against newcomers Myanmar.

Following the 2006 ACC Trophy, the tournament was split into two divisions: Elite and Challenge. Bhutan took part in the 2009 ACC Trophy Challenge, where they were runners up. This result qualified them for the next ACC Trophy Elite as well as Division Eight of the World Cricket League.

=== 2018-Present ===
In April 2018, the ICC decided to grant full Twenty20 International (T20I) status to all its members. Therefore, all Twenty20 matches played between Bhutan and other ICC members after 1 January 2019 have had the T20I status.

Bhutan played their first T20I on 5 December 2019, against Nepal, during the 2019 South Asian Games. Nepal won that match by 141 runs.

5 December 2019
09:00
Scorecard

Nepal; 236/3 (20 overs)	v	Bhutan; 95/6 (20 overs)
Gyanendra Malla 107 (55); Karma Dorji 2/45 (4 overs)		Ranjung Mikyo Dorji 27 (23); Paras Khadka 2/11 (4 overs)

Nepal won by 141 runs
Tribhuvan University International Cricket Ground, Kirtipur
Umpires: Deepal Gunawardene (SL) and Buddhi Pradhan (Nep)
Player of the match: Gyanendra Malla (Nep)

- Bhutan won the toss and elected to field.
- First ever T20I match for Bhutan.

== Tournament history ==
=== ICC World Cricket League ===
ICC World Cricket League record
Year/Host	Round	Position	GP	W	L	T	NR
(Kuwait) 2010	Plate	7/8	5	1	4	0	0
(Samoa) 2012	7th place play-off	8/8	4	0	4	0	0
Total	2/2	0 Titles	9	1	8	0	0

=== ACC Trophy Elite ===
ACC Trophy Elite record
Year/Host	Round	Position	GP	W	L	T	NR
(Malaysia) 1996	Did not participate						
(Nepal) 1998	Did not participate						
(United Arab Emirates) 2000	Did not participate						
(Singapore) 2002	Did not participate						
(Malaysia) 2004	Group stages	8/10	2	1	1	0	0
(Malaysia) 2006	Group stages	13/17	4	1	3	0	0
(Malaysia) 2008	Did not participate						
(Kuwait) 2010	Group stages	8/10	4	1	3	0	0
(United Arab Emirates) 2012	Group stages	10/10	4	0	4	0	0
Total	4/9	0 Titles	14	3	11	0	0

=== ACC Twenty20 Cup ===
ACC Twenty20 Cup record
Year/Host	Round	Position	GP	W	L	T	NR
(Kuwait) 2007	Did not participate						
(United Arab Emirates) 2009	Did not participate						
(Nepal) 2011	Group stages	9/10	4	0	4	0	0
(Nepal) 2013	Did not participate						
(United Arab Emirates) 2015	Did not participate						
Total	1/5	0 Titles	4	0	4	0	0

=== ACC Eastern Region T20 ===
ACC Eastern Region T20record
Host & Year	Round	Position	GP	W	L	T	NR
(Thailand) 2018	Champion	1/4	4	2	1	0	1
Total	1/1	1 Titles	4	2	1	0	1

=== ACC Challenger Cup ===
ACC Men's Challenger Cup record
Host/Year	Round	Position	GP	W	L	T	NR
(Thailand) 2023	Semi-finals	–	4	1	3	0	0
(Thailand) 2024	7th place play-off	8/10	4	0	4	0	0
Total	2/2	0 Titles	8	1	7	0	0

=== ICC T20 World Cup Asia Sub-regional Qualifiers ===
ICC T20 World Cup Asia Sub-regional Qualifiers records
Host/Year	Round	Position	GP	W	L	T	NR
(Malaysia) 2018	Round-robin	5/7	6	2	4	0	0
(Malaysia) 2021	Did not held due to COVID-19 pandemic						
(Malaysia) 2023	Round-robin	3/5	4	2	2	0	0
(Qatar) 2024	To be determined						
Total	3/3	0 Titles	10	4	6	0	0

== Records and statistics ==
International Match Summary — Bhutan

Last updated 11 October 2026

Playing Record
Format	M	W	L	T	NR	Inaugural Match
Twenty20 Internationals	50	18	32	0	0	5 December 2019

=== Twenty20 International ===
- Highest team total: 216/8 v. Myanmar on 24 December 2025 at Gelephu International Cricket Ground, Gelephu.
- Highest individual score: 100, Namgay Thinley v. Myanmar on 24 December 2025 at Gelephu International Cricket Ground, Gelephu.
- Best individual bowling figures: 8/7, Sonam Yeshey v. Myanmar on 26 December 2025 at Gelephu International Cricket Ground, Gelephu.

T20I record versus other nations

Records complete to T20I #4194. Last updated 12 October 2026.

Opponent	M	W	L	T	NR	First match	First win
vs Associate Members
Bahrain	8	0	8	0	0	23 November 2024	
Cambodia	2	0	2	0	0	5 February 2024	
China	1	1	0	0	0	30 July 2023	30 July 2023
Indonesia	3	2	1	0	0	1 February 2024	22 October 2024
Japan	1	0	1	0	0	27 February 2026	
Kuwait	1	0	1	0	0	12 October 2026	
Malaysia	4	0	4	0	0	2 July 2022	
Maldives	8	4	4	0	0	7 December 2019	4 July 2022
Mongolia	1	1	0	0	0	8 October 2026	8 October 2026
Myanmar	7	7	0	0	0	26 July 2023	26 July 2023
Nepal	1	0	1	0	0	5 December 2019	
Qatar	2	0	2	0	0	20 November 2024	
Saudi Arabia	3	0	3	0	0	3 February 2024	
Thailand	8	3	5	0	0	6 July 2022	6 July 2022
United Arab Emirates	1	0	1	0	0	19 November 2024	

=== Other records ===
For a list of selected international matches played by Bhutan, see Cricket Archive.

== See also ==
- List of Bhutan Twenty20 International cricketers
- Bhutan women's national cricket team
