= List of Burmese first-class cricketers =

As part of the MCC tour of India and Ceylon in 1926/27, MCC visited Burma to play two first-class matches: against Rangoon Gymkhana at the Gymkhana Ground, Rangoon from 9–10 January 1927 and against Burma at the Burma Athletic Association Ground, Rangoon from 12–13 January 1927.

In all, 16 cricketers represented Burma and Rangoon Gymkhana in first-class matches. While some of the cricketers listed below represented other teams, the information included is solely for their career with Burma and Rangoon Gymkhana.

Following Burmese Independence in 1948, cricket became a minority sport in the country and while the Myanmar Cricket Federation is now an Affiliate member of the International Cricket Council (ICC) it will be many years before Myanmar plays another first-class match.

== List ==
Name	Mat	Batting			Bowling					Fielding		Notes	Ref(s)
Name	Mat	Runs	HS	Avg	Balls	Wkt	BBI	BBM	Ave	Ca	St	Notes	Ref(s)
Hubert Ashton	2	132	60*	44.00	0	0	-	-	–	1	0	Wisden Cricketer of the Year, 1922.	
Herbert Aston	2	32	22	10.66	204	2	2/106	2/106	78.00	1	0	Represented Ireland in Rugby Union.	
A. E. Bham	1	1	1	0.50	0	0	-	-	–	0	0		
Patrick Dodwell	1	1	1	1.00	72	0	–	–	–	-	0		
Edward Gerrity	1	35	34*	35.00	0	0	-	-	–	0	0		
Edward Gibson	1	1	1	1.00	0	0	–	–	–	0	0		
James Gibson	1	2	2*	2.00	18	0	–	–	–	0	0	Also played for Scotland.	
William Giles	2	80	55	20.00	218	3	2/58	2/58	47.33	1	0		
C. M. Ismail	1	50	31	25.00	20	2	2/11	2/11	5.50	0	0		
Charles McCarthy	2	73	48	18.25	30	1	1/33	1/33	33.00	0	0	Also played first-class cricket for the British Army.	
C. A. Murad	1	58	34	29.00	90	1	1/33	1/33	–	1	0		
H. G. Nicolson	2	71	37	17.75	0	-	-	-	–	0	0		
M. B. Padgett	1	1	1*	-	132	2	2/75	2/75	37.50	0	0		
George Smith	1	0	0	0.00	156	5	5/94	5/94	19.60	0	0		
Granville Streatfeild	2	34	18	11.33	0	0	–	–	–	0	0	Also played for Cambridge University.	
Sydney Stubbs	1	49	41	24.50	0	0	–	–	–	0	0		
