= List of cricket grounds in Burma =

This is a list of cricket grounds in Burma (also known as Myanmar). Cricket in Burma dates back to when Burma was a province of British India. The British brought the game there, as they did to the rest of India, and the game progressed to the level where the Marylebone Cricket Club played two two-day first class matches there on a tour to India in 1926/27, although as with most colonial teams of the day, the Burmese teams were composed of British officials. The grounds included in this list are reflective of those two matches, having held a first-class match, representing the only time first-class matches have been played in Burma.

Official name (known as)	City or town	Capacity	Notes	Ref
BAA Ground	Rangoon	Unknown	Held a single first-class match when Burma played the touring Marylebone Cricket Club in 1927	
Gymkhana Ground	Rangoon	Unknown	Held a single first-class match when Rangoon Gymkhana played the touring Marylebone Cricket Club in 1927	
