= Sport in Myanmar =

Myanmar has several sports, with some of them having come during British rule.

== History ==
=== Modern era ===
During British rule, efforts were made to civilise the local people, with British sports identified as one way to aid in this process. After independence in 1948, nation-building initiatives and the desire to unite the people using the native culture led to chinlone being adapted as the national sport.

== Team sports ==
=== Basketball ===
Burma has a basketball team, which qualified for the Asian Games in the past.

=== Football ===
Football is the most popular sport in Myanmar. Similar to football, chinlone (Burmese: ခြင်းလုံး) is an indigenous sport that utilises a rattan ball and is played using mainly the feet and the knees, but the head and also the arms may be used except the hands.

=== Equestrian ===
Equestrian events were held by the royal army in the time of the Burmese kings in the month of Pyatho (December/January).

== Less popular sports ==
=== British rule ===
Cricket in Myanmar dates back to when Burma was a province of British India. The British brought the game there, as they did to the rest of India, and the game progressed to the level where the Marylebone Cricket Club played two two-day first class matches there on a tour to India in 1926/1927. The first of these was played at the Gymkhana ground in Rangoon against a Rangoon Gymkhana cricket team. That game was drawn with the MCC on top after forcing the home side to follow-on. The second game was against the Burma team themselves at the BAA Ground, also in Rangoon. The MCC won this game restricting Burma to low scores in both their innings, and only having to chase 7 runs to win in their second innings. These remains the country's only first class games.

== See also ==
- Burmese martial arts
