= Phyu Gyi =

Burmese boxer and champion

- Born: ဦးဖြူကြီး Kyet Tu Yway village, Thaton Township, Mon State
- Died: Thaton, Mon State
- Native name: ဖြူကြီး
- Other names: သထုံဖြူကြီး
- Nationality: Burmese
- Style: Lethwei
- Fighting out of: Thaton
- Rank: First class
- Years active: 1950's-1970's

Other information
- Children: Shwe War Tun; Tin Aung; Aung Win
- Notable relatives: Phyu Lay (Brother); Kyaw Zin Latt (Cousin); Nadi Wint War (Granddaughter)

Phyu Gyi (Burmese: ဖြူကြီး) was a Burmese boxer and Lethwei fighter from Burma. He is a former multiple-time flag champion.

== Career ==
In March 1957, Phyu Gyi participated in an event at Aung San Stadium alongside boxers such as Toe Lone, Pyi Taw Sein and Pann Ta Pwint. It was organized by the Shwe Sunn Nyo Boxing Promotion Association and was notable because some of the fights would include new rules, to match international boxing standards. This meant that the fight wa sunder boxing rules and fighters wore of gloves and no timeout, and no kicks, knees or headbutts were allowed. The event was attended by fans and officials but the matches under the boxing rules were no success as the fighters were too tired and fought awkwardly due to the heavy gloves.

On the second and last day of the event, in the main event and the most anticipated match of the night, Phyu Gyi squared off against Toe Lone under Lethwei rules. Toe Lone was able to pull off one of his signature flying knees, dislocating Phyu Gyi's right arm. He had to be assisted out of the ring. Dissatisfaction among the spectators grew as the medical staff on duty seemed to care less about injured fighters and failed to sufficiently care for them.

On December 26, 1959, it was announced that Phyu Gyi would participate in the Lethwei flag tournament for the 12th anniversary of Independence in Rangoon starting on January 4. The event would feature both professional boxing, with members of the Burmese national boxing team, and Burmese boxing.

=== Boxing ===
In October 1960, around 20 Burmese fighters joined other sports teams as part of a cultural mission on a trip to China. They fought in 10 cities including Beijing, Xiangying, Nanjing, Shanghai, Guangzhou and Kunming. Their tour started on October 5. They were part of another trade mission and a delegation that consisted of Prime Minister U Nu, General Ne Win and defence staff who were there to sign a Sino-Burmese boundary treaty with Chinese Premier Zhou Enlai. In the September 8 issue of The Rangoon Daily, Kyar Ba Nyein recaps the selection event that was held at Aung San Indoor Stadium in order to select the boxers who'd travel to China. His selection included Maung Lone, One Dollar, Bo Kyaw, Phyu Gyi, Toe Lone & Bo Lay in first class; Phyu Lay, Shu Ma Wa, Sein Lone, Sein Hmyin and Sein Win in second class; Hla Shwe, Kyaung Thar, Byauk, Bo Sein and Daung Nyo in third class.

In December 1964, Kyar Ba Nyein was once again tasked with bringing famous boxers to Rangoon for the 17th anniversary of Independence. The event was held at Kennedy Island from January 3 to January 8, 1965. A December 27 article in Light of Burma reported that Pat Lone (Kyondoe), Phyu Gyi (Thaton), Toe Lone, Maung Lone & Sein Lone (Mawlamyine) among many others would participate. Phyu Gyi defeated Bo Kalay on January 5, and eventually faced Sein Lone in the finals on January 9.

From February 26 to March 4, 1965, a flag tournament celebrating Peasants' Day took place at Rangoon Kyaikkasan Stadium. In the finals of the tournament Phyu Gyi defeated Toe Lone from Mawlamyine for a cash prize of 500Kyats.

From January 3 to January 8, 1966, a Lethwei event at Kennedy Island celebrating the 18th anniversary of Independence took place in Rangoon. It was announced that both Phyu Gyi and Tine Lone Kyaw would both bring in a group of fighters to participate. Phyu Gyi, contesting for the first class flag himself, had a match with Patma Sein on January 5.

At the Shwemawdaw Pagoda festival in Pegu from April 1 to April 8, 1966, both western (English) boxing and Burmese boxing were on display. Well-known boxers Chit Sayar, Phyu Gyi, Phyu Lay, Shu Ma Wa, Tin Shwe, Hla Shwe, Patma Sein and Talaing Sein participated alongside Kyaung Thar who had won the "trophy" previously in 1965. At the event a Sports Committee took the opportunity to speak with the participating boxers on how to preserve Burmese boxing culture and achieve a higher standard for the sport among other things. Their report was submitted to the Yangon Sports and Physical Education Committee.

For the 1966 May Day festivities from April 26 until May 1, the Sports and Physical Education Committee organized an event at Kyaikkasan Stadium. This was the first edition of the Labour Day event, and was added to current recurring annual events (Independence Day, Peasants' Day & Union Day) to promote Burmese boxing. Phyu Gyi and Phyu Kalay from Thaton, Maung Lone and Sein Lone from Khayar village & One Dollar and Mae Gyi from Win Ka Mawt village were challenged by next generation first class boxers like Hla Shwe (Pwe Tine Kyaw), Tin Shwe Gyi (Luu Ma Yway) and Kyaung Thar (Hpa-an). It is known that Phyu Gyi faced Sein Lay Tin from second class in one of the preliminary matches, but did not end up winning the flag on May 1. That honour went to Hla Shwe who was promoted to first class this year.

On December 29, 1969, Kyar Ba Nyein visited Mawlamyine, Thaton and Hpa-an to mobilise boxers from the southeastern region for participation in the upcoming Independence Day event. Phyu Gyi, Hla Shwe, Kyaung Thar, Sein Lone, Moe Kyoe, Chit Sayar, Myawaddy Than Shwe, Aung Myint Sein and others took part. The event was held at Thein Pyu Stadium in Rangoon.

== Personal life ==
Phyu Gyi was the son of wrestler U Gani and Daw Saw She. He was a muslim and had seven children. Three of them also enjoyed a fighting career, of which Tun Win known as Shwe War Tun is the most notable. The 1963 second class and 1967 first class Independence Day flag champion Phyu Lay, sometimes referred to as Phyu Kalay, is the younger brother of Phyu Gyi. He died of old age at the age of 71 in his hometown Thaton.

== Titles and accomplishments ==
- Tournaments
  - First class flag champion; Armed Forces Day (Mawlamyine) (March 1966)
  - First class flag champion; Peasants' Day (March 1965)
  - First class flag champion; 17th anniversary of Independence (January 1965)
  - First class flag champion; Karen State Day Hpa-an (November 1960)

== Lethwei record ==
Professional Lethwei record (Incomplete)
17 fights, 9 wins (9 (T)KOs), 6 losses, 1 draw
Date	Result	Opponent	Event	Location	Method	Round	Time
1966-04-29		(Myanmar) Sein Lay Tin (Win Ka Mawt)	May Day (Labor Day), Kyaikkasan Stadium	Rangoon, Burma			
1966-01-05	Win	(Myanmar) Patma Sein (Hpar Kat)	Independence Day, Kennedy Island	Rangoon, Burma	KO		
1965-03-04	Win	(Myanmar) Toe Lone (Mawlamyine)	Peasants' Day, Kyaikkasan Stadium	Rangoon, Burma	KO		
1965-01-09	Win	(Myanmar) Sein Lone (Mawlamyine)	Independence Day, Kennedy Island	Rangoon, Burma	KO		
1965-01-05	Win	(Myanmar) Bo Kalay (Hlaingbwe)	Independence Day, Kennedy Island	Rangoon, Burma	KO		
1964-01-09	Loss	(Myanmar) Sein Lone (Mawlamyine)	Final, Independence Day, Kennedy Island	Rangoon, Burma	KO	2	
1964-01-09	Win	(Myanmar) Maung Lone (Khayar)	Semi final, Independence Day, Kennedy Island	Rangoon, Burma	TKO	4	
1963-01-07	Loss	(Myanmar) Toe Lone (Mawlamyine)	Independence Day, Kennedy Island	Rangoon, Burma	KO	2	
1961-03-25	Loss	(Myanmar) Mae Gyi (Hlaingbwe)	Grand Tournament, Aung San Stadium	Rangoon, Burma			
1960-11-09	Win	(Myanmar) Bo Kyaw (Thaton)	Karen State Day	Hpa-an, Burma	TKO		
1960-11-08	Win	(Myanmar) Mae Gyi (Hlaingbwe)	Karen State Day	Hpa-an, Burma	TKO		
1960-09-05	Loss	(Myanmar) One Dollar (Hlaingbwe)	PRC Selections, Aung San Stadium	Rangoon, Burma	TKO	1	
1960-09-03	Win	(Myanmar) Thaung Shwe (Hlaingbwe)	PRC Selections, Aung San Stadium	Rangoon, Burma	KO	3	
1959-10-21	Loss	(Myanmar) Maung Lone (Khayar)	Kyaikkhami Yele Pagoda Festival	Kyaikkhami, Burma	TKO		
1959-10-20	Win	(Myanmar) Nagar	Kyaikkhami Yele Pagoda Festival	Kyaikkhami, Burma	TKO	4	45:00
1957-03-10	Loss	(Myanmar) Toe Lone (Mawlamyine)	Challenge fights, Aung San Stadium	Rangoon, Burma	TKO		
1957-03-09	Draw	(Myanmar) Maung Lone (Khayar)	Challenge fights, Aung San Stadium	Rangoon, Burma	Draw		
