= Burma cricket team =

Cricket team in India (1927)

Team information
- Founded: 1894
- Last match: 1927
- Home ground: BAA Ground, Rangoon

History
- First-class debut: MCC in 1927 at BAA Ground

The Burma cricket team was an Indian cricket team which represented the province of Burma in British India.

== Beginnings and First-class debut ==
Burma played minor matches against touring Europeans teams which visited colonial India and Ceylon in 1894 and 1912, until their first-class debut in 1927. The players also played for the Rangoon Gymkhana cricket team which sometimes participated in the Calcutta Triangular Tournament. Burma also played against the Straits Settlements in the Interport matches from 1906 to 1909.

Burma played a single first-class match in January 1927 at the BAA Ground against the touring Marylebone Cricket Club (MCC), resulting in a win for MCC. The team was captained by Hubert Ashton, the Cambridge University and Essex batsman. The team consisted of British expatriates and Indians CA Murad and AE Bham who had played in the Bombay Quadrangular tournament.

== Decline ==
Following the partition of Burma from British India and its creation as a separate crown colony, the sport took a backseat and faded out due to the loss of patronage from the British elites and Indian community after Burmese independence. Cricket remained a minority sport in the country until 2006 when Myanmar became an affiliate member of the International Cricket Council.

== Notable players ==
- Hubert Ashton
- Herbert Aston
- FitzAlan Drayson
- Basil Eddis
- Frank Garnett
- Charles McCarthy
