= Herbert Aston =

Irish cricketer (1885–1968)

Personal information
- Full name: Herbert Reid Aston
- Born: 15 May 1885; Dublin, Ireland
- Died: 27 January 1968 (aged 82); Rathcoole, Leinster, Ireland
- Relatives: John Aston (brother)

Career statistics
Competition	First-class
Matches	2
Runs scored	32
Batting average	10.66
100s/50s	0/0
Top score	22
Balls bowled	204
Wickets	2
Bowling average	78.00
5 wickets in innings	0
10 wickets in match	0
Best bowling	2/106
Catches/stumpings	1/–
- Source: Cricinfo, 8 November 2018

Herbert Reid Aston (15 May 1885 – 27 January 1968) was an Irish first-class cricketer.

Born at Dublin in May 1885, Aston was educated in the city at Wesley College, before going up to Trinity College to study engineering. While studying at Trinity, he played rugby union for Dublin University Football Club. His performances led to his selection for Ireland in 1908, with him playing two Test matches in the Home Nations Championship against England at Richmond, and Wales at Belfast. He played club cricket for Clontarf, after he was persuaded to join over rivals Pembroke by the club.

After graduating from Trinity with an engineering degree, Aston's work took him to different parts of the British Empire. He worked on reconstruction of the Mandalay Canal in Burma in 1917, and served in the British Indian Army during the First World War as a lieutenant in the cavalry reserve. By the mid-1920s, Aston was an executive engineer with the Burma Public Works Department. He still played cricket when working in Burma, playing two first-class matches against the Marylebone Cricket Club in January 1927 at Rangoon; the first came for Rangoon Gymkhana at the Gymkhana Ground, while the second came for Burma at the BAA Ground. He scored 32 runs in these matches, as well as taking 2 wickets.

He later returned to Ireland, where he took up rugby refereeing and golf. He worked on the River Shannon at Limerick as a river inspector, before resigning in 1936 to move to Dublin to work alongside his brother at his engineering firm, taking over as chairman upon his death. Aston died at Rathcoole in Leinster in January 1968. He was survived by his wife (who died just six weeks later), two daughters and one son. His brother, John Aston, also played first-class cricket. His nephew was a victim of the 1952 Aer Lingus crash on Mount Snowdon.
