= Wesley College, Dublin =

Private school in Dún Laoghaire–Rathdown, Republic of Ireland

Wesley College Dublin
- Coláiste Wesley

Location
- Ballinteer; Dublin, Dún Laoghaire–Rathdown, Leinster; Ireland; 53.279559°N 6.24193°W

Information
- Former name: Wesleyan Connexional School (1845-1879)
- School type: Private day and boarding school
- Motto: πάντα δὲ δοκιμάζετε, τὸ καλὸν κατέχετε (panta de dokimazete, to kalon katechete; (Greek) (Prove all things; hold fast to that which is good. (1 Thes 5:21))
- Denomination: Methodist
- Established: 1 October 1845; 181 years ago
- Founder: Methodist Church in Ireland
- Status: Open
- School board: The Board of Directors
- School number: 61010U
- Principal: Mr. Brian Moore
- Chaplain: Rev. Ruth Mathews
- Teaching staff: 100
- Grades: 6-12
- Gender: Coeducational (Co-Ed)
- Age range: 11-18
- Enrollment: 942 (2025/26)
- Hours in school day: 7-8 hours
- Campus size: 50 acres (200,000 m^{2}) (original size) 41.17 acres (166,600 m^{2})
- Campus type: Pavilion
- Houses: Epworth (girls) Embury (boys)
- Colours: Navy & Red
- Sports: Rugby; Basketball; Badminton; Hockey; Cricket; Tennis
- Mascot: Wyvern
- Newspaper: Eaglet (19th April, 1862-) (More information below), Wesley College Quarterly (1882-1937 or 1947) (Date is disputed), The Wesley College Magazine (1947-1969), Wesley College Annual (1970-??), Full Stop (2004-
- School fees: Day Tuition - Secondary €7,480 Day Tuition - Preparatory €9,050 5 Day Boarding (inclusive of tuition fee) €17,425 7 Day Boarding (inclusive of tuition fee) €18,930 Day Boarding (5th and 6th Year Students only) €3,665
- Nobel laureates: George Bernard Shaw; Ernest Walton
- Website: www.wesleycollege.ie
- A copy of the 'Eaglet' is in the Wesley Archive according to Page 42 of the 1962 History Book by R. Lee Cole. It is dated Issue 5, May 17th 1862, the Eaglet published every Saturday, therefore, the first edition was the 19th of April, 1862
- Last updated: 05/02/2026

Wesley College is a private co-educational secondary school for day and boarding students in Ballinteer, County Dublin, Ireland. Wesley College is under the control of a Board of Governors, appointed each year by the Methodist Church in Ireland.

Wesley College was founded on 1 October 1845 and counts two Nobel laureates among its alumni. Strong emphasis is put on religious education for all denominations and both extra-curricular activities and sport play an important part in this school. The college offers pupils an opportunity to explore the humanities, sciences, technology, business studies, English literature, music and the arts. Wesley College offers a range of extracurricular and sporting activities in the belief that these assist a "sound general education and contribute to the whole person".

== History ==
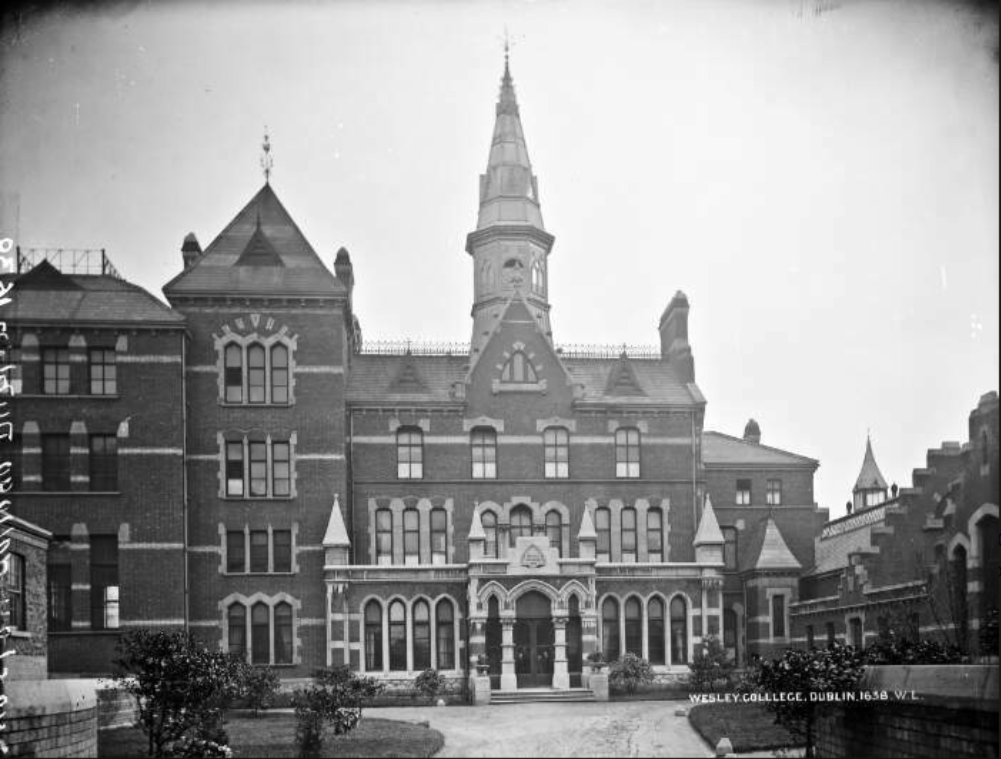
Wesley College, Dublin (1879–1969)

=== Origins ===
On 16 May 1844, a gathering of men met in Belfast and agreed to form a Wesleyan Proprietary Grammar School in Ireland "for the purpose of affording a thorough literary, scientific and commercial education, with a sound, religious, and moral training, in strict accordance with the principles of Wesleyan Methodism".

The committee originally proposed a boarding and day school for boys, in the vicinity of Belfast but later decided that the Wesleyan Connexional School should be established in Dublin which was the hub of Ireland's transport system and had a far greater population. A large dilapidated dwelling house, No. 79 St. Stephen's Green, sited on what is now part of the Department of Foreign Affairs, was leased from the trustees of The King's Hospital.

The Wesleyan Connexional School was founded in 1845 in St. Stephen's Green, Dublin by a group of Methodist Ministers and other men for the Methodist Community in Ireland. In 1879 the Methodist Conference granted the request of the School's Trustees that it would be named Wesley College.

=== Development ===
In June 1911 the Wesley College Trustees put the following proposal to the Methodist Conference, "This committee, having had the fact brought under their notice that at the present time there is no school in the three southern provinces under the Methodist Management offering to girls the advantages of an Intermediate education, suggests to the Conference that the present is a suitable occasion for opening Wesley College to girls who desire to secure such training as will fit them for professional and business careers". The Conference responded favourably and the Trustees purchased No. 110 St. Stephen's Green as a girls' hostel. It had formerly been known as "The Epworth Club", a boarding house for young Epworth business men coming to Dublin, which had ceased to serve its purposes. The hostel was called Epworth House.

Six boarder girls and fifteen day-girls, together with the new boys, joined the 175 (approximately) boys to increase the number to 311 in 1914 who joined in September 1911.

Right up to the 1940s co-education was narrowly interpreted and strictly supervised. The boys were always called by their surnames, while the girls had their surnames prefixed by "Miss". Casual conversation between the boys and girls was discouraged and they did not have meals together until the 1950s.

=== Move to Ballinteer ===
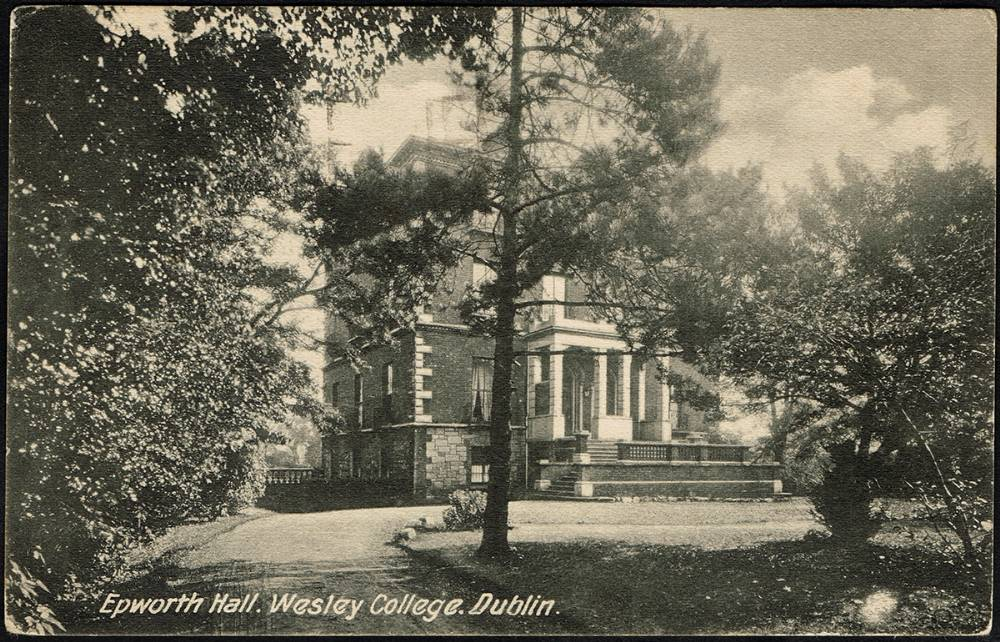
Epworth Hall, Appian Way, Dublin 2

In 1969 Wesley College sold its boarding house buildings at Appian Way in Dublin to Fitzwilliam Lawn Tennis Club. Its other boarding house buildings and grounds at Burlington Road and Leeson Street Upper were also sold to property developers to form the site on which was later to be constructed the Burlington Hotel. This included the former Tullamaine House, Burlington House and Burleigh House.

The school then moved to its present 50 acres (200,000 m^{2}) site in Ballinteer, a suburb of Dublin, at the foothills of the Dublin mountains. The final school activity on the old College site was the end-of-year service in the Large Schoolroom on 14 June 1969, followed by a celebration of Holy Communion in the chapel. The official opening and dedication of the new buildings at Ludford Park had taken place at 3.00 p.m. on Saturday, 7 June 1969, opened by Éamon de Valera, President of Ireland.

The 1969 campus was added to in 1980, 1987, and 1991. A library and information technology building was added in 1999 and a new music and arts centre was opened in 2005. In 2016, a new sports centre began construction and in 2019, the centre was opened.

Christopher Woods announced his retirement in 2024 and Brian Moore succeed him starting from the academic year of 2024–2025. Brian Moore is a past Wesley Student and was the principal of Rathdown School in Thomastown.

== School coat of arms ==
Old school coat of arms

In 1969, the college obtained from the Chief Herald an official grant of arms, which replaced that previously used. The upper part of the shield has a red ground, and bears the Bible, surmounted by a Maltese cross, an old Wesley College symbol. To the right is an escallop shell from the arms of John Wesley's family. The lower part of the shield has a blue ground and on it a flaming castle from the Dublin City arms. The scroll below the shield contains the college motto in Greek, "Prove all things; hold fast that which is good." (I Thessalonians 5.21)

== List of Headmasters & Principals ==
The Wesleyan Connexional School (1845–1879)
Governor & Chaplin		Headmaster	
Rev. Dr. Robinson Scott	1845-55	Mr. Alcorn	1845-47
Rev. Dr. Robert Masaroon	1855-57	Dr. Henry V. Hennings	1847-52
Rev. Dr. Robert Crook	1857-62	Dr. Frederick R. Smith	1852-67
Rev. George Chambers	1862-63	Dr. Henry R. Parker	1867-71
Rev. Dr. Thomas A. McKee	1864-91	Dr. Maxwell McIntosh	1871-91

The Wesley College (1879-)
Principal		Chaplain	
Rev. Dr. Samuel Hollingsworth	1891-98	Rev. Nigel Mackey	2001-2025
Rev. William Crawford, M.A.	1899-1910	Rev. Ruth Matthews	2025-
Rev. Dr. Thomas J. Irwin	1910-45		
Rev. Mortimer Temple, M.A.	1945-47		
Rev. Gerald G. Myles, M.A., B.D	1947-72		
Dr. David Laingridge	1972-73		
Mr. William G. Kirkpatrick, M.A.	1973-77		
Mr. Kennith G. Blackmore, M.A.	1977-96		
Mr. J. W. Harris M.A., M.Litt., Ph.D., H.Dip. Ed	??-2003		
Mr. Don Lewis (acting)	2003-2004		
Mr. Christopher Woods	2004-2024		
Mr. Brian Moore	2024-		

== Extracurricular activities ==
Extracurricular activities include drama, debating (where speakers have recently achieved international honours), Amnesty International, Christian Union, and many others.

In 2010 Carin Hunt, a fifth year, travelled to Qatar as part of the Irish debating team for the World's Debating. Former student Mark Haughton was the Irish Team's debating coach, and had achieved second as part of the Irish team, in the World's Debating while at Wesley. Carin went on to captain the team in the School's finals in Dundee the following year, taking them to the semi-finals.

Wesley has won the All Ireland hockey trophy. The school places an emphasis on activities intended to help others. Students in Transition year are able to reach out in various ways such as classroom assistance, helping children with special needs and music teaching. In recent years a team from Wesley's Transition year has embarked on a Habitat for Humanity house building trip annually.

The students of the college also produce a newspaper, Full Stop four times a year, which has been providing a voice for students since December 2003.

=== MUN ===
Another notable activity is Model United Nations (MUN) Wesley has been recognized multiple times with the best delegate, best Jr./Sr. Delegate etc. Wesley also hosts their own MUN conference (WCDMUN) during the course of the year.

=== Rugby ===
From the beginning, Rugby Union has been the main competitive team sport for boys in the school. The school won the Leinster Schools Rugby Senior Cup in 1898 and the Senior league final in 2000. The Senior Cup team have played in the Vincent Murray Cup final on five occasions; winning in 2002, 2013, 2015 and 2018 and losing the final in 2009. In 2018 the school won their first junior trophy beating Kilkenny College the Fr Godfrey final.

Wesley has produced a number of provincial and international rugby players including Josh van der Flier and Eric Miller.

Rugby Honours

- Leinster Schools Rugby Senior Cup - 1898
- Leinster Schools Rugby Senior League - 2000, 2025
- Leinster Schools Vinnie Murray Cup - 2002, 2013, 2015, 2018 (Runners Up: 2009)
- Leinster Schools Fr Godrey Cup - 2018

=== Interschools Music Festival ===
Each year Wesley hosts one of the largest interschools music festivals in the country. Hundreds of students from many schools, both primary and secondary level, compete in individual and choral singing as well as individual instrumental and orchestral. In 2010, the school built a dedicated Music and Arts Centre. Included in this centre is the purpose built G. B. Shaw Auditorium, named after one of Wesley's most famous past pupils.

=== Lifelines ===
In 1992, the college published its fourth, and final, instalment of the Lifelines anthology. The earlier instalments were published in 1985, 1988 and 1990 by The Underground Press Ltd, Wesley College. Under format of the anthologies, a panel of students within Wesley write to notable people, such as celebrities, sports people and world leaders, asking them to highlight their favourite poem with a brief explanation for their choosing. Thus far the anthology has raised over €140,000 for Irish charity Concern. The latest edition itself has raised €29,000 and was honoured as the Best Irish Published Book of the Year, in the 2007 Irish Book Awards. In 2010, The National Library of Ireland purchased the original letters that were included in the original 1985 edition of Lifelines. Subsequently, Wesley College donated all correspondence, photographs and other related archival material to the Library. The Discover Lifelines exhibition in the Library's main hall showed letters from this archive from writers, poets, actors, artists, media personalities and politician and ran throughout 2010. A collective edition of the anthology was published by Town House, Dublin, in 1992.

=== Senior Choir ===
The Senior Choir at Wesley College Dublin received a number of awards during the term 2011/2012, including the All Ireland School Choir Competition. This was broadcast on live RTÉ television. The choir also won both of their competitions in that year's Feis Ceol in Dublin. They have appeared on the Late Late Show on RTÉ as well as on RTÉ Radio One on Pat Kenny's morning show.

== Wartime contribution ==
War memorial

WW2 memorial

Wesley, like many other schools in Ireland, contributed to the effort of the two major world wars. Over 85 students of the college died in the First World War. Their names are listed on a memorial in the college concourse which reads "This building was erected to the honour of all old boys of this College who ventured their lives for defence of home and country in the Great War and especially in loving and grateful memory of those who fell". (The building mentioned was the old College Chapel, where the memorial was located before the move to Ballinteer.) 25 students of Wesley, including one German, died between 1939 and 1945 in the Second World War. These are also listed on a memorial in the main concourse. Remembrance Day is marked each year with the laying of a wreath on the memorial.

== Notable past pupils ==
=== Politics and government ===
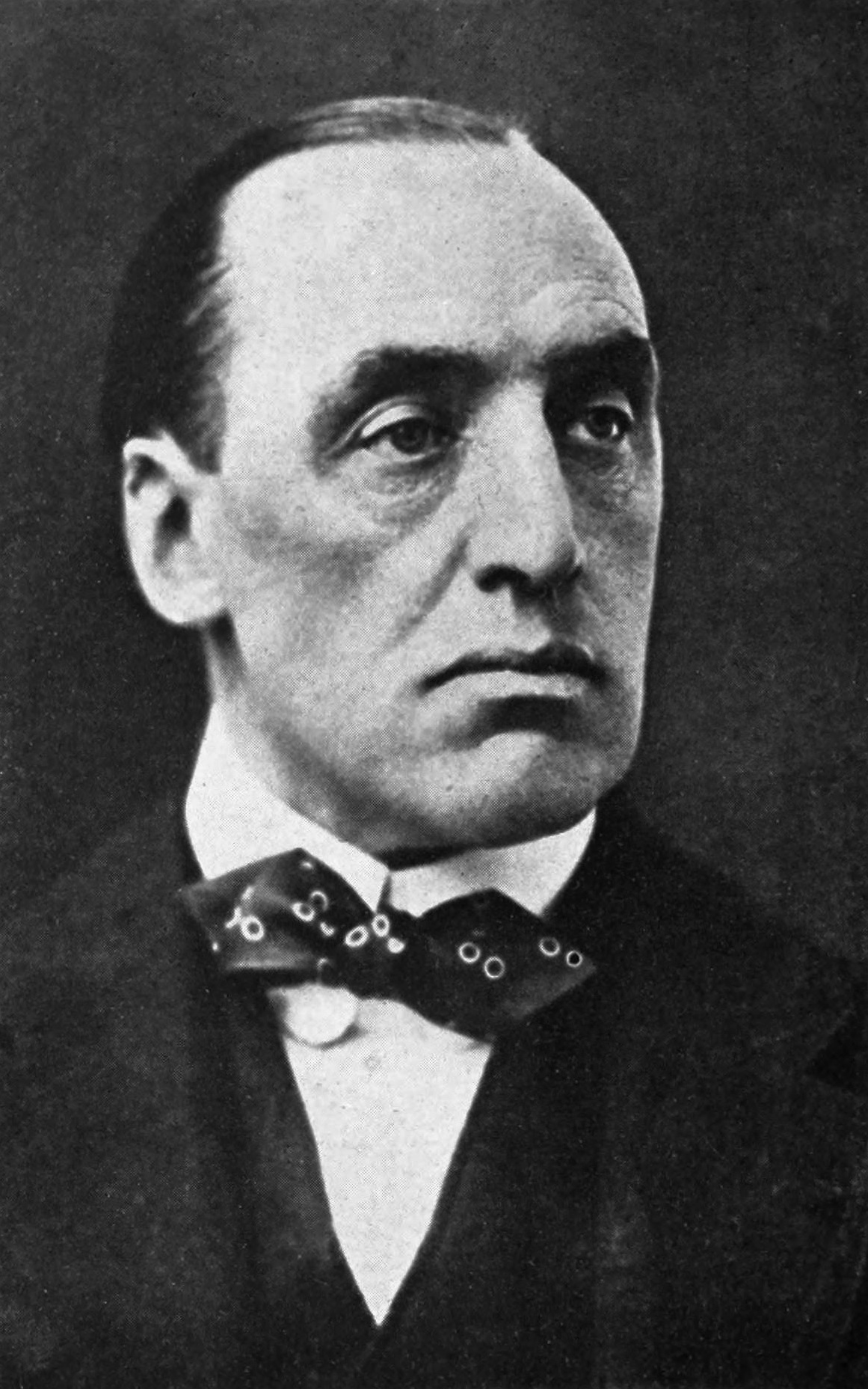
Baron Carson, Wesley College past pupil

- Lionel Booth, TD
- Sir Edward Carson, barrister and MP, Leader of the Ulster Unionist Party 1910-21
- Henry Flavelle Forbes, C.I.E., President of the Court of Appeal, Iraq, 1920/21
- Sir Robert Henry Woods MP, ENT Surgeon, President of the Royal College of Surgeons in Ireland 1910–11
- Sir Robert Hart, 1st Baronet, Inspector General of China's Imperial Maritime Custom Service (1863)
- Chaim Herzog, sixth President of Israel
- William McMillan, and Australian politician and businessman.
- H. B. Higgins, Attorney General of the Australian Government in 1904
- Sir Harold J. Maguire, Director-General of Intelligence at the British Ministry of Defence (1968–1972)
- Mervyn Taylor, TD, Minister for Equality and Law Reform
- Senator Gordon Wilson
- Neale Richmond TD, also served as Senator
- Lt.Col. Claude Percy Fisher MRCVS, RAVC, Director of Veterinary Services, Anglo-Egyptian Sudan

=== Music and the arts ===
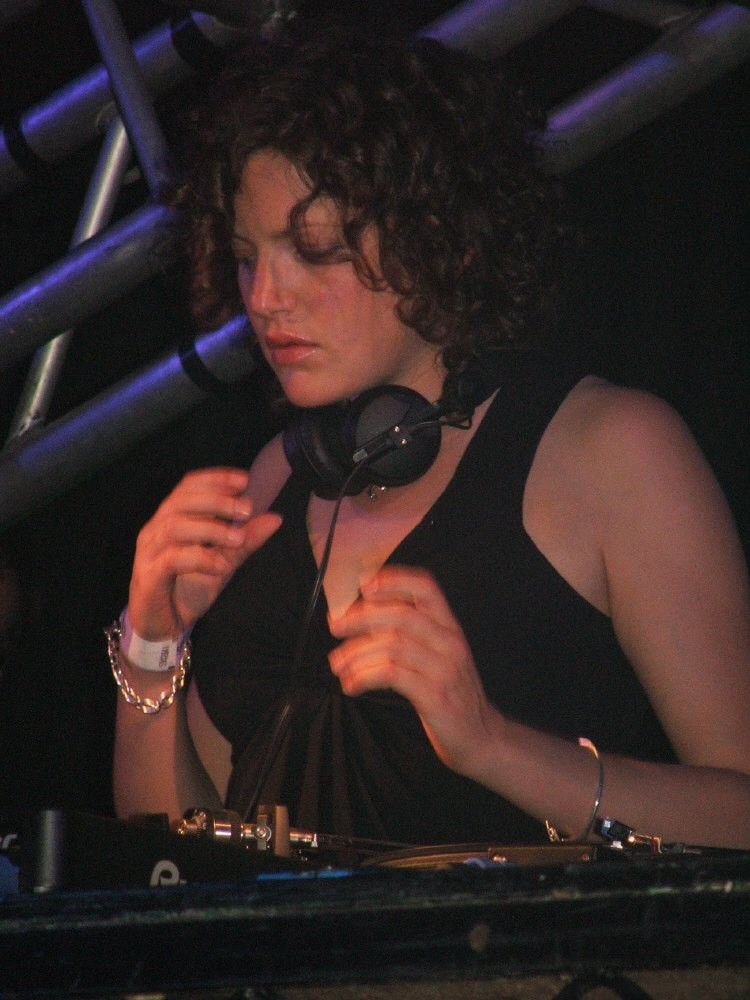
Broadcaster Annie Mac, Wesley College past pupil

- Harry Furniss, caricaturist
- David Kitt and Robbie Kitt, members of the band Spilly Walker
- Sarimah Ibrahim, Malaysian actress and singer
- Annie Mac, BBC Radio 1 DJ
- Niall Morris, tenor, member of the Celtic Tenors
- Eva O'Connor, theatre actress who was nominated for Best Supporting Actress in the 2009 Irish Times Theatre Awards
- Stanley Townsend, television, film and stage actor (in the BBC's Rough Diamond and other dramas)
- Heather Jones, Professor of Modern and Contemporary European History, University College London
- Mark McCabe, music producer, remixer and Radio DJ for RTE 2FM. Best known for releasing Maniac 2000 that is the number two best selling record ever in Ireland
- Judi Dench, parents went to Wesley before moving to the UK
- Louisa Harland, actress best known for her role in sitcom 'Derry Girls'

=== Science ===
- John Widdess, biologist, journal editor and medical historian
- Kenneth Wolfe, Professor of Genomic Evolution, UCD School of Medicine and UCD Conway Institute, University College Dublin

=== Business and philanthropy ===
- Philip Berber, former CEO of Cybercorp and multimillionaire philanthropist, Chairman of A Glimmer of Hope Foundation
- Richard Burrows, Chairman of British American Tobacco, former Governor of the Bank of Ireland
- Frederick Keppel, Irish-American art dealer

=== Clergy ===
- Michael Burrows, Bishop of Cashel and Ossory
- Donald Caird, Archbishop of Dublin
- Richard Clarke, Archbishop of Armagh, Primate of Ireland
- Frank Johnston, head of the Royal Army Chaplains' Department, British Army

=== Nobel laureates ===
- George Bernard Shaw, playwright, Nobel Prize for Literature
- Ernest Walton, Nobel Prize for Physics.

=== Sporting alumni ===
Former Wesley College students have represented Ireland at international level in a number of sports.

==== Rugby Union ====
(British & Irish Lions) British and Irish Lions

- Eric Miller
- Josh van der Flier

Ireland

- Herbert Aston
- Eric Miller
- Josh van der Flier

==== Cricket ====
Ireland men's internationals

- John Aston
- Keith Bailey
- Mike Halliday
- Sonny Hool
- Ken Hope
- Louis Jacobson
- Mervyn Jaffey
- Bob Lambert
- Jason Molins
- Edward Moore
- Eddie Richardson

Ireland women's internationals

- Lara Molins
- Nikki Squire
- Nikki Symmons
- Julie van der Flier

==== Association football ====
Republic of Ireland men's internationals

- Fred Horlacher

Republic of Ireland women's internationals

- Sylvia Gee

==== Field hockey ====
Ireland men's internationals

- Michael 'Mitch' Darling
- Kyle Good
- Kirk Shimmins

Ireland women's internationals

- Nikki Symmons

==== Cycling ====
Ireland men's internationals

- Janos Köhler - Red Bull Road Rage

Ireland women's internationals

- Lara Gillespie

==== Olympians ====
(Republic of Ireland) Ireland

- Lara Gillespie; cycling – 2024 Paris
- Scott Evans; badminton – 2008 Beijing, 2012 London, 2016 Rio
- Michael Darling; field hockey – 2016
- Kyle Good; field hockey – 2016
- Kirk Shimmins; field hockey – 2016
- Nick Sweeney; discus thrower – 1992, 1996, 2000, 2004
- David Wilkins; sailing – 1972, 1976, 1980, 1988, 1992

== See also ==
- Old Wesley
