= Kyaung Thar =

Burmese boxer and champion

- Kyaung Thar in 1963
- Born: Sein Tin; Hton Aing village, Hpa-an Township, Karen State
- Native name: စိန်တင်
- Other names: Pekin Pyan Kyaung Thar (ပီကင်းပြန်ကျောင်းသား); Hpa-an Kyaung Thar (ဖါးအံကျောင်းသား); Hton Aing Kyaung Thar (ထုံးအိုင်ကျောင်းသား)
- Nationality: Burmese
- Style: Lethwei
- Fighting out of: Hpa-an & Mawlamyine
- Rank: First class
- Years active: 1950's-1970's

Kyaung Thar (Burmese: ကျောင်းသား) was a Burmese boxer. He is a former multiple-time flag champion and gold medalist.

== Lethwei career ==
In September 1960, around 20 boxers joined other sports teams as part of a cultural mission on a trip to China. Some boxers who came back from the trip were branded as 'ပီကင်းပြန်' meaning 'returned from Beijing', including Kyaung Thar. The Burmese boxers joined a cultural mission alongside Prime Minister U Nu who was there to sign a Sino-Burmese boundary treaty with Chinese Premier Zhou Enlai.

In 1963, Kyaung Thar was featured in a January issue of Thutti Journal (The Valour). It discussed his rise in second class and a meeting with one of the divisions stars in Hla Shwe for the upcoming Independence Day event at Kennedy Island in Rangoon.

In 1964, he was featured in a lengthy article for Light of Burma. The report came from Hpa-an and once more stressed that Kyaung Thar had no competitors left in second class. He had won the second-class flag at this year's Kennedy Island event and was now seen in battles in Hpa-an at the Thay Hta Man Aung Pagoda festival which runs annually from January 26 to January 31. In the second-class final at the Pagoda festival in Hpa-an he beat successful boxer Sat Kalay in round 4 by breaking his hand. After the fight, Kyaung Thar reportedly challenged first-class boxer Sein Lone. Two other encounters with Sat Kalay are mentioned in the article: 1962 in Karen State, which ended in KO; and in 1963, at the Labour Day event in Mawlamyine, where he broke the jaw and arm of Sat Kalay.

On February 13, 1965, he took home 300 Kyats and the second-class flag at the 18th anniversary of Union Day event in Hpa-an, once again defeating Sat Kalay. That same event saw Toe Lone win the first-class flag in the twilight of his career.

A report on the Shwemawdaw Pagoda festival in Pegu from April 1 to April 8, 1966, mentions that Kyaung Thar took part in the first-class flag tournament, and that he was last year's recipient of the second-class flag at this event. Alongside him, boxers Chit Sayar, Phyu Gyi, Phyu Lay, Shu Ma Wa, Tin Shwe, Hla Shwe, Patma Sein and Talaing Sein participated.

== Titles and accomplishments ==
- Tournaments
  - First-class flag champion; 24th anniversary of Independence (January 1972)
  - Second-class flag champion; Shwemawdaw Pagoda festival (April 1965)
  - Second-class flag champion; 18th anniversary of Union Day (February 1965)
  - Second-class flag champion; Thay Hta Man Aung Pagoda festival (January (1964)
  - Second-class flag champion; 16th anniversary of Independence (January 1964)
  - Third-class flag champion; Karen State Day Hpa-an (November 1960)
  - Third-class flag champion; Kyaikkhami Pagoda Festival (October 1959)
- Other accomplishments
  - 11-time receiver of a gold medal in competitions in and outside of Burma by 1964.

== Lethwei record ==
Professional Lethwei record (Incomplete)
18 fights, 12 wins (12 (T)KOs), 3 losses, 2 draws
Date	Result	Opponent	Event	Location	Method	Round	Time
1972-01-11	Win	(Myanmar) Moe Kyoe	Final, Independence Day	Rangoon, Burma	TKO (hand injury)	1	
1970-01-11	Loss	(Myanmar) Sein Lone	Final, Independence Day, Thein Phyu Stadium	Rangoon, Burma	TKO		
1970-01-09	Win	(Myanmar) Hla Shwe	Semi final, Independence Day, Thein Phyu Stadium	Rangoon, Burma	TKO		
1970-01-08		(Myanmar) Phyu Lay	Independence Day, Thein Phyu Stadium	Rangoon, Burma			
1965-04-19	Win	(Myanmar)	Shwemawdaw Pagoda festival	Pegu, Burma			
1965-02-13	Win	(Myanmar) Sat Kalay (Paingkyon)	18th Anniversary of Union Day	Hpa-an, Burma			
1964-01-31	Win	(Myanmar) Sat Kalay (Paingkyon)	Thay Hta Man Aung Pagoda festival	Hpa-an, Burma	TKO	4	
1964-01-09	Win	(Myanmar)	Independence Day, Kennedy Island	Rangoon, Burma			
1964-01-03	Win	(Myanmar) Hla Maung	Independence Day, Kennedy Island	Rangoon, Burma	KO		
1963-05-01	Win	(Myanmar) Sat Kalay (Paingkyon)	Labour Day	Mawlamyine, Burma	TKO		
1963-01-05	Loss	(Myanmar) Phyu Kalay (Thaton)	Independence Day, Kennedy Island	Rangoon, Burma	TKO		
1963-01-03	Draw	(Myanmar) Sat Kalay (Paingkyon)	Independence Day, Kennedy Island	Rangoon, Burma	Draw	4	
1962-00-00	Win	(Myanmar) Sat Kalay (Paingkyon)		Karen State, Burma	KO		
1961-03-24	Win	(Myanmar) Hla Shwe (Thaton)	Challenge fights, Aung San Stadium	Rangoon, Burma	KO	4	
1960-11-09	Win	(Myanmar) Maung Dway (Thaton)	Karen State Day	Hpa-an, Burma	TKO		
1960-11-08	Win	(Myanmar) Shwegun Daung	Karen State Day	Hpa-an, Burma	TKO		
1960-09-03	Draw	(Myanmar) Tin Shwe (Thaton)	Challenge fights, Aung San Stadium	Rangoon, Burma	Draw	4	
1960-01-05	Loss	(Myanmar) Tin Ngwe	Independence Day, Kennedy Island	Rangoon, Burma	TKO		
1959-10-20	Win	(Myanmar) Daung Kalay	Kyaikkhami Yele Pagoda Festival	Kyaikkhami, Burma	TKO	4	
