= John Widdess =

Irish biologist (1906–0982)

- Born: John David Henry Widdess; 1906; Limerick, County Limerick, Ireland
- Died: 1982 (aged 75–76)
- Education: Wesley College, Dublin
- Scientific career
- Fields: Biology

Professor John David Henry Widdess (1906–1982) was an Irish biologist and librarian who was recognized as Ireland's foremost medical historian. His historical publications included books on the histories of institutions such as the Royal College of Surgeons in Ireland (RCSI), the Royal College of Physicians of Ireland (RCPI), and several hospitals. In 1960, he was appointed a professor of biology in RCSI, having been a lecturer and assistant in the physiology department and librarian of the college previously. In 1973, he was awarded the Abraham Colles medal of RCSI, he became an honorary fellow of RCSI and RCPI in 1975 and 1968.

Widdess was born in Limerick in 1906 to Emily and Matthew Widdess. His father was a pharmaceutical chemist. He received his secondary education in Wesley College in Dublin, and proceeded to Trinity College, Dublin, where he received a BA in natural science, an MA, and a Litt.D. In 1931, he became assistant in the department of physiology in RCSI. During this time, he was also appointed clinical biochemist and assistant pathologist of the Richmond hospital. He was appointed lecturer in biology at RCSI in 1938, and professor in 1960. In 1968, he became editor of the Journal of the Royal College of Surgeons in Ireland.

According to Eoin O'Brien, his writing style was "lively and entertaining and, without compromising historical accuracy, was able to blend the humour and sadness of history with a subtlety that was most attractive". In 1949, he wrote The Royal College of Surgeons in Ireland and its medical school. In 1963, A history of the Royal College of Physicians of Ireland 1654–1963 was published, followed by The Richmond, Whitworth & Hardwicke Hospitals. St Lawrence's Dublin 1772–1972 in 1972.

Selected works of J.D.H. Widdess:

- The Royal College of Surgeons in Ireland and its Medical School, 1784–1984. 3rd ed. Dublin: Royal College of Surgeons in Ireland, 1984.
- The Richmond, Whitworth & Hardwicke Hospitals: St. Laurence’s Dublin, 1772–1972. Dublin: 1972.
- The Charitable Infirmary, Jervis Street, Dublin, 1718–1968. Dublin: 1968.
- A history of the Royal College of Physicians of Ireland, 1654–1963. Edinburgh : Livingstone, 1963.
- An index to the biographical notices, papers on the history of medicine, and reviews of books on that subject, which have appeared in the Irish Journal of Medical Science from September, 1916 to December, 1954. Dublin : Irish Journal of Medical Science, 1955.
- An account of the Schools of Surgery: Royal College of Surgeons, Dublin 1789–1948. Edinburgh: Livingstone, 1949.
