= Moe Kyoe =

Burmese boxer and first class champion

- Born: November 6, 1947 (age 77); Kyon Paik village, Hpa-an Township, Hpa-an District, Kayin State, British Burma
- Native name: မိုးကြိုး
- Other names: Mya Shein (မြရှိန်); Maw Tot (မော်တော့); King of Lethwei (လက်ဝှေ့ဘုရင်)
- Nationality: Burmese
- Height: 168 cm (5 ft 6 in)
- Weight: 63 kg (139 lb; 9.9 st)
- Style: Lethwei
- Stance: Orthodox
- Fighting out of: Thaton, Mon State
- Teacher(s): Ko Maung Aye
- Rank: First class
- Years active: 1957-1982 (initial)

Personal life
- Occupation: Buddhist monk

Religious life
- Religion: Buddhism
- Temple: Aung Taw Mu Labamuni Pagoda
- School: Theravada
- Monastic name: U Pyinnyasara (ဦးပညာစာရ)

Senior posting
- Based in: Hpa-an Township, Hpa-an District, Kayin State

Moe Kyoe (Burmese: မိုးကြိုး; MLCTS: mui:krui:; IPA: [mód͡ʑó]) (born November 6, 1947) is a retired Burmese lethwei fighter and first class flag champion, known for his endurance and speed. He was a key figure in changing the match format and kickstart in the national champions era. After his career as a Burmese boxer he entered monkhood in 1998.

== Early life ==
Moe Kyoe was born on November 6, 1947, son of U Ngwe Thaung and Daw Ngwe Yin. In a family with seven siblings, he was the fifth after three sisters and one brother. His father, uncle and three of his brothers were or became boxers as well. As a child he followed his brother around to local pagoda festivals and monks funerals to join the kids matches. He grew up on the west side of the Thanlyin river in Hpa-an but due to the Karen conflict his family was forced to relocate across the Mon State border where they settled near Bin Hlaing along the state border, not far from Thaton. His father who had stayed behind was later killed. Thaton was a hotbed and great stomping ground for many traditional boxers in the area and Moe Kyoe's love for the sport only grew stronger.

== Lethwei career ==
The journey to first class started in Mon State, in particular Thaton, Kyaikto and Sit Taung. For a short period of time he also fought Thais in Myawaddy in the mid-60's. It was actually in Kyaikto where he received his nickname of Moe Kyoe (meaning thunderbolt/lightning), when a travelling circus shared the festival grounds with the boxing ring and an attending member of the circus noted his swiftness in the ring. Ringside judge and announcer U Sein Tin Maung overheard this and promptly presented the boxer with his new name. By 1969 Moe Kyoe was ranked as a second class boxer and hailed as a promising new star.

In the 70's he became a leading and pivotal figure in the sport, winning first class flags against some of the strongest opposition available. His battles with one of the most famous boxers in the person of Tha Mann Kyar are remembered by many. Although no titles were exchanged, his losses to Tha Mann Kyar were used to premiere a national champion over that of a traditional flag champion. Moe Kyoe continued his career for a few more years, into the 80's, until he took a brief hiatus both due to a shortage of competition and the rising economic crisis in the country. After a few years of illegal work importing bicycle tires, car tires and cloth he came back and had one of his last fights against Shwe War Tun, a future long-time national champion and son of the equally imposing Phyu Gyi.

A high fighting spirit was the most important. It was a desire. A desire to win, that's all.

— Moe Kyoe (MLC, Nov. 2020)

== Format changes ==
After organisers and promoters started noticing imbalanced competitions in regards to how intensely competitors fought if they were in the same tournament as Moe Kyoe, the trio of him, Kyar Ba Nyein (Myanmar Boxing Federation) and U Bo Sein (Burmese boxer) polished up some of the rules and created a new type of challenge fight. This meant initially that matches would not surpass 15 rounds and that in case of a title challenge judges would score the contest at ringside. These changes gradually led to the naming of a single champion, national or global. And although Moe Kyoe certainly had an equal status to those who succeeded him, he did not carry the title on paper.

== Personal life ==
Moe Kyoe married once at age 20 but continued his boxing career. He currently lives a solitary life as a monk in the forest near Myaing Ka Lay where he resides alongside the small stupa that carries his name. In his journey to escape from Samsara, after his life as a boxer, he became a vegetarian to comfort his aching body.

== Titles and accomplishments ==
- Tournaments
  - First class flag champion; Mon Shwe Hinthar, 33rd Mon National Day (February 1980)
  - Second class flag champion; 16th Kawhtoolei State Day (November 1971)
  - Second class flag champion; Man Thida Park, Mandalay (February 1970)
  - Special flag champion (Second class); Independence Day (January 1970)
  - Perseverance award (Third class); Shwe Maw Daw Pagoda Festival (April 1968)

== Lethwei record ==
Professional Lethwei record
Date	Result	Opponent	Event	Location	Method	Round	Time
1980-07-05	Loss	(Myanmar) Thaton Ba Hnit	Malun Stadium	Mandalay, Myanmar	TKO	4	
1980-02-05	Win	(Myanmar) Yangon Aung Din	33rd Mon National Day, Thein Phyu Stadium	Rangoon, Burma	KO	13	
1979-03-19	Loss	(Myanmar) Tha Mann Kyar	32nd Mon National Day	Mon State, Myanmar	Decision	15	3:00
1978-11-06	Loss	(Myanmar) Tha Mann Kyar	23rd Kayin State Day	Kayin State, Myanmar	TKO		
Lost Openweight Lethwei Golden Belt
1977-02-03	Draw	(Myanmar) Tha Mann Kyar	30th Mon National Day	Mawlamyine, Mon State, Myanmar	Draw	11	3:00
Match halted by Kyar Ba Nyein after both competitors were deemed too bloody
1973-01-09	Win	(Myanmar) Sakkaw Ma	Kyaikkasan Stadium	Rangoon, Burma	KO	1	
1972-01-11	Loss	(Myanmar) Kyaung Thar	Final, Independence Day	Rangoon, Burma	TKO (hand injury)	1	
1971-11-10	Win	(Myanmar) Phyu Kalay (Singu)	Final, Flag Tournament 16th Kawhtoolei State Day	Hpa-an, Burma	TKO		
1971-11-08	Win	(Myanmar) Waing Taw Lar (Win Ka Mawt)	Semi-final, Flag Tournament 16th Kawhtoolei State Day	Hpa-an, Burma	TKO	4	
1970-02-14	Win	(Myanmar) Tun Tin (Hpa-an)	Finals, Flag Tournament Man Thida Park	Mandalay, Burma	KO	4	
1970-01-11	Win	(Myanmar) Shwegun Daung (Mottama)	Independence Day, Kennedy Island	Rangoon, Burma	KO	3	
Legend: Win Loss Draw/No contest Notes

Awards and achievements
Unknown	Golden Belt – Openweight Lethwei World Champion; N/A - November 6, 1978	Succeeded by That Mann Kyar
