= Rubie =

Rubie is a surname. Notable people with the surname include:

- Anneliese Rubie (born 1992), Australian sprinter
- Brennan Rubie (born 1991), American alpine ski racer
- Claude Rubie (1888–1939), English cricketer and soldier
- Howard Rubie (1938–2011), Australian director
- Les Rubie (1916–1994), Canadian actor
- Noel Rubie (1901–1975), Australian painter and photographer
