= Nyan Win (politician, born 1942) =

Burmese politician (1942–2021)

- ဉာဏ်ဝင်း

Member-elect of Pyithu Hluttaw (1990)
- Constituency: Paung Township № 1
- Majority: 20,032 (55.2%)

Personal details
- Born: 20 November 1942 Kyaikkami, Mon State, Burma, British Raj
- Died: 20 July 2021 (aged 78) Yangon, Myanmar
- Party: National League for Democracy
- Spouse: Hla Hla Win
- Parent(s): U Chin Phay (father); Daw Yi (mother)
- Education: LLB, 1968
- Alma mater: Rangoon Arts and Sciences University
- Occupation: High court lawyer (retired)

Nyan Win (Burmese: ဉာဏ်ဝင်း; 20 November 1942 – 20 July 2021) was a Burmese politician and Aung San Suu Kyi's personal attorney. Nyan Win served on the National League for Democracy's Central Executive Committee and was a party spokesman. He also served as a legal advisor to the NLD.

== Career ==
Nyan Win was born in Kyaikkami, Mon State on 20 November 1942 to parents Chin Pe and Daw Yi. After graduating with an LLB from Rangoon University, he served as a High Court advocate from 1970 to 1973, and worked as a government prosecutor until his retirement in November 1988.

Nyan Win won the seat in the Pyithu Hluttaw to represent the Paung Township Constituency No. 1 in the 1990 Burmese general election, winning about 55% of the votes (20,032 valid votes).

== Arrest and death ==
In the wake of the 2021 Myanmar coup d'état on 1 February, Nyan Win was detained by the Myanmar Armed Forces. He was accused of "inciting public disorder" and kept in the Insein Prison, where he contracted COVID-19. Nyan Win was transferred to Yangon General Hospital in mid-July after his condition worsened, but died within a week on 20 July 2021, at the age of 78.
