= Basil Eddis =

Sir Basil Eddis
Personal information
- Full name: Basil Eden Garth Eddis
- Born: 17 September 1881; Calcutta, Bengal Presidency
- Died: 5 November 1971 (aged 90); Aldeburgh, Suffolk, England
- Batting: Right-handed
- Role: Batsman
- Relatives: Bruce Eddis (brother)

International information
- National side: Burma (1912)

Domestic team information
- Years: Team
- 1908: Marylebone Cricket Club

Career statistics
Competition	FC
Matches	1
Runs scored	62
Batting average	31.00
100s/50s	0/0
Top score	40
Catches/stumpings	0/–
- Source: CricketArchive, 23 July 2015

Sir Basil Eden Garth Eddis (17 September 1881 – 5 November 1971) was an Anglo-Indian businessman from Calcutta who served as president of the Bengal Chamber of Commerce and Industry from 1927 to 1928. He was also a keen sportsman, playing a single match of first-class cricket for the Marylebone Cricket Club (MCC) in 1908, and later representing the Burmese national side in one of its earliest matches.

Eddis was born in Calcutta (now Kolkata), as was his younger brother, Bruce Lindsay Eddis, who also played first-class cricket. He was sent to England for school, however, attending Charterhouse School and captaining the school's cricket XI in 1900. During the 1908 English season, Eddis was selected to play for the MCC against Cambridge University, a match that had first-class status. His teammates included past Test players Pelham Warner and J. T. Hearne and future Test player Patsy Hendren, and he topscored with 40 in the MCC's first innings, followed by 22 in the second. The match was notable for Frank Tarrant's hat-trick, and also for every MCC batsman passing double figures in the second innings.

By 1912, Eddis was living in Rangoon. Burma was then under British rule, but had not yet been separated from the Raj. While a resident, he played twice for Burmese teams against a touring side from British Ceylon (now Sri Lanka) – one match for the Rangoon Gymkhana and one for an All-Burma team, a predecessor of the current Myanmar national side. For the gymkhana team, Eddis opened the batting in both innings, topscoring with 32 in the first innings but recording a duck in the second. For All-Burma, making only its second recorded appearance (and first since 1894), he again opened the batting, but his 20 runs was overshadowed by the next batsman in, FitzAlan Drayson, who scored 137 to help Burma to an innings victory.

In September 1926, Eddis was appointed consul-general for the Kingdom of Siam in Calcutta, having established himself as a merchant there. The following year, at which time he was employed as a partner with Gillanders, Arbuthnot, and Co., he was elected president of the Bengal Chamber of Commerce, serving a one-year term. In March 1929, in connection with his holding of that office, Eddis was created a Knight Bachelor. He was personally invested by the Prince of Wales (later Edward VIII) later in the year, while in England. Eddis retired to Suffolk, dying in Aldeburgh in November 1971, aged 90.
