= Harold Garnett =

English cricketer (1879–1917)

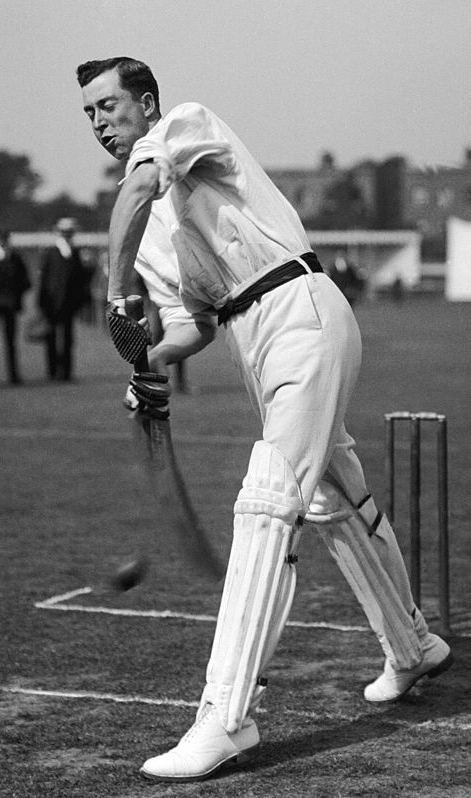

Personal information
- Full name: Harold Gwyer Garnett
- Born: 19 November 1879; Aigburth, Lancashire, England
- Died: 3 December 1917 (aged 38); Marcoing, Nord-Pas-de-Calais, France
- Batting: Left-handed
- Bowling: Slow left-arm orthodox
- Role: Wicket-keeper
- Relatives: Frank Garnett (brother)

Domestic team information
- Years: Team
- 1899–1914: Lancashire

Career statistics
Competition	First-class
Matches	152
Runs scored	5,798
Batting average	26.00
100s/50s	5/32
Top score	139
Balls bowled	334
Wickets	8
Bowling average	28.00
5 wickets in innings	0
10 wickets in match	0
Best bowling	2/18
Catches/stumpings	184/19
- Source: CricketArchive, 23 January 2011

Harold Gwyer Garnett (19 November 1879 – 3 December 1917) was an English-born first-class cricketer who played for Lancashire County Cricket Club and Argentina. He was killed during World War I in the fighting at Cambrai, France. A wicketkeeper, in 152 first-class games he scored 5,798 runs and made 203 dismissals.
