= Bruce Eddis =

English cricketer

Bruce Lindsay Eddis (born 17 August 1883 in Calcutta, Bengal, India; died 12 May 1966 in Maidenhead, Berkshire, England) was an English soldier and first-class cricketer. He played several matches for the Straits Settlements, against the Federated Malay States and Hong Kong, before playing a first-class match for a combined Army/Navy team at Lord's in August 1919. He later played twice for the Marylebone Cricket Club (MCC) against Ireland in August 1926. His brother, Basil Eddis, also played first-class cricket.

Eddis was commissioned into the Royal Engineers as a second lieutenant on 31 January 1903. He served in World War I and was awarded a DSO in the 1918 New Year Honours.
