= Charles McCarthy (cricketer) =

English cricketer

Personal information
- Full name: Charles Henry Florence D'Arcy McCarthy
- Born: 29 June 1899; Coimbatore, Madras Presidency, British Raj
- Died: 24 July 1977 (aged 78); Lyford Cay, New Providence, Bahamas
- Batting: Right-handed
- Bowling: Leg break

International information
- National side: Burma

Domestic team information
- Years: Team
- 1929–1931: Devon
- 1926/27: Rangoon Gymkhana
- 1921: Army

Career statistics
Competition	First-class
Matches	3
Runs scored	75
Batting average	15.00
100s/50s	–/–
Top score	48
Balls bowled	30
Wickets	1
Bowling average	33.00
5 wickets in innings	–
10 wickets in match	–
Best bowling	1/33
Catches/stumpings	–/–
- Source: Cricinfo, 20 March 2011

Charles Henry Florence D'Arcy McCarthy (29 June 1899 – 24 July 1977) was an English cricketer, born in Coimbatore which was then in the British Raj. McCarthy was a right-handed batsman who bowled leg break.

McCarthy attended Rugby School and played for the school cricket team from 1915 to 1917. He attended the Royal Military Academy, Woolwich in 1918 and later joined the Royal Engineers in 1919. McCarthy made his first-class debut for the Army against Cambridge University in 1921. Six years later he played for Rangoon Gymkhana in their only first-class match, which came against the Marylebone Cricket Club. In this match he took a single wicket, that of John Parsons in the MCC first-innings. With the bat he scored 5 runs in the Gymkhana's first-innings, before being dismissed by Jack Mercer, while in their second-innings he scored 11 runs before being dismissed by Maurice Tate. Two days after the conclusion of that match, McCarthy made his final first-class appearance for Burma against the MCC. He scored top scored in their first-innings with 48. In their second-innings he scored 9 runs before being dismissed by Maurice Tate. His first-innings score is the highest score by a batsman for Burma in first-class cricket, although this feat was not difficult to achieve as this was Burma's only match with first-class status.

Returning to England, McCarthy made two Minor Counties Championship appearances for Devon in 1929, later making four appearances for the county in 1931. He later served in the Second World War and was mentioned in The London Gazette on 9 September 1942 as holding the temporary rank of colonel in the Royal Engineers. He was based in Bath, Somerset, at this time.

He died in Lyford Cay, New Providence in the Bahamas on 24 July 1977.
