= Basic Education High School No. 2 Mandalay =

Secondary school in Mandalay, Myanmar

Coordinates: 21°58′36.7″N 96°04′57.8″E

Mandalay 2 High School အ.ထ.က. (၂) မန္တလေး
- Mandalay, Mandalay Region; Myanmar

Information
- Type: Public
- School number: 2
- Grades: K-10

Basic Education High School (BEHS) No. 2 Mandalay (Burmese: အခြေခံ ပညာ အထက်တန်း ကျောင်း အမှတ် (၂) မန္တလေး; formerly, Mandalay National High School) is a public high school in Mandalay, Myanmar. It was formerly called Mandalay National High School.

== Notable alumni and faculty ==
- U Razak, headmaster of Mandalay National High School
- Ludu Daw Amar
- Kyar Ba Nyein
- Vice-Senior General Maung Aye. Vice-Chairman of the State Peace and Development Council (SPDC), the ruling military junta of Burma.
