= Richard Burrows =

Irish businessman

- Born: Richard George William Burrows; 16 January 1946 (age 80)
- Education: Wesley College (Dublin)
- Occupation: Businessman
- Years active: 1967–present
- Title: Former chairman of British American Tobacco
- Term: 2009–2021
- Predecessor: Jan du Plessis
- Board member of: Rentokil Initial, CityJet, Carlsberg Group, Pernod Ricard

Richard George William Burrows (born 16 January 1946) is an Irish businessman. He is the chairman of British American Tobacco plc (informally BAT), the world's largest tobacco company by sales, and former chief executive of Irish Distillers. In October 2016, Burrows became the chairman of Craven House Capital, an AIM-listed company that specializes in restructuring, expansion and turnaround investments in crisis and transitioning economics.

== Early life ==
Burrows is a graduate of Wesley College (Dublin).

== Career ==
Burrows joined accounting firm Stokes Brothers & Pim (which later became part of KPMG) at the age of 17 as a trainee accountant. Burrows was seconded to Irish Distillers to assist in a proposed merger with Waterford Glass, P.J. Carroll & Co. and the Irish Glass Bottle Company. In 1971 he joined Irish Distillers full-time and became its chief executive in 1978. Irish Distillers was acquired by Pernod-Ricard S.A. in 1988 and Burrows later became joint CEO of Pernod-Ricard.

Burrows became Governor (that is, chairman) of the Bank of Ireland in 2006, a post from which he resigned in June 2009.

Burrows joined the board of British American Tobacco plc as a non-executive director in September 2009 and became chairman on 1 November 2009. He stood down as chairman and retired from the board at the company's 28 April 2021 AGM, and was succeeded by Luc Jobin.

== Honours and awards ==
In June 1996, he was made a Chevalier of the French Legion of Honour.
