= George Forrester (cricketer) =

Scottish cricketer

Personal information
- Full name: George Douglas Forrester
- Born: 22 May 1890; Colinton, Midlothian, Scotland
- Died: 6 May 1959 (aged 68); Barwon Heads, Victoria, Australia
- Batting: Right-handed
- Bowling: Unknown

Domestic team information
- Years: Team
- 1912–1913: Oxford University

Career statistics
Competition	First-class
Matches	6
Runs scored	235
Batting average	21.36
100s/50s	–/1
Top score	82
Balls bowled	24
Wickets	0
Bowling average	–
5 wickets in innings	–
10 wickets in match	–
Best bowling	–
Catches/stumpings	4/–
- Source: Cricinfo, 19 May 2020

George Douglas Forrester (22 May 1890 – 6 May 1959) was a Scottish first-class cricketer.

The son of Henry Forrester, he was born in the Edinburgh suburb of Colinton in May 1890. He was educated in England at Rugby School, before going up to University College, Oxford. While studying at Oxford, he played first-class cricket for Oxford University in 1912 and 1913, making a total of six appearances. Forrester scored a total of 235 runs in his six matches, at an average of 21.36 and with a high score of 82.

After graduating from Oxford, he travelled to British Burma to take up employment as an assistant at the Burma Oil Company. During the First World War, he was commissioned in April 1917 as a second lieutenant in the Rangoon Mounted Rifles. He later emigrated to Australia, where he died in May 1959 at Barwon Heads, Victoria.
