= Claude Rubie =

English cricketer and soldier

Claude Rubie

Lieutenant-Colonel Claude Blake Rubie CBE ED (25 March 1888 – 3 November 1939) was an English amateur first-class cricketer and soldier.

Rubie was a right-handed batsman and wicketkeeper. He was a British Army Special Reserve Major (later Lieut-Colonel) who saw long service in India and played for the Europeans in the Bombay Quadrangular between 1919 and 1926. He played a prominent part in the development of cricket in the Karachi area, where he played most of his cricket. He captained three of the local teams that opposed the MCC on its tour of India in 1926–27 before returning to England and representing Sussex in four matches in 1930. In 1928, with B. D. Shanker, he wrote A History of the Sind Cricket Tournament and Karachi Cricket in General.

In recognition of his knowledge of Indian cricket, Rubie was appointed to manage the England national cricket team's tour of India in 1939–40. The team was selected but the outbreak of the Second World War on 1 September 1939 caused its immediate cancellation. On 3 November that year, when the tour would have been under way, Rubie died of a heart attack after an operation.

Rubie was born at Lewes and died at Hove, both in Sussex. He made 10 first-class appearances, scoring 245 runs @ 24.50 with a highest innings of 84, his sole half-century. He held 16 catches and completed 7 stumpings to average more than two victims per match.

== Bibliography ==
- Caple, S. Canynge (1959). England versus India: 1886 – 1959. Worcester: Littlebury & Co. Ltd. ASIN B001EN6QX2. OCLC 771366705.
