= John Aston (cricketer) =

Irish cricketer (1882–1951)

Cricket information
- Batting: Right-handed
- Bowling: Right-arm medium

International information
- National side: Ireland

Career statistics
Competition	First-class
Matches	4
Runs scored	73
Batting average	10.42
100s/50s	0/1
Top score	53*
Balls bowled	366
Wickets	9
Bowling average	11.22
5 wickets in innings	1
10 wickets in match	0
Best bowling	5/58
Catches/stumpings	1/0
- Source: CricketArchive, 27 May 2021

John Aston (20 November 1882 – 9 January 1951) was an Irish cricketer. He was a right-handed batsman and right-arm medium pace bowler.

He made his debut for the Gentlemen of Ireland on their tour of North America in 1909, playing against a team representing New York City. He then played two first-class matches against Philadelphia on the same tour. He later played two first-class matches for Ireland in 1925, one against Scotland and the other against Wales in addition to a match against the MCC at Lord's. His brother, Herbert Aston, was also a first-class cricketer and played international rugby union.
