= Marylebone Cricket Club tour of India and Ceylon in 1926–27 =

International cricket tour

An international cricket team raised by the Marylebone Cricket Club (MCC) toured India and Ceylon from October 1926 to March 1927 and played several first-class matches against regional and national sides in both countries. Of the many MCC teams to visit Ceylon (now Sri Lanka), this was the first to play first-class matches there. Captained by Arthur Gilligan, the team played 26 first-class matches in India and a further four first-class matches in Ceylon. Team members included Maurice Tate, Maurice Leyland, Andy Sandham, Bob Wyatt, Arthur Dolphin, George Geary, Ewart Astill and George Brown.

== Matches in India ==
=== Two-Day Match : Parsees and Muslims vs MCC ===
19–20 October 1926
Scorecard

MCC	v	Parsees and Muslims
339 (88 overs); Bob Wyatt 63; Ghulam Mohammad 5/114 (36 overs)		187 (56.2 overs); MJ Mobed 54; Stuart Boyes 2/22 (7 overs)

Match Drawn.
Karachi, British India
Umpires: Unknown

- Toss Unknown

=== Two-Day Match :Hindu and The Rest vs MCC ===
23–24 October 1926
Scorecard

Hindu and The Rest	v	MCC
335 (104 overs); D Jagannath 73; Maurice Tate 5/61 (29 overs)		249/5 (78 overs); Andy Sandham 129; Dasrath Bhogawde 2/56 (20 overs)

Match Drawn.
Karachi, British India
Umpires: Unknown

- Toss Unknown

=== Two-Day Match :Europeans vs MCC ===
26–27 October 1926
Scorecard

MCC	v	Europeans
377 (88.3 overs); Andy Sandham 67; Morgan 3/65 (13 overs)		151 (65.1 overs); Claude Rubie 46*; Maurice Tate 4/19 (10.1 overs)
139/3 (22 overs); Guy Earle 49; Noel Carbutt 2/44 (6 overs)

Match Drawn.
Karachi, British India
Umpires: Unknown

- Toss Unknown

=== Three-Day Match :All Karachi XI vs MCC ===
29–31 October 1926
Scorecard

All Karachi XI	v	MCC
129 (54 overs); Naoomal Jeoomal 32; MJ Mobed 32; Maurice Tate 4/32 (20 overs)		517 (135 overs); JH Parsons 139; Noel Carbutt 5/135 (28 overs)
240 (103.3 overs); Naoomal Jeoomal 81; Maurice Tate 5/35 (27.3 overs)

MCC won by an innings and 148 runs
Karachi, British India
Umpires: Unknown

- Toss Unknown

=== Two-Day Match :Europeans vs MCC ===
3–4 November 1926
Scorecard

MCC	v	Europeans
431/8d (85.4 overs); Andy Sandham 150; Barlow 5/93 (25.4 overs)		145 (55 overs); FJ Matthews 57*; George Geary 3/25 (11 overs)
185/5d (33 overs); Arthur Gilligan 68; Skipp 2/37 (5 overs)		85/1 (23 overs); Ronald Yeldham 40*; Maurice Tate 1/12 (4 overs)

Match Drawn.
Rawalpindi, British India
Umpires: Unknown

- Toss Unknown
