= Kyar Ba Nyein =

Burmese boxer

Ba Nyein
Personal information
- Nickname: Kyar (Tiger)
- Nationality: Burmese
- Born: 23 November 1923 Mandalay, Burma, British India
- Died: 8 July 1979 (aged 55) Rangoon, Burma
- Height: 5 ft 4 in (163 cm)
- Weight: 54 kg (119 lb; 8 st 7 lb)

Boxing career

Boxing record
- Total fights: ~50

Kyar Ba Nyein (Burmese: ကျား ဘငြိမ်း [tɕá ba̰ ɲéɪɰ̃]; 23 November 1923 – 8 July 1979) was the Burmese Lethwei fighter and boxer who participated in boxing at the 1952 Summer Olympics and was a pioneer in modernizing Lethwei. Ba Nyein started boxing at the age of 13 and fought in about 50 matches over 20 years until retiring from fighting at the age of 33.

== Education ==
Born in 1923, Ba Nyein's official height was listed at 5 ft. 4 inches, weighing in at 120 lbs. He and his wife, Kyi Kyi, had 10 children by the time Ba Nyein was 40. Ba Nyein (Mohammad Mustafa) studied at Wesleyan School (BEHS 16 Mandalay) and later transferred to SPG (the Society for the Propagation of the Gospel) in Foreign Parts' Royal diocesan high school (No. 10 BEHS Mandalay) for a few years.

Lastly, he studied at the Mandalay National High School (present day BEHS 2 Mandalay), where he started learning boxing. He was trained by Sinhalese Anglo-Burman Bill Fisher. In 1947, he trained with the famous boxer Than Yin, a Mandalay Police Officer, who received the best boxer award given by world heavyweight champion Gene Tunney in Sri Lanka. Ba Nyein learned his famous "infighting" from Than Yin. In 1936, he became National School Cup Champion at 13. During the Second World War, he left school.

== After the Second World War ==
After the war, Nyein painted for a living with the Allied soldiers. He was the champion of the Kyar-Hto game, which is a Burmese variant of the board game Draughts. He got his nickname "Kyar" (Tiger) from the famous Burmese Draughts player in Mandalay, Ba Than Gyi (known as "Kyar" Ba Than Gyi) who taught him the tactics and strategy of the game. He soon adopted the nickname "Kyar Kalay" (Little Tiger). In the 1947 boxing tournament, he won the Bantamweight class and became Champion, and newspapers started to call him Kyar Kalay Ba Nyein. This was later changed to Kyar Ba Nyein. When he established the Golden tiger boxing club, his ring name was firmly established as Kyar Ba Nyein.

== Achievements ==
Ba Nyein was awarded "The best boxer who used scientific techniques" award in 1949. (He competed with Min Kywe, Samuel from St. Paul, Ki White and Saw Hadi). His best known match occurred in 1951 with the Indian featherweight Champion B. Bose. The Indian team won six matches against Burmese contenders, but Kyar Ba Nyein bested the Indian in that match. B. Bose, who Kyar Ba Nyein defeated, was India's best featherweight champion and was selected to represent India twice in the previous Olympics. Because of this, Kyar Ba Nyein was selected to compete on behalf of Burma in the 15th Olympics held in Helsinki, Finland, in 1952. Ba Nyein was sent to Bangkok for International Boxing Association's Referee examination.

On June 20, 1992, the International Olympic Committee awarded badges of honor to selected athletes who partook in the Olympic Games. Ba Nyein was one of the recipients in the Boxing category.

== Sports reporter, painter, author and journalist ==
Ba Nyein started as a volunteer sports reporter for the Ludu newspaper and the Ludu Journal, following his younger brother Ba Thein, who was already a reporter at that newspaper.

His numerous articles, stories on World Boxing matches, news reports, and sports news commentaries were later published regularly in magazines and journals such as Myawaddy, Thwe Thauk (Comrade), Mogyo (Thunder) and Tagun (Banner). His first book published was Blood on the sand.

== Voluntary works and training young boxers ==
He was the first Burmese to train youths on the street. He established Golden Tiger Boxing clubs in Dah dan 25th street and another near the Burma Muslim Congress on 83rd street. He trained hundreds of young boxers, and was appointed a boxing trainer in 1954 by the National Fitness Council. Ye Chit, Ye Swe, Ye Myint and Ye Tint were the boxers he trained from Mandalay. Tint Tun, Alexandria and Hla Shwe (Navy) from Rangoon were also his trainees. Kyar Ba Nyein was so proud about the success of his boxers that he once told Ludu Daw Ah Mar that he never got serious injuries or scars during his 50 boxing matches, including seven with foreigners. However, he got multiple scars, while training his boxers, because he allowed his trainees to hit him during training sessions, to teach in a practical way: how to fight back without retreating to avoid the opponent's assault.

== Lethwei or Burmese traditional boxing ==
Kyar Ba Nyein was a pioneer who drew up the modern scientific rules and regulations that have been used since 1953 for Burmese traditional boxing, or Lethwei. He went around all of Burma, especially up to the Mon and Karen states, near Thailand, where there are a lot of villagers actively training in Lethwei. He brought some fighters back to Mandalay and Rangoon. He then trained them with the new methods and encouraged them to fight in the Burmese traditional boxing matches, which he had organized around the country and even once, in October 1960, to Beijing and Shanghai, China where he led about 100 boxers to show Lethwei, at the signing ceremony of the Burma-China border treaty. At that time the group leader of the Burmese delegation was Lieutenant Colonel Aung Gyi.

He also organized goodwill matches by leading a group of Burmese traditional boxers to Thailand.

Kyar Ba Nyein died in 1979 suffering from rectal cancer.

== Professional boxing record ==
Result	Opponent	Type	Round, time	Date	Location	Notes
Win	(Pakistan) J.N. Mukherjee	KO	2 (3)	3 Apr 1954	(Myanmar) Bogyoke Aung San Stadium, Rangoon, Burma	
Loss	(Myanmar) Tin Aung	DEC	3 (3)	24 Jan 1953	(Myanmar) Burma Athletic Association Grounds, Rangoon, Burma	Myanmar Muslim Highschool Fundraiser
Loss	(Poland) Leszek Drogosz	UD	3 (3)	28 Jul 1952	Messuhalli, Helsinki, Finland	Summer Olympics preliminaries
Win	(Myanmar) Maung Myint	DEC	3 (3)	10 May 1952	(Myanmar) Burma Athletic Association Grounds, Rangoon, Burma	Featherweight bout
Win	(India) W. King	DEC	3 (3)	22 Mar 1952	(Myanmar) Burma Athletic Association Grounds, Rangoon, Burma	
Win	(India) W. King	KO	2 (3)	9 Nov 1951	(Myanmar) Burma Athletic Association Grounds, Rangoon, Burma	India vs. Burma
Win	(India) Benoy Bose	DEC	3 (3)	7 Nov 1951	(Myanmar) Burma Athletic Association Grounds, Rangoon, Burma	India vs. Burma
Win	(Myanmar) Theo Elvis	KO	2 (3)	20 Feb 1951	(Myanmar) Burma Athletic Association Grounds, Rangoon, Burma	
Win	(Myanmar) Theo Elvis	KO	3 (3)	11 Feb 1950	(Myanmar) Burma Athletic Association Grounds, Rangoon, Burma	
Win	(Myanmar) Aung Than Sein (Saw Bar Bar)	TKO	1 (3)	19 Nov 1949	(Myanmar) Burma Athletic Association Grounds, Rangoon, Burma	Tatmadaw Relief Fundraiser
Win	(Myanmar) L. Marceli		(3)	14 Jan 1949	(Myanmar) Police force compound along Pyay Road, Rangoon, Burma	Featherweight bout

== Exhibition boxing record ==
No.	Result	Opponent	Round	Date	Location	Notes
3	—N/a	(Myanmar) Hantharwaddy Soe Myint	3 (3)	6 Mar 1957	(Myanmar) Bogyoke Aung San Stadium, Rangoon, Burma	
2	—N/a	(Myanmar) Kumar Yine	3 (3)	28 Oct 1956	(Myanmar) Bogyoke Aung San Stadium, Rangoon, Burma	Originally vs. T. Aung for Olympic selections
1	—N/a	(Myanmar) Tun Kyi	3 (3)	12 May 1956	(Myanmar) Shwe Wei Thiri movie theatre, Tavoy, Burma	

== See also ==
- Lethwei or Burmese traditional boxing
- Boxing at the 1952 Summer Olympics
