= Eoin O'Brien =

Irish clinical scientist

- Born: 20 December 1939 (age 86); Dublin, Ireland
- Education: St. Vincent's College, Castleknock; Royal College of Surgeons in Ireland; National University of Ireland
- Occupation: Clinician

Eoin O'Brien (born 20 December 1939) is an Irish clinical scientist. He has published extensively on hypertension as one of the major causes of death and disability in society. Alongside his medical career, O'Brien has contributed to the field of literary criticism and biography. He has written books on writers and artists including Samuel Beckett, Nevill Johnson and Con Leventhal.

== Early life and education ==
=== Family ===
O'Brien was born in the Pembroke Nursing Home in Dublin on 20 December 1939. His parents, Muriel (née Smiddy) and Gerard T. O'Brien were doctors, who had met during their early training in the City of Dublin Skin & Cancer Hospital on Hume Street in Dublin. His mother was the daughter of Professor Timothy Smiddy, who was advisor to Michael Collins during the 1921 Anglo-Irish Treaty negotiations in London; the first ‘Minister Plenipotentiary’ in Washington from 1924-1929 for the newly founded Irish Free State; High Commissioner in London from 1929 to 1930 and later financial advisor to the Government of Eamon De Valera. O'Brien's father was Senior Physician to St. Laurences's Hospital (the Richmond, Whitworth and Hardwicke Hospitals), visiting physician to the City of Dublin Skin & Cancer Hospital, and an authority on tuberculosis, which was endemic in Ireland during the early decades of the twentieth century.

=== Education ===
O'Brien was educated at Miss Meridith's Pembroke School, St. Conleth's School, and at St. Vincent's College, Castleknock. He commenced the study of medicine in RCSI in October 1957 at the age of 17 years, qualifying with the Licentiate of the Royal College of Surgeons & Physicians of Ireland (LRCPSI) in 1963.

== Medical career ==
Between 1963 and 1965 O'Brien interned with Professor Alan Thompson Professor A. McConnell and Mr. P.C. Carey in St. Laurence's Hospital. In 1965, he became a Junior Partner in general practice in the National Health Service in Smethwick, Birmingham, England. O’Brien was appointed Senior Consultant Physician in Cardiology to the Charitable Infirmary, Jervis Street and Visiting Consultant Physician to the Rotunda Hospital, Dublin, in 1976.

In 1987, O'Brien was appointed consultant cardiologist at Beaumont Hospital when the Charitable Infirmary and St. Laurence's Hospitals closed and moved to the new campus at Beaumont. He was then appointed Professor of Cardiovascular Medicine and awarded the fellowship of The Royal College of Physicians of London (FRCP (UK)) in 1982, a Doctorate of Medicine (MD) from the National University of Ireland in 1983, and in 1993 he was made an honorary fellow of the Royal College of Physicians of Edinburgh (FRCP (Edin). In 2001, O’Brien was appointed Professor of Molecular Pharmacology in the Conway Institute of Biomolecular and Biomedical Research, University College Dublin. O’Brien was conferred with a Doctorate of Science (DSc (NUI)) in 2004. He was President of the Irish Heart Foundation from 2006 – 2009, and was founder and Chairman of the Irish Skin Foundation at the Charles Institute, University College Dublin from 2011 to 2017. O'Brien was appointed editor of the Journal of the Royal College of Physicians & Surgeons from 1973 until 1976, and again from 1988 to 1993. He was editor of the Irish Medical Journal January 1986–December 1987. O'Brien recorded the history of a number of the medical institutions with which he was associated, authoring and editing books on The Charitable Infirmary, The Richmond Hospital, the City of Dublin Skin & Cancer Hospital and the Royal Colleges of Surgeons and Physicians in Dublin.

== Literary criticism ==
O'Brien has authored and edited numerous books of literary biography and criticism, with a special interest in Beckett Studies. In 1986, he wrote The Beckett Country: Samuel Beckett’s Ireland as a tribute to his friend, Irish novelist, playwright and poet Samuel Beckett, on the occasion of Beckett's eightieth birthday. Beckett assisted O’Brien in the compilation of this literary and photographic work, and the two became close friends. This book, which was co-published by The Black Cat Press and Faber & Faber, has been credited with restoring the Irish presence to Beckett's writing. Beckett's biographer James Knowlson described book 'as among the most important to appear on Beckett in the past two decades,' stating how it 'reveals the very Irishness of much of Beckett's landscape and restores the Irish 'feel' to some of the characters of his plays.'

In the same year O'Brien co-authored with James Knowlson, The Beckett Country: catalogue of an exhibition for Samuel Beckett's eightieth birthday. This large 40 panel exhibition, which is now on permanent loan to the James Joyce Library in University College Dublin, was opened at Reading University in 1986 with readings by Ronald Pickup and the late Dame Peggy Ashcroft. O’Brien has written many essays on the writings of Samuel Beckett, his most recent book The Weight of Compassion contains essays on his relationship with the writer. In 2011, he participated in a production by Brian O’Doherty in the National Gallery of Ireland, Hello Sam, an installation and performance piece in dialogue with Beckett and his work. At Beckett's request, O’Brien edited with Edith Fournier and published posthumously Beckett's first novel Dream of Fair to Middling Women in 1992.

O'Brien has also authored and edited various books relating to other literary and artistic figures. In 1984, he edited A.J. Leventhal 1896-1979. Dublin scholar, wit and man of letters for the Leventhal Scholarship which he founded and which has subsequently been awarded to over 30 post-graduate students form Trinity College seeking to pursue studies abroad. O’Brien's friendship with, and admiration for, the English artist Nevill Johnson––for whom he acts as literary executor––influenced him to co-author (with Dickon Hall) a monograph on Johnson's painting and to also write on his contributions as a writer and photographer.
