= Noel Carbutt =

English cricketer

Personal information
- Full name: Noel John Obelin Carbutt
- Born: 25 December 1895; Gingindlovu, Zululand
- Died: 31 October 1964 (aged 68); Durban, Natal, South Africa
- Batting: Right-handed
- Bowling: Legbreak googly

Domestic team information
- Years: Team
- 1923: Essex
- 1926/27: Europeans (India)
- 1926/27: Indian Army
- 1926/27: Northern India

Career statistics
Competition	First-class
Matches	15
Runs scored	135
Batting average	9.64
100s/50s	0/0
Top score	45
Balls bowled	1,386
Wickets	36
Bowling average	38.50
5 wickets in innings	2
10 wickets in match	0
Best bowling	5/20
Catches/stumpings	7/–
- Source: CricketArchive, 13 June 2012

Noel John Obelin Carbutt (25 December 1895 – 31 October 1964) was a first-class cricketer who played for Essex County Cricket Club and teams in India representing the Europeans. Carbutt was a leg-break bowler, making a total of 36 wickets in his 15 first-class matches at an average of 38.50.

Carbutt died in Durban, Natal, South Africa on 31 October 1964 at the age of 68.
