= Kyaikkhami =

Kyaikkhami ကျိုက္ခမီမြို့
- Town
- ဍုၚ်ကျာ်ခမဳ
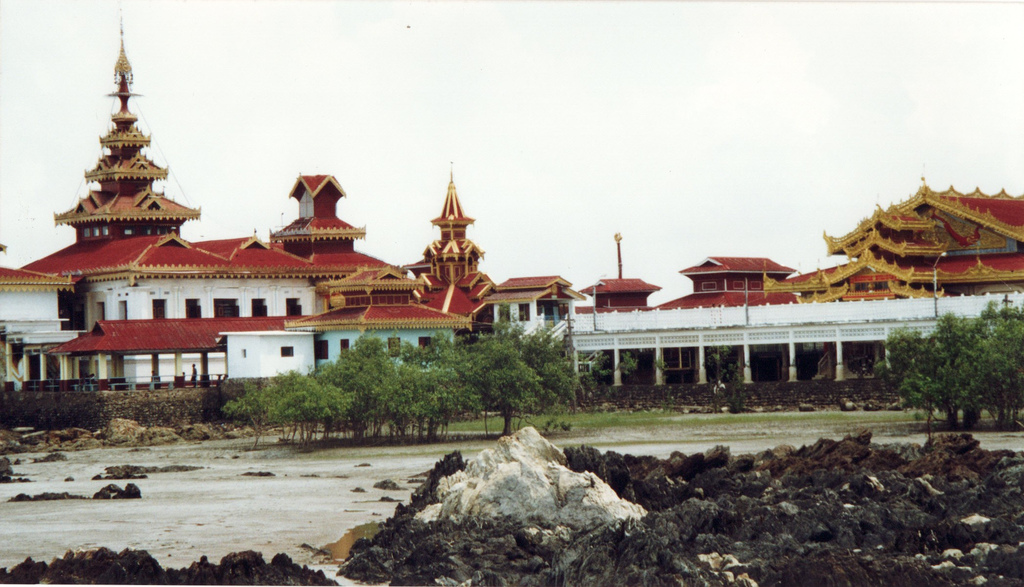

- Location in Burma
- Coordinates: 16°04′48″N 97°34′03″E
- Country: Myanmar
- Division: Mon State

Population (2005)
  - Religions: Buddhism
- Time zone: UTC+6.30 (MST)

Kyaikkhami ( Mon: ကျာ်ခမဳ; Burmese: ကျိုက္ခမီမြို့, MLCTS: kyuikhka.mi mrui.; pronounced [tɕaiʔkʰəmì mjo̰]; Thai: เชียงกราน, formerly Amherst) is a resort town within Thanbyuzayat township in the Mon State of south-east Myanmar.

The town is situated on a peninsula about 48 km (30 mi) south of Mawlamyine, the capital of Mon State. It is a popular destination for local pilgrims and some tourists. The town has a pagoda (Kyaikkami Yele Pagoda or Kyaik-kami Ye Le Paya) just constructed on the sea using the natural foundation of its ocean reefs, which is connected with the corridor to the beach and always attracts the people for the festival of donations over the sea tides during.

== History ==
It was originally a settlement of the Mon people. During the time of the Ayutthaya Kingdom (an ancient kingdom in Thailand), the town was probably a vassal state of Ayutthaya and it was known in Thai as Chiang Kran (เชียงกราน) or Chiang Tran (เชียงตราน). Kyaikkhami was under the possession of Burmese kings before the First Anglo-Burmese war.

Modern Kyaikkhami was founded by the British during the annexation of Tenasserim and Arakan states after the First Anglo-Burmese War. The town was a fishing village of the Mon but it used to be a certain headquarters for British commanding officers for their southern-Burma control. It was renamed Amherst after William Amherst, 1st Earl Amherst, then governor-general of India who successfully seized the town during the First Anglo-Burmese War (1824–1826).

Kyaikkhami (Amherst) briefly became the capital of Amherst district and the seat of British government that governs Tenasserim coast for a short period. Later, the British moved its seat of government to Moulmein (now Mawlamyine). Because of this, many British officers and their Burmese wives and families lived in the area, with a large presence of Anglo-Burmese people, as time progressed.

In the early 19th century, Ann Hasseltine Judson, one of the first female American foreign missionaries lived in Amherst and died here on 24 October 1826 from smallpox. She was credited for the very first translation of Protestant scriptures into Thai and introducing the Protestantism in Thailand. Not only was her husband the first person to compile a Burmese-English dictionary, Ann Hasseltine Judson was also regarded as the mother of missionary schools in Myanmar that became the root of modern education in Myanmar. Her grave is still visible in the town.

Majority of people living in Kyaikkhami are Buddhist Mon people. A Thai community also still exists in the town. Though the town was once the principal town of Amherst district, now it is a resort town within the Thanbyuzayat township.

It got a record rainfall of 75 millimetres (3.0 in) on 14 January 2012. It was the highest amount of rainfall within 24 hours of January in the last 30 years.

== People from Kyaikkhami ==
- Nyan Win

== See also ==
- Thanbyuzayat
- Three Pagoda Pass

== Gallery ==
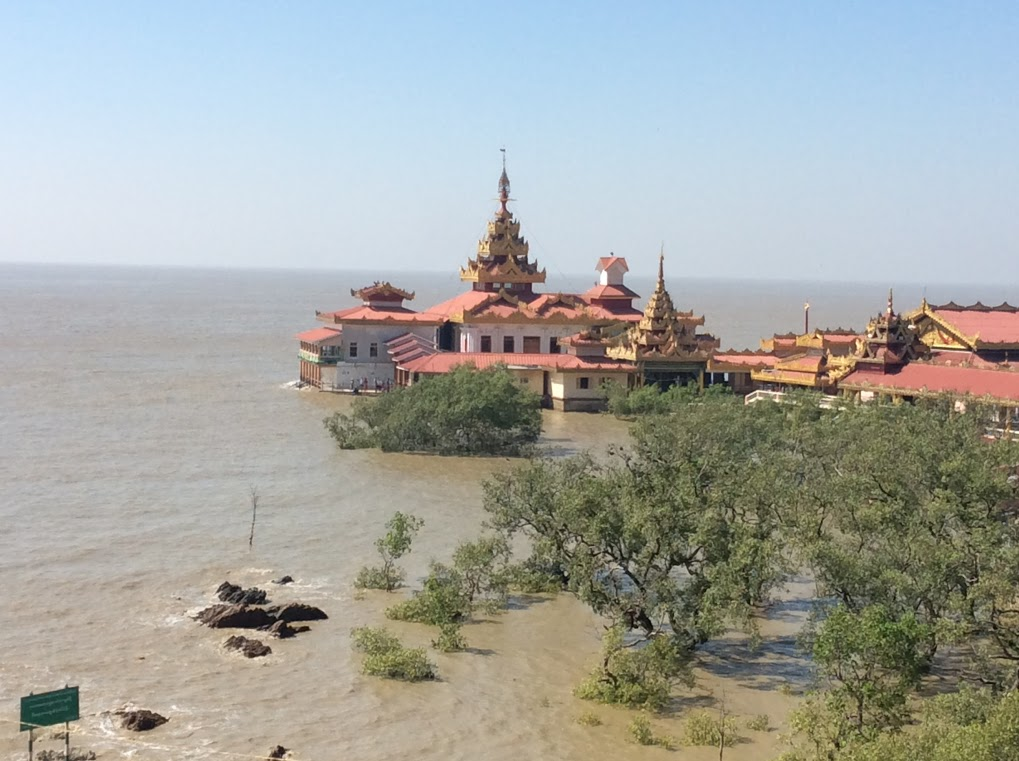
Kyaikkami Yele Pagoda constructed out at sea

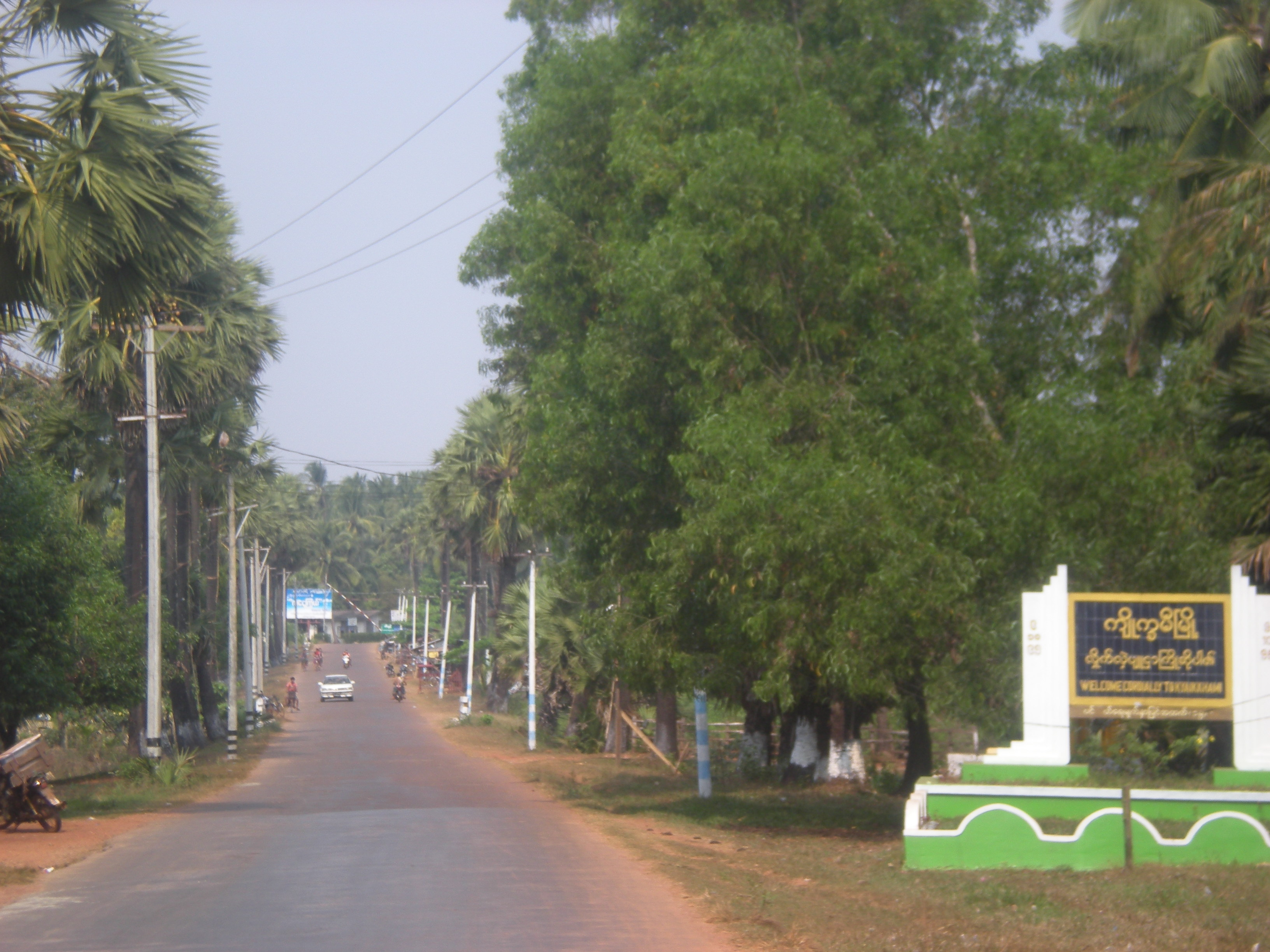
Entrance to Kyaikkami

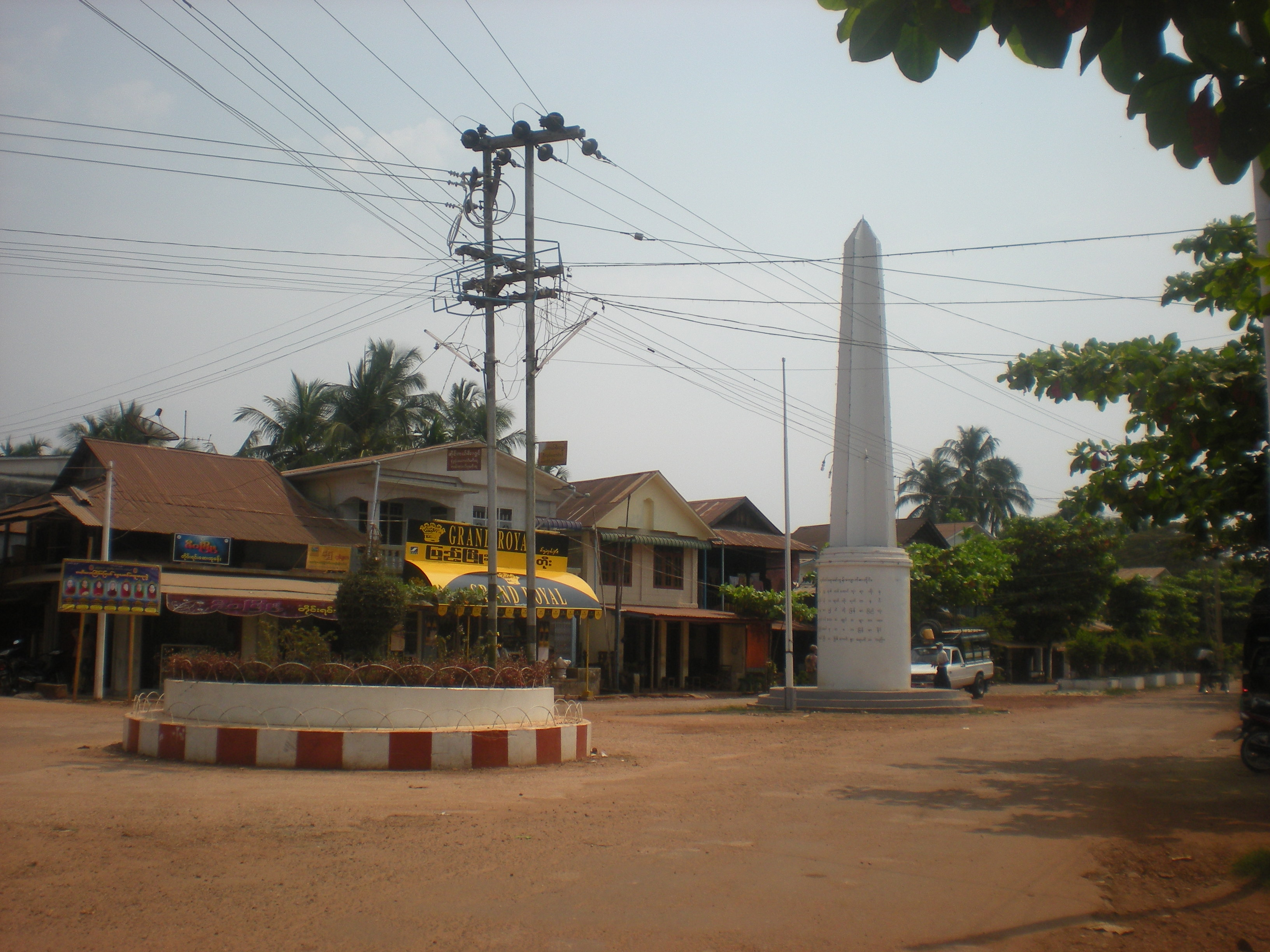
Town center and monument

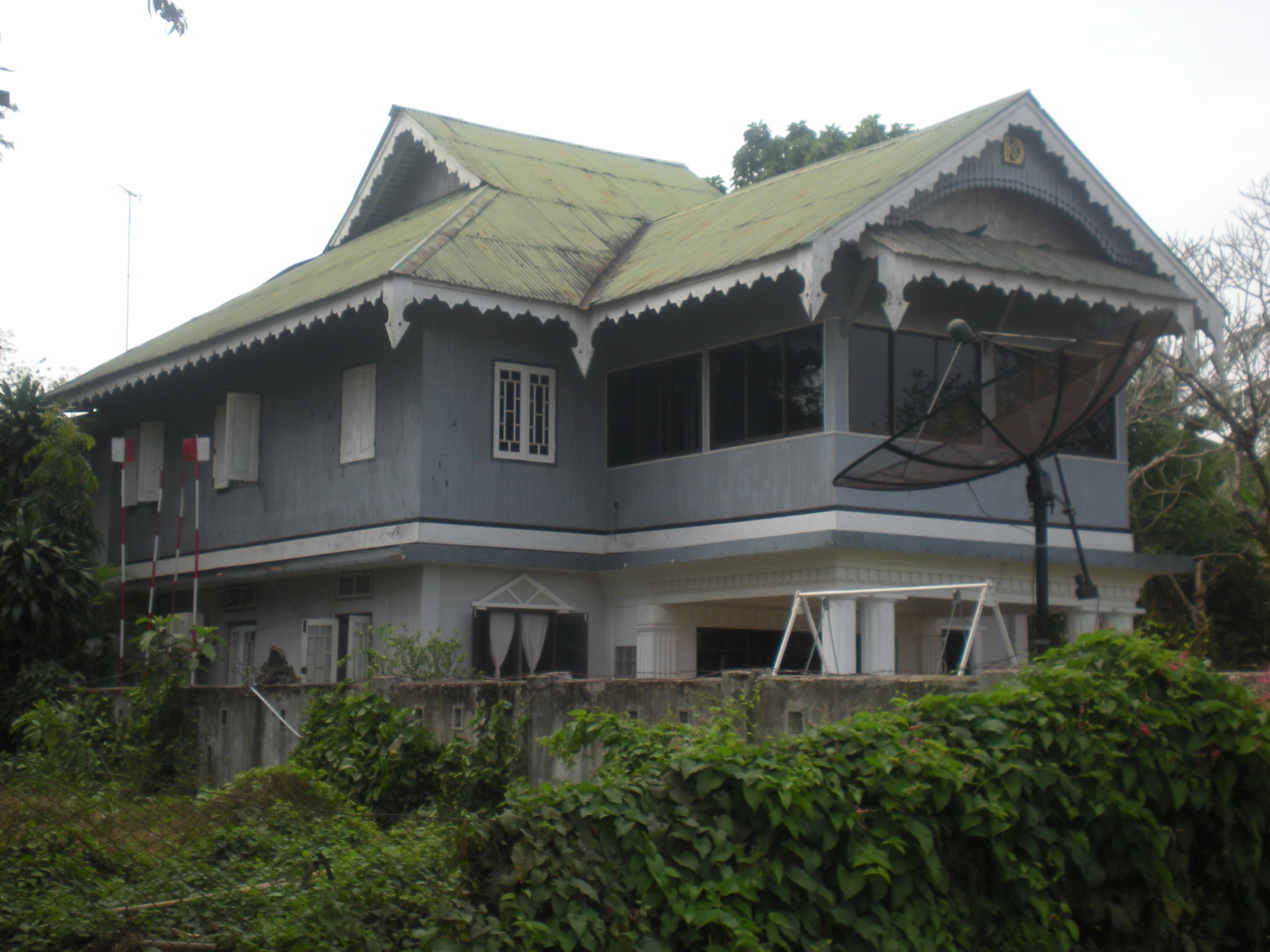
A colonial-era building

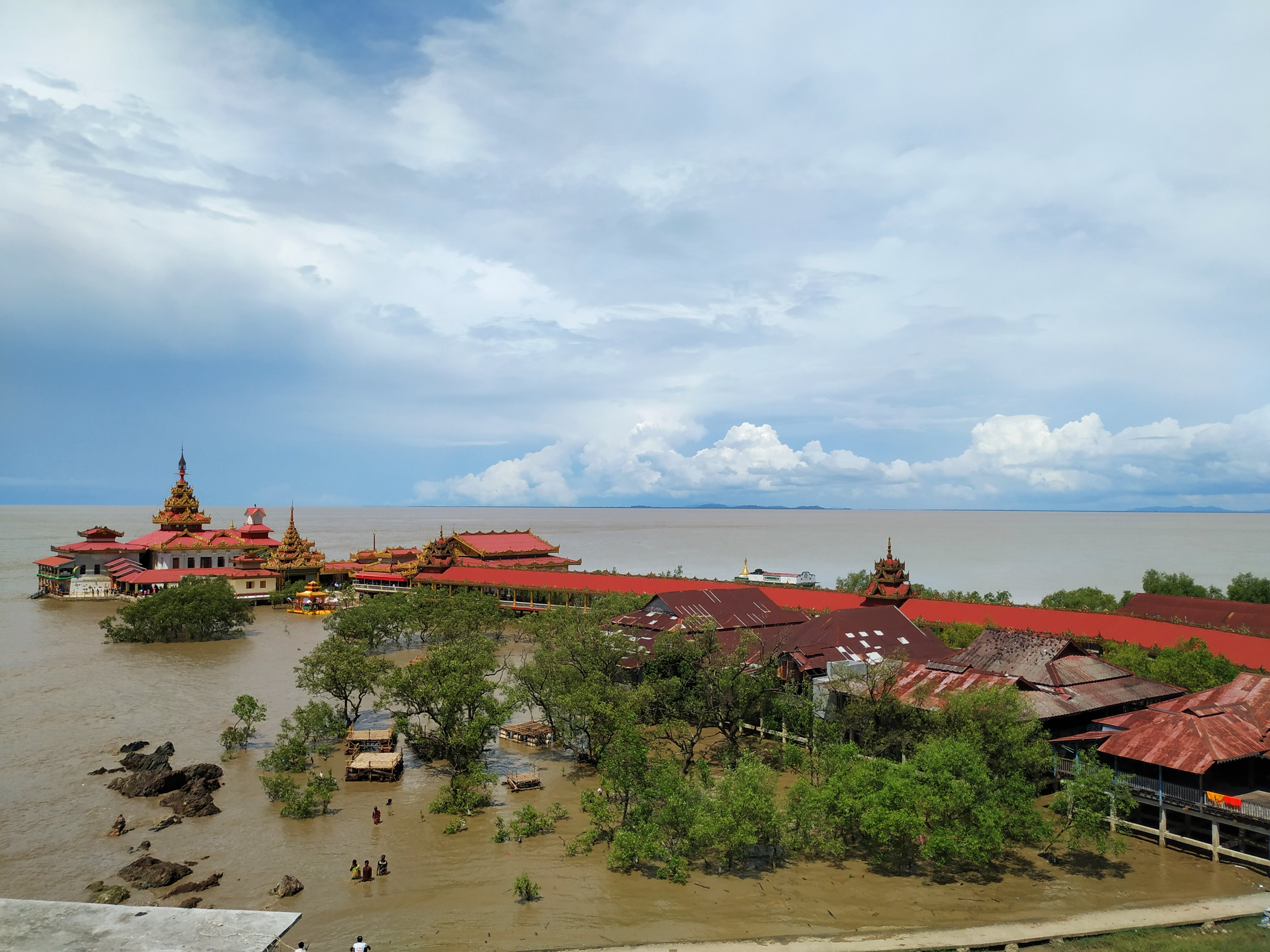
Kayikkhami Yele Pagoda on a sunny day

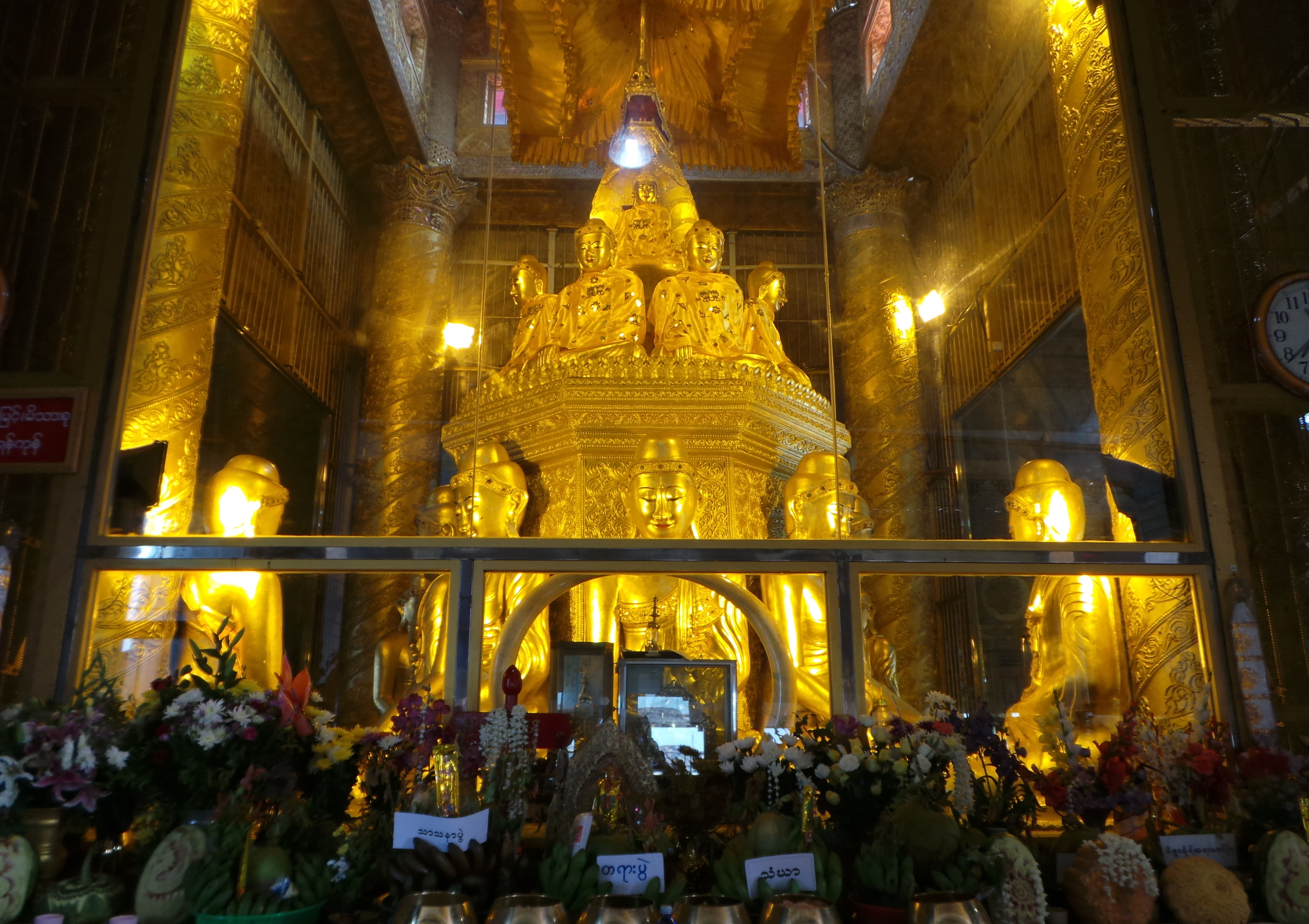
Buddha images inside the Kyaikkhami Yele Pagoda

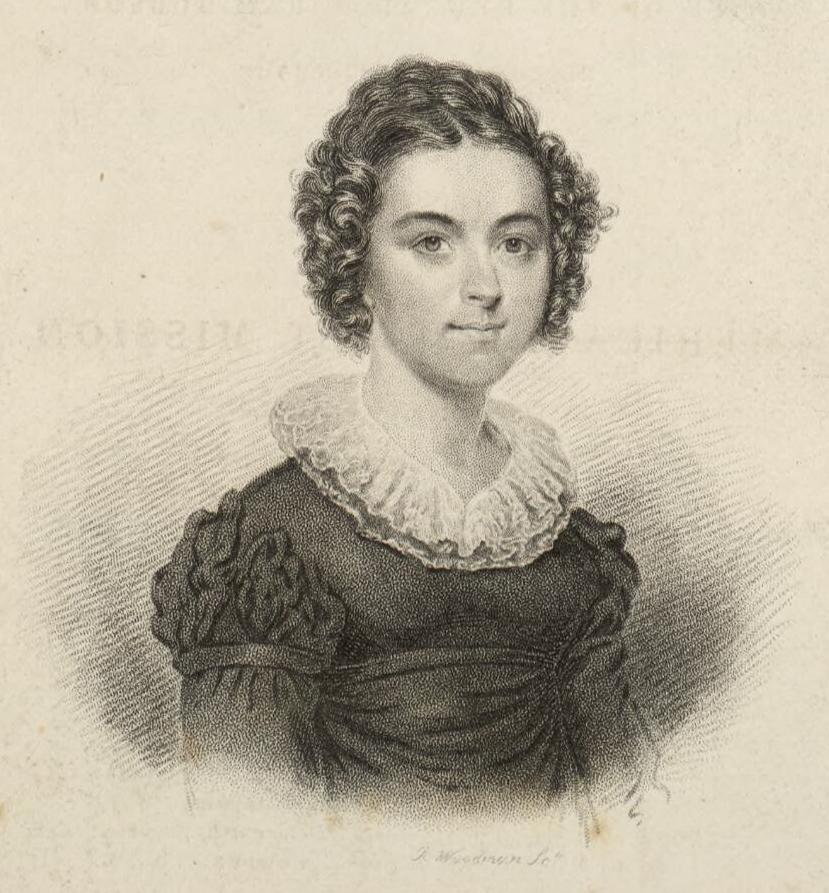
Ann Hasseltine Judson (1789–1826)

The grave of Ann Hasseltine Judson in Kyaikkhami (1913)

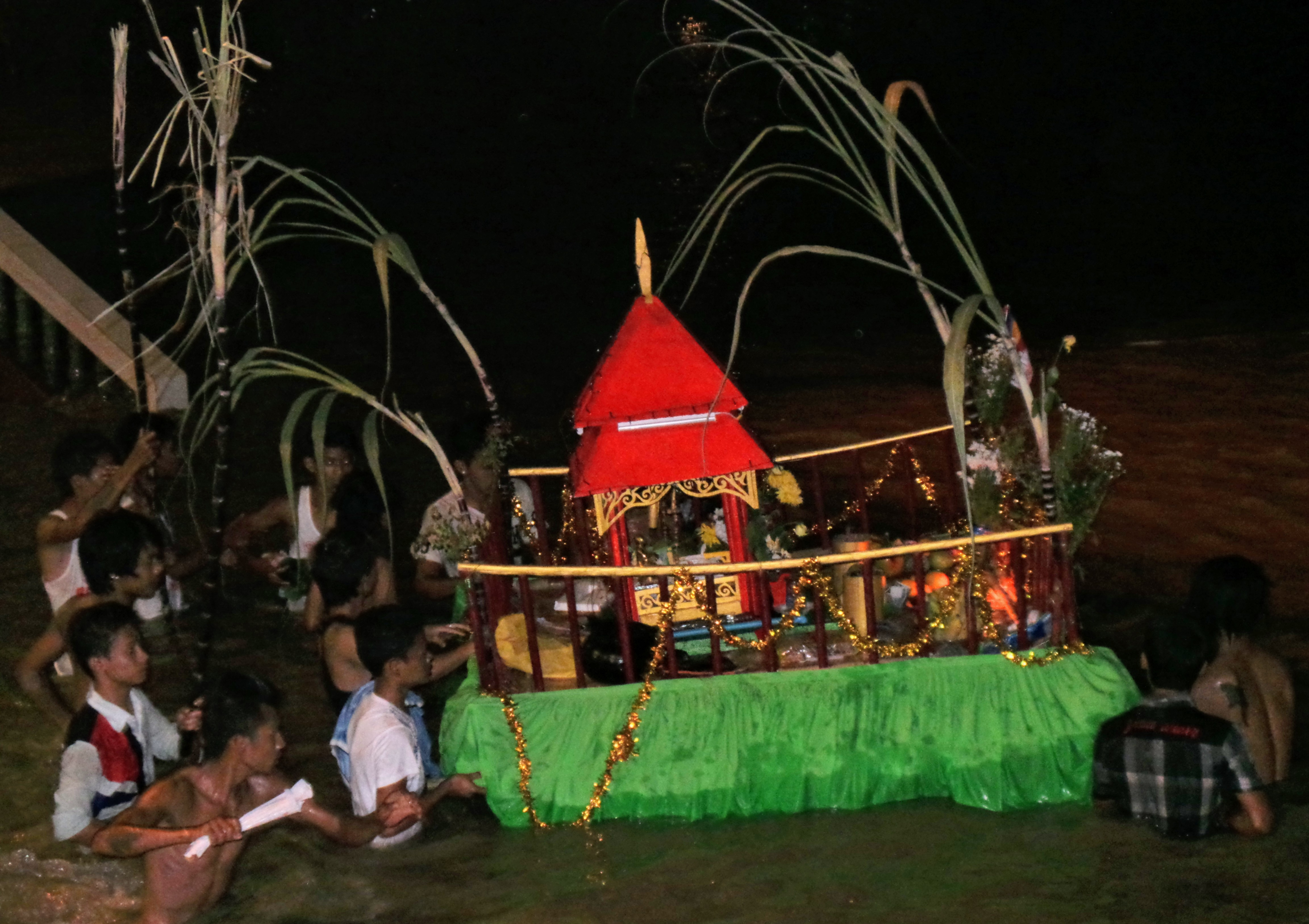
Drifting of Shin Upagutta Raft in Thadingyut festival

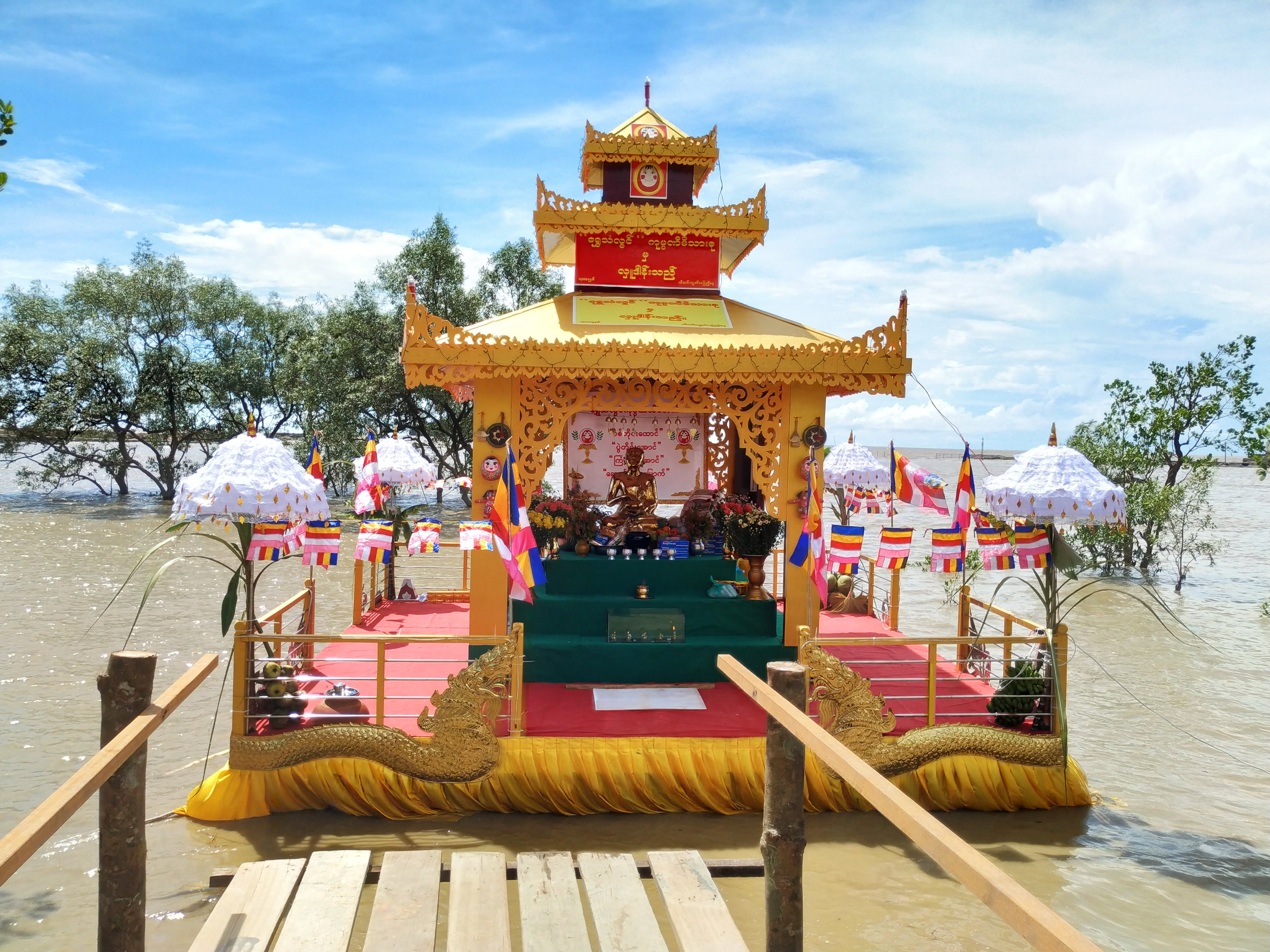
Shin Upagutta drift

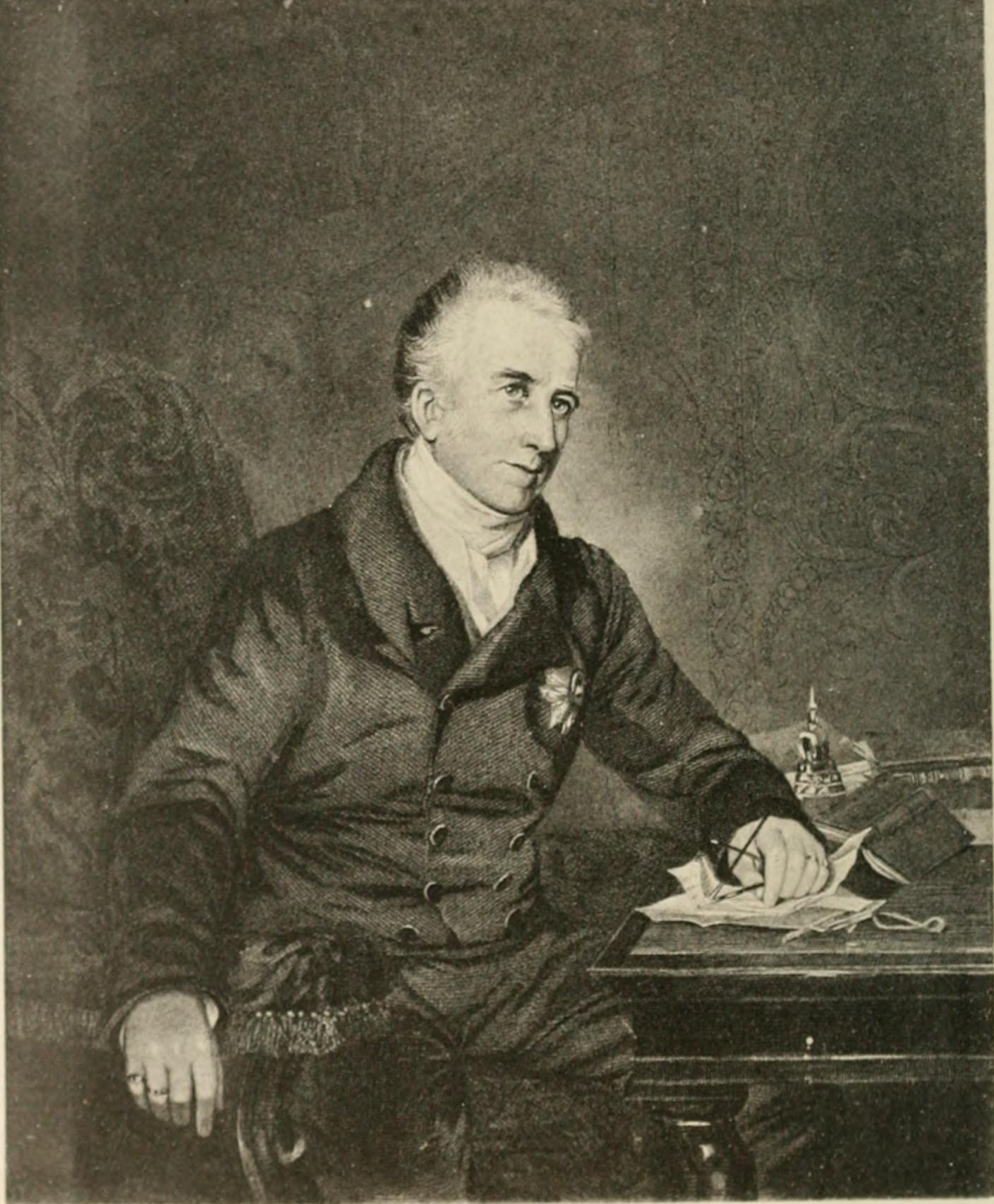
Lord Amherst (1773– 1857)
