= FitzAlan Drayson =

English cricketer and soldier (1888–1964)

Personal information
- Full name: FitzAlan George Drayson
- Born: 10 January 1888; Rochester, Kent, England
- Died: 16 April 1964 (aged 76); Teignmouth, Devon, England
- Batting: Unknown
- Bowling: Unknown

Domestic team information
- Years: Team
- 1918/19: Europeans

Career statistics
Competition	First-class
Matches	2
Runs scored	65
Batting average	16.25
100s/50s	–/–
Top score	28
Balls bowled	6
Wickets	0
Bowling average	–
5 wickets in innings	–
10 wickets in match	–
Best bowling	–
Catches/stumpings	1/–
- Source: ESPNcricinfo, 10 December 2022

FitzAlan George Drayson CBE MC (10 January 1888 — 16 April 1964) was an English first-class cricketer and an officer of the British Army.

The son of Alfred FitzAlan Howard Drayson, he was born at Rochester in January 1888. He was educated at Christ's Hospital, before attending the Royal Military College, Sandhurst. He graduated from there into the Border Regiment as a second lieutenant in October 1906, with promotion to lieutenant following in April 1912. Drayson served in the First World War, during which he seconded for service in the British Indian Army with the Lahore Signal Company and was mentioned in dispatches in February 1915. He was promoted to captain whilst seconded with the Lahore Signal Company in April 1915, and was awarded the Military Cross in the following month, for gallantry and devotion to duty during the Battle of Neuve Chapelle on 11–12 March 1915, during which he kept up communications while under heavy fire. Serving in British India in the later stages of the war, he made two appearances in first-class cricket for the Europeans cricket team against the Hindus and the Parsees in September 1918 at Poona in the Bombay Quadrangular. He scored 65 runs in his two matches, with a highest score of 28. He had served in British Burma prior to the war, playing a minor match for Burma against the Ceylon Europeans in 1912. He scored 137 runs in the Burmese first innings, sharing in a large partnership with Frank Garnett who made 87.

Following the war, Drayson served in the Third Anglo-Afghan War and was mentioned in dispatches for distinguished service. He was made a temporary lieutenant colonel in June 1919, and was mentioned in dispatches for his services with the Royal Corps of Signals during the Waziristan campaign of 1921–24. In May 1924, he was promoted to major, prior to relinquishing his temporary appointment to lieutenant colonel in August 1925. Toward the end of the 1920s, he was an instructor at the School of Signals. In March 1930, he was promoted to lieutenant colonel, while in October of the same year he was appointed a chief signal officer in India, an appointment he vacated the following year. After completing four years as a regimental lieutenant colonel, he was placed on the half-pay list in March 1934. Drayson ceased to be employed in June 1935, at which point he was granted the honorary rank of brigadier. However, in September 1935 he was reappointed to the establishment as a colonel to be chief signal officer of British forces in Egypt, before retiring in August 1939. Drayson returned to service shortly after his retirement when the Second World War began, being appointed chief signal officer for III Corps during the Battle of France. Following the Fall of France, he was appointed chief signal officer for Northern Command. He was made a CBE in the 1940 Birthday Honours, before retiring from active service in November 1944, once again being granted the honorary rank of brigadier. Drayson died at Teignmouth in April 1964.
