= Gymkhana Ground, Rangoon =

Former cricket venue in Myanmar

Coordinates: 16°47′29.61″N 96°08′27.57″E

Gymkhana Ground
- Interactive map of Gymkhana Ground
- Location: Rangoon, Burma
- Country: Burma
- Establishment: 1912 (first recorded match)
- As of 8 October 2011; Source: Ground profile

The Gymkhana Ground was a cricket ground in Rangoon, Burma (today Yangon, Myanmar), where a first-class cricket match took place between the touring Marylebone Cricket Club (MCC) and Rangoon Gymkhana.

The first recorded match held on the ground was in December 1912, when Rangoon Gymkhana played the Europeans. Two further matches were held in that month, with Upper Burma playing the Europeans, and Burma playing the Europeans.

The next recorded match on the ground came in 1927 when Rangoon Gymkhana played its only first-class match against the MCC. It is also the only first-class match played by a Burmese domestic team. The two-day match ended in a draw.

Cricket in Burma (which was at the time administered as part of the British Raj) was a mainly British affair. The Rangoon Gymkhana was frequented exclusively by British officials, which was reflected by the make up of the Gymkhana team against the Marylebone Cricket Club. With Burmese independence in 1948, cricket became largely extinct in the country. The ground along with the Gymkhana Club itself was located along the Halpin Road, today renamed Pyidaungzu Yeiktha Street, and was adjacent to the Prome Road, today renamed Pyay Road.
