= BAA Ground =

Defunct cricket venue in Rangoon, Burma

Coordinates: 16°47′02″N 96°09′39″E

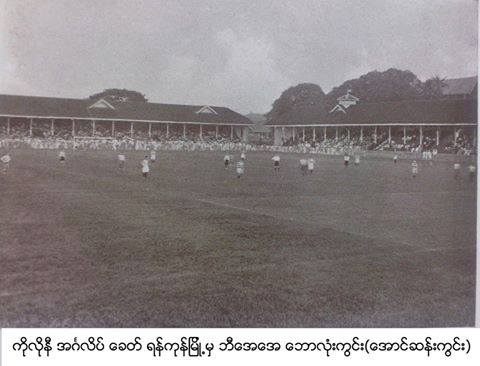
- Location: Rangoon, Burma
- Country: Burma
- Establishment: 1927 (first recorded match)
- As of 8 October 2011; Source: Ground profile

The Burma Athletic Association Ground (BAA Ground) was a cricket ground in Rangoon, Burma (today Yangon, Myanmar). It was built as an athletic ground in 1906, which was completed in 1909, where many sports were held such as cricket, football and tennis. The first and only recorded match on the ground came in 1927 when Burma played its only first-class match against the touring Marylebone Cricket Club. The match ended in a heavy defeat for Burma. Cricket in Burma (which was at the time administered as part of the British Raj) was a mainly British affair, with the game played by British officials. With Burmese independence in 1948, cricket became largely extinct in the country, and The BAA Ground was renovated and renamed as Bogyoke Aung San Stadium in 1953.
