= Rangoon Gymkhana cricket team =

Rangoon Gymkhana cricket team was a scratch cricket team formed in Rangoon, Burma. The team played a single first-class match in January 1927 at the Gymkhana Ground against the touring Marylebone Cricket Club (MCC), resulting in a draw.

A second scratch eleven was formed to play MCC on the following days at the Burma Athletic Association Ground. This time the team was styled 'Burma'. Both teams were captained by Hubert Ashton, the Cambridge University and Essex batsman. Six men appeared for both Burmese teams. All were European officials. Until 1937, Burma was administered as part of India.
