= 1998 ACC Trophy =

- Administrator: Asian Cricket Council
- Cricket format: 50 overs per side
- Tournament format: Round robin with knockouts
- Host: Nepal
- Champions: Bangladesh (2nd title)
- Participants: 10 teams
- Matches: 23/23
- Player of the series: (Bangladesh) Aminul Islam
- Most runs: (United Arab Emirates) Saeed-al-Saffar (236)
- Most wickets: (Bangladesh) Aminul Islam (14)

The 1998 ACC Trophy was a cricket tournament in Nepal, taking place from 3 October to 13 October 1998. It gave Associate and Affiliate members of the Asian Cricket Council experience of international one-day cricket and also helped form an essential part of regional rankings. The tournament was won by Bangladesh who defeated Malaysia in the final by 8 wickets. This would be Bangladesh's final ACC Trophy title prior to their elevation to Test status in 2000.

== Teams ==
The teams were separated into two groups of five. The following teams took part in the tournament:

- Bangladesh
- Malaysia
- Maldives
- Papua New Guinea
- Singapore
- Hong Kong
- Japan
- Nepal
- Thailand
- United Arab Emirates

== Group stages ==
The top two from each group qualified for the semi-finals.

=== Group A ===
Team	Pld	W	L	A	NR	NRR	Pts
Bangladesh	4	3	0	0	1	2.638	7
Malaysia	4	3	1	0	0	–0.269	6
Singapore	4	1	2	0	1	–0.880	3
Maldives	4	1	2	0	1	–1.396	2
Papua New Guinea	4	0	3	0	1	–0.901	1
source=Cricinfo

3 October 1998
(scorecard)

Bangladesh	v	Papua New Guinea

Match abandoned
Tribhuvan University Cricket Ground, Kirtipur
Umpires: Cyril Cooray & Virinchirpuram Ramaswamy

- Points: Bangladesh 1; Papua New Guinea 1

3 October 1998
(scorecard)

Maldives	v	Singapore

Match abandoned
St Xavier's School Ground, Kathmandu
Umpires: Cyril Cooray & Virinchirpuram Ramaswamy

- Points: Maldives 1; Singapore 1

4 October 1998
(scorecard)

Malaysia; 156 all out (43.4 overs)	v	Maldives; 69/4 (26 overs)
Rohan Selvaratnam 37 (56); Hassan Ibrahim 3/19 (9 overs)		Mohammad Aflah 25 (73); Ramesh Menon 3/10 (9 overs)

Malaysia won on faster scoring rate
St Xavier's School Ground, Kathmandu
Umpires: Ignatius Anandappa & Feroz Butt
Player of the match: Hassan Ibrahim (Maldives)

- Match reduced to 45 overs

5 October 1998
(scorecard)

Bangladesh; 239/9 (50 overs)	v	Malaysia; 98 all out (31.5 overs)
Javed Omar 81 (142); Siswanto Haidi 3/54 (7 overs)		Ramesh Menon 20 (32); Aminul Islam 4/15 (8.5 overs)

Bangladesh won by 141 runs
Pulchok Engineering Campus Ground No 2, Lalitpur
Umpires: Shyam Bansal & Siddiq Khan
Player of the match: Javed Omar (Bangladesh)

5 October 1998
(scorecard)

Papua New Guinea; 157 all out (36.4 overs)	v	Singapore; 158/5 (43.1 overs)
Aukuma Noka 58 (52); Rex Martens 3/41 (7.4 overs)		Zubin Shroff 51 (82); John Ovia 2/19 (10 overs)

Singapore won by 5 wickets
Pulchok Engineering Campus Ground, Lalitpur
Umpires: Arani Jayaprakash & Riazuddin
Player of the match: Zubin Shroff (Singapore)

7 October 1998
(scorecard)

Bangladesh; 279/8 (47 overs)	v	Singapore; 158/8 (47 overs)
Faruk Ahmed 58 (74); Ravi Thambinayagam 3/22 (4 overs)		Zubin Shroff 73* (132); Aminul Islam 3/23 (9 overs)

Bangladesh won by 121 runs
Tribhuvan University Cricket Ground, Kirtipur
Umpires: Shyam Bansal & Virinchirpuram Ramaswamy
Player of the match: Aminul Islam (Bangladesh)

- Match reduced to 47 overs

7 October 1998
(scorecard)

Malaysia; 170 all out (48.5 overs)	v	Papua New Guinea; 105 all out (27.4 overs)
Kunjiraman Ramadas 54 (74); John Ovia 3/27 (10 overs)		Keimelo Vuivagi 26 (25); Suresh Navaratnam 3/18 (5 overs)

Malaysia won by 65 runs
Pulchok Engineering Campus Ground, Lalitpur
Umpires: Riazuddin & Udaya Wickremasinghe
Player of the match: Kunjiraman Ramadas (Malaysia)

8 October 1998
(scorecard)

Bangladesh; 206/9 (41 overs)	v	Maldives; 104 all out (29.3 overs)
Javed Omar 47 (90); Ahmed Amir 4/20 (6 overs)		Mohammad Aflah 26 (33); Hasibul Hossain 4/35 (5.3 overs)

Bangladesh won by 102 runs
St Xavier's School Ground, Kathmandu
Umpires: Ignatius Anandappa & Feroz Butt
Player of the match: Hasibul Hossain (Bangladesh)

- Match reduced to 41 overs

8 October 1998
(scorecard)

Singapore; 129/9 (39 overs)	v	Malaysia; 132/5 (34.2 overs)
Ravi Thambinayagam 29 (32); Marimuthu Muniandy 4/19 (8 overs)		Ramesh Menon 56* (95); Aminul Islam 3/23 (9 overs)

Malaysia won by 5 wickets
Tribhuvan University Cricket Ground, Kirtipur
Umpires: Cyril Cooray & Virinchirpuram Ramaswamy
Player of the match: Ramesh Menon (Malaysia)

- Match reduced to 39 overs

9 October 1998
(scorecard)

Maldives	v	Papua New Guinea

Maldives won by a walk-over
Pulchok Engineering Campus Ground, Lalitpur
Umpires: Thammahetti Samarasinghe & Siddiq Khan

- Papua New Guinea left Nepal on October 8, as otherwise they would have had to wait for another week to catch the next flight available.

=== Group B ===
Team	Pld	W	L	A	NR	NRR	Pts
Hong Kong	4	3	0	0	1	4.884	7
United Arab Emirates	4	3	0	0	1	4.062	7
Thailand	4	1	2	0	1	–3.044	3
Nepal	4	0	2	0	2	–2.030	2
Japan	4	0	3	0	1	–2.993	1
source=Cricinfo

3 October 1998
(scorecard)

Hong Kong	v	United Arab Emirates

Match abandoned
Pulchowk Engineering Campus Ground, Lalitpur
Umpires: Riazuddin & Udaya Wickremasinghe

- Points: Hong Kong 1; United Arab Emirates 1

3 October 1998
(scorecard)

Nepal	v	Japan

Match abandoned
Pulchowk Engineering Campus Ground No 2, Lalitpur
Umpires: Ignatius Anandappa & Shyam Bansal

- Points: Nepal 1; Japan 1

4 October 1998
(scorecard)

Nepal	v	Thailand

Match abandoned
Tribhuvan University Cricket Ground, Kirtipur
Umpires: Cyril Cooray & Siddiq Khan

- Points: Nepal 1; Thailand 1

5 October 1998
(scorecard)

Japan; 18 all out (20.2 overs)	v	Hong Kong; 22/1 (2.3 overs)
Takashi Kato 4* (18); Rahul Sharma 6/3 (5.2 overs)		Sada Hussain 13* (9); Ken Wadano 1/18 (1.3 overs)

Hong Kong won by 9 wickets
Tribhuvan University Cricket Ground, Kirtipur
Umpires: Feroz Butt & Udaya Wickremasinghe
Player of the match: Rahul Sharma (Hong Kong)

5 October 1998
(scorecard)

United Arab Emirates; 364/4 (50 overs)	v	Thailand; 72 all out (32 overs)
Saeed-al-Saffar 209* (136); Anil Tanwani 2/65 (9 overs)		Anil Tanwani 16 (29); Saeed-al-Saffar 4/11 (4 overs)

United Arab Emirates won by 292 runs
St Xavier's School Ground, Kathmandu
Umpires: Virinchirpuram Ramaswamy & Thammahetti Samarasinghe
Player of the match: Saeed-al-Saffar (UAE)

7 October 1998
(scorecard)

Thailand; 125 all out (43 overs)	v	Hong Kong; 126/4 (13.3 overs)
Chalee Kader 22 (47); Sada Hussain 3/20 (7 overs)		Sada Hussain 53 (33); Chalee Kader 2/14 (3 overs)

Hong Kong won by 6 wickets
St Xavier's School Ground, Kathmandu
Umpires: Cyril Cooray & (Unknown)
Player of the match: Sada Hussain (Hong Kong)

7 October 1998
(scorecard)

United Arab Emirates; 273 all out (44.1 overs)	v	Japan; 70 all out (29.1 overs)
Babar Malik 82 (54); Jummei Hanada 3/52 (7.1 overs)		Jummei Hanada 24 (73); Shehzad Altaf 6/13 (10 overs)

United Arab Emirates won by 203 runs
Pulchowk Engineering Campus Ground, Lalitpur
Umpires: Arani Jayaprakash & Thammahetti Samarasinghe
Player of the match: Shehzad Altaf (UAE)

8 October 1998
(scorecard)

Thailand; 130 all out (36 overs)	v	Japan; 85 all out (34.3 overs)
Colin Devonshire 42 (60); Ken Wadano 3/27 (8 overs)		Yoichi Sato 23 (43); Arvinder Singh 4/16 (10 overs)

Thailand won by 45 runs
Pulchowk Engineering Campus Ground, Lalitpur
Umpires: Shyam Bansal & Siddiq Khan
Player of the match: Colin Devonshire (Thailand)

8 October 1998
(scorecard)

United Arab Emirates; 222 all out (49.4 overs)	v	Nepal; 128 all out (38.1 overs)
Nasir Siddiqi 61 (102); Dipendra Chaudhary 6/46 (8.4 overs)		Rajesh Chaudhary 29 (43); Mohammad Tauqir 5/36 (10 overs)

United Arab Emirates won by 94 runs
Pulchowk Engineering Campus Ground No 2, Lalitpur
Umpires: Arani Jayaprakash & Riazuddin
Player of the match: Mohammad Tauqir (UAE)

9 October 1998
(scorecard)

Nepal; 150 all out (38 overs)	v	Hong Kong; 154/4 (28.1 overs)
Dipendra Chaudhary 35 (61); Mohammad Zubair 4/38 (10 overs)		Rahul Sharma 41* (45); Rajesh Chaudhary 1/18 (3 overs)

Hong Kong won by 6 wickets
Pulchowk Engineering Campus Ground, Lalitpur
Umpires: Feroz Butt & Udaya Wickremasinghe
Player of the match: Rahul Sharma (Hong Kong)

== Semi-finals ==
10 October 1998
(scorecard)

United Arab Emirates; 103 all out (46.3 overs)	v	Bangladesh; 106/4 (32 overs)
Mahmood Pir Baksh 29 (84); Aminul Islam 3/6 (3.3 overs)		Aminul Islam 34 (53); Mohammad Tauqir 3/28 (8 overs)

Bangladesh won by 6 wickets
Tribhuvan University Cricket Ground, Kirtipur
Umpires: Shyam Bansal & Cyril Cooray
Player of the match: Mohammad Rafique (Bangladesh)

11 October 1998
(scorecard)

Malaysia; 174/9 (40 overs)	v	Hong Kong; 133 all out (36.4 overs)
Suresh Singh 48 (88); Stewart Brew 4/38 (8 overs)		Rahul Sharma 50 (79); Marimuthu Muniandy 4/11 (6 overs)

Malaysia won by 41 runs
Tribhuvan University Cricket Ground, Kirtipur
Umpires: Shyam Bansal & Riazuddin
Player of the match: Marimuthu Muniandy (Malaysia)

- Match reduced to 40 overs

== Final ==
13 October 1998
(scorecard)

Malaysia; 83 all out (37.2 overs)	v	Bangladesh; 85/2 (21.2 overs)
Rohan Selvaratnam 25 (71); Aminul Islam 3/22 (8 overs)		Shahriar Hossain 51 (72); Matthew William 1/5 (3 overs)

Bangladesh won by 8 wickets
Tribhuvan University Cricket Ground, Kirtipur
Umpires: Cyril Cooray & Riazuddin
Player of the match: Shahriar Hossain (Bangladesh)

== Statistics ==
Most runs		Most wickets	
(United Arab Emirates) Saeed-al-Saffar	236	(Bangladesh) Aminul Islam	14
(Bangladesh) Javed Omar	185	(Hong Kong) Rahul Sharma	13
(United Arab Emirates) Nasir Siddiqi	155	(Malaysia) Marimuthu Muniandy	13
(Bangladesh) Shahriar Hossain	152	(Malaysia) Ramesh Menon	10
(Bangladesh) Aminul Islam	150	(United Arab Emirates) Mohammad Tauqir	9
