= 2000 ACC Trophy =

- Administrator: Asian Cricket Council
- Cricket format: 50 overs per side
- Tournament format(s): Round robin and knockout
- Host: United Arab Emirates
- Champions: United Arab Emirates (1st title)
- Participants: 8
- Matches: 15
- Player of the series: (Hong Kong) Rahul Sharma
- Most runs: (Hong Kong) Rahul Sharma (323)
- Most wickets: (United Arab Emirates) Mohammad Tauqir (11)
- Official website: CricketArchive

The 2000 ACC Trophy was a cricket tournament held from 15 to 24 November 2000 in the United Arab Emirates. It gave Associate and Affiliate members of the Asian Cricket Council experience of international one-day cricket and also helped form an essential part of regional rankings.

The tournament was won by the host nation, who defeated Hong Kong in the final by three wickets. This was the United Arab Emirates' first title.

== Teams ==
The following eight teams took part in the tournament:

- Hong Kong
- Kuwait
- Malaysia
- Singapore
- Japan
- Maldives
- Nepal
- United Arab Emirates

== Group stages ==
The eight teams were divided into two groups of four, with the top two from each group qualifying for the semi-finals.

=== Group A ===
Team	Pld	W	L	NR	NRR	Pts
Hong Kong	3	3	0	0	1.442	6
Malaysia	3	2	1	0	0.071	4
Kuwait	3	1	2	0	–0.983	2
Singapore	3	0	3	0	–0.579	0

15 November 2000
(scorecard)

Hong Kong; 209 all out (49.3 overs)	v	Malaysia; 192 all out (49.5 overs)
Stewart Brew 59 (96); Rohan Suppiah 3/32 (10 overs)		Yazid Imran 55 (54); Sher Lama 3/27 (10 overs)

Hong Kong won by 17 runs
Sharjah Cricket Association Stadium, Sharjah
Umpires: Mohammad Nazir & Nasir Butt
Player of the match: Stewart Brew (Hong Kong)

15 November 2000
(scorecard)

Singapore; 257/6 (50 overs)	v	Kuwait; 260/7 (49 overs)
Andrew Scott 103* (152); Z.N. Butt 2/30 (8 over)		Mohammad Nawaz 94 (94); Rishi Kaul 3/38 (10 overs)

Kuwait won by 3 wickets
Dubai Cricket Council Ground No 1, Dubai
Umpires: Lalith Jayasundara & Satyajit Sarkar
Player of the match: Mohammad Nawaz (Kuwait)

16 November 2000
(scorecard)

Hong Kong; 270/8 (50 overs)	v	Singapore; 217/6 (50 overs)
Rahul Sharma 95 (121); Rishi Kaul 3/48 (10 overs)		Andrew Scott 58 (90); Alexander French 3/43 (10 overs)

Hong Kong won by 53 runs
Dubai Cricket Council Ground No 1, Dubai
Umpires: Shyam Bansal & Nasir Butt

16 November 2000
(scorecard)

Malaysia; 236/9 (50 overs)	v	Kuwait; 231 all out (49.2 overs)
Suresh Navaratnam 56 (74); Z.N. Butt 3/36 (10 overs)		Abdullah Iftikhar 66 (101); Marimuthu Muniandy 3/35 (7.2 overs)

Malaysia won by 5 runs
Dubai Cricket Council Ground No 1, Dubai
Umpires: Manzoor Ali Hassan & Satyajit Sarkar
Player of the match: Suresh Navaratnam (Malaysia)

18 November 2000
(scorecard)

Kuwait; 128 all out (38.2 overs)	v	Hong Kong; 132/2 (21.2 overs)
Mohammad Nawaz 55 (79); Jawaid Iqbal 3/30 (10 overs)		Saleem Malik 58 (57); Z.N. Butt 2/32 (6 overs)

Hong Kong won by 8 wickets
Dubai Cricket Council Ground No 1, Dubai
Umpires: Shyam Bansal & Nasir Butt
Player of the match: Jawaid Iqbal (Hong Kong)

18 November 2000
(scorecard)

Singapore; 196/9 (50 overs)	v	Malaysia; 200/7 (45.4 overs)
Andrew Scott 62 (103); Rohan Suppiah 3/27 (10 overs)		Rohan Selvaratnam 84* (94); Kapila Mendis 3/42 (9 overs)

Malaysia won by 3 wickets
Sharjah Cricket Association Stadium, Sharjah
Umpires: Lalith Jayasundara & Satyajit Sarkar
Player of the match: Rohan Selvaratnam (Malaysia)

=== Group B ===
Team	Pld	W	L	NR	NRR	Pts
United Arab Emirates	3	3	0	0	1.285	6
Nepal	3	2	1	0	0.886	4
Maldives	3	1	2	0	0.461	2
Japan	3	0	3	0	–3.653	0

15 November 2000
(scorecard)

Nepal; 179 all out (49.5 overs)	v	United Arab Emirates; 180/9 (49.3 overs)
Ganesh Thakuri 68 (89); Saeed-al-Saffar 5/41 (9.5 overs)		Saeed-al-Saffar 89 (117); Jay Sarraf 2/20 (7 overs)

United Arab Emirates won by 1 wicket
Dubai Cricket Council Ground No 1, Dubai
Umpires: Shyam Bansal & Sarika Prasad
Player of the match: Saeed-al-Saffar (UAE)

16 November 2000
(scorecard)

Japan; 59 all out (26 overs)	v	Maldives; 60/2 (11.3 overs)
Tetsuo Fuji 9 (27); Ahmed Amir 3/7 (3 overs)		Ali Azim 20 (26); Jummei Hanada 1/10 (2 overs)

Maldives won by 3 wickets
Sharjah Cricket Association Stadium, Sharjah
Umpires: Lalith Jayasundara & Surjit Singh
Player of the match: Imad Ismail (Maldives)

17 November 2000
(scorecard)

Japan; 133 all out (49.5 overs)	v	Nepal; 137/3 (20.3 overs)
Hirokazu Takahashi 28 (74); Binod Das 3/24 (9 overs)		Kiran Agrawal 53* (63); Ken Wadano 1/17 (2 overs)

Nepal won by 7 wickets
Dubai Cricket Council Ground No 2, Dubai
Umpires: Mohammad Nazir & Sarika Prasad
Player of the match: Kiran Agrawal (Nepal)

17 November 2000
(scorecard)

Maldives; 116 all out (45 overs)	v	United Arab Emirates; 117/3 (31.1 overs)
Ismail Nadheem 34 (73); Ahmed Nadeem 3/14 (7 overs)		Nasir Siddiqi 50* (68); Ismail Nihad 1/13 (5 overs)

United Arab Emirates won by 7 wickets
Sharjah Cricket Association Stadium, Sharjah
Umpires: Manzur Rahman & Surjit Singh
Player of the match: Ahmed Nadeem (UAE)

19 November 2000
(scorecard)

Maldives; 191/8 (50 overs)	v	Nepal; 192/5 (48.5 overs)
Ismail Nadheem 38 (27); Jay Sarraf 3/50 (9 overs)		Kiran Agrawal 91 (130); Moosa Kaleem 2/37 (10 overs)

Nepal won by 5 wickets
Sharjah Cricket Association Stadium, Sharjah
Umpires: Mohammad Nazir & Sarika Prasad
Player of the match: Kiran Agrawal (Nepal)

19 November 2000
(scorecard)

Japan; 95 all out (35.1 overs)	v	United Arab Emirates; 98/4 (21 overs)
Hirokazu Takahashi 18 (47); Mohammad Tauqir 6/10 (10 overs)		Babar Malik 30 (41); Ken Wadano 2/18 (5 overs)

United Arab Emirates won by 6 wickets
Dubai Cricket Council Ground No 2, Dubai
Umpires: Manzur Rahman & Surjit Singh
Player of the match: Mohammad Tauqir (UAE)

== Semi-finals ==
21 November 2000
(scorecard)

Hong Kong; 268/3 (50 overs)	v	Nepal; 89 all out (24 overs)
Rahul Sharma 145* (136); Mehboob Alam 1/18 (6 overs)		Raju Khadka 18 (16); Stewart Brew 4/20 (5 overs)

Hong Kong won by 179 runs
Sharjah Cricket Association Stadium, Sharjah
Umpires: Lalith Jayasundara & Mohammad Nazir
Player of the match: Rahul Sharma (Hong Kong)

22 November 2000
(scorecard)

Malaysia; 201 all out (49.1 overs)	v	United Arab Emirates; 204/4 (47.4 overs)
Shankar Retinam 59 (87); Miraj Khaliq 4/33 (10 overs)		Kashif Tareen 69* (88); Suresh Navaratnam 1/34 (10 overs)

United Arab Emirates won by 6 wickets
Sharjah Cricket Association Stadium, Sharjah
Umpires: Shyam Bansal & Mohammad Nazir
Player of the match: Nasir Siddiqi (UAE)

== Final ==
24 November 2000
(scorecard)

Hong Kong; 186 all out (49.4 overs)	v	United Arab Emirates; 191/7 (44 overs)
Rahul Sharma 78 (129); Asim Saeed 4/32 (10 overs)		Mahmood Pir Baksh 56 (89); Mohammad Zubair 4/30 (10 overs)

United Arab Emirates won by 3 wickets
Sharjah Cricket Association Stadium, Sharjah
Umpires: Shyam Bansal & Lalith Jayasundara
Player of the match: Mahmood Pir Baksh (UAE)

== Statistics ==
Most runs		Most wickets	
(Hong Kong) Rahul Sharma	323	(United Arab Emirates) Mohammad Tauqir	11
(Singapore) Andrew Scott	223	(Hong Kong) Stewart Brew	10
(Kuwait) Mohammad Nawaz	185	(United Arab Emirates) Asim Saeed	9
(Hong Kong) Stewart Brew	183	(Kuwait) Z.N. Butt	7
(Hong Kong) Saleem Malik	179	(United Arab Emirates) Saeed-al-Saffar	7
