= Nasir Siddiqi =

Pakistani cricketer (born 1965)

Personal information
- Full name: Mohammad Nasir Siddiqi
- Born: 28 January 1965 (age 61); Lahore, Pakistan
- Batting: Right-handed
- Bowling: Right-arm off-spin

International information
- National side: United Arab Emirates (1998–2004)
- Source: CricketArchive, 11 March 2016

Mohammad Nasir Siddiqi (born 28 January 1965) is a former Pakistani-born cricketer who played for the United Arab Emirates national cricket team between 1998 and 2004. He played as an all-rounder, batting right-handed and bowling right-arm off-spin.

Siddiqi was born in Lahore, Pakistan. He made his debut for the UAE at the 1998 ACC Trophy in Nepal, and in his first match, against Thailand, scored 66 runs from 80 balls, featuring in a 206-run opening partnership with Saeed-al-Saffar. He scored another half-century later in the tournament, top-scoring with 61 against Nepal. Siddiqi remained in good form at the 2000 ACC Trophy, which the UAE hosted. He again scored two half-centuries, making 50 not out against the Maldives and 53 not out against Malaysia.

At the 2001 ICC Trophy in Canada, Siddiqi featured in only two of the UAE's matches, against Canada and Scotland. The following year, he represented the UAE at the Hong Kong International Sixes tournament. Siddiqi's final international appearances came at the 2004 ICC Six Nations Challenge, which the UAE hosted and where matches held List A status. He featured in four of his team's five matches, but had little success batting, scoring only 41 runs across his four innings. He had greater success as a bowler, however, taking five wickets including 3/30 against Namibia.
