= List of Hong Kong cricket captains =

This is a list of all cricketers who have captained Hong Kong in an official international match. This includes One Day Internationals and ICC Trophy games. The table is correct as of Hong Kong vs Pakistan on July 18, 2004.

== One Day International ==
Hong Kong played their first ODI on July 24, 2004.

Hong Kong ODI Captains
No	Name	Year	Played	Won	Tied	Lost	NR
1	Rahul Sharma	2004	20	6	2	12	0
2	Tabarak Dar	2008	2	0	0	2	0
3	Jamie Atkinson	2014–2018	4	0	0	4	0
4	N.Khan	2018 - Present	10	4	5	3	0
Overall			14	4	0	8	9

== T20 International ==
Hong Kong played their first T20I on July 24, 2014.

Hong Kong T20I Captains
No.	Name	Year	Played	Won	Tied	Lost	NR
1	Jamie Atkinson	2014-2015	4	2	0	2	0
2	Tanwir Afzal	2014–Present	4	3	0	1	0
3	Babar Hayat	2014–Present	4	2	0	2	0
4	Kinchit Shah	2014–Present	4	0	0	4	0
5	Aizaz Khan	2014–Present	16	6	0	10	0
Overall			32	11	0	19	0

== Under-19s ==
Hong Kong played their first T20I on July 24, 2014.

Hong Kong Under-19s Captains
No.	Name	Year	Played	Won	Tied	Lost	NR
1	Jamie Atkinson	2014-2015	6	1	0	5	0
Overall			6	1	0	5	0

== ICC Trophy ==
Hong Kong debuted in the ICC Trophy in the 1982 tournament

Hong Kong ICC Trophy Captains
Number	Name	Year	Played	Won	Tied	Lost	No Result
1	Peter Anderson	1982-1986	13	5	0	8	0
2	Glyn Davies	1990-1990	5	2	0	3	0
3	Nigel Stearns	1990-1990	2	2	0	0	0
4	Pat Fordham	1993/94-1996/97	14	6	0	7	1
5	Stewart Brew	1996/97-2001	6	1	0	5	0
Overall			40	16	0	23	1
