= List of sports venues in Dubai =

This is the list of Sports venues in Dubai, UAE.

== Basketball ==
- Basketball Hub Dubai

== Badminton ==
- Hamdan Sports Complex
- Al Nasr Badminton Court
- XSA Badminton Training Center
- Professional Sports Academy
- SIMBR Sports
- Dubai Sports World
- Cosmos Badminton Academy
- Danube Badminton Academy

== Golf ==
- Dubai Desert Golf Classic
- Emirates Golf Club
- Dubai Creek Golf & Yacht Club
- Nad Al Sheba Club
- The Montgomerie
- The Dunes being planned
- DWC Golf city (u/c)
- Dubai Golf City (abandoned)
- Trump Golf estate (u/c)

== Multi purpose stadiums ==
- DSC Multi-Purpose Stadium (u/c)
- Al-Maktoum Stadium
- Al-Rashid Stadium
- Zabeel Stadium
- Police Officers Club Stadium
- DSC Indoor Arena (u/c)
- Coca-Cola Arena (u/c)
- Mohammed Bin Rashid Stadium (u/c)
- Maktoum Bin Rashid Al Maktoum Stadium

== Tennis ==
- Aviation Club Tennis Centre
- Aviation Club

== Hockey ==
- DSC Hockey Stadium (u/c)

== Cricket ==
- DSC Cricket Stadium
- Dubai Cricket Council Ground No 1
- Dubai Cricket Council Ground No 2
- ICC Academy Ground
- The Sevens Stadium
- Danube cricket Academy

== Horse racing and Rugby ==
- Meydan Racecourse
- Dubai Exiles Rugby Ground
- The Sevens

== Motorsport ==
- Dubai Autodrome

== Swimming ==
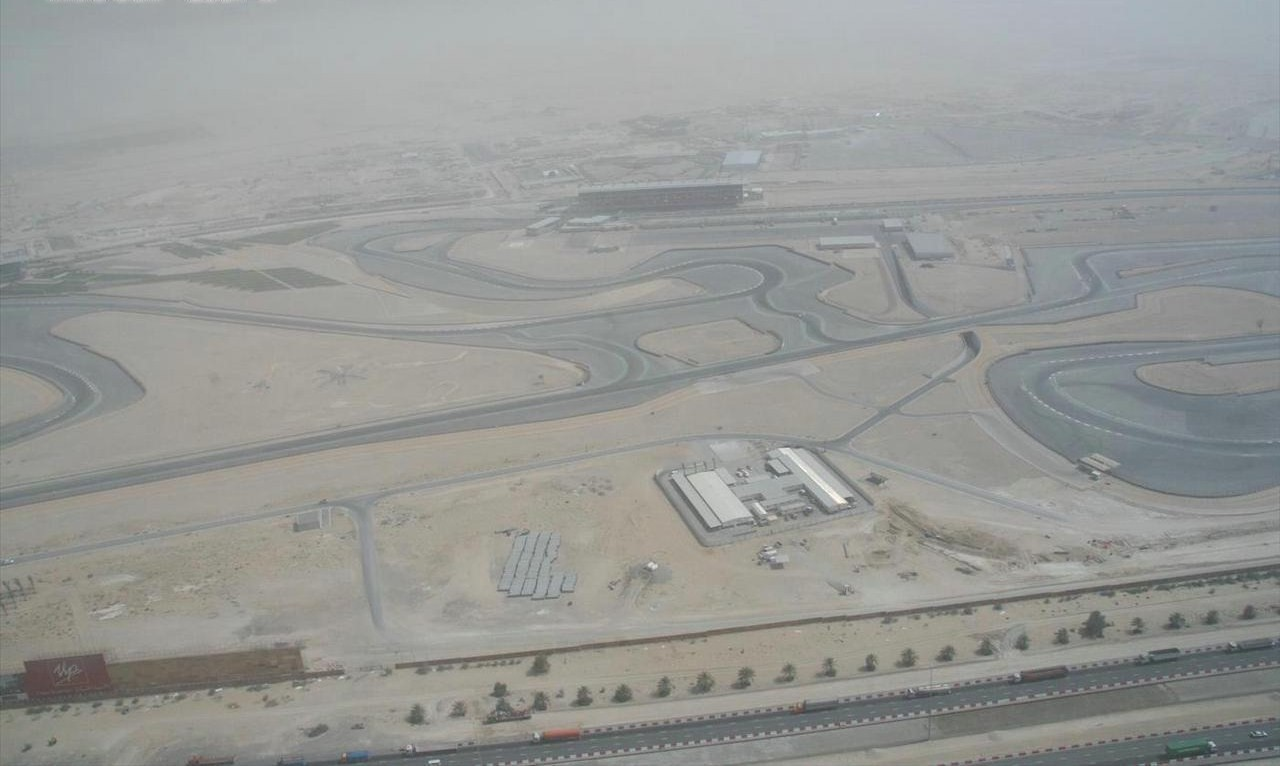
Dubai Autodrome as seen from the air on 1 May 2007

- Wild Wadi Waterpark swimming pools
- Dreamland Aqua Park pools
- Jet-skiing
- Al-Boom Diving
- Dubai Autodrome
- Scuba International
- Hamdan Sports Complex
- Scuba Shade Diving

== Scuba Diving ==
- DiveCampus
- Deep Dive Dubai
- Scuba Shade

== Ice Rink ==
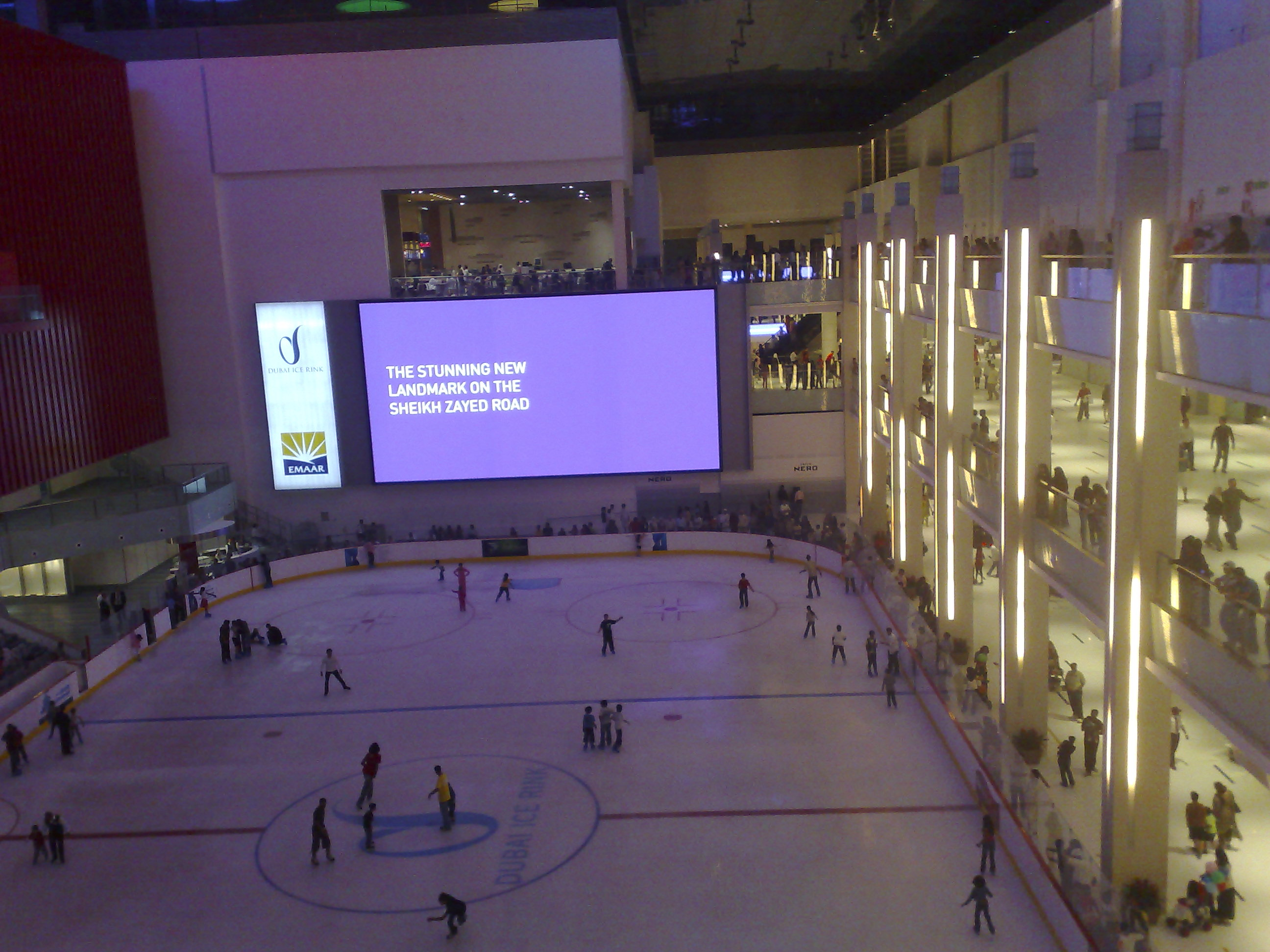
The Olympic Sized Ice-Rink

- Dubai Ice Rink

== See also ==
- Dubai Sports City
- List of development projects in Dubai
