= 2026 ACC Men's Premier Cup =

International associate cricket tournament

- Tournament logo
- Dates: 30 August – 12 September 2026
- Administrator: Asian Cricket Council
- Cricket format: Limited overs cricket One Day International
- Tournament format(s): Group stage and knockout stage
- Host: Malaysia
- Champions: Nepal (2nd title)
- Runners-up: United Arab Emirates
- Participants: 10
- Matches: 24
- Most runs: (Malaysia) Virandeep Singh (273)
- Most wickets: (Nepal) Sandeep Lamichhane (17)

The 2026 ACC Men's Premier Cup was the third edition of the ACC Men's Premier Cup, hosted by the Malaysian Cricket Association from 30 August to 12 September 2026. Ten associate teams competed in 24 matches across two venues in Malaysia, of which eight teams directly qualified for the tournament through their performance in the 2024 Premier Cup and two advanced from the 2026 Challenger Cup. The 50-over format defending champions, Nepal, defeated the 20-over format defending champions, the United Arab Emirates, in the final, to win their second title. Nepal qualified for the 2027 Asia Cup.

== Background ==
The ACC Men's Premier Cup is a biennial international cricket competition in limited overs cricket format (an alternating format of 50-overs and 20-overs cricket), organised by the Asian Cricket Council (ACC) since its inauguration in 2023. The competition is played by the top associate members of the ACC advancing from the ACC Men's Challenger Cup to determine qualification for the Asia Cup and the Asia Cup Rising Stars. Nepal were the 50-over format defending champions having won the 2023 edition, while the United Arab Emirates were the 20-over format defending champions having won the 2024 edition.

=== Format ===
The ten participating teams were divided into two groups of five teams each. In the group stage, each team played each of the other teams in the group once in a round-robin format for 20 matches, and the top two teams in each group advanced to the knockout stage. The knockout stage consisted of two semi-finals, a third-place play-off and a final. In the 2026 tournament, all of the matches were played in 50-over format, of which only the matches involving associate teams with ODI status had international status as One Day International (ODI), while other matches were played without international status.

=== Venues ===
Premier Cup tournament venues in Malaysia

The tournament was played across two venues in Malaysia, twelve matches at the UKM-YSD Cricket Oval in Bangi (including semi-final 2 and the 3rd place play-off) and twelve matches at the Bayuemas Oval in Pandamaran (including semi-final 1 and the final).

== Teams and qualification ==
The top eight associate teams from the 2024 Premier Cup – Bahrain, Hong Kong, Kuwait, Nepal, Oman, Qatar, Saudi Arabia and the United Arab Emirates – directly qualified for the 2026 Premier Cup, while the next ranked ten teams in the ICC T20I rankings – Bhutan, Cambodia, China, Indonesia, Malaysia, Maldives, Myanmar, Singapore, Thailand, and Uzbekistan – played in the Challenger Cup. The top two teams in the 2026 Challenger Cup – Malaysia and Singapore – advanced to the Premier Cup.

=== 2026 Challenger Cup ===
2026 ACC Men's Challenger Cup
- Tournament logo
- Dates: 10 – 20 June 2026
- Administrator: Asian Cricket Council
- Cricket format: Limited overs cricket
- Tournament format(s): Group stage and knockout stage
- Host: Singapore
- Champions: Malaysia (1st title)
- Runners-up: Singapore
- Participants: 10
- Matches: 16

The 2026 ACC Men's Challenger Cup was the third edition of the ACC Men's Challenger Cup, a biennial international cricket competition in limited overs cricket format, an alternating format of 50-overs and 20-overs cricket. Organised by the ACC since its inauguration in 2023, the competition is played by the associate members of the ACC, with the top teams advancing to the Premier Cup.

It was hosted by the Singapore Cricket Association from 10 to 20 June 2026 with ten teams competing in 16 matches across two venues in Singapore: 10 matches at Singapore National Cricket Ground including quarter-finals 2 and 4, semi-final 2, and the final) and six matches at Singa Oval (including quarter-finals 1 and 3, semi-final 1, and the 3rd place play-off).

The 10 participating teams were divided into four groups: two groups of three teams and two groups of two teams. In the group stage, each team played each of the other teams in the group once in a round-robin format for a total of eight matches from 10 to 13 June 2026. The top two teams from each group – Malaysia and China from group A, Singapore and Maldives from group B, Thailand and Bhutan from group C and Indonesia and Uzbekistan from group D – advanced to the knockout stage.

The knockout stage consisted of four quarter-finals played on 15 and 16 June, two semi-finals played on 18 June, a 3rd place play-off, and a final played on 20 June. The top two teams (winners of the semi-finals / finalists): Malaysia and Singapore qualified for the Premier Cup.

Group A fixtures

Group A standings
Pos	Team	Pld	W	L	NR	Pts	NRR	Qualification
1	Malaysia	1	1	0	0	2	3.532	Advanced to the knockout stage
2	China	1	0	1	0	0	−3.532	Advanced to the knockout stage

Source: Asian Cricket Council

Match 1
10 June 2026
Scorecard

China; 86 (32.3 overs)	v	Malaysia; 88/3 (16.1 overs)

Malaysia won by 7 wickets
Singa Oval, Singapore
Umpires: Anand Natarajan (Sin) and Ugyen Dorji (Bhu)

- Malaysia won the toss and elected to field.

Group B fixtures

Group B standings
Pos	Team	Pld	W	L	NR	Pts	NRR	Qualification
1	Singapore (H)	2	1	0	1	3	2.388	Advanced to the knockout stage
2	Maldives	2	1	1	0	2	1.692	Advanced to the knockout stage
3	Myanmar	2	0	1	1	1	−4.420	Eliminated

Source: Asian Cricket Council
(H) Hosts

Match 2
10 June 2026
Scorecard

Maldives; 138 (33.2 overs)	v	Singapore; 139/4 (24.5 overs)

Singapore won by 6 wickets
Singapore National Cricket Ground, Singapore
Umpires: Samad Akbar (Tha) and Narayanan Sivan (Mas)

- Singapore won the toss and elected to field.

Match 6
12 June 2026
Scorecard

Singapore; 62/1 (15.2 overs)	v	Myanmar

No result
Singapore National Cricket Ground, Singapore
Umpires: Samad Akbar (Tha) and Ugyen Dorji (Bhu)

- Singapore won the toss and elected to bat.
- No further play was possible due to rain.

Match 8
13 June 2026
Scorecard

Maldives; 340 (50 overs)	v	Myanmar; 119 (26 overs)

Maldives won by 221 runs
Singapore National Cricket Ground, Singapore
Umpires: Riaz Ur Rehman (Idn) and Venu Madhav (Sin)

- Myanmar won the toss and elected to field.

Group C fixtures

Group C standings
Pos	Team	Pld	W	L	NR	Pts	NRR	Qualification
1	Thailand	1	0	0	1	1	—	Advanced to the knockout stage
2	Bhutan	1	0	0	1	1	—	Advanced to the knockout stage

Source: Asian Cricket Council

Match 3
11 June 2026
Scorecard

Bhutan	v	Thailand

Match abandoned
Singa Oval, Singapore

- Thailand won the toss and were considered winners of the match.
- No play was possible due to wet conditions.

Group D fixtures

Group D standings
Pos	Team	Pld	W	L	NR	Pts	NRR	Qualification
1	Indonesia	2	2	0	0	4	6.620	Advanced to the knockout stage
2	Uzbekistan	2	1	1	0	2	−6.620	Advanced to the knockout stage
3	Cambodia	2	0	2	0	0	—	Eliminated

Source: Asian Cricket Council

Match 4
11 June 2026
Scorecard

Cambodia	v	Indonesia

Indonesia won (walkover without a ball bowled)
Singapore National Cricket Ground, Singapore

- No toss.
- Cambodia forfeited the match.

Match 5
12 June 2026
Scorecard

Cambodia	v	Uzbekistan

Uzbekistan won (walkover without a ball bowled)
Singapore National Cricket Ground, Singapore

- No toss.
- Cambodia forfeited the match.

Match 7
13 June 2026
Scorecard

Indonesia; 387/6 (50 overs)	v	Uzbekistan; 66/9 (18.2 overs)

Indonesia won by 321 runs
Singapore National Cricket Ground, Singapore
Umpires: Hardeep Jadeja (Sin) and Imad Ismail (Mdv)

- Indonesia won the toss and elected to bat.

Knockout stage fixtures

Quarter-finals
A1	Malaysia	43/1 (4.1 overs)
D2	Uzbekistan	42 (19.2 overs)
C1	Thailand	296 (45 overs)
B2	Maldives	201 (39.2 overs)
D1	Indonesia	97/2 (13.3 overs)
A2	China	96 (36.2 overs)
B1	Singapore	338 (49.3 overs)
C2	Bhutan	222/7 (50 overs)

Semi-finals
QF1W	Malaysia	291/9 (31 overs)
QF3W	Thailand	73 (19.5 overs)
QF2W	Indonesia	196 (41.1 overs)
QF4W	Singapore	197/4 (29.2 overs)

Final
SF1W	Malaysia	247/4 (19.2 overs)
SF2W	Singapore	243 (24 overs)
3rd place play-off
SF1L	Thailand	186/4 (20 overs); 12/0 (Super Over)
SF2L	Indonesia	186 (19.5 overs); 11/2 (Super Over)

Quarter-final 1
15 June 2026
Scorecard

Uzbekistan; 42 (19.2 overs)	v	Malaysia; 43/1 (4.1 overs)

Malaysia won by 9 wickets
Singa Oval, Singapore
Umpires: Hardeep Jadeja (Sin) and Riaz Ur Rehman (Idn)

- Malaysia won the toss and elected to field.

Quarter-final 2
15 June 2026
Scorecard

China; 96 (36.2 overs)	v	Indonesia; 97/2 (13.3 overs)

Indonesia won by 8 wickets
Singapore National Cricket Ground, Singapore
Umpires: Venu Madhav (Sin) and Ugyen Dorji (Bhu)

- China won the toss and elected to bat.

Quarter-final 3
16 June 2026
09:30 UTC+8
Scorecard

Thailand; 296 (45 overs)	v	Maldives; 201 (39.2 overs)

Thailand won by 95 runs
Singa Oval, Singapore
Umpires: Foyej Ahmed (Sin) and Anand Natarajan (Sin)

- Maldives won the toss and elected to field.

Quarter-final 4
16 June 2026
Scorecard

Singapore; 338 (49.3 overs)	v	Bhutan; 222/7 (50 overs)

Singapore won by 116 runs
Singapore National Cricket Ground, Singapore
Umpires: Narayanan Sivan (Mas) and Samad Akbar (Tha)

- Bhutan won the toss and elected to field.

Semi-final 1
18 June 2026
Scorecard

Malaysia; 291/9 (31 overs)	v	Thailand; 73 (19.5 overs)

Malaysia won by 218 runs
Singa Oval, Singapore
Umpires: Anand Natarajan (Sin) and Hardeep Jadeja (Sin)

- Thailand won the toss and elected to field.

Semi-final 2
18 June 2026
Scorecard

Indonesia; 196 (41.1 overs)	v	Singapore; 197/4 (29.2 overs)

Singapore won by 6 wickets
Singapore National Cricket Ground, Singapore
Umpires: Samad Akbar (Tha) and Ugyen Dorji (Bhu)

- Singapore won the toss and elected to field.

3rd place play-off
20 June 2026
Scorecard

Thailand; 186/4 (20 overs)	v	Indonesia; 186 (19.5 overs)

Match tied (Thailand won the Super Over)
Singa Oval, Singapore

- Indonesia won the toss and elected to field.
- Super Over: Indonesia 11/2, Thailand 12/0

Final
20 June 2026
Scorecard

Singapore; 243 (24 overs)	v	Malaysia; 247/4 (19.2 overs)

Malaysia won by 6 wickets
Singapore National Cricket Ground, Singapore

- Malaysia won the toss and elected to field.

== Squads ==
The following squads were announced for the tournament:

- Bahrain: Fiaz Ahmed, Sohail Ahmed, Asif Ali (c), Imran Anwar, Junaid Aziz, Rizwan Butt, Ali Dawood, Prashant Kurup (wk), Abdul Majid, Ahmer Bin Nasir, Yaseer Nazeer, Amaish Rana, Shujaat Rasool, Muhammad Salman, Asif Shaikh, Muhammad Wasim
- Hong Kong: Zeeshan Ali (wk), Kalhan Challu, Mohammad Ghazanfar, Babar Hayat, Ateeq Iqbal, Aizaz Khan, Ehsan Khan, Hassan Khan Mohammad, Yasim Murtaza (c), Nasrulla Rana, Anshuman Rath, Kinchit Shah, Ayush Shukla, Shahid Wasif
- Kuwait: Ummer Abbas, Mohammad Aslam (c), Meet Bhavsar (wk), Sandaruwan Chinthaka (wk), Muhammad Aqif Farooq, Adnan Idrees, Nimish Lathief, Vishwa Teja Nettem, Yasin Patel, Ravija Sandaruwan, Mohamed Shafeeq, Bilal Tahir, Abdullah Zaheer, Ali Zaheer
- Malaysia: Muhammad Akram, Syed Aziz (c, wk), Amir Khan, Prashant Madhukar, Saif Ullah Malik, Sharvin Muniandy, Nazmus Sakib (wk), Virandeep Singh (wk), Muhamad Syahadat, Arif Ullah, Vijay Unni, Aqeel Wahid
- Nepal: Basir Ahamad, Dipendra Singh Airee, Hemant Dhami, Gulshan Jha, Sundeep Jora, Karan KC, Dev Khanal, Arjun Kumal (wk), Sandeep Lamichhane (c), Sher Malla, Ishan Pandey, Rohit Paudel, Lalit Rajbanshi, Aasif Sheikh (wk)
- Oman: Shakeel Ahmed, Mujibur Ali, Wasim Ali, Shah Faisal, Muhammed Imran, Nadeem Khan, Hammad Mirza, Jay Odedra, Jiten Ramanandi, Hassnain Shah, Vinayak Shukla (c, wk), Jatinder Singh, Karan Sonavale, Hasnain Ul Wahab
- Qatar: Shahzeb Afridi, Owais Ahmed, Zubair Ali, Muhammad Asim, Amir Farooq, Zeeshan Haider, Shahzaib Jamil (wk), Ikramullah Khan, Daniel Louis, Imal Liyanage (wk), Mirza Mohammed Baig (c), Obaid ur Rahman, Mujeeb-ur-Rehman, Akshay Shankar
- Saudi Arabia: Ishtiaq Ahmad, Manan Ali (wk), Muhammad Atif, Zahid Iqbal, Faisal Khan, Usman Najeeb, Ahmad Raza, Sheikh Shad Saif, Muhammad Saqib, Hisham Sheikh, Syed Naqash Tanveer, Zain Ul Abidin, Waji Ul Hassan (c), Abdul Waheed
- Singapore: Kabir Berlia, Suryansh Gulecha, Girin Gune, Hari Kukreja, Riaan Naik, Yuvaan Pandey, Harman Singh, Manpreet Singh (c), Chandramauli Sridev, Pranav Sudarshan, Daksh Tyagi, Harsh Venkatram, Sai Venugopal (wk), Kabir Zandani (wk)
- United Arab Emirates: Ibrar Ahmad, Haider Ali, Rahul Chopra, Muhammad Jawadullah, Aayan Afzal Khan, Sohaib Khan, Muhammad Mohsin, Akshdeep Nath, Muhammad Shahdad, Aryansh Sharma (wk), Harpreet Singh Bhatia (c), Khuzaima Tanveer, Tanish Suri (wk), Adeeb Usmani (wk)

== Warm-up matches ==
Ahead of the tournament, Nepal toured India in August 2026 to play two warm-up matches against the Karnataka cricket team in preparation for the tournament. Nepal won both matches. Prior to the tournament, Malaysia played two warm-up matches against Nepal and one warm-up match against Kuwait at the Selangor Turf Club in Kuala Lumpur from 25 to 28 August 2026. Malaysia lost all three matches.

Warm-up match 1
25 August 2026
09:30 UTC+8
Scorecard

Malaysia; 232 (48.2 overs)	v	Nepal; 229/1 (28 overs)
Muhamad Syahadat 61 (68); Sandeep Lamichhane 4/53 (10 overs)		Aasif Sheikh 161 (85); Aslam Khan 1/19 (1 over)

Nepal won by 9 wickets (DLS method)
Selangor Turf Club, Kuala Lumpur

- Malaysia won the toss and elected to bat.
- Nepal were set a revised target of 228 runs from 48 overs due to rain.

Warm-up match 2
27 August 2026
09:30 UTC+8
Scorecard

Nepal; 170 (41.4 overs)	v	Malaysia; 143 (40.1 overs)
Rohit Paudel 61 (86); Aqeel Wahid 4/73 (10 overs)		Aqeel Wahid 56 (108); Lalit Rajbanshi 3/20 (5.1 overs)

Nepal won by 27 Runs
Selangor Turf Club, Kuala Lumpur
Umpires: Viswanadan Kalidas (Mas) and Wahib Zada (Mas)
Player of the match: Rohit Paudel (Nep)

- Nepal won the toss and elected to bat.

Warm-up match 3
28 August 2026
09:30 UTC+8
Scorecard

Kuwait; 320/5 (50 overs)	v	Malaysia; 305/8 (50 overs)
Meet Bhavsar 76 (79); Virandeep Singh 2/61 (10 overs)		Saif Ullah Malik 143 (128); Mohamed Shafeeq 5/53 (10 overs)

Kuwait won by 15 runs
Selangor Turf Club, Kuala Lumpur
Umpires: Viswanadan Kalidas (Mas) and Wahib Zada (Mas)
Player of the match: Saif Ullah Malik (Mas)

- Kuwait won the toss and elected to bat.

== Group stage ==
In the group stage, two groups of five teams played in a round-robin format for a total of 20 matches from 30 August to 8 September 2026 across the two venues. The top two teams from each group – Nepal and Hong Kong from group A and the United Arab Emirates and Oman from group B – advanced to the knockout stage.

Group A	Group B
Bahrain; Hong Kong; Malaysia; Nepal; Saudi Arabia	Kuwait; Singapore; Oman; Qatar; United Arab Emirates

=== Group A ===
Group A standings
Pos	Team	Pld	W	L	NR	Pts	NRR	Qualification
1	Nepal	4	3	1	0	6	1.531	Advanced to the knockout stage
2	Hong Kong	4	3	1	0	6	−0.005	Advanced to the knockout stage
3	Malaysia (H)	4	2	2	0	4	0.568	Eliminated
4	Saudi Arabia	4	1	3	0	2	−0.696	Eliminated
5	Bahrain	4	1	3	0	2	−1.188	Eliminated

Source: Cricinfo
(H) Hosts

Match 2
30 August 2026
09:30 UTC+8
Scorecard

Hong Kong; 273 (48.5 overs)	v	Saudi Arabia; 257 (49.2 overs)
Babar Hayat 73 (89); Usman Najeeb 3/53 (8 overs)		Manan Ali 54 (63); Yasim Murtaza 3/53 (10 overs)

Hong Kong won by 16 runs
UKM-YSD Cricket Oval, Bangi
Umpires: Akbar Ali (UAE) and Vinod Babu (Oma)
Player of the match: Yasim Murtaza (HK)

- Hong Kong won the toss and elected to bat.

Match 4
31 August 2026
09:30 UTC+8
Scorecard

Bahrain; 87 (36.2 overs)	v	Nepal; 88/3 (21 overs)
Fiaz Ahmed 15 (15); Sandeep Lamichhane 5/14 (10 overs)		Arjun Kumal 36 * (58); Imran Anwar 2/20 (6 overs)

Nepal won by 7 wickets
UKM-YSD Cricket Oval, Bangi
Umpires: Anand Natarajan (Sin) and Shiju Sam (UAE)
Player of the match: Sandeep Lamichhane (Nep)

- Nepal won the toss and elected to field.

Match 5
1 September 2026
09:30 UTC+8
Scorecard

Malaysia; 270/8 (50 overs)	v	Saudi Arabia; 177 (34 overs)
Muhamad Syahadat 82 (98); Muhammad Saqib 3/42 (8 overs)		Usman Najeeb 64* (29); Vijay Unni 5/34 (9 overs)

Malaysia won by 93 runs
Bayuemas Oval, Pandamaran
Umpires: Vinod Babu (Oma) and Imran Mustafa (Kuw)
Player of the match: Virandeep Singh (Mas)

- Malaysia won the toss and elected to bat.

Match 7
2 September 2026
09:30 UTC+8
Scorecard

Bahrain; 210/8 (50 overs)	v	Hong Kong; 178 (49.4 overs)
Junaid Aziz 47 (60); Yasim Murtaza 3/30 (10 overs)		Shahid Wasif 53 (64); Ali Dawood 4/21 (10 overs)

Bahrain won by 32 runs
Bayuemas Oval, Pandamaran
Umpires: Vinod Babu (Oma) and Anand Natarajan (Sin)
Player of the match: Ali Dawood (Bhr)

- Bahrain won the toss and elected to bat.

Match 10
3 September 2026
09:30 UTC+8
Scorecard

Malaysia; 103 (32.3 overs)	v	Nepal; 106/4 (21.4 overs)
Syed Aziz 30 (49); Karan KC 4/23 (7.3 overs)		Arjun Kumal 45* (68); Syed Aziz 1/19 (4 overs)

Nepal won by 6 wickets
UKM-YSD Cricket Oval, Bangi
Umpires: Imran Mustafa (Kuw) and Shiju Sam (UAE)
Player of the match: Karan KC (Nep)

- Malaysia won the toss and elected to bat.

Match 12
4 September 2026
09:30 UTC+8
Scorecard

Saudi Arabia; 221 (48.4 overs)	v	Bahrain; 204/8 (50 overs)
Abdul Waheed 70 (91); Ali Dawood 3/37 (9.4 overs)		Imran Anwar 49* (59); Muhammad Saqib 2/19 (7 overs)

Saudi Arabia won by 17 runs
UKM-YSD Cricket Oval, Bangi
Umpires: Anand Natarajan (Sin) and Durga Subedi (Nep)
Player of the match: Abdul Waheed (Sau)

- Saudi Arabia won the toss and elected to bat.

Match 14
5 September 2026
09:30 UTC+8
Scorecard

Hong Kong; 209 (46.3 overs)	v	Malaysia; 209/9 (50 overs)
Kalhan Challu 69 (72); Aqeel Wahid 4/39 (10 overs)		Virandeep Singh 82* (106); Hassan Khan Mohammad 2/29 (6 overs)

Match tied (Hong Kong won the Super Over)
UKM-YSD Cricket Oval, Bangi
Umpires: Imran Mustafa (Kuw) and Vinod Babu (Oma)
Player of the match: Anshuman Rath (HK)

- Hong Kong won the toss and elected to bat.
- Super Over: Malaysia 11/1, Hong Kong 14/0

Match 15
6 September 2026
09:30 UTC+8
Scorecard

Saudi Arabia; 190 (49.2 overs)	v	Nepal; 193/5 (41 overs)
Abdul Waheed 77 (89); Sandeep Lamichhane 3/19 (10 overs)		Gulshan Jha 44* (35); Ishtiaq Ahmad 2/23 (5 overs)

Nepal won by 5 wickets
Bayuemas Oval, Pandamaran
Umpires: Akbar Ali (UAE) and Shiju Sam (UAE)
Player of the match: Gulshan Jha (Nep)

- Saudi Arabia won the toss and elected to bat.

Match 17
7 September 2026
09:30 UTC+8
Scorecard

Malaysia; 254/8 (50 overs)	v	Bahrain; 128 (37.5 overs)
Virandeep Singh 98 (118); Imran Anwar 3/56 (9 overs)		Prashant Kurup 34 (55); Aqeel Wahid 4/32 (9.5 overs)

Malaysia won by 126 runs
Bayuemas Oval, Pandamaran
Umpires: Shiju Sam (UAE) and Durga Subedi (Nep)
Player of the match: Virandeep Singh (Mas)

- Malaysia won the toss and elected to bat.

Match 19
8 September 2026
09:30 UTC+8
Scorecard

Hong Kong; 261/7 (50 overs)	v	Nepal; 246 (49.1 overs)
Babar Hayat 117* (126); Sandeep Lamichhane 4/44 (10 overs)		Ishan Pandey 90 (106); Aizaz Khan 4/50 (10 overs)

Hong Kong won by 15 runs
Bayuemas Oval, Pandamaran
Umpires: Akbar Ali (UAE) and Shiju Sam (UAE)
Player of the match: Babar Hayat (HK)

- Hong Kong won the toss and elected to bat.

=== Group B ===
Group B standings
Pos	Team	Pld	W	L	NR	Pts	NRR	Qualification
1	United Arab Emirates	4	4	0	0	8	1.979	Advanced to the knockout stage
2	Oman	4	2	2	0	4	0.649	Advanced to the knockout stage
3	Qatar	4	2	2	0	4	0.227	Eliminated
4	Kuwait	4	2	2	0	4	0.152	Eliminated
5	Singapore	4	0	4	0	0	−3.241	Eliminated

Source: Cricinfo

Match 1
30 August 2026
09:30 UTC+8
Scorecard

Oman; 316/9 (50 overs)	v	Singapore; 185 (42.3 overs)
Vinayak Shukla 88 (56); Harsh Venkatram 3/64 (10 overs)		Manpreet Singh 49 (56); Hassnain Shah 3/29 (7 overs)

Oman won by 131 runs
Bayuemas Oval, Pandamaran
Umpires: Viswanadan Kalidas (Mas) and Durga Subedi (Nep)
Player of the match: Vinayak Shukla (Oma)

- Singapore won the toss and elected to field.

Match 3
31 August 2026
09:30 UTC+8
Scorecard

United Arab Emirates; 263/9 (50 overs)	v	Qatar; 171 (37.3 overs)
Adeeb Usmani 92 (106); Mirza Mohammed Baig 3/62 (9 overs)		Imal Liyanage 70 (82); Haider Ali 2/25 (8 overs)

United Arab Emirates won by 92 runs
Bayuemas Oval, Pandamaran
Umpires: Tabarak Dar (HK) and Imran Mustafa (Kuw)
Player of the match: Adeeb Usmani (UAE)

- United Arab Emirates won the toss and elected to bat.

Match 6
1 September 2026
09:30 UTC+8
Scorecard

Kuwait; 249/4 (43.4 overs)	v	Singapore; 96 (27.3 overs)
Meet Bhavsar 84* (90); Pranav Sudarshan 2/32 (7 overs)		Girin Gune 34* (54); Mohammed Aslam 4/15 (7.3 overs)

Kuwait won by 160 runs (DLS method)
UKM-YSD Cricket Oval, Bangi
Umpires: Akbar Ali (UAE) and Durga Subedi (Nep)
Player of the match: Mohammed Aslam (Kuw)

- Singapore won the toss and elected to field.
- Singapore were set a revised target of 257 runs from 36 overs due to rain.

Match 8
2 September 2026
09:30 UTC+8
Scorecard

Qatar; 272 (50 overs)	v	Oman; 276/5 (40.3 overs)
Zubair Ali 77 (101); Hassnain Shah 4/58 (10 overs)		Hammad Mirza 84* (96); Mirza Mohammed Baig 2/45 (8 overs)

Oman won by 5 wickets
UKM-YSD Cricket Oval, Bangi
Umpires: Tabarak Dar (HK) and Viswanadan Kalidas (Mas)
Player of the match: Hammad Mirza (Oma)

- Oman won the toss and elected to field.

Match 9
3 September 2026
09:30 UTC+8
Scorecard

United Arab Emirates; 286/8 (50 overs)	v	Kuwait; 110/9 (25 overs)
Muhammad Shahdad 94 (110); Muhammad Aqif Farooq 3/38 (6 overs)		Ravija Sandaruwan 26 (42); Akshdeep Nath 6/21 (5 overs)

United Arab Emirates won by 66 runs (DLS method)
Bayuemas Oval, Pandamaran
Umpires: Tabarak Dar (HK) and Viswanadan Kalidas (Mas)
Player of the match: Muhammad Shahdad (UAE)

- United Arab Emirates won the toss and elected to bat.
- Kuwait were set a revised target of 177 runs from 25 overs due to rain.
- Akshdeep Nath (UAE) took his maiden five-wicket haul in List A cricket.

Match 11
4 September 2026
09:30 UTC+8
Scorecard

Singapore; 150 (38.2 overs)	v	Qatar; 153/2 (28.1 overs)
Manpreet Singh 96 (113); Muhammad Asim 6/18 (9.2 overs)		Zubair Ali 55* (79); Harman Singh 1/7 (3 overs)

Qatar won by 8 wickets
Bayuemas Oval, Pandamaran
Umpires: Akbar Ali (UAE) and Shiju Sam (UAE)
Player of the match: Muhammad Asim (Qat)

- Singapore won the toss and elected to bat.
- Muhammad Asim (Qat) took his maiden five-wicket haul in List A cricket.

Match 13
5 September 2026
09:30 UTC+8
Scorecard

Oman; 252/8 (50 overs)	v	Kuwait; 256/6 (49.4 overs)
Jiten Ramanandi 53 (55); Abdullah Zaheer 3/54 (10 overs)		Bilal Tahir 103* (106); Faisal Shah 2/37 (8 overs)

Kuwait won by 4 wickets
Bayuemas Oval, Pandamaran
Umpires: Tabarak Dar (HK) and Viswanadan Kalidas (Mas)
Player of the match: Bilal Tahir (Kuw)

- Oman won the toss and elected to bat.
- Bilal Tahir (Kuw) scored his maiden century in List A cricket.

Match 16
6 September 2026
09:30 UTC+8
Scorecard

Singapore; 172 (47.4 overs)	v	United Arab Emirates; 174/3 (24.3 overs)
Riaan Naik 44 (83); Muhammad Mohsin 4/34 (7.4 overs)		Akshdeep Nath 58 (62); Chandramauli 2/31 (5.3 overs)

United Arab Emirates won by 7 wickets
UKM-YSD Cricket Oval, Bangi
Umpires: Tabarak Dar (HK) and Durga Subedi (Nep)
Player of the match: Aayan Afzal Khan (United Arab Emirates)

- Singapore won the toss and elected to bat.

Match 18
7 September 2026
09:30 UTC+8
Scorecard

Kuwait; 233 (49.5 overs)	v	Qatar; 235/6 (35.5 overs)
Nimish Lathief 47* (38); Mirza Mohammed Baig 2/46 (10 overs)		Imal Liyanage 56 (81); Abdullah Zaheer 2/32 (4 overs)

Qatar won by 4 wickets
UKM-YSD Cricket Oval, Bangi
Umpires: Akbar Ali (UAE) and Vinod Babu (Oma)
Player of the match: Muhammad Asim (Qat)

- Qatar won the toss and elected to field.

Match 20
8 September 2026
09:30 UTC+8
Scorecard

United Arab Emirates; 192 (48.1 overs)	v	Oman; 143 (34.5 overs)
Tanish Suri 48 (53); Jay Odedra 3/17 (5.1 overs)		Jiten Ramanandi 51 (70); Aayan Afzal Khan 5/34 (8.5 overs)

United Arab Emirates won by 49 runs
UKM-YSD Cricket Oval, Bangi
Umpires: Viswanadan Kalidas (Mas) and Durga Subedi (Nep)
Player of the match: Aayan Afzal Khan (UAE)

- Oman won the toss and elected to field.
- Sanju Sajeev (Oma) and Ibrar Ahmad (UAE) both made their ODI debuts.

== Knockout stage ==
The knockout stage consisted of two semi-finals played on 10 September, a 3rd place play-off, and a final played on 12 September. Nepal qualified for the 2027 Asia Cup.

=== Bracket ===
Semi-finals
A1	Nepal	147 (45.4 overs)
B2	Oman	60 (28.1 overs)
B1	United Arab Emirates	71/3 (11.1 overs)
A2	Hong Kong	70 (30.1 overs)

Final
SF1W	Nepal	313/9 (50 overs)
SF2W	United Arab Emirates	268 (49.2 overs)
3rd place play-off
SF1L	Oman	144 (40.1 overs)
SF2L	Hong Kong	146/1 (19.5 overs)

=== Semi-finals ===
Semi-final 1
10 September 2026
09:30 UTC+8
Scorecard

Nepal; 147 (45.4 overs)	v	Oman; 60 (28.1 overs)
Dipendra Singh Airee 51 (76); Jay Odedra 3/26 (10 overs)		Jatinder Singh 25 (41); Sandeep Lamichhane 3/9 (6 overs)

Nepal won by 87 runs
Bayuemas Oval, Pandamaran
Umpires: Akbar Ali (UAE) and Tabarak Dar (HK)
Player of the match: Dipendra Singh Airee (Nep)

- Oman won the toss and elected to field.
- Sher Malla (Nep) made his ODI debut.

Semi-final 2
10 September 2026
09:30 UTC+8
Scorecard

Hong Kong; 70 (30.1 overs)	v	United Arab Emirates; 71/3 (11.1 overs)
Zeeshan Ali 17 (28); Haider Ali 6/14 (10 overs)		Tanish Suri 27 (25); Kinchit Shah 1/4 (1.1 overs)

United Arab Emirates won by 7 wickets
UKM-YSD Cricket Oval, Bangi
Umpires: Viswanadan Kalidas (Mas) and Durga Subedi (Nep)
Player of the match: Haider Ali (UAE)

- United Arab Emirates won the toss and elected to field.

=== 3rd place play-off ===
3rd place play-off
12 September 2026
09:30 UTC+8
Scorecard

Oman; 144 (40.1 overs)	v	Hong Kong; 146/1 (19.5 overs)
Sanju Sajeev 59 (99); Nasrulla Rana 4/26 (9 overs)		Anshuman Rath 68* (60); Shakeel Ahmed 1/33 (4 overs)

Hong Kong won by 9 wickets
UKM-YSD Cricket Oval, Bangi
Umpires: Shiju Sam (UAE) and Durga Subedi (Nep)
Player of the match: Nasrulla Rana (HK)

- Oman won the toss and elected to bat.

=== Final ===
Final
12 September 2026
09:30 UTC+8
Scorecard

Nepal; 313/9 (50 overs)	v	United Arab Emirates; 269 (49.1 overs)
Aasif Sheikh 102 (106); Ibrar Ahmad 4/62 (8 overs)		Rahul Chopra 100* (105); Karan KC 3/49 (9 overs)

Nepal won by 44 runs
Bayuemas Oval, Pandamaran
Umpires: Tabarak Dar (HK) and Viswanadan Kalidas (Mas)
Player of the match: Aasif Sheikh (Nep)

- Nepal won the toss and elected to bat.
- Muhammad Mohsin (UAE) made his ODI debut.

== Malaysia v United Arab Emirates T20I series ==
United Arab Emirates cricket team in Malaysia in 2026
	Malaysia	United Arab Emirates
- Dates: 14 – 17 September 2026
Captains	Syed Aziz	Harpreet Singh

Twenty20 International series
- Results: United Arab Emirates won the 3-match series 3–0
Most runs	Syed Aziz (150)	Adeeb Usmani (183)
Most wickets	Virandeep Singh (4)	Khuzaima Tanveer (7)

After the tournament, the United Arab Emirates and Malaysia contested a three-match T20I series at the Bayuemas Oval. The United Arab Emirates won all three matches in the series.

The following squads were announced for the series:

- Malaysia: Muhammad Haziq Aiman (wk), Muhammad Akram, Muhammad Amir, Syed Aziz (c, wk), Rizwan Haider, Aslam Khan, Prashant Madhukar, Sharvin Muniandy, Nazmus Sakib (wk), Pavandeep Singh, Virandeep Singh (wk), Vijay Unni, Muhammad Wafiq, Aqeel Wahid, Muhammad Amaluz Zaman
- United Arab Emirates: Ibrar Ahmad, Haider Ali, Rahul Chopra, Muhammad Jawadullah, Aayan Afzal Khan, Sohaib Khan, Muhammad Mohsin, Akshdeep Nath, Muhammad Shahdad, Aryansh Sharma (wk), Harpreet Singh (c), Khuzaima Tanveer, Tanish Suri (wk), Adeeb Usmani (wk)

1st T20I
14 September 2026
10:00 UTC+8
Scorecard

Malaysia; 144/6 (20 overs)	v	United Arab Emirates; 150/4 (16.5 overs)
Virandeep Singh 32 (30); Aayan Afzal Khan 3/18 (4 overs)		Khuzaima Tanveer 68* (29); Prashant Madhukar 2/19 (4 overs)

United Arab Emirates won by 6 wickets
Bayuemas Oval, Pandamaran
Umpires: Akbar Ali (UAE) and Narayanan Sivan (Mas)
Player of the match: Khuzaima Tanveer (UAE)

- Malaysia won the toss and elected to bat.
- Ibrar Ahmad and Muhammad Mohsin (UAE) both made their T20I debuts.

2nd T20I
16 September 2026
10:00 UTC+8
Scorecard

Malaysia; 156/9 (20 overs)	v	United Arab Emirates; 157/3 (17.4 overs)
Syed Aziz 65 (49); Ibrar Ahmad 4/13 (4 overs)		Adeeb Usmani 75* (45); Virandeep Singh 2/33 (4 overs)

United Arab Emirates won by 7 wickets
Bayuemas Oval, Pandamaran
Umpires: Albar Ali (UAE) and Rudy Ismandy (Mas)
Player of the match: Adeeb Usmani (UAE)

- Malaysia won the toss and elected to bat.

3rd T20I
17 September 2026
10:00 UTC+8
Scorecard

United Arab Emirates; 216/3 (20 overs)	v	Malaysia; 157/5 (20 overs)
Adeeb Usmani 96* (53); Azri Azhar 1/36 (4 overs)		Virandeep Singh 73* (52); Khuzaima Tanveer 3/29 (4 overs)

United Arab Emirates won by 59 runs
Bayuemas Oval, Pandamaran
Umpires: Akbar Ali (UAE) and Narayan Sivan (Mas)
Player of the match: Adeeb Usmani (UAE)

- Malaysia won the toss and elected to field.

== See also ==
- International cricket in 2026
- Associate international cricket in 2026
- 2026 ACC Women's Premier Cup
