= Kunjiraman Ramadas =

Malaysian cricketer

Personal information
- Born: 13 May 1970 (age 56); Johor, Malaysia
- Batting: Right-handed
- Role: Wicket-keeper

Career statistics
Competition	List A	ICC Trophy
Matches	7	17
Runs scored	74	104
Batting average	10.57	7.42
100s/50s	0/0	0/0
Top score	20	23
Catches/stumpings	2/1	19/4
- Source: CricketArchive, 18 January 2008

Kunjiraman Ramadas (born 13 May 1970) is a former Malaysian cricketer. A right-handed batsman and wicket-keeper, he played for the Malaysia national cricket team between 1990 and 2001.

== Biography ==
Born in Johor in 1970, Kunjiraman Ramadas first represented Malaysia at Under-19 level, playing in the Youth Asia Cup in Bangladesh in 1989. He first played for the senior side in the 1990 ICC Trophy in the Netherlands. After playing in that year's Saudara Cup match against Singapore, it would be almost three years before he returned to international cricket.

He returned to the international scene for the Saudara Cup match in September 1993, before playing in the 1994 ICC Trophy in Nairobi. He played in the Saudara Cup match again in 1994, and played in the Stan Nagaiah Trophy series for the first time in 1995. He would play in both these annual events against Singapore every year until 1998.

The 1997 ICC Trophy in Kuala Lumpur was his last ICC Trophy tournament, though he continued to play for Malaysia for a further four years. He made his List A debut in March 1998, playing for Malaysia in four matches of the Wills Cup, a Pakistani domestic one-day competition. In September he represented Malaysia in the cricket tournament at the 1998 Commonwealth Games, hosted in Kuala Lumpur.

He played in the ACC Trophy in Nepal in 1998, and in the United Arab Emirates in 2000. He played one Stan Nagaiah Trophy match in 2000, also playing in the Saudara Cup matches of 1999, 2000 and 2001. The 2001 match in Kuala Lumpur was his last for Malaysia.
