= Cricket Federation of Uzbekistan =

Governing body for cricket in Uzbekistan

- Sport: Cricket
- Membership: Associate Member (ICC)
- Abbreviation: CFU
- Founded: 2019
- Affiliation: International Cricket Council (ICC)
- Affiliation date: 2022
- Regional affiliation: Asian Cricket Council
- Affiliation date: 2025
- Headquarters: Tashkent, Uzbekistan
- Location: Tashkent city, Uzbekistan
- President: Aziz G. Mihliev

Official website
- cfu.uz
- (Uzbekistan)

Cricket Federation of Uzbekistan (CFU) is the governing body for cricket in Uzbekistan. The Cricket Federation of Uzbekistan was registered on 29 November 2019, by the Ministry of Justice of Uzbekistan. The founder of the Cricket Federation of Uzbekistan is Aziz Gaybullaevich Mihliev, who currently acts as its President. The formation of the Cricket Federation indicates that Uzbekistan is the second country in Central Asia where cricket was founded.

On July 24, 2025, the Cricket Federation of Uzbekistan joined the Asian Cricket Council (ACC).

== History ==
The "ANFA-Tashkent T20" tournament which took place on 1, 2, 3 November 2020 among local cricket teams became a historical event in the sport of cricket in Uzbekistan. The competition was held together with the leadership of the National Olympic Committee, representatives of the Ministry of Physical Culture and Sports and the Cricket Federation of Uzbekistan. Several media outlets also reported on the event.

In March 2021, Uzbekistan announced for the launch of a T20 cricket league that would be played in August, 2021.

In 2022, Uzbekistan created its first women's cricket team.

== Administration ==
President of CFU:

- Aziz G. Mihliev

Chief Executive Officer (CEO):

- Ibodullaev Fazliddin

Current Head Coaches:

- Men's national team: Ghulam Murtaza Chughtai
- Junior Team's: Vacant
- Director of Disabled Cricket Department: Murodov Jakhongir

Marketing Manager:

- Abdurahim Ergashev

== See also ==
- Uzbekistan national cricket team
