= Simon Willis =

English cricketer (born 1974)

Personal information
- Full name: Simon Charles Willis
- Born: 19 March 1974 (age 52); Greenwich, Greater London
- Batting: Right-handed
- Role: Wicket-keeper

Domestic team information
- Years: Team
- 1993–1999: Kent

Career statistics
Competition	First-class	List A
Matches	16	14
Runs scored	506	119
Batting average	33.73	17.00
100s/50s	0/5	0/0
Top score	82	31*
Catches/stumpings	37/3	15/1
- Source: CricketArchive, 12 July 2008

Simon Charles Willis (born 19 March 1974) is an English former professional cricketer. A wicket-keeper, he enjoyed a seven-year career with Kent County Cricket Club, before moving into a variety of coaching roles at the club.

Willis was appointed head coach of the Hong Kong national cricket team in March 2023.
