= Uzbekistan national cricket team =

Men's Cricket Team representing Uzbekistan

Uzbekistan
- Association: Cricket Federation of Uzbekistan

Personnel
- Captain: Asadbek Musaev
- Coach: Gulam Murtaza

International Cricket Council
- ICC status: Associate member (2022)
- ICC region: Asia

International cricket
- First international: v Cambodia at Singapore National Cricket Ground, Singapore; 12 June 2026

T20 Internationals
- First T20I: v Singapore at Singapore National Cricket Ground, Singapore; 22 June 2026
- Last T20I: v Indonesia at Singapore National Cricket Ground, Singapore; 26 June 2026
T20Is	Played	Won/Lost
Total	4	0/4 (0 ties, 0 no results)
This year	4	0/4 (0 ties, 0 no results)
T20I kit
- As of 26 June 2026

The Uzbekistan national cricket team represents Uzbekistan in international cricket and is administered by Cricket Federation of Uzbekistan. In July 2022, the International Cricket Council (ICC) inducted the team as an Associate Member, becoming the 25th ICC member in the Asia region.

In April 2018, the ICC decided to grant full Twenty20 International (T20I) status to all its members. Therefore, all Twenty20 matches played between Uzbekistan and other ICC members after 1 January 2019 have the full T20I status.

== History ==
Before being officially inaugurated in November 2019 as Cricket Federation of Uzbekistan, cricket has been played in the country since 1997. The first ever registered matches were organized by The British Embassy in Uzbekistan among the embassies of cricket-playing nations. Later, Indian and other residents of cricketing countries began organising regular intra-organisational cricket games. In 1999, a cricket event took place when British Embassy Team played against a crew of players from India, Pakistan, Bangladesh and Malaysia. Presently there are more than 2000 players from various country districts, learning the game's techniques.

=== 2021 ===
In March 2021, the Cricket Federation of Uzbekistan announced the launch of Uzbekistan Premier League that would be played in August, but due to the COVID-19 pandemic, the league had to be postponed.

In July 2021, Uzbekistan started the construction of its first official cricket stadium in Tashkent.

=== Associate membership (2022–present) ===
On 26 July 2022, Uzbekistan became an Associate member of the ICC along with Cambodia and Ivory Coast.

They made their international debut in the 2026 ACC Men's Challenger Cup, winning their first match against Cambodia via walkover and losing their second match to Indonesia by 321 runs. Despite the loss, they progressed to the quarter-finals, where they were defeated by Malaysia by 9 wickets, finishing 8th in the tournament.

13 June 2026
09:30
Scorecard

Indonesia; 387/6 (50 overs)	v	Uzbekistan; 66/9 (18.2 overs)
Sudhakar Jegannathan 204* (138); Azizjon Khasanov 4/59 (10 overs)		Shermukammad 28 (23); Gede Arta 3/0 (1.2 overs)

Indonesia won by 321 runs
Singapore National Cricket Ground, Singapore
Player of the match: Sudhakar Jegannathan (Idn)

- Indonesia won the toss and elected to bat.

== Tournament history ==
=== ACC Men's Challenger Cup ===
- 2026: 8th

== Records and statistics ==
International Match Summary — Uzbekistan

Last updated 26 June 2026

Playing Record
Format	M	W	L	T	NR	Inaugural Match
Twenty20 Internationals	4	0	4	0	0	22 June 2026

=== Twenty20 International ===
T20I record versus other nations

Records complete to T20I #3990. Last updated 26 June 2026.

Opponent	M	W	L	T	NR	First match	First win
vs Associate Members
Indonesia	2	0	2	0	0	23 June 2026	
Singapore	1	0	1	0	0	22 June 2026	
Thailand	1	0	1	0	0	25 June 2026	

== Current squad ==
Updated as of 13 June 2026

This lists all the players who are playing for Uzbekistan in the 2026 ACC Men's Challenger Cup.

- Shermukhammad Shermatov (c)
- Asadbek Musaev
- Golib Tuychiev (wk)
- Nikhil
- Kamron Xolmuradov
- Javohir Mustafoev
- Saif Ullah
- Luqman Hussain
- Oybek Qudratov
- Syed Ahzamul Haq
- Azizjon Khasanov
- Amirxon Khakimov
- Zain Amir
- Ulugbek Tuychiev

== Grounds ==
Location of international cricket grounds in Uzbekistan

== Head coaches ==
Position	Name
Head coach	(Cambodia) Gulam Murtaza
