= Ramesh Menon =

Academic background
- Education: University of Poona (B.J., Bachelor of Journalism); Banaras Hindu University (development journalism); Nowrosjee Wadia College (B.A., English literature)

Academic work
- Discipline: Journalism, documentary film making, corporate training in soft skills and as an adjunct professor, symbiosis institute of media and communication
- Awards: Ramnath Goenka Award; Madhavankutty Gold Medal

Ramesh Menon is an author, journalist, documentary filmmaker, and corporate trainer. He was one of the people to win the Ramnath Goenka Award for Excellence in Journalism in 2005, as well as the Madhavankutty Gold Medal for Excellence English Journalism.

== Career ==
In a career spread over four decades, Menon worked across print, television and the news media. He started as a reporter with The Times of India. His longest stint of 16 years was with India Today where he started as a correspondent and rose to become Associate Editor. As Executive Producer of Business India Television and TV Today, he produced a variety of television programmes dealing with news, current affairs and ecology. He produced Newstrack, a weekly current affairs programme for TV Today. As Roving Editor of rediff.com, he reported on various current events.

He has freelanced for newspapers, magazines, and websites and writes on development issues for, Reader's Digest, Prevention and many other publications. He once worked in Folkestone for the Kent Messenger, a weekly newspaper. He wrote over 175 columns for DNA that dealt with feel-good stories and positive thinking. His last full-time assignment was as Managing Editor of India Legal, India’s first politico-legal weekly magazine.

He is the author of multiple books. Some of them were Modi Demystified-The Making of a Prime Minister (Harper Collins), Whatever the Odds (Harper Collins) (On the making of DLF), Night Sparkle ( a coffee table book on Lighthouses of India) published by the Ministry of Shipping, Carbon Footprint published by TERI, Living with Gratitude published by Orient.

He has directed and scripted numerous documentary films dealing with social issues and environment that have been showcased on television and at various film festivals. One of them is The Slow Poisoning of India. It deals with pesticide contamination affecting food.

He teaches creative writing at various communication schools. He is an adjunct professor at the Symbiosis Institute of Media and Communication at Pune. He is the Course Director of the Creative Writing Course at Sri Aurobindo Centre for Arts and Communication in Delhi. He also lectures at MCRC in Jamia Millia Islamia. The India Today Media Institute, Noida, and the Symbiosis Law College, Noida.

He enjoys teaching, writing, travelling and corporate training in soft skills.
