= Andrew Scott (cricketer) =

Australian cricketer

Personal information
- Full name: Andrew William Scott
- Born: 13 February 1960; Geelong, Victoria, Australia
- Died: 3 September 2006 (aged 46); Corio, Victoria, Australia
- Batting: Right-handed
- Bowling: Right-arm fast-medium

Domestic team information
- Years: Team
- 1985: Durham

Career statistics
Competition	List A
Matches	2
Runs scored	7
Batting average	7.00
100s/50s	–/–
Top score	7
Balls bowled	108
Wickets	2
Bowling average	37.00
5 wickets in innings	–
10 wickets in match	–
Best bowling	2/45
Catches/stumpings	–/–
- Source: Cricinfo, 7 August 2011

Andrew William Scott (13 February 1960 – 3 September 2006) was an Australian cricketer. Scott was a right-handed batsman who bowled right-arm fast-medium. He was born in Geelong, Victoria.

Scott made his debut for Durham against Hertfordshire in the 1985 Minor Counties Championship. He played Minor counties cricket for Durham only in the 1985 season, making 6 Minor Counties Championship appearances and 4 MCCA Knockout Trophy appearances. He made his List A debut against Derbyshire in the 1985 NatWest Trophy. He bowled 8 wicket-less overs for the cost of 29 runs in this match, while with the bat he wasn't called upon, with Durham winning against their first-class opponents by 7 wickets. He made a further List A appearance against Kent in the following round of the same competition. In this match, he took the wickets of Mark Benson and Alan Knott for the cost of 45 runs from 10 overs, while with the bat he was dismissed for 7 runs by Derek Underwood, with Kent winning by 79 runs.

He died in Corio, Victoria on 3 September 2006.
