= Hong Kong national cricket team =

National cricket team in Hong Kong

Hong Kong
- Logo since 2016
- Association: Cricket Hong Kong, China 香港板球

Personnel
- Captain: Yasim Murtaza
- Coach: Kaushal Silva

Team information
- City: Hong Kong
- Home ground: Mission Road Ground
- Capacity: 3,500

History
- Hong Kong Sixes wins: 0

International Cricket Council
- ICC status: Associate member (1969)
- ICC region: Asia
ICC Rankings	Current	Best-ever
T20I	24th	11th (31 Aug 2015)

One Day Internationals
- First ODI: v Bangladesh at Sinhalese Sports Club Cricket Ground, Colombo; 16 July 2004
- Last ODI: v India at Dubai International Cricket Stadium, Dubai; 18 September 2018
ODIs	Played	Won/Lost
Total	26	9/16 (0 ties, 1 no result)
- World Cup Qualifier appearances: 8 (first in 1982)
- Best result: 3rd (2014)

T20 Internationals
- First T20I: v Nepal at Zohur Ahmed Chowdhury Stadium, Chittagong; 16 March 2014
- Last T20I: v Maldives at UKM-YSD Cricket Oval, Bangi; 12 October 2026
T20Is	Played	Won/Lost
Total	140	66/68 (2 ties, 4 no results)
This year	19	12/6 (0 ties, 1 no result)
- T20 World Cup appearances: 2 (first in 2014)
- Best result: Group stage (2014, 2016)
- T20 World Cup Qualifier appearances: 6 (Note: For the 2024 and 2026 Men's T20 World Cups, the final round of qualification in Asia was the ICC Asia Regional Final.) (first in 2012)
- Best result: 4th (2015)
List A & and T20I kit
- As of 12 October 2026

The Hong Kong men's cricket team, officially Hong Kong, China, represents Hong Kong in international cricket competitions. It played its first match in 1866 and has been an associate member of the International Cricket Council (ICC) since 1969.

Hong Kong played its first One Day Internationals in the 2004 Asia Cup, and in January 2014 was granted ODI status until 2018, as a result of finishing third in the 2014 Cricket World Cup Qualifier. The team gained Twenty20 International status in November 2013, as a result of qualifying for the 2014 ICC World Twenty20. Hong Kong lost their ODI status in March 2018 after losing to the Netherlands in a play-off match during the 2018 Cricket World Cup Qualifier. They did, however, play two further ODI matches at the 2018 Asia Cup in September 2018 after winning the 2018 Asia Cup Qualifier, as the ICC announced that all matches played at the finals would have ODI status.

Hong Kong has played in every ICC Trophy/World Cup Qualifier tournament, with the exceptions of the 1979 and 2005 editions. It has also taken part in two ICC Intercontinental Cup tournaments, in 2005 and in 2015–17, and in two ICC T20 World Cup tournaments, in 2014 and 2016.

In April 2018, the ICC decided to grant full Twenty20 International (T20I) status to all its members. Therefore, all Twenty20 matches played between Hong Kong and other ICC members after 1 January 2019 have the full T20I status.

== History ==
=== Early years ===
The sport was introduced to Hong Kong by the British, with the first recorded game taking place in 1841, and the Hong Kong Cricket Club being founded ten years later. The Cricket Club (playing as Hong Kong) played a number of Interport matches against sides in mainland China, the first taking place against Shanghai in 1866, and in 1890 played Ceylon (now Sri Lanka) for the first time.

1892 saw disaster when the SS Bokhara, which was carrying the team back from Shanghai, sank in a typhoon with the loss of 125 lives. There were only 23 survivors, which included only 2 of the 13 team members. The other 11 members of the team were lost, including Surrey cricketer John Dunn.

1948 saw the last game against Shanghai.Jack Chegwyn led the first international team to Hong Kong in 1952, and the first tour by an MCC team was in 1966. The MCC, captained by Mike Smith played one match against the national side, winning by 74 runs. In 1969 the Hong Kong Cricket Association became an associate member of the International Cricket Council, cricket's global ruling body.

=== ICC membership ===
The year after gaining ICC membership, the Hong Kong national side played against an MCC side captained by Tony Lewis, drawing the game, but it was not until the 1982 ICC Trophy when the Hong Kong team next played. At that tournament the Hong Kong team, which featured future England Test cricketer Dermot Reeve, failed to progress beyond the first round.

Hong Kong took part in the following three ICC Trophy tournaments, again failing to progress beyond the first round in 1986, reaching the plate competition in 1990 and the second round in 1994. They then played in the inaugural ACC Trophy tournament in 1996, failing to progress beyond the group stage after losing to Bangladesh and Fiji.

In 1997, Hong Kong returned to Chinese control. In the same year, the national team finished eighth in the ICC Trophy. They played in the ACC Trophy again in 1998, losing to Malaysia in the semi-finals.

=== 21st century ===
==== 2000–2009 ====
In 2000, Hong Kong reached the final of the ACC Trophy, where they lost to the United Arab Emirates. Nonetheless, this earned them qualification for the 2002 Asia Cup (which was subsequently moved to 2004), and thus their first taste of One Day International cricket.

Hong Kong fared poorly in the 2001 ICC Trophy, going out in the group stage having achieved only one win, against Papua New Guinea. In 2002, they reached the semi-finals of the ACC Trophy, again losing to the United Arab Emirates.

At the 2004 Asia Cup, held in Sri Lanka, Hong Kong were drawn alongside Test nations Bangladesh and Pakistan. They lost both matches heavily, despite restricting Bangladesh to 221/9 in the first match.

Also in 2004, Hong Kong failed to progress beyond the first round of the ACC Trophy after losing in the group stages to Oman and Bahrain, missing out on qualification for the 2005 ICC Trophy in Ireland. They also reached the final of the ACC Fast Track Countries Tournament, losing to the United Arab Emirates. Hong Kong played in the Intercontinental Cup for the first time in 2005. They lost to the UAE and drew with Nepal, failing to reach the semi-finals. They finished last in the fast-track nations tournament the same year.

In 2006, Hong Kong again lost to the United Arab Emirates in the final of the ACC Trophy, and finished fourth in the ACC Premier League. The following year, they travelled to Darwin, Australia to take part in Division Three of the World Cricket League, finishing fifth, relegating them to Division Four for 2008.

In October/November 2007, Hong Kong took part in the inaugural ACC Twenty20 Cup held in Kuwait, where they played in Group B against the United Arab Emirates, Singapore, Kuwait and Saudi Arabia. Hong Kong finished 4th in their group and failed to make to the semi-finals stage.

In June 2008, Hong Kong took part in the Asia Cup in Pakistan. They failed to progress beyond the group stage to the Super Four stage, as they lost both of their group A matches against India and Pakistan convincingly.

In October 2008, Hong Kong travelled to Dar-es-Salaam, Tanzania to participate in Division Four of the World Cricket League. Hong Kong won four group matches against; Fiji, Italy, Jersey and the hosts but lost twice to Afghanistan in their group match and the Final. Hong Kong's top two finish resulted in their promotion back to Division Three.

==== 2010–present ====
In 2011 they hosted the Division Three and won it defeating Papua New Guinea in the finals to qualify for Division Two to be held in the United Arab Emirates. Then in Division Two they came 4th qualifying as HPP member and for 2014 Cricket World Cup Qualifier in New Zealand. .

In 2013 the UAE hosted the ICC T20 Qualifier where Hong Kong came 6th by beating Papua New Guinea and just enough to qualify for ICC T20 World Cup 2014 held in Bangladesh.

In 2014, New Zealand hosted the ICC 50 over world cup qualifier where Hong Kong came third place despite not qualifying for 2015 ICC cricket world cup, they still achieved an ODI status with Papua New Guinea.

In March 2014 Hong Kong beat the host Bangladesh in the 2014 ICC World Twenty20 by two wickets with two balls remaining but could not make it to the next stage of super 10 having lost the two earlier matches to Afghanistan and Nepal

Hong Kong first ODI win against a full member came on 8 March 2018 defeating Afghanistan in 2018 Cricket World Cup Qualifier.

8 March 2018
09:30
Scorecard

Hong Kong; 241/8 (50 overs)	v	Afghanistan; 195/9 (46 overs)
Anshuman Rath 65 (90); Mujeeb Ur Rahman 3/26 (10 overs)		Dawlat Zadran 40* (30); Ehsan Khan 4/33 (9 overs)

Hong Kong won by 30 runs (D/L method)
Bulawayo Athletic Club, Bulawayo
Umpires: Gregory Brathwaite (WI) and Paul Wilson (Aus)
Player of the match: Ehsan Khan (HK)

- Afghanistan won the toss and elected to field.
- Afghanistan were set a revised target of 226 runs from 46 overs due to rain.
- This was Hong Kong's first win against a Full Member side in ODIs.

== Grounds ==
The Mission Road Ground is the only international ground in Hong Kong.

== Tournament history ==
Legend

- Champions
- Runners-up
- Third place/Semi-finals
- Hosts
- Q Qualified/Advanced to next stage
- DNQ Did not qualify
- ▲ Promoted
- Remained in the same division
- ▼ Relegated

=== Cricket World Cup ===
Cricket World Cup record								Qualification record				
Year	Round	Position	Pld	W	L	T	NR	Pld	W	L	T	NR
(England) 1975	Not invited							No qualifiers held				
(England) 1979	Did not enter							Did not enter				
(England) (Wales) 1983	Did not qualify							7	2	3	0	2
(India) (Pakistan) 1987	Did not qualify							8	3	5	0	0
(Australia) (New Zealand) 1992	Did not qualify							8	5	3	0	0
(India) (Pakistan) (Sri Lanka) 1996	Did not qualify							7	3	4	0	0
(England) (Wales) (Scotland) (Republic of Ireland) (Netherlands) 1999	Did not qualify							7	3	3	0	1
(South Africa) (Zimbabwe) (Kenya) 2003	Did not qualify							5	1	4	0	0
(Cricket West Indies) 2007	Did not qualify							3	1	2	0	0
(India) (Sri Lanka) (Bangladesh) 2011	Did not qualify							16	8	8	0	0
(Australia) (New Zealand) 2015	Did not qualify							21	11	10	0	0
(England) (Wales) 2019	Did not qualify							20	9	9	0	2
(India) 2023	Did not qualify							15	9	5	0	1
(South Africa) (Namibia) (Zimbabwe) 2027	Did not qualify							15	9	4	0	2
Total	—N/a	0/14	–	–	–	–	–	132	64	60	0	8

=== Cricket World Cup Qualifier ===
Cricket World Cup Qualifier record
Year	Round	Position	Pld	W	L	T	NR	Qual.
(England) 1979	Did not participate							
(England) 1982	Group stage	8/16	7	2	3	0	2	DNQ
(England) 1986	Group stage	8/16	8	3	5	0	0	DNQ
(Netherlands) 1990	Plate round	11/17	8	5	3	0	0	DNQ
(Kenya) 1994	Second round	8/20	7	3	4	0	0	DNQ
(Malaysia) 1997	Second round	8/22	7	3	3	0	1	DNQ
(Canada) 2001	Group stage	9/24	5	1	4	0	0	DNQ
(Ireland) 2005	Did not qualify							
(South Africa) 2009	Did not qualify							
(New Zealand) 2014	Super Sixes	3/10	9	6	3	0	0	DNQ
(Zimbabwe) 2018	Playoffs	10/10	6	1	5	0	0	DNQ
(Zimbabwe) 2023	Did not qualify							
(To be determined) 2027	Did not qualify							
Total	0 Titles	8/13	57	24	30	0	3	—N/a

=== CWC Challenge League ===
Cricket World Cup Challenge League record
Year	League	Position	Pld	W	L	T	NR	P/R
2019–2022	B	3/6	15	9	5	0	1	Same position
2024–2026	B	3/6	15	9	4	0	2	Same position
Total	0 Titles	2/2	30	18	9	0	3	—N/a

=== Men's T20 World Cup ===
Men's T20 World Cup record								Qualification record				
Year	Round	Position	Pld	W	L	T	NR	Pld	W	L	T	NR
(South Africa) 2007	Not eligible							Not eligible				
(England) 2009	Not eligible							Not eligible				
(Cricket West Indies) 2010	Not eligible							Not eligible				
(Sri Lanka) 2012	Did not qualify							15	8	7	0	0
(Bangladesh) 2014	First stage	15/16	3	1	2	0	0	14	9	5	0	0
(India) 2016	First stage	16/16	3	0	3	0	0	8	4	3	0	1
(United Arab Emirates) (Oman) 2021	Did not qualify							7	3	4	0	0
(Australia) 2022	Did not qualify							5	2	3	0	0
(United States) (Cricket West Indies) 2024	Did not qualify							3	1	2	0	0
(India) (Sri Lanka) 2026	Did not qualify							6	4	1	0	1
(Australia) (New Zealand) 2028	To be determined							5	3	1	0	1
Total	0 Titles	2/10	6	1	5	0	0	63	34	26	0	3

=== T20 World Cup Global Qualifier ===
Men's T20 World Cup Global Qualifier record
Year	Round	Position	Pld	W	L	T	NR	Qual.
(Ireland) 2008	Not eligible							
(United Arab Emirates) 2010	Not eligible							
(United Arab Emirates) 2012	Play-offs	11/16	9	4	5	0	0	DNQ
(United Arab Emirates) 2013	Quarter-finals	6/16	10	7	3	0	0	Q
(Ireland) (Scotland) 2015	Semi-finals	4/16	9	4	3	0	2	Q
(United Arab Emirates) 2019	Play-offs	8/14	7	3	4	0	0	DNQ
(Zimbabwe) 2022	Play-offs	6/8	5	2	3	0	0	DNQ
(To be determined) 2028	To be determined							
Total	0 Titles	5/8	40	20	18	0	2	—N/a

=== T20 World Cup Asia Regional Final ===
T20 World Cup Asia Regional Final record
Year	Round	Position	Pld	W	L	T	NR	Qual.
(Singapore) 2019	Received a bye							
(Nepal) 2023	Round-robin	6/8	3	1	2	0	0	DNQ
(Oman) 2025	Did not qualify							
(To be determined) 2027	Qualified							
Total	0 Titles	2/4	3	1	2	0	0	—N/a

=== Asia Cup ===
Asia Cup record
Year	Round	Position	Pld	W	L	T	NR
(United Arab Emirates) 1984	No qualification						
(Sri Lanka) 1986	Did not qualify						
(Bangladesh) 1988	No qualification						
(India) 1991	No qualification						
(United Arab Emirates) 1995	No qualification						
(Sri Lanka) 1997	No qualification						
(Bangladesh) 2000	No qualification						
(Sri Lanka) 2004	Group stage	6/6	2	0	2	0	0
(Pakistan) 2008	Group stage	6/6	2	0	2	0	0
(Sri Lanka) 2010	No qualification						
(Bangladesh) 2012	No qualification						
(Bangladesh) 2014	No qualification						
(Bangladesh) 2016	Did not qualify						
(United Arab Emirates) 2018	Group stage	5/6	2	0	2	0	0
(United Arab Emirates) 2022	Group stage	6/6	2	0	2	0	0
(Pakistan) (Sri Lanka) 2023	Did not qualify						
(United Arab Emirates) 2025	Group stage	7/8	3	0	3	0	0
(Bangladesh) 2027	Did not qualify						
Total	0 Titles	5/18	11	0	11	0	0

=== Asian Games ===
Asian Games record
Year	Round	Position	Pld	W	L	T	NR
(China) 2010	Quarter-finals	5/9	3	2	1	0	0
(South Korea) 2014	Fourth place	4/10	3	1	2	0	0
(China) 2022	Quarter-finals	5/12	3	2	1	0	0
(Japan) 2026	Quarter-finals	8/10	3	1	1	0	1
Total	0 Titles	4/4	12	6	5	0	1

=== Other international tournaments ===
ICC Intercontinental Cup (FC)	World Cricket League (LA/ODI/50 overs)
2005: 11th place; 2015–17: 4th place	2007 (Division Three) : 5th place (▼); 2008 (Division Four) : Runners-up (▲); 2009 (Division Three) : 3rd place; 2011 (Division Three) : Winners (▲); 2011 (Division Two) : 4th place; 2019 (Division Two) : 6th place

=== Other regional tournaments ===
T20WC Asia Sub-regional Qualifiers (T20I)	ACC Premier Cup/ Asia Cup Qualifier (OD/T20I)	ACC Twenty20 Cup (T20)	ACC Trophy (OD)
2024: 3rd place (DNQ); 2026: Runners-up (Q)	2016 : 4th place (DNQ); 2018 : Winners (Q); 2022 : Winners (Q); 2023 : 5th place (DNQ); 2024 : 3rd place (Q); 2026 : 3rd place (DNQ)	2007: First round; 2009: 10th place; 2011: Runners up; 2013: 4th place	1996: First round; 1998: Semi-finals; 2000: Runners up; 2002: Semi-finals; 2004: First round; 2006: Runners up; 2008 (Elite): Winners; 2010 (Elite): 3rd place; 2012 (Elite): 5th place
ACC Eastern Region T20 (T20)	ACC Premier League (OD)	Fast Track Countries Tournament	
2020: Runners-up	2014: 5th place	2004/05: Runners-up; 2005/06: 5th place; 2006/07: 4th place	

== Current squad ==
This lists all the players who have played for Hong Kong in the past 12 months or has been part of the latest One-day or T20I squad.

Updated as of 8 August 2026.

Name	Age	Batting style	Bowling style	Forms	Notes
Batters
Nizakat Khan	34	Right-handed	Right-arm leg break	One-day & T20I	
Babar Hayat	34	Right-handed	Right-arm medium	One-day & T20I	Vice-captain
Anshuman Rath	29	Left-handed	Slow left-arm orthodox	One-day & T20I	
Martin Coetzee	38	Right-handed	Right-arm medium	One-day & T20I	
Kalhan Challu	23	Right-handed	Right-arm off break	T20I	
Anas Khan	33	Left-handed	Slow left-arm orthodox	T20I	
All-rounders
Yasim Murtaza	35	Left-handed	Slow left-arm orthodox	One-day & T20I	Captain
Aizaz Khan	33	Right-handed	Right-arm medium	One-day & T20I	
Hafeez Khan	22	Right-handed	Right-arm off break	One-day	
Kinchit Shah	30	Left-handed	Right-arm off break	T20I	
Wicket-keepers
Zeeshan Ali	37	Right-handed	—N/a	One-day & T20I	
Shiv Mathur	18	Right-handed	Right-arm medium	One-day & T20I	
Shahid Wasif	29	Right-handed	Right-arm off break	One-day & T20I	
Spin Bowlers
Ehsan Khan	41	Right-handed	Right-arm off break	One-day & T20I	
Mohammad Ghazanfar	31	Right-handed	Right-arm leg break	T20I	
Pace Bowlers
Ayush Shukla	24	Right-handed	Right-arm medium	One-day & T20I	
Nasrulla Rana	24	Right-handed	Right-arm medium	One-day & T20I	
Hassan Khan Mohammad	26	Right-handed	Right-arm medium	One-day & T20I	
Mohammad Waheed	23	Right-handed	Right-arm medium	One-day & T20I	
Ateeq Iqbal	34	Right-handed	Right-arm medium-fast	One-day & T20I	

== Coaching staff ==
Role	Name
Head coach	Kaushal Silva
Assistant Coach	Moner Dar
Team Analyst	Chris Pickett
Specialist Coach	Richard das Neves

=== Coaching history ===
- 1993–1994: (England) Dermot Reeve
- 1997: (New Zealand) David Trist
- 2000: (England) Adam Hollioake
- 2001: (England) Andy Moles
- 2001–2002: (Sri Lanka) Lal Jayasinghe
- 2004–2007: (India) Robin Singh
- 2007: (India) Sameer Dighe
- 2007–2009: (England) Aftab Habib
- 2009–2010: (Hong Kong) Afzaal Haider
- 2010–2015: (Australia) Charlie Burke
- 2015–2019: (England) Simon Cook
- 2019–2022: (Ireland) Trent Johnston
- 2023–2025: (England) Simon Willis
- 2025–present: (Sri Lanka) Kaushal Silva

== Records ==
International Match Summary – Hong Kong

Last updated 12 October 2026.

Playing Record
Format	M	W	L	T	NR	Inaugural Match
One Day Internationals	26	9	16	0	1	16 July 2004
Twenty20 Internationals	140	66	68	2	4	16 March 2014

=== One Day Internationals ===
- Highest team total: 323/4 v Papua New Guinea, 8 December 2017 at ICC Academy Ground, Dubai
- Highest individual score: 143*, Anshuman Rath v Papua New Guinea, 8 December 2017 at ICC Academy Ground, Dubai
- Best individual bowling figures: 4/10, Kinchit Shah v Papua New Guinea, 17 March 2018 at Harare Sports Club, Harare

Most ODI runs for Hong Kong

Player	Runs	Average	Career span
Anshuman Rath	828	51.75	2014–2018
Babar Hayat	784	39.20	2014–2018
Nizakat Khan	675	33.75	2014–2018
Tanwir Afzal	292	18.25	2014–2018
Aizaz Khan	260	20.00	2014–2018

Most ODI wickets for Hong Kong

Player	Wickets	Average	Career span
Nadeem Ahmed	38	24.52	2004–2018
Ehsan Khan	29	20.48	2016–2018
Tanwir Afzal	19	31.63	2014–2018
Ehsan Nawaz	16	28.62	2014–2018
Aizaz Khan	16	42.50	2014–2018

Highest individual innings in ODI

Player	Score	Opposition	Venue	Year
Anshuman Rath	143*	Papua New Guinea	Dubai	2017
Mark Chapman	124*	United Arab Emirates	Dubai	2015
Anshuman Rath	97	Scotland	Mong Kok	2016
Nizakat Khan	94	Scotland	Mong Kok	2016
Nizakat Khan	93	United Arab Emirates	Dubai	2017

Best bowling figures in an innings in ODI

Player	Score	Opposition	Venue	Year
Kinchit Shah	4/10	Papua New Guinea	Harare	2018
Nadeem Ahmed	4/26	Scotland	Mong Kok	2016
Nadeem Ahmed	4/33	Scotland	Harare	2017
Ehsan Khan	4/33	Afghanistan	Bulawayo	2018
Ehsan Nawaz	4/47	Zimbabwe	Bulawayo	2018

ODI record versus other nations

Records complete to ODI #4039. Last updated 18 September 2018.

Opponent	M	W	L	T	NR	First match	First win
vs Test nations
Afghanistan	2	1	1	0	0	1 May 2014	8 March 2018
Bangladesh	1	0	1	0	0	16 July 2004	
India	2	0	2	0	0	25 June 2008	
Pakistan	3	0	3	0	0	18 July 2004	
Zimbabwe	1	0	1	0	0	10 March 2018	
vs Associate Members
Papua New Guinea	8	4	4	0	0	8 November 2014	4 November 2016
Scotland	5	2	2	0	1	26 January 2016	26 January 2016
United Arab Emirates	4	2	2	0	0	4 May 2014	16 November 2015

=== Twenty20 Internationals ===
- Highest team total: 287/7 v. Oman on 5 June 2026 at Singapore National Cricket Ground, Singapore.
- Highest individual score: 140*, Anshuman Rath v. Oman on 5 June 2026 at Singapore National Cricket Ground, Singapore.
- Best individual bowling figures: 6/12, Nasrulla Rana v. Papua New Guinea on 24 September 2023 at Bayuemas Oval, Pandamaran.

Most T20I runs for Hong Kong

Player	Runs	Average	Career span
Babar Hayat	2,756	28.12	2014–2026
Anshuman Rath	2,580	31.85	2015–2026
Nizakat Khan	2,573	21.62	2014–2026
Zeeshan Ali	1,542	27.53	2022–2026
Aizaz Khan	1,115	15.27	2014–2026

Most T20I wickets for Hong Kong

Player	Wickets	Average	Career span
Ehsan Khan	165	15.38	2016–2026
Aizaz Khan	106	21.94	2014–2026
Yasim Murtaza	89	19.85	2022–2026
Ayush Shukla	67	23.71	2022–2026
Nasrulla Rana	62	21.08	2019–2026

T20I record versus other nations

Records complete to T20I #4190. Last updated 12 October 2026.

Opponent	M	W	L	T	NR	First match	First win
vs Test nations
Afghanistan	6	2	4	0	0	18 March 2014	21 July 2015
Bangladesh	2	1	1	0	0	20 March 2014	
India	1	0	1	0	0	31 August 2022	
Ireland	4	2	2	0	0	17 July 2015	
Pakistan	2	0	2	0	0	2 September 2022	
Sri Lanka	1	0	1	0	0	15 September 2025	
Zimbabwe	1	0	1	0	0	8 March 2016	
vs Associate Members
Bahrain	6	2	3	1	0	8 March 2023	
Cambodia	1	1	0	0	0	28 September 2023	
Canada	1	1	0	0	0	24 October 2019	
China	3	3	0	0	0	14 February 2024	
Japan	5	5	0	0	0	1 October 2023	
Jersey	1	1	0	0	0	23 October 2019	
Kuwait	11	5	5	0	1	23 August 2022	
Malaysia	22	10	12	0	0	20 February 2020	6 March 2020
Maldives	2	1	0	0	1	3 September 2024	3 September 2024
Mongolia	1	1	0	0	0	31 August 2024	
Myanmar	1	1	0	0	0	30 August 2024	
Namibia	2	0	2	0	0	19 June 2026	
Nigeria	3	3	0	0	0	27 October 2019	
Nepal	13	5	6	0	2	16 March 2014	24 November 2014
Netherlands	3	1	2	0	0	18 January 2017	
Oman	11	3	8	0	0	21 November 2015	26 November 2015
Papua New Guinea	4	1	3	0	0	14 July 2022	
Qatar	8	5	2	1	0	27 February 2024	
Samoa	2	2	0	0	0	19 July 2025	
Saudi Arabia	2	0	2	0	0	14 April 2024	
Scotland	5	1	4	0	0	25 July 2015	30 January 2016
Singapore	7	6	1	0	0	4 March 2020	15 July 2022
Thailand	1	1	0	0	0	3 March 2020	
Uganda	2	0	2	0	0	11 July 2022	
United Arab Emirates	6	2	4	0	0	21 February 2016	24 August 2022

== International records/World records ==
- Jamie Atkinson was the first player (either male or female) born in the 1990s to play in ODI cricket.
- Ryan Campbell who formerly played for Australia in ODIs, became the oldest player in T20I cricket to make his T20I debut at the age of 44 and 30 days.
- Holds the record for the highest ODI partnership for any wicket by an associate nation (174 for the first wicket between Nizakat Khan and Anshuman Rath v India)
- Hong Kong set the record for taking the longest time duration to lose their first wicket in an ODI match (34.1 overs against India at the 2018 Asia Cup)

== See also ==
- Cricket Hong Kong
- List of Hong Kong ODI cricketers
- List of Hong Kong Twenty20 International cricketers
- Hong Kong national cricket captains
- Hong Kong women's cricket team
