= Chalee Kader =

Thai chef

Chalee Kader (Thai: ชาลี กาเดอร์) is a Thai chef. Chalee is the owner on Wana Yook, 100 Mahaseth, and Soma.

== Early life and education ==
Chalee was born to a Thai Chinese and Indian family. He attended the University of California, Riverside, studying marketing psychology, later attending college in San Francisco. Chalee returned to Thailand after four years in San Francisco, working for a food-import company.

== Career ==
In 2023, Wana Yook was awarded a Michelin Star.

In 2026, Chalee opened Sato Sammosorn in Bangkok's Victory Monument neighborhood, serving over 40 varieties of Thai sato.
