= Aqeel Wahid =

Malaysian cricketer (born 2001)

Personal information
- Born: 23 November 2001 (age 24); Petaling Jaya, Malaysia
- Batting: Left-handed
- Bowling: Right Arm off-break
- Role: Middle order batter

International information
- National side: Malaysia
- T20I debut (cap 33): 16 March 2024 v Papua New Guinea
- Last T20I: 04 May 2026 v Indonesia
- Source: , 07 May 2026

Aqeel Wahid (born 23 November 2001) is a Malaysian cricketer who plays for the Malaysia national cricket team. He made his Twenty20 International (T20I) debut against Papua New Guinea on 16 March 2024. He lives in Perth, Western Australia, and carries Sri Lankan heritage, despite being born and spending his early childhood in Malaysia.

He played in Malaysia's squad for the 2024 ACC Men's Premier Cup which took place at Al Amerat in Muscat, Oman between 12 and 21 April 2024. He finished as the leading run-scorer for Malaysia in the tournament, with 116 runs in just 3 innings and was awarded the player of the match for his unbeaten 65* (46) against Saudi Arabia.

He was also in Malaysia's squad for the 2024 ICC Cricket World Cup Challenge League Play-off tournament, where he made his List A debut on 26 February 2024 for Malaysia against Vanuatu, top-scoring with 44 runs.
