= Rahul Sharma (Hong Kong cricketer) =

Hong Kong cricketer (born 1960)

Personal information
- Born: 14 September 1960 (age 66)
- Batting: Right-handed
- Bowling: Right-arm legspin

International information
- National side: Hong Kong
- ODI debut (cap 9): 16 July 2004 v Bangladesh
- Last ODI: 18 July 2004 v Pakistan

Career statistics
Competition	ODI	First-class
Matches	2	2
Runs scored	11	18
Batting average	5.50	9.00
100s/50s	0/0	0/0
Top score	10	16
Catches/stumpings	1/0	0/0
- Source: Cricinfo, 27 September 2020

Rahul Sharma (born 14 September 1960 in New Delhi) is a former Hong Kong cricketer. A right-handed batsman, he made his ODI debut as captain in the Asia Cup against Bangladesh aged 43. The 10 runs he scored on debut was the third highest individual score for his team. He had previously opened for Delhi in the 1986–87 Ranji Trophy match against Himachal Pradesh. His only other first-class appearance, after an interval exceeding 18 years, was for Hong Kong against Nepal in 2005 in the ICC Inter-Continental Cup.
