= Malaysia national cricket team =

Malaysia
- Nickname(s): Harimau Malaya (Malayan Tigers)
- Association: Malaysian Cricket Association

Personnel
- Captain: Syed Aziz
- Coach: Bilal Asad

International Cricket Council
- ICC status: Associate member (1967)
- ICC region: Asia
ICC Rankings	Current	Best-ever
T20I	25th	24th (14 April 2024)

One Day Internationals
- World Cup Qualifier appearances: 7 (first in 1979)
- Best result: Plate competition, 1990 and 1994

T20 Internationals
- First T20I: v Thailand at Kinrara Oval, Kuala Lumpur; 24 June 2019
- Last T20I: v China at Bayuemas Oval, Pandamaran; 14 October 2026
T20Is	Played	Won/Lost
Total	138	81/52 (1 tie, 4 no results)
This year	20	11/9 (0 ties, 0 no results)
- T20 World Cup Qualifier appearances: 1 (Note: T20 World Cup Qualifier refers to the Regional Final of the ICC Asia region from the 2023 edition.) (first in 2023)
- Best result: Group stage (2023)
T20I kit
- As of 14 October 2026

The Malaysia national cricket team represents Malaysia in international cricket matches. The team is organised by the Malaysian Cricket Association which has been an associate member of the International Cricket Council (ICC) since 1967.

During the British colonial period, the Federated Malay States, Straits Settlements and Malaya cricket teams played regularly in Interport matches and against other visiting teams. Following Malaysian independence, the team's most frequent opponent has been Singapore in the Saudara Cup and Stan Nagaiah Trophy. Malaysia made its debut in ICC tournaments in the inaugural 1979 ICC Trophy, making regular appearances until ICC pathways were altered in the 2000s and hosting the 1997 ICC Trophy. Malaysia has regularly hosted Asian Cricket Council (ACC) tournaments and finished runner-up in the 1998 ACC Trophy. In the World Cricket League the team reached as high as Division Three, subsequently being placed in the ICC Cricket World Cup Challenge League.

== History ==
=== Early days ===
Cricket has been played in what is now Malaysia since the 1880s. Various teams represented Malaya, the Federated Malay States and the Straits Settlements, formed in 1884 by the British. Royal Selangor Club (RSC) is the first cricket club founded in present Malaysia (locally called a padang also in Singapore e.g. Padang, Singapore). The Singapore Cricket Club, a former affiliate of the Malayan Cricket Association, is the oldest cricket club in the region (founded in 1852).

The first recorded match was between Selangor and Malacca in 1887. The Selangor-Singapore series was played in 1891. Cricket in Johor was played in the early 20th century, but the first recorded cricketing event is the visit of the Australian team led by C. G. Macartney in 1927. Penang is another historical cricket venue in Malaysia where cricket has been played from British times. The Penang Sports Club was established in the early 1900s. On 6 June 1927 Malaya beat Australia by 39 runs to make history. Lall Singh became the first Malaysia-born Test player (played for India in their debut Test at Lord's against England in 1932).

After World War II, cricket grew in popularity, leading to the founding of the Malayan Cricket Association (MCA) in 1948. Regional cricket associations like Sabah, Sarawak and Singapore joined and in 1963, the MCA was renamed the Malaysian Cricket Association. In 1965, the independence of Singapore led its association to leave the MCA. In 1967, Malaysia became an associate member of the ICC.

The first team to represent Malaysia was in 1970, three years after the MCA became an ICC associate member, when it played an MCC side captained by Tony Lewis in a two-day match, losing by 230 runs. The same year, Malaysia played the first Saudara Cup match against Singapore, drawing the three-day match.

The Saudara Cup match continued annually, and in 1979 Malaysia participated in the first ICC Trophy, failing to progress beyond the first round, a performance they repeated in 1982 and 1986. They reached the plate competition in 1990 and 1994.

=== 1990s ===
The first Stan Nagaiah Trophy was played in Singapore in February 1995 with Singapore beating Malaysia 2–1 in the three-match one-day series. After winning the Stan Nagaiah Trophy and drawing the Saudara Cup match in 1996 Malaysia hosted the first ACC Trophy tournament, finishing third in their first round group.

Malaysia began to host major international tournaments in 1997, starting with the 1997 ICC Trophy in which Malaysia finished 16th after losing a play-off to Namibia. They played one season in Pakistani domestic cricket in 1998, losing all four of their preliminary round matches. Cricket made its first and, to date, only appearance in the Commonwealth Games later that year, with Malaysia hosting that year's games. The cricket tournament saw Malaysia participate as hosts though they lost all three of their first round matches. They reached the final of the ACC Trophy that same year, losing to Bangladesh.

=== 21st century ===
==== 2000–2017 ====
In 2000, Malaysia reached the semi-final of the ACC Trophy before losing to hosts the UAE. They failed to progress beyond the first round of the 2001 ICC Trophy and lost to Nepal in the semi-finals of the 2002 ACC Trophy.

Malaysia played their first first-class matches in 2004 as part of that year's ICC Intercontinental Cup. They lost to both Nepal and the UAE and failed to reach the semi-final stage of the tournament. Malaysia hosted the ACC Trophy in 2004, which was the first stage of qualification for the 2005 ICC Trophy and the 2007 World Cup, finishing joint seventh with Bhutan. They finished last in the ACC Fast Track Countries Tournament in 2004, thus failing to qualify for the 2005 ICC Intercontinental Cup. They played in the tournament again in 2005, this time finishing third.

In 2006, Malaysia competed in the ACC Premier League, finishing fourth. They again hosted the ACC Trophy that year, again finishing seventh after beating Qatar in a play-off.

Malaysia have played in the ACC Twenty20 Cup thrice. They did not win a match in 2007 but finished seventh in 2009 after winning 3 Group B matches and a positional playoff against Saudi Arabia.

In 2011, they finished sixth after winning 4 Group A matches and losing a positional playoff against the UAE.

In August 2017, Malaysia won two medals in cricket at the 2017 Southeast Asian Games. They won the gold medal in the 50-over tournament and the silver medal in the 20-over tournament.

=== 2018-Present ===
In April 2018, the ICC decided to grant full Twenty20 International (T20I) status to all its members. Therefore, all Twenty20 matches played between Malaysia and other ICC members after 1 January 2019 have the full T20I status.

Malaysia played their first T20I on 24 June against Thailand during the 2019 Malaysia Tri-Nation Series. They recorded a comfortable win.

24 June 2019
10:00
Scorecard

Thailand; 113/8 (20 overs)	v	Malaysia; 114/5 (17 overs)
Aaryan Kulkarni 37 (28); Muhamad Syahadat 3/7 (4 overs)		Muhamad Syahadat 41* (32); Mahsid Faheem 2/26 (4 overs)

Malaysia won by 5 wickets
Kinrara Oval, Kuala Lumpur
Umpires: Viswanadan Kalidas (Mas) and Mathan Kumar (Mas)
Player of the match: Muhamad Syahadat (Mas)

- Malaysia won the toss and elected to field.
- First ever T20I match for Malaysia.

After April 2019, Malaysia will play in the 2019–21 ICC Cricket World Cup Challenge League.

== Grounds ==
- Kinrara Academy Oval, Kuala Lumpur (Former)
- Bayuemas Oval, Kuala Lumpur
- Selangor Turf Club, Selangor
- Royal Selangor Club, Selangor
- UKM-YSD Cricket Oval, Bangi
- Kolej Tunku Abdul Jaafar Cricket Oval,Mantin,Negeri Sembilan
- Club Aman Cricket Ground,Ampang,Kuala Lumpur
Locations of all stadiums which have hosted an international cricket match within Malaysia

== Tournament history ==
Legend

- Champions
- Runners-up
- Third place/Semi-finals
- Hosts
- Q Qualified/Advanced to next stage
- DNQ Did not qualify
- ▲ Promoted
- Remained in the same division
- ▼ Relegated

=== Cricket World Cup ===
Cricket World Cup record								Qualification record				
Year	Round	Position	Pld	W	L	T	NR	Pld	W	L	T	NR
(England) 1975	Not invited							No qualifiers held				
(England) 1979	Did not qualify							4	0	3	0	1
(England) (Wales) 1983	Did not qualify							7	0	4	0	3
(India) (Pakistan) 1987	Did not qualify							6	3	3	0	0
(Australia) (New Zealand) 1992	Did not qualify							7	1	6	0	0
(India) (Pakistan) (Sri Lanka) 1996	Did not qualify							7	2	5	0	0
(England) (Wales) (Scotland) (Republic of Ireland) (Netherlands) 1999	Did not qualify							7	2	5	0	0
(South Africa) (Zimbabwe) (Kenya) 2003	Did not qualify							5	3	2	0	0
(Cricket West Indies) 2007	Did not qualify							5	2	3	0	0
(India) (Sri Lanka) (Bangladesh) 2011	Did not enter							Did not enter				
(Australia) (New Zealand) 2015	Did not qualify							24	12	12	0	0
(England) (Wales) 2019	Did not qualify							24	13	10	0	1
(India) 2023	Did not qualify							15	4	11	0	0
(South Africa) (Namibia) (Zimbabwe) 2027	Did not qualify							Did not qualify				
Total	—N/a	0/14	–	–	–	–	–	111	42	64	0	5

=== Cricket World Cup Qualifier ===
Cricket World Cup Qualifier record
Year	Round	Position	Pld	W	L	T	NR	Qual.
(England) 1979	Group stage	15/15	4	0	3	0	1	DNQ
(England) 1982	Group stage	15/16	7	0	4	0	3	DNQ
(England) 1986	Group stage	9/16	6	3	3	0	0	DNQ
(Netherlands) 1990	Group stage	14/17	7	1	6	0	0	DNQ
(Kenya) 1994	Wooden spoon round	13/20	7	2	5	0	0	DNQ
(Malaysia) 1997	First round	16/22	7	2	5	0	0	DNQ
(Canada) 2001	Division Two	17/24	5	3	2	0	0	DNQ
(Ireland) 2005 – 2027	Did not qualify							
Total	0 Titles	7/13	43	11	28	0	4	—N/a

=== CWC Challenge League ===
Cricket World Cup Challenge League record
Year	League	Position	Pld	W	L	T	NR	P/R
2019–2022	A	5/6	15	4	11	0	0	▼
2024–2026	Did not qualify							
Total	0 Titles	1/2	15	4	11	0	0	—N/a

=== Men's T20 World Cup ===
Men's T20 World Cup record								Qualification record				
Year	Round	Position	Pld	W	L	T	NR	Pld	W	L	T	NR
(South Africa) 2007	Not eligible							Not eligible				
(England) 2009	Not eligible							Not eligible				
(Cricket West Indies) 2010	Not eligible							Not eligible				
(Sri Lanka) 2012	Did not qualify							5	2	3	0	0
(Bangladesh) 2014	Did not qualify							4	2	2	0	0
(India) 2016	Did not qualify							5	2	3	0	0
(United Arab Emirates) (Oman) 2021	Did not qualify							10	4	5	0	1
(Australia) 2022	Did not qualify							Regional qualifiers cancelled				
(United States) (Cricket West Indies) 2024	Did not qualify							7	5	2	0	0
(India) (Sri Lanka) 2026	Did not qualify							8	5	3	0	0
(Australia) (New Zealand) 2028	To be determined							5*	3	2	0	0
Total	—N/a	0/10	–	–	–	–	–	44	23	20	0	1

=== T20 World Cup Asia Regional Final ===
T20 World Cup Asia Regional Final record
Year	Round	Position	Pld	W	L	T	NR	Qual.
(Singapore) 2019	Round-robin	5/5	4	1	3	0	0	DNQ
(Nepal) 2023	Round-robin	5/8	3	1	2	0	0	DNQ
(Oman) 2025	Group stage	7/9	2	0	2	0	0	DNQ
(To be determined) 2027	Qualified							
Total	0 Titles	4/4	9	2	7	0	0	—N/a

=== Asian Games ===
Asian Games record
Year	Round	Position	Pld	W	L	T	NR
(China) 2010	Quarter-finals	6/9	2	1	1	0	0
(South Korea) 2014	Quarter-finals	5/10	3	2	1	0	0
(China) 2022	Quarter-finals	5/12	3	2	1	0	0
(Japan) 2026	Quarter-finals	5/10	3	1	0	0	2
Total	0 Titles	4/4	11	6	3	0	2

=== Commonwealth Games ===
Commonwealth Games record
Year	Round	Position	Pld	W	L	T	NR
(Malaysia) 1998	Group stage	16/16	3	0	3	0	0
Total	0 Titles	1/1	3	0	3	0	0

=== Southeast Asian Games ===
Cricket at the SEA Games record
Year	Format	Round	Position	Pld	W	L	T	NR
(Malaysia) 2017	T20	Silver medal	2/6	3	2	1	0	0
(Malaysia) 2017	50 over	Gold medal	1/5	4	4	0	0	0
(Cambodia) 2023	6s	Did not participate						
(Cambodia) 2023	T10	Silver medal	2/6	3	1	2	0	0
(Cambodia) 2023	T20	Silver medal	2/6	3	2	1	0	0
(Cambodia) 2023	50 over	Silver medal	2/4	2	1	1	0	0
(Thailand) 2025	T10	Gold medal	1/5	4	4	0	0	0
(Thailand) 2025	T20	Gold medal	1/5	4	4	0	0	0
Total		3/3	3 Titles	23	18	5	0	0

=== Other international tournaments ===
ICC Intercontinental Cup (FC)	World Cricket League (LA/ODI/50 overs)
2004: First round	2009 (Division Six) : 4th place; 2011 (Division Six) : Runners-up (▲); 2012 (Division Five) : Runners-up (▲); 2012 (Division Four) : 5th place (▼); 2014 (Division Five) : Runners-up (▲); 2014 (Division Four) : Winners (▲); 2014 (Division Three) : 3rd place; 2017 (Division Three) : 6th place (▼); 2018 (Division Four) : 3rd place

=== Other regional tournaments ===
T20WC Asia Sub-regional Qualifiers (T20I)	ACC Premier Cup/Asia Cup Qualifier (OD/T20I)	ACC Challenger Cup (OD/T20I)	ACC Twenty20 Cup (T20)
2018: 3rd place (Q); 2021: Tournament cancelled; 2023: Winners (Q); 2024: Winners (Q); 2026: 3rd place (Q)	2018: 5th place (DNQ); 2023: 6th place (DNQ); 2024: 9th place (DNQ); 2026: 5th place (DNQ)	2026: Winners (Q)	2007: 10th place; 2009: 7th place; 2011: 6th place; 2013: 6th place; 2015: 5th place
ACC Trophy (OD)	ACC Eastern Region T20 (T20)	ACC Fast Track Countries Tournament	
1996: First round; 1998: Runners up; 2000: Semi-finals; 2002: Semi-finals; 2004: 7th place; 2006: 7th place; 2008 (Elite): 6th place; 2010 (Elite): 4th place; 2012 (Elite): 4th place; 2014 (Premier League): 6th place	2020: 3rd place	2004: 5th place; 2005: 3rd place; 2006: 4th place	

== Records and statistics ==
International Match Summary — Malaysia

Last updated 14 October 2026

Playing Record
Format	M	W	L	T	NR	Inaugural Match
Twenty20 Internationals	138	81	52	1	4	24 June 2019

=== Twenty20 International ===
- Highest team total: 268/4 v. Thailand on 2 October 2023 at Zhejiang University of Technology Cricket Field, Hangzhou.
- Highest individual score: 126, Syed Aziz v. Thailand on 2 October 2023 at Zhejiang University of Technology Cricket Field, Hangzhou.
- Best individual bowling figures: 7/8, Syazrul Idrus v. China on 26 July 2023 at Bayuemas Oval, Pandamaran.

Most T20I runs for Malaysia

Player	Runs	Average	Career span
Virandeep Singh	3,644	37.18	2019–2026
Syed Aziz	3,291	30.19	2019–2026
Ahmed Faiz	1,952	24.40	2019–2026
Zubaidi Zulkifle	1,269	18.94	2019–2026
Sharvin Muniandy	1,216	16.88	2019–2026

Most T20I wickets for Malaysia

Player	Wickets	Average	Career span
Virandeep Singh	141	13.24	2019–2026
Pavandeep Singh	120	18.25	2019–2026
Vijay Unni	95	18.26	2022–2026
Syed Aziz	86	22.80	2019–2026
Sharvin Muniandy	55	23.45	2019–2026

T20I record versus other nations

Records complete to T20I #4198. Last updated 14 October 2026.

Opponent	M	W	L	T	NR	First match	First win
vs Full Members
Bangladesh	1	0	1	0	0	4 October 2023	
vs Associate Members
Bahrain	13	6	7	0	0	15 December 2022	15 December 2022
Bhutan	4	4	0	0	0	2 July 2022	2 July 2022
Cambodia	1	0	1	0	0	11 May 2023	
China	3	3	0	0	0	26 July 2023	26 July 2023
Hong Kong	22	12	10	0	0	20 February 2020	20 February 2020
Indonesia	6	6	0	0	0	2 May 2023	2 May 2023
Kuwait	6	4	2	0	0	22 July 2019	22 July 2019
Maldives	6	5	0	0	1	25 June 2019	25 June 2019
Mongolia	1	1	0	0	0	9 September 2024	9 September 2024
Myanmar	2	2	0	0	0	30 July 2023	30 July 2023
Netherlands	2	0	1	1	0	18 April 2021	
Nepal	11	1	10	0	0	13 July 2019	29 February 2020
Oman	2	1	1	0	0	30 October 2023	7 June 2026
Papua New Guinea	6	2	4	0	0	29 March 2022	29 March 2022
Philippines	1	1	0	0	0	9 December 2025	9 December 2025
Qatar	5	1	3	0	1	27 July 2019	16 December 2022
Samoa	2	2	0	0	0	20 July 2025	20 July 2025
Saudi Arabia	5	3	2	0	0	13 April 2024	13 April 2024
Singapore	16	12	3	0	1	26 July 2019	29 June 2022
Tanzania	1	1	0	0	0	10 March 2024	10 March 2024
Thailand	12	11	0	0	1	24 June 2019	24 June 2019
United Arab Emirates	4	0	4	0	0	10 October 2025	
Vanuatu	6	3	3	0	0	29 September 2019	2 October 2019

=== Other records ===
Performances by Malaysian cricketers in World Cricket League matches and ACC Premier League matches, as of 29 June 2014

Current players
Name	Matches	Runs	Wickets
Ahmed Faiz	56	1505	0
Suhan Alagaratnam	54	1419	0
Shafiq Sharif	53	1166	0
Anwar Arudin	41	650	0
Suresh Navaratnam	36	371	48
Hassan Ghulam	31	169	36
Suharril Fetri	31	552	25
Shahrulnizam Yusof	29	39	37
Khizar Hayat	29	462	40
Aminuddin Ramly	23	346	6
Nasir Shafiq	17	632	8
Hamadullah Khan	16	159	10
Mohammad Shukri	16	86	8
Pavandeep Singh	8	13	8

Notable former players
Name	Matches	Runs	Wickets
Rakesh Madhavan	30	917	0
Eszrafiq Aziz	19	240	23
Nik Arifin	17	95	17
Hiran Ralalage	14	164	17
Dinesh Sockalingham	12	84	28
Damith Warusavithana	10	139	4
Hassan Mohammed	9	36	23

== Current squad ==
This lists all the players who have played for Malaysia in the past 12 months or has been part of the latest One-day or T20I squad. Updated as of 9 September 2024.

Name	Age	Batting style	Bowling style	Forms	Notes
Batters
Ahmad Faiz	38	Right-handed	Right-arm leg break	One-day & T20I	
Zubaidi Zulkifle	26	Right-handed	Right-arm medium	One-day & T20I	
Aqeel Wahid	24	Left-handed	Right-arm off break	One-day & T20I	
Aslam Khan	25	Right-handed	Right-arm off break	T20I	
Rajkumar Rajendran	37	Right-handed	Right-arm medium	T20I	
All-rounders
Syed Aziz	28	Left-handed	Right-arm medium	One-day & T20I	Captain
Virandeep Singh	27	Right-handed	Slow left-arm orthodox	One-day & T20I	
Muhammad Amir	25	Left-handed	Slow left-arm orthodox	One-day & T20I	
Sharvin Muniandy	31	Right-handed	Right-arm medium	One-day & T20I	
Muhamad Syahadat	32	Right-handed	Right-arm off break	One-day	
Wicketkeeper
Ainool Hafizs	30	Right-handed		One-day & T20I	
Spin Bowlers
Vijay Unni	23	Right-handed	Right-arm off break	One-day & T20I	
Khizar Hayat	37	Right-handed	Right-arm off break	One-day & T20I	
Pavandeep Singh	28	Right-handed	Slow left-arm orthodox	One-day & T20I	
Pace Bowlers
Muhammad Wafiq	30	Left-handed	Left-arm medium-fast	One-day	
Rizwan Haider	39	Right-handed	Left-arm medium-fast	One-day & T20I	
Azri Azhar	20	Right-handed	Right-arm medium	T20I	

== Tournaments ==
- Malaysia hosted the 2014 ICC World Cricket League Division Three in October.

== See also ==
- List of Malaysia Twenty20 International cricketers
- Malaysia national women's cricket team
- Malaya cricket team
- Federated Malay States cricket team
- Straits Settlements cricket team
- List of Malaysian Junior Cricketers
