= Dubai Cricket Council Grounds =

Cricket venue in Dubai

- Interactive map of Dubai Cricket Council Grounds
- Location: Al Jaddaf, Dubai
- Country: United Arab Emirates
- Coordinates: 25°12′53″N 55°19′33″E
- Establishment: 1996
- Owner: Dubai Cricket Council

Dubai Cricket Council Grounds were two adjacent turf cricket venues in the Al Jaddaf district of Dubai, United Arab Emirates. They served as the principal centre for league and community cricket in the emirate from the mid 1990s until their demolition in 2013, after which the land was incorporated into the expanding Dubai Healthcare City project.

== History ==
The airline Emirates financed and laid the first grass wickets on the site in 1996 and delegated day-to-day management to the Dubai Cricket Council. By 2000, the complex was hosting matches in the Asian Cricket Council Trophy. The grounds were selected for qualifying rounds of the ICC Champions Trophy in the 2004 to 2005 season.

At their peak, the two venues contained seven grass pitches surrounded by practice nets and cement strips and staged about five hundred fixtures each year ranging from school tournaments to expatriate corporate leagues. The council also set out eight individual plots inside the compound, which enabled it to organise as many as twenty-five domestic competitions per season.

Rapid urban development earmarked Al Jaddaf for mixed-use projects and the council agreed to surrender its lease in stages after 2006. In January 2013, Bulldozers levelled the playing fields to allow hand-over to the Dubai Healthcare City Authority.

After the demolition, the council hired private facilities for every event it organised and struggled to re-establish its academy, equipment stores and offices.

In 2011, Emirates and the council announced a long-term arrangement allowing the body to schedule matches at the multi-sport Sevens complex on the Dubai to Al Ain corridor, creating six replacement turf pitches though at higher running costs.
