= Saeed-Al-Saffar =

Emirati cricketer (born 1968)

Saeed-al-Saffar
Cricket information
- Batting: Left-handed
- Bowling: Left-arm fast-medium
- Source: CricInfo, 15 August 2022

Saeed-al-Saffar (born 31 July 1968) is an Emirati former cricketer who has represented the UAE at the international level, most notably in the One Day International the Emirates side played against the Netherlands in Lahore in the 1996 Cricket World Cup. He also competed for the UAE in the 1996–97 and 2001 versions of the ICC Trophy, which is the qualifying competition for the World Cup played by non-Test nations.

He has the distinction of scoring a double hundred against Thailand in the ACC Trophy, scoring 209 not out, which is a huge feat in the one day form of the game.

He also carries the record for the third wicket for the domestic competition in Sharjah Cricket Stadium in Ramadhan Night Tournament, where he along with Qais Farooq put up 217 runs for the 3rd wicket.

His only ODI was where he did not bat and bowled 3 overs conceding 25 runs without taking a wicket.
