= 2013 EAP Twenty20 Championship =

2013 ICC East Asia-Pacific Men's Championship
- Administrator: EAP
- Cricket format: Twenty20
- Tournament format: Group Stage with Finals
- Host: New Zealand
- Champions: Papua New Guinea
- Participants: 7
- Matches: 22
- Player of the series: (Samoa) Benjamin Mailata
- Most runs: (Papua New Guinea) Assad Vala (395)
- Most wickets: (Samoa) Benjamin Mailata (14)

The 2013 ICC East Asia-Pacific Men's Championship was a cricket tournament held between 3–7 February 2013 in Auckland, New Zealand. The tournament was a Twenty20 competition with the winner promoted to the 2013 ICC World Twenty20 Qualifier in the United Arab Emirates.

== Teams ==
Teams that qualified are as follows:

- Cook Islands
- Fiji
- Indonesia
- Japan
- Papua New Guinea
- Samoa
- Vanuatu

The teams of Philippines and South Korea did not participate due to their implementation of the wrong selection policy, whereas the team from Tonga pulled out due to political squabbles in the board.

== Squads ==
Cook Islands	Fiji	Indonesia	Japan
Corey Fisher (c); Osolai Akai; Patiiamai Ataela; Manu Emile; Tino Etita; Joe Joseph; Jon Kairua; Melody Melota; Shane Munokoa; Wayken Punga; Alister Stevic; Alan Syme; Davies Teinaki; Toara Teinaki	Josefa Rika (C); Jone Batinibulu; Eric Browne; Greg Browne; Joji Bulabalavu; Iniasi Cakacaka; Samuela Draunivudi; Peniseni Kotoisuva; Vuiyasawa Mateiwaqa; Rukesh Patel; Sekove Ravoka; Colin Rika; Tukana Tavo; Viliame Yabaki	Frengky Shony (c); Igede Arsa; Ikadek Astawe; Viraj Bhammar; Desandri; Ikadek Gamantika; Agung Kusuma; Fernandes Nato; Ahmad Ramdoni; Rizky Rubbi; Muhammad Tadarus; Ikadek Darmawan; Iwayan Suandi; Febrian Wiyoko	Alexander Patmore (C); Takuro Hagihara; Shunsuke Hashiba; Naoki Miyaji; Naotsune Miyaji; Satoshi Nakano; Toshiki Nishimura; Kazuyuki Ogawa; Shohei Ogawa; Tomoki Ota; Seiji Sugiura; Tsuyoshi Takada; Makoto Taniyama; Shodai Yamada

Papua New Guinea	Samoa	Vanuatu
Chris Amini (C); Charles Amini; Hitolo Areni; Sese Bau; Mahuru Dai; Willie Gavera; Christopher Kent; Jason Kila; Pipi Raho; Lega Siaka; Tony Ura; Assad Vala; Norman Vanua; Jack Vare (Wk)	Benjamin Mailata (C); Geoff Clarke (vc) (wk); Tiafala Alatasi; Daniel Burgess; Sean Cotter; Aleki Iasoni; Taitoe Kaisala (wk); Winston Mariner; Faasao Mulivai; Pritchard Pritchard; Murphy Su'a; Fereti Sululoto; Naa Vaasili; Ian West	Andrew Mansale (C); Jonathon Dunn (vc); Jelany Chilia; Aby John; Worford Kalworai; Trevor Langa (wk); Steven Lynch; Patrick Matautaava; Manu Nimoho; Nalin Nipiko; Simpson Obed; Jaxies Samuel; Kenny Tari; Niko Unavalu

== Fixtures ==
=== Group stage ===
==== Points table ====
Team	P	W	L	T	NR	Points	NRR
Papua New Guinea	6	6	0	0	0	12	+4.000
Vanuatu	6	5	1	0	0	10	+3.398
Fiji	6	4	2	0	0	8	+1.624
Samoa	6	3	3	0	0	6	+2.401
Japan	6	2	4	0	0	4	-2.369
Cook Islands	6	1	5	0	0	2	-3.208
Indonesia	6	0	6	0	0	0	-6.250

Teams that qualified for the final.

==== Matches ====
3 February
10:30 AM
Scorecard

Japan; 86 (18.5 overs)	v	Samoa; 88/2 (12.4 overs)
Alexander Patmore 43 (43); Ian West 5/10 (4 overs)		Sean Cotter 42* (31); Satoshi Nakano 1/3 (1 over)

Samoa won by 8 wickets
Waikaraka Park Sports Ground, Onehunga, Auckland
Player of the match: Ian West (Sam)

- Samoa won the toss and elected to field.

3 February
10:30 AM
Scorecard

Vanuatu; 221/4 (20 overs)	v	Cook Islands; 103/6 (20 overs)
Andrew Mansale 99* (52); Alan Syme 1/10 (1 over)		Patiiamai Ataela 31 (26); Kenny Tari 2/6 (3 overs)

Vanuatu won by 118 runs
Waikaraka Park Sports Ground, Onehunga, Auckland
Player of the match: Andrew Mansale (Van)

- Vanuatu won the toss and elected to bat.

3 February
10:30 AM
Scorecard

Indonesia; 46 (16.2 overs)	v	Fiji; 49/0 (5.3 overs)
Ikadek Darmawan 10 (19); Jone Batinibulu 4/7 (4 overs)		Sekove Ravoka 28* (22)

Fiji won by 10 wickets
Waikaraka Park Sports Ground, Onehunga, Auckland
Player of the match: Jone Batinibulu (Fij)

- Fiji won the toss and elected to field.

3 February
3:00 PM
Scorecard

Papua New Guinea; 157/7 (20 overs)	v	Samoa; 140/7 (20 overs)
Christopher Kent 57 (40); Benjamin Mailata 3/20 (4 overs)		Faasao Mulivai 62 (25); Mahuru Dai 2/18 (2 overs)

Papua New Guinea won by 17 runs
Waikaraka Park Sports Ground, Onehunga, Auckland
Player of the match: Faasao Mulivai (Sam)

- Samoa won the toss and elected to field.

3 February
3:00 PM
Scorecard

Cook Islands; 159/6 (20 overs)	v	Indonesia; 112 (16 overs)
Tino Etita 50 (35); Ikadek Darmawan 2/12 (3 overs)		Viraj Bhammar 66* (44); Toara Teinaki 3/13 (2 overs)

Cook Islands won by 47 runs
Waikaraka Park Sports Ground, Onehunga, Auckland
Player of the match: Tino Etita (Cok)

- Indonesia won the toss and elected to field.

3 February
3:00 PM
Scorecard

Vanuatu; 196/2 (20 overs)	v	Japan; 91/9 (20 overs)
Andrew Mansale 96* (55); Naotsune Miyaji 1/25 (4 overs)		Alexander Patmore 29 (31); Jelany Chilia 2/6 (4 overs)

Vanuatu won by 105 runs
Waikaraka Park Sports Ground, Onehunga, Auckland
Player of the match: Andrew Mansale (Van)

- Vanuatu won the toss and elected to bat.

4 February
10:30 AM
Scorecard

Japan; 38 (14 overs)	v	Fiji; 40/1 (8.3 overs)
Naoki Miyaji 10 (16); Tukana Tavo 3/6 (4 overs)		Colin Rika 19* (29); Satoshi Nakano 1/14 (2 overs)

Fiji won by 9 wickets
Waikaraka Park Sports Ground, Onehunga, Auckland
Player of the match: Tukana Tavo (Fij)

- Fiji won the toss and elected to field.

4 February
10:30 AM
Scorecard

Papua New Guinea; 267/2 (20 overs)	v	Indonesia; 70 (17.2 overs)
Assad Vala 157* (64); Ikadek Astawe 1/24 (2 overs)		Iwayan Suandi 15 (16); Jason Kila 3/7 (4 overs)

Papua New Guinea won by 197 runs
Waikaraka Park Sports Ground, Onehunga, Auckland
Player of the match: Assad Vala (PNG)

- Indonesia won the toss and elected to field.

4 February
10:30 AM
Scorecard

Samoa; 111/7 (20 overs)	v	Vanuatu; 113/9 (17.2 overs)
Daniel Burgess 50* (50); Kenny Tari 4/18 (4 overs)		Trevor Langa 46 (37); Daniel Burgess 2/12 (2 overs)

Vanuatu won by 1 wicket
Waikaraka Park Sports Ground, Onehunga, Auckland
Player of the match: Kenny Tari (Sam)

- Vanuatu won the toss and elected to field.

4 February
3:00 PM
Scorecard

Papua New Guinea; 199/7 (20 overs)	v	Vanuatu; 169/9 (20 overs)
Assad Vala 71 (40); Niko Unavalu 3/34 (4 overs)		Nalin Nipiko 57 (38); Willie Gavera 5/23 (4 overs)

Papua New Guinea won by 30 runs
Waikaraka Park Sports Ground, Onehunga, Auckland
Player of the match: Willie Gavera (PNG)

- Papua New Guinea won the toss and elected to bat.

4 February
3:00 PM
Scorecard

Indonesia; 93 (17.3 overs)	v	Japan; 94/2 (16.1 overs)
Viraj Bhammar 25 (25); Naoki Miyaji 2/10 (2 overs)		Alexander Patmore 54* (56); Desandri 1/15 (3 overs)

Japan won by 8 wickets
Waikaraka Park Sports Ground, Onehunga, Auckland
Player of the match: Alexander Patmore (Jap)

- Japan won the toss and elected to field.

4 February
3:00 PM
Scorecard

Fiji; 178/6 (20 overs)	v	Cook Islands; 100 (17.1 overs)
Sekove Ravoka 59 (43); Manu Emile 3/15 (2 overs)		Tino Etita 36 (19); Vuiyasawa Mateiwaqa 3/22 (4 overs)

Fiji won by 78 runs
Waikaraka Park Sports Ground, Onehunga, Auckland
Player of the match: Sekove Ravoka (Fij)

- Cook Islands won the toss and elected to field.

6 February
10:00 AM
Scorecard

Papua New Guinea; 146 (19.3 overs)	v	Fiji; 105/8 (20 overs)
Mahuru Dai 48 (37); Samuela Draunivudi 4/41 (4 overs)		Joji Bulabalavu 57* (48); Willie Gavera 2/5 (3 overs)

Papua New Guinea won by 41 runs
Waikaraka Park Sports Ground, Onehunga, Auckland
Player of the match: Joji Bulabalavu (Fij)

- Papua New Guinea won the toss and elected to bat.

6 February
10:00 AM
Scorecard

Japan; 144/8 (20 overs)	v	Cook Islands; 120/5 (20 overs)
Tomoki Ota 51 (50); Toara Teinaki 3/42 (4 overs)		Davies Teinaki 41 (55); Naoki Miyaji 2/28 (4 overs)

Japan won by 24 runs
Waikaraka Park Sports Ground, Onehunga, Auckland
Player of the match: Tomoki Ota (Jap)

- Cook Islands won the toss and elected to field.

6 February
10:00 AM
Scorecard

Samoa; 238/3 (20 overs)	v	Indonesia; 63/9 (20 overs)
Benjamin Mailata 114* (61); Agung Kusuma 1/21 (2 overs)		Viraj Bhammar 22 (26); Benjamin Mailata 4/5 (4 overs)

Samoa won by 175 runs
Waikaraka Park Sports Ground, Onehunga, Auckland
Player of the match: Benjamin Mailata (Sam)

- Indonesia won the toss and elected to field.

6 February
3:00 PM
Scorecard

Papua New Guinea; 193/8 (20 overs)	v	Cook Islands; 79 (13.1 overs)
Assad Vala 68 (33); Corey Fisher 3/19 (2 overs)		Corey Fisher 26 (12); Pipi Raho 3/33 (3 overs)

Papua New Guinea won by 114 runs
Waikaraka Park Sports Ground, Onehunga, Auckland
Player of the match: Corey Fisher (Cok)

- Cook Islands won the toss and elected to field.

6 February
3:00 PM
Scorecard

Samoa; 143/7 (20 overs)	v	Fiji; 146/7 (18.2 overs)
Benjamin Mailata 70 (52); Sekove Ravoka 4/29 (4 overs)		Vuiyasawa Mateiwaqa 41 (20); Daniel Burgess 3/25 (4 overs)

Fiji won by 3 wickets
Waikaraka Park Sports Ground, Onehunga, Auckland
Player of the match: Sekove Ravoka (Fij)

- Samoa won the toss and elected to bat.

6 February
3:00 PM
Scorecard

Indonesia; 90/6 (20 overs)	v	Vanuatu; 94/1 (6.4 overs)
Ahmad Ramdoni 35 (55); Patrick Matautaava 2/6 (4 overs)		Jonathon Dunn 72* (28); Ikadek Darmawan 1/18 (1.4 overs)

Vanuatu won by 9 wickets
Waikaraka Park Sports Ground, Onehunga, Auckland
Player of the match: Jonathon Dunn (Van)

- Indonesia won the toss and elected to bat.

7 February
10:00 AM
Scorecard

Fiji; 98 (17.4 overs)	v	Vanuatu; 99/3 (13.2 overs)
Vuiyasawa Mateiwaqa 22 (13); Jaxies Samuel 2/8 (4 overs)		Patrick Matautaava 37 (24); Samuela Draunivudi 1/10 (2 overs)

Vanuatu won by 7 wickets
Waikaraka Park Sports Ground, Onehunga, Auckland
Player of the match: Jaxies Samuel (Van)

- Vanuatu won the toss and elected to field.

7 February
10:00 AM
Scorecard

Samoa; 207/7 (20 overs)	v	Cook Islands; 109 (18.3 overs)
Benjamin Mailata 85* (58); Tino Etita 3/34 (4 overs)		Patiiamai Ataela 32 (29); Sean Cotter 3/13 (2 overs)

Samoa won by 98 runs
Waikaraka Park Sports Ground, Onehunga, Auckland
Player of the match: Benjamin Mailata (Sam)

- Cook Islands won the toss and elected to field.

7 February
10:00 AM
Scorecard

Papua New Guinea; 206/8 (20 overs)	v	Japan; 125/6 (20 overs)
Charles Amini 68 (43); Takuro Hagihara 3/46 (4 overs)		Tomoki Ota 36* (23); Chris Amini 1/8 (1 over)

Papua New Guinea won by 81 runs
Waikaraka Park Sports Ground, Onehunga, Auckland
Player of the match: Charles Amini (PNG)

- Papua New Guinea won the toss and elected to bat.

=== Final ===
7 February
3:00 PM
Scorecard

Papua New Guinea; 159/6 (20 overs)	v	Vanuatu; 121 (19 overs)
Charles Amini 51 (30); Kenny Tari 2/26 (4 overs)		Worford Kalworai 38 (27); Norman Vanua 3/19 (4 overs)

Papua New Guinea won by 38 runs
Waikaraka Park Sports Ground, Onehunga, Auckland
Player of the match: Charles Amini (PNG)

- Papua New Guinea won the toss and elected to bat.
- Papua New Guinea won the 2013 ICC East Asia-Pacific Men's Championship and qualified for 2013 ICC World Twenty20 Qualifier as a result of this match.

== Statistics ==
=== Most Runs ===
The top five run scorers (total runs) are included in this table.

Player	Team	Runs	Inns	Avg	S/R	HS	100s	50s
Assad Vala	Papua New Guinea	395	7	65.83	180.37	157*	1	2
Benjamin Mailata	Samoa	291	6	97.00	146.23	114*	1	2
Andrew Mansale	Vanuatu	239	6	79.66	153.21	99*	0	2
Christopher Kent	Papua New Guinea	204	6	51.00	128.30	57	0	2
Jonathon Dunn	Vanuatu	203	7	33.83	135.33	72*	0	2

=== Most Wickets ===
The top five wicket takers (total wickets) are listed in this table.

Player	Team	Wkts	Mts	Ave	S/R	Econ	BBI
Benjamin Mailata	Samoa	14	6	8.00	9.9	4.86	4/5
Willie Gavera	Papua New Guinea	11	7	9.54	10.9	5.25	5/23
Pipi Raho	Papua New Guinea	10	5	10.60	10.2	6.23	3/29
Samuela Draunivudi	Fiji	10	6	11.8	14.1	5.00	4/12
Daniel Burgess	Samoa	9	6	9.77	10.0	5.86	3/14

== See also ==
- 2013 ICC World Twenty20 Qualifier
- World Cricket League Africa Region
