= 2008 ACC Trophy Elite =

Asian one-day cricket tournament

- Administrator: Asian Cricket Council
- Cricket format: 50 overs per side
- Tournament format: round robin with playoffs
- Host: Malaysia
- Champions: Hong Kong (1st title)
- Participants: 10 teams
- Matches: 27
- Player of the series: (United Arab Emirates) Arshad Ali
- Most runs: (Qatar) Omer Taj
- Most wickets: (Malaysia) Dinesh Sockalingham
- Official website: Asiancricket.org

The 2008 ACC Trophy Elite was a cricket tournament in Kuala Lumpur, Malaysia, taking place between 25 July and 3 August 2008. It gives Associate and Affiliate members of the Asian Cricket Council experience of international one-day cricket and also forms part of the regional qualifications for the ICC World Cricket League

== Teams ==
After the 2006 ACC Trophy it was decided to split the tournament into two divisions. The placement of teams in the divisions was based on their final positions in the last ACC Trophy. The top ten teams went on to take part in the 2008 ACC Trophy Elite and the remaining teams were placed in a lower division, the 2009 ACC Trophy Challenge. The teams that made it into the Trophy Elite were:

- Afghanistan
- Bahrain
- Hong Kong
- Kuwait
- Malaysia
- Nepal
- Qatar
- Saudi Arabia
- Singapore
- United Arab Emirates

== Squads ==
Afghanistan	Bahrain	Hong Kong	Kuwait	Malaysia
Nowroz Mangal (Captain) Karim Khan; Raees Ahmadzai; Dawlat Ahmadzai; Ahmed Shah; Mohammad Nabi; Noor Ali; Hasti Gul; Samiullah Shenwari; Asghar Afghan; Hamid Hassan; Noor ul Haq; Shafiqullah Shafaq; Aimal Wafa; Zarab Shah (Manager); Taj Malik (Coach)	Fahad Sadeq (Captain) Mirza Yaqoob; Azeem-ul-Haq; Akmal Malik; Muhammad Yaqoob; Abdul Waheed; Qamar Saeed; Ashraf Mughal; Tahir Dar; Halal Abbasi; Haroon Zafar; Imran Sajjad; Rizwan Baig; Dharmesh Kumar; M.H.M. Sadeq (Manager); Mukhtar Ahmed Yousuf (Coach)	Tabarak Dar (Captain) Zain Abbas; Zafran Ali; James Atkinson; Ilyas Gul; Roy Lamsam; Shakeel Haq; Ashish Gadhia; Hussain Butt; Irfan Ahmed; Nadeem Ahmed; Najeeb Amar; Skhawat Ali; Moner Ahmed; Jawad Ashraf (Manager); Aaftab Habib (Coach)	Hisham Mirza (Captain) Mustansar Hasan; Saud Qamar; Sibtain Raza; Abdulrehman Liaqat; Saad Khalid; Mohammad Akhudzada; Mohammad Murad; Khalid Yameen; Mohammad Ahsan; Jagath Roshantha; Mohammad Javed; Faisal Nadeem; Nadeem Malik; Emad Al Jassam (Manager); Tahir Khan (Coach)	Rohan Suppiah (Captain) Rakesh Madhavan; Suhan Alagaratnam; Darvin Muralitharan; Nasir Ali; Ahmad Faiz; Eszrafiq Azis; Shukri Rahim; Dinesh Sockalingham; P. Wickramasinghe; Suresh Navaratnam; M. Krishnamurthi; Anwar Arudin; Rosman Zakaria; Ramesh Menon (Manager); Romesh Kaluwitharana (Coach)
Nepal	Qatar	Saudi Arabia	Singapore	United Arab Emirates
Binod Das (Captain) Paras Khadka; Gyanendra Malla; Mehboob Alam; Mahesh Chhetri; Sanjam Regmi; Raj Pradhan; Dipendra Chaudhary; Sharad Vesawkar; Amrit Bhattarai; Shakti Gauchan; Kanishka Chaugai; Paresh Lohani; Basanta Regmi; Pawan Agarwal (Manager); Roy Dias (Coach)	Omer Taj (Captain) Mohammad Jahangir; Saleem Akhtar; Abbas Khan; Tamoor Sajjad; Imtinan Mirza; Faisal Noor; Usman Malik; Haroon Abbasi; Sardar Badshah; Rusharat Ali; Zaheer-ud-din Ibrahim; Anwar Packer; Asram Muhammad; Nazar Malik (Manager); Shamas u din Khadas (Coach)	Sarfaz Ahmed (Captain) Suhrab Kilsingatakam; Asif Shamshad; Hammad Saeed; Khashef Riaz; Sajjad Hussain; Abid Naseem; Shafiq Ahmed; Khalid Butt; Hussain Anwar; Mohammad Amjad; Abbas Al-Nadwi; Ahmed Al-Nadwi; Ijaz Sagheer; Nidal Khan (Manager); Mansoor Akhtar (Coach)	Chaminda Ruwan (Captain) Glenn Meyer; Muhammad Ali; Narender Reddy; Chetan Suryawanshi; Sagar Kulkarni; Vivek Vedagiri; Shoaib Razzak; Rizwan Madakia; Christopher Janik; Irfan Madakia; Dharmichand Mulewa; Munish Arora; Pramodh Raja; Harnam Singh (Manager); M. Venkataramana (Coach)	Khurram Khan (Captain) Mohammad Tauqir; Saqib Ali; Arshad Ali; Zahid Shah; Amjad Ali; Shadeep Silva; Salman Farooq; Fahad Alhashmi; Shoaib Sarwar; Riaz Khaliq; Qasim Zubair; Rameez Shahzad; Mohammad Iqbal; Mazhar Khan (Manager); Vasbert Drakes (Coach)

== Match Officials ==
- Tanvir Ahmed (Bangladesh)
- D Ekanayake (Sri Lanka)
- SS Hazare (India)
- Aminul Islam (Bangladesh)
- RR Jadeja (India)
- GF Labrooy (Sri Lanka)
- Khalid Mahmood (Pakistan)
- SJ Phadkar (India)
- BB Pradhan (Nepal)
- SS Prasad (Singapore)
- Anisur Rahman (Bangladesh)
- Samiur Rahman (Bangladesh)
- RJ Ratnayake (Sri Lanka)
- Aziz-ur-Rehman (Pakistan)
- Abdus Sami (Pakistan)
- SH Sarathkumara (Sri Lanka)
- Anis Siddiqi (Pakistan)
- Iqbal Sikander (Pakistan)

== Group stage ==
=== Group A ===
==== Points Tables ====
Green denotes teams going into the semifinals.

Team	Pld	W	T	L	NR	Pts	NRR
Afghanistan	4	3	0	1	0	6	+0.96
United Arab Emirates	4	3	0	1	0	6	+0.70
Malaysia	4	2	0	2	0	4	+0.51
Bahrain	4	1	0	3	0	2	+0.27
Saudi Arabia	4	1	0	3	0	2	-2.54
Sourceː

==== Fixtures and results ====
25 July 2008
scorecard

Malaysia; 267/8 (50 overs)	v	Bahrain; 234 all out (49.2 overs)
Eszrafiq Azis 63 (42); Halal Abbasi 2/36 (10 overs)		Imran Sajjad 73 (53); DM Sockalingham 4/35 (9 overs)

Malaysia won by 33 runs
Kinrara Academy Oval, Kuala Lumpur
Umpires: A Rahman (Bangladesh) and A Siddiqi (Pakistan)
Player of the match: Eszrafiq Aziz (Malaysia)

25 July 2008
scorecard

Saudi Arabia; 228 all out (50 overs)	v	United Arab Emirates; 199 all out (30 overs)
Khalid Butt 110 (96); Khurram Khan 3/31 (9 overs)		Saqib Ali 48 (42); Shafiq Ahmed 5/45 (9 overs)

Saudi Arabia won by 29 runs
Royal Military College, Kuala Lumpur
Umpires: BB Pradhan (Nepal) and SH Sarathkumara (Sri Lanka)
Player of the match: Shafiq Ahmed (Saudi Arabia)

26 July 2008
scorecard

Afghanistan; 214 all out (48.1 overs)	v	United Arab Emirates; 217/7 (47.1 overs)
Nowroz Mangal 55 (67); Riaz Khaliq 3/27 (8.2 overs)		Arshad Ali 68 (127); Karim Khan 3/33 (10 overs)

United Arab Emirates won by 3 wickets
Bayuemas Oval, Kuala Lumpur
Umpires: D Ekanayake (Sri Lanka) and SS Prasad (Singapore)
Player of the match: Arshad Ali (United Arab Emirates)

26 July 2008
scorecard

Bahrain; 335 all out (49.2 overs)	v	Saudi Arabia; 137 all out (33.1 overs)
Azeem-ul-Haq 79 (80); Abid Naseem 2/31 (5 overs)		Suhrab Kilsingatakam 52 (93); Fahad Sadeq 3/34 (10 overs)

Bahrain won by 198 runs
Selangor Turf Club, Kuala Lumpur
Umpires: A Siddiqi (Pakistan) and T Ahmed (Bangladesh)
Player of the match: Azeem-ul-Haq (Bahrain)

27 July 2008
scorecard

Afghanistan; 263/9 (50 overs)	v	Malaysia; 197 all out (46.3 overs)
Karim Khan 81 (73); Dinesh Sockalingham 4/49 (10 overs)		M Krishnamurthi 34 (62); Nowroz Mangal 5/24 (5.3 overs)

Afghanistan won by 66 runs
Selangor Turf Club, Kuala Lumpur
Umpires: SS Hazare (India) and SH Sarathkumara (Sri Lanka)
Player of the match: Nowroz Mangal (Afghanistan)

28 July 2008
scorecard

Bahrain; 122 all out (33.3 overs)	v	United Arab Emirates; 124/2 (28 overs)
Imran Sajjad 47 (46); Mohammad Tauqir 4/19 (9 overs)		Arshad Ali 46* (96); Azeem-ul-Haq 2/20 (6 overs)

United Arab Emirates won by 8 wickets
Bayeumas Oval, Kuala Lumpur
Umpires: A Rehman (Pakistan) and SH Sarathkumara (Sri Lanka)
Player of the match: Mohammad Tauqir (United Arab Emirates)

29 July 2008
scorecard

Saudi Arabia; 172 all out (48.2 overs)	v	Afghanistan; 175/4 (25.3 overs)
Abid Naseem 67 (100); Mohammad Nabi 5/30 (8.2 overs)		Noor Ali 70* (49); Ijaz Sagheer 1/27 (5 overs)

Afghanistan won by 6 wickets
Kinrara Academy Oval, Kuala Lumpur
Umpires: SJ Phadkar (India) and BB Pradhan (Nepal)
Player of the match: Mohammad Nabi (Afghanistan)

29 July 2008
scorecard

United Arab Emirates; 211 all out (42.2 overs)	v	Malaysia; 154 all out (47.1 overs)
Arshad Ali 67 (103); Dinesh Sockalingham 6/39 (9 overs)		M Krishnamurthi 40* (71); Shadeep Silva 3/19 (7.1 overs)

United Arab Emirates won by 57 runs
Selangor Turf Club, Kuala Lumpur
Umpires: D Ekanayake (Sri Lanka) and SS Prasad (Singapore)
Player of the match: Arshad Ali (United Arab Emirates)

30 July 2008
scorecard

Afghanistan; 293/9 (50 overs)	v	Bahrain; 286/9 (50 overs)
Asghar Stanikzai 102 (110); Halal Abbasi 2/25 (7 overs)		Ashraf Mughal 81 (81); Dawlat Ahmadzi 3/39 (8 overs)

Afghanistan won by 7 runs
Bayuemas Oval, Kuala Lumpur
Umpires: A Rehman (Pakistan) and BB Pradhan (Nepal)
Player of the match: Asghar Stanikzai (Afghanistan)

30 July 2008
scorecard

Malaysia; 316/8 (50 overs)	v	Saudi Arabia; 123 all out (32.2 overs)
Rakesh Madhavan 101 (137); Sarfaz Ahmed 2/33 (10 overs)		Sarfaz Ahmed 44 (73); P Wickramasinghe 3/8 (5.2 overs)

Malaysia won by 193 runs
Kinrara Academy Oval, Kuala Lumpur
Umpires: SS Hazare (India) and T Ahmed (Bangladesh)
Player of the match: Rakesh Madhavan (Malaysia)

=== Group B ===
==== Points Tables ====
Green denotes teams going into the semifinals.

Team	Pld	W	T	L	NR	Pts	NRR
Nepal	4	4	0	0	0	8	+1.15
Hong Kong	4	3	0	1	0	6	+1.48
Singapore	4	1	0	3	0	2	-0.62
Kuwait	4	1	0	3	0	2	-0.91
Qatar	4	1	0	3	0	2	-1.26
Sourceː

==== Fixtures and results ====
25 July 2008
scorecard

Singapore; 227/9 (50 overs)	v	Qatar; 192 all out (44.5 overs)
Chetan Suryawanshi 49 (38); Abbas Khan 2/19 (10 overs)		Tamoor Sajjad 58 (97); Chaminda Ruwan 5/46 (10 overs)

Singapore won by 35 runs
Bayuemas Oval, Kuala Lumpur
Umpires: SJ Phadkar (India) and T Ahmed (Bangladesh)
Player of the match: Chaminda Ruwan (Singapore)

25 July 2008
scorecard

Nepal; 245/7 (50 overs)	v	Hong Kong; 201/9 (50 overs)
Paras Khadka 81 (72); Ilyas Gull 2/31 (6 overs))		Hussain Butt 52 (123); Basanta Regmi 3/41 (10 overs

Nepal won by 44 runs
Selangor Turf Club, Kuala Lumpur
Umpires: S Prasad (Singapore) and D Ekanayaka (Sri Lanka)
Player of the match: Paras Khadka (Nepal)

26 July 2008
scorecard

Singapore; 237/9 (50 overs)	v	Kuwait; 238/9 (44.5 overs)
Chetan Suryawanshi 65 (68); Mohammad Murad 3/41 (5 overs)		Mohammad Ahsan 91* (76); Chaminda Ruwan 3/32 (10 overs)

Kuwait won by 1 wicket
Kinrara Academy Oval, Kuala Lumpur
Umpires: SS Hazare (India) and Khalid Mahmood (Pakistan)
Player of the match: Mohammad Ahsan (Kuwait)

26 July 2008
scorecard

Qatar; 171 all out (47.2 overs)	v	Nepal; 172/3 (37.3 overs)
Omer Taj 48 (77); Shakti Gauchan 3/25 (10 overs)		Gyanendra Malla 76* (82); Abbas Khan 2/40 (10 overs)

Nepal won by 7 wickets
Royal Military College, Kuala Lumpur
Umpires: A Rahman (Bangladesh) and SJ Phadkar (India)
Player of the match: Shakti Gauchan (Nepal)

27 July 2008
scorecard

Kuwait; 161 all out (46.2 overs)	v	Hong Kong; 164/4 (35.5 overs)
Sibtain Raza 47 (70); Nadeem Ahmed 4/28 (10 overs)		Hussain Butt 53* (66); Saad Khalid 1/18 (2 overs)

Hong Kong won by 6 wickets
Bayeumas Oval, Kuala Lumpur
Umpires: K Mahmood (Pakistan) and BB Bradhan (Nepal)
Player of the match: Hussain Butt (Hong Kong)

28 July 2008
scorecard

Hong Kong; 276 all out (49.2 overs)	v	Qatar; 100 all out (19 overs)
Munir Dar 89 (52); Haroon Abbasi 3/41 (10 overs)		Omer Taj 30 (32); Irfan Ahmed 5/47 (8 overs)

Hong Kong won by 176 runs
Selangor Turf Club, Kuala Lumpur
Umpires: A Rahman (Bangladesh) and SS Prasad (Singapore)
Player of the match: Ilyas Gul (Hong Kong)

28 July 2008
scorecard

Singapore; 155/9 (50 overs)	v	Nepal; 156/4 (40.5 overs)
Chaminda Ruwan 40 (83); Mehboob Alam 3/25 (10 overs)		Paras Khadka 71* (97); Pramodh Raja 2/28 (8 overs)

Nepal won by 6 wickets
Kinrara Academy Oval, Kuala Lumpur
Umpires: D Ekanayake (Sri Lanka) and T Ahmed (Bangladesh)
Player of the match: Paras Khadka (Nepal)

29 July 2008
scorecard

Qatar; 322 all out (48.3 overs)	v	Kuwait; 298 all out (46 overs)
Mohammad Jahangir (86); Sibtain Raza 5/55 (9.3 overs)		Jagath Roshantha (55); Sardar Badshah 3/45 (10 overs)

Qatar won by 24 runs
Bayuemas Oval, Kuala Lumpur
Umpires: SS Hazare (India) and K Mahmood (Pakistan)
Player of the match: Mohammad Jahangir (Qatar)

30 July 2008
scorecard

Hong Kong; 255/9 (50 overs)	v	Singapore; 162 all out (36.2 overs)
Skhawat Ali 83 (119); Mohammad Ali 5/45 (9 overs)		Glenn Meyer 35 (31); Najeeb Amar 3/34 (8.2 overs)

Hong Kong won by 93 runs
Royal Military College, Kuala Lumpur
Umpires: A Rahman (Bangladesh) and SJ Phadkar (India)
Player of the match: Zain Abbas (Hong Kong)

30 July 2008
scorecard

Kuwait; 103 all out (38.1 overs)	v	Nepal; 104/3 (29 overs)
Mohammad Murad 19 (17); Shakti Gauchan 3/5 (8 overs)		Sharad Vesawkar 28* (80); Mohammad Javed 2/18 (10 overs)

Nepal won by 7 wickets
Selangor Turf Club, Kuala Lumpur
Umpires: K Mahmood (Pakistan) and SH Sarathkumara (Sri Lanka)
Player of the match: Mehboob Alam (Nepal)

== Semifinals ==
1 August 2008
scorecard

Hong Kong; 154/9 (50 overs)	v	Afghanistan; 129 all out (43.4 overs)
Najeeb Amar 29* (41); Hasti Gul 3/23 (10 overs)		Ahmed Shah 36 (69); Nadeem Ahmed 3/14 (7.4 overs)

Hong Kong won by 25 runs
Kinrara Academy Oval, Kuala Lumpur
Umpires: D Ekanayake (Sri Lanka) and BB Pradhan (Nepal)
Player of the match: Najeeb Amar (Hong Kong)

1 Aug 2008
scorecard

Nepal; 166 all out (47.3 overs)	v	United Arab Emirates; 172/4 (45.4 overs)
Shakti Gauchan 35 (67); Khurram Khan 3/20 (6.3 overs)		Khurram Khan 42* (56); Sharad Vesawkar 2/34 (6 overs)

United Arab Emirates won by 6 wickets
Selangor Turf Club, Kuala Lumpur
Umpires: A Rahman (Bangladesh) and SS Hazare (India)
Player of the match: Khurram Khan (United Arab Emirates)

== Playoffs ==
1 August 2008
scorecard

Singapore; 229 all out (49.2 overs)	v	Malaysia; 211 all out (47.2 overs)
Glenn Meyer (75); Dinesh Sockalingham 3/44 (10 overs)		Suhan Alagaratnam (107); B Narender Reddy 3/27 (4.2 overs)

Singapore won by 18 runs
Bayuemas Oval, Kuala Lumpur
Umpires: K Mahmood (Pakistan) and SH Sarathkumara (Sri Lanka)
Player of the match: Suhan Alagaratnam (Malaysia)

- 5th Place Playoff

2 August 2008
scorecard

Saudi Arabia; 164 all out (45 overs)	v	Qatar; 165/1 (22.3 overs)
Suhrab Kilsingatakam 65 (129); Abbas Khan 5/20 (10 overs)		Omer Taj 82* (72); Abid Naseem 1/23

Qatar won by 9 wickets
Royal Military College, Kuala Lumpur
Umpires: SS Hazare (India) and K Mahmood (Pakistan)
Player of the match: Omer Taj (Qatar)

- 9th Place Playoff

2 August 2008
scorecard

Bahrain; 328/6 (50 overs)	v	Kuwait; 229 all out (38.4 overs)
Tahir Dar 85* (51); Mohammad Murad 2/31 (6 overs)		Mohammad Ahsan 66 (75); Halal Abbasi 4/55 (10 overs)

Bahrain won by 99 runs
Selangor Turf Club, Kuala Lumpur
Umpires: A Rahman (Bangladesh) and BB Pradhan (Nepal)
Player of the match: Tahir Dar (Bahrain)

- 7th Place Playoff

2 August 2008
scorecard

Nepal; 210/8 (50 overs)	v	Afghanistan; 213/7 (48.2 overs)
Kanishka Chaugai 43 (63); Aimal Wafa 2/35 (10 overs)		Mohammad Nabi 55 (56); Paras Khadka 3/34 (9 overs)

Afghanistan won by 3 wickets
Bayuemas Oval, Kuala Lumpur
Umpires: SJ Phadkar (India) and T Ahmed (Bangladesh)
Player of the match: Samiullah Shenwari (Afghanistan)

- 3rd Place Playoff

== Final ==
3 August 2008
scorecard

United Arab Emirates; 243/7 (50 overs)	v	Hong Kong; 205/7 (34.1 overs)
Saqib Ali 102 (134); Najeeb Amar 4/61 (10 overs)		Najeeb Amar 100 (80); Shadeep Silva 3/39 (7 overs)

Hong Kong won by 3 wickets (D/L)
Kinrara Academy Oval, Kuala Lumpur
Umpires: A Rahman (Bangladesh) and D Ekanayake (Sri Lanka)
Player of the match: Najeeb Amar (Hong Kong)

- Final.
- Match shortened due to rain; Duckworth-Lewis revised target to win: 203 runs in 36 overs for Hong Kong.

== Final Placings ==
Pos	Team
1st	Hong Kong
2nd	United Arab Emirates
3rd	Afghanistan
4th	Nepal
5th	Singapore
6th	Malaysia
7th	Bahrain
8th	Kuwait
9th	Qatar
10th	Saudi Arabia

== Statistics ==
Most Runs		Most Wickets	
(Qatar) Omer Taj	294	(Malaysia) Dinesh Sockalingham	18
(Malaysia) Suhan Alagaratnam	278	(Qatar) Abbas Khan	12
(Hong Kong) Arshad Ali	268	(Hong Kong) Najeeb Amar	12
(Nepal) Paras Khadka	209	(Bahrain) Halal Abbasi	11
(Hong Kong) Najeeb Amar	195	(Hong Kong) Irfan Ahmed	11
