= 2015 ICC World Cricket League Division Six =

Cricket tournament

2015 World Cricket League Division Six
- Dates: 7 – 13 September 2015
- Administrator: International Cricket Council (ICC)
- Cricket format: 50-over
- Tournament format(s): Round-robin, playoffs
- Host: England
- Champions: Suriname
- Participants: 8
- Matches: 18
- Player of the series: (Suriname) Gavin Singh
- Most runs: (Guernsey) Matthew Stokes (241)
- Most wickets: (Suriname) Muneshwar Patandin (17)

The 2015 ICC World Cricket League Division Six was a limited-overs international cricket tournament that took place in England from 7 to 13 September 2015. The majority of matches were played at grounds in Essex, although two matches took place in Bishop's Stortford, in the neighbouring county of Hertfordshire.

Three bids were received for the event, with Essex being named the host in February 2015, after defeating bids from Guernsey and Vanuatu. Eight teams participated in the tournament, which formed part of the 2012–18 World Cricket League and the qualification process for the 2019 World Cup. Three teams (the Cayman Islands, Guernsey, and Vanuatu) qualified based on their positions in earlier WCL tournaments, while the other five (Botswana, Fiji, Norway, Saudi Arabia, and Suriname) qualified after winning regional qualifiers.

Saudi Arabia failed to arrive for the tournament after they were unable to secure visas for their team. As a result the ICC decided to cancel all of their matches in the tournament, with Group B being reduced to three teams, Cayman Islands, Vanuatu and Norway.

The competition's final was played at the County Ground in Chelmsford, with Suriname defeating Guernsey by six wickets. Both teams were promoted to the 2016 Division Five tournament. However, in March 2016, Suriname withdrew from the Division Five tournament due to an ICC investigation about the eligibility of some of their players. Vanuatu, who finished third overall, were named as their replacement.

== Background ==
=== Qualification ===
Teams that qualified from previous WCL tournaments are:

- Guernsey (5th in 2014 ICC World Cricket League Division Five)
- Cayman Islands (6th in 2014 ICC World Cricket League Division Five)
- Vanuatu (3rd in 2013 ICC World Cricket League Division Six)

Further five teams qualified through regional competitions.

- Suriname (Americas)
- Saudi Arabia (Asia)
- Fiji (East Asia Pacific)
- Botswana (Africa)
- Norway (Europe)

=== Preparation ===
Vanuatu prepared for the tournament by playing against teams in Australia and the Netherlands. In Australia, they played against the Penrith District Cricket Club, a team in the Sydney Grade Cricket competition, while in the Netherlands they played a three-game series against the Dutch national A-team (Netherlands A). They also played Botswana in a friendly at Bentley Cricket Club in Brentwood, Essex. Their previous major tournament was the Pacific Games cricket tournament in July 2015, which they won. Fiji did not field a side at the Pacific Games in favour of focusing on its WCL campaign, and played a series of warm-up games against English club sides.

== Squads ==
| Botswana Coach: Joseph Angara | Cayman Islands Coach: Pearson Best | Guernsey Coach: Nic Pothas | Fiji Coach: Shane Jurgensen |
|---|---|---|---|
| Karabo Motlhanka (c); Dhruv Maisura; Inzimamul Master; Nabil Master; Karabo Modise; Gaolape Mokokwe; James Moses; Rashaad Mosweu; Reginald Nehonde; Adithiya Rangaswamy; Ameer Saiyed; Waseem Tajbhay; Thatayaone Tshose; Russell Withey | Chris Palmer (c); Ryan Bovell; Corey Cato; Darren Cato; Neil Coley; Sacha DeAlwis; Kervin Ebanks; Alessandro Morris; Ian Rotsey; Ramon Sealy; Troy Taylor; Adrian Wright; Conroy Wright; Omar Willis | Jamie Nussbaumer (c); Lucas Barker; Max Ellis; Will Fazakerley; Ben Ferbrache; Dave Hooper; Jordon Martel; Jason Martin; Oliver Newey; Ollie Nightingale; Tom Nightingale; Tim Ravenscroft; Matt Stokes; James Wilkes-Green | Josefa Rika (c); Metuisela Beitaki; Sakiusa Dokosobau; Imran Khan; Riyad Khan; Jikoi Kida; Karan Kumar; Kunaal Kumar; Rabici Lesuma; Viliame Manakitoga; Sekove Ravoka; Giles Smith; Jone Wesele; Viliame Yabaki |
| Norway Coach: Muhammad Haroon | Saudi Arabia | Suriname | Vanuatu Coach: Shane Deitz |
| Raza Iqbal (c); Waqas Ahmed; Damon Crawford; Safir Hayat; Suhail Iftikhar; Wasif Jalal; Sheraz Khalid; Jawad Mir; Ibrahim Mughal; Vithyeswara Sarma; Amad Sheikh; Rahul Shinde; Zeeshan Siddiqui; Prateesh Thangavadivel | Shoaib Ali (c); Abdul Waheed; Arslan Mushtaq; Ibrar-ul-Haq; Imran Azam; Kamran Hadi; Kashif Riaz; Mazhar Abbasi; Mohsin Rajput; Muhammad Afzal; Nadeem Javed; Sajid Saeed; Shahbaz Rasheed; Waqas Ausaf | Mohindra Boodram (c); Wasim Akram; Banerd Bailey; Mohan Balkaran; Hemradj Basropansingh; Yuvraj Dayal; Sauid Drepaul; Arun Gokoel; Vejai Hirlal; Khemraj Jaikaran; Muneshwar Patandin; Shazam Ramjohn; Vishwar Shaw; Gavin Singh | Andrew Mansale (c); Callum Blake; Jelany Chilia; Jonathon Dunn; Worford Kalworai; Trevor Langa; Patrick Matautaava; Nalin Nipiko; Simpson Obed; Joshua Rasu; Apolinaire Stephen; Kenny Tari; Ronald Tari; Niko Unavalu |

== Group stages ==
=== Group A ===
| Team | Pld | W | L | T | NR | Pts | NRR |
|---|---|---|---|---|---|---|---|
| Guernsey | 3 | 3 | 0 | 0 | 0 | 6 | +2.553 |
| Suriname | 3 | 2 | 1 | 0 | 0 | 4 | –0.041 |
| Botswana | 3 | 1 | 2 | 0 | 0 | 2 | –1.224 |
| Fiji | 3 | 0 | 3 | 0 | 0 | 0 | –1.340 |

7 September
10:30
Scorecard

| Botswana; 216 (50 overs) | v | Suriname; 217/5 (42.2 overs) |

Suriname won by 5 wickets
Kelvedon and Feering Cricket Club, Kelvedon, Essex
Player of the match: Gavin Singh (Sur)

- Botswana won the toss and elected to bat.

7 September
10:30
Scorecard

| Guernsey; 287/7 (50 overs) | v | Fiji; 99 (37.5 overs) |

Guernsey won by 188 runs
Castle Park Cricket Ground, Colchester, Essex
Player of the match: Oliver Newey (Gue)

- Fiji won the toss and elected to field.

8 September
10:30
Scorecard

| Fiji; 205 (48.4 overs) | v | Suriname; 207/4 (49.4 overs) |

Suriname won by 6 wickets
Castle Park Cricket Ground, Colchester, Essex
Player of the match: Gavin Singh (Sur)

- Fiji won the toss and elected to bat.

8 September
10:30
Scorecard

| Guernsey; 313/3 (50 overs) | v | Botswana; 162 (43.3 overs) |

Guernsey won by 151 runs
Frinton-on-Sea Cricket Club, Frinton-on-Sea, Essex
Player of the match: Matthew Stokes (Gue)

- Guernsey won the toss and elected to bat.

10 September
10:30
Scorecard

| Fiji; 211 (48.2 overs) | v | Botswana; 214/8 (48.4 overs) |

Botswana won by 2 wickets
Coggeshall Cricket Club, Coggeshall, Essex

- Botswana won the toss and elected to field.

10 September
10:30
Scorecard

| Guernsey; 239 (50 overs) | v | Suriname; 195 (47 overs) |

Guernsey won by 44 runs
Halstead Cricket Club, Halstead, Essex
Player of the match: Dave Hooper (Gue)

- Suriname won the toss and elected to field.

=== Group B ===
| Team | Pld | W | L | T | NR | Pts | NRR |
|---|---|---|---|---|---|---|---|
| Vanuatu | 2 | 2 | 0 | 0 | 0 | 4 | +0.667 |
| Norway | 2 | 1 | 1 | 0 | 0 | 2 | –0.140 |
| Cayman Islands | 2 | 0 | 2 | 0 | 0 | 0 | –0.598 |
| Saudi Arabia | 0 | 0 | 0 | 0 | 0 | 0 | 0 |

7 September
10:30
Scorecard

| Cayman Islands; 154 (48.1 overs) | v | Vanuatu; 160/6 (40 overs) |

Vanuatu won by 4 wickets
Frinton-on-Sea Cricket Club,
Frinton-on-Sea, Essex
Player of the match: Andrew Mansale (Van)

- Cayman Islands won the toss and elected to bat.

7 September
10:30
Scorecard

| Norway | v | Saudi Arabia |

Match cancelled
Coggeshall, Essex

- Saudi Arabia failed to arrive in the country in time for the match.

8 September
10:30
Scorecard

| Cayman Islands | v | Saudi Arabia |

Match cancelled
Kelvedon, Essex

8 September
10:30
Scorecard

| Norway; 184/8 (50 overs) | v | Vanuatu; 188/6 (46 overs) |

Vanuatu won by 4 wickets
West Mersea Cricket Club,
West Mersea, Essex
Player of the match: Joshua Rasu (Van)

- Norway won the toss and elected to bat.

10 September
10:30
Scorecard

| Norway; 252/8 (50 overs) | v | Cayman Islands; 244/9 (50 overs) |

Norway won by 8 runs
Kelvedon and Feering Cricket Club, Kelvedon, Essex
Player of the match: Raza Iqbal (Nor)

- Norway won the toss and elected to bat.

10 September
10:30
Scorecard

| Vanuatu | v | Saudi Arabia |

Match cancelled
Colchester, Essex

== Crossover matches ==
=== 5th-place semi-finals ===
11 September
10:30
Scorecard

| Botswana | v | Saudi Arabia |

Match cancelled
Feering, Essex

- Botswana qualified for the 5th-place playoff.

11 September
10:30
Scorecard

| Fiji; 185 (47.4 overs) | v | Cayman Islands; 95 (34.5 overs) |

Fiji won by 90 runs
Drapers Farm Sports Club, Maldon, Essex
Player of the match: Kunaal Kumar (Fij)

- Cayman Islands won the toss and elected to field.
- Fiji qualified for the 5th-place playoff.

=== Main semi-finals ===
11 September
10:30
Scorecard

| Guernsey; 173 (48.4 overs) | v | Norway; 151 (49.1 overs) |

Guernsey won by 22 runs
Frinton-on-Sea Cricket Club, Frinton-on-Sea, Essex
Player of the match: Dave Hooper (Gue)

- Guernsey won the toss and elected to bat.
- Guernsey qualified for the final, Norway for the 3rd-place playoff.

11 September
10:30
Scorecard

| Vanuatu; 140 (36.4 overs) | v | Suriname; 141/6 (46.3 overs) |

Suriname won by 4 wickets
Coggeshall Cricket Club, Coggeshall, Essex
Player of the match: Muneshwar Patandin (Sur)

- Suriname won the toss and elected to field.
- Suriname qualified for the final, Vanuatu for the 3rd-place playoff.

== Playoffs ==
=== 7th-place playoff ===
13 September
10:30
Scorecard

| Saudi Arabia | v | Cayman Islands |

Match cancelled
Bishop's Stortford, Hertfordshire

- No toss
- Cayman Islands get 7th place as a result

=== 5th-place playoff ===
13 September
10:30
Scorecard

| Fiji; 235/9 (50 overs) | v | Botswana; 102 (27.3 overs) |

Fiji won by 133 runs
Cricket Field Lane, Bishop's Stortford, Hertfordshire
Player of the match: Jone Wesele (Fij)

- Botswana won the toss and elected to field.

=== 3rd-place playoff ===
13 September
10:30
Scorecard

| Vanuatu; 309/3 (50 overs) | v | Norway; 159/8 (36 overs) |

Vanuatu won by 91 runs (DLS method)
Castle Park Cricket Ground, Colchester, Essex
Player of the match: Jonathon Dunn (Van)

- Norway won the toss and elected to field.
- Norway's target was 251 runs in 36 overs.

=== Final ===
13 September
10:30
Scorecard

| Guernsey; 237 (49.5 overs) | v | Suriname; 239/4 (45.1 overs) |

Suriname won by 6 wickets
County Ground, Chelmsford, Essex
Player of the match: Gavin Singh (Sur)

- Suriname won the toss and elected to field.

== Statistics ==
=== Most runs ===
The top five runscorers are included in this table, ranked by runs scored, then by batting average, then alphabetically by surname.

| Player | Team | Runs | Inns | Avg | Highest | 100s | 50s |
|---|---|---|---|---|---|---|---|
| Matthew Stokes | Guernsey | 241 | 5 | 60.25 | 135* | 1 | 0 |
| Joshua Rasu | Vanuatu | 222 | 4 | 55.50 | 95 | 0 | 2 |
| Oliver Newey | Guernsey | 210 | 5 | 52.50 | 129* | 1 | 0 |
| Suhail Iftikhar | Norway | 207 | 4 | 51.75 | 71 | 0 | 2 |
| Gavin Singh | Suriname | 189 | 5 | 63.00 | 64 | 0 | 3 |

Source: ESPNcricinfo

=== Most wickets ===
The top five wicket takers are listed in this table, ranked by wickets taken and then by bowling average.

| Player | Team | Overs | Wkts | Ave | SR | Econ | BBI |
|---|---|---|---|---|---|---|---|
| Muneshwar Patandin | Suriname | 45.3 | 17 | 11.29 | 16.0 | 4.21 | 5/18 |
| Gavin Singh | Suriname | 46.0 | 13 | 12.00 | 21.2 | 3.39 | 5/42 |
| Raza Iqbal | Norway | 37.4 | 10 | 15.30 | 22.6 | 4.06 | 5/48 |
| Jikoi Kida | Fiji | 41.2 | 9 | 20.33 | 27.5 | 4.42 | 3/35 |
| Imran Khan | Fiji | 29.0 | 8 | 15.12 | 21.7 | 4.17 | 2/14 |

Source: ESPNcricinfo

== Final standings ==
| Position | Team | Status |
|---|---|---|
| 1 | Suriname (Note: Suriname withdrew from Division Five and Vanuatu was invited to replace them.) | Promoted to 2016 ICC World Cricket League Division Five |
| 2 | Guernsey | Promoted to 2016 ICC World Cricket League Division Five |
| 3 | Vanuatu (Note: Invited to Division Five) | |
| 4 | Norway | |
| 5 | Fiji | |
| 6 | Botswana | |
| 7 | Cayman Islands | |
| 8 | Saudi Arabia [c] | |

== Notes ==
. c. ^ Saudi Arabia failed to arrive in the country in time and withdrew.
