= Mosweu =

Mosweu is a surname of Botswanan origin. Notable people with the surname include:

- Golekane Mosweu (born 1948), Botswana footballer
- Rashaad Mosweu (born 1998), Botswana cricketer
- Reuben Mosweu, Botswana footballer
