= Osita =

Osita may refer to:

== People ==
=== Given name ===
- Osita Agwuna (1921–2017), Nigerian activist
- Osita Chidoka (born 1971), Nigerian politician and public servant
- Osita Henry Chikere (born 1991), Nigerian footballer
- Osita Iheme (born 1982), Nigerian actor
- Osita Izunaso (born 1966), Nigerian politician
- Osita Nebo (born 1952), Nigerian academic
- Osita Ogbu (born 1957), Nigerian politician
- Osita Okeagu (born 1978), Nigerian athlete
- Osita Onwuzulike (born 1984), Nigerian cricketer
- Chief Stephen Osita Osadebe (1936–2007), Nigerian singer-songwriter

=== Surname ===
- Echendu Osita (born 1987), Nigerian footballer
- Egbo Osita (born 1988), Nigerian footballer

=== Stage name ===
- Koguma, Japanese professional wrestler who also competed as Osita

== Other ==
- 1837 Osita, an asteroid
- Ostia Antica, a large archaeological site of a harbour city near Rome, Italy
