= 2009 ACC Twenty20 Cup =

- Administrator: Asian Cricket Council
- Cricket format: Twenty20
- Tournament format: Group Stage with Finals
- Host: United Arab Emirates
- Champions: Afghanistan (2nd title)
- Participants: 12
- Matches: 38
- Most runs: 268 Khalid Butt (Kuwait)
- Most wickets: 16 Mohammad Nabi (Afghanistan)
- Official website: Tournament Site

The 2009 ACC Twenty20 Cup was played between 22 and 30 November 2009 in the United Arab Emirates.

The twelve competing teams were: Afghanistan, Bahrain, China, Hong Kong, Kuwait, Malaysia, Nepal, Oman, Qatar, Saudi Arabia, Singapore and the UAE.

Afghanistan defeated the United Arab Emirates in the final to win the tournament for the second time, following their joint victory with Oman in 2007. In the third place playoff Oman defeated Kuwait, meaning they will join Afghanistan and the United Arab Emirates for the cricket tournament at the 2010 Asian Games, along with the national teams of Bangladesh, China, India, Pakistan and Sri Lanka.

== Group stage ==
=== Group A ===
Team	M	W	L	Pts	NRR
Afghanistan	5	5	0	10	4.459
Arab Emirates	5	4	1	8	3.809
Singapore	5	3	2	6	0.106
Saudi Arabia	5	2	3	4	−0.991
Hong Kong	5	1	4	2	−0.808
China	5	0	5	0	−6.226

=== Results ===
22 November
(scorecard)

China; 37 (17.5 overs)	v	Afghanistan; 41/1 (4 overs)
Song Yangyang 7 (15); Hameed Hasan 4/5 (4 overs)		Karim Sadiq 26* (12); Wang Lei 1/16 (2 overs)

Afghanistan won by 9 wickets
Al Dhaid Cricket Village, Al Dhaid
Umpires: Farid Malik & Iftikhar Ali
Player of the match: Hameed Hasan (Afghanistan)

22 November
(scorecard)

Hong Kong; 132–6 (20 overs)	v	Saudi Arabia; 135–9 (19.3 overs)
Roy Lamsam 53 (53); Hammad Saeed 2/19 (4 overs)		Shoaib Ali 29 (22); Irfan Ahmed 4/24 (2 overs)

Saudi Arabia won by 1 wicket
Sheikh Zayed Cricket Stadium, Abu Dhabi
Umpires: Buddhi Pradhan & Sarika Prasad

22 November
(scorecard)

United Arab Emirates; 219–5 (20 overs)	v	Singapore; 157 all out (19.3 overs)
Amjad Javed 115 (58); Pramodh Raja 2/25 (4 overs)		Buddhika Mendis 51 (35); Fayyaz Ahmed 3/47 (4 overs)

United Arab Emirates won by 62 runs
Sharjah Cricket Association Stadium, Sharjah
Umpires: AR Srinivasan & Riyaz Chowdry
Player of the match: Amjad Javed (UAE)

23 November
(scorecard)

Singapore; 96 all out (17.5 overs)	v	Afghanistan; 100–2 (12 overs)
Chetan Suryawanshi 18 (8); Hameed Hasan 3/5 (4 overs)		Karim Khan 68 (39); Mulewa Dharmichand 2/14 (2 overs)

Afghanistan won by 8 wickets
Sharjah Cricket Association Stadium, Sharjah
Umpires: AR Srinivasan & Sanjay Gurung

23 November
(scorecard)

Saudi Arabia; 155–6 (20 overs)	v	China; 100–7 (20 overs)
Mohammad Abdullah 63 (49); Li Jian 3/19 (2.3 overs)		Wang Lei 25 (17); Mohammad Nadeem 3/18 (4 overs)

Saudi Arabia won by 55 runs
Sharjah Cricket Association Stadium, Sharjah
Umpires: AR Srinivasan & Sanjay Gurung
Player of the match: Mohammad Abdullah (Saudi Arabia)

23 November
(scorecard)

United Arab Emirates; 137–9 (20 overs)	v	Hong Kong; 110–9 (20 overs)
Mohammad Iqbal 42 (26); Moner Ahmed 2/13 (4 overs)		Hussain Butt 37 (31); Ahmed Raza 4/8 (4 overs)

United Arab Emirates won by 27 runs
Al Dhaid Cricket Village, Al Dhaid
Umpires: Riaz Chaudhry & Vinay Kumar Jha
Player of the match: Ahmed Raza (UAE)

24 November
(scorecard)

Afghanistan; 222–5 (20 overs)	v	Hong Kong; 102–9 (20 overs)
Mohammad Shahzad 74 (46); Najeeb Amar 2/44 (4 overs)		Hussain Butt 17 (17); Samiullah Shenwari 2/11 (4 overs)

Afghanistan won by 120 runs
Sheikh Zayed Cricket Stadium, Abu Dhabi
Umpires: Riaz Chaudhry & Vinay Kumar Jha
Player of the match: Mohammad Nabi (Afghanistan)

24 November
(scorecard)

Saudi Arabia; 101–6 (20 overs)	v	United Arab Emirates; 102–1 (11 overs)
Mohammad Nadeem 29 (32); Moiz Shahid 2/3 (3 overs)		Mohammad Iqbal 71 (37); Hussain Anwar 1/30 (4 overs)

United Arab Emirates won by 9 wickets
Al Dhaid Cricket Village, Al Dhaid
Umpires: Buddhi Pradhan & Ashwin Rana
Player of the match: Mohammad Iqbal (UAE)

24 November
(scorecard)

Singapore; 225–6 (20 overs)	v	China; 93–7 (20 overs)
Chetan Suryawanshi 102 (38); Zhang Peng 4/19 (3 overs)		Wang Dianyi 34 (39); Mulewa Dharmichand 3/12 (2 overs)

Singapore won by 132 runs
Sheikh Zayed Cricket Stadium, Abu Dhabi
Umpires: Riaz Chaudhry & Vinay Kumar Jha
Player of the match: Chetan Suryawanshi (Singapore)

26 November
(scorecard)

Saudi Arabia; 72 all out (18.5 overs)	v	Afghanistan; 73–1 (8 overs)
Mohammad Abdullah 15 (22); Mohammad Nabi 4/7 (2.5 overs)		Mohammad Shahzad 31 (15); Hammad Saeed 1/12 (3 overs)

Afghanistan won by 9 wickets
Al Dhaid Cricket Village, Al Dhaid
Umpires: Farid Malik & Vinay Kumar Jha
Player of the match: Mohammad Nabi (Afghanistan)

26 November
(scorecard)

Hong Kong; 164–8 (20 overs)	v	Singapore; 165–9 (19.5 overs)
Hussain Butt 35 (29); Mulewa Dharmichand 2/33 (4 overs)		Chetan Suryawanshi 27 (59); Moner Ahmed 4/30 (4 overs)

Singapore won by 1 wickets
Al Dhaid Cricket Village, Al Dhaid
Umpires: Farid Malik & Vinay Kumar Jha
Player of the match: Chetan Suryawanshi (Singapore)

26 November
(scorecard)

United Arab Emirates; 236–5 (20 overs)	v	China; 27 all out (15.1 overs)
Khurram Khan 64 (30); Li Jian 2/21 (2 overs)		Song Yangyang 5 (10); Ahmed Raza 3/2 (2 overs)

United Arab Emirates won by 209 runs
Sheikh Zayed Cricket Stadium, Abu Dhabi
Umpires: Sanjay Gurung & AR Srinivasan

28 November
(scorecard)

United Arab Emirates; 144–8 (20 overs)	v	Afghanistan; 145–9 (20 overs)
Arfan Hyder 34 (25); Hameed Hasan 2/18 (4 overs)		Karim Khan 34 (23); Qasim Zubair 3/26 (4 overs)

Afghanistan won by 1 wicket
Sheikh Zayed Cricket Stadium, Abu Dhabi
Umpires: Sarika Prasad & Sanjay Gurung

28 November
(scorecard)

Singapore; 181–7 (20 overs)	v	Saudi Arabia; 179–8 (20 overs)
Chaminda Ruwan 54 (39); Shoaib Ali 2/23 (4 overs)		Kashif Riaz 55 (32); Buddhika Mendis 2/19 (4 overs)

Singapore won by 3 runs
Al Dhaid Cricket Village, Al Dhaid
Umpires: Farid Malik & Ashwin Rana
Player of the match: Buddhika Mendis (Singapore)

28 November
(scorecard)

Hong Kong; 124–8 (20 overs)	v	China; 49 all out (17.5 overs)
Roy Lamsam 23 (21); Wang Lei 3/15 (4 overs)		Zhang Yufei 9 (13); Nadeem Ahmed 3/10 (3 overs)

Hong Kong won by 75 runs
Sharjah Cricket Association Stadium, Sharjah
Umpires: Buddhi Pradhan & MV Ramesh
Player of the match: Wang Lei (China) & Nadeem Ahmed (Hong Kong)

=== Group B ===
Team	M	W	L	Pts	NRR
Oman	5	5	0	10	2.561
Kuwait	5	3	2	6	1.445
Nepal	5	3	2	6	−0.018
Malaysia	5	3	2	6	−0.094
Qatar	5	1	4	2	−1.095
Bahrain	5	0	5	0	−2.961

=== Results ===
22 November
(scorecard)

Oman; 219–5 (20 overs)	v	Bahrain; 111–7 (20 overs)
Zeeshan Ahmed 55 (35); Sarfraz Ahmed 2/43 (4 overs)		Aamar Shahzad 43* (47); Zeeshan Ahmed 2/22 (4 overs)

Oman won by 108 runs
Sheikh Zayed Cricket Stadium, Abu Dhabi
Umpires: Buddi Pradhan & Sarika Prasad
Player of the match: Zeeshan Ahmed (Oman)

22 November
(scorecard)

Nepal; 112–7 (20 overs)	v	Malaysia; 113–4 (17.2 overs)
Mehboob Alam 31 (34); Dinesh Muthuraman 2/17 (4 overs)		Ahmad Faiz 40* (34); Shakti Gauchan 1/15 (3 overs)

Malaysia won by 6 wickets
Sharjah Cricket Association Stadium, Sharjah
Umpires: M Asif & Thassim Junkeer

22 November
(scorecard)

Kuwait; 195–5 (20 overs)	v	Qatar; 130 all out (17.5 overs)
Saad Khalid 53* (34); Rusharat Ali 2/29 (4 overs)		Sajjad Ahmed 29 (19); Azmatullah Mohammed 3/15 (4 overs)

Kuwait won by 65 runs
Al Dhaid Cricket Village, Al Dhaid
Umpires: Farid Malik & Iftikhar Ali
Player of the match: Azmatullah Mohammed (Kuwait)

23 November
(scorecard)

Qatar; 178–8 (20 overs)	v	Oman; 179–5 (18.3 overs)
Tamoor Sajjad 62 (38); Awal Khan 3/50 (4 overs)		Adnan Ilyas 75 (40); Ameenullah Khan 1/19 (2 overs)

Oman won by 5 wickets
Sheikh Zayed Cricket Stadium, Abu Dhabi
Umpires: Ashwin Rana & Sarika Prasad
Player of the match: Adnan Ilyas (Oman)

23 November
(scorecard)

Malaysia; 218–4 (20 overs)	v	Bahrain; 134–9 (20 overs)
Damith Warusavithana 51 (33); Huzaifa Akram 1/29 (4 overs)		Mohammad Ashraf 63 (41); Suresh Navaratnam 3/39 (4 overs)

Malaysia won by 84 runs
Al Dhaid Cricket Village, Al Dhaid
Umpires: Riaz Chaudhry & Vinay Kumar Jha
Player of the match: Thusara Kodikara (Malaysia)

23 November
(scorecard)

Kuwait; 123 all out (19.1 overs)	v	Nepal; 123–7 (20 overs)
Hisham Mirza 34 (20); Dipendra Chaudhary 4/11 (3 overs)		Mehboob Alam 32 (33); Khalid Yameen 3/15 (4 overs)

Match tied
Sheikh Zayed Cricket Stadium, Abu Dhabi
Umpires: Ashwin Rana & Sarika Prasad

- Nepal won the bowl-out 3–2

24 November
(scorecard)

Oman; 112–9 (20 overs)	v	Nepal; 100 all out (19.1 overs)
Ghazanfar Iqbal 37 (31); Dipendra Chaudhary 4/19 (4 overs)		Basanta Regmi 26 (32); Hemin Desai 3/14 (4 overs)

Oman won by 12 runs
Sharjah Cricket Association Stadium, Sharjah
Umpires: Iftikhar Ali & MV Ramesh
Player of the match: Hemin Desai (Oman)

24 November
(scorecard)

Qatar; 164–6 (20 overs)	v	Bahrain; 161–6 (20 overs)
Rusharat Ali 44* (20); Mirza Rizwan 2/20 (4 overs)		Nouman Yousuf 41 (43); Sardar Badshah 2/26 (4 overs)

Qatar won by 3 runs
Sharjah Cricket Association Stadium, Sharjah
Umpires: Iftikhar Ali & MV Ramesh
Player of the match: Rusharat Ali (Qatar)

24 November
(scorecard)

Kuwait; 209–7 (20 overs)	v	Malaysia; 112 all out (16.2 overs)
Saad Khalid 79 (39); Thushara Kodikara 2/15 (4 overs)		Rakesh Madhavan 33 (30); Saad Khalid 4/10 (3.2 overs)

Kuwait won by 97 runs
Al Dhaid Cricket Village, Al Dhaid
Umpires: Buddhi Pradhan & Ashwin Rana
Player of the match: Saad Khalid (Kuwait)

26 November
(scorecard)

Oman; 197–5 (20 overs)	v	Malaysia; 162–8 (20 overs)
Hemin Desai 67 (27); Suresh Navaratnam 2/50 (4 overs)		Suresh Navaratnam 44 (25); Adnan Ilyas 3/23 (3 overs)

Oman won by 35 runs
Sharjah Cricket Association Stadium, Sharjah
Umpires: Iftikhar Ali & MV Ramesh
Player of the match: Adnan Ilyas (Oman)

26 November
(scorecard)

Bahrain; 174–6 (20 overs)	v	Kuwait; 175–1 (12.3 overs)
Ashraf Mughal 61 (41); Sanal Govind 2/26 (3 overs)		Khalid Butt 142 (53); Huzaifa Akram 1/34 (3.3 overs)

Kuwait won by 9 wickets
Sheikh Zayed Cricket Stadium, Abu Dhabi
Umpires: Sanjay Gurung & AR Srinivasan
Player of the match: Khalid Butt (Kuwait)

26 November
(scorecard)

Qatar; 96 all out (19 overs)	v	Nepal; 97–4 (18 overs)
Irfan Hussain 32 (39); Basanta Regmi 3/11 (4 overs)		Gyanendra Malla 39 (44); Ameenullah Khan 2/18 (3 overs)

Nepal won by 6 wickets
Sharjah Cricket Association Stadium, Sharjah
Umpires: Iftikhar Ali & MV Ramesh
Player of the match: Basanta Regmi & Shakti Gauchan (both Nepal)

28 November
(scorecard)

Malaysia; 182–5 (20 overs)	v	Qatar; 166–7 (20 overs)
Suhan Kumar 85* (47); Ameenullah Khan 3/23 (4 overs)		Habib Zada 52 (44); Dinesh Muthuraman 3/29 (4 overs)

Malaysia won by 16 runs
Sheikh Zayed Cricket Stadium, Abu Dhabi
Umpires: Sarika Prasad & Sanjay Gurung

28 November
(scorecard)

Bahrain; 157–8 (20 overs)	v	Nepal; 159–3 (18 overs)
Haroon Nasir 53 (36); Binod Das 3/28 (4 overs)		Gyanendra Malla 48 (30); Sameer Yousuf 2/43 (4 overs)

Nepal won by 7 wickets
Al Dhaid Cricket Village, Al Dhaid
Umpires: Ashwin Rana & Farid Malik
Player of the match: Paras Khadka (Nepal)

28 November
(scorecard)

Oman; 217–4 (20 overs)	v	Kuwait; 131 all out (19.3 overs)
Hemin Desai 63 (28); Azmatullah 2/24 (4 overs)		Sanal Govind 32 (17); Amir Ali 3/14 (4 overs)

Oman won by 86 runs
Sharjah Cricket Association Stadium, Sharjah
Umpires: Buddhi Pradhan & MV Ramesh
Player of the match: Hemin Desai (Oman)

== Semi-finals and Playoffs ==
=== 11th/12th place playoff ===
29 November
(scorecard)

Bahrain; 196–4 (20 overs)	v	China; 103–3 (20 overs)
Ashraf Mughal 86 (59); Wang Jing 1/26 (2 overs)		Song Yangyang 34 (52); Numan Yousaf 1/12 (1.3 overs)

Bahrain won by 93 runs
Sheikh Zayed Cricket Stadium, Abu Dhabi
Umpires: Iftikhar Ali & MV Ramesh
Player of the match: Ashraf Mughal (Bahrain)

=== 9th/10th place playoff ===
29 November
(scorecard)

Hong Kong; 148–9 (20 overs)	v	Qatar; 149–3 (16.3 overs)
Hussain Butt 64* (46); Sajjad Ahmed 3/27 (4 overs)		Umer Taj 50 (35); Moner Ahmed 2/24 (3.3 overs)

Qatar won by 7 wickets
Al Dhaid Cricket Village, Al Dhaid
Umpires: Riaz Chaudhry & Sanjay Gurung
Player of the match: Sajjad Ahmed (Qatar)

=== 7th/8th place playoff ===
29 November
(scorecard)

Malaysia; 201–7 (20 overs)	v	Saudi Arabia; 196–8 (20 overs)
Damith Warusavithana 62 (35); Shafiq Ahmed 3/28 (4 overs)		Mohammad Nadeem 36 (21); Nik Arifin 3/34 (4 overs)

Malaysia won by 5 runs
Sheikh Zayed Cricket Stadium, Abu Dhabi
Umpires: Iftikhar Ali & Vinay Kumar Jha
Player of the match: Damith Warusavithana (Malaysia)

=== 5th/6th place playoff ===
29 November
(scorecard)

Singapore; 89 all out (19.4 overs)	v	Nepal; 90–1 (14.2 overs)
Saad Janjua 25 (22); Binod Das 3/21 (3.4 overs)		Dipendra Chaudhary 49* (40 overs); Saad Janjua 1/13 (3 overs)

Nepal won by 9 wickets
Sharjah Cricket Association Stadium, Sharjah
Umpires: Farid Malik & Ashwin Rana
Player of the match: Dipendra Chaudhary (Nepal)

=== Semi-finals ===
29 November
(scorecard)

Kuwait; 115 all out (17.1 overs)	v	Afghanistan; 116–2 (16.3 overs)
Hisham Mirza 33 (28); Hameed Hasan 3/24 (4 overs)		Nowroz Mangal 51* (48); Mohumed Ali 2/25 (3.4 overs)

Afghanistan won by 8 wickets
Sharjah Cricket Association Stadium, Sharjah
Umpires: AR Srinivasan & Buddhi Pradhan
Player of the match: Nowroz Mangal (Afghanistan)

29 November
(scorecard)

Oman; 50 all out (15.1 overs)	v	United Arab Emirates; 51–4 (8.1 overs)
Awal Khan 12* (29); Moiz Shahid 5/20 (4 overs)		Arfan Haider 19 (15); Awal Khan 2/32 (4 overs)

United Arab Emirates won by 6 wickets
Al Dhaid Cricket Village, Al Dhaid
Player of the match: Moiz Shahid (UAE)

== 3rd place playoff and Final ==
=== 3rd/4th place playoff ===
30 November
(scorecard)

Oman; 171–9 (20 overs)	v	Kuwait; 148 all out (18.4)
Vaibhav Wategaonkar 50 (30); Azmatullah Mohammed 4/14 (4 overs)		Saad Khalid 44 (30); Awal Khan 4/45 (3.4 overs)

Oman won by 23 runs
Sheikh Zayed Cricket Stadium, Abu Dhabi
Umpires: Vinay Kumar Jha & Sanjay Gurung

=== Final ===
30 November
(scorecard)

Afghanistan; 196–8 (20 overs)	v	United Arab Emirates; 112 all out (14.3 overs)
Mohammad Nabi 73 (38); Mohammad Tauqir 3/29 (3 overs)		Naeemuddin Aslam 37 (30); Mohammad Nabi 4/7 (1.3 overs)

Afghanistan won by 84 runs
Sheikh Zayed Cricket Stadium, Abu Dhabi
Umpires: Buddhi Pradhan & Sarika Prasad
Player of the match: Mohammad Nabi (Afghanistan)

== Final standings ==
Pos	Team	Promotion
1st	Afghanistan	Will take part in the 2010 Asian Games
2nd	United Arab Emirates	Will take part in the 2010 Asian Games
3rd	Oman	Will take part in the 2010 Asian Games
4th	Kuwait	
5th	Nepal	
6th	Singapore	
7th	Malaysia	
8th	Saudi Arabia	
9th	Qatar	
10th	Hong Kong	
11th	Bahrain	
12th	China	2010 Asian Games hosts

== Statistics ==
Most Runs		Most Wickets	
(Kuwait) Khalid Butt	268	(Afghanistan) Mohammad Nabi	16
(Oman) Adnan Ilyas	255	(Afghanistan) Hameed Hasan	14
(Bahrain) Ashraf Mughal	236	(Oman) Awal Khan	13
(Kuwait) Saad Khalid	208	(United Arab Emirates) Ahmed Raza	12
(Singapore) Chetan Suryawanshi	204	(United Arab Emirates) Moiz Shahid	12

== See also ==
- ACC Trophy
