= Tshireletso =

Tshireletso is a surname. Notable people with the surname include:

- Botlogile Tshireletso, Motswana politician
- Leutlwetse Tshireletso (born 1985), Motswana footballer and coach
- Lemponye Tshireletso (born 1984), Motswana footballer
