= Shahzad Siddique =

Bahraini cricketer (born 1987)

Personal information
- Born: 27 April 1987 (age 39)

International information
- National side: Bahrain
- Source: Cricinfo, 15 July 2015

Shahzad Siddique (born 27 April 1987) is a cricketer who plays for the Bahrain national cricket team. He played in the 2013 ICC World Cricket League Division Six tournament.
