= Zafar Zaheer =

Bahraini cricketer (born 1974)

Personal information
- Born: 2 November 1974 (age 52)

International information
- National side: Bahrain
- Source: Cricinfo, 15 July 2015

Zafar Zaheer (born 2 November 1974) is a cricketer who plays for the Bahrain national cricket team. He played in the 2013 ICC World Cricket League Division Six tournament.
