= Echendu =

Echendu is a given name. Notable people with the name include:

- Echendu Adiele (1978–2011), Nigerian footballer
- Echendu Osita (born 1987), Nigerian footballer
