= 2014 ACC Elite League =

ACC Elite League 2014
- Administrator: Asian Cricket Council
- Cricket format: 50 overs per side
- Tournament format: League system
- Host: Singapore
- Champions: Singapore (1st title)
- Participants: 6
- Matches: 15

The first tournament of second division of ACC Premier League was held in Singapore between 7–13 June 2014. Singapore won the tournament and qualified for 2016 ACC Premier League. Saudi Arabia finishing second qualified for 2015 ICC World Cricket League Division Six.

== Points Table ==
Team	Pld	W	L	T	NR	Pts	NRR
Singapore	5	4	1	0	0	8	+3.243
Saudi Arabia	5	4	1	0	0	8	+2.150
Kuwait	5	4	1	0	0	8	+1.797
Maldives	5	2	3	0	0	4	-1.534
Bahrain	5	1	4	0	0	2	-0.797
Bhutan	5	0	5	0	0	0	-4.679

=== Matches ===
7 June
9:30 AM

Bhutan; 109 (47.0)	v	Maldives; 101-7 (27.0)
Mihusan Hamid 3-15		Ahmed Hasan 36

Maldives won by 3 wickets (D/L method)
Kallang Ground
Player of the match: (Maldives) Mihusan Hamid

- Bhutan won the toss and chose to bat.
- Rain Delay – Target revised to 101 from 39 overs (D/L method

.

7 June
9:30 AM

Bahrain; 147 (39.4)	v	Kuwait; 148-6 (31.2)
Adnan Butt 35; Saad Khalid 5-26		Hisham Mirza 47

Kuwait won by 5 wickets
Singapore Cricket Club Ground
Player of the match: (Kuwait) Saad Khalid

- Kuwait won the toss and chose to field.

7 June
9:30 AM

Singapore; 149 (42.4)	v	Saudi Arabia; 150-7 (40.5)
Andre de Lange 45; Mohammad Nadeem 3-19		Shahbaz Raseed 66; Amjad Mahboob 3-19

Saudi Arabia won by 3 wickets
Indian Association Ground
Player of the match: (Saudi Arabia) Shahbaz Raseed

- Saudi Arabia won the toss and chose to field.
- Rain Delay – Match reduced 46 overs a side.

8 June
9:30 AM

Singapore; 216 (49.4)	v	Kuwait; 196 (38.4)
Chaminda Ruwan 52; Hisam Mirza 3-42		Mohammad Irfan 72; Abhiraj Singh 5-42

Singapore won by 20 runs
Kallang Ground
Player of the match: (Singapore) Abhiraj Singh

- Kuwait won the toss and chose to field.

8 June
9:30 AM

Saudi Arabia; 438-4 (50.0)	v	Bhutan; 138 (41.5)
Hammad Saeed 181		Sonam Tobgay 55; I. Haq 3-7

Saudi Arabia won by 300 runs
Singapore Cricket Club Ground
Player of the match: (Saudi Arabia) Hammad Saeed

- Saudi Arabia won the toss and chose to bat.

8 June
9:30 AM

Bahrain; 130 (47.3)	v	Maldives; 131-2 (39.2)
M. Baig 35; Mohamed Mahfooz 4-16		Abdullah Shahid 57

Maldives won by 8 wickets
Indian Association Ground
Player of the match: (Maldives) Mohamed Mahfooz

- Bahrain won the toss and chose to bat.

10 June
9:30 AM

Kuwait; 153 (48.1)	v	Maldives; 96 (27.5)
Ibrahim Hasan 3-21		Mohamed Rishwan 39; Faizan Ali 3-21

Kuwait won by 57 runs
Kallang Ground
Player of the match: (Kuwait) Faizan Ali

- Maldives won the toss and chose to field.

10 June
9:30 AM

Singapore; 388-9 (50.0)	v	Bhutan; 106 (45.3)
Rezza Gaznai 96; Tanzin Wanchuk 6-73		Amjad Mahboob 3-17

Singapore won by 282 runs
Singapore Cricket Club Ground
Player of the match: Rezza Gaznai

- Singapore won the toss and chose to bat.

10 June
9:30 AM

Bahrain; 159 (42.5)	v	Saudi Arabia; 161-3 (35.3)
Mirza Yaqoob 51; I. Haq 4-42		Abdul Waheed 75*

Saudi Arabia won by 7 wickets
Indian Association Ground
Player of the match: (Saudi Arabia) Abdul Waheed

- Saudi Arabia won the toss and chose to field.

11 June
9:30 AM

Bahrain; 86 (29.5)	v	Singapore; 92-2 (6.5)
Mulewa Dharmichand 4-10		Chetan Suryawanshi 37*

Singapore won by 8 wickets
Kallang Ground
Player of the match: (Singapore) Mulewa Dharmichand

- Singapore won the toss and chose to field.

11 June
9:30 AM

Bhutan; 169-7 (50.0)	v	Kuwait; 173-4 (13.4)
Manoj Adhikari 39		Mohamad Ghulam 59*

Kuwait won by 6 wickets
Singapore Cricket Club Ground
Player of the match: (Kuwait) Mohammed Irfan

- Bhutan won the toss and chose to bat.

11 June
9:30 AM

Saudi Arabia; 347-3 (50.0)	v	Maldives; 159-7 (50.0)
Shahbaz Raseed 130*		Mohamed Azzam 44

Saudi Arabia won by 158 runs
Indian Association Ground
Player of the match: (Saudi Arabia) Shahbaz Raseed

- Maldives won the toss and chose to field.

13 June
9:30 AM

Saudi Arabia; 205-7 (50.0)	v	Kuwait; 206-5 (24.4)
A. Saleem 59; Saad Khalid 3-50		Mohammed Irfan 129*

Kuwait won by 5 wickets
Kallang Ground
Player of the match: (Kuwait) Mohammed Irfan

- Kuwait won the toss and chose to field.

13 June
9:30 AM

Maldives; 73 (27.0)	v	Singapore; 76-2 (6.3)
Mulewa Dharmichand 3-3		Arjun Murteja 30

Singapore won by 8 wickets
Singapore Cricket Club Ground
Player of the match: Abhiraj Singh

- Singapore won the toss and chose to field.

13 June
9:30 AM

Bahrain; 317-8 (50.0)	v	Bhutan; 147 (42.2)
Janak Chaturanga 88; Jigme Singye 3-53		Jigme Singye 42; J. Naizi 3-33

Bahrain won by 170 runs
Indian Association Ground
Player of the match: (Bahrain) Janaka Chaturanga

- Bhutan won the toss and chose to field.
