= Vasantha Kunder =

Indian-born cricketer (born 1980)

Personal information
- Born: 20 July 1980 (age 46); Tonse West, India

International information
- National side: Bahrain
- Source: Cricinfo, 16 July 2015

Vasantha Kunder (born 20 July 1980) is an Indian-born cricketer who played for the Bahrain national cricket team. He played in the 2013 ICC World Cricket League Division Six tournament.
