= Imran Ghulam =

Bahraini cricketer (born 1980)

Personal information
- Born: 1 February 1980 (age 46)

International information
- National side: Bahrain
- Source: Cricinfo, 16 July 2015

Imran Ghulam (born 1 February 1980) is a cricketer who plays for the Bahrain national cricket team. He played in the 2013 ICC World Cricket League Division Six tournament.
