= Onwuzulike =

Onwuzulike is a surname. Notable people with the surname include:

- Chimezie Onwuzulike (born 1987), Nigerian cricketer
- Osita Onwuzulike (born 1984), Nigerian cricketer
