= Mirza Baig =

Bahraini cricketer (born 1975)

Personal information
- Full name: Mirza Baig
- Born: 14 December 1975 (age 50); Islamabad, Pakistan

International information
- National side: Bahrain
- Source: Cricinfo, 15 July 2015

Mirza Baig (Urdu: مرزا بیگ, born 14 December 1975) is a Pakistani cricketer who plays for the Bahrain national cricket team. He played in the 2013 ICC World Cricket League Division Six tournament.
