= Leutlwetse Tshireletso =

Motswana footballer and coach

Personal information
- Full name: Leutlwetse Tshireletso
- Date of birth: 25 August 1985 (age 41)
- Place of birth: Francistown
- Height: 1.82 m (5 ft 11 1/2 in)
- Position: Centreback

Team information
- Current team: Township Rollers (assistant manager)

Senior career*
Years	Team	Apps	(Gls)
2006–2010	Motlakase Power Dynamos		
2010–2013	BMC		
2013–2016	Township Rollers		

International career^{‡}
2014–2016	Botswana	7	(0)
- * Club domestic league appearances and goals as of 29 August 2009 ‡ National team caps and goals as of 4 October 2019

Leutlwetse Tshireletso (born 25 August 1985) is a Motswana football coach and former player signed to Township Rollers as an assistant coach. He is a former Botswana international, having made seven appearances for the Zebras before his retirement in 2016.

== Career ==
Tshireletso began his playing career with Palapye-based side Motlakase Power Dynamos. After staying with the team for four years he would move to Lobatse with BMC before finally joining Township Rollers. Although he won the Botswana Premier League in his first season with the team, Tshireletso suffered from frequent injuries and was mostly used as a bench player. Following a knee injury which forced him into injury in 2016, Rollers appointed him as one of the three assistant managers alongside Thabo Motang and Mogomotsi Mpote. He remains in that post to this day and occasionally takes charge of the first team in the absence of the manager.

== Honours ==
=== Club ===
Township Rollers

2013–14
