= Ricky Sharma =

Nigerian cricketer (born 1978)

Personal information
- Born: 1 December 1978 (age 47)

International information
- National side: Nigeria
- Source: Cricinfo, 18 July 2015

Ricky Sharma (born 1 December 1978) is a Nigerian cricketer. He played in the 2013 ICC World Cricket League Division Six tournament.
