= Mirza Yaqoob =

Bahraini cricketer (born 1974)

Personal information
- Born: 29 December 1974 (age 51)

International information
- National side: Bahrain
- Source: Cricinfo, 15 July 2015

Mirza Yaqoob (born 29 December 1974) is a cricketer who plays for the Bahrain national cricket team. He played in the 2013 ICC World Cricket League Division Six tournament.
