= Gaolape Mokokwe =

Botswana cricketer (born 1984)

Personal information
- Born: 24 September 1984 (age 42)
- Batting: Right-handed
- Bowling: Right arm medium
- Role: Wicketkeeper

International information
- National side: Botswana
- Source: Cricinfo, 7 September 2015

Gaolape Mokokwe (born 24 September 1984) is a Botswana cricketer. He played in the 2015 ICC World Cricket League Division Six tournament.
