= Oliver Newey =

Guernsey cricketer (born 1986)

Personal information
- Full name: Oliver Edward Newey
- Born: 19 September 1986 (age 40); Lichfield, Staffordshire, England
- Batting: Right-handed
- Bowling: Right-arm medium
- Role: Wicket-keeper

International information
- National side: Guernsey
- T20I debut (cap 7): 31 May 2019 v Jersey
- Last T20I: 1 May 2022 v Spain

Career statistics
Competition	T20I
Matches	10
Runs scored	69
Batting average	11.50
100s/50s	0/0
Top score	23*
Catches/stumpings	4/1
- Source: Cricinfo, 26 May 2026

Oliver Newey (born 19 September 1986) is a cricketer who plays for Guernsey. He played in the 2014 ICC World Cricket League Division Five tournament. In May 2015 he participated in the 2015 ICC Europe Division One tournament.

In the 2015 ICC World Cricket League Division Six, Newey made 129 not out against Fiji, for which he was awarded with the man of the match.

He played in the 2016 ICC World Cricket League Division Five tournament, taking 8 wickets in six matches.

In September 2017, he scored the most runs for Guernsey in the 2017 ICC World Cricket League Division Five tournament, with a total of 286 runs in five matches.

In May 2019, he was named in Guernsey's squad for the 2019 T20 Inter-Insular Cup. He made his Twenty20 International (T20I) debut for Guernsey against Jersey on 31 May 2019. The same month, he was named in Guernsey's squad for the Regional Finals of the 2018–19 ICC T20 World Cup Europe Qualifier tournament in Guernsey.
