= Thabo Motang =

Motswana footballer and coach

Personal information
- Full name: Thabo Motang
- Date of birth: 20 November 1967 (age 58)
- Place of birth: Goodhope, Botswana
- Position: Goalkeeper

Team information
- Current team: Township Rollers (goalkeeper coach)

Senior career*
Years	Team	Apps	(Gls)
1987–1999	Township Rollers		
1999–2004	BMC		
2004–2006	Mahalapye United Hotpurs (player-manager)		

International career^{‡}
1984–1987	Botswana U20		
1988-1996	Botswana	37	(0)
- * Club domestic league appearances and goals as of 29 August 2009 ‡ National team caps and goals as of 4 October 2019

Thabo Motang (born 20 November 1967) is a Motswana football coach and former player currently managing Township Rollers in the Botswana Premier League. Often regarded as one of the best Botswana goalkeepers of all time, he played for several teams including Township Rollers, where he became one of their longest serving players, BMC and Mahalapye United Hotpurs.

Motang began his career with Township Rollers as a twenty year old in 1987. Staying twelve years with the Gaborone-based outfit, in which he became one of their longest serving players, Motang won two league titles and three FA Cups. He then moved to Lobatse-based BMC, helping them gain promotion to the top flight in his last season. He joined Mahalapye United Hotspurs in 2004 as a player-manager and finally retired from playing altogether in 2006.

== Early life ==
Motang was born in the Borolong area of Goodhope but was raised up in Selebi-Phikwe. He began playing football at primary school, functioning primarily as a defensive midfielder. After a game in which Mmoloki Sechele scored from the centre line Motang angrily took over as goalkeeper and never relinquished the role.

== Club career ==
=== Township Rollers ===
Motang debuted for Rollers in 1987 aged 20. Although Rollers at the time had experienced goalkeepers like Sam Sono, Kabelo Otukile and Mchuu Manyelela, Motang quickly asserted himself as the number one choice. He stayed twelve years at the club, outlasting younger keepers such as Lesego Moeng and becoming a firm fan favourite.

=== Botswana Meat Commission ===
In 1999 Motang moved to BMC, then plying their trade in the second division of Botswana football. Although he played a starring role in helping the team earn promotion to the top league twice, he eventually subsided and became a backup for Reuben Mosweu.

=== Mahalapye United Hotspurs ===
After announcing his professional retirement in 2004 Motang resurfaced at Mahalpye-based Hotspurs as a player-manager. Primarily the coach, he was also the third-choice goalkeeper and goalkeeper coach. He officially retired from active playing in 2006 and took over full-time as the goalkeeper coach.

== International career ==
Motang first came to prominence in 1984 while still playing secondary school football. He was selected for various youth tournaments which he played with Botswana U20. He made his senior debut in a 2–1 win against Zambia in 1988. During his playing career Botswana never qualified for any major tournaments. He was criticised by fans in 1992 after seemingly blaming his teammate Mooketsi Mading for a 6–0 defeat against Ivory Coast.

== Managerial career ==
Motang began coaching while playing for Mahalapye United Hotspurs from 2004 to 2006. In 2006 he took over full-time as the goalkeeper coach. Two years later he moved to his former club Township Rollers and was soon applauded as the best goalkeeper coach in Botswana after contributing significantly to the development of Kabelo Dambe. In 2014, after helping Rollers win two league titles and a cup, Motang landed in hot water after taking the club to court over unpaid wages, leading to him being given an unpaid suspension. Eventually the two parted ways, with Motang being appointed Extension Gunners assistant manager, though he acted as the manager following the departure of Odirile Matlhaku. Motang stayed with the Peleng giants for only one season before joining Gaborone United ahead of the 2015–16 season. However, in January of the same season he returned to Township Rollers as goalkeeper coach and joint assistant manager. He remained in that post until he was announced as the new head coach on 4 July 2022 following the departure of French-born manager Romain Folz.

== Honours ==
=== Club ===
Township Rollers

- Botswana Premier League:2

1987, 1995

- Botswana FA Cup:3

1993, 1994, 1996

Botswana Meat Commission

- Botswana First Division South:1

2001-02
