= List of Fiji Twenty20 International cricketers =

This is a list of Fijian Twenty20 International cricketers.

In April 2018, the ICC decided to grant full Twenty20 International (T20I) status to all its members. Therefore, all Twenty20 matches played between Fiji and other ICC members after 1 January 2019 will be eligible to have T20I status.

This list comprises all members of the Fiji cricket team who have played at least one T20I match. It is initially arranged in the order in which each player won his first Twenty20 cap. Where more than one player won his first Twenty20 cap in the same match, those players are listed alphabetically by surname. Fiji played their first matches with T20I status during the 2022–23 ICC Men's T20 World Cup East Asia-Pacific Qualifier on 9 September 2022 in Port Vila, Vanuatu.

== Key ==
General

- ‡ – Captain
- † – Wicket-keeper
- First – Year of debut
- Last – Year of latest game
- Mat – Number of matches played

Batting

- Runs – Runs scored in career
- HS – Highest score
- Avg – Runs scored per dismissal
- * – Batsman remained not out
- 50 – Number of half centuries

Bowling

- Balls – Balls bowled in career
- Wkt – Wickets taken in career
- BBI – Best bowling in an innings
- Ave – Average runs per wicket

Fielding

- Ca – Catches taken
- St – Stumpings affected

== List of players ==
Statistics are correct as of 18 May 2026.

Fiji T20I cricketers
General					Batting				Bowling				Fielding		Ref
No.	Name	First	Last	Mat	Runs	HS	Avg	50	Balls	Wkt	BBI	Ave	Ca	St	Ref
1	Noa Acawei	2022	2026	16	240	48*	16.00	0	–	–	–	–	5	0	
2	Josaia Baleicikobia	2022	2026	12	143	39	11.91	0	66	2	2/29	53.50	3	0	
3	Jone Wesele‡	2022	2023	6	28	11	7.00	0	141	7	4/31	23.71	3	0	
4	Metuisela Beitaki†	2022	2026	20	221	33*	12.27	0	–	–	–	–	11	3	
5	Petero Cabebula	2022	2023	10	14	6*	2.33	0	214	11	4/14	23.45	3	0	
6	Samuela Draunivudi	2022	2022	3	6	6*	–	0	54	1	1/34	86.00	1	0	
7	Delaimatuku Maraiwai	2022	2023	9	109	23	13.62	0	–	–	–	–	6	0	
8	Sekove Ravoka	2022	2022	6	25	13	6.25	0	120	7	3/23	18.28	3	0	
9	Seru Tupou	2022	2026	15	183	35	12.20	0	253	20	3/6	13.95	1	0	
10	Peni Vuniwaqa‡	2022	2026	22	617	72*	29.38	3	221	8	2/29	43.62	7	0	
11	Tevita Waqavakatoga	2022	2024	10	47	18	9.40	0	156	7	2/16	26.71	3	0	
12	Sosiceni Weleilakeba	2022	2022	3	8	8	8.00	0	18	0	–	–	2	0	
13	Sosiceni Delai	2022	2022	1	16	16	16.00	0	–	–	–	–	0	0	
14	Peni Dakainivanua	2023	2026	16	112	39*	8.61	0	318	15	4/32	23.93	1	0	
15	Peni Kotoisuva	2023	2024	10	63	28*	9.00	0	108	7	2/24	24.71	2	0	
16	Villame Manakitoga	2023	2023	2	–	–	–	–	42	3	2/29	19.00	3	0	
17	Siteri Tabuisulu	2023	2026	16	17	5	1.88	0	319	7	2/23	56.14	7	0	
18	Cakacaka Veretaki†	2023	2023	4	106	60	26.50	1	–	–	–	–	0	3	
19	Uraia Sorovakatini	2023	2023	1	2	2*	–	0	12	1	1/19	19.00	0	0	
20	Saimoni Tuitoga	2023	2023	2	27	27	13.50	0	–	–	–	–	0	0	
21	Josaia Cama	2024	2024	5	31	24	6.20	0	–	–	–	–	1	0	
22	James Junior	2024	2024	2	12	9	12.00	0	–	–	–	–	0	0	
23	Joeli Moala	2024	2024	6	9	5	2.25	0	120	9	3/21	12.77	2	0	
24	Anish Shah	2024	2024	2	5	4	5.00	0	30	1	1/32	52.00	0	0	
25	Apete Sokovagone	2024	2024	6	174	62	29.00	1	24	0	–	–	3	0	
26	Dawson Tawake	2024	2024	6	59	18	9.83	0	–	–	–	–	2	0	
27	Sunia Yalimaiwai	2024	2024	3	1	1*	1.00	0	60	4	2/11	15.00	0	0	
28	Kau Qalo	2024	2024	2	26	26	13.00	0	–	–	–	–	0	0	
29	Kitione Tayaga	2026	2026	4	31	12	7.75	0	12	0	–	–	2	0	
30	Vilisoni Veiqravi	2026	2026	6	67	29	11.16	0	–	–	–	–	0	0	
31	Savenaca Waqabaca	2026	2026	5	7	2*	–	0	24	2	2/19	13.00	0	0	
32	Viliame Waqavakatoga	2026	2026	6	22	8	4.40	0	56	0	–	–	2	0	
32	Taleivuli Jikoibure	2026	2026	2	0	0	0.00	0	–	–	–	–	1	0	
33	Manase Ravula	2026	2026	3	99	47*	49.50	0	–	–	–	–	1	0	
