= Moiz Shahid =

Emirati cricketer (born 1988)

Personal information
- Born: 27 April 1988 (age 38); United Arab Emirates
- Batting: Right-handed
- Bowling: Left-arm medium-fast
- Role: Bowler
- Source: Cricinfo, 7 January 2010

Moiz Shahid is a cricketer who played for the United Arab Emirates. Moiz is a right-handed batsman and a left-arm seam bowler. Moiz made his debut against Singapore in the 2009 ACC Twenty20 Cup. He finished the tournament as the UAE's leading wicket-taker.
