= James Wilkes-Green =

Guernsey cricketer (born 1995)

Personal information
- Born: 19 October 1995 (age 31)
- Batting: Right-handed
- Role: Batsman

International information
- National side: Guernsey
- Source: Cricinfo, 4 May 2019

James Nicholas Lawrenson Wilkes-Green (born 19 October 1995) is an ex-Sussex Academy, Durham MCCU and Guernsey cricketer.

Most recently, Wilkes-Green represented Durham MCCU. Previously, he represented Sussex County Cricket Club between under-14 and under-17 and at the Emerging Player and Academy levels. He was selected on two Academy tours to Cape Town and one Emerging Player tour to Abu Dhabi.

Wilkes-Green was named in Guernsey's squad for the 2015 ICC World Cricket League Division Six tournament in England, playing in two matches.

Wilkes-Green was educated at Elizabeth College, Guernsey and Hurstpierpoint College. He studied BA Geography at Durham University (Hatfield College), where he played cricket for (and captained) Durham MCCU.
