= Bahrain Cricket Federation =

Sports governing body in Bahrain

- Sport: Cricket
- Jurisdiction: Bahrain
- Founded: 2001; 25 years ago
- Affiliation: International Cricket Council
- Regional affiliation: Asian Cricket Council
- Headquarters: Manama, Bahrain
- President: Sami Ali
- Chairman: Mohammed Mansoor
- (Bahrain)

Bahrain Cricket Federation is the official governing body of the sport of cricket in Bahrain. Bahrain Cricket Federation is Bahrain's representative at the International Cricket Council and is an associate member and has been a member of that body since 2001. It is also a member of the Asian Cricket Council.

== Governing Body ==
The Bahrain National Cricket team is governed by the Bahrain Cricket Federation (BCF), which was formerly known as the Cricket Bahrain Association (CBA). The BCF was revamped and had a new Board appointed in 2021 under the patronage of His Highness Sheikh Khalid bin Hamad Al Khalifa and the General Sports Authority (GSA).

Sami Ali serves as the President of the BCF. Mohammad Mansoor is the Chairman of the Advisory Board of the Bahrain Cricket Federation.

Mohammad Mansoor launched the first-ever franchise-based T20 Cricket Premier League in Bahrain in 2018, followed by the establishment of Bahrain's first Women's Cricket Team in 2022. Bahrain's efforts in this area were recognized with an ICC award. He facilitated Bahrain's hosting of the Asian Cricket Council (ACC) Annual General Meeting (AGM) for the first time.

The Bahrain Cricket Association supports initiatives like the ICC Criiio programme to grow grassroots cricket in schools and has also helped Bahrain host the ICC Level 3 Coaching Programme.

== See also ==
- Bahrain national cricket team
- Bahrain women's national cricket team
- List of Bahrain Twenty20 International cricketers
