= 2013 ICC World Cricket League Division Six =

- Dates: 21 July – 28 July 2013
- Administrator: International Cricket Council
- Cricket format: List A
- Tournament format(s): Round Robin and Playoffs
- Host: Jersey
- Champions: Jersey
- Participants: 6
- Matches: 18
- Player of the series: Peter Gough (Jersey)
- Most runs: Peter Gough (247)
- Most wickets: Oluseye Olympio (18)

The 2013 ICC World Cricket League Division Six was a cricket tournament that took place from 21 to 28 July 2013. It formed part of the ICC World Cricket League and qualifying for the 2019 Cricket World Cup.

Jersey hosted the event.

== Teams ==
The teams that took part in the tournament were decided according to the results of the 2011 ICC World Cricket League Division Six, the 2012 ICC World Cricket League Division Five and the 2013 ICC World Cricket League Division Seven.

Team	Last outcome
Bahrain	Relegated from 2012 ICC World Cricket League Division Five after finishing 5th
Argentina	Relegated from 2012 ICC World Cricket League Division Five after finishing 6th
Kuwait	Still from 2011 ICC World Cricket League Division Six after finishing 3rd
Jersey	Still from 2011 ICC World Cricket League Division Six after finishing 4th
Nigeria	Promoted from 2013 ICC World Cricket League Division Seven after finishing 1st
Vanuatu	Promoted from 2013 ICC World Cricket League Division Seven after finishing 2nd

== Squads ==
Argentina	Bahrain	Jersey	Kuwait	Nigeria	Vanuatu
Esteban MacDermott (C); Agustin Casime; Hernan Fennell; Pablo Ferguson; Lautaro Musiani; Matias Paterlini; Martin Siri; Pedro Bruno; Facundo Duggan; Bernardo Irigoyen; Lucas Paterlini; Alejandro Ferguson (Wk); Gary Savage; Hernan Williams	Yaser Sadeq (C); Imran Ghulam; Shahzad Ahmed (Wk); Vasantha Kunder; Mirza Yaqoob; Muhammad Hanif; Shihara Perera; Adnan Butt; Jalil Ahmad; Mirza Baig; Mohammad Dar; Qamar Saeed; Shahzad Siddique; Zafar Zaheer	Peter Gough (C); Edward Farley (Wk); Cornelis Bodenstein; Alex Cooke; Tom Minty; Luke Gallichan; Ben Kynman; Charles Perchard; Corey Bisson; Paul Connolly; Andrew Dewhurst; Edward Farley; Anthony Hawkins-Kay; Ben Stevens	Hisham Mirza (C); Usman Waheed (Wk); Irfan Bhatti; Mohammad Ahsan; Mohammed Ghulam; Saud Qamar; Sibtain Raza; Azmatullah Nazeer; Kashif Sharif; Mohammad Amin; Jagath Roshantha (Wk); Raheel Khan; Sajid Manzil; Shahrukh Quddus	Kunle Adegbola (C); Olajide Bejide; Tyler Easton; Joshua Ogunlola; Segun Olayinka; Ademola Onikoyi; Adeleke Oyede; Saheed Akolade; Mathias Davadayal; Ricky Sharma (Wk); Endurance Ofem; Dotun Olatunji; Oluseye Olympio; Osita Onwuzulike	Andrew Mansale (C); Trevor Langa (Wk); Jelany Chilia; Aby John; Patrick Matautaava; Jaxies Samuel; Kenny Tari; Callum Blake; Jonathon Dunn; Worford Kalworai; Steven Lynch; Nalin Nipiko; Damian Smith; Niko Unavalu

== Points table ==
Pos	Team	Pld	W	L	T	NR	Pts	NRR
1	Jersey	5	5	0	0	0	10	1.438
2	Nigeria	5	4	1	0	0	8	0.815
3	Vanuatu	5	3	2	0	0	6	0.531
4	Argentina	5	2	3	0	0	4	−0.868
5	Bahrain	5	1	4	0	0	2	−0.580
6	Kuwait	5	0	5	0	0	0	−1.088

== Fixtures ==
21 July
11:00
Scorecard

Bahrain; 166 (42.1 overs)	v	Argentina; 167/7 (49.1 overs)
Muhammad Hanif 74 (105); Lucas Paterlini 3/34 (8.1 overs)		Pablo Ferguson 37 (71); Yaser Sadeq 2/22 (7 overs)

Argentina won by 3 wickets
FB Fields, St. Clement
Umpires: Martin Gray (Gcy) and Huub Jansen (Ned)
Player of the match: Alejandro Ferguson (Argentina)

- Bahrain won the toss and elected to bat
- Points: Argentina 2, Bahrain 0

21 July
11:00
Scorecard

Kuwait; 179 (39.5 overs)	v	Jersey; 180/4 (41.2 overs)
Mohammed Ghulam 40 (45); Cornelis Bodenstein 3/48 (7.5 overs)		Luke Gallichan 72* (114); Irfan Bhatti 2/22 (5 overs)

Jersey won by 6 wickets
Grainville Cricket Ground, St. Saviour
Umpires: Rob Bailey (Eng) and Sri Ganesh (Sin)
Player of the match: Luke Gallichan (Jersey)

- Jersey won the toss and elected to field
- Points: Jersey 2, Kuwait 0

21 July
11:00
Scorecard

Nigeria; 230 (49.2 overs)	v	Vanuatu; 224/8 (50.0 overs)
Kunle Adegbola 44 (88); Jelany Chilia 2/28 (10 overs)		Andrew Mansale 58 (91); Oluseye Olympio 3/41 (10 overs)

Nigeria won by 6 runs
Les Quennevais, St. Brélade
Umpires: Ashraf Din (Ned) and Durga Subedi (Nep)
Player of the match: Andrew Mansale (Vanuatu)

- Vanuatu won the toss and elected to field.
- Points: Nigeria 2, Vanuatu 0

22 July
11:00
Scorecard

Argentina; 169 (49.4 overs)	v	Vanuatu; 170/4 (42.5 overs)
Pablo Ferguson 54 (114); Jaxies Samuel 2/20 (10 overs)		Damian Smith 73* 125; Lucas Paterlini 2/37 (10 overs)

Vanuatu won by 6 wickets
FB Fields, St. Clement
Umpires: Rob Bailey (Eng) and Huub Jansen (Ned)
Player of the match: Damian Smith (Vanuatu)

- Argentina won the toss and elected to bat.
- Points: Vanuatu 2, Argentina 0

22 July
11:00
Scorecard

Bahrain; 245/7 (50 overs)	v	Jersey; 246/3 (44 overs)
Mohammad Dar 60 (65); Cornelis Bodenstein 2/53 (10 overs); Tom Minty 2/53 (10 overs)		Peter Gough 100 (122); Mirza Baig 1/23 (4 overs)

Jersey won by 7 wickets
Les Quennevais, St. Brélade
Umpires: Alan Neill (Ire) and Sri Ganesh (Sin)
Player of the match: Peter Gough (Jersey)

- Jersey won the toss and elected to field.
- Points: Jersey 2, Bahrain 0

22 July
11:00
Scorecard

Nigeria; 263/9 (50 overs)	v	Kuwait; 152 (40.2 overs)
Dotun Olatunji 66 (66); Shahrukh Quddus 5/59 (10 overs)		Hisham Mirza 49 (63); Kunle Adegbola 4/24 (8.2 overs)

Nigeria won by 111 runs
Grainville Cricket Ground, St. Saviour
Umpires: Martin Gray (Gcy) and Durga Subedi (Nep)
Player of the match: Kunle Adegbola (Nigeria)

- Kuwait own the toss and elected to field.
- Points: Nigeria 2, Kuwait 0

24 July
11:00
Scorecard

Kuwait; 205 (44.2 overs)	v	Argentina; 207/9 (49.3 overs)
Saud Qamar 83 (99); Lucas Paterlini 4/45 (9.2 overs)		Martin Siri 59 (76); Mohammad Ahsan 2/28 (9.3 overs)

Argentina won by 1 wicket
Farmers Cricket Club Ground, St. Martin
Umpires: Rob Bailey (Eng) and Alan Neill (Ire)
Player of the match: Saud Qamar (Kuwait)

- Argentina won the toss and elected to field.
- Points: Argentina 2, Kuwait 0

24 July
11:00
Scorecard

Vanuatu; 244 (49.4 overs)	v	Bahrain; 209 (46.1 overs)
Andrew Mansale 101 (109); Mirza Baig 4/52 (9.4 overs)		Shahzad Siddique 84 (98); Nalin Nipiko 3/32 (10 overs)

Vanuatu won by 35 runs
Grainville Cricket Ground, St. Saviour
Umpires: Sri Ganesh (Sin) and Durga Subedi (Nep)
Player of the match: Andrew Mansale (Vanuatu)

- Bahrain won the toss and elected to field.
- Points: Vanuatu 2, Bahrain 0

24 July
11:00
Scorecard

Nigeria; 96 (40.1 overs)	v	Jersey; 100/4 (22.1 overs)
Ricky Sharma 53 (110); Ben Stevens 3/13 (10 overs)		Edward Farley 47* (61); Saheed Akolade 3/26 (10 overs)

Jersey won by 6 wickets
FB Fields, St. Clement
Umpires: Ashraf Din (Ned) and Martin Gray (Gcy)
Player of the match: Ben Stevens (Jersey)

- Nigeria won the toss and elected to bat.
- Points: Jersey 2, Nigeria 0

25 July
11:00
scorecard

Bahrain; 104 (33 overs)	v	Nigeria; 106/2 (28.1 overs)
Mirza Baig 36 (66); Saheed Akolade 6/27 (8 overs)		Segun Olayinka 50 (81); Zafar Zaheer 1/16 (10 overs)

Nigeria won by 8 wickets
Farmers Cricket Club Ground, St. Martin
Umpires: Huub Jansen (Netherlands) and Durga Subedi (Nepal)
Player of the match: Saheed Akolade (Nigeria)

- Baharain won the toss and elected to bat.
- Points: Nigeria 2, Bahrain 0

25 July
11:00
scorecard

Argentina; 176 (46.2 overs)	v	Jersey; 177/2 (29.1 overs)
Martin Siri 78 (113); Ben Stevens 5/38 (9.2 overs)		Peter Gough* 69 (87); Hernan Fennell 1/32 (5 overs)

Jersey won by 8 wickets
Grainville Cricket Ground, St. Saviour
Umpires: Martin Gray (Gcy) and Alan Neill (Ire)
Player of the match: Ben Stevens (Jersey)

- Jersey won the toss and choose to field.
- Points: Jersey 2, Argentina 0

25 July
11:00
scorecard

Kuwait; 107 (24.3 overs)	v	Vanuatu; 108/5 (26.3 overs)
Irfan Bhatti 31(37); Nalin Nipiko 4/30 (9 overs)		Andrew Mansale* 39 (53); Mohammad Ahsan 2/34 (9 overs)

Vanuatu won by 5 wickets
FB Fields, St. Clement
Umpires: Rob Bailey (Eng) and Ashraf Din (Ned)
Player of the match: Nalin Nipiko (Vanuatu)

- Vanuatu won the toss and choose to field
- Points: Vanuatu 2, Kuwait 0

27 July
11:00
Scorecard

Argentina; 144 (46.3 overs)	v	Nigeria; 26/1 (6 overs)
Gary Savage 40 (97); Osita Onwuzulike 3/23 (10 overs)		Segun Olayinka 12* (16)

No result
Grainville Cricket Ground, St. Saviour
Umpires: Rob Bailey (Eng) and Martin Gray (Gcy)

- Nigeria won the toss and elected to field.
- Match abandoned due to rain. Match replayed on 28 July.

27 July
11:00
Scorecard

Bahrain; 238/9 (50 overs)	v	Kuwait
Imran Ghulam 57* (36); Azmatullah Nazeer 3/14 (10 overs)

No result
FB Fields, St. Clement
Umpires: Huub Jansen (Ned) and Sri Ganesh (Sin)

- Kuwait won the toss and elected to field.
- Match abandoned due to rain. Match replayed on 28 July.

27 July
11:00
Scorecard

Vanuatu; 135 (44.3 overs)	v	Jersey; 27/0 (9 overs)
Patrick Matautaava 27 (30); Ben Stevens 4/22 (10 overs)		Corey Bisson 16* (26)

No result
Farmers Cricket Club Ground, St. Martin
Umpires: Ashraf Din (Ned) and Alan Neill (Ire)

- Jersey won the toss and elected to field.
- Match abandoned due to rain. Match replayed on 28 July.

28 July
11:00
Scorecard

Argentina; 185 (46 overs)	v	Nigeria; 188/2 (29.1 overs)
Lucas Paterlini 48 (47); Oluseye Olympio 6/23 (9 overs)		Segun Olayinka 94* (73); Lucas Paterlini 1/41 (8 overs)

Nigeria won by 8 wickets
Grainville Cricket Ground, St. Saviour
Umpires: Rob Bailey (Eng) and Martin Gray (Gcy)
Player of the match: Segun Olayinka (Nigeria)

- Nigeria won the toss and elected to field.
- Points: Nigeria 2, Argentina 0

28 July
11:00
Scorecard

Bahrain; 186 (48 overs)	v	Kuwait; 171 (46.2 overs)
Shahzad Ahmed 46 (40); Raheel Khan 3/20 (6 overs)		Azmatullah Nazeer 48 (51); Imran Ghulam 3/20 (7 overs)

Bahrain won by 15 runs
FB Fields, St. Clement
Umpires: Huub Jansen (Ned) and Sri Ganesh (Sin)
Player of the match: Imran Ghulam (Kuwait)

- Bahrain won the toss and elected to bat.
- Points: Bahrain 2, Kuwait 0

28 July
11:00
Scorecard

Jersey; 193/3 (43.2 overs)	v	Vanuatu; 189/9 (50 overs)
Peter Gough 57 (99); Nalin Nipiko 2/30 (7 overs)		Trevor Langa 53 (76); Ben Stevens 3/21 (10 overs

Jersey won by 7 wickets
Farmers Cricket Club Ground, St. Martin
Umpires: Ashraf Din (Ned) and Alan Neill (Ire)
Player of the match: Ben Stevens (Jersey)

- Vanuatu won the toss and elected to bat.
- Points: Jersey 2, Vanuatu 0

== Final and Playoffs ==
The playoff matches were cancelled after the abandonment of fifth-round group matches led to replays on the day the playoff matches were scheduled.

== Statistics ==
=== Most runs ===
The top five highest run scorers (total runs) are included in this table.

Player	Team	Runs	Inns	Avg	S/R	HS	100s	50s
Peter Gough	Jersey	247	6	61.75	69.77	100	1	2
Andrew Mansale	Vanuatu	238	6	47.60	67.23	101	1	1
Segun Olayinka	Nigeria	199	6	66.33	89.23	94*	0	2
Martin Siri	Argentina	196	6	32.66	62.82	78	0	2
Ben Stevens	Jersey	193	5	48.25	83.18	69*	0	2

=== Most wickets ===
The following table contains the five leading wicket-takers.

Player	Team	Wkts	Mts	Ave	S/R	Econ	BBI
Oluseye Olympio	Nigeria	18	6	10.61	17.6	3.60	6/23
Ben Stevens	Jersey	17	6	9.58	20.6	2.78	5/38
Saheed Akolade	Nigeria	13	6	15.30	23/7	3.86	6/27
Tom Minty	Jersey	11	5	13.00	24.5	3/17	3/20
Nalin Nipiko	Vanuatu	11	6	14.45	17.6	4.91	4/30

== Final Placings ==
After the conclusion of the tournament the teams were distributed as follows:

Pos	Team	Promotion/Relegation
1st	Jersey	Promoted to 2014 Division Five
2nd	Nigeria	Promoted to 2014 Division Five
3rd	Vanuatu	Remain in 2015 Division Six
4th	Argentina	Relegated to Regional tournaments
5th	Bahrain	Relegated to Regional tournaments
6th	Kuwait	Relegated to Regional tournaments
