= Chicago Catchers =

American cricket team in Minor League Cricket

- League: Minor League Cricket
- Conference: Central Division (Pacific Conference)

Personnel
- Captain: Rizwan Cheema
- Owner: Cricket Management Group, LLC

Team information
- City: Chicago, Illinois
- Colours: Light Green, and Red.
- Founded: 2020; 6 years ago
- Dissolved: 2022; 4 years ago
- Home ground: Washington Park
T20 kit

The Chicago Catchers were an American professional Twenty20 franchise cricket team that competed in Minor League Cricket (MiLC). The team was based in Chicago, Illinois. It was formed in 2020 as part of 24 original teams to compete in Minor League Cricket. The franchise was owned by the Cricket Management Group, LLC.

The team's home ground was Washington Park, located in Chicago, Illinois. Former Canadian cricket captain Rizwan Cheema helmed captaincy duties, while Karan Kumar stood by as vice-captain.

Americans Shreyas Ramesh and Ranadeep Aleti led the bowling and batting leaderboards with 266 runs and 10 wickets respectively.

== Franchise history ==
=== Background ===
Talks of an American Twenty20 league started in November 2018 before USA Cricket became the new governing body of cricket in the United States. In May 2021, USA Cricket announced they accepted a bid by American Cricket Enterprises (ACE) for a US$1 billion investment covering the league and other investments benefitting the U.S. national teams.

In an Annual General Meeting (AGM) on February 21, 2020, it was announced that USA Cricket planned to launch Major League Cricket in 2021 and Minor League Cricket that summer, but it was delayed due to the COVID-19 pandemic and due to the lack of high-quality cricket stadiums in the U.S. Major League Cricket was pushed to a summer-2023 launch and Minor League Cricket was pushed back to July 31, 2021.

USA Cricket CEO Iain Higgins also pointed out cities such as New York City, Houston and Los Angeles with a large cricket fanbase, and targeted them among others as launch cities for Minor League Cricket.

=== Exhibition league ===
In July 2020, the player registration for the Minor League Cricket exhibition league began. On August 15, 2020, USA Cricket announced the teams participating in the exhibition league matches, also listing the owners for each team. The draft for the exhibition league began on August 22, 2020, with the Chicago Catchers releasing their squad on September 12. Rizwan Cheema was later named as captain for the Blasters, with Karan Kumar down for vice-captaincy duties for the exhibition league.

=== 2021 season ===
After the conclusion of the exhibition league, USA Cricket announced that they were planning to launch the inaugural season of Minor League Cricket in spring 2021. Ahead of the official season, which was announced to kick off on July 31, the Catchers announced Rizwan Cheema as captain with Karan Kumar helming vice-captain duties.

Throughout the group stage, the Catchers lost all of their matches, losing twice against the Athletics, the Blasters, the Hurricanes, the Stars, and the Americans, while losing once against the Strikers, the Blazers, and the Mustangs. The Catchers finished last in their group, thus not advancing to the quarterfinals.

=== 2022 season ===
For the 2022 season, it was announced that MiLC was replacing the Catchers with the Chicago Tigers.

== Squad ==
- Players with international caps are listed in **bold**.

Name	Nationality	Birth date	Batting style	Bowling style	Year signed	Notes
Batsmen
Abhyu Garg	United States	23 May 1995 (age 31)	Right-handed	Right-arm fast medium	2021	
Karan Kumar	England	8 September 1992 (age 34)	Right-handed	Right-arm medium	2021	Overseas
Kevin Phillip	United States	5 February 1992 (age 34)	Right-handed	Right-arm medium fast	2021	
Deepchand Pinnaka	United States	18 April 1994 (age 32)	Right-handed	Right-arm off break	2021	
**Rizwan Cheema**	Canada	15 August 1978 (age 48)	Right-handed	Right-arm medium	2021	Overseas captain
Shreyas Ramesh	United States	17 July 1988 (age 38)	Right-handed	Right-arm medium fast	2021	
All-rounders
Akul Gupta	United States	19 June 1991 (age 35)	Left-handed	Right-arm leg break googly	2021	
Ankush Agarwal	United States	25 March 1998 (age 28)	Right-handed	Right-arm off break	2021	
Asmar Najam	United States	5 July 1982 (age 44)	Right-handed	Slow left-arm orthodox	2021	
Pankaj Kampli	United States	22 December 1986 (age 39)	Right-handed	Right-arm leg break	2021	
Ranadeep Aleti	United States	20 October 1990 (age 35)	Right-handed	Right-arm fast medium	2021	
Salman Ahmed	Pakistan	11 December 1964 (age 61)	Right-handed	Right-arm off break	2021	Overseas
Sandeep Sivaram	United States	17 January 1992 (age 34)	Right-handed	Slow left-arm unorthodox bowling	2021	
Saquib Chowdary	United States	18 August 1988 (age 38)	Right-handed	Right-arm fast medium	2021	
Shiraz Najam	United States	18 April 1981 (age 45)	Right-handed	Right-arm medium fast	2021	
Sikander Soleja	United States	4 January 1986 (age 40)	Right-handed	Right-arm medium	2021	
Tejas Vishal	United States	19 August 2001 (age 25)	Right-handed	Right-arm medium	2021	
Wicket-keepers
Sneh Patel	United States	8 September 1995 (age 31)	Right-handed		2021	
