= Mohammed Mansoor =

Bahraini businessman and Chairman of the Bahrain Cricket Federation

Mohammad Mansoor
- Born: Mohammad Mansoor; March 29, 1967 (age 59); Hejamadi, Karnataka, India
- Occupations: Businessman, sports administrator
- Known for: Elected representative to the Asian Cricket Council (ACC) executive board for 2026, Chairman of the Advisory Board of the Bahrain Cricket Federation, Founder and Chief Executive Officer of SAARA Group
- Height: 5 ft 8 in (1.77 m)

Mohammad Mansoor (born March 29, 1967) is an Indian businessman based out of Bahrain and sports administrator. He is the chairman of the advisory board of the Bahrain Cricket Federation (BCF) and the founder and chief executive officer of SAARA Group, a diversified enterprise with operations across multiple sectors including technology, energy, media, sports infrastructure, and social initiatives. He is also an elected member to the Executive Board of the Asian Cricket Council for 2026.

He is also appointed as the director of the World Youth Group, an international consortium of elected young leaders, parliamentarians, and diplomats focused on youth development and the advancement of the United Nations Sustainable Development Goals.

== Sports administration ==
=== Bahrain Cricket Federation ===
Mohammad Mansoor serves as the chairman of the advisory board of Bahrain Cricket Federation, where he has been involved in governance, development programs, and the expansion of cricket infrastructure and participation in Bahrain. He was elected to the Asian Cricket Council (ACC) executive board for 2026 during the ACC General Meeting held in Bangkok, Thailand, attended by representatives from India, Pakistan, Bangladesh, Sri Lanka, Afghanistan, and other ACC member nations.

His role includes supporting grassroots development, international engagement, and organizational growth of the sport within the country.

In October 2018, his company sponsored a top senior division team of Cricket Bahrain Association (CBA). Young Boys, one of the oldest cricket teams of Bahrain, was relaunched as Exelon Young Boys by Mohammed Mansoor. Mansoor also established Bahrain women's national cricket team, with the team securing five world records and earning global acclaim.

=== Bahrain Premier League ===
In 2018, Mansoor launched a franchise based Twenty20 cricket for the first time in Bahrain. Six teams were featured in the first edition of the event. The teams were SRam MRam Falcons, Kalaam Knight-Riders, Intex Lions, Bahrain Super Giants, Four Square Challengers and Awan Warriors.

The initiative launched on 6 December 2017, aimed to bring cricket to the mainstream with live broadcasts on Bahrain National Television, digital campaigns, and with Coca-Cola as title sponsor. In 2018, Bahrain Premier League (BPL) was hosted with six franchise squads comprising on 13 member-squads each. The tournament was hosted from 26 January 2018 to 9 March 2018 at the Isa Town Cricket ground, Bahrain.

Later, Mansoor introduced an 8-team women's league, leading Bahrain's women's team to six world records and winning the ICC Women's Initiative of the Year Award. Bahrain secured 25th in ICC T20 rankings, and secured government support to construct a world-class stadium under the patronage of Sheikh Khalid bin Hamad Al Khalifa, alongside a temporary ground, setting the stage for future success. Inviting Jay Shah, Bahrain hosted the first Board Meeting of Asian Cricket Council in Bahrain.

== Business & Investments ==
Mansoor is the Founder and CEO of SAARA Group, a Bahrain-based conglomerate with a portfolio spanning, Information Technology, Energy and Oil & Gas, Artificial Intelligence and Digital Media, Sports Infrastructure, Seed Capital and Strategic Investments, and Social and Community Initiatives.

He leads Exelon, a strategic initiative under SAARA Group focused on developing and managing high-level strategic relationships. Exelon supports collaboration with major regional and global industrial entities, including SABIC and Saudi Aramco, while also overseeing key investment portfolios within the Kingdom of Bahrain.

== Media Initiatives ==
Mansoor is founder of Life n Style Bahrain, a luxury lifestyle media platform based out of Bahrain. The publication covers topics including, luxury, lifestyle, entertainment, fashion, dining, culture, and events. The coverage is primarily focused on Bahrain and the wider GCC region. The publication has featured coverage of local and international personalities, businesses, cultural activities, and public events.

== Recognition ==
On August 1st, 2026, Mohammad Mansoor has been recognized by Aluminium Bahrain B.S.C. (Alba) Chief Executive Officer, Ali Al Baqali, for the strong working relationship between Alba and Exelon Industrial Solutions. The recognition underscored Exelon's service excellence and shared commitment to operational reliability under the leadership of Mansoor. Mohammad Mansoor has been recognized for his contribution to the sports ecosystem in Bahrain and for initiating digitized business operations in the Kingdom of Bahrain. In 2024, he has been awarded the Times of Bahrain TOB Icon Award 2024.

Year	Award	Category	Status
2019	Hind Ratan	38th International Congress of NRIs	Awarded
2022	KCA Award	Kerala Catholics Association	Awarded
2023	Gulf Karnataka Ratna Award	The Gulf Karnatakotsava	Awarded
2024	The Times of Bahrain	The TOB Icon Award 2024	Awarded
2026	Aluminium Bahrain B.S.C	Service Excellence Awards 2026	Awarded
