= Rashaad Mosweu =

Botswana cricketer (born 1998)

Personal information
- Born: 4 April 1998 (age 28); Botswana
- Batting: Right-handed

International information
- National side: Botswana
- Source: Cricinfo, 7 September 2015

Rashaad Mosweu (born 4 April 1998) is a Botswana cricketer. He played in the 2015 ICC World Cricket League Division Six tournament.
