= Tom Minty =

Jersey cricketer (born 1985)

Personal information
- Full name: Thomas Edward Minty
- Born: 3 October 1985 (age 41); Jersey
- Batting: Right-handed

International information
- National side: Jersey
- Source: ESPNcricinfo

Tom Minty (born 3 October 1985) is a professional cricketer who plays for Jersey. In 2014 he played in the 2014 ICC World Cricket League Division Four and he was selected in the Jersey squad for the 2015 ICC World Twenty20 Qualifier tournament.
