= Sekove Ravoka =

Fijian cricketer

Personal information
- Born: 27 June 1986 (age 40)
- Batting: Right-handed

International information
- National side: Fiji
- T20I debut (cap 7): 9 September 2022 v Vanuatu
- Last T20I: 15 September 2022 v Samoa
- Source: Cricinfo, 15 September 2022

Sekove Ravoka (born 27 June 1986) is a Fijian cricketer and a former captain of the Fiji cricket team. Outside of cricket, Ravoka is also a police officer, having joined the Fiji Police Force in July 2020.

In 2013, he was selected for the East-Asia Pacific team that played in the Australian Country Cricket Championship. Ravoka has worked with Cricket Fiji in visiting schools in Australia.

He played in the 2015 ICC World Cricket League Division Six tournament. In August 2018, he was named the captain of Fiji's squad for Group A of the 2018–19 ICC World Twenty20 East Asia-Pacific Qualifier tournament. In April 2021, Ravoka was named in Fiji's training squad ahead of the 2021 ICC Men's T20 World Cup East Asia-Pacific Qualifier tournament in Japan. He was part of Fiji's Twenty20 International (T20I) squad for the 2022 ICC Men's T20 World Cup East Asia-Pacific Qualifier A in Vanuatu. He made his T20I debut on 9 September 2022 against Vanuatu.
