= Echendu Osita =

Nigerian footballer

Echendu
Personal information
- Full name: Echendu Osita
- Date of birth: 4 February 1987 (age 39)
- Place of birth: Kano, Nigeria
- Height: 5 ft 6 in (1.68 m)
- Position: Midfielder

Team information
- Current team: Taraba F.C.
- Number: 16

Youth career
- 2002–2005: Kano Eleven Nigeria

Senior career*
Years	Team	Apps	(Gls)
2005–2009	Heartland	119	(9)
2009–2014	Dolphins FC	136	(11)
2014 Till date	Taraba F.C.	29	(3)

International career^{‡}
2007	Nigeria Beach Soccer	4	(0)
- * Club domestic league appearances and goals ‡ National team caps and goals as of 01 April 2017

Echendu Osita (born 4 February 1987) is a Nigerian professional footballer.
