= Worford Kalworai =

Vanuatuan cricketer (born 1990)

Personal information
- Born: 1 October 1990 (age 36)

International information
- National side: Vanuatu
- Source: Cricinfo, 18 July 2015

Worford Kalworai (born 1 October 1990) is a Vanuatuan cricketer. He played in the 2013 ICC World Cricket League Division Six tournament.

In March 2018, he was named in Vanuatu's squad for the 2018 ICC World Cricket League Division Four tournament in Malaysia. In August 2018, he was named in Vanuatu's squad for Group A of the 2018–19 ICC World Twenty20 East Asia-Pacific Qualifier tournament.
