= Najeeb Amar =

Hong Kong cricketer (born 1971)

Personal information
- Full name: Najeeb Amar
- Born: 25 September 1971 (age 55); Dera Ghazi Khan, Punjab, Pakistan
- Batting: Left-handed
- Bowling: Slow left arm orthodox
- Role: Allrounder

International information
- National side: Hong Kong
- ODI debut (cap 8): 16 July 2004 v Bangladesh
- Last ODI: 25 June 2008 v India

Career statistics
Competition	ODI	LA
Matches	4	14
Runs scored	38	204
Batting average	12.66	18.54
100s/50s	0/0	0/0
Top score	21	49
Balls bowled	240	763
Wickets	3	19
Bowling average	57.33	28.63
5 wickets in innings	0	0
10 wickets in match	0	0
Best bowling	2/40	4/33
Catches/stumpings	1/–	4/–
- Source: CricketArchive, 21 May 2010

Najeeb Amar (born 25 September 1971) is a Pakistani-born Hong Kong former cricketer.

Najeeb made his One Day International (ODI) debut for Hong Kong in the 2004 Asia Cup in Sri Lanka.

Najeeb is a left-arm orthodox spin bowler and lower-order left-handed batsman. In his four ODI matches for Hong Kong, he scored 38 runs at an average of 12.66 and claimed three wickets with his left-arm spin.

He had previously represented the Water and Power Development Authority in the Pakistan local one-day competition.
