= Kenny Tari =

Vanuatuan cricketer (born 1990)

Personal information
- Born: 2 April 1990 (age 36); Vanuatu
- Batting: Right-handed
- Bowling: Right-arm Medium

International information
- National side: Vanuatu
- Only T20I (cap 27): 23 August 2024 v Fiji
- Source: Cricinfo, 23 August 2024

Kenny Tari (born 2 April 1990) is a Vanuatuan cricketer. He played in the 2013 ICC World Cricket League Division Six tournament.
