= Reuben Mosweu =

Motswana footballer

Personal information
- Full name: Reuben Mosweu
- Place of birth: Botswana
- Position: Goalkeeper

Senior career*
Years	Team	Apps	(Gls)
- Botswana Meat Commission

International career
1999	Botswana	1	(0)
- * Club domestic league appearances and goals

Reuben Mosweu is a Motswana former footballer who played as a goalkeeper. He played one match for the Botswana national football team in 1999.

== See also ==
- Football in Botswana
