= Osita Onwuzulike =

Nigerian cricketer (born 1984)

Personal information
- Full name: Ositadinma Benedict Onwuzulike
- Born: 16 August 1984 (age 42); Enugu State Nigeria

International information
- National side: Nigeria
- Source: Cricinfo, 18 July 2015

Osita Onwuzulike (born 16 August 1984) is a Nigerian cricketer. He played in the 2013 ICC World Cricket League Division Six tournament.

He is the elder brother to Chimezie Onwuzulike also a Nigerian cricketer.
