= Bahrain national cricket team =

Bahrain
- Association: Bahrain Cricket Association

Personnel
- Captain: Asif Ali
- Coach: Nishantha Weerasinghe
- Chairman: Mohammed Mansoor

International Cricket Council
- ICC status: Associate member (2017); Affiliate member (2001)
- ICC region: Asia
ICC Rankings	Current	Best-ever
T20I	30th	25th (13 Mar 2025)

International cricket
- First international: v. Kuwait at Kuwait City; 30 October 1979

T20 Internationals
- First T20I: v Saudi Arabia at Oman Cricket Academy Ground, Muscat; 20 January 2019
- Last T20I: v Qatar at Selangor Turf Club, Kuala Lumpur; 14 October 2026
T20Is	Played	Won/Lost
Total	135	78/50 (4 ties, 3 no results)
This year	23	12/10 (1 tie, 0 no results)
- T20 World Cup Qualifier appearances: 2 (Note: For the 2024 and 2026 Men's T20 World Cups, the final round of qualification in Asia was the ICC Asia Regional Final.) (first in 2022)
- Best result: Semi-finals (2023)
List A & T20I kit
- As of 14 October 2026

The Bahrain national cricket team represents the Kingdom of Bahrain in international cricket. The team is organised by the Bahrain Cricket Association (BCA), which became an ICC affiliate member in 2001 and an associate member in 2017.

== History ==
=== Early history ===
Cricket has been played in Bahrain since the early 20th century. The earliest instance of Cricket was recorded in 1932 when a match was played between Royal British Airforce and Royal British Navy. In 1935, the Awali Cricket Club was formed by the then British Oil Company which is now BAPCO – Bahrain Petroleum Company.

The Bahraini national side made its first international appearance in 1979, at an invitational tournament with Kuwait, Qatar, and Sharjah (one of the United Arab Emirates).

=== 20th century ===
Its first appearance in an Asian Cricket Council tournament came at the 2004 ACC Trophy in Malaysia; since then, Bahrain has regularly appeared in ACC events. Bahrain has also made several appearances in World Cricket League tournaments, but was relegated back to regional tournaments after finishing fifth at the 2013 Division Six event.

=== 2018–present ===
In April 2018, the ICC decided to grant full Twenty20 International (T20I) status to all its members. Therefore, all Twenty20 matches played between Bahrain and other ICC members after 1 January 2019 will be full T20Is.

Bahrain made its Twenty20 International debut on 20 January 2019, defeating Saudi Arabia by 41 runs in the 2019 ACC Western Region T20 at Al Emarat Cricket Stadium, Muscat, Oman.

20 January 2019
09:30
Scorecard

Bahrain; 176/4 (20 overs)	v	Saudi Arabia; 135/9 (20 overs)
Imran Ali 58 (53); Usman Ali 1/24 (4 overs)		Muhammad Naeem 42 (36); Babar Ali 2/18 (3 overs)

Bahrain won by 41 runs
Al Amerat Cricket Stadium, Muscat
Umpires: Afzalkhan Pathan (Oma) and Zahid Usman (Kuw)
Player of the match: Sarfaraz Ali (Bhr)

- Saudi Arabia won the toss and elected to field.
- First ever T20I match for Bahrain.

== Tournament history ==
Legend

- Champions
- Runners-up
- Third place/Semi-finals
- Hosts
- Q Qualified/Advanced to next stage
- DNQ Did not qualify
- ▲ Promoted
- Remained in the same division
- ▼ Relegated

=== Cricket World Cup ===
Cricket World Cup record								Qualification record				
Year	Round	Position	Pld	W	L	T	NR	Pld	W	L	T	NR
(England) 1975	Not an ICC member							Not an ICC member				
(England) 1979	Not an ICC member							Not an ICC member				
(England) (Wales) 1983	Not an ICC member							Not an ICC member				
(India) (Pakistan) 1987	Not an ICC member							Not an ICC member				
(Australia) (New Zealand) 1992	Not an ICC member							Not an ICC member				
(Pakistan) (India) (Sri Lanka) 1996	Not an ICC member							Not an ICC member				
(England) (Wales) (Scotland) (Republic of Ireland) (Netherlands) 1999	Not an ICC member							Not an ICC member				
(South Africa) (Zimbabwe) (Kenya) 2003	Not eligible; ICC affiliate member							Not eligible; ICC affiliate member				
(Cricket West Indies) 2007	Did not qualify							3	1	2	0	0
(India) (Sri Lanka) (Bangladesh) 2011	Did not qualify							Did not enter				
(Australia) (New Zealand) 2015	Did not qualify							24	15	9	0	0
(England) (Wales) 2019	Did not qualify							5	1	4	0	0
(India) 2023	Did not qualify							Did not enter				
(South Africa) (Zimbabwe) (Namibia) 2027	Did not qualify							15	6	8	0	1
Total	—N/a	0/14	–	–	–	–	–	47	23	23	0	1

=== CWC Challenge League ===
Cricket World Cup Challenge League record
Year	League	Position	Pld	W	L	T	NR	P/R
2019–2022	Did not qualify							
2024–2026	B	4/6	15	6	8	0	1	Same position
Total	0 Titles	1/2	15	6	8	0	1	—N/a

=== Men's T20 World Cup ===
Men's T20 World Cup record								Qualification record				
Year	Round	Position	Pld	W	L	T	NR	Pld	W	L	T	NR
(South Africa) 2007	Not eligible							Not eligible				
(England) 2009	Not eligible							Not eligible				
(Cricket West Indies) 2010	Not eligible							Not eligible				
(Sri Lanka) 2012	Did not enter							Did not enter				
(Bangladesh) 2014	Did not qualify							4	0	4	0	0
(India) 2016	Did not enter							Did not enter				
(United Arab Emirates) (Oman) 2021	Did not qualify							5	1	4	0	0
(Australia) 2022	Did not qualify							9	6	3	0	0
(United States) (Cricket West Indies) 2024	Did not qualify							4	1	3	0	0
(India) (Sri Lanka) 2026	Did not qualify							6	3	3	0	0
(Australia) (New Zealand) 2028	To be determined							6*	5	1	0	0
Total	—N/a	0/10	–	–	–	–	–	34	16	18	0	0

=== T20 World Cup Global Qualifier ===
Men's T20 World Cup Global Qualifier record
Year	Round	Position	Pld	W	L	T	NR	Qual.
(Ireland) 2008	Not eligible							
(United Arab Emirates) 2010	Not eligible							
(United Arab Emirates) 2012	Did not enter							
(United Arab Emirates) 2013	Did not qualify							
(Ireland) (Scotland) 2015	Did not enter							
(United Arab Emirates) 2019	Did not qualify							
(Oman) 2022	Play-offs	6/8	5	3	2	0	0	DNQ
(To be determined) 2028	To be determined							
Total	0 Titles	1/8	5	3	2	0	0	—N/a

=== T20 World Cup Asia Regional Final ===
T20 World Cup Asia Regional Final record
Year	Round	Position	Pld	W	L	T	NR	Qual.
(Singapore) 2019	Did not qualify							
(Nepal) 2023	Semi-finals	4/8	4	1	3	0	0	DNQ
(Oman) 2025	Did not qualify							
(To be determined) 2027	Qualified							
Total	0 Titles	1/4	4	1	3	0	0	—N/a

=== Other international tournaments ===
CWC Challenge League Play-off (List A)	World Cricket League (LA/ODI/50 overs)
2009 (Division Seven) : Winners (▲); 2009 (Division Six) : Runners-up (▲); 2010 (Division Five) : 3rd place; 2012 (Division Five) : 5th place (▼); 2013 (Division Six) : 5th place

=== Other regional tournaments ===
T20WC Asia Sub-regional Qualifiers (T20I)	ACC Premier Cup (50 overs/T20I)	ACC Challenger Cup (50 overs/T20I)	ACC Trophy
2018: 5th place (DNQ); 2021: Winners (Q); 2024: 3rd place (DNQ); 2026: Runners-up (Q)	2023: 7th place (DNQ); 2023: 8th place (DNQ); 2026: 9th place (DNQ)	2023: Runners-up (Q)	2004: Group stage; 2006: Quarter-finals
ACC Trophy Elite	ACC Twenty20 Cup	ACC Western Region T20	
2008: Group stage; 2010: Qualified; withdrew	2009: 11th place; 2013: Group stage	2019: 3rd place; 2020: Semi-finals	

== Current squad ==
This lists all the players who have played for Bahrain in the past 12 months or has been part of the latest One-day or T20I squad.
Uncapped players are listed in italics

Updated as of 8 August 2026

Name	Age	Batting style	Bowling style	Formats	Notes
Batters
Sohail Ahmed	32	Right-handed	—N/a	One-day & T20I	
Fiaz Ahmed	38	Right-handed	—N/a	One-day & T20I	
Ahmer Bin Nasir	32	Right-handed	—N/a	T20I	
Muhammad Safdar	36	Right-handed	—N/a	One-day & T20I	
Wicket-keepers
Shahbaz Badar	35	Right-handed	—N/a	One-day	
Prashant Kurup	38	Right-handed	—N/a	One-day & T20I	
Yasser Nazeer	36	Right-handed	—N/a	T20I	
All-rounders
Asif Ali	30	Left-handed	Slow left-arm orthodox	One-day & T20I	Captain
Imran Anwar	37	Right-handed	Left-arm medium	One-day & T20I	
Junaid Aziz	32	Right-handed	Right-arm leg break	One-day & T20I	
Amaish Rana	23	Right-handed	Right-arm medium fast	One-day	
Shujaat Rasool	27	Left-handed	Right-arm medium	One-day & T20I	
Spin Bowlers
Abdul Majid	32	Right-handed	Slow left-arm orthodox	One-day & T20I	
Asif Shaikh	32	Right-handed	Slow left-arm orthodox	One-day & T20I	
Yousif Wali	32	Left-handed	Slow left-arm orthodox	T20I	
Pace Bowlers
Rizwan Butt	35	Right-handed	Right-arm medium	One-day & T20I	
Ali Dawood	33	Right-handed	Right-arm medium	One-day & T20I	
Muhammad Salman	31	Right-handed	Slow left-arm orthodox	T20I	
Imran Khan	36	Right-handed	Right-arm medium	T20I	

== Records ==
International Match Summary — Bahrain

Last updated 14 October 2026

Playing Record
Format	M	W	L	T	NR	Inaugural Match
Twenty20 Internationals	135	78	50	4	3	20 January 2019

=== Twenty20 International ===
- Highest team total: 231/2 v. Indonesia on 19 November 2025 at Udayana Cricket Ground, Jimbaran.
- Highest individual score: 105*, Fiaz Ahmed v. Germany on 6 July 2025 at TCA Oval, Blantyre.
- Best individual bowling figures: 6/9, Rizwan Butt v. Malawi on 12 July 2025 at TCA Oval, Blantyre.

Most T20I runs for Bahrain

Player	Runs	Average	Career span
Sohail Ahmed	1,983	42.19	2022–2026
Fiaz Ahmed	1,905	33.42	2019–2026
Prashant Kurup	1,721	25.68	2021–2026
Ahmer Bin Nasir	1,573	27.59	2022–2026
Asif Ali	1,501	26.80	2024–2026

Most T20I wickets for Bahrain

Player	Wickets	Average	Career span
Rizwan Butt	148	15.86	2022–2026
Ali Dawood	135	13.63	2023–2026
Imran Anwar	97	23.72	2019–2026
Abdul Majid	82	20.35	2023–2026
Imran Khan	61	22.80	2022–2026

T20I record versus other nations

Records complete to T20I #4197. Last updated 14 October 2026.

Opponent	M	W	L	T	NR	First match	First win
v. Full Members
Ireland	1	0	1	0	0	19 February 2022	
vs Associate Members
Bhutan	8	8	0	0	0	23 November 2024	23 November 2024
Cambodia	2	2	0	0	0	16 April 2024	16 April 2024
Canada	3	1	2	0	0	24 February 2022	17 November 2022
Germany	2	2	0	0	0	18 February 2022	18 February 2022
Hong Kong	6	3	2	1	0	8 March 2023	31 October 2023
Indonesia	8	7	1	0	0	19 February 2025	19 February 2025
Japan	2	0	1	1	0	26 February 2026	
Kenya	2	1	1	0	0	31 July 2026	31 July 2026
Kuwait	16	4	11	1	0	23 January 2019	11 March 2023
Malawi	7	7	0	0	0	7 July 2025	7 July 2025
Malaysia	13	7	6	0	0	15 December 2022	23 December 2022
Maldives	3	3	0	0	0	21 January 2019	21 January 2019
Mongolia	1	1	0	0	0	11 October 2026	11 October 2026
Myanmar	1	1	0	0	0	8 October 2026	8 October 2026
Oman	8	2	6	0	0	23 February 2020	15 November 2022
Philippines	1	1	0	0	0	22 February 2022	22 February 2022
Qatar	14	4	9	0	1	24 January 2019	25 February 2020
Rwanda	4	4	0	0	0	18 July 2025	18 July 2025
Saudi Arabia	8	6	2	0	0	20 January 2019	20 January 2019
Singapore	7	5	0	1	1	16 December 2022	16 December 2022
Tanzania	4	2	2	0	0	9 March 2024	9 March 2024
Thailand	5	3	1	0	1	22 November 2024	30 November 2025
Uganda	2	1	1	0	0	28 October 2024	28 October 2024
United Arab Emirates	6	2	4	0	0	21 February 2022	21 February 2022
Vanuatu	1	1	0	0	0	10 March 2024	10 March 2024

== See also ==
- List of Bahrain Twenty20 International cricketers
- Bahrain women's national cricket team
