= Mohammad Isam =

Bangladeshi cricket journalist

Mohammad Isam (born 6 May 1984) is a Bangladeshi cricket journalist, author, and former cricketer. A left-arm spinner, he played domestic cricket from 2001 to 2010. Since 2012, he has worked as a correspondent for Cricinfo.

== Early life ==
Isam was born in Dhaka to Mohammad Yahya and Sayeeda Naila Lopa. He attended North South University.

== Career ==
Between 2001 and 2010, Isam played in Dhaka's domestic cricket circuit, which included a season in the Dhaka Premier League. Concurrently, he worked as a sports sub-editor for The Daily Star from 2006 to 2012.

During England's tour of Bangladesh in 2010, prior to the Ashes series, England coach Andy Flower selected Isam as a net bowler to help improve Kevin Pietersen's batting against left-arm spin. In 2012, Isam joined ESPNcricinfo.
