= International cricket in 2013 =

Cricket season

The 2013 international cricket season is from April 2013 to September 2013.

== Season overview ==
International tours
Start date	Home team	Away team	Results [Matches]		
Start date	Home team	Away team	Test	ODI	T20I
17 April 2013	Zimbabwe	Bangladesh	1–1 [2]	2–1 [3]	1–1 [2]
16 May 2013	England	New Zealand	2–0 [2]	1–2 [3]	0–1 [2]
17 May 2013	Scotland	Pakistan	—	0–1 [2]	—
23 May 2013	Ireland	Pakistan	—	0–1 [2]	—
31 May 2013	Netherlands	South Africa	—	0–1 [1]	—
10 July 2013	England	Australia	3–0 [5]	1–2 [5]	1–1 [2]
14 July 2013	West Indies	Pakistan	—	1–3 [5]	0–2 [2]
20 July 2013	Sri Lanka	South Africa	—	4–1 [5]	1–2 [3]
24 July 2013	Zimbabwe	India	—	0–5 [5]	—
23 August 2013	Zimbabwe	Pakistan	1–1 [2]	1–2 [3]	0–2 [2]
3 September 2013	Ireland	England	—	0–1 [1]	—
3 September 2013	Scotland	Australia	—	0–1 [1]	—
International tournaments
Dates	Tournament			Winners	
6 June 2013	(England) ICC Champions Trophy			India	
28 June 2013	(Cricket West Indies) Triangular Series			India	
Women's tours
Start date	Home team	Away team	Results [Matches]		
Start date	Home team	Away team	Test	ODI	T20I
1 July 2013	England	Pakistan	—	2–0 [2]	1–1 [2]
8 July 2013	(England) Ireland	Pakistan	—	0–1 [1]	0–2 [2]
16 July 2013	Ireland	Pakistan	—	0–2 [2]	0–1 [1]
5 August 2013	England	Australia	0–0 [1]	2–1 [3]	3–0 [3]
12 September 2013	South Africa	Bangladesh	—	3–0 [3]	3–0 [3]
Minor tours
Start date	Home team	Away team	Results [Matches]		
Start date	Home team	Away team	FC	List A	T20
11 April 2013	Namibia	Netherlands	1–0 [1]	0–2 [2]	—
30 June 2013	Scotland	Kenya	1–0 [1]	2–0 [2]	2–0 [2]
1 July 2013	Netherlands	Ireland	0–1 [1]	0–1 [2]	—
1 August 2013	Canada	UAE	0–0 [1]	0–2 [2]	0–2 [2]
4 August 2013	Namibia	Afghanistan	0–1 [1]	0–2 [2]	—
22 August 2013	Canada	Netherlands	1–0 [1]	0–1 [2]	—
6 September 2013	Ireland	Scotland	1–0 [1]	2–0 [2]	—
Other minor series
Dates	Series			Winners	
6 April 2013	(Botswana) World Cricket League Division Seven			Nigeria	
19 April 2013	Kenya vs Netherlands T20I match			Kenya	
20 April 2013	(Namibia) Twenty20 Quadrangular			Namibia	
28 April 2013	(Bermuda) World Cricket League Division Three			Nepal	
21 July 2013	(Jersey) World Cricket League Division Six			Jersey	

== Rankings ==
The following are the rankings at the start of the season.

ICC Test Championship 26 March 2013
Rank	Team	Matches	Points	Rating
1	South Africa	36	4601	128
2	England	45	5137	114
3	India	42	4714	112
4	Australia	47	5191	110
5	Pakistan	33	3444	104
6	Sri Lanka	39	3574	92
7	West Indies	34	3112	92
8	New Zealand	34	2805	83
9	Bangladesh	18	20	1

ICC ODI Championship 28 March 2013
Rank	Team	Matches	Points	Rating
1	India	38	4514	119
2	England	33	3849	117
3	Australia	37	4285	116
4	South Africa	26	2940	113
5	Sri Lanka	41	4446	108
6	Pakistan	36	3824	106
7	West Indies	33	2823	86
8	New Zealand	26	2124	82
9	Bangladesh	23	1856	81
10	Zimbabwe	17	808	47
11	Ireland	6	207	35
12	Netherlands	4	63	16
13	Kenya	4	45	11

ICC T20I Championship 31 March 2013
Rank	Team	Matches	Points	Rating
1	Sri Lanka	18	1979	132
2	West Indies	20	2008	126
3	India	18	1789	119
4	Pakistan	29	2491	119
5	England	25	2235	118
6	South Africa	22	1934	114
7	Australia	23	1843	102
8	New Zealand	24	1867	98
9	Bangladesh	12	742	82
10	Ireland	12	659	82
11	Zimbabwe	12	373	41

Notes

- Zimbabwe are currently unranked in Tests, as they have played insufficient matches. They have 263 points and a rating of 38.

== April ==
=== World Cricket League Division Seven ===
Pos	Team	Pld	W	L	T	NR	Pts	NRR	Qualification
1	Vanuatu	5	5	0	0	0	10	1.918	Qualified for 2013 Division Six and final
2	Nigeria	5	3	2	0	0	6	0.722	Qualified for 2013 Division Six and final
3	Fiji	5	3	2	0	0	6	0.702	3rd place playoff
4	Botswana	5	2	2	1	0	5	−0.529	3rd place playoff
5	Ghana	5	1	4	0	0	2	−0.593	5th place playoff
6	Germany	5	0	4	1	0	1	−2.042	5th place playoff

Group stage
No.	Date	Team 1	Captain 1	Team 2	Captain 2	Venue	Result
Match 1	6 April	Vanuatu	Andrew Mansale	Germany	Asif Khan	Botswana Cricket Association Oval 2, Gaborone	Vanuatu by 101 runs
Match 2	6 April	Ghana	Peter Ananya	Botswana	Karabo Modise	Lobatse Cricket Ground, Lobatse	Botswana by 3 wickets
Match 3	6 April	Nigeria	Kunle Adegbola	Fiji	Jone Seuvou	Botswana Cricket Association Oval 1, Gaborone	Fiji by 3 wickets
Match 4	7 April	Ghana	Peter Ananya	Nigeria	Kunle Adegbola	Botswana Cricket Association Oval 1, Gaborone	Nigeria by 6 wickets
Match 5	7 April	Fiji	Jone Seuvou	Germany	Asif Khan	Lobatse Cricket Ground, Lobatse	Fiji by 163 runs
Match 6	7 April	Vanuatu	Andrew Mansale	Botswana	Karabo Modise	Botswana Cricket Association Oval 2, Gaborone	Vanuatu by 23 runs
Match 7	9 April	Fiji	Jone Seuvou	Vanuatu	Andrew Mansale	Botswana Cricket Association Oval 1, Gaborone	Vanuatu by 6 wickets
Match 8	9 April	Germany	Asif Khan	Ghana	Peter Ananya	Lobatse Cricket Ground, Lobatse	Ghana by 4 wickets
Match 9	9 April	Nigeria	Kunle Adegbola	Botswana	Karabo Modise	Botswana Cricket Association Oval 2, Gaborone	Nigeria by 171 runs
Match 10	10 April	Vanuatu	Andrew Mansale	Nigeria	Kunle Adegbola	Lobatse Cricket Ground, Lobatse	Vanuatu by 74 runs
Match 11	10 April	Germany	Asif Khan	Botswana	Karabo Modise	Botswana Cricket Association Oval 1, Gaborone	Match tied
Match 12	10 April	Fiji	Jone Seuvou	Ghana	Peter Ananya	Botswana Cricket Association Oval 2, Gaborone	Fiji by 18 runs
Match 13	12 April	Ghana	James Vifah	Vanuatu	Andrew Mansale	Botswana Cricket Association Oval 1, Gaborone	Vanuatu by 8 wickets
Match 14	12 April	Nigeria	Kunle Adegbola	Germany	Asif Khan	Botswana Cricket Association Oval 2, Gaborone	Nigeria 160 runs
Match 15	12 April	Botswana	Karabo Modise	Fiji	Jone Seuvou	Lobatse Cricket Ground, Lobatse	Botswana by 22 runs
Playoffs
5th place playoff	13 April	Ghana	James Vifah	Germany	Rana-Javed Iqbal	Lobatse Cricket Ground, Lobatse	Ghana by 8 runs
3rd place playoff	13 April	Fiji	Josefa Rika	Botswana	Karabo Modise	Botswana Cricket Association Oval 2, Gaborone	Botswana by 3 wickets (D/L)
Final	13 April	Vanuatu	Andrew Mansale	Nigeria	Kunle Adegbola	Botswana Cricket Association Oval 1, Gaborone	Nigeria by 6 wickets (D/L)

==== Final Placings ====
Pos	Team	Status
1st	Nigeria	Promoted to Division Six for 2013
2nd	Vanuatu	Promoted to Division Six for 2013
3rd	Botswana	Relegated to regional tournaments
4th	Fiji	Relegated to regional tournaments
5th	Ghana	Relegated to regional tournaments
6th	Germany	Relegated to regional tournaments

=== The Netherlands in Namibia ===
2011–13 ICC Intercontinental Cup
No.	Date	Home captain	Away captain	Venue	Result
First-class	11–14 April	Sarel Burger	Peter Borren	Wanderers Cricket Ground, Windhoek	Namibia by 82 runs
2011–13 ICC World Cricket League Championship
No.	Date	Home captain	Away captain	Venue	Result
List A	16 April	Sarel Burger	Peter Borren	Wanderers Cricket Ground, Windhoek	Netherlands by 31 runs
List A	18 April	Sarel Burger	Peter Borren	Wanderers Cricket Ground, Windhoek	Netherlands by 1 wicket

=== Bangladesh in Zimbabwe ===
Test series
No.	Date	Home captain	Away captain	Venue	Result
Test 2086	17–21 April	Brendan Taylor	Mushfiqur Rahim	Harare Sports Club, Harare	Zimbabwe by 335 runs
Test 2087	25–29 April	Brendan Taylor	Mushfiqur Rahim	Harare Sports Club, Harare	Bangladesh by 143 runs
ODI series
No.	Date	Home captain	Away captain	Venue	Result
ODI 3353	3 May	Brendan Taylor	Mushfiqur Rahim	Queens Sports Club, Bulawayo	Bangladesh by 121 runs
ODI 3354	5 May	Brendan Taylor	Mushfiqur Rahim	Queens Sports Club, Bulawayo	Zimbabwe by 6 wickets
ODI 3355	8 May	Brendan Taylor	Mushfiqur Rahim	Queens Sports Club, Bulawayo	Zimbabwe by 7 wickets
T20I series
No.	Date	Home captain	Away captain	Venue	Result
T20I 315	11 May	Brendan Taylor	Mushfiqur Rahim	Queens Sports Club, Bulawayo	Zimbabwe by 6 runs
T20I 316	12 May	Brendan Taylor	Mushfiqur Rahim	Queens Sports Club, Bulawayo	Bangladesh by 34 runs

=== Kenya vs Netherlands in Namibia ===
Only T20I
No.	Date	Netherlands captain	Kenya captain	Venue	Result
T20I 313	19 April	Michael Swart	Collins Obuya	Wanderers Cricket Ground, Windhoek	Kenya by 5 wickets

=== Twenty20 Quadrangular in Namibia ===
Pos	Team	Pld	W	L	T	NR	Pts	NRR
1	Kenya	3	2	1	0	0	8	1.200
2	Namibia	3	2	1	0	0	8	0.675
3	South Africa Emerging Players	3	2	1	0	0	8	0.472
4	Netherlands	3	0	3	0	0	0	−2.274

Twenty20 series
No.	Date	Team 1	Captain 1	Team 2	Captain 2	Venue	Result
Group stage
T20I 314	20 April	Kenya	Collins Obuya	Netherlands	Michael Swart	Wanderers Cricket Ground, Windhoek	Kenya by 7 wickets
Match 2	20 April	Namibia	Sarel Burger	South Africa Emerging Players	Jean Symes	Wanderers Cricket Ground, Windhoek	South Africa Emerging Players by 7 wickets
Match 3	21 April	Kenya	Collins Obuya	South Africa Emerging Players	Jean Symes	Wanderers Cricket Ground, Windhoek	Kenya by 5 wickets
Match 4	21 April	Namibia	Sarel Burger	Netherlands	Michael Swart	Wanderers Cricket Ground, Windhoek	Namibia by 45 runs
Match 5	23 April	Netherlands	Michael Swart	South Africa Emerging Players	Jean Symes	Wanderers Cricket Ground, Windhoek	South Africa Emerging Players by 22 runs
Match 6	23 April	Namibia	Sarel Burger	Kenya	Collins Obuya	Wanderers Cricket Ground, Windhoek	Namibia by 8 wickets
3rd place play-off
3rd place play-off	24 April	Netherlands	Michael Swart	South Africa Emerging Players	Jean Symes	Wanderers Cricket Ground, Windhoek	Netherlands by 42 runs
Final
Final	24 April	Namibia	Sarel Burger	Kenya	Collins Obuya	Wanderers Cricket Ground, Windhoek	Namibia by 5 wickets

=== World Cricket League Division Three ===
Pos	Team	Pld	W	L	T	NR	Pts	NRR
1	Uganda	5	4	1	0	0	8	1.091
2	Nepal	5	3	2	0	0	6	0.715
3	United States	5	3	2	0	0	6	0.456
4	Bermuda	5	3	2	0	0	6	−0.683
5	Oman	5	2	3	0	0	4	0.048
6	Italy	5	0	5	0	0	0	−1.675

Source: ESPNcricinfo

Group stage
No.	Date	Team 1	Captain 1	Team 2	Captain 2	Venue	Result
Match 1	28 April	Bermuda	Steven Outerbridge	Uganda	Davis Arinaitwe	National Stadium, Hamilton	Uganda by 114 runs
Match 2	28 April	Italy	Alessandro Bonora	Oman	Vaibhav Wategaonkar	St. David's Cricket Club Ground, St. David's Island	Oman by 7 wickets
Match 3	28 April	Nepal	Paras Khadka	United States	Steve Massiah	Somerset Cricket Club, Somerset	United States by 94 runs
Match 4	29 April	Bermuda	Steven Outerbridge	Oman	Vaibhav Wategaonkar	St. David's Cricket Club Ground, St. David's Island	Bermuda by 34 runs
Match 5	29 April	Italy	Alessandro Bonora	United States	Steve Massiah	National Stadium, Hamilton	United States by 74 runs
Match 6	29 April	Nepal	Paras Khadka	Uganda	Davis Arinaitwe	Somerset Cricket Club, Somerset	Uganda by 6 wickets
Match 7	1 May	Bermuda	Steven Outerbridge	Nepal	Paras Khadka	St. David's Cricket Club Ground, St. David's Island	Nepal by 8 wickets
Match 8	1 May	Italy	Alessandro Bonora	Uganda	Davis Arinaitwe	National Stadium, Hamilton	Uganda by 23 runs
Match 9	1 May	Oman	Vaibhav Wategaonkar	United States	Steve Massiah	Somerset Cricket Club, Somerset	United States by 2 wickets
Match 10	2 May	Bermuda	Steven Outerbridge	Italy	Alessandro Bonora	Somerset Cricket Club, Somerset	Bermuda by 60 runs
Match 11	2 May	Nepal	Paras Khadka	Oman	Vaibhav Wategaonkar	National Stadium, Hamilton	Nepal by 28 runs
Match 12	2 May	Uganda	Davis Arinaitwe	United States	Steve Massiah	St. David's Cricket Club Ground, St. David's Island	Uganda by 82 runs
Match 13	4 May	Bermuda	Steven Outerbridge	United States	Steve Massiah	National Stadium, Hamilton	Bermuda by 5 wickets
Match 14	4 May	Italy	Alessandro Bonora	Nepal	Paras Khadka	St. David's Cricket Club Ground, St. David's Island	Nepal by 8 wickets
Match 15	4 May	Oman	Vaibhav Wategaonkar	Uganda	Davis Arinaitwe	Somerset Cricket Club, Somerset	Oman by 7 wickets
Playoffs
3rd place playoff	5 May	Italy	Alessandro Bonora	Oman	Vaibhav Wategaonkar	St. David's Cricket Club Ground, St. David's Island	Oman by 5 wickets
5th place playoff	5 May	Bermuda	Steven Outerbridge	United States	Steve Massiah	Somerset Cricket Club, Somerset	United States by 30 runs
Final	5 May	Nepal	Paras Khadka	Uganda	Davis Arinaitwe	National Stadium, Hamilton	Nepal by 5 wickets

==== Final Placings ====
Pos	Team	Status
1st	Nepal	Promoted to the 2014 World Cup Qualifier.
2nd	Uganda	Promoted to the 2014 World Cup Qualifier.
3rd	United States	Remained in Division Three for 2014
4th	Bermuda	Remained in Division Three for 2014
5th	Oman	Relegated to Division Four for 2014
6th	Italy	Relegated to Division Four for 2014

== May ==
=== New Zealand in England ===
Test series
No.	Date	Home captain	Away captain	Venue	Result
Test 2088	16–20 May	Alastair Cook	Brendon McCullum	Lord's, London	England by 170 runs
Test 2089	24–28 May	Alastair Cook	Brendon McCullum	Headingley, Leeds	England by 247 runs
ODI series
No.	Date	Home captain	Away captain	Venue	Result
ODI 3360	31 May	Alastair Cook	Brendon McCullum	Lord's, London	New Zealand by 5 wickets
ODI 3361	2 June	Alastair Cook	Brendon McCullum	The Rose Bowl, Southampton	New Zealand by 86 runs
ODI 3362	5 June	Alastair Cook	Brendon McCullum	Trent Bridge, Nottingham	England by 34 runs
T20I series
No.	Date	Home captain	Away captain	Venue	Result
T20I 317	25 June	Eoin Morgan	Brendon McCullum	The Oval, London	New Zealand by 5 runs
T20I 318	27 June	James Tredwell	Brendon McCullum	The Oval, London	No result

=== Pakistan in Scotland ===
T20I series
No.	Date	Home captain	Away captain	Venue	Result
ODI 3356	17 May	Kyle Coetzer	Misbah-ul-Haq	Grange Cricket Club Ground, Edinburgh	Pakistan by 96 runs
ODI 3356a	19 May	Kyle Coetzer	Misbah-ul-Haq	Grange Cricket Club Ground, Edinburgh	Match abandoned

=== Pakistan in Ireland ===
ODI series
No.	Date	Home captain	Away captain	Venue	Result
ODI 3357	23 May	William Porterfield	Misbah-ul-Haq	Clontarf Cricket Club Ground, Dublin	Match tied (D/L)
ODI 3358	26 May	William Porterfield	Misbah-ul-Haq	Clontarf Cricket Club Ground, Dublin	Pakistan by 2 wickets

=== South Africa in the Netherlands ===
Only ODI
No.	Date	Home captain	Away captain	Venue	Result
ODI 3359	31 May	Peter Borren	AB de Villiers	VRA Ground, Amstelveen	South Africa by 83 runs

== June ==
=== ICC Champions Trophy ===
==== Group stage ====
Group A
Pos	Team	Pld	W	L	T	NR	Pts	NRR
1	England	3	2	1	0	0	4	0.308
2	Sri Lanka	3	2	1	0	0	4	−0.197
3	New Zealand	3	1	1	0	1	3	0.777
4	Australia	3	0	2	0	1	1	−0.680

Source: EspnCricinfo

Group B
Pos	Team	Pld	W	L	T	NR	Pts	NRR
1	India	3	3	0	0	0	6	0.938
2	South Africa	3	1	1	1	0	3	0.325
3	West Indies	3	1	1	1	0	3	−0.075
4	Pakistan	3	0	3	0	0	0	−1.035

Source: EspnCricinfo

No.	Date	Team 1	Captain 1	Team 2	Captain 2	Venue	Result
Group stage
ODI 3363	6 June	India	Mahendra Singh Dhoni	South Africa	AB de Villiers	Sophia Gardens, Cardiff	India by 26 runs
ODI 3364	7 June	Pakistan	Misbah-ul-Haq	West Indies	Dwayne Bravo	The Oval, London	West Indies by 2 wickets
ODI 3365	8 June	England	Alastair Cook	Australia	George Bailey	Edgbaston, Birmingham	England by 48 runs
ODI 3366	9 June	New Zealand	Brendon McCullum	Sri Lanka	Angelo Mathews	Sophia Gardens, Cardiff	New Zealand by 1 wicket
ODI 3367	10 June	Pakistan	Misbah-ul-Haq	South Africa	AB de Villiers	Edgbaston, Birmingham	South Africa by 67 runs
ODI 3368	11 June	India	Mahendra Singh Dhoni	West Indies	Dwayne Bravo	The Oval, London	India by 8 wickets
ODI 3369	12 June	Australia	George Bailey	New Zealand	Brendon McCullum	Edgbaston, Birmingham	No result
ODI 3370	13 June	England	Alastair Cook	Sri Lanka	Angelo Mathews	The Oval, London	Sri Lanka by 7 wickets
ODI 3371	14 June	South Africa	AB de Villiers	West Indies	Dwayne Bravo	Sophia Gardens, Cardiff	Match tied (D/L)
ODI 3372	15 June	India	Mahendra Singh Dhoni	Pakistan	Misbah-ul-Haq	Edgbaston, Birmingham	India by 8 wickets (D/L)
ODI 3373	16 June	England	Alastair Cook	New Zealand	Brendon McCullum	Sophia Gardens, Cardiff	England by 10 runs
ODI 3374	17 June	Australia	George Bailey	Sri Lanka	Angelo Mathews	The Oval, London	Sri Lanka by 20 runs
Semi-finals
ODI 3375	19 June	England	Alastair Cook	South Africa	AB de Villiers	The Oval, London	England by 7 wickets
ODI 3376	20 June	India	Mahendra Singh Dhoni	Sri Lanka	Angelo Mathews	Sophia Gardens, Cardiff	India by 8 wickets
Final
ODI 3377	23 June	England	Alastair Cook	India	Mahendra Singh Dhoni	Edgbaston, Birmingham	India by 5 runs

=== West Indies Triangular Series ===
Pos	Team	Pld	W	L	Pts	NRR	Qualification
1	India	4	2	2	10	0.054	Advanced to the final
2	Sri Lanka	4	2	2	9	0.348	Advanced to the final
3	West Indies	4	2	2	9	−0.383	

Source: ESPNCricinfo

ODI series
No.	Date	Team 1	Captain 1	Team 2	Captain 2	Venue	Result
Group stage
ODI 3378	28 June	West Indies	Dwayne Bravo	Sri Lanka	Angelo Mathews	Sabina Park, Kingston, Jamaica	West Indies by 6 wickets
ODI 3380	30 June	West Indies	Kieron Pollard	India	Mahendra Singh Dhoni	Sabina Park, Kingston, Jamaica	West Indies by 1 wicket
ODI 3382	2 July	India	Virat Kohli	Sri Lanka	Angelo Mathews	Sabina Park, Kingston, Jamaica	Sri Lanka by 161 runs
ODI 3383	5 July	West Indies	Dwayne Bravo	India	Virat Kohli	Queen's Park Oval, Port of Spain, Trinidad	India by 102 runs (D/L)
ODI 3385	7 July	West Indies	Kieron Pollard	Sri Lanka	Angelo Mathews	Queen's Park Oval, Port of Spain, Trinidad	Sri Lanka by 39 runs (D/L)
ODI 3387	9 July	India	Virat Kohli	Sri Lanka	Angelo Mathews	Queen's Park Oval, Port of Spain, Trinidad	India by 81 runs (D/L)
Final
ODI 3388	11 July	India	Mahendra Singh Dhoni	Sri Lanka	Angelo Mathews	Queen's Park Oval, Port of Spain, Trinidad	India by 1 wicket

=== Kenya in Scotland ===
2011–13 ICC World Cricket League Championship
No.	Date	Home captain	Away captain	Venue	Result
ODI 3379	30 June	Kyle Coetzer	Collins Obuya	Mannofield Park, Aberdeen	Scotland by 12 runs
ODI 3381	2 July	Kyle Coetzer	Collins Obuya	Mannofield Park, Aberdeen	Scotland by 4 wickets (D/L)
T20I series
No.	Date	Home captain	Away captain	Venue	Result
T20I 319	4 July	Preston Mommsen	Collins Obuya	Mannofield Park, Aberdeen	Scotland by 35 runs
T20I 320	5 July	Preston Mommsen	Collins Obuya	Mannofield Park, Aberdeen	Scotland by 7 wickets
2011–13 ICC Intercontinental Cup
No.	Date	Home captain	Away captain	Venue	Result
First-class	7–10 July	Kyle Coetzer	Collins Obuya	Mannofield Park, Aberdeen	Scotland by 152 runs

== July ==
=== Ireland in the Netherlands ===
2011–13 ICC Intercontinental Cup
No.	Date	Home captain	Away captain	Venue	Result
First-class	1–4 July	Peter Borren	Kevin O'Brien	Sportpark Het Schootsveld, Deventer	Ireland by 279 runs
2011–13 ICC World Cricket League Championship
No.	Date	Home captain	Away captain	Venue	Result
ODI 3384	7 July	Peter Borren	William Porterfield	VRA Ground, Amstelveen	Ireland by 88 runs
ODI 3386	9 July	Peter Borren	William Porterfield	VRA Ground, Amstelveen	Match tied

=== Pakistan women in England ===
WODI Series
No.	Date	Home captain	Away captain	Venue	Result
WODI 876	1 July	Charlotte Edwards	Sana Mir	Louth Cricket Club, Louth	England by 111 runs
WODI 877	3 July	Charlotte Edwards	Sana Mir	Haslegrave Ground, Loughborough	England by 6 wickets
WT20I Series
No.	Date	Home captain	Away captain	Venue	Result
WT20I 200	5 July	Charlotte Edwards	Sana Mir	Haslegrave Ground, Loughborough	England by 70 runs
WT20I 201	5 July	Charlotte Edwards	Sana Mir	Haslegrave Ground, Loughborough	Pakistan by 1 run

=== Pakistan women against Ireland in England ===
WT20I Series
No.	Date	Home captain	Away captain	Venue	Result
WT20I 202	8 July	Isobel Joyce	Sana Mir	Scorers, Shirley	Pakistan by 4 wickets
WT20I 203	8 July	Isobel Joyce	Sana Mir	Scorers, Shirley	Pakistan by 10 wickets
WODI Match
No.	Date	Home captain	Away captain	Venue	Result
WODI 878	10 July	Isobel Joyce	Sana Mir	Scorers, Shirley	Pakistan by 8 wickets

=== Australia in England ===
Test series
No.	Date	Home captain	Away captain	Venue	Result
Test 2090	10–14 July	Alastair Cook	Michael Clarke	Trent Bridge, Nottingham	England by 14 runs
Test 2091	18–22 July	Alastair Cook	Michael Clarke	Lord's, London	England by 347 runs
Test 2092	1–5 August	Alastair Cook	Michael Clarke	Old Trafford, Manchester	Match drawn
Test 2093	9–13 August	Alastair Cook	Michael Clarke	Riverside Ground, Chester-le-Street	England by 74 runs
Test 2094	21–25 August	Alastair Cook	Michael Clarke	The Oval, London	Match drawn
T20I series
No.	Date	Home captain	Away captain	Venue	Result
T20I 328	29 August	Stuart Broad	George Bailey	The Rose Bowl, Southampton	Australia by 39 runs
T20I 329	31 August	Stuart Broad	George Bailey	Riverside Ground, Chester-le-Street	England by 27 runs
ODI series
No.	Date	Home captain	Away captain	Venue	Result
ODI 3410a	6 September	Eoin Morgan	Michael Clarke	Headingley, Leeds	No result
ODI 3412	8 September	Eoin Morgan	Michael Clarke	Old Trafford, Manchester	Australia by 88 runs
ODI 3414	11 September	Eoin Morgan	Michael Clarke	Edgbaston, Birmingham	No result
ODI 3415	14 September	Eoin Morgan	Michael Clarke	Sophia Gardens, Cardiff	England by 3 wickets
ODI 3416	16 September	Eoin Morgan	Michael Clarke	The Rose Bowl, Southampton	Australia by 49 runs

=== Pakistan in the West Indies ===
ODI series
No.	Date	Home captain	Away captain	Venue	Result
ODI 3389	14 July	Dwayne Bravo	Misbah-ul-Haq	Providence Stadium, Providence, Guyana	Pakistan by 126 runs
ODI 3390	16 July	Dwayne Bravo	Misbah-ul-Haq	Providence Stadium, Providence, Guyana	West Indies by 37 runs
ODI 3391	19 July	Dwayne Bravo	Misbah-ul-Haq	Beausejour Stadium, Gros Islet, St Lucia	Match tied
ODI 3393	21 July	Dwayne Bravo	Misbah-ul-Haq	Beausejour Stadium, Gros Islet, St Lucia	Pakistan by 6 wickets (D/L)
ODI 3396	24 July	Dwayne Bravo	Misbah-ul-Haq	Beausejour Stadium, Gros Islet, St Lucia	Pakistan by 4 wickets
T20I series
No.	Date	Home captain	Away captain	Venue	Result
T20I 321	27 July	Darren Sammy	Mohammad Hafeez	Arnos Vale Ground, Kingstown, St Vincent	Pakistan by 2 wickets
T20I 322	28 July	Darren Sammy	Mohammad Hafeez	Arnos Vale Ground, Kingstown, St Vincent	Pakistan by 11 runs

=== Pakistan women in Ireland ===
WT20I Match
No.	Date	Home captain	Away captain	Venue	Result
WT20I 204	16 July	Isobel Joyce	Sana Mir	YMCA Cricket Club, Dublin	Pakistan by 38 runs
WODI Series
No.	Date	Home captain	Away captain	Venue	Result
WODI 879	7 July	Isobel Joyce	Sana Mir	Observatory Lane, Dublin	Pakistan by 157 runs
WODI 880	19 July	Isobel Joyce	Sana Mir	YMCA Cricket Club, Dublin	Pakistan by 89 runs

=== South Africa in Sri Lanka ===
ODI series
No.	Date	Home captain	Away captain	Venue	Result
ODI 3392	20 July	Dinesh Chandimal	AB de Villiers	R. Premadasa Stadium, Colombo	Sri Lanka by 180 runs
ODI 3394	23 July	Dinesh Chandimal	AB de Villiers	R. Premadasa Stadium, Colombo	Sri Lanka by 17 runs (D/L)
ODI 3398	26 July	Angelo Mathews	AB de Villiers	Pallekele International Cricket Stadium, Pallekele	South Africa by 56 runs
ODI 3400	28 July	Angelo Mathews	AB de Villiers	Pallekele International Cricket Stadium, Pallekele	Sri Lanka by 8 wickets
ODI 3401	31 July	Angelo Mathews	AB de Villiers	R. Premadasa Stadium, Colombo	Sri Lanka by 128 runs
T20I series
No.	Date	Home captain	Away captain	Venue	Result
T20I 323	2 August	Dinesh Chandimal	Faf du Plessis	R. Premadasa Stadium, Colombo	South Africa by 12 runs
T20I 324	4 August	Dinesh Chandimal	Faf du Plessis	Mahinda Rajapaksa International Stadium, Hambantota	South Africa by 22 runs
T20I 325	6 August	Dinesh Chandimal	Faf du Plessis	Mahinda Rajapaksa International Stadium, Hambantota	Sri Lanka by 6 wickets

=== World Cricket League Division Six ===
Pos	Team	Pld	W	L	T	NR	Pts	NRR
1	Jersey	5	5	0	0	0	10	1.438
2	Nigeria	5	4	1	0	0	8	0.815
3	Vanuatu	5	3	2	0	0	6	0.531
4	Argentina	5	2	3	0	0	4	−0.868
5	Bahrain	5	1	4	0	0	2	−0.580
6	Kuwait	5	0	5	0	0	0	−1.088

Group stage
No.	Date	Team 1	Captain 1	Team 2	Captain 2	Venue	Result
Match 1	21 July	Argentina	Billy MacDermott	Bahrain	Yaser Sadeq	FB Fields, St. Clement	Argentina by 3 wickets
Match 2	21 July	Jersey	Peter Gough	Kuwait	Hisham Mirza	Grainville Cricket Ground, St. Saviour	Jersey by 6 wickets
Match 3	21 July	Nigeria	Kunle Adegbola	Vanuatu	Andrew Mansale	Les Quennevais, St. Brélade	Nigeria by 6 runs
Match 4	22 July	Argentina	Billy MacDermott	Vanuatu	Andrew Mansale	FB Fields, St. Clement	Vanuatu by 6 wickets
Match 5	22 July	Jersey	Peter Gough	Bahrain	Yaser Sadeq	Les Quennevais, St. Brélade	Jersey by 7 wickets
Match 6	22 July	Kuwait	Hisham Mirza	Nigeria	Kunle Adegbola	Grainville Cricket Ground, St. Saviour	Nigeria by 111 runs
Match 7	24 July	Argentina	Billy MacDermott	Kuwait	Hisham Mirza	Farmers Cricket Club Ground, St. Martin	Argentina by 1 wicket
Match 8	24 July	Bahrain	Yaser Sadeq	Vanuatu	Andrew Mansale	Grainville Cricket Ground, St. Saviour	Vanuatu by 35 runs
Match 9	24 July	Jersey	Peter Gough	Nigeria	Kunle Adegbola	FB Fields, St. Clement	Jersey by 6 wickets
Match 10	25 July	Bahrain	Yaser Sadeq	Nigeria	Kunle Adegbola	Farmers Cricket Club Ground, St. Martin	Nigeria by 8 wickets
Match 11	25 July	Jersey	Peter Gough	Argentina	Billy MacDermott	Grainville Cricket Ground, St. Saviour	Jersey by 8 wickets
Match 12	25 July	Kuwait	Hisham Mirza	Vanuatu	Andrew Mansale	FB Fields, St. Clement	Vanuatu by 5 wickets
Match 13	27 July	Argentina	Billy MacDermott	Nigeria	Kunle Adegbola	Grainville Cricket Ground, St. Saviour	No result
Match 14	27 July	Bahrain	Yaser Sadeq	Kuwait	Hisham Mirza	FB Fields, St. Clement	No result
Match 15	27 July	Jersey	Peter Gough	Vanuatu	Andrew Mansale	Farmers Cricket Club Ground, St. Martin	No result
Replay Match 13	28 July	Argentina	Billy MacDermott	Nigeria	Kunle Adegbola	Grainville Cricket Ground, St. Saviour	Nigeria by 8 wickets
Replay Match 14	28 July	Bahrain	Yaser Sadeq	Kuwait	Hisham Mirza	FB Fields, St. Clement	Bahrain by 15 runs
Replay Match 15	28 July	Jersey	Peter Gough	Vanuatu	Andrew Mansale	Farmers Cricket Club Ground, St. Martin	Jersey by 7 wickets

==== Final Placings ====
Pos	Team	Status
1st	Jersey	Promoted to 2014 Division Five
2nd	Nigeria	Promoted to 2014 Division Five
3rd	Vanuatu	Remain in 2015 Division Six
4th	Argentina	Relegated to Regional tournaments
5th	Bahrain	Relegated to Regional tournaments
6th	Kuwait	Relegated to Regional tournaments

=== India in Zimbabwe ===
ODI series
No.	Date	Home captain	Away captain	Venue	Result
ODI 3395	24 July	Brendan Taylor	Virat Kohli	Harare Sports Club, Harare	India by 6 wickets
ODI 3397	26 July	Brendan Taylor	Virat Kohli	Harare Sports Club, Harare	India by 58 runs
ODI 3399	28 July	Brendan Taylor	Virat Kohli	Harare Sports Club, Harare	India by 7 wickets
ODI 3402	1 August	Brendan Taylor	Virat Kohli	Queens Sports Club, Bulawayo	India by 9 wickets
ODI 3403	3 August	Brendan Taylor	Virat Kohli	Queens Sports Club, Bulawayo	India by 7 wickets

== August ==
=== United Arab Emirates in Canada ===
2011–13 ICC Intercontinental Cup
No.	Date	Home captain	Away captain	Venue	Result
First-class	1–4 August	Jimmy Hansra	Khurram Khan	Maple Leaf North-West Ground, King City	Match drawn
2011–13 ICC World Cricket League Championship
No.	Date	Home captain	Away captain	Venue	Result
List A	6 August	Rizwan Cheema	Khurram Khan	Maple Leaf North-West Ground, King City	United Arab Emirates by 46 runs
List A	8 August	Rizwan Cheema	Khurram Khan	Maple Leaf North-West Ground, King City	United Arab Emirates by 2 wickets
T20 series
No.	Date	Home captain	Away captain	Venue	Result
Twenty20	10 August	Rizwan Cheema	Ahmed Raza	Toronto Cricket, Skating and Curling Club, Toronto	United Arab Emirates by 72 runs
Twenty20	11 August	Rizwan Cheema	Ahmed Raza	Toronto Cricket, Skating and Curling Club, Toronto	United Arab Emirates by 7 wickets

=== Afghanistan in Namibia ===
2011–13 ICC Intercontinental Cup
No.	Date	Home captain	Away captain	Venue	Result
First-class	4–6 August	Sarel Burger	Mohammad Nabi	Wanderers Cricket Ground, Windhoek	Afghanistan by 10 wickets
2011–13 ICC World Cricket League Championship
No.	Date	Home captain	Away captain	Venue	Result
List A	9 August	Sarel Burger	Mohammad Nabi	Wanderers Cricket Ground, Windhoek	Afghanistan by 190 runs
List A	11 August	Sarel Burger	Mohammad Nabi	Wanderers Cricket Ground, Windhoek	Afghanistan by 5 wickets

=== Australia women in England ===
WTest Series
No.	Date	Home captain	Away captain	Venue	Result
WTEST 134	11–14 August	Charlotte Edwards	Jodie Fields	Sir Paul Getty's Ground, Wormsley	Match drawn
WODI Series
No.	Date	Home captain	Away captain	Venue	Result
WODI 881	20 August	Charlotte Edwards	Jodie Fields	Lord's, London	Australia by 27 runs
WODI 882	23 August	Charlotte Edwards	Jodie Fields	County Cricket Ground, Hove	England by 51 runs
WODI 883	25 August	Charlotte Edwards	Jodie Fields	County Cricket Ground, Hove	England by 5 wickets
WT20I Series
No.	Date	Home captain	Away captain	Venue	Result
WT20I 208	27 August	Charlotte Edwards	Jodie Fields	County Cricket Ground, Chelmsford	England by 15 runs
WT20I 209	29 August	Charlotte Edwards	Jodie Fields	Rose Bowl, Southampton	England by 5 wickets
WT20I 210	31 August	Charlotte Edwards	Jodie Fields	Riverside Ground, Chester-le-Street	England by 7 wickets

=== The Netherlands in Canada ===
2011–13 ICC Intercontinental Cup
No.	Date	Home captain	Away captain	Venue	Result
First-class	22–25 August	Jimmy Hansra	Peter Borren	Maple Leaf South-West Ground, King City	Canada by 8 wickets
2011–13 ICC World Cricket League Championship
No.	Date	Home captain	Away captain	Venue	Result
ODI 3405	27 August	Ashish Bagai	Peter Borren	Maple Leaf North-West Ground, King City	No result
ODI 3407	29 August	Ashish Bagai	Peter Borren	Maple Leaf North-West Ground, King City	Netherlands by 9 wickets

=== Pakistan in Zimbabwe ===
T20I series
No.	Date	Home captain	Away captain	Venue	Result
T20I 326	23 August	Brendan Taylor	Mohammad Hafeez	Harare Sports Club, Harare	Pakistan by 25 runs
T20I 327	24 August	Brendan Taylor	Mohammad Hafeez	Harare Sports Club, Harare	Pakistan by 19 runs
ODI series
No.	Date	Home captain	Away captain	Venue	Result
ODI 3404	27 August	Brendan Taylor	Misbah-ul-Haq	Harare Sports Club, Harare	Zimbabwe by 7 wickets
ODI 3406	29 August	Brendan Taylor	Misbah-ul-Haq	Harare Sports Club, Harare	Pakistan by 90 runs
ODI 3408	31 August	Brendan Taylor	Misbah-ul-Haq	Harare Sports Club, Harare	Pakistan by 108 runs
Test series
No.	Date	Home captain	Away captain	Venue	Result
Test 2095	3–7 September	Hamilton Masakadza	Misbah-ul-Haq	Harare Sports Club, Harare	Pakistan by 221 runs
Test 2096	10–14 September	Brendan Taylor	Misbah-ul-Haq	Harare Sports Club, Harare	Zimbabwe by 24 runs

== September ==
=== England in Ireland ===
Only ODI
No.	Date	Home captain	Away captain	Venue	Result
ODI 3409	3 September	William Porterfield	Eoin Morgan	The Village, Malahide	England by 6 wickets

=== Australia in Scotland ===
Only ODI
No.	Date	Home captain	Away captain	Venue	Result
ODI 3410	3 September	Preston Mommsen	Michael Clarke	Grange Cricket Club Ground, Edinburgh	Australia by 200 runs

=== Scotland in Ireland ===
2011–13 ICC World Cricket League Championship
No.	Date	Home captain	Away captain	Venue	Result
ODI 3411	6 September	William Porterfield	Preston Mommsen	Civil Service Cricket Club, Belfast	Ireland by 1 wicket
ODI 3413	8 September	William Porterfield	Preston Mommsen	Civil Service Cricket Club, Belfast	Ireland by 7 wickets
2011–13 ICC Intercontinental Cup
No.	Date	Home captain	Away captain	Venue	Result
First-class	11–14 September	William Porterfield	Preston Mommsen	Clontarf Cricket Club Ground, Dublin	Ireland by an innings and 44 runs

=== Bangladesh women in South Africa ===
WT20I Series
No.	Date	Home captain	Away captain	Venue	Result
WT20I 211	12 September	Mignon du Preez	Salma Khatun	Senwes Park, Potchefstroom	South Africa by 9 wickets
WT20I 212	14 September	Mignon du Preez	Salma Khatun	Senwes Park, Potchefstroom	South Africa by 9 wickets
WT20I 213	15 September	Mignon du Preez	Salma Khatun	Senwes Park, Potchefstroom	South Africa by 3 runs
WODI Series
No.	Date	Home captain	Away captain	Venue	Result
WODI 884	20 September	Mignon du Preez	Salma Khatun	Willowmoore Park, Benoni	South Africa by 6 wickets
WODI 885	22 September	Mignon du Preez	Salma Khatun	Wanderers Stadium, Johannesburg	South Africa by 95 runs
WODI 886	24 September	Mignon du Preez	Salma Khatun	Centurion Park, Centurion	South Africa by 8 wickets
