= International cricket in 2009–10 =

Cricket season

The 2009–10 international cricket season was between September 2009 and March 2010. Australia had a very successful season that included winning the ICC Champions Trophy and a home season in which they were undefeated against the touring West Indies and Pakistan.

== Season overview ==
International tours
Start date	Home team	Away team	Results [Matches]		
Start date	Home team	Away team	Test	ODI	T20I
12 October 2009	Zimbabwe	Kenya	—	4–1 [5]	—
25 October 2009	India	Australia	—	2–4 [7]	—
27 October 2009	Bangladesh	Zimbabwe	—	4–1 [5]	—
3 November 2009	Pakistan	New Zealand	1–1 [3]	1–2 [3]	2–0 [2]
8 November 2009	South Africa	Zimbabwe	—	2–0 [2]	—
13 November 2009	South Africa	England	1–1 [4]	1–2 [5]	1–1 [2]
16 November 2009	India	Sri Lanka	2–0 [3]	3–1 [5]	1–1 [2]
26 November 2009	Australia	West Indies	2–0 [3]	4–0 [5]	2–0 [2]
26 December 2009	Australia	Pakistan	3–0 [3]	5–0 [5]	1–0 [1]
17 January 2010	Bangladesh	India	0–2 [2]	—	—
3 February 2010	New Zealand	Bangladesh	1–0 [1]	3–0 [3]	1–0 [1]
6 February 2010	India	South Africa	1–1 [2]	2–1 [3]	—
19 February 2010	Pakistan	England	—	—	1–1 [2]
26 February 2010	New Zealand	Australia	0–2 [2]	2–3 [5]	1–1 [2]
28 February 2010	West Indies	Zimbabwe	—	4–1 [5]	0–1 [1]
28 February 2010	Bangladesh	England	0–2 [2]	0–3 [3]	—
International tournaments
Start date	Tournament			Winners	
8 September 2009	(Sri Lanka) Tri-Series			India	
22 September 2009	(South Africa) ICC Champions Trophy			Australia	
4 January 2010	(Bangladesh) Tri-Series			Sri Lanka	
Minor tours
Start date	Home team	Away team	Results [Matches]		
Start date	Home team	Away team	First-class		ODI
16 February 2010	Kenya	Netherlands	1–0 [1]		1–1 [2]
16 February 2010	Afghanistan	Canada	1–0 [1]		1–1 [2]
Minor tournaments
Start date	Tournament			Winners	
30 January 2010	(Kenya) Associates Twenty20 Series			Kenya	
1 February 2010	(Sri Lanka) Quadrangular Twenty20 Series			Sri Lanka	
9 February 2010	(United Arab Emirates) ICC World Twenty20 Qualifier			Afghanistan	
20 February 2010	(Nepal) ICC World Cricket League Division Five			Nepal	

== Pre-season rankings ==
ICC Test Championship 1 August 2009
Rank	Team	Matches	Points	Rating
1	Australia	25	3106	124
2	South Africa	30	3672	122
3	Sri Lanka	29	3456	119
4	India	28	3327	119
5	England	33	3258	99
6	Pakistan	17	1424	84
7	New Zealand	22	1794	82
8	West Indies	25	1910	76
9	Bangladesh	19	255	13
Reference: ICC Official Rankings List, 30 August 2009

ICC ODI Championship 1 August 2009
Rank	Team	Matches	Points	Rating
1	South Africa	18	2280	127
2	India	26	3286	126
3	Australia	22	2626	119
4	England	18	1990	111
5	New Zealand	15	1651	110
6	Pakistan	21	2297	109
7	Sri Lanka	25	2600	104
8	West Indies	18	1397	78
9	Bangladesh	23	1257	55
10	Ireland	5	135	27
11	Zimbabwe	20	513	26
12	Kenya	9	0	0
Reference: ICC Official Rankings List, 27 August 2009

== September ==
=== Tri-Series in Sri Lanka ===
Pos	Team	Pld	W	L	T	NR	Pts	NRR	For	Against
1	Sri Lanka	2	2	0	0	0	10	2.360	523/100	287/100
2	India	2	1	1	0	0	5	−1.040	324/90.3	462/100
3	New Zealand	2	0	2	0	0	0	−1.370	274/100	372/90.3

Source: ESPNcricinfo

No.	Date	Team 1	Captain 1	Team 2	Captain 2	Venue	Result
Group stage
ODI 2884	8 September	New Zealand	Daniel Vettori	Sri Lanka	Kumar Sangakkara	R Premadasa Stadium, Colombo	Sri Lanka by 97 runs
ODI 2886	11 September	India	Mahendra Singh Dhoni	New Zealand	Daniel Vettori	R Premadasa Stadium, Colombo	India by 6 wickets
ODI 2887	12 September	India	Mahendra Singh Dhoni	Sri Lanka	Kumar Sangakkara	R Premadasa Stadium, Colombo	Sri Lanka by 139 runs
Final
ODI 2889	14 September	India	Mahendra Singh Dhoni	Sri Lanka	Kumar Sangakkara	R Premadasa Stadium, Colombo	India by 46 runs

=== 2009 ICC Champions Trophy ===
The 2009 ICC Champions Trophy was scheduled to take place in the 2008–09 season in Pakistan, but because of an unstable security situation, it was rescheduled for the 2009–10 season. The hosting rights were also moved from Pakistan to South Africa. Sri Lanka was considered as a potential host, but was discarded due to worries related to the weather during that time of the year in Sri Lanka.

==== Group stage ====
Group A
Pos	Team	Pld	W	L	T	NR	Pts	NRR
1	Australia	3	2	0	0	1	5	0.510
2	Pakistan	3	2	1	0	0	4	0.999
3	India	3	1	1	0	1	3	0.290
4	West Indies	3	0	3	0	0	0	−1.537

Source: ESPNcricinfo

Group B
Pos	Team	Pld	W	L	T	NR	Pts	NRR
1	New Zealand	3	2	1	0	0	4	0.782
2	England	3	2	1	0	0	4	−0.487
3	Sri Lanka	3	1	2	0	0	2	−0.085
4	South Africa	3	1	2	0	0	2	−0.177

Source: ESPNcricinfo

No.	Date	Team 1	Captain 1	Team 2	Captain 2	Venue	Result
Group stage
ODI 2893	22 September	South Africa	Graeme Smith	Sri Lanka	Kumar Sangakkara	SuperSport Park, Centurion	Sri Lanka by 55 runs (D/L)
ODI 2894	23 September	Pakistan	Shahid Afridi	West Indies	Floyd Reifer	New Wanderers Stadium, Johannesburg	Pakistan by 5 wickets
ODI 2895	24 September	New Zealand	Daniel Vettori	South Africa	Graeme Smith	SuperSport Park, Centurion	South Africa by 5 wickets
ODI 2896	25 September	Sri Lanka	Kumar Sangakkara	England	Andrew Strauss	New Wanderers Stadium, Johannesburg	England by 6 wickets
ODI 2897	26 September	Australia	Ricky Ponting	West Indies	Floyd Reifer	New Wanderers Stadium, Johannesburg	Australia by 50 runs
ODI 2898	26 September	Pakistan	Younis Khan	India	Mahendra Singh Dhoni	SuperSport Park, Centurion	Pakistan by 54 runs
ODI 2899	27 September	New Zealand	Daniel Vettori	Sri Lanka	Kumar Sangakkara	New Wanderers Stadium, Johannesburg	New Zealand by 38 runs
ODI 2900	27 September	South Africa	Graeme Smith	England	Andrew Strauss	SuperSport Park, Centurion	England by 22 runs
ODI 2901	28 September	Australia	Ricky Ponting	India	Mahendra Singh Dhoni	SuperSport Park, Centurion	No result
ODI 2902	29 September	New Zealand	Daniel Vettori	England	Andrew Strauss	New Wanderers Stadium, Johannesburg	New Zealand by 6 wickets
ODI 2903	30 September	Australia	Ricky Ponting	Pakistan	Younis Khan	SuperSport Park, Centurion	Australia by 2 wickets
ODI 2904	30 September	India	Mahendra Singh Dhoni	West Indies	Floyd Reifer	New Wanderers Stadium, Johannesburg	India by 7 wickets

==== Knockouts ====
No.	Date	Team 1	Captain 1	Team 2	Captain 2	Venue	Result
Semi-finals
ODI 2905	2 October	Australia	Ricky Ponting	England	Andrew Strauss	SuperSport Park, Centurion	Australia by 9 wickets
ODI 2906	3 October	New Zealand	Daniel Vettori	Pakistan	Younis Khan	New Wanderers Stadium, Johannesburg	New Zealand by 5 wickets
Final
ODI 2907	5 October	Australia	Ricky Ponting	New Zealand	Brendon McCullum	SuperSport Park, Centurion	Australia by 6 wickets

== October ==
=== Kenya in Zimbabwe ===
No.	Date	Home captain	Away captain	Venue	Result
2009–10 ICC Intercontinental Cup
First-class	7–10 October	Vusi Sibanda	Morris Ouma	Kwekwe Sports Club, Kwekwe	Zimbabwe XI by 5 wickets
ODI series
ODI 2908	12 October	Prosper Utseya	Morris Ouma	Harare Sports Club, Harare	Zimbabwe by 91 runs
ODI 2909	13 October	Prosper Utseya	Morris Ouma	Harare Sports Club, Harare	Zimbabwe by 86 runs
ODI 2910	15 October	Prosper Utseya	Morris Ouma	Harare Sports Club, Harare	Kenya by 20 runs
ODI 2911	17 October	Prosper Utseya	Morris Ouma	Harare Sports Club, Harare	Zimbabwe by 6 wickets
ODI 2912	18 October	Prosper Utseya	Morris Ouma	Harare Sports Club, Harare	Zimbabwe by 142 runs

=== Australia in India ===
Australia played seven ODIs in India from 25 October to 11 November 2009. The seven ODIs complemented the Test series that took place between the two nations in 2008 in India.

No.	Date	Home captain	Away captain	Venue	Result
ODI series
ODI 2913	25 October	Mahendra Singh Dhoni	Ricky Ponting	Reliance Stadium, Vadodara	Australia by 4 runs
ODI 2915	28 October	Mahendra Singh Dhoni	Ricky Ponting	VCA Stadium, Nagpur	India by 99 runs
ODI 2918	31 October	Mahendra Singh Dhoni	Ricky Ponting	Feroz Shah Kotla, Delhi	India by 6 wickets
ODI 2919	2 November	Mahendra Singh Dhoni	Ricky Ponting	PCA Stadium, Mohali	Australia by 24 runs
ODI 2923	5 November	Mahendra Singh Dhoni	Ricky Ponting	Rajiv Gandhi Stadium, Hyderabad	Australia by 3 runs
ODI 2925	8 November	Mahendra Singh Dhoni	Ricky Ponting	Nehru Stadium, Guwahati	Australia by 6 wickets
ODI 2928a	11 November	Mahendra Singh Dhoni	Ricky Ponting	Brabourne Stadium, Mumbai	Match abandoned without a ball bowled

=== Zimbabwe in Bangladesh ===
No.	Date	Home captain	Away captain	Venue	Result
ODI series
ODI 2914	27 October	Shakib Al Hasan	Prosper Utseya	Shere Bangla National Stadium, Mirpur	Zimbabwe by 5 wickets
ODI 2916	29 October	Shakib Al Hasan	Hamilton Masakadza	Shere Bangla National Stadium, Mirpur	Bangladesh by 7 wickets
ODI 2917	31 October	Shakib Al Hasan	Hamilton Masakadza	Shere Bangla National Stadium, Mirpur	Bangladesh by 4 wickets
ODI 2920	3 November	Shakib Al Hasan	Hamilton Masakadza	Jahur Ahmed Chowdhury Stadium, Chittagong	Bangladesh by 6 wickets
ODI 2922	5 November	Shakib Al Hasan	Hamilton Masakadza	Jahur Ahmed Chowdhury Stadium, Chittagong	Bangladesh by 1 wicket

== November ==
=== Pakistan v New Zealand in UAE ===
No.	Date	Home captain	Away captain	Venue	Result
ODI series
ODI 2921	3 November	Younis Khan	Daniel Vettori	Sheikh Zayed Cricket Stadium, Abu Dhabi	Pakistan by 138 runs
ODI 2924	6 November	Younis Khan	Daniel Vettori	Sheikh Zayed Cricket Stadium, Abu Dhabi	New Zealand by 64 runs
ODI 2927	9 November	Younis Khan	Daniel Vettori	Sheikh Zayed Cricket Stadium, Abu Dhabi	New Zealand by 7 runs
T20I series
T20I 122	12 November	Shahid Afridi	Brendon McCullum	Dubai Sports City Cricket Stadium, Dubai	Pakistan by 49 runs
T20I 123	13 November	Shahid Afridi	Brendon McCullum	Dubai Sports City Cricket Stadium, Dubai	Pakistan by 7 runs

=== Zimbabwe in South Africa ===
No.	Date	Home captain	Away captain	Venue	Result
ODI series
ODI 2926	8 November	Graeme Smith	Prosper Utseya	Willowmoore Park, Benoni	South Africa by 45 runs
ODI 2928	10 November	Graeme Smith	Prosper Utseya	SuperSport Park, Centurion	South Africa by 212 runs

=== England in South Africa ===
No.	Date	Home captain	Away captain	Venue	Result
T20I series
T20I 124	13 November	Graeme Smith	Paul Collingwood	Wanderers, Johannesburg	England by 1 run (D/L)
T20I 125	15 November	Graeme Smith	Alastair Cook	Centurion, Gauteng	South Africa by 84 runs
ODI series
ODI 2928b	20 November	Graeme Smith	Andrew Strauss	Wanderers, Johannesburg	Match abandoned without a ball bowled
ODI 2929	22 November	Graeme Smith	Andrew Strauss	Centurion, Gauteng	England by 7 wickets
ODI 2930	27 November	Graeme Smith	Andrew Strauss	Newlands, Cape Town	South Africa by 112 runs
ODI 2931	29 November	Graeme Smith	Andrew Strauss	St George's, Port Elizabeth	England by 7 wickets
ODI 2931a	4 December	Graeme Smith	Andrew Strauss	Kingsmead, Durban	Match abandoned without a ball bowled
Test series
Test 1942	16–20 December	Graeme Smith	Andrew Strauss	Centurion, Gauteng	Match drawn
Test 1944	26–30 December	Graeme Smith	Andrew Strauss	Kingsmead, Durban	England by an innings and 98 runs
Test 1946	3–7 January	Graeme Smith	Andrew Strauss	Newlands, Cape Town	Match drawn
Test 1948	14–18 January	Graeme Smith	Andrew Strauss	Wanderers, Johannesburg	South Africa by an innings and 74 runs

=== Sri Lanka in India ===
No.	Date	Home captain	Away captain	Venue	Result
Test series
Test 1933	16–20 November	Mahendra Singh Dhoni	Kumar Sangakkara	Sardar Patel Stadium, Ahmedabad	Match drawn
Test 1935	24–28 November	Mahendra Singh Dhoni	Kumar Sangakkara	Green Park, Kanpur	India by an inning and 144 runs
Test 1937	2–6 December	Mahendra Singh Dhoni	Kumar Sangakkara	Brabourne Stadium, Mumbai	India by an inning and 24 runs
T20I series
T20I 126	9 December	Mahendra Singh Dhoni	Kumar Sangakkara	Vidarbha Cricket Association Stadium, Nagpur	Sri Lanka by 29 runs
T20I 127	12 December	Mahendra Singh Dhoni	Kumar Sangakkara	Punjab Cricket Association Stadium, Mohali	India by 6 wickets
ODI series
ODI 2932	15 December	Mahendra Singh Dhoni	Kumar Sangakkara	Madhavrao Scindia Cricket Ground, Rajkot	India by 3 runs
ODI 2933	18 December	Mahendra Singh Dhoni	Kumar Sangakkara	Vidarbha Cricket Association Stadium, Nagpur	Sri Lanka by 3 wickets
ODI 2934	21 December	Virender Sehwag	Kumar Sangakkara	Barabati Stadium, Cuttack	India by 7 wickets
ODI 2935	24 December	Virender Sehwag	Kumar Sangakkara	Eden Gardens, Kolkata	India by 7 wickets
ODI 2936	27 December	Mahendra Singh Dhoni	Kumar Sangakkara	Feroz Shah Kotla, Delhi	Match abandoned

=== Pakistan in New Zealand ===
Although being played in New Zealand, this is a "home" series for Pakistan.

No.	Date	Home captain	Away captain	Venue	Result
Test series
Test 1934	24–28 November	Mohammad Yousuf	Daniel Vettori	University Oval, Dunedin	New Zealand by 32 runs
Test 1938	3–7 December	Mohammad Yousuf	Daniel Vettori	Basin Reserve, Wellington	Pakistan by 141 runs
Test 1940	11–15 December	Mohammad Yousuf	Daniel Vettori	McLean Park, Napier	Match drawn

=== West Indies in Australia ===
No.	Date	Home captain	Away captain	Venue	Result
Test series
Test 1936	26–30 November	Ricky Ponting	Chris Gayle	Brisbane Cricket Ground, Brisbane	Australia by an innings and 65 runs
Test 1939	4–8 December	Ricky Ponting	Chris Gayle	Adelaide Oval, Adelaide	Match drawn
Test 1941	16–20 December	Ricky Ponting	Chris Gayle	Western Australia Cricket Association Ground, Perth	Australia by 35 runs
ODI series
ODI 2950	7 February	Ricky Ponting	Chris Gayle	Melbourne Cricket Ground, Melbourne	Australia by 113 runs
ODI 2952	9 February	Ricky Ponting	Chris Gayle	Adelaide Oval, Adelaide	Australia by 8 wickets
ODI 2954	12 February	Ricky Ponting	Chris Gayle	Sydney Cricket Ground, Sydney	No result
ODI 2955	14 February	Ricky Ponting	Chris Gayle	Brisbane Cricket Ground, Brisbane	Australia by 50 runs
ODI 2960	19 February	Ricky Ponting	Chris Gayle	Melbourne Cricket Ground, Melbourne	Australia by 125 runs
T20I series
T20I 146	21 February	Michael Clarke	Chris Gayle	Bellerive Oval, Hobart	Australia by 38 runs
T20I 147	23 February	Michael Clarke	Chris Gayle	Sydney Cricket Ground, Sydney	Australia by 8 wickets

== December ==
=== Pakistan in Australia ===
No.	Date	Home captain	Away captain	Venue	Result
Test series
Test 1943	26–30 December	Ricky Ponting	Mohammed Yousuf	Melbourne Cricket Ground, Melbourne	Australia by 170 runs
Test 1945	3–7 January	Ricky Ponting	Mohammad Yousuf	Sydney Cricket Ground, Sydney	Australia by 36 runs
Test 1947	14–18 January	Ricky Ponting	Mohammad Yousuf	Bellerive Oval, Hobart	Australia by 231 runs
ODI series
ODI 2944	22 January	Ricky Ponting	Mohammad Yousuf	Brisbane Cricket Ground, Brisbane	Australia by 5 wickets
ODI 2945	24 January	Ricky Ponting	Mohammad Yousuf	Sydney Cricket Ground, Sydney	Australia by 140 runs
ODI 2946	26 January	Ricky Ponting	Mohammad Yousuf	Adelaide Oval, Adelaide	Australia by 40 runs
ODI 2947	29 January	Ricky Ponting	Mohammad Yousuf	Western Australia Cricket Association Ground, Perth	Australia by 135 runs
ODI 2948	31 January	Ricky Ponting	Shahid Afridi	Western Australia Cricket Association Ground, Perth	Australia by 2 wickets
T20I series
T20I 134	5 February	Michael Clarke	Shoaib Malik	Melbourne Cricket Ground, Melbourne	Australia by 2 runs

== January ==
=== Tri-series in Bangladesh ===
Pos	Team	Pld	W	L	NR	T	Pts	NRR
1	India	4	3	1	0	0	13	+0.753
2	Sri Lanka	4	3	1	0	0	12	–0.051
3	Bangladesh	4	0	4	0	0	0	–0.684

No.	Date	Team 1	Captain 1	Team 2	Captain 2	Venue	Result
Group stage
ODI 2937	4 January	Bangladesh	Shakib Al Hasan	Sri Lanka	Kumar Sangakkara	Shere Bangla National Stadium, Mirpur	Sri Lanka by 7 wickets
ODI 2938	5 January	India	Mahendra Singh Dhoni	Sri Lanka	Kumar Sangakkara	Shere Bangla National Stadium, Mirpur	Sri Lanka by 5 wickets
ODI 2939	7 January	Bangladesh	Shakib Al Hasan	India	Mahendra Singh Dhoni	Shere Bangla National Stadium, Mirpur	India by 6 wickets
ODI 2940	8 January	Bangladesh	Shakib Al Hasan	Sri Lanka	Kumar Sangakkara	Shere Bangla National Stadium, Mirpur	Sri Lanka by 9 wickets
ODI 2941	10 January	India	Mahendra Singh Dhoni	Sri Lanka	Kumar Sangakkara	Shere Bangla National Stadium, Mirpur	India by 8 wickets
ODI 2942	11 January	Bangladesh	Shakib Al Hasan	India	Mahendra Singh Dhoni	Shere Bangla National Stadium, Mirpur	India by 6 wickets
Final
ODI 2943	13 January	India	Mahendra Singh Dhoni	Sri Lanka	Kumar Sangakkara	Shere Bangla National Stadium, Mirpur	Sri Lanka by 4 wickets

=== India in Bangladesh ===
No.	Date	Home captain	Away captain	Venue	Result
Test series
Test 1949	17–21 January	Shakib Al Hasan	Virender Sehwag	Chittagong Divisional Stadium, Chittagong	India by 113 runs
Test 1950	24–28 January	Shakib Al Hasan	Mahendra Singh Dhoni	Sher-e-Bangla Cricket Stadium, Mirpur	India by 10 wickets

=== 2010 Associates Twenty20 Series in Kenya ===
Pos	Team	Pld	W	L	T	NR	Pts	NRR
1	Kenya	4	4	0	0	0	8	1.946
2	Scotland	4	2	2	0	0	4	−0.446
3	Uganda	4	0	4	0	0	0	−1.177

No.	Date	Team 1	Captain 1	Team 2	Captain 2	Venue	Result
Twenty20 series
Match 1	30 January	Kenya	Morris Ouma	Uganda	Akbar Baig	Gymkhana Club Ground, Nairobi, Kenya	Kenya by 8 wickets
Match 2	31 January	Scotland	Gavin Hamilton	Uganda	Akbar Baig	Gymkhana Club Ground, Nairobi, Kenya	Match tied; Scotland won the Super Over
T20I 129	1 February	Kenya	Morris Ouma	Scotland	Gavin Hamilton	Gymkhana Club Ground, Nairobi, Kenya	Kenya by 10 wickets
Match 4	2 February	Kenya	Morris Ouma	Uganda	Davis Arinaitwe	Gymkhana Club Ground, Nairobi, Kenya	Kenya by 14 runs
Match 5	3 February	Scotland	Gavin Hamilton	Uganda	Davis Arinaitwe	Gymkhana Club Ground, Nairobi, Kenya	Scotland by 56 runs
T20I 133	4 February	Kenya	Morris Ouma	Scotland	Gavin Hamilton	Gymkhana Club Ground, Nairobi, Kenya	Kenya by 10 wickets

== February ==
=== 2010 Quadrangular Twenty20 Series in Sri Lanka ===
Pos	Team	Pld	W	L	NR	T	Pts	NRR
1	Sri Lanka A	3	3	0	0	0	6	+2.491
2	Canada	3	1	2	0	0	2	+0.366
3	Ireland	3	1	2	0	0	2	–0.063
4	Afghanistan	3	1	2	0	0	2	–1.363

No.	Date	Team 1	Captain 1	Team 2	Captain 2	Venue	Result
Twenty20 series
Match 1	1 February	Sri Lanka A	Kaushal Silva	Canada	Ashish Bagai	P Sara Oval, Sri Lanka	Sri Lanka A by 9 wickets
T20I 128	1 February	Afghanistan	Nowroz Mangal	Ireland	William Porterfield	P Sara Oval, Sri Lanka	Ireland by 5 wickets
T20I 130	3 February	Canada	Ashish Bagai	Ireland	William Porterfield	Sinhalese Sports Club Ground, Colombo, Sri Lanka	Canada by 4 runs
Match 4	3 February	Sri Lanka A	Kaushal Silva	Afghanistan	Nowroz Mangal	Sinhalese Sports Club Ground, Colombo, Sri Lanka	Sri Lanka A by 69 runs
T20I 132	4 February	Afghanistan	Nowroz Mangal	Canada	Ashish Bagai	Sinhalese Sports Club Ground, Colombo, Sri Lanka	Afghanistan by 5 wickets
Match 6	4 February	Sri Lanka A	Chamara Kapugedera	Ireland	Niall O'Brien	Sinhalese Sports Club Ground, Colombo, Sri Lanka	Sri Lanka A by 5 wickets

=== Bangladesh in New Zealand ===
No.	Date	Home captain	Away captain	Venue	Result
T20I series
T20I 131	3 February	Daniel Vettori	Shakib Al Hasan	Seddon Park, Hamilton	New Zealand by 10 wickets
ODI series
ODI 2949	5 February	Daniel Vettori	Shakib Al Hasan	McLean Park, Napier	New Zealand by 146 runs
ODI 2951	8 February	Daniel Vettori	Shakib Al Hasan	University Oval, Dunedin	New Zealand by 5 wickets
ODI 2953	11 February	Daniel Vettori	Shakib Al Hasan	AMI Stadium, Christchurch	New Zealand by 3 wickets
Test series
Test 1953	15–19 February	Daniel Vettori	Shakib Al Hasan	Seddon Park, Hamilton	New Zealand by 121 runs

=== South Africa in India ===
No.	Date	Home captain	Away captain	Venue	Result
Test series
Test 1951	6–10 February	Mahendra Singh Dhoni	Graeme Smith	VCA Stadium, Nagpur	South Africa by an innings and 6 runs
Test 1952	14–18 February	Mahendra Singh Dhoni	Graeme Smith	Eden Gardens, Kolkata	India by an innings and 57 runs
ODI series
ODI 2961	21 February	Mahendra Singh Dhoni	Jacques Kallis	Sawai Mansingh Stadium, Jaipur	India by 1 run
ODI 2962	24 February	Mahendra Singh Dhoni	Jacques Kallis	Captain Roop Singh Stadium, Gwalior	India by 153 runs
ODI 2963	27 February	Mahendra Singh Dhoni	Jacques Kallis	Sardar Patel Stadium, Ahmedabad	South Africa by 90 runs

=== 2010 ICC World Twenty20 Qualifier ===
The top two teams progressed to the 2010 ICC World Twenty20 in the Caribbean.

==== Group stage ====
Group A
Pos	Team	Pld	W	L	T	NR	Pts	NRR
1	Afghanistan	3	3	0	0	0	6	0.933
2	Ireland	3	2	1	0	0	4	1.700
3	United States	3	1	2	0	0	2	−1.684
4	Scotland	3	0	3	0	0	0	−0.958

Group B
Pos	Team	Pld	W	L	T	NR	Pts	NRR
1	United Arab Emirates	3	3	0	0	0	6	1.174
2	Netherlands	3	2	1	0	0	4	0.116
3	Kenya	3	1	2	0	0	2	0.309
4	Canada	3	0	3	0	0	0	−1.611

No.	Date	Group	Team 1	Captain 1	Team 2	Captain 2	Venue	Result
Group stage
Match 1	9 February	A	Scotland	Gavin Hamilton	United States	Steve Massiah	Sheikh Zayed Stadium, Abu Dhabi, UAE	United States by 6 wickets
T20I 135	9 February	A	Afghanistan	Nowroz Mangal	Ireland	William Porterfield	Dubai Sports City Cricket Stadium, Dubai, UAE	Afghanistan by 13 runs
Match 3	9 February	B	Kenya	Morris Ouma	United Arab Emirates	Khurram Khan	Sheikh Zayed Stadium, Abu Dhabi, UAE	United Arab Emirates by 15 runs
T20I 136	9 February	B	Canada	Rizwan Cheema	Netherlands	Peter Borren	Dubai Sports City Cricket Stadium, Dubai, UAE	Netherlands by 6 wickets
T20I 137	10 February	A	Afghanistan	Nowroz Mangal	Scotland	Gavin Hamilton	Sheikh Zayed Stadium, Abu Dhabi, UAE	Afghanistan by 14 runs
Match 6	10 February	A	United States	Steve Massiah	Ireland	William Porterfield	Sheikh Zayed Stadium, Abu Dhabi, UAE	Ireland by 78 runs
T20I 138	10 February	B	Canada	Rizwan Cheema	Kenya	Morris Ouma	Dubai Sports City Cricket Stadium, Dubai, UAE	Kenya by 9 wickets
Match 8	10 February	B	Netherlands	Peter Borren	United Arab Emirates	Khurram Khan	Dubai Sports City Cricket Stadium, Dubai, UAE	United Arab Emirates by 6 wickets
Match 9	11 February	A	Afghanistan	Nowroz Mangal	United States	Steve Massiah	Dubai Sports City Cricket Stadium, Dubai, UAE	Afghanistan by 29 runs
T20I 139	11 February	B	Kenya	Morris Ouma	Netherlands	Peter Borren	Sheikh Zayed Stadium, Abu Dhabi, UAE	Netherlands by 7 wickets
T20I 140	11 February	A	Scotland	Gavin Hamilton	Ireland	William Porterfield	Dubai Sports City Cricket Stadium, Dubai, UAE	Ireland by 37 runs
Match 11	11 February	B	Canada	Ashish Bagai	United Arab Emirates	Khurram Khan	Sheikh Zayed Stadium, Abu Dhabi, UAE	United Arab Emirates by 42 runs

==== Super Four ====
Pos	Team	Pld	W	L	T	NR	Pts	NRR
1	Ireland	3	2	1	0	0	4	1.233
2	Afghanistan	3	2	1	0	0	4	0.100
3	United Arab Emirates	3	1	2	0	0	2	−0.244
4	Netherlands	3	1	2	0	0	2	−1.105

No.	Date	Team 1	Captain 1	Team 2	Captain 2	Venue	Result
Super Four
T20I 141	12 February	Afghanistan	Nowroz Mangal	Netherlands	Peter Borren	Dubai Sports City Cricket Stadium, Dubai, UAE	Netherlands by 4 wickets
Match 14	12 February	United Arab Emirates	Khurram Khan	Ireland	William Porterfield	Dubai Sports City Cricket Stadium, Dubai, UAE	Ireland by 22 runs
Match 15	13 February	United Arab Emirates	Khurram Khan	Afghanistan	Nowroz Mangal	Dubai Sports City Cricket Stadium, Dubai, UAE	Afghanistan by 4 wickets
T20I 142	13 February	Netherlands	Peter Borren	Ireland	William Porterfield	Dubai Sports City Cricket Stadium, Dubai, UAE	Ireland by 65 runs

==== Final ====
No.	Date	Team 1	Captain 1	Team 2	Captain 2	Venue	Result
Final
T20I 143	13 February	Ireland	William Porterfield	Afghanistan	Nowroz Mangal	Dubai Sports City Cricket Stadium, Dubai, UAE	Afghanistan by 8 wickets

=== Kenya vs Netherlands ===
No.	Date	Home captain	Away captain	Venue	Result
ODI series
ODI 2956	16 February	Morris Ouma	Peter Borren	Gymkhana Club Ground, Nairobi	Kenya by 6 wickets
ODI 2958	18 February	Morris Ouma	Peter Borren	Gymkhana Club Ground, Nairobi	Netherlands by 80 runs

=== Afghanistan vs Canada in UAE ===
No.	Date	Home captain	Away captain	Venue	Result
ODI series
ODI 2957	16 February	Nowroz Mangal	Ashish Bagai	Sharjah Cricket Association Stadium, Sharjah, UAE	Afghanistan by 1 run
ODI 2959	18 February	Nowroz Mangal	Ashish Bagai	Sharjah Cricket Association Stadium, Sharjah, UAE	Canada by 4 wickets

=== England vs Pakistan ===
No.	Date	Home captain	Away captain	Venue	Result
T20I series
T20I 144	19 February	Shoaib Malik	Paul Collingwood	Dubai Sports City Cricket Stadium, Dubai	England by 7 wickets
T20I 145	20 February	Shoaib Malik	Paul Collingwood	Dubai Sports City Cricket Stadium, Dubai	Pakistan by 4 wickets

=== 2010 ICC World Cricket League Division Five ===
==== Group stage ====
Pos	Team	Pld	W	L	T	NR	Pts	NRR
1	United States	5	4	1	0	0	8	1.371
2	Nepal	5	4	1	0	0	8	1.351
3	Singapore	5	4	1	0	0	8	1.347
4	Bahrain	5	2	3	0	0	4	−0.549
5	Jersey	5	1	4	0	0	2	−0.579
6	Fiji	5	0	5	0	0	0	−3.022

No.	Date	Team 1	Captain 1	Team 2	Captain 2	Venue	Result
Group Stage
Match 1	20 February	Bahrain	Yaser Sadeq	Singapore	Munish Arora	Tribhuvan University International Cricket Ground, Kirtipur, Nepal	Singapore by 126
Match 2	20 February	Jersey	Ryan Driver	Nepal	Paras Khadka	Birendra Sainik Maha Vidyalaya Ground, Bhaktapur, Nepal	Nepal by 6 wickets
Match 3	20 February	Fiji	Josefa Rika	United States	Steve Massiah	Engineering Campus Ground, Lalitpur, Nepal	United States by 285 runs
Match 4	21 February	Jersey	Ryan Driver	Fiji	Josefa Rika	Tribhuvan University International Cricket Ground, Kirtipur, Nepal	Jersey by 9 wickets
Match 5	21 February	Bahrain	Yaser Sadeq	United States	Steve Massiah	Birendra Sainik Maha Vidyalaya Ground, Bhaktapur, Nepal	United States by 19 runs
Match 6	21 February	Nepal	Paras Khadka	Singapore	Munish Arora	Engineering Campus Ground, Lalitpur, Nepal	Nepal by 16 runs
Match 7	23 February	Jersey	Ryan Driver	United States	Steve Massiah	Tribhuvan University International Cricket Ground, Kirtipur, Nepal	United States by 66 runs
Match 8	23 February	Bahrain	Yaser Sadeq	Nepal	Paras Khadka	Birendra Sainik Maha Vidyalaya Ground, Bhaktapur, Nepal	Nepal by 8 wickets
Match 9	23 February	Fiji	Josefa Rika	Singapore	Munish Arora	Engineering Campus Ground, Lalitpur, Nepal	Singapore by 2 wickets
Match 10	24 February	Fiji	Josefa Rika	Nepal	Paras Khadka	Tribhuvan University International Cricket Ground, Kirtipur, Nepal	Nepal by 193 runs
Match 11	24 February	Bahrain	Yaser Sadeq	Jersey	Ryan Driver	Birendra Sainik Maha Vidyalaya Ground, Bhaktapur, Nepal	Bahrain by 27 runs
Match 12	24 February	United States	Steve Massiah	Singapore	Munish Arora	Engineering Campus Ground, Lalitpur, Nepal	Singapore by 99 runs
Match 13	26 February	Nepal	Paras Khadka	United States	Steve Massiah	Tribhuvan University International Cricket Ground, Kirtipur, Nepal	United States by 5 wickets
Match 14	26 February	Jersey	Ryan Driver	Singapore	Munish Arora	Birendra Sainik Maha Vidyalaya Ground, Bhaktapur, Nepal	Singapore by 7 wickets
Match 15	26 February	Bahrain	Yaser Sadeq	Fiji	Josefa Rika	Engineering Campus Ground, Lalitpur, Nepal	Bahrain by 95 runs

==== Playoffs ====
No.	Date	Team 1	Captain 1	Team 2	Captain 2	Venue	Result
Playoffs
Final	27 February	United States	Steve Massiah	Nepal	Paras Khadka	Tribhuvan University International Cricket Ground, Kirtipur, Nepal	Nepal by 5 wickets
3rd Playoff	27 February	Singapore	Munish Arora	Bahrain	Yaser Sadeq	Birendra Sainik Maha Vidyalaya Ground, Bhaktapur, Nepal	Bahrain by 3 wickets
5th Playoff	27 February	Jersey	Ryan Driver	Fiji	Josefa Rika	Engineering Campus Ground, Lalitpur, Nepal	Jersey by 5 wickets

===== Final Placings =====
After the conclusion of the tournament the teams were distributed as follows:

Pos	Team	Status
1st	Nepal	Promoted to Division Four for 2010
2nd	United States	Promoted to Division Four for 2010
3rd	Singapore	Remained in Division Five for 2012
4th	Bahrain	Remained in Division Five for 2012
5th	Jersey	Relegated to Division Six for 2011
6th	Fiji	Relegated to Division Six for 2011

=== Australia in New Zealand ===
No.	Date	Home captain	Away captain	Venue	Result
T20I series
T20I 148	26 February	Daniel Vettori	Michael Clarke	Westpac Stadium, Wellington	Australia by 6 wickets
T20I 149	28 February	Daniel Vettori	Michael Clarke	AMI Stadium, Christchurch	Match tied; New Zealand won the Super Over
ODI series
ODI 2966	3 March	Ross Taylor	Ricky Ponting	McLean Park, Napier	New Zealand by 2 wickets
ODI 2969	6 March	Daniel Vettori	Ricky Ponting	Eden Park, Auckland	Australia by 12 runs (D/L)
ODI 2971	9 March	Daniel Vettori	Ricky Ponting	Seddon Park, Hamilton	Australia by 6 wickets
ODI 2973	11 March	Daniel Vettori	Ricky Ponting	Eden Park, Auckland	Australia by 6 wickets (D/L)
ODI 2975	13 March	Daniel Vettori	Ricky Ponting	Westpac Stadium, Wellington	New Zealand by 51 runs
Test series
Test 1955	19–23 March	Daniel Vettori	Ricky Ponting	Basin Reserve, Wellington	Australia by 10 wickets
Test 1957	27–31 March	Daniel Vettori	Ricky Ponting	Seddon Park, Hamilton	Australia by 176 runs

=== Zimbabwe in West Indies ===
No.	Date	Home captain	Away captain	Venue	Result
T20I series
T20I 150	28 February	Denesh Ramdin	Prosper Utseya	Queen's Park Oval, Port of Spain, Trinidad	Zimbabwe by 26 runs
ODI series
ODI 2967	4 March	Chris Gayle	Prosper Utseya	Providence Stadium, Guyana	Zimbabwe by 2 runs
ODI 2970	6 March	Chris Gayle	Prosper Utseya	Providence Stadium, Guyana	West Indies by 4 wickets
ODI 2972	10 March	Chris Gayle	Prosper Utseya	Arnos Vale Ground, Kingstown, St Vincent	West Indies by 141 runs
ODI 2974	12 March	Chris Gayle	Prosper Utseya	Arnos Vale Ground, Kingstown, St Vincent	West Indies by 4 wickets
ODI 2976	14 March	Chris Gayle	Prosper Utseya	Arnos Vale Ground, Kingstown, St Vincent	West Indies by 4 wickets

=== England in Bangladesh ===
No.	Date	Home captain	Away captain	Venue	Result
ODI series
ODI 2964	28 February	Shakib Al Hasan	Alastair Cook	Sher-e-Bangla Cricket Stadium, Dhaka	England by 6 wickets
ODI 2965	2 March	Shakib Al Hasan	Alastair Cook	Sher-e-Bangla Cricket Stadium, Dhaka	England by 2 wickets
ODI 2968	5 March	Shakib Al Hasan	Alastair Cook	Jahur Ahmed Chowdhury Stadium, Chittagong	England by 45 runs
Test series
Test 1954	12–16 March	Shakib Al Hasan	Alastair Cook	Jahur Ahmed Chowdhury Stadium, Chittagong	England by 181 runs
Test 1956	20–24 March	Shakib Al Hasan	Alastair Cook	Sher-e-Bangla Cricket Stadium, Dhaka	England by 9 wickets

== Season summary ==
=== Result summary ===
	Test					ODI					T20I				
	Matches	Wins	Loss	Draw	Tied	Matches	Wins	Loss	Tied	No Result	Matches	Wins	Loss	Tied	No Result
Australia	8	7	0	1	0	26	20	4	0	2	5	4	0	1	0
Bangladesh	5	0	5	0	0	15	4	11	0	0	1	0	1	0	0
England	6	3	1	2	0	10	7	3	0	0	4	2	2	0	0
India	7	5	1	1	0	22	11	9	0	2	2	1	1	0	0
New Zealand	6	2	3	1	0	16	10	6	0	0	5	1	3	1	0
Pakistan	6	1	4	1	0	12	3	9	0	0	5	3	2	0	0
South Africa	6	2	2	2	0	11	5	6	0	0	2	1	1	0	0
Sri Lanka	3	0	2	1	0	13	6	6	0	1	2	1	1	0	0
West Indies	3	0	2	1	0	13	4	8	0	1	3	0	3	0	0
	First-class					ODI					T20I				
Zimbabwe	1	1	0	0	0	17	6	11	0	0	1	1	0	0	0
Afghanistan	2	2	0	0	0	2	1	1	0	0	6	4	2	0	0
Canada	1	0	1	0	0	2	1	1	0	0	4	1	3	0	0
(Republic of Ireland) Ireland	1	0	1	0	0	No Matches					6	3	3	0	0
Kenya	3	1	2	0	0	7	2	5	0	0	4	3	1	0	0
Netherlands	1	0	1	0	0	2	1	1	0	0	4	3	1	0	0
Scotland	1	1	0	0	0	No Matches					4	0	4	0	0
	First-class					List A					Twenty20				
Bermuda	No Matches					No Matches					No Matches				
Namibia	1	0	1	0	0	No Matches					No Matches				
United Arab Emirates	2	1	0	1	0	No Matches					No Matches				
Uganda	1	0	0	1	0	No Matches					4	0	4	0	0
United States	No First-class Status					No List A Status					3	1	2	0	0

=== Milestones ===
==== Test ====
- (India) Rahul Dravid reached 11,000 Test runs vs Sri Lanka on 16 November.
- (India) Sachin Tendulkar reached 13,000 Test runs vs Bangladesh on 17 January.

==== ODI ====
- (India) Sachin Tendulkar reached 17,000 ODI runs vs Australia on 5 November.

=== Records ===
==== Test ====
- (India) Sachin Tendulkar reached 13,000 runs in Test, vs Bangladesh on 17 January

==== ODI ====
- (India) Sachin Tendulkar reached 17,000 runs in ODI, vs Australia on 5 November. (1st time in the Cricket History)
- (India) Sachin Tendulkar became the 1st male cricketer to hit 200 in ODI, vs South Africa on 24 February.
