= English cricket team in Bangladesh in 2009–10 =

English cricket team in Bangladesh in 2010
	Bangladesh	England
- Dates: 28 February 2010 – 24 March 2010
Captains	Shakib Al Hasan	Alastair Cook

Test series
- Result: England won the 2-match series 2–0
Most runs	Tamim Iqbal (237)	Alastair Cook (342)
Most wickets	Shakib Al Hasan (9)	Graeme Swann (16)
- Player of the series: Graeme Swann (Eng)

One Day International series
- Results: England won the 3-match series 3–0
Most runs	Tamim Iqbal (155)	Eoin Morgan (179)
Most wickets	Shafiul Islam (5); Abdur Razzak (5); Shakib Al Hasan (5)	Tim Bresnan (8)
- Player of the series: Eoin Morgan (Eng)

The England cricket team toured Bangladesh at the end of the 2009–10 cricket season, playing three One Day Internationals (ODI) and two Test matches. Regular England captain Andrew Strauss controversially missed the tour to rest for the 2010–11 Ashes series, so the team was led for the first time by Alastair Cook. Bangladesh were captained by all-rounder Shakib Al Hasan.

England whitewashed Bangladesh in both the Test and ODI series, maintaining their record as the only Test-playing nation not to have been beaten by the Bangladeshis. England gave debuts to five players during the series, including South African-born Craig Kieswetter, which drew criticism over the number of foreign-born players in the England team, particularly from former England captain Michael Vaughan.

== Background ==
In the 12 previous matches played between the two sides – four Test matches and eight ODIs – England had a 100% winning record against Bangladesh, the only international team able to boast such a record. The previous year, Bangladesh had claimed their first Test series victory against a senior Test nation, though it came against a West Indies side that was heavily weakened because of an industrial dispute. England came into the tour on the back of a two-and-a-half-month series against South Africa in which they had secured a 2–1 ODI series win, while the Test and Twenty20 International series had been tied.

== Squads ==
The England and Wales Cricket Board (ECB) announced in September 2009 that it "[had] to prioritise" and would most likely be sending a weakened squad to tour Bangladesh. The press theorised that possible candidates to be rested included captain Andrew Strauss, Paul Collingwood, Stuart Broad and James Anderson. When the squad was officially announced in January 2010, only Strauss and Anderson were omitted from the touring squad. The reason given for Anderson's break was to give him opportunity to undergo a specialist review and rehabilitation for a chronic injury to his right knee, to enable him to return to full fitness for the 2010 ICC World Twenty20. The decision to rest Strauss was rationalised by national selector Geoff Miller as "the selectors feel it is important that he takes a break ahead of an extremely busy programme of international cricket". This decision was not universally accepted, with former England captains Ian Botham and Michael Atherton among those who spoke out against the move; Botham claimed: "As captain you need to be there with your team ... I think it’s a major mistake."

England called up three uncapped players, naming bowlers Ajmal Shahzad and James Tredwell in both squads, and opening batsman Michael Carberry in the Test squad. Following a string of impressive performances for the England Lions, South African-born wicket-keeper batsman Craig Kieswetter was added to the ODI squad. Kieswetter had only completed his qualification period for England on the day before his first Lions match, (Note: Kieswetter qualified for England on the basis of his dual-nationality, but as a foreign-born national, he had to be resident in England for a set period before he was eligible to be selected.) and had previously represented South Africa Under-19s. Former England captain Michael Vaughan was unhappy with the inclusion of Kieswetter in the squad, and said that in an ideal world he would like to see "11 complete Englishmen in the team," and complained that he had "a problem, that we have almost got a 'ship-in' system of looking at talent". Injuries to Ryan Sidebottom, Graham Onions and Broad prompted England to call up Steven Finn as cover for the Test series, and Tim Bresnan remained with the squad after originally only being part of the ODI squad.

In contrast to the selection issues and injury problems surrounding England, Bangladesh came into the tour with a relatively stable squad. Uncapped players Nasir Hossain and Suhrawadi Shuvo were both named in the ODI squad, and Mashrafe Mortaza was fit to play after making it through the warm-up game against England for the BCB XI, having not played since July 2009 due to a knee injury. After playing in the first ODI, Mortaza withdrew from the squad for the remaining ODIs and Test matches, citing a disagreement over his fitness. The Bangladesh chairman of selectors, Rafiqul Alam, announced that Mortaza had withdrawn himself "to be by the side of his ailing mother". Mohammad Ashraful, Bangladesh's most-capped player, was omitted from the Test squad as he had failed to convince the selectors that he was in the right frame of mind for international cricket. The day after the squad had been announced, Bangladesh's preparations for the opening Test match were "thrown into disarray" when Raqibul Hasan announced his retirement from international cricket at the age of 22. It was reported that the retirement was due to Raqibul's displeasure at being omitted from the provisional squad for the 2010 ICC World Twenty20. Uncapped Jahurul Islam was called into the squad to replace him.

England
Batsmen: Alastair Cook (captain); Paul Collingwood (vice-captain); Ian Bell; Michael Carberry; Joe Denly; Eoin Morgan; Kevin Pietersen; Jonathan Trott; All-rounders: Tim Bresnan; Luke Wright	Wicket-keepers: Steven Davies; Craig Kieswetter; Matt Prior; Bowlers: Stuart Broad; Steven Finn; Graham Onions; Liam Plunkett; Ajmal Shahzad; Ryan Sidebottom; Graeme Swann; James Tredwell

Bangladesh
Batsmen: Aftab Ahmed; Imrul Kayes; Jahurul Islam; Junaid Siddique; Tamim Iqbal; All-rounders: Shakib Al Hasan (captain); Mahmudullah; Naeem Islam	Wicket-keepers: Mushfiqur Rahim (vice-captain); Bowlers: Abdur Razzak; Enamul Haque Jr; Mashrafe Mortaza; Rubel Hossain; Shafiul Islam; Shahadat Hossain; Suhrawadi Shuvo

== ODI series ==
=== 1st ODI ===
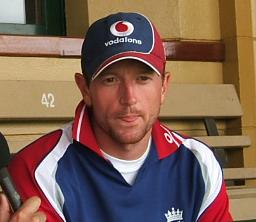
Paul Collingwood's patient 75 helped England to victory in the match.

After winning the toss, England opted to put Bangladesh into bat, but their new-ball bowlers failed to maintain a good line and length, providing opener Tamim Iqbal with plenty of bad deliveries to put away for boundaries. Their breakthrough came in the 10th over, when Bresnan bowled a slower ball to Imrul Kayes who found a leading edge and was caught by Luke Wright at mid-on. Two more wickets followed closely as Junaid Siddique hit a half-volley softly to the fielder at square leg in the next over, and then Aftab Ahmed was run out in the 13th over, leaving Bangladesh with 82 runs for the loss of three wickets (82/3). Captain Shakib Al Hasan and vice-captain Mushfiqur Rahim both provided Tamim with some support, but both were undone by their own rashness; Shakib advanced down the wicket to Graeme Swann and provided an edge for Matt Prior to catch behind the stumps, while Mushfiqur attempted a run which was never available and presented Kevin Pietersen with his second run out of the match. Tamim alone provided resistance, showing "imperious strokeplay all around the ground" and a measure of maturity in his innings. His 125 came off 120 balls, including 13 fours and 3 sixes, eventually being dismissed in the 43rd over, bowled by Broad, with Bangladesh on 214/9. The final two batsmen lasted three overs, adding 14 to score, leaving England requiring 229 to win.

In England's reply, captain Alastair Cook played in a fashion reminiscent of the man he had replaced for the tour, Strauss, as he played an accumulatory innings to score 64. Kieswetter, who had been brought into the team to provide firepower at the start of the innings was outscored by Cook 4 to 1, and was nearly dismissed twice in his first over, offering an edge to wicket-keeper Mushfiqur Rahim, and two balls later he was caught in front, but umpire Rod Tucker ruled that he was not out. Kieswetter was dismissed in the 13th over for 19, completely missing a drive to present Mushfiqur with an easy stumping. An over later, Kevin Pietersen fell for just one run, leaving England on 74/2. Cook and new man Collingwood put on 22 runs before the opener was adjudged leg before wicket (LBW) though replays indicated that the ball was missing the stumps on the leg side. Collingwood then anchored the chase with Eoin Morgan, the pair adding 88 runs to the score. After the dismissal of Morgan on 33, it was left to Prior to join Collingwood to add the required runs, and England won with four overs to spare.

28 February
Scorecard

Bangladesh; 228 (45.4 overs)	v	England; 229/4 (46 overs)
Tamim Iqbal 125 (120); Graeme Swann 3/32 (10 overs)		Paul Collingwood 75* (100); Naeem Islam 3/49 (10 overs)

England won by 6 wickets
Sher-e-Bangla National Cricket Stadium, Dhaka
Umpires: Nadir Shah (Ban) and Rod Tucker (Aus)
Player of the match: Tamim Iqbal (Ban)

- England won the toss and elected to field.

=== 2nd ODI ===
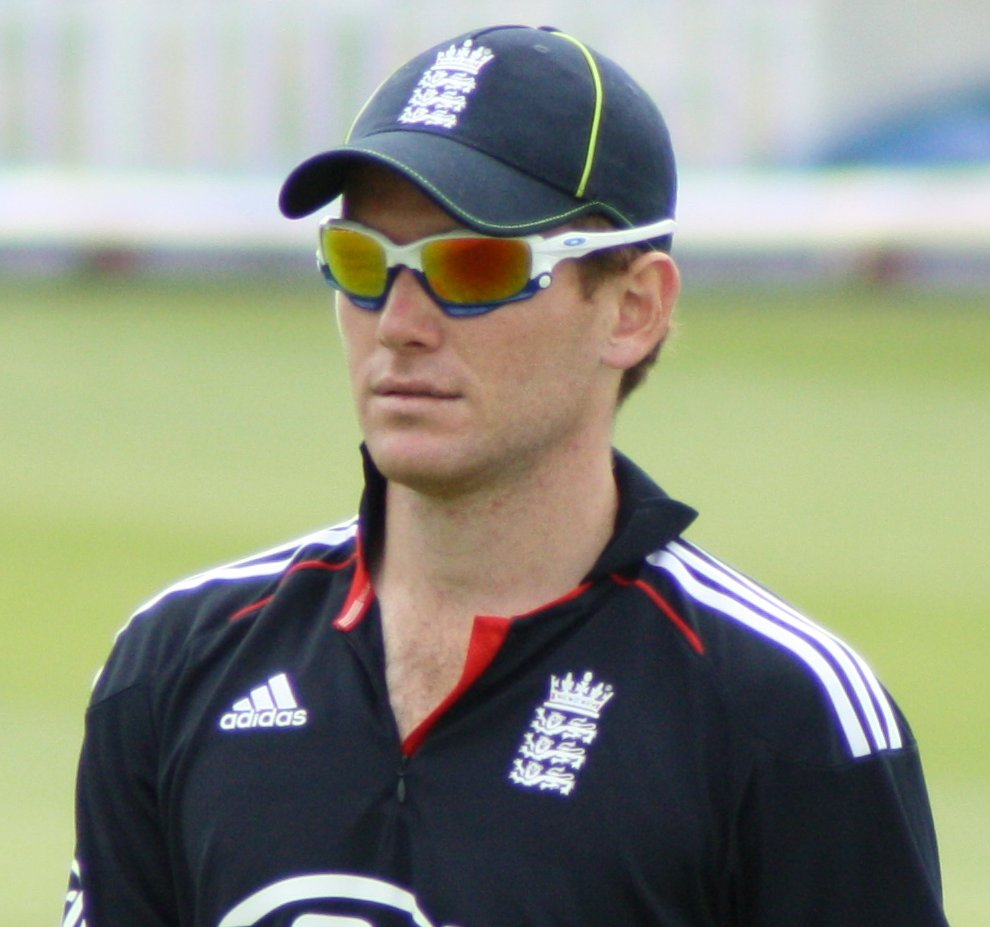
Eoin Morgan's unbeaten 110 runs earned him the Man of the Match accolade in the second ODI.

Both sides made changes going into the second ODI; for England, Sidebottom made way as England opted to hand a debut to Tredwell in order to play two spinners, while Bangladesh called on Shuvo and Rubel Hossain, dropping Siddique and Mortaza. For the second consecutive match, England won the toss and chose to field. The match began in similar fashion to the first ODI, with two quick wickets in the 10th and 11th overs taking Bangladesh from 46/0 to 56/2. However, a third-wicket partnership of 90 between Kayes and Rahim steadied the innings and helped Bangladesh to gain confidence. After Imrul Kayes' dismissal, Rahim increased his scoring-rate with a series of boundaries to take the score past 200, and was dismissed by a slower ball from Bresnan with the score at 211/5. Some late swinging from the tail saw Bangladesh finish on 260/6, their highest total in ODIs against England.

England lost opener Kieswetter in the first over; caught at first slip off the third ball of the innings, having been dropped by the keeper the ball before. Pietersen and Collingwood were both trapped LBW by Abdur Razzak without passing 20, and Morgan joined Cook in the middle with the score at 68/3. Initially, Morgan supported his captain by rotating the strike, but when Cook was dismissed for a 61-ball 60, he played with more freedom. A partnership of 90 with wicket-keeper Prior brought England close to 200, but Wright, Bresnan and Swann all fell cheaply, leaving England requiring 31 runs off 26 balls with only two wickets remaining. With England "seemingly in disarray", Morgan took control of the match, and completed the run-chase with three boundaries in five balls. Morgan finished the game with 110 not out, his first century for England.

2 March
Scorecard

Bangladesh; 260/6 (50 overs)	v	England; 261/8 (48.5 overs)
Imrul Kayes 63 (113); Tim Bresnan 3/51 (10 overs)		Eoin Morgan 110* (104); Shakib Al Hasan 3/32 (10 overs)

England won by 2 wickets
Sher-e-Bangla National Cricket Stadium, Dhaka
Umpires: Nadir Shah (Ban) and Rod Tucker (Aus)
Player of the match: Eoin Morgan (Eng)

- England won the toss and elected to field.
- Eoin Morgan (Eng) became the first player to score an ODI hundred for two nations.

=== 3rd ODI ===
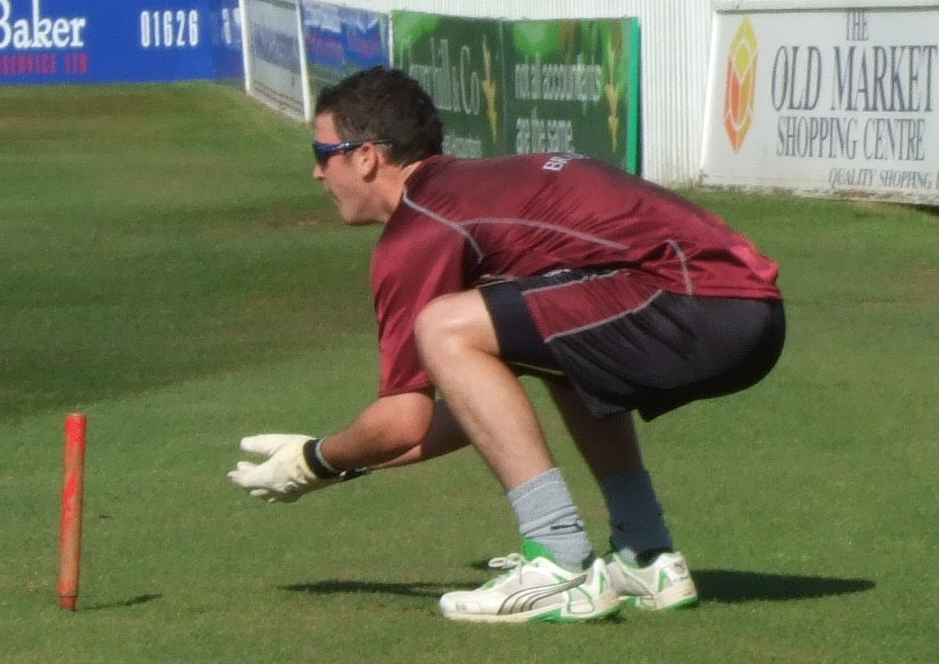
Craig Kieswetter scored his debut international century in his third ODI.

The third ODI saw a change of venue; the teams moving from Dhaka to the coastal town of Chittagong. England again made two bowling changes, seamers Shahzad and Liam Plunkett coming into the team with the injured Broad and spinner Tredwell making way. Bangladesh remained unchanged from the second ODI. The hosts won their first toss of the series, and put England into bat. Kieswetter bucked his natural game and played cautiously: when partner Cook was dismissed for 32 in the 13th over, he had scored 20 off 33 balls. The opener continued to accumulate runs carefully until he reached his half-century in the 33rd over. After passing the milestone, he began to score quicker, cutting and driving as he shared a 74-run partnership with Collingwood. He reached his century with a scampered run off Rubel Hossain, his first in international cricket, in his third ODI appearance. At 22 years and 97 days old, he became the second youngest England batsman to score an ODI century after David Gower. In contrast to the "all-action" style that had been expected from him, Kieswetter accrued his century with resolve, saying after the match that: "In the first two games I wasn't quite aware tactically of how I was going to pace my innings, [in terms of] helping the team win the game. Today I tried to pace myself a bit more, and try to get myself in more before playing big shots." His dismissal soon after his century brought Wright to the crease with the freedom to make an aggressive cameo, notching 32 runs off just 13 balls to help England towards a total of 284.

In response, Bangladesh lost Tamim Iqbal for a duck in the first over, giving debutant Ajmal Shahzad his first ODI wicket from his third ball of the match. Bresnan removed the other Bangladeshi opener in the 10th over, the first of his four wickets in the match. This wicket brought together Mushfiqur Rahim and Aftab Ahmed, who both played aggressively, putting on 56 together in the next ten overs, but when Aftab Ahmed was run out looking for a non-existent run, Bangladesh started to struggle. Rahim and Shakib Al Hasan both fell after making good starts and the required run rate started to rise, making a Bangladeshi victory look improbable. Slow scoring between Naeem Islam and Mahmudullah took victory further away, and Bangladesh eventually finished 45 runs short of their target, granting England a series whitewash.

5 March
Scorecard

England; 284/5 (50 overs)	v	Bangladesh; 239/9 (50 overs)
Craig Kieswetter 107 (123); Abdur Razzak 2/40 (10 overs)		Aftab Ahmed 46 (60); Tim Bresnan 4/28 (9 overs)

England won by 45 runs
Zohur Ahmed Chowdhury Stadium, Chittagong
Umpires: Enamul Haque (Ban) and Rod Tucker (Aus)
Player of the match: Craig Kieswetter (Eng)

- Bangladesh won the toss and elected to field.

== Test series ==
=== 1st Test ===
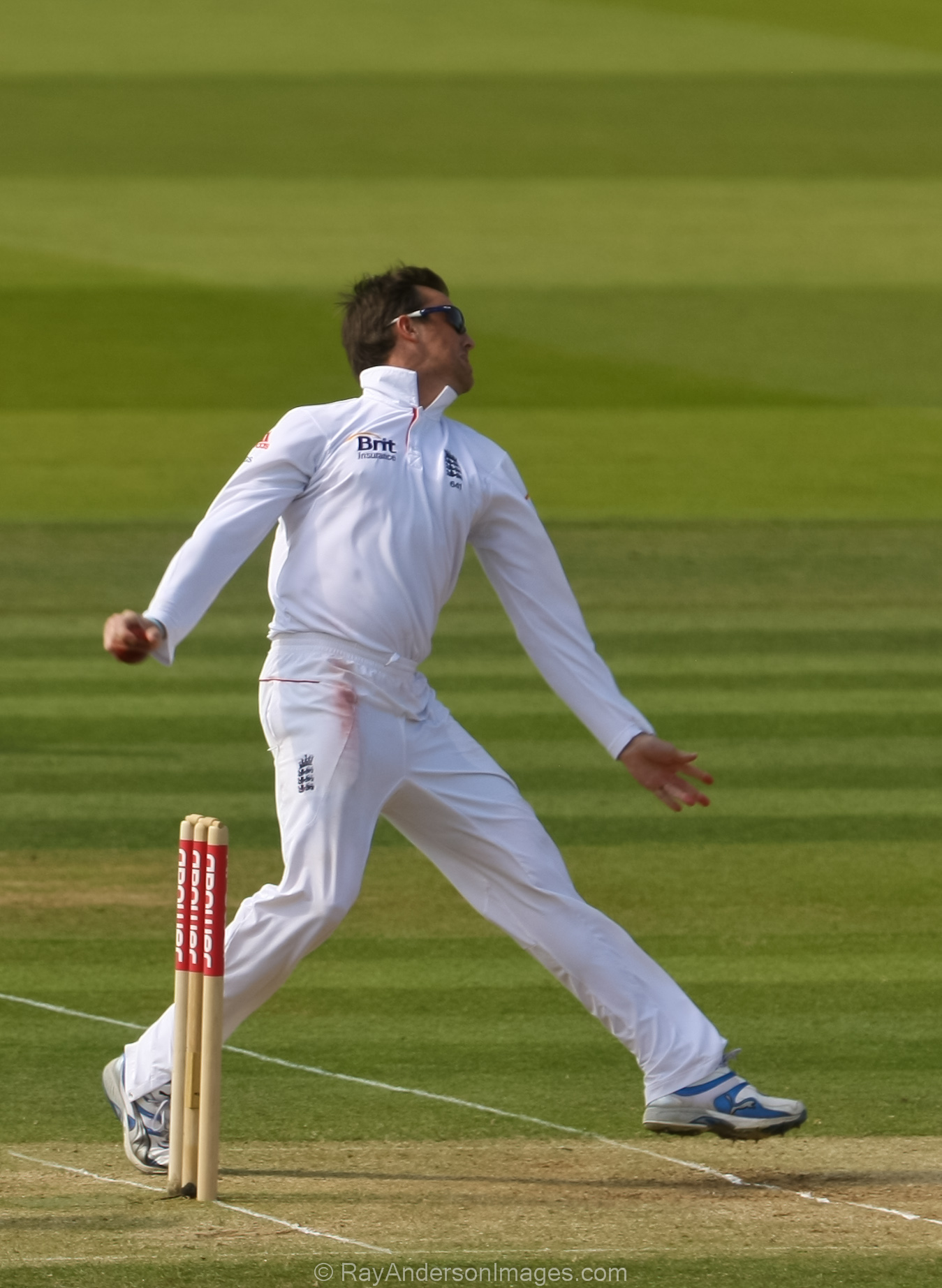
Graeme Swann's 10 wickets in the first Test resulted in him rising to second place in the ICC's Test bowling rankings.

The teams remained in Chittagong for the first Test, in which England gave Test debuts to Finn and Carberry. Bangladesh's preparations for the match were disrupted when middle-order batsman Hasan announced his retirement from international cricket two days earlier, and although Jahurul Islam was called into the squad to replace him, it was Aftab Ahmed who took his place in the team for the Test. Bangladesh won the toss, and made "among the most unfathomable calls", putting England into bat on a surface that looked certain to deteriorate. Cook capitalised on the decision, being "barely troubled" as he remained 158 not out at the close of the first day, having faced 244 balls. Debutant Carberry out-scored Cook early on, but fell on 30 going for an ambitious sweep against Mahmudullah. His wicket brought in Jonathan Trott who scored slowly but confidently until he was wrongly dismissed on 39. A bouncing ball hit his helmet and was caught by wicket-keeper Rahim, prompting the umpire to give him out caught. Pietersen, who had been struggling against left-arm spin bowling, adjusted his style of play during his innings, staying more leg-side of the ball. He scored 99 runs, falling just short of a century when he was bowled by left-arm spinner Razzak. Collingwood, who scored 145 runs, and Ian Bell, who added 84 runs, increased the run rate during the second day to propel England to 599 for 6, at which point they declared, half an hour before the tea interval.

England took advantage of bowling at their hosts before tea, with Broad dismissing Kayes and Siddique with bouncers. Shortly after the break, Swann claimed the wicket of Aftab Ahmed in his first over; caught at short leg. Bangladesh had lost three wickets with only 51 runs scored, but a partnership of 94 by Iqbal and Mahmudullah brought their side back into the match. Mahmudullah was caught in the slips just after reaching his half-century, and his captain Shakib Al Hasan followed before the end of the day. Iqbal was dismissed in the third over of the following day, and nine overs later Shahadat Hossain was also dismissed, leaving Bangladesh 416 runs behind with only three wickets remaining. Thoughts of a quick victory were quashed by a Bangladesh record partnership for the eighth-wicket by Rahim and Naeem Islam, who added 113 runs together. Rahim played defiantly, batting for 152 balls to reach score his 79 runs, and was described by Cricinfo's Andrew McGlashan as a "lesson to the more impetuous of his team-mates". The partnership was eventually broken by a run out by Carberry, and Bangladesh added no more runs for the final two wickets to finish on 296: over 300 runs behind.

As they were playing a four-man bowling attack, and had spent longer in the field than they had wanted, England opted not to enforce the follow-on. Batting again, England pressed to score quickly, but were pegged back by regular dismissals: no batsman scored more than 40 runs, and the run rate was much the same as their first innings. Shakib Al Hasan claimed four wickets, and England batting 50 minutes into the fourth morning before declaring on 209 for 7, leaving Bangladesh requiring 513 runs in their second innings to win.

Bangladesh lost wickets at regular intervals at the start of their innings; by the end of the 38th over, they had lost five wickets. Rahim joined Siddique after the fifth wicket fell, and the pair batted patiently together to see their side through to force the match into its final day. The partnership continued to battle during the fifth morning of the match, and Siddique reached his first Test century, coming from 262 deliveries. Shortly after, Prior failed to take a difficult catch, but Siddique did not capitalise on the mistake, adding no more runs before he was caught in the slips shortly after lunch. The bowler, Swann, swore at Siddique as he walked off the pitch, something he later apologised for, saying that it was "a testament to him that he did get everyone frustrated." Rahim was bowled by Swann four overs later, and despite a late assault by Naeem Islam, who scored three fours and three sixes before being becoming Swann's 10th victim of the match, England won by 181 runs. Swann, who took five wickets in each innings, was the first English off spinner since Jim Laker in 1956 to take 10 wickets in a match. His performance in the match led to him rising to second place in the ICC Test bowling rankings.

12–16 March
Scorecard

England	v	Bangladesh
599/6d (138.3 overs); Alastair Cook 173 (283); Mahmudullah 2/78 (23 overs)		296 (90.3 overs); Tamim Iqbal 86 (124); Graeme Swann 5/90 (29.3 overs)
209/7d (49.3 overs); Ian Bell 39* (55); Shakib Al Hasan 4/62 (16.3 overs)		331 (124 overs); Junaid Siddique 106 (292); Graeme Swann 5/127 (49 overs)

England won by 181 runs
Zohur Ahmed Chowdhury Stadium, Chittagong
Umpires: Tony Hill (NZ) and Rod Tucker (Aus)
Player of the match: Graeme Swann (Eng)

- Bangladesh won the toss and elected to field.

=== 2nd Test ===
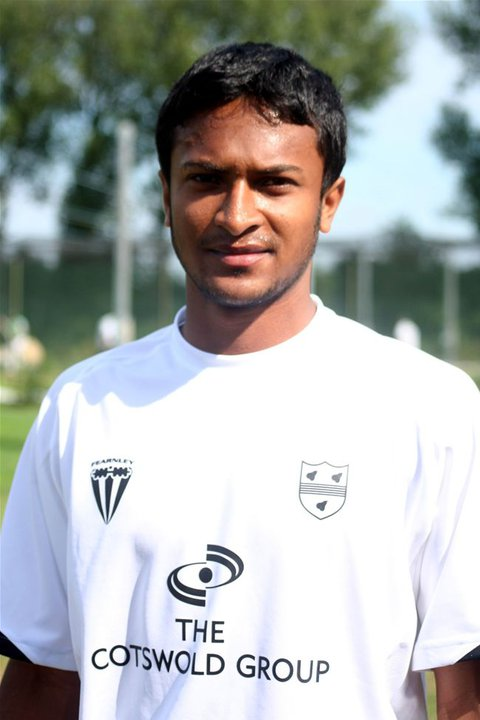
Shakib Al Hasan was named man of the match, despite England winning the Test match.

The teams returned to Dhaka for the second Test, and made three changes; Bangladesh selected Shafiul Islam and Jahurul Islam to replace Aftab Ahmed and Shahadat Hossain, while England added a second spinner, with Carberry making way for Tredwell. The toss was once again won by Bangladesh, who opted to bat first. Tamim Iqbal, on his 21st birthday, scored runs with freedom on the first morning, reaching a half-century from 34 balls. He was dropped twice before that, by Collingwood and Cook, but his innings was described by David Hopps in Wisden Cricketers' Alamanack as "taking something normally sedate and slightly forbidding, and making it wild and intoxicating." Tamim's batting drew interest that he could become the fifth player in Test history to score a century on the first morning, but he was dismissed by Tredwell for 85, attempting a sweep. Swann, who had been particularly expensive against Tamim, took wickets either side of lunch to leave Bangladesh on 167 for 4. Shakib and Mahmudullah steadied the innings, scoring 59 runs together, before both were dismissed in close succession. Another patient partnership between Mushfiqur Rahim and Naeem Islam took Bangladesh past 300 runs. On the second morning, Bangladesh pressed aggressively, particularly through Shafiul Islam, who scored a half-century at just quicker than a run-a-ball. Cook's captaincy was criticised in Wisden, where Hopps claimed that Cook's fields "defied logic", while ESPNcricinfo's Sahil Dutta described his captaincy as "more robotic than insightful". Naeem Islam remained 59 not out as Bangladesh were bowled out for 419.

In England's response, Shakib opted to use his spinners to minimise scoring opportunities, a tactic which led to Cook's dismissal for 21. His fellow opener, Trott, scored his first run from his 33rd delivery, and continued to bat circumspectly throughout the second day. Pietersen attempted to score more quickly, though it took a bad over from Razzak to allow him to do so. A misjudged shot after leaving his crease resulted in him being caught, and Collingwood followed soon after, leg before wicket from his third delivery. Bell joined Trott in the middle, and the pair added 67 runs together before Trott was dismissed for 64. Prior capitalised on more bad bowling from Razzak to reach his half-century, but fell shortly after, giving Bangladesh hope of a first-innings lead. Bell and Bresnan took England to the brink of a lead, adding 143 runs together, including a century for Bell. It was the first occasion on which Bell had scored a century in Test cricket without a teammate having already done so in the innings, a statistic that had been used to suggest he could not score run in tough conditions. Speaking about his century, Bell alluded to that statistic, stating that he had "put a few things to bed." After his dismissal, Bresnan batted with the tail, taking his score to 91, and England's to 496, a lead of 77 runs. After the third day, Bangladesh's captain, Shakib, criticised the Bangladesh Cricket Board for not paying for the use of the Umpire Decision Review System. He believed that a number of the umpiring decisions had gone against his side, and the technology could have given his side a better chance of their first Test win over England.

Bangladesh's second innings started in similar fashion to their first; they lost the early wicket of Imrul Kayes, and Tamim scored a quick half-century. The latter was dropped three times before being caught by Broad for 52 runs. Junaid and Jahurul both made good starts for Bangladesh, but were out for 34 and 43 respectively, which along with low scores for Mahmudullah and Mushfiqur left Bangladesh on 172 for six at the end of the fourth day. On the final morning, Shakib batted resiliently with the lower-order batsmen and narrowly missed out on a century; he was the last man out, stumped attempting to score a boundary to reach the landmark. His batting had helped establish a 208 run lead for Bangladesh, which resulted in England requiring just under four runs per over to reach the total.

In England's chase, Trott was the only batsman dismissed, run out for 19, although replays suggested that it was possibly the wrong decision. Cook scored his second century of the series, and Pietersen finished on 74, scored at just under a run-a-ball. Bangladesh's bowling attack was tired, and rarely threatened England; Pietersen even opted to switch hit some deliveries. In Wisden, Hopps, who had described the second morning as being possibly "England's lowest point of a long winter", contrastingly said of the final day; "England's supremacy had rarely looked so marked." Despite England's victory, which maintained their one hundred percent winning record against Bangladesh, Shakib was named as man of the match.

20–24 March
Scorecard

Bangladesh	v	England
419 (117.1 overs); Tamim Iqbal 85 (71); Graeme Swann 4/114 [36.1]		496 (173.3 overs); Ian Bell 138 (262); Shakib Al Hasan 4/124 [66]
285 (102 overs); Shakib Al Hasan 96 (191); James Tredwell 4/82 [34]		209/1 (44 overs); Alastair Cook 109* (156)

England won by 9 wickets
Sher-e-Bangla National Cricket Stadium, Dhaka
Umpires: Tony Hill (NZ) and Rod Tucker (Aus)
Player of the match: Shakib Al Hasan (Ban)

- Bangladesh won the toss and elected to bat.

== Tour matches ==
=== 50-over tour matches: Bangladesh Cricket Board XI v England XI ===
England won both of their one-day warm-up matches against the Bangladesh Cricket Board XI comfortably. In the first match, England batted first and scored 370 runs, during which Kieswetter and Collingwood both posted centuries while scoring quicker than a-run-a-ball. ESPNcricinfo described Kieswetter's century as ensuring "he will be making his England debut in the first ODI". In the next match, which was shortened to 37 overs per side, England bowled first and restricted their hosts to 151 runs. Tredwell bowled particularly economically, allowing just 17 runs from his seven overs. In their response, England reached the winning total with 70 balls to spare. Cook and Prior both scored half-centuries.

23 February
Scorecard

England XI; 370/7 (50 overs)	v	Bangladesh Cricket Board XI; 258/9 (50 overs)
Craig Kieswetter 143 (123); Tapash Baisya 3/72 (9 overs)		Sharifullah 47 (55); Graeme Swann 4/44 (10 overs)

England XI won by 112 runs
Fatullah Osmani Stadium, Fatullah
Umpires: Morshed Ali Khan (Ban) and Tanvir Ahmed (Ban)

- Bangladesh Cricket Board XI won the toss and elected to field.

25 February
Scorecard

Bangladesh Cricket Board XI; 151/8 (37 overs)	v	England XI; 155/3 (25.2 overs)
Tanveer Haider 35 (54); James Tredwell 2/17 (7 overs)		Matt Prior 64* (57); Alauddin Babu 1/30 (6 overs)

England XI won by 7 wickets
Fatullah Osmani Stadium, Fatullah
Umpires: Anisur Rahman (Ban) and Masudur Rahman (Ban)

- Bangladesh Cricket Board XI won the toss and elected to bat.
- Rain reduced the match to 37 overs per team.

=== Three-day tour match: Bangladesh A v England XI ===
7–9 March
Scorecard

Bangladesh A	v	England XI
202 (70.2 overs); Raqibul Hasan 107* (165); James Tredwell 6/95 (27.2 overs)		281/7d (58 overs); Jonathan Trott 101 (139); Mahbubul Alam 2/38 (9 overs)
362/6d (76 overs); Shuvagoto Hom 91* (30); James Tredwell 2/57 (20 overs)		185/5 (52 overs); Alastair Cook 42 (80); Mohammad Ashraful 3/76 (21 overs)

Match drawn
Zohur Ahmed Chowdhury Stadium, Chittagong
Umpires: Mahfuzur Rahman and Sharfuddoula

- Bangladesh A won the toss and elected to bat.
