= Munish Arora =

Indian born Singaporean Cricketer

Personal information
- Born: 10 March 1971 (age 55); Ambala, Haryana, India
- Batting: Left-handed
- Bowling: Left-arm orthodox spin
- Role: Bowler

Domestic team information
- Years: Team
- 1990–1996: Punjab
- 1998: Bengal
- FC debut: 25 November 1990 Punjab v Jammu and Kashmir
- Last FC: 22 November 1998 Bengal v Orissa
- LA debut: 18 December 1993 Punjab v Delhi
- Last LA: 21 November 1998 Bengal v Orissa

Career statistics
Competition	First-class	List A
Matches	12	10
Runs scored	417	62
Batting average	32.07	15.50
100s/50s	0/4	0/0
Top score	75	25*
Balls bowled	1,025	336
Wickets	19	6
Bowling average	21.42	34.66
5 wickets in innings	1	0
10 wickets in match	1	0
Best bowling	6/60	2/16
Catches/stumpings	9/–	5/–
- Source: CricketArchive, 9 August 2008

Munish Arora (born 10 March 1971) is an Indian born Singaporean cricketer. A left-handed batsman and left-arm orthodox spin bowler, he has played for the Singapore national cricket team since 2004, having previously played first-class cricket in his native India between 1990 and 1998.

Born in Haryana in 1971, Arora made his first class debut for Punjab in a Ranji Trophy match against Jammu and Kashmir in November 1990. He played first-class cricket for them until February 1993 and made his List A debut for them against Delhi later that year.

He continued playing for Punjab in that form of the game until January 1996, and played his final List A game for Bengal against Orissa in November 1998. He returned to first-class cricket for Bengal against Orissa the following day, playing his last first-class match to date.

He first played for Singapore in February 2004 when he played in the Stan Nagaiah Trophy series against Malaysia. He played in the Saudara Cup match against the same opponents the same year. He played the Saudara Cup match again in 2005, and the Stan Nagaia Trophy again in 2006, also playing in the ACC Trophy and an ACC Premier League match against Hong Kong that year.

He played in the Saudara Cup match again in 2007 and most recently represented his country in the 2008 ACC Trophy in Kuala Lumpur.
