= Yaser Sadeq =

Bahraini cricketer (born 1975)

Personal information
- Born: 29 November 1975 (age 50)

International information
- National side: Bahrain
- Source: Cricinfo, 15 July 2015

Yaser Sadeq (born 29 November 1975) is a cricketer who plays for the Bahrain national cricket team. He played in the 2013 ICC World Cricket League Division Six tournament.
