= Cricket in Bangladesh =

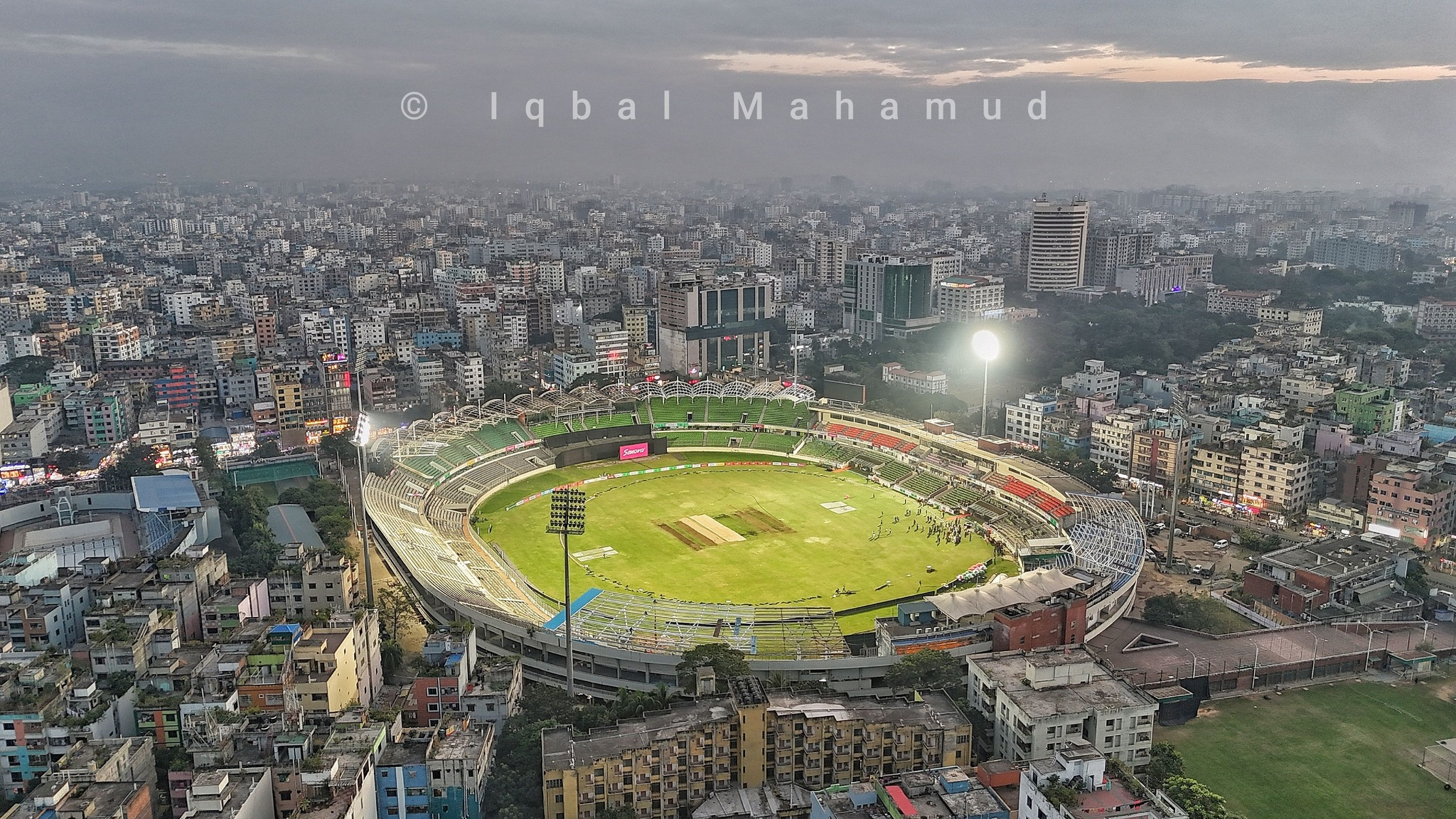
- Sher-e-Bangla National Cricket Stadium in Mirpur, Dhaka
- Country: Bangladesh
- Governing body: Bangladesh Cricket Board
- National teams: Bangladesh Men; Bangladesh Women; Bangladesh U-19 Men; Bangladesh U-19 Women; Bangladesh A Men; Bangladesh A Women
- Clubs: 7(BPL)

National competitions
- List: First Class Cricket; National Cricket League; Bangladesh Cricket League; Bangladesh Women's Cricket League; List A Cricket; Dhaka Premier Division Cricket League; Bangladesh Women's National Cricket League; T20 Cricket; Dhaka Premier Division Twenty20 Cricket League; National Cricket League Twenty20

Club competitions
- List: Bangladesh Premier League

International competitions
- List: Men’s national team; ICC World Test Championship: 9th (2019-21, 2021-23); Cricket World Cup: Quarter-final (2015); ICC Men's T20 World Cup: Super 8 (2007, 2024); ICC Champions Trophy: Semi-final (2017); Asia Cup: Runners-up (2012, 2016, 2018); Commonwealth Games: Group Stage (1998); Asian Games: Gold Medal (2010); Men’s U-19 national team; Under-19 Cricket World Cup: Champions (2020); ACC Under-19 Asia Cup:Champions (2023, 2024); Bangladesh A cricket team; ACC Emerging Teams Asia Cup: Runner Up (2019); Women's national team; ICC Women's Cricket World Cup: 7th (2022); ICC Women's T20 World Cup: Round 1 (2014, 2016, 2018, 2020, 2023); Women's Asia Cup : Champions (2018); Commonwealth Games: Group Stage (2022); Asian Games: Siver Medal (2010, 2014); Women's U-19 national team; Under-19 Women's T20 World Cup: Super 6 (2023); ACC Under-19 Women's T20 Asia Cup: Runners-up (2024); Bangladesh A women's cricket team; ACC Women's T20 Emerging Teams Asia Cup: Runners-up (2023)

Cricket is the most popular dry season sport in Bangladesh. It is played nationwide through the months of November to May. Governance of the sport is the responsibility of the Bangladesh Cricket Board (BCB), which was established in 1972. Bangladesh is a full member of the International Cricket Council (ICC) and the Asian Cricket Council. Full ICC membership was achieved in 2000 and the Bangladesh men's team played its inaugural Test match that year. The national team is known as the "Tigers" – after the Royal Bengal Tiger. The women's national team has played top-level international cricket since 2014.

Bangladesh has three nationwide domestic competitions. The most lucrative is the Bangladesh Premier League (BPL), a Twenty20 tournament played in January and February which attracts international players from other countries. There are two first-class championships: the National Cricket League, played by teams representing the country's administrative divisions; and the Bangladesh Cricket League, played by zonal teams.

== History ==
Cricket was introduced to Bengal by the British in the eighteenth century. Following Partition and the creation of East Pakistan, both first-class and Test cricket were played there during the 1950s and 1960s. The sport continued to be popular after independence, especially in Dhaka, but the country lost first-class status and had to establish itself in international competition as an Associate Member of the International Cricket Council (ICC).

Progress was made in the 1990s. The Bangladesh men's team won the 1997 ICC Trophy and made a good showing at the 1999 Cricket World Cup. Beginning in 1994, Bangladesh Cricket Board (BCB) in preparation for full membership of the ICC, began instituting multi-day matches in domestic tournaments starting with the 1993-94 National Cricket Championship (with the semi-finals and final being two-day matches each of a single innings per team 60 and 80 overs respectively) and then continuing again (after a return to the traditional one day formats in 1995 and 1996) for the 1997, 1998/99 and 1999 National Cricket Championships with teams playing multiple innings over 3 days for the semi-finals and 4 days for the final. Also only for the 1998/99 season of Dhaka Premier Division Cricket League the BCB introduced two-day matches of 80 overs per side. In the 1999–2000 season, the Bangladesh Cricket Board (BCB) in the final push for full membership, created the National Cricket League (NCL). In November 2000, Bangladesh played their inaugural Test match against India at the Bangabandhu National Stadium in Dhaka. The NCL was granted first-class status ahead of the 2000–01 season.

== Administration ==
The Bangladesh Cricket Board (BCB) is the principal national governing body of cricket in Bangladesh.It became an associate member of the International Cricket Council (ICC) in 1977, and a full member on 26 June 2000. BCB has three teams which represent Bangladesh in international cricket, which are the Bangladesh men's national cricket team, Bangladesh women's national cricket team and Bangladesh under-19 cricket team.

The board's headquarters are located at the Sher-e-Bangla National Cricket Stadium in Mirpur, Dhaka.

== National teams ==
The Bangladesh national cricket team is governed by the Bangladesh Cricket Board (BCB) and is a member of the Asian Cricket Council (ACC). Since 1977, the BCB has been affiliated with ICC, the international governing body for world cricket. In 1983, the BCB became one of the founding members of the ACC.

=== Performance ===
The following list includes the performance of all of Bangladesh's national teams at major competitions.

==== Men's senior team ====
Tournament	Appearance in finals	Last appearance	Best performance
ICC Men's Cricket World Cup	0 out of 13	2023	Quarter-final (2015)
ICC Men's T20 World Cup	0 out of 9	2024	Super 8 (2007, 2024)
ICC Champions Trophy	0 out of 8	2017	Semi-final (2017)
ICC World Test Championship	0 out of 3	2023–25	9th (2019-21, 2021–23)
Asia Cup	3 out of 16	2023	Runners-up (2012, 2016, 2018)
Commonwealth Games	0 out of 1	1998	Group Stage (1998)
Asian Games	1 out of 3	2022	Gold Medal (2010)

==== Women's senior team ====
Tournament	Appearance in finals	Last appearance	Best performance
ICC Women's Cricket World Cup	0 out of 12	2017	7th (2022)
ICC Women's T20 World Cup	0 out of 9	2024	Round 1 (2014, 2016, 2018, 2020, 2023)
Women's Asia Cup	1 out of 9	2024	Champions (2018)
Commonwealth Games	0 out of 1	2022	Group Stage (2022)
Asian Games	2 out of 3	2022	Siver Medal (2010, 2014)

==== Men A team ====
Tournament	Appearance in finals	Last appearance	Best performance
ACC Emerging Teams Asia Cup	1 out of 6	2024	Runner Up (2019)

==== Women's A team ====
Tournament	Finals appearance	Last appearance	Best performance
ACC Women's T20 Emerging Teams Asia Cup	1 out of 1	2023	Runners-up (2023)

==== Men's U-19 team ====
Tournament	Appearance in finals	Last appearance	Best performance
ICC Under-19 Cricket World Cup	1 out of 15	2024	Champions (2020)
ACC Under-19 Asia Cup	3 out of 11	2024	Champions (2023, 2024)

==== Women's U-19 team ====
Tournament	Appearance in finals	Last appearance	Best performance
Under-19 Women's T20 World Cup	0 out of 1	2023	Super 6 (2023)
Under-19 Women's T20 Asia Cup	1 out of 1	2024	Runners-up (2023)

== Organisation of cricket in modern Bangladesh ==
=== International cricket ===
International cricket in Bangladesh generally does not follow a fixed pattern. For example, the English schedule under which the nation tours other countries during the winter and plays at home during the summer. Cricket in Bangladesh is managed by the Bangladesh Cricket Board (BCB).

==== Men's National Team ====
The Bangladesh National Cricket Team represents Bangladesh in international cricket matches.

Bangladesh have been participating in international cricket since 1986 and competed in international tournament since 1999 Cricket World Cup. They have competed in numerous tournaments over the years including the ACC tournaments. The Bangladesh national cricket team has also provided some of the greatest players to the world, the biggest example of which is Shakib Al Hasan. The Bangladesh men's national team is currently ranked No. 9 in Tests, No. 9 in ODIs and at 9th position in T20Is.

- Test International- After becoming a full member of the International Cricket Council (ICC) in 2000, Bangladesh played their first Test match that year against India in Dhaka, becoming the tenth Test cricket playing nation. They also take part in officially sanctioned Asian Test Championship.
- One Day International- Bangladesh played their first ODI International in 1986 against Pakistan. They were not able to participate in first edition of Cricket World Cup. But in late 19s they have reached to ODI world cup consequently and in 2015 Cricket World Cup they reached quarter-finals.
- T20 International- Bangladesh played their first T20 International in 2006 against Zimbabwe. Bangladesh have made great impact in T20 international from their early day of this format. They have been playing ICC Men's T20 World Cup from first Edition, except the 2026 edition because of boycott.

==== Women's National Team ====
Bangladesh has an active women's team which gained One Day International status after finishing 5th at the 2011 Women's Cricket World Cup Qualifier. The women's team also claimed the silver medal at the 2010 Asian Games cricket tournament and won the 2018 Women's Asia Cup.The Bangladesh Women's national team is also currently ranked No. 7 in ODIs and at 9th position in T20Is.

- One Day International- Bangladesh played their first ODI International in 2011 against Ireland. They were not able to participate in first edition of Women's Cricket World Cup. But in latest 2022 edition they have been able to participate.
- T20 International-Bangladesh played their first T20 International in 2012 against Ireland. Bangladesh Women's have made great impact in T20 international from their early day of this format. They have been participating in ICC Women's T20 World Cup from third edition consequently.

=== Domestic Cricket ===
==== Men's Domestic Cricket ====
===== First class competitions =====
- National Cricket League - Soon after the establishment of the BCB, a cricket league commenced in Dhaka and Chittagong at district (regional) level. It became a national tournament in 1974–75. Other tournaments were organised at school, college, youth and university levels.The National Cricket League was founded in the 1999–2000 season ahead of Bangladesh being promoted to full membership of the ICC. It became a first-class competition in 2000–01. It involves eight teams, seven representing administrative divisions and one from the Dhaka Metropolis. There are eight administrative divisions but Mymensingh is not represented. Since the 2015–16 season, the league has been split into two tiers with promotion and relegation. In the 2022–23 tournament, won by Rangpur Division, the structure was as follows:
- Bangladesh Cricket League - A second first-class tournament, the Bangladesh Cricket League, was launched in 2012. This has a similar concept to India's Duleep Trophy as the contestants are zonal teams: Central, South, East and North Zones. The most successful team has been South Zone with five league titles between 2014 and 2020.

===== Limited overs competitions =====
- Dhaka Premier Division Cricket League

===== Twenty20 competitions =====
- Bangladesh Premier League
- Dhaka Premier Division Twenty20 Cricket League

==== Women's Domestic Cricket ====
===== First class competitions =====
- Bangladesh Women's Cricket League

===== Limited overs competitions =====
- Bangladesh Women's National Cricket League

== Stadiums ==
=== Active Stadiums ===
Stadium	City	First-class side(s)	Capacity	First used	Ends	Ref
Sher-e-Bangla National Cricket Stadium	Dhaka	Dhaka Division (2006-present)	26,000	8 December 2006	• AKS End • Shah Cements End	
Bir Shrestho Flight Lieutenant Matiur Rahman Cricket Stadium	Chattogram	Chattogram Division (2005–present)	22,000	26 February 2006	• Walton End • Isphani End	
Sylhet International Cricket Stadium	Sylhet	Sylhet Division (2000–present)	18,500	17 March 2014	• UCB End • Runner End	

== International competitions hosted ==
Competition	Edition	Winner	Final	Runners-up	Bangladesh's position	Venues	Final venue	Stadium
Men's senior competitions
Asia Cup	1988 Asia Cup	India	176 (43.2 overs) – 180/4 (37.1 overs)	Sri Lanka	Group Stage	2 (in 2 cities)	Bangabandhu National Stadium	
ACC Under-19 Asia Cup	1989 Asia Youth Cup	India	224/7 (49 overs) – 145 (39.5 overs)	Sri Lanka	Did not participate	2 (in 2 cities)	Bangabandhu National Stadium	
ICC Champions Trophy	1998 ICC KnockOut Trophy	South Africa	245/10 (49.3 overs) – 248/6 (47 overs)	West Indies	Not eligible	1 (in 1 city)	Bangabandhu National Stadium	
Asia Cup	2000 Asia Cup	Pakistan	277/4 (50 overs) – 238 (45.2 overs)	Sri Lanka	Group Stage	1 (in 1 city)	Bangabandhu National Stadium	
Under-19 Men's Cricket World Cup	2004 Under-19 Cricket World Cup	Pakistan	230/9 (50 overs) – 205 (47.1 overs)	West Indies	Group Stage	1 (in 1 city)	Bangabandhu National Stadium	
ICC Men's Cricket World Cup	2011 Cricket World Cup	India	277/4 (48.2 overs) – 274/6 (50 overs)	Sri Lanka	Group Stage	13 (in 3 countries)	Wankhede Stadium	
Asia Cup	2012 Asia Cup	Pakistan	236/9 (50 overs) – 234/8 (50 overs)	Bangladesh	Runners-up	1 (in 1 city)	Sher-e-Bangla National Cricket Stadium	
Asia Cup	2014 Asia Cup	Sri Lanka	260/5 (50 overs) – 261/5 (46.2 overs)	Pakistan	Group Stage	2 (in 2 cities)	Sher-e-Bangla National Cricket Stadium	
ICC Men's T20 World Cup	2014 World Twenty20	Sri Lanka	130/4 (20 overs) – 134/4 (17.5 overs)	India	Round 2	3 (in 3 cities)	Sher-e-Bangla National Cricket Stadium	
Under-19 Men's Cricket World Cup	2016 Under-19 Cricket World Cup	West Indies	145 (45.1 overs) – 146/5 (49.3 overs)	India	Semi-finals	7 (in 6 cities)	Sher-e-Bangla National Cricket Stadium	
Asia Cup	2016 Asia Cup	India	120/5 (15 overs) – 122/2 (13.5 overs)	Bangladesh	Runners-up	1 (in 1 city)	Sher-e-Bangla National Cricket Stadium	
ACC Emerging Teams Asia Cup	2017 ACC Emerging Teams Asia Cup	Sri Lanka A	133 (42.1 overs) – 134/5 (23.5 overs)	Pakistan A	Semi-finals	3 (in 3 cities)	Zohur Ahmed Chowdhury Stadium	
ACC Under-19 Asia Cup	2018 ACC Under-19 Asia Cup	India	304/3 (50 overs) – 160 (38.4 overs)	Sri Lanka	Semi-finals	4 (in 3 cities)	Sher-e-Bangla National Cricket Stadium	
ACC Emerging Teams Asia Cup	2019 ACC Emerging Teams Asia Cup	Pakistan A	301/6 (50 overs) – 224 (43.3 overs)	Bangladesh A	Runners-up	3 (in 3 cities)	Sher-e-Bangla National Cricket Stadium	
Women's senior competitions
Women's T20 World Cup	2014 Women's World Twenty20	Australia	105/8 (20 overs) – 106/4 (15.1 overs)	England	Group Stage	2 (in 2 cities)	Sher-e-Bangla National Cricket Stadium	
Women's Cricket World Cup Qualifier	2011 Women's Cricket World Cup Qualifier	West Indies	250/5 (50 overs) – 120 (37.3 overs)	Pakistan	Quarter-finals	3 (in 3 cities)	Sher-e-Bangla National Cricket Stadium	
Women's Asia Cup	2022 Women's Twenty20 Asia Cup	India	65/9 (20 overs) – 71/2 (8.3 overs)	Sri Lanka	Group Stage	1 (in 1 city)	Sylhet International Cricket Stadium	

== Performance in international competitions ==
A red box around the year indicates tournaments played within Bangladesh

Key
Champions
Runners-up
Semi-finals

=== Men's team ===
==== ICC World Test Championship ====
ICC World Test Championship records
Years Final Host	Final	Position	GP	W	D	L	PCT%
2019–2021 (England)	DNQ	9th (9)	7	0	1	6	4.8
2021–2023 (England)	DNQ	9th (9)	12	1	1	10	11.0
2023–2025 (England)	DNQ	(9)	12	4	0	8	31.25
2025-2027 (England)	Qualified						
Total	0 Title	3/3	31	5	2	24	–

==== ICC Cricket World Cup ====
ODI World Cup records
Host Years	Round	Position	Mat	W	L	T	NR
(England) 1975	Not eligible (Not an ICC Member)						
(England) 1979	Did not qualify						
(England) (Wales) 1983	Did not qualify						
(India) (Pakistan) 1987	Did not qualify						
(Australia) (New Zealand) 1992	Did not qualify						
(India) (Pakistan) (Sri Lanka) 1996	Did not qualify						
(United Kingdom) (Netherlands) 1999	Group Stage	9th (12)	5	2	3	0	0
(South Africa) (Zimbabwe) (Kenya) 2003	Group Stage	13th (14)	6	0	5	0	1
(Cricket West Indies) 2007	Super 8	7th (16)	9	3	6	0	0
(India) (Sri Lanka) (Bangladesh) 2011	Group Stage	9th (14)	6	3	3	0	0
(Australia) (New Zealand) 2015	Quarter-finals	7th (14)	7	3	3	0	1
(England) (Wales) 2019	Group Stage	8th (10)	9	3	5	0	1
(India) 2023	Group Stage	8th (10)	9	2	7	0	0
(South Africa) (Zimbabwe) (Namibia) 2027	To be determined						
(Bangladesh) (India) 2031	Qualified as co-hosts						
Total	Super 8 (2007); Quarter-finals (2015)	7/15	51	16	32	0	3

==== ICC T20 World Cup ====
T20 World Cup records
Host Years	Round	Position	Mat	W	L	T	NR
(South Africa) 2007	Super 8	8th (12)	5	1	4	0	0
(England) 2009	Group Stage	10th (12)	2	0	2	0	0
(Cricket West Indies) 2010	Group Stage	10th (12)	2	0	2	0	0
(Sri Lanka) 2012	Group Stage	9th (12)	2	0	2	0	0
(Bangladesh) 2014	Second Round	10th (16)	7	2	5	0	0
(India) 2016	Second Round	10th (16)	7	2	4	0	1
(United Arab Emirates) (Oman) 2021	Second Round	11th (16)	8	2	6	0	0
(Australia) 2022	Second Round	9th (16)	5	2	3	0	0
(Cricket West Indies) (United States) 2024	Super 8	7th (20)	7	3	4	0	0
(India) (Sri Lanka) 2026	Qualified						
(Australia) (New Zealand) 2028	To be determined						
(England) (Wales) (Republic of Ireland) (Scotland) 2030	To be determined						
Total	Super 8 (2007, 2024)	9/9	44	12	31	0	1

==== ICC Champions Trophy ====
ICC Champions Trophy record
Host Years	Round	Position	MP	W	L	T	NR
(Bangladesh) 1998	Not eligible						
(Kenya) 2000	Pre-quarter-final	10th (11)	1	0	1	0	0
(Sri Lanka) 2002	Group Stage	11th (12)	2	0	2	0	0
(England) 2004	Group Stage	11th (12)	2	0	2	0	0
(India) 2006	Qualifying Round	9th (12)	3	1	2	0	0
(South Africa) 2009	Did not qualify						
(England) (Wales) 2013	Did not qualify						
(England) (Wales) 2017	Semi-finals	4th (8)	4	1	2	0	1
(Pakistan) (United Arab Emirates) 2025	Qualified						
(India) 2029	To be determined						
Total	Semi-finals (2017)	5/9	12	2	9	0	1

==== Asia Cup ====
Asia Cup record
Year	Round	Position	GP	W	L	T	NR
(United Arab Emirates) 1984	Did not qualify						
(Sri Lanka) 1986	Group Stage	3rd (3)	2	0	2	0	0
(Bangladesh) 1988	Group Stage	3rd (3)	3	0	3	0	0
(India) 1990–91	Group Stage	3rd (3)	2	0	2	0	0
(United Arab Emirates) 1995	Group Stage	4th (4)	3	0	3	0	0
(Sri Lanka) 1997	Group Stage	4th (4)	3	0	3	0	0
(Bangladesh) 2000	Group Stage	4th (4)	3	0	3	0	0
(Sri Lanka) 2004	Super 4	4th (6)	5	1	4	0	0
(Pakistan) 2008	Super 4	4th (6)	5	1	4	0	0
(Sri Lanka) 2010	Group Stage	4th (4)	3	0	3	0	0
(Bangladesh) 2012	Runners up	2nd (4)	4	2	2	0	0
(Bangladesh) 2014	Group Stage	5th (5)	4	0	4	0	0
(Bangladesh) 2016	Runners up	2nd (5)	5	3	2	0	0
(United Arab Emirates) 2018	Runners up	2nd (6)	6	3	3	0	0
(United Arab Emirates) 2022	Group Stage	5th (6)	2	0	2	0	0
(Pakistan) (Sri Lanka) 2023	Super 4	3rd (6)	5	2	3	0	0
(United Arab Emirates) 2025	Qualified						
(Bangladesh) 2027	Qualified as Hosts						
(Pakistan) 2029	Qualified						
(Sri Lanka) 2031	Qualified						
Total	Runners-up (2012, 2016, 2018)	19/20	55	12	43	0	0

==== ICC Trophy/ICC Cricket World Cup Qualifier ====
Known as the 'ICC Trophy' from 1979 to 2005.

Cricket World Cup Qualifier record
Year	Round	Position	MP	W	L	T	NR
(England) 1979	Group stage	8th	4	2	2	0	0
(England) 1982	Semi-finals	4th	7	4	1	0	2
(England) 1986	Group stage	12th	6	2	4	0	0
(Netherlands) 1990	Semi-finals	3rd	7	5	2	0	0
(Kenya) 1994	Second round	5th	7	4	3	0	0
(Malaysia) 1997	Champion	1st	10	9	0	0	1
Total	1 Title	6/6	41	26	13	0	2

==== Commonwealth Games ====
Commonwealth Games records
Year	Round	Position	GP	W	L	T	NR
(Malaysia) 1998	Group stage	14th	3	0	3	0	0
Total	Group Stage	1/1	3	0	3	0	0

==== Asian Games ====
All matches in the 2010 and 2014 seasons were counted as T20s. Since the announcement of T-20 matches between all members having international status from 1 January 2019, all matches from the 2022 season onward are granted as T20Is.

Asian Games record
Year	Round	Position	GP	W	L	T	NR
(China) 2010	Gold medal	1st	3	3	0	0	0
(South Korea) 2014	Bronze medal	3rd	3	2	0	0	1
(China) 2022	Bronze medal	3rd	3	2	1	0	0
(Japan) 2026	TBD						
Total	1 Title	3/3	9	7	1	0	1

==== Defunct tournaments ====
===== Asian Test Championship =====
Asian Test Championship record
Year	Round	Position	GP	W	L	D	NR
(India) (Sri Lanka) (Pakistan) 1998–99	Not eligible						
(Sri Lanka) (Bangladesh) (Pakistan) 2001–02	First round	3rd	2	0	2	0	0
Total	First Round	1/2	2	0	2	0	0

===== Austral-Asia Cup =====
Austral-Asia Cup record
Year	Round	Position	GP	W	L	T	NR
(United Arab Emirates) 1986	Did not participate						
(United Arab Emirates) 1990	First round	6th	2	0	2	0	0
(United Arab Emirates) 1994	Did not participate						
Total	First round	1/3	2	0	2	0	0

===== ACC Trophy =====
ACC Trophy records
Year	Round	Position	GP	W	L	T	NR
(Malaysia) 1996	Champion	1st	7	7	0	0	0
(Nepal) 1998	Champion	1st	6	5	0	0	1
Total	2 Titles	2/2	13	12	0	0	1

=== Women's team ===
==== ICC Women's Cricket World Cup ====
Women's Cricket World Cup records
Host Year	Round	Position	GP	W	L	T	NR
(England) 1973	Did not participate						
(India) 1978	Did not participate						
(New Zealand) 1982	Did not participate						
(Australia) 1988	Did not participate						
(England) 1993	Did not participate						
(India) 1997	Did not participate						
(New Zealand) 2000	Did not participate						
(South Africa) 2005	Did not participate						
(Australia) 2009	Did not participate						
(India) 2013	Did not qualify						
(England) 2017	Did not qualify						
(New Zealand) 2022	Group stage	7/8	7	1	6	0	0
(India) 2025	To be determined						
Total	Group stage	0 Titles	7	1	6	0	0

==== ICC Women's T20 World Cup ====
ICC Women's T20 World Cup records
Host Year	Round	Position	GP	W	L	T	NR
(England) 2009	Did not qualify						
(Cricket West Indies) 2010	Did not qualify						
(Sri Lanka) 2012	Did not qualify						
(Bangladesh) 2014	Group stage	–	5	2	3	0	0
(India) 2016	Group stage	–	4	0	4	0	0
(Cricket West Indies) 2018	Group stage	–	4	0	4	0	0
(Australia) 2020	Group stage	–	4	0	4	0	0
(South Africa) 2023	Group stage	–	4	0	4	0	0
(United Arab Emirates) 2024	Group stage	–	4	1	3	0	0
(England) 2026	To be determined						
(Pakistan) 2026	To be determined						
Total	Group Stage	0 Titles	25	3	22	0	0

==== ICC Women's T20 Champions Trophy ====
ICC Women's T20 Champions Trophy records
Host Year	Round	Position	GP	W	L	T	NR
(Sri Lanka) 2027	To be determined						
2031	To be determined						
Total	–	0 Title	0	0	0	0	0

==== Women's Cricket World Cup Qualifier ====
ICC Women's Cricket World Cup Qualifier records
Host Year	Round	Position	GP	W	L	T	NR
(Netherlands) 2003	Did not participate						
(South Africa) 2008	Did not participate						
(Bangladesh) 2011	Quarter-finals	5/10	5	2	3	0	0
(Sri Lanka) 2017	Super-Six	–	7	3	4	0	0
(Zimbabwe) 2021	Super-Six	–	3	2	1	0	0
2025	To be determined						
Total	3/5	0 Title	15	7	8	0	0

==== ICC Women's World Twenty20 Qualifier ====
ICC Women's World Twenty20 Qualifier records
Host Year	Round	Position	GP	W	L	T	NR
(Republic of Ireland) 2013	Did not participate						
(Thailand) 2015	Runners-up	2/8	5	4	1	0	0
(Netherlands) 2018	Champions	1/8	5	5	0	0	0
(Scotland) 2019	Champions	1/8	5	5	0	0	0
(United Arab Emirates) 2022	Champions	1/8	5	5	0	0	0
(United Arab Emirates) 2024	Did not participate/Qualified as host into the main tournament						
2026	To be determined						
Total	4/6	3 Titles	20	19	1	0	0

==== Women's Asia Cup ====
Asia Cup records
Host Year	Round	Position	GP	W	L	T	NR
(Sri Lanka) 2004	Did not participate						
(Pakistan) 2005–06	Did not participate						
(India) 2006	Did not participate						
(Sri Lanka) 2008	Group stage	4/4	6	1	5	0	0
(China) 2012	Semi-finals	3/8	4	3	1	0	0
(Thailand) 2016	Group stage	4/6	5	2	3	0	0
(Malaysia) 2018	Champions	1/6	6	5	1	0	0
(Bangladesh) 2022	Group stage	5/7	6	2	3	0	1
(Sri Lanka) 2024	Semi-finals	3/8	4	2	2	0	0
Total	Champions (2018)	1 Title	31	15	15	0	1

==== Asian Games ====
Asian Games records
Host Year	Round	Position	GP	W	L	T	NR
(China) 2010	Silver medal	1/8	4	3	1	0	0
(South Korea) 2014	Silver medal	2/10	3	2	1	0	0
(China) 2022	Bronze medal	3/9	3	1	1	0	1
Total	Silver medal	0 Titles	10	6	3	0	1

==== South Asian Games ====
South Asian Games records
Host Year	Round	Position	GP	W	L	T	NR
(Nepal) 2019	Champions	1/4	4	4	0	0	0
(Pakistan) 2025	To be determined						
Total	Champions (2019)	1 Title	4	4	0	0	0

==== Defunct Tournament ====
===== ACC Women's Tournament =====
ACC Women's Tournament records
Host Year	Round	Position	GP	W	L	T	NR
(Malaysia) 2007	Champions	1/8	5	5	0	0	0
Total	Champions (2007)	1 Title	5	5	0	0	0

=== Men's U-19 team ===
==== U-19 World Cup ====
Bangladesh U19 Cricket World Cup record
Year	Result	Pos	№	Pld	W	L	T	NR
(Australia) 1988	Part of ICC Associates XI							
(South Africa) 1998	Group stage	9th	16	7	6	1	0	0
(Sri Lanka) 2000	Group stage	10th	16	8	5	2	0	1
(New Zealand) 2002	Group stage	11th	16	7	3	3	1	0
(Bangladesh) 2004	Group stage	9th	16	8	6	2	0	0
(Sri Lanka) 2006	Quarter Finals	5th	16	6	5	1	0	0
(Malaysia) 2008	Quarter Finals	7th	16	5	3	1	0	0
(New Zealand) 2010	Group stage	9th	16	6	4	2	0	0
(Australia) 2012	Quarter Finals	7th	16	6	3	3	0	0
(United Arab Emirates) 2014	Group stage	9th	16	6	5	1	0	0
(Bangladesh) 2016	Semi Finals	3rd	16	6	5	1	0	0
(New Zealand) 2018	Quarter Finals	6th	16	6	3	3	0	0
(South Africa) 2020	Champions	1st	16	6	5	0	0	1
(Cricket West Indies) 2022	Quarter Finals	8th	16	6	2	4	0	0
(South Africa) 2024	Super Sixes	7th	16	5	3	2	0	0
(Zimbabwe) (Namibia) 2026	To be determined							
Total	1 Title			87	59	26	1	2

==== U-19 Asia Cup ====
Bangladesh U19 Asia Cup record
Year	Result	Pos	№	Pld	W	L	T	NR
(Bangladesh) 1989	Did not participate							
(Pakistan) 2003	Group stage	4th	4	3	0	3	0	0
(Malaysia) 2012	Group stage	5th	8	3	1	2	0	0
(United Arab Emirates) 2014	Group stage	5th	8	3	1	2	0	0
(Sri Lanka) 2016	Semi Finals	3rd	8	4	3	1	0	0
(Malaysia) 2017	Semi Finals	3rd	8	4	3	1	0	0
(Bangladesh) 2018	Semi Finals	3rd	8	4	2	2	0	0
(Sri Lanka) 2019	Runners up	2nd	8	5	3	1	0	1
(United Arab Emirates) 2021	Semi Finals	3rd	8	4	2	1	0	1
(United Arab Emirates) 2023	Champions	1st	8	5	5	0	0	0
(United Arab Emirates) 2024	Champions	1st	8	5	4	1	0	0
Total	2 Titles			40	24	14	0	2

=== Women's U-19 team ===
==== Under-19 Women's World Cup ====
Bangladesh U19 Cricket World Cup record
Year	Result	Pos	№	Pld	W	L	T	NR
(South Africa) 2023	Playoff round	5th	16	5	4	1	0	0
(Malaysia) (Thailand) 2025	To be determined							
(Bangladesh) (Nepal) 2027	Qualified as hosts							
Total	Second Round	–	–	5	4	1	0	0

==== Under-19 Women's Asia Cup ====
Bangladesh U19 Cricket World Cup record
Year	Result	Pos	№	Pld	W	L	T	NR
(Malaysia) 2024	Runners-up	2nd	6	5	3	2	0	0
Total	Runners-up	–	–	5	3	2	0	0

=== Men's A team ===
==== ACC Emerging Teams Asia Cup ====
ACC Emerging Teams Asia Cup record
Year	Round	Position	P	W	L	T	NR
(Singapore) 2013	Group Stage	6/8	3	1	2	0	0
(Bangladesh) 2017	Semi-finals	3/8	4	2	1	1	0
(Sri Lanka) (Pakistan) 2018	Semi-finals	4/8	4	2	2	0	0
(Bangladesh) 2019	Runners-up	2/8	5	4	1	0	0
(Sri Lanka) 2023	Semi-finals	4/8	4	2	2	0	0
(Oman) 2024	Group Stage	5/8	3	1	2	0	0
Total	0 Title	-	23	12	10	1	0

=== Women's A team ===
==== ACC Women's T20 Emerging Teams Asia Cup ====
ACC Women's T20 Emerging Teams Asia Cup record
Year	Round	Position	P	W	L	T	NR
(Hong Kong) 2023	Runners-up	2/8	5	2	1	0	2
Total	0 Title	-	5	2	1	0	2

== In Bangladeshi culture ==
Cricket holds a significant position in the culture of Bangladesh. Matches are played before large audiences both at grounds and on TV and other media.

== See also ==
- Sport in Bangladesh
- Cricket in South Asia
- List of cricket records
- List of Bangladesh national cricket captains
- List of Bangladesh Test cricketers
- List of Bangladesh ODI cricketers
- List of Bangladesh Twenty20 International cricketers
- List of National Sports Award recipients in cricket
