= 2026 Asia Cup Rising Stars =

Cricket tournament

- Dates: 19 – 29 November 2026
- Administrator: Asian Cricket Council
- Cricket format: List A One Day International
- Tournament format(s): Group round-robin and knockout
- Host: Qatar
- Participants: 8
- Matches: 15

The 2026 Asia Cup Rising Stars (also known as DP World Asia Cup Rising Stars for sponsorship reasons) will be the second edition of the Asia Cup Rising Stars that scheduled to be played in November 2026 in Qatar. Eight teams will compete in the tournament, including 'A' teams from India, Pakistan, Sri Lanka, Afghanistan and Bangladesh, as well as three qualifiers from the 2026 ACC Men's Premier Cup.

Pakistan Shaheens are the defending champions having won the previous editions.

== Teams ==
The participating teams are placed in the following groups.

Group A	Group B
Afghanistan A; Bangladesh A; Hong Kong; Sri Lanka A	India A; Nepal; Pakistan Shaheens; United Arab Emirates

== Squads ==
Afghanistan A	Bangladesh A	Hong Kong	India A
Ikram Alikhil (c, wk); Bashir Ahmad; Qais Ahmad; Ijaz Ahmad Ahmadzai; Hassan Eisakhil; Allah Ghazanfar; Naseer Maroofkhil; Imran Mir; Mohammad Ishaq (wk); Darwish Rasooli; Farmanullah Safi; Bilal Sami; Bahir Shah; Faisal Shinozada; Naveed Zadran	Saif Hassan (c); Parvez Hossain Emon; Iftakhar Hossain Ifti; Shahadat Hossain; Yasir Ali; Sabbir Rahman; Afif Hossain; Irfan Shukkur (wk); Samiun Basir; Rakibul Hasan; Mohammad Rubel; Chowdhury Md Rizwan; Iqbal Hossain Emon; Ripon Mondol; Mohammad Saifuddin	Yasim Murtaza (c); Babar Hayat (vc); Zeeshan Ali (wk); Mohammad Ghazanfar; Ateeq Iqbal; Aizaz Khan; Ehsan Khan; Hafeez Khan; Hassan Khan; Nasrulla Rana; Anshuman Rath; Abdul Samad; Reyansh Sharma; Ayush Shukla; Shahid Wasif	Tilak Varma (c); Rinku Singh (vc); ~~Rajat Patidar (vc)~~ (Note: Rajat Patidar was ruled out of the tournament due to injury and was replaced by Ayush Badoni.); Shahbaz Ahmed; Ayush Badoni; Harsh Dubey; Arshad Khan; Tanush Kotian; Kumar Kushagra (wk); Vipraj Nigam; Harshit Rana; Abhishek Sharma; Suryansh Shedge; Prabhsimran Singh (wk); Vaibhav Sooryavanshi; Prince Yadav
Nepal	Pakistan Shaheens	Sri Lanka A	United Arab Emirates
Sandeep Lamichhane (c); Basir Ahamad; Lokesh Bam (wk); Kushal Bhurtel; Deepak Dumre (wk); Abhishesh Gautam; Pratish GC (Note: Sompal Kami was ruled out of the tournament due to injury and was replaced by Pratish GC.); Sundeep Jora; ~~Sompal Kami~~; Dev Khanal; Rashid Khan; Arjun Kumal (wk); Ishan Pandey; Lalit Rajbanshi; Pawan Sarraf; Mayan Yadav (Note: Mayan Yadav, who was initially named as a travelling reserve in Nepal's squad, was later included in the main squad.); Nandan Yadav	Abdul Samad (c); Rohail Nazir (vc, wk); Haider Ali; Danish Aziz; Ahmed Daniyal; Mohammad Hasnain; Shamyl Hussain; Akif Javed; Shahzaib Khan; Saad Masood; Sufyan Moqim; Hassan Nawaz; Imran Randhawa; Maaz Sadaqat; Farhan Yousaf	Pavan Rathnayake (c); Lasith Croospulle; Nipun Dhananjaya; Ravindu Fernando; Chamika Heenatigala; Sineth Jayawardena; Janith Liyanage; Nishan Madushka (wk); Duvindu Ranatunga; Wanuja Sahan; Lahiru Samarakoon; Dulaj Samuditha; Garuka Sanketh; Sharujan Shanmuganathan (wk); Vijayakanth Viyaskanth	Basil Hameed (c); Ibrar Ahmad; Zahid Ali; Aftab Alam (wk); Noorullah Ayobi; Harpreet Singh Bhatia; Ethan D'Souza; Ayaan Misbah; Muhammad Mohsin; Omid Shafi Rahman; Muhammad Shahdad; Aryansh Sharma (wk); Awais Ali Shah; Uddish Suri; Ansh Tandon

Afghanistan A named Izharulhaq Naveed, Khalid Taniwal and Abdullah Tarakhail as reserves.

== Group stage ==
=== Group A ===
==== Points table ====
Pos	Team	Pld	W	L	NR	Pts	NRR	Qualification
1	Sri Lanka A	2	2	0	0	4	1.982	Advanced to the semi-finals
2	Bangladesh A	2	2	0	0	4	0.630	Advanced to the semi-finals
3	Hong Kong	2	0	2	0	0	−0.748	Eliminated
4	Afghanistan A	2	0	2	0	0	−1.611	Eliminated

Updated to match(es) played on 21 November 2026. Source: Cricinfo

==== Fixtures ====
Match 1
19 November 2026
09:00
Scorecard

Hong Kong; 219/8 (50 overs)	v	Bangladesh A 220/2 (41 overs)
Anshuman Rath 77 (87); Iqbal Hossain Emon 3/33 (9 overs)		Saif Hassan 86* (116); Ayush Shukla 1/41 (9 overs)

Bangladesh A won by 8 wickets
UDST Cricket Ground, Doha
Umpires: K. N. Ananthapadmanabhan (Ind) and Mahmood Kharoti (Afg)
Player of the match: Saif Hassan (Bangladesh A)

- Bangladesh A won the toss and elected to field.
- Abdul Samad and Reyansh Sharma (HK) both made their List A debuts.

Match 2
19 November 2026
13:00 (D/N)
Scorecard

Afghanistan A 139 (35.3 overs)	v	Sri Lanka A 144/4 (21.4 overs)
Darwish Rasooli 80 (89); Chamika Heenatigala 3/11 (3 overs)		Lasith Croospulle 40 (48); Naveed Zadran 2/45 (6.4 overs)

Sri Lanka A won by 6 wickets
West End Park International Cricket Stadium, Doha
Umpires: Morshed Ali Khan (Ban) and Tariq Rasheed (Pak)
Player of the match: Chamika Heenatigala (Sri Lanka A)

- Sri Lanka A won the toss and elected to field.

Match 5
21 November 2026
09:00
Scorecard

Sri Lanka A 284/9 (50 overs)	v	Hong Kong; 260/9 (50 overs)
Lasith Croospulle 75 (70); Aizaz Khan 3/61 (9 overs)		Babar Hayat 86 (114); Dulaj Samuditha 3/33 (7 overs)

Sri Lanka A won by 24 runs
UDST Cricket Ground, Doha
Umpires: Nadeem Anjum (UAE) and Mahmood Kharoti (Afg)
Player of the match: Lasith Croospulle (Sri Lanka A)

- Sri Lanka A won the toss and elected to bat.

Match 6
21 November 2026
13:00 (D/N)
Scorecard

Afghanistan A 174 (45 overs)	v	Bangladesh A 176/9 (45.5 overs)
Ikram Alikhil 48 (94); Ripon Mondol 3/39 (8 overs)		Parvez Hossain Emon 33 (27); Naveed Zadran 3/27 (10 overs)

Bangladesh A won by 1 wicket
West End Park International Cricket Stadium, Doha
Umpires: Chamara de Zoysa (SL) and Tariq Rasheed (Pak)
Player of the match: Iqbal Hossain Emon (Bangladesh A)

- Bangladesh A won the toss and elected to field.

23 November 2026
09:00
Scorecard

Afghanistan A	v	Hong Kong

UDST Cricket Ground, Doha

23 November 2026
13:00 (D/N)
Scorecard

Bangladesh A	v	Sri Lanka A

West End Park International Cricket Stadium, Doha

=== Group B ===
==== Points table ====
Pos	Team	Pld	W	L	NR	Pts	NRR
1	Pakistan Shaheens	2	2	0	0	4	1.090
2	India A	2	1	1	0	2	2.580
3	Nepal	2	1	1	0	2	−2.461
4	United Arab Emirates	2	0	2	0	0	−2.061

Updated to match(es) played on 22 November 2026. Source: Cricinfo

==== Fixtures ====
Match 3
20 November 2026
09:00
Scorecard

Pakistan Shaheens; 245 (46.4 overs)	v	United Arab Emirates; 184 (40.5 overs)
Shamyl Hussain 62 (39); Basil Hameed 4/37 (10 overs)		Muhammad Shahdad 45 (60); Sufyan Moqim 3/35 (10 overs)

Pakistan Shaheens won by 61 runs
UDST Cricket Ground, Doha
Umpires: Chamara de Zoysa (SL) and Kamlesh Thakur (Nep)
Player of the match: Shamyl Hussain (Pakistan Shaheens)

- United Arab Emirates won the toss and elected to field.

Match 4
20 November 2026
13:00 (D/N)
Scorecard

India A 332/9 (50 overs)	v	Nepal; 26 (11.3 overs)
Kumar Kushagra 117 (102); Lalit Rajbanshi 3/61 (10 overs); Sandeep Lamichhane 3/61 (10 overs)		Rashid Khan 6 (14); Prince Yadav 5/6 (5 overs)

India A won by 306 runs
West End Park International Cricket Stadium, Doha
Umpires: Morshed Ali Khan (Ban) and Tabarak Dar (HK)
Player of the match: Kumar Kushagra (India A)

- Nepal won the toss and elected to field.
- Lokesh Bam, Deepak Dumre and Rashid Khan (Nep) all made their List A debuts.

'Match 7
22 November 2026
09:00
Scorecard

United Arab Emirates; 121 (39.5 overs)	v	Nepal; 123/4 (22 overs)
Muhammad Shahdad 40 (70); Sandeep Lamichhane 3/11 (10 overs)		Kushal Bhurtel 57 (56); Muhammad Mohsin 2/28 (4 overs)

Nepal won by 6 wickets
UDST Cricket Ground, Doha
Umpires: Tabarak Dar (HK) and K. N. Ananthapadmanabhan (Ind)
Player of the match: Sandeep Lamichhane (Nep)

- Nepal won the toss and elected to field.
- Lokesh Bam, Rashid Khan, Mayan Yadav (Nep), Aftab Alam, Noorullah Ayobi and Uddish Suri (UAE) all made their ODI debuts.
- This was the first men's ODI to be played at the venue.

Match 8
22 November 2026
13:00 (D/N)
Scorecard

Pakistan Shaheens; 313 (49.2 overs)	v	India A 265 (49.1 overs)
Hassan Nawaz 79 (82); Vipraj Nigam 2/46 (8 overs)		Tilak Varma 100 (149); Hassan Nawaz 3/45 (10 overs)

Pakistan Shaheens won by 48 runs
West End Park International Cricket Stadium, Doha
Umpires: Morshed Ali Khan (Ban) and Chamara de Zoysa (SL)
Player of the match: Hassan Nawaz (Pakistan Shaheens)

- Pakistan Shaheens won the toss and elected to bat.

24 November 2026
09:00
Scorecard

India A	v	United Arab Emirates

West End Park International Cricket Stadium, Doha

24 November 2026
13:00 (D/N)
Scorecard

Nepal	v	Pakistan Shaheens

UDST Cricket Ground, Doha

== Knockout stage ==
=== Bracket ===
Semi-finals
A1
B2
B1
A2

Final
SF1
SF2

=== Semi-finals ===
==== 1st semi-final ====
26 November 2026
13:00 (D/N)
Scorecard

Winner of Group A	v	Runner-up of Group B

West End Park International Cricket Stadium, Doha

==== 2nd semi-final ====
27 November 2026
13:00 (D/N)
Scorecard

Winner of Group B	v	Runner-up of Group A

West End Park International Cricket Stadium, Doha

=== Final ===
29 November 2025
13:00 (D/N)
Scorecard

Winner of semi-final 1	v	Winner of semi-final 2

West End Park International Cricket Stadium, Doha
