= 2025 Asia Cup Rising Stars =

Cricket tournament

- Tournament logo
- Dates: 14 – 23 November 2025
- Administrator: Asian Cricket Council
- Cricket format: Twenty20, Twenty20 International
- Tournament format(s): Group round-robin and knockout
- Host: Qatar
- Champions: Pakistan Shaheens
- Runners-up: Bangladesh A
- Participants: 8
- Matches: 15
- Player of the series: Maaz Sadaqat
- Most runs: Maaz Sadaqat (258)
- Most wickets: Ripon Mondol (11)

The 2025 Asia Cup Rising Stars (also known as DP World Asia Cup Rising Stars for sponsorship reasons) was the inaugural edition of the Asia Cup Rising Stars that was played in November 2025 in Qatar. Eight teams competed in the tournament, including 'A' teams, i.e. the reserve squads from India, Pakistan, Sri Lanka, Afghanistan, and Bangladesh, as well as three qualifiers from the 2024 ACC Men's Premier Cup. The tournament was organised by the Asian Cricket Council (ACC).

== Teams ==
The participating teams were placed in the following groups.

Group A	Group B
Afghanistan A; Bangladesh A; Hong Kong; Sri Lanka A	India A; Oman; Pakistan Shaheens; United Arab Emirates

== Squads ==
Afghanistan A	Bangladesh A	Hong Kong	India A
Darwish Rasooli (c); Sediqullah Atal (vc); Qais Ahmad; Ijaz Ahmad Ahmadzai; Abdollah Ahmadzai; Zubaid Akbari; Faridoon Dawoodzai; Farmanullah; Allah Mohammad Ghazanfar; Mohammad Ishaq (wk); Nangeyalia Kharote; Imran Mir; Noor Rahman (wk); Bilal Sami; Rahmanullah Zadran	Akbar Ali (c, wk); Zawad Abrar (wk); Abu Hider; Tofael Ahmed; Jishan Alam; Yasir Ali; Mahidul Islam Ankon (wk); Ariful Islam; Mrittunjoy Chowdhury; Shadhin Islam; SM Meherob; Ripon Mondol; Rakibul Hasan; Abdul Gaffar Saqlain; Habibur Rahman Sohan	Yasim Murtaza (c); Babar Hayat (vc); Zeeshan Ali (wk); Kalhan Challu; Mohammad Ghazanfar; Ateeq Iqbal; Aizaz Khan; Ehsan Khan; Nizakat Khan; Shiv Mathur; Hassan Khan Mohammad; Nasrulla Rana; Anshuman Rath; Kinchit Shah; Mohammad Waheed	Jitesh Sharma (c, wk); Naman Dhir (vc); Priyansh Arya; Harsh Dubey; Abhishek Porel (wk); Ashutosh Sharma; Suyash Sharma; Suryansh Shedge; Ramandeep Singh; Vaibhav Sooryavanshi; Gurjapneet Singh; Yudhvir Singh; Yash Thakur; Vijaykumar Vyshak; Nehal Wadhera
Oman	Pakistan Shaheens	Sri Lanka A	United Arab Emirates
Hammad Mirza (c); Wasim Ali; Shuaib Al Balushi; Aryan Bisht; Zikria Islam; Shafiq Jan; Pruthvikumar Machhi; Obaidullah; Jay Odedra; Muzahir Raza; Narayan Saishiv; Hassnain Shah; Samay Shrivastava; Mohammed Yousuf; Sufyan Yousaf (wk)	Irfan Khan Niazi (c); Shahid Aziz; Ahmed Daniyal; Mohammad Faiq; Ghazi Ghori (wk); Mubasir Khan; Yasir Khan; Saad Masood; Arafat Minhas; Salman Mirza; Sufiyan Muqeem; Mohammad Naeem; Maaz Sadaqat; Ubaid Shah; Muhammad Shahzad	Dunith Wellalage (c); Sahan Arachchige; Lasith Croospulle; Sohan de Livera; Nuwanidu Fernando; Vishen Halambage; Pramod Madushan; Nishan Madushka (wk); Traveen Mathew; Ramesh Mendis; Milan Rathnayake; Garuka Sanketh; Vijayakanth Viyaskanth; Ahan Wickramasinghe; Isitha Wijesundara	Alishan Sharafu (c); Zahid Ali; Muhammad Arfan; Ethan D'Souza; Mohammed Faraazuddin; Muhammad Farooq; Syed Haider (wk); Muhammad Jawadullah; Harshit Kaushik; Sohaib Khan; Mayank Kumar; Aayan Afzal Khan; Yayin Kiran Rai; Muhammad Rohid; Ahmed Tariq

Afghanistan also named Yama Arab, Sediqullah Pacha and Wafiullah Tarakhil as reserve players.

== Preparations ==
=== Afghanistan in Qatar ===
The Afghan squad played a 3-match series against Qatar, the last of which had official T20I status.

=== Hong Kong in Qatar ===
Hong Kong men's cricket team in Qatar in 2025–26
	Qatar	Hong Kong
- Dates: 12 November 2025 – 13 November 2025
Captains	Mirza Mohammed Baig	Yasim Murtaza

Twenty20 International series
- Results: 2-match series drawn 1–1
Most runs	Mohammad Ahnaff (48)	Shiv Mathur (37)
Most wickets	Saqlain Arshad (4); Muhammad Asim (4)	Ateeq Iqbal (4)
- Player of the series: Muhammad Asim (Qat)

Hong Kong played two T20Is against Qatar before the tournament.

==== T20I series ====
===== 1st T20I =====
12 November 2025
17:30 (D/N)
Scorecard

Qatar; 109 (19.3 overs)	v	Hong Kong; 103/9 (20 overs)
Imal Liyanage 28 (23); Ateeq Iqbal 3/8 (2.3 overs)		Yasim Murtaza 20 (21); Mirza Mohammed Baig 3/8 (3 overs)

Qatar won by 6 runs
West End Park International Cricket Stadium, Doha
Umpires: Asghar Ali Bhatti (Qat) and Tahir Mehmood (Qat)
Player of the match: Mirza Mohammed Baig (Qat)

- Qatar won the toss and elected to bat.
- Mokbul Ahammed (Qat) made his T20I debut.

===== 2nd T20I =====
13 November 2025
13:00
Scorecard

Hong Kong; 131/9 (20 overs)	v	Qatar; 122/7 (20 overs)
Anshuman Rath 31 (36); Muhammad Asim 3/26 (4 overs)		Mohammad Ahnaff 48* (40); Ehsan Khan 2/26 (4 overs)

Hong Kong won by 9 runs
UDST Cricket Ground, Doha
Umpires: Abdul Jabbar (Qat) and Asghar Ali Bhatti (Qat)
Player of the match: Zeeshan Ali (HK)

- Qatar won the toss and elected to field.

== Group stage ==
The fixtures were announced by ACC on 31 October 2025.

=== Group A ===
==== Points table ====
Pos	Team	Pld	W	L	NR	Pts	NRR	Qualification
1	Bangladesh A	3	2	1	0	4	2.323	Advanced to the semi-finals
2	Sri Lanka A	3	2	1	0	4	0.970	Advanced to the semi-finals
3	Afghanistan A	3	2	1	0	4	−0.321	
4	Hong Kong	3	0	3	0	0	−2.947	

Source: ESPNcricinfo

==== Fixtures ====
15 November 2025
09:30
Scorecard

Hong Kong; 167/8 (20 overs)	v	Bangladesh A 171/2 (11 overs)
Babar Hayat 63 (49); Ripon Mondol 2/24 (4 overs)		Habibur Rahman Sohan 100* (35); Ehsan Khan 2/33 (3 overs)

Bangladesh A won by 8 wickets
West End Park International Cricket Stadium, Doha
Umpires: Akbar Ali (UAE) and Virender Sharma (Ind)
Player of the match: Habibur Rahman Sohan (Bangladesh A)

- Bangladesh A won the toss and elected to field.

15 November 2025
14:30
Scorecard

Sri Lanka A 170/9 (20 overs)	v	Afghanistan A 171/7 (19.5 overs)
Milan Rathnayake 41 (19); Bilal Sami 4/45 (4 overs)		Sediqullah Atal 54 (27); Vijayakanth Viyaskanth 3/28 (4 overs)

Afghanistan A won by 3 wickets
West End Park International Cricket Stadium, Doha
Umpires: Zulfiqar Jan (Pak) and Morshed Ali Khan (Ban)
Player of the match: Bilal Sami (Afghanistan A)

- Sri Lanka A won the toss and elected to bat.

17 November 2025
12:30
Scorecard

Hong Kong; 117/9 (20 overs)	v	Sri Lanka A 120/3 (13.5 overs)
Shiv Mathur 26 (23); Traveen Mathew 3/21 (4 overs)		Nuwanidu Fernando 47* (27); Anshuman Rath 1/14 (2 overs)

Sri Lanka A won by 7 wickets
West End Park International Cricket Stadium, Doha
Umpires: Akbar Ali (UAE) and Morshed Ali Khan (Ban)
Player of the match: Traveen Mathew (Sri Lanka A)

- Sri Lanka A won the toss and elected to field.

17 November 2025
17:30 (D/N)
Scorecard

Afghanistan A 78 (18.4 overs)	v	Bangladesh A 79/2 (13.3 overs)
Darwish Rasooli 27 (28); Rakibul Hasan 3/7 (4 overs)		Mahidul Islam Ankon 27 (30); Allah Mohammad Ghazanfar 2/8 (4 overs)

Bangladesh A won by 8 wickets
West End Park International Cricket Stadium, Doha
Umpires: Hemantha Boteju (SL) and Virender Sharma (Ind)
Player of the match: Ripon Mondol (Bangladesh A)

- Bangladesh A won the toss and elected to field.

19 November 2025
12:30
Scorecard

Afghanistan A 140/6 (20 overs)	v	Hong Kong; 116/9 (20 overs)
Mohammad Ishaq 38 (29); Hassan Khan Mohammad 3/30 (4 overs)		Babar Hayat 30 (26); Qais Ahmad 3/18 (3 overs)

Afghanistan A won by 24 runs
West End Park International Cricket Stadium, Doha
Umpires: Rahul Asher (Oma) and Zulfiqar Jan (Pak)
Player of the match: Qais Ahmad (Afghanistan A)

- Hong Kong won the toss and elected to field.

19 November 2025
17:30 (D/N)
Scorecard

Sri Lanka A 159/7 (20 overs)	v	Bangladesh A 153/6 (20 overs)
Sahan Arachchige 69 (49); Abu Hider 2/37 (4 overs)		Habibur Rahman Sohan 27 (14); Dunith Wellalage 3/19 (4 overs)

Sri Lanka A won by 6 runs
West End Park International Cricket Stadium, Doha
Umpires: Zulfiqar Jan (Pak) and Mahmood Kharoti (Afg)
Player of the match: Dunith Wellalage (Sri Lanka A)

- Bangladesh A won the toss and elected to field.

=== Group B ===
==== Points table ====
Pos	Team	Pld	W	L	NR	Pts	NRR	Qualification
1	Pakistan Shaheens	3	3	0	0	6	4.560	Advanced to the semi-finals
2	India A	3	2	1	0	4	1.979	Advanced to the semi-finals
3	Oman	3	1	2	0	2	−1.020	
4	United Arab Emirates	3	0	3	0	0	−5.283	

Source: ESPNcricinfo

==== Fixtures ====
14 November 2025
09:30
Scorecard

Pakistan Shaheens; 220/4 (20 overs)	v	Oman; 180/9 (20 overs)
Maaz Sadaqat 96* (54); Jay Odedra 1/29 (2 overs)		Zikria Islam 57 (28); Ubaid Shah 3/29 (3 overs)

Pakistan Shaheens won by 40 runs
West End Park International Cricket Stadium, Doha
Umpires: Hemantha Boteju (SL) and Morshed Ali Khan (Ban)
Player of the match: Maaz Sadaqat (Pakistan Shaheens)

- Oman won the toss and elected to field.
- Shafiq Jan, Narayan Saishiv and Sufyan Yousaf (Oma) all made their T20 debuts.

14 November 2025
14:30
Scorecard

India A 297/4 (20 overs)	v	United Arab Emirates; 149/7 (20 overs)
Vaibhav Sooryavanshi 144 (42); Aayan Afzal Khan 1/42 (3 overs)		Sohaib Khan 63 (41); Gurjapneet Singh 3/18 (4 overs)

India A won by 148 runs
West End Park International Cricket Stadium, Doha
Umpires: Rahul Asher (Oma) and Mahmood Kharoti (Afg)
Player of the match: Vaibhav Sooryavanshi (India A)

- India A won the toss and elected to bat.
- Sohaib Khan and Ahmed Tariq (UAE) both made their T20 debuts.

16 November 2025
12:30
Scorecard

United Arab Emirates; 154/6 (20 overs)	v	Oman; 155/8 (20 overs)
Syed Haider 45 (30); Wasim Ali 2/20 (4 overs)		Narayan Saishiv 31 (31); Muhammad Rohid 3/31 (4 overs)

Oman won by 2 wickets
West End Park International Cricket Stadium, Doha
Umpires: Virender Sharma (Ind) and Ramasamy Venkatesh (HK)
Player of the match: Wasim Ali (Oma)

- United Arab Emirates won the toss and elected to bat.
- Shafiq Jan, Narayan Saishiv, Sufyan Yousaf (Oma), Sohaib Khan and Yayin Kiran Rai (UAE) all made their T20I debuts.

16 November 2025
17:30 (D/N)
Scorecard

India A 136 (19 overs)	v	Pakistan Shaheens; 137/2 (13.2 overs)
Vaibhav Sooryavanshi 45 (28); Shahid Aziz 3/24 (3 overs)		Maaz Sadaqat 79* (47); Suyash Sharma 1/31 (4 overs)

Pakistan Shaheens won by 8 wickets
West End Park International Cricket Stadium, Doha
Umpires: Hemantha Boteju (SL) and Mahmood Kharoti (Afg)
Player of the match: Maaz Sadaqat (Pakistan Shaheens)

- Pakistan Shaheens won the toss and elected to field.

18 November 2025
12:30
Scorecard

United Arab Emirates; 59 (18 overs)	v	Pakistan Shaheens; 61/1 (5.2 overs)
Syed Haider 20 (19); Sufiyan Muqeem 3/12 (4 overs)		Maaz Sadaqat 37* (15); Muhammad Rohid 1/25 (3 overs)

Pakistan Shaheens won by 9 wickets
West End Park International Cricket Stadium, Doha
Umpires: Rahul Asher (Oma) and Ramasamy Venkatesh (HK)
Player of the match: Maaz Sadaqat (Pakistan Shaheens)

- United Arab Emirates won the toss and elected to bat.

18 November 2025
17:30 (D/N)
Scorecard

Oman; 135/7 (20 overs)	v	India A 138/4 (17.5 overs)
Wasim Ali 54* (45); Suyash Sharma 2/12 (4 overs)		Harsh Dubey 53* (44); Jay Odedra 1/18 (4 overs)

India A won by 6 wickets
West End Park International Cricket Stadium, Doha
Umpires: Akbar Ali (UAE) and Mahmood Kharoti (Afg)
Player of the match: Harsh Dubey (India A)

- India A won the toss and elected to field.

== Knockout stage ==
=== Bracket ===
Semi-finals
A1	Bangladesh A	194/6 (20 overs) & 1/1
B2	India A	194/6 (20 overs) & 0/2
B1	Pakistan Shaheens	153/9 (20 overs)
A2	Sri Lanka A	148/9 (20 overs)

Final
B1	Pakistan Shaheens	125 (20 overs) & 7/0
A1	Bangladesh A	125/9 (20 overs) & 6/2

=== Semi-finals ===
==== 1st semi-final ====
21 November 2025
12:30
Scorecard

Bangladesh A 194/6 (20 overs)	v	India A 194/6 (20 overs)
Habibur Rahman Sohan 65 (46); Gurjapneet Singh 2/39 (4 overs)		Priyansh Arya 44 (23); Rakibul Hasan 2/39 (4 overs)

Match tied
(Bangladesh A won the Super Over)
West End Park International Cricket Stadium, Doha
Umpires: Hemantha Boteju (SL) and Mahmood Kharoti (Afg)
Player of the match: Ripon Mondol (Bangladesh A)

- India A won the toss and elected to field.
- Super Over: India A 0/2, Bangladesh A 1/1.

==== 2nd semi-final ====
21 November 2025
17:30 (D/N)
Scorecard

Pakistan Shaheens; 153/9 (20 overs)	v	Sri Lanka A 148/9 (20 overs)
Ghazi Ghori 39* (36); Pramod Madushan 4/29 (4 overs)		Milan Rathnayake 40 (32); Sufiyan Muqeem 3/12 (4 overs)

Pakistan Shaheens won by 5 runs
West End Park International Cricket Stadium, Doha
Umpires: Morshed Ali Khan (Ban) and Mahmood Kharoti (Afg)
Player of the match: Saad Masood (Pakistan Shaheens)

- Sri Lanka A won the toss and elected to field.

=== Final ===
23 November 2025
17:30 (D/N)
Scorecard

Pakistan Shaheens; 125 (20 overs)	v	Bangladesh A 125/9 (20 overs)
Saad Masood 38 (26); Ripon Mondol 3/25 (4 overs)		Habibur Rahman Sohan 26 (17); Sufiyan Muqeem 3/11 (4 overs)

Match tied
(Pakistan Shaheens won the Super Over)
West End Park International Cricket Stadium, Doha
Umpires: Hemantha Boteju (SL) and Mahmood Kharoti (Afg)
Player of the match: Ahmed Daniyal (Pakistan Shaheens)

- Bangladesh A won the toss and elected to field.
- Super Over: Bangladesh A 6/2, Pakistan Shaheens 7/0.

== Broadcasting ==
Country or region	Television broadcaster	Online streaming
Bangladesh	T Sports	
Canada; United States	Willow	
India	Sony Sports Network	SonyLIV
Pakistan	PTV Sports	
Sri Lanka	Sony Sports Network; TV 1	
