= 2024 ACC Emerging Teams Asia Cup =

Cricket tournament

- Dates: 18 – 27 October 2024
- Administrator: Asian Cricket Council
- Cricket format: Twenty20
- Tournament format(s): Group round-robin and knockout
- Host: Oman
- Champions: Afghanistan A (1st title)
- Runners-up: Sri Lanka A
- Participants: 8
- Matches: 15
- Player of the series: (Afghanistan) Sediqullah Atal
- Most runs: (Afghanistan) Sediqullah Atal (368)
- Most wickets: (Sri Lanka) Dushan Hemantha (15)

The 2024 ACC Emerging Teams Asia Cup was the sixth edition of the ACC Emerging Teams Asia Cup that was played in October 2024 in Muscat, Oman. Eight teams competed in the tournament, including 'A' teams i.e. the reserve squads from India, Pakistan, Sri Lanka, Afghanistan, Bangladesh as well as 3 qualifiers from the 2024 ACC Men's Premier Cup. The tournament was organized by the Asian Cricket Council (ACC).

Afghanistan A won the tournament, defeating Sri Lanka A by 7 wickets in the final.

== Teams ==
The teams were placed in the following groups.

Group A	Group B
Afghanistan A; Bangladesh A; Hong Kong; Sri Lanka A	India A; Oman A; Pakistan Shaheens; United Arab Emirates

== Squads ==
Afghanistan A	Bangladesh A	Hong Kong	India A
Darwish Rasooli (c); Qais Ahmad; Sharafuddin Ashraf; Sediqullah Atal; Faridoon Dawoodzai; Allah Mohammad Ghazanfar; Mohammad Ishaq (wk); Karim Janat; Nangialai Kharoti; Abdul Rahman Rahmani; Bilal Sami; Numan Shah (wk); Shahidullah; Wafiullah Tarakhil	Akbar Ali (c, wk); Saif Hassan (vc); Jishan Alam; Aliss Islam; Rakibul Hasan; Abu Hider; Parvez Hossain Emon; Shamim Hossain; Towhid Hridoy; Ripon Mondol; Maruf Mridha; Mohammad Naim; Mahfuzur Rahman Rabby; Rejaur Rahman Raja; Wasi Siddiquee	Nizakat Khan (c); Yasim Murtaza (vc); Zeeshan Ali (wk); Martin Coetzee; Babar Hayat; Rajab Hussain; Ateeq Iqbal; Aizaz Khan; Anas Khan; Ehsan Khan; Nasrulla Rana; Anshuman Rath; Ayush Shukla; Darsh Vora	Tilak Varma (c); Vaibhav Arora; Ayush Badoni; Rahul Chahar; Anshul Kamboj; Sai Kishore; Aaqib Khan; Anuj Rawat (wk); Rasikh Salam; Nishant Sindhu; Prabhsimran Singh (wk); Ramandeep Singh; Abhishek Sharma; Hrithik Shokeen; Nehal Wadhera
Oman	Pakistan Shaheens	Sri Lanka A	United Arab Emirates
Jatinder Singh (c, wk); Shakeel Ahmed; Wasim Ali; Aryan Bisht; Sandeep Goud; Aamir Kaleem; Mehran Khan; Sufyan Mehmood; Hammad Mirza (wk); Mohammad Nadeem; Jay Odedra; Muzahir Raza; Samay Shrivastava; Bukkapatnam Siddharth; Karan Sonavale	Mohammad Haris (c, wk); Abdul Samad; Abbas Afridi; Qasim Akram; Haider Ali; Shahnawaz Dahani; Ahmed Daniyal; Mohammad Imran; Haseebullah Khan (wk); Yasir Khan; Zaman Khan; Arafat Minhas; Mehran Mumtaz; Sufiyan Muqeem; Omair Yousuf	Nuwanidu Fernando (c); Sahan Arachchige; Lasith Croospulle; Dushan Hemantha; Dinura Kalupahana; Yashodha Lanka; Pramod Madushan; Eshan Malinga; Ramesh Mendis; Kavindu Nadeeshan; Pavan Rathnayake; Lahiru Udara (wk); Nimesh Vimukthi; Ahan Wickramasinghe; Isitha Wijesundara	Basil Hameed (c); Rahul Chopra; Muhammad Farooq; Muhammad Jawadullah; Nilansh Keswani; Mayank Kumar; Dhruv Parashar; Omid Shafi Rahman; Akif Raja; Syed Haider (wk); Aryansh Sharma (wk); Sanchit Sharma; Vishnu Sukumaran; Tanish Suri (wk); Ansh Tandon

Afghanistan also named Bashir Ahmad, Hassan Eisakhil, Sediqullah Pacha and Mohammad Saleem as reserve players.

== Warm-up matches ==
Before the start of the tournament, Afghanistan A played two warm-up matches against Oman A, followed by a T20 Tri-series involving hosts Oman A, Hong Kong and Afghanistan A.

Warm-up matches

9 October 2024
13:30
Scorecard

Afghanistan A 143 (19.4 overs)	v	Oman A 144/3 (18.3 overs)
Sharafuddin Ashraf 53* (35); Rafiullah 4/30 (4 overs)		Shoaib Khan 64 (43); Nangialai Kharoti 1/17 (3 overs)

Oman A won by 7 wickets
Oman Cricket Academy Ground, Al Amarat

- Afghanistan A won the toss and elected to bat.

10 October 2024
13:00
Scorecard

Afghanistan A 190/6 (20 overs)	v	Oman A 184/6 (20 overs)
Zubaid Akbari 56 (37); Sufyan Mehmood 3/24 (4 overs)		Vinayak Shukla 74 (41); Allah Mohammad Ghazanfar 3/25 (4 overs)

Afghanistan A won by 6 runs
Oman Cricket Academy Ground, Al Amarat

- Afghanistan A won the toss and elected to bat.

== Tri-nation Series ==
=== Round-robin ===
==== Points table ====
Pos	Team	Pld	W	L	NR	Pts	NRR	Qualification
1	Afghanistan A	2	2	0	0	4	2.715	Advanced to the final
2	Hong Kong	2	1	1	0	2	−1.198	Advanced to the final
3	Oman A	2	0	2	0	0	−1.225	

Source: CricClubs

==== Fixtures ====
12 October 2024
13:00
Scorecard

Oman A 147/9 (20 overs)	v	Hong Kong; 152/8 (20 overs)
Zeeshan Maqsood 60* (45); Ayush Shukla 3/14 (3 overs)		Anshuman Rath 61 (48); Kaleemullah 2/28 (4 overs)

Hong Kong won by 2 wickets
Oman Cricket Academy Ground, Al Amarat
Umpires: Azad KR (Oma) and Harikrishna Pillai (Oma)

- Hong Kong won the toss and elected to field.

13 October 2024
13:00
Scorecard

Hong Kong; 111/9 (20 overs)	v	Afghanistan A 116/3 (13.5 overs)
Nasrulla Rana 42 (35); Karim Janat 3/17 (4 overs)		Karim Janat 47* (27); Yasim Murtaza 2/19 (3 overs)

Afghanistan A won by 7 wickets
Oman Cricket Academy Ground, Al Amarat

- Afghanistan A won the toss and elected to field.

14 October 2024
13:00
Scorecard

Afghanistan A 211/3 (20 overs)	v	Oman A 167/7 (20 overs)
Darwish Rasooli 109* (57); Shakeel Ahmed 1/34 (4 overs)		Shoaib Khan 62 (43); Karim Janat 2/22 (4 overs)

Afghanistan A won by 44 runs
Oman Cricket Academy Ground, Al Amarat

- Oman A won the toss and elected to field.

=== Final ===
15 October 2024
13:00

Afghanistan A	v	Hong Kong

Match abandoned
Oman Cricket Academy Ground, Al Amarat

- No toss
- No play was possible due to rain.

== Group stage ==
The fixtures were announced by ACC on 20 September 2024.

=== Group A ===
==== Points table ====
Pos	Team	Pld	W	L	NR	Pts	NRR	Qualification
1	Sri Lanka A	3	2	1	0	4	0.833	Advanced to the semi-finals
2	Afghanistan A	3	2	1	0	4	0.212	Advanced to the semi-finals
3	Bangladesh A	3	1	2	0	2	−0.211	
4	Hong Kong	3	1	2	0	2	−0.844	

Source: ESPNcricinfo

==== Fixtures ====
18 October 2024
13:00
Scorecard

Hong Kong; 150/8 (20 overs)	v	Bangladesh A 151/5 (18.2 overs)
Babar Hayat 85 (61); Ripon Mondol 4/24 (4 overs)		Akbar Ali 45 (24); Ehsan Khan 3/12 (4 overs)

Bangladesh A won by 5 wickets
Oman Cricket Academy Ground, Al Amarat
Umpires: Akbar Ali (UAE) and Virender Sharma (Ind)
Player of the match: Ripon Mondol (Bangladesh A)

- Bangladesh A won the toss and elected to field.
- Jishan Alam and Mahfuzur Rahman Rabby (Bangladesh A) both made their T20 debuts.

18 October 2024
17:30 (D/N)
Scorecard

Afghanistan A 166/7 (20 overs)	v	Sri Lanka A 155 (19.3 overs)
Sediqullah Atal 83 (46); Dushan Hemantha 6/23 (4 overs)		Nuwanidu Fernando 51 (32); Faridoon Dawoodzai 3/40 (4 overs)

Afghanistan A won by 11 runs
Oman Cricket Academy Ground, Al Amarat
Umpires: Gazi Sohel (Ban) and Ramasamy Venkatesh (HK)
Player of the match: Sediqullah Atal (Afghanistan A)

- Sri Lanka A won the toss and elected to field.
- Dushan Hemantha (Sri Lanka A) took his first five-wicket haul in T20s.

20 October 2024
13:00
Scorecard

Sri Lanka A 178/5 (20 overs)	v	Hong Kong; 136/7 (20 overs)
Yashodha Lanka 56 (44); Ateeq Iqbal 2/26 (4 overs)		Yasim Murtaza 44 (31); Nipun Ransika 3/17 (3 overs)

Sri Lanka A won by 42 runs
Oman Cricket Academy Ground, Al Amarat
Umpires: Akbar Ali (UAE) and Nasir Hussain (Pak)
Player of the match: Yashodha Lanka (Sri Lanka A)

- Hong Kong won the toss and elected to field.

20 October 2024
17:30 (D/N)
Scorecard

Bangladesh A 164/4 (20 overs)	v	Afghanistan A 165/6 (19.1 overs)
Parvez Hossain Emon 54 (32); Sharafuddin Ashraf 1/9 (2 overs)		Sediqullah Atal 95* (55); Ripon Mondol 2/26 (4 overs)

Afghanistan A won by 4 wickets
Oman Cricket Academy Ground, Al Amarat
Umpires: Rahul Asher (Oma) and Virender Sharma (Ind)
Player of the match: Sediqullah Atal (Afghanistan A)

- Afghanistan A won the toss and elected to field.

22 October 2024
13:00
Scorecard

Afghanistan A 131 (19.5 overs)	v	Hong Kong; 133/5 (19.3 overs)
Sediqullah Atal 52 (41); Anas Khan 6/12 (3.5 overs)		Nizakat Khan 61 (53); Abdul Rahman Rahmani 3/17 (3 overs)

Hong Kong won by 5 wickets
Oman Cricket Academy Ground, Al Amarat
Umpires: Akbar Ali (UAE) and Gazi Sohel (Ban)
Player of the match: Anas Khan (HK)

- Afghanistan A won the toss and elected to bat.
- Anas Khan (HK) took his first five-wicket haul in T20s.

22 October 2024
17:30 (D/N)
Scorecard

Sri Lanka A 161/7 (20 overs)	v	Bangladesh A 142/7 (20 overs)
Pavan Rathnayake 42 (26); Rejaur Rahman Raja 2/35 (4 overs)		Abu Hider 38* (25); Dushan Hemantha 3/23 (4 overs)

Sri Lanka A won by 19 runs
Oman Cricket Academy Ground, Al Amarat
Umpires: Nasir Hussain (Pak) and Virender Sharma (Ind)
Player of the match: Dushan Hemantha (Sri Lanka A)

- Sri Lanka A won the toss and elected to bat.

=== Group B ===
==== Points table ====
Pos	Team	Pld	W	L	T	NR	Pts	NRR	Qualification
1	India A	3	3	0	0	0	6	2.481	Advanced to the semi-finals
2	Pakistan Shaheens	3	2	1	0	0	4	3.017	Advanced to the semi-finals
3	United Arab Emirates	3	1	2	0	0	2	−3.197	
4	Oman	3	0	3	0	0	0	−2.161	

Source: ESPNcricinfo

==== Fixtures ====
19 October 2024
13:00
Scorecard

Oman; 150/8 (20 overs)	v	United Arab Emirates; 151/6 (19.1 overs)
Jatinder Singh 54 (40); Muhammad Jawadullah 3/21 (4 overs); Muhammad Farooq 3/21 (4 overs)		Syed Haider 44* (28); Aamir Kaleem 2/18 (4 overs)

United Arab Emirates won by 4 wickets
Oman Cricket Academy Ground, Al Amarat
Umpires: Nasir Hussain (Pak) and Muhammad Sabir (Afg)
Player of the match: Syed Haider (UAE)

- United Arab Emirates won the toss and elected to field.
- Muzahir Raza, Karan Sonavale (Oman A) and Mayank Kumar (UAE) all made their T20 debuts.

19 October 2024
17:30 (D/N)
Scorecard

India A 183/8 (20 overs)	v	Pakistan Shaheens; 176/7 (20 overs)
Tilak Varma 44 (35); Sufiyan Muqeem 2/28 (4 overs)		Arafat Minhas 41 (29); Anshul Kamboj 3/33 (4 overs)

India A won by 7 runs
Oman Cricket Academy Ground, Al Amarat
Umpires: Rahul Asher (Oma) and Chamara de Soysa (SL)
Player of the match: Anshul Kamboj (India A)

- India A won the toss and elected to bat.

21 October 2024
13:00
Scorecard

Pakistan Shaheens; 185/5 (20 overs)	v	Oman; 111/7 (20 overs)
Qasim Akram 48 (38); Muzahir Raza 2/29 (3 overs)		Wasim Ali 28 (31); Zaman Khan 2/17 (3 overs)

Pakistan Shaheens won by 74 runs
Oman Cricket Academy Ground, Al Amarat
Umpires: Muhammad Sabir (Afg) and Gazi Sohel (Ban)
Player of the match: Rohail Nazir (Pakistan Shaheens)

- Pakistan Shaheens won the toss and elected to bat.

21 October 2024
17:30 (D/N)
Scorecard

United Arab Emirates; 107 (16.5 overs)	v	India A 111/3 (10.5 overs)
Rahul Chopra 50 (50); Rasikh Salam 3/15 (2 overs)		Abhishek Sharma 58 (24); Vishnu Sukumaran 1/10 (2 overs)

India A won by 7 wickets
Oman Cricket Academy Ground, Al Amarat
Umpires: Chamara de Soysa (SL) and Ramasamy Venkatesh (HK)
Player of the match: Rasikh Salam (India A)

- United Arab Emirates won the toss and elected to bat.

23 October 2024
13:00
Scorecard

Pakistan Shaheens; 179/4 (20 overs)	v	United Arab Emirates; 65 (16.3 overs)
Mohammad Haris 71* (49); Muhammad Farooq 3/27 (4 overs)		Rahul Chopra 20 (18); Shahnawaz Dahani 5/12 (4 overs)

Pakistan Shaheens won by 114 runs
Oman Cricket Academy Ground, Al Amarat
Umpires: Rahul Asher (Oma) and Chamara de Soysa (SL)
Player of the match: Shahnawaz Dahani (Pakistan Shaheens)

- Pakistan Shaheens won the toss and elected to bat.

23 October 2024
17:30 (D/N)
Scorecard

Oman; 140/5 (20 overs)	v	India A 146/4 (15.2 overs)
Mohammad Nadeem 41 (49); Ramandeep Singh 1/2 (1 over)		Ayush Badoni 51 (27); Karan Sonavale 1/9 (1 over)

India won by 6 wickets
Oman Cricket Academy Ground, Al Amarat
Umpires: Muhammad Sabir (Afg) and Ramasamy Venkatesh (HK)
Player of the match: Ayush Badoni (India A)

- Oman won the toss and elected to bat.

== Knockout stage ==
=== Bracket ===
Semi-finals
A1	Sri Lanka A	137/3 (16.3 overs)
B2	Pakistan Shaheens	135/9 (20 overs)
B1	India A	186/7 (20 overs)
A2	Afghanistan A	206/4 (20 overs)

Final
SF1W	Sri Lanka A	133/7 (20 overs)
SF2W	Afghanistan A	134/3 (18.1 overs)

=== Semi-finals ===
==== 1st semi-final ====
25 October 2024
13:00
Scorecard

Pakistan Shaheens; 135/9 (20 overs)	v	Sri Lanka A 137/3 (16.3 overs)
Omair Yousuf 68 (46); Dushan Hemantha 4/21 (4 overs)		Ahan Wickramasinghe 52* (46); Abbas Afridi 1/16 (3 overs)

Sri Lanka A won by 7 wickets
Oman Cricket Academy Ground, Al Amarat
Umpires: Rahul Asher (Oma) and Muhammad Sabir (Afg)
Player of the match: Dushan Hemantha (Sri Lanka A)

- Pakistan Shaheens won the toss and elected to bat.

==== 2nd semi-final ====
25 October 2024
17:30 (D/N)
Scorecard

Afghanistan A 206/4 (20 overs)	v	India A 186/7 (20 overs)
Sediqullah Atal 83 (52); Rasikh Salam 3/25 (4 overs)		Ramandeep Singh 64 (34); Allah Mohammad Ghazanfar 2/14 (3 overs)

Afghanistan A won by 20 runs
Oman Cricket Academy Ground, Al Amarat
Umpires: Chamara de Soysa (SL) and Gazi Sohel (Ban)
Player of the match: Sediqullah Atal (Afghanistan A)

- Afghanistan A won the toss and elected to bat.

=== Final ===
27 October 2024
17:30 (D/N)
Scorecard

Sri Lanka A 133/7 (20 overs)	v	Afghanistan A 134/3 (18.1 overs)
Sahan Arachchige 64* (47); Bilal Sami 3/22 (4 overs)		Sediqullah Atal 55* (55); Sahan Arachchige 2/8 (2 overs)

Afghanistan A won by 7 wickets
Oman Cricket Academy Ground, Al Amarat
Umpires: Akbar Ali (UAE) and Virender Sharma (Ind)
Player of the match: Allah Mohammad Ghazanfar (Afghanistan A)

- Sri Lanka A won the toss and elected to bat.
