= Asia Cup Rising Stars =

Cricket tournament in Asia

- Administrator: Asian Cricket Council (ACC)
- Format: List A & Twenty20
- First edition: 2013
- Latest edition: 2025
- Next edition: 2026
- Tournament format: Round-robin & knockout
- Number of teams: 8
- Current champion: Pakistan Shaheens (3rd title)
- Most successful: Pakistan Shaheens (3 titles)
- Most runs: Maaz Sadaqat (258)
- Most wickets: Ripon Mondol (11)

Asia Cup Rising Stars is a men's Twenty20 cricket tournament. Created by the Asian Cricket Council in 2013 as the ACC Emerging Teams Asia Cup, it aims to develop talented young cricketers of Asia. The first tournament as Asia Cup Rising Stars was played in Qatar in November 2025.

== Results ==
As ACC Emerging Teams Asia Cup:

| Year | Host nation | Final venue | Final | | |
| Year | Host nation | Final venue | Winner | Result | Runner-up |
|---|---|---|---|---|---|
| 2013; Details | Singapore | Kallang Ground, Singapore | India U23; 160/1 (33.4 overs) | India U23 won by 9 wickets scorecard | Pakistan Shaheens; 159 (47 overs) |
| 2017; Details | Bangladesh | Zahur Ahmed Chowdhury Stadium, Chattogram | Sri Lanka U23; 134/5 (23.5 overs) | Sri Lanka U23 won by 5 wickets scorecard | Pakistan Shaheens; 133 (42.1 overs) |
| 2018; Details | Sri Lanka; Pakistan | R. Premadasa Stadium, Colombo | Sri Lanka U23; 270/7 (50 overs) | Sri Lanka U23 won by 3 runs scorecard | India U23; 267/9 (50 overs) |
| 2019; Details | Bangladesh | Sher-e-Bangla National Cricket Stadium, Dhaka | Pakistan Shaheens; 301/6 (50 overs) | Pakistan Shaheens won by 77 runs scorecard | Bangladesh U23; 224 (43.3 overs) |
| 2023; Details | Sri Lanka | R. Premadasa Stadium, Colombo | Pakistan Shaheens; 352/8 (50 overs) | Pakistan Shaheens won by 128 runs Scorecard | India A 224 (40 overs) |
| 2024; Details | Oman | Oman Cricket Academy, Muscat | Afghanistan A 134/3 (18.1 overs) | Afghanistan A won by 7 wickets Scorecard | Sri Lanka A 133/7 (20 overs) |

As Asia Cup Rising Stars:

| Year | Host | No. of teams | Final | | | |
| Year | Host | No. of teams | Venue | Winner | Result | Runner-up |
|---|---|---|---|---|---|---|
| 2025; Details | (Qatar) | 8 | West End Park; Cricket Stadium, Doha | Pakistan A 125 (20 overs) & (7/0) | Match tied (Pakistan A won by a Super Over); Scorecard | Bangladesh A 125/9 (20 overs) & (6/2) |
| 2026; Details | (Qatar) | 8 | West End Park; Cricket Stadium, Doha | | | |

== Teams performance ==
The table below provides an overview of the performances of teams over past ACC Emerging Teams Asia Cup tournaments.

| Team | Appearances | | | Best result | Statistics | | | | | |
| Team | Total | First | Latest | Best result | Played | Won | Lost | Tie | NR | Win% |
|---|---|---|---|---|---|---|---|---|---|---|
| Pakistan Shaheens | 6 | 2013 | 2024 | Winner (2019, 2023, 2025) | 33 | 24 | 9 | 0 | 0 | 72.73 |
| Sri Lanka A | 6 | 2013 | 2024 | Winner (2017, 2018) | 30 | 18 | 12 | 0 | 0 | 60.00 |
| India A | 6 | 2013 | 2024 | Winner (2013) | 30 | 21 | 9 | 0 | 0 | 70.00 |
| Afghanistan A | 6 | 2013 | 2024 | Winner (2024) | 25 | 15 | 10 | 0 | 0 | 60.00 |
| Bangladesh A | 6 | 2013 | 2024 | Runner Up (2019, 2025) | 28 | 15 | 13 | 0 | 0 | 53.57 |
| United Arab Emirates | 4 | 2013 | 2024 | Semi-Final (2013) | 16 | 4 | 11 | 0 | 1 | 25.00 |
| Nepal | 4 | 2013 | 2023 | Group Stage (2013, 2018, 2019, 2023) | 12 | 3 | 9 | 0 | 0 | 25.00 |
| Oman | 4 | 2018 | 2024 | Group Stage (2018, 2019, 2023, 2024) | 15 | 2 | 13 | 0 | 0 | 13.33 |
| Hong Kong | 4 | 2017 | 2019 | Group Stage (2017, 2018, 2019, 2024) | 15 | 1 | 13 | 0 | 1 | 6.67 |
| Malaysia | 1 | 2017 | 2017 | Group Stage (2017) | 3 | 0 | 3 | 0 | 0 | 0.00 |
| Singapore | 1 | 2013 | 2013 | Group Stage (2013) | 3 | 0 | 3 | 0 | 0 | 0.00 |

=== Asia Cup Rising Stars ===
Key
| Legend | Meaning |
|---|---|
| C | Champion |
| RU | Runners-up |
| SF | Semi-finalist |
| GS | Group stage |
| Q | Qualified |
| DNQ | Did not qualify |

| Edition (No. of teams) | 2025 (8) | 2026 (8) | Apps |
| Host Team | (Qatar) | (Qatar) | Apps |
Full Members (Note: The "A" teams of the full member teams play in this tournament.)
| Afghanistan A | GS | GS | 2 |
| Bangladesh A | RU | Q | 2 |
| India A | SF | Q | 2 |
| Pakistan A | C | Q | 2 |
| Sri Lanka A | SF | Q | 2 |
Associate Members
| Hong Kong | GS | GS | 2 |
| Nepal | DNQ | Q | 1 |
| Oman | GS | DNQ | 1 |
| United Arab Emirates | GS | Q | 2 |

=== ACC Emerging Teams Asia Cup ===
| Legend | Meaning |
|---|---|
| 1st | Champion |
| 2nd | Runners-up |
| SF | Semi-finalist |
| DNQ | Did not qualify |
| Q | Qualified |
| WD | Withdrawn |
| GS | Group stage |
| | ICC Full Member Nation |

| Team \ Host | 2013 | 2017 | 2018 | 2019 | 2023 | 2024 |
| Team \ Host | (Singapore) | (Bangladesh) | (Sri Lanka) / (Pakistan) | (Bangladesh) | (Sri Lanka) | (Oman) |
|---|---|---|---|---|---|---|
| Afghanistan A | GS | SF | GS | SF | GS | 1st |
| Bangladesh A | GS | SF | SF | 2nd | SF | GS |
| Hong Kong | DNQ | GS | GS | GS | DNQ | GS |
| India A | 1st | GS | 2nd | SF | 2nd | SF |
| Malaysia | DNQ | GS | DNQ | DNQ | DNQ | DNQ |
| Nepal | GS | GS | DNQ | GS | GS | DNQ |
| Oman | DNQ | DNQ | GS | GS | GS | GS |
| Pakistan Shaheens | 2nd | 2nd | SF | 1st | 1st | SF |
| Singapore | GS | DNQ | DNQ | DNQ | DNQ | DNQ |
| Sri Lanka A | SF | 1st | 1st | GS | SF | 2nd |
| United Arab Emirates | SF | DNQ | GS | WD | GS | GS |

== Tournament summary ==
| Team | Appearances | | | Best result | Statistics | | | | | | |
| Team | Total | First | Latest | Best result | Pld | W | L | Tied | | N | Win% |
| Team | Total | First | Latest | Best result | Pld | W | L | W | L | N | Win% |
|---|---|---|---|---|---|---|---|---|---|---|---|
| Pakistan A | 1 | 2025 | | Champion (2025) | 5 | 4 | 0 | 1 | 0 | 0 | 100.00 |
| Bangladesh A | 1 | 2025 | | Runners-up (2025) | 5 | 2 | 1 | 1 | 1 | 0 | 60.00 |
| India A | 1 | 2025 | | Semi Final (2025) | 4 | 2 | 1 | 0 | 1 | 0 | 50.00 |
| Sri Lanka A | 1 | 2025 | | Semi Final (2025) | 4 | 2 | 2 | 0 | 0 | 0 | 50.00 |
| Afghanistan A | 1 | 2025 | | Group Stage (2025) | 3 | 2 | 1 | 0 | 0 | 0 | 66.67 |
| Oman | 1 | 2025 | | Group Stage (2025) | 3 | 1 | 2 | 0 | 0 | 0 | 33.33 |
| Hong Kong | 1 | 2025 | | Group Stage (2025) | 3 | 0 | 3 | 0 | 0 | 0 | 0.00 |
| United Arab Emirates | 1 | 2025 | | Group Stage (2025) | 3 | 0 | 3 | 0 | 0 | 0 | 0.00 |

== Debutant teams ==
| Year | Teams |
|---|---|
| 2013 | Afghanistan A, Bangladesh A, India A, Nepal, Pakistan Shaheens, Singapore, Sri Lanka A, United Arab Emirates |
| 2017 | Hong Kong, Malaysia |
| 2018 | Oman |

== Broadcasting ==
| Country(s) | Television broadcaster(s) | Online streaming |
|---|---|---|
| Bangladesh | T Sports | —N/a |
| Canada; United States | Willow TV | —N/a |
| India | Sony Sports Network | SonyLIV |
| Pakistan | PTV Sports | —N/a |
| Sri Lanka | Sony Sports Network; TV 1 | —N/a |

== See also ==
- Asia Cup
- Women's Asia Cup
- Under-19 Asia Cup
- Women's Under-19 Asia Cup
- Women's Emerging Teams Asia Cup
