= Bangladesh A cricket team =

Second-tier national cricket team of Bangladesh

Personnel
- Captain: Saif Hassan
- Coach: Jamie Siddons
- Owner: Bangladesh Cricket Board (BCB)

Team information
- Founded: 2 January 2001

History
- First-class debut: Pakistan in 5 January 2002 at Bangladesh Krira Shikkha Protisthan Cricket Ground, Savar

The Bangladesh A cricket team, also known as Bangladesh Emerging cricket team, is a cricket team representing Bangladesh, and is the second tier of international Bangladeshi cricket, below the full Bangladesh men's national cricket team. The team played its first game against the Pakistan national team, at Bangladesh Krira Shikkha Protisthan Cricket Ground on 5 January 2002.

== Tournament history ==
A red box around the year indicates tournaments played within Bangladesh

Key
Champions
Runners-up
Semi-finals

=== ACC Emerging Teams Asia Cup (ODI format) ===
ACC Emerging Teams Asia Cup records
Year	Round	Position	P	W	L	T	NR
(Singapore) 2013	Group Stage	6/8	3	1	2	0	0
(Bangladesh) 2017	Semi-finals	3/8	4	2	1	1	0
(Sri Lanka) / (Pakistan) 2018	Semi-finals	4/8	4	2	2	0	0
(Bangladesh) 2019	Runners-up	2/8	5	4	1	0	0
(Sri Lanka) 2023	Semi-finals	4/8	4	2	2	0	0
(Qatar) 2026		/8	0	0	0	0	0
Total	5/5	0 Title	20	11	8	1	0

=== ACC Emerging Teams Asia Cup (T20 format) ===
ACC Emerging Teams Asia Cup records
Year	Round	Position	P	W	L	T	NR
(Oman) 2024	Group Stage	5/8	3	1	2	0	0
(Qatar) 2025	Runners-up	2/8	5	3	2	0	0
Total	2/2	0 Title	8	4	4	0	0

== Tours by Bangladesh A ==
Bangladesh A have toured regularly. On their first two tours they took part in domestic competitions in the host countries. Since then they have played most of their tour matches against the host countries’ A teams, except for their tours of England, when they have mostly played against county teams.

=== 2001–02 Busta Cup in the West Indies ===
Between late January and early March 2002 Bangladesh A competed as the eighth team in the 2001–02 Busta Cup, the domestic first-class competition in the West Indies. Captained by the Test player Akram Khan, they played seven matches, winning one and losing five, and finished seventh. The average age of the team was 22, and they struggled to adapt to the conditions. None of the team scored a century. Mosaddek Hossain, who was 18 at the time, was the most successful player, taking 21 wickets with his leg-spin at an average of 32.23. The highest scorer was Mazharul Haque, with 451 runs at an average of 32.21.

The victory over Windward Islands was the first first-class victory by any Bangladeshi representative team. Tushar Imran, who was also 18 years old, scored 46 and 79 and was named man of the match. Mosaddek Hossain took 3 for 41 and 5 for 81 in the eight-run victory.

=== 2003–04 PCB Patron's Trophy in Pakistan ===
In December 2003 and January 2004 Bangladesh A competed in the 2003–04 PCB Patron's Trophy in Pakistan. Using 25 players, they played six matches, losing four and drawing the other two. Shahriar Hossain scored 218, the only double-century in that season's competition, in the drawn match against Defence Housing Authority.

During the same period Bangladesh A also competed in Pakistan's Patron's Cup List A tournament, winning two and losing four of their six matches.

=== 2004–05 in Zimbabwe ===
In February and March 2005, Bangladesh A played three first-class matches followed by five List A matches against Zimbabwe A in Bulawayo and Kwekwe. Captained by Shahriar Nafees, Bangladesh A won all three first-class matches, but under the captaincy of Sanwar Hossain they lost the List A series 2–3.

The highest first-class innings for Bangladesh A was scored by Mushfiqur Rahim, who made 111 not out and 50 in the second match, his second first-class match at the age of 16. He made his Test debut at Lord's three months later. Enamul Haque (aged 18), Shahadat Hossain (aged 18) and Shakib Al Hasan (aged 17) shared the bowling honours, Haque taking the best innings and match figures with 7 for 49 and 3 for 69 in the first match. All three subsequently played Test cricket.

=== 2005 in England ===
See Bangladesh A cricket team in England in 2005

Shortly after the Bangladeshi Test team toured England in 2005, a Bangladesh A team also toured, again captained by Shariar Nafees, playing five first-class matches (of which they lost three and drew two) and three List A matches (won two, lost one) in July and August. Six of the team had been part of the earlier Test squad. The outstanding player was Tushar Imran, who had not been part of the Test squad, who scored 467 runs in first-class matches at an average of 58.37, including the team's only two centuries.

=== 2006 in Zimbabwe ===
The tour to Zimbabwe in June and July 2006 followed the same pattern as the tour in 2005: three first-class matches followed by five List A matches, all against Zimbabwe A. This time, along with matches in Bulawayo and Kwekwe again, two matches were played in Mutare. Tushar Imran captained the team, most of whom had Test experience.

Bangladesh A won the first first-class match, drew the second, and lost the third; they won the List A series 4–1. The outstanding player in the first-class matches was Enamul Haque, who took five wickets in each first innings and finished with 22 wickets at an average of 17.18. The highest scorer in the first-class matches was Alok Kapali, with 336 runs, including two centuries, at an average of 67.20. Mehrab Hossain scored a century in each innings in the second match.

=== 2006–07 in Sri Lanka ===
Bangladesh A toured Sri Lanka in March and April 2007, playing two first-class and three List A matches against Sri Lanka A. Tushar Imran again captained the team. All five matches were lost by large margins. No centuries were scored.

=== 2008 in Ireland and England ===
A young team of 22 players toured Ireland and England from mid-June to early August 2008. Nobody was older than 26, and 17 were under 22. The captain, Junaid Siddique, was 20. They played four first-class matches (winning won and drawing three), four List A matches (winning one and losing three), one Twenty20 match (lost) and three minor matches. The only century was scored by Raqibul Hasan in the List A match against MCC.

=== 2010–11 in South Africa ===
Bangladesh A, captained by the experienced Test player Mohammad Ashraful, toured South Africa in April 2011, playing two first-class and four List A matches against South Africa A. South Africa A won all the matches comfortably, except for the second first-class match, which was ruined by rain, and the first List A match, in which Ashraful took 3 for 27 and made 118 not out off 99 balls to lead Bangladesh A to a six-wicket victory. Ashraful's was the only century for Bangladesh A.

=== 2011–12 in the West Indies ===
In November 2011 Bangladesh A visited the West Indies, playing two first-class, two Twenty20, and two List A matches against West Indies A in Antigua and Saint Vincent. The captain was Jahurul Islam.

They drew the first first-class match and lost the second by one wicket; they won the first Twenty20 by one wicket and lost the second by 55 runs; and they lost the two List A matches. Their only centuries came in the first match, when Mominul Haque (150) and Nasir Hossain (134) added 259 for the fifth wicket after the first four wickets had fallen for 59.

=== 2013 in England ===
An experienced 15-man Bangladesh A team, again captained by Jahurul Islam, toured England in August 2013, playing eight List A matches: five against county teams followed by three against England Lions. Bangladesh A had generally sound batting but ineffective bowling, and they lost their first seven matches. They won their last match after chasing the England Lions total of 319 for 7, when Farhad Reza hit a six off the last ball of the 50th over.

=== 2014 in the West Indies ===
In May and June 2014 Bangladesh A played seven matches in Barbados against teams representing the Sagicor High Performance Centre: two first-class, three List A and two Twenty20 matches. The young West Indians outclassed Bangladesh A in every match except the first Twenty20 match, which Bangladesh A won easily. Nasir Hossain captained the team in the two first-class matches, and Naeem Islam was the captain in the limited-overs matches.

=== 2015–16 in India ===
In September 2015 Bangladesh A visited India and played three List A matches against India A in Bangalore, and two first-class matches, one against Karnataka in Mysore and one against India A in Bangalore. The team was captained by Mominul Haque.

India A won the first and third List A matches. Bangladesh A won the second, thanks to Nasir Hossain, who scored 102 off 96 balls then took 5 for 36. Karnataka won their first-class match by four wickets, then India A overwhelmed Bangladesh A by an innings. In Bangladesh A's first innings, Sabbir Rahman, going to the wicket after the first three wickets had fallen for two runs, scored 122 not out off 131 balls out of a team total of 228.

=== 2015-16 in South Africa and Zimbabwe ===
A team captained by Shuvagata Hom toured South Africa and Zimbabwe a few weeks after the tour to India. They played four minor matches against South African provincial teams in Pretoria in October 2015, winning one and losing three, before going on to Zimbabwe in November to play five matches at the Harare Sports Club. They played three List A matches against Zimbabwe A, winning them all comfortably; Mithun Ali scored 100, 66 and 60. Two first-class matches followed which were evenly contested. Bangladesh A won the first by 14 runs and the second was drawn. Tasamul Haque scored 102 in the second match.

=== 2018 in Ireland ===
A team toured Ireland to play five unofficial ODIs (captained by Mominul Haque) and three unofficial T20s (captained by Soumya Sarkar) in August 2018.

=== 2019-20 in Sri Lanka ===
A team visited Sri Lanka in September and October 2019 to play three first-class matches and three List A matches. The captain in the first-class matches was Mominul Haque, and in the List A matches it was Mithun Ali.

=== 2024 in Pakistan ===
The Bangladesh A team visited Pakistan in August 2024 to play two first-class matches and three List A matches, all against Pakistan A. The first-class team was captained by Anamul Haque Bijoy, and the List A team was captained by Towhid Hridoy.

== Series in Bangladesh ==
=== 2019, Afghanistan A ===
Bangladesh A hosted Afghanistan A in July 2019 for two first-class and five 50-over matches.

=== 2021, Ireland Wolves ===
Ireland Wolves toured Bangladesh to play one first-class match, five 50-over matches and one Twenty20 match in February and March 2021.

== See also ==
- Bangladesh national under-19 cricket team
- Bangladesh national under-23 cricket team
- Bangladesh High Performance XI
- Bangladesh Cricket Board XI
