= Mosaddek Hossain (Bangladeshi cricketer) =

Mosaddek Hossain can refer to:

- Mosaddek Hossain (cricketer, born 1983), a Bangladeshi cricketer
- Mosaddek Hossain (cricketer, born 1995), a Bangladeshi international cricketer
