= 2017 South Africa A Team Tri-Series =

International cricket tour

- Date: 26 July-22 August 2017
- Location: South Africa
- Result: India A won the series
- Player of the series: (India) Manish Pandey
Teams
South Africa A	Afghanistan A	India A
Captains
Khaya Zondo	Shafiqullah	Manish Pandey
Most runs
Reeza Hendricks (266)	Rahmat Shah (150)	Manish Pandey (307)
Most wickets
Aaron Phangiso (10)	Rahmat Shah (5)	Shardul Thakur (9)

The 2017 South Africa A Team Tri-Series was a cricket tournament that took place in South Africa in July and August 2017. It was a tri-nation series between South Africa A, Afghanistan A and India A. The one-day matches were played as List A fixtures. Following the List A fixtures, South Africa A and India A played two four-day games with first-class status, also called unofficial Tests.

Originally, Australia A were scheduled to play in the series, but they withdrew in early July following an ongoing pay dispute with Cricket Australia. Later that month, Afghanistan A was named their replacement after the national team had been awarded test match status the previous month.

India A won the tri-series, beating South Africa A by 7 wickets in the competition's final. The first-class series was drawn 1–1, with South Africa A winning the first match and India A winning the second.

== List A series ==
=== Squads ===
Afghanistan A	India A	South Africa A
Shafiqullah (c); Afsar Zazai (wk); Usman Ghani; Javed Ahmadi; Rahmat Shah; Younas Ahmadzai; Nasir Jamal; Najibullah Zadran; Karim Janat; Sharafuddin Ashraf; Yamin Ahmadzai; Fareed Ahmad; Ihsanullah; Younas Ahmadzai; Nawaz Khan; Mohammad Ibrahim	Manish Pandey (c); Mandeep Singh; Shreyas Iyer; Sanju Samson; Deepak Hooda; Karun Nair; Krunal Pandya; Rishabh Pant (wk); Vijay Shankar; Axar Patel; Yuzvendra Chahal; Jayant Yadav; Basil Thampi; Mohammed Siraj; Shardul Thakur; Siddarth Kaul	Khaya Zondo (c); Farhaan Behardien; Junior Dala; Henry Davids; Beuran Hendricks; Reeza Hendricks; Heinrich Klaasen; Mangaliso Mosehle; Willem Mulder; Dane Paterson; Aaron Phangiso; Dwaine Pretorius; Tabraiz Shamsi; Jason Smith; Jon-Jon Smuts

=== 1st match ===
26 July 2017
Scorecard

India A 152 (41.5 overs)	v	South Africa A 153/8 (37.4 overs)
Manish Pandey 55 (95); Aaron Phangiso 4/30 (10 overs)		Dwaine Pretorius 38 (54); Yuzvendra Chahal 3/41 (9.4 overs)

South Africa A won by 2 wickets
Groenkloof Oval, Pretoria
Umpires: Adrian Holdstock (SA) and Bongani Jele (SA)
Player of the match: Dwaine Pretorius (South Africa A)

- South Africa A won the toss and elected to field.

=== 2nd match ===
28 July 2017
Scorecard

Afghanistan A 149 (40.5 overs)	v	India A 150/3 (30.4 overs)
Sharafuddin Ashraf 39* (27); Vijay Shankar 3/24 (7 overs)		Karun Nair 57 (83); Yamin Ahmadzai 1/26 (7 overs)

India A won by 7 wickets
LC de Villiers Oval, Pretoria
Umpires: Sam Nogajski (Aus) and Allahudien Paleker (SA)
Player of the match: Karun Nair (India A)

- India A won the toss and elected to field.

=== 3rd match ===
30 July 2017
Scorecard

South Africa A 336/5 (50 overs)	v	Afghanistan A 172 (32.2 overs)
Reeza Hendricks 173* (145); Rahmat Shah Zurmatai 2/58 (10 overs)		Rahmat Shah Zurmatai 55 (54); Tabraiz Shamsi 4/19 (8 overs)

South Africa A won by 164 runs
Groenkloof Stadium, Pretoria
Umpires: Adrian Holdstock (SA) and Bongani Jele (SA)
Player of the match: Reeza Hendricks (South Africa A)

- Afghanistan A won the toss and elected to field.

=== 4th match ===
1 August 2017
Scorecard

India A 322/5 (50 overs)	v	Afghanistan A 209/9 (50 overs)
Manish Pandey 86* (87); Sharafuddin Ashraf 2/48 (10 overs)		Najibullah Zadran 62 (78); Mohammed Siraj 3/49 (8 overs)

India A won by 113 runs
LC de Villiers Oval, Pretoria
Umpires: Sam Nogajski (Aus) and Brad White (SA)
Player of the match: Manish Pandey (India A)

- Afghanistan A won the toss and elected to field.

=== 5th match ===
3 August 2017
Scorecard

South Africa A 266 (48.2 overs)	v	India A 267/9 (49.4 overs)
Heinrich Klaasen 127 (108); Shardul Thakur 4/35 (8.2 overs)		Manish Pandey 93* (85); Junior Dala 3/55 (9 overs)

India A won by 1 wicket
LC de Villiers Oval, Pretoria
Umpires: Adrian Holdstock (SA) and Sam Nogajski (Aus)
Player of the match: Heinrich Klaasen (South Africa A)

- India A won the toss and elected to field.

=== 6th match ===
5 August 2017
Scorecard

Afghanistan A 202/9 (50 overs)	v	South Africa A 203/7 (36.4 overs)
Usman Ghani 54 (65); Aaron Phangiso 3/39 (10 overs)		Reeza Hendricks 76 (76); Rahmat Shah 2/44 (9.4 overs)

South Africa A won by 7 wickets
LC de Villiers Oval, Pretoria
Umpires: Bongani Jele (SA) and Brad White (SA)
Player of the match: Aaron Phangiso (South Africa A)

- South Africa A won the toss and elected to field.

=== Final ===
8 August 2017
Scorecard

South Africa A 267/7 (50 overs)	v	India A 270/3 (46.5 overs)
Farhaan Behardien 101* (114); Shardul Thakur 3/52 (10 overs)		Shreyas Iyer 140* (131); Junior Dala 2/49 (8 overs)

India A won by 7 wickets
LC de Villiers Oval, Pretoria
Umpires: Adrian Holdstock (SA) and Sam Nogajski (Aus)
Player of the match: Shreyas Iyer (India A)

- India A won the toss and elected to field.

== First-class series ==
=== Squads ===
India A	South Africa A
Karun Nair (c); Priyank Panchal; ~~Abhinav Mukund~~; Shreyas Iyer; Ankit Bawne; Sudip Chatterjee; Ishan Kishan (wk); Hanuma Vihari; Jayant Yadav; Shahbaz Nadeem; Navdeep Saini; Mohammed Siraj; Shardul Thakur; Aniket Choudhary; Ankit Rajpoot; Ravikumar Samarth	Aiden Markram (c); Stephen Cook; Junior Dala; Beuran Hendricks; Heinrich Klaasen; David Miller; Duanne Olivier; Dane Paterson; Andile Phehlukwayo; Dane Piedt; Omphile Ramela; Rudi Second; Jason Smith; Shaun von Berg; Khaya Zondo

Ravikumar Samarth replaced Abhinav Mukund following the former's selection to the India squad for the Sri Lanka tour.

=== 1st unofficial Test ===
12–15 August 2017
Scorecard

South Africa A	v	India A
346 (117.3 overs); Stephen Cook 120 (252); Mohammed Siraj 4/61 (26 overs)		120 (39 overs); Shreyas Iyer 31 (32); Beuran Hendricks 3/23 (7 overs)
220/5d (56.3 overs); Aiden Markram 79 (120); Navdeep Saini 3/20 (9 overs)		211 (52.1 overs); Ankit Bawne 46 (82); Junior Dala 5/36 (10.1 overs)

South Africa A won by 235 runs
Willowmoore Park, Benoni
Umpires: Shaun George (SA) and Sam Nogajski (Aus)
Player of the match: Stephen Cook (South Africa A)

- South Africa A won the toss and elected to bat.

=== 2nd unofficial Test ===
19–22 August 2017
Scorecard

South Africa A	v	India A
322 (124.4 overs); Stephen Cook 98 (205); Shahbaz Nadeem 4/118 (40 overs)		276 (89.4 overs); Ravikumar Samarth 77 (113); Dane Piedt 4/70 (19.4 overs)
177 (65.2 overs); Stephen Cook 70* (196); Ankit Rajpoot 3/15 (7.2 overs)		226/4 (62.3 overs); Karun Nair 90 (144); Dane Piedt 2/75 (19 overs)

India A won by 6 wickets
Senwes Park, Potchefstroom
Umpires: Adrian Holdstock (SA) and Sam Nogajski (Aus)
Player of the match: Ravikumar Samarth (India A)

- South Africa A won the toss and elected to bat.
