= Cricket Board of Maldives =

Governing body for cricket in the Maldives

Cricket Board of Maldives is the official governing body of the sport of cricket in Maldives and controls the Maldives national cricket team. Its current headquarters is in Malé, the capital of Maldives. Cricket Board of Maldives is the Maldives representative at the International Cricket Council and is an associate member and has been a member of that body since 2001. It is also a member of the Asian Cricket Council.
