= Afghanistan A cricket team =

Second-tier national team

Afghanistan A
- Association: Afghanistan Cricket Board

Personnel
- Captain: Darwish Rasooli
- Coach: Nawroz Mangal

Team information
- Founded: 2013
- Home ground: Kabul International Cricket Stadium, Kabul, Afghanistan
- Capacity: 6000

The Afghanistan A cricket team is a national cricket team representing Afghanistan. It is the 'second-tier' of international Afghan cricket, below the full Afghanistan national cricket team. Matches played by Afghanistan A are not considered to be One Day Internationals, instead receiving List A classification. Their first match was against the Tajikistan national cricket team in December 2013. In 2017, they played a five-match series against the Zimbabwe A cricket team in Zimbabwe.

In July 2017, they were added to the South Africa A Team Tri-Series, after Australia A withdrew. They toured Bangladesh in July 2019, playing two first-class and five 50-over matches against Bangladesh A. In October 2024, the Afghanistan A team played in the ACC emerging team asia cup tournament where they won matches against Sri Lanka and Bangladesh A but lost against Honk Kong A. However they won against India A in the semi final by scoring the highest ever total in the tournament history of 206. 2024 ACC Emerging Teams Asia Cup final was played between Afghanistan A and Sri Lanka A Team on 27 October 2024 which Afghanistan A won and won their first title as such.

== Tournament History ==
A red box around the year indicates tournaments played within Afghanistan

Key
Champions
Runners-up
Semi-finals

=== ACC Emerging Teams Asia Cup ===
ACC Emerging Teams Asia Cup record
Year	Round	Position	P	W	L	T	NR
(Singapore) 2013	Group Stage	5/8	3	2	1	0	0
(Bangladesh) 2017	Semi-finals	4/8	4	2	2	0	0
(Sri Lanka) (Pakistan) 2018	Group Stage	6/8	3	1	2	0	0
(Bangladesh) 2019	Semi-finals	4/8	4	2	2	0	0
(Sri Lanka) 2023	Group Stage	5/8	3	2	1	0	0
(Oman) 2024	Champion	1/8	5	4	1	0	0
(Qatar) 2025	Group Stage	5/8	3	2	1	0	0
(Qatar) 2026	Group Stage	/8	0	0	0	0	0
Total	1 Title	–	25	15	10	0	0
