= University of Doha for Science and Technology =

University in Doha, Qatar

- Type: Public
- Established: 2022; 4 years ago
- President: Dr. Salem bin Nasser Al-Naemi
- Location: Al Tarafa, Jelaiah Street Duhail North, Doha, Qatar, Qatar; 25°21′38.3″N 51°28′55.3″E
- Campus: 150,000 square meters; Suburban
- Website: www.udst.edu.qa

The University of Doha for Science and Technology (UDST) is a public institution of higher education in Qatar, established by Amiri Decision No. 13 of 2022. It is recognized as the country’s first national university focused on applied, technical, and professional education.

UDST offers a range of over 70 academic programs, including Bachelor’s and Master’s degrees, as well as diploma programs. The university comprises five colleges: the College of Business, College of Computing and Information Technology, College of Engineering and Technology, College of Health Sciences, and the College of General Education. It also operates specialized training centers serving both individuals and corporate entities.

The university emphasizes student-centered learning and features modern educational infrastructure. Its faculty includes internationally recognized academics and researchers who contribute to student development and support the preparation of graduates for roles across various economic sectors. UDST plays a role in advancing Qatar’s national goals related to human, social, and economic development.

== History ==
The University of Doha for Science and Technology (UDST) was officially established in 2022 by Amiri Decision, but its roots trace back to the College of the North Atlantic-Qatar (CNA-Q), which was founded in 2001. CNA-Q was the result of a partnership between the Qatari government and a Canadian institution, created to provide technical education and skilled employees for Qatar's growing economy, particularly for the energy sector. The college initially focused on offering diplomas and certificates through its hands-on, applied-learning approach. For over two decades, it served as a vital institution for technical and vocational education and training (TVET) in Qatar.

The transition from CNA-Q to UDST was a strategic step towards full national independence. By 2022, the former college was reborn as Qatar's first national applied university, broadening its scope beyond technical training. While retaining its commitment to experiential learning, UDST expanded its curriculum to offer a wider array of applied bachelor's and master's degrees. This transformation was designed to better align with Qatar's National Vision 2030, which aims for a knowledge-based economy. As an independent institution, UDST now has its own leadership and strategic direction, positioning itself as a key contributor to Qatar's national development by producing highly qualified professionals across various fields.

== Academics ==
As of 2023, over 70 academic programs are offered by the university, including bachelor's degrees, master's degrees, and diplomas which are divided into five streams - Engineering Technology, Business Management, Computing and Information Technology, Health Sciences and General Education. For students who require additional preparation, UDST provides a Foundation Program to help them build the skills needed for their academic and professional journeys.

== Admission ==
Citizens of Qatar and children of Qatari women are exempted from tuition fees for undergraduate programs. For undergraduate programs, applicants who have completed high school must typically have a minimum average of 60% in their final year, along with meeting specific subject-related requirements. All applicants are required to take the UDST Academic Placement Tests for English and Math, or submit equivalent, internationally recognized test scores for a waiver.

== Student life ==
Student life at UDST is supported by a vibrant campus community with numerous opportunities for both academic and personal growth. The Student Engagement department oversees a variety of initiatives, including student clubs, campus-wide events, and a Student Council, fostering meaningful connections and personal development. The university provides extensive support services through Student Central Services, which offers academic advising, career guidance, and peer tutoring. A wide range of sports and wellness facilities are available, including fitness centers, swimming pools, and courts for various sports, which help promote a healthy and active student body. UDST also has a strict, culturally sensitive dress code for students while on campus. Resources like a campus bookstore, the university's business incubator (UHUB), and a robust alumni network further enrich the student experience. The mascot is an Arabian wolf.

== Sports venues ==
=== Cricket Field ===
University of Doha for Science and Technology Cricket Ground
- UDST Cricket Ground
- Interactive map of University of Doha for Science and Technology Cricket Ground

Ground information
- Location: Al Tarafa, Jelaiah Street Duhail North, Doha, Qatar
- Country: Qatar
- Capacity: 2,000
- Owner: University of Doha for Science and Technology
- Tenants: Qatar Cricket Association; Qatar cricket team

International information
- First men's ODI: 22 November 2026: United Arab Emirates v Nepal
- First men's T20I: 27 February 2024: Qatar v Hong Kong
- Last men's T20I: 13 November 2025: Qatar v Hong Kong

Team information
Qatar cricket team	(2024–present)
- As of 24 November 2026; Source: Cricinfo

The University of Doha for Science and Technology Cricket Ground or UDST Cricket Ground, is a cricket ground located on the of University of Doha for Science and Technology in Doha, Qatar. The first T20I match was held here on 27 February 2024.

Notable Competitions

- 2024 T20 World Cup Asia Sub-regional Qualifier B
- 2026 Asia Cup Rising Stars

== See also ==
- List of universities and colleges in Qatar
