= Gurjapneet Singh =

Indian cricketer (born 1998)

Personal information
- Born: 8 November 1998 (age 28); Ludhiana, Punjab, India
- Height: 6 ft 4 in (193 cm)
- Batting: Right-handed
- Bowling: Left-arm fast-medium
- Role: Bowler

Domestic team information
- Years: Team
- 2021–2022: Dindigul Dragons
- 2023–present: Madurai Panthers
- 2024–present: Tamil Nadu
- 2025–present: Chennai Super Kings (squad no. 9)

Career statistics
Competition	FC	LA	T20
Matches	8	2	15
Runs scored	88	–	10
Batting average	12.57	–	5.00
100s/50s	0/0	–/–	0/0
Top score	29	–	7*
Balls bowled	1363	66	332
Wickets	31	2	21
Bowling average	20.74	39.5	24.38
5 wickets in innings	1	0	0
10 wickets in match	0	0	0
Best bowling	6/22	1/39	3/18
Catches/stumpings	1/–	1/–	3/–
- Source: ESPNcricinfo, 22 December 2025

Gurjapneet Singh (born 8 November 1998) is an Indian cricketer who plays for Tamil Nadu in domestic cricket and Chennai Super Kings in the Indian Premier League. He is a left arm medium fast bowler and right-handed batter.

== Early life ==
Gurjapneet Singh was born on 8 November 1998, in a Sikh family, in Ludhiana, Punjab, India. He lived in Ambala during his early years, before moving to Chennai in 2017. He completed his college education from Guru Nanak College, Chennai.

== Career ==
Gurjapneet played for Egmore RC in the Tamil Nadu Cricket Association third division league. He was picked up by the Dindigul Dragons for the 2021 season of the Tamil Nadu Premier League (TNPL). He took seven wickets in nine matches for the Dragons in the tournament. However, a back injury ruled him out of most of 2022. He moved to Madurai Panthers for the 2023 TNPL season and finished as the second highest wicket taker with 15 wickets at an average of 14.1. He represented the Panthers in the 2024 and 2025 seasons of the TNPL.

In September 2024, Gurjapneet was one of the net bowlers for the Indian cricket team in the lead-up to their first Test match in the home series against Bangladesh at M. A. Chidambaram Stadium in Chennai. During his bowling to Virat Kohli, he bowled him out. Gurjapneet later said that Kohli had given him advice about adjusting his angle to bowl around the wicket when the ball wasn't moving. He made his first-class debut for Tamil Nadu cricket team in the 2024-25 Ranji Trophy against Saurashtra. He took six wickets for 22 runs on his debut, including the wicket of Cheteshwar Pujara, whom he trapped leg-before for a duck. These were the best bowling figures by a Tamil Nadu fast bowler in a home match since 2005–06. In his maiden Ranji season, he took 13 wickets in four matches.

Gurjapneet was as a net bowler for the Indian Premier League (IPL) franchise Chennai Super Kings during the 2024 IPL season. In the player auction conducted ahead of the 2025 IPL season, he was bought by the Super Kings for ₹22 million (US$240,000). This figure was more than seven times his pre-auction base price. However, he did not play any matches for the Super Kings during the tournament. In September 2025, he was announced as part of the India A squad for the home series against Australia A.

Singh took the wicket of Axar Patel in April 2026 with his first ball on IPL debut for Chennai Super Kings against Delhi Capitals.

== Bowling style ==
Gurjapneet is a tall (6’3”) left-arm fast bowler. He is described as capable of bowling regularly at speeds of above 130 km/h (81 mph) with the ability to hit the pitch hard and extract bounce and pace from the surface whilst being in possession of a deceptive back-of-the-hand slower ball and the ability to bowl yorkers.
