= Asian Cricket Council =

Sports governing body

- Abbreviation: ACC
- Formation: September 19, 1983; 43 years ago
- Purpose: Cricket administration
- Headquarters: Dubai, United Arab Emirates
- Region served: Asia
- Members: 30
- Official language: English
- President: Mohsin Naqvi
- Vice president: Pankaj Khimji
- Website: asiancricket.org

The Asian Cricket Council (ACC) is the governing body of cricket in most countries and territories in Asia. The ACC was established in 1983, to promote and develop the sport of cricket in Asia. Subordinate to the International Cricket Council, the council is the continent's regional administrative body, and currently consists of 30 member associations. Mohsin Naqvi is the current president of the ACC.

== History ==
The council was formed as the Asian Cricket Conference in New Delhi, India, on 19 September 1983, with the original members being Bangladesh, India, Malaysia, Pakistan, Singapore, and Sri Lanka. Changing its name to the present in 1995. Until 2003, the headquarters of the council were rotated biennially amongst the presidents' and secretaries' home countries. The organization's current president is Mohsin Naqvi.

The council runs a development program that supports coaching, umpiring and sports medicine programs in member countries, funded from television revenues collected during the officially sanctioned Asian Cricket Council tournaments including the Asia Cup, Under-19 Asia Cup, Women's Asia Cup and various other tournaments.

Previously ACC was headquartered in Colombo, Sri Lanka, which was officially opened on 20 August 2016. In 2019, the headquarters of the ACC was moved to Dubai, near the International Cricket Council (ICC) office.

== Members of ACC ==
No.	Country	Association	ICC Membership	ACC Membership
Full Members of ICC (5)
1	Afghanistan	Afghanistan Cricket Board	2017 (Note: Afghanistan was granted associate membership of ICC in 2014, before getting promoted to Full Member in 2017.)	2001
2	Bangladesh	Bangladesh Cricket Board	2000 (Note: Bangladesh became associate member of ICC in 1977, and later promoted to Full Member in 2000.)	1983
3	India	Board of Control for Cricket in India	1926	1983
4	Pakistan	Pakistan Cricket Board	1952	1983
5	Sri Lanka	Sri Lanka Cricket	1981 (Note: Sri Lanka became associate member of ICC in 1965, before getting Full Membership in 1981. Sri Lanka was also the first associate member to get full member status.)	1983
Associate Members of ICC with ODI & T20I status (3)
6	Nepal	Cricket Association of Nepal	1996	1990
7	Oman	Oman Cricket Board	2014	2000
8	United Arab Emirates	Emirates Cricket Board	1990	1984
Associate Members of ICC with T20I status (20)
9	Bahrain	Bahrain Cricket Association	2017	2003
10	Bhutan	Bhutan Cricket Council Board	2017	2001
11	Cambodia	Cricket Association of Cambodia	2022	2012
12	China	Chinese Cricket Association	2017	2004
13	Hong Kong	Cricket Hong Kong, China	1969	1983
14	Indonesia	Indonesian Cricket Association	2001	2024 (Note: Indonesia has ACC membership while still remaining a part of ICC EAP region for ICC events qualification pathways.)
15	Iran	Islamic Republic of Iran Cricket Association	2017	2003
16	Japan	Japan Cricket Association	1989	2024 (Note: Japan has ACC membership while still remaining a part of ICC EAP region for ICC events qualification pathways. Japan was also a member of the ACC between 1996–2001.)
17	Kuwait	Kuwait Cricket Association	2005	2005
18	Malaysia	Malaysian Cricket Association	1967	1983
19	Maldives	Cricket Control Board of Maldives	2017	1996
20	Mongolia	Mongolia Cricket Association	2021	2025
21	Myanmar	Myanmar Cricket Federation	2017	2005
22	Philippines	Philippine Cricket Association	2000	2025 (Note: Philippines has ACC membership while still remaining a part of ICC EAP region for ICC events qualification pathways.)
23	Qatar	Qatar Cricket Association	2017	2000
24	Saudi Arabia	Saudi Arabian Cricket Federation	2016	2003
25	Singapore	Singapore Cricket Association	1974	1983
26	Tajikistan	Tajikistan Cricket Federation	2021	2024
27	Thailand	Cricket Association of Thailand	2005	1996
28	Uzbekistan	Cricket Federation of Uzbekistan	2022	2025
Non-members of ICC (2)
29	Brunei	Brunei Darussalam National Cricket Association	2002–2015	1996
30	Chinese Taipei	Chinese Taipei Cricket Association	—N/a	2012

=== Former members of Asian Cricket Council ===
Former ACC members that became part of the ICC East Asia-Pacific
No.	Country	Association	ICC Membership Status	ICC Membership	ACC Membership
1	Fiji	Fiji Cricket Association	Associate	1965	1996–2001
2	Papua New Guinea	Cricket PNG	Associate	1973	1996–2001

== Competitions ==
Tournament	Recent	Current champions	Runners-up	Next
Men's
Asia Cup	2025	India	Pakistan	2027
Asia Cup Rising Stars	2025	Pakistan Shaheens	Bangladesh A	2026
Men's Premier Cup	2026	Nepal	United Arab Emirates	2028
Men's Challenger Cup	2026	Malaysia	Singapore	2028
Men's Under-19 Asia Cup	2026	India	Pakistan	2027
Under-19 Men's Premier Cup	2025	United Arab Emirates	Nepal	2027
Under-16 East Zone Cup	2025	Nepal	Singapore	2026
Under-16 West Zone Cup	2025	United Arab Emirates	Kuwait	2026
Women's
Women's Asia Cup	2026	India	Sri Lanka	2028
Women's Asia Cup Rising Stars	2026	India A	Bangladesh A	2028
Women's Premier Cup	2026	Thailand	United Arab Emirates	2028
Women's Under-19 Asia Cup	2024	India	Bangladesh	2026
Under-19 Women's Premier Cup	2026	United Arab Emirates; Thailand	—N/a	2028

=== Defunct events ===
- Afro-Asia Cup
- ACC Championship
- Asian Test Championship
- ACC Premier League
- ACC Trophy
- ACC Twenty20 Cup
- ACC Eastern Region T20
- ACC Western Region T20

== Officials ==
=== Executive Board members ===
ACC Executive Board Members
Name	Board	Post
Mohsin Naqvi	Pakistan Cricket Board	President
Pankaj Khimji	Oman Cricket	Vice President
Shammi Silva	Sri Lanka Cricket	Executive Board Member
Rajeev Shukla	Board of Control for Cricket in India	Executive Board Member
Tamim Iqbal Khan	Bangladesh Cricket Board	Executive Board Member
Mirwais Ashraf	Afghanistan Cricket Board	Executive Board Member
Khalid Al Zarooni	Emirates Cricket Board	Executive Board Member
Mohamed Faisal	Cricket Control Board of Maldives	Executive Board Member
Ashish Shelar	Board of Control for Cricket in India	Ex Officio; BCCI
Salman Naseer	Pakistan Cricket Board	PCB
Ashley De Silva	Sri Lanka Cricket	Ex Officio; CEO, SLC
Nizam Uddin Chowdhury	Bangladesh Cricket Board	Ex Officio; CEO, BCB
Naseeb Khan	Afghanistan Cricket Board	Ex-officio, CEO, ACB

As of 30 May 2025

=== ACC Finance and Marketing Committee ===
ACC Finance and Marketing Committee
Name	Board	Post
Shammi Silva	Sri Lanka Cricket	Chairman, Finance and Marketing Committee
Mohsin Naqvi	Pakistan Cricket Board	President
Aminul Islam Bulbul	Bangladesh Cricket Board	Member
Naseeb Khan	Afghanistan Cricket Board	Ex-Officio; CEO, ACB
Anoop Gidwani	Cricket Hong Kong, China	Member
Thusith Perera	Sri Lanka Cricket	GM Convenor, GM – Finance & Operations

== Development team ==
=== ACC Development Committee ===
ACC Development Committee
Aminul Islam Bulbul	Bangladesh Cricket Board	Chairman, Development Committee
Mohsin Naqvi	Pakistan Cricket Board	President
Faisal Al Marzouk	Kuwait Cricket Association	Member
Mahmood Gaznavi	Singapore Cricket Association	Member
Chatur Bahadur Chand	Cricket Association of Nepal	Member

=== Resource staff (Umpiring) ===
- Bomi Jamula– India
- Peter Manuel – Sri Lanka
- Mahboob Shah – Pakistan

== Presidents ==
Sl. No	Name	Country	Term
1	N. K. P. Salve	India	1983–1985
2	Gamini Dissanayake	Sri Lanka	1985–1987
3	Lt. Gen. G.S Butt	Pakistan	1987
4	Lt. Gen. Zahid Ali Akbar Khan	Pakistan	1988–1989
5	Anisul Islam Mahmud	Bangladesh	1989–1991
6	Abdulrahman Bukhatir	United Arab Emirates	1991–1993
7	Madhavrao Scindia	India	1993
8	IS Bindra	India	1993–1997
9	Upali Dharmadasa	Sri Lanka	1997–1998
10	Thilanga Sumathipala	Sri Lanka	1998–1999
11	Mujibur Rahman	Pakistan	1999
12	Zafar Altaf	Pakistan	1999–2000
13	Lt. Gen. Tauqir Zia	Pakistan	2000–2002
14	Mohammad Ali Asghar Lobby	Bangladesh	2002–2004
15	Jagmohan Dalmiya	India	2004–2005
16	Sharad Pawar	India	2006
17	Jayantha Dharmadasa	Sri Lanka	2006–2007
18	Arjuna Ranatunga	Sri Lanka	2008
19	Dr. Nasim Ashraf	Pakistan	2008
20	Ijaz Butt	Pakistan	2008–2010
21	Mustafa Kamal	Bangladesh	2010–2012
22	N. Srinivasan	India	2012–2014
23	Jayantha Dharmadasa	Sri Lanka	2014–2015
24	Thilanga Sumathipala	Sri Lanka	2015–2016
25	Shehreyar Khan	Pakistan	2016
26	Ehsan Mani	Pakistan	2016–2018
27	Nazmul Hassan	Bangladesh	2018–2021
28	Jay Shah	India	2021–2024
29	Shammi Silva	Sri Lanka	2024–2025
30	Mohsin Naqvi	Pakistan	2025–present

== See also ==
- International Cricket Council
- Africa Cricket Association
- European Cricket Council
- ICC Americas
- ICC East Asia-Pacific
- ICC Europe
- Cricket at the Asian Games
- List of Asian XI ODI cricketers
- ACC Emerging Teams Asia Cup
- ACC Premier Cup
- ACC Women's Premier Cup
- ACC Under-19 Cup
- ACC Twenty20 Cup
- Asia XI
- List of Asia Cup cricket records
