= Bangladesh Women's National Cricket League =

Bangladeshi women's cricket competition

- Countries: Bangladesh
- Administrator: Bangladesh Cricket Board
- Format: Limited overs cricket (50 or 20 overs per side)
- First edition: 2006–07
- Latest edition: 2025–26
- Tournament format: League
- Number of teams: 8
- Current champion: Barisal Division
- Most successful: Khulna Division (5 titles)

The Bangladesh Women's National Cricket League is a women's domestic cricket competition in Bangladesh, with the first edition taking place in 2006–07. The competition is variously played using 50 or 20 over formats.

Eight teams, each representing one of the eight administrative divisions of Bangladesh, compete in the tournament. The most successful side in the history of the tournament is Khulna Division, with five title wins.

== History ==
The tournament began in 2006–07, with eight teams competing in 50-over matches in two groups, followed by a semi-final and final. Results of this tournament are not recorded. The following season, 2008–09, saw a change in the teams competing, with six teams representing six administrative divisions of Bangladesh competing in a round-robin group. Khulna Division won the tournament, winning all five of their matches. This format was retained for the following season, 2009–10, with Khulna Division again winning all five of their matches to win the tournament.

In 2010–11, the tournament was played as a Twenty20 competition, with two rounds of group stages. Khulna Division once again won the tournament, beating Rajshahi Division in the final. The tournament reverted to a 50-over competition for following seasons, with Khulna Division again winning in 2011–12 before Rangpur Division, in their first season competing in the Women's National Cricket League, won the title in 2012–13. 2015 was again a Twenty20 competition, although results are unrecorded. The 2017 season saw the addition of an eighth team, Mymensingh Division, and saw Khulna Division claim their fifth title as the tournament was again competed as a 50-over competition. The tournament returned to being a Twenty20 format in 2017–18, and saw Sylhet Division claim their first title. In 2018–19 the competition took place with a 50 over format, although results are unrecorded.

In 2021–22 the Women's Zonal One-Day Competition took place instead of the Women's National Cricket League, with four zonal teams competing in 50-over matches. The tournament returned for the 2022–23 season, taking place in August 2022 with a Twenty20 format. Sylhet Division won the 2022–23 tournament.

== Teams ==
Team	First	Last	Titles
Ansar and Village Defence Party	2006–07	2006–07	0
Barisal Division	2008–09	2025–26	1
Bhola	2006–07	2006–07	0
Bogra	2006–07	2006–07	0
Chittagong	2006–07	2006–07	0
Chittagong Division	2008–09	2025–26	0
Dhaka	2006–07	2006–07	0
Dhaka Division	2008–09	2025–26	0
Jahangirnagar University	2006–07	2006–07	0
Khulna	2006–07	2006–07	0
Khulna Division	2008–09	2025–26	5
Mymensingh Division	2017	2025–26	1
Narayanganj	2006–07	2006–07	0
Rajshahi	2006–07	2006–07	0
Rajshahi Division	2008–09	2025–26	0
Rangamati	2006–07	2006–07	0
Rangpur Division	2012–13	2025–26	1
Sylhet Division	2008–09	2025–26	2

== Results ==
Season	Winners	Runners-up	Format	Ref
2006–07	Unknown		50 overs	
2008–09	Khulna Division	Rajshahi Division	50 overs	
2009–10	Khulna Division	Rajshahi Division	50 overs	
2010–11	Khulna Division	Rajshahi Division	T20	
2011–12	Khulna Division	Dhaka Division	50 overs	
2012–13	Rangpur Division	Khulna Division	50 overs	
2015	Unknown		T20	
2017	Khulna Division	Rajshahi Division	50 overs	
2017–18	Sylhet Division	Rajshahi Division	T20	
2018–19	Unknown		50 overs	
2022–23	Sylhet Division	Barisal Division	T20	
2024–25	Mymensingh Division	Chittagong Division	T20	
2025–26	Barisal Division	Khulna Division	T20	

== See also ==
- National Cricket League
