= Mosaddek Hossain (cricketer, born 1983) =

Bangladeshi cricketer (born 1983)

Personal information
- Full name: Mohammad Mosaddek Hossain
- Batting: Right-handed
- Bowling: Right-arm Leg break

Career statistics
Competition	FC	List A
Matches	20	7
Runs scored	521	43
Batting average	19.29	7.16
100s/50s	1/1	-/-
Top score	140	14
Balls bowled	2,907	267
Wickets	55	9
Bowling average	30.14	24.11
5 wickets in innings	2	0
10 wickets in match	0	N/A
Best bowling	5/46	4/29
Catches/stumpings	4/-	1/-
- Source: CricketArchive, 6 November 2016

Mohammad Mosaddek Hossain (born 25 November 1983 in Mymensingh, Dhaka), is a former first-class and List A cricketer from Bangladesh who was a right-handed batsman and a right-arm leg break bowler. He was sometimes known by his nickname "Rubel".

He played for Dhaka Division from 2000–01 to 2003, his career ending shortly before his 20th birthday. He played in seven one day matches for the Bangladesh Under-19s in the 2000 Under-19 Cricket World Cup. He scored one first-class century, making 140 against Chittagong Division and took five wickets in an innings twice, with 5 for 46 for Bangladesh A against the Leeward Islands in 2001-02 being his best performance. His other five-wicket haul also came during Bangladesh A's tour of the West Indies: he took 3 for 41 and 5 for 81 against the Windward Islands to help bring about the first first-class victory by any Bangladeshi representative team.
