= Ayush Shukla =

Indian-born Hong Kong cricketer

Personal information
- Full name: Ayush Shukla
- Born: 28 October 2002 (age 24); Boisar, Mumbai, India
- Batting: Right-handed
- Bowling: Right-arm medium
- Role: Bowler

International information
- National side: Hong Kong
- T20I debut (cap 37): 11 July 2022 v Uganda
- Last T20I: 2 September 2024 v Singapore

Career statistics
Competition	T20I	List A
Matches	35	10
Runs scored	23	44
Batting average	3.28	11.0
100s/50s	0/0	0/0
Top score	6*	44
Balls bowled	627	366
Wickets	30	9
Bowling average	28.90	35.55
5 wickets in innings	0	0
10 wickets in match	0	0
Best bowling	4/49	2/47
Catches/stumpings	6/–	1/–
- Source: ESPNcricinfo, 2 September 2024

Ayush Shukla (born 28 October 2002) is a Hong Kong cricketer. He debuted for the Hong Kong national side in 2022, and has since played regularly for the team.

== International career ==
On 24 May 2022, he was named in the Hong Kong's squad for the World Cup Challenge League matches, where he made his List A debut for Hong Kong against Italy. On July 6, 2022, he was named in the Hong Kong squad for the 2022 ICC Men's T20 World Cup Global Qualifier B where he made his Twenty20 International (T20I) debut against Uganda in Zimbabwe. On August 31, 2024, during the match against Mongolia in the Asia Sub-regional Qualifier A, he became the third bowler to bowl four consecutive maiden overs in a T20I match.
