= Pakistan A cricket team =

Second-tier national team

- Pakistan Shaheens Crest
- Nickname: Pakistan Shaheens

Personnel
- Test captain: Saud Shakeel
- One Day captain: Khawaja Nafay
- T20I captain: Irfan Khan Niazi

Team information
- City: Lahore, Punjab, Pakistan
- Founded: 1964; 62 years ago

History
- First-class debut: Ceylon Board President's XI in 21 August 1964 at Paikiasothy Saravanamuttu Stadium, Borella, Colombo
- Official website: Official Website

The Pakistan A cricket team, or Pakistan Shaheens, is a national cricket team representing Pakistan. It is the second-tier of international Pakistan cricket, below the full Pakistan national cricket team. Matches played by Pakistan A are not considered to be Test matches or One Day Internationals, receiving first-class and List A classification respectively. Pakistan A played their first match in August 1964, a three-day first-class contest against Ceylon Board President's XI.

Pakistan A have played a number of series, both home and away, against other national A teams, and competed against other first-class opposition. Their first tour was to Ceylon (now Sri Lanka) in 1964–65. Pakistan A did not play another match until the 1991 season when they again toured Sri Lanka, a series against England A the previous season having been cancelled due to the Gulf War.

== Honours ==
=== ACC ===
- ACC Emerging Teams Asia Cup:
  - Champions (3): 2019, 2023, 2025
  - Runners-up (2): 2013, 2017

== See also ==
- Pakistan cricket team
- Pakistan Under-19 cricket team
