= Sri Lanka A cricket team =

Second-tier national team

Sri Lanka 'A'

Personnel
- Captain: Nipun Dananjaya, Dunith Wellalage
- Coach: Avishka Gunawardene

Team information
- Founded: 1991

History
- First-class debut: England A in 1991 at Galle International Stadium
- Official website: Official Website

The Sri Lanka A cricket team is a national cricket team representing Sri Lanka. It is the second-tier of international Sri Lankan cricket, below the full Sri Lanka national cricket team. Matches played by Sri Lanka A are not considered to be Test matches or One Day Internationals, instead receiving first-class and List A classification, respectively. Sri Lanka A played their first match on 2 February 1991, a 45-over contest against England A that the Sri Lankans won by 4 wickets.

Sri Lanka A have played a number of series, both home and away against other national A teams, and competed against other first-class opposition.

Sri Lanka A Cricket team has the world record for the highest 7th wicket partnership in List A history (Rangana Herath & Thilina Kandamby put on 203*).

5 different captains have led the Sri Lanka A team in T20 matches.

== Tournament History ==
A red box around the year indicates tournaments played within Sri Lanka

Key
Champions
Runners-up
Semi-finals

=== ACC Emerging Teams Asia Cup ===
ACC Emerging Teams Asia Cup record
Year	Round	Position	P	W	L	T	NR
(Singapore) 2013	Semi-final	3/8	4	3	1	0	0
(Bangladesh) 2017	Champions	1/8	5	4	1	0	0
(Sri Lanka) (Pakistan) 2018	Champions	1/8	5	4	1	0	0
(Bangladesh) 2019	Group stage	7/8	3	0	3	0	0
(Sri Lanka) 2023	Semi-final	3/8	4	2	2	0	0
(Oman) 2024	Runners-up	2/8	5	3	2	0	0
Total	2 Title	-	26	16	10	0	0

== Current squad ==
Name	Age	Batting Style	Bowling Style	Club
Batsmen
Pathum Nissanka	28	Right-handed		Nondescripts
Sangeeth Cooray	31	Left-handed	Right-arm off spin	Colts
Ashan Priyanjan	37	Right-handed	Right-arm off spin	Colombo
Bhanuka Rajapaksa	35	Left-handed	Right-arm medium	Burgher
Sadeera Samarawickrama	31	Right-handed		Colts
All-rounders
Kamindu Mendis	28	Left-handed	Slow left-arm orthodox Right-arm off spin	Chilaw Marians
Ashen Bandara	26	Left-handed	Right-arm leg spin	Colombo
Dasun Shanaka	35	Right-handed	Right-arm medium	Sinhalese
Shehan Jayasuriya	35	Left-handed	Right-arm off spin	Chilaw Marians
Wicket-keeper
Niroshan Dickwella	33	Left-handed		Nondescripts
Spin Bowlers
Lakshan Sandakan	35	Right-handed	Slow left-arm wrist-spin	Colombo
Akila Dananjaya	33	Left-handed	Right-arm off spin Right-arm leg spin	Colts
Malinda Pushpakumara	39	Right-handed	Slow left-arm orthodox	Colombo
Ramesh Mendis	31	Right-handed	Right-arm off spin	Moors
Pace Bowlers
Lahiru Kumara	29	Left-handed	Right-arm fast	Nondescripts
Vishwa Fernando	35	Right-handed	Left-arm medium-fast	Colombo
Chamika Karunaratne	30	Right-handed	Right-arm medium-fast	Nondescripts
Asitha Fernando	29	Right-handed	Right-arm medium-fast	Chilaw Marians
Ishan Jayaratne	37	Right-handed	Right-arm fast-medium	Ragama

== See also ==
- Sri Lanka A cricket team in South Africa in 2024
