= India A cricket team =

Second-tier national team

India 'A'

Personnel
- Test captain: Rishabh Pant
- One Day captain: Ruturaj Gaikwad
- T20I captain: Ayush Badoni
- Coach: Hrishikesh Kanitkar

Team information
- Founded: 1992

History
- First-class debut: England A in 14-17 January 1995 at M. Chinnaswamy Stadium
- Official website: bcci.tv
First-class kit
List A kit
T20 kit

The India A cricket team is a national cricket team representing second-tier cricket of India national cricket team. The matches played by India A receive first-class and List A classification. It is a developmental team composed of domestic players who are about to get picked and are in contention for national team get selected in this team or some international players who are not in national team contention also sometimes play.

The team had played in NKP Salve Challenger Trophy as India Red, Its names were changed for the 2006 version of this tournament. India A became India Red. The team has won the NKP Salve Challenger Trophy four times (2001/02, 2003/04, 2004,05, 2009/10) and shared the trophy thrice (1998/99, 2006/07, 2011/12). They won the Duleep Trophy in 2024.

== Coaching staff ==
Position	Name
Head coach	Hrishikesh Kanitkar
Batting coach	Hrishikesh Kanitkar
Fielding coach	Subhodeep Ghosh
Fast bowling coach	Troy Cooley
Spin bowling coach	Sairaj Bahutule
Physiotherapist	Dr Gaurav Rajendra Sharma
Strength & conditioning coach	Anand Date
Performance analyst	Devraj Raut
Massuer	Mangesh Gaikwad

== Current squad ==
This is a list of players who have received an India A call-up in the last 12 months, as of 14 May 2026.

Players with international caps are marked in bold.

Name	Age	Batting style	Bowling style	Domestic team	Formats
Batters
**Vaibhav Sooryavanshi**	15	Left-handed	Slow left-arm orthodox	Bihar	LA
Abhimanyu Easwaran	31	Right-handed	Right-arm leg spin	Bengal	FC
**Ruturaj Gaikwad**	29	Right-handed	Right-arm off spin	Maharashtra	FC & LA
Shaik Rasheed	22	Right-handed	Right-arm leg spin	Andhra	FC
**Yashasvi Jaiswal**	24	Left-handed	Right-arm leg spin	Mumbai	FC
**Sarfaraz Khan**	29	Right-handed	Right-arm leg spin	Mumbai	FC
**Karun Nair**	34	Right-handed	Right-arm off spin	Vidarbha	FC
**Devdutt Padikkal**	26	Left-handed	Right-arm off spin	Karnataka	FC
**Sai Sudharsan**	25	Left-handed	Right-arm leg spin	Tamil Nadu	FC
**Tilak Varma**	24	Left-handed	Right-arm off spin	Hyderabad	LA
**Rajat Patidar**	33	Right-handed	Right-arm off spin	Madhya Pradesh	LA
Priyansh Arya	25	Left-handed	Right-arm off spin	Delhi	LA
Yash Rathod	26	Left-handed	Slow left-arm orthodox	Vidarbha	FC
All-rounders
**Harsh Dubey**	24	Left-handed	Slow left-arm orthodox	Vidarbha	FC
Tanush Kotian	28	Right-handed	Right-arm off spin	Mumbai	FC
**Nitish Kumar Reddy**	23	Right-handed	Right-arm medium-fast	Andhra	FC
Nishant Sindhu	22	Left-handed	Slow left-arm orthodox	Haryana	LA
**Manav Suthar**	24	Left-handed	Slow left-arm orthodox	Rajasthan	FC
**Shardul Thakur**	35	Right-handed	Right-arm medium-fast	Mumbai	FC
Anukul Roy	27	Left-handed	Slow left-arm orthodox	Jharkhand	LA
**Suryansh Shedge**	23	Right-handed	Right-arm medium	Mumbai	LA
Vipraj Nigam	24	Right-handed	Right-arm leg break	Uttar Pradesh	LA
Arshad Khan	28	Left-handed	Left-arm fast-medium	Madhya Pradesh	LA
Ayush Badoni	32	Right-handed	Right-arm off break	Delhi	LA
**Saransh Jain**	33	Left-handed	Right-arm off break	Madhya Pradesh	FC
Shams Mulani	29	Left-handed	Slow left-arm orthodox	Mumbai	FC
Wicket-keepers
**KL Rahul**	34	Right-handed	—N/a	Karnataka	FC
**Dhruv Jurel**	25	Right-handed	—N/a	Uttar Pradesh	FC
**Ishan Kishan**	28	Left-handed	Right-arm leg spin	Jharkhand	FC
Abishek Porel	24	Left-handed	—N/a	Bengal	FC
Narayan Jagadeesan	30	Right-hander	—N/a	Tamil Nadu	FC
Prabhsimran Singh	26	Right-handed	—N/a	Punjab	LA
**Rishabh Pant**	29	Left-handed	—N/a	Delhi	FC
Kumar Kushagra	22	Right-handed	—N/a	Jharkhand	FC & LA
Spin bowlers
**Rahul Chahar**	27	Right-handed	Right-arm leg break	Rajasthan	T20
**Sai Kishore**	30	Left-handed	Slow left-arm orthodox	Tamil Nadu	T20
Hrithik Shokeen	26	Right-handed	Right-arm off break	Delhi	T20
Pace bowlers
**Khaleel Ahmed**	28	Right-handed	Left-arm fast-medium	Rajasthan	FC
**Yash Thakur**	27	Right-handed	Right-arm fast-medium	Vidarbha	FC & LA
**Ashok Sharma**	23	Right-handed	Right-arm Fast	Rajasthan	LA
Yash Dayal	28	Right-handed	Left-arm fast-medium	Uttar Pradesh	FC
**Akash Deep**	29	Right-handed	Right-arm fast-medium	Bengal	FC
**Tushar Deshpande**	31	Right-handed	Right-arm medium-fast	Mumbai	FC
**Anshul Kamboj**	25	Right-handed	Right-arm fast-medium	Haryana	FC, LA
**Prasidh Krishna**	30	Right-handed	Right-arm fast-medium	Karnataka	FC
**Mukesh Kumar**	33	Right-handed	Right-arm fast-medium	Bengal	FC
**Harshit Rana**	24	Right-handed	Right-arm fast-medium	Delhi	FC
**Auqib Nabi**	29	Right-handed	Right-arm medium-fast	Jammu & Kashmir	FC
Mukesh Choudhary	30	Left-handed	Left-arm fast-medium	Maharashtra	FC
Gurjapneet Singh	27	Right-handed	Left-arm fast-medium	Tamil Nadu	LA
**Gurnoor Brar**	26	Left-handed	Right-arm Fast	Punjab	FC

== See also ==
- India men's national cricket team
- India women's national cricket team
- India national under-19 cricket team
- India women's national under-19 cricket team
- India B cricket team
- Board of control for cricket in india (BCCI)
- BCCI Awards
- National Cricket Academy (NCA)
- Cricket in India
- Sport in India – Overview of sports in India
- Glossary of cricket terms
