= Nepal cricket team in England in 2027 =

International cricket tour

The Nepal national cricket team are scheduled to tour England in June 2027 to play One Day International (ODI) and Twenty20 International (T20I) matches against the Bangladesh national cricket team, Ireland national cricket team, and Scotland national cricket team. Hosted by the Marylebone Cricket Club (MCC) as part of its partnership with the Cricket Association of Nepal (CAN), the series is named the MCC hosted Nepal tour of England. All matches on the tour have been sanctioned by the England and Wales Cricket Board (ECB) and are recognised as official international fixtures by the International Cricket Council (ICC).

== Nepal v Scotland ==
Scottish cricket team against Nepal in England in 2027
	Nepal	Scotland
- Dates: 1 June 2027

One Day International series

The Scotland cricket team are scheduled to tour England in June 2027 to play against Nepal cricket team. The tour consists of only one One Day International (ODI) match. In November 2026, the Cricket Association of Nepal (CAN), Cricket Scotland (CS) and the Marylebone Cricket Club (MCC) confirmed the fixture for the tour.

=== Squads ===
Nepal	Scotland

=== Only ODI ===
1 June 2027
[ Scorecard]

Nepal	v	Scotland

Wormsley Park, High Wycombe

== Nepal v Bangladesh ==
Bangladeshi cricket team against Nepal in England in 2027
	Nepal	Bangladesh
- Dates: 3 June 2027

Twenty20 International series

The Bangladesh cricket team are scheduled to tour England in June 2027 to play against Nepal cricket team. The tour consists of only one Twenty20 International (T20I) match. In November 2026, the Cricket Association of Nepal (CAN) and the Marylebone Cricket Club (MCC) confirmed the fixture for the tour.

=== Squads ===
Nepal	Bangladesh

=== Only T20I ===
3 June 2027
[ Scorecard]

Nepal	v	Bangladesh

Lord's, London

== Nepal v Ireland ==
Irish cricket team against Nepal in England in 2027
	Nepal	Ireland
- Dates: 6 – 12 June 2026

One Day International series

Twenty20 International series

The Ireland cricket team are scheduled to tour England in June 2027 to play against Nepal cricket team. The tour consists of one One Day International (ODI) and three Twenty20 International (T20I) matches. In November 2026, the Cricket Association of Nepal (CAN) and the Marylebone Cricket Club (MCC) confirmed the fixture for the tour.

=== Squads ===
Nepal	Ireland

=== Only ODI ===
6 June 2027
[ Scorecard]

Nepal	v	Ireland

Wormsley Park, High Wycombe

=== 1st T20I ===
9 June 2027
[ Scorecard]

Nepal	v	Ireland

Wormsley Park, High Wycombe

=== 2nd T20I ===
11 June 2027
[ Scorecard]

Nepal	v	Ireland

County Cricket Ground, Beckenham

=== 3rd T20I ===
12 June 2027
[ Scorecard]

Nepal	v	Ireland

County Cricket Ground, Beckenham

== See also ==
- International cricket in 2026–27
- International cricket in 2027
