= International cricket in 2030 =

International cricket season

The 2030 International cricket season will take place from April 2030 to September 2030. This calendar includes men's Test, men's ODI, men's T20I, women's Test, women's ODI and women's T20I matches mainly involving full member teams, as well as some other significant series. In addition to the matches shown here, a number of other T20I series involving associate nations are being played during this period.

The 2030 Men's T20 World Cup will take place jointly in England, Ireland and Scotland in July and August.

== Season overview ==
=== Men's events ===
International tours
Start date	Home team	Away team	Results [Matches]		
Start date	Home team	Away team	Test	ODI	T20I
			—N/a	—N/a	—N/a
International tournaments
Start date	Tournament				Winners
4 July 2030	(England) (Republic of Ireland) (Scotland) 2030 Men's T20 World Cup				

=== Women's events ===
Women's international tours
Start date	Home team	Away team	Results [Matches]		
Start date	Home team	Away team	Test	ODI	T20I

== See also ==
- International cricket in 2029–30
- International cricket in 2031–32
