= Associate international cricket in 2026–27 =

International cricket season

The 2026–27 Associate international cricket season includes series starting from approximately October 2026 to March 2027. All official 20-over matches between associate members of the ICC are eligible to have full men's Twenty20 International or women's Twenty20 International (T20I) status, as the International Cricket Council (ICC) granted T20I status to matches between all of its members from 1 July 2018 (women's teams) and 1 January 2019 (men's teams). The season includes all T20I cricket series mostly involving ICC Associate members, that are played in addition to series covered in International cricket in 2026–27.

== Season overview ==
=== Men's events ===
International tours
Start date	Home team	Away team	Results [Matches]
Start date	Home team	Away team	T20I
3 October 2026	South Korea	Indonesia	4–0 [4]
15 November 2026	Falkland Islands	Costa Rica	6–2 [8]
12 December 2026	Gambia	Mali	[5]
26 December 2026	Bhutan	Maldives	[5]
International tournaments
Start date	Tournament		Winners
5 October 2026	(Malaysia) 2026 Men's T20 World Cup Asia Sub-regional Qualifier A		Kuwait
8 October 2026	(Malaysia) 2026 Men's T20 World Cup Asia Sub-regional Qualifier B		Saudi Arabia
20 October 2026	(Nigeria) 2026 Men's T20 World Cup Africa Sub-regional Qualifier C		Nigeria
4 December 2026	(Bhutan) 2026 Gelephu Men's T20I Series		
15 December 2026	(Bhutan) 2026 Gelephu Men's T20I Tri-Nation Series		

=== Women's events ===
International tours
Start date	Home team	Away team	Results [Matches]
Start date	Home team	Away team	T20I
24 October 2026	Mexico	Argentina	0–3 [3]
6 January 2027	Saint Helena	Falkland Islands	[5]
30 January 2027	Bhutan	Oman	[3]
International tournaments
Start date	Tournament		Winners
15 October 2026	(Romania) 2026 ECA Women's European Cup		Sweden
6 November 2026	(Uganda) 2026 Victoria Series		Uganda
20 November 2026	2026 Malaysia Women's Tri-Nation Series		
13 January 2027	(Bhutan) 2027 Lotus Women's Cup		
22 January 2027	(Bhutan) 2027 Mindful Women's Cup		

== October ==
=== Indonesia in South Korea ===
T20I series
No.	Date	Venue	Result
T20I 4155	3 October	Yeonhui Cricket Ground, Incheon	South Korea by 7 wickets
T20I 4157	4 October	Yeonhui Cricket Ground, Incheon	South Korea by 9 wickets
T20I 4158	5 October	Yeonhui Cricket Ground, Incheon	South Korea by 8 wickets
T20I 4161	5 October	Yeonhui Cricket Ground, Incheon	South Korea by 42 runs

=== 2026 Men's T20 World Cup Asia Sub-regional Qualifier A ===
Qualifier A standings
Pos	Team	Pld	W	L	NR	Pts	NRR	Qualification
1	Kuwait	6	5	1	0	10	5.775	Advanced to the regional final
2	Bahrain	6	5	1	0	10	2.283	Advanced to the regional final
3	Qatar	6	4	1	1	9	1.960	Advanced to the regional final
4	Thailand	6	3	3	0	6	1.518	Eliminated
5	Bhutan	6	2	4	0	4	−1.139	Eliminated
6	Myanmar	6	1	5	0	2	−2.013	Eliminated
7	Mongolia	6	0	5	1	1	−8.450	Eliminated

Source: Cricinfo

Round-robin
No.	Date	Team 1	Team 2	Venue	Result
T20I 4159	5 October	Bhutan	Myanmar	Bayuemas Oval, Pandamaran	Bhutan by 27 runs
T20I 4160	5 October	Bahrain	Thailand	UKM-YSD Cricket Oval, Bangi	Bahrain by 7 runs
T20I 4162	5 October	Kuwait	Qatar	Bayuemas Oval, Pandamaran	Kuwait by 58 runs
T20I 4163	6 October	Qatar	Thailand	Bayuemas Oval, Pandamaran	Qatar by 7 wickets
T20I 4164	6 October	Bahrain	Bhutan	Bayuemas Oval, Pandamaran	Bahrain by 66 runs
T20I 4165	6 October	Kuwait	Mongolia	UKM-YSD Cricket Oval, Bangi	Kuwait by 10 wickets
T20I 4167	8 October	Kuwait	Thailand	Bayuemas Oval, Pandamaran	Kuwait by 9 wickets
T20I 4168	8 October	Bhutan	Mongolia	UKM-YSD Cricket Oval, Bangi	Bhutan by 136 runs
T20I 4169	8 October	Bahrain	Myanmar	Selangor Turf Club, Kuala Lumpur	Bahrain by 8 wickets
T20I 4173	9 October	Mongolia	Thailand	Bayuemas Oval, Pandamaran	Thailand by 183 runs
T20I 4174	9 October	Bahrain	Kuwait	UKM-YSD Cricket Oval, Bangi	Bahrain by 6 wickets
T20I 4175	9 October	Myanmar	Qatar	Selangor Turf Club, Kuala Lumpur	Qatar by 9 wickets
T20I 4184	11 October	Kuwait	Myanmar	Bayuemas Oval, Pandamaran	Kuwait by 9 wickets
T20I 4185	11 October	Bhutan	Qatar	UKM-YSD Cricket Oval, Bangi	Qatar by 9 wickets
T20I 4186	11 October	Bahrain	Mongolia	Selangor Turf Club, Kuala Lumpur	Bahrain by 8 wickets
T20I 4192	12 October	Mongolia	Qatar	Bayuemas Oval, Pandamaran	No result
T20I 4193	12 October	Myanmar	Thailand	UKM-YSD Cricket Oval, Bangi	Thailand by 9 wickets
T20I 4194	12 October	Bhutan	Kuwait	Selangor Turf Club, Kuala Lumpur	Kuwait by 8 wickets
T20I 4196	14 October	Mongolia	Myanmar	UKM-YSD Cricket Oval, Bangi	Myanmar by 9 wickets
T20I 4197	14 October	Bahrain	Qatar	Selangor Turf Club, Kuala Lumpur	Qatar by 2 wickets
T20I 4199	14 October	Bhutan	Thailand	Selangor Turf Club, Kuala Lumpur	Thailand by 34 runs

=== 2026 Men's T20 World Cup Asia Sub-regional Qualifier B ===
Qualifier B standings
Pos	Team	Pld	W	L	NR	Pts	NRR	Qualification
1	Saudi Arabia	5	5	0	0	10	3.147	Advanced to the regional final
2	Hong Kong	5	3	1	1	7	2.471	Advanced to the regional final
3	Malaysia (H)	5	3	2	0	6	2.506	Advanced to the regional final
4	Singapore	5	2	3	0	4	−0.670	Eliminated
5	Maldives	5	1	3	1	3	−2.390	Eliminated
6	China	5	0	5	0	0	−5.074	Eliminated

Source: Cricinfo
(H) Host

Round-robin
No.	Date	Team 1	Team 2	Venue	Result
T20I 4170	8 October	China	Maldives	Bayuemas Oval, Pandamaran	Maldives by 10 wickets
T20I 4171	8 October	Saudi Arabia	Singapore	UKM-YSD Cricket Oval, Bangi	Saudi Arabia by 75 runs
T20I 4172	8 October	Malaysia	Hong Kong	Selangor Turf Club, Kuala Lumpur	Hong Kong by 7 runs (DLS)
T20I 4176	9 October	Malaysia	Saudi Arabia	Bayuemas Oval, Pandamaran	Saudi Arabia by 3 wickets
T20I 4177	9 October	China	Hong Kong	UKM-YSD Cricket Oval, Bangi	Hong Kong by 8 wickets
T20I 4178	9 October	Maldives	Singapore	Selangor Turf Club, Kuala Lumpur	Singapore by 33 runs
T20I 4181	11 October	Hong Kong	Saudi Arabia	Bayuemas Oval, Pandamaran	Saudi Arabia by 10 runs
T20I 4182	11 October	Malaysia	Maldives	UKM-YSD Cricket Oval, Bangi	Malaysia by 6 wickets
T20I 4183	11 October	China	Singapore	Selangor Turf Club, Kuala Lumpur	Singapore by 50 runs
T20I 4189	12 October	Malaysia	Singapore	Bayuemas Oval, Pandamaran	Malaysia by 37 runs
T20I 4190	12 October	Hong Kong	Maldives	UKM-YSD Cricket Oval, Bangi	No result
T20I 4191	12 October	China	Saudi Arabia	Selangor Turf Club, Kuala Lumpur	Saudi Arabia by 64 runs
T20I 4198	14 October	Malaysia	China	Bayuemas Oval, Pandamaran	Malaysia by 6 wickets
T20I 4200	14 October	Hong Kong	Singapore	Bayuemas Oval, Pandamaran	Hong Kong by 38 runs
T20I 4201	14 October	Maldives	Saudi Arabia	UKM-YSD Cricket Oval, Bangi	Saudi Arabia by 125 runs

=== 2026 ECA Women's European Cup ===
Pos	Team	Pld	W	L	NR	Pts	NRR
1	Sweden	3	3	0	0	6	8.014
2	Austria	3	2	1	0	4	1.056
3	Bulgaria	3	1	2	0	2	−3.605
4	Romania	3	0	3	0	0	−3.583

Source: Cricinfo

Round-robin
No.	Date	Team 1	Team 2	Venue	Result
WT20I 3032	15 October	Austria	Sweden	Moara Vlasei Cricket Ground, Ilfov County	Sweden by 9 wickets
WT20I 3033	15 October	Bulgaria	Sweden	Moara Vlasei Cricket Ground, Ilfov County	Sweden by 10 wickets
WT20I 3034	16 October	Romania	Bulgaria	Moara Vlasei Cricket Ground, Ilfov County	Bulgaria by 2 wickets
WT20I 3035	16 October	Austria	Bulgaria	Moara Vlasei Cricket Ground, Ilfov County	Austria by 10 wickets (DLS)
WT20I 3037	17 October	Romania	Austria	Moara Vlasei Cricket Ground, Ilfov County	Austria by 7 wickets
WT20I 3038	17 October	Romania	Sweden	Moara Vlasei Cricket Ground, Ilfov County	Sweden by 10 wickets
3rd-place play-off
WT20I 3041	18 October	Romania	Bulgaria	Moara Vlasei Cricket Ground, Ilfov County	Bulgaria by 5 wickets
Final
WT20I 3039	18 October	Austria	Sweden	Moara Vlasei Cricket Ground, Ilfov County	Sweden by 64 runs

=== 2026 Men's T20 World Cup Africa Sub-regional Qualifier C ===
Qualifier C standings
Pos	Team	Pld	W	L	NR	Pts	NRR	Qualification
1	Nigeria	5	5	0	0	10	4.610	Advanced to the regional final
2	Uganda	5	4	1	0	8	4.874	Advanced to the regional final
3	Zambia	5	2	3	0	4	0.101	
4	Mozambique	5	2	3	0	4	−2.731	
5	Lesotho	5	1	4	0	2	−1.371	
6	Gambia	5	1	4	0	2	−4.242	

Source: Cricinfo

Round-robin
No.	Date	Team 1	Team 2	Venue	Result
T20I 4204	20 October	Uganda	Zambia	Nigeria Cricket Federation Oval 1, Abuja	Uganda by 87 runs
T20I 4205	20 October	Lesotho	Mozambique	Nigeria Cricket Federation Oval 1, Abuja	Lesotho by 74 runs
T20I 4206	20 October	Nigeria	Gambia	Nigeria Cricket Federation Oval 2, Abuja	Nigeria by 160 runs
T20I 4207	21 October	Gambia	Mozambique	Nigeria Cricket Federation Oval 1, Abuja	Mozambique by 28 runs
T20I 4208	21 October	Lesotho	Uganda	Nigeria Cricket Federation Oval 2, Abuja	Uganda by 5 wickets
T20I 4209	21 October	Nigeria	Zambia	Nigeria Cricket Federation Oval 1, Abuja	Nigeria by 9 wickets
T20I 4211	23 October	Nigeria	Mozambique	Nigeria Cricket Federation Oval 1, Abuja	Nigeria by 7 wickets
T20I 4212	23 October	Lesotho	Zambia	Nigeria Cricket Federation Oval 2, Abuja	Zambia by 7 wickets
T20I 4213	23 October	Gambia	Uganda	Nigeria Cricket Federation Oval 2, Abuja	Uganda by 10 wickets
T20I 4215	24 October	Mozambique	Uganda	Nigeria Cricket Federation Oval 2, Abuja	Uganda by 10 wickets
T20I 4216	24 October	Gambia	Zambia	Nigeria Cricket Federation Oval 1, Abuja	Zambia by 8 wickets
T20I 4217	24 October	Nigeria	Lesotho	Nigeria Cricket Federation Oval 2, Abuja	Nigeria by 7 wickets
T20I 4218	25 October	Gambia	Lesotho	Nigeria Cricket Federation Oval 1, Abuja	Gambia by 3 runs
T20I 4219	25 October	Mozambique	Zambia	Nigeria Cricket Federation Oval 2, Abuja	Mozambique by 3 wickets
T20I 4220	25 October	Nigeria	Uganda	Nigeria Cricket Federation Oval 1, Abuja	Nigeria by 1 run

=== Argentina women in Mexico ===
WT20I series
No.	Date	Venue	Result
WT20I 3046	24 October	Texcoco Municipal Baseball Complex, Texcoco de Mora	Argentina by 223 runs
WT20I 3047	24 October	Texcoco Municipal Baseball Complex, Texcoco de Mora	Argentina by 165 runs
WT20I 3048	25 October	Texcoco Municipal Baseball Complex, Texcoco de Mora	Argentina by 135 runs

== November ==
=== 2026 Victoria Series ===
Pos	Team	Pld	W	L	NR	Pts	NRR
1	Uganda	6	4	2	0	8	0.203
2	Rwanda	6	4	2	0	8	0.073
3	Namibia	6	3	3	0	6	0.234
4	United States	6	1	5	0	2	−0.518

Source: Cricinfo

Round-robin
No.	Date	Team 1	Team 2	Venue	Result
WT20I 3049	6 November	Uganda	Namibia	Entebbe Cricket Oval, Entebbe	Uganda by 4 wickets
WT20I 3050	6 November	Rwanda	United States	Entebbe Cricket Oval, Entebbe	Rwanda by 14 runs
WT20I 3051	7 November	Namibia	United States	Entebbe Cricket Oval, Entebbe	Namibia by 8 runs
WT20I 3052	7 November	Uganda	Rwanda	Entebbe Cricket Oval, Entebbe	Uganda by 6 runs
WT20I 3053	8 November	Namibia	Rwanda	Entebbe Cricket Oval, Entebbe	Namibia by 39 runs
WT20I 3054	8 November	Uganda	United States	Entebbe Cricket Oval, Entebbe	Uganda by 7 wickets
WT20I 3055	10 November	Rwanda	United States	Entebbe Cricket Oval, Entebbe	Rwanda by 2 runs
WT20I 3056	10 November	Uganda	Namibia	Entebbe Cricket Oval, Entebbe	Namibia by 4 runs
WT20I 3057	11 November	Uganda	Rwanda	Entebbe Cricket Oval, Entebbe	Rwanda by 18 runs
WT20I 3058	11 November	Namibia	United States	Entebbe Cricket Oval, Entebbe	United States by 1 wicket
WT20I 3061	12 November	Uganda	United States	Entebbe Cricket Oval, Entebbe	Uganda by 14 runs
WT20I 3064	12 November	Namibia	Rwanda	Entebbe Cricket Oval, Entebbe	Rwanda by 4 wickets
3rd-place play-off
WT20I 3069	14 November	Namibia	United States	Entebbe Cricket Oval, Entebbe	United States by 28 runs
Final
WT20I 3070	14 November	Uganda	Rwanda	Entebbe Cricket Oval, Entebbe	Uganda by 19 runs

=== Costa Rica in Falkland Islands ===
T20I series
No.	Date	Venue	Result
T20I 4227	15 November	Platinum Oval, Stanley	Falkland Islands by 7 wickets
T20I 4228	15 November	Platinum Oval, Stanley	Falkland Islands by 9 wickets
T20I 4229	16 November	Platinum Oval, Stanley	Falkland Islands by 7 wickets
T20I 4230	16 November	Platinum Oval, Stanley	Costa Rica by 2 wickets
T20I 4231	17 November	Platinum Oval, Stanley	Falkland Islands by 6 wickets
T20I 4232	17 November	Platinum Oval, Stanley	Falkland Islands by 78 runs
T20I 4233	18 November	Platinum Oval, Stanley	Costa Rica by 10 runs
T20I 4234	18 November	Platinum Oval, Stanley	Falkland Islands by 7 wickets

=== 2026 Malaysia Women's Tri-Nation Series ===
Pos	Team	Pld	W	L	NR	Pts	NRR
1	Indonesia	2	2	0	0	4	0.305
2	Malaysia	2	1	1	0	2	0.021
3	China	2	0	2	0	0	−0.350

Updated to match(es) played on 22 November 2026. Source: Cricinfo

Round-robin
No.	Date	Team 1	Team 2	Venue	Result
WT20I 3083	20 November	Malaysia	Indonesia	Bayuemas Oval, Pandamaran	Indonesia by 7 wickets
WT20I 3087	21 November	China	Indonesia	Bayuemas Oval, Pandamaran	Indonesia by 3 runs
WT20I 3088	22 November	Malaysia	China	Bayuemas Oval, Pandamaran	Malaysia by 6 wickets
WT20I 3092	23 November	Malaysia	Indonesia	Bayuemas Oval, Pandamaran	
WT20I 3096	24 November	China	Indonesia	Bayuemas Oval, Pandamaran	
WT20I 3097	25 November	Malaysia	China	Bayuemas Oval, Pandamaran	
Final
WT20I 3099	27 November	TBD	TBD	Bayuemas Oval, Pandamaran	

== December ==
=== 2026 Gelephu Men's T20I Series ===
Pos	Team	Pld	W	L	NR	Pts	NRR
1	Bahrain	0	0	0	0	0	—
2	Bhutan	0	0	0	0	0	—
3	Maldives	0	0	0	0	0	—
4	Nepal A	0	0	0	0	0	—
5	Thailand	0	0	0	0	0	—

First match(es) will be played: 4 December 2026. Source:

=== Mali in Gambia ===
T20I series
No.	Date	Venue	Result
1st T20I	12 December	MRC Cricket Oval, Serekunda	
2nd T20I	13 December	MRC Cricket Oval, Serekunda	
3rd T20I	15 December	MRC Cricket Oval, Serekunda	
4th T20I	16 December	MRC Cricket Oval, Serekunda	
5th T20I	17 December	MRC Cricket Oval, Serekunda	

=== 2026 Gelephu Men's T20I Tri-Nation Series ===
Pos	Team	Pld	W	L	NR	Pts	NRR
1	Bahrain	0	0	0	0	0	—
2	Bhutan	0	0	0	0	0	—
3	Maldives	0	0	0	0	0	—

First match(es) will be played: 15 December 2026. Source:

=== Maldives in Bhutan ===
T20I series
No.	Date	Venue	Result
1st T20I	26 December	Gelephu International Cricket Ground, Gelephu	
2nd T20I	27 December	Gelephu International Cricket Ground, Gelephu	
3rd T20I	28 December	Gelephu International Cricket Ground, Gelephu	
4th T20I	29 December	Gelephu International Cricket Ground, Gelephu	
5th T20I	30 December	Gelephu International Cricket Ground, Gelephu	

== January ==
=== Falkland Islands women in Saint Helena ===
WT20I series
No.	Date	Venue	Result
1st WT20I	6 January	Francis Plain Playing Field, Francis Plain	
2nd WT20I	7 January	Francis Plain Playing Field, Francis Plain	
3rd WT20I	9 January	Francis Plain Playing Field, Francis Plain	
4th WT20I	10 January	Francis Plain Playing Field, Francis Plain	
5th WT20I	11 January	Francis Plain Playing Field, Francis Plain	

=== 2027 Lotus Women's Cup ===
Pos	Team	Pld	W	L	NR	Pts	NRR
1	Bhutan	0	0	0	0	0	—
2	Hong Kong	0	0	0	0	0	—
3	Indonesia	0	0	0	0	0	—
4	Nepal	0	0	0	0	0	—

First match(es) will be played: 13 January 2027. Source:

Round-robin
No.	Date	Team 1	Team 2	Venue	Result
1st WT20I	13 January	TBD	TBD	Gelephu International Cricket Ground, Gelephu	
2nd WT20I	14 January	TBD	TBD	Gelephu International Cricket Ground, Gelephu	
3rd WT20I	15 January	TBD	TBD	Gelephu International Cricket Ground, Gelephu	
4th WT20I	16 January	TBD	TBD	Gelephu International Cricket Ground, Gelephu	
5th WT20I	17 January	TBD	TBD	Gelephu International Cricket Ground, Gelephu	
6th WT20I	18 January	TBD	TBD	Gelephu International Cricket Ground, Gelephu	
Final
7th WT20I	19 January	TBD	TBD	Gelephu International Cricket Ground, Gelephu	

=== 2027 Mindful Women's Cup ===
Pos	Team	Pld	W	L	NR	Pts	NRR
1	Bhutan	0	0	0	0	0	—
2	Indonesia	0	0	0	0	0	—
3	Japan	0	0	0	0	0	—
4	Oman	0	0	0	0	0	—

First match(es) will be played: 22 January 2027. Source:

Round-robin
No.	Date	Team 1	Team 2	Venue	Result
1st WT20I	22 January	TBD	TBD	Gelephu International Cricket Ground, Gelephu	
2nd WT20I	23 January	TBD	TBD	Gelephu International Cricket Ground, Gelephu	
3rd WT20I	24 January	TBD	TBD	Gelephu International Cricket Ground, Gelephu	
4th WT20I	25 January	TBD	TBD	Gelephu International Cricket Ground, Gelephu	
5th WT20I	26 January	TBD	TBD	Gelephu International Cricket Ground, Gelephu	
6th WT20I	27 January	TBD	TBD	Gelephu International Cricket Ground, Gelephu	
Final
7th WT20I	28 January	TBD	TBD	Gelephu International Cricket Ground, Gelephu	

=== Oman women in Bhutan ===
WT20I series
No.	Date	Venue	Result
1st WT20I	30 January	Gelephu International Cricket Ground, Gelephu	
2nd WT20I	1 February	Gelephu International Cricket Ground, Gelephu	
3rd WT20I	2 February	Gelephu International Cricket Ground, Gelephu	

== See also ==
- International cricket in 2026–27
- Associate international cricket in 2026
- Associate international cricket in 2027
