= Bangladeshi cricket team against Afghanistan in the UAE in 2026–27 =

International cricket tour

	Afghanistan	Bangladesh
- Dates: 9 – 13 October 2026
Captains	Rahmat Shah	Najmul Hossain Shanto

Test series
- Result: 1-match series drawn 0–0
Most runs	Rahmat Shah (156)	Litton Das (155)
Most wickets	Mohammad Saleem (6)	Ebadot Hossain (7)

The Bangladesh cricket team toured the United Arab Emirates in October 2026 to play against Afghanistan cricket team. The tour consisted of only one Test. In September 2026, the Afghanistan Cricket Board (ACB) confirmed the fixtures for the tour.

== Squads ==
Afghanistan	Bangladesh
Rahmat Shah (c); Ikram Alikhil (vc, wk); Afsar Zazai (wk); Sediqullah Atal; Abdul Malik; Hashmatullah Shahidi; Rahmanullah Gurbaz; Shahidullah Kamal; Ismat Alam; Qais Ahmad; Zia-ur-Rehman; Khalil Gurbaz; Mohammad Saleem; Ziaur Rahman; Yamin Ahmadzai	Najmul Hossain Shanto (c); Khaled Ahmed; Jaker Ali; Litton Das (wk); Mominul Haque; Tanzid Hasan; Ebadot Hossain; Tawhid Hridoy; Shadman Islam; Shoriful Islam; Taijul Islam; Hasan Mahmud; Mehidy Hasan Miraz; Mushfiqur Rahim; Soumya Sarkar

== Only Test ==
9–13 October 2026
Scorecard

Bangladesh	v	Afghanistan
346 (92.3 overs); Tanzid Hasan 83 (71); Mohammad Saleem 4/82 (23 overs)		240 (89.1 overs); Rahmat Shah 105* (216); Hasan Mahmud 5/55 (21 overs)
372/7d (105.2 overs); Litton Das 102 (117); Mohammad Saleem 2/69 (19.2 overs)		346/8 (142 overs); Sediqullah Atal 111 (332); Ebadot Hossain 3/50 (21 overs)

Match drawn
Sheikh Zayed Cricket Stadium, Abu Dhabi
Umpires: Allahuddien Paleker (SA) and Ahsan Raza (Pak)
Player of the match: Litton Das (Ban)

- Bangladesh won the toss and elected to bat.
- Hasan Mahmud (Ban) took his maiden test hat-trick, becoming the first Bangladeshi pacer to achieve this feat.
- Ebadot Hossain (Ban) took his 50th Test wicket.
- Sediqullah Atal (Afg) scored his maiden century in Tests.
- Litton Das (Ban) became the first player in Tests to score a century and a half-century alongside making 9 dismissals in a single match.

== See also ==
- 2026 Afghanistan Tri-Nation Series
