= International cricket in 2031 =

International cricket season

The 2031 International cricket season will take place from April 2031 to September 2031. This calendar includes men's Test, men's ODI, men's T20I, women's Test, women's ODI and women's T20I matches mainly involving full member teams, as well as some other significant series. In addition to the matches shown here, a number of other T20I series involving associate nations are being played during this period.

The Finals of 2029–2031 World Test Championship will take place in England in June 2031.

== Season overview ==
=== Men's events ===
International tours
Start date	Home team	Away team	Results [Matches]		
Start date	Home team	Away team	Test	ODI	T20I
			—N/a	—N/a	—N/a
International tournaments
Start date	Tournament				Winners
12 June 2031	(England) 2029–2031 World Test Championship				

=== Women's events ===
Women's international tours
Start date	Home team	Away team	Results [Matches]		
Start date	Home team	Away team	Test	ODI	T20I

== See also ==
- International cricket in 2030–31
- International cricket in 2031–32
