= Falkland Islands national cricket team =

Falkland Islands
- Association: Falkland Cricket Association

Personnel
- Captain: Cecil Alexander

International Cricket Council
- ICC status: Associate member (2017)
- ICC region: Americas

International cricket
- First international: Chile in Santiago; February 2004

T20 Internationals
- First T20I: v. Costa Rica at Los Reyes Polo Club, Guácima; 10 March 2025
- Last T20I: v. Costa Rica at Platinum Oval, Stanley; 18 November 2026
T20Is	Played	Won/Lost
Total	14	7/7 (0 ties, 0 no results)
This year	8	6/2 (0 ties, 0 no results)
- As of 18 November 2026

The Falkland Islands national cricket team represents the British overseas territory of the Falkland Islands in international cricket.

The team is organised by the Falkland Cricket Association, which became an affiliate member of the International Cricket Council (ICC) on 29 June 2007 (Argentina abstained from the vote admitting it as a member) and became an associate member in 2017. The Falkland Islands played its first international match in February 2004, playing against Chile in Santiago. The team did not make its debut in an ICC-sanctioned tournament until June 2010, when it took part in the 2010 Americas Championship Division Four event in Mexico. The following year, the Falklands played in the 2011 Americas Twenty20 Division Three tournament in Costa Rica, losing all five of its matches. The territory had only a single cricket pitch, located on Mount Pleasant Airfield Oval, which hampered the national team's ability to participate internationally. A second venue was later created in the capital Stanley.

In April 2018, the ICC decided to grant full Twenty20 International (T20I) status to all its members. Therefore, all Twenty20 matches played between the Falkland Islands and other ICC members after 1 January 2019 have the T20I status.

== Records ==
International Match Summary — Falkland Islands

Last updated 18 November 2026

Playing Record
Format	M	W	L	T	NR	Inaugural Match
Twenty20 Internationals	14	7	7	0	0	10 March 2025

=== Twenty20 International ===
T20I record versus other nations

Records complete to T20I #4234. Last updated 18 November 2025.

Opponent	M	W	L	T	NR	First match	First win
vs Associate Members
Costa Rica	14	7	7	0	0	10 March 2025	12 March 2025

== Grounds ==
Locations of all stadiums which have hosted an international cricket match within Falkland Islands

== See also ==
- List of Falkland Islands Twenty20 International cricketers
