= 2011 Americas Twenty20 Division Three =

2011 ICC World Cricket League Americas Region Twenty20 Division Three
- Administrator: International Cricket Council
- Cricket format: Twenty20
- Tournament format: Round-robin
- Host: Costa Rica
- Champions: Belize
- Participants: 6
- Matches: 15
- Most runs: (Chile) John Fecci (154)
- Most wickets: (Belize) Keve Flowers (12)
- Official website: ICC Americas Region

The 2011 ICC World Cricket League Americas Region Twenty20 Division Three is a cricket tournament that took place between 14 and 18 March 2011. Costa Rica hosted the event.

== Teams ==
Teams that qualified are as follows:

- Belize
- Chile
- Costa Rica
- Falkland Islands
- Mexico
- Peru

== Fixtures ==
=== Points Table ===
Team	P	W	L	T	NR	Points	NRR
Belize	5	5	0	0	0	10	+3.392
Peru	5	4	1	0	0	8	+1.794
Chile	5	3	2	0	0	6	–0.108
Mexico	5	2	3	0	0	4	+1.006
Costa Rica	5	1	4	0	0	2	–1.542
Falkland Islands	5	0	5	0	0	0	–4.373

=== Matches ===
14 March
3.30 p.m.
Scorecard

Peru; 64/9 (20 overs)	v	Belize; 65/6 (13.5 overs)
Nicholas Appleyard 15 (32); Howell Gillett 4/14 (3 overs)		Conway Young 18 (18); Miles Buesst 2/13 (4 overs)

Belize won by 4 wickets
Ground 1, Los Reyes Polo Club, Campo Ayala North
Umpires: Ruban Sivanadian (Can) and K. Gibbons (Ber)
Player of the match: Howell Gillett (Biz)

- Peru won the toss and elected to bat.

14 March
3.30 p.m.
Scorecard

Costa Rica; 123/7 (20 overs)	v	Chile; 124/9 (19.4 overs)
Julian Olivier 50 (43); Pablo Meijas 2/11 (4 overs)		John Fecci 63 (54); Tim Baker 2/28 (4 overs)

Chile won by 5 wickets
Ground 2, Los Reyes Polo Club, Campo Ayala South
Umpires: K. Shanthikumar (Can) and D. Gibson (Arg)
Player of the match: John Fecci (Chi)

- Costa Rica won the toss and elected to bat.

14 March
8.00 p.m.
Scorecard

Belize; 182/5 (20 overs)	v	Falkland Islands; 50 (15.1 overs)
Warren Anthony 50* (31); Kevin Clapp 2/23 (4 overs)		David Pickup 10 (14); Mykelt Anthony 5/4 (3.1 overs)

Belize won by 132 runs
Ground 1, Los Reyes Polo Club, Campo Ayala North
Umpires: Sydney Moore (Cay) and Ruban Sivanadian (Can)
Player of the match: Mykelt Anthony (Biz)

- Belize won the toss and elected to bat.

14 March
8.00 p.m.
Scorecard

Peru; 88/8 (20 overs)	v	Chile; 48 (16.3 overs)
Mike Soulsby 50 (63); Tristan Bradbrook 2/14 (4 overs)		John Fecci 10 (14); Anthony Sanford 3/8 (4 overs)

Peru won by 40 runs
Ground 2, Los Reyes Polo Club, Campo Ayala South
Umpires: L. Bailey (Cay) and K. Shanthikumar (Can)
Player of the match: Mike Soulsby (Per)

- Peru won the toss and elected to bat.

15 March
3.30 p.m.
Scorecard

Falkland Islands; 58 (19.2 overs)	v	Mexico; 59/0 (9.4 overs)
Martin Collins 15 (22); Michael Linnecar 3/8 (4 overs)		Tushar Gupta 28* (28)

Mexico won by 10 wickets
Ground 1, Los Reyes Polo Club, Campo Ayala North
Umpires: K. Gibbons (Ber) and L. Bailey (Cay)
Player of the match: Michael Linnecar (Mex)

- Mexico won the toss and elected to field

15 March
8.00 p.m.
Scorecard

Mexico; 106/7 (20 overs)	v	Chile; 107/6 (18.2 overs)
Yasir Patel 26 (42); Tristan Bradbrook 1/19 (4 overs)		Russell Perryman 23* (28); Tushar Gipta 3/29 (4 overs)

Chile won by 4 wickets
Ground 1, Los Reyes Polo Club, Campo Ayala North
Umpires: D. Gibson (Arg) and K. Shanthikumar (Can)
Player of the match: Russell Perryman (Chi)

- Mexico won the toss and elected to bat.

15 March
8.00 p.m.
Scorecard

Costa Rica; 140/2 (20 overs)	v	Falkland Islands; 75 (19.2 overs)
Shane Catford 87* (65); Craig Paice 1/11 (2 overs)		Jonathon Gunther 17 (31); Ben Smith 3/12 (4 overs)

Costa Rica won by 65 runs
Ground 2, Los Reyes Polo Club, Campo Ayala South
Umpires: Sydney Moore (Cay) and Ruban Sivanadian (Can)
Player of the match: Shane Catford (CR)

- Costa Rica won the toss and elected to bat.

16 March
3.30 p.m.
Scorecard

Peru; 98/6 (20 overs)	v	Costa Rica; 67 (19.3 overs)
Miles Buesst 26 (29); Ben Smith 2/6 (4 overs)		Chris Prasad 30 (48); Diresh Ekanayake 2/9 (3.3 overs)

Peru won by 31 runs
Ground 1, Los Reyes Polo Club, Campo Ayala North
Umpires: L. Bailey (Cay) and K. Gibbons (Ber)
Player of the match: Diresh Ekanayake (Per)

- Peru won the toss and elected to bat.

16 March
8.00 p.m.
Scorecard

Falkland Islands; 71/8 (20 overs)	v	Chile; 72/1 (11.3 overs)
Martin Collins 25* (35); Criatian Eyzaguirre 2/12 (2 overs)		John Fecci 44 (43); Craig Paice 1/12 (1 overs)

Chile won by 9 wickets
Ground 1, Los Reyes Polo Club, Campo Ayala North
Umpires: Stephen Moore (Cay) and L. Bailey (Cay)
Player of the match: John Fecci (Chi)

- Falkland Islands won the toss and elected to bat.

16 March
8.00 p.m.
Scorecard

Belize; 106/8 (20 overs)	v	Mexico; 87/9 (20 overs)
Dirk Sutherland 27* (20); Tushar Gupta 3/10 (4 overs)		Yasir Patel 35 (58); Keve Flowers 3/12 (3 overs)

Belize won by 19 runs
Ground 2, Los Reyes Polo Club, Campo Ayala South
Umpires: Ruban Sivanadian (Can) and K. Shanthikumar (Can)
Player of the match: Keve Flowers (Biz)

- Mexico won the toss and elected to field.

17 March
3.30 p.m.
Scorecard

Mexico; 49 (15.3 overs)	v	Peru; 50/1 (15.2 overs)
Huge Van Belle 16 (14); Anthony Sanford 2/11 (4 overs)		Chris Abbott 25* (47); Michael Linnecar 1/5 (4 overs)

Peru won by 9 wickets
Ground 1, Los Reyes Polo Club, Campo Ayala North
Umpires: Sydney Moore (Cay) and Ruban Sivanadian (Can)
Player of the match: Chris Abbott (Per)

- Mexico won the toss and elected to bat.

17 March
3.30 p.m.
Scorecard

Costa Rica; 39 (18 overs)	v	Belize; 40/3 (4 overs)
Julian Olivier 8 (20); Keve Flowers 4/6 (4 overs)		Conway Young 15 (7); Ben Smith 2/19 (2 overs)

Belize won by 7 wickets
Ground 2, Los Reyes Polo Club, Campo Ayala South
Umpires: K. Shanthikumar (Can) and L. Bailey (Cay)
Player of the match: Keve Flowers (Biz)

- Costa Rica won the toss and elected to bat.

17 March
8.00 p.m.
Scorecard

Peru; 126/3 (20 overs)	v	Falkland Islands; 22 (10.3 overs)
Nicolas Appleyard 35 (35); David Pickup 1/20 (4 overs); Kevin Clapp 1/20 (4 overs)		Kevin Clapp 7 (6); Suresh Kumar 3/7 (3 overs)

Peru won by 104 runs
Ground 1, Los Reyes Polo Club, Campo Ayala North
Umpires: K. Gibbons (Ber) and Ruban Sivandian (Can)
Player of the match: Sureash Kumar (Per)

- Peru won the toss and elected to bat.

18 March
3.30 p.m.
Scorecard

Chile; 85/7 (20 overs)	v	Belize; 90/5 (16 overs)
John Fecci 21 (27); Dirk Sutherland 2/12 (4 overs)		Mykelt Anthony 34* (20); Tristran Bradbrook 1/8 (4 overs)

Belize won by 5 wickets
Ground 1, Los Reyes Polo Club, Campo Ayala North
Umpires: Ruban Sivanadian (Can) and K. Shanthikumar (Can)
Player of the match: Mykelt Anthony (Biz)

- Chile won the toss and elected to bat.

18 March
3.30 p.m.
Scorecard

Mexico; 130/5 (20 overs)	v	Costa Rica; 35 (8.1 overs)
Kaushal Ahuja 37 (42); Sam Arthur 3/27 (4 overs)		Ben Smith 15 (6); Yasir Patel 5/16 (4 overs)

Mexico won by 95 runs
Ground 2, Los Reyes Polo Club, Campo Ayala South
Umpires: K. Gibbons (Ber) and D. Gibson (Arg)
Player of the match: Yasir Patel (Mex)

- Mexico won the toss and elected to bat.

== Statistics ==
=== Most runs ===
The top five highest run scorers (total runs) are included in this table.

Player	Team	Runs
John Fecci	Chile	154
Conway Young	Belize	122
Shane Catford	Costa Rica	109
Michael Soulsby	Peru	107
Yasir Patel	Mexico	98

=== Most wickets ===
The following table contains the five leading wicket-takers.

Player	Team	Wkts
Keve Flowers	Belize	12
Tushar Gupta	Mexico	11
Dirk Sutherland	Belize	10
Dinesh Ekanayake	Peru	9
Mykelt Anthony	Belize	8

== See also ==
- 2012 ICC World Twenty20 Qualifier
