= International cricket in 2029–30 =

International cricket season

The 2029–2030 International cricket season will take place from September 2029 to March 2030. This calendar will include men's Test, men's One Day International (ODI), men's Twenty20 International (T20I), women's Test, women's One Day International (ODI) and women's Twenty20 International (T20I) matches, as well as some other significant series. In addition to the matches shown here, a number of other T20I series involving associate nations will be played during this period.

The 2029 ICC Champions Trophy will take place in India in October.

== Season overview ==
=== Men's events ===
International tours
Start date	Home team	Away team	Results [Matches]		
Start date	Home team	Away team	Test	ODI	T20I
International tournaments
Start date	Tournament				Winners
9 October 2029	(India) 2029 ICC Champions Trophy				

=== Women's events ===
International tours
Start date	Home team	Away team	Results [Matches]		
Start date	Home team	Away team	WTest	WODI	WT20I

== See also ==
- International cricket in 2029
