= 2010 ICC Americas Championship Division Four =

- Administrator: ICC Americas
- Cricket format: 50 overs per side
- Host: Mexico
- Participants: 3
- Matches: 3

The 2010 ICC Americas Championship Division Four was a cricket tournament held in Mexico City, Mexico, from 14 to 16 June 2010. It gave three Affiliate members of the International Cricket Council from the Americas region experience of international one-day cricket and formed part of the global World Cricket League structure. Following on from the 50-over tournament, the three teams played a Twenty20 tournament which ran from 17 to 18 June 2010.

== Teams ==
There were three teams participating in the tournament. These teams are non-Test members of the ICC Americas region. The teams are:

- Costa Rica
- Falkland Islands
- Mexico

Note: The tournament was set to have four teams, but Cuba "declined the invitation due to travel restrictions by their authorities," ICC Americas Development Manager, Martin Viera, advised CricInfo.

== Group stage ==
=== Points Table ===
Group Table
Team	P	W	L	T	NR	NRR	Points
Mexico	2	2	0	0	0	+2.867	4
Falkland Islands	2	1	1	0	0	-1.720	2
Costa Rica	2	0	2	0	0	-0.954	0

Team wins and gets promoted to Division 3

=== Fixtures ===
14 June 2010
(scorecard)

Costa Rica; 186 all out (46.5 overs)	v	Mexico; 187/7 (35.1 overs)
Ben Smith 104 (127); Tushar Gupta 5/32 (9.5 overs)		Tarun Sharma 45 (59); Tim Baker 3/43 (10 overs)

Mexico won by 3 wickets
Reforma Athletic Club, Naucalpan
Umpires: A. Nasrullah & K. Patel
Player of the match: Ben Smith (Costa Rica)

15 June 2010
(scorecard)

Falkland Islands; 131 all out (38.3 overs)	v	Costa Rica; 92 all out (28.5 overs)
David Pickup 24 (53); Ben Smith 4/32 (10 overs)		Ben Smith 24 (27); Elliott Taylforth 6/14 (8.5 overs)

Falkland Islands won by 39 runs
Reforma Athletic Club, Naucalpan
Umpires: C. Banner & A. Nasrullah
Player of the match: Elliott Taylforth (Falkland Islands)

16 June 2010
(scorecard)

Mexico; 242 all out (44 overs)	v	Falkland Islands; 31 all out (19 overs)
Tarun Sharma 72 (104); Kevin Clapp 5/34 (6 overs)		Martin Collins 8 (53); Tushar Gupta 6/13 (9 overs)

Mexico won by 211 runs
Reforma Athletic Club, Naucalpan
Umpires: C. Banner & K. Patel
Player of the match: Tushar Gupta (Mexico)

== Twenty20 matches ==
17 June 2010
(scorecard)

Mexico; 130/8 (20 overs)	v	Falkland Islands; 101/9 (20 overs)
Tushar Gupta 57* (43); David Hewitt 3/15 (4 overs)		Martin Collins 22 (29); Rishi Taneja 4/15 (4 overs)

Mexico won by 29 runs
Reforma Athletic Club, Naucalpan
Umpires: K. Patel & C. Banner
