= International cricket in 2028 =

International cricket season

The 2028 International cricket season will take place from April 2028 to September 2028. This calendar includes men's Test, men's ODI, men's T20I, women's Test, women's ODI and women's T20I matches mainly involving full member teams, as well as some other significant series.

This season will mark cricket's return to the Olympics after 128 years.

== Season overview ==
=== Men's events ===
International tours
Start date	Home team	Away team	Results [Matches]		
Start date	Home team	Away team	Test	ODI	T20I
			—N/a	—N/a	—N/a
International tournaments
Start date	Tournament				Winners
12 July 2028	(United States) 2028 Summer Olympics				

=== Women's events ===
International tours
Start date	Home team	Away team	Results [Matches]		
Start date	Home team	Away team	Test	ODI	T20I
			—N/a	—N/a	—N/a
International tournaments
Start date	Tournament				Winners
22 July 2028	(United States) 2028 Summer Olympics				

== July ==
=== Summer Olympics ===
==== Men's tournament ====
Pos	Team	Pld	W	L	NR	Pts	NRR
1	United States	0	0	0	0	0	—
2	TBD	0	0	0	0	0	—
3	TBD	0	0	0	0	0	—
4	TBD	0	0	0	0	0	—
5	TBD	0	0	0	0	0	—
6	TBD	0	0	0	0	0	—

First match(es) will be played: 12 July 2028. Source:

First round
No.	Date	Team 1	Team 2	Venue	Result
1st T20I	12 July			Fairplex, Pomona	
2nd T20I	12 July			Fairplex, Pomona	
3rd T20I	13 July			Fairplex, Pomona	
4th T20I	13 July			Fairplex, Pomona	
5th T20I	15 July			Fairplex, Pomona	
6th T20I	15 July			Fairplex, Pomona	
Second round
No.	Date	Team 1	Team 2	Venue	Result
7th T20I	16 July			Fairplex, Pomona	
8th T20I	17 July			Fairplex, Pomona	
9th T20I	17 July			Fairplex, Pomona	
10th T20I	18 July			Fairplex, Pomona	
11th T20I	18 July			Fairplex, Pomona	
12th T20I	19 July			Fairplex, Pomona	
Play-offs
No.	Date	Team 1	Team 2	Venue	Result
Gold medal match	20 July			Fairplex, Pomona	
Bronze medal match	20 July			Fairplex, Pomona	

==== Women's tournament ====
Pos	Team	Pld	W	L	NR	Pts	NRR
1	TBD	0	0	0	0	0	—
2	TBD	0	0	0	0	0	—
3	TBD	0	0	0	0	0	—
4	TBD	0	0	0	0	0	—
5	TBD	0	0	0	0	0	—
6	TBD	0	0	0	0	0	—

First match(es) will be played: 22 July 2028. Source:

First round
No.	Date	Team 1	Team 2	Venue	Result
1st WT20I	22 July			Fairplex, Pomona	
2nd WT20I	22 July			Fairplex, Pomona	
3rd WT20I	23 July			Fairplex, Pomona	
4th WT20I	23 July			Fairplex, Pomona	
5th WT20I	24 July			Fairplex, Pomona	
6th WT20I	24 July			Fairplex, Pomona	
Second round
No.	Date	Team 1	Team 2	Venue	Result
7th WT20I	25 July			Fairplex, Pomona	
8th WT20I	26 July			Fairplex, Pomona	
9th WT20I	26 July			Fairplex, Pomona	
10th WT20I	27 July			Fairplex, Pomona	
11th WT20I	27 July			Fairplex, Pomona	
12th WT20I	28 July			Fairplex, Pomona	
Play-offs
No.	Date	Team 1	Team 2	Venue	Result
Gold medal match	29 July			Fairplex, Pomona	
Bronze medal match	29 July			Fairplex, Pomona	

== See also ==
- International cricket in 2027–28
- International cricket in 2028–29
