= International cricket in 2027–28 =

International cricket season

The 2027–28 International cricket season will take place from September 2027 to March 2028. This calendar will include men's Test, men's One Day International (ODI), men's Twenty20 International (T20I), women's Test, women's One Day International (ODI) and women's Twenty20 International (T20I) matches, as well as some other significant series. In addition to the matches shown on this page, a number of other T20I series involving associate nations will be played during this period.

The 2027 Cricket World Cup will take place jointly in South Africa, Zimbabwe and Namibia in October and November. The FTP for 2027 to 2031, which covers the macro level details of the series for four years/eight seasons, will be discussed in future ICC meeting to be held in Hong Kong in later part of 2026.

== Season overview ==
=== Men's events ===
International tours
Start date	Home team	Away team	Results [Matches]		
Start date	Home team	Away team	Test	ODI	T20I
17 December 2027	Australia	Pakistan	[3]	—N/a	—N/a
January 2028	Australia	Sri Lanka	[2]	—N/a	—N/a
January 2028	India	England	[5]	—N/a	—N/a
International tournaments
Start date	Tournament				Winners
2 October 2027	(South Africa) (Zimbabwe) (Namibia) 2027 ICC Cricket World Cup				
5 February 2028	(Bangladesh) 2028 Summer Olympics qualifier - Men's				

=== Women's events ===
International tours
Start date	Home team	Away team	Results [Matches]		
Start date	Home team	Away team	WTest	WODI	WT20I
International tournaments
Start date	Tournament				Winners
26 February 2028	(United States) 2028 Summer Olympics qualifier - Women's				

== October ==
=== Points table ===
Group A standings
Pos	Team	Pld	W	L	NR	Pts	NRR
1	Afghanistan	0	0	0	0	0	—
2	Australia	0	0	0	0	0	—
3	India	0	0	0	0	0	—
4	Pakistan	0	0	0	0	0	—
5	Zimbabwe (H)	0	0	0	0	0	—
6	To be determined	0	0	0	0	0	—

First match(es) will be played: 7 October 2027. Source:
(H) Host

Group B standings
Pos	Team	Pld	W	L	NR	Pts	NRR
1	Bangladesh	0	0	0	0	0	—
2	England	0	0	0	0	0	—
3	New Zealand	0	0	0	0	0	—
4	South Africa (H)	0	0	0	0	0	—
5	Sri Lanka	0	0	0	0	0	—
6	To be determined	0	0	0	0	0	—

First match(es) will be played: 8 October 2027. Source:
(H) Host

2027 Cricket World Cup
No.	Date	Team 1	Team 2	Venue	Result
Super Series
1st Match	2 October	TBD	TBD	Namibia Cricket Ground, Windhoek	
2nd Match	4 October	TBD	TBD	Namibia Cricket Ground, Windhoek	
3rd Match	6 October	TBD	TBD	Namibia Cricket Ground, Windhoek	
Group stage
1st Match	7 October	Australia	India	Newlands Cricket Ground, Cape Town	
2nd Match	8 October	Afghanistan	Pakistan	Centurion Park, Centurion	
3rd Match	8 October	Bangladesh	England	Namibia Cricket Ground, Windhoek	
4th Match	9 October	Zimbabwe	TBD	Queens Sports Club, Bulawayo	
5th Match	9 October	New Zealand	South Africa	Newlands Cricket Ground, Cape Town	
6th Match	10 October	India	Pakistan	Wanderers Stadium, Johannesburg	
7th Match	10 October	Sri Lanka	TBD	Namibia Cricket Ground, Windhoek	
8th Match	11 October	Afghanistan	Zimbabwe	Queens Sports Club, Bulawayo	
9th Match	12 October	Australia	TBD	Boland Park, Paarl	
10th Match	12 October	Bangladesh	New Zealand	Buffalo Park, KuGompo City	
11th Match	13 October	England	Sri Lanka	Namibia Cricket Ground, Windhoek	
12th Match	13 October	South Africa	TBD	Boland Park, Paarl	
13th Match	14 October	Afghanistan	India	Centurion Park, Centurion	
14th Match	15 October	Pakistan	TBD	Mangaung Oval, Bloemfontein	
15th Match	15 October	Australia	Zimbabwe	Harare Sports Club, Harare	
16th Match	16 October	Bangladesh	Sri Lanka	Kingsmead Cricket Ground, Durban	
17th Match	16 October	England	South Africa	St George's Park, Gqeberha	
18th Match	17 October	India	TBD	Mangaung Oval, Bloemfontein	
19th Match	17 October	New Zealand	TBD	Harare Sports Club, Harare	
20th Match	18 October	Afghanistan	Australia	Buffalo Park, KuGompo City	
21st Match	19 October	Pakistan	Zimbabwe	Harare Sports Club, Harare	
22nd Match	19 October	Bangladesh	South Africa	Kingsmead Cricket Ground, Durban	
23rd Match	20 October	New Zealand	Sri Lanka	Wanderers Stadium, Johannesburg	
24th Match	20 October	England	TBD	Harare Sports Club, Harare	
25th Match	21 October	Afghanistan	TBD	Buffalo Park, KuGompo City	
26th Match	22 October	Australia	Pakistan	Boland Park, Paarl	
27th Match	22 October	South Africa	Sri Lanka	Wanderers Stadium, Johannesburg	
28th Match	23 October	England	New Zealand	St George's Park, Gqeberha	
29th Match	23 October	Bangladesh	TBD	Centurion Park, Centurion	
30th Match	24 October	India	Zimbabwe	Mosi-oa-Tunya International Cricket Stadium, Victoria Falls	
Super 7
1st Match	25 October	TBD	TBD	Wanderers Stadium, Johannesburg	
2nd Match	26 October	TBD	TBD	St George's Park, Gqeberha	
3rd Match	27 October	TBD	TBD	Centurion Park, Centurion	
4th Match	28 October	TBD	TBD	Mosi-oa-Tunya International Cricket Stadium, Victoria Falls	
5th Match	29 October	TBD	TBD	Buffalo Park, KuGompo City	
6th Match	30 October	TBD	TBD	Mosi-oa-Tunya International Cricket Stadium, Victoria Falls	
7th Match	31 October	TBD	TBD	Wanderers Stadium, Johannesburg	
8th Match	1 November	TBD	TBD	Mosi-oa-Tunya International Cricket Stadium, Victoria Falls	
9th Match	2 November	TBD	TBD	Namibia Cricket Ground, Windhoek	
10th Match	3 November	TBD	TBD	Kingsmead Cricket Ground, Durban	
11th Match	4 November	TBD	TBD	Boland Park, Paarl	
12th Match	5 November	TBD	TBD	Kingsmead Cricket Ground, Durban	
13th Match	6 November	TBD	TBD	Mangaung Oval, Bloemfontein	
14th Match	7 November	TBD	TBD	Namibia Cricket Ground, Windhoek	
15th Match	8 November	TBD	TBD	Kingsmead Cricket Ground, Durban	
16th Match	9 November	TBD	TBD	St George's Park, Gqeberha	
17th Match	10 November	TBD	TBD	Mangaung Oval, Bloemfontein	
18th Match	11 November	TBD	TBD	St George's Park, Gqeberha	
19th Match	12 November	TBD	TBD	Namibia Cricket Ground, Windhoek	
20th Match	13 November	TBD	TBD	Mangaung Oval, Bloemfontein	
21st Match	14 November	TBD	TBD	Kingsmead Cricket Ground, Durban	
Semi-finals
Semi-final 1	17 November	TBD	TBD	Newlands Cricket Ground, Cape Town	
Semi-final 2	18 November	TBD	TBD	Centurion Park, Centurion	
Final
Final	21 November	TBD	TBD	Wanderers Stadium, Johannesburg	

== December ==
=== Pakistan in Australia ===
Test matches
No.	Date	Venue	Result
1st Test	17–21 December 2027	Adelaide Oval, Adelaide	
2nd Test	26–30 December 2027	Melbourne Cricket Ground, Melbourne	
3rd Test	4–8 January 2028	Sydney Cricket Ground, Sydney	

== See also ==
- International cricket in 2027
- International cricket in 2028
