= International cricket in 2026–27 =

International cricket season

The 2026–27 International cricket season is taking place from late September 2026 to March 2027. This calendar includes men's Test, men's One Day International (ODI), men's Twenty20 International (T20I), women's Test, women's One Day International (ODI) and women's Twenty20 International (T20I) matches, as well as some other significant series. In addition to the matches shown here, a number of other T20I series involving associate nations are being played during this period.

The inaugural 2027 ICC Women's Champions Trophy is scheduled to be held in India in February 2027.

Australia is scheduled to host a one-off day-night Test against England in March 2027 to celebrate 150 years of Test cricket.

== Season overview ==
=== Men's events ===
International tours
Start date	Home team	Away team	Results [Matches]		
Start date	Home team	Away team	Test	ODI	T20I
24 September 2026	South Africa	Australia	2–1 [3]	2–1 [3]	—N/a
27 September 2026	India	West Indies	—N/a	2–1 [3]	2–2 [5]
9 October 2026	(United Arab Emirates) Afghanistan	Bangladesh	0–0 [1]	—N/a	—N/a
9 October 2026	Pakistan	Sri Lanka	1–0 [2]	—N/a	2–1 [3]
22 October 2026	New Zealand	India	[2]	1–3 [5]	2–3 [5]
22 October 2026	Namibia	Ireland	—N/a	3–2 [5]	—N/a
27 October 2026	(United Arab Emirates) Afghanistan	Zimbabwe	0–1 [2]	—N/a	3–0 [3]
28 October 2026	Bangladesh	West Indies	0–1 [2]	—N/a	—N/a
13 November 2026	Australia	England	[1]	1–2 [3]	[5]
15 November 2026	South Africa	Bangladesh	[2]	[3]	[3]
9 December 2026	Australia	New Zealand	[4]	—N/a	—N/a
13 December 2026	India	Sri Lanka	—N/a	[3]	[3]
17 December 2026	South Africa	England	[3]	[3]	—N/a
3 January 2027	India	Zimbabwe	—N/a	[3]	—N/a
16 January 2027	New Zealand	Sri Lanka	[2]	[3]	[3]
21 January 2027	India	Australia	[5]	—N/a	—N/a
February 2027	West Indies	Afghanistan	[1]	[3]	[3]
February 2027	Bangladesh	England	[2]	—N/a	—N/a
February 2027	Sri Lanka	South Africa	[2]	—N/a	—N/a
March 2027	Afghanistan	Ireland	[1]	[3]	[3]
March 2027	Pakistan	New Zealand	[2]	—N/a	—N/a
26 March 2027	Nepal	Bangladesh	—N/a	—N/a	[3]
Men's international tournaments
Start date	Tournament				Winners
3 October 2026	2026 United States Tri-Nation Series (round 22)				—N/a
9 October 2026	2026 Oman Tri-Nation Series (round 23)				—N/a
17 October 2026	(United Arab Emirates) 2026 Afghanistan Tri-Nation Series				Afghanistan
18 October 2026	2026–27 Pakistan ODI Tri-Series				Pakistan
21 October 2026	(Kenya) 2026 Cricket World Cup Challenge League A				—N/a
25 October 2026	2026 United Arab Emirates Tri-Nation Series (round 24)				—N/a
5 November 2026	(Oman) 2026 ACC Under-19 Asia Cup				India
19 November 2026	(Qatar) 2026 Asia Cup Rising Stars				
4 December 2026	(Nepal) 2026 Cricket World Cup Qualifier Play-off				
22 February 2027	(South Africa) (Namibia) 2027 Cricket World Cup Qualifier				

=== Women's events ===
Women's international tours
Start date	Home team	Away team	Results [Matches]		
Start date	Home team	Away team	WTest	WODI	WT20I
24 September 2026	Zimbabwe	West Indies	—N/a	1–2 [3]	0–3 [3]
9 October 2026	Australia	Bangladesh	—N/a	3–0 [3]	—N/a
16 October 2026	India	Zimbabwe	—N/a	3–0 [3]	3–0 [3]
18 October 2026	Australia	New Zealand	—N/a	[3]	2–0 [3]
9 December 2026	South Africa	India	[1]	[3]	[3]
10 December 2026	New Zealand	Bangladesh	—N/a	[3]	[3]
15 December 2026	Sri Lanka	Australia	—N/a	[3]	—N/a
1 February 2027	Sri Lanka	England	—N/a	[3]	[3]
24 March 2027	South Africa	Australia	[1]	[3]	[3]
International tournaments
Start date	Tournament				Winners
12 November 2026	(United Arab Emirates) 2026 Women's Emerging Nations Trophy				
21 January 2027	(Bangladesh) (Nepal) 2027 Under-19 Women's T20 World Cup				
14 February 2027	(India) 2027 Women's Champions Trophy				

== September ==
=== West Indies women in Zimbabwe ===
2025–2029 ICC Women's Championship — WODI series
No.	Date	Venue	Result
WODI 1565	24 September	Harare Sports Club, Harare	West Indies by 99 runs
WODI 1566	27 September	Harare Sports Club, Harare	Zimbabwe by 4 wickets
WODI 1567	30 September	Harare Sports Club, Harare	West Indies by 91 runs
WT20I series
No.	Date	Venue	Result
WT20I 3029	3 October	Takashinga Cricket Club, Harare	West Indies by 8 wickets
WT20I 3030	5 October	Takashinga Cricket Club, Harare	West Indies by 8 wickets
WT20I 3031	7 October	Takashinga Cricket Club, Harare	West Indies by 8 wickets

=== Australia in South Africa ===
ODI series
No.	Date	Venue	Result
ODI 5017	24 September	Kingsmead Cricket Ground, Durban	South Africa by 67 runs
ODI 5019	27 September	Wanderers Stadium, Johannesburg	South Africa by 32 runs
ODI 5023	30 September	JB Marks Oval, Potchefstroom	Australia by 45 runs (DLS)
2025–2027 ICC World Test Championship – Test series
No.	Date	Venue	Result
Test 2637	9–13 October	Kingsmead Cricket Ground, Durban	Australia by 214 runs
Test 2638	18–22 October	St George's Park Cricket Ground, Gqeberha	South Africa by an innings and 31 runs
Test 2639	27–31 October	Newlands Cricket Ground, Cape Town	South Africa by 176 runs

=== West Indies in India ===
ODI series
No.	Date	Venue	Result
ODI 5020	27 September	Greenfield International Stadium, Thiruvananthapuram	India by 8 wickets
ODI 5022	30 September	Assam Cricket Association Stadium, Guwahati	India by 8 wickets
ODI 5024	3 October	Maharaja Yadavindra Singh International Cricket Stadium, New Chandigarh	West Indies by 5 wickets
T20I Series
No.	Date	Venue	Result
T20I 4166	6 October	Ekana Cricket Stadium, Lucknow	India by 8 wickets
T20I 4179	9 October	JSCA International Stadium Complex, Ranchi	West Indies by 6 wickets
T20I 4187	11 October	Holkar Stadium, Indore	India by 14 runs
T20I 4202	14 October	Rajiv Gandhi International Cricket Stadium, Hyderabad	West Indies by 24 runs
T20I 4203	17 October	M. Chinnaswamy Stadium, Bengaluru	No result

== October ==
=== 2026 United States Tri-Nation Series (round 22) ===
2024–2026 Cricket World Cup League 2 – Tri-series
No.	Date	Team 1	Team 2	Venue	Result
ODI 5025	3 October	Namibia	United Arab Emirates	Grand Prairie Stadium, Grand Prairie	No result
ODI 5026	5 October	United States	United Arab Emirates	Grand Prairie Stadium, Grand Prairie	United States by 6 wickets
ODI 5027	7 October	United States	Namibia	Grand Prairie Stadium, Grand Prairie	United States by 4 wickets
ODI 5029	9 October	Namibia	United Arab Emirates	Grand Prairie Stadium, Grand Prairie	Namibia by 8 wickets
ODI 5031	11 October	United States	United Arab Emirates	Grand Prairie Stadium, Grand Prairie	United States by 5 wickets
ODI 5033	13 October	United States	Namibia	Grand Prairie Stadium, Grand Prairie	Namibia by 6 wickets

=== Bangladesh women in Australia ===
2025–2029 ICC Women's Championship — WODI series
No.	Date	Venue	Result
WODI 1568	9 October	Allan Border Field, Brisbane	Australia by 7 wickets
WODI 1569	11 October	Allan Border Field, Brisbane	Australia by 9 wickets
WODI 1570	14 October	Allan Border Field, Brisbane	Australia by 8 wickets

=== Bangladesh against Afghanistan in the UAE ===
Only Test
No.	Date	Venue	Result
Test 2636	9–13 October	Sheikh Zayed Cricket Stadium, Abu Dhabi	Match drawn

=== 2026 Oman Tri-Nation Series (round 23) ===
2024–2026 Cricket World Cup League 2 – Tri-series
No.	Date	Team 1	Team 2	Venue	Result
ODI 5028	9 October	Oman	Canada	Oman Cricket Academy Ground Turf 1, Al Amarat	Oman by 41 runs
ODI 5030	11 October	Canada	Nepal	Oman Cricket Academy Ground Turf 1, Al Amarat	Nepal by 24 runs
ODI 5032	13 October	Oman	Nepal	Oman Cricket Academy Ground Turf 1, Al Amarat	Nepal by 113 runs
ODI 5034	15 October	Oman	Canada	Oman Cricket Academy Ground Turf 1, Al Amarat	Canada by 58 runs
ODI 5035	17 October	Canada	Nepal	Oman Cricket Academy Ground Turf 1, Al Amarat	Canada by 24 runs
ODI 5038	19 October	Oman	Nepal	Oman Cricket Academy Ground Turf 1, Al Amarat	Nepal by 10 runs

=== Sri Lanka in Pakistan ===
T20I series
No.	Date	Venue	Result
T20I 4180	9 October	Rawalpindi Cricket Stadium, Rawalpindi	Pakistan by 4 wickets
T20I 4188	11 October	Rawalpindi Cricket Stadium, Rawalpindi	Pakistan by 82 runs
T20I 4195	13 October	Rawalpindi Cricket Stadium, Rawalpindi	Sri Lanka by 8 wickets
2025–2027 ICC World Test Championship — Test Series
No.	Date	Venue	Result
Test 2643	9–13 November	Rawalpindi Cricket Stadium, Rawalpindi	Match drawn
Test 2646	17–21 November	Rawalpindi Cricket Stadium, Rawalpindi	Pakistan by 8 wickets

=== Zimbabwe women in India ===
WT20I series
No.	Date	Venue	Result
WT20I 3036	16 October	Shaheed Veer Narayan Singh International Cricket Stadium, Raipur	India by 4 wickets
WT20I 3042	18 October	Shaheed Veer Narayan Singh International Cricket Stadium, Raipur	India by 9 wickets
WT20I 3044	20 October	Shaheed Veer Narayan Singh International Cricket Stadium, Raipur	India by 92 runs
2025–2029 ICC Women's Championship — WODI series
No.	Date	Venue	Result
WODI 1571	23 October	Baroda Cricket Association Stadium, Vadodara	India by 9 wickets
WODI 1572	25 October	Baroda Cricket Association Stadium, Vadodara	India by 121 runs
WODI 1573	28 October	Baroda Cricket Association Stadium, Vadodara	India by 8 wickets

=== 2026 Afghanistan Tri-Nation Series ===
Pos	Team	Pld	W	L	NR	Pts	NRR	Qualification
1	Afghanistan	2	2	0	0	4	2.362	Advanced to the final
2	Zimbabwe	2	1	1	0	2	−0.590	Advanced to the final
3	Bangladesh	2	0	2	0	0	−1.733	Eliminated

Source: Cricinfo

Round-robin
No.	Date	Team 1	Team 2	Venue	Result
ODI 5036	17 October	Bangladesh	Zimbabwe	Sheikh Zayed Cricket Stadium, Abu Dhabi	Zimbabwe by 99 runs
ODI 5039	19 October	Afghanistan	Zimbabwe	Sheikh Zayed Cricket Stadium, Abu Dhabi	Afghanistan by 158 runs
ODI 5041	21 October	Afghanistan	Bangladesh	Sharjah Cricket Stadium, Sharjah	Afghanistan by 7 wickets
Final
ODI 5043	23 October	Afghanistan	Zimbabwe	Sharjah Cricket Stadium, Sharjah	Afghanistan by 7 wickets

=== 2026–27 Pakistan ODI Tri-Series ===
Pos	Team	Pld	W	L	NR	Pts	NRR	Qualification
1	Pakistan (H)	4	3	1	0	6	−0.114	Advanced to the final
2	Sri Lanka	4	2	2	0	4	0.654	Advanced to the final
3	England	4	1	3	0	2	−0.274	

Source: Cricinfo
(H) Host

Round-robin
No.	Date	Team 1	Team 2	Venue	Result
ODI 5037	18 October	Pakistan	Sri Lanka	Rawalpindi Cricket Stadium, Rawalpindi	Pakistan by 37 runs
ODI 5040	20 October	Pakistan	England	Rawalpindi Cricket Stadium, Rawalpindi	Pakistan by 87 runs
ODI 5042	22 October	England	Sri Lanka	Rawalpindi Cricket Stadium, Rawalpindi	Sri Lanka by 2 wickets
ODI 5044	25 October	Pakistan	England	Gaddafi Stadium, Lahore	Pakistan by 1 wicket
ODI 5045	27 October	Pakistan	Sri Lanka	Gaddafi Stadium, Lahore	Sri Lanka by 8 wickets
ODI 5046	29 October	England	Sri Lanka	Gaddafi Stadium, Lahore	England by 55 runs
Final
ODI 5047	31 October	Pakistan	Sri Lanka	Gaddafi Stadium, Lahore	Pakistan by 3 wickets

=== New Zealand women in Australia ===
WT20I series
No.	Date	Venue	Result
WT20I 3040	18 October	North Sydney Oval, Sydney	Australia by 2 wickets
WT20I 3043	20 October	North Sydney Oval, Sydney	Australia by 40 runs
WT20I 3045	22 October	North Sydney Oval, Sydney	No result
2025–2029 ICC Women's Championship — WODI series
No.	Date	Venue	Result
1st WODI	6 March	Manuka Oval, Canberra	
2nd WODI	8 March	CitiPower Centre, Melbourne	
3rd WODI	10 March	CitiPower Centre, Melbourne	

=== 2026 Cricket World Cup Challenge League A (Kenya) ===
2024–2026 ICC Cricket World Cup Challenge League – List A series
No.	Date	Team 1	Team 2	Venue	Result
1st Match	21 October	Kenya	Denmark	Gymkhana Club Ground, Nairobi	Kenya by 103 runs
2nd Match	22 October	Jersey	Papua New Guinea	Gymkhana Club Ground, Nairobi	Jersey by 172 runs
3rd Match	22 October	Kuwait	Qatar	Ruaraka Sports Club Ground, Nairobi	Qatar by 5 wickets
4th Match	24 October	Denmark	Kuwait	Gymkhana Club Ground, Nairobi	Denmark by 102 runs
5th Match	24 October	Kenya	Qatar	Ruaraka Sports Club Ground, Nairobi	Qatar by 4 runs
6th Match	25 October	Kenya	Jersey	Gymkhana Club Ground, Nairobi	Jersey by 123 runs
7th Match	25 October	Denmark	Papua New Guinea	Ruaraka Sports Club Ground, Nairobi	Papua New Guinea by 4 wickets
8th Match	27 October	Papua New Guinea	Qatar	Gymkhana Club Ground, Nairobi	Qatar by 9 wickets
9th Match	27 October	Kuwait	Jersey	Ruaraka Sports Club Ground, Nairobi	Kuwait by 7 wickets
10th Match	28 October	Denmark	Qatar	Gymkhana Club Ground, Nairobi	Denmark by 52 runs
11th Match	28 October	Kenya	Kuwait	Ruaraka Sports Club Ground, Nairobi	Kuwait by 150 runs
12th Match	30 October	Kuwait	Papua New Guinea	Gymkhana Club Ground, Nairobi	Kuwait by 10 wickets
13th Match	30 October	Denmark	Jersey	Ruaraka Sports Club Ground, Nairobi	Jersey by 72 runs
14th Match	31 October	Kenya	Papua New Guinea	Gymkhana Club Ground, Nairobi	Kenya by 88 runs
15th Match	31 October	Jersey	Qatar	Ruaraka Sports Club Ground, Nairobi	Jersey by 34 runs

=== India in New Zealand ===
T20I series
No.	Date	Venue	Result
T20I 4210	22 October	Hagley Oval, Christchurch	India by 4 wickets
T20I 4214	24 October	Hagley Oval, Christchurch	India by 4 wickets
T20I 4221	27 October	Wellington Regional Stadium, Wellington	India by 6 wickets
T20I 4224	30 October	Eden Park, Auckland	New Zealand by 87 runs
T20I 4225	1 November	Seddon Park, Hamilton	New Zealand by 7 wickets
ODI series
No.	Date	Venue	Result
ODI 5058	4 November	Eden Park, Auckland	India by 5 wickets (DLS)
ODI 5060	7 November	Wellington Regional Stadium, Wellington	India by 4 runs (DLS)
ODI 5061	10 November	Seddon Park, Hamilton	No result
ODI 5062	13 November	Bay Oval, Mount Maunganui	New Zealand by 244 runs
ODI 5064	15 November	Bay Oval, Mount Maunganui	India by 22 runs
2025–2027 ICC World Test Championship – Test series
No.	Date	Venue	Result
Test 2647	19–23 November	Basin Reserve, Wellington	
Test 2649	27 November–1 December	Hagley Oval, Christchurch	

=== Ireland in Namibia ===
ODI series
No.	Date	Venue	Result
ODI 5043	22 October	High Performance Oval, Windhoek	Ireland by 55 runs
ODI 5045	24 October	High Performance Oval, Windhoek	Namibia by 31 runs
ODI 5049	27 October	High Performance Oval, Windhoek	Namibia by 63 runs
ODI 5053	30 October	High Performance Oval, Windhoek	Ireland by 130 runs
ODI 5056	1 November	High Performance Oval, Windhoek	Namibia by 5 wickets

=== 2026 United Arab Emirates Tri-Nation Series (round 24) ===
2024–2026 Cricket World Cup League 2 – Tri-series
No.	Date	Team 1	Team 2	Venue	Result
ODI 5046	25 October	United Arab Emirates	Netherlands	ICC Academy Ground, Dubai	Netherlands by 3 wickets
ODI 5048	27 October	Netherlands	Oman	ICC Academy Ground, Dubai	Netherlands by 106 runs
ODI 5051	29 October	United Arab Emirates	Oman	ICC Academy Ground, Dubai	United Arab Emirates by 4 wickets
ODI 5054	31 October	United Arab Emirates	Netherlands	ICC Academy Ground, Dubai	United Arab Emirates by 5 wickets
ODI 5057	2 November	Netherlands	Oman	ICC Academy Ground, Dubai	Netherlands by 7 wickets
ODI 5059	4 November	United Arab Emirates	Oman	ICC Academy Ground, Dubai	United Arab Emirates by 42 runs

=== Zimbabwe against Afghanistan in the UAE ===
T20I series
No.	Date	Venue	Result
T20I 4222	27 October	Sharjah Cricket Stadium, Sharjah	Afghanistan by 37 runs
T20I 4223	29 October	Sharjah Cricket Stadium, Sharjah	Afghanistan by 19 runs
T20I 4226	1 November	Sharjah Cricket Stadium, Sharjah	Afghanistan by 7 wickets
Test series
No.	Date	Venue	Result
Test 2642	5–9 November	Sharjah Cricket Stadium, Sharjah	Match drawn
Test 2643	13–17 November	Sharjah Cricket Stadium, Sharjah	Zimbabwe by 57 runs

=== West Indies in Bangladesh ===
2025–2027 ICC World Test Championship – Test series
No.	Date	Venue	Result
Test 2640	28–31 October	Sher-e-Bangla National Cricket Stadium, Dhaka	West Indies by 8 wickets
Test 2641	5–9 November	Sylhet International Cricket Stadium, Sylhet	Match drawn

== November ==
=== 2026 Women's Emerging Nations Trophy ===
Group stage
No.	Date	Team 1	Team 2	Venue	Result
WT20I 3059	12 November	Ireland	Sri Lanka	Karwan Cricket Ground, Ajman	Sri Lanka by 10 wickets
WT20I 3060	12 November	Papua New Guinea	Scotland	Seven Districts Ground, Ajman	Scotland by 7 wickets
WT20I 3062	12 November	Bangladesh	Pakistan	Karwan Cricket Ground, Ajman	Pakistan by 8 wickets
WT20I 3063	12 November	Netherlands	Thailand	Seven Districts Ground, Ajman	Netherlands by 5 wickets
WT20I 3065	13 November	Scotland	Sri Lanka	Karwan Cricket Ground, Ajman	Sri Lanka by 6 wickets
WT20I 3066	13 November	United Arab Emirates	Ireland	Seven Districts Ground, Ajman	Ireland by 61 runs
WT20I 3067	13 November	Pakistan	Thailand	Karwan Cricket Ground, Ajman	Pakistan by 24 runs
WT20I 3068	13 November	Bangladesh	Zimbabwe	Seven Districts Ground, Ajman	Bangladesh by 9 wickets
WT20I 3071	15 November	Thailand	Zimbabwe	Karwan Cricket Ground, Ajman	Zimbabwe by 28 runs
WT20I 3072	15 November	Netherlands	Pakistan	Seven Districts Ground, Ajman	Netherlands by 8 wickets
WT20I 3073	15 November	United Arab Emirates	Scotland	Karwan Cricket Ground, Ajman	Scotland by 7 wickets
WT20I 3074	15 November	Papua New Guinea	Sri Lanka	Seven Districts Ground, Ajman	Sri Lanka by 67 runs
WT20I 3075	16 November	Bangladesh	Netherlands	Karwan Cricket Ground, Ajman	Netherlands by 5 wickets
WT20I 3076	16 November	Pakistan	Zimbabwe	Seven Districts Ground, Ajman	Pakistan by 51 runs
WT20I 3077	16 November	Ireland	Papua New Guinea	Karwan Cricket Ground, Ajman	Ireland by 45 runs
WT20I 3078	16 November	United Arab Emirates	Sri Lanka	Seven Districts Ground, Ajman	Sri Lanka by 5 wickets
WT20I 3079	18 November	United Arab Emirates	Papua New Guinea	Karwan Cricket Ground, Ajman	United Arab Emirates by 70 runs
WT20I 3080	18 November	Ireland	Scotland	Seven Districts Ground, Ajman	Scotland by 8 wickets
WT20I 3081	18 November	Netherlands	Zimbabwe	Karwan Cricket Ground, Ajman	Zimbabwe by 34 runs
WT20I 3082	18 November	Bangladesh	Thailand	Seven Districts Ground, Ajman	Bangladesh by 3 runs
Super six
WT20I 3084	20 November	Netherlands	Scotland	Karwan Cricket Ground, Ajman	Netherlands by 7 wickets
WT20I 3085	20 November	Sri Lanka	Zimbabwe	Seven Districts Ground, Ajman	Sri Lanka by 9 wickets
WT20I 3086	20 November	Ireland	Pakistan	Karwan Cricket Ground, Ajman	Ireland by 9 wickets
WT20I 3089	22 November	Netherlands	Sri Lanka	Karwan Cricket Ground, Ajman	Sri Lanka by 9 wickets
WT20I 3090	22 November	Pakistan	Scotland	Seven Districts Ground, Ajman	Pakistan by 9 wickets
WT20I 3091	22 November	Ireland	Zimbabwe	Karwan Cricket Ground, Ajman	Ireland by 3 wickets
WT20I 3093	23 November	Pakistan	Sri Lanka	Seven Districts Ground, Ajman	
WT20I 3094	23 November	Scotland	Zimbabwe	Karwan Cricket Ground, Ajman	
WT20I 3095	23 November	Ireland	Netherlands	Seven Districts Ground, Ajman	
Final
WT20I 3098	25 November	Sri Lanka	TBD	Karwan Cricket Ground, Ajman	

=== England in Australia ===
ODI series
No.	Date	Venue	Result
ODI 5063	13 November	Perth Stadium, Perth	Australia by 7 wickets
ODI 5065	15 November	Adelaide Oval, Adelaide	England by 135 runs
ODI 5066	18 November	Bellerive Oval, Hobart	England by 97 runs
T20I series
No.	Date	Venue	Result
T20I 4235	21 November	Melbourne Cricket Ground, Melbourne	Australia by 3 wickets
T20I 4236	24 November	Carrara Stadium, Gold Coast	
T20I 4237	27 November	The Gabba, Brisbane	
T20I 4238	29 November	Sydney Cricket Ground, Sydney	
5th T20I	2 December	Manuka Oval, Canberra	
Only Test
No.	Date	Venue	Result
Only Test	11–15 March	Melbourne Cricket Ground, Melbourne	

=== Bangladesh in South Africa ===
2025–2027 ICC World Test Championship – Test series
No.	Date	Venue	Result
Test 2645	15–19 November	Wanderers Stadium, Johannesburg	South Africa by 9 wickets
Test 2648	23–27 November	Centurion Park, Centurion	
ODI series
No.	Date	Venue	Result
1st ODI	1 December	Buffalo Park, East London	
2nd ODI	4 December	St George's Park Cricket Ground, Gqeberha	
3rd ODI	7 December	Newlands Cricket Ground, Cape Town	
T20I series
No.	Date	Venue	Result
1st T20I	10 December	De Beers Diamond Oval, Kimberley	
2nd T20I	12 December	Willowmoore Park, Benoni	
3rd T20I	13 December	Centurion Park, Centurion	

=== 2026 Asia Cup Rising Stars ===
Pos	Team	Pld	W	L	NR	Pts	NRR	Qualification
1	Sri Lanka A	2	2	0	0	4	1.982	Advanced to the semi-finals
2	Bangladesh A	2	2	0	0	4	0.630	Advanced to the semi-finals
3	Hong Kong	2	0	2	0	0	−0.748	Eliminated
4	Afghanistan A	2	0	2	0	0	−1.611	Eliminated

Updated to match(es) played on 21 November 2026. Source: Cricinfo

Pos	Team	Pld	W	L	NR	Pts	NRR
1	Pakistan Shaheens	2	2	0	0	4	1.090
2	India A	2	1	1	0	2	2.580
3	Nepal	2	1	1	0	2	−2.461
4	United Arab Emirates	2	0	2	0	0	−2.061

Updated to match(es) played on 22 November 2026. Source: Cricinfo

Round-robin
No.	Date	Team 1	Team 2	Venue	Result
1st Match	19 November	Bangladesh A	Hong Kong	UDST Cricket Ground, Doha	Bangladesh A by 8 wickets
2nd Match	19 November	Afghanistan A	Sri Lanka A	West End Park International Cricket Stadium, Doha	Sri Lanka A by 6 wickets
3rd Match	20 November	Pakistan Shaheens	United Arab Emirates	UDST Cricket Ground, Doha	Pakistan Shaheens by 61 runs
4th Match	20 November	India A	Nepal	West End Park International Cricket Stadium, Doha	India A by 306 runs
5th Match	21 November	Hong Kong	Sri Lanka A	UDST Cricket Ground, Doha	Sri Lanka A by 24 runs
6th Match	21 November	Afghanistan A	Bangladesh A	West End Park International Cricket Stadium, Doha	Bangladesh A by 1 wicket
ODI 5067	22 November	Nepal	United Arab Emirates	UDST Cricket Ground, Doha	Nepal by 6 wickets
8th Match	22 November	India A	Pakistan Shaheens	West End Park International Cricket Stadium, Doha	Pakistan Shaheens by 48 runs
9th Match	23 November	Afghanistan A	Hong Kong	UDST Cricket Ground, Doha	
10th Match	23 November	Bangladesh A	Sri Lanka A	West End Park International Cricket Stadium, Doha	
11th Match	24 November	India A	United Arab Emirates	UDST Cricket Ground, Doha	
12th Match	24 November	Nepal	Pakistan Shaheens	West End Park International Cricket Stadium, Doha	
Semi-finals
13th Match	26 November	TBD	TBD	West End Park International Cricket Stadium, Doha	
14th Match	27 November	TBD	TBD	West End Park International Cricket Stadium, Doha	
Final
15th Match	29 November	TBD	TBD	West End Park International Cricket Stadium, Doha	

== December ==
=== 2026 Cricket World Cup Qualifier Play-off ===
Pos	Team	Pld	W	L	NR	Pts	NRR	Qualification
1	Canada	0	0	0	0	0	—	Advance to the 2027 Cricket World Cup Qualifier
2	Italy	0	0	0	0	0	—	Advance to the 2027 Cricket World Cup Qualifier
3	Jersey	0	0	0	0	0	—	Advance to the 2027 Cricket World Cup Qualifier
4	Kuwait	0	0	0	0	0	—	Advance to the 2027 Cricket World Cup Qualifier
5	Namibia	0	0	0	0	0	—	
6	Nepal (H)	0	0	0	0	0	—	
7	Uganda	0	0	0	0	0	—	
8	United Arab Emirates	0	0	0	0	0	—	

First match(es) will be played: 4 December 2026. Source: Cricinfo
(H) Host

Group stage
No.	Date	Team 1	Team 2	Venue	Result
1st ODI	4 December	Nepal	Italy	Tribhuvan University International Cricket Ground, Kirtipur	
2nd ODI	4 December	Namibia	Uganda	Mulpani International Cricket Ground, Mulpani	
3rd ODI	5 December	Jersey	United Arab Emirates	Tribhuvan University International Cricket Ground, Kirtipur	
4th ODI	5 December	Canada	Kuwait	Mulpani International Cricket Ground, Mulpani	
5th ODI	6 December	Nepal	Uganda	Tribhuvan University International Cricket Ground, Kirtipur	
6th ODI	6 December	Italy	Namibia	Mulpani International Cricket Ground, Mulpani	
7th ODI	7 December	Jersey	Kuwait	Tribhuvan University International Cricket Ground, Kirtipur	
8th ODI	7 December	Canada	United Arab Emirates	Mulpani International Cricket Ground, Mulpani	
9th ODI	9 December	Canada	Italy	Tribhuvan University International Cricket Ground, Kirtipur	
10th ODI	9 December	Jersey	Uganda	Mulpani International Cricket Ground, Mulpani	
11th ODI	10 December	Nepal	United Arab Emirates	Tribhuvan University International Cricket Ground, Kirtipur	
12th ODI	10 December	Kuwait	Namibia	Mulpani International Cricket Ground, Mulpani	
13th ODI	12 December	Nepal	Jersey	Tribhuvan University International Cricket Ground, Kirtipur	
14th ODI	12 December	Canada	Namibia	Mulpani International Cricket Ground, Mulpani	
15th ODI	13 December	Kuwait	Uganda	Tribhuvan University International Cricket Ground, Kirtipur	
16th ODI	13 December	Italy	United Arab Emirates	Mulpani International Cricket Ground, Mulpani	
17th ODI	14 December	Nepal	Canada	Tribhuvan University International Cricket Ground, Kirtipur	
18th ODI	14 December	Jersey	Namibia	Mulpani International Cricket Ground, Mulpani	
19th ODI	15 December	Italy	Uganda	Tribhuvan University International Cricket Ground, Kirtipur	
20th ODI	15 December	Kuwait	United Arab Emirates	Mulpani International Cricket Ground, Mulpani	
21st ODI	17 December	Italy	Kuwait	Tribhuvan University International Cricket Ground, Kirtipur	
22nd ODI	17 December	Canada	Jersey	Mulpani International Cricket Ground, Mulpani	
23rd ODI	18 December	Nepal	Namibia	Tribhuvan University International Cricket Ground, Kirtipur	
24th ODI	18 December	Uganda	United Arab Emirates	Mulpani International Cricket Ground, Mulpani	
25th ODI	20 December	Namibia	United Arab Emirates	Tribhuvan University International Cricket Ground, Kirtipur	
26th ODI	20 December	Italy	Jersey	Mulpani International Cricket Ground, Mulpani	
27th ODI	21 December	Nepal	Kuwait	Tribhuvan University International Cricket Ground, Kirtipur	
28th ODI	21 December	Canada	Uganda	Mulpani International Cricket Ground, Mulpani	

=== New Zealand in Australia ===
2025–2027 ICC World Test Championship – Test series
No.	Date	Venue	Result
1st Test	9–13 December	Perth Stadium, Perth	
2nd Test	17–21 December	Adelaide Oval, Adelaide	
3rd Test	26–30 December	Melbourne Cricket Ground, Melbourne	
4th Test	4–8 January	Sydney Cricket Ground, Sydney	

=== India women in South Africa ===
WTest match
No.	Date	Venue	Result
Only WTest	9–12 December	St George's Park Cricket Ground, Gqeberha	
2025–2029 ICC Women's Championship — WODI series
No.	Date	Venue	Result
1st WODI	16 December	Boland Park, Paarl	
2nd WODI	19 December	Newlands Cricket Ground, Cape Town	
3rd WODI	22 December	Maunguang Oval, Bloemfontein	
WT20I series
No.	Date	Venue	Result
1st WT20I	26 December	Willowmoore Park, Benoni	
2nd WT20I	29 December	JB Marks Oval, Potchefstroom	
3rd WT20I	30 December	JB Marks Oval, Potchefstroom	

=== Bangladesh women in New Zealand ===
WT20I series
No.	Date	Venue	Result
1st WT20I	10 December	Saxton Oval, Nelson	
2nd WT20I	12 December	Saxton Oval, Nelson	
3rd WT20I	15 December	Basin Reserve, Wellington	
WODI series
No.	Date	Venue	Result
1st WODI	18 December	Basin Reserve, Wellington	
2nd WODI	21 December	Bay Oval, Tauranga	
3rd WODI	23 December	Bay Oval, Tauranga	

=== Sri Lanka in India ===
ODI series
No.	Date	Venue	Result
1st ODI	13 December	ACA–VDCA Cricket Stadium, Visakhapatnam	
2nd ODI	16 December	M. Chinnaswamy Stadium, Bengaluru	
3rd ODI	19 December	Narendra Modi Stadium, Ahmedabad	
T20I Series
No.	Date	Venue	Result
1st T20I	22 December	Niranjan Shah Stadium, Rajkot	
2nd T20I	24 December	Barabati Stadium, Cuttack	
3rd T20I	27 December	Maharashtra Cricket Association Stadium, Pune	

=== Australia women in Sri Lanka ===
2025–2029 ICC Women's Championship — WODI series
No.	Date	Venue	Result
1st WODI	15 December	Rangiri Dambulla International Stadium, Dambulla	
2nd WODI	18 December	Rangiri Dambulla International Stadium, Dambulla	
3rd WODI	20 December	Rangiri Dambulla International Stadium, Dambulla	

=== England in South Africa ===
2025–2027 ICC World Test Championship – Test series
No.	Date	Venue	Result
1st Test	17–21 December	Wanderers Stadium, Johannesburg	
2nd Test	26–30 December	Centurion Park, Centurion	
3rd Test	3–7 January	Newlands Cricket Ground, Cape Town	
ODI series
No.	Date	Venue	Result
1st ODI	10 January	Boland Park, Paarl	
2nd ODI	13 January	Mangaung Oval, Bloemfontein	
3rd ODI	15 January	Mangaung Oval, Bloemfontein	

== January ==
=== Zimbabwe in India ===
ODI series
No.	Date	Venue	Result
1st ODI	3 January	Eden Gardens, Kolkata	
2nd ODI	6 January	Rajiv Gandhi International Cricket Stadium, Hyderabad	
3rd ODI	9 January	Wankhede Stadium, Mumbai	

=== Sri Lanka in New Zealand ===
ODI series
No.	Date	Venue	Result
1st ODI	16 January	McLean Park, Napier	
2nd ODI	19 January	Basin Reserve, Wellington	
3rd ODI	22 January	University of Otago Oval, Dunedin	
T20I series
No.	Date	Venue	Result
1st T20I	26 January	Hagley Oval, Christchurch	
2nd T20I	29 January	Saxton Oval, Nelson	
3rd T20I	31 January	Saxton Oval, Nelson	
2025–2027 ICC World Test Championship – Test series
No.	Date	Venue	Result
1st Test	4–8 February	Bay Oval, Tauranga	
2nd Test	12–16 February	Seddon Park, Hamilton	

=== Australia in India ===
2025–2027 ICC World Test Championship – Test series
No.	Date	Venue	Result
1st Test	21–25 January	Vidarbha Cricket Association Stadium, Nagpur	
2nd Test	29 January–2 February	M. A. Chidambaram Stadium, Chennai	
3rd Test	11–15 February	Assam Cricket Association Stadium, Guwahati	
4th Test	19–23 February	JSCA International Stadium Complex, Ranchi	
5th Test	27 February–3 March	Narendra Modi Stadium, Ahmedabad	

== February ==
=== England women in Sri Lanka ===
WT20I series
No.	Date	Venue	Result
1st WT20I	1 February	Pallekele International Cricket Stadium, Kandy	
2nd WT20I	3 February	Pallekele International Cricket Stadium, Kandy	
3rd WT20I	5 February	Pallekele International Cricket Stadium, Kandy	
2025–2029 ICC Women's Championship — WODI series
No.	Date	Venue	Result
1st WODI	4 March	Rangiri Dambulla International Stadium, Dambulla	
2nd WODI	6 March	Rangiri Dambulla International Stadium, Dambulla	
3rd WODI	8 March	Rangiri Dambulla International Stadium, Dambulla	

=== England in Bangladesh ===
2025–2027 ICC World Test Championship – Test series
No.	Date	Venue	Result
1st Test			
2nd Test			

=== South Africa in Sri Lanka ===
2025–2027 ICC World Test Championship – Test series
No.	Date	Venue	Result
1st Test			
2nd Test			

== March ==
=== Australia women in South Africa ===
WT20I series
No.	Date	Venue	Result
1st WT20I	24 March	De Beers Diamond Oval, Kimberley	
2nd WT20I	27 March	Willowmoore Park, Benoni	
3rd WT20I	30 March	JB Marks Oval, Potchefstroom	
2025–2029 ICC Women's Championship — WODI series
No.	Date	Venue	Result
1st WODI	3 April	Kingsmead Cricket Ground, Durban	
2nd WODI	7 April	Boland Park, Paarl	
3rd WODI	10 April	St George's Park Cricket Ground, Gqeberha	
WTest match
No.	Date	Venue	Result
Only WTest	15–18 April	Buffalo Park, East London	

=== Bangladesh in Nepal ===
T20I series
No.	Date	Venue	Result
1st T20I	26 March	Tribhuvan University International Cricket Ground, Kirtipur	
2nd T20I	28 March	Tribhuvan University International Cricket Ground, Kirtipur	
3rd T20I	30 March	Tribhuvan University International Cricket Ground, Kirtipur	

== See also ==
- Associate international cricket in 2026–27
- International cricket in 2026
- International cricket in 2027
