= List of Falkland Islands Twenty20 International cricketers =

This is a list of Falkland Islands Twenty20 International cricketers.

In April 2018, the ICC decided to grant full Twenty20 International (T20I) status to all its members. Therefore, all Twenty20 matches played between Falkland Islands and other ICC members after 1 January 2019 have the T20I status.

This list will comprise all members of the Falkland Islands cricket team who have played at least one T20I match. It is initially arranged in the order in which each player won his first Twenty20 cap. Where more than one player will win his first Twenty20 cap in the same match, those players will be listed alphabetically by surname (according to the name format used by Cricinfo).

Falkland Islands played their first match with T20I status on 10 March 2025 against Costa Rica.

== Key ==
General

- ‡ – Captain
- † – Wicket-keeper
- First – Year of debut
- Last – Year of latest game
- Mat – Number of matches played

Batting

- Runs – Runs scored in career
- HS – Highest score
- Avg – Runs scored per dismissal
- * – Batsman remained not out
- 50 – Half-centuries scored
- 100 – Centuries scored

Bowling

- Balls – Balls bowled in career
- Wkt – Wickets taken in career
- BBI – Best bowling in an innings
- Ave – Average runs per wicket

Fielding

- Ca – Catches taken
- St – Stumpings affected

== List of Players ==
Statistics are correct as of 18 November 2026.

Cap	Name	First	Last	Mat	Batting				Bowling				Fielding		Ref(s)
Cap	Name	First	Last	Mat	Runs	HS	Avg	50	Balls	Wkt	BBI	Ave	Ca	St	Ref(s)
1	Cecil Alexander‡	2025	2026	14	34	23*	5.66	0	222	15	3/18	15.26	3	0	
2	Jaco Alexander	2025	2026	14	430	97*	39.09	0	135	16	3/16	9.87	5	0	
3	Bastie Arends	2025	2026	10	2	2	1.00	0	137	10	3/11	16.60	1	0	
4	Andrew Brownlee	2025	2026	5	6	3*	6.00	0	30	1	1/22	30.00	0	0	
5	Neil Casson	2025	2025	5	8	3*	2.66	0	–	–	–	–	2	0	
6	Alan Dawson	2025	2026	5	4	3	2.00	0	7	0	–	–	2	0	
7	Spurs Henry	2025	2026	11	26	6	5.20	0	42	0	–	–	2	0	
8	Douglas Johnson	2025	2026	14	127	25*	14.11	0	18	0	–	–	1	0	
9	Sarfraz Rao	2025	2026	14	189	43	13.50	0	222	11	3/18	25.36	2	0	
10	Juandre Scheffer†	2025	2026	14	24	12	3.42	0	–	–	–	–	9	2	
11	Phillip Stroud	2025	2026	14	213	56*	19.36	2	327	13	2/11	21.00	6	0	
12	Grant Campbell	2025	2025	2	0	0	0.00	0	12	1	1/13	13.00	1	0	
13	John Paveley	2025	2025	3	13	6	4.33	0	–	–	–	–	1	0	
14	Ramiz Rao	2025	2025	2	0	0	0*	0	–	–	–	–	1	0	
15	JP Izeta	2025	2025	1	0	0	0	0	–	–	–	–	0	0	
16	Eric Gildenhuys	2026	2026	8	168	40*	28.00	0	168	9	2/16	16.66	2	0	
17	Dameon Hercules	2026	2026	8	27	22	13.50	0	180	7	3/16	21.57	3	0	
18	Syed Saleem	2026	2026	5	–	–	–	–	–	–	–	–	1	0	
19	Hemant Chaudhury	2026	2026	5	–	–	–	–	42	5	3/22	9.60	1	0	
