= Mount Pleasant Airfield Oval =

Cricket ground in the Falkland Islands

- Interactive map of Mount Pleasant Airfield Oval

Ground information
- Location: Mount Pleasant FIQQ 1ZZ, Falkland Islands
- Country: Falkland Islands
- Coordinates: 51°50′02″S 58°27′04″W

International information

Mount Pleasant Airfield Oval is a cricket ground at Mount Pleasant, Falkland Islands. It has an artificial surface and was the only cricket ground in the Falkland Islands until another ground was opened in Stanley in December 2024. It is located at the airport Mount Pleasant. In addition, the sports complex has two football pitches and tennis court.
