= International cricket in 2027 =

International cricket season

The 2027 International cricket season will take place from April to September 2027. England will host the final for the 2025–2027 World Test Championship at The Oval, London in June 2027. Several Test and ODI matches are expected to be hosted due to the start of the next World Test Championship cycle and the build-up to the 2027 Cricket World Cup in October 2027.

== Season overview ==
=== Men's events ===
International tours
Start date	Home team	Away team	Results [Matches]		
Start date	Home team	Away team	Test	ODI	T20I
15 May 2027	England	Pakistan	—N/a	[5]	—N/a
28 May 2027	England	Bangladesh	[1]	—N/a	—N/a
1 June 2027	(England) Nepal	Scotland	—N/a	[1]	—N/a
3 June 2027	(England) Nepal	Bangladesh	—N/a	—N/a	[1]
6 June 2027	(England) Nepal	Ireland	—N/a	[1]	[3]
June 2027 (Note: This series will be postponed if Australia qualifies for the 2027 World Test Championship final, but will take place as scheduled if they fail to qualify.)	Sri Lanka	Australia	[2]	—N/a	—N/a
June 2027	Bangladesh	Pakistan	—N/a	[5]	—N/a
June 2027	Ireland	Pakistan	[1]	—N/a	—N/a
18 June 2027	England	Australia	[5]	—N/a	—N/a
July 2027	West Indies	India	[2]	[3]	[5]
August 2027	Australia	New Zealand	—N/a	[3]	—N/a
7 September 2027	England	New Zealand	—N/a	[5]	[3]
International tournaments
Start date	Tournament				Winners
9 June 2027	(England) ICC World Test Championship Final				
18 June 2027	(Bangladesh) Asia Cup				

=== Women's events ===
International tours
Start date	Home team	Away team	Results [Matches]		
Start date	Home team	Away team	WTest	WODI	WT20I
April 2027	Pakistan	New Zealand	—N/a	[3]	—N/a
April 2027	West Indies	England	—N/a	[3]	[3]
24 June 2027	England	Australia	[1]	[3]	[3]
8 September 2027	England	Bangladesh	—N/a	[3]	[3]

== April ==
=== New Zealand women in Pakistan ===
2025–2029 ICC Women's Championship — WODI series
No.	Date	Venue	Result
1st ODI	April 2027		
2nd ODI	April 2027		
3rd ODI	April 2027		

== May ==
=== Pakistan in England ===
ODI series
No.	Date	Venue	Result
1st ODI	15 May	Rose Bowl, Southampton	
2nd ODI	19 May	Old Trafford, Manchester	
3rd ODI	21 May	Headingley, Leeds	
4th ODI	23 May	Riverside Ground, Chester-le-Street	
5th ODI	26 May	Sophia Gardens, Cardiff	

=== Bangladesh in England ===
Test match
No.	Date	Venue	Result
Only Test	28 May–1 June	Lord's, London	

== June ==
=== Scotland against Nepal in England ===
ODI match
No.	Date	Venue	Result
Only ODI	1 June	Sir Paul Getty's Ground, High Wycombe	

=== Bangladesh against Nepal in England ===
T20I match
No.	Date	Venue	Result
Only T20I	3 June	Lord's Cricket Ground, London	

=== Ireland against Nepal in England ===
ODI match
No.	Date	Venue	Result
Only ODI	6 June	Sir Paul Getty's Ground, High Wycombe	
T20I series
No.	Date	Venue	Result
1st T20I	9 June	Sir Paul Getty's Ground, High Wycombe	
2nd T20I	11 June	County Cricket Ground, Beckenham	
3rd T20I	12 June	County Cricket Ground, Beckenham	

=== World Test Championship Final ===
Test match
No.	Date	Team 1	Team 2	Venue	Result
Only Test	9–13 June	TBD	TBD	The Oval, London	

=== Australia in England ===
2027–2029 ICC World Test Championship – Test series
No.	Date	Venue	Result
1st Test	18–22 June	Trent Bridge, Nottingham	
2nd Test	30 June–4 July	Lord's, London	
3rd Test	8–12 July	Edgbaston, Birmingham	
4th Test	21–25 July	Rose Bowl, Southampton	
5th Test	29 July–2 August	The Oval, London	

=== Australia women in England ===
WTest match
No.	Date	Venue	Result
Only Test	24–27 June	Headingley, Leeds	
WT20I series
No.	Date	Venue	Result
1st WT20I	3 July	Trent Bridge, Nottingham	
2nd WT20I	6 July	The Oval, London	
3rd WT20I	9 July	Old Trafford, Manchester	
WODI series
No.	Date	Venue	Result
1st WODI	13 July	Rose Bowl, Southampton	
2nd WODI	16 July	Lord's, London	
3rd WODI	20 July	Edgbaston, Birmingham	

== September ==
=== New Zealand in England ===
T20I series
No.	Date	Venue	Result
1st T20I	7 September	Riverside Ground, Chester-le-Street	
2nd T20I	9 September	Old Trafford, Manchester	
3rd T20I	11 September	Sophia Gardens, Cardiff	
ODI series
No.	Date	Venue	Result
1st ODI	14 September	Edgbaston, Birmingham	
2nd ODI	16 September	Lord's, London	
3rd ODI	19 September	County Ground, Bristol	
4th ODI	22 September	Trent Bridge, Nottingham	
5th ODI	25 September	Headingley, Leeds	

=== Bangladesh women in England ===
WT20I series
No.	Date	Venue	Result
1st WT20I	8 September	County Ground, Northampton	
2nd WT20I	10 September	County Ground, Taunton	
3rd WT20I	12 September	New Road, Worcester	
2025–2029 ICC Women's Championship — WODI series
No.	Date	Venue	Result
1st WODI	17 September	County Ground, Hove	
2nd WODI	21 September	St Lawrence Ground, Canterbury	
3rd WODI	24 September	County Ground, Chelmsford	

== See also ==
- International cricket in 2026–27
- International cricket in 2027–28
