= Falkland Cricket Association =

Sports governing body in the Falkland Islands

Falkland Cricket Association is the official governing body of the sport of cricket in the Falkland Islands. It is the Island's representative at the International Cricket Council, of which it is an associate member, having joined in 2007. It is included in the ICC Americas region.

In 2010 the Falkland Cricket Association appointed a development officer, with the aim of having 100% participation of school-age children in school cricket, for a minimum of 6 weeks a year. Falkland Cricket Association official Roger Diggle commented, "We think we might be the first country in the world to achieve 100% participation at school age."

In April 2018, the ICC decided to grant full Twenty20 International (T20I) status to all its members. Therefore, all Twenty20 matches played between Falkland Islands and other ICC members after 1 January 2019 have the T20I status.

== See also ==
- Falkland Islands national cricket team
- Falkland Islands women's national cricket team
