= International cricket in 2029 =

International cricket season

The 2029 International cricket season will take place from April 2029 to September 2029. This calendar includes men's Test, men's ODI, men's T20I, women's Test, women's ODI and women's T20I matches mainly involving full member teams, as well as some other significant series. In addition to the matches shown here, a number of other T20I series involving associate nations are being played during this period.

The Finals of 2027–2029 World Test Championship will take place in England in June 2029.

== Season overview ==
=== Men's events ===
International tours
| Start date | Home team | Away team | Results [Matches] | | |
| Start date | Home team | Away team | Test | ODI | T20I |
|---|---|---|---|---|---|
| | | | —N/a | —N/a | —N/a |
International tournaments
| Start date | Tournament | | | | Winners |
| 8 June 2029 | (England) 2027–2029 World Test Championship | | | | |

=== Women's events ===
Women's international tours
| Start date | Home team | Away team | Results [Matches] | | |
| Start date | Home team | Away team | Test | ODI | T20I |

== See also ==
- International cricket in 2028–29
