= 2026 Afghanistan Tri-Nation Series =

International cricket tour

- Date: 17–23 October 2026
- Location: United Arab Emirates
- Result: Afghanistan won the series
- Player of the series: Rashid Khan (Afg)
- Matches: 4
Teams
Afghanistan	Bangladesh	Zimbabwe
Captains
Rahmat Shah	Tawhid Hridoy	Sikandar Raza
Most runs
Ibrahim Zadran (194)	Parvez Hossain Emon (70)	Sikandar Raza (120)
Most wickets
Rashid Khan (11)	Taskin Ahmed (5)	Brad Evans (7)

The 2026 Afghanistan Tri-Nation Series was a cricket tournament that took place in the United Arab Emirates in October 2026. It was a tri-nation series contested by the men's national teams of Afghanistan, Bangladesh and Zimbabwe. In September 2026, the Afghanistan Cricket Board (ACB) confirmed the fixtures for the tour.

== Squads ==
Afghanistan	Bangladesh	Zimbabwe
Rahmat Shah (c); Rahmanullah Gurbaz (vc, wk); Ikram Alikhil (wk); Sediqullah Atal; Ibrahim Zadran; Hashmatullah Shahidi; Azmatullah Omarzai; Mohammad Nabi; Rashid Khan; Nangialai Kharoti; Allah Ghazanfar; Bilal Sami; Ziaur Rahman; Fazalhaq Farooqi; Yamin Ahmadzai	~~Litton Das~~ (c, wk); Tawhid Hridoy (c); Taskin Ahmed; Nurul Hasan (wk); Parvez Hossain Emon; Saif Hassan; Tanzid Hasan; Mosaddek Hossain; Rishad Hossain; Aliss Islam; Shoriful Islam; Tanvir Islam; Hasan Mahmud; Mehidy Hasan Miraz; Mustafizur Rahman; Soumya Sarkar; Najmul Hossain Shanto	Sikandar Raza (c); Brian Bennett; Ryan Burl; Ben Curran; Craig Ervine; Brad Evans; Wessly Madhevere; Tadiwanashe Marumani; Wellington Masakadza; Vincent Masekesa; Ernest Masuku; Blessing Muzarabani; Newman Nyamhuri; Brendan Taylor; Tafadzwa Tsiga

On 17 October, Litton Das was ruled out of the series due to a hip injury, and was replaced by Parvez Hossain Emon.

== Round robin ==
=== Points table ===
Pos	Team	Pld	W	L	NR	Pts	NRR	Qualification
1	Afghanistan	2	2	0	0	4	2.362	Advanced to the final
2	Zimbabwe	2	1	1	0	2	−0.590	Advanced to the final
3	Bangladesh	2	0	2	0	0	−1.733	Eliminated

Source: Cricinfo

=== Fixtures ===
==== 1st ODI ====
17 October 2026
15:30 (D/N)
Scorecard

Zimbabwe; 271/8 (50 overs)	v	Bangladesh; 172 (33.4 overs)
Craig Ervine 93 (106); Taskin Ahmed 3/44 (10 overs)		Tanzid Hasan 46 (38); Brad Evans 4/45 (6.4 overs)

Zimbabwe won by 99 runs
Sheikh Zayed Cricket Stadium, Abu Dhabi
Umpires: Allahudien Paleker (SA) and Izatullah Safi (Afg)
Player of the match: Craig Ervine (Zim)

- Zimbabwe won the toss and elected to bat.
- Tafadzwa Tsiga (Zim) made his ODI debut.

==== 2nd ODI ====
19 October 2026
15:30 (D/N)
Scorecard

Afghanistan; 294 (50 overs)	v	Zimbabwe; 136 (38.4 overs)
Sediqullah Atal 102 (110); Ernest Masuku 3/44 (8 overs)		Sikandar Raza 48 (80); Rashid Khan 4/17 (8 overs)

Afghanistan won by 158 runs
Sheikh Zayed Cricket Stadium, Abu Dhabi
Umpires: Farooq Khan (Afg) and Ahsan Raza (Pak)
Player of the match: Sediqullah Atal (Afg)

- Afghanistan won the toss and elected to bat.

==== 3rd ODI ====
21 October 2026
15:30 (D/N)
Scorecard

Bangladesh; 160 (41.2 overs)	v	Afghanistan; 161/3 (35.3 overs)
Parvez Hossain Emon 70 (96); Rashid Khan 4/31 (8.2 overs)		Rahmat Shah 67* (90); Taskin Ahmed 2/36 (8 overs)

Afghanistan won 7 by wickets
Sharjah Cricket Stadium, Sharjah
Umpires: Ahmad Shah Durrani (Afg) and Allahudien Paleker (SA)
Player of the match: Rashid Khan (Afg)

- Bangladesh won the toss and elected to bat.
- Aliss Islam (Ban) made his ODI debut.
- Azmatullah Omarzai (Afg) played in his 50th ODI match.

== Final ==
23 October 2026
15:30 (D/N)
Scorecard

Zimbabwe; 169 (43.3 overs)	v	Afghanistan; 170/3 (34.3 overs)
Sikandar Raza 68 (83); Rashid Khan 3/41 (10 overs)		Ibrahim Zadran 70* (96); Newman Nyamhuri 2/30 (6 overs)

Afghanistan won by 7 wickets
Sharjah Cricket Stadium, Sharjah
Umpires: Ahmed Shah Pakteen (Afg) and Ahsan Raza (Pak)
Player of the match: Ibrahim Zadran (Afg)

- Zimbabwe won the toss and elected to bat.
