= 2025–26 Jay Trophy =

Cricket tournament

- Dates: 20 February – 19 March 2026
- Administrator: Cricket Association of Nepal
- Cricket format: League stage: 2-day; Final: 3-day
- Tournament format(s): Round-robin and Final
- Champions: Nepal Police Club (2nd title)
- Runners-up: Tribhuwan Army Club
- Participants: 4
- Matches: 7
- Player of the series: Lalit Rajbanshi (Nepal Police Club)
- Most runs: Kushal Bhurtel (Nepal Police Club) (336)
- Most wickets: Lalit Rajbanshi (Nepal Police Club) (26)

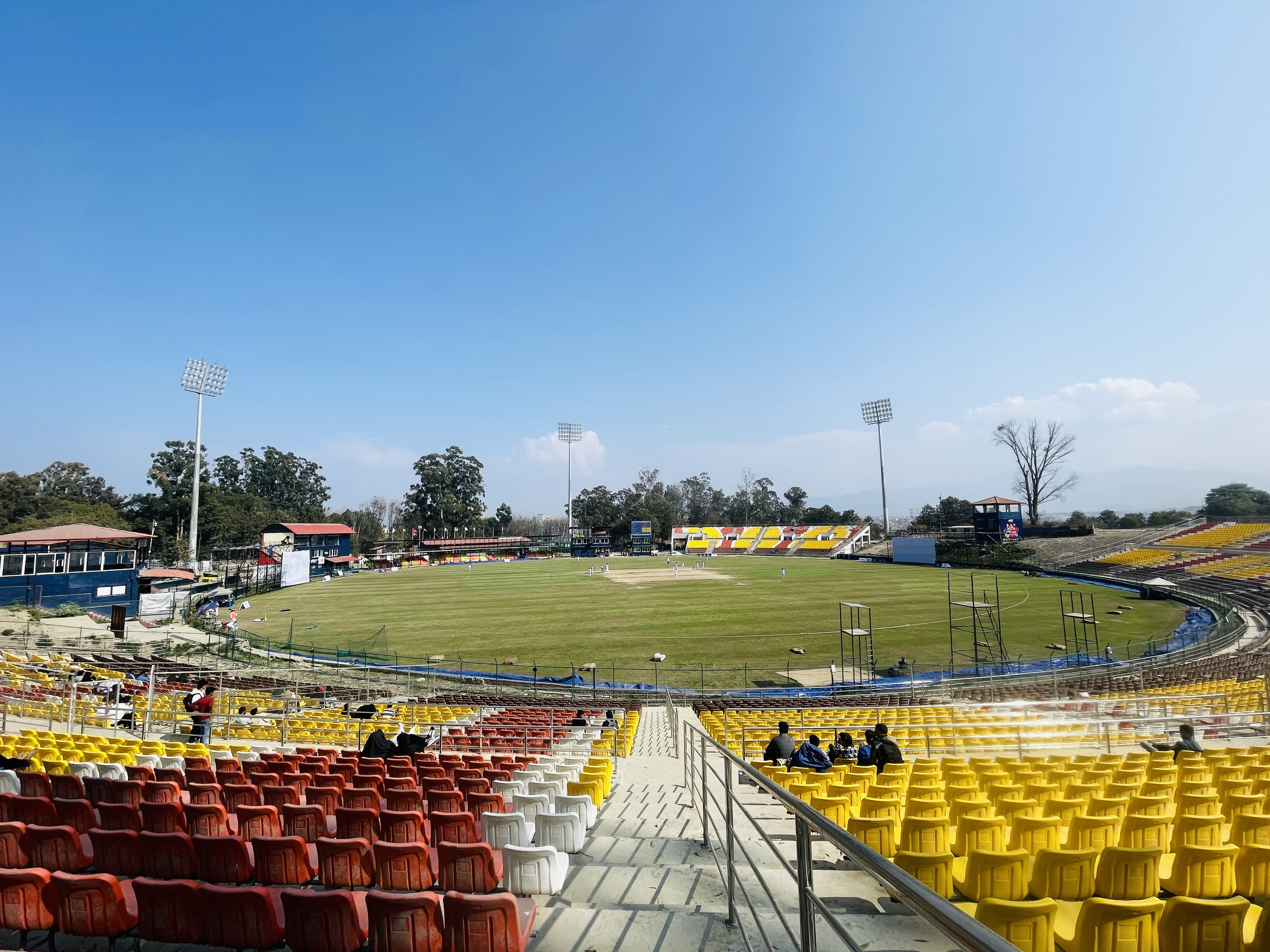
Match between Nepal Police Club and Tribuwan Army Club on 20 February at Tribhuvan University International Cricket Ground, Kirtipur.

The 2025–26 Jay Trophy (also known as the Xtreme Energy Drink Jay Trophy for sponsorship reasons) was the second season of the Jay Trophy, the premier domestic red-ball cricket competition played in Nepal. The tournament began on 20 February 2026. The final was initially scheduled to held from 1 to 3 March 2026, but later it was moved to 5 to 7 April 2026 due to the 2026 Nepalese general election, and again it was rescheduled and held between 17–19 March 2026 at the Upper Mulpani Cricket Ground after the elections concluded.

Nepal Police Club were the defending champions, having won the inaugural season and successfully defended their title by defeating Tribhuwan Army Club in the final by 4 wickets.

== Teams ==
The top four teams of 2025 Prime Minister Cup were qualified for the second season of Jay Trophy.

- Nepal APF Club
- Bagmati Province
- Nepal Police Club
- Tribhuwan Army Club

== Tournament Format ==
The tournament was played as follows.

- All matches in the league stage were played over two days, with the final lasting three days.
- Each day featured 110 overs in three sessions, played over six hours and forty-five minutes.
- In the league stage, the first innings was capped at 70 overs, increasing to 80 overs for the final.
- Each team played three matches in the league stage, and the top two teams qualified for the final.

=== Points system ===
Result	Points
An outright win	6
Lead in first innings	4
Tie on first innings	2
Draw or No Result	1
An outright loss	0
Bonus batting points	0.5 for every 25 runs scored in the first innings 0.5 for every 25 runs scored throughout the second innings up to 4 points
Bonus bowling points	0.5 for taking each wicket

== Venues ==
Venues in Kathmandu
Tribhuvan University, Kirtipur	Cricket Venues in Kathmandu District	Kageshwari-Manohara, Mulpani
Tribhuvan University International Cricket Ground	Cricket Venues in Kathmandu District	Mulpani International Cricket Ground (Upper Mulpani Cricket Ground)
Capacity: 14,000	Cricket Venues in Kathmandu District	Capacity: 5,000

== Squads ==
On 19 February 2026, Cricket Association of Nepal announced the all four team squad.

Bagmati Province	Nepal APF Club	Nepal Police Club	Tribhuwan Army Club
Sandeep Lamichhane (c); Bipin Acharya; Tilak Bhandari; Rijan Dhakal; Rit Gautam; Aashutosh Ghiraiya; Gautam KC; Shubh Kansakar; Sachin Lekhak; Bibek Magar; Dayanand Mandal; Ishan Pandey; Pankaj Pandey; Surya Tamang; Uttam Thapa (wk)	Rohit Paudel (c); Irshad Ahmad; Lokesh Bam; Abinash Bohara; Deepak Bohara; Puran BK; Sundeep Jora; Bhuwan Karki; Yuvraj Khatri; Yagyaman Kumal; Sumit Maharjan; Amar Routela; Aasif Sheikh (wk); Prajjwal Shahi	Arif Sheikh (c); Dilsad Ali (wk); Bimal BK; Kushal Bhurtel; Dipak Chand; Sagar Dhakal; Karan KC; Rasid Khan; Gulshan Jha (Note: Gulshan Jha was initially replaced by Sohail Kunwar for the league games of Nepal Police Club's squad due to injury. Gulshan Jha played for Nepal Police Club in the final.); Lalit Rajbanshi; Shankar Rana; Deepak Serala; Amit Shrestha; Amit Yadav; Sarwan Yadav; Sohail Kunwar	Binod Bhandari (c, wk); Basir Ahamad; Shahab Alam; Aakash Chand; Trit Raj Das; Anish Dhami; Durgesh Gupta; Sompal Kami; Jitendra Singh Karki; Santosh Karki (wk); Pawan Karki; Kushal Malla; Naren Saud; Bhim Sharki; Imran Sheikh

== Points table ==
Pos	Team	Pld	W	L	D	Pts	Qualification
1	Tribhuwan Army Club	3	1	0	2	66	Advanced to the final
2	Nepal Police Club	3	2	1	0	65.5	Advanced to the final
3	Nepal APF Club	3	1	1	1	53	
4	Bagmati Province	3	0	2	1	40	

Source: ESPNcricinfo

== Round-robin ==
=== Round 1 ===
20–21 February 2026
Scorecard

Nepal Police Club	v	Tribhuwan Army Club
187/8d (53.3 overs); Rashid Khan 38 (55); Pawan Karki 4/51 (10.3 overs)		234/9d (40 overs); Bhim Sharki 105* (113); Sagar Dhakal 6/92 (17 overs)
88 (38.2 overs); Kushal Bhurtel 48 (99); Basir Ahamad 4/16 (9 overs)		43/1 (5.1 overs); Kushal Malla 42* (24); Lalit Rajbanshi 1/10 (3 overs)

Tribhuwan Army Club won by 9 wickets
Tribhuvan University International Cricket Ground, Kirtipur
Umpires: Vinay Kumar Jha and Ram Kailash Yadav
Player of the match: Bhim Sharki (Tribhuwan Army Club)

- Tribhuwan Army Club won the toss and elected to field.
- Bhim Sharki (Tribhuwan Army Club) scored his maiden century in Jay Trophy.
- Points: Tribhuwan Army Club 24, Nepal Police Club 10

20–21 February 2026
Scorecard

Bagmati Province	v	Nepal APF Club
207/9d (54.5 overs); Bibek Magar 42 (47); Irshad Ahamad 3/36 (17 overs)		239 (49.2 overs); Rohit Paudel 87* (113); Rijan Dhakal 3/36 (9 overs)
168 (47.1 overs); Ishan Pandey 84 (107); Irshad Ahamad 5/66 (19.1 overs)		137/2 (20.2 overs); Aasif Sheikh 59 (59); Surya Tamang 1/27 (5 overs)

Nepal APF Club won by 8 wickets
Mulpani International Cricket Ground, Kageshwari-Manohara
Umpires: Hem Raj Bhatta and Durga Subedi
Player of the match: Rohit Paudel (Nepal APF Club)

- Nepal APF Club won the toss and elected to field.
- Irshad Ahamad (Nepal APF Club) took his maiden five-wicket haul in Jay Trophy.
- Points: Nepal APF Club 26.5, Bagmati Province 12

=== Round 2 ===
23–24 February 2026
Scorecard

Nepal APF Club	v	Nepal Police Club
185 (63.4 overs); Rohit Paudel 45 (48); Sagar Dhakal 4/66 (26 overs)		277/7d (69.5 overs); Shankar Rana 105* (155); Sundeep Jora 1/3 (1 overs)
204 (62.3 overs); Deepak Bohara 94 (129); Lalit Rajbanshi 5/80 (28.3 overs)		113/1 (16.4 overs); Kushal Bhurtel 71* (53); Bhuvan Karki 1/42 (7 overs)

Nepal Police Club won by 9 wickets
Tribhuvan University International Cricket Ground, Kirtipur
Umpires: Vinay Kumar Jha and Hiralal Raut
Player of the match: Lalit Rajbanshi (Nepal Police Club)

- Nepal Police Club won the toss and elected to field.
- Shankar Rana (Nepal Police Club) scored his maiden century in Jay Trophy.
- Points: Nepal Police Club 27.5, Nepal APF Club 11.5

23–24 February 2026
Scorecard

Bagmati Province	v	Tribhuwan Army Club
259/7d (70 overs); Ashutosh Ghiraiya 77 (127); Shahab Alam 3/65 (22 overs)		352/7d (69.3 overs); Bhim Sharki 74 (83); Rijan Dhakal 2/81 (16.3 overs)
210/3d (47.4 overs); Ashutosh Ghiraiya 76 (124); Basir Ahamad 2/35 (9 overs)		39/4 (5 overs); Trit Raj Das 16 (8); Sandeep Lamichhane 3/28 (3 overs)

Match drawn
Mulpani International Cricket Ground, Kageshwari-Manohara
Umpires: Ram Pandey and Buddhi Pradhan
Player of the match: Ashutosh Ghiraiya (Bagmati Province)

- Tribhuwan Army Club won the toss and elected to field.
- Points: Tribhuwan Army Club 18.5, Bagmati Province 14.5

=== Round 3 ===
26–27 February 2026
Scorecard

Bagmati Province	v	Nepal Police Club
185 (53.5 overs); Bipin Acharya 46* (75); Karan KC 4/27 (13 overs)		334/8d (70 overs); Kushal Bhurtel 96 (84); Sandeep Lamichhane 4/118 (31 overs)
237 (62.2 overs); Ishan Pandey 80 (90); Lalit Rajbanshi 5/84 (26.2 overs)		89/2 (15.1 overs); Sohail Kunwar 35* (52); Rijan Dhakal 1/23 (3 overs)

Nepal Police Club won by 8 wickets
Tribhuvan University International Cricket Ground, Kirtipur
Umpires: Buddhi Pradhan and Sanjay Sigdel
Player of the match: Karan KC (Nepal Police Club)

- Nepal Police Club won the toss and elected to field.
- Points: Nepal Police Club 28, Bagmati Province 12.5

26–27 February 2026
Scorecard

Tribhuwan Army Club	v	Nepal APF Club
252/9d (68.4 overs); Trit Raj Das 102 (159); Yuvraj Khatri 5/55 (14 overs)		140 (46.3 overs); Rohit Paudel 48 (105); Sompal Kami 4/44 (9 overs)
268/8d (56.3 overs); Basir Ahamad 101* (119); Rohit Paudel 3/47 (9.3 overs)		228/7 (47 overs); Lokesh Bam 64 (65); Naren Saud 5/79 (17 overs)

Match drawn
Mulpani International Cricket Ground, Kageshwari-Manohara
Umpires: Himal Giri and Vinay Kumar Jha
Player of the match: Basir Ahamad (Tribhuwan Army Club)

- Nepal APF Club won the toss and elected to field.
- Trit Raj Das and Basir Ahamad (Tribhuwan Army Club) both scored their maiden century in Jay Trophy.
- Yuvraj Khatri (Nepal APF Club) and Naren Saud (Tribhuwan Army Club) both took their maiden five-wicket haul in Jay Trophy.
- Points: Tribhuwan Army Club 23.5, Nepal APF Club 15

== Final ==
17–19 March 2026 (Note: The final, initially moved to 5–7 April, was later rescheduled to 17–19 March 2026 at the Mulpani International Cricket Ground after the elections concluded and League 2 was postponed.)
Scorecard

Tribhuwan Army Club	v	Nepal Police Club
221 (58.2 overs); Imran Sheikh 50 (137); Rashid Khan 4/17 (4 overs)		221 (61.4 overs); Karan KC 72* (109); Sompal Kami 5/72 (17 overs)
226 (74.2 overs); Aakash Chand 37 (102); Sagar Dhakal 4/43 (16.2 overs)		230/6 (56.4 overs); Rashid Khan 81 (128); Shahab Alam 2/60 (24.4 overs)

Nepal Police Club won by 4 wickets
Mulpani International Cricket Ground, Kageshwori Manohara
Umpires: Vinay Kumar Jha and Durga Subedi
Player of the match: Rashid Khan (Nepal Police Club)

- Nepal Police Club won the toss and elected to field.
- No play was possible on day 1 before lunch due to wet outfield.

== Statistics ==
=== Most runs ===
Runs	Player	Team	Mat	Inns	NO	Average	BF	SR	HS	100s	50s	0	4s	6s
336	Kushal Bhurtel	Nepal Police Club	4	7	1	56.00	428	78.50	96	0	3	0	39	6
331	Ishan Pandey	Bagmati Province	3	6	1	66.20	478	69.24	84	0	3	0	37	6
279	Rohit Paudel	Nepal APF Club	3	6	2	69.75	348	80.17	87*	0	2	0	35	2
266	Bhim Sharki	Tribhuwan Army Club	4	8	2	44.33	314	84.71	105*	1	1	1	31	5
225	Deepak Bohara	Nepal APF Club	3	6	0	37.50	308	73.05	94	0	1	0	24	7
225	Ashutosh Ghiraiya	Bagmati Province	3	6	0	37.50	371	60.64	77	0	2	1	32	1
Source:ESPNCricinfo

=== Most wickets ===
Wickets	Player	Team	Mat	Inns	Runs	Overs	BBI	Ave	Econ	SR	4WI	5WI
26	Lalit Rajbanshi	Nepal Police Club	4	8	519	167.3	5/80	19.96	3.09	38.65	1	2
16	Sagar Dhakal	Nepal Police Club	4	8	341	98.3	6/92	21.31	3.46	36.93	2	1
11	Karan KC	Nepal Police Club	2	4	191	59.2	4/27	17.36	3.21	32.36	1	0
11	Naren Saud	Tribhuwan Army Club	4	6	201	57.0	5/79	18.27	3.52	31.09	0	1
11	Shahab Alam	Tribhuwan Army Club	4	8	344	134.1	3/65	31.27	2.56	73.18	0	0
Source:ESPNCricinfo

=== End of season awards ===
The following players were honored with their respective awards.

S.No.	Award	Player	Team	Ref.
1	Best Batter	Ishan Pandey	Bagmati Province	
2	Best Bowler	Lalit Rajbanshi	Nepal Police Club	
3	Player of the tournament	Lalit Rajbanshi	Nepal Police Club	
