= 2024–25 Jay Trophy =

Cricket tournament

- Dates: 5 – 16 January 2025
- Administrator: Cricket Association of Nepal
- Cricket format: League stage: 2-day; Final: 3-day
- Tournament format(s): Round-robin and Final
- Champions: Nepal Police Club (1st title)
- Runners-up: Tribuwan Army Club
- Participants: 4
- Matches: 7
- Player of the series: Shahab Alam (Tribuwan Army Club)
- Most runs: Mayan Yadav (Madhesh Province) (268)
- Most wickets: Shahab Alam (Tribuwan Army Club) (33)

The 2024–25 Jay Trophy was the inaugural season of the Jay Trophy, the premier domestic red ball competition played in Nepal. The tournament started on 5 January 2025, and the final held on 14 January 2025.

Nepal Police Club won the inaugural season after defeating Tribhuwan Army Club by 28 runs in the final.

== Background ==
In January 2024, Cricket Association of Nepal proposed the Men’s Elite Trophy before changing it to Jay Trophy Men's Elite Cup to introduce a multi-day format for the top teams from the Prime Minister Cup. This initiative aims to provide a higher level of competition and further the development of cricket in Nepal.

== Squads ==
Bagmati Province	Madhesh Province	Nepal Police Club	Tribuwan Army Club
Sandeep Lamichhane (c); Bipin Acharya; Roshan BK; Tilak Bhandari; Rijan Dhakal; Rit Gautam; Pratish GC; Aashutosh Ghiraiya; Shubh Kansakar; Suryanshu Koirala; Uttam Thapa Magar (wk); Ishan Pandey; Pratik Shrestha; Surya Tamang; Nandan Yadav	Harishankar Shah (c); Himanshu Dutta (wk); Ranjit Kumar; Rahul Mandal; Bishal Patel; Sahil Patel; Pradeep Paswan; Afrudin Rain; Sailendra Sah; Bhulawan Sahani; Rupesh Singh; Abhisekh Tiwari; Mayan Yadav; Niraj Yadav; Rajesh Yadav	Aarif Sheikh (c); Kushal Bhurtel; Sagar Dhakal; Sunil Daulyal; Gulsan Jha; Abhinash Karn; Karan KC; Rashid Khan; Dilip Nath; Lalit Rajbanshi; Shankar Rana; Arjun Saud (wk); Deepak Serala; Amit Shrestha; Shrawan Yadav	Binod Bhandari (c, wk); Basir Ahamad; Shahab Alam; Aakash Chand; Trit Raj Das; Durgesh Gupta; Sompal Kami; Pawan Karki; Santosh Karki; Kushal Malla; Naren Saud; Imran Sheikh; Bhim Sharki; Sumit Shrestha; Bibek Yadav

== Venue ==
Nepal
2024–25 Jay Trophy (Nepal)

== Teams and standings ==
=== Points table ===
Pos	Team	Pld	W	L	D	Pts	Qualification
1	Nepal Police Club	3	2	0	1	66	Advanced to the final
2	Tribhuwan Army Club	3	1	0	2	55	Advanced to the final
3	Bagmati Province	3	0	1	2	41.5	Eliminated
4	Madhesh Province	3	0	2	1	31	Eliminated

Source: ESPNcricinfo

=== Match summary ===
The total team points at the end of each round are listed.

Team	Round			Total
Team	1	2	3	Total
Bagmati Province	15	28	41.5	41.5
Madhesh Province	15	21	31	31
Nepal Police Club	15	40	66	66
Tribhuwan Army Club	14	30	55	55

Win	Loss	Draw	Abandoned

== Fixtures ==
=== Round 1 ===
5–6 January 2024
Scorecard

Tribhuwan Army Club	v	Nepal Police Club
121 (34.4 overs); Kushal Malla 25 (38); Lalit Rajbanshi 7/47 (14.4 overs)		125 (33.1 overs); Gulsan Jha 47 (54); Shahab Alam 8/59 (15.1 overs)
175 (53 overs); Sompal Kami 82* (138); Kushal Bhurtel 4/50 (16 overs)		88/5 (42 overs); Amit Shrestha 36 (66); Aakash Chand 2/23 (7 overs)

Match drawn
Narayani Cricket Ground, Birgunj
Umpires: Himal Giri and Sanjay Gurung
Player of the match: Shahab Alam (Tribhuwan Army Club)

- Nepal Police Club won the toss and elected to bowl.
- Lalit Rajbanshi (Nepal Police Club) became the first player to take a five-wicket haul in the Jay Trophy.
- Points: Nepal Police Club 15, Tribhuwan Army Club 14

5–6 January 2024
Scorecard

Madhesh Province	v	Bagmati Province
102 (35.3 overs); Mayan Yadav 21 (36); Sandeep Lamichhane 5/41 (14 overs)		150 (34.5 overs); Nandan Yadav 47 (55); Abhisekh Tiwari 4/25 (6.5 overs)
211/9d (43.2 overs); Mayan Yadav 106 (108); Sandeep Lamichhane 5/88 (17 overs)		97/6 (20 overs); Rit Gautam 25 (18); Harishankar Shah 3/14 (5 overs)

Match drawn
Shree Ram Janaki International Stadium, Janakpur
Umpires: Vinay Kumar Jha and Ram Yadav
Player of the match: Sandeep Lamichhane (Bagmati Province)

- Madhesh Province won the toss and elected to bat.
- Mayan Yadav (Madhesh Province) became the first player to score a century in the Jay Trophy.
- Points: Madhesh Province 15, Bagmati Province 15

=== Round 2 ===
8–9 January 2024
Scorecard

Madhesh Province	v	Nepal Police Club
129 (42.4 overs); Mayan Yadav 59 (102); Gulsan Jha 5/40 (13 overs)		258/4d (59 overs); Kushal Bhurtel 63 (68); Harishankar Shah 2/25 (9 overs)
94 (32.2 overs); Bishal Patel 27 (39); Kushal Bhurtel 5/22 (4.2 overs)

Nepal Police Club won by an innings and 35 runs
Narayani Cricket Ground, Birgunj
Umpires: Himal Giri and Sanjay Sigdel
Player of the match: Kushal Bhurtel (Nepal Police Club)

- Nepal Police Club won the toss and elected to field.
- Points: Nepal Police Club 25, Madhesh Province 6

8–9 January 2024
Scorecard

Tribhuwan Army Club	v	Bagmati Province
276/5 (60 overs); Imran Sheikh 72 (104); Bipin Acharya 3/45 (13 overs)		200/9d (50 overs); Nandan Yadav 51 (80); Aakash Chand 3/45 (7 overs)
127/8d Trit Raj Das 28 (39); Nandan Yadav 4/32 (10 overs)		80/5 (28.4 overs); Shubh Kansakar 33 (63); Pawan Karki 2/6 (7.4 overs)

Match drawn
Shree Ram Janaki International Stadium, Janakpur
Umpires: Vinay Kumar Jha and Hiralal Raut
Player of the match: Nandan Yadav (Bagmati Province)

- Bagmati Province won the toss and elected to field.
- Points: Tribhuwan Army Club 16, Bagmati Province 13

=== Round 3 ===
11–12 January 2024
Scorecard

Tribhuwan Army Club	v	Madhesh Province
225/9d (35 overs); Basir Ahamad 67 (98); Ranjit Kumar 5/44 (16.3 overs)		102 (35.5 overs); Harishankar Shah 31 (43); Shahab Alam 6/37 (12 overs)
30/2 (5 overs); Trit Raj Das 13 (13); Pradip Paswan 2/15 (3 overs)		150 (64.1 over) (f/o); Mayan Yadav 49 (87); Basir Ahamad 4/23 (23.1 overs)

Tribhuwan Army Club won by 8 wickets
Narayani Cricket Ground, Birgunj
Umpires: Sanjay Gurung and Basu Karn
Player of the match: Shahab Alam (Tribhuwan Army Club)

- Madhesh Province won the toss and elected to field.
- Points: Tribhuwan Army Club 24, Madhesh Province 10

11–12 January 2024
Scorecard

Bagmati Province	v	Nepal Police Club
112 (33.2 overs); Ishan Pandey 71 (94); Lalit Rajbanshi 4/27 (9 overs)		215 (45.5 overs); Amit Shrestha 79 (97); Sandeep Lamichhane 4/65 (11.5 overs)
218 (53 overs); Shubh Kansakar 70 (74); Lalit Rajbanshi 3/59 (20)		116/5 (23 overs); Amit Shrestha 56 (45); Sandeep Lamichhane 2/46 (10 overs)

Nepal Police Club won by 5 wickets
Shree Ram Janaki International Stadium, Janakpur
Umpires: Vinay Kumar Jha and Ram Kailash Yadav
Player of the match: Amit Shrestha (Nepal Police Club)

- Nepal Police Club won the toss and elected to field.
- Sharwan Yadav (Nepal Police Club) became the first player to take a hat-trick in the Jay Trophy.
- Points: Nepal Police Club 26, Bagmati Province 13.5

== Final ==
14–16 January 2024
Scorecard

Nepal Police Club	v	Tribhuwan Army Club
133/9d (36.4 overs); Kushal Bhurtel 50 (56); Shahab Alam 7/37 (12.4 overs)		170 (39.5 overs); Bhim Sharki 58 (55); Sagar Dhakal 5/78 (15.5 overs)
139 (49.1 overs); Kushal Bhurtel 45 (67); Basir Ahamad 5/49 (22.1 overs)		74 (29.2 overs); Imran Sheikh 28 (51); Sagar Dhakal 6/35 (14.2 overs)

Nepal Police Club won by 28 runs
Narayani Cricket Ground, Birgunj
Umpires: Sanjay Gurung and Vinay Kumar Jha
Player of the match: Sagar Dhakal (Nepal Police Club)

- Tribhuwan Army Club won the toss and elected to field.
- No play was possible before lunch on day 1 due to bad weather.
- Only 17 overs were played on day 1 due to bad weather.

== End of season awards ==
- Player of the Series: Shahab Alam (Tribhuwan Army Club)
- Best Batter: Mayan Yadav (Madhesh Province)
- Best Bowler: Shahab Alam (Tribhuwan Army Club)
