= 2026 Prime Minister Cup =

8th edition of the Prime Minister Cup Men's National Cricket Tournament

- Prime Minister Cup 2026
- Dates: 21 March – 18 April 2026
- Administrator: Cricket Association of Nepal
- Cricket format: One Day
- Tournament format(s): Round-robin and Final
- Host(s): Bagmati Province; Madhesh Province
- Champions: Tribhuwan Army Club (3rd title)
- Runners-up: Sudurpashchim Province
- Participants: 10
- Matches: 46
- Player of the series: Santosh Yadav (Lumbini Province)
- Most runs: Arjun Kumal (Gandaki Province) (504)
- Most wickets: Hemant Dhami (Sudurpashchim Province) (27)

The 2026 Prime Minister Cup (also known as the Xtreme Energy Drink PM Cup Men's Tournament 2026 for sponsorship reasons) was the eighth edition of the Prime Minister One Day Cup, the premier one-day cricket tournament in Nepal. The tournament was contested by teams representing the seven Provinces of Nepal and three departmental teams.

Nepal Police Club were the defending champion. and were eliminated in the league stage. Tribhuwan Army Club won their third Prime Minister Cup title, defeating Sudurpashchim Province by five wickets in the final of 2026 season.

== Background ==
The 8th edition of the tournament took place from 21 March to 18 April 2026, organised by the Cricket Association of Nepal (CAN) and the National Sports Council. It followed a round-robin format with 10 teams (seven provincial and three departmental), and a total of 46 matches were played across four venues in Madhesh Province and Bagmati Province.

== Venues ==
All matches initially scheduled at TU International Cricket Stadium were relocated to Lower Mulpani Cricket Ground for the preparations of upcoming 2026 Nepal Tri-Nation Series (May), part of the 2024–2026 Cricket World Cup League 2.

Nepal
Kageshwari-Manohara	Kageshwari-Manohara	Birgunj	Janakpur
Lower Mulpani Cricket Ground	Mulpani International Cricket Ground	Narayani Cricket Ground	Shree Ram Janaki International Stadium
Matches: 5	Matches: 5	Matches: 19	Matches: 17

== Squads ==
Cricket Association of Nepal announced the squads of all teams on 20 and 21 March 2026.

Bagmati Province	Gandaki Province	Lumbini Province	Karnali Province	Koshi Province
Sandeep Lamichhane (c); Ishan Pandey (vc); Sonu Devkota; Rijan Dhakal; Pratis GC; Ashutosh Ghiraiya; Shubh Kansakar; Subash Khatri; Ringzin Lama; Sachin Lekhak; Bibek Magar; Uttam Magar (wk); Dayanand Mandal; Shivam Tiwari; Pawan Thapa	Bipin Khatri (c); Gaurav BK; Subash Bhandari; Dinesh Budhamagar; Vansh Chhetri; Deepak Dumre (wk); Bishow Karki; Arjun Kumal; Ankit Neupane; Sandesh Panthi; Kamal Pariyar; Krishna Paudel; Aprajit Poudel; Cibrin Shrestha; Muskan Thapa	Dev Khanal (c); Rajendra Bam; Dinesh Bohara; Ajay Chauhan; Nirmal Gurung; Biparsan KC; Ranjeet Khadka; Salahuddin Khan; Bir Magar; Sumit Shrestha; Darsh Sonar; Prajwal Thapa (wk); Sandesh Thapa; Aakash Tripathi; Santosh Yadav	Diwan Pun (c); Dinesh Adhikari; Laxman Bam; Anuj Chanara; Sunil Dhamala; Arjun Gharti (wk); Prakash Jaishi; Arvind Gharti; Bipin Rawal (wk); Nischal Rawal; Dipendra Rawat; Bipin Shahi; Rabindra Shahi; Raj Shah; Bipin Sharma; Unish Singh	Sujan Thapaliya (c); Shakib Haque (vc); Firdosh Ansari; Shiwansh Bajgain (wk); Prem Kamat; Dipesh Kandel; Samir Karki; Aashish Rana Magar; Bipin Mahato; Prabhat Rai (wk); Rohan Shah; Gyanendra Shrestha; Suman Shrestha; Ankit Subedi; Sonu Ansari
Madhesh Province	Nepal APF Club	Nepal Police Club	Sudurpashchim Province	Tribhuwan Army Club
Anil Sah (c); Mohammad Aadil Alam; Aashik Baitha; Himanshu Dutta (wk); Ranjit Kumar; Pradip Paswan; Bishal Patel; Pawan Sarraf; Mohammad Samir; Bishal Shusling; Rupesh Singh; Abhisekh Tiwari; Arniko Yadav; Mayan Yadav; Niraj Yadav	Rohit Paudel (c); Aasif Sheikh (vc, wk); Kamal Singh Airee; Lokesh Bam; Puran BK; Abinash Bohara; Deepak Bohara; Abhishesh Gautam; Sundeep Jora; Bhuvan Karki; Yuvraj Khatri; Sumit Maharjan; Amar Routela; Prajwal Shahi; Nandan Yadav	Aarif Sheikh (c); Dilsad Ali (wk); Kushal Bhurtel; Dipak Chand; Sagar Dhakal; Gulshan Jha; Karan KC; Abhinash Karn; Rashid Khan; Dinesh Kharel; Lalit Rajbanshi; Shankar Rana; Deepak Serala; Amit Shrestha; Sarwan Yadav	Sher Malla (c); Kiran Thagunna (vc); Bikash Aagri; Naren Bhatta; Dipak Bohara; Khadak Bohara; Milan Bohara; Lokendra Chand; Ashok Dhami; Hemant Dhami; Abhishek Pal; Prakash Pandey; Raju Rijal (wk); Saurya Shrestha	Binod Bhandari (c, wk); Basir Ahamad; Shahab Alam; Aakash Chand; Trit Raj Das; Durgesh Gupta; Sompal Kami; Pawan Karki; Santosh Karki; Kushal Malla; Naren Saud; Arjun Saud; Bhim Sharki; Imran Sheikh; Jitendra Thakuri

== Team and standings ==
=== Points table ===
Pos	Team	Pld	W	L	NR	Pts	NRR	Qualification
1	Tribhuwan Army Club	9	8	0	1	17	2.472	Advanced to the final and qualified for the 2026–27 Jay Trophy
2	Sudurpashchim Province	9	6	3	0	12	0.602	Advanced to the final and qualified for the 2026–27 Jay Trophy
3	Nepal APF Club	9	5	3	1	11	0.422	Qualified for the 2026–27 Jay Trophy
4	Madhesh Province	9	5	3	1	11	0.405	Qualified for the 2026–27 Jay Trophy
5	Nepal Police Club	9	4	4	1	9	0.258	Qualified for the 2026–27 Jay Trophy
6	Lumbini Province	9	4	4	1	9	0.207	Qualified for the 2026–27 Jay Trophy
7	Gandaki Province	9	4	4	1	9	−0.107	Eliminated
8	Bagmati Province	9	4	5	0	8	0.339	Eliminated
9	Karnali Province	9	1	7	1	3	−1.979	Eliminated
10	Koshi Province	9	0	8	1	1	−2.119	Eliminated

Source: ESPNcricinfo, Cricclubs Nepal

=== League progression ===
Team	Group matches									Play-offs
Team	1	2	3	4	5	6	7	8	9	Final
Bagmati Province	0	2	2	2	4	4	6	8	8	—
Gandaki Province	0	0	1	3	3	5	5	7	9	—
Karnali Province	1	1	3	3	3	3	3	3	3	—
Koshi Province	1	1	1	1	1	1	1	1	1	—
Lumbini Province	1	3	3	3	5	7	7	9	9	—
Madhesh Province	1	3	5	7	7	9	9	9	11	—
Nepal APF Club	2	2	3	3	3	5	7	9	11	—
Nepal Police Club	0	2	4	5	7	7	9	9	9	—
Sudurpashchim Province	2	2	4	6	8	10	10	10	12	L
Tribhuwan Army Club	2	4	5	7	9	11	13	15	17	W

Win	Loss	Tie	No result	Eliminated

- Note: The total points at the end of each group match are listed.
- Note: Click on the points or results to see the match summary.

== League stage ==
CAN released the fixtures' details on 9 March 2026.

Match 1
21 March 2026
09:00
Scorecard

Koshi Province	v	Madhesh Province

Match abandoned
Shree Ram Janaki International Stadium, Janakpur
Umpires: Dhiraj Poudyal and Ram Kailash Yadav

- No toss.
- No play was possible due to rain.

Match 2
21 March 2026
09:00
Scorecard

Karnali Province; 20/0 (7 overs)	v	Lumbini Province
Rabindra Shahi 9* (29)

No result
Narayani Cricket Ground, Birgunj
Umpires: Himal Giri and Hiralal Raut

- Lumbini Province won the toss and elected to field.
- No further play was possible due to rain.

Match 3
22 March 2026
09:00
Scorecard

Tribhuwan Army Club; 242/8 (47 overs)	v	Nepal Police Club; 221 (45.3 overs)
Basir Ahamad 100 (86); Sarwan Yadav 3/24 (6 overs)		Rashid Khan 60 (82); Naren Saud 3/57 (10 overs)

Tribhuwan Army Club won by 22 runs
Lower Mulpani Cricket Ground, Kageshwari-Manohara
Umpires: Ujjwal Regmi and Durga Subedi
Player of the match: Basir Ahamad (Tribuwan Army Club)

- Tribhuwan Army Club won the toss and elected to bat.
- The match was reduced to 47 overs per side due to rain.
- Basir Ahamad (Tribuwan Army Club) scored his maiden century in Prime Minister Cup.

Match 4
22 March 2026
09:00
Scorecard

Nepal APF Club; 271/8 (50 overs)	v	Bagmati Province; 200 (45.1 overs)
Aasif Sheikh 114 (105); Rijan Dhakal 4/44 (10 overs)		Bibek Magar 34 (64); Rohit Paudel 3/22 (10 overs)

Nepal APF Club won by 71 runs
Mulpani International Cricket Ground, Kageshwari-Manohara
Umpires: Hem Raj Bhatta and Buddhi Pradhan
Player of the match: Aasif Sheikh (Nepal APF Club)

- Bagmati Province won the toss and elected to field.

Match 5
23 March 2026
09:00
Scorecard

Lumbini Province; 249 (49.3 overs)	v	Koshi Province; 101 (31.4 overs)
Dev Khanal 92 (100); Sujan Thapaliya 4/35 (10 overs)		Ankit Subedi 30 (46); Santosh Yadav 4/11 (7 overs)

Lumbini Province won by 148 runs
Shree Ram Janaki International Stadium, Janakpur
Umpires: Mukesh Kumar Sah and Ram Kailash Yadav
Player of the match: Santosh Yadav (Lumbini Province)

- Koshi Province won the toss and elected to field.

Match 6
23 March 2026
09:00
Scorecard

Karnali Province; 119 (32 overs)	v	Sudurpashchim Province; 122/6 (29.2 overs)
Bipin Rawal 33 (61); Hemant Dhami 6/16 (7 overs)		Kiran Thagunna 26 (46); Diwan Pun 2/27 (9 overs)

Sudurpashchim Province won by 4 wickets
Narayani Cricket Ground, Birgunj
Umpires: Pankaj Pandey and Prabin Thapa
Player of the match: Hemant Dhami (Sudurpashchim Province)

- Sudurpashchim Province won the toss and elected to field.
- Hemant Dhami (Sudurpashchim Province) took his maiden five-wicket haul in Prime Minister Cup.

Match 7
24 March 2026
09:00
Scorecard

Bagmati Province; 294/8 (50 overs)	v	Gandaki Province; 124 (31.5 overs)
Ishan Pandey 71 (61); Kamal Pariyar 2/56 (10 overs)		Arjun Kumal 74 (90); Rijan Dhakal 3/31 (8 overs)

Bagmati Province won by 170 runs
Lower Mulpani Cricket Ground, Kageshwari-Manohara
Umpires: Hem Raj Bhatta and Durga Subedi
Player of the match: Ishan Pandey (Bagmati Province)

- Gandaki Province won the toss and elected to field.

Match 8
24 March 2026
09:00
Scorecard

Nepal Police Club; 355/9 (50 overs)	v	Nepal APF Club; 170 (44 overs)
Shankar Rana 61 (54); Amar Routela 2/43 (5 overs)		Nandan Yadav 44* (55); Lalit Rajbanshi 3/28 (10 overs)

Nepal Police Club won by 185 runs
Mulpani International Cricket Ground, Kageshwari-Manohara
Umpires: Buddhi Pradhan and Ujjwal Regmi
Player of the match: Dinesh Kharel (Nepal Police Club)

- Nepal APF Club won the toss and elected to field.
- Nepal Police Club 355/9 (50) was the highest total breaking the previous record of Nepal APF Club 339/6 (50) against Province 2 in the Prime Minister Cup.

Match 9
25 March 2026
09:00
Scorecard

Karnali Province; 151 (39.1 overs)	v	Koshi Province; 135 (44.4 overs)
Bipin Shahi 63 (98); Prem Kamat 4/31 (10 overs)		Dipesh Kandel 26 (66); Dinesh Adhikari 5/27 (8.4 overs)

Karnali Province won by 16 runs
Shree Ram Janaki International Stadium, Janakpur
Umpires: Roshan Mandal and Ram Kailash Yadav
Player of the match: Dinesh Adhikari (Karnali Province)

- Karnali Province won the toss and elected to bat.
- Dinesh Adhikari (Karnali Province) took his maiden five-wicket haul in the Prime Minister Cup.

Match 10
25 March 2026
09:00
Scorecard

Sudurpashchim Province; 160 (43.2 overs)	v	Madhesh Province; 164/5 (33.4 overs)
Abhishek Pal 33 (45); Arniko Yadav 3/25 (7.2 overs)		Arniko Yadav 46* (78); Ashok Dhami 3/26 (7 overs)

Madhesh Province won by 5 wickets
Narayani Cricket Ground, Birgunj
Umpires: Himal Giri and Prabin Thapa
Player of the match: Arniko Yadav (Madhesh Province)

- Madhesh Province won the toss and elected to field.

Match 11
26 March 2026
09:00
Scorecard

Gandaki Province; 209 (49.4 overs)	v	Tribhuwan Army Club; 210/3 (34 overs)
Arjun Kumal 67 (102); Aakash Chand 3/48 (10 overs)		Binod Bhandari 58 (57); Subash Bhandari 2/26 (7 overs)

Tribhuwan Army Club won by 7 wickets
Lower Mulpani Cricket Ground, Kageshwari-Manohara
Umpires: Adhip Pradhan and Durga Subedi
Player of the match: Kushal Malla (Tribhuwan Army Club)

- Gandaki Province won the toss and elected to bat.
- Bhim Sharki (Tribuwan Army Club) scored his 1,000th run in the Prime Minister Cup.

Match 12
26 March 2026
09:00
Scorecard

Bagmati Province; 265 (49.2 overs)	v	Nepal Police Club; 271/3 (44 overs)
Pawan Thapa 79 (101); Dinesh Kharel 3/14 (5 overs)		Shankar Rana 116 (128); Rijan Dhakal 1/36 (10 overs)

Nepal Police Club won by
Mulpani International Cricket Ground, Kageshwari-Manohara
Umpires: Buddhi Pradhan and Sanjay Sigdel
Player of the match: Shankar Rana (Nepal Police Club)

- Bagmati Province won the toss and elected to bat.
- Shankar Rana (Nepal Police Club) scored his maiden century in the Prime Minister Cup.

Match 13
27 March 2026
09:00
Scorecard

Madhesh Province; 124 (38.1 overs)	v	Lumbini Province; 99 (26 overs)
Mayan Yadav 31 (71); Sandesh Thapa 3/13 (5.1 overs)		Sumit Shrestha 30 (34); Bishal Patel 5/24 (9 overs)

Madhesh Province won by 25 runs
Shree Ram Janaki International Stadium, Janakpur
Umpires: Manoj Das and Ram Kailash Yadav
Player of the match: Bishal Patel (Madhesh Province)

- Madhesh Province won the toss and elected to bat.
- Bishal Patel (Madhesh Province) took his maiden five-wicket haul in the Prime Minister Cup.

Match 14
27 March 2026
09:00
Scorecard

Koshi Province; 130 (43.4 overs)	v	Sudurpashchim Province; 131/3 (10.5 overs)
Shiwash Bajgain 25 (50); Hemant Dhami 4/26 (9 overs)		Khadak Bohora 66 (45); Bipin Mahato 2/35 (6 overs)

Sudurpashchim Province won by 7 wickets
Narayani Cricket Ground, Birgunj
Umpires: Anil Chaugai and Himal Giri
Player of the match: Hemant Dhami (Sudurpashchim Province)

- Sudurpashchim Province won the toss and elected to field.

Match 15
28 March 2026
09:00
Scorecard

Nepal APF Club; 85/3 (9.5 overs)	v	Tribhuwan Army Club
Rohit Paudel 26* (17); Kushal Malla 2/26 (4 overs)

No result
Lower Mulpani Cricket Ground, Kageshwari-Manohara
Umpires: Buddhi Pradhan and Ujjwal Regmi

- Tribhuwan Army Club won the toss and elected to field.
- The match was reduced to 20 overs per side due to rain.
- No further play was possible due to rain.

Match 16
28 March 2026
09:00
Scorecard

Gandaki Province; 103/2 (18 overs)	v	Nepal Police Club
Arjun Kumal 34* (54); Lalit Rajbanshi 1/18 (4 overs)

No result
Mulpani International Cricket Ground, Kageshwari-Manohara
Umpires: Adhip Pradhan and Durga Subedi

- Nepal Police Club won the toss and elected to field.
- The match was reduced to 22 overs per side due to rain.
- No further play was possible due to rain.

Match 17
29 March 2026
09:00
Scorecard

Gandaki Province; 150/7 (21 overs)	v	Nepal APF Club; 107 (18.3 overs)
Gaurav BK 37 (36); Abinash Bohara 3/35 (5 overs)		Sumit Maharjan 22 (24); Cibrin Shrestha 3/25 (4 overs)

Gandaki Province won by 43 runs
Lower Mulpani Cricket Ground, Kageshwari-Manohara
Umpires: Dharma Shakya and Durga Subedi
Player of the match: Aprajit Poudel (Gandaki Province)

- Gandaki Province won the toss and elected to bat.
- The match was reduced to 21 overs per side due to rain.

Match 18
29 March 2026
09:00
Scorecard

Bagmati Province; 208/7 (28 overs)	v	Tribhuwan Army Club; 210/7 (27.5 overs)
Ashutosh Ghiraiya 38 (36); Naren Saud 4/26 (6 overs)		Kushal Malla 90* (58); Bibek Magar 2/25 (4 overs)

Tribuwan Army Club won by 3 wickets
Mulpani International Cricket Ground, Kageshwari-Manohara
Umpires: Buddhi Pradhan and Sanjay Sigdel
Player of the match: Kushal Malla (Tribuwan Army Club)

- Tribhuwan Army Club won the toss and elected to field.
- The match was reduced to 28 overs per side due to rain.

Match 19
30 March 2026
09:00
Scorecard

Karnali Province; 129 (31.2 overs)	v	Madhesh Province; 131/5 (24.5 overs)
Rabindra Shahi 40 (51); Aashik Baitha 4/34 (10 overs)		Niraj Yadav 38 (59); Dipendra Rawat 3/40 (8 overs)

Madhesh Province won by 5 wickets
Shree Ram Janaki International Stadium, Janakpur
Umpires: Manoj Das and Ram Kailash Yadav
Player of the match: Aashik Baitha (Madhesh Province)

- Karnali Province won the toss and elected to bat.

Match 20
30 March 2026
09:00
Scorecard

Sudurpashchim Province; 168 (45.4 overs)	v	Lumbini Province; 156 (40.2 overs)
Dipak Bohara 30 (55); Ajay Chauhan 4/25 (9.4 overs)		Santosh Yadav 67 (84); Khadak Bohara 3/13 (5.2 overs)

Sudurpashchim Province won by 12 runs
Narayani Cricket Ground, Birgunj
Umpires: Hiralal Raut and Prabin Thapa
Player of the match: Khadak Bohara (Sudurpashchim Province)

- Lumbini Province won the toss and elected to field.

Match 21
31 March 2026
09:00
Scorecard

Koshi Province; 162 (42.5 overs)	v	Nepal Police Club; 165/4 (33.5 overs)
Sujan Thapaliya 48 (42); Dinesh Kharel 5/21 (7.5 overs)		Aarif Sheikh 81* (79); Bipin Mahato 2/29 (7.5 overs)

Nepal Police Club won by 6 wickets
Narayani Cricket Ground, Birgunj
Umpires: Himal Giri and Pankaj Pandey
Player of the match: Dinesh Kharel (Nepal Police Club)

- Nepal Police Club won the toss and elected to field.
- Dinesh Kharel (Nepal Police Club) took his maiden five-wicket haul in the Prime Minister Cup.

Match 22
1 April 2026
09:00
Scorecard

Bagmati Province; 180 (38.4 overs)	v	Karnali Province; 120 (25.1 overs)
Bibek Magar 56 (80); Diwan Pun 3/28 (8 overs)		Nischal Rawal 31 (42); Sandeep Lamichhane 7/40 (9.1 overs)

Bagmati Province won by 60 runs
Shree Ram Janaki International Stadium, Janakpur
Umpires: Manoj Das and Roshan Mandal
Player of the match: Sandeep Lamichhane (Bagmati Province)

- Karnali Province won the toss and elected to field.
- Sandeep Lamichhane (Bagmati Province) took his maiden five-wicket haul in the Prime Minister Cup.

Match 23
1 April 2026
09:00
Scorecard

Nepal APF Club; 124 (39.4 overs)	v	Lumbini Province; 124 (34 overs)
Avishek Gautam 28 (58); Ajay Chauhan 4/14 (9 overs)		Dev Khanal 45 (64); Rohit Paudel 3/28 (10 overs)

Match tied (Lumbini Province won the Super Over)
Narayani Cricket Ground, Birgunj
Umpires: Hiralal Raut and Prabin Thapa
Player of the match: Santosh Yadav (Lumbini Province)

- Nepal APF Club won the toss and elected to bat.
- Super Over: Lumbini Province 14/1, Nepal APF Club 6/1

Match 24
2 April 2026
09:00
Scorecard

Madhesh Province; 184 (48.3 overs)	v	Tribhuwan Army Club; 185/4 (29.2 overs)
Bishal Shusling 51 (73); Basir Ahamad 3/31 (8.3 overs)		Trit Raj Das 69 (72); Mohammad Aadil Alam 2/25 (3 overs)

Tribhuwan Army Club won by 6 wickets
Shree Ram Janaki International Stadium, Janakpur
Umpires: Manoj Das and Ram Kailash Yadav
Player of the match: Basir Ahamad (Tribhuwan Army Club)

- Tribhuwan Army Club won the toss and elected to field.

Match 25
2 April 2026
09:00
Scorecard

Gandaki Province; 190 (49 overs)	v	Sudurpashchim Province; 191/8 (39.2 overs)
Arjun Kumal 44 (68); Sher Malla 5/42 (10 overs)		Abhishek Pal 66 (93); Bipin Khatri 5/36 (10 overs)

Sudurpashchim Province won by 2 wickets
Narayani Cricket Ground, Birgunj
Umpires: Himal Giri and Pankaj Pandey
Player of the match: Sher Malla (Sudurpashchim Province)

- Gandaki Province won the toss and elected to bat.

Match 26
4 April 2026
09:00
Scorecard

Karnali Province; 107 (36 overs)	v	Nepal APF Club; 108/0 (12 overs)
Arjun Gharti 38 (73); Kamal Singh Airee 4/26 (9 overs)		Aasif Sheikh 65* (38)

Nepal APF Club won by 10 wickets
Shree Ram Janaki International Stadium, Janakpur
Umpires: Aashish Jha and Dhiraj Poudyal
Player of the match: Avishek Gautam (Nepal APF Club)

- Karnali Province won the toss and elected to bat.

Match 27
4 April 2026
09:00
Scorecard

Gandaki Province; 227/7 (50 overs)	v	Koshi Province; 188/9 (50 overs)
Arjun Kumal 102 (141); Dipesh Kandel 4/18 (10 overs)		Dipesh Kandel 52* (73); Cibrin Shrestha 2/35 (7 overs)

Gandaki Province won by 39 runs
Narayani Cricket Ground, Birgunj
Umpires: Rabindra Gupta and Basu Karn
Player of the match: Arjun Kumal (Gandaki Province)

- Gandaki Province won the toss and elected to bat.
- Arjun Kumal (Gandaki Province) became fastest to 1,000th run in the Prime Minister Cup in terms of innings (25).

Match 28
5 April 2026
09:00
Scorecard

Sudurpashchim Province; 209 (42.1 overs)	v	Bagmati Province; 46 (11.2 overs)
Narayan Joshi 75 (68); Pratis GC 4/26 (9.1 overs)		Shubh Kansakar 32 (25); Hemant Dhami 7/14 (6 overs)

Sudurpashchim Province won by 163 runs
Shree Ram Janaki International Stadium, Janakpur
Umpires: Ram Pandey and Naresh Thapa
Player of the match: Hemant Dhami (Sudurpashchim Province)

- Bagmati Province won the toss and elected to field.
- Hemant Dhami (Sudurpashchim Province) took his maiden hat-trick and his second five-wicket haul in the Prime Minister Cup.
- Hemant Dhami's 7/14 was the best bowling figures in an innings for Prime Minister Cup, breaking the previous record of Dipendra Singh Airee's 7/20 against Sudurpashchim Province.

Match 29
5 April 2026
09:00
Scorecard

Lumbini Province; 256 (49.5 overs)	v	Nepal Police Club; 206 (42.5 overs)
Ranjeet Khadka 128 (128); Lalit Rajbanshi 3/47 (10 overs)		Dinesh Kharel 94 (104); Ajay Chauhan 4/37 (9.5 overs)

Lumbini Province won by 50 runs
Narayani Cricket Ground, Birgunj
Umpires: Rabindra Gupta and Kamlesh Thakur
Player of the match: Ranjeet Khadka (Lumbini Province)

- Nepal Police Club won the toss and elected to field.
- Ranjeet Khadka scored his maiden century in the Prime Minister Cup, the first ever for Lumbini Province.

Match 30
6 April 2026
09:00
Scorecard

Nepal APF Club; 259/9 (50 overs)	v	Sudurpashchim Province; 214 (46.3 overs)
Sundeep Jora 55 (45); Sher Malla 3/45 (10 overs)		Ashok Dhami 50 (43); Yuvraj Khatri 5/34 (10 overs)

Nepal APF Club won by 45 runs
Shree Ram Janaki International Stadium, Janakpur
Umpires: Ram Pandey and Dhiraj Poudyal
Player of the match: Yuvraj Khatri (Nepal APF Club)

- Sudurpashchim Province won the toss and elected to field.
- Yuvraj Khatri (Nepal APF Club) took his maiden five-wicket haul in the Prime Minister Cup.

Match 31
6 April 2026
09:00
Scorecard

Tribhuwan Army Club; 268 (48 overs)	v	Karnali Province; 130 (42.1 overs)
Arjun Saud 121 (120); Dinesh Adhikari 4/23 (8.1 overs)		Bipin Shahi 40 (70); Basir Ahamad 3/15 (7.1 overs)

Tribhuwan Army Club won by 138 runs
Narayani Cricket Ground, Birgunj
Umpires: Satish Rajput and Kamlesh Thakur
Player of the match: Arjun Saud (Tribhuwan Army Club)

- Tribhuwan Army Club won the toss and elected to bat.
- Arjun Saud (Tribhuwan Army Club) scored his maiden century in the Prime Minister Cup.
- Sunil Dhamala (Karnali Province) reached 1,000 runs in the Prime Minister Cup, the first ever for Karnali Province.

Match 32
8 April 2026
09:00
Scorecard

Koshi Province; 99 (28.2 overs)	v	Bagmati Province; 100/3 (9 overs)
Sujan Thapaliya 21 (42); Sandeep Lamichhane 5/33 (7.2 overs)		Bibek Magar 61* (28); Bipin Mahato 2/28 (3 overs)

Bagmati Province won by 7 wickets
Shree Ram Janaki International Stadium, Janakpur
Umpires: Mukesh Kumar Sah and Ram Pandey
Player of the match: Sandeep Lamichhane (Bagmati Province)

- Bagmati Province won the toss and elected to field.

Match 33
8 April 2026
09:00
Scorecard

Madhesh Province; 172 (34.5 overs)	v	Gandaki Province; 80/5 (22 overs)
Mayan Yadav 43 (32); Aprajit Poudel 3/26 (7 overs)		Arjun Kumal 49* (65); Bishal Patel 1/8 (4 overs)

Madhesh Province won by 18 runs (DLS method)
Narayani Cricket Ground, Birgunj
Umpires: Kamlesh Thakur and Rabindra Gupta
Player of the match: Bishal Shusling (Madhesh Province)

- Gandaki Province won the toss and elected to field.
- The match was reduced to 35 overs per side due to rain.
- Gandaki Province were set a revised target of 154 runs from 35 overs due to rain and wet outfield.
- Gandaki Province were 18 runs behind in DLS par score when rain interupted the game.

Match 34
9 April 2026
09:00
Scorecard

Sudurpashchim Province; 150 (38.1 overs)	v	Tribhuwan Army Club; 155/3 (20.2 overs)
Narayan Joshi 63 (60); Basir Ahamad 5/35 (9.1 overs)		Binod Bhandari 100 (75); Sher Malla 2/52 (7 overs)

Tribhuwan Army Club won by 7 wickets
Shree Ram Janaki International Stadium, Janakpur
Umpires: Aashish Jha and Dhiraj Poudyal
Player of the match: Binod Bhandari (Tribhuwan Army Club)

- Sudurpashchim Province won the toss and elected to bat.

Match 35
9 April 2026
09:00
Scorecard

Nepal Police Club; 261/8 (50 overs)	v	Karnali Province; 213 (45.2 overs)
Dinesh Kharel 82 (100); Prakash Jaishi 3/57 (10 overs)		Arjun Gharti 46 (56); Lalit Rajbanshi 5/36 (9.2 overs)

Nepal Police Club won by 48 runs
Narayani Cricket Ground, Birgunj
Umpires: Hiralal Raut and Rabindra Gupta
Player of the match: Lalit Rajbanshi (Nepal Police Club)

- Nepal Police Club won the toss and elected to bat.

Match 36
10 April 2026
09:00
Scorecard

Nepal APF Club; 225 (47.5 overs)	v	Koshi Province; 220 (49.5 overs)
Sundeep Jora 72 (94); Sujan Thapaliya 3/38 (10 overs)		Ankit Subedi 72 (67); Avishek Gautam 4/41 (10 overs)

Nepal APF Club won by 5 runs
Shree Ram Janaki International Stadium, Janakpur
Umpires: Ram Pandey and Naresh Thapa
Player of the match: Avishek Gautam (Nepal APF Club)

- Koshi Province won the toss and elected to field.

Match 37
10 April 2026
09:00
Scorecard

Bagmati Province; 208 (48.4 overs)	v	Madhesh Province; 173 (34.3 overs)
Uttam Magar 44 (75); Pawan Sarraf 3/31 (10 overs)		Mayan Yadav 40 (50); Pratis GC 5/55 (9.3 overs)

Bagmati Province won by 35 runs
Narayani Cricket Ground, Birgunj
Umpires: Basu Karn and Kamlesh Thakur
Player of the match: Pratis GC (Bagmati Province)

- Madhesh Province won the toss and elected to field.
- Pratish GC (Bagmati Province) took his maiden five-wicket haul in the Prime Minister Cup.

Match 38
12 April 2026
09:00
Scorecard

Sudurpashchim Province; 191 (40.4 overs)	v	Nepal Police Club; 135 (35.1 overs)
Narayan Joshi 82 (80); Dinesh Kharel 4/17 (9 overs)		Gulshan Jha 50 (64); Hemant Dhami 3/21 (6 overs)

Sudurpashchim Province won by 56 runs
Shree Ram Janaki International Stadium, Janakpur
Umpires: Ram Pandey and Dhiraj Poudyal
Player of the match: Narayan Joshi (Sudurpashchim Province)

- Nepal Police Club won the toss and elected to field.

Match 39
12 April 2026
09:00
Scorecard

Lumbini Province; 207 (45 overs)	v	Gandaki Province; 211/2 (44.1 overs)
Santosh Yadav 82 (77); Bipin Khatri 4/37 (9 overs)		Arjun Kumal 103* (130); Dinesh Bohora 1/20 (3 overs)

Gandaki Province won by 8 wickets
Narayani Cricket Ground, Birgunj
Umpires: Basu Karn and Rabindra Gupta
Player of the match: Arjun Kumal (Gandaki Province)

- Lumbini Province won the toss and elected to bat.

Match 40
13 April 2026
09:00
Scorecard

Tribhuwan Army Club; 362/8 (50 overs)	v	Koshi Province; 177 (36 overs)
Binod Bhandari 189 (150); Bipin Mahato 3/69 (10 overs)		Prabhat Rai 38 (45); Aakash Chand 3/42 (7 overs)

Tribhuwan Army Club won by 185 runs
Shree Ram Janaki International Stadium, Janakpur
Umpires: Ram Pandey and Naresh Thapa
Player of the match: Binod Bhandari (Tribhuwan Army Club)

- Koshi Province won the toss and elected to field.
- Tribhuwan Army Club advanced to the Final as a result of this match.

Match 41
13 April 2026
09:00
Scorecard

Nepal APF Club; 390/4 (50 overs)	v	Madhesh Province; 316/8 (50 overs)
Aasif Sheikh 208 (142); Rupesh Singh 3/80 (10 overs)		Mohammad Aadil Alam 87 (43); Avishek Gautam 3/80 (10 overs)

Nepal APF Club won by 74 runs
Narayani Cricket Ground, Birgunj
Umpires: Rabindra Gupta and Kamlesh Thakur
Player of the match: Aasif Sheikh (Nepal APF Club)

- Madhesh Province won the toss and elected to field.
- Aasif Sheikh (Nepal APF Club) became the first player to score a double century in the Prime Minister Cup.
- Nepal APF Club 390/4 (50) is the highest total breaking the previous record of Nepal Police Club 355/9 (50) against Nepal APF Club in the Prime Minister Cup.
- Sudurpashchim Province advanced to the Final as a result of this match.

Match 42
14 April 2026
09:00
Scorecard

Lumbini Province; 233 (45.2 overs)	v	Bagmati Province; 199 (44 overs)
Aakash Tripathi 72 (72); Bibek Magar 3/33 (7 overs)		Bibek Magar 45 (49); Nirmal Gurung 5/27 (10 overs)

Lumbini Province won by 34 runs
Shree Ram Janaki International Stadium, Janakpur
Umpires: Dhiraj Poudyal and Mukesh Kumar Sah
Player of the match: Nirmal Gurung (Lumbini Province)

- Lumbini Province won the toss and elected to bat.
- Nirmal Gurung (Lumbini Province) took his maiden five-wicket haul in the Prime Minister Cup.

Match 43
14 April 2026
09:00
Scorecard

Karnali Province; 72 (25.2 overs)	v	Gandaki Province; 74/1 (13 overs)
Prakash Jaishi 15* (36); Bipin Khatri 5/18 (10 overs)		Cibrin Shrestha 40* (34); Bipin Sharma 1/15 (5 overs)

Gandaki Province won by 9 wickets
Narayani Cricket Ground, Birgunj
Umpires: Satish Rajput and Hiralal Raut
Player of the match: Bipin Khatri (Gandaki Province)

- Gandaki Province won the toss and elected to field.

Match 44
15 April 2026
09:00
Scorecard

Lumbini Province; 138 (39.2 overs)	v	Tribhuwan Army Club; 141/9 (25.2 overs)
Ranjeet Khadka 28 (55); Kushal Malla 4/26 (8 overs)		Kushal Malla 41 (36); Santosh Yadav 5/17 (6 overs)

Tribuwan Army Club won by 1 wicket
Shree Ram Janaki International Stadium, Janakpur
Umpires: Aashish Jha and Mukesh Kumar Sah
Player of the match: Kushal Malla (Tribuwan Army Club)

- Lumbini Province won the toss and elected to bat.
- Santosh Yadav (Lumbini Province) took his maiden five-wicket haul in Prime Minister Cup.

Match 45
15 April 2026
09:00
Scorecard

Nepal Police Club; 130 (40.3 overs)	v	Madhesh Province; 131/6 (24.1 overs)
Kushal Bhurtel 39 (42); Aashik Baitha 3/21 (10 overs)		Arniko Yadav 65* (44); Gulsan Jha 3/20 (5 overs)

Madhesh Province won by 4 wickets
Narayani Cricket Ground, Birgunj
Umpires: Rabindra Gupta and Kamlesh Thakur
Player of the match: Arniko Yadav (Madhesh Province)

- Madhesh Province won the toss and elected to field.

== Final ==
Final
17 April 2026
09:00
Scorecard

Sudurpashchim Province; 161 (39.4 overs)	v	Tribhuwan Army Club; 164/5 (34.2 overs)
Ashok Dhami 43 (46); Aakash Chand 3/31 (9 overs)		Imran Sheikh 46* (82); Hemant Dhami 2/34 (6 overs)

Tribuwan Army Club won by 5 wickets
Narayani Cricket Ground, Birgunj
Umpires: Ram Pandey and Hiralal Raut
Player of the match: Basir Ahamad (Tribuwan Army Club)

- Sudurpashchim Province won the toss and elected to bat.

== Broadcasters ==
Cricket Association of Nepal announced the following list of broadcasters for the 2026 editions of the Prime Minister Cup.

Country	Years	Channels
Nepal/Rest of the World	2025–26	Kasthamandap Sports's channel on YouTube
Nepal/Rest of the World	2025–26	STYX Sports & STYX Nepal
Nepal/Rest of the World	2025–26	Kasthmandap Gold & Kasthmandap Television

== Statistics and awards ==
=== Most runs ===
Runs	Player	Team	Mat	Inns	Ave	SR	HS	100	50	4s	6s
504	Arjun Kumal	Gandaki Province	9	9	84.00	72.41	103*	2	2	56	2
457	Aasif Sheikh	Nepal APF Club	9	9	57.12	127.65	208	2	1	49	22
404	Binod Bhandari	Tribhuwan Army Club	10	9	44.88	114.44	189	2	1	49	12
333	Dinesh Kharel	Nepal Police Club	9	8	41.62	84.30	94	0	4	34	15
332	Narayan Joshi	Sudurpashchim Province	10	9	41.50	91.96	82	0	3	15	26
Source: ESPNcricinfo

=== Most wickets ===
Wkts	Player	Team	Mat	Inns	BBI	Avg	Econ	SR	4w	5w
27	Hemant Dhami	Sudurpashchim Province	10	10	7/14	10.51	3.94	16.00	1	2
25	Sandeep Lamichhane	Bagmati Province	9	9	7/40	14.52	4.40	19.76	1	2
23	Sher Malla	Sudurpashchim Province	10	10	5/42	15.95	4.26	22.43	0	1
21	Santhosh Yadav	Lumbini Province	9	8	5/17	12.33	3.92	18.85	2	1
19	Basir Ahamad	Tribhuwan Army Club	10	10	5/35	14.78	3.84	23.05	0	1
19	Avishek Gautam	Nepal APF Club	9	8	4/34	18.73	5.39	20.84	2	0
Source: ESPNcricinfo

=== End of season awards ===
Award(s)	Player(s)	Team(s)	Ref.
Emerging Player	Aashik Baitha	Madhesh Province	
Best Bowler	Hemant Dhami	Sudurpashchim Province	
Best Batter	Arjun Kumal	Gandaki Province	
Player of the Tournament	Santhosh Yadav	Lumbini Province	
