= 2026 Nepal Tri-Nation Series (April) =

Seventeenth tri-nation series round in 2024-26 CWCL2

- Part of 2024–2026 Cricket World Cup League 2
- Round 17
- Date: 25 April – 5 May 2026
- Location: Nepal
Teams
Nepal	Oman	United Arab Emirates
Captains
Rohit Paudel	Jatinder Singh	Muhammad Waseem
Most runs
Dipendra Singh Airee (268)	Jatinder Singh (197)	Harpreet Singh (212)
Most wickets
Sandeep Lamichhane (8) Sompal Kami (8)	Nadeem Khan (8)	Junaid Siddique (12)

The 2026 Nepal Tri-Nation Series in April was the seventeenth round of the 2024–2026 Cricket World Cup League 2 cricket tournament, which was held in Nepal from 25 April to 5 May 2026. It was a tri-nation series contested by the men's national teams of Nepal, Oman and the United Arab Emirates. The series was originally scheduled to take place from 10 to 20 March 2026, but was postponed due to the West Asia conflict. All the matches were played as One Day International (ODI) fixtures.

All matches, excluding the warm-up matches, were played at the Tribhuvan University International Cricket Ground in Kirtipur.

== T20I series ==
Ahead of the League 2 fixtures, Nepal played two Twenty20 International (T20I) matches against United Arab Emirates. The series was drawn 1–1.

United Arab Emirates men's cricket team in Nepal in 2026
	Nepal	United Arab Emirates
- Dates: 20 – 21 April 2026
Captains	Dipendra Singh Airee	Muhammad Waseem

Twenty20 International series
- Results: 2-match series drawn 1–1
Most runs	Kushal Bhurtel (100)	Akshdeep Nath (70)
Most wickets	Sandeep Lamichhane (6)	Zuhaib Zubair (3)

=== Squads ===
Nepal	United Arab Emirates
Dipendra Singh Airee (c); Basir Ahamad; Shahab Alam; Kushal Bhurtel; Lokesh Bam (wk); Hemant Dhami; Gulshan Jha; Sundeep Jora; Sandeep Lamichhane; Kushal Malla; Sher Malla; Arjun Saud (wk); Aarif Sheikh; Nandan Yadav; Santosh Yadav	Muhammad Waseem (c); Muhammad Arfan; Haider Ali; Jash Giyanani; Muhammad Jawadullah; Nilansh Keswani; Sohaib Khan; Khuzaima Tanveer; Ajay Kumar; Akshdeep Nath; Muhammad Shahdad; Alishan Sharafu; Aryansh Sharma (wk); Junaid Siddique; Harpreet Singh; Adeeb Usmani (wk); Zuhaib Zubair

Nepal named Pratish GC, Narayan Joshi and Rashid Khan as reserves. The United Arab Emirates squad for the tour included five players who became the first cricketers to be granted citizenship through naturalisation (rather than becoming eligible through residency): Khuzaima Tanveer, Ajay Kumar, Akshdeep Nath, Harpreet Singh and Adeeb Usmani.

=== Fixtures ===
The Cricket Association of Nepal (CAN) announced the schedule for the series on 10 April 2026.

==== 1st T20I ====
20 April 2026
17:00 (D/N)
Scorecard

Nepal; 122/8 (18.5 overs)	v	United Arab Emirates; 78/4 (8.5 overs)
Dipendra Singh Airee 32* (35); Zuhaib Zubair 3/29 (4 overs)		Muhammad Waseem 33 (15); Sandeep Lamichhane 3/8 (2 overs)

United Arab Emirates won by 6 wickets (DLS method)
Tribhuvan University International Cricket Ground, Kirtipur
Umpires: Buddhi Pradhan (Nep) and Durga Subedi (Nep)
Player of the match: Zuhaib Zubair (UAE)

- Nepal won the toss and elected to bat.
- United Arab Emirates were set a revised target of 78 runs in 10 overs due to rain.
- Hemant Dhami (Nep), Khuzaima Tanveer, Akshdeep Nath, Harpreet Singh and Adeeb Usmani (UAE) all made their T20I debuts.

==== 2nd T20I ====
21 April 2026
17:00 (D/N)
Scorecard

United Arab Emirates; 128/8 (20 overs)	v	Nepal; 129/2 (15.5 overs)
Akshdeep Nath 53* (42); Sandeep Lamichhane 3/6 (4 overs)		Kushal Bhurtel 84* (57); Muhammad Arfan 1/19 (3 overs)

Nepal won by 8 wickets
Tribhuvan University International Cricket Ground, Kirtipur
Umpires: Buddhi Pradhan (Nep) and Vinay Kumar Jha (Nep)
Player of the match: Kushal Bhurtel (Nep)

- Nepal won the toss and elected to field.
- Santosh Yadav (Nep) and Ajay Kumar (UAE) both made their T20I debuts.

== Tour matches ==
Ahead of the League 2 series, Oman played two 50-over warm-up matches against Nepal A at the Mulpani International Cricket Ground. The Cricket Association of Nepal (CAN) announced the fixtures on 9 April 2026.

Warm-up matches

Warm-up match 1
22 April 2026
09:30
Scorecard

Oman; 280/9 (50 overs)	v	Nepal A 210 (44.4 overs)
Mujibur Ali 72 (85); Aakash Chand 4/31 (9 overs)		Ishan Pandey 52 (62); Shakeel Ahmed 3/8 (4 overs)

Oman won by 70 runs
Mulpani International Cricket Ground, Kageshwari-Manohara
Umpires: Himal Giri (Nep) and Sanjay Sigdel (Nep)
Player of the match: Mujibur Ali (Oma)

- Oman won the toss and elected to bat.

Warm-up match 2
24 April 2026
09:30
Scorecard

Nepal A 284/7 (50 overs)	v	Oman; 169 (36.3 overs)
Ishan Pandey 69 (78); Jiten Ramanandi 2/39 (9 overs)		Mujibur Ali 43 (66); Yuvraj Khatri 3/16 (6 overs)

Nepal A won by 115 runs
Mulpani International Cricket Ground, Kageshwari-Manohara
Umpires: Hem Raj Bhatta (Nep) and Rabindra Gupta (Nep)
Player of the match: Ishan Pandey (Nepal A)

- Oman won the toss and elected to field.

== League 2 series ==
=== Squads ===
Nepal	Oman	United Arab Emirates
Rohit Paudel (c); Dipendra Singh Airee (vc); Basir Ahamad; Binod Bhandari (wk); Kushal Bhurtel; Gulshan Jha; Sompal Kami; Karan KC; Arjun Kumal; Sandeep Lamichhane; Lalit Rajbanshi; Bhim Sharki; Aarif Sheikh; Aasif Sheikh (wk); Nandan Yadav	Jatinder Singh (c); Vinayak Shukla (vc, wk); Shakeel Ahmed; Mujibur Ali; Wasim Ali; Hashir Dafedar; Shah Faisal; Hasnain Ul Wahab; Muhammed Imran; Nadeem Khan; Pruthvikumar Machhi; Hammad Mirza (wk); Ashish Odedara; Jiten Ramanandi; Hassnain Shah; Bukkapatnam Siddharth	Muhammad Waseem (c); Haider Ali; Jash Giyanani; Muhammad Jawadullah; Nilansh Keswani; Sohaib Khan; Khuzaima Tanveer; Ajay Kumar; Akshdeep Nath; Muhammad Shahdad; Aryansh Sharma (wk); Junaid Siddique; Harpreet Singh; Adeeb Usmani (wk); Zuhaib Zubair

Nepal named Rijan Dhakal, Hemant Dhami, Dev Khanal, Sher Malla and Ishan Pandey as reserves.

The United Arab Emirates squad for the tour included five players who became the first cricketers to be granted citizenship through naturalisation (rather than becoming eligible through residency): Khuzaima Tanveer, Ajay Kumar, Akshdeep Nath, Harpreet Singh and Adeeb Usmani.

Despite not being named in the squad announcement, Hasnain Ul Wahab made his ODI debut against Nepal in the 6th ODI.

=== Fixtures ===
The Cricket Association of Nepal (CAN) announced the revised fixtures on 7 April 2026.

==== 1st ODI ====
25 April 2026
09:30
Scorecard

Nepal; 200 (48.2 overs)	v	United Arab Emirates; 163 (48.2 overs)
Dipendra Singh Airee 75 (90); Junaid Siddique 3/33 (9.2 overs)		Harpreet Singh 39 (52); Karan KC 4/19 (9.2 overs)

Nepal won by 37 runs
Tribhuvan University International Cricket Ground, Kirtipur
Umpires: Durga Subedi (Nep) and Prageeth Rambukwella (SL)
Player of the match: Dipendra Singh Airee (Nep)

- United Arab Emirates won the toss and elected to field.
- Nilansh Keswani, Khuzaima Tanveer, Ajay Kumar, Akshdeep Nath, Harpreet Singh and Adeeb Usmani (UAE) all made their ODI debuts.

==== 2nd ODI ====
27 April 2026
09:30
Scorecard

United Arab Emirates; 268/7 (50 overs)	v	Oman; 243 (47.5 overs)
Aryansh Sharma 105 (125); Shah Faisal 3/62 (10 overs)		Vinayak Shukla 58* (58); Ajay Kumar 6/35 (9.5 overs)

United Arab Emirates won by 25 runs
Tribhuvan University International Cricket Ground, Kirtipur
Umpires: Durga Subedi (Nep) and Raveendra Wimalasiri (SL)
Player of the match: Ajay Kumar (UAE)

- Oman won the toss and elected to field.
- Aryansh Sharma (UAE) scored his first century in ODIs.
- Ajay Kumar (UAE) took his first five-wicket haul in ODIs.

==== 3rd ODI ====
29 April 2026
09:30
Scorecard

Oman; 305/8 (50 overs)	v	Nepal; 155/7 (36.5 overs)
Jatinder Singh 130 (96); Sompal Kami 4/59 (9 overs)		Dipendra Singh Airee 60 (62); Nadeem Khan 3/42 (10 overs)

Oman won by 102 runs (DLS method)
Tribhuvan University International Cricket Ground, Kirtipur
Umpires: Prageeth Rambukwella (SL) and Raveendra Wimalasiri (SL)
Player of the match: Jatinder Singh (Oma)

- Oman won the toss and elected to bat.
- No further play was possible due to rain.
- Nadeem Khan (Oma) made his ODI debut.
- Bhim Sharki (Nep) scored his 1,000th run in ODIs.

==== 4th ODI ====
1 May 2026
09:30
Scorecard

Nepal; 289/7 (50 overs)	v	United Arab Emirates; 248/8 (38 overs)
Dipendra Singh Airee 100 (94); Ajay Kumar 2/47 (10 overs)		Muhammad Shahdad 65 (72); Sandeep Lamichhane 3/36 (8 overs)

Nepal won by 6 runs (DLS method)
Tribhuvan University International Cricket Ground, Kirtipur
Umpires: Durga Subedi (Nep) and Raveendra Wimalasiri (SL)
Player of the match: Dipendra Singh Airee (Nep)

- Nepal won the toss and elected to bat.
- United Arab Emirates were set a revised target of 255 runs in 38 overs due to rain.
- Arjun Kumal (Nep) made his ODI debut.
- Sandeep Lamichhane (Nep) became the first bowler to take 100 wickets in Cricket World Cup League 2.

==== 5th ODI ====
3 May 2026
09:30
Scorecard

United Arab Emirates; 308/8 (47 overs)	v	Oman; 254 (39.5 overs)
Harpreet Singh 77 (65); Muhammed Imran 3/70 (9 overs)		Jiten Ramanandi 91* (62); Junaid Siddique 6/49 (7.5 overs)

United Arab Emirates won by 54 runs
Tribhuvan University International Cricket Ground, Kirtipur
Umpires: Prageeth Rambukwella (SL) and Durga Subedi (Nep)
Player of the match: Junaid Siddique (UAE)

- United Arab Emirates won the toss and elected to bat.
- The match was reduced to 47 overs per side due to rain.
- Jash Giyanani (UAE) made his ODI debut.
- Junaid Siddique (UAE) took his first five-wicket haul in ODIs.

==== 6th ODI ====
5 May 2026
09:30
Scorecard

Nepal; 256 (49.5 overs)	v	Oman; 175 (39.5 overs)
Aasif Sheikh 94 (97); Nadeem Khan 3/41 (10 overs)		Vinayak Shukla 36 (41); Gulshan Jha 5/38 (9 overs)

Nepal won by 81 runs
Tribhuvan University International Cricket Ground, Kirtipur
Umpires: Prageeth Rambukwella (SL) and Raveendra Wimalasiri (SL)
Player of the match: Aasif Sheikh (Nep)

- Nepal won the toss and elected to bat.
- Hasnain Ul Wahab (Oma) made his ODI debut.
