= Narayani Cricket Ground =

- Birgunj Cricket Ground
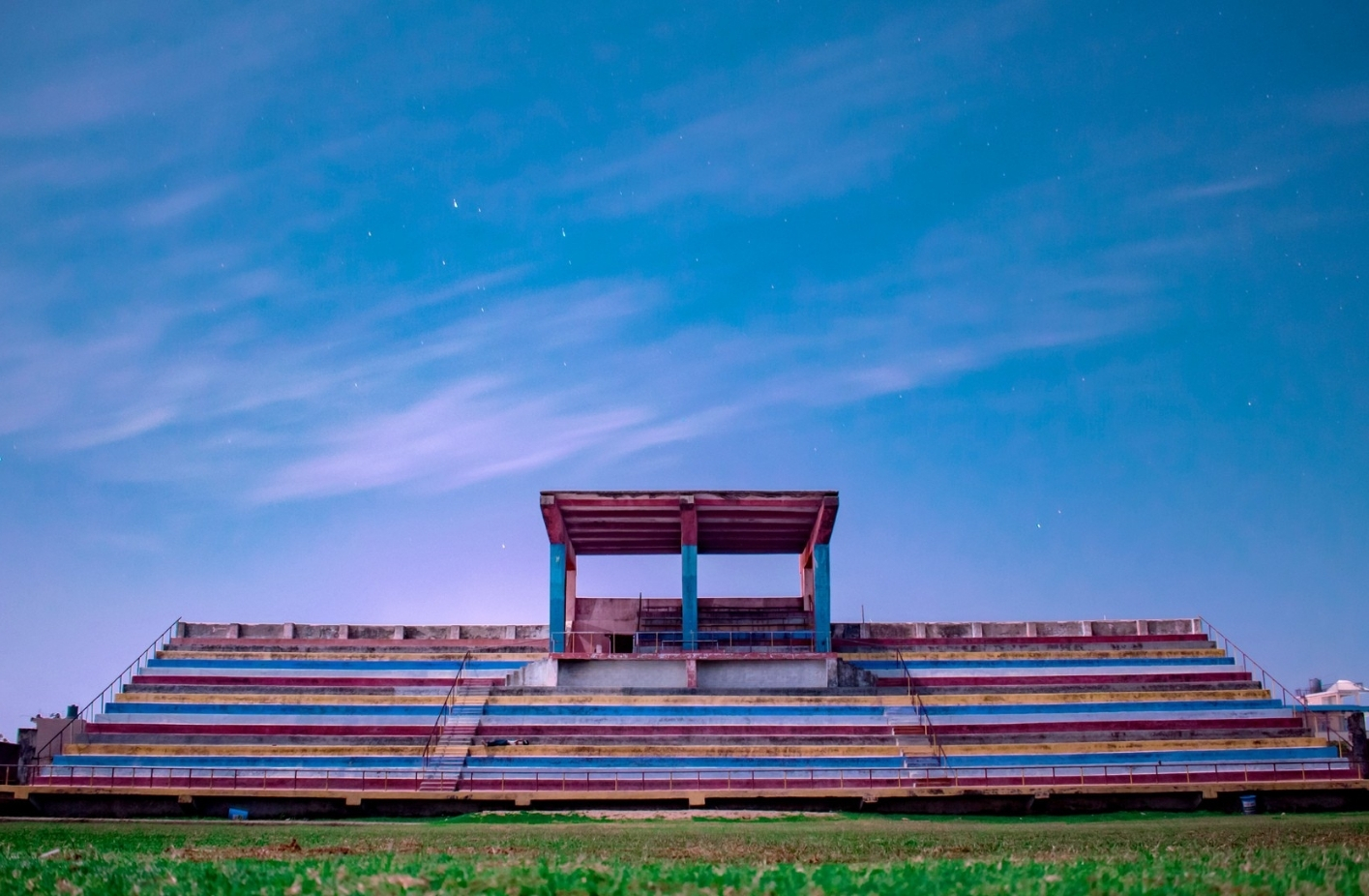
- Narayani Rangasala in 2019
- Interactive map of Narayani Cricket Ground
- Location: Birgunj, Madhesh Province, Nepal
- Country: Nepal
- Coordinates: 27°01′54″N 84°53′38″E
- Capacity: 5,000
- Owner: Government of Nepal
- Operator: Madhesh Province Cricket Association
- Tenants: Madhesh Province cricket team Madhesh Province women's cricket team
- End names
- n/a n/a
- As of 15 October 2024; Source: Narayani Cricket Ground

The Narayani Cricket Ground (Nepali: नारायणी क्रिकेट मैदान)', Commonly known as Birgunj Cricket Ground is a cricket ground in Birgunj, Madhesh Province, Nepal.

Nepal Pro Club Championship 2023 was organized in this ground.

== Events ==
=== National ===
Event	Year	Organiser	Dates	Ref.
Jay Trophy	2025	CAN	5–16 December 2025	
Nepal Pro Club Championship	2023	CAN	21–30 December 2023	
Prime Minister Cup	2026	CAN	21 March – 18 April 2026	

=== International ===
Event	Year	Organiser	Dates	Ref.
Bilateral series with Delhi U-19	2025	CAN	25–27 March 2025	

== See also ==
- List of cricket grounds in Nepal
