= Gautam Buddha Cup =

Cricket competition in Nepal

- Countries: Nepal
- Administrator: Bagmati Province Cricket Association; Cricket Association of Nepal
- Format: Twenty20
- First edition: 2020
- Tournament format: Round-robin and Final
- Current champion: Team Rapti
- TV: Action Sports HD
- 2020 Gautam Buddha Cup

The Gautam Buddha Cup is a cricket tournament in Nepal that is organized by the Bagmati Province Cricket Association. The Cricket Association of Nepal provides technical assistance for the tournament.

The 2020 Gautam Buddha Cup was a T20 cricket tournament that began on December 12. The tournament was held at the Gautam Buddha International Cricket Stadium (GBICS) in Namuna Ground, Chitwan. It was co-sponsored by the Chitwan District Cricket Association, and was telecast live on Action Sports HD. The tournament was organized to promote the stadium and to rejuvenate cricket activities that were stalled due to the COVID-19 crisis.
