= Shree Ram Janaki International Stadium =

Sports Stadium in Janakpur, Nepal

Shree Ram Janaki International Cricket Stadium
- Interactive map of Shree Ram Janaki International Cricket Stadium

Ground information
- Location: Janakpur, Madhesh Province
- Country: Nepal
- Coordinates: 26°44′50.7″N 85°55′45.7″E
- Establishment: 2023; 3 years ago
- Capacity: 60,000+
- Contractor: Construction cost US$27 million
- Operator: Madhesh Province Cricket Association
- Tenants: Madhesh Province cricket team, Madhesh Province women's cricket team
- End names
- n/a n/a

International information
- As of 28 December 2024; Source: Espncricinfo

Shree Ram Janaki International Stadium is a multi-purpose stadium under development in Janakpur, Nepal. The stadium is being built on 17 bighas of land in Rajaul, Janakpur. It will have a capacity of over 60,000. The Madhesh Pradesh Government has announced to invest Rs. 2 Billion on this stadium.

== Events ==
=== National ===
Event	Year	Organiser	Dates
Jay Trophy	2025	CAN	5–16 December 2025
2026 Prime Minister Cup	2026	CAN	21 March – 18 April 2026

== See also ==
- Cricket in Nepal
- Cricket Association of Nepal
- Nepal national cricket team
- List of cricket grounds by capacity
