= 2020 Gautam Buddha Cup =

Cricket tournament in Nepal

- Dates: 12 – 15 December 2020
- Administrator(s): Cricket Association of Nepal (CAN); Bagmati Province Cricket Association
- Cricket format: Twenty20 cricket
- Tournament format(s): Round robin and Final
- Champions: Team Rapti
- Player of the series: Kushal Bhurtel (Team Rapti)
- Most runs: Kushal Bhurtel (110)
- Most wickets: Shahab Alam; Abinash Bohara (7 wickets each)

The 2020 Gautam Buddha Cup was a Twenty20 cricket tournament in Nepal. It was played at the Gautam Buddha International Cricket Stadium, Chitwan, from 12 December to 15 December 2020.

== Squads ==
| Team Bagmati | Team Narayani | Team Rapti |
|---|---|---|
| Gyanendra Malla (c); Anil Kumar Sah; Sompal Kami; Rashid Khan; Lalit Rajbanshi; Sagar Dhakal; Rohit Paudel; Pawan Sarraf; Sunil Dhamala; Bikram Sob; Pradeep Airee; Bhim Sharki; Aakash Thapa; Sangharsha Paudel | ~~Paras Khadka~~; Subash Khakurel (c) (Note: Karan KC captained the team in the last league match.); Karan K.C.; Kishore Mahato; Sushan Bhari; Shahab Alam; Aarif Sheikh; Sandeep Jora; Rit Gautam; Sidhhant Lohani; Ishan Pandey; Raju Rijal; Dipesh Shrestha; Bibek Yadav | Binod Bhandari (c); Kushal Bhurtel; Abinash Bohora; Kamal Airee; Surya Tamang; Bhuwan Karki; Sharad Vesawkar; Lokesh Bam; Aasif Sheikh; Jitendra Mukhiya; Amit Shrestha; Sumit Maharjan; Hari Chaudhan; Swapnil Adhikari |

Originally, Paras Khadka was the captain of Team Narayani. However, he tested positive for COVID-19 few days before the tournament was about to start. He was withdrawn from the squad and Subash Khakurel was named the captain in his absence.

== Points Table ==
| Pos | Team | Pld | W | L | Pts |
|---|---|---|---|---|---|
| 1 | Team Rapti | 2 | 2 | 0 | 4 |
| 2 | Team Narayani | 2 | 1 | 1 | 2 |
| 3 | Team Bagmati | 2 | 0 | 2 | 0 |

The top two teams qualified for the final.

== Matches ==
=== League Matches ===
12 December 2020
11:00 AM
Scorecard

| Team Bagmati; 117/8 (20 overs) | v | Team Narayani; 117/9 (20 overs) |
| Bikram Sob 37* (31); Shahab Alam 3/23 (4 overs) | | Aarif Sheikh 44 (45); Sompal Kami 2/27 (4 overs) |

Match Tied
(Team Narayani won the Super Over)
Gautam Buddha International Cricket Stadium
Player of the match: Karan KC (Team Narayani)

- Team Narayani won the toss and elected to field.
- Super Over: Team Narayani 25/0, Team Bagmati 20/0

13 December 2020
9:45 AM
Scorecard

| Team Rapti; 129/9 (20 overs) | v | Team Bagmati; 118 (19.4 overs) |
| Amit Shrestha 26 (33); Sagar Dhakal 2/15 (4 overs) | | Sompal Kami 35 (28); Jitendra Mukhiya 2/11 (3.4 overs) |

Team Rapti won by 11 runs
Gautam Buddha International Cricket Stadium
Player of the match: Abinash Bohara (Team Rapti)

- Team Bagmati won the toss and elected to field.

14 December 2020
11:00 AM
Scorecard

| Team Narayani; 138/8 (20 overs) | v | Team Rapti; 139/9 (19.5 overs) |
| Kishore Mahato 36* (14); Surya Tamang 2/27 (4 overs) | | Kushal Bhurtel 65 (41); Karan KC 3/24 |

Team Rapti won by 1 wicket
Gautam Buddha International Cricket Stadium
Player of the match: Kushal Bhurtel (Team Rapti)

- Team Narayani won the toss and elected to bat.

=== Final ===
15 December 2020
11:45 AM
Scorecard

| Team Rapti; 143/8 (20 overs) | v | Team Narayani; 134/9 (20 overs) |
| Kushal Bhurtel 42 (31); Shahab Alam 3/19 (4 overs) | | Aarif Sheikh 48 (31); Abinash Bohara 3/27 (3 overs) |

Team Rapti won by 9 runs
Gautam Buddha International Cricket Stadium
Player of the match: Kushal Bhurtel (Team Rapti)

- Team Narayani won the toss and elected to field.

== Statistics ==
=== Most runs ===
| Player | Mat | Inn | Avg | SR | Runs |
|---|---|---|---|---|---|
| Kushal Bhurtel | 3 | 3 | 36.66 | 146.66 | 110 |
| Aarif Sheikh | 3 | 3 | 33.33 | 113.63 | 100 |
| Binod Bhandari | 3 | 3 | 19.33 | 118.36 | 58 |

Source: ESPNcricinfo

=== Most wickets ===
| Player | Mat | Inn | Econ | Wickets |
|---|---|---|---|---|
| Shahab Alam | 3 | 3 | 4.00 | 7 |
| Abinash Bohara | 3 | 3 | 7.27 | 7 |
| Sushan Bhari | 3 | 3 | 4.16 | 5 |

Source: ESPNcricinfo
