= 2024 Hong Kong Tri-Nation Series =

International cricket tournament

- Date: 10–13 March 2024
- Location: Hong Kong
- Result: Papua New Guinea won the tournament
- Player of the series: (Papua New Guinea) Tony Ura
Teams
Hong Kong	Nepal	Papua New Guinea
Captains
Nizakat Khan	Rohit Paudel	Assad Vala
Most runs
Anshuman Rath (92)	Sundeep Jora (73)	Tony Ura (125)
Most wickets
Nasrulla Rana (3)	Kushal Bhurtel (7)	Assad Vala (4); Sese Bau (4); Kabua Morea (4)

The 2024 Hong Kong Tri-Nation Series was a Twenty20 International cricket tournament that was played in March 2024 in Hong Kong. The participating teams were Hong Kong, Nepal and Papua New Guinea.

The tournament was played in a single round-robin format. The top two sides in the group stage proceeded to the final, while the last team played in a third-place game against Hong Kong A. All of the matches were played at the Mission Road Ground.

The hosts failed to progress to the final after their match against Nepal ended in no result due to rain, and they lost to Papua New Guinea by 10 wickets. Hong Kong defeated Hong Kong A in the 3rd place play-off by 70 runs. Papua New Guinea defeated Nepal in the final by 86 runs.

== Squads ==
Hong Kong	Nepal	Papua New Guinea
Nizakat Khan (c); Yasim Murtaza (vc); Zeeshan Ali (wk); Jamie Atkinson (wk); Martin Coetzee; Babar Hayat; Ateeq Iqbal; Aizaz Khan; Anas Khan; Ehsan Khan; Nasrulla Rana; Dhananjay Rao; Anshuman Rath; Ayush Shukla	Rohit Paudel (c); Lokesh Bam; Binod Bhandari (wk); Kushal Bhurtel; Abinash Bohara; Aakash Chand; Sagar Dhakal; Pratis GC; Gulshan Jha; Sundeep Jora; Karan KC; Rashid Khan; Aarif Sheikh; Bibek Yadav	Assad Vala (c); Charles Amini; Sese Bau; Kiplin Doriga (wk); Jack Gardner; John Kariko; Semo Kamea; Hiri Hiri; Kabua Morea; Alei Nao; Nosaina Pokana; Chad Soper; Lega Siaka; Tony Ura (wk); Hila Vare (wk); Norman Vanua

== Friendship Cup ==
Friendship Cup
	Hong Kong	Nepal
- Date: 9 March 2024
Captains	Nizakat Khan	Rohit Paudel

Twenty20 International series
- Results: Hong Kong won the 1-match series 1–0
Most runs	Babar Hayat (110)	Binod Bhandari (42)
Most wickets	Aizaz Khan (4)	Aakash Chand (3)

Hong Kong and Nepal played a one-off Twenty20 International match on 9 March 2024 for the Friendship Cup, celebrating the relationship between Cricket Hong Kong, China and the Cricket Association of Nepal. Hong Kong won the match by 73 runs.

=== Only T20I ===
9 March 2024
13:30
Scorecard

Hong Kong; 212/6 (20 overs)	v	Nepal; 139 (16.4 overs)
Babar Hayat 110 (49); Aakash Chand 3/27 (3 overs)		Binod Bhandari 42 (22); Aizaz Khan 4/26 (3.4 overs)

Hong Kong won by 73 runs
Mission Road Ground, Mong Kok
Umpires: Niaz Ali (HK) and John Prakash (HK)
Player of the match: Babar Hayat (HK)

- Nepal won the toss and elected to field.
- Aakash Chand (Nep) made his T20I debut.

== Round-robin ==
=== Points table ===
Pos	Team	Pld	W	L	NR	Pts	NRR	Qualification
1	Nepal	2	1	0	1	3	4.250	Advanced to the final
2	Papua New Guinea	2	1	1	0	2	−0.720	Advanced to the final
3	Hong Kong	2	0	1	1	1	−3.739	

Source: ESPNcricinfo

=== Fixtures ===
10 March 2024
13:30
Scorecard

Hong Kong; 65/2 (8 overs)	v	Nepal
Anshuman Rath 36* (24); Gulsan Jha 1/18 (2 overs)

No result
Mission Road Ground, Mong Kok
Umpires: Shelton D'Cruz (HK) and John Prakash (HK)

- Nepal won the toss and elected to field.
- No further play was possible due to rain.

12 March 2024
09:00
Scorecard

Nepal; 198/6 (20 overs)	v	Papua New Guinea; 113 (16.1 overs)
Kushal Bhurtel 59 (39); Assad Vala 2/18 (3 overs)		Hiri Hiri 28 (19); Kushal Bhurtel 4/12 (4 overs)

Nepal won by 85 runs
Mission Road Ground, Mong Kok
Umpires: Shelton D'Cruz (HK) and John Prakash (HK)
Player of the match: Kushal Bhurtel (Nep)

- Papua New Guinea won the toss and elected to field.
- Kushal Bhurtel (Nep) scored his 1,000th run in T20Is.

12 March 2024
14:00
Scorecard

Hong Kong; 121 (18.3 overs)	v	Papua New Guinea; 124/0 (12.4 overs)
Zeeshan Ali 55* (29); Sese Bau 2/10 (2 overs)		Sese Bau 61* (43)

Papua New Guinea won by 10 wickets
Mission Road Ground, Mong Kok
Umpires: Shelton D'Cruz (HK) and John Prakash (HK)
Player of the match: Sese Bau (PNG)

- Hong Kong won the toss and elected to bat.

== 3rd place play-off ==
13 March 2024
09:00
Scorecard

Hong Kong; 235/4 (20 overs)	v	Hong Kong A 165/7 (20 overs)
Anshuman Rath 55 (26); Rajab Hussain 2/14 (2 overs)		Jason Lui 58 (40); Nasrulla Rana 3/34 (4 overs)

Hong Kong won by 70 runs
Mission Road Ground, Mong Kok
Umpires: John Prakash (HK) and Hemant Tukrul (HK)
Player of the match: Anshuman Rath (HK)

- Hong Kong won the toss and elected to bat.

== Final ==
13 March 2024
14:00
Scorecard

Papua New Guinea; 171/8 (20 overs)	v	Nepal; 85 (16.3 overs)
Tony Ura 61 (37); Kushal Bhurtel 3/24 (4 overs)		Sundeep Jora 17 (13); Sese Bau 2/10 (2 overs)

Papua New Guinea won by 86 runs
Mission Road Ground, Mong Kok
Umpires: Shelton D'Cruz (HK) and John Prakash (HK)
Player of the match: Tony Ura (PNG)

- Nepal won the toss and elected to field.
