= 2026 Nepal Tri-Nation Series =

The 2026 Nepal Tri-Nation Series can refer to:

- 2026 Nepal Tri-Nation Series (April), a cricket tri-series in April 2026 between Oman, Nepal and the United Arab Emirates
- 2026 Nepal Tri-Nation Series (May), a cricket tri-series in May 2026 between Nepal, Scotland and the United States
