= Bhawana Ghimire =

Former Nepalese Cricket Association executive

Bhawana Ghimire was the CEO of Cricket Association of Nepal from 2014 to 2016.

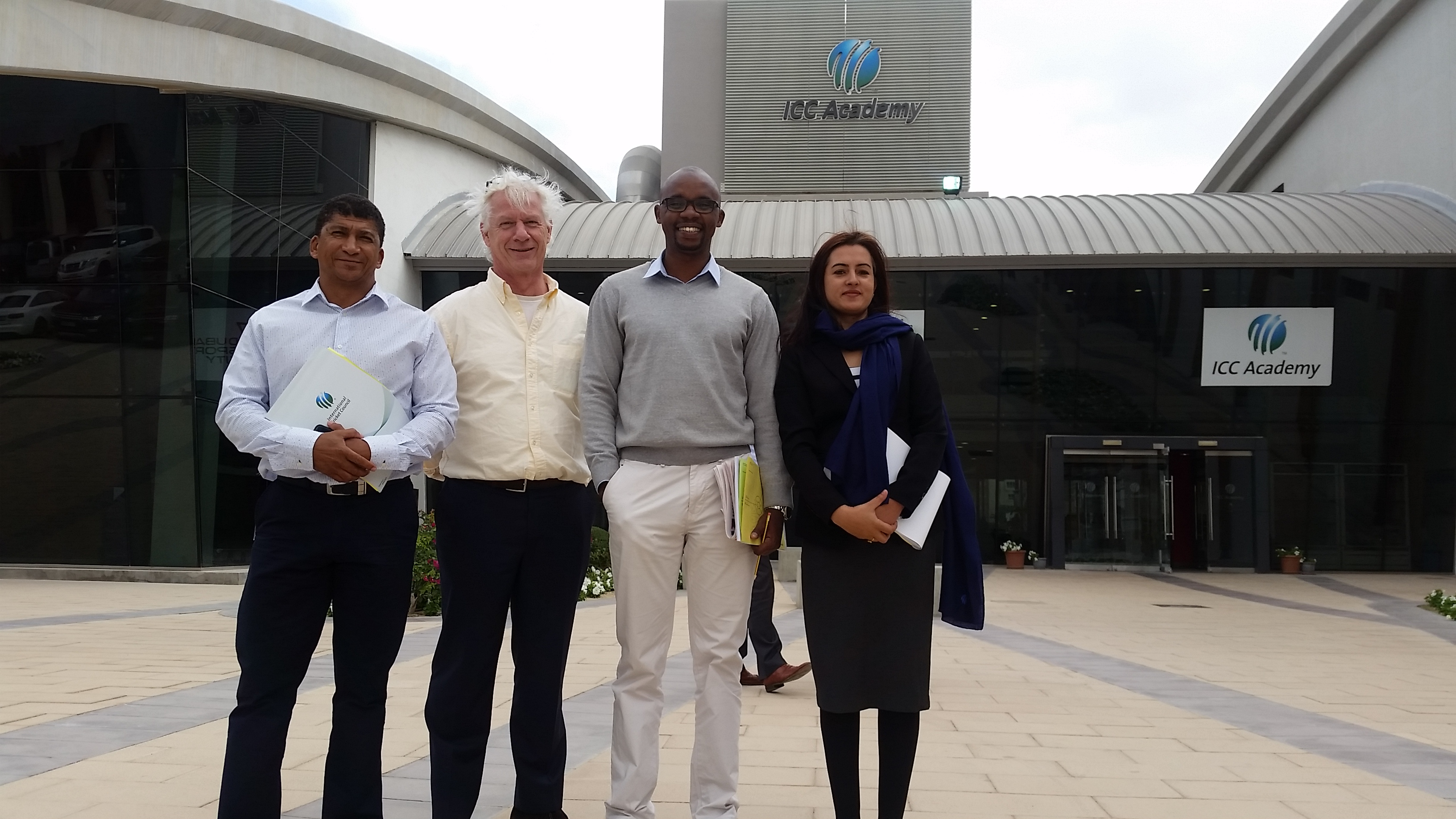
Bhawana in CEO leadership training-ICC, Dubai.

== Education and career ==
A native of Nepal, Bhawana went for her master's degree in Business Administration from the University of Wales in 2006. Ghimire worked with Punjab National Bank in London and then with a wealth management company in Bahrain where she was also involved in work relating to Formula One, the English Premier League and the Spanish La Liga.

In October 2014, she succeeded in getting an International cricket administration role as a first CEO of Cricket Association of Nepal.

Ghimire convinced 22 national cricketers to sign a central contract for the first time in the history of cricket in Nepal. She was also praised for her idea to render unique tribute to Late Australian Cricketer Phillip Hughes in Nepal by organizing 63 over tribute match and taking Phillip Hughes equipment to Mount Everest when Cricket Australia accepted her idea.

She proved her marketing skills after signing a record breaking sponsorship deal with Nepal Telecom worth 46.5 million Nepalese rupees (approx. $465,000) for three years.

Cricket in Nepal was reshuffled after the April 2015 Nepal earthquake killed more than 8,000 people and injured more than 50,000 with multi-billion loss of properties and infrastructures. Bhawana initiated "Bat for Nepal" project under CAN banner appealing global cricket communities to support Nepal and its rebuilding initiatives which also includes rebuilding destructed cricketing infrastructures and facilities.

She visited India many times to further a relationship with BCCI but things started changing only after a new regime took over BCCI's reins in March. India stepped in, with the Board of Control for Cricket in India inviting Nepal cricket team to train and prepare for the 2015 ICC World Twenty20 Qualifier in Dharamshala. She established a good rapport with BCCI and Nepal's cricket.

In a clear indication of its refusal to recognise the authenticity of Cricket Association of Nepal’s newly elected executive committee in December 2015, the National Sports Council told CAN CEO Ghimire to take full charge of the Nepali cricket's governing body for the time being.

Bhawana Ghimire is lined up among the most searched cricket personalities of Nepal. She resigned in June 2016 after the ICC AGM in Scotland, however she has been working for the development of Nepal's cricket under ICC Management directly as a local coordinator.

She jointly with Parash Shakya, registered a charitable organization called Bat & Ball Foundation in 2017. Bat & Ball Foundation invited high-profile coach Dav Whatmore to launch its foundation and support U19 players for 15 days high performance camp.
