= Jay Trophy =

Multi-day cricket tournament in Nepal

Jay Trophy Men's Elite Cup
- Jay Trophy Official logo
- Countries: Nepal
- Administrator: Cricket Association of Nepal
- Format: League stage: 2-day; Final: 3-day
- First edition: 2024–25
- Latest edition: 2025–26
- Next edition: 2026–27
- Tournament format: Round-Robin and Final
- Number of teams: 6
- Current champion: Nepal Police Club (2nd title)
- Most successful: Nepal Police Club (2 titles)
- Most runs: Kushal Bhurtel (540)
- Most wickets: Lalit Rajbanshi (50)
- Website: Official website

The Jay Trophy Men's Elite Cup, referred to as the Jay Trophy (Nepali: जय ट्रफि) is an annual domestic multi day cricket championship played in Nepal. The competition is organised by the Cricket Association of Nepal (CAN) and contested by the top six teams from the previous season of the Prime Minister Cup. It is named after Jay Kumar Nath Shah, the first president of Cricket Association of Nepal.

The competition is contested in a single round-robin format. The inaugural season was held in 2024–25 featuring the top four teams from the 2024 Prime Minister Cup. The Cricket Association of Nepal (CAN) announced that the tournament will expand to six teams starting from the 2026–27 season, which will mark the third edition of the competition.

Nepal Police Club is the most successful team winning all two seasons of the competition.

== History ==
The Cricket Association of Nepal (CAN) organized the Senior Two-Day National League in June 2007 with six regional teams. The inaugural tournament was cut short, with only seven of the fifteen matches played, and was cancelled from the following season.

CAN included a multi-day cricket championship, then called Men's Elite Trophy for April 2024 as part of their annual calendar in 2024. The tournament was moved to October and again to December. In December 2024, the tournament was renamed to Jay Trophy Men's Elite Cup and was announced for January 2025. The tournament was named after the first president of CAN, Jay Kumar Nath Shah.

The inaugural edition of the competition was played in Janakpur and Birgunj and included the top four teams from the 2024 Prime Minister Cup.

== Competition format ==
The tournament is played in a single round-robin format, with each team playing the other teams once. League matches are played over two-days while the final is played over three-days. Each day features 110 overs over three sessions and played over six hours and forty-five minutes. The first innings is capped at 70 overs in the league stage and 80 overs for the final.

In the first two seasons, the top four teams from the Prime Minister Cup qualified for the tournament. However, the Cricket Association of Nepal (CAN) announced that the competition will expand to include six teams starting from the 2026–27 season, which will mark the third edition of the tournament.

=== Points system ===
A points system has been used since the inaugural season, and currently points are awarded for each match according to the following table.

Result	Points
An outright win	6
Lead in first innings	4
Tie in first innings	2
Draw or No Result	1
An outright loss	0
Bonus batting points	0.5 for every 25 runs scored in the first innings of each team 0.5 for every 25 runs scored throughout the second innings of each team up to 4 points
Bonus bowling points	0.5 for taking each wicket

== Teams ==
The top six teams from the Prime Minister Cup qualify to play in the Jay Trophy.

Team	Champions	Runners-up	Appearances	First appearance	Most recent appearance
Nepal APF Club	0	0	1	2025–26	2025–26
Bagmati Province	0	0	2	2024–25	2025–26
Lumbini Province	TBD	TBD	TBD	Future	Future
Madhesh Province	0	0	1	2024–25	2024–25
Nepal Police Club	2	0	2	2024–25	2025–26
Sudurpashchim Province	TBD	TBD	TBD	Future	Future
Tribhuwan Army Club	0	2	2	2024–25	2025–26

== Competition placings ==
Season	Wiiner	Runner-Up	Third	Fourth
2024–25	Nepal Police Club	Tribhuwan Army Club	Bagmati Province	Madhesh Province
2025–26	Nepal Police Club	Tribhuwan Army Club	Nepal APF Club	Bagmati Province

== Individual awards ==
Individual awards are announced at the end of each competition.

Season	Player of the Tournament	Best Batsman	Best Bowler
2024–25	Shahab Alam (Army)	Mayan Yadav (Madhesh)	Shahab Alam (Army)
2025–26	Lalit Rajbanshi (Police)	Ishan Pandey (Bagmati)	Lalit Rajbanshi (Police)

== Tournament records ==
As of 19 March 2026

Team records
Most trophy wins	2	Police	
Highest team score	352/7d	Army v Bagmati	2025–26
Lowest team score	74	Army v Police	2024–25

Individual match records
Highest individual innings	106	Mayan Yadav	Madhesh v Bagmati	2024–25
Best innings bowling	8/59	Shahab Alam	Army v Police	2024–25
Best match bowling	12/112	Shahab Alam	Army v Police	2024–25

- Source: Records extracted from Cricinfo

== See also ==
- Prime Minister Cup Men's National Cricket Tournament
- National T20 Championship
- Prime Minister Cup Women's National Tournament
