= Adeeb Usmani =

Indian–Emirati cricketer (born 1997)

Personal information
- Born: 7 September 1997 (age 29); Thane, Maharashtra
- Batting: Right-handed
- Bowling: Right-arm off break
- Role: Wicket-keeper-batter

International information
- National side: United Arab Emirates (2026–present)
- ODI debut (cap 123): 25 April 2026 v Nepal
- Last ODI: 3 May 2026 v Oman
- ODI shirt no.: 41
- T20I debut (cap 97): 20 April 2026 v Nepal
- Last T20I: 21 April 2026 v Nepal
- T20I shirt no.: 41

Career statistics
Competition	ODI	T20I
Matches	5	2
Runs scored	267	32
Batting average	53.4	16.00
100s/50s	1/2	0/0
Top score	116	30
Catches/stumpings	6/0	0/1
- Source: ESPNcricinfo, 9 August 2026

Adeeb Usmani (born 7 September 1997) is an Indian-born Emirati cricketer who plays for the United Arab Emirates national cricket team as a right-handed wicket-keeper batter

== Early life ==
Usmani was born on 7 September 1997 in Thane in the Indian state of Maharashtra. He began playing cricket in his early teenage in Azamgarh, Uttar Pradesh.

He participated in age-group cricket competitions in an attempt to progress through India's age-group cricket system, alongside players like Shubman Gill, Abhishek Sharma, Rishabh Pant and Yashaswi Jaiswal, as well as his friend Sarfaraz Khan.

== Domestic career ==
Usmani was part of the Mumbai Under-23 team during the 2019 One-day tournament. He also represented SoBo Supersonics in the 2018 edition of the T20 Mumbai league.

In 2021, Usmani moved to Oman in search of greater opportunities after receiving an invitation from a player in the Oman national team. He subsequently joined Ruwi Rangers in the Oman D20 League and Bousher Busters in the D50 Championship. He was adjudged the player of the tournament in the 2024 D50 Championship, scoring 348 runs and taking five wickets in five matches.

During his time in Oman, Usmani caught the attention of Dubai-based commentator Mudassir Ali, who invited him to move to the United Arab Emirates. Usmani moved to the UAE in 2024 and began playing in domestic competitions.

== International career ==
After moving to the UAE in 2024, Usmani came to the attention of the national team selectors as a potential prospect. In April 2026, he became one of the five players who were granted the UAE citizenship via naturalisation.

In April 2026, he was named in UAE's T20I and ODI squads for the 17th round of the 2024–2026 CWC League 2 in Nepal. He made his Twenty20 International (T20I) debut against Nepal on 20 April 2026 and was given the wicket-keeping duties on his debut, ahead of the more experienced Aryansh Sharma.

He made his One Day International (ODI) debut against Nepal on 25 April 2026, scoring two fifties in the four matches that he played during the series, finishing as the fourth highest run-scorer with 151 runs. In his fifth ODI appearance for the UAE, Usmani scored his maiden international century against Scotland, finishing with 116 runs from 126 deliveries.
