= Sajan Lamichhane =

Nepalese cricket photographer and photojournalist

- साजन लामिछाने
- Born: August 23, 2001 (age 24); Kavresthali, Kathmandu, Nepal
- Citizenship: Nepal
- Occupations: Photojournalist, Photographer
- Years active: 2019–present
- Employer: Cricket Association of Nepal
- Known for: Sports photography, "The Umbrella and Flag" photo

Sajan Lamichhane (born 23 August 2001) is a Nepalese cricket photographer and photojournalist currently serving as the official photographer for the Cricket Association of Nepal (CAN). He is widely recognized for his ability to document the emotional and human elements of Nepalese cricket, moving beyond standard action shots to capture the passion of the fans.

== Early life and career ==
Sajan was born to Kedar Lamichhane and Bhawani Lamichhane in Kavresthali, Kathmandu. His interest in photography was sparked in the fourth grade by Polish visitors who brought cameras to his school, an event that inspired his ambition to become a professional photographer.

Driven by a childhood ambition to own a DSLR, Lamichhane spent several years saving money to overcome financial hurdles and purchase his first professional camera, a Nikon D750. This equipment became the foundation of his early career, during which he founded "Sajan's Photography" and began contributing as a photojournalist for various online portals.

He pursued a formal education in the field, earning a Diploma in Photography and Videography from Bimba Films and holds a Bachelor's degree in Information Management (BIM), which he balanced alongside his emerging career in sports media. Lamichhane began his professional journey at the age of 17, initially working with online portals such as Online Pana and Routine of Nepal Banda (RONB). Over time, he transitioned into sports journalism, focusing exclusively on the growing cricket culture in Nepal.

As the official photographer for the Cricket Association of Nepal, Lamichhane has covered major domestic and international events, including the ICC Cricket World Cup League 2, the Nepal T20 League, the Nepal Premier League and the PM Cup. His photography style, which he describes as "storytelling through the lens," focuses on capturing raw emotions of players and spectators that are often missed by traditional broadcast cameras. He emphasizes the importance of patience in sports photography, often waiting hours for a single definitive frame that represents the "spirit of the game.

== Notable works and awards ==
Lamichhane gained international attention for his viral photograph during the 2023 ACC Men's Premier Cup. The image, which features a solitary Nepalese flag rising from a sea of umbrellas during a rain delay, was shared by the International Cricket Council (ICC) and featured in various international sports outlets as a symbol of the resilience of Nepalese cricket fans.

In 2023, he was honored with a "Commitment Award" by Nepal’s former head coach, Monty Desai, for his dedication to documenting the national team's progress. His visual storytelling is credited with contributing to the Cricket Association of Nepal winning the ICC Global Award for Digital Fan Engagement for two consecutive years (2023 and 2024).
