= 2019 Prime Minister Cup =

- Dates: 24 May 2019 – 8 June 2019
- Administrator: National Sports Council (Nepal)
- Cricket format: One Day
- Tournament format: Round-robin tournament
- Host: Kathmandu
- Champions: Nepal Police Club
- Participants: 10
- Matches: 23
- Player of the series: Lalit Rajbanshi (NPC)
- Most runs: Raju Rijal (261 runs) (TAC)
- Most wickets: Lalit Rajbanshi (20 wickets) (NPC)

The 2019 Prime Minister Cup was the third edition of Prime Minister One Day Cup, which featured 10 teams. Nepal Police Club won all their matches, and were the first team to win a Prime Minister One Day Cup while undefeated.

== Group stage ==
=== Group A ===
Team	Pld	W	L	T	NR	NRR	Pts
Province No. 3	4	3	1	0	0	1.636	6
Armed Police Force Club	4	3	1	0	0	1.187	6
Province No. 5	4	2	1	0	1	–0.940	5
Sudur Paschim Province	4	1	2	0	1	–0.268	3
Gandaki Province	4	0	4	0	0	–1.673	0

=== Group B ===
Team	Pld	W	L	T	NR	NRR	Pts
Nepal Police Club	4	4	0	0	0	1.884	8
Tribhuwan Army Club	4	3	1	0	0	1.755	6
Province No. 2	4	2	2	0	0	–0.236	4
Province No. 1	4	1	3	0	0	–0.840	2
Karnali Province	4	0	4	0	0	–2.812	0

The top two teams from each group qualified for the playoffs.

== Playoffs ==
=== Semi-finals ===
5 June 2019
9:00 AM
Scorecard

Tribhuwan Army Club; 309/6 (50 overs)	v	Province No. 3; 192/9 (50.0 overs)
Binod Bhandari 75* (42); Nandan Yadav 2/41 (10 overs)		Ishan Pandey 79 (117); Shahab Alam 3/27 (10 overs)

Tribhuwan Army Club won by 117 runs (DLS method)
Tribhuvan University International Cricket Ground, Kirtipur
Umpires: Vinay Kumar and Kamalesh Thakur
Player of the match: Binod Bhandari (Tribhuwan Army Club)

- Province No. 3 won the toss and elected to field.

6 June 2019
9:00 AM
Scorecard

Armed Police Force Club; 41 (22.1 overs)	v	Nepal Police Club; 45/5 (9.3 overs)
Prithu Baskota 7 (19); Lalit Rajbanshi 4/8 (6 overs)		Pawan Sarraf 21* (14); Basant Regmi 3/20 (5 overs)

Nepal Police Club won by 5 wickets
Tribhuvan University International Cricket Ground, Kirtipur
Umpires: Himal Giri and Sanjay Gurung
Player of the match: Lalit Rajbanshi (Nepal Police Club)

- Tribhuwan Army Club won the toss and elected to field.

=== Final ===
8 June 2019
9:00 AM
Scorecard

Tribhuwan Army Club; 125 (33.3 overs)	v	Nepal Police Club; 126/6 (40.3 overs)
Sompal Kami 35 (40); Pawan Sarraf 4/12 (7 overs)		Amit Shrestha 44 (40); Karan KC 3/35 (9.3 overs)

Nepal Police Club won by 4 wickets
Tribhuvan University International Cricket Ground, Kirtipur
Umpires: Himal Giri and Sanjay Gurung
Player of the match: Lalit Rajbanshi (Nepal Police Club)

- Tribhuwan Army Club won the toss and elected to bat.
