= Irshad Ahamad =

Nepalese cricketer (born 1996)

Personal information
- Born: 10 September 1996 (age 30); Parsa, Nepal
- Source: ESPNcricinfo, 16 November 2015

Irshad Ahamad (born 10 September 1996) is a Nepalese cricketer. He made his List A debut in the 2015–17 ICC World Cricket League Championship on 16 November 2015 against Papua New Guinea.
