= Bagmati Province cricket team =

Nepali domestic cricket team

Bagmati Province

Personnel
- Captain: Sandeep Lamichhane (C)
- Coach: Kalam Ali
- Chairman: Paras Khadka
- Owner: Bagmati Province Cricket Association
- Adviser: Binayaraj Pandey

Team information
- Colours: Dark Blue
- Founded: 2020
- Home ground: Mulpani Cricket Ground
- Capacity: 5,000

History
- No. of titles: 0
- PM Cup wins: 0
- Jay Trophy wins: 0
- Official website: cricketnepal.org.np

The Bagmati Province Cricket team is a Nepali professional cricket team which represents Bagmati Province in Nepalese domestic cricket. The team competes in Prime Minister Cup and Jay Trophy. The team is currently being run under the Bagmati Province cricket Association.

== History ==
The team was formed and named as Team Bagmati in December 2020, ahead of the 2020 Gautam Buddha Cup, which was played by three teams from 12 to 15 December 2020. The team competed in the tournament under the leadership of Nepalese national captain Gyanendra Malla.

== Grounds ==
=== Mulpani International Cricket Ground ===
The Mulpani International Cricket Ground, Commonly known as Upper Mulpani Cricket Ground or simply Mulpani Ground is a cricket ground in Mulpani, Kathmandu, Nepal.

=== Gautam Buddha International Cricket Stadium ===
Gautam Buddha International Cricket Stadium, often abbreviated as GBICS, is a cricket stadium being built at Bharatpur, Nepal. As of July 2020, 15% of the overall work has been completed.

== Statistics and honours ==
- Prime Minister Cup Men's National Cricket Tournament
  - Semi finals (2): 2019, 2021

== Notable players ==
- Paras Khadka
- Gyanendra Malla
- Prithu Baskota
- Nandan Yadav(2021-2025)

== Current squad ==
As of 18 March 2026

Bold highlighted Players are named for 2026 Prime Minister Cup
Name	Nationality	Birth date	Batting style	Bowling style	NPL Team	Notes
Batsmen
Asshutosh Ghiraiya	Nepal	26	Right-handed	Right-arm legbreak	—N/a	—N/a
Rit Gautam	Nepal	25	Right-handed	—N/a	—N/a	—N/a
Shubh Kansakar	Nepal	26	Right-handed	—N/a	Janakpur Bolts	—N/a
Suman Sunar	Nepal	28	Right-handed	—N/a	—N/a	—N/a
Ringzin Lama	Nepal	20	Right-handed		—N/a	—N/a
Pawan Bahadur Thapa	Nepal		Right-handed	—N/a	—N/a	—N/a
Shivam Tiwari	Nepal	19	Right-handed	—N/a	—N/a	—N/a
All-rounders
Ishan Pandey	Nepal	28	Left-handed	Right-arm off break	Sudurpaschim Royals	Vice-captain
Sonu Devkota	Nepal	22	Right-handed	Left-arm Leg break	—N/a	—N/a
Pratish GC	Nepal	22	Right-handed	Left-arm medium	Biratnagar Kings	—N/a
Bipin Acharya	Nepal	25	Right-handed	Right-arm offbreak	Chitwan Rhinos	—N/a
Sachin Lekhak	Nepal	26	Right-handed	Right-arm offbreak	—N/a	—N/a
Subash Khatri	Nepal	26	Right-handed	Left-arm orthodox	—N/a	—N/a
Wicket-keepers
Bibek Rana Magar	Nepal	23	Left-handed	—N/a	—N/a	—N/a
Uttam Thapa Magar	Nepal	20	Right-handed	—N/a	Kathmandu Gorkhas	—N/a
Shaurav Shakhakarmi	Nepal	24	Right-handed	—N/a	—N/a	—N/a
Spin bowlers
Surya Tamang	Nepal	24	Left-handed	left-arm Slow orthodox	Biratnagar Kings	—N/a
Sandeep Lamichhane	Nepal	26	Right-handed	Right-arm legbreak	Biratnagar Kings	Captain
Tilak Bhandari	Nepal	21	Right-handed	Right-arm legbreak	Lumbini Lions	
Pace bowlers
Gautam KC	Nepal	22	Right-handed	Right-arm medium fast	Chitwan Rhinos	—N/a
Rijan Dhakal	Nepal	27	Right-handed	Left-arm medium	Chitwan Rhinos	—N/a
Dayanand Mandal	Nepal	19	Right-handed	Left-arm medium	—N/a	—N/a

== Support staff ==
As of 18 January 2024

Position	Name
Team manager	Bijit Dhwaj Chand
Head coach	Kalam Ali
