= Madhesh Province cricket team =

Nepali domestic cricket team

Madhesh Province
- Nickname: MP

Personnel
- Captain: Anil Kumar Sah
- Coach: Sunil Sah
- Chairman: Sunil Mahaseth
- Owner: Madhesh Province Cricket Association
- Manager: Dipendra Yadav

Team information
- Colours: Orange
- Established: 2020
- Home ground: Shree Ram Janaki International Stadium, Janakpur
- Capacity: 60,000+
- Secondary home ground(s): Narayani Cricket Ground, Birgunj
- Secondary ground capacity: 5,000

History
- No. of titles: 0
- PM Cup wins: 0
- Jay Trophy wins: 0
- Official website: madheshcricket.com

Madhesh Province Cricket team is a Nepali professional cricket team, based in the Madhesh Province, Nepal. The team competes in Prime Minister Cup and Jay Trophy. The team is currently being run under the Madhesh Province Cricket Association.

== History ==
The team was formed and named as Team Madhesh in December 2020. The team won the inaugural edition of KP Oli Cup, a domestic T20 cricket tournament back in the December 2023 under the captaincy of Harishankar Shah.

== Grounds ==
=== Shree Ram Janaki International Stadium ===
Shree Ram Janaki International Stadium is a multi-purpose sports stadium under development in Janakpur, Nepal. The stadium is being built on 17 bighas of land in Rajaul, Janakpur. It will have a capacity of over 60,000. The Govt. of India has announced the financial support of ₹100 Crores. The Madhesh Pradesh Government has announced to invest Rs. 2 Billion on this stadium.

=== Narayani Cricket Ground ===
The Narayani Cricket Ground, commonly known as Birgunj Cricket Ground, is a cricket ground in Birgunj, Madhesh Province, Nepal.

== Statistics and honours ==
- Prime Minister Cup Men's National Cricket Tournament
  - Semi finals (1): 2022
- National T20 Championship
  - Winners (1): 2023

== Current squad ==
As of 8 March 2024

Madhesh Province Cricket Team Squad for 2025 Men's Prime Minister Cup
Name	Nationality	Birth date	Batting style	Bowling style	NPL Team	Notes
Batsmen
Mayan Yadav	Nepal	20	Right-handed	Right-arm offbreak	Janakpur Bolts	—N/a
Harishankar Shah	Nepal	31	Left-handed	Left-arm offbreak	—N/a	—N/a
All-rounders
Pawan Sarraf	Nepal	25	Right-handed	Right-arm offbreak	Karnali Yaks	Vice-captain
Rupesh Singh	Nepal	26	Right-handed	Right-arm medium fast	Janakpur Bolts	—N/a
Nikhil Singh	Nepal	22	Right-handed	Right-arm offbreak	—N/a	—N/a
Wicket-keepers
Anil Sah	Nepal	28	Right-handed	—N/a	Janakpur Bolts	Captain
Rohan BK	Nepal	22	Right-handed	—N/a	—N/a	—N/a
Spin Bowlers
Ranjit Kumar	Nepal	20	Left-handed	Left-arm Slow orthodox	Chitwan Rhinos	—N/a
Pradip Paswan	Nepal	25	Right-handed	Left-arm Slow orthodox	—N/a	—N/a
Pace Bowlers
Bishal Patel	Nepal	23	Left-handed	Left-arm medium	Lumbini Lions	—N/a
Rajesh Yadav	Nepal	20	Right-handed	Right-arm medium fast	—N/a	—N/a
Dipesh Das	Nepal		Right-handed	Right-arm medium fast	—N/a	—N/a
Kamal Gupta	Nepal	32	Right-handed	Right-arm medium fast	—N/a	—N/a
Sailendra Shah	Nepal				—N/a	—N/a
Sunny Shah	Nepal		Right-handed	Right-arm medium fast	—N/a	—N/a

== Support staff ==
As of 13 March 2025
Position	Name
Head Coach	Sunil Sah
Assistant Coach	Shubha Tandukar
Team Manager	Dipendra Yadav
Technical Analyst	Navneet Jaiswal

As of 13 March 2025
