= Shahab Alam =

Nepalese cricketer

Personal information
- Born: 26 August 1999 (age 27); Bhairahawa, Nepal
- Batting: Right-handed
- Bowling: Slow left arm orthodox
- Role: Bowler

International information
- National side: Nepal (2021–present)
- T20I debut (cap 34): 17 April 2021 v Netherlands
- Last T20I: 29 August 2022 v Kenya
- T20I shirt no.: 5

Domestic team information
- Years: Team
- 2023-present: Tribhuwan Army Club
- 2024-present: Kathmandu Gorkhas

Career statistics
Competition	T20I
Matches	6
Runs scored	0
Batting average	–
100s/50s	0/0
Top score	0*
Balls bowled	108
Wickets	4
Bowling average	41.50
5 wickets in innings	0
10 wickets in match	0
Best bowling	1/15
Catches/stumpings	2/–
- Source: ESPNcricinfo,, 23 September 2025

Shahab Alam (Nepali: शाहब आलम) is a Nepalese cricketer. He is a right-handed batsman and a left-arm orthodox spinner. He made his debut for Nepal against the Netherlands in April 2021.

He represents the Tribhuwan Army Club in domestic cricket.

== Playing career ==
Alam represented Nepal national under-19 cricket team in the 2017 ICC Asia Under-19s World Cup Qualifier and picked up 12 wickets at an average of 10.08. He took three wickets for 15 runs in the final of the 2017 ACC Under-19 Eastern Region against Hong Kong as Nepal qualified for the 2017 ACC Under-19 Asia Cup. In an Under-19 Asia Cup match against India, he took two crucial wickets for 11 runs and helped his team win the match.

In 2018, he earned the bid of Rs. 150,000 and was sold to Biratnagar Titans of the Pokhara Premier League. He was the second-leading wicket-taker in the 2019 Prime Minister Cup, where he picked up 16 wickets in six matches at an average of 8.75.

Alam played for Team Narayani in the 2020 Gautam Buddha Cup and picked up four wickets at an average of 7.25. He also picked up 10 wickets from four matches at an average of 9.00 in the 2019–20 Manmohan Memorial National One-Day Cup.

He was the second-leading wicket-taker in the 2021 Prime Minister Cup, where he took 12 wickets in five matches at an average of 12.66. In a match against Province No. 1, he was awarded man of the match award for his four-wicket haul. He was selected in the 18-member national team for the closed camps for the T20I series against Qatar but the tour was eventually postponed due to the increasing COVID-19 cases in Qatar.

Alam was subsequently selected in the 15 members national squad for the 2020–21 Nepal Tri-Nation Series and made his T20I debut against Netherlands on 17 April 2021. He picked up 2 wickets from three matches in the series.
