= Aakash Chand =

Nepalese cricketer (born 2004)

Personal information
- Born: 18 December 2004 (age 21); Bhimdatta, Kanchanpur
- Batting: Right-handed
- Bowling: Right-arm medium
- Role: Bowler

International information
- National side: Nepal
- ODI debut (cap 40): 10 February 2024 v Canada
- Last ODI: 12 February 2024 v Canada
- ODI shirt no.: 11
- T20I debut (cap 46): 9 March 2024 v Hong Kong
- Last T20I: 13 March 2024 v Papua New Guinea
- T20I shirt no.: 11

Career statistics
Competition	ODI	T20I
Matches	2	3
Runs scored	–	2
Batting average	–	2.00
100s/50s	–	0/0
Top score	–	2
Balls bowled	78	60
Wickets	2	7
Bowling average	41.9	12.00
5 wickets in innings	0	0
10 wickets in match	0	0
Best bowling	1/31	3/27
Catches/stumpings	0/–	1/–
- Source: Cricinfo, 8 November 2024

Aakash Chand (born 18 December 2004) is a Nepalese cricketer who plays as a bowler for the Nepal national cricket team. Aakash Chand was born in Bheemdatt, Kanchanpur, Nepal. He is a right-handed batsman and a right-arm medium-pace bowler who primarily plays as a bowler for the Nepal national cricket team.

== Early life and youth career ==
Aakash Chand hails from Bheemdatt in the Kanchanpur District of Nepal. He began his cricketing journey at a young age, representing regional age-group teams before being selected for the Nepal Under-19 side. Chand participated in the 2024 Under-19 Cricket World Cup, where he delivered an impressive performance, taking a five-wicket haul against Afghanistan and earning the *Man of the Match* award.

== Domestic and club career ==
Chand has represented several domestic teams in Nepal, including Sudurpashchim Province, Nepal Army Club, and Tribhuvan Army Club. He has also featured for Nepal Red in local competitions, continuing to establish himself as one of the most promising young fast bowlers in the country. In 2025, he was signed by the Pokhara Avengers franchise to play in the Nepal Premier League.

== International career ==
On 4 February 2024, he was named in the squad for the series against Canada. He made his ODI debut for Nepal in 2nd ODI against Canada, on 10 February 2024. On 9 March 2024, he made his T20I debut against Hong Kong in a Friendship Cup.
