= Cricket Association of Nepal =

National governing body of cricket in Nepal

- नेपाल क्रिकेट सङ्घ
- Sport: Cricket
- Jurisdiction: Nepal
- Abbreviation: CAN
- Founded: 1946; 80 years ago (2003 BS)
- Affiliation: International Cricket Council
- Affiliation date: 1988 AD (2045 BS) Affiliate; 1996 AD (2053 BS) Associate
- Regional affiliation: Asian Cricket Council
- Affiliation date: 1990 AD (2047 BS)
- Headquarters: Mulpani Cricket Stadium
- Location: Kathmandu
- President: Chatur Bahadur Chand
- Vice president: Roshan Kumar Singh
- Secretary: Paras Khadka
- General Manager: Utsav Dhungana
- Men's coach: Stuart Law
- Women's coach: Harshal Pathak
- Sponsor: Naasa securities,Xtreme Energy Drink, T10 Sports (Kit sponsor)

Official website
- cricketnepal.org.np
- Other key staff: Sajan Lamichhane
- (Nepal)

Cricket Association of Nepal (CAN) is the official governing body of cricket in Nepal. Its headquarters are situated in Mulpani, Kathmandu. It is Nepal's representative at the International Cricket Council and has been an associate member since 1996 AD (2053 BS). It is also a member of the Asian Cricket Council (ACC).

The board was dissolved by the government of Nepal in November 2014 on the grounds of incompetence and a three-member ad hoc committee was established with a new president designated by the government itself.

In April 2016, CAN was suspended by the International Cricket Council (ICC), on the grounds of government interference in its operations. However the suspension did not prevent Nepal's national teams from participating in ICC tournaments.

The ICC welcomed the elections of the board held in September 2019. On 13 October 2019, the ICC lifted its suspension of the Cricket Association of Nepal, and formally reinstated the board on a conditional basis on 14 October.

== National teams ==
Men's white-ball team: Nepal played their first One-Day International in August 2018 and has since won multiple ICC tournaments, including three T20 World Cups. As of April 2025, Rohit Paudel leads the ODI & T20I team.

Women's team: Nepal qualified for their first Women's T20 global qualifier in 2025. They haven't won any women's tournaments yet, but they've been steadily rising in recent years. As of April 2025, the team is captained by Indu Barma.

Under-19s team: Men's U-19 and Women's U-19 teams regularly compete in the ICC Under-19 Cricket World Cups. The most recent captains (2025) are Naren Bhatta for the men's team and Puja Mahato for the women's team.

Reserves (A team): The Nepal A is the second-tier men's team, focusing on developing players and providing them with exposure through tours and warm-up matches. The team plays in various formats to prepare players for the senior team.

Disability teams: Cricket Australia is committed to creating inclusive environments for people with disabilities. The teams are not directly administered by the Cricket Association of Nepal, but they consistently receive its support and the teams include:

- Blind
- Deaf

These teams participate in various national and international competitions, promoting the growth of cricket among players with disabilities.

== Province Cricket Associations ==
Cricket Association of Nepal is an administrative organisation responsible for cricket in Nepal. CAN has 7 member provincial cricket associations. Each provincial cricket association affiliated with the Cricket Association of Nepal selects a representative team to participate in Nepal's major domestic cricket tournaments each season.

=== Province members ===
No.	Name	Represents	President
1	Koshi Province Cricket Association	Koshi	Sarwajit Pandey
2	Madhesh Province Cricket Association	Madhesh	Sunil Mahaseth
3	Bagmati Province Cricket Association	Bagmati	Paras Khadka
4	Gandaki Province Cricket Association	Gandaki	Sanjay Kant Sigdel
5	Lumbini Province Cricket Association	Lumbini	Binay Raj Bhandari (Acting President)
6	Karnali Province Cricket Association	Karnali	Padam Bahadur Khadka
7	Sudurpashchim Province Cricket Association	Sudurpashchim	Basudev Joshi

== Domestic teams ==
Provincial Teams
Province/Teams	Men's side	Women's side
Koshi	Koshi Province Men's Cricket Team	Koshi Province Women's Cricket Team
Madhesh	Madhesh Province Men's Cricket Team	Madhesh Province Women's Cricket Team
Bagmati	Bagmati Province Men's Cricket Team	Bagmati Province Women's Cricket Team
Gandaki	Gandaki Province Men's Cricket Team	Gandaki Province Women's Cricket Team
Lumbini	Lumbini Province Men's Cricket Team	Lumbini Province Women's Cricket Team
Karnali	Karnali Province Men's Cricket Team	Karnali Province Women's Cricket Team
Sudurpashchim	Sudurpashchim Province Men's Cricket Team	Sudurpashchim Province Women's Cricket Team
Departmental Teams
APF Club	APF Men's Cricket Team	APF Women's Cricket Team
Tribhuwan Army	Tribhuwan Men's Cricket Team	Tribhuwan Army Women's Cricket Team
Nepal Police	Nepal Police Men's Cricket Team	Nepal Police Women's Cricket Team

CAN maintains a strong yet independent relationship with the Cricket Players Association Nepal to ensure proper players' rights, welfare provisions, and pay agreements.

== Domestic Tournaments ==
=== Province Level ===
The CAN organise following Provincial-level tournaments:

==== Men's Senior ====
- Jay Trophy Men's Elite Cup
- Prime Minister Cup
- National T20 Championship

==== Men's Youth ====
- Men's Under-19 National Cricket Tournament
- TB Shah Memorial Cup Under-16 National Cricket Tournament
- Manmohan Memorial Under-16 National Cricket Tournament
- Under-14 National Cricket Championship

==== Women's Senior ====
- Prime Minister Cup Women's National Cricket Tournament
- Lalitpur Mayor Women's Cup

==== Women's Youth ====
- Maiyadevi Girls Under-19 Cup National Cricket Tournament
- Sushil Koirala Memorial Under-19 Girls Cricket Tournament
- Girl's Under-16 National Cricket Championship

=== Franchise Level ===
==== Men's Senior ====
- Nepal Premier League

==== Women's Senior ====
- Women Champions League

=== Current title holders ===
Tournament	Most recent	Champions	Runners-up	Next
Senior (men's)
Jay Trophy	2025–26 (qual.)	Nepal Police	Tribhuwan Army	2026–27
Prime Minister One Day Cup	2026	Tribhuwan Army	Sudurpashchim Province	2027
National T20 Championship	2024	Lumbini Province	Karnali Province	2025
Nepal Premier League (NPL)	2025	Lumbini Lions	Sudurpaschim Royals	2026
Senior (women's)
Women's Elite Cup	2025	TBD	TBD	TBD
Women's Prime Minister Cup	2024–25	APF Club	Sudurpashchim Province	2025
Lalitpur Mayor's Cup	2024 (qual.)	APF Club	Sudurpashchim Province	2025
Women Champions League	2019	Chitwan Rhinos Women	Kat Queens Kathmandu	TBD
Youth (men's)
Men's Under-19 National Cricket Tournament	2024	Sudurpashchim Province U19	Lumbini Province U19	2025
TB Shah Memorial Cup Under-16 National Cricket Tournament	2025	Madhesh Province U16	Bagmati Province U16	2026
Manmohan Memorial Under-16 National Cricket Tournament	2024	Madhesh Province U16	Sudurpashchim Province U16	2025
Under 14 National Cricket Championship	2025	Madhesh U14	Lumbini U14	TBD
Youth (women's)
Maiyadevi Girls Under-19 Cup National Cricket Tournament	2024	Bagmati Province U19	Gandaki Province U19	2025
Sushil Koirala Memorial Under-19 Girls Cricket Tournament	2024	Sudurpashchim Province U19	Kohalpur Mayor XI U-19	2025
Girl's Under-16 National Cricket Championship	2024	TBD	TBD	TBD

== Governance of CAN ==
=== Presidents ===
No.	Name	Tenure	Notes
1	Jay Kumar Nath Shah	1966 – September 2006	One of the longest serving cricket association president in the world. Association was almost non existent till the mid-1990s.
2	Binay Raj Pandey	September 2006 – December 2011	A long serving cricket administrator with business background. His committee was dissolved by the government for his failure to hold an election, a requirement of International Cricket Committee.
3	Tanka Angbuhaang	December 2011 – June 2014	Appointed by the Nepali government after Binaya Raj Pandey's dissolution, he brought in coach Pubudu Dassanayake and fostered ties with Indian cricket teams. Despite controversies, Nepal's cricket team reached their first T20 World Cup under his leadership.
Interim	Tarini Bikram Shah	June 2014 – November 2014	
Interim	Binay Raj Panday	November 2014 – April 2016	Appointed after the dissolution of Tanka Angabuhang's committee, his tenure saw repeated dissolutions and election failures, leading to CAN's suspension by the ICC.
6	Chatur Bahadur Chand	September 2019 – present	He was re-elected as president for second time on 23 September 2023.

Between 2016 and 2019, Bhawana Ghimire was CEO of the Cricket Association of Nepal. CAN was suspended during this period for government interventions.

== ICC Development Awards ==
The Cricket Association of Nepal (CAN) was recognised as the Asia Regional Winner for Digital Fan Engagement of the Year at the ICC Development Awards in 2023.

In 2024, CAN received the Global ICC Digital Fan Engagement of the Year Award, in recognition of its expanding digital presence across platforms such as Facebook, Instagram, YouTube, X (formerly Twitter), and others.

During the reporting period, CAN's digital campaigns reached approximately 117 million users across platforms. Facebook watch time exceeded 13.4 million minutes, reflecting increased audience engagement on the platform. YouTube performance also grew significantly, with watch hours rising by 277% to more than 2.13 million hours. In addition, CAN gained over 420,000 new followers across its digital platforms during this period.

== Controversies ==
Despite unprecedented success on the field, including victories over Hong Kong and Afghanistan at the 2014 ICC World Twenty20, Nepal went through some turmoil off the field in 2014 with a boycott of the national one-day tournament by the national players with the captain Paras Khadka slamming the Cricket Association of Nepal for their treatment of national players.

The board then came under an investigation by the Commission for Investigation into Abuse of Authority. Later, CIAA filed a case against 18 CAN members including the then President Tanka Aangabuhang, after finding them guilty of misusing around Rs. 14.31 million, which was to be used for developing the game in the country instead. This resulted in several CAN members stepping down from their posts on moral grounds.

In May, members of CAN filed a no-confidence motion against president Tanka Angbuhang, after the organization of the Nepal Premier League was outsourced to a private sports management firm.

In March, the CAN had said Nepal coach Pubudu Dassanayake would get a year's extension to his contract. However, he was only given a three-month extension, which ran out later June. The change in terms, CAN secretary Ashok Nath Pyakuryal said, was due to the board being under investigation. The coach left the country on 4 June due to unresolved contractual issues.

But the Government of Nepal intervened and handed Dassanayake a year's extension. Dassanayake returned to Nepal on 29 August after being invited by the government and was reappointed coach of Nepal's senior and Under-19 cricket teams.

After all these controversies in the year 2014, the Nepal Government dissolved the Angbuhang led CAN committee on 6 November and formed an ad hoc committee under former president Binaya Raj Pandey on an interim basis.

As a result of the governmental involvement in its running, the ICC suspended CAN in April 2016, though allowed the national teams to continue playing in international competitions.

== See also ==
- Nepal national cricket team
- Nepal women's national cricket team
- Cricket in Nepal
- List of Cricket administration in Nepal
