= Ishan Pandey =

Nepalese cricketer (born 1998)

Personal information
- Born: 2 March 1998 (age 28); Nepal
- Batting: Left-handed
- Role: All-rounder

International information
- National side: Nepal
- ODI debut (cap 44): 16 May 2026 v USA
- Last ODI: 21 July 2026 v Namibia
- T20I debut (cap 28): 27 September 2019 v Zimbabwe
- Last T20I: 10 October 2019 v Oman

Domestic team information
- Years: Team
- 2022 – Present: Bagmati Province
- 2024—present: Sudurpaschim Royals

Career statistics
Competition	T20I	ODI
Matches	4	4
Runs scored	33	167
Batting average	8.25	55.66
100s/50s	0/0	0/2
Top score	22	84
Catches/stumpings	1/–	1/–
- Source: Cricinfo, 23 July 2026

Ishan Pandey (born 2 March 1998) is a Nepalese cricketer who plays a left-handed batsman and bowls right-arm offspin. He has played for Nepal National Cricket Team and Nepal U19s. He is also medical doctor.

In September 2019, Pandey was named in Nepal's squad for the 2019–20 Singapore Tri-Nation Series and the 2019–20 Oman Pentangular Series. He made his T20I debut for Nepal, against Zimbabwe, in the Singapore Tri-Nation Series on 27 September 2019. Pandey was part of Nepal's squad for the 2019 ACC Emerging Teams Asia Cup in Bangladesh. He made his ODI debut for Nepal against the United States in the 2026 Nepal Tri-Nation Series on 16 May 2026.

He is also a medical doctor in addition to being a cricketer.
