= Kushal Bhurtel =

Nepalese cricketer

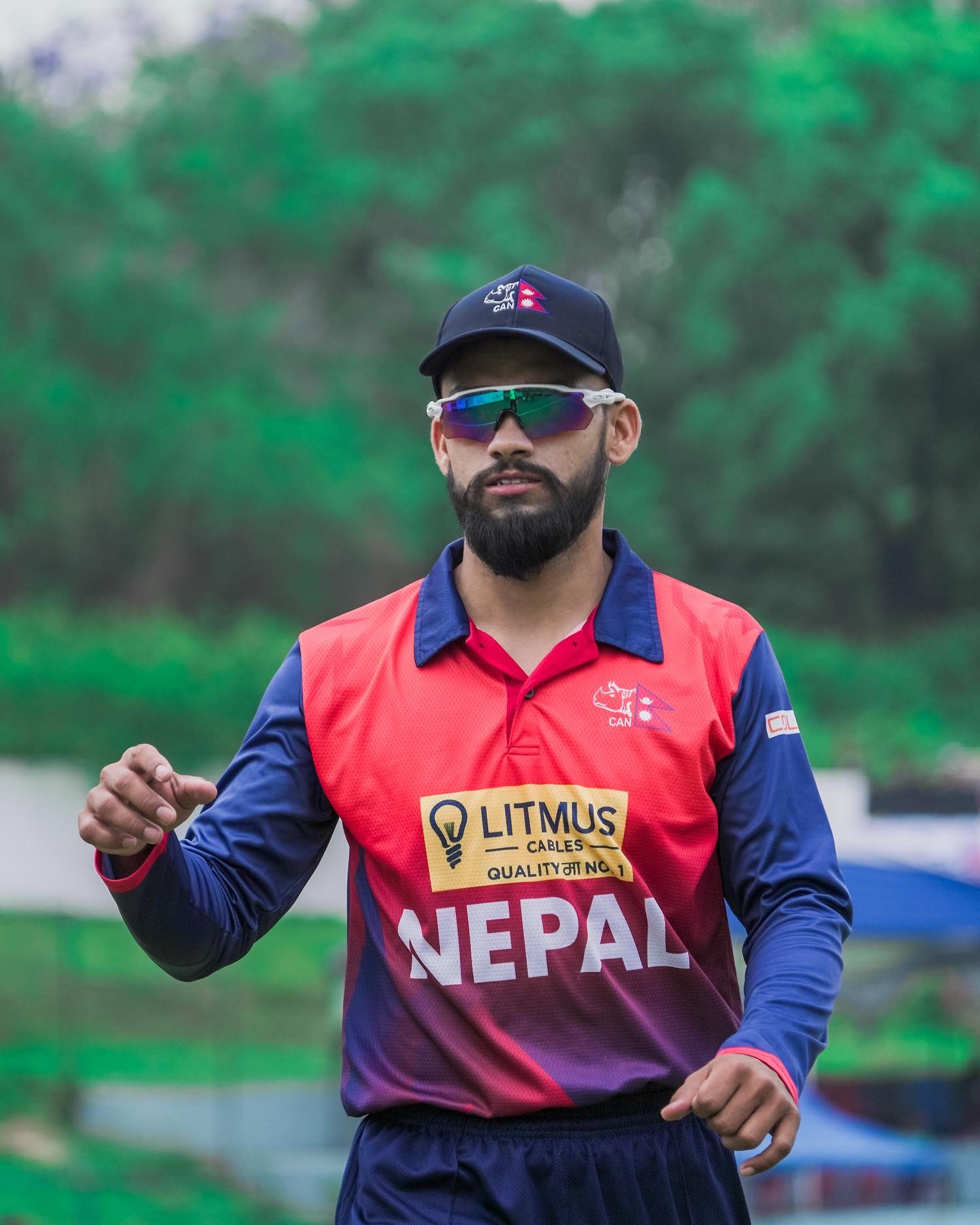
- Kushal Bhurtel in 2022 at Kirtipur

Personal information
- Born: 22 January 1997 (age 29); Butwal, Rupandehi, Nepal
- Batting: Right-handed
- Bowling: Right-arm leg break
- Role: Opening batter

International information
- National side: Nepal (2021–present)
- ODI debut (cap 25): 7 September 2021 v Papua New Guinea
- Last ODI: 22 May 2026 v United States
- ODI shirt no.: 14
- T20I debut (cap 33): 17 April 2021 v Netherlands
- Last T20I: 4 June 2026 v Malaysia
- T20I shirt no.: 14

Domestic team information
- Years: Team
- 2016: Panchakanya Tej
- 2017—present: Nepal Police Club
- 2018—2021: Lalitpur Patriots
- 2024—present: Pokhara Avengers
- 2026–present: Colombo Kaps

Career statistics
Competition	ODI	T20I	List A	T20
Matches	70	78	79	87
Runs scored	1,656	2,240	1,870	2,414
Batting average	24.71	32.46	24.93	31.76
100s/50s	2/9	3/14	2/11	3/14
Top score	120*	129	120*	129
Balls bowled	600	440	660	560
Wickets	17	31	23	38
Bowling average	30.35	16.38	24.17	16.55
5 wickets in innings	0	0	1	0
10 wickets in match	0	0	0	0
Best bowling	4/20	4/12	6/40	4/12
Catches/stumpings	45/–	40/–	49/–	42/–
Medal record
Representing Nepal
Men's Cricket
South Asian Games
Bronze medal – third place	2019 Kathmandu/Pokhara	Team
- Source: ESPNcricinfo, 5 June 2026

Kushal Bhurtel (Nepali: कुशल भुर्तेल, born 22 January 1997) is a Nepalese cricketer. He is an all-rounder who is a right-handed opening batsman and a leg-break bowler. He has played international cricket for Nepal since 2021 in both One Day Internationals and Twenty20 Internationals.

Bhurtel represented Nepal in the 2016 Under-19 Cricket World Cup, but then spent several years on the periphery of Nepal's senior team. He made his debut for Nepal in the 2020–21 Nepal Tri-Nation Series. During this series, he scored half-centuries in his first three matches, the first player in Twenty20 International history to do so. He was a member of Nepal's squad for both the 2024 and 2026 ICC Men's T20 World Cups.

In May 2026, he became the sixth player overall, and the second from Nepal, in T20Is to smash six consecutive sixes in a single over, achieving the feat against China during the Asian Games – Men's Qualifier.

== Early life and cricket career ==
As a child, Bhurtel wanted to become a goalkeeper in football, but he turned to cricket because of his father's wishes. He began playing cricket as an all-rounder, and represented Nepal in the 2016 Under-19 Cricket World Cup. As a batter, he was used as a power hitter in the lower order. He was unsuccessful as a fast bowler, not taking a single wicket during the tournament, and subsequently focused more on his batting.

The following year, Bhurtel played for Nepal's national team in a match against the United States, but the match was not awarded List A status. He ended up making his List A debut in the 2019 ACC Emerging Teams Asia Cup, playing for Nepal's Emerging Team against India's Emerging Team on 14 November. He was also part of Nepal's squad for the men's cricket tournament at the 2019 South Asian Games. The Nepalese team won the bronze medal, beating the Maldives by five wickets in the third-place playoff match.

== National team success ==
Bhurtel spent a long time on the periphery of national selection for Nepal. He attracted the attention of Nepal's coach Dav Whatmore when he began playing in domestic cricket as an opening batter. Whatmore selected him in Nepal's squad for the 2020–21 Nepal Tri-Nation Series against the Netherlands and Malaysia. When Nepal's established opening batter Paras Khadka pulled out of the series with an injury, Bhurtel was given his first opportunity. He made his Twenty20 International debut against the Netherlands on 17 April 2021, and top-scored for Nepal with 62 runs. Bhurtel scored three consecutive half-centuries in his first three matches, becoming the first player in Twenty20 International history to do so. He was named the player of the series, finishing with four half-centuries from his five matches and scoring a total of 278 runs at a batting average of 69.50. His performances in the series secured his place as an opening batter in the national team, and in May 2021, he was nominated for the ICC's Men's Player of the Month award.

In August 2021, Bhurtel was named in Nepal's One Day International squad for their series against Papua New Guinea in Oman, and their squad for round six of the 2019–2023 ICC Cricket World Cup League 2 tournament, also in Oman. He made his ODI debut on 7 September 2021, for Nepal against Papua New Guinea.

In February 2022, he was named in Nepal's T20I squad for the 2022 ICC Men's T20 World Cup Global Qualifier A tournament in Oman. In Nepal's second match of the tournament, against the Philippines, Bhurtel scored his first century in a T20I match.

In January 2026, Bhurtel was selected in Nepal's squad for 2026 T20I World Cup.

== Shift to spin bowling ==
After failures with fast bowling early in his career, Bhurtel had become an occasional leg break bowler in domestic cricket in Nepal. In 2022, Manoj Prabhakar (then the coach of Nepal's national team) was impressed enough with his bowling to have him bowl in an ODI series against the United Arab Emirates and again in a tri-series in Namibia, but after poor team performances Prabhakar was dismissed as coach and Bhurtel was dropped from the team.

Bhurtel returned to the national team under new coach Monty Desai as both an opening batter and a spin bowler, and in these roles he was part of Nepal's squad for the 2024 Men's T20 World Cup. During the World Cup he performed well, and in the following months he took as many wickets for Nepal as their established leg spinner Sandeep Lamichhane, making him as useful replacement for when Lamichhane was injured.
