= 2014 Nepal Premier League =

Cricket tournament Nepal

- Dates: 14 May 2014 – 24 May 2014
- Cricket format: One-day
- Tournament format(s): Round-robin and Knockout
- Host: Nepal
- Champions: Panchakanya Tej (1st title)
- Participants: 6
- Matches: 18
- Player of the series: Bhuwan Karki (Panchakanya Tej)
- Most runs: Pradeep Airee (212) (Kantipur Gurkhas)
- Most wickets: Bhuwan Karki (14) (Panchakanya Tej)

The 2014 Nepal Premier League was the first season of the Nepal Premier League. The event was organised by the Cricket Association of Nepal and managed by Zohra Sports Management. It was organised between May and June 2014 and consisted of a One Day tournament played in round-robin format followed by semi-finals and finals between the top four teams. Initially, the 2014 NPL was also supposed to include Twenty20 & Two Day tournaments but were later called off. Two-day tournament was called off by the organising committee due to bad weather conditions in the allocated venues amongst other reasons. Due to tight international schedule, ZSM was unable to complete the Twenty20 event, while telecommunication giants Ncell had also pulled out their sponsorship from the tournament. The Twenty20 & Two Day tournaments are expected to be included from the 2015 season onwards.

The One Day tournament of the 2014 season ran between 14 and 24 May. The venues for One Day tournament were Kailali and Kanchanpur.

Panchakanya Tej were the winners of the One Day tournament after defeating Jagdamba Giants in the final held at Fapla Cricket Ground, Dhangadi, Kailali.

== Launch ==
The League was unveiled on 24 February in a press conference held in Hotel Radisson, Kathmandu. Zohra Sports Management and Cricket Association of Npal have done an exclusive agreement to run the league for an initial three years.

== Teams and standings ==
=== One Day tournament ===
Team	Pld	W	L	T	NR	Pts	NRR
Panchakanya Tej	5	3	2	0	0	6	+1.078
Sagarmatha Legends	5	3	2	0	0	6	+0.210
Jagdamba Giants	5	3	2	0	0	6	+0.017
Kantipur Gurkhas	5	2	3	0	0	4	+0.348
Colors X-Factors	5	2	3	0	0	4	-0.768
Vishal Warriors	5	2	3	0	0	4	-0.804

== Squads ==
Vishal Warriors	Colors X-Factors	Jagdamba Giants	Panchakanya Tej	Kantipur Gurkhas	Sagarmatha Legends
Paras Khadka (c); Sagar Pun; Manjeet Shrestha; Yagyaman Kumal; Ramnaresh Giri; Deepesh Khatri; Bhivatsu Thapa; Aadil Khan; Nurdhos Singh; Irshad Ahamad; Sushan Bhari; Raju Rijal	Gyanendra Malla (c); Sanjam Regmi; Avinash Karn; Siddhant Lohani; Rajesh Pulami; Subash Pradhan; Jata Shankar Sarraf; Faizlur Khan; Kumar Thapa; Amar Rautela; Rahul Pratap Singh; Harishankar Shah; Bijay Ghatam	Shakti Gauchan (c); Mahesh Chhetri; Naresh Budhayer; Sompal Kami; Nizamudeen Ansari; Haseem Ansari; Devendra Sumare; Subendu Pandey; Amit Dahal; Ajay Rajbanshi; Pawan Shrestha; Amit Shrestha	Sharad Vesawkar (c); Sunny Pun; Prithu Baskota; Raj Pradhan; Aarif Sheikh; Bhuwan Karki; Karan KC; Nazir Ansari; Dipendra Airee; Binod Das; Puspa Thapa; Nirmal Thapa; Somesh Yadav	Basanta Regmi (c); Subash Khakurel; Pradeep Airee; Amrit Bhattarai; Suman: Gopal Singh; Santosh Baral; Antim Thapa; Surendra Chand; Santosh Bhatta; Prajwol Shahi; Amrit Kumar Shrestha; Lalit Dhami; Aakash Bista; Suman Shrestha: Binod Bhandari (c); Anil Mandal; Chandra Sawad; Lokendra Chand; Rupesh Shrivastav; Nischal Pandey; Paresh Lohani; Anupam Singh; Mehboob Alam; Nabin; Dilip Nath; Rupesh Bastola; Sunil Dhamala	

== Sponsors ==
[NTC] Nepal are the main sponsors of the NPL 2014 along with Zohra Sports Management.

== Rules and regulations ==
- Each team will consist of 16 players
- Maximum of 2 overseas players
- Each team must contain domestic associate player (i.e., Under-19 cricketers, regional cricketers)

== Prize money ==
=== One Day tournament ===
- Champions: रु 2 lakhs
- Runners-up: रु 1 lakh

== Fixtures and results ==
The inaugural match of the One Day tournament was played on 14 May 2014 at the Fapla Cricket Ground, Dhangadi, Kailali between Vishal Warriors and Sagarmatha Legends.

=== League stage (One Day) ===
14 May 2014
09:30 NST
Scorecard

Vishal Warriors; 135 all out (33.3 overs)	v	Sagarmatha Legends; 242 all out (49.3 overs)
Raju Rijal 37 (56); Ramnaresh Giri 3-49 (10 overs)		Binod Bhandari 98 (71); Nischal Pandey 3-37 (9 overs)

Sagarmatha Legends won by 107 runs
Fapla Cricket Ground, Dhangadi, Kailali
Umpires: Kishan Mahat & Arjun Khadka
Player of the match: Binod Bhandari (Sagarmatha Legends)

- Vishal Warriors won the toss and decided to bowl

15 May 2014
09:30 NST
Scorecard

Jagdamba Giants; 213/9 (50 overs)	v	Sagarmatha Legends; 162 all out (42.3 overs)
Naresh Budhayer 37 (72); Shakti Gauchan 4-19 (8.3 overs)		Anil Mandal 36 (54); Rahul Vishwakarma 3-48 (10 overs)

Jagdamba Giants won by 51 runs
Fapla Cricket Ground, Dhangadi, Kailali
Player of the match: Shakti Gauchan (Jagdamba Giants)

- Jagdamba Giants won the toss and decided to bat

15 May 2014
09:30 NST
Scorecard

Colors X-Factors; 180/9 (50 overs)	v	Vishal Warriors; 181/5 (48.1 overs)
Gyanendra Malla 77 (128); Ramnaresh Giri 4-42 (10 overs)		Dipesh Khatri 50 (65); Kumar Thapa 2-31 (9 overs)

Vishal Warriors won by 5 wickets
District Sports Development Committee Ground, Mahendranagar, Kanchanpur
Player of the match: Ramnaresh Giri (Vishal Warriors)

- Vishal Warriors won the toss and decided to bowl

16 May 2014
09:30 NST
Scorecard

Kantipur Gurkhas; 287/9 (50 overs)	v	Colors X-Factors; 104 all out (25 overs)
Pradeep Airee 67 (62); Amar Singh Routela 3-55 (10 overs)		Fazlur Rehman Khan 38 (30); Lalit Singh Bhandari 3-12 (5 overs)

Kantipur Gurkhas won by 183 runs
Fapla Cricket Ground, Dhangadi, Kailali
Player of the match: Pradeep Airee (Kantipur Gurkhas)

- Kantipur Gurkhas won the toss and decided to bat

16 May 2014
09:30 NST
Scorecard

Panchakanya Tej; 205/5 (40 overs)	v	Jagdamba Giants; 179 all out (38.1 overs)
Sharad Vesawkar 57*(48); Shuvankar Sanyasi 2-38 (8 overs)		Prem Tamang 28 (22); Bhuwan Karki 3-29 (8 overs)

Panchakanya Tej won by 26 runs
District Sports Development Committee Ground, Mahendranagar, Kanchanpur
Player of the match: Sharad Vesawkar Panchakanya Tej

- Panchakanya Tej won the toss and decided to bat

17 May 2014
09:30 NST
Scorecard

Panchakanya Tej; 208 all out (50 overs)	v	Vishal Warriors; 75 all out (22.4 overs)
Puspa Thapa 35 (62); Sushan Bhari 2-14 (10 overs)		Manjeet Shrestha 12 (9); Dipendra Airee 4-34 (9.4 overs)

Panchakanya Tej won by 133 runs
Fapla Cricket Ground, Dhangadi, Kailali
Player of the match: Dipendra Airee (Panchakanya Tej)

- Panchakanya Tej won the toss and decided to bat

17 May 2014
09:30 NST
Scorecard

Kantipur Gurkhas; 179 all out (38.5 overs)	v	Sagarmatha Legends; 183/5 (33.4 overs)
Surendra Chand 57 (80); Chandra Sawad 3-44 (8 overs)		Binod Bhandari 35 (34); Aakash Bista 3-42 (8 overs)

Sagarmatha Legends won by 5 wickets
District Sports Development Committee Ground, Mahendranagar, Kanchanpur
Player of the match: Mehboob Alam (Sagarmatha Legends)

- Kantipur Gurkhas won the toss and decided to bat first

18 May 2014
09:30 NST
Scorecard

Vishal Warriors; 138/9 (50 overs)	v	Jagdamba Giants; 139/4 (34.3 overs)
Suraj Kurmi 38 (114); Shakti Gauchan 3-15 (10 overs)		Hasim Ansari 50 (54); Paras Khadka 3-38 (9 overs)

Sagarmatha Legends won by 5 wickets
District Sports Development Committee Ground, Mahendranagar, Kanchanpur
Player of the match: Sompal Kami (Jagdamba Giants)

- Vishal Warriors won the toss and decided to bat
- Among the 10 overs bowled by Shakti Gauchan 6 were maiden

18 May 2014
09:30 NST
Scorecard

Sagarmatha Legends; 105 all out (38.3 overs)	v	Colors X-Factors; 109/6 (27.3 overs)
Rahul Vishwakarma 22 (49); Sanjam Regmi 3-23 (9.3 overs)		Gyanendra Malla 36 (34); Nischal Pandey 4-30 (10 overs)

Sagarmatha Legends won by 4 wickets
Fapla Cricket Ground, Dhangadi, Kailali
Player of the match: Hari Shankar Shah (Colors X-Factors)

- Sagarmatha Legends won the toss and decided to bat

19 May 2014
09:30 NST
Scorecard

Panchakanya Tej; 276/9 (50 overs)	v	Colors X-Factors; 120 all out (34.3 overs)
Puspa Thapa 91 (94); Faijlur Rahman Khan 3-21 (4 overs)		Rajesh Pulami 39 (65); Bhuwan Karki 6/40 (9 overs)

Panchakanya Tej won by 156 runs
District Sports Development Committee Ground, Mahendranagar, Kanchanpur
Player of the match: Bhuwan Karki (Panchakanya Tej)

- Colors X-Factors won the toss and decided to bowl
- Bhuwan Karki is the first bowler to take 6 wickets in a match in this tournament

19 May 2014
09:30 NST
Scorecard

Jagdamba Giants; 201 all out (49 overs)	v	Kantipur Gurkhas; 188 all out (49 overs)
Amit Shrestha 60 (100); Basanta Regmi 4-40 (10 overs)		Pradeep Airee 78 (94); Nizamuddin Ansari 5-33 (10 overs)

Jagdamba Giants won by 13 runs
Fapla Cricket Ground, Dhangadi, Kailali
Player of the match: Nizamuddin Ansari (Jagdamba Giants)

- Jagdamba Giants won the toss and decided to bat

20 May 2014
09:30 NST
Scorecard

Vishal Warriors; 99/2 (19.5 overs)	v	Kantipur Gurkhas; 95 all out (29.3 overs)
Raju Rijal 36 (64); Aakash Gupta 1-7 (3 overs)		Aakash Bista 24* (25); Sushan Bhari 6-35 (8.3 overs)

Vishal Warriors won by 8 wickets
District Sports Development Committee Ground, Mahendranagar, Kanchanpur
Player of the match: Sushan Bhari (Vishal Warriors)

- Vishal Warriors won the toss and decided to bowl
- Sushan Bhari is the first bowler to take a hat-trick in this tournament

20 May 2014
09:30 NST
Scorecard

Panchakanya Tej; 84 all out (27.1 overs)	v	Sagarmatha Legends; 85/8 (27.3 overs)
Sunny Pun 18 (19); Rahul Vishwakarma 3-6 (4 overs)		Rahul Vishwakarma16 (23); Sharad Vesawkar 3-18 (8 overs)

Sagarmatha Legends won by 2 wickets
Fapla Cricket Ground, Dhanadi, Kailali
Player of the match: Chandra Sawad (Sagarmatha Legends)

- Panchakanya Tej won the toss and decided to bat

21 May 2014
09:30 NST
Scorecard

Jagdamba Giants; 136 all out (43.2 overs)	v	Colors X-Factors; 139/9 (26.2 overs)
Hasim Ansari 37 (56); Sanjam Regmi 3-17 (6.2 overs)		Fazlur Rehman Khan 56 (27); Sompal Kami 4-37 (9 overs)

Colors X-Factors won by 1 wicket
Fapla Cricket Ground, Dhangadi, Kailali
Player of the match: Fazlur Rehman Khan (Colors X-Factors)

21 May 2014
09:30 NST
Scorecard

Panchakanya Tej; 127 all out (38.2 overs)	v	Kantipur Gurkhas; 131/5 (28.2 overs)
Indrakamal Manandhar 37 (88); Aakash Gupta 4-21 (5 overs)		Pradeep Airee 45 (40); Sharad Vesawkar 1-16 (6 overs)

Kantipur Gurkhas won by 5 wickets
District Sports Development Committee Ground, Mahendranagar, Kanchanpur
Player of the match: Aakash Gupta (Kantipur Gurkhas)

- Panchakanya Tej won the toss and decided to bat

=== Knockout stage (One Day) ===
Semifinals
2	Sagarmatha Legends	136/9 (42.5 overs) (D/L)
3	Jagdamba Giants	193/8 (50 overs)
1	Panchakanya Tej	119/5 (29.5 overs)
4	Kantipur Gurkhas	116 all out (40.3 overs)

Final
Jagdamba Giants	103 all out (31.4 overs)
Panchakanya Tej	200 all out (50 overs)

=== Semifinal (One Day) ===
22 May 2014
09:30 NST
Scorecard

Jagdamba Giants; 193/8 (50 overs)	v	Sagarmatha Legends; 136/9 (42.5 overs)
Bhupendra Thapa 57 (105); Rahul Vishwakarma 2-29 (10 overs)		Rupesh Srivastav 47 (56); Nijamuddin Ansari 4-20 (10 overs)

Jagdamba Giants won by 47 runs (D/L method)
District Sports Development Committee Ground, Mahendranagar, Kanchanpur
Player of the match: Nijamuddin Ansari (Jagdamba Giants)

- Sagarmatha Legends won the toss and decided to bowl
- Match stopped due to bad light condition at 42.5 overs. Target for Sagarmatha Legends at 42.5 overs was 184.

23 May 2014
09:30 NST
Scorecard

Panchakanya Tej; 119/5 (29.5 overs)	v	Kantipur Gurkhas; 116 all out (40.3 overs)
Sunny Pun 37 (82); Basanta Regmi 3-15 (9 overs)		Basanta Regmi 23 (58); Raj Pradhan 3-26 (9 overs)

Panchakanya Tej won by 5 wickets
Fapla Cricket Ground, Dhangadi, Kailali
Player of the match: Bhuwan Karki (Panchakanya Tej)

- Kantipur Gurkhas won the toss and decided to bat

=== Final (One Day) ===
24 May 2014
09:30 NST
Scorecard

Jagdamba Giants; 103 all out (31.4 overs)	v	Panchakanya Tej; 200 all out (50 overs)
Naresh Budhayer 29 (34); Raj Pradhan 6-42 (7.4 overs)		Sanjay Shrestha 74 (77); Shuvankar Sanyasi 3-31 (10 overs)

Panchakanya Tej won by 97 runs
Fapla Cricket Ground, Dhangadi, Kailali
Player of the match: Raj Pradhan (Panchakanya Tej)

- Jagdamba Giants won the toss and decided to bowl
- Bhuwan Karki of Panchakanya Tej was adjudged the man of the series

== See also ==
- Nepal Premier League
- Cricket in Nepal
- Nepal national cricket team
- Cricket Association of Nepal
