= 2016 Everest Premier League =

- Dates: 24 September 2016 – 3 October 2016
- Administrator: Cricket Association of Nepal
- Cricket format: Twenty20
- Tournament format(s): Round-robin and Final
- Champions: Panchakanya Tej (1st title)
- Participants: 6
- Matches: 16
- Player of the series: Sompal Kami (Jagadamba Rhinos)
- Most runs: Aasif Sheikh (220, Panchakanya Tej)
- Most wickets: Sushil Kandel (12, Panchakanya Tej)

The 2016 Everest Premier League was the debut season of the Everest Premier League. It was supposed to be the second edition of the Nepal Premier League, abbreviated as NPL, and was scheduled to be held from 26 March to 4 April 2015 in Kirtipur. but Cricket Association of Nepal insisted that it will not support the tournament unless its name is changed. Later, the board decided to uphold the tournament as the name was changed to Everest Premier League and provided the ground for competition. The tournament began on 24 September and ended on 3 October 2016.

The title was won by Panchakanya Tej, who defeated Colors X-Factors by 40 runs in the final. Sompal Kami of Jagadamba Rhinos was player of the tournament.

== Teams ==
Six franchise teams were formed under the names of corporate houses. The list of the teams and their players are listed below:

Colors X-Factors	Jagadamba Rhinos	Kantipur Gurkhas	Panchakanya Tej	Sagarmatha Legends	Vishal Warriors
Gyanendra Malla (C); Avinash Karn; Siddhant Lohani; Rajesh Pulami; Sanjam Regmi; Fazrul Rahman; Amar Singh Routela; Harishankar Shah; Rahul Pratap Singh; Himanshu Datt; Nandan Yadav; Yogeshwor Singh Karki; Arun Airee; Sanjay Basnet	Shakti Gauchan (C); Mahesh Chhetri; Sompal Kami; Nizamudeen Ansari; Haseem Ansari; Subendu Pandey; Prem Tamang; Amit Shrestha; Bhupendra Thapa; Shahab Alam; Saurabh Khanal; Bishal Gaudel; Pawan Sarraf; Bishal Sunar	Basanta Regmi (C); Subash Khakurel; Pradeep Airee; Antim Thapa; Santosh Bhatta; Akash Bista; Prajwal Shahi; Aakash Gupta; Lalit Rajbanshi; Abinash Bohara; Anil Sah; Krishna Karki; Sandeep Jora	Sharad Vesawkar (C); Sunny Pun; Sushil Kandel; Bhuwan Karki; Karan KC; Aarif Sheikh; Sanjay Shrestha; Sonu Tamang; Puspa Thapa; Dipendra Singh Airee; Prithu Baskota; Aasif Sheikh; Kushal Bhurtel; Nirmal Thapa	Binod Bhandari (C); Dilip Nath; Mahboob Alam; Anil Mandal; Sunil Dhamala; Rahul Vishwakarma; Bikram Sob; Sandeep Sunar; Chandra Sawad; Shankar Rana; Lal Bahadur Adhikari; Rupesh Shrivastav; Nischal Pandey; Anupam Singh	Paras Khadka (C); Raju Rijal; Sagar Pun; Paresh Lohani; Manjeet Shrestha; Deepesh Khatri; Prakash KC; Sushan Bhari; Ramnaresh Giri; Irshad Ahmed; Yagyaman Kumal; Suraj Prasad Kurmi; Dipesh Shrestha; Nurdhoj Sen

== Teams and standings ==
=== Points table ===
Team	Pld	W	L	NR	Pts	NRR
Panchakanya Tej	5	5	0	0	10	+1.333
Colors X-Factors	5	3	1	1	7	-0.125
Vishal Warriors	5	2	1	2	6	+0.796
Jagadamba Rhinos	5	2	3	0	4	-0.050
Kantipur Gurkhas	5	1	3	1	3	-0.369
Sagarmatha Legends	5	0	5	0	0	-1.452

advanced to the Final

=== League progression ===
	Group matches					
Team	1	2	3	4	5	Final
Panchakanya Tej	2	4	6	8	10	
Colors X-Factors	0	2	4	6	7	
Vishal Warriors	1	3	5	5	6	
Jagadamba Rhinos	0	2	2	2	4	
Kantipur Gurkhas	1	3	3	3	3	
Sagarmatha Legends	0	0	0	0	0	

Win	Loss	Super-Over	No result

Note: The total points at the end of each group match are listed.
Note: Click on the points (group matches) or W/L (knockout) to see the match summary.

== Fixtures ==
All times are Nepal Standard Time (UTC+05:45)

=== League stage ===
Match 1
24 September
12:30 A.M

Kantipur Gurkhas	v	Vishal Warriors

Match abandoned without a ball being bowled
TU Cricket Ground, Kirtipur

- No toss.
- Match abandoned due to rain.

Match 2
25 September
09:30 A.M

Jagdamba Rhinos; 129/4 (20 overs)	v	Panchakanya Tej; 133/4 (19 overs)
Sompal Kami 43*(20); Sushil Kandel 3-12 (3 overs)		Prithu Baskota 48(46); Sompal Kami 2-30 (4 overs)

Panchakanya Tej won by 6 wickets
TU Cricket Ground, Kirtipur
Player of the match: Sushil Kandel (Panchakanya Tej)

- Panchakanya Tej won the toss and elected to field.

Match 3
25 September
01:15 P.M

Sagarmatha Legends; 124/9 (20 overs)	v	Kantipur Gurkhas; 125/7 (15 overs)
Mehaboob Alam 23 (19); Basanta Regmi 3-13 (3 overs)		Pradeep Airee 55 (39); Rahul Vishwakarma 3-30 (4 overs)

Kantipur Gurkhas won by 7 wickets
TU Cricket Ground, Kirtipur
Player of the match: Pradeep Airee (Kantipur Gurkhas)

- Kantipur Gurkhas won the toss and elected to field.
- Pradeep Airee became the first player to score half-century in Everest Premier League Twenty20 history.

Match 4
26 September
9:30 A.M

Panchakanya Tej; 154/3 (20 overs)	v	Colors X-Factors; 120/8 (20 overs)
Aasif Seikh 67(60); Sanjam Regmi 1-17 (4 overs)		Himanshu Dutta 28*(25); Sharad Vesawkar 3-22 (4 overs); Karan KC 3-22 (4 overs)

Panchakanya Tej won by 34 runs.
TU Cricket Ground, Kirtipur
Player of the match: Sharad Vesawkar (Panchakanya Tej)

- Colors X-Factors won the toss and elected to field.

Match 5
26 September
1:15 PM

Vishal Warriors; 174/4 (20 overs)	v	Sagarmatha Legends; 149/5 (20 overs)
Paras Khadka 99(45); RK Shrivastavav 2-40 (4 overs)		S Dhamala 87(60); S Bhari 2-20 (3 overs)

Vishal Warriors won by 25 runs.
TU Cricket Ground, Kirtipur
Player of the match: Paras Khadka (Vishal Warriors)

- Sagarmatha Legends won the toss and elected to field.

Match 6
27 September
9:30 A.M

Jagdamba Rhinos; 124/8 (20 overs)	v	Kantipur Gurkhas; 113/8 (20 overs)
Sandeep Jhora 42*(28); Prem Tamang 2-15 (4 overs)		Sompal Kami 44 (30); Basant Regmi 3-20 (4 overs)

Jagadamba Rhinos won by 11 runs
TU Cricket Ground, Kirtipur
Player of the match: Sompal Kami (Jagadamba Rhinos)

- Kantipur Gurkhas won the toss and elected to field.

Match 7
27 September
1:15 P.M

Colors X-Factors; 168/6 (20 overs)	v	Sagarmatha Legends; 159/6 (20 overs)
Rajesh Pulami 56 (38); Mehaboob Alam 2-20 (4 overs)		Binod Bhandari 48 (28); Avinash Karn 2-25 (4 overs)

Colors X-Factors won by 9 runs
TU Cricket Ground, Kirtipur
Player of the match: Gyanendra Malla (Colors X-Factors)

- Colors X-Factors won the toss and elected to field.

Match 8
28 September
9:30 A.M

Panchakanya Tej; 129/8 (20 overs)	v	Kantipur Gurkhas; 95/9 (20 overs)
Pushpa Thapa 38*(43); Avinash Bohra 4-28 (4 overs)		Sandeep Jhora 17*(32); Dipendra Singh Airee 4-21 (4 overs)

Panchakanya Tej won by 34 runs
TU Cricket Ground, Kirtipur
Player of the match: Dipendra Singh Airee (Panchakanya Tej)

- Kantipur Gurkhas won the toss and elected to field.

Match 9
28 September
1:15 P.M

Jagdamba Rhinos; 113/8 (16overs)	v	Vishal Warriors; 117/5 (13.3 overs)
Amit Shrestha 39 (24); Ramnaresh Giri 3-25 (3 overs)		Paras Khadka 56*(38); Shah Alam 2-23 (3 overs)

Vishal Warriors won by 6 wickets. (D/L Method)
TU Cricket Ground, Kirtipur
Player of the match: Paras Khadka (Vishal Warriors)

- Vishal Warriors won the toss and elected to field.
- Match was reduced to 16 overs after rain disturbed play during first inning with revised target of 114.

Match 10
29 September
9:30 A.M

Colors X-Factors; 124/8 (20 overs)	v	Kantipur Gurkhas; 109/7 (20 overs)
Yogeshwor Singh Karki 30 (28); Basant Regmi 2-20 (4 overs)		Pradeep Airee 31 (24)

Colors X-Factors won by 15 runs.
TU Cricket Ground, Kirtipur
Player of the match: Yogeshwor Singh Karki (Colors X-Factors)

- Kantipur Gurkhas won the toss and elected to field.

Match 11
29 September
1:15 P.M

Panchakanya Tej; 185/5 (20 overs)	v	Sagarmatha Legends; 136 (17.4 overs)
Karan KC 52(31); Bikram Sob 2-33 (4 overs)		Mehaboob Alam 23 (19); Sushil Kandel 3-4 (2 overs)

Panchakanya Tej won by 49 runs.
TU Cricket Ground, Kirtipur
Player of the match: Karan KC (Panchakanya Tej)

- Panchakanya Tej won the toss and elected to bat.

Match 12
30 September
9:30 A.M

Colors X-Factors; 112/8 (20 overs)	v	Jagdamba Rhinos; 112/9 (20 overs)
Rajesh Pulami 29 (29); Nizamuddin Halwai 3-15 (2 overs)		Mahesh Chhetri 22(22); Sanjam Regmi 4-12 (4 overs)

Colors X-Factors won on one over eliminator.
TU Cricket Ground, Kirtipur
Player of the match: Sanjam Regmi (Colors X-Factors)

- Colors X-Factors won the toss and elected to bat.

Match 13
30 September
1:15 P.M

Vishal Warriors; 142/6 (20 overs)	v	Panchakanya Tej; 143/8 (19.3 overs)
Sagar Pun 44(38); Bhuwan Karki 2-21 (4 overs)		Aarif Sheikh 47 (34); Dipesh Shrestha 4-29 (4 overs)

Panchakanya Tej won by 2 wickets.
TU Cricket Ground, Kirtipur
Player of the match: Aarif Sheikh (Panchakanya Tej)

- Vishal Warriors won the toss and elected to bat.

Match 14
1 October
9:30 A.M

Sagarmatha Legends; 127/5 (20 overs)	v	Jagdamba Rhinos; 128/2 (17.5 overs)
Mehaboob Alam 47*(30); Pawan Sarraf 3-30 (4 overs)		Shubendu Pandey 78*(52); Sunil Dhamala 1-9 (3 overs)

Jagdamba Rhinos won by 8 wickets.
TU Cricket Ground, Kirtipur
Player of the match: Shubendu Pandey (Jagadamba Rhinos)

- Jagadamba Rhinos won the toss and elected to field.

Match 15
1 October
1:15 P.M

Colors X-Factors; 37/2 (3.4 overs)	v	Vishal Warriors
Fajlur Rahman 21 (7); Ramnaresh Giri 1-18 (2 overs)

No Result
TU Cricket Ground, Kirtipur

- Colors X-Factors won the toss and elected to bat.
- Rain disturbed the play after 3.4 overs.

==== Final ====
Final
3 October
12:15 PM

Panchakanya Tej; 171/4 (20 overs)	v	Colors X-Factors; 131 (17.3 overs)
Aasif Sheikh 111*(64); Sanjam Regmi 1-20 (3 overs)		Gyanendra Malla 47 (32); Karan KC 3-35 (3 overs)

Panchakanya Tej won by 40 runs.
TU Cricket Ground, Kirtipur
Player of the match: Aasif Sheikh (Panchakanya Tej)

- Panchakanya Tej won the toss and elected to bat
- Aasif Sheikh became the first player to hit century in this tournament

== Statistics ==
Most runs
Player	Team	Runs
Aasif Sheikh	Panchakanya Tej	220
Paras Khadka	Vishal Warriors	182
Sunil Dhamala	Sagarmatha Legends	172
Gyanendra Malla	Colors X-Factors	172
Rajesh Pulami	Colors X-Factors	145

Most wickets
Player	Team	Wickets
Sushil Kandel	Panchakanya Tej	12
Karan KC	Panchakanya Tej	9
Sharad Vesawkar	Panchakanya Tej	8
Basanta Regmi	Kantipur Gurkhas	8
Dipendra Singh Airee	Panchakanya Tej	8
