= 2014 Nepal Premier League Twenty20 =

- Administrator: Cricket Association of Nepal
- Cricket format: 20 overs
- Tournament format(s): Round-robin and Knockout
- Host: Nepal
- Participants: 6
- Matches: 60
- Official website: https://www.cricketnepal.org

The 2014 Nepal Premier League Twenty20 is the first season of the Nepal Premier League. The event is organised by the Cricket Association of Nepal and managed by Zohra Sports Management. It will be organised between May–June 2014 and will comprise 20 overs and 50 overs competitions played in round-robin format followed by semi-finals and finals between the top four teams. The 50 overs tournament ran between 14 and 24 May and the 20 overs tournament will run between 4–14 June. The 50 overs tournament was held in Kailali and Kanchanpur whereas the 20 overs tournament will be held in Kathmandu.

Panchakanya Tej were the winners of the 50 overs tournament after defeating Jagdamba Giants in the final held at Fapla Cricket Ground, Dhangadi, Kailali.

== Teams and Standings ==
Team	Pld	W	L	T	NR	Pts	NRR
Panchakanya Tej	0	0	0	0	0	0	0.000
Sagarmatha Legends	0	0	0	0	0	0	0.000
Jagdamba Giants	0	0	0	0	0	0	0.000
Kantipur Gurkhas	0	0	0	0	0	0	0.000
Colors X-Factors	0	0	0	0	0	0	0.000
Vishal Warriors	0	0	0	0	0	0	0.000

== Fixtures and Results ==
The inaugural match of the 50 overs tournament was played on 4 June 2014 at the Tribhuvan University International Cricket Ground, Kathmandu between Vishal Warriors and Colors X-Factors.

=== League stage ===
4 June 2014
09:30 NST

Vishal Warriors	v	Colors X-Factors

Tribhuvan University International Cricket Ground

5 June 2014
09:30 NST

Kantipur Gurkhas	v	Panchakanya Tej

Tribhuvan University International Cricket Ground

5 June 2014
09:30 NST

Jagdamba Giants	v	Sagarmatha Legends

Tribhuvan University International Cricket Ground

6 June 2014
09:30 NST

Vishal Warriors	v	Kantipur Gurkhas

Tribhuvan University International Cricket Ground

6 June 2014
09:30 NST

Colors X-Factors	v	Panchakanya Tej

Tribhuvan University International Cricket Ground

7 June 2014
09:30 NST

Panchakanya Tej	v	Jagdamba Giants

Tribhuvan University International Cricket Ground

7 June 2014
09:30 NST

Sagarmatha Legends	v	Kantipur Gurkhas

Tribhuvan University International Cricket Ground

8 June 2014
09:30 NST

Sagarmatha Legends	v	Vishal Warriors

Tribhuvan University International Cricket Ground

8 June 2014
09:30 NST

Colors X-Factors	v	Jagdamba Giants

Tribhuvan University International Cricket Ground

9 June 2014
09:30 NST

Colors X-Factors	v	Sagarmatha Legends

Tribhuvan University International Cricket Ground

9 June 2014
09:30 NST

Jagdamba Giants	v	Vishal Warriors

Tribhuvan University International Cricket Ground

10 June 2014
09:30 NST

Panchakanya Tej	v	Sagarmatha Legends

Tribhuvan University International Cricket Ground

10 June 2014
09:30 NST

Jagdamba Giants	v	Kantipur Gurkhas

Tribhuvan University International Cricket Ground

11 June 2014
09:30 NST

Colors X-Factors	v	Kantipur Gurkhas

Tribhuvan University International Cricket Ground

11 June 2014
09:30 NST

Vishal Warriors	v	Panchakanya Tej

Tribhuvan University International Cricket Ground

=== Knockout stage ===
Semifinals
2
3
1
4

Final

=== Semifinal ===
13 June 2014

TBD (1)	v	TBD (4)

Tribhuvan University International Cricket Ground, Kirtipur, Kathmandu

13 June 2014

TBD (2)	v	TBD (3)

Tribhuvan University International Cricket Ground, Kirtipur, Kathmandu

=== Final ===
14 June 2014

TBD (Winner of SF1)	v	TBD (Winner of SF2)

Tribhuvan University International Cricket Ground, Kirtipur, Kathmandu

== Statistics ==
=== Most runs ===
Player	Team	Mat	Inns	Runs	Ave	SR	HS	100	50	4s	6s
(Nepal)											
(Nepal)											
(Nepal)											
(Nepal)											
(Nepal)											

=== Most wickets ===
Player	Team	Mat	Inns	Wkts	Ave	Econ	BBI	SR	4WI	5WI
(Nepal)										
(Nepal)										
(Nepal)										
(Nepal)										
(Nepal)										

== Match fees ==
- Captain रु 5,000 per match
- Capped players रु 2,500 per match
- Uncapped players रु 1,000 per match
