= 2012 ACC Under-19 Asia Cup =

Cricket tournament

- Dates: 23 June – 1 July 2012
- Administrator: Asian Cricket Council (ACC)
- Cricket format: 50-over
- Tournament format(s): Group stage and final
- Host: Malaysia
- Champions: India (3rd title); Pakistan (1st title)
- Runners-up: None/Joint winners
- Participants: 8
- Matches: 15
- Player of the series: (Pakistan) Sami Aslam
- Most runs: (Pakistan) Sami Aslam (461)
- Most wickets: (Sri Lanka) Tharindu Kaushal (12)

The 2012 ACC Under-19 Asia Cup was the 3rd edition of ACC Under-19 Cup. The cricket tournament was held in Malaysia from 23 June to 1 July 2012. 8 teams played in that tournament. As the final match ended in a tied, Pakistan and India were declared joint winners of the tournament.

== Teams ==
No.	Teams	Qualification method
1	India	ICC full member
2	Pakistan	ICC full member
3	Bangladesh	ICC full member
4	Sri Lanka	ICC full member
5	Malaysia	Host
6	Afghanistan	Qualifiers
7	Nepal	Qualifiers
8	Qatar	Qualifiers

== Venues ==
Pandamaran, Selangor	Bandar Kinrara, Selangor	Seri Kembangan, Selangor	Kuala Lumpur
Bayuemas Oval	Kinrara Academy Oval	Selangor Turf Club Cricket ground	Royal Selangor Club Cricket Ground
Capacity: 3,000	Capacity: 4,000	Capacity: ?	Capacity: ?

== Group stage ==
=== Group A ===
==== Points table ====
Pos	Team	Pld	W	L	T	NR	Pts	NRR	Qualification
1	Pakistan	3	3	0	0	0	9	2.125	Advanced to the Knockout stage
2	India	3	2	1	0	0	6	1.165	Advanced to the Knockout stage
3	Nepal	3	1	2	0	0	3	−0.126	
4	Malaysia (H)	3	0	3	0	0	0	−3.057	

Source: ESPNcricinfo
(H) Host

==== Matches ====
23 June 2012
10:00
Scorecard

Malaysia; 126 (39.3 overs)	v	India; 130/2 (31 overs)
Derek Duraisingam 21 (30); Vikas Mishra 4/18 (8.3 overs)		Baba Aparajith 38* (57); Anwar Rahman 2/43 (10 overs)

India won by 8 wickets
Kinrara Academy Oval, Selangor
Umpires: Raveendra Wimalasiri (SL) and Sri Ganesh (Sin)
Player of the match: Vikas Mishra (Ind)

- India won the toss and elected to field.

23 June 2012
10:00
Scorecard

Nepal; 156 (46.1 overs)	v	Pakistan; 157/2 (37.3 overs)
Naresh Budayair 34 (85); Mohammad Nawaz 2/24 (10 overs)		Sami Aslam 82* (115); Sagar Pun 1/24 (10 overs)

Pakistan won by 8 wickets
Bayuemas Oval, Selangor
Umpires: Tanvir Ahmed (Ban) and Viswanadan Kalidas (Mas)
Player of the match: Sami Aslam (Pak)

- Pakistan won the toss and elected to field.

24 June 2012
10:00
Scorecard

Pakistan; 287/7 (50 overs)	v	India; 286/8 (50 overs)
Sami Aslam 121 (149); Roosh Kalaria 4/54 (10 overs)		Vijay Zol 109* (119); Akhtar Waheed 2/54 (10 overs)

Pakistan won by 1 run
Kinrara Academy Oval, Selangor
Umpires: Raveendra Wimalasiri (SL) and Sarika Prasad (Sin)
Player of the match: Sami Aslam (Pak)

- India won the toss and elected to field.

24 June 2012
10:00
Scorecard

Nepal; 247/8 (50 overs)	v	Malaysia; 140 (43 overs)
Sagar Pun 71 (90); Sivanantha Krishnan 3/37 (10 overs)		Muhamad Syahadat 36 (70); Rahul Vishwakarma 5/30 (8 overs)

Nepal won by 107 runs
Royal Selangor Club Cricket Ground, Kuala Lumpur
Umpires: Shozab Raza (Pak) and Ashwani Kumar Rana (Tha)
Player of the match: Rahul Vishwakarma (Nep)

- Nepal won the toss and elected to bat.

26 June 2012
10:00
Scorecard

India; 176 (45.2 overs)	v	Nepal; 91 (27.3 overs)
Baba Aparajith 55 (87); Bhuvan Karki 3/23 (9 overs)		Bhuvan Karki 24 (29); Vikas Mishra 4/33 (8 overs)

India won by 81 runs (DLS method)
Bayuemas Oval, Selangor
Umpires: Tanvir Ahmed (Ban) and Narayanan Sivan (Mas)
Player of the match: Vikas Mishra (Ind)

- Nepal won the toss and elected to field.
- Match was reduced to 47 overs per side due to rain.
- Nepal were given revised target of 173 in 47 overs.

26 June 2012
10:00
Scorecard

Pakistan; 302/4 (50 overs)	v	Malaysia; 53 (30.3 overs)
Umar Waheed 76 (52); Anwar Rahman 1/40 (10 overs)		Pavithren Nadaesan 17 (43); Mohammad Nawaz 3/9 (9 overs)

Pakistan won by 249 runs
Selangor Turf Club Cricket ground, Selangor
Umpires: Raveendra Wimalasiri (SL) and Sarika Prasad (Sin)
Player of the match: Mohammad Nawaz (Pak)

- Pakistan won the toss and elected to bat.

=== Group B ===
==== Points table ====
Pos	Team	Pld	W	L	T	NR	Pts	NRR	Qualification
1	Sri Lanka	3	3	0	0	0	9	1.509	Advanced to the Knockout stage
2	Afghanistan	3	2	1	0	0	6	1.076	Advanced to the Knockout stage
3	Bangladesh	3	1	2	0	0	3	1.946	
4	Qatar	3	0	3	0	0	0	−4.810	

Source: ESPNcricinfo

==== Matches ====
23 June 2012
10:00
Scorecard

Afghanistan; 129 (34.5 overs)	v	Sri Lanka; 130/6 (36.4 overs)
Shabir Noori 25 (42); Tharindu Kaushal 4/19 (7.5 overs)		Sandun Weerakkody 42 (74); Shabir Noori 2/29 (9 overs)

Sri Lanka won by 4 wickets
Royal Selangor Club Cricket Ground, Kuala Lumpur
Umpires: Shavir Tarapore (Ind) and Vinay Kumar (Nep)
Player of the match: Tharindu Kaushal (SL)

- Afghanistan won the toss and elected to bat.

23 June 2012
10:00
Scorecard

Bangladesh; 363/7 (50 overs)	v	Qatar; 35 (11.4 overs)
Soumya Sarkar 209 (135); Loganathan Lokesh 3/43 (6 overs)		Loganathan Lokesh 9 (18); Abu Hider 9/10 (5.4 overs)

Bangladesh won by 328 runs
Selangor Turf Club Cricket ground, Selangor
Umpires: Shozab Raza (Pak) and Narayanan Sivan (Mas)
Player of the match: Soumya Sarkar & Abu Hider (Ban)

- Qatar won the toss and elected to field.

24 June 2012
10:00
Scorecard

Sri Lanka; 183 (43.2 overs)	v	Bangladesh; 140 (38 overs)
Sandun Weerakkody 69 (87); Noor Hossain 4/34 (9 overs)		Mosaddek Hossain 47 (73); Amila Aponso 4/37 (10 overs)

Sri Lanka won by 43 runs
Bayuemas Oval, Selangor
Umpires: Shavir Tarapore (Ind) and Imran Mustafa (Kuw)
Player of the match: Amila Aponso (SL)

- Sri Lanka won the toss and elected to bat.

24 June 2012
10:00
Scorecard

Afghanistan; 308 (46.4 overs)	v	Qatar; 117 (30.2 overs)
Noor-ul-Haq 53 (72); Omar Ishtiaq 3/64 (10 overs)		Tamoor Sajjad 26 (46); Javed Ahmadi 5/20 (8.2 overs)

Afghanistan won by 191 runs
Selangor Turf Club Cricket ground, Selangor
Umpires: Tanvir Ahmed (Ban) and Sun Jianxin (Chi)
Player of the match: Shabir Noori (AFG)

- Afghanistan won the toss and elected to bat.

26 June 2012
10:00
Scorecard

Bangladesh; 240/9 (50 overs)	v	Afghanistan; 223/3 (40.3 overs)
Salman Hossain 43 (75); Javed Ahmadi 3/25 (10 overs)		Javed Ahmadi 71 (94); Mosaddek Hossain 2/30 (7 overs)

Afghanistan won by 7 wickets (DLS method)
Kinrara Academy Oval, Selangor
Umpires: Shavir Tarapore (Ind) and Ashwani Kumar Rana (Tha)
Player of the match: Javed Ahmadi (AFG)

- Bangladesh won the toss and elected to bat.
- Afghanistan were given revised target of 220 in 42 overs.

26 June 2012
10:00
Scorecard

Sri Lanka; 124/2 (26 overs)	v	Qatar; 100/8 (26 overs)
Pabasara Waduge 76 (81); Ali Ishtiaq 1/25 (6 overs)		Ali Ishtiaq 24* (43); Tharindu Kaushal 3/29 (6 overs)

Sri Lanka won by 87 runs (DLS method)
Royal Selangor Club Cricket Ground, Kuala Lumpur
Umpires: Shozab Raza (Pak) and Batumalai Ramani (Mas)
Player of the match: Pabasara Waduge (SL)

- Sri Lanka won the toss and elected to bat.
- Match was reduced to 26 overs per side due to rain.
- Qatar were given revised target of 188 in 26 overs.

== Knockout stage ==
=== Bracket ===
Semifinals
A1	Pakistan	296/3 (50 Overs)
B2	Afghanistan	145 (40.5 Overs)
B1	Sri Lanka	244/7 (50 overs)
A2	India	247/4 (47.1 overs)

Final
A1	Pakistan	282/9 (50 overs)
A2	India	282/8 (50 overs)

=== Semi finals ===
28 June 2012
10:00
Scorecard

Pakistan; 296/3 (50 Overs)	v	Afghanistan; 145 (40.5 Overs)
Umar Waheed 77* (69); Sharafudin 1/43 (10 overs)		Mohibullah Oryakhel 41 (77); Azizullah 4/44 (8.5 overs)

Pakistan won by 151 runs
Kinrara Academy Oval, Selangor
Umpires: Tanvir Ahmed (Ban) and Sri Ganesh (Sin)
Player of the match: Imam-ul-Haq (Pak)

- Pakistan won the toss and elected to bat.

29 June 2012
10:00
Scorecard

Sri Lanka; 244/7 (50 overs)	v	India; 247/4 (47.1 overs)
Sandun Weerakkody 73 (75); Baba Aparajith 2/29 (10 overs)		Unmukt Chand 116 (141); Tharindu Kaushal 2/60 (10 overs)

India won by 4 wickets
Kinrara Academy Oval, Selangor
Umpires: Imran Mustafa (Kuw) and Vinay Kumar (Nep)
Player of the match: Unmukt Chand (Ind)

- Sri Lanka won the toss and elected to bat.

=== Final ===
1 July 2012
10:00
Scorecard

Pakistan; 282/9 (50 overs)	v	India; 282/8 (50 overs)
Sami Aslam 134 (124); Roosh Kalaria 5/37 (10 overs)		Unmukt Chand 121 (150); Mohammad Nawaz 3/45 (10 overs)

Match tied
Kinrara Academy Oval, Selangor
Umpires: Raveendra Wimalasiri (SL) and Sarika Prasad (Sin)
Player of the match: Unmukt Chand (Ind) & Sami Aslam (Pak)

- India won the toss and elected to bat.
- After the match was tied, both teams shared the trophy.

== Final standings ==
Pos.	Team
1	India
1	Pakistan
3	Sri Lanka
4	Afghanistan
5	Bangladesh
6	Nepal
7	Malaysia
8	Qatar
