= Raj Pradhan =

Personal information
- Full name: Raj Kumar Pradhan
- Born: 27 April 1973 (age 53); Nepal
- Batting: Right-handed
- Bowling: Leg spin
- Role: Bowler

International information
- National side: Nepal

Domestic team information
- Years: Team
- 2014–2014: Panchakanya Tej
- 2003–2014: Biratnagar

Career statistics
Competition	First-class
Matches	4
Runs scored	5
Batting average	2.50
100s/50s	0/0
Top score	4
Balls bowled	314
Wickets	5
Bowling average	33.40
5 wickets in innings	0
10 wickets in match	0
Best bowling	2/23
Catches/stumpings	1/–
- Source: CricketArchive, 13 July 2014

Raj Pradhan (Nepali: राज कुमार प्रधान) (born 27 April 1973) is a former Nepalese cricketer. Raj is a right-handed batsman and a leg spin bowler. He made his debut for Nepal against UAE in July 2002.

He also represented the Panchakanya Tej of the Nepal Premier League and Region no. 1 Biratnagar of the National League.

== Biography ==
Born in 1973, Raj Pradhan first played for Nepal at the 2002 ACC Trophy in Singapore. He made his first-class début in 2004 when he played for Nepal against the UAE and Malaysia in the 2004 ICC Intercontinental Cup. Later in the year he played in the ACC Trophy in Kuala Lumpur as well as ACC Fast Track Countries Tournament matches against Singapore and the UAE.

In February 2005 he played in the repêchage tournament of the 2005 ICC Trophy, in which Nepal finished third after beating Qatar in a play-off. He also played ACC Fast Track Countries Tournament matches against Singapore, Malaysia, the UAE and Hong Kong

In 2006, he played in a match against Namibia in Windhoek in the 2006 ICC Intercontinental Cup. Following this he went on a tour of Pakistan with Nepal before playing in the ACC Trophy. He also represented Nepal in the 2008 ACC Trophy Elite.

However, despite his impressive performance with the national team, he was forced to quit cricket in the middle and go to Qatar to earn money and support his family. He left the national team in 2009 and went to Qatar, where he played club cricket and impressed one and all with his bowling. He was even offered to play for the Qatar national team but he declined the offer thinking it would be a disrespect to Nepal, and returned home to play for Nepal again. He represented Nepal again after six years when he was selected in Nepal squad for the 2014 ACC Premier League.

He was among the 19 players who were called in the close-camp for 2014 Asian Games. But he left the close-camp and went Japan for foreign employment in August 2014.
