= Avinash Karn =

Nepalese cricketer

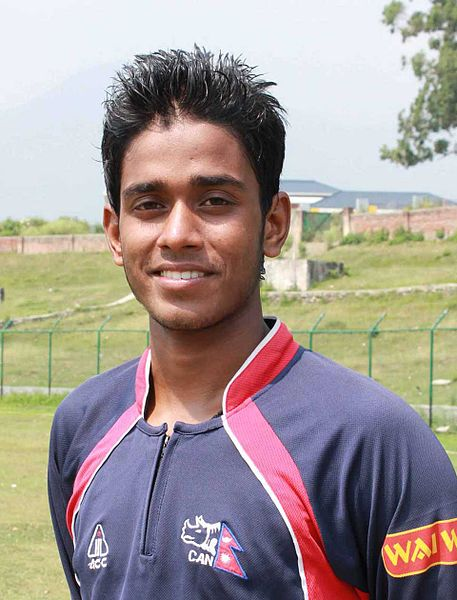

Personal information
- Born: 4 February 1995 (age 31)
- Nickname: Avi
- Height: 5 ft 10 in (1.78 m)
- Batting: Right-handed
- Bowling: Left-arm medium-fast
- Role: Bowler

International information
- National side: Nepal (2015–2015)
- T20I debut (cap 16): 30 June 2015 v Netherlands
- Last T20I: 1 July 2015 v Netherlands

Domestic team information
- Years: Team
- 2013–2015: Nepal Army (National League)
- 2014–2014: Colors X-Factors (NPL)
- 2015–2015: Sunrise HSS (SPA Cup)

Career statistics
Competition	T20I	LA	T20
Matches	2	2	7
Runs scored	4	20	4
Batting average	4.00	20.00	4.00
100s/50s	0/0	0/0	0/0
Top score	4	17	4
Balls bowled	48	42	144
Wickets	1	0	7
Bowling average	49.00	–	19.42
5 wickets in innings	0	–	0
10 wickets in match	0	–	0
Best bowling	1/31	–	2/14
Catches/stumpings	0/–	0/–	1/–
- Source: CricketArchive, 1 August 2015

Avinash Karn (Nepali: अविनाश कर्ण) (born 4 February 1995) is a Nepalese professional cricketer. Karn is a right-handed batsman and a left-arm medium-fast bowler. He made his debut for Nepal against Afghanistan in August 2013.

He represents the Nepal Army Club of the National League, Colors X-Factors of the Nepal Premier League and Sunrise Higher Secondary School, which plays in the SPA Cup.

He has currently moved to Australia and is playing for Strathfield in the 2024/2025 Sydney Shires competition.

== Playing career ==
Avinash is the second Nepalese bowler after Mehboob Alam to pick up all 10 wickets in a limited overs match. He single-handedly bowled out Baitadi in the U-19 National Cricket Tournament by picking up all 10 wickets for 24 runs in 6.1 overs.

He also represented Nepal Under-19s in the 2013 ACC Under-19 Elite Cup in May 2013. He was the best bowler of the tournament taking total of 24 wickets which included an eight-wicket haul and a hat-trick against Bahrain Under-19. Then he was selected in national team's squad for the 2013 ACC Emerging Teams Cup, where he played against Afghanistan and under-23 age level teams of the Test nations – India and Pakistan. He was a part of the team in the 2013 ICC World Twenty20 Qualifier as Nepal qualified for the 2014 ICC World Twenty20.

He made List A debut in 2014 World Cup Qualifier in New Zealand in January 2014. Karn was selected in Nepal's squad for the 2014 ICC World Twenty20 in Bangladesh, their maiden appearance in the ICC global event, but was eventually replaced by Anil Mandal after he suffered an injury to his right knee and, therefore, was ruled out of the tournament.

He made his Twenty20 International debut for Nepal against the Netherlands on 30 June 2015.
