= Mehboob Alam (cricketer) =

Nepalese cricketer

Personal information
- Born: 31 August 1981 (age 45); Rajbiraj, Saptari, Nepal
- Batting: Left-handed
- Bowling: Left-arm fast
- Role: All-rounder

International information
- National side: Nepal

Domestic team information
- Years: Team
- 2003–2015: Sagarmatha Legends
- 2013–2015: Pentagon
- 2014–2014: Biratnagar

Career statistics
Competition	First-class	Twenty20
Matches	4	7
Runs scored	98	34
Batting average	14.00	5.66
100s/50s	0/0	0/0
Top score	34	13
Balls bowled	414	42
Wickets	12	1
Bowling average	14.83	47.20
5 wickets in innings	0	0
10 wickets in match	0	0
Best bowling	3/25	1/20
Catches/stumpings	1/–	2/–
- Source: CricketArchive, 9 March 2015

Mehboob Alam (Nepali: मेहबूब आलम) (born 31 August 1981) is a Nepalese cricketer. An all-rounder Mehboob bats left-handed and is a left-arm fast bowler. He made his debut for Nepal against Japan in November 2000.

Mehboob is a world record holder who has his name in the Guinness World Records for single-handedly bowling out an opponent, which he did by picking up 10 wickets for 12 runs in 7.5 overs bundling out Mozambique for just 19 runs during the 2008 ICC World Cricket League Division Five in Jersey. This was the best bowling figure in a Limited over cricket match.

He represents the Sagarmatha Legends of the Nepal Premier League, Region No.1 Biratnagar of the National League and Pentagon International College, which plays in the SPA Cup.

== Playing career ==
Born in Rajbiraj in 1981, Mehboob Alam first represented Nepal at Under-19 level, playing in the Under-19 World Cup in Sri Lanka in 2000. He made his debut for the senior side later that year, playing in the ACC Trophy in the United Arab Emirates.

He played in three matches in the 2001 ICC Trophy in Ontario, and played in the 2002 ACC Trophy in Singapore, helping guide Nepal to the final.

In 2003, he scored 256 runs in a 40-over match between Saptari and Udayapur districts in the Birendra Memorial National League Regional. At Pashupati School Ground of Siraha, Mehboob astonished everyone by hitting 26 fours and 18 sixes in his 123-ball knock.

He made his first-class debut in 2004, playing against the UAE and Malaysia in the 2004 ICC Intercontinental Cup.

By this time he had become a key figure for Nepal, winning seven man of the match awards between 2004 and 2006. He also played in the 2004 ACC Trophy in Malaysia and an ACC Fast Track Countries Tournament match against Singapore in 2004. In 2005 he played in the repêchage tournament of the 2005 ICC Trophy, in which Nepal finished third after beating Qatar in a play-off. Alam was named man of the match for the play-off after taking 5/11. He also played in the ACC Fast Track Countries Tournament against Singapore, Malaysia, the UAE and Hong Kong.

In 2006, he played in a play-off match against Namibia to decide the final spot in the 2006 ICC Intercontinental Cup. Needing an outright win to qualify, Nepal could only secure a draw after there was no play on the first day. Later in the year he played on a tour of Pakistan with Nepal in addition to playing in the 2006 ACC Trophy and ACC Premier League. He also took seven wickets when Nepal bowled out Myanmar for just 10 off 12.1 overs in 2006 ACC Trophy.

Mehboob is one of the most decorated cricketers of the country who has his name in the Guinness World Records. On 25 May 2008, he became the first bowler to take all ten wickets in an innings in an ICC recognized international tournament match. Playing for Nepal in the 2008 Division Five game against Mozambique he took all ten wickets at a cost of 12 runs as Mozambique were bowled out for 19 in 14.5 overs. Later, he made an important 51 in the victory over Norway. In February 2010 he represented Nepal in 2010 Division Five, which was held in Nepal.

Mehboob also holds the record of highest Twenty20 score by a Nepalese batsman slamming 88 off 41 against Saudi Arabia during the 2011 ACC Twenty20 Cup. After going through a patchy form in the 2012 ICC World Twenty20 Qualifier, Mehboob was excluded from the team and was replaced by former Nepal captain Binod Das but he managed to come back in the 2014 ACC Premier League where he took three wickets against the UAE and scored a half-century against Malaysia. He also represented Nepal in the 2014 ICC World Cricket League Division Three
