= List of Nepal Twenty20 International cricketers =

A Twenty20 International (T20I) is an international cricket match between two teams that have official T20I status, as determined by the International Cricket Council. It is played under the rules of Twenty20 cricket and is the shortest format of the game. The first such match was played on 17 February 2005 between Australia and New Zealand. The Nepal national cricket team played their first T20I match on 16 March 2014, against Hong Kong as part of the 2014 ICC World Twenty20, winning the match by 80 runs.

This list comprises all members of the Nepal national cricket team who have played at least one T20I match. It is initially arranged in the order in which each player won his first Twenty20 International cap. Where more than one player won his first Twenty20 International cap in the same match, those players are listed alphabetically by last name.

== Key ==
General

- ‡ – Captain
- † – Wicket-keeper
- First – Year of debut
- Last – Year of latest game
- Mat – Number of matches played

Batting

- Runs – Runs scored in career
- HS – Highest score
- * – Batsman remained not out
- Avg – Runs scored per dismissal
- 50 – Number of half centuries
- 100 – Centuries scored

Bowling

- Balls – Balls bowled in career
- Wkt – Wickets taken in career
- BBI – Best bowling in an innings
- Ave – Average runs per wicket

Fielding

- Ca – Catches taken
- St – Stumpings made

== Players ==
Statistics are correct as of 8 June 2026.

| Cap | Name | First | Last | Mat | Batting | | | | | Bowling | | | | Fielding | | Ref(s) |
| Cap | Name | First | Last | Mat | Runs | HS | Avg | 50 | 100 | Balls | Wkt | BBI | Ave | Ca | St | Ref(s) |
|---|---|---|---|---|---|---|---|---|---|---|---|---|---|---|---|---|
| 1 | Binod Bhandari† | 2014 | 2024 | 40 | 405 | 58* | 16.87 | 2 | 0 | – | – | – | – | 13 | 8 | |
| 2 | Naresh Budhayer | 2014 | 2014 | 4 | 7 | 5 | 3.50 | 0 | 0 | – | – | – | – | 0 | 0 | |
| 3 | Shakti Gauchan | 2014 | 2015 | 9 | 13 | 6* | 4.33 | 0 | 0 | 180 | 8 | 3/9 | 21.12 | 0 | 0 | |
| 4 | Paras Khadka‡ | 2014 | 2020 | 33 | 799 | 106* | 27.55 | 4 | 1 | 348 | 8 | 2/11 | 45.00 | 16 | 0 | |
| 5 | Subash Khakurel† | 2014 | 2015 | 8 | 112 | 56 | 14.00 | 1 | 0 | – | – | – | – | 2 | 3 | |
| 6 | Gyanendra Malla‡ | 2014 | 2022 | 45 | 883 | 107 | 23.23 | 2 | 1 | – | – | – | – | 23 | 0 | |
| 7 | Jitendra Mukhiya | 2014 | 2022 | 10 | 6 | 5 | 6.00 | 0 | 0 | 156 | 10 | 3/18 | 16.80 | 3 | 0 | |
| 8 | Basanta Regmi | 2014 | 2019 | 18 | 24 | 11 | 3.42 | 0 | 0 | 373 | 25 | 4/16 | 16.20 | 4 | 0 | |
| 9 | Sagar Pun | 2014 | 2015 | 9 | 90 | 20 | 10.00 | 0 | 0 | 141 | 6 | 3/26 | 21.83 | 2 | 0 | |
| 10 | Sompal Kami | 2014 | 2026 | 92 | 392 | 40 | 11.52 | 0 | 0 | 1,740 | 89 | 3/20 | 23.32 | 29 | 0 | |
| 11 | Sharad Vesawkar | 2014 | 2022 | 20 | 325 | 40 | 23.21 | 0 | 0 | 30 | 0 | – | – | 9 | 0 | |
| 12 | Amrit Bhattarai | 2014 | 2014 | 1 | 2 | 2 | 2.00 | 0 | 0 | 18 | 1 | 1/12 | 12.00 | 0 | 0 | |
| 13 | Rajesh Pulami | 2014 | 2015 | 6 | 52 | 25 | 8.66 | 0 | 0 | – | – | – | – | 0 | 0 | |
| 14 | Pradeep Airee† | 2015 | 2022 | 12 | 91 | 29 | 7.58 | 0 | 0 | – | – | – | – | 5 | 1 | |
| 15 | Karan KC | 2015 | 2026 | 91 | 495 | 45 | 14.14 | 0 | 0 | 1,771 | 112 | 5/21 | 20.45 | 29 | 0 | |
| 16 | Avinash Karn | 2015 | 2015 | 2 | 4 | 4 | 4.00 | 0 | 0 | 48 | 1 | 1/31 | 49.00 | 0 | 0 | |
| 17 | Anil Mandal | 2015 | 2015 | 2 | 11 | 9 | 5.50 | 0 | 0 | – | – | – | – | 1 | 0 | |
| 18 | Aarif Sheikh | 2018 | 2026 | 51 | 592 | 39* | 18.50 | 0 | 0 | 96 | 4 | 1/2 | 33.00 | 10 | 0 | |
| 19 | Dipendra Singh Airee | 2018 | 2026 | 100 | 2,220 | 110* | 34.15 | 12 | 1 | 1,292 | 62 | 4/18 | 20.85 | 43 | 0 | |
| 20 | Sandeep Lamichhane‡ (Note: Sandeep Lamichhane also played for World XI. Only his records for Nepal are given above.) | 2018 | 2026 | 77 | 82 | 16* | 5.85 | 0 | 0 | 1,762 | 142 | 5/9 | 12.67 | 27 | 0 | |
| 21 | Lalit Rajbanshi | 2018 | 2026 | 38 | 8 | 3 | 2.66 | 0 | 0 | 737 | 36 | 3/6 | 22.11 | 9 | 0 | |
| 22 | Anil Sah† | 2018 | 2025 | 14 | 218 | 41 | 16.76 | 0 | 0 | – | – | – | – | 10 | 0 | |
| 23 | Abinash Bohara | 2019 | 2024 | 62 | 23 | 12 | 3.28 | 0 | 0 | 1,210 | 75 | 6/11 | 19.70 | 11 | 0 | |
| 24 | Sundeep Jora | 2019 | 2026 | 43 | 510 | 63 | 18.21 | 4 | 0 | – | – | – | – | 19 | 0 | |
| 25 | Rohit Paudel‡ | 2019 | 2026 | 84 | 1,845 | 61 | 28.82 | 9 | 0 | 239 | 14 | 2/7 | 18.64 | 42 | 0 | |
| 26 | Pawan Sarraf | 2019 | 2022 | 17 | 145 | 27* | 10.35 | 0 | 0 | 120 | 3 | 1/3 | 39.00 | 8 | 0 | |
| 27 | Kushal Malla | 2019 | 2026 | 65 | 1,133 | 137* | 25.17 | 5 | 1 | 409 | 25 | 4/33 | 16.88 | 19 | 0 | |
| 28 | Ishan Pandey | 2019 | 2019 | 4 | 33 | 22 | 8.25 | 0 | 0 | – | – | – | – | 1 | 0 | |
| 29 | Sushan Bhari | 2019 | 2021 | 9 | 1 | 1* | 0.50 | 0 | 0 | 168 | 8 | 2/22 | 26.37 | 0 | 0 | |
| 30 | Rashid Khan | 2019 | 2024 | 2 | 3 | 3 | 3.00 | 0 | 0 | 42 | 1 | 1/48 | 67.00 | 0 | 0 | |
| 31 | Bhuvan Karki | 2020 | 2020 | 1 | – | – | – | – | – | 24 | 1 | 1/6 | 6.00 | 0 | 0 | |
| 32 | Aasif Sheikh† | 2021 | 2026 | 76 | 1,790 | 69 | 24.86 | 11 | 0 | – | – | – | – | 38 | 16 | |
| 33 | Kushal Bhurtel | 2021 | 2026 | 80 | 2,325 | 129 | 32.74 | 15 | 3 | 440 | 31 | 4/12 | 16.38 | 41 | 0 | |
| 34 | Shahab Alam | 2021 | 2026 | 10 | 0 | 0* | – | 0 | 0 | 184 | 6 | 1/15 | 42.16 | 4 | 0 | |
| 35 | Kamal Singh Airee | 2021 | 2022 | 10 | 18 | 13 | 6.00 | 0 | 0 | 205 | 15 | 3/15 | 14.80 | 0 | 0 | |
| 36 | Sagar Dhakal | 2022 | 2024 | 6 | 0 | 0* | – | 0 | 0 | 120 | 2 | 1/19 | 81.00 | 0 | 0 | |
| 37 | Bibek Yadav | 2022 | 2024 | 19 | 91 | 39 | 10.11 | 0 | 0 | 55 | 1 | 1/14 | 89.00 | 6 | 0 | |
| 38 | Lokesh Bam | 2022 | 2026 | 27 | 269 | 44* | 17.93 | 0 | 0 | – | – | – | – | 12 | 0 | |
| 39 | Gulsan Jha | 2022 | 2026 | 57 | 669 | 54 | 20.27 | 1 | 0 | 537 | 29 | 3/31 | 22.06 | 18 | 0 | |
| 40 | Dilip Nath† | 2022 | 2022 | 4 | 15 | 15* | 7.50 | 0 | 0 | – | – | – | – | 0 | 1 | |
| 41 | Mohammad Aadil Alam | 2022 | 2025 | 12 | 142 | 31 | 12.90 | 0 | 0 | 138 | 9 | 4/24 | 17.44 | 6 | 0 | |
| 42 | Basir Ahamad | 2022 | 2026 | 8 | 137 | 80 | 45.66 | 1 | 0 | 36 | 2 | 2/30 | 24.50 | 1 | 0 | |
| 43 | Arjun Saud† | 2022 | 2026 | 4 | 83 | 35 | 20.75 | 0 | 0 | – | – | – | – | 2 | 2 | |
| 44 | Mousom Dhakal | 2023 | 2023 | 2 | – | – | – | – | – | 36 | 1 | 1/29 | 43.00 | 1 | 0 | |
| 45 | Pratis GC | 2023 | 2024 | 10 | 7 | 6* | 3.50 | 0 | 0 | 204 | 8 | 3/13 | 34.37 | 2 | 0 | |
| 46 | Aakash Chand | 2024 | 2024 | 3 | 2 | 2 | 2.00 | 0 | 0 | 60 | 7 | 3/27 | 8.40 | 1 | 0 | |
| 47 | Rijan Dhakal | 2024 | 2025 | 8 | 6 | 5 | 6.00 | 0 | 0 | 156 | 6 | 2/17 | 35.00 | 5 | 0 | |
| 48 | Dev Khanal | 2024 | 2024 | 3 | 31 | 18 | 10.33 | 0 | 0 | – | – | – | – | 2 | 0 | |
| 49 | Nandan Yadav | 2025 | 2026 | 19 | 81 | 37 | 20.25 | 0 | 0 | 323 | 22 | 2/18 | 19.18 | 4 | 0 | |
| 50 | Rupesh Singh | 2025 | 2025 | 4 | 65 | 43* | 32.50 | 0 | 0 | 60 | 2 | 1/32 | 48.00 | 2 | 0 | |
| 51 | Kiran Thagunna | 2025 | 2025 | 2 | 25 | 15 | 12.50 | 0 | 0 | — | — | — | — | 0 | 0 | |
| 52 | Bhim Sharki | 2025 | 2025 | 2 | 39 | 27 | 19.50 | 0 | 0 | — | — | — | — | 0 | 0 | |
| 53 | Sher Malla | 2026 | 2026 | 4 | 0 | 0 | 0.00 | 0 | 0 | 78 | 8 | 4/32 | 11.00 | 3 | 0 | |
| 54 | Hemant Dhami | 2026 | 2026 | 2 | — | — | — | — | — | 30 | 2 | 2/20 | 20.00 | 1 | 0 | |
| 55 | Santosh Yadav | 2026 | 2026 | 1 | 1 | 1 | 1.00 | 0 | 0 | 6 | 0 | — | — | 0 | 0 | |

== Captains ==
| No. | Name | First | Last | Matches | Won | Lost | Tied | No Result | Win% |
|---|---|---|---|---|---|---|---|---|---|
| 1 | Paras Khadka | 2014 | 2019 | 27 | 11 | 15 | 0 | 1 | 42.30 |
| 2 | Gyanendra Malla | 2019 | 2021 | 12 | 9 | 3 | 0 | 0 | 75.00 |
| 3 | Sandeep Lamichhane | 2022 | 2022 | 18 | 13 | 5 | 0 | 0 | 72.22 |
| 4 | Rohit Paudel | 2023 | 2026 | 59 | 33 | 21 | 3 | 2 | 60.52 |
| 5 | Dipendra Singh Airee | 2026 | 2026 | 6 | 5 | 1 | 0 | 0 | 83.33 |

== See also ==
- List of Nepal Twenty20 International records
- List of Nepal ODI cricketers
- List of Nepalese First-class cricketers
- List of Nepalese List A cricketers
- List of Nepalese Twenty20 cricketers
