= Mahesh Chhetri =

Nepalese cricketer

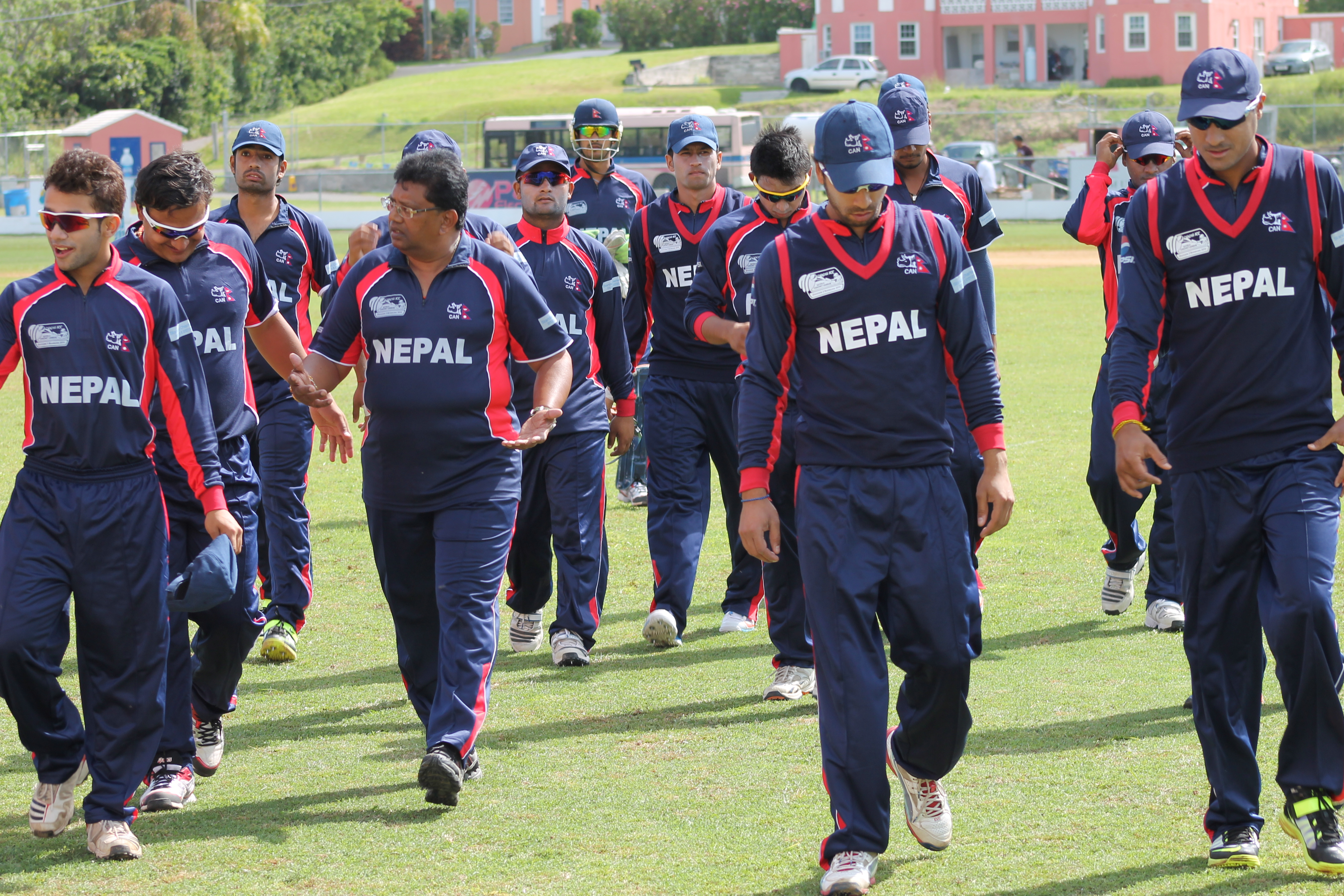

Personal information
- Full name: Mahesh Kumar Chhetri
- Born: 26 January 1988 (age 38); Nepal
- Batting: Right-handed
- Role: Opening Batsman and Wicket-keeper

Domestic team information
- Years: Team
- 2013–2015: Nepal Army
- 2014–2014: Jagdamba Giants
- 2013–2013: Pentagon

Career statistics
Competition	List A
Matches	4
Runs scored	52
Batting average	13.00
100s/50s	0/0
Top score	21
Catches/stumpings	3/1
- Source: CricketArchive, 1 August 2015

Mahesh Kumar Chhetri (Nepali: महेश कुमार क्षेत्री) (born 26 January 1988) is a Nepalese cricketer. Mahesh is a right-handed opening batsman and a wicket-keeper. He made his debut for Nepal against Singapore in April 2005.

He represents the Jagdamba Giants of the Nepal Premier League, Nepal Army Club of the National League and Pentagon International College, which plays in the SPA Cup.

== Playing career ==
Chhetri has played in the U-15 Asia Cup 2002/3, the ACC U-17 cup 2003/4, the ACC Fast Track Countries Tournament 2005, the ACC Under-19 Cup 2005/6, the 2006 ICC Under-19 Cricket World Cup, the 2006 ACC Trophy, the 2007 ACC Under-19 Elite Cup, the 2007 ACC Twenty20 Cup, the 2008 ICC Under-19 Cricket World Cup, 2008 Division Five, 2008 ACC Trophy Elite, 2009 ACC Twenty20 Cup, 2010 Division Five and later in the 2014 World Cup Qualifier.

In the 2015 National One Day Cricket Tournament, he scored 384 runs in 7 innings at an average of 54.86, with three fifties and a century. He was awarded the Player of the Tournament award as his side, Nepal Army Club, won the title. He played for Troon Cricket Club, a cricket club in England, in Cornwall Cricket League Division 2 in July 2015. He scored an unbeaten 64 runs in a match against Gulval Cricket Club and dismissed a batsman by stumping. He was subsequently selected in Nepal's squad for the 2015–17 ICC World Cricket League Championship's matches against Scotland.
