= Paresh Lohani =

Nepalese cricketer (born 1980)

Personal information
- Full name: Paresh Prasad Lohani
- Born: 19 August 1980 (age 46); Kathmandu, Nepal
- Batting: Right-handed
- Bowling: Right-arm medium
- Role: Batsman

International information
- National side: Nepal

Domestic team information
- Years: Team
- 2011–2015: APF
- 2014: Sagarmatha Legends
- 2015: GoldenGate

Career statistics
Competition	First-class	Twenty20
Matches	4	4
Runs scored	133	24
Batting average	22.16	6.00
100s/50s	0/0	0/0
Top score	49	12
Catches/stumpings	3/–	0/–
- Source: CricketArchive, 8 March 2015

Paresh Prasad Lohani (born 19 August 1980) is a Nepalese cricketer. Paresh is a right-handed batsman and a right-arm medium pace bowler. He made his debut for Nepal against United Arab Emirates in November 2000.

He represents the Sagarmatha Legends of the Nepal Premier League, APF Club of the National League and GoldenGate International College, which plays in the SPA Cup.

== Playing career ==
Born in Kathmandu in 1980, Lohani first played for Nepal in the 2000 ACC Trophy in the United Arab Emirates. He played matches against the UAE, Japan, the Maldives and Hong Kong during the tournament. He played in the 2001 ICC Trophy in Ontario, Canada the following year.

He played in the ACC Trophy again in 2002 and 2004, making his first-class début in the latter year when he played in the 2004 ICC Intercontinental Cup against the UAE and Malaysia. He played ACC Fast Track Countries Tournament matches against Singapore, Nepal and Hong Kong later the same year.

In February 2005 he played in the repêchage tournament of the 2005 ICC Trophy, in which Nepal finished third after beating Qatar in a play-off. He also played ACC Fast Track Countries Tournament matches against Singapore, Malaysia, the UAE and Hong Kong. The games against the UAE and Hong Kong also counted towards the 2005 ICC Intercontinental Cup and are his last first-class matches to date. He won the man of the match award in the match against Singapore after scoring a total of 172 runs in the match, including an unbeaten century in the second innings.

The following year, he played in a play-off match against Namibia to decide the final spot in the 2006 ICC Intercontinental Cup. Needing an outright win to qualify, Nepal could only secure a draw after there was no play on the first day. Later in the year he played on a tour of Pakistan with Nepal in addition to playing in the ACC Trophy and ACC Premier League.

He also represented Nepal at the 2007 ACC Twenty20 Cup and 2012 ICC World Twenty20 Qualifier.
