= Shakti Gauchan =

Former Nepalese cricketer

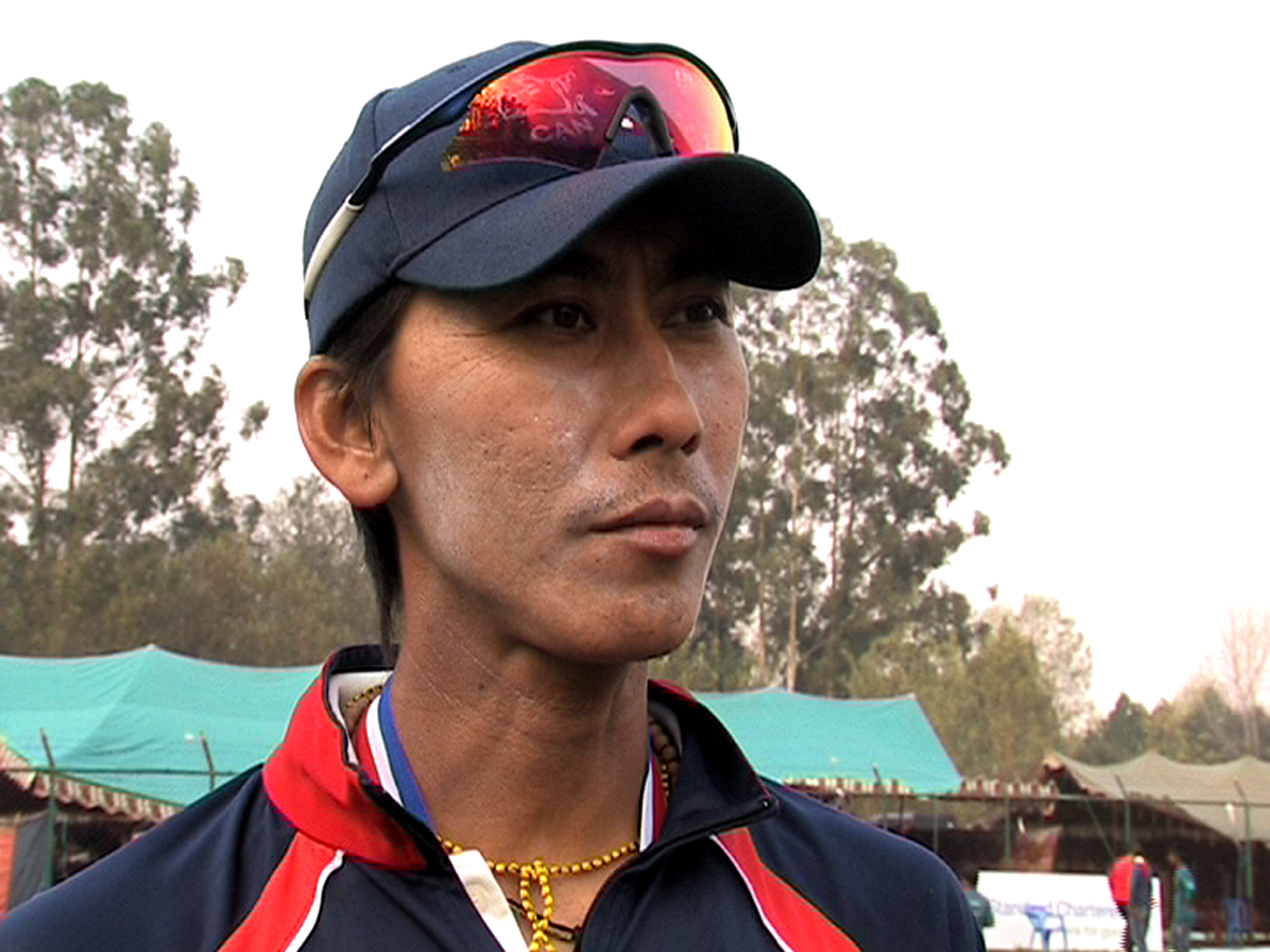

Personal information
- Full name: Shakti Prasad Gauchan
- Born: 22 April 1984 (age 42); Kolkata, India
- Nickname: Shakti the power
- Height: 6 ft 1 in (1.85 m)
- Batting: Right-handed
- Bowling: Slow left-arm orthodox
- Role: Bowler

International information
- National side: Nepal (2002–2018)
- Only ODI (cap 3): 1 August 2018 v Netherlands
- T20I debut (cap 3): 16 March 2014 v Hong Kong
- Last T20I: 17 July 2015 v Papua New Guinea
- T20I shirt no.: 44

Domestic team information
- Years: Team
- 2011–2015: APF
- 2014: Jagdamba Giants
- 2015: New Horizon
- 2017–2018: Pokhara Rhinos

Career statistics
| Competition | ODI | T20I | FC | LA |
|---|---|---|---|---|
| Matches | 1 | 9 | 4 | 24 |
| Runs scored | 9 | 13 | 157 | 163 |
| Batting average | – | 4.33 | 34.20 | 18.11 |
| 100s/50s | 0/0 | 0/0 | 0/1 | 0/0 |
| Top score | 9* | 6* | 69* | 37* |
| Balls bowled | 24 | 180 | 252 | 1,009 |
| Wickets | 0 | 8 | 5 | 18 |
| Bowling average | – | 21.12 | 21.40 | 36.00 |
| 5 wickets in innings | – | 0 | 0 | 0 |
| 10 wickets in match | – | 0 | 0 | 0 |
| Best bowling | – | 3/9 | 2/18 | 2/16 |
| Catches/stumpings | 1/– | 0/– | 5/– | 5/– |
- Source: ESPNcricinfo, 21 June 2022

Shakti Prasad Gauchan (Nepali: शक्ति प्रसाद गौचन) (born 22 April 1984) is a Nepalese former professional cricketer. An all-rounder, Shakti is a right-handed batsman and a left-arm orthodox spinner. He is considered as the best Nepali left arm orthodox bowler in Nepalese cricket history especially on T20 world cup 2014. His unbeaten 106 off 103 balls against Italy during the ICC World Cup Qualifying Series in February 2005 made him only the second Nepalese cricketer to score an international century.

He was the captain of Jagdamba Giants of the Nepal Premier League. He also represented the APF Club of the National League and New Horizon College, which played in the SPA Cup. He was one of the eleven cricketers to play in Nepal's first ever One Day International (ODI) match, against the Netherlands, in August 2018. Shakti Gauchan become head coach of Bhairahawa Queens (franchise cricket team of NCL women's league) in March 2019.

== Playing career ==
Gauchan represented Nepal at Under-17 level in February 2001 when he played in the ACC Under-17 Asia Cup in Bangladesh. He played in the 2002 ICC Under-19 World Cup in New Zealand the following year, also making his debut for the senior side in the 2002 ACC Trophy in Singapore.

He spent the next two years in the Under-19 side, playing on a tour of India and the Youth Asia Cup in Pakistan in 2003 and the 2004 ICC Under-19 World Cup in Bangladesh. He returned to the senior side in March 2004 when he made his first-class debut in the 2004 ICC Intercontinental Cup against the UAE, also playing against Malaysia in the same tournament.

Gauchan bowled 2.28 runs per over and took seven wickets, also scored 248 runs in total at an average of 41.33 including two half centuries.

He also played in the ACC Trophy and in ACC Fast Track Countries Tournament matches against Singapore, the UAE and Hong Kong in 2004. In 2005, he played in the Repêchage Tournament of the 2005 ICC Trophy, in which Nepal finished third after beating Qatar in a play-off.

In 2006, he played in a play-off match against Namibia to decide the final spot in the 2006 ICC Intercontinental Cup. Needing an outright win to qualify, Nepal could only secure a draw after there was no play on the first day. Later in the year, he played on a tour of Pakistan with Nepal in addition to playing in the ACC Trophy and ACC Premier League. He also represented his country at the 2007 ACC Twenty20 Cup.

After being left out of the squad for the 2010 Asian Games as well as the 2011 ACC Twenty20 Cup, Gauchan was considered a misfit for the youngest version of the game among the supporters and lovers of Nepal cricket. However, Gauchan fought for and secured a place in the Twenty20 squad for the 2012 ICC World Twenty20 Qualifier. Gauchan justified his selection, silenced all his critics and rose to limelight once again after taking a total of 16 wickets, becoming the second leading wicket-taker in the 2012 ICC World Twenty20 Qualifier in UAE, which included a hat-trick against Denmark. He was one of the two Nepalese players besides skipper Paras Khadka to be chosen in the best XI of the tournament by ESPNcricinfo. After the 2012 ICC World Twenty20 Qualifier, Gauchan was called by popular IPL franchise Rajasthan Royals. He impressed in the training; he bowled Indian cricket maestro Rahul Dravid and took the wicket of Australian batsman Brad Hodge. Rajasthan Royals later tweeted about Gauchan saying, 'For now, Shakti Gauchan will be training and gaining valuable experience at the nets. Nevertheless, a great leap ahead for Nepali cricket.' In the 2012 ICC World Cricket League Division Four, he set up Nepal's convincing victory over Malaysia, with a new record. The left-arm orthodox spinner's figures of 10-8-2-3 in their division 4 match is the best economical bowling spell ever in limited over encounters. Had it been a One Day International (ODI) match, he would have shifted West Indies’ Phil Simmons to the second place. Simmons' figures of 10-8-3-4 against Pakistan in 1992 stands as the best in the ODIs.

He got 15 wickets in the 2012 ACC Trophy Elite, 16 wickets in the 2012 ICC World Twenty20 Qualifier and 10 wickets in the 2012 Division Four are some of Gauchan's major contributions in recent tournaments.

In the 2014 ICC World Twenty20 in Bangladesh, he was phenomenal in Nepal's 80 run win over Hong Kong in the first group match and was awarded the man of the match for his impressive 3 wicket haul. He took total of 5 wickets playing three matches in the tournament. He took 5 wickets during the 2014 Asian Games with an exceptional economy rate of just 3.54. He also took 10 wickets in the 2014 ICC World Cricket League Division Three at an average of 12.80 and an exceptional economy rate of just 2.87.

In the 2015 ICC World Cricket League Division Two, he picked up 7 wickets at an average of 21.57 and an economy of 3.40.

Former New Zealand cricketer Iain O'Brien openly admired Shakti on his Twitter page and suggested county cricket clubs of New Zealand to pick him up. "Can a county please pick up Nepal's Shakti Gauchan for two reasons; a) he's awesome b) I'd love to learn all about him and his cricket," he tweeted.

In July 2018, he was named in Nepal's squad for their One Day International (ODI) series against the Netherlands. These were Nepal's first ODI matches since gaining ODI status during the 2018 Cricket World Cup Qualifier. He made his ODI debut for Nepal against the Netherlands on 1 August 2018, which also was his last international match representing Nepal.

== Personal life ==
Gauchan was born in Gorkha army camp in Calcutta, India. He studied in GRD school in Gorakhpur, India.
