= Siddhant Lohani =

Nepalese cricketer

Personal information
- Born: 2 March 1995 (age 31); Biratnagar, Nepal
- Batting: Right-handed
- Bowling: Leg break
- Role: Batsman

International information
- National side: Nepal

Domestic team information
- Years: Team
- 2015–2015: Biratnagar (National League)
- 2014–2014: Colors X-Factors (NPL)
- 2015–2015: Merryland (SPA Cup)

Career statistics
Competition	T20
Matches	1
Runs scored	27
Batting average	27.00
100s/50s	0/0
Top score	27
Balls bowled	18
Wickets	0
Bowling average	–
5 wickets in innings	0
10 wickets in match	0
Best bowling	–
Catches/stumpings	0/–
- Source: CricketArchive, 18 July 2015

Siddhant Lohani (Nepali: सिद्धान्त लोहनी) (born 2 March 1995) is a Nepalese cricketer. Lohani is a right-handed batsman and a leg break bowler. He made his debut for Nepal against Jersey in July 2015. He represents the Region No.1 Biratnagar of the National League, Colors X-Factors of the Nepal Premier League and Merryland College, which plays in the SPA Cup.

== Playing career ==
Siddhant first represented Nepal Under-19s in the 2014 ACC Under-19 Asia Cup.

He plays for Region no. 1 Biratnagar in the domestic league. He scored a half century off just 19 balls and went on to score 67 runs off 25 balls against Region no. 8 Pokhara in the Senior One-Day National Cricket Tournament 2015. His man of the match performance included six fours and six sixes. In the final of Kathmandu Cricket League 2015, he scored 31 runs off 15 balls as his team, Dhagahdi United, lifted the trophy.

Siddhant, known his ability to play 360 degree shots, was subsequently selected for 2015 ICC World Twenty20 Qualifier. He made his Twenty20 debut in the tournament against Jersey. Playing his debut match for Nepal, he scored 27 off 16 balls with 2 fours and 2 sixes, including a helicopter shot and caused a run out. On 19 October 2016, at a match played at the Birendranagar Cricket Club, Pathari, Siddhant scored 127 runs off just 45 balls. He hit 12 sixes and 8 fours for Seven Star Club, Itahari and won the man of the match award.

== Personal life ==
He considers South African skipper AB de Villiers as his role model.
