= Binod Das =

Nepalese cricketer

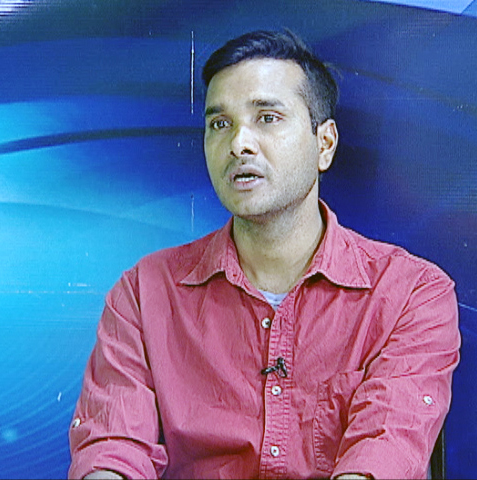

Personal information
- Full name: Binod Kumar Das
- Born: 26 April 1983 (age 43); Kalaiya, Bara, Nepal
- Batting: Right-handed
- Bowling: Right-arm medium
- Role: All-rounder

Domestic team information
- Years: Team
- 2014–2014: Panchakanya Tej

Career statistics
Competition	First-class
Matches	3
Runs scored	56
Batting average	28.00
100s/50s	0/0
Top score	17
Balls bowled	566
Wickets	19
Bowling average	11.42
5 wickets in innings	3
10 wickets in match	0
Best bowling	6/29
Catches/stumpings	1/–
- Source: CricketArchive, 11 April 2015

Binod Kumar Das (Nepali: विनोद कुमार दास; born 26 April 1983) is a Nepalese former cricketer and a former captain of Nepal national cricket team. All-rounder Binod is a right-handed batsman and a right-arm medium pace bowler. He made his debut for Nepal against UAE in November 2000.

Under his captaincy, Nepal Under-19s participated in the 2000 Under-19 World Cup in Sri Lanka, finished as a Plate Runners-up in the 2002 Under-19 World Cup in New Zealand and Nepal won the 2006 ACC Premier League.

== Playing career ==
Binod Das first played for Nepal at Under-19 level. He played in the 1997 Youth Asia Cup in Hong Kong and 1999 Youth Asia Cup in Singapore, where Nepal finished as runners-up. Then he led Nepal in the 2000 Under-19 World Cup, their first ever Under-19 World Cup. He was the leading Nepalese wicket-taker in the tournament with 9 wickets from 5 matches at an average of 16.88 and an economy of 3.81. He also played in the 2000 ICC Under-17 Asia Cup in Pakistan later in the year, before making his debut for the senior side in the 2000 ACC Trophy.

After playing in the 2001 ICC Trophy in Ontario, he returned to the Under-19 team for the 2002 Under-19 World Cup in New Zealand. He led the team to finish the tournament as plate runners-up and defeat two ICC full members, Pakistan and Bangladesh. In a group match against Namibia, he picked up 3 wickets to secure a close victory. He was adjudged the man of the match. He scored 131 runs in 7 innings at an average of 21.83 and picked up 11 wickets at an average of 19.36 and an economy rate of 3.45 in the tournament. Then he represented Nepal in the 2002 ACC Trophy, 2002/03 ACC Emerging Nations Tournament and 2003/04 ACC Emerging Nations Tournament.

He made first-class debut in March 2004 when he played for Nepal against the UAE in the 2004 ICC Intercontinental Cup. Playing his debut match, he picked up 6 wickets, including a five-wicket haul in the first innings. He also played in the 2004 ACC Trophy and in the 2004/05 ACC Fast Track Countries Tournament, where he was the sixth highest wicket-taker with 12 wickets from 4 matches including a five-wicket haul against Hong Kong.

In February 2005 he played in the repêchage tournament of the 2005 ICC Trophy, where he scored 135 runs in 5 innings at an average of 45.00 and picked up 6 wickets at an average of 22.16 and an economy rate of 3.48.

He also played 2005/06 ACC Fast Track Countries Tournament matches against Singapore, Malaysia, the UAE and Hong Kong. He was the leading wicket-taker of the tournament with 21 wickets from 4 matches at an average of 8.67. The matches against the UAE and Hong Kong were also counted towards the 2005 ICC Intercontinental Cup. Including these two matches, he played a total of three first-class matches. He scored 56 runs at an average of 28.00 and picked up 19 wickets at an average of 11.42 including three five-wicket hauls. His bowling figures of 6/29 in an innings and 7/37 in a match are the best bowling figures by a Nepalese bowler in the first-class format.

In 2006, he toured Pakistan with the Nepalese team to play a match against Pakistan Cricket Academy, where he picked up the wicket of future Pakistani player Khurram Manzoor.

== Coaching ==
Binod Das is an ACC Level III certified coach. He coached the CAN-XI team during the Uttarakhand Gold Cup in India in 2013. He was appointed as an Assistant Coach of national team when the team was preparing for 2015 ICC World Cricket League Division Two. He has also been coaching the students enrolled at the National Cricket Academy. He is also the coach of Panchakanya Tej of the Nepal Premier League. He also coaches in the Nepal Cricket School.
