= Bhuvan Karki =

Nepalese cricketer (born 1994)

Bhuwan Karki

Personal information
- Born: 28 January 1994 (age 32); Dhangadhi, Nepal
- Batting: Left-handed
- Bowling: Left-arm orthodox spin
- Role: Bowler

International information
- National side: Nepal
- Only T20I (cap 31): 4 March 2020 v Thailand

Domestic team information
- Years: Team
- 2014–2014: Panchakanya Tej
- 2011–2015: APF
- 2013–2015: Sudur Pashchimanchal Academy

Career statistics
Competition	T20I	List A
Matches	1	1
Runs scored	–	2
Batting average	–	2.00
100s/50s	–	0/0
Top score	–	2
Balls bowled	24	60
Wickets	1	1
Bowling average	6.00	31.00
5 wickets in innings	0	0
10 wickets in match	0	0
Best bowling	1/6	1/31
Catches/stumpings	0/-	1/–
- Source: Cricinfo, 23 September 2025

Bhuwan Karki (also spelled as Bhuvan Karki or Bhuban Karki) (Nepali: भुवन कार्की) (born 28 January 1994) is a Nepalese cricketer who plays for the national cricket team. He is a left-handed batsman and a left-arm orthodox spinner. He made his debut against Kuwait in October 2012.

He has also represented Nepal national under-19 cricket team in the 2011 ACC Under-19 Elite Cup, 2011 ICC Under-19 World Cup Qualifier, 2012 ACC Under-19 Asia Cup, 2012 ICC Under-19 World Cup, 2013 ACC Under-19 Elite Cup, 2013/14 ACC Under-19 Asia Cup and several other tournaments.

He represents the Panchakanya Tej of the Nepal Premier League, APF Club of the National League and Sudur Pashchimanchal Academy, which plays in the SPA Cup.

== Playing career ==
He won the man of the series award in the 2014 Nepal Premier League by taking 14 wickets in the tournament. Then he was selected in Nepal's squad for the 2014 Asian Games, where he picked of 2 wickets against Maldives.

He was also selected for the 2014 ICC World Cricket League Division Three. He and picked up seven wickets in just the two matches he played, including four wickets in the final match against Uganda, which helped Nepal win the tournament.

He made List A debut against Kenya in the 2015 ICC World Cricket League Division Two in Namibia in January 2015.

He made his Twenty20 International (T20I) debut for Nepal, against Thailand, on 4 March 2020.
