= Sagar Pun =

Nepalese cricketer

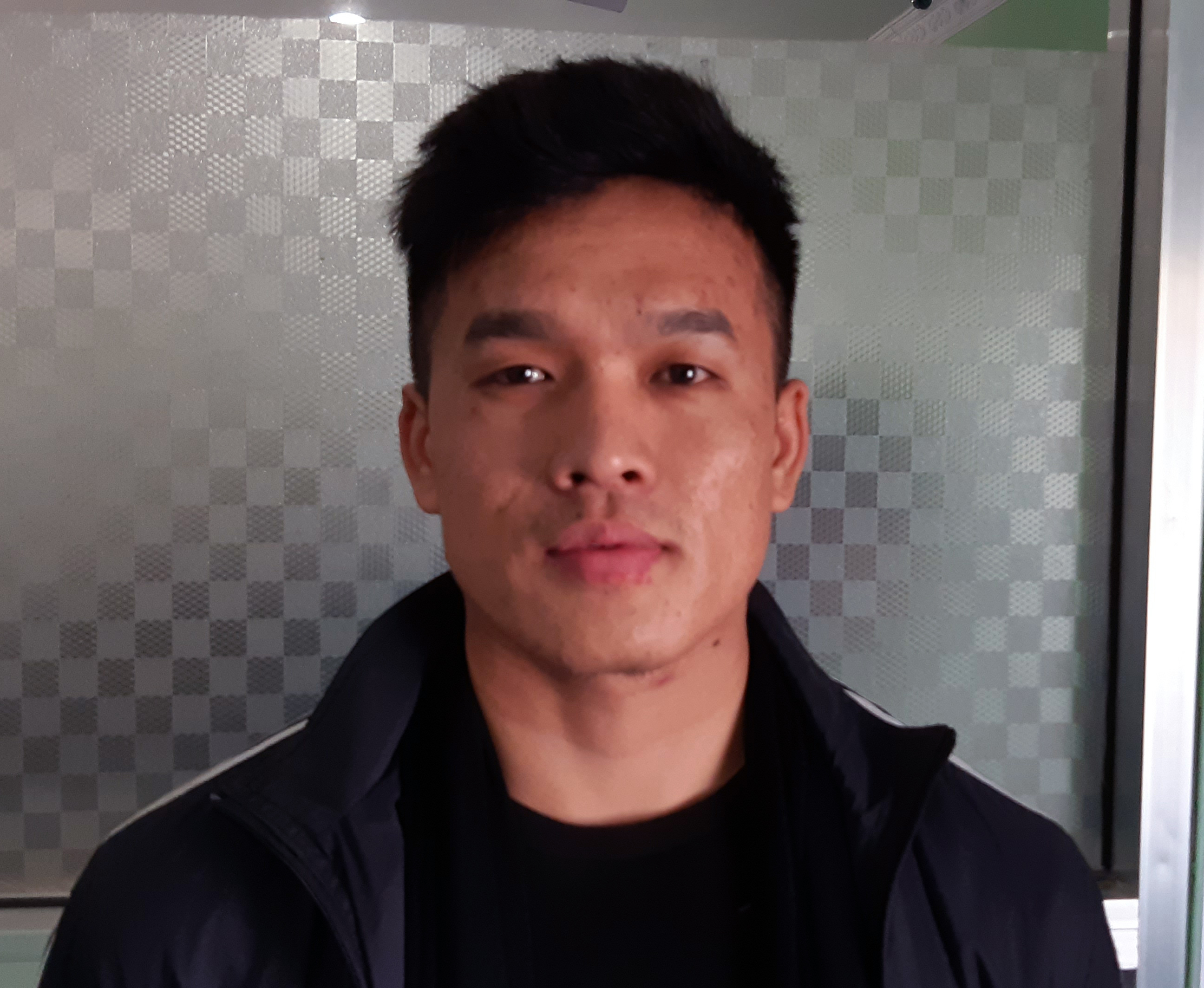

Personal information
- Born: 1 March 1993 (age 33); Nepal
- Height: 5 ft 9 in (1.75 m)
- Batting: Right-handed
- Bowling: Right-arm off break
- Role: All-rounder

International information
- National side: Nepal
- Only ODI (cap 15): 30 August 2018 v UAE
- T20I debut (cap 9): 16 March 2014 v Hong Kong
- Last T20I: 17 July 2015 v Papua New Guinea
- T20I shirt no.: 7

Domestic team information
- Years: Team
- 2014: Vishal Warriors
- 2015: Nepal Army
- 2015: Pentagon
- 2015: Kurunegala Sports Club

Career statistics
Competition	T20I	LA	T20
Matches	9	22	21
Runs scored	90	237	209
Batting average	10.00	11.85	11.61
100s/50s	0/0	0/0	0/0
Top score	20	47	22
Balls bowled	141	777	249
Wickets	6	19	11
Bowling average	21.83	25.63	25.27
5 wickets in innings	0	0	0
10 wickets in match	0	0	0
Best bowling	3/26	3/18	3/12
Catches/stumpings	2/–	9/–	6/–
- Source: CricketArchive, 29 September 2021

Sagar Pun (Nepali: सागर पुन) (born 1 March 1993) is a Nepalese professional cricketer. An All-rounder, Sagar is a right-handed batsman and a right-arm off break bowler. He made his debut for Nepal against Singapore in March 2013.

He plays for the Nepal Army Club of the National League, Vishal Warriors of the Nepal Premier League and Pentagon International College, which plays in the SPA Cup.

== Playing career ==
Sagar Pun is one of the most talented Nepali cricketers, having qualified for the national team following his consistent performance in the U-19 tournaments and national games.

Sagar made his debut in the 2013 ACC Twenty20 Cup match against Singapore – the only match he played in the event. Sagar remained in the national team system and impressed the team management enough to be picked for the 2013 ACC Emerging Teams Cup in August 2013 in Singapore.

Sagar marked a fine one-day debut with a prized scalp of Afghanistan skipper Mohammad Nabi in the Emerging Teams Cup, a tournament where he scored an unbeaten 52 against the U-23 team of India. Following his impressive performance in Singapore, Sagar cemented his place in the senior team and never looked back.

After poor results by regular opener Pradeep Airee, Sagar was promoted in the 2013 ICC World Twenty20 Qualifier in UAE. Sagar batted with a positive body language despite not converting his scores into big ones.

Sagar played a vital role in Nepal's win against Afghanistan in the 2014 ICC World Twenty20 in Bangladesh. He bowled 3 overs and conceded just 10 runs, helping Nepal to seal the 9-run victory over Afghanistan, their first victory since 2004 in any format against their old rivals.

Sagar took 7 wickets during the 2014 Asian Games at an average of 5.57. He had an exceptional economy rate of just 3.90. He scored 107 runs in the 2014 ICC World Cricket League Division Three, including a half-century against Uganda, in three innings at an average of 53.50 and picked up 8 wickets.

In February 2015, he went to Sri Lanka after being recruited by Kurunegala Sports Club to play in the Emerging Trophy Tournament, three-day cricket tournament.

In August 2018, he was named in Nepal's squad for the 2018 Asia Cup Qualifier tournament. He made his One Day International (ODI) debut for Nepal against the United Arab Emirates on 30 August 2018.
