= Rahul Vishwakarma =

Nepalese cricketer (born 1992)

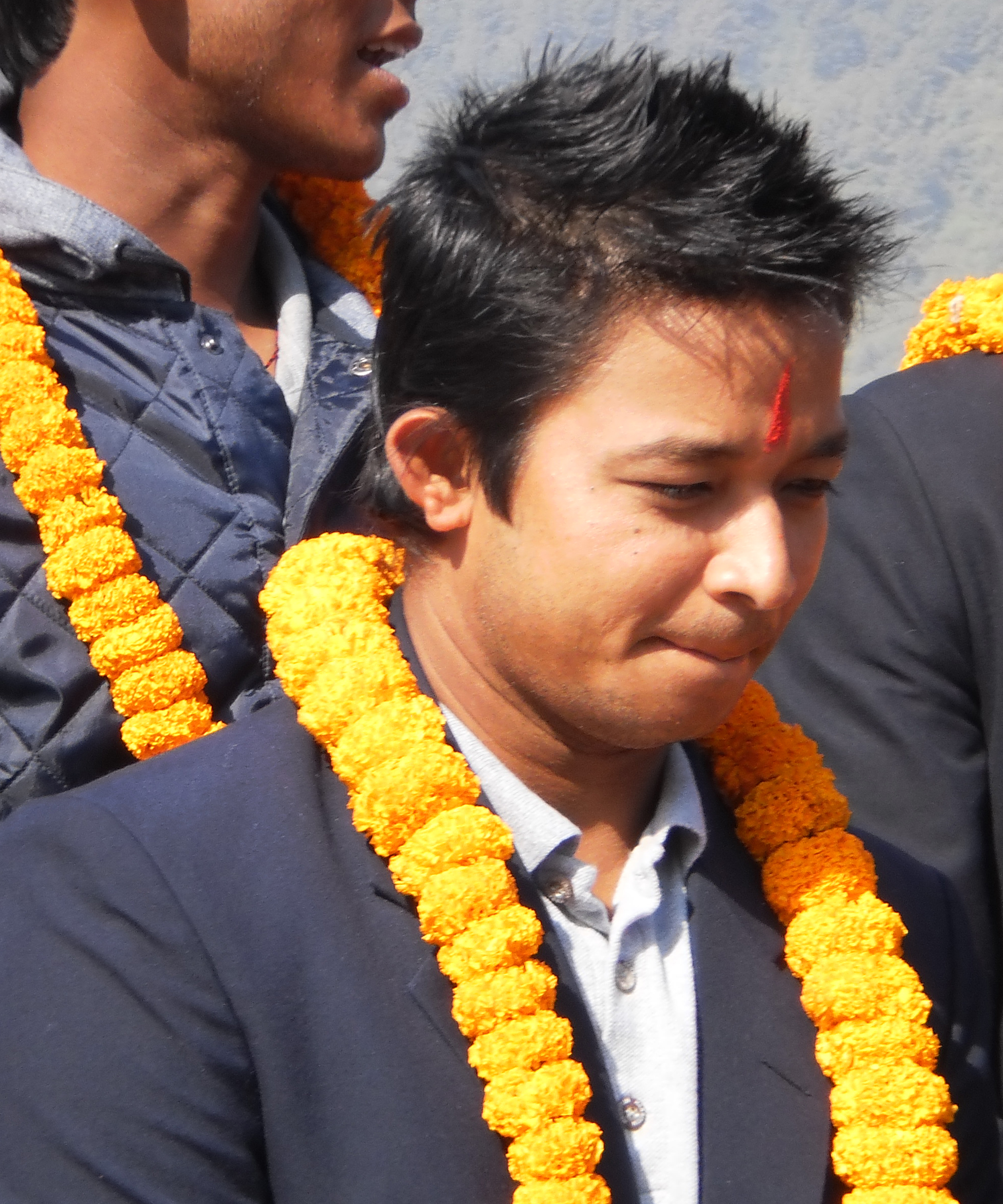

Personal information
- Born: 19 October 1992 (age 34); Butwal, Rupandehi, Nepal
- Batting: Left-handed
- Bowling: Left-arm orthodox spin
- Role: Bowler

International information
- National side: Nepal

Domestic team information
- Years: Team
- 2014–2014: Sagarmatha Legends (EPL)
- 2013–2015: Nepal Army (National League)
- 2015–2015: Pentagon (SPA Cup)

Career statistics
Competition	Youth ODI
Matches	11
Runs scored	108
Batting average	13.50
100s/50s	0/0
Top score	33*
Balls bowled	478
Wickets	23
Bowling average	14.21
5 wickets in innings	1
10 wickets in match	0
Best bowling	6/3
Catches/stumpings	2/-
- Source: ESPNcricinfo, 9 March 2015

Rahul Vishwakarma (Nepali: राहुल विश्वकर्मा) (born 19 October 1992) is a Nepalese cricketer. He is a left-handed batsman and a left-arm orthodox spinner. He made his debut for Nepal against Malaysia in October 2007.

He played for the Sagarmatha Legends of the Everest Premier League, Nepal Army Club of the National League and Pentagon International College, which plays in the SPA Cup.

== Career ==
Vishwakarma first appeared in the 2007 ACC Under-19 Elite Cup. He was selected in the senior squad that same year. The spinner debuted against Malaysia in the 2007 ACC Twenty20 Cup and got three wickets in his first match.

Vishwakarma participated in the 2010 Division Five, which Nepal hosted. In the final against the United States, Vishwakarma led his team to victory with career-best figures of 7/15, and was declared the Man of the Match.

In his last two games for Nepal during the 2013 Division Three tournament held in Bermuda, Vishwakarma took a total of five wickets.

He took seven wickets against USA in the 2010 Division Five, five wickets against Tanzania in the 2010 Division Four, three against Italy and two against Uganda in the final of the 2013 Division Three, and three wickets against Oman in the 2010 ACC Trophy Elite tournament.
