= Manjeet Shrestha =

Nepalese cricketer (born 1984)

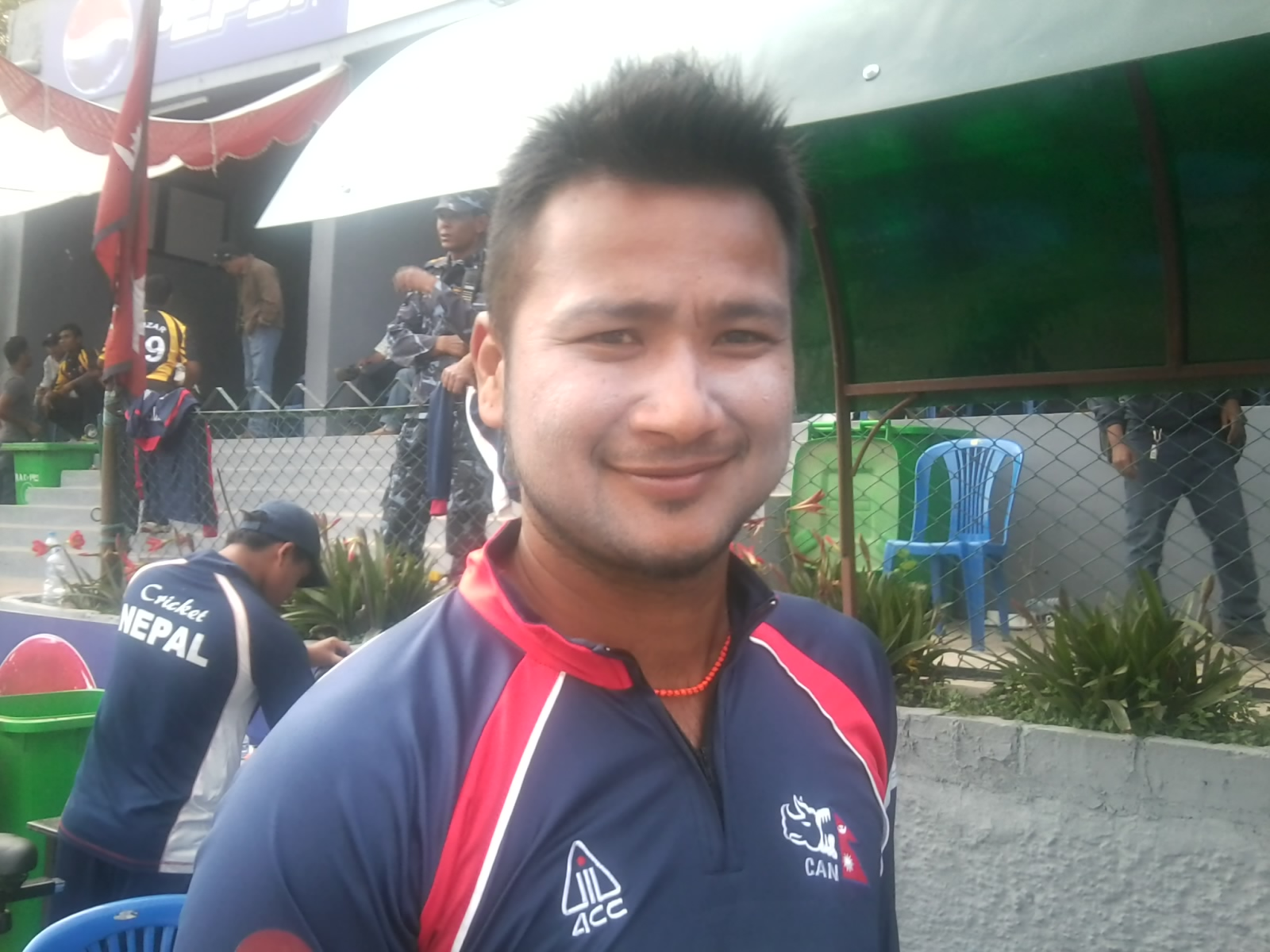

Personal information
- Full name: Manjeet Shrestha
- Born: 30 November 1984 (age 41); Biratnagar, Nepal
- Height: 5 ft 10 in (1.78 m)
- Batting: Right-handed
- Bowling: Right-arm medium
- Role: All-rounder

International information
- National side: Nepal

Domestic team information
- Years: Team
- 2014–2014: Vishal Warriors (NPL)
- 2010–2015: Biratnagar (National League)
- 2011–2015: Merryland (SPA Cup)

Career statistics
Competition	Youth ODI
Matches	14
Runs scored	142
Batting average	12.90
100s/50s	0/0
Top score	29
Balls bowled	516
Wickets	19
Bowling average	20.47
5 wickets in innings	0
10 wickets in match	0
Best bowling	4/15
Catches/stumpings	2/-
- Source: CricketArchive, 9 March 2015

Manjeet Shrestha (Nepali: मञ्जित श्रेष्ठ) (born 30 November 1984) is a Nepalese cricketer. All-rounder Manjeet is a right-handed batsman and a right-arm medium-pace bowler. He made his debut for Nepal against Hong Kong in October 1998 during the ACC Trophy tournament.

He represents the Vishal Warriors of the Nepal Premier League, Region no. 1 Biratnagar of the National League and Merryland College, which plays in the SPA Cup.

== Playing career ==
Manjeet was awarded Player of the Series award in the 2011 SPA Cup.
