= Panchakanya Tej =

- पन्चकन्या तेज
- Nickname: PT
- League: Everest Premier League

Personnel
- Captain: Sharad Vesawkar
- Coach: Kalam Ali
- Owner: Panchakanya Group
- Manager: Gopal Wagley

Team information
- Founded: 2014

History
- Nepal Premier League wins: 1 (2014)
- Everest Premier League wins: 1 (2016 Everest Premier League)
- Notable players: Sharad Vesawkar; Dipendra Singh Airee; Bhuwan Karki; Karan KC; Aarif Sheikh

Panchakanya Tej or Panchakanya Tez, TEJ, (Nepali: पन्चकन्या तेज) was a team in the 2016 Everest Premier League. The team was captained by Nepalese player Sharad Vesawkar. The head coach of the team was Kalam Ali.

The franchise earlier won the One Day tournament of the 2014 Nepal Premier League after defeating Jagdamba Giants in the final. It also won the inaugural edition of the Everest Premier League, defeating Colors X-Factors in the final.

== Players ==
- Sharad Vesawkar (c)
- Sunny Pun
- Sushil Kandel
- Bhuwan Karki
- Karan KC
- Aarif Sheikh
- Sanjay Shrestha
- Sonu Tamang
- Puspa Thapa
- Dipendra Singh Airee
- Prithu Baskota
- Aasif Sheikh
- Kushal Bhurtel
- Nirmal Thapa
