= Naresh Budhayer =

Canadian cricketer

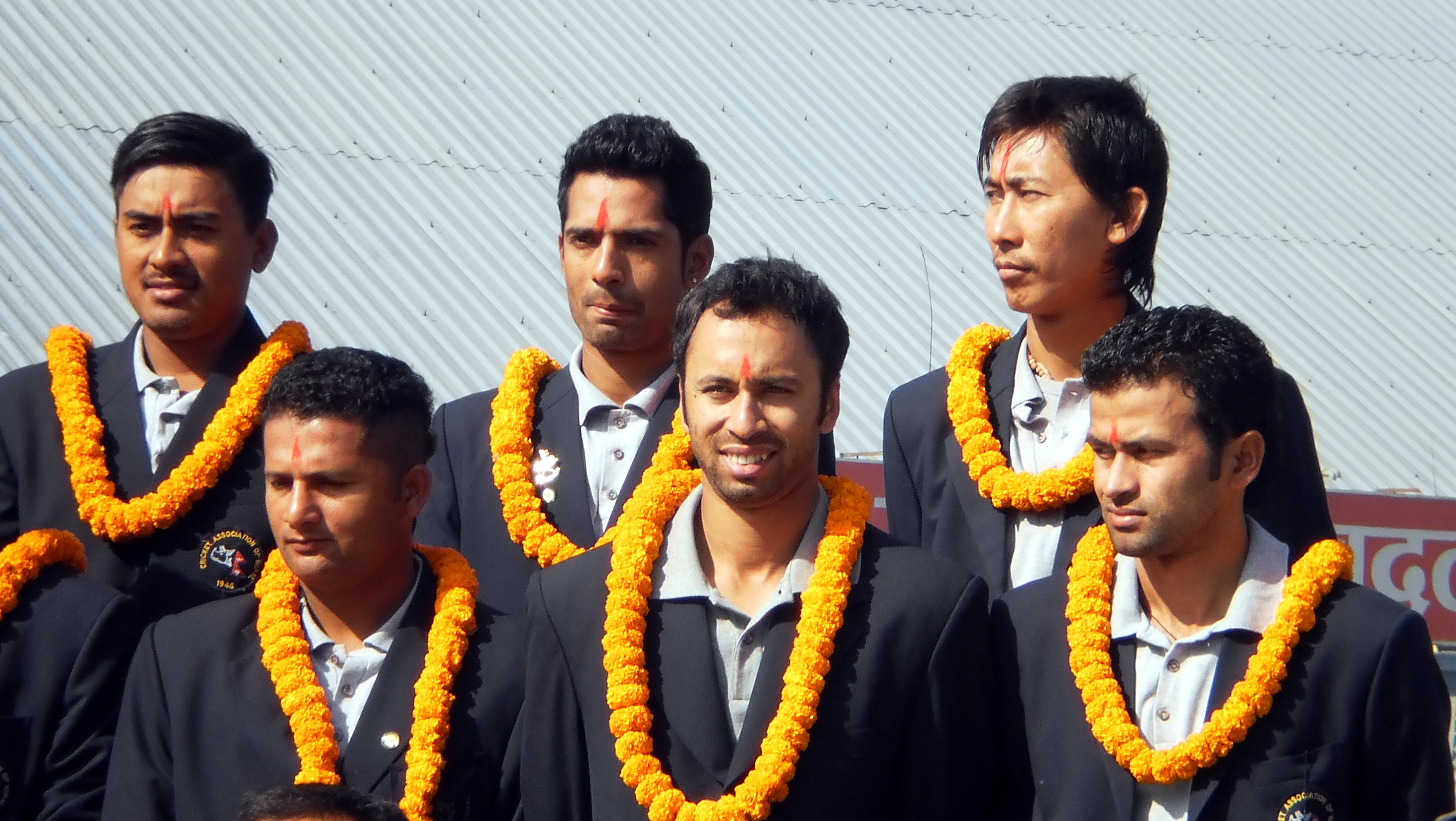

Personal information
- Full name: Naresh Bahadur Budhayer
- Born: 15 October 1991 (age 35); Kanchanpur District, Nepal
- Batting: Right-handed
- Bowling: Right-arm off break
- Role: Batsman

International information
- National side: Nepal (2014)
- T20I debut (cap 2): 16 March 2014 v Hong Kong
- Last T20I: 24 November 2014 v Hong Kong
- T20I shirt no.: 56

Domestic team information
- Years: Team
- 2013–2015: Nepal Army
- 2013–2015: Pentagon
- 2014: Jagdamba Giants

Career statistics
Competition	T20I	LA
Matches	4	6
Runs scored	7	39
Batting average	3.50	6.50
100s/50s	0/0	0/0
Top score	5	16
Catches/stumpings	0/–	3/–
- Source: CricketArchive, 29 September 2021

Naresh Bahadur Budhayer (last name also spelled as Budayair) (Nepali: नरेश बहादुर बुढाऐर) (born 15 October 1991) is a Nepalese-born Canadian cricketer. He is a right-handed batsman and a right-arm off break bowler. In 2022, he gave up his Nepalese citizenship and adopted Canadian nationality. He was called in close camp of Canada national team in 2022. He made his debut for Nepal against Bahrain in November 2009.

He represented the Nepal Army Club of the National League, Jagdamba Giants of the Nepal Premier League and Pentagon International College, which played in the SPA Cup.

== Playing career ==
=== Nepal ===
After making his debut for Nepal in the 2009 ACC Twenty20 Cup, he was in the squad for the 2010 Asian Games in Guangzhou, China under then-coach Roy Dias but did not play a single match in the tournament. After the departure of Dias, Naresh missed to be a part of Nepal's glorious years of cricket under new coach Pubudu Dassanayake before finally making a comeback in the team for the 2014 ICC World Twenty20. Budhayer had other chances come his way but has never had the opportunity to carry his team to a victory. During the 2013 ICC World Cricket League Division Three, Budhayer was included in the Nepal team that went to Bermuda in place of Gyanendra Malla, whose tour was uncertain due to some VISA issues. Budhayer made the trip to Bermuda but didn't get to play a single match for Nepal; what he did experience was the environment of the dressing room and the experience of touring with the national squad.

Budhayer was the highest run scorer for Nepal during the U-19 World Cup selection tournament where he scored 232 runs altogether and Budhayer also proved his potential during the 2011 ACC Under-19 Elite Cup where he remained not out in the entire series besides final and scored a total of 121 runs at an average of 121.

Budhayer's name became popular among the growing Nepali cricket fan base after he made a peculiar record of scoring a century against New Zealand during the 2012 U-19 World Cup warm-up match, and he has made good contributions for Nepal in the age divisions.

Naresh was awarded Player of the Series award in the 2013 SPA Cup. He scored 123 runs in four matches at an average of 41.00 and took seven wickets at the economy of 6.17. Later Budhayer, along with another Nepalese youngster Rajesh Pulami, was selected by Marylebone Cricket Club (MCC) to train in its special youth program in England. While both players completed the scholarship programme that provided batting training and match exposure, Naresh stayed back further for one month and involved himself in the third tier cricket of England.

Budhayer represented Nepal in the 2014 ACC Premier League where he opened the batting of Nepal along with Subash Khakurel. He also opened Nepal's batting in the 2014 ICC World Cricket League Division Three, where he scored 198 runs, including two fifties, in seven innings at an average of 33.00.

Budhayer doesn't like to lose his wicket and prefers to stay unbeaten and carry on till the end, which is evident in his statistics during the 2011 ACC Under-19 Elite Cup where he scored 121 runs at an average of 121. Also, his patient century against New Zealand during the 2012 U-19 World Cup practice match is another innings that showcases Budhayer's talent.

=== Canada ===
In 2016, Budhayer moved to Canada. He then became Head Coach Bloomfield Cricket Academy, a Toronto-based club owned by Former Nepal national team coach Pubudu Dassanayake.

Budhayer then played for teams like MLCC XI, Bloomfield Cricket Club, Nepalese Canadian Cricket Club, Centurions CC etc. in Domestic leagues. He captained MLCC XI team against Nepal, while Nepal national team was touring Canada.
