= Chandra Sawad =

Nepalese cricketer (born 1990)

Personal information
- Born: 26 January 1990 (age 36); Kanchanpur District, Nepal
- Batting: Right-handed
- Bowling: Right-arm medium-fast
- Role: Bowler

International information
- National side: Nepal

Domestic team information
- Years: Team
- 2014–2014: Sagarmatha Legends (NPL)
- 2013–2015: Nepal Army (National League)
- 2015–2015: Pentagon (SPA Cup)

Career statistics
| Competition | Twenty20 |
|---|---|
| Matches | 9 |
| Runs scored | 2 |
| Batting average | 1.00 |
| 100s/50s | 0/0 |
| Top score | 2 |
| Balls bowled | 174 |
| Wickets | 11 |
| Bowling average | 19.18 |
| 5 wickets in innings | 0 |
| 10 wickets in match | 0 |
| Best bowling | 4/24 |
| Catches/stumpings | 2/- |
- Source: CricketArchive, 9 March 2015

Chandra Sawad (Nepali: चन्द्र सावद; born 26 January 1990) is a Nepalese cricketer. Sawad is a right-handed batsman and a right-arm medium-fast bowler. He made his debut for Nepal against Hong Kong in March 2012.

He represents the Sagarmatha Legends of the Nepal Premier League, Nepal Army Club of the National League and Pentagon International College, which plays in the SPA Cup.

== Playing career ==
Sawad was selected in Nepal Under-19s fourteen-man squad in the 2008 Under-19 World Cup, though he didn't feature in any of Nepal's Youth One Day International matches in the tournament. He was later selected as part of Nepal's fourteen-man squad for the 2012 World Twenty20 Qualifier in the United Arab Emirates, making his Twenty20 debut during the tournament against Hong Kong. He made eight further appearances during the tournament, with his final appearance coming against Papua New Guinea. He took 11 wickets in the tournament, at an average of 19.18, with best figures of 4/24. Nepal failed to qualify for the 2012 World Twenty20 as it finished the tournament in seventh place. In August 2012, he was selected in Nepal's fourteen-man squad for the World Cricket League Division Four in Malaysia, but was not picked in the playing eleven for any of Nepal's matches.
