= Pradeep Airee =

Nepalese cricketer (born 1992)

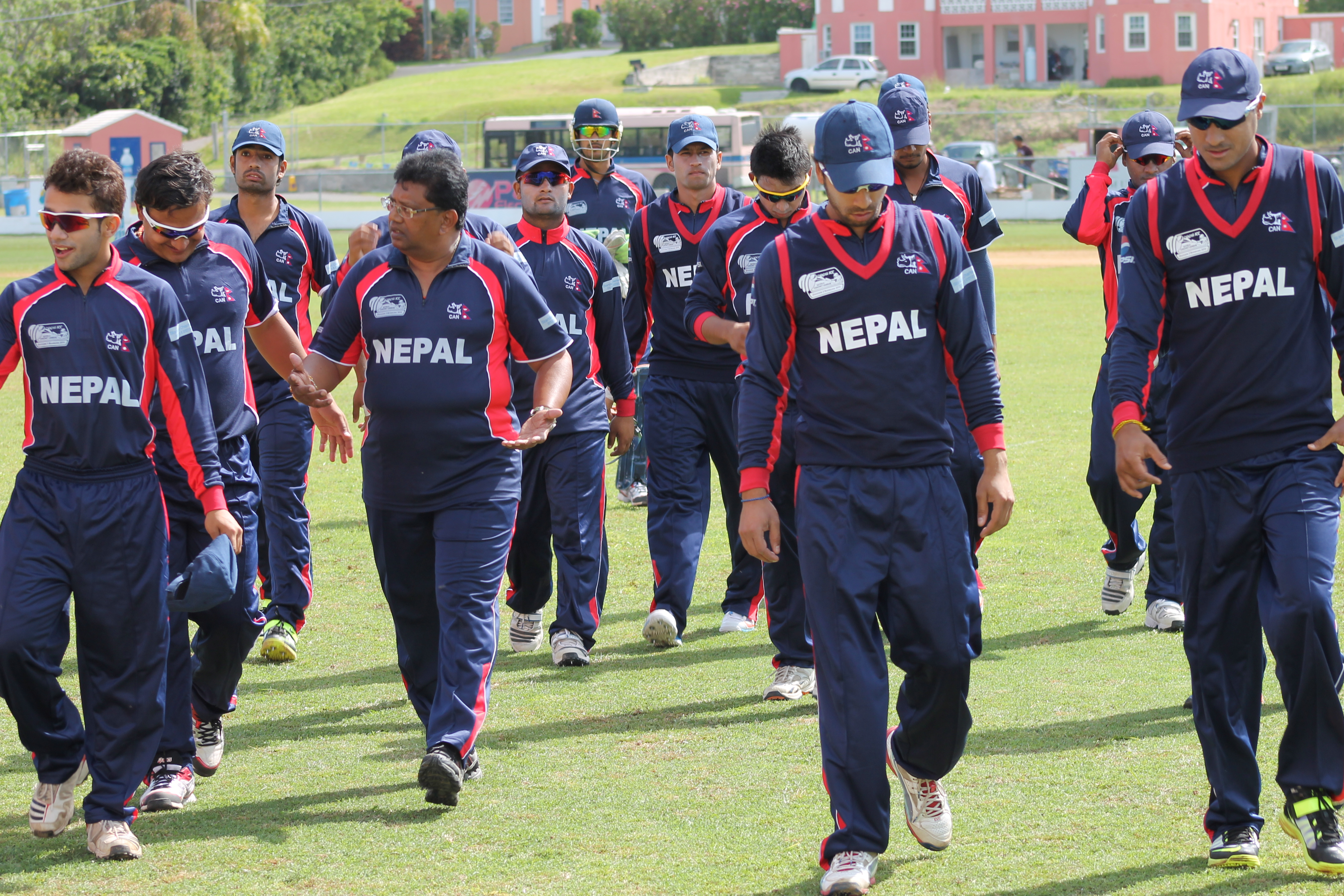

Personal information
- Full name: Pradeep Singh Airee
- Born: 1 September 1992 (age 34); Baitadi, Nepal
- Nickname: Boom Boom Airee
- Height: 5 ft 8 in (1.73 m)
- Batting: Right-handed
- Bowling: Right-arm medium
- Role: Batsman and occasional Wicket-keeper

International information
- National side: Nepal
- T20I debut (cap 14): 30 June 2015 v Netherlands
- Last T20I: 11 February 2022 v Oman
- T20I shirt no.: 24

Domestic team information
- Years: Team
- 2011–2015: APF
- 2014–2014: Kantipur Gurkhas
- 2015: Sudur Pashchimanchal Academy
- 2017–: Bhairawa Gladiators
- 2018–: Rupendehi Challengers

Career statistics
Competition	T20I	LA	T20
Matches	11	6	31
Runs scored	87	89	288
Batting average	7.90	17.80	12.00
100s/50s	0/0	0/0	0/1
Top score	29	26	65*
Balls bowled	–	60	–
Wickets	–	0	–
Bowling average	–	–	–
5 wickets in innings	–	–	–
10 wickets in match	–	–	–
Best bowling	–	–	–
Catches/stumpings	5/1	2/–	8/1
- Source: ESPNCricinfo, 11 February 2022

Pradeep Singh Airee (Nepali: प्रदिप सिंह ऐरी) (born 1 September 1992) is a Nepalese cricketer. Airee is a right-handed batsman and an occasional wicket-keeper, who bowls right-arm medium pace. He made his debut for Nepal against Argentina in August 2010.

He represents the APF Club of the National League, Kantipur Gurkhas of the Nepal Premier League and Sudur Pashchimanchal Academy, which plays in the SPA Cup.

== Playing career ==
Airee was selected in Nepal's fourteen-man squad for the 2010 World Cricket League Division Four, during which he made his debut against Argentina. He made three further appearances in the competition, against the United States, the Cayman Islands and Tanzania. He later played for the Nepal Under-19s in the 2011 Under-19 World Cup Qualifier, making nine appearances during the qualifier, in which the Nepal Under-19s gained qualification to the 2012 Under-19 World Cup.

Further appearances for Nepal followed in the 2011 ACC Twenty20 Cup, before Airee was selected as part of Nepal's fourteen-man squad for the 2012 World Twenty20 Qualifier in the United Arab Emirates, making his Twenty20 debut during the tournament against Hong Kong. He made eight further appearances during the tournament, with his final appearance coming against Papua New Guinea. He scored 165 runs at an average of 20.62 in his nine matches, with a high score of 65 not out. This was his only half century score in the tournament and came against Denmark. Nepal finished the tournament in the seventh place, failing to qualify for the 2012 World Twenty20.

Later in 2012, he was selected as part of the Nepal Under-19 squad for the Under-19 World Cup in Australia, making six Youth One Day International appearances during the tournament. In August 2012, he was selected in Nepal's fourteen man-squad for the World Cricket League Division Four in Malaysia.

He made his Twenty20 International debut against the Netherlands on 30 June 2015.

In October 2018, he was named in Nepal's squad in the Eastern sub-region group for the 2018–19 ICC World Twenty20 Asia Qualifier tournament. He was the leading run-scorer for Nepal in the tournament, with 79 runs in three matches. In June 2019, he was named in Nepal's squad for the Regional Finals of the 2018–19 ICC T20 World Cup Asia Qualifier tournament. In September 2020, he was one of eighteen cricketers to be awarded with a central contract by the Cricket Association of Nepal.
