= Anil Mandal =

Nepalese cricketer (born 1991)

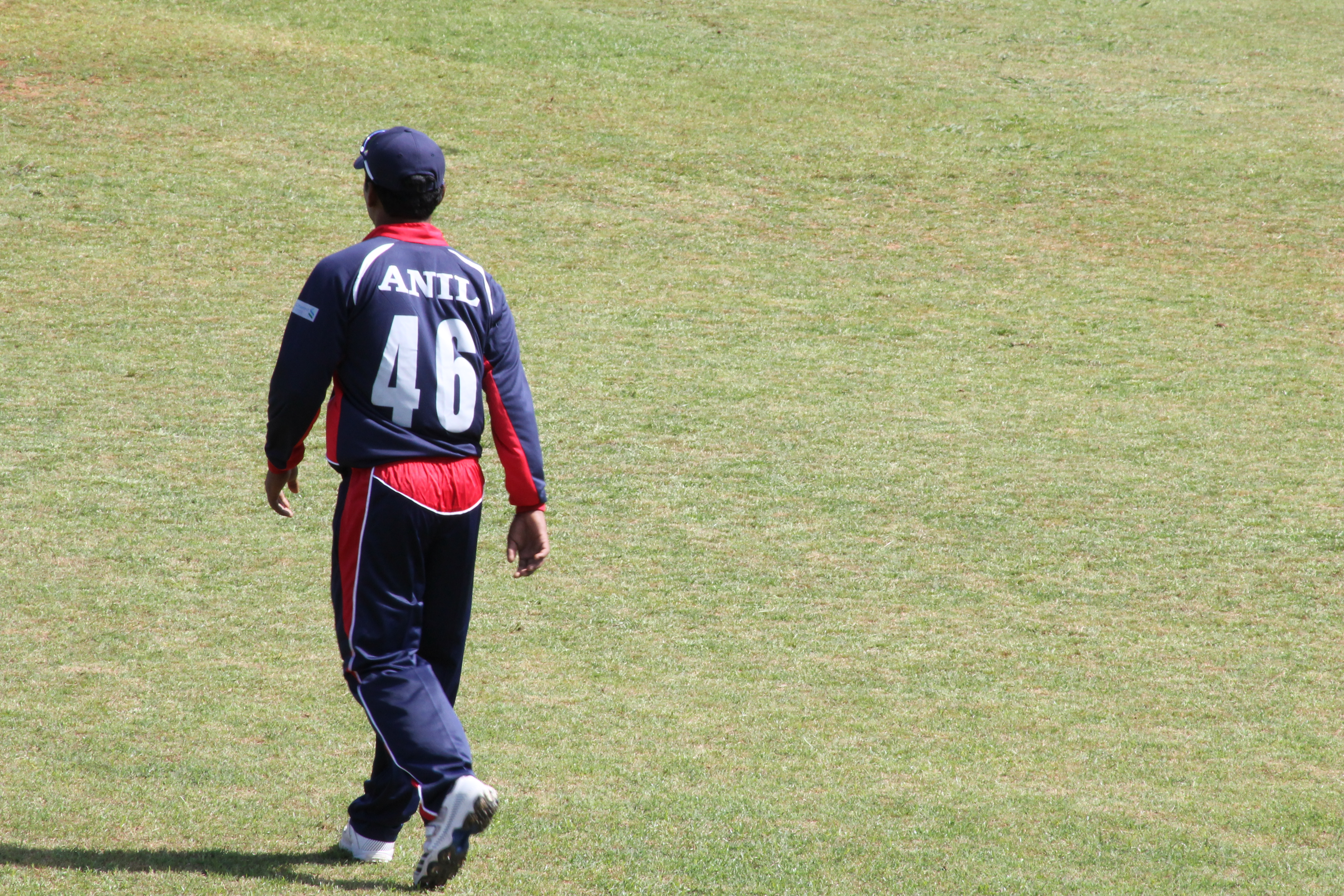

Personal information
- Full name: Anil Kumar Mandal
- Born: 5 February 1991 (age 35); Janakpur, Nepal
- Batting: Right-handed
- Role: Opening Batsman

International information
- National side: Nepal (2015–)
- T20I debut (cap 17): 3 July 2015 v Netherlands
- Last T20I: 13 July 2015 v Ireland
- T20I shirt no.: 46

Domestic team information
- Years: Team
- 2013–2015: Nepal Army
- 2014–2014: Sagarmatha Legends
- 2015: Pentagon

Career statistics
Competition	T20I	LA	T20
Matches	2	10	13
Runs scored	11	154	185
Batting average	5.50	15.40	18.50
100s/50s	0/0	1/0	0/1
Top score	9	100	50
Catches/stumpings	1/–	3/–	4/–
- Source: CricketArchive, 29 September 2021

Anil Kumar Mandal (Nepali: अनिल कुमार मन्डल) (born 5 February 1991) is a Nepalese cricketer. Mandal is a right-handed opening batsman. He made his debut for Nepal against USA in February 2010.

Anil Mandal became the fifth Nepalese cricketer to score an international century, when he slammed 113 off 134 balls against Denmark during the 2012 ICC World Cricket League Division Four in September 2012. He is the only Nepalese player to score two centuries for Nepal in international cricket. He achieved this feat after scoring a century in the 2015–17 ICC World Cricket League Championship's match against Scotland on 29 July 2015.

He represents the Nepal Army Club of the National League, Sagarmatha Legends of the Nepal Premier League and Pentagon International College, which plays in the SPA Cup.

== Playing career ==
Mandal was selected in Nepal Under-19s fourteen man squad in the 2008 Under-19 World Cup, making six Youth One Day International appearances in the tournament. In 2010, Mandal was selected in Nepal's fourteen man squad for the 2010 World Cricket League Division Five in February 2010, making his senior debut in the tournament in a controversial match against the United States. Both teams would progress to the final of the tournament, where Mandal made his second appearance of the tournament. In April of that year, he played for Nepal in the 2010 ACC Trophy Elite, making six appearances. Having gained promotion in the World Cricket League by winning Division Five earlier in 2010, Nepal played in the Division Four in August of that year, with Mandal selected as part of Nepal's fourteen man squad for the tournament, where he made seven appearances. In November 2010, he played for Nepal in the 2010 Asian Games, making three appearances against Hong Kong, the Maldives and Sri Lanka, though Nepal didn't progress far enough in the tournament for Mandal to become a medalist.

Just over a year later, in December 2011, Mandal played for Nepal in the 2011 ACC Twenty20 Cup, making five appearances. Nepal finished the tournament in fourth place and therefore qualified for the 2012 World Twenty20 Qualifier in the United Arab Emirates. In February 2012, he was selected as part of Nepal's fourteen man squad for the World Twenty20 Qualifier, making his Twenty20 debut during the tournament against Afghanistan. He made five further appearances during the tournament, with his final appearance coming against Papua New Guinea. He scored 124 runs at an average of 20.66 in his six matches, with a high score of 50. This was his only half century score in the tournament and came against Afghanistan. Nepal finished the tournament in seventh place, therefore failing to qualify for the 2012 World Twenty20.

In August 2012, he was selected in Nepal's fourteen man squad for the World Cricket League Division Four in Malaysia. He made six appearances in the tournament, scoring 186 runs at an average of 37.20, with a high score of 113 made against Denmark. Nepal won the tournament, in doing so they qualified for the 2013 World Cricket League Division Three.

In the 2015 National One Day Cricket Tournament, he scored 429 runs in 7 innings at an average of 61.29, with one fifty and three centuries. He was awarded the Best Batsman award as his side, Nepal Army Club, won the title.

He made his Twenty20 International debut for Nepal against the Netherlands on 3 July 2015.

He scored 100 off 93 balls in the 2015–17 ICC World Cricket League Championship's match against Scotland, which is the highest score by a Nepalese batsman in the List A format.
