= Vishal Warriors =

- विशाल वारियर्स
- Nickname: VW
- League: Everest Premier League

Personnel
- Captain: Paras Khadka
- Coach: Mahesh Rizal
- Owner: Vishal Group
- Manager: Raunaq B. Malla

Team information
- Colours: Blue
- Founded: 2014

History
- EPL wins: 0
- Notable players: Paras Khadka; Sagar Pun; Manjeet Shrestha

Vishal Warriors, also known as Vishal Group Warriors (Nepali: विशाल वारियर्स), was one of the franchise cricket teams of the first edition of the Everest Premier League. It was captained by Paras Khadka and coached by Mahesh Rizal.

== Squad ==
- Paras Khadka (c)
- Sagar Pun
- Manjeet Shrestha
- Raju Rijal
- Suraj Kurmi
- Ramnaresh Giri
- Yagyaman Kumal
- Deepesh Khatri
- Prakash KC
- Bhivatsu Thapa
- Adeel Khan
- Nurdhos Singh
- Irshad Ahmed
- Susan Bhari
