= Jagdamba Giants =

Jagdamba Rhinos
- जगदम्वा राइनो
- Nickname: JR
- League: Everest Premier League

Personnel
- Captain: Shakti Gauchan
- Coach: Navin Singh
- Owner: Shanker Group

Team information
- Colours: Orange
- Founded: 2014; 12 years ago

History
- EPL wins: 0
- Notable players: Shakti Gauchan; Naresh Budhayer; Mahesh Chhetri; Sompal Kami

Jagdamba Rhinos (Nepali: जगदम्वा राइनो) was a professional cricket team that played in the Everest Premier League. Shakti Gauchan, former captain of Nepal national cricket team, was the captain of the team, whereas Navin Singh is the head coach.

They also were the runners-up of the One Day tournament in the 2014 NPL.

== Players ==
- Shakti Gauchan (c)
- Mahesh Chhetri
- Naresh Budhayer
- Sompal Kami
- Nizamudeen Ansari
- Haseem Ansari
- Subendu Pandey
- Amit Dahal
- Ajay Rajbansi
- Pawan Shrestha
- Santosh Koirala
- Sandeep Sapkota
