= Sagarmatha Legends =

- सगरमाथा लेजेन्ड्स
- Nickname: SL
- League: Everest Premier League

Personnel
- Captain: Binod Bhandari
- Coach: Jagat Tamata
- Owner: Ghorahi Cement Industry

Team information
- Colours: Yellow
- Founded: 2014
- Home ground: Dang International Cricket Stadium
- Capacity: 30,000+ (under construction)

History
- NPL wins: 0
- Notable players: Binod Bhandari; Mehboob Alam; Paresh Lohani; Anil Mandal; Chandra Sawad

Sagarmatha Legends (Nepali: सगरमाथा लेजेन्ड्स) was one of the teams of the Everest Premier League. It was captained by Binod Bhandari.

== Players ==
- Binod Bhandari (c)
- Anil Mandal
- Chandra Sawad
- Mehboob Alam
- Paresh Lohani
- Lokendra Chand
- Rupesh Shrivastav
- Nischal Pandey
- Anupam Singh
- Nabin
- Dilip Nath
- Rupesh Bastola
- Sunil Dhamala
