= Colors X-Factors =

Nepali cricket team

- कलर्स एक्स-फ्याक्टर्स
- Nickname: CXF
- League: Everest Premier League

Personnel
- Captain: Gyanendra Malla
- Coach: Manzoor Alam
- Owner: Teletalk Private Limited
- Manager: Nischal Tiwari

Team information
- Colours: Orange
- Founded: 2014

History
- NPL wins: 0
- Notable players: Gyanendra Malla; Avinash Karn; Rajesh Pulami; Sanjam Regmi

The Colors X-Factors (Nepali: कलर्स एक्स-फ्याक्टर्स) was a professional cricket team that played in the Everest Premier League. Gyanendra Malla, then vice captain of Nepal national cricket team, was the captain of the team, whereas Manzoor Alam was the head coach. The team was owned by the Teletalk Private Limited.
