= ACC Fast Track Countries Tournament =

- Administrator: Asian Cricket Council
- Format: Three-day
- First edition: 2004
- Latest edition: 2006
- Tournament format: Round-robin
- Number of teams: 5
- Current champion: Nepal
- Qualification: ICC Intercontinental Cup

The ACC Fast Track Countries Tournament was a three-day cricket tournament run by the Asian Cricket Council (ACC), contested between its top-ranking ICC associate members. It was played three times between 2004 and 2006, and then replaced by the ACC Twenty20 Cup. Some matches in the second edition of the tournament held first-class status, as they were simultaneously ICC Intercontinental Cup matches.

== 2004/05 tournament ==
Team	Pts	Pld	W	L	D
Hong Kong	95.5	3	3	0	0
United Arab Emirates	91.5	3	3	0	0
Nepal	51.5	4	0	2	2
Singapore	47	4	0	2	2
Malaysia	42.5	4	0	2	2

Hong Kong, the UAE and Nepal all qualified for the 2005 ICC Intercontinental Cup as a result of their top three finish in the tournament. A separate final was originally set to be held, but as Hong Kong and the UAE topped the group with only their group match to take place, it was decided to make the final group match the overall tournament final. The UAE beat Hong Kong by five wickets in that final.

== 2005/06 tournament ==
Team	Pts	Pld	W	L	D
United Arab Emirates	100	4	3	1	0
Nepal	87.5	4	2	2	0
Malaysia	79	4	2	1	1
Singapore	65.5	4	1	2	1
Hong Kong	46	4	0	3	1

Matches in this tournament between Hong Kong, Nepal and the UAE also counted towards the 2005 ICC Intercontinental Cup.

== 2006/07 tournament ==
Team	Pts	Pld	W	L	D	NR
Nepal	95.5	4	2	1	1	0
United Arab Emirates	85.5	4	2	0	1	1
Singapore	69	4	1	2	1	1
Malaysia	68	4	1	2	1	0
Hong Kong	60	4	0	2	2	0

== See also ==
- ACC Premier League
- ACC Championship
- ACC Trophy
- ACC Twenty20 Cup
