= National League Cricket (Nepal) =

National League Cricket in Nepal

- Countries: Nepal
- Administrator: Cricket Association of Nepal
- Format: One-day, Two-day, Twenty20
- First edition: 2002
- Latest edition: 2015
- Tournament format: Round-robin and Knockout
- Number of teams: 11
- Current champion: Nepal Army
- Most successful: Biratnagar (4 titles)
- TV: Kantipur Gold

National League Cricket was an annual cricket tournament held in Nepal. It was administered by the Cricket Association of Nepal.

== History ==
The first organized league cricket in Nepal was held in 2002 as Birendra Memorial National League Cricket. Due to heavy rain, the final game set on 18 May between Biratnagar and Bhairahawa had to be cancelled and winners were declared on the basis of net run rate achieved before the final match. Biratnagar won the trophy with a run rate of +1.33 compared to +1.023 of Bhairahawa. The initial tournament was sponsored by Carlsberg.

In 2007, CAN signed sponsorship deals with Surya Nepal’s Shikhar Filter Kings, John Players and Standard Chartered Bank as the major sponsors of the revised national league and the national team for 5 years worth रु 20 Lakhs.

In 2008, the league was sponsored by Surya Nepal under the name of Springwood One Day National League held from March 28 to April 7. The event had all teams competing in round-robin league rather than in groups of three as used in past. In 2009, the league was sponsored by Pepsi and Standard Chartered Bank and the tournaments were held under the name Pepsi Standard Chartered National One Day and Twenty20 Cricket Tournament for the next five years. From the year 2011, two new departmental teams, the APF cricket team and Nepal Police cricket team joined the league. APF won the league in their first attempt. Nepal Police lost to APF in the one-day tournament but they won the Twenty20 tournament by defeating APF. Nepal Army cricket team joined the league in 2013. They also won the Twenty20 tournament in their first attempt. Nepal Police participated in the league only in 2011.

The 2015 edition of the tournament was solely sponsored by CAN itself as previous sponsors, Pepsi and Standard Chartered Bank's agreement ran out earlier that year.

== Teams ==
- Region-I (Biratnagar)
- Region-II (Birgunj)
- Region-III (Kathmandu)
- Region-IV (Bhairahawa)
- Region-V (Nepalgunj)
- Region-VI (Baitadi)
- Region-VII (Janakpur)
- Region-VIII (Pokhara)
- Region-IX (Dhangadhi)
- Armed Police Force Club
- Tribhuwan Army Club
- Nepal Police Club

== Tournament history ==
=== Senior Men's One Day ===
Tournament Year	Final Venue	Final		
Tournament Year	Final Venue	Winner	Result	Runner-up
2002	N/A	Biratnagar +1.33	Biratnagar won by superior net run rate Report	Bhairahawa +1.023
2003	N/A	Biratnagar	Biratnagar won by 4 runs	Kathmandu
2004	N/A	Biratnagar	Biratnagar won because Bhairahawa walked out due to foggy condition Report	Bhairahawa
2005	TU Cricket Ground; Kirtipur	Biratnagar; 163/9 (34.2 overs)	Biratnagar won by 1 wicket	Kathmandu; 162/8 (35.0 overs)
2006	N/A	Birgunj	Birgunj won Report, Report, Report	Bhairahawa
2007	TU Cricket Ground; Kirtipur	Bhairahawa; 212/8 (50.0 overs)	Bhairahawa won by 94 runs Match Report	Kathmandu; 118 (40.0 overs)
2008	TU Cricket Ground; Kirtipur	Kathmandu; 199 (49.3 overs)	Kathmandu won by 1 run (D/L method); Match Report	Bhairahawa; 167/9 (36.0 overs)
2009	N/A	Kathmandu	Kathmandu won Report, Report	
2010	TU Cricket Ground; Kirtipur	Kathmandu; 149/4 (36.5 overs)	Kathmandu won by 6 wickets Match Report	Biratnagar; 148 (39.0 overs)
2011	TU Cricket Ground; Kirtipur	APF Club; 217/2 (42.2 overs)	APF won by 8 wickets Match Report	Nepal Police Club; 216 (49.5 overs)
2012	TU Cricket Ground; Kirtipur	APF Club; 222/4	APF won by 6 wickets Match Report	Bhairahawa; 221
2014	TU Cricket Ground; Kirtipur	Birgunj; 214/7 (48.5 overs)	Birgunj won by 3 wickets Scorecard, Match Report	APF Club; 213 (46.1 overs)
2015	TU Cricket Ground; Kirtipur	Nepal Army Club; 169/5 (40.5 overs)	Nepal Army won by 5 wickets Scorecard, Match Report	APF Club; 164/9 (45.0 overs)

=== Senior Men's Twenty20 ===
Tournament Year	Final Venue	Final		
Tournament Year	Final Venue	Winner	Result	Runner-up
2009	TU Cricket Ground; Kirtipur	Kathmandu; 94 (19.3 overs)	Kathmandu won by 3 runs Match Report	Bhairahawa; 91 (19.5 overs)
2010	Pulchowk Engineering Campus Ground; Lalitpur	Biratnagar; 104 (20.0 overs)	Biratnagar won by 8 runs Match Report	Bhairahawa; 96/7 (20.0 overs)
2011	TU Cricket Ground; Kirtipur	Nepal Police Club; 85 (19.3 overs)	Nepal Police won by 4 wickets Match Report	APF Club; 86/6 (19.5 overs)
2012	TU Cricket Ground; Kirtipur	APF Club; 167/5 (20.0 overs)	APF won by 95 runs Scorecard, Match Report	Baitadi; 72 (14.4 overs)
2013	TU Cricket Ground; Kirtipur	Nepal Army Club; 113/5 (15.2 overs)	Nepal Army won by 5 wickets Match Report	APF Club; 112/7 (16.0 overs)

== Controversies ==
In May 2010, 18 members of the national cricket team held a press conference and said they will not play the national league because of the behavior of Cricket Association of Nepal (CAN). However, they said they would continue their closed-camp training for 2010 ICC World Cricket League Division Four.

Players boycotted the national one-day cricket championship for the second time in April 2014 in protest against the leadership of CAN and ignorance of players' needs.

== See also ==
- Nepal Premier League
- Prime Minister One Day Cup
