= List of Nepal Twenty20 International cricket records =

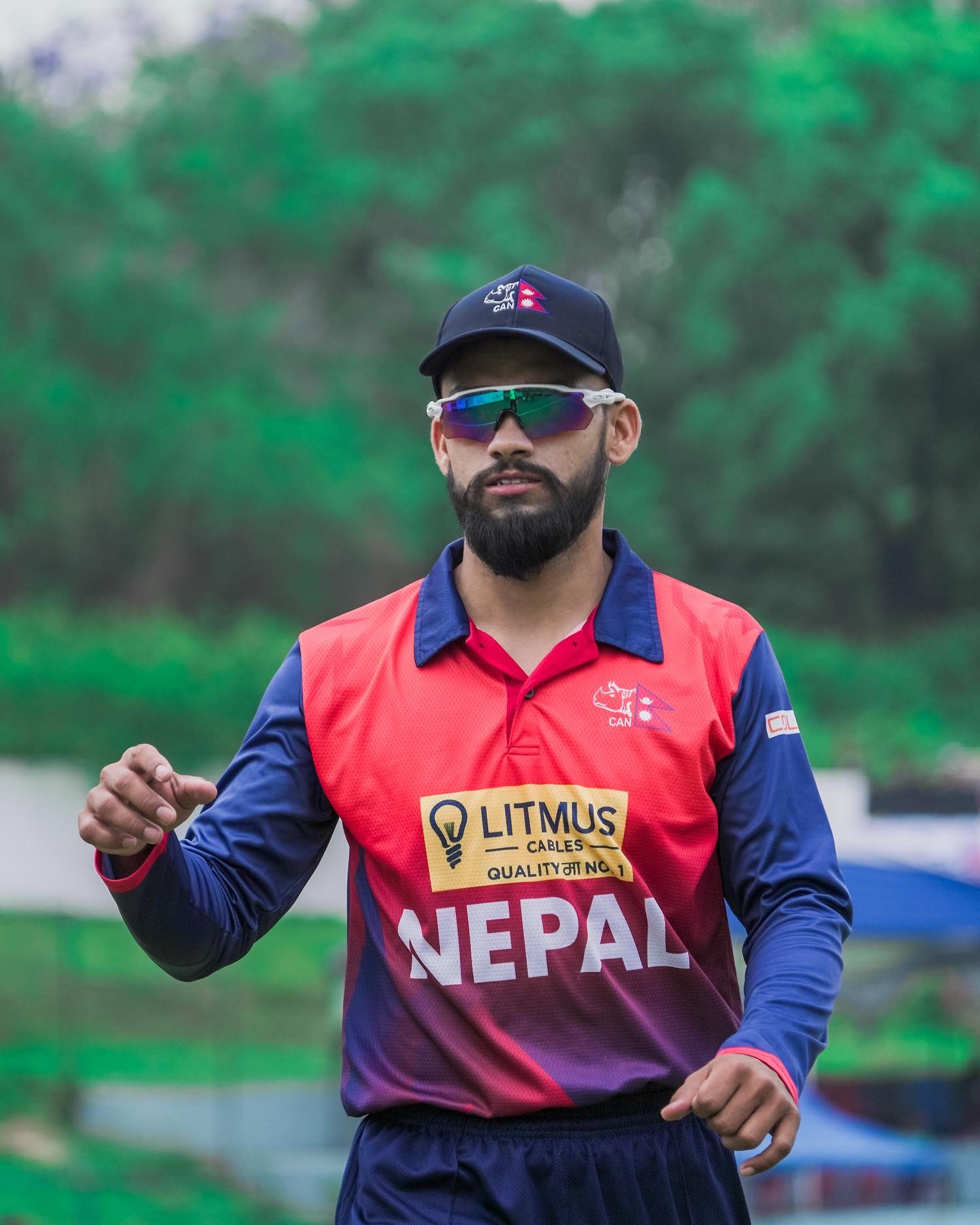
Kushal Bhurtel is the Nepal's all-time highest run-scorer in T20I cricket.

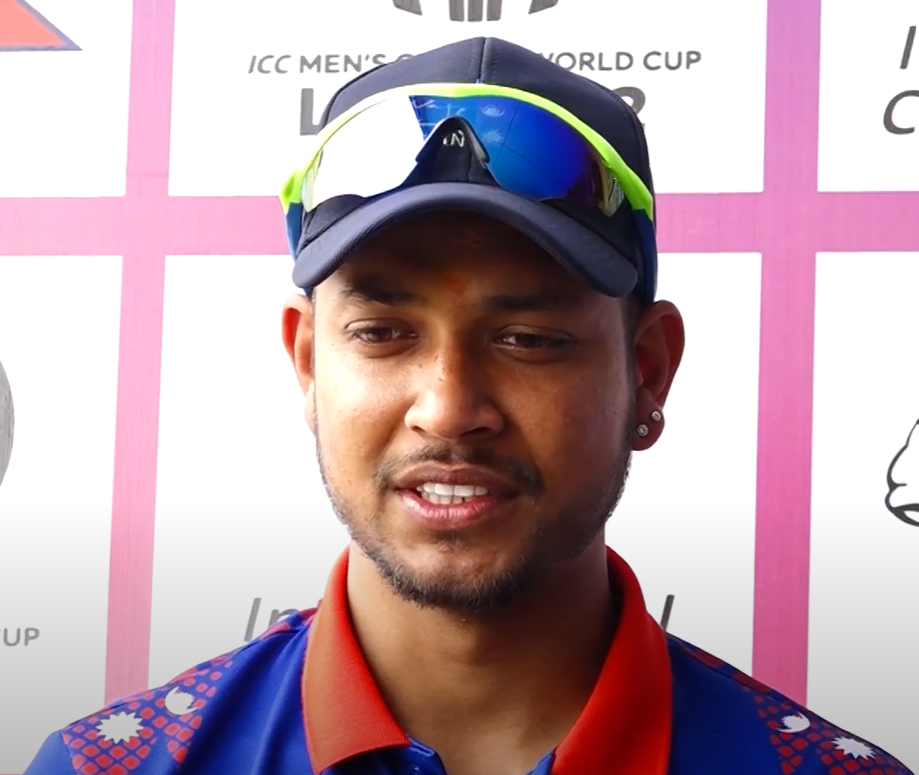
Sandeep Lamichhane is the Nepal's all-time highest wicket-taker in T20I cricket.

Nepal played their first Twenty20 International match against Hong Kong on 16 March 2014, and these records date from that match.

== Listing criteria ==
In general, the top five are listed in each category (except when there is a tie for the last place among the five, in which case, all the tied record holders are noted).

The name of the players who have played at least one match in the last or ongoing series/tournament has been marked in bold.

== Team records ==
=== Matches played (Total) ===
Country	Matches	Won	Lost	Tied	NR	Result %
Nepal	124	72	45	3	4	60.83%
Last Updated: 26 September 2026

=== Head-to-head records ===
Opposition	First match	Matches	Won	Lost	Tied +W	Tied +L	NR	% Won	First win
Vs Test Nations
Afghanistan	20 March 2014	2	2	0	0	0	0	100.00	20 March 2014
Bangladesh	18 March 2014	2	0	2	0	0	0	0.00	
England	8 February 2026	1	0	1	0	0	0	0.00	
India	3 October 2023	1	0	1	0	0	0	0.00	
Ireland	13 July 2015	3	0	3	0	0	0	0.00	
South Africa	14 June 2024	1	0	1	0	0	0	0.00	
West Indies	27 September 2025	4	2	2	0	0	0	50.00	27 September 2025
Zimbabwe	27 September 2019	2	0	2	0	0	0	0.00	
Vs Associate Members
Bhutan	5 December 2019	1	1	0	0	0	0	100.00	5 December 2019
Canada	21 February 2022	3	1	2	0	0	0	33.33	21 February 2022
China	31 May 2026	1	1		0	0	0	100.00	31 May 2026
Hong Kong	16 March 2014	13	6	5	0	0	2	54.54	16 March 2014
Italy	12 February 2026	1	0	1	0	0	0	0.00	
Japan	10 October 2025	2	1	0	0	0	1	100.00	10 October 2025
Kenya	25 August 2022	5	3	2	0	0	0	60.00	25 August 2022
Kuwait	27 July 2019	4	3	1	0	0	0	75.00	27 July 2019
Malaysia	13 July 2019	11	10	1	0	0	0	90.90	13 July 2019
Maldives	6 December 2019	3	3	0	0	0	0	100.00	6 December 2019
Mongolia	27 September 2023	1	1	0	0	0	0	100.00	27 September 2023
Namibia	27 February 2024	2	1	1	0	0	0	50.00	1 March 2024
Netherlands	30 June 2015	15	6	7	0	1	1	46.42	3 July 2015
Oman	10 October 2019	9	6	2	0	1	0	72.22	11 February 2022
Papua New Guinea	17 July 2015	6	4	2	0	0	0	66.66	27 March 2022
Philippines	19 February 2022	1	1	0	0	0	0	100.00	19 February 2022
Qatar	23 July 2019	4	3	1	0	0	0	75.00	13 April 2024
Samoa	17 October 2025	1	1	0	0	0	0	100.00	17 October 2025
Saudi Arabia	17 April 2024	1	1	0	0	0	0	100.00	17 April 2024
Scotland	17 June 2025	3	2	1	0	0	0	66.66	17 June 2025
Singapore	28 July 2019	3	2	1	0	0	0	66.66	28 September 2019
Thailand	2 March 2020	1	1	0	0	0	0	100.00	2 March 2020
United Arab Emirates	31 January 2019	13	7	6	0	0	0	53.84	1 February 2019
United States	17 October 2024	3	2	0	1	0	0	83.33	17 October 2024
Source: ESPNcricinfo Last updated: 26 September 2026

=== First bilateral T20I series wins ===
Opponent	Year of first Home win	Year of first Away win
United Arab Emirates		2018/19
Malaysia		2019
Kenya		2022
United States		2024
West Indies		2025
Last Updated: 29 September 2025

=== Year of first T20I match wins ===
Opponent	Home		Away / Neutral	
Opponent	Venue	Year	Venue	Year
Afghanistan			Chattogram, Bangladesh	2014
Bhutan	Kirtipur, Kathmandu	2019		
Canada			Al Amarat, Oman	2022
China			West Coast, Singapore	2026
Hong Kong	Mulpani, Kathmandu	2023	Chattogram, Bangladesh	2014
Japan			Al Amarat, Oman	2025
Kenya			Nairobi, Kenya	2022
Kuwait			Singapore	2019
Malaysia	Kirtipur, Kathmandu	2021	Kuala Lumpur, Malaysia	2019
Maldives	Kirtipur, Kathmandu	2019	Huangzhou, China	2023
Mongolia			Huangzhou, China	2023
Namibia	Kirtipur, Kathmandu	2024		
Netherlands	Kirtipur, Kathmandu	2021	Rotterdam, Netherlands	2015
Oman			Al Amarat, Oman	2022
Papua New Guinea	Kirtipur, Kathmandu	2022	Mong Kok, Hong Kong	2024
Philippines			Al Amarat, Oman	2022
Qatar			Al Amarat, Oman	2024
Scotland			Glasgow, Scotland	2025
Singapore	Kirtipur, Kathmandu	2023	Singapore	2019
Thailand			Bangkok, Thailand	2020
Samoa			Al Amarat, Oman	2025
United Arab Emirates	Mulpani, Kathmandu	2023	Dubai, UAE	2019
United States			Dallas, United States	2024
West Indies			Sharjah, United Arab Emirates	2025
Last Updated: 31 May 2026

=== Winning every match in a series ===
In a bilateral series winning all matches is referred to as whitewash. Only series with more than one match are considered. Does not include tri-nation series, or tournament, just bilateral series.

Opposition	Matches	Host	Series	Season	Ref
Malaysia	2	Malaysia	Nepalese cricket team in Malaysia in 2019	2019	
United States	3	United States	United States v Nepal T20I series in 2024	2024–25	
Last updated: 14 February 2024

== Team scoring records ==
=== Highest innings totals ===
The highest score for Nepal is 314/3 scored against Mongolia during the 2022 Asian Games.

Rank	Score	Opposition	Venue	Date
1	314/3 (20 overs)	Mongolia	Zhejiang University of Technology Cricket Field, Huangzhou, China	27 September 2023
2	313/2 (20 overs)	China	Singapore National Cricket Ground, Singapore	31 May 2026
3	275/7 (20 overs)	Malaysia	Singapore National Cricket Ground, Singapore	4 June 2026
4	238/3 (20 overs)	Netherlands	Tribhuvan University International Cricket Ground, Kirtipur, Nepal	24 April 2021
5	236/3 (20 overs)	Bhutan	Tribhuvan University International Cricket Ground, Kirtipur, Nepal	5 December 2019
Source: ESPNcricinfo Last updated: 14 June 2026

=== Lowest innings totals ===
Rank	Score	Opposition	Venue	Date
1	53 (14.3 overs)	Ireland	Stormont (cricket ground), Belfast, Ireland	13 July 2015
2	64 (11.0 overs)	Oman	Al Amerat Cricket Stadium, Muscat, Oman	10 October 2019
3	69 (17.4 overs)	Netherlands	VRA Cricket Ground, Amstelveen, The Netherlands	1 July 2015
4	72 (20.0 overs)	Hong Kong	Paikiasothy Saravanamuttu Stadium, Colombo, Sri Lanka	24 November 2014
5	85 (19.2 overs)	Bangladesh	Kensington Oval, Bridgetown, Barbados	16 June 2024
5	85 (16.3 overs)	Papua New Guinea	Mission Road Ground, Mong Kok, Hong Kong	13 March 2024
Source: ESPNcricinfo Last updated: 16 June 2024

=== Highest totals conceded ===
Rank	Score	Opposition	Venue	Date
1	212/6	Hong Kong	Mission Road Ground, Mong Kok, Hong Kong	9 March 2024
2	209/7	Netherlands	Tribhuvan University International Cricket Ground, Kirtipur, Nepal	20 April 2021
3	206/4	Namibia	Tribhuvan University International Cricket Ground, Kirtipur, Nepal	27 February 2024
4	202/4	India	Zhejiang University of Technology Cricket Field, Huangzhou, China	3 October 2023
5	193/5	Scotland	Titwood, Glasgow, Scotland	20 June 2025
Last Updated: 20 June 2025 Source:

=== Lowest totals conceded ===
Rank	Score	Opposition	Venue	Date
1	41	Mongolia	Zhejiang University of Technology Cricket Field, Huangzhou, China	27 September 2023
2	66	Thailand	Terdthai Cricket Ground, Bangkok, Thailand	4 March 2020
3	69	Hong Kong	Zohur Ahmed Chowdhury Stadium, Chattogram, Bangladesh	16 March 2014
4	74	Maldives	Zhejiang University of Technology Cricket Field, Huangzhou, China	1 October 2023
5	78	Oman	Oman Cricket Academy Ground, Al Amarat	18 February 2022
Last Updated: 27 September 2023 Source: Qualification: The opposition score with team getting all out. Does not include record where the opposition completes the target.

=== Highest match aggregate ===
Rank	Score	Opposition	Venue	Date
1	415/13 (39.3 Overs)	Netherlands	Tribhuvan University Cricket Ground, Kirtipur, Nepal	20 April 2021
2	405/12 (39.2 Overs)	China	Singapore National Cricket Ground, Singapore	31 May 2026
3	392/14 (38.5 Overs)	Namibia	Tribhuvan University Cricket Ground, Kirtipur, Nepal	27 February 2024
4	388/16 (40 Overs)	Qatar	Oman Cricket Academy Ground, Al Amarat, Oman	13 April 2024
5	381/13 (40.0 Overs)	India	Zhejiang University of Technology Cricket Field, Huangzhou, China	3 October 2023
Source: ESPNcricinfo. Last updated: 31 May 2026

=== Lowest match aggregate ===
Rank	Score	Opposition	Venue	Date
1	107/12 (22.3 overs	Ireland	Civil Service Cricket Club Ground, Belfast, Ireland	13 July 2015
2	129/14 (22.5 overs)	Oman	Oman Cricket Academy Ground, Al Amarat, Oman	10 October 2019
3	138/11 (25.3 overs)	Thailand	Terdthai Cricket Ground, Bangkok, Thailand	4 March 2020
4	145/18 (39.5 overs)	Hong Kong	Paikiasothy Saravanamuttu Stadium, Colombo, Sri Lanka	24 November 2014
5	148/11 (15.2 overs)	Saudi Arabia	Oman Cricket Academy Ground, Al Amarat, Oman	17 April 2024
Source: Cricinfo. Last updated: 17 April 2024

=== Highest win margins (by wickets) ===
Rank	Margin	Target	Opposition	Venue	Date
1	9 wickets	152	Singapore	Indian Association Ground, Singapore	28 September 2019
1	9 wickets	67	Thailand	Terdthai Cricket Ground, Bangkok, Thailand	4 March 2020
1	9 wickets	137	Netherlands	Tribhuvan University International Cricket Ground, Kirtipur, Nepal	17 April 2021
1	9 wickets	110	Malaysia	Tribhuvan University International Cricket Ground, Kirtipur, Nepal	19 April 2021
1	9 wickets	88	Oman	Oman Cricket Academy Ground, Al Amarat, Oman	24 February 2022
Ranked in chronicle order. Source: ESPNcricinfo Last updated: 24 February 2022

=== Highest win margins (by runs) ===
Rank	Margin	Target	Opposition	Venue	Date
1	273 runs	315	Mongolia	Zhejiang University of Technology Cricket Field, Hangzhou, China	27 September 2023
2	221 runs	314	China	Singapore National Cricket Ground, West Coast	31 May 2026
3	142 runs	239	Netherlands	Tribhuvan University International Cricket Ground, Kirtipur, Nepal	24 April 2021
4	141 runs	237	Bhutan	Tribhuvan University International Cricket Ground, Kirtipur, Nepal	5 December 2019
5	138 runs	224	Maldives	Zhejiang University of Technology Cricket Field, Huangzhou, China	1 October 2023
Source: ESPNcricinfo Last updated: 31 May 2026

=== Highest win margin (by balls remaining) ===
Rank	Margin	Target	Opposition	Venue	Date
1	87	67	Thailand	Terdthai Cricket Ground, Bangkok, Thailand	4 March 2020
2	47	110	Malaysia	Tribhuvan University International Cricket Ground, Kirtipur, Nepal	19 April 2021
3	38	115	Malaysia	Tribhuvan University International Cricket Ground, Kirtipur, Nepal	30 March 2022
4	37	137	Hong Kong	Mulpani Cricket Stadium, Mulpani, Nepal	19 October 2023
5	35	81	Canada	Oman Cricket Academy Ground, Al Amarat, Oman	21 February 2022
Source: Cricinfo. Last updated: 19 October 2023

=== Lowest win margins (by runs) ===
Rank	Margin	Target	Opposition	Venue	Date
1	1 run	141	United Arab Emirates	Oman Cricket Academy Ground Turf 1, Al Amarat, Oman	12 October 2025
2	3 runs	181	Namibia	Tribhuvan University International Cricket Ground, Kirtipur, Nepal	1 March 2024
3	5 runs	148	Qatar	Oman Cricket Academy Ground Turf 1, Al Amarat, Oman	13 October 2025
4	6 runs	174	Malaysia	Kinrara Academy Oval, Kuala Lumpur, Malaysia	14 July 2019
5	9 runs	142	Afghanistan	Zohur Ahmed Chowdhury Stadium, Chittagong, Bangladesh	20 March 2014
Source: ESPNcricinfo Last updated: 13 October 2025

=== Lowest win margin (by wickets) ===
Rank	Margin	Opposition	Venue	Date
1	2 wickets	Scotland	Titwood, Glasgow, Scotland	17 June 2025
2	3 wickets	Netherlands	Hazelaarweg Stadion, Rotterdam, Netherlands	3 July 2015
2	4 wickets	United Arab Emirates	ICC Academy, Dubai, United Arab Emirates	1 February 2019
2	4 wickets	Hong Kong	Oman Cricket Academy Ground, Al Amarat, Oman	6 October 2019
2	4 wickets	Netherlands	Oman Cricket Academy Ground, Al Amarat, Oman	7 October 2019
2	4 wickets	Kenya	Gymkhana Club Ground, Nairobi, Kenya	28 August 2022
Source: Cricinfo. Last updated: 28 August 2022

=== Lowest win margin (by balls remaining) ===
Rank	Margin	Target	Opposition	Venue	Date
1	1 Ball	134	Netherlands	Oman Cricket Academy Ground, Muscat, Oman	7 October 2019
1	1 Ball	98	Scotland	Titwood, Glasgow, Scotland	17 June 2025
3	2 Balls	140	Netherlands	Hazelaarweg Stadion, Rotterdam, Netherlands	3 July 2015
3	2 Balls	175	Netherlands	Titwood, Glasgow, Scotland	19 June 2025
5	3 Balls	108	United Arab Emirates	ICC Academy, Dubai, United Arab Emirates	1 February 2019
5	3 Balls	136	Oman	Oman Cricket Academy Ground, Muscat, Oman	11 February 2022
5	3 Balls	157	Kenya	Gymkhana Club Ground, Nairobi, Kenya	28 August 2022
Source: Cricinfo. Last updated: 19 June 2025

=== Highest successful run chases ===
Rank	Target	Score	Opposition	Venue	Date
1	186	186/4	Kuwait	Mission Road Ground, Mong Kok, Hong Kong	10 April 2025
2	175	180/4	Netherlands	Titwood, Glasgow, Scotland	19 June 2025
3	166	166/4	Malaysia	Tribhuvan University International Cricket Ground, Kirtipur, Nepal	31 October 2023
4	165	165/5	United Arab Emirates	Mulpani International Cricket Ground, Mulpani, Nepal	23 October 2023
5	157	160/6	Kenya	Gymkhana Club Ground, Nairobi, Kenya	28 August 2022
5	157	157/2	United States	Grand Prairie Stadium, Dallas, United States	20 October 2024
Last Updated: 19 June 2025 Source:

=== Tied matches ===
A tie can occur when the scores of both teams are equal at the conclusion of play, provided that the side batting last has completed their innings.

Opposition	Venue	Date
Oman	Tribhuvan University International Cricket Ground, Kirtipur, Nepal	5 November 2023
United States	Grand Prairie Stadium, Dallas, United States	19 October 2024
Netherlands	Titwood, Glasgow, Scotland	16 June 2025

== Individual records (Batting) ==
=== Most career runs ===
Rank	Runs	Player	Innings	HS	Career span
1	2,329	**Kushal Bhurtel**	80	129	2021–2026
2	2,235	**Dipendra Singh Airee**	87	110*	2018–2026
3	1,878	**Rohit Paudel**	81	69*	2019–2026
4	1,813	**Aasif Sheikh**	77	69	2021–2026
5	1,144	**Kushal Malla**	59	137*	2019–2026
Source: ESPNcricinfo Last updated: 26 September 2026

=== Fastest runs-getter ===
Runs	Batsman	Matches	Innings	Record Date	Ref
1,000	Dipendra Singh Airee	39	34	4 April 2022	
2,000	Kushal Bhurtel	77	75	31 May 2026	
Last Updated: 31 May 2026

=== Most runs in each batting position ===
Batting position	Batsman	Innings	Runs	Average	Career Span	Ref
Opener	Kushal Bhurtel	73	2,136	31.41	2021-2026	
Number 3	Rohit Paudel	37	831	25.96	2019-2026	
Number 4	Dipendra Singh Airee	39	1,144	36.90	2019–2026	
Number 5	Dipendra Singh Airee	23	588	36.75	2018–2026	
Number 6	Dipendra Singh Airee	12	249	27.66	2023–2026	
Number 7	Gulsan Jha	18	204	15.69	2023–2026	
Number 8	Karan KC	22	235	19.58	2015–2026	
Number 9	Karan KC	12	95	11.87	2015–2026	
Number 10	Nandan Yadav	5	66	33.00	2025-2025	
Number 11	Abinash Bohara	13	19	3.16	2019–2024	
Last Updated: 26 September 2026

=== Most runs against each team ===
Opposition	Runs	Batsman	Innings	Average	Ref
Afghanistan	**56**	Subash Khakurel	1	56.00	
Bangladesh	**41**	Paras Khadka	1	41.00	
Bhutan	**107**	Gyanendra Malla	1	107.00	
Canada	55	**Aasif Sheikh**	3	18.33	
China	129	**Kushal Bhurtel**	1	129.00	
England	44	**Dipendra Singh Airee**	1	44.00	
Hong Kong	**125**	**Kushal Malla**	4	31.25	
India	32	**Dipendra Singh Airee**	1	32.00	
Italy	27	**Aarif Sheikh**	1	27.00	
Ireland	**47**	**Dipendra Singh Airee**	2	23.50	
Japan	**62**	**Sundeep Jora**	2	62.00	
Kenya	156	**Rohit Paudel**	5	31.20	
Kuwait	150	**Kushal Bhurtel**	3	50.00	
Malaysia	230	**Dipendra Singh Airee**	7	46.00	
Maldives	77	**Rohit Paudel**	3	38.50	
Mongolia	137	**Kushal Malla**	1	-	
Namibia	87	**Kushal Malla**	2	87.00	
Netherlands	339	**Kushal Bhurtel**	9	37.66	
Oman	**217**	**Kushal Bhurtel**	7	36.16	
Papua New Guinea	**126**	**Kushal Bhurtel**	5	25.20	
Philippines	**104**	**Kushal Bhurtel**	1	-	
Qatar	**124**	**Dipendra Singh Airee**	3	62.00	
Scotland	48	**Dipendra Singh Airee**	2	24.00	
Singapore	**118**	Paras Khadka	2	118.00	
Thailand	**36**	**Kushal Malla**	1	-	
United Arab Emirates	**287**	**Dipendra Singh Airee**	12	41.00	
United States	**142**	**Kushal Bhurtel**	3	142.00	
West Indies	**86**	**Sundeep Jora**	3	28.66	
Zimbabwe	**44**	**Dipendra Singh Airee**	2	22.00	
Zimbabwe	**44**	**Binod Bhandari**	2	44.00	
Last Updated: 26 September 2026

=== Highest individual score ===
Rank	Runs	Player	Opposition	Venue	Date
1	137*	**Kushal Malla**	Mongolia	Zhejiang University of Technology Cricket Field, Huangzhou, China	27 September 2023
2	129	**Kushal Bhurtel**	China	Singapore National Cricket Ground, West Coast, Singapore	31 May 2026
5	126	**Kushal Bhurtel**	Malaysia	Singapore National Cricket Ground, West Coast, Singapore	4 June 2026
4	110*	**Dipendra Singh Airee**	Malaysia	Tribhuvan University International Cricket Ground, Kirtipur, Nepal	2 April 2022
5	107	Gyanendra Malla	Bhutan	Tribhuvan University International Cricket Ground, Kirtipur, Nepal	5 December 2019
Source: ESPNcricinfo; Last updated: 4 June 2026

=== Highest score against each team ===
Opposition	Score	Batsman	Venue	Date
Afghanistan	56	Subash Khakurel	Chattogram	20 March 2014
Bangladesh	41	Paras Khadka	Chattogram	18 March 2014
Bhutan	107	Gyanendra Malla	Kirtipur	5 December 2019
Canada	34*	**Kushal Bhurtel**	Al Amarat	21 February 2022
China	129	**Kushal Bhurtel**	West Coast	31 May 2026
England	44	**Dipendra Singh Airee**	Mumbai	8 February 2026
Hong Kong	92	**Kushal Malla**	Mulpani	21 October 2023
India	32	**Dipendra Singh Airee**	Hangzhou	3 October 2023
Italy	27	**Aarif Sheikh**	Mumbai	12 February 2026
Ireland	28	**Dipendra Singh Airee**	Al Amarat	14 February 2022
Japan	57*	**Sundeep Jora**	Nisshin	26 September 2026
Kenya	59	Gyanendra Malla	Nairobi	30 August 2022
Kuwait	81	**Kushal Bhurtel**	Mong Kok	10 April 2025
Malaysia	110*	**Dipendra Singh Airee**	Kirtipur	2 April 2022
Maldives	52	**Rohit Paudel**	Hangzhou	1 October 2023
Mongolia	137*	**Kushal Malla**	Hangzhou	27 September 2023
Namibia	55*	**Kushal Malla**	Kirtipur	1 March 2024
Netherlands	77	**Kushal Bhurtel**	Kirtipur	24 April 2021
Oman	73*	**Dipendra Singh Airee**	Al Amarat	11 February 2022
Papua New Guinea	66	**Dipendra Singh Airee**	Kirtipur	31 March 2022
Philippines	104*	**Kushal Bhurtel**	Al Amarat	19 February 2022
Qatar	34	**Dipendra Singh Airee**	Singapore	23 July 2019
Scotland	43*	Rupesh Singh	Glasgow	20 June 2025
Singapore	106*	Paras Khadka	Singapore	28 September 2019
Thailand	36*	**Kushal Malla**	Bangkok	4 March 2020
United Arab Emirates	64*	**Aasif Sheikh**	Mulpani	3 November 2023
West Indies	68*	**Aasif Sheikh**	Sharjah	29 September 2025
Zimbabwe	40	**Dipendra Singh Airee**	Singapore	27 September 2019
Last updated: 26 September 2026; Source:

=== Highest individual score in each batting position ===
Batting position	Batsman	Score	Opposition	Venue	Date	Ref
Opener	**Kushal Bhurtel**	129	China	West Coast	31 May 2026	
Number 3	**Kushal Malla**	137*	Mongolia	Hangzhou	27 September 2023	
Number 4	**Dipendra Singh Airee**	110*	Malaysia	Kirtipur	2 April 2022	
Number 5	**Kushal Malla**	92	Hong Kong	Mulpani	21 October 2023	
Number 6	Basir Ahamad	80	Kuwait	Mong Kok	13 April 2025	
Number 7	**Kushal Malla**	47*	Maldives	Hangzhou	1 October 2023	
Number 8	**Dipendra Singh Airee**	44*	Hong Kong	Al Amerat	20 April 2024	
Number 9	**Sompal Kami**	26	Namibia	Kirtipur	27 February 2024	
Number 10	**Sompal Kami**	40	Hong Kong	Colombo	24 November 2014	
Number 11	**Abinash Bohara**	12	Hong Kong	Bangkok	1 March 2020	
Last Updated: 31 May 2026

=== Highest career average ===
Rank	Average	Player	Runs	Innings	Not out	Career span
1	33.86	**Dipendra Singh Airee**	2,235	87	21	2018–2026
2	31.90	**Kushal Bhurtel**	2,325	79	7	2021–2026
3	29.34	**Rohit Paudel**	1,878	81	17	2019–2026
4	27.55	Paras Khadka	799	32	3	2014–2020
5	24.50	**Aasif Sheikh**	1,813	77	3	2021–2026
Qualification: 20 innings, Source: ESPNcricinfo Last updated: 26 September 2026

=== Highest career strike rate ===
Rank	Strike rate	Player	Innings	Runs	Balls	Career span
1	151.84	**Karan KC**	52	495	326	2015–2026
2	138.99	**Dipendra Singh Airee**	87	2,235	1,608	2018–2026
3	138.55	**Gulsan Jha**	47	672	485	2022–2026
4	137.33	**Kushal Malla**	59	1,144	833	2019–2026
5	136.27	**Kushal Bhurtel**	80	2,329	1,709	2021–2026
Qualification: 250 balls faced, Source: ESPNcricinfo Last updated: 26 September 2026

=== Most 50+ scores ===
Rank	50s	Player	Innings	Period
1	18	**Kushal Bhurtel**	80	2021–2026
2	13	**Dipendra Singh Airee**	87	2018–2026
3	11	**Aasif Sheikh**	77	2019–2026
4	9	**Rohit Paudel**	81	2019–2026
5	6	**Kushal Malla**	59	2019–2026
Source:ESPNcricinfo Last updated: 26 September 2026

=== Most centuries ===
Rank	100s	Batsman	Career span
1	3	**Kushal Bhurtel**	2021–2026
2	1	**Dipendra Singh Airee**	2018–2026
2	1	Paras Khadka	2014-2020
2	1	Gyanendra Malla	2014–2022
2	1	**Kushal Malla**	2019-2026
Source: Cricinfo. Last updated: 4 June 2026

=== Most career sixes ===
Rank	Sixes	Player	Career span
1	111	**Kushal Bhurtel**	2021–2026
2	93	**Dipendra Singh Airee**	2018–2026
3	76	**Kushal Malla**	2019–2026
4	75	**Aasif Sheikh**	2021–2026
5	60	**Rohit Paudel**	2019–2026
Source: ESPNcricinfo Last updated: 26 September 2026

=== Most career fours ===
Rank	Fours	Player	Career span
1	220	**Kushal Bhurtel**	2021–2026
2	164	**Aasif Sheikh**	2021–2026
3	159	**Dipendra Singh Airee**	2018–2026
4	148	**Rohit Paudel**	2019–2026
5	82	Paras Khadka	2014–2020
Source: ESPNcricinfo Last updated: 26 September 2026

=== Highest strike rate in an innings ===
Rank	Strike rate	Player	Runs	Balls	Opposition	Venue	Date
1	520.00	**Dipendra Singh Airee**	52*	10	Mongolia	Zhejiang University of Technology Cricket Field, Hangzhou, China	27 September 2023
2	346.15	**Karan KC**	45	13	Malaysia	Tribhuvan University International Cricket Ground, Kirtipur, Nepal	22 April 2021
3	328.57	**Rohit Paudel**	69*	21	China	Singapore National Cricket Ground, West Coast, Singapore	31 May 2026
4	325.00	**Lokesh Bam**	39*	12	Samoa	Oman Cricket Academy Ground Turf 1, Al Amarat, Oman	17 October 2025
5	304.76	**Dipendra Singh Airee**	64*	21	Qatar	Oman Cricket Academy Ground Turf 1, Al Amarat, Oman	13 April 2024
Source: ESPNcricinfo Last updated: 31 May 2026 - Qualification: Minimum 25 Runs.

=== Most runs in a calendar year ===
Rank	Runs	Player	Innings	NO	Average	HS	Year
1	626	**Dipendra Singh Airee**	17	4	48.15	110*	2022
2	541	Paras Khadka	18	2	33.81	106*	2019
3	531	**Rohit Paudel**	23	3	26.55	56*	2024
4	522	**Kushal Bhurtel**	12	1	47.45	129	2026
5	509	**Kushal Bhurtel**	16	0	31.81	81	2025
Source: ESPNcricinfo Last updated: 26 September 2026

=== Most runs in a series ===
Rank	Runs	Player	Matches	Innings	Series
1	340	**Kushal Bhurtel**	4	4	2026 Asian Games Qualifier
2	278	**Kushal Bhurtel**	5	5	2020–21 Nepal Tri-Nation Series
3	255	**Dipendra Singh Airee**	5	5	2021–22 Nepal T20I Tri-Nation Series
4	213	**Kushal Malla**	3	3	2022 Asian Games
5	207	**Kushal Bhurtel**	6	6	2025 Men's T20 World Cup Asia–EAP Regional Final
Source: ESPNcricinfo Last updated: 8 June 2026

=== Most ducks ===
A duck refers to a batsman being dismissed without scoring a run.

Rank	Ducks	Player	Career span
1	6	**Kushal Bhurtel**	2021–2026
2	5	**Abinash Bohara**	2019–2024
2	5	**Karan KC**	2015–2026
2	5	**Sompal Kami**	2014–2026
5	4	Pradeep Airee	2015–2022
5	4	Pawan Sarraf	2019–2022
5	4	**Kushal Malla**	2019–2026
5	4	**Aasif Sheikh**	2021–2026
Source: ESPNcricinfo Last updated: 25 September 2026

== Individual records (bowling) ==
=== Most career wickets ===
Rank	Wickets	Innings	Player	BBI	Career span
1	142	78	**Sandeep Lamichhane**	5/9	2018–2026
2	112	92	**Karan KC**	5/21	2015–2026
3	89	92	**Sompal Kami**	3/20	2014–2026
4	75	59	**Abinash Bohara**	6/11	2019–2024
5	62	74	**Dipendra Singh Airee**	4/18	2018–2026
Source: ESPNcricinfo Last updated: 25 September 2026

=== Fastest Wicket taker ===
Wickets	Player	Matches	Record Date
50	**Sandeep Lamichhane**	29	14 February 2022
100	**Sandeep Lamichhane**	54	16 June 2024

=== Most four (and over) wickets in an innings ===
Rank	Total 4+-wicket hauls	Player	Innings	5-wicket hauls	4-wicket hauls	Career span
1	5	**Sandeep Lamichhane**	78	2	3	2018–2026
2	4	**Karan KC**	92	1	3	2015–2026
3	3	**Kushal Bhurtel**	33	0	3	2021–2026
3	3	**Abinash Bohara**	59	1	2	2019–2024
5	2	**Dipendra Singh Airee**	74	0	2	2018–2026
Source: Cricinfo. Last updated: 25 September 2026

=== Most wickets against each team ===
Opposition	Wickets	Bowler	Matches	Innings	Ref
Afghanistan	4	**Kushal Bhurtel**	1	1	
Bangladesh	1	Basanta Regmi	1	1	
Bhutan	2	Paras Khadka	1	1	
Canada	3	**Sandeep Lamichhane**	1	1	
China	3	**Kushal Malla**	1	1	
England	2	**Dipendra Singh Airee**	1	1	
England	2	**Nandan Yadav**	1	1	
Hong Kong	10	**Karan KC**	4	4	
India	2	**Dipendra Singh Airee**	1	1	
Ireland	4	**Dipendra Singh Airee**	2	1	
Ireland	4	**Abinash Bohara**	2	2	
Japan	2	**Gulsan Jha**	2	1	
Japan	2	**Sandeep Lamichhane**	2	1	
Kenya	12	**Sandeep Lamichhane**	5	5	
Kuwait	3	**Sandeep Lamichhane**	1	1	
Kuwait	3	Basanta Regmi	1	1	
Kuwait	3	**Sompal Kami**	2	2	
Malaysia	19	**Sandeep Lamichhane**	9	9	
Maldives	6	**Abinash Bohara**	3	3	
Mongolia	2	**Abinash Bohara**	1	1	
Mongolia	2	**Karan KC**	1	1	
Mongolia	2	**Sandeep Lamichhane**	1	1	
Namibia	3	**Karan KC**	2	2	
Netherlands	18	**Karan KC**	15	15	
Oman	11	**Sandeep Lamichhane**	6	6	
Papua New Guinea	11	**Karan KC**	4	4	
Philippines	3	**Sandeep Lamichhane**	1	1	
Qatar	3	**Sandeep Lamichhane**	1	1	
Qatar	3	**Gulsan Jha**	2	2	
Qatar	3	**Lalit Rajbanshi**	3	3	
Scotland	5	**Sandeep Lamichhane**	2	2	
Singapore	7	**Abinash Bohara**	3	3	
Thailand	3	**Karan KC**	1	1	
United Arab Emirates	14	**Abinash Bohara**	8	8	
United States	5	**Sompal Kami**	3	3	
West Indies	5	**Kushal Bhurtel**	4	4	
Zimbabwe	5	**Sandeep Lamichhane**	2	2	
Last updated: 26 September 2026

=== Best figures in an innings ===
Rank	Bowling	Player	Opponent	Venue	Date
1	6/11	Abinash Bohara	Maldives	Zhejiang University of Technology Cricket Field, Hangzhou	1 October 2023
2	5/9	Sandeep Lamichhane	Kenya	Gymkhana Club Ground, Nairobi	29 August 2022
3	5/18	Sandeep Lamichhane	Qatar	Oman Cricket Academy Ground Turf 1, Al Amarat	13 October 2025
4	5/21	Karan KC	Papua New Guinea	TU International Cricket Ground, Kirtipur	31 March 2022
5	4/11	Sandeep Lamichhane	Scotland	Titwood, Glasgow	17 June 2025
Source: ESPNcricinfo Last updated: 13 October 2025

=== Best figures in an innings – Progression of record ===
Figures	Player	Opposition	Venue	Date
3/9	Shakti Gauchan	Hong Kong	Chittagong, Bangladesh	16 March 2014
4/16	Basanta Regmi	Hong Kong	Belfast, Ireland	15 July 2015
5/21	Karan KC	Papua New Guinea	Kirtipur	31 March 2022
5/9	Sandeep Lamichhane	Kenya	Nairobi, Kenya	29 August 2022
6/11	Abinash Bohara	Maldives	Hangzhou	1 October 2023
Last Updated: 14 February 2024

=== Best Bowling Figure against each team ===
Opposition	BBI	Bowler	Ref
Afghanistan	**4/21**	**Kushal Bhurtel**	
Bangladesh	**2/10**	**Sompal Kami**	
Bhutan	**2/11**	Paras Khadka	
Canada	3/12	**Sandeep Lamichhane**	
China	**3/0**	**Kushal Malla**	
England	2/23	**Dipendra Singh Airee**	
Hong Kong	**4/15**	**Karan KC**	
India	2/31	**Dipendra Singh Airee**	
Ireland	**4/21**	**Dipendra Singh Airee**	
Japan	**2/20**	**Gulsan Jha**	
Kenya	5/9	**Sandeep Lamichhane**	
Kuwait	3/20	Basant Regmi	
Malaysia	4/27	**Abinash Bohara**	
Maldives	6/11	**Abinash Bohara**	
Mongolia	2/1	**Karan KC**	
Namibia	2/29	**Dipendra Singh Airee**	
Netherlands	4/17	**Karan KC**	
Oman	**3/10**	**Kushal Bhurtel**	
Papua New Guinea	**5/21**	**Karan KC**	
Philippines	**3/9**	**Sandeep Lamichhane**	
Qatar	**3/33**	**Sandeep Lamichhane**	
Scotland	4/11	**Sandeep Lamichhane**	
Singapore	**4/35**	**Abinash Bohara**	
Thailand	**3/12**	**Karan KC**	
United Arab Emirates	**3/11**	**Kushal Malla**	
United States	**3/27**	**Dipendra Singh Airee**	
United States	**3/27**	**Sompal Kami**	
West Indies	**4/24**	**Mohammad Aadil Alam**	
Zimbabwe	**3/15**	**Sandeep Lamichhane**	
Last updated: 26 September 2026

=== Best career averages ===
Rank	Average	Bowler	Innings	Runs	Wickets	Career span
1	12.80	**Sandeep Lamichhane**	78	1,818	142	2018–2026
2	15.11	**Kushal Bhurtel**	33	529	35	2021–2026
3	16.20	Basanta Regmi	18	405	25	2014–2019
4	16.96	**Kushal Malla**	33	424	25	2019–2024
5	19.18	**Nandan Yadav**	19	422	22	2018–2026
Qualification: 50 overs bowled. Source: Cricinfo. Last updated: 25 September 2026

=== Best career economy rates ===
Rank	Economy	Bowler	Runs	Overs Bowled	Career span
1	5.99	**Dipendra Singh Airee**	1,314	219.2	2018–2026
2	6.10	**Sandeep Lamichhane**	1,818	297.4	2018–2026
3	6.13	**Kushal Malla**	424	69.1	2019–2025
4	6.20	Paras Khadka	360	58.0	2014–2020
5	6.37	**Lalit Rajbanshi**	809	126.5	2018–2026
Qualification: 50 overs bowled. Source: Cricinfo. Last updated: 25 September 2026

=== Most runs conceded in an innings ===
Runs	Player	Overs	Opponent	Venue	Date
54	Basanta Regmi	4.0	Singapore	Indian Association Ground, Singapore	28 July 2019
53	Abinash Bohara	4.0	India	Zhejiang University of Technology Cricket Field, Hangzhou, China	3 October 2023
53	Karan KC	4.0	United Arab Emirates	Mulpani International Cricket Ground, Mulpani, Nepal	23 October 2023
50	Dipendra Singh Airee	4.0	Scotland	Titwood, Glasgow, Scotland	20 June 2025
49	Abinash Bohara	4.0	Namibia	Tribhuvan University International Cricket Ground, Kirtipur, Nepal	27 February 2024
49	Karan KC	4.0	Namibia	Tribhuvan University International Cricket Ground, Kirtipur, Nepal	1 March 2024
Source: Cricinfo. Last updated: 20 June 2025

=== Most wickets in a calendar year ===
Rank	Wickets	Player	Innings	BBI	Year
1	38	Sandeep Lamichhane	18	5/9	2022
2	28	Karan KC	19	4/17	2019
2	28	Sandeep Lamichhane	16	4/20	2019
4	24	Abinash Bohara	12	6/11	2023
4	24	Dipendra Singh Airee	21	3/21	2024
Source: Cricinfo. Last updated: 20 October 2024

=== Most wickets in a series ===
Rank	Wickets	Player	Innings	Series
1	13	**Karan KC**	5	2021–22 Nepal T20I Tri-Nation Series
1	13	**Sandeep Lamichhane**	5	2021 Nepal T20I Tri-Nation Series
3	12	**Sandeep Lamichhane**	5	2022 ICC Men's T20 World Cup Global Qualifier A
3	12	**Sandeep Lamichhane**	5	Nepalese cricket team in Kenya in 2022
3	12	**Sandeep Lamichhane**	6	2025 Men's T20 World Cup Asia–EAP Regional Final
Source: Cricinfo. Last updated: 17 October 2025

=== Hat-tricks ===
No.	Bowler	Against	Dismissals	Venue	Date	Ref.	Career span
1	Karan KC	Papua New Guinea	• Chad Soper (c Rohit Paudel) • Simon Atai (b) • Nosaina Pokana (c Dipendra Singh Airee)	Kirtipur	31 March 2022		2015–2023

== Wicket-keeping Records ==
The wicket-keeper is a specialist fielder who stands behind the stumps being guarded by the batsman on strike and is the only member of the fielding side allowed to wear gloves and leg pads.

=== Most career Dismissals ===
A wicket-keeper can be credited with the dismissal of a batsman in two ways, caught or stumped. A fair catch is taken when the ball is caught fully within the field of play without it bouncing after the ball has touched the striker's bat or glove holding the bat, Laws 5.6.2.2 and 5.6.2.3 state that the hand or the glove holding the bat shall be regarded as the ball striking or touching the bat while a stumping occurs when the wicket-keeper puts down the wicket while the batsman is out of his ground and not attempting a run.

Rank	Dismissals	Player	Innings	Catches	Stumpings	Career span
1	50	**Aasif Sheikh**	67	34	16	2021–2026
2	18	Binod Bhandari	33	10	8	2014–2024
3	5	Subash Khakurel	8	2	3	2014–2015
4	4	Pradeep Airee	2	3	1	2015–2022
4	4	Arjun Saud	3	2	2	2022
**Note: Innings refers to innings played as a designated wicket keeper. Source: ESPNcricinfo** **Last updated: 25 September 2026**

=== Most career catches ===
Rank	Catches	Player	Innings	Period
1	34	**Aasif Sheikh**	67	2021–2026
2	10	Binod Bhandari	33	2014–2024
3	3	Pradeep Airee	2	2015–2022
4	2	Subash Khakurel	8	2014–2015
4	2	Arjun Saud	3	2022
Source: Last Updated: 25 September 2026

=== Most career stumpings ===
Rank	Stumpings	Player	Innings	Period
1	16	**Aasif Sheikh**	67	2021–2026
2	8	Binod Bhandari	33	2014–2024
3	3	Subash Khakurel	8	2014–2015
4	2	Arjun Saud	3	2022-2022
5	1	Pradeep Airee	2	2015–2022
5	1	Dilip Nath	4	2022-2022
Source: Last Updated: 25 September 2026

=== Most dismissals in an innings ===
Rank	Dismissals	Player	Opposition	Venue	Date
1	4	**Aasif Sheikh**	Netherlands	Titwood, Glasgow, Scotland	19 June 2025
2	3	**Aasif Sheikh**	Oman	Oman Cricket Academy Ground, Al Amarat, Oman	11 February 2022
2	3	**Arjun Saud**	Kenya	Gymkhana Club Ground, Nairobi, Kenya	29 August 2022
2	3	**Aasif Sheikh**	United Arab Emirates	Mulpani International Cricket Ground, Mulpani, Nepal	18 October 2023
2	3	**Aasif Sheikh**	Kuwait	Mission Road Ground, Mong Kok, Hong Kong	13 April 2025
Last Updated: 19 June 2025. Qualification: 3+ dismissals Source:

=== Most dismissals in a series ===
Rank	Dismissals	Player	Matches	Innings	Series
1	12	**Aasif Sheikh**	8	8	2021–22 Oman Quadrangular Series
2	7	**Aasif Sheikh**	5	5	2022 ICC Men's T20 World Cup Global Qualifier A
3	6	**Aasif Sheikh**	5	5	2023 Nepal T20I Tri-Nation Series
4	5	**Aasif Sheikh**	3	3	2021–22 Oman Quadrangular Series
Qualification: 5+ Dismissals Source: Last Updated: 14 February 2024

== Individual records (fielding) ==
Does not include catches taken by wicketkeepers.

=== Most catches in career ===
Rank	Catches	Player	Innings	Career span
1	44	**Dipendra Singh Airee**	101	2018–2026
2	42	**Rohit Paudel**	85	2019–2026
3	41	**Kushal Bhurtel**	81	2021–2026
4	30	**Karan KC**	92	2015–2026
5	29	**Sompal Kami**	92	2014–2026
Source: Cricinfo. Last updated: 25 September 2026

=== Most catches in an innings ===
Rank	Dismissals	Player	Opposition	Venue	Date
1	4	**Pawan Sarraf**	Malaysia	Terdthai Cricket Ground, Bangkok, Thailand	29 February 2020
1	4	**Kushal Bhurtel**	Malaysia	Tribhuvan University International Cricket Ground, Kirtipur, Nepal	2 April 2022
3	3	**Binod Bhandari**	Hong Kong	Paikiasothy Saravanamuttu Stadium, Colombo, Sri Lanka	24 November 2014
3	3	Paras Khadka	United Arab Emirates	ICC Global Cricket Academy, Dubai, United Arab Emirates	1 February 2019
3	3	Gyanendra Malla	United Arab Emirates	ICC Global Cricket Academy, Dubai, United Arab Emirates	3 February 2019
3	3	**Rohit Paudel**	Oman	Tribhuvan University International Cricket Ground, Kirtipur, Nepal	5 November 2023
3	3	**Anil Sah**	United States	Grand Prairie Stadium, Dallas, United States	17 October 2024
3	3	**Kushal Bhurtel**	West Indies	Sharjah Cricket Stadium, Sharjah, United Arab Emirates	29 September 2025
Source: Last Updated: 29 September 2025

=== Most catches in a series ===
Rank	Catches	Player	Matches	Innings	Series
1	7	**Kushal Bhurtel**	5	5	2023 ICC Men's T20 World Cup Asia Qualifier
1	7	**Rohit Paudel**	5	5	2023 Nepal T20I Tri-Nation Series
2	5	5 players			
Source: Last Updated: 14 February 2024.

== Individual records (other) ==
=== Most matches played in career ===
Rank	Matches	Player	Career span
1	102	**Dipendra Singh Airee**	2018–2026
2	93	**Sompal Kami**	2014–2026
3	92	**Karan KC**	2015–2026
4	86	**Rohit Paudel**	2019–2026
5	82	**Kushal Bhurtel**	2021–2026
Source: Cricinfo. Last updated: 26 September 2026

=== Most Matches as captain ===
Matches	Player	Won	Lost	Tied	NR	Win%	Captaincy career
59	**Rohit Paudel**	33	21	3	2	60.52	2023–2026
27	Paras Khadka	11	15	0	1	42.30	2014–2019
18	**Sandeep Lamichhane**	13	5	0	0	72.22	2022-2022
12	Gyanendra Malla	9	3	0	0	75.00	2019–2021
8	**Dipendra Singh Airee**	6	1	0	1	85.71	2026–2026
Source: Cricinfo. Last updated: 26 September 2026

=== Most man of the match awards ===
Rank	M.O.M	Player	Matches	Period
1	12	**Kushal Bhurtel**	81	2021–2026
2	11	**Dipendra Singh Airee**	101	2018–2026
3	8	**Karan KC**	92	2015–2026
4	5	**Aasif Sheikh**	77	2018–2026
4	5	**Sandeep Lamichhane**	78	2018–2026
Source: Last updated: 25 September 2026

=== Most man of the series awards ===
Rank	M.O.S	Player	Period
1	2	**Kushal Bhurtel**	2021-2026
2	1	**Dipendra Singh Airee**	2018-2026
2	1	**Abinash Bohara**	2019-2024
2	1	**Sompal Kami**	2014-2026
2	1	Paras Khadka	2014-2020
2	1	**Sandeep Lamichhane**	2018-2026
Source:Last Updated: 30 September 2025

== Partnership records ==
Generally, in cricket, there are two batsmen who always present at the crease for batting together in a partnership. This partnership will continue until one of them is dismissed, retires or the innings comes to a close.

=== Highest partnerships by wicket ===
In cricket, A wicket partnership describes the number of runs scored before each wicket falls. The first wicket partnership is between the opening batsmen and continues until the first wicket falls. The second wicket partnership then commences between the not out batsman and the number three batsman. This partnership continues until the second wicket falls. The third wicket partnership then commences between the not out batsman and the new batsman. This continues down to the tenth wicket partnership. When the tenth wicket has fallen, there is no batsman left to partner so the innings is closed.

Partnership	Runs	Players	Opponent	Venue	Date
1st wicket	134	**Kushal Bhurtel** & **Aasif Sheikh**	Malaysia	Singapore National Cricket Ground, Singapore	4 June 2026
2nd wicket	147	**Kushal Bhurtel** & **Kushal Malla**	China	Singapore National Cricket Ground, Singapore	31 May 2026
3rd wicket	193	**Rohit Paudel** & **Kushal Malla**	Mongolia	Zhejiang University of Technology Cricket Field, Huangzhou, China	27 September 2023
4th wicket	100	**Sundeep Jora** & **Aasif Sheikh**	West Indies	Sharjah Cricket Stadium, Sharjah, United Arab Emirates	29 September 2025
5th wicket	145	**Kushal Malla** & **Dipendra Singh Airee**	Hong Kong	Mulpani International Cricket Ground, Mulpani, Nepal	21 October 2023
6th wicket	66	**Kushal Malla** & **Karan KC**	Malaysia	Tribhuvan University International Cricket Ground, Kirtipur, Nepal	22 April 2021
7th wicket	55	**Dipendra Singh Airee** & **Karan KC**	Netherlands	Tribhuvan University International Cricket Ground, Kirtipur, Nepal	28 February 2024
8th wicket	36	**Dipendra Singh Airee** & **Sompal Kami**	Namibia	Tribhuvan University International Cricket Ground, Kirtipur, Nepal	27 February 2024
8th wicket	36*	**Dipendra Singh Airee** & **Sompal Kami**	Qatar	Oman Cricket Academy Ground, Al Amarat, Oman	13 April 2024
9th wicket	72	**Nandan Yadav** & **Basir Ahamad**	Kuwait	Mission Road Ground, Mong Kok, Hong Kong	13 April 2025
10th wicket	15	**Rupesh Singh** & **Lalit Rajbanshi**	Scotland	Titwood, Glasgow, Scotland	20 June 2025
Note: An asterisk (*) signifies an unbroken partnership (i.e. neither of the batsmen were dismissed before either the end of the allotted overs or they reached the required score). Source: ESPNcricinfo Last updated: 4 June 2026

=== Highest partnerships by runs ===
Rank	Runs	Wicket	Players		Opponent	Venue	Date
1	193	3rd wicket	**Rohit Paudel**	**Kushal Malla**	Mongolia	Zhejiang University of Technology Cricket Field, Huangzhou, China	27 September 2023
2	175	2nd wicket	**Kushal Bhurtel**	**Kushal Malla**	China	Singapore National Cricket Ground, Singapore	31 May 2026
3	171	3rd wicket	**Kushal Bhurtel**	**Dipendra Singh Airee**	Philippines	Oman Cricket Academy Ground, Al Amarat, Oman	19 February 2022
4	145*	2nd wicket	Paras Khadka	**Aarif Sheikh**	Singapore	Indian Association Ground, Singapore	28 September 2019
5	145	5th wicket	**Kushal Malla**	**Dipendra Singh Airee**	Hong Kong	Mulpani International Cricket Ground, Mulpani, Nepal	21 October 2023
Note: An asterisk (*) signifies an unbroken partnership (i.e. neither of the batsmen were dismissed before either the end of the allotted overs or they reached the required score). Source: ESPNcricinfo Last updated: 31 May 2026

=== Highest overall partnership runs by a pair ===
Rank	Runs	Innings	Batsmen	Highest	Average	100	50	T20I career span
1	2,107	67	**Aasif Sheikh** & **Kushal Bhurtel**	134	31.44	4	9	2021–2026
2	867	30	**Dipendra Singh Airee** & **Rohit Paudel**	96	30.96	0	6	2019–2026
3	795	34	**Aasif Sheikh** & **Rohit Paudel**	99	24.09	0	5	2022–2026
4	749	23	**Kushal Malla** & **Rohit Paudel**	193	35.66	2	3	2023–2025
5	607	18	**Kushal Bhurtel** & **Kushal Malla**	175	35.70	1	3	2021–2026
An asterisk (*) signifies an unbroken partnership (i.e. neither of the batsmen was dismissed before either the end of the allotted overs or the required score being reached). Source: Last updated: 26 September 2026

== See also ==
- Nepal national cricket team
- List of Nepal Twenty20 International cricketers
- List of Twenty20 International records
- List of Nepal One Day International records
- List of Nepal women Twenty20 international records
