= 2023 Nepal Tri-Nation Series =

The 2023 Nepal Tri-Nation Series can refer to:

- 2023 Nepal Tri-Nation Series (round 19), a cricket tri-series in February 2023 between Namibia, Nepal and Scotland
- 2023 Nepal Tri-Nation Series (round 21), a cricket tri-series in March 2023 between Nepal, Papua New Guinea and the United Arab Emirates
- 2023 Nepal T20I Tri-Nation Series, a cricket tri-series in October 2023 between Nepal, Hong Kong and the United Arab Emirates
