= 2025 Women's T20 World Cup Americas Qualifier =

Qualifying tournament for 2026 Women's T20 World Cup

- Dates: 10 – 17 March 2025
- Administrator: ICC Americas
- Cricket format: Twenty20 International
- Tournament format: Double round-robin
- Host: Argentina
- Champions: United States
- Runners-up: Canada
- Participants: 4
- Matches: 12
- Player of the series: (United States) Ritu Singh
- Most runs: (United States) Disha Dhingra (123)
- Most wickets: (United States) Aditiba Chudasama (10)

The 2025 ICC Women's T20 World Cup Americas Qualifier was a cricket tournament that formed part of the qualification process for the 2026 Women's T20 World Cup. The tournament was hosted by Argentina in March 2025. United States won the tournament and advanced to the Global Qualifier. Canada finished as runners-up after losing to the United States in the final match.

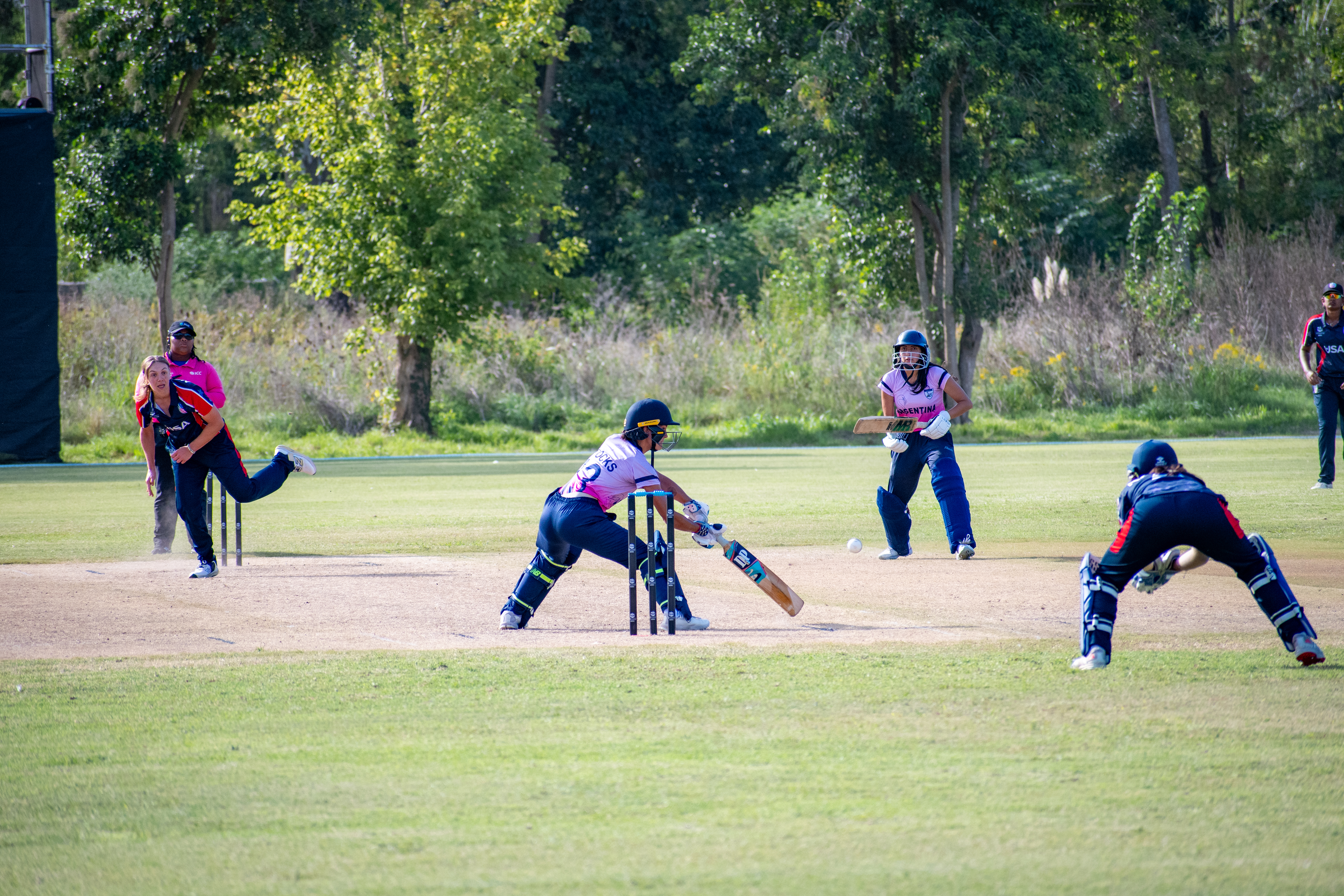
Tara Norris of the USA bowling to Argentina's Albertina Galan

== Squads ==
Argentina	Brazil	Canada	United States
Alison Stocks (c); Maria Castiñeiras (vc); Tamara Basile; Milagros Bestani; Julieta Cullen; Albertina Galan; Francesca Galan; Maria Lehmann; Malena Lollo (wk); Mariana Martinez; Naara Patron Fuentes (wk); Alison Prince; Constanza Sosa; Lucia Taylor	Carolina Nascimento (c); Roberta Moretti Avery; Laura Agatha; Lindsay Vilas Boas; Laura Cardoso; Mayara dos Santos (wk); Monnike Machado (wk); Lara Moisés; Evelyn Muller; Nicole Monteiro; Maria Ribeiro; Giulia Ribeiro; Ana Sabino; Maria Silva	Amarpal Kaur (c); Achini Perera (vc); Habeeba Bader (wk); Indomatie Goordial-John; Mannat Hundal; Mohini Kalra; Krima Kapadia; Terisha Lavia; Vandana Mahajan; Kainat Qazi; Rabbjyot Rajput; Tiffany Thorpe; Vijayani Vithanage; Belinda Williams	Anika Kolan (c); Aditiba Chudasama (vc); Gargi Bhogle; Ella Claridge; Disha Dhingra; Saanvi Immadi; Geetika Kodali; Maahi Madhavan; Tara Norris; Chetna Pagydyala; Chetnaa Prasad; Bhakti Shastri; Ritu Singh; Isani Vaghela

== Warm-up matches ==
Warm-up matches

6 March 2025
10:00
Scorecard

Brazil; 76/8 (20 overs)	v	Canada; 78/1 (18.3 overs)
Laura Agatha 28 (33); Mannat Hundal 2/16 (4 overs)		Indomatie Goordial-John 40* (54)

Canada won by 9 wickets
Estadio Belgrano Athletic, Buenos Aires
Player of the match: Amarpal Kaur (Can)

- Canada won the toss and elected to field.

6 March 2025
19:00 (D/N)
Scorecard

Brazil; 67/2 (12 overs)	v	Argentina
Lindsay Vilas Boas 24 (29); Alison Stocks 1/14 (3 overs)

No result
Estadio Belgrano Athletic, Buenos Aires

- Argentina won the toss and elected to field.
- No further play was possible due to bad light.

7 March 2025
17:30 (D/N)
Scorecard

Canada; 138/5 (20 overs)	v	Argentina; 54 (15.1 overs)
Achini Perera 47 (42); Julieta Cullen 1/13 (2 overs)		Julieta Cullen 18 (19); Terisha Lavia 4/2 (2.1 overs)

Canada won by 84 runs
Estadio Belgrano Athletic, Buenos Aires
Player of the match: Terisha Lavia (Can)

- Canada won the toss and elected to bat.

== Points table ==
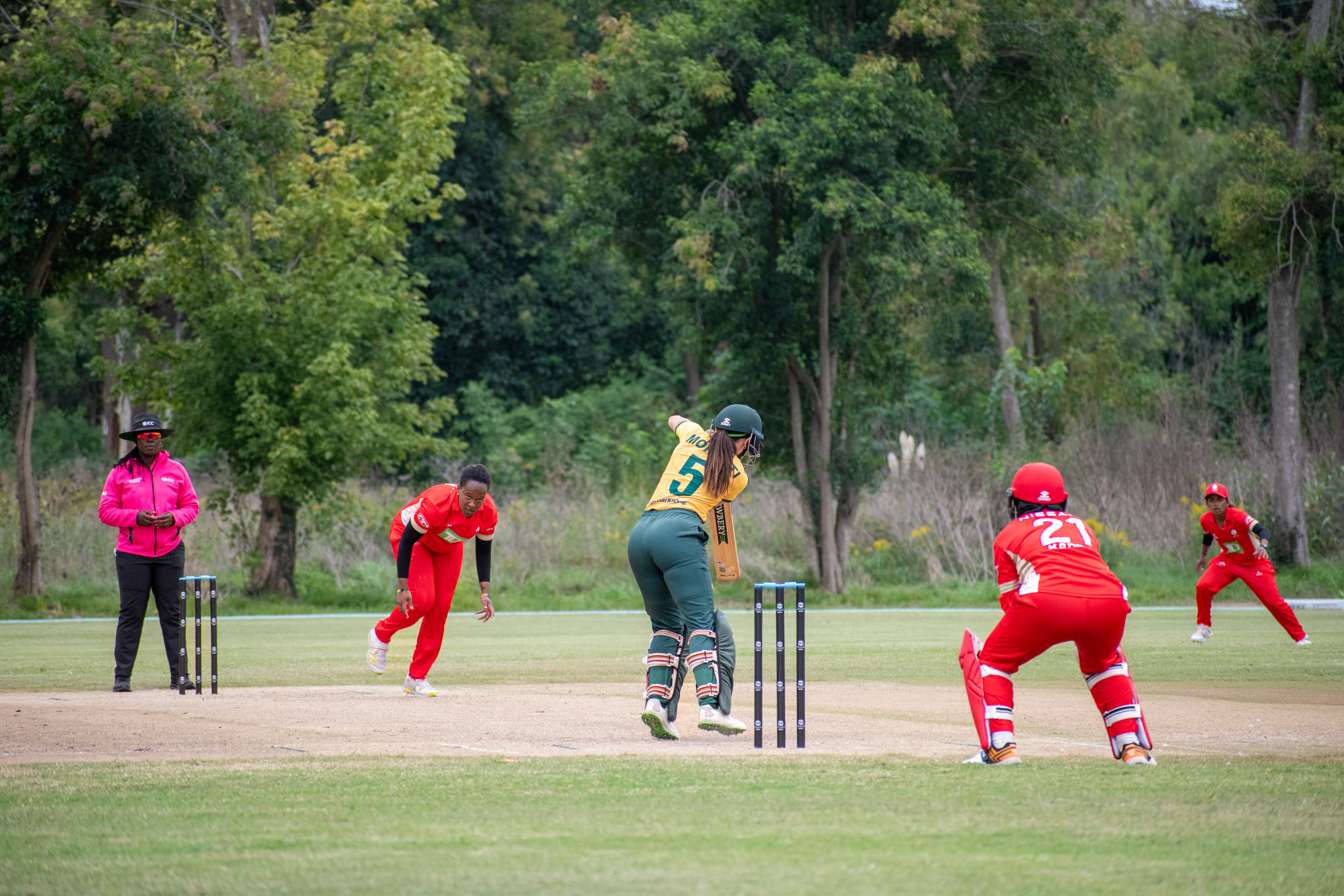
Canada's Tiffany Thorpe bowling to Brazil's Roberta Avery

Pos	Team	Pld	W	L	NR	Pts	NRR	Qualification
1	United States	6	5	1	0	10	3.295	Advanced to the global qualifier
2	Canada	6	4	2	0	8	0.243	
3	Brazil	6	2	4	0	4	−1.321	
4	Argentina	6	1	5	0	2	−1.794	

Source: ESPNcricinfo

== Fixtures ==
10 March 2025
11:00
Scorecard

Canada; 51/0 (7 overs)	v	United States; 42/3 (7 overs)
Achini Perera 28* (23)		Disha Dhingra 15 (18); Amarpal Kaur 2/9 (2 overs)

Canada won by 9 runs
Club San Albano, Burzaco
Umpires: Maria Abbott (WI) and Jacqueline Williams (WI)
Player of the match: Amarpal Kaur (Can)

- Canada won the toss and elected to bat.
- The match was reduced to 7 overs per side due to rain.
- Indomatie Goordial-John, Terisha Lavia, Vandana Mahajan, Tiffany Thorpe (Can) and Ella Claridge (USA) all made their T20I debuts.

10 March 2025
15:30
Scorecard

Brazil; 69/8 (20 overs)	v	Argentina; 44 (15.1 overs)
Laura Agatha 14 (28); Constanza Sosa 3/16 (4 overs)		Malena Lollo 10 (13); Nicole Monteiro 5/7 (4 overs)

Brazil won by 25 runs
Club San Albano, Burzaco
Umpires: Candace la Borde (WI) and Jermaine Lindo (USA)
Player of the match: Nicole Monteiro (Bra)

- Argentina won the toss and elected to field.
- Milagros Bestani and Maria Lehmann (Arg) both made their T20I debuts.
- Nicole Monteiro (Bra) took her first five-wicket haul in T20Is.

11 March 2025
11:00
Scorecard

United States; 105/9 (20 overs)	v	Brazil; 29 (19.1 overs)
Anika Kolan 32* (37); Maria Ribeiro 3/16 (4 overs)		Maria Silva 7 (23); Ritu Singh 3/6 (4 overs)

United States won by 76 runs
Club San Albano, Burzaco
Umpires: Candace la Borde (WI) and Jacqueline Williams (WI)
Player of the match: Ritu Singh (USA)

- Brazil won the toss and elected to field.
- Maahi Madhavan (USA) made her T20I debut.

11 March 2025
15:30
Scorecard

Argentina; 95/4 (20 overs)	v	Canada; 94 (20 overs)
Malena Lollo 41* (49); Mannat Hundal 3/19 (4 overs)		Vandana Mahajan 20 (28); Albertina Galan 3/12 (4 overs)

Argentina won by 1 run
Club San Albano, Burzaco
Umpires: Maria Abbott (WI) and Jermaine Lindo (USA)
Player of the match: Malena Lollo (Arg)

- Canada won the toss and elected to field.

13 March 2025
11:00
Scorecard

United States; 124/4 (20 overs)	v	Argentina; 53/9 (20 overs)
Chetna Pagydyala 36* (43); Constanza Sosa 1/21 (4 overs)		Constanza Sosa 11* (15); Aditiba Chudasama 3/8 (4 overs)

United States won by 71 runs
Club San Albano, Burzaco
Umpires: Candace la Borde (WI) and Jacqueline Williams (WI)
Player of the match: Aditiba Chudasama (USA)

- Argentina won the toss and elected to field.

13 March 2025
15:30
Scorecard

Brazil; 56 (17.1 overs)	v	Canada; 58/3 (13.3 overs)
Roberta Moretti Avery 16 (33); Terisha Lavia 3/7 (2.1 overs)		Habeeba Bader 21* (31); Lara Moisés 1/3 (2 overs)

Canada won by 7 wickets
Club San Albano, Burzaco
Umpires: Maria Abbott (WI) and Jermaine Lindo (USA)
Player of the match: Terisha Lavia (Can)

- Brazil won the toss and elected to bat.
- Mohini Kalra (Can) made her T20I debut.

14 March 2025
11:00
Scorecard

Canada; 110/3 (20 overs)	v	Argentina; 74 (19.2 overs)
Indomatie Goordial-John 42 (50)		Alison Stocks 25 (38); Krima Kapadia 2/5 (2 overs)

Canada won by 36 runs
Club San Albano, Burzaco
Umpires: Candace la Borde (WI) and Jermaine Lindo (USA)
Player of the match: Indomatie Goordial-John (Can)

- Canada won the toss and elected to bat.

14 March 2025
15:30
Scorecard

United States; 141/3 (20 overs)	v	Brazil; 75/7 (20 overs)
Disha Dhingra 52 (44); Maria Ribeiro 1/24 (4 overs)		Lindsay Vilas Boas 23 (24); Chetnaa Prasad 4/8 (3 overs)

United States won by 66 runs
Club San Albano, Burzaco
Umpires: Maria Abbott (WI) and Jacqueline Williams (WI)
Player of the match: Disha Dhingra (USA)

- Brazil won the toss and elected to field.

16 March 2025
11:00
Scorecard

Canada; 82 (19.1 overs)	v	Brazil; 53/8 (20 overs)
Amarpal Kaur 25 (27); Lara Moisés 3/6 (4 overs)		Monnike Machado 12* (30); Indomatie Goordial-John 2/9 (4 overs); Terisha Lavia 2/9 (4 overs)

Canada won by 29 runs
Club San Albano, Burzaco
Umpires: Jermaine Lindo (USA) and Jacqueline Williams (WI)
Player of the match: Terisha Lavia (Can)

- Canada won the toss and elected to bat.

16 March 2025
15:30
Scorecard

Argentina; 63/9 (20 overs)	v	United States; 64/2 (9 overs)
Alison Stocks 16 (46); Aditiba Chudasama 4/11 (4 overs)		Chetna Pagydyala 22* (26); Albertina Galan 1/22 (4 overs)

United States won by 8 wickets
Club San Albano, Burzaco
Umpires: Maria Abbott (WI) and Candace la Borde (WI)
Player of the match: Aditiba Chudasama (USA)

- United States won the toss and elected to field.

17 March 2025
11:00
Scorecard

Argentina; 54 (17 overs)	v	Brazil; 55/4 (14.3 overs)
Alison Stocks 11 (23); Carolina Nascimento 5/12 (4 overs)		Roberta Moretti Avery 27* (42); Lucia Taylor 1/8 (3 overs)

Brazil won by 6 wickets
Club San Albano, Burzaco
Umpires: Jermaine Lindo (USA) and Jacqueline Williams (WI)
Player of the match: Carolina Nascimento (Bra)

- Brazil won the toss and elected to field.
- Giulia Ribeiro (Bra) made her T20I debut.
- Carolina Nascimento (Bra) took her first five-wicket haul in T20Is.

17 March 2025
15:30
Scorecard

United States; 131/6 (20 overs)	v	Canada; 53 (16 overs)
Chetna Pagydyala 35 (33); Terisha Lavia 2/19 (4 overs)		Achini Perera 19 (28); Chetnaa Prasad 4/5 (2 overs)

United States won by 78 runs
Club San Albano, Burzaco
Umpires: Maria Abbott (WI) and Candace la Borde (WI)
Player of the match: Chetnaa Prasad (USA)

- United States won the toss and elected to bat.
