= Indomatie Goordial-John =

West Indian cricketer (born 1985)

Personal information
- Full name: Indomatie Goordial
- Born: 9 August 1985 (age 41); Unity Village, Demerara, Guyana
- Batting: Right-handed
- Bowling: Right-arm off break
- Role: Bowler

International information
- National sides: West Indies (2003–2005); Canada (2025)
- Only Test (cap 24): 15 March 2004; West Indies v Pakistan
- ODI debut (cap 50): 22 July 2003; West Indies v Netherlands
- Last ODI: 26 March 2005; West Indies v Australia
- T20I debut (cap 28): 10 March 2025; Canada v United States
- Last T20I: 11 March 2025; Canada v Argentina

Domestic team information
- Years: Team
- 2001–2005: Guyana

Career statistics
Competition	Test	ODI	T20I	LA
Matches	1	10	6	28
Runs scored	8	40	87	246
Batting average	4.00	10.00	17.40	17.57
100s/50s	0/0	0/0	0/0	0/1
Top score	5	15	42	54
Balls bowled	108	421	110	853
Wickets	0	12	5	33
Bowling average	–	16.58	16.20	14.66
5 wickets in innings	–	0	0	0
10 wickets in match	–	0	0	0
Best bowling	–	4/17	2/9	4/17
Catches/stumpings	0/–	2/–	1/–	4/–
- Source: CricketArchive, 4 August 2025

Indomatie Goordial-John (née Goordial; born 9 August 1985) is a Guyanese former cricketer who played as a right-arm off break bowler. She appeared in one Test match and ten One Day Internationals for the West Indies between 2003 and 2005. In 2010, she appeared in five Twenty20 matches for the United States against Canada. Despite ICC regulations prohibiting players from representing more than two national teams, she was selected in Canada's squad for the 2025 Women's T20 World Cup Americas Qualifier and played in all six of Canada's games. She played domestic cricket for Guyana.
