= 2026 Women's T20 World Cup Global Qualifier =

International cricket tournament

2026 ICC Women's T20 World Cup Global Qualifier
- Tournament logo
- Dates: 18 January – 1 February 2026
- Administrator: International Cricket Council
- Cricket format: Women's Twenty20 International
- Tournament format(s): Group stage and Super 6 stage
- Host: Nepal
- Champions: Bangladesh (4th title)
- Runners-up: Ireland
- Participants: 10
- Matches: 29
- Most runs: (Ireland) Gaby Lewis (276)
- Most wickets: (United States) Tara Norris (15)
- Official website: icc-cricket.com

The 2026 ICC Women's T20 World Cup Global Qualifier was the seventh edition of the ICC Women's T20 World Cup Global Qualifier, hosted by Cricket Association of Nepal from 18 January 1 February 2026. It served as the final stage of the qualification process for the 2026 ICC Women's T20 World Cup. Ten teams competed in 29 matches across two venues in Nepal.

Sri Lanka were the defending champions; whom had already directly qualified for the 2026 T20 World Cup. No dedicated final match was held in the tournament; instead placements were decided by the final points table standings. Bangladesh finished atop the final points table to win their 4th Global Qualifier title. Top 4 teams in the tournament: Bangladesh, Ireland, Scotland and the Netherlands qualified for the 2026 T20 World Cup.

== Background ==
The ICC Women's T20 World Cup Global Qualifier is a biennial international cricket competition in Women's Twenty20 International (WT20I) format, organised by the International Cricket Council (ICC). It serves as the final stage of the qualification process for the ICC Women's T20 World Cup. Sri Lanka were the defending champions having won the 2024 Global Qualifier; whom had already directly qualified for the 2026 T20 World Cup.

=== Host selection ===
In July 2022, as part of the 2024–2027 ICC women's hosts cycle, the ICC announced that the 2026 Women's T20 World Cup would be played in England. In August 2025, the ICC announced that the 2026 Global Qualifier would be played in Nepal with the goal of boosting the development of the sport in the country. On 6 January 2026, the Cricket Association of Nepal (CAN) announced that a preparation series would be held ahead of the tournament from 7 to 11 January. On 7 January, the ICC announced the tournament schedule with the matches taking place from 18 January to 1 February.

=== Format ===
The tournament remained as a 10-team competition after the 2024 tournament's expansion. However, a new Super 6 stage was introduced to replace the knockout stage. The 10 participating teams were divided into two groups of five each. In the group stage, each team played each of the other teams in the group once in a round-robin format for 20 matches, and the top three teams in each group advanced to the Super 6 stage.

Results of the matches against other advanced teams in the respective group were carried over to the Super 6 stage, thus each team played only against the three teams advanced from the other group. No knockout stage or a dedicated final match was played; instead placements were decided by the final points table standings. As the T20 World Cup expanded to 12 teams from 2026 onwards, the top four teams from the Global Qualifier were qualified for the 2026 T20 World Cup.

== Qualification ==
The bottom two teams from the 2024 T20 World Cup: Bangladesh and Scotland received direct qualification, while the remaining 8 spots were filled by teams advancing from the regional qualifiers: Namibia and Zimbabwe from Africa, the United States from Americas, Nepal and Thailand from Asia, Papua New Guinea from East Asia-Pacific and Ireland and the Netherlands from Europe.

Teams qualified for the tournament
Method of qualification	Date	Venue	No. of teams	Teams
2024 Women's T20 World Cup	3 – 20 October 2024	United Arab Emirates	2	Bangladesh
2024 Women's T20 World Cup	3 – 20 October 2024	United Arab Emirates	2	Scotland
Americas Qualifier	10 – 17 March 2025	Argentina	1	United States
Asia Qualifier	9 – 20 May 2025	Thailand	2	Nepal
Asia Qualifier	9 – 20 May 2025	Thailand	2	Thailand
Europe Qualifier	20 – 27 August 2025	Netherlands	2	Ireland
Europe Qualifier	20 – 27 August 2025	Netherlands	2	Netherlands
Africa Qualifier	31 August – 6 September 2025	Namibia	2	Namibia
Africa Qualifier	31 August – 6 September 2025	Namibia	2	Zimbabwe
EAP Qualifier	9 – 15 September 2025	Fiji	1	Papua New Guinea
Total			12	

== Venues ==
The tournament was played across 2 venues in Nepal: 13 matches at Mulpani International Cricket Ground in Kageshwari-Manohara and 16 matches at Tribhuvan University International Cricket Ground in Kirtipur.

Venues in Nepal
A map of Nepal with pin-points on 2026 Women's T20 World Cup Global Qualifier venues
Kageshwari-Manohara	Kirtipur
Mulpani International Cricket Ground	Tribhuvan University International Cricket Ground
Capacity: 4,000	Capacity: 13,000
Matches: 13	Matches: 16
Mulpani International Cricket Ground in 2023	Tribhuvan University International Cricket Ground in 2025

== Squads ==
Following squads were announced for the tournament:

- Bangladesh: Dilara Akter (wk), Marufa Akter, Nahida Akter, Sharmin Akhter, Shorna Akter, Juairiya Ferdous (wk), Fargana Haque, Fahima Khatun, Rabeya Khan, Sultana Khatun, Sanjida Akter Meghla, Ritu Moni, Sobhana Mostary, Nigar Sultana (c, wk), Fariha Trisna
- Ireland: Ava Canning, Christina Coulter Reilly (wk), Alana Dalzell, Laura Delany, Sarah Forbes, Amy Hunter (wk), Arlene Kelly, Gaby Lewis (c), Aimee Maguire, Jane Maguire, Lara McBride, Cara Murray, Leah Paul, Orla Prendergast, Rebecca Stokell
- Namibia: Naomi Benjamin, Jurriene Diergaardt, Merczerly Gorases, Kayleen Green, Victoria Hamunyela, Eveleen Kejarukua, Yasmeen Khan (wk), Bianca Manuel, Mekelaye Mwatile, Wilka Mwatile, Sylvia Shihepo, Edelle Van Zyl, Leigh-Marie Visser, Saima Tuhadeleni, Sune Wittmann (c)
- Nepal Rajmati Airee, Indu Barma (c), Suman Bista, Rachana Chaudhary, Rubina Chhetri, Kabita Joshi, Samjhana Khadka, Kabita Kunwar, Sita Rana Magar, Puja Mahato, Bindu Rawal, Riya Sharma, Kajal Shrestha (wk), Roma Thapa, Manisha Upadhaya
- Netherlands: Merel Dekeling, Caroline de Lange, Babette de Leede (c, wk), Sterre Kalis, Sanya Khurana, Hannah Landheer, Lara Leemhuis, Phebe Molkenboer, Frederique Overdijk, Robine Rijke, Heather Siegers (wk), Silver Siegers, Myrthe van den Raad, Isabel van der Woning, Iris Zwilling
- Papua New Guinea: Melanie Ani, Hollan Doriga, Kevau Frank, Sibona Jimmy, Dika Lohia, Konio Oala, Miria Raio, Pauke Siaka, Brenda Tau (c, wk), Hane Tau, Henao Thomas, Geua Tom, Mairi Tom, Isabel Toua, Naoani Vare
- Scotland" Chloe Abel, Olivia Bell, Kathryn Bryce (c), Sarah Bryce (wk), Darcey Carter, Priyanaz Chatterji, Katherine Fraser, Ailsa Lister (wk), Abtaha Maqsood, Megan McColl, Mollie Parker, Hannah Rainey, Niamh Robertson-Jack, Rachel Slater, Pippa Sproul
- Thailand: Nattaya Boochatham, Nannaphat Chaihan, Naruemol Chaiwai (c), Natthakan Chantham, Sunida Chaturongrattana, Onnicha Kamchomphu, Rosenanee Kanoh, Suwanan Khiaoto (wk), Nannapat Koncharoenkai (wk), Suleeporn Laomi, Phannita Maya, Chayanisa Phengpaen, Thipatcha Putthawong, Chanida Sutthiruang, Aphisara Suwanchonrathi
- United States: Gargi Bhogle, Taranum Chopra, Aditiba Chudasama (c), Ella Claridge (wk), Disha Dhingra, Pooja Ganesh (wk), Saanvi Immadi, Sainavi Kambalapalli, Geetika Kodali, Maahi Madhavan, Tara Norris, Chetna Pagydyala, Lekha Shetty, Ritu Singh, Isani Vaghela
- Zimbabwe: Beloved Biza, Christabel Chatonzwa, Chiedza Dhururu (wk), Nyasha Gwanzura, Lindokuhle Mabhero, Audrey Mazvishaya, Chipo Mugeri-Tiripano (c), Modester Mupachikwa, Christine Mutasa, Kelis Ndhlovu, Josephine Nkomo, Loryn Phiri, Nomvelo Sibanda, Loreen Tshuma, Adel Zimunu

== Nepal women's preparation series ==
The CAN organised a preparation series of three women's Twenty20 cricket matches from 7 to 11 January 2026 at the Mulpani Cricket Ground. Nepal was scheduled to play against the United States, Scotland and Zimbabwe respectively, however due to Zimbabwe's unavailability, Nepal played against the United States twice.

Preparation match 1
7 January 2026
12:45 UTC+5:45
Scorecard

Nepal; 153/4 (20 overs)	v	United States; 156/2 (16.2 overs)
Samjhana Khadka 54 (28); Ritu Singh 2/23 (4 overs)		Ella Claridge 76 (45); Suman Bista 1/14 (2 overs)

United States won by 8 wickets
Mulpani International Cricket Ground, Kageshwari-Manohara
Umpires: Rabindra Gupta (NEP) and Himal Raj Giri (NEP)
Player of the match: Ella Claridge (USA)

- Nepal won the toss and elected to bat.

Preparation match 2
9 January 2026
08:45 UTC+5:45
Scorecard

Scotland; 183/6 (20 overs)	v	Nepal; 156/6 (20 overs)
Kathryn Bryce* 62 (28); Rubina Chhetri 2/8 (2 overs)		Samjhana Khadka 52 (43); Darcey Carter 3/15 (3 overs)

Scotland won by 27 runs
Mulpani International Cricket Ground, Kageshwari-Manohara
Umpires: Rabindra Gupta (NEP) and Ashish Jha (NEP)
Player of the match: Kathryn Bryce (SCO)

- Scotland won the toss and elected to bat.

Preparation match 3
11 January 2026
13:15 UTC+5:45
Scorecard

United States; 157/7 (20 overs)	v	Nepal; 158/6 (19 overs)
Ella Claridge 39 (23); Manisha Upadhaya 2/31 (3 overs)		Samjhana Khadka 49 (32); Tara Norris 2/24 (3 overs)

Nepal won by 4 wickets
Mulpani International Cricket Ground, Kageshwari-Manohara
Umpires: Rabindra Gupta (NEP) and Ashish Jha (NEP)
Player of the match: Samjhana Khadka (NEP)

- United States won the toss and elected to bat.

== Warm-up matches ==
A total of 10 official warm-up fixtures were played with each team playing two matches: one on 14 January and another on 16 January 2026.

Warm-up match 1
14 January 2026
09:00 UTC+5:45
Scorecard

Bangladesh; 151/3 (20 overs)	v	Netherlands; 125/7 (20 overs)
Nigar Sultana 75* (51); Robine Rijke 1/4 (1 over)		Sterre Kalis 31 (23); Rabeya Khan 3/17 (4 overs)

Bangladesh won by 26 runs
Tribhuvan University International Cricket Ground, Kirtipur
Umpires: Sarah Dambanevana (Zim) and Jonathan Kennedy (Ire)
Player of the match: Nigar Sultana (Ban)

- Netherlands won the toss and elected to field.

Warm-up match 2
14 January 2026
09:00 UTC+5:45
Scorecard

Papua New Guinea; 131/6 (20 overs)	v	Zimbabwe; 120/9 (20 overs)
Konio Oala 71 (52); Josephine Nkomo 1/14 (4 overs)		Josephine Nkomo 32 (30); Hane Tau 4/19 (4 overs)

Papua New Guinea won by 11 runs
Mulpani International Cricket Ground, Kageshwari-Manohara
Umpires: Rizwan Akram (Ned) and Shathira Jakir (Ban)
Player of the match: Konio Oala (PNG)

- Zimbabwe won the toss and elected to field.

Warm-up match 3
14 January 2026
09:00 UTC+5:45
Scorecard

Ireland; 200/7 (20 overs)	v	Nepal; 101 (19 overs)
Gaby Lewis 77 (38); Rubina Chhetri 2/17 (3 overs)		Kabita Joshi 28 (29); Aimee Maguire 2/3 (2 overs)

Ireland won by 99 runs
Lower Mulpani Cricket Stadium, Kageshwari-Manohara
Umpires: Vijaya Mallela (USA) and Sue Redfern (Eng)

- Ireland won the toss and elected to bat.

Warm-up match 4
14 January 2026
13:00 UTC+5:45
Scorecard

Namibia; 107/5 (20 overs)	v	Thailand; 111/3 (16.3 overs)
Yasmeen Khan 54 (49); Sunida Chaturongrattana 2/21 (4 overs)		Nannapat Koncharoenkai 30* (23); Leigh-Marie Visser 1/11 (1 over)

Thailand won by 7 wickets
Tribhuvan University International Cricket Ground, Kirtipur
Umpires: Saleema Imtiaz (Pak) and Kerrin Klaaste (SA)
Player of the match: Yasmeen Khan (Nam)

- Namibia won the toss and elected to bat.

Warm-up match 5
14 January 2026
13:00 UTC+5:45
Scorecard

Scotland; 149/6 (20 overs)	v	United States; 153/6 (18.5 overs)
Darcey Carter 57 (42); Maahi Madhavan 1/23 (3 overs)		Chetna Pagydyala 41 (38); Olivia Bell 1/4 (1 over)

United States won by 4 wickets
Mulpani International Cricket Ground, Kageshwari-Manohara
Umpires: Shivani Mishra (Qat) and Buddhi Pradhan (Nep)
Player of the match: Darcey Carter (Sco)

- United States won the toss and elected to field.

Warm-up match 6
16 January 2026
09:00 UTC+5:45
Scorecard

Zimbabwe; 125/6 (20 overs)	v	Ireland; 128/6 (19 overs)
Chiedza Dhururu 42* (38); Cara Murray 2/21 (4 overs)		Orla Prendergast 53 (37); Christabel Chatonzwa 1/11 (3 overs)

Ireland won by 6 wickets
Tribhuvan University International Cricket Ground, Kirtipur
Umpires: Saleema Imtiaz (Pak) and Kerrin Klaaste (SA)
Player of the match: Orla Prendergast (Ire)

- Ireland won the toss and elected to field.

Warm-up match 7
16 January 2026
09:00 UTC+5:45
Scorecard

Papua New Guinea; 111/9 (20 overs)	v	Scotland; 112/3 (13 overs)
Brenda Tau 34 (33); Priyanaz Chatterji 3/11 (3 overs)		Kathryn Bryce 38 (21); Sibona Jimmy 1/10 (2 overs)

Scotland won by 7 wickets
Mulpani International Cricket Ground, Kageshwari-Manohara
Umpires: Vijaya Mallela (USA) and Shivani Mishra (Qat)

- Papua New Guinea won the toss and elected to bat.

Warm-up match 8
16 January 2026
09:00 UTC+5:45
Scorecard

Netherlands; 201/7 (20 overs)	v	Namibia; 115 (20 overs)
Heather Siegers 86 (39); Jurriene Diergaardt 3/28 (4 overs)		Yasmeen Khan 51 (31); Silver Siegers 3/20 (3 overs)

Netherlands won by 86 runs
Lower Mulpani Cricket Stadium, Kageshwari-Manohara
Umpires: Shathira Jakir (Ban) and Buddhi Pradhan (Nep)
Player of the match: Heather Siegers (Sco)

- Namibia won the toss and elected to field.

Warm-up match 9
16 January 2026
13:00 UTC+5:45
Scorecard

Nepal; 136/9 (20 overs)	v	United States; 138/4 (19.1 overs)
Bindu Rawal 27 (28); Taranum Chopra 3/23 (4 overs)		Chetna Pagydyala 56* (46); Suman Bista 1/23 (3.1 overs)

United States won by 6 wickets
Tribhuvan University International Cricket Ground, Kirtipur
Umpires: Sarah Dambanevana (Zim) and Jonathan Kennedy (Ire)
Player of the match: Chetna Pagydyala (USA)

- United States won the toss and elected to field.

Warm-up match 10
16 January 2026
13:00 UTC+5:45
Scorecard

Bangladesh; 149/4 (20 overs)	v	Thailand; 115/7 (20 overs)
Juairiya Ferdous 31 (29); Suleeporn Laomi 2/32 (4 overs)		Nannapat Koncharoenkai 52* (48); Fariha Trisna 2/5 (2 overs)

Bangladesh won by 34 runs
Mulpani International Cricket Ground, Kageshwari-Manohara
Umpires: Rizwan Akram (Ned) and Sue Redfern (Eng)
Player of the match: Shorna Akter (Ban)

- Bangladesh won the toss and elected to bat.

== Group stage ==
The group stage featured a total of 20 matches played from 18 to 26 January 2026 across the two venues. The top three teams from each group: Bangladesh, Ireland and the United States from group A and the Netherlands, Scotland and Thailand from group B advanced to the Super 6 stage.

Group A	Group B
Bangladesh; Ireland; Namibia; Papua New Guinea; United States	Netherlands; Nepal; Scotland; Thailand; Zimbabwe

=== Group A ===
Group A standings
Pos	Team	Pld	W	L	NR	Pts	NRR	Qualification
1	Bangladesh	4	4	0	0	8	1.750	Advanced to the Super 6 stage
2	Ireland	4	3	1	0	6	1.165	Advanced to the Super 6 stage
3	United States	4	2	2	0	4	−0.209	Advanced to the Super 6 stage
4	Papua New Guinea	4	1	3	0	2	−1.025	Eliminated
5	Namibia	4	0	4	0	0	−1.669	Eliminated

Source: ESPNcricinfo

Match 2
18 January 2026
09:00 UTC+5:45
Scorecard

Bangladesh; 158/5 (20 overs)	v	United States; 137/9 (20 overs)
Sharmin Akhter 63 (39); Maahi Madhavan 3/23 (4 overs)		Chetna Pagydyala 36 (31); Nahida Akter 4/24 (4 overs)

Bangladesh won by 21 runs
Mulpani International Cricket Ground, Kageshwari-Manohara
Umpires: Buddhi Pradhan (Nep) and Sue Redfern (Eng)
Player of the match: Sharmin Akhter (Ban)

- United States won the toss and elected to field.
- Juairiya Ferdous (Ban) made her T20I debut.

Match 4
18 January 2026
13:00 UTC+5:45
Scorecard

Ireland; 146/6 (20 overs)	v	Papua New Guinea; 105/6 (20 overs)
Orla Prendergast 56 (44); Hane Tau 4/25 (4 overs)		Hollan Doriga 19 (28); Arlene Kelly 2/18 (3 overs)

Ireland won by 41 runs
Mulpani International Cricket Ground, Kageshwari-Manohara
Umpires: Rizwan Akram (Ned) and Saleema Imtiaz (Pak)
Player of the match: Orla Prendergast (Ire)

- Ireland won the toss and elected to bat.

Match 5
20 January 2026
09:00 UTC+5:45
Scorecard

Bangladesh; 168/5 (20 overs)	v	Papua New Guinea; 138/9 (20 overs)
Shorna Akter 37 (14); Dika Lohia 1/25 (3 overs)		Brenda Tau 35 (32); Shorna Akter 1/6 (1 over)

Bangladesh won by 30 runs
Tribhuvan University International Cricket Ground, Kirtipur
Umpires: Sarah Dambanevana (Zim) and Vijaya Mallela (USA)
Player of the match: Shorna Akter (Ban)

- Papua New Guinea won the toss and elected to field.

Match 8
20 January 2026
13:00 UTC+5:45
Scorecard

Namibia; 144/6 (20 overs)	v	United States; 145/6 (19.2 overs)
Yasmeen Khan 74 (47); Tara Norris 3/34 (4 overs)		Ella Claridge 70 (51); Eveleen Kejarukua 2/25 (4 overs)

United States won by 4 wickets
Mulpani International Cricket Ground, Kageshwari-Manohara
Umpires: Rizwan Akram (Ned) and Jonathan Kennedy (Ire)
Player of the match: Ella Claridge (USA)

- United States won the toss and elected to field.

Match 9
22 January 2026
09:00 UTC+5:45
Scorecard

Ireland; 154/7 (20 overs)	v	United States; 138/8 (20 overs)
Leah Paul 67 (52); Tara Norris 3/10 (4 overs)		Ritu Singh 41 (30); Arlene Kelly 4/20 (4 overs)

Ireland won by 16 runs
Mulpani International Cricket Ground, Kageshwari-Manohara
Umpires: Shivani Mishra (Qat) and Sue Redfern (Eng)
Player of the match: Leah Paul (Ire)

- Ireland won the toss and elected to bat.

Match 11
22 January 2026
13:00 UTC+5:45
Scorecard

Bangladesh; 144/7 (20 overs)	v	Namibia; 64 (17.5 overs)
Sobhana Mostary 27 (23); Sylvia Shihepo 2/21 (4 overs)		Sune Wittmann 19 (24); Sanjida Akter Meghla 4/14 (4 overs)

Bangladesh won by 80 runs
Tribhuvan University International Cricket Ground, Kirtipur
Umpires: Saleema Imtiaz (Pak) and Vijaya Mallela (USA)
Player of the match: Sanjida Akter Meghla (Ban)

- Namibia won the toss and elected to field.

Match 14
24 January 2026
09:00 UTC+5:45
Scorecard

Namibia; 122/5 (20 overs)	v	Papua New Guinea; 124/7 (19.4 overs)
Jurriene Diergaardt 36 (41); Sibona Jimmy 2/18 (2 overs)		Hollan Doriga 39 (25); Sylvia Shihepo 3/8 (4 overs)

Papua New Guinea won by 3 wickets
Mulpani International Cricket Ground, Kageshwari-Manohara
Umpires: Sarah Dambanevana (Zim) and Saleema Imtiaz (Pak)
Player of the match: Hollan Doriga (PNG)

- Namibia won the toss and elected to bat.

Match 16
24 January 2026
13:00 UTC+5:45
Scorecard

Bangladesh; 153/7 (20 overs)	v	Ireland; 144/4 (20 overs)
Sharmin Akhter 52 (45); Jane Maguire 2/24 (4 overs)		Gaby Lewis 73 (58); Shorna Akter 2/17 (2 overs)

Bangladesh won by 9 runs
Mulpani International Cricket Ground, Kageshwari-Manohara
Umpires: Vijaya Mallela (USA) and Shivani Mishra (Qat)
Player of the match: Sharmin Akhter (Ban)

- Bangladesh won the toss and elected to bat.

Match 18
26 January 2026
09:00 UTC+5:45
Scorecard

Papua New Guinea; 110/5 (20 overs)	v	United States; 111/5 (18 overs)
Konio Oala 41 (40); Lekha Shetty 3/27 (4 overs)		Gargi Bhogle 35 (39); Dika Lohia 2/7 (2 overs)

United States won by 5 wickets
Mulpani International Cricket Ground, Kageshwari-Manohara
Umpires: Shathira Jakir (Ban) and Kerrin Klaaste (SA)
Player of the match: Lekha Shetty (USA)

- Papua New Guinea won the toss and elected to bat.

Match 19
26 January 2026
13:00 UTC+5:45
Scorecard

Namibia; 107/8 (20 overs)	v	Ireland; 110/2 (14.2 overs)
Kayleen Green 32 (23); Lara McBride 3/17 (4 overs)		Orla Prendergast 39* (28); Wilka Mwatile 1/8 (3 overs)

Ireland won by 8 wickets
Tribhuvan University International Cricket Ground, Kirtipur
Umpires: Saleema Imtiaz (Pak) and Sue Redfern (Eng)
Player of the match: Orla Prendergast (Ire)

- Namibia won the toss and elected to bat.

=== Group B ===
Group B standings
Pos	Team	Pld	W	L	NR	Pts	NRR	Qualification
1	Netherlands	4	4	0	0	8	0.600	Advanced to the Super 6 stage
2	Scotland	4	3	1	0	6	2.045	Advanced to the Super 6 stage
3	Thailand	4	2	2	0	4	−0.424	Advanced to the Super 6 stage
4	Nepal (H)	4	1	3	0	2	−1.151	Eliminated
5	Zimbabwe	4	0	4	0	0	−0.942	Eliminated

Source: ESPNcricinfo
(H) Hosts

Match 1
18 January 2026
09:00 UTC+5:45
Scorecard

Nepal; 122 (20 overs)	v	Thailand; 125/2 (16.5 overs)
Bindu Rawal 44 (56); Thipatcha Putthawong 4/27 (4 overs)		Natthakan Chantham 57* (39); Sita Rana Magar 2/20 (4 overs)

Thailand won by 8 wickets
Tribhuvan University International Cricket Ground, Kirtipur
Umpires: Shathira Jakir (Ban) and Jonathan Kennedy (Ire)
Player of the match: Natthakan Chantham (Tha)

- Thailand won the toss and elected to field.

Match 3
18 January 2026
13:00 UTC+5:45
Scorecard

Netherlands; 122 (19 overs)	v	Zimbabwe; 100/8 (20 overs)
Phebe Molkenboer 27 (26); Christabel Chatonzwa 5/24 (4 overs)		Nyasha Gwanzura 27 (16); Isabel van der Woning 2/4 (2 overs)

Netherlands won by 22 runs
Tribhuvan University International Cricket Ground, Kirtipur
Umpires: Kerrin Klaaste (SA) and Vijaya Mallela (USA)
Player of the match: Christabel Chatonzwa (Zim)

- Zimbabwe won the toss and elected to field.
- Christabel Chatonzwa (Zim) took her maiden five-wicket haul in WT20Is.

Match 6
20 January 2026
09:00 UTC+5:45
Scorecard

Thailand; 115/7 (20 overs)	v	Zimbabwe; 114/6 (20 overs)
Nannapat Koncharoenkai 54 (52); Audrey Mazvishaya 2/21 (4 overs)		Modester Mupachikwa 36 (39); Thipatcha Putthawong 2/27 (4 overs)

Thailand won by 1 run
Mulpani International Cricket Ground, Kageshwari-Manohara
Umpires: Shathira Jakir (Ban) and Shivani Mishra (Qat)
Player of the match: Nannapat Koncharoenkai (Tha)

- Zimbabwe won the toss and elected to field.

Match 7
20 January 2026
13:00 UTC+5:45
Scorecard

Netherlands; 157/6 (20 overs)	v	Scotland; 150/5 (20 overs)
Sterre Kalis 87* (60); Rachel Slater 3/24 (4 overs)		Kathryn Bryce 42 (40); Caroline de Lange 2/27 (4 overs)

Netherlands won by 7 runs
Tribhuvan University International Cricket Ground, Kirtipur
Umpires: Buddhi Pradhan (Nep) and Sue Redfern (Eng)
Player of the match: Sterre Kalis (Ned)

- Netherlands won the toss and elected to bat.

Match 10
22 January 2026
09:00 UTC+5:45
Scorecard

Netherlands; 140/5 (20 overs)	v	Nepal; 138/7 (20 overs)
Babette de Leede 49 (47); Rubina Chhetry 2/21 (3 overs)		Rubina Chhetry 37* (32); Isabel van der Woning 3/16 (3 overs)

Netherlands won by 2 runs
Tribhuvan University International Cricket Ground, Kirtipur
Umpires: Sarah Dambanevana (Zim) and Kerrin Klaaste (SA)
Player of the match: Isabel van der Woning (Ned)

- Netherlands won the toss and elected to bat.

Match 12
22 January 2026
13:00 UTC+5:45
Scorecard

Zimbabwe; 101 (18.4 overs)	v	Scotland; 105/5 (13.4 overs)
Modester Mupachikwa 30* (40); Abtaha Maqsood 2/14 (3 overs)		Katherine Fraser 44 (30); Loreen Tshuma 3/25 (3.4 overs)

Scotland won by 5 wickets
Mulpani International Cricket Ground, Kageshwari-Manohara
Umpires: Jonathan Kennedy (Ire) and Buddhi Pradhan (Nep)
Player of the match: Kathryn Bryce (Sco)

- Zimbabwe won the toss and elected to bat.

Match 13
24 January 2026
09:00 UTC+5:45
Scorecard

Thailand; 118/6 (20 overs)	v	Scotland; 124/5 (14.4 overs)
Naruemol Chaiwai 73* (55); Katherine Fraser 2/25 (4 overs)		Sarah Bryce 52* (35); Suleeporn Laomi 3/39 (3.4 overs)

Scotland won by 5 wickets
Tribhuvan University International Cricket Ground, Kirtipur
Umpires: Rizwan Akram (Ned) and Shathira Jakir (Ban)
Player of the match: Sarah Bryce (Sco)

- Scotland won the toss and elected to field.

Match 15
24 January 2026
13:00 UTC+5:45
Scorecard

Zimbabwe; 129/6 (20 overs)	v	Nepal; 133/4 (19.3 overs)
Kelis Ndhlovu 52* (36); Riya Sharma 2/25 (4 overs)		Puja Mahato 52* (50); Josephine Nkomo 2/28 (3.3 overs)

Nepal won by 6 wickets
Tribhuvan University International Cricket Ground, Kirtipur
Umpires: Jonathan Kennedy (Ire) and Kerrin Klaaste (SA)
Player of the match: Puja Mahato (Nep)

- Nepal won the toss and elected to field.

Match 17
26 January 2026
09:00 UTC+5:45
Scorecard

Scotland; 140 (20 overs)	v	Nepal; 68 (13.5 overs)
Priyanaz Chatterji 45* (28); Manisha Upadhayay 4/17 (4 overs)		Roma Thapa 14* (11); Abtaha Maqsood 3/14 (4 overs)

Scotland won by 72 runs
Tribhuvan University International Cricket Ground, Kirtipur
Umpires: Rizwan Akram (Ned) and Shivani Mishra (Qat)
Player of the match: Priyanaz Chatterji (Sco)

- Nepal won the toss and elected to field.

Match 20
26 January 2026
13:00 UTC+5:45
Scorecard

Netherlands; 107/8 (20 overs)	v	Thailand; 90 (20 overs)
Babette de Leede 47 (47); Sunida Chaturongrattana 3/24 (4 overs)		Naruemol Chaiwai 33 (43); Isabel van der Woning 4/14 (4 overs)

Netherlands won by 17 runs
Mulpani International Cricket Ground, Kageshwari-Manohara
Umpires: Shathira Jakir (Ban) and Buddhi Pradhan (Nep)
Player of the match: Isabel van der Woning (Ned)

- Thailand won the toss and elected to field.

== Super 6 stage ==
The Super 6 stage featured 9 matches played from 28 January to 1 February 2026 across the two venues. The top four teams from the stage: Bangladesh, Ireland, Scotland and the Netherlands qualified for the 2026 T20 World Cup.

Qualification		Super 6 stage		
Advanced from the group stage (Top 3 teams from each group)	A	Bangladesh	Ireland	United States
Advanced from the group stage (Top 3 teams from each group)	B	Netherlands	Scotland	Thailand

=== Points table ===
Super 6 stage standings
Pos	Team	Pld	W	L	NR	Pts	NRR	Qualification
1	Bangladesh	5	5	0	0	10	1.886	Qualified for the 2026 Women's T20 World Cup
2	Ireland	5	3	2	0	6	1.280	Qualified for the 2026 Women's T20 World Cup
3	Scotland	5	3	2	0	6	0.292	Qualified for the 2026 Women's T20 World Cup
4	Netherlands	5	3	2	0	6	−0.836	Qualified for the 2026 Women's T20 World Cup
5	United States	5	1	4	0	2	−0.772	Eliminated
6	Thailand	5	0	5	0	0	−1.883	Eliminated

Source: ESPNcricinfo

=== Fixtures ===
Match 21
28 January 2026
09:00 UTC+5:45
Scorecard

Scotland; 160/5 (20 overs)	v	Ireland; 121 (19.2 overs)
Sarah Bryce 47 (31); Jane Maguire 2/20 (4 overs)		Gaby Lewis 41 (37); Kathryn Bryce 4/21 (4 overs)

Scotland won by 39 runs
Tribhuvan University International Cricket Ground, Kirtipur
Umpires: Rizwan Akram (Ned) and Shathira Jakir (Ban)
Player of the match: Kathryn Bryce (Sco)

- Ireland won the toss and elected to field.

Match 22
28 January 2026
09:00 UTC+5:45
Scorecard

Bangladesh; 165/8 (20 overs)	v	Thailand; 126/8 (20 overs)
Sobhana Mostary 59 (42); Thipatcha Putthawong 3/22 (4 overs)		Natthakan Chantham 46 (41); Marufa Akter 3/25 (4 overs)

Bangladesh won by 39 runs
Mulpani International Cricket Ground, Kageshwari-Manohara
Umpires: Saleema Imtiaz (Pak) and Jonathan Kennedy (Ire)
Player of the match: Sobhana Mostary (Ban)

- Thailand won the toss and elected to field.

Match 23
28 January 2026
13:00 UTC+5:45
Scorecard

United States; 129/7 (20 overs)	v	Netherlands; 90/2 (12 overs)
Gargi Bhogle 36 (37); Hannah Landheer 3/30 (4 overs)		Phebe Molkenboer 46* (43); Ritu Singh 1/16 (4 overs)

Netherlands won by 21 runs (DLS method)
Tribhuvan University International Cricket Ground, Kirtipur
Umpires: Kerrin Klaaste (SA) and Sue Redfern (Eng)
Player of the match: Heather Siegers (Ned)

- United States won the toss and elected to bat.
- No further play was possible due to rain.

Match 24
30 January 2026
09:00 UTC+5:45
Scorecard

Bangladesh; 191/5 (20 overs)	v	Scotland; 101/9 (20 overs)
Nigar Sultana 56* (35); Katherine Fraser 1/39 (4 overs)		Pippa Sproul 27* (23); Marufa Akter 3/25 (4 overs)

Bangladesh won by 90 runs
Tribhuvan University International Cricket Ground, Kirtipur
Umpires: Kerrin Klaaste (SA) and Vijaya Mallela (USA)
Player of the match: Nigar Sultana (Ban)

- Bangladesh won the toss and elected to bat.
- Pippa Sproul (Sco) made her T20I debut.

Match 25
30 January 2026
09:00 UTC+5:45
Scorecard

Ireland; 143/9 (20 overs)	v	Netherlands; 45 (14.5 overs)
Leah Paul 39 (24); Hannah Landheer 3/35 (4 overs)		Iris Zwilling 10 (12); Jane Maguire 3/9 (2.5 overs)

Ireland won by 98 runs
Mulpani International Cricket Ground, Kageshwari-Manohara
Umpires: Sarah Dambanevana (Zim) and Shivani Mishra (Qat)
Player of the match: Orla Prendergast (Ire)

- Netherlands won the toss and elected to field.

Match 26
30 January 2026
13:00 UTC+5:45
Scorecard

United States; 128 (19.5 overs)	v	Thailand; 100 (19 overs)
Pooja Ganesh 35* (25); Onnicha Kamchomphu 3/16 (4 overs)		Naruemol Chaiwai 31 (35); Tara Norris 3/22 (4 overs)

United States won by 28 runs
Mulpani International Cricket Ground, Kageshwari-Manohara
Umpires: Saleema Imtiaz (Pak) and Buddhi Pradhan (Nep)
Player of the match: Tara Norris (USA)

- United States won the toss and elected to bat.

Match 27
1 January 2026
09:00 UTC+5:45
Scorecard

Ireland; 121/8 (20 overs)	v	Thailand; 59 (16.1 overs)
Gaby Lewis 25 (30); Suleeporn Laomi 4/24 (4 overs)		Naruemol Chaiwai 22 (37); Arlene Kelly 4/7 (4 overs)

Ireland won by 62 runs
Tribhuvan University International Cricket Ground, Kirtipur
Umpires: Sarah Dambanevana (Zim) and Buddhi Pradhan (Nep)
Player of the match: Arlene Kelly (Ire)

- Ireland won the toss and elected to bat.
- Thanrada Seesawan (Tha) made her T20I debut.

Match 28
1 January 2026
09:00 UTC+5:45
Scorecard

Netherlands; 102/6 (20 overs)	v	Bangladesh; 105/3 (16.4 overs)
Sanya Khurana 43* (37); Nahida Akter 3/10 (4 overs)		Nigar Sultana 50* (44); Heather Siegers 1/9 (3 overs)

Bangladesh won by 7 wickets
Mulpani International Cricket Ground, Kageshwari-Manohara
Umpires: Jonathan Kennedy (Ire) and Sue Redfern (Eng)
Player of the match: Nahida Akter (Ban)

- Netherlands won the toss and elected to bat.

Match 29
1 January 2026
13:00 UTC+5:45
Scorecard

Scotland; 178/8 (20 overs)	v	United States; 137 (19 overs)
Darcey Carter 52 (34); Tara Norris 4/33 (4 overs)		Ella Claridge 35 (26); Priyanaz Chatterji 2/11 (2 overs)

Scotland won by 41 runs
Tribhuvan University International Cricket Ground, Kirtipur
Umpires: Rizwan Akram (Ned) and Shivani Mishra (Qat)
Player of the match: Darcey Carter (Sco)

- Scotland won the toss and elected to bat.

== Statistics ==
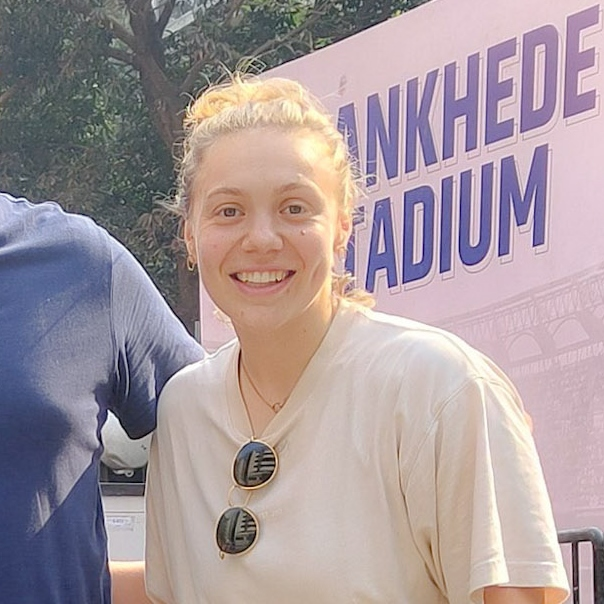
Tara Norris of the United States took the most wickets in the 2026 tournament (15 wickets from 6 innings).

Gaby Lewis of Ireland scored the most runs in the 2026 tournament (276 runs from 7 innings), which was also the most in a single tournament. Tara Norris of the United States took the most wickets in the 2026 tournament (15 wickets from 6 innings), which was also the most in a single tournament.

Most runs
Runs	Player	Team
276	Gaby Lewis	Ireland
262	Sobhana Mostary	Bangladesh
205	Naruemol Chaiwai	Thailand
195	Sharmin Akhter	Bangladesh
184	Katherine Fraser	Scotland

Most wickets
Wickets	Player	Team
15	Tara Norris	United States
13	Arlene Kelly	Ireland
13	Thipatcha Putthawong	Thailand
12	Kathryn Bryce	Scotland
11	Jane Maguire	Ireland

== See also ==
- International cricket in 2025–26
- Associate international cricket in 2025–26
- 2026 Men's T20 World Cup
- 2026 Men's T20 World Cup final
- 2026 Men's T20 World Cup qualification
- 2026 Men's T20 World Cup squads
- International cricket in 2026
- Associate international cricket in 2026
