= 2023 Nepal T20I Tri-Nation Series =

International cricket tournament

2023 Nepal Tri-Nation Series
- Date: 18–27 October 2023
- Location: Nepal
- Result: United Arab Emirates won the tournament.
- Player of the series: (Nepal) Karan KC
Teams
Hong Kong	Nepal	United Arab Emirates
Captains
Nizakat Khan	Rohit Paudel	Muhammad Waseem
Most runs
Babar Hayat (151)	Aasif Sheikh (154)	Basil Hameed (159)
Most wickets
Ehsan Khan (5)	Karan KC (10)	Zahoor Khan (6)

The 2023 Nepal Tri-Nation Series was a Twenty20 International cricket tournament, took place in October 2023 in Nepal. The participating teams were Nepal, Hong Kong and the United Arab Emirates. The tournament formed part of all the three teams' preparations for the Asia World Cup Qualifier.

The tournament was played in a double round-robin format, followed by a final between the top two sides. The group matches were played at the Mulpani Cricket Stadium in Kageshwari-Manohara, and the final was played at the Tribhuvan University International Cricket Ground in Kirtipur.

The UAE defeated Nepal by 6 wickets in the final. Karan KC of Nepal was named player of the tournament.

== Squads ==
Hong Kong	Nepal	United Arab Emirates
Nizakat Khan (c); Zeeshan Ali; Haroon Arshad; Martin Coetzee; Mohammad Ghazanfar; Adit Gorawara; Babar Hayat; Raag Kapur; Aizaz Khan; Ehsan Khan; Scott McKechnie; Yasim Murtaza; Anshuman Rath; Nasrulla Rana; Ayush Shukla	Rohit Paudel (c); Aasif Sheikh (wk); Dipendra Singh Airee; Lokesh Bam; Kushal Bhurtel; Binod Bhandari (wk); Avinash Bohara; Sagar Dhakal; Mousom Dhakal; Pratis GC; Gulsan Jha; Sundeep Jora; Sompal Kami; Karan KC; Kushal Malla; Lalit Rajbanshi; Surya Tamang; Bibek Yadav	Muhammad Waseem (c); Mohammed Faraazuddin; Jash Giyanani; Basil Hameed; Muhammad Jawadullah; Nilansh Keswani; Aayan Afzal Khan; Asif Khan; Zahoor Khan; Ali Naseer; Akif Raja; Khalid Shah (wk); Alishan Sharafu; Aryansh Sharma; Sanchit Sharma; Junaid Siddique

== Round robin ==
=== Points table ===
Pos	Team	Pld	W	L	NR	Pts	NRR	
1	Nepal (H)	4	4	0	0	8	1.975	Advanced to the final
2	United Arab Emirates	4	1	3	0	2	−0.879	Advanced to the final
3	Hong Kong	4	1	3	0	2	−1.102	

Source: ESPNcricinfo
(H) Host

=== Fixtures ===
18 October 2023
13:00
Scorecard

United Arab Emirates; 140/7 (20 overs)	v	Nepal; 144/3 (18.5 overs)
Basil Hameed 51 (38); Karan KC 3/19 (4 overs)		Rohit Paudel 51* (40); Nilansh Keswani 1/27 (4 overs)

Nepal won by 7 wickets
Mulpani International Cricket Ground, Kageshwari-Manohara
Umpires: Vinay Kumar Jha (Nep) and Durga Subedi (Nep)
Player of the match: Rohit Paudel (Nep)

- Nepal won the toss and elected to field.
- This was the first T20I match to be played at this venue.
- Mousom Dhakal (Nep) and Khalid Shah (UAE) both made their T20I debuts.

19 October 2023
11:00
Scorecard

Hong Kong; 94 (19.3 overs)	v	Nepal; 99/4 (13.5 overs)
Yasim Murtaza 36 (36); Karan KC 4/15 (4 overs)		Aasif Sheikh 42 (34); Ehsan Khan 3/10 (4 overs)

Nepal won by 6 wickets
Mulpani International Cricket Ground, Kageshwari-Manohara
Umpires: Sanjay Gurung (Nep) and Vinay Kumar Jha (Nep)
Player of the match: Karan KC (Nep)

- Nepal won the toss and elected to field.
- Martin Coetzee (HK) made his T20I debut.

21 October 2023
11:00
Scorecard

Nepal; 213/6 (20 overs)	v	Hong Kong; 134/8 (20 overs)
Kushal Malla 92 (41); Haroon Arshad 2/39 (4 overs)		Anshy Rath 45 (42); Lalit Rajbanshi 2/18 (3 overs)

Nepal won by 79 runs
Mulpani International Cricket Ground, Kageshwari-Manohara
Umpires: Sanjay Gurung (Nep) and Durga Subedi (Nep)
Player of the match: Kushal Malla (Nep)

- Nepal won the toss and elected to bat.
- Pratis GC (Nep) made his T20I debut.

22 October 2023
11:00
Scorecard

Hong Kong; 149/5 (20 overs)	v	United Arab Emirates; 153/4 (18 overs)
Babar Hayat 66 (45); Zahoor Khan 3/21 (4 overs)		Muhammad Waseem 40 (17); Yasim Murtaza 2/20 (4 overs)

United Arab Emirates won by 6 wickets
Mulpani International Cricket Ground, Kageshwari-Manohara
Umpires: Vinay Kumar Jha (Nep) and Durga Subedi (Nep)
Player of the match: Zahoor Khan (UAE)

- United Arab Emirates won the toss and elected to field.
- Jash Giyanani (UAE) made his T20I debut.

23 October 2023
11:00
Scorecard

United Arab Emirates; 164/7 (20 overs)	v	Nepal; 165/5 (19.2 overs)
Basil Hameed 45 (19); Abinash Bohara 2/28 (4 overs)		Aasif Sheikh 62 (50); Muhammad Jawadullah 2/27 (4 overs)

Nepal won by 5 wickets
Mulpani International Cricket Ground, Kageshwari-Manohara
Umpires: Sanjay Gurung (Nep) and Durga Subedi (Nep)
Player of the match: Dipendra Singh Airee (Nep)

- Nepal won the toss and elected to field.

25 October 2023
13:00
Scorecard

Hong Kong; 212/3 (20 overs)	v	United Arab Emirates; 143/5 (20 overs)
Martin Coetzee 86 (55); Nilansh Keswani 1/13 (4 overs)		Khalid Shah 35 (25); Yasim Murtaza 1/9 (4 overs)

Hong Kong won by 69 runs
Mulpani International Cricket Ground, Kageshwari-Manohara
Umpires: Sanjay Gurung (Nep) and Durga Subedi (Nep)
Player of the match: Babar Hayat (HK)

- Hong Kong won the toss and elected to bat.

== Final ==
27 October 2023
11:00
Scorecard

Nepal; 162/8 (20 overs)	v	United Arab Emirates; 167/6 (19.5 overs)
Kushal Bhurtel 50 (29); Aayan Afzal Khan 3/19 (4 overs)		Muhammad Waseem 45 (22); Gulsan Jha 2/19 (3 overs)

United Arab Emirates won by 4 wickets
Tribhuvan University International Cricket Ground, Kirtipur
Umpires: Vinay Kumar Jha (Nep) and Durga Subedi (Nep)
Player of the match: Aayan Afzal Khan (UAE)

- United Arab Emirates won the toss and elected to field.
