= Mulpani International Cricket Ground =

Cricket Ground in Nepal

- Jayakumar Shah International Cricket Ground
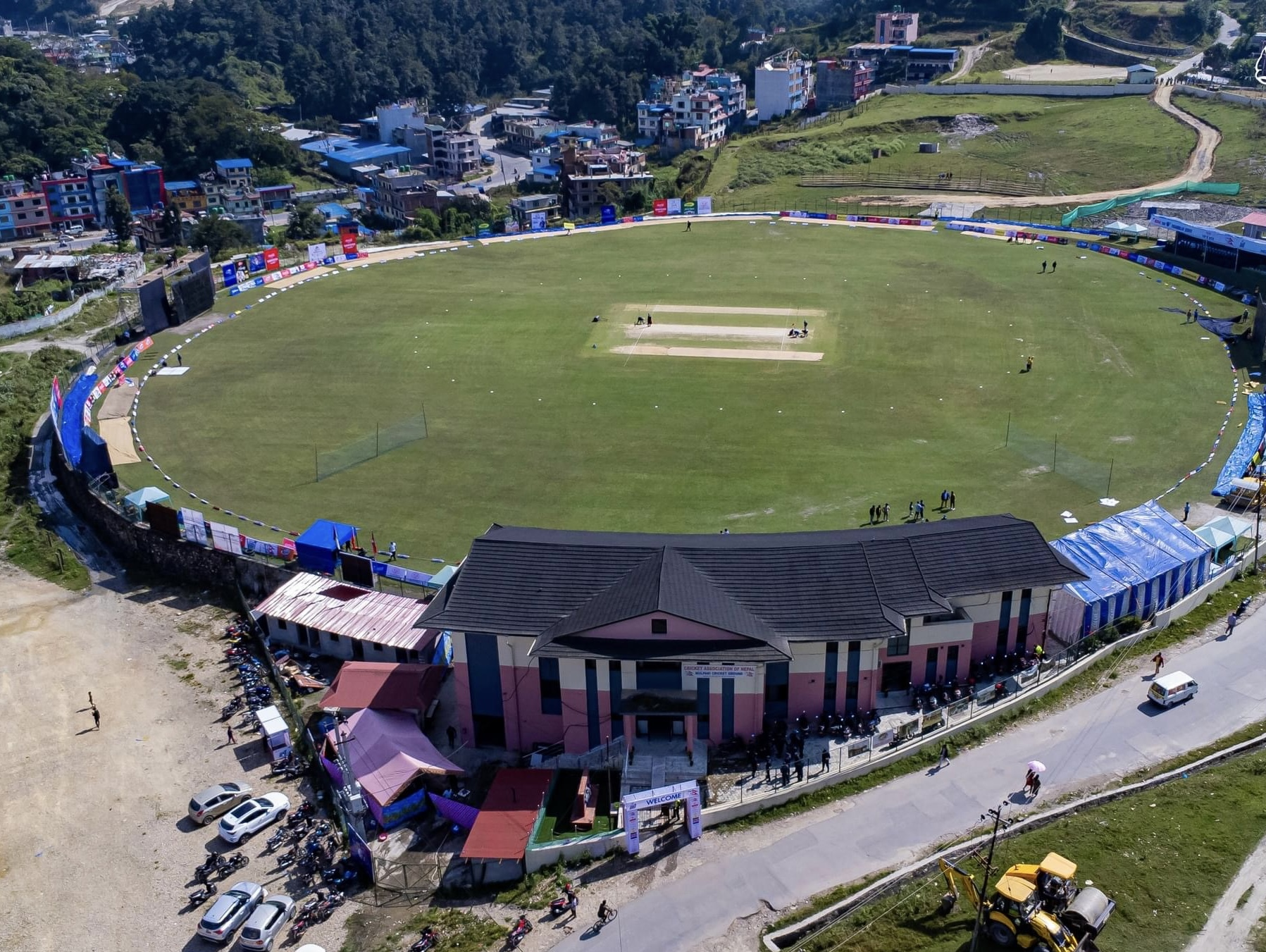
- Upper Mulpani Cricket Ground during 2023 Nepal T20I Tri-Nation Series
- Interactive map of Mulpani International Cricket Ground

Ground information
- Location: Mulpani, Kathmandu, Nepal
- Country: Nepal
- Coordinates: 27°43′06.9″N 85°23′29″E
- Establishment: 2022; 4 years ago
- Capacity: 4000; 13,000 (planned)
- Owner: Cricket Association of Nepal
- Operator: Cricket Association of Nepal
- Tenants: Nepal national cricket team Nepal A cricket team Nepal national under-19 cricket team
- End names
- Forest End; City End

International information
- Only men's ODI: 29 April 2023: Oman v United Arab Emirates
- First men's T20I: 18 October 2023: Nepal v United Arab Emirates
- Last men's T20I: 3 November 2023: Nepal v United Arab Emirates
- First women's T20I: 18 January 2026: Bangladesh v United States
- Last women's T20I: 1 February 2026: Bangladesh v Netherlands

Team information
Nepal cricket team
- As of 17 March 2025; Source: espncricinfo

The Mulpani International Cricket Ground, Commonly known as Upper Mulpani Cricket Ground or simply Mulpani Ground (Nepali: मुलपानी अन्तर्राष्ट्रिय क्रिकेट मैदान) is a cricket ground in Mulpani, Kathmandu, Nepal.

In a recent decision made at the Cricket Association of Nepal (CAN) meeting, the Ground has been officially renamed in honor of the late former CAN President, Jayakumar Nath Shah. The ground will now be known as the Jayakumar Shah International Cricket Ground.

== Construction ==
Cricket Association of Nepal had initiated to construct two grounds in Mulpani after the Asian Cricket Council's plan to build its central cricket academy in the current Mulpani venue didn't materialise.

In 2011, the stadium received रु 30 million for its construction from Ministry of Youth and Sports as well as CAN signed a contract with Gaura Construction Pvt. Ltd.

In 2013, National Sports Council allocated around रु 45 million from the sports budget for a second cricket ground in Mulpani.

In 2014, the stadium is allocated a separate रु 200 million for its construction in the 2014/15 budget presented by the Finance Minister.

In 2019, the construction work of the Mulpani Cricket Stadium will gain momentum as the land dispute has been resolved.National Sports Council has demanded रु 400 million from the government for the completion of the stadium. After completion, the 40,000-people capacity stadium will have an administrative block, swimming pool, academia and its practice ground, hostel and other facilities.

In 2022, construction of a new stadium began after almost 5 years delay.

== History ==
In 2023, it was selected as one of the venues for hosting 2023 Men's Premier Cup along with Tribhuvan University International Cricket Ground. In April 2023, ground hosted its first One Day International match between Oman and UAE. It became 216th venue in the world to host an ODI match and second venue after Tribhuvan University International Cricket Ground to host ODI match in Nepal. On 18 October 2023, it became 190th venue in the world to host a T20I match. And on 18 January 2026, it became 261th venue in the world to host women's t20i matches.

== Records and stats ==
=== Matches hosted ===
Format	Test	ODI	T20I	WT20I	WODI
Matches		2	26	28	
As of 02 Feb 2026 (Source)

=== ODI records ===
- Highest ODI total: 236/10 – United Arab Emirates vs. Oman, 2023 ACC Men's Premier Cup (2nd Semi Final), 19 April 2023
- Highest Individual ODI Score: 49 – Kashyap Prajapati, Oman vs. United Arab Emirates, 2023 ACC Men's Premier Cup (2nd Semi Final), 19 April 2023
- Best ODI Bowling Figure: 4/32 – Zeeshan Maqsood, United Arab Emirates vs Oman, 2023 ACC Men's Premier Cup (2nd Semi Final), 19 April 2020
- Highest ODI Partnership: 79 (for the 1st wicket) – Kashyap Prajapati & Jatinder Singh, Oman vs. United Arab Emirates, 2023 ACC Men's Premier Cup (2nd Semi Final), 19 April 2020

ODI Matches Record
Team	MP	W	L	T	NR
United Arab Emirates	1	1	0	0	0
Oman	1	0	1	0	0
Reference: ESPNcricinfo (As of 4 Mar 2025)

=== T20I records ===
- Highest T20I total: 213/6 – Nepal vs. Hong Kong, (3rd match) at 2023 Nepal T20I Tri-Nation Series, 21 October 2023
- Highest Individual T20I Score: 92 – Kushal Malla, Nepal vs. Hong Kong, (3rd match) at 2023 Nepal T20I Tri-Nation Series, 21 October 2023
- Best T20I Bowling Figure: 4/15 – Karan KC, Nepal vs. Hong Kong, (3rd match) at 2023 Nepal T20I Tri-Nation Series, 19 October 2023
- Highest T20I Partnership: 145 (for the 5th wicket) – Kushal Malla & Dipendra Singh Airee, Nepal vs. Hong Kong, (3rd match) at 2023 Nepal T20I Tri-Nation Series, 19 October 2023

T20I Matches Record
Team	MP	W	L	T	NR
United Arab Emirates	8	4	4	0	0
Hong Kong	7	2	5	0	0
Nepal	5	5	0	0	0
Bahrain	3	1	2	0	0
Kuwait	3	1	2	0	0
Reference: ESPNcricinfo (As of 5 Mar 2025)

=== WT20I records ===
- Highest T20I total: 165/8 – Bangladesh vs. Thailand at 2026 Women's T20 World Cup Qualifier on 28 January 2026
- Highest individual T20I score:
- Best T20I Bowling Figure:
- Highest T20I partnership:
- Most wickets in WT20I:

WT20I Matches Record
Team	MP	W	L	T	NR
United States	5	3	2	0	0
Bangladesh	4	4	0	0	0
Ireland	4	3	1	0	0
Thailand	4	1	3	0	0
Netherlands	3	1	2	0	0
Papua New Guinea	3	1	2	0	0
Namibia	2	0	2	0	0
Zimbabwe	2	0	2	0	0
Scotland	1	1	0	0	0
Reference: ESPNcricinfo (As of 14 February 2026)

== Major sports events ==
- 2023 Men's Premier Cup
- 2023 Nepal T20I Tri-Nation Series
- 2023 ICC Men's T20 World Cup Asia Regional Final
- 2026 Women's T20 World Cup Qualifier
- 2026 Nepal Tri-Nation Series
- 2026 Cricket World Cup Qualifier Play-off
- 2027 Under-19 Women's T20 World Cup
