= Mulpani Cricket Stadium =

Cricket Ground in Nepal

- Lower Mulpani Cricket Stadium
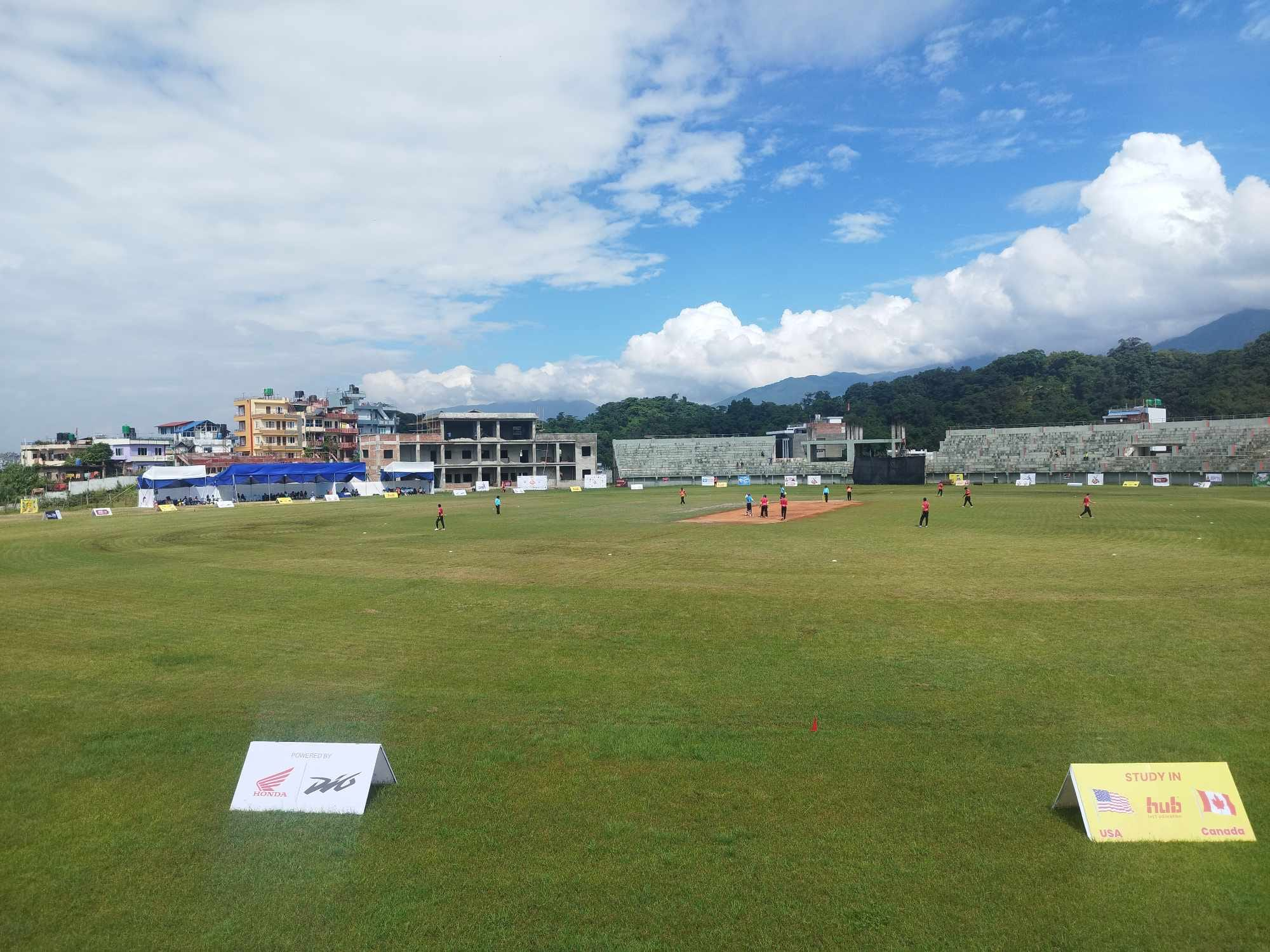
- Mulpani Cricket Stadium
- Interactive map of Mulpani Cricket Stadium
- Location: Mulpani, Kathmandu, Nepal
- Country: Nepal
- Coordinates: 27°43′15.2″N 85°23′23.5″E
- Establishment: 2022; 4 years ago
- Capacity: 20,000
- Owner: National Sports Council
- Operator: Cricket Association of Nepal
- Tenants: Nepal national cricket team Nepal A cricket team Nepal national under-19 cricket team
- End names
- Gokarna End; Mulpani End
- As of 11 December 2025; Source: espncricinfo

The Mulpani Cricket Stadium, Commonly known as Lower Mulpani Cricket Ground or simply Mulpani Ground (Nepali: मुलपानी अन्तर्राष्ट्रिय क्रिकेट रंगशाला) is a cricket ground in Mulpani, Kathmandu, Nepal.

In a historic moment for Nepali cricket, the Lower Mulpani Cricket Ground hosted its first-ever international match at any level, marking a significant milestone since its foundation stone was laid back in 2008. The long wait finally ended on April 13, 2025, as Nepal U19 faced UAE U19 in the opening game of the ICC U19 World Cup Asia Qualifier.

The ground, which had previously hosted national-level games and local tournaments, witnessed its international debut in a dramatic fashion. In a rain-affected encounter, Nepal edged past UAE by 5 runs via the DLS method, making the occasion even more memorable for local fans.

The tournament is being played across both Upper and Lower Mulpani grounds, but the spotlight firmly rested on Lower Mulpani for its maiden international outing. The venue, which had been primarily used for academy and local matches in recent years, underwent significant improvements under the Cricket Association of Nepal (CAN) to prepare for the tournament, including the construction of new pitches.

The hosting of this fixture at Lower Mulpani marks its addition to Nepal's list of international cricket venues, and represents a development in the country's cricket infrastructure.

== Construction ==
Cricket Association of Nepal had initiated to construct two grounds in Mulpani after the Asian Cricket Council's plan to build its central cricket academy in the current Mulpani venue didn't materialise.

In 2011, the stadium received रु 30 million for its construction from Ministry of Youth and Sports as well as CAN signed a contract with Gaura Construction Pvt. Ltd.

In 2013, National Sports Council allocated around रु 45 million from the sports budget for a second cricket ground in Mulpani.

In 2014, the stadium is allocated a separate रु 200 million for its construction in the 2014/15 budget presented by the Finance Minister.

In 2019, the construction work of the Mulpani Cricket Stadium will gain momentum as the land dispute has been resolved.National Sports Council has demanded रु 400 million from the government for the completion of the stadium. After completion, the 40,000-people capacity stadium will have an administrative block, swimming pool, academia and its practice ground, hostel and other facilities.

In 2022, construction of a new stadium began after almost 5 years delay.

== History ==
=== Early Beginnings & Challenges ===
The journey began in 2004, with initial aspirations to establish a world-class cricket facility in Mulpani. However, years of delays followed, making the project a symbol of stagnation despite the area's urban growth .

In 2002, the ICC proposed building a Global Cricket Academy in Nepal at Mulpani. Due to safety issues, this plan was shifted to Dubai. A later concept for an ACC Regional Cricket Academy similarly did not materialise.

=== Recent Milestones ===
Lower Mulpani Cricket Stadium hosted warm-up matches of 2026 Women's T20 World Cup Qualifier in January 2026.

== Major sports events ==
- Prime Minister Cup Women's National Cricket Tournament
- 2026 Women's T20 World Cup Qualifier
- [2027 Under-19 Women's T20 World Cup] - upcoming
