= Mulpani, Kathmandu =

Mulpani, Kathmandu मुलपानी Sunthanetar
- Village of Kageshwari-Manohara Municipality
- Nickname: Bhaimal
- Motto(s): "Hamro Mulpani, Ramro Mulpani"
- Location in Nepal
- Coordinates: 27.71°N 85.40°E
- Country: Nepal
- Province: Bagmati Province
- District: Kathmandu
- Established: About many years ago

Government
  - Type: Communist
  - Ward Chairman: Prakash Phuyal

Population (2011)
  - Total: 4,718
- 11742
- Time zone: UTC+5:45 (Nepal Time)

Mulpani is a village and former Village Development Committee that is now part of Kageshwari-Manohara Municipality in Kathmandu District in Province No. 3 of central Nepal. Mulpani was previously known as Bhaimal, meaning "no fear". At the time of the 1991 Nepal census it had a population of 4,718 living in 843 households. The main occupation of the people in the village is agriculture. Mulpani is surrounded by Bagmati and Manohara river. Mulpani is famous for the Nepal's biggest International Cricket Ground, known as Mulpani Cricket Stadium, which is under construction. In recent years, Mulpani has seen much change in its infrastructure and people as well. The main occupation in Mulpani was agriculture but now employment is more diverse.

Mulpani has raised its standards of development by youth clubs like Chakhandol Youth Club on the western side and Jhulchowk Youth Unity Club (JYUC), Manohara Mulpani Youth Club, Friends Club®, Nabintam Youth Club® and Manohara Sports Club (MASPOC) on the Eastern side.

== Well known places, streets and travel destinations around Mulpani ==
- Mulpani Cricket Stadium
- Mulpani International Cricket Ground
- Milanchwok
- Babachwok
- Mulpani Chaur
- Dumadevi temple
- Mulpani Pipalbot Buspark
