= Kushal Malla =

Nepalese cricketer (born 2004)

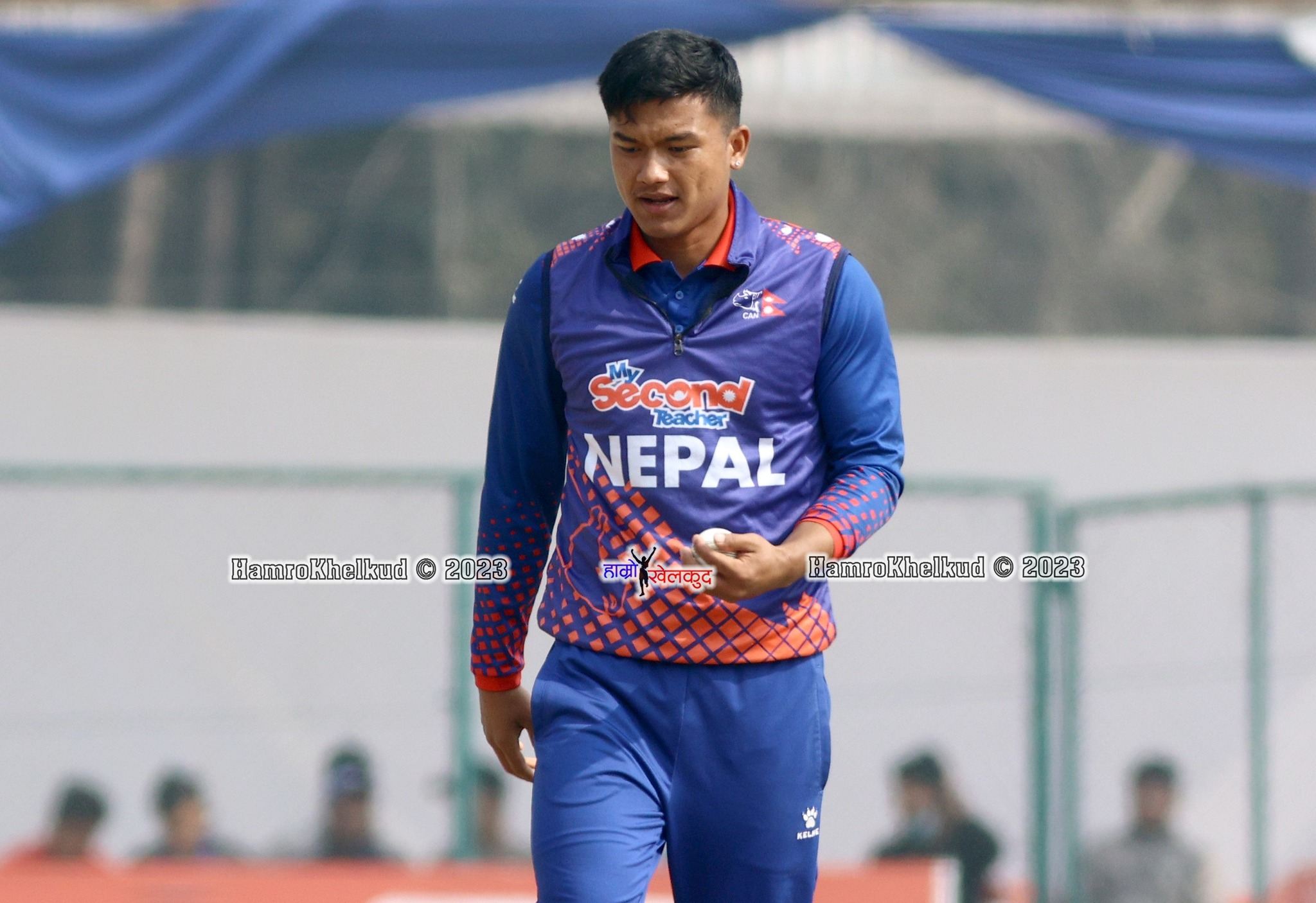

Personal information
- Full name: Kushal Malla
- Born: 5 March 2004 (age 22); Butwal, Rupandehi
- Batting: Left-handed
- Bowling: Slow left arm orthodox
- Role: Batting all-rounder

International information
- National side: Nepal
- ODI debut (cap 22): 8 February 2020 v USA
- Last ODI: 25 February 2024 v Netherlands
- T20I debut (cap 27): 1 October 2019 v Zimbabwe
- Last T20I: 14 June 2024 v South Africa

Domestic team information
- Years: Team
- 2022–present: Tribhuwan Army Club
- 2024–present: Chitwan Rhinos
- 2024–present: Desert Vipers

Career statistics
Competition	ODI	T20I
Matches	36	39
Runs scored	716	771
Batting average	24.68	29.65
100s/50s	1/4	1/4
Top score	108	137*
Balls bowled	1,063	360
Wickets	24	19
Bowling average	32.70	19.52
5 wickets in innings	0	0
10 wickets in match	0	0
Best bowling	2/6	4/33
Catches/stumpings	6/-	12/-
- Source: Cricinfo, 10 May 2024

Kushal Malla (Nepali: कुशल मल्ल pronounced [ˈkusʌl ˈmʌlːʌ]; born 5 March 2004) is a Nepalese cricketer. He is a left-handed batsman, and a left-arm off-spinner. Known for his aggressive batting, he scored the fastest century in Twenty20 Internationals, off just 34 balls, in the opening match of the 2022 Asian Games against Mongolia, a record previously held by David Miller, Rohit Sharma and Sudesh Wickramasekara (35 balls), and later broken by Jan Nicol Loftie-Eaton (33 balls).

== Career ==
In September 2019, Malla was named in Nepal's squad for the 2019–20 Singapore Tri-Nation Series and the 2019–20 Oman Pentangular Series. He made his T20I debut against Zimbabwe, in the Singapore Tri-Nation Series on 27 September 2019.

In January 2020, he was named in Nepal's One Day International (ODI) squad for the 2020 Nepal Tri-Nation Series. He made his ODI debut for Nepal, against the United States, on 8 February 2020. In the match he scored 50 runs from 51 balls, and at the age of 15 years and 340 days, he became the youngest male cricketer to score an international half-century.

In September 2020, he was one of eighteen cricketers to be awarded with a central contract by the Cricket Association of Nepal. In April 2021, in the final of the 2020–21 Nepal Tri-Nation Series, he made 50 not out, becoming the youngest cricketer to score a half-century in a T20I match.

In April 2023, Malla scored his first century in ODIs during a match against Oman. He scored the century in just 54 balls, the fastest by a Nepalese player. He is the fourth Nepalese player (after Paras Khadka, Kushal Bhurtel, and Dipendra Singh Airee) to score centuries in both T20Is and ODIs.

In September 2023, Malla scored the fastest century in T20Is off 34 balls, a record previously held by David Miller, Rohit Sharma and S Wickramasekara (35 balls). Malla set the record to score most runs in an innings in T20I without coming in as an opener.

In May 2024, he was named in Nepal's squad for the 2024 ICC Men's T20 World Cup tournament.

== Personal life ==
Malla attended New Horizon School in Butwal, Rupandehi from year 3, and currently attends Kshitiz International College on a full scholarship. He used to lived in Butwal 11 Devinagar. Currently, he lives in Chandragiri with his father and mother. He is the only son of the family.

== Franchise cricket ==
- Desert Vipers (ILT20): Malla was signed by the Desert Vipers for the International League T20 (ILT20) in the United Arab Emirates. He joined the team to replace the injured Dutch all-rounder Bas de Leede.
- Team Abu Dhabi (T10 League): Malla has played for Team Abu Dhabi in the T10 League.
- Chitwan Rhinos (Nepal Premier League): As of the 2024 Nepal Premier League, Malla is the captain of the Chitwan Rhinos franchise.
