= 2021 Prime Minister Cup =

Cricket tournament in Nepal

- Dates: 15 – 30 January 2021
- Administrator: Cricket Association of Nepal
- Cricket format: One Day
- Tournament format(s): Round-robin and Playoffs
- Host: Nepal
- Champions: Tribhuwan Army Club
- Participants: 10
- Matches: 23
- Player of the series: Kamal Airee (APF)
- Most runs: Prithu Baskota (Bagmati); 215 runs
- Most wickets: Abinash Bohara (APF); 14 wickets

The 2021 Prime Minister Cup was the fourth edition of the Prime Minister One Day Cup, the premier one-day cricket tournament in Nepal. The tournament was contested by teams representing the seven Provinces of Nepal as well as three departmental teams. It began on 15 January 2021 and ended on 30 January 2021. All matches of the tournament were broadcast live by DishHome's "Action Sports" channel. Nepal Police Club were the defending champions, but were eliminated at the semi-final stage by Armed Police Force Club. Tribhuwan Army Club won the title following a 33-run win over APF Club in the final.

== Squads ==
The ten participants were divided into two groups.

=== Group A ===
Gandaki Province	Karnali Province	Nepal APF	Province No 1	Tribhuwan Army
Bipin Khatri (c); Ashok Shrestha (vc); Subash Bhandari; Dinesh Budhamagar; Deepak Dumre; Amrit Gurung; Sameer Kandel; Deepesh Khatri; Arjun Kumal; Milan Luitel; Bishnu Pandey; Bishal Paudel; Chandra Paudel; Avishek Thapa; Rahul Upadhyaya	Rabindra Shahi (c); Dinesh Adhikari; Anuj Chunara; Rupak Dahal; Tara Prasad Giri; Hemant Oli; Lalit Pyakurel; Diwan Pun; Bipin Rawal; Nischal Rawal; Raj Shah; Himanshu Shahi; Unish Singh; Abhishek Thakuri	Sharad Vesawkar (c); Kamal Airee; Pradeep Airee; Abinash Bohara; Rit Gautam; Sundeep Jora; Bhuvan Karki; Subash Khakurel; Sumit Maharjan; Kishore Mahato; Shankar Rana; Basanta Regmi; Amar Routela; Asif Sheikh; Surya Tamang	Siddhant Lohani (c); Firdosh Ansari; Dipesh Kandel; Josak Khadka; Rajan Magar; Sonu Mandal; Bibek Meheta; Deepak Paswan; Hemant Rai; Gyanendra Shrestha; Manoj Tamang; Meenash Thapa; Shuvankar Urau; Sarwan Yadav	Binod Bhandari (c); Shahab Alam; Lokesh Bam; Sushan Bhari; Aakash Chand; Hari Chauhan; Harikrishna Jha; Anil Mandal; Jitendra Mukhiya; Rajesh Pulami; Rohit Kumar Paudel; Raju Rijal; Bhim Sharki; Bikram Sob

=== Group B ===
Bagmati Province	Lumbini Province	Nepal Police	Madhesh Province	Sudurpashchim Province
Gyanendra Malla (c); Bipin Acharya; Prithu Baskota; Tilak Bhandari; Ramnaresh Giri; Gautam KC; Paras Khadka; Aadil Khan; Ishan Pandey; Ariyo Poudel; Dipesh Shrestha; Aakash Thapa; Bibhatsu Thapa; Nandan Yadav	Krishna Karki (c); Bikram Bushal; Dev Khanal; Saurav Khanal; Anil Kharel; Panil Thapa Magar; K.C. Prakash; Sandeep Rajali; Dipendra Rawat; Jitendra Sahani; Rajbir Singh; Sandeep Sunar; Amit Tamang; Sushant Thapa	Manjeet Shrestha (c); Dipendra Singh Airee; Kushal Bhurtel; Sagar Dhakal; Sunil Dhamala; Yogendra Singh Karki; Rashid Khan; Dilip Nath; Lalit Rajbanshi; Anil Sah; Pawan Sarraf; Aarif Sheikh; Amit Shrestha; Prem Tamang	Suraj Pratap Kurmi (c); Mehboob Alam; Adil Ansari; Shaifullah Ansari; Sudhir Chaudhary; Himanshu Dutta; Divyanshu Mallick; Hari Sah; Ravi Sah; Rahul Singh; Ravi Singh; Bishal Sushling; Kumar Thapa; Bibek Yadav	Santosh Bhatta (c); Khadak Bohora (vc); Arun Airee; Bhoj Raj Bhatta; Gajendra Bohara; Sanju Damai; Hemant Dhami; Narayan Joshi; Binod Lama; Sher Malla; Suraj Nirwa; Arjun Saud; Narendra Saud; Kiran Thagunna

== Venue ==
Kirtipur, Kathmandu
TU International Cricket Ground
Capacity: 25,000+
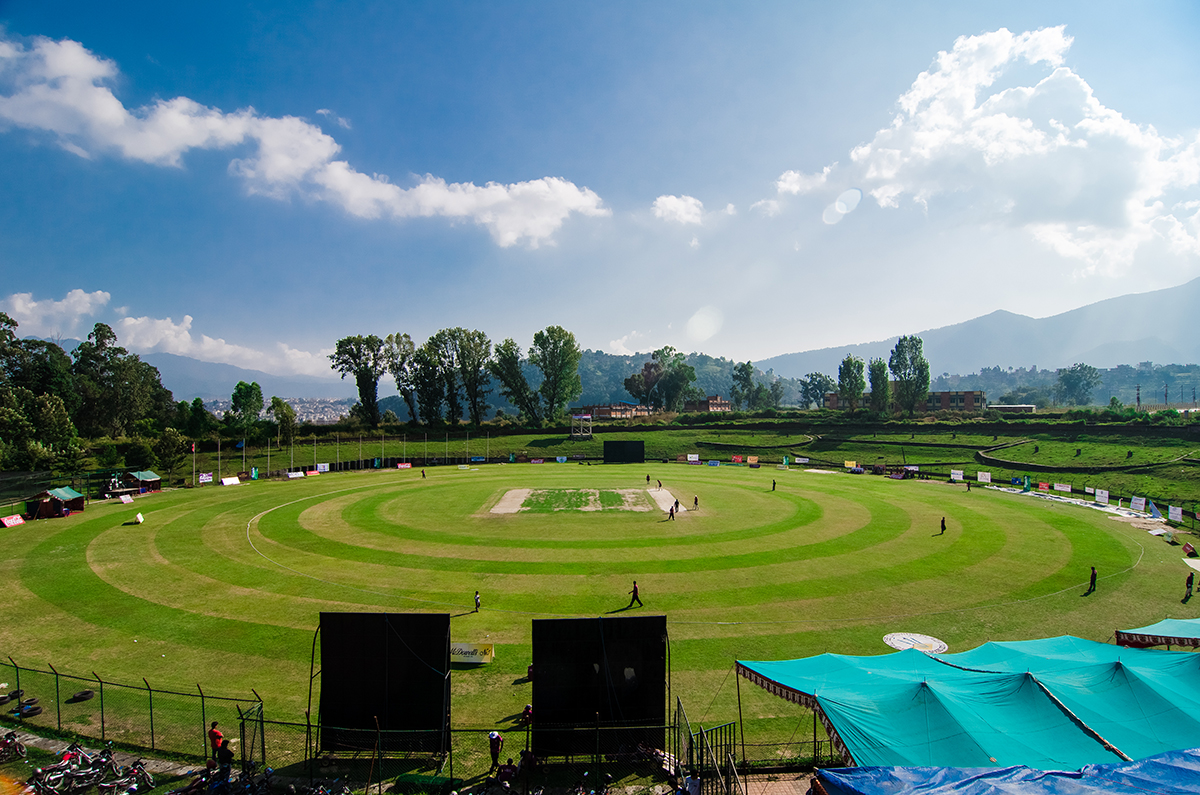
2021 Prime Minister Cup (Nepal)

== Points table ==
=== Group A ===
Team	Pld	W	L	T	NR	Pts	NRR
Armed Police Force Club	4	4	0	0	0	8	1.849
Tribhuwan Army Club	4	3	1	0	0	6	1.357
Karnali Province	4	1	3	0	0	2	–0.825
Province No. 1	4	1	3	0	0	2	–1.038
Gandaki Province	4	1	3	0	0	2	–1.323

The top two teams qualified for the playoffs.
Source: ESPNcricinfo

=== Group B ===
Team	Pld	W	L	T	NR	Pts	NRR
Bagmati Province	4	3	0	1	0	7	1.303
Nepal Police Club	4	3	1	0	0	6	1.067
Lumbini Province	4	2	1	1	0	5	0.854
Sudurpashchim Province	4	1	3	0	0	2	–2.413
Madhesh Province	4	0	4	0	0	0	–1.078

The top two teams qualified for the playoffs.
Source: ESPNcricinfo

== League matches ==
Match 1
15 January 2021
09:00
Scorecard

Tribhuwan Army Club; 287/6 (50 overs)	v	Gandaki Province; 189 (48 overs)
Binod Bhandari 111* (76); Bishal Paudel 2/57 (10 overs)		Sameer Kandel 50 (90); Rajesh Pulami Magar 5/25 (9 overs)

Tribhuwan Army Club won by 98 runs
Tribhuvan University International Cricket Ground, Kirtipur
Umpires: Buddhi Pradhan and Ram Yadav
Player of the match: Binod Bhandari (Tribhuwan Army Club)

- Tribhuwan Army Club won the toss and elected to bat.

Match 2
16 January 2021
09:00
Scorecard

Armed Police Force Club; 243 (48.4 overs)	v	Province Number 1; 108 (42.4 overs)
Aasif Sheikh 59 (32); Sarwan Yadav 2/26 (6 overs)		Meenash Thapa 18 (44); Avinash Bohara 5/18 (10 overs)

Armed Police Force Club won by 135 runs
Tribhuvan University International Cricket Ground, Kirtipur
Umpires: Himal Giri and Buddhi Pradhan
Player of the match: Avinash Bohara (Armed Police Force Club)

- Province Number 1 won the toss and elected to field.

Match 3
17 January 2021
09:00
Scorecard

Nepal Police Club; 111 (29.3 overs)	v	Bagmati Province; 113/4 (34.4 overs)
Aarif Sheikh 21 (25); Tilak Bhandari 4/17 (7.3 overs)		Prithu Baskota 48* (66); Dipendra Singh Airee 1/11 (6 overs)

Bagmati Province won by 7 wickets
Tribhuvan University International Cricket Ground, Kirtipur
Umpires: Ram Pandey and Sanjay Sigdel
Player of the match: Tilak Bhandari (Bagmati Province)

- Bagmati Province won the toss and elected to field.

Match 4
17 January 2021
09:00
Scorecard

Tribhuwan Army Club; 195 (43.1 overs)	v	Karnali Province; 115 (33.3 overs)
Anil Mandal 89 (114); Dinesh Adhikari 2/27 (7 overs)		Rabindra Shahi 30 (42); Sushan Bhari 4/19 (8.3 overs)

Tribhuwan Army Club won by 80 runs
Mulpani Cricket Stadium, Kageshwari-Manohara
Umpires: Sanjay Gurung and Kamalesh Thakur
Player of the match: Anil Mandal (Tribhuwan Army Club)

- Tribhuwan Army Club won the toss and elected to bat.

Match 5
18 January 2021
09:00
Scorecard

Bagmati Province; 299/9 (50 overs)	v	Sudurpaschim Province; 119 (21 overs)
Prithu Baskota 84 (94); Narayan Joshi 3/68 (10 overs)		Narayan Joshi 44* (29); Ramnaresh Giri 4/32 (5 overs)

Bagmati Province won by 180 runs
Tribhuvan University International Cricket Ground, Kirtipur
Umpires: Sanjay Sigdel and Kamlesh Thakur
Player of the match: Ramnaresh Giri (Bagmati Province)

- Sudur paschim Province won the toss and elected to field.

Match 6
18 January 2021
09:00
Scorecard

Province Number 1; 102 (27.4 overs)	v	Gandaki Province; 103/8 (37 overs)
Siddhant Lohani 24 (31); Bishal Paudel 4/25 (6.4 overs)		Arjun Kumal 35 (68); Minash Thapa 2/15 (7 overs)

Gandaki Province won by 2 wickets
Mulpani Cricket Stadium, Kageshwari-Manohara
Umpires: Mahesh Bohara and Ram Pandey
Player of the match: Bishal Paudel (Gandaki Province)

- Province Number 1 won the toss and elected to bat.

Match 7
19 January 2021
09:00
Scorecard

Lumbini Province; 257/9 (50 overs)	v	Madesh Province; 180 (42.4 overs)
Sandeep Rajali 83 (107); Harishankar Shah 3/48 (10 overs)		Bibek Yadav 51 (49); Anil Kharel 4/29 (10 overs)

Lumbini Province won by 77 runs
Tribhuvan University International Cricket Ground, Kirtipur
Umpires: Sanjay Sigdel and Kamlesh Thakur
Player of the match: Sandeep Rajali (Lumbini Province)

- Lumbini Province won the toss and elected to bat.

Match 8
19 January 2021
09:00
Scorecard

Gandaki Province; 204 (42.3 overs)	v	Karnali Province; 205/5 (46.5 overs)
Rahul Upadhyay 53 (64); Dinesh Adhikari 2/25 (6.3 overs)		Himanshu Shahi 68* (60); Bipin Khatri 4/55 (10 overs)

Karnali Province won by 5 wickets
Mulpani Cricket Stadium, Kageshwari-Manohara
Umpires: Buddhi Pradhan and Ram Yadav
Player of the match: Himanshu Shahi (Karnali Province)

- Gandaki Province won the toss and elected to bat.

Match 9
20 January 2021
09:00
Scorecard

Sudurpaschim Province; 110 (33.1 overs)	v	Nepal Police Club; 111/1 (17 overs)
Sanju Damai 35 (58); Dipendra Singh Airee 4/10 (6.1 overs)		Sunil Dhamala 53 (57); Hemant Dhami 1/31 (5 overs)

Nepal Police Club won by 9 wickets
Tribhuvan University International Cricket Ground, Kirtipur
Umpires: Sanjay Gurung and Ram Pandey
Player of the match: Sagar Dhakal (Nepal Police Club)

- Nepal Police Club won the toss and elected to field.

Match 10
20 January 2021
09:00
Scorecard

Province Number 1; 131 (40.1 overs)	v	Tribhuwan Army Club; 135/6 (29.5 overs)
Bibek Meheta 50 (83); Shahab Alam 4/23 (9.1 overs)		Rohit Kumar Poudel 36 (31); Firdosh Ansari 1/19 (5 overs)

Tribhuwan Army Club won by 4 wickets
Mulpani Cricket Stadium, Kageshwari-Manohara
Umpires: Mahesh Bohara and Ram Yadav
Player of the match: Shahab Alam (Tribhuwan Army Club)

- Province Number 1 won the toss and elected to bat.

Match 11
21 January 2021
09:00
Scorecard

Nepal Police Club; 310/4 (50 overs)	v	Lumbini Province; 236/7 (50 overs)
Sunil Dhamala 104 (145); Saurav Khanal 1/38 (2 overs)		Saurav Khanal 74 (60); Rashid Khan 2/33 (8 overs)

Nepal Police Club won by 74 runs
Tribhuvan University International Cricket Ground, Kirtipur
Umpires: Buddhi Pradhan and Mahesh Bohara
Player of the match: Sunil Dhamala (Nepal Police Club)

- Lumbini Province won the toss and elected to field.

Match 12
21 January 2021
09:00
Scorecard

Gandaki Province; 106 (46 overs)	v	Armed Police Force Club; 107/4 (17.3 overs)
Sameer Kandel 36 (114); Kamal Airee 4/11 (10 overs)		Asif Sheikh 78 (56); Bishal Paudel 2/19 (3.3 overs)

Armed Police Force Club won by 6 wickets
Mulpani Cricket Stadium, Kageshwari-Manohara
Umpires: Sanjay Gurung and Ram Pandey
Player of the match: Kamal Airee (Armed Police Force Club)

- Armed Police Force Club won the toss and elected to field.

Match 13
22 January 2021
09:00
Scorecard

Province Number 1; 215/9 (50 overs)	v	Karnali Province; 156 (35 overs)
Siddhant Lohani 66 (97); Rabindra Shahi 3/36 (8 overs)		Bipin Rawal 47 (34); Minash Thapa 5/26 (10 overs)

Province Number 1 won by 59 runs
Tribhuvan University International Cricket Ground, Kirtipur
Umpires: Mahesh Bohara and Ram Pandey
Player of the match: Minash Thapa (Province Number 1)

- Province Number 1 won the toss and elected to bat.

Match 14
22 January 2021
09:00
Scorecard

Madhesh Province; 179 (48.2 overs)	v	Bagmati Province; 181/4 (48.2 overs)
Bibek Yadav 66 (74); Gautam KC 4/29 (10 overs)		Prithu Baskota 53* (75); Harishankar Shah 2/36 (10 overs)

Bagmati Province won by 6 wickets
Mulpani Cricket Stadium, Kageshwari-Manohara
Umpires: Kamlesh Thakur and Sanjay Sigdel
Player of the match: Gautam KC (Bagmati Province)

- Province Number 2 won the toss and elected to bat.

Match 15
23 January 2021
09:00
Scorecard

Armed Police Force Club; 218 (49.5 overs)	v	Karnali Province; 147 (43.2 overs)
Sundeep Jora 60 (76); Anuj Chunara 3/30 (6.5 overs)		Hemant Oli 58 (102); Basant Regmi 3/23 (10 overs)

Armed Police Force Club won by 71 runs
Tribhuvan University International Cricket Ground, Kirtipur
Umpires: Himal Giri and Kamlesh Thakur
Player of the match: Sundeep Jora (Armed Police Force Club)

- Armed Police Force Club won the toss and elected to bat.

Match 16
23 January 2021
09:00
Scorecard

Sudurpaschim Province; 62 (27.4 overs)	v	Lumbini Province; 64/4 (14.5 overs)
Narayan Joshi 17 (22); Krishna Karki 4/17 (10 overs)		Saurav Khanal 18 (23); Sher Malla 2/18 (3.5 overs)

Lumbini Province won by 6 wickets
Mulpani Cricket Stadium, Kageshwari-Manohara
Umpires: Ram Yadav and Sanjay Sigdel
Player of the match: Krishna Karki (Lumbini Province)

- Lumbini Province won the toss and elected to field.

Match 17
24 January 2021
09:00
Scorecard

Madhesh Province; 195 (42 overs)	v	Sudurpaschim Province; 196/7 (33 overs)
Harishankar Shah 60 (73); Sher Malla 3/35 (10 overs)		Sanju Damai 57 (35); Kumar Thapa 3/33 (6 overs)

Sudurpaschim Province won by 3 wickets
Tribhuvan University International Cricket Ground, Kirtipur
Umpires: Sanjay Gurung and Ram Pandey
Player of the match: Sanju Damai (Sudur Paschim Province)

- Sudur Paschim Province won the toss and elected to field.

Match 18
24 January 2021
09:00
Scorecard

Bagmati Province; 220/9 (50 overs)	v	Lumbini Province; 220 (48 overs)
Aadil Khan 55 (87); Dipendra Rawat 3/40 (9 overs)		Krishna Karki 41 (44); Bipin Acharya 4/30 (7 overs)

Match tied
Mulpani Cricket Stadium, Kageshwari-Manohara
Umpires: Buddhi Pradhan and Kamlesh Thakur
Player of the match: Bipin Acharya (Bagmati Province)

- Bagmati Province won the toss and elected to bat.

Match 19
25 January 2021
09:00
Scorecard

Armed Police Force Club; 240 (49.4 overs)	v	Tribhuwan Army Club; 234/8 (50 overs)
Sumit Maharjan 46 (68); Hari Chauhan 5/60 (9.4 overs)		Anil Mandal 45 (76); Kamal Airee 3/31 (10 overs)

Armed Police Force Club won by 6 runs
Tribhuvan University International Cricket Ground, Kirtipur
Umpires: Buddhi Pradhan and Ram Yadav
Player of the match: Kamal Airee (Armed Police Force Club)

- Tribhuwan Army Club won the toss and elected to field.

Match 20
25 January 2021
09:00
Scorecard

Madhesh Province; 169/9 (47 overs)	v	Nepal Police Club; 170/6 (38 overs)
Harishankar Shah 53 (84); Lalit Rajbanshi 4/37 (8 overs)		Anil Sah 47* (69); Bibek Yadav 3/19 (6 overs)

Nepal Police Club won by 4 wickets
Mulpani Cricket Stadium, Kageshwari-Manohara
Umpires: Himal Giri and Sanjay Gurung
Player of the match: Lalit Rajbanshi (Nepal Police Club)

- Nepal Police Club won the toss and elected to field.
- The match was reduced to 47 overs per side due to a wet outfield.

== Playoffs ==
=== Semi finals ===
Match 21
27 January 2021
09:00
Scorecard

Armed Police Force Club; 203/9 (50 overs)	v	Nepal Police Club; 173 (49.2 overs)
Shankar Rana 44 (96); Aarif Sheikh 3/31 (10 overs)		Pawan Sarraf 40 (61); Bhuvan Karki 4/21 (9.2 overs)

Armed Police Force Club won by 30 runs
Tribhuvan University International Cricket Ground, Kirtipur
Umpires: Himal Giri and Buddhi Pradhan
Player of the match: Bhuvan Karki (Armed Police Force Club)

- Nepal Police Club won the toss and elected to field.

Match 22
28 January 2021
09:00
Scorecard

Tribhuwan Army Club; 229 (50 overs)	v	Bagmati Province; 135 (40.2 overs)
Rajesh Pulami 65 (91); Gautam KC 5/61 (10 overs)		Gyanendra Malla 47 (60); Jitendra Mukhiya 4/24 (8.2 overs)

Tribhuwan Army Club won by 94 runs
Tribhuvan University International Cricket Ground, Kirtipur
Umpires: Sanjay Gurung and Ram Pandey
Player of the match: Rajesh Pulami (Tribhuwan Army Club)

- Bagmati Province won the toss and elected to field.

=== Final ===
Match 23
30 January 2021
09:00
Scorecard

Tribhuwan Army Club; 211/9 (50 overs)	v	Armed Police Force Club; 178 (41.3 overs)
Hari Chauhan 58 (102); Abinash Bohara 4/25 (10 overs)		Asif Sheikh 61 (71); Bikram Sob 3/27 (9 overs)

Tribhuwan Army Club won by 33 runs
Tribhuvan University International Cricket Ground, Kirtipur
Umpires: Sanjay Gurung and Buddhi Pradhan
Player of the match: Jitendra Mukhiya (Tribhuwan Army Club)

- Armed Police Force Club won the toss and elected to field.
