= 2024 Prime Minister Cup =

6th edition of the Prime Minister Cup Men's National Cricket Tournament

- Tournament logo
- Dates: 13 January – 3 February 2024
- Administrator(s): National Sports Council; Cricket Association of Nepal
- Cricket format: One Day
- Tournament format(s): Round-robin and Final
- Host: Nepal
- Champions: Nepal Police Club (3rd title)
- Runners-up: Tribuwan Army Club
- Participants: 10
- Matches: 46
- Player of the series: Surya Tamang (Bagmati Province)
- Most runs: Anil Sah (Madhesh Province) (386)
- Most wickets: Surya Tamang (Bagmati Province) (30)

The 2024 Prime Minister Cup was the sixth edition of the Prime Minister One Day Cup, the premier one-day cricket tournament in Nepal. The tournament was contest by teams representing the seven Provinces of Nepal as well as three departmental teams. It began on 13 January 2024 and end on 3 February. The tournament will be played in three different venues.

The format was changed for the 2024 season, with the ten team competing in a round-robin format the top two teams qualifying for the final and top four team qualify for the Jay Trophy which will be played in a multi-day format.

Nepal Police Club clinched the title of the Prime Minister Cup Men's National Cricket Tournament for the third time after they defeated Nepal Army Club by 6 wickets in the final.

== Squads ==
Nepal APF Club	Bagmati Province	Gandaki Province	Lumbini Province	Karnali Province
Rohit Paudel (c); Aasif Sheikh (wk); Sundeep Jora; Abinash Bohara; Lokesh Bam; Mousom Dhakal; Pradeep Airee; Bhuvan Karki; Irshad Ahamad; Puran BK; Ramesh Kurmi; Sumit Maharjan; Amar Routela; Prajwal Shahi	Rit Gautam (c); Rabin Joshi (wk); Pratish GC; Surya Tamang; Rijan Dhakal; Ishan Pandey; Bipin Acharya; Sonu Devkota; Asshutosh Ghiraiya; Krijan Gurung; Gautam KC; Bibek Rana Magar; Ashok Paudel; Ptatik Shrestha	Bipin Khatri (c); Sameer Kandel (vc); Krishna Ayer; Ishwor Chhetri; Amrit Gurung; Roshan Gautam; Muskan Thapa; Ashwini Rana; Ankit Neupane; Chandrakanta Paudel; Kamal Pariyar; Krishna Paudel; Karan Pangeni; Sandeep Parajuli	Sushant Singh Thapa (c); Dilsad Ali; Ikhlaque Ahmad; Bharat Bhandari; Samrat Bhusal; Rahul Chauhan; Abhisesh Gautam; Bir Bahadur GM; Mrinal Gurung; Nirmal Gurung; Mohammad Hussain; Krishna Karki; Prajwal Bahadur Thapa; Nar Bahadur Sarki	Rabindra Shahi (c); Arjun Gharti (wk); Dinesh Adhikari; Anuj Chanara; Prakash Jaishi; Rajesh Khadka; Diwan Pun; Dipendra Rawat; Nischal Rawol; Bipin Sharma; Aditiya Shah; Bipin Shahi; Himanshu Shahi; Unish Singh
Koshi Province	Madhesh Province	Nepal Police Club	Sudurpashchim Province	Tribhuwan Army Club
Ankit Subedi (c); Firdosh Ansari (vc); Meenash Thapa (wk); Sonu Ansari; Aish Bhattarai; Saujan Ghimire; Suhan Gahatraj; Kamal Khatri; Samer Karki; Bhupal Leuitel; Sonu Mandal; Heman Rai; Avyash Timsina; Sujan Tahapliya	Harishankar Shah (c); Pawan Sarraf (vc); Anil Sah (wk); Samsad Ansari; Ranjit Kumar; Rahul Mandal; Bishal Patel; Pradip Paswan; Rupesh Singh; Abhishek Tiwari; Arniko Yadav; Mayan Yadav; Niraj Yadav; Rajesh Yadav	Dipendra Singh Airee (c); Arjun Saud (wk); Lalit Rajbanshi; Kushal Bhurtel; Aarif Sheikh; Karan KC; Sagar Dhakal; Rashid Khan; Dilip Nath; Sunil Dhamala; Lalit Bhandari; Roshan Buda; Shankar Rana; Amit Shrestha	Raju Rijal (c, wk); Tek Rawal (wk); Bikash Aagri; Bhoj Raj Bhatta; Gajendra Bohara; Khadak Bohara; Naren Bhatta; Milan Bohara; Dipak Chand; Narayan Joshi; Sher Malla; Prakash Pandey; Naren Saud; Kiran Thagunna	Binod Bhandari (c, wk); Santosh Karki (wk); Sompal Kami; Kushal Malla; Bhim Sharki; Bibek Yadav; Basir Ahamad; Shahab Alam; Jitendra Mukhiya; Avinash Karn; Pawan Karki; Nitesh Patel; Sandeep Rajali; Imran Sheikh

== Venue ==
Nepal

== Points table ==
Pos	Team	Pld	W	L	NR	Pts	NRR	Qualification
1	Nepal Police Club	9	9	0	0	18	2.128	Advanced to the final and qualified for the 2024–25 Jay Trophy
2	Tribhuwan Army Club	9	7	2	0	14	1.792	Advanced to the final and qualified for the 2024–25 Jay Trophy
3	Bagmati Province	9	6	3	0	12	1.117	Qualified for the 2024–25 Jay Trophy
4	Madhesh Province	9	6	3	0	12	0.206	Qualified for the 2024–25 Jay Trophy
5	Nepal APF Club	9	5	4	0	10	1.022	
6	Sudurpashchim Province	9	4	5	0	8	−0.142	
7	Karnali Province	9	4	5	0	8	−0.995	
8	Gandaki Province	9	2	7	0	4	−1.038	
9	Lumbini Province	9	1	8	0	2	−1.493	
10	Koshi Province	9	1	8	0	2	−2.468	

Source: ESPNcricinfo

== League stage ==
Match 1
13 January 2024
09:15
Scorecard

Nepal Police Club; 282/8 (50 overs)	v	Bagmati Province; 214 (42.3 overs)
Rashid Khan 106* (112); Rijan Dhakal 3/54 (10 overs)		Ashutosh Ghiraiya 92 (87); Sagar Dhakal 3/56 (9 overs)

Nepal Police Club won by 68 runs
Tribhuvan University International Cricket Ground, Kirtipur
Umpires: Hiralal Raut and Kamalesh Thakur
Player of the match: Rashid Khan (Nepal Police Club)

- Nepal Police Club won the toss and elected to bat.

13 January 2024
09:15
Scorecard

Koshi Province; 127 (41 overs)	v	Madhesh Province; 129/3 (20.1 overs)
Firdosh Ansari 41 (71); Pradip Paswan 3/15 (7 overs)		Anil Sah 88 (54); Sonu Mandal 2/15 (3 overs)

Madhesh Province won by 7 wickets
Mulpani International Cricket Ground, Kageshwari-Manohara
Umpires: Himal Giri and Durga Subedi
Player of the match: Anil Sah (Madhesh Province)

- Madhesh Province won the toss and elected to field.

13 January 2024
09:15
Scorecard

Gandaki Province; 111 (34.4 overs)	v	Lumbini Province; 113/6 (28.2 overs)
Karan Pangeni 28 (62); Ajay Chauhan 4/15 (7.4 overs)		Mrinal Gurung 47 (78); Kamal Pariyar 3/25 (7 overs)

Lumbini Province won by 4 wickets
Siddhartha Cricket Stadium, Siddharthanagar
Umpires: Ram Pandey and Sanjay Sigdel
Player of the match: Ajay Chauhan (Lumbini Province)

- Lumbini Province won the toss and elected to field.
- The match was reduced to 42 overs per side due to wet outfield.

14 January 2024
9:15
Scorecard

Nepal APF Club; 241/9 (50 overs)	v	Bagmati Province; 152 (42.5 overs)
Sundeep Jora 112 (117); Surya Tamang 3/32 (10 overs)		Rit Gautam 60 (89); Rohit Paudel 4/26 (9 overs)

Nepal APF Club won by 89 runs
Tribhuvan University International Cricket Ground, Kirtipur
Umpires: Vinay Kumar Jha and Ujjwal Regmi
Player of the match: Sandeep Jora (Nepal APF Club)

- Bagmati Province won the toss and elected to field.

14 January 2024
09:15
Scorecard

Gandaki Province; 122/9 (45 overs)	v	Karnali Province; 126/3 (33.2 overs)
Kamal Pariyar 21 (44); Dinesh Adhikari 2/9 (8 overs)		Himanshu Shahi 53 (71); Ankit Neupane 2/14 (4.2 overs)

Karnali Province won by 7 wickets
Siddhartha Cricket Stadium, Siddharthanagar
Umpires: Sanjay Gurung and Ram Pandey
Player of the match: Dinesh Adhikari (Karnali Province)

- Karnali Province won the toss and elected to field.
- The match was reduced to 45 overs per side due to wet outfield.

15 January 2024
09:15
Scorecard

Tribhuwan Army Club; 320 (50 overs)	v	Madhesh Province; 194 (48.4 overs)
Binod Bhandari 113 (93); Ranjit Kumar 5/41 (9 overs)		Pawan Sarraf 65 (83); Shahab Alam 4/37 (10 overs)

Tribhuwan Army Club won by 126 runs
Tribhuvan University International Cricket Ground, Kirtipur
Umpires: Buddhi Pradhan and Himal Giri
Player of the match: Binod Bhandari (Tribhuwan Army Club)

- Madhesh Province won the toss and elected to field.

15 January 2024
09:15
Scorecard

Koshi Province; 135 (44.3 overs)	v	Nepal APF Club; 136/4 (19.1 overs)
Firdosh Ansari 55 (85); Abinash Bohara 3/13 (8.3 overs)		Rohit Paudel 80 (53); Kamal Khatri 1/30 (5 overs)

Nepal APF Club won by 6 wickets
Mulpani International Cricket Ground, Kageshwari-Manohara
Umpires: Durga Subedi and Ram Yadav
Player of the match: Rohit Paudel (Nepal APF Club)

- Nepal APF Club won the toss and elected to field.
- The match was reduced to 47 overs per side due to wet outfield.

15 January 2024
09:15
Scorecard

Lumbini Province; 158 (48.4 overs)	v	Sudurpashchim Province; 159/5 (29.3 overs)
Prajjwol Thapa 42 (68); Narayan Joshi 3/36 (9.4 overs)		Sher Malla 42* (44); Avishek Gautam 3/60 (10 overs)

Sudurpashchim Province won by 5 wickets
Siddhartha Cricket Stadium, Siddharthanagar
Umpires: Ram Pandey and Sanjay Sigdel
Player of the match: Narayan Joshi (Sudurpaschim Province)

- Sudurpashchim Province won the toss and elected to field.

16 January 2024
09:15
Scorecard

Koshi Province; 166 (48.2 overs)	v	Nepal Police Club; 169/3 (23.1 overs)
Sujan Thapaliya 105 (126); Karan KC 3/28 (9.2 overs)		Arjun Saud 62* (63); Kamal Khatri 2/33 (7 overs)

Nepal Police Club won by 7 wickets
Tribhuvan University International Cricket Ground, Kirtipur
Umpires: Vinay Kumar Jha and Hiralal Raut
Player of the match: Karan KC (Nepal Police Club)

- Nepal Police Club won the toss and elected to field.

16 January 2024
09:15
Scorecard

Bagmati Province; 190 (49.2 overs)	v	Madhesh Province; 104 (29 overs)
Pratis GC 59 (55); Rupesh Singh 2/23 (7.2 overs)		Pawan Sarraf 45 (48); Surya Tamang 6/18 (9 overs)

Bagmati Province won by 86 runs
Mulpani International Cricket Ground, Kageshwari-Manohara
Umpires: Buddhi Pradhan and Kamalesh Thakur
Player of the match: Surya Tamang (Bagmati Province)

- Madhesh Province won the toss and elected to field.

16 January 2024
09:15
Scorecard

Sudurpashchim Province; 277/5 (50 overs)	v	Karnali Province; 143 (37.2 overs)
Khadak Bohara 80 (114); Dipendra Rawat 1/29 (10 overs)		Diwan Pun 38 (52); Sher Malla 4/35 (10 overs)

Sudurpashchim Province won by 134 runs
Siddhartha Cricket Stadium, Siddharthanagar
Umpires: Sanjay Gurung and Mahesh Bohara
Player of the match: Khadak Bohara (Sudurpashchim Province)

- Karnali Province won the toss and elected to field.

17 January 2024
09:15
Scorecard

Tribhuwan Army Club; 97 (27.1 overs)	v	Bagmati Province; 103/7 (22.1 overs)
Binod Bhandari 28 (40); Surya Tamang 5/26 (9 overs)		Pratis GC 21* (24); Sompal Kami 3/26 (7 overs)

Bagmati Province won by 3 wickets
Mulpani International Cricket Ground, Kageshwari-Manohara
Umpires: Vinay Kumar Jha and Ujjwal Regmi
Player of the match: Surya Tamang (Bagmati Province)

- Tribhuwan Army Club won the toss and elected to bat.
- The match was reduced to 43 overs per side due to pitch change.

17 January 2024
09:15
Scorecard

Karnali Province; 184/9 (45 overs)	v	Lumbini Province; 124 (41.2 overs)
Dinesh Adhikari 56* (59); Nirmal Gurung 3/21 (9 overs)		Krishna Karki 47 (77); Dinesh Adhikari 3/18 (6 overs)

Karnali Province won by 60 runs
Siddhartha Cricket Stadium, Siddharthanagar
Umpires: Mahesh Bohara and Sanjay Sigdel
Player of the match: Dinesh Adhikari (Karnali Province)

- Lumbini Province won the toss and elected to field.
- The match was reduced to 45 overs per side due to bad weather.

18 January 2024
09:15
Scorecard

Nepal APF Club; 246/9 (50 overs)	v	Madhesh Province; 247/5 (48 overs)
Aasif Sheikh 59 (69); Pradip Paswan 3/35 (10 overs)		Rupesh Singh 72* (72); Ramesh Kurmi 2/42 (10 overs)

Madhesh Province won by 5 wickets
Tribhuvan University International Cricket Ground, Kirtipur
Umpires: Himal Giri and Kamalesh Thakur
Player of the match: Rupesh Singh (Madhesh Province)

- Madhesh Province won the toss and elected to field.

18 January 2024
09:15
Scorecard

Koshi Province; 88 (24.4 overs)	v	Tribhuwan Army Club; 92/1 (9.5 overs)
Ankit Subedi 41 (37); Shahab Alam 6/14 (6.4 overs)		Imran Sheikh 32 (25); Sujan Thapaliya 1/22 (2 overs)

Tribhuwan Army Club won by 9 wickets
Mulpani International Cricket Ground, Kageshwari-Manohara
Umpires: Hiralal Raut and Durga Subedi
Player of the match: Shahab Alam (Tribhuwan Army Club)

- Tribhuwan Army Club won the toss and elected to field.

18 January 2024
09:15
Scorecard

Sudurpashchim Province; 201 (50 overs)	v	Gandaki Province; 93 (30.2 overs)
Kiran Thagunna 60 (73); Bipin Khatri 3/9 (10 overs)		Aswani Rana 25 (67); Sher Malla 5/23 (8.2 overs)

Sudurpashchim Province won by 108 runs
Siddhartha Cricket Stadium, Siddharthanagar
Umpires: Sanjay Gurung and Ram Pandey
Player of the match: Sher Malla (Sudurpashchim Province)

- Gandaki Province won the toss and elected to field.

19 January 2024
09:15
Scorecard

Bagmati Province; 273 (48.3 overs)	v	Koshi Province; 209 (47.1 overs)
Ashutosh Ghiraiya 118 (111); Avyash Timishina 3/43 (9 overs)		Sujan Thapaliya 59 (76); Ishan Pandey 5/39 (8 overs)

Bagmati Province won by 64 runs
Tribhuvan University International Cricket Ground, Kirtipur
Umpires: Vinay Kumar Jha and Buddhi Pradhan
Player of the match: Ashutosh Ghiraiya (Bagmati Province)

- Koshi Province won the toss and elected to field.

20 January 2024
09:15
Scorecard

Madhesh Province; 213/9 (50 overs)	v	Karnali Province; 170 (41.1 overs)
Harishankar Shah 50 (61); Dipendra Rawat 4/39 (10 overs)		Arjun Gharti 58 (105); Rajesh Yadav 3/27 (6 overs)

Madhesh Province won by 61 runs.
Tribhuvan University International Cricket Ground, Kirtipur
Umpires: Durga Subedi and Kamalesh Thakur
Player of the match: Harishankar Shah (Madhesh Province)

- Madhesh Province won the toss and elected to bat.

21 January 2024
09:15
Scorecard

Gandaki Province; 167 (48.2 overs)	v	Koshi Province; 25 (15.2 overs)
Muskan Thapa 67 (122); Avyash Timishina 6/23 (9.2 overs)		Ankit Subedi 8 (6); Bipin Khatri 6/4 (7 overs)

Gandaki Province won by 142 runs
Mulpani International Cricket Ground, Kageshwari-Manohara
Umpires: Hiralal Raut and Ram Yadav
Player of the match: Bipin Khatri (Gandaki Province)

- Koshi Province won the toss and elected field.
- Koshi Province's score of 25 was the lowest total in Prime Minister Cup history.
- Bipin Khatri (Gandaki Province) took his maiden five-wicket haul in Prime Minister Cup.

21 January 2024
09:15
Scorecard

Nepal Police Club; 140 (31.4 overs)	v	Tribhuwan Army Club; 127 (32.2 overs)
Sunil Dhamala 52 (80); Sompal Kami 4/12 (6 overs)		Bhim Sharki 52 (76); Sagar Dhakal 3/14 (7 overs)

Nepal Police Club won by 13 runs
Siddhartha Cricket Stadium, Siddharthanagar
Umpires: Ram Pandey and Sanjay Sigdel
Player of the match: Sagar Dhakal (Nepal Police Club)

- Tribhuwan Army Club won the toss and elected to field.
- The match was reduced to 33 overs per side due to bad weather.

22 January 2024
09:15
Scorecard

Madhesh Province; 319/9 (50 overs)	v	Sudurpashchim Province; 239 (44.5 overs)
Mayan Yadav 115 (128); Sher Malla 4/64 (10 overs)		Naren Bhatta 121 (122); Rajesh Yadav 3/38 (6 overs)

Madhesh Province won by 80 runs
Tribhuvan University International Cricket Ground, Kirtipur
Umpires: Vinay Kumar Jha and Ram Yadav
Player of the match: Mayan Yadav (Madhesh Province)

- Madhesh Province won the toss and elected to bat.

22 January 2024
09:15
Scorecard

Karnali Province; 78 (24.2 overs)	v	Bagmati Province; 80/3 (13 overs)
Arjun Gharti 23 (19); Rijan Dhakal 5/25 (7 overs)		Ishan Pandey 40 (36); Diwan Pun 3/29 (6 overs)

Bagmati Province won by 7 wickets
Mulpani International Cricket Ground, Kageshwari-Manohara
Umpires: Buddhi Pradhan and Hiralal Raut
Player of the match: Rijan Dhakal (Bagmati Province)

- Karnali Province won the toss and elected to bat.

22 January 2024
09:15
Scorecard

Nepal Police Club; 145 (41 overs)	v	Nepal APF Club; 87 (34 overs)
Dilip Nath 44 (63); Bhuvan Karki 3/25 (10 overs)		Sundeep Jora 25 (67); Lalit Rajbanshi 5/8 (8 overs)

Nepal Police Club won by 58 runs
Siddhartha Cricket Stadium, Siddharthanagar
Umpires: Mahesh Bohara and Ram Pandey
Player of the match: Lalit Rajbanshi (Nepal Police Club)

- Nepal APF Club won the toss and elected to field.
- The match was reduced to 49 overs per side due to bad weather.

23 January 2024
09:15
Scorecard

Bagmati Province; 198 (49.1 overs)	v	Gandaki Province; 202/7 (49.3 overs)
Ashutosh Ghiraiya 44 (69); Kamal Pariyar 4/31 (10 overs)		Karan Pangeni 79 (98); Pratis GC 2/35 (9 overs)

Gandaki Province won by 3 wickets
Tribhuvan University International Cricket Ground, Kirtipur
Umpires: Buddhi Pradhan and Kamalesh Thakur
Player of the match: Kamal Pariyar (Gandaki Province)

- Bagmati Province won the toss and elected to bat.

23 January 2024
09:15
Scorecard

Koshi Province; 151 (34.3 overs)	v	Karnali Province; 153/4 (28.3 overs)
Sujan Thapaliya 73 (73); Dinesh Adhikari 4/18 (8 overs)		Arjun Gharti 50* (48); Hemanta Rai 3/42 (9.3 overs)

Karnali Province won by 6 wickets
Mulpani International Cricket Ground, Kageshwari-Manohara
Umpires: Himal Giri and Basu Karn
Player of the match: Arjun Gharti (Karnali Province)

- Karnali Province won the toss and elected to field.

23 January 2024
09:15
Scorecard

Nepal APF Club; 121 (32.4 overs)	v	Tribhuwan Army Club; 122/6 (23.3 overs)
Rohit Paudel 59 (103); Sompal Kami 3/24 (6.4 overs)		Binod Bhandari 34* (40); Ramesh Kurmi 2/29 (7 overs)

Tribhuwan Army Club won by 4 wickets
Siddhartha Cricket Stadium, Siddharthanagar
Umpires: Sanjay Gurung and Ram Pandey
Player of the match: Sompal Kami (Tribhuwan Army Club)

- Tribhuwan Army Club won the toss and elected to field.
- The match was reduced to 36 overs per side due to heavy fog.

24 January 2024
09:15
Scorecard

Koshi Province; 123 (32 overs)	v	Sudurpashchim Province; 124/2 (21.1 overs)
Meenash Thapa 26 (37); Sher Malla 5/28 (6 overs)		Naren Bhatta 54* (49); Firdosh Ansari 2/20 (4 overs)

Sudurpashchim Province won by 8 wickets
Tribhuvan University International Cricket Ground, Kirtipur
Umpires: Himal Giri and Ram Yadav
Player of the match: Bikash Aagri (Sudurpashchim Province)

- Koshi Province won the toss and elected to bat.

24 January 2024
09:15
Scorecard

Madhesh Province; 96 (24 overs)	v	Nepal Police Club; 99/4 (18.3 overs)
Arniko Yadav 23 (26); Sagar Dhakal 5/41 (9 overs)		Sunil Dhamala 28 (27); Ranjit Kumar 2/21 (6.3 overs)

Nepal Police Club won by 6 wickets
Mulpani International Cricket Ground, Kageshwari-Manohara
Umpires: Vinay Kumar Jha and Durga Subedi
Player of the match: Sagar Dhakal (Nepal Police Club)

- Nepal Police Club won the toss and elected to field.

24 January 2024
09:15
Scorecard

Tribhuwan Army Club; 170/7 (26 overs)	v	Lumbini Province; 105/8 (26 overs)
Imran Sheikh 67 (70); Md Hussain 2/40 (6 overs)		Krishna Karki 35* (62); Kushal Malla 4/11 (6 overs)

Tribhuwan Army Club won by 65 runs
Siddhartha Cricket Stadium, Siddharthanagar
Umpires: Mahesh Bohara and Sanjay Sigdel
Player of the match: Imran Sheikh (Tribhuwan Army Club)

- Lumbini Province won the toss and elected to field.
- The match was reduced to 26 overs per side due to heavy fog.

25 January 2024
09:15
Scorecard

Madhesh Province; 335/5 (50 overs)	v	Gandaki Province; 190 (39.5 overs)
Anil Sah 127 (125); Sandeep Parajuli 2/51 (10 overs)		Kamal Pariyar 27 (20); Ranjit Kumar 4/51 (10 overs)

Madhesh Province won by 145 runs
Tribhuvan University International Cricket Ground, Kirtipur
Umpires: Vinay Kumar Jha and Ram Yadav
Player of the match: Anil Sah (Madhesh Province)

- Madhesh Province won the toss and elected to bat.
- Krishna Poudel (Gandaki Province) bowled the most expensive spell in a Prime Minister Cup match, conceding 117 runs from his ten overs.

25 January 2024
09:15
Scorecard

Bagmati Province; 247/9 (50 overs)	v	Sudurpashchim Province; 150 (30.3 overs)
Ashutosh Ghiraiya 54 (62); Sher Malla 3/55 (10 overs)		Kiran Thagunna 41 (27); Surya Tamang 3/17 (7.3 overs)

Bagmati Province won by 97 runs
Mulpani International Cricket Ground, Kageshwari-Manohara
Umpires: Basu Karn and Buddhi Pradhan
Player of the match: Rit Gautam (Bagmati Province)

- Sudurpashchim Province won the toss and elected to field.

25 January 2024
09:15
Scorecard

Lumbini Province; 133 (41 overs)	v	Nepal APF Club; 135/3 (22.3 overs)
Dilsad Ali 39* (42); Ramesh Kurmi 5/29 (10 overs)		Rohit Paudel 52 (48); Krishna Karki 1/18 (6 overs)

Nepal APF Club won by 7 wickets
Siddhartha Cricket Stadium, Siddharthanagar
Umpires: Mahesh Bohara and Sanjay Sigdel
Player of the match: Ramesh Kurmi (Nepal APF Club)

- Lumbini Province won the toss and elected to bat.

26 January 2024
09:15
Scorecard

Karnali Province; 171 (42.5 overs)	v	Nepal Police Club; 172/4 (23.4 overs)
Nischal Rawal 50 (107); Sagar Dhakal 3/48 (9.5 overs)		Dilip Nath 75* (62); Prakash Jaishi 2/32 (3 overs)

Nepal Police Club won by 6 wickets
Tribhuvan University International Cricket Ground, Kirtipur
Umpires: Himal Giri and Durga Subedi
Player of the match: Dilip Nath (Nepal Police Club)

- Karnali Province won the toss and elected to bat.

27 January 2024
09:15
Scorecard

Lumbini Province; 106 (32.2 overs)	v	Bagmati Province; 107/4 (17.2 overs)
Sushant Thapa 28 (55); Surya Tamang 6/26 (10 overs)		Ishan Pandey 50 (54); Nirmal Gurung 2/23 (4 overs)

Bagmati Province won by 6 wickets
Tribhuvan University International Cricket Ground, Kirtipur
Umpires: Basu Karn and Buddhi Pradhan
Player of the match: Surya Tamang (Bagmati Province)

- Bagmati Province won the toss and elected to field.

27 January 2024
09:15
Scorecard

Nepal APF Club; 207 (47.2 overs)	v	Gandaki Province; 119 (33.4 overs)
Lokesh Bam 50 (67); Kamal Pariyar 3/55 (10 overs)		Sameer Kandel 33 (64); Amar Rautela 4/17 (7 overs)

Nepal APF Club won by 88 runs
Mulpani International Cricket Ground, Kageshwari-Manohara
Umpires: Vinay Kumar Jha and Ram Yadav
Player of the match: Bhuvan Karki (Nepal APF Club)

- Gandaki Province won the toss and elected to field.

28 January 2024
09:15
Scorecard

Tribhuwan Army Club; 279/5 (50 overs)	v	Karnali Province; 115 (29 overs)
Binod Bhandari 100* (132); Dipendra Rawat 2/45 (9 overs)		Himanshu Shahi 19 (22); Kushal Malla 3/20 (7 overs)

Tribhuwan Army Club won by 164 runs
Tribhuvan University International Cricket Ground, Kirtipur
Umpires: Vinay Kumar Jha and Basu Karn
Player of the match: Binod Bhandari (Tribhuwan Army Club)

- Karnali Province won the toss and elected to field.

28 January 2024
09:15
Scorecard

Madhesh Province; 169 (41.3 overs)	v	Lumbini Province; 160 (40.5 overs)
Arniko Yadav 38 (50); Bir Magar 4/34 (8.3 overs)		Prajjwol Thapa 62 (79); Pradip Paswan 6/30 (9 overs)

Madhesh Province won by 9 runs
Mulpani International Cricket Ground, Kageshwari-Manohara
Umpires: Himal Giri and Kamalesh Thakur
Player of the match: Pradip Paswan (Madhesh Province)

- Lumbini Province won the toss and elected to field.
- The match was reduced to 42 overs per side due to wet pitch.

29 January 2024
09:15
Scorecard

Tribhuwan Army Club; 262 (48.3 overs)	v	Sudurpashchim Province; 165 (40.1 overs)
Kushal Malla 75 (67); Bhoj Raj Bhatta 6/63 (9.3 overs)		Kiran Thagunna 68 (74); Jitendra Mukhiya 5/10 (6.1 overs)

Tribhuwan Army Club won by 97 runs
Tribhuvan University International Cricket Ground, Kirtipur
Umpires: Buddhi Pradhan and Ujjwal Regmi
Player of the match: Jitendra Mukhiya (Tribhuwan Army Club)

- Tribhuwan Army Club won the toss and elected to bat.

29 January 2024
09:15
Scorecard

Gandaki Province; 170 (38.3 overs)	v	Nepal Police Club; 171/4 (24.2 overs)
Amrit Gurung 50 (39); Rashid Khan 5/25 (6 overs)		Dilip Nath 57 (39); Sandeep Parajuli 2/21 (6.2 overs)

Nepal Police Club won by 6 wickets
Mulpani International Cricket Ground, Kageshwari-Manohara
Umpires: Kamalesh Thakur and Ram Yadav
Player of the match: Rashid Khan (Nepal Police Club)

- Nepal Police Club won the toss and elected to field.
- The match was reduced to 45 overs per side due to wet pitch.

30 January 2024
09:15
Scorecard

Koshi Province; 172 (44.4 overs)	v	Lumbini Province; 156 (46.5 overs)
Ankit Subedi 49 (65); Nar Sarki 4/38 (10 overs)		Dilsad Ali 32 (64); Saujan Ghimire 3/31 (10 overs)

Koshi Province won by 16 runs
Tribhuvan University International Cricket Ground, Kirtipur
Umpires: Vinay Kumar Jha and Basu Karn
Player of the match: Saujan Ghimire (Koshi Province)

- Lumbini Province won the toss and elected to field.

30 January 2024
09:15
Scorecard

Sudurpashchim Province; 87 (16.2 overs)	v	Nepal APF Club; 89/7 (14.1 overs)
Narayan Joshi 31* (25); Chandan Ram 5/51 (7 overs)		Sundeep Jora 18* (15); Dipak Chand 4/36 (7 overs)

Nepal APF Club won by 3 wickets
Mulpani International Cricket Ground, Kageshwari-Manohara
Umpires: Himal Giri and Durga Subedi
Player of the match: Chandan Ram (Nepal APF Club)

- Nepal APF Club won the toss and elected to field.

31 January 2024
09:15
Scorecard

Karnali Province; 206 (44.1 overs)	v	Nepal APF Club; 185 (44 overs)
Himanshu Shahi 62 (50); Mousom Dhakal 3/32 (9 overs)		Aasif Sheikh 108 (112); Prakash Jaishi 4/9 (3 overs)

Karnali Province won by 21 runs
Tribhuvan University International Cricket Ground, Kirtipur
Umpires: Basu Karn and Kamalesh Thakur
Player of the match: Prakash Jaishi (Karnali Province)

- Nepal APF Club won the toss and elected to field.

31 January 2024
09:15
Scorecard

Nepal Police Club; 245 (37.3 overs)	v	Lumbini Province; 142 (36.3 overs)
Aarif Sheikh 76 (76); Nar Sarki 4/77 (8 overs)		Dilsad Ali 36 (46); Kushal Bhurtel 3/31 (6 overs)

Nepal Police Club won by 103 runs
Mulpani International Cricket Ground, Kageshwari-Manohara
Umpires: Ujjwal Regmi and Ram Yadav

- Nepal Police Club won the toss and elected to bat.
- The match was reduced to 38 overs per side due to wet outfield.

1 February 2024
09:15
Scorecard

Tribhuwan Army Club; 132 (39.1 overs)	v	Gandaki Province; 64/9 (23.4 overs)
Imran Sheikh 34 (64); Amrit Gurung 2/11 (5.1 overs)		Ishwar Chhetri 16 (27); Shahab Alam 4/17 (7 overs)

Tribhuwan Army Club won by 68 runs
Tribhuvan University International Cricket Ground, Kirtipur
Umpires: Durga Subedi and Kamalesh Thakur
Player of the match: Shahab Alam (Tribhuwan Army Club)

- Tribhuwan Army Club won the toss and elected to bat.

1 February 2024
09:15
Scorecard

Nepal Police Club; 198 (47.5 overs)	v	Sudurpashchim Province; 120 (37.1 overs)
Shankar Rana 47 (52); Sher Malla 3/51 (9.5 overs)		Gajendra Bohara 30 (41); Dipendra Singh Airee 7/20 (10 overs)

Nepal Police Club won by 78 runs
Mulpani International Cricket Ground, Kageshwari-Manohara
Umpires: Himal Giri and Vinay Kumar Jha
Player of the match: Dipendra Singh Airee (Nepal Police Club)

- Nepal Police Club won the toss and elected to bat.
- The match was reduced to 49 overs per side due to bad weather.
- Dipendra Singh Airee (Nepal Police Club) 7/20 in ten overs was the best bowling figure in Prime Minister Cup history.

== Final ==
Match 46
3 February 2024
09:30
Scorecard

Tribhuwan Army Club; 181 (49.5 overs)	v	Nepal Police Club; 183/4 (37.5 overs)
Bibek Yadav 63 (81); Lalit Rajbanshi 3/21 (10 overs)		Shankar Rana 62* (43); Shahab Alam 1/35 (10 overs)

Nepal Police Club won by 6 wickets
Tribhuvan University International Cricket Ground, Kirtipur
Umpires: Vinay Kumar Jha and Durga Subedi
Player of the match: Lalit Rajbanshi (Nepal Police Club)

- Nepal Police Club won the toss and elected to field.

== Statistics and awards ==
Source:ESPNcricinfo

Most runs
Runs	Player	Team
386 runs	Anil Sah	Madhesh Province
382 runs	Ashutosh Ghiraiya	Bagmati Province
351 runs	Binod Bhandari	Tribhuwan Army Club
329 runs	Pawan Sarraf	Madhesh Province
287 runs	Mayan Yadav	Madhesh Province

- Source: ESPNcricinfo

Most wickets
Wickets	Player	Team
30 wickets	Surya Tamang	Bagmati Province
24 wickets	Sher Malla	Sudurpashchim Province
23 wickets	Lalit Narayan Rajbanshi	Nepal Police Club
23 wickets	Shahab Alam	Tribhuwan Army Club
20 wickets	Bipin Khatri	Gandaki Province

- Source: ESPNcricinfo

=== End of season awards ===
- Player of the series: Surya Tamang (Bagmati Province)
- Best Batter: Anil Sah (Madhesh Province) (386 runs)
- Best Bowler: Surya Tamang (Bagmati Province) (30 wickets)
- Emerging Player: Ashutosh Ghiraiya (Bagmati Province)
