= 2019–20 Manmohan Memorial National One-Day Cup =

Cricket tournament

2020 Manmohan Memorial National One-Day Cup
- Dates: 2 – 18 January 2020
- Cricket format: 50 overs
- Tournament format(s): Group stage, playoffs
- Champions: Nepal Army (2nd title)
- Participants: 12
- Matches: 15
- Player of the series: Sushan Bhari (Nepal Army Club)
- Most runs: Kushal Malla (196) (Nepal Army Club)
- Most wickets: Sushan Bhari (15) (Nepal Army Club)

The 2020 Manmohan Memorial National One-Day Cricket Tournament was the second edition of one of the main domestic 50-over competitions in Nepal, alongside the Prime Minister One Day Cup. The tournament featured sides representing the seven provinces of Nepal plus three departments, the host club (MMCC Inaruwa) and a Malaysian XI. This was the second edition of the tournament after the first was held in January 2019. The Malaysian national side played a series of one-day matches against Nepal after the conclusion of the tournament.

The Nepal Army Club won the first semi-final, beating Province Number 3 by 64 runs. The second semi-final saw Nepal Police Club triumph by 99 runs against Province No.7. The Army Club went on to retain the title with an 85-run victory in the final.

== Group A ==
=== Points table ===
Team	Pld	W	L	T	NR	Pts
Nepal Army Club	2	2	0	0	0	4
Armed Police Force Club	2	1	1	0	0	2
MMCC Inaruwa	2	0	2	0	0	0

=== Fixtures ===
5 January 2020
09:00
Scorecard

Nepal Army Club; 281 (46 overs)	v	Armed Police Force Club; 173 (39.3 overs)
Kushal Malla 111 (63); Basant Regmi 4/54 (10 overs)		Prithu Baskota 36 (37); Shahab Alam 4/31 (9 overs)

Nepal Army Club won by 108 runs
Inawura, Biratnagar
Umpires: Bhaskar Aryal and Sanjay Gurung
Player of the match: Kushal Malla (Nepal Army Club)

- Nepal Army Club won the toss and elected to bat.
- The match was reduced to 46 overs per side due to a wet outfield.

6 January 2020
09:00
Scorecard

Armed Police Force Club; 204 (43.4 overs)	v	MMCC Inaruwa; 121 (36.2 overs)
Sumit Maharjan 83 (107); Saroj Basnet 4/39 (9 overs)		Ravi Roy 26 (49); Surya Tamang 4/25 (8.2 overs)

Armed Police Force Club won by 83 runs
Inawura, Biratnagar
Umpires: Rabindra Gupta and Zaidan Taha
Player of the match: Sumit Maharjan (Armed Police Force Club)

- Armed Police Force Club won the toss and elected to bat.
- The match was reduced to 45 overs per side due to a wet outfield.

7 January 2020
09:00
Scorecard

Nepal Army Club; 56 (19.3 overs)	v	MMCC Inaruwa; 57/0 (5 overs)
Sushant Timilsina 15 (27); Sushan Bhari 7/16 (8.3 overs)		Kushal Malla 35* (19)

Nepal Army Club won by 10 wickets
Inawura, Biratnagar
Umpires: Mangilal Sharma and Zaidan Taha
Player of the match: Sushan Bhari (Nepal Army Club)

- MMCC Inaruwa won the toss and elected to bat.

== Group B ==
=== Points table ===
Team	Pld	W	L	T	NR	Pts
Nepal Police Club	2	2	0	0	0	4
Province Number 2	2	1	1	0	0	2
Karnali Province	2	0	2	0	0	0

=== Fixtures ===
8 January 2020
09:00
Scorecard

Nepal Police Club; 346 (49.3 overs)	v	Karnali Province; 79 (27.1 overs)
Kushal Bhurtel 78 (49); Rabindra Shahi 3/40 (8 overs)		Raj Shah 23 (14); Manjeet Shrestha 2/10 (5 overs)

Nepal Police Club won by 267 runs
Inawura, Biratnagar
Umpires: Rabindra Gupta and Sanjay Gurung
Player of the match: Kushal Bhurtel (Nepal Police Club)

- Karnali Province won the toss and elected to field.

9 January 2020
09:00
Scorecard

Karnali Province; 129 (31.5 overs)	v	Province Number 2; 130/2 (22.5 overs)
Rabindra Shahi 46 (68); Mahaboob Alam 3/11 (4.5 overs)		Hasim Ansari 80* (73); Anuj Chunara 1/19 (3 overs)

Province Number 2 won by 8 wickets
Inawura, Biratnagar
Umpires: Bhaskar Aryal and Sanjay Gurung
Player of the match: Hasim Ansari (Province Number 2)

- Karnali Province won the toss and elected to bat.

10 January 2020
09:00
Scorecard

Nepal Police Club; 183 (48.1 overs)	v	Province Number 2; 137 (42.2 overs)
Dipendra Singh Airee 50 (64); Kumar Thapa 5/32 (10 overs)		Bishal Shusling 80 (112); Dipendra Singh Airee 3/20 (7 overs)

Nepal Police Club won by 46 runs
Inawura, Biratnagar
Umpires: Mangilal Sharma and Zaidan Taha
Player of the match: Dipendra Singh Airee (Nepal Police Club)

- Province Number 2 won the toss and elected to field.
- The match was reduced to 49 overs per side due to a wet outfield.

== Group C ==
=== Points table ===
Team	Pld	W	L	T	NR	Pts
Province Number 3	2	1	0	0	1	3
Province Number 1	2	1	1	0	0	2
Province Number 5	2	0	1	0	1	1

=== Fixtures ===
2 January 2020
09:00
Scorecard

Province Number 1; 120 (31.2 overs)	v	Province Number 5; 52 (18 overs)
Firdosh Ansari 23 (49); Bikram Bhusal 5/24 (8.2 overs)		Birat Bhandari 28 (34); Dipesh Kandel 6/20 (7 overs)

Province Number 1 won by 68 runs
Inawura, Biratnagar
Umpires: Rabindra Gupta and Zaidan Taha
Player of the match: Dipesh Kandel (Province Number 1)

- Province Number 1 won the toss and elected to bat.

3 January 2020
09:00
Scorecard

Province Number 3; 189 (45.2 overs)	v	Province Number 5; 9/1 (2.1 overs)
Subash Khakurel 42 (65); Bishal Bikram KC 5/34 (10 overs)		Birat Bhandari 6 (5); Pratis GC 1/7 (1 over)

No result
Inawura, Biratnagar
Umpires: Mangilal Sharma and Zaidan Taha

- Province Number 3 won the toss and elected to bat.
- No further play was possible due to rain.

4 January 2020
09:00
Scorecard

Province Number 1; 144 (28 overs)	v	Province Number 3; 147/3 (26 overs)
Puspa Thapa 50 (41); Nandan Yadav 4/22 (6 overs)		Subash Khakurel 85* (73); Shuvankar Urao 2/25 (6 overs)

Province Number 3 won by 7 wickets
Inawura, Biratnagar
Umpires: Sanjay Gurung and Zaidan Taha
Player of the match: Subash Khakurel (Province Number 3)

- Province Number 3 won the toss and elected to field.
- The match was reduced to 28 overs per side due to rain.

== Group D ==
=== Points table ===
Team	Pld	W	L	T	NR	Pts
Sudurpashchim Province	2	2	0	0	0	4
Malaysia Selection XI	2	1	1	0	0	2
Gandaki Province	2	0	2	0	0	0

=== Fixtures ===
11 January 2020
09:00
Scorecard

Malaysia Selection XI; 49 (22 overs)	v	Sudur Paschim Province; 50/2 (7.2 overs)
Virandeep Singh 22 (69); Sher Malla 5/11 (10 overs)		Lokesh Bam 15* (17); Anwar Rahman 1/7 (1 over)

Sudur Paschim Province won by 8 wickets
Inawura, Biratnagar
Umpires: Rabindra Gupta and Sanjay Gurung
Player of the match: Sher Malla (Sudur Paschim Province)

- Malaysia Selection XI won the toss and elected to bat.
- The match was reduced to 47 overs per side due to fog.

12 January 2020
09:00
Scorecard

Gandaki Province; 64 (23.3 overs)	v	Sudur Paschim Province; 67/1 (10.2 overs)
Kishore Mahato 17 (19); Binod Lama 7/14 (9.3 overs)		Gajendra Bohora 34 (31); Deepesh Khatri 1/22 (3.2 overs)

Sudur Paschim Province won by 9 wickets
Inawura, Biratnagar
Umpires: Bhaskar Aryal and Zaidan Taha
Player of the match: Binod Lama (Sudur Paschim Province)

- Gandaki Province won the toss and elected to bat.
- The match was reduced to 47 overs per side due to fog.

13 January 2020
09:00
Scorecard

Malaysia Selection XI; 298/8 (47 overs)	v	Gandaki Province; 106 (27.2 overs)
Ainool Haqqiem 89 (111); Bipin Khatri 3/51 (10 overs)		Bipin Khatri 42 (37); Suharril Fetri 4/29 (7.2 overs)

Malaysia Selection XI won by 192 runs
Inawura, Biratnagar
Umpires: Sanjay Gurung and Mangilal Sharma
Player of the match: Ainool Haqqiem (Malaysia Selection XI)

- Malaysia Selection XI won the toss and elected to bat.
- The match was reduced to 47 overs per side due to fog.

== Semi-finals ==
15 January 2020
09:00
Scorecard

Nepal Army Club; 216 (46.3 overs)	v	Province Number 3; 152 (38.1 overs)
Anil Mandal 43 (73); Gautam KC 4/22 (7.3 overs)		Sonu Tamang 74 (75); Sushan Bhari 3/23 (8.1 overs)

Nepal Army Club won by 64 runs
Inawura, Biratnagar
Umpires: Mangilal Sharma and Zaidan Taha
Player of the match: Kushal Malla (Nepal Army Club)

- Nepal Army Club won the toss and elected to bat.
- The match was reduced to 47 overs per side due to fog.

16 January 2020
09:00
Scorecard

Nepal Police Club; 229 (49 overs)	v	Sudur Paschim Province; 130 (33.4 overs)
Dipendra Singh Airee 68 (76); Sher Malla 3/45 (10 overs)		Kiran Thagunna 39 (46); Sagar Dhakal 5/9 (6.4 overs)

Nepal Police Club won by 99 runs
Inawura, Biratnagar
Umpires: Rabindra Gupta and Sanjay Gurung
Player of the match: Sagar Dhakal (Nepal Police Club)

- Nepal Police Club won the toss and elected to bat.

== Final ==
18 January 2020
09:00
Scorecard

Nepal Army Club; 184 (48.5 overs)	v	Nepal Police Club; 99 (24.4 overs)
Binod Bhandari 40 (66); Dipendra Singh Airee 3/27 (9.5 overs)		Kushal Bhurtel 31 (27); Sushan Bhari 4/24 (6 overs)

Nepal Army Club won by 85 runs
Inawura, Biratnagar
Umpires: Sanjay Gurung and Zaidan Taha
Player of the match: Sushan Bhari (Nepal Army Club)

- Nepal Police Club won the toss and elected to field.
