= 2022 Prime Minister Cup =

Cricket tournament in Nepal

- Dates: 30 October 2022 – 13 November 2022
- Administrator: Cricket Association of Nepal
- Cricket format: One Day
- Tournament format(s): Round-robin and Playoffs
- Host: Nepal
- Champions: Armed Police Force Club (2nd title)
- Runners-up: Tribhuwan Army Club
- Participants: 10
- Matches: 23
- Player of the series: Dipendra Singh Airee (NPC)
- Most runs: Dipendra Singh Airee (NPC); 356 runs
- Most wickets: Mousom Dhakal (APF); 15 wickets

The 2022 Prime Minister Cup was the fifth edition of the Prime Minister One Day Cup, the premier one-day cricket tournament in Nepal. The tournament was contested by teams representing the seven Provinces of Nepal as well as three departmental teams. It began on 30 October 2022 and ended on 12 November 2022. Armed Police Force Club won their second title after defeating defending champions Tribhuwan Army Club in the final.

== Squads ==
The ten participants were divided into two groups.

=== Group A ===
Nepal A.P.F. Club	Tribhuwan Army Club	Gandaki Province	Karnali Province	Sudurpashchim Province
Sharad Vesawkar (c); Pradeep Airee; Aasif Sheikh; Puran BK; Sundeep Jora; Sumit Maharjan; Aayusman Bam; Bhuwan Karki; Amar Singh Rautela; Kamal Singh Airee; Kishore Mahato; Lokesh Bam; Deepak Bohara; Mousom Dhakal	Binod Bhandari (c); Arjun Saud; Hari Chauhan; Bhim Sarki; Rohit Paudel; Rajesh Pulami; Sonu Tamang; Kushal Malla; Sompal Kami; Bikram Sob; Sushan Bhari; Sahab Alam; Aakash Chand; Jitendra Mukhiya	Bipin Khatri (c); Chandra Kant Paudel; Samir Kandel; Bidhan Shrestha; Sachin Raj Adhikari; Arjun Kumal; Sandeep Khatri; Amrit Gurung; Karan Pangeni; Sandesh Basnet; Abhishek Basnet; Subas Bhandari; Krishna Paudel; Kamal Pariyar	Rabindra Jung Shahi (c); Prakash Jaisi; Dipendra Rawat; Himanshu Shahi; Anuj Chanara; Aavash Shah; Dinesh Adhikari; Bipin Rawal; Subodh Airee; Arjun Gharti; Diwan Pun; Bipin Shahi; NischalRawal; Mohan BK	Raju Rijal (c); Basanta Khatri; Narayan Joshi; Sher Malla; Basanta Karki; Hemant Dhami; Milan Bohara; Deepak Tamata; Gajendra Bohara; Birodh Nath; Narendra Saud; Kailash Airee; Tek Rawal; Gajendra Bhandari

=== Group B ===
Nepal Police Club	Bagmati Province	Madhesh Province	Lumbini Province	Koshi Province
Dipendra Singh Airee (c); Aarif Sheikh; Kushal Bhurtel; Dilip Nath; Amit Shrestha; Shankar Rana; Sunil Dhamala; Sagar Dhakal; Lalit Rajbanshi; Yogendra Singh Karki; Rashid Khan; Pawan Sarraf; Karan K.C.; Gulsan Jha	Gyanendra Malla (c); Prithu Baskota; Rit Gautam; Bibek Rana Magar; Durgesh Thapa; Aashutosh Ghoiroiya; Ishan Pandey; Nandan Yadav; Ram Naresh Giri; Pratis GC; Rijan Dhakal; Surya Tamang; Tilakraj Bhandari; Sonu Devkota	Hari Shankar Shah (c); Bibek Yadav; Santosh Karki; Anil Kumar Shah; Ratan Raunak; Dablu Malik; Imran Sheikh; Rohan BK; Bishal Patek; Rupesh Singh; Rajesh Yadav; Mohammad Aadil Alam; Bishal Sushling; Pradeep Paswan	Dev Khanal (c); Basir Ahamad; Prajwal Thapa; Aakash Tripathi; Mohammad Hussein; Sandeep Rajali; Bishal Bikram K.C.; Tul Bahadur Thapa; Krishna Karki; Durgesh Gupta; Sunil Bhandari; Anil Kharel; Naresh Nepali; Abhishek Gautam	Siddhant Lohani (c); Bishal Acharya; Shrawan Yadav; Dipak Raj Joshi; Minash Thapa; Niraj Mukhiya; Ankit Subedi; Sujan Thapaliya; Sonu Mandal; Sonu Ansari; Bibek Mahato; Firdos Ansari; Heman Rai; Labh Kamat

== Venue ==
Kirtipur, Kathmandu
TU International Cricket Ground
Capacity: 25,000+
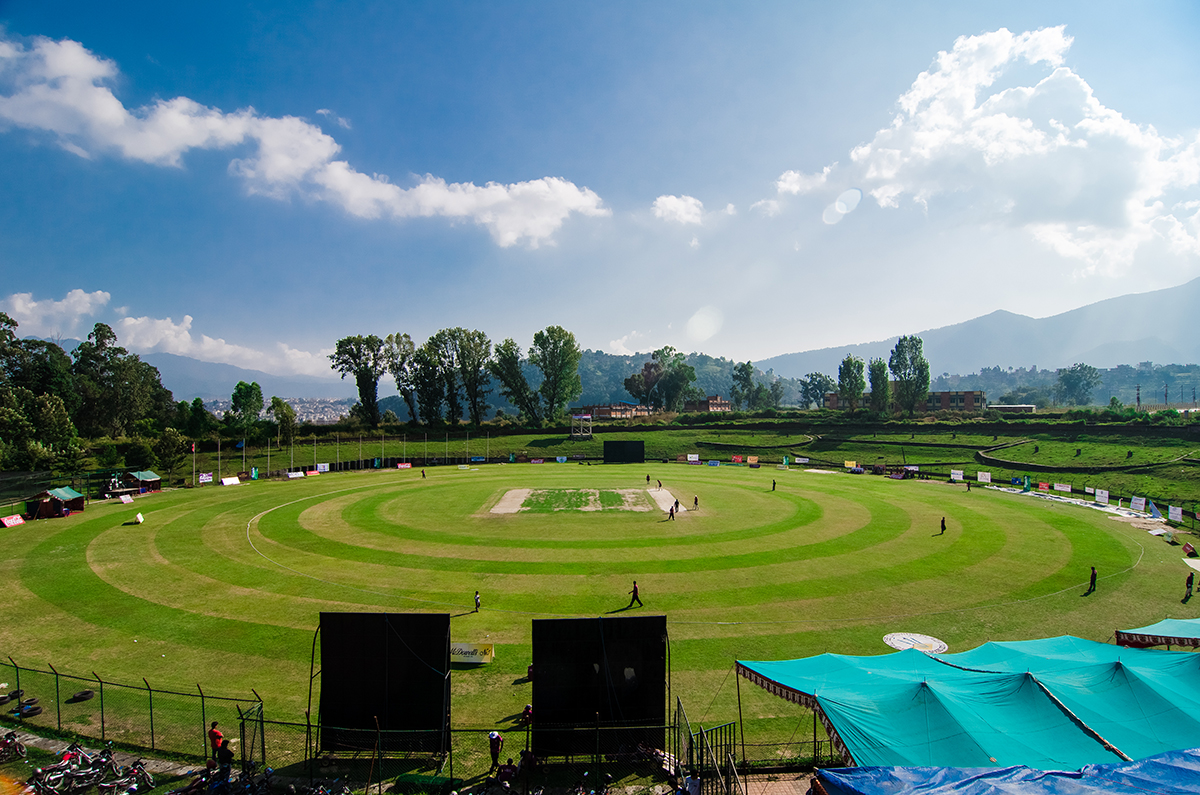
2022 Prime Minister Cup (Nepal)

== Points table ==
=== Group A ===
Team	Pld	W	L	T	NR	Pts	NRR
Armed Police Force Club	4	3	0	1	0	7	+1.258
Tribhuwan Army Club	4	3	1	0	0	6	+1.610
Gandaki Province	4	2	1	1	0	5	+0.166
Sudurpashchim Province	4	1	3	0	0	2	–1.656
Karnali Province	4	0	4	0	0	0	–1.587

The top two teams qualified for the playoffs.
Source: ESPNcricinfo

=== Group B ===
Team	Pld	W	L	T	NR	Pts	NRR
Nepal Police Club	4	4	0	0	0	8	+3.337
Madhesh Province	4	2	1	1	0	5	–0.135
Lumbini Province	4	2	2	0	0	4	–0.265
Koshi Province	4	1	3	0	0	2	–1.151
Bagmati Province	4	0	3	1	0	1	–1.672

The top two teams qualified for the playoffs.
Source: ESPNcricinfo

== Playoffs ==
=== Semi finals ===
Match 21
10 November 2022
09:00
Scorecard

Madhesh Province; 122 (31 overs)	v	Armed Police Force Club; 123/3 (21.3 overs)
Rupesh Singh 36 (23); Kamal Airee 4/27 (9 overs)		Lokesh Bam 35 (35); Rupesh Singh 2/29 (7 overs)

Armed Police Force Club won by 7 wickets
Tribhuvan University International Cricket Ground, Kirtipur
Umpires: Ram Yadav and Vinay Kumar
Player of the match: Kamal Airee

- Armed Police Force Club won the toss and elected to field.

Match 22
11 November 2022
09:00
Scorecard

Nepal Police Club; 304/4 (50 overs)	v	Tribhuwan Army Club; 309/8 (49.5 overs)
Dipendra Singh Airee 140 (125); Bikram Sob 3/66 (10 overs)		Rohit Paudel 89 (87); Karan KC 6/52 (10 overs)

Tribhuwan Army Club won by 2 wickets
Tribhuvan University International Cricket Ground, Kirtipur
Umpires: Himal Giri and Sanjay Gurung
Player of the match: Rajesh Pulami

- Tribhuwan Army Club won the toss and elected to field.

=== Final ===
Match 23
12 November 2022
09:00
Scorecard

Tribhuwan Army Club; 179 (39 overs)	v	Armed Police Force Club; 180/6 (38.3 overs)
Rohit Paudel 49 (56); Mousom Dhakal 3/32 (8 overs)		Bhuwan Karki 55 (82); Jitendra Mukhiya 2/47 (8 overs)

Armed Police Force Club won by 4 wickets
Tribhuvan University International Cricket Ground, Kirtipur
Umpires: Sanjay Gurung and Vinay Kumar
Player of the match: Bhuwan Karki

- Armed Police Force Club won the toss and elected to field.
- Match was reduced to 40 overs per side due to delay.
