= Manmohan Memorial National One-Day Cup =

- Countries: Nepal
- Format: One-day cricket
- First edition: 2020
- Latest edition: 2025
- Next edition: 2026
- Tournament format: Round-robin and Knockout
- Number of teams: 12
- Current champion: Tribhuvan Army Club
- 2025

The Manmohan Memorial National One-Day Cup (MM Cup) is a one-day cricket tournament in Nepal. It is one of two main 50-over tournaments in Nepal, the other being the Prime Minister One Day Cup.

== History ==
Shanti Deep Nepal organised the first Manmohan Memorial National One-Day Cup in January 2019 as one of the premier 50-over domestic cricket tournaments in Nepal, alongside the Prime Minister One Day Cup. The same seven provincial sides and three departmental sides are involved in both tournaments. This event also includes host club MMCC Inaruwa and an invited foreign side. In 2019, the Malaysian national team is competing ahead of a series against Nepal.

== Teams ==
The following teams currently participate in the Manmohan Memorial National One-Day tournament.

Team	Titles	Runner-up
Koshi Province(formerly Province No.1)	0	0
Madhesh Province (formerly Province No.2)	0	0
Bagmati Province (formerly Province No. 3)	0	0
Gandaki Province(formerly Province No. 4)	0	0
Lumbini Province (formerly Province No. 5)	0	0
Karnali Province (formerly Province No. 6)	0	0
Sudurpashchim Province (formerly Province No. 7)	0	0
Nepal Army Club	2	1
Armed Police Force Club	0	0
Nepal Police	1	2
MMCC Inaruwa	0	0

The following teams have featured in the tournament as guests.

Team	Year	Titles	Runner-up
Malaysia Selection XI	2020	0	0
Supaul cricket team (India)	2019	0	0
Assam Cricket Club	2025	0	0

== Tournament history ==
Year	Final Venues	Winner(s)	Runner-up	Semi-Finalists	Ref.
2019 on 5-21 January	Inaruwa Stadium	Nepal Army Club	Nepal Police Club	Province No. 1; Province No. 7	
2020 on 2-18 January	Inaruwa Stadium	Nepal Army Club	Nepal Police Club	Province No. 3; Sudurpaschim Province	
2025 on 26 April – 3 May	Girija Prasad Koirala Cricket Stadium	Nepal Police Club	Nepal Army Club		
2026 TBD					
