= 2018 Prime Minister Cup =

- Dates: 27 May 2018 – 11 June 2018
- Administrator: National Sports Council (Nepal)
- Cricket format: One Day
- Tournament format: Round-robin tournament
- Host: Kathmandu
- Champions: Armed Police Force Club
- Participants: 10
- Matches: 23
- Player of the series: Sagar Pun (TAC)
- Most runs: Pradeep Airee (APF) (315 runs)
- Most wickets: Sushan Bhari (APF); Sompal Kami (TAC) (12 wickets each)

The 2018 Prime Minister Cup was the second edition of Prime Minister One Day Cup, which featured 10 teams.

== Group stage ==
=== Group A ===
Team	Pld	W	L	T	NR	NRR	Pts
Tribhuwan Army Club	4	4	0	0	0	2.357	8
Armed Police Force Club	4	3	1	0	0	1.753	6
Province No. 4	4	1	3	0	0	–0.716	2
Province No. 2	4	1	3	0	0	–1.000	2
Province No. 1	4	1	3	0	0	–1.889	2

=== Group B ===
Team	Pld	W	L	T	NR	NRR	Pts
Nepal Police Club	4	3	0	0	1	2.012	7
Province No. 5	4	2	1	0	1	1.527	5
Province No. 7	4	2	1	0	1	-0.691	5
Province No. 3	4	1	3	0	0	–0.126	2
Province No. 6	4	0	3	0	1	–1.700	1

=== Semi-finals ===
8 June
9:00
Scorecard

Tribhuwan Army Club; 289/8 (50 overs)	v	Province No. 5; 135 (35.5 overs)
Sagar Pun 118 (142); Krishna Karki 3/55 (10 overs)		Krishna Karki 31 (29); Sushan Bhari 3/13 (5 overs)

Army won by 154 runs
TU Cricket Ground, Kirtipur
Umpires: Vinay Kumar Jha and Himal Giri
Player of the match: Sagar Pun (Army)

- Province No. 5 won the toss and elected to field.

9 June
9:00
Scorecard

Armed Police Force Club; 208 (48.5 overs)	v	Nepal Police Club; 131/9 (28 overs)
Anil Kumar Sah 45 (79); Dipendra Singh Airee 3/41 (10 overs)		Kushal Bhurtel 30 (30); Amar Singh Routela 3/30 (5 overs)

APF Club won by 9 runs (D/L method)
Mulpani Cricket Stadium, Kathmandu
Umpires: Durga Subedi and Sanjay Gurung
Player of the match: Amar Singh Routela (APF Club)

- APF Club won the toss and elected to bat.
- Nepal Police Club's innings was reduced to 28 overs due to rain, and were set a target of 141 to win.

=== Final ===
11 June
9:00
Scorecard

Tribhuwan Army Club; 209 (50 overs)	v	Armed Police Force Club; 210/4 (41.2 overs)
Bhim Sarki 45 (48); Karan KC 3/38 (10 overs)		Anil Kumar Sah 63 (72); Sompal Kami 3/67 (8.2 overs)

APF Club won by 6 wickets
TU Cricket Ground, Kirtipur
Umpires: Vinay Kumar Jha and Durga Subedi
Player of the match: Anil Kumar Sah (APF Club)

- Army won the toss and elected to bat.

== Statistics ==
=== Most runs ===
Player	Team	Mat	Inns	NO	Runs	Avge	HS	100	50
Pradeep Airee	Armed Police Force Club	6	6	0	315	52.50	158	1	1
Sagar Pun	Tribhuwan Army Club	6	6	0	211	35.16	118	1	0
Binod Bhandari	Tribhuwan Army Club	6	5	0	209	41.80	64	0	2
Anil Mandal	Tribhuwan Army Club	6	6	1	209	41.80	72	0	1
Subash Khakurel	Armed Police Force Club	6	5	1	208	52.00	103	1	0

=== Most wickets ===
Player	Team	Mat	Overs	Runs	Wkts	Avge	BBI	SR	4WI	5WI
Sushan Bhari	Tribhuwan Army Club	6	40.2	110	12	9.16	4/15	20.1	1	0
Sompal Kami	Tribhuwan Army Club	6	38.2	215	12	17.91	3/37	19.1	0	0
Sher Malla	Province No. 7	4	26.2	98	11	8.90	5/21	14.3	1	1
Sagar Pun	Tribhuwan Army Club	6	51.0	176	11	16.00	3/14	27.8	0	0
Karan KC	Armed Police Force Club	6	48.0	205	11	18.63	3/30	26.1	0	0
