= 2017 Prime Minister Cup =

- Administrator: National Sports Council
- Cricket format: One day cricket
- Tournament format(s): Round-robin and knockout
- Champions: Nepal Police Club and Tribhuwan Army Club (joint winners)
- Participants: 8
- Matches: 15
- Player of the series: Sagar Pun (TAC)

The 2017 Prime Minister Cup was the first edition of the Prime Minister One Day Cup featuring eight teams. Nepal Police Club and Tribhuwan Army Club were announced as joint winners as the final went to no result due to rain.

== Venue ==
Kirtipur, Kathmandu
TU International Cricket Ground
Capacity: 25,000+
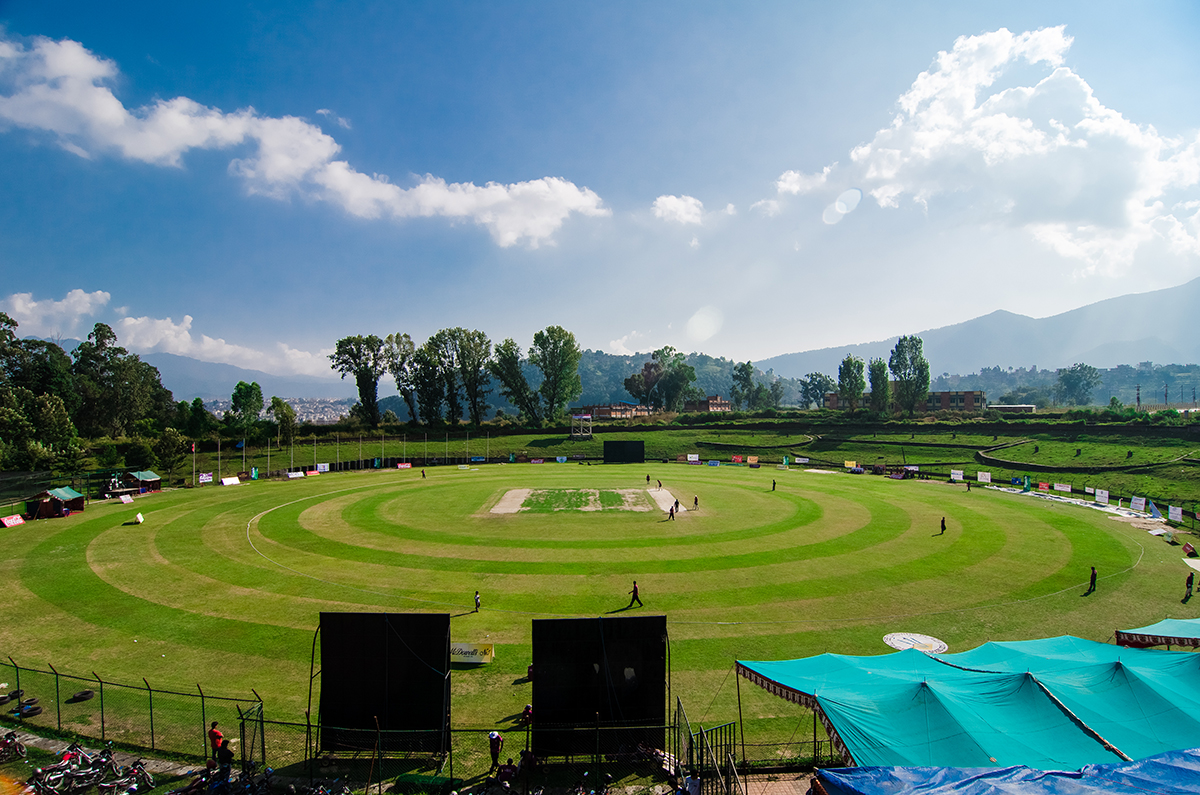
2017 Prime Minister Cup (Nepal)

== Teams ==
- Eastern Development Region
- Central Development Region
- Western Development Region
- Mid-Western Development Region
- Far Western Development Region
- Nepal Police Club
- Tribhuwan Army Club
- Armed Police Force Club

== Group stage ==
=== Group A ===
Team	Pld	W	L	T	NR	NRR	Pts
Armed Police Force Club	3	3	0	0	0	2.145	6
Western Development Region	3	2	1	0	0	2.282	4
Central Development Region	3	0	2	0	1	–1.703	1
Mid Western Development Region	3	0	2	0	1	–3.899	1

=== Group B ===
Team	Pld	W	L	T	NR	NRR	Pts
Tribhuwan Army Club	3	3	0	0	0	3.107	6
Nepal Police Club	3	2	1	0	0	1.249	4
Eastern Development Region	3	0	2	0	1	–3.846	1
Far Western Development Region	3	0	2	0	1	–4.994	1

== Semi-finals ==
5 June 2017
09:00
Scorecard

Nepal Police Club; 252/9 (50 overs)	v	Armed Police Force Club; 138/6 (28.3 overs)
Kushal Bhurtel 52 (69); Anil Sah 3/39 (9 overs)		Gyanendra Malla 45 (35); Lalit Rajbanshi 3/31 (10 overs)

Nepal Police Club won by 34 runs (DLS method)
Tribhuvan University International Cricket Ground, Kirtipur
Umpires: Himal Giri and Ram Yadav
Player of the match: Kushal Bhurtel (Nepal Police Club)

- Armed Police Force Club won the toss and elected to field.
- No further play was possible due to rain.

6 June 2017
09:00
Scorecard

Western Development Region; 235/9 (49 overs)	v	Tribhuwan Army Club; 241/6 (48.2 overs)
Saurav Khanal 82 (86); Jitendra Mukhiya 2/38 (10 overs)		Sagar Pun 65 (79); Dhiraj Shahi 2/42 (8 overs)

Tribhuwan Army Club won by 4 wickets
Tribhuvan University International Cricket Ground, Kirtipur
Umpires: Durga Subedi and Ram Yadav
Player of the match: Rajesh Pulami (Tribhuwan Army Club)

- Tribhuwan Army Club won the toss and elected to field.
- The match was reduced to 49 overs per side.

== Final ==
8 June 2017
09:00
Scorecard

Nepal Police Club; 126 (45.1 overs)	v	Tribhuwan Army Club; 7/1 (2.3 overs)
Sunil Dhamala 32 (90); Jitendra Mukhiya 4/28 (8.1 overs)		Mahesh Chhetri 4 (9); Lalit Bhandari 1/5 (1.3 overs)

No result
Tribhuvan University International Cricket Ground, Kirtipur
Umpires: Himal Giri and Ram Yadav

- Tribhuwan Army Club won the toss and elected to field.
- No further play was possible due to rain.
- The trophy was shared.
