= Prime Minister Cup Men's National Cricket Tournament =

Annual Nepali cricket tournament

- Countries: Nepal
- Administrator: Cricket Association of Nepal
- Format: One-day cricket
- First edition: 2017
- Latest edition: 2026
- Next edition: 2027
- Tournament format: Round-robin
- Number of teams: 10
- Current champion: Tribhuwan Army Club (3rd title)
- Most successful: Nepal Police Club (4 titles)
- Qualification: Jay Trophy
- Most runs: Binod Bhandari (1824)
- Most wickets: Lalit Rajbanshi (125)
- Website: cricketnepal.org.np

The Prime Minister Cup Men's National Cricket Tournament (Nepali: प्रधानमन्त्री कप पुरुष राष्ट्रिय क्रिकेट प्रतियोगिता) is a premier domestic One-day cricket tournament in Nepal. It was organised annually by the Cricket Association of Nepal. This tournament featured 10 teams which are 7 Provincial teams and 3 Departmental teams.

The teams represent the seven provinces of Nepal, and three departmental teams. The current champions are Nepal Police Club.

== History ==
The first edition of the Prime Minister Cup was organised in 2017 by the National Sports Council following the suspension of the Cricket Association of Nepal by International Cricket Council. It was the nation’s top-tier domestic cricket league, boasting the largest prize pool. The inaugural edition ended in a shared title between Nepal Police Club and Tribhuvan Army Club after rain disrupted the final. All matches were played at Tribhuvan University Cricket Ground in a round-robin group format, with each group containing 4 teams.

The 2024 edition brought a significant format change, scrapping the group system entirely. Now the top two teams qualify for the final while the top four qualify for the newly introduced Jay Trophy. This was also the first edition where matches were played outside of TU Cricket Ground, with games held at Mulpani Cricket Ground and Siddhartha Cricket Stadium.

In 2026, the qualification spots for the Jay Trophy were increased to six. This edition also marked the first appearance of a provincial team in the final, where Sudurpaschim ultimately fell to Tribhuvan Army Club by five wickets.

== Tournament format ==
The inaugural edition had eight teams, five regional teams and three departmental teams, competing in two round-robin groups with the top two teams from each group advancing to the semi-finals. All matches were played in the one-day format. The following season the five regional teams were replaced by teams representing the seven provinces, taking the number of teams to ten.

The format was changed for the 2024 season, with the ten teams competing in a round-robin format and the top two teams qualifying for the final. The top four teams also qualify for the multi-day Jay Trophy.

== Teams ==
The following ten teams currently participate in the Prime Minister One Day Cup.

Team	First season	Titles	Runner-up	First title	Last title
Koshi Province (Note: Formerly Province No. 1, renamed from 2024 season)	2018	0	0	—N/a	—N/a
Madhesh Province (Note: Formerly Province No. 2, renamed from 2022 season)	2018	0	0	—N/a	—N/a
Bagmati Province (Note: Formerly Province No. 3, renamed from 2021 season)	2018	0	0	—N/a	—N/a
Gandaki Province (Note: Formerly Province No. 4, renamed from 2019 season)	2018	0	0	—N/a	—N/a
Lumbini Province (Note: Formerly Province No. 5, renamed from 2021 season)	2018	0	0	—N/a	—N/a
Karnali Province (Note: Formerly Province No. 6, renamed from 2019 season)	2018	0	0	—N/a	—N/a
Sudurpashchim Province (Note: Formerly Province No. 7, renamed from 2019 season)	2018	0	1	—N/a	—N/a
Tribhuwan Army Club	2017	3	5	2017	2026
Nepal APF Club	2017	2	1	2018	2022
Nepal Police Club	2017	4	0	2017	2025

=== Defunct teams ===
The following teams also appeared in the Prime Minister Cup.

- Eastern Development Region (2017)
- Central Development Region (2017)
- Western Development Region (2017)
- Mid-Western Development Region (2017)
- Far-Western Development Region (2017)

== Winners ==
Season	Final		Most runs	Most wickets	Player of the tournament	Ref
Season	Winner	Runner-up	Most runs	Most wickets	Player of the tournament	Ref
2017	Nepal Police Club, Tribhuwan Army Club (Note: The trophy was shared after the final ended in a no result.)	N/A	Saurav Khanal (Western)	Sushan Bhari (TAC); Sagar Pun (TAC)	Sagar Pun (TAC)	
2018	Armed Police Force Club	Tribhuwan Army Club	Pradeep Airee (APF)	Sushan Bhari (TAC), Sompal Kami (TAC)	Sagar Pun (TAC)	
2019	Nepal Police Club	Tribhuwan Army Club	Raju Rijal (TAC)	Lalit Rajbanshi (NPC)	Lalit Rajbanshi (NPC)	
2021	Tribhuwan Army Club	Armed Police Force Club	Prithu Baskota (Bagmati)	Abinash Bohara (APF)	Kamal Airee (APF)	
2022	Armed Police Force Club	Tribhuwan Army Club	Dipendra Singh Airee (NPC)	Mousom Dhakal (APF)	Dipendra Singh Airee (NPC)	
2024	Nepal Police Club	Tribhuwan Army Club	Anil Sah (Madhesh)	Surya Tamang (Bagmati)	Surya Tamang (Bagmati)	
2025	Nepal Police Club	Tribhuwan Army Club	Arjun Kumal (Gandaki)	Lalit Rajbanshi (NPC)	Lalit Rajbanshi (NPC)	
2026	Tribhuwan Army Club	Sudurpashchim Province	Arjun Kumal (Gandaki)	Hemant Dhami (Sudurpaschim)	Santosh Yadav (Lumbini)	

== Team's performance ==
=== Seasons ===
Season (No. of teams)	2017 (8)	2018 (10)	2019 (10)	2021 (10)	2022 (10)	2024 (10)	2025 (10)	2026 (10)
Bagmati Province	—	GS	SF	SF	GS	GS	GS	GS
Gandaki Province	—	GS	GS	GS	GS	GS	GS	GS
Karnali Province	—	GS	GS	GS	GS	GS	GS	GS
Lumbini Province	—	SF	GS	GS	GS	GS	GS	GS
Nepal APF Club	SF	C	SF	RU	C	GS	GS	GS
Nepal Police Club	C	SF	C	SF	SF	C	C	GS
Koshi Province	—	GS	GS	GS	GS	GS	GS	GS
Madhesh Province	—	GS	GS	GS	SF	GS	GS	GS
Sudurpashchim Province	—	GS	GS	GS	GS	GS	GS	RU
Tribhuwan Army Club	C	RU	RU	C	RU	RU	RU	C
Eastern Development Region^{†}	GS	—						
Central Development Region^{†}	GS	—						
Western Development Region^{†}	SF	—						
Mid-Western Development Region^{†}	GS	—						
Far Western Development Region^{†}	GS	—						

^{†} Team now defunct

- C: Champions
- RU: Runner-up
- SF: Semi-final
- GS – Group stage

== Records and statistics ==
Batting Records
Most runs	Binod Bhandari (Army)	1,824
Highest average	Arjun Kumal (Gandaki)	47.52 (Note: Minimum 20 innings played)
Best strike rate	Aasif Sheikh (APF)	104.07
Highest score	Aasif Sheikh (APF)	208 vs Madhesh (13 April 2026)
Highest partnership	Subash Khakurel & Pradeep Airee (APF)	231 vs Province 2 (4 June 2018)
Most hundreds	Binod Bhandari (Army)	5
Most fifties (and over)	Rohit Paudel (APF/Army/Western)	12
Most runs in a series	Arjun Kumal (Gandaki)	504( 2026)
Bowling Records
Most wickets	Lalit Rajbanshi (Police)	125
Lowest average	Lalit Rajbanshi (Police)	11.36 (Note: Minimum 1,000 balls bowled)
Best strike rate	Lalit Rajbanshi (Police)	19.42
Best economy rate	Bhuvan Karki (APF)	3.27
Best bowling figures	Hemant Dhami (Sudurpaschim)	7/14 vs Bagmati (5 April 2026)
Most five-wickets-in-an-innings	Lalit Rajbanshi (Police)	14
Most wickets in a series	Lalit Rajbanshi (Police)	41 (2025)
Fielding
Most dismissals (wicket-keeper)	Raju Rijal (Sudurpashchim/Army)	47
Most catches (fielder)	Sandeep Jora (APF)	41
Team records
Highest total	APF	390/5 vs Madhesh (13 April 2026)
Lowest total	Koshi	25 vs Gandaki (21 January 2024)

== See also ==
- Jay Trophy
- National T20 Championship
- Prime Minister Cup Women's National Tournament
