= Papua New Guinean cricket team in Oman in 2021–22 =

International cricket tour

The Papua New Guinea cricket team toured Oman in September 2021 to play two One Day International (ODI) matches against Nepal and two ODI matches against the United States. The matches were used as preparation for all three teams ahead of the Cricket World Cup League 2 series, also in Oman, which started on 13 September 2021 and 25 September 2021 respectively.

In the first round of matches, the United States beat Papua New Guinea by seven wickets, with Nepal beating Papua New Guinea by two wickets in the second match. The United States won their second match against Papua New Guinea by 134 runs, with Jaskaran Malhotra scoring the first century for the United States in an ODI match. The final match saw Nepal beat Papua New Guinea by 151 runs, leaving Papua New Guinea winless across all four matches.

== Squads ==
Nepal	Papua New Guinea	United States
Gyanendra Malla (c); Dipendra Singh Airee (vc); Binod Bhandari; Sushan Bhari; Kushal Bhurtel; Abinash Bohara; Gulsan Jha; Sompal Kami; Karan KC; Sandeep Lamichhane; Kushal Malla; Rohit Paudel; Pawan Sarraf; Aarif Sheikh; Aasif Sheikh; Bikram Sob; Sharad Vesawkar	Assad Vala (c); Charles Amini; Simon Atai; Sese Bau; Kiplin Doriga; Jack Gardner; Hiri Hiri; Jason Kila; Kabua Morea; Nosaina Pokana; Damien Ravu; Lega Siaka; Chad Soper; Gaudi Toka; Tony Ura; Norman Vanua	Saurabh Netravalkar (c); Aaron Jones (vc); Karima Gore; Elmore Hutchinson; Nosthush Kenjige; Jaskaran Malhotra; Sushant Modani; Abhishek Paradkar; Monank Patel; Nisarg Patel; Dominique Rikhi; Gajanand Singh; Jasdeep Singh; Steven Taylor

The United States also named Kyle Phillip as a travelling reserve player for the tour.

== United States vs Papua New Guinea ==
PNG cricket team against the US in Oman in 2021–22
	United States	Papua New Guinea
- Dates: 6 – 9 September 2021
Captains	Saurabh Netravalkar	Assad Vala

One Day International series
- Results: United States won the 2-match series 2–0
Most runs	Jaskaran Malhotra (176)	Assad Vala (61)
Most wickets	Nisarg Patel (5)	Damien Ravu (3)

=== 1st ODI ===
6 September 2021
09:30
Scorecard

Papua New Guinea; 158 (44.2 overs)	v	United States; 159/3 (28.2 overs)
Assad Vala 61 (74); Nisarg Patel 4/30 (10 overs)		Steven Taylor 82 (55); Damien Ravu 1/28 (5 overs)

United States won by 7 wickets
Oman Cricket Academy Ground Turf 2, Muscat
Umpires: Rahul Asher (Oma) and Ahmed Shah Pakteen (Afg)
Player of the match: Steven Taylor (USA)

- Papua New Guinea won the toss and elected to bat.
- Sushant Modani and Gajanand Singh (USA) both made their ODI debuts.

=== 2nd ODI ===
9 September 2021
14:30 (D/N)
Scorecard

United States; 271/9 (50 overs)	v	Papua New Guinea; 137 (37.1 overs)
Jaskaran Malhotra 173* (124); Chad Soper 2/41 (10 overs)		Norman Vanua 30 (26); Abhishek Paradkar 4/26 (9 overs)

United States won by 134 runs
Oman Cricket Academy Ground Turf 1, Muscat
Umpires: Vinod Babu (Oma) and Ahmed Shah Pakteen (Afg)
Player of the match: Jaskaran Malhotra (USA)

- Papua New Guinea won the toss and elected to field.
- Abhishek Paradkar (USA) made his ODI debut.
- Jaskaran Malhotra became the first cricketer for the United States to score a century in ODIs.
- Jaskaran Malhotra also hit six sixes in one over, off the bowling of Gaudi Toka, becoming the second cricketer to achieve this in ODIs.

== Nepal vs Papua New Guinea ==
PNG cricket team against Nepal in Oman in 2021–22
	Nepal	Papua New Guinea
- Dates: 7 – 10 September 2021
Captains	Gyanendra Malla	Assad Vala

One Day International series
- Results: Nepal won the 2-match series 2–0
Most runs	Rohit Paudel (127)	Charles Amini (39)
Most wickets	Sandeep Lamichhane (10)	Chad Soper (5)

=== 1st ODI ===
7 September 2021
09:30
Scorecard

Papua New Guinea; 134 (33 overs)	v	Nepal; 135/8 (39.3 overs)
Lega Siaka 30 (38); Sandeep Lamichhane 4/35 (10 overs)		Rohit Paudel 41 (65); Gaudi Toka 3/18 (4.3 overs)

Nepal won by 2 wickets
Oman Cricket Academy Ground Turf 2, Muscat
Umpires: Ahmed Shah Pakteen (Afg) and Harikrishna Pillai (Oma)
Player of the match: Sandeep Lamichhane (Nep)

- Papua New Guinea won the toss and elected to bat.
- Kushal Bhurtel, Aasif Sheikh and Bikram Sob (Nep) all made their ODI debuts.
- Bikram Sob (Nep) took a wicket with his first ball in ODIs.

=== 2nd ODI ===
10 September 2021
14:30 (D/N)
Scorecard

Nepal; 233 (49.3 overs)	v	Papua New Guinea; 82 (19.1 overs)
Rohit Paudel 86 (123); Chad Soper 3/45 (9 overs)		Tony Ura 19 (35); Sandeep Lamichhane 6/11 (5.1 overs)

Nepal won by 151 runs
Oman Cricket Academy Ground Turf 1, Muscat
Umpires: Rahul Asher (Oma) and Ahmed Shah Pakteen (Afg)
Player of the match: Sandeep Lamichhane (Nep)

- Nepal won the toss and elected to bat.
- Kabua Morea (PNG) made his ODI debut.
