= One-Day Cup =

One-Day Cup may refer to the following cricket competitions:

- One-Day Cup (Australia)
- One-Day Cup (England), in England and Wales
- Women's One-Day Cup, in England and Wales
- Manmohan Memorial National One-Day Cup, in Nepal
- Champions One-Day Cup, in Pakistan
- Pakistan Women's One-Day Cup
- CSA One-Day Cup, in South Africa
- CSA Women's One-Day Cup, in South Africa

== See also ==
- ECB National Club Cricket Championship, in England
- National One Day Championship, in Pakistan
- One Day International
- Women's One Day International
