= Kiran Thagunna =

Nepalese cricketer (born 1997)

Personal information
- Full name: Kiran Kumar Thagunna
- Born: 23 July 1997 (age 29); Baitadi, Nepal
- Batting: Right-handed
- Bowling: Right-arm off break

International information
- National side: Nepal (2025)
- T20I debut (cap 51): 16 June 2025 v Netherlands
- Last T20I: 17 June 2025 v Scotland
- T20I shirt no.: 99

Domestic team information
- Years: Team
- 2024-present: Pokhara Avengers

Career statistics
Competition	T20I
Matches	2
Runs scored	25
Batting average	12.50
100s/50s	0/0
Top score	15
Catches/stumpings
- Source: Cricinfo, 23 December 2025

Kiran Thagunna (born 23 July 1997) is a Nepalese cricketer who plays as a right-handed batsman and occasional right-arm off break bowler. He made his T20I debut for Nepal against the Netherlands on 16 June 2025. He has represented the Sudurpaschim Province cricket team in domestic competitions. During the 2025 Prime Minister's Cup, he scored two centuries, including an innings of 121 runs against Gandaki and another century against Koshi, becoming the third batter to record two centuries in a single edition of the tournament.

== Franchise cricket ==
He played for the Pokhara Avengers in the Nepal Premier League during the inaugural season and the second season.
