= Sushant Modani =

American cricketer (born 1989)

Personal information
- Full name: Sushant Jayachandra Modani
- Born: 5 January 1989 (age 37); Jalna, Maharashtra, India
- Batting: Right-handed
- Bowling: Right-arm offbreak
- Role: Batsman

International information
- National side: United States
- ODI debut (cap 32): 6 September 2021 v PNG
- Last ODI: 31 October 2023 v Scotland
- T20I debut (cap 24): 22 December 2021 v Ireland
- Last T20I: 14 July 2022 v Zimbabwe

Domestic team information
- Years: Team
- 2021: Houston Hurricanes

Career statistics
Competition	ODI	T20I
Matches	34	5
Runs scored	900	93
Batting average	26.47	31.00
100s/50s	1/6	–/1
Top score	111	50
Balls bowled	12	6
Wickets	0	1
Bowling average	–	2.00
5 wickets in innings	0	0
10 wickets in match	0	0
Best bowling	–/–	1/2
Catches/stumpings	3/–	2/–
- Source: Cricinfo, 1 November 2024

Sushant Jayachandra Modani (born 5 January 1989) is an Indian-born American cricketer who plays for the United States cricket team. In June 2021, he was selected to take part in the Minor League Cricket tournament in the United States following the players' draft. In August 2021, Modani was named in the United States' One Day International (ODI) squad for the rescheduled tri-series in Oman and their matches against Papua New Guinea. He made his ODI debut on 6 September 2021, for the United States against Papua New Guinea. He made his T20I debut on 22 December 2021, for the United States against Ireland.
