= Abhishek Paradkar =

American cricketer (born 2000)

Personal information
- Full name: Abhishek Ashish Paradkar
- Born: November 8, 2000 (age 26); San Diego, California, US
- Batting: Left-handed
- Bowling: Left-arm medium-fast
- Role: Batsman

International information
- National side: United States
- ODI debut (cap 34): 9 September 2021 v PNG
- Last ODI: 21 August 2024 v Netherlands
- T20I debut (cap 42): 30 September 2024 v UAE
- Last T20I: 5 October 2024 v Namibia

Domestic team information
- Years: Team
- 2025-Present: Washington Freedom
- Source: Cricinfo, 5 November 2024

Abhishek Paradkar (born November 8, 2000) is an American cricketer who plays for the United States cricket team. and for Washington Freedom in Major League Cricket. In June 2021, he was selected to take part in the Minor League Cricket tournament in the United States following the players' draft. In August 2021, Paradkar was named in the United States' One Day International (ODI) squad for the rescheduled tri-series in Oman and their matches against Papua New Guinea. He made his ODI debut on September 9, 2021, for the United States against Papua New Guinea.
