= Anil Sah =

Nepalese cricketer

Personal information
- Full name: Anil Kumar Sah
- Born: 17 November 1998 (age 27); Kalaiya, Bara, Nepal
- Height: 5 ft 8 in (1.73 m)
- Batting: Right-handed
- Bowling: Right-arm off break
- Role: Wicket-keeper-batter

International information
- National side: Nepal (2018–present)
- ODI debut (cap 8): 1 August 2018 v Netherlands
- Last ODI: 10 June 2025 v Netherlands
- ODI shirt no.: 16
- T20I debut (cap 22): 29 July 2018 v Netherlands
- Last T20I: 17 June 2025 v Scotland
- T20I shirt no.: 16

Domestic team information
- Years: Team
- 2017 – 2018: Nepal APF Club
- 2019 – 2021: Nepal Police Club
- 2022 – Present: Madhesh Province
- 2024 – present: Janakpur Bolts

Career statistics
Competition	ODI	T20I	LA
Matches	17	14	22
Runs scored	403	218	453
Batting average	26.86	16.76	22.65
100s/50s	1/4	0/0	1/4
Top score	112*	41	112*
Catches/stumpings	/0	10/0	10/1
- Source: Cricinfo, 23 April 2026

Anil Kumar Sah (born 17 November 1998) is a Nepalese cricketer who plays for Nepal national team as a wicket-keeper batter. He made his List A debut for Nepal in the 2018 ICC World Cricket League Division Two tournament on 12 February 2018. He was one of the eleven cricketers to play in Nepal's first ever One Day International (ODI) match, against the Netherlands, in August 2018.

== International career ==
In July 2018, he was named in Nepal's squad for their One Day International (ODI) series against the Netherlands. These were Nepal's first ODI matches since gaining ODI status during the 2018 Cricket World Cup Qualifier. He made his Twenty20 debut for Nepal in the 2018 MCC Tri-Nation Series against the Marylebone Cricket Club on 29 July 2018. He made his Twenty20 International (T20I) on the same day, against the Netherlands. He made his ODI debut for Nepal against the Netherlands on 1 August 2018.

In August 2018, he was named in Nepal's squad for the 2018 Asia Cup Qualifier tournament. In October 2018, he was named in Nepal's squad in the Eastern sub-region group for the 2018–19 ICC World Twenty20 Asia Qualifier tournament.

Anil was called back to the national team to play the home series against Canada. He scored the most runs in the tournament playing for Madhesh Province. He scored 50 runs off just 19 balls in the first 2nd ODI of the tournament. It was the fastest ODI fifty for a Nepali batsman beating previous record of Aasif Sheikh's 50 off 21 balls against PNG in 2023.

Sah scored his first ton in ODI in his second appearance following the comeback against Canada in the 3rd ODI of the tournament. He scored 112* off 124 balls and won the player of the match. His comeback story is something that will be heard for many years in the history of Nepal cricket, as the commentator said during the match.

In May 2024, he was named in Nepal's squad for the 2024 ICC Men's T20 World Cup tournament.

== Domestic ==
In November 2022, Sah started playing for Madhesh Province leaving previous Nepal Police Club. He played inning of 61 runs with five fours and a six against Province No. 1 in PM Cup 2022. Anil scored the most runs in the 2024 Prime Minister Cup scoring 386 runs for Madhesh Province that led to his call up for the national team to play against the visitor Canada.

Sah was signed by Janakpur Bolts for the inaugural 2024 Nepal Premier League. He was appointed as the team captain and led the franchise to the title as they defeated Sudurpaschim Royals by five wickets in the final to become the first-ever NPL champions.
