= Bikram Sob =

Nepalese cricketer (born 1992)

Personal information
- Born: 5 July 1992 (age 34); Kanchanpur, Nepal
- Batting: Right-handed
- Bowling: Right-arm fast-medium
- Role: Bowler

International information
- National side: Nepal (2021-2022)
- ODI debut (cap 26): 7 September 2021 v PNG
- Last ODI: 21 March 2022 v UAE
- Source: Cricinfo, 21 March 2022

Bikram Sob (born 5 July 1992) is a Nepalese cricketer. In August 2021, he was named in Nepal's One Day International (ODI) squad for their series against Papua New Guinea in Oman, and their squad for round six of the 2019–2023 ICC Cricket World Cup League 2 tournament, also in Oman. He made his ODI debut on 7 September 2021, for Nepal against Papua New Guinea, and took a wicket with his first ball in an ODI match.
