= Tribhuwan Army Club cricket team =

Army sporting club of Nepal

Personnel
- Captain: Binod Bhandari
- Coach: Arun Aryal
- Owner: Nepal Army Club

Team information
- Colours: Dark Green
- Founded: 2010; 16 years ago
- Home ground: Tribhuvan University International Cricket Ground
- Capacity: 25, 000

History
- No. of titles: 3
- PM Cup wins: 3 (2017, 2021, 2026)
- Jay Trophy wins: 0
- Official website: www.nepalarmy.mil.np

The Tribhuwan Army Club cricket team also known as Nepal Army Club is one of the three departmental teams of Nepal. The team competes in Prime Minister Cup and Jay Trophy.The team is currently being run under the Nepal Army Club.

== Statistics and honours ==
- Prime Minister Cup Men's National Cricket Tournament
  - Winners (3): 2017, (Note: The trophy was shared after the final ended in a no result.) 2021, 2026
- Manmohan Memorial National One-Day Cup
  - Winners (2): 2018–19, 2020
- Koshi Province Trophy
  - Winners (1): 2024

== Current Squad ==
As of 19 Feb 2026

Tribhuwan Army Club Cricket Team Squad for 2025
Name	Nationality	Age	Batting style	Bowling style	NPL Team	Notes
Batsman
Bhim Sharki	Nepal	25	Right-handed	Right-arm off break	Kathmandu Gorkhas	—N/a
Trit Raj Das	Nepal	23	Right-handed	Right-arm medium	Pokhara Avengers	—N/a
Imran Sheikh	Nepal	20	Right-handed	Right-arm off break	Karnali Yaks	—N/a
Santosh Karki	Nepal	23	Right-handed	Left-arm off break	—N/a	—N/a
Pawan Karki	Nepal	28	Right-handed	Right-arm off break	—N/a	—N/a
Wicket-keeper
Binod Bhandari	Nepal	36	Right-handed	—N/a	Sudurpaschim Royals	Captain
All-rounder
Kushal Malla	Nepal	22	Left-handed	Left-arm orthodox spin	Chitwan Rhinos	—N/a
Bibek Yadav	Nepal	22	Right-handed	Right-arm fast medium	Lumbini Lions	—N/a
Basir Ahamad	Nepal	22	Left-handed	Left-arm orthodox spin	Biratnagar Kings	—N/a
Spin Bowler
Shahab Alam	Nepal	27	Left-handed	Left-arm orthodox spin	Kathmandu Gorkhas	—N/a
Naren Saud	Nepal	20	Left-handed	Left-arm orthodox spin	Sudurpaschim Royals	—N/a
Anish Dhami	Nepal		Right-handed		—N/a	—N/a
Pace Bowler
Sompal Kami	Nepal	30	Right-handed	Right-arm fast medium	Karnali Yaks	—N/a
Aakash Chand	Nepal	21	Right-handed	Right-arm fast medium	Pokhara Avengers	—N/a
Durgesh Gupta	Nepal	21	Right-handed	Left-arm fast medium	Lumbini Lions	—N/a
