= Sanjay Gurung =

Nepalese cricket umpire

Personal information
- Born: 4 May 1969 (age 57); Bhairahawa, Rupandehi District, Lumbini Province, Nepal
- Role: Umpire

Umpiring information
- ODIs umpired: 1 (2023)
- T20Is umpired: 10 (2020–2023)
- WT20Is umpired: 2 (2022)
- Source: Cricinfo, 27 October 2023

Sanjay Gurung (born 4 May 1969) is a Nepalese cricket umpire. As of October 2023, Gurung has umpired in 16 international fixtures, including a One Day International match, 11 Twenty20 Internationals (T20Is) and one women's T20I.
