= List of Nepal ODI cricketers =

A One Day International (ODI) is an international cricket match between two representative teams, each having ODI status, as determined by the International Cricket Council (ICC). An ODI differs from Test matches in that the number of overs per team is limited, and that each team has only one innings. Nepal earned One Day International (ODI) in 2018 as a result of their performances at the 2018 Cricket World Cup Qualifier. Nepal played their first ODI against the Netherlands national cricket team on 1 August 2018.

The list is arranged in the order in which each player won his first ODI cap. Where more than one player won his first ODI cap in the same match, those players are listed alphabetically by surname.

== Key ==
General

- ‡ – Captain
- † – Wicket-keeper
- First – Year of debut
- Last – Year of latest game
- Mat – Number of matches played

Batting

- Runs – Runs scored in career
- HS – Highest score
- Avg – Runs scored per dismissal
- * – Batsman remained not out
- 100 – Number of centuries scored
- 50 – Number of half centuries scored

Bowling

- Balls – Balls bowled in career
- Wkt – Wickets taken in career
- BBI – Best bowling in an innings
- Ave – Average runs per wicket
- 5WI – Five wickets or more in a match

Fielding

- Ca – Catches taken
- St – Stumpings taken

== Players ==
Statistics are correct as of 19 October 2026.

Nepal ODI cricketers
General					Batting					Bowling					Fielding		Ref
No.	Name	First	Last	Mat	Runs	HS	Avg	50	100	Balls	Wkt	BBI	Ave	5WI	Ca	St	Ref
1	Aarif Sheikh	2018	2026	77	1,604	84	27.65	9	0	971	9	1/9	84.66	0	35	0	
2	Dipendra Singh Airee	2018	2026	86	1,878	105	25.37	11	2	2,989	66	4/24	31.18	0	43	0	
3	Shakti Gauchan	2018	2018	1	9	9*	–	0	0	24	0	–	–	0	1	0	
4	Karan KC	2018	2026	79	799	65*	16.64	1	0	3,472	13	5/29	25.82	4	15	0	
5	Paras Khadka‡	2018	2020	10	315	115	35.00	1	1	372	9	4/26	27.00	0	7	0	
6	Sandeep Lamichhane‡	2018	2026	83	507	49	12.36	0	0	4,532	167	6/11	19.62	3	12	0	
7	Gyanendra Malla‡	2018	2023	37	876	75	24.33	7	0	18	1	1/6	18.00	0	13	0	
8	Basanta Regmi	2018	2019	4	13	12	3.25	0	0	234	4	2/49	29.25	0	0	0	
9	Anil Sah†	2018	2025	17	403	112*	26.86	4	1	–	–	–	–	–	7	0	
10	Sompal Kami	2018	2026	75	823	67	20.07	3	0	3,305	99	5/33	29.55	1	17	0	
11	Sharad Vesawkar	2018	2021	4	66	55	22.00	1	0	36	2	2/21	10.50	0	1	0	
12	Lalit Bhandari	2018	2018	1	4	4*	–	0	0	54	2	2/43	21.50	0	0	0	
13	Subash Khakurel†	2018	2022	6	97	50	16.16	1	0	–	–	–	–	–	0	1	
14	Rohit Paudel‡	2018	2026	94	2,616	126	31.51	14	3	622	15	4/22	30.00	0	30	0	
15	Sagar Pun	2018	2018	1	3	3	3.00	0	0	–	–	–	–	–	0	0	
16	Binod Bhandari†	2019	2026	20	341	59	20.05	2	0	–	–	–	–	–	26	1	
17	Lalit Rajbanshi	2019	2026	56	46	11	3.53	0	0	2,565	69	5/20	24.60	1	12	0	
18	Pawan Sarraf	2019	2024	12	72	15	8.00	0	0	322	6	2/45	41.83	0	4	0	
19	Sundeep Jora	2019	2026	7	73	28	10.42	0	0	–	–	–	–	–	4	0	
20	Sushan Bhari	2020	2022	11	24	11	12.00	0	0	422	15	4/5	18.20	0	3	0	
21	Abinash Bohara	2020	2020	1	13	8*	–	0	0	54	0	–	–	0	0	0	
22	Kushal Malla	2020	2025	40	813	108	24.63	4	1	1,136	24	2/6	34.37	0	6	0	
23	Kamal Singh Airee	2020	2022	3	27	18*	27.00	0	0	114	2	2/56	54.50	0	0	0	
24	Aasif Sheikh†	2021	2026	80	2,209	110	29.45	15	2	–	–	–	–	–	59	11	
25	Kushal Bhurtel	2021	2026	74	1,701	120*	23.95	9	2	612	17	4/20	31.11	0	47	0	
26	Bikram Sob	2021	2022	5	4	2	1.33	0	0	127	5	2/20	23.00	0	1	0	
27	Gulsan Jha	2021	2026	56	1,089	67*	28.65	6	0	1,491	43	5/38	34.30	0	15	0	
28	Sagar Dhakal	2022	2022	8	7	4*	7.00	0	0	229	4	2/31	37.00	0	1	0	
29	Bhim Sharki	2022	2026	41	1,034	101*	29.54	4	1	6	0	–	–	0	14	0	
30	Dev Khanal	2022	2026	16	399	76	28.50	4	0	18	0	–	–	0	11	0	
31	Mohammad Aadil Alam	2022	2022	6	70	36	17.50	0	0	264	6	3/31	27.66	0	1	0	
32	Sunil Dhamala	2022	2022	1	12	12	12.00	0	0	–	–	–	–	–	0	0	
33	Basir Ahamad	2022	2026	12	187	47	18.70	0	0	184	3	1/18	49.33	0	6	0	
34	Kishore Mahato	2022	2023	2	1	1*	–	0	0	78	2	2/55	38.00	0	0	0	
35	Arjun Saud†	2022	2023	11	189	51	17.18	1	0	–	–	–	–	–	8	2	
36	Harishankar Shah	2022	2022	3	9	8	4.50	0	0	60	0	–	–	0	1	0	
37	Pratis GC	2023	2023	3	11	11*	–	0	0	126	2	1/37	45.00	0	1	0	
38	Surya Tamang	2024	2024	2	10	10*	–	0	0	90	1	1/46	78.00	0	0	0	
39	Rijan Dhakal	2024	2025	4	5	4	5.00	0	0	144	3	2/78	51.00	0	0	0	
40	Aakash Chand	2024	2024	2	–	–	–	–	–	78	2	1/31	41.00	0	1	0	
41	Hemant Dhami	2024	2026	2	15	15*	–	0	0	84	4	3/49	22.50	0	0	0	
42	Nandan Yadav	2025	2026	14	33	10*	4.12	0	0	551	18	3/12	25.77	0	1	0	
43	Arjun Kumal	2026	2026	7	252	87	36.00	1	0	–	–	–	–	–	1	0	
44	Ishan Pandey	2026	2026	13	302	84	25.16	1	0	–	–	–	–	–	6	0	
45	Sher Malla	2026	2026	1	0	0	0.00	0	0	12	0	–	–	0	0	0	

Latest ODI debut: Lokesh Bam, Rashid Khan, Mayan Yadav all made ODI debut on 22 November 2026.

== Captains ==
No.	Name	First	Last	Matches	Won	Lost	Tied	No Result	Win%
1	Paras Khadka	2019	2019	6	3	3	0	0	50.00
2	Gyanendra Malla	2020	2021	10	6	4	0	0	60.00
3	Sandeep Lamichhane	2022	2026	20	9	10	1	0	47.50
4	Rohit Paudel	2022	Present	63	31	30	0	2	50.81

- Source: Cricinfo

== See also ==
- List of Nepal Twenty20 International cricketers
- List of Nepal One Day International records
- List of Nepalese List A cricketers
