= Sudurpashchim Province cricket team =

Provincial cricket team

Sudurpashchim Province
- Nickname: SPP
- League: Prime Minister One Day Cup

Personnel
- Captain: Sher Malla
- Coach: Dipendra Bd. Chand
- Chairman: Hari Regmi
- Owner: Sudurpashchim Province Cricket Association

Team information
- City: Mahendranagar
- Colours: Green
- Established: 2020
- Home ground: Fapla International Cricket Ground
- Capacity: 40,000

History
- No. of titles: 0
- PM Cup wins: 0
- Jay Trophy wins: 0
- Official website: cricketnepal.org.np

Sudurpashchim Province Cricket team is a Nepali professional cricket team, based in the Sudurpashchim Province, Nepal. The team competes in Prime Minister Cup and Jay Trophy. The team is currently being run under the Sudurpashchim Province Cricket Association.

== Current squad ==
Name	Nationality	Birth date	Batting Style	Bowling Styles	NPL Team	Notes
Batsmen
Khadak Bohara	Nepal	24	Right-handed	Right-arm off-break	—N/a	—N/a
Naren Bhatta	Nepal	18	Right-handed	Right-arm off-break	Biratnagar Kings	—N/a
Prakash Pandey	Nepal		Right-handed	Right-arm off-break	—N/a	—N/a
Abhishek Pal	Nepal		Right-handed			—N/a
Kiran Thagunna	Nepal	29	Right-handed	—N/a	Pokhara Avengers	—N/a
All-rounders
Narayan Joshi	Nepal	25	Right-handed	Right arm medium fast	Biratnagar Kings	—N/a
Milan Bohara	Nepal	21	Right-handed	Slow left-arm orthodox	Sudurpaschim Royals	—N/a
Lokendra Chand	Nepal		Right-handed	Right-arm medium-fast		—N/a
Sher Malla	Nepal	23	Left-handed	Right-arm off-break	Lumbini Lions	Captain
Wicket-keepers
Dipak Bohara	Nepal	21	Right-handed	—N/a	Sudurpaschim Royals	—N/a
Raju Rijal	Nepal	30	Right-handed	—N/a	—N/a	—N/a
Bowlers
Bikash Aagri	Nepal		Right-handed	Right-arm medium-fast	Janakpur Bolts	—N/a
Hemant Dhami	Nepal	20	Right-handed	Right-arm medium-fast	Sudurpaschim Royals	—N/a
Saurya Shrestha	Nepal	20	Right-handed	Slow left-arm orthodox	—N/a	—N/a
Ashok Dhami	Nepal	19	Right-handed	Slow left-arm orthodox	—N/a	—N/a

== Stadium ==
- Fapla International Cricket Ground
- Dhangadi Cricket Ground

== Honors ==
- Men's Under-19 National Cricket Tournament : 2022–23, 2024
