= Nepal APF Club cricket team =

Armed Police sporting club of nepal

- Nickname: APF

Personnel
- Captain: Rohit Paudel
- Coach: Gyanendra Malla
- Owner: APF Club

Team information
- Colours: Grey
- Founded: 2010; 16 years ago
- Home ground: APF Stadium
- Capacity: 5,000

History
- No. of titles: 2
- PM Cup wins: 2 (2018,2022)
- Jay Trophy wins: 0
- Official website: www.apf.gov.np

The Nepal APF Club cricket team also known as APF Club is one of the three departmental teams of Nepal.The team competes in Prime Minister Cup and Jay Trophy.The team is currently being run under the APF Club.

== History ==
The APF Club was formed in September 2010. APF initially signed national team captain Paras Khadka and 15 other players while former national team player Raju Basnyat was appointed as the coach. APF is two times champion in one-day format of the league as in 2011 and 2012. In 2012 tournament the APF Cricket Team defended its title defeating Region-4 Bhairawa by six wicket in Final match held on 21 December 2012. In 2012, APF won the Twenty20 format of the league for the first time.

== Statistics and honours ==
- Prime Minister Cup
  - Winners (2): 2018, 2022

== Current Squads ==
As of 8 March 2025

APF Cricket Team Squad for 2025 Men's Prime Minister Cup
Name	Nationality	Age	Batting style	Bowling style	NPL Team	Notes
Batter
Lokesh Bam	Nepal	26	Right-handed	—N/a	Biratnagar Kings	—N/a
Sumit Maharjan	Nepal	26	Right-handed	—N/a	Lumbini Lions	—N/a
Sundeep Jora	Nepal	25	Right-handed	—N/a	Lumbini Lions	—N/a
Puran BK	Nepal	27	Left-handed	—N/a	—N/a	—N/a
All-rounders
Rohit Paudel	Nepal	24	Right-handed	Right-arm Off spin	Lumbini Lions	Captain
Deepak Bohara	Nepal	21	Right-handed	Right-armLeg-break	Chitwan Rhinos	—N/a
Amar Singh Routela	Nepal	33	Right-handed	Right-arm medium	Chitwan Rhinos	—N/a
Wicket-keeper
Aasif Sheikh	Nepal	25	Right-handed	—N/a	Janakpur Bolts	—N/a
Spin Bowler
Bhuvan Karki	Nepal	32	Left-handed	Left-arm orthodox spin	—N/a	—N/a
Irshad Ahamad	Nepal	30	Right-handed	Right-arm off break	—N/a	—N/a
Mousom Dhakal	Nepal	25	Right-handed	Right-armLeg-break	—N/a	—N/a
Abhishesh Gautam	Nepal	20	Right-handed	Left-arm orthodox spin	Lumbini Lions	—N/a
Yuvraj Khatri	Nepal	19	Right-handed	Leg Spin	Karnali Yaks	—N/a
Pace Bowler
Kishore Mahato	Nepal	26	Right-handed	Right-arm medium	Janakpur Bolts	—N/a
Kamal Singh Airee	Nepal	25	Right-handed	Right-arm medium	Chitwan Rhinos	—N/a
Avinash Bohara	Nepal	29	Right-handed	Right-arm medium	Sudurpaschim Royals	—N/a
Nandan Yadav	Nepal	26	Right-handed	Right-arm medium fast	Karnali Yaks	—N/a
