= Sundeep Jora =

Nepalese cricketer

Personal information
- Born: 20 October 2001 (age 25); Mahendranagar, Kanchanpur
- Batting: Right-handed
- Role: Batsman

International information
- National side: Nepal (2019–present)
- ODI debut (cap 19): 28 January 2019 v UAE
- Last ODI: 21 February 2023 v Scotland
- ODI shirt no.: 21
- T20I debut (cap 24): 31 January 2019 v UAE
- Last T20I: 16 June 2024 v Bangladesh
- T20I shirt no.: 21

Domestic team information
- Years: Team
- 2024–present: Lumbini Lions

Career statistics
Competition	ODI	T20I
Matches	5	6
Runs scored	56	101
Batting average	11.20	20.20
100s/50s	0/0	0/1
Top score	28	53*
Catches/stumpings	0/–	3/–
Medal record
Representing Nepal
Men's Cricket
South Asian Games
Bronze medal – third place	2019 Kathmandu/Pokhara	Team
- Source: ESPNcricinfo, 31 October 2023

Sundeep Jora (Nepali: सुन्दिप जोरा; born 20 October 2001) is a Nepalese cricketer, who plays as a right-handed batsman for Nepal national cricket team. He made his international cricket debut on 28 January 2019 against the UAE in the third ODI match of the series. He is the youngest player to score a Twenty20 International (T20I) half century.

== International career ==
Jora made his T20I debut against the United Arab Emirates on 31 January 2019. He scored 53 not out to become the youngest male cricketer to score a half century in a T20I match, at the age of 17 years and 103 days. He was part of Nepal's squad for the Asia qualification tournament for the 2020 Under-19 Cricket World Cup. He also featured in The 2019–20 Oman Pentangular Series.

In November 2019, he was named in Nepal's squad for the 2019 ACC Emerging Teams Asia Cup in Bangladesh. Later the same month, he was also named in Nepal's squad for the cricket tournament at the 2019 South Asian Games. The Nepal team won the bronze medal, after they beat the Maldives by five wickets in the third-place playoff match.

In May 2024, he was named in Nepal's squad for the 2024 ICC Men's T20 World Cup tournament.

In January 2026, Jora was named in Nepal's squad for 2026 T20I World Cup.
