= Nepal Police Club cricket team =

Police sporting club of Nepal

- Nickname: The Cops

Personnel
- Captain: Aarif Sheikh
- Coach: Manjeet Shrestha
- Owner: Nepal Police Club

Team information
- Colours: Sapphire
- Founded: 2010; 16 years ago
- Home ground: Nepal Police Academy, Maharjgunj, Kathmandu
- Capacity: 1000+

History
- No. of titles: 6
- PM Cup wins: 4 (2017, 2019, 2024, 2025)
- Jay Trophy wins: 2 (2024–25, 2025–26)
- Official website: www.nepalpolice.gov.np

The Nepal Police Club cricket team is also known as Nepal Police Club is one of the three departmental team of Nepal. The team competes in Prime Minister Cup and Jay Trophy.The team is currently being run under the Nepal Police Club.

== History ==
They participated in 2011 National One Day tournament but finished as a runners-up after losing to APF Club in the final. But they defeated departmental rival APF Club to lift the title of 2011 Pepsi Standard Chartered T20 National Cricket Tournament. They have also won 2017, 2019 and 2024 Prime Minister Cup.

== Statistics and honours ==
- Prime Minister Cup Men's National Cricket Tournament
  - Winners (4): 2017, (Note: The trophy was shared after the final ended in a no result.) 2019, 2024, 2025
- Kathmandu Mayor Cup Tournament
  - Winners (1): 2021
- Nepal Pro Club Championship
  - Winners (1): 2023

== Current Squad ==
As of 19 Feb 2026

Nepal Police Club Cricket Team Squad for 2025 Men's Prime Minister Cup
Name	Nationality	Age	Batting style	Bowling style	NPL Team	Notes
Batsmen
Kushal Bhurtel	Nepal	29	Right-handed	Right-arm Leg break	Pokhara Avengers	—N/a
Aarif Sheikh	Nepal	29	Right-handed	Right-arm medium	Sudurpaschim Royals	Captain
Shankar Rana	Nepal	29	Right-handed	—N/a	Biratnagar Kings	—N/a
Ameet Shrestha	Nepal	33	Right-handed	—N/a	—N/a	—N/a
Wicket-keepers
Dilip Nath	Nepal	28	Left-handed	—N/a	Lumbini Lions	—N/a
Arjun Saud	Nepal	23	Right-handed	—N/a	Chitwan Rhinos	—N/a
All-rounders
Gulshan Jha	Nepal	20	Right-handed	Right-arm medium	Karnali Yaks	—N/a
Shrawan Yadav	Nepal		Right-handed	Right-arm medium	—N/a	—N/a
Roshan Budal	Nepal	36	Right-handed	Right-arm medium	—N/a	—N/a
Sunil Daulyal	Nepal	26	Right-handed	Right-arm medium	—N/a	—N/a
Spin Bowlers
Lalit Rajbanshi	Nepal	27	Right-handed	Left-arm orthodox spin	Janakpur Bolts	—N/a
Sagar Dhakal	Nepal	24	Right-handed	Left-arm orthodox spin	Pokhara Avengers	—N/a
Pace Bowlers
Karan KC	Nepal	35	Right-handed	Right-arm medium	Kathmandu Gorkhas	—N/a
Rashid Khan	Nepal	25	Right-handed	Right-arm fast medium	Kathmandu Gorkhas	—N/a

Source: Nepalnews
