= Lalit Rajbanshi =

Nepalese cricketer

Lalit Narayan Rajbanshi
Personal information
- Full name: Lalit Narayan Rajbanshi
- Born: 27 February 1999 (age 27); Biratnagar, Nepal
- Batting: Right-handed
- Bowling: Slow left-arm orthodox
- Role: Bowler

International information
- National side: Nepal (2018-present)
- ODI debut (cap 17): 25 January 2019 v UAE
- Last ODI: 12 February 2024 v Canada
- T20I debut (cap 21): 29 July 2018 v Netherlands
- Last T20I: 27 October 2023 v UAE

Domestic team information
- Years: Team
- 2017-present: Nepal Police club
- 2024–present: Janakpur Bolts
- 2026–present: JB Bruges

Career statistics
Competition	ODI	T20I	LA
Matches	25	14	35
Runs scored	37	3	48
Batting average	6.16	3.00	4.00
100s/50s	0/0	0/0	0/0
Top score	11	3	11
Balls bowled	1032	272	1463
Wickets	31	12	40
Bowling average	20.74	23.50	24.75
5 wickets in innings	1	0	1
10 wickets in match	0	0	0
Best bowling	5/20	3/6	5/20
Catches/stumpings	7/–	4/–	11/–
Medal record
Representing Nepal
Men's Cricket
South Asian Games
Bronze medal – third place	2019 Kathmandu/Pokhara	Team
- Source: Cricinfo, 12 February 2024

Lalit Narayan Rajbanshi (Nepali: ललित नारायण राजवंशी, born 27 February 1999) is a Nepalese cricketer. He made his List A debut for Nepal against Zimbabwe in the 2018 Cricket World Cup Qualifier on 4 March 2018.

== International career ==
In July 2018, he was named in Nepal's squad for their One Day International (ODI) series against the Netherlands, but did not make it to the playing eleven. These were Nepal's first ODI matches since gaining ODI status during the 2018 Cricket World Cup Qualifier.

He made his Twenty20 International (T20I) debut on 29 July 2018 in the 2018 MCC Tri-Nation Series, against the Netherlands.

He made his One Day International (ODI) debut against the United Arab Emirates on 25 January 2019.

In June 2019, he was named in Nepal's squad for the Regional Finals of the 2018–19 ICC T20 World Cup Asia Qualifier tournament. He made his first-class debut on 6 November 2019, for Nepal against the Marylebone Cricket Club (MCC), during the MCC's tour of Nepal. Later the same month, he was named in Nepal's squads for the 2019 ACC Emerging Teams Asia Cup in Bangladesh, and for the men's cricket tournament at the 2019 South Asian Games. The Nepal team won the bronze medal, beating the Maldives by five wickets in the third-place playoff match.

In May 2024, he was named in Nepal's squad for the 2024 ICC Men's T20 World Cup tournament.

In January 2026, Rajbanshi was named in Nepal's squad for 2026 T20I World Cup.

== Records ==
He also became joint highest wickets taker with scott kuggeleijn, where they picked up 17 wickets in the first edition of 2024 Nepal Premier League
