= Koshi Province cricket team =

Nepali provincial cricket team

Koshi Province Cricket Association
- Nickname: KPCA

Personnel
- Captain: Sujan Thapaliya
- Chairman: Sarwajeet Raj Pandey
- Owner: Koshi Province Cricket Association

Team information
- City: Biratnagar
- Colours: Light Blue
- Established: 2020
- Home ground: MBJ Cricket Ground
- Capacity: 15,000
- Secondary home ground: Girija Prasad Koirala Cricket Stadium
- Secondary ground capacity: 45,000

History
- No. of titles: 0
- PM Cup wins: 0
- Jay Trophy wins: 0
- Official website: cricketnepal.org.np

Koshi Province Cricket team is a Nepali professional cricket team, based in the Koshi Province, Nepal. The team competes in Prime Minister Cup and Jay Trophy. The team is currently being run under the Koshi Province Cricket Association.

== Current squad ==
As of 8 March 2025

Koshi Province Cricket Team Squad for 2025 Men's Prime Minister Cup
Name	Nationality	Birth date	Batting style	Bowling style	NPL	Notes
Batsmen
Sujan Thapaliya	Nepal	32	Left-handed	—N/a	—N/a	—N/a
Aish Bhattarai	Nepal	21	Right-handed	—N/a	—N/a	—N/a
Samir Karki	Nepal	24	Right-handed	—N/a	—N/a	—N/a
Suman Gahatraj	Nepal	25	Right-handed	—N/a	—N/a	—N/a
All-rounders
Ankit Subedi	Nepal	22	Right-handed	Right arm Off Spinner	—N/a	Captain
Sonu Ansari	Nepal	19	Right-handed	Right arm Offbreak	—N/a	—N/a
Prakash Jung Karki	Nepal	25	Right-handed	Right arm Medium	—N/a	—N/a
Wicket-keepers
Shakib Haque	Nepal	24	Left-handed	—N/a	—N/a	—N/a
Chirag Shah	Nepal	23	Right-handed	—N/a	—N/a	—N/a
Spin Bowlers
Dipesh Kandel	Nepal	20	Left-handed	Slow left-arm orthodox	Kathmandu Gorkhas	—N/a
Bhupal Leuitel	Nepal	22	Left-handed	Slow left-arm orthodox	—N/a	—N/a
Pace Bowlers
Firdosh Ansari	Nepal	26	Right-handed	Right arm Medium	—N/a	V. Captain
Sandip Dhungana	Nepal	27	Right-handed	Right arm Medium	—N/a	—N/a
Shrawan Kisku	Nepal	17	Right-handed	Right arm Medium	Biratnagar Kings	—N/a
Bipin Mahato	Nepal	20	Right-handed	Right arm Medium	—N/a	—N/a

== Coaching staff ==
As of 1 September 2024
Position	Name
Head Coach	N/A
Assistant Coach	N/A
Team Manager	N/A
Technical Analyst	N/A
Manager	N/A
Under-19s Coach	N/A
Physio	N/A

== Stadium ==
- Girija Prasad Koirala Cricket Stadium
- Mechi Campus Cricket Ground
