= Binod Bhandari =

Nepalese cricketer (born 1990)

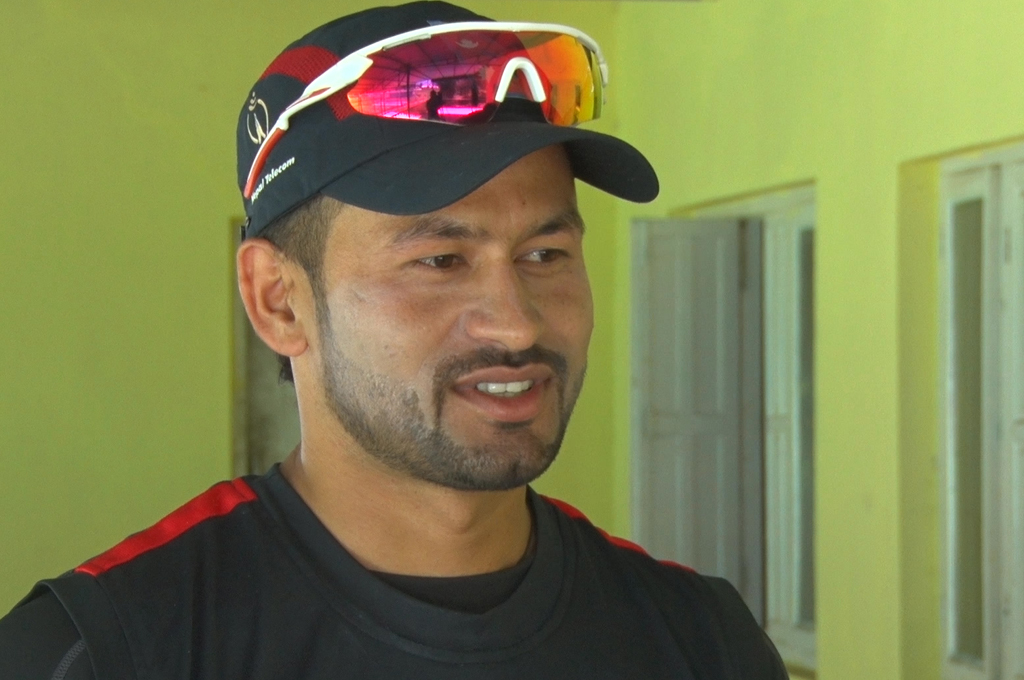

Personal information
- Born: 25 January 1990 (age 36); Kanchanpur, Nepal
- Batting: Right-handed
- Role: wicket-keeper batsman

International information
- National side: Nepal
- ODI debut (cap 16): 25 January 2019 v UAE
- Last ODI: 17 July 2022 v Scotland
- T20I debut (cap 1): 16 March 2014 v Hong Kong
- Last T20I: 24 April 2021 v Netherlands

Domestic team information
- Years: Team
- 2013–present: Tribhuwan Army Club
- 2014–2014: Sagarmatha Legends
- 2015–2015: Pentagon
- 2015–2015: Kalutura Physical Culture Club
- 2017-2021: Pokhara Rhinos
- 2024–: Sudurpashchim Royals
- 2025-present: Bhokraha Narsing Arnas

Career statistics
Competition	ODI	T20I	LA	T20
Matches	12	35	36	48
Runs scored	225	319	649	478
Batting average	22.50	15.95	20.93	15.93
100s/50s	0/1	0/2	0/2	0/3
Top score	59	58*	73	58*
Catches/stumpings	14/1	12/8	32/6	14/8
Medal record
Representing Nepal
Men's Cricket
South Asian Games
Bronze medal – third place	2019 Kathmandu/Pokhara	Team
- Source: ESPNCricinfo, 17 July 2022

Binod Bhandari (Nepali: विनोद भण्डारी; born 25 January 1990) is a Nepalese professional cricketer. He is a right-handed batsman and an occasional wicket-keeper. He made his debut against Kuwait in November 2009.

He is the captain of Tribhuvan Army Club in the National League and marquee player of Pokhara Rhinos in the Everest Premier League. Bhandari is currently serving as a captain of Nepal A cricket team. He is also the captain of Tribhuwan Army Club cricket team of Prime Minister Cup Men's National Cricket Tournament in Nepal. He is the all-time highest run scorer for Tribhuvan Army Club cricket team in PM Cup Nepal.

== Career ==
Bhandari showed glimpses of his attacking batting in the very first match of his international career. He hit a last-ball six to help Nepal win his debut match against Kuwait in 2009 ACC Twenty20 Cup. Nepal needed 7 runs to win the match off the final ball and Bhandari, who was playing his first match, was on strike, he heaved the ball for a six and the match was tied, eventually Nepal won the match in a bowl-out and Bhandari became a crowd favorite.

After the blitz against Kuwait, Binod's adventure in the national fold remained a silent one before he confirmed his permanent arrival with his two sixes against the UAE in the 2013 ACC Twenty20 Cup semi-final handed Nepal a maiden final spot. His power-packed performance in the final of the National Twenty20 saw Nepal Army Club end APF Club hegemony in the domestic cricket.

"If there is a better shot played anywhere than the “Dilscoop” the Nepal batsman hit for six in the final stage of the run-chase against Papua New Guinea on Tuesday, it deserves to get at least a million hits on YouTube. He set aside personal safety to ramp a delivery by Willie Gavera, the PNG quick bowler, just over his own forehead, on its way for a six 30 yards over the boundary behind the wicket-keeper. A large swathe of those lucky few who were there at Sharjah Cricket Stadium to see it were happy to confess it was probably the best shot they had ever seen." described Paul Radley in TheNational.ae after Nepal's win over PNG in Nepal's successful 2013 ICC World Twenty20 Qualifier. "[Bhandari’s six] was one of the best shots I’ve seen," said Tim Anderson, the ICC's global development manager. "It was a brave shot and there was terrific cricket played here today." Binod Bhandari scored 51* off 23 deliveries with 1 four and 6 sixes.

He scored 53 runs in two innings he batted during the 2014 Asian Games at an average of 53. He scored an unbeaten 43 off just 31 balls and won the man of the match award in the match against Bermuda during the 2014 ICC World Cricket League Division Three held in Malaysia.

In the 2015 ICC World Cricket League Division Two, he scored 144 runs in 6 innings at an average of 28.80, including a half-century against Kenya. In February 2015, he went Sri Lanka after being recruited by Kalutura Physical Culture Club to play in the Emerging Trophy Tournament, three-day cricket tournament.

He was in Nepal's squad for the 2018 Asia Cup Qualifier tournament. In October 2018, he was named in Nepal's squad in the Eastern sub-region group for the 2018–19 ICC World Twenty20 Asia Qualifier tournament.

He made his One Day International (ODI) debut for Nepal against the United Arab Emirates on 25 January 2019.

In June 2019, he was named in Nepal's squad for the Regional Finals of the 2018–19 ICC T20 World Cup Asia Qualifier tournament.

In September 2019, he was named in Nepal's squad for the 2019-20 Singapore Tri-Nation Series and 2019-20 Oman Pentangular Series. In the match against Hong Kong in the Pentangular Series, he scored a brisk 58 not out to lead his team to victory. This innings included 4 fours and 3 sixes.

He made his first-class debut on 6 November 2019, for Nepal against the Marylebone Cricket Club (MCC), during the MCC's tour of Nepal. Later the same month, he was named in Nepal's squad for the 2019 ACC Emerging Teams Asia Cup in Bangladesh. He was also named in Nepal's squad for the cricket tournament at the 2019 South Asian Games. The Nepal team won the bronze medal, after they beat the Maldives by five wickets in the third-place playoff match. In September 2020, he was one of eighteen cricketers to be awarded with a central contract by the Cricket Association of Nepal.
