= List of United Arab Emirates Twenty20 International cricket records =

This is a list of United Arab Emirates Twenty20 International cricket records, that is record team and individual performances in Twenty20 International cricket. It is based on the List of Twenty20 International records.

United Arab Emirates played its first Twenty20 game against Netherlands at the 2014 ICC World Twenty20 on 17 March 2014, and these records date from that game.

== Listing criteria ==
In general the top five are listed in each category (except when there is a tie for the last place among the five, when all the tied record holders are noted). Currently active players are listed in bold.

== United Arab Emirates team records ==
=== Overall results ===
==== Matches played (total) ====
Team	First T20I	Matches	Won	Lost	Tied	NR	% Won
United Arab Emirates	17 March 2014	140	77	62	0	1	55.39
Last updated: 9 November 2025

==== Matches played (by country) ====
Opponent	Matches	Won	Lost	Tied	NR	% Won
Afghanistan	6	1	5	0	0	16.66
Australia	1	0	1	0	0	0.00
Bangladesh	1	0	1	0	0	0.00
Canada	1	1	0	0	0	100.00
Hong Kong	2	2	0	0	0	100.00
India	1	0	1	0	0	0.00
Ireland	5	2	3	0	0	40.00
Jersey	1	0	1	0	0	0.00
Netherlands	8	4	4	0	0	50.00
Nepal	3	1	2	0	0	33.33
Nigeria	1	1	0	0	0	100.00
Oman	3	2	1	0	0	66.67
Pakistan	1	0	1	0	0	0.00
Papua New Guinea	3	3	0	0	0	100.00
Scotland	3	1	2	0	0	33.33
Sri Lanka	1	0	1	0	0	0.00
United States	2	1	0	0	1	100.00
Zimbabwe	1	0	1	0	0	0.00
Last updated: 9 November 2019

=== Team scoring records ===
==== Highest innings totals ====
Rank	Score	Opponent	Venue	Date
1	182/7 (20 overs)	United States	Dubai	16 March 2019
2	181/5 (20 overs)	Netherlands	Amstelveen	3 August 2019
3	180/3 (20 overs)	Papua New Guinea	Abu Dhabi	14 April 2017
4	179/4 (20 overs)	Afghanistan	Dubai	16 December 2016
5	176/4 (20 overs)	Afghanistan	Fatullah	19 February 2016
Last updated: 9 November 2019

==== Highest match aggregate ====
Rank	Score	Teams	Venue	Date
1	362/9 (39.4 overs)	United Arab Emirates (179/4) v Afghanistan (183/5)	Dubai	16 December 2016
2	349/9 (40 overs)	United Arab Emirates (181/5) v Netherlands (168/4)	Amstelveen	3 August 2019
3	340/13 (40 overs)	United Arab Emirates (182/7) v United States (158/6)	Dubai	16 March 2019
4	336/14 (39.5 overs)	United Arab Emirates (176/4) v Afghanistan (160)	Fatullah	19 February 2016
5	334/13 (40 overs)	Afghanistan (189/5) v United Arab Emirates (145/8)	Dubai	18 December 2016
Note: Teams are shown in batting order. Last updated: 9 November 2019

==== Largest successful run chases ====
Rank	Score	Opponent	Venue	Date
1	153/3 (19.4 overs)	Netherlands	The Hague	8 August 2019
2	147/4 (18.3 overs)	Hong Kong	Fatullah	21 February 2016
3	140/5 (19.3 overs)	Netherlands	Amstelveen	5 August 2019
4	134/3 (18.2 overs)	Oman	Abu Dhabi	22 November 2015
5	129/5 (19.1 overs)	Papua New Guinea	Abu Dhabi	14 April 2017
Last updated: 9 November 2019

==== Lowest innings totals ====
Rank	Score	Opponent	Venue	Date
1	73 (16.3 overs)	Netherlands	Dubai	3 February 2016
2	81/9 (20 overs)	India	Dhaka	3 March 2016
3	82 (17.4 overs)	Bangladesh	Dhaka	26 February 2016
4	100 (19.2 overs)	Ireland	Abu Dhabi	14 February 2016
5	107 (19.2 overs)	Nepal	Dubai	1 February 2019
Note: This list does not include innings scores where United Arab Emirates batted second and successfully reached a victory target in under 20 overs. Last updated: 9 November 2019

==== Lowest match aggregate ====
Rank	Score	Teams	Venue	Date
2	163/10 (30.1 overs)	United Arab Emirates (81/9) v India (82/1)	Dhaka	3 March 2016
3	194/16 (20 overs)	Nepal (104/8) v United Arab Emirates (90/8)	Dubai	3 February 2019
4	210/15 (33.3 overs)	Papua New Guinea (102) v United Arab Emirates (108/5)	Abu Dhabi	12 April 2017
5	215/18 (37.4 overs)	Bangladesh (133/8) v United Arab Emirates (82)	Dhaka	26 February 2016
1	161/11 (38.5 overs)	United Arab Emirates (90/9) v Netherlands (81/2)	Dubai	29 October 2019
Note: Teams are shown in batting order. Last updated: 9 November 2019

==== Largest margin of victory (by runs) ====
Rank	Margin	Teams	Venue	Date
1	71 runs	United Arab Emirates (172/6) beat Oman (101/8)	Dhaka	22 February 2016
2	30 runs	United Arab Emirates (180/3) beat Papua New Guinea (150)	Abu Dhabi	14 April 2017
3	24 runs	United Arab Emirates (182/7) beat United States (158/6)	Dubai	16 March 2019
4	21 runs	United Arab Emirates (153/6) beat Nepal (132/7)	Dubai	31 January 2019
5	16 runs	United Arab Emirates (176/4) beat Afghanistan (160)	Fatullah	19 February 2016
Last updated: 9 November 2019

==== Largest margin of victory (by wickets) ====
Rank	Margin	Teams	Venue	Date
1	8 wickets	United Arab Emirates (118/2) beat Hong Kong (116/7)	Abu Dhabi	21 October 2019
2	7 wickets	United Arab Emirates (134/3) beat Oman (133/8)	Abu Dhabi	22 November 2015
2	7 wickets	United Arab Emirates (153/3) beat Netherlands (150/6)	The Hague	8 August 2019
4	6 wickets	United Arab Emirates (147/4) beat Hong Kong (146/7)	Fatullah	21 February 2016
5	5 wickets	United Arab Emirates (108/5) beat Papua New Guinea (102)	Abu Dhabi	12 April 2017
5	5 wickets	United Arab Emirates (129/5) beat Papua New Guinea (128/5)	Abu Dhabi	14 April 2017
5	5 wickets	United Arab Emirates (140/5) beat Netherlands (136/9)	Amstelveen	5 August 2019
5	5 wickets	United Arab Emirates (129/5) beat Ireland (125)	Abu Dhabi	19 October 2019
5	5 wickets	United Arab Emirates (112/5) beat Nigeria (111/3)	Abu Dhabi	24 October 2019
Last updated: 9 November 2019

==== Largest margin of victory (by balls remaining) ====
Rank	Margin	Balls	Teams	Venue	Date
1	5 wickets	45	United Arab Emirates (112/5) beat Nigeria (111/3)	Abu Dhabi	24 October 2019
2	5 wickets	29	United Arab Emirates (108/5) beat Papua New Guinea (102)	Abu Dhabi	12 April 2017
2	8 Wickets	29	United Arab Emirates (118/2) beat Hong Kong (116/7)	Abu Dhabi	21 October 2019
4	5 wickets	18	United Arab Emirates (129/5) beat Ireland (125)	Abu Dhabi	19 October 2019
5	7 wickets	10	United Arab Emirates (134/3) beat Oman (133/8)	Abu Dhabi	22 November 2015
Last updated: 9 November 2019

==== Smallest margin of victory (by runs) ====
Rank	Margin	Teams	Venue	Date
1	5 runs	United Arab Emirates (133/7) beat Ireland (128/9)	Abu Dhabi	16 February 2016
2	9 runs	United Arab Emirates (148/8) beat Scotland (139/9)	Dubai	4 February 2016
3	13 runs	United Arab Emirates (181/5) beat Netherlands (168/4)	Amstelveen	3 August 2019
4	14 runs	United Arab Emirates (152/8) beat Netherlands (138/9)	The Hague	6 August 2019
4	14 runs	United Arab Emirates (154/5) beat Canada (140/5)	Abu Dhabi	27 October 2019
Last updated: 9 November 2019

==== Smallest margin of victory (by wickets) ====
Rank	Margin	Teams	Venue	Date
1	5 wickets	United Arab Emirates (108/5) beat Papua New Guinea (102)	Abu Dhabi	12 April 2017
1	5 wickets	United Arab Emirates (129/5) beat Papua New Guinea (128/5)	Abu Dhabi	14 April 2017
1	5 wickets	United Arab Emirates (140/5) beat Netherlands (136/9)	Amstelveen	5 August 2019
1	5 wickets	United Arab Emirates (129/5) beat Ireland (125)	Abu Dhabi	19 October 2019
1	5 wickets	United Arab Emirates (112/5) beat Nigeria (111/3)	Abu Dhabi	24 October 2019
Last updated: 9 November 2019

==== Smallest margin of victory (by balls remaining) ====
Rank	Margin	Balls	Teams	Venue	Date
1	7 wickets	2	United Arab Emirates (153/3) beat Netherlands (150/6)	The Hague	8 August 2019
2	5 wickets	3	United Arab Emirates (140/5) beat Netherlands (136/9)	Amstelveen	5 August 2019
3	5 wickets	5	United Arab Emirates (129/5) beat Papua New Guinea (128/5)	Abu Dhabi	14 April 2017
4	6 wickets	9	United Arab Emirates (147/4) beat Hong Kong (146/7)	Fatullah	21 February 2016
5	7 wickets	10	United Arab Emirates (134/3) beat Oman (133/8)	Abu Dhabi	22 November 2015
Last updated: 9 November 2019

== Individual records ==
=== Individual records (batting) ===
==== Highest individual score ====
Rank	Runs	Player	Opposition	Venue	Date
1	117*	Shaiman Anwar	Papua New Guinea	Abu Dhabi	14 April 2017
2	89*	**Muhammad Usman**	Canada	Abu Dhabi	27 October 2019
3	77	**Rohan Mustafa**	Afghanistan	Fatullah	19 February 2016
4	76	**Amjad Javed**	Scotland	Dubai	4 February 2019
5	75	**Ashfaq Ahmed**	Netherlands	The Hague	8 August 2019
Last updated:9 November 2019

==== Most career runs ====
Rank	Runs	Player	Innings	Not outs	Average
1	971	Shaiman Anwar	32	3	33.48
2	695	**Muhammad Usman**	32	5	25.74
3	605	**Rohan Mustafa**	37	1	16.80
4	449	**Rameez Shahzad**	21	3	24.94
5	281	Mohammad Shahzad	20	2	15.61
Last updated: 9 November 2019

==== Highest career average ====
Rank	Player	Average	Runs	Innings	Not outs
1	Shaiman Anwar	33.48	971	32	3
2	**Muhammad Usman**	25.74	695	32	5
3	**Rameez Shahzad**	24.94	449	21	3
4	**Rohan Mustafa**	16.80	605	37	1
5	Mohammad Shahzad	15.61	281	20	2
Qualification: 20 innings. Last updated: 9 November 2019

==== Highest career strike rate ====
Rank	Player	Strike rate	Balls faced	Runs
1	Shaiman Anwar	126.10	971	
2	**Muhammad Usman**	117.20	593	695
3	**Rohan Mustafa**	116.12	521	605
4	**Rameez Shahzad**	111.13	404	449
Qualification: 250 balls. Last updated: 9 November 2019

==== Most career sixes ====
Rank	Player	Sixes
1	Shaiman Anwar	43
2	**Muhammad Usman**	21
3	**Rohan Mustafa**	17
4	Amjad Javed	15
5	**Rameez Shahzad**	13
Last updated: 9 November 2019

==== Most career fours ====
Rank	Player	Fours
1	Shaiman Anwar	75
2	**Rohan Mustafa**	71
3	**Muhammad Usman**	61
4	**Rameez Shahzad**	37
5	**Ashfaq Ahmed**	32
Last updated: 9 November 2019

=== Individual records (bowling) ===
==== Best figures in a match ====
Rank	Bowling	Player	Opponent	Venue	Date
1	4/18	**Rohan Mustafa**	Ireland	Abu Dhabi	19 October 2019
2	3/9	**Rohan Mustafa**	Oman	Abu Dhabi	22 November 2015
3	3/12	Amjad Javed	Papua New Guinea	Abu Dhabi	12 April 2017
4	3/14	Mohammad Naveed	Hong Kong	Fatullah	21 February 2016
5	3/18	Mohammad Naveed	Papua New Guinea	Abu Dhabi	14 April 2017
Last updated: 9 November 2019

==== Most career wickets ====
Rank	Wickets	Player	Matches	BBI
1	39	**Rohan Mustafa**	38	4/18
2	37	Mohammad Naveed	31	3/14
3	33	Amjad Javed	22	3/12
4	20	**Zahoor Khan**	18	2/17
4	20	**Ahmed Raza**	36	2/18
Last updated: 9 November 2019

==== Best career economy rate ====
Rank	Economy rate	Player	Overs	Runs
1	6.35	Mohammad Naveed	114.4	729
2	6.47	**Ahmed Raza**	120.2	779
3	6.63	**Sultan Ahmed**	55	365
4	6.79	**Rohan Mustafa**	113.5	774
5	7.42	**Zahoor Khan**	59.3	442
Qualification: 250 balls. Last updated: 9 November 2019

==== Best career strike rate ====
Rank	Strike rate	Player	Wickets	Balls
1	13.5	Amjad Javed	33	446
2	17.5	**Rohan Mustafa**	39	683
3	17.8	**Zahoor Khan**	20	357
4	18.5	Mohammad Naveed	37	688
5	22.0	**Sultan Ahmed**	15	330
Qualification: 250 balls. Last updated: 9 November 2019

==== Best career average ====
Rank	Average	Player	Wickets	Runs
1	16.96	Amjad Javed	33	560
2	19.70	Mohammad Naveed	37	729
3	19.84	**Rohan Mustafa**	39	774
4	22.10	**Zahoor Khan**	20	442
5	24.33	**Sultan Ahmed**	15	365
Qualification: 250 balls. Last updated: 9 November 2019

=== Individual records (wicketkeeping ) ===
==== Most dismissals in career ====
Rank	Dismissals	Player	Innings	Catches	Stumpings
1	15	Ghulam Shabber	17	14	1
2	13	Swapnil Patil	18	9	4
3	3	**Mohammad Boota**	7	2	1
4	1	Abdul Shakoor	2	0	1
Last updated: 9 November 2019

=== Individual records (fielding) ===
==== Most catches (non-wicketkeeper) ====
Rank	Catches	Player	Matches
1	13	**Ahmed Raza**	36
2	11	Shaiman Anwar	32
2	11	**Rohan Mustafa**	38
4	9	**Sultan Ahmed**	17
5	8	**Rameez Shahzad**	22
Last updated: 9 November 2019

=== Individual records (other) ===
==== Most matches played in career ====
Rank	Matches	Player	Period
1	38	**Rohan Mustafa**	2014–Present
2	36	**Ahmed Raza**	2014–Present
3	34	**Muhammad Usman**	2016–Present
4	32	Shaiman Anwar	2014–2019
5	31	Mohammad Naveed	2015–2019
Last updated: 9 November 2019

== Partnership records ==
=== Record wicket partnerships ===
Partnership	Runs	Players	Opponent	Venue	Date
1st wicket	83	**Rohan Mustafa** & Muhammad Kaleem	Afghanistan	Fatullah	19 February 2016
2nd wicket	111	**Ashfaq Ahmed** & **Ghulam Shabber**	Netherlands	The Hague	8 August 2019
3rd wicket	79	Mohammad Shahzad & **Muhammad Usman**	Hong Kong	Fatullah	21 February 2016
4th wicket	109*	Shaiman Anwar & **Rameez Shahzad**	Papua New Guinea	Abu Dhabi	14 April 2017
5th wicket	56	**Muhammad Usman** & **Darius D'Silva**	Netherlands	Amstelveen	3 August 2019
6th wicket	46	**Muhammad Usman** & **Amjad Javed**	Pakistan	Dhaka	29 February 2016
7th wicket	38	Swapnil Patil & **Amjad Javed**	Sri Lanka	Dhaka	25 February 2016
8th wicket	59*	**Amjad Javed** & Mohammad Naveed	Ireland	Dubai	18 January 2017
9th wicket	27	**Shadeep Silva** & **Kamran Shahzad**	Zimbabwe	Sylhet	21 March 2014
9th wicket	27	**Amjad Javed** & Mohammad Naveed	Scotland	Edinburgh	9 July 2015
10th wicket	16*	**Ahmed Raza** & **Qadeer Ahmed**	Sri Lanka	Dhaka	25 February 2016
Last updated: 9 November 2019

*Note: An asterisk (*) signifies an unbroken partnership (i.e. neither of the batsmen were dismissed before either the end of the allotted overs or they reached the required score).

=== Highest partnerships ===
Rank	Runs	Wicket	Players	Opponent	Venue	Date
1	111	2nd Wicket	**Ashfaq Ahmed** & **Ghulam Shabber**	Netherlands	The Hague	8 August 2019
2	109*	4th Wicket	Shaiman Anwar & **Rameez Shahzad**	Papua New Guinea	Abu Dhabi	14 April 2017
3	100	4th Wicket	**Muhammad Usman** & **Rameez Shahzad**	Papua New Guinea	Abu Dhabi	14 April 2017
4	86	2nd Wicket	Muhammad Kaleem & Mohammad Shahzad	Oman	Dhaka	22 February 2016
4	86	2nd Wicket	**Rohan Mustafa** & Shaiman Anwar	Afghanistan	Dubai	18 December 2016
Last updated: 9 November 2019

*Note: An asterisk (*) signifies an unbroken partnership (i.e. neither of the batsmen were dismissed before either the end of the allotted overs or they reached the required score).

== See also ==
List of Twenty20 International records
