= Emirati cricket team in Zimbabwe in 2018–19 =

International cricket tour

	Zimbabwe	United Arab Emirates
- Dates: 8 – 16 April 2019
Captains	Peter Moor	Mohammad Naveed

One Day International series
- Results: Zimbabwe won the 4-match series 4–0
Most runs	Sean Williams (151)	Shaiman Anwar (112)
Most wickets	Kyle Jarvis (10)	Rohan Mustafa (6)
- Player of the series: Regis Chakabva (Zim)

The United Arab Emirates cricket team toured Zimbabwe in April 2019 to play four One Day International (ODI) matches. It was the first time that the United Arab Emirates played a Full Member side in a bilateral series.

Ahead of the tour, Zimbabwe named a 27-man training squad. Zimbabwe's regular captain, Hamilton Masakadza, was ruled out of the tour due to injury, with Peter Moor named as the ODI captain in his place. Also missing for Zimbabwe was experienced batsman Brendan Taylor, who was ruled out due to a calf muscle tear. Zimbabwe Cricket announced that the profits from the third ODI match of the tour would go to the Cyclone Idai relief efforts. Zimbabwe's former captain, Graeme Cremer, worked as a coaching consultant for the UAE team for the tour, after Cremer moved from Zimbabwe to Dubai earlier in the year.

Zimbabwe won the series 4–0.

== Squads ==
ODIs
Zimbabwe	United Arab Emirates
Peter Moor (c); Ryan Burl; Regis Chakabva; Brian Chari; Tendai Chatara; Elton Chigumbura; Craig Ervine; Kyle Jarvis; Timycen Maruma; Brandon Mavuta; Solomon Mire; Christopher Mpofu; Tony Munyonga; Ainsley Ndlovu; Sikandar Raza; Donald Tiripano; Sean Williams	Mohammad Naveed (c); Ashfaq Ahmed; Qadeer Ahmed; Sultan Ahmed; Shaiman Anwar; Mohammad Boota; Imran Haider; Amir Hayat; Zahoor Khan; Rohan Mustafa; Chundangapoyil Rizwan; Ghulam Shabber; Chirag Suri; Muhammad Usman

Ryan Burl was added to Zimbabwe's squad for the third and fourth ODIs.

== Tour match ==
=== 50-over match: Zimbabwe Chairman's XI vs United Arab Emirates ===
8 April 2019
09:30
Scorecard

Zimbabwe Chairman's XI; 228/9 (50 overs)	v	United Arab Emirates; 232/5 (46.1 overs)
Dion Myers 52 (72); Qadeer Ahmed 3/32 (10 overs)		Ashfaq Ahmed 131* (144); Richard Ngarava 2/27 (8 overs)

United Arab Emirates won by 5 wickets
Old Hararians Sports Club, Harare
Umpires: Iknow Chabi (Zim) and Christopher Phiri (Zim)

- Zimbabwe Chairman's XI won the toss and elected to bat.

== Fixtures ==
=== 1st ODI ===
10 April 2019
09:30
Scorecard

United Arab Emirates; 110 (44.5 overs)	v	Zimbabwe; 111/3 (23.1 overs)
Mohammad Boota 36 (76); Tendai Chatara 3/25 (10 overs)		Craig Ervine 51 (46); Qadeer Ahmed 1/16 (5 overs)

Zimbabwe won by 7 wickets
Harare Sports Club, Harare
Umpires: Shaun George (SA) and Langton Rusere (Zim)
Player of the match: Tendai Chatara (Zim)

- Zimbabwe won the toss and elected to field.
- Sultan Ahmed (UAE) made his ODI debut.
- Peter Moor captained Zimbabwe for the first time in ODIs.

=== 2nd ODI ===
12 April 2019
09:30
Scorecard

United Arab Emirates; 169/9 (35 overs)	v	Zimbabwe; 185/4 (32 overs)
Shaiman Anwar 72 (73); Kyle Jarvis 4/17 (7 overs)		Regis Chakabva 78* (101); Rohan Mustafa 2/38 (7 overs)

Zimbabwe won by 4 runs (DLS method)
Harare Sports Club, Harare
Umpires: Iknow Chabi (Zim) and Shaun George (SA)
Player of the match: Peter Moor (Zim)

- Zimbabwe won the toss and elected to field.
- Zimbabwe were set a revised target of 181 runs from 32 overs due to rain and bad light.

=== 3rd ODI ===
14 April 2019
09:30
Scorecard

Zimbabwe; 307/4 (50 overs)	v	United Arab Emirates; 176 (46.2 overs)
Sean Williams 109* (84); Mohammad Naveed 1/42 (9 overs)		Muhammad Usman 49 (74); Ryan Burl 4/32 (6.2 overs)

Zimbabwe won by 131 runs
Harare Sports Club, Harare
Umpires: Shaun George (SA) and Langton Rusere (Zim)
Player of the match: Sean Williams (Zim)

- United Arab Emirates won the toss and elected to field.
- Sean Williams scored the fastest century for a Zimbabwe batsman in ODIs (75 balls).

=== 4th ODI ===
16 April 2019
09:30
Scorecard

United Arab Emirates; 175 (47.1 overs)	v	Zimbabwe; 129/7 (24.5 overs)
Chirag Suri 46 (76); Sean Williams 2/27 (10 overs)		Timycen Maruma 35 (22); Mohammad Naveed 2/26 (6 overs)

Zimbabwe won by 3 wickets (DLS method)
Harare Sports Club, Harare
Umpires: Shaun George (SA) and Langton Rusere (Zim)
Player of the match: Kyle Jarvis (Zim)

- United Arab Emirates won the toss and elected to bat.
- Zimbabwe were set a revised target of 128 runs from 30 overs due to rain.
