= Papua New Guinean cricket team in the United Arab Emirates in 2016–17 =

International cricket tour

Papua New Guinean cricket team in the UAE in 2016–17
	United Arab Emirates	Papua New Guinea
- Dates: 31 March – 14 April 2017
Captains	Rohan Mustafa	Assad Vala

One Day International series
- Results: United Arab Emirates won the 3-match series 2–1
Most runs	Rohan Mustafa (185)	Vani Morea (120)
Most wickets	Imran Haider (8)	Assad Vala (6)

Twenty20 International series
- Results: United Arab Emirates won the 3-match series 3–0
Most runs	Shaiman Anwar (157)	Sese Bau (69)
Most wickets	Mohammad Naveed (7)	Norman Vanua (6)

The Papua New Guinea national cricket team toured the United Arab Emirates in March and April 2017 to play three One Day Internationals (ODIs), three Twenty20 Internationals (T20Is) and a first-class match. Two of the three ODI matches were part of the 2015–17 ICC World Cricket League Championship and the first-class match was part of the 2015–17 ICC Intercontinental Cup tournament. Before the international fixtures, Papua New Guinea played warm-up matches against the English sides Middlesex County Cricket Club and Yorkshire County Cricket Club.

The United Arab Emirates won the ODI series 2–1, after winnings the final match of the series by 103 runs. The UAE won the Intercontinental Cup match by a margin of 9 wickets, their first victory in a first-class match since 2013. The UAE won the T20I series 3–0.

== Squads ==
United Arab Emirates	Papua New Guinea
Rohan Mustafa (c); Sultan Ahmed; Shaiman Anwar; Adnan Mufti; Muhammad Usman; Ghulam Shabber; Mohammed Qasim; Amjad Javed; Mohammad Naveed; Ahmed Raza; Imran Haider; Zahoor Khan; Qadeer Ahmed; Rameez Shahzad; Laxman Sreekumar	Assad Vala (c); Dogodo Bau; Sese Bau; Mahuru Dai; Willie Gavera; Alei Nao; Nosaina Pokana; John Reva; Lega Siaka; Chad Soper; Tony Ura; Jack Vare; Vani Vagi Morea; Norman Vanua

== ODI series ==
=== 3rd ODI ===
4 April 2017
Scorecard

United Arab Emirates; 251/9 (50 overs)	v	Papua New Guinea; 148 (35.2 overs)
Rohan Mustafa 109 (125); Assad Vala 3/30 (10 overs)		Tony Ura 40 (49); Rohan Mustafa 5/25 (8.2 overs)

United Arab Emirates won by 103 runs
Sheikh Zayed Cricket Stadium, Abu Dhabi
Umpires: Akbar Ali (UAE) and Shozab Raza (Pak)

- United Arab Emirates won the toss and elected to bat.
- Rohan Mustafa (UAE) scored his maiden ODI century and took his maiden ODI five-wicket haul, becoming the third player to do this in the same ODI.

== T20I series ==
=== 1st T20I ===
12 April 2017
Scorecard

Papua New Guinea; 102 (18.2 overs)	v	United Arab Emirates; 108/5 (15.1 overs)
Mahuru Dai 31 (27); Amjad Javed 3/12 (4 overs)		Shaiman Anwar 39 (25); John Reva 2/18 (3.1 overs)

United Arab Emirates won by 5 wickets
Sheikh Zayed Cricket Stadium, Abu Dhabi
Umpires: Akbar Ali (UAE) and Shozab Raza (Pak)

- United Arab Emirates won the toss and elected to field.
- Alei Nao (PNG) and Sultan Ahmed (UAE) both made their T20I debuts.

=== 2nd T20I ===
14 April 2017
Scorecard

United Arab Emirates; 180/3 (20 overs)	v	Papua New Guinea; 150 (20 overs)
Shaiman Anwar 117* (68); Norman Vanua 2/41 (3 overs)		Jack Vare 38 (36); Mohammad Naveed 3/18 (4 overs)

United Arab Emirates won by 30 runs
Sheikh Zayed Cricket Stadium, Abu Dhabi
Umpires: Akbar Ali (UAE) and Shozab Raza (Pak)

- Papua New Guinea won the toss and elected to field.
- Shaiman Anwar (UAE) scored his first century in a T20I and became the first from his country to do so.

=== 3rd T20I ===
14 April 2017 (D/N)
Scorecard

Papua New Guinea; 128/5 (20 overs)	v	United Arab Emirates; 130/5 (19.1 overs)
Lega Siaka 31 (36); Rohan Mustafa 2/27 (4 overs)		Muhammad Usman 58 (49); Norman Vanua 3/35 (4 overs)

United Arab Emirates won by 5 wickets
Sheikh Zayed Cricket Stadium, Abu Dhabi
Umpires: Akbar Ali (UAE) and Shozab Raza (Pak)

- Papua New Guinea won the toss and elected to bat.
- Dogodo Bau (PNG), Adnan Mufti and Laxman Sreekumar (UAE) all made their T20I debuts.
