= List of United Arab Emirates national cricket captains =

This is a list of all cricketers who have captained the United Arab Emirates in an official international match, including One Day International and Twenty20 International matches.

== One Day International ==
Last updated 2 July 2023.

United Arab Emirati ODI Captains
No.	Name	Year	Played	Won	Tied	Lost	N/R
1	Sultan Zarawani	1994–1996	7	1	0	6	0
2	Khurram Khan	2004–2015	8	3	0	5	0
3	Saqib Ali	2008	2	0	0	2	0
4	Ahmed Raza	2014–2022	29	14	1	14	0
5	Mohammad Tauqir	2015	6	0	0	6	0
6	Amjad Javed	2016	2	0	0	2	0
7	Rohan Mustafa	2017–2018	18	8	0	10	0
8	Mohammad Naveed	2019	7	1	0	6	0
9	Chundangapoyil Rizwan	2022–2023	8	3	0	5	0
10	Muhammad Waseem	2023-2023	19	6	0	13	0
11	Vriitya Aravind	2023-2023	1	0	0	1	0
Overall			107	36	1	70	

== Twenty20 International ==
Last updated 18 August 2022.

United Arab Emirati T20I Captains
Number	Name	Year	Played	Won	Tied	Lost	No Result
1	Khurram Khan	2014	3	0	0	3	0
2	Mohammad Tauqir	2015	3	0	0	3	0
3	Ahmed Raza	2015–2022	27	18	0	9	0
4	Amjad Javed	2016–2017	14	5	0	9	0
5	Rohan Mustafa	2016–2018	5	3	0	2	0
6	Mohammad Naveed	2019	8	5	0	2	1
7	Rameez Shahzad	2019	1	1	0	0	0
Overall			61	32	0	28	1

== ICC Trophy (non-ODI) ==
The United Arab Emirates debuted in the ICC Trophy in the 1993/94 tournament

United Arab Emirati ICC Trophy Captains
Number	Name	Year	Played	Won	Tied	Lost	No Result
1	Sultan Zarawani	1993–1994	8	8	0	0	0
2	Riaz Poonawala	1993–1994	1	1	0	0	0
3	Saeed-al-Saffar	1996/97-2001	17	10	0	7	0
4	Khurram Khan	2005-2005	7	3	0	3	1
Overall			33	22	0	10	1
