= List of United Arab Emirates Twenty20 International cricketers =

The UAE was first granted T20I status in January 2014, by virtue of being granted One Day International (ODI) status. This was a result of their performance at the 2014 World Cup Qualifier, where they placed second to qualify for the 2015 World Cup. The team had made its ODI debut as early as 1994, against India, but received ODI status on a non-temporary basis only in 2014. The UAE's first full Twenty20 Internationals came at the 2014 World Twenty20 in Bangladesh, where the team played against the Netherlands, Ireland, and Zimbabwe. The team played further T20Is at the 2015 World Twenty20 Qualifier, but failed to qualify for the 2016 World Twenty20 tournament.

This list includes names of all members of the UAE cricket team who have played at least one T20I match. It is initially arranged in the order in which each player won his first Twenty20 cap. Where more than one player won his first Twenty20 cap in the same match, their surnames are listed alphabetically.

== Key ==
General

- ‡ – Captain
- † – Wicket-keeper
- First – Year of debut
- Last – Year of latest game
- Mat – Number of matches played

Batting

- Runs – Runs scored in career
- HS – Highest score
- 50 – Half-centuries scored
- 100 – Centuries scored
- Avg – Runs scored per dismissal
- * – Batsman remained not out

Bowling

- Balls – Balls bowled in career
- Wkt – Wickets taken in career
- BBI – Best bowling in an innings
- Ave – Average runs per wicket

Fielding

- Ca – Catches taken
- St – Stumpings affected

== List of players ==
Last updated 17 September 2026.

United Arab Emirates T20I cricketers
General					Batting					Bowling				Fielding		Ref
No.	Name	First	Last	Mat	Runs	HS	50	100	Avg	Balls	Wkt	BBI	Ave	Ca	St	Ref
1	Amjad Ali	2014	2015	5	42	20	0	0	10.50	–	–	–	–	1	0	
2	Amjad Javed ‡	2014	2017	22	271	76	1	0	18.06	446	33	3/12	16.96	4	0	
3	Faizan Asif	2014	2015	6	80	28	0	0	13.33	–	–	–	–	0	0	
4	Manjula Guruge	2014	2015	5	3	1*	0	0	3.00	96	5	2/18	25.00	1	0	
5	Kamran Shazad	2014	2015	3	21	21	0	0	10.50	52	2	2/19	38.50	1	0	
6	Khurram Khan ‡	2014	2014	3	73	31	0	0	24.33	6	1	1/8	8.00	2	0	
7	Swapnil Patil †	2014	2016	18	187	37	0	0	14.38	–	–	–	–	9	4	
8	Rohan Mustafa ‡	2014	2023	58	1,006	77	4	0	20.95	1,106	61	4/18	21.03	25	0	
9	Shaiman Anwar	2014	2019	32	971	117*	6	1	33.48	–	–	–	–	11	0	
10	Vikrant Shetty	2014	2014	2	1	10	0	0	11.00	–	–	–	–	1	0	
11	Shadeep Silva	2014	2014	2	16	13*	0	0	16.00	42	2	1/20	29.00	1	0	
12	Ahmed Raza ‡	2014	2022	55	122	22	0	0	12.20	1068	37	5/19	31.83	20	0	
13	Sharif Asadullah	2014	2014	1	–	–	–	–	–	18	2	2/21	10.50	0	0	
14	Abdul Shakoor †	2015	2019	6	35	20*	0	0	17.50	–	–	–	–	0	1	
15	Mohammad Naveed ‡	2015	2019	31	176	27*	0	0	12.57	688	37	3/14	19.70	4	0	
16	Mohammad Shahzad	2015	2017	20	281	52	1	0	15.61	289	13	3/34	31.61	1	0	
17	Mohammad Tauqir ‡	2015	2015	3	4	4	0	0	4.00	42	0	–	–	1	0	
18	Umair Ali	2015	2015	3	22	13	0	0	22.00	24	1	1/13	28.00	0	0	
19	Fayyaz Ahmed	2015	2015	1	11	11	0	0	11.00	18	1	1/29	29.00	1	0	
20	Nasir Aziz	2015	2015	1	–	–	–	–	–	24	0	–	–	0	0	
21	Amjad Gul	2015	2016	4	28	24	0	0	9.33	–	–	–	–	2	0	
22	Qadeer Ahmed	2015	2019	10	7	5*	0	0	7.00	192	9	2/18	28.11	2	0	
23	Zaheer Maqsood	2015	2016	3	2	2	0	0	2.00	54	1	1/29	80.00	1	0	
24	Fahad Tariq	2016	2016	6	19	8	0	0	4.75	18	0	–	–	4	0	
25	Farhan Ahmed	2016	2016	3	4	4	0	0	4.00	54	3	2/28	22.00	1	0	
26	Muhammad Kaleem	2016	2016	9	97	50	1	0	10.77	–	–	–	–	1	0	
27	Muhammad Usman	2016	2022	47	891	89*	3	0	24.08	–	–	–	–	12	0	
28	Saqlain Haider	2016	2016	6	14	7	0	0	3.50	–	–	–	–	4	0	
29	Usman Mushtaq	2016	2016	3	13	9	0	0	13.00	–	–	–	–	0	0	
30	Ghulam Shabber †	2016	2019	17	208	58*	1	0	18.90	–	–	–	–	14	1	
31	Mohammed Qasim	2016	2017	3	36	13*	0	0	18.00	6	0	–	–	1	0	
32	Rameez Shahzad	2016	2019	22	449	54	1	0	24.94	–	–	–	–	8	0	
33	Atif Ali Khan	2016	2016	1	–	–	–	–	–	24	0	–	–	0	0	
34	Imran Haider	2016	2019	11	4	4*	0	0	–	186	7	1/16	35.71	1	0	
35	Muhammed Shanil	2016	2016	1	1	1*	0	0	–	24	0	–	–	0	0	
36	Zahoor Khan	2017	2023	57	11	6	0	0	2.75	1,239	72	4/16	19.52	8	0	
37	Sultan Ahmed	2017	2022	25	64	18	0	0	5.81	495	22	4/9	22.09	15	0	
38	Adnan Mufti	2017	2017	1	7	7*	0	0	–	–	–	–	–	0	0	
39	Laxman Sreekumar	2017	2017	1	0	0	0	0	0.00	–	–	–	–	0	0	
40	Amir Hayat	2018	2019	4	3	3	0	0	1.50	84	6	2/26	17.16	0	0	
41	Ashfaq Ahmed	2018	2019	12	238	75	3	0	19.83	36	2	1/14	17.00	2	0	
42	Chirag Suri	2018	2022	31	817	88	7	0	29.17	–	–	–	–	0	0	
43	Mohammad Boota ‡	2019	2022	19	136	20*	0	0	17.00	6	1	1/13	13.00	4	2	
44	Chundangapoyil Rizwan ‡	2019	2023	18	323	51*	1	0	24.84	–	–	–	–	4	0	
45	Darius D'Silva	2019	2019	10	130	29	0	0	3250	–	–	–	–	4	0	
46	Waheed Ahmed	2019	2020	15	141	45*	0	0	20.14	222	11	3/21	23.36	2	0	
47	Zawar Farid	2019	2023	18	163	55	1	0	12.53	186	8	2/31	31.25	7	0	
48	Junaid Siddique	2019	2026	91	96	18	0	0	7.38	2,013	126	5/35	20.33	18	0	
49	Vriitya Aravind †	2020	2024	48	1,052	97*	6	0	27.68	–	–	–	–	26	5	
50	Basil Hameed	2020	2026	65	796	51	2	0	21.51	537	38	4/25	16.84	33	0	
51	Alishan Sharafu ‡	2020	2026	74	1,927	90*	15	0	31.59	1	0	–	–	31	0	
52	Ansh Tandon	2020	2023	9	70	34*	0	0	11.66	–	–	–	–	8	0	
53	Mohammad Ayaz	2020	2020	1	0	0	0	0	0.00	12	0	–	–	0	0	
53	Kashif Daud	2021	2022	14	86	28*	0	0	14.33	227	11	4/32	25.27	2	0	
55	Muhammad Waseem ‡	2021	2026	99	3,371	112	26	3	36.24	76	5	2/13	28.20	76	0	
56	Sanchit Sharma	2021	2025	5	6	4	0	0	6.00	78	1	1/47	125.00	1	0	
57	Akif Raja	2021	2025	23	75	28	0	0	25.00	396	21	3/22	25.04	3	0	
58	Karthik Meiyappan	2021	2023	15	19	12	0	0	9.50	312	23	4/25	15.95	4	0	
59	Aryan Lakra	2022	2024	10	114	63*	1	0	14.25	42	2	1/14	23.00	5	0	
60	Sabir Ali	2022	2022	3	0	0*	0	0	–	48	3	1/16	23.33	0	0	
61	Aayan Afzal Khan	2022	2026	40	172	42	0	0	13.23	830	41	3/7	20.63	9	0	
62	Fahad Nawaz	2022	2022	1	–	–	–	–	–	–	–	–	–	0	0	
63	Muhammad Jawadullah	2023	2026	41	25	13*	0	0	12.50	919	60	4/21	19.93	7	0	
64	Ali Naseer	2023	2024	40	321	48*	0	0	16.05	817	51	4/24	20.03	22	0	
65	Asif Khan	2023	2025	56	1,302	79	6	0	28.30	6	0	–	–	7	0	
66	Mohammed Faraazuddin	2023	2023	6	24	21*	0	0	8.00	84	2	1/15	62.50	1	0	
67	Aryansh Sharma †	2023	2026	22	550	74*	5	0	27.50	–	–	–	–	11	2	
68	Nilansh Keswani	2023	2026	13	55	31*	0	0	55.00	275	11	2/16	29.90	4	0	
69	Khalid Shah	2023	2023	8	116	37	0	0	14.50	–	–	–	–	3	0	
70	Jash Giyanani	2023	2023	1	–	–	–	–	–	24	0	–	–	0	0	
71	Tanish Suri †	2023	2026	14	282	77	1	0	21.69	–	–	–	–	12	3	
72	Samal Udawaththa	2023	2023	1	4	4	0	0	4.00	–	–	–	–	0	0	
73	Dhruv Parashar	2023	2026	35	219	32	0	0	15.64	630	32	4/12	22.43	18	0	
74	Rahul Chopra †	2024	2026	41	759	80	5	0	27.10	–	–	–	–	29	2	
75	Hazrat Luqman	2024	2024	2	8	8	0	0	8.00	36	1	1/30	60.00	0	0	
76	Zuhaib Zubair	2024	2026	21	93	26*	0	0	11.62	365	22	5/21	19.90	7	0	
77	Omid Shafi Rahman	2024	2024	5	0	0	0	0	0.00	82	5	3/19	17.60	1	0	
78	Ashwanth Valthapa	2024	2024	1	5	5	0	0	5.00	–	–	–	–	0	0	
79	Muhammad Farooq	2024	2026	14	19	18	0	0	19.00	270	15	4/35	24.26	4	0	
80	Vishnu Sukumaran	2024	2024	10	151	50	1	0	18.87	12	1	1/4	29.00	3	0	
81	Syed Haider †	2024	2026	20	173	47	0	0	17.30	–	–	–	–	13	2	
82	Simranjeet Singh †	2024	2026	17	5	3*	0	0	2.50	327	19	4/15	18.00	4	0	
83	Haider Ali	2025	2026	31	60	15*	0	0	6.00	708	35	4/16	21.20	7	0	
84	Matiullah Khan	2025	2025	5	1	1*	0	0	–	96	4	2/41	37.25	2	0	
85	Muhammad Zohaib	2025	2026	16	303	50	1	0	20.20	6	0	–	–	6	0	
86	Saghir Khan	2025	2025	8	58	28*	0	0	11.60	174	14	3/44	18.14	6	0	
87	Ethan D'Souza	2025	2025	11	139	34	0	0	15.44	47	5	4/9	10.60	5	0	
88	Muhammad Rohid	2025	2026	17	4	2*	0	0	4.00	342	19	3/23	24.52	1	0	
89	Harshit Kaushik	2025	2026	17	175	44*	0	0	15.90	120	2	1/15	77.00	6	0	
90	Zahid Ali	2025	2025	6	29	18*	0	0	29.00	102	5	2/27	39.80	2	0	
91	Muhammad Arfan	2025	2026	13	123	32	0	0	17.57	262	15	2/8	19.13	1	0	
92	Jonathan Figy	2025	2025	2	19	19	0	0	9.50	–	–	–	–	0	0	
93	Mayank Kumar	2025	2026	6	60	21	0	0	12.00	–	–	–	–	2	0	
94	Yayin Kiran Rai	2025	2025	1	34	34	0	0	34.00	–	–	–	–	0	0	
95	Sohaib Khan	2025	2026	11	177	68	2	0	22.12	6	0	–	–	3	0	
96	Akshdeep Nath	2026	2026	4	96	53*	1	0	–	18	0	–	–	1	0	
97	Adeeb Usmani	2026	2026	5	215	96*	2	0	71.66	24	1	1/23	23.00	0	1	
98	Harpreet Singh	2026	2026	5	42	32	0	0	10.50	–	–	–	–	1	0	
99	Khuzaima Tanveer	2026	2026	5	70	68*	1	0	35.00	107	7	3/29	18.85	3	0	
100	Ajay Kumar	2026	2026	1	–	–	–	–	–	24	0	–	–	0	0	
101	Ibrar Ahmad	2026	2026	3	–	–	–	–	–	72	5	4/13	15.80	1	0	
102	Muhammad Mohsin	2026	2026	3	–	–	–	–	–	66	2	1/31	49.50	0	0	

== See also ==
- Twenty20 International
- United Arab Emirates cricket team
- List of United Arab Emirates ODI cricketers
- United Arab Emirati national cricket captains
