= Alawi Shukri =

Emirati cricketer (born 1990)

Personal information
- Full name: Alawi Shukri Al Braik
- Born: 23 January 1990 (age 36); Dubai, United Arab Emirates
- Batting: Left-handed
- Bowling: Right-arm off-break
- Role: Batsman

International information
- National side: United Arab Emirates
- Only ODI (cap 38): 26 June 2008 v Sri Lanka

Career statistics
Competition	ODI
Matches	1
Runs scored	1
Batting average	1.00
100s/50s	0/0
Top score	1
Balls bowled	–
Wickets	–
Bowling average	–
5 wickets in innings	–
10 wickets in match	–
Best bowling	–
Catches/stumpings	0/–
- Source: CricketArchive, 29 November 2008

Alawi Shukri Al Braik (born 23 January 1990) is an Emirati cricketer who has played one One Day International for the United Arab Emirates.
