= Indika Batuwitarachchi =

Sri Lankan/Emirati cricketer (born 1974)

Personal information
- Full name: Indika Prabath Priyankara Batuwitarachchi
- Born: 3 November 1974 (age 52); Colombo, Sri Lanka
- Batting: Right-handed
- Bowling: Right-arm
- Role: Batsman

International information
- National side: United Arab Emirates
- ODI debut (cap 33): 24 June 2008 v Bangladesh
- Last ODI: 26 June 2008 v Sri Lanka

Career statistics
Competition	ODI
Matches	2
Runs scored	14
Batting average	7.00
100s/50s	0/0
Top score	14
Balls bowled	–
Wickets	–
Bowling average	–
5 wickets in innings	–
10 wickets in match	–
Best bowling	–
Catches/stumpings	2/–
- Source: CricketArchive, 29 November 2008

Indika Prabath Priyankara Batuwitarachchi (born 3 November 1974) is a Sri Lankan-born former cricketer who played for the United Arab Emirates national cricket team. He has played two One Day Internationals for the United Arab Emirates.
