= Ansh Tandon =

Emirati cricketer (born 2001)

Personal information
- Born: 8 November 2001 (age 25); New Delhi, India
- Batting: Left-handed
- Bowling: Right-arm fast-medium
- Role: Bowler

International information
- National side: United Arab Emirates
- Only ODI (cap 101): 5 April 2023 v Jersey
- T20I debut (cap 52): 25 February 2020 v Saudi Arabia
- Last T20I: 20 August 2023 v New Zealand
- Source: ESPNcricinfo, 5 April 2023

Ansh Tandon (born 8 November 2001) is an Indian-born cricketer who plays for the United Arab Emirates national cricket team. In February 2020, he was named in the UAE's Twenty20 International (T20I) squad for the 2020 ACC Western Region T20 qualifier tournament. He made his T20I debut against Saudi Arabia, on 25 February 2020. Prior to his T20I debut, he was named in the United Arab Emirates squad for the 2020 Under-19 Cricket World Cup, and was named as one of the team's key players.

In January 2021, he was due to be selected in the UAE's squad to play against Ireland. However, before the start of the tour he tested positive for COVID-19, and was ruled out of the series. In March 2021, he was called up by the Punjab Kings to train with the team ahead of the 2021 Indian Premier League.

In March 2023, he was named in the UAE's squad for the 2023 Cricket World Cup Qualifier Play-off. He made his One Day International (ODI) debut on 5 April 2023, against Jersey.
