= Kamran Shazad =

Emirati cricketer (born 1980)

Personal information
- Born: 25 August 1980 (age 46); Gujranwala, Pakistan
- Batting: Right-handed
- Bowling: Right-arm medium-fast
- Role: Bowler

International information
- National side: United Arab Emirates
- ODI debut (cap 43): 1 February 2014 v Scotland
- Last ODI: 4 December 2014 v Afghanistan
- T20I debut (cap 5): 17 March 2014 v Netherlands
- Last T20I: 21 March 2014 v Zimbabwe
- Source: ESPNcricinfo, 5 December 2014

Kamran Shazad (Urdu: کامران شازاد; born 25 August 1980) is a Pakistani-born cricketer who played for the United Arab Emirates national cricket team. He made his Twenty20 International debut for the United Arab Emirates against the Netherlands on 17 March 2014 and his One Day International debut against Scotland on 1 February 2014.
