= Adnan Mufti =

Emirati cricketer (born 1984)

Personal information
- Born: 30 December 1984 (age 41); Kharian Cantt, Punjab, Pakistan
- Batting: Left-handed
- Bowling: Right-arm medium

International information
- National side: United Arab Emirates
- ODI debut (cap 67): 24 January 2017 v Scotland
- Last ODI: 30 August 2018 v Nepal
- Only T20I (cap 38): 14 April 2017 v PNG

Career statistics
Competition	ODI	T20I	FC	LA
Matches	18	1	49	51
Runs scored	330	6	2,284	967
Batting average	27.50	–	29.66	25.44
100s/50s	0/1	0/0	1/19	1/3
Top score	57*	6*	110	104
Balls bowled	–	–	102	–
Wickets	–	–	1	–
Bowling average	–	–	50.00	–
5 wickets in innings	–	–	0	–
10 wickets in match	–	–	0	–
Best bowling	–	–	1/19	–
Catches/stumpings	4/–	0/–	66/–	23/–
- Source: Cricinfo, 12 June 2019

Adnan Mufti (Urdu: عدنان مفتی; born 30 December 1984) is a Pakistani-born cricketer who played for the United Arab Emirates national cricket team. He played 46 first-class and 19 List A matches between 2007 and 2016 in Pakistan. In December 2016 he was named in the United Arab Emirates squad for their Twenty20 International (T20I) series against Afghanistan. He made his One Day International (ODI) debut for the United Arab Emirates against Scotland on 24 January 2017 and was awarded the man of the match. He made his T20I debut for the United Arab Emirates against Papua New Guinea on 14 April 2017.

In September 2017, he scored his maiden century in first-class cricket, when he made 110 for the United Arab Emirates against Namibia in the 2015–17 ICC Intercontinental Cup. In December 2017, he scored his first century in List A cricket, when he made 104 for the United Arab Emirates against Nepal in the 2015–17 ICC World Cricket League Championship.

In January 2018, he was named in the United Arab Emirates' squad for the 2018 ICC World Cricket League Division Two tournament. In August 2018, he was named in the United Arab Emirates' squad for the 2018 Asia Cup Qualifier tournament.
