= Alei Nao =

Papua New Guinean cricketer (born 1993)

Personal information
- Born: 9 December 1993 (age 32)
- Batting: Right-handed
- Bowling: Right-arm medium

International information
- National side: Papua New Guinea
- ODI debut (cap 18): 31 March 2017 v UAE
- Last ODI: 5 March 2023 v United Arab Emirates
- T20I debut (cap 18): 12 April 2017 v UAE
- Last T20I: 23 July 2023 v Philippines

Career statistics
Competition	ODI	T20I	LA	T20
Matches	19	3	22	3
Runs scored	100	55	91	7
Batting average	20.00	7.00	17.66	7.00
100s/50s	0/0	0/0	0/0	0/0
Top score	46	30*	46	7*
Balls bowled	907	54	1018	54
Wickets	23	2	27	2
Bowling average	32.52	44.00	31.33	44.00
5 wickets in innings	0	0	0	0
10 wickets in match	0	0	0	0
Best bowling	4/27	2/39	4/27	2/39
Catches/stumpings	8/–	0/–	8/–	0/–
Medal record
Representing Papua New Guinea
Men's Cricket
Pacific Games
Silver medal – second place	2015 Port Moresby	20 over cricket
- Source: Cricinfo, 23 July 2023

Alei Nao (born 9 December 1993) is a Papua New Guinean cricketer. He made his List A debut in the 2015–17 ICC World Cricket League Championship on 28 May 2016 against Kenya. He made his One Day International (ODI) debut on 31 March 2017 against the United Arab Emirates in the 2015–17 ICC World Cricket League Championship. He made his Twenty20 International (T20I) debut on 12 April 2017, also against the United Arab Emirates.

He was part of Papua New Guinea's squad for Group A of the 2018–19 ICC World Twenty20 East Asia-Pacific Qualifier tournament.

In May 2024, he was named in Papua New Guinea's squad for the 2024 ICC Men's T20 World Cup tournament.
