= Nizel Fernandes =

Emirati cricketer (born 1977)

Personal information
- Full name: Nizel Fernandes
- Born: 3 January 1977 (age 49); Bombay, India
- Batting: Left-handed
- Bowling: Slow left-arm orthodox
- Role: Batsman

International information
- National side: United Arab Emirates
- Only ODI (cap 40): 26 June 2008 v Sri Lanka

Career statistics
Competition	ODI
Matches	1
Runs scored	5
Batting average	5.00
100s/50s	0/0
Top score	5
Balls bowled	–
Wickets	–
Bowling average	–
5 wickets in innings	–
10 wickets in match	–
Best bowling	–
Catches/stumpings	0/–
- Source: CricketArchive, 29 November 2008

Nizel Fernandes (born 3 January 1977) is an Indian-born former cricketer who has played for the United Arab Emirates national cricket team. He has played one One Day International for the United Arab Emirates with a top score of 5 in his only one day international.
