= Muhammad Farooq (Emirati cricketer) =

Emirati cricketer

Personal information
- Full name: Muhammad Momand Farooq
- Born: 5 October 1992 (age 34); Mohmand District, Khyber Pakhtunkhwa, Pakistan
- Batting: Right-handed
- Bowling: Right-arm leg spin
- Role: Bowler

International information
- National side: United Arab Emirates
- ODI debut (cap 112): 26 September 2024 v Namibia
- Last ODI: 1 November 2024 v Oman
- T20I debut (cap 79): 12 April 2024 v Kuwait
- Last T20I: 13 February 2026 v Canada
- Source: Cricinfo, 18 February 2026

Muhammad Momand Farooq (born 5 October 1992) is a Pakistani-born cricketer who plays for the United Arab Emirates national cricket team. He is a right-arm leg spin bowler.

== Personal life ==
Farooq was born in Mohmand District, Khyber Pakhtunkhwa, Pakistan. He was raised in Mohmand District in Khyber Pakhtunkhwa. He moved to the UAE in 2017 where he worked as a data entry assistant, as a facilities supervisor for GEMS Education in Dubai, and for a real estate company.

== Domestic career ==
In Pakistan, Farooq played cricket for Mohmand at under-19 and Grade II level as well as representing Peshawar University and the Higher Education Commission cricket team. He initially played as a wicket-keeper and began bowling leg spin later in his career.

Farooq represented Team Abu Dhabi in the Abu Dhabi T10.

== International career ==
Farooq made his Twenty20 International debut for the UAE against Kuwait in the 2024 ACC Men's Premier Cup. His One Day International debut came against Namibia in the Cricket World Cup League 2 in September 2024.

Farooq was selected in the UAE squad for the 2026 Men's T20 World Cup and made his World Cup debut in the second match against Canada.
