= Abdul Shakoor (Emirati cricketer) =

Emirati cricketer (born 1988)

Personal information
- Full name: Sher Muhammad Abdul Shakoor
- Born: 21 March 1988 (age 38); Sharjah, United Arab Emirates
- Batting: Right-handed
- Role: Wicketkeeper and opening batsman

International information
- National side: United Arab Emirates
- ODI debut (cap 57): 16 November 2015 v Hong Kong
- Last ODI: 30 August 2018 v Nepal
- T20I debut (cap 14): 9 July 2015 v Scotland
- Last T20I: 16 March 2019 v USA

Career statistics
Competition	ODI	T20I	LA
Matches	3	6	9
Runs scored	54	35	132
Batting average	18.00	17.50	14.66
100s/50s	0/0	0/0	0/0
Top score	24	20*	30
Catches/stumpings	4/1	0/1	5/3
- Source: ESPNcricinfo, 12 June 2019

Abdul Shakoor (born 21 March 1988) is a cricketer who played for the United Arab Emirates national cricket team. A wicket-keeper who opens the batting, he made his Twenty20 International debut against Scotland in the 2015 ICC World Twenty20 Qualifier tournament on 9 July 2015. He made his One Day International debut against Hong Kong in the 2015–17 ICC World Cricket League Championship on 16 November 2015.

In August 2018, he was named in the UAE squad for the 2018 Asia Cup Qualifier tournament.

He played for the Maratha Arabians in the opening game of the 2021 T10 League in Abu Dhabi, winning the power hitter and player of the match awards. He opened the batting and top scored with 73 runs off 28 balls, his first fifty runs coming from only 14 balls.

Abdul Shakoor was born and raised in Sharjah. His father moved to the UAE from Pakistan to work for the Sharjah Electricity and Water Authority.
