= Laxman Sreekumar =

Emirati cricketer (born 1987)

Personal information
- Full name: Laxman Sreekumar
- Born: 15 May 1987 (age 39); Nattakom, Kerala, India
- Batting: Right-handed
- Role: Middle-order batsman

International information
- National side: United Arab Emirates
- ODI debut (cap 60): 16 November 2015 v Hong Kong
- Last ODI: 16 August 2016 v Scotland
- T20I debut (cap 39): 14 April 2017 v Papua New Guinea
- Source: ESPNcricinfo, 18 January 2018

Laxman Sreekumar (born 15 May 1987) is an Indian-born cricketer who played for the United Arab Emirates national cricket team. He made his first-class debut for the UAE against Hong Kong in the 2015–17 ICC Intercontinental Cup tournament on 11 November 2015. His One Day International debut was also against Hong Kong in the 2015–17 ICC World Cricket League Championship on 16 November 2015. He made his Twenty20 International (T20I) debut against Papua New Guinea on 14 April 2017.
