= 2018 Asia Cup Qualifier =

Cricket tournament

- Dates: 29 August – 6 September 2018
- Administrator: Asian Cricket Council
- Cricket format: One Day International and Limited overs (50–over)
- Tournament format(s): Round-robin and final
- Host: Malaysia
- Champions: Hong Kong (1st title)
- Participants: 6
- Matches: 16
- Player of the series: (United Arab Emirates) Ahmed Raza
- Most runs: (United Arab Emirates) Ashfaq Ahmed (224)
- Most wickets: (United Arab Emirates) Ahmed Raza (16)

The 2018 Asia Cup Qualifier was a cricket tournament that was held in Malaysia from 29 August to 6 September 2018. The event served as the qualifier for the 2018 Asia Cup. The top two teams from the group stage met in the final, with the winner progressing to the 2018 Asia Cup. The fixture between the United Arab Emirates and Nepal on 30 August 2018 was a One Day International (ODI) match. It was the first time both sides had played each other in an ODI match, with the UAE going on to win the fixture by 78 runs.

The UAE finished top of the group stage with eight points. They were joined in the final by Hong Kong, who finished second with seven points, and a better net run rate than Oman, who also finished with seven points. Hong Kong won the final, beating the UAE by two wickets, to qualify for the 2018 Asia Cup. Hong Kong's captain, Anshuman Rath, said afterwards that "all the hard work that has gone in this tournament over the last couple of months really has paid off".

== Squads ==
The following teams and squads were selected to take part:

Hong Kong	Malaysia	Nepal	Oman	Singapore	United Arab Emirates
Anshuman Rath (c); Tanwir Afzal; Nadeem Ahmed; Haroon Arshad; Christopher Carter; Babar Hayat; Aftab Hussain; Aizaz Khan; Ehsan Khan; Nizakat Khan; Waqas Khan; Cameron McAuslan; Scott McKechnie; Ehsan Nawaz; Kinchit Shah; ~~Jhathavedh Subramanyan~~	Ahmad Faiz (c); Muhamad Syahadat (vc); Rashid Ahad; Anwar Arudin; Syed Aziz; Suharril Fetri; Ainool Haqqiem; Syazrul Idrus; Saifullah Malik; Dhivendran Mogan; Sharvin Muniandy; Anwar Rahman; Shafiq Sharif; Pavandeep Singh; Virandeep Singh	Paras Khadka (c); Gyanendra Malla (vc); Dipendra Singh Airee; Binod Bhandari; Lalit Bhandari; Sompal Kami; Karan KC; Subash Khakurel; Sandeep Lamichhane; Rohit Paudel; Sagar Pun; Lalit Rajbanshi; Basanta Regmi; Anil Sah; Aarif Sheikh	Zeeshan Maqsood (c); Khawar Ali (vc); Fayyaz Butt; Aqib Ilyas; Kaleemullah; Bilal Khan; Mehran Khan; Naseem Khushi; Suraj Kumar; Ajay Lalcheta; Sufyan Mehmood; Mohammad Nadeem; Jay Odedra; Jatinder Singh; Vaibhav Wategaonkar	Chetan Suryawanshi (c); Aritra Dutta; Aalap Asurlekar; Rezza Gaznavi; Anantha Krishna; Amjad Mahboob; Arjun Mutreja; Anish Paraam; Rohan Rangarajan; Abhiraj Singh; Manpreet Singh; Kartikeyan Subramanian; Aryaman Sunil; Sharan Swaminathan; Selladore Vijayakumar	Rohan Mustafa (c); Ashfaq Ahmed; Shaiman Anwar; Rahul Bhatia; Imran Haider; Amir Hayat; Zahoor Khan; Adnan Mufti; Mohammad Naveed; Fahad Nawaz; Ahmed Raza; Rameez Shahzad; Abdul Shakhoor; Chirag Suri; Muhammad Usman

Prior to the tournament, Anshuman Rath replaced Babar Hayat as captain of Hong Kong. Jhathavedh Subramanyan was ruled out of Hong Kong's squad with injury, and was replaced by Aftab Hussain.

== Points table ==
Pos	Team	Pld	W	L	T	NR	Pts	NRR	
1	United Arab Emirates	5	4	1	0	0	8	1.289	Advanced to the final
2	Hong Kong (Q)	5	3	1	0	1	7	1.530	Advanced to the final
3	Oman	5	3	1	0	1	7	0.583	
4	Nepal	5	2	3	0	0	4	−0.250	
5	Malaysia	5	1	4	0	0	2	−0.995	
6	Singapore	5	1	4	0	0	2	−2.175	

Source: ESPNCricinfo
(Q) Advance to 2018 Asia Cup

== Fixtures ==
=== Round 1 ===
29 August 2018
09:30
Scorecard

Hong Kong; 161 (46.4 overs)	v	Malaysia; 162/7 (42.5 overs)
Babar Hayat 58 (58); Pavandeep Singh 3/13 (10 overs)		Shafiq Sharif 49 (63); Nadeem Ahmed 4/25 (10 overs)

Malaysia won by 3 wickets
Kinrara Academy Oval, Bandar Kinrara
Umpires: Anil Chaudhary (Ind) and Masudur Rahman (Ban)
Player of the match: Pavandeep Singh (Mas)

- Malaysia won the toss and elected to field.

29 August 2018
09:30
Scorecard

Nepal; 221/9 (50 overs)	v	Oman; 224/3 (48 overs)
Sagar Pun 83 (84); Ajay Lalcheta 2/34 (10 overs)		Khawar Ali 84* (96); Paras Khadka 1/24 (7 overs)

Oman won by 7 wickets
Bayuemas Oval, Pandamaran
Umpires: Viswanadan Kalidas (Mas) and Sarika Prasad (Sin)
Player of the match: Khawar Ali (Oma)

- Oman won the toss and elected to field.

29 August 2018
09:30
Scorecard

United Arab Emirates; 312/8 (49 overs)	v	Singapore; 97 (25.4 overs)
Chirag Suri 111 (124); Amjad Mahboob 3/61 (10 overs)		Chetan Suryawanshi 51* (64); Ahmed Raza 6/20 (8.4 overs)

United Arab Emirates won by 215 runs
UKM Cricket Oval, Bangi
Umpires: Lyndon Hannibal (SL) and Ahsan Raza (Pak)
Player of the match: Chirag Suri (UAE)

- Singapore won the toss and elected to field.
- The match was reduced to 49 overs per side due to rain.

=== Round 2 ===
30 August 2018
09:30
Scorecard

United Arab Emirates; 254/9 (50 overs)	v	Nepal; 176 (48.5 overs)
Chirag Suri 65 (91); Sandeep Lamichhane 4/24 (10 overs)		Subash Khakurel 50 (97); Ahmed Raza 4/37 (10 overs)

United Arab Emirates won by 78 runs
Kinrara Academy Oval, Bandar Kinrara
Umpires: Lyndon Hannibal (SL) and Masudur Rahman (Ban)
Player of the match: Ahmed Raza (UAE)

- Nepal won the toss and elected to field.
- Sagar Pun (Nep) made his ODI debut.

30 August 2018
09:30
Scorecard

Singapore; 150 (41.2 overs)	v	Hong Kong; 154/5 (34.2 overs)
Abhiraj Singh 42 (71); Nadeem Ahmed 4/30 (8.2 overs)		Kinchit Shah 47* (72); Selladore Vijayakumar 3/27 (10 overs)

Hong Kong won by 5 wickets
Bayuemas Oval, Pandamaran
Umpires: Anil Chaudhary (Ind) and Narayanan Sivan (Mas)
Player of the match: Nadeem Ahmed (HK)

- Hong Kong won the toss and elected to field.

30 August 2018
09:30
Scorecard

Malaysia; 198/8 (50 overs)	v	Oman; 199/8 (49.2 overs)
Virandeep Singh 74* (110); Bilal Khan 3/28 (10 overs)		Ajay Lalcheta 44* (58); Rashid Ahad 4/30 (10 overs)

Oman won by 2 wickets
UKM Cricket Oval, Bangi
Umpires: Buddhi Pradhan (Nep) and Ahsan Raza (Pak)
Player of the match: Ajay Lalcheta (Oma)

- Oman won the toss and elected to field.

=== Round 3 ===
1 September 2018
09:30
Scorecard

Singapore; 215/8 (50 overs)	v	Oman; 216/2 (26.4 overs)
Anish Paraam 77 (93); Bilal Khan 4/40 (10 overs)		Aqib Ilyas 108 (71); Manpreet Singh 1/23 (4 overs)

Oman won by 8 wickets
Kinrara Academy Oval, Bandar Kinrara
Umpires: Batumalai Ramani (Mas) and Ahsan Raza (Pak)
Player of the match: Aqib Ilyas (Oma)

- Singapore won the toss and elected to bat.

1 September 2018
09:30
Scorecard

Nepal; 188/7 (30 overs)	v	Malaysia; 169/9 (30 overs)
Aarif Sheikh 64* (48); Syazrul Idrus 3/27 (6 overs)		Syed Aziz 34 (25); Basanta Regmi 3/36 (6 overs)

Nepal won by 19 runs
Bayuemas Oval, Pandamaran
Umpires: Lyndon Hannibal (SL) and Sarika Prasad (Sin)
Player of the match: Dipendra Singh Airee (Nep)

- Malaysia won the toss and elected to field.
- The match was reduced to 30 overs per side due to rain.

1 September 2018
09:30
Scorecard

Hong Kong; 275/8 (49 overs)	v	United Arab Emirates; 93 (24.5 overs)
Babar Hayat 107 (105); Rohan Mustafa 3/55 (10 overs)		Rohan Mustafa 33 (42); Ehsan Khan 4/17 (6 overs)

Hong Kong won by 182 runs
UKM Cricket Oval, Bangi
Umpires: Viswanadan Kalidas (Mas) and Narayanan Sivan (Mas)
Player of the match: Babar Hayat (HK)

- United Arab Emirates won the toss and elected to field.
- The match was reduced to 49 overs per side due to rain.

=== Round 4 ===
2 September 2018
09:30
Scorecard

Oman; 183 (50 overs)	v	Hong Kong; 25/0 (5 overs)
Mohammad Nadeem 54 (93); Ehsan Nawaz 4/39 (10 overs)		Christopher Carter 14* (21)

No result
Kinrara Academy Oval, Bandar Kinrara
Umpires: Masudur Rahman (Ban) and Narayanan Sivan (Mas)

- Hong Kong won the toss and elected to field.
- Rain stopped play during Hong Kong's innings.

2 September 2018
09:30
Scorecard

Malaysia; 92 (31.1 overs)	v	United Arab Emirates; 93/2 (8.1 overs)
Sharvin Muniandy 16 (21); Ahmed Raza 4/28 (10 overs)		Rohan Mustafa 38* (26); Syed Aziz 2/35 (3 overs)

United Arab Emirates won by 8 wickets
Bayuemas Oval, Pandamaran
Umpires: Buddhi Pradhan (Nep) and Sarika Prasad (Sin)
Player of the match: Rohan Mustafa (UAE)

- Malaysia won the toss and elected to bat.

2 September 2018
09:30
Scorecard

Singapore; 151 (42 overs)	v	Nepal; 152/6 (28.1 overs)
Chetan Suryawanshi 60 (88); Lalit Rajbanshi 3/27 (9 overs)		Anil Sah 43 (32); Selladore Vijayakumar 2/33 (8 overs)

Nepal won by 4 wickets
UKM Cricket Oval, Bangi
Umpires: Anil Chaudhary (Ind) and Batumalai Ramani (Mas)
Player of the match: Lalit Rajbanshi (Nep)

- Singapore won the toss and elected to bat.

=== Round 5 ===
4 September 2018
09:30
Scorecard

Singapore; 276/9 (50 overs)	v	Malaysia; 247 (49.5 overs)
Anish Paraam 100 (95); Syazrul Idrus 3/51 (7 overs)		Shafiq Sharif 93 (101); Amjad Mahboob 5/49 (10 overs)

Singapore won by 29 runs
Kinrara Academy Oval, Bandar Kinrara
Umpires: Anil Chaudhary (Ind) and Buddhi Pradhan (Nep)
Player of the match: Anish Paraam (Sin)

- Singapore won the toss and elected to bat.

4 September 2018
09:30
Scorecard

United Arab Emirates; 208/8 (50 overs)	v	Oman; 195 (47.2 overs)
Rohan Mustafa 71 (104); Zeeshan Maqsood 2/21 (5 overs)		Aqib Ilyas 43 (43); Rohan Mustafa 2/31 (10 overs)

United Arab Emirates won by 13 runs
Bayuemas Oval, Pandamaran
Umpires: Lyndon Hannibal (SL) and Viswanadan Kalidas (Mas)
Player of the match: Rohan Mustafa (UAE)

- Oman won the toss and elected to field.

4 September 2018
09:30
Scorecard

Nepal; 95 (37.5 overs)	v	Hong Kong; 96/7 (32.3 overs)
Aarif Sheikh 18 (53); Ehsan Khan 4/15 (7.5 overs)		Anshuman Rath 52 (81); Sandeep Lamichhane 5/27 (10 overs)

Hong Kong won by 3 wickets
UKM Cricket Oval, Bangi
Umpires: Batumalai Ramani (Mas) and Ahsan Raza (Pak)
Player of the match: Anshuman Rath (HK)

- Nepal won the toss and elected to bat.

== Final ==
6 September 2018
09:30
Scorecard

United Arab Emirates; 176/9 (24 overs)	v	Hong Kong; 179/8 (23.3 overs)
Ashfaq Ahmed 79 (51); Aizaz Khan 5/28 (5 overs)		Nizakat Khan 38 (20); Mohammad Naveed 2/47 (5 overs)

Hong Kong won by 2 wickets (DLS method)
Kinrara Academy Oval, Bandar Kinrara
Umpires: Anil Chaudhary (Ind) and Ahsan Raza (Pak)
Player of the match: Aizaz Khan (HK)

- Hong Kong won the toss and elected to field.
- Hong Kong were set a revised target of 179 runs from 24 overs due to rain.
