= Tanish Suri =

Emirati cricketer (born 2005)

Personal information
- Born: 4 June 2005 (age 21); Dubai, United Arab Emirates
- Batting: Right-handed
- Role: Wicket-keeper

International information
- National side: United Arab Emirates (2023–present)
- ODI debut (cap 109): 28 February 2024 v Canada
- Last ODI: 5 March 2024 v Canada
- T20I debut (cap 71): 29 December 2023 v Afghanistan
- Last T20I: 2 January 2024 v Afghanistan
- Source: Cricinfo, 28 February 2024

Tanish Suri (born 5 June 2005) is an Emirati cricketer who plays for the United Arab Emirates cricket team. He primarily plays as a wicket-keeper and right-handed batsman.

== Career ==
On 11 December 2023, he played a match-winning inning of 75 runs off 88 balls in the ACC Under-19 Cup against Sri Lanka. In December 2023, he was rewarded for his performance and selected in UAE's T20I squad for the series against Afghanistan. He made his Twenty20 International debut against Afghanistan on 29 December 2023 at Sharjah Cricket Stadium. He scored 20 runs off 25 balls. In the second T20, he scored 11 runs off 5 balls before being run out. In January 2024, he was drafted into Desert Vipers squad in the Emirati International League T20.
