= Aryansh Sharma =

Emirati cricketer

Personal information
- Born: 3 December 2004 (age 21); Ghaziabad, Uttar Pradesh, India
- Batting: Right-handed
- Role: Wicket-keeper

International information
- National side: United Arab Emirates
- ODI debut (cap 102): 5 April 2023 v Jersey
- Last ODI: 7 November 2024 v Oman
- T20I debut (cap 67): 19 August 2023 v New Zealand
- Last T20I: 10 February 2026 v New Zealand
- Source: Cricinfo, 4 June 2023

Aryansh Sharma (born 3 December 2004) is an Indian-born cricketer who plays for the United Arab Emirates national cricket team. He is a wicket-keeper.

== Personal life ==
Sharma was born on 3 December 2004 in Ghaziabad, India. He moved to the UAE with his family at the age of two. He attended Delhi Private School Sharjah, and later - the Manipal Academy of Higher Education in Dubai.

== Cricket career ==
Sharma represented the UAE at the 2022 Under-19 Cricket World Cup in the West Indies. He also represented the team at the 2023 Asia Division One Qualifier for the 2024 ICC Men's T20 World Cup.

In March 2023, Sharma was called up to the senior national squad for the 2023 Nepal Tri-Nation Series which saw the UAE qualify for the 2023 Cricket World Cup Qualifier Play-off. He made his One Day International (ODI) debut against Jersey in the final match of the World Cup Qualifier Play-off.

In January 2026, Sharma was named in UAE's squad for the 2026 T20 World Cup.
