= Dogodo Bau =

Papua New Guinean cricketer (born 1994)

Personal information
- Full name: Dogodo Bau
- Born: 5 December 1994 (age 31)
- Batting: Right-handed
- Role: Wicketkeeper

International information
- National side: Papua New Guinea
- ODI debut (cap 13): 4 November 2016 v Hong Kong
- Last ODI: 16 April 2022 v Oman

Career statistics
Competition	ODI	T20I	FC
Matches	14	1	2
Runs scored	204	–	26
Batting average	18.54	–	6.50
100s/50s	0/0	–	0/0
Top score	46	–	15
Catches/stumpings	8/3	0/0	4/1
- Source: ESPNcricinfo, 21 April 2023

Dogodo Bau (born 5 December 1994) is a cricketer from Papua New Guinea. He is a right-handed wicket-keeper batsman.

He made his first-class debut for Papua New Guinea against Namibia on 16 October 2016. He made his List A debut against Namibia on 21 October 2016.

== International career ==
Bau made his One Day International (ODI) debut on 4 November 2016 against Hong Kong and his Twenty20 International (T20I) debut on 14 April 2017 against the United Arab Emirates.
