= Abd al-Shakur =

ʻAbd al-Shakūr (ALA-LC romanization of Arabic: عبد الشکور) is a male Muslim given name, comprising two Arabic words ʻabd and al-Shakūr, the latter being one of the names of God in the Qur'an, which give rise to the Muslim theophoric names. It means "servant of the All-thankful".

Because the Arabic letter corresponding to sh is a sun letter, the letter l of the al- is assimilated to it. Thus although the name is written with letters corresponding to Abd al-Shakur, the usual pronunciation corresponds to Abd ash-Shakur. Alternative transliterations include Abdul Shakoor and others, all subject to variant spacing and hyphenation.

It may refer to:

- ʽAbd al-Shakur ibn Yusuf, Emir of Harar, Ethiopia, until 1782
- Muhammad ibn 'Ali 'Abd ash-Shakur, Emir of Harar, Ethiopia, until 1875
- 'Abd Allah II ibn 'Ali 'Abd ash-Shakur (died 1930), Emir of Harar, Ethiopia, until 1887
- Abdul Shakoor Rashad (1921–2004), Afghan writer and scholar
- Abdus Shakur (writer) (1941–2013), Bangladeshi litterateur and musicologist
- Abdus Shakoor (painter) (born 1947), Bangladeshi painter
- Abdul Shakoor (1968–2023), Pakistani politician
- Mustafadden Abdush Shakur, known as Mustafa Shakur, (born 1984), American basketball player
- Abdul Shakoor (Emirati cricketer) (born 1988), an Emirati cricketer
- Abdul Shakoor (German cricketer) (born 1999), also known as Abdul-Shakoor Rahimzei, a German cricketer
- Abdusakur Tan, Filipino governor
