= Ashfaq Ahmed (Emirati cricketer) =

Emirati cricketer (born 1985)

Personal information
- Full name: Mohammad Ashfaq Ahmed
- Born: 26 March 1985 (age 41); Lahore, Pakistan

International information
- National side: United Arab Emirates
- ODI debut (cap 72): 11 January 2018 v Ireland
- Last ODI: 16 April 2019 v Zimbabwe
- T20I debut (cap 41): 22 October 2018 v Australia
- Last T20I: 19 October 2019 v Ireland

Career statistics
Competition	ODI	T20I	FC	LA
Matches	16	6	18	49
Runs scored	344	21	567	1,265
Batting average	21.50	3.50	19.55	25.81
100s/50s	0/2	0/0	0/2	2/5
Top score	92	8	82	114
Balls bowled	223	12	290	470
Wickets	4	1	7	10
Bowling average	46.25	14.00	20.42	43.50
5 wickets in innings	0	0	0	0
10 wickets in match	0	0	0	0
Best bowling	2/55	1/14	2/19	2/5
Catches/stumpings	6/–	1/–	12/–	17/–
- Source: Cricinfo, 19 October 2019

Mohammad Ashfaq Ahmed (born 26 March 1985), commonly shortened as Ashfaq Ahmed or Mohammad Ashfaq, is a Pakistani-born cricketer who played for the United Arab Emirates national cricket team.

== In Pakistan ==
In a Twenty20 match for Lahore Eagles against Rawalpindi Rams, Ashfaq scored 99 runs not out off 58 balls. He reached 99 when Lahore still needed three runs for victory, then Rawalpindi bowler Najaf Shah deliberately bowled a wide ball down the leg side which went for four runs, handing Lahore the victory but preventing Ashfaq from scoring his maiden century. So upset were the Lahore team with this negative tactic that they refused to shake hands with the Rawalpindi players.

== In the UAE ==
Ashfaq made his List A debut for the United Arab Emirates against Nepal in the 2015–17 ICC World Cricket League Championship on 6 December 2017.

In January 2018, he was named in the UAE's One Day International (ODI) squad for the tri-series against Ireland and Scotland. He made his ODI debut against Ireland in the tri-series on 11 January 2018. Later the same month, he was named in the UAE squad for the 2018 ICC World Cricket League Division Two tournament.

In August 2018, he was named in the UAE squad for the 2018 Asia Cup Qualifier tournament.

He made his Twenty20 International (T20I) debut against Australia in a one-off match on 22 October 2018.

In December 2018, he was named in the United Arab Emirates' team for the 2018 ACC Emerging Teams Asia Cup. He was the leading run-scorer for the United Arab Emirates in the tournament, with 167 runs in three matches.

In September 2019, he was named in the United Arab Emirates' squad for the 2019 ICC T20 World Cup Qualifier tournament in the UAE. Ahead of the tournament, the International Cricket Council (ICC) named him as the player to watch in the UAE's squad. However, on 21 October 2019, he became the fourth UAE cricketer to be suspended by the ICC, following an investigation into corruption. Ahmed had played in the first two matches for the team in the tournament. In September 2020, Ahmed, along with his UAE teammate Amir Hayat, was charged under the ICC's anti-corruption rules, and was suspended from cricket with immediate effect. In July 2021, the ICC banned both Ashfaq and Hayat from all cricket for eight years, backdated to 13 September 2020.
