= Stanley Chioza =

Zimbabwean cricketer (born 1981)

Personal information
- Born: 28 May 1981 (age 45); Salisbury, Zimbabwe
- Batting: Right-handed
- Bowling: Right-arm medium-fast

Domestic team information
- Years: Team
- 2003/04: Manicaland
- 2004/05: Mashonaland
- 2005/06: Manicaland

Career statistics
Competition	FC	LA
Matches	4	2
Runs scored	159	1
Batting average	19.87	1.00
100s/50s	0/1	0/0
Top score	63	1
Balls bowled	12	12
Wickets	0	0
Bowling average	–	–
5 wickets in innings	–	–
10 wickets in match	–	–
Best bowling	–	–
Catches/stumpings	0/–	0/–
- Source: ESPNcricinfo, 17 July 2021

Stanley Chioza (born 28 May 1981) is a former Zimbabwean cricketer. A right-handed batsman and right-arm medium-fast bowler, he played four first-class matches for Manicaland during the 2003–04 Logan Cup. As of 2021, he is an assistant coach of the Southern Rocks.
