= Sultan Ahmed (Emirati cricketer) =

Emirati cricketer (born 1989)

Personal information
- Born: 11 October 1989 (age 37); Gujranwala, Pakistan
- Batting: Left-handed
- Bowling: Left-arm orthodox
- Role: Bowler

International information
- National side: United Arab Emirates
- ODI debut (cap 78): 10 April 2019 v Zimbabwe
- Last ODI: 16 April 2019 v Zimbabwe
- T20I debut (cap 37): 12 April 2017 v PNG
- Last T20I: 24 August 2022 v Hong Kong
- Source: Cricinfo, 24 August 2022

Sultan Ahmed (born 11 October 1989) is a Pakistani-born cricketer who plays for the United Arab Emirates national cricket team. He made his Twenty20 International (T20I) debut for the United Arab Emirates against Papua New Guinea on 12 April 2017. In April 2019, he was named in the UAE's One Day International (ODI) squad for their series against Zimbabwe. He made his ODI debut for the UAE against Zimbabwe on 10 April 2019.

In September 2019, he was named in the United Arab Emirates' squad for the 2019 ICC T20 World Cup Qualifier tournament in the UAE. In December 2020, he was one of ten cricketers to be awarded a year-long full-time contract by the Emirates Cricket Board.
