= Qadeer Ahmed =

Emirati cricketer (born 1985)

Personal information
- Full name: Qadeer Ahmed Khan
- Born: 15 November 1985 (age 40); Attock, Pakistan
- Batting: Right handed
- Bowling: Right handed medium-fast
- Role: Bowler

International information
- National side: United Arab Emirates
- ODI debut (cap 63): 18 November 2015 v Hong Kong
- Last ODI: 14 April 2019 v Zimbabwe
- T20I debut (cap 22): 22 November 2015 v Oman
- Last T20I: 8 August 2019 v Netherlands

Career statistics
Competition	ODI	T20I	FC	LA
Matches	11	10	3	17
Runs scored	9	7	7	22
Batting average	4.50	7.00	7.00	5.50
100s/50s	0/0	0/0	0/0	0/0
Top score	4	5*	6*	7*
Balls bowled	516	192	288	768
Wickets	8	9	5	15
Bowling average	58.37	28.11	34.00	41.40
5 wickets in innings	0	0	0	0
10 wickets in match	0	n/a	0	0
Best bowling	2/38	2/18	3/43	3/48
Catches/stumpings	1/–	2/–	2/–	1/–
- Source: ESPNcricinfo, 1 October 2021

Qadeer Ahmed Khan (Urdu: قدیر احمد) (born 15 November 1985) is a Pakistani-born cricketer who played for the United Arab Emirates national cricket team. He made his One Day International debut for the UAE against Hong Kong in the 2015–17 ICC World Cricket League Championship on 18 November 2015. He made his Twenty20 International debut against Oman on 22 November 2015.

In January 2018, Khan was named in the UAE squad for the 2018 ICC World Cricket League Division Two tournament. In December 2018, he was named in the United Arab Emirates' team for the 2018 ACC Emerging Teams Asia Cup.

In September 2019, he was named in the squad for the 2019 ICC T20 World Cup Qualifier tournament in the UAE. However, the following month, he was dropped from the UAE's squad for the tournament. Two days before the start of the tournament, the International Cricket Council confirmed that Khan had been suspended, after breaching ICC's anti-corruption rules. In April 2021, he was banned from all cricket for five years over corruption charge, with effect from 16 October 2019.
