= Muhammad Usman (cricketer) =

Emirati cricketer (born 1985)

Personal information
- Born: 13 October 1985 (age 41); Lahore, Punjab, Pakistan
- Batting: Left-handed
- Role: Middle order batsman

International information
- National side: United Arab Emirates (2016–2022)
- ODI debut (cap 67): 14 August 2016 v Scotland
- Last ODI: 8 February 2022 v Oman
- T20I debut (cap 27): 3 February 2016 v Netherlands
- Last T20I: 22 February 2022 v Nepal

Career statistics
Competition	ODI	T20I	FC	LA
Matches	38	47	5	57
Runs scored	1,008	891	217	1,470
Batting average	31.50	24.08	27.12	34.18
100s/50s	1/4	0/3	1/0	1/9
Top score	102*	89*	103	102*
Catches/stumpings	11/–	12/–	0/–	17/–
- Source: Cricinfo, 28 June 2024

Muhammad Usman (Urdu: محمد عثمان) (born: 13 October 1985) is a Pakistani-born cricketer who played for the United Arab Emirates national cricket team until his retirement in June 2024. He made his first-class debut against the Netherlands in the 2015–17 ICC Intercontinental Cup on 21 January 2016. Usman's List A debut was also against the Netherlands, in the 2015–17 ICC World Cricket League Championship, on 27 January 2016. His Twenty20 International debut too was against the Netherlands on 3 February 2016. Usman made his One Day International debut against Scotland on 14 August 2016 in the 2015–17 ICC World Cricket League Championship.

In April 2017, Usman scored his maiden first-class century in round five of the 2015–17 ICC Intercontinental Cup against Papua New Guinea.

In January 2018, he was named in the UAE's squad for the 2018 ICC World Cricket League Division Two tournament. In August 2018, he was named in the United Arab Emirates' squad for the 2018 Asia Cup Qualifier tournament. In December 2018, he was named in the UAE's team for the 2018 ACC Emerging Teams Asia Cup.

In September 2019, he was named in the UAE's squad for the 2019 ICC T20 World Cup Qualifier tournament in the UAE. Usman was the leading run-scorer for the UAE in the tournament, with 192 runs in eight matches. In December 2020, he was one of ten cricketers to be awarded a year-long full-time contract by the Emirates Cricket Board. The following month, in the UAE's first fixture against Ireland, Usman scored his first ODI century.

On 28 June 2024, he announced his retirement from international cricket.
