= Mohammad Naveed =

Emirati cricketer (born 1987)

Personal information
- Full name: Mohammad Naveed
- Born: 3 June 1987 (age 39); Dubai, United Arab Emirates
- Batting: Right-handed
- Bowling: Right-arm medium
- Role: Bowler

International information
- National side: United Arab Emirates (2014–2019)
- ODI debut (cap 51): 2 May 2014 v Afghanistan
- Last ODI: 16 April 2019 v Zimbabwe
- T20I debut (cap 15): 9 July 2015 v Scotland
- Last T20I: 6 August 2019 v Netherlands

Career statistics
Competition	ODI	T20I	FC	LA
Matches	39	31	7	80
Runs scored	397	176	29	654
Batting average	16.54	12.57	4.14	14.53
100s/50s	0/0	0/0	0/0	0/1
Top score	45	27*	17	56
Balls bowled	1,938	688	1,012	3,878
Wickets	53	37	16	114
Bowling average	33.15	19.70	35.25	28.06
5 wickets in innings	1	0	0	1
10 wickets in match	0	0	0	0
Best bowling	5/28	3/14	4/78	5/28
Catches/stumpings	6/–	4/–	2/–	11/–
- Source: Cricinfo, 1 October 2021

Mohammad Naveed (born 3 June 1987) is a cricketer who played for the United Arab Emirates national cricket team. He made his One Day International (ODI) debut against Afghanistan on 2 May 2014 and his Twenty20 International (T20I) debut against Scotland in the 2015 ICC World Twenty20 Qualifier tournament on 9 July 2015. In January 2019, he captained the UAE for the first time in an ODI, in their home series against Nepal. In March 2021, Naveed was found guilty of corruption and banned from all cricket for eight years.

== Career ==
In January 2018, Naveed was named in the UAE squad for the 2018 ICC World Cricket League Division Two tournament.

On 4 March 2018, in the UAE's match against Papua New Guinea in the 2018 Cricket World Cup Qualifier, Naveed took his first five-wicket haul in an ODI. The UAE won the match by 56 runs, and Naveed was named the man of the match. On 22 March 2018, in the UAE's final match of the Cricket World Cup Qualifier, against Zimbabwe, Naveed took three wickets for 40 runs, and was again named the man of the match. On 3 June 2018, he was selected to play for the Toronto Nationals in the players' draft for the inaugural edition of the Global T20 Canada tournament.

He was part of the United Arab Emirates squad for the 2018 Asia Cup Qualifier tournament. In September 2018, he was named in Kandahar's squad in the first edition of the Afghanistan Premier League tournament.

In December 2018, he was named in the United Arab Emirates' team for the 2018 ACC Emerging Teams Asia Cup.

In January 2019, he was named as the captain of the United Arab Emirates' ODI squad for their series against Nepal. This was after the UAE's regular captain, Rohan Mustafa, was suspended by the Emirates Cricket Board (ECB) for breaching the ECB's Player's Code of Conduct.

In June 2019, he was selected to play for the Montreal Tigers franchise team in the 2019 Global T20 Canada tournament.

=== Ban from cricket ===
In September 2019, he was named as the captain of the United Arab Emirates' squad for the 2019 ICC T20 World Cup Qualifier tournament in the UAE. However, the following month Naveed was withdrawn from the UAE's squad, with Ahmed Raza named as captain in his place. Two days before the start of the tournament, the ICC confirmed that Naveed had been suspended, after breaching cricket's anti-corruption rules. In February 2020, Naveed said that he wanted to clear his name, but could face a ban of up to ten years if the corruption charges are proven.

In January 2021, the ICC found him guilty of corruption in relation to attempted match-fixing. In March 2021, Naveed was given an eight-year ban from playing ICC cricket, backdated to 16 October 2019, after being found guilty on charges of corruption. In response to the ban, Naveed issued a statement saying that he was not involved in match-fixing and his only mistake was not reporting a corrupt approach.
