= Amjad Javed =

Emirati cricketer (born 1980)

Personal information
- Full name: Amjad Javed
- Born: 5 July 1980 (age 46); Dubai, United Arab Emirates
- Height: 6 ft 3 in (1.91 m)
- Batting: Right-handed
- Bowling: Right-arm medium
- Role: All-rounder

International information
- National side: United Arab Emirates
- ODI debut (cap 32): 24 June 2008 v Bangladesh
- Last ODI: 15 March 2015 v West Indies
- T20I debut (cap 2): 17 March 2014 v Netherlands
- Last T20I: 10 July 2015 v Afghanistan

Career statistics
Competition	ODI	T20I	FC	LA
Matches	15	22	15	81
Runs scored	239	271	392	1,370
Batting average	19.91	18.06	17.04	22.45
100s/50s	0/1	0/1	1/1	2/4
Top score	56	76	100	164
Balls bowled	618	446	1,732	3,066
Wickets	9	33	34	78
Bowling average	67.55	16.96	26.79	32.35
5 wickets in innings	0	0	0	1
10 wickets in match	0	0	0	0
Best bowling	3/60	3/12	4/48	6/50
Catches/stumpings	8/–	4/–	4/–	18/–
- Source: ESPN cricinfo, 12 June 2019

Amjad Javed (Urdu: امجد جاوید; born 5 July 1980) is a former cricketer who played for the United Arab Emirates national cricket team. He is a right-handed allrounder who bowls right-arm medium. He is one of the few cricketers for the UAE who had played Asia Cup.

Amjad Javed's grandfather moved to Dubai from Lahore, Pakistan 50 years ago, when his father was only 2 years old. Amjad Javed is of Pakistani descent but born and raised in the UAE. He also worked for the airline Emirates as a baggage handler. Amjad took retirement from all forms of cricket on 22 December 2018.

== Playing career ==
He made his One Day International debut for the United Arab Emirates against Bangladesh at Gaddafi Stadium in 2008 Asia Cup. He scored 10 runs in which he hit a four and six and then bowled two overs without any success.

In World Cup Qualifier, Javed hit a blistering 164 from 117 balls, laced with 17 fours and eight sixes at Senwes Park in Potchefstroom as the UAE completed a 112-run win over Denmark.

In 2010, in a List-A match against Bermuda, Javed hit blitzed 89 off 59 balls which included seven fours and five sixes as UAE extended their domination over Bermuda with a thumping 134-run win at the National Stadium.

In 2012, Javed finished with the best figures 4 for 49 against Netherlands in the Intercontinental Cup played at Deventer.

In the 2015 ICC World Cup Qualifier, Javed blasted a 31-ball 63 to lift the team to 246 for 8 as United Arab Emirates held their nerve to secure a narrow 13-run win against Kenya at Hagley Oval in Christchurch, putting an end to Kenya's hopes of extending their streak of five consecutive World Cup appearances.

In the 2015 ICC Cricket World Cup clash v Ireland, he along with Shaiman Anwar set the highest ever World Cup record partnership of 107 runs for the 7th wicket. In fact, this pair of batsmen became the first pair to have had a 100+ runstand for the 7th wicket in World Cup history.

Just after a month later, in the 2015 ICC Cricket World Cup, Amjad Javed along with Nasir Aziz put on a 107 run stand against West Indies for the 7th wicket and created history for the joint highest ever World Cup 7th wicket partnership. Javed is the only player in the world to involve in more than one 100+ stand for the 7th wicket in Cricket World Cup history.

He holds the record for facing the most number of balls in a T20I innings when batting at number seven position(46)
