= Shaiman Anwar =

Emirati cricketer (born 1979)

Personal information
- Full name: Shaiman Anwar Butt
- Born: 15 March 1979 (age 47); Sialkot, Punjab, Pakistan
- Batting: Right-handed
- Bowling: Right-arm medium-fast
- Role: Batsman
- Relatives: Arsalan Anwar (brother)

International information
- National side: United Arab Emirates (2014–2019)
- ODI debut (cap 47): 1 February 2014 v Scotland
- Last ODI: 16 April 2019 v Zimbabwe
- T20I debut (cap 9): 17 March 2014 v Netherlands
- Last T20I: 16 March 2019 v USA

Domestic team information
- Years: Team
- 2002–2003: Sialkot
- 2005: Sialkot Stallions
- 2005: Servis Industries

Career statistics
Competition	ODI	T20I	FC	LA
Matches	40	32	18	102
Runs scored	1,219	971	877	3,140
Batting average	31.25	33.48	32.48	32.04
100s/50s	1/11	1/6	2/5	5/22
Top score	106	117*	148	123
Balls bowled	117	–	6	311
Wickets	4	–	0	15
Bowling average	33.50	–	–	22.40
5 wickets in innings	0	–	–	0
10 wickets in match	0	–	–	0
Best bowling	3/61	–	–	4/31
Catches/stumpings	12/–	11/–	12/–	32/–
- Source: ESPNCricinfo, 12 June 2019

Shaiman Anwar Butt (Urdu: انور این شیما; born 15 March 1979) is a former cricketer who played for the United Arab Emirates national cricket team. A powerful right-handed top-order batsman, he made his debut for the United Arab Emirates national side in December 2010, having previously represented Sialkot and Servis Industries in Pakistani domestic tournaments. In March 2021, Shaiman was found guilty of corruption and banned from all cricket for eight years.

== Personal life ==
As of February 2015, Shaiman lived in Dubai with his wife and children, working as an administrative executive at a petroleum storage terminal in Al Quoz. His younger brother, Arsalan Anwar, also played at first-class level for Sialkot, but retired early to concentrate on his career.

== Domestic and T20 franchise career ==
Born in Sialkot, Shaiman made his debut for Sialkot in March 2002, during the 2001–02 season of the One-Day National Tournament. He made his first-class debut during the following season of the Quaid-i-Azam Trophy, and in his third match, against the Lahore Whites, scored a maiden century. Opening the batting with Usman Mushtaq, Shaiman scored 106 runs from 118 balls, putting on a 177-run opening stand. Later in the season, against Faisalabad in the limited-overs competition, he scored 96 from 91 balls, and was named man of the match. Despite his good form during the 2002–03 season, in the next season Shaiman played only at lower grades. However, he did play a single Twenty20 match for the Sialkot Stallions in the ABN-AMRO Twenty-20 Cup during the inaugural 2004–05 season, as well as one Patron's Trophy match for Servis Industries during the 2005–06 season.

Having previously played club cricket, Shaiman moved permanently to the UAE in 2007, after gaining employment with a shipping firm. His first matches for Emirati representative sides came during the 2009–10 season, when he played for United Arab Emirates A against Pakistan A and the England Lions. After meeting the qualification requirements, Shaiman made his senior debut for the UAE national team in the final of the 2009–10 ICC Intercontinental Shield, which the team lost to Namibia. Shaiman was a regular for the UAE afterwards, and across the 2011–13 WCL Championship, scored 625 runs from 14 matches, the most for any player.

On 3 June 2018, he was selected to play for the Edmonton Royals in the players' draft for the inaugural edition of the Global T20 Canada tournament. In June 2019, he was selected to play for the Winnipeg Hawks franchise team in the 2019 Global T20 Canada tournament.

== International career ==
He made his One Day International (ODI) debut in February 2014, against Scotland in the final of the World Cup Qualifier, and his Twenty20 International (T20I) debut in March 2014, against the Netherlands in the World Twenty20. Shaiman was selected in the Emirati squad for the 2015 World Cup, and in the team's first match, against Zimbabwe, top scored with 67 from 50 balls. In the next match, against Ireland, he scored 106 from 83 balls, becoming the second UAE player to hit an ODI century (after Khurram Khan) and the first to do so in a World Cup.

In the 2015 ICC Cricket World Cup clash v Ireland, he along with Amjad Javed set the World Cup record partnership of 107 runs for the 7th wicket, which was eclipsed in July 2019 by MS Dhoni, RA Jadeja. In fact, this pair of batsmen became the first pair to have had a 100+ run stand for the 7th wicket in World Cup history.

On 14 April 2017, he became the first player for the United Arab Emirates to score a century in a T20I match, when did against Papua New Guinea at the Sheikh Zayed Cricket Stadium, Abu Dhabi. Anwar also became the first UAE player to score centuries in both ODIs and T20Is.

He also holds the record for facing the most number of balls in a T20I innings when batting at number three position (68).

In January 2018, he was named in the United Arab Emirates' squad for the 2018 ICC World Cricket League Division Two tournament.

In March 2018, during the United Arab Emirates match against Zimbabwe in the 2018 Cricket World Cup Qualifier, Anwar became the first batsman for the United Arab Emirates to score 1,000 runs in ODIs. In August 2018, he was named in the United Arab Emirates' squad for the 2018 Asia Cup Qualifier tournament. In December 2018, he was named in the United Arab Emirates' team for the 2018 ACC Emerging Teams Asia Cup.

In September 2019, he was named in the United Arab Emirates' squad for the 2019 ICC T20 World Cup Qualifier tournament in the UAE. Ahead of the tournament, the International Cricket Council (ICC) named him as the key player in the UAE's squad. However, the following month, he was dropped from the UAE's squad for the tournament. Two days before the start of the tournament, the ICC confirmed that Anwar had been suspended, after breaching cricket's anti-corruption rules. In January 2021, the ICC found him guilty of corruption in relation to attempted match-fixing. In March 2021, Shaiman was given an eight-year ban from all cricket, backdated to 16 October 2019, after being found guilty on charges of corruption.
