= List of United Arab Emirates ODI cricketers =

List of cricketers

This is a list of United Arab Emirates' One-day International cricketers. A One Day International (ODI) is an international cricket match between two representative teams, each having ODI status, as determined by the International Cricket Council (ICC). An ODI differs from Test matches in that the number of overs per team is limited, and that each team has only one innings. This list is arranged in the order in which each player won his first ODI cap for the UAE. Where more than one player won his first ODI cap in the same match, those players are listed alphabetically by surname - or, in the case of Muslims, by first name.

== Key ==
General

- ‡ – Captain
- † – Wicket-keeper
- First – Year of debut
- Last – Year of latest game
- Mat – Number of matches played

Batting

- Runs – Runs scored in career
- HS – Highest score
- Avg – Runs scored per dismissal
- * – Batsman remained not out

Bowling

- Balls – Balls bowled in career
- Wkt – Wickets taken in career
- BBI – Best bowling in an innings
- Ave – Average runs per wicket
- 5WI – Five wickets or more in a match

Fielding

- Ca – Catches taken
- St – Stumpings taken

== Players ==
Statistics are correct as of 4 November 2026.

United Arab Emirates ODI cricketers
General					Batting					Bowling					Fielding		Ref(s)
Cap	Name	First	Last	Mat	Runs	HS	Avg	50	100	Balls	Wkt	BBI	Ave	5WI	Ca	St	Ref(s)
1	Arshad Laeeq	1994	1996	6	101	43*	20.20	0	0	198	1	1/25	198.00	0	1	0	
2	Azhar Saeed	1994	1996	7	61	32	8.71	0	0	271	6	3/45	35.50	0	2	0	
3	Imtiaz Abbasi †	1994	1996	7	12	6*	6.00	0	0	–	–	–	–	–	4	2	
4	Mazhar Hussain	1994	1996	7	179	70	25.57	1	0	48	0	–	–	0	1	0	
5	Vijay Mehra	1994	1996	6	92	43	18.40	0	0	–	–	–	–	–	1	0	
6	Mohammad Ishaq	1994	1996	5	98	51*	24.50	1	0	–	–	–	–	–	1	0	
7	Riaz Poonawala	1994	1994	2	44	22	22.00	0	0	–	–	–	–	–	1	0	
8	Saleem Raza	1994	1996	6	159	84	26.50	1	0	192	3	1/17	59.66	0	0	0	
9	Johanne Samarasekera	1994	1996	7	124	47*	31.00	0	0	294	4	1/17	59.00	0	1	0	
10	Sohail Butt	1994	1994	2	8	6*	8.00	0	0	78	2	2/52	39.50	0	0	0	
11	Sultan Zarawani ‡	1994	1996	7	26	13	4.33	0	0	264	5	2/49	51.40	0	1	0	
12	Shaukat Dukanwala	1996	1996	5	84	40*	42.00	0	0	198	6	5/29	25.50	1	2	0	
13	Mohammad Aslam	1996	1996	4	38	23	9.50	0	0	–	–	–	–	–	1	0	
14	Ganesh Mylvaganam	1996	1996	3	36	23	12.00	0	0	–	–	–	–	–	1	0	
15	Shehzad Altaf	1996	1996	2	–	–	–	–	–	78	1	1/15	37.00	0	0	0	
16	Saeed-Al-Saffar	1996	1996	1	–	–	–	–	–	18	0	–	–	0	1	0	
17	Abdul Rehman †	2004	2004	1	1	1	1.00	0	0	–	–	–	–	–	0	0	
18	Ali Asad	2004	2004	2	21	12	21.00	0	0	120	2	2/35	36.50	0	0	0	
19	Arshad Ali	2004	2008	4	54	41	13.50	0	0	102	1	1/5	105.00	0	1	0	
20	Asghar Ali †	2004	2004	2	14	14	7.00	0	0	–	–	–	–	–	0	0	
21	Asim Saeed	2004	2004	2	12	12	6.00	0	0	54	1	1/25	40.00	0	0	0	
22	Fahad Usman	2004	2004	2	9	9	4.50	0	0	–	–	–	–	–	1	0	
23	Khurram Khan ‡	2004	2015	16	582	132*	41.57	3	1	498	12	4/32	36.00	0	6	0	
24	Mohammad Tauqir ‡	2004	2015	11	95	55	13.57	1	0	491	9	2/38	42.55	0	5	0	
25	Naeemuddin Aslam	2004	2004	2	12	12	6.00	0	0	–	–	–	–	–	1	0	
26	Rizwan Latif	2004	2004	1	0	0	0.00	0	0	54	2	2/69	34.50	0	0	0	
27	Syed Maqsood	2004	2004	2	18	13	9.00	0	0	66	1	1/60	84.00	0	1	0	
28	Ramveer Rai	2004	2004	1	39	39	39.00	0	0	–	–	–	–	–	0	0	
29	Sameer Zia	2004	2004	1	2	2*	–	0	0	60	1	1/44	44.00	0	2	0	
30	Amjad Ali †	2008	2015	17	520	98	30.58	3	0	–	–	–	–	–	11	1	
31	Amjad Javed	2008	2017	15	239	56	19.91	1	0	618	9	3/60	67.55	0	8	0	
32	Indika Batuwitarachchi	2008	2008	2	14	14	7.00	0	0	–	–	–	–	–	2	0	
33	Fahad Alhashmi	2008	2015	5	0	0	0.00	0	0	224	6	2/39	33.66	0	0	0	
34	Saqib Ali ‡	2008	2014	5	84	25*	21.00	0	0	60	1	1/44	57.00	0	2	0	
35	Vikrant Shetty	2008	2014	2	16	9	8.00	0	0	–	–	–	–	–	0	0	
36	Shadeep Silva	2008	2008	1	7	7	7.00	0	0	42	0	–	–	0	0	0	
37	Zahid Shah	2008	2008	2	11	6*	–	0	0	120	6	3/49	16.33	0	0	0	
38	Alawi Shukri	2008	2008	1	1	1	1.00	0	0	–	–	–	–	–	0	0	
39	Aman Ali	2008	2008	1	0	0	0.00	0	0	12	0	–	–	0	0	0	
40	Nizel Fernandes	2008	2008	1	5	5	5.00	0	0	–	–	–	–	–	0	0	
41	Ahmed Raza ‡	2014	2022	53	409	50	12.02	1	0	2,801	64	5/26	30.06	1	25	0	
42	Manjula Guruge	2014	2015	7	16	10*	–	0	0	351	12	4/56	28.08	0	1	0	
43	Kamran Shazad	2014	2015	4	22	13	11.00	0	0	222	7	3/41	29.85	0	1	0	
44	Swapnil Patil †	2014	2015	13	263	99*	26.30	2	0	–	–	–	–	–	8	3	
45	Rohan Mustafa ‡	2014	2023	81	1,504	109	21.48	7	1	3,787	85	5/25	33.29	1	35	0	
46	Salman Faris	2014	2014	3	43	27	14.33	0	0	–	–	–	–	–	0	0	
47	Shaiman Anwar	2014	2019	40	1,219	106	31.25	11	1	117	4	3/61	33.50	0	12	0	
48	Fayyaz Ahmed	2014	2016	3	47	37*	47.00	0	0	162	0	–	–	0	0	0	
49	Irfan Sajid	2014	2014	1	2	2	2.00	0	0	30	0	–	–	0	0	0	
50	Krishna Chandran	2014	2016	12	134	43	16.75	0	0	418	7	3/45	61.57	0	5	0	
51	Mohammad Naveed ‡	2014	2019	39	397	45	16.54	0	0	1,938	53	5/28	33.15	1	6	0	
52	Mohammad Shahzad	2014	2016	6	190	79	31.66	2	0	240	9	4/26	25.88	0	2	0	
53	Andri Berenger	2014	2015	10	205	66	20.50	2	0	–	–	–	–	–	2	0	
54	Salman Farooq	2014	2014	1	–	–	–	–	–	36	0	–	–	0	0	0	
55	Nasir Aziz	2014	2015	5	82	60	27.33	1	0	264	3	1/50	85.66	0	0	0	
56	Saqlain Haider †	2014	2016	5	58	28	14.50	0	0	–	–	–	–	–	1	1	
57	Abdul Shakoor †	2015	2018	3	54	24	18.00	0	0	–	–	–	–	–	4	1	
58	Asif Iqbal	2015	2015	1	8	8	8.00	0	0	24	0	–	–	0	0	0	
59	Yodhin Punja	2015	2015	1	1	1	1.00	0	0	36	0	–	–	0	0	0	
60	Laxman Sreekumar	2015	2016	4	61	28	15.25	0	0	36	0	–	–	0	1	0	
61	Umair Ali	2015	2015	2	20	10	10.00	0	0	108	1	1/65	125.00	0	1	0	
62	Zaheer Maqsood	2015	2015	2	13	8*	–	0	0	120	4	2/56	29.00	0	0	0	
63	Qadeer Ahmed	2015	2019	11	9	4	4.50	0	0	516	8	2/38	58.37	0	1	0	
64	Usman Mushtaq	2015	2015	1	3	3	3.00	0	0	12	0	–	–	0	0	0	
65	Muhammad Usman	2016	2022	38	1,008	102*	31.50	4	1	–	–	–	–	–	11	0	
66	Rameez Shahzad	2016	2023	26	936	121*	40.69	5	2	30	0	–	–	0	6	0	
67	Adnan Mufti	2017	2018	18	330	57*	27.50	1	0	–	–	–	–	–	4	0	
68	Ghulam Shabber †	2017	2019	23	500	90	21.73	4	0	–	–	–	–	–	30	2	
69	Imran Haider	2017	2019	20	58	18*	8.28	0	0	943	32	4/25	26.28	0	5	0	
70	Mohammed Qasim	2017	2017	5	94	41	18.80	0	0	120	2	1/13	35.50	0	2	0	
71	Zahoor Khan	2017	2024	62	152	23	6.60	0	0	2,880	93	6/34	25.86	1	14	0	
72	Ashfaq Ahmed	2018	2019	16	344	92	21.50	2	0	223	4	2/55	46.25	0	6	0	
73	Mohammad Boota †	2018	2019	9	191	59*	23.87	1	0	12	0	–	–	0	0	1	
74	Amir Hayat	2018	2019	9	31	24*	10.33	0	0	449	11	3/19	34.72	0	4	0	
75	Chirag Suri	2018	2023	37	946	115	25.56	5	2	–	–	–	–	–	10	0	
76	Fahad Nawaz	2019	2019	2	2	2	1.00	0	0	–	–	–	–	–	0	0	
77	Chundangapoyil Rizwan	2019	2024	42	948	109	27.88	4	1	58	1	1/19	50.00	0	9	0	
78	Sultan Ahmed	2019	2019	2	18	11	9.00	0	0	72	0	–	–	0	0	0	
79	Vriitya Aravind ‡†	2019	2024	61	1,843	115*	31.77	9	2	–	–	–	–	–	37	9	
80	Basil Hameed	2019	2026	55	1,141	71	24.80	5	0	1,606	46	5/17	25.13	1	21	0	
81	Darius D'Silva	2019	2020	6	53	31	13.25	0	0	186	6	3/22	19.66	0	1	0	
82	Junaid Siddique	2019	2026	71	155	16*	5.34	0	0	3,322	100	6/49	28.24	1	5	0	
83	Karthik Meiyappan	2019	2023	31	163	24	9.05	0	0	1,208	37	4/37	30.10	0	10	0	
84	Waheed Ahmed	2019	2021	7	73	23	14.60	0	0	120	1	1/20	94.00	0	4	0	
85	Jonathan Figy	2019	2020	2	55	32*	55.00	0	0	–	–	–	–	–	1	0	
86	Zawar Farid	2020	2023	10	132	32*	18.85	0	0	201	8	4/30	23.37	0	1	0	
87	Kashif Daud	2021	2022	19	282	76*	28.20	2	0	663	16	3/41	30.12	0	3	0	
88	Alishan Sharafu ‡	2021	2025	28	433	58	16.65	1	0	12	0	–	–	0	14	0	
89	Muhammad Waseem ‡	2022	2026	73	1,855	119	25.41	9	1	71	0	–	–	0	36	0	
90	Akif Raja	2022	2022	5	1	0	0.00	0	0	228	3	1/19	53.33	0	2	0	
91	Asif Khan	2022	2025	38	1,270	151*	38.48	7	3	–	–	–	–	–	9	0	
92	Rahul Bhatia	2022	2024	9	51	24*	7.28	0	0	344	3	1/43	111.66	0	0	0	
93	Sabir Ali	2022	2023	4	12	7	6.00	0	0	102	3	2/50	30.33	0	2	0	
94	Aryan Lakra	2022	2023	16	387	84	24.18	4	0	318	6	3/38	46.66	0	8	0	
95	Aayan Afzal Khan	2022	2026	48	702	94*	22.64	3	0	2,420	63	5/34	27.22	1	8	0	
96	Hazrat Bilal	2022	2023	7	24	20*	24.00	0	0	270	8	4/47	26.50	0	0	0	
97	Vishnu Sukumaran	2022	2024	10	194	97	19.40	1	0	120	3	1/10	27.00	0	2	0	
98	Ashwanth Valthapa †	2023	2023	3	14	14	14.00	0	0	–	–	–	–	–	3	1	
99	Sanchit Sharma	2023	2024	10	91	44	22.75	0	0	342	11	3/37	29.36	0	4	0	
100	Matiullah Khan	2023	2023	1	0	0*	–	0	0	30	1	1/37	26.50	0	0	0	
101	Ansh Tandon	2023	2023	1	10	10	10.00}	0	0	–	–	–	–	–	0	0	
102	Aryansh Sharma †	2023	2026	30	742	105	24.73	4	1	–	–	–	–	–	28	1	
103	Ali Naseer	2023	2026	20	409	61	24.05	3	0	775	22	4/26	33.31	0	3	0	
104	Adhitya Shetty	2023	2023	1	–	–	–	–	–	60	1	1/56	56.00	0	1	0	
105	Lovepreet Singh	2023	2023	2	9	6	4.50	0	0	–	–	–	–	–	2	0	
106	Ethan D'Souza	2023	2023	3	9	6	4.50	0	0	–	–	–	–	–	2	0	
107	Muhammad Jawadullah	2023	2026	17	16	13*	4.00	0	0	722	20	3/36	34.70	0	2	0	
108	Rahul Chopra ‡	2024	2026	29	911	127*	37.95	3	3	6	1	1/6	6.00	0	11	0	
109	Tanish Suri	2024	2026	13	338	78	28.16	1	0	–	–	–	–	–	5	0	
110	Zuhaib Zubair	2024	2026	4	39	31	9.75	0	0	150	0	–	–	0	0	0	
111	Omid Shafi Rahman	2024	2024	2	1	1	1.00	0	0	78	0	–	–	0	0	0	
112	Muhammad Farooq	2024	2024	1	4	4	4.00	0	0	36	0	–	–	0	0	0	
113	Dhruv Parashar	2023	2026	13	198	50*	22.00	1	0	548	10	2/16	40.30	0	3	0	
114	Sagar Kalyan	2025	2025	4	55	21	13.75	0	0	–	–	–	–	–	4	0	
115	Simranjeet Singh	2025	2025	6	31	14	10.33	0	0	342	12	4/30	20.58	0	0	0	
116	Haider Ali	2025	2026	10	26	10	4.33	0	0	546	6	1/28	61.00	0	3	0	
117	Harshit Kaushik	2025	2025	4	80	53	20.00	0	0	114	0	–	–	0	1	0	
118	Muhammad Rohid	2025	2026	6	14	8*	–	0	0	330	6	2/21	39.16	0	1	0	
119	Muhammad Shahdad	2025	2026	16	569	114	35.56	4	1	322	8	2/32	38.37	0	6	0	
120	Sohaib Khan	2025	2026	13	210	52	17.50	1	0	7	0	–	–	0	0	0	
121	Zahid Ali	2025	2025	3	16	11*	16.00	0	0	114	5	4/41	26.40	0	0	0	
122	Nilansh Keshwani	2026	2026	2	18	18	9.00	0	0	54	1	1/37	57.00	0	1	0	
123	Khuzaima Tanveer	2026	2026	13	83	49	10.37	0	0	572	16	4/43	29.25	0	1	0	
124	Ajay Kumar	2026	2026	4	3	2	3.00	0	0	221	11	6/35	15.36	1	0	0	
125	Akshdeep Nath	2026	2026	15	347	99	26.69	2	0	186	2	2/35	93.50	0	6	0	
126	Harpreet Singh Bhatia ‡	2026	2026	12	427	81	38.81	3	0	–	–	–	–	–	6	0	
127	Adeeb Usmani †	2026	2026	14	501	116	41.75	3	1	66	2	1/15	32.00	0	14	0	
128	Jash Giyanani	2026	2026	1	4	4	4.00	0	0	18	0	–	–	0	0	0	
129	Muhammad Arfan	2026	2026	5	10	9*	10.00	0	0	221	7	3/38	27.14	0	0	0	
130	Ibrar Ahmed	2026	2026	4	4	3	2.00	0	0	132	6	4/62	28.33	0	1	0	
131	Muhammad Mohsin	2026	2026	1	0	0	0.00	0	0	36	0	–	–	0	0	0	
132	Awais Ali Shah	2026	2026	5	64	24*	32.00	0	0	262	7	5/33	28.28	1	0	0	
