= Rohan Mustafa =

Emirati cricketer

Personal information
- Born: 7 October 1988 (age 38); Kohat, Khyber Pakhtunkhwa, Pakistan
- Batting: Left-handed
- Bowling: Right-arm off break
- Role: All Rounder

International information
- National side: United Arab Emirates (2014-2023)
- ODI debut (cap 45): 1 February 2014 v Scotland
- Last ODI: 9 June 2023 v West Indies
- T20I debut (cap 8): 22 October 2018 v Australia
- Last T20I: 19 February 2023 v Afghanistan

Domestic team information
- Years: Team
- 2024: Sudurpaschim Royals

Career statistics
Competition	ODI	T20I	FC	LA
Matches	76	55	6	99
Runs scored	1420	984	222	2,179
Batting average	21.84	20.93	27.75	25.04
100s/50s	1/7	0/4	0/1	1/11
Top score	109	77	68	109
Balls bowled	3607	1,064	576	4,321
Wickets	81	61	6	108
Bowling average	32.64	19.96	47.50	29.29
5 wickets in innings	1	0	0	3
10 wickets in match	1	0	0	0
Best bowling	5/25	4/18	3/38	5/25
Catches/stumpings	34/–	23/–	2/–	47/–
- Source: ESPNCricinfo, 10 June 2023

Rohan Mustafa (Pashto: روحان مصطفی; born 7 October 1988) is a Pakistani-born cricketer who has played for the United Arab Emirates national cricket team since 2007. He is a former national captain, and plays as a left-handed batsman and right-arm off-spin bowler.

== Early life ==
Mustafa was born in Kohat, in Pakistan's Khyber Pakhtunkhwa province. When he was 10 his family moved to the UAE, where his father had a car sales business in Sharjah. He enrolled in the Sharjah Cricket Academy to pursue his career in cricket and his father provided him huge support to fulfill his cricketing ambitions. His father was also one of his cricketing mentors from a young age.

Mustafa's father died suddenly when he was 15. His family returned to Pakistan soon afterwards. He initially struggled to cope following his father's death and also endured difficulties to pursue his cricket career due to the financial constraints faced by the family. He was eventually picked for the UAE U-19 national team in 2007. His mother and sister currently live in Pakistan while his brother has relocated to Chile.

== Franchise career ==
On 3 June 2018, Mustafa was selected to play for the Toronto Nationals in the players' draft for the inaugural edition of the Global T20 Canada tournament. In June 2019, he was selected to play for the Brampton Wolves franchise team in the 2019 Global T20 Canada tournament.

== International career ==
He made his List-A debut for the UAE against Oman on 30 November 2007 during the 2007 ICC World Cricket League Division Two tournament. He made his first-class debut on 12 March 2013 against Ireland at Sharjah at the 2011–2013 ICC Intercontinental Cup. He made his T20 debut against Ireland on 21 March 2013.

Mustafa made his One Day International debut against Scotland on 1 February 2014. One month later, on 17 March 2014, he also made his Twenty20 International debut against the Netherlands during the 2014 ICC World Twenty20. After the 2014 ICC World Twenty20, Mustafa was appointed vice-captain of the UAE.

In September 2014, he faced a major legal battle when a Dubai court banned him from entering the country for one year after being found guilty of absconding from duty. He was accused of being in breach of contract for playing for another corporation without written permission from his employers.

He immediately returned to Pakistan but he won the court appeal and was able to overturn the court order as he was able to obtain the no objection certificate with the combined assistance from former UAE head coach Aqib Javed, Emirates Cricket Board and from his former employers. The appeal was successfully upheld in November 2014 and as a result he was back in contention for a spot in the national team for the 2015 Cricket World Cup.

At the 2016 Asia Cup Qualifier, Mustafa scored 77 runs from 50 balls in the first match against Afghanistan, opening the batting with Muhammad Kaleem. This set a new record for the highest score by a UAE player in a Twenty20 International. Mustafa also took three wickets in Afghanistan's innings, which is also a record in international taking 3 wickets and 75+ runs in a same match with the UAE going on to win the match by 16 runs.

On 4 April 2017, Mustafa scored his maiden One Day International century, scoring 109 against Papua New Guinea. In the same match, he took his maiden five-wicket haul, taking 5/25. In doing so, he became only the third player to score a century and take a five-wicket haul in the same ODI after Viv Richards and Paul Collingwood.

In January 2018, he was named as the captain of the UAE squad for the 2018 ICC World Cricket League Division Two tournament. He was included in Emirati squad for the 2018 Cricket World Cup Qualifier tournament. During a crucial super six match between UAE and Zimbabwe during the 2018 World Cup Qualifier, he and Sean Williams were reprimanded for breaching Level 1 of the ICC Code of Conduct and were handed one demerit point each.

In August 2018, he was named the captain of the United Arab Emirates' squad for the 2018 Asia Cup Qualifier tournament. In December 2018, he was named as the captain of the United Arab Emirates' team for the 2018 ACC Emerging Teams Asia Cup. Later the same month, he was one of three players to be given an eight-week ban from international cricket for breaching the Emirates Cricket Board's Player's Code of Conduct, after using Twitter to criticise the facilities in Karachi during the tournament. In January 2019, the Pakistan Cricket Board (PCB) had accepted apologies from all the cricketers involved. In March 2019, he returned to the UAE's squad following his suspension for their series against the United States.

In September 2019, he was named in the United Arab Emirates' squad for the 2019 ICC T20 World Cup Qualifier tournament in the UAE. Ahead of the tournament, the International Cricket Council (ICC) named him as the key player in the UAE's squad. He was the leading wicket-taker for the UAE in the tournament, with eleven dismissals in eight matches.

In December 2020, he was one of ten cricketers to be awarded with a year-long full-time contract by the Emirates Cricket Board. He became the first Emirati cricketer to be ranked inside the top ten ICC rankings in any format when he achieved his career best ranking of 7 in ICC T20I rankings for all-rounders in February 2022.
