= United Arab Emirates national cricket team =

Cricket team that represents the United Arab Emirates

United Arab Emirates
- Association: Emirates Cricket Board

Personnel
- One Day captain: Harpreet Singh Bhatia
- T20I captain: Muhammad Waseem
- Coach: Lalchand Rajput

International Cricket Council
- ICC status: Associate member (1990); Affiliate member (1989)
- ICC region: Asia
ICC Rankings	Current	Best-ever
ODI	20th	13th (02 May 2022)
T20I	15th	11th (21 Oct 2019)

One Day Internationals
- First ODI: v. India at Sharjah Cricket Stadium, Sharjah; 13 April 1994
- Last ODI: v. Nepal at UDST Cricket Ground, Doha; 22 November 2026
ODIs	Played	Won/Lost
Total	145	49/94 (1 tie, 1 no result)
This year	17	7/9 (0 ties, 1 no result)
- World Cup appearances: 2 (first in 1996)
- Best result: Group stage (1996, 2015)
- World Cup Qualifier appearances: 7 (first in 1994)
- Best result: Champions (1994)

T20 Internationals
- First T20I: v. Netherlands at Sylhet International Cricket Stadium, Sylhet; 17 March 2014
- Last T20I: v. Malaysia at Bayuemas Oval, Kuala Lumpur; 17 September 2026
T20Is	Played	Won/Lost
Total	152	82/69 (0 ties, 1 no result)
This year	11	5/6 (0 ties, 0 no results)
- T20 World Cup appearances: 3 (first in 2014)
- Best result: First round (2014, 2022)
- T20 World Cup Qualifier appearances: 7 (Note: For the 2024 and 2026 Men's T20 World Cups, the final round of qualification in Asia was the ICC Asia Regional Final.) (first in 2010)
- Best result: Champions (2022)
- Official website: ECB
ODI & T20I kit
- As of 22 November 2026

The United Arab Emirates men's national cricket team represents the United Arab Emirates in international cricket. They are governed by the Emirates Cricket Board (ECB) which became an Affiliate Member of the International Cricket Council (ICC) in 1989 and an Associate Member the following year. Since 2005, the ICC's headquarters have been located in Dubai.

One of the emerging One Day International (ODI) teams, the UAE won the ACC Trophy on four consecutive occasions between 2000 and 2006, and were runners-up in the tournament on three occasions, in 1996, 1998 and 2008. They won the ICC Trophy in 1994, and played their first ODIs that year, later playing in the 1996 Cricket World Cup. Other ODI matches came in the 2004 and 2008 Asia Cups. At the 2014 World Cup Qualifier, the UAE finished in the second place behind Scotland, qualifying for the 2015 World Cup and gaining ODI status until 2018.

The UAE made the group stage of the 2014 ICC World Twenty20 and 2022 ICC Men's T20 World Cup. The team qualified for the 2019 ICC T20 World Cup Qualifier as hosts. Following the demise of the World Cricket League (WCL), UAE played in the 2019–22 ICC Cricket World Cup League 2.

== History ==
=== Early days ===
In 1892, cricket was introduced by the British Army in what is now the UAE, but was then known as the "Trucial States". The game spread during World War II, as personnel from the British Royal Air Force and other Commonwealth forces (which included first-class and club cricketers from Australia and New Zealand) stationed in cities such as Ajman, Al Ain, Dubai and Sharjah, continued their favourite pastime. The pitches installed by them around the air base in Sharjah were used by British and other foreign nationals after the war ended.

Sharjah residents began playing the Dubai residents in the local derbies which were held in Dubai. The Garden city of Al Ain has the oldest cricket council in the whole of the UAE. The popularity of the game declined after independence in 1971; however, when South Asians began settling in the country, they brought with them a wish to play cricket. The local Arab population, educated in India and Pakistan, set up clubs and domestic tournaments began in the 1980s.

=== Making of the national side ===
The first match was played by the UAE national side in February 1976 against Pakistan International Airlines in Sharjah. The visitors scored 345/5 from their 50 overs and the UAE were on 88/4 from 28 overs when the game was abandoned due to rain.

Wealthy locals began investing in the sport and an International standard cricket ground was constructed in Sharjah. The Sharjah Cricket Association Stadium hosted its first international event in 1984 when India, Pakistan and Sri Lanka contested the Asia Cup. The venue has gone on to host almost 200 ODIs and four Test matches, the Test matches having been held there due to security concerns in Pakistan following the 2009 attack on the Sri Lanka national cricket team in March 2009, in Lahore.

The Emirates Cricket Board (ECB) was established in 1989 and gained affiliate membership of the ICC the same year. They were quickly promoted to associate member status the following year. Also in 1990, the national side returned to action, twice losing heavily to the Netherlands. These heavy defeats showed that much work needed to be done if the UAE were to be successful in the 1994 ICC Trophy and the ECB adopted a controversial policy.

=== 1994 ICC Trophy ===
Hoping to form a successful national side in time for the tournament in Kenya, the ECB attracted several players with first-class experience in India, Pakistan and Sri Lanka to take up employment in the country so that they could satisfy the residential requirements to represent the UAE in the tournament.

With just one native Arab selected in the shape of Sultan Zarawani, who captained the side, the UAE won the trophy and thus qualified for the 1996 World Cup. The UAE had beaten Kenya in the final, and the Kenyan players and cricket board were very vocal in their anger at being defeated by what they and other observers described as a team of imported mercenaries.

Whilst the ICC remained relatively silent on the controversy, the national team eligibility requirements were strongly tightened for all future ICC sanctioned tournaments.

=== First ODIs ===
The UAE played their first ODIs in 1994 in the triangular Austral-Asia Cup with Pakistan and India, which the UAE also hosted. They finished last in a tri-series against Kenya and the Netherlands the same year and also finished last in a tournament against the A sides of India, Pakistan and Sri Lanka in 1995. They returned to ODI cricket in the 1996 World Cup where they lost all matches except the one against the Netherlands, which was the first ever ODI between two associate members of the ICC.

Later in 1996 the UAE were runners-up to Bangladesh in the first ACC Trophy. The tightened eligibility rules meant that they were unable to repeat their 1994 success when they finished tenth in the 1997 ICC Trophy in Malaysia. They were beaten by Bangladesh in the semi-finals of the 1998 ACC Trophy.

=== 21st century ===
==== 2000 – 2009 ====
With Bangladesh being promoted to ICC full membership, the UAE began to establish themselves as the top associate side in Asia, though they often fell short against the top associates in Europe and North America, a position that remains to this day. They won the ACC Trophy in 2000 and 2002, beating Hong Kong and Nepal in the respective finals, but finished fifth in the 2001 ICC Trophy in Canada.

UAE hosted the 2004 ICC Six Nations Challenge and finished fifth, level on points with four other teams. The year was a busy one for the UAE cricketers as they played the first Intercontinental Cup match against Nepal, with Ali Asad taking nine wickets in the first innings. They beat Malaysia later in the tournament but lost to Canada in the semi-finals. They won the ACC Trophy again that year, beating Oman in the final. They returned to ODI cricket, losing to India and Sri Lanka in the first round of the Asia Cup, and finished fourth in the Hong Kong Sixes, beating India and South Africa on the way.

They reached the semi-finals of the ICC Intercontinental Cup again in 2005, also playing a series against England A at Sharjah, losing all four matches. The 2005 ICC Trophy in Ireland saw them finish sixth. They beat Hong Kong in the final of the 2006 ACC Trophy, but began their 2006 ICC Intercontinental Cup campaign with an innings defeat by Namibia. The campaign continued with a draw against Scotland and a defeat by Ireland, again by an innings. They finished fourth in the first ACC Twenty20 Cup in 2007.

Their campaign in the 2007–2008 ICC Intercontinental Cup was unsuccessful, with just one win against Bermuda in their seven matches. The team fared better in Division Two of the World Cricket League in Windhoek in 2007, winning the tournament after beating Oman in the final.

They again played in the Asia Cup in 2008, losing to Bangladesh and Sri Lanka in the first round. Their 2008 ACC Trophy Elite began with a shock defeat to Saudi Arabia, their first ACC Trophy defeat since the 1998 semi-final. They lost to Hong Kong in the final, ending a run of four consecutive titles.

The UAE hosted and were runners-up at the 2009 ACC Twenty20 Cup, losing the final to Afghanistan, after winning four group matches and accounting for Oman in their semi-final.

==== 2010 – present ====
In October 2010, the team announced that it had hired Kabir Khan to become its coach. Khan had great success with the Afghan team during his one-year stint as they became eligible to play ODIs. Kabir Khan also stated that his aim was to help UAE qualify for the 2012 ICC World Twenty20.

In April 2011, the UAE hosted and won Division Two of the World Cricket League without losing a match. In June/July 2011, they played Kenya at Nairobi for the first round of 2011–13 ICC Intercontinental Cup. In December, the UAE participated in the 2011 ACC Twenty20 Cup in Nepal. Then in 2013, they traveled to Scotland to compete in the 2013 Cricket World Cup Qualifier, the final event of the 2009–13 World Cricket League.

UAE finished third in the 2013 ACC Twenty20 Cup which after defeating Hong Kong in the play-off for third place. In November, they hosted 2013 ICC World Twenty20 Qualifier and finished fourth after losing to Nepal in the play-off for third place, and qualified for the 2014 ICC World Twenty20, defeating the Netherlands by 10 runs in the quarter-final.

UAE participated in the 2014 ICC World Twenty20 but were unsuccessful in the tournament, going without a win. UAE finished second in the 2014 ACC Premier League and qualified for the 2014 ACC Championship. They also qualified for 2015 Cricket World Cup in Australia and New Zealand.

UAE qualified to play in the Cricket World Cup after a lapse of almost twenty years. Unlike other teams in the tournament, the squad of players mainly consisted of semi-professionals. The team registered their highest ODI total ever at the 2015 Cricket World Cup in a group stage match played against Zimbabwe in Nelson, New Zealand. However, they failed to register a win and were eliminated from the 2015 Cricket World Cup with 6 losses out of 6 matches in Pool B. They returned to T20 cricket in the 2022 World Cup where they lost all matches except the one against Namibia, which was the first ever T20 between two associate members of the ICC.

New Zealand toured UAE in August 2023 for a three match T20I series. In the second T20I, UAE pulled off a stunning upset, defeating New Zealand by 7 wickets. It was UAE's first international win over New Zealand and also New Zealand's first defeat against an associate team.

19 August 2023
18:00 (N)
Scorecard

New Zealand; 142/8 (20 overs)	v	United Arab Emirates; 144/3 (15.4 overs)
Mark Chapman 63 (46); Aayan Afzal Khan 3/20 (4 overs)		Muhammad Waseem 55 (29); Mitchell Santner 1/26 (3 overs)

United Arab Emirates won by 7 wickets
Dubai International Cricket Stadium, Dubai
Umpires: Aasif Iqbal (UAE) and Shiju Sam (UAE)
Player of the match: Aayan Afzal Khan (UAE)

- United Arab Emirates won the toss and elected to field.
- This was United Arab Emirates's maiden victory against New Zealand in any format of cricket.

== International grounds ==
Venue	City	Map
Dubai International Cricket Stadium	Dubai	Locations of all stadiums which have hosted an international cricket match within UAE
Sharjah Cricket Stadium	Sharjah	Locations of all stadiums which have hosted an international cricket match within UAE
Sheikh Zayed Cricket Stadium	Abu Dhabi	Locations of all stadiums which have hosted an international cricket match within UAE
ICC Academy Ground	Dubai	Locations of all stadiums which have hosted an international cricket match within UAE

=== Infrastructure ===
In terms of infrastructure, the UAE have the best stadiums as compared to other Associate members: Sheikh Zayed Cricket Stadium in Abu Dhabi; DSC Cricket Stadium, Dubai and Sharjah Cricket Association Stadium, Sharjah, which has hosted around 200 ODIs and Test matches.

International stadiums in Ajman and Al Ain are currently under development.

The following are the main cricket stadiums in UAE:

- Sharjah Cricket Stadium, Sharjah
- Dubai International Cricket Stadium, Dubai
- Sheikh Zayed Cricket Stadium, Abu Dhabi
- Dubai Cricket Council Ground No 1, Dubai
- Dubai Cricket Council Ground No 2, Dubai
- ICC Global Cricket Academy 1, Dubai
- ICC Global Cricket Academy 2, Dubai
- Ajman International Cricket Stadium, Ajman
- Al Ain International Cricket Stadium, Al Ain

== Tournament history ==
Legend

- Champions
- Runners-up
- Third place/Semi-finals
- Hosts
- Q Qualified/Advanced to next stage
- DNQ Did not qualify
- ▲ Promoted
- Remained in the same division
- ▼ Relegated

=== Cricket World Cup ===
Cricket World Cup record								Qualification record				
Year	Round	Position	Pld	W	L	T	NR	Pld	W	L	T	NR
(England) 1975	Not an ICC member							Not an ICC member				
(England) 1979	Not an ICC member							Not an ICC member				
(England) (Wales) 1983	Not an ICC member							Not an ICC member				
(India) (Pakistan) 1987	Not an ICC member							Not an ICC member				
(Australia) (New Zealand) 1992	Not eligible; ICC affiliate member							Not eligible; ICC affiliate member				
(India) (Pakistan) (Sri Lanka) 1996	Group stage	11/12	5	1	4	0	0	9	9	0	0	0
(England) (Wales) (Scotland) (Republic of Ireland) (Netherlands) 1999	Did not qualify							7	5	2	0	0
(South Africa) (Zimbabwe) (Kenya) 2003	Did not qualify							10	6	4	0	0
(Cricket West Indies) 2007	Did not qualify							13	9	3	0	1
(India) (Sri Lanka) (Bangladesh) 2011	Did not qualify							15	10	5	0	0
(Australia) (New Zealand) 2015	Group Stage	13/14	6	0	6	0	0	28	21	7	0	0
(England) (Wales) 2019	Did not qualify							27	12	15	0	0
(India) 2023	Did not qualify							47	20	24	1	2
(South Africa) (Zimbabwe) (Namibia) 2027	To be determined							28*	8	18	0	2
Total	0 Titles	2/13	11	1	10	0	0	184	100	78	1	5

=== Cricket World Cup Qualifier ===
Cricket World Cup Qualifier record
Year	Round	Position	Pld	W	L	T	NR	Qual.
(Sri Lanka) 1979	Not an ICC member							
(England) 1982	Not an ICC member							
(England) 1986	Not an ICC member							
(Netherlands) 1990	Not eligible; ICC affiliate member							
(Kenya) 1994	Winners	1/20	9	9	0	0	0	Q
(Malaysia) 1997	Play-offs	10/22	7	5	2	0	0	DNQ
(Canada) 2001	Super League	5/24	10	6	4	0	0	DNQ
(Ireland) 2005	Play-offs	6/12	7	3	3	0	1	DNQ
(South Africa) 2009	Play-offs	7/12	10	6	4	0	0	DNQ
(New Zealand) 2014	Runners-up	10/22	8	6	2	0	0	Q
(Zimbabwe) 2018	Super Six	6/10	7	3	4	0	0	DNQ
(Zimbabwe) 2023	Play-offs	9/10	6	1	5	0	0	DNQ
2027	To be determined							
Total	1 Title	9/13	64	39	24	0	1	—N/a

=== Men's T20 World Cup ===
Men's T20 World Cup record								Qualification record				
Year	Round	Position	Pld	W	L	T	NR	Pld	W	L	T	NR
(South Africa) 2007	Not eligilble							Not eligilble				
(England) 2009	Not eligilble							Not eligilble				
(Cricket West Indies) 2010	Did not qualify							5	3	2	0	0
(Sri Lanka) 2012	Did not qualify							5	4	1	0	0
(Bangladesh) 2014	First round	16/16	3	0	3	0	0	16	11	5	0	0
(India) 2016	Did not qualify							6	1	4	0	1
(United Arab Emirates) (Oman) 2021	Did not qualify							13	9	4	0	0
(Australia) 2022	Group Stage	16/16	3	1	2	0	0	5	4	1	0	0
(United States) (Cricket West Indies) 2024	Did not qualify							4	3	1	0	0
(India) (Sri Lanka) 2026	Group Stage	16/20	4	1	3	0	0	12	10	2	0	0
(Australia) (New Zealand) 2028	To be determined							To be determined				
Total	0 Titles	3/10	10	2	8	0	0	66	45	20	0	1

=== T20 World Cup Qualifier ===
Men's T20 World Cup Qualifier record
Year	Round	Position	Pld	W	L	T	NR	Qual.
(Ireland) 2008	Not eligible							
(United Arab Emirates) 2010	Super Four	3/8	5	3	2	0	0	DNQ
(United Arab Emirates) 2012	Did not qualify							
(United Arab Emirates) 2013	Fourth place	4/16	10	6	4	0	0	Q
(Ireland) (Scotland) 2015	Group stage	13/14	6	1	4	0	1	DNQ
(United Arab Emirates) 2019	Play-offs	7/14	8	4	4	0	0	DNQ
(Oman) 2022 (A)	Winners	1/8	5	4	1	0	0	Q
(To be determined) 2028	Qualified							
Total	1 Title	6/8	34	18	15	0	1	—N/a

=== Asia Cup ===
Asia Cup record
Year	Round	Position	Pld	W	L	T	NR
(United Arab Emirates) 1984	Not an ACC member						
(Sri Lanka) 1986	Not an ACC member						
(Bangladesh) 1988	Not an ACC member						
(India) 1990	No qualification						
(United Arab Emirates) 1995	No qualification						
(Sri Lanka) 1997	No qualification						
(Bangladesh) 2000	No qualification						
(Sri Lanka) 2004	Group Stage	6/6	2	0	2	0	0
(Pakistan) 2008	Group Stage	6/6	2	0	2	0	0
(Sri Lanka) 2010	No qualification						
(Bangladesh) 2012	No qualification						
(Bangladesh) 2014	No qualification						
(Bangladesh) 2016	Group Stage	5/5	4	0	4	0	0
(United Arab Emirates) 2018	Did not qualify						
(United Arab Emirates) 2022	Did not qualify						
(Pakistan) (Sri Lanka) 2023	Did not qualify						
(United Arab Emirates) 2025	Group Stage	6/8	3	1	2	0	0
Total	0 Titles	4/17	11	1	10	0	0

=== Other global tournaments ===
CWC League 2 (ODI)	CWC Qualifier Play-off (ODI)	World Cricket League (LA/OD/ODI)	Intercontinental Cup (FC)
2019–23: 6th place; 2024–26: In progress	2023: Runners-up	2007 (Division Two): Winners; 2011 (Division Two): Winners; 2011–13 (Championship): 3rd place; 2018 (Division Two): Winners	2004: Semi-finals; 2005: Semi-finals; 2006: First round; 2009–10 (Shield): Runners-up; 2011–13: 4th place

=== Other regional tournaments ===
T20WC Asia/Asia-EAP Regional Final (T20I)	T20WC Asia Sub-regional Qualifier (T20I)	ACC Premier Cup/Asia Cup Qualifier (OD/T20I)	ACC Trophy (OD)
2019: Advanced directly; 2023: 3rd place (DNQ); 2025: 3rd place (Q)	2018: Winners (Q); 2021: Advanced directly; 2023: Advanced directly; 2024: Winners (Q)	2016: Winners (Q); 2018: Runner up (DNQ); 2022: Runner up (DNQ); 2023: Runners-up (DNQ); 2024: Winners (Q); 2026 : Qualified	1996 to 1998: Not eligible; 2000: Winners; 2002: Winners; 2004: Winners; 2006: Winners; 2008 (Elite): Runners-up; 2010 (Elite): 6th place; 2012 (Elite): Winners
ACC Twenty20 Cup (T20)	ACC Premier League (OD)	Fast Track Countries Tournament	Gulf Championship (T20I)
2007: 4th place; 2009: Runners-up; 2011: 5th place; 2013: 3rd place; 2015: Did not participate	2014: Runners-up	2004: Runners-up; 2005: Winners; 2006: Runners-up	2023: Runners-up; 2024: Winners

== Current squad ==
Updated as of 4 September 2025

This lists all the active players who were part of the UAE squad for 2025 Asia Cup's T20I or latest ODI squad. Uncapped players are listed in italics.

Note: Forms column refers to the formats the player has played for the UAE in the latest ODI/T20I squad, not over their whole career

Name	Age	Batting style	Bowling style	Forms	Last ODI	Last T20I	Notes
Batters
Muhammad Waseem	32	Right-handed	Right-arm medium	ODI, T20I	(Nepal) 2025	(South Africa) 2026	T20I Captain
Alishan Sharafu	23	Right-handed	Right-arm medium	ODI, T20I	(Nepal) 2025	(South Africa) 2026	
Harpreet Singh Bhatia	35	Left-handed	Right-arm medium	ODI, T20I	(Nepal) 2026	(Nepal) 2026	ODI Captain
Sohaib Khan	28	Right-handed	—N/a	ODI, T20I	(Netherlands) 2025	(Afghanistan) 2026	
Akshdeep Nath	28	Right-handed	Right-arm medium	ODI, T20I	(Oman) 2026	(Nepal) 2026	
Ethan D'Souza	20	Left-handed	Right-arm off break	T20I	(United States) 2023	(Oman) 2025	
Asif Khan	36	Right-handed	Right-arm off break	ODI, T20I	(Scotland) 2025	(Pakistan) 2025	
Muhammad Zohaib	36	Left-handed	Right-arm off break	T20I	—N/a	(Ireland) 2026	
Sagar Kalyan	30	Left-handed	Right-arm medium	ODI	(Netherlands) 2025	—N/a	
All-rounders
Muhammad Farooq	34	Right-handed	Leg break	ODI, T20I	(Oman) 2024	(South Africa) 2026	
Harshit Kaushik	30	Left-handed	Slow left-arm orthodox	T20I	(Nepal) 2025	(Afghanistan) 2026	
Dhruv Parashar	21	Right-handed	Right-arm off break	ODI, T20I	(Nepal) 2025	(South Africa) 2026	
Aayan Afzal Khan	21	Right-handed	Slow left-arm orthodox	ODI	(Scotland) 2025	(Oman) 2025	
Wicket-keepers
Rahul Chopra	32	Right-handed	—N/a	ODI, T20I	(Nepal) 2025	(Ireland) 2026	
Aryansh Sharma	21	Right-handed	—N/a	ODI, T20I	(Nepal) 2025	(South Africa) 2026	
Vriitya Aravind	24	Right-handed	—N/a	ODI	(Netherlands) 2025	(Afghanistan) 2024	
Adeeb Usmani	21	Right-handed	Right-arm off break	ODI, T20I	(Nepal) 2026	(Oman) 2026	
Tanish Suri	21	Right-handed	—N/a	ODI	(Scotland) 2025	(Kuwait) 2024	
Syed Haider	25	Right-handed	—N/a	T20I	—N/a	(South Africa) 2026	
Pace bowlers
Muhammad Jawadullah	32	Left-handed	Left-arm fast-medium	ODI, T20I	(Nepal) 2025	(South Africa) 2026	
Matiullah Khan	33	Right-handed	Right-arm medium-fast	T20I	(United States) 2023	(Nigeria) 2025	
Saghir Khan	27	Right-handed	Right-arm medium-fast	T20I	—N/a	(Afghanistan) 2025	
Muhammad Rohid	24	Right-handed	Left-arm medium-fast	T20I	(United States) 2025	(New Zealand) 2026	
Junaid Siddique	33	Right-handed	Right-arm medium-fast	ODI, T20I	(Scotland) 2025	(South Africa) 2026	
Zahid Ali	34	Right-handed	Right-arm medium	ODI	(Nepal) 2025	(Oman) 2025	
Sanchit Sharma	25	Right-handed	Right-arm medium	ODI	(Scotland) 2025	(Bangladesh) 2025	
Khuzaima Tanveer	26	Right-handed	Right-arm fast	ODI, T20I	(Nepal) 2026	(Nepal) 2026	
Spin bowlers
Haider Ali	32	Left-handed	Slow left-arm orthodox	T20I	(Nepal) 2025	(South Africa) 2026	
Zuhaib Zubair	22	Right-handed	Right-arm Leg break	ODI, T20I	(Nepal) 2026	(Nepal) 2026	
Muhammad Farooq	34	Right-handed	Right-arm Leg break	ODI, T20I	(Oman) 2024	(Canada) 2026	
Simranjeet Singh	37	Right-handed	Slow left-arm orthodox	ODI, T20I	(United States) 2025	(Afghanistan) 2026	

== Coaching staff ==
Position	Name
Coach	Lalchand Rajput
Assistant coach	Mohammad Naveed
Analyst	Mohammad Tauqir
Strength and conditioning coach	Amjad Javed
Physiotherapist	Sultan Ahmed
Physiotherapist	Amir Hayat
Fielding coach	Stanley Chioza

== Records and statistics ==
International match summary – United Arab Emirates

Playing Record
Format	M	W	L	T	NR	Inaugural match
One-Day Internationals	145	49	94	1	1	13 April 1994
Twenty20 Internationals	152	82	69	0	1	17 March 2014

Last updated 22 November 2026.

=== One-Day Internationals ===
- Highest team total: 348/3 v. Namibia on 12 March 2022 at Sharjah Cricket Stadium, Sharjah
- Highest individual score: 151*, Asif Khan v. United States on 6 July 2023 at Takashinga Cricket Club, Harare
- Best individual bowling figures: 6/34, Zahoor Khan v. Ireland on 2 March 2017 at ICC Academy 1, Dubai

Most ODI runs for the United Arab Emirates

Player	Runs	Average	Career span
Vriitya Aravind	1,865	31.08	2019–2025
Muhammad Waseem	1,855	25.41	2022–2026
Rohan Mustafa	1,504	21.48	2014–2023
Asif Khan	1,270	38.48	2022–2025
Shaiman Anwar	1,219	31.25	2014–2019

Most ODI wickets for the United Arab Emirates

Player	Wickets	Average	Career span
Junaid Siddique	100	28.24	2019–2026
Zahoor Khan	93	25.86	2017–2024
Rohan Mustafa	85	33.29	2014–2023
Ahmed Raza	64	30.06	2014–2022
Aayan Afzal Khan	63	27.22	2022–2026

ODI record versus other nations

Opponent	M	W	L	T	NR	First match	First win
v. Test nations
Afghanistan	6	3	3	0	0	2 May 2014	28 November 2014
Bangladesh	1	0	1	0	0	24 June 2008	
England	1	0	1	0	0	18 February 1996	
India	3	0	3	0	0	13 April 1994	
Ireland	9	1	8	0	0	25 February 2015	8 January 2021
New Zealand	1	0	1	0	0	27 February 1996	
Pakistan	3	0	3	0	0	17 April 1994	
South Africa	2	0	2	0	0	16 February 1996	
Sri Lanka	3	0	3	0	0	17 July 2004	
West Indies	5	0	5	0	0	15 March 2015	
Zimbabwe	6	1	5	0	0	19 February 2015	22 March 2018
v. Associate Members
Canada	4	2	2	0	0	1 April 2023	1 April 2023
Hong Kong	4	2	2	0	0	4 May 2014	4 May 2014
Jersey	1	1	0	0	0	5 April 2023	5 April 2023
Namibia	11	7	3	0	1	6 January 2020	6 January 2020
Nepal	21	8	13	0	0	30 August 2018	30 August 2018
Netherlands	7	3	4	0	0	1 March 1996	1 March 1996
Oman	15	8	6	1	0	5 January 2020	5 February 2022
Papua New Guinea	11	6	5	0	0	31 March 2017	31 March 2017
Scotland	18	5	13	0	0	1 February 2014	24 January 2017
United States	13	2	11	0	0	8 December 2019	4 June 2022

Records complete to ODI #5067. Last updated 22 November 2026.

=== Twenty20 Internationals ===
- Highest team total: 245/2 v. Namibia on 29 September 2024 at Wanderers Cricket Ground, Windhoek
- Highest individual score: 117*, Shaiman Anwar v. Papua New Guinea on 14 April 2017 at Sheikh Zayed Stadium, Abu Dhabi
- Best individual bowling figures: 5/19, Ahmed Raza v. Nepal on 22 February 2022 at Oman Cricket Academy Ground Turf 1, Muscat

Most T20I runs for the United Arab Emirates

Player	Runs	Average	Career span
Muhammad Waseem	3,338	36.68	2021–2026
Alishan Sharafu	1,816	32.42	2020–2026
Asif Khan	1,302	28.30	2023–2025
Vriitya Aravind	1,052	27.68	2020–2024
Rohan Mustafa	1,006	20.95	2014–2023

Most T20I wickets for the United Arab Emirates

Player	Wickets	Average	Career span
Junaid Siddique	124	20.51	2019–2026
Zahoor Khan	72	19.52	2017–2023
Rohan Mustafa	61	21.03	2014–2023
Muhammad Jawadullah	60	19.93	2020–2026
Ali Naseer	51	20.03	2023–2024

T20I record versus other nations

Opponent	M	W	L	T	NR	First match	First win
v. Test nations
Afghanistan	15	3	12	0	0	10 July 2015	19 February 2016
Australia	1	0	1	0	0	22 October 2018	
Bangladesh	6	2	4	0	0	26 February 2016	19 May 2025
India	2	0	2	0	0	3 March 2016	
Ireland	13	7	6	0	0	19 March 2014	16 February 2016
New Zealand	4	1	3	0	0	17 August 2023	19 August 2023
Pakistan	4	0	4	0	0	29 February 2016	
South Africa	1	0	1	0	0	18 February 2026	
Sri Lanka	2	0	2	0	0	25 February 2016	
Zimbabwe	1	0	1	0	0	21 March 2014	
v. Associate Members
Bahrain	6	4	2	0	0	21 February 2022	30 October 2023
Bhutan	1	1	0	0	0	19 November 2024	19 November 2024
Cambodia	2	2	0	0	0	17 April 2024	17 April 2024
Canada	2	2	0	0	0	27 October 2019	27 October 2019
Germany	1	1	0	0	0	19 February 2022	19 February 2022
Hong Kong	6	4	2	0	0	21 February 2016	21 February 2016
Iran	1	1	0	0	0	23 February 2020	23 February 2020
Japan	1	1	0	0	0	16 October 2025	16 October 2025
Jersey	1	0	1	0	0	22 October 2019	
Kenya	2	2	0	0	0	18 July 2025	18 July 2025
Kuwait	8	7	1	0	0	24 February 2020	24 February 2020
Malaysia	4	4	0	0	0	10 October 2025	10 October 2025
Namibia	4	3	1	0	0	5 October 2021	20 October 2022
Nepal	13	6	7	0	0	31 January 2019	31 January 2019
Netherlands	9	4	5	0	0	17 March 2014	3 August 2019
Nigeria	3	3	0	0	0	24 October 2019	24 October 2019
Oman	12	6	6	0	0	22 November 2015	22 November 2015
Papua New Guinea	3	3	0	0	0	12 April 2017	12 April 2017
Qatar	5	5	0	0	0	26 February 2020	26 February 2020
Samoa	1	1	0	0	0	15 October 2025	15 October 2025
Saudi Arabia	4	3	1	0	0	25 February 2020	25 February 2020
Scotland	6	2	4	0	0	9 July 2015	4 February 2016
Singapore	1	1	0	0	0	22 August 2022	22 August 2022
Thailand	1	1	0	0	0	23 November 2024	23 November 2024
Uganda	2	0	2	0	0	19 July 2025	
United States	4	2	1	0	1	15 March 2019	16 March 2019

Records complete to T20I #4125. Last updated 17 September 2026.

== Other First-class Records ==
=== ICC Trophy ===
- Highest team total: 330/9 v. Bermuda, 27 February 1994 at Nairobi Club Ground
- Highest individual score: 126 not out by Azhar Saeed, 25 February 1994 at Aga Khan Sports Club Ground, Nairobi
- Best innings bowling: 5/32 by Ahmed Nadeem v. USA, 1 July 2005 at The Meadow, Downpatrick

=== Overall ===
- Highest team total: 459/4 v. Brunei, 14 August 2006 at Kinrara Academy Oval, Kuala Lumpur
- Highest individual score: 213 not out by Arshad Ali v. Brunei, 14 August 2006 at Kinrara Academy Oval, Kuala Lumpur
- Best innings bowling: 9/74 by Ali Asad v. Nepal, 25 March 2004 at Sharjah Cricket Association Stadium

== World records ==
- Khurram Khan is the oldest player to score an ODI century as well as the oldest player to score his maiden ODI century (at the age of 43 years and 162 days).

== See also ==
- List of United Arab Emirates ODI cricketers
- List of United Arab Emirates Twenty20 International cricketers
- United Arab Emirates national women's cricket team
