= United Arab Emirates at the Men's T20 World Cup =

United Arab Emirates national team performance at T20 World Cup

The United Arab Emirates national cricket team is one of the associate members of the International Cricket Council (ICC). United Arab Emirates qualified for their first T20 World Cup in 2014 after finishing 4th in the 2013 Qualifier, they did not make a reappearance in the tournament till 2022 edition. In both the editions that they participated in, the team finished last. UAE hosted the 2021 tournament alongside Oman, with Board of Control for Cricket in India as the hosting body.

== T20 World Cup record ==
Men's T20 World Cup record										Qualification record (Note: WCL Division One served as the qualifier for the 2007 edition.)				
Year	Round	Position	Pld	W	L	T	NR	Ab (Note: Abandoned matches are not counted in the official records.)	Captain	Pld	W	L	T	NR
(South Africa) 2007	Not eligilble									Not eligilble				
(England) 2009	Not eligilble									Not eligilble				
(Cricket West Indies) 2010	Did not qualify									6	4	2	0	0
(Sri Lanka) 2012	Did not qualify									5	4	1	0	0
(Bangladesh) 2014	First stage	16/16	3	0	3	0	0	0	Khurram Khan	16	11	5	0	0
(India) 2016	Did not qualify									6	1	4	0	1
(United Arab Emirates) (Oman) 2021	Did not qualify									12	9	3	0	0
(Australia) 2022	First round	16/16	3	1	2	0	0	0	Chundangapoyil Rizwan	5	4	1	0	0
(United States) (Cricket West Indies) 2024	Did not qualify									4	3	1	0	0
(India) (Sri Lanka) 2026	Group stage	17/20	4	1	3	0	0	0	Muhammad Waseem	12	10	2	0	0
Total	0 Titles	3/10	10	2	8	0	0	0	—N/a	66	45	20	0	1

=== Record by opponents ===
Opponent	M	W	L	T+W	T+L	NR	Ab	Win %	First played
Afghanistan	1	0	1	0	0	0	0	0.00	2026
Canada	1	1	0	0	0	0	0	100	2026
Ireland	1	0	1	0	0	0	0	0.00	2014
Namibia	1	1	0	0	0	0	0	100	2022
Netherlands	2	0	2	0	0	0	0	0.00	2014
New Zealand	1	0	1	0	0	0	0	0.00	2026
South Africa	1	0	1	0	0	0	0	0.00	2026
Sri Lanka	1	0	1	0	0	0	0	0.00	2022
Zimbabwe	1	0	1	0	0	0	0	0.00	2014
Total	10	2	8	0	0	0	0	20.00	—N/a
Source: Last Updated: 8 March 2026

== Tournament results ==
=== Bangladesh 2014 ===
Squad and kit

- Khurram Khan (c)
- Amjad Ali
- Faizan Asif
- Swapnil Patil (wk)
- Rohan Mustafa
- Shaiman Anwar
- Vikrant Shetty
- Amjad Javed
- Ahmed Raza
- Manjula Guruge
- Kamran Shazad
- Sharif Asadullah
- Shadeep Silva
- Moaaz Qazi
- Rohit Singh

2014 kit

Results

First stage (Group B)				Super 10		Semifinal	Final	Overall Result
Opposition Result	Opposition Result	Opposition Result	Rank	Opposition Result	Rank	Opposition Result	Opposition Result	Overall Result
Netherlands; L by 6 wickets	Ireland; L by 21 runs (DLS)	Zimbabwe; L by 5 wickets	4	Did not advance				First stage
Source: Cricinfo

Scorecards

First stage (Group B)

17 March
Scorecard

United Arab Emirates; 151 (19.5 overs)	v	Netherlands; 152/4 (18.5 overs)
Shaiman Anwar 32 (19); Ahsan Malik 3/16 (3.5 overs)		Stephan Myburgh 55 (36); Kamran Shazad 2/19 (4 overs)

Netherlands won by 6 wickets
Sylhet International Cricket Stadium, Sylhet

19 March
Scorecard

United Arab Emirates; 123/6 (20 overs)	v	Ireland; 103/3 (14.2 overs)
Shaiman Anwar 30 (28); Paul Stirling 2/12 (3 overs)		Ed Joyce 43 (38); Sharif Asadullah 2/21 (3 overs)

Ireland won by 21 runs (D/L method)
Sylhet International Cricket Stadium, Sylhet

21 March
Scorecard

United Arab Emirates; 116/9 (20 overs)	v	Zimbabwe; 118/5 (13.4 overs)
Swapnil Patil 30 (26); Sean Williams 3/15 (4 overs)		Elton Chigumbura 53 (21); Manjula Guruge 2/18 (4 overs)

Zimbabwe won by 5 wickets
Sylhet International Cricket Stadium, Sylhet

=== Australia 2022 ===
Squad and kit

- Chundangapoyil Rizwan (c)
- Vriitya Aravind (vc) (wk)
- Chirag Suri
- Muhammad Waseem
- Basil Hameed
- Aryan Lakra
- Kashif Daud
- Karthik Meiyappan
- Fahad Nawaz
- Ahmed Raza
- Zahoor Khan
- Junaid Siddique
- Sabir Ali
- Alishan Sharafu
- Aayan Afzal Khan

2022 kit

Results

First round (Group A)				Super 12		Semifinal	Final	Overall Result
Opposition Result	Opposition Result	Opposition Result	Rank	Opposition Result	Rank	Opposition Result	Opposition Result	Overall Result
Netherlands; L by 3 wickets	Sri Lanka; L by 79 runs	Namibia; W by 7 runs	4	Did not advance				First round
Source: Cricinfo

Scorecards

First round (Group A)

16 October 2022
19:00 (N)
Scorecard

United Arab Emirates; 111/8 (20 overs)	v	Netherlands; 112/7 (19.5 overs)
Muhammad Waseem 41 (47); Bas de Leede 3/19 (3 overs)		Max O'Dowd 23 (18); Junaid Siddique 3/24 (4 overs)

Netherlands won by 3 wickets
Kardinia Park, Geelong
Umpires: Richard Kettleborough (Eng) and Paul Reiffel (Aus)
Player of the match: Bas de Leede (Ned)

- United Arab Emirates won the toss and elected to bat.

18 October 2022
19:00 (N)
Scorecard

Sri Lanka; 152/8 (20 overs)	v	United Arab Emirates; 73 (17.1 overs)
Pathum Nissanka 74 (60); Karthik Meiyappan 3/19 (4 overs)		Aayan Afzal Khan 19 (21); Wanindu Hasaranga 3/8 (4 overs)

Sri Lanka won by 79 runs
Kardinia Park, Geelong
Attendance: 4,545
Umpires: Marais Erasmus (SA) and Rod Tucker (Aus)
Player of the match: Pathum Nissanka (SL)

- United Arab Emirates won the toss and elected to field.
- Karthik Meiyappan became the first bowler for the United Arab Emirates to take a hat-trick in T20Is.

20 October 2022
19:00 (N)
Scorecard

United Arab Emirates; 148/3 (20 overs)	v	Namibia; 141/8 (20 overs)
Muhammad Waseem 50 (41); Ben Shikongo 1/8 (1 over)		David Wiese 55 (36); Basil Hameed 2/17 (3 overs)

United Arab Emirates won by 7 runs
Kardinia Park, Geelong
Umpires: Richard Illingworth (Eng) and Richard Kettleborough (Eng)
Player of the match: Muhammad Waseem (UAE)

- United Arab Emirates won the toss and elected to bat.
- Fahad Nawaz (UAE) made his T20I debut.
- This was the United Arab Emirates' first-ever win at a T20 World Cup.

=== India & Sri Lanka 2026 ===
Squad and kit

- Muhammad Waseem (c)
- Aryansh Sharma (wk)
- Muhammad Jawadullah
- Alishan Sharafu
- Simranjeet Singh
- Muhammad Zohaib
- Harshit Kaushik
- Dhruv Parashar
- Mayank Kumar
- Sohaib Khan
- Muhammad Rohid
- Muhammad Arfan
- Junaid Siddique
- Haider Ali
- Muhammad Farooq

2026 kit

Results

Group stage (Group D)					Super 8		Semifinal	Final	Overall Result
Opposition Result	Opposition Result	Opposition Result	Opposition Result	Rank	Opposition Result	Rank	Opposition Result	Opposition Result	Overall Result
New Zealand; Lost by 10 wickets	Canada; Won by 5 wickets	Afghanistan; Lost by 5 wickets	South Africa; Lost by 6 wickets	4	Did not advance				Group stage
Source: Cricinfo

Scorecards

Group stage (Group D)

Match 11
10 February 2026
15:00 UTC+5:30 (D/N)
Scorecard

United Arab Emirates; 173/6 (20 overs)	v	New Zealand; 175/0 (15.2 overs)
Muhammad Waseem 66* (45); Matt Henry 2/37 (4 overs)		Tim Seifert 89* (42)

New Zealand won by 10 wickets
M. A. Chidambaram Stadium, Chennai
Attendance: 19,623
Umpires: Paul Reiffel (Aus) and Roland Black (Ire)
Player of the match: Tim Seifert (NZ)

- United Arab Emirates won the toss and elected to bat.
- Muhammad Waseem and Alishan Sharafu's 107-run partnership is the highest for any wicket by the UAE in the T20 World Cup.
- This was the UAE's highest innings total in the T20 World Cup (173).
- Tim Seifert and Finn Allen (NZ) both hit their 100th six in T20Is.
- Tim Seifert and Finn Allen's 175-run partnership was the highest partnership ever in the T20 World Cup.
- This was New Zealand's fourth 10-wicket win in T20Is and the seventh overall in T20 World Cups.

Match 20
13 February 2026
15:00 UTC+5:30 (D/N)
Scorecard

Canada; 150/7 (20 overs)	v	United Arab Emirates; 151/5 (19.4 overs)
Harsh Thaker 50 (41); Junaid Siddique 5/35 (4 overs)		Aryansh Sharma 74* (53); Saad Bin Zafar 3/14 (4 overs)

United Arab Emirates won by 5 wickets
Arun Jaitley Cricket Stadium, New Delhi
Umpires: Adrian Holdstock (SA) and Gazi Sohel (Ban)
Player of the match: Junaid Siddique (UAE)

- Canada won the toss and elected to bat.
- Junaid Siddique (UAE) took his maiden five-wicket haul in T20Is and the 14th overall in T20 World Cups.

Match 28
16 February 2026
11:00 UTC+5:30
Scorecard

United Arab Emirates; 160/9 (20 overs)	v	Afghanistan; 162/5 (19.2 overs)
Sohaib Khan 68 (48); Azmatullah Omarzai 4/15 (4 overs)		Ibrahim Zadran 53 (41); Junaid Siddique 2/23 (3.2 overs)

Afghanistan won by 5 wickets
Arun Jaitley Cricket Stadium, New Delhi
Umpires: Roland Black (Ire) and Leslie Reifer (WI)
Player of the match: Azmatullah Omarzai (Afg)

- Afghanistan won the toss and elected to field.
- Rashid Khan (Afg) took his 700th wicket in the T20 format, the first cricketer to achieve this milestone.
- South Africa qualified for the Super 8 as a result of this match.

Match 34
18 February 2026
11:00 UTC+5:30
Scorecard

United Arab Emirates; 122/6 (20 overs)	v	South Africa; 123/4 (13.2 overs)
Alishan Sharafu 45 (38); Corbin Bosch 3/12 (4 overs)		Dewald Brevis 36 (25); Muhammad Arfan 1/16 (2 overs)

South Africa won by 6 wickets
Arun Jaitley Cricket Stadium, New Delhi
Umpires: Leslie Reifer (WI) and Rod Tucker (Aus)
Player of the match: Corbin Bosch (SA)

- South Africa won the toss and elected to field.

== Records and statistics ==
=== Team records ===
Highest innings totals
Score	Opponent	Venue	Season
173/6 (20 overs)	New Zealand	Chennai	2026
160/9 (20 overs)	Afghanistan	New Delhi	2026
151/5 (19.4 overs)	Canada	New Delhi	2026
151 (19.5 overs)	Netherlands	Sylhet	2014
148/3 (20 overs)	Namibia	Geelong	2022
Last updated: 8 March 2026

=== Most appearances ===
This list comprises the players with the most appearances for the United Arab Emirates at the Men's T20 World Cup. Junaid Siddique and Muhammad Waseem jointly hold the record for the most appearances, having played seven matches each. Waseem also captained the side in four matches, the most by any UAE player at the tournament.

Most matches
Matches	Player	Period
7	Junaid Siddique	2022–2026
7	Muhammad Waseem	2022–2026
5	Alishan Sharafu	2022–2026
4	Haider Ali	2026–2026
4	Muhammad Arfan	2026–2026
4	Aryansh Sharma	2026–2026
4	Sohaib Khan	2026–2026
Last updated: 8 March 2026

=== Batting records ===
Most runs
Runs	Player	Mat	Inn	Avg	100s	50s	Period
195	Muhammad Waseem	7	7	32.50	—N/a	2	2022–2026
149	Alishan Sharafu	5	5	29.80	—N/a	1	2022–2026
132	Sohaib Khan	4	4	33.00	—N/a	2	2026–2026
95	Aryansh Sharma	4	4	31.66	—N/a	1	2026–2026
73	Khurram Khan	3	3	24.33	—N/a	—N/a	2014–2014
Last updated: 8 March 2026

Highest individual innings
Score	Player	Opponent	Venue	Year
74*	Aryansh Sharma	Canada	New Delhi	2026
68	Sohaib Khan	Afghanistan	New Delhi	2026
66*	Muhammad Waseem	New Zealand	Chennai	2026
55	Alishan Sharafu	New Zealand	Chennai	2026
51	Sohaib Khan	Canada	New Delhi	2026
Last updated: 8 March 2026

Most fifties
Fifties	Player	Period
2	Sohaib Khan	2026–2026
2	Muhammad Waseem	2022–2026
1	Aryansh Sharma	2026–2026
1	Alishan Sharafu	2022–2026
Last updated: 8 March 2026

=== Bowling records ===
Most wickets
Wickets	Player	Matches	Avg.	Econ.	4W	5W	Period
11	Junaid Siddique	7	20.27	8.68	0	1	2022–2026
5	Zahoor Khan	3	11.40	4.75	0	0	2022–2022
5	Karthik Meiyappan	3	15.00	6.25	0	0	2022–2022
3	Basil Hameed	3	12.33	7.40	0	0	2022–2022
3	Muhammad Jawadullah	3	25.00	7.50	0	0	2026–2026
3	Muhammad Arfan	4	38.33	8.84	0	0	2026–2026
Last updated: 8 March 2026

Best innings figures
Player	Bowling figures	Opponent	Venue	Year
Junaid Siddique	5/35 (4 overs)	Canada	Delhi	2026
Karthik Meiyappan	3/19 (4 overs)	Sri Lanka	Geelong	2022
Junaid Siddique	3/24 (4 overs)	Netherlands	Geelong	2022
Basil Hameed	2/17 (3 overs)	Namibia	Geelong	2022
Amjad Gul	2/18 (4 overs)	Zimbabwe	Sylhet	2014
Last updated: 8 March 2026

=== Partnership records ===
Highest partnerships by runs
Runs	Players	Opposition	Venue	Season
107 (2nd wicket)	Alishan Sharafu & Muhammad Waseem	v New Zealand	Chennai	2026
84 (5th wicket)	Sohaib Khan & Aryansh Sharma	v Canada	Delhi	2026
84 (3rd wicket)	Sohaib Khan & Alishan Sharafu	v Afghanistan	Delhi	2026
67 (3rd wicket)	Swapnil Patil & Khurram Khan	v Netherlands	Sylhet	2014
58 (3rd wicket)	Swapnil Patil & Khurram Khan	v Zimbabwe	Sylhet	2014
Last updated: 8 March 2026

=== Wicket-keeping records ===
Most dismissals
Dismissals	Player	Matches	Cat.	St.	Period
1	Vriitya Aravind	3	1	0	2022–2022
1	Aryansh Sharma	4	1	0	2026–2026
Last updated: 8 March 2026

=== Fielding records ===
Most catches
Catches	Player	Matches	Period
4	Alishan Sharafu	5	2022–2026
2	Kashif Daud	2	2022–2022
2	Basil Hameed	3	2022–2022
2	Khurram Khan	3	2014–2014
Last updated: 8 March 2026
