= 2022 Men's T20 World Cup squads =

List of cricketers

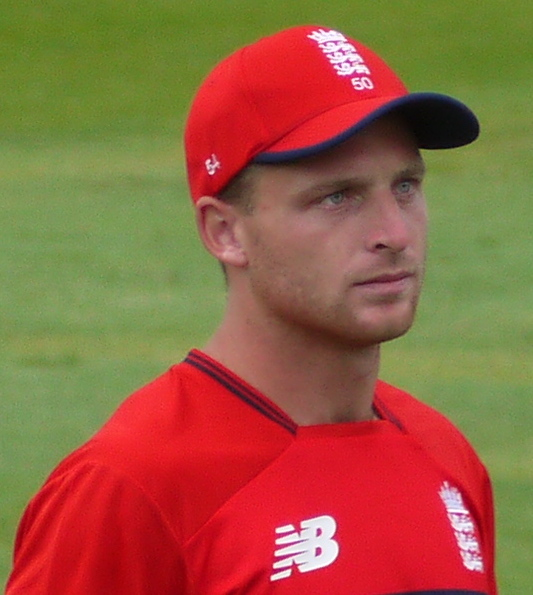
Jos Buttler captained England during their tournament win.

The 2022 ICC Men's T20 World Cup was the eighth ICC Men's T20 World Cup tournament, played in Australia from 16 October to 13 November 2022. Each team selected a squad of fifteen players before 10 October 2022. The player ages were as on 16 October 2022, the opening day of the tournament, and where a player played for more than one team in Twenty20 cricket, only their domestic team was listed (for example: at the time, Jos Buttler played for Lancashire Lightning).

== Afghanistan ==
Afghanistan announced their squad on 15 September 2022.

Coach: (England) Jonathan Trott

No.	Player	Date of birth	Batting	Bowling style	Domestic team
7	Mohammad Nabi (c)	1 January 1985 (aged 37)	Right	Right-arm off-spin	Kabul Eagles
1	Najibullah Zadran (vc)	28 February 1993 (aged 29)	Left	Right-arm off-spin	Speenghar Tigers
56	Fareed Ahmad	10 August 1994 (aged 28)	Left	Left-arm fast-medium	Speenghar Tigers
32	Qais Ahmad	15 August 2000 (aged 22)	Right	Right-arm leg spin	Kabul Eagles
5	Fazalhaq Farooqi	22 September 2000 (aged 22)	Right	Left-arm fast-medium	Boost Defenders
87	Usman Ghani	20 November 1996 (aged 25)	Right	Right-arm medium	Speenghar Tigers
21	Rahmanullah Gurbaz (wk)	28 November 2001 (aged 20)	Right	–	Kabul Eagles
19	Rashid Khan	20 September 1998 (aged 24)	Right	Right-arm leg break	Band-e-Amir Dragons
14	Gulbadin Naib^{1}	16 March 1991 (aged 31)	Right	Right-arm fast-medium	Mis Ainak Knights
77	Azmatullah Omarzai	24 March 2000 (aged 22)	Right	Right-arm medium-fast	Kabul Eagles
46	Darwish Rasooli	12 December 1999 (aged 22)	Right	Right-arm off-spin	Amo Sharks
68	Mohammad Saleem	9 September 2002 (aged 20)	Right	Right-arm fast	Boost Defenders
78	Naveen-ul-Haq	23 September 1999 (aged 23)	Right	Right-arm medium-fast	Kabul Eagles
88	Mujeeb Ur Rahman	28 March 2001 (aged 21)	Right	Right-arm off-spin	Hindukush Stars
18	Ibrahim Zadran	12 December 2001 (aged 20)	Right	Right-arm medium-fast	Kabul Eagles
Standby players
17	Sharafuddin Ashraf	10 January 1995 (aged 27)	Right	Slow left-arm orthodox	Speenghar Tigers
80	Rahmat Shah	6 July 1993 (aged 29)	Right	Right-arm leg break	Pamir Zalmi
40	Afsar Zazai	10 August 1993 (aged 29)	Right	—	Boost Defenders
Withdrawn players
3	Hazratullah Zazai^{1}	23 March 1998 (aged 24)	Left	Slow left-arm orthodox	Hindukush Stars

^{1}Hazratullah Zazai was ruled out of the tournament due to an injury and was replaced by Gulbadin Naib who was initially in the list of standby players.

== Australia ==
Australia announced their squad on 1 September 2022.

Coach: (Australia) Andrew McDonald

No.	Player	Date of birth	Batting	Bowling style	Domestic team
5	Aaron Finch (c)	17 November 1986 (aged 35)	Right	Slow left-arm orthodox	Melbourne Renegades
30	Pat Cummins (vc)	8 May 1993 (aged 29)	Right	Right-arm fast	—
46	Ashton Agar	14 October 1993 (aged 29)	Left	Slow left-arm orthodox	Perth Scorchers
85	Tim David	16 March 1996 (aged 26)	Right	Right-arm off-spin	Hobart Hurricanes
42	Cameron Green^{1}	3 June 1999 (aged 23)	Right	Right-arm fast-medium	Perth Scorchers
38	Josh Hazlewood	8 January 1991 (aged 31)	Left	Right-arm fast-medium	—
8	Mitchell Marsh	20 October 1991 (aged 30)	Right	Right-arm fast-medium	Perth Scorchers
32	Glenn Maxwell	14 October 1988 (aged 34)	Right	Right-arm off-spin	Melbourne Stars
55	Kane Richardson	12 February 1991 (aged 31)	Right	Right-arm fast-medium	Melbourne Renegades
49	Steve Smith	2 June 1989 (aged 33)	Right	Right-arm leg break	Sydney Sixers
56	Mitchell Starc	30 January 1990 (aged 32)	Left	Left-arm fast	Sydney Sixers
17	Marcus Stoinis	16 August 1989 (aged 33)	Right	Right-arm medium-fast	Melbourne Stars
13	Matthew Wade (wk)	26 December 1987 (aged 34)	Left	Right-arm medium-fast	Hobart Hurricanes
31	David Warner	27 October 1986 (aged 35)	Left	Right-arm leg break	Sydney Thunder
88	Adam Zampa	31 March 1992 (aged 30)	Right	Right-arm leg break	Melbourne Stars
Withdrawn players
48	Josh Inglis (wk)^{1}	4 March 1995 (aged 27)	Right	—	Perth Scorchers

^{1}Josh Inglis was ruled out of the tournament due to a hand injury and was replaced by Cameron Green.

== Bangladesh ==
Bangladesh announced their squad on 14 September 2022.

Coach: (India) Sridharan Sriram

No.	Player	Date of birth	Batting	Bowling style	Domestic team
75	Shakib Al Hasan (c)	24 March 1987 (aged 35)	Left	Slow left-arm orthodox	Fortune Barishal
10	Nasum Ahmed	5 December 1994 (aged 27)	Left	Left-arm orthodox	Chattogram Challengers
3	Taskin Ahmed	3 April 1995 (aged 27)	Left	Right-arm fast	Sylhet Sunrisers
20	Yasir Ali	6 March 1996 (aged 26)	Right	Right arm off-spin	Khulna Tigers
16	Litton Das (wk)	13 October 1994 (aged 28)	Right	—	Comilla Victorians
53	Mehidy Hasan	25 October 1997 (aged 24)	Right	Right-arm off-spin	Chattogram Challengers
18	Nurul Hasan (wk)	21 November 1990 (aged 31)	Right	Right-arm off-spin	Fortune Barishal
88	Afif Hossain	22 September 1999 (aged 23)	Left	Right-arm off-spin	Chattogram Challengers
58	Ebadot Hossain	7 January 1994 (aged 28)	Right	Right-arm fast-medium	Minister Dhaka
32	Mosaddek Hossain	10 December 1995 (aged 26)	Right	Right-arm off-spin	Sylhet Sunrisers
47	Shoriful Islam^{2}	3 June 2001 (aged 21)	Left	Left-arm medium-fast	Chattogram Challengers
91	Hasan Mahmud	12 October 1999 (aged 23)	Right	Right-arm fast-medium
90	Mustafizur Rahman	6 September 1995 (aged 27)	Left	Left-arm fast-medium	Comilla Victorians
59	Soumya Sarkar^{1}	25 February 1993 (aged 29)	Left	Right-arm medium	Khulna Tigers
99	Najmul Hossain Shanto	25 August 1998 (aged 24)	Left	Right-arm off-spin	Fortune Barishal
Standby players
55	Mahedi Hasan	12 December 1994 (aged 27)	Right	Right-arm off-spin	Khulna Tigers
22	Rishad Hossain	15 July 2002 (aged 20)	Right	Right-arm leg break	Minister Dhaka
1	Sabbir Rahman^{1}	22 November 1991 (aged 30)	Right	Right-arm leg break	Chattogram Challengers
74	Mohammad Saifuddin^{2}	1 November 1996 (aged 25)	Left	Right-arm fast-medium

^{1}Soumya Sarkar was initially named in the list of reserves and swapped places with Sabbir Rahman in the final squad.

^{2}Shoriful Islam was moved up from the list of reserves and replaced Mohammad Saifuddin, who was added to the reserves.

== England ==
England announced their squad on 2 September 2022.

Coach: (Australia) Matthew Mott

No.	Player	Date of birth	Batting	Bowling style	Domestic team
63	Jos Buttler (c, wk)	8 September 1990 (aged 32)	Right	–	Lancashire Lightning
18	Moeen Ali	18 June 1987 (aged 35)	Left	Right-arm off-spin	Worcestershire Rapids
88	Harry Brook	22 February 1999 (aged 23)	Right	Right-arm medium	Yorkshire Vikings
58	Sam Curran	3 June 1998 (aged 24)	Left	Left-arm medium-fast	Surrey
10	Alex Hales^{1}	3 January 1989 (aged 33)	Right	Right-arm medium	Notts Outlaws
34	Chris Jordan	4 October 1988 (aged 34)	Right	Right-arm fast-medium	Surrey
23	Liam Livingstone	4 August 1993 (aged 29)	Right	Right-arm leg break	Lancashire Lightning
29	Dawid Malan	3 September 1987 (aged 35)	Left	Right-arm leg break	Yorkshire Vikings
72	Tymal Mills^{2}	12 August 1992 (aged 30)	Right	Left-arm fast	Sussex Sharks
95	Adil Rashid	17 February 1988 (aged 34)	Right	Right-arm leg break	Yorkshire Vikings
61	Phil Salt	28 August 1996 (aged 26)	Right	Right-arm medium	Lancashire Lightning
55	Ben Stokes	4 June 1991 (aged 31)	Left	Right-arm fast medium	Durham
15	David Willey	28 February 1990 (aged 32)	Left	Left-arm fast-medium	Yorkshire Vikings
19	Chris Woakes	2 March 1989 (aged 33)	Right	Right-arm fast-medium	Birmingham Bears
33	Mark Wood	11 January 1990 (aged 32)	Right	Right-arm fast	Durham
Standby players
83	Liam Dawson	1 March 1990 (aged 32)	Right	Slow left-arm orthodox	Hampshire Hawks
71	Richard Gleeson	2 December 1987 (aged 34)	Right	Right-arm fast	Lancashire Lightning
77	Luke Wood^{3}	2 August 1995 (aged 27)	Left	Left-arm fast	Lancashire Lightning
Withdrawn players
51	Jonny Bairstow^{1}	26 September 1989 (aged 33)	Right	–	Yorkshire Vikings
38	Reece Topley^{2}	21 February 1994 (aged 28)	Right	Left-arm medium-fast	Surrey

^{1}Jonny Bairstow was ruled out of the tournament after sustaining a broken leg while playing golf. On 7 September, Alex Hales was named as Bairstow's replacement in the squad.

^{2}Reece Topley rolled his ankle while stepping on a boundary cushion during a fielding drill. Tymal Mills, one of the standby players, was named as his replacement.

^{3}Luke Wood was added as a travelling reserve.

== India ==
India announced their squad on 12 September 2022.

Coach: (India) Rahul Dravid

No.	Player	Date of birth	Batting	Bowling style	Domestic team
45	Rohit Sharma (c)	30 April 1987 (aged 35)	Right	Right-arm off-spin	Mumbai Indians
1	KL Rahul (vc)	18 April 1992 (aged 30)	Right	Right-arm medium	Lucknow Super Giants
99	Ravichandran Ashwin	17 September 1986 (aged 36)	Right	Right-arm off-spin	Rajasthan Royals
3	Yuzvendra Chahal	23 July 1990 (aged 32)	Right	Right-arm leg break	Rajasthan Royals
57	Deepak Hooda	19 April 1995 (aged 27)	Right	Right-arm off-spin	Lucknow Super Giants
19	Dinesh Karthik (wk)	1 June 1985 (aged 37)	Right	Right-arm off-spin	Royal Challengers Bangalore
18	Virat Kohli	5 November 1988 (aged 33)	Right	Right-arm medium	Royal Challengers Bangalore
15	Bhuvneshwar Kumar	5 February 1990 (aged 32)	Right	Right-arm medium-fast	Sunrisers Hyderabad
33	Hardik Pandya	11 October 1993 (aged 29)	Right	Right-arm fast- medium	Gujarat Titans
17	Rishabh Pant (wk)	4 October 1997 (aged 25)	Left	–	Delhi Capitals
20	Axar Patel	20 January 1994 (aged 28)	Left	Slow left-arm orthodox	Delhi Capitals
36	Harshal Patel	23 November 1990 (aged 31)	Right	Right-arm medium	Royal Challengers Bangalore
11	Mohammed Shami^{1}	3 September 1990 (aged 32)	Right	Right-arm fast	Gujarat Titans
2	Arshdeep Singh	5 February 1999 (aged 23)	Left	Left arm medium fast	Punjab Kings
63	Suryakumar Yadav	14 September 1990 (aged 32)	Right	Right-arm medium	Mumbai Indians
Standby players
56	Ravi Bishnoi	5 September 2000 (aged 22)	Right	Right-arm leg break	Lucknow Super Giants
41	Shreyas Iyer	6 December 1994 (aged 27)	Right	Right-arm leg break	Kolkata Knight Riders
73	Mohammed Siraj^{3}	13 March 1994 (aged 28)	Right	Right-arm medium-fast	Royal Challengers Bangalore
54	Shardul Thakur^{2}	16 October 1991 (aged 30)	Right	Right-arm fast-medium	Delhi Capitals
Withdrawn players
93	Jasprit Bumrah^{1}	6 December 1993 (aged 28)	Right	Right-arm fast	Mumbai Indians
90	Deepak Chahar^{2}	7 August 1992 (aged 30)	Right	Right-arm medium	Chennai Super Kings

^{1}Jasprit Bumrah was ruled out of the tournament after sustaining a back injury. On 14 October, Mohammed Shami was named as Bumrah's replacement.

^{2}Deepak Chahar was removed from the list of standby players due to a back injury. Shardul Thakur replaced him in the standby list.

^{3}Mohammed Siraj was added to the list of standby players.

== Ireland ==
Ireland announced their squad on 20 September 2022.

Coach: (South Africa) Heinrich Malan

No.	Player	Date of birth	Batting	Bowling style	Domestic team
63	Andrew Balbirnie (c)	28 December 1990 (aged 31)	Right	Right-arm off-spin	Leinster Lightning
1	Paul Stirling (vc)	3 September 1990 (aged 32)	Right	Right-arm off-spin	Northern Knights
32	Mark Adair	27 March 1996 (aged 26)	Right	Right-arm fast	Northern Knights
85	Curtis Campher	20 April 1999 (aged 23)	Right	Right-arm medium-fast	Munster Reds
64	Gareth Delany	28 April 1997 (aged 25)	Right	Right-arm leg break	Munster Reds
50	George Dockrell	22 July 1992 (aged 30)	Right	Slow left-arm orthodox	Leinster Lightning
20	Stephen Doheny	20 August 1998 (aged 24)	Right	Right-arm off-spin	North West Warriors
71	Fionn Hand	1 July 1998 (aged 24)	Right	Right-arm medium	Munster Reds
41	Graham Hume^{1}	23 November 1990 (aged 31)	Left	Right-arm fast-medium	North West Warriors
82	Josh Little	1 November 1999 (aged 22)	Right	Left-arm fast	Leinster Lightning
60	Barry McCarthy	13 September 1992 (aged 30)	Right	Right-arm fast-medium	Leinster Lightning
34	Conor Olphert	28 December 1995 (aged 26)	Right	Right-arm medium	North West Warriors
21	Simi Singh	4 February 1987 (aged 35)	Right	Right-arm off-spin	Leinster Lightning
13	Harry Tector	6 December 1999 (aged 22)	Right	Right-arm off-spin	Northern Knights
3	Lorcan Tucker (wk)	10 September 1996 (aged 26)	Right	–	Leinster Lightning
Withdrawn players
44	Craig Young^{1}	4 April 1990 (aged 32)	Right	Right-arm fast-medium	North West Warriors

^{1}Craig Young was ruled out of the tournament due to a chronic issue and was replaced by Graham Hume.

== Namibia ==
Namibia announced their squad on 13 September 2022.

Coach: (South Africa) Pierre de Bruyn

No.	Player	Date of birth	Batting	Bowling style	Domestic team
7	Gerhard Erasmus (c)	11 April 1995 (aged 27)	Right	Right-arm leg break
11	Stephan Baard	29 April 1992 (aged 30)	Right	Right-arm medium-fast
55	Karl Birkenstock	27 March 1996 (aged 26)	Left	Right-arm fast-medium
49	Jan Frylinck	6 April 1994 (aged 28)	Left	Left-arm medium-fast
48	Zane Green (wk)	11 October 1996 (aged 26)	Left	–
15	Divan la Cock	23 February 2003 (aged 19)	Right	Right-arm legbreak
19	Jan Nicol Loftie-Eaton	15 March 2000 (aged 22)	Left	Right-arm medium
06	Lo-handre Louwrens (wk)	24 April 1999 (aged 23)	Right	-
9	Tangeni Lungameni	17 April 1992 (aged 30)	Left	Left-arm medium
01	Bernard Scholtz	10 March 1990 (aged 32)	Right	Slow left-arm orthodox
47	Ben Shikongo	8 May 2000 (aged 22)	Right	Right-arm medium-fast
12	JJ Smit	10 November 1995 (aged 26)	Right	Left-arm medium-fast
70	Ruben Trumpelmann	1 February 1998 (aged 24)	Right	Left-arm fast
63	Michael van Lingen	24 October 1997 (aged 24)	Left	Left-arm medium
96	David Wiese	18 May 1985 (aged 37)	Right	Right-arm fast-medium
23	Pikky Ya France	23 April 1990 (aged 32)	Right	Right-arm off-spin

== Netherlands ==
The Netherlands announced their squad on 6 September 2022.

Coach: (Australia) Ryan Campbell

No.	Player	Date of birth	Batting	Bowling style	Domestic team
35	Scott Edwards (c, wk)	23 August 1996 (aged 26)	Right		VOC Rotterdam
48	Colin Ackermann	4 April 1991 (aged 31)	Right	Right-arm off-spin	—
18	Shariz Ahmad	21 April 2003 (aged 19)	Left	Legbreak Googly	VCC
26	Tom Cooper	26 November 1986 (aged 35)	Right	Right-arm off break	Kampong Utrecht
5	Bas de Leede	15 November 1999 (aged 22)	Right	Right-arm medium	VCC
20	Brandon Glover	3 April 1997 (aged 25)	Right	Right-arm fast	—
12	Fred Klaassen	13 November 1992 (aged 29)	Right	Left-arm medium-fast	—
97	Stephan Myburgh	28 February 1984 (aged 38)	Left	Right-arm off-spin	Punjab CCR
25	Teja Nidamanuru	22 August 1994 (aged 28)	Right	Right-arm off-spin	Punjab CCR
4	Max O'Dowd	4 March 1994 (aged 28)	Right	Right-arm off-spin	VOC Rotterdam
11	Tim Pringle	29 August 2002 (aged 20)	Right	Slow left-arm orthodox	HCC
7	Vikramjit Singh	9 January 2003 (aged 19)	Left	Right-arm medium fast	VRA Amsterdam
90	Logan van Beek	7 September 1990 (aged 32)	Right	Right-arm medium-fast	VCC
10	Timm van der Gugten	25 February 1991 (aged 31)	Right	Right-arm medium-fast	—
52	Roelof van der Merwe	31 December 1984 (aged 37)	Right	Slow left-arm orthodox	—
47	Paul van Meekeren	15 January 1993 (aged 29)	Right	Right-arm fast	—

== New Zealand ==
New Zealand announced their squad on 20 September 2022.

Coach: (New Zealand) Gary Stead

No.	Player	Date of birth	Batting	Bowling style	Domestic team
22	Kane Williamson (c)	8 August 1990 (aged 32)	Right	Right-arm off-spin	Northern Knights
16	Finn Allen (wk)	22 April 1999 (aged 23)	Right	Right-arm off-spin	Auckland Aces
18	Trent Boult	22 July 1989 (aged 33)	Right	Left-arm fast-medium	Northern Knights
4	Michael Bracewell	14 February 1991 (aged 31)	Left	Right-arm off-spin	Wellington Firebirds
80	Mark Chapman	27 June 1994 (aged 28)	Left	Slow left-arm orthodox	Auckland Aces
88	Devon Conway (wk)	8 July 1991 (aged 31)	Left	Right-arm medium	Wellington Firebirds
69	Lockie Ferguson	13 June 1991 (aged 31)	Right	Right-arm fast	Auckland Aces
31	Martin Guptill	30 September 1986 (aged 36)	Right	Right-arm off-spin	Auckland Aces
20	Adam Milne	13 April 1992 (aged 30)	Right	Right-arm fast	Central Stags
75	Daryl Mitchell	20 May 1991 (aged 31)	Right	Right-arm medium	Canterbury Kings
50	James Neesham	17 September 1990 (aged 32)	Left	Right-arm medium-fast	Wellington Firebirds
23	Glenn Phillips (wk)	6 December 1996 (aged 25)	Right	Right-arm off-spin	Otago Volts
74	Mitchell Santner	5 February 1992 (aged 30)	Left	Slow left-arm orthodox	Northern Knights
61	Ish Sodhi	31 October 1992 (aged 29)	Right	Right-arm leg break	Northern Knights
38	Tim Southee	11 December 1988 (aged 33)	Right	Right-arm fast-medium	Northern Knights

== Pakistan ==
Pakistan announced their squad on 15 September 2022.

Coach: (Pakistan) Saqlain Mushtaq

No.	Player	Date of birth	Batting	Bowling style	Domestic team
56	Babar Azam (c)	15 October 1994 (aged 28)	Right	Right-arm off-spin	Karachi Kings
7	Shadab Khan (vc)	4 October 1998 (aged 24)	Right	Right-arm leg break	Islamabad United
10	Shaheen Afridi	6 April 2000 (aged 22)	Left	Left-arm fast	Lahore Qalandars
95	Iftikhar Ahmed	3 September 1990 (aged 32)	Right	Right-arm off-spin	Quetta Gladiators
45	Asif Ali	1 October 1991 (aged 31)	Right	Right-arm medium-fast	Islamabad United
46	Haider Ali	2 October 2000 (aged 22)	Right	Right-arm medium	Peshawar Zalmi
29	Mohammad Haris^{2}	30 March 2001 (aged 21)	Right	Right-arm off break	Peshawar Zalmi
87	Mohammad Hasnain	5 April 2000 (aged 22)	Right	Right-arm fast	Quetta Gladiators
94	Shan Masood	14 October 1989 (aged 33)	Left	Right-arm medium-fast	Multan Sultans
21	Mohammad Nawaz	21 March 1994 (aged 28)	Left	Slow left-arm orthodox	Quetta Gladiators
97	Haris Rauf	7 November 1993 (aged 28)	Right	Right-arm fast	Lahore Qalandars
16	Mohammad Rizwan (wk)	1 June 1992 (aged 30)	Right	Right-arm medium	Multan Sultans
72	Khushdil Shah	7 February 1995 (aged 27)	Left	Slow left-arm orthodox	Multan Sultans
71	Naseem Shah	15 February 2003 (aged 19)	Right	Right-arm fast	Quetta Gladiators
74	Mohammad Wasim	25 August 2001 (aged 21)	Right	Right-arm medium	Islamabad United
Standby players
28	Shahnawaz Dahani	5 August 1998 (aged 24)	Right	Right-arm fast-medium	Multan Sultans
91	Usman Qadir^{1}	10 August 1993 (aged 29)	Left	Right-arm leg-break	Peshawar Zalmi
Withdrawn players
39	Fakhar Zaman^{1} ^{2}	10 April 1990 (aged 32)	Left	Slow left-arm orthodox	Lahore Qalandars

^{1}Usman Qadir was moved to the list of standby players after failing to recover from a thumb injury. Fakhar Zaman, who was initially in the standby list, replaced him.

^{2}Fakhar Zaman was ruled out of the tournament due to a knee injury and replaced by Mohammad Haris who was initially in the standby list.

== Scotland ==
Scotland announced their squad on 22 September 2022.

Coach: (South Africa) Shane Burger

No.	Player	Date of birth	Batting	Bowling style	Domestic team
44	Richie Berrington (c)	3 April 1987 (aged 35)	Right	Right-arm medium-fast
9	Matthew Cross (vc, wk)	15 October 1992 (aged 30)	Right	–
38	Josh Davey	3 August 1990 (aged 32)	Right	Right-arm medium-fast
13	Chris Greaves	12 October 1990 (aged 32)	Right	Right-arm leg break
49	Michael Jones	5 January 1998 (aged 24)	Right	Right-arm off-spin
29	Michael Leask	29 October 1990 (aged 31)	Right	Right-arm off-spin
10	Calum MacLeod	15 November 1988 (aged 33)	Right	Right-arm fast-medium
21	Brandon McMullen	18 October 1999 (aged 22)	Right	Right-arm medium
93	George Munsey	21 February 1993 (aged 29)	Left	Right-arm medium-fast
50	Safyaan Sharif	24 May 1991 (aged 31)	Right	Right-arm fast-medium
71	Chris Sole	27 February 1994 (aged 28)	Right	Right-arm fast-medium
32	Hamza Tahir	9 November 1995 (aged 26)	Right	Slow left-arm orthodox
18	Craig Wallace (wk)	27 June 1990 (aged 32)	Right	–
51	Mark Watt	29 July 1996 (aged 26)	Left	Slow left-arm orthodox
58	Brad Wheal	28 August 1996 (aged 25)	Right	Right-arm fast

== South Africa ==
South Africa announced their squad on 6 September 2022.

Coach: (South Africa) Mark Boucher

No.	Player	Date of birth	Batting	Bowling style	Domestic team
11	Temba Bavuma (c)	17 May 1990 (aged 32)	Right	Right-arm medium	Lions
12	Quinton de Kock (wk)	17 December 1992 (aged 29)	Left	Slow left-arm orthodox	Titans
17	Reeza Hendricks	14 August 1989 (aged 33)	Right	Right-arm off-break	Lions
70	Marco Jansen^{1}	1 May 2000 (aged 22)	Right	Left-arm fast	Warriors
45	Heinrich Klaasen (wk)	30 July 1991 (aged 31)	Right	Right-arm off-spin	Titans
16	Keshav Maharaj	7 February 1990 (aged 32)	Right	Slow left-arm orthodox	Dolphins
4	Aiden Markram	4 October 1994 (aged 28)	Right	Right-arm off-spin	Titans
10	David Miller	10 June 1989 (aged 33)	Left	Right-arm off-spin	Dolphins
22	Lungi Ngidi	29 March 1996 (aged 26)	Right	Right-arm fast	Titans
20	Anrich Nortje	16 November 1993 (aged 28)	Right	Right-arm fast	Warriors
7	Wayne Parnell	30 July 1989 (aged 33)	Left	Left-arm fast medium	Western Province
25	Kagiso Rabada	25 May 1995 (aged 27)	Right	Right-arm fast	Lions
32	Rilee Rossouw	9 October 1989 (aged 33)	Left	Right-arm off break	Knights
26	Tabraiz Shamsi	18 February 1990 (aged 32)	Right	Left-arm unorthodox	Titans
30	Tristan Stubbs	14 August 2000 (aged 22)	Right	Right-arm off break	Warriors
Standby players
77	Bjorn Fortuin	21 October 1994 (aged 27)	Right	Slow left-arm orthodox	Lions
23	Andile Phehlukwayo	3 March 1996 (aged 26)	Left	Right-arm fast-medium	Dolphins
6	Lizaad Williams^{2}	1 October 1993 (aged 29)	Left	Right-arm medium-fast	Titans
Withdrawn players
29	Dwaine Pretorius^{1}	29 March 1989 (aged 33)	Right	Right-arm medium-fast	North West

^{1}Dwaine Pretorius was ruled out of the tournament due to a fractured thumb. He was replaced by Marco Jansen who was moved up from the list of reserves.

^{2}Lizaad Williams was added to the list of standby players.

== Sri Lanka ==
Sri Lanka announced their squad on 16 September 2022.

Coach: (England) Chris Silverwood

No.	Player	Date of birth	Batting	Bowling style	Domestic team
7	Dasun Shanaka (c)	9 September 1991 (aged 31)	Right	Right-arm medium	Dambulla Giants
72	Charith Asalanka	29 June 1997 (aged 25)	Left	Right-arm off-spin	Colombo Stars
10	Ashen Bandara^{1} ^{4}	23 November 1999 (aged 23)	Right	Right-arm leg break	Kandy Falcons
75	Dhananjaya de Silva	6 September 1991 (aged 31)	Right	Right-arm off-spin	Jaffna Kings
78	Asitha Fernando^{5}	31 July 1997 (aged 25)	Right	Right-arm medium-fast	–
49	Wanindu Hasaranga	29 July 1997 (aged 25)	Right	Right-arm leg break	Kandy Falcons
29	Chamika Karunaratne	29 May 1996 (aged 26)	Right	Right-arm medium-fast	Kandy Falcons
8	Lahiru Kumara	13 February 1997 (aged 25)	Left	Right-arm fast-medium	Dambulla Giants
40	Pramod Madushan	14 December 1993 (aged 28)	Right	Right-arm fast-medium	Dambulla Giants
13	Kusal Mendis (wk)	2 February 1995 (aged 27)	Right	Right-arm leg break	Galle Gladiators
18	Pathum Nissanka	18 May 1998 (aged 24)	Right	–	Kandy Falcons
54	Bhanuka Rajapaksa (wk)	24 October 1991 (aged 30)	Left	Right-arm medium	Dambulla Giants
65	Kasun Rajitha^{3}	1 June 1993 (aged 29)	Right	Right-arm medium-fast	Dambulla Giants
61	Maheesh Theekshana	1 August 2000 (aged 22)	Right	Right-arm off-spin	Jaffna Kings
46	Jeffrey Vandersay	5 February 1990 (aged 32)	Right	Right-arm leg break	Colombo Stars
Standby players
56	Dinesh Chandimal	18 November 1989 (aged 32)	Right	Right-arm off-spin	Colombo Stars
48	Niroshan Dickwella^{6}	23 June 1993 (aged 29)	Left	–	Colombo Stars
27	Nuwanidu Fernando	13 October 1999 (aged 22)	Right	Right-arm off-spin	Galle Gladiators
12	Praveen Jayawickrama^{1}	30 September 1998 (aged 23)	Right	Slow left-arm orthodox	Jaffna Kings
9	Matheesha Pathirana^{6}	18 December 2002 (aged 19)	Right	Right-arm fast	Kandy Falcons
Withdrawn players
5	Dushmantha Chameera^{3}	11 January 1992 (aged 30)	Right	Right-arm fast	Galle Gladiators
71	Binura Fernando^{2} ^{5}	12 July 1995 (aged 27)	Right	Left-arm medium-fast	Jaffna Kings
70	Danushka Gunathilaka^{4}	17 March 1991 (aged 31)	Left	Right-arm off-spin	Galle Gladiators
98	Dilshan Madushanka^{2}	18 September 2000 (aged 22)	Right	Left-arm fast	Jaffna Kings

^{1}Two of the standby players, Ashen Bandara and Praveen Jayawickrama, will be travelling with the squad.

^{2}Dilshan Madushanka was ruled out of the tournament due to a quadriceps injury. Binura Fernando who was in the list of standby players was approved as his replacement.

^{3}Dushmantha Chameera was ruled out of the remainder of the tournament after injuring his left calf. Kasun Rajitha replaced him.

^{4}Danushka Gunathilaka was ruled out of the remainder of the tournament due to a hamstring tear and was replaced by one of the standby players, Ashen Bandara.

^{5}Binura Fernando was ruled out of the remainder of the tournament due to an injury he suffered during Sri Lanka's match against Australia. He was replaced by Asitha Fernando.

^{6}Niroshan Dickwella and Matheesha Pathirana were added as standby players.

== United Arab Emirates ==
United Arab Emirates announced their squad on 17 September 2022.

Coach: (India) Robin Singh

No.	Player	Date of birth	Batting	Bowling style	Domestic team
86	Chundangapoyil Rizwan (c)	19 April 1988 (aged 34)	Right	Right-arm leg break	—
33	Vriitya Aravind (vc, wk)	11 June 2002 (aged 20)	Right	—	—
91	Sabir Ali	7 November 1991 (aged 30)	Right	Left-arm fast-medium	—
14	Kashif Daud	10 February 1986 (aged 36)	Right	Right-arm medium-fast	—
17	Basil Hameed	15 April 1992 (aged 30)	Right	Right-arm off-spim	—
50	Aayan Afzal Khan	15 November 2005 (aged 16)	Right	Right-arm off-spin	—
19	Zahoor Khan	25 May 1989 (aged 33)	Right	Right-arm medium-fast	—
77	Aryan Lakra	13 December 2001 (aged 20)	Left	Slow left-arm orthodox	—
8	Karthik Meiyappan	8 October 2000 (aged 22)	Right	Right-arm leg break	—
55	Fahad Nawaz^{1}	16 January 2000 (aged 22)	Right	Slow left-arm orthodox	—
69	Ahmed Raza	10 October 1988 (aged 34)	Right	Slow left-arm orthodox	—
7	Alishan Sharafu	10 January 2003 (aged 19)	Right	Right-arm fast-medium	—
92	Junaid Siddique	6 December 1992 (aged 29)	Right	Right-arm medium-fast	—
15	Chirag Suri	18 February 1995 (aged 27)	Right	Right-arm off-spin/leg break	—
10	Muhammad Waseem	12 February 1994 (aged 28)	Right	Right-arm medium	—
Standby players
29	Sultan Ahmed	11 October 1989 (aged 33)	Right	Right-arm off-spin	—
22	Sanchit Sharma	22 July 2001 (aged 21)	Right	Right-arm medium	—
57	Adhitya Shetty	5 July 2004 (aged 18)	Right	Right-arm leg break	—
12	Vishnu Sukumaran	31 December 1990 (aged 31)	Right	Slow left-arm orthodox	—
Withdrawn players
23	Zawar Farid^{1}	25 July 1992 (aged 30)	Right	Right-arm medium	—

^{1}Zawar Farid was ruled out of the remainder of the tournament due to a fractured foot. He was replaced by Fahad Nawaz who was one of the standby players.

== West Indies ==
The West Indies announced their squad on 14 September 2022.

Coach: (Cricket West Indies) Phil Simmons

No.	Player	Date of birth	Batting	Bowling style	Domestic team
29	Nicholas Pooran (c, wk)	2 October 1995 (aged 27)	Left	Right-arm off-spin	Trinbago Knight Riders
52	Rovman Powell (vc)	23 July 1993 (aged 29)	Right	Right-arm fast medium	Jamaica Tallawahs
13	Shamarh Brooks^{1}	1 October 1988 (aged 34)	Right	Leg break	Jamaica Tallawahs
59	Yannic Cariah	22 June 1992 (aged 30)	Left	Right-arm leg spin	—
25	Johnson Charles (wk)	14 January 1989 (aged 33)	Right	—	Saint Lucia Kings
19	Sheldon Cottrell	19 August 1989 (aged 33)	Right	Left-arm fast-medium	St Kitts & Nevis Patriots
98	Jason Holder	4 January 1991 (aged 31)	Right	Right-arm fast-medium	Barbados Royals
21	Akeal Hosein	25 April 1993 (aged 29)	Left	Slow left-arm orthodox	Trinbago Knight Riders
8	Alzarri Joseph	20 November 1996 (aged 25)	Right	Right-arm fast	Saint Lucia Kings
53	Brandon King	16 December 1994 (aged 27)	Right	—	Jamaica Tallawahs
17	Evin Lewis	27 December 1991 (aged 30)	Left	Right-arm medium	St Kitts & Nevis Patriots
71	Kyle Mayers	8 September 1992 (aged 30)	Left	Right-arm medium	Barbados Royals
61	Obed McCoy	4 January 1997 (aged 25)	Left	Left-arm fast-medium	Barbados Royals
87	Raymon Reifer	11 May 1991 (aged 31)	Left	Left-arm medium fast	Jamaica Tallawahs
58	Odean Smith	1 November 1996 (aged 25)	Right	Right arm fast-medium	Guyana Amazon Warriors
Withdrawn players
2	Shimron Hetmyer^{1}	26 December 1996 (aged 25)	Left	—	Guyana Amazon Warriors

^{1}Shimron Hetmyer was ruled out of the tournament after missing his flight to Australia and was replaced by Shamarh Brooks.

== Zimbabwe ==
Zimbabwe announced their squad on 15 September 2022.

Coach: (Zimbabwe) David Houghton

No.	Player	Date of birth	Batting	Bowling style	Domestic team
77	Craig Ervine (c)	19 August 1985 (aged 37)	Left	Right-arm off-break	Matabeleland Tuskers
54	Ryan Burl	15 April 1994 (aged 28)	Left	Right-arm leg break	Mashonaland Eagles
5	Regis Chakabva (wk)	20 September 1987 (aged 35)	Right	Right-arm off-break	Mashonaland Eagles
13	Tendai Chatara	28 February 1991 (aged 31)	Right	Right-arm fast-medium	Mountaineers
80	Brad Evans	24 March 1997 (aged 25)	Right	Right-arm fast	Mashonaland Eagles
75	Luke Jongwe	6 February 1995 (aged 27)	Right	Right-arm fast-medium	Matabeleland Tuskers
42	Clive Madande (wk)	12 April 2000 (aged 22)	Right	—	Matabeleland Tuskers
17	Wesley Madhevere	4 September 2000 (aged 22)	Right	Right-arm off-break	Mashonaland Eagles
11	Wellington Masakadza	4 October 1993 (aged 29)	Left	Slow left-arm orthodox	Mashonaland Eagles
32	Tony Munyonga	31 January 1999 (aged 23)	Right	Right-arm off-break	Mashonaland Eagles
40	Blessing Muzarabani	2 October 1996 (aged 26)	Right	Right-arm fast-medium	Mashonaland Eagles
39	Richard Ngarava	28 December 1997 (aged 24)	Left	Left-arm fast-medium	Mountaineers
24	Sikandar Raza	24 April 1986 (aged 36)	Right	Right-arm off-spin	Matabeleland Tuskers
3	Milton Shumba	19 October 2000 (aged 21)	Left	Slow left-arm orthodox	Matabeleland Tuskers
14	Sean Williams	26 September 1986 (aged 36)	Left	Slow left-arm orthodox	Matabeleland Tuskers
Standby players
27	Tanaka Chivanga	24 July 1993 (aged 29)
9	Innocent Kaia	10 August 1992 (aged 30)	Right		Mountaineers
64	Kevin Kasuza	20 June 1993 (aged 29)	Right	Right-arm off break	Mountaineers
49	Tadiwanashe Marumani	2 January 2002 (aged 20)	Right
61	Victor Nyauchi	8 July 1992 (aged 30)	Right	Right-arm fast-medium	Mountaineers
