= 2022 United Arab Emirates Tri-Nation Series (round 10) =

Cricket tournament

- Part of 2019–2023 ICC Cricket World Cup League 2
- Date: 15–22 March 2022
- Location: United Arab Emirates
Teams
Nepal	Papua New Guinea	United Arab Emirates
Captains
Sandeep Lamichhane	Assad Vala	Ahmed Raza
Most runs
Rohit Paudel (159)	Assad Vala (178)	Rohan Mustafa (188)
Most wickets
Sompal Kami (11)	Chad Soper (6); Alei Nao (6)	Basil Hameed (9)

The 2022 United Arab Emirates Tri-Nation Series was the 10th round of the 2019–2023 ICC Cricket World Cup League 2 cricket tournament that took place in the United Arab Emirates in March 2022. Originally scheduled to take place in February 2023, it was moved back to March 2022 due to fixtures impacted by the COVID-19 pandemic being rearranged.

It was a tri-nation series comprising Nepal, Papua New Guinea and the United Arab Emirates cricket teams, with the matches played as One Day International (ODI) fixtures. The ICC Cricket World Cup League 2 formed part of the qualification pathway to the 2023 Cricket World Cup.

In the week before the series, the UAE competed in another tri-nation series, winning two of their four games. In preparation for the series, Nepal played four warm-up matches in Sri Lanka, winning twice against Sri Lanka Navy Club and once against Sri Lanka Police, before losing to a Sri Lanka Combined XI.

On 19 March 2022, Papua New Guinea registered their first win in their 15th match of the Cricket World Cup League 2, when they beat the United Arab Emirates by six wickets.

== Squads ==
Nepal	Papua New Guinea	United Arab Emirates
Sandeep Lamichhane (c); Dipendra Singh Airee; Kamal Singh Airee; Binod Bhandari; Kushal Bhurtel; Sagar Dhakal; Sompal Kami; Karan KC; Gyanendra Malla; Rohit Paudel; Pawan Sarraf; Bhim Sharki; Aarif Sheikh; Aasif Sheikh; Bikram Sob; Bibek Yadav	Assad Vala (c); Charles Amini; Simon Atai; Dogodo Bau; Sese Bau; Riley Hekure; Hiri Hiri; Semo Kamea; Jason Kila; Kabua Morea; Alei Nao; Nosaina Pokana; Lega Siaka; Chad Soper; Tony Ura; Norman Vanua	Ahmed Raza (c); Vriitya Aravind (wk); Kashif Daud; Basil Hameed; Asif Khan; Zahoor Khan; Aryan Lakra; Rohan Mustafa; Akif Raja; Chundangapoyil Rizwan; Alishan Sharafu; Junaid Siddique; Chirag Suri; Muhammad Waseem

On 28 February 2022, Nepal named a preliminary squad of 20 players for the tournament. On 3 March 2022, the squad was cut to 16 players as the team travelled to Sri Lanka for a series of warm-up matches before travelling on to the UAE. Mohammad Boota, Karthik Meiyappan and Rahul Bhatia were named as reserves in the UAE squad.

== Fixtures ==
=== 1st ODI ===
15 March 2022
09:30
Scorecard

Papua New Guinea; 176/8 (50 overs)	v	United Arab Emirates; 179/3 (44.3 overs)
Assad Vala 46 (72); Basil Hameed 4/19 (10 overs)		Asif Khan 81* (102); Chad Soper 2/29 (9 overs)

United Arab Emirates won by 7 wickets
Sharjah Cricket Stadium, Sharjah
Umpires: Shiju Sam (UAE) and Raveendra Wimalasiri (SL)
Player of the match: Basil Hameed (UAE)

- Papua New Guinea won the toss and elected to bat.

=== 2nd ODI ===
16 March 2022
09:30
Scorecard

Papua New Guinea; 204/8 (50 overs)	v	Nepal; 208/8 (49.2 overs)
Charles Amini 59 (82); Sompal Kami 3/48 (10 overs)		Rohit Paudel 60 (83); Riley Hekure 2/32 (9.2 overs)

Nepal won by 2 wickets
Sharjah Cricket Stadium, Sharjah
Umpires: Akbar Ali (UAE) and Shiju Sam (UAE)
Player of the match: Rohit Paudel (Nep)

- Papua New Guinea won the toss and elected to bat.
- Sagar Dhakal (Nep) made his ODI debut.

=== 3rd ODI ===
18 March 2022
09:30
Scorecard

United Arab Emirates; 168 (46.3 overs)	v	Nepal; 120 (35.1 overs)
Rohan Mustafa 40 (81); Sompal Kami 4/39 (9 overs)		Rohit Paudel 46 (60); Basil Hameed 4/15 (5 overs)

United Arab Emirates won by 48 runs
Dubai International Cricket Stadium, Dubai
Umpires: Akbar Ali (UAE) and Raveendra Wimalasiri (SL)
Player of the match: Rohan Mustafa (UAE)

- United Arab Emirates won the toss and elected to bat.

=== 4th ODI ===
19 March 2022
09:30
Scorecard

United Arab Emirates; 147 (50 overs)	v	Papua New Guinea; 150/4 (36.2 overs)
Rohan Mustafa 88 (144); Alei Nao 4/27 (10 overs)		Assad Vala 68* (97); Kashif Daud 1/9 (5 overs)

Papua New Guinea won by 6 wickets
Dubai International Cricket Stadium, Dubai
Umpires: Shiju Sam (UAE) and Raveendra Wimalasiri (SL)
Player of the match: Alei Nao (PNG)

- United Arab Emirates won the toss and elected to bat.

=== 5th ODI ===
21 March 2022
09:30
Scorecard

United Arab Emirates; 202/9 (50 overs)	v	Nepal; 103 (35.1 overs)
Rohan Mustafa 60 (73); Sandeep Lamichhane 3/32 (10 overs)		Gyanendra Malla 30 (65); Junaid Siddique 4/23 (8 overs)

United Arab Emirates won by 99 runs
Dubai International Cricket Stadium, Dubai
Umpires: Akbar Ali (UAE) and Raveendra Wimalasiri (SL)
Player of the match: Rohan Mustafa (UAE)

- Nepal won the toss and elected to field.
- Nepal scored their lowest total in ODI cricket.

=== 6th ODI ===
22 March 2022
09:30
Scorecard

Papua New Guinea; 173/8 (50 overs)	v	Nepal; 174/3 (37 overs)
Assad Vala 45 (96); Sandeep Lamichhane 2/29 (10 overs)		Aarif Sheikh 59* (102); Charles Amini 2/36 (8 overs)

Nepal won by 7 wickets
Dubai International Cricket Stadium, Dubai
Umpires: Akbar Ali (UAE) and Shiju Sam (UAE)
Player of the match: Aarif Sheikh (Nep)

- Nepal won the toss and elected to field.
- Bhim Sharki (Nep) made his ODI debut.
