= 2021 Summer T20 Bash =

International cricket tour

- Dates: 5 – 10 October 2021
- Administrator: Emirates Cricket Board
- Cricket format: Twenty20 International
- Host: UAE
- Participants: 5
- Matches: 7

The 2021 Summer T20 Bash was a series of Twenty20 International (T20I) cricket matches played in the United Arab Emirates in October 2021 between Ireland, Namibia, Papua New Guinea, Scotland and the United Arab Emirates. The UAE played one match against Namibia and three matches against Ireland, Scotland played one match against Namibia and one against Papua New Guinea, and Papua New Guinea and Namibia played one match against each other. The matches were used as preparation for the 2021 ICC Men's T20 World Cup.

Two non-T20I twenty-over matches were also played, with Scotland beating Ireland by five wickets, and Namibia recording an 84 run victory over Papua New Guinea.

== Squads ==
Ireland	Namibia	Papua New Guinea	Scotland	United Arab Emirates
Andrew Balbirnie (c); Mark Adair; Curtis Campher; Gareth Delany; George Dockrell; Shane Getkate; Graham Kennedy; Josh Little; Andy McBrine; Barry McCarthy; Kevin O'Brien; Neil Rock (wk); Simi Singh; Paul Stirling; Harry Tector; Lorcan Tucker (wk); Ben White; Craig Young	Gerhard Erasmus (c); JJ Smit (vc); Stephan Baard; Karl Birkenstock; Michiel du Preez; Jan Frylinck; Zane Green (wk); Jan Nicol Loftie-Eaton; Bernard Scholtz; Ben Shikongo; Ruben Trumpelmann; Michael van Lingen; David Wiese; Craig Williams; Pikky Ya France	Assad Vala (c); Charles Amini; Simon Atai; Sese Bau; Kiplin Doriga; Jack Gardner; Hiri Hiri; Jason Kila; Kabua Morea; Nosaina Pokana; Damien Ravu; Lega Siaka; Chad Soper; Gaudi Toka; Tony Ura; Norman Vanua	Kyle Coetzer (c); Richie Berrington (vc); Dylan Budge; Matthew Cross; Josh Davey; Alasdair Evans; Chris Greaves; Ollie Hairs; Michael Leask; Calum MacLeod; George Munsey; Safyaan Sharif; Chris Sole; Hamza Tahir; Craig Wallace (wk); Mark Watt; Brad Wheal	Ahmed Raza (c); Sultan Ahmed; Vriitya Aravind (wk); Mohammad Boota; Kashif Daud; Basil Hameed; Zahoor Khan; Palaniapan Meiyappan; Rohan Mustafa; Akif Raja; Chundangapoyil Rizwan; Alishan Sharafu; Sanchit Sharma; Chirag Suri; Muhammad Usman; Muhammad Waseem

== Warm-up matches ==
5 October 2021
12:00
Scorecard

Ireland; 176 (20 overs)	v	Scotland; 178/5 (17.5 overs)
Harry Tector 38 (33); Safyaan Sharif 2/27 (4 overs)		George Munsey 67 (25); Ben White 2/35 (4 overs)

Scotland won by 5 wickets
ICC Academy Ground 2, Dubai
Umpires: Aasif Iqbal (UAE) and Shiju Sam (UAE)
Player of the match: George Munsey (Sco)

- Scotland won the toss and elected to field.

6 October 2021
09:30
Scorecard

Namibia; 249/3 (20 overs)	v	Papua New Guinea; 165/9 (20 overs)
Gerhard Erasmus 129* (60); Nosaina Pokana 2/37 (4 overs)		Lega Siaka 33 (23); Karl Birkenstock 4/33 (4 overs)

Namibia won by 84 runs
ICC Academy Ground 2, Dubai
Umpires: Akbar Ali (UAE) and Andrew Louw (Nam)
Player of the match: Gerhard Erasmus (Nam)

- Papua New Guinea won the toss and elected to field.

== Fixtures ==
=== 1st T20I ===
5 October 2021
09:30
Scorecard

Namibia; 159/8 (20 overs)	v	United Arab Emirates; 142/9 (20 overs)
Craig Williams 57 (37); Zahoor Khan 4/29 (4 overs)		Muhammad Waseem 39 (36); Jan Frylinck 6/24 (4 overs)

Namibia won by 17 runs
ICC Academy Ground, Dubai
Umpires: Iftikhar Ali (UAE) and Andrew Louw (Nam)
Player of the match: Jan Frylinck (Nam)

- United Arab Emirates won the toss and elected to field.
- Kashif Daud, Muhammad Waseem (UAE) and Ruben Trumpelmann (Nam) all made their T20I debuts.
- David Wiese also made his T20I debut for Namibia after previously playing twenty T20Is for South Africa, becoming the tenth cricketer to represent two international teams in T20Is.
- Jan Frylinck (Nam) took his first five-wicket haul in T20Is.

=== 2nd T20I ===
7 October 2021
09:30
Scorecard

United Arab Emirates; 123/7 (20 overs)	v	Ireland; 124/3 (18.5 overs)
Muhammad Usman 35 (32); Curtis Campher 3/19 (4 overs)		Paul Stirling 53 (46); Basil Hameed 3/20 (3.5 overs)

Ireland won by 7 wickets
ICC Academy Ground, Dubai
Umpires: Akbar Ali (UAE) and Shiju Sam (UAE)
Player of the match: Curtis Campher (Ire)

- United Arab Emirates won the toss and elected to bat.
- Sanchit Sharma (UAE) made his T20I debut.

=== 3rd T20I ===
8 October 2021
09:00
Scorecard

United Arab Emirates; 163/4 (20 overs)	v	Ireland; 109 (18.4 overs)
Chirag Suri 51 (44); Josh Little 1/24 (4 overs)		Curtis Campher 22 (16); Karthik Meiyappan 4/25 (4 overs)

United Arab Emirates won by 54 runs
ICC Academy Ground, Dubai
Umpires: Iftikhar Ali (UAE) and Andrew Louw (Nam)
Player of the match: Karthik Meiyappan (UAE)

- Ireland won the toss and elected to field.
- Karthik Meiyappan and Akif Raja (UAE) both made their T20I debuts.

=== 4th T20I ===
8 October 2021
13:30
Scorecard

Papua New Guinea; 154/5 (20 overs)	v	Scotland; 156/2 (17.5 overs)
Assad Vala 55 (43); Hamza Tahir 2/35 (4 overs)		George Munsey 50 (33); Chad Soper 1/23 (2 overs)

Scotland won by 8 wickets
ICC Academy Ground, Dubai
Umpires: Akbar Ali (UAE) and Shiju Sam (UAE)
Player of the match: George Munsey (Sco)

- Papua New Guinea won the toss and elected to bat.
- Kabua Morea (PNG) and Chris Greaves (Sco) both made their T20I debuts.

=== 5th T20I ===
9 October 2021
09:30
Scorecard

Scotland; 137/8 (20 overs)	v	Namibia; 138/5 (17.4 overs)
Richie Berrington 61 (46); Ruben Trumpelmann 2/23 (4 overs)		Craig Williams 50 (37); Mark Watt 2/11 (4 overs)

Namibia won by 5 wickets
ICC Academy Ground, Dubai
Umpires: Iftikhar Ali (UAE) and Shiju Sam (UAE)
Player of the match: Craig Williams (Nam)

- Namibia won the toss and elected to field.

=== 6th T20I ===
10 October 2021
09:00
Scorecard

Ireland; 134/5 (20 overs)	v	United Arab Emirates; 139/3 (16.1 overs)
Kevin O'Brien 54 (45); Rohan Mustafa 3/23 (4 overs)		Muhammad Waseem 107* (62); Craig Young 2/29 (4 overs)

United Arab Emirates won by 7 wickets
ICC Academy Ground, Dubai
Umpires: Akbar Ali (UAE) and Andrew Louw (Nam)
Player of the match: Muhammad Waseem (UAE)

- United Arab Emirates won the toss and elected to field.
- Muhammad Waseem (UAE) scored his first century in T20Is.

=== 7th T20I ===
10 October 2021
13:30
Scorecard

Namibia; 174/6 (20 overs)	v	Papua New Guinea; 160/6 (20 overs)
Craig Williams 57 (43); Assad Vala 2/10 (2 overs)		Tony Ura 69 (43); JJ Smit 2/24 (4 overs)

Namibia won by 14 runs
ICC Academy Ground, Dubai
Umpires: Iftikhar Ali (UAE) and Aasif Iqbal (UAE)
Player of the match: JJ Smit (Nam)

- Papua New Guinea won the toss and elected to field.
- Michael van Lingen (Nam) made his T20I debut.
