= 2022 United States Tri-Nation Series (May) =

Cricket tournament

- Part of 2019–2023 ICC Cricket World Cup League 2
- Date: 28 May–4 June 2022
- Location: United States
- Player of the series: (United Arab Emirates) Vriitya Aravind
Teams
Scotland	United Arab Emirates	United States
Captains
Kyle Coetzer	Ahmed Raza	Monank Patel
Most runs
Kyle Coetzer (163)	Vriitya Aravind (206)	Aaron Jones (175)
Most wickets
Chris Sole (8)	Ahmed Raza (8)	Saurabh Netravalkar (8)

The 2022 United States Tri-Nation Series was the twelfth round of the 2019–2023 ICC Cricket World Cup League 2, that took place in the United States in May and June 2022. It was a tri-nation series between Scotland, the United Arab Emirates and the United States cricket teams, with the matches played as One Day International (ODI) fixtures. The ICC Cricket World Cup League 2 forms part of the qualification pathway to the 2023 Cricket World Cup. In April 2022, USA Cricket confirmed all the fixtures for the series, with all the matches taking place at the Moosa Stadium in Pearland.

Originally the series was scheduled to take place in April 2020. The fixtures were initially confirmed on 5 February 2020, with all the matches scheduled to take place at the Central Broward Regional Park in Lauderhill. However, on 13 March 2020, the series was postponed due to the COVID-19 pandemic and increased travel restrictions to the United States. In December 2020, the ICC announced the rescheduled dates for the series.

Prior to the penultimate match of the series, Scotland's captain Kyle Coetzer announced that he would step down as the team captain following the conclusion of Scotland's match against the United Arab Emirates.

== Squads ==
Scotland	United Arab Emirates	United States
Kyle Coetzer (c); Richie Berrington; Dylan Budge; Matthew Cross (wk); Oliver Davidson; Chris Greaves; Michael Leask; Calum MacLeod; Gavin Main; George Munsey; Adrian Neill; Safyaan Sharif; Chris Sole; Hamza Tahir	Ahmed Raza (c); Vriitya Aravind; Rahul Bhatia; Kashif Daud; Zawar Farid; Basil Hameed; Zahoor Khan; Karthik Meiyappan; Rohan Mustafa; Akif Raja; Chundangapoyil Rizwan; Alishan Sharafu; Junaid Siddique; Chirag Suri; Muhammad Waseem	Monank Patel (c); Aaron Jones (vc); Rahul Jariwala; Nosthush Kenjige; Ali Khan; ~~Jaskaran Malhotra~~; Sushant Modani; Yasir Mohammad; Saiteja Mukkamalla; Saurabh Netravalkar; Nisarg Patel; Gajanand Singh; Cameron Stevenson; Steven Taylor; Rusty Theron

Brad Currie was also named in Scotland's squad as a travelling reserve player. Jaskaran Malhotra was ruled out of the USA's squad after suffering a fracture in his hand, with Saiteja Mukkamalla named as his replacement.

== Fixtures ==
=== 1st ODI ===
28 May 2022
10:30
Scorecard

United States; 310/5 (50 overs)	v	Scotland; 206 (46.1 overs)
Sushant Modani 77 (92); Adrian Neill 2/49 (8 overs)		George Munsey 54 (53); Saurabh Netravalkar 5/45 (10 overs)

United States won by 104 runs
Moosa Stadium, Pearland
Umpires: Sameer Bandekar (USA) and Leslie Reifer (WI)
Player of the match: Saurabh Netravalkar (USA)

- United States won the toss and elected to bat.
- Saiteja Mukkamalla (USA) made his ODI debut.
- This was the first ODI match to be played at this ground.

=== 2nd ODI ===
29 May 2022
10:30
Scorecard

Scotland; 300/7 (50 overs)	v	United States; 189 (42.4 overs)
Richie Berrington 107* (90); Cameron Stevenson 2/55 (10 overs)		Aaron Jones 38 (62); Chris Sole 3/40 (7.4 overs)

Scotland won by 111 runs
Moosa Stadium, Pearland
Umpires: Jermaine Lindo (USA) and Leslie Reifer (WI)
Player of the match: Richie Berrington (Sco)

- Scotland won the toss and elected to bat.
- Chris Greaves (Sco) made his ODI debut.
- Saurabh Netravalkar became the USA's leading wicket-taker in limited overs cricket.

=== 3rd ODI ===
31 May 2022
10:30
Scorecard

United Arab Emirates; 215/9 (50 overs)	v	Scotland; 217/6 (48 overs)
Chirag Suri 69 (121); Chris Sole 4/27 (9 overs)		Kyle Coetzer 108* (142); Basil Hameed 2/43 (9.4 overs)

Scotland won by 4 wickets
Moosa Stadium, Pearland
Umpires: Sameer Bandekar (USA) and Vijaya Mallela (USA)
Player of the match: Kyle Coetzer (Sco)

- United Arab Emirates won the toss and elected to bat.

=== 4th ODI ===
1 June 2022
10:30
Scorecard

United Arab Emirates; 203/7 (50 overs)	v	United States; 204/6 (44.5 overs)
Chundangapoyil Rizwan 67 (93); Cameron Stevenson 2/34 (8 overs)		Sushant Modani 70 (102); Ahmed Raza 3/46 (10 overs)

United States won by 4 wickets
Moosa Stadium, Pearland
Umpires: Jermaine Lindo (USA) and Leslie Reifer (WI)
Player of the match: Sushant Modani (USA)

- United Arab Emirates won the toss and elected to bat.
- Rahul Bhatia (UAE) made his ODI debut.

=== 5th ODI ===
3 June 2022
10:30
Scorecard

Scotland; 171 (50 overs)	v	United Arab Emirates; 172/5 (44.1 overs)
Safyaan Sharif 30 (48); Kashif Daud 2/24 (7 overs)		Vriitya Aravind 54 (98); Safyaan Sharif 2/37 (8 overs)

United Arab Emirates won by 5 wickets
Moosa Stadium, Pearland
Umpires: Sameer Bandekar (USA) and Vijaya Mallela (USA)
Player of the match: Vriitya Aravind (UAE)

- Scotland won the toss and elected to bat.
- Oliver Davidson (Sco) made his ODI debut.

=== 6th ODI ===
4 June 2022
10:30
Scorecard

United States; 198 (46.3 overs)	v	United Arab Emirates; 200/2 (40.1 overs)
Aaron Jones 87 (112); Zawar Farid 4/30 (6.3 overs)		Vriitya Aravind 102* (108); Steven Taylor 1/20 (5 overs)

United Arab Emirates won by 8 wickets
Moosa Stadium, Pearland
Umpires: Jermaine Lindo (USA) and Leslie Reifer (WI)
Player of the match: Vriitya Aravind (UAE)

- United Arab Emirates won the toss and elected to field.
- Rahul Jariwala (USA) made his ODI debut.
