= Irish cricket team in the United Arab Emirates in 2020–21 =

International cricket tour

Irish cricket team in the UAE in 2020–21
	United Arab Emirates	Ireland
- Dates: 8 – 18 January 2021
Captains	Ahmed Raza	Andrew Balbirnie

One Day International series
- Results: 4-match series drawn 1–1
Most runs	Chundangapoyil Rizwan (110)	Paul Stirling (135)
Most wickets	Ahmed Raza (3); Zahoor Khan (3)	Simi Singh (5)
- Player of the series: Curtis Campher (Ire)

The Ireland cricket team toured the United Arab Emirates in January 2021 to play four One Day International (ODI) matches between 8 and 18 January 2021. The matches served as preparation for Ireland's World Cup Super League fixtures against Afghanistan in the UAE.

In the first fixture, the UAE won by six wickets to record their first win against Ireland in an ODI match. The second match of the series was originally scheduled to take place on 10 January 2021. However, following a positive test for COVID-19 within the UAE team, the match was rescheduled for 16 January 2021. Two UAE cricketers had also tested positive ahead of the first ODI match. On 11 January 2021, a fourth positive case was reported in the UAE squad. The Emirates Cricket Board (ECB) issued a statement saying that the match scheduled to take place on 12 January 2021 had been suspended.

On 13 January 2021, the ECB issued a further statement saying that the third ODI, scheduled to be played the following day, had also been suspended. No new COVID-19 cases had been reported, and the ECB and Cricket Ireland were continuing their discussions with regard to rescheduling the affected matches. Despite no new cases, the fourth match was suspended on 15 January 2021. Both cricket boards were looking at the possibility of playing a match on 18 January 2021. On 17 January 2021, it was confirmed that a second ODI match would be played the following day. Ireland won the rescheduled ODI by 112 runs, therefore drawing the series 1–1.

== Squads ==
ODIs
United Arab Emirates	Ireland
Ahmed Raza (c); Chirag Suri (vc); Waheed Ahmed; Vriitya Aravind; Mohammad Boota; Kashif Daud; Zawar Farid; Basil Hameed; Zahoor Khan; Aryan Lakra; Karthik Meiyappan; Rohan Mustafa; Chundangapoyil Rizwan; Alishan Sharafu; Adhitya Shetty; Junaid Siddique; Muhammad Usman	Andrew Balbirnie (c); Paul Stirling (vc); Mark Adair; Curtis Campher; ~~David Delany~~; Gareth Delany; Shane Getkate; Josh Little; Andy McBrine; Barry McCarthy; James McCollum; Kevin O'Brien; Conor Olphert; Neil Rock (wk); Simi Singh; Harry Tector; Lorcan Tucker (wk); Craig Young

On 28 December 2020, the Emirates Cricket Board (ECB) announced a 19-man training squad in preparation for the series. The ECB announced their squad for the series on 6 January 2021. David Delany was ruled out of the series due to a knee injury, with Josh Little joining Ireland's squad. Little was originally named in the team, but had to self-isolate after a positive COVID-19 result from a close contact. On 11 January 2021, Shane Getkate was added to Ireland's squad, as a replacement for David Delany, and Conor Olphert was added to their squad as a net bowler.

Two UAE players, Chirag Suri and Aryan Lakra, tested positive for COVID-19 ahead of the series, and were both ruled out of the first ODI match. On 9 January 2021, Alishan Sharafu became the third UAE player to test positive for COVID-19, resulting in the second ODI match being rescheduled.

== ODI series ==
=== 1st ODI ===
8 January 2021
09:30
Scorecard

Ireland; 269/5 (50 overs)	v	United Arab Emirates; 270/4 (49 overs)
Paul Stirling 131* (148); Rohan Mustafa 2/43 (10 overs)		Chundangapoyil Rizwan 109 (136); Curtis Campher 2/31 (10 overs)

United Arab Emirates won by 6 wickets
Sheikh Zayed Cricket Stadium, Abu Dhabi
Umpires: Akbar Ali (UAE) and Rahul Asher (Oma)
Player of the match: Chundangapoyil Rizwan (UAE)

- Ireland won the toss and elected to bat.
- Kashif Daud and Alishan Sharafu (UAE) both made their ODI debuts.
- Paul Stirling scored his 10th century in ODIs, and became the second Irish batsman to score 9,000 international runs.
- Chundangapoyil Rizwan and Muhammad Usman (UAE) both scored their first centuries in ODIs. Their partnership of 184 was the highest partnership for any wicket for the United Arab Emirates in ODIs.

=== 2nd ODI ===
12 January 2021
09:30
Scorecard

United Arab Emirates	v	Ireland

Match cancelled
Sheikh Zayed Cricket Stadium, Abu Dhabi
Umpires: Iftikhar Ali (UAE) and Rahul Asher (Oma)

=== 3rd ODI ===
14 January 2021
09:30
Scorecard

United Arab Emirates	v	Ireland

Match cancelled
Sheikh Zayed Cricket Stadium, Abu Dhabi
Umpires: Akbar Ali (UAE) and Rahul Asher (Oma)

=== 4th ODI ===
18 January 2021
09:30
Scorecard

Ireland; 228/6 (50 overs)	v	United Arab Emirates; 116 (36 overs)
Curtis Campher 56 (72); Zahoor Khan 3/35 (8 overs)		Zawar Farid 28 (32); Simi Singh 5/10 (10 overs)

Ireland won by 112 runs
Sheikh Zayed Cricket Stadium, Abu Dhabi
Umpires: Ahmed Shah Pakteen (Afg) and Bismillah Jan Shinwari (Afg)
Player of the match: Simi Singh (Ire)

- United Arab Emirates won the toss and elected to field.
- Kevin O'Brien (Ire) played in his 150th ODI.
- Simi Singh (Ire) took his first five-wicket haul in ODIs.
