= 2022 Scotland Tri-Nation Series (August) =

Cricket tournament

- Part of 2019–2023 ICC Cricket World Cup League 2
- Date: 10–17 August 2022
- Location: Scotland
Teams
Scotland	United Arab Emirates	United States
Captains
Matthew Cross	Ahmed Raza	Monank Patel
Most runs
Calum MacLeod (403)	Vriitya Aravind (107)	Aaron Jones (236)
Most wickets
Mark Watt (11)	Zahoor Khan (6)	Saurabh Netravalkar (6)

The 2022 Scotland Tri-Nation Series was the 15th round of the 2019–2023 ICC Cricket World Cup League 2 cricket tournament that took place in Scotland in August 2022. It was a tri-nation series involving Scotland, the United Arab Emirates and the United States cricket teams, with the matches played as One Day International (ODI) fixtures. The ICC Cricket World Cup League 2 forms part of the qualification pathway to the 2023 Cricket World Cup. In June 2022, Cricket Scotland confirmed the fixtures for the series.

== Squads ==
Scotland	United Arab Emirates	United States
Matthew Cross (c, wk); Kyle Coetzer; Chris Greaves; Michael Jones; Michael Leask; Calum MacLeod; Gavin Main; Christopher McBride; Adrian Neill; Safyaan Sharif; Chris Sole; Hamza Tahir; Craig Wallace; Mark Watt	Ahmed Raza (c); Sabir Ali; Vriitya Aravind; Kashif Daud; Zawar Farid; Basil Hameed; Zahoor Khan; Aryan Lakra; Karthik Meiyappan; Rohan Mustafa; Chundangapoyil Rizwan; Alishan Sharafu; Junaid Siddique; Chirag Suri; Muhammad Waseem	Monank Patel (c); Ian Holland; Aaron Jones; Nosthush Kenjige; Jaskaran Malhotra; Sushant Modani; Yasir Mohammad; Saiteja Mukkamalla; Saurabh Netravalkar; Nisarg Patel; Gajanand Singh; Jasdeep Singh; Cameron Stevenson; Steven Taylor

== Fixtures ==
=== 1st ODI ===
10 August 2022
11:00
Scorecard

Scotland; 262 (48.5 overs)	v	United Arab Emirates; 198 (41.5 overs)
Calum MacLeod 76 (88); Zahoor Khan 4/39 (9.5 overs)		Rohan Mustafa 65* (102); Mark Watt 4/30 (8.5 overs)

Scotland won by 64 runs
Mannofield Park, Aberdeen
Umpires: Mike Burns (Eng) and Allan Haggo (Sco)
Player of the match: Calum MacLeod (Sco)

- Scotland won the toss and elected to bat.
- Sabir Ali (UAE) made his ODI debut.

=== 2nd ODI ===
11 August 2022
11:00
Scorecard

United Arab Emirates; 253/8 (50 overs)	v	United States; 256/9 (49.1 overs)
Aryan Lakra 84 (112); Saurabh Netravalkar 3/44 (10 overs)		Monank Patel 85 (98); Rohan Mustafa 2/43 (10 overs)

United States won by 1 wicket
Mannofield Park, Aberdeen
Umpires: David McLean (Sco) and Ryan Milne (Sco)
Player of the match: Monank Patel (USA)

- United Arab Emirates won the toss and elected to bat.
- Aryan Lakra (UAE) made his ODI debut.

=== 3rd ODI ===
13 August 2022
11:00
Scorecard

United States; 295/8 (50 overs)	v	Scotland; 301/5 (47.4 overs)
Aaron Jones 123* (87); Mark Watt 2/39 (10 overs)		Calum MacLeod 117 (91); Nosthush Kenjige 2/40 (10 overs)

Scotland won by 5 wickets
Mannofield Park, Aberdeen
Umpires: Mike Burns (Eng) and Allan Haggo (Sco)
Player of the match: Calum MacLeod (Sco)

- Scotland won the toss and elected to field.
- Aaron Jones (USA) scored his first century in ODIs.

=== 4th ODI ===
14 August 2022
11:00
Scorecard

Scotland; 254/9 (50 overs)	v	United Arab Emirates; 168 (41 overs)
Matthew Cross 85 (92); Ahmed Raza 2/39 (10 overs)		Vriitya Aravind 50 (85); Mark Watt 5/33 (10 overs)

Scotland won by 86 runs
Mannofield Park, Aberdeen
Umpires: Mike Burns (Eng) and David McLean (Sco)
Player of the match: Mark Watt (Sco)

- United Arab Emirates won the toss and elected to field.

=== 5th ODI ===
16 August 2022
11:00
Scorecard

United Arab Emirates	v	United States

Match abandoned
Mannofield Park, Aberdeen
Umpires: Allan Haggo (Sco) and Ryan Milne (Sco)

- No toss.
- No play was possible due to rain.

=== 6th ODI ===
17 August 2022
11:00
Scorecard

Scotland; 249/8 (50 overs)	v	United States; 250/8 (49.5 overs)
Calum MacLeod 133* (144); Ian Holland 3/28 (10 overs)		Aaron Jones 62 (87); Hamza Tahir 2/37 (10 overs)

United States won by 2 wickets
Mannofield Park, Aberdeen
Umpires: Mike Burns (Eng) and David McLean (Sco)
Player of the match: Calum MacLeod (Sco)

- United States won the toss and elected to field.
