= Namibian cricket team in the United Arab Emirates in 2022–23 =

International cricket tour

| | United Arab Emirates | Namibia |
- Dates: 23 – 25 February 2023
| Captains | Chundangapoyil Rizwan | Gerhard Erasmus |

One Day International series
- Results: 2-match series drawn 1–1
| Most runs | Chundangapoyil Rizwan (71) | Michael van Lingen (86) |
| Most wickets | Zahoor Khan (4) | Tangeni Lungameni (6) |

The Namibia men's cricket team toured the United Arab Emirates in February 2023 to play two One Day International (ODI) matches. The fixtures formed part of the 2019–2023 ICC Cricket World Cup League 2 tournament, and were arranged to make up for matches between the two sides that were previously postponed during the eighth round of the competition.

== Squads ==
| United Arab Emirates | Namibia |
|---|---|
| Chundangapoyil Rizwan (c); Sabir Ali; Vriitya Aravind (wk); Rahul Bhatia; Hazrat Bilal; Aayan Afzal Khan; Asif Khan; Zahoor Khan; Karthik Meiyappan; Rohan Mustafa; Alishan Sharafu; Junaid Siddique; Chirag Suri; Muhammad Waseem | Gerhard Erasmus (c); Karl Birkenstock; Shaun Fouché; Jan Frylinck; Zane Green (wk); Joshuan Julius; Jan Nicol Loftie-Eaton; Lo-handre Louwrens (wk); Tangeni Lungameni; Bernard Scholtz; Ben Shikongo; Ruben Trumpelmann; Michael van Lingen; Pikky Ya France |

== ODI series ==
=== 1st ODI ===
23 February 2023
10:00
Scorecard

| Namibia; 91 (31.1 overs) | v | United Arab Emirates; 95/9 (33 overs) |
| Ruben Trumpelmann 30 (41); Karthik Meiyappan 3/16 (3.1 overs) | | Aayan Afzal Khan 35* (54); Tangeni Lungameni 4/20 (10 overs) |

United Arab Emirates won by 1 wicket
Dubai International Cricket Stadium, Dubai
Umpires: Akbar Ali (UAE) and Bismillah Jan Shinwari (Afg)
Player of the match: Aayan Afzal Khan (UAE)

- United Arab Emirates won the toss and elected to field.

=== 2nd ODI ===
25 February 2023
10:00
Scorecard

| United Arab Emirates; 166/9 (50 overs) | v | Namibia; 167/3 (28.2 overs) |
| Chundangapoyil Rizwan 60* (140); Gerhard Erasmus 2/23 (6 overs) | | Michael van Lingen 71* (53); Zahoor Khan 1/29 (7 overs) |

Namibia won by 7 wickets
Dubai International Cricket Stadium, Dubai
Umpires: Lyndon Hannibal (SL) and Bismillah Jan Shinwari (Afg)
Player of the match: Michael van Lingen (Nam)

- Namibia won the toss and elected to field.
