= Emirati cricket team in Oman in 2021–22 =

International cricket tour

	Oman	United Arab Emirates
- Dates: 5 – 8 February 2022
Captains	Zeeshan Maqsood	Ahmed Raza

One Day International series
- Results: United Arab Emirates won the 3-match series 2–0
Most runs	Jatinder Singh (149)	Chirag Suri (165)
Most wickets	Kaleemullah (6); Bilal Khan (6)	Basil Hameed (7)

The United Arab Emirates cricket team toured Oman in February 2022 to play three One Day International (ODI) matches at the Oman Cricket Academy Ground in Muscat. The fixtures formed part of the 2019–2023 ICC Cricket World Cup League 2 tournament, and were arranged to make up for matches between the two sides that were previously postponed during the fourth and eighth rounds of the competition.

Oman's Jatinder Singh (106) scored a century in the first match, but Chirag Suri (115) led the visitors to a four-wicket victory. The second match was also won by the UAE, again by four wickets, with Basil Hameed taking a five-wicket haul. The third and final match ended as a tie, with the UAE winning the series 2–0.

After the ODI series, both sides participated in a Twenty20 International (T20I) quadrangular series and the T20 World Cup Global Qualifier A.

== Squads ==
Oman	United Arab Emirates
Zeeshan Maqsood (c); Khawar Ali; Wasim Ali; Nestor Dhamba; Sandeep Goud; Aamir Kaleem; Kaleemullah; Ayaan Khan; Bilal Khan; Shoaib Khan; Naseem Khushi (wk); Suraj Kumar (wk); Mohammad Nadeem; Kashyap Prajapati; Jatinder Singh	Ahmed Raza (c); Vriitya Aravind (wk); Kashif Daud; Zawar Farid; Basil Hameed; Zahoor Khan; Karthik Meiyappan; Rohan Mustafa; Akif Raja; Chundangapoyil Rizwan; Junaid Siddique; Chirag Suri; Muhammad Usman; Muhammad Waseem

== ODI series ==
=== 1st ODI ===
5 February 2022
09:30
Scorecard

Oman; 307/9 (50 overs)	v	United Arab Emirates; 308/6 (49 overs)
Jatinder Singh 106 (95); Zahoor Khan 2/59 (10 overs)		Chirag Suri 115 (125); Kaleemullah 3/43 (10 overs)

United Arab Emirates won by 4 wickets
Oman Cricket Academy Ground Turf 1, Muscat
Umpires: Vinod Babu (Oma) and Adrian Holdstock (SA)
Player of the match: Chirag Suri (UAE)

- United Arab Emirates won the toss and elected to field.
- Muhammad Waseem (UAE) made his ODI debut.
- Chirag Suri (UAE) scored his first century in ODIs.

=== 2nd ODI ===
6 February 2022
09:30
Scorecard

Oman; 195 (47.2 overs)	v	United Arab Emirates; 196/6 (45.3 overs)
Shoaib Khan 68 (59); Basil Hameed 5/17 (6.2 overs)		Chundangapoyil Rizwan 76* (116); Bilal Khan 3/47 (9.3 overs)

United Arab Emirates won by 4 wickets
Oman Cricket Academy Ground Turf 1, Muscat
Umpires: Akbar Ali (UAE) and Adrian Holdstock (SA)
Player of the match: Basil Hameed (UAE)

- United Arab Emirates won the toss and elected to field.
- Akif Raja (UAE) made his ODI debut.
- Basil Hameed (UAE) took his first five-wicket haul in ODIs.

=== 3rd ODI ===
8 February 2022
09:30
Scorecard

Oman; 214 (49.3 overs)	v	United Arab Emirates; 214 (50 overs)
Kashyap Prajapati 57 (89); Kashif Daud 3/41 (9.3 overs)		Kashif Daud 52 (52); Nestor Dhamba 3/20 (10 overs)

Match tied
Oman Cricket Academy Ground Turf 1, Muscat
Umpires: Vinod Babu (Oma) and Adrian Holdstock (SA)
Player of the match: Kashif Daud (UAE)

- United Arab Emirates won the toss and elected to field.
