= Nepalese cricket team in the United Arab Emirates in 2018–19 =

International cricket tour

Nepalese cricket team in the UAE in 2018–19
| | United Arab Emirates | Nepal |
- Dates: 25 January – 3 February 2019
| Captains | Mohammad Naveed | Paras Khadka |

One Day International series
- Results: Nepal won the 3-match series 2–1
| Most runs | Shaiman Anwar (98) | Paras Khadka (156) |
| Most wickets | Imran Haider (7) | Sompal Kami (7); Sandeep Lamichhane (7) |

Twenty20 International series
- Results: Nepal won the 3-match series 2–1
| Most runs | Shaiman Anwar (103) | Sundeep Jora (82) |
| Most wickets | Mohammad Naveed (5); Sultan Ahmed (5) | Abinash Bohara (6) |
- Player of the series: Abinash Bohara (Nep)

The Nepal cricket team toured the United Arab Emirates in January and February 2019 to play three One Day Internationals (ODIs) and three Twenty20 International (T20I) matches, with all the fixtures taking place at the ICC Academy Ground in Dubai.

Nepal played their first ever ODI series against the Netherlands in August 2018, drawing the two-match series 1–1. Nepal and the United Arab Emirates also met each other in an ODI later the same month, in the 2018 Asia Cup Qualifier, with the UAE winning by 78 runs. On 1 January 2019, Nepal's head coach Jagat Tamata and captain Paras Khadka named a twenty-man preliminary squad for the tour.

The Emirates Cricket Board (ECB) announced their squad without their regular captain Rohan Mustafa, who was suspended for breaching the ECB's Player's Code of Conduct. Mohammad Naveed replaced him as the UAE captain for the series.

Nepal won the ODI series 2–1, their first-ever ODI series win. In the third match, Nepal's captain, Paras Khadka, scored the first ODI century by a batsman for Nepal. Nepal also won the T20I series 2–1.

== Squads ==
| ODIs | | T20Is | |
| United Arab Emirates | Nepal | United Arab Emirates | Nepal |
|---|---|---|---|
| Mohammad Naveed (c); Muhammad Usman (vc); Ashfaq Ahmed; Qadeer Ahmed; Sultan Ahmed; Shaiman Anwar; Mohammad Boota; Imran Haider; Amir Hayat; Zahoor Khan; Tahir Mughal; Fahad Nawaz; Chundangapoyil Rizwan; Ghulam Shabber; Abdul Shakoor; Chirag Suri | Paras Khadka (c); Gyanendra Malla (vc); Dipendra Singh Airee; Pradeep Airee; Binod Bhandari; Abinash Bohara; Sundeep Jora; Sompal Kami; Karan KC; Sandeep Lamichhane; Rohit Paudel; Lalit Rajbanshi; Basanta Regmi; Pawan Sarraf; Bhim Sharki; Aarif Sheikh | Mohammad Naveed (c); Muhammad Usman (vc); Ashfaq Ahmed; Qadeer Ahmed; Sultan Ahmed; Shaiman Anwar; Mohammad Boota; Imran Haider; Amir Hayat; Zahoor Khan; Fahad Nawaz; Chundangapoyil Rizwan; Ghulam Shabber; Abdul Shakoor; Chirag Suri | Paras Khadka (c); Gyanendra Malla (vc); Dipendra Singh Airee; Pradeep Airee; Binod Bhandari; Abinash Bohara; Sundeep Jora; Sompal Kami; Karan KC; Sandeep Lamichhane; Rohit Paudel; Lalit Rajbanshi; Basanta Regmi; Pawan Sarraf; Bhim Sharki; Aarif Sheikh |

== ODI series ==
=== 1st ODI ===
25 January 2019
09:30
Scorecard

| Nepal; 113 (33.5 overs) | v | United Arab Emirates; 116/7 (32.1 overs) |
| Sompal Kami 30 (47); Amir Hayat 3/19 (7.5 overs) | | Ghulam Shabber 30 (48); Paras Khadka 2/23 (7 overs) |

United Arab Emirates won by 3 wickets
ICC Academy Ground, Dubai
Umpires: Akbar Ali (UAE) and Nitin Menon (Ind)
Player of the match: Amir Hayat (UAE)

- United Arab Emirates won the toss and elected to field.
- Fahad Nawaz (UAE), Binod Bhandari, Lalit Rajbanshi and Pawan Sarraf (Nep) all made their ODI debuts.
- Mohammad Naveed captained the United Arab Emirates for the first time in ODIs.

=== 2nd ODI ===
26 January 2019
09:30
Scorecard

| Nepal; 242/9 (50 overs) | v | United Arab Emirates; 97 (19.3 overs) |
| Rohit Paudel 55 (58); Amir Hayat 3/41 (10 overs) | | Muhammad Usman 26 (39); Sompal Kami 5/33 (6.3 overs) |

Nepal won by 145 runs
ICC Academy Ground, Dubai
Umpires: Iftikhar Ali (UAE) and Nitin Menon (Ind)
Player of the match: Sompal Kami (Nep)

- Nepal won the toss and elected to bat.
- Chundangapoyil Rizwan (UAE) made his ODI debut.
- Rohit Paudel (Nep), at the age of 16 years and 146 days, became the youngest male cricketer to score an international half-century.
- Sompal Kami took the first five-wicket haul by a bowler for Nepal in ODIs.

=== 3rd ODI ===
28 January 2019
09:30
Scorecard

| United Arab Emirates; 254/6 (50 overs) | v | Nepal; 255/6 (44.4 overs) |
| Shaiman Anwar 87 (70); Paras Khadka 2/44 (10 overs) | | Paras Khadka 115 (109); Imran Haider 2/50 (10 overs) |

Nepal won by 4 wickets
ICC Academy Ground, Dubai
Umpires: Iftikhar Ali (UAE) and Nitin Menon (Ind)
Player of the match: Paras Khadka (Nep)

- Nepal won the toss and elected to field.
- Sundeep Jora (Nep) made his ODI debut.
- Paras Khadka became the first batsman for Nepal to score a century in an ODI.

== T20I series ==
=== 1st T20I ===
31 January 2019
13:00
Scorecard

| United Arab Emirates; 153/6 (20 overs) | v | Nepal; 132/7 (20 overs) |
| Shaiman Anwar 59 (38); Basanta Regmi 2/23 (4 overs) | | Sundeep Jora 53* (46); Zahoor Khan 2/17 (4 overs) |

United Arab Emirates won by 21 runs
ICC Academy Ground, Dubai
Umpires: Akbar Ali (UAE) and Iftikhar Ali (UAE)
Player of the match: Shaiman Anwar (UAE)

- Nepal won the toss and elected to field.
- Mohammad Boota, Chundangapoyil Rizwan (UAE), Abinash Bohara, Sundeep Jora and Rohit Paudel (Nep) all made their T20I debuts.
- Sundeep Jora (Nep), at the age of 17 years and 103 days, became the youngest male cricketer to score a half-century in a T20I.

=== 2nd T20I ===
1 February 2019
13:00
Scorecard

| United Arab Emirates; 107 (19.2 overs) | v | Nepal; 111/6 (19.3 overs) |
| Chundangapoyil Rizwan 44 (43); Abinash Bohara 3/20 (4 overs) | | Dipendra Singh Airee 47* (41); Sultan Ahmed 2/9 (4 overs) |

Nepal won by 4 wickets
ICC Academy Ground, Dubai
Umpires: Iftikhar Ali (UAE) and Shiju Sam (UAE)
Player of the match: Dipendra Singh Airee (Nep)

- United Arab Emirates won the toss and elected to bat.
- Pawan Sarraf (Nep) made his T20I debut.

=== 3rd T20I ===
3 February 2019
13:00
Scorecard

| Nepal; 104/8 (10 overs) | v | United Arab Emirates; 90/8 (10 overs) |
| Paras Khadka 29 (14); Mohammad Naveed 2/6 (2 overs) | | Shaiman Anwar 30 (20); Karan KC 2/13 (2 overs) |

Nepal won by 14 runs
ICC Academy Ground, Dubai
Umpires: Akbar Ali (UAE) and Shiju Sam (UAE)
Player of the match: Karan KC (Nep)

- United Arab Emirates won the toss and elected to field.
- The match was reduced to 10 overs per side due to rain.
