= 2019 United Arab Emirates Tri-Nation Series =

Cricket tournament

- Part of 2019–2023 ICC Cricket World Cup League 2
- Date: 8–15 December 2019
- Location: United Arab Emirates
Teams
Scotland	United Arab Emirates	United States
Captains
Kyle Coetzer	Ahmed Raza	Saurabh Netravalkar
Most runs
Calum MacLeod (165)	Basil Hameed (126)	Aaron Jones (215)
Most wickets
Mark Watt (7)	Junaid Siddique (8)	Saurabh Netravalkar (10)

The 2019 United Arab Emirates Tri-Nation Series was the third round of the 2019–2023 ICC Cricket World Cup League 2 cricket tournament and took place in the United Arab Emirates in December 2019. It was a tri-nation series featuring Scotland, the United Arab Emirates and the United States cricket teams, with the matches played as One Day International (ODI) fixtures. The ICC Cricket World Cup League 2 formed part of the qualification pathway to the 2023 Cricket World Cup. The International Cricket Council (ICC) confirmed the fixtures for the tri-series in November 2019.

The United Arab Emirates named a squad for the opening match of the series that included six cricketers who had not played in an ODI match before. The UAE were forced to make changes to their side, following a corruption investigation that impacted the team during the 2019 ICC Men's T20 World Cup Qualifier. As a result of the enforced changes, in the opening match the UAE fielded a team with the youngest average age for their national team, including players skipping school to make their debut.

G. S. Lakshmi was named as the match referee for the opening fixture of the series, becoming the first woman to oversee a men's ODI match.

The United States won their first three matches. The third ODI between the UAE and Scotland was washed out.

== Squads ==
Scotland	United Arab Emirates	United States
Kyle Coetzer (c); Richie Berrington; Dylan Budge; Matthew Cross; Josh Davey; Alasdair Evans; Michael Jones; Calum MacLeod; George Munsey; Safyaan Sharif; Hamza Tahir; Craig Wallace; Mark Watt; Stuart Whittingham	Ahmed Raza (c); Waheed Ahmed; Vriitya Aravind (wk); Darius D'Silva; Zawar Farid; Jonathan Figy; Basil Hameed; Zahoor Khan; Karthik Meiyappan; Rohan Mustafa; Chundangapoyil Rizwan; Junaid Siddique; Chirag Suri; Muhammad Usman	Saurabh Netravalkar (c); Steven Taylor (vc); Karima Gore; Ian Holland; Akshay Homraj; Elmore Hutchinson; Aaron Jones; Nosthush Kenjige; Xavier Marshall; Monank Patel; Nisarg Patel; Timil Patel; Cameron Stevenson; Rusty Theron

== Fixtures ==
=== 1st ODI ===
8 December 2019
10:00
Scorecard

United Arab Emirates; 202 (45.2 overs)	v	United States; 206/7 (45.2 overs)
Muhammad Usman 59* (71); Saurabh Netravalkar 5/32 (9.2 overs)		Aaron Jones 95 (114); Junaid Siddique 3/37 (9 overs)

United States won by 3 wickets
Sharjah Cricket Stadium, Sharjah
Umpires: Ahsan Raza (Pak) and Shiju Sam (UAE)
Player of the match: Aaron Jones (USA)

- United Arab Emirates won the toss and elected to bat.
- The match was reduced to 47 overs per side due to a wet outfield.
- Waheed Ahmed, Vriitya Aravind, Darius D'Silva, Basil Hameed, Palaniapan Meiyappan, Junaid Siddique (UAE), Ian Holland, Akshay Homraj, Nosthush Kenjige and Cameron Stevenson (USA) all made their ODI debuts.
- Saurabh Netravalkar became the first bowler for the United States to take a five-wicket haul in ODIs.

=== 2nd ODI ===
9 December 2019
10:00
Scorecard

United States; 282/8 (50 overs)	v	Scotland; 247 (47.2 overs)
Monank Patel 82 (102); Mark Watt 4/42 (10 overs)		Calum MacLeod 86 (102); Cameron Stevenson 3/43 (9 overs)

United States won by 35 runs
Sharjah Cricket Stadium, Sharjah
Umpires: Iftikhar Ali (UAE) and Shiju Sam (UAE)
Player of the match: Monank Patel (USA)

- United States won the toss and elected to bat.

=== 3rd ODI ===
11 December 2019
10:00
Scorecard

United Arab Emirates	v	Scotland

Match abandoned
Sharjah Cricket Stadium, Sharjah
Umpires: Ahsan Raza (Pak) and Shiju Sam (UAE)

- No toss.
- No play was possible due to rain.

=== 4th ODI ===
12 December 2019
10:00
Scorecard

United States; 213 (49.5 overs)	v	United Arab Emirates; 115 (33 overs)
Aaron Jones 46 (61); Darius D'Silva 2/20 (7 overs)		Basil Hameed 38 (56); Ian Holland 3/11 (4 overs)

United States won by 98 runs
ICC Academy Ground, Dubai
Umpires: Iftikhar Ali (UAE) and Ahsan Raza (Pak)
Player of the match: Saurabh Netravalkar (USA)

- United Arab Emirates won the toss and elected to field.

=== 5th ODI ===
14 December 2019
10:00
Scorecard

United States; 245/9 (50 overs)	v	Scotland; 246/6 (48.5 overs)
Steven Taylor 56 (81); Mark Watt 3/33 (10 overs)		Calum MacLeod 62 (73); Cameron Stevenson 3/67 (10 overs)

Scotland won by 4 wickets
ICC Academy Ground, Dubai
Umpires: Iftikhar Ali (UAE) and Shiju Sam (UAE)
Player of the match: Josh Davey (Sco)

- Scotland won the toss and elected to field.

=== 6th ODI ===
15 December 2019
10:00
Scorecard

Scotland; 220 (48.3 overs)	v	United Arab Emirates; 224/3 (43.5 overs)
Kyle Coetzer 95 (106); Rohan Mustafa 3/35 (9 overs)		Chirag Suri 67 (73); Dylan Budge 1/21 (5 overs)

United Arab Emirates won by 7 wickets
ICC Academy Ground, Dubai
Umpires: Iftikhar Ali (UAE) and Ahsan Raza (Pak)
Player of the match: Basil Hameed (UAE)

- United Arab Emirates won the toss and elected to field.
- Jonathan Figy (UAE) made his ODI debut.
