= Irish cricket team in the United Arab Emirates in 2016–17 =

International cricket tour

	United Arab Emirates	Ireland
- Dates: 2 – 4 March 2017
Captains	Rohan Mustafa	William Porterfield

One Day International series
- Results: Ireland won the 2-match series 2–0
Most runs	Shaiman Anwar (63)	William Porterfield (176)
Most wickets	Zahoor Khan (7)	George Dockrell (5); Andrew McBrine (5)

The Ireland cricket team toured the United Arab Emirates in March 2017 to play two One Day International (ODI) matches. The matches were in preparation for Ireland's fixtures against Afghanistan in India that immediately followed the series. Ireland won the series 2–0.

== Squads ==
United Arab Emirates	Ireland
Rohan Mustafa (c); Qadeer Ahmed; Shaiman Anwar; Imran Haider; Amjad Javed; Zahoor Khan; Adnan Mufti; Mohammad Naveed; Mohammed Qasim; Ahmed Raza; Ghulam Shabber (wk); Rameez Shahzad; Laxman Sreekumar; Muhammad Usman	William Porterfield (c); Andrew Balbirnie; George Dockrell; Ed Joyce; Jacob Mulder; Tim Murtagh; Andrew McBrine; Barry McCarthy; Kevin O'Brien; Niall O'Brien; Paul Stirling; Stuart Thompson; Gary Wilson; Craig Young

== ODI series ==
=== 1st ODI ===
2 March 2017
Scorecard

Ireland; 270 (49.3 overs)	v	United Arab Emirates; 185 (41.4 overs)
William Porterfield 100 (116); Zahoor Khan 6/34 (6.3 overs)		Ahmed Raza 45 (69); George Dockrell 3/27 (10 overs)

Ireland won by 85 runs
ICC Academy Ground, Dubai
Umpires: Ahsan Raza (Pak) and Iftikhar Ali (UAE)
Player of the match: William Porterfield (Ire)

- United Arab Emirates won the toss and elected to field.
- Zahoor Khan took the best figures by an Emirati bowler in an ODI.

=== 2nd ODI ===
4 March 2017
Scorecard

United Arab Emirates; 202 (47.5 overs)	v	Ireland; 203/2 (41.5 overs)
Shaiman Anwar 48 (65); Andy McBrine 3/42 (10 overs)		William Porterfield 76 (94); Zahoor Khan 1/35 (6 overs)

Ireland won by 8 wickets
ICC Academy Ground, Dubai
Umpires: Ahsan Raza (Pak) and Akbar Ali (UAE)
Player of the match: William Porterfield (Ire)

- United Arab Emirates won the toss and elected to bat.
- Jacob Mulder (Ire) made his ODI debut.
