= 2022 United Arab Emirates Tri-Nation Series =

The 2022 United Arab Emirates Tri-Nation Series can refer to:

- 2022 United Arab Emirates Tri-Nation Series (round 9), a cricket tri-series in March 2022 between Namibia, Oman and the UAE
- 2022 United Arab Emirates Tri-Nation Series (round 10), a cricket tri-series in March 2022 between Nepal, Papua New Guinea and the UAE
