= 2022 Scotland Tri-Nation Series =

The 2022 Scotland Tri-Nation Series can refer to:

- 2022 Scotland Tri-Nation Series (round 14), a cricket tri-series in July 2022 between Namibia, Nepal and Scotland
- 2022 Scotland Tri-Nation Series (round 15), a cricket tri-series in August 2022 between Scotland, the UAE and the United States
