= Adhitya Shetty =

Emirati cricketer

Personal information
- Born: 5 July 2004 (age 22); Kolkata, West Bengal, India
- Batting: Right-handed
- Bowling: Right-arm leg spin
- Role: Bowler

International information
- National side: United Arab Emirates (2023-present)
- Only ODI (cap 104): 6 June 2023 v West Indies
- Source: Cricinfo, 7 June 2023

Adhitya Shetty (born 5 July 2004) is a cricketer who plays for the United Arab Emirates national cricket team. He is a right-arm leg spin bowler.

Shetty won a scholarship to attend the ICC Academy in 2017. In January 2021, aged 16, he was named in the UAE senior squad for an ODI series against Ireland. He was expected to make his international debut during the series, which would have made him the youngest ODI player in UAE history, but two matches were cancelled following an outbreak of COVID-19.

Shetty represented the United Arab Emirates national under-19 cricket team at the 2022 Under-19 Cricket World Cup in the West Indies. He was named man of the match against Uganda after taking 4/29 and hitting the winning runs from tenth in the batting order.

== International career ==
In May 2023, Shetty was named in the UAE national squad for an ODI series against the West Indies. He made his One Day International (ODI) debut for the UAE against the West Indies on 6 June 2023.
