= Pawan Sarraf =

Nepalese cricketer

Personal information
- Born: 17 December 2000 (age 25); Bara, Kalaiya, Nepal
- Batting: Right-handed
- Bowling: Right-arm off break
- Role: All-rounder

International information
- National side: Nepal
- ODI debut (cap 18): 25 January 2019 v UAE
- Last ODI: 16 July 2022 v Namibia
- T20I debut (cap 26): 1 February 2019 v UAE
- Last T20I: 30 August 2022 v Kenya

Career statistics
Competition	ODI	T20I	FC
Matches	12	17	1
Runs scored	72	145	2
Batting average	8.00	10.35	1.00
100s/50s	0/0	0/0	0/0
Top score	15	27*	2
Balls bowled	322	120	54
Wickets	6	3	1
Bowling average	41.83	39.00	64.00
5 wickets in innings	0	0	0
10 wickets in match	0	0	0
Best bowling	2/45	1/3	1/28
Catches/stumpings	4/–	8/–	0/–
Medal record
Representing Nepal
Men's Cricket
South Asian Games
Bronze medal – third place	2019 Kathmandu/Pokhara	Team
- Source: Cricinfo, 26 April 2025

Pawan Sarraf (born 17 December 2000) is a Nepalese cricketer. He made his One Day International (ODI) debut for Nepal against the United Arab Emirates on 25 January 2019.

In January 2019, he was named in Nepal's Twenty20 International (T20I) squad for their series against the United Arab Emirates. He made his T20I debut against the UAE on 1 February 2019. In April 2019, he was named in Nepal's squad for the Asia qualification tournament for the 2020 Under-19 Cricket World Cup. In Nepal's opening match of the tournament, against Singapore, Sarraf took three wickets for five runs and was named the player of the match.

In June 2019, he was named in Nepal's squad for the Regional Finals of the 2018–19 ICC T20 World Cup Asia Qualifier tournament. He made his first-class debut on 6 November 2019, for Nepal against the Marylebone Cricket Club (MCC), during the MCC's tour of Nepal. Later the same month, he was named in Nepal's squads for the 2019 ACC Emerging Teams Asia Cup in Bangladesh, and for the men's cricket tournament at the 2019 South Asian Games. The Nepal team won the bronze medal, after they beat the Maldives by five wickets in the third-place playoff match. In September 2020, he was one of eighteen cricketers to be awarded with a central contract by the Cricket Association of Nepal.
