= Sohaib Khan =

Indian–Emirati cricketer (born 1998)

Mohammad Sohaib Khan
Personal information
- Born: 5 June 1998 (age 28); Gaya, Bihar, India
- Batting: Right-handed
- Role: Batsman

International information
- National side: United Arab Emirates (2025-present)
- ODI debut (cap 120): 28 October 2025 v United States
- Last ODI: 5 November 2025 v Nepal
- T20I debut (cap 95): 16 November 2025 v Oman
- Last T20I: 16 February 2026 v Afghanistan
- T20I shirt no.: 45

Career statistics
Competition	ODI	T20I	T20
Matches	4	5	7
Runs scored	56	140	205
Batting average	14.00	28.00	29.28
100s/50s	0/0	0/2	0/2
Top score	29	68	68
Catches/stumpings	0/0	2/0	2/0
- Source: ESPNcricinfo, 16 February 2026

Mohammad Sohaib Khan (born 5 June 1998) is an Indian-born Emirati cricketer who plays for the United Arab Emirates national cricket team as a right-handed middle-order batter

== Early life and education ==
Sohaib was born on 5 June 1998 in Kothi, a small village in the Gaya district in the Indian state of Bihar. Initially, he started playing tennis-ball cricket at a young age before moving to New Delhi to pursue his education.

He attended Jamia Millia Islamia University, where he studied Sociology and graduated in 2019. It was here that he started playing cricket professionally, taking part in inter-university competitions. He also participated in North Zone tournaments in 2017 and 2018.

In 2021, Sohaib moved to Dubai looking for better opportunities. Until his international debut for the UAE side, he was working as a financial consultant and salesperson at a stock market company called Prospero.

== Personal life ==
In 2021, Sohaib got married and welcomed a daughter, after which he moved to Dubai to support his family amid the economic challenges because of the COVID-19 pandemic.

== Career ==
In October 2025, he was named in UAE's squad for the 15th round of the 2024–2026 CWC League 2. He made his One Day International (ODI) debut against United States on 28 October 2025.

In November 2025, he was named in the UAE's side for the 2025 Asia Cup Rising Stars. He finished as the side's second highest run-scorer in the tournament, with a top score of 63 against India A. He also made his Twenty20 International (T20I) during the tournament against Oman on 16 November 2025.

In January 2026, he was named in the United Arab Emirates squad for the 2026 Men's T20 World Cup. He scored two half centuries in consecutive innings against Canada and Afghanistan in the tournament, with his innings against Canada playing a crucial role in the UAE’s victory.
