= Akif Raja =

Emirati cricketer (born 1992)

Personal information
- Full name: Raja Akifullah Khan
- Born: 24 November 1992 (age 33); Lahore, Punjab, Pakistan
- Batting: Left-handed
- Bowling: Right-arm medium-fast
- Role: Batsman

International information
- National side: United Arab Emirates
- ODI debut (cap 90): 6 February 2022 v Oman
- Last ODI: 4 June 2022 v USA
- T20I debut (cap 57): 8 October 2021 v Ireland
- Last T20I: 21 May 2025 v Bangladesh

Career statistics
Competition	ODI	T20I
Matches	5	19
Runs scored	0	74
Batting average	0.00	37.00
100s/50s	0/0	0/0
Top score	0	28
Balls bowled	228	324
Wickets	3	15
Bowling average	53.33	30.27
5 wickets in innings	0	0
10 wickets in match	0	0
Best bowling	1/19	3/22
Catches/stumpings	2/-	2/–
- Source: Cricinfo, 11 July 2025

Akif Raja (born 24 November 1992) is a Pakistani-born cricketer who plays for the United Arab Emirates national cricket team. He played in one first-class match for Lahore Shalimar in January 2014 in the 2013–14 Quaid-e-Azam Trophy in Pakistan.

In October 2021, he was named in the UAE's Twenty20 International (T20I) squad for the 2021 Summer T20 Bash tournament. He made his T20I debut on 8 October 2021, for the UAE against Ireland. In November 2021, he was named in the UAE's One Day International (ODI) squad for the 2021 Namibia Tri-Nation Series.

In February 2022, Raja was named in the UAE's ODI squad for their series against Oman. He made his ODI debut on 6 February 2022, for the UAE against Oman.

== Personal life ==
Raja was born on 24 November 1992 in Lahore, Pakistan. He is the son of Nasreen Akhtar and Raja Arif Ullah Khan; his father died of COVID-19. He moved to the UAE in 2017, initially working with NMC Health in Abu Dhabi and later with MGM Medical Center in Sharjah.
