= Fahad Nawaz =

Emirati cricketer (born 2000)

Personal information
- Born: 15 January 2000 (age 26); Dubai, United Arab Emirates
- Batting: Right-handed
- Bowling: Left-arm orthodox
- Role: Bowler

International information
- National side: United Arab Emirates
- ODI debut (cap 76): 25 January 2019 v Nepal
- Last ODI: 26 January 2019 v Nepal
- Only T20I (cap 62): 20 October 2022 v Namibia
- Source: Cricinfo, 20 October 2022

Fahad Nawaz (15 January 2000) is a cricketer who plays for the United Arab Emirates national cricket team. He made his One Day International (ODI) debut in a home series against Nepal on 25 January 2019. In December 2020, he was one of ten cricketers to be awarded a year-long part-time contract by the Emirates Cricket Board.

In September 2022, he was named in the UAE squad for the 2022 ICC Men's T20 World Cup. He made his T20I debut on 20 October 2022, against Namibia.
