= Shiju Sam =

Indian-born Emirati cricket umpire

Personal information
- Full name: Shiju Sam Mannil
- Born: 3 January 1978 (age 48); Pandalam, Kerala, India
- Role: Umpire

Umpiring information
- ODIs umpired: 25 (2019–2025)
- T20Is umpired: 56 (2019–2026)
- WODIs umpired: 1 (2021)
- WT20Is umpired: 11 (2022–2023)
- Source: Cricinfo, 16 September 2025

Shiju Sam Mannil (born 3 January 1978) is an Indian-born international cricket umpire based in the United Arab Emirates (UAE). He was named the best umpire at the Shyam Bhatia Awards in Dubai in both 2018 and 2019.

He stood in his first Twenty20 International (T20I) match, between the UAE and Nepal, on 1 February 2019. His first One Day International (ODI) match as an umpire was played by the United Arab Emirates and the United States in the 2019 United Arab Emirates Tri-Nation Series on 8 December 2019.

== See also ==
- List of One Day International cricket umpires
- List of Twenty20 International cricket umpires
