= Aryan Lakra =

Emirati cricketer (born 2001)

Personal information
- Born: 13 December 2001 (age 24); Sonipat, Haryana, India
- Batting: Left-handed
- Bowling: Left-arm orthodox
- Role: All-rounder

International information
- National side: United Arab Emirates
- ODI debut (cap 94): 11 August 2022 v USA
- Last ODI: 1 May 2023 v Nepal
- T20I debut (cap 59): 22 August 2022 v Singapore
- Last T20I: 18 October 2022 v Sri Lanka
- Source: ESPNcricinfo, 4 May 2023

Aryan Lakra (born 13 December 2001) is an Indian-born cricketer who plays for the United Arab Emirates national cricket team. He was named as the captain of the United Arab Emirates squad for the 2020 Under-19 Cricket World Cup. He took twelve wickets in the six matches he played in the tournament.

In December 2020, Lakra was one of ten cricketers to be awarded a year-long part-time contract by the Emirates Cricket Board. In January 2021, he was named in the UAE's One Day International (ODI) squad to play against Ireland. In March 2022, Lakra was named in the UAE's ODI squad for the 2022 United Arab Emirates Tri-Nation Series. In August 2022, he was named in UAE's One Day International (ODI) squad for round 15 of the 2019–2023 ICC Cricket World Cup League 2 in Scotland. Lakra made his ODI debut on 11 August 2022, against the United States. Later the same month, he was named in the UAE T20I squad for the 2022 Asia Cup qualifier. He made his T20I debut on 22 August 2022, against Singapore.
