= Sabir Ali (Emirati cricketer) =

Emirati cricketer (born 1991)

Personal information
- Born: 11 July 1991 (age 35); Lahore, Punjab, Pakistan
- Batting: Right-handed
- Bowling: Left-arm fast-medium
- Role: Bowler

International information
- National side: United Arab Emirates
- ODI debut (cap 93): 10 August 2022 v Scotland
- Last ODI: 5 March 2023 v Papua New Guinea
- T20I debut (cap 60): 22 August 2022 v Singapore
- Last T20I: 27 September 2022 v Bangladesh
- Source: Cricinfo, 17 February 2023

Sabir Ali (born 11 July 1991) is a Pakistani-born cricketer who plays for the United Arab Emirates national cricket team.

== Personal life ==
Ali grew up in Lahore, Pakistan. He moved to the UAE in 2016.

== Career ==
In August 2022, he was named in UAE's One Day International squad for the Tri-Nation series, which was formed part of the 2019–2023 ICC Cricket World Cup League 2. He made his ODI debut for United Arab Emirates against Scotland on 10 August 2022.

In August 2022, he was named in UAE's national squad for the 2022 Asia Cup Qualifier. He made his Twenty20 International (T20I) debut against Singapore on 22 August 2022 in Asia Cup Qualifier.
