= Mohammad Boota =

Emirati cricketer (born 1983)

Personal information
- Full name: Mohammad Boota
- Born: 5 January 1983 (age 43); Sialkot, Pakistan

International information
- National side: United Arab Emirates
- ODI debut (cap 73): 11 January 2018 v Ireland
- Last ODI: 14 April 2019 v Zimbabwe
- T20I debut (cap 43): 31 January 2019 v Nepal
- Last T20I: 19 February 2022 v Germany

Career statistics
Competition	ODI	T20I	LA	T20
Matches	9	19	12	19
Runs scored	191	136	243	136
Batting average	23.87	17.00	24.30	17.00
100s/50s	0/1	0/0	0/1	0/0
Top score	59*	20*	59*	20*
Balls bowled	12	6	12	6
Wickets	0	1	0	1
Bowling average	–	13.00	–	13.00
5 wickets in innings	–	0	–	0
10 wickets in match	–	0	–	0
Best bowling	–	1/13	–	1/13
Catches/stumpings	0/1	4/2	0/1	4/2
- Source: Cricinfo, 23 February 2022

Mohammad Boota (born 5 January 1983) is a Pakistani-born cricketer who plays for the United Arab Emirates national cricket team. He made his List A debut for the United Arab Emirates against Nepal in the 2015–17 ICC World Cricket League Championship on 6 December 2017.

In January 2018, he was named in the United Arab Emirates One Day International (ODI) squad for the tri-series against Ireland and Scotland. He made his ODI debut against Ireland in the tri-series on 11 January 2018. Later the same month, he was named in the United Arab Emirates' squad for the 2018 ICC World Cricket League Division Two tournament.

In December 2018, he was named in the United Arab Emirates' team for the 2018 ACC Emerging Teams Asia Cup. In January 2019, he was named in the United Arab Emirates' Twenty20 International (T20I) squad for their series against Nepal. He made his T20I debut for the United Arab Emirates against Nepal on 31 January 2019.

In September 2019, he was named in the United Arab Emirates' squad for the 2019 ICC T20 World Cup Qualifier tournament in the UAE. In December 2020, he was one of ten cricketers to be awarded with a year-long full-time contract by the Emirates Cricket Board.
