= Iftikhar Ali =

Emirati cricket umpire (born 1957)

Personal information
- Born: 1 January 1957 (age 69); Sialkot, Pakistan
- Role: Umpire

Umpiring information
- ODIs umpired: 9 (2017–2019)
- T20Is umpired: 15 (2016–2021)
- Source: ESPN Cricinfo, 10 October 2021

Iftikhar Ali (born 1 January 1957) is a Pakistani-born international cricket umpire and match referee based in the United Arab Emirates (UAE). He made his international umpiring debut in a Twenty20 International (T20I) match between Ireland and the UAE, on 14 February 2016. He was one of the eight on-field umpires in the 2016 ICC World Cricket League Division Four tournament. He officiated in his first One Day International (ODI) match, between Scotland and Hong Kong, on 22 January 2017.

== See also ==
- List of One Day International cricket umpires
- List of Twenty20 International cricket umpires
