= Kashif Daud =

Pakistani-Emirati cricketer

Personal information
- Born: 10 February 1986 (age 40); Sialkot, Punjab, Pakistan
- Batting: Right-handed
- Bowling: Right-arm medium-fast
- Role: Bowling all-rounder

International information
- National side: United Arab Emirates
- ODI debut (cap 87): 8 January 2021 v Ireland
- Last ODI: 14 August 2022 v Scotland
- T20I debut (cap 54): 5 October 2021 v Namibia
- Last T20I: 18 October 2022 v Sri Lanka

Career statistics
Competition	ODI	T20I	FC	LA
Matches	19	16	33	39
Runs scored	282	101	596	320
Batting average	28.20	12.62	15.28	21.33
100s/50s	0/2	0/0	0/1	0/2
Top score	76*	28*	56*	76*
Balls bowled	663	239	5,504	1,684
Wickets	16	11	126	42
Bowling average	30.12	27.00	24.52	32.73
5 wickets in innings	0	0	11	0
10 wickets in match	0	0	2	0
Best bowling	3/41	4/32	7/30	4/16
Catches/stumpings	3/–	4/–	10/–	7/–
- Source: Cricinfo, 25 October 2022

Kashif Daud (born 10 February 1986) is a Pakistani cricketer who now represents the United Arab Emirates cricket team. In domestic cricket in Pakistan, he played in 33 first-class and 20 List A matches for Sialkot and Zarai Taraqiati Bank Limited. In January 2021, he was named in the UAE's One Day International (ODI) squad to play against Ireland. He made his ODI debut for the UAE, against Ireland, on 8 January 2021.

In October 2021, he was named in the UAE's Twenty20 International (T20I) squad for the 2021 Summer T20 Bash tournament. He made his T20I debut on 5 October 2021, for the UAE against Namibia.

== Personal life ==
Daud was born in Sialkot, Pakistan. He was introduced to UAE cricket by his friend, fellow Sialkoti and UAE national player Mohammed Qasim. In 2016 he moved to the UAE to work as a coach at Sharjah Cricket Stadium.
