= Akbar Ali (umpire) =

Emirati cricket umpire (born 1973)

Personal information
- Born: 20 March 1973 (age 53); Delhi, India
- Nickname: Akbar Khan
- Role: Umpire

Umpiring information
- ODIs umpired: 32 (2017–2025)
- T20Is umpired: 64 (2016–2026)
- WODIs umpired: 3 (2024)
- WT20Is umpired: 23 (2019–2025)
- Source: ESPNcricinfo, 14 September 2025

Akbar Ali (born 20 March 1973) is an Indian-born international cricket umpire based in the United Arab Emirates (UAE). He stood in his first Twenty20 International (T20I) match, between Ireland and the UAE, on 16 February 2016. He was one of the eight umpires for the 2016 World Cricket League Division Four tournament. He officiated in his first One Day International (ODI) match, between Scotland and Hong Kong, on 22 January 2017.

== See also ==
- List of One Day International cricket umpires
- List of Twenty20 International cricket umpires
