= Basil Hameed =

Emirati cricketer

Personal information
- Full name: Basil bin Abdul Hameed
- Born: 15 April 1992 (age 34); Panniyankara, Kerala, India
- Batting: Right-handed
- Bowling: Right-arm off break
- Role: All-rounder

International information
- National side: United Arab Emirates (2019–present)
- ODI debut (cap 80): 8 December 2019 v United States
- Last ODI: 9 November 2024 v Netherlands
- T20I debut (cap 50): 17 August 2023 v New Zealand
- Last T20I: 29 January 2026 v Ireland

Career statistics
| Competition | ODI | T20I | LA | T20 |
|---|---|---|---|---|
| Matches | 48 | 65 | 48 | 74 |
| Runs scored | 1,051 | 796 | 1,051 | 872 |
| Batting average | 24.44 | 21.51 | 24.44 | 19.81 |
| 100s/50s | 0/5 | 0/2 | 0/5 | 0/2 |
| Top score | 71 | 51 | 71 | 51 |
| Balls bowled | 1,378 | 537 | 1,378 | 567 |
| Wickets | 43 | 38 | 43 | 38 |
| Bowling average | 22.25 | 16.84 | 22.25 | 18.36 |
| 5 wickets in innings | 1 | 0 | 1 | 0 |
| 10 wickets in match | 0 | 0 | 0 | 0 |
| Best bowling | 5/17 | 4/25 | 5/17 | 4/25 |
| Catches/stumpings | 18/– | 33/– | 18/– | 34/– |
- Source: ESPNcricinfo, 29 January 2026

Basil bin Abdul Hameed (born 15 April 1992) is an Indian-born-Emirati cricketer who plays for the United Arab Emirates national cricket team. In December 2019, he was named in the One Day International (ODI) squad for the 2019 United Arab Emirates Tri-Nation Series. He made his ODI debut against the United States on 8 December 2019.

In February 2020, Basil was included in the UAE's Twenty20 International (T20I) squad for the 2020 ACC Western Region T20 qualifier tournament. He made his T20I debut against Iran on 23 February 2020. In December 2020, he was one of ten cricketers awarded a year-long part-time contract by the Emirates Cricket Board.

In February 2022, in the second match against Oman, Basil took his first five-wicket haul (5 for 17) in ODI cricket.

== Personal life ==
Basil was born in Panniyankara, Kerala, India. He was "on the verge of playing Ranji Trophy cricket for his native Kerala" before moving to the UAE for work reasons in 2015. As of 2019 he was an assistant sales manager with Al Nabooda Insurance Brokers (ANIB) and also played cricket for the company team in UAE domestic competitions.
