= Alishan Sharafu =

UAE cricketer

Personal information
- Full name: Alishan Sharafu
- Born: 10 January 2003 (age 23); Kanhangad, Kerala, India
- Batting: Right-handed
- Bowling: Right-arm fast-medium
- Role: Batting all-rounder

International information
- National side: United Arab Emirates (2020–present)
- ODI debut (cap 88): 8 January 2021 v Ireland
- Last ODI: 5 November 2025 v Nepal
- T20I debut (cap 51): 23 February 2020 v Iran
- Last T20I: 16 November 2025 v Nepal

Career statistics
Competition	ODI	T20I	LA	T20
Matches	28	63	28	97
Runs scored	433	1,650	433	2,299
Batting average	16.65	33.00	16.65	29.47
100s/50s	0/1	0/13	0/1	0/15
Top score	58	90*	58	90*
Catches/stumpings	14/–	28/–	14/–	40/–
- Source: ESPNcricinfo, 1 January 2026

Alishan Sharafu (Malayalam: അലിഷാൻ ഷറഫു; born 10 January 2003) is a cricketer who plays for the United Arab Emirates national cricket team and Abu Dhabi Knight Riders in the International League T20 (ILT20).

== Early life and education ==
Alishan Sharafu was born on 10 January 2003 in Kanhangad, Kerala, India. He spent his early life in the UAE. His interest in cricket began during childhood visits to Kanhangad and Ramanthali in the Kannur district of Kerala, India, and India's win in the 2011 Cricket World Cup inspired him to play cricket as a professional.

Sharafu holds a bachelor's degree in cybersecurity.

== Career ==
Sharafu represented the UAE at the Under-16 and Under-19 levels, beginning at age 15.

In 2020, Sharafu was named in the United Arab Emirates squad for the 2020 Under-19 Cricket World Cup. In their plate semi-final match against Nigeria, Sharafu scored an unbeaten 59 runs and was named the man of the match. He made his Twenty20 International (T20I) debut on 23 February 2020, against Iran, in the 2020 ACC Western Region T20 tournament.

In December 2020, Sharafu was one of ten cricketers to be awarded a year-long part-time contract by the Emirates Cricket Board. In January 2021, he was named in the UAE's One Day International (ODI) squad to play against Ireland. He made his ODI debut against Ireland, on 8 January 2021. However, the following day he tested positive for COVID-19, resulting in the next ODI match being rescheduled.

In January 2022, Sharafu was named as the captain of the UAE team for the 2022 ICC Under-19 Cricket World Cup in the West Indies.

In 2024, Sharafu joined the Abu Dhabi Knight Riders after being identified at a trial and played in the ILT20.

In January 2026, Sharafu was named in UAE's squad for the 2026 T20 World Cup.
