= Karthik Meiyappan =

Emirati cricketer

Personal information
- Full name: Karthik Palaniapan Meiyappan
- Born: 8 October 2000 (age 26); Chennai, Tamil Nadu, India
- Batting: Right-handed
- Bowling: Right-arm leg spin
- Role: Bowler

International information
- National side: United Arab Emirates
- ODI debut (cap 83): 8 December 2019 v United States
- Last ODI: 9 June 2023 v West Indies
- T20I debut (cap 58): 8 October 2021 v Ireland
- Last T20I: 20 October 2022 v Namibia

Career statistics
Competition	ODI	T20I
Matches	25	14
Runs scored	122	19
Batting average	8.13	9.50
100s/50s	0/0	0/0
Top score	24	12
Balls bowled	1028	288
Wickets	36	22
Bowling average	25.38	15.22
5 wickets in innings	0	0
10 wickets in match	0	0
Best bowling	4/37	4/25
Catches/stumpings	2/–	4/–
- Source: ESPNcricinfo, 10 June 2023

Karthik Palaniapan Meiyappan (born 8 October 2000) is an Indian-born cricketer who played for the United Arab Emirates national cricket team as a right-arm leg spin bowler. He made his One Day International (ODI) debut for the UAE in 2019 and also represented the UAE at the 2020 Under-19 Cricket World Cup. Meiyappan made history being the first ever UAE player to take a hat-trick; that hat-trick was also the first by a UAE player in a T20 World Cup, and the first by an ICC associate member against an ICC full member.

== Personal life ==
Meiyappan was born in Chennai, India. He grew up in Chennai, Abu Dhabi and Dubai, before his family settled in Dubai permanently in 2012. He attended The Winchester School, Jebel Ali, alongside his UAE teammate Aryan Lakra.

== Career ==
Meiyappan captained the United Arab Emirates national under-19 cricket team at the 2019 ACC Under-19 Asia Cup in Sri Lanka, having also played at the 2018 ACC Under-19 Asia Cup in Bangladesh.

In December 2019, he was named in the One Day International (ODI) squad for the 2019 United Arab Emirates Tri-Nation Series. He made his ODI, against the United States on 8 December 2019. Later the same month, he was named in the UAE's squad for the 2020 Under-19 Cricket World Cup. In December 2020, he was one of ten cricketers awarded a year-long part-time contract by the Emirates Cricket Board.

In October 2021, he was named in the UAE's Twenty20 International (T20I) squad for the 2021 Summer T20 Bash tournament. He made his T20I debut on 8 October 2021, for the UAE against Ireland.

He was named in UAE's squad for the 2022 ICC Men's T20 World Cup in Australia. In his team's second match of the group stage of the tournament against Sri Lanka, he took a hat-trick by dismissing Bhanuka Rajapaksa, Charith Asalanka, and Sri Lankan captain Dasun Shanaka. This was the first T20I hat-trick by a UAE player, the fifth at a T20 World Cup, and the first by a player from an ICC associate member against an ICC full member.
