= Junaid Siddique (United Arab Emirates cricketer) =

Emirati cricketer

Personal information
- Full name: Muhammad Junaid Siddique
- Born: 6 December 1992 (age 33); Multan, Punjab, Pakistan
- Batting: Right-handed
- Bowling: Right-arm medium fast
- Role: Bowler

International information
- National side: United Arab Emirates
- ODI debut (cap 82): 8 December 2019 v United States
- Last ODI: 1 May 2023 v Nepal
- T20I debut (cap 48): 18 October 2019 v Oman
- Last T20I: 3 November 2023 v Nepal

Career statistics
Competition	ODI	T20I
Matches	38	28
Runs scored	87	54
Batting average	5.89	7.71
100s/50s	0/0	0/0
Top score	16*	18
Balls bowled	1694	602
Wickets	52	33
Bowling average	27.46	22.75
5 wickets in innings	0	0
10 wickets in match	0	0
Best bowling	4/23	4/12
Catches/stumpings	4/–	8/–
- Source: Cricinfo, 10 June 2023

Junaid Siddique (born 6 December 1992) is a Pakistani-born cricketer who plays for the United Arab Emirates national cricket team. Siddique was born in Multan, Pakistan. He moved to the UAE in 2014.

== International career ==
In October 2019, he was added to the UAE squad for the 2019 ICC T20 World Cup Qualifier tournament in the UAE. He made his Twenty20 International (T20I) debut for the UAE, against Oman, on 18 October 2019. In December 2019, he was named in the One Day International (ODI) squad for the 2019 United Arab Emirates Tri-Nation Series. He made his ODI debut against the United States on 8 December 2019. In December 2020, Siddique was one of ten cricketers to be awarded a year-long full-time contract by the Emirates Cricket Board.

In January 2026, Siddique was named in UAE's squad for the 2026 T20 World Cup.
