= Chundangapoyil Rizwan =

Emirati cricketer

Personal information
- Full name: Chundangapoyil Rizwan
- Born: 19 April 1988 (age 38); Thalassery, Kerala, India
- Batting: Right-handed
- Bowling: Legbreak googly
- Role: Batsman

International information
- National side: United Arab Emirates
- ODI debut (cap 77): 26 January 2019 v Nepal
- Last ODI: 16 March 2023 v Nepal
- T20I debut (cap 44): 31 January 2019 v Nepal
- Last T20I: 19 February 2023 v Afghanistan

Career statistics
| Competition | ODI | T20I |
|---|---|---|
| Matches | 29 | 15 |
| Runs scored | 736 | 263 |
| Batting average | 32.00 | 23.90 |
| 100s/50s | 1/3 | 0/1 |
| Top score | 109 | 51 |
| Balls bowled | 46 | – |
| Wickets | 1 | – |
| Bowling average | 39.00 | – |
| 5 wickets in innings | 0 | – |
| 10 wickets in match | 0 | – |
| Best bowling | 1/19 | – |
| Catches/stumpings | 6/– | 3/– |
- Source: ESPNcricinfo, 18 March 2023

Chundangapoyil Puthiyapurayil Rizwan (19 April 1988) is an Indian-born cricketer who plays for the United Arab Emirates national cricket team. He has played for the UAE national cricket team since 2019, and was appointed Twenty20 International captain in 2022.

== International career ==
He made his One Day International (ODI) debut for the United Arab Emirates against Nepal on 26 January 2019. In January 2019, he was named in the UAE Twenty20 International (T20I) squad for their series against Nepal. He made his T20I debut against Nepal on 31 January 2019.

In December 2020, he was one of ten cricketers to be awarded a year-long part-time contract by the Emirates Cricket Board. The following month, in the UAE's first fixture against Ireland, Rizwan scored his first century in an ODI match.

In August 2022, Rizwan was appointed to succeeded Ahmed Raza as the UAE's Twenty20 International captain, with his first major tournament being the 2022 Asia Cup Qualifier in Oman.

== Personal life ==
Rizwan was born in Tellicherry, Kerala, India. His father moved to the UAE in the 1980s, and when he was two years old the family moved to Sharjah, where his younger sisters were born. Rizwan later returned to India to study engineering in Kochi, playing cricket for Kerala at the under-19, and under-23 levels. He moved back to the UAE in 2014 to work, as an electrical engineer, with Bukhatir Group.
