= Vriitya Aravind =

Emirati cricketer

Personal information
- Full name: Vriitya Rudhravel Sasirekha Aravind
- Born: 11 June 2002 (age 24); Chennai, Tamil Nadu, India
- Batting: Right-handed
- Role: Wicket-keeper batsman

International information
- National side: United Arab Emirates
- ODI debut (cap 79): 8 December 2019 v United States
- Last ODI: 9 June 2023 v West Indies
- T20I debut (cap 49): 23 February 2020 v Iran
- Last T20I: 3 November 2023 v Nepal

Career statistics
Competition	ODI	T20I
Matches	49	28
Runs scored	1536	650
Batting average	33.39	30.95
100s/50s	2/8	0/3
Top score	115*	97*
Catches/stumpings	32/9	15/3
- Source: ESPNcricinfo, 10 June 2023

Vriitya Rudhravel Sasirekha Aravind (born 11 June 2002) is an Indian-born cricketer who plays for the United Arab Emirates national cricket team. He plays as a wicket-keeper batsman for the UAE cricket team. In October 2019, he was added to the UAE's squad for the 2019 ICC T20 World Cup Qualifier tournament, replacing Ghulam Shabber. In December 2019, he was named in the One Day International (ODI) squad for the 2019 United Arab Emirates Tri-Nation Series. Aravind made his ODI debut against the United States on 8 December 2019. Later the same month, he was named in the UAE's squad for the 2020 Under-19 Cricket World Cup.

In February 2020, he was named in the UAE's Twenty20 International (T20I) squad for the 2020 ACC Western Region T20 qualifier tournament. He made his T20I debut for the UAE, against Iran, on 23 February 2020.

In March 2022, in the sixth match of the 2022 United Arab Emirates Tri-Nation Series, Aravind scored his first century in ODI cricket, with 115 not out from just 76 balls.

== Personal life ==
Aravind was born in Chennai, India. He studied at Kings School Al Barsha in Dubai. He moved to England in 2020 to attend Loughborough University.
