= Ahmed Raza (Emirati cricketer) =

Emirati cricketer

Personal information
- Born: 10 October 1988 (age 38); Sharjah, United Arab Emirates
- Height: 6 ft 5 in (196 cm)
- Batting: Right handed
- Bowling: Slow left-arm orthodox
- Role: Bowler

International information
- National side: United Arab Emirates (2006-2022)
- ODI debut (cap 41): 1 February 2014 v Scotland
- Last ODI: 18 November 2022 v Nepal
- T20I debut (cap 12): 19 March 2014 v Ireland
- Last T20I: 20 October 2022 v Namibia

Career statistics
Competition	ODI	T20I	FC	LA
Matches	51	54	20	105
Runs scored	382	122	391	737
Batting average	11.57	12.20	13.96	11.69
100s/50s	0/1	0/0	0/0	0/1
Top score	50	22	45	50
Balls bowled	2,747	1,062	4,126	5,400
Wickets	63	37	67	142
Bowling average	29.39	31.59	25.98	24.82
5 wickets in innings	1	1	5	2
10 wickets in match	0	0	0	0
Best bowling	5/26	5/19	7/37	5/26
Catches/stumpings	25/–	19/–	17/–	49/–
- Source: ESPNcricinfo, 29 November 2022

Ahmed Raza (Urdu: احمد رضا; born 10 October 1988) is an international cricketer who plays for the United Arab Emirates national cricket team. Raza is a right-handed batsman who bowls slow left-arm orthodox.

== Personal life ==
Raza was born and raised in Sharjah, the youngest of four siblings. He is the son of Pakistani parents Shamim and Syed Zahid Kazmi. His father ran a plumbing business in Sharjah, having immigrated to the UAE in 1972 to work as an electrical engineer.

As of 2012, Raza was employed by United Bank Limited. He married business analyst Mehreen Tahir in 2021.

== Junior career ==
Raza started playing street cricket at a young age and joined Shahzad Altaf's cricket academy at the age of 13. He began as a left-arm fast bowler, modelling his technique on that of Pakistani fast bowling great Wasim Akram, but switched to left-arm spin as a teenager. He failed to make the national under-15 squad, but in 2004 represented the UAE at the Under-17 Asia Cup in India.

== International career ==
Raza made his List-A debut against India A in 2006. In 2007, he made his first-class debut against Scotland in the 2006 ICC Intercontinental Cup. In the 2009 ACC Twenty20 Cup Raza was the UAE's joint leading wicket-taker with twelve wickets along with Moiz Shahid.

In March 2013, Raza was named as the interim captain of the UAE for the 2013 ACC Twenty20 Cup in Nepal. In September 2013 he took career-best figures of 7/37 against Namibia in the 2011-13 ICC Intercontinental Cup.

In January 2018, he was named in the United Arab Emirates' squad for the 2018 ICC World Cricket League Division Two tournament.

In August 2018, he was included in the United Arab Emirates' squad for the 2018 Asia Cup Qualifier tournament. Despite the UAE losing the final to Hong Kong, he was named the player of the tournament, for taking sixteen wickets.

In December 2018, he was named in the United Arab Emirates' team for the 2018 ACC Emerging Teams Asia Cup. He was the leading wicket-taker for the UAE in the tournament, with six dismissals in three matches. Later the same month, he was one of three players to be given an eight-week ban from international cricket for breaching the Emirates Cricket Board's Player's Code of Conduct, after using Twitter to criticise the facilities in Karachi during the tournament. In January 2019, the Pakistan Cricket Board (PCB) had accepted apologies from all the cricketers involved. In March 2019, he returned to the UAE's squad following his suspension for their series against the United States.

In mid-2019, while on holiday in the United Kingdom, Raza was asked to train with Australia prior to the second Test of the 2019 Ashes series at Lord's, to prepare their batsmen to face left-arm spinner Jack Leach. Raza had earlier been a net bowler for Australia during the series against Pakistan in the UAE in March 2019.

In September 2019, he was named in the United Arab Emirates' squad for the 2019 ICC T20 World Cup Qualifier tournament in the UAE. However, prior to the tournament, he replaced Mohammad Naveed as captain, after Naveed was withdrawn from the squad. In December 2019, he was named as the captain of the ODI squad for the 2019 United Arab Emirates Tri-Nation Series.

In January 2020, in the fourth match of the 2020 Oman Tri-Nation Series against Namibia, he took his first five-wicket haul in ODI cricket. In December 2020, he was one of ten cricketers to be awarded a year-long full-time contract by the Emirates Cricket Board.

== Franchise career ==
On 3 June 2018, he was selected to play for the Edmonton Royals in the players' draft for the inaugural edition of the Global T20 Canada tournament.

Raza played for the Karnataka Tuskers in the 2019 T10 League.
