= Chirag Suri =

Emirati cricketer

Personal information
- Full name: Chirag Suri
- Born: 18 February 1995 (age 31); New Delhi, Delhi, India
- Batting: Right handed
- Role: Opening Batsman

International information
- National side: United Arab Emirates (2017–2023)
- ODI debut (cap 75): 6 March 2018 v West Indies
- Last ODI: 23 February 2023 v Namibia
- T20I debut (cap 42): 22 October 2018 v Australia
- Last T20I: 18 October 2022 v Sri Lanka

Domestic team information
- Years: Team
- 2019: Toronto Nationals - GT20
- 2018 - 2019: Bengal Tigers - T10
- 2023: Dubai Capitals - ILT20

Career statistics
Competition	ODI	T20I	FC	LA
Matches	37	31	2	45
Runs scored	946	817	137	1,123
Batting average	25.52	29.17	34.25	26.61
100s/50s	2/5	0/7	0/1	2/6
Top score	115	88	81	115
Catches/stumpings	10/–	0/–	1/–	13/–
- Source: ESPNcricinfo, 10 December 2022

Chirag Suri (born 18 February 1995) is a cricketer who represented the United Arab Emirates national cricket team between 2017 and 2023. In January 2021, Suri was named the vice-captain of the UAE team.

== International career ==
Suri represented the UAE national under-19 cricket team at the 2014 Under-19 Cricket World Cup. He made his first-class debut for the UAE senior team against Namibia in the 2015 – 17 ICC Intercontinental Cup on 16 September 2017.

He made his One Day International debut against the West Indies in the 2018 Cricket World Cup Qualifier on 6 March 2018. In August 2018, he was named in the United Arab Emirates' squad for the 2018 Asia Cup Qualifier tournament. He made his Twenty20 International (T20I) debut in a one-off match against Australia on 22 October 2018.

In September 2019, he was named in the United Arab Emirates' squad for the 2019 ICC T20 World Cup Qualifier tournament in the UAE. In December 2020, he was one of ten cricketers to be awarded a year-long full-time contract by the Emirates Cricket Board.

Suri scored his first century in ODI cricket against Oman in February 2022, with 115 runs.

== Franchise career ==
Suri was one of six cricketers from ICC associate member countries in the 2017 Indian Premier League auction. In February 2017, He was bought by the Gujarat Lions team for the 2017 Indian Premier League for 10 lakhs.

In June 2019, he was selected to play for the Toronto Nationals franchise team in the 2019 Global T20 Canada tournament.

As a UAE player, Suri also participates in the T10 League.

== Personal life ==
Suri was born in New Delhi, India. He moved to the UAE with his family in 2004. He attended Repton School Dubai. As of 2013, he was studying business management at Heriot-Watt University Dubai.
