= Zahoor Khan =

Emirati-Pakistani cricketer

Personal information
- Full name: Zahoor Khan
- Born: 25 May 1989 (age 37); Faisalabad, Punjab, Pakistan
- Batting: Right-handed
- Bowling: Right-arm medium fast
- Role: Bowler

International information
- National side: United Arab Emirates (2017–present)
- ODI debut (cap 71): 24 January 2017 v Scotland
- Last ODI: 1 May 2023 v Nepal
- T20I debut (cap 36): 16 January 2017 v Afghanistan
- Last T20I: 3 November 2023 v Nepal

Career statistics
Competition	ODI	T20I	FC	LA
Matches	56	37	30	52
Runs scored	134	11	73	106
Batting average	6.38	2.75	3.17	5.57
100s/50s	0/0	0/0	0/0	0/0
Top score	23	6	10*	16
Balls bowled	2594	793	5,541	2,407
Wickets	88	46	113	81
Bowling average	24.32	19.21	26.81	26.29
5 wickets in innings	2	0	6	1
10 wickets in match	1	0	1	0
Best bowling	6/34	4/29	7/86	6/34
Catches/stumpings	11/–	5/–	5/–	11/–
- Source: Cricinfo, 10 June 2023

Zahoor Khan (Urdu: ظہور خان; born 25 May 1989) is a Pakistani-born cricketer who plays for the United Arab Emirates national cricket team.

== International career ==
Khan made his Twenty20 International (T20I) debut for the United Arab Emirates against Afghanistan in the 2017 Desert T20 Challenge on 16 January 2017. He made his One Day International (ODI) debut against Scotland on 24 January 2017. On 2 March 2017, he took 6 wickets for 34 runs against Ireland, which were the best ODI figures by an Emirati bowler.

In January 2018, he was named in the UAE's squad for the 2018 ICC World Cricket League Division Two tournament. In August 2018, he was named in the UAE's squad for the 2018 Asia Cup Qualifier tournament. In December 2018, he was named in the UAE's team for the 2018 ACC Emerging Teams Asia Cup.

In June 2019, he was selected to play for the Brampton Wolves franchise team in the 2019 Global T20 Canada tournament. In September 2019, he was named in his country's squad for the 2019 ICC T20 World Cup Qualifier tournament in the UAE. In December 2020, he was among the ten cricketers who were awarded a year-long full-time contract by the Emirates Cricket Board.
