= Scottish cricket team in Hong Kong in 2015–16 =

	Hong Kong	Scotland
- Dates: 21 January 2016 – 31 January 2016
Captains	Tanwir Afzal	Preston Mommsen

Twenty20 International series
- Results: 2-match series drawn 1–1
Most runs	Tanwir Afzal (56)	Kyle Coetzer (70)
Most wickets	Haseeb Amjad (4); Nadeem Ahmed (4)	Richie Berrington (3); Safyaan Sharif (3); Bradley Wheal (3)

The Scotland cricket team toured Hong Kong in January 2016. The tour consisted of a first-class match, two One Day Internationals (ODIs) and two Twenty20 Internationals (T20I) match. The first-class match was part of the 2015–17 ICC Intercontinental Cup and the ODIs were part of the 2015–17 ICC World Cricket League Championship.

The ICC Intercontinental Cup match was abandoned without a ball bowled, due to a waterlogged pitch. The ODI was the first one to be played in Hong Kong, with Hong Kong beating Scotland by 109 runs. The T20I series was drawn 1–1.

== Squads ==
Hong Kong	Scotland
Tanwir Afzal (c); Mark Chapman (vc); Aizaz Khan; Anshy Rath; Babar Hayat; Christopher Carter (wk); Ehsan Nawaz; Haseeb Amjad; Ishtiaq Muhammad; Adil Mehmood; Nadeem Ahmed; Nizakat Khan; Kinchit Shah; Ninad Shah; Waqas Barkat; Waqas Khan; Jamie Atkinson	Preston Mommsen (c); Richie Berrington; Kyle Coetzer; Matthew Cross (wk); Josh Davey; Alasdair Evans; Con de Lange; Michael Leask; Matt Machan; Calum MacLeod; George Munsey; Safyaan Sharif; Robert Taylor; Bradley Wheal; Mark Watt

== T20I series ==
=== 1st T20I ===
30 January 2016
Scorecard

Scotland; 66/7 (10 overs)	v	Hong Kong; 72/1 (6.2 overs)
George Munsey 17 (10); Haseeb Amjad 1/8 (2 overs)		Babar Hayat 26* (14); Safyaan Sharif 1/15 (1 over)

Hong Kong won by 9 wickets
Mission Road Ground, Mong Kok
Umpires: Sarika Prasad (Sin) and Tabarak Dar (HK)
Player of the match: Babar Hayat (HK)

- Hong Kong won the toss and elected to field.
- Play was delayed due to a wet outfield with the match being reduced to 10 overs per-side.
- Bradley Wheal (Sco) made his T20I debut.

=== 2nd T20I ===
31 January 2016
Scorecard

Scotland; 161/9 (20 overs)	v	Hong Kong; 124 (18.4 overs)
Kyle Coetzer 70 (40); Haseeb Amjad 3/21 (4 overs)		Tanwir Afzal 56 (22); Bradley Wheal 3/20 (4 overs)

Scotland won by 37 runs
Mission Road Ground, Mong Kok
Umpires: Sarika Prasad (Sin) and Tabarak Dar (HK)
Player of the match: Kyle Coetzer (Sco)

- Hong Kong won the toss and elected to field.
