= Scheids Rechters Commissie =

The Scheids Rechters Commissie is the cricket umpires association in the Netherlands. Cricket is administered by the KNCB in this country. The KNCB is associated with the International Cricket Council (ICC).

The SRC aims to represent the umpires' welfare within the KNCB, to provide training for fresh and experienced umpires, cater to development of umpires via feedback and assessments and to other mechanisms along with improving the atmosphere for its members.

== Classifications and competitions ==
Umpires from KNCB (referred to a Bond's Umpires) are appointed to formally officiate in matches at various competition levels. As of 2017, these are primarily Topklasse, Hoofdklasse, Eerste Klasse and Overgangsklasse in the men's division and Dames Hoofdklasse for the women's division.

The gradings for umpires are managed by the SRC. This system controls which umpires are suitable for officiating in which grades of cricket. The internal gradings are regularly reviewed by the SRC based on assessments and feedback reports from actual matches.

A few umpires are nominated to the International Panel of ICC Development Umpires of umpires for officiating in international matches among the ICC Associate nations.

== Training and development ==
The basis for the training and certification for umpires is the ECB-ACO framework. The basic qualification is completion of the KNCB Bonds Umpire certification. The certifications for ACO Level 1 and 1A are relevant as further development for umpires.

== See also ==
- Association of Cricket Officials
- International Cricket Council
- Koninklijke Nederlandse Cricket Bond
