= List of List A cricket records of Nepal =

The '''Nepal national cricket team''' played its first-ever official List A match on January 13, 2014, against the United Arab Emirates (UAE), and these records date from that match. [[File:Rohit-Paudel-Pic.jpg|thumb|Rohit Paudel is Nepal's all time highest run-scorer in List A cricket]]

This is the list of List A cricket records of Nepal national cricket teams showing their team records and individual performance in list A format of the game.

== Listing notation ==
Team notation

- (300–3) indicates that a team scored 300 runs for three wickets and the innings was closed,

either due to a successful run chase or if no overs remained (or are able) to be bowled.

- (300) indicates that a team scored 300 runs and was all out,

either by losing all ten wickets or by having one or more batsmen unable to bat and losing the remaining wickets.

Batting notation

- (100) indicates that a batsman scored 100 runs and was out.
- (100*) indicates that a batsman scored 100 runs and was not out.

Bowling notation

- (5-25) indicates that a bowler has captured 5 wickets while giving away 25 runs.

Currently playing

- Record holders who are currently in the recent team squad of the series/tournament are shown in **bold**.

Comparison

== Team records ==
=== Team wins, losses, and ties ===
==== Matches played (total) ====
Team	Matches	Won	Lost	Tied	No Result	% Won
Nepal	38	14	23	-	1	37.84%
Note: Win percentage excludes no result matches and counts ties as half wins i.e. [won÷(matches - noresult)×100]. Source: Cricinfo. Last updated: 17 March 2018.						

==== Matches played (by country) ====
S.No.	Opponent	Matches	Won	Lost	Tied	No Result	% Won	First Win
1	UAE	5	1	4	0	0	20.00	11-Feb-2018
2	Scotland	4	0	4	0	0	0.00	
3	Hong Kong	4	1	2	0	1	33.33	12-Mar-2018
4	Canada	3	2	1	0	0	66.66	20-Jan-2015
5	Netherlands	5	2	3	0	0	20.00	18-Jan-2015
6	Uganda	2	1	1	0	0	50.00	28-Jan-2014
7	Namibia	4	4	0	0	0	100.00	21-Jan-2015
8	Kenya	5	2	3	0	0	40.00	13-Mar-2017
9	PNG	3	1	2	0	0	33.33	15-Mar-2018
10	Oman	1	0	1	0	0	0.00	
11	Zimbabwe	1	0	1	0	0	0.00	
12	Afghanistan	1	0	1	0	0	0.00	
	Total	38	14	23	0	1	37.84	2018
Note: * (S.No= Serial number is given to the country on the basis of the date of the first match took place.): % Won= [won/(Matches-no result)*100]; Source: Cricinfo. Last updated: 31 August 2026.								

=== Highest innings totals ===
Rank	Score	Opponent	Venue	Date
1	321 (50 overs)	Scotland	Forthill Cricket Ground, Dundee	8 June 2025
2	317/8 (50 overs)	United States	Tribhuvan University International Cricket Ground, Kirtipur	22 May 2026
3	310/8 (50 overs)	Oman	Tribhuvan University International Cricket Ground, Kirtipur	21 April 2023
4	297 (49.1 overs)	Papua New Guinea	Tribhuvan University International Cricket Ground, Kirtipur	9 March 2023
5	297/9 (49.5 overs)	Scotland	Forthill Cricket Ground, Dundee	2 June 2025
6	290/8 (50 overs)	Zimbabwe	Harare Sports Club, Harare	18 June 2023
Source: Cricinfo Last updated: 1 September 2026

==== Highest first innings totals ====
Rank	Score	Opponent	Venue	Date	Scorecard
1	240	Uganda	Mount Maunganui	28-Jan-2014	
2	221/6	UAE	Abu Dhabi	06-Dec-2017	
3	194	Afghanistan	Bulawayo	10-Mar-2018	
3	150	Hong Kong	Rangiora Oval	19-Jan-2014	
4	149	Scotland	Queens Sports Club	08-Mar-2018	
Source: Cricinfo. Last updated: 10 March 2018					

=== Lowest innings totals ===
Rank	Score	Opponent	Venue	Date
1	94 (38.1 overs)	Netherlands	Amstelveen	13 Aug 2016
2	103 (35.1 overs)	United Arab Emirates	Dubai International Cricket Stadium, Dubai	21 March 2022
3	104 (23.4 overs)	Pakistan	Multan Cricket Stadium, Multan	30 August 2023
4	111 (34.5 overs)	Hong Kong	Mong Kok	13 Oct 2017
5	113 (33.5 overs)	United Arab Emirates	ICC Academy Ground, Dubai	25 January 2019
Source: Cricinfo Last updated: 1 September 2026

== Individual records ==
=== Individual records (batting) ===
==== Most career runs ====
Rank	Player	Runs	Average	Career span	Ref.
1	Paras Khadka	1182	35.81	2014-	
2	Gyanendra Malla	904	26.58	2014-	
3	Sharad Vesawkar	837	32.19	2014-	
8	Binod Bhandari	396	22.00	2015-	
5	Sompal Kami	336	15.27	2014-	
7	Dipendra Singh Airee	311	22.21	2017-	
6	Basanta Regmi	295	18.43	2014-	
4	Aarif Sheikh	248	14.58	2014–	
9	Rohit Kumar	237	26.33	2018-	
10	Sagar Pun	234	12.31	2014–	
Source: Cricinfo. Last updated: 1 September 2026					

==== Highest career average ====
(Minimum 5 innings)
Rank	Player	Average	Career span	Ref.
1	Paras Khadka	35.81	**2014-2018**	
2	Sharad Vesawkar	32.19	**2014-2018**	
3	Gyanendra Malla	26.58	**2014-2018**	
4	Rohit Kumar	26.33	**2018-2018**	
5	Prithu Baskota	22.40	2014–2015	
6	Dipendra Singh Airee	22.21	**2017-2018**	
7	Binod Bhandari	22.00	2014–2017	
8	Basanta Regmi	18.43	**2014-2018**	
9	Pradeep Airee	17.80	2014–2015	
10	Shakti Gauchan	17.11	**2014-2018**	
11	Subash Khakurel	15.75	2015-2015	
12	Anil Mandal	15.40	2014–2016	
13	Sompal Kami	15.27	**2014-2018**	
14	Aarif Sheikh	14.58	**2015-2018**	
Source: Cricinfo. Last updated: 17 March 2018				

==== Highest career strike rate ====
Rank	Strike rate	Batsman	Career runs	Innings	ODI career span
1	89.18	Binod Bhandari	396	20	2014–2017
3	79.54	Paras Khadka	1182	34	**2014-2018**
2	78.94	Karan KC	75	12	**2015-2018**
4	63.75	Sompal Kami	336	33	**2014-2018**
6	61.34	Dipendra Singh Airee	311	15	2017-2018
5	60.95	Gyanendra Malla	904	37	**2014-2018**
	Qualification: 10 Innings played. Source: Cricinfo. Last updated: 17 March 2018.				

==== Most centuries in a career ====
Rank	Player	Centuries	Career span	Ref.
1	Paras Khadka	2	**2014-2018**	
2	Anil Mandal	1	2014–2016	
Source: Cricinfo. Last updated: 6 March 2018				

==== Most half-centuries in a career ====
Rank	Player	50s	Career span
1	Paras Khadka	8	**2014-2018**
2	Sharad Vesawkar	6	**2014-2018**
3	Gyanendra Malla	4	**2014-2018**
4	Dipendra Singh Airee	2	**2017-2018**
Source: Cricinfo. Last updated: 12 March 2018Qualification- half century 2+

==== Most sixes in a career ====
Rank	Player	6s	Career span
1	Paras Khadka	35	**2014-2018**
2	Binod Bhandari	18	2014–2017
3	Dipendra Singh Airee	7	**2017-2018**
4	Karan KC	5	**2015-2018**
5	Gyanendra Malla	4	**2014-2018**
Source: Cricinfo. Last updated: 15 March 2018

==== Most fours in a career ====
Rank	Player	4s	Career span
1	Paras Khadka	106	**2014-2018**
2	Gyanendra Malla	83	**2014-2018**
3	Sharad Vesawkar	52	**2014-2018**
4	Sompal Kami	32	**2014-2018**
5	Binod Bhandari	26	2014–2017
7	Dipendra Singh Airee	24	**2017-2018**
6	Basanta Regmi	22	**2014-2018**
8	Sagar Pun	20	2014–2017
9	Aarif Sheikh	18	**2015-2018**
10	Rohit Kumar	16	**2018-2018**
Source: Cricinfo. Last updated: 17 March 2018

==== Highest individual scores ====
Rank	Player	High score	Career span	Ref.
1	Paras Khadka	112*	**2014-2018**	
2	Anil Mandal	100	2014–2016	
3	Gyanendra Malla	91*	**2014-2018**	
4	Sharad Vesawkar	81*	**2014-2018**	
5	Binod Bhandari	73	2014–2017	
6	Subash Khakurel	63	2015-2015	
7	Dipendra Singh Airee	62	**2017-2018**	
8	Prithu Baskota	59*	2014–2015	
9	Aarif Sheikh	50	**2015-2018**	
10	Rohit Kumar	48*	2018-2018	
11	Sagar Pun	47	2014–2017	
Source: Cricinfo. Last updated: 12 March 2018				

=== Individual records (bowling) ===
==== Most career wickets (minimum 5 wickets) ====
Rank	Player	Wickets	Average	Career span	Ref.
1	Sompal Kami	52	26.63	**2014-2018**	
2	Basanta Regmi	46	24.78	**2014-2018**	
3	Sandeep Lamichhane	42	17.90	**2016-2018**	
4	Sagar Pun	19	25.63	2014–2017	
5	Karan KC	19	28.10	**2015-2018**	
6	Shakti Gauchan	18	35.16	**2014-2018**	
7	Paras Khadka	17	39.58	**2014-2018**	
8	Sharad Vesawkar	8	22.62	**2014-2018**	
9	Dipendra Singh Airee	7	11.57	**2017-2018**	
Source: Cricinfo. Last updated: 17 March 2018					

==== Best Bowling Figures ====
(Minimum 3 Wickets in an inning)

Rank	Player	Figures	Career span	Ref.
1	Sandeep Lamichhane	5/20	**2016-2018**	
2	Karan KC	5/26	**2015-2018**	
3	Sompal Kami	5/27	**2014-2018**	
4	Dipendra Singh Airee	4/14	**2017-2018**	
4	Sharad Vesawkar	4/28	**2014-2018**	
5	Paras Khadka	3/14	**2014-2018**	
6	Sagar Pun	3/18	2014–2017	
7	Basanta Regmi	3/34	**2014-2018**	
Source: Cricinfo. Last updated: 8 March 2018				

==== Best career averages ====
(Minimum 10 Wickets)

Rank	Player	Average	Matches	Wickets	Career span	Ref.
1	Sandeep Lamichhane	17.90	21	42	**2016-2018**	
2	Basanta Regmi	24.78	35	46	**2014-2018**	
3	Sagar Pun	25.63	21	19	2014–2017	
5	Sompal Kami	26.63	37	52	**2014-2018**	
4	Karan KC	28.10	19	19	**2015-2018**	
6	Shakti Gauchan	35.16	23	18	**2014-2018**	
7	Paras Khadka	39.58	34	17	**2014-2018**	
Source: Cricinfo. Last updated: 17 March 2018						

==== Best career economy rate ====
Rank	Player	Economy	Balls Bowled	Career span
1	Sagar Pun	3.76	777	2014–2017
3	Paras Khadka	3.82	1056	**2014-2018**
2	Shakti Gauchan	3.85	985	**2014-2018**
4	Basanta Regmi	4.03	1695	**2014-2018**
5	Sandeep Lamichhane	4.04	1115	**2016-2018**
6	Sharad Vesawkar	4.19	259	**2014-2018**
8	Lalit Bhandari	4.27	108	**2017-2018**
7	Karan KC	4.28	747	**2015-2018**
9	Dipendra Singh Airee	4.30	113	**2017-2018**
10	Lalit Rajbanshi	4.31	246	**2018-2018**
11	Sompal Kami	5.00	1659	**2014-2018**
Source: Cricinfo. Last updated: 17 March 2018 Qualification- 100 Balls Bowled

==== Best career strike rate ====
Rank	Player	Strike rate	Balls Bowled	wickets	Career span
1	Dipendra Singh Airee	16.1	113	7	**2017-2018**
1	Sandeep Lamichhane	26.5	1115	42	**2016-2018**
3	Sompal Kami	31.9	1659	52	**2014-2018**
2	Sharad Vesawkar	32.3	259	8	**2014-2018**
4	Basanta Regmi	36.8	1695	46	**2014-2018**
5	Karan KC	39.3	747	19	**2015-2018**
6	Sagar Pun	40.8	777	19	2014–2017
7	Shakti Gauchan	54.7	985	18	**2014-2018**
8	Paras Khadka	62.1	1056	17	**2014-2018**
Source: Cricinfo. Last updated:17 March 2018Qualification- 5 Wickets

==== Most 5 wickets Haul ====
Rank	Player	5W	Matches	Career span	Ref.
1	Karan KC	1	17	**2015-2018**	
	Sandeep Lamichhane	1	19	**2016-2018**	
	Sompal Kami	1	35	**2014-2018**	
Source: Cricinfo. Last updated: 8 March 2018					

==== Most 4 wickets Haul ====
Rank	Player	4W	Career span	Ref.
1	Sandeep Lamichhane	2	**2016-2018**	
	Sompal Kami	2	**2014-2018**	
2	Dipendra Singh Airee	1	**2017-2018**	
	Sharad Vesawkar	1	**2014-2018**	
Source: Cricinfo. Last updated: 17 March 2018				

=== Individual records (wicket-keeping) ===
==== Most dismissals in career ====
Rank	Dismissals	Wicket-Keeper	Catches	Stumpings	Innings	Career Span
1	13	Subash Khakurel	11	2	8	2015-2015
2	13	Dilip Nath	9	4	9	**2017-2018**
3	9	Binod Bhandari	4	5	8	2014–2017
4	6	Raju Rijal	2	4	3	2016-2016
5	4	Mahesh Chhetri	3	1	4	2014–2015
6	4	Anil Kumar Shah	3	1	4	**2018-2018**
7	2	Gyanendra Malla	0	2	1	**2014-2018**
	Source: Cricinfo. Last updated: 17 February 2018.					

=== Individual Records(Fielding) ===
==== Most Catches in a career ====
Rank	Player	Catches	Career span
1	Gyanendra Malla	15	**2014-2018**
2	Binod Bhandari	12	2014–2017
3	Paras Khadka	11	**2014-2018**
	Subash Khakurel	11	2015-2015
5	Sagar Pun	9	2014–2017
	Dilip Nath	9	**2017-2018**
7	Sompal Kami	8	**2014-2018**
	Sandeep Lamichhane	8	**2016-2018**
9	Basanta Regmi	6	**2014-2018**
10	Dipendra Singh Airee	5	**2017-2018**
Source: Cricinfo. Last updated: 17 March 2018Qualification= 5+ catches

=== Individual records (other) ===
==== Most Matches played in career ====
Rank	Player	Matches	Career span	Ref.
1	Gyanendra Malla	37	**2014-2018**	
	Sompal Kami	37	**2014-2018**	
3	Basanta Regmi	35	**2014-2018**	
4	Paras Khadka	34	**2014-2018**	
5	Sharad Vesawkar	32	**2014-2018**	
6	Shakti Gauchan	23	**2014-2018**	
7	Binod Bhandari	21	2014–2017	
	Sagar Pun	21	2014–2017	
	Sandeep Lamichhane	21	**2016-2018**	
10	Karan KC	19	**2015-2018**	
Source: Cricinfo. Last updated: 15 March 2018				

==== Most Man of the Match Winner ====
Rank	Player	Times	Career span	Ref.
1	Paras Khadka	3	**2014-2018**	
2	Sandeep Lamichhane	2	**2016-2018**	
3	Prithu Baskota	1	2014–2015	
	Karan KC	1	**2015-2018**	
	Rohit Kumar	1	**2018-2018**	
	Dipendra Singh Airee	1	**2017-2018**	
Source: Cricinfo. Last updated: 15 March 2018				

== See also ==
- List of Nepalese Twenty20 cricketers
- List of Nepalese List A cricketers
- List of Nepal Twenty20 International cricketers
- List of Nepalese First-class cricketers
