= List of Nepalese List A cricketers =

This is a list of Nepalese List A cricketers. List A cricket matches are those between international teams or the highest standard of domestic teams. Matches played in the tournament of World Cricket League division 2 and above also qualify as List A. This list is not limited to those who have played List A cricket for Nepal and may include Nepalese players who played their List A cricket elsewhere means in Nepal national team, or any other domestic matches which has list a status. Nepal got honored with an ODI status on 15 March 2018 after the win over Papua New Guinea in the playoff game of The ICC world cup qualifier-2018. Netherlands beat Hong Kong in the next game ensured that Nepal will secure an ODI along with T20I status till 2022 and a road to ICC Intercontinental Cup as well as ICC World Cricket League Championship which will be continued for 4 years till 2022.

The list A players of Nepal are listed alphabetically by their last name.

== Key ==
General

- ‡ – Captain
- † – Wicket-keeper
- Mat – Number of matches played
- strike – Strike rate
- No – Not out
- Bold career span represents that the player is in the latest team squad.

Batting

- Inn – Number of innings batted
- Runs – Runs scored in career
- HS – Highest score
- * – Batsman remained not out
- Avg – Runs scored per dismissal
- 4s – Fours
- 6s – Sixes

Bowling

- Balls – Balls bowled in career
- Wkt – Wickets taken in career
- BBI – Best bowling in an innings
- Ave – Average runs per wicket
- Eco – Economy
- 4w – 4 wicket haul
- 5w – 5 wicket haul

Fielding

- Ca – Catches taken
- St – Stumpings made

== Players ==
Statistics are correct as of Nepal's most recent List A match, against Netherlands 17 March 2018.

Name	Career.span	Mat	Batting										Bowling									Fielding		Team(s)	Ref(s)
Name	Career.span	Mat	Inn	Runs	HS	Avg	Strike Rate	100	50	4s	6s	No	Balls	Runs con.	wkt	BBI.	Ave.	Eco..	Strike rate	4w	5w	Ca	St	Team(s)	Ref(s)
Pradeep Airee	2014–2015	6	6	89	26	17.80	60.54	0	0	6	2	1	60	26	0	–	–	2.60	-	0	0	2	0	Nepal	
Prithu Baskota	2014–2015	6	6	112	59*	22.40	70.00	0	1	13	3	1	84	88	1	1/19	88.00	6.28	84.0	0	0	2	0	Nepal	
Binod Bhandari †	2014-Current	21	20	396	73	22.00	89.18	0	1	26	18	2	0	-	0	–	–	-	-	0	0	12	5	Nepal	
Naresh Budhayer	2015–2016	6	4	39	16	6.50	39.00	0	0	2	1	0	0	-	0	–	–	-	-	0	0	3	0	Nepal	
Mahesh Chhetri †	2014–2015	4	4	52	21	13.00	46.84	0	0	2	0	0	0	-	0	–	–	-	-	0	0	3	1	Nepal	
Shakti Gauchan	2014-2018	23	16	154	37*	17.11	57.24	0	0	13	2	7	985	633	18	2/16	35.16	3.85	54.7	0	0	4	0	Nepal	
Sompal Kami	2014-Current	37	33	336	37*	15.27	63.75	0	0	32	3	11	1659	1385	52	5/27	26.63	5.00	31.9	2	1	8	0	Nepal	
Bhuwan Karki	2015–2015	1	1	2	2	2.00	40.00	0	0	0	0	0	60	31	1	1/31	31.00	3.10	60.0	0	0	1	0	Nepal	
Avinash Karn	2014–2015	2	2	20	17	20.00	60.60	0	0	3	0	1	42	49	0	–	–	7.00	-	0	0	0	0	Nepal	
Karan KC	2015-Current	19	12	75	42*	9.37	78.94	0	0	7	5	4	747	534	19	5/26	28.10	4.28	39.3	0	1	3	0	Nepal	
Paras Khadka ‡	2014-2018	34	34	1182	112*	35.81	79.54	2	8	106	35	1	1056	673	17	3/14	39.58	3.82	62.1	0	0	11	0	Nepal	
Subash Khakurel †	2015–2015	8	8	126	63	15.75	46.84	0	1	9	0	0	0	-	0	–	–	-	-	0	0	11	2	Nepal	
Gyanendra Malla †	2014-2023	37	37	904	91*	26.58	60.95	0	4	83	4	3	0	-	0	–	–	-	-	0	0	15	2	Nepal	
Anil Mandal	2014–2016	10	10	154	100	15.40	59.68	1	0	12	1	0	6	14	0	–	–	14.0	-	0	0	3	0	Nepal	
Jitendra Mukhiya	2014–2014	3	2	4	4	2.00	33.33	0	0	0	0	0	126	166	2	2/58	83.00	7.90	63.0	0	0	0	0	Nepal	
Rajesh Pulami	2015–2016	3	2	10	9	5.00	34.48	0	0	1	0	0	6	13	0	–	–	13.0	-	0	0	0	0	Nepal	
Sagar Pun	2014–2017	21	20	234	47	12.31	48.04	0	0	20	0	1	777	487	19	3/18	25.63	3.76	40.8	0	0	9	0	Nepal	
Basanta Regmi	2014-2018	35	27	295	45	18.43	54.48	0	0	22	3	11	1695	1140	46	3/34	24.78	4.03	36.8	0	0	6	0	Nepal	
Aarif Sheikh	2015-Current	17	17	248	50	14.58	53.91	0	1	18	0	0	42	25	0	–	–	3.57	-	0	0	4	0	Nepal	
Sharad Vesawkar	2014-2018	32	31	837	81*	32.19	57.68	0	6	52	2	5	259	181	8	4/28	22.62	4.19	32.3	1	0	2	0	Nepal	
Sandeep Lamichhane	2016-Current	21	11	36	14*	6.00	31.03	0	0	2	0	5	1115	752	42	5/20	17.90	4.04	26.5	2	1	8	0	Nepal	
Dipendra Singh Airee	2017-Current	15	15	311	62	22.21	61.34	0	2	24	7	1	113	81	7	4/14	11.57	4.30	16.1	1	0	5	0	Nepal	
Dilip Nath	2017-2018	9	9	97	41	10.77	44.70	0	0	11	0	0	0	-	0	-	-	-	-	0	0	9	4	Nepal	
Rohit Kumar	2018-Current	12	12	237	48*	26.33	50.53	0	0	16	0	3	0	-	0	-	-	-	-	0	0	3	0	Nepal	
Sushan Bhari	2017-2017	1	1	1	1*	-	12.50	0	0	0	0	1	24	18	1	1/18	18.00	4.50	24.0	0	0	0	0	Nepal	
Irshad Ahamad	2015-2015	2	0	-	-	-	-	-	-	-	-	-	66	55	0	-	-	5.00	-	0	0	0	0	Nepal	
Anil Sah	2018-2018	5	5	50	26	10.00	54.94	0	0	7	0	0	0	-	0	-	-	-	-	0	0	3	1	Nepal	
Sunil Dhamala	2017-2017	2	2	4	3	2.00	25.00	0	0	0	0	0	0	-	0	-	-	-	-	0	0	0	0	Nepal	
Lalit Bhandari	2017-2018	2	1	0*	0	-	0.00	0	0	0	0	1	108	77	1	1/29	77.00	4.27	108.0	0	0	0	0	Nepal	
Lalit Rajbanshi	2018-Current	6	3	6	4	2.00	21.42	0	0	1	0	0	246	177	5	2/38	35.40	4.31	49.2	0	0	3	0	Nepal	

== See also ==
- Nepal national cricket team
- List A cricket
- List of Nepal Twenty20 International cricketers
- List of Nepalese First-class cricketers
- List of Nepalese Twenty20 cricketers
- List of List A cricket records of Nepal
