= World Cricket League Division Two =

WCL Division Two
- Administrator: ICC
- Format: 50 overs (List A)
- First edition: 2007
- Tournament format: Round robin, playoffs
- Number of teams: 6
- Current champion: Namibia
- Most successful: UAE (3 titles)

ICC World Cricket League Division Two forms part of the World Cricket League (WCL) system. Like all other divisions, WCL Division Two is contested as a standalone tournament rather than as an actual league. Unlike lower divisions, however, matches in Division Two hold list-A status.

The inaugural Division Two tournament was held in 2007, hosted by Namibia and featured six teams, the top four of which progressed to the 2009 World Cup Qualifier. The 2011 tournament, played in Dubai, similarly qualified the top four teams for the 2014 World Cup Qualifier, but also promoted the top two teams to the Intercontinental Cup and the WCL Championship. The 2015 Division Two event, again hosted by Namibia, served only to qualify teams for the Intercontinental Cup and WCL Championship. The top two teams at the 2018 event were promoted to the 2018 World Cup Qualifier.

Following the conclusion of the 2019 tournament, the World Cricket League was replaced by the ICC Cricket World Cup League 2 and the ICC Cricket World Cup Challenge League. The top four teams joined Scotland, Nepal and the United Arab Emirates in the 2019–21 ICC Cricket World Cup League 2 and gained One Day International status. The bottom two teams progressed to the 2019–21 ICC Cricket World Cup Challenge League, along with other teams from the World Cricket League.

Overall, 14 teams participated in the five Division Two tournaments. Namibia was the only team to appear in all Division Two tournaments.

== Results ==
Year	Host(s)	Venue(s)	Final		
Year	Host(s)	Venue(s)	Winner	Result	Runner-up
2007	Namibia	Windhoek	UAE; 347/8 (50 overs)	UAE won by 67 runs scorecard	Oman; 280 (43.2 overs)
2011	UAE	Dubai	UAE; 201/5 (45.3 overs)	UAE won by 5 wickets scorecard	Namibia; 200 (49.3 overs)
2015	Namibia	Windhoek	Netherlands; 213/2 (41.0 overs)	Netherlands won by 8 wickets scorecard	Namibia; 212 (49.2 overs)
2018	Namibia	Windhoek	UAE; 277/4 (50 overs)	UAE won by 7 runs scorecard	Nepal; 270/8 (50 overs)
2019	Namibia	Windhoek	Namibia; 226/7 (50 overs)	Namibia won by 145 runs Scorecard	Oman; 81 (29 overs)

== Performance by team ==
Legend

- 1st – Champions
- 2nd – Runners-up
- 3rd – Third place
- Q – Qualified
- — Hosts

Team	(Namibia) 2007	(United Arab Emirates) 2011	(Namibia) 2015	(Namibia) 2018	(Namibia) 2019	Total
Argentina	6th	—	—	—	—	1
Bermuda	—	6th	—	—	—	1
Canada	—	—	6th	3rd	5th	3
Denmark	4th	—	—	—	—	1
Hong Kong	—	4th	—	—	6th	2
Kenya	—	—	3rd	6th	—	2
Namibia	3rd	2nd	2nd	4th	1st	5
Nepal	—	—	4th	2nd	—	2
Netherlands	—	—	1st	—	—	1
Oman	2nd	—	—	5th	2nd	3
Papua New Guinea	—	3rd	—	—	3rd	2
Uganda	5th	5th	5th	—	—	3
United Arab Emirates	1st	1st	—	1st	—	3
United States	—	—	—	—	4th	1

== Player statistics ==
Year	Most runs	Most wickets	MVP	Ref
2007	(Namibia) Gerrie Snyman (588)	(United Arab Emirates) Arshad Ali (17)	(Namibia) Gerrie Snyman	
2011	(Namibia) Craig Williams (335)	(Namibia) Louis Klazinga (14) (Namibia) Kola Burger (14)	(Namibia) Craig Williams	
2015	(Namibia) Stephen Baard (249)	(Netherlands) Ahsan Malik (17)	(Nepal) Paras Khadka	
2018	(Nepal) Paras Khadka (241)	(Nepal) Sandeep Lamichhane (17) (Oman) Bilal Khan (17)	(Nepal) Sandeep Lamichhane	
2019	(Hong Kong) Anshuman Rath (270)	(United States) Ali Khan (17)	(Namibia) JJ Smit	
