= Cricket World Cup League 2 =

International cricket tournament

ICC Men's Cricket World Cup League 2
- First season: 2019–23
- Administrator: International Cricket Council (ICC)
- Most recent champion: United States (1st title)
- Most titles: Scotland; United States (1 title each)
- Relegation to: ICC Cricket World Cup Challenge League
- Website: icc-cricket.com
- 2024–26

The ICC Men's Cricket World Cup League 2 is an international cricket competition contested in the One Day International format and the second level of the three-league (now two leagues) Cricket World Cup qualification system which was introduced in 2019. Seven teams participate and either directly advance to the World Cup Qualifier or advance to the World Cup Qualifier Play-off for another chance to enter the Qualifier. Two teams from the Qualifier qualify for the next Cricket World Cup. League 2 and the Qualifier Play-off replaced the ICC World Cricket League Championship and ICC World Cricket League Division Two for determining World Cup qualification. The first edition was in 2019–2023, played from August 2019 to March 2023.

== Performance by teams ==
1st	Champion
R	Relegated
P	Promoted

Edition Team	2019-23 (7)	2024-26 (8)
Canada	P	7th
Namibia	4th	TBD
Netherlands	—	3rd
Nepal	3rd	6th
Oman	2nd	TBD
Papua New Guinea	7th	—
Scotland	1st	2nd
United Arab Emirates	6th	8th
United States	5th	1st

== See also ==
- ICC Cricket World Cup Super League
- ICC Cricket World Cup Challenge League
