= 2015–2017 ICC World Cricket League Championship =

International cricket tournament

- Official logo of the 2015–17 ICC World Cricket League Championship
- Administrator: International Cricket Council
- Cricket format: One Day International, List A
- Tournament format: Double Round-robin
- Host: Various
- Champions: Netherlands (1st title)
- Participants: 8
- Matches: 56
- Most runs: (Hong Kong) Anshuman Rath (678)
- Most wickets: (Hong Kong) Nadeem Ahmed (24) (Scotland) Alasdair Evans (24)

The 2015–2017 ICC World Cricket League Championship was the second edition of the ICC World Cricket League Championship. It took place from 2015 until 2017, in parallel with the 2015-17 ICC Intercontinental Cup. Both Ireland and Afghanistan had been promoted to the main ICC ODI Championship and did not compete in this tournament. Instead, Kenya and Nepal were included in the tournament. The tournament was played in a round-robin format. All matches were recorded as List A matches, and those in which both teams had ODI status were also recorded as ODIs.

The Netherlands won the tournament and joined the thirteen-team 2020–23 ICC Cricket World Cup Super League. The Netherlands regained their ODI status after losing it at the 2014 Cricket World Cup Qualifier. Inclusion in the ICC ODI League will mean they will play 24 fixtures against Full Members until 2022.

The Netherlands, along with Scotland, Papua New Guinea and Hong Kong also joined the lowest ranked four teams from the ICC ODI Championship (as of September 2017) in the 2018 Cricket World Cup Qualifier. The bottom four teams, Kenya, Nepal, the United Arab Emirates and Namibia were all relegated to Division Two and played the finalists of Division Three for the remaining two spots in the 2018 CWC Qualifier.

== Teams ==
The following eight teams took part in the tournament based on the results from 2014 Cricket World Cup Qualifier and the 2015 ICC World Cricket League Division Two:

- Scotland (1st in 2014 Cricket World Cup Qualifier, New Zealand)
- United Arab Emirates (2nd in 2014 Cricket World Cup Qualifier, New Zealand)
- Hong Kong (3rd in 2014 Cricket World Cup Qualifier, New Zealand)
- Papua New Guinea (4th in 2014 Cricket World Cup Qualifier, New Zealand)
- Netherlands (1st in 2015 ICC World Cricket League Division Two, Namibia)
- Namibia (2nd in 2015 ICC World Cricket League Division Two, Namibia)
- Kenya (3rd in 2015 ICC World Cricket League Division Two, Namibia)
- Nepal (4th in 2015 ICC World Cricket League Division Two, Namibia)

== Fixtures ==
The breakdown of fixtures was as follows: During each round, each team played against their opponent twice.

Round	Window	Home team	Away team	Match status	Result
1	May – July 2015	Namibia	Hong Kong	List A	1–1
1	May – July 2015	Netherlands	Papua New Guinea	List A	2–0
1	May – July 2015	Kenya	United Arab Emirates	List A	1–1
1	May – July 2015	Scotland	Nepal	List A	2–0
2	September – November 2015	Netherlands	Scotland	List A	0–0
2	September – November 2015	Namibia	Kenya	List A	0–2
2	September – November 2015	United Arab Emirates	Hong Kong	ODI	0–2
2	September – November 2015	Nepal	Papua New Guinea	List A	0–2
3	January – May 2016	Hong Kong	Scotland	ODI	1–0
3	January – May 2016	United Arab Emirates	Netherlands	List A	0–2
3	January – May 2016	Nepal	Namibia	List A	2–0
3	January – May 2016	Papua New Guinea	Kenya	List A	2–0
4	August – November 2016	Netherlands	Nepal	List A	1–1
4	August – November 2016	Scotland	United Arab Emirates	ODI	2–0
4	August – November 2016	Papua New Guinea	Namibia	List A	2–0
4	August – November 2016	Kenya	Hong Kong	List A	1–1
5	February – June 2017	Hong Kong	Netherlands	List A	0–2
5	February – June 2017	Nepal	Kenya	List A	1–1
5	February – June 2017	United Arab Emirates	Papua New Guinea	ODI	1–1
5	February – June 2017	Scotland	Namibia	List A	1–1
6	September – October 2017	Namibia	United Arab Emirates	List A	1–1
6	September – October 2017	Papua New Guinea	Scotland	ODI	1–1
6	September – October 2017	Kenya	Netherlands	List A	1–1
6	September – October 2017	Hong Kong	Nepal	List A	1–0
7 Simultaneous Round	December 2017	Nepal	United Arab Emirates	List A	0–2
7 Simultaneous Round	December 2017	Kenya	Scotland	List A	0–2
7 Simultaneous Round	December 2017	Hong Kong	Papua New Guinea	ODI	2–0
7 Simultaneous Round	December 2017	Namibia	Netherlands	List A	0–2

== Points table ==
Pos	Team	Pld	W	L	T	NR	Pts	NRR	Qualification
1	Netherlands	14	10	2	0	2	22	0.978	Champion and advance to 2018 ICC World Cup Qualifier & 2020–23 ICC Cricket World Cup Super League
2	Scotland	14	8	3	0	3	19	0.849	Advance to 2018 ICC World Cup Qualifier
3	Hong Kong	14	8	4	0	2	18	1.082	Advance to 2018 ICC World Cup Qualifier
4	Papua New Guinea	14	8	6	0	0	16	−0.379	Advance to 2018 ICC World Cup Qualifier
5	Kenya	14	6	8	0	0	12	−0.551	Relegated to Division Two
6	United Arab Emirates	14	5	9	0	0	10	−0.379	Relegated to Division Two
7	Nepal	14	4	9	0	1	9	−0.451	Relegated to Division Two
8	Namibia	14	3	11	0	0	6	−0.602	Relegated to Division Two

Source: ESPNcricinfo

== Matches ==
=== Round 1 ===
The fixtures for round one were announced on 5 May 2015.

15 May 2015
Scorecard

Hong Kong; 194/9 (50 overs)	v	Namibia; 195/9 (49.2 overs)
Irfan Ahmed 40 (52); Nicolaas Scholtz 4/42 (8 overs)		Sarel Burger 52 (97); Nadeem Ahmed 4/27 (10 overs)

Namibia won by 1 wicket
Wanderers Cricket Ground, Windhoek
Umpires: Adrian Holdstock (SA) and Wynand Louw (Nam)
Player of the match: Nicolaas Scholtz (Nam)

- Namibia won the toss and elected to field.
- Waqas Khan (HK) made his List A debut.

17 May 2015
Scorecard

Namibia; 109 (36.1 overs)	v	Hong Kong; 113/2 (36.2 overs)
Raymond van Schoor 36 (78); Tanwir Afzal 5/17 (10 overs)		Roy Lamsam 41* (107); Gerrie Snyman 1/9 (5 overs)

Hong Kong won by 8 wickets
Wanderers Cricket Ground, Windhoek
Umpires: Adrian Holdstock (SA) and Wynand Louw (Nam)
Player of the match: Tanwir Afzal (HK)

- Namibia won the toss and elected to bat.

22 June 2015
Scorecard

Papua New Guinea; 122/9 (24 overs)	v	Netherlands; 125/5 (18.1 overs)
Assad Vala 29 (32); Ahsan Malik 4/37 (5 overs)		Michael Swart 38 (36); Charles Amini 3/26 (3.1 overs)

Netherlands won by 5 wickets (DLS method)
Hazelaarweg, Rotterdam
Umpires: Gregory Brathwaite (WI) and Sarika Prasad (Sin)

- Netherlands won the toss and elected to field.
- Rain delayed the start until 15:15 and reduced the match to 30 overs per side. Rain further interrupted the match after 11.1 overs of the PNG innings and reduced the match to 24 overs per side.
- Netherlands had to chase a target of 124 runs to win from 24 overs in their innings.
- Loa Nou, John Reva and Chad Soper (all PNG) made their List A debuts.

24 June 2015
Scorecard

Netherlands; 297/6 (50 overs)	v	Papua New Guinea; 212 (40.3 overs)
Peter Borren 105* (111); Norman Vanua 2/45 (10 overs)		Kila Pala 56 (42); Pieter Seelaar 2/23 (4 overs)

Netherlands won by 85 runs
VRA Cricket Ground, Amstelveen
Umpires: Gregory Brathwaite (WI) and Sarika Prasad (Sin)

- Papua New Guinea won the toss and elected to field.
- Sese Bau (PNG) made his List A debut.
- Peter Borren (Ned) scored his first List A century.

25 June 2015
Scorecard

Kenya; 171 (40.5 overs)	v	United Arab Emirates; 173/5 (41.4 overs)
Nehemiah Odhiambo 62 (71); Mohammad Naveed 4/36 (8.5 overs)		Amjad Ali 49 (88); Nehemiah Odhiambo 2/28 (7 overs)

United Arab Emirates won by 5 wickets
Rose Bowl (Nursery Ground), Southampton
Umpires: Shaun George (SA) and David Odhiambo (Ken)

- United Arab Emirates won the toss and elected to field.

27 June 2015
Scorecard

Kenya; 270/6 (50 overs)	v	United Arab Emirates; 205 (44.3 overs)
Irfan Karim 67 (107); Manjula Guruge 2/46 (10 overs)		Mohammad Tauqir 54 (42); James Ngoche 5/26 (8.3 overs)

Kenya won by 65 runs
Rose Bowl (Nursery Ground), Southampton
Umpires: Shaun George (SA) and David Odhiambo (Ken)

- United Arab Emirates won the toss and elected to field.

29 July 2015
Scorecard

Scotland; 235/7 (36 overs)	v	Nepal; 232/5 (36 overs)
Preston Mommsen 78 (62); Basant Regmi 2/47 (8 overs)		Anil Mandal 100 (93); Gavin Main 2/39 (7 overs)

Scotland won by 3 runs
Cambusdoon New Ground, Ayr
Umpires: Shaun George (SA) and Ian Ramage (Sco)

- Nepal won the toss and elected to field.
- The start was delayed by a wet outfield and the match reduced to 36 overs per-side.
- Rajesh Pulami (Nep) and Gavin Main (Sco) made their List A debuts.

31 July 2015
Scorecard

Nepal; 167 (49.1 overs)	v	Scotland; 111/1 (13.5 overs)
Sharad Vesawkar 30 (66); Alasdair Evans 3/18 (10 overs)		Matthew Cross 51* (37); Sompal Kami 1/35 (4 overs)

Scotland won by 9 wickets (DLS method)
Cambusdoon New Ground, Ayr
Umpires: Shaun George (SA) and Ian Ramage (Sco)

- Scotland won the toss and elected to field.
- Rain delayed the start of Scotland's innings as a result of which Scotland's innings was reduced to 22 overs with a target of 110 runs. Scotland batted for 1.4 overs before play had to be called off for the day due to further rain and the match was moved to the reserve day.
- The game continued into the reserve day with Scotland on 15/0 from 1.4 overs, chasing the target of 110 runs to win from 22 overs.
- Mark Watt (Sco) made his List A debut.

=== Round 2 ===
The fixtures for round two were announced in August 2015.

14 September 2015
Scorecard

Netherlands; 161/6 (43 overs)	v	Scotland
Pieter Seelaar 68 (104); Josh Davey 3/22 (9 overs)

No result
VRA Cricket Ground, Amstelveen
Umpires: Peter Nero (WI) and Chettithody Shamshuddin (Ind)

- Scotland won the toss and elected to field.
- The start was delayed by rain. Further rain stopped play during the Netherlands innings, with their score at 74/5 in the 24th over. The game was called off for the day by the umpires with it continuing into the reserve day.
- A wet outfield delayed the restart of play on the reserve day. Heavy rain stopped play on the reserve day with the Netherlands on 161/6 in the 43rd over with play finally abandoned.
- Max O'Dowd (Ned) made his List A debut.

16 September 2015
Scorecard

Netherlands	v	Scotland

Match abandoned
VRA Cricket Ground, Amstelveen
Umpires: Peter Nero (WI) and Chettithody Shamshuddin (Ind)

- No toss.
- No play was possible because of heavy rain with the match moved to the reserve day.
- No play was possible on the reserve day as well due to rain and a wet outfield with the match being abandoned without a ball bowled.

30 October 2015
Scorecard

Kenya; 287/7 (50 overs)	v	Namibia; 276 (49 overs)
Rakep Patel 80 (58); Gerrie Snyman 2/46 (10 overs)		Stephan Baard 132 (106); Shem Ngoche 3/53 (10 overs)

Kenya won by 11 runs
Wanderers Cricket Ground, Windhoek
Umpires: Adrian Holdstock (SA) and Wynand Louw (Nam)

- Kenya won the toss and elected to bat.

2 November 2015
Scorecard

Kenya; 215 (50 overs)	v	Namibia; 123 (38.3 overs)
Nelson Odhiambo 46 (81); Bernard Scholtz 2/31 (10 overs)		JJ Smit 31 (51); Rakep Patel 2/17 (4 overs)

Kenya won by 92 runs
Wanderers Cricket Ground, Windhoek
Umpires: Adrian Holdstock (SA) and Wynand Louw (Nam)

- Kenya won the toss and elected to bat.
- No play was possible because of wet outfield with the match moved to the reserve day.

16 November 2015
Scorecard

Hong Kong; 298/4 (50 overs)	v	United Arab Emirates; 209 (42.3 overs)
Mark Chapman 124* (116); Ahmed Raza 2/43 (10 overs)		Shaiman Anwar 76 (64); Anshuman Rath 3/22 (10 overs)

Hong Kong won by 89 runs
ICC Academy Ground, Dubai
Umpires: Vineet Kulkarni (Ind) and Sarika Prasad (Sin)
Player of the match: Mark Chapman (HK)

- Hong Kong won the toss and elected to bat.
- Christopher Carter, Mark Chapman (HK), Abdul Shakoor, Asif Iqbal, Yodhin Punja, Laxman Sreekumar, Umair Ali and Zaheer Maqsood (UAE) all made their ODI debuts.
- Mark Chapman scored the first ODI century for Hong Kong.

16 November 2015
Scorecard

Nepal; 232/8 (50 overs)	v	Papua New Guinea; 235/8 (49.3 overs)
Sharad Vesawkar 78 (82); Assad Vala 3/32 (7 overs)		Assad Vala 87 (107); Paras Khadka 2/29 (7 overs)

Papua New Guinea won by 2 wickets
Sheikh Zayed Cricket Stadium, Abu Dhabi
Umpires: Buddhi Pradhan (Nep) and Raveendra Wimalasiri (SL)

- Nepal won the toss and elected to bat.
- Mahaboob Alam and Irshad Ahamad (Nep) made their List A debuts.

18 November 2015
Scorecard

Hong Kong; 282/8 (50 overs)	v	United Arab Emirates; 146 (40.1 overs)
Tanwir Afzal 73 (33); Zaheer Maqsood 2/60 (10 overs)		Shaiman Anwar 71 (99); Tanwir Afzal 3/31 (10 overs)

Hong Kong won by 136 runs
ICC Academy Ground, Dubai
Umpires: Vineet Kulkarni (Ind) and Sarika Prasad (Sin)
Player of the match: Tanwir Afzal (HK)

- Hong Kong won the toss and elected to bat.
- Waqas Khan (HK), Qadeer Ahmed and Usman Mushtaq (UAE) all made their ODI debuts.

18 November 2015
Scorecard

Nepal; 224/8 (50 overs)	v	Papua New Guinea; 225/7 (49.4 overs)
Paras Khadka 58 (81); Assad Vala 3/36 (5 overs)		Jack Vare 76* (90); Sompal Kami 3/51 (8 overs)

Papua New Guinea won by 3 wickets
Sheikh Zayed Cricket Stadium, Abu Dhabi
Umpires: Buddhi Pradhan (Nep) and Raveendra Wimalasiri (SL)

- Nepal won the toss and elected to bat.
- Hiri Hiri (PNG) made his List A debut.

=== Round 3 ===
The fixtures for round three were announced in December 2015.

26 January 2016
Scorecard

Hong Kong; 259 (49.1 overs)	v	Scotland; 150 (39.1 overs)
Anshuman Rath 97 (136); Alasdair Evans 4/41 (10 overs)		Calum MacLeod 58 (78); Tanwir Afzal 3/20 (10 overs)

Hong Kong won by 109 runs
Mission Road Ground, Mong Kok
Umpires: Vineet Kulkarni (Ind) and Buddhi Pradhan (Nep)
Player of the match: Anshuman Rath (HK)

- Scotland won the toss and elected to field.
- Ishtiaq Muhammad (HK) and Bradley Wheal (Sco) both made their ODI debuts.
- This was the first ever ODI match to be played in Hong Kong.

27 January 2016
Scorecard

United Arab Emirates; 112 (36 overs)	v	Netherlands; 114/3 (20.3 overs)
Mohammad Shahzad 37 (78); Mudassar Bukhari 6/24 (10 overs)		Michael Swart 60* (67); Ahmed Raza 2/12 (5 overs)

Netherlands won by 7 wickets
Sheikh Zayed Cricket Stadium, Abu Dhabi
Umpires: C. K. Nandan (Ind) and Sarika Prasad (Sin)

- Netherlands won the toss and elected to field.
- Farhan Ahmed, Muhammad Usman and Muhammad Kaleem (UAE) all made their List A debuts.
- Mudassar Bukhari (Ned) recorded his best bowling figures in List A cricket with 6 for 24.

28 January 2016
Scorecard

Hong Kong	v	Scotland

Match abandoned
Mission Road Ground, Mong Kok
Umpires: Vineet Kulkarni (Ind) and Buddhi Pradhan (Nep)

- No toss.
- No play was possible because of rain with the match moved to the reserve day.
- No play was possible on the reserve day due to rain and the match was abandoned without a ball bowled.

29 January 2016
Scorecard

Netherlands; 216 (49.4 overs)	v	United Arab Emirates; 210 (49.3 overs)
Pieter Seelaar 49 (59); Manjula Guruge 3/41 (8 overs)		Shaiman Anwar 71 (98); Timm van der Gugten 3/44 (10 overs)

Netherlands won by 6 runs
Sheikh Zayed Cricket Stadium, Abu Dhabi
Umpires: C. K. Nandan (Ind) and Sarika Prasad (Sin)

- United Arab Emirates won the toss and elected to field.

16 April 2016
Scorecard

Namibia; 195/9 (50 overs)	v	Nepal; 197/5 (47.1 overs)
Sarel Burger 38 (77); Basant Regmi 3/40 (10 overs)		Sharad Vesawkar 50* (99); Sarel Burger 2/22 (9 overs)

Nepal won by 5 wickets
Tribhuvan University International Cricket Ground, Kirtipur
Umpires: Buddhi Pradhan (Nep) and Sharfuddoula (Ban)

- Namibia won the toss and elected to bat.
- Sandeep Lamichhane and Raju Rijal (both Nepal) made their List A debuts.

18 April 2016
Scorecard

Namibia; 239/9 (50 overs)	v	Nepal; 240/7 (49.5 overs)
Stephan Baard 51 (60); Sandeep Lamichhane 2/39 (9 overs)		Paras Khadka 103 (94); Sarel Burger 3/38 (10 overs)

Nepal won by 3 wickets
Tribhuvan University International Cricket Ground, Kirtipur
Umpires: Buddhi Pradhan (Nep) and Sharfuddoula (Ban)

- Nepal won the toss and elected to field.
- Paras Khadka (Nep) made his maiden List A century and his highest total in a List A match.

28 May 2016
Scorecard

Kenya; 188 (47 overs)	v	Papua New Guinea; 191/4 (34.3 overs)
Irfan Karim 73* (115); Chad Soper 5/27 (9 overs)		Assad Vala 69* (70); Nehemiah Odhiambo 2/31 (7 overs)

Papua New Guinea won by 6 wickets
Amini Park, Port Moresby
Umpires: Alu Kapa (PNG) and Mick Martell (Aus)

- Kenya won the toss and elected to bat.
- Alei Nao (PNG) made his List A debut.
- Chad Soper (PNG) took his first five-wicket haul in a List A match.

30 May 2016
Scorecard

Papua New Guinea; 249/6 (50 overs)	v	Kenya; 228 (47.5 overs)
Vani Morea 102* (142); Collins Obuya 4/42 (8 overs)		Rushab Patel 95 (117); John Reva 4/31 (8.5 overs)

Papua New Guinea won by 21 runs
Amini Park, Port Moresby
Umpires: Mick Martell (Aus) and Lakani Oala (PNG)

- Papua New Guinea won the toss and elected to bat.
- Rushab Patel (Ken) and Nosaina Pokana (PNG) both made their List A debuts.
- Vani Morea (PNG) scored his first century in a List A match.

=== Round 4 ===
The fixtures for round four were announced in April 2016. The venue for the fixtures in Kenya was confirmed in November 2016.

13 August 2016
Scorecard

Nepal; 94 (38.1 overs)	v	Netherlands; 96/3 (16.5 overs)
Anil Mandal 20 (39); Timm van der Gugten 3/21 (8 overs)		Wesley Barresi 37 (33); Sagar Pun 1/3 (2 overs)

Netherlands won by 7 wickets
VRA Cricket Ground, Amstelveen
Umpires: Roland Black (Ire) and Ashraf Din (Ned)

- Netherlands won the toss and elected to field.

14 August 2016
Scorecard

Scotland; 327/5 (50 overs)	v	United Arab Emirates; 229 (43.3 overs)
Kyle Coetzer 127 (121); Mohammad Shahzad 3/61 (7 overs)		Rohan Mustafa 43 (47); Alasdair Evans 4/41 (8 overs)

Scotland won by 98 runs
The Grange Club, Edinburgh
Umpires: Allan Haggo (Sco) and Mark Hawthorne (Ire)

- United Arab Emirates won the toss and elected to field.
- Allan Haggo (Sco) stood in his first One Day International match as an umpire.
- Rameez Shahzad and Muhammad Usman (UAE) both made their ODI debuts.
- Kyle Coetzer, Richie Berrington and Preston Mommsen all passed 1,000 runs in ODIs for Scotland.

15 August 2016
Scorecard

Nepal; 217/9 (50 overs)	v	Netherlands; 198 (48.3 overs)
Paras Khadka 84 (94); Michael Rippon 4/35 (6 overs)		Roelof van der Merwe 56 (61); Paras Khadka 2/19 (6 overs)

Nepal won by 19 runs
VRA Cricket Ground, Amstelveen
Umpires: Roland Black (Ire) and Huub Jansen (Ned)

- Netherlands won the toss and elected to field.

16 August 2016
Scorecard

United Arab Emirates; 228 (45.4 overs)	v	Scotland; 229/3 (47.4 overs)
Shaiman Anwar 63 (75); Safyaan Sharif 3/25 (8 overs)		Calum MacLeod 103 (122); Mohammad Naveed 4/42 (10 overs)

Scotland won by 7 wickets
The Grange Club, Edinburgh
Umpires: Allan Haggo (Sco) and Mark Hawthorne (Ire)

- United Arab Emirates won the toss and elected to bat.
- Chris Sole (Sco) made his ODI debut.

21 October 2016
Scorecard

Namibia; 273/4 (50 overs)	v	Papua New Guinea; 274/5 (48 overs)
Craig Williams 109* (89); Sese Bau 1/21 (3 overs)		Dogodo Bau 80 (74); Sarel Burger 1/35 (5 overs)

Papua New Guinea won by 5 wickets
Amini Park, Port Moresby
Umpires: Chris Brown (NZ) and Alu Kapa (PNG)

- Namibia won the toss and elected to bat.
- Dogodo Bau (PNG) made his List A debut.

23 October 2016
Scorecard

Namibia; 212 (50 overs)	v	Papua New Guinea; 213/4 (48 overs)
Nicolaas Scholtz 61* (88); Norman Vanua 3/38 (10 overs)		Vani Morea 67 (121); Sarel Burger 1/26 (4 overs)

Papua New Guinea won by 6 wickets
Amini Park, Port Moresby
Umpires: Chris Brown (NZ) and Alu Kapa (PNG)

- Namibia won the toss and elected to bat.

18 November 2016
Scorecard

Hong Kong; 222 (46.2 overs)	v	Kenya; 201/7 (40.5 overs)
Anshuman Rath 90 (92); Rakep Patel 5/16 (6 overs)		Irfan Karim 67 (92); Ehsan Khan 2/44 (9 overs)

Kenya won by 3 wickets (DLS method)
Gymkhana Club Ground, Nairobi
Umpires: Bongani Jele (SA) and David Odhiambo (Ken)
Player of the match: Rakep Patel (Ken)

- Kenya won the toss and elected to field.
- A rain delay in Kenya's innings set them a revised target of 200 runs from 43 overs.
- This was the first international match to be played in Kenya in four years.

20 November 2016
Scorecard

Hong Kong; 148/4 (25.1 overs)	v	Kenya; 133 (23 overs)
Babar Hayat 78 (68); Lucas Oluoch 3/29 (6.1 overs)		Alex Obanda 39 (38); Ehsan Khan 3/12 (4 overs)

Hong Kong won by 39 runs (DLS method)
Gymkhana Club Ground, Nairobi
Umpires: Bongani Jele (SA) and David Odhiambo (Ken)
Player of the match: Babar Hayat (HK)

- Kenya won the toss and elected to field.
- A rain delay before the toss reduced the match to 31 overs per side. A further rain delay set Kenya a revised target of 173 runs from 25 overs.

=== Round 5 ===
The fixtures between Hong Kong and the Netherlands were announced by the Koninklijke Nederlandse Cricket Bond in December 2016. Cricket Scotland confirmed the venue for their fixtures in February 2017.

16 February 2017
Scorecard

Netherlands; 330/7 (50 overs)	v	Hong Kong; 325/9 (50 overs)
Stephan Myburgh 88 (98); Ehsan Khan 2/49 (9 overs)		Anshuman Rath 134 (121); Michael Rippon 4/67 (10 overs)

Netherlands won by 5 runs
Mission Road Ground, Mong Kok
Umpires: Buddhi Pradhan (Nep) and Tabarak Dar (HK)
Player of the match: Michael Rippon (Ned)

- Netherlands won the toss and elected to bat.
- Anshuman Rath and Babar Hayat made 197 runs for the third wicket, a List A record for Hong Kong and a record for any wicket in a World Cricket League match.
- Anshuman Rath (HK) scored his maiden List A century.

18 February 2017
Scorecard

Netherlands; 314/9 (50 overs)	v	Hong Kong; 301/8 (50 overs)
Ben Cooper 78 (72); Ehsan Khan 3/59 (10 overs)		Babar Hayat 86 (80); Roelof van der Merwe 2/36 (9 overs)

Netherlands won by 13 runs
Mission Road Ground, Mong Kok
Umpires: Buddhi Pradhan (Nep) and Tabarak Dar (HK)
Player of the match: Michael Rippon (Ned)

- Netherlands won the toss and elected to bat.
- Shane Snater (Ned) made his List A debut.

11 March 2017
Scorecard

Nepal; 112/8 (36 overs)	v	Kenya; 98/5 (24.1 overs)
Gyanendra Malla 27 (35); Shem Ngoche 3/18 (6 overs)		Rakep Patel 34* (52); Sagar Pun 2/8 (4 overs)

Kenya won by 5 wickets (DLS method)
Tribhuvan University International Cricket Ground, Kirtipur
Umpires: Vinay Kumar Jha (Nep) and Sarika Prasad (Sin)

- Kenya won the toss and elected to field.
- Rain delays set Kenya a revised target of 94 runs from 26 overs.
- Dipendra Singh Airee and Sunil Dhamala (Nep) both made their List A debuts.

13 March 2017
Scorecard

Kenya; 155 (46.1 overs)	v	Nepal; 160/3 (30.2 overs)
Collins Obuya 48 (78); Sharad Vesawkar 4/28 (7.1 overs)		Gyanendra Malla 64* (93); Elijah Otieno 2/29 (6 overs)

Nepal won by 7 wickets
Tribhuvan University International Cricket Ground, Kirtipur
Umpires: Vinay Kumar Jha (Nep) and Sarika Prasad (Sin)

- Nepal won the toss and elected to field.

31 March 2017
Scorecard

United Arab Emirates; 292/5 (50 overs)	v	Papua New Guinea; 210 (47.3 overs)
Rameez Shahzad 87 (82); Alei Nao 2/47 (10 overs)		Tony Ura 61 (87); Imran Haider 4/49 (10 overs)

United Arab Emirates won by 82 runs
Sheikh Zayed Cricket Stadium, Abu Dhabi
Umpires: Akbar Ali (UAE) and Shozab Raza (Pak)

- Papua New Guinea won the toss and elected to field.
- Alei Nao and Nosaina Pokana (PNG) both made their ODI debuts.

2 April 2017
Scorecard

Papua New Guinea; 232/8 (50 overs)	v	United Arab Emirates; 206 (47.4 overs)
Vani Morea 52 (66); Imran Haider 2/31 (10 overs)		Ghulam Shabber 70 (100); Assad Vala 3/20 (10 overs)

Papua New Guinea won by 26 runs
Sheikh Zayed Cricket Stadium, Abu Dhabi
Umpires: Akbar Ali (UAE) and Shozab Raza (Pak)

- Papua New Guinea won the toss and elected to bat.

11–12 June 2017
Scorecard

Scotland; 268/5 (43 overs)	v	Namibia; 217 (39.4 overs)
Richie Berrington 110 (90); JJ Smit 2/43 (9 overs)		Gerhard Erasmus 35 (58); Safyaan Sharif 3/40 (8.4 overs)

Scotland won by 51 runs (DLS method)
The Grange Club, Edinburgh
Umpires: Allan Haggo (Sco) and Sharfuddoula (Ban)

- Namibia won the toss and elected to field.
- Rain during Scotland's innings reduced the match to 43 overs per side.
- Further rain stopped play during Namibia's innings and the match continued on the reserve day.

13 June 2017
Scorecard

Namibia; 324/5 (50 overs)	v	Scotland; 274/9 (50 overs)
Stephan Baard 78 (53); Mark Watt 2/45 (6 overs)		Kyle Coetzer 112 (122); Jan Frylinck 3/45 (8 overs)

Namibia won by 50 runs
The Grange Club, Edinburgh
Umpires: Allan Haggo (Sco) and Sharfuddoula (Ban)

- Namibia won the toss and elected to bat.

=== Round 6 ===
The matches between Kenya and the Netherlands were originally scheduled to be held at the Gymkhana Club Ground in Nairobi. However, they were moved to Buffalo Park, East London, South Africa, due to security concerns ahead of the re-running of the Kenyan presidential election.

21 September 2017
Scorecard

Namibia; 89 (28.3 overs)	v	United Arab Emirates; 92/4 (25.1 overs)
Louis van der Westhuizen 41 (46); Ahmed Raza 3/18 (7.3 overs)		Chirag Suri 26 (65); Bernard Scholtz 2/24 (6.1 overs)

United Arab Emirates won by 6 wickets
Wanderers Cricket Ground, Windhoek
Umpires: Bongani Jele (SA) and Claude Thorburn (Nam)

- United Arab Emirates won the toss and elected to field.
- Petrus Burger (Nam) made his List A debut.

23 September 2017
Scorecard

United Arab Emirates; 272/7 (50 overs)	v	Namibia; 274/6 (48.5 overs)
Rohan Mustafa 96 (113); Jan Frylinck 3/37 (10 overs)		Gerhard Erasmus 77 (84); Shaiman Anwar 1/19 (4 overs)

Namibia won by 4 wickets
Wanderers Cricket Ground, Windhoek
Umpires: Bongani Jele (SA) and Claude Thorburn (Nam)

- United Arab Emirates won the toss and elected to bat.
- Both Namibia and the United Arab Emirates were relegated to Division Two following this round of matches.

6 October 2017
Scorecard

Scotland; 278/9 (50 overs)	v	Papua New Guinea; 177 (43.3 overs)
Calum MacLeod 154 (163); Alei Nao 3/40 (10 overs)		Tony Ura 42 (52); Michael Leask 2/26 (7 overs)

Scotland won by 101 runs
Amini Park, Port Moresby
Umpires: Sam Nogajski (Aus) and Lakani Oala (PNG)

- Scotland won the toss and elected to bat
- Stuart Whittingham (Sco) made his ODI debut.

6 October 2017
Scorecard

Kenya; 226/7 (50 overs)	v	Netherlands; 227/4 (48.5 overs)
Collins Obuya 70 (76); Michael Rippon 3/30 (10 overs)		Peter Borren 86* (98); Shem Ngoche 2/47 (10 overs)

Netherlands won by 6 wickets
Buffalo Park, East London
Umpires: Isaac Oyieko (Ken) and Langton Rusere (Zim)

- Netherlands won the toss and elected to field.
- Pushpak Kerai (Ken) made his List A debut.

8 October 2017
Scorecard

Scotland; 203 (49.2 overs)	v	Papua New Guinea; 204/5 (48 overs)
Matthew Cross 91 (120); Mahuru Dai 2/19 (10 overs)		Mahuru Dai 63* (54); Alasdair Evans 2/47 (7 overs)

Papua New Guinea won by 5 wickets
Amini Park, Port Moresby
Umpires: Sam Nogajski (Aus) and Lakani Oala (PNG)

- Scotland won the toss and elected to bat.

8 October 2017
Scorecard

Netherlands; 224/9 (50 overs)	v	Kenya; 225/8 (49.3 overs)
Wesley Barresi 69 (74); Shem Ngoche 4/33 (10 overs)		Dhiren Gondaria 63 (61); Peter Borren 2/13 (5 overs)

Kenya won by 2 wickets
Buffalo Park, East London
Umpires: David Odhiambo (Ken) and Langton Rusere (Zim)

- Kenya won the toss and elected to field.

13 October 2017
Scorecard

Hong Kong; 194 (50 overs)	v	Nepal; 111 (34.5 overs)
Jamie Atkinson 76 (117); Sandeep Lamichhane 3/48 (10 overs)		Paras Khadka 26 (46); Ehsan Khan 5/17 (5.5 overs)

Hong Kong won by 83 runs
Mission Road Ground, Mong Kok
Umpires: Sharfuddoula (Ban) and Ian Thomson (HK)
Player of the match: Jamie Atkinson (HK)

- Nepal won the toss and elected to field.
- Sushan Bhari (Nep) made his List A debut.

15–16 October 2017
Scorecard

Hong Kong	v	Nepal

Match abandoned
Mission Road Ground, Mong Kok
Umpires: Sharfuddoula (Ban) and Ian Thomson (HK)

- No toss.
- No play was possible because of Typhoon Khanun with the match moved to the reserve day.
- No play was possible on the reserve day due to rain and the match was abandoned without a ball bowled.
- Nepal were relegated to Division Two as a result of this match.

=== Round 7 ===
The fixtures for Round 7 were announced after the conclusion of the final game in Round 6. The ICC confirmed all the squads and match officials for the fixtures on 5 December 2017.

6 December 2017
Scorecard

Kenya; 140 (46.2 overs)	v	Scotland; 145/2 (28 overs)
Collins Obuya 26 (50); Safyaan Sharif 3/33 (9.2 overs)		Calum MacLeod 56* (75); Emmanuel Bundi 1/33 (6 overs)

Scotland won by 8 wickets
Dubai International Cricket Stadium, Dubai
Umpires: Tabarak Dar (HK) and Nigel Duguid (WI)
Player of the match: Kyle Coetzer (Sco)

- Scotland won the toss and elected to field.

6 December 2017
Scorecard

Nepal; 221/6 (50 overs)	v	United Arab Emirates; 225/3 (45.5 overs)
Sharad Vesawkar 81* (95); Zahoor Khan 2/48 (10 overs)		Ghulam Shabber 81* (116); Sharad Vesawkar 1/14 (4 overs)

United Arab Emirates won by 7 wickets
Sheikh Zayed Cricket Stadium, Abu Dhabi
Umpires: David Odhiambo (Ken) and Ahsan Raza (Pak)
Player of the match: Ghulam Shabber (UAE)

- United Arab Emirates won the toss and elected to field.
- Amir Hayat, Mohammad Boota, Ashfaq Ahmed (United Arab Emirates), Dilip Nath and Lalit Bhandari (Nepal) all made their List A debuts.

6 December 2017
Scorecard

Hong Kong; 230/8 (50 overs)	v	Papua New Guinea; 207 (47 overs)
Babar Hayat 77 (120); Mahuru Dai 2/34 (10 overs)		Mahuru Dai 60 (76); Tanwir Afzal 2/31 (9 overs)

Hong Kong won by 23 runs
ICC Academy 1, Dubai
Umpires: Buddhi Pradhan (Nep) and Sharfuddoula (Ban)
Player of the match: Babar Hayat (HK)

- Papua New Guinea won the toss and elected to field.
- Scott McKechnie (HK) made his ODI debut.

6 December 2017
Scorecard

Namibia; 269/8 (50 overs)	v	Netherlands; 270/2 (41.1 overs)
Louis van der Westhuizen 54 (61); Roelof van der Merwe 3/54 (10 overs)		Ben Cooper 109* (111); Bernard Scholtz 1/49 (8 overs)

Netherlands won by 8 wickets
ICC Academy 2, Dubai
Umpires: Alu Kapa (PNG) and Nitin Menon (Ind)
Player of the match: Ben Cooper (Ned)

- Netherlands won the toss and elected to field.
- Wesley Barresi and Ben Cooper (Ned) made the highest partnership for any wicket in the World Cricket League (236).
- Ben Cooper scored his first century in List A cricket and Wesley Barresi became the leading run-scorer for the Netherlands in List A cricket.

8 December 2017
Scorecard

Scotland; 266/8 (50 overs)	v	Kenya; 105 (33.2 overs)
Kyle Coetzer 121 (130); Emmanuel Bundi 3/60 (8 overs)		Dhiren Gondaria 38 (36); Chris Sole 4/24 (10 overs)

Scotland won by 161 runs
Dubai International Cricket Stadium, Dubai
Umpires: Roland Black (Ire) and Nigel Duguid (WI)
Player of the match: Kyle Coetzer (Sco)

- Kenya won the toss and elected to field.

8 December 2017
Scorecard

United Arab Emirates; 195 (49.2 overs)	v	Nepal; 132 (42.2 overs)
Adnan Mufti 104 (89); Sompal Kami 5/27 (10 overs)		Gyanendra Malla 42 (90); Amjad Javed 3/23 (7.2 overs)

United Arab Emirates won by 63 runs
Sheikh Zayed Cricket Stadium, Abu Dhabi
Umpires: David Odhiambo (Ken) and Ahsan Raza (Pak)
Player of the match: Adnan Mufti (UAE)

- Nepal won the toss and elected to field.
- Adnan Mufti (UAE) made his first century in List A cricket.
- Sompal Kami (Nep) took his first five-wicket haul in List A cricket.

8 December 2017
Scorecard

Hong Kong; 323/4 (50 overs)	v	Papua New Guinea; 230 (42.2 overs)
Anshuman Rath 143* (137); John Reva 2/46 (10 overs)		Kiplin Doriga 89* (90); Ehsan Nawaz 4/54 (10 overs)

Hong Kong won by 93 runs
ICC Academy 1, Dubai
Umpires: Buddhi Pradhan (Nep) and Sharfuddoula (Ban)
Player of the match: Anshuman Rath (HK)

- Papua New Guinea won the toss and elected to field.
- Anshuman Rath (HK) scored his first century and the highest score by a Hong Kong batsman in ODIs.
- This was Hong Kong's highest total in ODIs.

8 December 2017
Scorecard

Namibia; 181 (36.4 overs)	v	Netherlands; 182/5 (41.1 overs)
Gerhard Erasmus 81 (75); Vivian Kingma 6/39 (9 overs)		Ryan ten Doeschate 65* (58); Sarel Burger 2/18 (8 overs)

Netherlands won by 5 wickets
ICC Academy 2, Dubai
Umpires: Alu Kapa (PNG) and Nitin Menon (Ind)
Player of the match: Vivian Kingma (Ned)

- Netherlands won the toss and elected to field.
- Scott Edwards (Ned) made his List A debut.
- Vivian Kingma (Ned) took a hat-trick and his first five-wicket haul in List A cricket.

== Statistics ==
=== Most runs ===
Player	Team	Mat	Inns	Runs	Ave	SR	HS	100	50	4s	6s
Anshuman Rath	Hong Kong	10	10	678	75.33	89.32	143*	2	4	57	9
Kyle Coetzer	Scotland	12	11	574	52.18	90.25	127	3	1	64	7
Babar Hayat	Hong Kong	12	11	543	49.36	87.15	89	0	5	43	17
Sese Bau	Papua New Guinea	13	13	446	37.16	71.47	76	0	3	43	3
Calum MacLeod	Scotland	10	9	440	55.00	80.14	154	2	2	43	6
Last updated: 8 December 2017

=== Most wickets ===
Player	Team	Mat	Inns	Wkts	Ave	Econ	BBI	SR	4WI	5WI
Nadeem Ahmed	Hong Kong	11	11	24	15.25	3.96	4/26	23.0	2	0
Alasdair Evans	Scotland	12	12	24	18.54	4.37	4/41	25.4	2	0
Michael Rippon	Netherlands	11	10	23	16.08	4.55	4/35	21.1	2	0
Norman Vanua	Papua New Guinea	11	11	23	21.21	5.08	3/38	25.0	0	0
Safyaan Sharif	Scotland	12	12	19	22.68	4.56	3/25	29.7	0	0
Last updated: 8 December 2017
