= Overgangsklasse (cricket) =

- Administrator: Koninklijke Nederlandse Cricket Bond
- Format: Limited overs cricket
- Tournament format: two pools of eight-team division home and away in 1-day matches
- Number of teams: 2 x 8

The Overgangsklasse is the fourth highest domestic cricket competition in the Netherlands. There are two pools, Overgangsklasse A (OVA) and Overgangsklasse B (OVB) playing in the regular competition. This overgangs level can be loosely translated as 'transition' between the comparatively less competitive lower leagues (Tweede Klasse, Derde Klasse, etc.) and the more professional higher leagues (Eerste Klasse, Hoofdklasse and Topklasse). All leagues higher than Overgangsklasse are conducted at the national level.

== Competition Structure ==
The two pools, OVA and OVB, have 8 teams each which play a round robin home and away league. The matches are played with each inning limited to 40 overs. The champions in each of the pools get promoted to the Eerste Klasse while the bottom team in each pool gets relegated to the Tweede Klasse.

== Recent years ==
The Overgangsklasse champions for the recent years are shown below.

Year	Champion OVA	Champion OVB
2017	PSV Eindhoven 1	ASC Ajax 1
2016	Ghausia CC Feijenoord 1	HBS 2
2015	Wanica Star 1	Salland CC 1
2014	Quick Haag 2	Qui Vive 1
2013	Excelsior'20 2	USV Hercules 1
