= Lakani Oala =

Papua New Guinean cricket umpire

Personal information
- Full name: Lakani Oala
- Born: 13 September 1959 (age 67); Port Moresby, Papua New Guinea

Umpiring information
- ODIs umpired: 6 (2017–2022)
- T20Is umpired: 5 (2024)
- WODIs umpired: 11 (2009–2025)
- WT20Is umpired: 10 (2019–2025)
- Source: ESPN Cricinfo, 20 September 2022

Lakani Oala (born 13 September 1959) is a cricket umpire from Papua New Guinea, who is currently on the ICC Associates and Affiliates Umpire Panel. Oala has stood in matches in the 2015–17 ICC World Cricket League Championship. In October 2016 he was selected as one of the eight umpires to stand in matches in the 2016 ICC World Cricket League Division Four tournament. He stood in his first One Day International (ODI) on 6 October 2017, in the match between Papua New Guinea and Scotland in the 2015–17 ICC World Cricket League Championship. He had officiated in 5 ODIs by September 2022.

== See also ==
- List of One Day International cricket umpires
- List of Twenty20 International cricket umpires
