= Brad Wheal =

Scottish cricketer (born 1996)

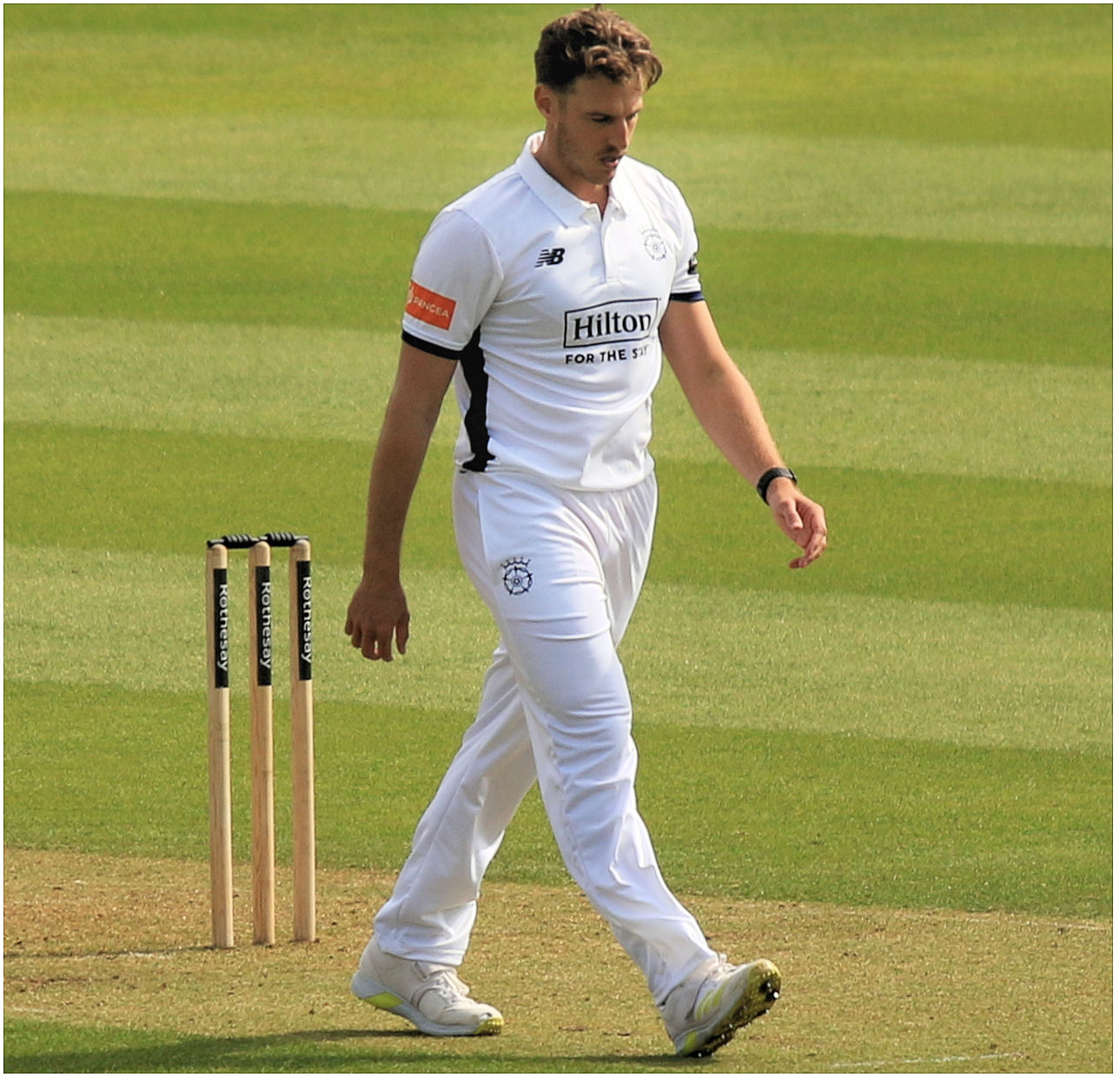
- Wheal in 2025

Personal information
- Full name: Bradley Thomas James Wheal
- Born: 28 August 1996 (age 30); Durban, KwaZulu-Natal, South Africa
- Batting: Right-handed
- Bowling: Right-arm fast medium
- Role: Bowler

International information
- National side: Scotland (2016–2026)
- ODI debut (cap 57): 26 January 2016 v Hong Kong
- Last ODI: 4 November 2024 v Nepal
- ODI shirt no.: 58
- T20I debut (cap 43): 30 January 2016 v Hong Kong
- Last T20I: 17 February 2026 v Nepal

Domestic team information
- Years: Team
- 2015–2026: Hampshire (squad no. 58)
- 2021–2022: London Spirit
- 2022: → Gloucestershire (on loan)
- 2022: → Warwickshire (on loan)
- 2023: Trent Rockets
- 2024: → Glamorgan (on loan)

Career statistics
Competition	ODI	T20I	FC	LA
Matches	18	26	59	52
Runs scored	49	20	619	147
Batting average	8.16	6.66	12.38	9.18
100s/50s	0/0	0/0	0/1	0/0
Top score	24	8*	61	24
Balls bowled	873	518	8,355	2,362
Wickets	27	24	140	77
Bowling average	23.07	30.95	34.56	26.66
5 wickets in innings	0	0	1	1
10 wickets in match	0	0	0	0
Best bowling	3/34	3/20	6/51	5/47
Catches/stumpings	3/–	10/–	19/–	10/–
- Source: Cricinfo, 15 July 2026

Bradley Thomas James Wheal (born 28 August 1996) is a South African-born Scottish former cricketer. A right-handed fast medium bowler who batted right-handed, he played for the Scotland national cricket team from 2016 until 2026. Wheal also played for several clubs in English county cricket.

== Early life ==
Wheal was born in Durban, South Africa, on 28 August 1996 to a Scottish mother. He attended Clifton School in Durban, where he matriculated in December 2014. He began his cricketing career with the Kwazulu-Natal youth teams, where he played up to under-19 level. He also represented the province in youth field hockey. While playing under-19 cricket, he was spotted by Hampshire coach Dale Benkenstein, who is also an assistant coach with the Dolphins in Durban.

== Domestic career ==
Wheal impressed Benkestein and was offered a development contract with Hampshire for the 2015 season due to a shortage of fast bowlers at the county, with only Chris Wood and Tom Barber as available backups to the first team side.

Wheal impressed greatly in pre-season, performing well in games on the tour of Barbados and in a friendly against Kent. A strong performance then against Middlesex 2nd XI for Hampshire's 2nd XI where he took 10 wickets in the match and earned himself a call up to the first team for the match against Middlesex on 17 May 2015. Hampshire batted first in this match where Wheal batted at number 10 finishing 3 not out. In Middlesex's 1st innings Wheal took the wicket of opener Sam Robson for 10 runs by bowling him out. He finished with figures of 1/97 from his 20 overs as Middlesex where bowled out for 362. The match, which was rain affected, would end in a draw.

In April 2022, he was bought by the London Spirit for the 2022 season of The Hundred.

== International career ==
Wheal holds a British passport through his parentage. After joining Hampshire, he expressed an interest in representing England upon fulfilling the residential qualifications.

Wheal is qualified to represent Scotland through his mother. In August 2015 he played for a Scotland XI against MCC at Titwood, Glasgow, taking seven wickets. He was subsequently fast-tracked to selection for the full Scotland team, and in December 2015 was named in the squad for the tour of Hong Kong, that took place the following month.

He made his One Day International debut for Scotland against Hong Kong in the 2015–17 ICC World Cricket League Championship on 26 January 2016. He made his Twenty20 International debut for Scotland against Hong Kong on 30 January 2016.

In September 2021, Wheal was named in Scotland's provisional squad for the 2021 ICC Men's T20 World Cup.

In May 2024, he was named in Scotland's squad for the 2024 ICC Men's T20 World Cup tournament.

== Retirement ==
On 16 October 2026, Wheal announced his retirement from professional cricket stating that multiple injuries, including four stress fractures in his back and a knee problem which had required surgery, meant "my body can't cope with the demands of fast bowling anymore."
