= Mark Montfort =

Canadian cricketer (born 1985)

Personal information
- Born: 30 January 1985 (age 41); Georgetown, Guyana

International information
- National side: Canada
- Only T20I (cap 50): 25 August 2019 v United States
- Source: Cricinfo, 25 August 2019

Mark Montfort (born 30 January 1985) is a Guyanese-Canadian cricketer. He made his Twenty20 International (T20I) debut for Canada against the United States in the Regional Finals of the 2018–19 ICC T20 World Cup Americas Qualifier tournament on 25 August 2019. Prior to his T20I debut, he was selected to play for the Toronto Nationals franchise team in the 2019 Global T20 Canada tournament.
