= Rodrigo Thomas =

Canadian cricketer (born 1991)

Personal information
- Full name: Rodrigo Thomas
- Born: 24 January 1991 (age 35)

International information
- National side: Canada
- T20I debut (cap 48): 18 August 2019 v Cayman Islands
- Last T20I: 24 October 2019 v Hong Kong
- Source: Cricinfo, 24 October 2019

Rodrigo Thomas (born 24 January 1991) is a Canadian cricketer. In September 2018, he was named in Canada's squad for the 2018–19 ICC World Twenty20 Americas Qualifier tournament. He made his List A debut for Canada in the 2018–19 Regional Super50 tournament on 3 October 2018.

In April 2019, he was named in Canada's squad for the 2019 ICC World Cricket League Division Two tournament in Namibia. In June 2019, he was selected to play for the Toronto Nationals franchise team in the 2019 Global T20 Canada tournament.

In August 2019, he was named in Canada's squad for the Regional Finals of the 2018–19 ICC T20 World Cup Americas Qualifier tournament. He made his Twenty20 International (T20I) debut for Canada against the Cayman Islands on 18 August 2019. In September 2019, he was named in Canada's squad for the 2019 Malaysia Cricket World Cup Challenge League A tournament. In October 2019, he was named in Canada's squad for the 2019 ICC T20 World Cup Qualifier tournament in the United Arab Emirates.
