= 2019 Global T20 Canada =

Second edition of the Global T20 Canada

- Dates: 25 July – 11 August 2019
- Administrator: Cricket Canada
- Cricket format: Twenty20
- Tournament format(s): Round-robin and playoffs
- Champions: Winnipeg Hawks (1st title)
- Participants: 6
- Matches: 22
- Player of the series: JP Duminy (Winnipeg Hawks)
- Most runs: JP Duminy (Winnipeg Hawks) (332)
- Most wickets: Ish Sodhi (Brampton Wolves) (12)
- Official website: www.gt20.ca

The 2019 Global T20 Canada was the second edition of the Global T20 Canada, a professional Twenty20 cricket tournament that was played at the CAA Centre, Brampton in Ontario, Canada. It started on 25 July 2019, and concluded with the final on 11 August 2019. It was slightly later in the calendar than the previous edition of the tournament, to avoid clashing with the 2019 Cricket World Cup. Vancouver Knights were the defending champions. A new team named New York Legends were announced to replace Cricket West Indies B Team. However, the idea was later cancelled, and the Brampton Wolves were named as the sixth franchise team in June 2019.

On 26 July 2019, the start of the match between Montreal Tigers and Winnipeg Hawks was delayed by 90 minutes due to a bomb threat, when a suspicious package was found in the venue. The package was removed, with the match being reduced to twelve overs per side.

The final, between the Winnipeg Hawks and the Vancouver Knights, finished in a tie. Winnipeg Hawks won the match in the Super Over, to win their first title.

== Teams and squads ==
The following teams, squads and coaches were announced for the tournament. More than 1,000 cricketers from 42 nations were on the list for the players' draft.

Brampton Wolves Coach Phil Simmons	Edmonton Royals Coach: Stephen Fleming	Montreal Tigers Coach: Tom Moody	Toronto Nationals Coach: Geoff Lawson	Vancouver Knights Coach: Donovan Miller	Winnipeg Hawks Coach: Lalchand Rajput
Darren Sammy (c); Shahid Afridi; Andre Fletcher; ~~Shakib Al Hasan~~; Babar Hayat; Faisal Jamkhandi; Armaan Kapoor; Abraash Khan; Zahoor Khan; Nitish Kumar; Colin Munro; George Munsey; Rohan Mustafa; ~~Timil Patel~~; Cecil Pervez; Wahab Riaz; Junaid Siddiqui; Lendl Simmons; Nawab Singh; Ish Sodhi	Mohammad Hafeez (c); Shahid Ahmadzai; Richie Berrington; Ben Cutting; Navneet Dhaliwal; Satsimranjit Dhindsa; Akash Gill; ~~Davy Jacobs~~; Shadab Khan; Ehsan Nawaz; Mohammad Nawaz; James Neesham; Kyle Phillip; Faf du Plessis; Anshuman Rath; Sherfane Rutherford; Safyaan Sharif; Kane Williamson	George Bailey (c); Sean Abbott; Fawad Ahmed; Kyle Coetzer; Dinesh Chandimal; Matthew Cross; Ashtan Deosammy; Anton Devcich; Niroshan Dickwella; Nikhil Dutta; Alasdair Evans; Ruvindu Gunasekera; Dillon Heyliger; Arslan Khan; Nizakat Khan; Scott Kuggeleijn; Sunil Narine; Mohammad Naveed; Yax Patel; Keemo Paul; Thisara Perera; Bhupinder Singh; ~~Steven Taylor~~; Isuru Udana	Yuvraj Singh (c); Trent Boult; Manpreet Gony; Jeremy Gordon; Chris Green; Moises Henriques; Heinrich Klaasen; Sandeep Lamichhane; Calum MacLeod; Mitchell McClenaghan; Brendon McCullum; Mark Montfort; Salman Nazar; Kieron Pollard; Zishawn Qureshi; Ghulam Shabber; ~~Jasdeep Singh~~; Ravinderpal Singh; Chirag Suri; Rodrigo Thomas	Shoaib Malik (c); Asif Ali; Saad Bin Zafar; Rizwan Cheema; Rassie van der Dussen; Chris Gayle; Ali Khan; Matthew Nandu; Maahil Arshad; Rayyan Pathan; Andile Phehlukwayo; Michael Rippon; Andre Russell; Daniel Sams; JJ Smit; Tim Southee; Aaron Summers; Harsh Thaker; Tobias Visee; Hayden Walsh Jr.; Chadwick Walton	Rayad Emrit (c); Umar Akmal; Shaiman Anwar; Dwayne Bravo; JP Duminy; Romesh Eranga; Umair Ghani; Mohammad Irfan; Sompal Kami; Chris Lynn; Kaleem Sana; Varun Sehdev; Rameez Shahzad; Dwayne Smith; Sunny Sohal; Hamza Tariq; Paul van Meekeren; Najibullah Zadran

In July 2019, Steven Taylor, Jasdeep Singh and Timil Patel withdrew from the tournament, after signing central contracts with USA Cricket. In early August, the majority of the Emirati cricketers were recalled to play in the Twenty20 International (T20I) series against the Netherlands. On 5 August 2019, Brendon McCullum announced his retirement from cricket, with the tournament being his final matches.

== Points table ==
Team	Pld	W	L	T	NR	Pts	NRR
Brampton Wolves	6	4	1	0	1	9	+1.951
Vancouver Knights	6	3	1	0	2	8	+0.769
Toronto Nationals	6	3	3	0	0	6	+0.271
Winnipeg Hawks	6	2	3	0	1	5	–0.722
Montreal Tigers	6	2	3	0	1	5	–1.667
Edmonton Royals	6	1	4	0	1	3	–0.548

- The top four teams qualified for the playoffs
- Advanced to Playoff 1
- Advanced to Knockout

== League stage ==
The full fixtures were confirmed on 25 June 2019.

=== Round 1 ===
25 July 2019
12:30
Scorecard

Toronto Nationals; 159/5 (20 overs)	v	Vancouver Knights; 162/2 (17.2 overs)
Heinrich Klaasen 41 (20); Saad Bin Zafar 1/7 (2 overs)		Rassie van der Dussen 65* (43); Mark Montfort 1/33 (4 overs)

Vancouver Knights won by 8 wickets
CAA Centre, Brampton
Umpires: Bijal Patel (Can) and Leslie Reifer (WI)
Player of the match: Chadwick Walton (Vancouver Knights)

- Vancouver Knights won the toss and elected to field.

26 July 2019
16:30 (D/N)
Scorecard

Montreal Tigers; 135/3 (12 overs)	v	Winnipeg Hawks; 111/5 (12 overs)
Sunil Narine 59 (30); Dwayne Bravo 1/16 (3 overs)		Umar Akmal 49 (30); Mohammad Naveed 2/26 (3 overs)

Montreal Tigers won by 24 runs
CAA Centre, Brampton
Umpires: Arnold Maddela (Can) and Carl Tuckett (WI)
Player of the match: Sunil Narine (Montreal Tigers)

- Winnipeg Hawks won the toss and elected to field.
- The match was reduced to 12 overs per side due to a bomb threat.

27 July 2019
12:30
Scorecard

Edmonton Royals; 191/6 (19 overs)	v	Toronto Nationals; 192/8 (17.5 overs)
Ben Cutting 43* (24); Chris Green 3/33 (4 overs)		Heinrich Klaasen 45 (39); Shadab Khan 2/42 (4 overs)

Toronto Nationals won by 2 wickets
CAA Centre, Brampton
Umpires: Harry Grewal (Can) and Vishal Sudhalkar (Can)
Player of the match: Manpreet Gony (Toronto Nationals)

- Toronto Nationals won the toss and elected to field.
- The match was reduced to 19 overs per side due to rain.

27 July 2019
16:30 (D/N)
Scorecard

Montreal Tigers; 101 (18.2 overs)	v	Brampton Wolves; 102/0 (6.4 overs)
Kyle Coetzer 26 (18); Ish Sodhi 5/8 (4 overs)		George Munsey 63* (24)

Brampton Wolves won by 10 wickets
CAA Centre, Brampton
Umpires: Arnold Maddela (Can) and Bijal Patel (Can)
Player of the match: Ish Sodhi (Brampton Wolves)

- Montreal Tigers won the toss and elected to bat.

28 July 2019
12:30
Scorecard

Vancouver Knights; 208/5 (20 overs)	v	Winnipeg Hawks; 210/3 (15.2 overs)
Chris Gayle 45 (27); Rayad Emrit 3/40 (4 overs)		JP Duminy 77* (38); Ali Khan 1/42 (3 overs)

Winnipeg Hawks won by 7 wickets
CAA Centre, Brampton
Umpires: Leslie Reifer (WI) and Vishal Sudhalkar (Can)
Player of the match: JP Duminy (Winnipeg Hawks)

- Winnipeg Hawks won the toss and elected to field.

28 July 2019
16:30 (D/N)
Scorecard

Brampton Wolves; 207/5 (20 overs)	v	Edmonton Royals; 180/9 (20 overs)
Shahid Afridi 81* (40); Shadab Khan 3/34 (4 overs)		James Neesham 33 (18); Zahoor Khan 3/21 (3 overs)

Brampton Wolves won by 27 runs
CAA Centre, Brampton
Umpires: Bijal Patel (Can) and Carl Tuckett (WI)
Player of the match: Shahid Afridi (Brampton Wolves)

- Brampton Wolves won the toss and elected to bat.

29 July 2019
12:30
Scorecard

Toronto Nationals; 216/7 (20 overs)	v	Winnipeg Hawks; 217/7 (20 overs)
Rodrigo Thomas 65 (46); Dwayne Bravo 4/39 (4 overs)		Chris Lynn 89 (48); Chris Green 2/40 (4 overs)

Winnipeg Hawks won by 3 wickets
CAA Centre, Brampton
Umpires: Leslie Reifer (WI) and Vishal Sudhalkar (Can)
Player of the match: Chris Lynn (Winnipeg Hawks)

- Winnipeg Hawks won the toss and elected to field.

29 July 2019
16:30 (D/N)
Scorecard

Vancouver Knights; 276/3 (20 overs)	v	Montreal Tigers
Chris Gayle 122* (54); Dillon Heyliger 1/47 (3 overs)

No result
CAA Centre, Brampton
Umpires: Harry Grewal (Can) and Carl Tuckett (WI)

- Montreal Tigers won the toss and elected to field.
- No play was possible after Vancouver Knight's innings due to rain.

31 July 2019
12:30
Scorecard

Edmonton Royals; 153 (19.3 overs)	v	Montreal Tigers; 154/6 (19.4 overs)
Faf du Plessis 55 (20); Dillon Heyliger 3/14 (4 overs)		Kyle Coetzer 62 (52); Kyle Phillip 4/38 (4 overs)

Montreal Tigers won by 4 wickets
CAA Centre, Brampton
Umpires: Harry Grewal (Can) and Arnold Maddela (Can)
Player of the match: Dillon Heyliger (Montreal Tigers)

- Montreal Tigers won the toss and elected to field.

1 August 2019
12:30
Scorecard

Winnipeg Hawks; 116 (18.5 overs)	v	Brampton Wolves; 122/3 (14.3 overs)
Shaiman Anwar 31 (18); Ish Sodhi 2/16 (4 overs)		Colin Munro 53* (31); Mohammad Irfan 2/27 (4 overs)

Brampton Wolves won by 7 wickets
CAA Centre, Brampton
Umpires: Vishal Sudhalkar (Can) and Carl Tuckett (WI)
Player of the match: Colin Munro (Brampton Wolves)

- Brampton Wolves won the toss and elected to field.

2 August 2019
12:30
Scorecard

Edmonton Royals; 165/9 (20 overs)	v	Vancouver Knights; 166/4 (16.3 overs)
Ben Cutting 72 (41); Hayden Walsh Jr. 2/20 (4 overs)		Chris Gayle 94 (44); Ben Cutting 3/27 (4 overs)

Vancouver Knights won by 6 wickets
CAA Centre, Brampton
Umpires: Harry Grewal (Can) and Verdayne Smith (WI)
Player of the match: Chris Gayle (Vancouver Knights)

- Vancouver Knights won the toss and elected to field.

3 August 2019
12:30
Scorecard

Brampton Wolves; 222/6 (20 overs)	v	Toronto Nationals; 211/7 (20 overs)
George Munsey 66 (36); Yuvraj Singh 1/14 (2 overs)		Yuvraj Singh 51 (22); Nawab Singh 2/41 (3 overs)

Brampton Wolves won by 11 runs
CAA Centre, Brampton
Umpires: Bijal Patel (Can) and Verdayne Smith (WI)
Player of the match: George Munsey (Brampton Wolves)

- Toronto Nationals won the toss and elected to field.

3 August 2019
16:30 (D/N)
Scorecard

Winnipeg Hawks; 195/6 (20 overs)	v	Edmonton Royals; 198/2 (17.4 overs)
Shaiman Anwar 62 (35); Shadab Khan 3/23 (4 overs)		Anshuman Rath 87* (50); Kaleem Sana 1/25 (2 overs)

Edmonton Royals won by 8 wickets
CAA Centre, Brampton
Umpires: Arnold Maddela (Can) and Carl Tuckett (WI)
Player of the match: Anshuman Rath (Edmonton Royals)

- Edmonton Royals won the toss and elected to field.

4 August 2019
12:30
Scorecard

Brampton Wolves; 138 (19.5 overs)	v	Vancouver Knights; 139/2 (15.5 overs)
Babar Hayat 34 (32); Daniel Sams 4/25 (3.5 overs)		Chadwick Walton 53* (45); Cecil Pervez 1/11 (2 overs)

Vancouver Knights won by 8 wickets
CAA Centre, Brampton
Umpires: Harry Grewal (Can) and Bijal Patel (Can)
Player of the match: Daniel Sams (Vancouver Knights)

- Vancouver Knights won the toss and elected to field.

4 August 2019
16:30 (D/N)
Scorecard

Montreal Tigers; 136/9 (20 overs)	v	Toronto Nationals; 137/6 (17.3 overs)
Kyle Coetzer 26 (27); Salman Nazar 2/23 (4 overs)		Chirag Suri 52 (37); Alasdair Evans 2/21 (3 overs)

Toronto Nationals won by 4 wickets
CAA Centre, Brampton
Umpires: Arnold Maddela (Can) and Carl Tuckett (WI)
Player of the match: Chris Green (Toronto Nationals)

- Toronto Nationals won the toss and elected to field.

=== Round 2 ===
6 August 2019
12:30
Scorecard

Brampton Wolves	v	Edmonton Royals

Match abandoned
CAA Centre, Brampton

- No toss.
- No play was possible due to rain.

6 August 2019
16:30 (D/N)
Scorecard

Vancouver Knights	v	Winnipeg Hawks

Match abandoned
CAA Centre, Brampton

- No toss.
- No play was possible due to rain.

7 August 2019
12:30
Scorecard

Toronto Nationals; 189/5 (20 overs)	v	Montreal Tigers; 154 (19.3 overs)
Rodrigo Thomas 70 (56); Thisara Perera 2/24 (3 overs)		Matthew Cross 39 (26); Chris Green 3/26 (4 overs)

Toronto Nationals won by 35 runs
CAA Centre, Brampton
Umpires: Arnold Maddela (Can) and Verdayne Smith (WI)
Player of the match: Heinrich Klaasen (Toronto Nationals)

- Montreal Tigers won the toss and elected to field.
- The start of the match was delayed by three hours due to protests by players over wage payments. Bombay Sports publicly denied that this was the case, claiming that it was due to technical issues.

== Playoffs ==
Playoff 1 / Knockout
1	Brampton Wolves	103 (13.4 overs)
2	Vancouver Knights	170/4 (16 overs)
3	Toronto Nationals	238/5 (20 overs)
4	Winnipeg Hawks	201/5 (17.1 overs)

Playoff 3
1	Brampton Wolves	200/7 (20 overs)
4	Winnipeg Hawks	201/3 (20 overs)

Final
2	Vancouver Knights	192/6 (20 overs)
4	Winnipeg Hawks	192/8 (20 overs)

Playoff 1
8 August 2019
12:30
Scorecard

Vancouver Knights; 170/4 (16 overs)	v	Brampton Wolves; 103 (13.4 overs)
Shoaib Malik 46* (26); Shahid Afridi 1/17 (3 overs)		Colin Munro 62 (25); Saad Bin Zafar 4/22 (4 overs)

Vancouver Knights won by 77 runs (DLS method)
CAA Centre, Brampton
Umpires: Bijal Patel (Can) and Carl Tuckett (WI)
Player of the match: Saad Bin Zafar (Vancouver Knights)

- Brampton Wolves won the toss and elected to field.
- The match was reduced to 16 overs per side due to rain. Brampton Wolves were set a revised target of 181 runs from 16 overs.

Knockout
8 August 2019
16:30 (D/N)
Scorecard

Toronto Nationals; 238/5 (20 overs)	v	Winnipeg Hawks; 201/5 (17.1 overs)
Heinrich Klaasen 106* (49); Kaleem Sana 2/35 (4 overs)		JP Duminy 85* (41); Sandeep Lamichhane 2/34 (4 overs)

Winnipeg Hawks won by 2 runs (DLS method)
CAA Centre, Brampton
Umpires: Verdayne Smith (WI) and Vishal Sudhalkar (Can)
Player of the match: JP Duminy (Winnipeg Hawks)

- Winnipeg Hawks won the toss and elected to field.
- Rain stopped play during Winnipeg Hawk's innings setting the par score 200 runs from 17.1 overs.

Playoff 3
10 August 2019
14:00
Scorecard

Brampton Wolves; 200/7 (20 overs)	v	Winnipeg Hawks; 201/3 (20 overs)
Darren Sammy 33 (22); Rayad Emrit 3/43 (4 overs)		Shaiman Anwar 52 (23); Shahid Afridi 1/28 (3 overs)

Winnipeg Hawks won by 7 wickets
CAA Centre, Brampton
Umpires: Verdayne Smith (WI) and Vishal Sudhalkar (Can)
Player of the match: Shaiman Anwar (Winnipeg Hawks)

- Brampton Wolves won the toss and elected to bat.

=== Final ===
11 August 2019
14:00
Scorecard

Winnipeg Hawks; 192/8 (20 overs)	v	Vancouver Knights; 192/6 (20 overs)
Shaiman Anwar 90 (45); Andre Russell 4/29 (4 overs)		Shoaib Malik 64 (36); Rayad Emrit 2/37 (4 overs)

Match tied
(Winnipeg Hawks won the Super Over)
CAA Centre, Brampton
Umpires: Bijal Patel (Can) and Carl Tuckett (WI)
Player of the match: Shaiman Anwar (Winnipeg Hawks)

- Vancouver Knights won the toss and elected to field.

== Statistics ==
- Although matches are being played using standard Twenty20 formats, players' statistics aren't included in their official records because Cricket Canada is not a full-member of the International Cricket Council

=== Most runs ===
Player	Team	Innings	Runs	High score
JP Duminy	Winnipeg Hawks	8	332	85*
Heinrich Klaasen	Toronto Nationals	7	326	106*
Shaiman Anwar	Winnipeg Hawks	8	296	90
Chris Lynn	Winnipeg Hawks	7	295	89
Rodrigo Thomas	Toronto Nationals	7	291	73
Chris Gayle	Vancouver Knights	5	277	122*

- Source ESPNcricinfo

=== Most wickets ===
Player	Team	Matches	Wickets	Best bowling
Ish Sodhi	Brampton Wolves	6	12	5/8
Chris Green	Toronto Nationals	5	11	3/26
Shadab Khan	Edmonton Royals	5	9	3/23
Rayad Emrit	Winnipeg Hawks	7	9	3/40
Ben Cutting	Edmonton Royals	5	8	3/27
Saad Bin Zafar	Vancouver Knights	6	8	4/22
Jeremy Gordon	Toronto Nationals	7	8	2/36
