= Yodhin Punja =

Emirati cricketer (born 1999)

Personal information
- Born: 24 April 1999 (age 27)
- Bowling: Right arm Medium
- Role: Bowler

International information
- National side: United Arab Emirates
- Only ODI (cap 59): 16 November 2015 v Hong Kong
- Source: Cricinfo, 29 March 2020

Yodhin Punja (born 24 April 1999) is a cricketer who plays for the United Arab Emirates national cricket team. He made his first-class debut for the UAE against Hong Kong in the 2015–17 ICC Intercontinental Cup tournament on 11 November 2015. His One Day International (ODI) debut was also against Hong Kong in the 2015–17 ICC World Cricket League Championship on 16 November 2015. He became the youngest cricketer to play first-class and ODI cricket for the UAE.
