= Eerste Klasse (cricket) =

- Administrator: Koninklijke Nederlandse Cricket Bond
- Format: Limited overs cricket
- Tournament format: one eight-team division home and away in 1-day matches
- Number of teams: 8

The Eerste Klasse is the third highest domestic cricket competition in the Netherlands. Eight teams play in the regular competition. Although the direct translation from the Dutch name to English would be "First Class", it is not associated with what is recognised as first class cricket by the International Cricket Council.

== Competition Structure ==
There are 8 teams which play the first phase as a round robin home and away league. The second phase is played in two groups - the top four compete to be promoted to the Hoofdklasse, the second tier of domestic cricket competition, while the bottom four compete to avoid relegation to the Overgangsklasse, the fourth highest domestic competition.

== Previous years ==
From 2010 onwards, the KNCB renamed the leagues, the older 'Eerste Klasse' was changed to 'Hoofdklasse'. The Eerste Klasse champions for the recent years are shown below.

Year	Champion
2017	H.V. & C.V. QUICK 2
2016	V.C.C. 1
2015	Punjab Cricket Club 1
2014	V.V.V. 1
2013	Groen & Wit Amsterdam 1
2012	United C.C. 1
2011	Punjab C.C.R. 1
2010	Hercules 1
