= List of Nepalese Twenty20 cricketers =

This is a list of Nepalese Twenty20 cricketers. Twenty20 cricket matches are those between international teams or the highest standard of domestic teams. Matches played in the ICC World Twenty20 Qualifier also qualify as Twenty20. This list is not limited to those who have played Twenty20 cricket for Nepal and may include Nepalese players who played their Twenty20 cricket elsewhere. The players are listed alphabetically by their last name.

== Key ==
General

- ‡ – Captain
- † – Wicket-keeper
- Mat – Number of matches played

Batting

- Inn – Number of innings batted
- Runs – Runs scored in career
- HS – Highest score
- * – Batsman remained not out
- Avg – Runs scored per dismissal

Bowling

- Balls – Balls bowled in career
- Wkt – Wickets taken in career
- BBI – Best bowling in an innings
- Ave – Average runs per wicket

Fielding

- Ca – Catches taken
- St – Stumpings made

== Players ==
Statistics are correct as of Nepal's most recent Twenty20 match, against Jersey on 18 July 2015.

Players are categorized in the order of number of matches played.

Name	Career Span	Mat	Batting				Bowling				Fielding		Team(s)	Ref(s)
Name	Career Span	Mat	Runs	HS	Avg	100	Wkt	BBI	Ave	5	Ca	St	Team(s)	Ref(s)
Gyanendra Malla †	2012–2022	68	1267	107	22.62	1	0	–	–	-	31	5	Nepal	
Paras Khadka ‡	2012–2020	56	1317	106*	30.62	1	28	3/22	26.89	-	26	-	Nepal	
Sompal Kami	2014–2022	49	227	40	13.35	-	44	3/20	24.18	-	17	-	Nepal	
Binod Bhandari †	2013–2021	48	478	58*	15.93	-	0	–	–	-	14	8	Nepal	
Karan KC	2015–2022	48	293	45	15.42	-	62	5/21	19.20	1	15	-	Nepal	
Dipendra Singh Airee	2018-2022	47	1131	110*	35.34	1	21	4/18	19,61	-	22	-	Nepal	
Sandeep Lamichhane	2018-2022	47	53	16*	5.88	-	88	5/9	13.00	1	18	-	Nepal	
Sharad Vesawkar	2012–2022	43	615	44	24.60	-	0-	–-	–-	-	14	-	Nepal	
Basanta Regmi	2012–2019	40	103	20*	7.92	-	53	4/16	17.00	-	12	-	Nepal	
Abinash Bohara	2019-2022	39	21	12	5.25	-	40	4/35	21.42	-	7	-	Nepal	
Pradeep Airee	2012–2015	27	260	65*	13.00		0	–	–		4	0	Nepal	
Mehboob Alam	2012–2012	7	34	13	5.66		1	1/20	47.00		1	0	Nepal	
Prithu Baskota	2012–2012	9	83	36*	20.75		2	2/4	2.00		4	0	Nepal	
Amrit Bhattarai	2012–2014	7	2	2	2.00		3	2/27	40.66		0	0	Nepal	
Naresh Budhayer	2014–2014	4	7	5	3.50		0	–	–		0	0	Nepal	
Shakti Gauchan	2012–2015	30	31	10	6.20		31	4/20	19.32		6	0	Nepal	
Avinash Karn	2013–2015	7	4	4	4.00		7	2/14	19.42		1	0	Nepal	
Subash Khakurel †	2013–2015	18	346	56	19.22		0	–	–		4	8	Nepal	
Paresh Lohani	2012–2012	4	24	12	6.00		0	–	–		0	0	Nepal	
Siddhant Lohani	2015–2015	1	27	27	27.00		0	–	–		0	0	Nepal	
Anil Mandal	2012–2015	13	185	50	18.50		0	–	–		4	0	Nepal	
Jitendra Mukhiya	2013–2015	15	6	6*	–		15	3/18	20.20		1	0	Nepal	
Rajesh Pulami	2014–2015	7	56	25	8.00		0	–	–		0	0	Nepal	
Sagar Pun	2013–2015	21	209	22	11.61		11	3/12	25.27		6	0	Nepal	
Sanjam Regmi	2012–2012	9	5	5*	–		4	2/18	49.00		0	0	Nepal	
Chandra Sawad	2012–2012	9	2	1	1.00		11	4/24	19.18		2	0	Nepal	

== See also ==
- Nepal national cricket team
- Twenty20
- List of Nepal Twenty20 International cricketers
- List of Nepalese First-class cricketers
- List of Nepalese List A cricketers
