= Babar Hayat =

Pakistani-born Hong Kong cricketer

Personal information
- Full name: Babar Hayat
- Born: 5 January 1992 (age 34); Hazro, Punjab, Pakistan
- Batting: Right-handed
- Bowling: Right-arm medium
- Role: Batsman

International information
- National side: Hong Kong (2014–present)
- ODI debut (cap 22): 1 May 2014 v Afghanistan
- Last ODI: 18 September 2018 v India
- ODI shirt no.: 10
- T20I debut (cap 3): 16 March 2014 v Nepal
- Last T20I: 13 November 2025 v Qatar
- T20I shirt no.: 10

Domestic team information
- Years: Team
- 2024: Karnali Yaks

Career statistics
| Competition | ODI | T20I | FC | LA |
|---|---|---|---|---|
| Matches | 22 | 95 | 6 | 62 |
| Runs scored | 784 | 2,216 | 712 | 1,970 |
| Batting average | 39.20 | 28.41 | 71.20 | 37.16 |
| 100s/50s | 0/8 | 2/12 | 3/1 | 2/14 |
| Top score | 89 | 122 | 214* | 135 |
| Catches/stumpings | 11/– | 52/– | 7/– | 22/– |
- Source: ESPNcricinfo, 31 July 2025

Babar Hayat (born 5 January 1992) is a Pakistani-born Hong Kong cricketer, who plays for the Hong Kong cricket team. He is a right-handed batsman and a former captain of the national team.

== International career ==
Babar made his T20I cricket debut against Nepal on 16 March 2014. In his debut match he made only 20 runs from 25 balls. He made his One Day International debut against Afghanistan in the 2014 ACC Premier League on 1 May 2014. In the 2016 Asia Cup Qualifier in February 2016, he became the first Hong Kong player to score a century (122 runs off 60 balls) in a T20I match.

Babar Hayat set the record for the highest ever T20I score by any player in the second innings of a T20I (122) and second in the list for scoring the highest ever T20I score in a losing cause just behind Australia's Shane Watson's 124*. Babar Hayat's 122 was also the highest ever score in T20I in the 2nd innings of a T20I in a losing cause. Babar Hayat's 122 was in second place for the highest percentage of runs in a completed innings of a team, where his team scored only 175/7 in that innings.

On 16 February 2017 in the 2015–17 ICC World Cricket League Championship match against the Netherlands, he and Anshuman Rath made 197 runs for the third wicket. This was a List A record for Hong Kong and a record for any wicket in a World Cricket League match.

In December 2017, he became the first batsman for Hong Kong to score a double century in first-class cricket, when he made 214 not out against Papua New Guinea in the 2015–17 ICC Intercontinental Cup.

In August 2018, he was named the captain of Hong Kong's squad for the 2018 Asia Cup Qualifier tournament. However, prior to the tournament, Hayat stepped down as captain, with Anshuman Rath replacing him. Hong Kong won the qualifier tournament, and he was then named in Hong Kong's squad for the 2018 Asia Cup.

In December 2018, he was named in Hong Kong's team for the 2018 ACC Emerging Teams Asia Cup. He was the leading run-scorer for Hong Kong in the tournament, with 136 runs in three matches. In April 2019, he was named in Hong Kong's squad for the 2019 ICC World Cricket League Division Two tournament in Namibia.

In September 2019, he was named in Hong Kong's squad for the 2019 ICC T20 World Cup Qualifier tournament in the United Arab Emirates. However, ahead of the 2019–20 Oman Pentangular Series, Hayat declared that he was no longer available to play for Hong Kong.

However, in May 2022, he was named in Hong Kong's side for the 2022 Uganda Cricket World Cup Challenge League B tournament.

== T20 franchise career ==
On 3 June 2019, he was selected to play for the Vancouver Knights in the players' draft for the inaugural edition of the Global T20 Canada tournament. In June 2019, he was selected to play for the Brampton Wolves franchise team in the 2019 Global T20 Canada tournament.
