= Royal Dutch Cricket Association =

Governing body of cricket in the Netherlands

- Sport: Cricket
- Jurisdiction: Netherlands
- Abbreviation: KNCB
- Founded: 1890; 136 years ago
- Affiliation: International Cricket Council
- Affiliation date: 1966; 60 years ago
- Regional affiliation: ICC Europe
- Affiliation date: 1997; 29 years ago
- Headquarters: Amstelveen, Netherlands
- Location: Amstelveen
- Chairman: Guido Landheer
- CEO: Huib van Walsem
- Secretary: Willemijn Vorderman-Jansen
- Sponsor: Globe, Da Vinci. Tachyon, Gray-Nicolls, Fairtree

Official website
- www.kncb.nl
- (Netherlands)

The Royal Dutch Cricket Association (Dutch: Koninklijke Nederlandse Cricket Bond; KNCB) is the governing body of cricket in the Kingdom of the Netherlands. It was formed in 1890 and received a Royal charter in 1958. The KNCB is responsible for the national men's and women's teams, and also for the various domestic competitions, including the Topklasse (Division One) and Hoofdklasse (Division Two) leagues, and the Dutch Twenty20 Cup. The KNCB has been an associate member of the International Cricket Council since 1966. It is one of the oldest national governing bodies in the sport, older than those of many full ICC members. The KNCB is also a member of the ICC Europe (succeeding the European Cricket Council), which organises the European Cricket Championship.

== Overview ==
Koninklijke Nederlandse Cricket Bond is an administrative organization responsible for the promotion, development, and organization of the sport of cricket in the Netherlands. It controls the men's national team, and the women's national team teams. The women's national team currently have Test status and played their first Test match in 2007. A total of 57 cricket clubs take part in the domestic season, which includes the 50-over Hoofdklasse, Topklasse and the T20 league.

== History ==
Cricket was first seen being played on Dutch soil in the 1780s by an English traveller in Scheveningen, and by the turn of the 20th century, Dutch teams were touring England regularly. Cricket was one of the most popular sports in the Netherlands in the 19th century, surpassed since by many other sports, most notably association football. Cricket even found enough of a following to survive the German occupation of the country between May 1940 and May 1945. The sport, famously dismissed as "unmanly and un-German" and "insufficiently violent" by Adolf Hitler himself, endured thanks in no small part to the dogged enthusiasm of local players, who shrugged off the requisitioning of grounds and restrictions on weekend travel – not to mention the presence of thousands of heavily armed Nazis and the bombing of the main sports dealers in Rotterdam – to organise as many as 300 matches a year.

The KNCB has been an associate member of the International Cricket Council since 1966. There are a few cricket grounds in the Netherlands which are officially sanctioned by the ICC to host ODIs such as Amstelveen, Rotterdam and Voorburg. It hosted one of the matches of the 1999 Cricket World Cup, though the Dutch did not participate in that tournament.

The Dutch participated in the 1996 Cricket World Cup, 2003 Cricket World Cup, 2007 Cricket World Cup, and 2011 Cricket World Cup. In their debut campaign, they lost all of their matches barring a respectful performance against England. They qualified for the 2003 edition after winning the 2001 ICC Trophy, with their only win of the World Cup tournament coming against fellow qualifier Namibia. It was around this time that stars and excellent cricketers like Ronald Lefebvre and Ryan ten Doeschate started emerging to make Dutch cricket much more strong.

=== Present day ===
The Dutch qualified for the 2007 World Cup with a fifth-place finish at the 2005 ICC Trophy. The Dutch struggled in the tournament, losing their first two games, with South African Herschelle Gibbs notably hitting Daan van Bunge for six sixes in an over. They did recover to beat Scotland by eight wickets in their last game. After failing to qualify for the 2007 ICC World Twenty20, they qualified for the 2009 ICC World Twenty20, where they shocked host England at Lord's.

After years of stagnation, the women's game is also developing rapidly in the Netherlands. Recently, the women's team outshone the men's team and they were given Test cricket status by the ICC in 2007 unlike their male counterparts. They played their inaugural Test match against South Africa Women in 2007.

The Dutch men's team qualified for the 2011 Cricket World Cup by coming third in the 2009 ICC World Cup Qualifier. Although they lost all of their matches, the Dutch gave England a fright in Nagpur, where Ryan ten Doeschate smashed 119 runs. The result was 292 - 296/4.

2010 turned out to be a memorable year for Dutch cricket as they defeated two Test-playing nations, Bangladesh and Zimbabwe.

The Netherlands cricket team participated in the Intercontinental Cup and Intercontinental Cup One-Day while the women's team won the 2011 Women's European Championship Twenty20. More recently, they participated in the 2011 Women's Cricket World Cup Qualifier where they came third in Group A, thus gaining both ODI Status and World Cup participation.

== Teams ==
- Netherlands national cricket team
- Netherlands women's national cricket team
- Netherlands national under-19 cricket team
- Netherlands women's national under-19 cricket team

== Name change ==
Before 1958 the KNCB was known as the Nederlandse Cricket Bond or the Dutch Cricket Board. After receiving a Royal charter in 1958, a ’Royal’ was added before the board's name known simply as Koninklijke in Dutch. The following names have been for the board in their history:-

- Nederlandse Cricket Bond (Dutch Cricket Board)
- Koninklijke Nederlandse Cricket Bond (Royal Dutch Cricket Board)

== Competitions ==
As well as maintaining Dutch international sides, the KNCB is also responsible for managing the regional domestic competitions. The following domestic competitions are organized in the Netherlands:-

- Topklasse
- Hoofdklasse
- Eerste Klasse
- Topklasse Twenty20 Cup

In addition, a number of youth programs as well as women's programs are organized in the Netherlands.

== Sponsorship ==
In recent years NORDEK and Fairtree have been substantial supporters of Dutch cricket in general and the men's team in particular. SISAR B.V. became the first official sponsor of the Dutch women's cricket team in December 2022. SISAR B.V. signed a sponsorship contract for three years with the KNCB.

In earlier years, sponsors included Amul as the official sponsor of the Dutch cricket team during the 2011 Cricket World Cup. and leading Dutch bank ABN AMRO.

== See also ==
- Cricket in the Netherlands
- Netherlands national cricket team
- Netherlands women's national cricket team
- North Sea Pro Series
- Scheids Rechters Commissie, cricket umpires association in the Netherlands
