= Tabarak Dar =

Pakistani-born Hong Kong cricketer

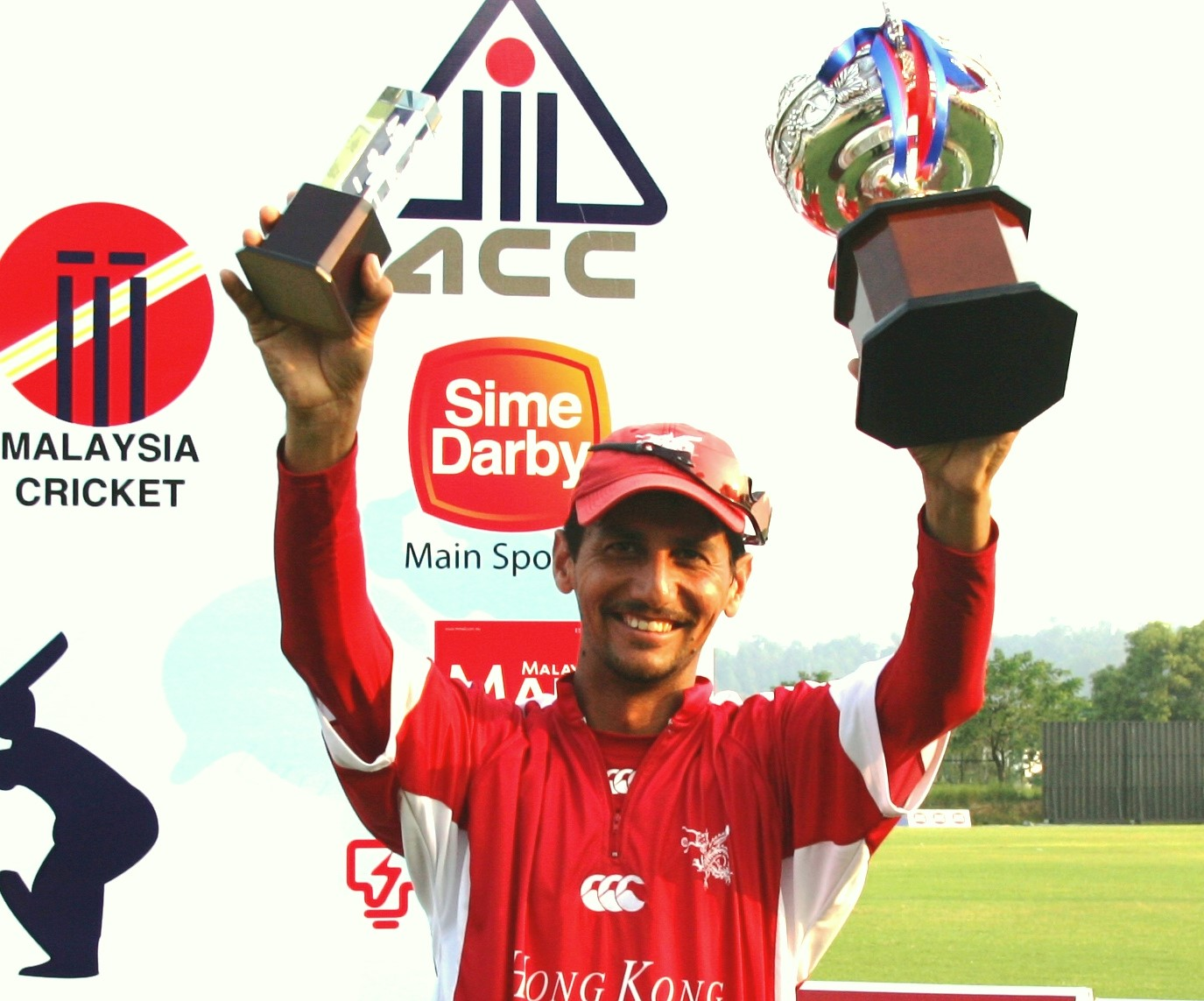
- Dar Holding the ACC Trophy in 2008

Personal information
- Born: 3 May 1976 (age 50); Mirpur, Azad Kashmir, Pakistan
- Nickname: Tabarak Dar
- Batting: Right-handed
- Bowling: Right-arm medium
- Role: Batsman

International information
- National side: Hong Kong
- ODI debut (cap 11): 16 July 2004 v Bangladesh
- Last ODI: 25 June 2008 v India

Domestic team information
- Years: Team
- 1995–2015: Little Sai Wan Cricket Club

Umpiring information
- ODIs umpired: 3 (2016–2017)
- T20Is umpired: 53 (2016–2026)
- WODIs umpired: 2 (2023)
- WT20Is umpired: 31 (2019–2025)

Career statistics
Competition	ODI	FC	LA
Matches	4	2	4
Runs scored	101	14	101
Batting average	25.25	4.66	25.25
100s/50s	0/0	0/0	0/0
Top score	36	6	36
Catches/stumpings	0/–	0/–	0/–
- Source: CricketArchive, 24 August 2022

Tabarak Hussain Dar (Urdu: تبارک ڈار; Born 3 May 1976) is a Pakistani-born former international cricketer who played for Hong Kong and is now an umpire.

Dar played as a specialist batsman, though his medium-pace bowling yielded seven wickets at the 2001 ICC Trophy, which was his international debut event. Dar played two first-class matches and four One Day International (ODIs) for Hong Kong.

== Playing career ==
Dar took four for 34 from six overs in his first official match for Hong Kong, a 49-run loss to the United States in the third match of the 2001 ICC Trophy. He also made 19 with the bat, but scored at a rate of 3.8 an over, well below the required rate to chase the target of 245.

The next two matches saw him promoted in the bowling order, first to second change against Papua New Guinea where he took two wickets but did not bat in a 106-run win, and he opened the bowling against Bermuda, taking one wicket for 30 runs. Batting at six, however, he could only make three against Bermuda, as Hong Kong fell to 102 all out and lost by 104 runs.

Dar remained in the team for the 2004 Asia Cup, and top scored in both matches, making 20 against Bangladesh and 36 off 43 balls against Pakistan. His ODI batting average of 28 is thus the highest by any Hong Kong cricketer. However, he could not prevent Hong Kong being knocked out at the group stage, after losses by 116 and 173 runs respectively.

Dar also played in the 2005 ICC Intercontinental Cup, but was dismissed in single figures in all three innings, as Hong Kong finished on the bottom of the Asian group. Hong Kong finished fifth at the Asian Cricket Council Fast Track Tournament.

Dar was named Hong Kong team captain in 2006 and played in various ACC and ICC matches till 2009. Dar led the Hong Kong team to their first ever ACC trophy championship in 2008 in Malaysia. Hong Kong beat Afghanistan in the semi-final and UAE in the final. Later that year, Dar led the Hong Kong team in the 2008 Asia Cup held in Karachi. Hong Kong played their first match against Pakistan and second against India. Dar was the highest scorer for Hong Kong in both matches.

== Umpiring career ==
Dar made his international umpiring debut in a Twenty20 International between Hong Kong and Scotland in January 2016. He stood in his first One Day International match between Hong Kong and Papua New Guinea on 4 November 2016. In April 2019, he was named as one of the eight on-field umpires for the 2019 ICC World Cricket League Division Two tournament in Namibia.

== See also ==
- List of One Day International cricket umpires
- List of Twenty20 International cricket umpires
