= List of Nepalese first-class cricketers =

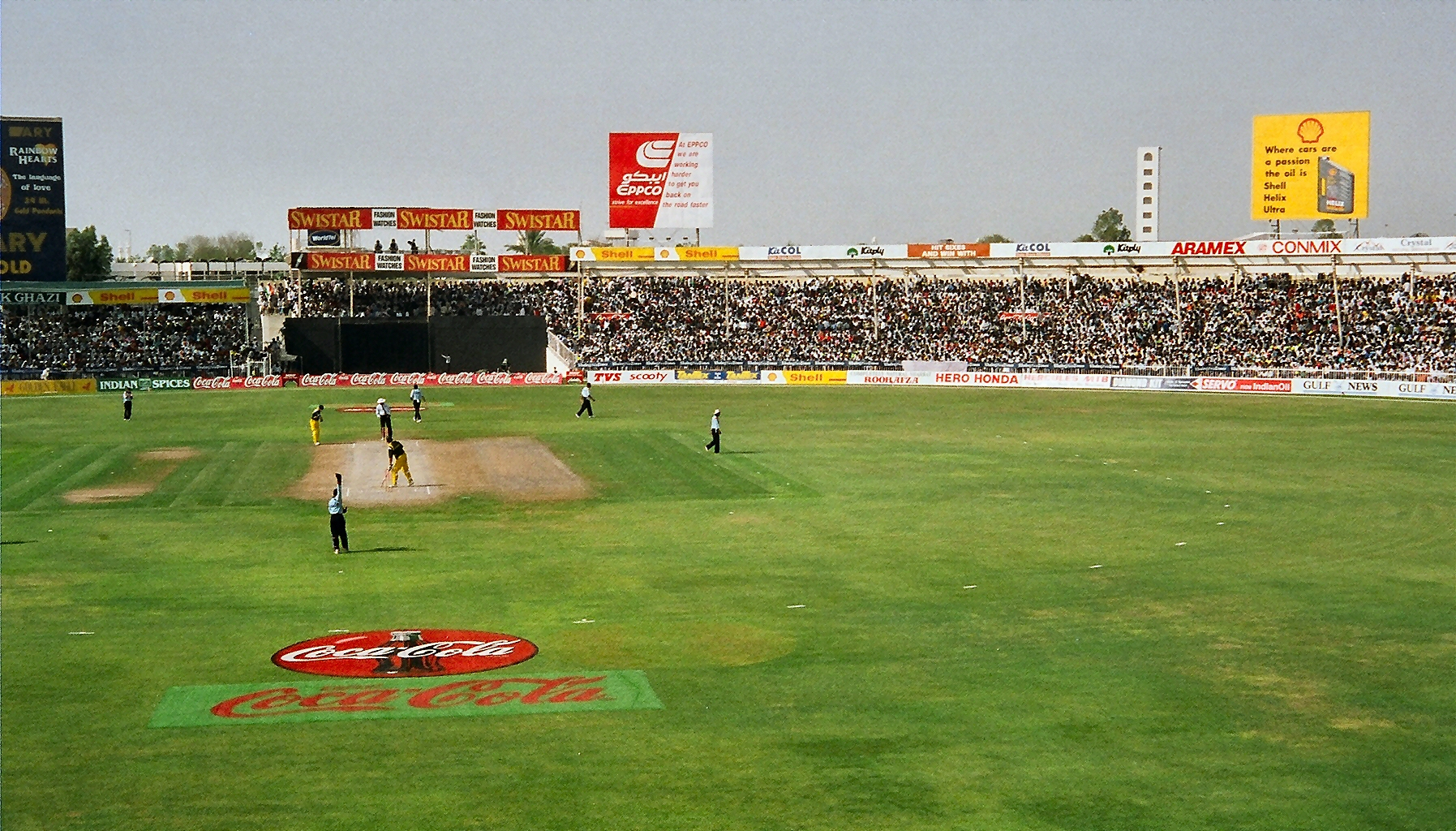
Nepal played their first First-class match against UAE at the Sharjah Cricket Association Stadium in the 2004 ICC Intercontinental Cup.

This is a list of Nepalese first-class cricketers. First-class cricket matches are those between international teams or the highest standard of domestic teams in which teams have two innings each. Generally, matches are eleven players a side but there have been exceptions.

Today all matches must be scheduled to have at least three days' duration; historically, matches were played to a finish with no pre-defined time span.

This list is not limited to those who have played first-class cricket for Nepal and may include Nepalese players who played their first-class cricket elsewhere. The players are listed alphabetically by their last name.

== Key ==
General

- ‡ – Captain
- † – Wicket-keeper
- Mat – Number of matches played

Batting

- Inn – Number of innings batted
- Runs – Runs scored in career
- HS – Highest score
- * – Batsman remained not out
- Avg – Runs scored per dismissal

Bowling

- Balls – Balls bowled in career
- Wkt – Wickets taken in career
- BBI – Best bowling in an innings
- BBM – Best bowling in a match
- Ave – Average runs per wicket

Fielding

- Ca – Catches taken
- St – Stumpings made

== Players ==
Statistics are correct as of Nepal's most recent First-class match, against Marylebone Cricket Club on 6 November 2019.

Name	Career Span	Mat	Batting				Bowling					Fielding		Team(s)	Ref(s)
Name	Career Span	Mat	Inn	Runs	HS	Avg	Balls	Wkt	BBI	BBM	Ave	Ca	St	Team(s)	Ref(s)
Mehboob Alam	2004–2005	4	7	98	34	14.00	414	12	3/25	6/57	14.83	1	0	Nepal	
Manoj Baishya †	2005–2005	2	2	4	4	4.00	0	0	–	–	–	5	0	Nepal	
Raju Basnyat	2004–2005	4	4	40	23	20.00	258	5	3/27	3/27	22.00	0	0	Nepal	
Dhirendra Chand	2005–2005	2	–	–	–	–	201	7	2/12	4/39	13.00	1	0	Nepal	
Dipendra Chaudhary	2004–2005	2	4	20	9	5.00	0	0	–	–	–	2	0	Nepal	
Kanishka Chaugai	2005–2005	2	3	101	48	33.66	0	0	–	–	–	3	0	Nepal	
Bikash Dali	2004–2004	1	2	7	5	7.00	0	0	–	–	–	0	0	Nepal	
Binod Das ‡	2004–2005	3	4	56	17	28.00	566	19	6/29	7/37	11.42	1	0	Nepal	
Shakti Gauchan	2004–2005	4	6	171	69*	34.20	252	5	2/18	4/37	21.40	5	0	Nepal	
Manoj Katuwal †	2004–2004	2	3	40	24	20.00	0	0	–	–	–	3	0	Nepal	
Paras Khadka	2004–2005	2	2	72	44	36.00	60	1	1/19	1/19	21.00	4	0	Nepal	
Raju Khadka ‡	2004–2004	2	3	75	67	25.00	56	3	2/17	2/34	18.66	1	0	Nepal	
Paresh Lohani	2004–2005	4	7	133	49	22.16	0	0	–	–	–	3	0	Nepal	
Raj Pradhan	2004–2005	4	2	5	4	2.50	314	5	2/23	3/35	33.40	1	0	Nepal	
Sanjam Regmi	2004–2004	2	2	13	8*	13.00	432	7	3/25	5/61	24.71	0	0	Nepal	
Sharad Vesawkar	2004–2019	5	8	189	89	27.00	84	2	2/35	2/35	20.00	3	0	Nepal	
Sompal Kami	2015–2019	3	3	77	51	25.66	336	6	2/8	3/102	41.50	2	0	Saracens Nepal	
Aarif Sheikh	2019–2019	1	2	29	19	14.50	0	0	–	–	–	0	0	Nepal	
Dipendra Singh Airee	2019–2019	1	2	1	1	0.50	6	0	–	–	–	0	0	Nepal	
Binod Bhandari	2019–2019	1	2	36	36	18.00	0	0	–	–	–	0	0	Nepal	
Karan KC	2019–2019	1	2	20	18	10.00	186	6	3/45	6/112	18.66	1	0	Nepal	
Sandeep Lamichhane	2019–2019	1	2	64	39*	64.00	216	3	3/84	3/134	44.66	0	0	Nepal	
Gyanendra Malla‡	2019–2019	1	2	6	6	3.00	0	0	–	–	–	1	0	Nepal	
Lalit Rajbanshi	2019–2019	1	2	0	0*	0.00	96	1	1/6	1/66	66.00	1	0	Nepal	
Raju Rijal†	2019–2019	1	2	39	31	19.50	0	0	–	–	–	2	0	Nepal	
Pawan Sarraf	2019–2019	1	2	2	2	1.00	54	1	1/28	1/64	64.00	0	0	Nepal	

== See also ==
- Nepal national cricket team
- First-class cricket
- List of Nepal Twenty20 International cricketers
- List of Nepalese List A cricketers
- List of Nepalese Twenty20 cricketers
