= Ishtiaq Muhammad =

Hong Kong cricketer (born 1992)

Personal information
- Born: 31 December 1992 (age 33); Hong Kong
- Batting: Right-handed
- Bowling: Right-arm off-break

International information
- National side: Hong Kong
- ODI debut: 26 November 2016 v Scotland
- Source: ESPNcricinfo

Ishtiaq Muhammad (born 31 December 1992) is a Hong Kong cricketer. He made his One Day International debut in Hong Kong's victory on 26 January 2016 against Scotland in the 2015–17 ICC World Cricket League Championship, in Hong Kong's home ODI debut.
