= World Cricket League Championship =

WCL Championship
- Administrator: ICC
- Format: One Day International & List A
- First edition: 2007
- Latest edition: 2015-17
- Number of teams: Six (2007 and 2010); Eight (since 2011)
- Current champion: Netherlands (1st title)
- Most successful: Ireland (2 titles)
- Most runs: (Scotland) Kyle Coetzer(ODI:663 & List-A:1169)
- Most wickets: ODI: (Scotland) Alasdair Evans(15) List-A: (Netherlands) Mudassar Bukhari(32)

The ICC World Cricket League Championship was the top division of the World Cricket League (WCL). It formed the qualification process for the Cricket World Cup.

The WCL Championship was originally known as World Cricket League Division One, and was played twice under that name (in 2007 and 2010). Those were hosted as standalone tournaments, but a new format was subsequently introduced in which competing teams play multiple games against each other over several years (mirroring the Intercontinental Cup, a first-class competition). All matches in the WCL Championship hold List A status, while matches between higher-ranking teams hold One Day International (ODI) status.

== History ==
The first WCL Division One tournament in 2007 featured the top six teams from the 2005 ICC Trophy, while the 2010 tournament featured the top six teams from the 2009 World Cup Qualifier. Two teams from WCL Division Two were added for the 2011–13 WCL Championship, making eight teams in total. The top two teams from the 2011–13 competition (Ireland and Afghanistan) gained automatic qualification for the 2015 World Cup. They were subsequently promoted to the ICC ODI Championship, although the 2015–17 WCL Championship remained an eight-team competition as two additional teams were promoted from Division Two.

== Results ==
| Edition | Host | Final | | | |
| Edition | Host | Venue | Winner | Result | Runner-up |
|---|---|---|---|---|---|
| 2007 | Kenya | Nairobi | Kenya; 158/2 (37.5 overs) | Kenya won by 8 wickets scorecard | Scotland; 155 (47 overs) |
| 2010 | Netherlands | Amsterdam | Ireland; 233/4 (44.5 overs) | Ireland won by 6 wickets scorecard | Scotland; 232 (48.5 overs) |
| 2011–13 | no single host | no final | Ireland; 24 points | Ireland won on points points table | Afghanistan; 19 points |
| 2015–17 | no single host | no final | Netherlands; 22 points | Netherlands won on points points table | Scotland; 19 points |

== Performance by team ==
Legend

- 1st – Champions
- 2nd – Runners-up
- 3rd – Third place
- Q – Qualified

| Team | 2007 | 2010 | 2011 –13 | 2015 –17 | Total |
|---|---|---|---|---|---|
| Afghanistan | — | 3rd | 2nd | ODI | 2 |
| Bermuda | 6th | — | — | — | 1 |
| Canada | 4th | 5th | 8th | — | 3 |
| Hong Kong | — | — | — | 3rd | 1 |
| Ireland | 5th | 1st | 1st | ODI | 3 |
| Kenya | 1st | 6th | 6th | 5th | 4 |
| Namibia | — | — | 7th | 8th | 2 |
| Nepal | — | — | — | 7th | 1 |
| Netherlands | 3rd | 4th | 4th | 1st | 4 |
| Papua New Guinea | — | — | — | 4th | 1 |
| Scotland | 2nd | 2nd | 5th | 2nd | 4 |
| United Arab Emirates | — | — | 3rd | 6th | 2 |

== Player statistics ==
| Edition | Most runs | Most wickets | MVP | Ref |
|---|---|---|---|---|
| 2007 | (Canada) Ashish Bagai (345) | (Kenya) Peter Ongondo (15) | (Canada) Ashish Bagai | |
| 2010 | (Netherlands) Tom Cooper (408) | (Ireland) Alex Cusack (10) | (Netherlands) Tom Cooper | |
| 2011–13 | (United Arab Emirates) Shaiman Anwar (625) | (Namibia) Christi Viljoen (23) | | |
| 2015–17 | (Hong Kong) Anshuman Rath (678) | (Hong Kong) Nadeem Ahmed (24) | | |

== See also ==
- ICC Six Nations Challenge, a similar tournament predating the World Cricket League
