= Anshuman Rath =

Hong Kong-born Indian cricketer

Personal information
- Full name: Anshuman Rath
- Born: 5 November 1997 (age 29); Bhubaneshwar, Orissa, India
- Batting: Left-handed
- Bowling: Slow left-arm orthodox
- Role: Batsman, occasional wicket-keeper

International information
- National side: Hong Kong (2014-present)
- ODI debut (cap 29): 8 November 2014 v PNG
- Last ODI: 18 September 2018 v India
- T20I debut (cap 17): 15 July 2015 v Nepal
- Last T20I: 13 November 2025 v Qatar

Domestic team information
- Years: Team
- 2021/22–present: Odisha

Career statistics
Competition	ODI	T20I	FC	LA
Matches	18	68	7	44
Runs scored	736	1,824	454	1,914
Batting average	52.57	30.40	45.40	47.85
100s/50s	1/6	1/9	0/4	3/15
Top score	143*	100*	98*	143*
Balls bowled	337	250	164	451
Wickets	14	7	7	16
Bowling average	11.92	47.71	16.14	17.87
5 wickets in innings	0	0	0	0
10 wickets in match	0	0	0	0
Best bowling	3/22	3/6	4/34	3/22
Catches/stumpings	4/–	23/–	3/–	10/–
- Source: ESPNcricinfo, 31 July 2025

Anshuman Rath (born 5 November 1997) is an Indian-born Hong Kong cricketer who previously captained the Hong Kong national cricket team. In September 2019, he retired from the Hong Kong national team to pursue a career in India. In August 2021, he became eligible to play as a local player in India as an Indian passport holder, and represented Odisha from the 2021–22 Indian domestic cricket season.

Rath returned to Hong Kong's squad for the Hong Kong Quadrangular Series in March 2023.

== Personal life ==
Anshuman Rath's home is based in Satyanagar, Bhubaneswar, Odisha, India and he belongs to an Odia family. In the late 1990s, his father left India for business and settled in Hong Kong. Anshuman was born in 1997 in Hong Kong.

He started playing cricket at the age of four with Tarang, when his father introduced him to the sport. He attended West Island School.

== International career ==
He made his One Day International (ODI) debut for Hong Kong on 8 November 2014 against Papua New Guinea in Australia. He made his Twenty20 International debut for Hong Kong against Nepal at the 2015 ICC World Twenty20 Qualifier tournament on 15 July 2015. He made his first-class debut for Hong Kong against the United Arab Emirates in the 2015–17 ICC Intercontinental Cup tournament on 11 November 2015.

On 16 February 2017 in the 2015–17 ICC World Cricket League Championship match against the Netherlands, he scored his maiden List A century and added 197 runs for the third wicket with Babar Hayat. This was a List A record for Hong Kong and a record for any wicket in a World Cricket League match.

In December 2017, he scored his first century in an ODI match (143 not out), against Papua New Guinea in the 2015–17 ICC World Cricket League Championship. It was also the highest individual score by a Hong Kong batsman in an ODI. He finished as the leading run-scorer in the 2015–17 ICC World Cricket League Championship, with a total of 678 runs from 10 matches.

In August 2018, he was named the vice-captain of Hong Kong's squad for the 2018 Asia Cup Qualifier tournament. However, prior to the tournament, he replaced Babar Hayat as captain, after Hayat stepped down from the role, saying that wanted "to focus on my cricket and my performance going forward”. Hong Kong won the qualifier tournament, and he was then named as captain of Hong Kong's squad for the 2018 Asia Cup.

In April 2019, he was named as the captain of Hong Kong's squad for the 2019 ICC World Cricket League Division Two tournament in Namibia. He was the leading run-scorer in the tournament, with 290 runs in six matches. He and Nizakat Khan scored 174 against India, the highest partnership for Hong Kong in ODIs. Hong Kong lost the match by 26 runs but the fight was praised by the Indian team.

== T20 franchise career ==
In June 2019, he was selected to play for the Edmonton Royals franchise team in the 2019 Global T20 Canada tournament.
