= Hoofdklasse (cricket) =

Cricket competition

- Administrator: Koninklijke Nederlandse Cricket Bond
- Format: Limited overs cricket
- Tournament format: one eight-team division home and away in 1-day matches
- Number of teams: 8
- 2015 Hoofdklasse

The Hoofdklasse is the second highest domestic cricket competition in the Netherlands. Eight teams play in the regular competition.

== Teams ==
| Team | Place | Overseas player |
|---|---|---|
| Bloemendaal CC 1 | Bloemendaal | |
| Groen & Wit 1 | Amsterdam | |
| HCC 1 | The Hague | Werner Coetsee and Jonathan Vandiar |
| Kampong CC 1 | Utrecht | |
| Rood & Wit 1 | Haarlem | |
| Sparta Rotterdam 1 | Rotterdam | Muhammed Wasim |
| VCC 1 | The Hague | |
| VVV 1 | Amsterdam | |

== Previous years ==
This overview starts in 2010, when the poules were rescheduled and renamed. From this season onwards the 'Eerste Klasse' was changed to 'Hoofdklasse'.

| Year | Champion | Most runs | Amount (runs) | Most wickets | Amount (wickets) |
|---|---|---|---|---|---|
| 2015 | H.C.C. 1 | J. Vandiar (H.C.C.) | 840 | R. Bijloos (H.C.C.), M. Snoep (Sparta) | 33 |
| 2014 | H.B.S 1 | A. Hewitt (Kampong) | 635 | P. Reardon (Bloemendaal) | 40 |
| 2013 | V.O.C 1 | G.R. Hay (Rood & Wit) | 766 | M. Singh (V.O.C.) | 38 |
| 2012 | H.B.S 1 | P. Fulton (Rood & Wit) | 797 | G.D. Elliott (HBS Craeyenhout) | 32 |
| 2011 | Dosti CC 1 | M. Wasim (Dosti CC) | 717 | S. Zalpuri (Kampong) | 27 |
| 2010 | Dosti CC 1 | M. Wasim (Dosti CC) | 727 | A.P. Devcich (H.B.S.) | 30 |
