= International cricket in 2016–17 =

International cricket season

The 2016–2017 international cricket season was from September 2016 to April 2017. During this period, 41 Test matches, 87 One Day Internationals (ODIs), 43 Twenty20 Internationals (T20Is), 4 first class matches, 16 List A matches, 41 Women's One Day Internationals (WODIs), and 15 Women's Twenty20 Internationals (WT20Is) were played. Of the 41 Test matches that took place in this season, 3 were day/night Test matches. The season started with Pakistan leading the Test cricket rankings, Australia leading the ODI rankings, New Zealand leading the Twenty20 rankings, and Australia women leading the Women's rankings.

Men's full member cricket started with New Zealand's tour to India. India's 3–0 win over New Zealand in the Test series saw India move up to first in the Test rankings. This tour also saw several milestones in Indian cricket with the first Test of the series being India's 500th Test match, the second Test of the series being India's 250th Test at home, and the first ODI being India's 900th ODI. Notable highlights in this season include Bangladesh's first ever Test victory over England in a two-match series tied 1–1, and South Africa's third consecutive Test series victory against Australia in Australia. However, South Africa's tour to Australia suffered from controversy as the International Cricket Council (ICC) charged Faf du Plessis, South Africa's captain with ball tampering. New Zealand managed to win its first Test series against Pakistan since 1985. India won the Test series against England, contested for the Anthony de Mello Trophy, for the first time since 2008. The tenth edition of the Chappell–Hadlee Trophy, which was held in Australia, was won by Australia 3–0, and the eleventh edition, which was held in New Zealand, was won by New Zealand 2–0. Bangladesh played its first ever Test match in India, which India won by 208 runs. There was one international tournament, a tri-series in Zimbabwe which also contained Sri Lanka and the West Indies, which was won by Sri Lanka. The season also witnessed Sri Lanka's first ever series win in any format against South Africa in South Africa when they won the T20I series 2–1. South Africa recorded twelve consecutive ODI wins that included a whitewash of Australia and Sri Lanka at home. The final Test series of the season saw Pakistan win their first ever Test series in the West Indies.

In men's associate and affiliate cricket, three matches of the Intercontinental Cup and six matches of the World Cricket League Championship were scheduled to take place. The results of these matches have so far seen Papua New Guinea move into first place in the World Cricket League Championship and fourth in the Intercontinental Cup. Additional international tours and tournaments were also scheduled among the top associates and affiliates: UAE vs Oman, Hong Kong vs Papua New Guinea, Afghanistan vs Ireland, the 2017 Desert T20 Challenge, and the 2016–17 United Arab Emirates Tri-Nation Series. Afghanistan also played a three match series against Bangladesh (losing 2–1), and Ireland played ODIs against South Africa and Australia, losing both. In addition, another step in the 2019 Cricket World Cup qualification process was completed with the United States and Oman being promoted into World Cricket League Division 3.

This season also saw conclusion of the 2014–16 ICC Women's Championship, with the final seven series (matches from rounds 6 and 7) being scheduled in this period. At the conclusion of these matches, Australia, England, New Zealand, and the West Indies were the top four teams of the tournament, and therefore gained direct qualification for the 2017 Women's Cricket World Cup. The bottom four teams (India, South Africa, Pakistan and Sri Lanka) are placed in the 2017 Women's Cricket World Cup Qualifier, along with Bangladesh, Ireland, Zimbabwe, Thailand, Papua New Guinea and Scotland. There was some controversy, however, as the series between India and Pakistan was supposed to be scheduled in this time period, but the series never went ahead. As a result, the ICC Technical Committee ruled that India's Women's team had forfeited all of the matches, with the points being awarded to Pakistan, effectively consigning India to the bottom four. The 2016 Women's Twenty20 Asia Cup was also played during this season, with India winning their sixth consecutive title. The tournament opener, between India and Bangladesh, saw history as Bangladesh was bowled out for 54, which is the lowest total in Women's Twenty20 Internationals. However, this record stood for only four days, as later on in the tournament, Bangladesh were bowled out for 44 by Pakistan.

== Season overview ==
Men's international tours
Start date	Home team	Away team	Results [Matches]				
Start date	Home team	Away team	Test	ODI	T20I	FC	LA
22 September 2016	India	New Zealand	3–0 [3]	3–2 [5]	—	—	—
23 September 2016	Pakistan	West Indies	2–1 [3]	3–0 [3]	3–0 [3]	—	—
25 September 2016	Bangladesh	Afghanistan	—	2–1 [3]	—	—	—
25 September 2016	South Africa	Ireland	—	1–0 [1]	—	—	—
27 September 2016	(South Africa) Australia	Ireland	—	1–0 [1]	—	—	—
30 September 2016	South Africa	Australia	—	5–0 [5]	—	—	—
7 October 2016	Bangladesh	England	1–1 [2]	1–2 [3]	—	—	—
13 October 2016	UAE	Oman	—	—	—	—	2–1 [3]
17 October 2016	PNG	Namibia	—	—	—	1–0 [1]	2–0 [2]
29 October 2016	Zimbabwe	Sri Lanka	0–2 [2]	—	—	—	—
3 November 2016	Australia	South Africa	1–2 [3]	—	—	—	—
4 November 2016	Hong Kong	PNG	—	2–1 [3]	—	—	—
9 November 2016	India	England	4–0 [5]	2–1 [3]	2–1 [3]	—	—
17 November 2016	New Zealand	Pakistan	2–0 [2]	—	—	—	—
18 November 2016	Kenya	Hong Kong	—	—	—	—	1–1 [2]
4 December 2016	Australia	New Zealand	—	3–0 [3]	—	—	—
14 December 2016	UAE	Afghanistan	—	—	0–3 [3]	—	—
15 December 2016	Australia	Pakistan	3–0 [3]	4–1 [5]	—	—	—
26 December 2016	New Zealand	Bangladesh	2–0 [2]	3–0 [3]	3–0 [3]	—	—
26 December 2016	South Africa	Sri Lanka	3–0 [3]	5–0 [5]	1–2 [3]	—	—
30 January 2017	New Zealand	Australia	—	2–0 [3]	—	—	—
9 February 2017	India	Bangladesh	1–0 [1]	—	—	—	—
13 February 2017	Hong Kong	Netherlands	—	—	—	0–0 [1]	0–2 [2]
16 February 2017	Zimbabwe	Afghanistan	—	2–3 [5]	—	—	1–4 [5]
17 February 2017	New Zealand	South Africa	0–1 [3]	2–3 [5]	0–1 [1]	—	—
17 February 2017	Australia	Sri Lanka	—	—	1–2 [3]	—	—
23 February 2017	India	Australia	2–1 [4]	—	—	—	—
2 March 2017	UAE	Ireland	—	0–2 [2]	—	—	—
3 March 2017	West Indies	England	—	0–3 [3]	—	—	—
7 March 2017	Sri Lanka	Bangladesh	1–1 [2]	1–1 [3]	1–1 [2]	—	—
8 March 2017	(India) Afghanistan	Ireland	—	3–2 [5]	3–0 [3]	1–0 [1]	—
11 March 2017	Nepal	Kenya	—	—	—	—	1–1 [2]
26 March 2017	West Indies	Pakistan	1–2 [3]	1–2 [3]	1–3 [4]	—	—
31 March 2017	UAE	PNG	—	2–1 [3]	3–0 [3]	1–0 [1]	—
Men's international tournaments
Start date	Tournament				Winners		
29 October 2016	(United States) 2016 ICC World Cricket League Division Four				United States		
14 November 2016	2016–17 Zimbabwe Tri-Series				Sri Lanka		
14 January 2017	(United Arab Emirates) 2017 Desert T20 Challenge				Afghanistan		
22 January 2017	2016–17 United Arab Emirates Tri-Nation Series				United Arab Emirates		

Women's international tours
Start date	Home team	Away team	Results [Matches]	
Start date	Home team	Away team	WODI	WT20I
18 September 2016	Sri Lanka	Australia	0–4 [4]	0–1 [1]
8 October 2016	South Africa	New Zealand	2–5 [7]	—
8 October 2016	West Indies	England	2–3 [5]	—
9 November 2016	New Zealand	Pakistan	5–0 [5]	1–0 [1]
9 November 2016	Sri Lanka	England	0–4 [4]	—
10 November 2016	India	West Indies	3–0 [3]	0–3 [3]
18 November 2016	Australia	South Africa	4–0 [5]	—
12 January 2017	Bangladesh	South Africa	1–4 [5]	—
17 February 2017	Australia	New Zealand	—	1–2 [3]
26 February 2017	New Zealand	Australia	1–2 [3]	—
Women's international tournaments
Start date	Tournament			Winners
26 November 2016	(Thailand) 2016 Women's Twenty20 Asia Cup			India
7 February 2017	(Sri Lanka) 2017 ICC Women's Cricket World Cup Qualifier			India

Youth international tournaments
Start date	Tournament	Winners
15 December 2016	(Sri Lanka) 2016 Under-19 Asia Cup	India

== Rankings ==
The following are the rankings at the beginning of the season:

ICC Test Championship 4 September 2016
Rank	Team	Matches	Points	Rating
1	Pakistan	25	2767	111
2	India	25	2748	110
3	Australia	36	3905	108
4	England	41	4427	108
5	South Africa	25	2412	96
6	Sri Lanka	32	3055	95
7	New Zealand	31	2949	95
8	West Indies	26	1749	67
9	Bangladesh	12	687	57
10	Zimbabwe	7	54	8

ICC ODI Championship 4 September 2016
Rank	Team	Matches	Points	Rating
1	Australia	45	5576	124
2	New Zealand	41	4631	113
3	India	48	5278	110
4	South Africa	46	5047	110
5	England	51	5469	107
6	Sri Lanka	56	5657	101
7	Bangladesh	24	2347	98
8	West Indies	30	2808	94
9	Pakistan	48	4129	86
10	Afghanistan	23	1122	49
11	Zimbabwe	46	2112	46
12	Ireland	18	769	43

ICC T20I Championship 9 September 2016
Rank	Team	Matches	Points	Rating
1	New Zealand	20	2635	132
2	India	26	3284	126
3	West Indies	19	2370	125
4	South Africa	23	2734	119
5	Australia	21	2390	114
6	England	22	2481	113
7	Pakistan	29	3090	107
8	Sri Lanka	28	2630	94
9	Afghanistan	22	1725	78
10	Bangladesh	23	1708	74
11	Netherlands	10	667	67
12	Zimbabwe	22	1358	62
13	Scotland	11	622	57
14	United Arab Emirates	14	757	54
15	Ireland	12	505	42
16	Oman	12	442	37
17	Hong Kong	16	538	34
Insufficient matches
	Papua New Guinea	5	—	44

ICC Women's Rankings 4 September 2016
Rank	Team	Matches	Points	Rating
1	Australia	59	7524	128
2	England	55	6829	124
3	New Zealand	56	6424	115
4	India	45	4827	107
5	West Indies	60	6263	104
6	South Africa	61	5600	92
7	Pakistan	56	4500	80
8	Sri Lanka	55	3922	71
9	Bangladesh	22	985	45
10	Ireland	25	775	31

== September ==
=== Australia Women in Sri Lanka ===
WODI series
No.	Date	Home captain	Away captain	Venue	Result
WODI 992	18 September	Chamari Athapaththu	Meg Lanning	Rangiri Dambulla International Stadium, Dambulla	Australia by 4 wickets
WODI 993	20 September	Chamari Athapaththu	Meg Lanning	Rangiri Dambulla International Stadium, Dambulla	Australia by 78 runs
WODI 994	23 September	Chamari Athapaththu	Meg Lanning	R. Premadasa Stadium, Colombo	Australia by 9 wickets
WODI 995	25 September	Chamari Athapaththu	Meg Lanning	R. Premadasa Stadium, Colombo	Australia by 137 runs
WT20I series
No.	Date	Home captain	Away captain	Venue	Result
WT20I 369	27 September	Hasini Perera	Meg Lanning	Sinhalese Sports Club Ground, Colombo	Australia by 10 wickets

=== New Zealand in India ===
Test series
No.	Date	Home captain	Away captain	Venue	Result
Test 2221	22–26 September	Virat Kohli	Kane Williamson	Green Park Stadium, Kanpur	India by 197 runs
Test 2222	30 September–4 October	Virat Kohli	Ross Taylor	Eden Gardens, Kolkata	India by 178 runs
Test 2223	8–12 October	Virat Kohli	Kane Williamson	Holkar Stadium, Indore	India by 321 runs
ODI series
No.	Date	Home captain	Away captain	Venue	Result
ODI 3796	16 October	MS Dhoni	Kane Williamson	Himachal Pradesh Cricket Association Stadium, Dharamshala	India by 6 wickets
ODI 3797	20 October	MS Dhoni	Kane Williamson	Feroz Shah Kotla Ground, Delhi	New Zealand by 6 runs
ODI 3798	23 October	MS Dhoni	Kane Williamson	Punjab Cricket Association IS Bindra Stadium, Mohali	India by 7 wickets
ODI 3799	26 October	MS Dhoni	Kane Williamson	JSCA International Stadium Complex, Ranchi	New Zealand by 19 runs
ODI 3800	29 October	MS Dhoni	Kane Williamson	Dr. Y.S. Rajasekhara Reddy ACA-VDCA Cricket Stadium, Visakhapatnam	India by 190 runs

=== West Indies vs Pakistan in United Arab Emirates ===
T20I series
No.	Date	Home captain	Away captain	Venue	Result
T20I 568	23 September	Sarfaraz Ahmed	Carlos Brathwaite	Dubai International Cricket Stadium, Dubai	Pakistan by 9 wickets
T20I 569	24 September	Sarfaraz Ahmed	Carlos Brathwaite	Dubai International Cricket Stadium, Dubai	Pakistan by 16 runs
T20I 570	27 September	Sarfaraz Ahmed	Carlos Brathwaite	Sheikh Zayed Cricket Stadium, Abu Dhabi	Pakistan by 8 wickets
ODI series
No.	Date	Home captain	Away captain	Venue	Result
ODI 3784	30 September	Azhar Ali	Jason Holder	Sharjah Cricket Stadium, Sharjah	Pakistan by 111 runs (DLS)
ODI 3788	2 October	Azhar Ali	Jason Holder	Sharjah Cricket Stadium, Sharjah	Pakistan by 59 runs
ODI 3789	5 October	Azhar Ali	Jason Holder	Sheikh Zayed Cricket Stadium, Abu Dhabi	Pakistan by 136 runs
Test series
No.	Date	Home captain	Away captain	Venue	Result
Test 2224	13–17 October	Misbah ul Haq	Jason Holder	Dubai International Cricket Stadium, Dubai	Pakistan by 56 runs
Test 2226	21–25 October	Misbah ul Haq	Jason Holder	Sheikh Zayed Cricket Stadium, Abu Dhabi	Pakistan by 133 runs
Test 2229	30 October–3 November	Misbah ul Haq	Jason Holder	Sharjah Cricket Stadium, Sharjah	West Indies by 5 wickets

=== Afghanistan in Bangladesh ===
ODI series
No.	Date	Home captain	Away captain	Venue	Result
ODI 3781	25 September	Mashrafe Mortaza	Asghar Stanikzai	Sher-e-Bangla National Cricket Stadium, Mirpur	Bangladesh by 7 runs
ODI 3783	28 September	Mashrafe Mortaza	Asghar Stanikzai	Sher-e-Bangla National Cricket Stadium, Mirpur	Afghanistan by 2 wickets
ODI 3786	1 October	Mashrafe Mortaza	Asghar Stanikzai	Sher-e-Bangla National Cricket Stadium, Mirpur	Bangladesh by 141 runs

=== Ireland in South Africa ===
Only ODI
No.	Date	Home captain	Away captain	Venue	Result
ODI 3780	25 September	Faf du Plessis	William Porterfield	Willowmoore Park, Benoni	South Africa by 206 runs

=== Australia vs. Ireland in South Africa ===
Only ODI
No.	Date	Team 1 captain	Team 2 captain	Venue	Result
ODI 3782	27 September	Steve Smith	William Porterfield	Willowmoore Park, Benoni	Australia by 9 wickets

=== Australia in South Africa ===
ODI series
No.	Date	Home captain	Away captain	Venue	Result
ODI 3785	30 September	Faf du Plessis	Steve Smith	Centurion Park, Centurion	South Africa by 6 wickets
ODI 3787	2 October	Faf du Plessis	Steve Smith	Wanderers Stadium, Johannesburg	South Africa by 142 runs
ODI 3790	5 October	Faf du Plessis	Steve Smith	Kingsmead Cricket Ground, Durban	South Africa by 4 wickets
ODI 3792	9 October	Faf du Plessis	Steve Smith	St George's Oval, Port Elizabeth	South Africa by 6 wickets
ODI 3795	12 October	Faf du Plessis	Steve Smith	Newlands Cricket Ground, Cape Town	South Africa by 31 runs

== October ==
=== England in Bangladesh ===
ODI series
No.	Date	Home captain	Away captain	Venue	Result
ODI 3791	7 October	Mashrafe Mortaza	Jos Buttler	Sher-e-Bangla National Cricket Stadium, Mirpur	England by 21 runs
ODI 3793	9 October	Mashrafe Mortaza	Jos Buttler	Sher-e-Bangla National Cricket Stadium, Mirpur	Bangladesh by 34 runs
ODI 3794	12 October	Mashrafe Mortaza	Jos Buttler	Zohur Ahmed Chowdhury Stadium, Chittagong	England by 4 wickets
Test series
No.	Date	Home captain	Away captain	Venue	Result
Test 2225	20–24 October	Mushfiqur Rahim	Alastair Cook	Zohur Ahmed Chowdhury Stadium, Chittagong	England by 22 runs
Test 2227	28 October–1 November	Mushfiqur Rahim	Alastair Cook	Sher-e-Bangla National Cricket Stadium, Mirpur	Bangladesh by 108 runs

=== New Zealand Women in South Africa ===
WODI series
No.	Date	Home captain	Away captain	Venue	Result
WODI 996	8 October	Dane van Niekerk	Suzie Bates	De Beers Diamond Oval, Kimberley	New Zealand by 12 runs
WODI 999	11 October	Dane van Niekerk	Suzie Bates	De Beers Diamond Oval, Kimberley	South Africa by 4 wickets
WODI 1000	13 October	Dane van Niekerk	Suzie Bates	De Beers Diamond Oval, Kimberley	New Zealand by 9 wickets
WODI 1003	17 October	Dane van Niekerk	Suzie Bates	Boland Bank Park, Paarl	New Zealand by 8 wickets
WODI 1004	19 October	Dane van Niekerk	Suzie Bates	Stellenbosch University Ground, Stellenbosch	New Zealand by 95 runs
WODI 1006	22 October	Dane van Niekerk	Suzie Bates	Boland Bank Park, Paarl	South Africa by 5 wickets
WODI 1007	24 October	Dane van Niekerk	Suzie Bates	Boland Bank Park, Paarl	New Zealand by 126 runs

=== England Women in West Indies ===
WODI series
No.	Date	Home captain	Away captain	Venue	Result
WODI 997	8 October	Stafanie Taylor	Heather Knight	Trelawny Stadium, Montego Bay	England by 5 runs
WODI 998	10 October	Stafanie Taylor	Heather Knight	Trelawny Stadium, Montego Bay	West Indies by 38 runs
WODI 1001	14 October	Stafanie Taylor	Heather Knight	Sabina Park, Kingston	England by 112 runs
WODI 1002	16 October	Stafanie Taylor	Heather Knight	Sabina Park, Kingston	West Indies by 42 runs
WODI 1005	19 October	Stafanie Taylor	Heather Knight	Sabina Park, Kingston	England by 5 wickets

=== Oman in United Arab Emirates ===
List A series
No.	Date	Home captain	Away captain	Venue	Result
1st List A	13 October	Muhammed Shanil	Ajay Lalcheta	ICC Global Cricket Academy, Dubai	United Arab Emirates by 40 runs
2nd List A	15 October	Muhammed Shanil	Ajay Lalcheta	ICC Global Cricket Academy, Dubai	United Arab Emirates by 6 wickets
3rd List A	17 October	Muhammed Shanil	Ajay Lalcheta	ICC Global Cricket Academy, Dubai	Oman by 72 runs

=== Namibia in Papua New Guinea ===
2015–17 ICC Intercontinental Cup - FC series
No.	Date	Home captain	Away captain	Venue	Result
First-class	16–19 October	Assad Vala	Sarel Burger	Amini Park, Port Moresby	Papua New Guinea by 199 runs
2015–17 ICC World Cricket League Championship - List A series
No.	Date	Home captain	Away captain	Venue	Result
1st List A	21 October	Assad Vala	Sarel Burger	Amini Park, Port Moresby	Papua New Guinea by 5 wickets
2nd List A	23 October	Assad Vala	Sarel Burger	Amini Park, Port Moresby	Papua New Guinea by 6 wickets

=== Sri Lanka in Zimbabwe ===
Test series
No.	Date	Home captain	Away captain	Venue	Result
Test 2228	29 October–2 November	Graeme Cremer	Rangana Herath	Harare Sports Club, Harare	Sri Lanka by 225 runs
Test 2231	6–10 November	Graeme Cremer	Rangana Herath	Harare Sports Club, Harare	Sri Lanka by 257 runs

=== 2016 ICC World Cricket League Division Four ===
Pos	Team	Pld	W	L	T	NR	Pts	NRR	Promotion or relegation
1	Oman	5	4	1	0	0	8	0.177	Promoted to 2017 Division Three
2	United States	5	3	2	0	0	6	0.897	Promoted to 2017 Division Three
3	Denmark	5	3	2	0	0	6	0.308	Remain in 2018 Division Four
4	Bermuda	5	2	3	0	0	4	−0.067	Remain in 2018 Division Four
5	Jersey	5	2	3	0	0	4	−0.598	Relegated to 2017 Division Five
6	Italy	5	1	4	0	0	2	−0.651	Relegated to 2017 Division Five

Source: Cricinfo

Group stage
No.	Date	Team 1	Captain 1	Team 2	Captain 2	Venue	Result
Match 1	29 October	Bermuda	Oliver Pitcher	United States	Steven Taylor	Leo Magnus Cricket Complex	United States by 8 wickets
Match 2	29 October	Denmark	Michael Pedersen	Italy	Damian Crowley	Leo Magnus Cricket Complex	Denmark by 114 runs
Match 3	29 October	Jersey	Peter Gough	Oman	Ajay Lalcheta	Leo Magnus Cricket Complex	Oman by 6 wickets
Match 4	30 October	Bermuda	Oliver Pitcher	Oman	Ajay Lalcheta	Leo Magnus Cricket Complex	Oman by 4 wickets
Match 5	30 October	Denmark	Michael Pedersen	Jersey	Peter Gough	Leo Magnus Cricket Complex	Denmark by 6 wickets
Match 6	30 October	Italy	Damian Crowley	United States	Steven Taylor	Leo Magnus Cricket Complex	United States by 1 wicket
Match 7	1 November	Bermuda	Oliver Pitcher	Denmark	Michael Pedersen	Leo Magnus Cricket Complex	Bermuda by 38 runs
Match 8	1 November	Italy	Damian Crowley	Jersey	Peter Gough	Leo Magnus Cricket Complex	Jersey by 3 wickets
Match 9	1 November	Oman	Ajay Lalcheta	United States	Steven Taylor	Leo Magnus Cricket Complex	United States by 8 wickets
Match 10	2 November	Bermuda	Oliver Pitcher	Jersey	Peter Gough	Leo Magnus Cricket Complex	Bermuda by 85 runs (DLS)
Match 11	2 November	Denmark	Amjad Khan	United States	Steven Taylor	Leo Magnus Cricket Complex	Denmark by 4 wickets
Match 12	2 November	Italy	Damian Crowley	Oman	Ajay Lalcheta	Leo Magnus Cricket Complex	Oman by 5 wickets
Match 13	4 November	Bermuda	Oliver Pitcher	Italy	Damian Crowley	Leo Magnus Cricket Complex	Italy by 25 runs
Match 14	4 November	Denmark	Amjad Khan	Oman	Ajay Lalcheta	Leo Magnus Cricket Complex	Oman by 43 runs
Match 15	4 November	Jersey	Peter Gough	United States	Steven Taylor	Leo Magnus Cricket Complex	Jersey by 1 run
Playoffs
5th Place Playoff	5 November	Italy	Damian Crowley	Jersey	Peter Gough	Leo Magnus Cricket Complex	Jersey by 42 runs
3rd Place Playoff	5 November	Bermuda	Oliver Pitcher	Denmark	Amjad Khan	Leo Magnus Cricket Complex	Denmark by 44 runs
Final	5 November	United States	Steven Taylor	Oman	Ajay Lalcheta	Leo Magnus Cricket Complex	United States by 13 runs

==== Final standings ====
Pos	Team	Status
1st	United States	Promoted to 2017 ICC World Cricket League Division Three
2nd	Oman	Promoted to 2017 ICC World Cricket League Division Three
3rd	Denmark	Remained in 2018 Division Four
4th	Bermuda	Remained in 2018 Division Four
5th	Jersey	Relegated to 2017 Division Five
6th	Italy	Relegated to 2017 Division Five

== November ==
=== South Africa in Australia ===
Test series
No.	Date	Home captain	Away captain	Venue	Result
Test 2230	3–7 November	Steve Smith	Faf du Plessis	WACA Ground, Perth	South Africa by 177 runs
Test 2233	12–16 November	Steve Smith	Faf du Plessis	Bellerive Oval, Hobart	South Africa by an innings and 80 runs
Test 2236	24–28 November	Steve Smith	Faf du Plessis	Adelaide Oval, Adelaide	Australia by 7 wickets

=== Papua New Guinea in Hong Kong ===
ODIs series
No.	Date	Home captain	Away captain	Venue	Result
ODI 3801	4 November	Babar Hayat	Assad Vala	Mission Road Ground, Mong Kok	Hong Kong by 106 runs
ODI 3802	6 November	Babar Hayat	Assad Vala	Mission Road Ground, Mong Kok	Papua New Guinea by 14 runs
ODI 3803	8 November	Babar Hayat	Assad Vala	Mission Road Ground, Mong Kok	Hong Kong by 7 wickets (DLS)

=== England in India ===
2016 Anthony De Mello Trophy – Test series
No.	Date	Home captain	Away captain	Venue	Result
Test 2232	9–13 November	Virat Kohli	Alastair Cook	Saurashtra Cricket Association Stadium, Rajkot	Match drawn
Test 2235	17–21 November	Virat Kohli	Alastair Cook	Dr. Y.S. Rajasekhara Reddy ACA-VDCA Cricket Stadium, Visakhapatnam	India by 246 runs
Test 2238	26–30 November	Virat Kohli	Alastair Cook	Punjab Cricket Association IS Bindra Stadium, Mohali	India by 8 wickets
Test 2239	8–12 December	Virat Kohli	Alastair Cook	Wankhede Stadium, Mumbai	India by an innings and 36 runs
Test 2241	16–20 December	Virat Kohli	Alastair Cook	M. A. Chidambaram Stadium, Chennai	India by an innings and 75 runs
ODI series
No.	Date	Home captain	Away captain	Venue	Result
ODI 3819	15 January	Virat Kohli	Eoin Morgan	Maharashtra Cricket Association Stadium, Pune	India by 3 wickets
ODI 3821	19 January	Virat Kohli	Eoin Morgan	Barabati Stadium, Cuttack	India by 15 runs
ODI 3823	22 January	Virat Kohli	Eoin Morgan	Eden Gardens, Kolkata	England by 5 runs
T20I series
No.	Date	Home captain	Away captain	Venue	Result
T20I 592	26 January	Virat Kohli	Eoin Morgan	Green Park Stadium, Kanpur	England by 7 wickets
T20I 593	29 January	Virat Kohli	Eoin Morgan	Vidarbha Cricket Association Stadium, Nagpur	India by 5 runs
T20I 594	1 February	Virat Kohli	Eoin Morgan	M. Chinnaswamy Stadium, Bangalore	India by 75 runs

=== Pakistan Women in New Zealand ===
WODI series
No.	Date	Home captain	Away captain	Venue	Result
WODI 1008	9 November	Suzie Bates	Sana Mir	Bert Sutcliffe Oval, Lincoln	New Zealand by 8 wickets
WODI 1011	11 November	Suzie Bates	Sana Mir	Bert Sutcliffe Oval, Lincoln	New Zealand by 60 runs (DLS)
WODI 1013	13 November	Suzie Bates	Sana Mir	Bert Sutcliffe Oval, Lincoln	New Zealand by 8 wickets
WODI 1017	17 November	Suzie Bates	Sana Mir	Saxton Oval, Nelson	New Zealand by 7 wickets
WODI 1020	19 November	Suzie Bates	Sana Mir	Saxton Oval, Nelson	New Zealand by 5 wickets
WT20I series
No.	Date	Home captain	Away captain	Venue	Result
WT20I 372	21 November	Suzie Bates	Bismah Maroof	Saxton Oval, Nelson	New Zealand by 14 runs

=== England Women in Sri Lanka ===
WODI series
No.	Date	Home captain	Away captain	Venue	Result
WODI 1009	9 November	Inoka Ranaweera	Heather Knight	Sinhalese Sports Club Ground, Colombo	England by 8 wickets
WODI 1012	12 November	Inoka Ranaweera	Heather Knight	R. Premadasa Stadium, Colombo	England by 122 runs
WODI 1015	15 November	Inoka Ranaweera	Danielle Hazell	R. Premadasa Stadium, Colombo	England by 5 wickets
WODI 1018	17–18 November	Inoka Ranaweera	Heather Knight	R. Premadasa Stadium, Colombo	England by 162 runs

=== West Indies Women in India ===
WODI series
No.	Date	Home captain	Away captain	Venue	Result
WODI 1010	10 November	Mithali Raj	Stafanie Taylor	Mulapadu Cricket Ground, Vijayawada	India by 6 wickets
WODI 1014	14 November	Mithali Raj	Stafanie Taylor	Mulapadu Cricket Ground, Vijayawada	India by 5 wickets
WODI 1016	16 November	Mithali Raj	Stafanie Taylor	Mulapadu Cricket Ground, Vijayawada	India by 15 runs
WT20I series
No.	Date	Home captain	Away captain	Venue	Result
WT20I 370	18 November	Harmanpreet Kaur	Stafanie Taylor	Mulapadu Cricket Ground, Vijayawada	West Indies by 6 wickets
WT20I 371	20 November	Harmanpreet Kaur	Stafanie Taylor	Mulapadu Cricket Ground, Vijayawada	West Indies by 31 runs
WT20I 373	22 November	Harmanpreet Kaur	Stafanie Taylor	Mulapadu Cricket Ground, Vijayawada	West Indies by 15 runs

=== 2016–17 Zimbabwe Tri-Series ===
Pos	Team	Pld	W	L	T	NR	BP	Pts	NRR
1	Sri Lanka	4	2	1	0	1	1	11	0.488
2	Zimbabwe	4	1	1	1	1	0	8	−1.020
3	West Indies	4	1	2	1	0	1	7	0.315

Source: ESPNcricinfo

Qualified for the Final

Group stage
No.	Date	Team 1	Captain 1	Team 2	Captain 2	Venue	Result
ODI 3804	14 November	Zimbabwe	Graeme Cremer	Sri Lanka	Upul Tharanga	Harare Sports Club, Harare	Sri Lanka by 8 wickets
ODI 3805	16 November	West Indies	Jason Holder	Sri Lanka	Upul Tharanga	Harare Sports Club, Harare	West Indies by 62 runs
ODI 3806	19 November	West Indies	Jason Holder	Zimbabwe	Graeme Cremer	Queens Sports Club, Bulawayo	Match tied
ODI 3807	21 November	Zimbabwe	Graeme Cremer	Sri Lanka	Upul Tharanga	Queens Sports Club, Bulawayo	No result
ODI 3808	23 November	West Indies	Jason Holder	Sri Lanka	Upul Tharanga	Queens Sports Club, Bulawayo	Sri Lanka by 1 run
ODI 3809	25 November	West Indies	Jason Holder	Zimbabwe	Graeme Cremer	Queens Sports Club, Bulawayo	Zimbabwe by 5 runs (DLS)
Final
ODI 3810	27 November	Zimbabwe	Graeme Cremer	Sri Lanka	Upul Tharanga	Queens Sports Club, Bulawayo	Sri Lanka by 6 wickets

=== Pakistan in New Zealand ===
Test series
No.	Date	Home captain	Away captain	Venue	Result
Test 2234	17–21 November	Kane Williamson	Misbah-ul-Haq	Hagley Oval, Christchurch	New Zealand by 8 wickets
Test 2237	25–29 November	Kane Williamson	Azhar Ali	Seddon Park, Hamilton	New Zealand by 138 runs

=== Hong Kong in Kenya ===
2015–17 ICC World Cricket League Championship - List A series
No.	Date	Home captain	Away captain	Venue	Result
1st List A	18 November	Rakep Patel	Babar Hayat	Gymkhana Club Ground, Nairobi	Kenya by 3 wickets (DLS)
2nd List A	20 November	Rakep Patel	Babar Hayat	Gymkhana Club Ground, Nairobi	Hong Kong by 39 runs (DLS)

=== South Africa Women in Australia ===
WODI series
No.	Date	Home captain	Away captain	Venue	Result
WODI 1019	18 November	Meg Lanning	Dane van Niekerk	Manuka Oval, Canberra	Australia by 2 wickets
WODI 1021	20 November	Meg Lanning	Dane van Niekerk	Manuka Oval, Canberra	Australia by 66 runs (DLS)
WODI 1022	23 November	Meg Lanning	Dane van Niekerk	North Sydney Oval, Sydney	Australia by 9 wickets
WODI 1023	27 November	Meg Lanning	Dane van Niekerk	International Sports Stadium, Coffs Harbour	Match tied
WODI 1024	29 November	Meg Lanning	Dane van Niekerk	International Sports Stadium, Coffs Harbour	Australia by 43 runs

=== 2016 Women's Twenty20 Asia Cup ===
Pos	Team	Pld	W	L	T	NR	BP	Pts	NRR
1	India	5	5	0	0	0	0	10	2.723
2	Pakistan	5	4	1	0	0	0	8	1.540
3	Sri Lanka	5	3	2	0	0	0	6	1.037
4	Bangladesh	5	2	3	0	0	0	4	0.135
5	Thailand	5	1	4	0	0	0	2	−1.797
6	Nepal	5	0	5	0	0	0	0	−3.582

Source: ESPNcricinfo

Qualified for the final

Group stage
No.	Date	Team 1	Captain 1	Team 2	Captain 2	Venue	Result
1st match	26 November	India	Harmanpreet Kaur	Bangladesh	Jahanara Alam	Asian Institute of Technology Ground, Bangkok	India by 64 runs
2nd match	26 November	Pakistan	Bismah Maroof	Nepal	Rubina Chhetry	Asian Institute of Technology Ground, Bangkok	Pakistan by 9 wickets
3rd match	27 November	India	Harmanpreet Kaur	Thailand	Sornnarin Tippoch	Asian Institute of Technology Ground, Bangkok	India by 9 wickets
4th match	27 November	Sri Lanka	Hasini Perera	Pakistan	Bismah Maroof	Asian Institute of Technology Ground, Bangkok	Pakistan by 8 wickets
5th match	28 November	Thailand	Sornnarin Tippoch	Bangladesh	Jahanara Alam	Asian Institute of Technology Ground, Bangkok	Bangladesh by 35 runs
6th match	28 November	Nepal	Rubina Chhetry	Sri Lanka	Hasini Perera	Asian Institute of Technology Ground, Bangkok	Sri Lanka by 8 wickets
7th match	29 November	India	Harmanpreet Kaur	Pakistan	Bismah Maroof	Asian Institute of Technology Ground, Bangkok	India by 5 wickets
8th match	29 November	Nepal	Rubina Chhetry	Bangladesh	Jahanara Alam	Asian Institute of Technology Ground, Bangkok	Bangladesh by 92 runs
9th match	30 November	Bangladesh	Jahanara Alam	Pakistan	Bismah Maroof	Asian Institute of Technology Ground, Bangkok	Pakistan by 9 wickets
10th match	30 November	Thailand	Sornnarin Tippoch	Sri Lanka	Hasini Perera	Asian Institute of Technology Ground, Bangkok	Sri Lanka by 75 runs
11th match	1 December	Thailand	Sornnarin Tippoch	Nepal	Rubina Chhetry	Asian Institute of Technology Ground, Bangkok	Thailand by 8 wickets
12th match	1 December	India	Harmanpreet Kaur	Sri Lanka	Hasini Perera	Asian Institute of Technology Ground, Bangkok	India by 52 runs
13th match	2 December	India	Harmanpreet Kaur	Nepal	Rubina Chhetry	Terdthai Cricket Ground, Bangkok	India by 99 runs
14th match	3 December	Bangladesh	Jahanara Alam	Sri Lanka	Hasini Perera	Terdthai Cricket Ground, Bangkok	Sri Lanka by 7 wickets
15th match	3 December	Pakistan	Bismah Maroof	Thailand	Sornnarin Tippoch	Terdthai Cricket Ground, Bangkok	Pakistan by 5 wickets
Final
Final	4 December	India	Harmanpreet Kaur	Pakistan	Bismah Maroof	Asian Institute of Technology Ground, Bangkok	India by 17 runs

== December ==
=== New Zealand in Australia ===
2016 Chappell–Hadlee Trophy - ODI series
No.	Date	Home captain	Away captain	Venue	Result
ODI 3811	4 December	Steve Smith	Kane Williamson	Sydney Cricket Ground, Sydney	Australia by 68 runs
ODI 3812	6 December	Steve Smith	Kane Williamson	Manuka Oval, Canberra	Australia by 116 runs
ODI 3813	9 December	Steve Smith	Kane Williamson	Melbourne Cricket Ground, Melbourne	Australia by 117 runs

=== Afghanistan in United Arab Emirates ===
T20I series
No.	Date	Home captain	Away captain	Venue	Result
T20I 571	14 December	Amjad Javed	Asghar Stanikzai	ICC Academy Ground, Dubai	Afghanistan by 11 runs
T20I 572	16 December	Amjad Javed	Asghar Stanikzai	Dubai International Cricket Stadium, Dubai	Afghanistan by 5 wickets
T20I 573	18 December	Rohan Mustafa	Asghar Stanikzai	ICC Academy Ground, Dubai	Afghanistan by 44 runs

=== Pakistan in Australia ===
Test series
No.	Date	Home captain	Away captain	Venue	Result
Test 2240	15–19 December	Steve Smith	Misbah-ul-Haq	The Gabba, Brisbane	Australia by 39 runs
Test 2242	26–30 December	Steve Smith	Misbah-ul-Haq	Melbourne Cricket Ground, Melbourne	Australia by an innings and 18 runs
Test 2245	3–7 January	Steve Smith	Misbah-ul-Haq	Sydney Cricket Ground, Sydney	Australia by 220 runs
ODI series
No.	Date	Home captain	Away captain	Venue	Result
ODI 3817	13 January	Steve Smith	Azhar Ali	The Gabba, Brisbane	Australia by 92 runs
ODI 3818	15 January	Steve Smith	Mohammad Hafeez	Melbourne Cricket Ground, Melbourne	Pakistan by 6 wickets
ODI 3820	19 January	Steve Smith	Mohammad Hafeez	WACA Ground, Perth	Australia by 7 wickets
ODI 3822	22 January	Steve Smith	Azhar Ali	Sydney Cricket Ground, Sydney	Australia by 86 runs
ODI 3826	26 January	Steve Smith	Azhar Ali	Adelaide Oval, Adelaide	Australia by 57 runs

=== 2016 Under-19 Asia Cup ===
Pos	Team	Pld	W	L	NR	BP	Pts	NRR
1	India	3	3	0	0	3	15	2.554
2	Sri Lanka (H)	3	2	1	0	1	9	0.746
3	Nepal	3	1	2	0	0	4	−0.334
4	Malaysia	3	0	3	0	0	0	−2.817

Source: ESPNcricinfo
(H) Host

Advanced to semi-finals

Pos	Team	Pld	W	L	NR	BP	Pts	NRR
1	Bangladesh	3	2	1	0	1	9	1.584
2	Afghanistan	3	2	1	0	1	9	1.425
3	Pakistan	3	2	1	0	1	9	1.368
4	Singapore	3	0	3	0	0	0	−11.312

Source: ESPNcricinfo

Advanced to semi-finals

Group stage
No.	Date	Team 1	Captain 1	Team 2	Captain 2	Venue	Result
1st Match	15 December	India	Abhishek Sharma	Malaysia	Virandeep Singh	Colombo Cricket Club Ground, Colombo	India won by 235 runs
2nd Match	15 December	Pakistan	Nasir Nawaz	Singapore	Janak Prakash	Galle International Stadium, Galle	Pakistan by 9 wickets
3rd Match	15 December	Sri Lanka	Kamindu Mendis	Nepal	Sandeep Lamichhane	Nondescripts Cricket Club Ground, Colombo	Sri Lanka by 1 run
4th Match	15 December	Afghanistan	Naveen-ul-Haq	Bangladesh	Abdul Halim	Uyanwatte Stadium, Matara	Bangladesh by 4 wickets
5th Match	16 December	Sri Lanka	Kamindu Mendis	Malaysia	Virandeep Singh	Tyronne Fernando Stadium, Moratuwa	Sri Lanka by 8 wickets
6th Match	16 December	Singapore	Janak Prakash	Bangladesh	Abdul Halim	Galle International Stadium, Galle	Bangladesh by 7 wickets
7th Match	16 December	Nepal	Sandeep Lamichhane	India	Abhishek Sharma	Colombo Cricket Club Ground, Colombo	India by 6 wickets
8th Match	16 December	Afghanistan	Naveen-ul-Haq	Pakistan	Nasir Nawaz	Uyanwatte Stadium, Matara	Afghanistan by 21 runs
9th Match	18 December	India	Abhishek Sharma	Sri Lanka	Kamindu Mendis	Tyronne Fernando Stadium, Moratuwa	India by 6 wickets
10th Match	18 December	Pakistan	Nasir Nawaz	Bangladesh	Abdul Halim	Galle International Stadium, Galle	Pakistan by 1 wicket
11th Match	18 December	Nepal	Sandeep Lamichhane	Malaysia	Virandeep Singh	Nondescripts Cricket Club Ground, Colombo	Nepal by 1 wicket
12th Match	18 December	Afghanistan	Naveen-ul-Haq	Singapore	Janak Prakash	Surrey Village Cricket Ground, Maggona	Afghanistan by 9 wickets
Knockout stage
No.	Date	Team 1	Captain 1	Team 2	Captain 2	Venue	Result
Semi-finals
1st Semi-final	20 December	India	Abhishek Sharma	Afghanistan	Naveen-ul-Haq	R. Premadasa Stadium, Colombo	India by 77 runs
2nd Semi-final	21 December	Bangladesh	Abdul Halim	Sri Lanka	Kamindu Mendis	R. Premadasa Stadium, Colombo	Sri Lanka by 26 runs (DLS)
Final
Final	23 December	India	Abhishek Sharma	Sri Lanka	Kamindu Mendis	R. Premadasa Stadium, Colombo	India by 34 runs

=== Bangladesh in New Zealand ===
ODI series
No.	Date	Home captain	Away captain	Venue	Result
ODI 3814	26 December	Kane Williamson	Mashrafe Mortaza	Hagley Oval, Christchurch	New Zealand by 77 runs
ODI 3815	29 December	Kane Williamson	Mashrafe Mortaza	Saxton Oval, Nelson	New Zealand by 67 runs
ODI 3816	31 December	Kane Williamson	Mashrafe Mortaza	Saxton Oval, Nelson	New Zealand by 8 wickets
T20I series
No.	Date	Home captain	Away captain	Venue	Result
T20I 574	3 January	Kane Williamson	Mashrafe Mortaza	McLean Park, Napier	New Zealand by 6 wickets
T20I 575	6 January	Kane Williamson	Mashrafe Mortaza	Bay Oval, Mount Maunganui	New Zealand by 47 runs
T20I 576	8 January	Kane Williamson	Mashrafe Mortaza	Bay Oval, Mount Maunganui	New Zealand by 27 runs
Test series
No.	Date	Home captain	Away captain	Venue	Result
Test 2246	12–16 January	Kane Williamson	Mushfiqur Rahim	Basin Reserve, Wellington	New Zealand by 7 wickets
Test 2248	20–24 January	Kane Williamson	Tamim Iqbal	Hagley Oval, Christchurch	New Zealand by 9 wickets

=== Sri Lanka in South Africa ===
Test series
No.	Date	Home captain	Away captain	Venue	Result
Test 2243	26–30 December	Faf du Plessis	Angelo Mathews	St George's Park, Port Elizabeth	South Africa by 206 runs
Test 2244	2–6 January	Faf du Plessis	Angelo Mathews	Newlands Cricket Ground, Cape Town	South Africa by 282 runs
Test 2247	12–16 January	Faf du Plessis	Angelo Mathews	Wanderers Stadium, Johannesburg	South Africa by an innings and 118 runs
T20I series
No.	Date	Home captain	Away captain	Venue	Result
T20I 589	20 January	Farhaan Behardien	Angelo Mathews	Centurion Park, Centurion	South Africa by 19 runs
T20I 590	22 January	Farhaan Behardien	Angelo Mathews	Wanderers Stadium, Johannesburg	Sri Lanka by 3 wickets
T20I 591	25 January	Farhaan Behardien	Dinesh Chandimal	Newlands Cricket Ground, Cape Town	Sri Lanka by 5 wickets
ODI series
No.	Date	Home captain	Away captain	Venue	Result
ODI 3828	28 January	AB de Villiers	Upul Tharanga	St George's Park, Port Elizabeth	South Africa by 8 wickets
ODI 3830	1 February	AB de Villiers	Upul Tharanga	Kingsmead Cricket Ground, Durban	South Africa by 121 runs
ODI 3831	4 February	AB de Villiers	Upul Tharanga	Wanderers Stadium, Johannesburg	South Africa by 7 wickets
ODI 3833	7 February	AB de Villiers	Upul Tharanga	Newlands Cricket Ground, Cape Town	South Africa by 40 runs
ODI 3834	10 February	AB de Villiers	Upul Tharanga	Centurion Park, Centurion	South Africa by 88 runs

== January ==
=== South Africa women in Bangladesh ===
WODI series
No.	Date	Home captain	Away captain	Venue	Result
WODI 1025	12 January	Rumana Ahmed	Dane van Niekerk	Sheikh Kamal International Cricket Stadium, Cox's Bazar	South Africa by 86 runs
WODI 1026	14 January	Rumana Ahmed	Dane van Niekerk	Sheikh Kamal International Cricket Stadium, Cox's Bazar	South Africa by 17 runs
WODI 1027	16 January	Rumana Ahmed	Dane van Niekerk	Sheikh Kamal International Cricket Stadium, Cox's Bazar	Bangladesh by 10 runs
WODI 1028	18 January	Rumana Ahmed	Dane van Niekerk	Sheikh Kamal International Cricket Stadium, Cox's Bazar	South Africa by 94 runs
WODI 1029	20 January	Rumana Ahmed	Dane van Niekerk	Sheikh Kamal International Cricket Stadium, Cox's Bazar	South Africa by 8 wickets

=== 2017 Desert T20 Challenge ===
Pos	Team	Pld	W	L	NR	Pts	NRR
1	Afghanistan	3	3	0	0	6	1.419
2	Ireland	3	2	1	0	4	0.319
3	United Arab Emirates	3	1	2	0	2	−0.552
4	Namibia	3	0	3	0	0	−1.177

Qualified to Finals

Pos	Team	Pld	W	L	NR	Pts	NRR
1	Scotland	3	3	0	0	6	0.666
2	Oman	3	1	2	0	2	0.890
3	Hong Kong	3	1	2	0	2	−0.005
4	Netherlands	3	1	2	0	2	−1.529

Qualified to Finals

Group stage
No.	Date	Team 1	Captain 1	Team 2	Captain 2	Venue	Result
T20I 577	14 January	Hong Kong	Babar Hayat	Scotland	Kyle Coetzer	Sheikh Zayed Cricket Stadium, Abu Dhabi	Scotland by 24 runs
T20I 578	14 January	Afghanistan	Asghar Stanikzai	Ireland	William Porterfield	Sheikh Zayed Cricket Stadium, Abu Dhabi	Afghanistan by 5 wickets
T20I 579	15 January	Netherlands	Peter Borren	Oman	Sultan Ahmed	Sheikh Zayed Cricket Stadium, Abu Dhabi	Netherlands by 5 wickets
Twenty20	15 January	United Arab Emirates	Amjad Javed	Namibia	Sarel Burger	Sheikh Zayed Cricket Stadium, Abu Dhabi	United Arab Emirates by 6 wickets
T20I 580	16 January	Hong Kong	Babar Hayat	Oman	Sultan Ahmed	Sheikh Zayed Cricket Stadium, Abu Dhabi	Oman by 7 wickets
T20I 581	16 January	United Arab Emirates	Amjad Javed	Afghanistan	Asghar Stanikzai	Sheikh Zayed Cricket Stadium, Abu Dhabi	Afghanistan by 5 wickets
Twenty20	17 January	Ireland	William Porterfield	Namibia	Sarel Burger	Sheikh Zayed Cricket Stadium, Abu Dhabi	Ireland by 5 wickets
T20I 582	17 January	Netherlands	Peter Borren	Scotland	Kyle Coetzer	Sheikh Zayed Cricket Stadium, Abu Dhabi	Scotland by 7 runs
T20I 583	18 January	United Arab Emirates	Amjad Javed	Ireland	William Porterfield	Dubai International Cricket Stadium, Dubai	Ireland by 24 runs
T20I 584	18 January	Hong Kong	Babar Hayat	Netherlands	Peter Borren	Dubai International Cricket Stadium, Dubai	Hong Kong by 91 runs
Twenty20	19 January	Afghanistan	Asghar Stanikzai	Namibia	Sarel Burger	Dubai International Cricket Stadium, Dubai	Afghanistan by 64 runs
T20I 585	19 January	Oman	Sultan Ahmed	Scotland	Kyle Coetzer	Dubai International Cricket Stadium, Dubai	Scotland by 7 wickets
Finals
T20I 586	20 January	Afghanistan	Asghar Stanikzai	Oman	Sultan Ahmed	Dubai International Cricket Stadium, Dubai	Afghanistan by 8 wickets
T20I 587	20 January	Ireland	William Porterfield	Scotland	Kyle Coetzer	Dubai International Cricket Stadium, Dubai	Ireland by 98 runs
T20I 588	20 January	Afghanistan	Nawroz Mangal	Ireland	William Porterfield	Dubai International Cricket Stadium, Dubai	Afghanistan by 10 wickets

=== 2016–17 United Arab Emirates Tri-Nation Series ===
Pos	Team	Pld	W	L	T	NR	BP	Pts	NRR
1	United Arab Emirates	2	2	0	0	0	0	4	0.892
2	Hong Kong	2	1	1	0	0	0	2	−0.282
3	Scotland	2	0	2	0	0	0	0	−0.630

Source: ESPNcricinfo

No.	Date	Team 1	Captain 1	Team 2	Captain 2	Venue	Result
ODI 3823	22 January	Hong Kong	Babar Hayat	Scotland	Kyle Coetzer	Sheikh Zayed Cricket Stadium, Abu Dhabi	Hong Kong by 7 wickets
ODI 3825	24 January	United Arab Emirates	Rohan Mustafa	Scotland	Kyle Coetzer	Dubai International Cricket Stadium, Dubai	United Arab Emirates by 4 wickets
ODI 3827	26 January	United Arab Emirates	Rohan Mustafa	Hong Kong	Babar Hayat	Dubai International Cricket Stadium, Dubai	United Arab Emirates by 6 wickets

=== Australia in New Zealand ===
2017 Chappell–Hadlee Trophy - ODI series
No.	Date	Home captain	Away captain	Venue	Result
ODI 3829	30 January	Kane Williamson	Aaron Finch	Eden Park, Auckland	New Zealand by 6 runs
ODI 3830a	2 February	Kane Williamson	Aaron Finch	McLean Park, Napier	Match abandoned
ODI 3832	5 February	Kane Williamson	Aaron Finch	Seddon Park, Hamilton	New Zealand by 24 runs

== February ==
=== 2017 Women's Cricket World Cup Qualifier ===
Pos	Team	Pld	W	L	T	NR	Pts	NRR
1	India	4	4	0	0	0	8	3.245
2	Sri Lanka	4	3	1	0	0	6	0.733
3	Ireland	4	2	2	0	0	4	−0.530
4	Zimbabwe	4	1	3	0	0	2	−1.565
5	Thailand	4	0	4	0	0	0	−1.491

Qualified to Super Six stage

Pos	Team	Pld	W	L	T	NR	Pts	NRR
1	South Africa	4	4	0	0	0	8	2.168
2	Pakistan	4	3	1	0	0	6	1.725
3	Bangladesh	4	2	2	0	0	4	0.074
4	Scotland	4	1	3	0	0	2	−0.956
5	Papua New Guinea	4	0	4	0	0	0	−2.623

Qualified to Super Six stage

Group stage
No.	Date	Team 1	Captain 1	Team 2	Captain 2	Venue	Result
1st Match	7 February	Sri Lanka	Inoka Ranaweera	India	Mithali Raj	P. Sara Oval, Colombo	India by 114 runs
2nd Match	7 February	Ireland	Laura Delany	Zimbabwe	Sharne Mayers	Mercantile Cricket Association Ground, Colombo	Ireland by 119 runs
3rd Match	7 February	South Africa	Dane van Niekerk	Pakistan	Sana Mir	Nondescripts Cricket Club Ground, Colombo	South Africa by 63 runs
4th Match	7 February	Bangladesh	Rumana Ahmed	Papua New Guinea	Pauke Siaka	Colombo Cricket Club Ground, Colombo	Bangladesh by 118 runs
5th Match	8 February	Sri Lanka	Inoka Ranaweera	Ireland	Laura Delany	Nondescripts Cricket Club Ground, Colombo	Sri Lanka by 146 runs
6th Match	8 February	India	Mithali Raj	Thailand	Sornnarin Tippoch	Colombo Cricket Club Ground, Colombo	India by 9 wickets
7th Match	8 February	Scotland	Abbi Aitken	South Africa	Dane van Niekerk	Mercantile Cricket Association Ground, Colombo	South Africa by 6 wickets
8th Match	8 February	Pakistan	Sana Mir	Bangladesh	Rumana Ahmed	P. Sara Oval, Colombo	Pakistan by 67 runs
9th Match	10 February	Papua New Guinea	Pauke Siaka	Pakistan	Sana Mir	Nondescripts Cricket Club Ground, Colombo	Pakistan by 236 runs
10th Match	10 February	Bangladesh	Rumana Ahmed	Scotland	Abbi Aitken	Colombo Cricket Club Ground, Colombo	Bangladesh by 7 wickets
11th Match	10 February	India	Mithali Raj	Ireland	Laura Delany	P. Sara Oval, Colombo	India by 125 runs
12th Match	10 February	Thailand	Sornnarin Tippoch	Zimbabwe	Sharne Mayers	Mercantile Cricket Association Ground, Colombo	Zimbabwe by 36 runs
13th Match	11 February	South Africa	Dane van Niekerk	Bangladesh	Rumana Ahmed	P. Sara Oval, Colombo	South Africa by 6 wickets
14th Match	11 February	Scotland	Abbi Aitken	Papua New Guinea	Pauke Siaka	Mercantile Cricket Association Ground, Colombo	Scotland by 7 runs
15th Match	11 February	Sri Lanka	Inoka Ranaweera	Zimbabwe	Sharne Mayers	Nondescripts Cricket Club Ground, Colombo	Sri Lanka by 8 wickets
16th Match	11 February	Ireland	Laura Delany	Thailand	Sornnarin Tippoch	Colombo Cricket Club Ground, Colombo	Ireland by 46 runs
17th Match	13 February	Zimbabwe	Sharne Mayers	India	Mithali Raj	P. Sara Oval, Colombo	India by 9 wickets
18th Match	13 February	Sri Lanka	Inoka Ranaweera	Thailand	Sornnarin Tippoch	Mercantile Cricket Association Ground, Colombo	Sri Lanka won by 7 wickets
19th Match	13 February	South Africa	Dane van Niekerk	Papua New Guinea	Pauke Siaka	Nondescripts Cricket Club Ground, Colombo	South Africa by 10 wickets
20th Match	13 February	Pakistan	Sana Mir	Scotland	Abbi Aitken	Colombo Cricket Club Ground, Colombo	Pakistan by 6 wickets

Pos	Team	Pld	W	L	T	NR	Pts	NRR
1	India	5	5	0	0	0	10	1.981
2	South Africa	5	4	1	0	0	8	0.953
3	Sri Lanka	5	3	2	0	0	6	0.146
4	Pakistan	5	2	3	0	0	4	−0.150
5	Bangladesh	5	1	4	0	0	2	−1.127
6	Ireland	5	0	5	0	0	0	−2.013

Qualified to 2017 Women's Cricket World Cup
Retained ODI status until 2021.

Super Six stage
No.	Date	Team 1	Captain 1	Team 2	Captain 2	Venue	Result
21st Match	15 February	India	Mithali Raj	South Africa	Dane van Niekerk	P. Sara Oval, Colombo	India by 49 runs
22nd Match	15 February	Sri Lanka	Inoka Ranaweera	Pakistan	Sana Mir	Nondescripts Cricket Club Ground, Colombo	Sri Lanka by 5 wickets
23rd Match	15 February	Bangladesh	Rumana Ahmed	Ireland	Laura Delany	Colombo Cricket Club Ground, Colombo	Bangladesh by 7 wickets
24th Match	17 February	Sri Lanka	Inoka Ranaweera	South Africa	Dane van Niekerk	P. Sara Oval, Colombo	South Africa by 9 wickets
25th Match	17 February	Bangladesh	Rumana Ahmed	India	Mithali Raj	Nondescripts Cricket Club Ground, Colombo	India by 9 wickets
26th Match	17 February	Ireland	Laura Delany	Pakistan	Sana Mir	Colombo Cricket Club Ground, Colombo	Pakistan by 86 runs
27th Match	19 February	India	Mithali Raj	Pakistan	Sana Mir	P. Sara Oval, Colombo	India by 7 wickets
28th Match	19 February	Sri Lanka	Inoka Ranaweera	Bangladesh	Rumana Ahmed	Nondescripts Cricket Club Ground, Colombo	Sri Lanka by 42 runs (DLS)
29th Match	19 February	Ireland	Laura Delany	South Africa	Dane van Niekerk	Colombo Cricket Club Ground, Colombo	South Africa by 35 runs (DLS)
Final
30th Match	21 February	India	Harmanpreet Kaur	South Africa	Dane van Niekerk	P. Sara Oval, Colombo	India by 1 wicket

=== Bangladesh in India ===
Test series
No.	Date	Home captain	Away captain	Venue	Result
Test 2249	9–13 February	Virat Kohli	Mushfiqur Rahim	Rajiv Gandhi International Cricket Stadium, Hyderabad	India by 208 runs

=== Netherlands in Hong Kong ===
2015–17 ICC Intercontinental Cup - FC series
No.	Date	Home captain	Away captain	Venue	Result
First-class	10–13 February	Babar Hayat	Peter Borren	Mission Road Ground, Mong Kok	Match drawn
2015–17 ICC World Cricket League Championship - List A series
No.	Date	Home captain	Away captain	Venue	Result
List A	16 February	Babar Hayat	Peter Borren	Mission Road Ground, Mong Kok	Netherlands by 5 runs
List A	18 February	Babar Hayat	Peter Borren	Mission Road Ground, Mong Kok	Netherlands by 13 runs

=== Afghanistan in Zimbabwe ===
ODI series
No.	Date	Home captain	Away captain	Venue	Result
ODI 3835	16 February	Graeme Cremer	Asghar Stanikzai	Harare Sports Club, Harare	Afghanistan by 12 runs (DLS)
ODI 3837	19 February	Graeme Cremer	Asghar Stanikzai	Harare Sports Club, Harare	Afghanistan by 54 runs
ODI 3838	21 February	Graeme Cremer	Asghar Stanikzai	Harare Sports Club, Harare	Zimbabwe by 3 runs
ODI 3840	24 February	Graeme Cremer	Asghar Stanikzai	Harare Sports Club, Harare	Zimbabwe by 7 wickets (DLS)
ODI 3842	26 February	Graeme Cremer	Asghar Stanikzai	Harare Sports Club, Harare	Afghanistan by 106 runs (DLS)

=== South Africa in New Zealand ===
T20I series
No.	Date	Home captain	Away captain	Venue	Result
T20I 595	17 February	Kane Williamson	Faf du Plessis	Eden Park, Auckland	South Africa by 78 runs
ODI series
No.	Date	Home captain	Away captain	Venue	Result
ODI 3836	19 February	Kane Williamson	AB de Villiers	Seddon Park, Hamilton	South Africa by 4 wickets
ODI 3839	22 February	Kane Williamson	AB de Villiers	Hagley Oval, Christchurch	New Zealand by 6 runs
ODI 3841	25 February	Kane Williamson	AB de Villiers	Wellington Regional Stadium, Wellington	South Africa by 159 runs
ODI 3843	1 March	Kane Williamson	AB de Villiers	Seddon Park, Hamilton	New Zealand by 7 wickets
ODI 3846	4 March	Kane Williamson	AB de Villiers	Eden Park, Auckland	South Africa by 6 wickets
Test series
No.	Date	Home captain	Away captain	Venue	Result
Test 2253	8–12 March	Kane Williamson	Faf du Plessis	University Oval, Dunedin	Match drawn
Test 2255	16–20 March	Kane Williamson	Faf du Plessis	Basin Reserve, Wellington	South Africa by 8 wickets
Test 2257	25–29 March	Kane Williamson	Faf du Plessis	Seddon Park, Hamilton	Match drawn

=== Sri Lanka in Australia ===
T20I series
No.	Date	Home captain	Away captain	Venue	Result
T20I 596	17 February	Aaron Finch	Upul Tharanga	Melbourne Cricket Ground, Melbourne	Sri Lanka by 5 wickets
T20I 597	19 February	Aaron Finch	Upul Tharanga	Kardinia Park, Geelong	Sri Lanka by 2 wickets
T20I 598	22 February	Aaron Finch	Upul Tharanga	Adelaide Oval, Adelaide	Australia by 41 runs

=== New Zealand women in Australia ===
WT20I series
No.	Date	Home captain	Away captain	Venue	Result
WT20I 381	17 February	Meg Lanning	Suzie Bates	Melbourne Cricket Ground, Melbourne	Australia by 40 runs
WT20I 382	19 February	Meg Lanning	Suzie Bates	Kardinia Park, Geelong	New Zealand by 8 runs (DLS)
WT20I 383	22 February	Meg Lanning	Suzie Bates	Adelaide Oval, Adelaide	New Zealand by 47 runs

=== Australia in India ===
2016-17 Border–Gavaskar Trophy - Test series
No.	Date	Home captain	Away captain	Venue	Result
Test 2250	23–27 February	Virat Kohli	Steve Smith	Maharashtra Cricket Association Stadium, Pune	Australia by 333 runs
Test 2251	4–8 March	Virat Kohli	Steve Smith	M. Chinnaswamy Stadium, Bangalore	India by 75 runs
Test 2256	16–20 March	Virat Kohli	Steve Smith	JSCA International Stadium Complex, Ranchi	Match drawn
Test 2258	25–29 March	Ajinkya Rahane	Steve Smith	Himachal Pradesh Cricket Association Stadium, Dharamshala	India by 8 wickets

=== Australia women in New Zealand ===
WODI series
No.	Date	Home captain	Away captain	Venue	Result
WODI 1046	26 February	Suzie Bates	Meg Lanning	Eden Park No 2, Auckland	New Zealand by 5 wickets
WODI 1047	2 March	Suzie Bates	Meg Lanning	Bay Oval, Mount Maunganui	Australia by 4 wickets
WODI 1048	5 March	Suzie Bates	Meg Lanning	Bay Oval, Mount Maunganui	Australia by 5 wickets

== March ==
=== Ireland in United Arab Emirates ===
ODI series
No.	Date	Home captain	Away captain	Venue	Result
ODI 3844	2 March	Rohan Mustafa	William Porterfield	ICC Academy Ground, Dubai	Ireland by 85 runs
ODI 3847	4 March	Rohan Mustafa	William Porterfield	ICC Academy Ground, Dubai	Ireland by 8 wickets

=== England in West Indies ===
ODI series
No.	Date	Home captain	Away captain	Venue	Result
ODI 3845	3 March	Jason Holder	Eoin Morgan	Sir Vivian Richards Stadium, North Sound	England by 45 runs
ODI 3848	5 March	Jason Holder	Eoin Morgan	Sir Vivian Richards Stadium, North Sound	England by 4 wickets
ODI 3849	9 March	Jason Holder	Eoin Morgan	Kensington Oval, Bridgetown	England by 186 runs

=== Ireland vs. Afghanistan in India ===
T20I series
No.	Date	Home captain	Away captain	Venue	Result
T20I 599	8 March	Asghar Stanikzai	William Porterfield	Greater Noida Sports Complex Ground, Greater Noida	Afghanistan by 6 wickets
T20I 600	10 March	Asghar Stanikzai	William Porterfield	Greater Noida Sports Complex Ground, Greater Noida	Afghanistan by 17 runs (DLS)
T20I 601	12 March	Asghar Stanikzai	William Porterfield	Greater Noida Sports Complex Ground, Greater Noida	Afghanistan by 28 runs
ODI series
No.	Date	Home captain	Away captain	Venue	Result
ODI 3850	15 March	Asghar Stanikzai	William Porterfield	Greater Noida Sports Complex Ground, Greater Noida	Afghanistan by 30 runs
ODI 3851	17 March	Asghar Stanikzai	William Porterfield	Greater Noida Sports Complex Ground, Greater Noida	Afghanistan by 34 runs
ODI 3852	19 March	Asghar Stanikzai	William Porterfield	Greater Noida Sports Complex Ground, Greater Noida	Ireland by 6 wickets
ODI 3853	22 March	Asghar Stanikzai	William Porterfield	Greater Noida Sports Complex Ground, Greater Noida	Ireland by 3 wickets
ODI 3854	24 March	Asghar Stanikzai	William Porterfield	Greater Noida Sports Complex Ground, Greater Noida	Afghanistan by 7 wickets
2015–17 ICC Intercontinental Cup - FC series
No.	Date	Home captain	Away captain	Venue	Result
First-class	28–31 March	Asghar Stanikzai	William Porterfield	Greater Noida Sports Complex Ground, Greater Noida	Afghanistan by an innings and 172 runs

=== Kenya in Nepal ===
2015–17 ICC World Cricket League Championship - List A series
No.	Date	Home captain	Away captain	Venue	Result
1st List A	11 March	Gyanendra Malla	Rakep Patel	Tribhuvan University International Cricket Ground, Kirtipur	Kenya by 5 wickets (DLS)
2nd List A	13 March	Gyanendra Malla	Rakep Patel	Tribhuvan University International Cricket Ground, Kirtipur	Nepal by 7 wickets

=== Bangladesh in Sri Lanka ===
Test series
No.	Date	Home captain	Away captain	Venue	Result
Test 2252	7–11 March	Rangana Herath	Mushfiqur Rahim	Galle International Stadium, Galle	Sri Lanka by 259 runs
Test 2254	15–19 March	Rangana Herath	Mushfiqur Rahim	P. Sara Oval, Colombo	Bangladesh by 4 wickets
ODI series
No.	Date	Home captain	Away captain	Venue	Result
ODI 3855	25 March	Upul Tharanga	Mashrafe Mortaza	Rangiri Dambulla International Stadium, Dambulla	Bangladesh by 90 runs
ODI 3856	28 March	Upul Tharanga	Mashrafe Mortaza	Rangiri Dambulla International Stadium, Dambulla	No result
ODI 3858	1 April	Upul Tharanga	Mashrafe Mortaza	Sinhalese Sports Club Ground, Colombo	Sri Lanka by 70 runs
T20I series
No.	Date	Home captain	Away captain	Venue	Result
T20I 606	4 April	Upul Tharanga	Mashrafe Mortaza	R. Premadasa Stadium, Colombo	Sri Lanka by 6 wickets
T20I 607	6 April	Upul Tharanga	Mashrafe Mortaza	R. Premadasa Stadium, Colombo	Bangladesh by 45 runs

=== Pakistan in West Indies ===
T20I series
No.	Date	Home captain	Away captain	Venue	Result
T20I 602	26 March	Carlos Brathwaite	Sarfaraz Ahmed	Kensington Oval, Bridgetown, Barbados	Pakistan by 6 wickets
T20I 603	30 March	Carlos Brathwaite	Sarfaraz Ahmed	Queen's Park Oval, Port of Spain, Trinidad and Tobago	Pakistan by 3 runs
T20I 604	1 April	Carlos Brathwaite	Sarfaraz Ahmed	Queen's Park Oval, Port of Spain, Trinidad and Tobago	West Indies by 7 wickets
T20I 605	2 April	Carlos Brathwaite	Sarfaraz Ahmed	Queen's Park Oval, Port of Spain, Trinidad and Tobago	Pakistan by 7 wickets
ODI series
No.	Date	Home captain	Away captain	Venue	Result
ODI 3861	7 April	Jason Holder	Sarfaraz Ahmed	Providence Stadium, Providence, Guyana	West Indies by 4 wickets
ODI 3862	9 April	Jason Holder	Sarfaraz Ahmed	Providence Stadium, Providence, Guyana	Pakistan by 74 runs
ODI 3863	11 April	Jason Holder	Sarfaraz Ahmed	Providence Stadium, Providence, Guyana	Pakistan by 6 wickets
Test series
No.	Date	Home captain	Away captain	Venue	Result
Test 2259	21–25 April	Jason Holder	Misbah-ul-Haq	Sabina Park, Kingston, Jamaica	Pakistan by 7 wickets
Test 2260	30 April–4 May	Jason Holder	Misbah-ul-Haq	Kensington Oval, Bridgetown, Barbados	West Indies by 106 runs
Test 2261	10–14 May	Jason Holder	Misbah-ul-Haq	Windsor Park, Roseau, Dominica	Pakistan by 101 runs

=== Papua New Guinea in United Arab Emirates ===
2015–17 ICC World Cricket League Championship and ODI series
No.	Date	Home captain	Away captain	Venue	Result
ODI 3857	31 March	Rohan Mustafa	Assad Vala	Sheikh Zayed Cricket Stadium, Abu Dhabi	United Arab Emirates by 82 runs
ODI 3859	2 April	Rohan Mustafa	Assad Vala	Sheikh Zayed Cricket Stadium, Abu Dhabi	Papua New Guinea by 26 runs
ODI 3860	4 April	Rohan Mustafa	Assad Vala	Sheikh Zayed Cricket Stadium, Abu Dhabi	United Arab Emirates by 103 runs
2015–17 ICC Intercontinental Cup - FC series
No.	Date	Home captain	Away captain	Venue	Result
First-class	7–10 April	Rohan Mustafa	Assad Vala	Sheikh Zayed Cricket Stadium, Abu Dhabi	United Arab Emirates by 9 wickets
T20I series
No.	Date	Home captain	Away captain	Venue	Result
T20I 608	12 April	Rohan Mustafa	Assad Vala	Sheikh Zayed Cricket Stadium, Abu Dhabi	United Arab Emirates by 5 wickets
T20I 609	14 April	Rohan Mustafa	Assad Vala	Sheikh Zayed Cricket Stadium, Abu Dhabi	United Arab Emirates by 30 runs
T20I 610	14 April	Rohan Mustafa	Assad Vala	Sheikh Zayed Cricket Stadium, Abu Dhabi	United Arab Emirates by 5 wickets
