= 2017 Desert T20 Challenge =

International cricket tournament

- Dates: 14 – 20 January 2017
- Administrator: ICC
- Cricket format: Twenty20 International; Twenty20
- Tournament format(s): Round-robin, finals
- Host: UAE
- Champions: Afghanistan
- Participants: 8
- Matches: 15
- Player of the series: (Afghanistan) Mohammad Nabi
- Most runs: (Afghanistan) Mohammad Shahzad (207)
- Most wickets: (Ireland) Jacob Mulder (10)

The 2017 Desert T20 Challenge was an international Twenty20 International (T20I) cricket tournament that was held in Dubai and Abu Dhabi from 14 to 20 January 2017. The eight Associate Members of the International Cricket Council that have T20I status were scheduled to take part. However, Papua New Guinea declined to participate and were replaced by Namibia (who did not have T20I status at the time). Therefore, matches with Namibia were played as Twenty20 matches.

The fixtures for the tournament were confirmed by the Emirates Cricket Board (ECB) in December 2016. The eight teams were split into two groups of four teams, with Afghanistan, Ireland, Namibia and the United Arab Emirates in Group A and Netherlands, Scotland, Oman and Hong Kong in Group B. The semi-finals and final of the tournament took place at the Dubai International Cricket Stadium on 20 January.

Afghanistan and Ireland qualified from Group A and Scotland and Oman qualified from Group B for the finals stage of the tournament. Afghanistan beat Ireland by 10 wickets in the final match to win the tournament.

== Teams ==
- Afghanistan
- Hong Kong
- Ireland
- Namibia
- Netherlands
- Oman
- Scotland
- United Arab Emirates

== Squads ==
Afghanistan Coach: Lalchand Rajput	Hong Kong Coach: Simon Cook	Ireland Coach: John Bracewell	Namibia Coach: Dee Thakur
Asghar Stanikzai (c); Fareed Ahmad; Amir Hamza; Karim Janat; Rashid Khan; Nawroz Mangal; Mohammad Nabi; Gulbadin Naib; Naveen-ul-Haq; Mohammad Shahzad; Samiullah Shinwari; Najeeb Tarakai; Dawlat Zadran; Najibullah Zadran	Babar Hayat (c); Nadeem Ahmed; Tanveer Ahmed; Waqas Barkat; Christopher Carter; Kyle Christie; Aizaz Khan; Ehsan Khan; Nizakat Khan; Waqas Khan; Cameron McAuslan; Ehsan Nawaz; Anshuman Rath; Shahid Wasif	William Porterfield (c); ~~Andrew Balbirnie~~; George Dockrell; Josh Little; Jacob Mulder; Andrew McBrine; Barry McCarthy; Kevin O'Brien; Stuart Poynter; Boyd Rankin; Paul Stirling; Greg Thompson; ~~Stuart Thompson~~; Lorcan Tucker; Gary Wilson; Craig Young	Sarel Burger (c); Stephan Baard; Christopher Coombe; Gerhard Erasmus; Jan Frylinck; Zane Green; Jean-Pierre Kotze; Mika Mutumbe; Colin Peake; Bernard Scholtz; JJ Smit; Gerrie Snyman; Louis van der Westhuizen; Craig Williams
Netherlands Coach: Chris Adams	Oman Coach: Duleep Mendis	Scotland Coach: Grant Bradburn	United Arab Emirates Coach: Owais Shah
Peter Borren (c); Wesley Barresi; Ben Cooper; Vivian Kingma; Ahsan Malik; Stephan Myburgh; Max O'Dowd; Michael Rippon; Pieter Seelaar; Timm van der Gugten; Roelof van der Merwe; Paul van Meekeren; Tobias Visee; Sikander Zulfiqar	Sultan Ahmed (c); Khawar Ali; Aqib Ilyas; Kaleemullah; Bilal Khan; Mehran Khan; Naseem Khushi; Ajay Lalcheta; Sufyan Mahmood; Zeeshan Maqsood; Mohammad Nadeem; Khurram Nawaz; Arun Poulose; Rajesh Ranpura	Kyle Coetzer (c); Richie Berrington; Matthew Cross; Josh Davey; Con de Lange (vc); Michael Leask; Calum MacLeod; George Munsey; Safyaan Sharif; Chris Sole; Craig Wallace; Mark Watt; Brad Wheal	Amjad Javed (c); Shaiman Anwar; Imran Haider; Zahoor Khan; Rohan Mustafa; Adnan Mufti; Mohammad Naveed; Mohammed Qasim; Ahmed Raza; Ghulam Shabber; Mohammad Shahzad; Rameez Shahzad; Muhammed Shanil; Muhammad Usman

Before the tournament started, both Andrew Balbirnie and Stuart Thompson were ruled out of Ireland's squad due to injury. They were replaced by Stuart Poynter and Lorcan Tucker respectively.

== Fixtures ==
=== Group A ===
Pos	Team	Pld	W	L	NR	Pts	NRR
1	Afghanistan	3	3	0	0	6	1.419
2	Ireland	3	2	1	0	4	0.319
3	United Arab Emirates	3	1	2	0	2	−0.552
4	Namibia	3	0	3	0	0	−1.177

Qualified to Finals

14 January 2017
19.00 (D/N)
Scorecard

Ireland; 125/6 (20 overs)	v	Afghanistan; 126/5 (18.4 overs)
Paul Stirling 25 (24); Amir Hamza 2/21 (4 overs)		Najeeb Tarakai 31 (31); Jacob Mulder 2/23 (4 overs)

Afghanistan won by 5 wickets
Sheikh Zayed Cricket Stadium, Abu Dhabi
Umpires: Iftikhar Ali (UAE) and Buddhi Pradhan (Nep)
Player of the match: Mohammad Nabi (Afg)

- Ireland won the toss and elected to bat.

15 January 2017
19.00 (D/N)
Scorecard

Namibia; 152/7 (20 overs)	v	United Arab Emirates; 153/4 (20 overs)
Jean-Pierre Kotze 50 (42); Mohammad Naveed 3/35 (4 overs)		Rohan Mustafa 56 (34); Jan Frylinck 1/34 (4 overs)

United Arab Emirates won by 6 wickets
Sheikh Zayed Cricket Stadium, Abu Dhabi
Umpires: Ahmed Shah Durrani (Afg) and Buddhi Pradhan (Nep)
Player of the match: Mohammad Naveed (UAE)

- Namibia won the toss and elected to bat.
- Colin Peake (Namibia) made his T20 debut.

16 January 2017
19.00 (D/N)
Scorecard

United Arab Emirates; 146/7 (20 overs)	v	Afghanistan; 147/5 (18.5 overs)
Shaiman Anwar 52 (52); Dawlat Zadran 4/44 (4 overs)		Samiullah Shinwari 42 (44); Ahmed Raza 2/18 (4 overs)

Afghanistan won by 5 wickets
Sheikh Zayed Cricket Stadium, Abu Dhabi
Umpires: Alex Dowdalls (Sco) and Tabarak Dar (HK)
Player of the match: Dawlat Zadran (Afg)

- Afghanistan won the toss and elected to field.
- Zahoor Khan (UAE) made his T20I debut.

17 January 2017
14.00
Scorecard

Namibia; 146/9 (20 overs)	v	Ireland; 149/5 (19.4 overs)
Louis van der Westhuizen 50 (25); Josh Little 2/17 (3 overs)		Stuart Poynter 38 (26); Sarel Burger 1/18 (2 overs)

Ireland won by 5 wickets
Sheikh Zayed Cricket Stadium, Abu Dhabi
Umpires: Iftikhar Ali (UAE) and Buddhi Pradhan (Nep)
Player of the match: Kevin O'Brien (Ire)

- Namibia won the toss and elected to bat.

18 January 2017
14.00
Scorecard

Ireland; 160/6 (20 overs)	v	United Arab Emirates; 136/7 (20 overs)
Kevin O'Brien 40 (27); Amjad Javed 2/16 (4 overs)		Amjad Javed 47* (46); Boyd Rankin 3/16 (3 overs)

Ireland won by 24 runs
Dubai International Cricket Stadium, Dubai
Umpires: Ahmed Shah Durrani (Afg) and Buddhi Pradhan (Nep)
Player of the match: Boyd Rankin (Ire)

- Ireland won the toss and elected to bat.

19 January 2017
14.00
Scorecard

Afghanistan; 167/6 (20 overs)	v	Namibia; 103 (19.2 overs)
Samiullah Shinwari 35 (19); Bernard Scholtz 3/17 (4 overs)		Jan Frylinck 28 (21); Rashid Khan 3/4 (2.2 overs)

Afghanistan won by 64 runs
Dubai International Cricket Stadium, Dubai
Umpires: Alex Dowdalls (Sco) and Tabarak Dar (HK)
Player of the match: Rashid Khan (Afg)

- Afghanistan won the toss and elected to bat.
- Naveen-ul-Haq (Afg) made his T20 debut.

=== Group B ===
Pos	Team	Pld	W	L	NR	Pts	NRR
1	Scotland	3	3	0	0	6	0.666
2	Oman	3	1	2	0	2	0.890
3	Hong Kong	3	1	2	0	2	−0.005
4	Netherlands	3	1	2	0	2	−1.529

Qualified to Finals

14 January 2017
14.00
Scorecard

Scotland; 189/3 (20 overs)	v	Hong Kong; 165/6 (20 overs)
Calum MacLeod 60 (34); Ehsan Khan 2/26 (4 overs)		Ehsan Khan 42* (22); Mark Watt 1/20 (4 overs)

Scotland won by 24 runs
Sheikh Zayed Cricket Stadium, Abu Dhabi
Umpires: Ahmed Shah Pakteen (Afg) and Alan Neill (Ire)
Player of the match: Calum MacLeod (Sco)

- Scotland won the toss and elected to bat.
- Ahmed Shah Pakteen (Afg) stood in his first T20I as an umpire.
- Richie Berrington and Calum MacLeods' third-wicket partnership of 127 runs was Scotland's highest partnership for any wicket in T20Is.

15 January 2017
14.00
Scorecard

Oman; 146/7 (20 overs)	v	Netherlands; 148/5 (19.2 overs)
Zeeshan Maqsood 34 (31); Michael Rippon 1/15 (4 overs)		Wesley Barresi 48 (50); Naseem Khushi 2/24 (4 overs)

Netherlands won by 5 wickets
Sheikh Zayed Cricket Stadium, Abu Dhabi
Umpires: Alex Dowdalls (Sco) and Tabarak Dar (HK)
Player of the match: Michael Rippon (Ned)

- Oman won the toss and elected to bat.
- Alex Dowdalls (Sco) stood in his first T20I as an umpire.
- Aqib Ilyas, Kaleemullah, Khurram Nawaz, Naseem Khushi and Arun Poulose (Oman) all made their T20I debuts.

16 January 2017
14.00
Scorecard

Hong Kong; 87 (18.3 overs)	v	Oman; 89/3 (11 overs)
Aizaz Khan 19 (14); Bilal Khan 3/18 (4 overs)		Aqib Ilyas 56* (30); Aizaz Khan 1/18 (3 overs)

Oman won by 7 wickets
Sheikh Zayed Cricket Stadium, Abu Dhabi
Umpires: Iftikhar Ali (UAE) and Alan Neill (Ire)
Player of the match: Bilal Khan (Oman)

- Oman won the toss and elected to field.

17 January 2017
19.00 (D/N)
Scorecard

Scotland; 148/7 (20 overs)	v	Netherlands; 141 (19.2 overs)
Richie Berrington 38 (30); Roelof van der Merwe 2/26 (4 overs)		Michael Rippon 42 (40); Josh Davey 4/34 (4 overs)

Scotland won by 7 runs
Sheikh Zayed Cricket Stadium, Abu Dhabi
Umpires: Alan Neill (Ire) and Tabarak Dar (HK)
Player of the match: Josh Davey (Sco)

- Netherlands won the toss and elected to field.

18 January 2017
19.00 (D/N)
Scorecard

Hong Kong; 183/4 (20 overs)	v	Netherlands; 92 (15.3 overs)
Nizakat Khan 59 (33); Max O'Dowd 1/15 (2 overs)		Ben Cooper 22 (19); Anshuman Rath 3/6 (2 overs)

Hong Kong won by 91 runs
Dubai International Cricket Stadium, Dubai
Umpires: Alex Dowdalls (Sco) and Alan Neill (Ire)
Player of the match: Anshuman Rath (HK)

- Hong Kong won the toss and elected to bat.

19 January 2017
19.00 (D/N)
Scorecard

Oman; 133 (20 overs)	v	Scotland; 134/3 (19 overs)
Khurram Nawaz 23 (25); Safyaan Sharif 3/33 (4 overs)		Matthew Cross 47 (40); Zeeshan Maqsood 1/22 (4 overs)

Scotland won by 7 wickets
Dubai International Cricket Stadium, Dubai
Umpires: Ahmed Shah Pakteen (Afg) and Iftikhar Ali (UAE)
Player of the match: Matthew Cross (Sco)

- Oman won the toss and elected to bat.
- Chris Sole (Sco) made his T20I debut.

== Finals ==
1st Semi-Final
20 January 2017
10.00
Scorecard

Oman; 149/8 (20 overs)	v	Afghanistan; 150/2 (18.3 overs)
Zeeshan Maqsood 33 (36); Fareed Ahmad 3/35 (4 overs)		Mohammad Shahzad 80 (60); Khawar Ali 1/32 (3 overs)

Afghanistan won by 8 wickets
Dubai International Cricket Stadium, Dubai
Umpires: Alex Dowdalls (Sco) and Alan Neill (Ire)
Player of the match: Mohammad Shahzad (Afg)

- Afghanistan won the toss and elected to field.

2nd Semi-Final
20 January 2017
14.30
Scorecard

Ireland; 211/6 (20 overs)	v	Scotland; 113 (15.1 overs)
Gary Wilson 65* (29); Con de Lange 2/37 (4 overs)		Kyle Coetzer 40 (31); Jacob Mulder 4/16 (4 overs)

Ireland won by 98 runs
Dubai International Cricket Stadium, Dubai
Umpires: Ahmed Shah Pakteen (Afg) and Buddhi Pradhan (Nep)
Player of the match: Gary Wilson (Ire)

- Scotland won the toss and elected to field.

Final
20 January 2017
19.30 (D/N)
Scorecard

Ireland; 71 (13.2 overs)	v	Afghanistan; 75/0 (7.5 overs)
Paul Stirling 17 (18); Mohammad Nabi 4/10 (2.2 overs)		Mohammad Shahzad 52* (40)

Afghanistan won by 10 wickets
Dubai International Cricket Stadium, Dubai
Umpires: Buddhi Pradhan (Nep) and Tabarak Dar (HK)
Player of the match: Mohammad Nabi (Afg)

- Ireland won the toss and elected to bat.
- Nawroz Mangal captained Afghanistan in his final match, with the regular captain Asghar Stanikzai also playing in the match.
- Mohammad Shahzad (Afg) became first person to score two half-centuries in two separate international matches on the same day.

== Statistics ==
=== Most runs ===
Player	Matches	Innings	Runs	Average	SR	HS	100	50	4s	6s
(Afghanistan) Mohammad Shahzad	5	5	207	51.75	121.76	80	0	2	26	6
(Ireland) Gary Wilson	5	5	155	51.66	156.56	65*	0	1	15	5
(Ireland) Paul Stirling	5	5	152	30.40	128.81	60	0	1	16	5
(Scotland) Calum MacLeod	4	4	117	39.00	131.46	60	0	1	8	4
(United Arab Emirates) Shaiman Anwar	3	3	110	36.66	100.00	66*	0	2	9	2
Source: ESPN Cricinfo

=== Most wickets ===
Player	Matches	Innings	Wickets	Overs	Econ.	Ave.	BBI	S/R	4WI	5WI
(Ireland) Jacob Mulder	5	5	10	18	5.66	10.20	4/16	10.80	1	0
(Afghanistan) Rashid Khan	5	5	9	16.2	3.61	6.55	3/4	10.80	0	0
(Afghanistan) Amir Hamza	4	4	7	16	4.81	11.00	2/15	13.70	0	0
(Afghanistan) Mohammad Nabi	5	5	7	16.2	5.69	13.28	4/10	14.00	1	0
(Oman) Bilal Khan	4	4	7	13.5	8.45	16.71	3/18	11.80	0	0
Source: ESPN Cricinfo

== See also ==
- ICC World Twenty20 Qualifier
