= Omani cricket team in the United Arab Emirates in 2016–17 =

International cricket tour

Omani cricket team against the United Arab Emirates in 2016–17
	United Arab Emirates	Oman
- Dates: 13 – 17 October 2016
Captains	Muhammed Shanil	Ajay Lalcheta

The Oman cricket team toured the United Arab Emirates in October 2016 to play three List A cricket matches against the home team. Former England cricketer Owais Shah was the coaching consultant for the UAE during the tournament, and was given a three-month contract following the conclusion of the fixtures.

The United Arab Emirates won the three-match series 2–1.

== Squads ==
United Arab Emirates	Oman
Muhammed Shanil (c); Shaiman Anwar; Imran Haider; Amjad Javed; Rohan Mustafa; Mohammad Naveed; Mohammed Qasim; Ahmed Raza; Ghulam Shabber; Chirag Suri; Muhammad Usman	Ajay Lalcheta (c); Khawar Ali; Munis Ansari; Swapnil Khadye; Zeeshan Maqsood; Sufyan Mehmood; Arun Poulose; Rajeshkumar Ranpura; Zeeshan Siddiqui; Jatinder Singh; Vaibhav Wategaonkar

== List A series ==
=== 1st List A ===
13 October 2016
Scorecard

United Arab Emirates; 214 (49.4 overs)	v	Oman; 174 (43.4 overs)
Ghulam Shabber 66 (87); Khawar Ali 4/36 (10 overs)		Zeeshan Maqsood 70 (81); Muhammed Shanil 2/18 (6 overs)

United Arab Emirates won by 40 runs
ICC Global Cricket Academy, Dubai
Umpires: Razzaq Shah (UAE) and Shiju Sam (UAE)

- Oman won the toss and elected to field.
- Munis Ansari, Jatinder Singh, Swapnil Khadye, Khawar Ali, Ajay Lalcheta, Rajeshkumar Ranpura, Sufyan Mehmood and Zeeshan Maqsood (Oman); Muhammed Shanil, Ghulam Shabber, Imran Haider and Mohammed Qasim (United Arab Emirates) all made their List A debuts.

=== 2nd List A ===
15 October 2016
Scorecard

Oman; 183/9 (50 overs)	v	United Arab Emirates; 186/4 (41.1 overs)
Mohammad Nadeem 42 (95); Ahmed Raza 3/19 (10 overs)		Muhammad Usman 53* (56); Amir Ali 2/31 (7.4 overs)

United Arab Emirates won by 6 wickets
ICC Global Cricket Academy, Dubai
Umpires: Razzaq Shah and Sachin Solanki

- Oman won the toss and elected to bat.
- Mohammad Nadeem (Oman); Atif Ali Khan (United Arab Emirates) both made their List A debuts.

=== 3rd List A ===
17 October 2016
Scorecard

Oman; 241 (47.5 overs)	v	United Arab Emirates; 169 (42.4 overs)
Arun Poulose 47 (63); Amjad Javed 4/59 (9 overs)		Muhammad Usman 54 (60); Zeeshan Maqsood 4/14 (3.4 overs)

Oman won by 72 runs
ICC Global Cricket Academy, Dubai
Umpires: Shiju Sam (UAE) and Suneej Thottathil (UAE)

- United Arab Emirates won the toss and elected to field.
- Mehran Khan (Oman) and Rohit Singh (United Arab Emirates) both made their List A debuts.
