= West Indian cricket team against Pakistan in the UAE in 2016–17 =

International cricket tour

West Indian cricket team against Pakistan in 2016–17
	Pakistan	West Indies
- Dates: 20 September – 3 November 2016
Captains	Misbah ul Haq (Tests); Azhar Ali (ODIs); Sarfaraz Ahmed (T20Is)	Jason Holder (Tests and ODIs); Carlos Brathwaite (T20Is)

Test series
- Result: Pakistan won the 3-match series 2–1
Most runs	Azhar Ali (474)	Kraigg Brathwaite (328)
Most wickets	Yasir Shah (21)	Devendra Bishoo (18)
- Player of the series: Yasir Shah (Pak)

One Day International series
- Results: Pakistan won the 3-match series 3–0
Most runs	Babar Azam (360)	Marlon Samuels (116)
Most wickets	Mohammad Nawaz (7)	Alzarri Joseph (4); Jason Holder (4)
- Player of the series: Babar Azam (Pak)

Twenty20 International series
- Results: Pakistan won the 3-match series 3–0
Most runs	Babar Azam (101)	Dwayne Bravo (84)
Most wickets	Imad Wasim (9)	Kesrick Williams (2); Samuel Badree (2)
- Player of the series: Imad Wasim (Pak)

The West Indian cricket team toured the United Arab Emirates from September to November 2016 to play three Twenty20 International (T20Is), three One Day Internationals (ODIs) and three Test matches against Pakistan. The West Indies Cricket Board (WICB) agreed in principle for one of the Test matches to be played as a day/night match.

Originally, the schedule was going to be two Tests, five ODIs and two T20Is. In May 2016, the Pakistan Cricket Board (PCB) began looking at the possibility for the series to be held in Sri Lanka. However, the idea was dismissed as it would be monsoon season in Sri Lanka. The fixtures, including the day/night Test at the Dubai International Cricket Stadium, Dubai, were confirmed by the PCB in August 2016.

The first Test in Dubai was Pakistan's 400th Test match and the second day/night Test. Prior to the start of the day/night Test, both captains voiced their support for the format. Pakistan's captain Misbah-ul-Haq said "At the moment, it looks like (the future) keeping in mind the interest of the audience, who want to watch Test cricket". The West Indies captain Jason Holder said that he liked the concept and that "we have to give a chance to something new". However, at the start of the first day of the Test, only 68 fans were inside the stadium, with the figure growing to approximately 600 by close of play. Pakistan's coach Mickey Arthur said after the conclusion of the day/night Test that "there's some work to do with the pink ball. I don't think it's up to the standard required yet and I think that's the only thing holding day/night cricket back".

Pakistan won both the ODI and T20I series 3–0. The Test series was also won by Pakistan, by the margin of 2–1. The West Indies won the final Test match of the series, which was their first Test win with Jason Holder as captain. After the victory, Holder said "we showed character and fight. Credit must go to Kraigg Brathwaite. He played an outstanding innings in the first innings and took responsibility of the chase in the second innings".

== Squads ==
Tests		ODIs		T20Is	
Pakistan	West Indies	Pakistan	West Indies	Pakistan	West Indies
Misbah-ul-Haq (c); Azhar Ali (vc); Sarfaraz Ahmed; Rahat Ali; Mohammad Amir; Sami Aslam; Babar Azam; Zulfiqar Babar; Imran Khan; Sohail Khan; Younis Khan; Mohammad Nawaz; Wahab Riaz; Asad Shafiq; Yasir Shah	Jason Holder (c); Kraigg Brathwaite (vc); Devendra Bishoo; Jermaine Blackwood; Carlos Brathwaite; Darren Bravo; Roston Chase; Miguel Cummins; Shane Dowrich; Shannon Gabriel; Shai Hope; Leon Johnson; Alzarri Joseph; Marlon Samuels; Jomel Warrican	Azhar Ali (c); Sarfaraz Ahmed (vc); Umar Akmal; Hasan Ali; Rahat Ali; Mohammad Amir; Babar Azam; Sharjeel Khan; Sohail Khan; Shoaib Malik; Mohammad Nawaz; Wahab Riaz; Mohammad Rizwan; Asad Shafiq; Yasir Shah; Imad Wasim	Jason Holder (c); Sulieman Benn; Carlos Brathwaite; Kraigg Brathwaite; Darren Bravo; Jonathan Carter; Johnson Charles; Shannon Gabriel; Alzarri Joseph; Evin Lewis; Sunil Narine; Ashley Nurse; Kieron Pollard; Denesh Ramdin; Marlon Samuels	Sarfaraz Ahmed (c); Umar Akmal; Hasan Ali; Mohammad Amir; Babar Azam; Sharjeel Khan; Khalid Latif; Shoaib Malik; Saad Nasim; Mohammad Nawaz; Rumman Raees; Wahab Riaz; Mohammad Rizwan; Sohail Tanvir; Imad Wasim	Carlos Brathwaite (c); Samuel Badree; Dwayne Bravo; Johnson Charles; Andre Fletcher; Jason Holder; Evin Lewis; Sunil Narine; Kieron Pollard; Nicholas Pooran; Rovman Powell; ~~Andre Russell~~; Marlon Samuels; Jerome Taylor; Chadwick Walton; Kesrick Williams

Andre Russell was ruled out of the West Indies T20I squad after withdrawing due to a personal matter. He was replaced by Kesrick Williams. Younis Khan was added to Pakistan's Test squad for the 2nd Test after missing the 1st Test due to dengue fever.

== Tour matches ==
=== T20: Emirates Cricket Board XI vs West Indies ===
20 September 2016
Scorecard

West Indies; 166/7 (20 overs)	v	Emirates Cricket Board XI; 144/6 (20 overs)
Nicholas Pooran 47* (23); Mohammad Naveed 3/20 (4 overs); Ahmed Raza 3/20 (4 overs)		Mohammed Qasim 46 (54); Samuel Badree 3/20 (4 overs)

West Indies won by 22 runs
ICC Academy, Dubai
Umpires: Ahsan Raza (Pak) and Shozab Raza (Pak)

- West Indies won the toss and elected to bat.
- 15 players per side (11 batting, 11 fielding).

=== Two-day: Emirates Cricket Board XI vs West Indies ===
3–4 October 2016
Scorecard

West Indies	v	Emirates Cricket Board XI
249/6d (70 overs); Shai Hope 59 (89); Rohan Mustafa 1/26 (9 overs)		117 (39.1 overs); Rohan Mustafa 44* (103); Jonathan Carter 4/30 (10 overs)
173/7d (51 overs); Shane Dowrich 52* (108); Ahmed Raza 3/69 (21 overs)		43/1 (15 overs); Mohammed Qasim 21* (41); Roston Chase 1/17 (6 overs)

Match drawn
ICC Academy, Dubai
Umpires: Razzak Ali (UAE) and Shiju Sam (UAE)

- West Indies won the toss and elected to bat.
- 15 players per side (11 batting, 11 fielding).

=== First-class: Pakistan Cricket Board Patron's XI vs West Indies ===
7–9 October 2016 (D/N)
Scorecard

PCB Patron's XI	v	West Indies
308 (90 overs); Adnan Akmal 69 (67); Devendra Bishoo 5/107 (36 overs)		297 (132.5 overs); Darren Bravo 91 (267); Shahzaib Ahmed 5/85 (35 overs)
26/3 (16 overs); Mohammad Hafeez 9 (18); Kraigg Brathwaite 2/3 (4 overs)

Match drawn
Sharjah Cricket Stadium, Sharjah
Umpires: Ahsan Raza (Pak) and Shozab Raza (Pak)

- Pakistan Cricket Board Patron's XI won the toss and elected to bat.

== T20I series ==
=== 1st T20I ===
23 September 2016
Scorecard

West Indies; 115 (19.5 overs)	v	Pakistan; 116/1 (14.2 overs)
Dwayne Bravo 55 (54); Imad Wasim 5/14 (4 overs)		Babar Azam 55* (37); Samuel Badree 1/27 (4 overs)

Pakistan won by 9 wickets
Dubai International Cricket Stadium, Dubai
Umpires: Ahsan Raza (Pak) and Shozab Raza (Pak)
Player of the match: Imad Wasim (Pak)

- Pakistan won the toss and elected to field.
- Nicholas Pooran (WI) made his T20I debut.
- Imad Wasim became the first spinner for Pakistan to take five wickets in a T20I.

=== 2nd T20I ===
24 September 2016
Scorecard

Pakistan; 160/4 (20 overs)	v	West Indies; 144/9 (20 overs)
Sarfaraz Ahmed 46* (32); Samuel Badree 1/24 (4 overs); Carlos Brathwaite 1/24 (4 overs)		Sunil Narine 30(17); Sohail Tanvir 3/13 (4 overs)

Pakistan won by 16 runs
Dubai International Cricket Stadium, Dubai
Umpires: Ahmed Shahab (Pak) and Shozab Raza (Pak)
Player of the match: Sarfaraz Ahmed (Pak)

- West Indies won the toss and elected to field.
- Shoaib Malik became the third batsman for Pakistan to pass 1,500 runs in T20Is.
- Sohail Tanvir became the fourth bowler for Pakistan to take 50 wickets in T20Is.

=== 3rd T20I ===
27 September 2016
Scorecard

West Indies; 103/5 (20 overs)	v	Pakistan; 108/2 (15.1 overs)
Marlon Samuels 42* (59); Imad Wasim 3/21 (4 overs)		Shoaib Malik 43* (34); Kesrick Williams 2/15 (4 overs)

Pakistan won by 8 wickets
Sheikh Zayed Cricket Stadium, Abu Dhabi
Umpires: Ahsan Raza (Pak) and Shozab Raza (Pak)
Player of the match: Imad Wasim (Pak)

- Pakistan won the toss and elected to field.
- Rumman Raees (Pak) and Kesrick Williams (WI) both made their T20I debuts.
- This was Pakistan's first whitewash in a three-match T20I series.

== ODI series ==
=== 1st ODI ===
30 September 2016 (D/N)
Scorecard

Pakistan; 284/9 (49 overs)	v	West Indies; 175 (38.4 overs)
Babar Azam 120 (131); Carlos Brathwaite 3/54 (10 overs)		Marlon Samuels 46 (59); Mohammad Nawaz 4/42 (10 overs)

Pakistan won by 111 runs (DLS method)
Sharjah Cricket Stadium, Sharjah
Umpires: Ahsan Raza (Pak) and Ruchira Palliyaguruge (SL)
Player of the match: Babar Azam (Pak)

- West Indies won the toss and elected to field.
- A floodlight failure in Pakistan's innings reduced the game to 49 overs per side, with the West Indies set a target of 287 to win.
- Kraigg Brathwaite (WI) made his ODI debut.
- Babar Azam (Pak) scored his first century in ODIs.

=== 2nd ODI ===
2 October 2016 (D/N)
Scorecard

Pakistan; 337/5 (50 overs)	v	West Indies; 278/7 (50 overs)
Babar Azam 123 (126); Jason Holder 2/51 (8 overs)		Darren Bravo 61 (74); Wahab Riaz 2/48 (10 overs)

Pakistan won by 59 runs
Sharjah Cricket Stadium, Sharjah
Umpires: Sundaram Ravi (Ind) and Shozab Raza (Pak)
Player of the match: Babar Azam (Pak)

- Pakistan won the toss and elected to bat.
- Alzarri Joseph (WI) made his ODI debut.

=== 3rd ODI ===
5 October 2016 (D/N)
Scorecard

Pakistan; 308/6 (50 overs)	v	West Indies; 172 (44 overs)
Babar Azam 117 (106); Alzarri Joseph 2/62 (8 overs)		Denesh Ramdin 37 (70); Mohammad Nawaz 3/40 (9 overs)

Pakistan won by 136 runs
Sheikh Zayed Cricket Stadium, Abu Dhabi
Umpires: Ahsan Raza (Pak) and Ruchira Palliyaguruge (SL)
Player of the match: Babar Azam (Pak)

- Pakistan won the toss and elected to bat.
- Evin Lewis (WI) made his ODI debut.
- Babar Azam became the third batsman for Pakistan to score hundreds in three successive ODI innings.
- Babar Azam (Pak) scored most runs in a three-match ODI series (360).
- Azhar Ali became the first Pakistan captain to make three ODI centuries.
- Wahab Riaz (Pak) took his 100th wicket in ODIs.

== Test series ==
=== 1st Test ===
13–17 October 2016 (D/N)
Scorecard

Pakistan	v	West Indies
579/3d (155.3 overs); Azhar Ali 302* (469); Devendra Bishoo 2/125 (35 overs)		357 (123.5 overs); Darren Bravo 87 (258); Yasir Shah 5/121 (43 overs)
123 (31.5 overs); Sami Aslam 44 (61); Devendra Bishoo 8/49 (13.5 overs)		289 (109 overs); Darren Bravo 116 (249); Mohammad Amir 3/63 (23 overs)

Pakistan won by 56 runs
Dubai International Cricket Stadium, Dubai
Umpires: Richard Illingworth (Eng) and Paul Reiffel (Aus)
Player of the match: Azhar Ali (Pak)

- Pakistan won the toss and elected to bat.
- This was Pakistan's 400th Test match.
- This was the second day/night Test match.
- Babar Azam and Mohammad Nawaz (Pak) both made their Test debuts.
- Azhar Ali (Pak) became the first player to score a century, a double-century and a triple-century in a day/night Test, and in the process, passed 4,000 runs in Tests.
- Yasir Shah (Pak) became the joint-second fastest player to take 100 wickets in Tests.
- Devendra Bishoo recorded best figure by a bowler for the West Indies away from home and the best figures in the UAE.
- Devendra Bishoo also recorded the best figures for a visiting bowler in Asia.
- This was Pakistan's narrowest margin of victory in a Test in the UAE.

=== 2nd Test ===
21–25 October 2016
Scorecard

Pakistan	v	West Indies
452 (119.1 overs); Younis Khan 127 (205); Shannon Gabriel 5/96 (23.1 overs)		224 (94.4 overs); Darren Bravo 43 (85); Yasir Shah 4/86 (28.4 overs)
227/2d (67 overs); Azhar Ali 79 (137); Miguel Cummins 1/26 (7 overs)		322 (108 overs); Jermaine Blackwood 95 (127); Yasir Shah 6/124 (39 overs)

Pakistan won by 133 runs
Sheikh Zayed Cricket Stadium, Abu Dhabi
Umpires: Michael Gough (Eng) and Richard Illingworth (Eng)
Player of the match: Yasir Shah (Pak)

- Pakistan won the toss and elected to bat.
- Shannon Gabriel (WI) took his first five-wicket haul in Tests.
- Younis Khan and Misbah-ul-Haq's 175 run partnership in the 1st innings made them Pakistan's most prolific batting pair in Tests.
- Rahat Ali (Pak) took his 50th wicket in Tests.
- Yasir Shah (Pak) took his second ten-wicket haul in Tests.
- This was Misbah-ul-Haq's tenth series win as captain, the most for an Asian captain in Tests.

=== 3rd Test ===
30 October–3 November 2016
Scorecard

Pakistan	v	West Indies
281 (90.5 overs); Sami Aslam 74 (172); Devendra Bishoo 4/77 (21 overs)		337 (115.4 overs); Kraigg Brathwaite 142* (318); Wahab Riaz 5/88 (26.4 overs)
208 (81.3 overs); Azhar Ali 91 (234); Jason Holder 5/30 (17.3 overs)		154/5 (43.5 overs); Shane Dowrich 60* (87); Yasir Shah 3/40 (15 overs)

West Indies won by 5 wickets
Sharjah Cricket Stadium, Sharjah
Umpires: Michael Gough (Eng) and Paul Reiffel (Aus)
Player of the match: Kraigg Brathwaite (WI)

- Pakistan won the toss and elected to bat.
- Misbah-ul-Haq captained Pakistan in the most number of Tests (49).
- Kraigg Brathwaite carried his bat in the first innings becoming the fifth player for the West Indies to do so.
- Jason Holder (WI) took his first five-wicket haul in Tests.
- Jason Holder won his first Test match as captain.
- Kraigg Brathwaite became the first opener to remain unbeaten in both innings of a Test.
- This was the West Indies' first Test victory against Pakistan away from home since 1990.
