= Timeline of TNT Sports =

This is a timeline of the history of TNT Sports (United Kingdom), and of its predecessor, BT Sport.

== BT Sport ==
- 2012
  - 12 June – The announcement of the rights to the Premier League for the next three seasons reveals that BT has won the rights to 38 matches each season. The news followed speculation that ESPN was reconsidering its position in the UK.
  - September – BT wins the rights to Premiership Rugby and its associated 7s Series, and in November it picks up the rights to American, Brazilian, French and Italian top-flight football.
- 2013
  - January – BT announces that they will broadcast Women's Tennis Association matches from 21 tournaments.
  - 25 February – BT agrees to acquire ESPN's UK and Ireland TV channels business, consisting of ESPN and ESPN America, as well as the rights associated with the channel, such as the FA Cup. BT will continue to broadcast at least one ESPN branded channel as part of its BT Sport package of services.
  - 2 May – BT Sport 1 and BT Sport 2 are added to the BT TV electronic programming guides with an on-screen message saying that the channels are coming soon.
  - 3 May – The channels are added to Sky and are called Sailing 1 and Sailing 2.
  - 7 May – BT Sport acquires the rights to air Ultimate Fighting Championship events and taped programming in the UK and Ireland for three years, from 1 August.
  - 9 May – It is announced that BT Sport had acquired an exclusive five-year deal to broadcast MotoGP races from the 2014 season, including free practices and qualifying as well as full coverage of Moto2 and Moto3. BT Sport also buys the rights to the FA WSL, A-League, the Football Conference for two years with 25-30 live games a season, including the end-of-season play-offs. and programming from Red Bull Media House.
  - 1 August – BT Sport launches at 6pm.
  - 3 August – BT Sport Films launches, showing feature-length sports documentary films.
  - 15 August – BT signs a wholesale deal with Virgin Media bringing the channels free of charge to customers on the TV XL package.
  - 9 November – BT announces an £897 million deal with UEFA to broadcast the Champions League and Europa League exclusively on BT Sport from the 2015–16 season for three years. The deal will end two decades of the competition being broadcast free-to-air on ITV, although BT stated that the finals of both competitions and at least one match per season involving each participating British team would still be broadcast free-to-air.
  - 1 December – BT Sport shows its first NBA match, thereby adding professional basketball to its broadcasting of the college game which it shows as part of its coverage of the NCAA.
- 2014
  - January – BT Sport acquires the rights to broadcast the World Rally Championship for the 2014 season.
  - June – BT Sport broadcasts men's tennis for the first time when it shows live coverage of the AEGON Championships tennis tournament from Queen's Club.
  - September – BT Sport launches its interactive service BT Sport Extra.
  - 11 December – BT Sport becomes the secondary rights holder to the BDO World Darts Championship.
- 2015
  - January – BT Sport broadcasts the BDO World Darts Championship.
  - 9 June – ESPN is rebranded as BT Sport ESPN.
  - 12–28 June – BT Sport broadcasts its first multi-sport event when it covers the 2015 European Games.
  - 1 August – BT Sport launches a fourth channel - BT Sport Europe. The channel will be used to show its coverage of European football and European rugby union.
  - 2 August – BT Sport broadcasts the FA Community Shield for the first time.
  - 23 August – BT Sport announces that it has won the rights for Australia's home matches for five years starting in the 2016-17 season. This means that BT would show The Ashes series between England and Australia in 2017-18 with the deal also including the Big Bash League, the Women's Ashes and the Women's Big Bash League.
  - September – BT Sport launches two more channels. BT Sport Showcase will show selected coverage on a free-to-air basis and BT Sport Ultra HD features selected coverage in 4K.
- 2016
  - BT Sport shows its first live speedway when it replaces Eurosport as broadcaster of the Speedway World Championship.
  - 22 May – BT Sport shows the finals of the FA Vase and FA Trophy as a double header. This builds upon BT's coverage of non league cup football as the previous year BT had shown the final of the FA Trophy.
  - July – BT Sport becomes the rights holder of the Scottish League Cup.
  - 4 August – BT Sport Europe is rebranded as BT Sport 3 so that it can show the full range of coverage from BT Sport.
  - 13 August – BT Sport launches its football scores programme BT Sport Score.
  - September – BT Sport becomes the official UK broadcast partner of rugby union's European Champions and Challenge Cup competitions.
- 2017
  - 8 April – BT Sport starts showing boxing following a deal with Frank Warren Promotions.
  - April – BT Sport replaces Sky Sports as the rights holder to British Speedway.
  - 21 April – BT Sport shows sports gaming for the first time when it broadcasts live coverage of FIFA 17.
  - August – BT Sport broadcasts cricket's Caribbean Premier League for the final time.
  - September – BT Sport begins showing matches from the FA Women's Super League.
- 2018
  - 14 February – BT and Sky agree a £4.4bn three-year deal to show live Premier League football matches from 2019 to 2022, but the amount falls short of the £5.1bn deal struck in 2015.
  - March–May – BT Sport broadcasts the 2018 Indian Premier League. It is a one-off as the following year the event transfers back to Sky Sports.
  - May – BT Sport shows Serie A for the final time as in July it loses rights to Italian football to Eleven Sports
  - June – BT Sport shows the NBA for the final time ahead of the rights transferring to Sky Sports.
  - August – BT Sport becomes the exclusive holder of all rights to the UEFA Champions League. The deal includes live coverage and highlights. Consequently, for the first time, there is no free-to-air coverage of the competition.
  - 15 September – BT Sport launches its pay-per-view channel BT Sport Box Office.
  - 4 December – The standard definition feeds of BT Sport stop broadcasting on Virgin Media.
- 2019
  - 2 August – BT Sport 4K UHD is rebranded as BT Sport Ultimate.
  - 13 October — BT Sport shows the Euroformula Open and International GT Open for the final time.
  - 3 November – BT Sport ends its coverage of the WTA, having broadcast women's tennis since 2014. The rights pass to Amazon Prime for the 2020 season.
  - 8 December – BT Sport broadcasts the Scottish League Cup for the final time. The rights transfer to Premier Sports.
- 2020
  - January – BT Sport takes over as broadcaster of U.S. professional wrestling promotion WWE.
  - March – BT Sport shows the Scottish Professional Football League for the final time. In recent seasons BT had shared the rights with Sky Sports but new deal sees Sky obtaining all of the rights to the SPL.
  - 29 August – BT Sport shows the FA Community Shield for the sixth and final time.
  - 8 September – It is announced that all of September's Premier League fixtures will be shown on TV due to fans not being into stadiums due to the COVID-19 pandemic. This includes a weekly 3pm Saturday afternoon match, shown on TV in the UK for the first time with BT showing three of the additional fixtures, including one on Saturday at 3pm.
  - 9 October – The Premier League announces that October's games not scheduled for TV broadcast will be shown on a pay-per-view basis on either Sky Sports Box Office or BT Sport Box Office.
  - 13 November – The Premier League confirms that the broadcasting of matches via pay-per-view will end and that all games in December and January will be shown by either Sky Sports and BT Sport with one game also being shown on both Amazon Prime and the BBC.
- 2021
  - 5 February – BT Sport secures the rights to all international and domestic cricket played in the West Indies and New Zealand for the next two years. This includes England's tour to the West Indies in 2022.
  - 9 May – BT Sport's coverage of the FA Women's Super League ends when the non-terrestrial rights to the competition transfer to Sky Sports.
  - 13 May – The Premier League announces that, for the first time, the next three-year broadcasting contact has been awarded without a bidding process. Consequently, BT Sport is paying the same amount for the same packages as it did for the 2019-2022 contact.
  - 15 May – BT Sport coverage of the FA Cup ends as the rights pass to the BBC and ITV.
  - May – BT Sport broadcasts German domestic football for the final time. Sky Sports replaces BT Sport as broadcaster of Germany's Bundesliga and Supercup from the start of the following season.
  - 21 August – Serie A football returns to BT Sport after having been shown by other broadcasters since 2018. The new deal sees BT Sport showing six matches per round for the next three seasons.
- 2022
  - 11 April – BT Sport secures the rights to show live coverage of the Canadian Premier League.
  - 1 August – BT Sport ESPN is renamed BT Sport 4.
- 2023
  - 28 May – BT Sport Score is broadcast for the final time. The rolling scores and results programme ends as part of a review into non-live sports programming ahead of BT Sport becoming TNT Sports.
  - 18 July – After just under ten years on air, BT Sport closes down at 6am, and is immediately replaced by TNT Sports.

== TNT Sports ==
- 2022
  - 11 May – Warner Bros. Discovery EMEA announces that it has reached an agreement to combine its Eurosport UK business with BT Sport in a 50/50 joint venture, in a transaction scheduled to be completed by the end of 2022 pending approval from regulators and sports bodies.
  - 22 July – Warner Bros. Discovery EMEA acquisition of BT Sport is approved.
- 2023
  - 21 February – It is announced that BT Sport will be renamed TNT Sports in July and that Discovery+ will be the new streaming home of the service.
  - 18 July – At 6am, TNT Sports launches. It carries the same line-up of programming and sports coverage as BT Sport had done, with the exception of ESPN programming and American College Sport.
  - 24 October – TNT replaces Sky as rights holder to the NBA. The deal will see TNT show more than 250 games each season.
- 2024
  - 25 January – TNT Sports begins showing coverage of the India national cricket team, starting with the India v England test series.
- 2025
  - January – TNT Sports' coverage of the WWE ends when all WWE content in the UK will be broadcast through Netflix.
  - 28 February – TNT Sports's range of sports significantly expands when it starts showing coverage aired on Eurosport, which on this day is folded into TNT Sports. Sports which will move to the TNT Sports banner include the Olympic Games, cycling (including the Tour de France), snooker, tennis (including three of the four majors) and winter sports.
  - April – TNT's coverage of boxing fights promoted by Queensberry Boxing ends. The rights move to DAZN.
  - 22 June – Coverage of the NBA ends as the rights return to Sky Sports as part of a new 11-year deal.
  - July – Transmission of TNT Sports moves from Red Bee Media and Encompass Digital Media in the United Kingdom to WBD in the United States. Production and studios remain in the UK.
  - 10 August – TNT Sports takes over as broadcaster of the FA Community Shield.
  - August – The new arrangements for broadcasting of the Premier League sees a significant increase in the number of games broadcast on television, with all matches not kicking off at 3pm on a Saturday now being shown live although TNT's total of 52 games/season remains the same. This arrangement runs until the end of the 2028/29 season.
  - Some television coverage of the FA Cup returns behind a paywall when TNT Sports begins a four-year deal with the Football Association to show the competition.
- 2026
  - 23 July-2 August – TNT Sports will show live coverage of the 2026 Commonwealth Games. It outbid the BBC for the rights to the event which the Corporation had shown since 1954.
- 2027
  - TNT Sports will lose the rights to the European club football tournaments after the 2027 finals. The rights to the Champions League will transfer to streaming services and the rights to the Europa League and UEFA Conference League will move to Sky Sports.

== See also ==
- Timeline of Sky Sports
- Timeline of Premier Sports
