= Colin Peake =

Namibian cricketer (born 1989)

Personal information
- Full name: Colin Peake
- Born: Unknown

International information
- National side: Namibia
- Source: ESPNcricinfo, 16 October 2016

Colin Peake (born 11 September 1989) is a Namibian cricketer. He made his first-class cricket debut for Namibia against Western Province. on 6 October 2016. He made his Twenty20 (T20) debut for Namibia in the 2017 Desert T20 Challenge against the United Arab Emirates on 15 January 2017.

In August 2018, he was named in Namibia's squad for the 2018 Africa T20 Cup. In October 2018, he was named in Namibia's squad in the Southern sub region group for the 2018–19 ICC World Twenty20 Africa Qualifier tournament in Botswana.
