= Afghan cricket team in the United Arab Emirates in 2016–17 =

International cricket tour

	United Arab Emirates	Afghanistan
- Dates: 14 – 18 December 2016
Captains	Amjad Javed (1st & 2nd T20I); Rohan Mustafa (3rd T20I)	Asghar Stanikzai

Twenty20 International series
- Results: Afghanistan won the 3-match series 3–0
Most runs	Shaiman Anwar (150)	Mohammad Shahzad (113)
Most wickets	Amjad Javed (4); Mohammad Shahzad (4)	Rashid Khan (6)

The Afghanistan cricket team toured the United Arab Emirates to play the United Arab Emirates cricket team in December 2016. The tour consisted of three Twenty20 International (T20I) matches. The first two matches were close contests. Afghanistan won the series 3–0.

== Squads ==
United Arab Emirates	Afghanistan
Amjad Javed (c); Qadeer Ahmed; Shaiman Anwar; Imran Haider; Amjad Khan; Atif Ali Khan; Rohan Mustafa; Usman Mushtaq; Adnan Mufti; Mohammad Naveed; Mohammed Qasim; Ahmed Raza; Ghulam Shabber (wk); Kamran Shazad; Rameez Shahzad; Muhammed Shanil; Muhammad Usman	Asghar Stanikzai (c); Fareed Ahmad; Aftab Alam; Usman Ghani; Amir Hamza; Karim Janat; Rashid Khan; Mohammad Nabi; Gulbadin Naib; Mohammad Shahzad (wk); Samiullah Shinwari; Najeeb Tarakai; Najibullah Zadran; Hazratullah Zazai

== T20I series ==
=== 1st T20I ===
14 December 2016
13:00
Scorecard

Afghanistan; 161/6 (20 overs)	v	United Arab Emirates; 150/7 (20 overs)
Mohammad Shahzad 38 (29); Mohammad Shahzad 3/34 (4 overs)		Rameez Shahzad 49 (32); Karim Janat 3/31 (4 overs)

Afghanistan won by 11 runs
ICC Academy Ground, Dubai
Umpires: Ahmed Shah Durrani (Afg) and Iftikhar Ali (UAE)
Player of the match: Karim Janat (Afg)

- Afghanistan won the toss and elected to bat.
- Fareed Ahmad, Karim Janat (Afg) Ghulam Shabber, Mohammed Qasim and Rameez Shahzad (UAE) all made their T20I debuts.
- Ahmed Shah Durrani (Afg) stood in his first T20I as an umpire.

=== 2nd T20I ===
16 December 2016
14:00
Scorecard

United Arab Emirates; 179/4 (20 overs)	v	Afghanistan; 183/5 (19.4 overs)
Shaiman Anwar 60 (50); Fareed Ahmad 2/39 (4 overs)		Najibullah Zadran 55* (24); Amjad Javed 3/40 (4 overs)

Afghanistan won by 5 wickets
Dubai International Cricket Stadium, Dubai
Umpires: Ahmed Shah Durrani (Afg) and Akbar Ali (UAE)
Player of the match: Najibullah Zadran (Afg)

- United Arab Emirates won the toss and elected to bat.
- Hazratullah Zazai (Afg) and Atif Ali Khan (UAE) both made their T20I debuts.
- This was Afghanistan's 50th T20I match.

=== 3rd T20I ===
18 December 2016
13:00
Scorecard

Afghanistan; 189/5 (20 overs)	v	United Arab Emirates; 145/8 (20 overs)
Mohammad Shahzad 44 (30); Rohan Mustafa 2/27 (3 overs)		Rohan Mustafa 58 (35); Rashid Khan 3/14 (4 overs)

Afghanistan won by 44 runs
ICC Academy Ground, Dubai
Umpires: Akbar Ali (UAE) and Iftikhar Ali (UAE)
Player of the match: Rashid Khan (Afg)

- Afghanistan won the toss and elected to bat.
- Imran Haider and Muhammed Shanil (UAE) both made their T20I debuts.
