= Cameron McAuslan =

Hong Kong cricketer (born 1998)

Personal information
- Full name: Cameron Lachlan McAuslan
- Born: 1 June 1998 (age 28); Hong Kong
- Batting: Right-handed
- Bowling: Right-arm medium-fast
- Role: Batsman

International information
- National side: Hong Kong
- ODI debut (cap 39): 22 January 2017 v Scotland
- Last ODI: 26 January 2017 v United Arab Emirates

Career statistics
Competition	ODI	LA
Matches	2	4
Runs scored	35	53
Batting average	17.50	13.25
100s/50s	0/0	0/0
Top score	27	27
Catches/stumpings	0/–	0/–
- Source: ESPNcricinfo, 28 January 2023

Cameron Lachlan McAuslan (born 1 June 1998) is a Hong Kong cricketer.

McAuslan is based in New Zealand and attended Otago Boys' High School in Dunedin, being part of their 1st XI squad that finished third in The Secondary School Boys’ First XI Cup in December 2016. He was selected in the Hong Kong squad for 2017 Desert T20 Challenge. He made his One Day International (ODI) debut for Hong Kong against Scotland on 22 January 2017.

He made his first-class debut against Papua New Guinea in the 2015–17 ICC Intercontinental Cup on 29 November 2017.

In August 2018, he was named in Hong Kong's squad for the 2018 Asia Cup Qualifier tournament, and after Hong Kong won the qualifier tournament, in Hong Kong's squad for the 2018 Asia Cup. In November 2019, he was named in Hong Kong's squad for the 2019 ACC Emerging Teams Asia Cup in Bangladesh.
