= Atif Ali Khan =

Emirati cricketer (born 1986)

Personal information
- Born: 11 February 1986 (age 40); Sialkot, Pakistan
- Batting: Right-handed
- Bowling: Left arm medium fast
- Role: Bowler

International information
- National side: United Arab Emirates
- Only T20I (cap 33): 16 December 2016 v Afghanistan
- Source: ESPNcricinfo, 15 October 2016

Atif Ali Khan (born 11 February 1986) is a Pakistani-born cricketer who played for the United Arab Emirates national cricket team. He made his List A debut for the United Arab Emirates cricket team in three-match series against Oman in October 2016. He made his Twenty20 International (T20I) debut against Afghanistan on 16 December 2016.
