= Swapnil Khadye =

Omani cricketer

Personal information
- Full name: Swapnil Sunil Khadye
- Batting: Right-handed
- Role: Wicketkeeper batsman
- Source: ESPNcricinfo, 13 October 2016

Swapnil Khadye is a cricketer who played for the Oman national cricket team. He made his List A debut for the Oman cricket team in a three-match bilateral series against the United Arab Emirates in October 2016. Later in the same month, he played for Oman in the 2016 ICC World Cricket League Division Four tournament. In January 2018, he was named in Oman's squad for the 2018 ICC World Cricket League Division Two tournament.
