= 2016–17 United Arab Emirates Tri-Nation Series =

International cricket tournament

- Date: 22–26 January 2017
- Location: United Arab Emirates
- Result: United Arab Emirates won the series
Teams
| Hong Kong | Scotland | United Arab Emirates |
Captains
| Babar Hayat | Kyle Coetzer | Rohan Mustafa |
Most runs
| Nizakat Khan (118) | Matthew Cross (68) | Muhammad Usman (65) |
Most wickets
| Ehsan Khan (4) Nadeem Ahmed (4) | Josh Davey (3) | Imran Haider (7) |

The 2016–17 United Arab Emirates Tri-Nation Series was a One Day International (ODI) cricket tournament that was held in the United Arab Emirates from 22 to 26 January 2017. It was a tri-nation series among the national representative cricket teams of Hong Kong, Scotland and the United Arab Emirates. The United Arab Emirates won the three-match series, following a six-wicket win in the final match against Hong Kong.

== Squads ==
| Hong Kong Coach: Simon Cook | Scotland Coach: Grant Bradburn | United Arab Emirates Coach: Owais Shah |
|---|---|---|
| Babar Hayat (c); Nadeem Ahmed; Tanveer Ahmed; Waqas Barkat; Christopher Carter; Kyle Christie; Aizaz Khan; Ehsan Khan; Nizakat Khan; Waqas Khan; Cameron McAuslan; Ehsan Nawaz; Anshuman Rath; Shahid Wasif | Kyle Coetzer (c); Richie Berrington; Matthew Cross; Josh Davey; Con de Lange (vc); Michael Leask; Calum MacLeod; George Munsey; Safyaan Sharif; Chris Sole; Craig Wallace; Mark Watt; Brad Wheal | Rohan Mustafa (c); Shaiman Anwar; Imran Haider; Amjad Javed; Zahoor Khan; Adnan Mufti; Mohammad Naveed; Mohammed Qasim; Ahmed Raza; Ghulam Shabber; Mohammad Shahzad; Rameez Shahzad; Muhammed Shanil; Muhammad Usman |

== Points table ==
| Pos | Team | Pld | W | L | T | NR | BP | Pts | NRR |
|---|---|---|---|---|---|---|---|---|---|
| 1 | United Arab Emirates | 2 | 2 | 0 | 0 | 0 | 0 | 4 | 0.892 |
| 2 | Hong Kong | 2 | 1 | 1 | 0 | 0 | 0 | 2 | −0.282 |
| 3 | Scotland | 2 | 0 | 2 | 0 | 0 | 0 | 0 | −0.630 |

Source: ESPNcricinfo

== Matches ==
=== 1st ODI ===
22 January 2017
10.00
Scorecard

| Scotland; 205 (48.4 overs) | v | Hong Kong; 206/3 (44.1 overs) |
| Craig Wallace 53 (69); Nadeem Ahmed 4/33 (10 overs) | | Babar Hayat 79* (110); Josh Davey 1/33 (9 overs) |

Hong Kong won by 7 wickets
Sheikh Zayed Cricket Stadium, Abu Dhabi
Umpires: Akbar Ali (UAE) and Iftikhar Ali (UAE)
Player of the match: Babar Hayat (HK)

- Hong Kong won the toss and elected to field.
- Cameron McAuslan (HK) and George Munsey (Sco) both made their ODI debuts.
- Akbar Ali and Iftikhar Ali (UAE) both stood in their first ODI as umpires.

=== 2nd ODI ===
24 January 2017
10.00
Scorecard

| Scotland; 173 (45.2 overs) | v | United Arab Emirates; 174/6 (41.5 overs) |
| Richie Berrington 50 (88); Zahoor Khan 3/17 (15.2 overs) | | Muhammad Usman 45 (58); Josh Davey 2/17 (5 overs) |

United Arab Emirates won by 4 wickets
Dubai International Cricket Stadium, Dubai
Umpires: Akbar Ali (UAE) and Tabarak Dar (HK)
Player of the match: Adnan Mufti (UAE)

- Scotland won the toss and elected to bat.
- Adnan Mufti, Ghulam Shabber, Imran Haider, Mohammed Qasim and Zahoor Khan (United Arab Emirates) all made their ODI debuts.

=== 3rd ODI ===
26 January 2017
10.00
Scorecard

| Hong Kong; 174 (48.5 overs) | v | United Arab Emirates; 175/4 (38.2 overs) |
| Nizakat Khan 93 (111); Imran Haider 4/25 (10 overs) | | Shaiman Anwar 50 (62); Ehsan Khan 3/30 (10 overs) |

United Arab Emirates won by 6 wickets
Dubai International Cricket Stadium, Dubai
Umpires: Alex Dowdalls (Sco) and Iftikhar Ali (UAE)
Player of the match: Imran Haider (UAE)

- United Arab Emirates won the toss and elected to field.
- Alex Dowdalls (Sco) stood in his first ODI as an umpire.
