= Mohammed Qasim =

Emirati cricketer (born 1991)

Personal information
- Full name: Mohammed Qasim
- Born: 3 August 1991 (age 35); Sialkot, Pakistan
- Source: Cricinfo, 21 September 2016

Mohammed Qasim (born 3 August 1991) is a Pakistani-born cricketer who played for the United Arab Emirates national cricket team. He made his first-class debut for the United Arab Emirates against Scotland in the 2015–17 ICC Intercontinental Cup on 9 August 2016. On 20 September 2016 he scored the most runs for the Emirates Cricket Board XI team against the West Indies in a T20 tour match. He made his List A debut in the UAE's three-match series against Oman in October 2016.

He made his Twenty20 International (T20I) debut for the United Arab Emirates against Afghanistan on 14 December 2016. He made his One Day International (ODI) debut against Scotland on 24 January 2017.
