= Imran Haider =

Emirati cricketer (born 1987)

Personal information
- Full name: Imran Haider
- Born: 31 October 1987 (age 39); Lahore, Punjab, Pakistan
- Batting: Right-handed
- Bowling: Right-arm leg break

International information
- National side: United Arab Emirates
- ODI debut (cap 69): 24 January 2017 v Scotland
- Last ODI: 16 April 2019 v Zimbabwe
- T20I debut (cap 34): 18 December 2016 v Afghanistan
- Last T20I: 24 October 2019 v Nigeria

Career statistics
Competition	ODI	T20I	FC	LA
Matches	20	11	9	32
Runs scored	58	4	72	80
Batting average	8.28	–	10.28	7.27
100s/50s	0/0	0/0	0/0	0/0
Top score	18*	4*	20*	18*
Balls bowled	943	186	1177	1,513
Wickets	32	7	21	47
Bowling average	26.28	35.71	31.14	27.65
5 wickets in innings	0	0	1	0
10 wickets in match	0	0	0	0
Best bowling	4/25	1/16	6/132	4/25
Catches/stumpings	5/–	1/–	3/–	8/–
- Source: Cricinfo, 1 October 2021

Imran Haider (Urdu: عمران حیدر; born 31 October 1987) is a Pakistani-born cricketer who played for the United Arab Emirates national cricket team. He made his List A debut for the United Arab Emirates cricket team in their three-match series against Oman in October 2016.

He made his Twenty20 International (T20I) debut against Afghanistan on 18 December 2016. He made his One Day International (ODI) debut against Scotland on 24 January 2017. He made his first-class debut on 7 April 2017 against Papua New Guinea in the 2015–17 ICC Intercontinental Cup.

In January 2018, he was named in the United Arab Emirates' squad for the 2018 ICC World Cricket League Division Two tournament. In August 2018, he was named in the United Arab Emirates' squad for the 2018 Asia Cup Qualifier tournament. In December 2018, he was named in the United Arab Emirates' team for the 2018 ACC Emerging Teams Asia Cup.

In September 2019, he was named in the United Arab Emirates' squad for the 2019 ICC T20 World Cup Qualifier tournament in the UAE.
