= Arun Poulose =

Indian cricketer (born 1986)

Personal information
- Full name: Arun Poulose
- Born: 22 July 1986 (age 40); Aluva, Kerala, India
- Batting: Right-handed
- Bowling: Right-arm medium

Domestic team information
- Years: Team
- 2007–2011: Kerala
- Only List A: 10 February 2010 Kerala v Tamil Nadu
- T20 debut: 3 April 2007 Kerala v Karnataka
- Last T20: 14 March 2011 Kerala v Haryana

Career statistics
Competition	LA	T20
Matches	1	9
Runs scored	3	137
Batting average	3.00	15.22
100s/50s	0/0	0/0
Top score	3	42
Catches/stumpings	0/–	1/–
- Source: CricketArchive, 10 March 2016

Arun Poulose (born 22 July 1986) is an Indian-born cricketer who plays for the Oman national cricket team. As of November 2025, he has 3 T20Is and 12 T20s.

== Career ==
From 2007 until 2011, Polous played for Kerala. On 3 April 2007 he made his T20 debut in the match between Kerala and Karnataka. He made his List A debut on 10 February 2010 in the Vijay Hazare Trophy in India in the match between Kerala and Tamil Nadu. In February 2016, he was named in Oman's squad for the 2016 ICC World Twenty20. He made his Twenty20 International (T20I) debut for Oman in the 2017 Desert T20 Challenge against the Netherlands on 15 January 2017. The last time that he played was a T20I on 19 January 2017 against Scotland in Dubai.
