= Abdul Halim (cricketer) =

Bangladeshi cricketer (born 1998)

Personal information
- Full name: Abdul Halim
- Born: 2 November 1998 (age 28)
- Batting: Right-handed
- Bowling: Right-arm medium

Career statistics
Competition	First-class	List A
Matches	5	7
Runs scored	3	27
Batting average	0.75	9
100s/50s	0/0	0/0
Top score	2	11
Balls bowled	335	195
Wickets	2	2
Bowling average	109	89
5 wickets in innings	0	0
10 wickets in match	0	0
Best bowling	1/18	1/25
Catches/stumpings	0/0	3/0
- Source: ESPNcricinfo, 5 November 2016

Abdul Halim (born 2 November 1998) is a Bangladeshi first-class and List A cricketer. In December 2015 he was named in Bangladesh's squad for the 2016 Under-19 Cricket World Cup. He made his Twenty20 debut on 31 May 2021, for Dhanmondi Sports Club in the 2021 Dhaka Premier Division Twenty20 Cricket League.
