= Ghulam Shabber =

Emirati cricketer (born 1985)

Personal information
- Full name: Ghulam Shabber
- Born: 12 December 1985 (age 40); Jhang, Pakistan
- Batting: Left-handed
- Role: Wicket-keeper

International information
- National side: United Arab Emirates (2016–2019)
- ODI debut (cap 68): 24 January 2017 v Scotland
- Last ODI: 16 April 2019 v Zimbabwe
- T20I debut (cap 30): 14 December 2016 v Afghanistan
- Last T20I: 18 October 2019 v Oman

Career statistics
Competition	ODI	T20I	LA	T20
Matches	23	17	42	19
Runs scored	500	208	1,168	281
Batting average	21.73	18.90	28.48	21.61
100s/50s	0/4	0/1	0/9	0/2
Top score	90	58*	90	58*
Catches/stumpings	30/2	14/1	50/4	16/1
- Source: Cricinfo, 26 October 2019

Ghulam Shabber (Urdu: غلام شببر; born 12 December 1985) is a Pakistani-born former cricketer who played for the United Arab Emirates national cricket team. He made his List A debut in the UAE's three-match series against Oman in October 2016. He retired from cricket in October 2019, mid-way through the 2019 ICC T20 World Cup Qualifier tournament, and in September 2021, he was handed a four-year ban from the sport in relation to corruption.

== Career ==
Shabber made his Twenty20 International (T20I) debut for the United Arab Emirates against Afghanistan on 14 December 2016. He made his One Day International (ODI) debut for the United Arab Emirates against Scotland on 24 January 2017.

In January 2018, he was named in the United Arab Emirates' squad for the 2018 ICC World Cricket League Division Two tournament. In December 2018, he was named in the United Arab Emirates' team for the 2018 ACC Emerging Teams Asia Cup. In June 2019, he was selected to play for the Toronto Nationals franchise team in the 2019 Global T20 Canada tournament.

In September 2019, he was named in the United Arab Emirates' squad for the 2019 ICC T20 World Cup Qualifier tournament in the UAE. On 21 October 2019, Shabber did not show up for the pre-match meeting ahead of the fixture against Hong Kong. It later transpired that Shabber had left the country without an explanation, before being traced to Pakistan. On 26 October 2019, in an interview for The National, Shabber denied any involvement with corruption and announced his retirement from cricket, citing the poor remuneration for playing. He said that "if there is something with regards to anti-corruption, I am ready to cooperate in Pakistan. But I have decided cricket is not in my future". On 30 October 2019, the Emirates Cricket Board confirmed that they had suspended Shabber for absconding, and that he was part of an International Cricket Councils (ICC) ongoing anti-corruption investigation. In September 2021, the ICC banned Shabber for four years for corruption.
