= ICC Academy =

Cricket academy in the UAE

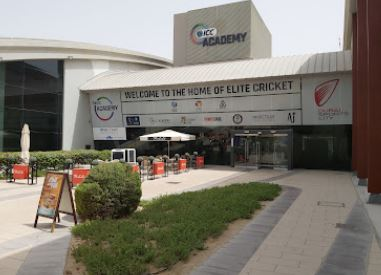
- ICC Academy
- Founder: International Cricket Council
- Established: 2009
- Focus: Cricket
- Owner: International Cricket Council
- Location: Dubai Sports City, Dubai, United Arab Emirates
- Website: www.iccacademy.net

The ICC Academy (ICCA) is a cricket academy located in Dubai Sports City, Dubai, United Arab Emirates, that is managed and administered by the International Cricket Council. It was opened in 2009 under Rod Marsh, who was appointed as Director.

== History ==
ICCA's facilities includes two ovals, each with ten turf pitches, outdoor turf and synthetic practice facilities, indoor practice facilities including Hawk Eye technology and a cricket-specific gymnasium. This Academy was planned and is managed by the International Cricket Council (ICC). The two cricket grounds are installed with floodlights.

The opening was delayed until 2009. The ICCA was finally opened by Sharad Pawar, President ICC, Alan Isaac, VP, ICC and members of Dubai Sports City in October 2010. The ICCA was used for the 2014 ICC Under-19 Cricket World Cup.

== Facilities ==
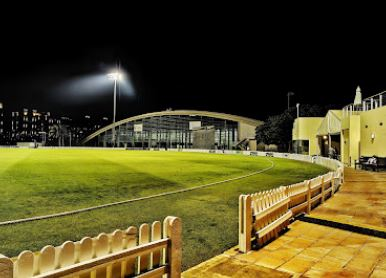
ICC Academy at night under floodlights

- 2 full-size floodlit cricket ovals
- 38 Natural Turf pitches
- 6 indoor practice pitches
- 5700 square foot outdoor conditioning area
- Multi-media team room
- Physiotherapy and Medicine Centre
- 6 lane cricket cage

== Uses ==
The academy regularly hosts international events such as:

- U-19 Cricket World Cup: 2014
- World T20 Qualifier: 2012
- Intercontinental Cup: 2011, 2012
- World Cricket League

It is also used as a training ground by:

- United Arab Emirates
- Pakistan
- South Africa
- Australia
- Sri Lanka

== List of Centuries ==
=== One Day Internationals ===
The following list summarizes the centuries scored in one Day Internationals at the venue.

No.	Score	Player	Team	Balls	Inns.	Opposing team	Date	Result
1	112	Irfan Karim	Kenya	137	2	Canada	13 March 2013	Won
2	129	Nawroz Mangal	Afghanistan	123	1	United Arab Emirates	30 November 2014	Lost
3	132*	Khurram Khan	United Arab Emirates	138	2	Afghanistan	30 November 2014	Won
4	124*	Mark Chapman	Hong Kong	116	1	United Arab Emirates	16 November 2015	Won
5	100	William Porterfield	Ireland	116	1	United Arab Emirates	2 March 2017	Won
6	143*	Anshuman Rath	Hong Kong	137	1	Papua New Guinea	8 December 2017	Won
7	116*	Ed Joyce	Ireland	149	2	United Arab Emirates	11 January 2018	Won
8	139	William Porterfield	Ireland	147	1	United Arab Emirates	13 January 2018	Won
9	102	Andrew Balbirnie	Ireland	109	1	United Arab Emirates	13 January 2018	Won
10	107*	Matthew Cross	Scotland	110	1	United Arab Emirates	21 January 2018	Won
11	121*	Rameez Shahzad	United Arab Emirates	115	2	Scotland	23 January 2018	Won
12	115	Paras Khadka	Nepal	109	2	United Arab Emirates	28 January 2019	Won
13	171	Vaibhav Suryavanshi	India	95	1	United Arab Emirates	12 December 2025	Won

== List of Five Wicket Hauls ==
=== One Day Internationals ===
Five-wicket hauls in One Day Internationals at the ICC Academy Ground
No.	Bowler	Date	Team	Opposing Team	Inn	Overs	Runs	Wkts	Econ	Batsmen	Result
1	Hameed Hassan	4 December 2014	Afghanistan	United Arab Emirates	1	10	45	5	4.50	Saqib Ali; Krishna Chandran; Rohan Mustafa; Saqlain Haider; Fahad Alhashmi	United Arab Emirates Won
2	Zahoor Khan	2 March 2017	United Arab Emirates	Ireland	1	6.3	34	6	5.23	Gary Wilson; William Porterfield; Andy McBrine; George Dockrell; Stuart Thompson; Peter Chase	Ireland Won
3	Sompal Kami	26 January 2019	Nepal	United Arab Emirates	2	6.3	33	5	5.07	Chirag Suri; Ghulam Shabber; Shaiman Anwar; Ashfaq Ahmed; Zahoor Khan	Nepal Won

=== T20Is ===
Five-wicket hauls in Twenty20 Internationals at the ICC Academy Ground
No.	Bowler	Date	Team	Opposing Team	Inn	Overs	Runs	Wkts	Econ	Batsmen	Result
1	Mark Watt	5 February 2016	Scotland	Netherlands	2	4	27	5	6.75	Wesley Barresi; Michael Rippon; Max O'Dowd; Paul van Meekeren; Ahsan Malik	Scotland Won

== See also ==
- International Cricket Council
- Dubai Sports City
