= Muhammed Shanil =

Emirati cricketer (born 1988)

Personal information
- Full name: Muhammed Shanil
- Born: 20 December 1988 (age 37); Azhiyur, Kerala, India
- Batting: Right-handed
- Bowling: Right-arm medium-fast
- Role: Bowling all-rounder

International information
- National side: United Arab Emirates
- Only T20I (cap 35): 18 December 2016 v Afghanistan
- Source: ESPNcricinfo, 13 October 2016

Muhammed Shanil (born 20 December 1988) is an Indian-born cricketer who played for the United Arab Emirates national cricket team. He was appointed as the captain of the UAE team for their three-match List A series against Oman in October 2016, earning his List A debut in the process. He made his Twenty20 International (T20I) debut for the United Arab Emirates against Afghanistan on 18 December 2016, which remains his only T20I appearance.
