= 2017 Everest Premier League =

- Dates: 18 December 2017 – 30 December 2017
- Administrator: EPL Pvt Ltd
- Cricket format: Twenty20
- Tournament format(s): Single round robin and playoffs
- Champions: Biratnagar Warriors (1st title)
- Participants: 6
- Matches: 19
- Player of the series: Babar Hayat (Warriors)
- Most runs: Babar Hayat (Warriors) (318)
- Most wickets: Israrullah (Rhinos) (12); Basant Regmi (Warriors) (12)
- Official website: eplt20.com.np

The 2017 Everest Premier League, also abbreviated as 2017 EPL, and branded as TVS EPL 2017, was the second edition of the Everest Premier League, a professional men's domestic Twenty20 cricket competition in Nepal. The tournament was scheduled to be held from 18 December 2017 to 30 December 2017. The tournament featured six teams and their names were based on the cities.

Biratnagar Warriors were undefeated throughout the tournament. They became champions after defeating Bhairahawa Gladiators by 1 run in the final. Babar Hayat became player of the series for scoring highest runs and hitting most sixes in the tournament. Rohit Kumar Paudel was awarded as most valuable player for finishing well in some matches for Bhairahawa Gladiators. Israrullah and Basant Regmi were leading wicket takers in the tournament with 12 wickets.

== Background ==
EPL Pvt Ltd announced the second season of the Everest Premier League on 30 July 2017 at Durbarmarg, Kathmandu. The founder of EPL, Aamir Akhtar disclosed the prize money of 2.1 million rupees to the winner of the tournament. He also announced that the name of the franchise teams will be based on the cities rather than the corporate houses. The logo of the tournament was also unveiled on the ceremony by the Nepalese national team captain, Paras Khadka and the head coach Jagat Tamatta.

== Player Auctions ==
Dipendra Singh Airee, Shakti Gauchan, Sompal Kami, Paras Khadka, Gyanendra Malla and Sharad Vesawkar were selected as marquee players by each teams before the auction. Each teams were allowed to spend Rs. 1 million. The auction was held on 23 October 2017 and 60 players(10 to each teams), categorized as A, B and C were sold to the franchisee. Binod Bhandari, Karan KC, Sandeep Lamichhane and Aarif Sheikh were the expensive players in the auction with the highest bid of Rs.175,000.

== Venues ==
Tribhuvan University International Cricket Ground was the host for all matches of the tournament

== Teams ==
Each team consisted of 15 players. 10 players were bought by each teams through auction. A talent hunt was conducted by each teams in their respective cities to acquire a young player in their squad. Similarly, the teams also included at least three foreign players in their team.

Bhairahawa Gladiators	Biratnagar Warriors	Chitwan Tigers	Kathmandu Kings XI	Lalitpur Patriots	Pokhara Rhinos
Sharad Vesawkar (c); Pradeep Airee; **Puneet Bisht**; Abinash Bohara; Bhuwan Karki; Krishna Karki; Prakash KC; **Puneet Mehra**; Rohit Paudel; Harishankar Shah; **Pratham Salunke**; Aarif Sheikh; Harjeet Singh; Dipesh Shrestha; Bhupendra Thapa; **Rahul Yadav**	Paras Khadka (c); **Sahan Adeesha**; Aakash Bista; Ramnaresh Giri; **Babar Hayat**; Avinash Karn; Dipesh Kandel; Karan K.C.; Pranit Thapa Magar; Sumit Maharjan; **Anshuman Rath**; Basant Regmi; Anil Sah; Aasif Sheikh; Puspa Thapa	Prithu Baskota (c); Dipendra Singh Airee; Kamal Singh Airee; Shahab Alam; Lalit Bhandari; Sunam Gautam; **Praveen Gupta**; Yogendra Singh Karki; **Shawej Khan**; **Parmesh Kumar**; Anil Mandal; Dilip Nath; Bhim Sharki; Sandeep Sunar; Aakash Thapa	**Farveez Maharoof** (c); Bikram Bhusal; Naresh Budhayer; **Akshu Fernando**; Sompal Kami; Sushil Kandel; **Sagar Kumar**; Siddhant Lohani; Jitendra Mukhiya; Sagar Pun; Raju Rijal; Amar Singh Routela; Samshad Sheikh; Amit Shrestha; Puran BK; Rahul Vishwakarma	Gyanendra Malla (c); Mehboob Alam; **Dipesh Bhandari**; **Suboth Bhati**; Kushal Bhurtel; Sumit Jha; Sundeep Jora; Rashid Khan; **Jaykishan Kolsawala**; Sandeep Lamichhane; **Yogesh Nagar**; **Sunny Patel**; Lalit Rajbanshi; Shankar Rana; Pawan Sarraf; Rajbir Singh; Sonu Tamang	Shakti Gauchan (c); **Asif Ali**; Binod Bhandari; Sushan Bhari; Santosh Bhatta; Sunil Dhamala; **Israrullah**; Saurabh Khanal; Bipin Khatri; Rajesh Pulami Magar; Kishor Mahato; Nurdhoj Sen; Dev Shah; Bikram Sob; **Taj Wali**

- Foreign players are listed in **bold**.
- Players selected from the talent hunt are listed in italics.

== Points table ==
Team	M	W	L	T	NR	Points	NRR
Biratnagar Warriors	5	5	0	0	0	10	1.235
Bhairahawa Gladiators	5	4	1	0	0	8	0.208
Lalitpur Patriots	5	2	3	0	0	4	0.128
Pokhara Rhinos	5	2	3	0	0	4	0.062
Kathmandu Kings XI	5	1	4	0	0	2	−0.682
Chitwan Tigers	5	1	4	0	0	2	−0.998

- The four top ranked teams will qualify for the playoffs
- advanced to Qualifier 1
- advanced to the Eliminator
- Eliminated

== League matches ==
=== Match 1 ===
18 December
11:00
Scorecard

Kathmandu Kings XI; 89/10 (18.3 overs)	v	Lalitpur Patriots; 90/3 (16.4 overs)
Amit Shrestha 27 (28); Suboth Bhati 4/15 (3.3 overs)		Jaykishan Kolsawala 44 (48)*; Akshu Fernando 2/19 (4 overs)

Patriots won by 7 wickets
TU Cricket Ground, Kirtipur
Umpires: Durga Subedi and Ram Yadav
Player of the match: Lalit Rajbanshi (Lalitpur Patriots)

- Lalitpur Patriots, elected to field first

=== Match 2 ===
19 December
09:00
Scorecard

Chitwan Tigers; 113/9 (20 overs)	v	Pokhara Rhinos; 116/0 (17.4 overs)
Dipendra Singh Airee 42 (32); Israrullah 4/22 (4 overs)		Israrullah 61 (52)*; Lalit Bhandari 0/12 (3 overs)

Rhinos won by 10 wickets
TU Cricket Ground, Kirtipur
Umpires: Himal Giri and Durga Subedi
Player of the match: Israrullah (Pokhara Rhinos)

- Pokhara Rhinos, elected to field first

=== Match 3 ===
19 December
12:45
Scorecard

Biratnagar Warriors; 150/6 (20 overs)	v	Lalitpur Patriots; 144/4 (20 overs)
Anil Sah 47 (35); Sandeep Lamichhane 2/29 (4 overs)		Pawan Sarraf 51 (47); Basant Regmi 1/17 (4 overs)

Warriors won by 6 runs
TU Cricket Ground, Kirtipur
Umpires: Sanjay Gurung (Nepal), Durga Subedi (Nepal)
Player of the match: Anil Sah (Biratnagar Warriors)

- Lalitpur Patriots, elected to field first

=== Match 4 ===
20 December
09:00
Scorecard

Pokhara Rhinos; 122/6 (20 overs)	v	Biratnagar Warriors; 123/7 (19.4 overs)
Rajesh Pulami Magar 30 (35); Paras Khadka 3/28 (4 overs)		Anshuman Rath 60(61); Israrullah 2/10 (4 overs)

Warriors won by 3 wickets
TU Cricket Ground, Kirtipur
Umpires: Adhip Pradhan and Ram Yadav
Player of the match: Anshuman Rath (Biratnagar Warriors)

- Biratnagar Warriors, elected to field first

=== Match 5 ===
20 December
12:45
Scorecard

Kathmandu Kings XI; 118/8 (20 overs)	v	Bhairahawa Gladiators; 121/3 (16.3 overs)
Amit Shrestha 29 (32); Dipesh Shrestha 3/16 (3 overs)		Puneet Bisht 42 (29)*; Amar Singh Routela 1/6 (1 over)

Gladiators won by 7 wickets
TU Cricket Ground, Kirtipur
Umpires: Sanjay Gurung and Vinay Kumar
Player of the match: Sharad Vesawkar (Bhairahawa Gladiators)

- Kathmandu Kings XI, elected to bat first

=== Match 6 ===
21 December
09:00
Scorecard

Lalitpur Patriots; 141/9 (20 overs)	v	Bhairahawa Gladiators; 145/6 (20 overs)
Yogesh Nagar 54 (33); Dipesh Shrestha 3/24 (4 overs)		Puneet Bisht 50 (38); Yogesh Nagar 2/31 (4 overs)

Gladiators won by 4 wickets
TU Cricket Ground, Kirtipur
Umpires: Himal Giri and Durga Subedi
Player of the match: Puneet Bisht (Bhairahawa Gladiators)

- Bhairahawa Gladiators, elected to field first

=== Match 7 ===
21 December
12:45
Scorecard

Chitwan Tigers; 142/7 (20 overs)	v	Kathmandu Kings XI; 143/7 (19.2 overs)
Dilip Nath 46 (40); Farveez Maharoof 3/21 (4 overs)		Farveez Maharoof 39 (33); Praveen Gupta 2/23 (4 overs)

Kings XI won by 3 wickets
TU Cricket Ground, Kirtipur
Umpires: Adhip Pradhan and Ram Yadav
Player of the match: Farveez Maharoof (Kathmandu Kings XI)

- Kathmandu Kings XI, elected to field first

=== Match 8 ===
22 December
09:00
Scorecard

Kathmandu Kings XI; 98/8 (20 overs)	v	Pokhara Rhinos; 102/4 (18.2 overs)
Sagar Pun 36 (47); Bikram Sob 2/11 (3 overs)		Israrullah 45 (48)*; Sagar Pun 2/19 (4 overs)

Rhinos won by 6 wickets
TU Cricket Ground, Kirtipur
Umpires: Sanjay Gurung and Hiralal Raut
Player of the match: Israrullah (Pokhara Rhinos)

- Pokhara Rhinos, elected to field first

=== Match 9 ===
22 December
12:45
Scorecard

Biratnagar Warriors; 174/8 (20 overs)	v	Chitwan Tigers; 103/10 (18.2 overs)
Babar Hayat 81 (42); Praveen Gupta 5/23 (4 overs)		Bhim Sharki 24 (20); Basant Regmi 4/11 (3.2 overs)

Warriors won by 71 runs
TU Cricket Ground, Kirtipur
Umpires: Vinay Kumar and Adhip Pradhan
Player of the match: Babar Hayat (Biratnagar Warriors)

- Chitawan Tigers, elected to field first

=== Match 10 ===
23 December
09:00
Scorecard

Biratnagar Warriors; 149/6 (20 overs)	v	Bhairahawa Gladiators; 114/10 (18.3 overs)
Anshuman Rath 57 (50); Harishankar Shah 3/35 (4 overs)		Pradeep Airee 18 (18); Avinash Karn 4/25 (4 overs)

Warriors won by 35 runs
TU Cricket Ground, Kirtipur
Umpires: Hiralal Raut, Vinay Kumar
Player of the match: Avinash Karn (Biratnagar Warriors)

- Bhairahawa Gladiators, elected to field first

=== Match 11 ===
23 December
12:45
Scorecard

Lalitpur Patriots; 130/10 (20.0 overs)	v	Chitwan Tigers; 132/5 (19.2 overs)
Shankar Rana 27(37); Yogendra S Karki 4/31 (4 overs)		Dipendra Singh Airee 55 (50); Sunny Patel 3/23 (4 overs)

Tigers won by 5 wickets
TU Cricket Ground, Kirtipur
Umpires: Sanjay Gurung and Buddhi Pradhan
Player of the match: Praveen Gupta (Chitwan Tigers)

- Lalitpur Patriots, elected to bat first

=== Match 12 ===
25 December
09:00
Scorecard

Biratnagar Warriors; 147/7 (20 overs)	v	Kathmandu Kings XI; 139/9 (20 overs)
Babar Hayat 67 (50); Sompal Kami 2/33 (4 overs)		Farveez Maharoof 42 (37); Anshuman Rath 3/19 (4 overs)

Warriors won by 8 runs
TU Cricket Ground, Kirtipur
Umpires: Vinay Kumar and Durga Subedi
Player of the match: Anshuman Rath (Biratnagar Warriors)

- Kathmandu Kings XI, elected to field first

=== Match 13 ===
25 December
12:45
Scorecard

Pokhara Rhinos; 108/10 (18.3 overs)	v	Bhairahawa Gladiators; 110/3 (17.4 overs)
Israrullah 41 (40); Dipesh Shrestha 2/14 (3.3 overs)		Aarif Sheikh 48 (47)*; Taj Wali 2/25 (3.2 overs)

Gladiators won by 7 wickets
TU Cricket Ground, Kirtipur
Umpires: Himal Giri and Buddhi Pradhan
Player of the match: Aarif Sheikh (Bhairahawa Gladiators)

- Pokhara Rhinos, elected to bat first

=== Match 14 ===
26 December
09:00
Scorecard

Chitwan Tigers; 87/9 (20 overs)	v	Bhairahawa Gladiators; 88/6 (18.3 overs)
Dipendra Singh Airee 15 (14); Sharad Vesawkar 3/12 (4 overs)		Puneet Mehra 30 (29); Shahab Alam 2/12 (4 overs)

Gladiators won by 4 wickets
TU Cricket Ground, Kirtipur
Umpires: Sanjay Gurung and Vinay Kumar
Player of the match: Sharad Vesawkar (Bhairahawa Gladiators)

- Bhairahawa Gladiators, elected to field first

=== Match 15 ===
26 December
12:45
Scorecard

Pokhara Rhinos; 132/5 (20 overs)	v	Lalitpur Patriots; 138/4 (20 overs)
Sunil Dhamala 70 (62)*; Dipesh Bhandari 1/26 (4 overs)		Jaykishan Kolsawala 56 (45); Israrullah 2/26 (4 overs)

Patriots won by 6 wickets
TU Cricket Ground, Kirtipur
Umpires: Buddhi Pradhan and Ram Yadav
Player of the match: Jaykishan Kolsawala (Lalitpur Patriots)

- Lalitpur Patriots, elected to field first

== Playoff stage ==
Preliminary
1	Biratnagar Warriors	131/2
2	Bhairahawa Gladiators	127/8
3	Lalitpur Patriots	138/5
4	Pokhara Rhinos	111/10

Preliminary
Q1L	Bhairahawa Gladiators	133/7
EW	Lalitpur Patriots	132/6

Final
Q1W	Biratnagar Warriors	149/7
Q2W	Bhairahawa Gladiators	148/9

=== Preliminary ===
==== Qualifier 1 ====
27 December
09:00
Scorecard

Bhairahawa Gladiators; 127/8 (20 overs)	v	Biratnagar Warriors; 131/2 (17 overs)
Puneet Mehra 49 (34); Sahan Adeesha 2/29 (4 overs)		Babar Hayat 62 (44); Harishankar Sah 1/23 (4 overs)

Warriors won by 8 wickets
TU Cricket Ground, Kirtipur
Umpires: Durga Subedi and Buddhi Pradhan
Player of the match: Babar Hayat (Biratnagar Warriors)

- Biratnagar Warriors, elected to field first

==== Eliminator ====
27 December
12:45
Scorecard

Lalitpur Patriots; 138/5 (20 overs)	v	Pokhara Rhinos; 111/10 (19.1 overs)
Sunny Patel 38 (26); Israrullah 3/14 (4 overs)		Israrullah 25 (22); Sandeep Lamichhane 3/27 (3 overs)

Patriots won by 27 runs
TU Cricket Ground, Kirtipur
Umpires: Sanjay Gurung and Vinay Kumar
Player of the match: Sunny Patel (Lalitpur Patriots)

- Lalitpur Patriots, elected to field first

==== Qualifier 2 ====
28 December
11:00
Scorecard

Lalitpur Patriots; 132/6 (20 overs)	v	Bhairahawa Gladiators; 133/7 (19.3 overs)
Jaykishan Kolsawala 42 (37); Puneet Mehra 2/28 (4 overs)		Pratham Salunke 32 (22); Lalit Rajbanshi 2/9 (4 overs)

Gladiators won by 3 wickets
TU Cricket Ground, Kirtipur
Umpires: Vinay Kumar and Buddhi Pradhan
Player of the match: Rohit Paudel (Bhairahawa Gladiators)

- Bhairahawa Gladiators, elected to field first

=== Final ===
30 December
11:00
Scorecard

Biratnagar Warriors; 149/7 (20 overs)	v	Bhairahawa Gladiators; 148/8 (20 overs)
Anshuman Rath 41 (41); Harishankar Sah 2/16 (4 overs)		Sharad Vesawkar 52 (39); Paras Khadka 3/18 (3.5 overs)

Warriors won by 1 run
TU Cricket Ground, Kirtipur
Umpires: Sanjay Gurung and Durga Subedi
Player of the match: Paras Khadka (Biratnagar Warriors)

- Biratnagar Warriors, elected to bat first

== Statistics ==
=== Most runs ===
Player	Team	Runs
Babar Hayat	Biratnagar Warriors	313
Anshuman Rath	Biratnagar Warriors	271
Jaykishan Kolsawala	Lalitpur Patriots	227
Israrullah	Pokhara Rhinos	196
Aarif Sheikh	Bhairahawa Gladiators	187

- Source: Cricinfo

=== Most wickets ===
Player	Team	Wickets
Israrullah	Pokhara Rhinos	12
Basant Regmi	Biratnagar Warriors	12
Praveen Gupta	Chitwan Tigers	10
Paras Khadka	Biratnagar Warriors	10
Harishankar Sah	Bhairahawa Gladiators	10

- Source: Cricinfo
