= 2018 Dhangadhi Premier League =

- Dates: 31 March 2018 – 14 April 2018
- Administrator(s): DCA; SPA
- Cricket format: Twenty20
- Tournament format(s): Round-robin and playoffs knockout
- Host: Nepal
- Champions: Team Chauraha Dhangadhi (2nd title)
- Participants: 6
- Matches: 19
- Player of the series: Rohan Mustafa (TCD) (198 runs and 9 wickets)
- Most runs: Gyanendra Malla (KG) (248 runs)
- Most wickets: Lalit Bhandari (TCD) (14 wickets)

2018 Dhangadhi Premier League (known as DPL2, for sponsorship reasons, Ruslan DPL 2) is the second season of Dhangadhi Premier League, a franchise Twenty20 cricket league in Nepal. The tournament started on 31 March and ended on 14 April in Dhangadhi. Team Chauraha Dhangadhi were the defending champions.

== Venue ==
Nepal
Dhangadhi
SSP Cricket Ground

== Teams and squads ==
The 2018 DPL features six team franchises. Kanchanpur Iconics were terminated and they were replaced by Mahendranagar United ahead of the season.

The player draft for the 2018 season was held in Kathmandu on 21 February 2018. 185 domestic players were divided into four different categories. The teams also had to sign two overseas players.

Biratnagar Kings	CYC Attariya	Kathmandu Goldens	Mahendranagar United	Rupandehi Challengers	Team Chauraha Dhangadhi
Paras Khadka (c); Basanta Regmi; Prithu Baskota; Subodh Ayer; Pawan Sarraf; Ramnaresh Giri; Saurabh Khanal; Puran BK; Avinash Bohara; Dilip Nath; Anil Kumar Sah; Manjeet Shrestha; Firtosh Ansari; Babar Hayat; Shubham Kamat	Subash Khakurel (c); Dipendra Singh Airee; Sagar Bhandari; Prem Tamang; Sandeep Jora; Kushal Bhurtel; Krishna Karki; Kamal Singh Airee; Binod Lama; Shuvankar Urao; Bhuwan KC; Aakash Thapa; Roman Bam; Gaurav Chitkara; Vipin Chand	Gyanendra Malla (c); Naresh Budhayer; Bikram Thagunna; Lalit Rajbanshi; Amit Shrestha; Santosh Bhatta; Kishor Mahato; Rashid Khan; Sanjay Shrestha; Shahab Alam; Pushpa Thapa; Bhupendra Thapa; Sanjay Basnet; ~~Jaykishan Kolsawala~~; Sunny Patel; Subodh Bhati	Binod Bhandari (c); Karan KC; Avinash Karn; Aarif Sheikh; Narayan Joshi; Pranit Thapa Magar; Hari Shankar Sah; Arun Airee; Bhuwan Karki; Asif Sheikh; Rohit Kumar Paudel; Robeen Chhetri; Dipendra Chand; Puneet Bisht; Puneet Mehra	Shakti Gauchan (c); Jitendra Mukhiya; Sagar Pun; Pradeep Airee; Prakash Jaisi; Kushal Malla; Bipin Khatri; Bikram Kumar Bhusal; Sonu Ansari; Sushan Bhari; Siddhant Lohani; Amar Singh Routela; Dipesh Shrestha; Sufyan Mehmood; Deepak Prasad	Sompal Kami (c); Rajesh Pulami Magar; Bijay Rana; Aashu Kandoi; Yogendra Singh Karki; Lalit Bhandari; Sonu Tamang; Shankar Rana; Rabindra Jung Shahi; Samsad Sheikh; Sunil Dhamala; Mahesh Adhikari; Raju Rijal; ~~Punit Mishra~~; Rohan Mustafa; Ashfaq Ahmed

== Format ==
=== Points table ===
Team	Pld	W	L	T	NR	Pts	NRR
Kathmandu Goldens (RU)	5	4	0	0	1	9	1.148
Team Chauraha Dhangadhi (W)	5	3	2	0	0	6	-0.051
Mahendranagar United (3rd)	5	2	1	0	2	6	0.461
CYC Attariya (5th)	5	2	2	0	1	5	1.283
Biratnagar Kings	5	2	3	0	0	4	0.204
Rupandehi Challengers	5	0	5	0	0	0	-2.648

- Top 4 teams qualified for the playoffs
- Advanced to Qualifier 1
- Advanced to Eliminator

=== League progression ===
	Group matches					Playoffs		
Team	1	2	3	4	5	QF1/E	QF2	Final
Kathmandu Goldens	2	4	6	8	9	L	W	L
Team Chauraha Dhangadhi	0	2	4	4	6	W		W
Mahendranagar United	2	2	4	5	6	W	L	
CYC Attariya	2	2	2	3	5	L		
Biratnagar Kings	0	2	4	4	4			
Rupandehi Challengers	0	0	0	0	0			

Win	Loss	Super-Over	No Result

== League stage ==
=== Match results ===
Match 1
31 March
13:00
Scorecard

Team Chauraha Dhangadhi; 145/6 (20 overs)	v	Kathmandu Goldens; 146/3 (18.4 overs)
Sunil Dhamala 68 (57); Shahab Alam 3/23 (4 overs)		Amit Shrestha 81 (65); Samsad Sheikh 2/21 (3 overs)

Kathmandu Goldens won by 7 wickets
SSP Cricket Ground, Dhangadhi
Umpires: Vinay Kumar Jha (Nepal) and Durga Subedi (Nepal)
Player of the match: Amit Shrestha (Kathmandu Goldens)

- Kathmandu Goldens won the toss and elected to field.
- Shahab Alam (Kathmandu Goldens) took a hat-trick.

Match 2
1 April
09:00
Scorecard

Rupandehi Challengers; 61 (15.2 overs)	v	CYC Attariya; 65/1 (7.3 overs)
Sufyan Mehmood 20* (25); Kamal Singh Airee 4/15 (4 overs)		Gaurav Chitkara 30 (13); Jitendra Mukhiya 1/16 (2 overs)

CYC Attariya won by 9 wickets
SSP Cricket Ground, Dhangadhi
Umpires: Mahesh Bohora (Nepal) and Vinay Kumar Jha (Nepal)
Player of the match: Kamal Singh Airee (CYC Attariya)

- Rupandehi Challengers won the toss and elected to bat.
- Rupandehi Challengers' score of 61 was the lowest total in the history of DPL.

Match 3
1 April
13:00
Scorecard

Mahendranagar United; 168/5 (20 overs)	v	Biratnagar Kings; 135 (19 overs)
Puneet Mehra 38 (18); Manjeet Shrestha 2/30 (4 overs)		Prithu Baskota 35 (39); Avinash Karn 3/22 (3 overs)

Mahendranagar United won by 33 runs
SSP Cricket Ground, Dhangadhi
Umpires: Buddhi Pradhan (Nepal) and Himal Giri (Nepal)
Player of the match: Puneet Mishra (Mahendranagar United)

- Mahendranagar United won the toss and elected to bat.

Match 4
2 April
09:00
Scorecard

Team Chauraha Dhangadhi; 151/7 (19.2 overs)	v	CYC Attariya; 150/8 (20 overs)
Rohan Mustafa 40 (42); Shuvankar Urao 2/12 (4 overs)		Vipin Chandra 28 (20); Lalit Bhandari 3/24 (4 overs)

Team Chauraha Dhangadhi won by 3 wickets
SSP Cricket Ground, Dhangadhi
Umpires: Durga Subedi (Nepal) and Buddhi Pradhan (Nepal)
Player of the match: Sompal Kami (Team Chauraha Dhangadhi)

- Team Chauraha Dhangadhi won the toss and elected to field.

Match 5
2 April
13:00
Scorecard

Rupandehi Challengers; 123 (18.4 overs)	v	Kathmandu Goldens; 186/4 (20 overs)
Pradeep Airee 57 (36); Rashid Khan 4/6 (2.4 overs)		Sunny Patel 48 (32); Bikram Bhushal 1/26 (3 overs)

Kathmandu Goldens won by 63 runs
SSP Cricket Ground, Dhangadhi
Umpires: Vinay Kumar Jha (Nepal) and Himal Giri (Nepal)
Player of the match: Sunny Patel (Kathmandu Goldens)

- Kathmandu Goldens won the toss and elected to bat.
- Kathmandu Goldens' score of 186 was the highest in the history of DPL

Match 6
3 April
10:00
Scorecard

Mahendranagar United; 131/8 (20 overs)	v	Team Chauraha Dhangadhi; 132/2 (18 overs)
Puneet Mehra 40 (25); Lalit Bhandari 4/37 (4 overs)		Sunil Dhamala 46 (47); Puneet Mehra 1/22 (4 overs)

Team Chauraha Dhangadhi won by 8 wickets
SSP Cricket Ground, Dhangadhi
Umpires: Buddhi Pradhan (Nepal) and Vinay Kumar Jha (Nepal)
Player of the match: Lalit Bhandari ([[Team Chauraha Dhangadhi]]

- Team Chauraha Dhangadhi won the toss and elected to field.

Match 7
4 April
09:00
Scorecard

Rupandehi Challengers; 139/7 (20 Overs)	v	Biratnagar Kings; 181/4 (20 overs)
Pradeep Airee 54 (50); Shubham Kamat 3/18 (4 Overs)		Babar Hayat 58 (35); Sufyan Mehmood 2/39 (4 overs)

Biratnagar Kings won by 42 runs
SSP Cricket Ground, Dhangadhi
Umpires: Mahesh Bohora (Nepal) and Durga Subedi (Nepal)
Player of the match: Babar Hayat (Biratnagar Kings)

- Rupandehi Challengers won the toss and elected to field.

Match 8
4 April
13:00
Scorecard

CYC Attariya; 126/8 (20 Overs)	v	Kathmandu Goldens; 137/9 (20 Overs)
Gaurav Chitkara 36 (26); Suboth Bhati 3/10 (4 Overs)		Gyanendra Malla 57 (43); Shuvankar Urao 3/19 (4 Overs)

Kathmandu Goldens won by 11 runs
SSP Cricket Ground, Dhangadhi
Umpires: Vinay Kumar (Nepal) and Hem Joshi (Nepal)
Player of the match: Suboth Bhati (Kathmandu Goldens)

- Kathmandu Goldens won the toss and elected to bat.

Match 9
5 April
09:00
Scorecard

Team Chauraha Dhangadhi; 109/9 (20 Overs)	v	Biratnagar Kings; 127 (19.5 overs)
Shankar Rana 25 (38); Pawan Sarraf 4/25 (4 Overs)		Pawan Sarraf 41 (34); Sunil Dhamala 4/10 (4 overs)

Biratnagar Kings won by 18 runs
SSP Cricket Ground, Dhangadhi
Umpires: Vinay Kumar Jha (Nepal) and Kamalesh Thakur (Nepal)
Player of the match: Pawan Sarraf (Biratnagar Kings)

- Team Chauraha Dhangadhi won the toss and elected to field.

Match 10
5 April
13:00
Scorecard

Rupandehi Challengers; 144/8 (20 Overs)	v	Mahendranagar United; 145/6 (18.5 Overs)
Pradeep Airee 39 (32); Punit Bista 4/12 (4 Overs)		Binod Bhandari 61 (48); Dipesh Shrestha 3/25 (4 Overs)

Mahendranagar United won by 4 wickets
SSP Cricket Ground, Dhangadhi
Umpires: Durga Subedi (Nepal) and Ram Pandey (Nepal)
Player of the match: Punit Bista (Mahendranagar United)

- Rupandehi Challengers won the toss and elected to bat.

Match 11
6 April
10:00
Scorecard

Biratnagar Kings; 164/8 (20 Overs)	v	Kathmandu Goldens; 170/5 (20 Overs)
Babar Hayat 67 (33); Lalit Rajbanshi 3/18 (4 Overs)		Gyanendra Malla 68* (40); Basanta Regmi 2/27 (4 Overs)

Kathmandu Goldens won by 5 wickets
SSP Cricket Ground, Dhangadhi
Umpires: Vinay Kumar Jha (Nepal) and Durga Subedi (Nepal)
Player of the match: Gyanendra Malla (Kathmandu Goldens)

- Biratnagar Kings won the toss and elected to bat

Match 12
7 April
09:00
Scorecard

Mahendranagar United	v	CYC Attariya

Match abandoned without a ball bowled
SSP Cricket Ground, Dhangadhi
Umpires: Kamalesh Thakur (Nepal) and Durga Subedi (Nepal)

- No toss.
- No play was possible due to wet outfield.

Match 13
7 April
13:00
Scorecard

Team Chauraha Dhangadhi; 76/7 (8 overs)	v	Rupandehi Challengers; 73/5 (8 overs)
Sonu Tamang 34 (14); Sushan Bhari 3/14 (2 overs)		Sagar Pun 33 (16); Rohan Mustafa 2/12 (2 overs)

Team Chauraha Dhangadhi won by 3 runs
SSP Cricket Ground, Dhangadhi
Umpires: Vinay Kumar Jha (Nepal) and Ram Pandey (Nepal)
Player of the match: Sonu Tamang (Team Chauraha Dhangadhi)

- Rupandehi Challengers won the toss and elected to field.
- Rain reduced play to 8 overs per side.

Match 14
8 April
09:00
Scorecard

Kathmandu Goldens	v	Mahendranagar United

Match abandoned with a ball bowled
SSP Cricket Ground, Dhangadhi
Umpires: Kamalesh Thakur (Nepal) and Ram Pandey (Nepal)

- No toss.
- No play was possible due to wet outfield.

Match 15
8 April
13:00
Scorecard

Biratnagar Kings; 55/3 (6 overs)	v	CYC Attariya; 56/4 (5.4 overs)
Dilip Nath 15 (9); Kamal Singh Airee 2/18 (2 overs)		Vipin Chandra 26 (13); Paras Khadka 2/14 (1.4 overs)

CYC Attariya won by 6 wickets
SSP Cricket Ground, Dhangadhi
Umpires: Vinay Kumar Jha (Nepal) and Durga Subedi (Nepal)
Player of the match: Vipin Chandra (CYC Attariya)

- CYC Attariya won the toss and elected to field.
- Rain reduced play to 6 overs per side.

== Play-offs ==
Preliminary
1	Kathmandu Goldens	127/9 (20 ov)
2	Team Chauraha Dhangadhi	128/9 (19.5 ov)
3	Mahendranagar United	130/7 (20 ov)
4	CYC Attariya	115/4 (20 ov)

Preliminary
Q1L	Kathmandu Goldens	143/5 (18.2 ov)
EW	Mahendranagar United	142/9 (20 ov)

Final
Q1W	Team Chauraha Dhangadhi	181/4 (20 ov)
Q2W	Kathmandu Goldens	160/8 (20 ov)

=== Preliminary ===
==== Qualifier 1 ====
Match 16
10 April
09:00
Scorecard

Kathmandu Goldens; 127/9 (20 overs)	v	Team Chauraha Dhangadhi; 128/9 (19.5 overs)
Gyanendra Malla 38 (23); Sompal Kami 2/21 (4 overs)		Rohan Mustafa 33 (20); Sunny Patel 2/30 (4 overs)

Team Chauraha Dhangadhi won by 1 wicket
SSP Cricket Ground, Dhangadhi
Umpires: Ram Pandey (Nepal) and Vinay Kumar Jha (Nepal)
Player of the match: Shankar Rana (Team Chauraha Dhangadhi)

- Team Chauraha Dhangadhi won the toss and elected to field.
- As a result of this match, Team Chauraha Dhangadhi advanced to the Final and Kathmandu Goldens qualified for Qualier 2.

==== Eliminator ====
Match 17
10 April
13:00
Scorecard

Mahendranagar United; 130/7 (20 overs)	v	CYC Attariya; 115/4 (20 overs)
Aarif Sheikh 35 (37); Kamal Singh Airee 2/16 (4 overs)		Subash Khakurel 30 (25); Robin Chhetri 2/16 (4 overs)

Mahendranagar United won by 15 runs
SSP Cricket Ground, Dhangadhi
Umpires: Durga Subedi (Nepal) and Kamalesh Thakur (Nepal)
Player of the match: Robin Chhetri (Mahendranagar United)

- CYC Attariya won the toss and elected to field.
- As a result of this match, Mahendranagar United advanced to Qualifier 2 and CYC Attariya are eliminated.

==== Qualifier 2 ====
Match 18
11-12 April
12:30
Scorecard

Kathmandu Goldens; 143/5 (18.2 overs)	v	Mahendranagar United; 142/9 (20 overs)
Suboth Bhati 52 (18); Puneet Mehra 2/15 (4 overs)		Puneet Mehra 58 (42); Sunny Patel 6/10 (4 overs)

Kathmandu Goldens won by 5 wickets
SSP Cricket Ground, Dhangadhi
Umpires: Durga Subedi (Nepal) and Vinay Kumar Jha (Nepal)
Player of the match: Sunny Patel (Kathmandu Goldens)

- Kathmandu Goldens won the toss and elected to field.
- Rain stopped play when 2 overs of the 1st innings were completed which caused the match to be rescheduled to begin on April 12 at 12:30.
- As a result of this match, Kathmandu Goldens advanced to the Final and Mahendranagar United were eliminated.

=== Final ===
Match 19
13 April
12:30
Scorecard

Team Chauraha Dhangadhi; 181/4 (20 overs)	v	Kathmandu Goldens; 160/8 (20 overs)
Sunil Dhamala 78 (63); Lalit Bhandari 3/22 (4 overs)		Amit Shrestha 58 (39); Suboth Bhati 2/17 (4 overs)

Team Chauraha Dhangadhi won by 21 runs
SSP Cricket Ground, Dhangadhi
Umpires: Vinay Kumar Jha (Nepal) and Durga Subedi (Nepal)
Player of the match: Rohan Mustafa (Team Chauraha Dhangadhi)

- Team Chauraha Dhangadhi won the toss and elected to bat.
- Team Chauraha Dhangadhi won the 2018 Dhangadhi Premier League.
- Team Chauraha Dhangadhi won their second title.

== Statistics ==
=== Most runs ===
Player	Team	Mat	Inns	NO	Runs	Ave	SR	HS	100	50	4s	6s
Gyanendra Malla	Kathmandu Goldens	8	7	1	248	41.33	131.91	68*	0	2	14	15
Amit Shrestha	Kathmandu Goldens	8	7	1	242	40.33	116.34	81*	0	2	25	10
Sunil Dhamala	Team Chauraha Dhangadhi	7	7	1	229	38.16	106.51	78	0	2	24	7
Rohan Mustafa	Team Chauraha Dhangadhi	6	6	0	198	33.00	121.47	60	0	1	10	11
Babar Hayat	Biratnagar Kings	5	5	0	186	37.50	200.00	67	0	2	12	17

Source: Cricinfo, as of 13 April 2018

=== Most wickets ===
Player	Team	Mat	Inns	Wkts	BBI	Avg	Econ	SR	4w	5w
Lalit Bhandari	Team Chauraha Dhangadhi	7	7	14	4/37	13.21	7.11	11.1	1	0
Sunny Patel	Kathmandu Goldens	8	8	13	6/10	10.00	4.48	13.3	0	1
Rashid Khan	Kathmandu Goldens	8	7	11	4/6	19.63	8.47	13.9	1	0
Shuvankar Urao	CYC Attariya	5	5	10	3/7	5.70	4.27	8.0	0	0
Kamal Singh Airee	CYC Attariya	5	5	9	4/15	12.33	6.93	10.6	0	0

Source: Cricinfo, as of 13 April 2018

=== Hat-tricks ===
Player	Team	Against	Date	Scorecard
Shahab Alam	Kathmandu Goldens	Team Chauraha Dhangadhi	31 March 2018	

== See also ==
- Home
- Everest Premier League
