= Nepal at the Men's T20 World Cup =

Nepal national team performance at T20 World Cup

The Nepal national cricket team is one of the associate members of the International Cricket Council (ICC) and are part of the ICC Asia. The team is administered by Cricket Association of Nepal, which became an associate member in 1988. They made their Twenty20 International (T20I) debut in 2014 against Hong Kong.

This is a record of Nepal's results at the Men's T20 World Cup. Nepal made their tournament debut in 2014 after finishing third in the 2013 Qualifier. They returned to the tournament in 2024, ten years after their first appearance, but were eliminated in the group stage on both occasions, winning two matches in their debut campaign. Nepal qualified again for the 2026 edition, where they were eliminated in the group stage. During the tournament, they secured a victory over Scotland, their first T20 World Cup win since 2014. In three appearances, they have 3 wins from 11 matches.

== T20 World Cup record ==
Men's T20 World Cup record										Qualification record (Note: WCL Division One served as the qualifier for the 2007 edition.)				
Year	Round	Position	Pld	W	L	T	NR	Ab (Note: Abandoned matches are not counted in the official records.)	Captain	Pld	W	L	T	NR
(South Africa) 2007	Not eligible; no ODI status									Not eligible				
(England) 2009	Not eligible; no ODI status									Not eligible				
(Cricket West Indies) 2010	Not eligible; no ODI status									Not eligible				
(Sri Lanka) 2012	Did not qualify									15	8	7	0	0
(Bangladesh) 2014	First stage	12/16	3	2	1	0	0	0	Paras Khadka	16	10	6	0	0
(India) 2016	Did not qualify									6	1	4	0	0
(United Arab Emirates) (Oman) 2021	Did not qualify									10	7	2	0	1
(Australia) 2022	Did not qualify									5	4	1	0	0
(United States) (Cricket West Indies) 2024	Group stage	17/20	4	0	3	0	0	1	Rohit Paudel	5	3	1	1	0
(India) (Sri Lanka) 2026	Group stage	16/20	4	1	3	0	0	0	Rohit Paudel	6	6	0	0	0
Total	0 Titles	3/10	11	3	7	0	0	1	—N/a	63	39	21	1	2

=== Record by opponents ===
Opponent	M	W	L	T+W	T+L	NR	Ab	Win %	First played
Afghanistan	1	1	0	0	0	0	0	100	2014
Bangladesh	2	0	2	0	0	0	0	0.00	2014
England	1	0	1	0	0	0	0	0.00	2026
Hong Kong	1	1	0	0	0	0	0	100	2014
Italy	1	0	1	0	0	0	0	0.00	2026
Netherlands	1	0	1	0	0	0	0	0.00	2024
Scotland	1	1	0	0	0	0	0	100	2026
South Africa	1	0	1	0	0	0	0	0.00	2024
Sri Lanka	1	0	0	0	0	0	1	—	2024
West Indies	1	0	1	0	0	0	0	0.00	2026
Total	11	3	7	0	0	0	1	30.00	—
Last Updated: 17 February 2026 | Source: ESPNcricinfo

== Tournament results ==
=== 2014 World Cup ===
Squad and kit

- Paras Khadka (c)
- Gyanendra Malla
- Anil Mandal
- Sagar Pun
- Sharad Vesawkar
- Pradeep Airee (wk)
- Binod Bhandari (wk)
- Subash Khakurel (wk)
- Naresh Budayair
- Sompal Kami
- Amrit Bhattarai
- Shakti Gauchan
- Jitendra Mukhiya
- Basant Regmi
- Avinash Karn
- Rahul Vishwakarma
- Prithu Baskota

2014 kit

Results

First stage (Group A)				Super 10		Semifinal	Final	Overall Result
Opposition Result	Opposition Result	Opposition Result	Rank	Opposition Result	Rank	Opposition Result	Opposition Result	Overall Result
Hong Kong; Won by 80 runs	Bangladesh; Lost by 8 wickets	Afghanistan; Won by 9 runs	2	Did not advance				First stage
Source: Cricbuzz

Scorecards

First stage (Group A)

16 March
Scorecard

Nepal; 149/8 (20 overs)	v	Hong Kong; 69 (17 overs)
Gyanendra Malla 48 (41); Haseeb Amjad 3/25 (4 overs)		Babar Hayat 20 (25); Shakti Gauchan 3/9 (4 overs)

Nepal won by 80 runs
Zohur Ahmed Chowdhury Stadium, Chittagong

18 March
Scorecard

Nepal; 126/5 (20 overs)	v	Bangladesh; 132/2 (15.3 overs)
Paras Khadka 41 (35); Al-Amin Hossain 2/17 (4 overs)		Anamul Haque 42 (33); Basant Regmi 1/14 (3 overs)

Bangladesh won by 8 wickets
Zohur Ahmed Chowdhury Stadium, Chittagong

20 March
Scorecard

Nepal; 141/5 (20 overs)	v	Afghanistan; 132/8 (20 overs)
Subash Khakurel 56 (53); Shapoor Zadran 2/19 (4 overs)		Asghar Afghan 49 (36); Jitendra Mukhiya 3/18 (4 overs)

Nepal won by 9 runs
Zohur Ahmed Chowdhury Stadium, Chittagong

=== 2024 World Cup ===
Squad and kit

- Rohit Paudel (c)
- Aasif Sheikh (wk)
- Anil Kumar Sah (wk)
- Kushal Bhurtel
- Kushal Malla
- Dipendra Singh Airee
- Sundeep Jora
- Gulshan Jha
- Karan KC
- Sompal Kami
- Pratis GC
- Abinash Bohara
- Sagar Dhakal
- Kamal Airee
- Sandeep Lamichhane
- Lalit Rajbanshi

2024 kit

Results

Group stage (Group D)					Super 8		Semifinal	Final	Overall Result
Opposition Result	Opposition Result	Opposition Result	Opposition Result	Rank	Opposition Result	Rank	Opposition Result	Opposition Result	Overall Result
Netherlands; Lost by 6 wickets	Sri Lanka; Match abandoned	South Africa; Lost by 1 run	Bangladesh; Lost by 21 runs	5	Did not advance				First stage
Source: ESPNcricinfo

Scorecards

Group stage (Group D)

4 June 2024
10:30 UTC−5
Scorecard

Nepal; 106 (19.2 overs)	v	Netherlands; 109/4 (18.4 overs)
Rohit Paudel 35 (37); Logan van Beek 3/18 (3.2 overs)		Max O'Dowd 54* (48); Dipendra Singh Airee 1/6 (2 overs)

Netherlands won by 6 wickets
Grand Prairie Stadium, Dallas
Umpires: Langton Rusere (Zim) and Rod Tucker (Aus)
Player of the match: Tim Pringle (Ned)

- Netherlands won the toss and elected to field.

11 June 2024
19:30 UTC−4 (N)
Scorecard

Nepal	v	Sri Lanka

Match abandoned
Central Broward Park, Lauderhill
Umpires: Chris Gaffaney (NZ) and Richard Kettleborough (Eng)

- No toss.
- No play was possible due to rain.

14 June 2024
19:30 UTC−4 (N)
Scorecard

South Africa; 115/7 (20 overs)	v	Nepal; 114/7 (20 overs)
Reeza Hendricks 43 (49); Kushal Bhurtel 4/19 (4 overs)		Aasif Sheikh 42 (49); Tabraiz Shamsi 4/19 (4 overs)

South Africa won by 1 run
Arnos Vale Stadium, Kingstown
Umpires: Jayaraman Madanagopal (Ind) and Joel Wilson (WI)
Player of the match: Tabraiz Shamsi (SA)

- Nepal won the toss and elected to field.
- Nepal were eliminated as a result of this match.

16 June 2024
19:30 UTC−4 (N)
Scorecard

Bangladesh; 106 (19.3 overs)	v	Nepal; 85 (19.2 overs)
Shakib Al Hasan 17 (22); Sompal Kami 2/10 (3 overs)		Kushal Malla 27 (40); Tanzim Hasan Sakib 4/7 (4 overs)

Bangladesh won by 21 runs
Arnos Vale Stadium, Kingstown
Umpires: Sam Nogajski (Aus) and Ahsan Raza (Pak)
Player of the match: Tanzim Hasan Sakib (Ban)

- Nepal won the toss and elected to field.
- Sandeep Lamichhane (Nep) took his 100th wicket in T20Is.

=== 2026 World Cup ===
Squad and kit

- Rohit Paudel (c)
- Dipendra Singh Airee (vc)
- Aasif Sheikh (wk)
- Aarif Sheikh
- Kushal Bhurtel
- Sher Malla
- Basir Ahamad
- Gulshan Jha
- Karan KC
- Sompal Kami
- Lokesh Bam
- Nandan Yadav
- Sandeep Lamichhane
- Lalit Rajbanshi

2026 kit

Results

Group stage (Group C)					Super 8		Semifinal	Final	Overall Result
Opposition Result	Opposition Result	Opposition Result	Opposition Result	Rank	Opposition Result	Rank	Opposition Result	Opposition Result	Overall Result
England; Lost by 4 runs	Italy; Lost by 10 wickets	West Indies; Lost by 9 wickets	Scotland; Won by 7 wickets	4	Did not advance				Group stage
Source: ESPNcricinfo

Scorecards

Group stage (Group C)

Match 5
8 February 2026
15:00 UTC+5:30 (D/N)
Scorecard

England; 184/7 (20 overs)	v	Nepal; 180/6 (20 overs)
Jacob Bethell 55 (35); Dipendra Singh Airee 2/23 (3 overs)		Dipendra Singh Airee 44 (29); Liam Dawson 2/21 (4 overs)

England won by 4 runs
Wankhede Stadium, Mumbai
Attendance: 19,369
Umpires: Leslie Reifer (WI) and Rod Tucker (Aus)
Player of the match: Will Jacks (Eng)

- England won the toss and elected to bat.
- This was the first time England and Nepal faced each other in T20Is.
- Sher Malla (Nep) made his T20I debut. He became the second Nepali player and the 30th player overall to take a wicket with his first ball in T20Is.
- Dipendra Singh Airee (Nep) became the first Nepali cricketer to score 2,000 runs in T20Is.
- This was Nepal's highest-ever innings total in the T20 World Cup (180).

Match 17
12 February 2026
15:00 UTC+5:30 (D/N)
Scorecard

Nepal; 123 (19.3 overs)	v	Italy; 124/0 (12.4 overs)
Aarif Sheikh 27 (24); Crishan Kalugamage 3/18 (4 overs)		Anthony Mosca 62* (32)

Italy won by 10 wickets
Wankhede Stadium, Mumbai
Umpires: Donovan Koch (Aus) and Sam Nogajski (Aus)
Player of the match: Crishan Kalugamage (Ita)

- Italy won the toss and elected to field.
- This was the first time Italy and Nepal faced each other in T20Is.
- This was the first World Cup match victory for Italy across all formats.
- This was Italy's first 10-wicket win in T20Is and the eighth overall in T20 World Cups.

Match 25
15 February 2026
11:00 UTC+5:30
Scorecard

Nepal; 133/8 (20 overs)	v	West Indies; 134/1 (15.2 overs)
Dipendra Singh Airee 58 (47); Jason Holder 4/27 (4 overs)		Shai Hope 61* (44); Nandan Yadav 1/24 (3 overs)

West Indies won by 9 wickets
Wankhede Stadium, Mumbai
Attendance: 19,225
Umpires: Gazi Sohel (Ban) and Alex Wharf (Eng)
Player of the match: Jason Holder (WI)

- West Indies won the toss and elected to field.
- West Indies qualified for the Super 8 while Nepal were eliminated as a result of this match.

Match 33
17 February 2026
19:00 UTC+5:30 (N)
Scorecard

Scotland; 170/7 (20 overs)	v	Nepal; 171/3 (19.2 overs)
Michael Jones 71 (45); Sompal Kami 3/25 (4 overs)		Dipendra Singh Airee 50* (23); Michael Leask 3/30 (4 overs)

Nepal won by 7 wickets
Wankhede Stadium, Mumbai
Attendance: 18,920
Umpires: K. N. Ananthapadmanabhan (Ind) and Alex Wharf (Eng)
Player of the match: Dipendra Singh Airee (Nep)

- Nepal won the toss and elected to field.
- This was Nepal's first win in a T20 World Cup match after 12 years.

== Records and statistics ==
=== Team records ===
Highest innings totals
Score	Opponent	Venue	Result	Season
180/6 (20 overs)	England	Mumbai	Lost	2026
171/3 (19.2 overs)	Scotland	Mumbai	Won	2026
149/8 (20 overs)	Hong Kong	Chittagong	Won	2014
141/5 (20 overs)	Afghanistan	Chittagong	Won	2014
133/8 (20 overs)	West Indies	Mumbai	Lost	2026
Last updated: 19 February 2026

=== Most appearances ===
This list consists players with most number of matches at the Men's T20 World Cup. Sompal Kami is the only player to have featured in all the three editions and has played a total of 8 matches. Rohit Paudel has captained the team in the most number of matches(7).

Most matches
Matches	Player	Period
8	Sompal Kami	2014–2026
7	Aasif Sheikh	2024–2026
7	Dipendra Singh Airee	2024–2026
7	Kushal Bhurtel	2024–2026
7	Gulshan Jha	2024–2026
7	Rohit Paudel	2024–2026
Last updated: 17 February 2026

=== Batting records ===
Most runs
Runs	Player	Mat	Inn	Avg	100s	50s	Period
201	Dipendra Singh Airee	7	7	33.50	—N/a	2	2024–2026
134	Aasif Sheikh	7	7	19.14	—N/a	—N/a	2024–2026
119	Rohit Paudel	7	7	17.00	—N/a	—N/a	2024–2026
102	Kushal Bhurtel	7	7	14.57	—N/a	—N/a	2024–2026
91	Sharad Vesawkar	3	3	30.33	—N/a	—N/a	2014–2014
Last updated: 17 February 2026

Highest individual innings
Score	Player	Opponent	Venue	Year
58	Dipendra Singh Airee	West Indies	Wankhede	2026
56	Subash Khakurel	Afghanistan	Chattogram	2014
50*	Dipendra Singh Airee	Scotland	Wankhede	2026
48	Gyanendra Malla	Hong Kong	Chattogram	2014
44	Dipendra Singh Airee	England	Wankhede	2026
Last updated: 17 February 2026

Most fifties
Fifties	Player	Period
2	Dipendra Singh Airee	2024–2026
1	Subash Khakurel	2014–2014
Last updated: 17 February 2026

=== Bowling records ===
Most wickets
Wickets	Player	Matches	Avg.	Econ.	4W	5W	Period
10	Sompal Kami	8	14.80	6.16	0	0	2014–2026
8	Dipendra Singh Airee	7	17.25	6.13	0	0	2024–2026
5	Basant Regmi	3	11.20	5.60	0	0	2014–2014
5	Shakti Gauchan	3	14.80	6.72	0	0	2014–2014
5	Kushal Bhurtel	7	30.20	7.55	1	0	2024–2026
5	Nandan Yadav	4	19.00	8.63	0	0	2026–2026
Last updated: 17 February 2026

Best innings figures
Player	Bowling figures	Opponent	Venue	Year
Kushal Bhurtel	4/19 (4 overs)	South Africa	Kingstown	2024
Shakti Gauchan	3/9 (4 overs)	Hong Kong	Chattogram	2014
Basant Regmi	3/14 (4 overs)	Hong Kong	Chattogram	2014
Jitendra Mukhiya	3/18 (4 overs)	Afghanistan	Chattogram	2014
Sompal Kami	3/21 (4 overs)	Scotland	Wankhede	2026
Last updated: 17 February 2026

=== Partnership records ===
Highest partnerships by runs
Runs	Players	Opposition	Venue	Season
85 (4th wicket)	Sharad Vesawkar & Paras Khadka	v Bangladesh	Chattogram	2014
82 (3rd wicket)	Rohit Paudel & Dipendra Singh Airee	v England	Wankhede	2026
80 (3rd wicket)	Gyanendra Malla & Paras Khadka	v Hong Kong	Chattogram	2014
76 (4th wicket)	Sharad Vesawkar & Subash Khakurel	v Afghanistan	Chattogram	2014
74 (1st wicket)	Kushal Bhurtel & Aasif Sheikh	v Scotland	Wankhede	2026
Last updated: 17 February 2026

=== Wicket-keeping records ===
Most dismissals
Dismissals	Player	Matches	Cat.	St.	Period
4	Aasif Sheikh	4	3	1	2024–2026
1	Binod Bhandari	3	1	0	2014–2014
1	Subash Khakurel	3	1	0	2014–2014
Last updated: 17 February 2026

=== Fielding records ===
Most catches
Catches	Player	Matches	Period
3	Paras Khadka	3	2014–2014
3	Sandeep Lamichhane	6	2024–2026
3	Dipendra Singh Airee	7	2024–2026
3	Sompal Kami	8	2014–2026
2	Sundeep Jora	2	2024–2026
2	Sagar Pun	3	2014–2014
2	Anil Sah	3	2024–2024
Last updated: 17 February 2026
