= 2018 MCC Tri-Nation Series =

- Date: 29 July 2018
- Location: England
- Result: Nepal and Netherlands shared the series
Teams
MCC	Nepal	Netherlands
Captains
Mahela Jayawardene	Paras Khadka	Pieter Seelaar
Most runs
Varun Chopra (27)	Subash Khakurel (16)	Tobias Visée (69)
Most wickets
Mark Watt (1) Alasdair Evans (1) Daniel Douthwaite (1) Matt Coles (1)	Sompal Kami (3)	Fred Klaassen (1); Michael Rippon (1)

2018 MCC Tri-nation series was a cricket tournament that was held on 29 July 2018 at Lord's in England. The series featured Nepal, Netherlands and Marylebone Cricket Club (MCC), with the matches played as Twenty20 fixtures. The third fixture, between Nepal and the Netherlands, was given full Twenty20 International (T20I) status by the International Cricket Council (ICC).

Rain affected all three matches. The first two fixtures were both reduced to six overs per side. In the third and final match, only 16.4 overs of play was possible, with the game ending in a no result. Nepal and the Netherlands shared the series.

== Squads ==
MCC	Nepal	Netherlands
Mahela Jayawardene (c); Kashif Ali; Ian Bell; Dylan Budge; Varun Chopra; Matt Coles; Nick Compton; Daniel Douthwaite; Alasdair Evans; James Foster (wk); Dominic Manthorpe; Peter Moor; Ben Sears; Tom Smith; Jonathan Trott; Mark Watt	Paras Khadka (c); Dipendra Singh Airee; Lalit Bhandari; Shakti Gauchan; Karan KC; Sompal Kami; Subash Khakurel (wk); Sandeep Lamichhane; Gyanendra Malla; Rohit Paudel; Lalit Rajbanshi; Basanta Regmi; Anil Sah; Aarif Sheikh; Sharad Vesawkar	Pieter Seelaar (c); Wesley Barresi; Ryan ten Doeschate; Scott Edwards (wk); Clayton Floyd; Fred Klaassen; Bas de Leede; Paul van Meekeren; Max O'Dowd; Hidde Overdijk; Michael Rippon; Shane Snater; Antonius Staal; Tobias Visée

== Points table ==
Team	P	W	L	T	NR	Pts	NRR
Nepal	2	1	0	0	1	3	+2.652
Netherlands	2	1	0	0	1	3	+1.667
MCC	2	0	2	0	0	0	–2.365

== T20 series ==
=== 1st T20 ===
29 July 2018
10:00
Scorecard

Netherlands; 72/3 (6 overs)	v	MCC; 62/2 (6 overs)
Tobias Visée 58* (23); Mark Watt 1/9 (1 over)		Varun Chopra 27* (17); Fred Klaassen 1/12 (2 overs)

Netherlands won by 10 runs
Lord's, London
Umpires: Ben Debenham (Eng) and Allan Haggo (Sco)

- Marylebone Cricket Club won the toss and elected to field.
- The match was reduced to 6 overs per side due to rain.
- Kashif Ali, Daniel Douthwaite (MCC), Hidde Overdijk and Antonius Staal (Ned) all made their T20 debuts.

=== 2nd T20 ===
29 July 2018
13:05
Scorecard

MCC; 40/4 (6 overs)	v	Nepal; 41/1 (4.4 overs)
Mahela Jayawardene 24* (16); Sompal Kami 2/8 (2 over)		Subash Khakurel 16* (15); Daniel Douthwaite 1/7 (1 over)

Nepal won by 9 wickets
Lord's, London
Umpires: Ben Debenham (Eng) and Allan Haggo (Sco)

- Nepal won the toss and elected to field.
- The match was reduced to 6 overs per side due to rain.
- Tom Smith (MCC), Lalit Bhandari, Rohit Paudel, Anil Sah and Aarif Sheikh (Nep) all made their T20 debuts.

=== 3rd T20 ===
29 July 2018
16:20
Scorecard

Netherlands; 174/4 (16.4 overs)	v	Nepal
Wesley Barresi 44 (24); Karan KC 1/17 (1.4 overs)

No result
Lord's, London
Umpires: Rizwan Akram (Ned) and Allan Haggo (Sco)

- Nepal won the toss and elected to field.
- No further play was possible due to rain.
- This was a full T20I match.
- Dipendra Singh Airee, Lalit Rajbanshi, Anil Sah, Aarif Sheikh (Nep) and Hidde Overdijk (Ned) all made their T20I debuts.
- Sandeep Lamichhane made his T20I debut for Nepal. He had previously made his T20I debut for the ICC Rest of the World XI team in the Hurricane Relief T20 Challenge match in May 2018.
