= Puneet =

Puneet is an Indian male given name and it may refer to

- Puneet Beniwal, Indian actor
- Puneet Bisht, Indian cricketer
- Puneet Datey, Indian cricketer
- Puneet Issar, Indian actor
- Puneet Mehra, Indian cricketer
- Puneet Nath Datt, Indian army officer
- Puneet Rajkumar, Indian actor and singer
- Puneet Singh Ratn, Indian actor
- Puneet Sira, film director

== See also ==
- Punita Arora, Indian Navy officer
