= Sunaula Hazar Din =

"Sunaula Hazar Din" (English: Golden 1000 days) is a campaign run by Government of Nepal in collaboration with UNICEF. According to UNICEF, The "Golden 1000 days" refers to the period from conception to the child's second birthday, encompassing approximately 270 days of pregnancy and 730 days after birth. The goals of the campaign are to help fight against the malnutrition seen on newly born child, as well as helping with mothers. This campaign was launched in 2014 by Aamir Khan and Paras Khadka.

== Finances and goals ==
The project started as a grant and loan combination of 40 million provided by the World Bank to fight poverty and child mortality in Nepal. According to statistics by the Nepali government at the beginning of the project two out of every five children in that country were malnourished and will suffer health consequences for the rest of their lives because of it. The Sunaula Hazar Din project aimed to halt this by focusing on child development for the first two years of life. This expedition has taken an objective of reducing malnutrition and Infant mortality rate not only via variation in dish and food but also through awareness in cleanliness.
