= Nepalese cricket team in the Netherlands in 2018 =

International cricket tour

	Netherlands	Nepal
- Dates: 1 – 3 August 2018
Captains	Pieter Seelaar	Paras Khadka

One Day International series
- Results: 2-match series drawn 1–1
Most runs	Wesley Barresi (83)	Gyanendra Malla (64)
Most wickets	Fred Klaassen (6)	Paras Khadka (5)

The Nepalese cricket team toured the Netherlands in August 2018 to play two One Day Internationals (ODIs) matches against the Dutch cricket team. They were the first ODI matches to be played by Nepal since they were awarded ODI status by the International Cricket Council (ICC) during the 2018 Cricket World Cup Qualifier. It was the first ODI series to be played in the Netherlands since 2013, when South Africa played a one-off match, and the first ODI matches to be played by the Netherlands since the 2014 Cricket World Cup Qualifier tournament.

In July 2018, the Koninklijke Nederlandse Cricket Bond (KNCB) confirmed the venues for the two matches. Later the same month, Nepal's Shakti Gauchan announced that he would be retiring from international cricket at the conclusion of the series. He played in the first match of the series before retiring.

The Netherlands won the first ODI by 55 runs, with Michael Rippon named the man of the match. Along with Nepal's starting eleven all making their ODI debuts in the match, five players in the Netherlands' squad also made their debuts in the format. Nepal won the second match by one run, to record their first win in ODIs, and therefore drawing the series 1–1. Following the win, Nepal's captain Paras Khadka said it felt great and that it "shows a lot of character within the team".

== Squads ==
Netherlands	Nepal
Pieter Seelaar (c); Wesley Barresi; Daniel ter Braak; Ben Cooper; Scott Edwards (wk); Fred Klaassen; Bas de Leede; Paul van Meekeren; Stephan Myburgh; Max O'Dowd; Hidde Overdijk; Michael Rippon; Shane Snater	Paras Khadka (c); Dipendra Singh Airee; Lalit Bhandari; Shakti Gauchan; Karan KC; Sompal Kami; Subash Khakurel (wk); Sandeep Lamichhane; Gyanendra Malla; Rohit Paudel; Lalit Rajbanshi; Basanta Regmi; Anil Sah; Aarif Sheikh; Sharad Vesawkar

== ODI Series ==
=== 1st ODI ===
1 August 2018
11:00
Scorecard

Netherlands; 189 (47.4 overs)	v	Nepal; 134 (41.5 overs)
Michael Rippon 51 (76); Paras Khadka 4/26 (10 overs)		Gyanendra Malla 51 (61); Pieter Seelaar 3/20 (9 overs)

Netherlands won by 55 runs
VRA Cricket Ground, Amstelveen
Umpires: Rizwan Akram (Ned) and Sarika Prasad (Sin)
Player of the match: Michael Rippon (Ned)

- Netherlands won the toss and elected to bat.
- Bas de Leede, Scott Edwards, Fred Klaassen, Shane Snater, Daniel ter Braak, (Ned), Dipendra Singh Airee, Shakti Gauchan, Sompal Kami, Karan KC, Paras Khadka, Sandeep Lamichhane, Gyanendra Malla, Basanta Regmi, Anil Sah, Aarif Sheikh and Sharad Vesawkar (Nep) all made their ODI debuts.

=== 2nd ODI ===
3 August 2018
11:00
Scorecard

Nepal; 216 (48.5 overs)	v	Netherlands; 215 (50 overs)
Sompal Kami 61 (46); Fred Klaassen 3/38 (10 overs)		Wesley Barresi 71 (89); Sandeep Lamichhane 3/41 (10 overs)

Nepal won by 1 run
VRA Cricket Ground, Amstelveen
Umpires: Huub Jansen (Ned) and Sarika Prasad (Sin)
Player of the match: Sompal Kami (Nep)

- Nepal won the toss and elected to bat.
- Lalit Bhandari, Subash Khakurel and Rohit Paudel (Nep) all made their ODI debuts.
- Rohit Paudel (Nep), at the age of 15 years and 335 days, became the fourth-youngest player to make his debut in an ODI.
