= Hidde Overdijk =

Dutch cricketer (born 1996)

Personal information
- Full name: Hidde C Overdijk
- Born: 29 April 1996 (age 30); The Hague, Netherlands
- Batting: Right-handed
- Bowling: Right-arm medium

International information
- National side: Netherlands
- T20I debut (cap 43): 29 July 2018 v Nepal
- Last T20I: 8 August 2019 v UAE

Career statistics
Competition	T20I	T20
Matches	4	5
Runs scored	13	13
Batting average	13.00	13.00
100s/50s	0/0	0/0
Top score	13	13
Balls bowled	48	54
Wickets	3	3
Bowling average	24.00	26.33
5 wickets in innings	0	0
10 wickets in match	0	0
Best bowling	2/23	2/23
Catches/stumpings	2/–	2/–
- Source: Cricinfo, 28 September 2020

Hidde C Overdijk (born 29 April 1996) is a Dutch cricketer. He made his Twenty20 debut for the Netherlands in the 2018 MCC Tri-Nation Series against the Marylebone Cricket Club on 29 July 2018. He made his Twenty20 International (T20I) on the same day, against Nepal. Earlier in the same month, he was named in the Netherlands' One Day International (ODI) squad for their series against Nepal, but he did not play.
