= Tom Smith (cricketer, born 1996) =

English cricketer

Personal information
- Full name: Thomas Frederik Smith
- Born: 21 May 1996 (age 30); Bristol, England
- Batting: Right-handed
- Bowling: Right-arm off break

Domestic team information
- Years: Team
- 2016: Glamorgan
- Only LA: 15 July 2016 Glamorgan v Pakistan A
- Only T20: 29 July 2018 MCC v Nepal

Career statistics
Competition	List A	T20
Matches	1	1
Runs scored	6	–
Batting average	6.00	–
100s/50s	0/0	–
Top score	6	–
Balls bowled	–	6
Wickets	–	0
Bowling average	–	–
5 wickets in innings	–	–
10 wickets in match	–	–
Best bowling	–	–
Catches/stumpings	3/–	0/–
- Source: Cricinfo, 16 August 2018

Thomas Frederik Smith (born 21 May 1996) is an English cricketer who played for Glamorgan. Primarily a right-handed batsman, he also bowls right-arm off break. He made his Twenty20 debut for the Marylebone Cricket Club in the 2018 MCC Tri-Nation Series against Nepal on 29 July 2018.
