= Rahul Yadav (cricketer) =

Indian cricketer (born 1989)

Personal information
- Born: 15 January 1989 (age 37); Ghaziabad, Uttar Pradesh, India

Domestic team information
- Years: Team
- 2009–2018: Delhi
- 2009–2010: Kolkata Knight Riders
- Source: Cricinfo, 12 April 2016

Rahul Yadav (born 15 January 1989) is an Indian cricketer. He played first-class cricket for Delhi. He was also a member of Kolkata Knight Riders squad in IPL 2009. He was appointed Arunachal Pradesh Cricket Association under 19 team coach.
