= Praveen Gupta =

Indian cricketer (born 1986)

Personal information
- Born: 8 December 1986 (age 39); Meerut, Uttar Pradesh, India
- Nickname: Raju
- Batting: Left-handed
- Bowling: Slow left-arm
- Role: Bowler

Domestic team information
- Years: Team
- 2003–present: Uttar Pradesh
- 2023: Manipal Tigers

Career statistics
Competition	FC	LA	T20
Matches	53	39	12
Runs scored	841	193	27
Batting average	16.17	11.35	5.40
100s/50s	0/3	0/0	0/0
Top score	74	29	10
Balls bowled	9591	1734	246
Wickets	122	46	11
Bowling average	33,09	26.43	29.36
5 wickets in innings	3	0	0
10 wickets in match	0	0	0
Best bowling	5/11	4/18	2/23
Catches/stumpings	19/–	9/–	1/–
- Source: Cricinfo, 19 August 2025

Praveen Gupta (born 8 December 1986) is an Indian first-class cricketer who plays for Uttar Pradesh. A slow left-arm bowler, he has played cricket across all three formats of the game for Uttar Pradesh and Manipal Tigers.

== Career ==
Gupta first played for Uttar Pradesh at Under-16 level during the 2000–01 season, featuring in the Central Zone league and knockout stages, and playing in the final against Delhi Under 16s at Eden Gardens in January 2001.

In early 2003, Gupta represented Central Zone Under-19s in the Vinoo Mankad Trophy. Soon after, he made both his first-class and List A debut in the same season. The following year, in 2004, Gupta was selected in the India squad for the ICC Under-19 Cricket World Cup in Bangladesh, alongside players such as Ambati Rayudu, Dinesh Karthik, Suresh Raina and others. Across the event he claimed 11 wickets in seven innings at an average of 14.72, finishing among India's leading wicket-takers as the team reached the semi-finals. He later played in the CK Nayudu Trophy for Uttar Pradesh in the 2005–06 and 2006–07 seasons, bridging into senior domestic cricket.

He made his Twenty20 debut for Uttar Pradesh against Railways on October 20, 2009. Gupta joined Manipal Tigers in the 2023 season of the Legends Cricket League (LLC), aiding them to emerge as LLC Champions. As of 2025, he has continued to play domestic cricket for Uttar Pradesh. He has also joined Central Delhi Kings in the Delhi Premier League as a coach and team mentor.
