= Sandeep Lamichhane =

Nepalese cricketer

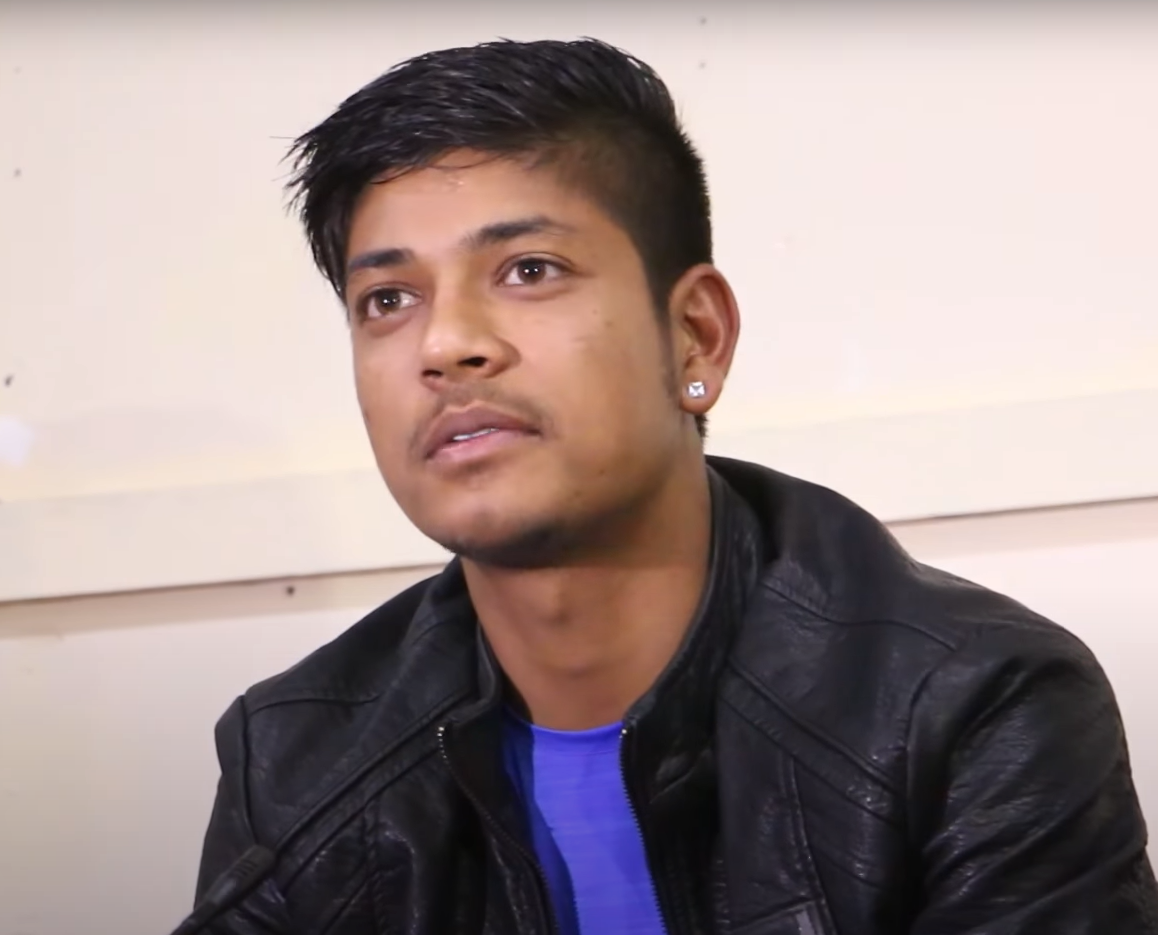

Personal information
- Full name: Sandeep Lamichhane
- Born: 2 August 2000 (age 26); Aruchaur, Syangja, Nepal
- Batting: Right-handed
- Bowling: Leg break

International information
- National sides: Nepal (2018–present); World XI (2018)
- ODI debut (cap 6): 1 August 2018; Nepal v Netherlands
- Last ODI: 5 May 2026; Nepal v Oman
- T20I debut (cap 20): 31 May 2018; World XI v West Indies
- Last T20I: 21 April 2026; Nepal v UAE

Domestic team information
- Years: Team
- 2018–2020: Delhi Capitals
- 2018: St Kitts & Nevis Patriots
- 2018: Nangarhar Leopards
- 2018/19-2019/20: Melbourne Stars
- 2019: Sylhet Sixers
- 2019: Lahore Qalandars
- 2019: Barbados Tridents
- 2020: Jamaica Tallawahs
- 2020/21–2022: Hobart Hurricanes
- 2024–present: Biratnagar Kings
- 2026–present: Rajshahi Warriors
- 2026–present: Jaffna Kings

Career statistics
Competition	ODI	T20I	LA	T20
Matches	74	77	98	173
Runs scored	500	86	540	154
Batting average	13.88	6.14	12.55	6.69
100s/50s	0/0	0/0	0/0	0/0
Top score	49	16*	49	16*
Balls bowled	4063	1744	5327	3840
Wickets	154	141	200	254
Bowling average	19.25	12.52	19.23	16.69
5 wickets in innings	3	2	4	2
10 wickets in match	0	0	0	0
Best bowling	6/11	5/9	6/11	5/9
Catches/stumpings	11/–	27/–	21/–	39/–
- Source: Cricinfo, 7 June 2026

Sandeep Lamichhane (Nepali: सन्दीप लामिछाने, Nepali pronunciation: [sʌndip lamit͡sʰane]; born 2 August 2000) is a Nepalese international cricketer, and current ODI captain of the Nepal national cricket team.

A right-arm leg spin bowler, Lamichhane has played for Twenty20 franchise teams around the world, including the Delhi Capitals in the Indian Premier League (IPL), the Hobart Hurricanes in the Big Bash League (BBL), and the Lahore Qalandars in the Pakistan Super League (PSL). In the Bangladesh Premier League, he previously represented the Sylhet Sixers in 2019 and was signed by the Rajshahi Warriors for the 2025–26 season. He is Nepal's highest wicket taker in ODIs and Twenty20 Internationals (T20Is).

Lamichhane made his T20I debut against the West Indies, where he represented a World XI team. He became the first cricketer to make a T20I debut representing a combined team. Lamichhane was one of the eleven cricketers to play in Nepal's first One Day International (ODI) match, against the Netherlands, in August 2018. In December 2021, Lamichhane was named the captain of Nepal national cricket team by Cricket Association of Nepal (CAN), replacing Gyanendra Malla.

== Early and personal life ==
Lamichhane moved to Chitwan district and started training at Chitwan Cricket Academy, which is run by former captain Raju Khadka. During a visit by the captain, Paras Khadka, and coach of Nepal Pubudu Dasanayake, Lamichhane was asked to bowl in the nets and was selected for the national under-19 training camp. It was Dasanayake who first spotted Lamichhane's talent when he was a 14 year old.

Lamichhane is also a singer and uploads his songs and music videos on his YouTube channel. In July 2018, Lamichhane released his first song Udash thiyo from the album Pratikshya – The waiting.

== Early career ==
Lamichhane made his List A cricket debut in the 2015–17 ICC World Cricket League Championship on 16 April 2016 against Namibia. Prior to his List A debut, he was named in Nepal's under-19 squad for the 2016 Under-19 Cricket World Cup. In their second match against the Ireland under-19 team, he took a hat-trick with his leg-break bowling. He was adjudged man of the match for his figures of 5/27.

He finished the tournament as second highest wicket taker with 14 wickets at an average of 17.07 and a strike rate of 21.9.

He was recruited by former English-born Hong Kong cricketer Scott McKechnie to play for the Kowloon Cantons franchise in the inaugural edition of the Hong Kong T20 Blitz on 2016. Scott was impressed with the youngster's performance during the MCC tour of Nepal in November 2016 where Scott himself was undone by his spin twice in the same match and it prompted Scott McKechnie to scout for Lamichhane for the 2016 Hong Kong Blitz competition. Lamichhane ended up picking seven wickets in the three matches against the touring Marylebone Cricket Club.

The Hong Kong T20 Blitz in fact, went onto become a breakout tournament for Lamichhane himself and it ultimately turned out to be meteoric rise for him in his young days as he was discovered for his bowling display and even went onto share dressing room with World Cup winning captain Michael Clarke during the course of the tournament.

In September 2016, Lamichhane received a letter from former Australian captain Michael Clarke, inviting him to play at the Sydney-based Western Suburbs District Cricket Club. In the 2017 ACC Under-19 Asia Cup, he took bowling figures of 5/8 which restricted Malaysia under-19s to a total of 45 and was named the man of the match. he play for Bagmati province

== T20 franchise cricket ==
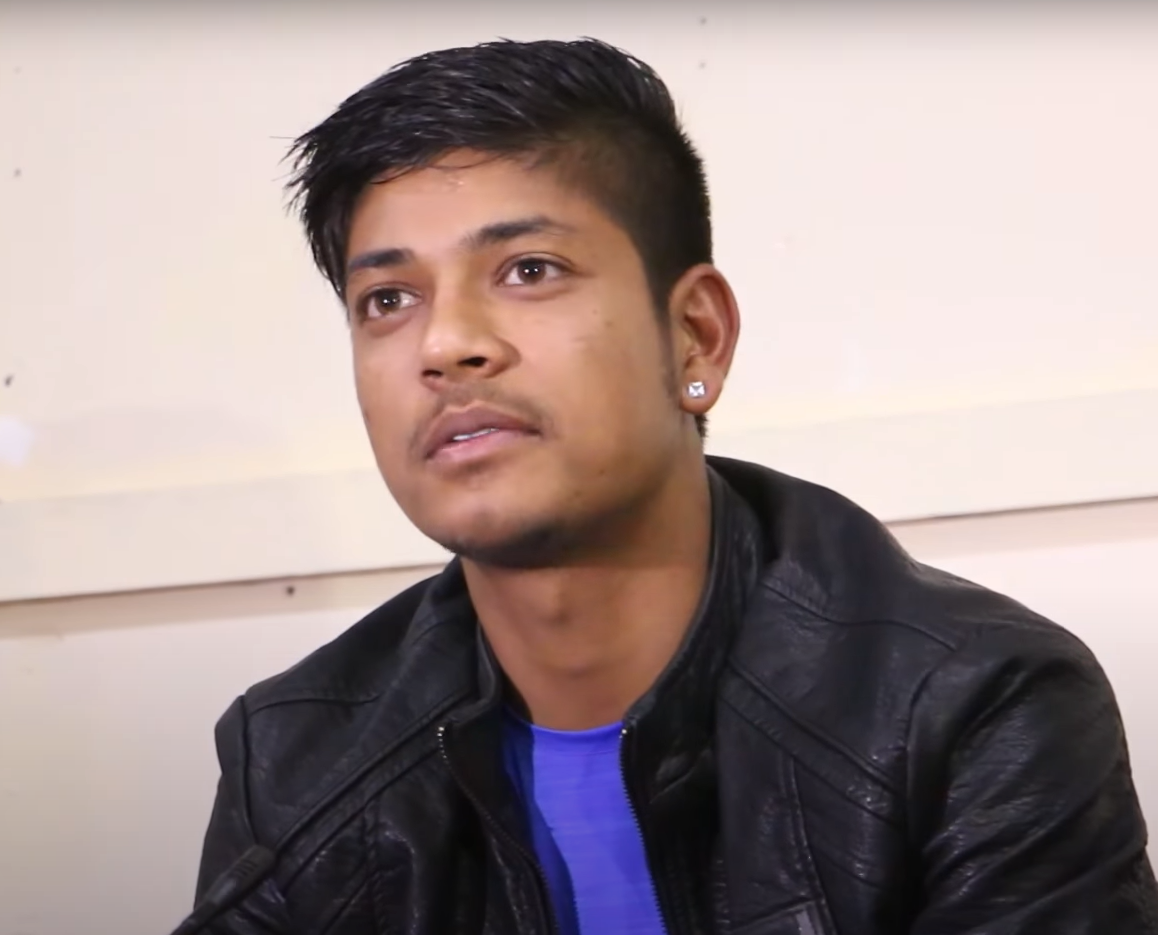
Lamichhane in 2018 during an interview.

In January 2018, Lamichhane was included in the list of players for auction in the 2018 Indian Premier League (IPL). He was bought by Delhi Daredevils and became the first Nepalese cricketer to get a contract in the IPL. Indian Prime minister Narendra Modi commented that the relationship between India and Nepal had been strengthened because of the signing.

In March 2018, he was drafted to play for the St Kitts and Nevis Patriots in the 2018 Caribbean Premier League, and became the first player from Nepal to be selected in the Caribbean Premier League.

In May 2018, Lamichhane made his senior Twenty20 debut for the Delhi Capitals in the Indian Premier League, becoming the first Nepalese cricketer to play in the IPL. He took a wicket for 25 runs on his debut match against Royal Challengers Bangalore. In the tournament, he took five wickets in three matches with a bowling average of 16.40.

In June 2018, Lamichane was selected to play for the Montreal Tigers in the inaugural edition of the Global T20 Canada tournament. In the tournament he took eight wickets in five matches at an average of 19.62. In September 2018, he was named in Nangarhar's squad in the first edition of the Afghanistan Premier League tournament, going on to play in one match in the tournament.

In October 2018, he was signed by the Melbourne Stars for the Big Bash League (BBL), becoming the first cricketer from Nepal to play in the BBL. Later the same month, he was named in the squad for Sylhet Sixers, following the draft for the 2018–19 Bangladesh Premier League. In November 2018, Lamichhane was named in Lahore Qalandars's squad in the fourth edition of the Pakistan Super League. In March 2019, he was named as one of eight players to watch by the International Cricket Council (ICC) ahead of the 2019 Indian Premier League tournament. The following month, Lamichhane said he recognised the huge learning curve of playing in the IPL and that it had "changed his life".

In June 2019, he was selected to play for the Toronto Nationals franchise team in the 2019 Global T20 Canada tournament. In July 2020, he was named in the Jamaica Tallawahs squad for the 2020 Caribbean Premier League. In November 2020, he was signed by the Hobart Hurricanes for the 2020–21 Big Bash League. In March 2021, Lamichhane was signed by Worcestershire to play in the 2021 t20 Blast in England. However, in June 2021, he was denied a work visa for the United Kingdom and was released by Worcestershire. He was also set to play in the inaugural edition of The Hundred in 2021 but he missed out owing to visa issues and was subsequently replaced by Tabraiz Shamsi. In July 2022, he was signed by the Dambulla Giants for the third edition of the Lanka Premier League.

== International career ==
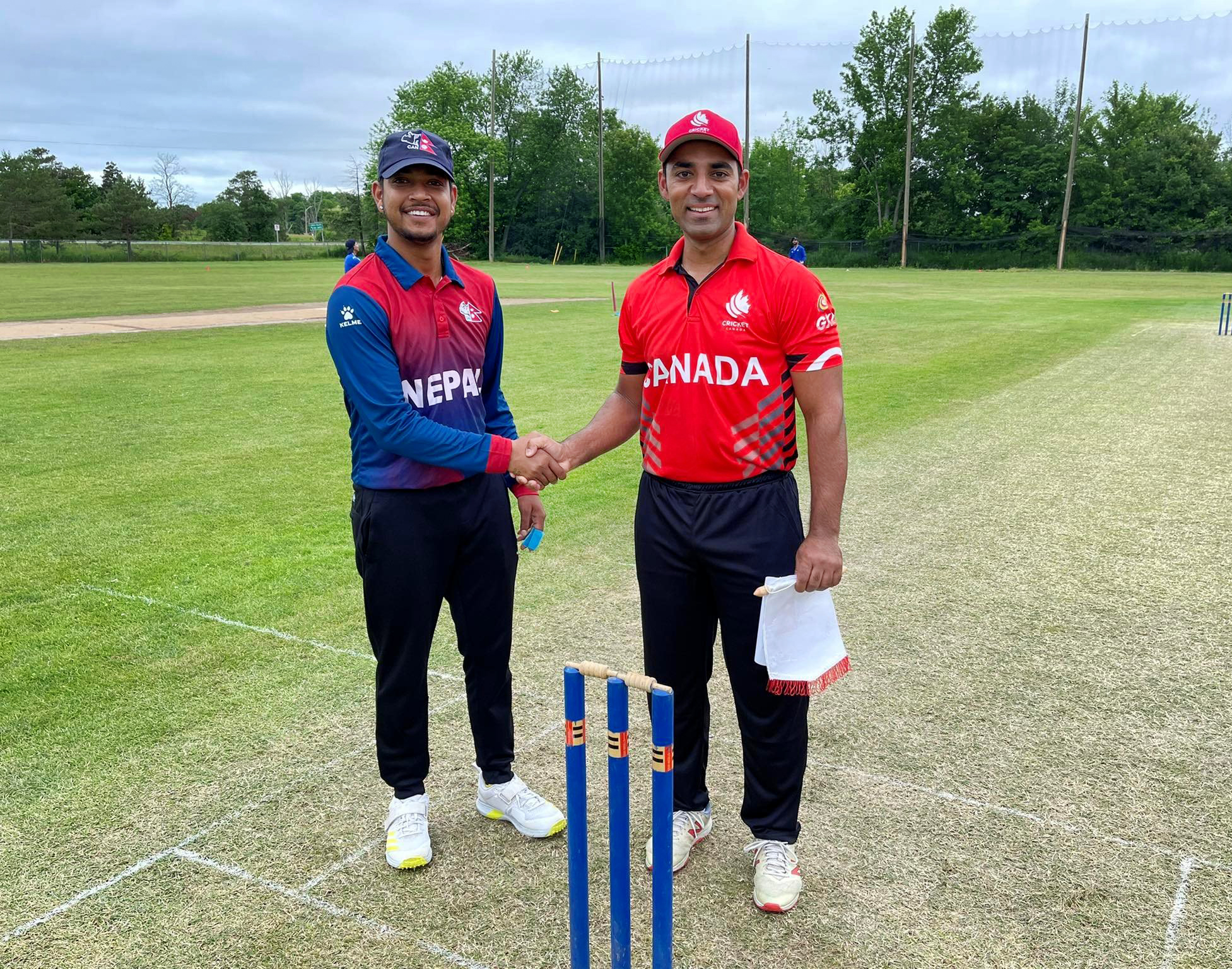
Lamichhane with Saad Bin Zafar during the toss, 2022

In January 2018, Lamichhane was named in Nepal's squad for the 2018 ICC World Cricket League Division Two tournament. In their opening match against Namibia, he was adjudged man of the match with bowling figures of 4/18 in 8.2 overs. He also shared a crucial final wicket partnership of 18 runs with Basanta Regmi to win the match by one wicket. In the third match against the United Arab Emirates, he took 3/30 to help reduce the opponent to 114 runs. In the fourth match against Kenya, he took his first five wicket haul in List A cricket, with 5/20, and was again named the man of the match.

Lamichhane was awarded with ICC World Cricket League Division Two Player of the tournament award as a result of his economical bowling and took the most wickets in the tournament, taking 17 wickets in six matches.

In February 2018, the International Cricket Council (ICC) named Lamichhane as one of the ten players to watch ahead of the 2018 Cricket World Cup Qualifier tournament. Following the conclusion of the tournament, the ICC went on to name Lamichhane as the rising star of Nepal's squad.

In May 2018, he was added to the ICC Rest of the World XI team, for the Hurricane Relief T20 Challenge against the West Indies at Lord's. He made his T20I debut in the match.

In July 2018, he was named in Nepal's squad for their ODI series against the Netherlands. These were Nepal's first ODI matches after gaining ODI status during the 2018 Cricket World Cup Qualifier. Ahead of the matches, the ICC named him as the key player for Nepal. He made his T20I debut for Nepal in July in the third match of the 2018 MCC Tri-Nation Series, against the Netherlands. He made his ODI debut for Nepal against the Netherlands on 1 August 2018.

In August 2018, he was named in Nepal's squad for the 2018 Asia Cup Qualifier tournament. In October 2018, he was named in Nepal's squad in the Eastern sub-region group for the 2018–19 ICC World Twenty20 Asia Qualifier tournament. He was the leading wicket-taker during the tournament, with 24 dismissals in six matches.

In June 2019, he was named in Nepal's squad for the Regional Finals of the 2018–19 ICC T20 World Cup Asia Qualifier tournament. He made his first-class debut on 6 November 2019, for Nepal against the Marylebone Cricket Club (MCC), during the MCC's tour of Nepal. On 12 February 2020, in the match against the United States in the 2020 Nepal Tri-Nation Series, Lamichhane took his first five-wicket haul in an ODI match. His career best figures of 6/16 restricted USA to joint lowest ever total in ODI history for 35. On 29 February 2020, in the match against Malaysia in the Eastern Region group of the 2020 Asia Cup Qualifier, Lamichhane became the first bowler for Nepal to take 100 wickets in Twenty20 cricket. In September 2020, he was one of eighteen cricketers to be awarded with a central contract by the Cricket Association of Nepal.

On 11 October 2021, Lamichhane was named the ICC Player of the Month by the International Cricket Council.

In December 2021, Lamichhane was announced as the new captain of the Nepal national team by the Cricket Association of Nepal (CAN) after Gyanendra Malla was sacked, along with former vice-captain Dipendra Singh Airee, over disciplinary issues.

In April 2023, Lamichhane became the fastest bowler to complete 100 One Day International wickets in terms of matches (42).

In May 2023, he was player of the series in the 2023 ACC Men's Premier Cup.

In October 2023, he decided to rest for the Nepal Tri-nation T20I tournament hosted by Nepal, citing personal reasons, as per the secretary of CAN Paras Khadka.

In January 2026, Lamichhane was named in Nepal's squad for 2026 T20I World Cup.

== Records and milestones ==
ODI

- Fastest to 150 ODI wickets in terms of innings – 73.
- Fastest to 100 ODI wickets in terms of innings – 42.
- 2nd fastest to 50 ODI wickets in terms of innings – 22.

T20I

- Second fastest bowler to take 100 wickets – 54.

== Honours ==
- NNIPA Best Youth Player of the Year: 2017
- NCCS-CPAN Cricketer of the Year: 2018
- ICC Men's Player of the Month – September 2021

== Controversy ==
In September 2022, an 18-year-old woman lodged a police complaint against Sandeep Lamichhane, accusing him of rape. He was arrested in October 2022 upon returning to Nepal. In December 2023, the Kathmandu District Court found him guilty, and in January 2024 he was sentenced to eight years in prison along with a fine of NPR 300,000 and compensation of NPR 200,000 to the victim.

On appeal to a higher court, the Patan High Court acquitted him of the rape charges in May 2024.
