= Lalit Bhandari =

Nepalese cricketer

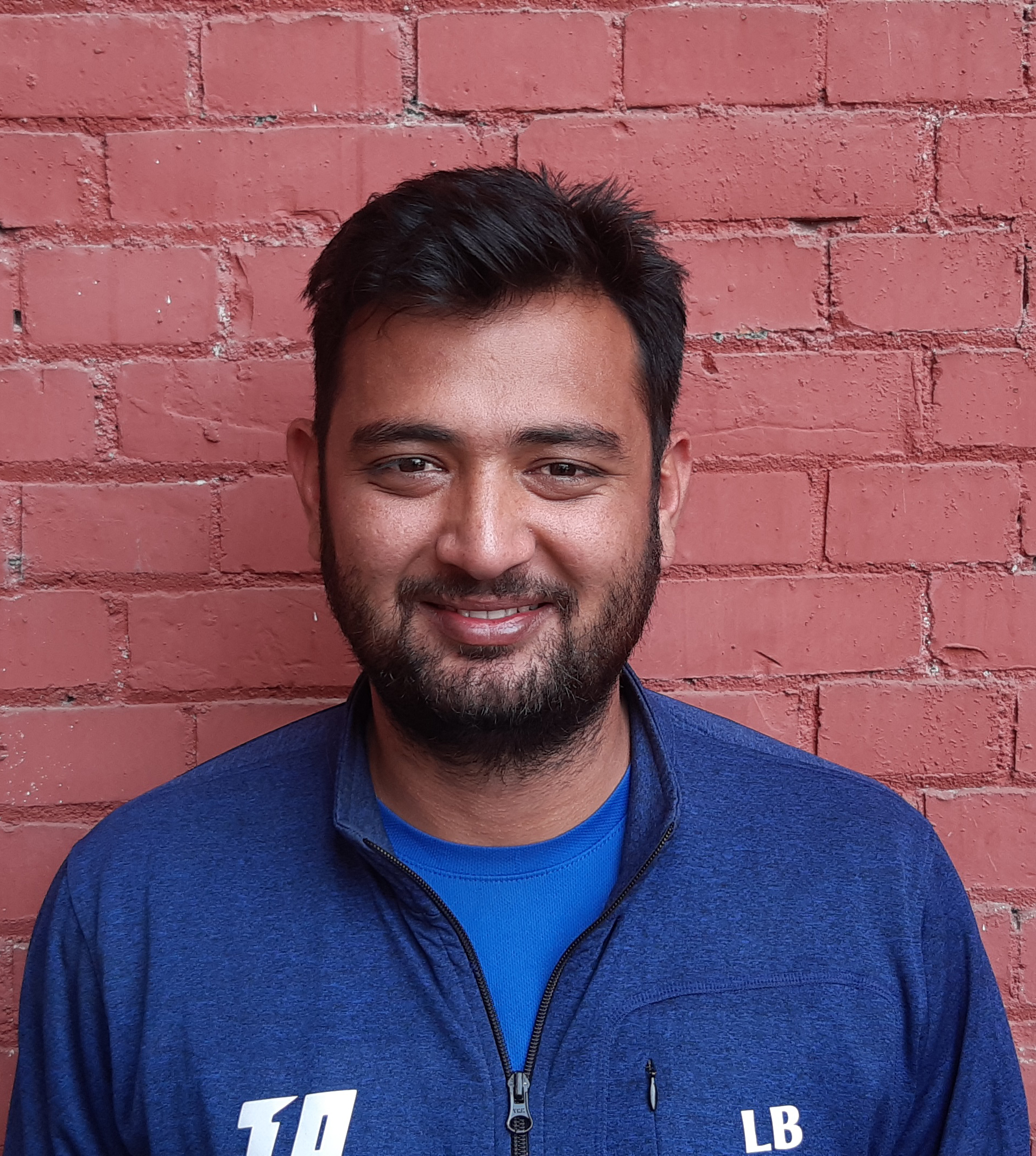

Personal information
- Full name: Lalit Singh Bhandari
- Born: 22 July 1996 (age 30); Kanchanpur, Nepal
- Batting: Left-handed
- Bowling: Left-arm medium
- Role: Bowler

International information
- National side: Nepal (2017–present)
- Only ODI (cap 12): 3 August 2018 v Netherlands

Career statistics
| Competition | List A |
|---|---|
| Matches | 2 |
| Runs scored | 0 |
| Batting average | – |
| 100s/50s | 0/0 |
| Top score | 0* |
| Balls bowled | 108 |
| Wickets | 1 |
| Bowling average | 77.00 |
| 5 wickets in innings | 0 |
| 10 wickets in match | 0 |
| Best bowling | 1/29 |
| Catches/stumpings | 0/– |
- Source: Cricinfo, 3 August 2018

Lalit Bhandari (born 22 July 1996) is a Nepalese cricketer. He made his List A debut for Nepal against the United Arab Emirates in the 2015–17 ICC World Cricket League Championship on 6 December 2017. In January 2018, he was named in Nepal's squad for the 2018 ICC World Cricket League Division Two tournament.

In July 2018, he was named in Nepal's squad for their One Day International (ODI) series against the Netherlands. These were Nepal's first ODI matches since gaining ODI status during the 2018 Cricket World Cup Qualifier. He made his Twenty20 debut for Nepal in the 2018 MCC Tri-Nation Series against the Marylebone Cricket Club on 29 July 2018. He made his ODI debut for Nepal against the Netherlands on 3 August 2018.

In August 2018, he was named in Nepal's squad for the 2018 Asia Cup Qualifier tournament. In October 2018, he was named in Nepal's squad in the Eastern sub-region group for the 2018–19 ICC World Twenty20 Asia Qualifier tournament.

In September 2020, Bhandari was injured in a motorbike accident. He was taken to a nearby hospital with non-life-threatening injuries, and was discharged early the following month.
