= Gyanendra Malla =

Nepalese coach and former cricketer

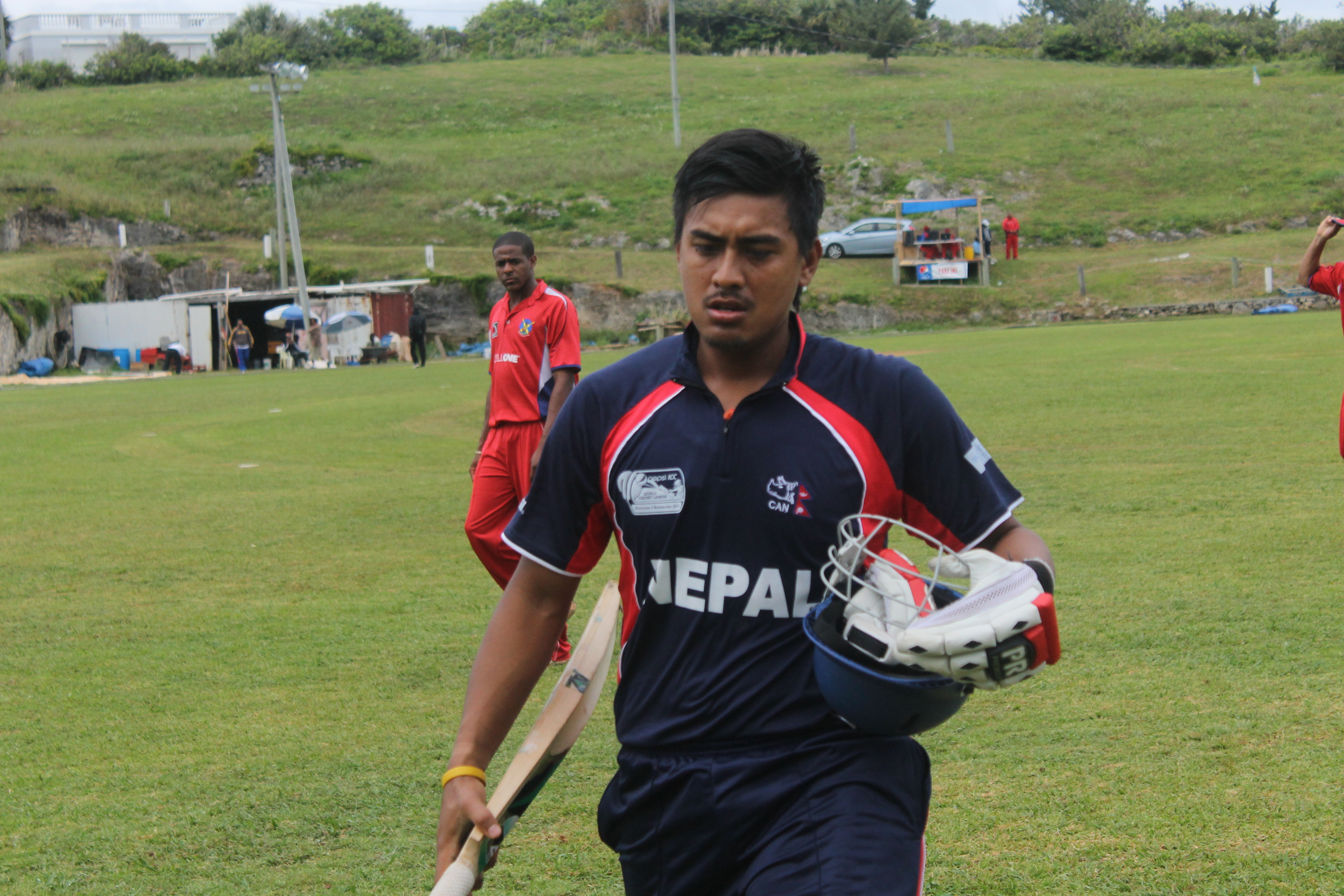
- Malla during 2013

Personal information
- Born: 16 September 1990 (age 36); Nepal
- Nickname: Gyanu
- Height: 5 ft 9 in (1.75 m)
- Batting: Right-handed
- Bowling: Right-arm leg spin
- Role: Batsman; occasional Wicket-keeper

International information
- National side: Nepal (2006–2023)
- ODI debut (cap 2): 1 August 2018 v Netherlands
- Last ODI: 4 July 2023 v Ireland
- T20I debut (cap 2): 16 March 2009 v Hong Kong
- Last T20I: 30 August 2022 v Kenya

Domestic team information
- Years: Team
- 2011–2015: APF (National League)
- 2014–2014: Colors X-Factors (NPL)
- 2013–2013: Ontario Cricket Academy & Club
- 2017-2021: Lalitpur Patriots
- 2017: Armed Police Force Club
- 2019-2023: Bagmati Province

Head coaching information
- Years: Team
- 2024–present: Nepal A
- 2024–present: Karnali Yaks
- 2025–present: Nepal

Career statistics
Competition	ODI	T20I	LA	T20
Matches	37	45	77	68
Runs scored	876	883	1,802	1,267
Batting average	24.33	23.23	24.68	22.62
100s/50s	0/7	1/2	0/11	1/3
Top score	75	107	91*	107
Balls bowled	18	–	18	–
Wickets	1	–	1	–
Bowling average	18.00	–	18.00	–
5 wickets in innings	0	–	0	–
10 wickets in match	0	–	0	–
Best bowling	1/6	–	1/6	–
Catches/stumpings	13/–	23/–	28/2	31/5
Medal record
Representing Nepal
Men's Cricket
South Asian Games
Bronze medal – third place	2019 Kathmandu/Pokhara	Team
- Source: Cricinfo, 23 April 2025

Gyanendra Malla (Nepali: ज्ञानेन्द्र मल्‍ल; born 16 September 1990) is a Nepalese politician, cricket coach and former captain of the Nepal national cricket team, currently serving as head coach of Nepal A team. He was a right-handed batsman and an occasional wicket-keeper. He made his debut against Namibia in March 2006. He was one of the cricketers who played in Nepal's first One Day International (ODI) match, against the Netherlands, in August 2018.

Malla became the seventh Nepalese cricketer to score an international century, when he slammed 114 off 125 balls against Singapore during the 2014 ICC World Cricket League Division Three in October 2014.

Malla has been regarded as a pillar of Nepalese cricket, having been an ever-present member of the national team from 2004 until his retirement in 2023. In January 2026, he officially joined Rastriya Swatantra Party and started his political journey.

== Career ==
=== Early career ===
Malla made his debut for Nepal as a member of the U-15 cricket team in 2005. He then represented Nepal in ACC U-17 and finally ACC U-19, in the same year. He was named to Nepal U-19s' squad for the 2006 ICC Under-19 Cricket World Cup, following some impressive performances playing in the junior age levels. His career took off when he scored 145 runs in six innings, including 46* in the Plate semi-final of the U-19 World cup to beat South Africa U-19s. His reward was a place on the senior squad for the 2006 Intercontinental Cup.

Malla was known as a dependable batsman of Nepal's team who liked to build the innings under pressure. He had been an important member of the national team and had contributed to many of Nepal's historic successes. He holds the record of hammering six '4s' in an over on his way to scoring the fastest half-century for Nepal in One-Day matches off just 17 deliveries against Saudi Arabia in the 2012 ACC Trophy Elite. He then scored 212 runs with the impressive average of 42, including 2 fifties, which helped Nepal to win the title for the first time. His 86 runs against Canada in the 2014 Cricket World Cup Qualifier, 66 runs against USA in the final of 2012 Division Four, 76* against Qatar in the 2008 ACC Trophy Elite, 75 important runs against USA in the 2008 Division Five, and 67* off just 21 balls against Karnataka Institute of Cricket (India), (SAARC Under-25 Twenty20 Cup 2011) are some of the more memorable innings of his career.

He also represented Nepal in the 2014 ICC World Twenty20 in Bangladesh where he scored 83 runs in three innings at an average of 27.66.

He scored his maiden century against Singapore in the 2014 ICC World Cricket League Division Three in October 2014. He scored 241 runs in six innings at an average of 48.20 during the tournament. Earlier he scored 167 off 157 balls in a practice match against the Ragama Cricket Club, a first-class cricket team from Sri Lanka, when Nepal toured Sri Lanka in preparation for the tournament.

In the 2015 ICC World Cricket League Division Two, he scored 236 runs in 6 innings at an average of 59.00. Nepal qualified for the 2015–17 ICC World Cricket League Championship but failed to secure promotion to Division One and qualification to the 2015–17 ICC Intercontinental Cup.

In the World Cricket League, from 2008 Division Five to 2015 Division Two, he has scored 1262 runs in 45 innings at an average of 36.06, with a hundred and seven fifties.

=== 2018-2023 ===
In July 2018, he was named in Nepal's squad for their One Day International (ODI) series against the Netherlands. These were Nepal's first ODI matches since gaining ODI status during the 2018 Cricket World Cup Qualifier. He made his ODI debut for Nepal against the Netherlands on 1 August 2018.

In August 2018, he was named the vice-captain of Nepal's squad for the 2018 Asia Cup Qualifier tournament. In October 2018, he was named in Nepal's squad in the Eastern sub-region group for the 2018–19 ICC World Twenty20 Asia Qualifier tournament.

In June 2019, he was named the vice-captain of Nepal's squad for the Regional Finals of the 2018–19 ICC T20 World Cup Asia Qualifier tournament. On 24 July 2019, in the match against Malaysia, Malla captained Nepal after regular captain Paras Khadka did not play due to an injury. Nepal went on to win the rain-affected match by 7 wickets with Malla was adjudged man of the match for his half-century and smart captaincy.

He made his first-class debut on 6 November 2019, for Nepal against the Marylebone Cricket Club (MCC), during the MCC's tour of Nepal.

In November 2019, he was named as the captain of Nepal's squads for the 2019 ACC Emerging Teams Asia Cup in Bangladesh, and the cricket tournament at the 2019 South Asian Games. On 5 December 2019, he scored his first century in T20Is. The Nepal team won the bronze medal, after they beat the Maldives by five wickets in the third-place playoff match.

In September 2020, he was one of eighteen cricketers to be awarded with a central contract by the Cricket Association of Nepal. In January 2021, he was named as the captain in the Bagmati Province's squad for the 2021 Prime Minister Cup.

In December 2021, Malla and Dipendra Singh Airee were sacked as captain and vice-captain, respectively, over disciplinary issues and instead Cricket Association of Nepal (CAN) appointed star leg-spinner Sandeep Lamichhane as the new skipper of Nepal national team. Despite that, he was regularly part of the Nepal's 15 player squad for almost all of the league-2 series that Nepal played during the time.

In August 2022, In the third of five matches T20I series against Kenya, in Kenya, Malla was the player of the match for his 46 runs off 41 balls. In the same series, at the final decider game, Malla scored 59 off 44 balls and won the player of the match again, helping the team win the series 3–1.

In December 2022, Malla scored 75 off 94 balls in the ODI (League-2) match against the host Namibia, which was eventually called-off due to rain. In February 2023, against Namibia in Nepal, the third match of the series, Malla scored yet another half-century in ODI, scoring 65 runs in 74 balls. Nepal won that match by 3 wickets.

In August 2023, Malla declared his retirement from international cricket.
