= Puneet Mehra =

Indian cricketer (born 1988)

Personal information
- Born: 6 October 1988 (age 38)
- Source: Cricinfo, 9 April 2016

Puneet Mehra (born 6 October 1988) is an Indian former cricketer. He played six List A matches for Delhi between 2010 and 2011.

== See also ==
- List of Delhi cricketers
