= Jitendra Mukhiya =

Nepalese cricketer (born 1992)

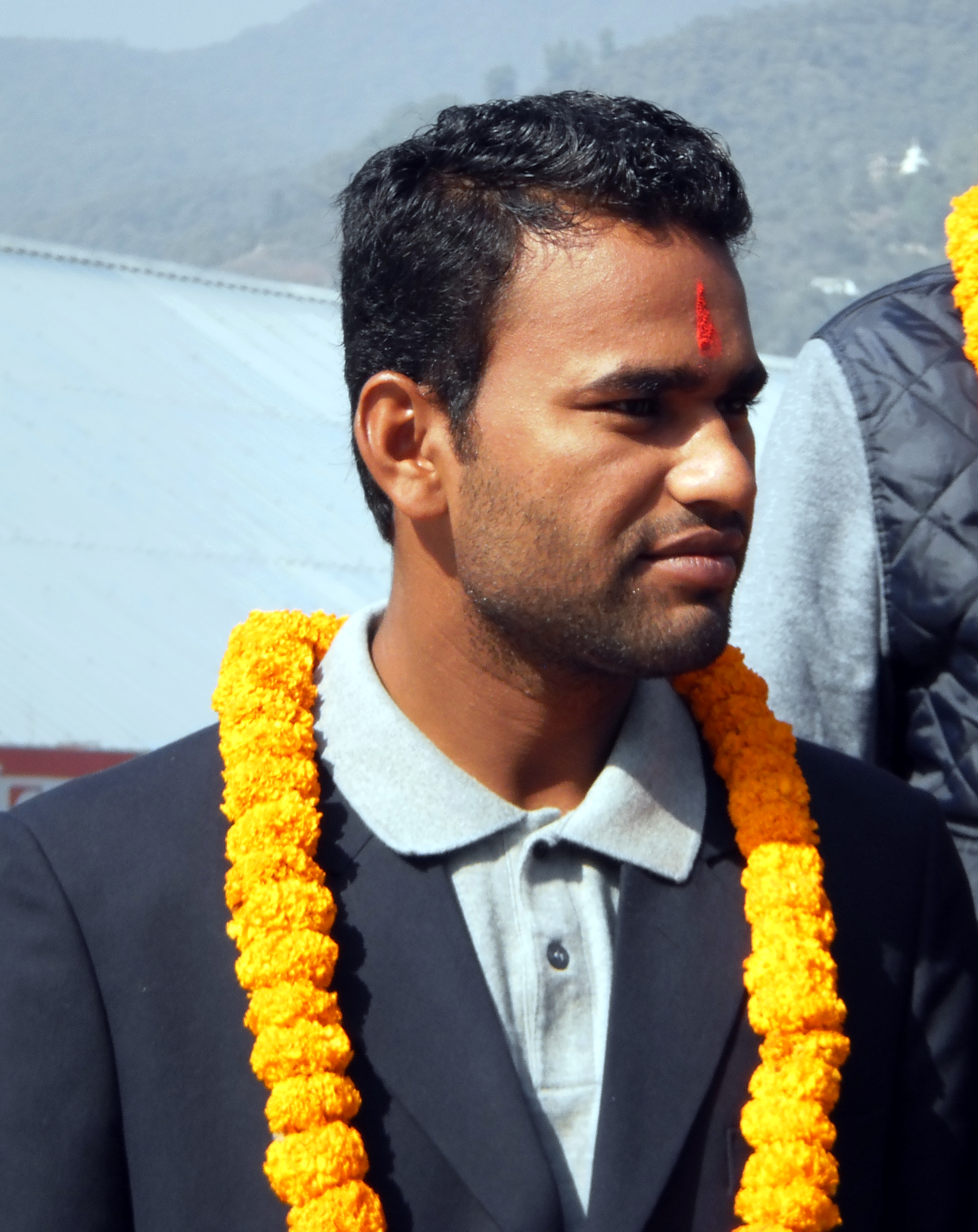

Personal information
- Full name: Jitendra Kumar Mukhiya
- Born: 22 November 1992 (age 33); Rautahat, Nepal
- Height: 5 ft 7 in (1.70 m)
- Batting: Right-handed
- Bowling: Right-arm medium-fast
- Role: Bowler

International information
- National side: Nepal (2014–present)
- T20I debut (cap 7): 16 March 2014 v Hong Kong
- Last T20I: 22 February 2022 v UAE
- T20I shirt no.: 65

Domestic team information
- Years: Team
- 2014–2015: Nepal Army (National League)
- 2014–2014: Panchakanya Tej (NPL)

Career statistics
Competition	T20I	LA	T20
Matches	4	3	15
Runs scored	0	4	6
Batting average	–	2.00	–
100s/50s	0/0	0/0	0/0
Top score	0*	4	6*
Balls bowled	60	126	260
Wickets	4	2	15
Bowling average	14.00	83.00	20.20
5 wickets in innings	0	0	0
10 wickets in match	0	0	0
Best bowling	3/18	2/58	3/18
Catches/stumpings	1/–	0/–	1/–
- Source: CricketArchive, 22 February 2022

Jitendra Kumar Mukhiya (Nepali: जितेन्द्र मुखिया; born 22 November 1992) is a Nepalese cricketer. He is from Rajpur Rautahat. Jitendra is a right-handed batsman and a right-arm medium-fast bowler. He made his debut for Nepal against Denmark in November 2013.

He represents the Nepal Army Club of the National League and Panchakanya Tej of the Nepal Premier League and kathmanduXikings in Everest premier league.

== Playing career ==
Jitendra Mukhiya was the first pick from coach Pubudu Dassanayake in his search for fresh fast bowling talent ahead of experienced seamers in the Nepali squad. Though sent to Singapore to practice with the squad for the ACC Emerging Teams Cup 2013, he didn't make the final cut and was called back. Through continuous good performances in the domestic circuit, it was impossible for him not to be picked for the 2013 ICC World Twenty20 Qualifier, UAE.

Unlike many other players in the national squad, Mukhiya has not been a part of any age group teams for Nepal, but his success was not limited by this. Playing his first tournament for his country, he managed to pick up a total of 11 wickets and established himself as the strike bowler of the team. His wickets, most of them as they were in crucial matches in the 2013 ICC World Twenty20 Qualifier, including 3 each against Hong Kong and Bermuda and 2 each against Denmark and Kenya, showcased the level of bowler he is.

He picked up 4 wickets in the 2014 ICC World Twenty20 and won the man of the match award in the match against Afghanistan by picking of 3 important wickets.
