= Subash Khakurel =

Nepalese cricketer

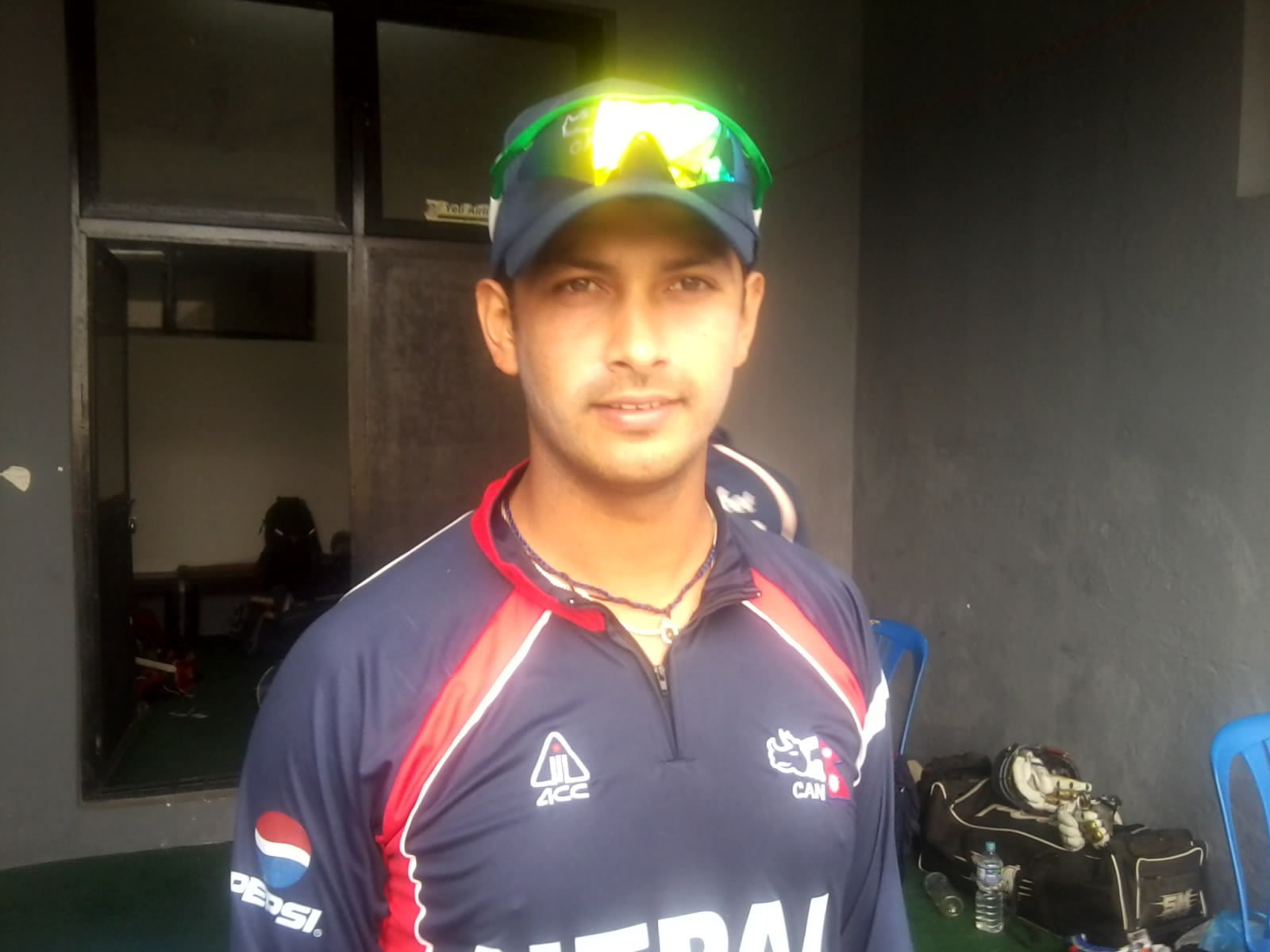

Personal information
- Full name: Subash Khakurel
- Born: 22 June 1987 (age 39); Nepal
- Batting: Right-handed
- Role: Opening batsman and wicket-keeper

International information
- National side: Nepal (2014–2022)
- ODI debut (cap 12): 3 August 2018 v Netherlands
- Last ODI: 9 June 2022 v Oman
- T20I debut (cap 8): 16 March 2014 v Hong Kong
- Last T20I: 15 July 2015 v Hong Kong
- T20I shirt no.: 9

Domestic team information
- Years: Team
- 2011–2015: APF
- 2014–2014: Kantipur Gurkhas
- 2015–2015: Sudur Pashchimanchal Academy

Career statistics
Competition	ODI	T20I	LA	T20
Matches	5	8	13	19
Runs scored	94	112	220	362
Batting average	18.80	14.00	16.92	20.11
100s/50s	0/1	0/1	0/2	0/2
Top score	50	56	63	56
Catches/stumpings	0/1	2/3	11/3	5/8
- Source: ESPNCricinfo, 9 June 2022

Subash Khakurel (Nepali: सुवास खकुरेल; born 22 June 1987) is a Nepalese professional cricketer. He is a right-handed opening batsman and a wicket-keeper. He made his debut for Nepal against Hong Kong in December 2011.

He became the fourth Nepalese cricketer to score an international century, when he slammed 115 off 142 balls against USA during the 2012 ICC World Cricket League Division Four in September 2012.

Khakurel represents the APF Club of the National League, Kantipur Gurkhas of the Nepal Premier League and Sudur Pashchimanchal Academy, which plays in the SPA Cup.

== Playing career ==
In a practice match before the 2010 Division Five matches, Khakurel hammered 53 runs off just 34 balls against USA. The USA coach Clayton Lambert was surprised to know Khakurel was not included in the Nepal squad. He later said "it won't take too long for him to earn the National cap." Indeed, it did not take too long for him. He is naturally attacking; right-hand opening batsman loves to create room and hit boundaries in offside. His quick learning capability helped him to cement his place in the team. Early from his career he was a batsman who looked relatively comfortable in facing sharp Pakistani and Sri Lankan bowling attacks in his debut series. He was selected in the squad to play 2011 ICC Under-19 World Cup Qualifier, where he scored well, compiling a half-century in his first match against Afghanistan.

With the entry of coach Pubudu Dassanayake, he brought a few changes in selection policies, surprising many people. Coach's policy to include new faces in the team added wings to Subash's dream of wearing national jersey. His score of 115 runs against USA in the crucial match of 2012 Division Four, not out 40 runs against USA in the final of the same tournament, half-century against UAE in the final of 2012 ACC Trophy Elite, 78 against Pakistan U-23 in 2013 ACC Emerging Teams Cup and half century against Kenya in the 2013 ICC World Twenty20 Qualifier, 71 against UAE in the 2014 ACC Premier League proved that he is a big match player and he can win the match on himself for Nepal.

His half century against England in 2012 ICC Under-19 World Cup was well appreciated by like of legends like Wasim Akram.

His absence was a huge loss for Nepal in 2014 World Cup Qualifier where did not play any match due to fever so Nepal had to change the opening pair time and again changing the course of the game. It was one of the major reasons behind failure of Nepalese team in the tournament.

He was the highest scorer from Nepal during the 2013 ICC World Twenty20 Qualifier with 234 runs with his best score being a significant 54 that helped Nepal chase a mammoth 183 runs against Kenya.

He scored a half century against Afghanistan in the 2014 ICC World Twenty20, the first Twenty20 International half century by a Nepalese batsman. Due to the innings like this, he is known for his ability to perform at the big stage.

He also scored 39 runs in three innings he batted during the 2014 Asian Games at an average of 39.

He scored 112 runs in the 2014 ICC World Cricket League Division Three held in Malaysia including man of the match performance of an unbeaten 49 against United States.

In July 2018, he was named in Nepal's squad for their One Day International (ODI) series against the Netherlands. These were Nepal's first ODI matches since gaining ODI status during the 2018 Cricket World Cup Qualifier. He made his ODI debut for Nepal against the Netherlands on 3 August 2018.

In August 2018, he was named in Nepal's squad for the 2018 Asia Cup Qualifier tournament. In September 2020, he was one of eighteen cricketers to be awarded with a central contract by the Cricket Association of Nepal.
