= Basanta Regmi =

Nepalese cricketer (born 1986)

Personal information
- Born: 6 April 1986 (age 40); Bhairahawa, Nepal
- Height: 5 ft 5 in (1.65 m)
- Batting: Left-handed
- Bowling: Slow left-arm orthodox
- Role: All-rounder

International information
- National side: Nepal (2006–2019)
- ODI debut (cap 8): 1 August 2018 v Netherlands
- Last ODI: 25 January 2019 v UAE
- T20I debut (cap 8): 16 March 2014 v Hong Kong
- Last T20I: 28 July 2019 v Singapore
- T20I shirt no.: 19

Domestic team information
- Years: Team
- 2011–2015: APF (squad no. 19)
- 2014: Kantipur Gurkhas
- 2016: Kantipur Gurkhas

Career statistics
Competition	T20I	LA	T20
Matches	18	39	40
Runs scored	24	308	103
Batting average	3.42	15.40	7.92
100s/50s	0/0	0/0	0/0
Top score	11	45	20*
Balls bowled	373	1,869	843
Wickets	25	50	53
Bowling average	16.20	25.14	17.00
5 wickets in innings	0	0	0
10 wickets in match	0	0	0
Best bowling	4/16	3/34	4/16
Catches/stumpings	4/–	6/–	12/–
- Source: ESPNCricinfo, 28 September 2021

Basanta Regmi (Nepali: वसन्त रेग्मी) (born 6 April 1986) is a Nepalese professional cricketer. An all-rounder, he bats left-handed and bowls left-arm orthodox spin. He made his debut for Nepal against Namibia in March 2006. He was one of the eleven cricketers to play in Nepal's first ever One Day International (ODI) match, against the Netherlands, in August 2018.

He is the captain of the Kantipur Gurkhas of the Nepal Premier League. He also plays for the APF Club in the National League.

== Change of bowling action ==
Regmi entered the Nepalese cricketing arena as a left-arm fast bowler with a reputation for swinging the ball both ways. However, he suffered a motorbike accident, which significantly affected his career. The accident left Regmi with a broken finger and caused him to change his bowling action, shifting from fast bowling to finger spin.

== Early life and career ==
Born in Bhairahawa in 1986, Regmi first represented Nepal at Under-17 level, playing in the ICC Under-17 Asia Cup in Pakistan in July 2000. In his second match he won the man of the match award for taking 3 important wickets against Bahrain. He also represented Nepal in the ACC Under-17 Asia Cup the following year in Bangladesh.

In 2002, he played his first Under-19 World Cup, the 2002 ICC Under-19 Cricket World Cup in New Zealand but could not do much there as he did not get enough games to play. Nepal finished the tournament as runners-up in the plate competition, but Regmi only played one match, against Scotland. Making his Under-19 youth ODI debut in the match, he didn't bat or bowl during the 48 run win. The following year he played for Nepal Under-19s in one match against their Indian counterparts in Kirtipur, where he bowled future Indian player Suresh Raina.

He played in his second Under-19 World Cup, the 2004 ICC Under-19 Cricket World Cup in Bangladesh. He also played three matches during the ACC Under-19 Cup the following year.

Selectors did not lose their faith in him and he again featured for Nepal in the 2006 ICC Under-19 Cricket World Cup in Sri Lanka. He took 12 wickets and made 141 runs with the bat. His 3 wickets helped win the plate-semifinal against South Africa by 2 runs. In the plate final against New Zealand he scored 66 runs and took 3 wickets and won Man of the match award.

== International career ==
Later in 2006, he made his debut for the senior Nepali team, playing in an ICC Intercontinental Cup play-off match against Namibia. This was followed by three matches against the Pakistan Cricket Academy in Multan, the 2006 ACC Trophy in Malaysia and four matches in the ACC Premier League against Hong Kong, the UAE, Singapore and Malaysia national cricket team.

He played four matches for Nepal in 2007, all in the 2007 ACC Twenty20 Cup in Kuwait. In 2008, he was selected for the Nepal squad for Division Five of the World Cricket League in Jersey. He played in all matches during the tournament.

Later in the year, he played in the 2008 ACC Trophy Elite in Malaysia. In 2009, he played in a three-day match against the Marylebone Cricket Club, taking 3/20 and 3/27 to help lead his team to an innings win over an MCC team captained by former England Test cricketer Min Patel. He also played in the ACC Twenty20 Cup the same year.

Half-century and 2 wickets against Singapore in the 2010 Division Five, innings of 17* runs & 2 important wickets in the same match against Hong Kong in 2011 ACC Twenty20 Cup, 5 wickets against the USA in the final of 2012 Division Four, man of the series performance by taking 21 wickets in the 2012 Division Four (highest wicket taker of the tournament), 10 wickets in 2012 ACC Trophy Elite, 10 wickets in 2013 ACC Twenty20 Cup, and 14 wickets in 2013 ICC World Twenty20 Qualifier.

In the 2014 World Cup Qualifier in New Zealand he scored 118 runs and picked up 9 wickets. He took wickets in all the three matches that Nepal played in the 2014 ICC World Twenty20.

He took 5 wickets during the 2014 Asian Games at an average of 5.80 and an economy rate of 3.16. He was also the best bowler in the 2014 ICC World Cricket League Division Three. He took 14 wickets in the tournament.

He is also the leading wicket taker in World Cricket League matches with 103 wickets in 51 matches at an average of 11.65 and economy rate of 3.00. He is also the first bowler to take 100 wickets in this format, achieving this feat after taking 2 wickets in a match against Netherlands in the 2015 ICC World Cricket League Division Two in Namibia. He took a total of 7 wickets from 5 matches in the tournament.

He took 8 wickets in the 2015 ICC World Twenty20 Qualifier at an average of 13.75 and an economy rate of 6.40, including a four-wicket haul against Hong Kong, which is the best bowling figures of a Nepalese bowler in the T20I format. In the final group stage match against Canada, he took bowling figures of 3/34 to restrict the opponent to 195 runs. The match ended in a last ball victory for Nepal and was qualified to enter 2018 ICC World Cup Qualifier.

In July 2018, he was named in Nepal's squad for their One Day International (ODI) series against the Netherlands. These were Nepal's first ODI matches since gaining ODI status during the 2018 Cricket World Cup Qualifier. He made his ODI debut for Nepal against the Netherlands on 1 August 2018.

In August 2018, he was named in Nepal's squad for the 2018 Asia Cup Qualifier tournament. In October 2018, he was named in Nepal's squad in the Eastern sub-region group for the 2018–19 ICC World Twenty20 Asia Qualifier tournament. In June 2019, he was named in Nepal's squad for the Regional Finals of the 2018–19 ICC T20 World Cup Asia Qualifier tournament. In September 2020, he was one of eighteen cricketers to be awarded with a central contract by the Cricket Association of Nepal.

In June 2021, he was selected to take part in the Minor League Cricket tournament in the United States following the players' draft.

== Playing style ==
Regmi had to change his bowling style due to his broken finger, switching from left-arm fast to slow left-arm orthodox. However, he managed to adapt to the situation and since became an effective wicket-taking option for Nepal. He was inspired by Daniel Vettori and Ashley Giles, and tried to imitate them, watching several highlights to try and learn how to get a batsman out as a spinner. His ability to take the team out of a crisis by taking crucial wickets and checking the flow of runs led to him being nicknamed "Crisis Man" by fans and teammates. He is also known for his ability as a useful partnership breaker. However, he is sometimes criticized for being poor in flat pitches.

He is also a useful lower order batsman, capable of hitting big shots.
