= Paras Khadka =

Secretary of Cricket Association of Nepal

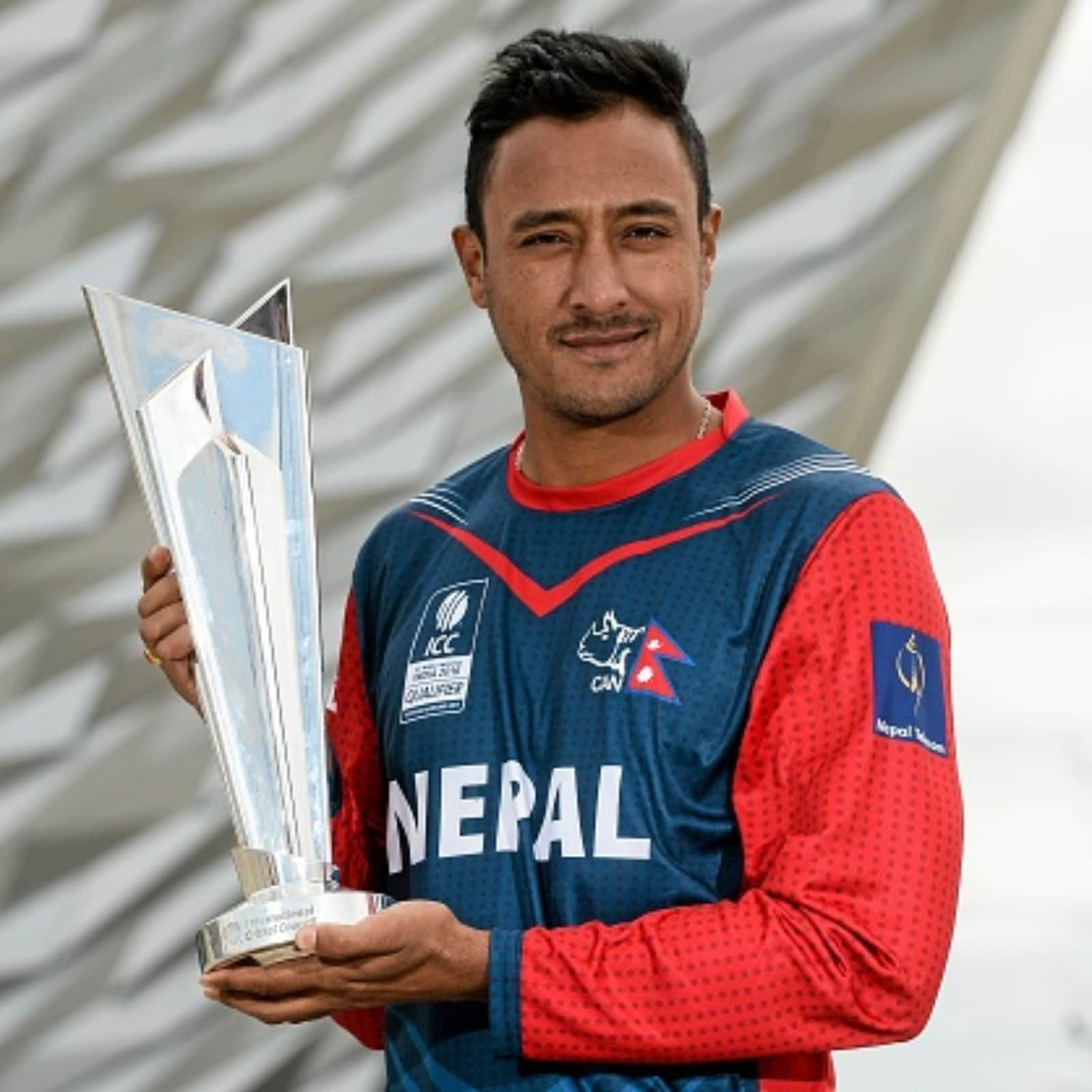

7th Secretary of the Cricket Association of Nepal
- Incumbent
- Assumed office 23 September 2023
- President: Chatur Bahadur Chand
- Preceded by: Asoknath Pyakurel

2nd President of the Bagmati Province Cricket Association
- Incumbent
- Assumed office 1 September 2023
- Preceded by: Raju Basnyat

Personal details
- Born: 24 October 1987 (age 39) Kathmandu, Nepal
- Occupation: Cricketer; cricket administrator
- Cricket career

Cricket information
- Batting: Right-handed
- Bowling: Right-arm medium-fast; Right-arm offbreak
- Role: All-rounder

International information
- National side: Nepal (2004–2020)
- ODI debut (cap 5): 1 August 2018 v Netherlands
- Last ODI: 12 February 2020 v USA
- T20I debut (cap 4): 16 March 2014 v Hong Kong
- Last T20I: 4 March 2020 v Thailand

Domestic team information
- Years: Team
- 2011–2015: APF
- 2012–2013: Biratnagar Warriors
- 2017: Marylebone Cricket Club
- 2019–2020: Team Chauraha Dhangadhi
- 2019–2021: Bagmati Province

Career statistics
Competition	ODI	T20I	FC	LA
Matches	10	33	2	44
Runs scored	315	799	72	1,497
Batting average	35.00	27.55	36.00	35.64
100s/50s	1/1	1/4	0/0	3/9
Top score	115	106*	44	115
Balls bowled	372	348	60	1,428
Wickets	9	8	1	26
Bowling average	27.00	45.00	21.00	35.23
5 wickets in innings	0	0	0	0
10 wickets in match	0	0	0	0
Best bowling	4/26	2/11	1/19	4/26
Catches/stumpings	7/–	16/–	4/–	18/–
Medal record
Representing Nepal
Men's Cricket
South Asian Games
Bronze medal – third place	2019 Kathmandu/Pokhara	Team
- Source: Cricinfo, 3 August 2021

Paras Khadka (/ˈpɑːrəs ˈkʌdkɑː/, Nepali: पारस खड्का, pronounced [ˈpaɾʌs kʰʌɽka]; born 24 October 1987) is a Nepalese former cricketer who is the current Secretary of Cricket Association of Nepal and President of Bagmati Province Cricket Association. He captained the Nepalese cricket team from 2008 to 2019. An all-rounder, Khadka was a right-handed batsman, a right-arm medium-fast and an off-break bowler. He made his debut against Malaysia in April 2004. Khadka played in Nepal's inaugural One Day International (ODI) match, against the Netherlands, in August 2018. He has played a useful role in Nepalese cricket.

Khadka became the sixth Nepali cricketer to score an international century when he hit an unbeaten 106 off 77 balls against Kuwait during the 2012 ACC Trophy Elite in October 2012. Under his captaincy, Nepal won the 2010 ICC World Cricket League Division Five in Nepal, 2012 ICC World Cricket League Division Four in Malaysia, 2012 ACC Trophy Elite in UAE, 2013 ICC World Cricket League Division Three in Bermuda, 2014 ICC World Cricket League Division Three in Malaysia, participated in the 2014 ICC World Twenty20 in Bangladesh and gained the Twenty20 International status.

On 28 January 2019, he became the first Nepalese batsman to score a century in an ODI match, doing so against the United Arab Emirates. On 28 September 2019, he became the first batsman for Nepal to score a century in a T20I match, against Singapore.

== Career ==
=== Early career ===
Born in Kathmandu in 1987, Khadka first represented Nepal at the Under-15 level when he played in the Under-15 Asia Cup in the United Arab Emirates in December 2002. He played for the Nepal Under-19s the following year, once against India Under-19s, and also in the 2003 Youth Asia Cup in Karachi.

In 2001, after playing in the ACC Under-17 Cup in India, he played in his first Under-19 World Cup, the 2004 ICC Under-19 Cricket World Cup in Bangladesh. He also debuted for the senior side when he played against Malaysia in the 2004 ICC Intercontinental Cup, his first-class debut.

Later in the year, he played in the 2004 ACC Trophy in Kuala Lumpur in addition to ACC Fast Track Countries Tournament matches against Singapore, the UAE and Hong Kong. In early 2005, he played in the Repêchage Tournament of the 2005 ICC Trophy,

After a 2005 ICC Intercontinental Cup match against Hong Kong, Khadka returned to the Nepal Under-19 team for the 2005 ACC Under-19 Cup, held in Nepal. Nepal won the tournament after beating Malaysia in the final, thus qualifying for the 2006 ICC Under-19 Cricket World Cup in Sri Lanka the following February. Nepal won the plate tournament in the World Cup, beating Test-playing nations New Zealand and South Africa along the way.

Returning to the senior side, Khadka went on a tour of Pakistan before playing in the 2006 ACC Trophy in Kuala Lumpur. That year, he also played in all four ACC Premier League matches against Hong Kong, the UAE, Singapore and Malaysia. He played in the 2007 ACC Under-19 Cup in Kuala Lumpur, which Nepal again won after beating Afghanistan in the final. He also played in the 2007 ACC Twenty20 Cup in Kuwait and captained Nepal in the 2008 ICC Under-19 Cricket World Cup in Malaysia, leading Nepal to a tenth-place finish.

=== 2008-2015 ===
Before the 2008 ICC Under-19 Cricket World Cup, which he captained, Khadka was quoted by the World Cup souvenir program as being "arguably good enough to be in the line-up of any of the Test-playing countries".

He also successfully led the country to win the 2010 ICC World Cricket League Division Five.

In May 2012, he went to play for the Ontario Cricket Academy and Club in Canada for four months through the efforts of his national team coach, Pubudu Dassanayake. Khadka rejoined the club for the 2013 season as vice-captain. In the 2012 ICC World Twenty20 Qualifier, he scored 254 runs in 8 innings at an average of 50.80.

In 2012, Nepal won the 2012 ACC Trophy Elite title in the UAE, scoring 291 runs at an average of 72.75 and picking up 9 wickets. He also scored his maiden century against Kuwait in the tournament. He was named the Player of the Tournament. Then he led Nepal to win the 2012 ICC World Cricket League Division Four in Malaysia.

He was also named the Player of the Tournament in the 2013 ACC Twenty20 Cup, where he scored 207 runs with an average of 41.40. He led Nepal to win the 2013 ICC World Cricket League Division Three in Bermuda and qualified for the 2014 Cricket World Cup Qualifier in New Zealand.

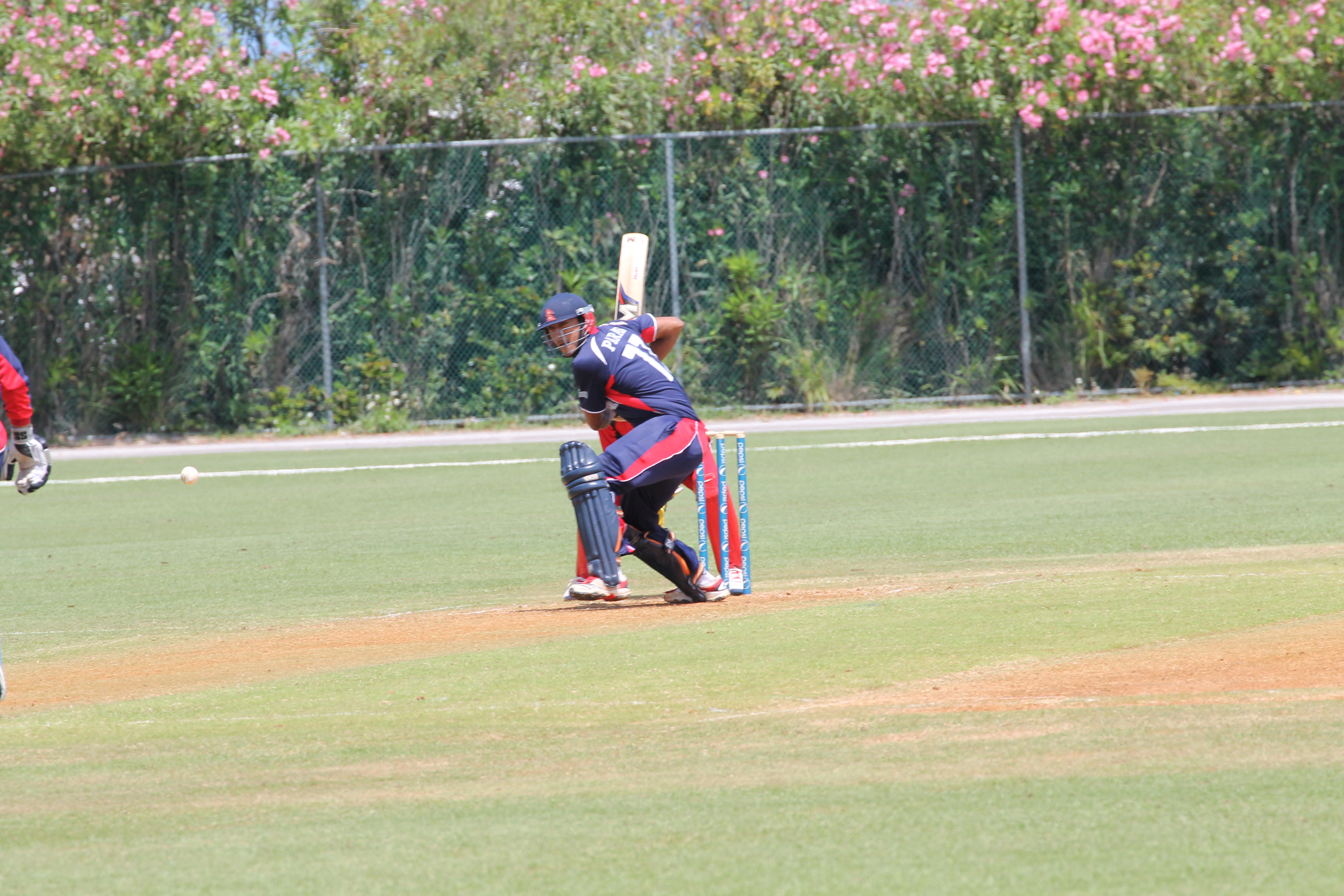
Nepal Captain Paras Khadka batting during the 2013 ICC World Cricket League Division Three in Bermuda

He also successfully led his country to their first World Cup appearance in the 2014 ICC World Twenty20, after finishing third in the 2013 ICC World Twenty20 Qualifier in the UAE, just behind Ireland and Afghanistan.

In the 2014 ICC World Twenty20 in Bangladesh, he scored 41 runs in both matches against Hong Kong and Bangladesh. He became the eighth player in T20I history to take a wicket with the first ball of his career. He set this record against Hong Kong when he took the wicket of Irfan Ahmed. ESPNcricinfo said he is Nepal's Kapil Dev after he took two catches during the match against Afghanistan in the 2014 ICC World Twenty20, which helped Nepal seal the 9-run victory.

In the 2015 ICC World Cricket League Division Two, he scored 185 runs in 6 innings at an average of 30.83 and picked up 6 wickets at an average of 22.83 and an economy rate of 2.63. Nepal qualified for the 2015–17 ICC World Cricket League Championship but failed to secure promotion to Division One and qualification to the 2015–17 ICC Intercontinental Cup. Earlier, he scored an unbeaten 123 off 114 balls in a practice match against Eastern Invitational XI, a cricket team of South Africa, when Nepal toured South Africa in preparation for the tournament in January 2015.

In the World Cricket League, from 2008 Division Five to 2015 Division Two, he has scored 1157 runs in 46 innings at an average of 31.27, with seven fifties.

He was selected for the Marylebone Cricket Club squad for the Emirates T20 tournament, which was held in March 2015. He scored 137 runs in the T20i series against the Netherlands at an average of 45.66.

=== 2018 onwards ===
In January 2018, he was named captain in Nepal's squad for the 2018 ICC World Cricket League Division Two tournament. In the first match against the host Namibia national cricket team, Nepal won the toss and elected to field first. Paras bowled 4 overs with his figures of 1/16. In a chase of 139, Khadka scored 19 off 35 balls. Nepal won the match by 1 wicket with 4 balls remaining. The second match was with the Oman national cricket team. Paras Khadka scored 17 off 42 balls as Nepal got all out in 138 runs in the 46th over. Khadka bowled his spell of 0/16 in 3 overs in the match. Oman won the match by 6 wickets. With one win and one loss in the tournament, the next game against the UAE was crucial for Nepal. In the third match against UAE, he scored 51 runs, hitting five sixes and two fours, which was crucial enough to be adjudged man of the match. With that win, Nepal scored 4 points in 3 matches and stood in second place behind Canada. In the fourth match against Kenya, he scored a crucial 42 runs off 44 balls with 3 fours and 2 sixes in a low-scoring contest, which turned into a victory for Nepal. In the fifth and final ICC World Cricket League Division Two match, he bowled his 7 overs spell of 0/16 in the game and got out in the first ball.

In the final match of the 2018 ICC World Cricket League Division Two against UAE, he scored 112 * runs off 103 balls with 8 sixes and 3 fours in a losing cause. In reply to UAE's 277 runs, Nepal scored 270/8 in the stipulated 50 overs, losing by 7 runs. Khadka scored his century in the final over and lost the match despite hitting 3 sixes in the final over. He remained unbeaten, scoring his 2nd List A century while none of his teammates scored a fifty. On return to Nepal, he praised the performances of Sandeep Lamichhane and Karan KC in the last league match against Canada. He praised his teammates as:

There were new heroes in every game that showed that every player was excited and determined to win matches.

Prime Minister KP Sharma Oli felicitated him and other cricketers for their performances in the 2018 ICC World Cricket League Division Two.

In July 2018, he was named the captain of Nepal's squad for their One Day International (ODI) series against the Netherlands. These were Nepal's first ODI matches since gaining ODI status during the 2018 Cricket World Cup Qualifier. He made his ODI debut for Nepal against the Netherlands on 1 August 2018.

In August 2018, he was named the captain of Nepal's squad for the 2018 Asia Cup Qualifier tournament. In October 2018, he was named the captain of Nepal's squad in the Eastern sub-region group for the 2018–19 ICC World Twenty20 Asia Qualifier tournament.

In the third match of Nepal's tour of the United Arab Emirates, Paras became the first Nepalese batsman to score an ODI century in Dubai. He was adjudged the Man of the Match, scoring 115 runs off 109 balls.

In June 2019, he was named the captain of Nepal's squad for the Regional Finals of the 2018–19 ICC T20 World Cup Asia Qualifier tournament. In September 2019, he scored his first T20I century and became the first and only captain in men's T20I cricket to score a century as a captain when chasing.

On 15 October 2019, Khadka resigned as the Nepalese national cricket team captain. He explained that he wanted a new way of taking things forward with a fresh start and committed vision, with everyone involved, following the reinstatement of the Cricket Association of Nepal.

Soon after he resigned from captaincy, Khadka was signed by Team Abu Dhabi for the 2019 T10 League. With this signing, Khadka became the 3rd Nepalese cricketer to play in a foreign franchise league, after Sandeep Lamichhane and Sompal Kami. Khadka said, "It is an honour to play in this incredibly exciting tournament. I know the matches will be intense, but I love playing against the world's best. I hope to see the Nepalese flag flying high in the stands of Zayed Cricket Stadium when I play next month." Khadka replaced Pakistani left-arm pacer Mohammad Amir after the PCB ruled him and other Pakistani players ineligible for the tournament. Trevor Bayliss, head coach of Team Abu Dhabi, referred to him as an impressive player who excelled in short forms of the game, and both his batting and bowling prowess made him a threat to the opposition.

In November 2019, he was also named in Nepal's squad for the cricket tournament at the 2019 South Asian Games. The Nepal team won the bronze medal after they beat the Maldives by five wickets in the third-place playoff match. In September 2020, he was among eighteen cricketers awarded a central contract by the Cricket Association of Nepal.

In November 2020, Khadka was nominated for the ICC Men's Associate Cricketer of the Decade award.

On 3 August 2021, Khadka announced retirement from international cricket.

== Post-retirement ==
Post-retirement, Paras Khadka has established a cricket academy named Cricket Excellence Center to work for grassroots cricket development in Nepal. The academy is located in Baluwatar, Kathmandu, which has world-class cricketing facilities to ensure the growth of aspiring cricketers in Nepal.

Paras Khadka was included in the Asia Lions squad for the Legends League Cricket Masters 2022–23, where he participated as an all‑rounder.

Khadka was signed to Team Gujarat for the Legends League Cricket 2024, a T-20 cricket league that includes recently retired international players. Paras Khadka was signed in both previous editions, but he didn't participate in the first one for personal reasons.

== Administration career ==
On 14 August 2023, Khadka was elected as a Kathmandu District Cricket Administration member. On 1 September 2023, he became the president of the Bagmati Province Cricket Association of Nepal. On 23 September 2023, he was elected as the secretary of the Cricket Association of Nepal.

== 2010 boycott ==
In May 2010, 18 members of the national cricket team, led by Khadka, held a press conference and said they would not play in the national league because of the behavior of the Cricket Association of Nepal (CAN). He led the boycott of the national league for the second time in April 2014, demanding the restructuring of the Cricket Association of Nepal and better facilities for players. This resulted in CAN being drawn into the controversy of financial mismanagement.

== Awards ==
- NSFJ Pulsar Player of the Year 2016 AD
- NSFJ Pulsar Player of the Year 2017 AD
- NNIPA Best Cricketer of the Year 2017
- NSFJ Pulsar Player of the Year 2018 AD
- ICC Men's Associate Player of the Decade Nominee
- NSJF Pulsar Player of the Decade 2022 AD

== Personal life ==
He married his longtime girlfriend, Prapti Rajyalaxmi Rana, on 26 February 2015.
