= Nepal T20 League =

Nepalese cricket tournament

- Countries: Nepal
- Administrator: Cricket Association of Nepal
- Headquarters: Mulpani, Kathmandu
- Format: Twenty20
- First edition: 2022
- Tournament format: Double Round-robin and playoffs
- Number of teams: 6
- Current champion: Lumbini All Stars
- Most runs: Hashmatullah Shahidi (400)
- Most wickets: Avinash Bohara (19)
- Website: nepalt20.com

The Nepal T20 League was a Nepalese men's Twenty20 cricket league which was established by the Cricket Association of Nepal in 2022. The competition only ran in 2022–23 and was held between 24 December 2022 and 11 January 2023. The league was replaced by the Nepal Premier League from 2024. Lumbini All Stars were the only champions, defeating Biratnagar Super Kings by 24 runs in the final.

All matches were played at Tribhuvan University Cricket Ground at Kirtipur.

== History ==
In April 2022, the Cricket Association of Nepal (CAN) signed a NPR 330 million agreement with Indian sports management company Seven3Sports for a period of eight years to hold a franchise Twenty20 tournament. On 18 May 2022, CAN announced that the first edition of the tournament would be held in September and October, and in July the league was authorized by the International Cricket Council. On 19 July, four franchises and their owners were announced. Two more franchises were announced on 8 September. The draft was held from 10 September 2022 to 11 September 2022.

On 15 September, the competition was postponed to December due to security concerns following the announcement of the 2022 Nepalese general election. Scheduled to begin on 11 December, it was postponed to later in the month after the Kathmandu Gurkhas franchise withdrew from the tournament. The team was replaced by a new Kathmandu franchise, the Kathmandu Knights. The league bagan on 24 December.

== Teams ==
Team	City	Province	Captain
Biratnagar Super Kings	Biratnagar	Koshi Province	Andre McCarthy
Far West United	Dhangadi	Sudurpashchim Province	Hashmatullah Shahidi
Janakpur Royals	Janakpur	Madhesh Province	Trevon Griffith
Kathmandu Knights	Kathmandu	Bagmati Province	Gyanendra Malla
Lumbini All Stars	Bhairahawa	Lumbini Province	Dipendra Singh Airee
Pokhara Avengers	Pokhara	Gandaki Province	Upul Tharanga

== Squads ==
Biratnagar Super Kings	Far West United	Janakpur Royals	Kathmandu Knights	Lumbini All Stars	Pokhara Avengers
Andre McCarthy (c); Hussain Talat; Sikandar Raza; Sanjeew Kumaraswamy; Keon Joseph; Gauranshu Sharma; Raj Rocky Nannan; Arjun Saud (wk); Rohit Paudel; Bibek Yadav; Shahab Alam; Pradeep Airee; Prithu Baskota; Surya Tamang; Rijan Dhakal; Nandan Yadav; Amar Singh Rautela	Hashmatullah Shahidi (c); Milinda Siriwardana; Noor Ahmad; Umair Ali; Binod Bhandari (wk); Karan KC; Bhim Sharki; Dev Khanal; Rashid Khan; Bhuvan Karki; Harishankar Shah; Durgesh Gupta; Sher Malla; Basant Karki; Prakash Jaisi; Hashim Ansari	Trevon Griffith (c); Samiullah Shinwari; Sharafuddin Ashraf; Ashan Priyanjan; Chadwick Walton; Kesrick Williams; Dilip Nath (wk); Sompal Kami; Sandeep Jora; Aadil Alam; Lalit Rajbanshi; Sushan Bhari; Sagar Pun; Pawan Sarraf; Jitendra Mukhiya; Rajesh Pulami; Khadak Bohara	Gyanendra Malla (c); Azmatullah Omarzai; Alex Blake; Ryan Burl; Virandeep Singh; Lokesh Bam (wk); Basir Ahamad; Kamal Singh Airee; Abinash Bohara; Anil Kharel; Saurabh Khanal; Sandeep Rajali; Santosh Karki; Sunam Gautam; Gautam KC	Dipendra Airee (c); Pat Brown; Shadley van Schalkwyk; Lahiru Milantha; Harry Tector; Unmukt Chand; Bipul Sharma; Harmeet Singh Baddhan; Anil Kumar Sah (wk); Kushal Bhurtel; Gulsan Jha; Sagar Dhakal; Sunil Dhamala; Kishore Mahato; Ishan Pandey; Akash Chand; Yogendra Singh Karki; Tilakraj Bhandari	Upul Tharanga (c); Asitha Fernando; Ameer Hamza; Abhimanyu Mithun; Zahir Khan; Aasif Sheikh (wk); Aarif Sheikh; Sharad Vesawkar; Kushal Malla; Pratis GC; Mousom Dhakal; Siddhant Lohani; Tul Bahadur Thapa; Bishal Bikram KC; Krishna Karki; Bipin Khatri; Sumit Maharjan

== League stage ==
Pos	Team	Pld	W	L	T	NR	Pts	NRR
1	Lumbini All Stars	10	8	2	0	0	16	0.984
2	Janakpur Royals	10	7	3	0	0	14	0.667
3	Biratnagar Super Kings	10	5	5	0	0	10	−0.478
4	Kathmandu Knights	10	4	6	0	0	8	−0.271
5	Far West United	10	3	7	0	0	6	−0.227
6	Pokhara Avengers	10	3	7	0	0	6	−0.888

Source: Cricinfo
- The top four teams qualified for the playoffs.
  - Advanced to Qualifier 1.
  - Advanced to Eliminator.

=== Matches ===
Match 1
24 December 2022
09:00
Scorecard

Kathmandu Knights; 162/5 (19 overs)	v	Pokhara Avengers; 136/7 (19 overs)
Azmatullah Omarzai 85 (42); Zahir Khan 2/30 (3 overs)		Upul Tharanga 44 (34); Abinash Bohara 3/29 (4 overs)

Kathmandu Knights won by 26 runs.
TU Cricket Ground, Kirtipur
Umpires: Himal Giri & Vinay Kumar Jha
Player of the match: Azmatullah Omarzai (KDK)

- Pokhara Avengers won the toss and elected to field.
- Rain reduced the play to 19 overs.

Match 2
24 December 2022
13:00
Scorecard

Lumbini All Stars; 152/7 (20 overs)	v	Far West United; 85 (16.2 overs)
Lahiru Milantha 60 (50); Umair Ali 3/30 (4 overs)		Hashmatullah Shahidi 35 (44); Dipendra Singh Airee 3/6 (2.2 overs)

Lumbini All Stars won by 67 runs.
TU Cricket Ground, Kirtipur
Umpires: Ram Pandey & Sanjay Gurung
Player of the match: Lahiru Milantha (LAS)

- Lumbini All Stars won the toss and elected to bat.

Match 3
25 December 2022
09:00
Scorecard

Lumbini All Stars; 157/6 (20 overs)	v	Biratnagar Super Kings; 154/6 (20 overs)
Lahiru Milantha 80* (63); Sikandar Raza 1/23 (4 overs)		Hussain Talat 39 (24); Kishore Mahato 2/18 (4 overs)

Lumbini All Stars won by 3 runs.
TU Cricket Ground, Kirtipur
Umpires: Ram Yadav & Vinay Kumar Jha
Player of the match: Lahiru Milantha (LAS)

- Biratnagar Super Kings won the toss and elected to field.

Match 4
25 December 2022
13:00
Scorecard

Pokhara Avengers; 138 (19.4 overs)	v	Janakpur Royals; 139/5 (17.4 overs)
Aasif Sheikh 50 (39); Kesrick Williams 3/19 (3.4 overs)		Sundeep Jora 40* (30); Zahir Khan 3/37 (4 overs)

Janakpur Royals won by 5 wickets.
TU Cricket Ground, Kirtipur
Umpires: Ram Pandey & Durga Subedi
Player of the match: Kesrick Williams (JKR)

- Janakpur Royals won the toss and elected to field.

Match 5
26 December 2022
09:00
Scorecard

Kathmandu Knights; 98/9 (20 overs)	v	Far West United; 102/6 (19.1 overs)
Alex Blake 45* (37); Umair Ali 3/15 (4 overs)		Hashmatullah Shahidi 50* (49); Anil Kharel 2/10 (4 overs)

Far West United won by 4 wickets.
TU Cricket Ground, Kirtipur
Umpires: Durga Subedi & Himal Giri
Player of the match: Hashmatullah Shahidi (FWU)

- Far West United won the toss and elected to field.

Match 6
26 December 2022
13:00
Scorecard

Biratnagar Super Kings; 140 (19.5 overs)	v	Janakpur Royals; 141/5 (20 overs)
Sikander Raza 38 (18); Lalit Rajbanshi 5/8 (4 overs)		Chadwick Walton 69* (55); Nandan Yadav 1/23 (4 overs)

Janakpur Royals won by 5 wickets.
TU Cricket Ground, Kirtipur
Umpires: Ram Pandey & Vinay Kumar Jha
Player of the match: Lalit Rajbanshi (JKR)

- Biratnagar Super Kings won the toss and elected to bat.

Match 7
27 December 2022
09:00
Scorecard

Pokhara Avengers; 133/9 (20 overs)	v	Lumbini All Stars; 135/7 (20 overs)
Kushal Malla 61 (31); Shadley van Schalkwyk 3/27 (4 overs)		Kushal Bhurtel 39 (28); Kushal Malla 2/8 (2 overs)

Lumbini All Stars won by 3 wickets.
TU Cricket Ground, Kirtipur
Umpires: Himal Giri & Sanjay Gurung
Player of the match: Shadley van Schalkwyk (LAS)

- Lumbini All Stars won the toss and elected to field.

Match 8
27 December 2022
13:00
Scorecard

Kathmandu Knights; 208/6 (20 overs)	v	Janakpur Royals; 155 (20 overs)
Alex Blake 83 (43); Pawan Sarraf 2/18 (4 overs)		Samiullah Shinwari 28 (27); Azmatullah Omarzai 3/25 (4 overs)

Kathmandu Knights won by 53 runs.
TU Cricket Ground, Kirtipur
Umpires: Ram Yadav & Vinay Kumar Jha
Player of the match: Alex Blake (KDK)

- Kathmandu Knights won the toss and elected to bat.

Match 9
28 December 2022
09:00
Scorecard

Far West United; 137/6 (20 overs)	v	Lumbini All Stars; 137/9 (20 overs)
Dev Khanal 48 (42); Shadley van Schalkwyk 2/39 (4 overs)		Gulsan Jha 36* (24); Karan KC 2/20 (4 overs)

Lumbini All Stars won the one-over eliminator.
TU Cricket Ground, Kirtipur
Umpires: Sanjay Gurung & Vinay Kumar Jha
Player of the match: Lahiru Milantha (LAS)

- Lumbini All Stars won the toss and elected to field.
- Match Tied and went into one-over eliminator

Match 10
28 December 2022
13:00
Scorecard

Pokhara Avengers; 139/7 (19 overs)	v	Biratnagar Super Kings; 140/4 (17.5 overs)
Kushal Malla 37 (18); Raj Nannan 2/8 (2 overs)		Hussain Talat 50* (30); Kushal Malla 2/21 (4 overs)

Biratnagar Super Kings won by 6 wickets.
TU Cricket Ground, Kirtipur
Umpires: Durga Subedi & Ram Pandey
Player of the match: Hussain Talat (BSK)

- Biratnagar Super Kings won the toss and elected to field.

Match 11
29 December 2022
09:00
Scorecard

Pokhara Avengers; 135/6 (20 overs)	v	Birtnagar Super Kings; 138/2 (18.4 overs)
Ameer Hamza 37* (25); Andre McCarthy 3/22 (4 overs)		Rohit Paudel 71* (57); Ameer Hamza 1/10 (2 overs)

Biratnagar Super Kings won by 8 wickets
TU Cricket Ground, Kirtipur
Umpires: Durga Subedi & Vinay Kumar Jha
Player of the match: Rohit Paudel (BSK)

- Biratnagar Super Kings won the toss and elected to field.

Match 12
29 December 2022
13:00
Scorecard

Far West United; 169/6 (20 overs)	v	Janakpur Royals; 171/2 (18.2 overs)
Karan KC 46* (17); Lalit Rajbanshi 2/25 (4 overs)		Sandeep Jora 77* (54); Karan KC 2/25 (3.2 overs)

Janakpur Royals won by 8 wickets
TU Cricket Ground, Kirtipur
Umpires: Ram Pandey & Sanjay Gurung
Player of the match: Sandeep Jora (JKR)

- Janakpur Royals won the toss and elected to field.

Match 13
30 December 2022
09:00
Scorecard

Lumbini All Stars; 150/8 (20 overs)	v	Kathmandu Knights; 115/8 (20 overs)
Dipendra Singh Airee 40 (27); Azmatullah Omarzai 2/12 (4 overs)		Azmatullah Omarzai 38 (29); Harmeet Singh Baddhan 3/7 (4 overs)

Lumbini All Starts won by 35 runs
TU Cricket Ground, Kirtipur
Umpires: Himal Giri & Vinay Kumar Jha
Player of the match: Harmeet Singh Baddhan (LAS)

- Lumbini All Starts won the toss and elected to bat.

Match 14
30 December 2022
13:00
Scorecard

Far West United; 187/9 (20 overs)	v	Pokhara Avengers; 188/7 (19.1 overs)
Umair Ali 42 (26); Zahir Khan 3/24 (4 overs)		Aasif Sheikh 45 (33); Prakash Jaishi 2/25 (3.1 overs)

Pokhara Avengers won by 3 wickets
TU Cricket Ground, Kirtipur
Umpires: Durga Subedi & Ram Yadav
Player of the match: Kushal Malla (PKA)

- Far West United won the toss and elected to bat.

Match 15
31 December 2022
09:00
Scorecard

Lumbini All Stars; 127 (19.5 overs)	v	Pokhara Avengers; 128/1 (18.2 overs)
Harmeet Singh Baddhan 38 (21); Zahir Khan 3/18 (4 overs)		Aasif Sheikh 77* (62); Kishore Mahato 1/16 (3 overs)

Pokhara Avengers won by 9 wickets
TU Cricket Ground, Kirtipur
Umpires: Ram Pandey & Vinay Kumar Jha
Player of the match: Aasif Sheikh (PKA)

- Lumbini All Stars won the toss and elected to bat.

Match 16
31 December 2022
13:00
Scorecard

Janakpur Royals; 189/6 (20 overs)	v	Biratnagar Super Kings; 140/7 (20 overs)
Samiullah Shinwari 78* (40); Surya Tamang 2/16 (4 overs)		Hussain Talat 42 (20); Samiullah Shinwari 3/21 (4 overs)

Janakpur Royals won by 49 runs
TU Cricket Ground, Kirtipur
Umpires: Durga Subedi & Himal Giri
Player of the match: Samiullah Shinwari (BSK)

- Biratnagar Super Kings won the toss and elected to field.

Match 17
1 January 2023
09:00
Scorecard

Janakpur Royals; 90 (19.1 overs)	v	Kathmandu Knights; 180/6 (20 overs)
Sharafuddin Ashraf 37 (31); Abinash Bohara 4/13 (4.1 overs)		Sunam Gautam 62 (47); Jitendra Mukhiya 3/38 (4 overs)

Kathmandu Knights won by 90 runs
TU Cricket Ground, Kirtipur
Umpires: Durga Subedi & Ram Yadav
Player of the match: Sunam Gautam (KDK)

- Janakpur Royals won the toss and elected to field.

Match 18
1 January 2023
13:00
Scorecard

Lumbini All Stars; 122/9 (20 overs)	v	Biratnagar Super Kings; 110 (19.3 overs)
Dipendra Singh Airee 50 (42); Surya Tamang 2/8 (4 overs)		Arjun Saud 41 (45); Tilak Bhandari 2/14 (4 overs)

Lumbini All Stars won by 12 runs
TU Cricket Ground, Kirtipur
Umpires: Ram Pandey & Vinay Kumar Jha
Player of the match: Dipendra Singh Airee (LAS)

- Lumbini All Stars won the toss elected to bat.

Match 19
2 January 2023
09:00
Scorecard

Kathmandu Knights; 164/4 (20 overs)	v	Pokhara Avengers; 168/5 (20 overs)
Alex Blake 64 (28); Tul Thapa 2/17 (2 overs)		Sumit Maharjan 76 (52); Kamal Airee 3/26 (3.4 overs)

Pokhara Avengers won by 5 wickets
TU Cricket Ground, Kirtipur
Umpires: Himal Giri & Ram Pandey
Player of the match: Sumit Maharjan (PKA)

- Pokhara Avengers won the toss and elected to field.

Match 20
2 January 2023
13:00
Scorecard

Janakpur Royals; 161/7 (20 overs)	v	Far West United; 79 (15.1 overs)
Sandeep Jora 55 (32); Prakash Jaishi 3/25 (4 overs)		Hashmatullah Shahidi 32 (32); Samiullah Shinwari 3/16 (3 overs)

Janakpur Royals won by 82 runs.
TU Cricket Ground, Kirtipur
Umpires: Ran Yadav & Vinay Kumar Jha
Player of the match: Sandeep Jora (JKR)

- Far West United won the toss and elected to field.

Match 21
3 January 2023
09:00
Scorecard

Kathmandu Knights; 92/5 (9 overs)	v	Biratnagar Super Kings; 58 (8.5 overs)
Sandeep Rajali 32* (22); Nandan Yadav 3/8 (2 overs)		Gauranshu Sharma 22 (13); Kamal Airee 3/13 (1.5 overs)

Kathmandu Knights won by 34 runs
TU Cricket Ground, Kirtipur
Umpires: Ram Pandey & Sanjay Gurung
Player of the match: Sandeep Rajali (KDK)

- Kathmandu Knights won the toss and elected to bat.
- The match was reduced to 9 overs per side due to delay.

Match 22
3 January 2023
13:00
Scorecard

Lumbini All Stars; 178/6 (20 overs)	v	Janakpur Royals; 173/5 (20 overs)
Harmeet Singh Baddhan 73 (47); Sharafuddin Ashraf 3/35 (3 overs)		Chadwick Walton 59 (36); Harry Tector 2/23 (4 overs)

Lumbini All Stars won by 5 runs
TU Cricket Ground, Kirtipur
Umpires: Durga Subedi & Vinay Kumar Jha
Player of the match: Harmeet Singh Baddhan (LAS)

- Lumbini All Stars won the toss and elected to bat.

Match 23
4 January 2023
09:00
Scorecard

Lumbini All Stars; 183/6 (17 overs)	v	Kathmandu Knights; 81 (15.4 overs)
Harmeet Singh Baddhan 70 (36); Abinash Bohara 3/32 (4 overs)		Basir Ahamad 22 (30); Kushal Bhurtel 2/10 (3 overs)

Lumbini All Stars won by 102 runs
TU Cricket Ground, Kirtipur
Umpires: Himal Giri & Vinay Kumar Jha
Player of the match: Harmeet Singh Baddhan (LAS)

- Lumbini All Stars won the toss and elected to bat.
- The match was reduced to 17 overs per side due to delay.

Match 24
4 January 2023
13:00
Scorecard

Far West United; 156/9 (20 overs)	v	Biratnagar Super Kings; 158/4 (19.3 overs)
Binod Bhandari 45 (38); Shahab Alam 3/43 (4 overs)		Rohit Paudel 60 (42); Hashmatullah Shahidi 1/3 (1 over)

Biratnagar Super Kings won by 6 wickets
TU Cricket Ground, Kirtipur
Umpires: Durga Subedi & Ram Pandey
Player of the match: Rohit Paudel (BSK)

- Far West United won the toss and elected to bat.

Match 25
5 January 2023
09:00
Scorecard

Pokhara Avengers; 68 (12 overs)	v	Janakpur Royals; 70/4 (9 overs)
Siddhant Lohani 17 (10); Sompal Kami 3/8 (2 overs)		Sharafuddin Ashraf 37 (27); Kushal Malla 3/10 (3 overs)

Janakpur Royals on by 6 wickets
TU Cricket Ground, Kirtipur
Umpires: Durga Subedi & Ram Yadav
Player of the match: Sompal Kami (JKR)

- Janakpur Royals on the toss and elected to field.

Match 26
5 January 2023
13:00
Scorecard

Far West United; 197/4 (20 overs)	v	Kathmandu Knights; 114/9 (20 overs)
Hashmatullah Shaidi 76 (57); Basir Ahamad 3/24 (4 overs)		Kamal Singh Airee 20 (21); Durgesh Gupta 2/13 (3 overs)

Far West United won by 83 runs
TU Cricket Ground, Kirtipur
Umpires: Himal Giri & Sanjay Gurung
Player of the match: Hashmatullah Shahidi (FWU)

- Far West United won the toss and elected to bat.

Match 27
6 January 2023
09:00
Scorecard

Janakpur Royals; 159/6 (17 overs)	v	Lumbini All Stars; 136/7 (17 overs)
Trevon Griffith 47 (11); Sagar Dhakal 2/17 (4 overs)		Anil Sah 35 (21); Trevon Griffith 3/30 (4 overs)

Janakpur Royals own by 23 runs
TU Cricket Ground, Kirtipur
Umpires: Himal Giri & Vinay Kumar Jha
Player of the match: Trevon Griffith (JKR)

- Lumbini All Stars won the toss and elected to field.
- The match was reduced to 17 overs per side due to rain.

Match 28
6 January 2023
13:00
Scorecard

Biratnagar Super Kings; 147/6 (20 overs)	v	Far West United; 144/9 (20 overs)
Hussain Talat 50 (29); Umair Ali 2/15 (4 overs)		Hashmatullah Shaidi 58 (46); Raj Nannan 3/32 (4 overs)

Biratnagar Super Kings won by 3 runs
TU Cricket Ground, Kirtipur
Umpires: Durga Subedi & Ram Yadav
Player of the match: Raj Nannan (BSK)

- Biratnagar Super Kings won the toss and elected to bat.

Match 29
7 January 2023
09:00
Scorecard

Kathmandu Knights; 154/6 (20 overs)	v	Biratnagar Super Kings; 160/3 (20 overs)
Alex Blake 34 (26); Raj Nannan 4/13 (4 overs)		Rohit Paudel 66 (42); Abinash Bohara 2/35 (3.4 overs)

Biratnagar Super Kings won by 7 wickets
TU Cricket Ground, Kirtipur
Umpires: Ram Pandey & Sanjay Gurung
Player of the match: Rohit Paudel (BSK)

- Kathmandu Knights won the toss and elected to bat.

Match 30
7 January 2023
13:00
Scorecard

Far West United; 187/5 (20 overs)	v	Pokhara Avengers; 146 (18.1 overs)
Hashmatullah Shahidi 67 (51); Abhimanyu Mithun 2/32 (4 overs)		Upul Tharanga 36 (23); Durgesh Gupta 3/29 (4 overs)

Far West United won by 41 runs
TU Cricket Ground, Kirtipur
Umpires: Durga Subedi & Vinay Kumar Jha
Player of the match: Hashmatullah Shahidi (FWU)

- Far West United won the toss and elected to bat.

== Playoff stage ==
Semifinals
8 January
1	Lumbini All Stars	143/8 (20 overs)
2	Janakpur Royals	137/7 (20 overs)
9 January
3	Biratnagar Super Kings	182/6 (20 overs)
4	Kathmandu Knights	83 (12.4 overs)

Preliminary final
10 January
2	Janakpur Royals	128 (19.1 overs)
3	Biratnagar Super Kings	167/6 (20 overs)

Final
11 January
1	Lumbini All Stars	133 (19.2 overs)
3	Biratnagar Super Kings	109/8 (20 overs)

=== Preliminary ===
==== Qualifier 1 ====
Match 31
8 January 2023
13:15
Scorecard

Lumbini All Stars; 143/8 (20 overs)	v	Janakpur Royals; 137/7 (20 overs)
Ishan Pandey 38 (39); Sompal Kami 2/19 (4 overs)		Samiullah Shinwari 45 (31); Dipendra Singh Airee 2/9 (3 overs)

Lumbini All Stars won by 6 runs
TU Cricket Ground, Kirtipur
Umpires: Sanjay Gurung & Vinay Kumar Jha
Player of the match: Bipul Sharma (LAS)

- Janakpur Royals won the toss and elected to field.

==== Eliminator ====
Match 32
9 January 2022
13:15
Scorecard

Biratnagar Super Kings; 182/6 (20 overs)	v	Kathmandu Knights; 83 (12.4 overs)
Rohit Paudel 61 (49); Kamal Singh Airee 2/35 (4 overs)		Abinash Bohara 16* (4); Surya Tamang 4/14 (2.4 overs)

Biratnagar Super Kings won by 99 runs
TU Cricket Ground, Kirtipur
Umpires: Durga Subedi & Vinay Kumar Jha
Player of the match: Rohit Paudel (BSK)

- Biratnagar Super Kings won the toss and elected to bat.

==== Qualifier 2 ====
Match 33
10 January 2023
13:15
Scorecard

Biratnagar Super Kings; 167/6 (20 overs)	v	Janakpur Royals; 128 (19.1 overs)
Gauranshu Sharma 42 (41); Jitendra Mukhiya 2/38(4 overs)		Chadwick Walton 51 (47); Keon Joseph 3/27 (4 overs)

Biratnagar Super Kings won by 39 runs
TU Cricket Ground, Kirtipur
Umpires: Durga Nath Subedi & Sanjay Gurung
Player of the match: Raj Nannan (BSK)

- Biratnagar Super Kings won the toss and elected to bat.

=== Final ===
Match 34
11 January 2023
13:15
Scorecard

Lumbini All Stars; 133 (19.2 overs)	v	Biratnagar Super Kings; 109/8 (20 overs)
Lahiru Milantha 41 (28); Nandan Yadav 2/22 (3.2 overs)		Arjun Saud 34 (40); Harmeet Singh 2/16 (4 overs)

Lumbini All Stars won by 24 runs
TU Cricket Ground, Kirtipur
Umpires: Sanjay Gurung and Vinay Kumar
Player of the match: Harmeet Singh (Lumbini All Stars)

- Lumbini All Stars won the toss and elected to bat.

== Statistics and awards ==
Most runs
Player	Team	Runs
Hashmatullah Shahidi	Far West United	400
Hussain Talat	Biratnagar Super Kings	367
Lahiru Milantha	Lumbini All Stars	349
Rohit Paudel	Biratnagar Super Kings	348
Chadwick Walton	Janakpur Royals	329

- Source: ESPNCricinfo

Most wickets
Player	Team	Wickets
Abinash Bohara	Kathmandu Knights	19
Raj Rocky Nannan	Biratnagar Super Kings	16
Lalit Rajbanshi	Janakpur Royals	16
Nandan Yadav	Biratnagar Super Kings	16
Karan KC	Far West United	14

- Source: ESPNCricinfo

=== End of season awards ===
Award	Name	Team	Prize
Player of the tournament	Hussain Talat	Biratnagar Super Kings	रू500,000
Best batsman	Hashmatullah Shahidi	Far Western United	रू250,000
Best bowler	Abinash Bohara	Kathmandu Knights	रू250,000
Emerging player	Surya Tamang	Biratnagar Super Kings	रू180,000

- Source: ESPNcricinfo

== Controversies ==
=== Non-payments ===
The match between Kathmandu Knights and Biratnagar Super Kings on 3 January was delayed by two hours after players refused to take the field due to not having been paid. Players were contracted to receive 40% of their payment before the start of the tournament and the remaining 60% during the tournament. Only Pokhara Avengers and Lumbini All Stars had been paid anything. The game resumed after CAN officials guaranteed payments.

=== Spot-fixing ===
Kathmandu Knights captain Gyanendra Malla revealed on 4 January that one of his teammates had been approached for match-fixing. The incident was reported to the ICC's Anti-Corruption Unit, following which a team was sent to Nepal to investigate the claims. The Central Investigation Bureau also formed specialized teams to invesitgate the incident. The investigation found evidence that Seven3Sports, the company organizing the event, were involved in the incident, with up to seven players potentially involved.
