= West Indies A cricket team in Nepal in 2024 =

International cricket tour

	Nepal	West Indies A
- Dates: 27 April – 4 May 2024
Captains	Rohit Paudel (Note: Dipendra Singh Airee captained Nepal in the 3rd unofficial T20I.)	Roston Chase

Twenty20 International series
- Results: West Indies A won the 5-match series 3–2
Most runs	Rohit Paudel (265)	Johnson Charles (212)
Most wickets	Sagar Dhakal (6)	Obed McCoy (8)
- Player of the series: Rohit Paudel (Nepal)

The West Indies A cricket team toured Nepal in April and May 2024 to play five T20I matches against Nepal. This tour also marks the first tour to Nepal by any West Indian representative team. The series was part of Nepal's preparation for the 2024 ICC Men's T20 World Cup.

== Squads ==
Nepal	(Cricket West Indies) West Indies A
Rohit Paudel (c); Dipendra Singh Airee; Kamal Singh Airee; Binod Bhandari (wk); Kushal Bhurtel; Abinash Bohara; Lokesh Bam; Aakash Chand; Sagar Dhakal; Pratis GC; Gulsan Jha; Sundeep Jora; Sompal Kami; Karan KC; Kushal Malla; Lalit Rajbanshi; Anil Sah (wk); Aarif Sheikh; Aasif Sheikh (wk); Bibek Yadav	Roston Chase (c); Alick Athanaze (vc); Fabian Allen; Kadeem Alleyne; Joshua Bishop; Keacy Carty; Johnson Charles; Mark Deyal; Andre Fletcher (wk); Matthew Forde; Obed McCoy; Gudakesh Motie; Keemo Paul; Oshane Thomas; Hayden Walsh Jr.

On 26 April 2024 Nepal added Kamal Singh Airee, Binod Bhandari, Lokesh Bam and Sagar Dhakal to the 20 men’s squad.

== Unofficial T20I series ==
=== 1st unofficial T20I ===
27 April 2024
12:15
Scorecard

West Indies A (Cricket West Indies); 204/5 (20 overs)	v	Nepal; 206/6 (19.4 overs)
Roston Chase 74 (46); Abinash Bohara 1/28 (4 overs)		Rohit Paudel 112 (54); Obed McCoy 2/34 (4 overs)

Nepal won by 4 wickets
Tribhuvan University International Cricket Ground, Kirtipur
Umpires: Vinay Kumar Jha (Nep) and Durga Subedi (Nep)
Player of the match: Rohit Paudel (Nep)

- Nepal won the toss and elected to field.
- Rohit Paudel (Nep) scored his first century in T20s.

=== 2nd unofficial T20I ===
28 April 2024
12:15
Scorecard

West Indies A (Cricket West Indies); 160/7 (20 overs)	v	Nepal; 150/9 (20 overs)
Andre Fletcher 43 (36); Sagar Dhakal 2/19 (4 overs)		Rohit Paudel 71* (48); Gudakesh Motie 2/22 (4 overs)

West Indies A won by 10 runs
Tribhuvan University International Cricket Ground, Kirtipur
Umpires: Himal Giri (Nep) and Sanjay Gurung (Nep)
Player of the match: Gudakesh Motie (West Indies A)

- West Indies A won the toss and elected to bat.

=== 3rd unofficial T20I ===
1 May 2024
12:15
Scorecard

West Indies A (Cricket West Indies); 227/3 (20 overs)	v	Nepal; 151 (19.2 overs)
Johnson Charles 119* (61); Sagar Dhakal 1/41 (4 overs)		Karan KC 28 (17); Hayden Walsh Jr. 3/28 (4 overs)

West Indies A won by 76 runs
Tribhuvan University International Cricket Ground, Kirtipur
Umpires: Sanjay Gurung (Nep) and Buddhi Pradhan (Nep)
Player of the match: Johnson Charles (West Indies A)

- West Indies A won the toss and elected to bat.

=== 4th unofficial T20I ===
2 May 2024
12:15
Scorecard

West Indies A (Cricket West Indies); 209/3 (20 overs)	v	Nepal; 181 (20 overs)
Andre Fletcher 84* (54); Kushal Bhurtel 2/23 (4 overs)		Rohit Paudel 82 (47); Matthew Forde 3/25 (4 overs)

West Indies A won by 28 runs
Tribhuvan University International Cricket Ground, Kirtipur
Umpires: Sanjay Gurung (Nep) and Vinay Kumar Jha (Nep)
Player of the match: Andre Fletcher (West Indies A)

- West Indies A won the toss and elected to bat.

=== 5th unofficial T20I ===
4 May 2024
12:15
Scorecard

West Indies A (Cricket West Indies); 172/7 (20 overs)	v	Nepal; 173/4 (18.5 overs)
Alick Athanaze 42* (29); Sompal Kami 3/16 (4 overs)		Anil Sah 58 (45); Obed McCoy 3/36 (3.5 overs)

Nepal won by 6 wickets
Tribhuvan University International Cricket Ground, Kirtipur
Umpires: Vinay Kumar Jha (Nep) and Buddhi Pradhan (Nep)
Player of the match: Sagar Dhakal (Nep)

- West Indies A won the toss and elected to bat.
