= 2023 KP Oli Cup squads =

Cricket teams in Nepal

Twelve teams participated in the 2023 KP Oli Cup, the Twenty20 cricket tournament in Nepal, where seven of them were Provincial teams, three departmental teams and two organizer teams.

== APF Club ==
- Pradeep Airee (c)
- Aasif Sheikh (vc)(wk)
- Sundeep Jora
- Lokesh Bam
- Sumit Maharjan
- Aayushman Bam
- Yagyaman Kumal
- Irshad Ahamad
- Bhuvan Karki
- Amar Singh Rautela
- Abinash Bohara
- Mousom Dhakal
- Puran BK
- Arun Airee

== Bagmati Province ==
- Sandeep Lamichhane (c)
- Gaurav Khadka (wk)
- Shubh Kansakar
- Aashutosh Ghiraiya
- Rit Gautam
- Roshan BK
- Pratik Shrestha
- Sonu Devkota
- Ishan Pandey
- Subash Khatri
- Pratis GC
- Rijan Dhakal
- Ram Naresh Giri
- Dipesh Shrestha

== Gandaki Province ==
- Bipin Khatri (c)
- Sameer Kandel (wk)
- Robin Timilsina
- Gaurav VK
- Kiran Paudel
- Muskan Thapa
- Karan Pangeni
- Avishek Thapa
- Sandeep Chhetri Khatri
- Amrit Gurung
- Dinesh Buddha Magar
- Kamal Pariyar
- Sudip Aryal
- Chandrakanth Paudel

== Karnali Province ==
- Aawash Shah
- Dinesh Adhikari
- Anuj Chanara
- Chandra BC
- Diwan Pun
- Arjun Gharti
- Prakash Jaishi
- Mohan BK
- Nischal Rawal
- Dipendra Rawat
- Raj Shah
- Himanshu Shahi
- Bipin Shahi
- Rabindra Shahi
- Manish Thapa
- Utkarsh BK

== Koshi Province ==
- Ankit Subedi (c)
- Minash Thapa (wk)
- Sonu Ansari
- Samir Karki
- Mukund Yadav
- Sarwan Yadav
- Kamal Khatri
- Firdosh Ansari
- Sonu Mandal
- Prakash Karki
- Sujan Thapaliya

== Lumbini Province ==
- Krishna Karki (c)
- Sushant Singh Thapa
- Birat Bhandari
- Mrinal Gurung
- Manish Thapa
- Mahesh Rana
- Sumit Newar
- Dhurba Sunar
- Ajay Kumar Luniya
- Abhishesh Gautam
- Ramesh Kurmi
- Roshan Lal Gupta
- Mohammed Hussain
- Nar Bahadur Sharki

== Madan Bhandari Sports Academy Blue ==
- Nirbhik Pathak (c)
- Mehool Shrestha
- Ronim Tiwary
- Arjun Rupmajhi
- Kaushal Rupakheti
- Dayanand Mandal
- Subham Khanal
- Dinesh Subedi
- Ranbir Yadav
- Shankar Paudel
- Jamesh Mandal
- Dhawan Sahani
- Abhay Yadav

== Madan Bhandari Sports Academy Red ==
- Amar Mishra (c)
- Ankit BM
- Arif Khan
- Mahesh Bhar
- Biprason KC
- Roshan Gautam
- Nischal Gyawati
- Sandeep Mourya
- Bijay Prajapati
- Sumit Parajuli
- Sandesh Thapa
- Shezad Alam
- Nirmal Thapa
- Santosh Yadav

== Madhesh Province ==
- Harishankar Shah (c)
- Imran Sheikh
- Mayan Yadav
- Anil Kumar Sha (wk)
- Pawan Sarraf
- Rakesh Kamat
- Bishal Susling
- Rohan BK
- Bishal Patel
- Partiv Yadav
- Rupesh Singh
- Samsad Ansari
- Pardip Paswan
- Himansu Dutta

== Nepal Police Club ==
- Aarif Sheikh (c)
- Arjun Saud (wk)
- Amit Shrestha
- Prem Tamang
- Sunil Dhamala
- Kushal Bhurtel
- Shankar Rana
- Karan KC
- Lalit Rajbanshi
- Dlip Nath (wk)
- Sagar Dhakal
- Rashid Khan
- Nabin Thapa
- Roshan Budhal

== Sudurpashchim Province ==
- Raju Rijal (c)
- Narayan Joshi
- Basant Singh Karki
- Khadak Bohara
- Kiran Thagunna
- Gajendra Bohara
- Ayub Chand
- Bikash Agri
- Bhoraj Bhatta
- Suraj Tiruwa
- Basant Khatri
- Kailash Ayer
- Narendra Saud
- Abhishek Pal

== Tribhuwan Army Club ==
- Binod Bhandari (c)
- Avinash Karn
- Rajesh Pulami
- Jitendra Mukhiya
- Sompal Kami
- Bhim Sharki
- Rohit Paudel
- Shahab Alam
- Kushal Malla
- Sandeep Rajali
- Bibek Yadav
- Basir Ahamad
- Santosh Karki
- Pawan Karki
