= Emirati cricket team in Nepal in 2022–23 =

International cricket tour

	Nepal	United Arab Emirates
- Dates: 14 – 18 November 2022
Captains	Rohit Paudel	Chundangapoyil Rizwan

One Day International series
- Results: Nepal won the 3-match series 2–1
Most runs	Aasif Sheikh (106)	Muhammad Waseem (105)
Most wickets	Gulsan Jha (5); Sompal Kami (5)	Aayan Afzal Khan (5)
- Player of the series: Aayan Afzal Khan (UAE)

The United Arab Emirates national cricket team toured Nepal in mid-November 2022 to play three One Day International (ODI) matches. All three matches were played at the Tribhuvan University International Cricket Ground. The series provided Nepal with preparation for a tri-series in Namibia in December 2022, part of Cricket World Cup League 2.

The hosts were outplayed in the first ODI, falling to a defeat by 84 runs. Nepal levelled the series by winning the second ODI by three wickets, with a 62-run stand between Aarif Sheikh and Gulsan Jha for the seventh wicket helping them recover from a top order collapse. Nepal won the third ODI by 6 wickets, Aasif Sheikh scoring 88 not out in the successful chase, to seal their first victory in a home bilateral ODI series.

== Squads ==
Nepal	United Arab Emirates
Rohit Paudel (c); Mohammad Aadil Alam; Dipendra Singh Airee; Kamal Singh Airee; Kushal Bhurtel; Sagar Dhakal; Gulsan Jha; Sompal Kami; Karan KC; Gyanendra Malla; Lalit Rajbanshi; Arjun Saud (wk); Harishankar Shah; Bhim Sharki; Aarif Sheikh; Aasif Sheikh (wk)	Chundangapoyil Rizwan (c); Sabir Ali; Vriitya Aravind (wk); Hazrat Bilal; Basil Hameed; Aayan Afzal Khan; Zahoor Khan; Rohan Mustafa; Ahmed Raza; Alishan Sharafu; Adhitya Shetty; Junaid Siddique; Vishnu Sukumaran; Ashwant Valthapa; Muhammad Waseem

== ODI series ==
=== 1st ODI ===
14 November 2022
09:00
Scorecard

United Arab Emirates; 263/7 (50 overs)	v	Nepal; 179/9 (50 overs)
Rohan Mustafa 53 (73); Gulsan Jha 2/26 (6 overs)		Dipendra Singh Airee 54 (84); Aayan Afzal Khan 4/14 (10 overs)

United Arab Emirates won by 84 runs
Tribhuvan University International Cricket Ground, Kirtipur
Umpires: Buddhi Pradhan (Nep) and Masudur Rahman (Ban)
Player of the match: Aayan Afzal Khan (UAE)

- Nepal won the toss and elected to field.
- Arjun Saud, Harishankar Shah (Nep), Hazrat Bilal and Aayan Afzal Khan (UAE) all made their ODI debuts.

=== 2nd ODI ===
16 November 2022
09:00
Scorecard

United Arab Emirates; 191 (43.2 overs)	v	Nepal; 193/7 (47.5 overs)
Muhammad Waseem 50 (46); Sompal Kami 3/35 (7.2 overs)		Gulsan Jha 37 (49); Rohan Mustafa 3/24 (10 overs)

Nepal won by 3 wickets
Tribhuvan University International Cricket Ground, Kirtipur
Umpires: Vinay Kumar Jha (Nep) and Masudur Rahman (Ban)
Player of the match: Gulsan Jha (Nep)

- United Arab Emirates won the toss and elected to bat.
- Vishnu Sukumaran (UAE) made his ODI debut.

=== 3rd ODI ===
18 November 2022
09:00
Scorecard

United Arab Emirates; 176/9 (50 overs)	v	Nepal; 180/4 (40.1 overs)
Aayan Afzal Khan 54* (63); Dipendra Singh Airee 2/22 (10 overs)		Aasif Sheikh 88* (119); Aayan Afzal Khan 1/27 (10 overs)

Nepal won by 6 wickets
Tribhuvan University International Cricket Ground, Kirtipur
Umpires: Masudur Rahman (Ban) and Buddhi Pradhan (Nep)
Player of the match: Aasif Sheikh (Nep)

- Nepal won the toss and elected to field.
