= 2021–22 Nepal T20I Tri-Nation Series =

International cricket tournament

The 2021–22 Nepal T20I Tri-Nation Series was a Twenty20 International (T20I) cricket tournament that took place in Nepal from 28 March to 4 April 2022. The participating teams were the hosts Nepal along with Malaysia and Papua New Guinea. The matches were played at the Tribhuvan University International Cricket Ground in Kirtipur. On 12 March 2022, the Cricket Association of Nepal (CAN) confirmed all the fixtures.

Before the tri-nation series, Nepal played two One Day International (ODI) matches against Papua New Guinea. Papua New Guinea won both of the matches, winning by six runs in the first ODI and by three wickets in the second one. In the tri-nation series, Nepal became the first team to qualify for the final, after winning their first three matches. Papua New Guinea joined Nepal in the final of the tri-series, after Malaysia lost heavily to Nepal in the final round-robin match. Nepal defeated Papua New Guinea in the final by 50 runs to win the tournament with a 100% winning record. Nepal's Dipendra Singh Airee, who was named player of match in the final for an all-round display in which he scored a half-century and took 4 wickets, was also named player of the series.

== ODI series ==
Papua New Guinea cricket team in Nepal in 2021–22
	Nepal	Papua New Guinea
- Dates: 25 – 26 March 2022
Captains	Sandeep Lamichhane	Assad Vala

One Day International series
- Results: Papua New Guinea won the 2-match series 2–0
Most runs	Rohit Paudel (161)	Charles Amini (112)
Most wickets	Sompal Kami (5)	Norman Vanua (5)
- Player of the series: Charles Amini (PNG)

=== Squads ===
Nepal	Papua New Guinea
Sandeep Lamichhane (c); Dipendra Singh Airee; Kamal Singh Airee; Sushan Bhari; Kushal Bhurtel; Sagar Dhakal; Gulsan Jha; Sompal Kami; Dev Khanal; Rohit Paudel; Anil Sah (wk); Pawan Sarraf; Bhim Sharki; Aarif Sheikh; Bikram Sob	Assad Vala (c); Charles Amini; Simon Atai (wk); Dogodo Bau (wk); Sese Bau; Riley Hekure; Hiri Hiri; Semo Kamea; Jason Kila; Kabua Morea; Alei Nao; Nosaina Pokana; Lega Siaka; Chad Soper; Tony Ura; Norman Vanua

=== 1st ODI ===
25 March 2022
09:00
Scorecard

Papua New Guinea; 292/8 (50 overs)	v	Nepal; 286/8 (50 overs)
Charles Amini 77 (103); Dipendra Singh Airee 2/30 (10 overs)		Rohit Paudel 126 (107); Norman Vanua 3/62 (10 overs)

Papua New Guinea won by 6 runs
Tribhuvan University International Cricket Ground, Kirtipur
Umpires: Durga Subedi (Nep) and Raveendra Wimalasiri (SL)
Player of the match: Charles Amini (PNG)

- Nepal won the toss and elected to field.
- Dev Khanal (Nep) and Semo Kamea (PNG) both made their ODI debuts.
- Rohit Paudel (Nep) scored his first century in ODIs.

=== 2nd ODI ===
26 March 2022
09:00
Scorecard

Nepal; 278/8 (50 overs)	v	Papua New Guinea; 283/7 (48.4 overs)
Dipendra Singh Airee 105 (140); Alei Nao 3/48 (9 overs)		Lega Siaka 90 (102); Sompal Kami 3/38 (9 overs)

Papua New Guinea won by 3 wickets
Tribhuvan University International Cricket Ground, Kirtipur
Umpires: Vinay Kumar Jha (Nep) and Raveendra Wimalasiri (SL)
Player of the match: Lega Siaka (PNG)

- Nepal won the toss and elected to bat.
- Dipendra Singh Airee (Nep) scored his first century in ODIs.

== T20I tri-nation series ==
2021–22 Nepal Tri-Nation Series
- Date: 28 March – 4 April 2022
- Location: Nepal
- Result: Nepal won the tournament
- Player of the series: (Nepal) Dipendra Singh Airee
Teams
Malaysia	Nepal	Papua New Guinea
Captains
Ahmad Faiz	Sandeep Lamichhane	Assad Vala
Most runs
Ahmad Faiz (176)	Dipendra Singh Airee (255)	Tony Ura (190)
Most wickets
Pavandeep Singh (6)	Karan KC (13)	Kabua Morea (8)

=== Squads ===
Malaysia	Nepal	Papua New Guinea
Ahmad Faiz (c); Muhammad Amir; Syed Aziz; Ainool Hafizs; Ammar Zuhdi Hazalan (wk); Syazrul Idrus; Sharvin Muniandy; Nazril Rahman; Pavandeep Singh; Virandeep Singh; Muhamad Syahadat; Vijay Unni; Muhammad Wafiq; Zubaidi Zulkifle	Sandeep Lamichhane (c); Dipendra Singh Airee; Kamal Singh Airee; Mohammad Aadil Alam; Lokesh Bam; Kushal Bhurtel; Abinash Bohara; Sagar Dhakal; Sompal Kami; Karan KC; Kushal Malla; Dilip Nath; Rohit Paudel; Aarif Sheikh; Aasif Sheikh (wk); Bibek Yadav	Assad Vala (c); Charles Amini; Simon Atai (wk); Dogodo Bau; Sese Bau; Riley Hekure; Hiri Hiri; Semo Kamea; Jason Kila; Kabua Morea; Alei Nao; Nosaina Pokana; Lega Siaka; Chad Soper; Tony Ura; Norman Vanua

Nepal added Rohit Paudel to their T20I squad on 28 March 2022.

=== Round-robin ===
Pos	Team	Pld	W	L	NR	Pts	NRR
1	Nepal	4	4	0	0	8	2.530
2	Papua New Guinea	4	1	3	0	2	−0.467
3	Malaysia	4	1	3	0	2	−2.094

Source: ESPN Cricinfo

28 March 2022
12:30
Scorecard

Nepal; 183/9 (20 overs)	v	Papua New Guinea; 168 (19.2 overs)
Aasif Sheikh 43 (35); Chad Soper 2/24 (4 overs)		Norman Vanua 52 (29); Sandeep Lamichhane 3/22 (4 overs)

Nepal won by 15 runs
Tribhuvan University International Cricket Ground, Kirtipur
Umpires: Vinay Kumar Jha (Nep) and Buddhi Pradhan (Nep)
Player of the match: Sandeep Lamichhane (Nep)

- Papua New Guinea won the toss and elected to field.

29 March 2022
12:30
Scorecard

Malaysia; 180/3 (20 overs)	v	Papua New Guinea; 172 (19.3 overs)
Virandeep Singh 59* (52); Norman Vanua 2/31 (4 overs)		Tony Ura 56 (35); Sharvin Muniandy 4/32 (3.3 overs)

Malaysia won by 8 runs
Tribhuvan University International Cricket Ground, Kirtipur
Umpires: Vinay Kumar Jha (Nep) and Durga Subedi (Nep)
Player of the match: Sharvin Muniandy (Mas)

- Malaysia won the toss and elected to bat.
- Ammar Zuhdi Hazalan and Vijay Unni (Mas) both made their T20I debuts.

30 March 2022
12:30
Scorecard

Malaysia; 114/8 (20 overs)	v	Nepal; 117/4 (13.4 overs)
Zubaidi Zulkifle 32 (15); Karan KC 2/16 (3 overs)		Aasif Sheikh 57 (38); Pavandeep Singh 2/23 (3 overs)

Nepal won by 6 wickets
Tribhuvan University International Cricket Ground, Kirtipur
Umpires: Buddhi Pradhan (Nep) and Durga Subedi (Nep)
Player of the match: Aasif Sheikh (Nep)

- Malaysia won the toss and elected to bat.
- Dilip Nath (Nep) made his T20I debut.

31 March 2022
12:30
Scorecard

Nepal; 203/7 (20 overs)	v	Papua New Guinea; 166 (19.4 overs)
Dipendra Singh Airee 66 (33); Kabua Morea 3/29 (4 overs)		Charles Amini 62 (47); Karan KC 5/21 (3.4 overs)

Nepal won by 37 runs
Tribhuvan University International Cricket Ground, Kirtipur
Umpires: Vinay Kumar Jha (Nep) and Buddhi Pradhan (Nep)
Player of the match: Karan KC (Nep)

- Papua New Guinea won the toss and elected to field.
- Mohammad Aadil Alam (Nep) made his T20I debut.
- Karan KC became the first bowler for Nepal to take a hat-trick in T20Is and take a five-wicket haul in T20Is.

1 April 2022
12:30
Scorecard

Malaysia; 196/6 (20 overs)	v	Papua New Guinea; 199/2 (17.5 overs)
Syed Aziz 64 (35); Kabua Morea 4/29 (3 overs)		Tony Ura 86* (34); Syazrul Idrus 1/34 (4 overs); Muhammad Wafiq 1/34 (4 overs)

Papua New Guinea won by 8 wickets
Tribhuvan University International Cricket Ground, Kirtipur
Umpires: Vinay Kumar Jha (Nep) and Durga Subedi (Nep)
Player of the match: Tony Ura (PNG)

- Papua New Guinea won the toss and elected to field.
- Semo Kamea (PNG) made his T20I debut.

2 April 2022
12:30
Scorecard

Nepal; 223/5 (20 overs)	v	Malaysia; 138 (19.5 overs)
Dipendra Singh Airee 110* (57); Pavandeep Singh 1/34 (4 overs)		Virandeep Singh 47 (26); Sandeep Lamichhane 3/19 (4 overs)

Nepal won by 85 runs
Tribhuvan University International Cricket Ground, Kirtipur
Umpires: Buddhi Pradhan (Nep) and Durga Subedi (Nep)
Player of the match: Dipendra Singh Airee (Nep)

- Malaysia won the toss and elected to field.
- Dipendra Singh Airee (Nep) scored his first century in T20Is.

=== Final ===
4 April 2022
12:30
Scorecard

Nepal; 168/6 (20 overs)	v	Papua New Guinea; 118 (16.1 overs)
Dipendra Singh Airee 54* (38); Semo Kamea 3/28 (4 overs)		Sese Bau 59 (38); Dipendra Singh Airee 4/18 (4 overs)

Nepal won by 50 runs
Tribhuvan University International Cricket Ground, Kirtipur
Umpires: Vinay Kumar Jha (Nep) and Buddhi Pradhan (Nep)
Player of the match: Dipendra Singh Airee (Nep)

- Papua New Guinea won the toss and elected to field.
- Dipendra Singh Airee (Nep) scored his 1,000th run in T20Is.
