= Canadian cricket team in Nepal in 2023–24 =

International cricket tour

Canada men's cricket team in Nepal in 2023–24
	Nepal	Canada
- Dates: 8 – 12 February 2024
Captains	Rohit Paudel	Saad Bin Zafar

One Day International series
- Results: Nepal won the 3-match series 3–0
Most runs	Anil Sah (162)	Navneet Dhaliwal (102)
Most wickets	Rohit Paudel (6)	Ishwarjot Sohi (4)
- Player of the series: Rohit Paudel (Nep)

The Canada men's cricket team toured Nepal in February 2024 to play three One Day International (ODI) matches against Nepal. For Nepal, the series provided the preparation for the 2024 Nepal Tri-Nation Series. In January 2024, the Cricket Association of Nepal announced the bilateral series as a part of Nepal's cricket calendar for 2024.

== Squads ==
Nepal	Canada
Rohit Paudel (c); Kushal Bhurtel; Aakash Chand; Rijan Dhakal; Hemant Dhami; Sompal Kami; Dev Khanal; Kushal Malla; Lalit Rajbanshi; Anil Sah (wk); Pawan Sarraf; Bhim Sharki; Aarif Sheikh; Aasif Sheikh (wk); Surya Tamang	Saad Bin Zafar (c); Shahid Ahmadzai; Dilpreet Bajwa; Uday Bhagwan; Navneet Dhaliwal; Nikhil Dutta; Dillon Heyliger; Aaron Johnson; Nicholas Kirton; Shreyas Movva (wk); Kaleem Sana; Pargat Singh; Ishwarjot Sohi; Harsh Thaker; Srimantha Wijeratne (wk)

== ODI series ==
=== 1st ODI ===
8 February 2024
09:15
Scorecard

Nepal; 224 (50 overs)	v	Canada; 217 (47.5 overs)
Kushal Bhurtel 62 (58); Uday Bhagwan 3/40 (8 overs)		Nicholas Kirton 68 (99); Rohit Paudel 4/22 (8.5 overs)

Nepal won by 7 runs
Tribhuvan University International Cricket Ground, Kirtipur
Umpires: Lyndon Hannibal (SL) and Vinay Kumar Jha (Nep)
Player of the match: Rohit Paudel (Nep)

- Nepal won the toss and elected to bat.
- Rijan Dhakal, Surya Tamang (Nep) Shahid Ahmadzai, Uday Bhagwan, Navneet Dhaliwal, Shreyas Movva and Ishwarjot Sohi (Can) all made their ODI debuts.

=== 2nd ODI ===
10 February 2024
09:15
Scorecard

Canada; 285/9 (50 overs)	v	Nepal; 287/6 (45.1 overs)
Aaron Johnson 65 (62); Rohit Paudel 2/32 (8 overs)		Rohit Paudel 87 (101); Ishwarjot Sohi 2/48 (7 overs)

Nepal won by 4 wickets
Tribhuvan University International Cricket Ground, Kirtipur
Umpires: Lyndon Hannibal (SL) and Durga Subedi (Nep)
Player of the match: Rohit Paudel (Nep)

- Canada won the toss and elected to bat.
- Aakash Chand (Nep) and Dilpreet Bajwa (Can) both made their ODI debuts.
- Anil Sah scored the fastest fifty by a Nepalese cricketer, in terms of number of balls faced in an ODI (19).
- This was the joint highest successful run chase in ODIs by Nepal.

=== 3rd ODI ===
12 February 2024
09:15
Scorecard

Canada; 232/8 (50 overs)	v	Nepal; 234/1 (44.3 overs)
Navneet Dhaliwal 50 (82); Hemant Dhami 3/49 (8 overs)		Anil Sah 112* (124); Dillon Heyliger 1/31 (6 overs)

Nepal won by 9 wickets
Tribhuvan University International Cricket Ground, Kirtipur
Umpires: Lyndon Hannibal (SL) and Vinay Kumar Jha (Nep)
Player of the match: Anil Sah (Nep)

- Nepal won the toss and elected to field.
- Hemant Dhami (Nep) made his ODI debut.
- Anil Sah and Bhim Sharki (Nep) both scored their first centuries in ODIs.

== 50-over series ==
After the ODI series, the Canadian team played three unofficial one-day matches against Nepal A. The visitors won this unofficial series 2–1.

=== 1st 50-over match ===
18 February 2024
09:30
Scorecard

Nepal A 216/8 (50 overs)	v	Canada XI; 218/6 (49.3 overs)
Basir Ahamad 50* (55); Saad Bin Zafar 3/30 (10 overs)		Navneet Dhaliwal 80 (76); Shahab Alam 2/31 (10 overs)

Canada XI won by 4 wickets
Mulpani International Cricket Ground, Kageshwari-Manohara
Player of the match: Navneet Dhaliwal (Canada XI)

- Canada XI won the toss and elected to field.

=== 2nd 50-over match ===
20 February 2024
09:30
Scorecard

Canada XI; 240 (49.5 overs)	v	Nepal A 241/8 (49.1 overs)
Shreyas Movva 68 (82); Shahab Alam 3/38 (10 overs)		Sandeep Jora 66 (74); Ammor Khalid 2/35 (7 overs)

Nepal A won by 2 wickets
Mulpani International Cricket Ground, Kageshwari-Manohara
Player of the match: Basir Ahamad (Nepal A)

- Nepal A won the toss and elected to field.

=== 3rd 50-over match ===
22 February 2024
09:30
Scorecard

Nepal A 181 (47 overs)	v	Canada XI; 182/6 (38.5 overs)
Aashutosh Ghiraiya 28 (43); Dillon Heyliger 2/28 (8 overs)		Nicholas Kirton 58* (79); Shahab Alam 4/35 (10 overs)

Canada XI won by 4 wickets
Mulpani International Cricket Ground, Kageshwari-Manohara
Player of the match: Nicholas Kirton (Canada XI)

- Canada XI won the toss and elected to field.
