= Nepalese cricket team in Kenya in 2022 =

International cricket tour

	Kenya	Nepal
- Dates: 25 August – 5 September 2022
Captains	Shem Ngoche	Sandeep Lamichhane

Twenty20 International series
- Results: Nepal won the 5-match series 3–2
Most runs	Irfan Karim (139)	Rohit Paudel (156)
Most wickets	Vraj Patel (10)	Sandeep Lamichhane (12)
- Player of the series: Sandeep Lamichhane (Nep)

The Nepal national men's cricket team toured Kenya in August and September 2022 to play five Twenty20 International (T20I) matches and three 50-over matches. This was the first series led by Nepal's new head coach Manoj Prabhakar, after Pubudu Dassanayake resigned in July 2022. This series was the Nepal cricket team's first visit to Kenya. This was also the first international cricket series hosted at the Gymkhana Club Ground in 10 years.

Nepal won the opening fixture of the T20I series by five wickets, before the hosts levelled the series with an 18-run victory in the second match. Nepal regained the series lead with a narrow win with former captain Gyanendra Malla top-scoring performance with 46 in a successful run chase. Kenya again levelled the series, defending a score of just 101 to win the fourth match by 7 runs, despite Nepal's captain Sandeep Lamichhane earlier taking his first five-wicket haul in T20Is. Nepal won the final game by 31 runs to claim a 3–2 series victory. Sandeep Lamichhane was named player of the series after taking 12 wickets. This tournament marked the return of international cricket to Kenya after more than a decade. Mumbai based firm Sports and Media Works (SMW) were the commercial partners & producers of the event.

== Squads ==
Kenya	Nepal
Shem Ngoche (c); Sachin Bhudia; Emmanuel Bundi; Irfan Karim (wk); Alex Obanda; Collins Obuya; Eugene Ochieng; Nehemiah Odhiambo; Nelson Odhiambo; Lucas Oluoch; Elijah Otieno; Rakep Patel; Vraj Patel; Sukhdeep Singh	Sandeep Lamichhane (c); Rohit Paudel (vc); Basir Ahamad; Dipendra Singh Airee; Mohammad Aadil Alam; Shahab Alam; Sompal Kami; Karan KC; Dev Khanal; Kishore Mahato; Gyanendra Malla; Pawan Sarraf; Arjun Saud (wk); Aarif Sheikh; Aasif Sheikh (wk); Bibek Yadav

Nepal also named Pratis GC, Jitendra Mukhiya, Harishankar Shah and Bhim Sharki as reserves.

== T20I series ==
=== 1st T20I ===
25 August 2022
13:00
Scorecard

Kenya; 130/8 (20 overs)	v	Nepal; 133/5 (19.2 overs)
Irfan Karim 34 (44); Sompal Kami 3/22 (4 overs)		Dipendra Singh Airee 33 (24); Vraj Patel 2/19 (4 overs)

Nepal won by 5 wickets
Gymkhana Club Ground, Nairobi
Umpires: Charles Kariuki (Ken) and David Odhiambo (Ken)
Player of the match: Sompal Kami (Nep)

- Nepal won the toss and elected to field.

=== 2nd T20I ===
26 August 2022
13:00
Scorecard

Kenya; 132/9 (20 overs)	v	Nepal; 114 (19 overs)
Rakep Patel 35 (25); Dipendra Singh Airee 3/16 (3 overs)		Aarif Sheikh 25 (21); Vraj Patel 2/16 (3 overs)

Kenya won by 18 runs
Gymkhana Club Ground, Nairobi
Umpires: Charles Kariuki (Ken) and Nicholas Otieno (Ken)
Player of the match: Rakep Patel (Ken)

- Nepal won the toss and elected to field.
- Basir Ahamad (Nep) made his T20I debut.

=== 3rd T20I ===
28 August 2022
13:00
Scorecard

Kenya; 156/2 (20 overs)	v	Nepal; 160/6 (19.3 overs)
Rakep Patel 73* (43); Mohammad Aadil Alam 1/4 (1 over)		Gyanendra Malla 46 (41); Vraj Patel 2/22 (4 overs)

Nepal won by 4 wickets
Gymkhana Club Ground, Nairobi
Umpires: Rockie D'Mello (Ken) and Isaac Oyieko (Ken)
Player of the match: Gyanendra Malla (Nep)

- Kenya won the toss and elected to bat.
- Arjun Saud (Nep) made his T20I debut.

=== 4th T20I ===
29 August 2022
13:00
Scorecard

Kenya; 101 (20 overs)	v	Nepal; 94/9 (20 overs)
Lucas Oluoch 29 (18); Sandeep Lamichhane 5/9 (4 overs)		Rohit Paudel 47 (55); Rakep Patel 3/19 (4 overs)

Kenya won by 7 runs
Gymkhana Club Ground, Nairobi
Umpires: Joseph Karuri (Ken) and Shantilal Patel (Ken)
Player of the match: Shem Ngoche (Ken)

- Kenya won the toss and elected to bat.
- Sandeep Lamichhane (Nep) took his first five-wicket haul in T20Is.

=== 5th T20I ===
30 August 2022
13:00
Scorecard

Nepal; 175/7 (20 overs)	v	Kenya; 144/7 (20 overs)
Gyanendra Malla 59 (44); Nehemiah Odhiambo 2/19 (2 overs)		Nehemiah Odhiambo 37 (22); Sandeep Lamichhane 2/26 (4 overs)

Nepal won by 31 runs
Gymkhana Club Ground, Nairobi
Umpires: David Odhiambo (Ken) and Nicholas Otieno (Ken)
Player of the match: Gyanendra Malla (Nep)

- Nepal won the toss and elected to bat.

== 50-over series ==
=== 1st 50-over match ===
2 September 2022
09:30
Scorecard

Kenya; 218 (48.1 overs)	v	Nepal; 220/3 (47.2 overs)
Rakep Patel 67 (75); Sompal Kami 3/29 (10 overs)		Aasif Sheikh 110 (120); Collins Obuya 1/20 (4 overs)

Nepal won by 7 wickets
Gymkhana Club Ground, Nairobi
Umpires: Asgarali Kassam (Ken) and David Odhiambo (Ken)
Player of the match: Aasif Sheikh (Nep)

- Kenya won the toss and elected to bat.

=== 2nd 50-over match ===
3 September 2022
09:30
Scorecard

Nepal; 230 (49.2 overs)	v	Kenya; 213 (46.3 overs)
Rohit Paudel 78 (95); Vraj Patel 2/32 (10 overs)		Rakep Patel 81 (98); Dipendra Singh Airee 4/12 (5.3 overs)

Nepal won by 17 runs
Gymkhana Club Ground, Nairobi
Umpires: Rockie D'Mello (Ken) and Charles Kariuki (Ken)
Player of the match: Rohit Paudel (Nep)

- Nepal won the toss and elected to bat.

=== 3rd 50-over match ===
5 September 2022
09:30
Scorecard

Kenya; 255/9 (50 overs)	v	Nepal; 258/4 (47.1 overs)
Collins Obuya 84 (111); Sompal Kami 2/36 (10 overs)		Arjun Saud 58 (90); Vraj Patel 2/47 (10 overs)

Nepal won by 6 wickets
Gymkhana Club Ground, Nairobi
Umpires: Nicholas Otieno (Ken) and Shantilal Patel (Ken)
Player of the match: Collins Obuya (Ken)

- Kenya won the toss and elected to bat.
