= West Indian cricket team against Nepal in the UAE in 2025–26 =

International cricket tour

	Nepal	West Indies
- Dates: 27 – 30 September 2025
Captains	Rohit Paudel	Akeal Hosein

Twenty20 International series
- Results: Nepal won the 3-match series 2–1
Most runs	Sundeep Jora (86)	Amir Jangoo (109)
Most wickets	Kushal Bhurtel (5)	Jason Holder (5)
- Player of the series: Kushal Bhurtel (Nep)

The West Indies cricket team toured the United Arab Emirates in September 2025 to play against Nepal cricket team. The tour consisted of three Twenty20 International (T20I) matches. All the matches were played at the Sharjah Cricket Stadium. It was the first ever bilateral T20I series between the two teams. In June 2025, the Cricket Association of Nepal (CAN) confirmed the fixtures for the tour. The series was officially branded as the Unity Cup.

== Squads ==
Nepal	West Indies
Rohit Paudel (c); Dipendra Singh Airee (vc); Mohammad Aadil Alam; Shahab Alam; Lokesh Bam; Kushal Bhurtel; Gulshan Jha; Sundeep Jora; Sompal Kami; Karan KC; ~~Sandeep Lamichhane~~; Kushal Malla; Lalit Rajbanshi; Aarif Sheikh; Aasif Sheikh (wk); Nandan Yadav	Akeal Hosein (c); Fabian Allen; Jewel Andrew; Ackeem Auguste; Navin Bidaisee; Jediah Blades; Keacy Carty; Karima Gore; Jason Holder; Amir Jangoo (wk); Kyle Mayers; Obed McCoy; Zishan Motara; Ramon Simmonds; Shamar Springer

On 27 September, Sandeep Lamichhane withdrew himself from the 1st T20I. But later Cricket Association of Nepal suspended him from last two T20Is.

== T20I series ==
=== 1st T20I ===
27 September 2025
18:30 (N)
Scorecard

Nepal; 148/8 (20 overs)	v	West Indies; 129/9 (20 overs)
Rohit Paudel 38 (35); Jason Holder 4/20 (4 overs)		Navin Bidaisee 22 (25); Kushal Bhurtel 2/17 (4 overs)

Nepal won by 19 runs
Sharjah Cricket Stadium, Sharjah
Umpires: Buddhi Pradhan (Nep) and Durga Subedi (Nep)
Player of the match: Rohit Paudel (Nep)

- West Indies won the toss and elected to field.
- Akeal Hosein captained West Indies in men's T20Is for the first time.
- Ackeem Auguste, Navin Bidaisee, Amir Jangoo and Ramon Simmonds (WI) all made their T20I debuts.
- This was Nepal's first victory against a full member in men's T20Is.

=== 2nd T20I ===
29 September 2025
18:30 (N)
Scorecard

Nepal; 173/6 (20 overs)	v	West Indies; 83 (17.1 overs)
Aasif Sheikh 68* (47); Akeal Hosein 2/21 (4 overs)		Jason Holder 21 (15); Mohammad Aadil Alam 4/24 (4 overs)

Nepal won by 90 runs
Sharjah Cricket Stadium, Sharjah
Umpires: Akbar Ali (UAE) and Durga Subedi (Nep)
Player of the match: Aasif Sheikh (Nep)

- Nepal won the toss and elected to bat.
- Zishan Motara (WI) made his T20I debut.
- This was Nepal's first series victory against a full member in men's T20Is.
- West Indies' total of 83 was the lowest by a full member against an associate, and the 90-run margin of defeat was the biggest by a full member against an associate, both in T20Is.

=== 3rd T20I ===
30 September 2025
18:30 (N)
Scorecard

Nepal; 122 (19.5 overs)	v	West Indies; 123/0 (12.2 overs)
Kushal Bhurtel 39 (29); Ramon Simmonds 4/15 (3 overs)		Amir Jangoo 74* (45)

West Indies won by 10 wickets
Sharjah Cricket Stadium, Sharjah
Umpires: Vinay Kumar Jha (Nep) and Buddhi Pradhan (Nep)
Player of the match: Ramon Simmonds (WI)

- West Indies won the toss and elected to field.
- Karima Gore played in his first T20I for West Indies after having previously played 8 T20Is for United States, becoming the 21st cricketer to represent two international teams in men's T20Is.
