= List of Nepal national cricket captains =

This is a list of all cricketers who have captained the Nepal national cricket team in an official international match. This includes One Day Internationals (ODI) and Twenty20 Internationals (T20I).

== One Day International (ODI) ==
Nepal played their first ODI match on 1 August 2018.

Nepal ODI Captains
| No. | Image | Player | Span | Matches | Won | Lost | Tied | N/R | Result % |
|---|---|---|---|---|---|---|---|---|---|
| 1 | | Paras Khadka | 2018–2019 | 6 | 3 | 3 | 0 | 0 | 50.00 |
| 2 | | Gyanendra Malla | 2020-2021 | 10 | 6 | 4 | 0 | 0 | 60.00 |
| 3 | | Sandeep Lamichhane | 2022-present | 18 | 8 | 9 | 1 | 0 | 47.22 |
| 4 | | Rohit Paudel | 2022-2026 | 63 | 31 | 30 | 0 | 2 | 50.81 |
| Total | | | | 95 | 46 | 46 | 1 | 2 | 50.00 |

Last updated: 14 October 2026

== Twenty20 International (T20I) ==
Nepal played their first T20I on 16 March 2014.

Nepal T20I Captains
| No. | Image | Player | Span | Matches | Won | Lost | Tied | N/R | Result % |
|---|---|---|---|---|---|---|---|---|---|
| 1 | | Paras Khadka | 2014-2019 | 27 | 11 | 15 | 0 | 1 | 42.30 |
| 2 | | Gyanendra Malla | 2019-2021 | 12 | 9 | 3 | 0 | 0 | 75 |
| 3 | | Sandeep Lamichhane | 2022 | 18 | 13 | 5 | 0 | 0 | 72.22 |
| 4 | | Rohit Paudel | 2023-2026 | 59 | 33 | 21 | 3 | 2 | 60.52 |
| 5 | | Dipendra Singh Airee | 2026-present | 6 | 5 | 1 | 0 | 0 | 83.33 |
| Total | | | | 122 | 71 | 45 | 3 | 3 | 60.92 |

Last updated: 14 September 2026

== Captains in ICC tournaments ==
Nepal Captains in ICC Tournaments
| Tournament | Captain | Format | Matches | Won | Lost | N/R | Standing | Win % |
|---|---|---|---|---|---|---|---|---|
| 2014 World Twenty20 | Paras Khadka | T20I | 3 | 2 | 1 | 0 | Group Stage | 66.67 |
| 2024 T20 World Cup | Rohit Paudel | T20I | 4 | 0 | 3 | 1 | Group Stage | 0.00 |
| 2026 T20 World Cup | Rohit Paudel | T20I | 4 | 1 | 3 | 0 | Group Stage | 25.00 |
