= Bangladeshi cricket team in Nepal in 2026–27 =

International cricket tour

	Nepal	Bangladesh
- Dates: 26 – 30 March 2027

Twenty20 International series

The Bangladesh cricket team are scheduled to tour Nepal in March 2027 to play three Twenty20 International (T20I) matches. In September 2026, Bangladesh Cricket Board (BCB) and Cricket Association of Nepal (CAN) confirmed the fixtures for the tour. All the three matches will be played at the Tribhuvan University International Cricket Ground in Kirtipur.

The Bangladesh Cricket Board (BCB) announced that the series will be dedicated to the victims of the 2026 floods in Nepal.

== Squads ==
Nepal	Bangladesh

== T20I series ==
=== 1st T20I ===
26 March 2027
Scorecard

Nepal	v	Bangladesh

Tribhuvan University International Cricket Ground, Kirtipur

=== 2nd T20I ===
28 March 2027
Scorecard

Nepal	v	Bangladesh

Tribhuvan University International Cricket Ground, Kirtipur

=== 3rd T20I ===
30 March 2027
Scorecard

Nepal	v	Bangladesh

Tribhuvan University International Cricket Ground, Kirtipur
