= Arjun Saud =

Nepalese cricketer (born 2003)

Personal information
- Born: 29 June 2003 (age 23); Dhangadi, Nepal
- Batting: Right-handed
- Role: Wicket-keeper batsman

International information
- National side: Nepal
- ODI debut (cap 35): 14 November 2022 v UAE
- Last ODI: 4 July 2023 v Ireland
- T20I debut (cap 43): 28 August 2022 v Kenya
- Last T20I: 30 August 2022 v Kenya

Career statistics
Competition	ODI	T20I	LA
Matches	11	3	21
Runs scored	189	70	385
Batting average	17.18	22.33	20.26
100s/50s	0/1	0/0	0/2
Top score	51	35	86*
Catches/stumpings	7/3	2/2	19/7
- Source: Cricinfo, 7 August 2025

Arjun Saud (born 29 June 2003) is a Nepalese cricketer. A right-handed wicket-keeper batsman, Saud was named in Nepal's Twenty20 International (T20I) squad in August 2022, for their series against Kenya. He made his T20I debut on 28 August 2022, against Kenya.

== International career ==
In November 2022, he was named in Nepal's One Day International (ODI) squad for their series against United Arab Emirates. He made his ODI debut against United Arab Emirates in Kirtipur, on 14 November 2022.
