= Pratis GC =

Nepalese cricketer (born 2004)

Pratish GC
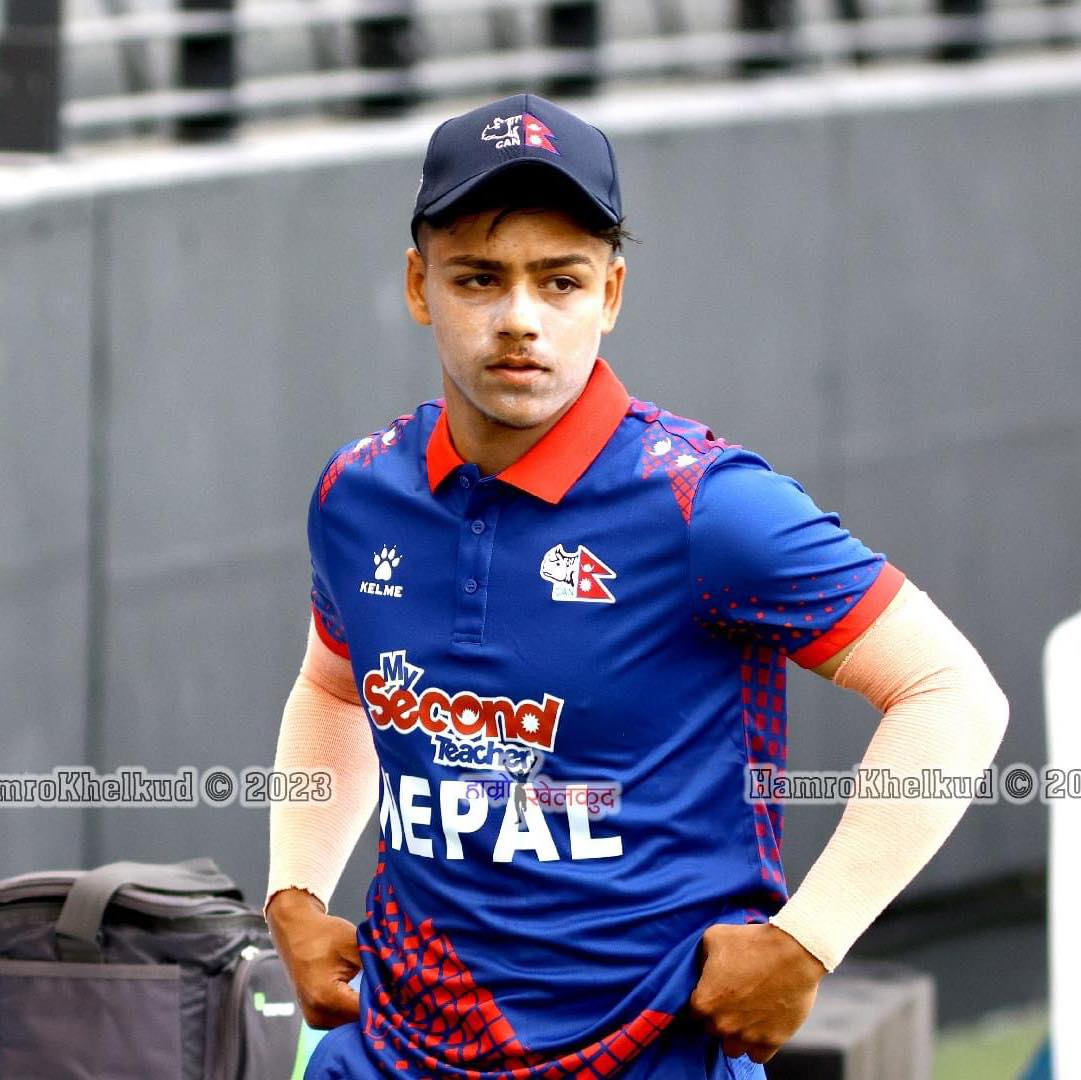

Personal information
- Full name: Pratish Gharti Chhetri
- Born: 22 May 2004 (age 22); Pyuthan, Nepal
- Batting: Right-handed
- Role: Left-arm medium

International information
- National side: Nepal
- ODI debut (cap 37): 27 February 2023 v Papua New Guinea
- Last ODI: 2 July 2023 v UAE
- ODI shirt no.: 37
- T20I debut (cap 45): 21 October 2023 v Hong Kong
- Last T20I: 28 February 2024 v Netherlands
- T20I shirt no.: 37

Domestic team information
- Years: Team
- 2022–present: Bagmati Province
- 2024–present: Biratnagar Kings

Career statistics
Competition	ODI	T20I
Matches	3	1
Runs scored	11	–
Batting average	–	–
100s/50s	0/0	–
Top score	11*	–
Catches/stumpings	1/–	1/–
- Source: Cricinfo, 2 November 2023

Pratish Gharti Chhetri (born 22 May 2004) is a Nepalese cricketer. He bowls left-arm medium and is a right-handed batsman. He has represented Bagmati Province and Tribhuvan Army Club in the domestic matches. He has represented Nepal in the Under-16 format as well.

== International cricket ==
In August 2022, he was named as one of the reserves in Nepal's bilateral T20I series in Kenya. He represented Pokhara Avengers in the inaugural Nepal T20 League. In February 2023, Pratish was selected for a tri-series in UAE, which was a part of 2019–2023 ICC Cricket World Cup League 2. In the same series, he made his One Day International (ODI) debut for Nepal against the Papua New Guinea on 27 February 2023.

In October 2023, Pratish was selected to play in the Regional Final of 2023 ICC T20 World Cup Asia Qualifier. In May 2024, he was named in Nepal's squad for the 2024 ICC Men's T20 World Cup tournament.
