= Basir Ahamad =

Nepali cricketer (born 2003)

Personal information
- Born: 11 September 2003 (age 23); Kapilvastu, Nepal
- Batting: Left-handed
- Bowling: Slow left-arm orthodox

International information
- National side: Nepal
- ODI debut (cap 33): 11 July 2022 v Namibia
- Last ODI: 29 April 2026 v Oman
- T20I debut (cap 42): 26 August 2022 v Kenya
- Last T20I: 20 April 2026 v UAE

Domestic team information
- Years: Team
- 2022—present: Tribhuvan Army Club
- 2024—present: Biratnagar Kings
- Source: Cricinfo, 30 April 2026

Basir Ahamad (born 11 September 2003) is a Nepali international cricketer who bowls slow left-arm orthodox and bats left-handed. He represents the Nepal national cricket team in One Day Internationals (ODIs) and Twenty20 Internationals (T20Is).

== Early life and domestic career ==
Ahamad was born in Kapilvastu, Nepal. He made his Twenty20 debut on 1 May 2022, for Nepal against Zimbabwe A and made his List A debut on 9 May 2022, for Nepal, also against Zimbabwe A.

== International career ==
In June 2022, Ahamad was named in Nepal's One Day International (ODI) squad for round 14 of the 2019–2023 ICC Cricket World Cup League 2 in Scotland. He made his ODI debut on 11 July 2022, against Namibia. In August 2022, he was named in Nepal's Twenty20 International (T20I) squad for their series against Kenya and made his T20I debut on 26 August 2022, against Kenya. Basir manage to score 181 runs and picked up 6 wickets in first edition of 2024 Nepal Premier League

In January 2026, Ahamad was selected in Nepal's squad for 2026 T20I World Cup.
