= Lokesh Bam =

Nepalese cricketer (born 2000)

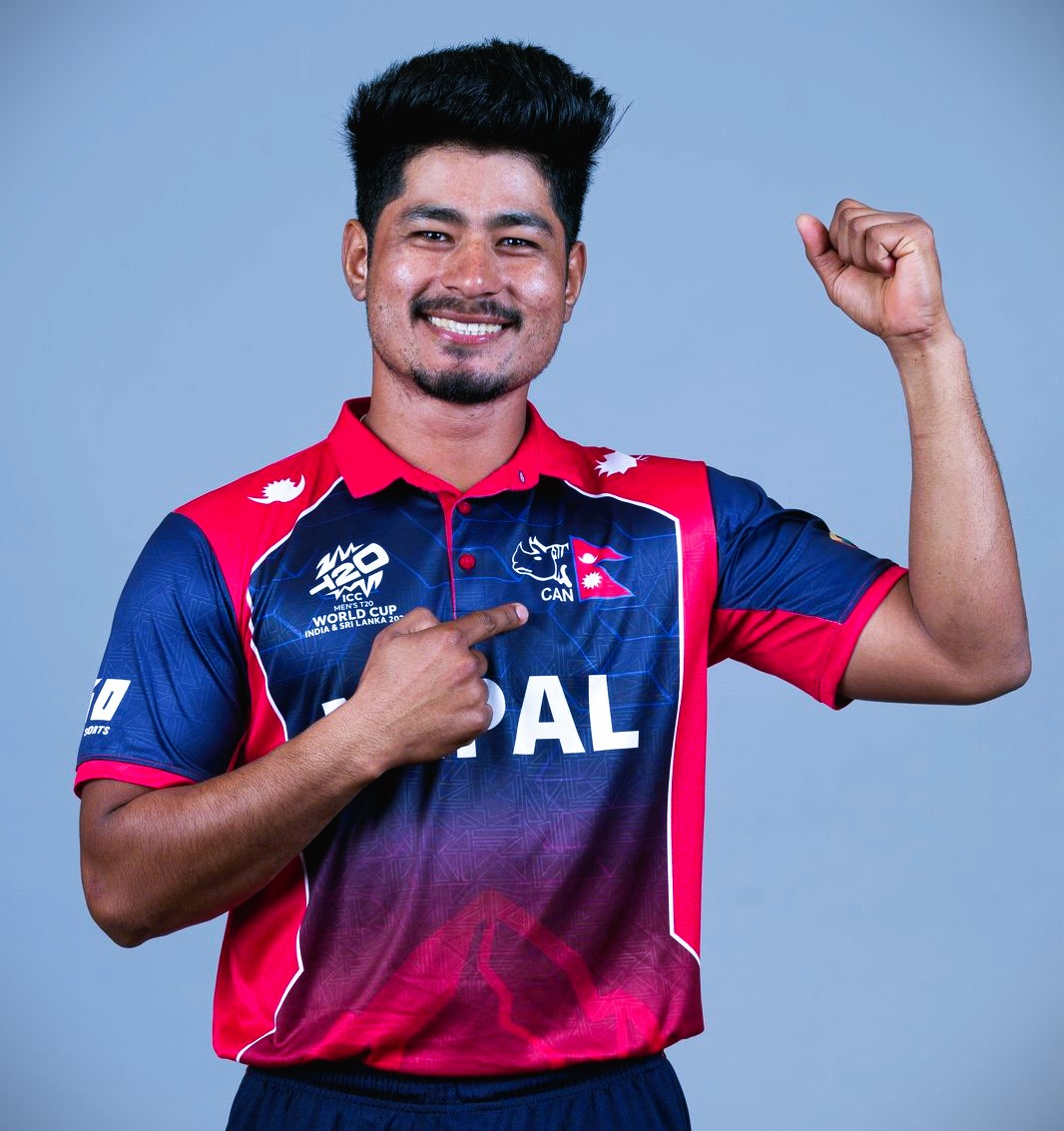
- Bam in 2026

Personal information
- Full name: Lokesh Bam
- Born: 13 August 2000 (age 26); Doti, Nepal
- Batting: Right-handed
- Role: Wicket-keeper Batsman

International information
- National side: Nepal (2022–present)
- Only ODI (cap 46): 22 November 2026 v United Arab Emirates
- T20I debut (cap 38): 12 February 2022 v United Arab Emirates
- Last T20I: 21 April 2026 v United Arab Emirates

Domestic team information
- Years: Team
- 2024–present: Biratnagar Kings

Career statistics
Competition	T20I	Twenty20
Matches	23	28
Runs scored	215	399
Batting average	15.35	21.00
100s/50s	0/0	1/0
Top score	39*	106
Catches/stumpings	10/-	13/-
- Source: Cricinfo, 22 November 2026

Lokesh Bam (Nepali: लोकेश बम, Nepali pronunciation: [loːkeʃ bʌm]; born 13 August 2000) is a Nepalese cricketer who plays as a right-handed wicket-keeper batsman. He made his Twenty20 International (T20I) debut for Nepal against the United Arab Emirates on 12 February 2022. He has represented the Sudurpashchim Province cricket team and the Armed Police Force Club in domestic competitions. In September 2025, Bam was named in Nepal's squad for a series against the West Indies, and later selected for Nepal's squad for the ICC Men's T20 World Cup 2026. whereas, In the opening match against England at wankhede stadium, bam scored not out 39 runs from just 20 balls. unfortunately Nepal lose this game by 4 runs.

== Early and personal life ==
Lokesh Bam was born and raised in Dhangadhi, Nepal. He grew up in a large joint family consisting of his father, two mothers, two sisters, and a brother. His father was involved in politics, though Lokesh did not share an interest in the field. Bam's cricket journey began in his neighborhood when he was inspired by his neighbor, Janak Singh. He initially practiced with a rubber ball in a local field before joining the Dhangadhi Cricket Academy after his Secondary Education Examination (SEE), where he trained under coach Arjun Khadka.

His father originally wanted him to become an engineer, but Bam's passion for cricket led him to prioritize sports over academics. To advance his career, he moved to Kathmandu to join the Nepal Cricket School (NCS) and later trained at the TU Ground. He completed his plus-two education at SPA College in Dhangadhi under a scholarship and later pursued a bachelor's degree. Aside from cricket, Bam is interested in traveling and is a collector of shoes.

== Franchise cricket ==
Bam has been a key player for the Biratnagar Kings in the Nepal Premier League. In the 2024 season, he scored a match-winning half-century that propelled the Kings to victory early in the tournament. and he was retained by Biratnagar Kings for 2025 Nepal Premier League. In the 2025, Bam was one of the leading performers as Biratnagar posted a record total of 220/6 against the Pokhara Avengers, with Bam top-scoring with 72 off 48 balls in a dominant batting display that helped his side register a 53‑run win — the highest team total in NPL history.

== International career ==
In February 2022, Bam was named in Nepal's squad for the Oman Quadrangular T20I Series and the subsequent 2022 ICC Men's T20 World Cup Global Qualifier A. He made his Twenty20 International (T20I) debut for Nepal on 12 February 2022 against the United Arab Emirates. In his debut innings, he made an immediate impact by scoring 33 runs off 21 balls, featuring two fours and two sixes.

Bam's reputation as a high-strike-rate finisher grew during his performances for the Nepal 'A' developmental side. On 29 March 2024, during the first T20 match against Ireland Wolves at the Tribhuvan University International Cricket Ground, Bam struck a brilliant century, scoring 106 runs from 56 deliveries. His aggressive knock included nine fours and eight sixes, reaching the milestone in 52 balls.

In May 2025, Bam was named as one of the additional players to join Nepal's "Best 15" squad following their United Kingdom tour to participate in the 2025 Scotland T20I Tri-Nation Series. In September 2025, he was named in the squad for the Unity Cup against the West Indies. He featured in the third T20I in Sharjah, contributing to Nepal's landmark 2–1 series win. Later that year, during the 2025 Men's T20 World Cup Asia–EAP Regional Final in October, he recorded a then career-best T20I score of 39* runs off just 12 balls against Samoa.

On 6 January 2026, Nepal head coach Stuart Law included Bam in the final 15-member squad for the 2026 ICC Men's T20 World Cup. In Nepal's opening match of the 2026 ICC Men's T20 World Cup on 8 February 2026, held against England at the Wankhede Stadium, Bam played a career-defining innings. Chasing 185, he smashed an unbeaten 39* off 20 balls.
