= Mohammad Aadil Alam =

Nepali cricketer (born 2003)

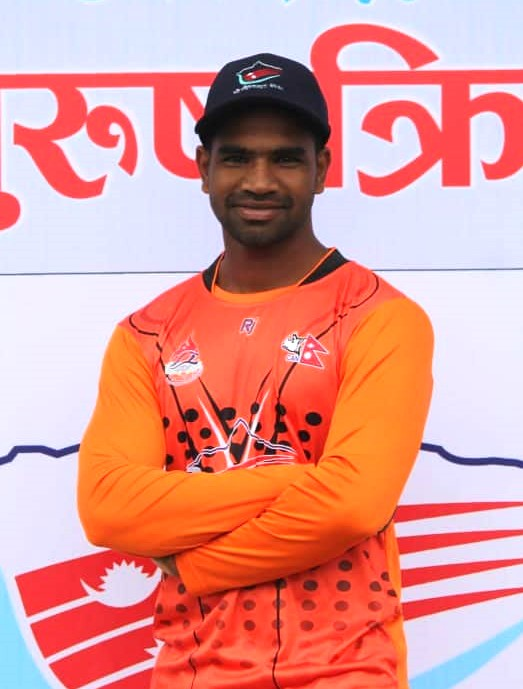

Personal information
- Full name: Mohammad Aadil Alam
- Born: 18 October 2003 (age 23); Simraungadh, Nepal
- Batting: Right-handed
- Bowling: Right-arm medium
- Role: All Rounder, Middle Order Batsman - 5

International information
- National side: Nepal
- ODI debut (cap 32): 11 June 2022 v USA
- Last ODI: 16 July 2022 v Namibia
- T20I debut (cap 41): 31 March 2022 v PNG
- Last T20I: 30 August 2022 v Kenya
- Source: Cricinfo, 30 August 2022

Mohammad Aadil Alam, also known as Aadil Ansari (born 18 October 2003), is a Nepalese cricketer. Alam has been representing Madhesh Province Cricket Team in domestic cricket. In March 2022, he was named in Nepal's Twenty20 International (T20I) squad for the 2021–22 Nepal T20I Tri-Nation Series. He made his T20I debut on 31 March 2022, against Papua New Guinea. He made his List A debut on 6 May 2022, for Nepal against Zimbabwe A. Later the same month, he was named in Nepal's One Day International (ODI) squad for round 13 of the 2019–2023 ICC Cricket World Cup League 2 in the United States, He made his ODI debut on 11 June 2022, against the United States, where he took three wickets.

== Early life and background ==
Mohammad Aadil Alam was born on 18 October 2003 in Simraungadh, Bara District, Nepal. He developed an interest in cricket at a young age and began playing in local tournaments in Madhesh Province. His early performances in school-level and district competitions earned him recognition from provincial coaches and selectors.

== Domestic career ==
Alam began his professional domestic career with Madhesh Province in Nepal's structured provincial competitions. His standout performance came during the Prime Minister Cup, where he played a key role in Madhesh's upset victory against a stronger side. His consistent form in domestic formats eventually led to attention from national selectors.

== International career ==
In March 2022, Alam was selected for the Nepal national team's squad in the 2021–22 Nepal T20I Tri-Nation Series, making his debut against Papua New Guinea on 31 March 2022. He later made his ODI debut on 11 June 2022 against the United States during the ICC Cricket World Cup League 2, taking 3 wickets in a promising start.

== Playing style ==
Aadil Alam is known for his disciplined right-arm medium pace bowling with a focus on accuracy and economy. With the bat, he typically plays in the lower-middle order, capable of producing quick runs in the death overs. He is also regarded as a sharp fielder with good reflexes and speed.

== Controversy and Ban Lift ==
On 23 January 2023, Mohammad Aadil Alam was arrested by Nepal Police on allegations of spot-fixing during the Nepal T20 League. He was among several players investigated for suspected corruption, including intentionally bowling no-balls.

In March 2024, the Kathmandu District Court acquitted Alam due to lack of sufficient evidence. The ruling effectively cleared him of the charges.

Following the verdict, the Cricket Association of Nepal (CAN) reviewed the case through its Integrity Committee. On 5 May 2025, CAN officially lifted Alam's suspension, allowing him to return to domestic and international cricket. The decision was reported by several major Nepali news outlets.
