= Abinash Bohara =

Nepalese cricketer

Personal information
- Born: 30 July 1997 (age 29); Salyan, Nepal
- Batting: Right-handed
- Bowling: Right-arm medium
- Role: Bowler

International information
- National side: Nepal
- ODI debut (cap 21): 5 February 2020 v Oman
- Last ODI: 8 February 2020 v USA
- ODI shirt no.: 13
- T20I debut (cap 23): 31 January 2019 v UAE
- Last T20I: 14 June 2024 v South Africa
- T20I shirt no.: 13

Domestic team information
- Years: Team
- 2017–: Armed Police Force Club
- 2024–: Sudurpaschim Royals

Career statistics
Competition	T20I
Matches	15
Runs scored	5
Batting average	1.66
100s/50s	0/0
Top score	3*
Balls bowled	288
Wickets	16
Bowling average	20.18
5 wickets in innings	1
10 wickets in match	0
Best bowling	4/35
Catches/stumpings	3/-
Medal record
Representing Nepal
Men's Cricket
South Asian Games
Bronze medal – third place	2019 Kathmandu/Pokhara	Team
- Source: Cricinfo, 31 October 2023

Abinash Bohara (born 30 July 1997) is a Nepalese cricketer. He is a right-handed batsman who bowls right arm medium fast.

== Early life and career ==
Bohara was born in Salyan district of Nepal. As a child, he always wanted to join the army. However, after failing to succeed in the army trials, he commenced his cricket journey representing the Nepalgunj (then region no. 5) U-19 cricket team. He claimed seven wickets (three against Baitadi and four against Birgunj) in two matches for Nepalgunj in the 2014 National U-19 Cricket Tournament and that believes gave him more confidence to choose cricket as a career pathway.

== International career ==
After good performances in the domestic leagues, Bohara was named in Nepal's Twenty20 International (T20I) squad for their series against the United Arab Emirates in January 2019. He made his T20I debut against the United Arab Emirates on 31 January 2019. He was named the player of the series, after taking six wickets in the three matches. In June 2019, he was named in Nepal's squad for the Regional Finals of the 2018–19 ICC T20 World Cup Asia Qualifier tournament.

In November 2019, Bohara was named in Nepal's squad for the 2019 ACC Emerging Teams Asia Cup in Bangladesh. He made his List A debut for Nepal, against Hong Kong, in the Emerging Teams Cup on 16 November 2019. Later the same month, he was also named in Nepal's squad for the men's cricket tournament at the 2019 South Asian Games. The Nepal team won the bronze medal, beating the Maldives by five wickets in the third-place playoff match.

In January 2020, Bohara was named in Nepal's One Day International (ODI) squad for the 2020 Nepal Tri-Nation Series. He made his ODI debut against Oman, on 5 February 2020. In September 2020, he was among the eighteen cricketers awarded a central contract by the Cricket Association of Nepal.

In May 2024, he was named in Nepal's squad for the 2024 ICC Men's T20 World Cup tournament.
