= Tribhuvan University International Cricket Ground =

Cricket stadium in Kathmandu, Nepal

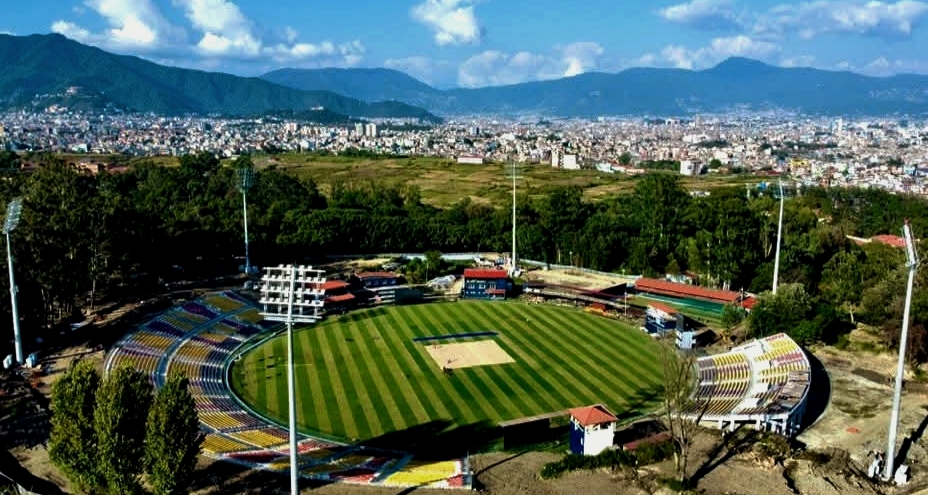
- TU Stadium in 2025
- Interactive map of Tribhuvan University International Cricket Ground
- Address: Kathmandu, Bagmati Province, Nepal
- Location: Kathmandu, Nepal
- Coordinates: 27°40′41″N 85°17′26″E
- Elevation: 1,400 m (4,600 ft)
- Owner: Government of Nepal
- Operator: Cricket Association of Nepal
- Seating type: Stadium seating
- Capacity: 13,000 (2025–present); 30,000 (planned)
- Surface: Grass
- Scoreboard: Yes
- Field size: 154 metres (168 yd) × 132 metres (144 yd)
- Field shape: Oval

Construction
- Opened: 1998; 28 years ago
- Architect: Vivek Shrestha

Ground information
- Country: Nepal
- Coordinates: 27°40′41″N 85°17′26″E
- Tenants: Nepal national cricket team Nepal women's national cricket team Kathmandu Gorkhas
- End names
- Pavilion End; Chobhar End

International information
- First men's ODI: 5 February 2020: Nepal v Oman
- Last men's ODI: 22 May 2026: Nepal v United States
- First men's T20I: 5 December 2019: Nepal v Bhutan
- Last men's T20I: 21 April 2026: Nepal v United Arab Emirates
- First women's T20I: 16 May 2022: Nepal v Uganda
- Last women's T20I: 31 January 2025: Netherlands v Thailand
- As of 22 May 2026; Source: Cricinfo

The Tribhuvan University International Cricket Ground, also known as TU International Cricket Ground or TU Cricket Ground, is an international cricket ground in Kirtipur, Kathmandu, Nepal, within the premises of Tribhuvan University.

== History ==
The first recorded match held on the ground was Bangladesh versus Singapore in the 1998 ACC Trophy.

Nepal took part in the inaugural Intercontinental Cup, whose matches had first-class status. The ground held its first first-class match when Nepal hosted Malaysia. Another two first-class matches were held there during the 2005 Intercontinental Cup when Nepal hosted Hong Kong and the United Arab Emirates.

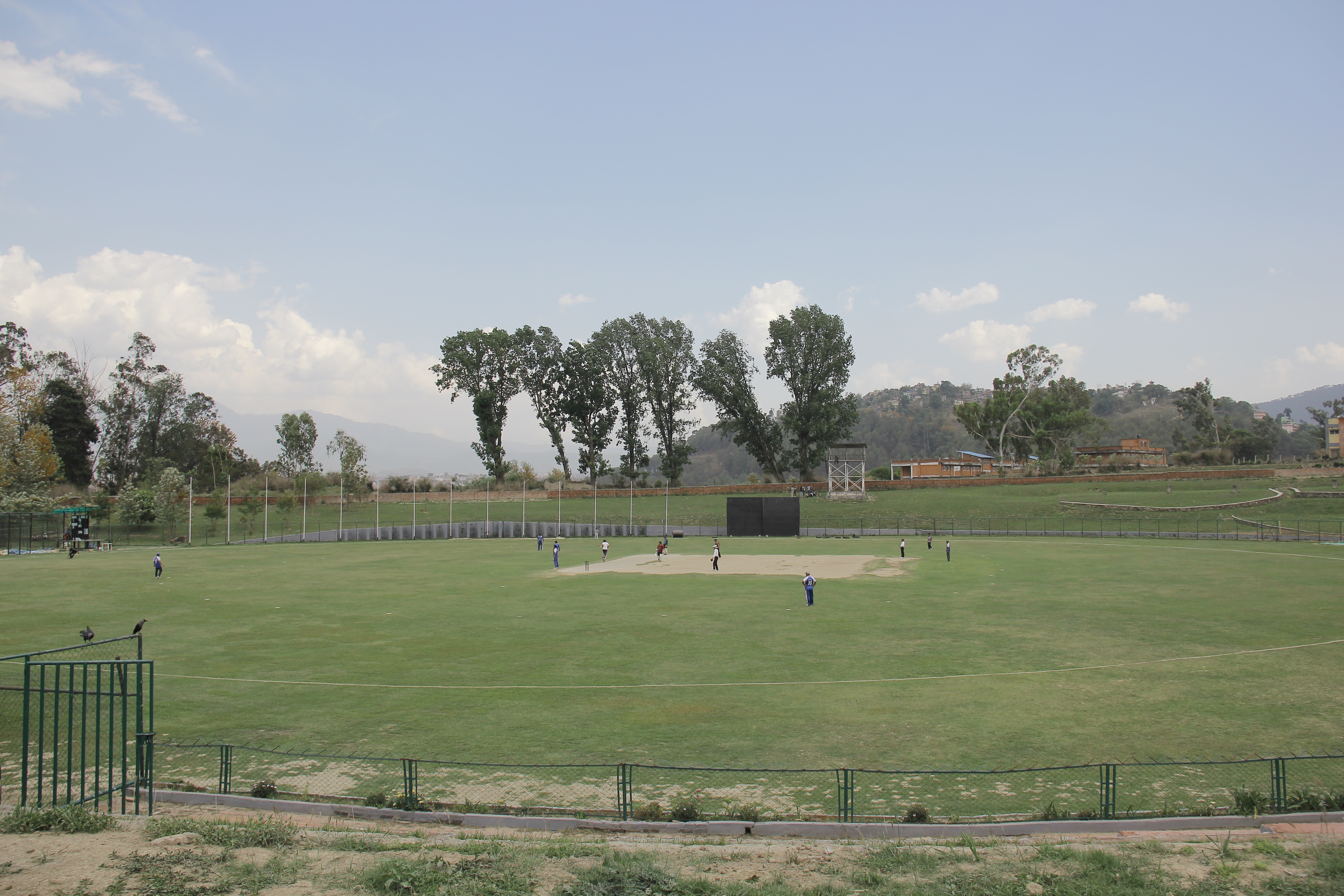
Initial stage of TU ground.

These were the first first-class matches to be held anywhere in Nepal. The ground has since hosted a number of international competitions, including the 2010 ICC World Cricket League Division Five and 2015-17 ICC World Cricket League Championship.

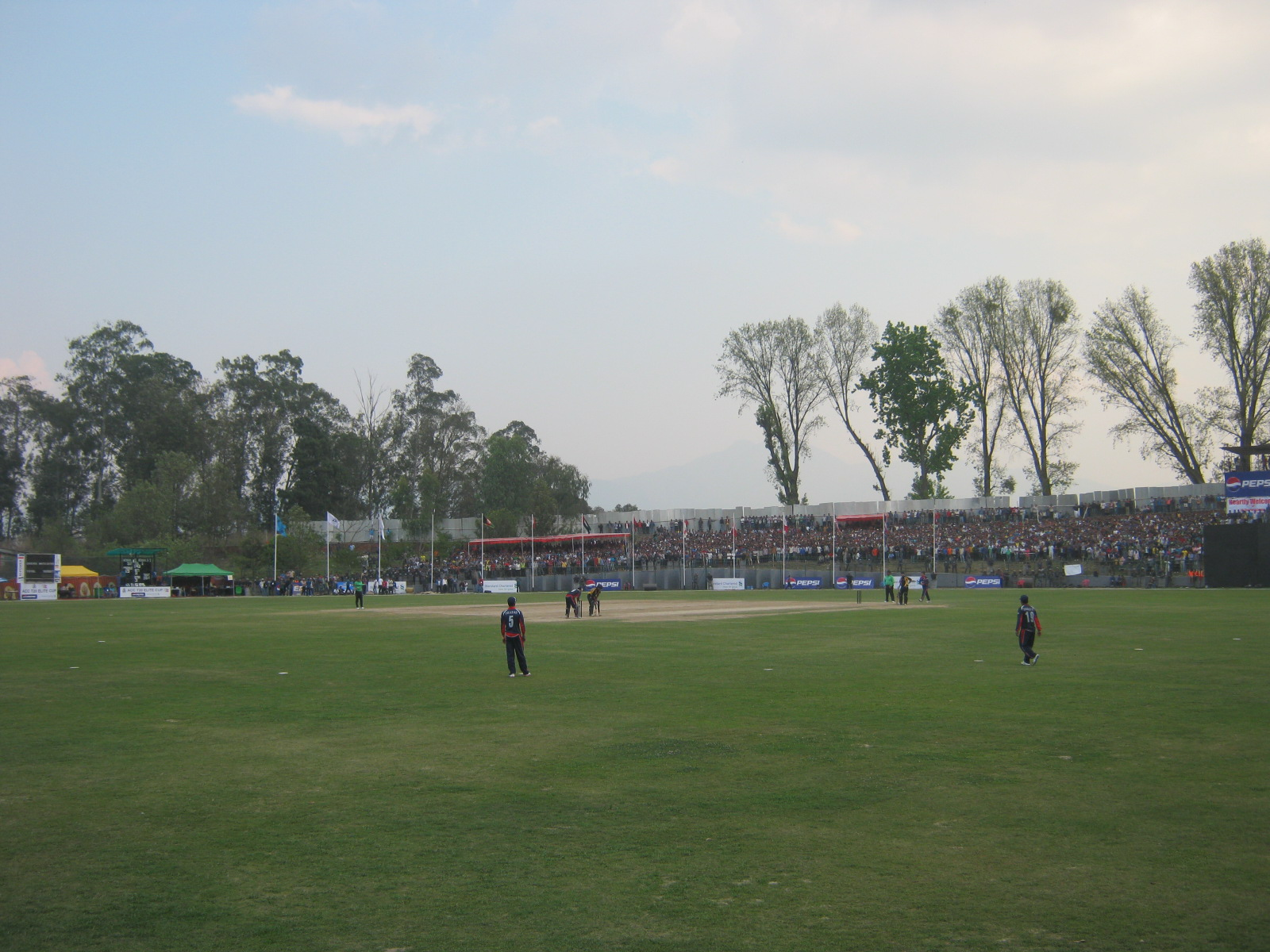
TU International Cricket Ground in 2013.

Crowd trouble flared during the competition when many spectators disturbed play out of frustration with the performance of the Nepal team in a match against the United States national cricket team. The match was later investigated by the International Cricket Council for the crowd trouble and the resulting calculations of the net-run rate that had denied Singapore promotion to 2010 ICC World Cricket League Division Four.

The ground has also hosted domestic tournaments, including the Everest Premier League and Prime Minister One Day Cup. Many went to watch the matches and enjoy domestic cricket.

== Renovations ==
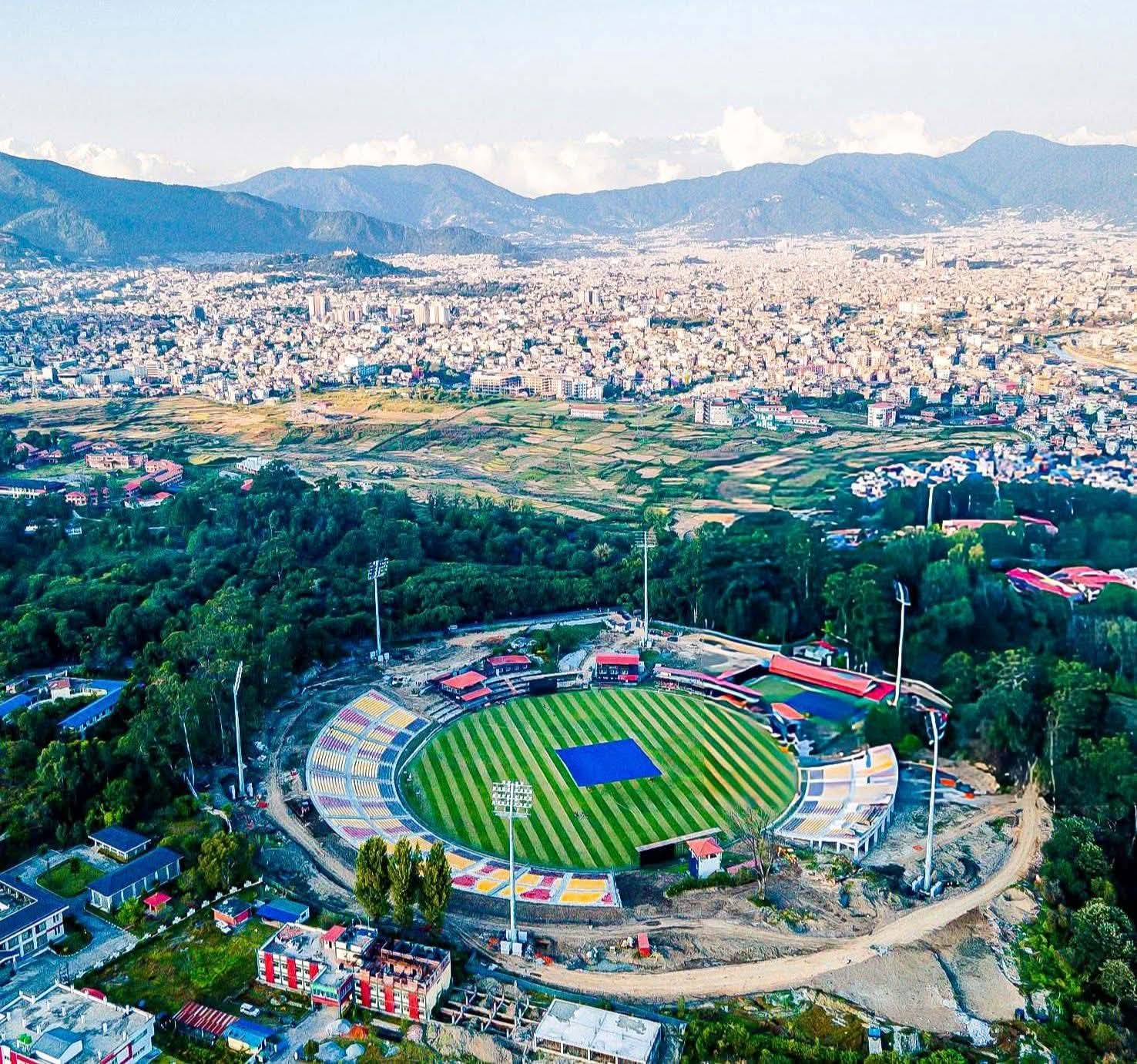
Aerial view of the stadium in 2025 with Kathmandu Valley in backdrop

After the devastating April 2015 Nepal earthquake, basic infrastructures of the ground were destroyed. Cricket Association of Nepal rebuilt initial basic infrastructures.

In November 2025, first phase of upgrade was completed, adding seating capacity of 10,000 and six flood lights; construction had begun March 2025. Work was initiated by then Prime minister of Nepal K. P. Sharma Oli, who ordered the work to be completed within three months. Due to unforeseen circumstances—the climate and production delays—the first phase was pushed further and was completed later in the year. Minister Kul Man Ghising officially inaugurated the floodlights and the stadium 16 November 2025.

The construction is scheduled to continue in 2026—with second and third phases for a complete final capacity of 30,000—and expected to be complete by November 2026.

== Major sports events ==
- 1998 ACC Trophy
- 2005 Intercontinental Cup
- 2010 ICC World Cricket League Division Five
- 2011 ACC Twenty20 Cup
- 2013 ACC Twenty20 Cup
- 2015–17 ICC World Cricket League Championship
- 2016 Everest Premier League
- 2017 Everest Premier League
- 2018 Everest Premier League
- Cricket at the 2019 South Asian Games – Men's tournament
- 2019-22 ICC Cricket World Cup League 2
- 2021–22 Nepal T20I Tri-Nation Series
- 2023 Men's Premier Cup
- 2023 ICC Men's T20 World Cup Asia Regional Final
- Nepal Premier League

== Records and stats ==
=== Matches hosted ===
Format	ODI	T20I	WT20I
Matches	68	68	58
As of 24 March 2026 (Source)

=== ODI records ===
- Highest ODI total: 310/6 – United Arab Emirates vs. Nepal, 2023 Nepal Tri-Nation Series (round 21), 16 March 2023 and 310/8 – Nepal vs. Oman, 2023 ACC Men's Premier Cup, 21 April 2023
- Highest Individual ODI Score: 133 – Michael van Lingen, Namibia vs. Nepal, 2023 Nepal Tri-Nation Series (round 19), 14 February 2023
- Best ODI Bowling Figure: 6/16 – Sandeep Lamichhane, Nepal vs United States, 2020 Nepal Tri-Nation Series, 12 February 2020
- Highest ODI Partnership: 216 (for the 3rd wicket) – Aqib Ilyas & Zeeshan Maqsood, Oman vs. United States, 2020 Nepal Tri-Nation Series, 11 February 2020

ODI Matches Record
Team	MP	W	L	T	NR
Nepal	26	18	8	0	0
Namibia	8	3	5	0	0
United Arab Emirates	8	2	6	0	0
Papua New Guinea	6	3	3	0	0
Oman	5	4	1	0	0
Netherlands	4	2	2	0	0
Scotland	4	2	2	0	0
United States	4	0	4	0	0
Canada	3	0	3	0	0
Reference: ESPNcricinfo (As of 25 February 2024)

=== T20I records ===
- Highest T20I total: 247/5 – Netherlands vs. Namibia, 2024 Nepal Tri-Nation Series, 29 February 2024
- Highest Individual T20I Score: 135 – Michael Levitt, Netherlands vs. Namibia, 2024 Nepal Tri-Nation Series, 29 February 2024
- Best T20I Bowling Figure: 5/21 – Karan KC, Nepal vs. PNG, 2021-22 Nepal T20I Tri-Nation Series, 28 March 2022
- Highest T20I Partnership: 193 (for the 2nd wicket) – Michael Levitt & Sybrand Engelbrecht, Netherlands vs. Namibia, 2024 Nepal Tri-Nation Series, 29 February 2024

T20I Matches Record
Team	MP	W	L	T	NR
Nepal	23	16	6	1	0
Malaysia	11	2	8	1	0
Netherlands	10	5	3	1	1
Oman	5	4	0	1	0
Papua New Guinea	5	1	4	0	0
Namibia	4	1	2	0	1
Maldives	3	1	2	0	0
Singapore	3	0	3	0	0
Bhutan	2	0	2	0	0
Bahrain	1	0	1	0	0
United Arab Emirates	1	1	0	0	0
Reference: ESPNcricinfo (As of 5 March 2024)

=== WT20I records ===
- Highest T20I total: –
- Highest individual T20I score:
- Best T20I Bowling Figure:
- Highest T20I partnership:
- Most wickets in WT20I:

WT20I Matches Record
Team	MP	W	L	T	NR
Nepal	15	3	12	0	0
Netherlands	10	8	2	0	0
Thailand	9	6	3	0	0
Scotland	6	4	2	0	0
Uganda	5	3	2	0	0
Bangladesh	3	3	0	0	0
Ireland	3	2	1	0	0
Namibia	2	0	2	0	0
United States	2	0	2	0	0
Zimbabwe	2	0	2	0	0
Papua New Guinea	1	0	1	0	0
Reference: ESPNcricinfo (As of 14 February 2026)

== List of International centuries ==
=== ODI centuries ===
Fifteen ODI centuries have been scored at the venue.

No.	Score	Player	Team	Balls	Opposing team	Date	Result
1	109*	Aqib Ilyas	Oman	108	Nepal	9 February 2020	Won
2	109	Zeeshan Maqsood	Oman	109	United States	11 February 2020	Won
3	105	Aqib Ilyas	Oman	123	United States	11 February 2020	Won
4	126	Rohit Paudel	Nepal	107	Papua New Guinea	25 March 2022	Lost
5	105	Dipendra Singh Airee	Nepal	140	Papua New Guinea	26 March 2022	Lost
6	133	Michael van Lingen	Namibia	137	Nepal	14 February 2023	Lost
7	115	Kushal Bhurtel	Nepal	113	Namibia	14 February 2023	Won
8	103*	George Munsey	Scotland	61	Namibia	15 February 2023	Won
9	107*	Michael Leask	Scotland	85	Nepal	17 February 2023	Lost
10	110	Aasif Sheikh	Nepal	110	Papua New Guinea	9 March 2023	Won
11	119	Muhammad Waseem	United Arab Emirates	76	Papua New Guinea	15 March 2023	Won
12	101*	Asif Khan	United Arab Emirates	42	Nepal	16 March 2023	Lost
13	108	Kushal Malla	Nepal	64	Oman	21 April 2023	Won
14	112*	Anil Sah	Nepal	124	Canada	12 February 2024	Won
15	101*	Bhim Sharki	Nepal	129	Canada	12 February 2024	Won

=== T20I centuries ===
Five T20I centuries have been scored at the venue.

No.	Score	Player	Team	Balls	Opposing team	Date	Result
1	107	Gyanendra Malla	Nepal	55	Bhutan	5 December 2019	Won
2	133*	Max O'Dowd	Netherlands	73	Malaysia	18 April 2021	Won
3	110*	Dipendra Singh Airee	Nepal	57	Malaysia	2 April 2022	Won
4	101	Jan Nicol Loftie-Eaton	Namibia	36	Nepal	27 February 2024	Won
5	135	Michael Levitt	Netherlands	62	Namibia	29 February 2024	Won

== List of International five-wicket hauls ==
=== One-day Internationals ===
The following table summarizes the five-wicket hauls taken in ODIs at this venue.

No.	Figures	Player	Country	Innings	Opponent	Date	Result
1	6/16	Sandeep Lamichhane	Nepal	1	United States	12 February 2020	Won
2	5/61	Karan KC	Nepal	1	Namibia	14 February 2023	Won
3	5/30	Ruben Trumpelmann	Namibia	1	Scotland	20 February 2023	Lost
4	5/38	Semo Kamea	Papua New Guinea	1	Nepal	9 March 2023	Lost
5	5/20	Lalit Rajbanshi	Nepal	2	United Arab Emirates	12 March 2023	Won
6	5/25	Sandeep Lamichhane	Nepal	1	Papua New Guinea	13 March 2023	Won
7	5/28	Gerhard Erasmus	Namibia	1	Nepal	15 February 2024	Won
8	6/34	Aryan Dutt	Netherlands	1	Namibia	19 February 2024	Won

=== Twenty20 Internationals ===
The following table summarizes the five-wicket hauls taken in T20Is at this venue.

#	Figures	Player	Country	Innings	Opponent	Date	Result
1	5/21	Karan KC	Nepal	2	Papua New Guinea	31 March 2022	Won
2	5/16	Muhammad Amir	Malaysia	2	Singapore	2 November 2023	Won

== See also ==
- List of cricket grounds in Nepal
