= Dipendra Singh Airee =

Nepalese cricketer (born 2000)

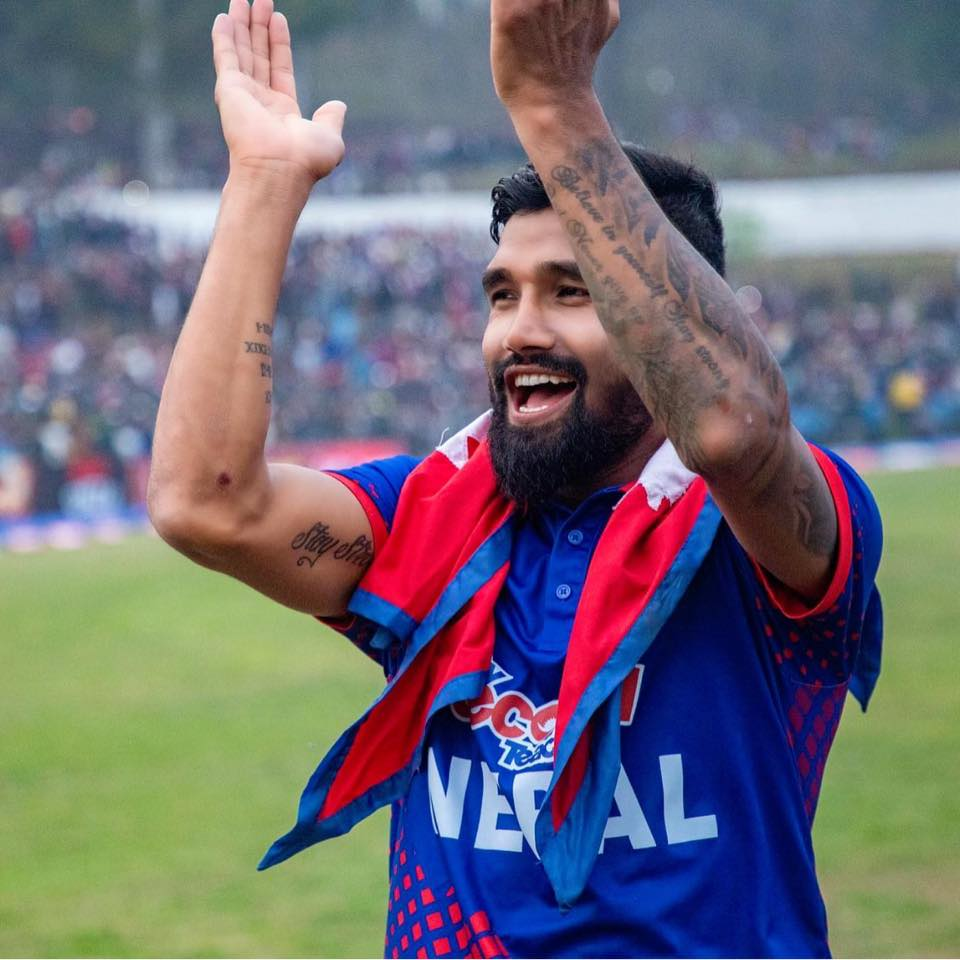

Personal information
- Born: 24 January 2000 (age 26); Tilachaur, Mahendranagar, Kanchanpur
- Nickname: The Tiger
- Height: 5 ft 5 in (1.65 m)
- Batting: Right-handed
- Bowling: Right-arm off break
- Role: All-rounder

International information
- National side: Nepal (2018–present)
- ODI debut (cap 2): 1 August 2018 v Netherlands
- Last ODI: 12 September 2026 v UAE
- ODI shirt no.: 45
- T20I debut (cap 19): 29 July 2018 v Netherlands
- Last T20I: 25 September 2026 v Afghanistan
- T20I shirt no.: 45

Domestic team information
- Years: Team
- 2016: Panchakanya Tej
- 2017–2018: Chitwan Tigers
- 2017–2025: Nepal Police Club
- 2022: Lumbini All Stars
- 2023: Montreal Tigers
- 2023: Gulf Giants
- 2024: Vancouver Knights
- 2024–present: Sudurpaschim Royals
- 2026–present: Islamabad United
- 2026–present: JB Bruges
- 2026–present: Jaffna Kings

Career statistics
Competition	ODI	T20I	LA	T20
Matches	82	101	105	110
Runs scored	1,754	2,235	2,235	2,341
Batting average	25.05	33.86	25.11	32.51
100s/50s	2/10	1/12	2/13	1/12
Top score	105	110*	105	110*
Balls bowled	2,785	1,316	3,090	1,406
Wickets	60	62	68	64
Bowling average	31.38	21.19	30.51	22.89
5 wickets in innings	0	0	0	0
10 wickets in match	0	0	0	0
Best bowling	4/24	4/18	4/14	4/18
Catches/stumpings	41/–	44/–	47/–	52/–
Medal record
Representing Nepal
Men's Cricket
South Asian Games
Bronze medal – third place	2019 Kathmandu/Pokhara	Team
- Source: ESPNcricinfo, 25 September 2026

Dipendra Singh Airee (Nepali: दिपेन्द्र सिंह ऐरी; Nepali: [d̪i.pen.d̪ɾʌ‿siŋ‿ʌi̯ɾi]) born 24 January 2000 is a Nepalese cricketer. He represents the Nepal National Cricket team and captains the Twenty20 International team. In August 2018, he was one of the eleven cricketers to play in Nepal's first-ever One Day International (ODI) match, against the Netherlands. During the 19th Asian Games in Hangzhou, China, Airee scored the fastest fifty in T20Is, off just 9 balls, against Mongolia.

In April 2024, he became the first player from Nepal and third player overall in T20Is to hit six consecutive sixes in an over, doing it against Qatar in the ACC Men's Premier Cup. Considered as one of Nepal's finest All-rounders, he is currently the fourth best T20I all-rounder in the world according to the ICC Men's Player Rankings.

== Career ==
From Village ground Gajjar and Tilachaur, Airee made his List A debut for Nepal against Kenya in the 2015–17 ICC World Cricket League Championship on 11 March 2017. Prior to his List A debut, he was named in Nepal's squad for the 2016 Under-19 Cricket World Cup. In 2017 ACC Under-19 Asia Cup, he was captain of the Nepal national under-19 team. He scored 88 runs and took 4/39 against India in the group A match and was adjudged man of the match. He scored 88 runs to push the total score to 185/8. India were 91/1 after which he led the attack, forcing a collapse to 166 all out. India U-19 team were the defending champions and Nepal's victory was considered an upset by cricket critics.

== International career ==
Airee was a member of Nepal's squad for the 2018 ICC World Cricket League Division Two tournament.

In July 2018, Airee was named in Nepal's squad for their One Day International (ODI) series against the Netherlands. These were Nepal's first ODI matches since gaining ODI status during the 2018 Cricket World Cup Qualifier.

He made his Twenty20 International (T20I) on 29 July 2018 in the 2018 MCC Tri-Nation Series, against the Netherlands. He made his ODI debut for Nepal against the Netherlands on 1 August 2018.

In August 2018, Airee was named in Nepal's squad for the 2018 Asia Cup Qualifier tournament. In October 2018, he was named in Nepal's squad in the Eastern sub-region group for the 2018–19 ICC World Twenty20 Asia Qualifier tournament. In June 2019, he was named in Nepal's squad for the Regional Finals of the 2018–19 ICC T20 World Cup Asia Qualifier tournament.

He made his first-class debut on 6 November 2019, for Nepal against the Marylebone Cricket Club (MCC), during the MCC's tour of Nepal. Later the same month, he was named as the vice-captain of Nepal's squad for the 2019 ACC Emerging Teams Asia Cup in Bangladesh. He was also named in Nepal's squad for the cricket tournament at the 2019 South Asian Games. Nepal won the bronze medal, after beating the Maldives by five wickets in the third-place playoff match. In September 2020, he was one of eighteen cricketers to be awarded with a central contract by the Cricket Association of Nepal.

In December 2021, Airee and Gyanendra Malla were sacked as vice-captain and captain, respectively, over disciplinary issues, with the Cricket Association of Nepal (CAN) appointing Sandeep Lamichhane as the new national captain.

On 26 March 2022, in the second match of a two-match series against Papua New Guinea, Airee scored his first century in an ODI match with 105 runs.

On 2 April 2022, in the final round-robin match of the tri-series, Airee scored his first century in T20I cricket, with 110 not out against Malaysia.

On September 27, 2023, Airee broke a 16-year-old world record by Yuvraj Singh for the fastest 50 runs in T20I, breaking the record by scoring 50 in just 9 balls against Mongolia in the 2022 Asian Games. During the match he hit 6 consecutive sixes but in two different overs, hitting 5 sixes in last five balls of an over and another one in next ball he faced in next over.

On 13 April 2024, Airee hit 6 sixes in 6 balls against Qatar during the group stage game in 2024 ACC Men's Premier Cup held in Oman in the final over of the inning. In May 2024, he was named in Nepal's squad for the 2024 ICC Men's T20 World Cup tournament.

In January 2026, Airee was named in Nepal's squad for 2026 T20I World Cup. During the tournament, Airee hit a match winning half century against Scotland. Nepal successfully chased down 171 in 19.2 overs due to his 23-ball 50, which helped them win their first T20WC match in 12 years.

In April 2026, Airee was made the captain of the T20I side, following the decision made by CAN to implement a split-captaincy model, while Rohit Paudel retained the ODI captaincy.

== T20 franchise cricket ==
In 2023, Airee played for the Montreal Tigers in the GT20 Canada. Where Montreal Tigers defeated Surrey Jaguars by 5 wickets to win their first title. In 2024, Airee played for the Vancouver Knights alongside other star players like Sandeep Lamichhane, Mohammad Amir.

In 2024 Airee, has been signed by Gulf Giants, a team in the International League T20 (ILT20), which serves as the official franchise league in the UAE under the administration of the Emirates Cricket Board. Giants retained Airee for upcoming 2025 season and has now secured his spot for the upcoming edition, showcasing his growing recognition in international franchise cricket
