= Kamal Singh Airee =

Nepalese cricketer (born 2000)

Personal information
- Full name: Kamal Singh Airee
- Born: 19 December 2000 (age 25); Baitadi, Nepal
- Batting: Right handed
- Bowling: Right arm medium

International information
- National side: Nepal (2020–2024)
- ODI debut (cap 23): 9 February 2020 v Oman
- Last ODI: 25 March 2022 v PNG
- T20I debut (cap 35): 22 April 2021 v Malaysia
- Last T20I: 2 April 2022 v Malaysia
- Source: Cricinfo, 2 April 2022

Kamal Singh Airee (born 19 December 2000) is a Nepalese cricketer. In November 2017, he was part of Nepal's U19 cricket team that beat India in the 2017 ACC Under-19 Asia Cup. In January 2020, he earned his first call-up to the national side, for the One Day International (ODI) tri-series in Nepal. He made his ODI debut against Oman, on 9 February 2020.

== Career ==
In April 2021, he was named in Nepal's Twenty20 International (T20I) squad for the 2020–21 Nepal Tri-Nation Series. He made his T20I debut on 22 April 2021, for Nepal against Malaysia. In May 2024, he was named in Nepal's squad for the 2024 ICC Men's T20 World Cup tournament.
