= Bibek Yadav =

Nepalese cricketer (born 2003)

Personal information
- Full name: Bibek Kumar Yadav
- Born: 7 October 2003 (age 23); Saptari, Madhesh Province, Nepal
- Batting: Right-handed
- Bowling: Right-arm medium

International information
- National side: Nepal (2022-present)
- ODI shirt no.: 71
- T20I debut (cap 37): 11 February 2022 v Oman
- Last T20I: 5 November 2023 v Oman
- T20I shirt no.: 71

Domestic team information
- Years: Team
- 2024-present: Lumbini Lions

Career statistics
Competition	T20I
Matches	11
Runs scored	58
Batting average	14.50
100s/50s	0/0
Top score	39
Catches/stumpings
- Source: ESPNcricinfo, 2 November 2023

Bibek Kumar Yadav (Nepali: बिबेक कुमार यादव, born 7 October 2003) is a Nepalese cricketer who plays for the Nepal national team. In February 2022, he was named in Nepal's Twenty20 International (T20I) squad for the 2021–22 Oman Quadrangular Series. Yadav made his T20I debut against Oman on 11 February 2022. He has been representing Madhesh Province Cricket Team in domestic cricket. He gained attention in recent match against Oman in ICC T20 world cup qualifier.

== Franchise cricket ==
- Lumbini Lions (NPL): In 2024, Yadav has picked by Lumbini Lions at the amount of Rs 15 Lakhs in Nepal Premier League
