= Sagar Dhakal =

Nepalese cricketer (born 2001)

Personal information
- Born: 14 December 2001 (age 24)
- Batting: Right-handed
- Bowling: Slow left arm orthodox
- Role: Bowler

International information
- National side: Nepal (2022-present)
- ODI debut (cap 28): 16 March 2022 v PNG
- Last ODI: 15 June 2022 v USA
- ODI shirt no.: 8
- T20I debut (cap 36): 2022 2022 v Oman
- Last T20I: 24 February 2022 v Oman
- T20I shirt no.: 8
- Source: Cricinfo, 15 June 2022

Sagar Dhakal (born 14 December 2001) is a Nepalese cricketer. In February 2022, he was named in Nepal's Twenty20 International (T20I) squad for the 2021–22 Oman Quadrangular Series. Dhakal made his T20I debut on 11 February 2022 against Oman. In March 2022, he was named in Nepal's One Day International (ODI) squad for the 2022United Arab Emirates Tri-Nation Series. He made his ODI debut on 16 March 2022, for Nepal against Papua New Guinea.

In May 2024, he was named in Nepal's squad for the 2024 ICC Men's T20 World Cup tournament.
