= Vinay Kumar Jha =

Nepalese cricket umpire

Personal information
- Full name: Vinay Kumar Jha
- Born: 21 June 1971 (age 55); Janakpur, Nepal
- Role: Umpire

Umpiring information
- ODIs umpired: 10 (2022–2024)
- T20Is umpired: 21 (2021–2024)
- WT20Is umpired: 25 (2019–2025)
- Source: Cricinfo, 02 May 2024

Vinay Kumar Jha (born 21 June 1971) is a Nepalese cricket umpire, who is on the Associates and Affiliates Umpire Panel of the International Cricket Council (ICC). He stood in matches in the 2009 ICC World Cricket League Division Six tournament and in the 2015–17 ICC World Cricket League Championship fixtures between Nepal and Kenya in March 2017.

On 18 April 2021, he stood in his first Twenty20 International (T20I) as an on-field umpire, in the match between the Netherlands and Malaysia in the 2020–21 Nepal Tri-Nation Series. On 26 March 2022, he stood in his first One Day International (ODI) as an on-field umpire, in the match between Nepal and Papua New Guinea in the 2021–22 Nepal T20I Tri-Nation Series. He has officiated in 8 ODIs, 12 T20Is and 19 women's T20Is.

== See also ==
- List of One Day International cricket umpires
- List of Twenty20 International cricket umpires
