= Bhim Sharki =

Nepalese cricketer (born 2001)

Personal information
- Born: 26 September 2001 (age 25); Kanchanpur, Nepal
- Batting: Right-handed
- Bowling: Right-arm off-break
- Role: Batsman

International information
- National side: Nepal (2022-present)
- ODI debut (cap 29): 22 March 2022 v PNG
- Last ODI: 12 February 2024 v Canada
- ODI shirt no.: 52
- T20I debut (cap 52): 19 June 2025 v Netherlands
- Last T20I: 20 June 2025 v Scotland
- T20I shirt no.: 52

Domestic team information
- Years: Team
- 2024–present: Kathmandu Gorkhas

Career statistics
Competition	ODI	T20I
Matches	32	2
Runs scored	862	39
Batting average	33.15	19.50
100s/50s	1/4	0/0
Top score	101*	27
Catches/stumpings	9/–	0/–
- Source: Cricinfo, 12 February 2024

Bhim Sharki (born 26 September 2001) is a Nepalese cricketer who plays for the Nepal national team. Sharki is a right-handed batsman and a right-arm orthodox bowler. In March 2022, he was named in Nepal's One Day International (ODI) squad for the 2022 United Arab Emirates Tri-Nation Series. Sharki made his ODI debut on 22 March 2022 against Papua New Guinea. He made his Twenty20 debut on 2 May 2022, against Zimbabwe A. In April 2023, he was named in Nepal's squad for the 2023 ACC Men's Premier Cup.

== Franchise cricket ==
- Kathmandu Gurkhas (NPL): In 2024, Sharki has picked by Kathmandu Gurkhas at the amount of Rs 15 Lakhs in Nepal Premier League
