= Rohit Paudel =

Nepalese cricketer (born 2002)

Rohit Kumar Paudel
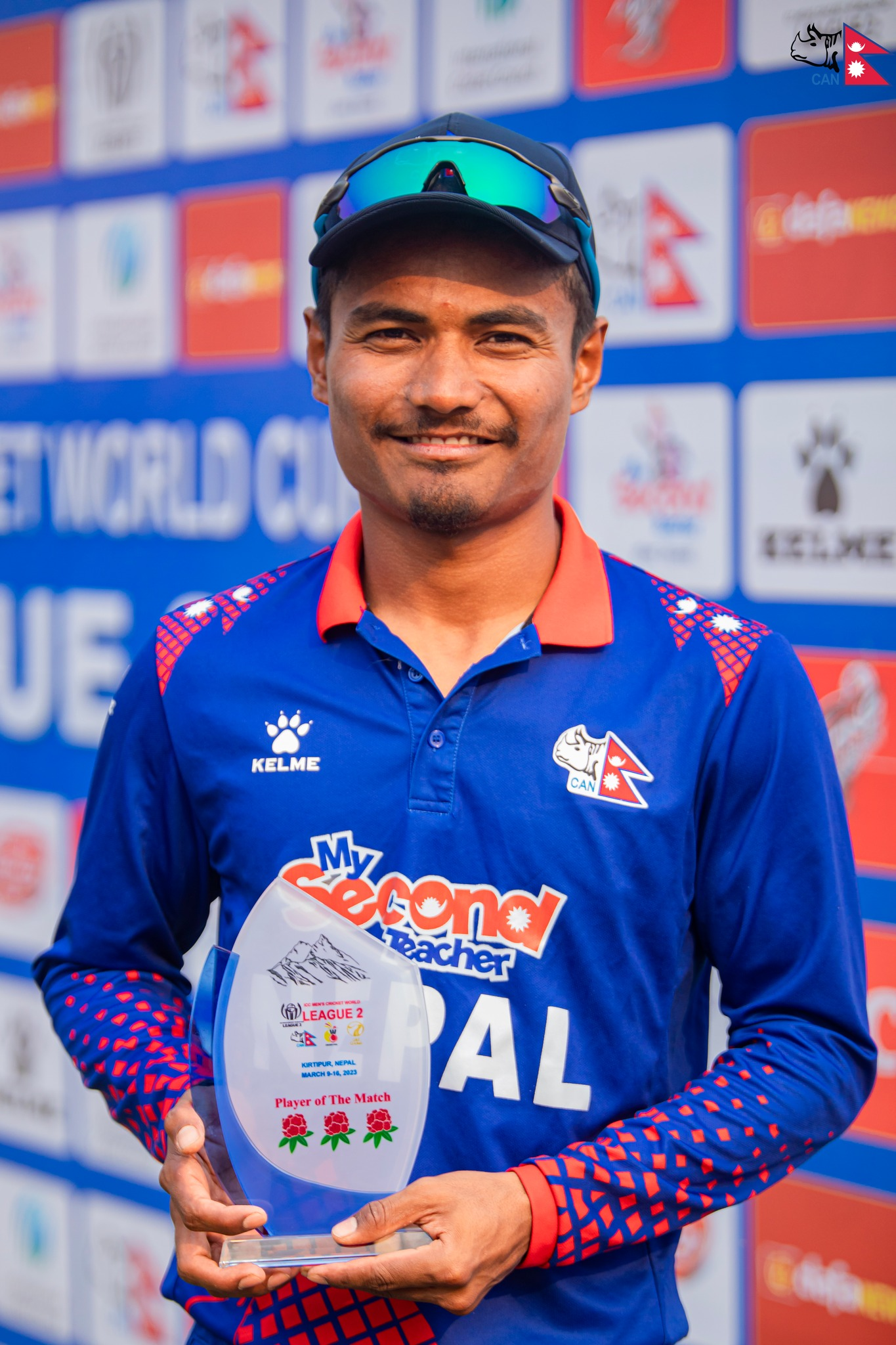

Personal information
- Full name: Rohit Kumar Paudel
- Born: 2 September 2002 (age 24); Nawalparasi, Nepal
- Height: 5 ft 7 in (1.70 m)
- Batting: Right-handed
- Bowling: Right-arm offbreak
- Role: Batting all-rounder

International information
- National side: Nepal
- ODI debut (cap 36): 3 August 2018 v Netherlands
- Last ODI: 5 May 2026 v Oman
- ODI shirt no.: 17
- T20I debut (cap 25): 31 January 2019 v UAE
- Last T20I: 17 February 2026 v Scotland
- T20I shirt no.: 17

Domestic team information
- Years: Team
- 2021–2022: Tribhuwan Army Club
- 2021: Bhairahawa Gladiators
- 2022–2023: Biratnagar Super Kings
- 2024–present: APF Club
- 2024–present: Toronto Nationals
- 2024–present: Lumbini Lions

Career statistics
Competition	ODI	T20I
Matches	80	80
Runs scored	2,060	1,720
Batting average	29.01	27.30
100s/50s	2/11	0/8
Top score	126	61
Balls bowled	371	239
Wickets	10	14
Bowling average	27.00	18.64
5 wickets in innings	0	0
10 wickets in match	0	0
Best bowling	4/22	2/7
Catches/stumpings	28/–	41/–
Medal record
Representing Nepal
Men's Cricket
South Asian Games
Bronze medal – third place	2019 Kathmandu/Pokhara	Team
- Source: Cricinfo, 10 May 2026

Rohit Kumar Paudel (born 2 September 2002) is a Nepalese cricketer and former captain of the Nepal national cricket team. He made his List A debut for Nepal in the 2018 ICC World Cricket League Division Two tournament on 8 February 2018. He was inspired to play cricket after Nepal played in the 2014 ICC World Twenty20 in Bangladesh. In January 2019, paudel became the youngest male cricketer to score an international half-century. The record was broken in February 2020 by his teammate Kushal Malla. He is the all-time highest run scorer for Nepal in the ODI format and the first Nepalese player to score 2000 runs in ODI cricket. He was named captain of the Nepal cricket team in November 2022.

== International career ==
In July 2018, he was named in Nepal's squad for their One Day International (ODI) series against the Netherlands. These were Nepal's first ODI matches since gaining ODI status during the 2018 Cricket World Cup Qualifier. He made his Twenty20 debut for Nepal in the 2018 MCC Tri-Nation Series against the Marylebone Cricket Club on 29 July 2018.

Rohit Paudel marked his entry into ODI cricket for Nepal during a match against the Netherlands on August 3, 2018. Remarkably, at the age of 15 years and 335 days, he joined the ranks as the fourth-youngest player to debut in an ODI. During his inaugural ODI appearance, he contributed 6 runs off just 15 balls, showcasing his early potential with a boundary. Batting in the number 6 position, Paudel was caught out during the course of the match.

In August 2018, he was named in Nepal's squad for the 2018 Asia Cup Qualifier tournament. In the match against the United Arab Emirates (UAE) on August 30, 2018, Rohit Paudel contributed 9 runs to Nepal's innings. It was his second ODI match. He faced 14 deliveries during his time at the crease, scoring at a strike rate of 64.28. However, he was dismissed after hitting 2 boundaries, caught by the opposition.

In October 2018, he was the leading run-scorer for Nepal in the 2018 ACC Under-19 Asia Cup, with 161 runs in three matches.

On 26 January 2019, at the age of 16 years and 146 days on his third ODI match, Paudel became the youngest male cricketer to score an international half-century. He scored 55 runs from 58 balls in the second ODI against the United Arab Emirates at the ICC Academy Ground in Dubai. on his fourth ODI, the next game, he scored 16 runs off 24 balls.

In January 2019, he was named in Nepal's Twenty20 International (T20I) squad for the series against the United Arab Emirates. He made his T20I debut for Nepal against the United Arab Emirates on 31 January 2019. In this match, Rohit batted in the 6th position and scored 4 runs off 8 balls. He managed to hit 1 four during his innings and had a strike rate of 50.00. Paudel was eventually dismissed by being caught out.

In April 2019, he was named as the captain of Nepal's squad for the Asia qualification tournament for the 2020 Under-19 Cricket World Cup. In Nepal's opening match of the tournament, against Singapore, Paudel scored 95 runs from 105 balls.

In June 2019, he was named in Nepal's squad for the Regional Finals of the 2018–19 ICC T20 World Cup Asia Qualifier tournament. He played 5 T20I in the tournament scoring 5,19, DNB, 6*, & 5 runs at an average of 8.75.

Rohit was part of the 2019–20 Oman Pentangular Series played between 5–10 October 2019. He was part of 2 out of 4 t20i matches against Hong Kong & Netherlands respectively scoring 5 runs each.

In November 2019, he was named in Nepal's squad for the 2019 ACC Emerging Teams Asia Cup in Bangladesh. Later the same month, he was also named in Nepal's squad for the men's cricket tournament at the 2019 South Asian Games hosted by Nepal. Nepal played 3 T20I matches in the tournament- 1 vs Bhutan and 2 vs Maldives respectively. other matches were list-A matches against the U-23 sides of full nation teams. Rohit scored 6, 10 & 15* runs respectively in 3 T20I.

In September 2020, he was one of eighteen cricketers to be awarded with a central contract by the Cricket Association of Nepal.

On 25 March 2022, in the first match of a two-match series against Papua New Guinea, Paudel scored his first century in an ODI match with 126 runs.

In May 2023, under his captaincy, Nepal won the 2023 ACC Men's Premier Cup and qualified to play in the 2023 Asia Cup hosted by Pakistan.

In September 2023, Rohit was named Captain of the 2023 Asian games in China, debuting his T20I captaincy against Mongolia.

He was the man of the series in the Canada Tour of Nepal in 2024. In May 2024, he was named as the captain in Nepal's squad for the 2024 ICC Men's T20 World Cup tournament.

In January 2026, Paudel was named as the captain of Nepal's squad for 2026 T20I World Cup.

== Franchise cricket ==
- Global T20 League Canada: In June 2024, Paudel made his debut in an international franchise league by signing with the Toronto Nationals for the Global T20 League Canada 2024. He played alongside Shaheen Afridi, Colin Munro, Romario Shepherd, and Rassie Van Der Dussen.
- Nepal Premier League: In the inaugural season of the Nepal Premier League, Paudel played for Lumbini Lions. Despite the team finishing last in the standings, Paudel was the leading run scorer of the tournament, scoring 279 runs from 7 matches. In the second season of the NPL, Rohit's team, the Lumbini Lions, finished in first place. Paudel was named the top Nepali player in NPL Season 2 and received a luxury car and a motorcycle. He became the most awarded player in NPL history.

== Honours ==
- Player of the Year (Male) at the NSJF Sports Award: 2024
