= 2021 Everest Premier League =

4th edition of the Nepalese cricket tournament

- Dates: 25 September – 9 October 2021
- Administrator: EPL Pvt. Ltd.
- Cricket format: Twenty20
- Tournament format(s): Single round robin and playoffs
- Champions: Chitwan Tigers (1st title)
- Runners-up: Pokhara Rhinos
- Participants: 6
- Matches: 19
- Player of the series: Sagar Dhakal (Chitwan Tigers)
- Most runs: Mohammad Shahzad (Chitwan Tigers); 207 runs
- Most wickets: Sagar Dhakal (Chitwan Tigers); 14 wickets

The 2021 Everest Premier League, also known as EPL4 or Bajaj Pulsar EPL for sponsorship reasons, was the fourth edition of the Everest Premier League, a professional men's domestic Twenty20 cricket competition in Nepal. The event was initially scheduled for December 2019, before being postponed multiple times. Lalitpur Patriots were the defending champions, having won their first title in 2018, but were eliminated in the group stage after finishing fifth.

== Background ==
The fourth edition of the Everest Premier League was originally scheduled to be held from 8 to 22 December 2019, but was rescheduled to run from 29 February to 14 March 2020. but was rescheduled again, to run from 14 to 28 March 2020. On 5 March, the event was postponed again due to the coronavirus pandemic. In February 2021, the 2021 Everest Premier League dates were announced by the Cricket Association of Nepal as 25 September – 9 October 2021. The dates were chosen to coincide with the Vijayadashami festival in Nepal. All matches will be played at the Tribhuvan University International Cricket Ground in Kathmandu.

The prize money for the competition has been doubled from the 2018 edition, and will be 5 million nepalese rupees (NPR). The runners-up will earn 1.5 million NPR.

== Venues ==
Kathmandu
Tribhuvan University International Cricket Ground
Capacity: 25,000+
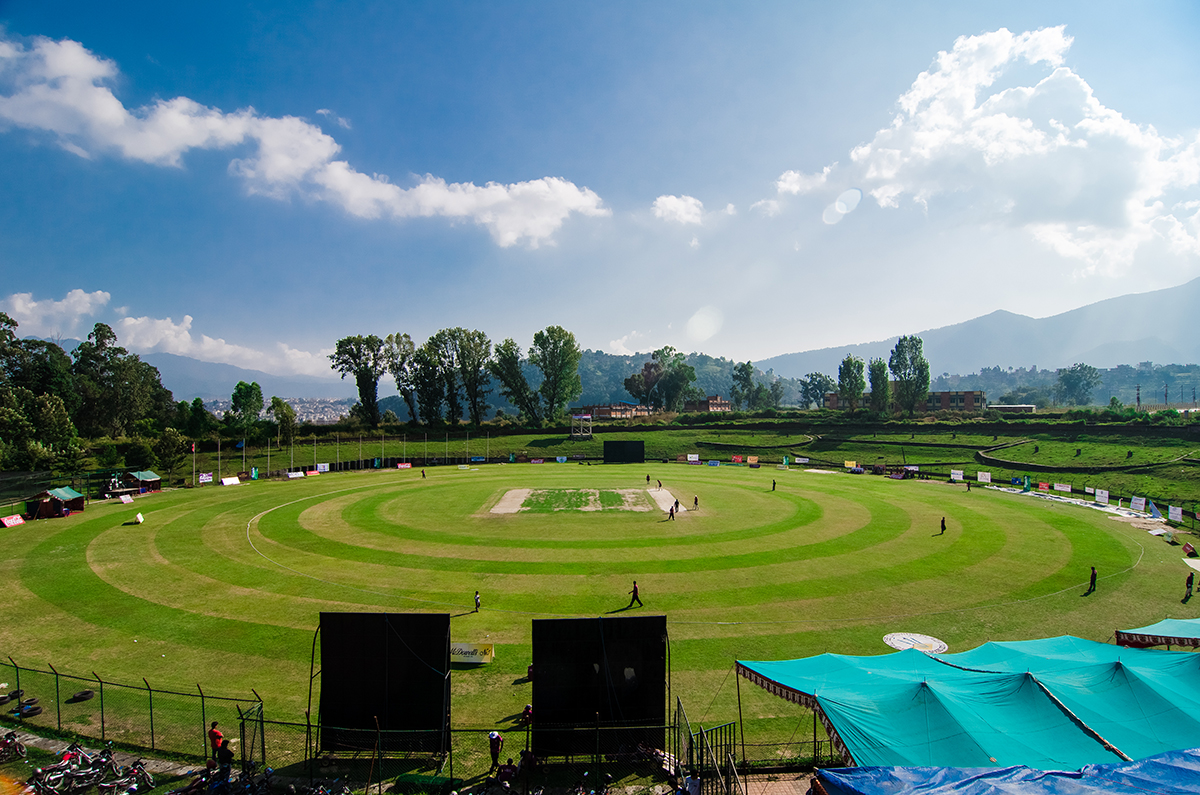
TU International Cricket Ground is the host for all matches of the tournament.

== Squads ==
Bhairahawa Gladiators	Biratnagar Warriors	Chitwan Tigers	Kathmandu Kings XI	Lalitpur Patriots	Pokhara Rhinos
Tamim Iqbal; Upul Tharanga; Dhammika Prasad; Sharvin Muniandy; Sharad Vesawkar (c); Pradeep Airee; Aarif Sheikh; Rohit Kumar Paudel; Bhuwan Karki; Kushal Malla; Abinash Bohara; Krishna Karki; Harishankar Shah; Dipesh Shrestha; Himanshu Dutta; Bikash Agri	Karan KC (c); Pratish GC; Sikandar Raza; Chandrapaul Hemraj; Rayyan Pathan; Dilshan Munaweera; Basant Regmi; Aasif Sheikh; Anil Sah; Sumit Maharjan; Ramnaresh Giri; Hari Bahadur Chauhan; Anil Kharel; Bikram Kumar Bhusal; Saurav Khanal	Mohammad Shahzad; Seekkuge Prasanna; Karim Janat; Virandeep Singh; Sompal Kami (c); Dilip Nath; Lalit Bhandari; Bhim Sharki; Ishan Pandey; Sandeep Sunar; Kamal Singh Airee; Shahab Alam; Sagar Dhakal; Aadil Khan; Khadak Bohara	Shahid Afridi; Janak Prakash; Ryan Burl; Rahmanullah Gurbaz; Ashan Priyanjan; Dipendra Singh Airee; Sandeep Lamichhane (c); Jitendra Mukhiya; Subash Khakurel; Amrit Bhattarai; Amit Shrestha; Raju Rijal; M Samsad Sheikh; Amar Singh Routela; Akash Chand; Sher Malla; Dipendra Rawat	Azmatullah Omarzai; Ranjung Mikyo Dorji; Oshada Fernando; Sandun Weerakkody; Jaykishan Kolsawala; Lalit Rajbanshi; Pawan Sarraf; Sundeep Jora; Kushal Bhurtel (c); Shankar Rana; Sonu Tamang; Rashid Khan; Yogendra Singh Karki; Surya Tamang	Kesrick Williams; Sahan Arachchige; Asela Gunaratne; Richard Levi; Binod Bhandari (c); Prithu Baskota; Sunil Dhamala; Sushan Bhari; Kishore Mahato; Bikram Sob; Bipin Khatri; Nandan Yadav; Rit Gautam; Lokesh Bam; Dev khanal; Bipin Rawal

- Source: Yahoo! Sports

== Points table ==
Pos	Team	Pld	W	L	T	NR	Pts	NRR
1	Chitwan Tigers	5	4	1	0	0	8	0.489
2	Pokhara Rhinos	5	3	1	0	1	7 (Note: Total wins: Pokhara Rhinos 3, Bhairahawa Gladiators 2.)	0.023
3	Bhairahawa Gladiators	5	2	0	1	2	7	0.971
4	Kathmandu Kings XI	5	1	3	0	1	3	0.467
5	Lalitpur Patriots	5	1	3	1	0	3	−0.601
6	Biratnagar Warriors	5	1	4	0	0	2	−1.143

Source: Cricinfo
Notes:
- The top four teams qualify for the playoffs.
  - advance to Qualifier 1.
  - advance to Eliminator.

== League matches ==
The schedule was published on 8 September 2021.

Match 1
25 September 2021
12:15
Scorecard

Lalitpur Patriots; 157/8 (20 overs)	v	Kathmandu Kings XI; 160/3 (14.2 overs)
Pawan Sarraf 61 (44); Jitendra Mukhiya 4/18 (4 overs)		Ryan Burl 73* (34); Pawan Sarraf 1/25 (3 overs)

Kathmandu Kings XI won by 7 wickets
TU Cricket Ground, Kirtipur
Umpires: Buddhi Pradhan and Durga Subedi
Player of the match: Ryan Burl (Kings XI)

- Kathmandu Kings XI won the toss and elected to field.

Match 2
26 September 2021
09:30
Scorecard

Biratnagar Warriors; 151/9 (20 overs)	v	Chitwan Tigers; 155/8 (20 overs)
Sikandar Raza 67 (47); Sagar Dhakal 2/14 (3 overs)		Rajesh Pulami 43* (39); Karan KC 2/30 (4 overs)

Chitwan Tigers won by 2 wickets
TU Cricket Ground, Kirtipur
Umpires: Durga Subedi and Sanjay Gurung
Player of the match: Kamal Airee (Tigers)

- Chitwan Tigers won the toss and elected to field.

Match 3
26 September 2021
13:30
Scorecard

Pokhara Rhinos; 65/7 (10.1 overs)	v	Bhairahawa Gladiators
Asela Gunaratne 23 (16); Durgesh Gupta 3/16 (3 overs)

No result
TU Cricket Ground, Kirtipur
Umpires: Buddhi Pradhan and Vinay Kumar Jha

- Pokhara Rhinos won the toss and elected to bat.
- No further play was possible due to rain.

Match 4
3 October 2021
09:30
Scorecard

Biratnagar Warriors; 104/5 (8 overs)	v	Kathmandu Kings XI; 97/3 (8 overs)
Anil Sah 45* (16); Ryan Burl 1/17 (2 overs)		Rahmanullah Gurbaz 28 (15); Rayyan Pathan 2/30 (2 overs)

Biratnagar Warriors won by 7 runs
TU Cricket Ground, Kirtipur
Umpires: Ram Yadav and Vinay Kumar Jha
Player of the match: Anil Sah (Warriors)

- Kathmandu Kings XI won the toss and elected to field.
- Match was reduced to 8 overs per side due to rain.
- Match was rescheduled from 27 September due to rain.

Match 5
4 October 2021
09:30
Scorecard

Chitwan Tigers; 164/8 (20 overs)	v	Bhairahawa Gladiators; 165/4 (17.5 overs)
Karim Janat 35 (37); Abinash Bohara 3/38 (4 overs)		Pradeep Airee 72 (43); Karim Janat 2/23 (3 overs)

Bhairahawa Gladiators won by 6 wickets
TU Cricket Ground, Kirtipur
Umpires: Sanjay Gurung and Vinay Kumar Jha
Player of the match: Pradeep Airee (Gladiators)

- Chitwan Tigers won the toss and elected to bat.
- Match was rescheduled from 27 September due to rain.

Match 6
4 October 2021
12:15
Scorecard

Kathmandu Kings XI; 182/8 (20 overs)	v	Pokhara Rhinos; 142/5 (15 overs)
Amit Shrestha 56 (41); Bibek Yadav 3/7 (1 over)		Sahan Arachchige 43 (23); Gulshan Jha 2/29 (3 overs)

Pokhara Rhinos won by 14 runs (DLS method)
TU Cricket Ground, Kirtipur
Umpires: Durga Subedi and Ram Yadav
Player of the match: Bibek Yadav (Rhinos)

- Pokhara Rhinos won the toss and elected to field.
- No further play was possible due to rain. Rhinos were 14 runs ahead of the par score.
- Match was rescheduled from 28 September due to rain.

Match 7
29 September 2021
09:30
Scorecard

Lalitpur Patriots; 51/6 (7 overs)	v	Pokhara Rhinos; 55/1 (6.3 overs)
Sandun Weerakkody 19 (16); Nandan Yadav 3/11 (2 overs)		Richard Levi 38* (22); Azmatullah Omarzai 1/11 (2 overs)

Pokhara Rhinos won by 9 wickets
TU Cricket Ground, Kirtipur
Umpires: Buddhi Pradhan and Ram Yadav
Player of the match: Nandan Yadav (Rhinos)

- Pokhara Rhinos won the toss and elected to field.
- Match was reduced to 7 overs per side due to rain.

Match 8
29 September 2021
13:30
Scorecard

Biratnagar Warriors; 89 (17.4 overs)	v	Bhairahawa Gladiators; 92/4 (15.3 overs)
Dilshan Munaweera 25 (20); Dhammika Prasad 3/6 (3 overs)		Upul Tharanga 34 (35); Ramnaresh Giri 2/30 (4 overs)

Bhairahawa Gladiators won by 6 wickets
TU Cricket Ground, Kirtipur
Umpires: Durga Subedi and Sanjay Gurung
Player of the match: Dhammika Prasad (Gladiators)

- Bhairahawa Gladiators won the toss and elected to field.

Match 9
30 September 2021
09:30
Scorecard

Kathmandu Kings XI; 141/8 (20 overs)	v	Chitwan Tigers; 142/7 (18.4 overs)
Subash Khakurel 35 (34); Sagar Dhakal 4/21 (4 overs)		Rajesh Pulami 26 (29); Ryan Burl 2/13 (4 overs)

Chitwan Tigers won by 3 wickets
TU Cricket Ground, Kirtipur
Umpires: Buddhi Pradhan and Vinay Kumar Jha
Player of the match: Sagar Dhakal (Tigers)

- Chitwan Tigers won the toss and elected to field.

Match 10
30 September 2021
13:30
Scorecard

Lalitpur Patriots; 177/7 (20 overs)	v	Bhairahawa Gladiators; 177/5 (20 overs)
Sandun Weerakkody 58 (41); Abinash Bohara 2/47 (4 overs)		Upul Tharanga 67* (44); Rashid Khan 3/34 (4 overs)

Match tied
TU Cricket Ground, Kirtipur
Umpires: Durga Subedi and Sanjay Gurung
Player of the match: Upul Tharanga (Gladiators)

- Bhairahawa Gladiators won the toss and elected to field.
- Super Over was not played due to bad light.

Match 11
1 October 2021
09:30
Scorecard

Lalitpur Patriots; 226/5 (20 overs)	v	Biratnagar Warriors; 189/8 (20 overs)
Sandun Weerakkody 73 (43); Karan KC 2/43 (4 overs)		Dilshan Munaweera 59 (39); Azmatullah Omarzai 4/42 (4 overs)

Lalitpur Patriots won by 37 runs
TU Cricket Ground, Kirtipur
Umpires: Buddhi Pradhan and Ram Yadav
Player of the match: Azmatullah Omarzai (Patriots)

- Biratnagar Warriors won the toss and elected to field.

Match 12
1 October 2021
13:30
Scorecard

Pokhara Rhinos; 123/7 (20 overs)	v	Chitwan Tigers; 124/1 (16.4 overs)
Bibek Yadav 53* (45); Shahab Alam 2/17 (4 overs)		Mohammad Shahzad 63* (52); Bikram Sob 1/19 (3 overs)

Chitwan Tigers won by 9 wickets
TU Cricket Ground, Kirtipur
Umpires: Durga Subedi and Sanjay Gurung
Player of the match: Mohammad Shahzad (Tigers)

- Pokhara Rhinos won the toss and elected to bat.

Match 13
5 October 2021
09:30
Scorecard

Kathmandu Kings XI	v	Bhairahawa Gladiators

Match abandoned
TU Cricket Ground, Kirtipur
Umpires: Ram Yadav and Vinay Kumar Jha

- No play was possible due to wet outfield.
- Match was rescheduled from 3 October due to wet outfield.

Match 14
2 October 2021
13:30
Scorecard

Biratnagar Warriors; 172/5 (20 overs)	v	Pokhara Rhinos; 173/3 (17.4 overs)
Aasif Sheikh 44 (33); Bikram Sob 2/33 (4 overs)		Asela Gunaratne 50* (24); Pratis GC 1/19 (3 overs)

Pokhara Rhinos won by 7 wickets
TU Cricket Ground, Kirtipur
Umpires: Ram Yadav and Sanjay Gurung
Player of the match: Sahan Arachchige (Rhinos)

- Pokhara Rhinos won the toss and elected to field.

Match 15
3 October 2021
12:15
Scorecard

Lalitpur Patriots; 108/9 (20 overs)	v	Chitwan Tigers; 112/5 (17.2 overs)
Jaykishan Kolsawala 42 (33); Kamal Singh Airee 3/11 (4 overs)		Mohammad Shahzad 35 (28); Rijan Dhakal 2/11 (2 overs)

Chitwan Tigers won by 5 wickets
TU Cricket Ground, Kirtipur
Umpires: Durga Subedi and Sanjay Gurung
Player of the match: Kamal Singh Airee (Tigers)

- Lalitpur Patriots won the toss and elected to bat.

== Playoff stage ==
Semifinals
6 October
Chitwan Tigers	68/1
Pokhara Rhinos	66
6 October
Bhairahawa Gladiators	188/8
Kathmandu Kings XI	172/8

Preliminary final
7 October
2	Pokhara Rhinos	123/3
3	Bhairahawa Gladiators	119/6

Final
9 October
1	Chitwan Tigers	114/6
2	Pokhara Rhinos	111

=== Preliminary ===
==== Qualifier 1 ====
Match 16
6 October 2021
09:30
Scorecard

Pokhara Rhinos; 66 (15 overs)	v	Chitwan Tigers; 68/1 (7.5 overs)
Richard Levi 19 (12); Shahab Alam 4/10 (4 overs)		Mohammad Shahzad 48 (26); Nandan Yadav 1/23 (1.5 overs)

Chitwan Tigers won by 9 wickets
TU Cricket Ground, Kirtipur
Umpires: Ram Yadav and Vinay Kumar Jha
Player of the match: Shahab Alam (Tigers)

- Chitwan Tigers won the toss and elected to field.

==== Eliminator ====
Match 17
6 October 2021
13:30
Scorecard

Bhairahawa Gladiators; 188/8 (20 overs)	v	Kathmandu Kings XI; 172/8 (20 overs)
Sharad Vesawkar 49 (20); Ashan Priyanjan 2/17 (3 overs)		Ashan Priyanjan 68 (48); Kushal Malla 2/22 (3 overs)

Bhairahawa Gladiators won by 16 runs
TU Cricket Ground, Kirtipur
Umpires: Sanjay Gurung and Durga Subedi
Player of the match: Sharad Vesawkar (Gladiators)

- Bhairahawa Gladiators won the toss and elected to bat.

==== Qualifier 2 ====
Match 18
7 October 2021
12:15
Scorecard

Bhairahawa Gladiators; 119/6 (20 overs)	v	Pokhara Rhinos; 123/3 (18.2 overs)
Sharad Vesawkar 32* (33); Sahan Arachchige 2/15 ( 4 overs)		Sahan Arachchige 53* (44); Bhuvan Karki 2/16 (3 overs)

Pokhara Rhinos won by 7 wickets
TU Cricket Ground, Kirtipur
Umpires: Durga Subedi and Sanjay Gurung
Player of the match: Sahan Arachchige (Rhinos)

- Pokhara Rhinos won the toss and elected to field.

=== Final ===
Match 19
9 October 2021
12:15
Scorecard

Pokhara Rhinos; 111 (17.5 overs)	v	Chitwan Tigers; 114/6 (15.5 overs)
Asela Gunaratne 34 (24); Kamal Airee 4/20 (3.5 overs)		Bhim Sharki 63 (45); Kishore Mahato 4/27 (3.5 overs)

Chitwan Tigers won by 4 wickets
TU Cricket Ground, Kirtipur
Umpires: Durga Subedi and Vinay Kumar Jha
Player of the match: Kamal Airee (Tigers)

- Chitwan Tigers won the toss and elected to field.
