= 2018 Everest Premier League =

- Dates: 8 – 22 December 2018
- Administrator: EPL Pvt Ltd
- Cricket format: Twenty20
- Tournament format(s): Single round robin and playoffs
- Champions: Lalitpur Patriots (1st title)
- Participants: 6
- Matches: 19
- Player of the series: Divyam Adhikari (Gladiators)
- Most runs: Ravi Inder Singh (337)
- Most wickets: Saurab Neupane (Gladiators) (12)
- Official website: eplt20.com.np

The 2018 Everest Premier League, also known as EPL3 or 2018 TVS EPL because of the sponsorship reason, was the third edition of the Everest Premier League, a professional men's domestic Twenty20 cricket competition in Nepal. The tournament was held from 8 December 2018 to 22 December 2018. Biratnagar Warriors were defending champions for the tournament but they were eliminated in the group stage. Lalitpur Patriots won the 2018 season and it's their first title.

== Players Release and Bidding ==
The players release and bidding process was held on 11 November 2018 and broadcast live on the official Facebook page of EPL in the presence of Raman Shiwakoti, chief of EPL technical committee and the manager of Nepal men's national cricket team. In the player release and bidding process, each team could release maximum of three players and they could bid for the released players as well as the unsold players and the players who did not register for 2017 EPL auction. Hari Chauhan was the most bidded player (NPR 85,000) in the process by Biratnagar Warriors. Tigers acquired Sagar Dhakal and Adil Khan. Kings XI brought in Samsaad Sheikh while Rhinos secured Shubhendu Pandey and Nandan Yadav. Gladiators did not bid and Patriots did not release any players.

== Venues ==
TU International Cricket Ground is the host for all matches of the tournament

== Teams and squads ==
The marquee players from the 2017 Everest Premier League were retained by their respective teams as a part of a three-year agreement. The franchise teams are obliged to select at least three foreign players and one local player from the talent hunt program as per the Everest Premier League regulation.

Bhairahawa Gladiators	Biratnagar Warriors	Chitwan Tigers	Kathmandu Kings XI	Lalitpur Patriots	Pokhara Rhinos
Sharad Vesawkar (c); Pradeep Airee; Aarif Sheikh; Rohit Kumar Paudel; Bhuwan Karki; Krishna Karki; Prakash KC; Anil Kharel; Kushal Malla; Harishankar Shah; Dipesh Shrestha; Bhupendra Thapa; Ryan Ten Doeschate; Mohammad Naveed; Ravi Inder Singh; Puneet Mehra	Paras Khadka (c); Karan KC; Basant Regmi; Anil Sah; Aasif Sheikh; Aakash Bista; Hari Bahadur Chauhan; Ramnaresh Giri; Dipesh Kandel; Pranit Thapa Magar; Sumit Maharjan; Puspa Thapa; Babar Hayat; Paul van Meekeren; Roelof van der Merwe; Smit Patel	Prithu Baskota (c); Dipendra Airee; Lalit Bhandari; Dilip Nath; Bhim Sharki; Kamal Singh Airee; Shahab Alam; Sagar Dhakal; Aadil Khan; Ishan Pandey; Sandeep Sunar; Aakash Thapa; Paul Stirling; John Simpson; George Scott	Sompal Kami (c); Naresh Budhayer; Siddhant Lohani; Jitendra Mukhiya; Sagar Pun; Raju Rijal; Bikram Bhusal; Amar Singh Routela; Samshad Sheikh; Amit Shrestha; Nitesh Thapa; Puran BK; Subramanian Anand; Rohan Mustafa; Kevin O'Brien; Pardeep Sahu	Gyanendra Malla (c); Sundeep Jora; Sandeep Lamichhane; Lalit Rajbanshi; Pawan Sarraf; Kushal Bhurtel; Sumit Jha; Yogendra Singh Karki; Rashaid Khan; Shankar Rana; Sonu Tamang; Jaykishan Kolsawala; Sunny Patel; Gourav Tomar	Shakti Gauchan; Binod Bhandari; Sushan Bhari; Sunil Dhamala; Rajesh Pulami Magar; Saurabh Khanal; Bipin Khatri; Kishore Mahato; Shubhendu Pandey; Dev Shah; Bikram Sob; Nandan Yadav; Kyle Coetzer (c); Sunny Bhimsaria; Paul Coughlin; Richard Levi

== Points table ==
Team	M	W	L	T	NR	Points	NRR
Lalitpur Patriots	5	4	1	0	0	8	+1.747
Kathmandu Kings XI	5	4	1	0	0	8	-0.279
Bhairahawa Gladiators	5	3	2	0	0	6	-0.370
Chitwan Tigers	5	2	3	0	0	4	-0.185
Biratnagar Warriors	5	2	3	0	0	4	-0.250
Pokhara Rhinos	5	0	5	0	0	0	-0.627

- The four top ranked teams will qualify for the playoffs
- advanced to Qualifier 1
- advanced to the Eliminator

== League matches ==
=== Match 1 ===
8 December
13:00
Scorecard

Lalitpur Patriots; 104/9 (20 overs)	v	Biratnagar Warriors; 105/7 (19.5 overs)
Gyanendra Malla 49(52) van der Merwe 2/14 (4 overs)		Karan KC 36(19)*; Gaurav Tomar 3/10 (4 overs)

Warriors won by 3 wickets
TU Cricket Ground, Kirtipur
Umpires: Vinay Kumar Jha and Sanjay Gurung
Player of the match: Karan KC (Warriors)

- Patriots elected to bat first

=== Match 2 ===
9 December
09:00
Scorecard

Lalitpur Patriots; 143/5 (20 overs)	v	Chitwan Tigers; 132/8 (20 overs)
Sonu Tamang 35(24)*; George Scott 2/24 (3 overs)		Dipendra Singh Airee 41(45); Sandeep Lamichhane 3/26 (4 overs)

Patriots won by 11 runs
TU Cricket Ground, Kirtipur
Umpires: Vinay Kumar Jha and Ram Yadav
Player of the match: Sandeep Lamichhane (Patriots)

- Patriots elected to bat first

=== Match 3 ===
9 December
13:00
Scorecard

Pokhara Rhinos; 215/5 (20 overs)	v	Bhairahawa Gladiators; 216/6 (19.4 overs)
Richard Levi 79(36); Avinash Bohara 1/33 (4 overs)		Ravi Inder Singh 125(60)*; Bikram Sob 2/25 (3.4 overs)

Gladiators won by 4 wickets
TU Cricket Ground, Kirtipur
Umpires: Sanjay Gurung and Hiralal Raut
Player of the match: Ravi Inder Singh (Gladiators)

- Rhinos, elected to bat first

=== Match 4 ===
10 December
09:00
Scorecard

Chitwan Tigers; 160/10 (19.5 overs)	v	Kathmandu Kings XI; 164/4 (18.5 overs)
Dipendra Singh Airee 45(40); Samshad Sheikh 3/18 (2.5 overs)		Subramanian Anand 43(18)*; Shahab Alam 2/26 (4 overs)

Kings XI won by 6 wickets
TU Cricket Ground, Kirtipur
Umpires: Vinay Kumar Jha and Ram Yadav
Player of the match: Subramanian Anand (Kings XI)

- Kings XI, elected to bowl first

=== Match 5 ===
10 December
13:00
Scorecard

Pokhara Rhinos; 166/4 (20 overs)	v	Lalitpur Patriots; 171/2 (15.5 overs)
Richard Levi 84(39); Pawan Sarraf 3/31 (4 overs)		Gaurav Tomar 82(41); Susan Bhari 1/26 (4 overs)

Patriots won by 8 wickets
TU Cricket Ground, Kirtipur
Umpires: Sanjay Gurung and Hiralal Raut
Player of the match: Gaurav Tomar (Patriots)

- Rhinos, elected to bat first

=== Match 6 ===
10 December
09:00
Scorecard

Pokhara Rhinos; 84/7 (20 overs)	v	Biratnagar Warriors; 84/10 (19.3 overs)
Paul Coughlin 20(27) van Meekeren 3/17 (4 overs)		Aasif Sheikh 19(13); Bipin Khatri 3/15 (4 overs)

Match tied (Warriors won the one-over eliminator)
TU Cricket Ground, Kirtipur
Umpires: Vinay Kumar Jha and Hiralal Raut
Player of the match: Karan KC (Warriors)

- Warriors, elected to field first

=== Match 7 ===
10 December
13:00
Scorecard

Bhairahawa Gladiators; 143/10 (19.3 overs)	v	Chitwan Tigers; 131/9 (20 overs)
Ryan Ten Doeschate 35(25); George Scott 2/13 (3.3 overs)		Paul Stirling 38(23); Ravi Inder Singh 2/23 (3 overs)

Gladiators won by 12 runs
TU Cricket Ground, Kirtipur
Umpires: Vinay Kumar Jha and Hiralal Raut
Player of the match: Ryan Ten Doeschate (Gladiators)

- Tigers, elected to field first

=== Match 8 ===
10 December
09:00
Scorecard

Biratnagar Warriors; 91/10 (18.4 overs)	v	Bhairahawa Gladiators; 92/6 (19.4 overs)
van der Merwe 25(29); Mohammad Naveed 4/14 (4 overs)		Ryan Ten Doeschate 20(33) van der Merwe 2/10 (4 overs)

Gladiators won by 4 wickets
TU Cricket Ground, Kirtipur
Umpires: Sanjay Gurung and Hiralal Raut
Player of the match: Mohammad Naveed (Gladiators)

- Gladiators, elected to field first

== Statistics ==
Most runs
Player	Team	Runs
Ravi Inder Singh	Bhairahawa Gladiators	337
Dipendra Singh Airee	Chitwan Tigers	231
Gaurav Tomar	Lalitpur Patriots	229
Richard Levi	Pokhara Rhinos	204
Jaiskishan Kolsawala	Lalitpur Patriots	188

- Source: ESPNcricinfo, 22 December 2018

Most wickets
Player	Team	Wickets
Mohammad Naveed	Bhairahawa Gladiators	12
Pawan Sarraf	Lalitpur Patriots	11
Pardeep Sahu	Kathmandu Kings XI	10
Sunny Patel	Lalitpur Patriots	10
Lalit Bhandari	Chitwan Tigers	10

- Source: ESPNcricinfo, 22 December 2018
