= List of Nepal One Day International records =

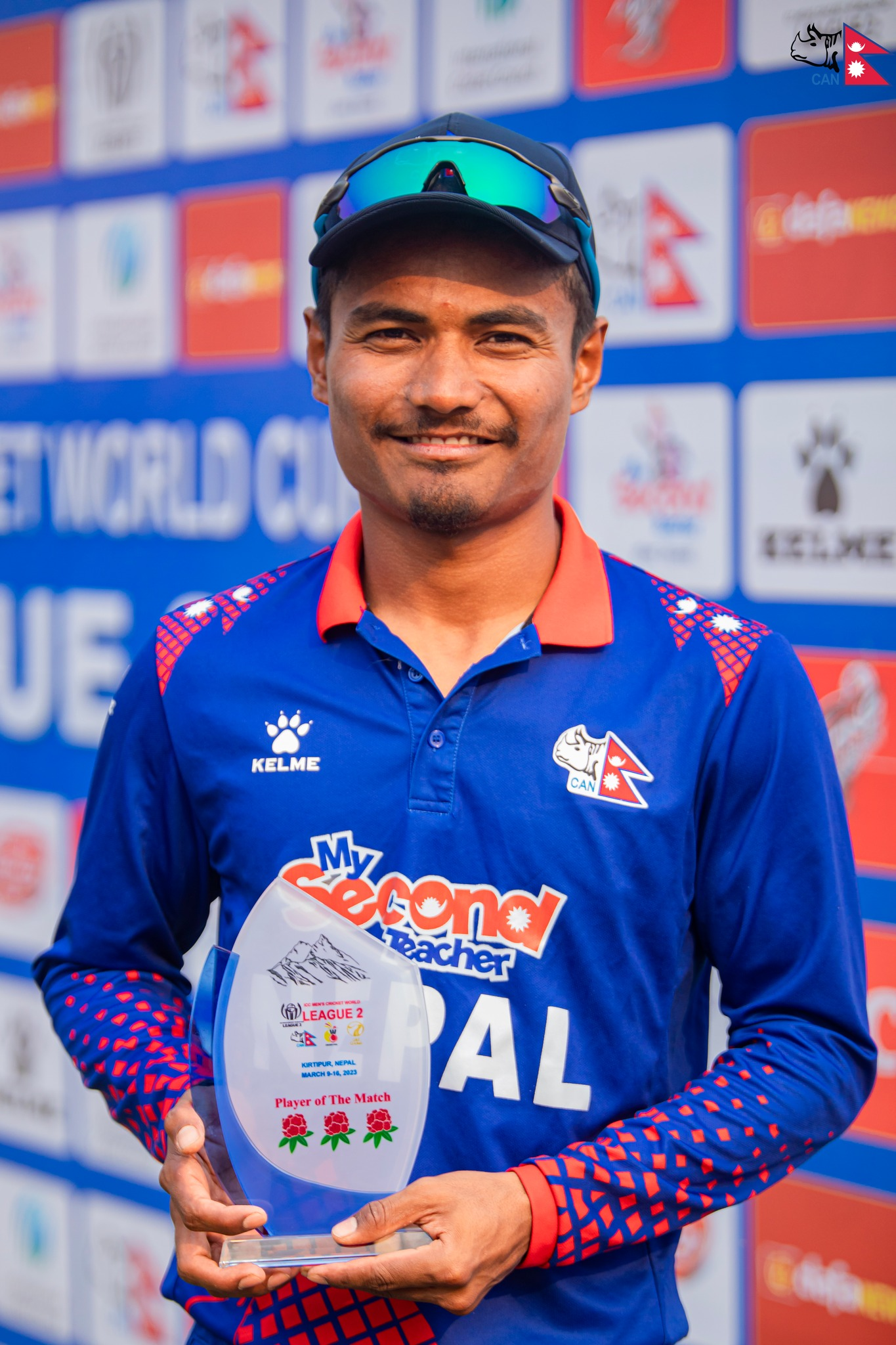
Rohit Paudel is Nepal's all time highest run-scorer in ODI cricket

This is a list of Nepal One Day International cricket records. This is record of team and individual performances in One Day International cricket. Nepal played their first ODI match against Netherlands on August 1, 2018, and these records date from that match.

== Listing criteria ==
In general, the top five are listed in each category (except when there is a tie for the last place among the five, in which case, all the tied record holders are noted).

- ♠ Represents the ODI World Record in the history of the game.

== Team records ==
=== Matches played (total) ===
Team	Matches	Won	Lost	Tied	No Result	% Won
Nepal	88	43	42	1	2	50.58%
Source: Cricinfo Last updated: 18 May 2026

=== Head-to-head records ===
Opponent	First	Matches	Won	Lost	Tied	No Result	% Won	First win
Full Members
India	4 September 2023	1	0	1	0	0	0%	
Ireland	4 July 2023	1	0	1	0	0	0%	
Pakistan	30 August 2023	1	0	1	0	0	0%	
West Indies	22 June 2023	1	0	1	0	0	0%	
Zimbabwe	18 June 2023	1	0	1	0	0	0%	
Associate Members
Canada	8 February 2024	5	3	2	0	0	60.00%	8 February 2024
Namibia	11 July 2022	8	2	5	0	1	28.57%	14 February 2023
Netherlands	1 August 2018	7	4	3	0	0	57.14%	3 August 2018
Oman	5 February 2020	10	4	6	0	0	40.00%	19 September 2021
Papua New Guinea	7 September 2021	10	8	2	0	0	80.00%	7 September 2021
Scotland	13 July 2022	12	6	5	0	1	54.54%	13 July 2022
United Arab Emirates	30 August 2018	19	11	8	0	0	57.89%	26 January 2019
United States	8 February 2020	12	5	6	1	0	45.83%	8 February 2020
Source: Cricinfo Last updated: 10 June 2024

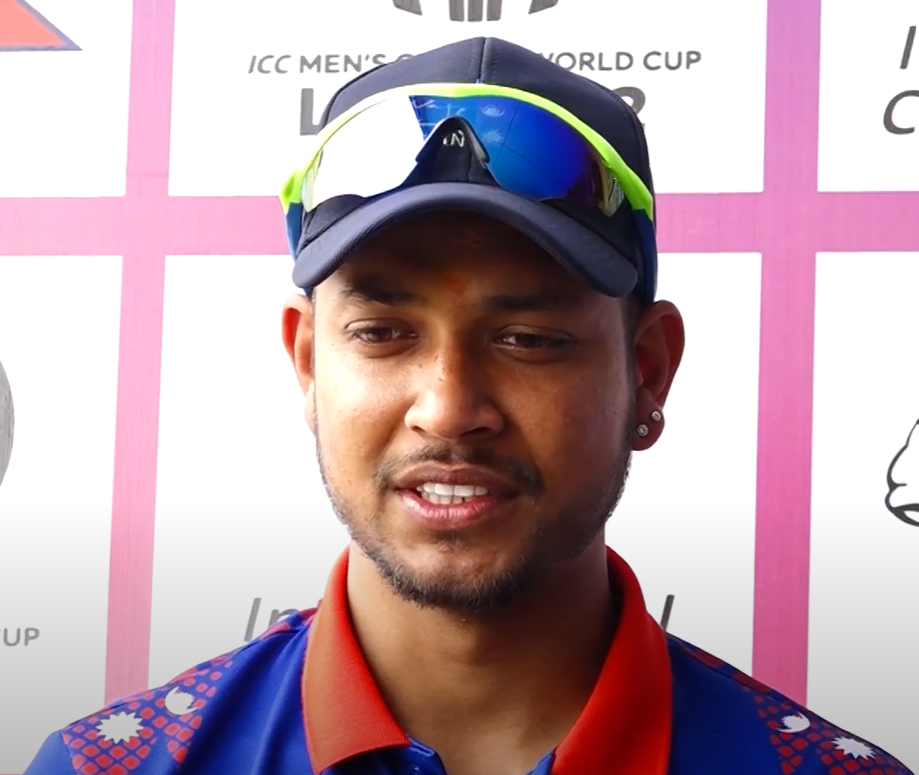
Sandeep Lamichhane is Nepal's all time highest wicket-taker in ODI cricket

=== First bilateral ODI series wins ===
Opponent	Year of first Home win	Year of first Away win
United Arab Emirates	2022–23	2018–19
Papua New Guinea	-	2021–22
Canada	2023/24	-
Last updated: 12 February 2024

=== First ODI match wins ===
Opponent	Home		Away / Neutral	
Opponent	Venue	Year	Venue	Year
Netherlands	Tribhuvan University International Cricket Ground, Kirtipur	2024	VRA Cricket Ground, Amstelveen	2018
United Arab Emirates	Tribhuvan University International Cricket Ground, Kirtipur	2022	ICC Academy Ground, Dubai	2019
United States	Tribhuvan University International Cricket Ground, Kirtipur	2020	Oman Cricket Academy Ground, Al Amarat	2021
Papua New Guinea	Tribhuvan University International Cricket Ground, Kirtipur	2023	Oman Cricket Academy Ground, Al Amarat	2021
Oman	Tribhuvan University International Cricket Ground, Kirtipur	2023	Oman Cricket Academy Ground, Al Amarat	2021
Scotland	Tribhuvan University International Cricket Ground, Kirtipur	2023	Titwood, Glasgow	2022
Namibia	Tribhuvan University International Cricket Ground, Kirtipur	2023		
Canada	Tribhuvan University International Cricket Ground, Kirtipur	2024		
Last updated: 17 February 2024

== Team scoring records ==
=== Highest innings totals ===
Rank	Score	Opponent	Venue	Date
1	321 (50 overs)	Scotland	Forthill Cricket Ground, Dundee	8 June 2025
2	310/8 (50 overs)	Oman	Tribhuvan University International Cricket Ground, Kirtipur	21 April 2023
3	297 (49.1 overs)	Papua New Guinea	Tribhuvan University International Cricket Ground, Kirtipur	9 March 2023
4	297/9 (49.5 overs)	Scotland	Forthill Cricket Ground, Dundee	2 June 2025
5	290/8 (50 overs)	Zimbabwe	Harare Sports Club, Harare	18 June 2023
Source: Cricinfo Last updated: 8 June 2025

=== Highest match aggregate ===
Rank	Score	Teams	Venue	Date
1	644/16 (100 overs)	Scotland (323/6) v Nepal (321)	Forthill Cricket Ground, Dundee	8 June 2025
2	593/16 (99.5 overs)	Scotland (296/7) v Nepal (297/9)	Forthill Cricket Ground, Dundee	2 June 2025
3	581/10 (94.1 overs)	Nepal (290/8) vs Zimbabwe (291/2)	Harare Sports Club, Harare	18 June 2023
4	579/12 (94 overs)	United Arab Emirates (310/6) v Nepal (269/6)	Tribhuvan University International Cricket Ground, Kirtipur	16 March 2023
5	578/16 (100 overs)	Papua New Guinea (292/8) v Nepal (286/8)	Tribhuvan University International Cricket Ground, Kirtipur	25 March 2022
Note: teams are shown in bowling order. Source: Cricinfo. Last updated: 8 June 2025

=== Largest successful run chases ===
Rank	Score	Opponent	Venue	Date
1	297/9	Scotland	Forthill Cricket Ground, Dundee	2 June 2025
2	287/6	Canada	Tribhuvan University International Cricket Ground, Kirtipur	10 February 2024
3	287/8	Namibia	Tribhuvan University International Cricket Ground, Kirtipur	14 February 2023
4	278/7	Namibia	Tribhuvan University International Cricket Ground, Kirtipur	18 February 2023
5	275/7	Scotland	Tribhuvan University International Cricket Ground, Kirtipur	17 February 2023
Source: Cricinfo.com. Last updated: 2 June 2025

=== Lowest innings totals ===
Rank 1	Score	Opponent	Venue	Date
1	103 (35.1 overs)	United Arab Emirates	Dubai International Cricket Stadium, Dubai	21 March 2022
2	104 (23.4 overs)	Pakistan	Multan Cricket Stadium, Multan	30 August 2023
3	113 (33.5 overs)	United Arab Emirates	ICC Academy Ground, Dubai	25 January 2019
4	119 (35.3 overs)	Scotland	United Ground, Windhoek	8 December 2022
5	120 (35.1 overs)	United Arab Emirates	Dubai International Cricket Stadium, Dubai	18 March 2022
Source: Cricinfo Last updated: 30 August 2023

=== Lowest match aggregate ===
Rank	Score	Teams	Venue	Date
1	71/12 (17.2 overs)	United States (35) v Nepal (36/2)	Tribhuvan University International Cricket Ground, Kirtipur	11 February 2020
2	195/11 (39.4 overs)	Papua New Guinea (95) v Nepal (100/1)	Tribhuvan University International Cricket Ground, Kirtipur	13 March 2023
3	229/17 (66.0 overs)	Nepal (113) v United Arab Emirates (116/7)	ICC Academy Ground, Dubai	25 January 2019
4	235/13 (63.4 overs)	United Arab Emirates (117) v Nepal (118/3)	Tribhuvan University International Cricket Ground, Kirtipur	1 May 2023
5	240/12 (52.3 overs)	Nepal (119) v Scotland (121/2)	United Ground, Windhoek	8 December 2022
Note: teams are shown in bowling order.Source: Cricinfo Last updated: 1 May 2023

=== Highest win margins (by wickets) ===
Rank	Margin	Teams	Venue	Date
1	9 wickets	Papua New Guinea	Tribhuvan University International Cricket Ground, Kirtipur	13 March 2023
1	9 wickets	Canada	Tribhuvan University International Cricket Ground, Kirtipur	12 February 2024
1	9 wickets	Netherlands	Tribhuvan University International Cricket Ground, Kirtipur	17 February 2024
1	9 wickets	United States	Tribhuvan University International Cricket Ground, Kirtipur	16 May 2026
5	8 wickets	United States	Tribhuvan University International Cricket Ground, Kirtipur	11 February 2020
Source: ESPNcricinfo Last updated: 17 February 2024

=== Highest win margins (by balls remaining) ===
Rank	Balls remaining	Target	Opponent	Venue	Date
1	268	36	United States	Tribhuvan University International Cricket Ground, Kirtipur	11 February 2020
2	254	96	Papua New Guinea	Tribhuvan University International Cricket Ground, Kirtipur	13 March 2023
3	208	138	Netherlands	Tribhuvan University International Cricket Ground, Kirtipur	17 February 2024
4	190	122	Oman	Oman Cricket Academy Ground, Al Amarat	19 September 2021
5	149	145	Scotland	Titwood, Glasgow	13 July 2022
Source: Cricinfo. Last updated: 17 February 2024

=== Highest win margins (by runs) ===
Rank	Margin	Teams	Venue	Date
1	177 runs	United Arab Emirates	Tribhuvan University Cricket Ground, Kirtipur	12 March 2023
2	151 runs	Papua New Guinea	Al Amerat Cricket Stadium, Al Amarat	10 September 2021
3	145 runs	United Arab Emirates	ICC Academy Ground, Dubai	26 January 2019
4	84 runs	Oman	Tribhuvan University Cricket Ground, Kirtipur	21 April 2023
5	81 runs	United Arab Emirates	Tribhuvan University Cricket Ground, Kirtipur	5 May 2026
Source: ESPNcricinfo Last updated: 5 May 2026

=== Lowest win margins (by wickets) ===
Margin	Teams	Venue	Date
1 wicket	Scotland	Forthill Cricket Ground, Dundee	2 June 2025
2 wickets	Papua New Guinea	Oman Cricket Academy Ground, Al Amarat	7 September 2021
2 wickets	Papua New Guinea	Sharjah Cricket Stadium, Sharjah	16 March 2022
2 wickets	Namibia	Tribhuvan University International Cricket Ground, Kirtipur	14 February 2023
2 wickets	Scotland	Tribhuvan University International Cricket Ground, Kirtipur	21 February 2023
Qualification: win margin of 2 or less wickets. Source: Cricinfo. Last updated: 2 June 2025

=== Lowest win margins (by balls remaining) ===
Rank	Balls remaining	Target	Opponent	Venue	Date
1	1	297	Scotland	Forthill Cricket Ground, Dundee	2 June 2025
2	4	205	Papua New Guinea	Sharjah Cricket Stadium, Sharjah	16 March 2022
3	6	231	United States	Oman Cricket Academy Ground, Al Amarat	13 September 2021
4	12	180	Papua New Guinea	Dubai International Cricket Stadium, Dubai	3 March 2023
5	13	192	United Arab Emirates	Tribhuvan University International Cricket Ground, Kirtipur	16 November 2022
Source: Cricinfo. Last updated: 2 June 2025

=== Lowest win margins (by runs) ===
Rank	Margin	Teams	Venue	Date
1	1 runs	Netherlands	VRA Cricket Ground, Amstelveen	3 August 2018
2	6 runs	United Arab Emirates	Tribhuvan University International Cricket Ground, Kirtipur	1 May 2026
3	7 runs	Canada	Tribhuvan University International Cricket Ground, Kirtipur	8 February 2024
4	9 runs	United Arab Emirates	Tribhuvan University International Cricket Ground, Kirtipur	16 March 2023
5	16 runs	Netherlands	Forthill Cricket Ground, Dundee	10 June 2025
Source: ESPNcricinfo Last updated: 1 May 2026

=== Tied matches ===
A tie can occur when the scores of both teams are equal at the conclusion of play, provided that the side batting last has completed their innings.

Opposition	Venue	Date	ODI#
United States	Moosa Stadium, Pearland, Texas	11 June 2022	4406
Last updated: 14 February 2024

== Individual records (batting) ==
=== Most career runs ===
Rank	Runs	Player	Matches	Innings	Average	Period
1	2,518	Rohit Paudel	92	87	31.08	2018–2026
2	2,182	Aasif Sheikh	78	78	29.89	2021–2026
3	1,782	Dipendra Singh Airee	84	79	24.75	2018–2026
4	1,701	Kushal Bhurtel	74	73	23.95	2021–2026
5	1,604	Aarif Sheikh	77	67	27.65	2018–2026
Source: Cricinfo Last updated: 14 October 2026

=== Fastest runs getter ===
Runs	Batsman	Match	Innings	Record Date	ODI#
1,000	Aasif Sheikh	32	32	9 March 2023	4532
2,000	Rohit Paudel	76	72	5 November 2025	4925
Source: Cricinfo Last updated: 19 May 2026

=== Most runs in each batting position ===
Batting position	Batsman	Innings	Runs	Average	Period	Ref
Opener	Aasif Sheikh	68	1,898	30.12	2021–2026	
Number 3	Gyanendra Malla	24	602	26.14	2021–2023	
Number 4	Rohit Paudel	63	1,744	31.14	2021–2026	
Number 5	Aarif Sheikh	21	573	27.28	2018–2026	
Number 6	Dipendra Singh Airee	22	591	29.55	2022–2026	
Number 7	Dipendra Singh Airee	16	349	24.92	2022–2024	
Number 8	Sompal Kami	20	384	27.42	2018–2025	
Number 9	Karan KC	18	225	16.61	2018–2026	
Number 10	Karan KC	15	218	19.81	2022–2026	
Number 11	Sandeep Lamichhane	5	28	9.33	2018–2026	
Last updated: 19 May 2026

=== Most runs against each team ===
Opposition	Runs	Batsman	Matches	Innings	Average	Ref
Canada	163	Anil Sah	3	3	81.50	
Canada	163	Bhim Sarki	5	5	40.75	
India	58	Aasif Sheikh	1	1	58.00	
Ireland	57	Gulsan Jha	1	1	-	
Namibia	218	Aasif Sheikh	8	8	27.25	
Netherlands	206	Aarif Sheikh	6	6	34.33	
Oman	316	Aasif Sheikh	7	7	45.14	
Pakistan	28	Sompal Kami	1	1	28.00	
Papua New Guinea	443	Rohit Paudel	10	9	55.37	
Scotland	356	Rohit Paudel	12	11	44.50	
West Indies	63	Aarif Sheikh	1	1	63.00	
United Arab Emirates	496	Dipendra Singh Airee	18	18	31.00	
United States	395	Kushal Bhurtel	10	10	43.88	
Zimbabwe	99	Kushal Bhurtel	1	1	99.00	
Last updated: 10 June 2025

=== Highest individual score ===
Rank	Runs	Player	Opponent	Venue	Date
1	126	Rohit Paudel	Papua New Guinea	Tribhuvan University International Cricket Ground, Kirtipur	25 March 2022
2	120*	Kushal Bhurtel	United States	Tribhuvan University International Cricket Ground, Kirtipur	16 May 2026
3	115	Paras Khadka	United Arab Emirates	ICC Academy Ground, Dubai	28 January 2019
3	115	Kushal Bhurtel	Namibia	Tribhuvan University International Cricket Ground, Kirtipur	14 February 2023
5	112*	Anil Sah	Canada	Tribhuvan University International Cricket Ground, Kirtipur	12 February 2024
Source: ESPNcricinfo Last updated: 21 May 2026

=== Highest individual score – progression of record ===
Runs	Player	Opponent	Venue	Date
51	Gyanendra Malla	Netherlands	VRA Cricket Ground, Amstelveen	1 August 2018
61	Sompal Kami	Netherlands	VRA Cricket Ground, Amstelveen	3 August 2018
115	Paras Khadka	United Arab Emirates	ICC Academy Ground, Dubai	28 January 2019
126	Rohit Paudel	Papua New Guinea	Tribhuvan University International Cricket Ground, Kirtipur	25 March 2022
Last updated: 25 March 2022

=== Highest individual score in each batting position ===
Batting position	Batsman	Score	Opposition	Venue	Date	Ref
Opener	Kushal Bhurtel	120*	United States	Tribhuvan University International Cricket Ground, Kirtipur	16 May 2026	
Number 3	Paras Khadka	115	United Arab Emirates	ICC Academy Ground, Dubai	28 January 2019	
Number 4	Rohit Poudel	109	United Arab Emirates	ICC Academy Ground, Dubai	30 October 2025	
Number 5	Rohit Poudel	126	Papua New Guinea	Tribhuvan University International Cricket Ground, Kirtipur	25 March 2022	
Number 6	Kushal Malla	108	Oman	Tribhuvan University International Cricket Ground, Kirtipur	21 April 2023	
Number 7	Dipendra Singh Airee	85*	Scotland	Tribhuvan University International Cricket Ground, Kirtipur	17 February 2023	
Number 8	Sompal Kami	67	Scotland	Forthill Cricket Ground, Dundee	8 June 2025	
Number 9	Karan KC	65*	Scotland	Forthill Cricket Ground, Dundee	2 June 2025	
Number 10	Karan KC	31*	Scotland	Tribhuvan University International Cricket Ground, Kirtipur	21 February 2023	
Number 11	Sandeep Lamichhane	26*	United Arab Emirates	Dubai International Cricket Stadium, Dubai	2 March 2023	
Last Updated: 21 May 2026

=== Most career centuries ===
As of now, 8 players have scored at least a maiden century for Nepal in ODI cricket.

Centuries	Player	Innings
3	Rohit Paudel	87
2
2	Kushal Bhurtel	73
2	Aasif Sheikh	78
2	Dipendra Singh Airee	79
1
1	Paras Khadka	10
1	Anil Sah	17
1	Kushal Malla	36
1	Bhim Sharki	38
Source: Cricinfo. Last updated: 11 October 2026

=== Most career half-centuries ===
Rank	50s	Player	Innings	Period
1	17	Aasif Sheikh	78	2021–2026
2	16	Rohit Paudel	87	2018–2026
5	12	Dipendra Singh Airee	79	2018–2026
3	11	Kushal Bhurtel	73	2021–2026
4	9	Aarif Sheikh	60	2018–2026
Source: Cricinfo Last updated: 13 October 2026

=== Highest career average ===
Rank	Average	Player	Runs	Matches	Innings	Not Out	Period
1	33.15	Bhim Sharki	862	32	29	3	2022–2025
2	29.91	Gulsan Jha	718	37	31	7	2021–2025
3	29.38	Rohit Paudel	1,851	68	68	5	2018–2025
4	29.05	Aasif Sheikh	1,569	59	59	5	2021–2025
5	28.82	Gulsan Jha	1,326	61	52	6	2018–2025
Source: ESPNcricinfo Last updated: 10 June 2025, Qualification: 20 innings

=== Highest career strike rate ===
Rank	Strike rate	Player	Innings	Runs	Balls faced	Period
1	90.83	Karan KC	44	565	622	2018–2025
2	89.61	Kushal Malla	35	768	857	2020–2024
3	85.12	Sandeep Lamichhane	43	475	558	2018–2025
4	81.51	Kushal Bhurtel	60	1,398	1,715	2021–2025
5	78.72	Gulsan Jha	37	718	912	2021–2025
Source: ESPNcricinfo Last updated: 10 June 2025, Qualification: 500 balls faced

=== Most career sixes ===
Rank	Sixes	Player	Innings	Period
1	46	Kushal Malla	36	2020–2025
2	42	Gulsan Jha	38	2021–2026
3	41	Rohit Paudel	78	2018–2026
4	34	Kushal Bhurtel	68	2021–2026
5	34	Karan KC	51	2018–2026
Source: Cricinfo. Last updated: 21 May 2026

=== Most career Fours ===
Rank	Fours	Player	Innings	Period
1	220	Aasif Sheikh	69	2021–2026
2	178	Kushal Bhurtel	68	2021–2026
3	158	Rohit Paudel	78	2018–2026
4	124	Dipendra Singh Airee	70	2018–2026
5	102	Aarif Sheikh	62	2018–2026
Source: Cricinfo. Last updated: 21 May 2026

=== Most Ducks ===
Rank	Ducks	Player	Innings	Period
1	8	Dipendra Singh Airee	56	2018–2024
2	7	Sandeep Lamichhane	40	2018–2024
2	7	Kushal Bhurtel	56	2021–2024
4	5	Aasif Sheikh	56	2021–2024
4	5	Rohit Paudel	64	2018–2024
Source: ESPNcricinfo Last updated: 4 November 2024

=== Most Runs in a Series ===
Rank	Runs	Player	Innings	Average	H.S.	Series
1	934	Aasif Sheikh	30	33.35	110	2019–23 ICC Cricket World Cup League 2
2	909	Rohit Paudel	32	33.66	95*	2019–23 ICC Cricket World Cup League 2
3	681	Kushal Bhurtel	29	23.48	115	2019–23 ICC Cricket World Cup League 2
4	595	Aarif Sheikh	25	27.04	66	2019–23 ICC Cricket World Cup League 2
5	572	Gyanendra Malla	24	24.86	75	2019–23 ICC Cricket World Cup League 2
Source: Cricinfo. Last updated: 16 March 2023

== Individual records (bowling) ==
=== Most career wickets ===
Rank	Wickets	Innings	Player	BBI	Period
1	154	72	Sandeep Lamichhane	6/11	2018–2026
2	98	69	Karan KC	5/33	2018–2026
3	97	71	Sompal Kami	5/33	2018–2026
4	54	43	Lalit Rajbanshi	5/20	2019–2026
5	53	68	Dipendra Singh Airee	4/24	2018–2026
BBI – Best Bowling Innings; Source: ESPNcricinfo Last updated: 8 June 2026

=== Fastest wicket taker ===
Sandeep Lamichhane is the second-fastest to 50 wickets and fastest to 100 wickets in ODI cricket overall.

Wickets	Bowler	Matches	Record Date	Ref
50	Sandeep Lamichhane	22	26 March 2022	
100	Sandeep Lamichhane	42 ♠	21 April 2023	
Last updated: 21 April 2023

=== Most career wickets against each team ===
Opposition	Wickets	Player	Matches	Innings	Average	Ref
Canada	7	Rohit Paudel	5	3	13.85	
India	0	N/A	1	1	-	
Ireland	4	Karan KC	1	1	14.50	
Namibia	14	Sandeep Lamichhane	4	4	13.92	
Netherlands	11	Sandeep Lamichhane	5	5	20.90	
Oman	25	Karan KC	8	8	13.12	
Pakistan	2	Sompal Kami	1	1	42.50	
Papua New Guinea	25	Sandeep Lamichhane	9	9	12.60	
Scotland	14	Sandeep Lamichhane	8	7	21.85	
West Indies	3	Lalit Rajbanshi	1	1	17.33	
United Arab Emirates	27	Sandeep Lamichhane	12	12	15.96	
United States	17	Sandeep Lamichhane	9	9	21.23	
Zimbabwe	1	Sompal Kami	1	1	30.00	
Zimbabwe	1	Gulsan Jha	1	1	56.00	
Last updated: 10 June 2025

=== Best Bowling figures in an innings ===
Rank	Bowling	Player	Opponent	Venue	Date
1	6/11	Sandeep Lamichhane	Papua New Guinea	Oman Cricket Academy Ground, Al Amarat	10 September 2021
2	6/16	Sandeep Lamichhane	United States	Tribhuvan University International Cricket Ground, Kirtipur	11 February 2020
3	5/20	Lalit Rajbanshi	United Arab Emirates	Tribhuvan University International Cricket Ground, Kirtipur	12 March 2023
4	5/25	Sandeep Lamichhane	Papua New Guinea	Tribhuvan University International Cricket Ground, Kirtipur	13 March 2023
5	5/33	Sompal Kami	United Arab Emirates	ICC Academy Ground, Dubai	26 January 2019
Source: ESPNcricinfo Last updated: 13 March 2023

=== Best figures in an innings – progression of record ===
Figures	Player	Opposition	Venue	Date
4/26	Paras Khadka	Netherlands	VRA Cricket Ground, Amstelveen	1 August 2018
4/24	Sandeep Lamichhane	United Arab Emirates	Kinrara Academy Oval, Kuala Lumpur	3 August 2018
5/33	Sompal Kami	United Arab Emirates	ICC Academy Ground, Dubai	26 January 2019
6/16	Sandeep Lamichhane	United States	Tribhuvan University International Cricket Ground, Kirtipur	12 February 2020
6/11	Sandeep Lamichhane	Papua New Guinea	Oman Cricket Academy Ground, Al Amarat	10 September 2021
Source: ESPNcricinfo Last updated: 10 September 2021

=== Hat-tricks ===
None

=== Best Bowling Figure against each team ===
Opposition	Figures	Player	Venue	Date	Ref
Canada	4/22	Rohit Paudel	Tribhuvan University International Cricket Ground, Kirtipur	8 February 2024	
India	0/11	Gulsan Jha	Pallekele International Cricket Stadium, Pallekele	4 September 2023	
India	0/11	Kushal Malla	Pallekele International Cricket Stadium, Pallekele	4 September 2023	
Ireland	4/58	Karan KC	Harare Sports Club, Harare	4 July 2023	
Namibia	5/61	Karan KC	Tribhuvan University International Cricket Ground, Kirtipur	14 February 2023	
Netherlands	4/20	Kushal Bhurtel	Tribhuvan University International Cricket Ground, Kirtipur	17 February 2024	
Oman	5/33	Karan KC	Moosa Stadium, Pearland	14 June 2022	
Pakistan	2/85	Sompal Kami	Multan Cricket Stadium, Multan	30 August 2023	
Papua New Guinea	6/11	Sandeep Lamichhane	Oman Cricket Academy Ground, Al Amarat	10 September 2021	
Scotland	4/45	Sandeep Lamichhane	Tribhuvan University International Cricket Ground, Kirtipur	21 February 2023	
West Indies	3/52	Lalit Rajbanshi	Harare Sports Club, Harare	22 June 2023	
United Arab Emirates	5/20	Lalit Rajbanshi	Tribhuvan University International Cricket Ground, Kirtipur	12 March 2023	
United States	6/16	Sandeep Lamichhane	Tribhuvan University International Cricket Ground, Kirtipur	12 February 2020	
Zimbabwe	1/30	Sompal Kami	Harare Sports Club, Harare	18 June 2023	
Last updated: 17 February 2024

=== Best career averages ===
Rank	Average	Player	Matches	Wickets	Runs	Period
1	19.78	Sandeep Lamichhane	62	127	2,513	2018–2025
2	26.33	Karan KC	61	86	2,265	2018–2025
3	29.42	Sompal Kami	64	84	2,472	2018–2025
4	35.47	Dipendra Singh Airee	64	40	1,419	2018–2025
Qualification: 2000 balls bowled. Source: Cricinfo. Last updated: 10 June 2025

=== Best career economy rate ===
Rank	Economy rate	Player	Matches	Overs	Runs	Period
1	4.02	Dipendra Singh Airee	64	352.2	1,419	2018–2025
2	4.48	Sandeep Lamichhane	62	560.2	2,513	2018–2025
3	5.15	Karan KC	61	439.2	2,265	2018–2025
4	5.22	Sompal Kami	64	472.5	2,472	2018–2025
Qualification: 2000 balls bowled. Source: Cricinfo. Last updated: 10 June 2025

=== Best career strike rate ===
Rank	Strike rate	Player	Matches	Wickets	Overs	Period
1	26.47	Sandeep Lamichhane	62	127	560.2	2018–2025
2	30.65	Karan KC	61	86	439.2	2018–2025
3	33.77	Sompal Kami	64	84	472.5	2018–2025
4	52.85	Dipendra Singh Airee	64	40	352.2	2018–2025
Qualification: 2000 balls bowled. Source: Cricinfo. Last updated: 10 June 2025

=== Most Four (& over) wickets in an innings ===
Rank	Four-wicket hauls	Player	Innings	Period
1	11	Sandeep Lamichhane	56	2018–2024
2	8	Karan KC	57	2018–2024
3	3	Lalit Rajbanshi	29	2019–2024
4	2	Kushal Bhurtel	16	2021–2024
4	2	Sompal Kami	60	2018–2024
Source: Cricinfo. Last updated: 4 November 2024

=== Most five-wicket hauls in an innings ===
Rank	Five-wicket hauls	Player	Innings	Period
1	3	Sandeep Lamichhane	56	2018–2024
1	3	Karan KC	57	2018–2024
2	1	Lalit Rajbanshi	29	2019–2024
2	1	Gulsan Jha	31	2021–2024
2	1	Sompal Kami	60	2018–2024
Source: Cricinfo. Last updated: 4 November 2024

=== Most runs conceded in an innings ===
Rank	Runs	Player	Overs	Opponent	Date
1	87	Gulsan Jha	10.0	United States	2 November 2024
2	85	Sompal Kami	10.0	Pakistan	30 August 2023
3	81	Sompal Kami	9.0	Papua New Guinea	25 March 2022
3	81	Karan KC	10.0	West Indies	22 June 2023
5	80	Sandeep Lamichhane	10.0	United Arab Emirates	16 March 2023
Source: Cricinfo. Last updated: 2 November 2024

=== Most wickets in a series ===
Rank	Wickets	Player	Innings	BBI	Series
1	72	Sandeep Lamichhane	30	6/16	2019–23 Cricket World Cup League 2
2	50	Karan KC	30	5/33	2019–23 Cricket World Cup League 2
3	36	Sompal Kami	31	4/39	2019–23 Cricket World Cup League 2
4	23	Dipendra Singh Airee	29	3/18	2019–23 Cricket World Cup League 2
5	17	Sompal Kami	12	3/32	2024–26 Cricket World Cup League 2
Source: Cricinfo. Last updated: 10 June 2025

== Individual records (fielding) ==
This list does not include catches taken by wicketkeeper.

=== Most catches in career ===
Rank	Catches	Player	Matches	Period
1	42	Kushal Bhurtel	61	2021–2025
2	32	Dipendra Singh Airee	64	2018–2025
3	29	Aarif Sheikh	61	2018–2025
4	23	Rohit Paudel	71	2018–2025
5	15	Sompal Kami	63	2018–2025
Source: Cricinfo. Last updated: 10 June 2025

=== Most catches in an innings ===
Rank	Catches	Player	Opponent	Date
1	4	Kushal Bhurtel	Scotland	13 July 2022
2	3	Paras Khadka	United States	11 February 2020
2	3	Kushal Bhurtel	United States	13 September 2021
2	3	Aasif Sheikh	Oman	14 September 2021
2	3	Dipendra Singh Airee	United Arab Emirates	6 March 2023
2	3	Aarif Sheikh	Papua New Guinea	9 March 2023
2	3	Kushal Bhurtel	United Arab Emirates	12 March 2023
2	3	Lalit Rajbanshi	Papua New Guinea	13 March 2023
2	3	Aarif Sheikh	United Arab Emirates	1 May 2023
2	3	Aarif Sheikh	United States	20 June 2023
Source: Cricinfo. Last updated: 20 June 2023

=== Most catches in a series ===
Rank	Catches	Player	Innings	Series
1	19	Kushal Bhurtel	29	2019–23 ICC Cricket World Cup League 2
2	17	Dipendra Singh Airee	32	2019–23 ICC Cricket World Cup League 2
3	9	Gyanendra Malla	24	2019–23 ICC Cricket World Cup League 2
4	7	Aarif Sheikh	29	2019–23 ICC Cricket World Cup League 2
4	7	Sompal Kami	31	2019–23 ICC Cricket World Cup League 2
4	7	Sandeep Lamichhane	31	2019–23 ICC Cricket World Cup League 2
4	7	Rohit Paudel	33	2019–23 ICC Cricket World Cup League 2
Source: Cricinfo. Last updated: 16 March 2023

== Individual records (wicketkeeping) ==
=== Most dismissals in career ===
Rank	Dismissals	Player	Innings	Catches	Stumpings	Period
1	38	Aasif Sheikh	42	33	5	2021–2025
2	22	Binod Bhandari	17	21	1	2019–2022
3	10	Arjun Saud	11	8	2	2022–2024
4	3	Anil Sah	5	3	0	2018–2025
5	1	Subash Khakurel	2	0	1	2018–2022
Innings refers to the number of innings as a wicket-keeper. Source:ESPNcricinfo Last updated: 10 June 2025

=== Most career catches as keeper ===
Rank	Catches	Player	Innings	Period
1	33	Aasif Sheikh	42	2021–2025
2	21	Binod Bhandari	17	2019–2022
3	8	Arjun Saud	11	2022–2024
4	3	Anil Sah	5	2018–2025
Innings refers to the number of innings as a wicket-keeper. Source:ESPNcricinfo Last updated: 10 June 2025

=== Most career stumpings as keeper ===
Rank	Stumpings	Player	Innings	Period
1	5	Aasif Sheikh	39	2021–2024
2	2	Arjun Saud	11	2022–2024
3	1	Binod Bhandari	17	2019–2022
3	1	Subash Khakurel	2	2018–2022
Innings refers to the number of innings as a wicket-keeper. Source:ESPNcricinfo Last updated: 4 November 2024

=== Most dismissals in an innings ===
Rank	Dismissals	Wicket-Keeper	Catches	Stumpings	Opposition	Venue	Date
1	4	Binod Bhandari	4	0	United States	Tribhuvan University International Cricket Ground, Kirtipur	8 February 2020
1	4	Aasif Sheikh	3	1	United Arab Emirates	Dubai International Cricket Stadium, Dubai	18 March 2022
3	3	Binod Bhandari	3	0	United Arab Emirates	ICC Academy Ground, Dubai	25 January 2019
3	3	Binod Bhandari	3	0	United Arab Emirates	ICC Academy Ground, Dubai	28 January 2019
3	3	Binod Bhandari	2	1	Oman	Tribhuvan University International Cricket Ground, Kirtipur	5 February 2020
3	3	Binod Bhandari	3	0	Papua New Guinea	Dubai International Cricket Stadium, Dubai	22 March 2022
3	3	Aasif Sheikh	3	0	United Arab Emirates	Tribhuvan University International Cricket Ground, Kirtipur	18 November 2022
3	3	Arjun Saud	1	2	Scotland	United Ground, Windhoek	4 December 2022
3	3	Arjun Saud	3	0	United Arab Emirates	Takashinga Cricket Club, Harare	2 July 2023
3	3	Aasif Sheikh	2	1	Canada	Tribhuvan University International Cricket Ground, Kirtipur	10 February 2024
Innings refers to the number of innings as a wicket-keeper. Source:ESPNcricinfo Last updated: 15 February 2024

=== Most dismissals in a series ===
Rank	Dismissals	Wicket-Keeper	Innings	Catches	Stumpings	Series
1	15	Binod Bhandari	13	14	1	2019–23 ICC Cricket World Cup League 2
1	15	Aasif Sheikh	19	12	3	2019–23 ICC Cricket World Cup League 2
3	10	Aasif Sheikh	11	10	1	2024–2026 Cricket World Cup League 2
4	6	Binod Bhandari	3	6	0	Nepal in the UAE in 2018–19
5	4	Arjun Saud	4	2	2	2019–23 ICC Cricket World Cup League 2
Note: Innings refers to the number of innings as a wicket-keeper. Source:ESPNcricinfo Last updated: 8 June 2025

== Individual records (other) ==
=== Most matches played in career ===
Rank	Matches	Player	ODI Career Span
1	72	Rohit Paudel	2018–2025
2	64	Sompal Kami	2018–2025
2	64	Dipendra Singh Airee	2018–2025
4	62	Sandeep Lamichhane	2018–2025
5	61	Aarif Sheikh	2018–2025
5	61	Kushal Bhurtel	2021–2025
5	61	Karan KC	2018–2025
Source: Cricinfo. Last updated: 10 June 2025

=== Most matches played as captain ===
Rank	Matches	Player	Won	Lost	Tied	No Result	Win Percentage	Captaincy Period
1	55	Rohit Paudel	28	25	0	2	50.9%	2022–2026
2	14	Sandeep Lamichhane	4	9	1	0	28.57%	2022
3	10	Gyanendra Malla	6	4	0	0	60.00%	2020–2021
4	6	Paras Khadka	3	3	0	0	50.00%	2018–2019
Source: Cricinfo. Last updated: 5 May 2026

=== Most matches won as captain ===
Rank	Player	Match	Won	Lost	Tied	No Result	Win–loss Ratio	Captaincy Period
1	Rohit Paudel	55	28	25	0	2	1.12	2022–2026
2	Gyanendra Malla	10	6	4	0	0	1.50	2020–2021
3	Sandeep Lamichhane	14	4	9	1	0	0.44	2022
4	Paras Khadka	6	3	3	0	0	1.00	2018–2019
Source: Cricinfo. Last updated: 5 May 2026

== Partnership Records ==
=== Highest partnerships (by runs) ===
Rank	Runs	Wicket	Players	Opponent	Venue	Date
1	189*	2nd	Anil Sah & Bhim Sharki	Canada	Tribhuvan University International Cricket Ground, Kirtipur	12 February 2024
2	171	1st	Aasif Sheikh & Kushal Bhurtel	Zimbabwe	Harare Sports Club, Harare	18 June 2023
3	150	3rd	Rohit Paudel & Dev Khanal	Canada	Tribhuvan University International Cricket Ground, Kirtipur	10 February 2024
4	139	2nd	Aasif Sheikh & Gyanendra Malla†	Namibia	Tribhuvan University International Cricket Ground, Kirtipur	18 February 2023
5	133	3rd	Kushal Bhurtel & Rohit Paudel	Namibia	Tribhuvan University International Cricket Ground, Kirtipur	14 February 2023
Source: ESPNcricinfo Last updated: 12 February 2024

Note: An asterisk (*) signifies an unbroken partnership (i.e. neither of the batsmen were dismissed before either the end of the allotted overs or they reached the required score).

=== Highest partnerships (by wicket) ===
Partnership	Runs	Players	Opponent	Venue	Date
1st wicket	171	Kushal Bhurtel & Aasif Sheikh	Zimbabwe	Harare Sports Club, Harare	18 June 2023
2nd wicket	189*	Anil Sah & Bhim Sharki	Canada	Tribhuvan University International Cricket Ground, Kirtipur	12 February 2024
3rd wicket	150	Rohit Paudel & Dev Khanal	Canada	Tribhuvan University International Cricket Ground, Kirtipur	10 February 2024
4th wicket	96*	Bhim Sharki & Gulsan Jha	United Arab Emirates	Tribhuvan University International Cricket Ground, Kirtipur	1 May 2023
5th wicket	104	Rohit Paudel & Aarif Sheikh	Papua New Guinea	Tribhuvan University International Cricket Ground, Kirtipur	25 March 2022
6th wicket	106	Aarif Sheikh & Sompal Kami	United States	Moosa Stadium, Pearland	15 June 2022
7th wicket	105	Sompal Kami & Dipendra Singh Airee	Scotland	Forthill Cricket Ground, Dundee	8 June 2025
8th wicket	80	Sandeep Lamichhane & Gulsan Jha	Ireland	Takashinga Cricket Club, Harare	4 July 2023
9th wicket	75*	Rohit Paudel & Karan KC	Scotland	Tribhuvan University International Cricket Ground, Kirtipur	21 February 2023
10th wicket	32	Karan KC & Sandeep Lamichhane	United Arab Emirates	Dubai International Cricket Stadium, Dubai	2 March 2023
Source: ESPNcricinfo Last updated: 8 June 2025

- Note: An asterisk (*) signifies an unbroken partnership (i.e. neither of the batsmen were dismissed before either the end of the allotted overs or they reached the required score).

== See also ==
- Nepal national cricket team
- List of Nepal Twenty20 International cricketers
- List of Twenty20 International records
- Nepal women's national cricket team
- List of Nepal Twenty20 International cricket records
