= 2022 Scotland Tri-Nation Series (July) =

Cricket tournament

- Part of 2019–2023 ICC Cricket World Cup League 2
- Date: 10–17 July 2022
- Location: Scotland
Teams
Namibia	Nepal	Scotland
Captains
Gerhard Erasmus	Sandeep Lamichhane	Richie Berrington
Most runs
Jan Nicol Loftie-Eaton (145)	Aasif Sheikh (159)	Calum MacLeod (186)
Most wickets
Bernard Scholtz (7)	Sandeep Lamichhane (11)	Gavin Main (9); Hamza Tahir (9)

The 2022 Scotland Tri-Nation Series was the 14th round of the 2019–2023 ICC Cricket World Cup League 2 cricket tournament that took place in Scotland in July 2022. It was a tri-nation series between Namibia, Nepal and the Scotland cricket teams, with the matches played as One Day International (ODI) fixtures. The ICC Cricket World Cup League 2 formed part of the qualification pathway to the 2023 Cricket World Cup.

After being originally scheduled to take place in Scotland in 2020, the series was rescheduled to take place in Spain in July 2021. However, in June 2021, the series was postponed by a year, after the Namibian team were unable to travel due to the COVID-19 pandemic. The rescheduled fixtures were announced in May 2022, with all the matches played at Titwood in Glasgow and the Cambusdoon New Ground in Ayr.

== Background ==
Originally the series was scheduled to take place in July 2020. Four matches were scheduled to be played in Glasgow at Titwood, the home ground of Clydesdale Cricket Club, with the other two fixtures being played at The Grange Club in Edinburgh. However, due to the COVID-19 pandemic, all cricket facilities in Scotland were closed until 1 July 2020. On 10 June 2020, the International Cricket Council (ICC) confirmed that the tournament had been postponed due to the pandemic. In December 2020, the ICC announced the rescheduled dates for the series.

After being rescheduled to take place in Scotland in July 2021, the tri-series was later moved to Spain, due to the COVID-19 pandemic. In June 2021, the Cricket Association of Nepal (CAN) named a twenty-man preliminary squad for the series. On 24 June 2021, the series was postponed to July 2022, due to restrictions imposed in Namibia arising from the COVID-19 pandemic.

== Squads ==
Namibia	Nepal	Scotland
Gerhard Erasmus (c); Pikky Ya France; Jan Frylinck; Zane Green (wk); Divan la Cock; Jan Nicol Loftie-Eaton; Lo-handre Louwrens; Tangeni Lungameni; Bernard Scholtz; Ben Shikongo; JJ Smit; Ruben Trumpelmann; David Wiese; Craig Williams	Sandeep Lamichhane (c); Rohit Paudel (vc); Basir Ahamad; Dipendra Singh Airee; Mohammad Aadil Alam; Binod Bhandari (wk); Kushal Bhurtel; Sompal Kami; Karan KC; Dev Khanal; Kishore Mahato; Pawan Sarraf; Aarif Sheikh; Aasif Sheikh (wk)	Richie Berrington (c); Matthew Cross (vc, wk); ~~Dylan Budge~~; Kyle Coetzer; Alasdair Evans; Chris Greaves; Michael Leask; Calum MacLeod; Gavin Main; Christopher McBride; George Munsey; Adrian Neill; Safyaan Sharif; ~~Chris Sole~~; Hamza Tahir; Mark Watt

On the day prior to the start of the series, Scotland named Alasdair Evans and Chris Greaves in their squad, replacing Dylan Budge and Chris Sole.

== Fixtures ==
=== 1st ODI ===
10 July 2022
11:00
Scorecard

Scotland; 258/6 (50 overs)	v	Namibia; 181 (43 overs)
George Munsey 71* (108); Gerhard Erasmus 3/56 (10 overs)		Jan Nicol Loftie-Eaton 50 (58); Safyaan Sharif 5/35 (9 overs)

Scotland won by 77 runs
Titwood, Glasgow
Umpires: David McLean (Sco) and Shiju Sam (UAE)
Player of the match: Safyaan Sharif (Sco)

- Namibia won the toss and elected to field.
- Divan la Cock (Nam) made his ODI debut.

=== 2nd ODI ===
11 July 2022
11:00
Scorecard

Namibia; 220 (47.3 overs)	v	Nepal; 180 (46.5 overs)
Jan Nicol Loftie-Eaton 60 (70); Sandeep Lamichhane 4/54 (10 overs)		Aarif Sheikh 50* (84); David Wiese 2/24 (6.5 overs)

Namibia won by 40 runs
Cambusdoon New Ground, Ayr
Umpires: Allan Haggo (Sco) and Ryan Milne (Sco)
Player of the match: Jan Nicol Loftie-Eaton (Nam)

- Namibia won the toss and elected to bat.
- Basir Ahamad (Nep) made his ODI debut.

=== 3rd ODI ===
13 July 2022
11:00
Scorecard

Scotland; 144 (42.5 overs)	v	Nepal; 146/5 (25.1 overs)
Gavin Main 64* (59); Mohammad Aadil Alam 3/31 (10 overs)		Aasif Sheikh 71 (62); Gavin Main 3/46 (8 overs)

Nepal won by 5 wickets
Titwood, Glasgow
Umpires: Allan Haggo (Sco) and Shiju Sam (UAE)
Player of the match: Aasif Sheikh (Nep)

- Nepal won the toss and elected to field.

=== 4th ODI ===
14 July 2022
11:00
Scorecard

Namibia; 215/7 (50 overs)	v	Scotland; 219/7 (48.5 overs)
Jan Frylinck 60* (48); Hamza Tahir 3/38 (10 overs); Gavin Main 3/38 (10 overs)		Calum MacLeod 59 (93); Ruben Trumpelmann 3/41 (9.5 overs)

Scotland won by 3 wickets
Titwood, Glasgow
Umpires: Ryan Milne (Sco) and Shiju Sam (UAE)
Player of the match: Chris Greaves (Sco)

- Scotland won the toss and elected to field.

=== 5th ODI ===
16 July 2022
11:00
Scorecard

Namibia; 199 (49.2 overs)	v	Nepal; 136 (37.5 overs)
Gerhard Erasmus 53 (70); Sandeep Lamichhane 4/29 (10 overs)		Dipendra Singh Airee 38 (55); Bernard Scholtz 5/22 (9.5 overs)

Namibia won by 63 runs
Cambusdoon New Ground, Ayr
Umpires: Allan Haggo (Sco) and David McLean (Sco)
Player of the match: Bernard Scholtz (Nam)

- Namibia won the toss and elected to bat.
- Bernard Scholtz (Nam) took his first five-wicket haul in ODIs.

=== 6th ODI ===
17 July 2022
11:00
Scorecard

Nepal; 128 (35.5 overs)	v	Scotland; 130/2 (19 overs)
Aasif Sheikh 40 (58); Hamza Tahir 4/26 (7.5 overs)		Calum MacLeod 64 (29); Sompal Kami 1/26 (3 overs)

Scotland won by 8 wickets
Titwood, Glasgow
Umpires: Ryan Milne (Sco) and Shiju Sam (UAE)
Player of the match: Calum MacLeod (Sco)

- Scotland won the toss and elected to field.
- Kishore Mahato (Nep) made his ODI debut.
