= Kishore Mahato =

Nepalese cricketer (born 2000)

Personal information
- Full name: Kishore Mahato
- Born: 2 April 2000 (age 26)
- Batting: Right-handed
- Bowling: Right-arm medium fast
- Role: Bowler

International information
- National side: Nepal (2022–present)
- ODI debut (cap 34): 17 July 2022 v Scotland
- Last ODI: 4 July 2023 v Ireland

Domestic team information
- Years: Team
- 2017–2019: Biratnagar Kings
- 2019–2020: Gandaki Province
- 2017–2022: Pokhara Rhinos
- 2022: Lumbini All Stars
- 2024-2025: Janakpur Bolts
- 2026-present: Lumbini Lions

Career statistics
Competition	ODI	LA
Matches	2	5
Runs scored	1	3
Batting average	–	–
100s/50s	0/0	0/0
Top score	1*	2*
Balls bowled	78	156
Wickets	2	7
Bowling average	38.00	23.57
5 wickets in innings	0	1
10 wickets in match	0	0
Best bowling	2/55	5/43
Catches/stumpings	0/–	0/–
- Source: Cricinfo, 21 April 2024

Kishore Mahato (Nepali: किशोर महतो, born 2 April 2000) is a Nepalese cricketer who plays for Nepal as a medium fast bowler. He has played in different leagues including Nepal T20 League, EPL for different teams like Biratnagar Kings, Pokhara Rhinos, Armed Police Force, Kathmandu Golden, Gandaki Province and Lumbini All Stars. He also played for Greenvale Kangaroos in Victorian Premier League.

He made his List A debut for Nepal against Zimbabwe A on 9 May 2022. In July 2023, he was named in the Nepal's emerging squad for the 2023 ACC Emerging Teams Asia Cup.

== International career ==
In June 2022, Mahato was name in Nepal's One Day International (ODI) squad for the round fourteen of 2019–2023 ICC Cricket World Cup League 2 tournament, in Scotland. He made his ODI debut on 17 July 2022, for Nepal against Scotland.

In May 2023, he was named in Nepal's squad for 2023 Cricket World Cup Qualifier in Zimbabwe. He took 2 wickets with an average of 27.50 in the play-offs against Ireland in that tournament.
