= Ravi Inder Singh (cricketer) =

Indian cricketer (born 1987)

Personal information
- Full name: Ravi Inder Singh Mehra
- Born: 4 November 1987 (age 39); Patiala, Punjab, India
- Batting: Left-handed
- Bowling: Right-arm offbreak
- Role: Opening batsman

Domestic team information
- Years: Team
- 2007/08–present: Punjab

Career statistics
Competition	FC	LA	T20
Matches	44	36	20
Runs scored	2378	1431	540
Batting average	32.13	47.70	28.42
100s/50s	6/10	3/10	0/5
Top score	142	126*	69*
Balls bowled	669	137	–
Wickets	3	4	–
Bowling average	116.66	20.75	–
5 wickets in innings	0	0	–
10 wickets in match	0	0	–
Best bowling	1/0	3/38	–
Catches/stumpings	37/–	14/–	3/–
- Source: Cricinfo, 26 December 2013

Ravi Inder Singh Mehra (born 4 November 1987) is an Indian cricketer. He plays for Punjab in the Indian domestic cricket. He is a left-hand batsman and part-time offbreak bowler.

In 2018 he signed for Pokhara Premier League in Nepal, where he gained popularity.

Currently he plays for Bhairahawa Gladiators in the Everest Premier League. He scored 124* in 53 balls in his EPL debut. He signed with the DC Hawks in Minor League Cricket.
