= Gulshan Jha =

Nepalese cricketer

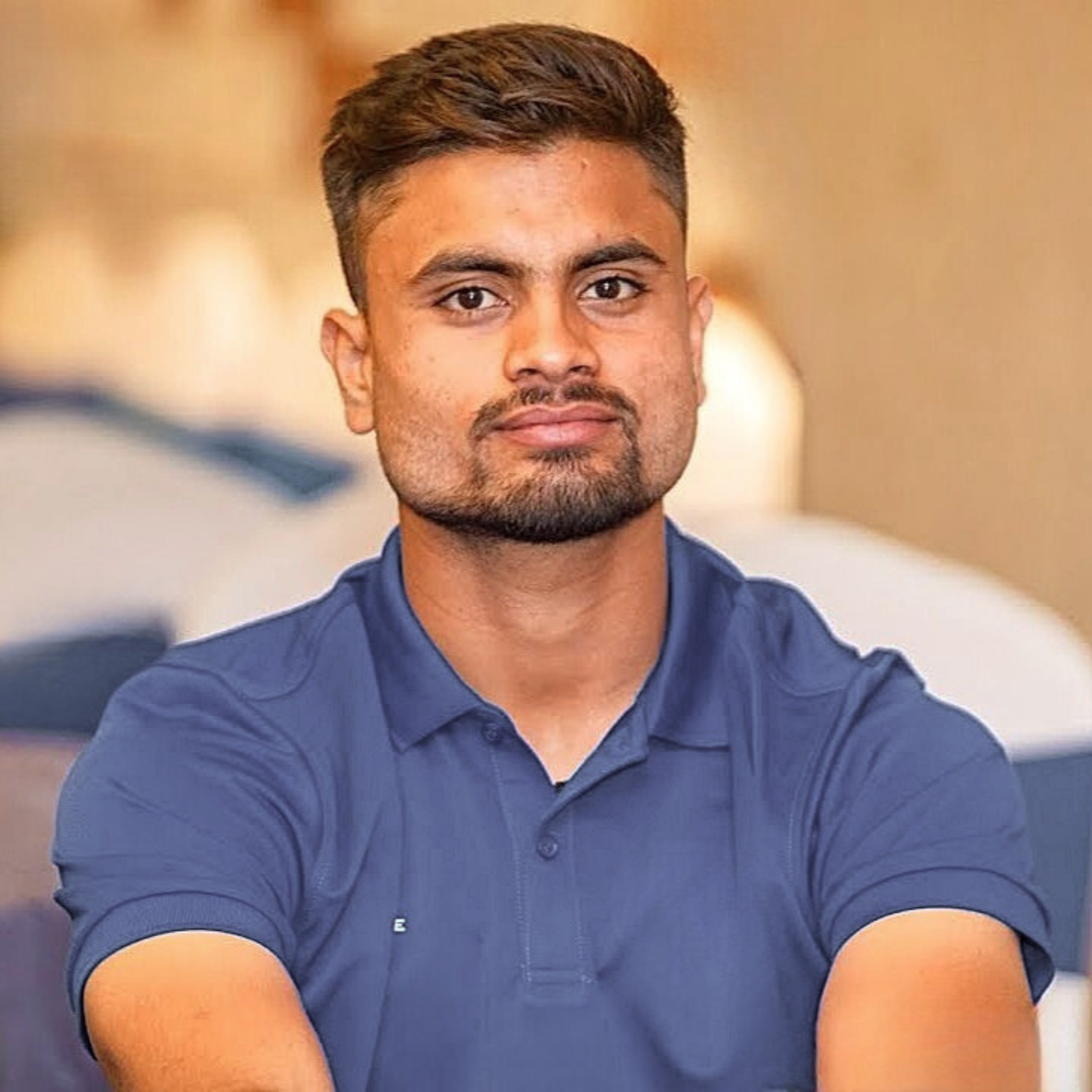

Personal information
- Full name: Gulshan Kumar Jha
- Born: 17 February 2006 (age 20); Malangwa, Sarlahi, Nepal
- Batting: Left-handed
- Bowling: Right-arm medium
- Role: All-rounder

International information
- National side: Nepal (2021–present)
- ODI debut (cap 27): 17 September 2021 v United States
- Last ODI: 1 November 2025 v United States
- ODI shirt no.: 15
- T20I debut (cap 39): 19 February 2022 v Philippines
- Last T20I: 21 April 2026 v UAE
- T20I shirt no.: 15

Domestic team information
- Years: Team
- 2020–present: Nepal Police Club
- 2021: Kathmandu Kings XI
- 2022: Lumbini All Stars
- 2024–present: Karnali Yaks
- 2026-present: JB Bruges

Career statistics
Competition	ODI	T20I	List A	T20
Matches	40	52	43	58
Runs scored	726	630	788	740
Batting average	26.88	21.00	26.26	21.14
100s/50s	0/4	0/1	0/4	0/1
Top score	67*	54	67*	54
Balls bowled	1,071	531	1,107	591
Wickets	34	29	34	31
Bowling average	32.17	22.03	33.67	23.00
5 wickets in innings	1	0	1	0
10 wickets in match	0	0	0	0
Best bowling	5/47	3/31	5/47	3/31
Catches/stumpings	11/–	17/–	13/–	18/–
- Source: ESPNcricinfo, 8 February 2026

Gulshan Kumar Jha (Nepali: गुलशन कुमार झा,Nepali pronunciation: [ɡulʃʌn kumar d͡ʒʱa]; born 17 February 2006) is a Nepalese cricketer who plays as an all-rounder for Nepal. He made his debut for Nepal in 2021 at just 15 years of age, becoming the youngest person to play for Nepal and the third-youngest One Day International cricketer of all time.

== Early life and career ==
Jha was born and raised in Sarlahi District in Nepal. In 2016, he moved to Ranchi in India and for four years was enrolled in the Arunodaya Cricket Academy, returning to Nepal in 2020 due to the COVID-19 pandemic.

Jha made his tournament debut in Nepal playing for Nepal Police Club in the Kathmandu Mayor's Cup in February 2021. He was named the player of the match in the tournament final, with bowling figures of 4/22 from his 7 overs. The match was watched by Nepal's national coach Dav Whatmore, who brought Jha into the squad for Nepal's national team.

== International career ==
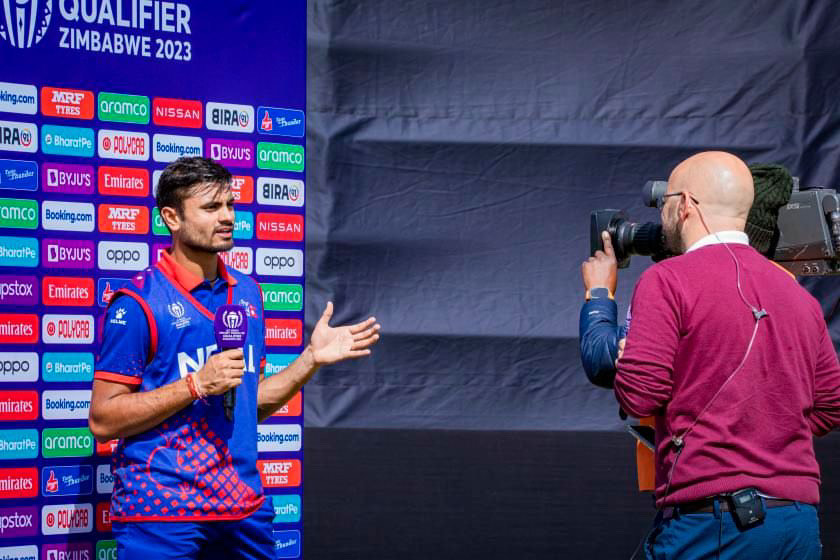
Gulshan Jha in an interview with Andrew Leonard

In August 2021, Jha was named in Nepal's One Day International (ODI) squad for their tour of Oman, including a series against Papua New Guinea and round six of the 2019–2023 ICC Cricket World Cup League 2 tournament. He did not play in the series against Papua New Guinea, but made his ODI debut on 17 September 2021 against the United States. In making his debut he became the youngest player to play ODI cricket for Nepal and the third-youngest ODI player of all time at just 15 years and 212 days.

In February 2022, he was named in Nepal's Twenty20 International (T20I) squad for the 2022 ICC Men's T20 World Cup Global Qualifier A tournament in Oman. He made his T20I debut on 19 February 2022, for Nepal against the Philippines.

In May 2023, Jha was the player of the match in the final of the 2023 ACC Men's Premier Cup against the United Arab Emirates. Having been elevated to the top order, he scored a half-century and helped Nepal to win the match and qualify for the 2023 Asia Cup. He was Nepal's best player in the 2023 Men's T20 World Cup Asia regional final, where Nepal qualified for the 2024 Men's T20 World Cup. He scored a half-century in the tournament final against Oman, with 54 runs from 25 deliveries.

Jha was part of Nepal's squad in the 2024 Men's T20 World Cup in June 2024. He was part of the team when Nepal came close to upset victory over South Africa on 14 June. Jha was the on-strike batter for the final over, and scored a four to bring Nepal within one run of South Africa's score. He attempted to run a bye off of the final ball of the match to send the match to a super over. After a throw from South African wicket-keeper Quinton de Kock deflected off of Jha's back, Jha slowed his running pace, thinking he would easily make the run. The ball deflected straight to fielder Heinrich Klaasen, who ran him out, giving South Africa a one-run victory. He received significant negative comments from fans after the loss and failure of Nepal to progress in the tournament.

Jha missed the third round of the 2024–2026 Cricket World Cup League 2 in June 2024 due to a knee injury. In September 2024, he became the first Nepal player to have a half-century and five-wicket haul in the same match, and the 24th player in ODI history to do so.

In January 2026, Jha was selected in Nepal's squad for 2026 T20I World Cup.

== Franchise cricket ==
Jha has played franchise cricket in Nepal for several teams, including the Kathmandu Kings XI in the Everest Premier League, the Lumbini All Stars in the Nepal T20 League, and the Karnali Yaks in the Nepal Premier League.
