= Kathmandu Kings XI =

Franchise cricket team in Nepal

- काठमाडौं किङ्स इलाभेन
- Nickname: The Lions
- League: Everest Premier League

Personnel
- Coach: Binod Das
- Batting coach: Kalam Ali
- Fielding coach: Vijaya Kumar Dhital
- Owner: Tele Holdings Pvt. Ltd.
- Chief executive: Raj Jung Thapa

Team information
- City: Kathmandu
- Colours: Red, blue yellow
- Founded: 2017
- Home ground: Mulpani Cricket Stadium
- Capacity: 5,000

History
- Everest Premier League wins: 0
- Notable players: Shahid Afridi; Kevin O'Brien; Dipendra Singh Airee; Ryan Burl; Rahmanullah Gurbaz; Subash Khakurel
- Official website: http://kathmandukingsxi.com/

Kathmandu Kings XI was a professional franchise cricket team based in the capital city of Nepal, Kathmandu. It was one of the major franchises in the Everest Premier League.

== Management ==
The team was owned by Rohit Gupta, as of 2017. As of 2017, Raj Jung Thapa was the chief operating officer (COO) later in 2018, Mr. Thapa was declared as the chief executive officer (CEO). The same year, the team signed Binod Das as head coach.

== Players ==
In 2017, Sompal Kami was designated the marquee player of the team, while Sri Lankan international Mohamed Ferveez Maharoof was signed additionally. It also signed two other foreign players, Akshay Fernandez of Sri Lanka and Sagar Kumar of India. Other players in the team included Sagar Pun and Amit Shrestha.

In the 2018 season, the team was captained by Sompal Kami. Its players included Siddhant Lohani, Raju Rijal, Bikram Bhusal, Rohan Mustafa, Kevin O'Brien, Jitendra Mukhiya and Pradeep Sahu. Sikandar Raza was also expected to sign, but had to withdraw at the last minute. On 26 July 2021, they announced the signing of Shahid Afridi.

== Everest Premier League ==
=== 2017 season ===
The team secured their first win of the season in third game, against Chitwan Tigers, having lost their first two matches to Lalitpur Patriots and Bhairahawa Gladiators.

=== 2018 season ===
The team reached the playoffs with a match to spare in the league stage. It was defeated by Lalitpur Patriots in the first qualifier by one wicket.
