= Chitwan Tigers =

Nepali cricket franchise

- चितवन टाइगर्स
- Nickname(s): Tigers
- League: Everest Premier League

Personnel
- Captain: Sompal Kami
- Coach: Samson Jung Thapa
- Owner: Kishore Bhattarai

Team information
- City: Chitwan
- Founded: 2017; 8 years ago
- Home ground: Gautam Buddha International Cricket Stadium
- Capacity: 10,000

History
- Everest Premier League wins: 1 (2021)
- Notable players: Sompal Kami; Lalit Bhandari; Dilip Nath; Bhim Sharki; Ishan Pandey
- Official website: http://chitwantigers.com

Chitwan Tigers (Nepali: चितवन टाइगर्स) was a professional cricket franchise based in Chitwan, Nepal, that played in the Everest Premier League. It was owned by the IDS Group Pvt Ltd. National players like Dipendra Singh Airee, Dilip Nath and Lalit Singha Bhandari, as well as internationals Paul Stirling and former U-19 captain of the England Cricket Team, Max Holden, have been part of the team. In December 2018, the franchise signed a sponsorship deal with Tensberg beer. Chitwan Tigers won their maiden title of the Everest Premier League after defeating Pokhara Rhinos by 4 wickets in 2021.
