= Sharad Vesawkar =

Nepalese cricketer

Personal information
- Born: 6 October 1988 (age 38); Dubai, United Arab Emirates
- Height: 5 ft 9 in (1.75 m)
- Batting: Right-handed
- Bowling: Right-arm off break
- Role: All-rounder

International information
- National side: Nepal (2004–2022)
- ODI debut (cap 11): 1 August 2018 v Netherlands
- Last ODI: 19 September 2021 v Oman
- T20I debut (cap 11): 16 March 2014 v Hong Kong
- Last T20I: 21 February 2022 v Canada
- T20I shirt no.: 5

Domestic team information
- Years: Team
- 2011–2013: APF (squad no. 5)
- 2015: Sudur Pashchimanchal Academy
- 2016: Panchakanya Tej
- 2017: Biratnagar Kings
- 2017-2021: Bhairahawa Gladiators
- 2018-2019: Pokhara Paltan (squad no. 5)
- 2022: Pokhara Avengers (squad no. 5)
- 2024: Chitwan Rhinos

Career statistics
Competition	ODI	T20I	LA	FC
Matches	4	20	42	5
Runs scored	66	325	1132	189
Batting average	22.0	23.2	33.3	27.0
100s/50s	0/1	0/0	0/8	0/2
Top score	55	40	89	89
Balls bowled	36	30	325	84
Wickets	2	0	10	2
Bowling average	10.5	–	27.1	20.0
5 wickets in innings	0	–	0	0
10 wickets in match	0	–	0	0
Best bowling	2/21	–	2/28	2/35
Catches/stumpings	1/–	9/–	4/–	3/–
- Source: ESPNcricinfo, 8 November 2024

Sharad Vesawkar (Nepali: शरद भेष्वाकर, born 6 October 1988) is a Nepalese professional cricketer. He is a right-handed middle-order batsman and a right-arm off break bowler. He made his debut for Nepal against the UAE in March 2004. He played in Nepal's first ever One Day International (ODI) match, against the Netherlands, in August 2018.

Vesawkar became the third Nepalese cricketer to score an international century, when he slammed an unbeaten 105 off 134 balls against Fiji during the 2010 ICC World Cricket League Division Five in February 2010.

He was the captain of Panchakanya Tej of the Everest Premier League in 2016 and also a captain of Bhairahawa Gladiators of same Everest Premier League from 2017 to 2021. He also represents the APF Club of the National League and Sudur Pashchimanchal Academy, which plays in the SPA Cup.

As a captain he took his another team Biratnagar Kings in final of Dhanghadi Premier League in first season on 2017. He also led another team Pokhara Paltan of Pokhara Premier League for 2017 and 2018 as a captain. In 2017 his team Pokhara Paltan won first season of Pokhara Premier League and in 2018 his team lost the final. He also led Pokhara Avengers on first season of Nepal T20 League.

== Personal life ==
Vesawkar was born and raised in UAE, as the second son of Dilip Vesawkar, an engineer, and his wife Himali. On his father's side, he is of Indian descent, and on his mother's side, he is of Nepalese descent. He, along with his brother, Mahendra, learnt to play cricket in his childhood in the country. The family returned to Nepal in 1995 after his father's retirement. He was married to Nepali Actress Nisha Adhikari.

== International career ==
Vesawkar first represented Nepal at Under-15 level, playing in the Under-15 Asia Cup in the United Arab Emirates in December 2002. In his second match against Qatar Under-15s he scored a century to win the man of the match award.

He first played at Under-19 level in April 2003 on a tour of India. Later in the year, he played in the Youth Asia Cup in Karachi and won the man of the match award in the final against Malaysia Under-19s. The following year he played in the ACC Under-17 Cup in India and the 2004 ICC Under-19 Cricket World Cup in Bangladesh.

In 2004, he made his début for the Nepal senior side in what was also his first first-class match against the UAE in the 2004 ICC Intercontinental Cup. He also played an Intercontinental Cup match against Malaysia the next month. He also played in the 2004 ACC Trophy in Kuala Lumpur that year in addition to ACC Fast Track Countries Tournament matches against Singapore, the UAE and Hong Kong.

In 2005, he played ACC Fast Track Countries Tournament matches against Malaysia, the UAE and Hong Kong. The games against the UAE and Hong Kong also counted towards the 2005 ICC Intercontinental Cup. He played in the ACC Under-19 Cup in Nepal that November. He played for Nepal Under-19s in a second Under-19 World Cup in February 2006.

In March 2006 he played in a play-off match against Namibia to decide the final spot in the 2006 ICC Intercontinental Cup. Needing an outright win to qualify, Nepal could only secure a draw after there was no play on the first day. Later in the year he played on a tour of Pakistan with Nepal in addition to playing in the ACC Trophy and ACC Premier League.

In 2002, while playing in the selection event for U-15, Sarad was determined to get selected or leave cricket. He got selected from inter-school competition to the regional team and then for the closed camp training for the national team. During the camp, he six five half-centuries against visiting Indian clubs in six matches - an indication of the glorious days ahead.

The first international event for Vesawka was unforgettable - not only because it was his first also because he got to start his career on the soil where he was born - UAE. He was one of the best batsmen of the event scoring 275 runs in 8 matches including a 106 against Qatar and 78 against India. With that he was selected for the Dream Team and visited Sri Lanka—news he couldn't tell to his father, who died in India on his business trip due to a heart attack.

Today, Sarad is a mainstay batsman of Nepali national team. He was one of the key players of the U-19 squad that won the plate championship in 2006 defeating South Africa and New Zealand.

In 1995, his father retired and as his mother wished, the family returned Nepal. After coming to Nepal, a country where cricket was still infant, he knew how much he loved cricket as he started missing playing it. He studied a year at the Modern Indian School and then admitted in Himalayan Vidhya Mandir in 1996.

His love for cricket forced him to find a playing area - a long field a few blocks away from his home. "There were houses on both sides," he says. "So we were forced to play straight shots so to avoid breaking windows." That somehow helped him becoming a batsman.

When he was in standard seven, Everest Cricket Coaching Academy was established in Ratopul - near from his home. He was one of 100 first batch trainees learning with chief coach Arun Aryal and Samsom Jung Thapa. Many established cricketers such as Kiran Rana, Rajesh Pant, Munir Shrestha, Manish Shrestha, Raju Basnet and Prafulla Vaidhya frequented the academy and he was one of very few trainees who never fears to bat against them.

In July 2018, he was named in Nepal's squad for their One Day International (ODI) series against the Netherlands. These were Nepal's first ODI matches since gaining ODI status during the 2018 Cricket World Cup Qualifier. He made his ODI debut for Nepal against the Netherlands on 1 August 2018.

In October 2018, he was named in Nepal's squad in the Eastern sub-region group for the 2018–19 ICC World Twenty20 Asia Qualifier tournament. In June 2019, he was named in Nepal's squad for the Regional Finals of the 2018–19 ICC T20 World Cup Asia Qualifier tournament. In November 2019, he was named in Nepal's squad for the 2019 ACC Emerging Teams Asia Cup in Bangladesh. In September 2020, he was one of eighteen cricketers to be awarded with a central contract by the Cricket Association of Nepal.

== Career highlights ==
Vesawkar is a player who gained popularity among the supporters as a defensive batsman when he first came to reckoning in 2004, however, to one's surprise he portrayed a batsman completely opposite to his pro-claimed identity in 2013 ICC World Twenty20 Qualifier which exuberantly lead Nepal to the 2014 ICC World Twenty20.

His game play drastically transformed from a toddler/nudger to an aggressive player who happens to be an extremely attacking player when needed. He blasted three sixes when 17 runs were required in the last over as Nepal completed their highest ever chase of 183 runs against Kenya during the 2013 ICC World Twenty20 Qualifier which recorded one of the most unprecedented victories in history of Nepalese and Associate cricket.

In 2002, while playing in the selection event for U-15, Sarad was determined to get selected or leave cricket. He got selected from inter-school competition to the regional team and then for the closed camp training for the national team. During the camp, he six five half-centuries against visiting Indian clubs in six matches - an indication of the glorious days ahead.

He continued his form smashing 10 of the 13 required, and took a single off the last ball leading to a nail-biting five-wicket victory against Hong Kong in the quarter-final of the 2013 ICC World Twenty20 Qualifier. In the match against UAE for third position, he scored an unbeaten 43 runs off just 29 balls including two sixes in first two balls of last over to seal the match. In short, Vesawkar's batting played a pivotal part leading Nepal to the 2014 ICC World Twenty20.

He started his career in 2004 and faced many difficulties. Lack of citizenship was the worst thing he faced over the years. He finally got his citizenship before the 2013 ICC World Twenty20 Qualifier and in return he paved the path of 2014 ICC World Twenty20 for Nepal.

He scored an unbeaten 91 off just 45 balls against Singapore in the knock-out match of the Sagarmatha Cement Journey to World Cup tournament in December 2013. He scored 32 runs off the thirty-ninth over that includes 5 SIXes and a two.

He also scored 40 runs against Bangladesh and 37 runs against Afghanistan in the 2014 ICC World Twenty20.

In August 2014, he traveled to the United States as he was called to play for the Punjab Lions in a Chicago-based tournament. He also played in the North Texas League during the weekends.

The first international event for Sarad was unforgettable - not only because it was his first also because he got to start his career on the soil where he was born - UAE. He was one of the best batsmen of the event scoring 275 runs in 8 matches including a 106 against Qatar and 78 against India. With that he got selected for the Dream Team and visited Sri Lanka - a news he couldn't tell to his father, who died in India on his business trip due to a heart attack.

Today, Sarad is a mainstay batsman of Nepali national team. He was one of the key players of the U-19 squad that won the plate championship in 2006 defeating South Africa and New Zealand.
