= Lalitpur Patriots =

Nepali cricket franchise team

- ललितपुर पेट्रियट्स
- Nickname(s): Lakheys; The Patriots
- League: Everest Premier League

Personnel
- Captain: Kushal Bhurtel
- Coach: Raju Basnyat
- Owner: Kishore Maharjan

Team information
- City: Lalitpur
- Founded: 2017; 8 years ago
- Home ground: Engineering Campus Ground
- Capacity: 5,000

History
- Everest Premier League wins: 1 (2018)

Lalitpur Patriots (Nepali: ललितपुर प्टरियर्टस) was a professional cricket franchise team based in Lalitpur, Nepal, which participated in the Everest Premier League. Founded in 2017, the team was owned by Kishore Maharjan and Srijana Joshi Maharjan. They won the 2018 edition of the league defeating Bhairahawa Gladiators by 14 runs, under the leadership of captain Gyanendra Malla. As of November 2018, Raju Basnyat was the head coach for the franchise. The team was captained by Kushal Bhurtel in 2021.

== Records ==
Year	Everest Premier League	Ref
2017	Playoffs	
2018	Champions	
