= Pokhara Rhinos =

Pokhara based franchisee of the Everest Premier League

- पोखरा राइनो
- League: Everest Premier League

Personnel
- Captain: Binod Bhandari
- Coach: Nathan Dodd
- Owner: Sahil Agarwal Deepa Agarwal

Team information
- City: Pokhara
- Founded: 2017; 9 years ago

History
- Everest Premier League wins: 0

Pokhara Rhinos was a Nepalese professional cricket franchise based in Pokhara, which played in the Everest Premier League.

== Results and standings ==
Year	League standing	Final standing
2017	4th	Playoffs
2018	6th	League stage
2019	Postponed	
2020	Postponed	
2021	2nd	Runners-up
