= Everest Premier League =

Former cricket league in Nepal

Everest Premier League (EPL)
- Logo of Everest Premier League
- Countries: Nepal
- Administrator: EPL Pvt Ltd
- Format: T20
- First edition: 2016
- Latest edition: 2021
- Tournament format: Double round-robin and Knockout
- Number of teams: 10
- Current champion: Chitwan Tigers
- Most successful: Biratnagar Warriors; Chitwan Tigers; Lalitpur Patriots; Panchakanya Tej (1 title each)
- Most runs: Sunil Dhamala (477)
- Most wickets: Karan KC (26)
- TV: List of broadcaster
- Website: eplt20.com.np

Everest Premier League (EPL) (Nepali: एभरेष्ट प्रिमियर लिग) was a franchise Twenty20 cricket tournament organized by EPL Pvt. Ltd., a private group in Nepal. It was the biggest cricket tournament in the country, played during the northern winter calendar, mostly in the month of December. It was played in round-robin format in which top four teams qualify for the playoffs. The tournament was renowned for having high attendance among the domestic cricket of the ICC associate nations. The first edition of the tournament was held in September 2016 with six franchises consisting of domestic and international players. Chitwan Tigers are the defending champions after winning the 2021 season. From 2024 Nepal Premier League replaces the league.

== History ==
Everest Premier League was unveiled on 24 February 2014 in a press conference held at Hotel Radisson. Zohra Sports Management and Cricket Association of Nepal had an exclusive agreement to introduce NPL for an initial three years.

On 13 May 2014 a handful of CAN members issued a press release claiming CAN had pulled out as the organizers of the tournament. In 2016, EPL was announced from 24 September to 3 October in TU Cricket Ground. While a majority of CAN members resigned from NPL Governing Council, the then President, Tanka Angbuhang still continued to promote the event stating that the decision made was unofficial and without his knowledge. The sponsor for 2014 was C.G. Foods (Wai Wai).

== Teams ==
Locations of Everest Premier League teams

Each team consisted of 15 players. Among them 10 players were bought by each team through auction. A talent hunt was conducted by each team in their respective cities to acquire a young player in their squad. Similarly, the teams also included at least three foreign players in their team.

Team	Owner	Home ground
Bhairahawa Gladiators	Aditya Shanghai	Siddhartha Rangasala
Biratnagar Warriors	Vishal Agrawal	Baijanathpur Cricket Ground
Chitwan Tigers	Kishore Bhattarai	Gautam Buddha Cricket Stadium
Kathmandu Kings XI	Rohit Gupta	Mulpani Cricket Stadium
Lalitpur Patriots	Kishore Maharjan	Engineering Campus Ground &Tribhuvan University Cricket Ground
Pokhara Rhinos	Shahil Agrawal	Pokhara Rangsala

=== 2016 teams ===
In the 2016 edition, the teams in the tournament were based on corporate sectors.

Team	Owner(s)
Vishal Warriors	Vishal Group
Colors X-Factors	Teletalk Private Limited
Jagdamba Rhinos	Shanker Groups
Panchakanya Tej	Panchakanya Groups
Kantipur Gurkhas	Kantipur Publications
Sagarmatha Legends	Ghorahi Cements

== Tournament seasons and results ==
All season's results are in a table.

Season	Final venue	Final			Player of the series
Season	Final venue	Winner	Result	Runner-up	Player of the series
2016; Details	TU Cricket Ground, Kirtipur	Panchakanya Tej; 171/4 (20 overs)	Tej won by 40 runs Scorecard	Colors X-Factors; 131 (17.3 overs)	Sompal Kami (Jagdamba Rhinos)
2017; Details	TU Cricket Ground, Kirtipur	Biratnagar Warriors; 149/7 (20 overs)	Warriors won by 1 run Scorecard	Bhairahawa Gladiators; 148/9 (20 overs)	Babar Hayat (Biratnagar Warriors)
2018; Details	TU Cricket Ground, Kirtipur	Lalitpur Patriots; 155 (19.1 overs)	Patriots won by 14 runs Scorecard	Bhairahawa Gladiators; 141/9 (20 overs)	Ravi Inder Singh (Bhairahawa Gladiators)
2021; Details	TU Cricket Ground, Kirtipur	Chitwan Tigers; 114/6 (15.5 overs)	Tigers won by 4 wickets Scorecard	Pokhara Rhinos; 111 (17.5 overs)	Sagar Dhakal (Chitwan Tigers)

== Broadcasting ==
- Kantipur Gold (2016)
- Eurosport (2019–2021)
- AP1 Television (2017–2019)
- 1Sports (2020–2021)
- Himalaya TV (2021)

== See also ==
- Cricket in Nepal
- Sports in Nepal
- List of professional sports leagues in Nepal
- List of cricket leagues in Nepal
- Nepal Premier League
