= Aasif Sheikh (cricketer) =

Nepalese cricketer (born 2001)

Personal information
- Born: 22 June 2001 (age 25); Birgunj, Nepal
- Height: 5 ft 10 in (178 cm)
- Batting: Right-handed
- Role: Wicket-keeper-batter
- Relatives: Aarif Sheikh (brother)

International information
- National side: Nepal (2021–present)
- ODI debut (cap 24): 7 September 2021 v PNG
- Last ODI: 29 April 2026 v Oman
- T20I debut (cap 32): 17 April 2021 v Netherlands
- Last T20I: 17 February 2026 v Scotland
- T20I shirt no.: 9

Domestic team information
- Years: Team
- 2024: Janakpur Bolts
- 2026–present: Lumbini Lions

Career statistics
Competition	ODI	T20I	LA	T20
Matches	65	72	71	79
Runs scored	1,703	1,710	1,951	1,884
Batting average	28.38	25.14	27.96	25.80
100s/50s	1/13	0/10	2/13	0/12
Top score	110	69	161	87*
Catches/stumpings	45/7	37/16	49/7	38/18
- Source: Cricinfo, 29 August 2026

Aasif Sheikh (Note: Nepali: आसिफ शेख) (born 22 June 2001) is a Nepalese cricketer who plays as a right-handed wicket-keeper-batsman. He made his debut for Nepal against the Netherlands in a Twenty20 International in April 2021. He is renowned for his classical batting style. He has the most ODI cricket half-centuries for Nepal, with 13.

He represents the Armed Police Force Club of the Prime minister domestic cup and Pokhara Paltan of the Pokhara Premier League.

== Early domestic career and U-19 ==
Sheikh plays for Panchakanya Tej in the Everest Premier League. He scored an unbeaten 111 runs in the final of the 2016 Everest Premier League, helping his team to win the maiden EPL title. He was the leading run-scorer of the tournament, where he scored 202 runs in six matches at an average of 44.00.

He led the Nepalese Under-19 team in the 2018 Quadrangular Cricket Tournament in India. Later, he was named the skipper of the Nepal national under-19 cricket team for the 2018 ACC Under-19 Asia Cup. He also played for the Under-19 team in the 2019 ACC Under-19 Asia Cup.

== International career ==
After being the second highest scorer of the tournament in the 2021 Prime Minister Cup, where he scored 206 runs in five innings at an average of 41.20, he was selected in the 18-member national team for the closed camps for the T20I series against Qatar. However, the tour was eventually postponed due to the increasing COVID-19 cases in Qatar.

Sheikh was subsequently selected in the 15-member national squad for the 2020–21 Nepal Tri-Nation Series and made his T20I debut against Netherlands. He scored an unbeaten half-century and put up a record first-wicket partnership of 116 runs for Nepal in T20Is guiding his team to a 9-wicket victory. He scored 42 runs in the second match of the series against Malaysia and shared another century stand with a fellow opener Kushal Bhurtel. He scored 154 runs in the series at an average of 38.50 and a strike-rate of 138.73.

In August 2021, Sheikh was named in Nepal's One Day International (ODI) squad for their series against Papua New Guinea in Oman, and their squad for round six of the 2019–2023 ICC Cricket World Cup League 2 tournament, also in Oman. He made his ODI debut on 7 September 2021, for Nepal against Papua New Guinea.

In March 2023, Sheikh scored his first century in ODIs during a match against Papua New Guinea.

In May 2024, he was named in Nepal's squad for the 2024 ICC Men's T20 World Cup tournament.

In January 2026, Sheikh was selected in Nepal's squad for 2026 T20I World Cup.

=== Records and milestones ===
ODI

- Member of an honorary club to score 200 runs and take 10 wicket-keeping dismissals in a series
- 8th most runs in a series by a wicket-keeper - 685 runs

== Honours ==
He was named as the recipient of the 2022 ICC Spirit of Cricket Award at the 2022 ICC Awards in recognition of his act on his decision not to runout Irish player Andy McBrine during a T20I fixture in February 2022 between Ireland and Nepal which was played as a part of the Quadrangular series held in Oman. Mcbrine collided with the bowler and fell down halfway up the pitch. Sheikh allowed Mcbrine to complete the run, and subsequently became the first player from Nepal to win the ICC's Spirit of Cricket Award.
