= Bhairahawa Gladiators =

Bhairahawa based franchise cricket team in Nepal

- भैरहवा ग्लाडियटर्स
- Nickname(s): The Gladiators
- League: Everest Premier League

Personnel
- Captain: Sharad Vesawkar
- Coach: Pubudu Dassanayake
- Fielding coach: N/A
- Owner: Aditya Sanghai

Team information
- City: Bhairahawa
- Colours: Orange, yellow
- Founded: 2017; 8 years ago
- Home ground: Siddhartha Rangasala
- Capacity: 1,000
- Secondary home ground(s): Lord Buddha International Cricket Stadium, Sainamaina, Rupandehi District
- Secondary ground capacity: 80,000

History
- Everest Premier League wins: 0
- Notable players: (Nepal) Sharad Vesawkar (Bangladesh) Tamim Iqbal (Sri Lanka) Upul Tharanga (United Arab Emirates) Mohammad Naveed (Nepal) Aarif Sheikh

Bhairahawa Gladiators was a professional cricket team based in Bhairahawa, Nepal, which participated in the Everest Premier League. Under the leadership of captain Sharad Vesawkar, they reached the finals of two editions, losing to Biratnagar Warriors and Lalitpur Patriots by 1 and 14 runs respectively.

== Statistics ==
=== Season by season ===
EPL summary of results
Y	P	W	L	T	NR	WP	PO
2016	-	-	-	-	-	-	-
2017	8	5	3	-	-	62.5%	2/6
2018	8	5	3	-	-	62.5%	3/6
2019	Postponed due to covid-19						
2020	Postponed due to covid-19						

Last updated: 31 December 2020

Legend's
- Y=Year
- P=Played
- W=Wins
- L=Losses
- T=Tied
- NR=No result
- WP=Winning percentage
- PO=Position

== Tournament standing ==
Year	League standing	Final standing
2017	2nd out of 6	Runners up
2018	3rd out of 6	Runners up
2019	Postponed due to covid-19	
2020	Postponed due to covid-19	
2021	3rd out of 6	Playoffs
