= Aarif Sheikh =

Nepalese cricketer (born 1997)

Personal information
- Born: 4 October 1997 (age 29); Birgunj, Nepal
- Batting: Right-handed
- Bowling: Right-arm medium
- Role: Batsman
- Relatives: Aasif Sheikh (brother)

International information
- National side: Nepal (2015–present)
- ODI debut (cap 1): 1 August 2018 v Netherlands
- Last ODI: 29 July 2026 v Netherlands
- ODI shirt no.: 24
- T20I debut (cap 18): 29 July 2018 v Netherlands
- Last T20I: 7 June 2026 v Oman
- T20I shirt no.: 24

Domestic team information
- Years: Team
- 2015: APF
- 2016: Panchakanya Tej
- 2017–2021: Bhairahawa Gladiators
- 2021–present: Nepal Police Club
- 2024—present: Sudurpaschim Royals

Career statistics
Competition	ODI	T20I	FC	LA
Matches	77	51	1	101
Runs scored	1604	592	29	1912
Batting average	27.65	18.50	14.50	23.60
100s/50s	0/9	0/0	0/0	0/10
Top score	84	39*	19	84
Balls bowled	773	96	30	1025
Wickets	971	4	0	9
Bowling average	84.66	33.00	–	88.44
5 wickets in innings	0	0	–	0
10 wickets in match	0	0	–	0
Best bowling	1/9	1/2	–	1/9
Catches/stumpings	35/–	10/–	10/–	43/–
Medal record
Representing Nepal
Men's Cricket
South Asian Games
Bronze medal – third place	2019 Kathmandu/Pokhara	Team
- Source: ESPNcricinfo,, 2 September 2026

Aarif Sheikh (Note: Nepali: आरिफ शेख्) (born 4 October 1997) is a Nepalese cricketer, who has been a former vice-captain of the Nepal under-19 cricket team and currently plays for the senior team. Aarif is a right-handed batsman and a right-arm medium pace bowler. He made his List A debut for Nepal in the 2015 ICC World Cricket League Division Two tournament against Namibia on 21 January 2015. He was one of the eleven cricketers to play in Nepal's first ever One Day International (ODI) match, against the Netherlands, in August 2018.

His younger brother, Aasif Sheikh, also plays for the national team as a Wicket-keeper batter. Aarif has been known for guiding his younger brother as a mentor in their childhood. They have been playing together in the national team since 2021, mostly in ODI-Format of the game.

== Career ==
=== Early career ===
Aarif first represented the Nepal Under-19s in the 2014 ACC Under-19 Asia Cup in December 2013. He scored 25 runs against Pakistan, 40 runs against India and 48 runs against UAE in the tournament.

In the national one-day tournament held in Kathmandu, he was named Player of the Tournament where he scored a total of 261 runs with an average of 52.20 and picked up 11 wickets.

Following his impressive performances in the national tournament, he was selected in the national squad for the 2014 ACC Premier League. Playing his debut match for Nepal, he picked up 2 wickets against Hong Kong where he also bowled the Hong Kong captain Jamie Atkinson. He also picked up 2 wickets in the match against Afghanistan.

He went to India along with his teammate Karan KC in September 2014 for a 10-day training at Just Cricket Academy in Bangalore before participating in the 2014 ICC World Cricket League Division Three tournament.

He represented Nepal Under-19s in the 2014 ACC Under-19 Premier League, where he was the second leading run scorer. He scored 190 runs in 5 innings at an average of 38.00. He made List A debut in 2015 ICC World Cricket League Division Two in Namibia in January 2015.

=== 2018–present ===
He was a member of Nepal's squad for the 2018 ICC World Cricket League Division Two tournament.

In July 2018, he was named in Nepal's squad for their One Day International (ODI) series against the Netherlands. These were Nepal's first ODI matches since gaining ODI status during the 2018 Cricket World Cup Qualifier. He made his Twenty20 debut for Nepal in the 2018 MCC Tri-Nation Series against the Marylebone Cricket Club on 29 July 2018. He made his Twenty20 International (T20I) on the same day, against the Netherlands. He made his ODI debut for Nepal against the Netherlands on 1 August 2018.

In August 2018, he was named in Nepal's squad for the 2018 Asia Cup Qualifier tournament. In October 2018, he was named in Nepal's squad in the Eastern sub-region group for the 2018–19 ICC World Twenty20 Asia Qualifier tournament.

He made his first-class debut on 6 November 2019, for Nepal against the Marylebone Cricket Club (MCC), during the MCC's tour of Nepal. Later the same month, he was named in Nepal's squads for the 2019 ACC Emerging Teams Asia Cup in Bangladesh, and the men's cricket tournament at the 2019 South Asian Games. The Nepal team won the bronze medal, after they beat the Maldives by five wickets in the third-place playoff match. In September 2020, he was one of eighteen cricketers to be awarded with a central contract by the Cricket Association of Nepal.

In January 2026, Sheikh was named in Nepal's squad for 2026 T20I World Cup.
