= Karan KC =

Nepalese cricketer (born 1991)

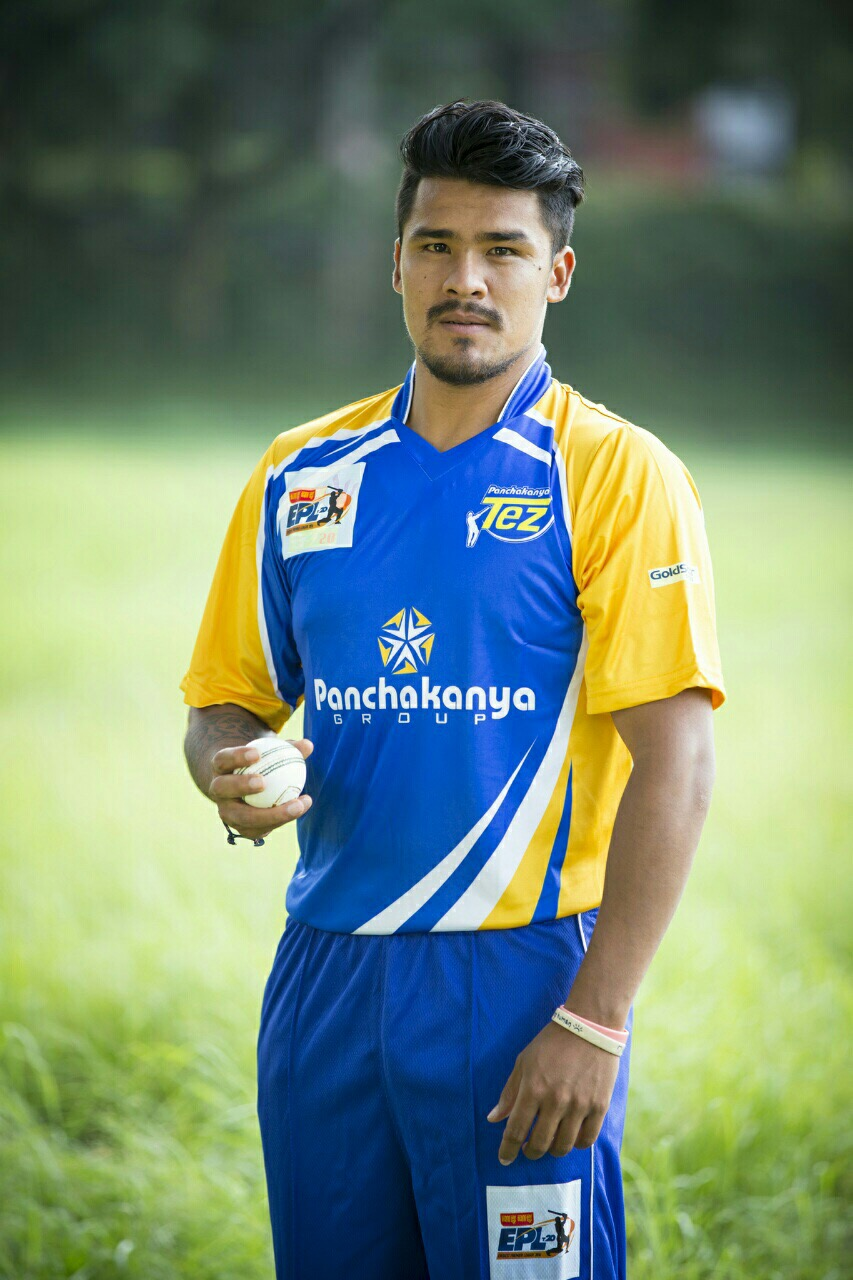
- Karan playing for Panchakanya Tej in EPL 2016

Personal information
- Full name: Karan Khatri Chhetri
- Born: 10 October 1991 (age 35); Baglung, Nepal
- Nickname: Valentine Boy
- Batting: Right-handed
- Bowling: Right-arm fast-medium
- Role: Bowling all-rounder

International information
- National side: Nepal (2015–present)
- ODI debut (cap 4): 1 August 2018 v Netherlands
- Last ODI: 10 June 2025 v Netherlands
- ODI shirt no.: 33
- T20I debut (cap 15): 3 February 2015 v Netherlands
- Last T20I: 8 February 2026 v England
- T20I shirt no.: 33

Domestic team information
- Years: Team
- 2014–2015: Pokhara
- 2014–2014: Panchakanya Tej
- 2015–2015: Pentagon
- 2016-2016: Panchakanya Tej
- 2017–2018: Biratnagar Warriors
- 2021: Pune Devils
- 2024–present: Kathmandu Gorkhas

Career statistics
Competition	ODI	T20I	FC	LA
Matches	61	81	1	86
Runs scored	565	468	20	710
Batting average	16.61	15.09	10.00	15.43
100s/50s	0/1	0/0	0/0	0/1
Top score	65*	45	18	65*
Balls bowled	2,636	1,591	186	3,630
Wickets	86	103	6	116
Bowling average	26.33	20.14	18.66	25.46
5 wickets in innings	3	1	1	4
10 wickets in match	0	0	0	0
Best bowling	5/33	5/21	3/45	5/26
Catches/stumpings	12/–	26/–	1/–	19/–
Medal record
Representing Nepal
Men's Cricket
South Asian Games
Bronze medal – third place	2019 Kathmandu/Pokhara	Team
- Source: ESPNcricinfo, 3 July 2025

Karan Khatri Chhetri (Nepali: करण खत्री क्षेत्री, born 10 October 1991), known as Karan KC, (Valentine boy) is a Nepalese professional cricketer. He played in Nepal's first ever One Day International (ODI) match, against the Netherlands in August 2018. Karan is a right-handed batsman and a right-arm fast-medium bowler. He made his debut against Uganda in January 2015. KC became the second cricketer of Nepal to take his 100th wicket in T20Is. He was the Nepali first player to claim five wickets in a T20I for Nepal against PNG.

He guided Nepal to a one-wicket victory against Canada in the final match of the 2018 World Cricket League Division Two in Windhoek, Namibia, on 14 February 2018. The victory ensured Nepal a berth for the 2018 Cricket World Cup Qualifier to be held in March in Zimbabwe.

Karan represents Region No. 8 Pokhara in the National League, Panchakanya Tej of the Everest Premier League, and Pentagon International College in the SPA Cup. He represented Panchakanya Tej in the Everest Premier League, 2016.

Over his career, he has accumulated over 100 wickets in both ODIs and T20Is, serving as a dependable strike bowler alongside his late-order power-hitting cameos.

== Playing career ==
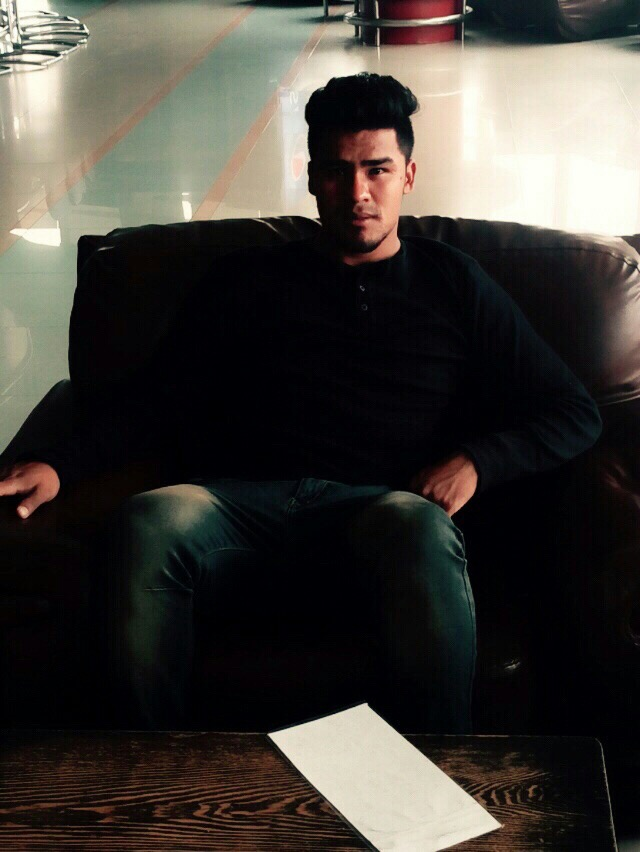

Karan was born in Baglung, Nepal and brought up in Chandigarh, India. He represented Panchakanya Tej in the 2014 Nepal Premier League, where he picked up 10 wickets in 7 matches, at an average of 13.40.

He was selected in the 18-man preliminary squad for the 2014 World Cricket League Division Three but did not make it to the playing eleven. Subsequently, he and his teammate Aarif Sheikh were sent to India in September 2014 for a 10-day training camp at Just Cricket Academy in Bangalore.

He was part of the team that toured Sri Lanka in November 2014 where he played two, three-day matches against Sri Lanka Combined XI.

He made his List A debut in the 2015 World Cricket League Division Two in Namibia in January 2015. Playing his first tournament for Nepal, he picked up 9 wickets in 6 matches at an average of 15.88 and an economy rate of 3.31, including a five-wicket haul against Canada, which are the best bowling figures by a Nepalese bowler in the List A format.

== International career ==
He made his Twenty20 International debut against the Netherlands on 30 June 2015.

Karan scored 42 runs not out in the must-win match against Canada, helping Nepal win the match off the last ball and qualify for the 2018 Cricket World Cup Qualifier.

In July 2018, Karan was named in Nepal's squad for their One Day International (ODI) series against the Netherlands. These were Nepal's first ODI matches since gaining ODI status during the 2018 Cricket World Cup Qualifier. He made his ODI debut for Nepal against the Netherlands on 1 August 2018.

In August 2018, he was named in Nepal's squad for the 2018 Asia Cup Qualifier tournament. In October of the same year, he was named in Nepal's squad for the Eastern sub-regional group in the 2018–19 ICC World Twenty20 Asia Qualifier tournament. In June 2019, he was named in Nepal's squad for the Regional Finals of the 2018–19 T20 World Cup Asia Qualifier tournament. In September 2019, he was named in both Nepal's squad for the 2019–20 Singapore Tri-Nation Series and 2019–20 Oman Pentangular Series. In the match against Netherlands in the Pentangular Series, he took 4 wickets for 17 runs, and played a match-winning knock of 31 not out.

He made his first-class debut on 6 November 2019, for Nepal against the Marylebone Cricket Club (MCC), during the MCC's tour of Nepal. Later the same month, he was named in Nepal's squads for the 2019 ACC Emerging Teams Asia Cup in Bangladesh, and for the cricket tournament at the 2019 South Asian Games. The Nepal team won the bronze medal, after they beat the Maldives by five wickets in the third-place playoff match. In September 2020, he was one of eighteen cricketers awarded a central contract by the Cricket Association of Nepal.

In May 2024, he was named in Nepal's squad for the 2024 Men's T20 World Cup tournament.

In January 2026, Karan was named in Nepal's squad for 2026 T20I World Cup.
