= Sompal Kami =

Nepalese cricketer (born 1996)

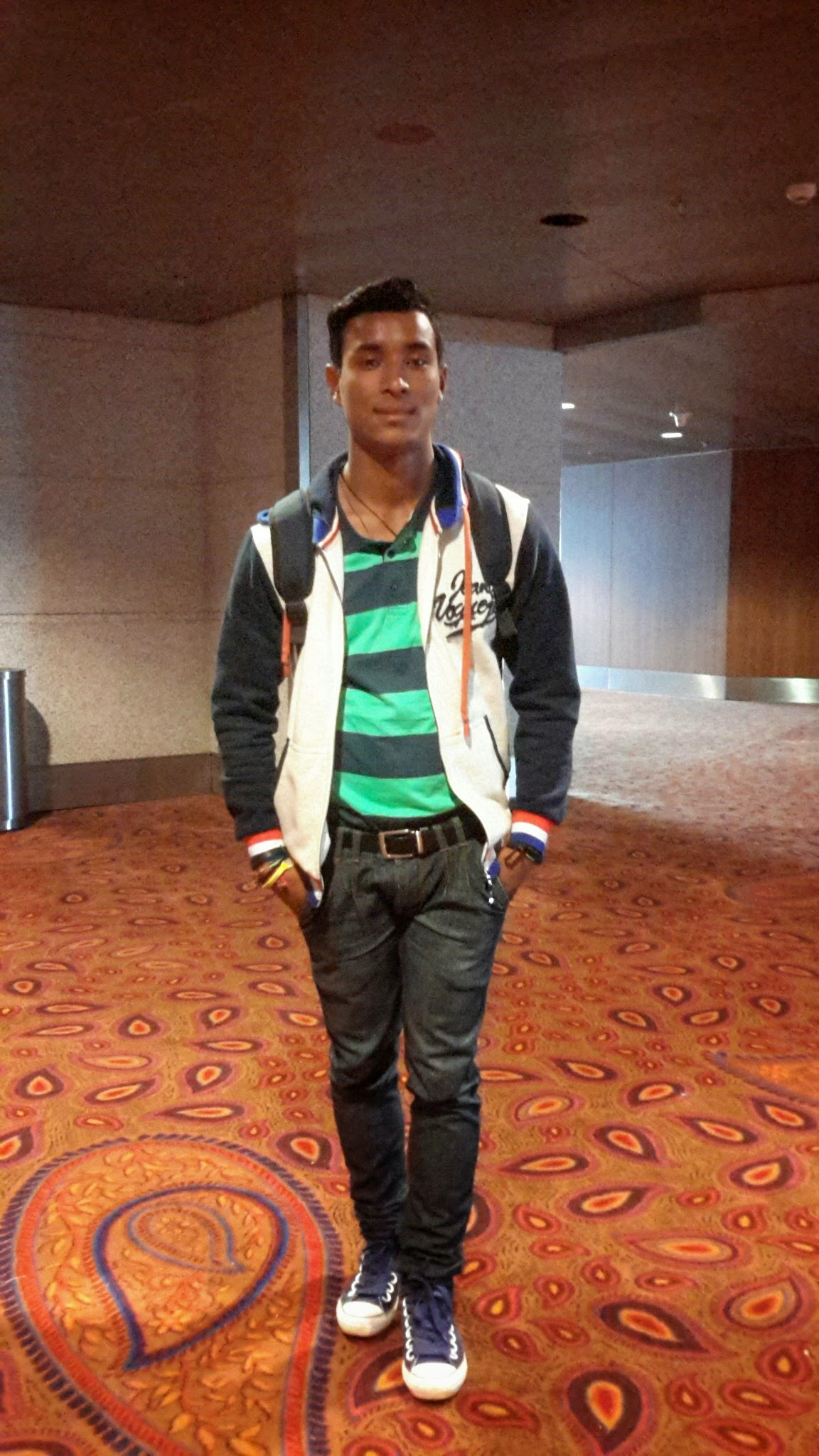

Personal information
- Born: 2 February 1996 (age 30); Chandrakot, Gulmi
- Nickname: Gulmi Express, Somu
- Batting: Right-handed
- Bowling: Right-arm Fast medium
- Role: Bowling all-rounder

International information
- National side: Nepal (2014-present)
- ODI debut (cap 10): 1 August 2018 v Netherlands
- Last ODI: 4 November 2024 v Scotland
- T20I debut (cap 10): 16 March 2014 v Hong Kong
- Last T20I: 20 October 2024 v USA

Domestic team information
- Years: Team
- 2014: Jagdamba Giants
- 2015: Nepal Army
- 2017–2019: Kathmandu Kings XI
- 2019: Winnipeg Hawks
- 2021: Chitwan Tigers
- 2022–present: Tribhuwan Army Club
- 2024–present: Karnali Yaks

Career statistics
Competition	ODI	T20I	FC	LA
Matches	61	74	3	105
Runs scored	691	329	77	1186
Batting average	20.93	10.61	25.66	19.76
100s/50s	0/2	0/0	0/1	0/3
Top score	63	40	51	75
Balls bowled	2668	1402	336	4513
Wickets	79	70	6	137
Bowling average	28.89	23.85	41.50	28.03
5 wickets in innings	1	0	0	2
10 wickets in match	0	0	0	0
Best bowling	5/33	3/20	2/8	5/27
Catches/stumpings	14/–	25/–	2/–	22/–
Medal record
Representing Nepal
Men's Cricket
South Asian Games
Bronze medal – third place	2019 Kathmandu/Pokhara	Team
- Source: ESPNcricinfo, 5 November 2024

Sompal Kami (Nepali: सोमपाल कामी; born 2 February 1996) is a Nepalese professional cricketer. Kami is a right-handed batsman and a right-arm fast-medium bowler. He is one of the eleven cricketers to play in Nepal's first ever One Day International (ODI) match, against the Netherlands, in August 2018. In January 2019, he became the first bowler for Nepal to take a five-wicket haul in an ODI.

== Early life ==
Originally from Gulmi in western Nepal, Sompal was raised in India after his father moved to Punjab along with his family. Sompal spent his childhood as an enthusiastic cricket lover. He played in various school-level tournaments. Most notable was his participation in the Indian Premier Corporate League where he was the captain. He returned to Nepal in 2013 and continued his cricket career.

== Domestic and T20 franchise career ==
Sompal made his entry to Kathmandu Region No. 3 through the Nepali Cricket Fan Club. He was one of the key players of Kathmandu Region No. 3, which won the U-19 National Championship. He broke a record in the tournament by scoring two centuries and achieving the best bowling figures. Through this tournament, he impressed the Nepal coach Jagat Tamatar and was able to cement his place in the national squad.

In an unofficial tournament, Sagarmatha Cement Journey to World Cup tournament in December 2013 in Kathmandu, Sompal was the leading wicket-taker with 10 wickets in four matches.

He made his first-class debut for Saracens Sports Club in the 2015–16 Premier League Tournament on 26 December 2015 in Sri Lanka.

In June 2019, he was selected to play for the Winnipeg Hawks franchise team in the 2019 Global T20 Canada tournament.

== International career ==
He made his debut for Nepal against the UAE in January 2014. He was subsequently selected in the Nepal national cricket team for the 2014 World Cup Qualifier in New Zealand.

Sompal played six List A matches in the 2014 World Cup Qualifier and took eight wickets – one less than spinner Basanta Regmi. He played three Twenty20 International matches in the 2014 ICC World Twenty20, held in Bangladesh, and took four wickets with best figures of 2/13.

Sompal picked up five wickets for 47 against Malaysia in the 2014 ACC Premier League in Malaysia, the best bowling figures of his career. He took 15 wickets in total and was adjudged the tournament's best bowler. During the 2014 Asian Games, Sompal took five wickets at an average of just 4 runs apiece and an exceptional economy rate of just 2.50. He was the only Nepalese player to be chosen in the Select XI of the tournament by Asian Cricket Council. He took 11 wickets in the 2014 ICC World Cricket League Division Three, which Nepal won.

In the first Twenty20 International of Nepal's November 2014 series against Hong Kong (played in Sri Lanka), Sompal, batting tenth, scored 40 runs from 31 balls in Nepal's first innings of 72 all out, which included six fours and two sixes. He consequently set a new record in all Twenty20 matches for the highest score made by a number ten batsman, surpassing the previous figure of 37 runs set by Sri Lankan Pradeep Nishantha in 2007. Sompal and Shakti Gauchan (5*) put on 43 runs for the ninth wicket, the fifth-best ninth-wicket partnership in Twenty20 Internationals.

He was the leading Nepalese wicket-taker in the 2015 ICC World Cricket League Division Two in Namibia. He picked up 11 wickets in 6 matches at an average of 19.18 and an economy of 4.00. In February 2015, he went Sri Lanka after being recruited by Kalutura Physical Culture Club to play in the Emerging Trophy Tournament, three-day cricket tournament. He played 5 matches and picked up 39 wickets in 8 innings. He took 6 wickets in the 2015 ICC World Twenty20 Qualifier at an average of 19.83 and an economy rate of 7.00.

He was in Nepal's squad for the 2018 ICC World Cricket League Division Two tournament. In the third match against UAE, he took 4/30 to restrict the opponent to 114 runs.

In July 2018, he was named in Nepal's squad for their One Day International (ODI) series against the Netherlands. These were Nepal's first ODI matches since gaining ODI status during the 2018 Cricket World Cup Qualifier. He made his ODI debut for Nepal against the Netherlands on 1 August 2018.

In August 2018, he was named in Nepal's squad for the 2018 Asia Cup Qualifier tournament. In October 2018, he was named in Nepal's squad in the Eastern sub-region group for the 2018–19 ICC World Twenty20 Asia Qualifier tournament.

On 26 January 2019, in the second ODI against the United Arab Emirates, Sompal became the first bowler for Nepal to take a five-wicket haul in an ODI match. In June 2019, he was named in Nepal's squad for the Regional Finals of the 2018–19 ICC T20 World Cup Asia Qualifier tournament. In November 2019, he was named in Nepal's squad for the 2019 ACC Emerging Teams Asia Cup in Bangladesh. Later the same month, he was also named in Nepal's squad for the cricket tournament at the 2019 South Asian Games. The Nepal team won the bronze medal after they beat the Maldives by five wickets in the third-place playoff match. In September 2020, he was one of eighteen cricketers to be awarded with a central contract by the Cricket Association of Nepal.

On 26 March 2024, he took his first hat-trick in T20s against the Ireland Wolves. In May 2024, he was named in Nepal's squad for the 2024 ICC Men's T20 World Cup tournament.

In January 2026, Kami was selected in Nepal's squad for 2026 T20I World Cup.
