= 1996 ACC Trophy =

- Administrator: Asian Cricket Council
- Cricket format: 50 overs per side
- Tournament format: Round robin with knockouts
- Host: Malaysia
- Champions: Bangladesh (1st title)
- Participants: 12 teams
- Matches: 33
- Most runs: (Bangladesh) Shahriar Hossain (300)
- Most wickets: (United Arab Emirates) Azhar Saeed (14)
- Official website: CricketArchive

The 1996 ACC Trophy was a cricket tournament in Malaysia, which took place from 6 to 16 September 1996. It gave Associate and Affiliate members of the Asian Cricket Council experience of international one-day cricket and also helped form an essential part of regional rankings. The tournament was won by Bangladesh who defeated the UAE in the final by 108 runs.

== Teams ==
The teams were separated into two groups of six. The following teams took part in the tournament:

- Bangladesh
- Brunei
- Fiji
- Hong Kong
- Japan
- Nepal
- Malaysia
- Maldives
- Papua New Guinea
- Singapore
- Thailand
- United Arab Emirates

== Group stages ==
The top two from each group qualified for the semi-finals.

=== Group A ===
Team	Pld	W	L	NR	NRR	Pts
Bangladesh	5	5	0	0	2.447	10
Fiji	5	4	1	0	2.372	8
Hong Kong	5	3	2	0	1.747	6
Nepal	5	2	3	0	–0.414	4
Brunei	5	1	4	0	–1.640	2
Japan	5	0	5	0	–5.099	0

6 September 1996
(scorecard)

Bangladesh; 213/9 (50 overs)	v	Nepal; 90/5 (39.2 overs)
Harunur Rashid 52; Raju Khadka 2/42 (? overs)		V. Karmacharya 24; Saiful Islam 2/12 (? overs)

Bangladesh won on faster scoring rate
Kuala Lumpur

- When play was halted at 39.2 over, Nepal needed to have scored 168 runs to win. Scorecard not complete.

6 September 1996
(scorecard)

Brunei; 230/9 (50 overs)	v	Japan; 71 all out (35 overs)
Stuart Alpe 58; Tomohiro Amino 3/28 (10 overs)		Hirokazu Takahashi 34; Manzur Ahmed 3/7 (5 overs)

Brunei won by 159 runs
Kuala Lumpur

6 September 1996
(scorecard)

Fiji; 225 all out (49.1 overs)	v	Hong Kong; 206/9 (47.4 overs)
Jone Sorovakatini 56; Stewart Brew 5/48 (? overs)		Stewart Brew 47; Lesi Sorovakatini 3/25 (? overs)

Fiji won by 19 runs
Tenaga National Sports Complex, Kuala Lumpur
Player of the match: Stewart Brew (Hong Kong)

- Scorecard not complete

7 September 1996
(scorecard)

Fiji; 156 all out (48.3 overs)	v	Bangladesh; 157/4 (39 overs)
Taione Batina 39; Salahuddin Ahmed 3/20 (10 overs)		Aminul Islam 44*; Jone Sorovakatini 1/23 (? overs)

Bangladesh won by 141 runs
Tenaga National Sports Complex, Kuala Lumpur

- Scorecard not complete

7 September 1996
(scorecard)

Japan; 72 all out (33 overs)	v	Nepal; 73/2 (15 overs)
H. Minami 17; L.B. Chhetri 3/8 (6 overs)		Manish Raj Pandey 27; A. Funayama 1/16 (3 overs)

Nepal won by 8 wickets
The Padang, Kuala Lumpur
Player of the match: Manish Raj Pandey (Nepal)

8 September 1996
(scorecard)

Brunei; 129/9 (50 overs)	v	Bangladesh; 133/1 (24 overs)
Sanjiv Sabharwal 22; Saiful Islam 4/21 (10 overs)		Harunur Rashid 66*; Ian Campbell 1/3 (? overs)

Bangladesh won by 9 wickets
Rubber Research Institute, Kuala Lumpur

- Scorecard not complete

8 September 1996
(scorecard)

Fiji; 257/7 (50 overs)	v	Nepal; 134 all out (40.2 overs)
Lesi Sorovakatini 70; Mosharraf 3/35 (? overs)		Pawan Agrawal 33; Lesi Sorovakatini 2/21 (? overs)

Fiji won by 123 runs
Kelab Aman, Kuala Lumpur

- Scorecard not complete

8 September 1996
(scorecard)

Japan; 89 all out (47.3 overs)	v	Hong Kong; 93/3 (12.4 overs)
Tetsuo Fuji 15; Stewart Brew 4/22 (10 overs)		Stewart Brew 50*; A. Funayama 2/65 (6.4 overs)

Hong Kong won by 7 wickets
Royal Military College, Sungai Besi

10 September 1996
(scorecard)

Bangladesh; 270/4 (42 overs)	v	Japan; 56 all out (27 overs)
Shahriar Hossain 104; Tetsuo Fuji 2/34 (3 overs)		Hirokazu Takahashi 25 (29); Akram Khan 6/5 (6 overs)

Bangladesh won on faster scoring rate
Kelab Aman, Kuala Lumpur

- Bangladesh innings reduced to 42 overs, Japan target was 242 runs in 37 overs

10 September 1996
(scorecard)

Hong Kong; 380/5 (50 overs)	v	Brunei; 93 all out (30 overs)
Rahul Sharma 139		R. Somasundram 37*; Rahul Sharma 3/11 (? overs)

Hong Kong won by 287 runs
Perbadanan Kemajuan Negari Selangor, Kuala Lumpur

- Scorecard not complete

11 September 1996
(scorecard)

Bangladesh; 224/7 (50 overs)	v	Hong Kong; 116 all out (40.1 overs)
Shahriar Hossain 67; Stewart Brew 3/56 (9 overs)		Pat Fordham 27; Salahuddin Ahmed 3/29 (10 overs)

Bangladesh won by 108 runs
Tenaga National Sports Complex, Kuala Lumpur
Player of the match: Saiful Islam (Bangladesh)

11 September 1996
(scorecard)

Nepal; 171 all out (45 overs)	v	Brunei; 93 all out (30 overs)
Pawan Agrawal 80; Ian Campbell 3/35 (? overs)		Stuart Alpe 26; Musharaf Izhar 3/8 (? overs)

Nepal won by 64 runs
Kelab Aman, Kuala Lumpur
Player of the match: Pawan Agrawal (Nepal)

- Scorecard not complete

11 September 1996
(scorecard)

Fiji; 469/7 (50 overs)	v	Japan; 89 all out (47.1 overs)
Joji Bulabalavu 150; Nobuyasa Yoshioka 2/67 (5 overs)		Kenichi Katohi 21; Seci Sekinini 3/11 (7 overs)

Fiji won by 380 runs
Royal Military College, Sungai Besi
Player of the match: Joji Bulabalavu (Fiji)

12 September 1996
(scorecard)

Brunei; 177/9 (50 overs)	v	Fiji; 181/6 (30.1 overs)
Brett MacRae 40; Seci Sekinini 3/35 (? overs)		Joeli Mateyawa 67*; R. Somasundram 2/30 (? overs)

Fiji won by 4 wickets
Perbadanan Kemajuan Negari Selangor, Kuala Lumpur

- Scorecard not complete

12 September 1996
(scorecard)

Nepal; 137 all out (49 overs)	v	Hong Kong; 139/4 (33.3 overs)
Musharaf Izhar 47; Ravi Sujanani 4/30 (? overs)		Mark Eames 43

Hong Kong won by 6 wickets
Royal Military College, Sungai Besi

- Scorecard not complete

=== Group B ===
Team	Pld	W	L	NR	NRR	Pts
United Arab Emirates	5	5	0	0	1.769	10
Papua New Guinea	5	4	1	0	1.426	8
Malaysia	5	3	2	0	0.859	6
Singapore	5	2	3	0	–1.153	4
Maldives	5	1	4	0	–0.059	2
Thailand	5	0	5	0	–3.549	0

6 September 1996
(scorecard)

Papua New Guinea; 172/8 (50 overs)	v	Malaysia; 46 all out (23.2 overs)
Vai Kevau 46; Tan Kim Hing 2/28 (? overs)		Dinesh Ramadas 12; Rarua Ipi 5/16 (? overs)

Papua New Guinea won by 126 runs
Perbadanan Kemajuan Negari Selangor, Kuala Lumpur
Player of the match: Rarua Ipi (Papua New Guinea)

- Scorecard not complete

6 September 1996
(scorecard)

Thailand; 129 all out (46.4 overs)	v	United Arab Emirates; 130/2 (21.1 overs)
Saleem Raza 4/13 (? overs)

United Arab Emirates won by 8 wickets
Kuala Lumpur

- Scorecard not complete

7 September 1996
(scorecard)

Malaysia; 114 all out (47.4 overs)	v	United Arab Emirates; 115/8 (47.4 overs)
Suresh Navaratnam 39; Saleem Raza 4/21 (? overs)		Azhar Saeed 25; Marimuthu Muniandy 5/29 (? overs)

United Arab Emirates won by 2 wickets
Perbadanan Kemajuan Negari Selangor, Kuala Lumpur

- Scorecard not complete

7 September 1996
(scorecard)

Papua New Guinea; 183 all out (46.3 overs)	v	Maldives; 149 all out (46.5 overs)
Aukuma Noka 56; Imad Ismail 3/34 (? overs)		Ahmed Kaleem 26; Vavine Pala 3/18 (? overs)

Papua New Guinea won by 34 runs
Kelab Aman, Kuala Lumpur

- Scorecard not complete

7 September 1996
(scorecard)

Thailand; 140/9 (50 overs)	v	Singapore; 141/2 (30.2 overs)
Varin Khaniyo 40; Anthon Ranggi 3/18 (? overs)		Thaiyar Mohamed 76*

Singapore won by 8 wickets
Rubber Research Institute, Kuala Lumpur

- Scorecard not complete

8 September 1996
(scorecard)

Maldives; 190 all out (49.1 overs)	v	Singapore; 191/5 (47.5 overs)
Faiz Sammad 45; Anthon Ranggi 4/42 (? overs)		T. Ravichandran 65; Imad Ismail 2/43 (? overs)

Singapore won by 5 wickets
Perbadanan Kemajuan Negari Selangor, Kuala Lumpur

- Scorecard not complete

8 September 1996
(scorecard)

Papua New Guinea; 186/9 (50 overs)	v	United Arab Emirates; 184/7 (41.1 overs)
Vavine Pala 65; Arshad Laeeq 4/32 (? overs)		Arshad Laeeq 57; Tuku Raka 3/40 (? overs)

United Arab Emirates won by 3 wickets
Tenaga National Sports Complex, Kuala Lumpur
Player of the match: Arshad Laeeq (UAE)

- Scorecard not complete

10 September 1996
(scorecard)

Thailand; 36 all out (29 overs)	v	Malaysia; 37/1 (5.4 overs)
Shujaul Ansari 10; Marimuthu Muniandy 4/8 (8 overs)		Suresh Navaratnam 23*

Malaysia won by 9 wickets
Royal Military College, Sungai Besi

- Scorecard not complete

10 September 1996
(scorecard)

Maldives; 167 all out (46.3 overs)	v	United Arab Emirates; 171/2 (31.2 overs)
Abdullah Shafeeu 48; Mohammad Hyder 5/34 (? overs)		Azhar Saeed 100*

United Arab Emirates won by 8 wickets
Rubber Research Institute, Kuala Lumpur

- Scorecard not complete

10 September 1996
(scorecard)

Papua New Guinea; 178/5 (40.1 overs)	v	Singapore; 85/9 (25 overs)
Vai Kevau 55; H. Rasheed 2/11 (? overs)		Kiran Deshpande 20; Rarua Ipi 4/15 (? overs)

Papua New Guinea won on faster scoring rate
Tenaga National Sports Complex, Kuala Lumpur
Player of the match: Ipi Morea (Papua New Guinea)

- Papua New Guinea innings reduced to 40.1 overs, Singapore target was 129 runs in 25 overs. Scorecard not complete.

11 September 1996
(scorecard)

Malaysia; 296/7 (50 overs)	v	Singapore; 143/9 (50 overs)
Suresh Navaratnam 67; Dinesh Chelvathurai 4/51 (? overs)		Graham Wilson 38; Jeevandran Nair 5/22 (? overs)

Malaysia won by 153 runs
Rubber Research Institute, Kuala Lumpur
Player of the match: Suresh Navaratnam (Malaysia)

- Scorecard not complete

11 September 1996
(scorecard)

Maldives; 271/9 (50 overs)	v	Thailand; 114 all out (36.2 overs)
Ibrahim Hussain 87; Pradeep Gulati 3/43 (? overs)		Anil Tanwani 47; Mohamed Shahid 4/23 (? overs)

Maldives won by 157 runs
Perbadanan Kemajuan Negari Selangor, Kuala Lumpur

- Scorecard not complete

12 September 1996
(scorecard)

Maldives; 120 all out (46.5 overs)	v	Malaysia; 122/5 (35 overs)
Ahmed Kaleem 30; Marimuthu Muniandy 4/26 (? overs)		Suresh Singh 65; Mohamed Shahid 3/35 (? overs)

Malaysia won by 5 wickets
Rubber Research Institute, Kuala Lumpur

- Scorecard not complete

12 September 1996
(scorecard)

Thailand; 92 all out (45 overs)	v	Papua New Guinea; 94/4 (13.1 overs)
Mustaq Ahmed 37; Noel Kariko 5/9 (? overs)		James Maha 45

Papua New Guinea won by 6 wickets
Kelab Aman, Kuala Lumpur

- Scorecard not complete

12 September 1996
(scorecard)

United Arab Emirates; 304/9 (50 overs)	v	Singapore; 143/8 (50 overs)
Azhar Saeed 79; Shehzad Haque 3/36 (? overs)		Thaiyar Mohamed 55; Asim Saeed 4/20 (? overs)

United Arab Emirates won by 161 runs
Tenaga National Sports Complex, Kuala Lumpur

- Scorecard not complete

== Semi-finals ==
13 September 1996
(scorecard)

Papua New Guinea; 134 all out (37.1 overs)	v	Bangladesh; 135/3 (30 overs)
Arua Uda 31 (61); Mohammad Rafique 3/10 (7.1 overs)		Habibul Bashar 45 (54); Vavine Pala 1/15 (7 overs)

Bangladesh won by 7 wickets
Tenaga National Sports Complex, Kuala Lumpur
Umpires: Shyam Bansal & Udaya Wickremasinghe
Player of the match: Aminul Islam (Bangladesh)

14 September 1996
(scorecard)

Fiji; 139 all out (36 overs)	v	United Arab Emirates; 140/5 (32.4 overs)
Taione Batina 35 (62); Azhar Saeed 4/16 (4 overs)		Saleem Raza 45 (35); Taione Batina 2/? (? overs)

United Arab Emirates won by 5 wickets
Tenaga National Sports Complex, Kuala Lumpur
Umpires: Shakoor Rana & Udaya Wickremasinghe
Player of the match: Azhar Saeed (UAE)

- Scorecard not complete

== Final ==
15 September 1996
(scorecard)

Bangladesh; 212 all out (49.3 overs)	v	United Arab Emirates; 104 all out (36.5 overs)
Shahriar Hossain 58 (96); Saleem Raza 3/31 (10 overs)		Arshad Laeeq 31*; Salahuddin Ahmed 3/13 (6 overs)

Bangladesh won by 108 runs
Tenaga National Sports Complex, Kuala Lumpur
Umpires: Shyam Bansal & Shakoor Rana
Player of the match: Khaled Mahmud (Bangladesh)

== Statistics ==
Most runs		Most wickets	
(Bangladesh) Shahriar Hossain	300	(United Arab Emirates) Azhar Saeed	14
(Bangladesh) Aminul Islam	257	(Hong Kong) Stewart Brew	14
(United Arab Emirates) Azhar Saeed	234	(Malaysia) Marimuthu Muniandy	13
(Fiji) Joji Bulabalavu	227	(United Arab Emirates) Saleem Raza	12
(Bangladesh) Habibul Bashar	219	(Bangladesh) Mohammad Rafique	12
