= Ireland Wolves cricket team in Nepal in 2023–24 =

International cricket tour

The Ireland Wolves cricket team toured Nepal in March and April 2024 to play three List A and three Twenty20 (T20) matches against a Nepal A side. Before those matches, the team played a two-match T20 series against the senior Nepal men's side. This was the first tour to Nepal by an Irish representative team. The tour also marked the first-ever T20 series played by Nepal A.

== Squads ==
Ireland Wolves	Nepal A		Nepal
List A & T20s	List A	T20s	T20s
Neil Rock (c, wk); Ross Adair; Cade Carmichael; Gareth Delany; Stephen Doheny (wk); Matthew Foster; Fionn Hand; Gavin Hoey; Matthew Humphreys; Thomas Mayes; Liam McCarthy; James McCollum; PJ Moor; Morgan Topping; Ben White	Binod Bhandari (c, wk); Basir Ahamad; Bikash Aagri; Kamal Singh Airee; Shahab Alam; Naren Bhatta; Mousom Dhakal; Rijan Dhakal; Arjun Kumal; Dev Khanal; Ranjit Kumar; Aarif Sheikh; Arjun Saud (wk); Bhim Sharki; Rupesh Singh	Binod Bhandari (c, wk); Basir Ahamad; Bikash Aagri; Kamal Singh Airee; Lokesh Bam; Hemant Dhami; Sagar Dhakal; Arjun Gharti; Bipin Khatri; Dev Khanal; Rashid Khan; Aarif Sheikh; Pawan Sarraf; Kiran Thagunna	Rohit Paudel (c); Dipendra Singh Airee; Abinash Bohara; Kushal Bhurtel; Aakash Chand; Pratis GC; Gulsan Jha; Sundeep Jora; Karan KC; Kushal Malla; Sompal Kami; Lalit Rajbanshi; Aasif Sheikh (wk); Anil Sah (wk); Bibek Yadav

== Nepal v Ireland Wolves series ==
Ireland Wolves cricket team in Nepal in 2023–24
	Nepal	Ireland Wolves
- Dates: 25 – 26 March 2024
Captains	Rohit Paudel	Neil Rock

Twenty20 International series
- Results: Nepal won the 2-match series 2–0
Most runs	Kushal Bhurtel (62)	Stephen Doheny (72)
Most wickets	Kushal Malla (4)	Ben White (3)

=== T20 series ===
==== 1st T20 ====
25 March 2024
13:00
Scorecard

Ireland Wolves; 121 (20 overs)	v	Nepal; 122/4 (16.1 overs)
Stephen Doheny 46 (39); Kushal Bhurtel 2/17 (3 overs)		Kushal Bhurtel 37* (32); Gareth Delany 2/28 (4 overs)

Nepal won by 6 wickets
Tribhuvan University International Cricket Ground, Kirtipur
Umpires: Vinay Kumar Jha (Nep) and Durga Subedi (Nep)
Player of the match: Kushal Bhurtel (Nep)

- Ireland Wolves won the toss and elected to bat.

==== 2nd T20 ====
26 March 2024
13:00
Scorecard

Nepal; 198/7 (20 overs)	v	Ireland Wolves; 127 (18.3 overs)
Gulsan Jha 46 (32); Matthew Foster 3/42 (4 overs)		Stephen Doheny 26 (13); Kushal Malla 3/15 (3 overs)

Nepal won by 71 runs
Tribhuvan University International Cricket Ground, Kirtipur
Umpires: Vinay Kumar Jha (Nep) and Durga Subedi (Nep)
Player of the match: Kushal Malla (Nep)

- Nepal won the toss and elected to bat.
- Sompal Kami (Nep) took his first hat-trick in T20s.

== Nepal A v Ireland Wolves series ==
Ireland Wolves cricket team in Nepal in 2023–24
	Nepal A	Ireland Wolves
- Dates: 29 March – 7 April 2024
Captains	Binod Bhandari	Neil Rock

Twenty20 International series
- Results: Ireland Wolves won the 3-match series 2–1
Most runs	Aarif Sheikh (156)	PJ Moor (127)
Most wickets	Kamal Singh Airee (5)	Fionn Hand (7)
- Player of the series: Fionn Hand (Ireland Wolves)

LA series
- Result: Ireland Wolves won the 3-match series 3–0
Most runs	Arjun Kumal (111)	Stephen Doheny (121)
Most wickets	Rijan Dhakal (7)	Matthew Humphreys (11)
- Player of the series: Matthew Humphreys (Ireland Wolves)

=== T20 series ===
==== 1st T20 ====
29 March 2024
13:00
Scorecard

Ireland Wolves; 222/5 (20 overs)	v	Nepal A 201 (19.3 overs)
PJ Moor 49 (32); Kamal Singh Airee 3/39 (4 overs)		Lokesh Bam 106 (56); Matthew Humphreys 3/26 (3 overs)

Ireland Wolves won by 21 runs
Tribhuvan University International Cricket Ground, Kirtipur
Umpires: Basu Karn (Nep) and Adhip Pradhan (Nep)
Player of the match: Lokesh Bam (Nepal A)

- Nepal A won the toss and elected to field.
- Hemant Dhami, Arjun Gharti, Dev Khanal and Kiran Thagunna (Nepal A) all made their T20 debuts.
- Lokesh Bam (Nepal A) scored his first century in T20s.

==== 2nd T20 ====
30 March 2024
13:00
Scorecard

Ireland Wolves; 224/6 (20 overs)	v	Nepal A 184 (17.5 overs)
Neil Rock 71* (34); Sagar Dhakal 3/33 (4 overs)		Dev Khanal 47 (25); Ben White 3/29 (4 overs)

Ireland Wolves won by 40 runs
Tribhuvan University International Cricket Ground, Kirtipur
Umpires: Basu Karn (Nep) and Adhip Pradhan (Nep)
Player of the match: Neil Rock (Ireland Wolves)

- Nepal A won the toss and elected to field.
- Bipin Khatri (Nepal A) made his T20 debut.

==== 3rd T20 ====
1 April 2024
13:00
Scorecard

Nepal A 213/7 (20 overs)	v	Ireland Wolves; 210/7 (20 overs)
Aarif Sheikh 93* (48); Fionn Hand 2/41 (4 overs)		Gareth Delany 68 (37); Bipin Khatri 3/23 (4 overs)

Nepal A won by 3 runs
Tribhuvan University International Cricket Ground, Kirtipur
Umpires: Basu Karn (Nep) and Adhip Pradhan (Nep)
Player of the match: Aarif Sheikh (Nepal A)

- Ireland Wolves won the toss and elected to field.
- Narayan Joshi (Nepal A) made his T20 debut.

=== List A series ===
==== 1st List A match ====
3 April 2024
09:30
Scorecard

Ireland Wolves; 157 (38.3 overs)	v	Nepal A 136 (25.3 overs)
Cade Carmichael 51 (77); Kamal Singh Airee 4/21 (6.3 overs)		Shahab Alam 37 (34); Matthew Humphreys 5/32 (10 overs)

Ireland Wolves won by 21 runs
Tribhuvan University International Cricket Ground, Kirtipur
Umpires: Himal Giri (Nep) and Ram Pandey (Nep)
Player of the match: Matthew Humphreys (Ireland Wolves)

- Ireland Wolves won the toss and elected to bat.
- Shahab Alam and Arjun Kumal (Nepal A) both made their List A debuts.
- Kamal Singh Airee (Nepal A) took his first hat-trick in List A cricket.
- Matthew Humphreys (Ireland Wolves) took his first five-wicket haul in List A cricket.

==== 2nd List A match ====
5 April 2024
09:30
Scorecard

Ireland Wolves; 174 (38.4 overs)	v	Nepal A 60 (16.5 overs)
Gavin Hoey 50 (59); Shahab Alam 3/35 (10 overs)		Bhim Sharki 17 (21); Matthew Humphreys 6/8 (4.5 overs)

Ireland Wolves won by 114 runs
Tribhuvan University International Cricket Ground, Kirtipur
Umpires: Ram Pandey (Nep) and Ujjwal Regmi (Nep)
Player of the match: Matthew Humphreys (Ireland Wolves)

- Nepal A won the toss and elected to field.
- Naren Bhatta (Nepal A) made his List A debut.
- Neil Rock (Ireland Wolves) scored his 1,000th run in List A cricket.

==== 3rd List A match ====
7 April 2024
09:30
Scorecard

Ireland Wolves; 284/9 (50 overs)	v	Nepal A 215 (39.4 overs)
Stephen Doheny 107 (129); Ranjit Kumar 3/51 (10 overs)		Arjun Kumal 102 (118); Ben White 5/62 (10 overs)

Ireland Wolves won by 69 runs
Tribhuvan University International Cricket Ground, Kirtipur
Umpires: Himal Giri (Nep) and Ujjwal Regmi (Nep)
Player of the match: Stephen Doheny (Ireland Wolves)

- Ireland Wolves won the toss and elected to bat.
- Bikash Aagri, Ranjit Kumar and Rupesh Singh (Nepal A) all made their List A debuts.
- Stephen Doheny (Ireland Wolves) scored his first century in List A cricket.
- Arjun Kumal (Nepal A) scored his first century in List A cricket.
- Ben White (Ireland Wolves) took his first five-wicket haul in List A cricket.
