= Manish Raj Pandey =

Former Nepalese cricketer

Manish Raj Pandey मनिष राज पाण्डे
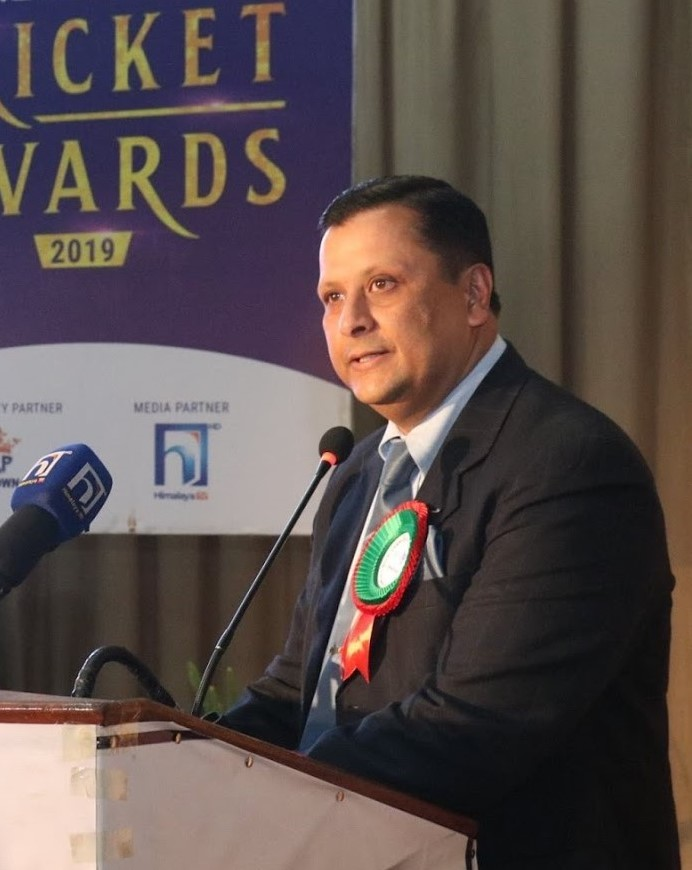
- Pandey speaking at the CPAN Cricket Awards, 2019

Personal information
- Full name: Manish Raj Pandey
- Born: 5 December 1970 (age 55); Biratnagar, Nepal
- Batting: Right-handed
- Bowling: Right-arm medium-fast
- Role: All-rounder

International information
- National side: Nepal (1996)

Manish Raj Pandey (Nepali: मनिष राज पाण्डे; born 5 December 1970) is a Nepalese conservationist, cricket administrator and former cricketer. He is the president of the Cricket Players' Association Nepal since 2018 and president of the Bhaktapur District Cricket Association since August 2023.

All-rounder Pandey played as a right-handed opening batsman and a right-arm medium-fast bowler. He made his debut for Nepal against Bangladesh in September 1996.

== Playing career ==
Born in Biratnagar, Pandey actively participated in national level cricket championships as a regular player representing Koshi zone and Morang district from 1988 to 2000. He also successfully led Morang district and Youth Cricket Club, Biratnagar teams as a captain.

Pandey was part of the playing XI in Nepal's first ever official international match during the 1996 Asian Cricket Council (ACC) Trophy in Kuala Lumpur, against Bangladesh, on 6 September 1996. Nepal finished fourth out of six teams in their first round group in this competition, beating Japan and Brunei. Pandey, with his opening partner Pawan Agarwal at the other end, faced Nepal's first ever delivery in international cricket. He took one wicket, returning figures of 1/31 in 8 overs in his debut match and scored 13 runs including the first ever six hit by a Nepalese batsman, with a flick over deep backward square leg.

Pandey became the first ever Nepalese cricketer to receive a player of the match award in an international cricket match, when he hit 27 runs and took 1 wicket against Japan on 7 September 1996. His best bowling performance was 3/22 against Brunei on 11 September 1996. He took 5 wickets during the 1996 ACC Trophy.

== Post-playing career ==
Pandey currently serves as the president of the Cricket Players' Association Nepal (CPAN) since March 2018. On 10 August 2023, he was elected president of the Bhaktapur District Cricket Association.

Outside cricket, Pandey works as a conservationist with the National Trust for Nature Conservation, where, as Acting Director, he heads the Department of Climate Change. He also holds a Ph.D. degree in Natural Science.
