= Nepal A cricket team =

Second-tier national team

Nepal "A"
- नेपाली क क्रिकेट टोली
- Nickname: The Rhinos
- Association: Cricket Association of Nepal

Personnel
- One Day captain: Anil Kumar Sah
- T20I captain: Anil Kumar Sah
- Coach: Raju Basyant

Team information
- Founded: 2024
- Home ground: Mulpani International Cricket Ground
- Capacity: 5,000
- Secondary home ground: Tribhuvan University International Cricket Ground
- Secondary ground capacity: 25,000

History
- List A debut: v. Ireland Wolves at Tribhuvan University International Cricket Ground, Kirtipur; 1 April 2024
- Twenty20 debut: v. Ireland Wolves at Tribhuvan University International Cricket Ground, Kirtipur; 29 March 2024
- Official website: https://cricketnepal.org.np
ODI kit
- As of 14 February 2024

Nepal national cricket teams
Women's	Men's	Men's A	Women's U19	Men's U19	Blind Men's

The Nepal A cricket team (Nepali: नेपाल ए क्रिकेट टिम) is a national-level men's cricket team of Nepal that functions as the second-tier team relative to the senior Nepal national cricket team.

Matches played by Nepal A are eligible for first-class and List A classification depending on the opposition; however, they do not carry Test matches or One Day International (ODI) status. Functioning primarily as a developmental squad, domestic players are typically expected to earn selection for the 'A' team to gain international exposure before progressing to the senior national side.

== History ==
The team was announced by Cricket Association of Nepal secretary Paras Khadka on 4 January 2024. The first representative game played by Nepal A was against Canada in February 2024. The squad for that series was announced on 14 February 2024. Nepal A played their first official List A cricket match against Ireland Wolves during the Nepal tour of Ireland Wolves in late March 2024.

== Current squad ==
The Players marked with bold selected for upcoming matches.

Name	Age	Batting style	Bowling style	forms	Domestic team	NPL
Batters
Arjun Kumal	20	Right-handed	—N/a	List A	Gandaki Province	Pokhara Avengers
Dev Khanal	21	Right-handed	—N/a	List A	Lumbini Province	Chitwan Rhinos
Mayan Yadav	20	Right-handed	—N/a	List A	Madhesh Province	Janakpur Bolts
Trit Raj Das	24	Right-handed	—N/a	List A	Nepal Army Club	Janakpur bolts
Shubh Kansakar	26	Right-handed	—N/a	List A, T20	Bagmati Province	karnali yaks
All-rounders
Basir Ahamad	23	Left-handed	Slow left-arm orthodox	List A	Nepal Army Club	Biratnagar Kings
Pawan Sarraf	25	Right-handed	Right-arm offbreak	T20	Madhesh Province	Karnali Yaks
Rupesh Singh	26	Right-handed	Right-arm Fast medium	T20	Madhesh Province	Janakpur Bolts
Narayan Joshi	25	Right-handed	Right-arm medium	List A	Sudurpashchim Province	Biratnagar Kings
Santosh Yadav	20	Left-handed	Slow left-arm orthodox	List A, T20	Lumbini Province	Kathmandu Gorkhas
Wicket-keepers
Anil Kumar Sah(c)	28	Right-handed	—N/a	List A, T20	Madhesh Province	Janakpur Bolts
Arjun Saud	23	Right-handed	—N/a	List A	Nepal Army Club	Chitwan Rhinos
Arjun Gharti	23	Right-handed	—N/a	T20	Karnali Province	Pokhara Avengers
Spin bowlers
Lalit Rajbanshi	27	Right-handed	Slow left-arm orthodox	List A	Nepal Police Club	Janakpur Bolts
Sher Malla	23	Left-handed	Right-arm offbreak	List A, T20	Sudurpashchim Province	Lumbini Lions
Shahab Alam	25	Left-handed	Slow left-arm orthodox	List A, T20	Nepal Army Club	Kathmandu Gorkhas
Sagar Dhakal	24	Right-handed	Slow left-arm orthodox	List A, T20	Nepal Police Club	Pokhara Avengers
Yuvaraj Khatri	19	Right-handed	Right-arm Leg-break	List A, T20	APF Club	Karnali Yaks
Pace bowlers
Rashid Khan	25	Right-handed	Right-arm medium	List A, T20	Nepal Police Club	Kathmandu Gorkhas
Hemant Dhami	20	Right-handed	Right-arm medium	List A, T20	Sudurpashchim Province	Sudurpaschim Royals
Aakash Chand	21	Right-handed	Right-arm medium	List A, T20	Nepal Army Club	Pokhara Avengers

As of 24 May 2026

== Coaching staff ==
Position	Name
Cricket manager	Binod Das
Head coach	Raju Basnyat

== Results summary ==
Key
More wins
Equal wins/losses ratio
More losses

Matches		First-class matches			List A matches			T20 matches			Other matches			Ref(s)
Date	Opponent	W	L	D	W	L	D	W	L	NR/T	W	L	NR/T	Ref(s)
18-22 February 2024	vs Canada XI	–	–	–	–	–	–	–	–	–	1	2	0	
29 March-07 April 2024	vs Ireland Wolves	–	–	–	0	3	0	1	2	0	–	–	–	
26 August- 3 September 2025	vs Assam	–	–	–	–	–	–	–	–	–	3	2	0	
22 – 24 April 2026	vs Oman	–	–	–	–	–	–	–	–	–	1	1	0	
06 – 09 May 2026	vs Scotland	–	–	–	–	–	–	–	–	–	2	0	0	
07 – 11 May 2026	vs USA	–	–	–	–	–	–	–	–	–	2	0	0	

- Source: ESPNcricinfo

=== Canada in Nepal, 2023–24 ===
After the ODI series, the Canadian team played three unofficial one-day matches against Nepal A. The visitors won this unofficial series 2–1.

=== Ireland Wolves in Nepal, 2023–24 ===
The Ireland Wolves cricket team toured Nepal in March and April 2024 to play three List A and three Twenty20 (T20) matches against a Nepal A team. Before those matches, the team played a two-match T20 series against the senior Nepal men's team. This was the first tour to Nepal by an Irish representative team. The tour also marked the first-ever T20 series played by Nepal A.

=== Nepal A tour of Assam 2025 ===
Nepal A toured Guwahati for a five‑match T20 series against Assam from August 28 to September 1, 2025 .

The first two matches were daytime games at the ACA Cricket Academy Ground, while the last three were day/night fixtures at the ACA Stadium (Barsapara Cricket Stadium) .

== See also ==
- Nepal national cricket team
- Nepal national under-19 cricket team
