= Mosharraf Hossain =

Mosharraf Hossain (or variants) is a masculine given name of Arabic origin. Notable people with the name include:

== People ==
- Mosharraf Hossain (Bangladesh politician, died 2014) (1940–2014), Bangladeshi politician
- Mosharraf Hossain (Bogra politician), Bangladeshi politician
- Mosharraf Hossain (boxer), Bangladeshi boxer
- Mosharraf Hossain (cricketer) (1981–2022), Bangladeshi cricketer
- Mosharraf Hossain (Jessore politician) (1925–1974), Bangladeshi lawyer and politician
- Mosharraf Hossain (Lakshmipur politician) (1947/48–2026), Bangladeshi politician
- Mosharraf Hossain (lawyer) (1935–1999), Bangladeshi advocate, politician, and freedom fighter
- Mosharraf Hossain (Netrokona politician), (1942–2010), Bangladeshi politician
- Mosharraf Hossain (politician, born 1943) (1943–2026), engineer and Housing Minister of Bangladesh
- Mosharraf Hossain Khan, Bangladeshi swimmer
- Mosharraf Hossain Mongu, Bangladeshi politician from Barisal
- Mosharraf Hossain Shahjahan (1939–2012), Bangladeshi politician
- Mosharrof Hossain (born 1978), Bangladeshi kabaddi player
- Musharraf Hussain (born 1958), British-Pakistani religious scholar
- M. H. Khan (Musharraf Husain Khan, 1932–2018), Bangladeshi Navy chief
- Musharrof Husain Khan (born 1933), Bangladeshi academic
- AK Mosharraf Hossain Akand, Bangladeshi politician
- A. K. M. Mosharraf Hossain (1937–2020), Bangladesh politician and former state minister of energy
- Kazi Musharraf Hussain (1871–1966), Indian nawab and politician
- Khandaker Mosharraf Hossain (born 1942) (born 1942), Bangladeshi politician
- Khandaker Mosharraf Hossain (born 1946) (born 1946), Bangladeshi politician
- M Musharraf Hossain Bhuiyan (born 1956), Bangladeshi politician
- Md Mosharraf Hossain Bhuiyan (born 1957), Bangladeshi ambassador and former chairman of the National Board of Revenue
- Mir Mosharraf Hossain (1847–1912), Bengali novelist and playwright
- Mohammad Mosharraf Hossain (disambiguation), multiple people
- Sardar Mosharraf Hossain (1927–2017), Bangladeshi advocate, politician, and freedom fighter
- Sheikh Mosharraf Hossain, Bangladeshi politician

== See also ==
- Musharraf (name)
- Hussain
