= Mohammad Mosharraf Hossain =

Mohammad Mosharraf Hossain may refer to:

- Mohammad Mosharraf Hossain (doctor)
- Muhammad Mosharraf Hossain (politician)
- Mohammed Mosharref Hossain
- Mosharraf Hossain (Bogra politician)
- Md Mosharraf Hossain Bhuiyan

== See also ==
- Mosharraf Hossain (disambiguation)
- Mohammad Hossain, Indian politician
