= Dev Khanal =

Nepalese cricketer

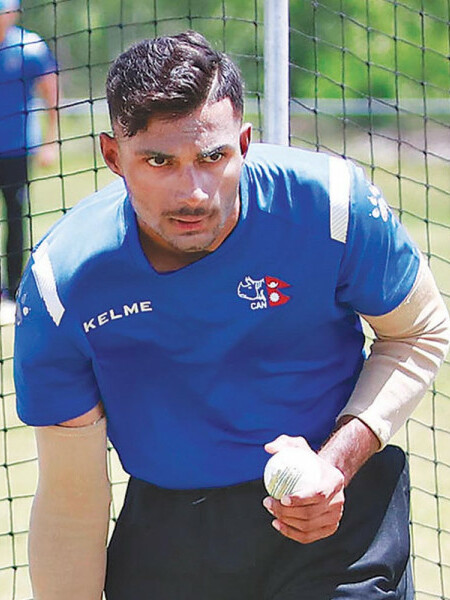

Personal information
- Born: 29 May 2005 (age 21); Dhakawang, Arghakhanchi District
- Batting: Right-handed
- Bowling: Right-arm offbreak
- Role: Batsman

International information
- National side: Nepal (2022–present)
- ODI debut (cap 30): 25 March 2022 v PNG
- Last ODI: 21 February 2024 v Namibia
- ODI shirt no.: 18
- T20I debut (cap 48): 28 September 2024 v Canada
- Last T20I: 02 October 2024 v Oman
- T20I shirt no.: 18

Domestic team information
- Years: Team
- 2021-present: Lumbini Province
- 2024: Karnali Yaks
- 2025-present: Chitwan Rhinos

Career statistics
Competition	ODI	List A	T20I
Matches	14	19	3
Runs scored	329	405	31
Batting average	27.41	23.82	10.33
100s/50s	0/3	0/3	0/0
Top score	76	76	18
Catches/stumpings	9/-	9/-	2/-
- Source: Cricinfo, 23 April 2026

Dev Khanal (born 29 May 2005) is a Nepalese cricketer and former captain of the Nepal national under-19 cricket team.

== Career ==
Khanal made his One Day International (ODI) debut for Nepal against Papua New Guinea in Kirtipur on 25 March 2022.

He was the captain of the Nepal u-19 Team to secure the spot at super 6 in the 2024 Under-19 Cricket World Cup. He was called for the national team after his brilliant performance in the U-19 World cup to play the ODI matches against the first-time visitors Canada. In the second ODI, he scored 76 off 81 balls, building a good partnership with captain Rohit Paudel to help Nepal secure the match, and clinch the series in the process. In March 2024, he was named in Nepal A's squad for their series against Ireland Wolves. He made his Twenty20 debut for Nepal A on 29 March 2024, against Ireland Wolves.

== See also ==
- Nepal A cricket team
- Nepal cricket team
