= Azhar Saeed =

Pakistani cricketer (born 1970)

Personal information
- Born: 25 December 1970 (age 55); Lahore, Punjab, Pakistan
- Batting: Left-handed
- Bowling: Slow left-arm orthodox
- Role: All-rounder, opening batsman

Career statistics
Competition	ODI
Matches	7
Runs scored	61
Batting average	8.71
100s/50s	0/0
Top score	32
Balls bowled	271
Wickets	6
Bowling average	35.50
5 wickets in innings	0
10 wickets in match	0
Best bowling	3/45
Catches/stumpings	2/–
- Source: CricInfo, 15 August 2022

Syed Azhar Saeed (born 25 December 1970) is a Pakistani-born former cricketer who played for the United Arab Emirates national cricket team. Azhar Saeed played five first-class cricket games for Lahore City Whites and Lahore City from 1984–85 to 1987–88 before later emigrating to the Emirates, which he first represented in the 1994 ICC Trophy, where he was named joint man-of-the-tournament.

Azhar Saeed is an all-rounder who opened the UAE batting. He played seven One Day Internationals for the UAE in the 1993–94 Pepsi Austral-Asia Cup and 1996 Cricket World Cup. His final international appearances were in the 1997 ICC Trophy.
