= Suresh Singh =

Malaysian cricketer (born 1973)

Personal information
- Born: 27 September 1973 (age 53); Labuan, Malaysia
- Batting: Right-handed
- Bowling: Right-arm medium

Career statistics
Competition	List A	ICC Trophy
Matches	2	6
Runs scored	5	51
Batting average	2.50	13.33
100s/50s	0/0	0/0
Top score	4	13.33
Balls bowled	1	12
Wickets	0	0
Bowling average	–	–
5 wickets in innings	–	–
10 wickets in match	–	–
Best bowling	–	–
Catches/stumpings	0/–	4/–
- Source: CricketArchive, 18 January 2008

Suresh Singh (Punjabi: ਸੁਰੇਸ਼ ਸਿੰਘ, romanized: Surēśa sigha; born 27 September 1973) is a Malaysian cricketer. A right-handed batsman and right-arm medium pace bowler, he has played for the Malaysia national cricket team since 1995.

== Biography ==
Born in Labuan in 1973, Suresh Singh made his debut for Malaysia in September 1995, playing in the annual Saudara Cup match against Singapore. He played in the fixture again in 1996, a year in which he played in the Stan Nagaiah Trophy series for the first time. He also played in the series in 1997 and 1998.

He played in the 1997 ICC Trophy in Kuala Lumpur and made his List A debut in March 1998, playing two matches for Malaysia in the Wills Cup, a Pakistani domestic one-day competition. He also played in the ACC Trophy in Nepal later in the year.

He was then absent from the Malaysian side until 2001, when he returned for that year's Stan Nagaiah Trophy. He also played in the 2001 ICC Trophy in Ontario. He played for Malaysia in a match against the ECB National Academy in February 2003, playing one match in the Stan Nagaiah Trophy series the following month. His next match for Malaysia wasn't until December 2006, when he played the Saudara Cup match against Singapore. He has not played for Malaysia since.
