= Musharraf (name) =

Musharraf, Mosharraf, Mosharrof, Musharrif or Mosharafa is a given name and surname of Arabic origin. Notable people with the name include:

== Given name ==
- Mosharaf Chowdhury, Bangladeshi-American computer scientist
- Musharrif al-Dawla (1003–1025), Buyid amir of Iraq
- Musharraf Ali Farooqi (born 1968), Pakistani-Canadian writer
- Mosharraf Hossain (disambiguation), multiple people
- Mosharraf Karim (born 1971), Bangladeshi actor
- Musharraf Karim (1946–2020), Bangladeshi writer and journalist
- Musharaff Moulamia Khan (1895–1967), Sufi musician
- Musharraf Al-Ruwaili (born 1985), Saudi football player
- Mosharraf Zaidi, Pakistani columnist and journalist

== Surname ==
- Ali Moustafa Mosharafa (1898–1950), Egyptian theoretical physicist
- Khaled Mosharraf (1937–1975), Bangladeshi military officer
- Pervez Musharraf (1943–2023), former President of Pakistan
- Raja Musharraf, a fictional Pakistani exchange student character in the American television series Aliens in America
