= Nepal national cricket team =

National men's cricket team of Nepal

Nepal
- Nicknames: The Rhinos; Cardiac Kids
- Association: Cricket Association of Nepal

Personnel
- One Day captain: Sandeep Lamichhane
- T20I captain: Dipendra Singh Airee
- Coach: Stuart Law

International Cricket Council
- ICC status: Associate member (1996)
- ICC region: Asia
ICC Rankings	Current	Best-ever
ODI	17th	14th (2 May 2019)
T20I	14th	11th (2 May 2019)

One Day Internationals
- First ODI: v Netherlands at VRA Cricket Ground, Amstelveen; 1 August 2018
- Last ODI: v United Arab Emirates at UDST Cricket Ground, Doha; 22 November 2026
ODIs	Played	Won/Lost
Total	100	50/47 (1 tie, 2 no results)
This year	19	12/7 (0 ties, 0 no results)
- World Cup Qualifier appearances: 4 (first in 2001)
- Best result: 8th (2018, 2023)

T20 Internationals
- First T20I: v Hong Kong at Zohur Ahmed Chowdhury Stadium, Chittagong; 16 March 2014
- Last T20I: v Japan at Kōrogi Sports Park, Nisshin; 26 September 2026
T20Is	Played	Won/Lost
Total	124	72/45 (3 ties, 4 no results)
This year	12	7/4 (0 ties, 1 no results)
- T20 World Cup appearances: 3 (first in 2014)
- Best result: Group stage (2014, 2024, 2026)
- T20 World Cup Qualifier appearances: 6 (Note: For the 2024 and 2026 Men's T20 World Cups, the final round of qualification in Asia was the ICC Asia Regional Final.) (first in 2012)
- Best result: Champions (2025)
- Official website: cricketnepal.org.np
ODI & T20I kit
- As of 22 November 2026

Nepal national cricket teams
Women's	Men's	Men's A	Women's U19	Men's U19

The Nepal men's national cricket team (Nepali: नेपाल पुरुष राष्ट्रिय क्रिकेट टोली) represents Nepal in men's International cricket and is governed by the Cricket Association of Nepal (CAN).They have been an Associate Member of the International Cricket Council (ICC) since 1996. Nepal were awarded Twenty20 International (T20I) status by the ICC in 2014 and earned One Day International (ODI) status in 2018.

Nepal has played 100 ODI matches, winning 50, losing 47, tying 1 and with 2 ending in a no-result. As of 22 November 2026, Nepal is ranked 17th in the ICC ODI Championship on 31 rating points. Nepal has not qualified for any edition of the Cricket World Cup, however they have appeared in World Cup Qualifier 3 times.

The team has also played 124 Twenty20 International matches, winning 72, losing 45, tying 3 and with 4 ending in a no-result. As of 25 September 2026, Nepal is ranked 14th in the ICC T20I Championship on 181 rating points. Nepal has appeared in the ICC Men's T20 World Cup three times in 2014, 2024 and 2026. They have also appeared in the Asia Cup in 2023 and Asian Games in 2010, 2014 and 2022.

== History ==
=== Beginnings ===
According to the 1877 book, History of Nepal edited by Daniel Wright:

"Attempts have been made at various times by their tutors to get the young men to play cricket and other games, but such amusements are thought degrading".

Over time, cricket came to be considered a gentleman's sport, and involvement was limited mainly to the ruling Rana family and other members of the Nepali elite.

In 1946, the Cricket Association of Nepal was formed to promote cricket amongst the aristocracy. After the introduction of democracy through the Revolution of 1951, cricket began to spread to the rest of the population. In 1961, in an effort to promote cricket to the whole of Nepal, the Cricket Association of Nepal became part of the National Sports Council. Nevertheless, the National games tended to be limited to Kathmandu Valley until the 1980s.

=== ICC membership ===
Improvements to communications and transport infrastructure in Nepal allowed the game to expand outside Kathmandu in the 1980s and Nepal became an Affiliate Member of the International Cricket Council in 1988. A major development program was begun in the early 1990s, which saw regional and district tournaments being established and the increased promotion of cricket in schools.

The local population's interest in cricket increased quickly, and the demand to play was such that restrictions had to be placed on the number of teams in several tournaments until more facilities could be built in the mid-1990s. Nepal became an Associate Member of the International Cricket Council on February 2, 1996, which was the year the national team played for the first time in the 1996 ACC Trophy in Kuala Lumpur.

By 1998, the facilities in Nepal had improved sufficiently to allow them to host that year's ACC Trophy at grounds in Lalitpur and Kirtipur (at TU Cricket Ground) and Kathmandu.

Currently, the country has one of the best fan followings among ICC Associate Members. It lost for three years its governing body, the Cricket Association of Nepal (CAN) which was suspended by the International Cricket Council (ICC) due to unnecessary government interference in 2016, but it was reinstated in October 2019.

=== 21st century ===
==== 2000 – 2009 ====
In 2000, Nepal's youth development policy began to pay off when the Nepal national under-19 cricket team finished eighth in the Under-19 World Cup. The senior team had their best performance to date later in the year when they reached the semi-finals of the 2000 ACC Trophy before losing to Hong Kong at Sharjah. They competed in the ICC Trophy for the first time the following year. In the tournament in Ontario, they beat Germany and Gibraltar, but a loss to eventual runners-up Namibia prevented them from progressing past the first round.

Nepal were runners-up to the UAE in the 2002 ACC Trophy in Singapore and they hosted the ACC Emerging Nations Tournament in 2003, winning easily against Bhutan and the Maldives. They won so comprehensively that they were not invited back to the tournament the next time it was played in 2005. Raju Khadka became the first Nepalese cricketer to score an international century, when he slammed an unbeaten 105 off just 50 balls against Bhutan in the tournament.

Nepal played first-class cricket for the first time in 2004, playing in the ICC Intercontinental Cup against the UAE and Malaysia. They beat Malaysia, but drew with the UAE, failing to reach the semi-final stage. Nepal finished third in the 2004 ACC Fast Track Countries Tournament, which qualified them for the 2005 ICC Intercontinental Cup, and finished 5th in the 2004 ACC Trophy, which qualified them for the repêchage tournament of the 2005 ICC Trophy. They finished third in this tournament after beating Qatar in a play-off, meaning that they did not qualify for the 2005 ICC Trophy. Shakti Gauchan scored a century against Italy and stayed unbeaten on 106 off 103 balls in the tournament. They beat the UAE and drew with Hong Kong in the 2005 ICC Intercontinental Cup, but missed out on qualification for the semi-finals by half a point. They were runners-up to the UAE in the 2005 ACC Fast Track Countries Tournament.

In March 2006, Nepal played Namibia in Windhoek in a play-off match to decide the final team in the 2006 ICC Intercontinental Cup. Nepal needed to win outright to qualify for the main tournament, but the match was drawn after there was no play on the first day. Later in the year, they toured Pakistan, playing against the Pakistan Cricket Academy before playing in the 2006 ACC Trophy in Kuala Lumpur.

In the 2006 ACC Trophy, Nepal bowled Myanmar out for just 10 runs off 12.1 overs after winning the toss and sending Myanmar in; no batsman scored more than one, the innings included five ducks, with a top score of five extras (three leg byes and two wides). Mehboob Alam and Binod Das picked up seven and three wickets, respectively. In reply, Nepal hit three off the first ball, followed by three wides that went for five, and then hit another three from the second legitimate delivery to win by ten wickets. Some critics called it the greatest mismatch in the history of international cricket and the score of 10 is the lowest in any level of men's international cricket. They finished fourth in the tournament after losing to Afghanistan in a play-off. They won the ACC Premier League in 2006.

They played in the 2007 ACC Twenty20 Cup in Kuwait, where they finished fourth in their first round group.

In May 2008, Nepal traveled to Jersey to play in 2008 ICC World Cricket League Division Five of the World Cricket League. Mehboob Alam set the world record by taking all ten wickets in the match against Mozambique. He got his name in the Guinness World Records for this, becoming the first bowler to take all 10 wickets in an ICC international cricket match with limited overs. Nepal topped Group A after the group qualifying matches but lost to Afghanistan in the semi-final and finished third overall after defeating the USA in the playoff for third place. With only the top two from this tournament qualifying for 2008 ICC World Cricket League Division Four in Tanzania later in the year, Nepal missed out on the chance to take their 2011 World Cup dream any further. Later, Nepal appeared in the 2008 ACC Trophy Elite and finished fourth after losing to the UAE in the semi-final and to Afghanistan in the playoff for third place.

Nepal finished fifth in the 2009 ACC Twenty20 Cup after beating Singapore by 9 wickets in the playoff for fifth place. In a group match against Kuwait, Nepal needed 7 runs off the last ball to win. Binod Bhandari, making his debut for the national team, hit a last-ball six to tie the match. Eventually Nepal won the match in bowl-out.

==== 2010 – 2014 ====
Nepal won their first major tournament, beating USA in the final of 2010 ICC World Cricket League Division Five held at Kathmandu in February 2010. Sharad Vesawkar scored a century and stayed unbeaten on 105 off 134 balls against Fiji in the tournament. Nepal played very well in 2010 ACC Trophy Elite, winning all the matches in group stage and beating Malaysia in the semi-final by 8 runs but lost the final against an ODI team Afghanistan by 95 runs and finished runners-up. Nepal came third in 2010 ICC World Cricket League Division Four, thus remaining in Division Four for 2012 ICC World Cricket League Division Four. In November, Nepal appeared in 2010 Asian Games and lost against Sri Lanka in the quarter-final. It was the first match Nepal had played against a Full Member nation.

In December 2011, Nepal hosted the 2011 ACC Twenty20 Cup and finished fourth, thereby qualifying for the 2012 ICC World Twenty20 Qualifier.

Nepal faced Afghanistan in the 3 match T20I series and 5 match ODI series at the start of 2012 but Afghanistan defeated Nepal 3-0 in the T20I series and again defeated Nepal 5-0 in the ODI series.

Nepal finished seventh in the 2012 ICC World Twenty20 Qualifier after defeating Kenya and Papua New Guinea in play-offs. Shakti Gauchan took the first international hat-trick for Nepal against Denmark in the tournament. In September 2012, Nepal appeared in 2012 ICC World Cricket League Division Four, where Subash Khakurel and Anil Mandal each scored a century. Subash Khakurel scored 115 off 142 balls against United States and Anil Mandal scored 113 off 134 balls against Denmark. In a match against Malaysia, Shakti Gauchan set up Nepal's convincing victory with a new record. The left-arm orthodox spinner's figures of 10–8–2–3 is the best economical bowling spell ever in limited over encounters. Nepal won all the six matches of the tournament and progressed to 2013 ICC World Cricket League Division Three. Nepalese players won man of the match awards in all the six matches Nepal played and Basanta Regmi won the player of the tournament award after taking a total of 21 wickets in the tournament. In October, Nepal competed in 2012 ACC Trophy Elite and had to share the trophy with the UAE after a thrilling tied final in Sharjah Cricket Stadium, UAE on 12 October 2012. UAE posted 241, a target that looked in Nepal's sight after their 94-run opening stand. However, they lost wickets consistently, and eventually needed 12 off the last over with just two wickets in hand. Shakti Gauchan smacked Shadeep Silva's left-arm for a six, but could manage only one run off the last ball, hence ending a splendid final match in a tie. Skipper Paras Khadka scored an unbeaten 106 off just 77 balls against Kuwait, his maiden century for Nepal, in the tournament.

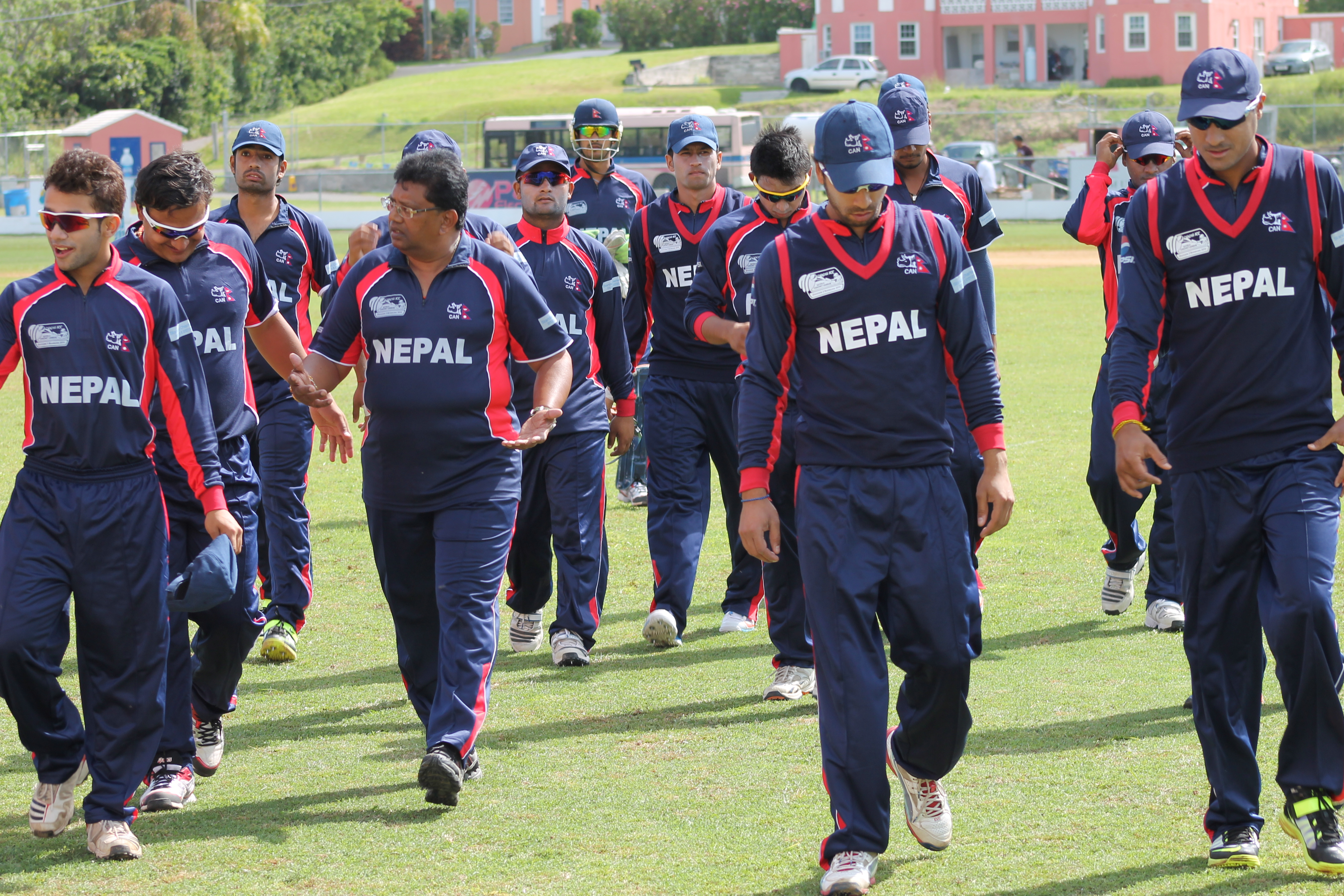
Nepal cricket team during the 2013 ICC World Cricket League Division Three in Bermuda

Nepal competed in 2013 ACC Twenty20 Cup held at home grounds in Kirtipur and Lalitpur. Nepal easily marched towards the final of the tournament with high class performance from their captain, Paras Khadka, and the team thrashed the UAE by 6 wickets. Nepal had earlier qualified for 2013 ICC World Twenty20 Qualifier, reaching the semi-final of the tournament. Nepal had to be satisfied with runners-up status after losing to an ODI team Afghanistan by 7 wickets. The Nepalese team was supported by a huge fan following throughout this tournament with an average turnout of 15,000 – 20,000 (about 25,000 in the semi-final and final) during their matches while hundreds of thousands watched live on television – undoubtedly the largest public support outside the Test-playing nations. Nepal won the 2013 ICC World Cricket League Division Three held in Bermuda and qualified for the 2014 World Cup Qualifier. Nepal also played in 2013 ACC Emerging Teams Cup, where under-23 age level teams of the four Test nations – Bangladesh, India, Pakistan and Sri Lanka took part along with the UAE, Afghanistan and the hosts Singapore. Nepal finished third in 2013 ICC World Twenty20 Qualifier held in UAE and qualified for the 2014 ICC World Twenty20, defeating Hong Kong off the last ball of the thrilling quarter-final.

=== T20I status and series ===
On 28 June 2014, the ICC awarded T20I status to Nepal, who took part and performed exceptionally well in the 2014 ICC World Twenty20. Nepal had already played three T20I matches before gaining the status, as the ICC had earlier announced that all matches at the 2014 ICC World Twenty20 would have T20I status.

16 March (D/N)

Nepal; 149/8 (20 overs)	v	Hong Kong; 69 (17 overs)
Gyanendra Malla 48 (41); Haseeb Amjad 3/25 (4 overs)		Babar Hayat 20 (25); Shakti Gauchan 3/9 (4 overs)

Nepal won by 80 runs
Zohur Ahmed Chowdhury Stadium, Chittagong

- First ever T20I match for Nepal

Nepal lost the status in July 2015, after failing to qualify for the 2016 ICC World Twenty20.

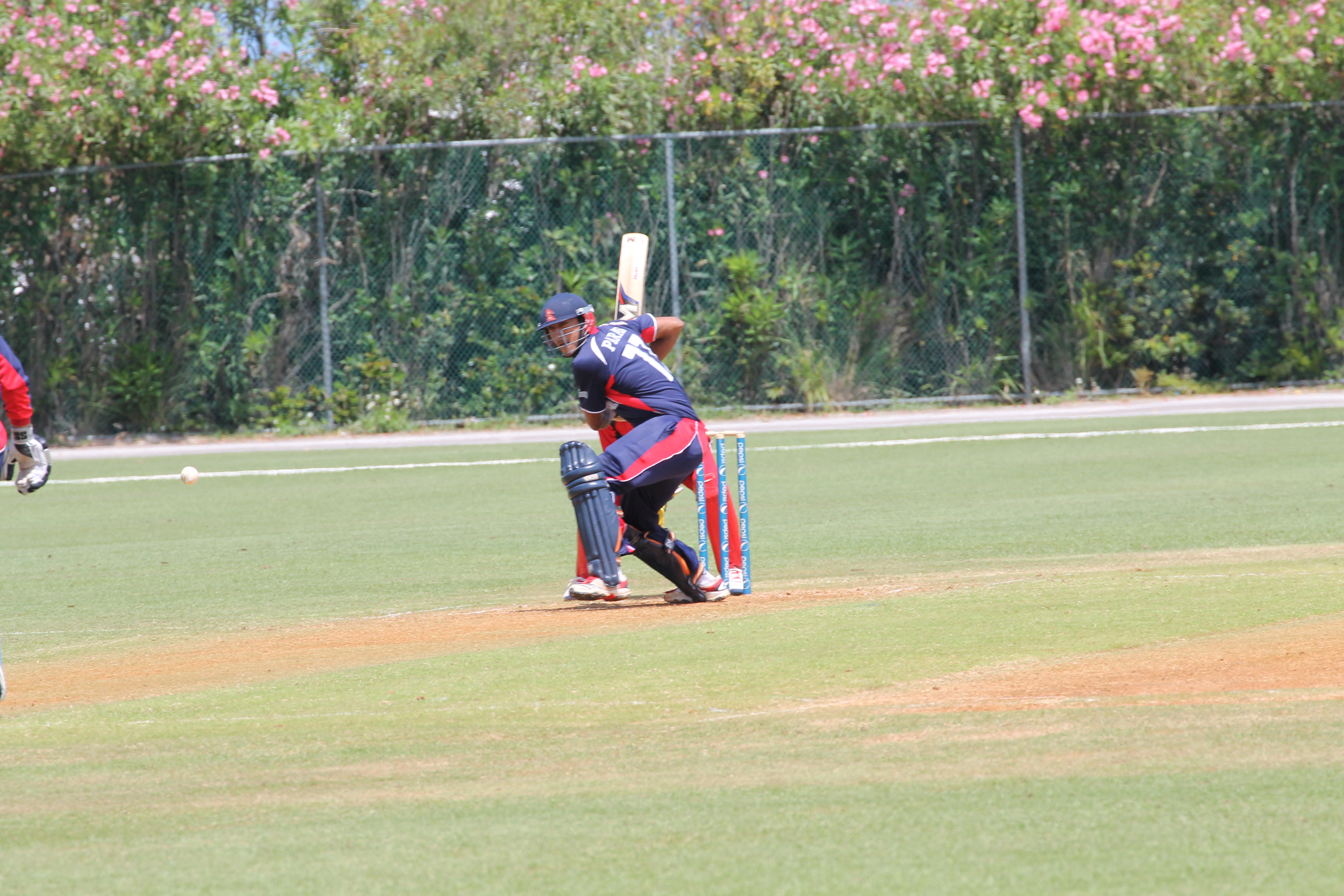
Captain Paras Khadka batting during the 2013 ICC World Cricket League Division Three

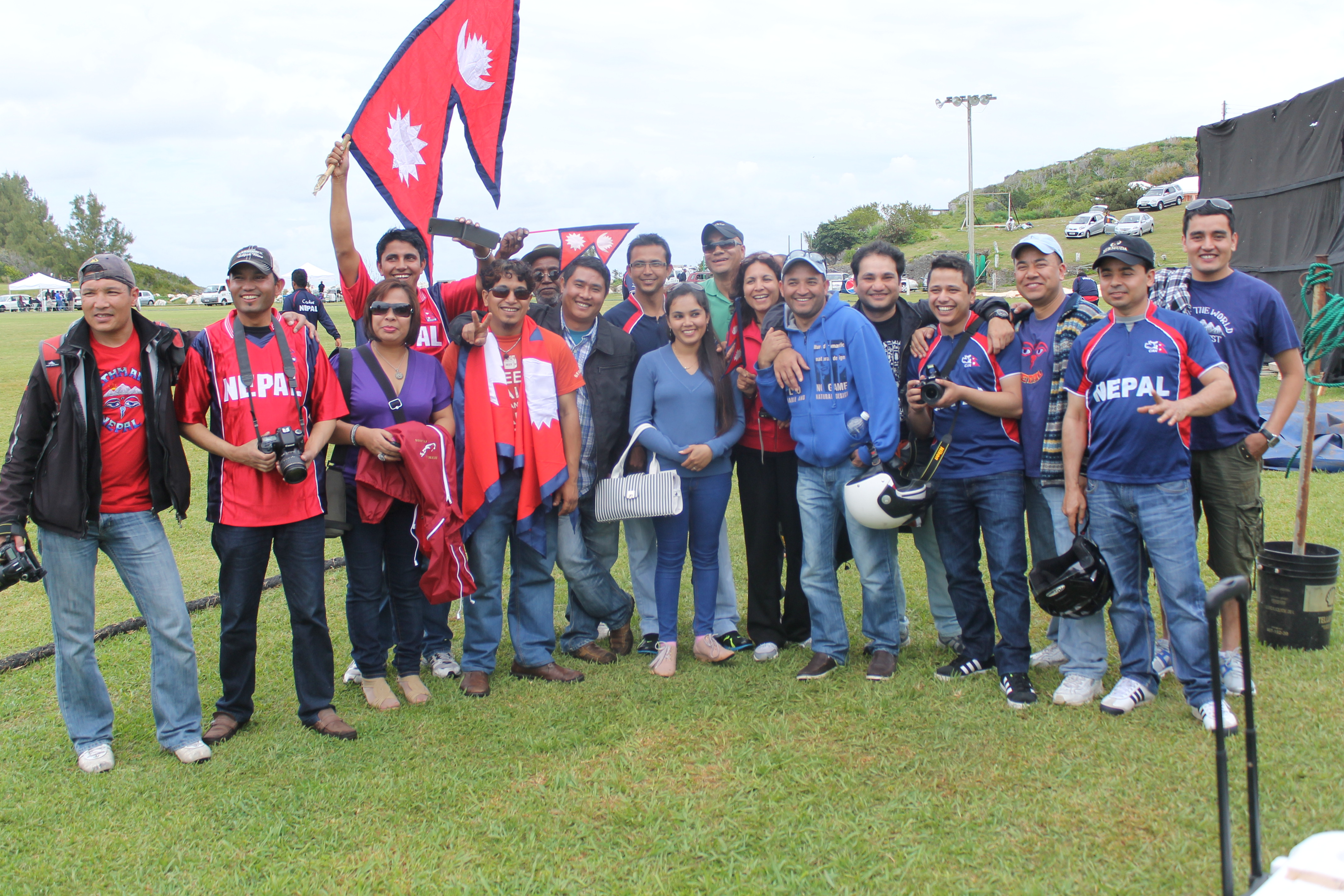
Nepal fans in Bermuda during the 2013 ICC World Cricket League Division Three

Nepal played their first ever Twenty20 International series against Hong Kong in November 2014 in Sri Lanka. Initially the series was scheduled for three matches but only one match was played because of continuous rain and poor ground conditions. Nepal lost the match but Sompal Kami put in an impressive performance by scoring 40 off 31 balls, coming in at No. 10. This was the world-record for the highest score made by a batsman at that position.

Nepal played their second Twenty20 International series against the Netherlands from 30 June to 3 July 2015. Nepal lost the 4 match series 3–1. Paras Khadka was named the player of the series.

Nepal missed out on qualification for the 2015 World Cup, finishing ninth in the 2014 World Cup Qualifier in New Zealand in January. Nepal were the best of the three associate teams on display in Group A of the 2014 ICC World Twenty20. They comprehensively beat Hong Kong, held their own with the bat against Bangladesh and pulled off a strong win against Afghanistan, their first since 2004 in any format against their old rivals. Nepal's bowlers did not bowl a single wide or no ball throughout the tournament. Nepal were also the only team to not concede 140 in an innings in the tournament. Nepal finished third in the 2014 ACC Premier League, where they beat ODI teams UAE and Hong Kong, and qualified for the 2014 ACC Championship. In September, Nepal participated in the 2014 Asian Games but failed to qualify beyond quarter-finals. Nepal won the 2014 ICC World Cricket League Division Three held in Malaysia and qualified for the 2015 ICC World Cricket League Division Two. Gyanendra Malla scored his maiden century, 114 off 125 balls, against Singapore in the tournament. In November, Nepal toured Sri Lanka, as Sri Lanka Cricket approved a request from the Asian Cricket Council to support the region's Non-Test playing countries, where they played two three-day matches against Sri Lanka Cricket Combined XI. and a Twenty20 International series against Hong Kong.

==== 2015 – 2019 ====
Nepal finished fourth in the 2015 ICC World Cricket League Division Two in Namibia and qualified for the 2015–17 ICC World Cricket League Championship. But Nepal failed to secure promotion to Division One and qualification to 2015–17 ICC Intercontinental Cup after finishing third in the round-robin stage. Basanta Regmi became the first bowler to take 100 wickets in the World Cricket League. He achieved this feat after taking 2 wickets against Netherlands in the tournament. On 11 April 2015, Nepal hosted a 63-over (31.3 overs per side) tribute match in honour of the Australian cricketer Phillip Hughes who was batting on 63 when he was struck by a bouncer. The match was played at the TU Cricket Ground, Kirtipur between Team Red, combined of players of Nepal and Australia and Team Blue, composed of all Nepalese players. In June, Nepal toured Netherlands to play a Twenty20 International series against the home team. Then Nepal appeared in the 2015 ICC World Twenty20 Qualifier held in Ireland and Scotland, where the team finished seventh in the Group A, thus failing to qualify for the second consecutive ICC World Twenty20.

Nepal finished second in 2018 ICC World Cricket League Division Two to earn a place in the 2018 Cricket World Cup Qualifier. On 15 March, Nepal claimed One Day International (ODI) status for the first time with their win over Papua New Guinea in the 2018 Cricket World Cup Qualifier 9th place play off encounter. Due to gaining ODI status, Nepal also regained Twenty20 International (T20I) status. After gaining ODI status, Nepal's captain at the Cricket World Cup Qualifier, Paras Khadka, said that they want to gain Test status, which he believes will take between eight and ten years to achieve.

1 August 2018
11:00
Scorecard

Netherlands; 189 (47.4 overs)	v	Nepal; 134 (41.5 overs)
Michael Rippon 51 (76); Paras Khadka 4/26 (10 overs)		Gyanendra Malla 51 (61); Pieter Seelaar 3/20 (9 overs)

Netherlands won by 55 runs
VRA Cricket Ground, Amstelveen
Umpires: Rizwan Akram (Ned) and Sarika Prasad (Sin)
Player of the match: Michael Rippon (Ned)

- Netherlands won the toss and elected to bat.
- First ever ODI match for Nepal

Nepal played their first 3 match ODI series against UAE and won 2–1, their first ODI series win. Paras Khadka became the first batsman to score an ODI century for Nepal. Sundeep Jora became the world's youngest player to score a half-century in T20I format, at the age of 17 years and 103 days. In October 2019, the Cricket Association of Nepal, which was suspended in 2016, was readmitted as an ICC member.

==== 2020 – 2022 ====
Nepal hosted United States and Oman in the fifth round of the 2019–2023 ICC Cricket World Cup League 2 in February 2020. Nepal won 2 games (1 each) out of 4 in the series. In the last match of the series, Nepal bowled out the United States for the joint-lowest total of 35 in ODI cricket. Kushal Malla (Nep) made his ODI debut, and at the age of 15 years and 340 days, he became the youngest male cricketer to score an international half-century while playing against the USA on February 8, 2020.

Nepal hosted the Netherlands and Malaysia in the 2020–21 Nepal Tri-Nation Series in April 2021. Nepal finished top in the points table winning three out of four group matches and qualified for the final, where they played against the Netherlands. Nepal comprehensively beat the Netherlands by 142 runs and won the series. Kushal Bhurtel, making his debut for Nepal, scored 278 runs in the series at an average of 69.50 and a strike rate of 140.40 and won the Player of the series award.

Nepal toured Oman in September 2021, to play two ODI matches against PNG. They won both matches comfortably, showcasing their skills and determination on the cricket field. In the first ODI, Nepal won by two wickets with 63 balls remaining. Sandeep Lamichhane won the man of the match award for his impressive bowling attack of 4/35 in his 10 overs, while Rohit Paudel scored the highest for Nepal with a steady knock of 41 off 65. In the second ODI, Nepal won by a whopping 151 runs with Sandeep Lamichhane again winning the man of the match award for his exceptional bowling of 6/11 in 5.1 overs. Aasif Sheikh, Kushal Bhurtel, Bikram Sob made ODI debut for Nepal in this series. The second ODI was the day/night match of the series.

Nepal then played 4 back-to-back day/night ODI in September 2021 against USA and Oman. it was the sixth round of the 2019–2023 ICC Cricket World Cup League 2. In the first match against the US, Kushal Bhurtel won the man of the match award with his score of 84 off 93 and 3 catches, helped Nepal beat USA by 5 wickets with 6 balls remaining. Nepal lost its second game of the series with Oman by 5 wickets even though Aasif Sheikh scored 90 off 112 in this match. Nepal lost its third game of the series as well, this time against the US by 6 wickets. Gulsan Jha made his ODI debut in the match. Nepal won its last match of the series against Oman by 7 wickets with 190 balls remaining. Karan Kc won the man of the match in the game for his bowling spell of 4/25.

In March 2022, Nepal toured UAE for the seventh round of the 2019–2023 ICC Cricket World Cup League 2 to play 2 games each against UAE and PNG. In the first match of the series against PNG, Nepal won by 2 wickets with 4 balls remaining. Rohit Paudel was the man of the match for his 60 off 83 balls. Sagar Dhakal made his ODI debut in the game. Nepal lost both of their 2nd and 3rd game against UAE by 48 and 99 runs respectively Nepal won its 4th game of the series against PNG by 7 wickets with 78 balls remaining. Aarif Sheikh was the man of the match for his all-round performance of 59* off 102 and 1/21 in his 10 overs.

Nepal toured the United States for the eighth round of the 2019–2023 ICC Cricket World Cup League 2 to play 2 games each against United States and Oman. In the first match of the series against Oman, Nepal lost by 13 runs despite the 5 wickets haul by Karan KC (5–38 in 10 overs). Sunil Dhamala made an ODI debut in this match. The second match against the USA was declared tied as both teams could not surpass 274 runs in the given 50 overs each. Dev Khanal made his half-century whereas Mohammad Aadil Alam made his ODI debut and took 3 wickets for the team. Nepal won its 3rd game with wide margin against Oman by 7 wickets with 101 balls remaining. Karan KC was the man of the match for his 5/33 in 9 overs whereas Aasif Sheikh(62) and Kushal Bhurtel(56) scored half-centuries and Sandeep Lamichhane got 3 wickets in the match. Nepal lost its last game of the series against the US by 39 runs despite Karan KC's 3-wicket-haul and Aarif Sheikh's 63 runs with the bat.

Nepal then travelled to the Scotland for the ninth round of the 2019–2023 ICC Cricket World Cup League 2 to play 2 games each against Scotland and Namibia in July 2022. Nepal lost its first game of the series against Namibia by 40 runs. Spinner Sandeep Lamichhane took 4 wickets and Aarif Sheikh scored 50 runs in the match. Basir Ahamad made an ODI debut for Nepal(Cap 33). Nepal beat the Scotland in the next game by 5 wickets with 149 balls remaining. Aasif Sheikh was the player of the match with his score of 71 off 62 balls whereas bowlers Sompal Kami and Mohammad Aadil Alam took 3 wickets each. The next game was against Namibia which they lost again by 63 runsSandeep Lamichhane's 4-wicket haul. Nepal lost its last game against the host Scotland as well by 8 wickets with 186 balls remaining. Fast Bowler Kishore Mahato made his ODI debut in the game(Cap 34).

In between the league 2 ODI games, Nepal toured Kenya to play 5 T20I against the host Kenya in August 2022. Nepal won the first game by 5 wickets with 4 balls remaining. Sompal Kami was the man of the match for his bowling spell of 3/22 in 4 overs. Kenya won the second T20I by 18 runs Basir Ahamad made T20I debut for Nepal in that match. Nepal won the third T20I by 4 wickets with 3 balls remaining. Gyanendra Malla was the player of the match for his 46 off 41 balls. Arjun Saud made T20I debut for Nepal in this match. Nepal lost the fourth match of the series by 7 runs despite Sandeep Lamichhane's maiden 5-wicket haul in T20I. Nepal won its final game of the series by 31 runs. Gyanendra Malla won the man of the match award for his knock of 59 off 44 balls. With the win, Nepal won the series 3-2 and Sandeep Lamichhane was named player of the series for his 12 wickets in 5 games.

The next tour was in December 2022 where Nepal travelled to Namibia for the tenth round of the 2019–2023 ICC Cricket World Cup League 2 to play 2 games each against Scotland and Namibia. The first game was declared no-result due to rain. Gyanendra Malla scored 75 off 94 balls for Nepal in the match and Opener Arjun Saud made his ODI debut for Nepal(Cap 35). In the second game, Nepal lost with Scotland by 3 wickets and 107 balls remaining. In the third game, Nepal lost against Namibia by 86 runs. Spinner Lalit Rajbanshi took 4 wickets in the game. In the fourth game of the series against Scotland, Nepal was all out for 119 runs in 36th over and lost the game pretty marginally by 8 wickets with 198 balls remaining.

==== 2023 - Present ====
In early February 2023, Nepal appointed Monty Desai of India as head coach ahead of a home series against Scotland and Namibia, part of the eleventh round of the ongoing World Cricket League 2 at Tribhuvan University International Cricket Ground in Kirtipur. Nepal won all four matches. Bhurtel scored a maiden ODI century against Namibia, Airee contributed an 85* all-round performance against Scotland, and Paudel scored 95 in a tense final-ball win over table-topping Scotland.

Nepal then travelled to Dubai for the twelfth round, facing UAE and Papua New Guinea. They won three of four matches, beating PNG twice and UAE once, with their only loss coming against UAE by 68 runs. In the thirteenth and final round, played at home, Nepal required 4 out 4 wins to directly qualify to 2023 Cricket World Cup Qualifier in Zimbabwe. Nepal beat PNG twice and UAE once, with the last match versus UAE remaining. Winning this match would secure third place, a feat considered nearly impossible before Desai took over as Head Coach. In the last match with the help of Asif Khan 41 ball 100, UAE posted 310 runs on board. Half-centuries from Bhim Sharki, Kushal Bhurtel, Aarif Sheikh, and Gulsan Jha took Nepal to 269/6 in 44 overs. The umpires ultimately called off the match due to fading light. With the DLS target set at 261, Nepal stood 9 runs ahead, securing a dramatic victory and their spot in the 2023 Cricket World Cup Qualifier. Nepal finished third out of seven teams, having won 11 of their last 12 matches.

16 March 2023
9:00
Scorecard

United Arab Emirates; 310/6 (50.0 overs)	v	Nepal; 269/6 (44 overs)
Asif Khan 101* (42); Dipendra Singh Airee 2/19 (8 overs)		Bhim Sharki 67 (76); Junaid Siddique 3/51 (10 overs)

Nepal won by 9 runs (D/L)
TU Cricket Ground, Kathmandu
Umpires: Buddhi Pradhan (NEP) and Raveendra Wimalasiri (SL)
Player of the match: Asif Khan (UAE)

- UAE won the toss and elected to bat.
- The game was called off at early due to poor lighting condition. DLS par score was 260

Nepal hosted the 2023 ACC Men's Premier Cup in April and May, which served as the Asia Cup qualification tournament. Kushal Malla struck the fastest ODI century by a Nepali batter, reaching three figures off 59 balls against Oman. In the same match, Lamichhane became the fastest bowler to 100 ODI wickets, reaching the mark in 42 matches, beating Rashid Khan's record of 44. After topping their group and defeating Kuwait in a rain-affected semi-final, Nepal faced UAE in the final. In a match interrupted by rain, Nepal restricted the UAE to 117, led by Lalit Rajbanshi's 4/14. They chased the target comfortably thanks to Jha's unbeaten 67. Despite heavy downpours, thousands of devoted Nepali fans remained at the stadium, gaining widespread international attention and praise. The victory confirmed Nepal's first-ever qualification for the Asia Cup.

At the 2023 Cricket World Cup Qualifier in Zimbabwe, Nepal's opening match against hosts Zimbabwe on June 18 was the first time Nepal played an ODI against a Full Member nation. Kushal Bhurtel scored 99 and Aasif Sheikh 66 in a record 171-run opening stand yet it wasn't enough as Zimbabwe won by eight wickets. Nepal beat USA in their second match, with Karan KC taking four wickets and Bhim Sharki scoring 77*. They lost to West Indies and Netherlands, failing to reach the Super Six and finishing eighth out of ten teams after also losing the seventh-place playoff final to Ireland.

Nepal played their first Asia Cup in August and September 2023, placed in Group A alongside India and Pakistan. In the opening match versus Pakistan at Multan Cricket Stadium, Pakistan posted a target of 343 with the help of Babar Azam and Iftikhar Ahmed century and Nepal were bowled out for 104 in 23.4 overs and lost by 238 runs. The second match at Pallekele was Nepal's first ever official match against India. The fixture was highly anticipated, drawing widespread attention across the subcontinent and regarded as a landmark moment for Nepali cricket. Nepal batted first and put up a competitive total. Aasif Sheikh top-scored with 58 off 97 balls and Sompal Kami struck 48 off 56 in the lower order as Nepal were dismissed for 230. In the rain affected match, India easily chased down the revised target of 145 run with the help of an unbroken 147-run opening stand from Rohit Sharma and Shubman Gill to win by ten wickets. Despite the loss, Nepal's performance drew praise from commentators and cricket observers, with Nepal widely noted as having given India a good fight. Nepal did not advance from the group stage, with Pakistan and India qualifying for the Super Fours.

4 September 2023
15:00 (D/N)

Nepal; 230/10 (50.0 overs)	v	India; 147/0 (20.1 overs)
Aasif Sheikh 58 (97); Ravindra Jadeja 3/40 (10 overs)		Rohit Sharma 74 (59)

India won by 10 wickets (D/L)
Pallekele Int'l Cricket Stadium, Pallekele
Umpires: Paul Wilson (AUS) and Ruchira Palliyaguruge (SL)
Player of the match: Rohit Sharma (IND)

- India won the toss and elected to field.
- DLS revised target was 145.

At the 2023 Asian Games in Hangzhou, Nepal posted 314/3 against Mongolia, the highest team total in T20I history at the time. Kushal Malla scored 137* off 50 balls, including the fastest T20I century on record at 34 balls, while Dipendra Singh Airee hit the fastest T20I fifty at 9 balls. Nepal beat Maldives in the next match but lost to India by 23 runs in the quarter-final.

Nepal qualified for the 2024 ICC Men's T20 World Cup after defeating UAE in semifinal of 2023 Asia Regional Final. This marked Nepal's second World Cup appearance and their first in 10 years. Competing in Group D, they were drawn alongside the Netherlands, Sri Lanka, South Africa, and Bangladesh. Nepal lost their opening match to the Netherlands, and their subsequent fixture against Sri Lanka was abandoned due to rain. In the 3rd match, the Nepali bowlers restricted the Proteas to 115 runs. However, Nepal fell heartbreakingly short, losing by just one run after a run-out on the final ball. Already eliminated before their final group match, Nepal ended their campaign with a loss to Bangladesh, where they were bowled out for 85.

In September 2025, Nepal faced the West Indies at Sharjah Cricket Stadium for their first-ever bilateral T20I series against a Full Member, even though the Caribbean side rested several key players. The series was named the Unity Cup commemorating the resilience shown during the 2025 Gen Z protests. Nepal won the opening match by 19 runs, recording their first ever T20I victory against a Full Member nation. They sealed the series in the second match with a 90-run win, dismissing West Indies for 83, the lowest total by a Full Member team against an Associate nation in T20Is. West Indies won the third match by 10 wickets, but Nepal finished 2-1, also marking the first time Nepal won a bilateral series against a Full Member team. Kushal Bhurtel was named Player of the Series, largely due to his bowling performance.

27 September 2025

Nepal; 148/8 (20.0 overs)	v	West Indies; 129/9 (20.0 overs)
Rohit Paudel 38 (35); Jason Holder 4/20 (4 overs)		Navin Bidaisee 22 (25); Kushal Bhurtel 2/17 (4 overs)

Nepal won by 19 runs
Sharjah Cricket Stadium, Sharjah
Umpires: Buddhi Pradhan (NEP) and Durga Subedi (NEP)
Player of the match: Rohit Paudel (NEP)

- West Indies won the toss and elected to field.
- This was Nepal's first victory against a Test playing nation

Nepal qualified for the 2026 ICC Men's T20 World Cup, hosted by India and Sri Lanka, through the Asia/East Asia-Pacific Qualifier held in Oman in October 2025. Their opening match against England at Wankhede Stadium was the most talked-about of their campaign. England posted 184 runs on the board with the help of half-centuries from Will Jacks and Jacob Bethell. Nepal nearly pulled off the tournament's biggest upset, needing just 10 runs from the final over, but Sam Curran’s precise yorkers denied them victory. Despite being praised for their performance against England, Nepal suffered a shock 10-wicket defeat to Italy in their next game. Against West Indies, Nepal recovered from a top-order collapse with Dipendra Singh Airee scoring 58 off 47 balls but were beaten comfortably. Nepal's campaign ended with three consecutive defeats before their final group match against Scotland, where Airee's unbeaten 50 off 23 balls helped them to a seven-wicket win, Nepal's first T20 World Cup victory in 12 years and their first in the main tournament. In 2026, Nepal qualified for the 2027 Asia Cup after defeating the United Arab Emirates by 44 runs in the final of the ACC Men's Premier Cup. It will be Nepal's second appearance in the Asia Cup, after their debut in 2023.

== Team image ==
=== Home Ground ===
Locations of all major cricket stadiums within Nepal.

TU Cricket Ground in Kirtipur and Mulpani Cricket Ground in Mulpani, Kathmandu are the only two grounds with One Day International status. There are other cricket grounds in the country that host regional and national level tournaments with some being under construction and few undergoing some development.

Venue	Location	Capacity	Tests	ODIs	T20Is	WT20Is
TU Cricket Ground	Kirtipur, Bagmati	15,000	0	34	34	14
Upper Mulpani Cricket Ground	Kageshwari-Manohara, Bagmati	4,000	0	1	13	0
Pokhara Cricket Stadium	Pokhara, Gandaki	(Proposed expansion)	0	0	0	4

=== Kit evolution ===
==== Kit suppliers ====
Kit provider	Period
(Spain) KELME	2021–2025
(India) T10 Sports	2025–present

== Tournament history ==
Legend

- Champions
- Runners-up
- Third place/Semi-finals
- Hosts
- Q Qualified
- DNQ Did not qualify
- ▲ Promoted
- Remained in the same division
- ▼ Relegated

=== Cricket World Cup ===
Cricket World Cup record								Qualification record				
Year	Round	Position	Pld	W	L	T	NR	Pld	W	L	T	NR
(England) 1975	Not an ICC member							Not an ICC member				
(England) 1979	Not an ICC member							Not an ICC member				
(England) (Wales) 1983	Not an ICC member							Not an ICC member				
(India) (Pakistan) 1987	Not an ICC member							Not an ICC member				
(Australia) (New Zealand) 1992	Not an ICC member							Not an ICC member				
(Pakistan) (India) (Sri Lanka) 1996	Not an ICC member							Not an ICC member				
(England) (Wales) (Scotland) (Republic of Ireland) (Netherlands) 1999	Did not enter							Did not enter				
(South Africa) (Zimbabwe) (Kenya) 2003	Did not qualify							3	2	1	0	0
(Cricket West Indies) 2007	Did not qualify							10	7	3	0	0
(India) (Sri Lanka) (Bangladesh) 2011	Did not qualify							7	5	1	0	1
(Australia) (New Zealand) 2015	Did not qualify							30	20	10	0	0
(England) (Wales) 2019	Did not qualify							38	18	19	0	1
(India) 2023	Did not qualify							42	21	19	1	1
(South Africa) (Zimbabwe) (Namibia) 2027	To be determined							36*	14	20	0	2
Total	—N/a	0/14	–	–	–	–	–	166	87	73	1	5

=== Men's T20 World Cup ===
Men's T20 World Cup record								Qualification record				
Year	Round	Position	Pld	W	L	T	NR	Pld	W	L	T	NR
(South Africa) 2007	Not eligible; no ODI status							Not eligible				
(England) 2009	Not eligible; no ODI status							Not eligible				
(Cricket West Indies) 2010	Not eligible; no ODI status							Not eligible				
(Sri Lanka) 2012	Did not qualify							15	8	7	0	0
(Bangladesh) 2014	First stage	12/16	3	2	1	0	0	16	10	6	0	0
(India) 2016	Did not qualify							6	1	4	0	1
(United Arab Emirates) (Oman) 2021	Did not qualify							10	7	2	0	1
(Australia) 2022	Did not qualify							5	4	1	0	0
(United States) (Cricket West Indies) 2024	Group Stage	17/20	4	0	3	0	1	5	3	1	1	0
(India) (Sri Lanka) 2026	Group Stage	16/20	4	1	3	0	0	6	6	0	0	0
(Australia) (New Zealand) 2028	To be determined							To be determined				
Total	0 Titles	3/10	11	3	7	0	1	63	39	21	1	2

=== Cricket World Cup Qualifier ===
Cricket World Cup Qualifier record
Year	Round	Position	Pld	W	L	T	NR	Qual.
(Sri Lanka) 1979	Not an ICC member							
(England) 1982	Not an ICC member							
(England) 1986	Not an ICC member							
(Netherlands) 1990	Not an ICC member							
(Kenya) 1994	Not an ICC member							
(Malaysia) 1997	Did not enter							
(Canada) 2001	Division Two	20/24	3	2	1	0	0	DNQ
(Ireland) 2005	Did not qualify							
(South Africa) 2009	Did not qualify							
(New Zealand) 2014	Group stage	9/10	6	1	5	0	0	DNQ
(Zimbabwe) 2018	Group stage	8/10	6	2	4	0	0	DNQ
(Zimbabwe) 2023	Group stage	8/10	6	2	4	0	0	DNQ
(Namibia) (South Africa) 2027	To be determined							
Total	0 Titles	4/13	21	7	14	0	0	—N/a

=== CWC League 2 ===
Cricket World Cup League 2 record
Year	Round	Position	Pld	W	L	T	NR	P/R
2019–2023	Fourth place	3/7	36	19	15	1	1	Same position
2024–2026	League stage	6/8	36	14	20	0	2	Same position
Total	0 Titles	2/2	72	33	35	1	3	—N/a

=== T20 World Cup Global Qualifier ===
T20 World Cup Qualifier records
Year	Round	Position	Pld	W	L	T	NR	Qual.
(Ireland) 2008	Not eligible; no ODI status							
(United Arab Emirates) 2010	Not eligible; no ODI status							
(United Arab Emirates) 2012	Play-offs	7/16	9	5	4	0	0	DNQ
(United Arab Emirates) 2013	Third place	3/16	10	6	4	0	0	DNQ
(Ireland) (Scotland) 2015	Group stage	12/16	6	1	4	0	1	DNQ
(United Arab Emirates) 2019	Did not qualify							
(Oman) 2022 (A)	Third place	3/8	5	4	1	0	0	DNQ
(To be determined) 2028	Qualified							
Total	0 Titles	4/8	30	16	13	0	1	—N/a

=== T20 World Cup Asia Regional Final ===
T20 World Cup Asia Regional Final record
Year	Round	Position	Pld	W	L	T	NR	Qual.
(Singapore) 2019	Third place	3/5	4	2	2	0	0	DNQ
(Nepal) 2023	Runners-up	2/8	5	3	2	0	0	Q
(Oman) 2025	Champions	1/9	6	6	0	0	0	Q
(To be determined) 2027	Qualified							
Total	1 Title	4/4	15	11	4	0	0	—N/a

=== Asia Cup ===
Asia Cup record
Year	Round	Position	Pld	W	L	T	NR
(United Arab Emirates) 1984	No qualification						
(Sri Lanka) 1986	Did not enter						
(Bangladesh) 1988	No qualification						
(India) 1991	No qualification						
(United Arab Emirates) 1995	No qualification						
(Sri Lanka) 1997	No qualification						
(Bangladesh) 2000	No qualification						
(Sri Lanka) 2004	Did not qualify						
(Pakistan) 2008	Did not qualify						
(Sri Lanka) 2010	No qualification						
(Bangladesh) 2012	No qualification						
(Bangladesh) 2014	No qualification						
(Bangladesh) 2016	Did not qualify						
(United Arab Emirates) 2018	Did not qualify						
(United Arab Emirates) 2022	Did not qualify						
(Pakistan) (Sri Lanka) 2023	Group stage	8/8	2	0	2	0	0
(United Arab Emirates) 2025	Did not qualify						
(Bangladesh) 2027	Qualified						
Total	0 Titles	2/18	2	0	2	0	0

=== Asian Games ===
Asian Games record
Year	Round	Position	Pld	W	L	T	NR
(China) 2010	Quarter-finals	8/9	3	1	2	0	0
(South Korea) 2014	Quarter-finals	5/10	3	2	1	0	0
(China) 2022	Quarter-finals	5/12	3	2	1	0	0
(Japan) 2026	Quarter-finals	6/10	3	1	0	0	2
Total	0 Titles	4/4	12	6	4	0	2

=== South Asian Games ===
South Asian Games record
Year	Round	Position	Pld	W	L	T	NR
(Bangladesh) 2010	Fourth place	4/5	5	1	4	0	0
(Nepal) 2019	Bronze medal	3/5	5	3	2	0	0
(Pakistan) 2027	Qualified						
Total	0 Titles	3/3	10	4	6	0	0

=== Other international tournaments ===
ICC Intercontinental Cup (FC)	World Cricket League (LA/ODI/50 overs)
2004 (Asia group): Runners-up; 2005 (Asia group): Runners-up	2008 (Division Five): 3rd place; 2010 (Division Five): Winners (▲); 2010 (Division Four): 3rd place; 2012 (Division Four): Winners (▲); 2013 (Division Three): Winners (▲); 2014 (Division Three): Winners (▲); 2015 (Division Two): 4th place (▲); 2015–17 (Championship): 7th place (▼); 2018 (Division Two): Runners-up

=== Other regional tournaments ===
ACC Premier Cup/Asia Cup Qualifier (OD/T20I)	ACC Twenty20 Cup (T20)	ACC Trophy (OD)	Asia Cup Rising Stars (List A/T20)
2018 : 4th place (DNQ); 2023 : Winners (Q); 2024 : 4th place (DNQ); 2026 : Winners (Q)	2007: Group stage; 2009: 5th place; 2011: 4th place; 2013: Runners-up	1996 : First round; 1998 : First round; 2000 : Semi-finals; 2002 : Runners-up; 2004 : 5th place; 2006 : 4th place; 2008 : 4th place; 2010 : Runners-up; 2012 : Winners (Shared with UAE)	2013: Group stage; 2017: Group stage; 2019: Group stage; 2023: Group stage; 2026: Qualified
ACC Eastern Region T20 (T20)	ACC Premier League (OD)	Fast Track Countries Tournament	
2020: 4th place	2014: 3rd place	2004/05: 3rd place; 2005/06: Runners-up; 2006/07: Winners	

== Current Squad ==
The list of ODI & T20I centrally contracted players with Cricket Association of Nepal for 2025-2026 year. The bold players selected for 2026 Asian Games.

As of 12 Sep 2026

No.	Name	Age	Batting style	Bowling style	C/G	Forms	Domestic Team	NPL	Last ODI	Last T20I	Remarks
Batsmen
14	Kushal Bhurtel	29	Right-handed	Right-arm Leg break	A	ODI, T20I	Nepal Police Club	Pokhara Avengers	(Netherlands) 2026	(Hong Kong) 2026	
11	Arjun Kumal	20	Right-handed	Right-arm Leg break	C	ODI	Gandaki Province	Pokhara Avengers	(United Arab Emirates) 2026	—N/a	
52	Bhim Sharki	25	Right-handed	—N/a	B	ODI	Nepal Army Club	Kathmandu Gorkhas	(Netherlands) 2026	—N/a	
52	Ishan Pandey	28	Left-handed	Right-arm off break	C	ODI	Bagmati Province	Sudurpashchim Royals	(United Arab Emirates) 2026	—N/a	
17	Rohit Paudel	24	Right-handed	Right-arm off break	A+	ODI, T20I	APF Club	Lumbini Lions	(United Arab Emirates) 2026	(Hong Kong) 2026	
21	Sundeep Jora	25	Right-handed	—N/a	C	ODI, T20I	APF Club	Lumbini Lions	(United Arab Emirates) 2026	(United Arab Emirates) 2026	
24	Aarif Sheikh	29	Right-handed	Right-arm medium	B	ODI, T20I	Nepal Police Club	Sudurpaschim Royals	(Netherlands) 2026	(United Arab Emirates) 2026	
Wicket-keepers
09	Aasif Sheikh	25	Right-handed	—N/a	A	ODI, T20I	APF Club	Lumbini Lions	(United Arab Emirates) 2026	(Hong Kong) 2026	
16	Anil Kumar Sah	28	Right-handed	—N/a	C	ODI, T20I	Madhesh Province	Janakpur Bolts	(Netherlands) 2025	(Scotland) 2025	
07	Binod Bhandari	36	Right-handed	—N/a	C	ODI	Nepal Army Club	Sudurpaschim Royals	(United Arab Emirates) 2026	—N/a	
01	Lokesh Bam	26	Right-handed	—N/a	C	T20I	APF Club	Biratnagar Kings	—N/a	(Hong Kong) 2026	
All-rounders
45	Dipendra Singh Airee	26	Right-handed	Right-arm off break	A+	ODI, T20I	—N/a	Sudurpaschim Royals	(United Arab Emirates) 2026	(Hong Kong) 2026	T20I Captain
15	Gulsan Jha	20	Left-handed	Right-arm medium	B	ODI, T20I	Nepal Police Club	Karnali Yaks	(United Arab Emirates) 2025	(United Arab Emirates) 2026	
75	Basir Ahamad	23	Left-handed	Slow left-arm orthodox	C	ODI, T20I	Nepal Army Club	Biratnagar Kings	(United Arab Emirates) 2026	(United Arab Emirates) 2026	
02	Kushal Malla	22	Left-handed	Slow left-arm orthodox	C	T20I	Nepal Army Club	Chitwan Rhinos	—N/a	(Hong Kong) 2026	
Pace bowlers
10	Sompal Kami	30	Right-handed	Right-arm Fast medium	A	ODI, T20I	Nepal Army Club	Karnali Yaks	(Namibia) 2026	(Hong Kong) 2026	
33	Karan KC	35	Right-handed	Right-arm Fast medium	A	ODI, T20I	Nepal Police Club	Kathmandu Gorkhas	(United Arab Emirates) 2026	(Hong Kong) 2026	
22	Nandan Yadav	26	Right-handed	Right-arm medium	B	ODI, T20I	APF Club	Karnali yaks	(Namibia) 2026	(China) 2026	
13	Hemant Dhami	20	Right-handed	Right-arm medium	C	ODI, T20I	Sudurpaschim Province	Sudurpaschim Royals	(Malaysia) 2026	(United Arab Emirates) 2026	
Spin bowlers
25	Sandeep Lamichhane	26	Right-handed	Right-arm Leg break	A+	ODI, T20I	Bagmati Province	Biratnagar Kings	(United Arab Emirates) 2026	(Hong Kong) 2026	ODI Captain
27	Lalit Rajbanshi	27	Right-handed	Slow left-arm orthodox	B	ODI	Nepal Police Club	Janakpur Bolts	(United Arab Emirates) 2026	—N/a	
23	Sher Malla	23	Left-handed	Right-arm off-break	C	ODI, T20I	Sudurpashchim Province	Lumbini Lions	(Oman) 2026	(Hong Kong) 2026	
05	Shahab Alam	25	Left-handed	Slow left-arm orthodox	C	T20I	Nepal Army Club	Kathmandu Gorkhas	—N/a	(China) 2026	

=== Pay grade ===
CAN awards central contracts to its players, their pay is graded according to the importance of the player. Players' Monthly salaries are as follows:

- Grade A+ – रु. 1,20,000
- Grade A – रु. 1,00,000
- Grade B – रु. 75,000
- Grade C – रु. 55,000
- Grade D – रु. 35,000

Match fees

Players also receive a match fee of Rs 5,000 per T20I match and Rs 10,000 per ODI match.

As of 25 May 2026

== Development Squad ==
The list of ODI & T20I centrally contracted players under grade D with Cricket Association of Nepal for 2025-2026 year.

As of 25 May 2026

- Dev Khanal
- Deepak Dumre
- Arjun Saud (WK)
- Trit Raj Das
- Bipin Khatri
- Pawan Sarraf
- Rashid Khan
- Santosh Yadav
- Arjun Gharti (WK)
- Pratish GC
- Rijan Dhakal
- Aakash Chand
- Sagar Dhakal
- Yuvaraj Khatri

== Coaching staff ==
Position	Name
Head Coach	(Australia) Stuart Law
Assistant Coach	(South Africa) Nic Pothas
Bowling Consultant	(Australia) Ian Harvey
Strength and Conditioning coach	(India) Abdul Sattar
Cricket Manager	(Nepal) Binod Das
Logistics Manager	(Nepal) Prabal Gautam
Physiotherapist	(Nepal) Lokendra Kunwar
Masseur	(Cricket West Indies) Dane Dominic Currency
Analyst	(Nepal) Raman Shiwakoti
Photographer	(Nepal) Sajan Lamichhane

=== Coaching history ===
Period	Coach	Achievements
2001	(Pakistan) Aftab Baloch	• Guided Nepal in early ICC regional tournaments. • Helped lay the foundation for Nepal’s youth cricket development.
2001–2010	(Sri Lanka) Roy Dias	• Led Nepal to victory in the 2006 ACC Premier League. • Coached Nepal U19s in the 2006 and 2008 U19 World Cups. • Established Nepal as a strong Associate nation in Asia.
2011–2015	(Sri Lanka) Pubudu Dassanayake	• Qualified Nepal for the 2014 ICC T20 World Cup — Nepal’s first global event. • Improved fitness, discipline, and professionalism within the team.
2015–2019	(Nepal) Jagat Tamata	• Guided Nepal to WCL Division 2 2018 success. • Helped Nepal earn One Day International status for the first time. • Coached during Nepal’s debut in 2018 Asia Cup Qualifier.
2019–2020	(India) Umesh Patwal	• Oversaw Nepal’s first full ODI series as an ODI nation. • Focused on player development of youngsters like Rohit Paudel and Kushal Bhurtel.
2020–2021	(Australia) Dav Whatmore	• Led Nepal to victory in the 2021 Tri-Nation T20I Series at home. • Strengthened batting and fielding structures. • Promoted a more aggressive playing style.
2021–2022	(Sri Lanka) Pubudu Dassanayake	• Returned for second tenure. • Guided Nepal to the 2023 ICC Cricket World Cup Qualifier Play-off. • Revitalized senior players’ form and mentored new talents.
2022	(India) Manoj Prabhakar	• Short tenure focused on side rebuilding. • Integrated domestic performers into the national squad. • Began preparations for 2023 qualifying campaigns.
2023–2025	(India) Monty Desai	• Led Nepal to 2023 Asia Cup participation — Nepal’s debut in the event. • Qualified Nepal for the 2024 T20 World Cup. • Oversaw record victories in 2023 ACC Men's Premier Cup and improved batting confidence.
2025–present	(Australia) Stuart Law	• Appointed March 2025. • Continuing Nepal’s progress following qualification for the 2026 T20 World Cup. •Qualified team for 2027 Asia Cup and 2027 Asia Cup Rising Stars •Implementing Australian high-performance structure and coaching methodology.

== Records and statistics ==
=== One Day Internationals ===
- Highest team total: 321 v. Scotland on June 8, 2025 at Forthill, Dundee.
- Highest individual score: 126, Rohit Paudel v. Papua New Guinea on 25 March 2022 at Tribhuvan University International Cricket Ground, Kirtipur.
- Best individual bowling figures: 6/11, Sandeep Lamichhane v. Papua New Guinea on 10 September 2021 at Oman Cricket Academy Ground Turf 1, Al Amerat.

Most ODI runs for Nepal

Player	Runs	Average	Career span
Rohit Paudel	2,616	31.51	2018–2026
Aasif Sheikh	2,209	29.45	2021–2026
Dipendra Singh Airee	1,878	25.37	2018–2026
Kushal Bhurtel	1,758	24.41	2021–2026
Aarif Sheikh	1,604	27.65	2018–2026

Most ODI wickets for Nepal

Player	Wickets	Average	Career span
Sandeep Lamichhane	170	19.34	2018–2026
Karan KC	113	25.82	2018–2026
Sompal Kami	99	29.55	2018–2026
Lalit Rajbanshi	70	24.64	2019–2026
Dipendra Singh Airee	66	31.18	2018–2026

Head-to-head record

Opponent	Matches	Won	Lost	Tied	No Result	First match	First win
Full Members
India	1	0	1	0	0	4 September 2023	
Ireland	1	0	1	0	0	4 July 2023	
Pakistan	1	0	1	0	0	30 August 2023	
West Indies	1	0	1	0	0	22 June 2023	
Zimbabwe	1	0	1	0	0	18 June 2023	
Associate Members
Canada	7	4	3	0	0	8 February 2024	8 February 2024
Namibia	10	2	7	0	1	11 July 2022	14 February 2023
Netherlands	9	4	5	0	0	1 August 2018	3 August 2018
Oman	13	7	6	0	0	5 February 2020	19 September 2021
Papua New Guinea	10	8	2	0	0	7 September 2021	7 September 2021
Scotland	12	6	5	0	1	13 July 2022	13 July 2022
United Arab Emirates	21	13	8	0	0	30 August 2018	26 January 2019
United States	13	6	6	1	0	8 February 2020	8 February 2020
Totals	100	50	47	1	2	W%: 51.53%	
Statistics are correct as of ODI #5067 Nepal v United Arab Emirates at UDST Cricket Ground, Doha; 22 November 2026.

=== Twenty20 Internationals ===
- Highest team total: 314/3 v. Mongolia on 27 September 2023 at Zhejiang University of Technology Cricket Field, Hangzhou.
- Highest individual score: 137*, Kushal Malla vs Mongolia on 27 September 2023 at Zhejiang University of Technology Cricket Field, Hangzhou.
- Best individual bowling figures: 6/11, Abinash Bohara vs Maldives on 1 October 2023 at Zhejiang University of Technology Cricket Field, Hangzhou

Most T20I runs for Nepal
Runs	Player	Average	Career span
2,329	Kushal Bhurtel	31.90	2021–2026
2,235	Dipendra Singh Airee	33.86	2018–2026
1,878	Rohit Paudel	29.34	2019–2026
1,813	Aasif Sheikh	24.50	2021–2026
1,144	Kushal Malla	24.34	2019–2026

Most T20I wickets for Nepal
Wickets	Player	Average	Career span
142	Sandeep Lamichhane	12.80	2018–2026
112	Karan KC	20.53	2015–2026
89	Sompal Kami	23.32	2014–2026
75	Abinash Bohara	19.70	2019–2024
62	Dipendra Singh Airee	21.19	2018–2026

Head-to-head record

Opponent	Matches	Won	Lost	Tied	No Result	First match	First win
ICC Full Members
Afghanistan	2	2	0	0	0	20 March 2014	20 March 2014
Bangladesh	2	0	2	0	0	18 March 2014	
England	1	0	1	0	0	8 February 2026	
India	1	0	1	0	0	3 October 2023	
Ireland	3	0	3	0	0	13 July 2015	
South Africa	1	0	1	0	0	14 June 2024	
West Indies	4	2	2	0	0	27 September 2025	27 September 2025
Zimbabwe	2	0	2	0	0	27 September 2019	
ICC Associate members
Bhutan	1	1	0	0	0	5 December 2019	5 December 2019
Canada	3	1	2	0	0	21 February 2022	21 February 2022
China	1	1	0	0	0	31 May 2026	31 May 2026
Hong Kong	13	6	5	0	2	16 March 2014	16 March 2014
Italy	1	0	1	0	0	12 February 2026	
Japan	2	1	0	0	1	10 October 2025	10 October 2025
Kenya	5	3	2	0	0	25 August 2022	25 August 2022
Kuwait	4	3	1	0	0	27 July 2019	27 July 2019
Malaysia	11	10	1	0	0	13 July 2019	13 July 2019
Maldives	3	3	0	0	0	6 December 2019	6 December 2019
Mongolia	1	1	0	0	0	27 September 2023	27 September 2023
Namibia	2	1	1	0	0	27 February 2024	1 March 2024
Netherlands	15	6	7	1	1	30 June 2015	3 July 2015
Oman	10	7	2	1	0	10 October 2019	11 February 2022
Papua New Guinea	6	4	2	0	0	17 July 2015	28 March 2022
Philippines	1	1	0	0	0	19 February 2022	19 February 2022
Qatar	4	3	1	0	0	23 July 2019	13 April 2024
Samoa	1	1	0	0	0	17 October 2025	17 October 2025
Saudi Arabia	1	1	0	0	0	17 April 2024	17 April 2024
Scotland	3	2	1	0	0	17 June 2025	17 June 2025
Singapore	3	2	1	0	0	28 July 2019	28 September 2019
Thailand	1	1	0	0	0	4 March 2020	4 March 2020
United Arab Emirates	13	7	6	0	0	31 January 2019	1 February 2019
United States	3	2	0	1	0	17 October 2024	17 October 2024
Totals	124	72	45	3	4	W%: 60.83%	
Statistics are correct as of T20I #4147 Nepal v Japan at Kōrogi Sports Park, Nisshin; 26 September 2026.

== See also ==
- Cricket in Nepal
- Cricket Association of Nepal
- Nepal A cricket team
- Nepal national under-19 cricket team
- List of Nepal Twenty20 International cricket records
- List of Nepal ODI cricketers
- List of Nepal Twenty20 International cricketers
- Nepal women's national cricket team
- Nepal A cricket team
- Nepal women's national under-19 cricket team
- Nepal national under-19 cricket team
- Nepal national blind cricket team
