= 2022–23 Hong Kong Quadrangular Series =

International cricket tournament

- Dates: 8 – 12 March 2023
- Administrator: Cricket Hong Kong
- Cricket format: Twenty20 International
- Tournament format(s): Round-robin and final
- Host: Hong Kong
- Champions: Hong Kong
- Runners-up: Malaysia
- Participants: 4
- Matches: 8
- Player of the series: (Hong Kong) Aizaz Khan
- Most runs: (Bahrain) Imran Anwar (130)
- Most wickets: (Hong Kong) Ehsan Khan (8) (Hong Kong) Aizaz Khan (8) (Malaysia) Rizwan Haider (8) (Kuwait) Sayed Monib (8)

The 2022–23 Hong Kong Quadrangular Series was a Twenty20 International (T20I) cricket tournament, that took place in Hong Kong in March 2023. The participating teams were the hosts Hong Kong along with Bahrain, Kuwait and Malaysia. Shortly before the tournament, Cricket Hong Kong announced that former Kent County Cricket Club player Simon Willis became the new head coach of their senior men's team.

Malaysia and Hong Kong won their matches on the opening day of the series. Both sides won again on the following day to confirm that they would meet again in the final.

Hong Kong defeated Malaysia in the final by 39 runs to win the tournament.

The T20I tournament was followed by a 50-over One Day tri-series between Hong Kong, Kuwait and Malaysia. All competing teams used the 50-over event as preparation for the 2023 Men's Premier Cup.

== Squads ==
Bahrain	Hong Kong	Kuwait	Malaysia
Sarfaraz Ali (c); Zeeshan Abbas; Sohail Ahmed; Imran Anwar; Junaid Aziz; Shahbaz Badar (wk); Ahmer Bin Nisar (wk); Haider Butt; Rizwan Butt; Ali Dawood; Prashant Kurup; Abdul Majid; Yasser Nazir; Abid Ullah Shah; Sathaiya Veerapathiran	Nizakat Khan (c); Zeeshan Ali (wk); Haroon Arshad; Mohammad Ghazanfar; Adit Gorawara (wk); Babar Hayat; Raag Kapur; Aizaz Khan; Ehsan Khan; Yasim Murtaza; Nasrulla Rana; Anshuman Rath; Kinchit Shah; Shahid Wasif	Mohammed Aslam (c); Ilyas Ahmed; Mohammad Amin; Meet Bhavsar (wk); Adnan Idrees; Shiraz Khan; Sayed Monib; Usman Patel (wk); Yasin Patel; Shahrukh Quddus; Ravija Sandaruwan; Mohamed Shafeeq; Bilal Tahir; Ali Zaheer	Ahmad Faiz (c); Virandeep Singh (vc, wk); Muhammad Amir; Mohamed Arief; Wan Azam (wk); Syed Aziz; Rizwan Haider; Syazrul Idrus; Aslam Khan; Rahim Khan; Sharvin Muniandy; Fitri Sham; Vijay Unni; Muhammad Wafiq; Zubaidi Zulkifle

== Round-robin ==
=== Points table ===
Pos	Team	Pld	W	L	NR	Pts	NRR
1	Hong Kong	3	3	0	0	6	0.580
2	Malaysia	3	2	1	0	4	0.951
3	Bahrain	3	1	2	0	2	−0.958
4	Kuwait	3	0	3	0	0	−0.594

Source: ESPNcricinfo

Qualified for the final
Advanced to the third place play-off

=== Fixtures ===
8 March 2023
09:30
Scorecard

Kuwait; 158/9 (20 overs)	v	Malaysia; 163/7 (19 overs)
Meet Bhavsar 67 (41); Vijay Unni 3/15 (4 overs)		Virandeep Singh 58* (52); Sayed Monib 3/32 (3 overs)

Malaysia won by 3 wickets
Mission Road Ground, Mong Kok
Umpires: Tabarak Dar (HK) and Shiroy Vachha (HK)
Player of the match: Virandeep Singh (Mas)

- Malaysia won the toss and elected to field.

8 March 2023
13:40
Scorecard

Hong Kong; 153/4 (20 overs)	v	Bahrain; 138 (19.1 overs)
Aizaz Khan 42* (26); Abdul Majid 1/13 (3 overs); Sarfaraz Ali 1/13 (3 overs)		Imran Anwar 29 (15); Ehsan Khan 3/16 (3.1 overs)

Hong Kong won by 15 runs
Mission Road Ground, Mong Kok
Umpires: Niaz Ali (HK) and John Prakash (HK)
Player of the match: Aizaz Khan (HK)

- Bahrain won the toss and elected to field.
- Abdul Majid and Ali Dawood (Bhr) both made their T20I debuts.

9 March 2023
09:30
Scorecard

Malaysia; 200/6 (20 overs)	v	Bahrain; 147/9 (20 overs)
Muhammad Amir 80 (52); Sathaiya Veerapathiran 2/29 (4 overs)		Sohail Ahmed 65 (46); Rizwan Haider 4/34 (4 overs)

Malaysia won by 53 runs
Mission Road Ground, Mong Kok
Umpires: John Prakash (HK) and Gandhimathinathan Sankaranarayanan (HK)
Player of the match: Muhammad Amir (Mas)

- Bahrain won the toss and elected to field.

9 March 2023
13:40
Scorecard

Hong Kong; 161/7 (20 overs)	v	Kuwait; 150/9 (20 overs)
Anshuman Rath 57 (42); Mohamed Shafeeq 2/35 (4 overs)		Bilal Tahir 35* (20); Haroon Arshad 3/19 (4 overs)

Hong Kong won by 11 runs
Mission Road Ground, Mong Kok
Umpires: Tabarak Dar (HK) and Shelton D'Cruz (HK)
Player of the match: Haroon Arshad (HK)

- Kuwait won the toss and elected to field.
- Adit Gorawara (HK) made his T20I debut.

11 March 2023
09:30
Scorecard

Kuwait; 156/8 (20 overs)	v	Bahrain; 159/6 (19 overs)
Shiraz Khan 50* (24); Imran Anwar 3/22 (4 overs)		Imran Anwar 87 (52); Mohammad Aslam 2/27 (4 overs)

Bahrain won by 4 wickets
Mission Road Ground, Mong Kok
Umpires: Niaz Ali (HK) and Tabarak Dar (HK)
Player of the match: Imran Anwar (Bhr)

- Bahrain won the toss and elected to field.
- Yasser Nazir (Bhr) made his T20I debut.

11 March 2023
13:40
Scorecard

Malaysia; 95 (18.4 overs)	v	Hong Kong; 98/6 (19.1 overs)
Sharvin Muniandy 26 (30); Haroon Arshad 2/6 (2 overs)		Aizaz Khan 44* (46); Fitri Sham 2/18 (4 overs)

Hong Kong won by 4 wickets
Mission Road Ground, Mong Kok
Umpires: Tabarak Dar (HK) and John Prakash (HK)
Player of the match: Aizaz Khan (HK)

- Hong Kong won the toss and elected to field.

== Third-place play-off ==
12 March 2023
09:30
Scorecard

Bahrain; 135/9 (20 overs)	v	Kuwait; 136/4 (18.1 overs)
Prashant Kurup 33 (35); Sayed Monib 2/30 (4 overs)		Ravija Sandaruwan 37 (33); Imran Anwar 3/19 (4 overs)

Kuwait won by 6 wickets
Mission Road Ground, Mong Kok
Umpires: Shelton D'Cruz (HK) and Gandhimathinathan Sankaranarayanan (HK)
Player of the match: Sayed Monib (Kuw)

- Kuwait won the toss and elected to field.

== Final ==
12 March 2023
13:40
Scorecard

Hong Kong; 182/8 (20 overs)	v	Malaysia; 143 (17.5 overs)
Anshuman Rath 49 (40); Sharvin Muniandy 3/30 (4 overs)		Zubaidi Zulkifle 29 (13); Aizaz Khan 4/26 (3 overs)

Hong Kong won by 39 runs
Mission Road Ground, Mong Kok
Umpires: Tabarak Dar (HK) and John Prakash (HK)
Player of the match: Yasim Murtaza (HK)

- Malaysia won the toss and elected to field.

== One Day Series ==
Match	Date	Team 1	Captain 1	Team 2	Captain 2	Venue	Result
1st Match	15 March	Hong Kong	Nizakat Khan	Kuwait	Mohammed Aslam	Mission Road Ground, Mong Kok	Hong Kong won by 39 runs
2nd Match	16 March	Kuwait	Mohammed Aslam	Malaysia	Ahmad Faiz	Mission Road Ground, Mong Kok	Kuwait won by 8 wickets
3rd Match	18 March	Hong Kong	Nizakat Khan	Malaysia	Ahmad Faiz	Mission Road Ground, Mong Kok	Hong Kong won by 97 runs
Final	19 March	Hong Kong	Nizakat Khan	Kuwait	Mohammed Aslam	Mission Road Ground, Mong Kok	Hong Kong won by 5 runs
3rd Place Play-off	20 March	Hong Kong A	Scott McKechnie	Malaysia	Ahmad Faiz	Mission Road Ground, Mong Kok	Malaysia won by 8 wickets
