= Papua New Guinean cricket team in Hong Kong in 2016–17 =

International cricket tour

Papua New Guinea cricket team in Hong Kong in 2016–17
| | Hong Kong | Papua New Guinea |
- Dates: 4 – 8 November 2016
| Captains | Babar Hayat | Assad Vala |

One Day International series
- Results: Hong Kong won the 3-match series 2–1
| Most runs | Babar Hayat (159) | Assad Vala (114) |
| Most wickets | Anshuman Rath (9) | Chad Soper (10) |
- Player of the series: Babar Hayat (HK)

The Papua New Guinea national cricket team toured Hong Kong in November 2016 to play three One Day Internationals (ODIs) matches at Mission Road Ground, Mong Kok. Hong Kong won the series 2–1.

== Squads ==
| Hong Kong | Papua New Guinea |
|---|---|
| Babar Hayat (c); Aizaz Khan (vc); Anshuman Rath; Jamie Atkinson (wk); Christopher Carter; Kyle Christie; Ehsan Khan; Nadeem Ahmed; Nizakat Khan; Kinchit Shah; Shahid Wasif; Tanveer Ahmed; Tanwir Afzal; Waqas Khan | Assad Vala (c); Dogodo Bau (wk); Sese Bau; Mahuru Dai; Willie Gavera; Hiri Hiri; Vani Morea; Alei Nao; Nosaina Pokana; John Reva; Lega Siaka; Chad Soper; Tony Ura; Norman Vanua |

== ODI series ==
=== 1st ODI ===
4 November 2016
Scorecard

| Hong Kong; 269 (42 overs) | v | Papua New Guinea; 163 (38.2 overs) |
| Babar Hayat 77 (95); Mahuru Dai 3/58 (10 overs) | | Assad Vala 43 (41); Anshuman Rath 3/22 (10 overs) |

Hong Kong won by 106 runs
Mission Road Ground, Mong Kok
Umpires: Sharfuddoula (Ban) and Tabarak Dar (HK)
Player of the match: Babar Hayat (HK)

- Tabarak Dar (HK) stood in his first ODI as an umpire.
- Dogodo Bau, Sese Bau, Hiri Hiri and Chad Soper (PNG) all made their ODI debuts.

=== 2nd ODI ===
6 November 2016
Scorecard

| Papua New Guinea; 201 (45.5 overs) | v | Hong Kong; 187 (48.1 overs) |
| Assad Vala 70 (87); Nadeem Ahmed 4/50 (10 overs) | | Shahid Wasif 45 (69); Chad Soper 6/41 (10 overs) |

Papua New Guinea won by 14 runs
Mission Road Ground, Mong Kok
Umpires: Sharfuddoula (Ban) and Tabarak Dar (HK)
Player of the match: Chad Soper (PNG)

- Papua New Guinea won the toss and elected to bat.
- Kyle Christie (HK) and John Reva (PNG) both made their ODI debuts.

=== 3rd ODI ===
8 November 2016
Scorecard

| Papua New Guinea; 244/7 (50 overs) | v | Hong Kong; 181/3 (33.3 overs) |
| Mahuru Dai 76* (62); Anshuman Rath 3/25 (10 overs) | | Babar Hayat 82* (87); Lega Siaka 1/11 (3 overs) |

Hong Kong won by 7 wickets (DLS method)
Mission Road Ground, Mong Kok
Umpires: Sharfuddoula (Ban) and Ian Thomson (HK)
Player of the match: Anshuman Rath (HK)

- Papua New Guinea won the toss and elected to bat.
- A rain delay during Hong Kong's innings set them a revised target of 178 runs in 38 overs.
- Ian Thomson (HK) stood in his first ODI as an umpire.
