= 2019–20 Oman Pentangular Series =

Cricket tournament

- Dates: 5 – 10 October 2019
- Administrator: Oman Cricket
- Cricket format: Twenty20 International
- Host: Oman
- Champions: Oman
- Runners-up: Ireland
- Participants: 5
- Matches: 10
- Most runs: (Ireland) Kevin O'Brien (191)
- Most wickets: (Nepal) Karan KC (11)

The 2019–20 Oman Pentangular Series was a Twenty20 International (T20I) cricket tournament, that was held in Oman in October 2019. Originally scheduled to be played between four teams, it was increased to five. The series was played by Hong Kong, Ireland, Nepal, the Netherlands and hosts Oman ahead of the 2019 ICC Men's T20 World Cup Qualifier tournament in the United Arab Emirates. All the matches were played at the Al Amerat Cricket Stadium in Muscat.

In September 2019, when Cricket Hong Kong announced their squad, Anshuman Rath was not included in the side, after quitting the national team to pursue a career in India. Following Rath's announcement to quit playing for the Hong Kong team, Babar Hayat then declared that he was no longer available to play for Hong Kong. Brothers Tanveer Ahmed and Ehsan Nawaz also withdrew themselves for selection.

Hosts Oman won the tournament, after they won all four of their matches, with Ireland finishing as the runners-up.

== Squads ==
Hong Kong	Ireland	Nepal	Netherlands	Oman
Aizaz Khan (c); Kinchit Shah (vc); Ahsan Abbasi; Haroon Arshad; Waqas Barkat; Aarush Bhagwat; Kyle Christie; Mohammad Ghazanfar; Raag Kapur; Ehsan Khan; Nizakat Khan; Waqas Khan; Scott McKechnie (wk); Nasrulla Rana; Shahid Wasif	Gary Wilson (c); Mark Adair; Andrew Balbirnie; Gareth Delany; George Dockrell; Shane Getkate; Barry McCarthy; Kevin O'Brien; Boyd Rankin; Simi Singh; Paul Stirling; Harry Tector; Stuart Thompson; Lorcan Tucker; Craig Young	Paras Khadka (c); Dipendra Singh Airee (vc); Binod Bhandari (wk); Sushan Bhari; Abinash Bohara; Sundeep Jora; Sompal Kami; Karan KC; Sandeep Lamichhane; Kushal Malla; Ishan Pandey; Rohit Paudel; Lalit Rajbanshi; Pawan Sarraf; Aarif Sheikh	Pieter Seelaar (c); Colin Ackermann; Philippe Boissevain; Ben Cooper; Ryan ten Doeschate; Scott Edwards (wk); Brandon Glover; Timm van der Gugten; Fred Klaassen; Paul van Meekeren; Roelof van der Merwe; Max O'Dowd; Shane Snater; Antonius Staal; Tobias Visee	Zeeshan Maqsood (c); Aqib Ilyas (vc); Khawar Ali; Fayyaz Butt; Sandeep Goud; Aamir Kaleem; Kaleemullah; Bilal Khan; Mehran Khan; Naseem Khushi; Suraj Kumar; Sufyan Mehmood; Mohammad Nadeem; Khurram Nawaz; Jay Odedra; Jatinder Singh

== Points table ==
Pos	Team	Pld	W	L	T	NR	Pts	NRR
1	Oman (H)	4	4	0	0	0	8	2.268
2	Ireland	4	3	1	0	0	6	0.648
3	Nepal	4	2	2	0	0	4	−0.731
4	Netherlands	4	1	3	0	0	2	−0.208
5	Hong Kong	4	0	4	0	0	0	−2.070

(H) Host

== Fixtures ==
5 October 2019
09:30
Scorecard

Hong Kong; 96/9 (20 overs)	v	Oman; 97/3 (13.5 overs)
Haroon Arshad 19* (23); Mohammad Nadeem 2/22 (4 overs)		Zeeshan Maqsood 39* (34); Kyle Christie 1/20 (3 overs)

Oman won by 7 wickets
Al Amerat Cricket Stadium, Muscat
Umpires: Rahul Asher (Oma) and Rashid Riaz (Pak)

- Hong Kong won the toss and elected to bat.
- Suraj Kumar (Oma), Ahsan Abbasi, Haroon Arshad, Aarush Bhagwat, Kyle Christie, Scott McKechnie and Nasrulla Rana (HK) all made their T20I debuts.

5 October 2019
14:00
Scorecard

Netherlands; 167/7 (20 overs)	v	Ireland; 169/4 (18.2 overs)
Ben Cooper 65 (45); Mark Adair 2/30 (4 overs)		Harry Tector 47* (26); Shane Snater 2/21 (3 overs)

Ireland won by 6 wickets
Al Amerat Cricket Stadium, Muscat
Umpires: Vinod Babu (Oma) and Rashid Riaz (Pak)

- Ireland won the toss and elected to field.
- Colin Ackermann (Ned) made his T20I debut.

6 October 2019
09:30
Scorecard

Oman; 173/9 (20 overs)	v	Ireland; 130 (16.2 overs)
Aamir Kaleem 46 (27); Stuart Thompson 2/21 (4 overs)		Kevin O'Brien 39 (16); Mohammad Nadeem 3/14 (4 overs)

Oman won by 43 runs
Al Amerat Cricket Stadium, Muscat
Umpires: Harikrishna Pillai (Oma) and Rashid Riaz (Pak)

- Ireland won the toss and elected to field.

6 October 2019
14:00
Scorecard

Hong Kong; 125/6 (20 overs)	v	Nepal; 126/6 (19 overs)
Waqas Barkat 37 (47); Karan KC 4/36 (4 overs)		Binod Bhandari 58* (48); Nasrulla Rana 2/14 (4 overs)

Nepal won by 4 wickets
Al Amerat Cricket Stadium, Muscat
Umpires: Rahul Asher (Oma) and Rashid Riaz (Pak)

- Nepal won the toss and elected to field.
- Mohammad Ghazanfar and Raag Kapur (HK) both made their T20I debuts.

7 October 2019
09:30
Scorecard

Netherlands; 133 (19.3 overs)	v	Nepal; 134/6 (19.5 overs)
Max O'Dowd 43 (44); Karan KC 4/17 (3.3 overs)		Paras Khadka 33 (41); Roelof van der Merwe 2/14 (4 overs)

Nepal won by 4 wickets
Al Amerat Cricket Stadium, Muscat
Umpires: Vinod Babu (Oma) and Rashid Riaz (Pak)

- Nepal won the toss and elected to field.

7 October 2019
14:00
Scorecard

Ireland; 208/5 (20 overs)	v	Hong Kong; 142/9 (20 overs)
Kevin O'Brien 124 (62); Ehsan Khan 3/32 (4 overs)		Haroon Arshad 45 (27); Boyd Rankin 2/21 (4 overs)

Ireland won by 66 runs
Al Amerat Cricket Stadium, Muscat
Umpires: Harikrishna Pillai (Oma) and Rashid Riaz (Pak)

- Ireland won the toss and elected to bat.
- Kevin O'Brien became the first batsman for Ireland to score a century in T20Is.

9 October 2019
09:30
Scorecard

Ireland; 145/8 (20 overs)	v	Nepal; 132 (19.5 overs)
Paul Stirling 59 (47); Sandeep Lamichhane 2/21 (4 overs)		Aarif Sheikh 26 (26); Mark Adair 3/22 (3.5 overs)

Ireland won by 13 runs
Al Amerat Cricket Stadium, Muscat
Umpires: Rahul Asher (Oma) and Vinod Babu (Oma)

- Ireland won the toss and elected to bat.

9 October 2019
14:00
Scorecard

Netherlands; 94 (15.3 overs)	v	Oman; 95/3 (15.1 overs)
Max O'Dowd 24 (18); Zeeshan Maqsood 4/7 (3 overs)		Aqib Ilyas 44 (41); Pieter Seelaar 2/20 (4 overs)

Oman won by 7 wickets
Al Amerat Cricket Stadium, Muscat
Umpires: Rahul Asher (Oma) and Harikrishna Pillai (Oma)

- Netherlands won the toss and elected to bat.
- Khawar Ali (Oma) took a hat-trick.

10 October 2019
09:30
Scorecard

Netherlands; 185/4 (20 overs)	v	Hong Kong; 148/7 (20 overs)
Tobias Visee 68 (43); Kinchit Shah 1/25 (4 overs)		Haroon Arshad 68 (40); Brandon Glover 4/26 (3 overs)

Netherlands won by 37 runs
Al Amerat Cricket Stadium, Muscat
Umpires: Vinod Babu (Oma) and Harikrishna Pillai (Oma)

- Hong Kong won the toss and elected to field.

10 October 2019
14:00
Scorecard

Nepal; 64 (11 overs)	v	Oman; 65/4 (11.5 overs)
Aarif Sheikh 20 (13); Aamir Kaleem 5/15 (4 overs)		Suraj Kumar 42* (30); Karan KC 2/27 (3.5 overs)

Oman won by 6 wickets
Al Amerat Cricket Stadium, Muscat
Umpires: Rahul Asher (Oma) and Vinod Babu (Oma)

- Oman won the toss and elected to field.
- Aamir Kaleem became the first bowler for Oman to take a five-wicket haul in T20Is.
