= 2018 ACC Under-19 Asia Cup =

Cricket tournament

2018 Under-19 Asia Cup
- Dates: 29 September – 7 October 2018
- Administrator: Asian Cricket Council
- Cricket format: 50-over
- Tournament format(s): Round-robin, playoffs
- Host: Bangladesh
- Champions: India (6th title)
- Runners-up: Sri Lanka
- Participants: 8
- Matches: 15
- Player of the series: (India) Yashasvi Jaiswal
- Most runs: (India) Yashasvi Jaiswal (318)
- Most wickets: (India) Harsh Tyagi (11)

The 2018 Under-19 Asia Cup was the 7th edition of ACC Under-19 Cup. The cricket tournament was held in Bangladesh from 29 September to 7 October at Chittagong and Cox's Bazar. 8 teams participated in the tournament, including 5 full members of the International Cricket Council and three qualifiers. Afghanistan were the defending champions but failed to defend their title after a loss against Sri Lanka in the semi-finals. India defeated Sri Lanka by 144 runs in the final to win the tournament for the 6th time.

== Teams ==
No.	Teams	Qualification method
1	India	ICC full member
2	Pakistan	ICC full member
3	Bangladesh	ICC full member
4	Sri Lanka	ICC full member
5	Afghanistan	ICC full member
6	Hong Kong	Qualifiers
7	Nepal	Qualifiers
8	United Arab Emirates	Qualifiers

== Squads ==
Bangladesh announced their 15-man squad on 12 September.

Afghanistan	Bangladesh	Hong Kong	India	Nepal	Pakistan	Sri Lanka	United Arab Emirates
Rahmanullah Gurbaz (c) & (wk); Abdul Rahman; Abid Mohammadi; Arif Khan; Azmatullah Omarzai; Baseer Khan; Farhan Zakhil; Ijaz Ahmad; Mohammad Ishaq; Nawid Mohammad Kabir; Qais Ahmad; Riaz Hassan; Rizwanullah Murad; Samiullah Jawad; Sediqullah Atal; Suliman Arabzai; Zakiullah Sultani	Towhid Hridoy (c); Akbar Ali; Amite Hasan; Avishek Das; Mehedi Hasan; Minhazur Rahman; Mrittunjoy Chowdhury; Prantik Nawroz Nabil; Rakibul Hasan; Rishad Hossain; Sajid Hossain; Shahadat Hossain Dipu; Shamim Hossain; Shoriful Islam; Tanzid Hasan	Kabir Sodhi (c); Aarush Bhagwat (wk); Adit Gorawara; Danyial Butt; Dhananjay Rao; Haroon Arshad; Harpreet Singh; Hassan Khan Mohammad; Kalhan Challu; Mohammad Hassan; Nasrulla Rana; Raunaq Kapur; Vikas Sharma; Wajid Shah	Pawan Shah (c); Ajay Dev Goud; Anuj Rawat (wk); Ayush Badoni; Devdutt Padikkal; Harsh Tyagi; Mohit Jangra; Nehal Wadhera; Prabhsimran Singh; Rajesh Mohanty; Sabir Khan; Sameer Choudhary; Siddharth Desai; Yash Rathod; Yashasvi Jaiswal	Aasif Sheikh (c); Arun Airee; Bhim Sharki; Kamal Airee; Nandan Yadav; Pawan Sarraf; Rabindra Shahi; Rashid Khan; Ravi Shah; Rit Gautam; Rohit Kumar Paudel; Sagar Dhakal; Sundeep Jora; Surya Tamang; Trit Raj Das	Rohail Nazir (c & wk); Arshad Iqbal; Awaiz Zafar; Bilal Javed; Farrukh Waqas; Jahanzaib Sultan; Junaid Khan; Mohammad Asif; Mohammad Hasnain; Muhammad Mohsin Khan; Muhammad Musa; Naseem Shah; Saad Khan; Saim Ayub; Waqar Ahmed	Nipun Dananjaya (c); Dunith Wellalage; Kalana Perera; Kalhara Senarathne; Kamil Mishara; Naveen Fernando; Navod Paranavithana; Nipun Malinga; Nishan Madushka; Nuwanidu Fernando (wk); Pasindu Sooriyabandara; Rohan Sanjaya; Sandun Mendis; Selvarajh Mathushan; Shashika Dulshan	Fahad Nawaz (c); Aaron Benjamin; Ali Mirza; Alishan Sharafu; Ansh Tandon; Anwar Khan; Aryan Lakra; Brandon Martis; Deshan Chethyia; Jonathan Figy John; Karthik Meiyappan; Mohammed Faraazuddin; Niel Lobo; Palaniapan Meiyappan; Ronak Panoly

== Matches ==
=== Points table ===
Team	Pld	W	L	NR	T	NRR	Pts
India	3	3	0	0	0	+2.993	6
Afghanistan	3	2	1	0	0	+0.650	4
Nepal	3	1	2	0	0	–1.542	2
United Arab Emirates	3	0	3	0	0	–2.552	0

29 September 2018
Scorecard

United Arab Emirates; 140 (43.5 overs)	v	Afghanistan; 144/5 (27 overs)

Afghanistan Under-19s won by 5 wickets
Bangladesh Krira Shikkha Protisthan No 4 Ground, Savar
Umpires: Raveendra Wimalasiri (SL) and Buddhi Pradhan (Nep)
Player of the match: Azmatullah Omarzai (Afg)

- Afghanistan Under-19s won the toss and elected to field.

29 September 2018
Scorecard

India; 304/9 (50 overs)	v	Nepal; 133 (36.5 overs)

India Under-19s won by 171 runs
Bangladesh Krira Shikkha Protisthan No 3 Ground, Savar
Umpires: Tariq Rasheed (Pak) and Tanvir Ahmed (Ban)
Player of the match: Yashasvi Jaiswal (Ind)

- Nepal Under-19s won the toss and elected to field.

30 September 2018
Scorecard

India; 354/6 (50 overs)	v	United Arab Emirates; 127 (50 overs)

India Under-19s won by 227 runs
Bangladesh Krira Shikkha Protisthan No 3 Ground, Savar
Umpires: Buddhi Pradhan (Nep) and Tariq Rasheed (Pak)
Player of the match: Devdutt Padikkal (Ind)

- India Under-19s won the toss and elected to bat.

1 October 2018
Scorecard

Nepal; 131 (38.3 overs)	v	Afghanistan; 136/7 (37.3 overs)

Afghanistan Under-19s won by 3 wickets
Bangladesh Krira Shikkha Protisthan No 4 Ground, Savar
Umpires: Raveendra Wimalasiri (SL) and Tariq Rasheed (Pak)
Player of the match: Azmatullah Omarzai (Afg)

- Nepal Under-19s won the toss and elected to bat.

2 October 2018
Scorecard

India; 221 (45.3 overs)	v	Afghanistan; 170 (45.4 overs)

India Under-19s won by 51 runs
Bangladesh Krira Shikkha Protisthan No 3 Ground, Savar
Umpires: Raveendra Wimalasiri (SL) and Tariq Rasheed (Pak)
Player of the match: Yashasvi Jaiswal (Ind)

- India Under-19s won the toss and elected to bat.

2 October 2018
Scorecard

United Arab Emirates; 268/8 (50 overs)	v	Nepal; 274/7 (49.1 overs)

Nepal Under-19s won by 3 wickets
Bangladesh Krira Shikkha Protisthan No 4 Ground, Savar
Umpires: Tanvir Ahmed (Ban) Morshed Ali Khan (Ban)
Player of the match: Rohit Kumar (Nep)

- United Arab Emirates Under-19s won the toss and elected to bat.

=== Points table ===
Team	Pld	W	L	NR	T	NRR	Pts
Sri Lanka	3	3	0	0	0	+1.644	6
Bangladesh	3	2	1	0	0	+0.840	4
Pakistan	3	1	2	0	0	+0.678	2
Hong Kong	3	0	3	0	0	–4.959	0

29 September 2018
Scorecard

Bangladesh; 141 (46.4 overs)	v	Sri Lanka; 144/4 (37.5 overs)

Sri Lanka Under-19s won by 6 wickets
Zohur Ahmed Chowdhury Stadium, Chittagong
Umpires: Ahmed Shah Durrani (Afg) Nandan (Ind)
Player of the match: Nuwanidu Fernando (SL)

- Sri Lanka Under-19s on the toss and elected to field.

29 September 2018
Scorecard

Hong Kong; 77 (33 overs)	v	Pakistan; 78/1 (14.4 overs)

Pakistan Under-19s won by 9 wickets
M. A. Aziz Stadium, Chittagong
Umpires: Mahfuzur Rahman (Ban) and Unknown
Player of the match: Naseem Shah (Pak)

- Pakistan Under-19s won the toss and elected to field.

30 September 2018
Scorecard

Hong Kong; 56 (33.1 overs)	v	Sri Lanka; 58/0 (9.2 overs)

Sri Lanka Under-19 won by 10 wickets
Zohur Ahmed Chowdhury Stadium, Chittagong
Umpires: Mahfuzur Rahman (Ban) and Moniruzzaman (Ban)
Player of the match: Shashika Dulshan (SL)

- Sri Lanka Under-19s won the toss and elected to field.

1 October 2018
Scorecard

Pakistan; 187 (45.2 overs)	v	Bangladesh; 191/7 (47.2 overs)

Bangladesh Under-19s won by 3 wickets
M. A. Aziz Stadium, Chittagong
Umpires: Ahmed Shah Durrani (Afg) and Nandan (Ind)
Player of the match: Shamim Hossain (Ban)

- Bangladesh Under-19s won the toss and elected to field.

2 October 2018
Scorecard

Hong Kong; 91 (46.5 overs)	v	Bangladesh; 92/5 (11.2 overs)

Bangladesh Under-19s won by 5 wickets
Zohur Ahmed Chowdhury Stadium, Chittagong
Umpires: Ahmed Shah Durrani (Afg) and Nandan (Ind)
Player of the match: Rishad Hossain (Ban)

2 October 2018
Scorecard

Sri Lanka; 200 (49.4 overs)	v	Pakistan; 177/8 (50 overs)

Sri Lanka Under-19s won by 23 runs
M. A. Aziz Stadium, Chittagong
Umpires: Mahfuzur Rahman (Ban) and Gazi Sohel (Ban)
Player of the match: Arshad Iqbal (Pak)

- Pakistan Under-19s won the toss and elected to field.

=== Semi-finals ===
4 October 2018
Scorecard

India; 172 (49.3 Overs)	v	Bangladesh; 170 (46.2 overs)

India Under-19s won by 2 runs
Sher-e Bangla National Stadium, Mirpur
Umpires: Ahmed Shah Durrani (Afg)and Raveendra Wimalasiri (SL)
Player of the match: Mohit Jangra (Ind)

- India Under-19s won the toss and elected to bat.

5 October 2018
Scorecard

Sri Lanka; 209/7 (50 overs)	v	Afghanistan; 178 (48.3 overs)

Sri Lanka Under-19s won by 31 runs
Sher-e Bangla National Stadium, Mirpur
Umpires: Tanvir Ahmed (Ban) and Nandan (Ind)
Player of the match: Nuwanidu Fernando (Sri)

- Afghanistan Under-19s won the toss and elected to bat.

=== Final ===
7 October 2018
Scorecard

India; 304/3 (50 overs)	v	Sri Lanka; 160 (38.4 overs)

India Under-19s won by 144 runs
Sher-e Bangla National Stadium, Mirpur
Umpires: Tanvir Ahmed (Ban) and Ahmed Shah Durrani (Afg)
Player of the match: Harsh Tyagi (Ind)

- India Under-19s won the toss and elected to bat.

== Final standings ==
Pos.	Team
1	India
2	Sri Lanka
3	Bangladesh
4	Afghanistan
5	Pakistan
6	Nepal
7	United Arab Emirates
8	Hong Kong
