= Raunaq Kapur =

Hong Kong cricketer (born 2004)

Personal information
- Born: 6 February 2004 (age 22); New Delhi, India
- Batting: Left-handed
- Bowling: Right-arm off break
- Role: All-rounder
- Relatives: Raag Kapur (brother)

International information
- National side: Hong Kong
- Only T20I (cap 50): 14 April 2024 v Saudi Arabia

Domestic team information
- Years: Team
- 2024/25-: Canterbury
- Source: Cricinfo, 10 November 2025

Raunaq "Ronnie" Kapur (born 6 February 2004) is a Hong Kong cricketer. In November 2019, he was named in Hong Kong's squad for the 2019 ACC Emerging Teams Asia Cup in Bangladesh. At the age of 15, he made his List A debut for Hong Kong, against Bangladesh, in the Emerging Teams Cup on 14 November 2019. Later the same month, he was named in Hong Kong's squad for the Cricket World Cup Challenge League B tournament in Oman. In April 2024, he was named in Hong Kong's squad for the 2024 ACC Men's Premier Cup in Oman. During this tournament, he made his Twenty20 International debut against the Saudi Arabia national cricket team.

Prior to his debut for the Hong Kong Cricket Team, he also played for the Hong Kong Under-19 National cricket-team at the Asian Cricket Council's Eastern Region tournament in July 2019, in which he was declared the Best Bowler of the tournament. Kapur took 11 wickets with a bowling average of 6.36, including a five-wicket haul. He had also previously played for the Hong Kong Under-19 National cricket-team at the 2018 ACC Under-19 Asia Cup.

== Domestic career ==
In 2024, Kapur was selected to represent New Zealand at the Hong Kong Cricket Sixes, joining the national seven-man squad for the tournament. He was subsequently named as an all-rounder for the New Zealand XI to play the Sri Lanka national cricket team in a tour match at Lincoln.

Kapur made his professional debut for the Canterbury cricket team against Northern Districts men's cricket team in Hamilton, New Zealand during the 2025–26 Ford Trophy season. He has also been playing in the Hawke Cup for Canterbury Country since 2024–25.
