= 2018 Asia Cup =

Cricket tournament in the United Arab Emirates

- Dates: 15 – 28 September 2018
- Administrator: Asian Cricket Council
- Cricket format: One Day International
- Tournament format(s): Round-robin and knockout
- Host: United Arab Emirates
- Champions: India (7th title)
- Runners-up: Bangladesh
- Participants: 6
- Matches: 13
- Player of the series: (India) Shikhar Dhawan
- Most runs: (India) Shikhar Dhawan (342)
- Most wickets: (Afghanistan) Rashid Khan (10) (Bangladesh) Mustafizur Rahman (10) (India) Kuldeep Yadav (10)

The 2018 Asia Cup (also known as Unimoni Asia Cup for sponsorship reasons) was a One-Day International (ODI) cricket tournament that was held in the United Arab Emirates in September 2018. It was the 14th edition of the Asia Cup and the third time the tournament was played in the United Arab Emirates, after the 1984 and 1995 tournaments. India were the defending champions, and retained their title, after beating Bangladesh by three wickets in the final.

The five full members of the Asian Cricket Council took part in the tournament: Afghanistan, Bangladesh, India, Pakistan and Sri Lanka. They were joined by Hong Kong, who won the 2018 Asia Cup Qualifier tournament. Hong Kong had lost their ODI status after finishing tenth in the 2018 Cricket World Cup Qualifier in March. However, on 9 September 2018, the International Cricket Council (ICC) awarded ODI status to all matches in the tournament.

== Background ==
Originally, the tournament was scheduled to be played in India. It was moved to the United Arab Emirates, following ongoing political tensions between India and Pakistan.

On 29 October 2015, following the Asian Cricket Council (ACC) meeting in Singapore, the Board of Control for Cricket in India (BCCI) secretary stated that the 2018 edition of the tournament would be held in India. In August 2017, the BCCI sought government clearance to host the tournament, after the 2017 ACC Under-19 Asia Cup was moved to Malaysia. In April 2018, Mohammed bin Zayed Al Nahyan, the Crown Prince of Abu Dhabi, asked if the BCCI and ACC would consider hosting the tournament in Abu Dhabi, in a bid to ensure Pakistan's participation.

Pakistan were scheduled to host the 2018 ACC Emerging Teams Asia Cup ahead of the tournament in April. With the announcement that the Asia Cup would be played in the United Arab Emirates, the Emerging Teams Asia Cup was moved to December 2018, with Sri Lanka co-hosting the tournament with Pakistan.

== Format ==
The schedule and format of the tournament was announced on 24 July 2018, with the six teams split into two groups of three. The top two teams from each of the groups progressed to the Super Four section of the tournament. From there, the top two teams of the Super Four section played each other in the final. Initially, the team that finishes second in Group A were scheduled to play their first Super Four game in Abu Dhabi. However, India would be based in Dubai, irrespective of where they finish in the pool. On 19 September 2018, the Asian Cricket Council (ACC) revised the schedule for the Super Four section The captains of Bangladesh and Pakistan were both critical of the ACC's new schedule.

== Teams ==
- Afghanistan, ICC Full Member
- Bangladesh, ICC Full Member
- India, ICC Full Member
- Pakistan, ICC Full Member
- Sri Lanka, ICC Full Member
- Hong Kong, 2018 Asia Cup Qualifier

== Squads ==
Afghanistan	Bangladesh	Hong Kong	India	Pakistan	Sri Lanka
Asghar Afghan (c); Javed Ahmadi; Munir Ahmad; Yamin Ahmadzai; Aftab Alam; Ihsanullah; Rashid Khan; ~~Wafadar Momand~~; Mohammad Nabi; Gulbadin Naib; Rahmat Shah; Hashmatullah Shahidi; Mohammad Shahzad (wk); Samiullah Shinwari; Sayed Shirzad; Mujeeb Ur Rahman; Najibullah Zadran	Mashrafe Mortaza (c); Shakib Al Hasan (vc); Litton Das; Ariful Haque; Mominul Haque; Abu Hider; Rubel Hossain; Tamim Iqbal; Nazmul Islam; Imrul Kayes; Mahmudullah; Mehidy Hasan Miraz; Mohammad Mithun; Mushfiqur Rahim (wk); Mustafizur Rahman; Mosaddek Hossain; Soumya Sarkar; Najmul Hossain Shanto	Anshuman Rath (c); Tanwir Afzal; Nadeem Ahmed; Tanveer Ahmed; Haroon Arshad; Christopher Carter; Babar Hayat; Aftab Hussain; Raag Kapur; Aizaz Khan; Ehsan Khan; Nizakat Khan; Waqas Khan; Cameron McAuslan; Scott McKechnie; Ehsan Nawaz; Kinchit Shah	Rohit Sharma (c); Shikhar Dhawan (vc); MS Dhoni (wk) (Note: MS Dhoni captained India in last match against Afghanistan in Super 4 stage.); Khaleel Ahmed; Jasprit Bumrah; Yuzvendra Chahal; Deepak Chahar; Kedar Jadhav; Ravindra Jadeja; Dinesh Karthik (wk); Siddarth Kaul; Bhuvneshwar Kumar; KL Rahul; Manish Pandey; Ambati Rayudu; Kuldeep Yadav; ~~Hardik Pandya~~; ~~Axar Patel~~; ~~Shardul Thakur~~	Sarfaraz Ahmed (c, wk); Shaheen Afridi; Asif Ali; Hasan Ali; Mohammad Amir; Faheem Ashraf; Babar Azam; Junaid Khan; Shadab Khan; Usman Khan; Shoaib Malik; Shan Masood; Mohammad Nawaz; Mohammad Rizwan; Haris Sohail; Imam-ul-Haq; Fakhar Zaman	Angelo Mathews (c); Amila Aponso; Dushmantha Chameera; ~~Dinesh Chandimal (wk)~~; Akila Dananjaya; Niroshan Dickwella (wk); ~~Danushka Gunathilaka~~; Shehan Jayasuriya; Suranga Lakmal; Lasith Malinga; Kusal Mendis; Dilruwan Perera; Kusal Perera (wk); Thisara Perera; Kasun Rajitha; Dasun Shanaka; Dhananjaya de Silva; Upul Tharanga

Before the start of the tournament, Wafadar Momand was ruled out of Afghanistan's squad due to injury and was replaced by Yamin Ahmadzai, and Mominul Haque was added to Bangladesh's squad. Dinesh Chandimal and Danushka Gunathilaka were ruled out of Sri Lanka's squad due to injury. They were replaced by Niroshan Dickwella and Shehan Jayasuriya respectively. Bangladesh's Tamim Iqbal suffered a wrist injury in the opening match and was ruled out of the rest of the tournament.

After the conclusion of the India-Pakistan match in the group stage, Hardik Pandya, Axar Patel, and Shardul Thakur were all ruled out of India's squad for the rest of the tournament due to injuries. They were replaced by Ravindra Jadeja, Deepak Chahar, and Siddarth Kaul. At the Super Four stage of the tournament, Soumya Sarkar and Imrul Kayes were added to Bangladesh's squad. Shakib Al Hasan was ruled out of Bangladesh's final Super Four match, and the rest of the tournament, due to an injury he initially sustained in January 2018, during the final of the Bangladesh Tri-Nation Series.

== Match officials ==
The ICC appointed the following umpires and match referees for all thirteen matches. Six match officiating umpires were from participating countries of the Asia Cup who are the members of ICC International Panel of Umpires, four umpires were from neutral countries, while the remaining two umpires belonged to the Elite Panel of ICC Umpires.

Match Referees

- (Australia) David Boon
- (Zimbabwe) Andy Pycroft

Umpires from participating nations

- (Afghanistan) Ahmed Shah Pakteen
- (Bangladesh) Anisur Rahman
- (India) Anil Chaudhary
- (India) Nitin Menon
- (India) Chettithody Shamshuddin
- (Pakistan) Ahsan Raza
- (Sri Lanka) Ruchira Palliyaguruge

Umpires from neutral countries

- (Australia) Rod Tucker
- (South Africa) Marais Erasmus
- (South Africa) Shaun George
- (Cricket West Indies) Gregory Brathwaite

== Venues ==
United Arab Emirates
Dubai	Abu Dhabi
Dubai International Cricket Stadium	Sheikh Zayed Cricket Stadium
Coordinates: 25°2′48″N 55°13′8″E	Coordinates: 24°23′47″N 54°32′26″E
Capacity: 25,000	Capacity: 20,000
Matches: 8	Matches: 5

== Group stage ==
Bangladesh faced Sri Lanka in the opening game of the tournament at the Dubai International Cricket Stadium. It was Bangladesh's first match in the United Arab Emirates since April 1995, when they faced Pakistan in the 1995 Asia Cup.

In Group B, Sri Lanka were eliminated from the tournament, after losing both of their matches. Therefore Afghanistan and Bangladesh progressed to the Super Four section of the competition. In Group A, Hong Kong also lost both of their matches, meaning that India and Pakistan progressed to the Super Fours.

=== Group A ===
Pos	Team	Pld	W	L	T	NR	Pts	NRR
1	India	2	2	0	0	0	4	1.474
2	Pakistan	2	1	1	0	0	2	0.284
3	Hong Kong	2	0	2	0	0	0	−1.748

Source: ESPNCricinfo

16 September 2018
15:30 (D/N)
Scorecard

Hong Kong; 116 (37.1 overs)	v	Pakistan; 120/2 (23.4 overs)
Aizaz Khan 27 (47); Usman Khan 3/19 (7.3 overs)		Imam-ul-Haq 50* (69); Ehsan Khan 2/34 (8 overs)

Pakistan won by 8 wickets
Dubai International Cricket Stadium, Dubai
Umpires: Shaun George (SA) and Ahmed Shah Pakteen (Afg)
Player of the match: Usman Khan (Pak)

- Hong Kong won the toss and elected to bat.
- Babar Azam (Pak) became the joint second-fastest, in terms of innings, to reach 2,000 runs in ODIs.

18 September 2018
15:30 (D/N)
Scorecard

India; 285/7 (50 overs)	v	Hong Kong; 259/8 (50 overs)
Shikhar Dhawan 127 (120); Kinchit Shah 3/39 (9 overs)		Nizakat Khan 92 (115); Yuzvendra Chahal 3/46 (10 overs)

India won by 26 runs
Dubai International Cricket Stadium, Dubai
Umpires: Anisur Rahman (Ban) and Rod Tucker (Aus)
Player of the match: Shikhar Dhawan (Ind)

- Hong Kong won the toss and elected to field.
- Khaleel Ahmed (Ind) made his ODI debut.
- Nizakat Khan and Anshuman Rath made the highest ever partnership for Hong Kong in ODIs (174).

19 September 2018
15:30 (D/N)
Scorecard

Pakistan; 162 (43.1 overs)	v	India; 164/2 (29 overs)
Babar Azam 47 (62); Bhuvneshwar Kumar 3/15 (7 overs)		Rohit Sharma 52 (39); Shadab Khan 1/6 (1.3 overs)

India won by 8 wickets
Dubai International Cricket Stadium, Dubai
Umpires: Marais Erasmus (SA) and Ruchira Palliyaguruge (SL)
Player of the match: Bhuvneshwar Kumar (Ind)

- Pakistan won the toss and elected to bat.
- This was India's biggest win, in terms of balls remaining, against Pakistan in ODIs (126).

=== Group B ===
Pos	Team	Pld	W	L	T	NR	Pts	NRR
1	Afghanistan	2	2	0	0	0	4	2.270
2	Bangladesh	2	1	1	0	0	2	0.010
3	Sri Lanka	2	0	2	0	0	0	−2.280

Source: ESPNCricinfo

15 September 2018
15:30 (D/N)
Scorecard

Bangladesh; 261 (49.3 overs)	v	Sri Lanka; 124 (35.2 overs)
Mushfiqur Rahim 144 (150); Lasith Malinga 4/23 (10 overs)		Dilruwan Perera 29 (44); Mustafizur Rahman 2/20 (6 overs)

Bangladesh won by 137 runs
Dubai International Cricket Stadium, Dubai
Umpires: Marais Erasmus (SA) and Chettithody Shamshuddin (Ind)
Player of the match: Mushfiqur Rahim (Ban)

- Bangladesh won the toss and elected to bat.
- This was Sri Lanka's lowest total against Bangladesh in ODIs.

17 September 2018
15:30 (D/N)
Scorecard

Afghanistan; 249 (50 overs)	v	Sri Lanka; 158 (41.2 overs)
Rahmat Shah 72 (90); Thisara Perera 5/55 (9 overs)		Upul Tharanga 36 (64); Rashid Khan 2/26 (7.2 overs)

Afghanistan won by 91 runs
Sheikh Zayed Cricket Stadium, Abu Dhabi
Umpires: Gregory Brathwaite (WI) and Ahsan Raza (Pak)
Player of the match: Rahmat Shah (Afg)

- Afghanistan won the toss and elected to bat.
- This was Sri Lanka's first loss against Afghanistan in ODIs.

20 September 2018
15:30 (D/N)
Scorecard

Afghanistan; 255/7 (50 overs)	v	Bangladesh; 119 (42.1 overs)
Hashmatullah Shahidi 58 (92); Shakib Al Hasan 4/42 (10 overs)		Shakib Al Hasan 32 (55); Rashid Khan 2/13 (9 over)

Afghanistan won by 136 runs
Sheikh Zayed Cricket Stadium, Abu Dhabi
Umpires: Nitin Menon (Ind) and Rod Tucker (Aus)
Player of the match: Rashid Khan (Afg)

- Afghanistan won the toss and elected to bat.
- Abu Hider and Najmul Hossain Shanto (Ban) both made their ODI debuts.

== Super Four ==
In the penultimate round of Super Four matches, India beat Pakistan by nine wickets and Bangladesh beat Afghanistan by three runs. Therefore, India progressed to the final of the tournament and Afghanistan were eliminated. In the final Super Four match, Bangladesh beat Pakistan by 37 runs to advance to the final.

In India's last Super Four match, against Afghanistan, captain Rohit Sharma and vice-captain Shikhar Dhawan were both rested for the match. MS Dhoni was named captain of the side in their absence, and became the first cricketer to lead India 200 times in ODIs. Dhoni became the oldest player to lead India in an ODI. The match finished in a tie, the first time this had occurred in the Asia Cup. It was also the first time that Afghanistan were involved in a tied game in ODIs.

Pos	Team	Pld	W	L	T	NR	Pts	NRR
1	India	3	2	0	1	0	5	0.863
2	Bangladesh	3	2	1	0	0	4	−0.156
3	Pakistan	3	1	2	0	0	2	−0.599
4	Afghanistan	3	0	2	1	0	1	−0.044

Source: ESPNCricinfo

21 September 2018
15:30 (D/N)
Scorecard

Bangladesh; 173 (49.1 overs)	v	India; 174/3 (36.2 overs)
Mehedi Hasan 42 (50); Ravindra Jadeja 4/29 (10 overs)		Rohit Sharma 83* (104); Rubel Hossain 1/21 (5 overs)

India won by 7 wickets
Dubai International Cricket Stadium, Dubai
Umpires: Gregory Brathwaite (WI) and Ahsan Raza (Pak)
Player of the match: Ravindra Jadeja (Ind)

- India won the toss and elected to field.

21 September 2018
15:30 (D/N)
Scorecard

Afghanistan; 257/6 (50 overs)	v	Pakistan; 258/7 (49.3 overs)
Hashmatullah Shahidi 97* (118); Mohammad Nawaz 3/57 (10 overs)		Imam-ul-Haq 80 (104); Rashid Khan 3/46 (10 overs)

Pakistan won by 3 wickets
Sheikh Zayed Cricket Stadium, Abu Dhabi
Umpires: Anil Chaudhary (Ind) and Shaun George (SA)
Player of the match: Shoaib Malik (Pak)

- Afghanistan won the toss and elected to bat.
- Shaheen Afridi (Pak) made his ODI debut.

23 September 2018
15:30 (D/N)
Scorecard

Pakistan; 237/7 (50 overs)	v	India; 238/1 (39.3 overs)
Shoaib Malik 78 (90); Jasprit Bumrah 2/29 (10 overs)		Shikhar Dhawan 114 (100)

India won by 9 wickets
Dubai International Cricket Stadium, Dubai
Umpires: Ruchira Palliyaguruge (SL) and Rod Tucker (Aus)
Player of the match: Shikhar Dhawan (Ind)

- Pakistan won the toss and elected to bat.
- Yuzvendra Chahal (Ind) took his 50th wicket in ODIs.
- Rohit Sharma (Ind) scored his 7,000th run in ODIs.
- Rohit Sharma and Shikhar Dhawan's partnership of 210 was India's highest — while batting second, against Pakistan and in their Asia Cup history — for the first wicket.
- This was India's biggest win against Pakistan in terms of wickets (9).

23 September 2018
15:30 (D/N)
Scorecard

Bangladesh; 249/7 (50 overs)	v	Afghanistan; 246/7 (50 overs)
Mahmudullah 74 (81); Aftab Alam 3/54 (10 overs)		Hashmatullah Shahidi 71 (99); Mustafizur Rahman 2/44 (9 overs)

Bangladesh won by 3 runs
Sheikh Zayed Cricket Stadium, Abu Dhabi
Umpires: Marais Erasmus (SA) and Nitin Menon (Ind)
Player of the match: Mahmudullah (Ban)

- Bangladesh won the toss and elected to bat.
- Nazmul Islam (Ban) made his ODI debut.
- Mashrafe Mortaza (Ban) took his 250th wicket in ODIs.

25 September 2018
15:30 (D/N)
Scorecard

Afghanistan; 252/8 (50 overs)	v	India; 252 (49.5 overs)
Mohammad Shahzad 124 (116); Ravindra Jadeja 3/46 (10 overs)		KL Rahul 60 (66); Mohammad Nabi 2/40 (10 overs)

Match tied
Dubai International Cricket Stadium, Dubai
Umpires: Gregory Brathwaite (WI) and Anisur Rahman (Ban)
Player of the match: Mohammad Shahzad (Afg)

- Afghanistan won the toss and elected to bat.
- Deepak Chahar (Ind) made his ODI debut.
- MS Dhoni (Ind) played in his 200th ODI as captain.
- This was the first tied ODI in the history of the Asia Cup and the first tied ODI featuring Afghanistan.

26 September 2018
15:30 (D/N)
Scorecard

Bangladesh; 239 (48.5 overs)	v	Pakistan; 202/9 (50 overs)
Mushfiqur Rahim 99 (116); Junaid Khan 4/19 (9 overs)		Imam-ul-Haq 83 (105); Mustafizur Rahman 4/43 (10 overs)

Bangladesh won by 37 runs
Sheikh Zayed Cricket Stadium, Abu Dhabi
Umpires: Shaun George (SA) and Chettithody Shamshuddin (Ind)
Player of the match: Mushfiqur Rahim (Ban)

- Bangladesh won the toss and elected to bat.
- This was Bangladesh's first win against Pakistan in the Asia Cup in ODIs.

== Final ==
28 September 2018
15:30 (D/N)
Scorecard

Bangladesh; 222 (48.3 overs)	v	India; 223/7 (50 overs)
Litton Das 121 (117); Kuldeep Yadav 3/45 (10 overs)		Rohit Sharma 48 (55); Rubel Hossain 2/26 (10 overs)

India won by 3 wickets
Dubai International Cricket Stadium, Dubai
Umpires: Marais Erasmus (SA) and Ruchira Palliyaguruge (SL)
Player of the match: Litton Das (Ban)

- India won the toss and elected to field.
- Litton Das (Ban) scored his first century in ODIs.

== Statistics ==
=== Most runs ===
Player	Innings	Runs	Average	SR	HS
(India) Shikhar Dhawan	5	342	68.40	102.08	127
(India) Rohit Sharma	5	317	105.66	93.51	111*
(Bangladesh) Mushfiqur Rahim	5	302	60.40	81.18	144
(Afghanistan) Mohammad Shahzad	5	268	53.60	83.23	124
(Afghanistan) Hashmatullah Shahidi	5	263	65.75	72.25	97*

=== Most wickets ===
Player	Innings	Wickets	Overs	BBI	Econ.
(Afghanistan) Rashid Khan	5	10	46.1	46/3	3.72
(Bangladesh) Mustafizur Rahman	5	10	42	45/4	4.4
(India) Kuldeep Yadav	5	10	58	45/3	4.08
(India) Jasprit Bumrah	4	8	34.5	37/3	3.67
(India) Ravindra Jadeja	4	7	35	29/4	4.45
