= Ehsan Nawaz =

Hong Kong cricketer

Personal information
- Full name: Ehsan Nawaz
- Born: 21 March 1995 (age 31); Attock, Pakistan
- Batting: Right-handed
- Bowling: Right-arm fast-medium
- Role: Bowler
- Relatives: Tanveer Ahmed (brother)

International information
- National side: Hong Kong (2014–2019)
- ODI debut (cap 23): 1 May 2014 v Afghanistan
- Last ODI: 18 September 2018 v India
- T20I debut (cap 13): 20 March 2014 v Bangladesh
- Last T20I: 18 January 2017 v Netherlands

Career statistics
| Competition | ODI | T20I | FC | LA |
|---|---|---|---|---|
| Matches | 12 | 5 | 4 | 20 |
| Runs scored | 30 | 0 | 58 | 68 |
| Batting average | 5.00 | 0.00 | 58.00 | 6.18 |
| 100s/50s | 0/0 | 0/0 | 0/0 | 0/0 |
| Top score | 11 | 0 | 28* | 16* |
| Balls bowled | 513 | 46 | 395 | 783 |
| Wickets | 16 | 2 | 6 | 20 |
| Bowling average | 28.62 | 39.50 | 36.33 | 34.75 |
| 5 wickets in innings | 0 | 0 | 0 | 0 |
| 10 wickets in match | 0 | 0 | 0 | 0 |
| Best bowling | 4/47 | 1/22 | 3/85 | 4/47 |
| Catches/stumpings | 2/– | 0/– | 0/– | 2/– |
- Source: ESPNcricinfo, 30 January 2023

Ehsan Nawaz (Urdu: احسن نواز; born 21 March 1995) is a Hong Kong cricketer. He played for Hong Kong in the 2014 ICC World Twenty20 tournament. He made his One Day International debut against Afghanistan in the 2014 ACC Premier League on 1 May 2014.

In August 2018, he was named in Hong Kong's squad for the 2018 Asia Cup Qualifier tournament. Hong Kong won the qualifier tournament, and he was then named in Hong Kong's squad for the 2018 Asia Cup.

In December 2018, he was named in Hong Kong's team for the 2018 ACC Emerging Teams Asia Cup. In April 2019, he was named in Hong Kong's squad for the 2019 ICC World Cricket League Division Two tournament in Namibia.

In June 2019, he was selected to play for the Edmonton Royals franchise team in the 2019 Global T20 Canada tournament.

In September 2019, he was named in Hong Kong's squad for the 2019 ICC T20 World Cup Qualifier tournament in the United Arab Emirates. However, ahead of the 2019–20 Oman Pentangular Series, Nawaz and his brother Tanveer Ahmed, both withdrew from selection consideration for Hong Kong and were released from their Cricket Hong Kong contracts.
