= Kyle Christie =

Hong Kong cricketer

Personal information
- Born: 20 April 1993 (age 33); Hong Kong
- Batting: Right-handed
- Bowling: Right-arm medium-fast
- Role: Bowler

International information
- National side: Hong Kong
- Only ODI (cap 38): 6 November 2016 v PNG
- T20I debut (cap 26): 5 October 2019 v Oman
- Last T20I: 30 October 2019 v Oman

Career statistics
Competition	ODI	T20I	FC	LA
Matches	1	11	1	2
Runs scored	0	15	15	6
Batting average	0.00	7.50	7.5	3.00
100s/50s	0/0	0/0	0/0	0/0
Top score	0	11*	13	6
Balls bowled	6	234	108	54
Wickets	0	10	1	1
Bowling average	–	29.20	90.00	46.00
5 wickets in innings	0	0	0	0
10 wickets in match	0	0	0	0
Best bowling	0/18	2/23	1/90	1/28
Catches/stumpings	0/–	4/–	0/–	1/–
- Source: ESPNcricinfo, 6 January 2020

Kyle Christie is a Hong Kong cricketer. In 2016, Christie responded to an advert that Cricket Hong Kong posted on Facebook for Hong Kong-born cricketers who are overseas. Later that year, he made his international debut for the Hong Kong national cricket team.

He made his One Day International (ODI) debut against Papua New Guinea on 6 November 2016. He made his first-class debut for Hong Kong against Afghanistan in the 2015–17 ICC Intercontinental Cup on 20 October 2017.

In September 2019, he was named in Hong Kong's Twenty20 International (T20I) squad for the 2019–20 Oman Pentangular Series, and the 2019 ICC T20 World Cup Qualifier tournament in the United Arab Emirates. He made his T20I debut for Hong Kong, against Oman, on 5 October 2019.
