= Hassan Khan Mohammad =

Hong Kong cricketer (born 2000)

Personal information
- Born: 6 September 2000 (age 26); Texas, United States
- Role: Bowler

International information
- National side: Hong Kong
- Only T20I (cap 36): 24 February 2020 v Malaysia
- Source: Cricinfo, 24 February 2020

Hassan Khan Mohammad (born 6 September 2000) is a Hong Kong cricketer. In November 2019, he was named in Hong Kong's squad for the 2019 ACC Emerging Teams Asia Cup in Bangladesh. He made his List A debut for Hong Kong, against India, in the Emerging Teams Cup on 18 November 2019. Later the same month, he was named in Hong Kong's squad for the Cricket World Cup Challenge League B tournament in Oman.

He was a member of Hong Kong's Twenty20 International (T20I) squad for the 2020 Interport T20I Series against Malaysia. He made his T20I debut against Malaysia, on 24 February 2020. He had also previously played for the Hong Kong Under-19 National cricket-team at the 2018 ACC Under-19 Asia Cup and the Asian Cricket Council's Eastern Region tournament in July 2019.
