= Aarush Bhagwat =

Hong Kong cricketer (born 2003)

Personal information
- Born: 12 September 2003 (age 23); Kwun Tong, Hong Kong
- Height: 1.72 m (5 ft 8 in)
- Batting: Right-handed
- Role: Wicket keeper

International information
- National side: Hong Kong
- T20I debut (cap 25): 5 October 2019 v Oman
- Last T20I: 23 October 2019 v Jersey

Career statistics
Competition	T20I	LA
Matches	4	6
Runs scored	5	30
Batting average	1.25	7.5
100s/50s	0/0	0/0
Top score	3	22
Catches/stumpings	2/0	3/0
- Source: Cricinfo, 6 January 2020

Aarush Bhagwat (born 12 September 2003) is a Hong Kong cricketer. He was a member of Hong Kong's Twenty20 International (T20I) squads for the 2019–20 Oman Pentangular Series and the 2019 ICC T20 World Cup Qualifier tournament in the United Arab Emirates. He made his T20I debut for Hong Kong, against Oman, on 5 October 2019.

In November 2019, he was named in Hong Kong's squad for the 2019 ACC Emerging Teams Asia Cup in Bangladesh. He made his List A debut for Hong Kong, against India, in the Emerging Teams Cup on 18 November 2019. Later the same month, he was named in Hong Kong's squad for the Cricket World Cup Challenge League B tournament in Oman. Prior to his international debut, he had also played for the Hong Kong Under-19 National cricket-team at the 2018 ACC Under-19 Asia Cup and the Asian Cricket Council's Eastern Region tournament in July 2019. He was also a part of the Hong Kong Under-16 Cricket Team at the 2019 ACC Under-16 Eastern Region Asia Cup.
