= Faizan Asif =

Emirati cricketer (born 1992)

Personal information
- Born: 21 December 1992 (age 33); Islamabad, Pakistan
- Batting: Left-handed

International information
- National side: United Arab Emirates
- T20I debut (cap 3): 17 March 2014 v Netherlands
- Last T20I: 12 July 2015 v Netherlands
- Source: ESPNcricinfo, 28 October 2019

Faizan Asif (born 21 December 1992) is a Pakistani-born cricketer who played for the United Arab Emirates national cricket team. He made his Twenty20 International debut for the United Arab Emirates against the Netherlands on 17 March 2014. In October 2019, he was added to the UAE's squad for the 2019 ICC T20 World Cup Qualifier tournament, replacing Ashfaq Ahmed.
