= Ahsan Abbasi =

Hong Kong cricketer (born 1994)

Personal information
- Born: 24 August 1994 (age 32); Rawalpindi, Punjab, Pakistan
- Batting: Right-handed

International information
- National side: Hong Kong
- T20I debut (cap 24): 5 October 2019 v Oman
- Last T20I: 24 October 2019 v Canada

Career statistics
Competition	T20I	LA
Matches	6	10
Runs scored	80	132
Batting average	13.33	13.20
100s/50s	0/0	0/0
Top score	18	37
Balls bowled	–	76
Wickets	–	2
Bowling average	–	38.50
5 wickets in innings	–	0
10 wickets in match	–	0
Best bowling	–	1/27
Catches/stumpings	0/–	0/–
- Source: Cricinfo, 6 January 2020

Ahsan Abbasi (born 24 August 1994) is a Pakistani-born Hong Kong cricketer. In April 2019, he was named in Hong Kong's squad for the 2019 ICC World Cricket League Division Two tournament in Namibia. He made his List A debut for Hong Kong against Canada in the 2019 ICC World Cricket League Division Two tournament on 20 April 2019.

Prior to his List A debut, Abbasi was named in Hong Kong's squad for the 2018 Cricket World Cup Qualifier tournament in Zimbabwe. However, he was ruled out of the tournament due to a knee injury he picked up in a warm-up game.

In September 2019, he was named in Hong Kong's Twenty20 International (T20I) squad for the 2019–20 Oman Pentangular Series, and the 2019 ICC T20 World Cup Qualifier tournament in the United Arab Emirates. He made his T20I debut for Hong Kong, against Oman, on 5 October 2019.

In November 2019, he was named in Hong Kong's squad for the 2019 ACC Emerging Teams Asia Cup in Bangladesh. Later the same month, he was named in Hong Kong's squad for the Cricket World Cup Challenge League B tournament in Oman.
