= Simandeep Singh =

Hong Kong cricketer (born 1995)

Personal information
- Full name: Simandeep Pansotra Singh
- Born: 20 June 1995 (age 31); Hong Kong
- Batting: Right-handed
- Role: Middle-order batsman

International information
- National side: Hong Kong
- Only ODI (cap 41): 17 March 2018 v Papua New Guinea
- T20I debut (cap 32): 18 October 2019 v Ireland
- Last T20I: 30 October 2019 v Oman

Career statistics
Competition	ODI	T20I	LA
Matches	1	7	3
Runs scored	0	33	5
Batting average	0.00	6.60	1.66
100s/50s	0/0	0/0	0/0
Top score	0	14*	3
Catches/stumpings	0/–	4/–	0/–
- Source: Cricinfo, 30 November 2019

Simandeep Singh (born 20 June 1995) is a Hong Kong cricketer. He made his List A debut for Hong Kong against Nepal in the 2018 Cricket World Cup Qualifier on 12 March 2018. He made his One Day International (ODI) debut against Papua New Guinea in the World Cup Qualifier tournament's ninth-place playoff match on 17 March 2018.

In September 2019, he was named in Hong Kong's squad for the 2019 ICC T20 World Cup Qualifier tournament in the United Arab Emirates. He made his Twenty20 International (T20I) debut for Hong Kong, against Ireland, on 18 October 2019.
