= Anuj Rawat =

Indian cricketer (born 1999)

Personal information
- Born: 17 October 1999 (age 27); Ramnagar, Uttarakhand, India
- Height: 1.73 m (5 ft 8 in)
- Batting: Left-handed
- Role: Wicket-keeper-batter

Domestic team information
- Years: Team
- 2017–present: Delhi
- 2021: Rajasthan Royals
- 2022–2024: Royal Challengers Bengaluru
- 2025–present: Gujarat Titans

Career statistics
Competition	FC	LA	T20
Matches	38	32	77
Runs scored	1,564	888	1,304
Batting average	28.43	42.88	25.07
100s/50s	3/6	0/8	0/5
Top score	134	95*	88*
Catches/stumpings	95/15	43/7	64/12
Medal record
Men's cricket
Representing India
ACC U19 Asia Cup
Winner	2018 Bangladesh
- Source: ESPNcricinfo, 25 December 2025

Anuj Rawat (born 17 October 1999) is an Indian cricketer who represents Delhi in domestic cricket and Gujarat Titans in Indian Premier League. He is a left-handed top order batsman and wicket-keeper.

He made his first-class debut for Delhi in the 2017–18 Ranji Trophy on 6 October 2017. He made his Twenty20 debut for Delhi in the 2018–19 Syed Mushtaq Ali Trophy on 21 February 2019. He made his List A debut on 4 October 2019, for Delhi in the 2019–20 Vijay Hazare Trophy.

In the 2020 IPL auction, he was bought by the Rajasthan Royals ahead of the 2020 Indian Premier League. In February 2022, he was bought by the Royal Challengers Bangalore in the 2022 Indian Premier League.
