= Tanwir Afzal =

Hong Kong cricketer

Personal information
- Full name: Tanvir Afzal
- Born: 12 June 1988 (age 38); Gujrat, Pakistan
- Batting: Right-handed
- Bowling: Right arm fast-medium
- Role: All-rounder

International information
- National side: Hong Kong (2013–2019)
- ODI debut (cap 26): 1 May 2014 v Afghanistan
- Last ODI: 18 September 2018 v India
- T20I debut (cap 10): 16 March 2014 v Nepal
- Last T20I: 5 September 2016 v Ireland

Career statistics
Competition	ODI	T20I	FC	LA
Matches	20	21	4	40
Runs scored	292	219	215	550
Batting average	18.25	13.68	30.71	17.74
100s/50s	0/1	0/1	1/1	0/1
Top score	73	56	104	73
Balls bowled	852	426	712	1,802
Wickets	19	19	16	41
Bowling average	31.63	26.78	23.25	29.31
5 wickets in innings	0	0	0	1
10 wickets in match	0	0	0	0
Best bowling	3/20	2/8	4/63	5/17
Catches/stumpings	3/–	4/–	0/–	6/–
- Source: ESPNcricinfo, 28 September 2021

Tanwir Afzal (born 12 June 1988) is a Hong Kong cricketer. He played for Hong Kong in the 2014 ICC World Twenty20 tournament. He made his One Day International debut against Afghanistan in the 2014 ACC Premier League on 1 May 2014.

In May 2015 he was named as the captain of the Hong Kong squad for the 2015 ICC World Twenty20 Qualifier after James Atkinson resigned from the post.

In August 2018, he was named in Hong Kong's squad for the 2018 Asia Cup Qualifier tournament. Hong Kong won the qualifier tournament, and he was then named in Hong Kong's squad for the 2018 Asia Cup.

In December 2018, he was named in Hong Kong's team for the 2018 ACC Emerging Teams Asia Cup. In April 2019, he was named in Hong Kong's squad for the 2019 ICC World Cricket League Division Two tournament in Namibia. Previously, he has represented Pakistan at Under-19 level.
