= Scott McKechnie =

English cricketer (born 1991)

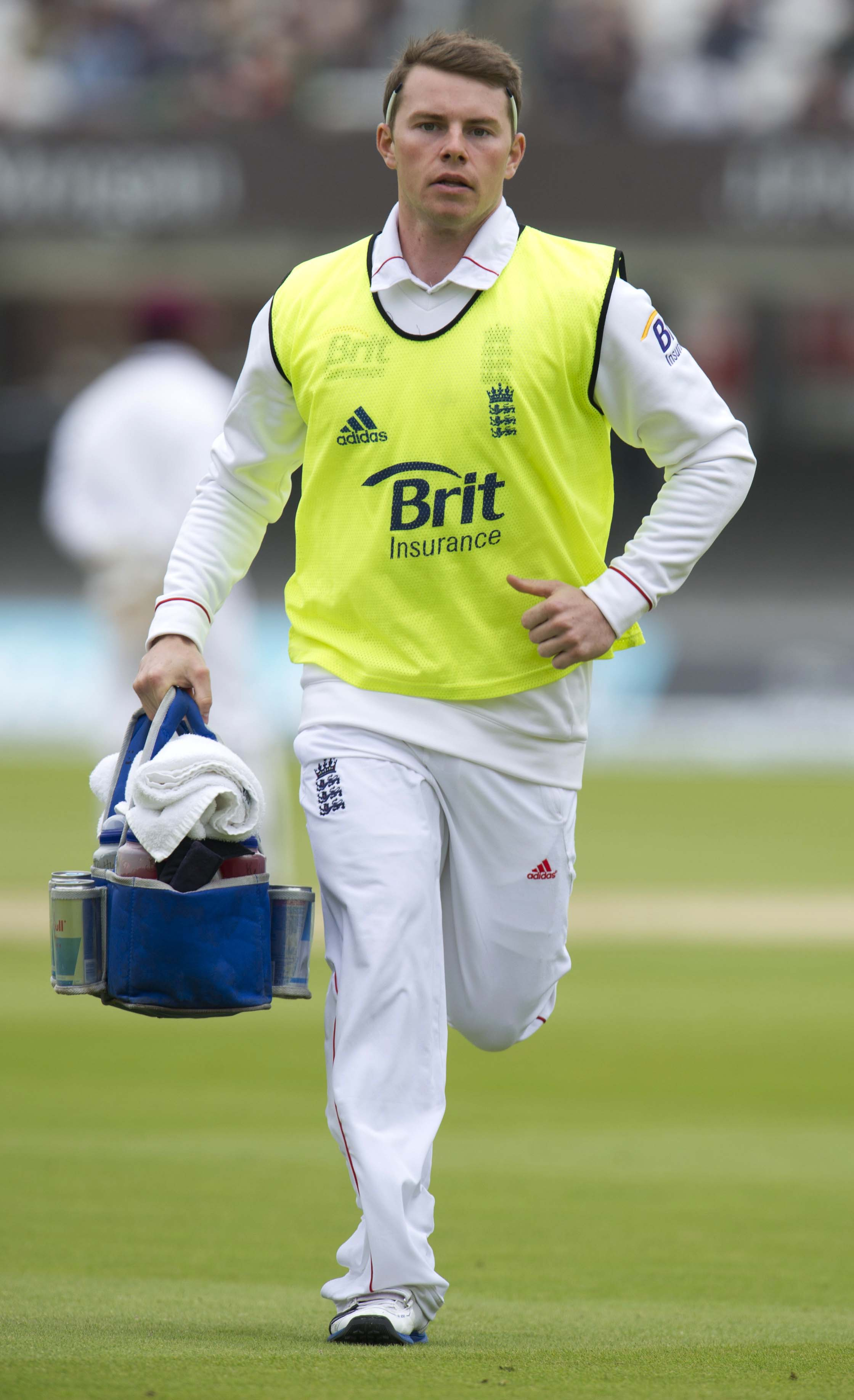

Personal information
- Full name: Scott Stephen McKechnie
- Born: 6 August 1991 (age 35); Salford, England
- Batting: Right-handed
- Role: Batsman, wicket-keeper

International information
- National side: Hong Kong (2017–present)
- ODI debut (cap 40): 6 December 2017 v PNG
- Last ODI: 18 September 2018 v India
- ODI shirt no.: 40
- T20I debut (cap 28): 5 October 2019 v Oman
- Last T20I: 2 September 2022 v Pakistan

Career statistics
Competition	ODI	T20I	LA	T20
Matches	8	29	16	29
Runs scored	108	264	248	264
Batting average	15.42	17.60	19.07	17.60
100s/50s	0/0	0/0	0/0	0/0
Top score	29	44	37	44
Catches/stumpings	8/1	13/9	19/3	13/9
- Source: Cricinfo, 3 September 2022

Scott McKechnie (born 6 August 1991) is an English-born cricketer who plays for the Hong Kong cricket team.

He made his One Day International (ODI) debut for Hong Kong against Papua New Guinea in the 2015–17 ICC World Cricket League Championship on 6 December 2017. In August 2018, he was named in Hong Kong's squad for the 2018 Asia Cup Qualifier tournament. Hong Kong won the qualifier tournament, and he was then named in Hong Kong's squad for the 2018 Asia Cup.

In April 2019, he was named in Hong Kong's squad for the 2019 ICC World Cricket League Division Two tournament in Namibia. In September 2019, he was named in Hong Kong's Twenty20 International (T20I) squad for the 2019–20 Oman Pentangular Series, and the 2019 ICC T20 World Cup Qualifier tournament in the United Arab Emirates. He made his T20I debut against Oman, on 5 October 2019.

On 8 March 2020, McKechnie announced his retirement from international cricket. However, in July 2022, he was named in Hong Kong's squad for the 2022 ICC Men's T20 World Cup Global Qualifier B tournament in Zimbabwe.
