= Waqas Khan =

Hong Kong cricketer (born 1999)

Personal information
- Born: 10 March 1999 (age 27)
- Batting: Right-handed
- Bowling: Right-arm medium-fast
- Role: Batsman
- Relatives: Sarfaraz Khan (brother)

International information
- National side: Hong Kong (2014–present)
- ODI debut (cap 33): 18 November 2015 v UAE
- Last ODI: 8 December 2017 v Papua New Guinea
- T20I debut (cap 16): 24 November 2014 v Nepal
- Last T20I: 6 March 2020 v Malaysia

Career statistics
| Competition | ODI | T20I | LA | T20 |
|---|---|---|---|---|
| Matches | 8 | 16 | 12 | 17 |
| Runs scored | 67 | 164 | 106 | 166 |
| Batting average | 16.75 | 16.39 | 15.14 | 16.60 |
| 100s/50s | 0/0 | 0/1 | 0/0 | 0/1 |
| Top score | 35* | 60 | 35* | 60 |
| Balls bowled | – | 6 | 6 | 30 |
| Wickets | – | 0 | 0 | 1 |
| Bowling average | – | – | – | 42.00 |
| 5 wickets in innings | – | – | – | 0 |
| 10 wickets in match | – | – | – | 0 |
| Best bowling | – | – | – | 1/30 |
| Catches/stumpings | 0/– | 1/– | 3/– | 1/– |
- Source: Cricinfo, 28 September 2021

Waqas Khan (born 10 March 1999) is a Hong Kong cricketer. He made his Twenty20 International (T20I) debut for Hong Kong against Nepal in Sri Lanka on 24 November 2014. At the age of 15 years and 259 days, he became the youngest person to play in a T20I match. He made his One Day International (ODI) debut against the United Arab Emirates in the 2015–17 ICC World Cricket League Championship on 18 November 2015. He made his first-class cricket debut against Ireland in the 2015–17 ICC Intercontinental Cup on 30 August 2016.

In August 2018, he was named in Hong Kong's squad for the 2018 Asia Cup Qualifier tournament. Hong Kong won the qualifier tournament, and he was then named in Hong Kong's squad for the 2018 Asia Cup.

In December 2018, he was named in Hong Kong's team for the 2018 ACC Emerging Teams Asia Cup. In September 2019, he was named in Hong Kong's squad for the 2019 ICC T20 World Cup Qualifier tournament in the United Arab Emirates.
