= Haroon Arshad =

Hong Kong cricketer (born 1999)

Personal information
- Born: 6 September 1999 (age 27); Brooklyn, New York, United States
- Batting: Right-handed
- Bowling: Right-arm medium fast
- Role: Bowler

International information
- National side: Hong Kong
- T20I debut (cap 27): 5 October 2019 v Oman
- Last T20I: 12 March 2023 v Malaysia

Career statistics
Competition	T20I	FC	LA
Matches	24	1	15
Runs scored	320	0	204
Batting average	22.85	0.00	18.54
100s/50s	0/1	0/0	0/0
Top score	68	0	37
Balls bowled	285	54	268
Wickets	14	0	11
Bowling average	28.21	-	20.90
5 wickets in innings	1	0	1
10 wickets in match	0	0	0
Best bowling	5/16	0/42	7/31
Catches/stumpings	0/–	0/–	2/–
- Source: Cricinfo, 16 March 2023

Haroon Arshad (born 6 September 1999) is an American-born Hong Kong cricketer. He made his first-class debut for Hong Kong in the 2015–17 ICC Intercontinental Cup on 20 October 2017.

In August 2018, he was named in Hong Kong's squad for the 2018 Asia Cup Qualifier tournament, but was not picked in the playing eleven. Hong Kong won the qualifier tournament, and he was then named in Hong Kong's squad for the 2018 Asia Cup, and again was not included in the final team.

He was the leading run-scorer for Hong Kong in the 2018 ACC Under-19 Asia Cup, with 52 runs in three matches. Arshad was a member of the Hong Kong Twenty20 International (T20I) squad for the 2019–20 Oman Pentangular Series, and the 2019 ICC T20 World Cup Qualifier tournament in the United Arab Emirates. He made his T20I debut for Hong Kong, against Oman, on 5 October 2019. Ahead of the T20 qualifier tournament, the International Cricket Council (ICC) named him as the player to watch in Hong Kong's squad.

In November 2019, he was named in Hong Kong's squad for the 2019 ACC Emerging Teams Asia Cup in Bangladesh. He made his List A debut for Hong Kong, against Bangladesh, in the Emerging Teams Cup on 14 November 2019. Later that same month, he was named in Hong Kong's squad for the Cricket World Cup Challenge League B tournament in Oman.

On 1 March 2020, in the Eastern Region group match against Nepal in the 2020 Asia Cup Qualifier tournament, he became the first bowler for Hong Kong to take a five-wicket haul in a T20I match. In May 2022, he was named in Hong Kong's side for the 2022 Uganda Cricket World Cup Challenge League B tournament.
