= Nasrulla Rana =

Hong Kong cricketer (born 2002)

Personal information
- Born: 11 September 2002 (age 24); Hong Kong
- Batting: Right-handed
- Bowling: Right-arm medium fast
- Role: Bowler

International information
- National side: Hong Kong
- T20I debut (cap 29): 5 October 2019 v Oman
- Last T20I: 13 November 2025 v Qatar

Career statistics
Competition	T20I	LA	T20
Matches	56	12	59
Runs scored	258	85	261
Batting average	12.90	12.14	12.42
100s/50s	0/0	0/0	0/0
Top score	36*	25	36*
Balls bowled	758	483	812
Wickets	45	17	46
Bowling average	23.57	32.52	25.00
5 wickets in innings	1	1	1
10 wickets in match	0	0	0
Best bowling	6/12	5/46	6/12
Catches/stumpings	15/–	6/–	17/–
- Source: Cricinfo, 31 July 2025

Nasrulla Rana (born 11 September 2002) is a Hong Kong cricketer. In September 2019, he was named in Hong Kong's Twenty20 International (T20I) squads for the 2019–20 Oman Pentangular Series and the 2019 ICC T20 World Cup Qualifier tournament in the United Arab Emirates. He made his T20I debut for Hong Kong, against Oman, on 5 October 2019.

He was a member of Hong Kong's squad for the 2019 ACC Emerging Teams Asia Cup in Bangladesh, and made his List A debut against Nepal, in the same tournament. Later the same month, he was named in Hong Kong's squad for the Cricket World Cup Challenge League B tournament in Oman. Prior to his international debut, he had also previously played for the Hong Kong Under-19 National cricket-team at the 2018 ACC Under-19 Asia Cup in September and October 2018 and the Asian Cricket Council's Eastern Region tournament in July 2019.
