= 2019 Men's T20 World Cup Qualifier =

Cricket tournament

2019 ICC Men's T20 World Cup Qualifier
- Dates: 18 October – 2 November 2019
- Administrator: International Cricket Council
- Cricket format: Twenty20 International
- Tournament format(s): Round-robin, Playoffs
- Host: United Arab Emirates
- Champions: Netherlands (3rd title)
- Runners-up: Papua New Guinea
- Participants: 14
- Matches: 51
- Player of the series: (Namibia) Gerhard Erasmus
- Most runs: (Ireland) Paul Stirling (291)
- Most wickets: (Oman) Bilal Khan (18)

The 2019 ICC Men's T20 World Cup Qualifier was a cricket tournament held during October and November 2019 in the United Arab Emirates to determine the teams that would qualify for the 2021 ICC Men's T20 World Cup tournament. The six teams finishing highest in the qualifier tournament joined Sri Lanka and Bangladesh in the first group stage of the 2020 ICC Men's T20 World Cup. The tournament formed part of the ICC T20 World Cup Qualifier series, with the Netherlands winning the final.

In April 2018, the International Cricket Council (ICC) granted full international status to Twenty20 men's matches played between member sides from 1 January 2019 onwards. Therefore, all the matches in the Regional Finals and the Qualifier itself, were played as full Twenty20 Internationals (T20Is). In July 2019, the ICC suspended Zimbabwe Cricket, with the team barred from taking part in ICC events, over "government interference". The following month, the ICC named Nigeria as Zimbabwe's replacement in the tournament.

Papua New Guinea were the first team to qualify for the 2020 ICC Men's T20 World Cup from the tournament, after they won Group A, finishing above the Netherlands on net run rate. It was the first time that Papua New Guinea had qualified for a World Cup in any format. Ireland became the second team to qualify when they won Group B, also on net run rate. Both teams also advanced to the playoff section of the qualifier. They were joined by the Netherlands, Namibia and Scotland from Group A, and Oman, the United Arab Emirates and Hong Kong from Group B.

In the first qualifier match in the playoffs, the Netherlands qualified for the T20 World Cup when they beat the United Arab Emirates by eight wickets, after the UAE only scored 80 runs in their innings. The second qualifier match saw Namibia advance to their first T20 World Cup after beating Oman by 54 runs. Scotland beat tournament hosts the United Arab Emirates in the third qualifier by 90 runs to secure their place in the Men's T20 World Cup. The final qualifier match saw Oman become the last team to qualify for the Men's T20 World Cup, after they narrowly beat Hong Kong by 12 runs.

Scotland beat Oman by five wickets to win the fifth-place playoff match. In the first semi-final, the Netherlands beat Ireland by 21 runs to advance to the final. They were joined in the final with Papua New Guinea, after they beat Namibia by 18 runs in the second semi-final. Ireland beat Namibia by 27 runs to win the third-place playoff. The final saw the Netherlands beat Papua New Guinea by seven wickets to win the tournament. Namibia's captain, Gerhard Erasmus, was named the player of the tournament.

== Teams and qualifications ==
Sub-regional qualification groups began on 26 February 2018 in Argentina. In the Americas group, both the Cayman Islands and Bermuda registered wins against Argentina. A total of 61 Associate Member teams out of originally scheduled 62 teams competed. (Note: Zambia were originally scheduled to compete in the Southern sub region group in the Africa Qualifier, but later withdrew.) Of these teams, 25 of them progressed to the regional finals in 2019, with the top seven (Note: The United Arab Emirates initially qualified to the Asia Regional Final, but later automatically progressed to the qualifier tournament as the host.) teams progressing to the qualifier tournament. They were joined by the top six teams from the 2015 qualifier that were outside the top ten places in the ICC T20I Championship by the cut-off date of 31 December 2018, and the tournament host.

Means of qualification	Date	Host	Berths	Qualified
Automatic qualifications
ICC T20I Championship (Ranked 11th – 16th who played in the last WT20)	31 December 2018	Ranking table	5	Scotland; ~~Zimbabwe~~; Netherlands; Hong Kong; Oman; Ireland
Host			1	United Arab Emirates
Regional qualifications
East Asia-Pacific	22–24 March 2019	Papua New Guinea	1	Papua New Guinea
Africa	20–24 May 2019	Uganda	3	Namibia; Kenya; Nigeria
Europe	15–20 June 2019	Guernsey	1	Jersey
Asia	22–28 July 2019	Singapore	1	Singapore
Americas	18–25 August 2019	Bermuda	2	Canada; Bermuda
Total			14	

=== ICC T20I Championship ===
Host nation, Australia, and the nine best teams (according to the ICC T20I Championship ranking of 31 December 2018) who played in the last edition of ICC Men's T20 World Cup qualified for the final tournament directly. The remaining six entrants from the last tournament competed in the Regional Qualifiers of the World Cup qualifying tournaments. Of the teams in the ICC T20I Championship ranking, initially the United Arab Emirates and Nepal could only qualify through regional competitions. However, in March 2019, the ICC announced that the UAE would host the qualifier tournament, resulting in their automatic qualification. Later the same month, the ICC released the match schedule for all the Regional Finals, with the UAE omitted from the fixture list for the Asia Regional Final. The number of teams that could qualify from the Asia Regional Final was also reduced from two to one.

The final rankings for automatic qualification as of 31 December 2018 were as follows:

Rank	Team	Matches	Points	Rating	Status
1	Pakistan	36	4,979	138	Advanced to final tournament Super 12s stage
2	India	42	5,298	126	Advanced to final tournament Super 12s stage
3	England	22	2,586	118	Advanced to final tournament Super 12s stage
4	Australia	28	3,266	117	Final tournament host (and Super 12s stage)
5	South Africa	22	2,502	114	Advanced to final tournament Super 12s stage
6	New Zealand	25	2,803	112	Advanced to final tournament Super 12s stage
7	West Indies	27	2,725	101	Advanced to final tournament Super 12s stage
8	Afghanistan	27	2,490	92	Advanced to final tournament Super 12s stage
9	Sri Lanka	29	2,518	87	Advanced to final tournament group stage
10	Bangladesh	30	2,321	77	Advanced to final tournament group stage
11	Scotland	15	927	62	Advanced to Men's T20 World Cup qualifier
12	Zimbabwe	20	1,097	55	Advanced to Men's T20 World Cup qualifier
13	United Arab Emirates	13	649	50	Advanced to Men's T20 World Cup qualifier as host
14	Netherlands	12	598	50	Advanced to Men's T20 World Cup qualifier
15	Hong Kong	10	420	42	Advanced to Men's T20 World Cup qualifier
16	Oman	7	270	39	Advanced to Men's T20 World Cup qualifier
17	Ireland	19	638	34	Advanced to Men's T20 World Cup qualifier
Reference: ICC rankings for Tests, ODIs, Twenty20 & Women ICC page, 31 December 2018
"Matches" is the number of matches played in the 20 months since 1 May 2017, plus half the number in the 24 months before that.

=== Regional qualifications ===
62 teams were originally scheduled to compete in 12 regional qualification groups during 2018 across five regions, with 61 taking part. The top 25 teams progressed to five regional finals in 2019, with eight teams progressing to the 2019 qualifier tournament. The host nation of each sub-regional group and regional final groups are shown in bold. All the sub-regional stage matches in the European section were held in the Netherlands.

Regional		Sub Regional	
Asia Qualifier	Nepal, **Singapore**, Malaysia; United Arab Emirates, Qatar, Kuwait	Eastern	Nepal, **Malaysia**, Singapore, Bhutan, China, Myanmar, Thailand
Asia Qualifier	Nepal, **Singapore**, Malaysia; United Arab Emirates, Qatar, Kuwait	Western	United Arab Emirates, Qatar, **Kuwait**, Bahrain, Maldives, Saudi Arabia
Europe Qualifier	Denmark, Germany; Italy, Jersey; Norway, **Guernsey**	Group A	Denmark, Germany, France, Austria, Cyprus, Portugal
Europe Qualifier	Denmark, Germany; Italy, Jersey; Norway, **Guernsey**	Group B	Jersey, Italy, Belgium, Spain, Isle of Man, Finland
Europe Qualifier	Denmark, Germany; Italy, Jersey; Norway, **Guernsey**	Group C	Sweden, Norway, Guernsey, Gibraltar, Israel, Czech Republic
Africa Qualifier	Ghana, Nigeria; Kenya, **Uganda**; Botswana, Namibia	North-Western	**Nigeria**, Sierra Leone, Ghana, Gambia
Africa Qualifier	Ghana, Nigeria; Kenya, **Uganda**; Botswana, Namibia	Eastern	**Rwanda**, Kenya, Uganda, Tanzania
Africa Qualifier	Ghana, Nigeria; Kenya, **Uganda**; Botswana, Namibia	Southern	**Botswana**, Namibia, Lesotho, Malawi, Mozambique, Saint Helena, Eswatini
Americas Qualifier	**Bermuda**, Cayman Islands; United States, Canada	Southern	**Argentina**, Bermuda, Cayman Islands
Americas Qualifier	**Bermuda**, Cayman Islands; United States, Canada	Northern	**United States**, Canada, Panama, Belize
EAP Qualifier	**Papua New Guinea**, Vanuatu; Philippines	Group A	Papua New Guinea, Vanuatu, **Fiji**, Western Samoa
EAP Qualifier	**Papua New Guinea**, Vanuatu; Philippines	Group B	Indonesia, **Philippines**, Japan, South Korea

== Squads ==
Bermuda	Canada	Hong Kong	Ireland	Jersey	Kenya	Namibia
Dion Stovell (c); Terryn Fray (vc); Okera Bascome; Onias Bascome; Oronde Bascome; Derrick Brangman; Deunte Darrell; Allan Douglas; Malachi Jones; Kamau Leverock; George O'Brien; Delray Rawlins; Macai Simmons; Sinclair Smith; Charles Trott; Rodney Trott; Janeiro Tucker	Navneet Dhaliwal (c); Rizwan Cheema; Nikhil Dutta; Romesh Eranga; Jeremy Gordon; Dillon Heyliger; Abraash Khan; Nicholas Kirton; Nitish Kumar; Junaid Siddiqui; Ravinderpal Singh; Hamza Tariq (wk); Rodrigo Thomas; Srimantha Wijeratne; Saad Bin Zafar	Aizaz Khan (c); Kinchit Shah (vc); Ahsan Abbasi; Haroon Arshad; Waqas Barkat; Aarush Bhagwat; Kyle Christie; Mohammad Ghazanfar; Raag Kapur; Ehsan Khan; Nizakat Khan; Scott McKechnie (wk); Nasrulla Rana; Simandeep Singh; Shahid Wasif	Gary Wilson (c); Mark Adair; Andrew Balbirnie; David Delany; Gareth Delany; George Dockrell; Shane Getkate; Barry McCarthy; Kevin O'Brien; Boyd Rankin; Simi Singh; Paul Stirling; Harry Tector; Stuart Thompson; Lorcan Tucker; Craig Young	Charles Perchard (c); Corey Bisson; Dominic Blampied; Harrison Carlyon; Jake Dunford (wk); Nicholas Ferraby; Nick Greenwood; Anthony Hawkins-Kay; Jonty Jenner; Elliot Miles; Rhys Palmer; William Robertson; Ben Stevens; Julius Sumerauer; Benjamin Ward	Shem Ngoche (c); Sachin Bhudia; Emmanuel Bundi; Aman Gandhi; Dhiren Gondaria; Irfan Karim; Pushpak Kerai; Jasraj Kundi; Alex Obanda; Collins Obuya; Nelson Odhiambo; Lucas Oluoch; Elijah Otieno; Rakep Patel; Rushab Patel	Gerhard Erasmus (c); Jan Frylinck (vc); Stephan Baard; Karl Birkenstock; Niko Davin; Zane Green; Zhivago Groenewald; Jean-Pierre Kotze; Tangeni Lungameni; Bernard Scholtz; Ben Shikongo; JJ Smit; Christi Viljoen; Pikky Ya France; Craig Williams
Netherlands	Nigeria	Oman	Papua New Guinea	Scotland	Singapore	United Arab Emirates
Pieter Seelaar (c); Colin Ackermann; Philippe Boissevain; Ben Cooper; Ryan ten Doeschate; Scott Edwards (wk); Brandon Glover; Timm van der Gugten; Fred Klaassen; Paul van Meekeren; Roelof van der Merwe; Max O'Dowd; Shane Snater; Antonius Staal; Tobias Visee	Ademola Onikoyi (c); Sylvester Okpe (vc); Abiodun Abioye; Sesan Adedeji; Vincent Adewoye; Daniel Ajekun; Chima Akachukwu; Daniel Gim; Segun Ogundipe; Isaac Okpe; Chimezie Onwuzulike; Leke Oyede; Sulaimon Runsewe; Mohameed Taiwo; Gershon Yusuf	Zeeshan Maqsood (c); Aqib Ilyas (vc); Khawar Ali; Fayyaz Butt; Sandeep Goud; Aamir Kaleem; Kaleemullah; Bilal Khan; Mehran Khan; Suraj Kumar (wk); Naseem Khushi; Mohammad Nadeem; Khurram Nawaz; Jay Odedra; Jatinder Singh	Assad Vala (c); Charles Amini (vc); Simon Atai; Sese Bau; Kiplin Doriga; Riley Hekure; Hiri Hiri; Jason Kila; Nosaina Pokana; Damien Ravu; John Reva; Lega Siaka; Chad Soper; Norman Vanua; Tony Ura	Kyle Coetzer (c); Richie Berrington; Dylan Budge; Matthew Cross (wk); Josh Davey; Alasdair Evans; Ollie Hairs; Michael Leask; Calum MacLeod; George Munsey; Adrian Neill; Safyaan Sharif; Tom Sole; Hamza Tahir; Craig Wallace; Mark Watt	Amjad Mahboob (c); Aahan Gopinath Achar; Vinoth Baskaran; Surendran Chandramohan; Tim David; Avi Dixit; Aritra Dutta; Rezza Gaznavi; ~~Anantha Krishna~~; Navin Param; Janak Prakash; Rohan Rangarajan; Manpreet Singh (wk); Sidhant Singh; Aryaman Sunil; Selladore Vijayakumar	Ahmed Raza (c); Ashfaq Ahmed; Sultan Ahmed; Waheed Ahmed; Vriitya Aravind; Faizan Asif; Mohammad Boota; Darius D'Silva; Zawar Farid; Imran Haider; Zahoor Khan; Rohan Mustafa; Ghulam Shabber (wk); Rameez Shahzad; Junaid Sidique; Chirag Suri; Muhammad Usman

=== UAE squad ===
Ahead of the tournament, Mohammad Naveed was withdrawn from the UAE's squad, with Ahmed Raza named as captain in his place. Qadeer Ahmed and Shaiman Anwar were also dropped from the UAE's squad, with Waheed Ahmed, Darius D'Silva and Junaid Sidique added to their squad. Two days before the start of the tournament, the ICC confirmed that the three players dropped from the UAE's squad had all been suspended after they had breached cricket's anti-corruption rules. Mohammad Naveed and Shaiman Anwar were believed to be planning to fix matches in the tournament, while Qadeer Ahmed was approached to fix a match during the UAE's tour of Zimbabwe in April 2019. On 21 October 2019, Ashfaq Ahmed became the fourth UAE cricketer to be suspended by the ICC. Ahmed had played in the first two matches for the team in the tournament.

On 21 October 2019, Ghulam Shabber, the UAE's wicket-keeper, did not show up for the pre-match meeting ahead of the fixture against Hong Kong. It later transpired that Shabber had left the country without an explanation, before being traced to Pakistan. On 26 October 2019, in an interview for The National, Shabber denied any involvement with corruption and announced his retirement from cricket, citing the poor remuneration for playing. He said that "if there is something with regards to anti-corruption, I am ready to cooperate in Pakistan. But I have decided cricket is not in my future".

Following the conclusion of the group stage, the ICC's Event Technical Committee approved two replacements in the UAE's squad. Faizan Asif replaced Ashfaq Ahmed and Vriitya Aravind was named as Ghulam Shabber's replacement. On 30 October 2019, the Emirates Cricket Board (ECB) confirmed that they had suspended Shabber for absconding, and that he was part of the ICC's anti-corruption investigation. In March 2021, Mohammad Naveed and Shaiman Anwar were both found guilty of corruption, with each player given an eight-year ban from all cricket, backdated to 16 October 2019. In July 2021, the ICC also handed eight-year bans to Amir Hayat and Ashfaq Ahmed for violating the anti-corruption code. Their bans were both backdated to 13 September 2020. In September 2021, the ICC also issued a four-year ban to Ghulam Shabber, following the conclusion of their anti-corruption investigation.

=== Other changes ===
In September 2019, ahead of the 2019–20 Oman Pentangular Series, Hong Kong's Babar Hayat declared that he was no longer available to play for Hong Kong. Brothers Tanveer Ahmed and Ehsan Nawaz also withdrew themselves for selection.

Anantha Krishna was ruled out of Singapore's squad after suffering an injury in a training session. He was replaced by Aahan Gopinath Achar. On 24 October 2019, the ICC announced that the bowling actions of Abiodun Abioye (Nigeria), Tom Sole (Scotland) and Selladore Vijayakumar (Singapore) were all found to be illegal. They were all suspended from bowling in international cricket matches until an assessment shows that their bowling action is legal.

Ahead of the playoff matches, Dylan Budge replaced Ollie Hairs in Scotland's squad, after Hairs suffered a fracture in his foot. Ireland also made a replacement, with Barry McCarthy coming into their squad, replacing David Delany, who was ruled out with a knee injury.

== Match officials ==
In October 2019, the ICC named the officials for the tournament, with G. S. Lakshmi becoming the first woman to be named as a referee at an ICC event.

=== Umpires ===
- Roland Black
- Chris Brown
- Lyndon Hannibal
- Sam Nogajski
- Ahmed Shah Pakteen
- Allahudien Paleker
- Sundaram Ravi
- Ahsan Raza
- Rashid Riaz
- Sharfuddoula
- Alex Wharf
- Raveendra Wimalasiri

=== Referees ===
The ICC also named three match referees for the tournament.

- Jeff Crowe
- G. S. Lakshmi
- Gerrie Pienaar

== Warm-up matches ==
Ahead of the main tournament, each team played two warm-up matches.

Warm-up matches

14 October 2019
10:00
Scorecard

United Arab Emirates; 157/5 (20 overs)	v	Scotland; 120/9 (20 overs)

United Arab Emirates won by 37 runs
Dubai International Cricket Stadium, Dubai

- Scotland won the toss and elected to field.

14 October 2019
10:00
Scorecard

Papua New Guinea; 97 (17.5 overs)	v	Oman; 98/6 (17.2 overs)

Oman won by 4 wickets
ICC Academy Ground, Dubai

- Papua New Guinea won the toss and elected to bat.

14 October 2019
14:10
Scorecard

Ireland; 156/8 (20 overs)	v	Netherlands; 126 (20 overs)

Ireland won by 30 runs
Dubai International Cricket Stadium, Dubai

- Netherlands won the toss and elected to field.

14 October 2019
14:10
Scorecard

Namibia; 131/8 (20 overs)	v	Hong Kong; 132/6 (19.5 overs)

Hong Kong won by 4 wickets
ICC Academy Ground, Dubai

- Namibia won the toss and elected to bat.

14 October 2019
14:10
Scorecard

Singapore; 164/5 (20 overs)	v	Canada; 165/4 (18 overs)

Canada won by 6 wickets
ICC Academy Ground No 2, Dubai

- Singapore won the toss and elected to bat.

14 October 2019
14:10
Scorecard

Kenya; 127/6 (20 overs)	v	Jersey; 131/3 (13.2 overs)

Jersey won by 7 wickets
Sheikh Zayed Cricket Stadium, Abu Dhabi

- Kenya won the toss and elected to bat.

14 October 2019
14:10
Scorecard

Bermuda; 171/5 (20 overs)	v	Nigeria; 118 (19.5 overs)

Bermuda won by 53 runs
Tolerance Oval, Abu Dhabi

- Bermuda won the toss and elected to bat.

15 October 2019
10:00
Scorecard

Nigeria; 96/9 (20 overs)	v	Namibia; 97/2 (10.1 overs)

Namibia won by 8 wickets
ICC Academy Ground No 2, Dubai

- Nigeria won the toss and elected to bat.

15 October 2019
14:10
Scorecard

Canada; 191/8 (20 overs)	v	Kenya; 165/8 (20 overs)

Canada won by 26 runs
ICC Academy Ground No 2, Dubai

- Canada won the toss and elected to bat.

15 October 2019
14:10
Scorecard

Scotland; 210/8 (20 overs)	v	Ireland; 209/9 (20 overs)

Scotland won by 1 run
Tolerance Oval, Abu Dhabi

- Scotland won the toss and elected to bat.

15 October 2019
14:10
Scorecard

Singapore; 112 (20 overs)	v	Jersey; 116/4 (19.1 overs)

Jersey won by 6 wickets
Dubai International Cricket Stadium, Dubai

- Singapore won the toss and elected to bat.

15 October 2019
14:10
Scorecard

Netherlands; 169/3 (20 overs)	v	Oman; 170/6 (19.4 overs)

Oman won by 4 wickets
Sheikh Zayed Cricket Stadium, Abu Dhabi

- Netherlands won the toss and elected to bat.

15 October 2019
19:30
Scorecard

Hong Kong; 160/5 (20 overs)	v	Bermuda; 136/8 (20 overs)

Hong Kong won by 24 runs
Dubai International Cricket Stadium, Dubai

- Hong Kong won the toss and elected to bat.

15 October 2019
19:30
Scorecard

United Arab Emirates; 193/2 (20 overs)	v	Papua New Guinea; 178/7 (20 overs)

United Arab Emirates won by 15 runs
Sheikh Zayed Cricket Stadium, Abu Dhabi

- United Arab Emirates won the toss and elected to bat.

== Group stage ==
=== Group A ===
Pos	Team	Pld	W	L	T	NR	Pts	NRR
1	Papua New Guinea	6	5	1	0	0	10	2.086
2	Netherlands	6	5	1	0	0	10	1.776
3	Namibia	6	4	2	0	0	8	1.080
4	Scotland	6	3	3	0	0	6	0.258
5	Kenya	6	2	4	0	0	4	−1.156
6	Singapore	6	2	4	0	0	4	−1.375
7	Bermuda	6	0	6	0	0	0	−2.839

Source: ESPNCricinfo

Advanced to Semifinal and 2021 Men's T20 World Cup.
Advanced to Semi-final Play-offs.
Advanced to 5th place Play-off Semi-Finals.

18 October 2019
10:00
Scorecard

Singapore; 168/6 (20 overs)	v	Scotland; 166/9 (20 overs)
Surendran Chandramohan 51 (55); Josh Davey 2/26 (4 overs)		George Munsey 46 (25); Selladore Vijayakumar 3/16 (4 overs)

Singapore won by 2 runs
ICC Academy Ground, Dubai
Umpires: Roland Black (Ire) and Ahsan Raza (Pak)
Player of the match: Selladore Vijayakumar (Sin)

- Scotland won the toss and elected to field.

18 October 2019
14:10
Scorecard

Netherlands; 166/4 (20 overs)	v	Kenya; 136/8 (20 overs)
Max O'Dowd 53 (46); Collins Obuya 2/16 (3 overs)		Collins Obuya 63 (40); Paul van Meekeren 3/27 (4 overs)

Netherlands won by 30 runs
ICC Academy Ground, Dubai
Umpires: Chris Brown (NZ) and Raveendra Wimalasiri (SL)
Player of the match: Max O'Dowd (Ned)

- Netherlands won the toss and elected to bat.
- Jasraj Kundi (Ken) made his T20I debut.

19 October 2019
10:00
Scorecard

Bermuda; 89 (17.2 overs)	v	Papua New Guinea; 90/0 (10.2 overs)
Delray Rawlins 25 (17); Norman Vanua 3/14 (2.2 overs)		Assad Vala 53* (35)

Papua New Guinea won by 10 wickets
ICC Academy Ground, Dubai
Umpires: Roland Black (Ire) and Chris Brown (NZ)
Player of the match: Norman Vanua (PNG)

- Papua New Guinea won the toss and elected to field.
- Janeiro Tucker (Ber) and Riley Hekure (PNG) both made their T20I debuts.
- Norman Vanua (PNG) took a hat-trick.

19 October 2019
14:10
Scorecard

Netherlands; 140/6 (20 overs)	v	Namibia; 96 (19 overs)
Ryan ten Doeschate 59 (40); Jan Frylinck 3/25 (4 overs)		Craig Williams 27 (23); Brandon Glover 3/15 (3 overs)

Netherlands won by 44 runs
ICC Academy Ground, Dubai
Umpires: Sharfuddoula (Ban) and Raveendra Wimalasiri (SL)
Player of the match: Ryan ten Doeschate (Ned)

- Netherlands won the toss and elected to bat.

19 October 2019
14:10
Scorecard

Scotland; 170/6 (20 overs)	v	Kenya; 139/8 (20 overs)
Tom Sole 33* (18); Collins Obuya 2/12 (3 overs)		Irfan Karim 51 (46); Richie Berrington 3/17 (3 overs)

Scotland won by 31 runs
ICC Academy Ground No 2, Dubai
Umpires: Ahmed Shah Pakteen (Afg) and Ahsan Raza (Pak)
Player of the match: Richie Berrington (Sco)

- Scotland won the toss and elected to bat.

20 October 2019
10:00
Scorecard

Papua New Guinea; 197/7 (20 overs)	v	Namibia; 116 (17.1 overs)
Tony Ura 71 (42); Jan Frylinck 3/18 (2 overs)		Christi Viljoen 17 (21); Assad Vala 3/19 (3.1 overs)

Papua New Guinea won by 81 runs
ICC Academy Ground No 2, Dubai
Umpires: Roland Black (Ire) and Ahmed Shah Pakteen (Afg)
Player of the match: Assad Vala (PNG)

- Papua New Guinea won the toss and elected to bat.

20 October 2019
14:10
Scorecard

Bermuda; 149/7 (20 overs)	v	Singapore; 152/5 (19.3 overs)
Janeiro Tucker 50* (34); Janak Prakash 3/44 (4 overs)		Navin Param 72* (41); Janeiro Tucker 1/16 (2 overs)

Singapore won by 5 wickets
ICC Academy Ground No 2, Dubai
Umpires: Chris Brown (NZ) and Sharfuddoula (Ban)
Player of the match: Navin Param (Sin)

- Bermuda won the toss and elected to bat.

21 October 2019
10:00
Scorecard

Scotland; 146/6 (20 overs)	v	Papua New Guinea; 142/9 (20 overs)
Kyle Coetzer 54 (47); Damien Ravu 1/11 (2 overs)		Norman Vanua 33 (18); Hamza Tahir 3/24 (4 overs)

Scotland won by 4 runs
ICC Academy Ground, Dubai
Umpires: Ahsan Raza (Pak) and Sharfuddoula (Ban)
Player of the match: Hamza Tahir (Sco)

- Scotland won the toss and elected to bat.

21 October 2019
14:10
Scorecard

Kenya; 138/4 (20 overs)	v	Bermuda; 93 (18.5 overs)
Dhiren Gondaria 85* (67); Kamau Leverock 2/30 (4 overs)		Delray Rawlins 37 (26); Collins Obuya 4/27 (3.5 overs)

Kenya won by 45 runs
ICC Academy Ground, Dubai
Umpires: Ahmed Shah Pakteen (Afg) and Raveendra Wimalasiri (SL)
Player of the match: Dhiren Gondaria (Ken)

- Kenya won the toss and elected to bat.
- Rushab Patel (Ken) made his T20I debut.

22 October 2019
10:00
Scorecard

Namibia; 159/6 (20 overs)	v	Scotland; 135/8 (20 overs)
JJ Smit 43 (22); Josh Davey 2/29 (3 overs)		Calum MacLeod 39 (46); Jan Frylinck 2/15 (4 overs)

Namibia won by 24 runs
ICC Academy Ground, Dubai
Umpires: Chris Brown (NZ) and Sam Nogajski (Aus)
Player of the match: JJ Smit (Nam)

- Namibia won the toss and elected to bat.

22 October 2019
14:10
Scorecard

Singapore; 101 (18.5 overs)	v	Netherlands; 104/5 (16.3 overs)
Surendran Chandramohan 28 (27); Timm van der Gugten 3/9 (3 overs)		Max O'Dowd 35 (31); Sidhant Singh 1/5 (1 over)

Netherlands won by 5 wickets
ICC Academy Ground, Dubai
Umpires: Roland Black (Ire) and Ahsan Raza (Pak)
Player of the match: Roelof van der Merwe (Ned)

- Singapore won the toss and elected to bat.

23 October 2019
10:00
Scorecard

Bermuda; 106/9 (20 overs)	v	Namibia; 111/4 (13.1 overs)
Okera Bascome 37 (31); Bernard Scholtz 3/17 (4 overs)		Niko Davin 37 (12); Kamau Leverock 3/19 (4 overs)

Namibia won by 6 wickets
ICC Academy Ground No 2, Dubai
Umpires: Allahudien Paleker (SA) and Ahsan Raza (Pak)
Player of the match: Bernard Scholtz (Nam)

- Namibia won the toss and elected to field.

23 October 2019
14:10
Scorecard

Singapore; 157/9 (20 overs)	v	Kenya; 159/3 (18.5 overs)
Surendran Chandramohan 40 (30); Lucas Oluoch 3/22 (4 overs)		Irfan Karim 71* (50); Amjad Mahboob 2/30 (4 overs)

Kenya won by 7 wickets
ICC Academy Ground No 2, Dubai
Umpires: Roland Black (Ire) and Alex Wharf (Eng)
Player of the match: Irfan Karim (Ken)

- Singapore won the toss and elected to bat.
- Aman Gandhi (Ken) and Rezza Gaznavi (Sin) both made their T20I debuts.

24 October 2019
10:00
Scorecard

Netherlands; 126/7 (20 overs)	v	Papua New Guinea; 127/5 (19 overs)
Timm van der Gugten 40* (21); Charles Amini 2/24 (4 overs)		Assad Vala 37 (38); Roelof van der Merwe 2/27 (4 overs)

Papua New Guinea won by 5 wickets
ICC Academy Ground, Dubai
Umpires: Sam Nogajski (Aus) and Alex Wharf (Eng)

- Netherlands won the toss and elected to bat.

24 October 2019
19:30 (D/N)
Scorecard

Scotland; 204/4 (20 overs)	v	Bermuda; 158/8 (20 overs)
Calum MacLeod 74 (37); Kamau Leverock 2/39 (4 overs)		Delray Rawlins 46 (21); Mark Watt 2/18 (4 overs)

Scotland won by 46 runs
Dubai International Cricket Stadium, Dubai
Umpires: Chris Brown (NZ) and Allahudien Paleker (SA)
Player of the match: Calum MacLeod (Sco)

- Bermuda won the toss and elected to field.
- Calum MacLeod (Sco) scored his 1,000th run in T20Is.

25 October 2019
10:00
Scorecard

Papua New Guinea; 180/4 (20 overs)	v	Singapore; 137/9 (20 overs)
Kiplin Doriga 43* (27); Navin Param 2/24 (4 overs)		Tim David 44 (26); Damien Ravu 4/18 (4 overs)

Papua New Guinea won by 43 runs
Dubai International Cricket Stadium, Dubai
Umpires: Sam Nogajski (Aus) and Allahudien Paleker (SA)
Player of the match: Damien Ravu (PNG)

- Singapore won the toss and elected to field.
- Avi Dixit (Sin) made his T20I debut.

25 October 2019
14:10
Scorecard

Namibia; 181/5 (20 overs)	v	Kenya; 94 (18.5 overs)
Gerhard Erasmus 52* (25); Sachin Bhudia 1/6 (1 over)		Rakep Patel 30 (28); Bernard Scholtz 4/12 (4 overs)

Namibia won by 87 runs
Dubai International Cricket Stadium, Dubai
Umpires: Lyndon Hannibal (SL) and Alex Wharf (Eng)
Player of the match: Gerhard Erasmus (Nam)

- Namibia won the toss and elected to bat.

26 October 2019
14:10
Scorecard

Netherlands; 206/3 (20 overs)	v	Bermuda; 114/9 (20 overs)
Ben Cooper 58 (38); Rodney Trott 1/31 (4 overs)		Kamau Leverock 31 (15); Paul van Meekeren 3/26 (4 overs)

Netherlands won by 92 runs
Dubai International Cricket Stadium, Dubai
Umpires: Sundaram Ravi (Ind) and Rashid Riaz (Pak)
Player of the match: Colin Ackermann (Ned)

- Netherlands won the toss and elected to bat.

26 October 2019
19:30 (D/N)
Scorecard

Namibia; 191/8 (20 overs)	v	Singapore; 104 (17.1 overs)
Gerhard Erasmus 72 (46); Amjad Mahboob 3/29 (3 overs)		Navin Param 28 (27); Jan Frylinck 4/21 (3 overs)

Namibia won by 87 runs
Dubai International Cricket Stadium, Dubai
Umpires: Lyndon Hannibal (SL) and Sam Nogajski (Aus)
Player of the match: Gerhard Erasmus (Nam)

- Singapore won the toss and elected to field.

27 October 2019
10:00
Scorecard

Papua New Guinea; 118 (19.3 overs)	v	Kenya; 73 (18.4 overs)
Norman Vanua 54 (48); Emmanuel Bundi 4/18 (4 overs)		Irfan Karim 29 (22); Assad Vala 3/7 (4 overs)

Papua New Guinea won by 45 runs
Dubai International Cricket Stadium, Dubai
Umpires: Sundaram Ravi (Ind) and Alex Wharf (Eng)
Player of the match: Norman Vanua (PNG)

- Kenya won the toss and elected to field.
- Emmanuel Bundi (Ken) made his T20I debut.

27 October 2019
14:10
Scorecard

Scotland; 130/8 (20 overs)	v	Netherlands; 131/6 (17 overs)
Matthew Cross 52 (44); Pieter Seelaar 2/12 (3 overs)		Ryan ten Doeschate 51* (35); Mark Watt 3/18 (4 overs)

Netherlands won by 4 wickets
Dubai International Cricket Stadium, Dubai
Umpires: Allahudien Paleker (SA) and Rashid Riaz (Pak)
Player of the match: Pieter Seelaar (Ned)

- Netherlands won the toss and elected to field.
- Pieter Seelaar (Ned) took his 50th wicket in T20Is.

=== Group B ===
Pos	Team	Pld	W	L	T	NR	Pts	NRR
1	Ireland	6	4	2	0	0	8	1.591
2	Oman	6	4	2	0	0	8	0.997
3	United Arab Emirates	6	4	2	0	0	8	0.682
4	Hong Kong	6	3	3	0	0	6	0.480
5	Canada	6	3	3	0	0	6	0.240
6	Jersey	6	3	3	0	0	6	0.089
7	Nigeria	6	0	6	0	0	0	−4.673

Source: ESPNCricinfo

Advanced to Semifinal and 2021 Men's T20 World Cup.
Advanced to Semi-final Play-offs.
Advanced to 5th place Play-off Semi-Finals.

18 October 2019
14:10
Scorecard

Hong Kong; 153/5 (20 overs)	v	Ireland; 155/2 (17.2 overs)
Kinchit Shah 79 (54); Mark Adair 2/22 (4 overs)		Andrew Balbirnie 70* (53); Aizaz Khan 1/31 (4 overs)

Ireland won by 8 wickets
Sheikh Zayed Cricket Stadium, Abu Dhabi
Umpires: Sam Nogajski (Aus) and Sundaram Ravi (Ind)
Player of the match: Paul Stirling (Ire)

- Hong Kong won the toss and elected to bat.
- Simandeep Singh (HK) made his T20I debut.

18 October 2019
19:30 (D/N)
Scorecard

United Arab Emirates; 108/9 (20 overs)	v	Oman; 109/3 (18.2 overs)
Muhammad Usman 27 (24); Fayyaz Butt 3/16 (3 overs)		Aqib Ilyas 45* (51); Ahmed Raza 1/23 (4 overs)

Oman won by 7 wickets
Sheikh Zayed Cricket Stadium, Abu Dhabi
Umpires: Allahudien Paleker (SA) and Alex Wharf (Eng)
Player of the match: Fayyaz Butt (Oma)

- Oman won the toss and elected to field.
- Junaid Siddique (UAE) made his T20I debut.

19 October 2019
14:10
Scorecard

Jersey; 184/4 (20 overs)	v	Nigeria; 115/7 (20 overs)
Jonty Jenner 57* (42); Daniel Ajekun 1/16 (3 overs)		Leke Oyede 39 (44); Elliot Miles 2/22 (4 overs)

Jersey won by 69 runs
Sheikh Zayed Cricket Stadium, Abu Dhabi
Umpires: Lyndon Hannibal (SL) and Alex Wharf (Eng)
Player of the match: Jonty Jenner (Jer)

- Jersey won the toss and elected to bat.
- Sesan Adedeji, Daniel Ajekun, Daniel Gim and Sulaimon Runsewe (Nga) all made their T20I debuts.

19 October 2019
19:30 (D/N)
Scorecard

Ireland; 125 (20 overs)	v	United Arab Emirates; 129/5 (17 overs)
Paul Stirling 72 (58); Rohan Mustafa 4/18 (4 overs)		Rohan Mustafa 39 (16); Mark Adair 1/21 (4 overs)

United Arab Emirates won by 5 wickets
Sheikh Zayed Cricket Stadium, Abu Dhabi
Umpires: Sam Nogajski (Aus) and Rashid Riaz (Pak)
Player of the match: Rohan Mustafa (UAE)

- United Arab Emirates won the toss and elected to field.

20 October 2019
10:00
Scorecard

Canada; 176/5 (20 overs)	v	Jersey; 123 (17 overs)
Nitish Kumar 83 (36); Charles Perchard 2/21 (4 overs)		Jonty Jenner 56 (32); Jeremy Gordon 3/14 (3 overs)

Canada won by 53 runs
Tolerance Oval, Abu Dhabi
Umpires: Lyndon Hannibal (SL) and Rashid Riaz (Pak)
Player of the match: Nitish Kumar (Can)

- Jersey won the toss and elected to field.
- Nicholas Kirton (Can) made his T20I debut.

20 October 2019
14:10
Scorecard

Hong Kong; 102 (20 overs)	v	Oman; 106/3 (17.3 overs)
Nizakat Khan 31 (33); Aamir Kaleem 3/14 (4 overs)		Aqib Ilyas 37* (33); Kinchit Shah 1/18 (4 overs)

Oman won by 7 wickets
Sheikh Zayed Cricket Stadium, Abu Dhabi
Umpires: Allahudien Paleker (SA) and Sundaram Ravi (Ind)
Player of the match: Aamir Kaleem (Oma)

- Oman won the toss and elected to field.

21 October 2019
14:10
Scorecard

Hong Kong; 116/7 (20 overs)	v	United Arab Emirates; 118/2 (15.1 overs)
Nizakat Khan 31 (29); Rohan Mustafa 2/17 (4 overs)		Rameez Shahzad 54 (37); Kyle Christie 2/24 (3 overs)

United Arab Emirates won by 8 wickets
Sheikh Zayed Cricket Stadium, Abu Dhabi
Umpires: Sundaram Ravi (Ind) and Alex Wharf (Eng)
Player of the match: Rameez Shahzad (UAE)

- Hong Kong won the toss and elected to bat.

21 October 2019
14:10
Scorecard

Ireland; 183/3 (20 overs)	v	Oman; 148/9 (20 overs)
Gareth Delany 89* (49); Khawar Ali 1/28 (4 overs)		Khawar Ali 50 (34); George Dockrell 2/24 (3 overs)

Ireland won by 35 runs
Tolerance Oval, Abu Dhabi
Umpires: Sam Nogajski (Aus) and Allahudien Paleker (SA)
Player of the match: Gareth Delany (Ire)

- Oman won the toss and elected to field.

21 October 2019
19:30 (D/N)
Scorecard

Canada; 159/7 (20 overs)	v	Nigeria; 109/8 (20 overs)
Nitish Kumar 57* (36); Abiodun Abioye 2/26 (3 overs)		Chimezie Onwuzulike 39 (31); Dillon Heyliger 3/16 (4 overs)

Canada won by 50 runs
Sheikh Zayed Cricket Stadium, Abu Dhabi
Umpires: Lyndon Hannibal (SL) and Rashid Riaz (Pak)
Player of the match: Nitish Kumar (Can)

- Canada won the toss and elected to bat.

22 October 2019
14:10
Scorecard

Jersey; 147 (20 overs)	v	United Arab Emirates; 112 (19.2 overs)
Benjamin Ward 47 (24); Junaid Siddique 2/34 (4 overs)		Rohan Mustafa 28 (30); Harrison Carlyon 3/15 (4 overs)

Jersey won by 35 runs
Tolerance Oval, Abu Dhabi
Umpires: Ahmed Shah Pakteen (Afg) and Sharfuddoula (Ban)
Player of the match: Benjamin Ward (Jer)

- Jersey won the toss and elected to bat.

23 October 2019
10:00
Scorecard

Nigeria; 71 (19.5 overs)	v	Oman; 72/3 (7 overs)
Daniel Ajekun 16 (21); Aamir Kaleem 4/14 (4 overs)		Jatinder Singh 48 (22); Sylvester Okpe 1/4 (1 over); Sulaimon Runsewe 1/4 (1 over)

Oman won by 7 wickets
Tolerance Oval, Abu Dhabi
Umpires: Rashid Riaz (Pak) and Sharfuddoula (Ban)
Player of the match: Aamir Kaleem (Oma)

- Nigeria won the toss and elected to bat.

23 October 2019
14:10
Scorecard

Canada; 156/5 (20 overs)	v	Ireland; 146/7 (20 overs)
Navneet Dhaliwal 69 (51); Boyd Rankin 2/32 (4 overs)		Stuart Thompson 28* (25); Saad Bin Zafar 2/31 (4 overs)

Canada won by 10 runs
Sheikh Zayed Cricket Stadium, Abu Dhabi
Umpires: Lyndon Hannibal (SL) and Ahmed Shah Pakteen (Afg)
Player of the match: Nitish Kumar (Can)

- Canada won the toss and elected to bat.

23 October 2019
19:30 (D/N)
Scorecard

Hong Kong; 144/7 (20 overs)	v	Jersey; 136/6 (20 overs)
Nizakat Khan 48 (30); Benjamin Ward 3/19 (4 overs)		Ben Stevens 39 (37); Ehsan Khan 2/18 (4 overs)

Hong Kong won by 8 runs
Sheikh Zayed Cricket Stadium, Abu Dhabi
Umpires: Sundaram Ravi (Ind) and Raveendra Wimalasiri (SL)
Player of the match: Scott McKechnie (HK)

- Hong Kong won the toss and elected to bat.

24 October 2019
10:00
Scorecard

Nigeria; 111/3 (20 overs)	v	United Arab Emirates; 112/5 (12.3 overs)
Sesan Adedeji 51* (48); Junaid Siddique 1/15 (4 overs); Ahmed Raza 1/15 (4 overs)		Zawar Farid 55 (35); Sylvester Okpe 2/22 (3 overs)

United Arab Emirates won by 5 wickets
Tolerance Oval, Abu Dhabi
Umpires: Lyndon Hannibal (SL) and Sundaram Ravi (Ind)
Player of the match: Zawar Farid (UAE)

- United Arab Emirates won the toss and elected to field.

24 October 2019
14:10
Scorecard

Hong Kong; 150/7 (20 overs)	v	Canada; 118/9 (20 overs)
Kinchit Shah 59* (48); Nitish Kumar 1/18 (4 overs)		Rizwan Cheema 20 (19); Nasrulla Rana 3/25 (4 overs)

Hong Kong won by 32 runs
Tolerance Oval, Abu Dhabi
Umpires: Rashid Riaz (Pak) and Raveendra Wimalasiri (SL)
Player of the match: Kinchit Shah (HK)

- Hong Kong won the toss and elected to bat.

25 October 2019
10:00
Scorecard

Jersey; 105 (20 overs)	v	Ireland; 110/2 (14 overs)
Ben Stevens 25 (25); Mark Adair 3/10 (4 overs)		Paul Stirling 58* (37); Charles Perchard 1/16 (3 overs)

Ireland won by 8 wickets
Tolerance Oval, Abu Dhabi
Umpires: Chris Brown (NZ) and Ahsan Raza (Pak)
Player of the match: Mark Adair (Ire)

- Ireland won the toss and elected to field.

25 October 2019
19:30 (D/N)
Scorecard

Canada; 144/9 (20 overs)	v	Oman; 145/2 (14.5 overs)
Srimantha Wijeratne 56 (36); Zeeshan Maqsood 3/25 (4 overs)		Jatinder Singh 68* (39); Jeremy Gordon 1/36 (3.5 overs)

Oman won by 8 wickets
Sheikh Zayed Cricket Stadium, Abu Dhabi
Umpires: Roland Black (Ire) and Sharfuddoula (Ban)
Player of the match: Jatinder Singh (Oma)

- Canada won the toss and elected to bat.
- Srimantha Wijeratne (Can) made his T20I debut.

26 October 2019
10:00
Scorecard

Nigeria; 66/9 (20 overs)	v	Ireland; 67/2 (6.1 overs)
Sesan Adedeji 19* (32); Craig Young 4/13 (4 overs)		Kevin O'Brien 32 (17); Daniel Ajekun 1/10 (1 over)

Ireland won by 8 wickets
Sheikh Zayed Cricket Stadium, Abu Dhabi
Umpires: Chris Brown (NZ) and Ahmed Shah Pakteen (Afg)
Player of the match: Craig Young (Ire)

- Nigeria won the toss and elected to bat.

27 October 2019
10:00
Scorecard

Nigeria; 81/8 (20 overs)	v	Hong Kong; 82/5 (7.1 overs)
Ademola Onikoyi 18 (35); Aizaz Khan 2/5 (2 overs)		Kinchit Shah 25 (10); Daniel Ajekun 1/5 (1.1 overs)

Hong Kong won by 5 wickets
Tolerance Oval, Abu Dhabi
Umpires: Sharfuddoula (Ban) and Raveendra Wimalasiri (SL)
Player of the match: Mohammad Ghazanfar (HK)

- Nigeria won the toss and elected to bat.
- Gershon Yusuf (Nga) made his T20I debut.

27 October 2019
14:10
Scorecard

Jersey; 141/7 (20 overs)	v	Oman; 127/9 (20 overs)
Nicholas Ferraby 41 (33); Mohammad Nadeem 4/23 (4 overs)		Zeeshan Maqsood 56 (47); Elliot Miles 3/22 (4 overs)

Jersey won by 14 runs
Sheikh Zayed Cricket Stadium, Abu Dhabi
Umpires: Roland Black (Ire) and Chris Brown (NZ)

- Oman won the toss and elected to field.

27 October 2019
19:30 (D/N)
Scorecard

United Arab Emirates; 154/5 (20 overs)	v	Canada; 140/5 (20 overs)
Muhammad Usman 89* (63); Saad Bin Zafar 3/21 (4 overs)		Navneet Dhaliwal 41 (36); Waheed Ahmed 3/21 (4 overs)

United Arab Emirates won by 14 runs
Sheikh Zayed Cricket Stadium, Abu Dhabi
Umpires: Ahmed Shah Pakteen (Afg) and Ahsan Raza (Pak)
Player of the match: Muhammad Usman (UAE)

- Canada won the toss and elected to field.

== Playoffs ==
=== Bracket ===
Semi-final play-off
A2	Netherlands	81/2
B3	United Arab Emirates	80/9
A3	Namibia	161/7
B2	Oman	107

Semi-finals †
B1	Ireland	137/9
A2	Netherlands	158/4
A1	Papua New Guinea	130/5
A3	Namibia	112/5

Final
A2	Netherlands	134/3
A1	Papua New Guinea	128/8
3rd place play-off
B1	Ireland	135
A3	Namibia	108

5th place play-off semi-finals
A4	Scotland	198/6
B3	United Arab Emirates *	108
B4	Hong Kong	122/9
B2	Oman *	134/7

5th place play-off †
A4	Scotland	168/5
B2	Oman	167/7

- * Team entered by losing in the Semi-final play-off.
- ^{†} Teams qualified for the 2021 ICC Men's T20 World Cup upon reaching this stage.

=== Qualifier 1 ===
29 October 2019
14:10
Scorecard

United Arab Emirates; 80/9 (20 overs)	v	Netherlands; 81/2 (15.1 overs)
Ahmed Raza 22 (24); Brandon Glover 4/12 (4 overs)		Ben Cooper 41* (53); Zahoor Khan 1/12 (2 overs)

Netherlands won by 8 wickets
Dubai International Cricket Stadium, Dubai
Umpires: Roland Black (Ire) and Lyndon Hannibal (SL)
Player of the match: Brandon Glover (Ned)

- United Arab Emirates won the toss and elected to bat.

=== Qualifier 2 ===
29 October 2019
19:30 (D/N)
Scorecard

Namibia; 161/7 (20 overs)	v	Oman; 107 (19.1 overs)
JJ Smit 59 (25); Bilal Khan 4/19 (4 overs)		Khawar Ali 41 (25); Bernard Scholtz 3/14 (4 overs)

Namibia won by 54 runs
Dubai International Cricket Stadium, Dubai
Umpires: Chris Brown (NZ) and Sundaram Ravi (Ind)
Player of the match: JJ Smit (Nam)

- Namibia won the toss and elected to bat.

=== Qualifier 3 ===
30 October 2019
14:10
Scorecard

Scotland; 198/6 (20 overs)	v	United Arab Emirates; 108 (18.3 overs)
George Munsey 65 (43); Rohan Mustafa 2/38 (4 overs)		Rameez Shahzad 34 (28); Safyaan Sharif 3/21 (3.3 overs)

Scotland won by 90 runs
Dubai International Cricket Stadium, Dubai
Umpires: Ahsan Raza (Pak) and Alex Wharf (Eng)
Player of the match: George Munsey (Sco)

- Scotland won the toss and elected to bat.

=== Qualifier 4 ===
30 October 2019
19:30 (D/N)
Scorecard

Oman; 134/7 (20 overs)	v	Hong Kong; 122/9 (20 overs)
Jatinder Singh 67 (50); Nasrulla Rana 2/26 (3 overs)		Scott McKechnie 44 (46); Bilal Khan 4/23 (4 overs)

Oman won by 12 runs
Dubai International Cricket Stadium, Dubai
Umpires: Sam Nogajski (Aus) and Allahudien Paleker (SA)
Player of the match: Jatinder Singh (Oma)

- Oman won the toss and elected to bat.

=== 5th Place Playoff ===
31 October 2019
14:10
Scorecard

Oman; 167/7 (20 overs)	v	Scotland; 168/5 (19 overs)
Khawar Ali 43 (29); Alasdair Evans 3/36 (4 overs)		Matthew Cross 61* (45); Bilal Khan 2/38 (4 overs)

Scotland won by 5 wickets
ICC Academy Ground, Dubai
Umpires: Rashid Riaz (Pak) and Raveendra Wimalasiri (SL)
Player of the match: Matthew Cross (Sco)

- Oman won the toss and elected to bat.

=== Semifinal 1 ===
1 November 2019
14:10
Scorecard

Netherlands; 158/4 (20 overs)	v	Ireland; 137/9 (20 overs)
Ryan ten Doeschate 43* (25); Craig Young 2/39 (4 overs)		Paul Stirling 29 (24); Pieter Seelaar 3/17 (4 overs)

Netherlands won by 21 runs
Dubai International Cricket Stadium, Dubai
Umpires: Sharfuddoula (Ban) and Alex Wharf (Eng)
Player of the match: Roelof van der Merwe (Ned)

- Ireland won the toss and elected to field.

=== Semifinal 2 ===
1 November 2019
19:30 (D/N)
Scorecard

Papua New Guinea; 130/5 (20 overs)	v	Namibia; 112/5 (20 overs)
Sese Bau 40* (37); JJ Smit 2/29 (4 overs)		Stephan Baard 34 (40); Norman Vanua 2/16 (4 overs)

Papua New Guinea won by 18 runs
Dubai International Cricket Stadium, Dubai
Umpires: Sam Nogajski (Aus) and Allahudien Paleker (SA)
Player of the match: Norman Vanua (PNG)

- Papua New Guinea won the toss and elected to bat.

=== 3rd Place Playoff ===
2 November 2019
14:10
Scorecard

Ireland; 135 (19.1 overs)	v	Namibia; 108 (18.1 overs)
Andrew Balbirnie 46 (35); JJ Smit 3/19 (3.1 overs)		Gerhard Erasmus 51 (34); Simi Singh 3/25 (4 overs)

Ireland won by 27 runs
Dubai International Cricket Stadium, Dubai
Umpires: Allahudien Paleker (SA) and Alex Wharf (Eng)
Player of the match: Simi Singh (Ire)

- Ireland won the toss and elected to bat.

=== Final ===
2 November 2019
19:30 (D/N)
Scorecard

Papua New Guinea; 128/8 (20 overs)	v	Netherlands; 134/3 (19 overs)
Lega Siaka 39 (41); Brandon Glover 3/24 (4 overs)		Ben Cooper 41 (33); Assad Vala 1/15 (4 overs)

Netherlands won by 7 wickets
Dubai International Cricket Stadium, Dubai
Umpires: Sam Nogajski (Aus) and Ahsan Raza (Pak)
Player of the match: Brandon Glover (Ned)

- Papua New Guinea won the toss and elected to bat.

== Final standings ==
These were the final standings following the conclusion of the tournament. The top six places were used for seeding purposes for the 2020 Men's T20 World Cup.

Position	Team
1st	Netherlands
2nd	Papua New Guinea
3rd	Ireland
4th	Namibia
5th	Scotland
6th	Oman
7th	United Arab Emirates
8th	Hong Kong
9th	Canada
10th	Jersey
11th	Kenya
12th	Singapore
13th	Bermuda
14th	Nigeria

1st to 6th Qualified for the 2021 ICC Men's T20 World Cup.
