= Mohammad Ghazanfar =

Hong Kong cricketer (born 1994)

Personal information
- Born: 28 December 1994 (age 31); Mirpur, Azad Kashmir, Pakistan
- Role: Bowler

International information
- National side: Hong Kong
- T20I debut (cap 30): 6 October 2019 v Nepal
- Last T20I: 31 October 2023 v Bahrain

Career statistics
Competition	T20I	List A
Matches	15	12
Runs scored	15	18
Batting average	5.00	6.00
100s/50s	0/0	0/0
Top score	6*	6*
Balls bowled	300	395
Wickets	14	10
Bowling average	22.92	33.50
5 wickets in innings	0	0
10 wickets in match	0	0
Best bowling	3/22	4/30
Catches/stumpings	2/-	0/-
- Source: Cricinfo, 31 October 2022

Mohammad Ghazanfar (born 28 December 1994) is a Pakistani-born Hong Kong cricketer. In April 2019, he was named in Hong Kong's squad for the 2019 ICC World Cricket League Division Two tournament in Namibia. He made his List A debut for Hong Kong against the United States in the 2019 ICC World Cricket League Division Two tournament on 24 April 2019.

Prior to his List A debut, he was selected for the Hong Kong under-19 team in 2011, and in May 2013, he took eight wickets for fourteen runs in an ACC Under-19 Cup match against Thailand.

In September 2019, he was named in Hong Kong's Twenty20 International (T20I) squad for the 2019–20 Oman Pentangular Series, and the 2019 ICC T20 World Cup Qualifier tournament in the United Arab Emirates. He made his T20I debut for Hong Kong, against Nepal, on 6 October 2019.

In May 2022, he was named in Hong Kong's side for the 2022 Uganda Cricket World Cup Challenge League B tournament.
