= Waqas Barkat =

Hong Kong cricketer

Personal information
- Full name: Waqas Barkat
- Born: 17 February 1990 (age 36); Rawalpindi, Punjab, Pakistan
- Batting: Right-handed
- Bowling: Right-arm leg break
- Role: Batsman, Wicket-keeper

International information
- National side: Hong Kong (2008–present)
- ODI debut (cap 27): 1 May 2014 v Afghanistan
- Last ODI: 10 March 2018 v Zimbabwe
- T20I debut (cap 11): 16 March 2014 v Nepal
- Last T20I: 6 March 2020 v Malaysia

Career statistics
Competition	ODI	T20I	FC	LA
Matches	10	30	2	28
Runs scored	102	307	30	410
Batting average	12.75	13.95	10.00	17.82
100s/50s	0/0	0/0	0/0	0/2
Top score	27	37	23*	66
Balls bowled	90	200	24	336
Wickets	0	6	0	8
Bowling average	–	43.33	–	34.37
5 wickets in innings	0	0	0	0
10 wickets in match	–	–	–	0
Best bowling	–	2/13	–	3/39
Catches/stumpings	3/–	8/–	0/–	16/3
- Source: CricketArchive, 31 January 2023

Waqas Barkat (born 17 February 1990) is a Pakistani-born Hong Kong cricketer. Barkat is a right-handed batsman and wicket-keeper. He was born in Rawalpindi, Punjab.

Having played age group cricket for Hong Kong Under-19s in the 2010 Under-19 World Cup, he proceeded to make his World Cricket League debut for Hong Kong in the 2011 World Cricket League Division Three, where he helped Hong Kong earn promotion to 2011 World Cricket League Division Two. It was in this tournament that he made his List A debut against Uganda on 8 April 2011. He played 5 further List A matches in the competition, the last coming against Papua New Guinea. In his 6 matches, he scored 49 runs at a batting average of 8.16, with a high score of 25. Behind the stumps he took 9 catches and made 3 stumpings.

He made his One Day International debut against Afghanistan in the 2014 ACC Premier League on 1 May 2014.

In September 2019, he was named in Hong Kong's squad for the 2019 ICC T20 World Cup Qualifier tournament in the United Arab Emirates. In November 2019, he was named in Hong Kong's squad for the Cricket World Cup Challenge League B tournament in Oman.
