= Raag Kapur =

Hong Kong cricketer (born 1999)

Personal information
- Born: 22 February 1999 (age 27)
- Batting: Right-handed
- Bowling: Right arm medium-fast
- Role: Bowler
- Relatives: Raunaq Kapur (brother)

International information
- National side: Hong Kong
- T20I debut (cap 31): 6 October 2019 v Nepal
- Last T20I: 25 October 2023 v United Arab Emirates
- Source: Cricinfo, 11 March 2023

Raag Kapur (born 22 February 1999) is a Hong Kong cricketer. In September 2019, he was named in Hong Kong's Twenty20 International (T20I) squads for the 2019–20 Oman Pentangular Series and the 2019 ICC T20 World Cup Qualifier tournament in the United Arab Emirates. He made his T20I debut for Hong Kong, against Nepal, on 6 October 2019.
