= Adit Gorawara =

Hong Kong cricketer (born 2001)

Personal information
- Born: 21 December 2001 (age 24); Delhi, India
- Batting: Right-handed
- Role: Batsman

International information
- National side: Hong Kong
- T20I debut (cap 41): 9 March 2023 v Kuwait
- Last T20I: 19 October 2023 v Nepal
- Source: Cricinfo, 25 November 2019

Adit Gorawara (born 21 December 2001) is an Indian-born Hong Kong cricketer. In November 2019, he was named in Hong Kong's squad for the ICC World Cup Challenge League B tournament in Oman. He captained the Hong Kong under-19 team at the Asian Cricket Council's Eastern Region tournament in July 2019 and was declared the Best Batsman of the tournament. Gorawara scored 220 runs at an average of 55, including three back-to-back fifties. He made his List A debut, for Hong Kong against Jersey, on 5 December 2019.

In May 2022, he was named in Hong Kong's side for the 2022 Uganda Cricket World Cup Challenge League B tournament. He was also named in Hong Kong's side for the 2022 ICC Men's T20 World Cup Global Qualifier B tournament. He was ruled out of the 2022 Jersey Cricket World Cup Challenge League B and 2022 Asia Cup due to injury.
