= List of Hong Kong Twenty20 International cricketers =

A Twenty20 International (T20I) is an international cricket match between two representative teams, each having T20I status, as determined by the International Cricket Council (ICC), and is played under the rules of Twenty20 cricket.

Hong Kong's first T20I was the second match of group A in the 2014 ICC World Twenty20 against Nepal, which they lost by 80 runs. Hong Kong's final match at the 2014 ICC World Twenty20 was the team's first T20I victory. The game was against Bangladesh and Hong Kong won by two wickets.

This list comprises all members of the Hong Kong cricket team who have played at least one T20I match. It is initially arranged in the order in which each player won his first Twenty20 cap. Where more than one player won his first Twenty20 cap in the same match, those players are listed alphabetically by surname.

== Key ==
General

- ‡ – Captain
- † – Wicket-keeper
- First – Year of debut
- Last – Year of latest game
- Mat – Number of matches played

Batting

- Runs – Runs scored in career
- HS – Highest score
- Avg – Runs scored per dismissal
- * – Batsman remained not out
- 100 – Centuries scored
- 50 – Half-centuries scored

Bowling

- Balls – Balls bowled in career
- Wkt – Wickets taken in career
- BBI – Best bowling in an innings
- Ave – Average runs per wicket

Fielding

- Ca – Catches taken
- St – Stumpings taken

== Players ==
Statistics are correct as of 14 October 2026.

Hong Kong T20I cricketers
General					Batting					Bowling				Fielding		Ref
No.	Name	First	Last	Mat	Runs	HS	Avg	50	100	Balls	Wkt	BBI	Ave	Ca	St	Ref
1	Aizaz Khan ‡	2014	2026	108	1,115	48*	15.27	0	0	1,757	106	4/26	21.94	30	0	
2	Jamie Atkinson ‡†	2014	2024	29	448	68*	19.47	3	0	–	–	–	–	24	1	n
3	Babar Hayat	2014	2026	120	2,756	122	28.12	15	2	6	0	–	–	61	0	
4	Mark Chapman^{1}	2014	2016	19	392	63*	23.05	1	0	60	3	1/10	25.66	4	0	
5	Haseeb Amjad	2014	2016	18	45	12*	11.25	0	0	368	24	4/16	18.87	2	0	
6	Irfan Ahmed	2014	2015	8	76	34	9.50	0	0	162	11	3/11	17.27	2	0	
7	Nadeem Ahmed	2014	2017	24	34	10	6.80	0	0	495	25	4/21	21.84	12	0	
8	Najeeb Amar	2014	2014	1	2	2	2.00	0	0	18	1	1/29	29.00	0	0	
9	Nizakat Khan ‡	2014	2026	131	2,573	81	21.62	13	0	215	11	3/19	20.36	66	0	
10	Tanwir Afzal ‡	2014	2016	21	219	56	13.68	1	0	426	19	2/8	26.78	4	0	
11	Waqas Barkat	2014	2025	39	313	37	13.04	0	0	296	12	4/18	33.08	13	0	
12	Munir Dar	2014	2014	2	39	36	19.50	0	0	–	–	–	–	1	0	
13	Ehsan Nawaz	2014	2024	6	9	9*	9.00	0	0	64	4	2/24	25.75	2	0	
14	Anas Khan	2014	2026	29	71	21*	8.87	0	0	465	37	4/30	13.02	5	0	
15	Kinchit Shah ‡	2014	2025	54	733	79	17.87	3	0	468	17	3/18	34.29	16	0	
16	Waqas Khan	2014	2020	16	164	60	16.40	1	0	6	0	–	–	1	0	
17	Anshuman Rath	2015	2026	93	2,580	140*	31.85	13	2	256	7	3/6	48.42	30	0	
18	Christopher Carter †	2015	2017	10	55	17	13.75	0	0	–	–	–	–	2	1	
19	Adil Mehmood	2016	2024	7	14	14*	–	0	0	66	1	1/35	116.00	1	0	
20	Tanveer Ahmed	2016	2017	5	7	7*	7.00	0	0	81	3	2/29	38.66	1	0	
21	Ryan Campbell^{2}	2016	2016	3	36	27	12.00	0	0	60	3	2/28	34.00	1	0	
22	Ehsan Khan	2016	2026	119	460	42*	13.93	0	0	2,489	165	4/5	15.38	25	0	
23	Shahid Wasif	2016	2026	47	679	59*	26.11	4	0	–	–	–	–	18	0	
24	Ahsan Abbasi	2019	2019	6	80	18	13.33	0	0	–	–	–	–	0	0	
25	Aarush Bhagwat †	2019	2019	4	5	3	1.25	0	0	–	–	–	–	2	0	
26	Kyle Christie	2019	2019	11	15	11*	7.50	0	0	234	10	2/23	29.20	4	0	
27	Haroon Arshad	2019	2024	36	355	68	20.88	1	0	507	30	5/16	23.96	5	0	
28	Scott McKechnie †	2019	2023	30	275	44	17.18	0	0	–	–	–	–	14	9	
29	Nasrulla Rana	2019	2026	71	302	36*	11.61	0	0	986	62	6/12	21.08	18	0	
30	Mohammad Ghazanfar	2019	2026	45	44	7*	5.50	0	0	792	45	3/6	19.55	8	0	
31	Raag Kapur	2019	2023	7	12	6	6.00	0	0	72	3	1/23	30.00	2	0	
32	Simandeep Singh	2019	2019	7	33	14*	6.60	0	0	–	–	–	–	4	0	
33	Aftab Hussain	2020	2022	10	7	5*	–	0	0	228	16	3/14	15.50	1	0	
34	Hamed Khan	2020	2023	5	30	10	7.50	0	0	–	–	–	–	1	0	
35	Mohsin Khan	2020	2020	3	–	–	–	–	–	54	4	3/37	18.00	0	0	
36	Hassan Khan Mohammad	2020	2026	15	62	25	12.40	0	0	210	12	2/14	26.08	4	0	
37	Ayush Shukla	2022	2026	68	36	10	3.27	0	0	1,219	67	4/49	23.71	10	0	
38	Yasim Murtaza ‡	2022	2026	87	957	60	16.22	3	0	1,707	89	4/9	19.85	21	0	
39	Zeeshan Ali †	2022	2026	77	1,542	101	27.53	8	1	0	0	–	–	28	16	
40	Ateeq Iqbal	2022	2026	43	20	5*	6.66	0	0	740	38	3/8	20.26	13	0	
41	Adit Gorawara †	2023	2024	4	38	20	9.50	0	0	–	–	–	–	3	0	
42	Akbar Khan	2023	2023	7	27	7	4.50	0	0	–	–	–	–	3	0	
43	Shiv Mathur †	2023	2026	24	279	39	15.50	0	0	–	–	–	–	10	1	
44	Mohammad Waheed	2023	2026	5	14	7	14.00	0	0	89	4	3/23	38.25	5	0	
45	Muhammad Khan	2023	2023	6	35	18	5.83	0	0	–	–	–	–	2	0	
46	Niaz Ali	2023	2023	5	13	12	4.33	0	0	76	2	1/25	50.50	0	0	
47	Martin Coetzee	2023	2024	31	528	102	18.85	3	1	–	–	–	–	10	0	
48	Dhananjay Rao	2024	2024	8	5	5	1.66	0	0	132	7	4/13	22.14	4	0	
49	Jason Lui	2024	2024	1	12	12*	0.00	0	0	–	–	–	–	1	0	
50	Raunaq Kapur	2024	2024	1	3	3	3.00	0	0	12	1	1/24	24.00	0	0	
51	Rajab Hussain	2024	2024	2	3	2	3.00	0	0	–	–	–	–	1	0	
52	Kalhan Challu	2025	2025	9	151	45	25.16	0	0	–	–	–	–	1	0	
53	Darsh Vora	2025	2025	1	–	–	–	–	–	12	0	–	–	1	0	
54	Paras Singh	2025	2025	3	–	–	–	–	–	44	2	1/27	33.50	1	0	
55	Asad Rasheed	2026	2026	3	1	1*	–	0	0	72	5	3/37	25.40	0	0	
56	Hafeez Khan	2026	2026	2	33	33	33.00	0	0	–	–	–	–	1	0	
57	Reyansh Sharma	2026	2026	5	120	71*	60.00	1	0	6	1	1/5	5.00	2	0	

Notes:

- ^{1} Mark Chapman also played T20I cricket for New Zealand. Only his record for Hong Kong is given above.
- ^{2} Ryan Campbell has also played T20 cricket for Australia. Only his record for Hong Kong is given above.

== See also ==
- Twenty20 International
- Hong Kong national cricket team
- List of Hong Kong ODI cricketers
