= Kinchit Shah =

Hong Kong cricketer (born 1995)

Personal information
- Full name: Kinchit Devang Shah
- Born: 9 December 1995 (age 30); Mumbai, Maharashtra, India
- Batting: Left-handed
- Bowling: Right-arm off break
- Role: Batsman
- Relatives: Ninad Shah (brother)

International information
- National side: Hong Kong (2014–2023)
- ODI debut (cap 30): 8 November 2014 v Papua New Guinea
- Last ODI: 18 September 2018 v India
- T20I debut (cap 15): 24 November 2014 v Nepal
- Last T20I: 13 November 2025 v Qatar

Career statistics
Competition	ODI	T20I	FC	LA
Matches	10	49	1	37
Runs scored	136	706	66	1,058
Batting average	13.28	19.08	33.00	32.06
100s/50s	0/0	0/3	0/1	3/5
Top score	34*	79	62	139
Balls bowled	56	396	–	884
Wickets	4	12	–	37
Bowling average	10.00	41.25	–	18.59
5 wickets in innings	0	0	–	0
10 wickets in match	0	0	–	0
Best bowling	4/10	2/9	–	4/10
Catches/stumpings	1/–	16/–	0/–	9/–
- Source: ESPNcricinfo, 31 July 2025

Kinchit Devang Shah (born 9 December 1995) is an Indian-born Hong Kong cricketer. He is a left-handed batsman, right-arm off break bowler and occasional wicket-keeper.

== Career ==
Shah made his T20 cricket debut against the Canada cricket team on 15 March 2012. He made his One Day International debut for Hong Kong on 8 November 2014 against Papua New Guinea in Australia. He made his Twenty20 International debut on 24 November 2014 against Nepal in Sri Lanka.

In August 2018, Shah was named in Hong Kong's squad for the 2018 Asia Cup Qualifier tournament. Hong Kong won the qualifier tournament, and he was then named in Hong Kong's squad for the 2018 Asia Cup.

Shah was a member of Hong Kong's squad for the 2019 ICC World Cricket League Division Two tournament in Namibia. In Hong Kong's opening match of the tournament, against Canada, Shah took a hat-trick. He was the leading wicket-taker for Hong Kong in the tournament, with eleven dismissals in six matches.

In September 2019, Shah was named in Hong Kong's squad for the 2019 ICC T20 World Cup Qualifier tournament in the United Arab Emirates. He was the leading run-scorer for Hong Kong in the tournament, with 223 runs in seven matches. In November 2019, he was named in Hong Kong's squad for the 2019 ACC Emerging Teams Asia Cup in Bangladesh. Later the same month, he was named in Hong Kong's squad for the Cricket World Cup Challenge League B tournament in Oman. In the third match of the tournament, against Bermuda, he scored his first century in List A cricket.

In May 2022, he was named in Hong Kong's side for the 2022 Uganda Cricket World Cup Challenge League B tournament.

On August 31, 2022, during 2022 Asia Cup vs. India, in which he was also a vice-captain, he proposed to his girlfriend.
