= List of Hong Kong first-class cricketers =

This is a list in alphabetical order of Hong Kong cricketers who have played first-class cricket. From 1841 to 1997, Hong Kong was a British colony, with many players who were born there going onto play county cricket in England. The Hong Kong cricket team first played first-class in the 2005 ICC Intercontinental Cup against the United Arab Emirates. Following a gap of ten years, Hong Kong returned to first-class in 2015 and have played a total of nine first-class matches, up until the discontinuation of the Intercontinental Cup in 2017. The last Hong Kong cricketer to play first-class cricket is Mark Chapman, who played for played in New Zealand for Auckland in March 2021.

The details are the player's usual name followed by the years in which he was active as a first-class player and then his name is given as it would appear on modern match scorecards. Note that many players represented other first-class teams besides Hong Kong. Players are shown to the end of the 2021–22 season.

As of 5 February 2022

== A ==
- Tanwir Afzal (2015–2016–17) : T. Afzal
- Irfan Ahmed (2005–2015) : I. Ahmed
- Nadeem Ahmed (2005–2017–18) : N. Ahmed
- Tanveer Ahmed (2016–2017–18) : T. Ahmed
- Skhawat Ali (2015) : S. Ali
- Haseeb Amjad (2015–2015–16) : H. Amjad
- Haroon Arshad (2017–18) : H. A. Mohammad
- Jamie Atkinson (2009–2015–16) : J. J. Atkinson

== B ==
- Waqas Barkat (2015–2017–18) : W. Barkat
- David Brettell (1975–78) : D. N. Brettell

== C ==
- Ryan Campbell (1995/96–2005–06) : R. J. Campbell
- Christopher Carter (2015/16–2017–18) : C. J. Carter
- Mark Chapman (2015/16–2020–21) : M. S. Chapman
- Manoj Cheruparambil (2005) : M. Cheruparambil
- Kyle Christie (2017–18) : C. M. Christie

== D ==
- Tabarak Dar (2005) : T. H. Dar

== E ==
- Mark Eames (2005) : M. I. N. Eames

== G ==
- Adam Gunthorpe (2005) : A. G. Gunthorpe
- Ilyas Gul (2005) : M. I. Gul

== H ==
- Afzaal Haider (1991/92–2005) : M. A. Haider
- Nasir Hameed (2005) : N. Hameed
- Babar Hayat (2015–2017–18) : B. Hayat

== I ==
- Jawaid Iqbal (2005) : J. Iqbal

== K ==
- Aizaz Khan (2015/16–2017–18) : M. A. Khan
- Ehsan Khan (2016–2017–18) : E. Khan
- Khalid Khan (2005) : K. Khan
- Nizakat Khan (2015–2017–8) : N. Khan
- Waqas Khan (2016–2017–18) : W. Khan

== L ==
- Roy Lamsam (2015) : J. P. R. Lamsam

== M ==
- Cameron McAuslan (2017–18) : C. L. McAuslan
- Simon Myles (1987–1994) : S. D. Myles

== N ==
- Ehsan Nawaz (2015–2017–18) : E. Nawaz

== O ==
- Jonathan Orders (1978–1981) : J. O. D. Orders

== P ==
- Robert Palmer (1981–1983) : R. W. M. Palmer
- Sean Parry (2006) : S. J. P. Parry
- Alec Pearce (1930–1946) : T. A. Pearce

== R ==
- Anshuman Rath (2015/16–2017–18) : A. Rath
- Dermot Reeve (1983–1996) : D. A. Reeve
- Charles Rowe (1974–1984) : C. J. C. Rowe

== S ==
- Alex Scott (2010–2012) : A. J. D. Scott
- Kinchit Shah (2015–16) : K. D. Shah
- Ninad Shah (2016) : N. D. Shah
- Rahul Sharma (1986/87–2005) : R. Sharma
- Tim Smart (2005) : T. T. Smart
- Matt Stiller (2016/17–2017–18) : M. Stiller
