= 2006 ACC Trophy =

- Administrator: Asian Cricket Council
- Cricket format: 50 overs per side
- Tournament format: round robin with playoffs
- Host: Malaysia
- Champions: United Arab Emirates (4th title)
- Participants: 17
- Matches: 40
- Most runs: Arshad Ali (461)
- Most wickets: Afzaal Haider (14); Binod Das (14); Shadeep Silva (14)
- Official website: asiancricket.org

The 2006 ACC Trophy was a cricket tournament in Kuala Lumpur, Malaysia, taking place between 14 August and 26 August 2006. It gave associate and affiliate members of the Asian Cricket Council experience in international one-day cricket.

This was the last tournament in which all teams played in the same tournament. After this tournament, the Asian Cricket Council decided to split the tournament into two divisions. The top ten teams would be promoted to the 2008 ACC Trophy Elite and the rest of the teams would be relegated to the 2009 ACC Trophy Challenge.

== Teams ==
There were 17 teams that played in the tournament. These teams were non-test member nations of the Asian Cricket Council. The teams that played were:

- Afghanistan
- Bahrain
- Bhutan
- Brunei
- Hong Kong
- Iran
- Kuwait
- Malaysia
- Maldives
- Myanmar
- Nepal
- Oman
- Qatar
- Saudi Arabia
- Singapore
- Thailand
- United Arab Emirates

== Squads ==
Afghanistan	Bahrain	Bhutan	Brunei
Raees Ahmadzai (Captain) Dawlat Ahmadzai; Karim Sadiq; Noor Ali; Nowroz Mangal; Ahmed Shah; Naseer Khan; Mohammad Nabi; Samiullah Shenwari; Khaleqdaad Noori; Asghar Afghan; Hasti Gul; Hameed Hasan; Badshah Hassin; Taj Malik (Coach)	Qamar Saeed (Captain) Akmal Malik (Vice Captain); Mohammed Yaqoob; Asghar Bajwa; Abdul Waheed (Wicketkeeper); Tahir Dar; Shafeeq Ahmed; Mohammed Kabeer; Gayan de Silva; Azeem-ul-haq; Rizwan Baig; Ruwinda Kelly; Haroon Naseer Khan; Ashraf Mughal; Dharmesh Kumar; Amila Arunajith; Zafar Iqbal; Omran Ghani; Haroon Rashid (Coach)	Damber Singh Gurung; Lobzang Yonten; Jigme Singye; Phuntsho Wangdi; Tandin Wangchuk; Bikash Sharma Luital; Manoj Adhikari; Dorji Dakpa; Sonam Tobgay; Thinley Jamtsho; Tshering Dorji; Thinley Wangchuk Dorje; Tashi Tshering; Bikash Gurung; Kencho Norbu; Thinley Tenzin; Sushil Sharma Luital	Manzur Ahmed Sujay J Kamat; Manjunath DB; Mir Basharath Ahamed; Khalid Mehmood Khan; Stephen Whitely; Muhamed Shefeer Shereef; Arafat Mahbub Mukherjee J Ali Yousuf Sani; Ahmed Nafi; Mueed Ozair Mian; Packir Maideen Abdullah; Arun Korah Philip; Bilal Javed; Noor Alam Khan crickter

Hong Kong	Iran	Kuwait	Malaysia
Tim Smart (Captain) Tabarak Dar (Vice Captain); Afzaal Haider; Alexander French; Hussain Butt; Ilyas Gull; Irfan Ahmed; Jawaid Iqbal; Khalid Khan; Courtney Kruger; Nadeem Ahmed; Rahul Sharma; Amjid Mahmood; Najeeb Amar	Nariman Bakhtiar Mirza Abolghasemy; Manzoor Zakery; Zaven Khani; Atnan Zehi; Ebrahim Badrouzeh; Abdolvahab Ebrahimpour; Najib Arjmandi; Khalilal Nikbin; Mohammad Raeissi; Asef Bangolzehi; Rashed Bameri; Lal Mohammad Nour Ahmadi; Behrouz Arian	Mustansar Hassan; Hisham Mirza; Haji Saud Qamar; Mohammed Ali Ahmad; Nadeem Malik; Azmat Ullah Muhammed; Habib Ullah Iftikhar; Kashif Bashir Butt; Mohammed Nawaz; Rajeev Dilip Salvi; Jagath Roshantha; Shamshad Ahmed; Kashif Hussain; Abdul Rehman Liaqat; Ghayour Ahmed; Mubashir Khalid; Mohammad Hasan Arif	Suresh Navaratnam (Captain) Rakesh Madhevan; Rohan Selvaratnam; Ezrafiq Aziz; Suhan Kumar; Rohan Vishnu Suppiah; Anuar Arudin; Krishnamurthi Muniandy; Thushara Kodikara; Shukri Rahim; Mohammad Ariffin Ramli; Dinesh Sockalingham; Shafiq Sharif; Ahmad Faid Mohammad Noor; John Bailey (Coach)

Maldives	Myanmar	Nepal	Oman
Moosa Kaleem Ahmed Afzal Faiz; Abdullah Shahid; Ahmed Neesham Nasir; Husham Ibrahim; Ismail Nihad; Mohamed Azlee; Mohamed Mahafooz; Shafraz Jaleel; Hassan Ibrahim; Ahmed Umar; Muaviath Abdul Gani; Mohamed Aflah; Abdulla Shafeeu; Ahmed Hassan; Mohamed Saeed; Jilwaz Rasheed; Illyas Ahmed; Brendon Kuruppu (Coach); Ali Mohamed Manik (Manager)	Michael Moosajee (Captain) Hla Myo Kyaw; Sai Sai Wunna; Ye Myo Tun; Aye Min Than; Zin Min Swe; Tin Mg. Aye; Sulaiman; Omer; Zarkariya; Abdur Rehman; Abdul Rahman A Sharjeel; Yusuf; Mohammed; Soe Moe Win Aung; Naung Hlaing Tun; Aung Naing; Osama; Nazmul Abedeen (Coach); U Kyaw Naing (Manager); Hla Oo (Physio)	Akash Gupta; Basanta Regmi; Binod Das; Shakti Gauchan; Manoj Baishya; Paresh Lohani; Dhirendra Chand; Raj Pradhan; Sharad Vesawkar; Gyanendra Malla; Paras Khadka; Raju Basnyat; Mehboob Alam; Mahesh Chhetri; Roy Dias (Coach); Thakur Pratap Thapa (Manager); Jang Bahadur Magar (Physio)	Jitendra Redkar (Captain) Hemin Desai (Vice Captain); Ameet Sampat; Azhar Ali; Sultan Ahmed; Hemal Mehta; Khalid Rasheed; Adnan Sulheri; Awal Khan; Farhan Khan; Mohammed Aslam; Nilesh Parmar; Syed Tariq Hussain; Mohammad Asif; Sandesh Dhuri; Mudrirakkal Zakariya; Vivek Venkataram; Ansar Raza Ansari; Sandeep Patil (Coach)

Qatar	Saudi Arabia	Singapore	Thailand
Omer Taj (Captain) Muhammad Jahangir; Qamar Sadiq; Asif Abdul Rasheed; Kamran Khan; Abdul Aziz Abdul Wahid; Shahbaz Ahmad; Zaheerudin Ibrahim; Habib Zada; Tamoor Sajjad; Imranan Mirza; Usman Malik; Irfan Hussain; Packeer Anuwardeen; Abbas Khan; Pakkeer Sayabuddin; Pervaiz Khan; Venketeson Karthikeyan (Physio); Aruna De Silva (Coach); Nazar Mohammad Malik (Manager)	Nadeem Babar Rizwan Qayyum; Rashid Mirza; Hammad Saeed; Sarfraz Ahmed; Ghayyor; Fahad Suleiman; Mohammad Shehzad; Amjad Ali; Tanveer Hussain; Suhrab Kilsingatakam; Syed Abbas Hussain; Shahbaz Aslam; Mohammad Farooq; Mohammad Sufiyan; Khawar Sohail; Moazzam Khan	Chaminda Ruwan; Mohamed Shoib; Mulewa Dharmichand; Buddhika; Vivek Vedagiri; Pramodh Vijay Sriranga Singha Raja; Meyer Glenn Brendan; Iftekhar Haider; Peter Tharishnan Muruthi; Arun Vijayan; Kevin Robertson Andrew Hunter; Munish Arora; Yogesh Srinivasa Naik; Syed Zeeshan Raza Zaidi; Roy Dias; Thakur Pratap Thapa; Jang Bahadur Magar; Narendar Reddy Bonguram; Eric Jia-Le Leong; M. Jeevananthan	Zeeshan Khan John Hottinger; Nopphon Senamontree; Peerawat Duangtip; Saurabh Dhanuka; Shyam Sideek; Anil Tanwani; Deepak Saraff; Darshil Shah; Akshay Desai; Doug Kinsella; Vincent Albuquerque; Nirmal Rajendran; Richard Bowater; Sunil Nalinvilawan; Vaughan McClear

United Arab Emirates
Arshad Ali

Saqib Ali
Mohammad Iqbal
Khurram Khan
Kashif Khan
Javed Ismail
Fahad Usman
Abdul Rehman
Mohammad Tauqir
Ali Asad Abbas
Shadeep Silva
Qassim Zubair
Rameez Shahzad
Shoaib Sarwar
Chitrala Sudhakar (Physio)

== Group stage ==
Top two from each group qualifies for the quarterfinals.

=== Group A ===
==== Points table ====
Team	P	W	L	T	NR	NRR	Points
United Arab Emirates	3	3	0	0	0	+3.65	6
Malaysia	3	1	1	0	1	–1.02	3
Saudi Arabia	3	1	2	0	0	+1.91	2
Brunei	3	0	2	0	1	–6.71	1

Team qualifies for Quarterfinals
Team does not qualify for Quarterfinals

==== Fixtures ====
14 August 2006
scorecard

United Arab Emirates; 459/4 (50 overs)	v	Brunei; 92 all out (40.1 overs)
Arshad Ali 213* (146); DB Manjunath 2/23 (4 overs)		Stephen Whitely 24 (77); Khurram Khan 3/12 (6.1 overs)

United Arab Emirates won by 367 runs
Kinrara Oval, Kuala Lumpur
Umpires: Suresh Shastri (IND) and Siddique Khan (PAK)
Player of the match: Arshad Ali (UAE)

15 August 2006
scorecard

Malaysia; 304/4 (50 overs)	v	Saudi Arabia; 289 all out (49 overs)
Suresh Navaratnam 105* (73); Fahad Suleiman 1/25 (4 overs)		Suhrab Kilsingatakam 133 (120); Ezrafiq Aziz 5/28 (5 overs)

Malaysia won by 15 runs
Selangor Turf Club, Kuala Lumpur
Umpires: Buddhi Pradhan (NEP) and Mahbubur Rahman (BAN)
Player of the match: Ezrafiq Aziz (Malaysia)

16 August 2006
scorecard

Brunei; 43/2 (22 overs)	v	Malaysia
Stephen Whitely 16* (65); Thushara Kodikara 2/19 (10 overs)

No result
Club Aman, Kuala Lumpur
Umpires: Siddique Khan (PAK) and Buddhi Pradhan (NEP)

- Match abandoned due to rain

17 August 2006
scorecard

Saudi Arabia; 298/9 (50 overs)	v	United Arab Emirates; 299/7 (46.2 overs)
Hammad Saeed 101 (77); Arshad Ali 2/49 (7 overs)		Saqib Ali 132* (119); Fahad Suleiman 2/39 (10 overs)

United Arab Emirates won by 3 wickets
Bayuemas Oval, Kuala Lumpur
Umpires: Riazuddin (PAK) and Amiesh Saheba (IND)
Player of the match: Saqib Ali (UAE)

18 August 2006
scorecard

Saudi Arabia; 499/6 (50 overs)	v	Brunei; 155 all out (41.3 overs)
Sarfraz Ahmed 167* (95); Muhamed Shereef 2/143 (10 overs)		Bilal Javed 62 (42); Fahad Suleiman 4/28 (10 overs)

Saudi Arabia won by 314 runs (D/L)
Kinrara Oval, Kuala Lumpur
Umpires: Riazuddin (PAK) and Suresh Shastri (IND)
Player of the match: Sarfraz Ahmed (Saudi Arabia)

- Rain reduced Brunei's innings to 46 overs. Revised target is 470 in 46 overs.

19 August 2006
scorecard

Malaysia; 143 all out (49 overs)	v	United Arab Emirates; 146/2 (29.1 overs)
Dinesh Muthuraman 51 (99); Shadeep Silva 4/26 (10 overs)		Arshad Ali 83* (99); Thushara Kodikara 1/27 (8 overs)

United Arab Emirates won by 8 wickets
Kinrara Oval, Kuala Lumpur
Umpires: Siddique Khan (PAK) and Gamini Silva (SRI)
Player of the match: Arshad Ali (UAE)

=== Group B ===
==== Points table ====
Team	P	W	L	T	NR	NRR	Points
Singapore	3	2	0	0	1	+1.61	5
Bahrain	3	2	1	0	0	–0.21	4
Oman	3	1	2	0	0	–0.16	2
Maldives	3	0	2	0	1	–2.22	1

Team qualifies for Quarterfinals
Team does not qualify for Quarterfinals

==== Fixtures ====
14 August 2006
scorecard

Maldives; 170 all out (50 overs)	v	Oman; 172/3 (34 overs)
Abdullah Shahid 43 (34); Hemal Mehta 3/34 (10 overs)		Hemin Desai 67 (75); Moosa Kaleem 2/37 (10 overs)

Oman won by 7 wickets
Bayuemas Oval, Kuala Lumpur
Umpires: Buddhi Pradhan (NEP) and Sabaraiah Padzil
Player of the match: Hemin Desai (Oman)

15 August 2006
scorecard

Singapore; 256/4 (50 overs)	v	Bahrain; 170 all out (37.4 overs)
Munish Arora 111 (126); Shafeeq Ahmed 3/61 (9 overs)		Ashraf Mughal 45 (64); Buddhika Mendis 3/24 (7 overs)

Singapore won by 86 runs
Bayuemas Oval, Kuala Lumpur
Umpires: Riazuddin (PAK) and Suresh Shastri (IND)
Player of the match: Munish Arora (Singapore)

17 August 2006
scorecard

Singapore; 202/8 (50 overs)	v	Oman; 127 all out (30.3 overs)
Munish Arora 67 (90); Hemin Desai 3/22 (9 overs)		Awal Khan 31 (55); Pramodh Raja 3/24 (6.3 overs)

Singapore won by 75 runs
Royal Military College, Kuala Lumpur
Umpires: Siddique Khan (BAN) and Rohit Kotahachchi (SRI)
Player of the match: Chaminda Ruwan (Singapore)

18 August 2006
scorecard

Singapore; 148 all out (43.4 overs)	v	Maldives
Glenn Meyer 37 (81); Abdulla Shahid 3/28 (7.4 overs)

No result
Club Aman, Kuala Lumpur

- Match abandoned due to rain.

19 August 2006
scorecard

Bahrain; 283 all out (48.5 overs)	v	Oman; 264 all out (48.4 overs)
Azeem Mirza 91 (103); Hemin Desai 3/37 (7.5 overs)		Jitendra Redkar 54 (66); Awal Khan 54 (91); Qamar Saeed 3/58 (10 overs)

Bahrain won by 19 runs
Bayuemas Oval, Kuala Lumpur
Umpires: Mahbubur Rahman (BAN) and Amiesh Saheba (IND)
Player of the match: Azeem Mirza (Bahrain)

20 August 2006
scorecard

Bahrain; 270/5 (50 overs)	v	Maldives; 234/8 (50 overs)
Azeem-ul-Haq 102* (104); Husham Ibrahim 2/45 (8 overs); Abdulla Shahid 2/45 (10 overs)		Moosa Kaleem 130* (131); Shafeeq Ahmed 3/39 (8 over)

Bahrain won by 35 runs
Royal Military College, Kuala Lumpur
Umpires: Rohit Kottahachi (SRI) and Akhtar Uddin (BAN)
Player of the match: Azeem-ul-Haq (Bahrain)

=== Group C ===
==== Points table ====
Team	P	W	L	T	NR	NRR	Points
Nepal	4	4	0	0	0	+3.18	8
Hong Kong	4	2	1	1	0	+2.65	5
Kuwait	4	2	1	1	0	+2.62	5
Bhutan	4	1	3	0	0	–3.37	2
Myanmar	4	0	4	0	0	–8.72	0

Team qualifies for Quarterfinals
Team does not qualify for Quarterfinals

==== Fixtures ====
14 August 2006
scorecard

Kuwait; 204/7 (50 overs)	v	Nepal; 208/4 (47.3 overs)
Saud Qamar 44 (70); Binod Das 3/39 (8 overs)		Gyanendra Malla 79 (108); Habibullah Iftikhar 1/35 (8 overs)

Nepal won by 6 wickets
Club Aman, Kuala Lumpur
Umpires: Akhtar Uddin (BAN) and Rohit Kotahachchi (SRI)
Player of the match: Gyanendra Malla (Nepal)

15 August 2006
scorecard

Bhutan; 77 all out (30.4 overs)	v	Hong Kong; 81/1 (15 overs)
Extras (b 1, lb 4, w 16, nb 1) 22; Manoj Adhikari 15 (36); Hussain Butt 4/20 (8 overs)		Tim Smart 32* (49); Phuntsho Wangdi 1/26 (4 overs)

Hong Kong won by 9 wickets
Royal Selangor Club, Kuala Lumpur
Umpires: Sarika Prasad (Singapore) and Gamini Silva (SRI)

16 August 2006
scorecard

Myanmar; 133/9 (45 overs)	v	Kuwait; 138/1 (10 overs)
Abdul Rahman 31 (66); Kashif Butt 2/6 (3 overs)		Kashif Butt 60* (21); Sharjeel 1/40 (2 overs)

Kuwait won by 9 wickets
Kinrara Oval, Kuala Lumpur
Umpires: Rohit Kotahachchi (SRI) and Amiesh Saheba (IND)
Player of the match: Kashif Butt (Kuwait)

- Rain reduced match to 45 overs per side

16 August 2006
scorecard

Nepal; 317/8 (50 overs)	v	Bhutan; 36 all out (18.5 overs)
Paras Khadka 87 (68); Phuntsho Wangdi 3/60 (10 overs)		Bikash Luital 14 (20); Binod Das 5/24 (8 overs)

Nepal won by 281 runs
Royal Selangor Club, Kuala Lumpur
Umpires: Sarika Prasad (Singapore) and Mahbubur Rahman (BAN)

17 August 2006
scorecard

Hong Kong; 442/3 (50 overs)	v	Myanmar; 20 all out (12.3 overs)
Rahul Sharma 123 (103); Sulaiman 1/73 (7 overs)		Extras (b 0, lb 0, w 9, nb 0) 9 Sharjeel 5 (4); Najeeb Amar 6/2 (6 overs)

Hong Kong won by 422 runs
Selangor Turf Club, Kuala Lumpur
Umpires: Bhupinder Singh (Malaysia) and Mahbubur Rahman (BAN)
Player of the match: Rahul Sharma (Hong Kong)

18 August 2006
scorecard

Kuwait; 451/9 (50 overs)	v	Bhutan; 160 all out (46.1 overs)
Saud Qamar 122 (77); Lobzang Yonten 3/89 (10 overs)		Manoj Adhikari 28 (69); Saud Qamar 3/25 (10 overs)

Kuwait won by 291 runs
Selangor Turf Club, Kuala Lumpur
Umpires: Rohit Kottahachi (SRI) and Buddhi Pradhan (NEP)

19 August 2006
scorecard

Nepal; 211/7 (50 overs)	v	Hong Kong; 124 all out (43.3 overs)
Paresh Lohani 45 (96); Afzaal Haider 3/37 (10 overs)		Tim Smart 34 (63); Dhirendra Chand 4/31 (9 overs)

Nepal won by 87 runs
Kilat Club, Kuala Lumpur
Umpires: Sarika Prasad (Singapore) and Suresh Shastri (IND)
Player of the match: Dhirendra Chand (Nepal)

19 August 2006
scorecard

Myanmar; 76 all out (30.4 overs)	v	Bhutan; 77/1 (6.5 overs)
Mohamed 21 (27); Jigme Singye 5/14 (8.4 overs)		Bikash Sharma 34* (20); Sulaiman 1/10 (1 over)

Bhutan won by 9 wickets
Royal Military College, Kuala Lumpur
Umpires: Buddhi Pradhan (Nepal) and Bhupinder Singh (Malaysia)
Player of the match: Jigme Singye (Bhutan)

20 August 2006
scorecard

Kuwait; 253/8 (50 overs)	v	Hong Kong; 253/8 (50 overs)
Hisham Mirza 78 (101); Afzaal Haider 3/52 (10 overs)		Khalid Khan 74 (60); Azmatullah Muhammed 3/40 (10 over)

Match tied
Bayuemas Oval, Kuala Lumpur
Umpires: Siddique Khan (PAK) and Mahbubur Rahman (BAN)
Player of the match: Azmatullah Muhammed (Kuwait)

20 August 2006
scorecard

Myanmar; 10 all out (12.1 overs)	v	Nepal; 11/0 (0.2 overs)
Extras (b 0, lb 3, w 2, nb 0) 5 Zarkariya 1 (20); Mohammed 1 (3); Ye Myo Tun 1 (11); Zin Min Swe 1 (9); Yusuf 1 (11); Mehboob Alam 7/3 (6.1 overs)		Extras (b 0, lb 0, w 5, nb 0) 5 Mahesh Chhetri 3* (1); Dhirendra Chand 3* (1)

Nepal won by 10 wickets
Club Aman, Kuala Lumpur
Umpires: Sarika Prasad (Singapore) and Amiesh Saheba (IND)
Player of the match: Mehboob Alam (Nepal)

- Myanmar's score of 10 was the lowest in any level of men's international cricket.

=== Group D ===
==== Points table ====
Team	P	W	L	T	NR	NRR	Points
Afghanistan	3	3	0	0	0	+3.27	6
Qatar	3	2	1	0	0	+1.24	4
Thailand	3	1	2	0	0	–0.39	2
Iran	3	0	3	0	0	–3.87	0

Team qualifies for Quarterfinals
Team does not qualify for Quarterfinals

==== Fixtures ====
14 August 2006
scorecard

Afghanistan; 239/7 (50 overs)	v	Qatar; 173 all out (45.3 overs)
Raees Ahmadzai 70 (108); Saleem Akhtar 4/21 (10 overs)		Abdul Rasheed 60 (93); Naseer Khan 3/26 (9 overs)

Afghanistan won by 66 runs
Kilat Club, Kuala Lumpur
Umpires: Gamini Silva (SRI) and Bhupinder Singh (Malaysia)
Player of the match: Raees Ahmadzai (Afghanistan)

15 August 2006
scorecard

Iran; 152/9 (50 overs)	v	Thailand; 153/1 (34.4 overs)
Nariman Bakhtiar 57 (85); Shyam Sideek 4/18 (6 overs)		Richard Bowater 49* (87); Najib Arjmandi 1/27 (10 overs)

Thailand won by 9 wickets
Royal Military College, Kuala Lumpur
Player of the match: Shyam Sideek (Thailand)

16 August 2006
scorecard

Iran; 89/7 (42 overs)	v	Afghanistan; 90/1 (9 overs)
Ebrahim Badrouzeh 38 (122); Hamid Hassan 2/10 (6 overs)		Nowroz Mangal 49* (19); Manzoor Zakery 1/32 (4 overs)

Afghanistan won by 9 wickets
Selangor Turf Club, Kuala Lumpur
Umpires: Gamini Silva (SRI) and Akhtar Uddin (BAN)
Player of the match: Nowroz Mangal (Afghanistan)

- Rain reduced match to 42 overs per side

17 August 2006
scorecard

Thailand; 229 all out (49.2 overs)	v	Qatar; 233/3 (39.4 overs)
John Hottinger 50 (74); Qamar Sadiq 3/37 (10 overs)		Irfan Hussain 100 (97); Zeeshan Khan 2/47 (10 overs)

Qatar won by 7 wickets
Royal Selangor Club, Kuala Lumpur
Umpires: Akhtar Uddin (PAK) and Suresh Shastri (IND)
Player of the match: Irfan Hussain (Qatar)

18 August 2006
scorecard

Thailand; 117/9 (50 overs)	v	Afghanistan; 66/0 (9.1 overs)
Extras (b 1, lb 5, w 15, nb 14) 35; Shyam Sideek 30 (83); Dawlat Ahmadzai 3/20 (7 overs)		Karim Khan 41 (41)

Afghanistan won by 10 wickets (D/L)
Club Aman, Kuala Lumpur
Umpires: Sarika Prasad (Singapore) and Bhupinder Singh (Malaysia)
Player of the match: Nowroz Mangal (Afghanistan)

- Rain reduced Afghanistan's innings to 22 overs. Revised target is 64 runs in 22 overs.

20 August 2006
scorecard

Qatar; 355/7 (50 overs)	v	Iran; 136/8 (50 overs)
Omer Taj 178 (141); Abdolvahab Ebrahimpour 2/70 (7 overs)		Nariman Bakhtiar 68 (97); Saleem Akhtar 3/21 (10 overs)

Qatar won by 219 runs
Kilat Club, Kuala Lumpur
Umpires: Chandrasegaran (IND) and Riazuddin (PAK)
Player of the match: Omer Taj (Qatar)

== Quarterfinals ==
The teams that win their matches qualify for the semifinals. The losing teams compete for 5th place in the plate semifinals.

22 August 2006
scorecard

United Arab Emirates; 350/9 (50 overs)	v	Qatar; 239 all out (47.5 overs)
Khurram Khan 112 (102); Omer Taj 2/36 (4 overs)		Muhammad Jahangir 88 (103); Shadeep Silva 4/39 (10 overs)

United Arab Emirates won by 111 runs
Royal Selangor Club, Kuala Lumpur
Umpires: Rohit Kotahachi (SRI) and Siddique Khan (PAK)
Player of the match: Khurram Khan (UAE)

22 August 2006
scorecard

Nepal; 200/9 (50 overs)	v	Bahrain; 175/9 (50 overs)
Gyanendra Malla 57 (90); Qamar Saeed 4/35 (10 overs)		Tahir Dar 57* (59); Basanta Regmi 3/23 (10 overs)

Nepal won by 25 runs
Bayuemas Oval, Kuala Lumpur
Umpires: Gamini Silva (SRI) and Akhtar Uddin (BAN)
Player of the match: Basanta Regmi (NEP)

22 August 2006
scorecard

Malaysia; 169 all out (48.4 overs)	v	Afghanistan; 172/1 (27 overs)
Anuar Arudin 26* (36); Mohammad Nabi 3/18 (6.4 overs)		Nowroz Mangal 78* (89); Thushara Kodikara 1/24 (5 overs)

Afghanistan won by 9 wickets
Kinrara Oval, Kuala Lumpur
Umpires: Suresh Shastri (IND) and Mahbubur Rahman (BAN)
Player of the match: Ahmad Shah (AFG)

22 August 2006
scorecard

Singapore; 235/7 (50 overs)	v	Hong Kong; 239/4 (48.1 overs)
Munish Arora 65 (75); Irfan Ahmed 2/28 (4 overs)		Hussain Butt 100 (117); Arun Vijayan 3/49 (8 overs)

Hong Kong won by 6 wickets
Selangor Turf Club, Kuala Lumpur
Umpires: Amiesh Saheba (IND) and Riazuddin (PAK)
Player of the match: Hussain Butt (HKG)

== Semifinals ==
The teams that win their matches qualify for the final. The losing teams compete in the third place playoff.

24 August 2006
scorecard

Nepal; 103 all out (37 overs)	v	United Arab Emirates; 105/1 (20.3 overs)
Sharad Vesawkar 26 (50); Shadeep Silva 3/16 (10 overs)		Arshad Ali 75* (61); Shakti Gauchan 1/23 (7 overs)

United Arab Emirates won by 9 wickets
Kinrara Oval, Kuala Lumpur
Umpires: Suresh Shastri (IND) and Riazuddin (PAK)

24 August 2006
scorecard

Hong Kong; 158 all out (48.3 overs)	v	Afghanistan; 108/7 (35.2 overs)
Rahul Sharma 32 (90); Hasti Gul 2/21 (10 overs)		Karim Khan 31 (26); Najeeb Amar 2/10 (10 overs)

Hong Kong won by 18 runs (D/L)
Selangor Turf Club, Kuala Lumpur
Umpires: Amiesh Saheba (IND) and Rohit Kotahachi (SRI)

- Due to rain, the match was abandoned after 35.2 overs of the Afghanistan innings at which point, to have won on the Duckworth-Lewis calculation, they would have needed to be on 126. Afghanistan, however, were on 108 for 7.

== 3rd Place Playoff ==
25 August 2006
scorecard

Afghanistan; 270/8 (50 overs)	v	Nepal; 115/5 (37.4 overs)
Mohammad Nabi 60 (25); Paras Khadka 3/36 (7 overs)		Shakti Gauchan 42 (70); Ahmad Shah 3/33 (10 overs)

Afghanistan won by 64 (D/L)
Selangor Turf Club, Kuala Lumpur
Umpires: Suresh Shastri (IND) and Riazuddin (PAK)
Player of the match: Ahmad Shah (AFG)

- Due to rain, the match was abandoned after 37.4 overs of the Nepal innings at which stage, according to the Duckworth-Lewis calculations, par score for a tie was 179.
- Both Afghanistan and Nepal qualified for 5 as a result of this match.

== Final ==
26 August 2006
scorecard

Hong Kong; 174/8 (50 overs)	v	United Arab Emirates; 175/5 (35.3 overs)
Tim Smart 56 (107); Arshad Ali 3/35 (10 overs)		Khurram Khan 59* (71); Nadeem Ahmed 3/48 (10 overs)

United Arab Emirates won by 5 wickets
Kinrara Oval, Kuala Lumpur
Umpires: Amiesh Saheba (IND) and Gamini Silva (SRI)
Player of the match: Arshad Ali (UAE)

- Hong Kong qualified for WCL3 as a result of this match.

== Plate ==
24 August 2006
scorecard

Qatar; 223 all out (49 overs)	v	Bahrain; 132/4 (29.3 overs)
Muhammad Jahangir 70 (77); Qamar Saeed 3/37 (10 overs)		Ashraf Mughal 37 (42); Kamran Khan 2/36 (6 overs)

Bahrain won by 10 runs (D/L)
Kilat Club, Kuala Lumpur
Umpires: Sarika Prasad (Singapore) and Gamini Silva (SRI)
Player of the match: Muhammad Jahangir (Qatar)

- 5th place playoff semifinal 1
- Due to rain, the match was abandoned at 29.3 overs. According to the Duckwoth-Lewis method, par score for a win by Bahrain at that stage was 122.
- Singapore qualified for 2008 ICC World Cricket League Division Five as a result of this match.

24 August 2006
scorecard

Singapore; 212 all out (47.2 overs)	v	Malaysia; 188 all out (45.1 overs)
Munish Arora 68 (84); Thushara Kodikara 2/42 (8 overs)		Suresh Navaratnam 40 (50); Shoib Razzak 3/29 (8.1 overs)

Singapore won by 24 runs
Bayuemas Oval, Kuala Lumpur
Umpires: Siddique Khan (BAN) and Buddhi Pradhan (Nepal)
Player of the match: Buddhika Mendis (Singapore)

- 5th place playoff semifinal 2

25 August 2006
scorecard

Singapore; 192/9 (42 overs)	v	Bahrain; 88/4 (29.3 overs)
Buddhika Mendis 55 (57); Dharmesh Kumar 2/26 (9 overs)		Akmal Malik 33* (28); Shoib Razzak 2/2 (3 overs)

Singapore won by 25 runs (D/L)
Kilat Club, Kuala Lumpur
Umpires: Akhtar Uddin (BAN) and Buddhi Pradhan (Nepal)
Player of the match: Buddhika Mendis (Singapore)

- 5th place playoff
- Because of rain, the match was abandoned after 23 overs of the Bahrain innings when, according to the Duckworth-Lewis method, par score for a tie was 113.

25 August 2006
scorecard

Qatar; 220 all out (46.2 overs)	v	Malaysia; 170/3 (33.3 overs)
Muhammad Jahangir 59 (90); Ezrafiq Aziz 3/49 (10 overs)		Suhan Kumar 75 (104); Zaheeruddin 1/22 (7 overs)

Malaysia won by 45 runs (D/L)
Royal Military College, Kuala Lumpur
Umpires: Mahbubur Rahman (BAN) and Sarika Prasad (Singapore)
Player of the match: Suhan Kumar (Malaysia)

- 7th place playoff
- Due to rain, the match was abandoned after 33.3 overs of the Malaysia innings with the par score at that stage, according to the Duckworth-Lewis Method, being 125.

== Final placings ==
The top eight were ranked on their performance in the quarterfinals and playoffs. The rest were ranked based on the points and net run rate attained during the group stage.

Pos	Team	Promotion/Relegation	Qualification	
1st	United Arab Emirates	Promoted to 2008 ACC Trophy Elite	Qualified for 2008 Asia Cup	
2nd	Hong Kong	Promoted to 2008 ACC Trophy Elite	Qualified for 2008 Asia Cup	Qualified for 2007 ICC World Cricket League Division Three
3rd	Afghanistan	Promoted to 2008 ACC Trophy Elite	Qualified for 2008 ICC World Cricket League Division Five	
4th	Nepal	Promoted to 2008 ACC Trophy Elite	Qualified for 2008 ICC World Cricket League Division Five	
5th	Singapore	Promoted to 2008 ACC Trophy Elite	Qualified for 2008 ICC World Cricket League Division Five	
6th	Bahrain	Promoted to 2008 ACC Trophy Elite		
7th	Malaysia	Promoted to 2008 ACC Trophy Elite		
8th	Qatar	Promoted to 2008 ACC Trophy Elite		
9th	Kuwait	Promoted to 2008 ACC Trophy Elite		
10th	Saudi Arabia	Promoted to 2008 ACC Trophy Elite		
11th	Oman	Relegated to 2009 ACC Trophy Challenge		
12th	Thailand	Relegated to 2009 ACC Trophy Challenge		
13th	Bhutan	Relegated to 2009 ACC Trophy Challenge		
14th	Maldives	Relegated to 2009 ACC Trophy Challenge		
15th	Iran	Relegated to 2009 ACC Trophy Challenge		
16th	Brunei	Relegated to 2009 ACC Trophy Challenge		
17th	Myanmar	Relegated to 2009 ACC Trophy Challenge		

== Statistics ==
Most Runs		Most Wickets	
(United Arab Emirates) Arshad Ali	461	(Hong Kong) Afzaal Haider	14
(Hong Kong) Rahul Sharma	378	(Nepal) Binod Das	14
(Qatar) Mohammed Jahangir	364	(United Arab Emirates) Shadeep Silva	14
(Singapore) Munish Arora	346	(Hong Kong) Najeeb Amar	13
(United Arab Emirates) Saqib Ali	321	3 others with	11
