= Hong Kong cricket team in Ireland in 2016 =

International cricket tour

Hong Kong cricket team in Ireland 2016
	Ireland	Hong Kong
- Dates: 30 August 2016 – 6 September 2016
Captains	William Porterfield	Babar Hayat

Twenty20 International series
- Results: Hong Kong won the 2-match series 1–0
Most runs	Greg Thompson (44)	Nizakat Khan (62)
Most wickets	Four players with 1 wicket	Aizaz Khan (3)
- Player of the series: Nizakat Khan (HK)

The Hong Kong cricket team toured Ireland in August and September 2016 to play two Twenty20 Internationals (T20Is) matches at Bready Cricket Club Ground, Magheramason as well as a first-class match at Stormont, Belfast.

The first-class match was part of the 2015–17 ICC Intercontinental Cup, with Ireland winning by 70 runs. Hong Kong won the T20I series 1–0, after a 40-run victory in the first match and the second match being abandoned without a ball being bowled.

== Squads ==
Ireland	Hong Kong
William Porterfield (c); Peter Chase; George Dockrell; Ed Joyce; Josh Little; Andrew McBrine; ~~Barry McCarthy~~; Jacob Mulder; Kevin O'Brien; David Rankin; James Shannon; Sean Terry; Greg Thompson; Lorcan Tucker (wk); Craig Young	Babar Hayat (c); Tanwir Afzal; Nadeem Ahmed; Tanveer Ahmed; Christopher Carter; Aizaz Khan; Ehsan Khan; Nizakat Khan; Waqas Khan; Adil Mehmood; Ehsan Nawaz; Anshuman Rath; Ninad Shah; Shahid Wasif

Jacob Mulder was added to the squad as a replacement for Barry McCarthy, who was recalled to Durham for the County Championship.

== T20I series ==
=== 1st T20I ===
5 September 2016
Scorecard

Hong Kong; 169/5 (20 overs)	v	Ireland; 129 (19.3 overs)
Nizakat Khan 62 (43); Andy McBrine 1/22 (4 overs)		Greg Thompson 44 (32); Aizaz Khan 3/10 (3 overs)

Hong Kong won by 40 runs
Bready Cricket Club Ground, Magheramason
Umpires: Roland Black (Ire) and Alan Neill (Ire)

- Hong Kong won the toss and elected to bat.
- Roland Black (Ire) and Alan Neill (Ire) both stood in their first T20I match as umpires.
- Ehsan Khan, Shahid Wasif (HK); Josh Little, Jacob Mulder, Sean Terry, Greg Thompson and Lorcan Tucker (Ire) all made their T20I debuts.

=== 2nd T20I ===
6 September 2016
Scorecard

Ireland	v	Hong Kong

Match abandoned
Bready Cricket Club Ground, Magheramason
Umpires: Roland Black (Ire) and Alan Neill (Ire)

- No toss.
- The match was abandoned without a ball bowled due to a wet outfield.
