= Hong Kong cricket team in Scotland in 2016 =

International cricket tour

| | Scotland | Hong Kong |
- Dates: 8 September – 10 September 2016
| Captains | Preston Mommsen | Babar Hayat |

Twenty20 International series
- Results: Scotland won the 2-match series 1–0
| Most runs | Calum MacLeod (130) | Nizakat Khan (83) |
| Most wickets | Chris Sole (4); Con de Lange (4) | Ehsan Khan (3); Aizaz Khan (3) |

The Hong Kong cricket team toured Scotland in September 2016 to play two One Day International (ODI) matches at The Grange, Edinburgh, which was named as The Braidwood Cup. Scotland won the series 1–0.

== Squads ==
| Scotland | Hong Kong |
|---|---|
| Preston Mommsen (c); Richie Berrington; Kyle Coetzer; Matthew Cross (wk); Alasdair Evans; Con de Lange; Michael Leask; Calum MacLeod; Gavin Main; Safyaan Sharif; Chris Sole; Craig Wallace; Mark Watt | Babar Hayat (c); Tanwir Afzal; Nadeem Ahmed; Tanveer Ahmed; Christopher Carter; Aizaz Khan; Ehsan Khan; Nizakat Khan; Waqas Khan; Adil Mehmood; Ehsan Nawaz; Anshuman Rath; Ninad Shah; Shahid Wasif |

== ODI series ==
=== 1st ODI ===
8 September 2016
Scorecard

| Scotland; 153/6 (20 overs) | v | Hong Kong; 136/4 (18 overs) |
| Kyle Coetzer 53 (30); Ehsan Khan 2/28 (4 overs) | | Nizakat Khan 43 (26); Con de Lange 2/26 (4 overs) |

No result
The Grange, Edinburgh
Umpires: Gregory Brathwaite (WI) and Ian Ramage (Sco)

- Hong Kong won the toss and elected to field.
- The start of the match was delayed by rain for five-and-a-half hours and the game reduced to 21 overs per side.
- A further rain delay early in Scotland's innings reduced the game to 20 overs per side.
- Mark Watt (Sco), Ehsan Khan, Shahid Wasif and Tanveer Ahmed (HK) all made their ODI debuts.
- The match was abandoned due to bad light as the ground had no floodlights.

=== 2nd ODI ===
10 September 2016
Scorecard

| Scotland; 266/7 (50 overs) | v | Hong Kong; 213 (46.1 overs) |
| Calum MacLeod 102 (107); Tanveer Ahmed 2/50 (10 overs) | | Babar Hayat 56 (67); Chris Sole 4/28 (9 overs) |

Scotland won by 53 runs
The Grange, Edinburgh
Umpires: Gregory Brathwaite (WI) and Ian Ramage (Sco)

- Scotland won the toss and elected to bat.
