= 2010 National Cricket League Twenty20 =

Cricket tournament

2010 National Cricket League
- Dates: 11 April 2010 – 20 April 2010
- Administrator: Bangladesh Cricket Board
- Cricket format: Twenty20
- Tournament format(s): Round-robin and Knockout
- Host: Bangladesh
- Champions: Rajshahi Rangers
- Participants: 6
- Matches: 18
- Player of the series: Imrul Kayes
- Most runs: Imrul Kayes (228)
- Most wickets: Mukhtar Ali (12)
- Official website: www.nclt20.com

The 2010 National Cricket League Twenty20 (Bengali: ন্যাশনাল ক্রিকেট লিগ টি২০) tournament in Bangladesh, abbreviated as NCL 2010 or NCL T20 2010 or Destiny Group NCL T20 2009-10, played in April 2010, was the first edition of a Twenty20 league involving the teams in the National Cricket League (NCL). The tournament was initiated by the Bangladesh Cricket Board (BCB). It included six teams representing the divisions of Bangladesh. It was a limited success and has effectively been replaced by the Bangladesh Premier League (BPL). The tournament was won by the Rajshahi Rangers who defeated the Kings of Khulna by 6 wickets in the final at the Sher-e-Bangla National Cricket Stadium in Dhaka, the winning team's Qaiser Abbas being named "Man of the Match".

== Background ==
Bangladesh Cricket Board launched the first-ever National Cricket League T20 competition to be played from April 11 to 20 to prepare the national cricketers for the 2010 World Twenty20.

== Participating teams ==
The following six teams participated in the tournament.

1. Barisal Blazers
2. Cyclone of Chittagong
3. Dhaka Dynamites
4. Kings of Khulna
5. Rajshahi Rangers
6. Sultans of Sylhet

=== Franchises ===
Six companies bid to buy a team in the tournament. The companies went into a lottery of which they were to pick one of six "iconic" players from Bangladesh who were perceived to have outstanding ability. Each company then picked three of 18 players who had represented the Bangladesh national cricket team. They were categorised into a certain class, getting paid a certain amount of money. No player could cost more than 400,000 Taka.

=== Icon players ===
Each franchise had an "icon" player. Although originally suggested to have player auction, due to the shortage of time players were divided into Grades: A+, A, B, C, D with the A+ players receiving 4 lakh Bangladeshi Taka. Each team was allowed to list up to 6 foreign players but play a maximum of two. Most foreign players were from the Indian subcontinent including Shoaib Akhtar (Cyclones of Chittagong). Rajshahi Rangers signed Aiden Blizzard from Victoria, Australia.

Team	Icon Player	Team captain
Barisal Blazers	Shahriar Nafees	
Cyclones of Chittagong	Tamim Iqbal	Nafees Iqbal
Dhaka Dynamites	Mohammad Ashraful	
Kings of Khulna	Shakib Al Hasan	
Rajshahi Rangers	Naeem Islam	Khaled Mashud
Sultan of Sylhet	Alok Kapali	Mashrafe Mortaza

== Summary ==
=== Final standings ===
Team	Pld	W	L	NR	Pts	NRR
Dhaka Dynamites	5	5	0	0	10	+1.119
Sultans of Sylhet	5	4	1	0	8	+0.392
Rajshahi Rangers	5	2	3	0	4	-0.373
Kings of Khulna	5	2	3	0	4	+0.393
Barisal Blazers	5	1	4	0	2	-0.779
Cyclones of Chittagong	5	1	4	0	2	-0.830

=== Head-to-head chart ===
Home team win	Away team win

	Barisal Blazers	Cyclones of Chittagong	Dhaka Dynamites	Kings of Khulna	Rajshahi Rangers	Sultans of Sylhet
Barisal Blazers		Chittagong; 8 wickets	Dhaka; 6 wickets	Khulna; 45 runs	Barisal; 7 wickets	Sylhet; 4 wickets
Cyclones of Chittagong	Chittagong; 8 wickets		Dhaka; 17 runs	Khulna; 78 runs	Rajshahi; 6 wickets	Sylhet; 5 wickets
Dhaka Dynamites	Dhaka; 6 wickets	Dhaka; 17 runs		Dhaka; 7 wickets	Dhaka; 8 wickets	Dhaka; 40 runs
Kings of Khulna	Khulna; 45 runs	Khulna; 78 runs	Dhaka; 7 wickets		Rajshahi; 36 runs	Sylhet; 37 runs
Rajshahi Rangers	Rajshahi; 7 wickets	Rajshahi; 6 wickets	Dhaka; 8 wickets	Rajshahi; 36 runs		Sylhet; 26 runs
Sultans of Sylhet	Sylhet; 4 wickets	Sylhet; 5 wickets	Dhaka; 40 runs	Sylhet; 37 runs	Sylhet; 26 runs	

== Fixture ==
11 April
Scorecard

Chittagong; 132 (19.3 overs)	v	Rajshahi; 133/4 (17.1 overs)
Uttam Sarkar 51 (29); Mukhtar Ali 3/22 (4 overs)		Naeem Islam 56* (37); Nasir Hossain 1/14 (3 overs)

Rajshahi won by 6 wickets
Sher-e-Bangla Cricket Stadium, Mirpur
Umpires: Anisur Rahman and Sharfuddoula
Player of the match: Mukhtar Ali (Rajshahi)

- Rajshahi won the toss and elected to field.
- Twenty20 debuts Enamul Haque jnr, Faisal Hossain, Nafees Iqbal, Nasir Hossain, Sharifullah and Uttam Sarkar (Chittagong); Hannan Sarkar, Khaled Mashud, Mukhtar Ali, Sanjamul Islam and Shuvagoto Hom (Rajshahi).

12 April
Scorecard

Chittagong; 152/7 (20 overs)	v	Sylhet; 153/5 (18.5 overs)
Tamim Iqbal 91 (60); Mashrafe Mortaza 2/34 (4 overs)		Alok Kapali 49* (39); Rubel Hossain 2/37 (3 overs)

Sylhet won by 5 wickets
Sher-e-Bangla Cricket Stadium, Mirpur
Umpires: Mahfuzur Rahman and Masudur Rahman
Player of the match: Tamim Iqbal (Sylhet)

- Sylhet won the toss and elected to field.
- Twenty20 debuts Saqlain Sajib (Chittagong); Ariful Haque, Mosharraf Hossain, Nazmul Hossain Milon and Rashid Hanif (Sylhet).

12 April
Scorecard

Barisal; 149/7 (20 overs)	v	Dhaka; 151/4 (19.1 overs)
Raqibul Hasan 43 (40); Nabil Samad 2/28 (4 overs)		Shamsur Rahman 41 (23); Syed Rasel 1/27 (4 overs) Arafat Sunny 1/27 (4 overs)

Dhaka won by 6 wickets
Sher-e-Bangla Cricket Stadium, Mirpur
Umpires: Anisur Rahman and Masudur Rahman
Player of the match: Shamsur Rahman (Dhaka)

- Dhaka won the toss and elected to field.

12 April
Scorecard

Rajshahi; 177/9 (20 overs)	v	Khulna; 141 (19.3 overs)
Hannan Sarkar 44 (22); Farhad Hossain 3/11 (3 overs)		Farhad Hossain 41* (32); Mukhtar Ali 5/22 (4 overs)

Rajshahi won by 36 runs
BKSP Stadium, Savar
Umpires: Gazi Sohel and Tanvir Ahmed
Player of the match: Mukhtar Ali (Rajshahi)

- Rajshahi won the toss and elected to bat.

13 April
Scorecard

Rajshahi; 115 (19.1 overs)	v	Barisal; 118/3 (16.1 overs)
Aiden Blizzard 39 (26); Mahmudul Hasan 3/16 (3 overs)		Raqibul Hasan 36 (25); Naeem Islam 2/20 (4 overs)

Barisal won by 3 wickets
Sher-e-Bangla Cricket Stadium, Mirpur
Umpires: Sharfuddoula and Tanvir Ahmed
Player of the match: Mahmudul Hasan (Rajshahi)

- Barisal won the toss and elected to field.

13 April
Scorecard

Khulna; 180/7 (20 overs)	v	Chittagong; 102/7 (20 overs)
Imrul Kayes 71 (48); Faisal Hossain 3/17 (2 overs)		Nasir Hossain 24 (39); Nuwan Zoysa 4/26 (4 overs)

Khulna won by 78 runs
Sher-e-Bangla Cricket Stadium, Mirpur
Umpires: Sharfuddoula and Masudur Rahman
Player of the match: Imrul Kayes (Khulna)

- Khulna won the toss and elected to bat.

13 April
Scorecard

Dhaka; 133/6 (20 overs)	v	Sylhet; 93 (17.3 overs)
Mehrab Hossain, Jr. 58 (44); Mashrafe Mortaza 3/24 (4 overs)		Alok Kapali 33 (34); Mohammad Rafique 4/7 (3.3 overs)

Dhaka won by 40 runs
BKSP Stadium, Savar
Umpires: Mahbubur Rahman and Mahfuzur Rahman
Player of the match: Mohammad Rafique (Dhaka)

- Sylhet won the toss and elected to field.

15 April
Scorecard

Sylhet; 182/6 (20 overs)	v	Rajshahi; 156/8 (20 overs)
Alok Kapali 62 (38); Suhrawadi Shuvo 3/33 (4 overs)		Shuvagoto Hom 51 (24); Mosharraf Hossain 3/23 (4 overs)

Sylhet won by 26 runs
Sher-e-Bangla Cricket Stadium, Mirpur
Umpires: Anisur Rahman and Mahfuzur Rahman
Player of the match: Fariduddin (Sylhet)

- Sylhet won the toss and elected to bat.

15 April
Scorecard

Barisal; 92 (17.2 overs)	v	Chittagong; 95/2 (13.5 overs)
Shahriar Nafees 30 (33); Kamrul Islam 4/23 (3 overs)		Tamim Iqbal 65 (51); Ziaur Rahman 1/16 (2 overs)

Chittagong won by 8 wickets
BKSP Stadium, Savar
Umpires: Gazi Sohel and Tanvir Ahmed
Player of the match: Kamrul Islam (Chittagong)

- Chittagong won the toss and elected to field.

15 April
Scorecard

Khulna; 124/8 (20 overs)	v	Dhaka; 127/3 (18.5 overs)
Mahela Udawatte 33 (19); Mohammad Ashraful 3/20 (4 overs)		Shamsur Rahman 51 (52); Shakib Al Hasan 1/15 (4 overs)

Dhaka won by 7 wickets
Sher-e-Bangla Cricket Stadium, Mirpur
Umpires: Anisur Rahman and Masudur Rahman
Player of the match: Mohammad Ashraful (Dhaka)

- Khulna won the toss and elected to bat.

16 April
Scorecard

Dhaka; 155 (20 overs)	v	Chittagong; 138/3 (20 overs)
Jeewan Mendis 32 (28); Rubel Hossain 5/32 (4 overs)		Faisal Hossain 43 (37); Mohammad Ashraful 3/22 (4 overs)

Dhaka won by 17 runs
Sher-e-Bangla Cricket Stadium, Mirpur
Umpires: Morshed Ali Khan and Sharfuddoula
Player of the match: Rubel Hossain (Chittagong)

- Chittagong won the toss and elected to field.

16 April
Scorecard

Barisal; 119 (19.5 overs)	v	Sylhet; 120/6 (19.1 overs)
Jeevantha Kulatunga 26 (17); Fariduddin 2/14 (3 overs)		Indika de Saram* 39 (39); Mahmudul Hasan 1/10 (3.1 overs)

Sylhet won by 4 wickets
Sher-e-Bangla Cricket Stadium, Mirpur
Umpires: Gazi Sohel and Morshed Ali Khan
Player of the match: Indika de Saram (Sylhet)

- Barisal won the toss and elected to bat.

17 April
Scorecard

Sylhet; 150/8 (20 overs)	v	Khulna; 113/7 (20 overs)
Kaushalya Weeraratne 47 (32); Abdur Razzak 2/19 (4 overs)		Farhad Hossain 26 (34); Fariduddin 3/16 (4 overs)

Sylhet won by 37 runs
Sher-e-Bangla Cricket Stadium, Mirpur
Umpires: AFM Akhtaruddin and Mahbubur Rahman
Player of the match: Fariduddin (Sylhet)

- Sylhet won the toss and elected to bat.

17 April
Scorecard

Rajshahi; 83/7 (20 overs)	v	Dhaka; 84/2 (15 overs)
Suhrawadi Shuvo 33 (35); Mohammad Rafique 2/6 (4 overs)		Thilina Kandamby 43 (39); Sanjamul Islam 2/24 (4 overs)

Dhaka won by 8 wickets
Sher-e-Bangla Cricket Stadium, Mirpur
Umpires: AFM Akhtaruddin and Tanvir Ahmed
Player of the match: Shahadat Hossain (Dhaka)

- Rajshahhi won the toss and elected to bat.

18 April
Scorecard

Khulna; 139 (20 overs)	v	Barisal; 94 (18 overs)
Imrul Kayes 36 (33); Syed Rasel 3/24 (4 overs)		Jeevantha Kulatunga 23 (20); Abdur Razzak 3/17 (4 overs)

Khulna won by 45 runs
Sher-e-Bangla Cricket Stadium, Mirpur
Umpires: Gazi Sohel and Masudur Rahman
Player of the match: Abdur Razzak (Khulna)

- Barisal won the toss and elected to field.

== Knock-out stage ==
Semi-finals
1	Dhaka Dynamites	130 (19.5 overs)
3	Rajshahi Rangers	142/6 (20 overs)
2	Sultans of Sylhet	131/8 (20 overs)
4	Kings of Khulna	134/4 (19. 4 overs)

Final
SF1	Rajshahi Rangers	163/4 (19.2 overs)
SF2	Kings of Khulna	161/6 (20 overs)

== Media ==
ATN Bangla televised all matches live and showcased highlights. The official website was www.nclT20.com. All of the matches were played at the Sher-e-Bangla Cricket Stadium and BKSP in Dhaka, Bangladesh.
