= Zain Abbas =

Zain Abbas may refer to:

- Zain Abbas (Hong Kong cricketer) (born 1986)
- Zain Abbas (Pakistani cricketer) (born 1991)
