= Zain Abbas (Hong Kong cricketer) =

Pakistani-born cricketer (born 1986)

Personal information
- Full name: Zain Abbas
- Born: 16 April 1986 (age 40); Pakistan
- Batting: Right-handed
- Bowling: Right-arm medium
- Role: All-rounder

International information
- National side: Hong Kong
- Only ODI (cap 20): 24 June 2008 v Pakistan

Career statistics
Competition	ODI
Matches	1
Runs scored	26
Batting average	–
100s/50s	0/0
Top score	26*
Balls bowled	36
Wickets	1
Bowling average	56.00
5 wickets in innings	0
10 wickets in match	0
Best bowling	1/56
Catches/stumpings	0/–
- Source: CricketArchive, 29 November 2008

Zain Abbas (born 16 April 1986) is a Pakistani-born cricketer who has played one One Day International for Hong Kong.In his debut and only ODI game for Hong Kong in the 2008 Asia Cup, against Pakistan, Zain's 26 was the highest individual score for the Hong Kong team before he had to be retire hurt.
