= Moonamchery Michal =

Omani cricketer (born 1983)

Sindo Michael
Personal information
- Full name: Sindo Michael Moonamchery Veedu
- Born: 18 May 1983 (age 43); Thrissur, Kerala, India
- Batting: Right-handed
- Bowling: Right-arm medium-fast

International information
- National side: Oman (2015–2022)
- Source: ESPNcricinfo, 24 April 2019

Sindo Michael (born 18 May 1983) is an Indian-born cricketer who played for the Oman national cricket team. He made his List A debut for Oman against Scotland on 19 February 2019, following the 2018–19 Oman Quadrangular Series. Earlier, he was named in Oman's squad for the 2018 ACC Emerging Teams Asia Cup tournament. In March 2019, he was named in Oman's team for the 2019 ICC World Cricket League Division Two tournament in Namibia. He made his highest score, 34, against Scotland, on 22 February 2019.
