= Nasir Hameed =

Pakistani-born Hong Kong cricketer (born 1969)

Personal information
- Full name: Nasir Hameed
- Born: 4 April 1969 (age 57); Rawalpindi, Pakistan
- Batting: Right-handed
- Role: Wicket-keeper

International information
- National side: Hong Kong
- Only ODI (cap 13): 18 July 2004 v Pakistan

Career statistics
| Competition | ODI | FC |
|---|---|---|
| Matches | 1 | 2 |
| Runs scored | 0 | 41 |
| Batting average | 0.00 | 13.66 |
| 100s/50s | 0/0 | 0/0 |
| Top score | 0 | 32 |
| Catches/stumpings | 0/0 | 5/0 |
- Source: ESPNcricinfo, 22 January 2011

Nasir Hameed (born April 4, 1969) is a Pakistani-born Hong Kong former cricketer who has appeared once at One Day International level, against Pakistan in the 2004 Asia Cup. He opened the batting with Tim Smart, but was dismissed for 0.

Hameed coached the Hong Kong women's national cricket team in its inaugural international series against Pakistan in 2006.
