= Manoj Baishya =

Nepalese cricketer

Personal information
- Full name: Manoj Kumar Baishya
- Born: 25 March 1980 (age 46); Nepal
- Batting: Right-handed
- Role: Wicket-keeper

International information
- National side: Nepal

Domestic team information
- Years: Team
- 2004–2010: Nepalgunj

Career statistics
Competition	First-class
Matches	12
Runs scored	1
Batting average	4.00
100s/50s	0/0
Top score	1
Catches/stumpings	0/0
- Source: CricketArchive, 1 March 2008

Manoj Kumar Baishya (born 25 March 1980) is a former Nepalese cricketer. Manoj is a right-handed batsman and a wicket-keeper. He made his debut for Nepal against PNG in February 2005.

He represents the Region no. 5 Nepalgunj of the National League.

== Playing career ==
Born in Nepal in 1981, Manoj Baishya first represented his country at Under-19 level, playing in the 2000 Under-19 World Cup in Sri Lanka. It was five years before he made his début for the senior side, when he played for Nepal in the repêchage tournament of the 2005 ICC Trophy, in which Nepal finished third after beating Qatar in a play-off.

Later in 2005 he played ACC Fast Track Countries Tournament matches against Singapore, the UAE and Hong Kong. The games against the UAE and Hong Kong also counted towards the 2005 ICC Intercontinental Cup and are his only first-class matches to date.

In 2006 he played for Nepal on a tour of Pakistan and most recently represented his country at the 2006 ACC Trophy in Malaysia.

He is now working as a head of ECA department in Trinity International College, Dillibazar, Kathmandu.
