= Zahid Shah =

Personal information
- Born: 8 June 1980 (age 46); Peshawar, North-West Frontier Province, Pakistan
- Batting: Right-handed
- Bowling: Right-arm fast-medium
- Role: Bowler

International information
- National side: UAE
- ODI debut (cap 37): 24 June 2008 v Bangladesh
- Last ODI: 26 June 2008 v Sri Lanka

Domestic team information
- Years: Team
- 1997/98: Peshawar

Career statistics
Competition	ODI	FC	LA
Matches	2	6	16
Runs scored	11	74	81
Batting average	–	12.33	11.57
100s/50s	0/0	0/0	0/0
Top score	6*	29	25*
Balls bowled	120	802	567
Wickets	6	15	24
Bowling average	16.33	35.86	21.25
5 wickets in innings	0	0	0
10 wickets in match	0	0	0
Best bowling	3/49	4/53	4/53
Catches/stumpings	0/–	0/–	0/–
- Source: CricketArchive, 22 January 2011

Zahid Shah (born 8 June 1980) is a Pakistani-born cricketer who played for the United Arab Emirates national cricket team. He is a right-arm fast-medium bowler.

Shah made his ODI debut against Bangladesh in the 2008 Asia Cup. He took six wickets in the two matches of the tournament that he played, claiming 3 wickets for 49 runs against Bangladesh on 24 June 2008, and identical bowling figures (3/49) against Sri Lanka two days later.
