= Suleman Shafqat =

Pakistani cricketer (born 2001)

Personal information
- Full name: Suleman Shafqat
- Born: 3 March 2001 (age 25)
- Source: Cricinfo, 25 December 2018

Suleman Shafqat (born 3 March 2001) is a Pakistani cricketer. He made his List A debut for the Pakistan Emerging Team against the Bangladesh Emerging Team in the 2018 ACC Emerging Teams Asia Cup on 9 December 2018. Prior to his List A debut, he was named in Pakistan's squad for the 2018 Under-19 Cricket World Cup.
