= Sean Terry =

Irish cricketer

Personal information
- Full name: Sean Paul Terry
- Born: 1 August 1991 (age 35); Southampton, Hampshire, England
- Nickname: Fergus, Big Ferg, Mendo
- Height: 5 ft 11 in (1.80 m)
- Batting: Right-handed
- Bowling: Right-arm off break
- Role: Batsman
- Relatives: VP Terry (father)

International information
- National side: Ireland (2016–2018)
- ODI debut (cap 50): 14 July 2016 v Afghanistan
- Last ODI: 27 September 2016 v Australia
- ODI shirt no.: 10
- Only T20I (cap 38): 5 September 2016 v Hong Kong

Domestic team information
- Years: Team
- 2012–2015: Hampshire (squad no. 10)
- 2016: Northamptonshire
- 2016–2018: Leinster Lightning
- 2019: Perth Scorchers

Career statistics
Competition	ODI	T20I	FC	LA
Matches	5	1	19	21
Runs scored	32	4	713	357
Batting average	6.40	4.00	26.40	21.00
100s/50s	0/0	0/0	0/7	0/3
Top score	16	4	62*	65
Catches/stumpings	2/–	1/–	14/–	6/–
- Source: ESPNCricinfo, 23 June 2018

Sean Paul Terry (born 1 August 1991 in Southampton, Hampshire) is a former English-born Irish cricketer. Terry is a right-handed batsman who bowls right-arm off break for Leinster, Northamptonshire and Ireland. He made his One Day International (ODI) debut for Ireland on 14 July 2016 against Afghanistan. He made his Twenty20 International (T20I) debut against Hong Kong on 5 September 2016.

He retired from all forms of professional cricket in July 2018. However, he returned to the professional scene in February 2019, being selected to play in the Perth Scorchers final game of the 2018–19 Big Bash League season, after performing well for the Melville Cricket Club in Western Australian Grade Cricket.

== Early life ==
The son of former England and Hampshire batsman Paul Terry, he spent much of his early life in Australia, where he was educated at Aquinas College, Perth, and the University of Notre Dame in Fremantle. While living in Australia, he also represented Western Australia at under-19 level.

In November 2011, he joined Hampshire on a two-year development contract. It was in that same year that he joined the MCC Young Cricketers programme at Lord's.

== Hampshire career ==
Terry made his first-class debut for Hampshire in their first fixture of the 2012 season against Loughborough MCCU at the Rose Bowl on 6 April. He made his maiden first-class fifty in this match, making an unbeaten 59 in Hampshire's first-innings of 445/7 declared. He also took two catches in a match which Hampshire won by 274 runs.

Due to the unavailability of Hampshire captain James Adams for Hampshire's County Championship match against Leicestershire, Terry was called up to replace the opening batsman and make his debut in the County Championship. He was dismissed for a duck in Hampshire's first-innings by Alex Wyatt.

== Irish career ==
In April 2016, Terry declared that he is moving to Dublin to pursue his ambitions playing for Ireland national cricket team and signed a contract with YMCA Cricket Club. He qualified to play for Ireland through his mother, Bernadette, who is Irish and is from Walkinstown near Dublin.

He made his first-class debut for Northamptonshire versus Sussex at Arundel during June 2016.

In June 2016, he was named in Ireland's One Day International squad for their series against Afghanistan, scheduled to take place the following month. He made his ODI debut on 14 July.
