= Fahad Alhashmi =

United Arab Emirates cricketer (born 1982)

Personal information
- Full name: Fahad Afdhal Alhashmi
- Born: 31 July 1982 (age 44); Dubai, United Arab Emirates
- Batting: Right-handed
- Bowling: Right-arm fast-medium
- Role: Bowler

International information
- National side: United Arab Emirates
- ODI debut (cap 33): 24 June 2008 v Bangladesh
- Last ODI: 12 March 2015 v South Africa

Career statistics
Competition	ODI	First-class
Matches	5	7
Runs scored	0	65
Batting average	0.00	7.22
100s/50s	0/0	0/0
Top score	0	21
Balls bowled	224	636
Wickets	6	11
Bowling average	33.66	37.36
5 wickets in innings	0	0
10 wickets in match	0	0
Best bowling	2/39	3/40
Catches/stumpings	0/–	4/–
- Source: CricketArchive, 27 September 2008

Fahad Afdhal Alhashmi (Arabic: فهد الهاشمي; born 31 July 1982) is an Emirati cricketer. A right-handed batsman and right-arm fast-medium bowler, he has played for the United Arab Emirates national cricket team since 2005, and first played One Day International (ODI) cricket in 2008.

== Biography ==
Born in Dubai in 1982, Fahad Alhashmi first played for the UAE in the 2005 ICC Intercontinental Cup semi-final against Ireland. He played once against Namibia in 2006, once against Bermuda in 2007 and four matches in the tournament in 2008.

In March 2008, he played for the UAE in matches against English county sides Essex, Lancashire and Yorkshire. He made his ODI debut against Bangladesh in the 2008 Asia Cup and most recently represented his country in the 2015 Cricket World Cup against South Africa.
