= Shahid Wasif =

Hong Kong cricketer (born 1997)

Personal information
- Born: 15 May 1997 (age 29); Attock, Punjab, Pakistan
- Batting: Right handed
- Bowling: Right arm off break
- Role: Wicket-keeper batter

International information
- National side: Hong Kong (2016–present)
- ODI debut (cap 36): 8 September 2016 v Scotland
- Last ODI: 10 March 2018 v Zimbabwe
- T20I debut (cap 23): 5 September 2016 v Ireland
- Last T20I: 12 October 2026 v Maldives

Career statistics
Competition	ODI	T20I	LA
Matches	10	22	26
Runs scored	81	300	359
Batting average	11.57	20.00	17.09
100s/50s	0/0	0/1	0/1
Top score	45	50	68
Catches/stumpings	2/–	9/–	14/1
- Source: ESPNcricinfo, 16 March 2023

Shahid Wasif (born 15 May 1997) is a Pakistani-born Hong Kong cricketer. He is a right-handed batsman and right-arm off break bowler. He made his Twenty20 International (T20I) debut against Ireland on 5 September 2016. He made his One Day International (ODI) debut against Scotland on 8 September 2016.

In December 2018, he was named in Hong Kong's team for the 2018 ACC Emerging Teams Asia Cup. In April 2019, he was named in Hong Kong's squad for the 2019 ICC World Cricket League Division Two tournament in Namibia. In September 2019, he was named in Hong Kong's squad for the 2019 ICC T20 World Cup Qualifier tournament in the United Arab Emirates. In November 2019, he was named in Hong Kong's squad for the 2019 ACC Emerging Teams Asia Cup in Bangladesh and for the Cricket World Cup Challenge League B tournament in Oman.
