= 2018 ACC Emerging Teams Asia Cup =

Cricket tournament

- Dates: 6 – 15 December 2018
- Administrator: Asian Cricket Council
- Cricket format: List A
- Tournament format(s): Group and Knockout
- Hosts: Sri Lanka; Pakistan
- Champions: Sri Lanka U23 (2nd title)
- Runners-up: India U23
- Participants: 8
- Matches: 15
- Player of the series: (Sri Lanka) Kamindu Mendis
- Most runs: (Sri Lanka) Kamindu Mendis (310)
- Most wickets: (India) Mayank Markande (12)

The 2018 ACC Emerging Teams Asia Cup was the third edition of the ACC Emerging Teams Asia Cup held in Karachi, Pakistan and Colombo, Sri Lanka. Eight teams participated in the tournament including five under-23 age level teams of Test nations and top three teams from the 2018 Asia Cup Qualifier. This tournament was organized by the Asian Cricket Council (ACC). Initially, Pakistan was the sole host for the tournament but India and BCCI refused to send Indian players to Pakistan. Following the increasing political tensions between India and Pakistan, the ACC announced that Sri Lanka would be the co-host whilst India's matches and knockout stage will be played there. The U-23 teams from India, Bangladesh, Sri Lanka and Pakistan qualified for the semi-finals. Sri Lanka's U-23 defeated India U-23 by 3 runs in the final to win the tournament.

== Teams ==
Group A	Group B
India U23	Pakistan U23
Sri Lanka U23	Bangladesh U23
Afghanistan U23	Hong Kong (Qualifier) (1st)
United Arab Emirates (Qualifier) (2nd)	Oman (Qualifier) (3rd)

== Squads ==
Afghanistan U23	Bangladesh U23	Hong Kong	India U23
Najibullah Zadran (c); Azmatullah Omarzai; Darwish Rasooli; Fazal Haque; Ibrahim Zadran; Ihsan Janat; Ikram Ali Khil (wk); Karim Janat; Nasir Jamal; Qais Ahmad; Rahmanullah Gurbaz; Shahidullah; Wafadar Momand; Zahir Khan; Zia-ur-Rehman	Nurul Hasan (c & wk); Mosaddek Hossain; Najmul Hossain Shanto; Mizanur Rahman; Shafiul Islam; Zakir Hasan; Saif Hassan; Yasir Ali; Tanvir Islam; Afif Hossain; Naeem Hasan; Shoriful Islam; Qazi Onik; Mohor Sheikh; Khaled Ahmed	Aizaz Khan (c); Aftab Hussain; Arshad Mohammad; Babar Hayat; Ehsan Khan; Ehsan Nawaz; Hamed Khan; Mohammad Ghazanfar; Mohammad Hassan; Nizakat Khan; Raag Kapur; Shahid Wasif (wk); Tanveer Ahmed; Tanwir Afzal; Waqas Khan	Jayant Yadav (c); Ankush Bains (wk); Siddharth Desai; Ruturaj Gaikwad; Himmat Singh; Deepak Hooda; Mayank Markande; Shams Mulani; Prabhsimran Singh (wk); Prasidh Krishna; Ankit Rajpoot; Nitish Rana; Atit Sheth; Shivam Mavi; Atharwa Taide
Oman	Pakistan U23	Sri Lanka U23	United Arab Emirates
Zeeshan Maqsood (c); Twinkal Bhandari; Aqib Ilyas; Bilal Khan; Nestor Dhamba; Fayyaz Butt; Jatinder Singh; Jay Odedra; Kaleemullah; Khawar Ali; Ajay Lalcheta; Moonamchery Michal; Mohammad Nadeem; Suraj Kumar; Wasim Ali	Mohammad Rizwan (c & wk); Sahibzada Farhan; Zeeshan Malik; Ali Imran; Hussain Talat; Saad Ali; Khushdil Shah; Saud Shakil; Ashiq Ali; Muhammad Asghar; Ghulam Mudassar; Sameen Gul; Musa Khan; Mohammad Ilyas; Suleman Shafqat	Charith Asalanka (c); Shammu Ashan; Kamindu Mendis; Avishka Fernando; Hasitha Boyagoda; Sandun Weerakkody; Asela Gunaratne; Nishan Madushka; Jeffrey Vandersay; Lasith Ambuldeniya; Nishan Peiris; Shehan Madushanka; Asitha Fernando; Jehan Daniel; Chamika Karunaratne	Rohan Mustafa (c); Muhammad Naveed; Ashfaq Ahmed; Fahad Nawaz; Rameez Shahzad; Shaiman Anwar; Muhammad Usman; Muhammad Boota; Ghulam Shabber (wk); Imran Haider; Tahir Latif; Ahmed Raza; Amir Hayat; Zahoor Khan; Qadeer Ahmed

== Group stage ==
=== Group A ===
Pos	Team	Pld	W	L	T	NR	Pts	NRR	
1	India U23	3	3	0	0	0	6	0.928	Advanced to knockouts
2	Sri Lanka U23	3	2	1	0	0	4	0.673	Advanced to knockouts
3	Afghanistan U23	3	1	2	0	0	2	0.228	
4	Oman	3	0	3	0	0	0	−1.820	

7 December 2018
09:45
Scorecard

Sri Lanka U23; 324/5 (50 overs)	v	Oman; 215/8 (50 overs)
Hasitha Boyagoda 80 (94); Jay Odedra 3/47 (10 overs)		Jatinder Singh 36 (59); Shammu Ashan 2/34 (10 overs)

Sri Lanka U23 won by 109 runs
R. Premadasa Stadium, Colombo

- Sri Lanka U23 won the toss and elected to bat.

7 December 2018
09:45
Scorecard

India U23; 281/8 (50 overs)	v	Afghanistan U23; 207 (44.4 overs)
Deepak Hooda 105 (103); Fazal Haque 3/54 (9 overs)		Karim Janat 58 (88); Jayant Yadav 3/37 (10 overs)

India U23 won by 74 runs
Colombo Cricket Club Ground, Colombo
Umpires: Ranmore Martinesz (SL) and Raveendra Wimalasiri (SL)

- Afghanistan U23 won the toss and elected to field.
- Prabhsimran Singh (India U23) made his List A debut.

8 December 2018
09:45
Scorecard

Afghanistan U23; 210 (47.5 overs)	v	Sri Lanka U23; 211/9 (49.2 overs)
Karim Janat 68 (99); Lasith Embuldeniya 3/35 (10 overs)		Kamindu Mendis 71 (98); Zia-ur-Rehman 3/33 (10 overs)

Sri Lanka U23 won by 1 wicket
Colombo Cricket Club Ground, Colombo
Umpires: Tanvir Ahmed (Ban) and Rashid Riaz (Pak)

- Afghanistan U23 won the toss and elected to bat.

8 December 2018
09:45
Scorecard

Oman; 203 (44.2 overs)	v	India U23; 206/4 (41.1 overs)
Aqib Ilyas 117 (122); Mayank Markande 4/41 (10 overs)		Ankush Bains 83 (98); Jay Odedra 3/38 (10 overs)

India U23 won by 6 wickets
R. Premadasa Stadium, Colombo
Umpires: Lyndon Hannibal (SL) and Raveendra Wimalasiri (SL)

- Oman won the toss and elected to bat.

10 December 2018
09:45
Scorecard

Sri Lanka U23; 260/7 (50 overs)	v	India U23; 261/6 (47.3 overs)
Avishka Fernando 80 (106); Shivam Mavi 3/62 (10 overs)		Himmat Singh 126* (140); Kamindu Mendis 3/51 (9 overs)

India U23 won by 4 wickets
R. Premadasa Stadium, Colombo
Umpires: Rashid Riaz (Pak) and Bismillah Jan Shinwari (Afg)

- Sri Lanka U23 won the toss and elected to bat.

10 December 2018
09:45
Scorecard

Afghanistan U23; 252 (49.1 overs)	v	Oman; 140 (39.5 overs)
Najibullah Zadran 83 (67); Kaleemullah 3/39 (9.1 overs)		Moonamchery Michal 54 (71); Karim Janat 2/9 (4 overs)

Afghanistan U23 won by 112 runs
Colombo Cricket Club Ground, Colombo
Umpires: Lyndon Hannibal (SL) and Ranmore Martinesz (SL)

- Afghanistan U23 won the toss and elected to bat.

=== Group B ===
Pos	Team	Pld	W	L	T	NR	Pts	NRR	
1	Pakistan U23	3	2	1	0	0	4	1.389	Advanced to knockouts
2	Bangladesh U23	3	2	1	0	0	4	0.100	Advanced to knockouts
3	United Arab Emirates	3	1	1	0	1	3	0.449	
4	Hong Kong	3	0	2	0	1	1	−2.530	

6 December 2018
09:30
Scorecard

Pakistan U23; 366/3 (50 overs)	v	Hong Kong; 141 (34 overs)
Sahibzada Farhan 130 (125); Aizaz Khan 2/92 (9 overs)		Shahid Wasif 59 (81); Mohammad Ilyas 5/35 (7 overs)

Pakistan U23 won by 225 runs
National Stadium, Karachi
Umpires: Sarika Prasad (Sin) and Izatullah Safi (Afg)
Player of the match: Mohammad Ilyas (Pakistan U23)

- Hong Kong won the toss and elected to field.

6 December 2018
09:30
Scorecard

United Arab Emirates; 267 (49.4 overs)	v	Bangladesh U23; 170 (36.5 overs)
Ghulam Shabber 52 (57); Shoriful Islam 4/55 (10 overs)		Mizanur Rahman 43 (62); Imran Haider 4/35 (7 overs)

United Arab Emirates won by 97 runs
Southend Club Cricket Stadium, Karachi
Umpires: Tariq Rasheed (Pak) and Ahmed Shahab (Pak)

- United Arab Emirates won the toss and elected to bat.

7 December 2018
09:30
Scorecard

United Arab Emirates; 233/9 (50 overs)	v	Pakistan U23; 235/1 (39 overs)
Ashfaq Ahmed 69 (89); Ashiq Ali 3/34 (10 overs)		Hussain Talat 116* (109); Ahmed Raza 1/44 (9 overs)

Pakistan U23 won by 9 wickets
National Stadium, Karachi
Umpires: Sarika Prasad (Sin) and Izatullah Safi (Afg)

- Pakistan U23 won the toss and elected to field.

7 December 2018
09:30
Scorecard

Bangladesh U23; 286/8 (50 overs)	v	Hong Kong; 258/7 (50 overs)
Mosaddek Hossain 100 (86); Aizaz Khan 3/62 (9 overs)		Nizakat Khan 92 (95); Mosaddek Hossain 2/23 (4 overs)

Bangladesh U23 won by 28 runs
Southend Club Cricket Stadium, Karachi
Umpires: Riazuddin (Pak) and Mohammad Sajid (Pak)

- Bangladesh U23 won the toss and elected to bat.

9 December 2018
09:30
Scorecard

Bangladesh U23; 309/5 (50 overs)	v	Pakistan U23; 225 (46.5 overs)
Mosaddek Hossain 85* (74); Khushdil Shah 3/48 (9 overs)		Khushdil Shah 61 (58); Nayeem Hasan 3/36 (10 overs)

Bangladesh U23 won by 84 runs
National Stadium, Karachi
Umpires: Sarika Prasad (Sin) and Izatullah Safi (Afg)
Player of the match: Mosaddek Hossain (Bangladesh U23)

- Bangladesh U23 won the toss and elected to bat.
- Suleman Shafqat (Pakistan U23) made his List A debut.

9 December 2018
09:30
Scorecard

Hong Kong; 87/4 (31 overs)	v	United Arab Emirates
Babar Hayat 45* (86); Ahmed Raza 1/12 (7 overs)

No result
Southend Club Cricket Stadium, Karachi
Umpires: Riazuddin (Pak) and Ahmed Shahab (Pak)

- United Arab Emirates won the toss and elected to field.
- No further play was possible due to rain.

== Knockouts ==
=== Semi finals ===
1st Semi final
13 December 2018
09:45
Scorecard

Pakistan U23; 172 (44.4 overs)	v	India U23; 178/3 (27.3 overs)
Mohammad Rizwan 67 (95); Mayank Markande 4/34 (9.4 overs)		Nitish Rana 60* (60); Khushdil Shah 1/31 (5 overs)

India U23 won by 7 wickets
Colombo Cricket Club Ground, Colombo
Umpires: Ranmore Martinesz (SL) and Raveendra Wimalasiri (SL)

- India U23 won the toss and elected to field.

2nd Semi final
13 December 2018
09:45
Scorecard

Bangladesh U23; 237 (49.1 overs)	v	Sri Lanka U23; 241/6 (48.2 overs)
Mizanur Rahman 72 (95); Chamika Karunaratne 4/31 (8.1 overs)		Kamindu Mendis 91* (88); Shoriful Islam 2/50 (9.2 overs)

Sri Lanka U23 won by 4 wickets
R. Premadasa Stadium, Colombo
Umpires: Rashid Riaz (Pak) and Bismillah Jan Shinwari (Afg)

- Sri Lanka U23 won the toss and elected to field.

=== Final ===
15 December 2018
09:45
Scorecard

Sri Lanka U23; 270/7 (50 overs)	v	India U23; 267/9 (50 overs)
Kamindu Mendis 61 (55); Ankit Rajpoot 2/61 (10 overs)		Jayant Yadav 71 (85); Asela Gunaratne 3/38 (7 overs)

Sri Lanka U23 won by 3 runs
R. Premadasa Stadium, Colombo
Umpires: Tavir Ahmed (Ban) and Rashid Riaz (Pak)
Player of the match: Kamindu Mendis (Sri Lanka U23)

- Sri Lanka U23 won the toss and elected to bat.
