= List of Hong Kong ODI cricketers =

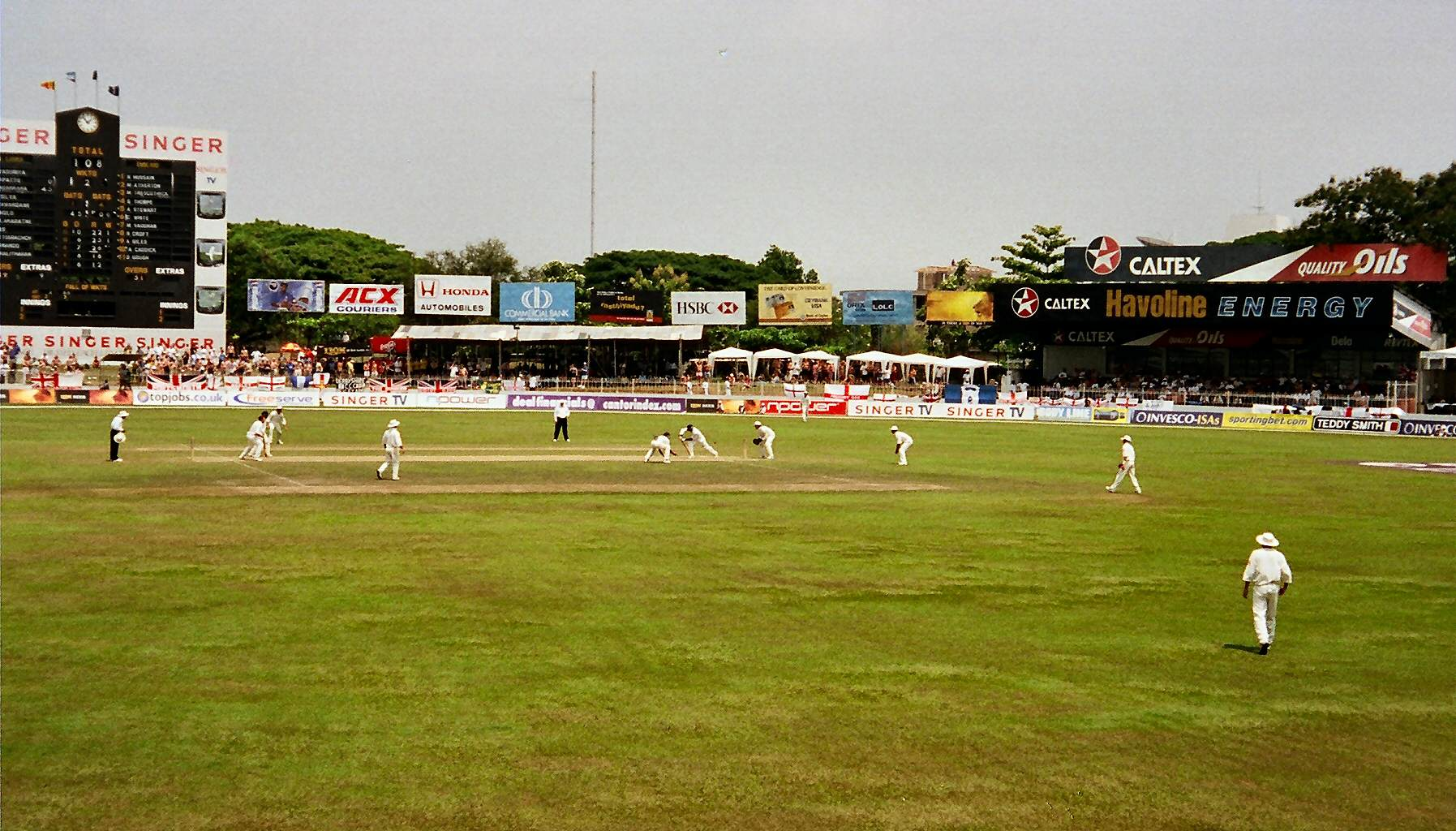
Hong Kong played its first ODI against Bangladesh at the Sinhalese Sports Club Ground (pictured), in the 2004 Asia Cup in Sri Lanka.

A One Day International (ODI) is an international cricket match between two representative teams, each having ODI status, as determined by the International Cricket Council (ICC). An ODI differs from Test matches in that the number of overs per side is limited, and that each team has only one innings. As of September 2018, 41 players have represented the Hong Kong national team in ODIs, since its debut in 2004. Many of these players are of South Asian origin, a demographic which comprises only a small fraction of the overall population of Hong Kong.

Hong Kong gained ODI status in its own right following the 2014 World Cup Qualifier, but had previously been accorded ODI status twice on a temporary basis, when it participated in the Asia Cup. (Note: The Asian Cricket Council allowed the participation of its two leading Associate Members (Hong Kong and the United Arab Emirates) of the International Cricket Council (ICC) to take part in the 2004 and 2008 Asia Cup alongside its four Test playing members. The Associate Members were given temporary One Day International (ODI) status for both tournaments, a status the Test playing nations hold permanently. Affording such status meant the matches were played as official ODIs under ICC conditions.) The team's first ODI came against Bangladesh in the 2004 Asia Cup, with the team then playing one further match in that competition, against Pakistan, losing both matches by big margins. At the 2008 Asia Cup, Hong Kong again played two matches, against Pakistan and India, and lost both matches heavily. After gaining full ODI status in 2014, the team's first matches in that format came in the 2014 ACC Premier League tournament, against Afghanistan and the United Arab Emirates (UAE). Hong Kong did not win an ODI until its tenth match, in November 2015, when it defeated the UAE by 89 runs as part of the World Cricket League Championship.

Hong Kong lost their ODI status in March 2018 after finishing 10th and last in the 2018 Cricket World Cup Qualifier. They did, however, play two further ODI matches at the 2018 Asia Cup in September 2018 after winning the 2018 Asia Cup Qualifier, as the ICC announced that all matches played at the finals would have ODI status. This list includes all players who have played at least one ODI match and is initially arranged in the order of debut appearance. Where more than one player won their first cap in the same match, those players are initially listed alphabetically at the time of debut.

== Key ==
General

- ‡ – Captain
- † – Wicket-keeper
- First – Year of debut
- Last – Year of latest game
- Mat – Number of matches played

Batting

- Runs – Runs scored in career
- HS – Highest score
- Avg – Runs scored per dismissal
- * – Batsman remained not out
- 100 – Number of centuries scored
- 50 – Number of half centuries scored

Bowling

- Balls – Balls bowled in career
- Wkt – Wickets taken in career
- BBI – Best bowling in an innings
- Ave – Average runs per wicket

Fielding

- Ca – Catches taken
- St – Stumpings affected

== List of players ==
Last updated 18 September 2018.

Hong Kong ODI cricketers
General					Batting					Bowling				Fielding		Ref
No.	Name	First	Last	Mat	Runs	HS	Avg	50	100	Balls	Wkt	BBI	Ave	Ca	St	Ref
1	Afzaal Haider	2004	2008	4	22	22	7.33	0	0	180	4	1/31	56.75	1	0	
2	Manoj Cheruparambil	2004	2004	2	30	30	15.00	0	0	–	–	–	–	0	0	
3	Alexander French	2004	2004	2	24	14	12.00	0	0	72	1	1/51	67.00	2	0	
4	Ilyas Gull	2004	2004	2	17	16	8.50	0	0	114	4	3/46	28.25	0	0	
5	Khalid Khan	2004	2004	2	5	3	2.50	0	0	108	3	2/62	31.00	0	0	
6	Sher Lama	2004	2004	1	16	16*	–	0	0	–	–	–	–	0	0	
7	Roy Lamsam	2004	2008	2	24	16	12.00	0	0	36	0	–	–	1	0	
8	Najeeb Amar	2004	2008	4	38	21	12.66	0	0	240	3	2/40	57.33	1	0	
9	Rahul Sharma ‡	2004	2004	2	11	10	5.50	0	0	–	–	–	–	1	0	
10	Tim Smart †	2004	2004	2	34	25	17.00	0	0	–	–	–	–	3	0	
11	Tabarak Dar ‡	2004	2008	4	101	36	25.25	0	0	–	–	–	–	0	0	
12	Nadeem Ahmed	2004	2018	25	67	14	5.58	0	0	1327	38	4/26	24.52	12	0	
13	Nasir Hameed †	2004	2004	1	0	0	0.00	0	0	–	–	–	–	0	0	
14	Jamie Atkinson ‡†	2008	2017	9	250	59	27.77	1	0	–	–	–	–	10	6	
15	Hussain Butt	2008	2008	2	8	4	4.00	0	0	–	–	–	–	1	0	
16	Irfan Ahmed	2008	2014	6	99	37	16.50	0	0	290	8	3/51	37.37	2	0	
17	Courtney Kruger	2008	2008	2	3	3	1.50	0	0	–	–	–	–	0	0	
18	Munir Dar	2008	2008	2	18	9	9.00	0	0	108	0	–	–	0	0	
19	Skhawat Ali	2008	2014	4	46	28	11.50	0	0	48	0	–	–	0	0	
20	Zain Abbas	2008	2008	1	26	26*	–	0	0	36	1	1/56	56.00	0	0	
21	Ankur Vasishta	2014	2014	4	36	18	12.00	0	0	–	–	–	–	1	0	
22	Babar Hayat ‡	2014	2018	22	784	89	39.20	8	0	6	0	–	–	11	0	
23	Ehsan Nawaz	2014	2018	12	30	11	5.00	0	0	513	16	4/47	28.62	2	0	
24	Haseeb Amjad	2014	2016	7	112	42	22.40	0	0	342	11	3/49	26.18	4	0	
25	Nizakat Khan	2014	2018	20	675	94	33.75	3	0	145	4	1/11	29.75	9	0	
26	Tanwir Afzal ‡	2014	2018	20	292	73	18.25	1	0	852	19	3/20	31.63	3	0	
27	Waqas Barkat	2014	2018	10	102	27	12.75	0	0	90	0	–	–	3	0	
28	Aizaz Khan	2014	2018	19	260	44	20.00	0	0	728	16	2/26	42.50	3	0	
29	Anshuman Rath ‡	2014	2018	18	828	143*	51.75	7	1	337	14	3/22	11.92	5	0	
30	Kinchit Shah	2014	2018	10	136	34*	15.11	0	0	110	7	4/10	11.28	1	0	
31	Christopher Carter †	2015	2018	11	114	43	12.66	0	0	–	–	–	–	10	2	
32	Mark Chapman^{1}	2015	2015	2	151	124*	151.00	0	1	–	–	–	–	1	0	
33	Waqas Khan	2015	2017	8	67	35*	16.75	0	0	–	–	–	–	0	0	
34	Ishtiaq Muhammad	2016	2016	1	0	0*	–	0	0	18	0	–	–	0	0	
35	Ehsan Khan	2016	2018	15	102	27*	11.33	0	0	807	29	4/33	20.48	3	0	
36	Shahid Wasif	2016	2018	10	81	45	11.57	0	0	–	–	–	–	2	0	
37	Tanveer Ahmed	2016	2018	6	4	2*	–	0	0	229	5	2/49	41.60	3	0	
38	Kyle Christie	2016	2016	1	0	0	0.00	0	0	6	0	–	–	0	0	
39	Cameron McAuslan	2017	2017	2	35	27	17.50	0	0	–	–	–	–	0	0	
40	Scott McKechnie †	2017	2018	8	108	29	15.42	0	0	–	–	–	–	8	1	
41	Simandeep Singh	2018	2018	1	0	0	0.00	0	0	–	–	–	–	0	0	

Notes:

- ^{1} Mark Chapman also played ODI cricket for New Zealand. Only his records for Hong Kong are given above.

== See also ==
- One Day International
- Hong Kong national cricket team
- List of Hong Kong Twenty20 International cricketers
