= Roy Lamsam =

Hong Kong cricketer (born 1980)

Personal information
- Full name: John Patrick Roy Lamsam
- Born: 15 May 1980 (age 46); Hong Kong
- Batting: Right-handed
- Bowling: Right-arm medium

International information
- National side: Hong Kong
- ODI debut (cap 7): 16 July 2004 v Bangladesh
- Last ODI: 25 June 2008 v India

Career statistics
Competition	ODI	LA	ICC T
Matches	2	2	4
Runs scored	24	24	15
Batting average	12.00	12.00	5.00
100s/50s	0/0	0/0	0/0
Top score	16	16	8
Balls bowled	36	36	?
Wickets	0	0	0
Bowling average	–	–	–
5 wickets in innings	–	–	–
10 wickets in match	–	–	–
Best bowling	–	–	–
Catches/stumpings	1/–	1/–	2/–
- Source: CricketArchive, 22 January 2011

John Patrick Roy Lamsam (born 15 May 1980) is a Hong Kong cricketer who has played 8 One Day Internationals and four ICC Trophy matches between 1997 and 2008. He is a specialist batsman who has batted between five and eight in the batting order for Hong Kong, scoring 15 ICC Trophy runs and 24 One Day International runs. In his debut match in the ICC Trophy, he was the seventh-choice bowler for Hong Kong, bowling the final over against Canada. However, he first bowled two wides (one of which was run for three), and then was injured. Because of the runs off wides counting against the bowler, but the wide not counting as a ball bowled, Lamsam ended with no balls bowled - and four runs conceded. As that was his only bowling in the ICC Trophy, this is still his career record.

Lamsam was selected to play for Hong Kong in the 2004 Asia Cup, scoring eight runs without taking a wicket against Bangladesh. He played just one more ODI, against India at the 2008 Asia Cup, scoring 16 runs before being run out by MS Dhoni.

He is the great-grandson of Robert Kotewall and brother of former swimmer Robyn Lamsam.
