= Ilyas Gull =

Hong Kong cricketer and team captain

Personal information
- Full name: Ilyas Gull
- Born: 1 January 1968 (age 58); Rawalpindi, Pakistan
- Batting: Right-handed
- Bowling: Right-arm off-break
- Role: Bowler

International information
- National side: Hong Kong
- ODI debut (cap 4): 16 July 2004 v Bangladesh
- Last ODI: 18 July 2004 v Pakistan

Career statistics
Competition	ODI	FC	LA
Matches	2	2	2
Runs scored	17	65	17
Batting average	8.50	65.00	8.50
100s/50s	0/0	0/0	0/0
Top score	16	33*	16
Balls bowled	114	114	114
Wickets	4	6	4
Bowling average	28.25	9.33	28.25
5 wickets in innings	0	1	0
10 wickets in match	0	0	0
Best bowling	3/46	5/16	3/46
Catches/stumpings	0/–	1/–	0/–
- Source: CricketArchive, 29 September 2009

Ilyas Gull (born 1 January 1968) is a Pakistani-born Hong Kong former cricketer. He was named captain of the Hong Kong cricket team for the 2007 ICC World Cricket League Division Three tournament, when Tim Smart resigned the captaincy.

Gull was born on 1 January 1968, in Rawalpindi, Pakistan.

His best One Day International bowling performance, 3–46, came on his ODI debut against Bangladesh at Colombo in 2004; as of 2007, he remains the only Hong Kong player to take three wickets in an ODI. In first-class cricket, he took 5-16 for Hong Kong against the UAE at Sharjah in the 2005 ICC Intercontinental Cup.
