= Mohammad Fariduddin =

Bangladeshi cricketer (born 1985)

Fariduddin
Personal information
- Full name: Mohammad Fariduddin
- Born: 7 May 1985 (age 41); Khulna, Bangladesh
- Batting: Right-handed
- Bowling: Right-arm offbreak
- Role: Batsman, Bowler

Mohammad Fariduddin (born 7 May 1985 in Khulna), generally known just as Fariduddin, is a Bangladeshi first-class and List A cricketer who made his debut for Khulna Division in the 2006–07 season. He is a right-handed batsman and a right-arm off break bowler. He is sometimes being referred to by his nickname "Masud". Fariduddin last played at the highest level in the 2014–15 season when he was representing Barisal Division and Kala Bagan Krira Chakra.
