= Shadeep Silva =

Sri Lankan cricketer (born 1978)

Personal information
- Full name: Elle Hennadige Shadeep Nadeeja Silva
- Born: 18 August 1978 (age 48); Galle, Sri Lanka
- Batting: Left-handed
- Bowling: Left-arm orthodox spin
- Role: Bowler

International information
- National side: United Arab Emirates
- Only ODI (cap 36): 24 June 2008 v Bangladesh

Domestic team information
- Years: Team
- 2000–2001: Sebastianites Cricket and Athletic Club

Career statistics
Competition	ODI	FC	LA
Matches	1	11	11
Runs scored	7	152	17
Batting average	7.00	10.13	8.50
100s/50s	0/0	0/0	0/0
Top score	7	43	7
Balls bowled	42	1,061	397
Wickets	0	16	12
Bowling average	–	33.31	28.00
5 wickets in innings	–	0	0
10 wickets in match	–	0	0
Best bowling	–	3/53	2/13
Catches/stumpings	0/–	1/–	1/–
- Source: CricketArchive, 3 January 2009

Elle Hennadige Shadeep Nadeeja Silva (born 18 August 1978), usually known as Shadeep Silva, is a Sri Lankan-born cricketer who played for the United Arab Emirates national cricket team. A left-handed batsman and left-arm orthodox spin bowler, he played a single One Day International (ODI) for the United Arab Emirates national cricket team, in 2008. Earlier in his career he played first-class and List A cricket for Sebastianites Cricket and Athletic Club in his native Sri Lanka.

== Biography ==
Born in Galle in 1978, Shadeep Silva's cricket career began with Sebastianites Cricket and Athletic Club. He played three List A matches for them in 2000 and one first-class match in February 2001. He also played four matches for their under-23 side.

He began playing for the UAE in 2006, first playing for them in the 2006 ACC Trophy in Kuala Lumpur. Later in the year he played ACC Premier League matches against Nepal and Hong Kong in addition to an ICC Intercontinental Cup match against Namibia in what was his second first-class match almost six years after his first. He also played against Ireland in the 2006/07 tournament.

In 2007, he toured Scotland and Canada with the UAE. He played a one-day match against a Scotland XI and an Intercontinental Cup match against Scotland on the Scottish leg of the tour, and an Intercontinental Cup match against Canada and one-day matches against a Canadian Invitation XI and Ontario on the Canadian leg.

Later in the year he played in the ACC Twenty20 Cup in Kuwait and returned to List A cricket when he played in Division Two of the World Cricket League in Namibia. He played an Intercontinental Cup match against Bermuda between the two tournaments.

He played for an Abu Dhabi XI against Ireland in early 2008, making his ODI debut later in the year against Bangladesh in the 2008 Asia Cup. He most recently represented his adopted country in the 2008 ACC Trophy Elite tournament in Kuala Lumpur.

Shadeep Silva is a Coach at Desert Cubs Cricket Academy which is based in Sharjah and Dubai.
