= Jitendra Redkar =

India-born Omani cricketer (born 1967)

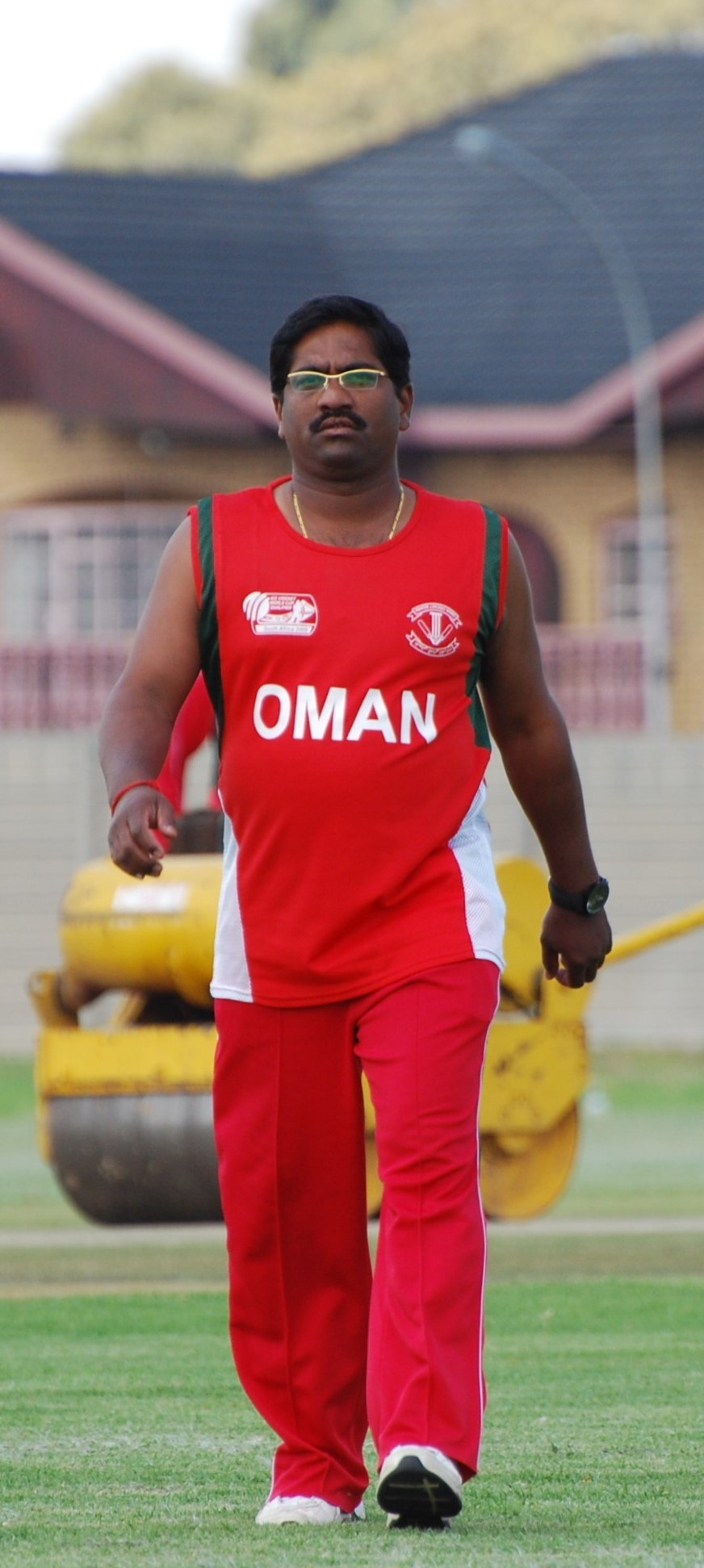
Jitendra Vinayak Redkar

Jitendra Vinayak Redkar, born 17 August 1967, is an Indian-born cricketer who played for the Oman national cricket team and was the former captain of Oman national cricket team, instrumental in Oman winning several ICC / ACC division tournaments. He also served as Technical Advisor cum Coach of Oman national team from 2007 to 2009. An accomplished wicket keeper and right-handed opening batsman played domestic cricket in Gujarat, Mumbai and later on in the Sultanate of Oman.

== Life and career ==
In his early days, Redkar represented Mumbai's one of the most iconic cricket club – Parsee Gymkhana and caught the eye of one of the most respected cricket personalities of Mumbai, Late Shri Vasu Paranjape sir, who persuaded him to move to Oman to play in the top league cricket there. After series of impressive performances in the domestic tournaments in Oman, Redkar was selected to represent and subsequently lead the national cricket team of Oman. He retired from cricket in 2006 and was appointed Coach cum Technical Director of Oman, where he played a key role in streamlining cricket operations and overseeing cricket infrastructure development in Oman. He organized several training camps for National cricket team of Oman, liaising with ICC and ACC representatives, ensuring smooth functioning of cricket in Oman. For his contribution to Oman Cricket, Redkar was included in the "Hall of Fame" plaque placed at the Oman Cricket academy, as a part of celebrations to mark the historical milestone and achievement of Oman hosting ICC T20 World Cup in Oct 2021 in the newly constructed Oman Cricket Academy.

== Cricketing career ==
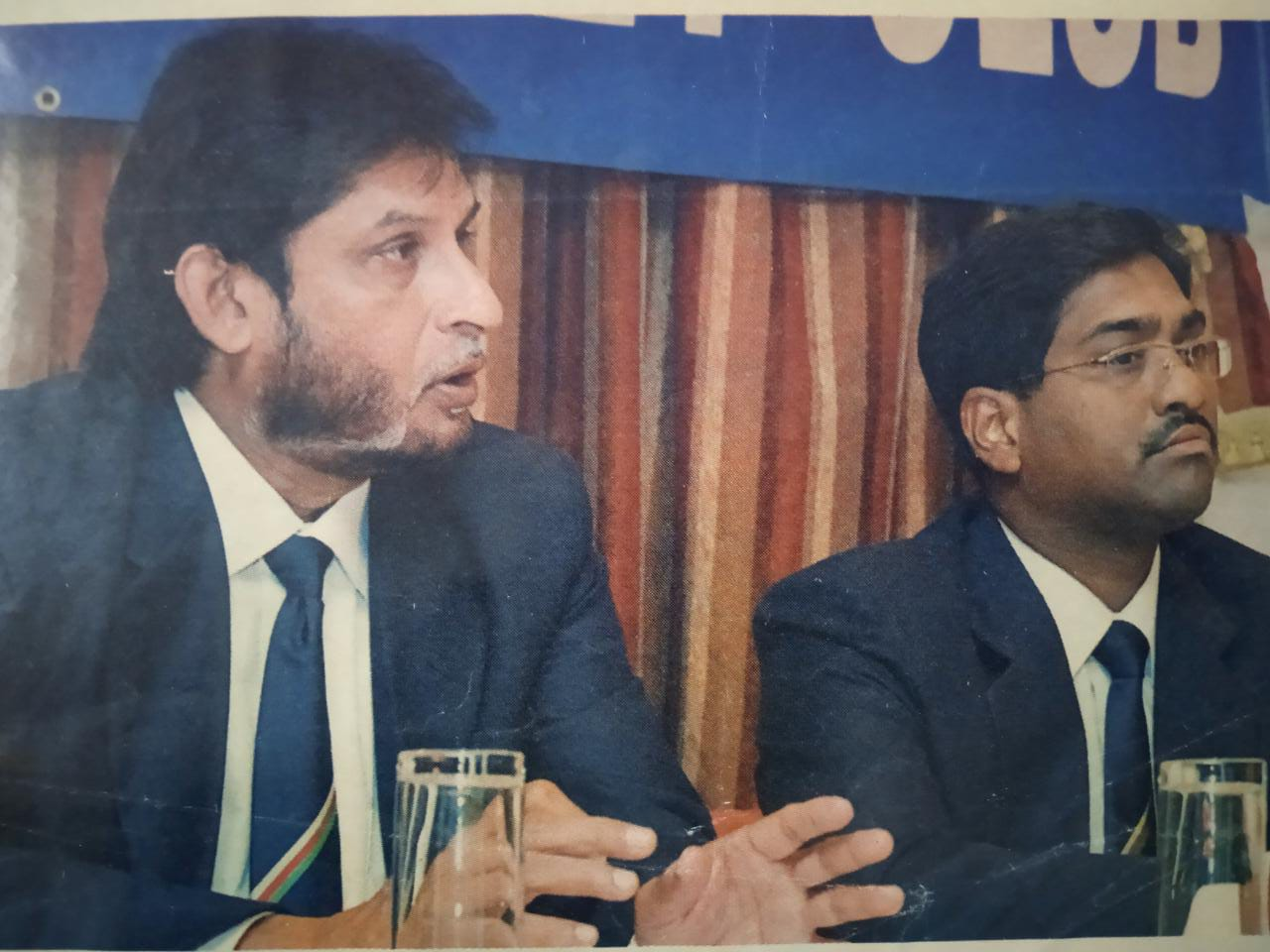
With Shri Sandeep Patil Sir (Coach) at Press conference in Muscat for Asian Cricket Council, Kualalumpur, Malaysia - 2006.

Notable achievements as a Coach/Technical advisor:

- 2007 – Joint Winners with Afghanistan, Asian Cricket Council (ACC) T20 cricket tournament in Kuwait.
- 2007 – Runners-up, International Cricket Council (ICC) division II World Cup league in Namibia.
- 2009 – Winners, ACC Challenger tournament in Thailand.
- 2009 – ICC World Cup qualifier in South Africa.

Notable achievements as a Player/Captain:

- 2002 to 2006 – Represented Oman national team at ICC and ACC cricket tournaments held in Singapore, Malaysia, UAE, South Africa, Ireland, Sri Lanka, Thailand, Namibia, Kuwait etc.
- Captained Oman National Team under coach Sandeep Patil (former India player and chief selector)
- 1991 to 2006 – Represented Muscat cricket team in Oman's Division ‘A’ domestic cricket tournaments, being captain of the team from 2000 to 2006.
- 1984 to 1990 – Represented various clubs associated with Mumbai Cricket Association, most notably Parsee Gymkhana in Mumbai's ‘A’ division cricket tournaments. (Kanga League, Talyarkhan Trophy, Police shield, Talim Shield and Times Shield for Oriental Insurance Company.
- 1992 – Selected to play (India XI) in an invitational match in Muscat, between India XI led by Kapil Dev and Pakistan XI led by Javed Miandad, organized by Oman Cricket. He was also a key member of the Match organizing team.
