= Dhirendra Chand =

Nepalese cricketer

Personal information
- Born: Nepal
- Role: Bowler

Domestic team information
- Years: Team
- 2004–2008: Baitadi

Career statistics
Competition	First-class
Matches	2
Runs scored	0
Batting average	–
100s/50s	0/0
Top score	0
Balls bowled	201
Wickets	7
Bowling average	13.00
5 wickets in innings	0
10 wickets in match	0
Best bowling	2/12
Catches/stumpings	1/–
- Source: Cricinfo, 8 March 2008

Dhirendra Chand is a Nepalese cricketer who has played for the Nepal national cricket team since 2005.

He represents the Region no. 6 Baitadi of the National League.

== Biography ==
Born in Nepal, Dhirendra Chand made his début for Nepal in 2005 when he played in the repêchage tournament of the 2005 ICC Trophy, in which Nepal finished third after beating Qatar in a play-off. He also played ACC Fast Track Nations matches against Singapore, Malaysia, the UAE and Hong Kong that year. The games against the UAE and Hong Kong also counted towards the 2005 ICC Intercontinental Cup and are his only first-class matches to date.

He most recently represented his country in August 2006 when he toured Pakistan with Nepal and played in the ACC Trophy in Malaysia.
