= Ehsan Khan (cricketer) =

Hong Kong cricketer

Personal information
- Born: 27 December 1984 (age 41); Lahore, Pakistan
- Batting: Right-handed
- Bowling: Right-arm off break
- Role: Bowler

International information
- National side: Hong Kong (2016–present)
- ODI debut (cap 35): 8 September 2016 v Scotland
- Last ODI: 18 September 2018 v India
- T20I debut (cap 22): 5 September 2016 v Ireland
- Last T20I: 13 November 2025 v Qatar

Career statistics
Competition	ODI	T20I	FC	LA
Matches	15	94	4	55
Runs scored	102	385	80	459
Batting average	11.33	14.80	13.33	15.82
100s/50s	0/0	0/0	0/0	0/0
Top score	27*	42*	30	44*
Balls bowled	807	2,003	671	2,721
Wickets	29	127	11	93
Bowling average	20.48	16.45	35.45	21.39
5 wickets in innings	0	0	1	1
10 wickets in match	0	0	0	0
Best bowling	4/33	4/5	5/13	5/17
Catches/stumpings	3/–	23/–	4/–	15/–
- Source: Cricinfo, 31 July 2025

Ehsan Khan (born 27 December 1984) is a Pakistani-born Hong Kong cricketer, who has played for the Hong Kong national cricket team. He made his first-class cricket debut against Ireland in the 2015–17 ICC Intercontinental Cup on 30 August 2016. He made his Twenty20 International (T20I) debut against Ireland on 5 September 2016. He made his One Day International (ODI) debut against Scotland on 8 September 2016, taking a wicket with his very first delivery.

On 8 March 2018, during the 2018 Cricket World Cup Qualifier match against Afghanistan at Bulawayo Athletic Club, Bulawayo, Khan took 4 wickets for 33 runs, to help his team win by 30 runs, under the Duckworth–Lewis method, and was declared the player of the match. It was Hong Kong's first win against an ICC Full Member side in an ODI match. Following the conclusion of the Cricket World Cup Qualifier tournament, the International Cricket Council (ICC) named Khan as the rising star of Hong Kong's squad.

Khan was a member of Hong Kong's squad for the 2018 Asia Cup Qualifier tournament. Hong Kong won the qualifier tournament, and he was then named in Hong Kong's squad for the 2018 Asia Cup.

In December 2018, he was named in Hong Kong's team for the 2018 ACC Emerging Teams Asia Cup. In April 2019, he was named in Hong Kong's squad for the 2019 ICC World Cricket League Division Two tournament in Namibia. He was named as one of the six players to watch during the tournament.

In September 2019, he was named in Hong Kong's squad for the 2019 ICC T20 World Cup Qualifier tournament in the United Arab Emirates. In November 2019, he was named in Hong Kong's squad for the 2019 ACC Emerging Teams Asia Cup in Bangladesh, and for the Cricket World Cup Challenge League B tournament in Oman. In May 2022, he was named in Hong Kong's side for the 2022 Uganda Cricket World Cup Challenge League B tournament.
