= Judhajit Mukherjee =

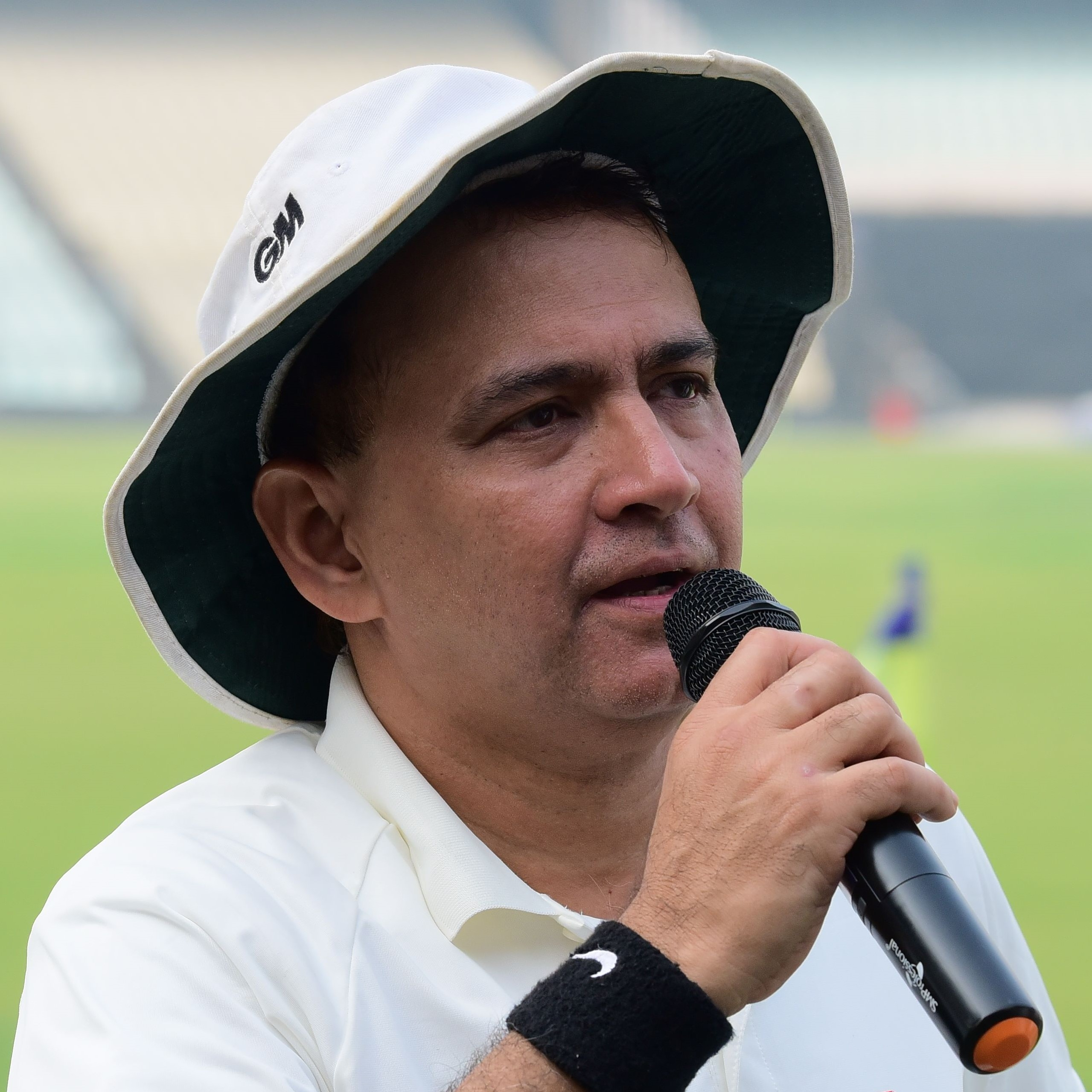
photo of Judhajit Mukherjee

Judhajit Mukherjee (born 8 May 1971 in Calcutta) is an Indian cricketer and BCCI Level 2 qualified coach. He also represented club and state teams in Asia-Pacific region during work related stay. He is a right-handed batsman and right-arm medium pacer who played for the Bengal in Vijay Hazare Trophy. He also represented Bengal and East Zone in Vijay Merchant Trophy.

Mukherjee played with Sourav Ganguly, Saradindu Mukherjee, Utpal Chatterjee, Pranab Roy, Devang Gandhi and other international cricketers across various levels within and outside the state. He received national scholarships for being a top ranker in his school-leaving exams. While graduating as Bachelor of Engineering in Electronics/Telecom Engineering from Jadavpur University he was awarded the Best All-Round Graduate medal. He also captained the university's cricket team and various other teams during his cricket career. He won the gold medal for the highest scorer in the Cricket Association of Bengal-organized N.C. Chatterjee Tournament.

He represented the 'India in UK' team at the Eden Gardens at the HSBC Indo British heritage Cup. He is currently a cricket coach who mentors young talents and also is a regular face at various events on television and other media platforms. By profession he is working in the Information Technology sector and is also entrusted with honorary roles to guide the students in a number of technology and management institutions.
