= Buddhika =

Buddhika is a Sinhalese name. It may refer to:

- Buddhika Pathirana, Sri Lankan politician;
- Buddhika Mendis, Sri Lankan cricketer;
- Buddhika Kurukularatne, Sri Lankan politician;
- Charitha Buddhika, Sri Lankan cricketer.
