= 2008 Asia Cup =

Cricket tournament in Pakistan

2008 Star Cricket Asia Cup
- Dates: 24 June – 6 July 2008
- Administrator: Asian Cricket Council
- Cricket format: One Day International
- Tournament format(s): Round-robin and Knockout
- Host: Pakistan
- Champions: Sri Lanka (4th title)
- Runners-up: India
- Participants: 6
- Matches: 13
- Player of the series: (Sri Lanka) Ajantha Mendis
- Most runs: (Sri Lanka) Sanath Jayasuriya (378)
- Most wickets: (Sri Lanka) Ajantha Mendis (17)

The 2008 Asia Cup (also called Star Cricket Asia Cup) was a One Day International (ODI) cricket tournament, held in Pakistan from 24 June to 6 July 2008, at two venues. The six teams which took part in the tournament were India, Pakistan, Sri Lanka, Bangladesh and Asian associate nations UAE and Hong Kong. This was the first Asia Cup hosted by Pakistan; previously political tensions between India and Pakistan did not permit Pakistan to host the event in 1993. It was broadcast in India by Star Cricket and ESPN and in Pakistan by Geo Super. Sri Lanka won the tournament after beating India by 100 runs in the final.

Due to the 2008 Mumbai attacks and security reasons, this is the last time India has played a tournament in Pakistan.

== Format ==
Originally, the ninth version of the Cup was supposed to take place in 2006, however packed international cricket schedules did not allow for the tournament to be held.

Group A consisted of Bangladesh, Sri Lanka and the United Arab Emirates.

Group B consisted of India, Pakistan and Hong Kong.

The two groups first had a separate round-robin competition. The top two teams from each group advanced to the Super Fours. There was again a round-robin competition between the teams in the Super Four, the first two from which advanced to the final.

== Venues ==
13 matches were played in 2008 Asia Cup at National Stadium, Karachi and Gaddafi Stadium, Lahore.

| Karachi | Lahore |
|---|---|
| National Stadium | Gaddafi Stadium |
| Capacity: 34,000 | Capacity: 27,000 |
| Matches: 10 | Matches: 3 |
2008 Asia Cup is located in Pakistan

== Squads ==
| Bangladesh | Hong Kong | India | Pakistan | Sri Lanka | United Arab Emirates |
|---|---|---|---|---|---|
| Mohammad Ashraful (c); Alok Kapali; Mashrafe Mortaza; Abdur Razzak; Dolar Mahmud; Farhad Reza; Mahmudullah; Mehrab Hossain Jnr; Mosharraf Hossain; Mushfiqur Rahim (wk); Nazimuddin; Raqibul Hasan; Shahadat Hossain; Shahriar Nafees; Tamim Iqbal | Tabarak Dar (c); Afzaal Haider; Ashish Gadhia; Jamie Atkinson (wk); Toby Brown; Hussain Butt; Irfan Ahmed; Courtney Kruger; Roy Lamsam; Munir Dar; Nadeem Ahmed; Najeeb Amar; Skhawat Ali; Waqas Barkat; Zain Abbas | MS Dhoni (c & wk); Yuvraj Singh (vc); Robin Uthappa; Gautam Gambhir; Virender Sehwag; Rohit Sharma; Suresh Raina; Yusuf Pathan; Irfan Pathan; Ishant Sharma; Praveen Kumar; R. P. Singh; Piyush Chawla; Pragyan Ojha; Manpreet Gony; ~~S. Sreesanth~~ | Shoaib Malik (c); Misbah ul Haq (vc); Abdur Rauf; Fawad Alam; Iftikhar Anjum; Mansoor Amjad; Mohammad Yousuf; Nasir Jamshed; Saeed Ajmal; Salman Butt; Sarfraz Ahmed (wk); Shahid Afridi; Sohail Tanvir; Wahab Riaz; Younis Khan; Umar Gul | Mahela Jayawardene (c); Tillakaratne Dilshan; Dilhara Fernando; Sanath Jayasuriya; Chamara Kapugedera; Nuwan Kulasekara; Ajantha Mendis; Jehan Mubarak; Muttiah Muralitharan; Kumar Sangakkara (wk); Chamara Silva; Thilan Thushara; Mahela Udawatte; Chaminda Vaas; Kaushalya Weeraratne; Farveez Maharoof | Saqib Ali (c); Alawi Shukri; Aman Ali; Amjad Ali (wk); Amjad Javed; Arshad Ali; Indika Batuwitarachchi; Fahad Alhashmi; Nizel Fernandes; Khurram Khan; Mohammad Tauqir; Salman Farooq; Vikrant Shetty; Shadeep Silva; Zahid Shah |

== Group stage ==
=== Group A ===
| Pos | Team | Pld | W | L | T | NR | Pts | NRR |
|---|---|---|---|---|---|---|---|---|
| 1 | Sri Lanka | 2 | 2 | 0 | 0 | 0 | 4 | 2.730 |
| 2 | Bangladesh | 2 | 1 | 1 | 0 | 0 | 2 | −0.350 |
| 3 | United Arab Emirates | 2 | 0 | 2 | 0 | 0 | 0 | −2.380 |

Source: ESPNCricinfo

All times are in UTC+5 (PST)

24 June 2008
16:00 (D/N)
scorecard

| Bangladesh; 300/8 (50 overs) | v | United Arab Emirates; 204 (45.4 overs) |
| Mohammad Ashraful 109 (126); Zahid Shah 3/49 (10 overs) | | Khurram Khan 78 (81); Abdur Razzak 3/20 (10 overs) |

Bangladesh won by 96 runs
Gaddafi Stadium, Lahore
Umpires: Ian Gould (Eng) and Simon Taufel (Aus)
Player of the match: Mohammad Ashraful (Ban)

25 June 2008
16:00 (D/N)
scorecard

| Sri Lanka; 357/9 (50 overs) | v | Bangladesh; 226/7 (50 overs) |
| Kumar Sangakkara 101 (91); Abdur Razzak 3/55 (10 overs) | | Mushfiqur Rahim 44 (53); Muttiah Muralitharan 2/37 (10 overs) |

Sri Lanka won by 131 runs
Gaddafi Stadium, Lahore
Umpires: Ian Gould (Eng) and Simon Taufel (Aus)
Player of the match: Kumar Sangakkara (SL)

26 June 2008
16:00 (D/N)
scorecard

| Sri Lanka; 290/9 (50 overs) | v | United Arab Emirates; 148 (36.3 overs) |
| Mahela Udawatte 67 (74); Zahid Shah 3/49 (10 overs) | | Amjad Ali 77 (79); Ajantha Mendis 5/22 (6.3 overs) |

Sri Lanka won by 142 runs
Gaddafi Stadium, Lahore
Umpires: Ian Gould (Eng) and Simon Taufel (Aus)
Player of the match: Ajantha Mendis (SL)

=== Group B ===
| Pos | Team | Pld | W | L | T | NR | Pts | NRR |
|---|---|---|---|---|---|---|---|---|
| 1 | India | 2 | 2 | 0 | 0 | 0 | 4 | 3.154 |
| 2 | Pakistan | 2 | 1 | 1 | 0 | 0 | 2 | 1.161 |
| 3 | Hong Kong | 2 | 0 | 2 | 0 | 0 | 0 | −4.110 |

Source: ESPNCricinfo

All times are in UTC+5 (PST)

24 June 2008
16:00 (D/N)
scorecard

| Pakistan; 288/9 (50 overs) | v | Hong Kong; 133 (37.2 overs) |
| Younis Khan 67 (65); Nadeem Ahmed 4/51 (9 overs) | | Zain Abbas 26 (54); Iftikhar Anjum 2/18 (6 overs) |

Pakistan won by 155 runs
National Stadium, Karachi
Umpires: Tony Hill (NZ) and Brian Jerling (SA)
Player of the match: Sohail Tanvir (Pak)

25 June 2008
16:00 (D/N)
scorecard

| India; 374/4 (50 overs) | v | Hong Kong; 118 (36.5 overs) |
| MS Dhoni 109 (96); Najeeb Amar 2/40 (10 overs) | | Irfan Ahmed 25 (43); Piyush Chawla 4/23 (10 overs) |

India won by 256 runs
National Stadium, Karachi
Umpires: Tony Hill (NZ) and Brian Jerling (SA)
Player of the match: Suresh Raina (Ind)

- India won the toss and elected to bat.
- This was India's first cricket match to be played against Hong Kong.
- Suresh Raina (Ind) scored his first century in ODIs.

26 June 2008
16:00 (D/N)
scorecard

| Pakistan; 299/4 (50 overs) | v | India; 301/4 (42.1 overs) |
| Shoaib Malik 125 (119); R. P. Singh 1/44 (10 overs) | | Virender Sehwag 119 (95); Iftikhar Anjum 2/61 (9.4 overs) |

India won by 6 wickets
National Stadium, Karachi
Umpires: Tony Hill (NZ) and Brian Jerling (SA)
Player of the match: Suresh Raina (Ind)

== Super Fours ==
| Pos | Team | Pld | W | L | T | NR | PCO | Pts | NRR |
|---|---|---|---|---|---|---|---|---|---|
| 1 | Sri Lanka | 3 | 2 | 1 | 0 | 0 | 2 | 6 | 1.363 |
| 2 | India | 3 | 2 | 1 | 0 | 0 | 2 | 6 | 0.250 |
| 3 | Pakistan | 3 | 2 | 1 | 0 | 0 | 0 | 4 | 0.924 |
| 4 | Bangladesh | 3 | 0 | 3 | 0 | 0 | 0 | 0 | −2.665 |

Source: ESPNCricinfo

All times are in UTC+5 (PST)

28 June 2008
16:00 (D/N)
scorecard

| Bangladesh; 283/6 (50 overs) | v | India; 284/3 (43.2 overs) |
| Alok Kapali 115 (96); Irfan Pathan 2/43 (10 overs) | | Suresh Raina 116* (107); Shahadat Hossain 2/60 (9 overs) |

India won by 7 wickets
National Stadium, Karachi
Umpires: Brian Jerling (SA) and Simon Taufel (Aus)
Player of the match: Suresh Raina (Ind)

29 June 2008
16:00 (D/N)
scorecard

| Sri Lanka; 302/7 (50 overs) | v | Pakistan; 238/9 (50 overs) |
| Kumar Sangakkara 112 (110); Sohail Tanvir 5/48 (10 overs) | | Misbah-ul-Haq 76 (70); Ajantha Mendis 4/47 (10 overs) |

Sri Lanka won by 64 runs
National Stadium, Karachi
Umpires: Ian Gould (Eng) and Tony Hill (NZ)
Player of the match: Kumar Sangakkara (SL)

30 June 2008
16:00 (D/N)
scorecard

| Sri Lanka; 332/8 (50 overs) | v | Bangladesh; 174 (38.3 overs) |
| Sanath Jayasuriya 130 (88); Alok Kapali 2/40 (6 overs) | | Raqibul Hasan 52 (63); Muttiah Muralitharan 5/31 (10 overs) |

Sri Lanka won by 158 runs
National Stadium, Karachi
Umpires: Brian Jerling (SA) & Simon Taufel (Aus)
Player of the match: Sanath Jayasuriya (SL)

2 July 2008
16:00 (D/N)
scorecard

| India; 308/7 (50 overs) | v | Pakistan; 309/2 (45.3 overs) |
| MS Dhoni 76 (96); Iftikhar Anjum 3/51 (10 overs) | | Younis Khan 123* (117); Piyush Chawla 1/53 (8 overs) |

Pakistan won by 8 wickets
National Stadium, Karachi
Umpires: Ian Gould (Eng) and Tony Hill (NZ)
Player of the match: Younis Khan (Pak)

- Saeed Ajmal (Pak) made his ODI debut.
- Misbah-ul-Haq (Pak) stood as captain for the first time in ODIs.

3 July 2008
16:00 (D/N)
scorecard

| Sri Lanka; 308/8 (50 overs) | v | India; 310/4 (46.5 overs) |
| Chamara Kapugedera 75 (78); Ishant Sharma 2/55 (10 overs) | | Gautam Gambhir 68 (61); Muttiah Muralitharan 2/44 (10 overs) |

India won by 6 wickets
National Stadium, Karachi
Umpires: Brian Jerling (SA) and Simon Taufel (Aus)
Player of the match: MS Dhoni (Ind)

4 July 2008
16:00 (D/N)
scorecard

| Bangladesh; 115 (38.2 overs) | v | Pakistan; 116/0 (19.4 overs) |
| Tamim Iqbal 26 (41); Abdur Rauf 3/24 (8 overs) | | Salman Butt 56* (52) |

Pakistan won by 10 wickets
National Stadium, Karachi
Umpires: Ian Gould (Eng) and Tony Hill (NZ)
Player of the match: Abdur Rauf (Pak)

== Final ==
6 July 2008
16:00 (D/N)
scorecard

| Sri Lanka; 273 (49.5 overs) | v | India; 173 (39.3 overs) |
| Sanath Jayasuriya 125 (114); Ishant Sharma 3/52 (10 overs) | | Virender Sehwag 60 (36); Ajantha Mendis 6/13 (8 overs) |

Sri Lanka won by 100 runs
National Stadium, Karachi
Umpires: Tony Hill (NZ) and Simon Taufel (Aus)
Player of the match: Ajantha Mendis (SL)

- India won the toss and elected to field.

== Statistics ==
=== Most runs ===
| Player | Innings | NO | Runs | Average | SR | HS | 100 | 50 | 4s | 6s |
|---|---|---|---|---|---|---|---|---|---|---|
| (Sri Lanka) Sanath Jayasuriya | 5 | 0 | 378 | 75.60 | 126.00 | 130 | 2 | 2 | 44 | 16 |
| (India) Suresh Raina | 6 | 1 | 372 | 74.40 | 110.38 | 116* | 2 | 2 | 34 | 11 |
| (India) Virender Sehwag | 5 | 0 | 348 | 69.60 | 143.80 | 119 | 1 | 2 | 49 | 10 |
| (Sri Lanka) Kumar Sangakkara | 6 | 0 | 345 | 57.50 | 99.13 | 121 | 3 | 3 | 44 | 2 |
| (India) Mahendra Dhoni | 5 | 2 | 327 | 109.00 | 91.34 | 109* | 1 | 2 | 19 | 8 |
Updated: 7 October 2022

=== Most wickets ===
| Player | Innings | Wickets | Runs | Overs | BBI | Econ. | Ave. | 5WI |
|---|---|---|---|---|---|---|---|---|
| (Sri Lanka) Ajantha Mendis | 5 | 17 | 145 | 42.0 | 6/13 | 3.45 | 8.52 | 2 |
| (Sri Lanka) Muthiah Muralidaran | 5 | 11 | 184 | 48.0 | 5/31 | 3.83 | 16.72 | 1 |
| (Pakistan) Sohail Tanvir | 5 | 10 | 241 | 42.0 | 5/48 | 5.73 | 24.10 | 1 |
| (Pakistan) Iftikhar Anjum | 5 | 9 | 210 | 43.4 | 3/51 | 4.80 | 23.33 | 0 |
| (India) Rudra Singh | 5 | 7 | 239 | 43.0 | 3/67 | 5.55 | 34.14 | 0 |
| (Bangladesh) Abdur Razzak | 5 | 7 | 247 | 46.2 | 3/20 | 5.33 | 35.28 | 0 |
Updated: 7 October 2022
