= Tanveer Ahmed (cricketer) =

Hong Kong cricketer

Personal information
- Full name: Tanveer Ahmed
- Born: 18 September 1997 (age 29); Pakistan
- Batting: Right-handed
- Bowling: Right-arm medium-fast
- Role: Bowler
- Relatives: Ehsan Nawaz (brother)

International information
- National side: Hong Kong (2016–2019)
- ODI debut (cap 37): 8 September 2016 v Scotland
- Last ODI: 17 March 2018 v Papua New Guinea
- T20I debut (cap 20): 22 February 2016 v Afghanistan
- Last T20I: 18 January 2017 v Netherlands

Career statistics
Competition	ODI	T20I	FC	LA
Matches	6	5	2	14
Runs scored	4	7	2	8
Batting average	–	7.00	1.00	–
100s/50s	0/0	0/0	0/0	0/0
Top score	2*	7*	2	2*
Balls bowled	229	81	120	570
Wickets	5	3	3	12
Bowling average	41.60	38.66	23.33	47.58
5 wickets in innings	0	0	0	0
10 wickets in match	0	0	0	0
Best bowling	2/49	2/29	2/22	3/20
Catches/stumpings	3/–	1/–	0/–	6/–
- Source: CricketArchive, 28 September 2021

Tanveer Ahmed (born 18 September 1997) is a Hong Kong cricketer. He made his Twenty20 International debut against Afghanistan in the 2016 Asia Cup Qualifier on 22 February 2016. Before making his international debut, he was named in Hong Kong's squad for the 2016 ICC World Twenty20 tournament. He made his first-class cricket debut against Ireland in the 2015–17 ICC Intercontinental Cup on 30 August 2016. He made his One Day International (ODI) debut against Scotland on 8 September 2016.

In September 2018, he was named in Hong Kong's squad for the 2018 Asia Cup. In December 2018, he was named in Hong Kong's team for the 2018 ACC Emerging Teams Asia Cup. In April 2019, he was named in Hong Kong's squad for the 2019 ICC World Cricket League Division Two tournament in Namibia.

In September 2019, he was named in Hong Kong's squad for the 2019 ICC T20 World Cup Qualifier tournament in the United Arab Emirates. However, ahead of the 2019–20 Oman Pentangular Series, Ahmed and his brother Ehsan Nawaz, both withdrew themselves from selection consideration for Hong Kong and were released from their Cricket Hong Kong contracts.
