= Skhawat Ali =

Hong Kong cricketer (born 1985)

Personal information
- Full name: Skhawat Ali
- Born: 5 May 1985 (age 41); Hong Kong
- Batting: Right-handed
- Bowling: Right-arm medium-fast
- Role: Batsman

International information
- National side: Hong Kong
- ODI debut (cap 19): 24 June 2008 v Pakistan
- Last ODI: 25 June 2008 v India

Career statistics
Competition	ODI
Matches	2
Runs scored	8
Batting average	4.00
100s/50s	0/0
Top score	8
Balls bowled	48
Wickets	0
Bowling average	–
5 wickets in innings	–
10 wickets in match	–
Best bowling	–
Catches/stumpings	0/–
- Source: CricketArchive, 29 November 2008

Skhawat Ali (born 5 May 1985) is a cricketer who has played One Day Internationals (ODIs) for Hong Kong. He participated in 17th Incheon Asian Games 2014. He also participated in the May 2015 Intercontinental Cricket Cup in Namibia, representing Hong Kong National Cricket Team. He made his ODI debut for Hong Kong against Pakistan on June 24, 2008. He also played for JD Jaguars in the Hong Kong DTC T20 Blitz (2017) alongside Darren Sammy of the West Indies. He is also a full-time Physical Education teacher in Hong Kong. He is a certified cricket coach for ACC level 2. He is also certified sports coach in rugby, badminton, lacrosse and Pickleball.
