= Manoj Cheruparambil =

Indian-born Hong Kong cricketer (born 1979)

Personal information
- Full name: Manoj Cheruparambil
- Born: 24 October 1979 (age 47); Alleppey, India
- Batting: Right-handed
- Bowling: Right arm medium

International information
- National side: Hong Kong
- ODI debut (cap 2): 16 July 2004 v Bangladesh
- Last ODI: 18 July 2004 v Pakistan

Domestic team information
- Years: Team
- 2004–2005: Hong Kong

Career statistics
Competition	ODI	FC	LA
Matches	2	2	2
Runs scored	30	41	30
Batting average	15.00	10.25	15.00
100s/50s	0/0	0/0	0/0
Top score	30	26	30
Catches/stumpings	0/–	0/–	0/–
- Source: Cricinfo, 15 September 2009

Manoj Cheruparambil (born 24 October 1979) is an Indian-born Hong Kong cricketer. He played in two One Day Internationals for the Hong Kong cricket team in 2004, both in Colombo in Sri Lanka during the Asia Cup, the first against Bangladesh and the second against Pakistan. As of 1 March 2007, he has also played in two first-class and two List A cricket matches. He served as captain of Hong Kong in ICC World Cricket League matches and also as vice-captain. He also served as a wicket-keeper for Hong Kong national team.
