= Mahbubur Rahman (umpire) =

Bangladeshi cricket umpire (born 1957)

Personal information
- Full name: Mohammad Mahbubur Rahman
- Born: 6 January 1957 (age 69); Khulna, Bangladesh

Umpiring information
- Tests umpired: 1 (2002)
- ODIs umpired: 17 (2002–2006)
- Source: ESPNcricinfo, 10 July 2013

Mahbubur Rahman (born 6 January 1957) is a former Bangladeshi cricket umpire. He stood in one Test match, between Bangladesh and Pakistan, in 2002 and 17 One Day International matches from 2002 to 2006.

== See also ==
- List of Test cricket umpires
- List of One Day International cricket umpires
