= Afzaal Haider =

Pakistani-born Hong Kong cricketer (born 1971)

Personal information
- Full name: Mohammad Afzaal Haider
- Born: 12 December 1971 (age 54); Lahore, Punjab, Pakistan
- Nickname: Afi, Coach
- Batting: Right-handed
- Bowling: Right-arm medium
- Role: Bowler

International information
- National side: Hong Kong
- ODI debut (cap 1): 16 July 2004 v Bangladesh
- Last ODI: 25 June 2008 v India

Domestic team information
- Years: Team
- 1991/92: Pakistan University Grants Commission
- 1993/94–1994/95: Lahore City
- Kowloon Cricket Club

Career statistics
Competition	ODI	FC	LA
Matches	4	7	10
Runs scored	22	107	44
Batting average	7.33	10.70	7.33
100s/50s	0/0	0/0	0/0
Top score	22	21	22
Balls bowled	180	762	384
Wickets	4	16	12
Bowling average	56.75	29.00	34.00
5 wickets in innings	0	1	0
10 wickets in match	0	0	0
Best bowling	1/31	5/23	3/29
Catches/stumpings	1/–	0/–	1/–
- Source: CricketArchive, 30 November 2009

Afzaal Haider (born 12 December 1971) is a Pakistani-born Hong Kong cricketer.

== Career ==
Haider has played two One Day Internationals for Hong Kong in addition to two first-class games for the team and several games for Lahore City in Pakistani domestic cricket. Haider is a specialist fast pace bowler, whose highest score with the bat is 22, coming in a 47-run eighth-wicket partnership with Manoj Cheruparambil against Pakistan at the 2004 Asia Cup. With the ball, his best figures are five for 23 against Nepal in the first-class 2005 ICC Intercontinental Cup tournament.

Haider began his career in Pakistan in 1991–92, playing three first-class games and three List A games for Pakistan University Grants Commission. He took five List A wickets, but was expensive, conceding runs at 5.5 an over - and was subsequently dropped. He then played five games for Lahore City.

Haider came to Hong Kong in 2000 and quickly joined the Hong Kong national team. Following a brief stint at Little Sai Wan Cricket Club in his first domestic season, he joined Kowloon Cricket Club and played under it for the rest of his domestic cricketing career. Alongside playing for and captaining teams including KCC Tartars and KCC Templars, he also spent seven years as Head Coach of Kowloon Cricket Club.

== Coaching career ==
Haider was the Head Cricket Coach of Kowloon Cricket Club from August 2002 to June 2010. During his tenure, he coached the first iteration of the women's cricket team in Kowloon Cricket Club, the KCC Maidens.

Haider was appointed interim coach of Hong Kong in October 2009 following the resignation of Aftab Habib.

== Personal life ==
Haider first came to Hong Kong in 2000, following his marriage. In November 2000, he and his wife welcomed their first child.

He has four children, all of whom play cricket in Hong Kong. The eldest, Maheen Haider, has been listed as a member of the Hong Kong national women's cricket squad, and has captained the women's team at Kowloon Cricket Club, the KCC Maidens. Zara Haider, his third daughter, was listed in the Hong Kong, China U19 Women's squad in 2025.
