= Ninad Shah =

Hong Kong cricketer (born 1997)

Personal information
- Full name: Ninad Devang Shah
- Born: 7 January 1997 (age 29)
- Relatives: Kinchit Shah (brother)

International information
- National side: Hong Kong
- Source: ESPNcricinfo, 30 August 2016

Ninad Shah (born 7 January 1997) is a Hong Kong cricketer. He made his first-class cricket debut against Ireland in the 2015–17 ICC Intercontinental Cup on 30 August 2016.

His brother Kinchit Shah also plays cricket for the Hong Kong national team.
