= Christopher Carter (cricketer) =

Hong Kong cricketer (born 1997)

Personal information
- Full name: Christopher Carter
- Born: 9 September 1997 (age 29); Hong Kong
- Batting: Right-handed
- Role: Wicket-keeper

International information
- National side: Hong Kong (2015–2018)
- ODI debut (cap 31): 16 November 2015 v UAE
- Last ODI: 18 September 2018 v India
- T20I debut (cap 18): 21 November 2015 v Oman
- Last T20I: 18 January 2017 v Netherlands

Career statistics
Competition	ODI	T20I	FC	LA
Matches	11	10	5	17
Runs scored	114	55	177	221
Batting average	12.66	13.75	19.66	14.73
100s/50s	0/0	0/0	0/1	0/0
Top score	43	17	84	43
Catches/stumpings	10/2	2/1	11/2	13/4
- Source: ESPNcricinfo, 1 October 2018

Christopher Carter (born 9 September 1997) is a Hong Kong former cricketer. He made his first-class debut for Hong Kong against the United Arab Emirates in the 2015–17 ICC Intercontinental Cup tournament on 11 November 2015. His One Day International debut was also against the United Arab Emirates in the 2015–17 ICC World Cricket League Championship on 16 November 2015. He made his Twenty20 International debut against Oman on 21 November 2015.

In August 2018, he was named in Hong Kong's squad for the 2018 Asia Cup Qualifier tournament. Hong Kong won the qualifier tournament, and he was then named in Hong Kong's squad for the 2018 Asia Cup.

In October 2018, Carter announced that he was quitting international cricket to become a pilot in Australia.
