= Tim Smart (cricketer) =

Australian-born Hong Kong cricketer (born 1972)

Personal information
- Full name: Timothy Trudeau Smart
- Born: 10 July 1972 (age 54); Australia
- Batting: Right-handed
- Role: Wicket-keeper

International information
- National side: Hong Kong
- ODI debut (cap 11): 16 July 2004 v Bangladesh
- Last ODI: 18 July 2004 v Pakistan

Career statistics
Competition	ODI	First-class
Matches	2	2
Runs scored	34	52
Batting average	17.00	17.33
100s/50s	0/0	0/0
Top score	25	20
Catches/stumpings	3/0	0/0
- Source: CricketArchive, 23 August 2007

Timothy Trudeau Smart (born 10 July 1972) is an Australian-born Hong Kong cricketer.

Smart is an aggressive right-handed batsman and wicket-keeper and has played cricket in Hong Kong for a number of years. He made his One Day International debut for his adopted nation in the 2004 Asia Cup against Bangladesh.

Smart made his first-class debut in 2005.
