= 2026 Hong Kong Sixes =

Six-a-side cricket tournament in Hong Kong

- Dates: 30 October – 1 November 2026
- Administrator: Cricket Hong Kong, China
- Cricket format: Six-a-side; 6 overs match
- Tournament format(s): Round-robin and Knockouts
- Host: Hong Kong
- Champions: Afghanistan (1st title)
- Runners-up: Australia
- Participants: 12
- Matches: 30 (plus a women's exhibition match)
- Player of the series: (Pakistan) Abbas Afridi
- Most runs: (Pakistan) Abbas Afridi (216) (Australia) Max Bryant (216)
- Most wickets: (Oman) Muzahir Raza (8)
- Official website: Official website

The 2026 Hong Kong Sixes was the 22nd edition of the Hong Kong Sixes that took place at the Mission Road Ground in Mong Kok, Hong Kong. The tournament consisted of 12 nations and was played across three days from 30 October to 1 November 2026.

== Background ==
The Hong Kong Cricket Sixes is a six-a-side international cricket tournament held at the Kowloon Cricket Club. It is organised by the Cricket Hong Kong, China and was sanctioned by the International Cricket Council. The first edition was played in 1992 and was last played in 2025. The tournament returned in 2024 after a 7-year hiatus and the number of teams was increased to 12 teams in the previous two editions. Pakistan were the defending champions, having defeated Kuwait in the previous cup final.

=== Rules and regulations ===
All standard laws of the game as laid down by the MCC applied with the following significant differences:

- Games are played between two teams of six players.
- Games consist of six overs of six balls.
- Each member of the fielding side, except for the wicket-keeper, shall bowl one over with only one member bowling two overs non consecutively.
- Wides and no-balls count as the usual extra run to the batting side, plus an extra ball, with no free hit for no-balls.
- A batter must retire 'not out' on reaching a personal score of 50 runs but may not retire before reaching 50 runs. If one of the last pair of batters is out, any retired 'not out' batter may resume his innings.
- If five wickets fall before the 6 overs are completed, the last remaining batter shall bat on with the 5th out batter acting as a runner. The last remaining batter must always be the striker, and shall be declared out if his partner gets out (run out or obstructing the field). The innings shall be completed at the fall of the sixth wicket.

=== Format ===
The tournament featured 12 teams divided into four pools, each containing three teams. After the round-robin stage, the first placed team from each group competed in the Cup finals, the second placed team from each group competed in the Plate finals, and the third-placed teams competed in the Bowl finals.

- Cup Finals: The first placed teams from each group will play in the semi-final round of the Cup finals, with the winners advancing to the final and the losing teams competed in a Cup play-off.
- Plate Finals: The second placed teams from each group will play in the semi-final round of the Plate finals, with the winners advancing to the final and the losing teams competed in a Plate play-off.
- Bowl Finals: The third placed teams from each group will play in the semi-final round of the Bowl finals, with the winners advancing to the final and the losing teams competed in a Bowl play-off.

== Teams ==
Group A	Group B	Group C	Group D
Australia; England; Hong Kong	Bangladesh; Scotland; Sri Lanka	India; Pakistan; United Arab Emirates	Afghanistan; Oman; South Africa

== Squads ==
Afghanistan	Australia	Bangladesh	England	Hong Kong	India
Gulbadin Naib (c); Karim Janat; Nangeyalai Kharote; Imran Mir; Sediqullah Pacha (wk); Abdul Rahman; Farmanullah Safi	Chris Green (c); Max Bryant; Nick Hobson (wk); Matthew Kelly; Kane Richardson; Alex Ross; Jack Wood	Abu Hider (c); Ahrar Amin; Samiun Basir; Mrittunjoy Chowdhury; Sabbir Rahman (wk); Chowdhury Rizwan; Habibur Rahman Sohan	John Simpson (c, wk); Martin Andersson; Ed Barnard; Jack Carson; Nathan Gilchrist; Fynn Hudson-Prentice; Dan Mousley	Yasim Murtaza (c); Babar Hayat; Aizaz Khan; Ehsan Khan; Nizakat Khan; Nasrulla Rana; Anshuman Rath (wk)	Krunal Pandya (c); T. Natarajan; Nitish Rana; Shashank Singh; Rahul Tewatia; Rahul Tripathi (wk); Kulwant Khejroliya
Oman	Pakistan	Scotland	South Africa	Sri Lanka	United Arab Emirates
Aamir Kaleem (c); Akbar Ali; Usman Ali; Zohaib Amanat; Sami Hassan (wk); Shafiq Jan; Muhammad Muzahir	Abbas Afridi (c, wk); Ahmed Daniyal; Irfan Khan Niazi; Saad Masood; Khawaja Nafay (wk); Abdul Samad; Mohammad Shehzad	Finlay McCreath (c, wk); Jasper Davidson; Jack Jarvis; Mackenzie Jones; Michael Leask; Lyle Robertson; Safyaan Sharif	Jorich van Schalkwyk (c); Abdullah Bayoumy; Ayabulela Gqamane; Alindile Mhletywa; Heath Richards; Blake Simpson; Steve Stolk (wk)	Sangeeth Cooray (c, wk); Ravindu Fernando; Vishen Halambage; Sachitha Jayathilake; Muditha Lakshan; Movin Subasingha; Chamindu Wijesinghe	Khalid Shah (c, wk); Zahid Ali; Mohammed Faraazuddin; Muhammad Farooq; Maroof Merchant; Ansh Tandon; Zuhaib Zubair

== Group stage ==
=== Group A ===
Pos	Team	Pld	W	L	Pts	NRR	Qualification
1	Australia	2	2	0	4	5.500	Advanced to Cup finals
2	Hong Kong (H)	2	1	1	2	2.750	Advanced to Plate finals
3	England	2	0	2	0	−8.250	Advanced to Bowl finals

Source: Cricinfo
(H) Host

30 October 2026
08:45
Scorecard

Australia; 135/4 (6 overs)	v	Hong Kong; 107/4 (6 overs)
Max Bryant 56 (13); Yasim Murtaza 1/10 (1 over)		Yasim Murtaza 32* (13); Patrick Dooley 2/32 (2 overs)

Australia won by 28 runs
Mission Road Ground, Mong Kok
Umpires: Tabarak Dar (HK) and John Prakash (HK)
Player of the match: Max Bryant (Aus)

- Hong Kong won the toss and elected to field.

30 October 2026
12:25
Scorecard

Hong Kong; 149 (6 overs)	v	England; 88/3 (6 overs)
Anshuman Rath 62 (13); Fynn Hudson-Prentice 3/18 (1 over)		Fynn Hudson-Prentice 26* (9); Nasrulla Rana 1/12 (1 over); Nizakat Khan 1/12 (1 over)

Hong Kong won by 61 runs
Mission Road Ground, Mong Kok
Umpires: Niaz Ali (HK) and Shelton J D'Cruz (HK)
Player of the match: Anshuman Rath (HK)

- England won the toss and elected to field.

30 October 2026
16:05
Scorecard

Australia; 159 (6 overs)	v	England; 121/0 (6 overs)
Max Bryant 56 (11); Nathan Gilchrist 2/53 (2 overs)		John Simpson 54* (12)

Australia won by 38 runs
Mission Road Ground, Mong Kok
Umpires: Shelton J D'Cruz (HK) and Hemant Tukrul (HK)
Player of the match: Nick Hobson (Aus)

- Australia won the toss and elected to bat.

=== Group B ===
Pos	Team	Pld	W	L	Pts	NRR	Qualification
1	Scotland	2	2	0	4	2.417	Advanced to Cup finals
2	Sri Lanka	2	1	1	2	−0.789	Advanced to Plate finals
3	Bangladesh	2	0	2	0	−1.525	Advanced to Bowl finals

Source: Cricinfo

30 October 2026
09:40
Scorecard

Bangladesh; 94/5 (6 overs)	v	Scotland; 97/5 (6 overs)
Habibur Rahman Sohan 25 (6); Michael Leask 3/34 (2 overs)		Finlay McCreath 53 (20); Habibur Rahman Sohan 1/14 (1 over)

Scotland won by 1 wicket
Mission Road Ground, Mong Kok
Umpires: Aftab Ahmed (HK) and Niaz Ali (HK)
Player of the match: Finlay McCreath (Sco)

- Scotland won the toss and elected to field.

30 October 2026
13:20
Scorecard

Bangladesh; 127/4 (6 overs)	v	Sri Lanka; 129/5 (5.2 overs)
Habibur Rahman Sohan 57* (15); Vishen Halambage 1/16 (1 over)		Vishen Halambage 80* (17); Mrittunjoy Chowdhury 4/44 (2.2 overs)

Sri Lanka won by 1 wicket
Mission Road Ground, Mong Kok
Umpires: Aftab Ahmed (HK) and Hemant Tukrul (HK)
Player of the match: Vishen Halambage (SL)

- Sri Lanka won the toss and elected to field.

31 October 2026
09:40
Scorecard

Scotland; 144/4 (6 overs)	v	Sri Lanka; 118/3 (6 overs)
Michael Leask 70* (15); Muditha Lakshan 2/45 (2 overs)		Vishen Halambage 30 (12); Jasper Davidson 3/23 (1.4 overs)

Scotland won by 26 runs
Mission Road Ground, Mong Kok
Umpires: Niaz Ali (HK) and Hemant Tukrul (HK)
Player of the match: Michael Leask (Sco)

- Sri Lanka won the toss and elected to field.

=== Group C ===
Pos	Team	Pld	W	L	Pts	NRR	Qualification
1	United Arab Emirates	2	2	0	4	3.269	Advanced to Cup finals
2	Pakistan	2	1	1	2	3.617	Advanced to Plate finals
3	India	2	0	2	0	−7.854	Advanced to Bowl finals

Source: Cricinfo

30 October 2026
10:35
Scorecard

Pakistan; 106/3 (6 overs)	v	United Arab Emirates; 109/5 (6 overs)
Abbas Afridi 53 (13); Maroof Merchant 1/17 (1 over)		Khalid Shah 71 (20); Abdul Samad 1/9 (1 over)

United Arab Emirates won by 1 wicket
Mission Road Ground, Mong Kok
Umpires: Tabarak Dar (HK) and Shelton J D'Cruz (HK)
Player of the match: Khalid Shah (UAE)

- Pakistan won the toss and elected to bat.

30 October 2026
14:15
Scorecard

India; 88 (6 overs)	v	Pakistan; 91/2 (3.5 overs)
Shashank Singh 40 (11); Abdul Samad 2/10 (1 over)		Khawaja Nafay 41 (12); Shashank Singh 1/14 (1 over)

Pakistan won by 4 wickets
Mission Road Ground, Mong Kok
Umpires: Tabarak Dar (HK) and John Prakash (HK)
Player of the match: Abbas Afridi (Pak)

- Pakistan won the toss and elected to field.

31 October 2026
10:35
Scorecard

India; 94 (6 overs)	v	United Arab Emirates; 97/0 (4.2 overs)
T Natarajan 38 (14); Zahid Ali 3/32 (2 overs)		Khalid Shah 52* (14)

United Arab Emirates Won by 6 wickets
Mission Road Ground, Mong Kok
Umpires: Tabarak Dar (HK) and Shelton J D'Cruz (HK)
Player of the match: Zahid Ali (UAE)

- United Arab Emirates won the toss and elected to field.

=== Group D ===
Pos	Team	Pld	W	L	Pts	NRR	Qualification
1	Afghanistan	2	2	0	4	1.995	Advanced to Cup finals
2	Oman	2	1	1	2	2.770	Advanced to Plate finals
3	South Africa	2	0	2	0	−4.500	Advanced to Bowl finals

Source: Cricinfo

30 October 2026
11:30
Scorecard

Oman; 107/2 (6 overs)	v	South Africa; 58 (4 overs)
Zohaib Amanat 52* (15); Heath Richards 1/16 (1 over)		Abdullah Bayoumy 35 (13); Muzahir Raza 3/17 (1 over)

Oman won by 49 runs
Mission Road Ground, Mong Kok
Umpires: John Prakash (HK) and Hemant Tukrul (HK)
Player of the match: Muzahir Raza (Oman)

- South Africa won the toss and elected to field.

30 October 2026
15:10
Scorecard

South Africa; 107/1 (6 overs)	v	Afghanistan; 112/3 (6 overs)
Jorich van Schalkwyk 52* (17); Gulbadin Naib 1/24 (2 overs)		Farmanullah 38* (14); Alindile Mhletywa 2/25 (2 overs)

Afghanistan won by 3 wickets
Mission Road Ground, Mong Kok
Umpires: Niaz Ali (HK) and Tabarak Dar (HK)
Player of the match: Farmanullah (Afg)

- South Africa won the toss and elected to bat.

31 October 2026
08:45
Scorecard

Oman; 120/4 (6 overs)	v	Afghanistan; 125/2 (5.2 overs)
Usman Ali 71* (17); Karim Janat 1/15 (1 over)		Sediqullah Pacha 45* (10); Muzahir Raza 1/17 (1 over)

Afghanistan won by 4 wickets
Mission Road Ground, Mong Kok
Umpires: Tabarak Dar (HK) and John Prakash (HK)
Player of the match: Sediqullah Pacha (Afg)

- Oman won the toss and elected to bat.

== Bowl finals ==
Semi-finals
B3	Bangladesh	129/4 (6 overs)
D3	South Africa	132/5 (6 overs)
A3	England	124/2 (6 overs)
C3	India	121/4 (6 overs)

Final
SF1W	South Africa	101/1 (5.1 overs)
SF2W	England	95 (6 overs)
11th place Play-off
SF1L	Bangladesh	116/5 (6 overs)
SF2L	India	117/1 (6 overs)

Semi-final 1
31 October 2026
11:30
Scorecard

Bangladesh; 129/4 (6 overs)	v	South Africa; 132/5 (6 overs)
Habibur Rahman Sohan 60* (14); Ayabulela Gqamane 1/28 (2 overs)		Jorich van Schalkwyk 77* (20); Chowdhury Md Rizwan 2/20 (1 over)

South Africa won by 1 wicket
Mission Road Ground, Mong Kok
Umpires: Aftab Ahmed (HK) and John Prakash (HK)
Player of the match: Jorich van Schalkwyk (SA)

- South Africa won the toss and elected to field.

Semi-final 2
31 October 2026
12:25
Scorecard

England; 124/2 (6 overs)	v	India; 121/4 (6 overs)
Martin Andersson 51 (13); Nitish Rana 1/18 (1 over)		Rahul Tripathi 56* (14); Nathan Gilchrist 2/25 (2 overs)

England won by 3 runs
Mission Road Ground, Mong Kok
Umpires: Niaz Ali (HK) and Shelton J D'Cruz (HK)
Player of the match: Martin Andersson (Eng)

- India won the toss and elected to field.

11th place Play-off
1 November 2026
09:40
Scorecard

Bangladesh; 116/5 (6 overs)	v	India; 117/1 (6 overs)
Abu Hider 62 (18); Krunal Pandya 3/25 (2 overs)		Shashank Singh 50 (15); Ahrar Amin 1/20 (1 over)

India won by 5 wickets
Mission Road Ground, Mong Kok
Umpires: Tabarak Dar (HK) and John Prakash (HK)
Player of the match: Krunal Pandya (Ind)

- India won the toss and elected to field.

Final
1 November 2026
13:20
Scorecard

England; 95 (6 overs)	v	South Africa; 101/1 (5.1 overs)
Ed Barnard 35 (11); Abdullah Bayoumy 3/7 (1 over)		Blake Simpson 55 (12); Fynn Hudson-Prentice 1/19 (1 over)

South Africa won by 5 wickets
Mission Road Ground, Mong Kok
Umpires: Niaz Ali (HK) and Tabarak Dar (HK)
Player of the match: Blake Simpson (SA)

- South Africa won the toss and elected to field.

== Plate finals ==
Semi-finals
B2	Sri Lanka	92/5 (6 overs)
D2	Oman	93/1 (4.4 overs)
A2	Hong Kong	106/3 (6 overs)
C2	Pakistan	107/0 (4.3 overs)

Final
SF1W	Oman	136/4 (6 overs)
SF2W	Pakistan	154/4 (6 overs)
7th place Play-off
SF1L	Sri Lanka	118/4 (6 overs)
SF2L	Hong Kong	119/0 (6 overs)

Semi-final 1
31 October 2026
13:20
Scorecard

Sri Lanka; 92/5 (6 overs)	v	Oman; 93/1 (4.4 overs)
Vishen Halambage 37 (12); Muzahir Raza 2/27 (2 overs)		Usman Ali 46 (14); Muditha Lakshan 1/8 (0.4 overs)

Oman won by 5 wickets
Mission Road Ground, Mong Kok
Umpires: Aftab Ahmed (HK) and Hemant Tukrul (HK)
Player of the match: Muzahir Raza (Oman)

- Oman won the toss and elected to field.

Semi-final 2
31 October 2026
14:15
Scorecard

Hong Kong; 106/3 (6 overs)	v	Pakistan; 107/0 (4.3 overs)
Nizakat Khan 38 (10); Irfan Khan Niazi 2/16 (1 over)		Abbas Afridi 55 (13)

Pakistan won by 6 wickets
Mission Road Ground, Mong Kok
Umpires: Tabarak Dar (HK) and John Prakash (HK)
Player of the match: Abbas Afridi (Pak)

- Pakistan won the toss and elected to field.

7th place Play-off
1 November 2026
10:35
Scorecard

Hong Kong; 119/0 (6 overs)	v	Sri Lanka; 118/4 (6 overs)
Anshuman Rath 51 (17)		Muditha Lakshan 52 (16); Yasim Murtaza 2/15 (1 over)

Hong Kong won by 1 run
Mission Road Ground, Mong Kok
Umpires: Aftab Ahmed (HK) and Ramasamy Venkatesh (HK)
Player of the match: Yasim Murtaza (HK)

- Sri Lanka won the toss and elected to field.

Final
1 November 2026
14:15
Scorecard

Pakistan; 154/4 (6 overs)	v	Oman; 136/4 (6 overs)
Abbas Afridi 73* (16); Muzahir Raza 2/46 (2 overs)		Usman Ali 67* (17)

Pakistan won by 18 runs
Mission Road Ground, Mong Kok
Umpires: Tabarak Dar (HK) and Ramasamy Venkatesh (HK)
Player of the match: Abbas Afridi (Pak)

- Oman won the toss and elected to field.

== Cup finals ==
Semi-finals
A1	Australia	141/3 (6 overs)
C1	United Arab Emirates	88 (5.3 overs)
B1	Scotland	100/3 (6 overs)
D1	Afghanistan	121/4 (6 overs)

Final
SF1W	Australia	115/5 (6 overs)
SF2W	Afghanistan	119/2 (5.1 overs)
3rd place Play-off
SF1L	United Arab Emirates	90/3 (6 overs)
SF2L	Scotland	135/1 (6 overs)

Semi-final 1
31 October 2026
15:10
Scorecard

Australia; 141/3 (6 overs)	v	United Arab Emirates; 88 (5.3 overs)
Max Bryant 60* (15); Zuhaib Zubair 1/19 (1 over)		Khalid Shah 38 (12); Alex Ross 2/11 (1 over)

Australia won by 53 runs
Mission Road Ground, Mong Kok
Umpires: Shelton J D'Cruz (HK) and Hemant Tukrul (HK)
Player of the match: Max Bryant (Aus)

- Australia won the toss and elected to bat.

Semi-final 2
31 October 2026
16:05
Scorecard

Afghanistan; 121/4 (6 overs)	v	Scotland; 100/3 (6 overs)
Gulbadin Naib 51* (16); Jasper Davidson 1/18 (2 overs)		Jack Jarvis 54* (17); Karim Janat 1/16 (2 overs)

Afghanistan won by 21 runs
Mission Road Ground, Mong Kok
Umpires: Niaz Ali (HK) and Tabarak Dar (HK)
Player of the match: Gulbadin Naib (Afg)

- Scotland won the toss and elected to field.

3rd place Play-off
1 November 2026
11:30
Scorecard

Scotland; 135/1 (6 overs)	v	United Arab Emirates; 90/3 (6 overs)
Michael Leask 53 (11)		Ansh Tandon 26* (14); Michael Leask 1/9 (1 over)

Scotland won by 45 runs
Mission Road Ground, Mong Kok
Umpires: Niaz Ali (HK) and Shelton J D'Cruz (HK)
Player of the match: Michael Leask (Sco)

- United Arab Emirates won the toss and elected to field.

Final
1 November 2026
15:10
Scorecard

Australia; 115/5 (6 overs)	v	Afghanistan; 119/2 (5.1 overs)
Max Bryant 44 (14); Nangeyalia Khan 1/17 (1 over)		Imran Mir 53* (14); Chris Green 1/30 (1 over)

Afghanistan won by 4 wickets
Mission Road Ground, Mong Kok
Umpires: Shelton J D'Cruz (HK) and John Prakash (HK)
Player of the match: Imran Mir (Afg)

- Australia won the toss and elected to bat.

== Women's exhibition match ==
The final day also featured a women's exhibition match between Hong Kong and China to highlight and promote growth and the development of women's cricket in the region.

1 November 2026
12:25
Scorecard
Scorecard

Hong Kong; 67/3 (6 overs)	v	China; 42/2 (6 overs)
Natasha Miles 34* (25); Wenjing Yin 2/17 (2 overs)		Yuanyuan Cai 13* (15)

Hong Kong won by 25 runs
Mission Road Ground, Mong Kok
Player of the match: Natasha Miles (HK)

- Hong Kong won the toss and elected to bat.
