= 2009 Hong Kong Sixes =

Hong Kong Cricket Sixes 2009
- Administrator: International Cricket Council
- Cricket format: Six-a-side
- Tournament format(s): Round-robin and Knockout
- Champions: South Africa (3rd title)
- Participants: 8
- Matches: 22
- Player of the series: (Hong Kong) Irfan Ahmed
- Most runs: (England) Peter Trego (184)
- Most wickets: (South Africa) David Wiese (7)
- Official website: Homepage

The 2009 Hong Kong Cricket Sixes was the fifteenth contesting of the tournament, taking place at Kowloon Cricket Club, Hong Kong. Eight nations competed in twenty-two matches over two days, 31 October – 1 November 2009. South Africa won the tournament, narrowly defeating hosts Hong Kong in the final, after Farhaan Behardien hit the required six off the last ball of the match.

Despite losing in the final, Hong Kong's Irfan Ahmed was awarded the Ben Hollioake Trophy, given to the player of the tournament. He played in all seven of Hong Kong's matches, and finished with 163 runs, which was bettered only by England's Peter Trego. He also claimed three wickets in the tournament, at an economy of 13.63 runs per over, ranking him fifth of all bowlers for economy. South Africa's David Wiese claimed the most wickets, taking seven in his seven matches. Peter Trego topped the batting charts with 184 runs, boosted by a top-score of 65* after returning to bat in England's third match after they'd lost four wickets. His 21 sixes were also the most scored by a batsman in the tournament.

== Squads ==
| England | India | Pakistan | Sri Lanka |
|---|---|---|---|
| Chris Read † (capt) | Anil Kumble (capt) | Faisal Iqbal † (capt) | Jeevantha Kulatunga (capt) |
| Darren Stevens | Jagadeesh Arunkumar † | Abdur Rauf | Kaushal Lokuarachchi |
| Graham Wagg | Lakshmipathy Balaji | Ahmed Shehzad | Chinthaka Jayasinghe |
| Graham Napier | Manish Pandey | Anwar Ali | Dilhara Lokuhettige |
| Jamie Dalrymple | Reetinder Sodhi | Junaid Zia | Hasantha Fernando |
| Peter Trego | Sridharan Sriram | Sohail Khan | Indika de Saram † |
| Rory Hamilton-Brown | Stuart Binny | Yasir Hameed | Nuwan Zoysa |
| Australia | Hong Kong | New Zealand | South Africa |
| Greg Moller † (capt) | Najeeb Amar (capt) | Craig McMillan (capt) | Davey Jacobs (capt) |
| Glenn Maxwell | Hussain Butt † | Anaru Kitchen | David Wiese |
| Jeremy Smith | Irfan Ahmed | Corey Anderson | Farhaan Behardien |
| Josh Hazlewood | Mark Wright | Craig Spearman † | Loots Bosman † |
| Marcus Stoinis | Munir Dar | Peter Fulton | Rory Kleinveldt |
| Michael Cranmer | Nadeem Ahmed | Shanan Stewart | Ryan Bailey |
| Simon Keen | Tanvir Afzal | | Werner Coetsee |

== Rules and regulations ==
All standard laws of the game as laid down by the MCC applied with the following significant differences:

=== General ===
Games are played between two teams of six players, and consist of five overs of six balls, with the exception of the final which consists of five overs of eight balls. Each member of the fielding team, with the exception of the wicket-keeper shall bowl one over. Wides and no-balls count as two runs to the batting team, plus an extra ball.

=== Last man stands ===
If five wickets fall (not including batsmen retiring not out) before the allocated overs have been completed, the remaining batsman continues, with the last batsman out remaining as a runner. The not out batsman shall always face strike, and shall be declared out if his partner is declared out.

=== Batsman retire ===
A batsman must retire not out on reaching 31 runs, but not before. He may complete all runs scored on the ball on which he reaches his 31, and retire immediately after. If one of the last pair of batsmen is out, any remaining not out batsman may resume his innings. In the case where there is more than one, they must return in the order they retired.

== Group stage ==
=== Northern hemisphere group ===
| Team | Pld | W | L | Pts | RR |
|---|---|---|---|---|---|
| England | 3 | 2 | 1 | 4 | 18.750 |
| Sri Lanka | 3 | 2 | 1 | 4 | 18.628 |
| Pakistan | 3 | 1 | 2 | 2 | 17.556 |
| India | 3 | 1 | 2 | 2 | 16.067 |

31 October 2009
Scorecard

| India; 88/2 (5 overs) | v | Sri Lanka; 82/3 (5 overs) |
| J Arunkumar 36** (11); CU Jayasinghe 1/13 [1] KS Lokuarachchi 1/13 [1] | | CU Jayasinghe 24 (14); RS Sodhi 1/6 [1] |

India won by 6 runs
Kowloon Cricket Club
Umpires: Kevin Bishop and Anoop Gidwani

31 October 2009
Scorecard

| England; 92/0 (5 overs) | v | Pakistan; 89/3 (5 overs) |
| PD Trego 35** (15); Abdur Rauf 0/7 [1] | | Anwar Ali 35* (13); JWM Dalrymple 1/10 [1] |

England won by 3 runs
Kowloon Cricket Club
Umpires: Kevin Bishop and Anoop Gidwani

31 October 2009
Scorecard

| Sri Lanka; 88/2 (5 overs) | v | Pakistan; 82/2 (5 overs) |
| DNT Zoysa 36** (10); Sohail Khan 1/14 [1] | | Abdur Rauf 30 (9); DNT Zoysa 1/12 [1] |

Sri Lanka won by 6 runs
Kowloon Cricket Club
Umpires: Sudhir Gidwani and C Howard

31 October 2009
Scorecard

| India; 88/4 (5 overs) | v | England; 89/2 (4.4 overs) |
| STR Binny 54* (15); DI Stevens 2/9 [1] | | PD Trego 35** (9); STR Binny 2/5 [0.4] |

England won by 4 wickets
Kowloon Cricket Club
Umpires: Kevin Bishop and Anoop Gidwani

31 October 2009
Scorecard

| India; 65/1 (5 overs) | v | Pakistan; 66/0 (3.3 overs) |
| MK Pandey 28* (14); Junaid Zia 1/13 [1] | | Ahmed Shehzad 31** (9); S Sriram 0/9 [0/3] |

Pakistan won by 6 wickets
Kowloon Cricket Club
Umpires: Kevin Bishop and Sudhir Gidwani

31 October 2009
Scorecard

| England; 94/4 (5 overs) | v | Sri Lanka; 97/1 (4.2 overs) |
| PD Trego 65* (14); KS Lokuarachchi 2/7 [1] | | HGJM Kulatunga 32** (10); GR Napier 1/14 [1] |

Sri Lanka won by 5 wickets
Kowloon Cricket Club
Umpires: Kevin Bishop and Anoop Gidwani

=== Southern hemisphere group ===
| Team | Pld | W | L | Pts | RR |
|---|---|---|---|---|---|
| Hong Kong | 3 | 3 | 0 | 6 | 20.838 |
| South Africa | 3 | 2 | 1 | 4 | 19.500 |
| New Zealand | 3 | 1 | 2 | 2 | 17.925 |
| Australia | 3 | 0 | 3 | 0 | 18.286 |

31 October 2009
Scorecard

| South Africa; 71/2 (5 overs) | v | Hong Kong; 73/1 (3.4 overs) |
| DJ Jacobs 32** (14); Munir Dar 1/6 [1] | | Irfan Ahmed 33** (7); David Wiese 1/17 [1] |

Hong Kong won by 5 wickets
Kowloon Cricket Club
Umpires: Sudhir Gidwani and C Howard

31 October 2009
Scorecard

| New Zealand; 92/3 (5 overs) | v | Hong Kong; 95/2 (4.1 overs) |
| CM Spearman 31** (8); Irfan Ahmed 1/7 [1] | | Irfan Ahmed 32** (6); CJ Anderson 2/20 [1] |

Hong Kong won by 4 wickets
Kowloon Cricket Club
Umpires: Sudhir Gidwani and C Howard

31 October 2009
Scorecard

| Australia; 110/2 (5 overs) | v | South Africa; 112/2 (4.4 overs) |
| GJ Maxwell 34** (10); D Wiese 1/16 [1] | | DJ Jacobs 33** (7); MP Stoinis 1/16 [1] |

South Africa won by 4 wickets
Kowloon Cricket Club
Umpires: Sudhir Gidwani and C Howard

31 October 2009
Scorecard

| Australia; 86/3 (5 overs) | v | Hong Kong; 89/2 (4.3 overs) |
| GJ Maxwell 29 (10); Najeeb Amar 2/13 [1] | | Munir Dar 33** (7); MP Stoinis 2/10 [1] |

Hong Kong won by 4 wickets
Kowloon Cricket Club
Umpires: Kevin Bishop and Anoop Gidwani

31 October 2009
Scorecard

| South Africa; 103/3 (5 overs) | v | New Zealand; 83/2 (5 overs) |
| RK Kleinveldt 34** (9); SL Stewart 1/18 [1] | | SL Stewart 33** (11); D Wiese 2/11 [1] |

South Africa won by 20 runs
Kowloon Cricket Club
Umpires: Sudhir Gidwani and C Howard

31 October 2009
Scorecard

| Australia; 60 (4 overs) | v | New Zealand; 64/2 (3.2 overs) |
| MP Stoinis 35 (12); CD McMillan 3/11 [1] | | AK Kitchen 32** (8); MP Stoinis 1/16 [1] |

New Zealand won by 4 wickets
Kowloon Cricket Club
Umpires: Sudhir Gidwani and C Howard

== Cup round-robin stage ==
| Team | Pld | W | L | Pts | RR |
|---|---|---|---|---|---|
| Hong Kong | 3 | 3 | 0 | 6 | 18.711 |
| South Africa | 3 | 2 | 1 | 4 | 19.636 |
| Sri Lanka | 3 | 1 | 2 | 2 | 16.537 |
| England | 3 | 0 | 3 | 0 | 16.933 |

1 November 2009
Scorecard

| Sri Lanka; 86/4 (5 overs) | v | South Africa; 88/5 (4.5 overs) |
| KS Lokuarachchi 34** (8); D Wiese 1/14 [1] | | LL Bosman 44* (14); KS Lokuarachchi 1/8 [0.5] |

South Africa won by 1 wicket
Kowloon Cricket Club
Umpires: Sudhir Gidwani and C Howard

1 November 2009
Scorecard

| England; 72/5 (5 overs) | v | Hong Kong; 75/0 (4.1 overs) |
| PD Trego 28 (11); Munir Dar 1/6 [1] Najeeb Amar 1/6 [1] | | Irfan Ahmed 34** (12); PD Trego 0/6 [0.1] |

Hong Kong won by 6 wickets
Kowloon Cricket Club
Umpires: Kevin Bishop and Anoop Gidwani

1 November 2009
Scorecard

| England; 102/3 (5 overs) | v | South Africa; 103/3 (4.5 overs) |
| GR Napier 36** (7); RK Kleinveldt 1/18 [1] | | DJ Jacobs 36** (8); DI Stevens 1/8 [1] |

South Africa won by 3 wickets
Kowloon Cricket Club
Umpires: Kevin Bishop and Anoop Gidwani

1 November 2009
Scorecard

| Sri Lanka; 59/5 (5 overs) | v | Hong Kong; 62/0 (3.3 overs) |
| DNT Zoysa 27 (8); Irfan Ahmed 1/2 [1] | | Irfan Ahmed 32** (11); KHRK Fernando 0/8 [0.3] |

Hong Kong won by 6 wickets
Kowloon Cricket Club
Umpires: Sudhir Gidwani and C Howard

1 November 2009
Scorecard

| South Africa; 97/2 (5 overs) | v | Hong Kong; 100/2 (5 overs) |
| DJ Jacobs 34** (8); MJW Wright 1/12 [1] | | KH Butt 33** (10); D Wiese 1/14 [1] |

Hong Kong won by 4 wickets
Kowloon Cricket Club
Umpires: Sudhir Gidwani and C Howard

1 November 2009
Scorecard

| England; 80/4 (5 overs) | v | Sri Lanka; 81/4 (3.4 overs) |
| GG Wagg 28* (6); KHRK Fernando 2/7 [1] KS Lokuarachchi 2/7 [1] | | HGJM Kulatunga 29 (9); DI Stevens 1/13 [1] |

Sri Lanka won by 2 wickets
Kowloon Cricket Club
Umpires: Kevin Bishop and Anoop Gidwani

== Plate ==
=== Semi-finals ===
1 November 2009
Scorecard

| Pakistan; 77/3 (5 overs) | v | Australia; 80/0 (5 overs) |
| Faisal Iqbal 31** (14); MRC Cranmer 1/14 [1] | | GD Moller 33** (11); Abdur Rauf 1/11 [1] |

Australia won by 6 wickets
Kowloon Cricket Club
Umpires: Sudhir Gidwani and C Howard

1 November 2009
Scorecard

| India; 77/4 (5 overs) | v | New Zealand; 78/0 (3.3 overs) |
| MK Pandey 34* (10); AK Kitchen 2/19 [1] | | AK Kitchen 34** (9); S Sriram 0/8 [0.3] |

New Zealand won by 6 wickets
Kowloon Cricket Club
Umpires: Kevin Bishop and Anoop Gidwani

=== Final ===
1 November 2009
Scorecard

| Australia; 69 (4.5 overs) | v | New Zealand; 70/1 (5 overs) |
| MRC Cranmer 17 (8); PG Fulton 1/7 [1] | | SL Stewart 31* (9); JR Hazlewood 1/29 [1] |

New Zealand won by 5 wickets
Kowloon Cricket Club
Umpires: Sudhir Gidwani and C Howard

== Cup Final ==
1 November 2009
Scorecard

| Hong Kong; 97/4 (5 overs) | v | South Africa; 99/4 (5 overs) |
| Munir Dar 31** (12); D Wiese 1/11 [1] | | F Behardien 37* (10); Tanvir Afzal 3/11 [1] |

South Africa won by 2 wickets
Kowloon Cricket Club
Umpires: Kevin Bishop and Anoop Gidwani

== Final standings ==
| Position | Country | Result |
|---|---|---|
| 1st | South Africa | Champions |
| 2nd | Hong Kong | Runners-up |
| 3rd | Sri Lanka | |
| 4th | England | |
| 5th | New Zealand | Plate winners |
| 6th | Australia | Plate runners-up |
| 7th | Pakistan | |
| 8th | India | |

== Notes ==
- ** is used to signify that a batsman was forced to retire not out as his personal score was 31 or more.
