= 2011 Hong Kong Sixes =

Hong Kong Cricket Sixes 2011
- Administrator: International Cricket Council
- Cricket format: Six-a-side
- Tournament format(s): Round-robin and Knockout
- Champions: Pakistan (5th title)
- Participants: 12
- Matches: 27
- Player of the series: Umar Akmal
- Most runs: Umar Akmal (254)
- Most wickets: Rory Hamilton-Brown; Abdul Razzaq; Umar Akmal (6)
- Official website: http://www.cricket.com.hk

The 2011 Hong Kong Cricket Sixes was the seventeenth edition of the Hong Kong Cricket Sixes, taking place at Kowloon Cricket Club, Hong Kong. Twelve teams competed in the tournament which lasted over three days from 28 to 30 October 2011. The tournament also featured China for the second time playing an exhibition match with a Hong Kong development team. The tournament was won by Pakistan who defeated England in the final.

== Squads ==
Pool A
Woodworm All Stars	New Zealand	Scotland	Sri Lanka
Sanath Jayasuriya (c); Shahid Afridi; Piyush Chawla; Herschelle Gibbs; R.P. Singh; Ryan ten Doeschate; Lou Vincent	Jacob Oram (c); Derek de Boorder (wk); James Franklin; Nathan McCullum; Rob Nicol; Kieran Noema-Barnett; Luke Woodcock	Richard Berrington (c); Gordon Goudie; Majid Haq; Calum MacLeod; Preston Mommsen; Safyaan Sharif; Craig Wallace	Chamara Kapugedera (c); Dilshan Munaweera; Chathura Peiris; Kusal Perera; Thisara Perera; Ashan Priyanjan; Sachith Pathirana
Pool B
Australia	Bangladesh	England	Ireland
Rhett Lockyear (c); Scott Coyte; Jason Floros; Ben Laughlin; Craig Philipson; Jeremy Smith; Adam Zampa	Mosharraf Hossain (c); Alauddin Babu; Tapash Baisya; Enamul Haque Jr; Nazmul Hossain; Sabbir Rahman; Rony Talukdar	Rory Hamilton-Brown (c); Rikki Clarke; Josh Cobb; Chris Read (wk); Tom Smith; Darren Stevens; Peter Trego	Kevin O'Brien (c); Alex Cusack; George Dockrell; John Mooney; Niall O'Brien (wk); Max Sorensen; Paul Stirling
Pool C
Hong Kong	India	Pakistan	South Africa
Najeeb Amar (c); Tanwir Afzal; Haseeb Amjad; Munir Dar; Babar Hayat (wk); Nizakat Khan; Peter Wooden	Dinesh Karthik (c); Mayank Agarwal; Raju Bhatkal; Manvinder Bisla; Sridharan Sriram; Shalabh Srivastava; Ganapathi Vignesh	Abdul Razzaq (c); Umar Akmal; Hammad Azam; Sharjeel Khan; Rameez Raja; Yasir Shah; Sohail Tanvir	Mangaliso Mosehle (c) & (wk); Richard Cameron; Dillon du Preez; Matt Hulett; Lyall Meyer; Aubrey Swanepoel; Lenert van Wyk

== Rules and regulations ==
All standard laws of the game as laid down by the MCC applied with the following significant differences:

=== General ===
Games are played between two teams of six players, and consist of five overs of six balls, with the exception of the final which consists of five overs of eight balls. Each member of the fielding side, with the exception of the wicket-keeper shall bowl one over. Wides and no-balls count as two runs to the batting side, plus an extra ball.

=== Last man stands ===
If five wickets fall (not including batsmen retiring not out) before the allocated overs have been completed, the remaining batsman continues, with the last batsman out remaining as a runner. The not out batsman shall always face strike, and shall be declared out if his partner is declared out.

=== Batsman retire ===
A batsman must retire not out on reaching 31 runs, but not before. He may complete all runs scored on the ball on which he reaches his 31, and retire immediately after. If one of the last pair of batsmen is out, any remaining not out batsman may resume his innings. In the case where there is more than one, they must return in the order they retired.

== Group stage ==
=== Pool A ===
Team	Pld	W	L	Pts	RR
Sri Lanka	3	2	1	4	19.600
Woodworm All Stars	3	2	1	4	18.767
Scotland	3	2	1	4	17.462
New Zealand	3	0	3	0	16.800

28 October 2011
Scorecard

Sri Lanka; 83/5 (5 overs)	v	Scotland; 53/3 (5 overs)
Chamara Kapugedera 34* (12); Safyaan Sharif 1/14 [1]		Richard Berrington 22 (15); Thisara Perera 1/8 [1]

Sri Lanka won by 30 runs
Kowloon Cricket Club
Umpires: Clive Howard and Michael Walsh

28 October 2011
Scorecard

New Zealand; 88/0 (5 overs)	v	Scotland; 94/0 (3.5 overs)
Nathan McCullum 34** (11); Preston Mommsen 0/6 [1]		Calum MacLeod 32** (9); James Franklin 0/18 [0.5]

Scotland won by 6 wickets
Kowloon Cricket Club
Umpires: Clive Howard and Roger Nissim

29 October 2011
Scorecard

Woodworm All Stars; 77/1 (5 overs)	v	Scotland; 80/1 (4.1 overs)
Sanath Jayasuriya 34** (13); Preston Mommsen 1/12 [1]		Calum MacLeod 37** (11); Ryan ten Doeschate 1/18 [1]

Scotland won by 5 wickets
Kowloon Cricket Club
Umpires: Clive Howard and Michael Walsh

29 October 2011
Scorecard

Sri Lanka; 119/0 (5 overs)	v	New Zealand; 75/4 (5 overs)
Chamara Kapugedera 35** (10); Nathan McCullum 0/16 [1]		Derek de Boorder 34* (14); Kusal Perera 2/13 [1]

Sri Lanka won by 44 runs
Kowloon Cricket Club
Umpires: Clive Howard and Michael Walsh

29 October 2011
Scorecard

Woodworm All Stars; 102/1 (5 overs)	v	Sri Lanka; 92/2 (5 overs)
Sanath Jayasuriya 34** (12); Thisara Perera 1/12 [1]		Kusal Perera 34** (12); Sanath Jayasuriya 1/14 [1]

Woodworm All Stars won by 10 runs
Kowloon Cricket Club
Umpires: Kevin Bishop and Anoop Gidwani

29 October 2011
Scorecard

New Zealand; 89/2 (5 overs)	v	Woodworm All Stars; 90/4 (4.2 overs)
Luke Woodcock 36** (13); Shahid Afridi 1/16 [1]		Lou Vincent 55* (11); Nathan McCullum 1/2 [0.2]

Woodworm All Stars won by 2 wickets
Kowloon Cricket Club
Umpires: Kevin Bishop and Anoop Gidwani

=== Pool B ===
Team	Pld	W	L	Pts	RR
England	3	2	1	4	17.788
Ireland	3	2	1	4	17.620
Australia	3	1	2	2	19.133
Bangladesh	3	1	2	2	16.467

28 October 2011
Scorecard

Bangladesh; 65/4 (5 overs)	v	Ireland; 66/1 (3.1 overs)
Enamul Haque Jr 21 (6); Kevin O'Brien 2/11 [1]		Niall O'Brien 35** (9); Mosharraf Hossain 1/15 [1]

Ireland won by 5 wickets
Kowloon Cricket Club
Umpires: Clive Howard and Michael Walsh

28 October 2011
Scorecard

Bangladesh; 81/2 (5 overs)	v	England; 83/2 (4.5 overs)
Nazmul Hossain 31** (13); Rory Hamilton-Brown 2/14 [1]		Darren Stevens 35** (10); Nazmul Hossain 1/11 [1]

England won by 4 wickets
Kowloon Cricket Club
Umpires: Clive Howard and Roger Nissim

28 October 2011
Scorecard

Ireland; 81/2 (5 overs)	v	Australia; 83/2 (4.5 overs)
Craig Philipson 44** (13); John Mooney 1/12 [1]		Paul Stirling 33** (15); Scott Coyte 1/7 [1]

Australia won by 4 wickets.
Kowloon Cricket Club
Umpires: Kevin Bishop and Anoop Gidwani

29 October 2011
Scorecard

Australia; 97/1 (5 overs)	v	Bangladesh; 101/0 (5 overs)
Jason Floros 34** (11); Tapash Baisya 1/15 [1]		Sabbir Rahman 32* (8); Adam Zampa 0/7 [1]

Bangladesh won by 6 wickets
Kowloon Cricket Club
Umpires: Kevin Bishop and Anoop Gidwani

29 October 2011
Scorecard

Ireland; 88/3 (5 overs)	v	England; 82/0 (5 overs)
Niall O'Brien 35** (8); Tom Smith 1/11 [1]		Peter Trego 33** (18); George Dockrell 0/6 [1]

Ireland won by 6 runs
Kowloon Cricket Club
Umpires: Clive Howard and Michael Walsh

29 October 2011
Scorecard

Australia; 85/4 (5 overs)	v	England; 87/3 (4.2 overs)
Jason Floros 25 (10); Josh Cobb 1/12 [1]		Chris Read 32** (8); Scott Coyte 2/12 [1]

England won by 3 wickets
Kowloon Cricket Club
Umpires: Kevin Bishop and Anoop Gidwani

=== Pool C ===
Team	Pld	W	L	Pts	RR
Hong Kong	3	2	1	4	22.200
Pakistan	3	2	1	4	20.629
India	3	2	1	4	20.400
South Africa	3	0	3	0	17.800

28 October 2011
Scorecard

Hong Kong; 117/1 (5 overs)	v	India; 119/1 (5 overs)
Munir Dar 34** (8); Shalabh Srivastava 1/11 [1]		Dinesh Karthik 34** (8); Munir Dar 1/17 [1]

India won by 5 wickets
Kowloon Cricket Club
Umpires: Kevin Bishop and Anoop Gidwani

28 October 2011
Scorecard

Pakistan; 110/3 (5 overs)	v	South Africa; 87/2 (5 overs)
Sohail Tanvir 38** (8); Aubrey Swanepoel 1/28 [1]		Richard Cameron 33** (9); Sohail Tanvir 1/7 [1]

Pakistan won by 23 runs
Kowloon Cricket Club
Umpires: Kevin Bishop and Anoop Gidwani

29 October 2011
Scorecard

Pakistan; 87 (4.5 overs)	v	Hong Kong; 92/3 (4.4 overs)
Umar Akmal 44 (9); Najeeb Amar 2/13 [0.5]		Nizakat Khan 34** (7); Umar Akmal 1/12 [0.4]

Hong Kong won by 3 wickets
Kowloon Cricket Club
Umpires: Clive Howard and Michael Walsh

29 October 2011
Scorecard

India; 100/2 (5 overs)	v	South Africa; 95/3 (5 overs)
Mayank Agarwal 33** (8); Lenert van Wyk 1/16 [1]		Lenert van Wyk 36* (16); Raju Bhatkal 2/13 [1]

India won by 5 runs
Kowloon Cricket Club
Umpires: Kevin Bishop and Anoop Gidwani

29 October 2011
Scorecard

South Africa; 85/3 (5 overs)	v	Hong Kong; 87/1 (3.4 overs)
Dillon du Preez 31** (11); Najeeb Amar 2/15 [1]		Munir Dar 33** (9); Dillon du Preez 1/7 [0.4]

Hong Kong won by 5 wickets
Kowloon Cricket Club
Umpires: Kevin Bishop and Anoop Gidwani

29 October 2011
Scorecard

Pakistan; 109/5 (5 overs)	v	India; 87/1 (5 overs)
Umar Akmal 52* (11); Dinesh Karthik 2/12 [1]		Mayank Agarwal 36** (12); Yasir Shah 1/16 [1]

Pakistan won by 22 runs
Kowloon Cricket Club
Umpires: Clive Howard and Michael Walsh

=== Ranking of third-placed teams ===
Group	Team	Pld	W	L	Pts	RR
C	India	3	2	1	4	20.400
A	Scotland	3	2	1	4	17.462
B	Australia	3	1	2	2	19.133

== Play-offs ==
30 October 2011
Scorecard

Bangladesh; 112/2 (5 overs)	v	New Zealand; 37 (3.3 overs)
Sabbir Rahman 34** (9); Rob Nicol 1/18 [1]		Nathan McCullum 17 (5); Tapash Baisya 2/1 [0.3]

Bangladesh won by 75 runs
Kowloon Cricket Club
Umpires: Kevin Bishop and Anoop Gidwani

30 October 2011
Scorecard

South Africa; 98/4 (5 overs)	v	Australia; 51 (4 overs)
Matt Hulett 40* (10); Adam Zampa 1/13 [1]		Craig Philipson 28 (10); Matt Hulett 3/5 [1]

South Africa won by 47 runs
Kowloon Cricket Club
Umpires: Kevin Bishop and Anoop Gidwani

== Knockout stage ==
Quarter-finals
30 October - Kowloon
Sri Lanka	121/2
Woodworm All Stars	118/1
30 October - Kowloon
England	101/4
India	99/1
30 October - Kowloon
Hong Kong	101/3
Scotland	100/0
30 October - Kowloon
Ireland	86/2
Pakistan	87/4

Semi-finals
30 October - Kowloon
Sri Lanka	94/3
England	101/2
30 October - Kowloon
Hong Kong	84/4
Pakistan	116/3

Final
30 October - Kowloon
England	119
Pakistan	154/5

=== Quarter-finals ===
30 October 2011
Scorecard

Woodworm All Stars; 118/1 (5 overs)	v	Sri Lanka; 121/2 (5 overs)
Sanath Jayasuriya 34** (6); Thisara Perera 1/10 [1]		Dilshan Munaweera 34** (7); Ryan ten Doeschate 1/14 [1]

Sri Lanka won by 4 wickets
Kowloon Cricket Club
Umpires: Clive Howard and Michael Walsh

30 October 2011
Scorecard

India; 99/1 (5 overs)	v	England; 101/4 (4.4 overs)
Mayank Agarwal 35** (9); Josh Cobb 1/22 [1]		Rory Hamilton-Brown 34* (9); Mayank Agarwal 2/17 [1]

England won by 2 wickets
Kowloon Cricket Club
Umpires: Kevin Bishop and Anoop Gidwani

30 October 2011
Scorecard

Scotland; 100/0 (5 overs)	v	Hong Kong; 101/3 (4.1 overs)
Calum MacLeod 36** (10); Haseeb Amjad 0/14 [1]		Nizakat Khan 30 (7); Majid Haq 1/30 [1]

Hong Kong won by 3 wickets
Kowloon Cricket Club
Umpires: Clive Howard and Michael Walsh

30 October 2011
Scorecard

Ireland; 86/2 (5 overs)	v	Pakistan; 87/4 (4.4 overs)
Paul Stirling 33** (8); Sohail Tanvir 1/11 [1]		Umar Akmal 40* (10); Kevin O'Brien 1/10 [1]

Pakistan won by 2 wickets
Kowloon Cricket Club
Umpires: Kevin Bishop and Anoop Gidwani

=== Semi-finals ===
30 October 2011
Scorecard

England; 101/2 (5 overs)	v	Sri Lanka; 94/3 (5 overs)
Rikki Clarke 34** (8); Chathura Peiris 2/12 [1]		Thisara Perera 31** (8); Darren Stevens 2/8 [1]

England won by 7 runs
Kowloon Cricket Club
Umpires: Clive Howard and Michael Walsh

30 October 2011
Scorecard

Pakistan; 116/2 (5 overs)	v	Hong Kong; 84/4 (5 overs)
Umar Akmal 34** (6); Tanwir Afzal 2/13 [1]		Haseeb Amjad 38* (10); Abdul Razzaq 2/10 [1]

Pakistan won by 32 runs
Kowloon Cricket Club
Umpires: Clive Howard and Michael Walsh

=== Final ===
30 October 2011
Scorecard

Pakistan; 154/5 (5 overs)	v	England; 119 (5 overs)
Abdul Razzaq 63* (17); Tom Smith 1/22 [1]		Peter Trego 32 (10); Umar Akmal 3/26 [1]

Pakistan won by 35 runs
Kowloon Cricket Club
Umpires: Clive Howard and Michael Walsh

== Notes ==
- ** is used to signify that a batsman was forced to retire not out as his personal score was 31 or more.

== External source ==
http://www.espncricinfo.com/ci/content/series/533563.html
