= Cricket in Hong Kong =

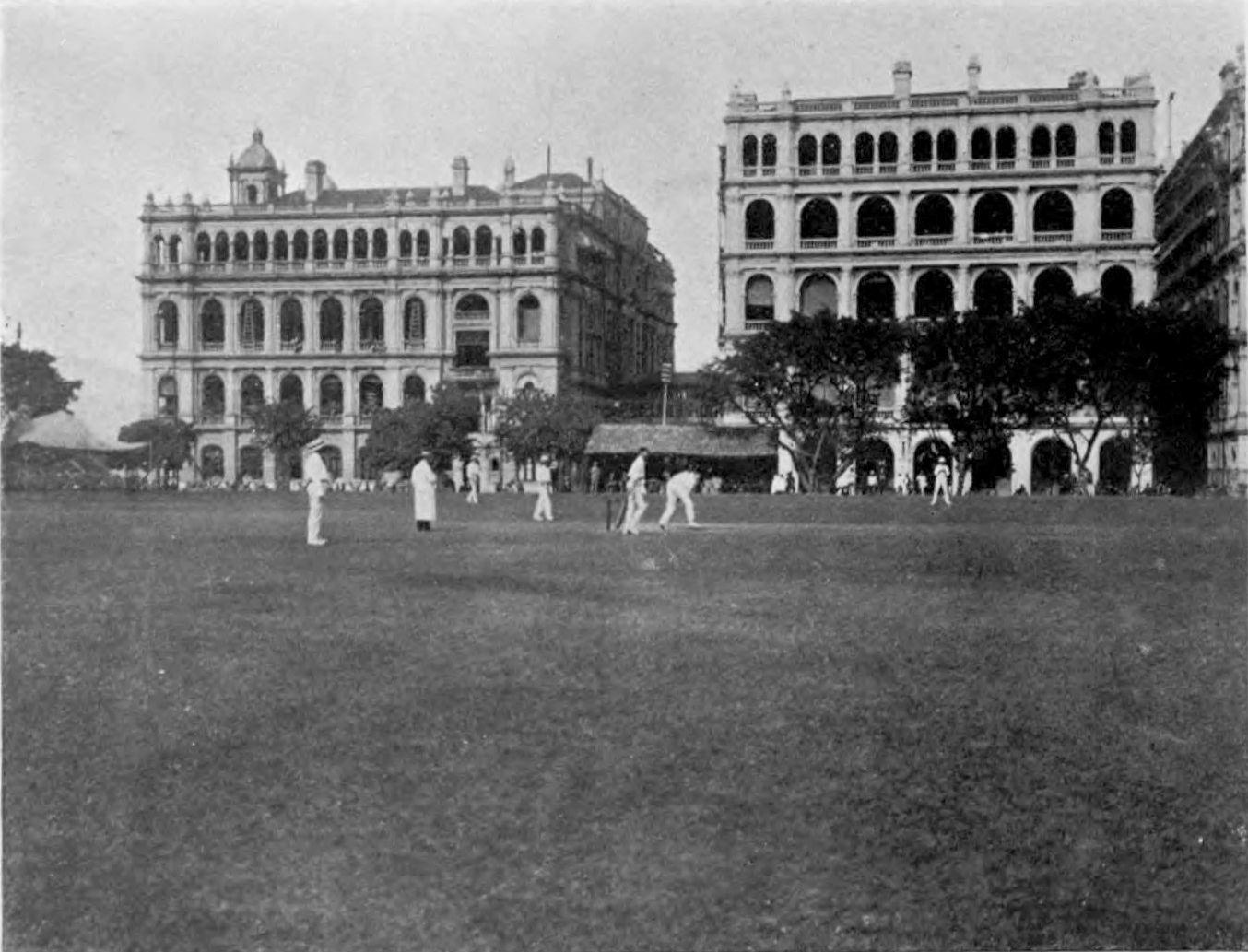
- Hong Kong Cricket Club in Central, in the 1900s. The site is now the location of Chater Garden
- Country: Hong Kong
- Governing body: Cricket Hong Kong
- National team: Hong Kong national cricket team
- First played: 1969

National competitions
- List: Hong Kong Cricket Sixes; Hong Kong Premier League Two-Day; Hong Kong Premier League One-Day Tournament; Hong Kong T20 Blitz

International competitions
- List: ICC Cricket World Cup: 0; ICC World Twenty20: 0; ICC Champions Trophy: 0; Under 19 Cricket World Cup: 0; Women's Cricket World Cup: 0

Cricket has been played in Hong Kong since at least 1841. Like most cricketing nations, it was part of the British Empire. The national cricket team has been active since 1866, and the Hong Kong Cricket Association was granted associate membership of the International Cricket Council (ICC) in 1969. The national team have played four matches with One Day International status, but have never been granted Test match status. Each year, Hong Kong hosts the Hong Kong Cricket Sixes, an ICC sanctioned event that features teams of six players in a six over competition.

== History ==
Hong Kong became a colony of the British Empire after the First Opium War (1839–42), and it was around this time that the first recorded cricket match was played in the colony; in 1841. Ten years later, the Hong Kong Cricket Club was formed, while in 1866, Interport matches were established against Shanghai. In 1890, a further series of matches were started, against The Straits, and Ceylon. Two years after this, the Hong Kong cricket team was returning from one such match against Shanghai, when the ship they were travelling on, the SS Bokhara, was caught in a typhoon, and sank. All but two members of the cricket team, along with 114 others, drowned.

An organised domestic cricket league was first established in the 1903–04 season, and was won during its inaugural year by the Army Ordnance Corps. In 1966, the Marylebone Cricket Club (MCC) visited Hong Kong for the first time, on their return from a tour of Australia and New Zealand. The Hong Kong Cricket Association was granted associate membership of the International Cricket Council (ICC) in 1969, and a few years later, the domestic structure was altered, with the First and Second Division being replaced with Sunday and Saturday Leagues, respectively.

In 1982, the Hong Kong national cricket team made they first appearance in the ICC Trophy, and finished fifth in their group of eight, recording two wins, against Israel, and Gibraltar. Interport matches continued until 1987, when the final one was played, against Singapore. In 1992, the first Hong Kong Cricket Sixes tournament was contested, and was won by Pakistan. By finishing as runners-up in the 2000 ACC Trophy, Hong Kong qualified for the 2004 Asia Cup. At the 2004 competition, Hong Kong played their first One Day International (ODI) matches, suffering heavy losses to Bangladesh and Pakistan. Later in 2004, a Saturday League match had to be cancelled, because Hussain Butt may have posed "a danger to passing traffic" during an innings of 311 not out, in which he hit 36 sixes. After finishing as runners-up in the 2006 ACC Trophy, Hong Kong once again qualified for the Asia Cup, where in the 2008 tournament, they once again lost heavily twice, against Pakistan and India.

Cricket is now one of the fastest growing sports in Hong Kong. The game is spreading beyond the Sub Continent or English origin population and many Chinese are also taking up the sport. In a few years it is expected to make some good strides.

== Domestic cricket ==
Typically, cricket is played between September and April in Hong Kong, during the cooler months of the year. There are only three grass pitches in the territory, with the rest of the grounds using artificial wickets. The top-level of the domestic cricket is the Sunday League, which consists of 50 over cricket contested by eleven teams. A Saturday League is also played, in which nineteen teams play 35 over matches.
