= 2010 Hong Kong Sixes =

Hong Kong Cricket Sixes 2010
- Administrator: International Cricket Council
- Cricket format: Six-a-side
- Tournament format(s): Round-robin and Knockout
- Champions: Australia (1st title)
- Participants: 8
- Official website: http://www.cricket.com.hk

The 2010 Hong Kong Cricket Sixes officially known as Karp Group & PC Jeweller Hong Kong Cricket Sixes was the sixteenth edition of the tournament, taking place at Kowloon Cricket Club, Hong Kong. Eight teams competed in the tournament which lasted over two days, 6 – 7 November 2010. The tournament also featured China for the first time playing an exhibition match with a Hong Kong development team. The tournament was won by Australia who defeated Pakistan in the final.

== Squads ==
=== Sir Donald Bradman Group ===
==== Hong Kong ====
- Najeeb Amar
- Hussain Butt
- Irfan Ahmed
- Munir Dar
- Tanvir Afzal
- Peter Wooden
- Aizaz Khan

==== England ====
- Rory Hamilton-Brown
- Darren Stevens
- Peter Trego
- Rikki Clarke
- Jos Buttler
- Chris Nash
- Steven Croft

==== Australia ====
- Daniel Christian
- Tom Cooper
- Tim Armstrong
- Matthew Johnston
- Glenn Maxwell
- Will Sheridan
- Ryan Carters
- David Warner

==== South Africa ====
- Shane Burger
- David Wiese
- Adrian McLaren
- Shaheen Khan
- Andrew Birch
- Keshav Maharaj
- Godfrey Stevens

=== Sir Garfield Sobers Group ===
==== India ====
- Anil Kumble
- Rohan Gavaskar
- Stuart Binny
- Bharat Chipli
- Balachandra Akhil
- Reetinder Singh Sodhi
- Sridharan Sriram

==== Sri Lanka ====
- Jeevantha Kulatunga
- Indika de Saram
- Kaushalya Weeraratne
- Dilhara Lokuhettige
- Chinthaka Jayasinghe
- Dilruwan Perera
- Kosala Kulasekera

==== Pakistan ====
- Shoaib Malik
- Imran Nazir
- Shoaib Khan
- Ahmed Shehzad
- Asad Ali
- Sohail Khan

==== New Zealand ====
- Scott Styris
- Daryl Tuffey
- Nathan McCullum
- Carl Frauenstein
- Logan van Beek
- Harry Boam
- Kieran Noema-Barnett
