= 2012 Hong Kong Sixes =

Hong Kong Cricket Sixes 2012
- Administrator: International Cricket Council
- Cricket format: Six-a-side
- Tournament format(s): Round-robin and Knockout
- Champions: South Africa (4th title)
- Runners-up: Pakistan
- Participants: 8
- Matches: 22
- Player of the series: (Pakistan) Umar Akmal
- Most runs: (Pakistan) Umar Akmal (201)
- Most wickets: (South Africa) Lyall Meyer (7)
- Official website: http://www.cricket.com.hk

The 2012 Hong Kong Cricket Sixes was the eighteenth edition of the Hong Kong Cricket Sixes, took place at Kowloon Cricket Club, Hong Kong. Eight teams competing in the tournament which lasted over two days from 27 to 28 October 2012. The tournament also featured China cricket team playing an exhibition match with a Hong Kong development team. The previous tournament was won by Pakistan who defeated England in the final.

== Squads ==
Pool A
Australia	England	Hong Kong	South Africa
Brad Hodge (c); Tim Armstrong; Ryan Carters; Cameron Borgas; Meyrick Buchanan; Theo Doropoulos; Steve Paulsen	Josh Cobb (c); Adam Ball; Keith Barker; Ben Brown; Chris Nash; Tom Smith; Ross Whiteley	James Atkinson (c); Tanwir Afzal; Irfan Ahmed; Munir Dar; Babar Hayat; Nizakat Khan; Aizaz Khan	Colin Ingram (c); Dillon du Preez; Robbie Frylinck; Lyall Meyer; David Miller; Wayne Parnell; Khayelihle Zondo
Pool B
Pakistan	India	Sri Lanka	Netherlands
Kamran Akmal (c); Tanvir Ahmed; Umar Akmal; Hammad Azam; Junaid Khan; Yasir Shah; Awais Zia	Shafiq Khan (c); Amit Uniyal; Ankur Sharma; Dharmender Phagna; Kinchit Shah; Mirnal Saini; Neeraj Chauhan; Sumit Abbi	Chamara Kapugedera (c); Kosala Kulasekara; Jehan Mubarak; Kaushal Lokuarachchi; Kusal Matharage Don; Sachith Pathirana; Ramith Rambukwella	Wesley Barresi (c); Peter Borren; Mudassar Bukhari; Peter Drinnen; Alexei Kervezee; Stephan Myburgh; Pieter Seelaar; Michael Swart

== Rules and regulations ==
All standard laws of the game as laid down by the MCC applied with the following significant differences:

=== General ===
Games are played between two teams of six players, and consist of five overs of six balls, with the exception of the final which consists of five overs of eight balls. Each member of the fielding team, with the exception of the wicket-keeper shall bowl one over. Wides and no-balls count as two runs to the batting team, plus an extra ball.

=== Last man stands ===
If five wickets fall (not including batsmen retiring not out) before the allocated overs have been completed, the remaining batsman continues, with the last batsman out remaining as a runner. The not out batsman shall always face strike, and shall be declared out if his partner is declared out.

=== Batsman retire ===
A batsman must retire not out on reaching 31 runs, but not before. He may complete all runs scored on the ball on which he reaches his 31, and retire immediately after. If one of the last pair of batsmen is out, any remaining not out batsman may resume his innings. In the case where there is more than one, they must return in the order they retired.

== Fixtures and results ==
All times shown are in Hong Kong Time (UTC+08:00).

=== Group stage ===
==== Pool A ====
Team	Pld	W	L	Pts	RR*
Hong Kong	3	2	1	4	3.2889
South Africa	3	2	1	4	3.1205
England	3	1	2	2	3.0610
Australia	3	1	2	2	2.7222

- *Runs per legitimate ball faced (i.e. excludes wides and no-balls)

27 October
08:30
scorecard

Hong Kong; 134/1 (5 overs)	v	Australia; 67/4 (5 overs)

Hong Kong won by 67 runs
Kowloon Cricket Club, Hong Kong

- Australia won the toss and elected to field

27 October
10:00
scorecard

Hong Kong; 84/2 (5 overs)	v	South Africa; 90/2 (3.5 overs)

South Africa won by 4 wickets
Kowloon Cricket Club, Hong Kong

- South Africa won the toss and elected to field

27 October
11:30
scorecard

Australia; 86/4 (5 overs)	v	England; 88/0 (3.4 overs)

England won by 6 wickets
Kowloon Cricket Club, Hong Kong

- England won the toss and elected to field

27 October
13:00
scorecard

Australia; 91/2 (5 overs)	v	South Africa; 56 (4.1 overs)

Australia won by 35 runs
Kowloon Cricket Club, Hong Kong

- South Africa won the toss and elected to field

27 October
14:30
scorecard

Hong Kong; 78 (5 overs)	v	England; 71/3 (5 overs)

Hong Kong won by 7 runs
Kowloon Cricket Club, Hong Kong

- England won the toss and elected to field

27 October
16:00
scorecard

South Africa; 113/1 (5 overs)	v	England; 92/3 (5 overs)

South Africa won by 21 runs
Kowloon Cricket Club, Hong Kong

- England won the toss and elected to field

==== Pool B ====
Team	Pld	W	L	Pts	RR*
Sri Lanka	3	3	0	6	3.3333
Pakistan	3	2	1	4	3.3239
India	3	1	2	2	2.2889
Netherlands	3	0	3	0	2.6222

- *Runs per legitimate ball faced (i.e. excludes wides and no-balls)

27 October
09:15
scorecard

India; 69/3 (5 overs)	v	Netherlands; 60/4 (5 overs)

India won 9 runs
Kowloon Cricket Club, Hong Kong

- India won the toss and elected to bat

27 October
10:45
scorecard

Sri Lanka; 107/0 (5 overs)	v	Netherlands; 104/0 (5 overs)

Sri Lanka won by 3 runs
Kowloon Cricket Club, Hong Kong

- Sri Lanka won the toss and elected to bat

27 October
12:15
scorecard

Netherlands; 73/4 (5 overs)	v	Pakistan; 78/0 (3.2 overs)

Pakistan won by 6 wickets
Kowloon Cricket Club, Hong Kong

- Netherlands won the toss and elected to bat

27 October
13:45
scorecard

Sri Lanka; 104/2 (5 overs)	v	India; 67/4 (5 overs)

Sri Lanka won by 37 runs
Kowloon Cricket Club, Hong Kong

- Sri Lanka won the toss and elected to bat

27 October
15:15
scorecard

India; 70/3 (5 overs)	v	Pakistan; 73/1 (3.3 overs)

Pakistan won by 5 wickets
Kowloon Cricket Club, Hong Kong

- India won the toss and elected to bat

27 October
16:45
scorecard

Pakistan; 85 (4.3 overs)	v	Sri Lanka; 89/3 (5 overs)

Sri Lanka won by 3 wickets
Kowloon Cricket Club, Hong Kong

- Sri Lanka won the toss and elected to field

=== Plate Knockout stage ===
Plate Semi-finals
A3	Australia	105/2 (5 overs)
B4	India	89/4 (5 overs)
B3	England	86/1 (5 overs)
A4	Netherlands	100/2 (5 overs)

Plate Finals
PSF1	Australia	79/0 (3.2 overs)
PSF2	Netherlands	78/4 (5 overs)

==== Plate Semi-finals ====
28 October
08:30
scorecard

Australia; 105/2 (5 overs)	v	India; 89/4 (5 overs)

Australia won by 16 runs
Kowloon Cricket Club, Hong Kong

- Australia won the toss and elected to bat

28 October
10:45
scorecard

Netherlands; 100/2 (5 overs)	v	England; 86/1 (5 overs)

Netherlands won by 14 runs
Kowloon Cricket Club, Hong Kong

- England won the toss and elected to field

==== Plate Final ====
28 October
15:15
scorecard

Netherlands; 78/5 (5 overs)	v	Australia; 79/0 (3.2 overs)
Wesley Barresi 34 (10); Cameron Borgas 2/8 (1 overs)		Steve Paulsen 34** (7); Alexei Kervezee 0/6 (0.2 overs)

Australia won by 6 wickets
Kowloon Cricket Club, Hong Kong
Umpires: Zubair Nizami and Anoop Gidwani

- Netherlands won the toss and elected to bat

=== Cup Round Robin stage ===
Team	Pld	W	L	Pts	RR*
South Africa	3	3	0	6	3.1852
Pakistan	3	2	1	4	3.2949
Hong Kong	3	1	2	2	3.3563
Sri Lanka	3	0	3	0	3.1278

- *Run-rate carries over from the first day's play.

28 October
09:15
scorecard

Pakistan; 81/1 (5 overs)	v	South Africa; 84/4 (5 overs)

South Africa won by 2 wickets
Kowloon Cricket Club, Hong Kong

- Pakistan won the toss and elected to field

28 October
10:10
scorecard

Sri Lanka; 96/2 (5 overs)	v	Hong Kong; 100/0 (4 overs)

Hong Kong won by 6 wickets
Kowloon Cricket Club, Hong Kong

- Hong Kong won the toss and elected to field

28 October
11:30
scorecard

Pakistan; 95/3 (5 overs)	v	Hong Kong; 93/5 (5 overs)

Pakistan won by 2 runs
Kowloon Cricket Club, Hong Kong

- Hong Kong won the toss and elected to field

28 October
12:15
scorecard

Sri Lanka; 70/5 (5 overs)	v	South Africa; 74/1 (3.4 overs)

South Africa won by 5 wickets
Kowloon Cricket Club, Hong Kong

- South Africa won the toss and elected to field

28 October
13:40
scorecard

Hong Kong; 95/1 (5 overs)	v	South Africa; 99/2 (4.3 overs)

South Africa won by 4 wickets
Kowloon Cricket Club, Hong Kong

- South Africa won the toss and elected to field

28 October
14:30
scorecard

Sri Lanka; 97/4 (5 overs)	v	Pakistan; 102/1 (4.1 overs)

Pakistan won by 5 wickets
Kowloon Cricket Club, Hong Kong

- Pakistan won the toss and elected to field

=== Final ===
28 October
17:00
scorecard

South Africa; 142/2 (5 overs)	v	Pakistan; 105 (4.1 overs)
Colin Ingram 34** (6); Awais Zia 2/20 (1 overs)		Umar Akmal 51 (15); Lyall Meyer 1/0 (0.1 overs)

South Africa won by 37 runs
Kowloon Cricket Club, Hong Kong
Umpires: Clive Howard and Michael Walsh

- Pakistan won the toss and elected to field

== Notes ==
- ** is used to signify that a batsman was forced to retire not out as his personal score was 31 or more.
