= Munir Ahmed Dar =

Munir Ahmed Dar may refer to

- Munir Dar (cricketer) (born 1974), cricketer from Hong Kong
- Munir Dar (field hockey) (born 1935), Pakistani field hockey player
