= Marti Anderson =

Marti Anderson may refer to:

- Marti Anderson (politician) (born 1951), American politician
- Marti Anderson (statistician), New Zealand academic

== See also ==
- Martin Anderson (disambiguation)
