= Mark Wright (cricketer) =

Personal information
- Full name: Mark James William Wright
- Born: 1 February 1981 (age 45); Edmonton, London, England
- Batting: Right-handed
- Bowling: Right-arm off break

International information
- National side: Hong Kong (2014)

Domestic team information
- Years: Team
- 2005–2006 & 2008: Buckinghamshire
- 2001: Middlesex Cricket Board

Career statistics
| Competition | LA |
|---|---|
| Matches | 5 |
| Runs scored | 26 |
| Batting average | 6.50 |
| 100s/50s | –/– |
| Top score | 12* |
| Balls bowled | 96 |
| Wickets | 2 |
| Bowling average | 31.00 |
| 5 wickets in innings | – |
| 10 wickets in match | – |
| Best bowling | 1/13 |
| Catches/stumpings | 1/– |
- Source: Cricinfo, 5 May 2017

Mark James William Wright (born 1 February 1981) is a cricketer who represents the Hong Kong national team. Wright is a right-handed batsman who bowls right-arm off break. He was born in Edmonton, London.

Wright represented the Middlesex Cricket Board in a single List A match against Berkshire in the 2001 Cheltenham & Gloucester Trophy. In his only List A match he scored 5 runs and with the ball he took a single wicket at a cost of 13 runs.

In 2005, he played his only Minor Counties Championship match for Buckinghamshire against Cumberland. The following season he made his debut for the county in the MCCA Knockout Trophy against Cambridgeshire. Two years later, he played his second and final Trophy match for the county against Dorset.

In 2009, he represented Hong Kong in the 2009 Hong Kong Cricket Sixes, playing matches against South Africa, New Zealand, England and Sri Lanka. Being 5 overs per innings matches, these games therefore held no official status. He also represented Hong Kong in official List A matches at the 2014 World Cup Qualifier.
