= Dharmender Phagna =

Indian cricketer (born 1984)

Personal information
- Born: 29 September 1984 (age 42); Faridabad, Haryana, India
- Role: Wicket-keeper

Domestic team information
- Years: Team
- Haryana cricket team

Career statistics
Competition	First-class
Matches	1
Runs scored	54
Batting average	54.00
100s/50s	0/1
Top score	54
Catches/stumpings	4/3
- Source: ESPNcricinfo, 24 December 2017

Dharmender Phagna (born 29 September 1984) is an Indian first-class cricketer who has played for Haryana cricket team in a single first-class cricket match.

He was also the member of the Indian cricket team at the 2012 Hong Kong Cricket Sixes
