= Steve Paulsen =

Australian cricketer (born 1981)

Personal information
- Full name: Steven James Paulsen
- Born: 3 September 1981 (age 45); Ipswich, Queensland, Australia
- Role: All-rounder

Domestic team information
- Years: Team
- 2005/06–2011/12: Queensland
- 2011/12: Brisbane Heat

Career statistics
| Competition | FC | LA | T20 |
|---|---|---|---|
| Matches | 3 | 9 | 5 |
| Runs scored | 135 | 141 | 111 |
| Batting average | 33.75 | 15.66 | 37.00 |
| 100s/50s | 0/1 | 0/0 | 0/0 |
| Top score | 90* | 36 | 45 |
| Balls bowled | 30 | 79 | – |
| Wickets | 0 | 2 | – |
| Bowling average | – | 42.50 | – |
| 5 wickets in innings | – | 0 | – |
| 10 wickets in match | – | – | – |
| Best bowling | – | 2/19 | – |
| Catches/stumpings | 1/– | 4/– | 1/– |
- Source: Cricinfo, 24 December 2017

Steven James Paulsen (born 3 September 1981) is an Australian cricketer who played for Queensland between the 2005/06 and 2011/12 seasons. He also played for Brisbane Heat franchise at the 2011–12 Big Bash League season

Steve Paulsen was a member of the Australian cricket team at the 2012 Hong Kong Cricket Sixes. He also scored an unbeaten knock of 35 runs to secure a win for Australia in the plate cup final against Netherlands at the 2012 Hong Kong Cricket Sixes.
