= Dene Hills =

Australian cricketer

Personal information
- Full name: Dene Fleetwood Hills
- Born: 27 August 1970 (age 56); Wynyard, Tasmania, Australia
- Batting: Left-handed
- Bowling: Left-arm slow
- Role: Opening Batsman

Domestic team information
- Years: Team
- 1991/92–2001/02: Tasmania
- 2000: Scotland

Career statistics
Competition	FC	List A
Matches	112	47
Runs scored	7,894	1,239
Batting average	40.07	30.97
100s/50s	21/43	0/8
Top score	265	81
Balls bowled	97	30
Wickets	2	0
Bowling average	26.50	–
5 wickets in innings	0	–
10 wickets in match	0	–
Best bowling	2/20	–
Catches/stumpings	80/–	14/–
- Source: Cricinfo, 9 December 2008

Dene Fleetwood Hills (born 27 August 1970) is an Australian former first-class cricketer who played for the Tasmanian Tigers. He was a left-handed top order batsman, who spent much of his career opening the batting alongside Jamie Cox. He is regarded by some peers and opponents as one of the better players never to have played test cricket. He currently works as a performance analyst for the Australia national cricket team.

== Early life ==
Dene Hills grew up in Wynyard, Tasmania, where he soon showed the talent that would lead him on to represent his state in first-class cricket.

== First-class career ==
By the time he had finished school, Hills had already given indication of the talent he possessed. A gifted batsman with a strong defence, he showed a natural preference for off-side play, and could cut and drive elegantly.

After attending the Australian Cricket Academy in 1989, Dene Hills made his debut for Tasmania against Western Australia at Hobart in the summer of 1991–92. Hills had limited success in List A cricket, but truly shone as a batsman in the Sheffield Shield.

He quickly established himself at the top of the order at a time when Tasmania was re-organising itself into a competitive side. He soon formed a strong friendship with fellow opener Jamie Cox, and the pair blossomed into one of Tasmania's best opening partnerships of all time. The pair formed one of the most consistent domestic partnerships of the 1990s, and Hills defensive strength was the perfect foil for Cox's more attacking flair.

He brought up the first of his 21 first-class centuries with a mature-looking 106 against a vastly experienced Queensland side in his debut season, and the following year, 1992–93, he added four more tons at a season average of 50.16. He topped Tasmania's run charts for the 1993–94 season, and his 1,068 runs at 48.54 helped to guide the Tigers into their first-ever Shield final. Their inexperienced side were unable to win on that occasion, but the strong team-ethos of that period helped to build the platform that would lead to later success.

Hills had quickly settled into his role as the mainstay at the top order, and as he matured as a player, he learned to build ever larger innings. In the 1995–96 season he scored his first double-century against a Queensland bowling attack that featured the international veterans, Carl Rackemann, Michael Kasprowicz and Craig McDermott, all of whom he seemed at ease when facing during that epic innings. The following season, 1997–98, Hills was in the form of his life, and he scored two more double-centuries back-to-back; 205 against the Victorian Bushrangers, and then his career best 265 in the next match against Southern Redbacks. The two mammoth innings helped him to compile 1,220 runs for the season and again guide the Tigers to the Shield final. The tally also earned him the 1997–98 Sheffield Shield Cricket of the Year award.

Hills came closest to receiving international honours following that brilliant season when he was selected for an Australia A tour of Scotland and Ireland. He made a dashing 118 in the opening match against Scotland, which was his highest-ever limited-overs score, but regrettably the match was not afforded official List-A status, and so Hills ended his career without an official limited-overs century to his name.

In the 1999–2000, and 2000–01 seasons, Hills' form slumped dramatically, with his season average ending below 25.00 for the first time in both campaigns. in the 2000–01 season, he was dropped after just four matches, and after an illustrious decade leading the Tigers from the front, Dene Hills bowed out of First-class cricket with scores of 5 and 3 in his final two innings. Hills finished his first-class career with 7,894 runs at an average of 40.07 with a highest score of 265.

As his playing career wound up, Hills also found time to represent Australia in 2001 in the Hong Kong Sixes competition in Kowloon, scoring the most runs in that year's tournament.

== Later life ==
Following his career as a player, Hills moved into cricket coaching and spent time as an assistant coach with both the Tigers, and then the Australian national team. He also spent time working for the Cricket Centre of Excellence. In August 2008, he was named as a batting coach for the England and Wales Cricket Board. But in December 2010, during the 2010–11 Ashes series, he rejoined Australia as a performance analyst.
