= Martin Andersen =

Martin Andersen may refer to:

- Martin Andersen (footballer) (born 1986), Danish footballer
- Martin Adolf Andersen (1844–1927), Norwegian politician
- Martin Andersen Nexø (1869–1954), Danish writer
- Martin Erik Andersen (born 1964), Danish sculptor
- Martin Hoel Andersen (born 1995), Norwegian footballer
- Martin Masai Andersen (born 1972), Danish photographer, art director, designer and educator, based in London
- Martin Stig Andersen (born 1973), Danish composer and sound designer
- MrSavage (Martin Foss Andersen, born 2004), Norwegian gamer and streamer
- Florida State Road 528, also known as Martin Andersen Beachline Expressway

== See also ==
- Martin Anderson (disambiguation)
- Martin Andersson (disambiguation)
