= Benji Floros =

Australian cricketer

Personal information
- Full name: Benji Con Floros
- Born: 1 March 1998 (age 28); Canberra, Australia
- Height: 195 cm (6 ft 5 in)
- Batting: Right-handed
- Bowling: Right-arm fast
- Relatives: Jason Floros (brother)

Domestic team information
- Years: Team
- 2024/25–present: Queensland (squad no. 25)
- 2026: Surrey

Career statistics
| Competition | FC | LA |
|---|---|---|
| Matches | 3 | 8 |
| Runs scored | 47 | 48 |
| Batting average | – | 9.60 |
| 100s/50s | 0/0 | 0/0 |
| Top score | 26* | 22 |
| Balls bowled | 312 | 396 |
| Wickets | 5 | 14 |
| Bowling average | 38.40 | 30.14 |
| 5 wickets in innings | 0 | 0 |
| 10 wickets in match | 0 | 0 |
| Best bowling | 2/52 | 4/22 |
| Catches/stumpings | 1/– | 3/– |
- Source: ESPNcricinfo, 11 August 2026

Benji Con Floros (born 1 March 1998) is an Australian cricketer who plays for Queensland, and also plays for Surrey, playing in the One Day Cup. He plays as a right-arm fast-medium bowler and right-handed batter.

== Career ==
Floros firstly contracted for Queensland for the 2020–21 season. He also played 2nd XI cricket for Australian Capital Territory (ACT) and New South Wales (NSW). His older brother Jason played Sheffield Shield and One-Day cricket for Queensland between 2010 and 2017 and in the BBL for the Sydney Thunder and Brisbane Heat. His another brother Tim played some local tournament along with him and their cousins Alexander and Jake and uncle Billy.

On 1 November 2024, Floros made his first-class debut against New South Wales during the 2024–25 Sheffield Shield season. On 21 July 2026, he made his debut for Surrey in the One Day Cup, against Lancashire.
