= Amit Uniyal =

Indian first-class cricketer (born 1981)

Personal information
- Full name: Amit Uniyal
- Born: 21 November 1981 (age 44); Chandigarh, Punjab, India
- Batting: Left-handed
- Bowling: Left-arm fast-medium

Domestic team information
- Years: Team
- 2001/02–2010/11: Punjab
- 2010: Rajasthan Royals

Career statistics
Competition	FC	LA	T20
Matches	28	46	3
Runs scored	760	320	18
Batting average	23.03	17.77	18.00
100s/50s	0/3	0/0	0/0
Top score	68	49*	14*
Balls bowled	4,913	1,854	60
Wickets	89	50	5
Bowling average	29.38	28.74	17.60
5 wickets in innings	3	0	0
10 wickets in match	0	0	0
Best bowling	6/92	3/16	3/22
Catches/stumpings	9/–	9/–	0/–
- Source: ESPNcricinfo, 13 March 2010

Amit Uniyal is an Indian first-class cricketer. An all rounder, he played for Punjab in first-class cricket, and for Rajasthan Royals in the Indian Premier League.

A left-handed all-rounder, Uniyal made his debut in 2001–02 for Punjab. A seamer, Uniyal has picked up 89 wickets in first-class cricket and has scored 760 runs at an average of just over 23.

== Domestic career ==
Amit Uniyal made his Ranji Trophy debut in 2001–2002 against Himachal at PCA stadium Mohali, taking 6 wickets and scoring 57 runs in the match.

He played 4 matches in his debut year and got 20 wickets. And played Ranjii Trophy until the year 2010/2011. In the year 2003 he got selected in Duleep trophy in which he got 13 wickets in 3 matches. His highlighting feature were 6 wickets in 1st match. He played Deodhar trophy from 2002 to 2004. in the year 2003, he got selected in Board president XL Team against Touring New Zealand Team. In the same year he was called for India camp held in Bangalore.

== Indian Premier League ==
Signed by the Rajasthan Royals early in 2010 after the unauthorised Indian Cricket League folded and ended his employment, he made his debut against Mumbai Indians on 13 March 2010. He bowled 4 overs for 41 runs, taking two wickets including that of Sanath Jayasuriya.
