= Hong Kong T20 Blitz =

Hong Kong T20 Blitz 香港快閃板球賽 (Chinese)
- Hong Kong T20 Blitz Logo
- Countries: Hong Kong
- Administrator: Cricket Hong Kong
- Format: Twenty20
- First edition: 2016
- Latest edition: 2018
- Tournament format: Round-robin and finals
- Number of teams: 5
- Most successful: Kowloon Cantons (2 titles)
- Most runs: Kumar Sangakkara (431)
- Most wickets: Imran Arif (15)
- TV: List of broadcasters
- Website: Hong Kong T20 Blitz

The Hong Kong T20 Blitz was a cricket competition in Hong Kong that was first played in 2016. The inaugural event consisted of four franchised teams playing in a Twenty20 format only. Kowloon Cantons and Woodworm Island Warriors were joint winners of the inaugural DTC Hong Kong T20 Blitz after rain washed out finals day.

In July 2019, the competition was cancelled, due to ongoing financial issues.

== History ==
The Cricket Hong Kong (CHK) announced their plans for the event in April 2016, stating they would invest in a Twenty20 cricket league for the development cricket in Hong Kong as well as in nearby countries. The competition would launch with four teams playing in a Twenty20 format. Cricket Hong Kong announced that DTC Mobiles will sponsor the tournament. The Agence France-Presse said, "A burgeoning Twenty20 tournament and growing interest from abroad is turning Hong Kong into one of Asia's fastest-rising cricketing destinations – and could help the sport make inroads into mainland China."

Before the second season, Leonine Sports Group acquired the Woodworm Island Warriors, changing the name to Hong Kong Island (HKI) United. A new fifth franchise was also added and named City KaiTak.

== Teams ==
Cricket Hong Kong announced the four hosts for the Hong Kong T20 Blitz League in April 2016, with hosting rights awarded for the first years of the competition. Team names, along with the fixtures and venues for the 2016 season, were announced in April 2016. The allocation of domestic players was decided by a draft held on April 28, 2016. All four franchises also subsequently signed a number of international players. Tanwir Afzal, captain of the Hong Kong national cricket team, was selected as the first pick in the inaugural draft for tournament by Woodworm Island Warriors. Since 2017 a fifth team has been added & five Chinese players were taken up by the five franchises in their squad, although as of 2018 they are yet to be given any significant role or opportunity in the playing XI.

Team	City	Captain
Kowloon Cantons	Kowloon	Babar Hayat
Hung Hom JD Jaguars	Hung Hom	Kinchit Shah
Galaxy Gladiators Lantau	Lantau	Kumar Sangakkara
HK Island United	Hong Kong Island	Tanwir Afzal
City KaiTak	Kai Tak	Rayad Emrit

== Tournament results ==
Season	Final			Final venue	Number of teams	Player of the series
Season	Winner	Winning margin	Runner-up	Final venue	Number of teams	Player of the series
2016	HK Island Warriors and Kowloon Cantons declared co-champions after the final was abandoned			Mission Road Ground	4	–
2017	Kowloon Cantons	Won by 25 runs	City KaiTak	Mission Road Ground	5	Chris Jordan
2018	Hung Hom JD Jaguars	Won by 6 runs	Galaxy Gladiators Lantau	Mission Road Ground	5	Kumar Sangakkara

== Format ==
The 2016 event took place on 29 and 30 May. The four teams played each other once in a round-robin format, followed by a finals day. All the matches were played at Mission Road Ground, Mong Kok.

The 2017 event took place from 8 to 12 March. The five teams played each other once in a round-robin format, followed by a finals day. All the matches were played at the Mission Road Ground, Mong Kok.

== Media coverage ==
Coverage of Hong Kong T20 Blitz 2016 was broadcast live on Hong Kong Cricket Association’s YouTube channel. Dean Jones, Jack Richards and Fox Sports’ Katherine Loughnan were hosts and also part of the commentary team.

Territory	Network
United Kingdom	BT Sport
Australia	Fox Cricket
Arab world	OSN Sports
Asian Countries	Neo Sports
Caribbean	ESPN Caribbean
African countries	StarTimes
