= Michael Cranmer =

South Australian cricketer (born 1989)

Michael Robert Craig Cranmer (born 16 March 1989) is a South Australian cricketer. He was educated at St Peter's College, Adelaide where he excelled at cricket and was a regular member of the school's First XI. He is a right-handed batsman and bowls right arm medium-fast. He is currently playing A grade cricket for East Torrens. In 2008 he was called up for the under 19 Australian national squad to compete in the Under 19's World Cup where he was a valuable asset to the team. He has since been called up to the South Australian Redbacks squad for his first Sheffield Shield game on 13 February 2009 against the Queensland Bulls.

== See also ==
- List of South Australian representative cricketers
