= Martin Andersson =

Martin Andersson may refer to:

- Martin Andersson (cricketer) (born 1996), English cricketer
- Martin Andersson (footballer, born 1982), Swedish midfielder
- Martin Andersson (footballer, born 1981), Swedish defender for IF Elfsborg
- Martin Andersson (sailor) (born 1969), Swedish Olympic sailor
- Martin Andersson (actor) in Lotta på Bråkmakargatan

== See also ==
- Martin Anderson (disambiguation)
- Martin Andersen (disambiguation)
