= Somerley Capital =

Hong Kong investment banking firm

Somerley Capital Limited

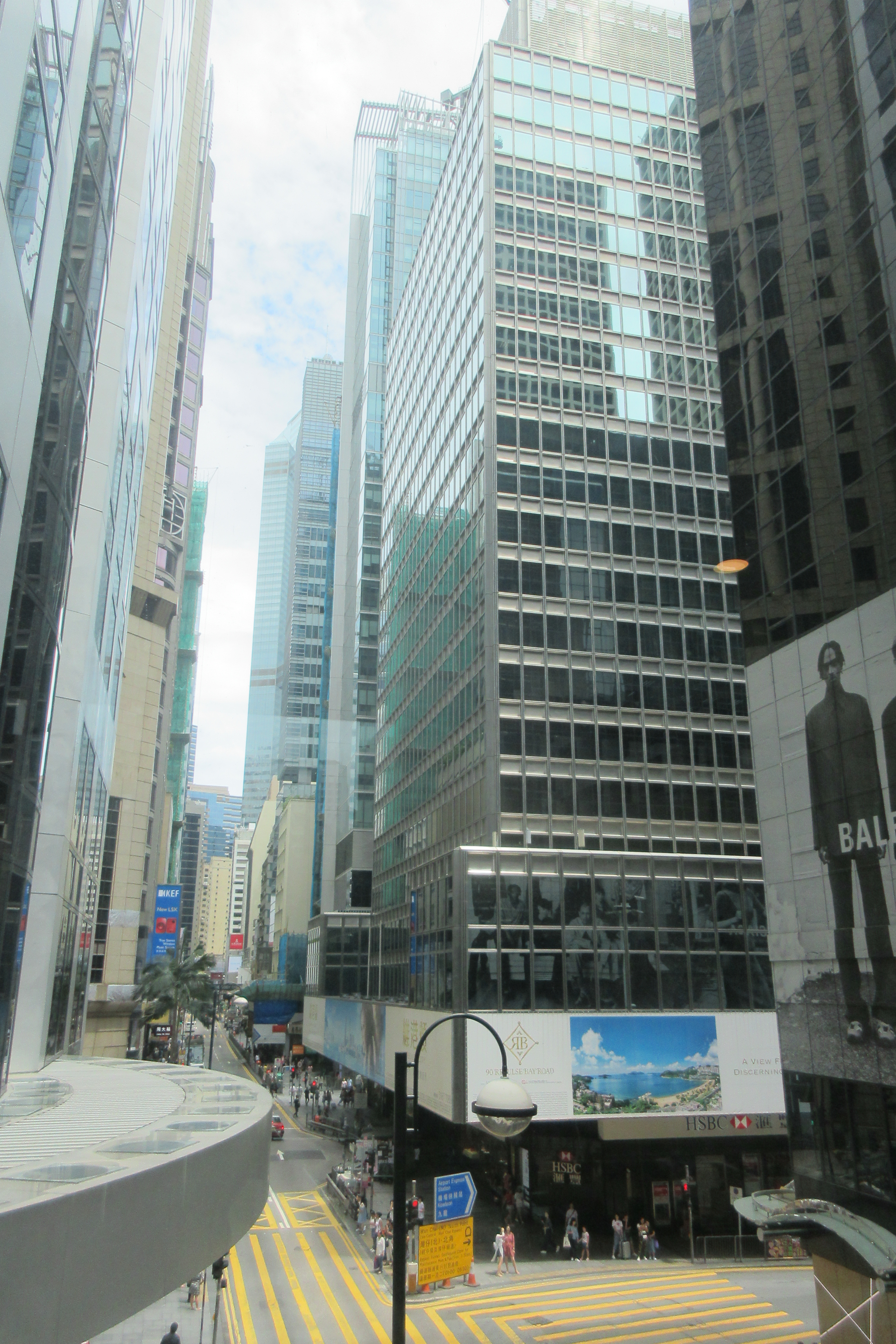
- Headquarters at 29 Queen's Road Central
- Native name: 新百利融資有限公司
- Company type: Public
- Traded as: SEHK: 8439
- Industry: Investment banking
- Founded: 1983; 43 years ago
- Founder: Martin Nevil Sabine
- Headquarters: Hong Kong
- Revenue: ▲HK$67.37 million (FY 2023)
- Net income: ▲HK$−3.61 million (FY 2023)
- Total assets: ▼HK$81.52 million (FY 2023)
- Total equity: ▼HK$78.52 million (FY 2023)
- Number of employees: ▼47 (FY 2023)
- Website: www.somerleycapital.com

Somerley Capital (Somerley) is an investment banking firm based in Hong Kong. The firm mainly provides corporate finance advisory services to clients. It also has acted as a sponsor to initial public offerings held in Hong Kong as well as managed and underwritten secondary equity issues.

== History ==
Somerley Capital was founded in 1983 by Martin Sabine. Sabine was previously a director in the corporate finance department of Wardley Limited, a subsidiary of HSBC.

Somerley Capital is considered one of Hong Kong's local firms that along with foreign banks used to rule the city's financial industry until the late 2010s where competition from China institutions caught up.

In March 2017, Somerley Capital held an initial public offering to list on the Growth Enterprise Market (GEM) board of Hong Kong Stock Exchange. Its price range was HK$1.4 to HK$2.3 per share and aimed to raise HK$80.5 million.

Somerley Capital is known as an independent financial advisor which despite being smaller compared to larger investment banks, has still managed to be involved in multiple large high-profile deals related to Hong Kong and China. According to Mergermarket League tables, Somerley Capital is usually ranked in the top 20 firms for Greater China deals by value with its 2021 rank being No. 10.

The firm is headquartered in Hong Kong with an additional office in Beijing.

== Notable deals ==
- Advised Citybus on its acquisition by the Stagecoach Group in July 1999 for £276m.
- Advised Hutchison Telecommunications International to delist from the Hong Kong Stock Exchange in a HK$4.2 billion deal in May 2010.
- Advised Alibaba Group to privatize its Alibaba.com unit from the Hong Kong Stock Exchange for US$2.5 billion in June 2012.
- Advised Huiyuan Juice to purchase a fruit juice concentrates supplier from controlling shareholder China Hui Yuan Juice Holdings Co Ltd for US$631 million in October 2013.
- Advised Citic Pacific to purchase the assets from its parent, CITIC Group worth US$36 billion in May 2014.
- Advised the Mongolian Mining Corporation on a US$195 million rights issue in November 2014.
- Advised Alibaba Pictures on acquiring Taobao Movie and Yulebao from its parent, Alibaba Group for US$520 million in November 2015.
- Acted as sponsor for the spin-off of Wharf Real Estate Investment Company from The Wharf in November 2017.
- Advised on the privatization of Chong Hing Bank from the Hong Kong Stock Exchange for HK$5.1 billion in September 2021.
- Advised ESR Group on its acquisition of ARA Asset Management for US$5.2 billion in January 2022.
