= Martin Anderson =

Martin Anderson may refer to:

- Martin Anderson (artist) (1854–1932), Scottish artist, political cartoonist, postcard illustrator, and publisher
- Martin Anderson (economist) (1936–2015), author and policy advisor to U.S. President Ronald Reagan
- Martin Brewer Anderson (1815–1890), American university president
- Martin Anderson (1992–2006), teenager who died of mistreatment by boot camp officers in Tampa, Florida, see death of Martin Anderson

== See also ==
- Martin Andersen (disambiguation)
- Martin Andersson (disambiguation)
