= Cricket Hong Kong, China =

Official governing body of cricket in Hong Kong

- Sport: Cricket
- Jurisdiction: Hong Kong
- Abbreviation: CHK
- Founded: 1968 as HKCA
- Affiliation: International Cricket Council
- Affiliation date: 1969
- Headquarters: Causeway Bay
- Location: Hong Kong Island
- Chairman: Burji Shroff
- Sponsor: The Caravel Foundation, EPIC Group, Gencor, Boase Cohen & Collins, Somerley Capital
- Replaced: Hong Kong Cricket Association

Official website
- www.hkcricket.org
- (Hong Kong)

Cricket Hong Kong, China (Chinese: 中國香港板球), previously known as the Hong Kong Cricket Association and Cricket Hong Kong (Chinese: 香港板球), is the official governing body of the sport of cricket in Hong Kong. Its current headquarters is in So Kon Po, Causeway Bay. Established as the Hong Kong Cricket Association in 1968, CHK is Hong Kong's representative at the International Cricket Council and is an associate member having been admitted as a member of that body since 1969. It is also a member of the Asian Cricket Council.

== History of Cricket in Hong Kong ==
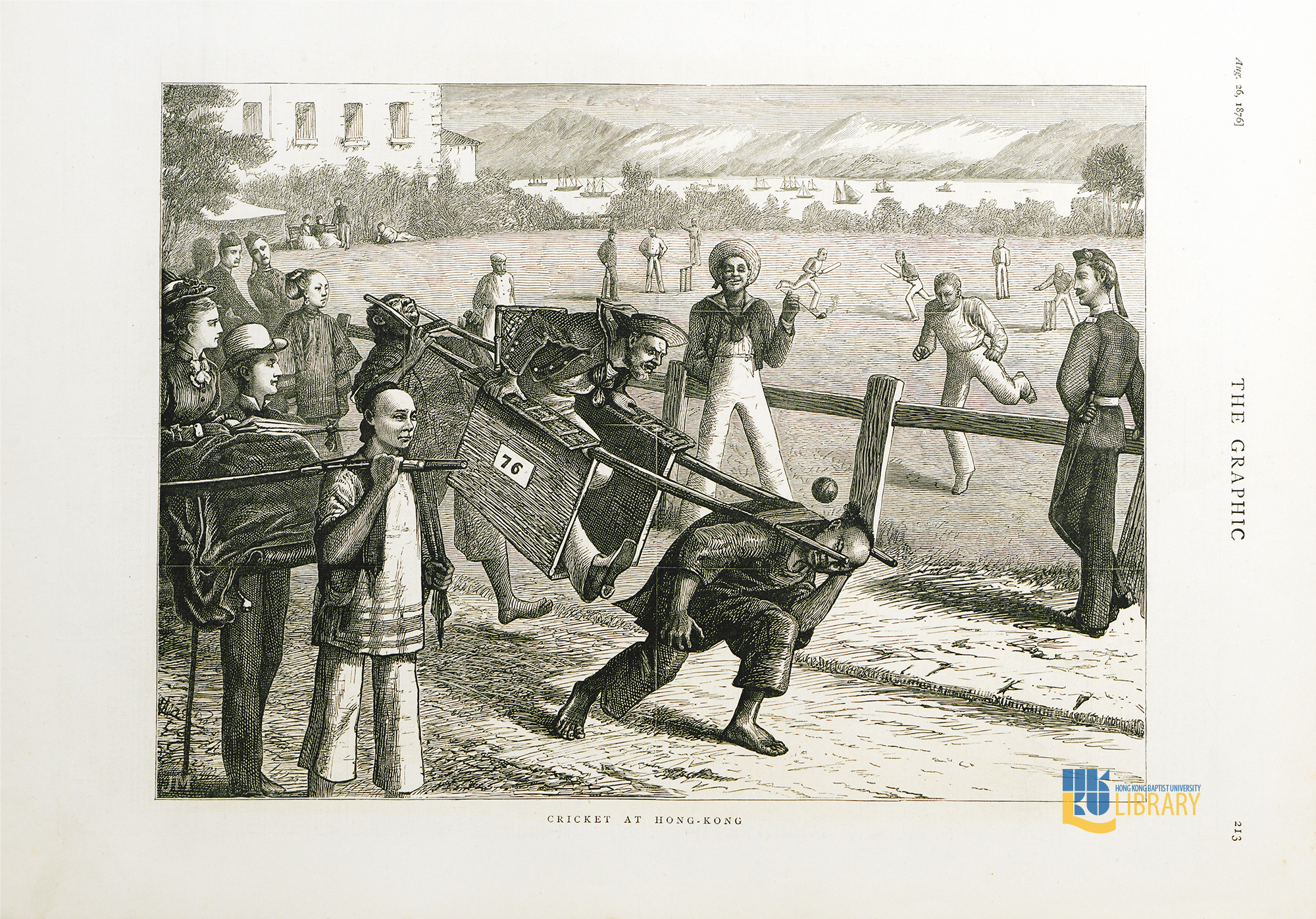
Cricket at Hong Kong, 1876

Hong Kong became a colony of the British Empire after the First Opium War (1839–42), and it was around this time that the first recorded cricket match was played in the colony, in 1841. Ten years later, the Hong Kong Cricket Club was formed, while in 1866, Interport matches were established against Shanghai. In 1890, a further series of matches were started, against The Straits, and Ceylon. Two years after this, the Hong Kong cricket team was returning from one such match against Shanghai, when the ship they were travelling on, the SS Bokhara, was caught in a typhoon, and sank on 10 October 1892. All but two members of the cricket team, along with 114 other passengers, drowned.

An organised domestic cricket league was first established in the 1903–04 season, and was won during its inaugural year by the Royal Army Ordnance Corps. A Second Division was introduced to lower level or newer clubs in 1921–22. In 1966, the Marylebone Cricket Club (MCC) visited Hong Kong for the first time, on their return from a tour of Australia and New Zealand. The Hong Kong Cricket Association was granted associate membership of the International Cricket Council (ICC) in 1969, and a few years later, the domestic structure was altered, with the First and Second Division being replaced with Sunday and Saturday Leagues, respectively.

In 1982, the Hong Kong national cricket team made their first appearance in the ICC Trophy, and finished fifth in their group of eight, recording two wins, against Israel, and Gibraltar. Interport matches continued until 1987, until the final one was played, against Singapore. In 1992, the first Hong Kong Cricket Sixes tournament was contested, and was won by Pakistan.

By finishing as runners-up in the 2000 ACC Trophy, Hong Kong qualified for the 2004 Asia Cup. At the 2004 competition, Hong Kong played their first One Day International (ODI) matches, suffering losses to Bangladesh and Pakistan. After finishing as runners-up in the 2006 ACC Trophy, Hong Kong once again qualified for the Asia Cup, where in the 2008 tournament, losing to Pakistan and India.

Hong Kong’s finest moment to date on the international stage came in 2014, with a win over ICC World T20 hosts Bangladesh in Chittagong. Since then Hong Kong have gone on to qualify for the ICC Intercontinental Cup and ICC World Cricket League Championships and have ODI status until at least the 2019 ICC World Cup.

During that period Hong Kong have notched their first One Day International and first-class victories and have reached as high as 10th in the world in T20 Internationals. This success extends to women's cricket, one example including the 2023 Hong Kong Women's Quadrangular Series when Kary Chan bowled a five-wicket haul versus international teams from Tanzania and Japan.

Cricket has become one of the fastest growing sports in Hong Kong. Participation in the sport has spread beyond the communities of sub-continent South Asian and British origin, with increasing interest from the local Chinese population. People have noted expectations of continued growth in the coming years.

== Rebranding ==
The HKCA rebranded as Cricket Hong Kong in 2016, as part of a strategy to secure more engagement from Hong Kongers. In 2023, its name was altered to "Cricket Hong Kong, China" in line with requirements from the Sports Federation and Olympic Committee of Hong Kong, China to add "China" to the name of sporting associations.

== Flagship events by Cricket Hong Kong ==
=== The Hong Kong Cricket Sixes ===
The Hong Kong Sixes are set to make a return in 2017, following a five-year absence from the international calendar. The iconic Hong Kong tournament played at Kowloon Cricket Club was first played in 1992, with the most recent edition taking place in 2025.

=== Hong Kong T20 Blitz ===
The Hong Kong T20 Blitz brings the world’s best short form players together with the premier local domestic cricket talent. There is also a focus on developing Associate Cricket, with each team required to select at least one overseas player from a non-full member nation. A total of five overseas players per team will be permitted in the 2017 tournament, up from 3 in a playing XI in 2016.

The 2016 event was highlighted by the signing of World Cup-winning Captain Michael Clarke, who also spent time with Hong Kong’s national squad during his stay. His team the Kowloon Cantons were named joint winners with the Woodworm Island Warriors after rain washed out the final. Hung Hom JD Jaguars and Lantau GII Galaxy Riders were the other teams to compete in the inaugural tournament.

The full scale of success in the second edition of the DTC Hong Kong T20 Blitz has been revealed, following the release of figures from the live streaming coverage of the event. Full data collected from the tournament generated 11.8 million views across Facebook and YouTube over the five days, obliterating last year's 51,000 over two days and the anticipated target of 1 million. Over 8.4 million of those views were live during the coverage, with the remaining 3.4 million watched the videos on demand. While the majority of viewership came from cricket stronghold markets such as India, the growth in the local Hong Kong market was also notable. A total of 146,000 views in total were from the Territory, up from just 8,000 in the Blitz's opening season. In addition, both weekend days of the tournament were sold out, which resulted in an electric atmosphere both at the ground and during the broadcast.

The tournament also made waves in the cricket world, with the Blitz becoming the first major T20 event to be run by an Associate member. Preparations have already begun for the 2018 event with dates to be confirmed following the release of the schedule of the Cricket World Cup qualifiers.

== Literature ==
- 150 Years of Cricket in Hong Kong by Peter Hall, Book Guild Ltd. (Lewes, East Sussex), ISBN 9781857763133
