= Jorich van Schalkwyk =

South African cricketer (born 2006)

Personal information
- Full name: Jorich Johann van Schalkwyk
- Born: 8 November 2006 (age 20)
- Batting: Right-handed
- Bowling: Right arm off break

Domestic team information
- Years: Team
- 2025-: Titans
- FC debut: 2 October 2025 Titans v North West

Career statistics
Competition	FC	LA
Matches	3	5
Runs scored	188	250
Batting average	31.33	50.00
100s/50s	0/1	1/0
Top score	72	142
Balls bowled	44	102
Wickets	1	1
Bowling average	56.00	104.00
5 wickets in innings	0	0
10 wickets in match	0	0
Best bowling	1/21	1/19
Catches/stumpings	0/–	0/–
- Source: , 25 February 2026

Jorich Johann van Schalkwyk (born 8 November 2006) is a South African cricketer. He is a right-handed batsman and right arm off break bowler. He plays domestically for Titans, and represents the South Africa under-19 cricket team. Playing for South Africa U19 in 2025, he became the first batter to hit a double century in youth ODI cricket.

== Early life ==
The son of a farmer who played local league cricket, van Schalkwyk was born and raised in Bela-Bela in Limpopo, and played tennis, hockey and rugby in his youth before focusing on cricket. He attended Afrikaanse Hoër Seunskool, where he scored double centuries in school cricket against Cornwall Hill College and Potchefstroom Gimnasium. He later studied for a BCom degree in Marketing at the University of Pretoria.

== Domestic career ==
At the age of 17 years-old in 2023 he began playing for Titans U19 side. He made his first class cricket debut for Titans against North West cricket team in October 2025. In February 2026, he made his first List-A cricket century, as he opened the batting for the CSA Emerging XI against Border.

== International career ==
Van Schalkwyk scored an unbeaten 164 for South Africa U19 against Bangladesh U19 in July 2025, breaking the South African national record in youth ODI cricket of 156 not out set by Jacques Rudolph in the 2000 U19 World Cup against Nepal. Three days later, van Schalkwyk became the first batter to hit a double century in Youth ODIs when he scored 215 from 153 balls against Zimbabwe U19 in Harare. He overtook the previous highest 50-over score by an U19 batter when he went past Hasitha Boyagoda's 191 for Sri Lanka against Kenya in 2018.
