= Lenert van Wyk =

South African cricketer (born 1989)

Personal information
- Full name: Lenert van Wyk
- Born: 13 July 1989 (age 37); Cape Town, South Africa
- Batting: Right-handed
- Bowling: Right arm medium-fast

Domestic team information
- Years: Team
- Boland
- Cape Cobras
- Free State
- FC debut: 24 January 2008 Boland v Border
- Last FC: 22 January 2015 Free State v Easterns
- LA debut: 27 January 2008 Boland v Border
- Last LA: 7 March 2015 Free State v Border

Career statistics
Competition	FC	LA	T20
Matches	48	27	15
Runs scored	2002	487	329
Batting average	27.05	19.48	29.90
100s/50s	5/8	0/2	0/2
Top score	170	57	87*
Balls bowled	726	296	103
Wickets	5	5	1
Bowling average	96.20	50.60	138.00
5 wickets in innings	0	0	0
10 wickets in match	0	0	0
Best bowling	1/17	1/10	1/21
Catches/stumpings	21/–	11/–	1/–
- Source: ESPNcricinfo, 6 November 2022

Lenert van Wyk (born 13 July 1989) is a South African former cricketer who played for Boland, Free State, and Cape Cobras. He is a right-handed upper-order batsman and part-time medium-fast bowler.
