= David Wiese =

Namibian cricketer (born 1985)

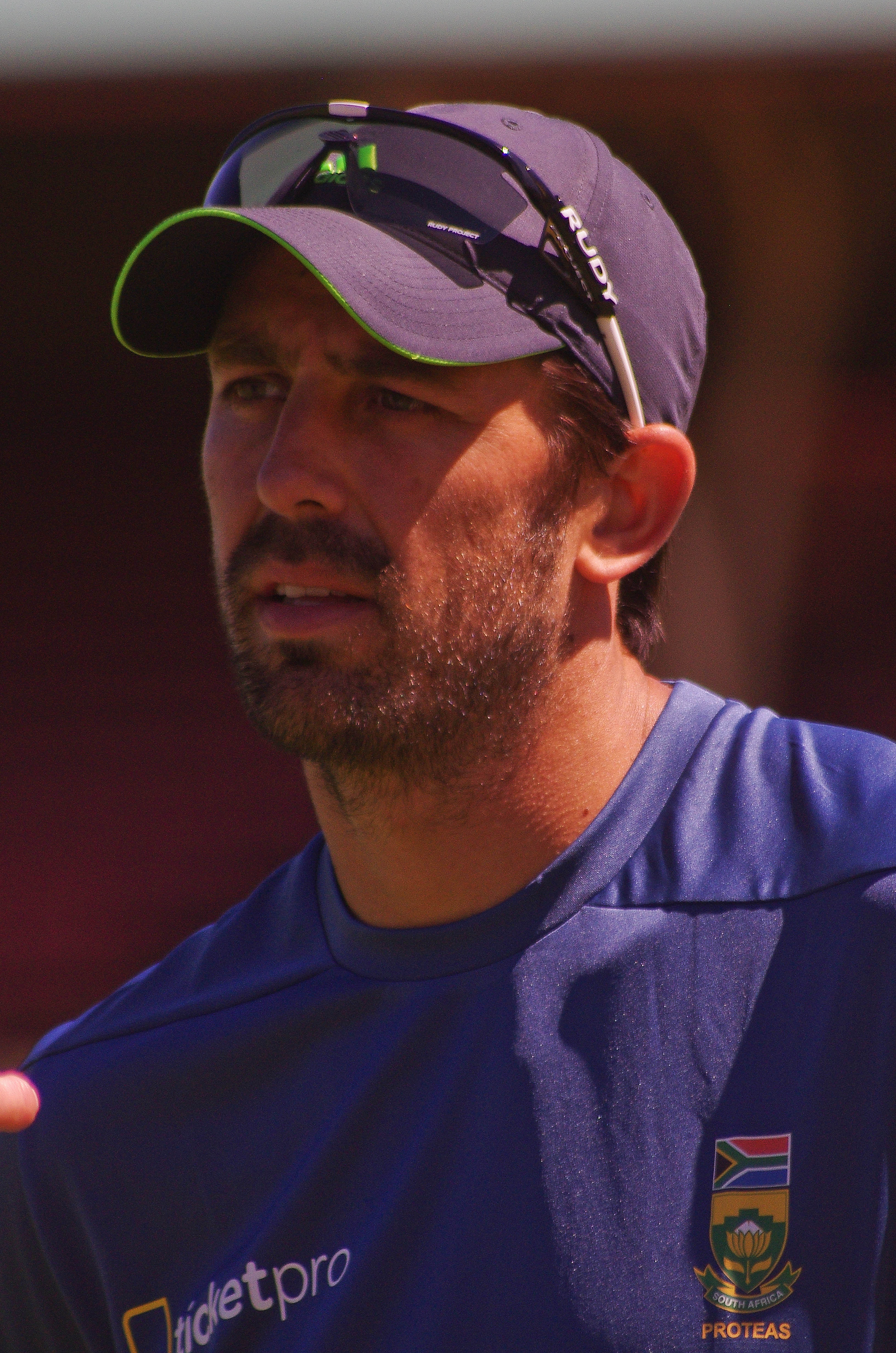

Personal information
- Full name: David Veelsydig Wiese
- Born: 18 May 1985 (age 41); Roodepoort, Transvaal Province, South Africa
- Nickname: Murshid
- Batting: Right-handed
- Bowling: Right arm medium-fast
- Role: All-rounder

International information
- National sides: South Africa (2013–2016); Namibia (2021–2024)
- ODI debut (cap 115/35): 19 August 2015; South Africa v New Zealand
- Last ODI: 16 July 2022; Namibia v Nepal
- ODI shirt no.: 96
- T20I debut (cap 59/20): 2 August 2013; South Africa v Sri Lanka
- Last T20I: 15 June 2024; Namibia v England
- T20I shirt no.: 96

Domestic team information
- Years: Team
- 2005/06–2017/18 (Note: Not every club that Wiese has played for is included in this list. It excludes sides he played for in only one season.): Easterns
- 2007/08–2017/18: Titans
- 2015–2016: Royal Challengers Bangalore
- 2016–2021: Sussex (squad no. 96)
- 2019–2025: Lahore Qalandars
- 2021–2022: St Lucia Kings
- 2022–2023: Northern Superchargers
- 2024–2025: Joburg Super Kings

Career statistics
Competition	ODI	T20I	FC	LA
Matches	15	54	124	162
Runs scored	330	624	5,814	3,939
Batting average	25.38	24.00	33.41	35.48
100s/50s	0/1	0/3	11/32	2/22
Top score	67	66*	208	171
Balls bowled	737	1,084	18,065	6,173
Wickets	15	59	344	146
Bowling average	45.73	22.01	28.01	38.13
5 wickets in innings	0	1	10	1
10 wickets in match	0	0	1	0
Best bowling	3/50	5/23	6/58	5/25
Catches/stumpings	2/–	20/–	70/–	50/–
- Source: ESPNcricinfo, 17 May 2025

David Wiese (born 18 May 1985) is a South African-born Namibian former cricketer who has played for Namibia in international cricket. Wiese became eligible to play international cricket for Namibia due to his father having been born in Namibia. Wiese played international cricket for South Africa from 2013 to 2016, before making his international debut for Namibia in October 2021.

Previously, Wiese ended his South Africa career in 2017 to play in county cricket. He has also made 67 first-class appearances since his debut in October 2005. He currently plays for Lahore Qalandars in Pakistan Super League. His form since his breakthrough into first-class cricket saw him selected to play for South Africa in the 2009 Hong Kong Cricket Sixes, where he was the leading wicket-taker, and for the South Africa Invitation XI in two matches against England. He is known for his explosive low-order batting and an ability to deliver slow balls.

== Early life ==
Wiese grew up in the eastern Mpumalanga Province. He spent his early years at Standerton, a town which is known for farming. He attended the high school in the coal mining hub of Witbank. He started playing cricket at the age of nine. His family originally hails from Namibia as his father was born in Namibia.

Wiese trained at a cricket institute owned by a South African coach Harry Shapiro. Wiese initially became fond of the art of spin bowling at the institute. However, he later pursued his interest in bowling pace as he grew older and taller with time. Although he was interested in pursuing his career in cricket, he was discouraged by his parents who urged him to focus more on studies. He was sent to University of Pretoria where he pursued his degree in internal auditing. He also occasionally played cricket for the university's third team during his first year with the University of Pretoria.

== Rising through the ranks ==
Wiese was included in the Titans squad for the 2012 Champions League Twenty20. During the semifinal of the 2012 CLT20 against Sydney Sixers, he hammered 61 runs off just 28 balls including six sixes which propelled Titans to a decent total of 163/5. His knock in the Champions League T20 semi final was widely appreciated and received social media attention despite Titans was knocked out of semi final. Following his knock, he was tipped to succeed veteran allrounder Jacques Kallis in the limited overs format and to fill in the void left by Lance Klusener. He was also subsequently included in the South African T20I squad for the tour of Sri Lanka in 2013 based on his batting prowess and also as an injury cover for Jacques Kallis.

== Domestic career ==
Wiese made an impact in his first domestic season both with the bat and ball playing for Easterns in the 2005–06 SAA Provincial Cup, scoring 526 runs at an average of 37.57 and taking 26 wickets at an average of 28.15 in nine first-class matches. He also received wide attention during the 2016–17 CSA T20 Challenge as a few reports claimed that he delivered 173.8 kph in a match against the Knights. However, it was later revealed that the error had happened due to a technical glitch.

Wiese signed up with Sussex County Cricket Club for the 2016 T20 Blast as an overseas player before becoming a mainstay with the club after signing a three-year Kolpak deal in 2017.

In August 2017, Wiese was named in Benoni Zalmi's squad for the first season of the T20 Global League. However, in October 2017, Cricket South Africa initially postponed the tournament until November 2018, with it being cancelled soon after. He was part of the Tshwane Spartans which emerged as runners-up to Paarl Rocks in the 2019 Mzansi Super League. He was signed by Lahore Qalandars as a late replacement for Carlos Brathwaite during the 2019 Pakistan Super League. He later became an integral member of the Lahore Qalandars franchise in PSL due to his power hitting abilities.

Wiese left Sussex in 2020 after featuring in four county seasons for the club as his Kolpak registration expired following Britain's exit from the European Union. In November 2020, it was confirmed that he would stay with the Sussex side as an overseas player for the 2021 T20 Blast. In December 2021, he was picked by Colombo Stars as a replacement player for Haris Sohail during the 2021 Lanka Premier League. However, after playing just one match in the tournament he pulled out of the tournament for personal reasons. In the 2023 Indian Premier League Auction, he was bought by the Kolkata Knight Riders.

== International career ==
Wiese made his T20I debut for South Africa against Sri Lanka on 2 August 2013. However, he was soon dropped from the national team and he was sent to play domestic cricket after modest returns in the three match T20I series against Sri Lanka. He made his One Day International debut for South Africa against New Zealand on 19 August 2015. He was included in the South African squad for the 2016 ICC World Twenty20 where South Africa were knocked out in the Super 10s.

On 9 January 2017, Wiese signed a Kolpak deal with Sussex which made him ineligible to represent South Africa anymore, ending his international career.

In August 2021, head coach of the Namibian cricket team Pierre de Bruyn confirmed that Wiese would be available to represent Namibia at the 2021 ICC Men's T20 World Cup. In September 2021, Wiese was named in Namibia's squad for the T20 World Cup tournament. He was also named in Namibia's T20I squad for the 2021 Summer T20 Bash, played just before the World Cup. He made his T20I debut on 5 October 2021, for Namibia against the United Arab Emirates.

He was part of the Namibian team that won their first ever match at an ICC tournament when they defeated the Netherlands by 6 wickets during the 2021 ICC Men's T20 World Cup in Abu Dhabi on 20 October 2021. Wiese scored an unbeaten 66 off 40 balls and took 1/32 in 4 overs in a man-of-the-match performance. He was a key member of the Namibian outfit which reached Super 12 stage in their historic campaign at the 2021 ICC World Twenty20 competition. He ended the tournament on a high note with an all-round display scoring 227 runs at a healthy decent batting average of 45.40 and picking up 6 wickets in 8 matches.

He was nominated for the ICC Player of the Month along with Shakib Al Hasan and Asif Ali for the month of October 2021.

In March 2022, he was named in Namibia's ODI squad for the 2022 United Arab Emirates Tri-Nation Series. He made his ODI debut on 6 March 2022, for Namibia against Oman. After previously playing six ODIs for South Africa, Wiese became the 15th cricketer to represent two international teams in ODIs.

In May 2024, he was named in Namibia's squad for the 2024 ICC Men's T20 World Cup tournament. On 15 June 2024, he announced his retirement from international cricket following Namibia's last group stage fixture against defending champions England on 15 June 2024 at the 2024 ICC Men's T20 World Cup, where he played a crucial innings of 27 runs in only 12 balls in a tricky run chase.
