= Charlie Burke =

Cricketer

Personal information
- Full name: Charles Adrian Burke
- Born: 1 July 1979 (age 47); Perth, Western Australia
- Height: 5 ft 11 in (1.80 m)
- Batting: Right-handed
- Bowling: Right-arm medium
- Role: Coach, Commentator
- Relatives: Andrew Burke (father)

International information
- National side: Hong Kong
- Source: ESPNcricinfo

Charles Burke is former head coach of the Hong Kong National Men and Women's cricket teams. He took over the post in May 2010 after completing 2 years with the International Cricket Council (ICC) where he was a development officer for the East Asia Pacific region.

It was a successful time at the helm of Hong Kong with the u19s Men and Women both making the semi-finals of the ACC tournaments, the Women won the T20 ACC tournament in Kuwait and the Men won promotion to ICC Pepsi World Cricket League Division 2 after winning the Division 3 event in January 2011.

The former WACA A grade bowling all-rounder is a Cricket Australia Level 3 coach and enjoyed success with under-age representative teams in Western Australia over the years in various roles as coach, coaching officer and bowling coach.

As of 2022, Charlie Burke is back living in Western Australia.
