= Jason Floros =

Australian cricketer (born 1990)

Personal information
- Full name: Jason Scott Floros
- Born: 24 November 1990 (age 35); Woden, Canberra, Australian Capital Territory
- Batting: Left-handed
- Bowling: Right-arm off spin
- Role: All-rounder
- Relatives: Benji Floros (brother)

Domestic team information
- Years: Team
- 2010/11–2017/18: Queensland
- 2011/12–2012/13: Sydney Thunder
- 2014/15–2017/18: Brisbane Heat

Career statistics
Competition	FC	LA	T20
Matches	15	28	27
Runs scored	524	380	225
Batting average	22.78	23.75	15.00
100s/50s	0/3	0/2	0/0
Top score	82	68*	42
Balls bowled	2,173	708	193
Wickets	26	17	3
Bowling average	44.46	34.88	93.33
5 wickets in innings	0	0	0
10 wickets in match	0	0	0
Best bowling	4/57	3/37	2/35
Catches/stumpings	16/–	16/–	6/–
- Source: ESPNCricInfo, 29 August 2020

Jason Scott Floros (born 24 November 1990) is an Australian former professional cricketer who played for Queensland and for the Brisbane Heat.

== Early career ==
Floros represented the Australian Capital Territory Under-17 and Under-19 cricket teams, and also attended the Australian Institute of Sport. He played in one Test and 12 ODIs for the Australia Under-19 cricket team in the 2008–09 and 2009–10 seasons.

== Queensland career ==
Floros moved from the ACT to Queensland for the 2009–10 season, representing the Queensland Under-19s and Under-23s in the Futures League. He made his List A debut for Queensland against Tasmania in October 2010, scoring six runs on debut batting at number 4. He made his first-class against South Australia in February 2011, scoring 28 and 41 on debut.

=== 2011–12 season ===
In July 2011, Floros signed with the Sydney Thunder for the 2011–12 Big Bash League.
