= Munir Dar (cricketer) =

Pakistani cricketer (born 1974)

Personal information
- Full name: Munir Ahmed Dar
- Born: 4 March 1974 (age 52); Gujrat, Pakistan
- Batting: Right-handed
- Bowling: Slow left-arm orthodox
- Role: All-rounder

International information
- National side: Hong Kong (2008–2014)
- ODI debut (cap 18): 24 June 2008 v Pakistan
- Last ODI: 25 June 2008 v India
- T20I debut (cap 12): 16 March 2014 v Nepal
- Last T20I: 20 March 2014 v Bangladesh

Domestic team information
- Years: Team
- 1999: Gujranwala

Career statistics
Competition	ODI	T20I
Matches	2	2
Runs scored	18	39
Batting average	9.00	19.50
100s/50s	0/0	0/0
Top score	14	36
Balls bowled	108	–
Wickets	0	–
Bowling average	–	–
5 wickets in innings	–	–
10 wickets in match	–	–
Best bowling	–	–
Catches/stumpings	0/–	1/–
- Source: CricketArchive, 21 March 2014

Munir Ahmed Dar (born 12 April 1974) also known as Moner Ahmed is a Pakistani former cricketer who has represented the Hong Kong national team internationally. He notably scored 36 runs off 27 balls as Hong Kong beat Bangladesh (a Test-playing nation) during the 2014 ICC World Twenty20.

== Career ==
Dar played two List A matches for Gujranwala in the 1999 Tissot Cup without appearing again at that level.

He moved to Hong Kong in 2000 to visit his brother and started playing in the amateur leagues there.

Qualifying through residency, he later appeared for the Hong Kong national cricket team, starting with the 2005 edition of the Hong Kong Cricket Sixes.

Dar turned out for Old DOHS Sports Club in the 2007-08 Dhaka Premier League.

Dar made his ODI debut for Hong Kong during the 2008 Asia Cup, coincidentally played in Pakistan. Though Hong Kong struggled with its form pre-tournament – losing most of its practice matches such as a 187 run defeat to WAPDA - he seemed more confident, posting 3 for 35 in 10 bowling overs and making 18 runs (off seven balls) during that game. However, Dar would have less impact during the tournament proper. Against his home nation Pakistan, he had no wickets in 8 overs bowled (for 34 runs conceded) and scored 14 runs in a 155 run defeat. He then went for 55 runs in 10 bowled overs and posted 4 runs in a 256 run thrashing by India.

Dar returned to form during the 2009 ICC World Cricket League Division Three. In the second game, against division powerhouse Afghanistan, he bowled a wicketless but economical spell of 32 runs conceded from his 10 overs before nearly rescuing Hong Kong's batting from a perilous 90 for eight with a quickfire 49 off 38 balls though they both fell short. In the fourth game, against Uganda, the spinner took 4 for 30 as he caused a middle-order collapse that put Hong Kong in command. As a batsman, he was powerless to stop a narrow single run defeat which sent their opponents to the World Cup Qualifier instead of them.

In the 2011 Hong Kong Cricket Sixes he was instrumental in helping Hong Kong reach the knockout stage, bowling well and hitting 33 from nine balls against South Africa in a 5 wicket win.

Dar was a decisive contributor in Hong Kong's run to the 2011 ACC Twenty20 Cup final, earning three man-of-the-match awards along the way. One of those came during an edgy semi-final against Oman in which his 76 not out with the bat rescued the team from a precarious position of 74–6 to win the game. Though they went on to lose the final to Afghanistan, Hong Kong still qualified for the 2012 ICC World Twenty20 Qualifier. Totalling 202 runs and 11 wickets over the tournament, the veteran was named Player of the Tournament, as his desire to win was praised by his coach Charlie Burke .

=== 2013 ICC World Twenty20 Qualifier ===
Having missed some preceding tournaments for personal reasons, Dar returned for the 2013 ICC World Twenty20 Qualifier. He took 17 wickets at 13.05 apiece throughout the tournament (second overall), including two separate 4 for 17 hauls against respectively the USA and Canada. Most importantly, he contributed 22 with the bat before taking 3 for 26 against in the 5th place playoff semi-final against Papua New Guinea, which Hong Kong won to qualify for the World Twenty20 for the first time in their history. For his contributions, Dar made Cricinfo.com 's team of the tournament selection.

On a negative note, during the same 2013 Qualifier, Dar was twice reported for chucking (illegal bowling action). Though he was cleared the first time by the Hong Kong Cricket Association, the second report meant he would have to undergo further scrutiny, this time by the ICC. Their experts concluded that all of the bowler's deliveries (stock delivery, quicker one and arm ball) exceeded the 15 degrees elbow extension tolerated. He was then banned from bowling for a year starting from January 2014.

=== 2014 World Twenty20 ===
Despite his bowling ban, Dar was selected for the 2014 World Twenty20 as a specialist batsman. Having been left out of the first group game (a dismal defeat to Nepal), Dar returned for the second against Afghanistan. He failed in his Twenty20 International debut, posting only 3 runs, with Hong Kong doing no better as they slumped to another defeat that eliminated them from tournament contention.

Nevertheless, he starred in the dead-rubber game against tournament hosts Bangladesh. Having bowled out Bangladesh for a meagre 108, Hong Kong then faltered and lost five wickets for 50, at which time Dar came out to the crease. Dar proceeded to give the initiative back to Hong Kong with a few boundaries, before colliding with Bangladesh captain Mushfiqur Rahim in the 15th over while scrambling to avoid a run-out. After a break to receive treatment, Dar soldiered on and – still chasing 26 runs off 24 balls – smashed 15 runs off a Farhad Reza over to edge closer to victory. Though he was bowled before reaching the target, his 27-ball 36 was instrumental in handing Hong Kong a historic first competitive win over a Test-playing nation. Though Dar couldn't really bask in the glory as he had to leave Bangladesh soon after to return to Hong Kong, he later revelled in the feat, proudly mentioning to a reporter that he had appeared in 732 stories in newspapers and web publications around the world.

== Playing style ==
An all-rounder, his playing style has been described as “substance-over-style” with “nothing graceful or stylish” about it. Batting with an “unorthodox front-on stance”, he privileges hard hitting over precision, at times launching “ugly swipes”. His left-arm spin is also said to “come out awkwardly” and lack deceit, with Dar preferring to dismiss the batsman rather than contain him.

== Personal ==
After moving to Hong Kong, Dar both played and worked (as a coach) for the Little Sai Wan Cricket Club until 2013 when the team's sponsor Diasqua - a diamond company - offered him a job.

Despite playing internationally for Hong Kong, Dar does not have a Hong Kong SAR passport and maintains his Pakistani citizenship. This caused a problem prior to the 2011 ICC World Cricket League Division Two played in Dubai as it meant he had to travel 4,800 kilometres to Karachi to obtain a new electronic passport (along with five other players).
