= Hong Kong Sixes =

International cricket competition

- Countries: Hong Kong
- Administrator: Hong Kong Cricket Board
- Format: 6 overs match
- First edition: 1992
- Latest edition: 2026
- Next edition: 2027
- Tournament format: Round-robin tournament and Knockout
- Number of teams: 8 (1992–2017); 12 (2024–present)
- Current champion: Afghanistan (1st title)
- Most successful: Pakistan (6 titles)
- Website: Official website

The Hong Kong Sixes is an international six-a-side cricket tournament held annually in Hong Kong. Organised by Cricket Hong Kong, China and sanctioned by International Cricket Council, it features short-format matches designed to promote fast-paced, high-scoring entertainment for spectators and television audiences.

Each match consists of six overs per side, with one bowler can bowl 2 overs and remaining overs to be shared by four other bowlers one each. The format therefore favors all-rounders and encourages attacking play.

All editions of the tournament have been held at the Kowloon Cricket Club, except for the 1996 and 1997 tournaments which took place at the Hong Kong Stadium, and since the 2024 edition, the matches are played at the Mission Road Ground in Kowloon.

== History ==
Pakistan is the most successful team of the tournament won 6 titles followed by England and South Africa having won 5 titles each. Sri Lanka won 2 titles and Australia, India and West Indies won one title each. In 2007, Sri Lanka defeated an All-Stars team (featuring players such as Shivnarine Chanderpaul and Shane Warne) to take the title.

The All-Stars returned for the 2008 event with West Indies batting great Brian Lara and New Zealand captain Stephen Fleming as members. They joined nine representative international teams in the tournament – defending champions Sri Lanka, Australia, Bangladesh, England, India, New Zealand, Pakistan, South Africa, and hosts Hong Kong.

The 2009 tournament, held from 31 October to 1 November, saw eight teams competing, with South Africa defeating Hong Kong in the final.

In 2011, the Hong Kong Cricket Association was awarded HK$3.5 million by the Hong Kong SAR government's Mega Event Fund (MEF) to organise the event, with added sponsorship from the KARP Group. To comply with the Mega Events Fund's objectives of promoting Hong Kong as an events capital in Asia, some changes were made to the format. These included expanding the tournament from two to three days, with tournament play starting on the Friday of the event weekend. The field was also increased from 8 to 12 teams with the addition of three more national teams and an invitational squad of international players.

The HKCA did not make another MEF application in 2012 due to time constraints, preferring instead to rely on a smaller grant through the government's 'M' Mark scheme. This resulted in a downscaled tournament played over two days on 27–28 October with eight teams (excluding the All-Stars side).

In 2013, the Hong Kong Cricket Association's applications for MEF contributions (at first HK$10 million then revised to HK$5 million) were turned down, leaving it with a budget of HK$1 million from the M-Mark scheme to organise the tournament. The association felt that a further HK$500,000 to HK$1 million would be needed to organise the tournament and cancelled it after not securing private sponsorship.

On 28 June 2017, Cricket Hong Kong announced that the Hong Kong Sixes would return on 28–29 October following a five-year absence. The event that year took place at the Kowloon Cricket Club.

== Match rules ==
The Laws of Cricket apply, except:

- Games are played between two teams of six players, and each game consists of a maximum of six six-ball overs bowled by each side (eight-ball overs in the Final).
- Each member of the fielding side bowls one over, with the exception of the wicket-keeper who does not bowl, with one player bowling two non-consecutive overs.
- Wides and no-balls count as the usual extra run to the batting side, plus an extra ball, but there are no free hits for no-balls.
- If five wickets fall before five overs are completed, the last remaining batsman bats on with the fifth batsman acting as a runner. He always takes strike. The innings is complete when the sixth wicket falls.
- Batsmen retire not out on reaching 50 runs, but a retired batsman can return to the crease after lower-order batsmen either retire or are out.
- A tournament points system awards two points for each match won.

== Tournament results ==
| Year | Winner | Runners-up | Leading run scorers | Leading wicket takers | Player of the tournament |
|---|---|---|---|---|---|
| 1992 | Pakistan | India | | | |
| 1993 | England | Sri Lanka | | | (England) Phillip DeFreitas |
| 1994 | England | Australia | | | |
| 1995 | South Africa | England | | | (South Africa) Jonty Rhodes |
| 1996 | West Indies | India | (Cricket West Indies) Stuart Williams (123) (South Africa) Derek Crookes (123) (India) Atul Bedade (123) | (Sri Lanka) Ruwan Kalpage (6) | (South Africa) Derek Crookes |
| 1997 | Pakistan | England | (Cricket West Indies) Floyd Reifer (133) | (England) Matthew Fleming (6) (England) Ben Hollioake (6) (Hong Kong) Mohammad Zubair (6) | (Pakistan) Zahoor Elahi |
| 2001 | Pakistan | South Africa | (United Arab Emirates) Kaif Ghaury (158) | (Sri Lanka) Upul Chandana (5) (United Arab Emirates) Ahmed Nadeem (5) | (Pakistan) Wasim Akram |
| 2002 | Pakistan | England | (Australia) Dene Hills (159) | (Pakistan) Naved-ul-Hasan (6) (England) Chris Silverwood (6) | (Australia) Dene Hills |
| 2003 | England | Pakistan | (Sri Lanka) Saman Jayantha (152) | (South Africa) Gerald Dros (7) | (Sri Lanka) Saman Jayantha |
| 2004 | England | Sri Lanka | (Kenya) Ravindu Shah (126) | (United Arab Emirates) Arshad Ali (5) (England) Darren Maddy (5) (Sri Lanka) Dilruwan Perera (5) | (Hong Kong) Hussain Butt |
| 2005 | India | West Indies | (Sri Lanka) Thilina Kandamby (125) | (England) Robert Croft (6) | (India) Reetinder Sodhi |
| 2006 | South Africa | Pakistan | (India) Robin Singh (129) | (Cricket West Indies) Sylvester Joseph (5) (South Africa) Nicky Boje (5) | (Pakistan) Imran Nazir |
| 2007 | Sri Lanka | All Stars | (New Zealand) Craig McMillan (148) | (Sri Lanka) Saman Jayantha (6) | (New Zealand) Craig McMillan |
| 2008 | England | Australia | (England) Dimitri Mascarenhas (185) | (Hong Kong) Irfan Ahmed (7) | (England) Dimitri Mascarenhas |
| 2009 | South Africa | Hong Kong | (England) Peter Trego (184) | (Pakistan) Shoaib Malik (7) | (Hong Kong) Irfan Ahmed |
| 2010 | Australia | Pakistan | (Pakistan) Ahmed Shehzad (218) | (Pakistan) Shoaib Malik (5) (Sri Lanka) Kaushalya Weeraratne (5) | (Australia) Glenn Maxwell |
| 2011 | Pakistan | England | (Pakistan) Umar Akmal (254) | (England) Rory Hamilton-Brown (6) (Pakistan) Abdul Razzaq (6) (Pakistan) Umar Akmal (6) | (Pakistan) Umar Akmal |
| 2012 | South Africa | Pakistan | (Pakistan) Umar Akmal (201) | (South Africa) Lyall Meyer (7) | (Pakistan) Umar Akmal |
| 2017 | South Africa | Pakistan | (Hong Kong) Nizakat Khan (192) | (Hong Kong) Ehsan Khan (6) (South Africa) Sarel Erwee (6) (South Africa) Corné Dry (6) | (Hong Kong) Nizakat Khan |
| 2024 | Sri Lanka | Pakistan | (Oman) Vinayak Shukla (275) | (Sri Lanka) Tharindu Rathnayake (8) | (Sri Lanka) Tharindu Rathnayake |
| 2025 | Pakistan | Kuwait | (Nepal) Sundeep Jora (176) | (Nepal) Rashid Khan (9) | (Pakistan) Abbas Afridi |
| 2026 | Afghanistan | Australia | (Australia) MA Bryant (216) (Pakistan) Abbas Afridi (216) | (Oman) Muzahir Raza (8) | (Pakistan) Abbas Afridi |

== Most successful teams ==
| Team | Final Appearances | Tournaments won | Years won | Tournaments runner-up | Years runner-up |
|---|---|---|---|---|---|
| Pakistan | 12 | 6 | 1992, 1997, 2001, 2002, 2011, 2025 | 6 | 2003, 2006, 2010, 2012, 2017, 2024 |
| England | 9 | 5 | 1993, 1994, 2003, 2004, 2008 | 4 | 1995, 1997, 2002, 2011 |
| South Africa | 6 | 5 | 1995, 2006, 2009, 2012, 2017 | 1 | 2001 |
| Sri Lanka | 4 | 2 | 2007, 2024 | 2 | 1993, 2004 |
| Australia | 4 | 1 | 2010 | 3 | 1994, 2008, 2026 |
| India | 3 | 1 | 2005 | 2 | 1992, 1996 |
| West Indies | 2 | 1 | 1996 | 1 | 2005 |
| Afghanistan | 1 | 1 | 2026 | - | - |
| All Stars | 1 | - | - | 1 | 2007 |
| Hong Kong | 1 | - | - | 1 | 2009 |
| Kuwait | 1 | - | - | 1 | 2025 |
| Total | 44 | 22 | - | 22 | - |

== See also ==
- Short form cricket
