= Muhammad Asad (disambiguation) =

Muhammad Asad (1900–1992) was a journalist, writer, and translator of the Quran.

Muhammad Asad or Mohammad Asad may also be:

- Muhammad Asad (cricketer), Pakistani cricketer, born 1998
- Mohammad Asad (cricketer), Pakistani cricketer, born 2000
