= Kinrara Academy Oval =

Cricket stadium in Puchong, Malaysia

Coordinates: 03°02′52″N 101°38′33″E

- Interactive map of Kinrara Academy Oval

Ground information
- Location: Bandar Kinrara, Puchong, Selangor, Malaysia
- Country: Malaysia
- Establishment: 2003
- Capacity: 4,000
- Tenants: Malaysia national cricket team Malaysia women's national cricket team Pakistan women's national cricket team
- Last used: 2022
- End names
- North End; South End

International information
- First men's ODI: 12 September 2006: Australia v West Indies
- Last men's ODI: 30 August 2018: Nepal v United Arab Emirates
- First men's T20I: 24 June 2019: Malaysia v Thailand
- Last men's T20I: 26 February 2020: Malaysia v Hong Kong
- First women's ODI: 18 October 2018: Pakistan v Australia
- Last women's ODI: 14 December 2019: Pakistan v England
- First women's T20I: 3 June 2018: Malaysia v India
- Last women's T20I: 25 June 2022: Malaysia v United Arab Emirates
- As of 25 June 2022; Source: Cricinfo

Kinrara Academy Oval was a cricket stadium located at Bandar Kinrara, Puchong, Selangor, near Kuala Lumpur, Malaysia. Constructed in 2003, it hosted its first recorded match in 2005 when Bhutan Under-17s played Kuwait Under-17s in the Asian Cricket Council Under-17 Cup. The stadium, which could seat 4,000 spectators, was closed on 30 June 2022.

== History ==
The ground hosted all seven matches in the 2006-07 DLF Cup featuring Australia, India and the West Indies. All of the matches played had One Day International status. Despite having a capacity of 4,000 during these matches, only a few hundred spectators turned up to watch. Major international cricket has not returned since. In 2007, the ground hosted a Youth One Day International series between England Under-19s and Sri Lanka Under-19s. Immediately following this series, Sri Lanka Under-19s played India Under-19s there. The following year, Malaysia hosted the 2008 Under-19 World Cup and the Kinrara Oval hosted ten Youth One Day International matches during it, including the final between India and South Africa Under-19s, which India won.

In September 2011, the ground held seven matches in the World Cricket League Division Seven. In October 2014, the ground hosted seven matches in the World Cricket League Division Three.

In August 2017, it hosted matches for the 2017 Southeast Asian Games in Malaysia.

In June 2019, it was a venue of 2019 Malaysia Tri-Nation Series. Malaysia and Thailand both played their first matches with T20I status during this tournament, following the decision of the ICC to grant full Twenty20 International status to all its members from 1 January 2019.

Pakistan women's national cricket team played some of their home matches at this venue during 2017–20 ICC Women's Championship.

The Hong Kong cricket team toured Malaysia in February 2020 to play a five-match T20I series, known as the Interport T20 Series. All the matches were played at this venue. The series marked the return of the 154-year-old tradition of contests known as 'Interport' matches, a term historically used to refer to matches played between various British settlements in Southeast Asia, such as Hong Kong and Malaysia (and the Malay states that preceded Malaysia). The series was originally scheduled to be played at the Mission Road Ground in Mong Kok, Hong Kong, but was cancelled in early February due to the COVID-19 pandemic in China. In January 2022, the stadium hosted the women's qualifier tournament for the 2022 Commonwealth Games.

On 30 March 2022, the Malaysian Cricket Association announced that they had been ordered to vacate the site due to arrears of more than RM1.8 million in disputed assessment fees. Stripping of the stadium began the next day, with hundreds of assets being auctioned by the land owner Perumahan Kinrara Berhad.

== List of centuries ==
=== One Day Internationals ===
==== Men's One Day Internationals ====
No.	Score	Player	Team	Balls	Inns.	Opposing team	Date	Result
1	141*	Sachin Tendulkar	India	148	1	West Indies	14 August 2006	Lost
2	109*	Michael Hussey	Australia	90	1	West Indies	18 August 2006	Lost

==== Women's One Day Internationals ====
No.	Score	Player	Team	Balls	Inns.	Opposing team	Date	Result
1	124	Meg Lanning	Australia	106	1	Pakistan	20 October 2018	Won
2	107	Tammy Beaumont	England	141	1	Pakistan	9 December 2019	Won
3	110	Danni Wyatt	England	95	1	Pakistan	9 December 2019	Won
4	100*	Nat Sciver	England	85	1	Pakistan	12 December 2019	Won

=== Twenty20 Internationals ===
==== Men's Twenty20 Internationals ====
No.	Score	Player	Team	Balls	Inns.	Opposing team	Date	Result
1	103	Patrick Matautaava	Vanuatu	52	1	Malaysia	2 October 2019	Won

== List of five wicket hauls ==
=== One Day Internationals ===
==== Men's One Day Internationals ====
No.	Bowler	Date	Team	Opposing team	Inn	Overs	Runs	Wkts	Econ	Result
1	Brett Lee	22 September 2006	Australia	India	2	8.5	38	5	4.3	Won
2	Rahmat Shah	2 May 2014	Afghanistan	United Arab Emirates	2	5.3	32	5	5.81	Won

=== Twenty20 Internationals ===
==== Men's Twenty20 Internationals ====
No.	Bowler	Date	Team	Opposing team	Inn	Overs	Runs	Wkts	Econ	Result
1	Khizar Hayat	20 February 2020	Malaysia	Hong Kong	2	2	4	5	2.0	Won

==== Women's Twenty20 Internationals ====
No.	Bowler	Date	Team	Opposing team	Inn	Overs	Runs	Wkts	Econ	Result
1	Nida Dar	6 June 2018	Pakistan	Sri Lanka	2	4	21	5	5.25	Won
