= List of first-class cricket quadruple centuries =

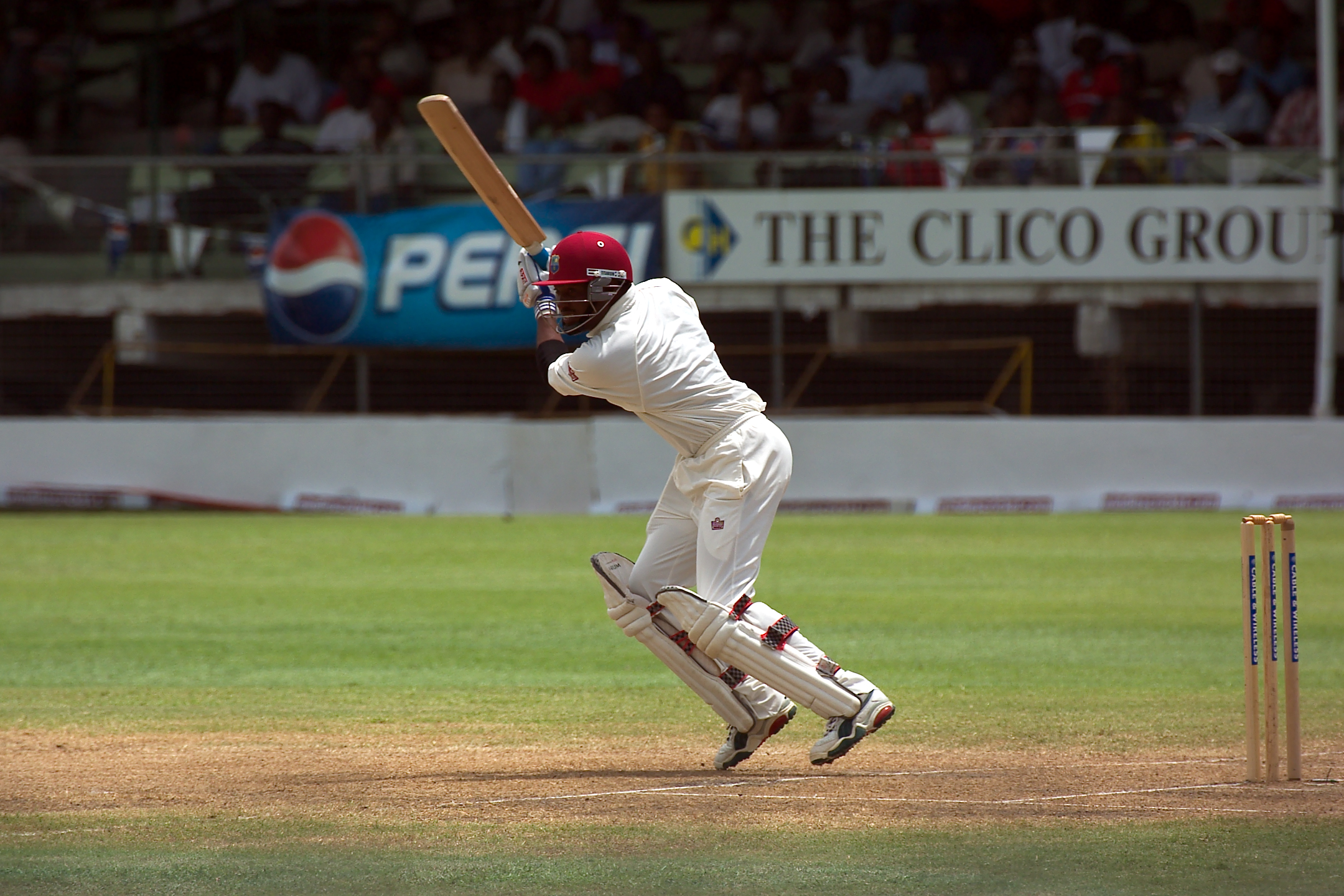
Brian Lara is one of two players to have scored 400 or more runs in first-class cricket on two occasions.

A quadruple century (an individual score of 400 runs or more) has been scored twelve times in first-class cricket by ten different players. It was first achieved in 1895 by Archie MacLaren, playing for Lancashire against Somerset, while the most recent occurrence was by Chinmay Sutar. Brian Lara is the only player to have managed the feat in Test cricket. Lara also holds the record for the highest score in first-class cricket, having made 501 not out in 1994 County Championship. Bill Ponsford is the only other player to have scored two quadruple centuries, doing so in 1923 and 1927 for the Victoria cricket team. Ponsford's scores were both made at the Melbourne Cricket Ground, making it one of two venues to have hosted two quadruple centuries, along with the Taunton County Ground. Two teams have conceded two quadruple centuries; Somerset and Queensland.

Don Bradman's score of 452 not out was made in the shortest time of all quadruple centuries; his innings lasted 415 minutes (6 hours and 55 minutes). Lara's Test quadruple was the longest, taking 778 minutes (12 hours and 58 minutes). Bradman's quadruple century was the only one to be scored in a team's second batting innings. Four quadruple centuries have been made in England, three in Australia, two in Pakistan, one in India and one in Antigua and Barbuda.

== History ==
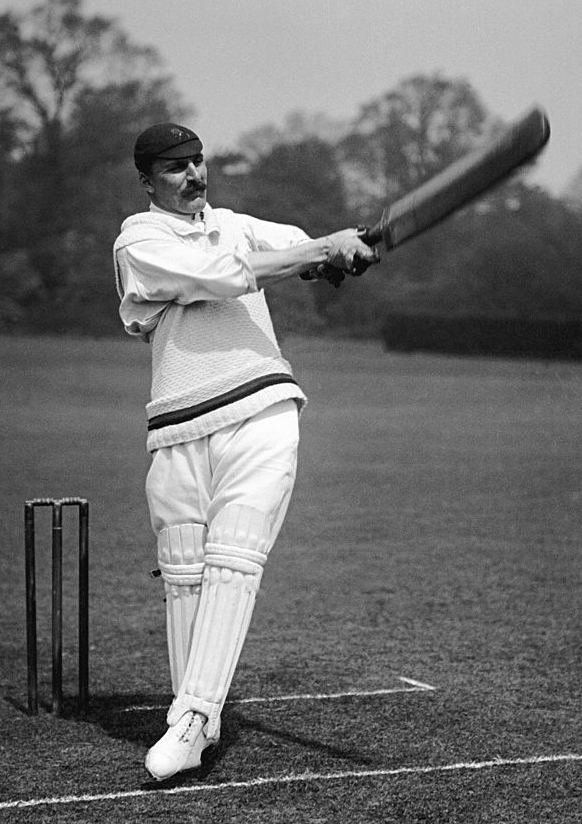
Archie MacLaren was the first player to score a quadruple century in first-class cricket, in 1895.

Prior to 1895, the highest score in first-class cricket was W. G. Grace's 344. This total was surpassed by Archie MacLaren, playing for Lancashire during a County Championship match against Somerset. MacLaren opened the batting for his side at the Taunton County Ground, and struck 1 six and 64 fours during his innings, which lasted well into the second day of the three-day match. (Note: Lancashire won the toss and batted first, scoring 801 in 222 five-ball overs. Archie MacLaren, Lancashire's captain, scored 424, and Arthur Paul made 177. Somerset replied with 143 and, following on, 206. Johnny Briggs took five for 78 and Arthur Mold five for 76 in Somerset's second innings. Lancashire won by an innings and 452 runs.) MacLaren's score of 424 remained the only quadruple century for over 25 years, until Bill Ponsford accumulated 429 runs in his third first-class match. (Note: Tasmania won the toss and batted first, scoring 217. Victoria replied with a world record 1,059 including centuries from Bill Ponsford (429) and Hammy Love (156). Tasmania then made 176 in their second innings, losing by an innings and 666 runs.) Ponsford improved on his own record four years later, reaching 437 runs; (Note: Queensland won the toss and decided to field first. Victoria scored 793, including centuries from Bill Ponsford (437) and "Stork" Hendry (129); Gordon Amos took five for 148. In reply Queensland made 189 (Don Blackie took six for 46) and, following on, 407 including 118 from Cecil Thompson; Bert Ironmonger took five for 88. Victoria won by an innings and 197 runs. Ponsford became the first man to break his own record for the highest first-class innings.) both of his quadruple centuries were scored at the Melbourne Cricket Ground. The next quadruple century was again scored in Australia, on this occasion by Don Bradman. Playing at the Sydney Cricket Ground, Bradman passed Ponsford's total, finishing on 452 not out. (Note: New South Wales won the toss and batted first, scoring 235, to which Queensland replied with 227 (Stan McCabe taking five for 36). In their second innings New South Wales amassed 761 for eight declared, with centuries from Donald Bradman (a world record 452*) and Alan Kippax (115) (Alec Hurwood took six for 179). Chasing 770 to win, Queensland were bowled out for 84 (Sam Everett took six for 23) and lost by 685 runs.) His innings, which lasted 415 minutes, is the quickest of any quadruple century.

The next three quadruple centuries were scored in the Indian subcontinent, where according to MacLaren's biographer Michael Down "standards of play are sometimes hard to assess". B. B. Nimbalkar was the first batsman to score a quadruple century without setting a new record for the highest score, hitting 443 not out for Maharashtra at Poona Club Ground. Maharashtra's opposition, Kathiawar, (Note: The Kathiawar cricket team is now known as the Saurashtra cricket team.) conceded the match on the third day without batting for a second time. (Note: Kathiawar won the toss and batted first, scoring 238. Maharashtra replied with 826 for four, with centuries from Kamal Bhandarkar (205) and Bhausaheb Nimbalkar (443 not out). This was the score at the tea interval on the third day, when the captain of Kathiawar demanded Maharashtra declare. Maharashtra refused, whereupon the Kathiawar players departed, conceding the match.) Nimbalkar so far is the only player to have scored a first-class quadruple century but completed his career without ever playing an international match. In 1959, Hanif Mohammad, who later became Pakistan's Test captain, eclipsed Bradman's record, scoring 499 runs before he was run out. (Note: In their Quaid-e-Azam Trophy semi-final, Karachi won the toss and put Bahawalpur in to bat. Bahawalpur scored 185. Karachi replied with 772 for seven declared, including centuries from Hanif Mohammad (499) and Wallis Mathias (103). Hanif was run out for the highest score in first-class cricket off the last ball of the third day of the match. In their second innings Bahawalpur scored 108, and Karachi won by an innings and 479 runs) Playing at the Karachi Parsi Institute Ground, he was trying to reach 500 runs before the end of the third day when he was run out in the final over. Fifteen years later, Aftab Baloch, also from Pakistan, became the sixth player to score a quadruple century. Captaining Sind at the Karachi National Stadium, Baloch scored 428. (Note: Baluchistan won the toss and batted first, scoring 93. Sind replied with 951 for seven declared with centuries from Bashir Shana (165), Aftab Baloch (428) and Javed Miandad (100), and dismissed Baluchistan for 283 in their second innings (Mubashir Sajjad took five for 97), winning by an innings and 575 runs.)

In 1988, Graeme Hick made the second quadruple century in England. Coming 93 years after the first, it was similarly scored at the County Ground, Taunton. In an innings which Vic Marks described as "clinical rather than charismatic", Hick reached 405 not out from 469 deliveries: his first 300 runs came from 411 balls, and the last hundred were scored off 58 more. (Note: Worcestershire won the toss and elected to bat first. Somerset reduced them to 132 for five, but Graeme Hick (405 not out) led a recovery. Somerset declared on 628 for seven as soon as Hick hit the six that brought up his 400. In reply Somerset made 222 and, following on, 192. Phil Newport took six for 50 in Somerset's second innings, and Worcestershire won by an innings and 214 runs.) England was once again the host nation for the next quadruple century—which became a quintuple century—when Brian Lara made the record high score in first-class cricket, hitting 501 not out for Warwickshire against Durham in 1994. (Note: Durham won the toss and batted first, scoring 556 for eight declared, including 204 for John Morris. In reply at the end of the second day Warwickshire were 210 for two, with Brian Lara 111* having been bowled by a no-ball on 12 and dropped by the wicket-keeper on 18. Rain prevented play on the third day and, together with injuries to two of Durham's bowlers, removed the possibility of either side playing for a win. So Lara batted on, scoring 390 runs on the final fourth day to end on 501*; when Lara reached 500, by hitting the penultimate ball of the day for four, Warwickshire declared with their total at 810 for four. The match was drawn.) In contrast to Hick's patient innings, Lara's total was one of only two quadruple centuries that were scored at faster than a run a minute. It is also, to date the only quadruple century scored by a batsman outside his home country. In a match that had been ruined as a contest by rain, Lara asked his captain not to declare their innings so he could try to surpass Hanif Mohammad's total. Aiming for 500, he started the final over of the day on 497, and reached the landmark with a four, scored from the penultimate ball of the over.

Ten years later, Lara became the only batsman to score a quadruple century in Test cricket when he scored 400 not out while captaining the West Indies against England at the Antigua Recreation Ground. (Note: West Indies won the toss and batted first, scoring 751 for five declared including hundreds from Brian Lara (400 not out) and Ridley Jacobs (107 not out). England replied with 285, including 102 not out from Andrew Flintoff. Following on, England were 422 for five when the match ran out of time and was drawn. Michael Vaughan made 140 in England's second innings.) When he passed Matthew Hayden's Test record score of 380, play was delayed as Baldwin Spencer, the Prime Minister of Antigua and Barbuda, came onto the field to offer his congratulations. Lara continued to bat until he reached 400.

In July 2022, Sam Northeast scored 410 not out for Glamorgan against Leicestershire. (Note: Leicestershire won the toss and batted first, running up 584 including 156 from Wiaan Mulder. In reply, Sam Northeast shared a triple century partnership with Colin Ingram (139) and a club record 461 unbroken with Chris Cooke (191*). Northeast, dropped on 96, reached 410 not out. At lunch on the final day, with Glamorgan on 795 for 5 (four batsman having been dismissed for single figure scores), there was speculation that they might bat on to chase further records, but Glamorgan's coach Matthew Maynard later stated that their assessment was that if they declared there was a one-in-thirty chance of bowling Leicestershire out and gaining an important victory; this they did, with only a few overs to spare. Leicestershire made 183, and Glamorgan won by an innings and 28 runs. Leicestershire's first innings 584 was the highest total in first class cricket by a team that went on to lose the match by an innings.) Northeast, aged 32, had not yet played an international match of any kind. Then in a Ranji Trophy Plate Group match in October 2026, Chinmay Sutar scored 400 not out for Mizoram against Nagaland. It was only Sutar's second first-class match, and his first first-class century. (Note: Nagaland won the toss and asked Mizoram to bat first. They ran up 581 for nine declared. Chinmay Sutar scored 400 not out, adding an unbroken 189 for the tenth wicket with Lalrempuia, who scored 14 not out. Nagaland were bowled out for 516, with hundreds from Sedezhalie Rupero (113) and Rongsen Jonathan (118 not out). The match was drawn, there was no time left to play the second innings.)

== Quadruple centuries ==
=== Key ===
	Description
*	denotes that the batsman remained not out
†	denotes that the total was the highest first-class score at the time
Innings	which innings of the match the quadruple century was scored in
Minutes	how many minutes the player batted for
Balls	how many deliveries the player faced
Date	the date on which the match started

Quadruple centuries
No.	Runs	Player	For	Against	Competition	Innings	Minutes	Balls	Venue	Date	Ref(s)
1	424 †	Archie MacLaren	Lancashire	Somerset	1895 County Championship	1st	470	Unknown	County Ground, Taunton, England	15 July 1895	
2	429 †	Bill Ponsford	(Victoria (state)) Victoria	Tasmania		2nd	477	Unknown	Melbourne Cricket Ground, Melbourne, Australia	2 February 1923	
3	437 †	Bill Ponsford	(Victoria (state)) Victoria	Queensland	1927–28 Sheffield Shield season	1st	621	Unknown	Melbourne Cricket Ground, Melbourne, Australia	16 December 1927	
4	452* †	Don Bradman	New South Wales	Queensland	1929–30 Sheffield Shield season	3rd	415	465	Sydney Cricket Ground, Sydney, Australia	3 January 1930	
5	443*	B. B. Nimbalkar	Maharashtra	Kathiawar	1948–49 Ranji Trophy	2nd	494	Unknown	Poona Club Ground, Poona, (Note: Poona has been renamed to Pune.) India	16 December 1948	
6	499 †	Hanif Mohammad	Karachi	(Bahawalpur (princely state)) Bahawalpur	1958–59 Quaid-e-Azam Trophy	2nd	635	Unknown	Karachi Parsi Institute Ground, Karachi, Pakistan	8 January 1959	
7	428	Aftab Baloch	(Sindh) Sind	Baluchistan	1973–74 Quaid-e-Azam Trophy	2nd	584	Unknown	National Stadium, Karachi, Pakistan	18 February 1974	
8	405*	Graeme Hick	Worcestershire	Somerset	1988 County Championship	1st	555	469	County Ground, Taunton, England	5 May 1988	
9	501* †	Brian Lara	Warwickshire	(Durham, England) Durham	1994 County Championship	2nd	474	427	Edgbaston, Birmingham, England	2 June 1994	
10	400*	Brian Lara	(Cricket West Indies) West Indies	England	4th Test	1st	778	582	Antigua Recreation Ground, St. John's, Antigua and Barbuda	10 April 2004	
11	410*	Sam Northeast	Glamorgan	Leicestershire	2022 County Championship, Division Two	2nd	603	450	Grace Road, Leicester, England	20 July 2022	
12	400*	Chinmay Sutar	Mizoram	Nagaland	2026 Ranji Trophy, Plate Group	1st	n/a	517	Nagaland Cricket Association Stadium, Sovima	18 October 2026	

== See also ==
- List of Test cricket triple centuries
- List of One Day International cricket double centuries
