= Mohsin Khan (Hong Kong cricketer) =

Hong Kong cricketer (born 1998)

Personal information
- Born: 3 August 1998 (age 28)
- Batting: Left-handed
- Bowling: Left-arm medium fast

International information
- National side: Hong Kong
- T20I debut (cap 35): 20 February 2020 v Malaysia
- Last T20I: 26 February 2020 v Malaysia
- Source: Cricinfo, 26 February 2020

Mohsin Khan (born 3 August 1998) is a Hong Kong cricketer. In November 2019, he was named in Hong Kong's squad for the 2019 ACC Emerging Teams Asia Cup in Bangladesh. He made his List A debut for Hong Kong, against Bangladesh, in the Emerging Teams Cup on 14 November 2019.

In February 2020, he was named in Hong Kong's Twenty20 International (T20I) squad for the 2020 Interport T20I Series against Malaysia. He made his T20I debut for Hong Kong, against Malaysia, on 20 February 2020.
