= Gopendra Bohra =

Omani cricketer

Personal information
- Full name: Gopendra Bohra
- Source: Cricinfo, 16 November 2019

Gopendra Bohra is a cricketer who played for the Oman national cricket team. In November 2019, he was named in Oman's squad for the 2019 ACC Emerging Teams Asia Cup in Bangladesh. He made his List A debut for Oman, against Afghanistan, in the Emerging Teams Cup on 16 November 2019.
