= Wajid Shah =

Hong Kong cricketer (born 1999)

Personal information
- Full name: Wajid Shah Mohammad
- Born: 20 November 1999 (age 26)
- Batting: Right-handed
- Bowling: Slow left arm Orthodox
- Source: Cricinfo, 14 November 2019

Wajid Shah (born 20 November 1999) is a Hong Kong cricketer. In November 2019, he was named in Hong Kong's squad for the 2019 ACC Emerging Teams Asia Cup in Bangladesh. He made his List A debut for Hong Kong, against Bangladesh, in the Emerging Teams Cup on 14 November 2019.
