= Bill Ponsford =

Australian cricketer (1900–1991)

Bill Ponsford MBE
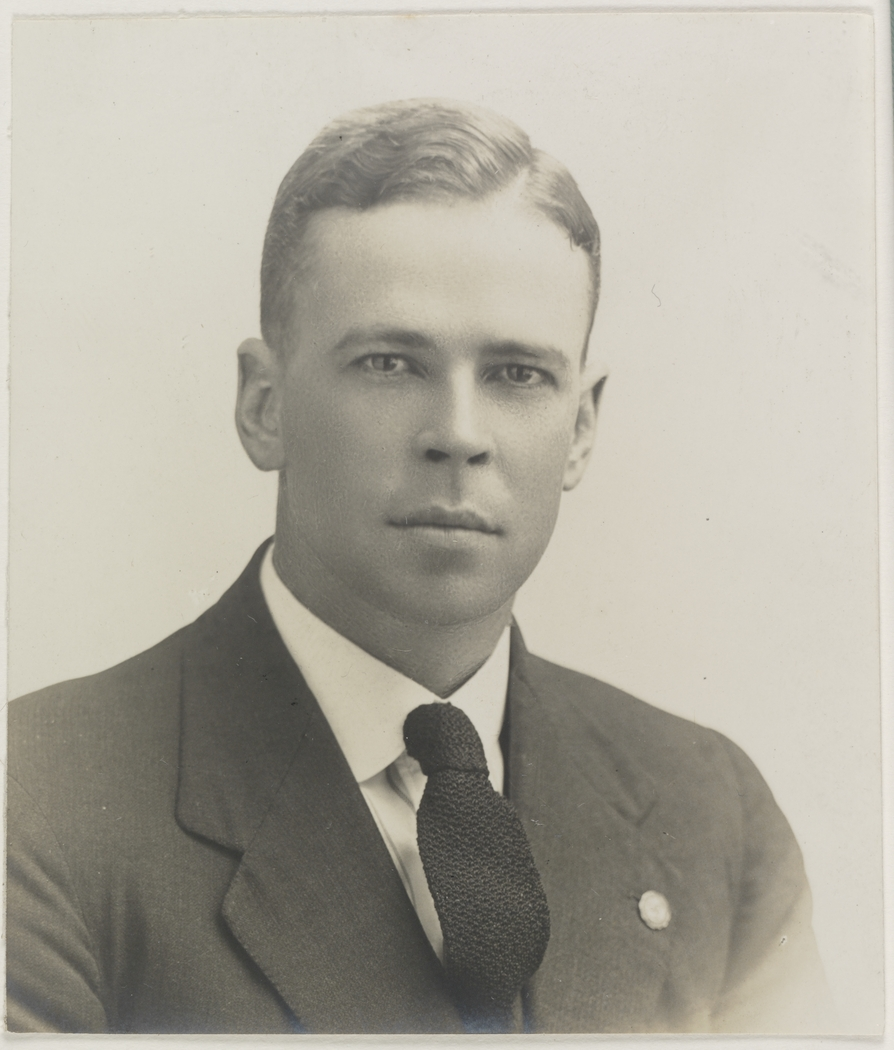
- Portrait c. 1925

Personal information
- Full name: William Harold Ponsford
- Born: 19 October 1900; Fitzroy North, Colony of Victoria
- Died: 6 April 1991 (aged 90); Kyneton, Victoria, Australia
- Nickname: Ponny, Puddin'
- Height: 5 ft 9 in (175 cm)
- Batting: Right-handed
- Bowling: Right-arm medium
- Role: Opening batsman

International information
- National side: Australia
- Test debut (cap 117): 19 December 1924 v England
- Last Test: 22 August 1934 v England

Domestic team information
- Years: Team
- 1921–1934: Victoria

Career statistics
Competition	Test	First-class
Matches	29	162
Runs scored	2,122	13,819
Batting average	48.22	65.18
100s/50s	7/6	47/43
Top score	266	437
Balls bowled	–	38
Wickets	–	0
Bowling average	–	–
5 wickets in innings	–	–
10 wickets in match	–	–
Best bowling	–	–
Catches/stumpings	21/0	71/0
- Source: CricketArchive, 29 February 2008

William Harold Ponsford MBE (19 October 1900 – 6 April 1991) was an Australian cricketer. Usually playing as an opening batsman, he formed a successful and long-lived partnership opening the batting for Victoria and Australia with Bill Woodfull, his friend and state and national captain. Ponsford is the only player to twice break the world record for the highest individual score in first-class cricket; Ponsford and Brian Lara are the only cricketers to twice score 400 runs in an innings. Ponsford holds the Australian record for a partnership in Test cricket, set in 1934 in combination with Don Bradman (451 for 2nd wicket)—the man who broke many of Ponsford's other individual records. In fact, he along with Bradman set the record for the highest partnership ever for any wicket in Test cricket history when playing on away soil (451 runs for the second wicket)

Despite being heavily built, Ponsford was quick on his feet and renowned as one of the finest ever players of spin bowling. His bat, much heavier than the norm and nicknamed "Big Bertha", allowed him to drive powerfully and he possessed a strong cut shot. However, critics questioned his ability against fast bowling, and the hostile short-pitched English bowling in the Bodyline series of 1932–33 was a contributing factor in his early retirement from cricket a year and a half later. Ponsford also represented his state and country in baseball, and credited the sport with improving his cricketing skills.

Ponsford was a shy and taciturn man. After retiring from cricket, he went to some lengths to avoid interaction with the public. He spent over three decades working for the Melbourne Cricket Club, where he had some responsibility for the operations of the Melbourne Cricket Ground (MCG), the scene of many of his great performances with the bat. In 1981 the Western Stand at the MCG was renamed the W.H. Ponsford Stand in his honour. This stand was demolished in 2003 as part of the redevelopment of the ground for the 2006 Commonwealth Games, but its replacement was also named the W.H. Ponsford Stand. At the completion of the stadium redevelopment in 2005, a statue of Ponsford was installed outside the pavilion gates. In recognition of his contributions as a player, Ponsford was one of the ten initial inductees into the Australian Cricket Hall of Fame.

== Early life ==
The son of William and Elizabeth (née Best) Ponsford, Bill Ponsford was born in the Melbourne suburb of Fitzroy North on 19 October 1900. His father was a postman whose family had emigrated from Devon, England, to Bendigo, Victoria, to work in the mines during the 1850s gold rush. His mother was also born in the goldfields, at Guildford, before moving to Melbourne with her father, a Crown Lands bailiff. Ponsford grew up on Newry St in Fitzroy North, and attended the nearby Alfred Crescent School, which stood beside the Edinburgh Gardens.

Ponsford learnt the rudiments of cricket from his uncle Cuthbert Best—a former club player for Fitzroy. He had the best batting and bowling averages for his school team in 1913, 1914 and 1915 and eventually rose to the captaincy. His local grade club, Fitzroy, awarded Ponsford a medallion—presented by the local mayor—as the most outstanding cricketer for his school during the 1913–14 and 1914–15 seasons. The medallion was awarded along with an honorary membership of the club, and Ponsford trained enthusiastically, running from school to the nearby Brunswick Street Oval in the Edinburgh Gardens to practise in the nets. Les Cody, the general secretary of Fitzroy Cricket Club and a first-class cricketer with New South Wales and Victoria, was Ponsford's first cricketing role model.

In December 1914, Ponsford completed his schooling and earned a qualifying certificate, which allowed him to continue his education at a high school should he wish. He instead chose to attend a private training college, Hassett's, to study for the Bank Clerk's exam. Ponsford passed the exam and commenced employment with the State Savings Bank at the Elizabeth Street head office in early 1916. In May 1916, the Ponsford family moved to Orrong Road in Elsternwick, a wealthier part of Melbourne. Ponsford played with Fitzroy in a minor league for the remainder of the 1915–16 season, but under the geographical "zoning" rules in place for club cricket, he was required to transfer to St Kilda Cricket Club in the following season.

== Cricket career ==
=== Early record breaking ===
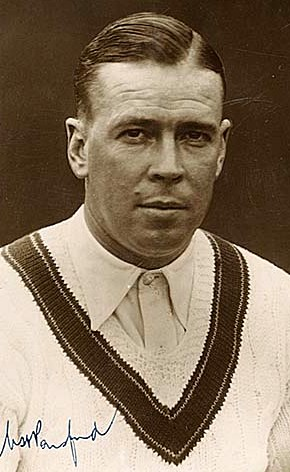
Ponsford in 1930

The First World War and the creation of the First Australian Imperial Force led to a significant shortage of players available for cricket. As a result, Ponsford was called up to make his first-grade debut for St Kilda during the 1916–17 season, just one week before his sixteenth birthday. This match was against his old club Fitzroy, and was played at the familiar Brunswick Street Oval. The young Ponsford's shot-making lacked power, and after making twelve singles, he was bowled. He played ten matches in his first season with the St Kilda First XI and averaged 9.30 runs per innings. By the 1918–19 season, Ponsford topped the club batting averages with an average of 33. He also topped the bowling averages, taking 10 wickets at an average of 16.50 runs per wicket with his leg spin.

Despite failing to score a century for his club side (something he did not rectify until the 1923–24 season), Ponsford was called up to represent Victoria against the visiting England team in February 1921—his first-class cricket debut. His selection was controversial; the leading personality in Victorian cricket and national captain, "The Big Ship" Warwick Armstrong, had been dropped. Armstrong's omission sparked a series of angry public meetings protesting against the perceived persecution of Armstrong by administrators. While making his way to the Melbourne Cricket Ground (MCG) for the match, Ponsford had to walk through demonstrators carrying placards that denounced his selection at the expense of Armstrong. Without Armstrong, the Victorians were comfortably beaten by Johnny Douglas's English team by seven wickets. Batting down the order, Ponsford made six in the first innings and 19 in the second innings. Later that month, Ponsford made his maiden first-class century, scoring 162 against Tasmania at the NTCA Ground in Launceston, despite batting low in the order, at number eight.

Ponsford was named captain of a Victorian side made of up of promising youngsters, to play against Tasmania at the MCG on 2–5 February 1923. In this, only his third first-class match, Ponsford broke the world record for the highest individual innings score at that level on the final day of the match, scoring 429 runs and batting for nearly eight hours. Along the way, he broke Armstrong's record for the highest score for Victoria (250), before surpassing former England captain Archie MacLaren's world record individual score of 424. The team score of 1,059 was also a new record for a first-class innings—an impromptu paint job was needed to show the score on a board that was not designed to display a four-figure total.

The Governor General of Australia, Lord Forster, visited the dressing rooms after the day's play to congratulate Ponsford personally. Cables from around the world applauded the new record-holder, including one from Frank Woolley, whose 305* was the previous highest score against Tasmania. The former world record holder MacLaren was not so forthcoming. MacLaren thought that the two teams were both short of first-class standard and therefore the record should not be recognised. However, an agreement made in 1908 confirmed that matches against Tasmania should be categorised as first-class matches. An exchange of letters between MacLaren and the Victorian Cricket Association, and speculation over possible political motives followed in the popular press, but the famous Wisden Cricketers' Almanack recognised and published Ponsford's score as the record.

Selected for his first Sheffield Shield match, against South Australia three weeks after his record-breaking innings, Ponsford—still batting down the order, at number five—made 108. The South Australian (and former Australian) captain Clem Hill watched Ponsford bat and commented, "[Ponsford] is young and full of promise; in fact, since Jim Mackay, the brilliant New South Welshman, I think he is the best." In 1923–24 Ponsford continued to score at a heavy rate. Against Queensland in December, he made 248 and shared in a partnership of 456 runs with Edgar Mayne—the highest first wicket partnership by an Australian pair to this day. Later that season, he scored a pair of centuries against arch-rivals New South Wales, accumulating 110 in each innings.

=== Test debut and more records ===
Ponsford broke into international cricket in the 1924–25 season. After scoring 166 for Victoria against South Australia, and 81 for an Australian XI against the touring English team, he was selected for the first Test against England at the Sydney Cricket Ground (SCG). Batting at number three, Ponsford joined his captain Herbie Collins at the wicket after the dismissal of opening batsman Warren Bardsley. Although Ponsford initially struggled against the "baffling" swing bowling of Maurice Tate, the experienced Collins was confident enough to farm the strike during Tate's initial spell and Ponsford went on to make a century (110) on his Test debut. Ponsford later said "I was most grateful for Herbie taking [Tate's bowling] until I was settled in. I doubt I would have scored a century but for his selfless approach." He scored 128 in the second Test at Melbourne; thereby becoming the first batsman to score centuries in his first two Tests. Ponsford played in all five Tests of the series, scoring 468 runs at an average of 46.80.

There were no international visitors to Australia in the 1925–26 season, so Ponsford was able to play a full season for Victoria. He scored 701 runs at an average of 63.72, including three centuries, making him the fourth highest runscorer for the season. At the end of the season, Ponsford was chosen for the Australian team to tour England in 1926. He was one of the younger players in the squad; 9 of the 15 players were over the age of 36. He made a good start to the tour, scoring a century (110*) in his first innings at Lord's against the Marylebone Cricket Club in May. Unfortunately for Ponsford, tonsillitis caused him to miss three weeks of cricket in June and he was not chosen for the first three Tests of the English summer. He returned for the fourth and fifth Tests. The fifth Test was the only match that saw a result—an English victory—which meant that the hosts won the series and the Ashes one Test to nil. For the tour, Ponsford made 901 runs at an average of 40.95, including three centuries. Wisden described Ponsford's performances for the season as "something of a disappointment" but noted that "he batted well enough on occasion to demonstrate his undoubted abilities".

In the season following his return to Australia, Ponsford continued to make large scores. He started the season by hitting 214 runs (out of a Victoria team total of 315) against South Australia at the Adelaide Oval and followed this with 151 at the MCG against Queensland. In his next match, against New South Wales, Ponsford again rewrote the record books. Ponsford scored 352 runs, 334 of them in a single day, and helped Victoria to an innings total of 1,107, which remains the highest team total in first-class cricket, breaking Victoria's own record set four years earlier. After Ponsford played the ball back on to his stumps to be dismissed bowled, he then turned to look at his broken wicket and famously said, "Cripes, I am unlucky." For the season, Ponsford went on to score 1,229 runs at an average of 122.90, including six centuries and two half-centuries from only ten innings.

In the 1927–28 season, Ponsford continued where he had left off at the end of the previous summer. Ponsford topped the aggregate and the averages for the season, scoring 1,217 runs at an average of 152.12. In December 1927, he improved on his own first-class world record score, hitting 437 against Queensland; later that month he scored 202 and 38 against New South Wales and he then added another 336 against South Australia over the New Year. He had scored 1,013 runs in the space of four innings. This feat was part of a sequence in which he scored a century in a record ten consecutive first-class matches from December 1926 to December 1927. In January 1928 the Daily News in London described Ponsford as "the most remarkable and the most heart-breaking scoring-machine ever invented". Ponsford toured New Zealand with an Australian squad in 1928. In the six first-class matches scheduled, he scored 452 at an average of 56.50, second only to his opening partner Bill Woodfull in both average and aggregate. In the 1929–30 domestic season, Ponsford scored 729 runs at an average of 45.56, including three centuries, to finish fourth in the season aggregates.

=== Struggles and success ===
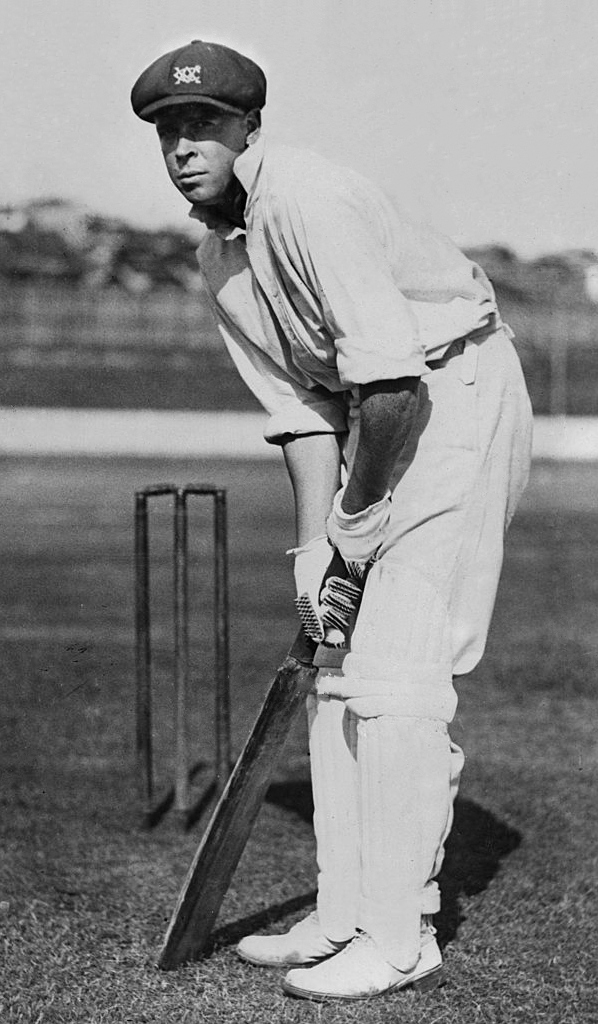
Ponsford c. 1930

A strong England team—captained by Percy Chapman and including Jack Hobbs, Herbert Sutcliffe, Wally Hammond and Harold Larwood—toured Australia in 1928–29. Ponsford's form was good in the lead up to the Tests; he scored 60 not out for Victoria against the tourists, and added 275* against South Australia. Before the Test series started, Ponsford had declared in a column in the Herald that Harold Larwood's "pace through the air is not all that fast for a fast bowler", with the qualification that "he makes great pace off the pitch". Larwood dismissed him for scores of two and six in the first Test, and fractured a bone in Ponsford's hand in the second. The injury sidelined Ponsford for the remainder of the Test series.

Ponsford travelled to England for a second time, with the 1930 Australian team. In a wet summer, Australia won the series two Tests to one, recovering The Ashes. For the second time in as many trips to England, Ponsford fell ill—gastritis caused him to miss the third Test at Headingley Cricket Ground. Despite this setback, Ponsford scored 330 runs in the Tests at an average of 55.00. Wisden wrote, "Ponsford had a much better season—especially in the Test matches—than four years previously. ... In helping his captain to wear down England's bowling he accomplished great work and, even if he was seldom really attractive to watch, there could be no question about his skill and how difficult he was to get out." The outstanding performer of the tour was the young Don Bradman, who scored 974 runs in the Test matches—this remains a world record for the most runs scored in a Test series. Ponsford played a part in Bradman's success; Wisden stated that "it is only fair to say that on more than one occasion [Bradman's] task was rendered the easier by the skilful manner in which Woodfull and Ponsford, by batting of different description, had taken the sting out of the England bowling."

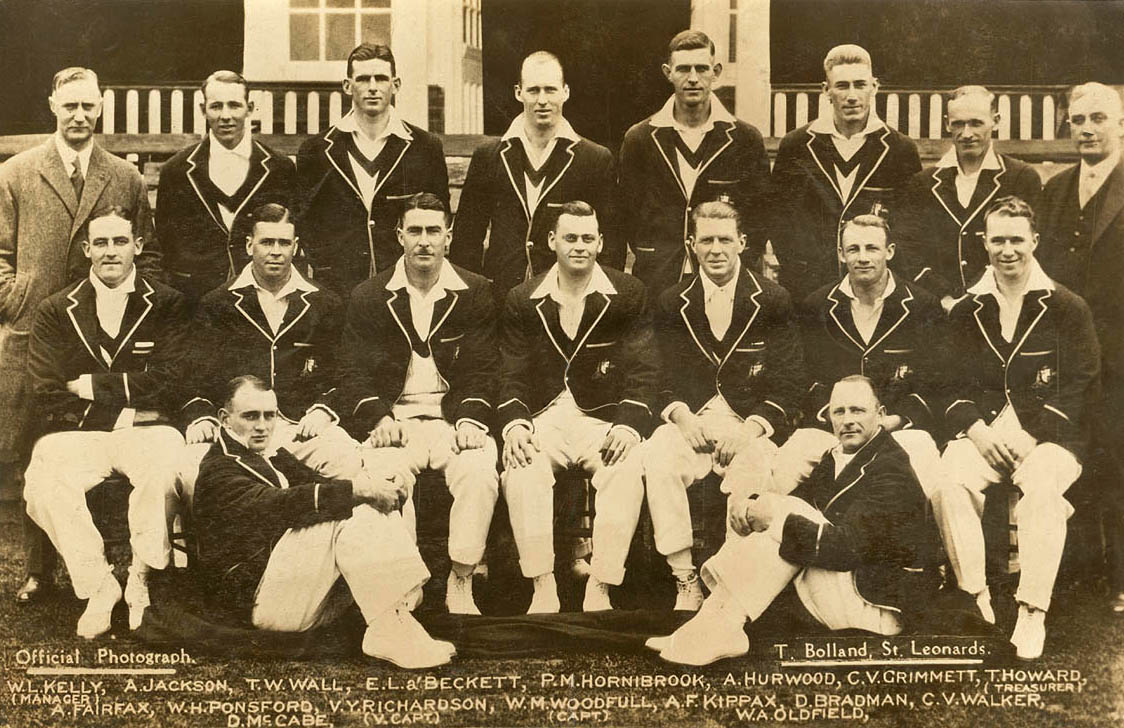
Ponsford (middle row, second from left) with the 1930 Australian team selected to tour England

In 1930–31, the West Indies sent their first-ever touring team to Australia for a five Test series. Ponsford was paired with a new partner, Archie Jackson; Woodfull chose to bat down the order to allow the young New South Welshman to open the batting. The change had little effect on Ponsford, who scored 467 runs at an average of 77.83 against the Caribbean tourists. Ponsford and Jackson started the Test series well, their 172 run partnership in the second innings taking Australia to a 10-wicket victory in the first Test. Ponsford finished just short of his century, unbeaten on 92. Before walking out to bat, Jackson had said to Ponsford, "I see the skipper padded up. We won't give him a hit!" Jackson failed in the second Test at the SCG, but Ponsford went on to score his highest Test score to date, 183, before being bowled by Tommy Scott. Another century (109) in the third Test was part of a 229 run partnership with Bradman, who went on to score 223. Ponsford was reunited with Woodfull as his opening partner for the remaining Tests after Jackson, ill and struggling for form, was omitted. The West Indies had a famous victory in the fifth Test, but lost the series 4–1.

Ponsford had less success against the South Africans during their tour of Australia in 1931–32. While the Australians took a clean sweep of the Test 5–0, Ponsford's highest score in the four Tests he played was 34; he totalled 97 runs at an average of 19.40. It was Bradman who dominated with the bat for Australia, scoring four centuries and 806 runs overall.

=== Bodyline ===
In a response to the record-breaking feats of Don Bradman, the English team that toured Australia in 1932–33—led by Douglas Jardine—adopted a tactic of fast, short pitched bowling directed at the body, later known as Bodyline. While Bodyline sought to curb Bradman, it was used against all the Australian batsmen, including Ponsford. After being bowled twice behind his legs—by Larwood for 32 in the first innings and for two in the second innings by Bill Voce—in the first Test at Sydney, Ponsford was omitted from the team for the second Test at Melbourne. Ponsford returned for the third Test in Adelaide, batting down the order. The Test was controversial and highly acrimonious; several Australian batsmen—including Woodfull and Bert Oldfield—were hit on the body and head from the English fast bowling. Ponsford was hit on several occasions during his innings of 85; he chose to turn his torso and take the rising balls on his body—especially on his left shoulder blade and backside—rather than risk a catch to the leg side fielders. When Ponsford returned to the dressing room after his dismissal, his teammates were amazed by the mass of bruises that covered his back and shoulders. Ponsford remarked to Bill O'Reilly, "I wouldn't mind having a couple more if I could get a hundred."

After failing in the fourth Test, Ponsford was again dropped. The hostile barrage of short-pitched bowling had a major impact on Ponsford's technique and career. In the three Tests that Ponsford played during the Bodyline series, he estimated he was hit around fifty times. During the series Ponsford developed a habit of turning his back on the rising ball and, if hit, glowering at the affected bowler. While the manager of the England team, Pelham Warner, thought that Ponsford "met the fast-leg theory in plucky and able style", this behaviour was criticised by the British cricket writer, R. C. Robertson-Glasgow. Bradman thought that the Bodyline tactics hastened Ponsford's eventual retirement.

=== Triumph and retirement ===
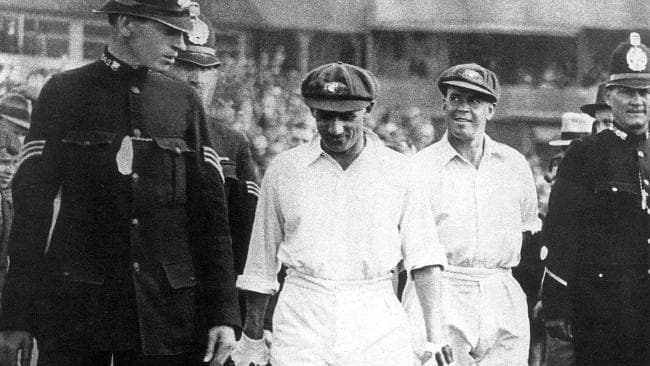
Bradman and Ponsford during the fourth Test against England in 1934

After the disappointments of the Bodyline series, Ponsford returned to domestic cricket in 1933–34, scoring 606 runs at an average of 50.50. At the end of the domestic season, he was selected for his third tour of England with the Australian team in 1934. Illness again interrupted Ponsford's English summer, causing him to miss the second Test at Lord's. In the final two Tests of the series, the two record breakers—Ponsford and Bradman—combined in two remarkable partnerships.

In the fourth Test at Headingley, Bradman joined Ponsford at the fall of the third wicket when the Australians had scored only 39 runs (39/3). By the time Ponsford was dismissed hit wicket for 181, Australia were 427/4; the partnership had yielded 388 runs. Bradman went on to make 304. The partnership was the highest ever in Test cricket at the time, and was the highest fourth wicket partnership for Australia until 2015. Wisden said of Ponsford's innings "... he hit the ball hard and placed it well when scoring in front of the wicket. Moreover, his defence was rock-like in its steadiness and accuracy."

With the series locked at 1–1, the fifth and deciding Test at The Oval saw an even larger partnership between Bradman and Ponsford. The pair added 451 runs for the second wicket in an Australian total of 701 runs. Bradman scored 244 and Ponsford—again dismissed hit wicket—his highest Test score, 266. This partnership remained the highest in Tests until 1991 and the highest for the second wicket until 1997. As of 2026, it remains the highest ever in Australian Test history. Again Wisden was complimentary, saying "It would be hard to speak in too high terms of praise of the magnificent displays of batting given by Ponsford and Bradman" but noted that "Before Bradman joined him Ponsford had shown an inclination to draw away from the bowling of Bowes."

In the four Tests that Ponsford for the English summer, he made 569 runs at an average of 94.83. His performance saw him named as one of the five Wisden Cricketers of the Year in 1935.

It is, perhaps, scarcely too much to say that English bowlers last summer thought he was every bit as difficult to get rid of as Bradman. Never a graceful or elegant batsman, Ponsford could with greater emphasis be called sound and workmanlike. He seemed in 1934 to hit the ball much harder than when he was here in 1926 and 1930, while his placing improved out of all knowledge. A delivery overpitched to any degree, he almost invariably punished to the full, while he could cut and turn the ball to leg with great certainty.

— Wisden Cricketers' Almanack,

Upon their return to Australia, a testimonial match was arranged on behalf of the two Victorian opening batsmen, Woodfull and Ponsford. Woodfull—the senior member of the partnership—had announced his retirement from first-class cricket before returning from England and the press had speculated that Ponsford would succeed him as captain of Victoria. Walking out to bat in the match, the pair were cheered by the crowd to the strains of "For He's a Jolly Good Fellow". Together, the two Bills made another century partnership, before Ponsford was dismissed for 83; Woodfull went on to make a century.

During the match, to the surprise of the public, the press and his teammates, Ponsford announced his retirement from first-class cricket at the relatively young age of 34. His announcement remarked upon the changing atmosphere in high level cricket and touched on the effects of Bodyline.

I am feeling the strain of the last tour. I am thirty four and when you get to that age you start to lose your keenness. ... Test cricket has become too serious. It is not a game anymore but a battle ... I can remember when it was all quite different to what it is now. I do not want to refer to that "bodyline" business—I am out of all that. Cricket was a different game before bodyline. Naturally I have a tinge of regret ... but it is better to go out of cricket before being dropped.

— Bill Ponsford,

Woodfull remarked that Ponsford's retirement was premature, while teammate and journalist Jack Fingleton believed that the task of maintaining such high standards had affected Ponsford's nervous energy: "At the age of 34 he felt that he never wanted to see a bat or a cricket game again." Arthur Mailey suspected that Ponsford's sensitivity to criticism, especially from the media, was a key factor behind the early retirement. The memory of being omitted from the Australian side twice during the Bodyline series also stung Ponsford sorely. Ponsford continued playing for the Melbourne Cricket Club until 1939, but never represented his state or country again.

== Off the field ==
=== Personal life ===
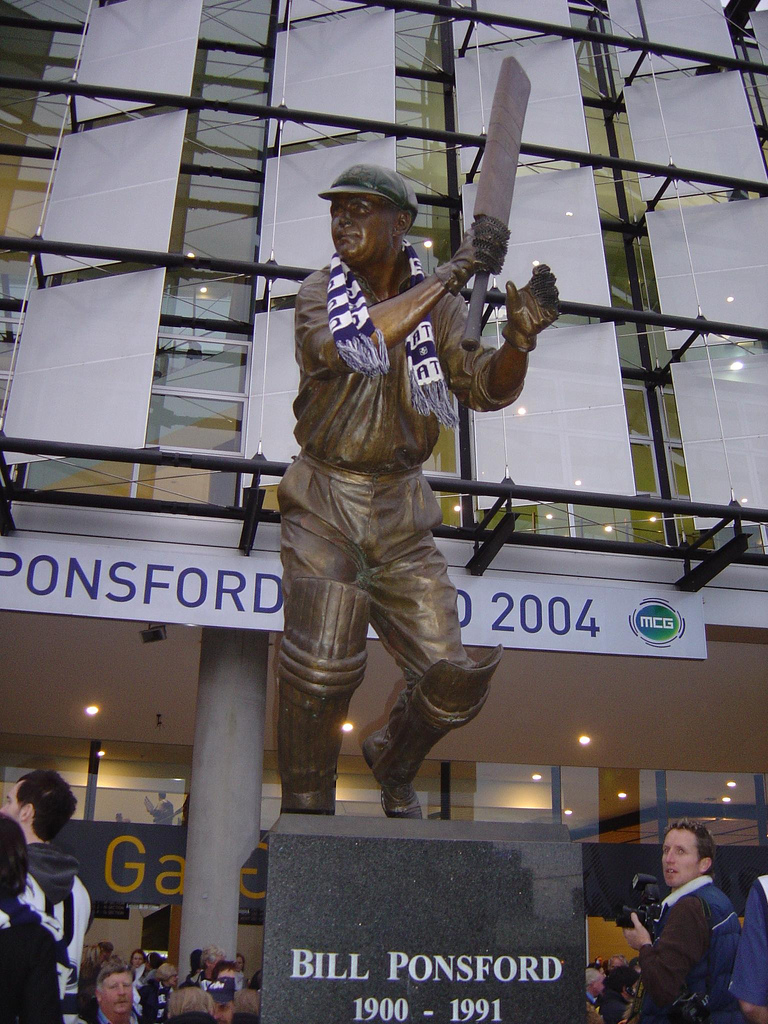
Statue of Ponsford outside the W.H. Ponsford Stand at the MCG

Ponsford began his working life at the State Savings Bank. On his return from England in 1926, the bank advised him that they might not tolerate so much leave for cricket in the future. Ponsford received a lucrative offer to play for the English Blackpool Cricket Club, which he was inclined to accept. This news was received with dismay by Australian fans, who had earlier seen players such as Ted McDonald leave Australia and accept contracts in the professional English leagues. To keep Ponsford in Melbourne, The Herald—a local newspaper—employed him on the basis that he would remain available for all representative cricket. The new role included writing articles for the paper.

In 1932, at the end of his five-year contract with the newspaper, Ponsford successfully applied for a position on the staff of the Melbourne Cricket Club. He was appointed to an unspecified office job working for the club secretary Hugh Trumble, which required him to transfer his cricket and baseball allegiances from St Kilda to Melbourne. The Herald unsuccessfully tried to retain his services, and Keith Murdoch—the Editor-in-Chief of the Herald, father of Rupert Murdoch—visited the Ponsford home to lobby against the move. Ponsford's new role included managing the staffing arrangements and crowd control at the Melbourne Cricket Ground for Australian rules football and cricket matches. In 1956, following the retirement of Vernon Ransford, Ponsford unsuccessfully applied for the position of club secretary, effectively its chief executive officer and one of the most prestigious positions in Australian cricket. However, in the event recently retired Test cricketer Ian Johnson was appointed to the position. Ponsford remained with the club until his retirement in June 1969.

Ponsford met Vera Neill at his local Methodist church; the pair married in 1924 and settled in the Melbourne suburb of Caulfield South. They had two sons, Bill Jr. and Geoff. Ponsford became a Freemason in 1922 and continued in the movement until 1985, retiring with the rank of Master Mason. During the Second World War, Ponsford attempted to volunteer with the Royal Australian Air Force, but was rejected on account of his colour blindness. In 1978, four years after the death of his wife, Ponsford moved in with his son, Geoff, at Woodend in rural Victoria, and was an active lawn bowler. An infection after an operation in 1988 saw Ponsford admitted to a nursing home in nearby Kyneton. He died there on 6 April 1991; at the time he was Australia's oldest living Test cricketer.

=== Baseball ===
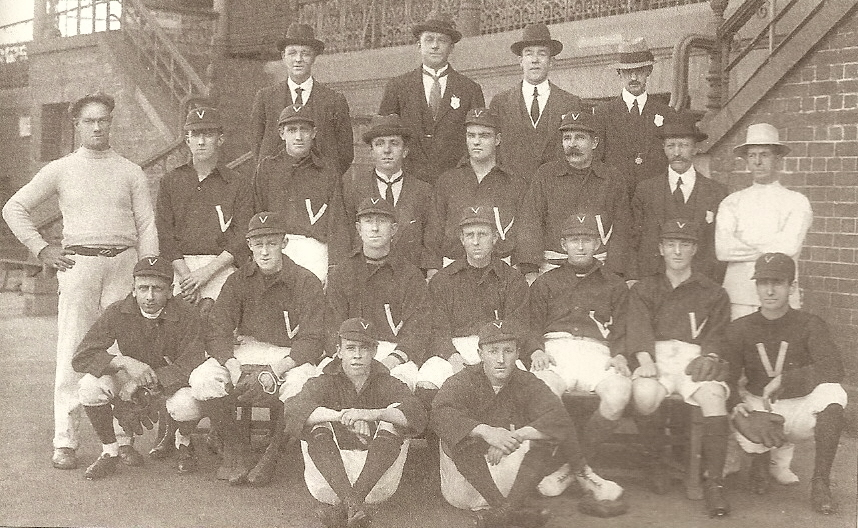
Ponsford (front row, left) wearing the Big V of the Victorian baseball team at the Melbourne Cricket Ground in 1919. His future Test cricket teammate, Jack Ryder is seated directly behind him.

Baseball was a reasonably popular sport in Australia in the early 20th century and Ponsford alternated between cricket and baseball throughout his sporting life. At the time, baseball was generally played in Australia during the winter months, as many of the leading players were enthusiastic cricketers who viewed the sport as a means of improving their fielding skills. As with cricket, Ponsford started his baseball career at Alfred Crescent School, where his coach was the former Victorian player Charles Landsdown. As a junior Ponsford played shortstop, later as a senior for the Fitzroy Baseball Club he converted to catching.

Ponsford improved rapidly and by 1913 he was included in the Victorian schoolboys side for a tournament in Adelaide. He was again selected in the following year—now as a catcher—representing his state at the first national schoolboys championship in Sydney. The tournament coincided with a visit to Australia by two professional major league teams from the United States—the Chicago White Sox and the New York Giants. The manager of the Giants, John "Mugsy" McGraw, watched part of the tournament; the Ponsford family claim that McGraw was so impressed with Ponsford's skills that he later spoke to Ponsford's parents about the possibility of Bill playing in the United States.

In 1919, Ponsford was selected for Victoria's baseball team, alongside future Test cricket teammate Jack Ryder. In 1923, The Sporting Globe claimed that Ponsford was "... the best batter of the season. ... Indeed, as an all-round man, it is doubtful if he has a superior in the state." In 1925, Ponsford captained the Victorian team and was selected as centre fielder in an Australian representative team that played three matches against an outfit from the United States Pacific Fleet, which had docked in Melbourne. Over the three matches, won by the Australians, Ponsford made five safe hits, gained eight bases and his batting average was .357. Ponsford's next match against American opposition was against a team from Stanford University that visited Australia in 1927. Ponsford's Victorian team defeated Stanford 5–3; it was the visitors' only loss on the tour.

Ponsford simultaneously retired from baseball and cricket in 1934. In his newspaper column, he said that he liked both sports equally. He felt that baseball gave a player more opportunities to perform: "In cricket you may have the bad luck to get out early; which often means a blank afternoon. It is not so with baseball; you are in the game all the time." Joe Clark, the author of History of Australian Baseball, said "Ponsford is considered by many to be the best baseballer of his time in Australia." The official program for the 1952 Claxton Shield—held in Perth—made a similar claim.

One name in Australian baseball stands pre-eminent above all others and that is the name of Bill Ponsford ... During his long career he was a star outfielder, perhaps the finest third baseman to represent his state and certainly as a catcher the equal of anybody. ... But it was as a batter that Bill outshone anyone ... Ponsford could, and did, hit to any part of a baseball field at will, and would nominate innings by innings, where he would hit the ball ... Ponsford will always remain amongst the greatest sportsmen of all time.

— 1952 Claxton Shield program,

== Context ==
=== Legacy and statistical analysis ===
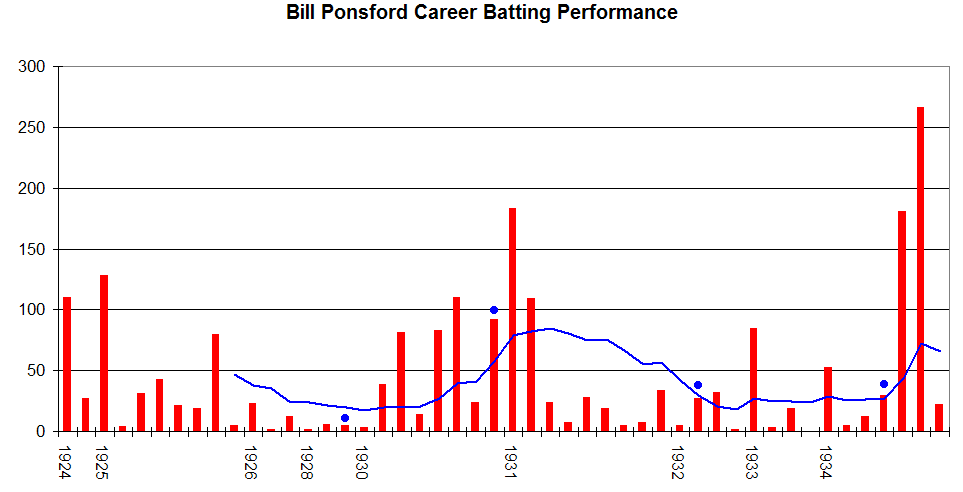
An innings-by-innings breakdown of Ponsford's Test match batting career, showing runs scored (red bars) and the average of the last 10 innings (blue line). Blue markers signify an innings that ended not out.

In first-class cricket, Ponsford scored 13,819 runs at an average of 65.18, as of 2009 the fifth highest complete career average of any player, worldwide. Ponsford was not satisfied with merely making centuries; he strove to score 200 and more. Arriving in big cricket a few years before Bradman, for a time Ponsford was considered the heaviest scorer in cricket history. Jack Fingleton claimed that "The true perspective of Ponsford's deeds had barely dawned on the game when Bradman ruthlessly thrust him from public thought ..."

Apart from Brian Lara, Ponsford is the only man to twice score 400 runs in a first-class innings and along with Bradman and Wally Hammond, he remains one of only three men to have scored four triple-centuries. His 437 against Queensland is, as at 2009, still the fifth highest score in first-class cricket.

Ponsford was known for batting in partnerships, sharing in five that amassed over 375 runs each. Ponsford and his long-time partner, Woodfull, were known as "the two Bills", "Willy Wo and Willy Po" and "Mutt and Jeff" amongst other names. Together, the pair made 23 century partnerships; 12 of these exceeded 150 runs. Ponsford's other prolific partnership was with Bradman. In two Tests in 1934, the pair set records that still stand today:

- The highest partnership for Australia in Test cricket and the highest for the second wicket: 451
- The third highest partnership for Australia in Test cricket and the highest for Australia for the fourth wicket: 388

Cricket writer Ray Robinson said of the pair batting together, "[Ponsford] was the only one who could play in Bradman's company and make it a duet."

For services to cricket, Ponsford was made a Member of the Order of the British Empire (MBE) in the 1982 New Year Honours announced on 31 December 1981. Ponsford was one of the ten inaugural inductees when the Australian Cricket Hall of Fame was launched in 1996. In 2000, Ponsford and Arthur Morris were chosen to open the batting for the Australian Cricket Board's Team of the Century, a theoretical selection of the best team of Australian cricketers of the 20th century. In 2001, Ponsford was selected in the Melbourne Cricket Club Team of the Century.

In 1986, the Western Stand of the Melbourne Cricket Ground was renamed the "W.H. Ponsford Stand". Ponsford was described by his son as being "tickled pink" by the honour, but that he would only agree to the renaming if he was not required to participate in any public appearance or media interview. As part of the ongoing modernisation of the MCG the W.H. Ponsford Stand was torn down; the new stand was completed in 2004 and again named in his honour. A statue of the cricketer was installed outside the W.H. Ponsford Stand in 1995—one of a series in place around the stadium commemorating Australia's sporting heroes.

=== Style and personality ===
Answering to the nickname of "Puddin'", Ponsford was a thickset man, weighing in at around 13 stone (83 kg) during his playing career. Despite this, he was known for his quick footwork, and was regarded as an excellent player of spin bowling. Ponsford was noted for his ability to maintain intense levels of concentration for extended periods. He possessed a strong cut shot and he drove through mid off powerfully, although critics noted that his backlift was not completely straight. He had a tendency to shuffle too far to the off; this exposed his leg stump and he was bowled behind his legs on six occasions in Tests against England. However, Ray Robinson felt that "no bowler could have got a marble, much less a [cricket] ball between his bat and his left leg."

Fingleton wrote, "He crouched a little at the crease ... he tapped the ground impatiently with his bat while awaiting the ball, and his feet were so eager to be on the move that they began an impulsive move forward just before the ball was bowled. This was the shuffle that sometimes took him across the pitch against a fast bowler; but, that aside, his footwork was perfection. I never saw a better forcer of the ball to the on-side, and for this stroke his body moved beautifully into position." However, Ponsford was not a stylish batsman. Bradman said "There were more beautiful players, but for absolute efficiency and results where can one turn to equal [Ponsford]?" Robinson described Ponsford as the "founder of total batting, the first to make a habit of regarding 100 as merely the opening battle in a campaign for a larger triumph." The New South Wales and Australian bowler Arthur Mailey later said that "I don't think it was the rungetting Ponny enjoyed so much as the bowlers' discomfort, especially when those bowlers came from New South Wales."

Ponsford used a heavy bat—2 pounds 10 ounces (1.2 kg)—nicknamed "Big Bertha". Opposition players sometimes joked that Ponsford's bat was larger than allowed under the laws of cricket and indeed in one match in Sydney, it was found to be slightly larger than permitted—the result of the bat spreading from his powerful hitting. Throughout his innings, Ponsford would pull his cap further to the left. Robinson claimed that "if you saw the peak at a rakish angle towards his left ear you could tell he was heading for his second hundred". When volunteering for service with the Royal Australian Air Force, Ponsford discovered he possessed abnormal colour vision, unable to distinguish red from green. The examining doctor was astonished and asked Ponsford, "What colour did [the ball] look to you after it was worn?" Ponsford replied, "I never noticed its colour, only its size." A later study identified Ponsford's specific colour vision as protanopia, a form of dichromacy in which red appears dark. Ponsford did not enjoy batting on rain-affected wickets. When on tour his teammates did not ask if it had rained last night, merely "Did Ponny wake during the night?"—legend had it that even the slightest trickle would wake him and have him anguishing over having to bat on the "sticky" in the morning.

Ponsford was a shy person, on the field and off. Robinson wrote that Ponsford "was so reserved that you had to know him for three years or the duration of a Test tour before his reticence relaxed." Similarly, when photographed Ponsford would hang his head so his cap would cover most of his face. This shyness intensified after his retirement. He would often walk along laneways to his work at the MCC, rather than be recognised on the way to the train station. While on the train, he would cover his face with the newspaper. At work, he disliked interaction with the public and would direct staff to advise visitors that he was not in, despite often being clearly in view. Bill O'Reilly said of Ponsford, "He spoke rarely and even then only if he could improve on silence." Nonetheless he was popular with his teammates and was said to have a droll sense of humour.

== Notes ==
References using Cricinfo and Wisden may require free registration for access.

Sporting positions
Preceded by Stork Hendry	Oldest Living Test Cricketer; 16 December 1988 – 6 April 1991	Succeeded by Bob Wyatt
Preceded by Archie MacLaren	Highest individual score in first-class cricket 429 Victoria v Tasmania at Melbourne 1922–23; 437 Victoria v Queensland at Melbourne 1927–28	Succeeded by Don Bradman
