= Dhivendran Mogan =

Malaysian cricketer (born 1996)

Personal information
- Born: 9 August 1994 (age 32)
- Batting: Right-handed
- Bowling: Right-arm medium

International information
- National side: Malaysia
- T20I debut (cap 24): 23 February 2020 v Hong Kong
- Last T20I: 22 April 2021 v Nepal
Medal record
Representing Malaysia
Men's Cricket
Southeast Asian Games
Gold medal – first place	2017 Kuala Lumpur	50 over
Silver medal – second place	2017 Kuala Lumpur	Twenty20
- Source: Cricinfo, 22 April 2021

Dhivendran Mogan (born 9 August 1994) is a Malaysian cricketer. He was in Malaysia's squad for the 2018 ICC World Cricket League Division Four tournament also in Malaysia. He played in Malaysia's opening match of the tournament, against Uganda. In August 2018, he was named in Malaysia's squad for the 2018 Asia Cup Qualifier tournament. In September 2019, he was named in Malaysia's squad for the 2019 Malaysia Cricket World Cup Challenge League A tournament. He made his List A debut against Canada, in the Cricket World Cup Challenge League A tournament on 19 September 2019.

In February 2020, he was named in Malaysia's Twenty20 International (T20I) squad for the 2020 Interport T20I Series against Hong Kong. He made his T20I debut for Malaysia, against Hong Kong, on 24 February 2020.
