= 2020 Interport T20I Series =

	Malaysia	Hong Kong
- Dates: 20 – 26 February 2020
Captains	Ahmad Faiz (Note: Virandeep Singh captained Malaysia for the fifth T20I.)	Aizaz Khan

Twenty20 International series
- Results: Malaysia won the 5-match series 5–0
Most runs	Virandeep Singh (174)	Kinchit Shah (101)
Most wickets	Syazrul Idrus (8); Khizar Hayat (8)	Aizaz Khan (8)
- Player of the series: Virandeep Singh (Mas)

The Hong Kong cricket team toured Malaysia in February 2020 to play a five-match Twenty20 International (T20I) series, known as the Interport T20 Series. All the matches were played at the Kinrara Academy Oval, Kuala Lumpur. The series marked the return of the 154-year-old tradition of contests known as 'Interport' matches, a term historically used to refer to matches played between various British settlements in Southeast Asia, such as Hong Kong and Malaysia (and the Malay states that preceded Malaysia). The series was originally scheduled to be played at the Mission Road Ground in Mong Kok, Hong Kong, but was cancelled in early February due to the coronavirus pandemic in China.

Malaysia secured victory in the series by winning the first three matches, giving them an unassailable lead. The hosts went on to sweep the series 5–0. Both teams went on to compete in the 2020 ACC Eastern Region T20 tournament (the first stage of qualification for the 2020 Asia Cup), which started a few days after the completion of the series.

== Squads ==
Malaysia	Hong Kong
Ahmad Faiz (c); Virandeep Singh (vc, wk); Mohamed Arief; Syed Aziz; Khizar Hayat; Syazrul Idrus; Dhivendran Mogan; Sharvin Muniandy; Anwar Rahman; Nazril Rahman; Aminuddin Ramly; Bhushan Save; Fitri Sham; Pavandeep Singh	Aizaz Khan (c); Kinchit Shah (vc); Haroon Arshad; Waqas Barkat; Aftab Hussain; Ehsan Khan; Hamed Khan; Mohsin Khan; Nizakat Khan; Waqas Khan; Scott McKechnie (wk); Hassan Khan Mohammad; Nasrulla Rana; Shahid Wasif

== T20I series ==
=== 1st T20I ===
20 February 2020
19:30 (D/N)
Scorecard

Malaysia; 123/3 (16.3 overs)	v	Hong Kong; 61/8 (9 overs)
Ahmad Faiz 40 (39); Kinchit Shah 1/15 (3 overs)		Shahid Wasif 26* (21); Khizar Hayat 5/4 (2 overs)

Malaysia won by 21 runs (DLS method)
Kinrara Academy Oval, Kuala Lumpur
Umpires: Viswanadan Kalidas (Mas) and Denish Sevakumaran (Mas)
Player of the match: Khizar Hayat (Mas)

- Malaysia won the toss and elected to bat.
- Malaysia's innings was ended after 16.3 overs and Hong Kong were set a revised target of 83 runs to win from 9 overs due to multiple rain delays.
- Khizar Hayat, Bhushan Save (Mas), Aftab Hussain, Hamed Khan and Mohsin Khan (HK) all made their T20I debuts.
- Khizar Hayat became the first bowler for Malaysia to take a five-wicket haul in T20Is and took a wicket with his first delivery in a T20I.

=== ,2nd T20I ===
21 February 2020
19:30 (D/N)
Scorecard

Malaysia; 138/6 (19 overs)	v	Hong Kong; 103/8 (19 overs)
Virandeep Singh 46 (40); Aizaz Khan 2/15 (4 overs)		Waqas Barkat 35 (29); Pavandeep Singh 3/18 (4 overs)

Malaysia won by 35 runs
Kinrara Academy Oval, Kuala Lumpur
Umpires: Viswanadan Kalidas (Mas) and Mathan Kumar (Mas)
Player of the match: Virandeep Singh (Mas)

- Malaysia won the toss and elected to bat.
- The match was reduced to 19 overs per side due to rain.

=== 3rd T20I ===
23 February 2020
19:30 (D/N)
Scorecard

Malaysia; 152/9 (20 overs)	v	Hong Kong; 144/7 (20 overs)
Ahmad Faiz 58 (46); Haroon Arshad 4/12 (2 overs)		Waqas Khan 60 (47); Syazrul Idrus 3/17 (4 overs)

Malaysia won by 8 runs
Kinrara Academy Oval, Kuala Lumpur
Umpires: Rudy Ismandy (Mas) and Narayanan Sivan (Mas)
Player of the match: Ahmad Faiz (Mas)

- Malaysia won the toss and elected to bat.

=== 4th T20I ===
24 February 2020
14:00
Scorecard

Malaysia; 167/7 (20 overs)	v	Hong Kong; 154/7 (20 overs)
Virandeep Singh 50 (40); Mohsin Khan 3/37 (4 overs)		Shahid Wasif 29 (25); Pavandeep Singh 2/26 (4 overs)

Malaysia won by 13 runs
Kinrara Academy Oval, Kuala Lumpur
Umpires: Viswanadan Kalidas (Mas) and Loganathan Poobalan (Mas)
Player of the match: Virandeep Singh (Mas)

- Malaysia won the toss and elected to bat.
- Dhivendran Mogan (Mas) and Hassan Khan Mohammad (HK) both made their T20I debuts.

=== 5th T20I ===
26 February 2020
10:00
Scorecard

Hong Kong; 171/7 (20 overs)	v	Malaysia; 176/4 (18.3 overs)
Kinchit Shah 72 (46); Syazrul Idrus 2/27 (4 overs)		Syed Aziz 50 (33); Aizaz Khan 2/30 (3.3 overs)

Malaysia won by 6 wickets
Kinrara Academy Oval, Kuala Lumpur
Umpires: Nasir Ali (Mas) and Viswanadan Kalidas (Mas)
Player of the match: Kinchit Shah (HK)

- Hong Kong won the toss and elected to bat.
