= Aftab Hussain =

Hong Kong cricketer (born 1997)

Personal information
- Born: 17 November 1997 (age 28); Lahore, Pakistan
- Batting: Right-handed
- Bowling: Slow left-arm orthodox

International information
- National side: Hong Kong
- T20I debut (cap 33): 20 February 2020 v Malaysia
- Last T20I: 17 July 2022 v Uganda
- Source: Cricinfo, 17 July 2022

Aftab Hussain (born 17 November 1997) is a Pakistani-born Hong Kong cricketer. In November 2019, he was named in Hong Kong's squad for the 2019 ACC Emerging Teams Asia Cup in Bangladesh. He made his List A debut for Hong Kong, against Bangladesh, in the Emerging Teams Cup on 14 November 2019. Later the same month, he was named in Hong Kong's squad for the Cricket World Cup Challenge League B tournament in Oman.

In February 2020, he was named in Hong Kong's Twenty20 International (T20I) squad for the 2020 Interport T20I Series against Malaysia. He made his T20I debut against Malaysia, on 20 February 2020.
