= 2019 ACC Emerging Teams Asia Cup =

Cricket tournament

- Dates: 14 – 23 November 2019
- Administrator: Asian Cricket Council
- Cricket format: List A
- Tournament format(s): Group and Knockout
- Host: Bangladesh
- Champions: Pakistan U23 (1st title)
- Runners-up: Bangladesh U23
- Participants: 8
- Matches: 15
- Player of the series: (Bangladesh) Soumya Sarkar
- Most runs: (Pakistan) Rohail Nazir (302)
- Most wickets: (Bangladesh) Sumon Khan (14)

The 2019 ACC Emerging Teams Asia Cup was the fourth edition of the ACC Emerging Teams Asia Cup held in Bangladesh between 14 and 23 November 2019. Eight teams participated in the tournament, including five under-23 age level teams of Test nations and the top three teams from the 2018 Asia Cup Qualifier. The tournament was organized by the Asian Cricket Council (ACC). Nepal replaced the United Arab Emirates, after they pulled out due to an unknown reason. Nepal qualified by virtue of being fourth in the Asia Cup qualifier.

The two finalists, Pakistan and Bangladesh, remained undefeated until reaching the final. Pakistan won the tournament, beating Bangladesh by 77 runs in the final.

== Teams ==
The teams were placed in the following groups:

Group A	Group B
Sri Lanka U23	India U23
Pakistan U23	Bangladesh U23
Afghanistan U23	Hong Kong (Qualifier) (1st)
Oman (Qualifier) (3rd)	Nepal (Qualifier) (4th)

== Squads ==
Afghanistan U23	Bangladesh U23	Hong Kong	India U23
Samiullah Shenwari (c); Abdul Malik; Nasir Khan; Bahir Shah; Tariq Stanikzai; Darwish Rasooli; Waheedullah Shafaq; Shahidullah; Munir Ahmad (wk); Nijat Masood; Azmatullah Omarzai; Wafadar Momand; Shawkat Zaman; Abdul Wasi; Yousuf Zazai	Nazmul Hossain Shanto (c); Mohammad Naim; Yasir Ali; Afif Hossain; Zakir Hasan; Minhajul Abedin Afridi; Aminul Islam; Soumya Sarkar; Tanvir Islam; Hasan Mahmud; Mehedi Hasan Rana; Sumon Khan; Mahidul Islam Ankon; Abu Hider; Mahedi Hasan	Aizaz Khan (c); Aarush Bhagwat; Aftab Hussain; Ahsan Abbasi; Cameron McAuslan; Ehsan Khan; Haroon Arshad; Hassan Khan Mohammad; Kinchit Shah; Mohsin Khan; Nasrulla Rana; Nizakat Khan; Raunaq Kapur; Shahid Wasif; Wajid Shah	BR Sharath (c & wk); Vinayak Gupta; Aryan Juyal; Chinmay Sutar; ~~Kamlesh Nagarkoti~~; Yash Rathod; Armaan Jaffer; Sanvir Singh; Hrithik Shokeen; Siddharth Desai; ~~Arshdeep Singh~~; Saurabh Dubey; Kumar Suraj; Parth Rekhade; Kuldip Yadav; Aditya Thakare; Shivam Mavi; Shubham Sharma
Oman	Pakistan U23	Sri Lanka U23	Nepal
Aamir Kaleem (c); Aqib Ilyas (vc); Jatinder Singh; Suraj Kumar; Sandeep Goud; Naseem Khushi; Khurram Nawaz; Mehran Khan; Mohammad Sanuth; Jay Odedra; Badal Singh; Mohammad Nadeem; Fayyaz Butt; Kaleemullah; Gopendra Bohra	Saud Shakeel (c); Rohail Nazir (vc, wk); Akif Javed; Amad Butt; Haider Ali; Hasan Mohsin; Imran Rafiq; Khushdil Shah; Mohammad Asad; Mohammad Hasnain; Mohammad Mohsin; Omair Bin Yousuf; Saif Badar; Sameen Gul; Umer Khan	Charith Asalanka (c); Kamindu Mendis (vc); Pathum Nissanka; Hasitha Boyagoda; Minod Bhanuka; Ashen Bandara; Shammu Ashan; Nishan Madushka; Jehan Daniel; Asitha Fernando; Kalana Perera; ~~Shiran Fernando~~; Ramesh Mendis; Amila Aponso; Sachindu Colombage; Chamika Karunaratne	Gyanendra Malla (c); Dipendra Singh Airee (vc); Sharad Vesawkar; Sompal Kami; Karan KC; Binod Bhandari (wk); Rohit Paudel; Lalit Rajbanshi; Pawan Sarraf; Sundeep Jora; Sushan Bhari; Ishan Pandey; Aarif Sheikh; Abinash Bohara; Kushal Bhurtel

Prior to the start of the tournament, India's Kamlesh Nagarkoti and Arshdeep Singh were ruled out of the tournament and were replaced by Aditya Thakare and Shivam Mavi respectively.

== Group stage ==
=== Group A ===
Team	Pld	W	L	T	NR	Pts	NRR
Pakistan U23	3	3	0	0	0	6	+2.066
Afghanistan U23	3	2	1	0	0	4	+0.316
Oman	3	1	2	0	0	2	−1.673
Sri Lanka U23	3	0	3	0	0	0	−0.837

Advanced to knockout stage.

14 November 2019
09:00
Scorecard

Sri Lanka U23; 268 (50 overs)	v	Oman; 269/6 (48.5 overs)
Ashen Bandara 62 (51); Mohammad Sanuth 3/41 (10 overs)		Jatinder Singh 131* (150); Amila Aponso 3/40 (10 overs)

Oman won by 4 wickets
Sheikh Kamal International Stadium, Cox's Bazar
Umpires: Tanvir Ahmed (Ban) and Mahfuzur Rahman (Ban)
Player of the match: Jatinder Singh (Oma)

- Oman won the toss and elected to field.
- Kalana Perera (Sri Lanka U23) made his List A debut.

14 November 2019
09:00
Scorecard

Afghanistan U23; 138 (42.2 overs)	v	Pakistan U23; 142/2 (35.3 overs)
Munir Ahmad 41 (71); Mohammad Mohsin 4/30 (9.2 overs)		Rohail Nazir 53* (73); Nijat Masood 1/18 (5 overs)

Pakistan U23 won by 8 wickets
Sheikh Kamal International Stadium, Cox's Bazar
Umpires: Masudur Rahman (Ban) and Chettithody Shamshuddin (Ind)
Player of the match: Mohammad Mohsin (Pakistan U23)

- Afghanistan U23 won the toss and elected to bat.
- Haider Ali and Akif Javed (Pakistan U23) both made their List A debuts.

16 November 2019
09:00
Scorecard

Pakistan U23; 183 (49.5 overs)	v	Sri Lanka U23; 93 (30.4 overs)
Amad Butt 44 (45); Asitha Fernando 3/28 (9.5 overs)		Pathum Nissanka 34 (56); Mohammad Hasnain 6/19 (7 overs)

Pakistan U23 won by 90 runs
Sheikh Kamal International Stadium, Cox's Bazar
Umpires: Masudur Rahman (Ban) and Chettithody Shamshuddin (Ind)
Player of the match: Mohammad Hasnain (Pakistan U23)

- Sri Lanka U23 won the toss and elected to field.
- Mohammad Asad (Pakistan U23) made his List A debut.

16 November 2019
09:00
Scorecard

Oman; 153 (44 overs)	v	Afghanistan U23; 154/1 (30.5 overs)
Jatinder Singh 72 (84); Tariq Stanikzai 4/29 (10 overs)		Abdul Malik 91* (102); Aqib Ilyas 1/20 (5 overs)

Afghanistan U23 won by 9 wickets
Sheikh Kamal International Stadium, Cox's Bazar
Umpires: Tanvir Ahmed (Ban) and Mahfuzur Rahman (Ban)
Player of the match: Tariq Stanikzai (Afghanistan U23)

- Afghanistan U23 won the toss and elected to field.
- Gopendra Bohra (Oma) made his List A debut.

18 November 2019
09:00
Scorecard

Sri Lanka U23; 238 (49.5 overs)	v	Afghanistan U23; 242/3 (44.5 overs)
Charith Asalanka 100 (106); Azmatullah Omarzai 3/36 (9.5 overs)		Shahidullah 102* (137); Kalana Perera 1/30 (6 overs)

Afghanistan U23 won by 7 wickets
Sheikh Kamal International Stadium, Cox's Bazar
Umpires: Masudur Rahman (Ban) and Chettithody Shamshuddin (Ind)
Player of the match: Shahidullah (Afghanistan U23)

- Afghanistan U23 won the toss and elected to field.

18 November 2019
09:00
Scorecard

Pakistan U23; 319/6 (50 overs)	v	Oman; 172 (47.2 overs)
Haider Ali 118 (131); Fayyaz Butt 2/61 (8 overs)		Mohammad Nadeem 46 (68); Khushdil Shah 3/27 (6.2 overs)

Pakistan U23 won by 147 runs
Sheikh Kamal International Stadium, Cox's Bazar
Umpires: Tanvir Ahmed (Ban) and Mahfuzur Rahman (Ban)
Player of the match: Haider Ali (Pakistan U23)

- Oman won the toss and elected to field.

=== Group B ===
Team	Pld	W	L	T	NR	Pts	NRR
Bangladesh U23	3	3	0	0	0	6	+2.502
India U23	3	2	1	0	0	4	+0.829
Nepal	3	1	2	0	0	2	−0.752
Hong Kong	3	0	3	0	0	0	−2.058

Advanced to knockout stage.

14 November 2019
09:00
Scorecard

Nepal; 193 (44.5 overs)	v	India U23; 194/3 (42 overs)
Pawan Sarraf 56 (49); Saurabh Dubey 4/26 (7.5 overs)		Sanvir Singh 56 (73); Karan KC 1/25 (7 overs)

India U23 won by 7 wickets
Bangladesh Krira Shikkha Protisthan No 3 Ground, Savar
Umpires: Ahsan Raza (Pak) and Gazi Sohel (Ban)
Player of the match: Saurabh Dubey (India U23)

- India U23 won the toss and elected to field.
- Saurabh Dubey, Armaan Jaffer, Parth Rekhade, Yash Rathod, Hrithik Shokeen, Chinmay Sutar (India U23) and Kushal Bhurtel (Nep) all made their List A debuts.

14 November 2019
09:00
Scorecard

Hong Kong; 164/9 (50 overs)	v	Bangladesh U23; 166/1 (24.1 overs)
Haroon Arshad 35 (33); Sumon Khan 4/33 (10 overs)		Soumya Sarkar 84* (74); Ehsan Khan 1/39 (8 overs)

Bangladesh U23 won by 9 wickets
Bangladesh Krira Shikkha Protisthan No 4 Ground, Savar
Umpires: Prageeth Rambukwella (SL) and Bismillah Jan Shinwari (Afg)
Player of the match: Soumya Sarkar (Bangladesh U23)

- Bangladesh U23 won the toss and elected to field.
- Haroon Arshad, Aftab Hussain, Raunaq Kapur, Mohsin Khan and Wajid Shah (HK) all made their List A debuts.

16 November 2019
09:00
Scorecard

India U23; 246 (50 overs)	v	Bangladesh U23; 250/4 (42.1 overs)
Armaan Jaffer 105 (98); Sumon Khan 4/64 (10 overs)		Nazmul Hossain Shanto 94 (88); Yash Rathod 1/16 (2 overs)

Bangladesh U23 won by 6 wickets
Bangladesh Krira Shikkha Protisthan No 3 Ground, Savar
Umpires: Prageeth Rambukwella (SL) and Ahsan Raza (Pak)
Player of the match: Nazmul Hossain Shanto (Bangladesh U23)

- Bangladesh U23 won the toss and elected to field.
- Vinayak Gupta (India U23) made his List A debut.

16 November 2019
09:00
Scorecard

Nepal; 217 (50 overs)	v	Hong Kong; 177 (45.5 overs)
Sharad Vesawkar 89 (139); Aizaz Khan 3/42 (9 overs)		Kinchit Shah 53 (80); Abinash Bohara 3/32 (9 overs); Karan KC 3/32 (9 overs)

Nepal won by 40 runs
Bangladesh Krira Shikkha Protisthan No 4 Ground, Savar
Umpires: Bismillah Jan Shinwari (Afg) and Gazi Sohel (Ban)
Player of the match: Sharad Vesawkar (Nep)

- Hong Kong won the toss and elected to field.
- Nasrulla Rana (HK) and Abinash Bohara (Nep) both made their List A debuts.

18 November 2019
09:00
Scorecard

India U23; 322/5 (50 overs)	v	Hong Kong; 202 (47.3 overs)
Chinmay Sutar 104* (85); Kinchit Shah 3/33 (10 overs)		Shahid Wasif 68 (84); Shubham Sharma 4/32 (10 overs)

India U23 won by 120 runs
Bangladesh Krira Shikkha Protisthan No 3 Ground, Savar
Umpires: Bismillah Jan Shinwari (Afg) and Gazi Sohel (Ban)
Player of the match: Chinmay Sutar (India U23)

- India U23 won the toss and elected to bat.
- Aarush Bhagwat, Hassan Khan Mohammad (HK), Kumar Suraj and Kuldip Yadav (India U23) all made their List A debuts.

18 November 2019
09:00
Scorecard

Nepal; 138 (44.3 overs)	v	Bangladesh U23; 140/2 (24 overs)
Sompal Kami 38 (63); Sumon Khan 3/29 (8.3 overs)		Nazmul Hossain Shanto 59* (56); Karan KC 1/11 (6 overs)

Bangladesh U23 won by 8 wickets
Bangladesh Krira Shikkha Protisthan No 4 Ground, Savar
Umpires: Prageeth Rambukwella (SL) and Ahsan Raza (Pak)
Player of the match: Nazmul Hossain Shanto (Bangladesh U23)

- Bangladesh U23 won the toss and elected to field.

== Knockout stage ==
=== Semi finals ===
1st Semi final
20 November 2019
09:00
Scorecard

Pakistan U23; 267/7 (50 overs)	v	India U23; 264/8 (50 overs)
Omair Yousuf 66 (97); Shivam Mavi 2/53 (10 overs)		Sanvir Singh 76 (90); Saif Badar 2/57 (10 overs)

Pakistan U23 won by 3 runs
Sher-e-Bangla National Cricket Stadium, Dhaka
Umpires: Masudur Rahman (Ban) and Bismillah Jan Shinwari (Afg)
Player of the match: Saif Badar (Pakistan U23)

- Pakistan U23 won the toss and elected to bat.

2nd Semi final
21 November 2019
09:00
Scorecard

Afghanistan U23; 228/9 (50 overs)	v	Bangladesh U23; 229/3 (39.5 overs)
Darwish Rasooli 114 (128); Hasan Mahmud 3/48 (10 overs)		Soumya Sarkar 61 (59); Abdul Wasi 2/46 (8 overs)

Bangladesh U23 won by 7 wickets
Sher-e-Bangla National Cricket Stadium, Dhaka
Umpires: Ahsan Raza (Pak) and Chettithody Shamshuddin (Ind)
Player of the match: Soumya Sarkar (Bangladesh U23)

- Bangladesh U23 won the toss and elected to field.

=== Final ===
23 November 2019
09:00
Scorecard

Pakistan U23; 301/6 (50 overs)	v	Bangladesh U23; 224 (43.3 overs)
Rohail Nazir 113 (111); Sumon Khan 3/75 (10 overs)		Afif Hossain 49 (53); Mohammad Hasnain 3/32 (8.3 overs)

Pakistan U23 won by 77 runs
Sher-e-Bangla National Cricket Stadium, Dhaka
Umpires: Prageeth Rambukwella (SL) and Chettithody Shamshuddin (Ind)
Player of the match: Rohail Nazir (Pakistan U23)

- Bangladesh U23 won the toss and elected to field.
