= Vinayak Gupta =

Indian cricketer (born 1999)

Personal information
- Born: 23 June 1999 (age 27)
- Source: Cricinfo, 16 November 2019

Vinayak Gupta (born 23 June 1999) is an Indian cricketer. In November 2019, he was named in India's squad for the 2019 ACC Emerging Teams Asia Cup in Bangladesh. He made his List A debut for India, against Bangladesh, in the Emerging Teams Cup on 16 November 2019.
