= Hamed Khan =

Hong Kong cricketer (born 1998)

Personal information
- Born: 3 October 1998 (age 28)
- Batting: Right-handed
- Bowling: Right-arm
- Role: Batsman

International information
- National side: Hong Kong
- T20I debut (cap 34): 20 February 2020 v Malaysia
- Last T20I: 24 February 2020 v Malaysia

Domestic team information
- Years: Team
- 2018-present: Pakistan Association of Hong Kong

Career statistics
Competition	T20I
Matches	3
Runs scored	15
Batting average	5.00
100s/50s	0/0
Top score	10
Catches/stumpings	1/–
- Source: ESPN Cricinfo

Hamed Khan (born 3 October 1998) is a Hong Kong international cricketer. He is a right handed batsman and right arm medium bowler. He currently plays for the Hong Kong cricket team in Twenty20 International cricket and Pakistan Association of Hong Kong team in Hong Kong Premier League T20 Tournament.

In December 2018, he was named in Hong Kong's squad for the 2018 ACC Emerging Teams Asia Cup.

In February 2021, he was selected to play in the 2020 Interport T20I Series against Malaysia. He made his Twenty 20 International debut for Hong Kong on February 20, 2020, against Malaysia. He also represented the Hong Kong under-19 cricket team before his entry to national team.
