= Khizar Hayat =

Malaysian cricketer (born 1989)

Personal information
- Full name: Khizar Hayat Durrani
- Born: 1 April 1989 (age 37); Peshawar, Khyber Pakhtunkhwa, Pakistan
- Batting: Right-handed
- Bowling: Right-arm off break
- Role: Bowler

International information
- National side: Malaysia
- T20I debut (cap 22): 20 February 2020 v Hong Kong
- Last T20I: 23 December 2022 v Bahrain
- Source: ESPNCricinfo, 25 December 2022

Khizar Hayat Durrani (Urdu: خضر حیات درانی; born 1 April 1989) is a Pakistani-born Malaysian cricketer. He was a member of the Malaysian team during the 2014 ICC World Cricket League Division Three tournament.

In February 2020, he was named in Malaysia's Twenty20 International (T20I) squad for the 2020 Interport T20I Series against Hong Kong. He made his T20I debut against Hong Kong, on 20 February 2020. In the match, he took a wicket with his first delivery, and became the first bowler for Malaysia to take a five-wicket haul in a T20I match.

He was named in Malaysia's squad for the 2022 Canada Cricket World Cup Challenge League A tournament. He made his List A debut on 28 July 2022, for Malaysia against Vanuatu.
