= Mohammad Asad (cricketer) =

Pakistani cricketer (born 2000)

Personal information
- Born: 19 March 2000 (age 26); Swabi, Pakistan
- Batting: Right-handed
- Bowling: Legbreak
- Role: Bowler
- Source: Cricinfo, 14 November 2019

Mohammad Asad, born on 19 March 2000 is a Pakistani cricketer. who has represented his country in international competitions. In November 2019, he was selected to be part of Pakistan's squad for the 2019 ACC Emerging Teams Asia Cup in Bangladesh. He made his List A debut for Pakistan, in a match against Sri Lanka, during the Emerging Teams Cup on 16 November 2019.
