= Chinmay Sutar =

Indian cricketer (born 1997)

Personal information
- Born: 3 May 1997 (age 29)
- Batting: Right-handed
- Bowling: Right-arm legbreak
- Role: Batsman

Domestic team information
- Years: Team
- 2021-2026: Mumbai
- 2026-Present: Mizoram

Career statistics
Competition	First Class	List A
Matches	2	5
Runs scored	534	134
Batting average	267.00	67.00
100s/50s	1/1	1/0
Top score	400*	104*
Balls bowled	84	–
Wickets	2	–
Bowling average	20.50	–
5 wickets in innings	–	–
10 wickets in match	–	–
Best bowling	2/34	–
Catches/stumpings	1/0	2/0
- Source: Cricinfo, 22 November 2026

Chinmay Sutar (born 3 May 1997) is an Indian cricketer. In November 2019, he was named in India's squad for the 2019 ACC Emerging Teams Asia Cup in Bangladesh. He made his List A debut for India, against Nepal, in the Emerging Teams Cup on 14 November 2019. He scored a century in just his third List A match and his second innings during the tournament, against Hong Kong. His next opportunity came in Mumbai's tour of Oman, where he could manage only 41 runs in 3 Other One Day matches and 19 in solitary Other T20 match.

He played his first List A for Mumbai 5 years later and managed to score only 2 runs. After failing to get a chance again for Mumbai in the season, he moved to Mizoram in 2026-27 season. He made his First-class debut against Manipur on October 11th, 2026 and scored a fifty in second innings. In his second First-class match, he became the second Indian ever after B. B. Nimbalkar to score a quadruple century in Ranji Trophy.
